= 2020–21 Biathlon IBU Cup =

2020–2021 season of the Biathlon IBU Cup

Discipline	Men	Women
Overall	(Norway) Filip Fjeld Andersen	(Germany) Vanessa Voigt
U25	(Norway) Filip Fjeld Andersen	(Germany) Vanessa Voigt
Individual	(Norway) Endre Strømsheim	(Germany) Vanessa Voigt
Sprint	(Norway) Filip Fjeld Andersen	(Russia) Anastasia Shevchenko
Pursuit	(Norway) Sivert Guttorm Bakken	(Germany) Vanessa Voigt (Germany) Anna Weidel
Relay	Germany	Russia
Nations Cup	Norway	Russia
- Mixed: Norway

Competition
Locations	4 venues	4 venues
Individual	15 events	15 events
Relay/Team	2 events	2 events
Mixed	6 events	6 events

The 2020–21 Biathlon IBU Cup was a multi-race tournament over a season of biathlon, organised by the International Biathlon Union. IBU Cup was the second-rank competition in biathlon after the Biathlon World Cup. The season started on 14 January 2021 in Arber, Germany and ended on 14 March 2021 in Obertilliach, Austria. The defending overall champions from the 2019–20 Biathlon IBU Cup were Lucas Fratzscher from Germany and Elisabeth Högberg from Sweden.

== Calendar ==
Below is the IBU Cup calendar for the 2020–21 season.

Location	Date	Individual / Short individual	Sprint	Pursuit	Relay	Mixed relay	Single mixed relay	Details
(Germany) Arber	14–17 January		● ●		●			
(Germany) Arber	20–23 January	●	●			●	●	
(Poland) Duszniki-Zdrój	27–31 January	●	●	●		●	●	European Championships
(Slovakia) Brezno-Osrblie	13–14 February		●	●				
(Slovakia) Brezno-Osrblie	17–21 February	●	●	●	●			
(Austria) Obertilliach	10–14 March	●	● ●			●	●	
Total: 40 (17 men's, 17 women's, 6 mixed)		4	8	3	2	3	3	

Notes

- All European Championships races included in the IBU Cup total score.
- On 11 September, the rounds originally scheduled at Idre, Sweden, Sjusjøen, Norway and Martell-Val Martello, Italy were cancelled.

== IBU Cup podiums ==
=== Men ===
Stage	Date	Place	Discipline	Winner	Second	Third	Yellow bib (After competition)	Dark blue bib (After competition)	Res.
1	14 January 2021	(Germany) Arber	10 km Sprint	(Norway) Aleksander Fjeld Andersen	(Norway) Filip Fjeld Andersen	(Norway) Sivert Guttorm Bakken	(Norway) Aleksander Fjeld Andersen	(Norway) Aleksander Fjeld Andersen	Res.
1	16 January 2021	(Germany) Arber	10 km Sprint	(Norway) Filip Fjeld Andersen	(Germany) Philipp Nawrath	(Norway) Sivert Guttorm Bakken	(Norway) Filip Fjeld Andersen	(Norway) Filip Fjeld Andersen	Res.
2	20 January 2021	(Germany) Arber	15 km Short Individual	(Norway) Endre Strømsheim	(Germany) Philipp Nawrath	(Norway) Aleksander Fjeld Andersen	(Norway) Filip Fjeld Andersen	(Norway) Filip Fjeld Andersen	Res.
2	22 January 2021	(Germany) Arber	10 km Sprint	(Norway) Filip Fjeld Andersen	(Norway) Sivert Guttorm Bakken	(Germany) Philipp Nawrath	(Norway) Filip Fjeld Andersen	(Norway) Filip Fjeld Andersen	Res.
EC	27 January 2021	(Poland) Duszniki-Zdrój	20 km Individual	(Latvia) Andrejs Rastorgujevs	(Norway) Erlend Bjøntegaard	(Norway) Endre Strømsheim	(Norway) Filip Fjeld Andersen	(Norway) Filip Fjeld Andersen	Res.
EC	29 January 2021	(Poland) Duszniki-Zdrój	10 km Sprint	(Switzerland) Martin Jäger	(Russia) Said Karimulla Khalili	(Germany) Johannes Kühn	(Norway) Filip Fjeld Andersen	(Norway) Filip Fjeld Andersen	Res.
EC	30 January 2021	(Poland) Duszniki-Zdrój	12.5 km Pursuit	(Ukraine) Artem Pryma	(Czech Republic) Michal Krčmář	(Norway) Håvard Gutubø Bogetveit	(Norway) Filip Fjeld Andersen	(Norway) Filip Fjeld Andersen	Res.
3	13 February 2021	(Slovakia) Brezno-Osrblie	10 km Sprint	(Norway) Håvard Gutubø Bogetveit	(Germany) Justus Strelow	(Norway) Erlend Bjøntegaard	(Norway) Filip Fjeld Andersen	(Norway) Filip Fjeld Andersen	Res.
3	14 February 2021	(Slovakia) Brezno-Osrblie	12.5 km Pursuit	(Germany) Philipp Nawrath	(Germany) Justus Strelow	(Norway) Sivert Guttorm Bakken	(Norway) Filip Fjeld Andersen	(Norway) Filip Fjeld Andersen	Res.
4	17 February 2021	(Slovakia) Brezno-Osrblie	15 km Short Individual	(Russia) Nikita Porshnev	(Germany) Justus Strelow	(Norway) Endre Strømsheim	(Norway) Filip Fjeld Andersen	(Norway) Filip Fjeld Andersen	Res.
4	20 February 2021	(Slovakia) Brezno-Osrblie	10 km Sprint	(Germany) Philipp Nawrath	(Germany) David Zobel	(Ukraine) Ruslan Tkalenko (Germany) Philipp Horn	(Germany) Philipp Nawrath	(Norway) Filip Fjeld Andersen	Res.
4	21 February 2021	(Slovakia) Brezno-Osrblie	12.5 km Pursuit	(Norway) Endre Strømsheim	(Norway) Sivert Guttorm Bakken	(Norway) Aleksander Fjeld Andersen	(Norway) Sivert Guttorm Bakken	(Norway) Sivert Guttorm Bakken	Res.
5	10 March 2021	(Austria) Obertilliach	15 km Short Individual	(France) Hugo Rivail	(Italy) Daniele Cappellari	(Finland) Heikki Laitinen (Germany) Justus Strelow	(Norway) Filip Fjeld Andersen	(Norway) Filip Fjeld Andersen	Res.
5	12 March 2021	(Austria) Obertilliach	10 km Sprint	(Germany) Philipp Nawrath	(Norway) Aleksander Fjeld Andersen	(France) Hugo Rivail	(Germany) Philipp Nawrath	(Norway) Filip Fjeld Andersen	Res.
5	13 March 2021	(Austria) Obertilliach	10 km Sprint	(Norway) Filip Fjeld Andersen	(Norway) Sivert Guttorm Bakken	(Norway) Aleksander Fjeld Andersen	(Norway) Filip Fjeld Andersen	(Norway) Filip Fjeld Andersen	Res.

=== Women ===
Stage	Date	Place	Discipline	Winner	Second	Third	Yellow bib (After competition)	Dark blue bib (After competition)	Res.
1	14 January 2021	(Germany) Arber	7.5 km Sprint	(Russia) Tatiana Akimova	(Russia) Valeriia Vasnetcova	(Russia) Anastasia Shevchenko	(Russia) Tatiana Akimova	(Russia) Valeriia Vasnetcova	Res.
1	16 January 2021	(Germany) Arber	7.5 km Sprint	(Russia) Tatiana Akimova	(Russia) Anastasia Shevchenko	(France) Camille Bened	(Russia) Tatiana Akimova	(Russia) Anastasia Shevchenko	Res.
2	20 January 2021	(Germany) Arber	12.5 km Short Individual	(Austria) Tamara Steiner	(Germany) Anna Weidel	(Ukraine) Ekaterina Bekh	(Russia) Tatiana Akimova	(Russia) Anastasia Shevchenko	Res.
2	22 January 2021	(Germany) Arber	7.5 km Sprint	(Russia) Valeriia Vasnetcova	(Norway) Åsne Skrede	(France) Lou Jeanmonnot	(Russia) Valeriia Vasnetcova	(Russia) Valeriia Vasnetcova	Res.
EC	27 January 2021	(Poland) Duszniki-Zdrój	15 km Individual	(Poland) Monika Hojnisz-Staręga	(Ukraine) Anastasiya Merkushyna	(Russia) Larisa Kuklina	(Russia) Anastasia Shevchenko	(Russia) Anastasia Shevchenko	Res.
EC	29 January 2021	(Poland) Duszniki-Zdrój	7.5 km Sprint	(Latvia) Baiba Bendika	(Norway) Karoline Erdal	(Russia) Anastasia Shevchenko	(Russia) Anastasia Shevchenko	(Russia) Anastasia Shevchenko	Res.
EC	30 January 2021	(Poland) Duszniki-Zdrój	10 km Pursuit	(Poland) Kamila Żuk	(Norway) Karoline Erdal	(Norway) Åsne Skrede	(Russia) Anastasia Shevchenko	(Russia) Anastasia Shevchenko	Res.
3	13 February 2021	(Slovakia) Brezno-Osrblie	7.5 km Sprint	(Germany) Vanessa Voigt	(Russia) Ekaterina Noskova	(Germany) Anna Weidel	(Russia) Anastasia Shevchenko	(Russia) Anastasia Shevchenko	Res.
3	14 February 2021	(Slovakia) Brezno-Osrblie	10 km Pursuit	(Germany) Vanessa Voigt	(Russia) Anastasiia Goreeva	(Russia) Anastasiia Egorova	(Russia) Anastasia Shevchenko	(Russia) Anastasia Shevchenko	Res.
4	17 February 2021	(Slovakia) Brezno-Osrblie	12.5 km Short Individual	(Germany) Vanessa Voigt	(Germany) Hanna Kebinger	(United States) Madeleine Phaneuf	(Germany) Vanessa Voigt	(Germany) Vanessa Voigt	Res.
4	20 February 2021	(Slovakia) Brezno-Osrblie	7.5 km Sprint	(Russia) Anastasiia Egorova	(Norway) Marthe Kråkstad Johansen	(Norway) Karoline Erdal	(Germany) Vanessa Voigt	(Germany) Vanessa Voigt	Res.
4	21 February 2021	(Slovakia) Brezno-Osrblie	10 km Pursuit	(Germany) Anna Weidel	(Ukraine) Anna Kryvonos	(Norway) Ragnhild Femsteinevik	(Germany) Vanessa Voigt	(Germany) Vanessa Voigt	Res.
5	10 March 2021	(Austria) Obertilliach	12.5 km Short Individual	(Germany) Vanessa Voigt	(Russia) Anastasiia Goreeva	(France) Sophie Chauveau	(Germany) Vanessa Voigt	(Germany) Vanessa Voigt	Res.
5	12 March 2021	(Austria) Obertilliach	7.5 km Sprint	(Norway) Emilie Kalkenberg (Russia) Anastasiia Egorova	None awarded	(Italy) Rebecca Passler	(Germany) Vanessa Voigt	(Germany) Vanessa Voigt	Res.
5	13 March 2021	(Austria) Obertilliach	7.5 km Sprint	(Russia) Anastasiia Goreeva	(Russia) Anastasiia Egorova	(France) Caroline Colombo	(Germany) Vanessa Voigt	(Germany) Vanessa Voigt	Res.

=== Men's team – 4x7.5 km Relay ===
Stage	Date	Place	Winner	Second	Third	Leader (After competition)	Res.
1	17 January 2021	(Germany) Arber	Germany Justus Strelow; Dominic Schmuck; Danilo Riethmüller; Philipp Nawrath	Ukraine Ruslan Bryhadyr; Andriy Dotsenko; Taras Lesiuk; Bogdan Tsymbal	France Oscar Lombardot; Sébastien Mahon; Éric Perrot; Hugo Rivail	Germany	Res.
4	18 February 2021	(Slovakia) Brezno-Osrblie	Germany Justus Strelow; Lucas Fratzscher; Philipp Horn; Philipp Nawrath	Russia Kirill Streltsov; Vasilii Tomshin; Nikita Porshnev; Semen Suchilov	Norway Aleksander Fjeld Andersen; Erlend Bjøntegaard; Håvard Gutubø Bogetveit; Endre Strømsheim	Germany	Res.

=== Women's team – 4x6 km Relay ===
Stage	Date	Place	Winner	Second	Third	Leader (After competition)	Res.
1	17 January 2021	(Germany) Arber	Russia Valeriia Vasnetcova; Anastasiia Goreeva; Anastasia Shevchenko; Tatiana Akimova	Sweden Ingela Andersson; Tilda Johansson; Anna Magnusson; Elisabeth Högberg	Germany Franziska Hildebrand; Stefanie Scherer; Vanessa Voigt; Marion Deigentesch	Russia	Res.
4	18 February 2021	(Slovakia) Brezno-Osrblie	Russia Natalia Gerbulova; Ekaterina Noskova; Valeriia Vasnetcova; Anastasiia Egorova	Sweden Elisabeth Högberg; Stina Nilsson; Ingela Andersson; Anna Hedström	Germany Anna Weidel; Juliane Frühwirt; Hanna Kebinger; Marion Deigentesch	Russia	Res.

=== Mixed ===
Stage	Date	Place	Discipline	Winner	Second	Third	Leader (After competition)	Res.
2	23 January 2021	(Germany) Arber	1x6 km + 1x7.5 km Single Mixed Relay	Norway Endre Strømsheim; Karoline Erdal	Italy Daniele Cappellari; Rebecca Passler	Germany Lucas Fratzscher; Stefanie Scherer	Norway	Res.
2	23 January 2021	(Germany) Arber	4x7.5 km Mixed Relay	Russia Said Karimulla Khalili; Daniil Serokhvostov; Anastasiia Goreeva; Valeriia Vasnetcova	France Oscar Lombardot; Sébastien Mahon; Sophie Chauveau; Camille Bened	Norway Aleksander Fjeld Andersen; Filip Fjeld Andersen; Åsne Skrede; Emilie Kalkenberg	Norway	Res.
EC	31 January 2021	(Poland) Duszniki-Zdrój	1x6 km + 1x7.5 km Single Mixed Relay	Germany Stefanie Scherer; Justus Strelow	France Caroline Colombo; Emilien Claude	Russia Larisa Kuklina; Evgeniy Garanichev	Germany	Res.
EC	31 January 2021	(Poland) Duszniki-Zdrój	4x6 km Mixed Relay	Norway Emilie Kalkenberg; Åsne Skrede; Erlend Bjøntegaard; Sivert Guttorm Bakken	Germany Vanessa Voigt; Marion Deigentesch; Dominic Schmuck; Philipp Nawrath	Ukraine Iryna Petrenko; Vita Semerenko; Bogdan Tsymbal; Artem Pryma	Norway	Res.
5	14 March 2021	(Austria) Obertilliach	4x6 km Mixed Relay	Germany Marion Deigentesch; Hanna Kebinger; Dominic Schmuck; Lucas Fratzscher	Norway Emilie Kalkenberg; Åsne Skrede; Filip Fjeld Andersen; Sivert Guttorm Bakken	Czech Republic Anna Tkadlecová; Tereza Voborníková; Milan Žemlička; Adam Václavík	Germany; Norway	Res.
5	14 March 2021	(Austria) Obertilliach	1x6 km + 1x7.5 km Single Mixed Relay	Norway Karoline Erdal; Aleksander Fjeld Andersen	Russia Anastasiia Egorova; Vasilii Tomshin	France Paula Botet; Sébastien Mahon	Norway	Res.

== Standings (men) ==
=== Overall ===
Pos.		Points
	(Norway) Filip Fjeld Andersen	534
2.	(Germany) Philipp Nawrath	528
3.	(Norway) Sivert Guttorm Bakken	520
4.	(Norway) Aleksander Fjeld Andersen	502
5.	(Norway) Håvard Gutubø Bogetveit	443

- Final standings after 15 races.

=== Under 25 ===
Pos.		Points
	(Norway) Filip Fjeld Andersen	534
2.	(Norway) Sivert Guttorm Bakken	520
3.	(Norway) Aleksander Fjeld Andersen	502
4.	(Germany) Justus Strelow	437
5.	(Norway) Endre Strømsheim	404

- Final standings after 15 races.

=== Nation ===
Pos.		Points
1.	Norway	6122
2.	Germany	5958
3.	Russia	5536
4.	Italy	5180
5.	Ukraine	5087

- Final standings after 20 races.

== Standings (women) ==
=== Overall ===
Pos.		Points
	(Germany) Vanessa Voigt	467
2.	(Norway) Karoline Erdal	356
3.	(Norway) Emilie Kalkenberg	353
4.	(Norway) Åsne Skrede	351
5.	(Russia) Anastasia Shevchenko	342

- Final standings after all races.

=== Under 25 ===
Pos.		Points
	(Germany) Vanessa Voigt	467
2.	(Norway) Karoline Erdal	356
3.	(Norway) Emilie Kalkenberg	353
4.	(Norway) Åsne Skrede	351
5.	(Russia) Anastasia Shevchenko	342

- Final standings after all races.

=== Nation ===
Pos.		Points
1.	Russia	6059
2.	Germany	5700
3.	Norway	5569
4.	Sweden	5528
5.	France	5221

- Final standings after 20 races.

== Medal table ==
Rank	Nation	Gold	Silver	Bronze	Total
1	Germany	12	9	8	29
2	Norway	11	11	15	37
3	Russia	10	9	5	24
4	Latvia	2	0	0	2
4	Poland	2	0	0	2
6	Ukraine	1	3	3	7
7	France	1	2	7	10
8	Austria	1	0	0	1
8	Switzerland	1	0	0	1
10	Italy	0	2	1	3
11	Sweden	0	2	0	2
12	Czech Republic	0	1	1	2
13	Finland	0	0	1	1
13	United States	0	0	1	1
Totals (14 entries)		41	39	42	122
