= 2020–21 Biathlon World Cup – Overall Men =

In the men's 2020–21 Biathlon World Cup total score, for each participating athlete the points earned in all Individual, Sprint, Pursuit and Mass start competitions held during the season are added up with the four lowest scores subtracted at the end of the season to give that athlete's final score. This includes the results from the Biathlon World Championships 2021 (held between the World Cup stages in Antholz-Anterselva and Nové Město).

== 2019–20 Top 3 standings ==
| Medal | Athlete | Points |
|---|---|---|
| Gold: | (Norway) Johannes Thingnes Bø | 913 |
| Silver: | (France) Martin Fourcade | 911 |
| Bronze: | (France) Quentin Fillon Maillet | 843 |

== Events summary ==
| Event | Winner | Second | Third |
|---|---|---|---|
| Kontiolahti 20 km Individual details | Sturla Holm Lægreid; Norway| | Johannes Thingnes Bø; Norway | Erik Lesser; Germany |
| Kontiolahti 10 km Sprint details | Johannes Thingnes Bø; Norway | Sebastian Samuelsson; Sweden | Martin Ponsiluoma; Sweden |
| Kontiolahti (2) 10 km Sprint details | Tarjei Bø; Norway | Arnd Peiffer; Germany | Johannes Thingnes Bø; Norway |
| Kontiolahti (2) 12.5 km Pursuit details | Sebastian Samuelsson; Sweden | Fabien Claude; France | Johannes Thingnes Bø; Norway |
| Hochfilzen 10 km Sprint details | Johannes Dale; Norway | Quentin Fillon Maillet; France | Fabien Claude; France |
| Hochfilzen 12.5 km Pursuit details | Quentin Fillon Maillet; France | Émilien Jacquelin; France | Johannes Dale; Norway |
| Hochfilzen (2) 10 km Sprint details | Sturla Holm Lægreid; Norway | Johannes Dale; Norway | Johannes Thingnes Bø; Norway |
| Hochfilzen (2) 12.5 km Pursuit details | Sturla Holm Lægreid; Norway| | Émilien Jacquelin; France | Johannes Thingnes Bø; Norway |
| Hochfilzen (2) 15 km Mass Start details | Arnd Peiffer; Germany | Martin Ponsiluoma; Sweden | Tarjei Bø; Norway |
| Oberhof 10 km Sprint details | Johannes Thingnes Bø; Norway | Tarjei Bø; Norway | Sturla Holm Lægreid; Norway |
| Oberhof 12.5 km Pursuit details | Sturla Holm Lægreid; Norway | Johannes Dale; Norway | Tarjei Bø; Norway |
| Oberhof (2) 10 km Sprint details | Johannes Thingnes Bø; Norway | Sturla Holm Lægreid; Norway | Arnd Peiffer; Germany |
| Oberhof (2) 15 km Mass Start details | Tarjei Bø; Norway | Felix Leitner; Austria | Benjamin Weger; Switzerland |
| Antholz-Anterselva 20 km Individual details | Alexander Loginov; Russia | Sturla Holm Lægreid; Norway | Quentin Fillon Maillet; France |
| Antholz-Anterselva 15 km Mass Start details | Johannes Thingnes Bø; Norway | Quentin Fillon Maillet; France | Jakov Fak; Slovenia |
| World Championships 10 km Sprint details | Martin Ponsiluoma; Sweden | Simon Desthieux; France | Émilien Jacquelin; France |
| World Championships 12.5 km Pursuit details | Émilien Jacquelin; France | Sebastian Samuelsson; Sweden | Johannes Thingnes Bø; Norway |
| World Championships 20 km Individual details | Sturla Holm Lægreid; Norway | Arnd Peiffer; Germany | Johannes Dale; Norway |
| World Championships 15 km Mass Start details | Sturla Holm Lægreid; Norway | Johannes Dale; Norway | Quentin Fillon Maillet; France |
| Nové Město 10 km Sprint details | Simon Desthieux; France | Sebastian Samuelsson; Sweden | Arnd Peiffer; Germany |
| Nové Město 12.5 km Pursuit details | Tarjei Bø; Norway | Johannes Thingnes Bø; Norway | Simon Desthieux; France |
| Nové Město (2) 10 km Sprint details | Quentin Fillon Maillet; France | Tarjei Bø; Norway | Lukas Hofer; Italy |
| Nové Město (2) 12.5 km Pursuit details | Quentin Fillon Maillet; France | Johannes Thingnes Bø; Norway | Émilien Jacquelin; France |
| Östersund 10 km Sprint details | Lukas Hofer; Italy | Sebastian Samuelsson; Sweden | Tarjei Bø; Norway |
| Östersund 12.5 km Pursuit details | Sturla Holm Lægreid; Norway | Johannes Thingnes Bø; Norway | Lukas Hofer; Italy |
| Östersund 15 km Mass Start details | Simon Desthieux; France | Eduard Latypov; Russia | Johannes Thingnes Bø; Norway |

== Standings ==
Point system
| Place | IN | SP | PU | MS |
|---|---|---|---|---|
| 1 | 60 | | | |
| 2 | 54 | | | |
| 3 | 48 | | | |
| 4 | 43 | | | |
| 5 | 40 | | | |
| 6 | 38 | | | |
| 7 | 36 | | | |
| 8 | 34 | | | |
| 9 | 32 | | | |
| 10 | 31 | | | |
| 11 | 30 | | | |
| 12 | 29 | | | |
| 13 | 28 | | | |
| 14 | 27 | | | |
| 15 | 26 | | | |
| 16 | 25 | | | |
| 17 | 24 | | | |
| 18 | 23 | | | |
| 19 | 22 | | | |
| 20 | 21 | | | |
| 21 | 20 | | | |
| 22 | 19 | | | 18 |
| 23 | 18 | | | 16 |
| 24 | 17 | | | 14 |
| 25 | 16 | | | 12 |
| 26 | 15 | | | 10 |
| 27 | 14 | | | 8 |
| 28 | 13 | | | 6 |
| 29 | 12 | | | 4 |
| 30 | 11 | | | 2 |
| 31 | 10 | | | — |
| 32 | 9 | | | — |
| 33 | 8 | | | — |
| 34 | 7 | | | — |
| 35 | 6 | | | — |
| 36 | 5 | | | — |
| 37 | 4 | | | — |
| 38 | 3 | | | — |
| 39 | 2 | | | — |
| 40 | 1 | | | — |

In each event places 1 to 40 (1 to 30 in a Mass start) are awarded points, a victory being worth 60 points. The full point system is shown in the table on the right. In a Mass start event only 30 athletes are allowed to participate and the points awarded for ranks 22 to 30 differ from the system used in other events. Equal placings (ties) give an equal number of points. An athlete's total World Cup Score is the sum of all World Cup points earned in the season, minus the points from 4 events in which the athlete got their worst scores. Ties in this score are broken by comparing the tied athletes' number of victories. If this number is the same for the athletes in question, the number of second places is compared, and so on. If a tie cannot be broken by this procedure, it remains a tie.

22 of 26 competitions scored

| # | Name | KON IN | KON SP | KON2 SP | KON2 PU | HOC SP | HOC PU | HOC2 SP | HOC2 PU | HOC2 MS | OBE SP | OBE PS | OBE2 SP | OBE2 MS | ANT IN | ANT MS | POK SP | POK PU | POK IN | POK MS | NOV SP | NOV PU | NOV2 SP | NOV2 PU | OST SP | OST PU | OST MS | Total |
|---|---|---|---|---|---|---|---|---|---|---|---|---|---|---|---|---|---|---|---|---|---|---|---|---|---|---|---|---|
| 1. | Johannes Thingnes Bø (NOR) | 54 | 60 | 48 | 48 | 43 | 43 | 48 | 48 | 36 | 60 | ~~34~~ | 60 | 36 | ~~31~~ | 60 | 40 | 48 | 40 | 34 | ~~30~~ | 54 | ~~32~~ | 54 | 36 | 54 | 48 | 1052 |
| 2 | Sturla Holm Lægreid (NOR) | 60 | ~~23~~ | ~~19~~ | 43 | 32 | 38 | 60 | 60 | 38 | 48 | 60 | 54 | ~~29~~ | 54 | ~~27~~ | 36 | 38 | 60 | 60 | 43 | 40 | 40 | 43 | 38 | 60 | 34 | 1039 |
| 3 | Quentin Fillon Maillet (FRA) | 43 | 38 | ~~11~~ | 31 | 54 | 60 | 36 | 34 | 32 | 0 | – | 34 | 31 | 48 | 54 | 38 | 43 | 43 | 48 | 36 | 38 | 60 | 60 | 40 | ~~14~~ | 29 | 930 |
| 4 | Tarjei Bø (NOR) | 29 | ~~26~~ | 60 | 29 | 30 | 36 | ~~27~~ | 36 | 48 | 54 | 48 | 28 | 60 | ~~26~~ | 29 | 32 | 27 | 0 | 38 | 40 | 60 | 54 | 38 | 48 | 31 | 38 | 893 |
| 5 | Johannes Dale (NOR) | ~~18~~ | 28 | 36 | 32 | 60 | 48 | 54 | 38 | 26 | 40 | 54 | 40 | 25 | ~~14~~ | 32 | 43 | 30 | 48 | 54 | 23 | ~~6~~ | 34 | 32 | 34 | ~~13~~ | 32 | 843 |
| 6 | Sebastian Samuelsson (SWE) | 38 | 54 | 23 | 60 | 40 | 31 | 40 | 24 | 34 | 23 | 36 | 23 | 28 | 0 | 28 | 34 | 54 | ~~16~~ | 31 | 54 | 29 | 36 | ~~21~~ | 54 | 43 | ~~14~~ | 817 |
| 7 | Émilien Jacquelin (FRA) | 34 | 34 | ~~2~~ | 34 | 38 | 54 | 34 | 54 | 40 | 27 | 28 | 27 | 27 | ~~16~~ | 30 | 48 | 60 | 28 | ~~2~~ | 34 | 36 | 43 | 48 | ~~17~~ | 27 | 27 | 812 |
| 8 | Lukas Hofer (ITA) | ~~21~~ | 30 | 27 | 25 | 0 | 24 | 26 | ~~15~~ | 27 | 43 | 40 | 38 | 43 | 43 | 26 | 28 | 26 | 22 | 36 | ~~20~~ | 30 | 48 | 40 | 60 | 48 | 23 | 753 |
| 9 | Simon Desthieux (FRA) | 26 | 24 | 29 | 26 | 0 | ~~5~~ | 23 | 30 | ~~12~~ | 36 | 32 | 14 | 32 | 20 | 18 | 54 | 40 | ~~13~~ | 28 | 60 | 48 | 20 | 29 | 43 | 32 | 60 | 724 |
| 10 | Martin Ponsiluoma (SWE) | 0 | 48 | 32 | 27 | 26 | 23 | 32 | 40 | 54 | 38 | 29 | 32 | ~~14~~ | 38 | 31 | 60 | 28 | ~~6~~ | 22 | 21 | ~~7~~ | 27 | 22 | 27 | 38 | 18 | 713 |
| 11 | Jakov Fak (SLO) | 36 | 40 | 38 | 38 | 13 | 19 | 30 | 31 | 25 | 29 | 38 | 24 | 23 | ~~4~~ | 48 | ~~6~~ | ~~6~~ | 20 | 40 | 32 | 43 | 31 | 34 | ~~9~~ | 25 | 36 | 693 |
| 12 | Arnd Peiffer (GER) | 24 | 36 | 54 | 23 | DNS | – | 19 | 17 | 60 | 0 | 31 | 48 | 30 | 30 | 40 | 5 | 21 | 54 | 29 | 48 | 31 | 28 | 14 | – | – | – | 642 |
| 13 | Vetle Sjåstad Christiansen (NOR) | 4 | 43 | 26 | 36 | 36 | 29 | 43 | 43 | 28 | 0 | – | 25 | 26 | 36 | 43 | – | – | – | 25 | 17 | 3 | 21 | 30 | 29 | 36 | 43 | 621 |
| 14 | Benedikt Doll (GER) | 12 | ~~9~~ | 34 | 40 | 34 | 30 | 18 | 28 | 43 | 26 | 22 | 30 | 24 | 15 | 36 | ~~2~~ | ~~10~~ | 34 | 16 | 38 | 34 | 26 | 17 | 10 | ~~5~~ | 40 | 607 |
| 15 | Simon Eder (AUT) | 19 | ~~3~~ | 0 | 28 | 28 | 34 | 16 | 32 | 30 | 20 | 16 | 0 | 40 | 34 | 34 | 25 | 32 | 36 | 43 | 13 | ~~4~~ | 30 | 26 | 28 | 30 | 12 | 606 |
| 16 | Erik Lesser (GER) | 48 | 32 | 25 | 22 | 31 | 25 | 0 | 21 | 24 | 16 | 30 | 43 | 34 | 0 | 14 | 0 | – | – | – | 27 | 26 | 22 | 27 | 8 | 40 | 28 | 543 |
| 17 | Alexandr Loginov (RUS) | 31 | 29 | ~~7~~ | 17 | 21 | 20 | 24 | 19 | 31 | 22 | 24 | 20 | – | 60 | 22 | 15 | 25 | ~~10~~ | 32 | 18 | 22 | 24 | 24 | 15 | 26 | – | 541 |
| 18 | Eduard Latypov (RUS) | 0 | 21 | 0 | 20 | 20 | 17 | 11 | 12 | 16 | 30 | 19 | 26 | 4 | 0 | 21 | 31 | 36 | – | 27 | 31 | 18 | 16 | 20 | 18 | 23 | 54 | 491 |
| 19 | Fabien Claude (FRA) | 0 | 16 | 30 | 54 | 48 | 40 | 29 | 27 | 10 | 34 | 43 | 0 | 10 | 0 | 23 | 0 | 29 | 0 | – | 0 | 0 | 19 | 25 | 0 | 24 | 16 | 477 |
| 20 | Antonin Guigonnat (FRA) | 32 | 15 | 20 | 12 | 27 | 32 | 0 | 25 | 6 | 19 | 4 | 15 | 16 | 19 | 8 | 27 | 20 | – | 24 | 28 | 20 | 38 | 36 | 0 | 0 | 30 | 473 |
| 21 | Matvey Eliseev (RUS) | 15 | 27 | 8 | 13 | 9 | 22 | ~~3~~ | 23 | 21 | 25 | 25 | 31 | 38 | – | 6 | 22 | 24 | 0 | 26 | 7 | 17 | 25 | 31 | 20 | 0 | 24 | 459 |
| 22 | Benjamin Weger (SUI) | 8 | 19 | 43 | 18 | 15 | 18 | 25 | 29 | 23 | 32 | 21 | 17 | 48 | 21 | 24 | 0 | – | 0 | – | 5 | 15 | 15 | 2 | 12 | 18 | 21 | 449 |
| 23 | Michal Krčmář (CZE) | 30 | 25 | 31 | 21 | 10 | 14 | 9 | 7 | 22 | – | – | – | – | – | – | 30 | 19 | 14 | 10 | 2 | 27 | 29 | 28 | 23 | 20 | 10 | 381 |
| 24 | Felix Leitner (AUT) | 0 | 0 | 24 | 6 | 29 | 28 | 0 | – | – | 4 | 3 | 22 | 54 | 12 | 4 | 0 | 0 | 27 | – | 11 | 25 | 0 | 4 | 21 | 34 | 2 | 310 |
| 25 | Dmytro Pidruchnyi (UKR) | 0 | 0 | 6 | 3 | 0 | – | 38 | 20 | 14 | 0 | DNS | 36 | 21 | 0 | – | 18 | 13 | 0 | – | 26 | 32 | 6 | 18 | 7 | 28 | 8 | 294 |
| 26 | Anton Smolski (BLR) | 22 | 7 | 6 | 5 | 17 | 12 | 15 | 8 | – | 7 | 15 | 0 | – | 13 | – | 8 | 7 | 12 | – | 19 | 0 | 23 | 0 | 24 | 22 | 22 | 264 |
| 27 | Evgeniy Garanichev (RUS) | – | – | – | – | 12 | 27 | 28 | 16 | 20 | 0 | 0 | 0 | – | 27 | 2 | – | – | 25 | – | 4 | 0 | 11 | 9 | 30 | 29 | 20 | 260 |
| 28 | Roman Rees (GER) | 13 | 6 | 14 | 14 | 24 | 13 | 0 | – | – | – | – | 0 | – | 25 | 16 | – | – | 31 | – | 0 | – | 14 | 10 | 31 | 21 | 25 | 257 |
| 29 | Jesper Nelin (SWE) | 9 | 13 | 12 | 0 | 8 | 26 | 22 | 26 | 8 | 13 | 10 | DNS | – | 0 | – | 23 | 12 | 0 | 6 | 9 | 23 | 18 | 8 | 5 | 0 | 6 | 257 |
| 30 | Andrejs Rastorgujevs (LAT) | 20 | 18 | 0 | 9 | 5 | 11 | 0 | 9 | – | 1 | 0 | 29 | 12 | 0 | – | 26 | 31 | 23 | 18 | 24 | 19 | DNS | – | – | – | – | 255 |
| # | Name | KON IN | KON SP | KON2 SP | KON2 PU | HOC SP | HOC PU | HOC2 SP | HOC2 PU | HOC2 MS | OBE SP | OBE PS | OBE2 SP | OBE2 MS | ANT IN | ANT MS | POK SP | POK PU | POK IN | POK MS | NOV SP | NOV PU | NOV2 SP | NOV2 PU | OST SP | OST PU | OST MS | Total |
| 31 | Erlend Bjøntegaard (NOR) | 28 | 17 | 40 | 30 | 16 | DNS | – | – | – | – | – | 21 | 18 | 32 | 38 | – | – | – | – | – | – | – | – | – | – | – | 240 |
| 32 | David Komatz (AUT) | 11 | 4 | 0 | 0 | 19 | 7 | 20 | 11 | 18 | 24 | 18 | 0 | 6 | 29 | 25 | 3 | 17 | 0 | – | 0 | – | 0 | – | 6 | 0 | – | 218 |
| 33 | Artem Pryma (UKR) | 14 | 0 | 21 | 15 | 11 | 0 | 2 | 2 | – | 11 | 11 | 0 | – | 18 | – | 21 | 34 | 32 | 20 | 0 | DNS | 0 | DNS | 0 | – | – | 212 |
| 34 | Sergey Bocharnikov (BLR) | 17 | 12 | 28 | 2 | 0 | 0 | 13 | 14 | – | 28 | 26 | 0 | 20 | 0 | – | 9 | 0 | 0 | – | 0 | 24 | 5 | 0 | 2 | 0 | – | 200 |
| 35 | Christian Gow (CAN) | 23 | 0 | 16 | 8 | 0 | 6 | 4 | 10 | – | 12 | 27 | 0 | – | 0 | – | 24 | 11 | 0 | 30 | 10 | 10 | 0 | 3 | 0 | – | – | 194 |
| 36 | Tero Seppälä (FIN) | 0 | 0 | 10 | 4 | 25 | 15 | 10 | 0 | – | 0 | 0 | 10 | – | 22 | – | 13 | 9 | 4 | – | 15 | 8 | 1 | 16 | 0 | 7 | – | 169 |
| 37 | Ondřej Moravec (CZE) | 40 | 31 | 0 | 19 | 3 | 0 | 14 | 0 | 2 | – | – | 0 | – | 8 | – | 0 | 0 | 30 | – | 0 | 2 | 0 | 0 | – | – | – | 149 |
| 38 | Dominik Windisch (ITA) | – | – | 0 | – | 0 | 0 | 0 | 13 | – | 20 | 20 | 19 | 22 | 0 | – | 7 | 5 | 0 | – | 0 | 11 | 13 | 12 | 14 | 1 | – | 147 |
| 39 | Peppe Femling (SWE) | 0 | 0 | 15 | 10 | 22 | 8 | 0 | 0 | – | 5 | 0 | 18 | 2 | 0 | – | 10 | 4 | 26 | 8 | 0 | – | 0 | – | 0 | 12 | – | 140 |
| 40 | Aleksander Fjeld Andersen (NOR) | – | – | – | – | – | – | 17 | 18 | 29 | – | – | – | – | – | – | – | – | – | – | – | – | – | – | 25 | 19 | 26 | 134 |
| 41 | Scott Gow (CAN) | 0 | 0 | 0 | 0 | 0 | – | 0 | – | – | 0 | 1 | 2 | – | 0 | – | 0 | – | 1 | – | 22 | 21 | 10 | 5 | 16 | 17 | 31 | 126 |
| 42 | Vladimir Iliev (BUL) | 0 | 0 | 1 | 11 | 0 | – | 0 | – | – | 3 | 14 | – | – | – | – | 0 | 3 | 29 | – | 16 | 9 | 0 | – | 32 | 0 | 4 | 122 |
| 43 | Julian Eberhard (AUT) | 6 | 20 | 4 | 24 | 7 | DNS | 31 | 3 | 4 | – | – | – | – | 10 | – | 0 | – | 7 | – | – | – | – | – | – | – | – | 116 |
| 44 | Thomas Bormolini (ITA) | – | – | 0 | – | 4 | 16 | 0 | 5 | – | 15 | 17 | 6 | – | 0 | – | 14 | 22 | – | 14 | 0 | 0 | 2 | 0 | 0 | 0 | – | 115 |
| 45 | Florent Claude (BEL) | 7 | 1 | 3 | 0 | 0 | – | 0 | – | – | 0 | 0 | 7 | – | 0 | – | 19 | 15 | 21 | 12 | 14 | 0 | 0 | – | 0 | 16 | – | 115 |
| 46 | Said Karimulla Khalili (RUS) | – | – | – | – | 0 | – | 0 | – | – | – | – | – | – | – | – | 0 | – | 38 | 21 | 25 | 5 | 3 | 19 | 0 | – | – | 111 |
| 47 | Jake Brown (USA) | 0 | 11 | 0 | 0 | 0 | – | 0 | – | – | – | – | 0 | – | 0 | – | 29 | 16 | 19 | 4 | 0 | – | 8 | 0 | 19 | 3 | – | 109 |
| 48 | Johannes Kühn (GER) | 1 | 22 | 13 | 16 | 6 | 9 | 0 | 0 | – | – | – | 1 | – | 23 | – | 0 | 0 | 17 | – | DNF | – | 0 | – | 0 | – | – | 108 |
| 49 | Miha Dovzan (SLO) | 0 | 0 | 0 | – | 0 | 4 | 0 | – | – | 0 | 0 | 4 | – | 0 | – | 16 | 18 | 18 | 23 | 0 | 13 | 4 | 7 | 0 | 0 | – | 107 |
| 50 | Jeremy Finello (SUI) | 0 | 0 | 18 | 0 | 0 | – | 0 | 0 | – | 0 | 13 | 0 | – | 24 | 10 | 0 | – | 24 | – | 0 | – | 0 | 0 | 4 | 0 | – | 93 |
| 51 | Didier Bionaz (ITA) | 0 | 0 | 0 | – | 0 | 0 | 1 | 22 | – | 0 | 0 | 0 | – | 28 | 20 | 20 | 0 | 0 | – | 0 | 1 | 0 | 0 | 0 | – | – | 92 |
| 52 | Anton Dudchenko (UKR) | 0 | – | 0 | – | 0 | 0 | 21 | 6 | – | – | – | 0 | – | 40 | 12 | 0 | – | 0 | – | 0 | – | 0 | – | 0 | 4 | – | 83 |
| 53 | Endre Strømsheim (NOR) | – | – | – | – | – | – | – | – | – | – | – | – | – | – | – | – | – | – | – | 29 | 28 | 0 | 23 | 0 | 0 | – | 80 |
| 54 | Philipp Horn (GER) | – | – | – | – | 18 | 21 | 0 | – | – | 18 | 12 | 0 | – | 11 | – | – | – | – | – | – | – | 0 | – | 0 | – | – | 80 |
| 55 | Vytautas Strolia (LTU) | 25 | 14 | 0 | 0 | 0 | 0 | 0 | – | – | 21 | 0 | 14 | – | 0 | – | 0 | – | 0 | – | 0 | – | 0 | – | 0 | – | – | 74 |
| 56 | Raman Yaliotnau (BLR) | 0 | 10 | 0 | – | 0 | 0 | 5 | 0 | – | 31 | 23 | 0 | – | – | – | – | – | – | – | – | – | – | – | – | – | – | 69 |
| 57 | Sean Doherty (USA) | 2 | 0 | 0 | 0 | 1 | 0 | 0 | 0 | – | 6 | 5 | 5 | – | 0 | – | 0 | – | 0 | – | 12 | 14 | 9 | 6 | 0 | – | – | 60 |
| 58 | Maksim Varabei (BLR) | 0 | 2 | 22 | 7 | 0 | – | 8 | 0 | – | 0 | 0 | 0 | – | 0 | – | 17 | 0 | 0 | – | 0 | 0 | 0 | 0 | 1 | 0 | – | 57 |
| 59 | Jakub Štvrtecký (CZE) | 0 | 0 | 0 | 0 | 0 | 0 | 0 | – | – | 0 | 6 | 0 | – | 0 | – | 0 | – | 0 | – | 0 | 0 | 12 | 0 | 22 | 10 | – | 50 |
| 60 | Leif Nordgren (USA) | 16 | 0 | 0 | – | 0 | – | 12 | 1 | – | 2 | 0 | 0 | – | 0 | – | 0 | 8 | 9 | – | 0 | 0 | 0 | – | 0 | – | – | 48 |
| # | Name | KON IN | KON SP | KON2 SP | KON2 PU | HOC SP | HOC PU | HOC2 SP | HOC2 PU | HOC2 MS | OBE SP | OBE PS | OBE2 SP | OBE2 MS | ANT IN | ANT MS | POK SP | POK PU | POK IN | POK MS | NOV SP | NOV PU | NOV2 SP | NOV2 PU | OST SP | OST PU | OST MS | Total |
| 61 | Thierry Langer (BEL) | 0 | 8 | 9 | 0 | 0 | – | 0 | 0 | – | 0 | – | 0 | – | 0 | – | 0 | 0 | 0 | – | 0 | 0 | 0 | – | 26 | 0 | – | 43 |
| 62 | Bogdan Tsymbal (UKR) | 0 | 0 | 0 | – | 0 | – | 0 | – | – | – | – | – | – | – | – | 11 | 23 | – | – | 0 | – | 0 | – | 0 | 8 | – | 42 |
| 63 | Tuomas Harjula (FIN) | 27 | 0 | 0 | – | – | – | 0 | 0 | – | 0 | 0 | 0 | – | 0 | – | 0 | 14 | 0 | – | 0 | LAP | 0 | 0 | 0 | – | – | 41 |
| 64 | Olli Hiidensalo (FIN) | – | 0 | 0 | 0 | 23 | 3 | 0 | – | – | 0 | – | – | – | 0 | – | 12 | 0 | 0 | – | – | – | – | – | – | – | – | 38 |
| 65 | Artem Tyshchenko (UKR) | – | – | – | – | – | – | – | – | – | 0 | – | 0 | – | 7 | – | – | – | 0 | – | 6 | 16 | 0 | – | 0 | 0 | – | 29 |
| 66 | Michal Šíma (SVK) | 0 | 0 | 0 | – | 0 | 0 | 0 | – | – | 0 | – | 16 | 8 | 0 | – | 4 | 0 | 0 | – | 0 | – | 0 | – | 0 | – | – | 28 |
| 67 | Philipp Nawrath (GER) | – | – | – | – | – | – | – | – | – | – | – | – | – | – | – | – | – | – | – | 0 | 12 | – | – | 0 | 15 | – | 27 |
| 68 | Karol Dombrovski (LTU) | 5 | 0 | 0 | 0 | 0 | – | 0 | 0 | – | 9 | 9 | 0 | – | 0 | – | 1 | 0 | 3 | – | 0 | – | 0 | – | 0 | – | – | 27 |
| 69 | Sivert Guttorm Bakken (NOR) | – | – | – | – | – | – | – | – | – | 17 | 8 | – | – | – | – | – | – | – | – | – | – | – | – | – | – | – | 25 |
| 70 | Kirill Streltsov (RUS) | – | – | – | – | – | – | – | – | – | 14 | 0 | 11 | – | 0 | – | – | – | – | – | 0 | – | 0 | – | 0 | – | – | 25 |
| 71 | Harald Lemmerer (AUT) | 10 | 0 | 0 | – | 0 | 0 | 6 | 0 | – | 0 | – | 9 | – | 0 | – | – | – | – | – | 0 | – | 0 | – | 0 | – | – | 25 |
| 72 | Alexandr Mukhin (KAZ) | 0 | 0 | 0 | – | 0 | – | 0 | – | – | 0 | 0 | 12 | – | 0 | – | 0 | – | 0 | – | 0 | – | 0 | – | 11 | 0 | – | 23 |
| 73 | Tommaso Giacomel (ITA) | – | – | – | – | – | – | – | – | – | 0 | 7 | 3 | – | 0 | – | – | – | 0 | – | 0 | 0 | 0 | 11 | 0 | 2 | – | 23 |
| 74 | Mikuláš Karlík (CZE) | – | – | – | – | – | – | – | – | – | – | – | 0 | – | – | – | 0 | – | – | – | – | – | 7 | 15 | 0 | 0 | – | 22 |
| 75 | Martin Jäger (SUI) | – | – | – | – | – | – | – | – | – | – | – | – | – | – | – | 0 | 0 | 0 | – | 8 | 0 | 0 | 13 | 0 | – | – | 21 |
| 76 | Anton Babikov (RUS) | – | – | 0 | 0 | 0 | 10 | 7 | 4 | – | 0 | – | – | – | – | – | 0 | 0 | – | – | – | – | – | – | – | – | – | 21 |
| 77 | Mikita Labastau (BLR) | 0 | 0 | – | – | 0 | – | – | – | – | – | – | 0 | – | 9 | – | – | – | 11 | – | 0 | – | 0 | – | DNS | – | – | 20 |
| 78 | Mihail Usov (MDA) | – | – | – | – | – | – | 0 | – | – | 0 | – | 0 | – | – | – | 0 | 0 | 0 | – | 0 | – | 17 | 0 | 0 | 0 | – | 17 |
| 79 | Klemen Bauer (SLO) | 0 | 0 | 17 | 0 | 0 | – | 0 | 0 | – | – | – | – | – | – | – | 0 | LAP | – | – | 0 | – | 0 | – | – | – | – | 17 |
| 80 | Kosuke Ozaki (JPN) | 0 | 0 | – | – | – | – | 0 | 0 | – | 0 | – | 0 | – | 17 | – | 0 | – | 0 | – | – | – | 0 | – | – | – | – | 17 |
| 81 | Milan Žemlička (CZE) | – | – | – | – | – | – | 0 | 0 | – | 0 | 0 | – | – | 2 | – | – | – | 15 | – | 0 | – | – | – | – | – | – | 17 |
| 82 | Tsukasa Kobonoki (JPN) | – | – | 0 | – | 0 | 0 | 0 | – | – | – | – | 0 | – | – | – | 0 | 0 | 0 | – | 3 | 0 | 0 | 0 | 13 | 0 | – | 16 |
| 83 | Justus Strelow (GER) | – | – | – | – | – | – | – | – | – | – | – | – | – | – | – | – | – | – | – | – | – | – | – | 4 | 11 | – | 15 |
| 84 | Rok Trsan (SLO) | 0 | – | 0 | – | 14 | 0 | 0 | 0 | – | 0 | – | 0 | – | 0 | – | 0 | 0 | 0 | – | 0 | 0 | 0 | 0 | 0 | 0 | – | 14 |
| 85 | Rene Zahkna (EST) | 0 | 0 | 0 | – | 0 | – | – | – | – | 0 | – | 0 | – | 3 | – | 0 | 1 | 8 | – | 0 | 0 | – | – | 0 | – | – | 12 |
| 86 | Emilien Claude (FRA) | – | – | – | – | – | – | – | – | – | 8 | 2 | 0 | – | 0 | – | – | – | – | – | – | – | 0 | 0 | 0 | – | – | 10 |
| 87 | David Zobel (GER) | – | – | – | – | – | – | – | – | – | – | – | – | – | – | – | – | – | – | – | – | – | – | – | 0 | 9 | – | 9 |
| 88 | Pavel Magazeev (MDA) | – | – | 0 | – | 0 | – | 0 | – | – | 0 | 0 | 8 | – | – | – | 0 | – | 0 | – | 0 | – | 0 | 0 | 0 | – | – | 8 |
| 89 | Tomas Krupcik (CZE) | 0 | – | 0 | 1 | 0 | – | – | – | – | DNS | – | – | – | 6 | – | – | – | – | – | – | – | – | – | – | – | – | 7 |
| 90 | George Buta (ROU) | – | – | DNS | – | – | – | 0 | – | – | 0 | – | – | – | 0 | – | 0 | 2 | 5 | – | 0 | – | – | – | 0 | DNS | – | 7 |
| # | Name | KON IN | KON SP | KON2 SP | KON2 PU | HOC SP | HOC PU | HOC2 SP | HOC2 PU | HOC2 MS | OBE SP | OBE PS | OBE2 SP | OBE2 MS | ANT IN | ANT MS | POK SP | POK PU | POK IN | POK MS | NOV SP | NOV PU | NOV2 SP | NOV2 PU | OST SP | OST PU | OST MS | Total |
| 91 | Filip Fjeld Andersen (NOR) | – | – | – | – | – | – | – | – | – | – | – | – | – | – | – | – | – | – | – | – | – | – | – | 0 | 6 | – | 6 |
| 92 | Alex Cisar (SLO) | – | 0 | – | – | – | – | – | – | – | 0 | – | 0 | – | 5 | – | – | – | 0 | – | – | – | – | – | 0 | – | – | 5 |
| 93 | Semen Suchilov (RUS) | 0 | 5 | 0 | – | – | – | – | – | – | – | – | – | – | – | – | – | – | – | – | – | – | – | – | – | – | – | 5 |
| 94 | Petr Pashchenko (RUS) | 4 | 0 | 0 | – | – | – | – | – | – | – | – | – | – | – | – | – | – | – | – | – | – | – | – | – | – | – | 4 |
| 95 | Adam Runnalls (CAN) | 0 | 0 | 0 | 0 | 0 | 0 | 0 | 0 | – | 0 | – | 0 | – | 0 | – | 0 | 0 | 2 | – | 0 | 0 | 0 | – | – | – | – | 2 |
| 96 | Grzegorz Guzik (POL) | 0 | 0 | 0 | 0 | 0 | 2 | 0 | – | – | 0 | 0 | 0 | – | 0 | – | 0 | – | 0 | – | 0 | – | 0 | – | – | – | – | 2 |
| 97 | Dimitar Gerdzhikov (BUL) | 0 | – | – | – | 2 | 0 | 0 | – | – | 0 | – | – | – | – | – | 0 | LAP | 0 | – | 0 | – | 0 | – | – | – | – | 2 |
| 98 | Paul Schommer (USA) | 0 | 0 | 0 | – | 0 | 1 | 0 | – | – | 0 | – | 0 | – | 0 | – | 0 | – | 0 | – | 0 | – | 0 | – | 0 | – | – | 1 |
| 99 | Anton Sinapov (BUL) | 0 | 0 | 0 | 0 | 0 | – | 0 | – | – | 0 | – | – | – | – | – | 0 | – | 0 | – | 0 | – | 0 | 1 | 0 | 0 | – | 1 |
| 100 | Andrzej Nedza-Kubiniec (POL) | 0 | 0 | 0 | – | 0 | – | – | – | – | 0 | 0 | 0 | – | 1 | – | 0 | – | 0 | – | 0 | – | 0 | – | – | – | – | 1 |
| 101 | Šimon Bartko (SVK) | – | 0 | – | – | 0 | – | – | – | – | 0 | – | – | – | 0 | – | 0 | – | – | – | 1 | 0 | 0 | – | 0 | – | – | 1 |
