= 2021–22 Biathlon IBU Cup =

2021–2022 season of the Biathlon IBU Cup

Discipline	Men	Women
Overall	(Norway) Erlend Bjøntegaard	(France) Lou Jeanmonnot
U25	(Norway) Sverre Dahlen Aspenes	(France) Lou Jeanmonnot
Individual	(Russia) Anton Babikov	(Russia) Evgeniya Burtasova
Sprint	(Norway) Erlend Bjøntegaard	(France) Caroline Colombo
Pursuit	(Norway) Erlend Bjøntegaard	(Russia) Evgeniya Burtasova
Super sprint	(Germany) Justus Strelow	(France) Lou Jeanmonnot
Mass start	(Norway) Endre Strømsheim	(Norway) Ragnhild Femsteinevik
Nations Cup	Norway	France
- Mixed: France

Competition
Locations	8	8
Individual	23	23
Mixed	6	6
Cancelled	1	–

The 2021–22 Biathlon IBU Cup was a multi-race tournament over a season of biathlon, organised by the IBU. IBU Cup is the second-rank competition in biathlon after the Biathlon World Cup. The season started on 25 November 2021 in Idre, Sweden and ended on 13 March 2022 in Ridnaun-Val Ridanna, Italy.

The defending overall champions from the 2020–21 Biathlon IBU Cup were Filip Fjeld Andersen from Norway and Vanessa Voigt from Germany.

Due to the Russian invasion of Ukraine, Russian and Belarusian biathletes are only allowed to compete under a neutral flag since the competition in Kontiolahti. Their performances are not included in the previous classifications of their countries. Previously, the Ukrainian national team announced the withdrawal from the biathlon competition by the end of the season.

On 2 March 2022, IBU announced that Russian and Belarusian biathletes are banned from IBU events.

== Calendar ==
Below is the IBU Cup calendar for the 2021–22 season.

Location	Date	Individual / Short individual	Super sprint	Sprint	Pursuit	Mass start	Mixed relay	Single mixed relay	Details
(Sweden) Idre	25–28 November			● ●	●				
(Norway) Sjusjøen	1–4 December		●	●		●			
(Austria) Obertilliach	16–19 December	●		●			●	●	
(Slovakia) Brezno-Osrblie	8–9 January			● ●					
(Slovakia) Brezno-Osrblie	12–15 January	●		●	●				
(Germany) Arber	26–30 January	●		●	●		●	●	European Championships
(Czech Republic) Nové Město	3–5 February			● ●					
(Switzerland) Lenzerheide	3–6 March		●	●		●			
(Italy) Ridnaun-Val Ridanna	10–13 March			●	●		●	●	
Total: 52 (23 men's, 23 women's, 6 mixed)		3	2	12	4	2	3	3	

Notes

- All European Championships races included in the IBU Cup total score.
- The round originally scheduled at Duszniki-Zdrój, Poland was relocated to Brezno-Osrblie, Slovakia.

== IBU Cup podiums ==
=== Men ===
Stage	Date	Place	Discipline	Winner	Second	Third	Yellow bib (After competition)	Dark blue bib (After competition)	Ref
1	25 November 2021	(Sweden) Idre	10 km Sprint	(Germany) Lucas Fratzscher	(Norway) Sverre Dahlen Aspenes	(Germany) Johannes Kühn	(Germany) Lucas Fratzscher	(Norway) Sverre Dahlen Aspenes	
1	27 November 2021	(Sweden) Idre	10 km Sprint	(Norway) Aleksander Fjeld Andersen	(Germany) Lucas Fratzscher	(Russia) Vasilii Tomshin	(Germany) Lucas Fratzscher	(Norway) Aleksander F. Andersen	
1	28 November 2021	(Sweden) Idre	12.5 km Pursuit	(Russia) Vasilii Tomshin	(Norway) Aleksander F. Andersen	(Russia) Alexander Povarnitsyn	(Germany) Lucas Fratzscher	(Norway) Aleksander F. Andersen	
2	1 December 2021	(Norway) Sjusjøen	7.5 km Super Sprint	(Norway) Filip Fjeld Andersen	(Norway) Erlend Bjøntegaard	(Germany) Justus Strelow	(Germany) Lucas Fratzscher	(Norway) Aleksander F. Andersen	
2	3 December 2021	(Norway) Sjusjøen	10 km Sprint	(Russia) Anton Babikov	(Norway) Filip Fjeld Andersen	(Norway) Håvard Gutubø Bogetveit	(Germany) Lucas Fratzscher	(Norway) Aleksander F. Andersen	
2	4 December 2021	(Norway) Sjusjøen	15 km Mass start	(Russia) Anton Babikov	(Norway) Erlend Bjøntegaard	(France) Rémi Broutier	(Germany) Lucas Fratzscher	(Norway) Aleksander F. Andersen	
3	16 December 2021	(Austria) Obertilliach	20 km Individual	(Germany) David Zobel	(Italy) Dominik Windisch	(Russia) Maxim Tsvetkov	(Germany) Lucas Fratzscher	(Norway) Aleksander F. Andersen	
3	18 December 2021	(Austria) Obertilliach	10 km Sprint	(Norway) Håvard Gutubø Bogetveit	(Norway) Erlend Bjøntegaard	(Russia) Maxim Tsvetkov	(Germany) Lucas Fratzscher	(Norway) Aleksander F. Andersen	
4	8 January 2022	(Slovakia) Brezno-Osrblie	10 km Sprint	(Norway) Aleksander Fjeld Andersen	(Russia) Nikita Porshnev	(Russia) Ilnaz Mukhamedzianov	(Norway) Aleksander F. Andersen	(Norway) Aleksander F. Andersen	
4	9 January 2022	(Slovakia) Brezno-Osrblie	10 km Sprint	(Norway) Sindre Fjellheim Jorde	(Norway) Erlend Bjøntegaard	(Norway) Johannes Dale	(Norway) Erlend Bjøntegaard	(Norway) Aleksander F. Andersen	
5	12 January 2022	(Slovakia) Brezno-Osrblie	15 km Short Individual	(Norway) Vetle Paulsen	(Norway) Martin Femsteinevik	(Germany) Justus Strelow	(Norway) Erlend Bjøntegaard	(Norway) Aleksander F. Andersen	
5	15 January 2022	(Slovakia) Brezno-Osrblie	10 km Sprint	(France) Émilien Claude	(Norway) Sindre Pettersen	(Russia) Petr Pashchenko	(Norway) Erlend Bjøntegaard	(Norway) Aleksander F. Andersen	
5	15 January 2022	(Slovakia) Brezno-Osrblie	12.5 km Pursuit	Сancelled					
EC	26 January 2022	(Germany) Arber	20 km Individual	(Norway) Sverre Dahlen Aspenes	(Russia) Anton Babikov	(Germany) Matthias Dorfer	(Norway) Erlend Bjøntegaard	(Norway) Aleksander F. Andersen	
EC	28 January 2022	(Germany) Arber	10 km Sprint	(Norway) Erlend Bjøntegaard	(Russia) Nikita Porshnev	(Germany) Lucas Fratzscher	(Norway) Erlend Bjøntegaard	(Norway) Aleksander F. Andersen	
EC	29 January 2022	(Germany) Arber	12.5 km Pursuit	(Norway) Sverre Dahlen Aspenes	(Russia) Petr Pashchenko	(Germany) Lucas Fratzscher	(Norway) Erlend Bjøntegaard	(Norway) Sverre Dahlen Aspenes	
6	3 February 2022	(Czech Republic) Nové Město	10 km Sprint	(Norway) Sverre Dahlen Aspenes	(Russia) Alexander Povarnitsyn	(Germany) Philipp Horn	(Norway) Erlend Bjøntegaard	(Norway) Sverre Dahlen Aspenes	
6	5 February 2022	(Czech Republic) Nové Město	10 km Sprint	(Norway) Aleksander Fjeld Andersen	(Germany) Justus Strelow	(Norway) Sverre Dahlen Aspenes	(Norway) Erlend Bjøntegaard	(Norway) Sverre Dahlen Aspenes	
7	3 March 2022	(Switzerland) Lenzerheide	10 km Sprint	(Norway) Johannes Dale	(Norway) Endre Strømsheim	(Germany) Lucas Fratzscher	(Norway) Erlend Bjøntegaard	(Norway) Sverre Dahlen Aspenes	
7	5 March 2022	(Switzerland) Lenzerheide	7.5 km Super Sprint	(Germany) Philipp Horn	(Germany) Justus Strelow	(France) Émilien Claude	(Norway) Erlend Bjøntegaard	(Norway) Sverre Dahlen Aspenes	
7	6 March 2022	(Switzerland) Lenzerheide	15 km Mass start	(Norway) Endre Strømsheim	(Norway) Johannes Dale	(Germany) Philipp Horn	(Norway) Erlend Bjøntegaard	(Norway) Sverre Dahlen Aspenes	
8	10 March 2022	(Italy) Ridnaun-Val Ridanna	10 km Sprint	(Norway) Erlend Bjøntegaard	(Germany) Marco Groß	(Germany) Philipp Horn	(Norway) Erlend Bjøntegaard	(Norway) Sverre Dahlen Aspenes	
8	12 March 2022	(Italy) Ridnaun-Val Ridanna	12.5 km Pursuit	(Germany) Philipp Horn	(Norway) Erlend Bjøntegaard	(Germany) Marco Groß	(Norway) Erlend Bjøntegaard	(Norway) Sverre Dahlen Aspenes	

=== Women ===
Stage	Date	Place	Discipline	Winner	Second	Third	Yellow bib (After competition)	Dark blue bib (After competition)	Ref
1	25 November 2021	(Sweden) Idre	7.5 km Sprint	(Germany) Marion Wiesensarter	(France) Caroline Colombo	(Ukraine) Darya Blashko	(Germany) Marion Wiesensarter	(Russia) Anastasia Shevchenko	
1	27 November 2021	(Sweden) Idre	7.5 km Sprint	(Germany) Franziska Hildebrand	(France) Caroline Colombo	(Switzerland) Irene Cadurisch (Ukraine) Darya Blashko	(France) Caroline Colombo	(Russia) Anastasia Shevchenko	
1	28 November 2021	(Sweden) Idre	10 km Pursuit	(Germany) Franziska Hildebrand	(Russia) Evgeniya Burtasova	(France) Paula Botet	(Russia) Evgeniya Burtasova	(France) Paula Botet	
2	1 December 2021	(Norway) Sjusjøen	7.5 km Super Sprint	(Italy) Linda Zingerle	(Ukraine) Iryna Petrenko	(Russia) Anastasia Shevchenko	(Germany) Franziska Hildebrand	(Russia) Anastasia Shevchenko	
2	3 December 2021	(Norway) Sjusjøen	7.5 km Sprint	(Russia) Anastasia Shevchenko	(Norway) Karoline Erdal	(France) Paula Botet	(Russia) Anastasia Shevchenko	(Russia) Anastasia Shevchenko	
2	4 December 2021	(Norway) Sjusjøen	12 km Mass start	(Norway) Ragnhild Femsteinevik	(Russia) Anastasia Shevchenko	(France) Paula Botet	(Russia) Anastasia Shevchenko	(Russia) Anastasia Shevchenko	
3	16 December 2021	(Austria) Obertilliach	15 km Individual	(Sweden) Elisabeth Högberg	(Germany) Franziska Hildebrand	(Norway) Marthe Kråkstad Johansen	(Russia) Anastasia Shevchenko	(Russia) Anastasia Shevchenko	
3	18 December 2021	(Austria) Obertilliach	7.5 km Sprint	(Russia) Anastasia Shevchenko	(France) Paula Botet	(Norway) Karoline Offigstad Knotten	(Russia) Anastasia Shevchenko	(Russia) Anastasia Shevchenko	
4	8 January 2022	(Slovakia) Brezno-Osrblie	7.5 km Sprint	(Norway) Ragnhild Femsteinevik	(France) Gilonne Guigonnat	(Norway) Juni Arnekleiv	(Russia) Anastasia Shevchenko	(Russia) Anastasia Shevchenko	
4	9 January 2022	(Slovakia) Brezno-Osrblie	7.5 km Sprint	(Russia) Larisa Kuklina	(Norway) Ragnhild Femsteinevik	(Russia) Victoria Slivko	(Russia) Anastasia Shevchenko	(Russia) Anastasia Shevchenko	
5	12 January 2022	(Slovakia) Brezno-Osrblie	12.5 km Short Individual	(Germany) Janina Hettich	(Russia) Evgeniya Burtasova	(Norway) Marthe Kråkstad Johansen	(Sweden) Elisabeth Högberg	(Russia) Anastasia Shevchenko	
5	14 January 2022	(Slovakia) Brezno-Osrblie	7.5 km Sprint	(France) Camille Bened	(Russia) Evgeniya Burtasova	(Russia) Natalia Gerbulova	(Russia) Evgeniya Burtasova	(Russia) Anastasia Shevchenko	
5	15 January 2022	(Slovakia) Brezno-Osrblie	10 km Pursuit	(Russia) Evgeniya Burtasova	(Sweden) Sara Andersson	(Norway) Jenny Enodd	(Russia) Evgeniya Burtasova	(Russia) Anastasia Shevchenko	
EC	26 January 2022	(Germany) Arber	15 km Individual	(Russia) Evgeniya Burtasova	(Moldova) Alina Stremous	(Russia) Natalia Gerbulova	(Russia) Evgeniya Burtasova	(Russia) Anastasia Shevchenko	
EC	28 January 2022	(Germany) Arber	7.5 km Sprint	(Norway) Ragnhild Femsteinevik	(Germany) Franziska Hildebrand	(Germany) Janina Hettich	(Russia) Evgeniya Burtasova	(Russia) Anastasia Shevchenko	
EC	29 January 2022	(Germany) Arber	10 km Pursuit	(Moldova) Alina Stremous	(Germany) Janina Hettich	(Norway) Jenny Enodd	(Russia) Evgeniya Burtasova	(Russia) Anastasia Shevchenko	
6	3 February 2022	(Czech Republic) Nové Město	7.5 km Sprint	(France) Caroline Colombo	(Austria) Anna Gandler	(Russia) Larisa Kuklina	(Russia) Evgeniya Burtasova	(Russia) Anastasia Shevchenko	
6	5 February 2022	(Czech Republic) Nové Město	7.5 km Sprint	(Belarus) Irina Kruchinkina	(Germany) Janina Hettich	(Norway) Marthe Kråkstad Johansen	(Russia) Evgeniya Burtasova	(Russia) Anastasia Shevchenko	
7	3 March 2022	(Switzerland) Lenzerheide	7.5 km Sprint	(Italy) Michela Carrara	(Norway) Karoline Erdal	(France) Caroline Colombo	(Russia) Evgeniya Burtasova	(France) Lou Jeanmonnot	
7	5 March 2022	(Switzerland) Lenzerheide	7.5 km Super Sprint	(Norway) Ragnhild Femsteinevik	(Germany) Anna Weidel	(France) Lou Jeanmonnot	(Russia) Evgeniya Burtasova	(France) Lou Jeanmonnot	
7	6 March 2022	(Switzerland) Lenzerheide	12.5 km Mass start	(Germany) Hanna Kebinger	(Norway) Jenny Enodd	(France) Lou Jeanmonnot	(France) Lou Jeanmonnot	(France) Lou Jeanmonnot	
8	10 March 2022	(Italy) Ridnaun-Val Ridanna	7.5 km Sprint	(France) Lou Jeanmonnot	(Sweden) Elisabeth Högberg	(Norway) Karoline Erdal	(France) Lou Jeanmonnot	(France) Lou Jeanmonnot	
8	12 March 2022	(Italy) Ridnaun-Val Ridanna	10 km Pursuit	(France) Caroline Colombo	(Norway) Ragnhild Femsteinevik	(France) Lou Jeanmonnot	(France) Lou Jeanmonnot	(France) Lou Jeanmonnot	

=== Mixed ===
Stage	Date	Place	Discipline	Winner	Second	Third	Leader (After competition)	Ref
3	19 December 2021	(Austria) Obertilliach	4 x 6 km	Russia Anastasia Shevchenko; Anastasiia Goreeva; Nikita Porshnev; Maxim Tsvetkov	Norway Marthe Kråkstad Johansen; Åsne Skrede; Håvard Gutubø Bogetveit; Erlend Bjøntegaard	Italy Beatrice Trabucchi; Michela Carrara; Didier Bionaz; Dominik Windisch	Russia	
3	19 December 2021	(Austria) Obertilliach	1 x 6 km + 1 x 7.5 km	Russia Evgeniya Burtasova; Anton Babikov	Sweden Elisabeth Högberg; Viktor Brandt	Italy Rebecca Passler; Patrick Braunhofer	Russia	
EC	30 January 2022	(Germany) Arber	4 x 7.5 km	Norway Erlend Bjøntegaard; Johannes Dale; Jenny Enodd; Ragnhild Femsteinevik	Germany Lucas Fratzscher; Philipp Horn; Janina Hettich; Sophia Schneider	Switzerland Serafin Wiestner; Martin Jäger; Elisa Gasparin; Aita Gasparin	Russia	
EC	30 January 2022	(Germany) Arber	1 x 6 km + 1 x 7.5 km	Russia Anton Babikov; Evgeniya Burtasova	France Émilien Claude; Lou Jeanmonnot	Germany Justus Strelow; Franziska Hildebrand	Russia	
8	13 March 2022	(Italy) Ridnaun-Val Ridanna	1 x 6 km + 1 x 7.5 km	Germany Anna Weidel; Marco Groß	France Lou Jeanmonnot; Émilien Claude	Norway Ragnhild Femsteinevik; Sverre Dahlen Aspenes	Norway	
8	13 March 2022	(Italy) Ridnaun-Val Ridanna	4 x 6 km	France Camille Bened; Caroline Colombo; Sebastien Mahon; Hugo Rivail	Germany Marion Wiesensarter; Hanna Kebinger; Johannes Werner Donhauser; Philipp Horn	Sweden Ingela Andersson; Elisabeth Högberg; Emil Nykvist; Henning Sjökvist	France	

== Standings (men) ==
=== Overall ===
Rank	after all 22 races	Points
Yellow bib	(Norway) Erlend Bjøntegaard	829
2.	(Norway) Håvard Gutubø Bogetveit	647
3.	(Norway) Sverre Dahlen Aspenes	639
4.	(Germany) Lucas Fratzscher	605
5.	(Germany) Justus Strelow	565

=== Under 25 ===
Rank	after all 22 races	Points
Dark blue bib	(Norway) Sverre Dahlen Aspenes	639
2.	(France) Émilien Claude	549
3.	(Norway) Aleksander Fjeld Andersen	548
4.	(Russia) Vasilii Tomshin	467
5.	(Norway) Johannes Dale	402

=== Individual ===
Rank	after all 3 races	Points
Red bib	(Russia) Anton Babikov	97
2.	(France) Oscar Lombardot	94
3.	(Norway) Sverre Dahlen Aspenes	88
4.	(Germany) Justus Strelow	82
5.	(Russia) Nikita Porshnev	79

=== Sprint ===
Rank	after all 12 races	Points
Red bib	(Norway) Erlend Bjøntegaard	436
2.	(Norway) Håvard Gutubø Bogetveit	385
3.	(Norway) Sverre Dahlen Aspenes	374
4.	(Norway) Aleksander Fjeld Andersen	366
5.	(France) Émilien Claude	343

=== Pursuit ===
Rank	after all 3 races	Points
Red bib	(Norway) Erlend Bjøntegaard	133
2.	(Norway) Sverre Dahlen Aspenes	130
3.	(Germany) Philipp Horn	90
4.	(Russia) Vasilii Tomshin	89
5.	(Germany) Lucas Fratzscher	86

=== Mass start ===
Rank	after all 2 races	Points
Red bib	(Norway) Endre Strømsheim	100
2.	(Norway) Erlend Bjøntegaard	92
3.	(Germany) Lucas Fratzscher	77
4.	(Germany) Marco Groß	66
5.	(Russia) Anton Babikov	60

=== Super Sprint ===
Rank	after all 2 races	Points
Red bib	(Germany) Justus Strelow	102
2.	(Norway) Erlend Bjøntegaard	92
3.	(Germany) Lucas Fratzscher	79
4.	(France) Émilien Claude	77
5.	(Norway) Håvard Gutubø Bogetveit	77

=== Nations Cup ===
Rank	after all 23 races	Points
1.	Norway	8401
2.	Germany	8030
3.	France	7209
4.	Italy	6864
5.	Russia	6494

== Standings (women) ==
=== Overall ===
Rank	after all 23 races	Points
Yellow bib	(France) Lou Jeanmonnot	668
2.	(Norway) Ragnhild Femsteinevik	643
3.	(Sweden) Elisabeth Högberg	590
4.	(Norway) Marthe Kråkstad Johansen	562
5.	(France) Camille Bened	555

=== Under 25 ===
Rank	after all 23 races	Points
Dark blue bib	(France) Lou Jeanmonnot	668
2.	(Norway) Marthe Kråkstad Johansen	562
3.	(France) Camille Bened	555
4.	(France) Sophie Chauveau	519
5.	(Norway) Karoline Erdal	493

=== Individual ===
Rank	after all 3 races	Points
Red bib	(Russia) Evgeniya Burtasova	154
2.	(Norway) Marthe Kråkstad Johansen	109
3.	(Germany) Janina Hettich	98
4.	(Russia) Natalia Gerbulova	78
5.	(Russia) Victoria Slivko	72

=== Sprint ===
Rank	after all 12 races	Points
Red bib	(France) Caroline Colombo	364
2.	(Norway) Ragnhild Femsteinevik	355
3.	(France) Lou Jeanmonnot	352
4.	(France) Camille Bened	332
5.	(Sweden) Elisabeth Högberg	323

=== Pursuit ===
Rank	after all 4 races	Points
Red bib	(Russia) Evgeniya Burtasova	144
2.	(Norway) Jenny Enodd	139
3.	(France) Caroline Colombo	112
4.	(Norway) Ragnhild Femsteinevik	106
5.	(France) Sophie Chauveau	105

=== Mass start ===
Rank	after all 2 races	Points
Red bib	(Norway) Ragnhild Femsteinevik	92
2.	(Germany) Hanna Kebinger	89
3.	(France) Lou Jeanmonnot	78
4.	(Norway) Karoline Erdal	62
5.	(Germany) Marion Wiesensarter (Germany) Juliane Frühwirt	59

=== Super Sprint ===
Rank	after all 2 races	Points
Red bib	(France) Lou Jeanmonnot	82
2.	(Sweden) Emma Nilsson	66
3.	(Norway) Karoline Erdal	65
4.	(Norway) Ragnhild Femsteinevik (Italy) Linda Zingerle	60

=== Nations Cup ===
Rank	after all 23 races	Points
1.	France	7985
2.	Norway	7838
3.	Germany	7801
4.	Sweden	7075
5.	Italy	6815

== Mixed relay standings ==
Rank	after all 6 races	Points
1.	France	288
2.	Germany	285
3.	Norway	279
4.	Italy	245
5.	Sweden	239

== Podium table by nation ==
Table showing the IBU Cup podium places (gold–1st place, silver–2nd place, bronze–3rd place) by the countries represented by the athletes.

Rank	Nation	Gold	Silver	Bronze	Total
1	Norway	19	18	12	49
2	Russia	11	9	11	31
3	Germany	10	11	13	34
4	France	6	6	9	21
5	Italy	2	1	2	5
6	Sweden	1	3	1	5
7	Moldova	1	1	0	2
8	Belarus	1	0	0	1
9	Ukraine	0	1	2	3
10	Austria	0	1	0	1
11	Switzerland	0	0	2	2
Totals (11 entries)		51	51	52	154

== See also ==
- 2021–22 Biathlon World Cup
