= 2020–21 Biathlon World Cup – Pursuit Men =

The 2020–21 Biathlon World Cup – Pursuit Men started on 5 December 2020 in Kontiolahti and will finished on 20 March 2021 in Östersund

== Competition format ==
The 12.5 kilometres (7.8 mi) pursuit race is skied over five laps. The biathlete shoots four times at any shooting lane, in the order of prone, prone, standing, standing, totalling 20 targets. For each missed target a biathlete has to run a 150 metres (490 ft) penalty loop. Competitors' starts are staggered, according to the result of the previous sprint race.

== 2019–20 Top 3 standings ==
Medal	Athlete	Points
Gold:	(France) Émilien Jacquelin	232
Silver:	(France) Martin Fourcade	230
Bronze:	(France) Quentin Fillon Maillet	230

== Medal winners ==
Event	Gold	Time	Silver	Time	Bronze	Time
Kontiolahti (2) details	Sebastian Samuelsson; Sweden	32:26.7 (0+0+0+1)	Fabien Claude; France	32:42.5 (2+1+0+0)	Johannes Thingnes Bø; Norway	32:46.2 (0+0+1+2)
Hochfilzen details	Quentin Fillon Maillet; France	32:38.7 (0+0+0+0)	Émilien Jacquelin; France	33:04.2 (0+0+0+0)	Johannes Dale; Norway	33:28.2 (1+0+1+0)
Hochfilzen (2) details	Sturla Holm Lægreid; Norway	32:38.7 (0+0+1+0)	Émilien Jacquelin; France	31:23.4 (1+0+0+0)	Johannes Thingnes Bø; Norway	31:23.8 (0+0+1+0)
Oberhof details	Sturla Holm Lægreid; Norway	32:38.7 (0+1+0+1)	Johannes Dale; Norway	32:17.4 (0+0+0+2)	Tarjei Bø; Norway	32:27.2 (0+0+0+3)
World Championships details	Émilien Jacquelin; France	31:22.1 (0+0+0+0)	Sebastian Samuelsson; Sweden	31:29.4 (0+0+0+0)	Johannes Thingnes Bø; Norway	31:30.2 (0+1+1+0)
Nové Město details	Tarjei Bø; Norway	28:17.3 (1+0+0+0)	Johannes Thingnes Bø; Norway	28:25.5 (2+0+0+0)	Simon Desthieux; France	28:28.8 (0+2+0+0)
Nové Město (2) details	Quentin Fillon Maillet; France	28:46.7 (1+1+0+0)	Johannes Thingnes Bø; Norway	28:54.7 (1+0+0+1)	Émilien Jacquelin; France	29:01.2 (0+0+1+0)
Östersund details	Sturla Holm Lægreid; Norway	32:40.5 (1+0+1+0)	Johannes Thingnes Bø; Norway	33:03.1 (0+0+0+3)	Lukas Hofer; Italy	33:12.9 (1+0+2+1)

== Standings ==
6 of 8 competitions scored

#	Name	KON 2	HOC	HOC 2	OBH	POK	NME	NME 2	OST	Total
1	Sturla Holm Lægreid (NOR)	43	~~38~~	60	60	~~38~~	40	43	60	306
2	Johannes Thingnes Bø (NOR)	48	~~43~~	48	~~34~~	48	54	54	54	306
3	Émilien Jacquelin (FRA)	34	54	54	~~28~~	60	36	48	~~27~~	286
4	Quentin Fillon Maillet (FRA)	31	60	34	–	43	38	60	~~14~~	266
5	Sebastian Samuelsson (SWE)	60	31	~~24~~	36	54	29	~~21~~	43	253
6	Tarjei Bø (NOR)	~~29~~	36	36	48	~~27~~	60	38	31	249
7	Johannes Dale (NOR)	32	48	38	54	30	~~6~~	32	~~13~~	234
8	Fabien Claude (FRA)	54	40	27	43	29	0	25	~~24~~	218
9	Simon Desthieux (FRA)	~~26~~	~~5~~	30	32	40	48	29	32	211
10	Lukas Hofer (ITA)	25	~~24~~	~~15~~	40	26	30	40	48	209
11	Jakov Fak (SLO)	38	~~19~~	31	38	~~6~~	43	34	25	209
12	Martin Ponsiluoma (SWE)	27	23	40	29	28	~~7~~	~~22~~	38	185
13	Simon Eder (AUT)	28	34	32	~~16~~	32	~~4~~	26	30	182
14	Vetle Sjåstad Christiansen (NOR)	36	29	43	–	–	3	30	36	177
15	Benedikt Doll (GER)	40	30	28	22	~~10~~	34	17	~~5~~	171
16	Erik Lesser (GER)	22	25	~~21~~	30	–	26	27	40	170
17	Antonin Guigonnat (FRA)	12	32	25	~~4~~	20	20	36	0	145
18	Matvey Eliseev (RUS)	~~13~~	22	23	25	24	17	31	0	142
19	Alexander Loginov (RUS)	~~17~~	20	~~19~~	24	25	22	24	26	141
20	Arnd Peiffer (GER)	23	–	17	31	21	31	14	–	137
21	Eduard Latypov (RUS)	20	~~17~~	~~12~~	19	36	18	20	23	136
22	Michal Krčmář (CZE)	21	14	~~7~~	–	19	27	28	20	129
23	Benjamin Weger (SUI)	18	18	29	21	–	15	~~2~~	18	119
24	Dmytro Pidruchnyi (UKR)	3	–	20	DNS	13	32	18	28	114
25	Jesper Nelin (SWE)	0	26	26	10	12	23	8	0	105
26	Felix Leitner (AUT)	6	28	–	3	0	25	4	34	100
27	Evgeniy Garanichev (RUS)	–	27	16	0	–	0	9	29	81
28	Andrejs Rastorgujevs (LAT)	9	11	9	0	31	19	–	–	79
29	Christian Gow (CAN)	8	6	10	27	11	10	~~3~~	–	72
30	Anton Smolski (BLR)	5	12	8	15	7	0	0	22	69
#	Name	KON 2	HOC	HOC 2	OBH	POK	NME	NME 2	OST	Total
31	Sergey Bocharnikov (BLR)	2	0	14	26	0	24	0	0	66
32	Artem Pryma (UKR)	15	0	2	11	34	DNS	DNS	–	62
33	Dominik Windisch (ITA)	–	0	13	20	5	11	12	1	62
34	Thomas Bormolini (ITA)	–	16	5	17	22	0	0	0	60
35	Tero Seppälä (FIN)	4	15	0	0	9	8	16	7	59
36	Roman Rees (GER)	14	13	–	–	–	–	10	21	58
37	David Komatz (AUT)	0	7	11	18	17	–	–	0	53
38	Endre Strømsheim (NOR)	–	–	–	–	–	28	23	0	51
39	Scott Gow (CAN)	0	–	–	1	–	21	5	17	44
40	Miha Dovžan (SLO)	–	4	–	0	18	13	7	0	42
41	Aleksander Fjeld Andersen (NOR)	–	–	18	–	–	–	–	19	37
42	Vladimir Iliev (BUL)	11	–	–	14	3	9	–	0	37
43	Peppe Femling (SWE)	10	8	0	0	4	–	–	12	34
44	Philipp Horn (GER)	–	21	–	12	–	–	–	–	33
45	Bogdan Tsymbal (UKR)	–	–	–	–	23	–	–	8	31
46	Florent Claude (BEL)	0	–	–	0	15	0	–	16	31
47	Erlend Bjøntegaard (NOR)	30	DNS	–	–	–	–	–	–	30
48	Julian Eberhard (AUT)	24	DNS	3	–	–	–	–	–	27
49	Philipp Nawrath (GER)	–	–	–	–	–	12	–	15	27
50	Johannes Kühn (GER)	16	9	0	–	0	–	–	–	25
51	Sean Doherty (USA)	0	0	0	5	–	14	6	–	25
52	Said Karimulla Khalili (RUS)	–	–	–	–	–	5	19	–	24
53	Raman Yaliotnau (BLR)	–	0	0	23	–	–	–	–	23
54	Didier Bionaz (ITA)	–	0	22	0	0	1	0	–	23
55	Ondřej Moravec (CZE)	19	0	0	–	0	2	0	–	21
56	Tommaso Giacomel (ITA)	–	–	–	7	–	0	11	2	20
57	Jake Brown (USA)	0	–	–	–	16	–	0	3	19
58	Artem Tyshchenko (UKR)	–	–	–	–	–	16	–	0	16
59	Jakub Štvrtecký (CZE)	0	0	–	6	–	0	0	10	16
60	Mikuláš Karlík (CZE)	–	–	–	–	–	–	15	0	15
#	Name	KON 2	HOC	HOC 2	OBH	POK	NME	NME 2	OST	Total
61	Tuomas Harjula (FIN)	–	–	0	0	14	LAP	0	–	14
62	Anton Babikov (RUS)	0	10	4	–	0	–	–	–	14
63	Martin Jäger (SUI)	–	–	–	–	0	0	13	–	13
64	Jeremy Finello (SUI)	0	–	0	13	–	–	0	0	13
65	Justus Strelow (GER)	–	–	–	–	–	–	–	11	11
66	Anton Dudchenko (UKR)	–	0	6	–	–	–	–	4	10
67	Karol Dombrovski (LTU)	0	–	0	9	0	–	–	–	9
68	David Zobel (GER)	–	–	–	–	–	–	–	9	9
69	Leif Nordgren (USA)	–	–	1	0	8	0	–	–	9
70	Sivert Guttorm Bakken (NOR)	–	–	–	8	–	–	–	–	8
71	Maksim Varabei (BLR)	7	–	0	0	0	0	0	0	7
72	Filip Fjeld Andersen (NOR)	–	–	–	–	–	–	–	6	6
73	Olli Hiidensalo (FIN)	0	3	–	–	0	–	–	–	3
74	Emilien Claude (FRA)	–	–	–	2	–	–	0	–	2
75	Grzegorz Guzik (POL)	0	2	–	0	–	–	–	–	2
76	George Buta (ROU)	–	–	–	–	2	–	–	DNS	2
77	Anton Sinapov (BUL)	–	–	–	–	–	–	1	0	1
78	Rene Zahkna (EST)	–	–	–	–	1	0	–	–	1
79	Tomáš Krupčík (CZE)	1	–	–	–	–	–	–	–	1
79	Paul Schommer (USA)	–	1	–	–	–	–	–	–	1
