= Lesiuk =

Lesiuk, also spelled Lesyuk, is a surname. Notable people with the surname include:

- Artem Lesiuk (born 1996), Ukrainian judoka
- Taras Lesiuk (born 1996), Ukrainian biathlete
