= Ragnhild Femsteinevik =

Norwegian biathlete (born 1995)

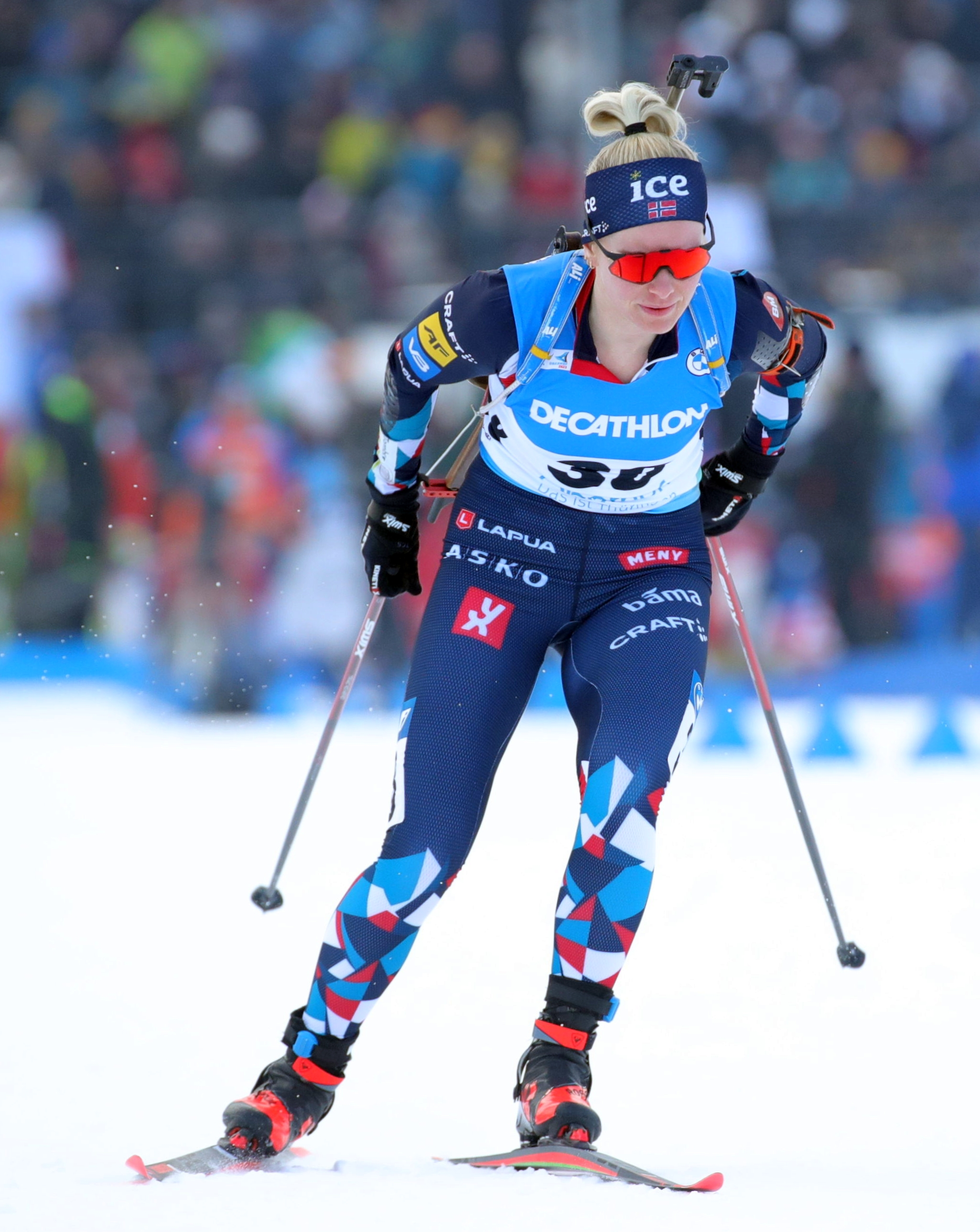
- Femsteinevik in 2023

Personal information
- Nationality: Norwegian
- Born: 27 August 1995 (age 30) Hatlestrand, Norway
- Years active: 2016-present
- Height: 176 cm (5 ft 9 in)

Sport
- Country: Norway
- Sport: Biathlon
- Coached by: Kjartan Halland

Professional information
- Club: Hålandsdal IL
- Skis: Fischer
- Rifle: Anschütz
- World Cup debut: November 30, 2016

World Championships
- Teams: 2 (2023, 2025)
- Medals: 2 (0 gold)

World Cup
- Seasons: 6
- Individual races: 39
- All races: 49
- Individual victories: 0
- All victories: 1
- Individual podiums: 0
- All podiums: 7
Medal record
Women's biathlon
Representing Norway
World Championships
Silver medal – second place	2025 Lenzerheide	4 × 6 km relay
Silver medal – second place	2025 Lenzerheide	Single mixed relay
- Updated on 9 March 2025

Ragnhild Femsteinevik (born 27 August 1995) is a Norwegian biathlete.

== Career ==
=== IBU Cup and First European Championship Medals ===
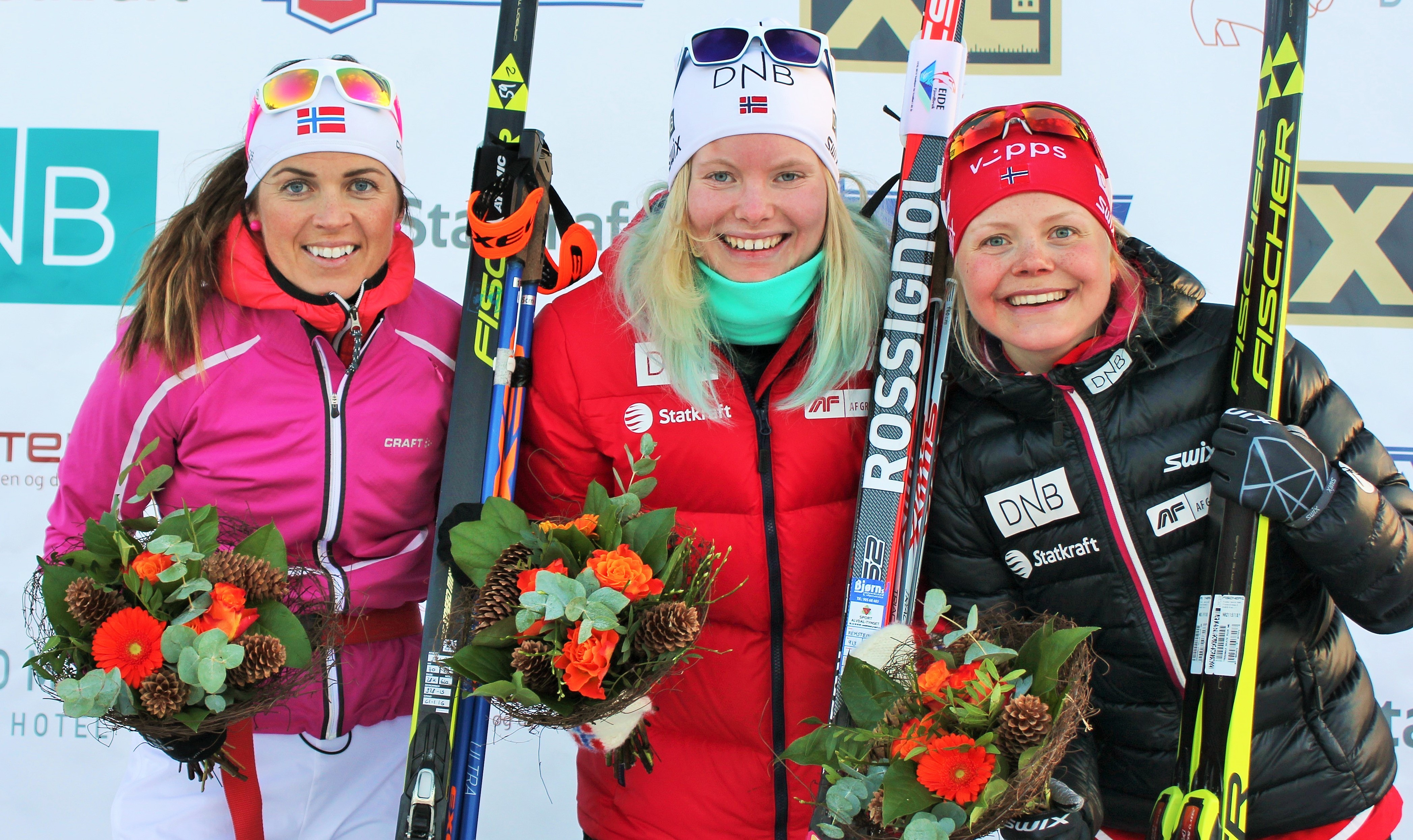
Jori Mørkve, Ragnhild Femsteinevik and Hilde Fenne at the Norwegian Championships 2016

Ragnhild Femsteinevik is a member of the Hålandsdal IL club. Her debut on the international stage occurred at the 2016 Junior World Championships in Cheile Grădiștei, Romania, where she secured the 27th position in the individual race. In the same year, she, alongside Hilde Fenne and Jori Mørkve, clinched the Norwegian championship title in the relay event. At the onset of the 2016/17 season, Femsteinevik finished fifth in the initial IBU Cup race, the sprint in Beitostølen, earning her an immediate nomination for the World Cup events in Östersund and on the Pokljuka. Following three races, some of which placed her well beyond the point-scoring range – notably the 103rd position in the sprint in Slovenia, second-to-last among the ranked athletes – Ragnhild only participated in races in the second-tier IBU Cup for the remainder of the season. After a year without international competitions, she returned to the IBU Cup in the winter of 2018/19. Achieving her inaugural podium finish with a third place in the sprint at Arber, she, along with Håvard Bogetveit, Johannes Dale, and Emilie Kalkenberg, secured another third place in the mixed relay race at Lenzerheide. Following a commendable ninth place in the individual race over 15 km at the European Championships in Minsk, Femsteinevik narrowly missed the medal positions in the single-mixed relay, as Endre Strømsheim had to complete three penalty laps after the final shooting. In the 2019/20 season, Femsteinevik refrained from participating in any international competitions; she returned to the starting line only at the 2021 European Championships but fell significantly short of the top ten in all races. However, for the remaining part of the season, she consistently achieved top-10 results in the IBU Cup, granting her the opportunity to compete in the World Cup during the last trimester. In Nové Město na Moravě, following a 47th-place finish in the sprint, she experienced her first pursuit race at the highest level.

=== European Championship Title and First World Cup Victory ===
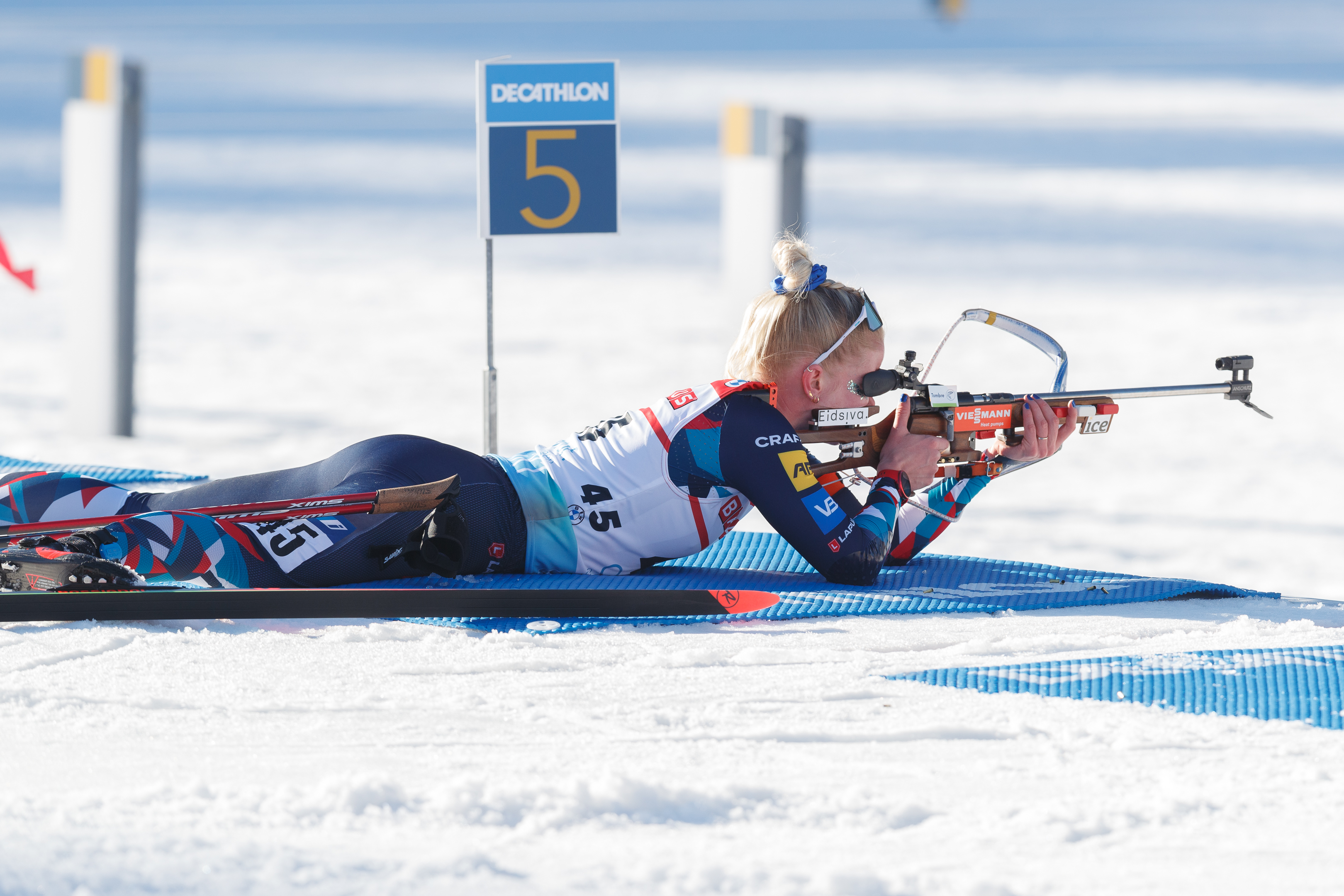
Femsteinevik at the 2023 World Championships in Oberhof

In December 2021, Femsteinevik celebrated her first victory in an IBU Cup race with the mass start in Sjusjøen. Following her win in the sprint in Osrblie the following January, she became part of the World Cup team in Ruhpolding and secured her first ranking points by finishing 34th in the sprint. The Norwegian had a significantly more successful performance at the European Championships, where Femsteinevik won the sprint and the mixed relay, crowning herself a double European champion. Throughout the season, she claimed another victory and two podium finishes. Despite finishing second in the overall IBU Cup standings with a 25-point gap behind Lou Jeanmonnot, she made a final appearance in the World Cup in Oslo, achieving a notable personal best of 15th place in the sprint despite two shooting misses.

For the 2022/23 winter season, Femsteinevik joined the Norwegian A-team and consistently competed in the World Cup. Her first podium finish in a relay came with Karoline Offigstad Knotten, Ida Lien, and Ingrid Landmark Tandrevold in Kontiolahti. After somewhat disappointing individual races, she finally achieved her personal best by finishing ninth in the mass start in Le Grand-Bornand in mid-December. The first relay victory followed alongside Knotten, Tandrevold, and Marte Olsbu Røiseland in Ruhpolding in mid-January 2023. Femsteinevik also participated in the World Championships in Oberhof, securing her best result with a 21st-place finish in the pursuit. At the end of the season, she ranked 34th in the overall World Cup standings. Due to a COVID-19 illness, Femsteinevik missed the first competitions of the 2023/24 winter season and exclusively competed in the IBU Cup during the first trimester, achieving only one top-10 result primarily due to shooting misses.

== Personal life ==
Ragnhild Femsteinevik from Hatlestrand in the municipality of Kvinnherad. Her brother, Martin Femsteinevik, is also a biathlete. Femsteinevik is known for competing in almost all races without gloves.

== Biathlon results ==
All results are sourced from the International Biathlon Union.

=== World Championships ===
2 medals (2 silver)

Event	Individual	Sprint	Pursuit	Mass start	Relay	Mixed relay	Single mixed relay
(Germany) 2023 Oberhof	55th	36th	21st	—	—	—	—
(Switzerland) 2025 Lenzerheide	12th	50th	45th	—	Silver	—	Silver

=== World Cup ===
Season	Age	Overall			Individual		Sprint		Pursuit		Mass start	
Season	Age	Races	Points	Position	Points	Position	Points	Position	Points	Position	Points	Position
2016–17	21	3/26	Did not earn World Cup points									
2020–21	25	4/26	Did not earn World Cup points									
2021–22	26	5/22	46	62nd	—	—	33	54th	13	64th	—	—
2022–23	27	16/20	157	34th	3	64th	54	37th	41	41st	59th	24th
2024–25	29	8/21	131	44th	44	23rd	38	48th	49	40th	—	—

==== Relay podiums ====
No.	Season	Date	Location	Level	Race	Placement	Teammate
1	2022–23	1 December 2022	(Finland) Kontiolahti	World Cup	Relay	3rd	Knotten, Lien, Tandrevold
2	2022–23	14 January 2023	(Germany) Ruhpolding	World Cup	Relay	1st	Knotten, Olsbu Røiseland, Tandrevold
3	2024–25	18 January 2025	(Germany) Ruhpolding	World Cup	Relay	2nd	Knotten, Arnekleiv, Kirkeeide
4	2024–25	26 January 2025	(Italy) Antholz-Anterselva	World Cup	Relay	2nd	Knotten, Kirkeeide, Tandrevold
5	2024–25	20 February 2025	(Switzerland) Lenzerheide	World Championships	Single Mixed Relay	2nd	J.T. Boe
6	2024–25	22 February 2025	(Switzerland) Lenzerheide	World Championships	Relay	2nd	Knotten, Tandrevold, Kirkeeide
7	2024–25	9 March 2025	(Czech Republic) Nové Město na Moravě	World Cup	Relay	2nd	Knotten, Tandrevold, Kirkeeide
