= 2021 IBU Open European Championships =

International biathlon competition

2021 European Championships
- Location: Duszniki-Zdrój, Poland
- Dates: 27–31 January

The 2021 Biathlon European Championships were held from 27 to 31 January 2021 in Duszniki-Zdrój, Poland. It was also a stage of the 2020–21 Biathlon IBU Cup.

== Schedule ==
All times are local (UTC+1).

Date	Time	Event
27 January	10:30	Women's 15 km individual
27 January	14:15	Men's 20 km individual
29 January	10:30	Women's 7.5 km sprint
29 January	14:00	Men's 10 km sprint
30 January	10:30	Women's 10 km pursuit
30 January	13:00	Men's 12.5 km pursuit
31 January	10:30	6 km W + 7.5 km M single mixed relay
31 January	13:00	2 × 6 km W + 2 × 6 km M mixed relay

== Results ==
=== Men's ===
Event	Gold		Silver		Bronze	
20 km individual details	Erlend Bjøntegaard; Norway	53:32.2 (0+2+0+0)	Endre Strømsheim; Norway	53:46.1 (0+0+1+1)	Said Karimulla Khalili; Russia	54:04.4 (0+0+0+0)
10 km sprint details	Martin Jäger; Switzerland	27:19.2 (0+0)	Said Karimulla Khalili; Russia	27:26.5 (0+0)	Johannes Kühn; Germany	27:34.5 (1+1)
12.5 km pursuit details	Artem Pryma; Ukraine	32:11.3 (1+0+1+1)	Michal Krčmář; Czech Republic	32:17.9 (0+0+0+1)	Håvard Gutubø Bogetveit; Norway	32:23.8 (0+0+1+2)

=== Women's ===
Event	Gold		Silver		Bronze	
15 km individual details	Monika Hojnisz-Staręga; Poland	45:17.1 (0+1+0+0)	Anastasiya Merkushyna; Ukraine	45:20.0 (0+0+0+0)	Larisa Kuklina; Russia	45:32.6 (0+0+1+0)
7.5 km sprint details	Baiba Bendika; Latvia	22:00.7 (0+1)	Karoline Erdal; Norway	22:06.4 (0+0)	Anastasia Shevchenko; Russia	22:10.4 (0+0)
10 km pursuit details	Kamila Żuk; Poland	29:12.7 (0+0+0+0)	Karoline Erdal; Norway	29:26.1 (1+0+1+1)	Åsne Skrede; Norway	29:28.9 (0+1+0+2)

=== Mixed ===
Event	Gold		Silver		Bronze	
6 km W + 7.5 km M single relay details	Germany; Stefanie Scherer; Justus Strelow; Stefanie Scherer; Justus Strelow	35:06.1 (0+1) (0+0) (0+1) (0+0) (0+2) (0+1) (0+0) (0+0)	France; Caroline Colombo; Emilien Claude; Caroline Colombo; Emilien Claude	35:22.6 (0+0) (0+1) (0+1) (0+1) (0+1) (1+3) (0+0) (0+1)	Russia; Larisa Kuklina; Evgeniy Garanichev; Larisa Kuklina; Evgeniy Garanichev	35:28.3 (0+0) (0+1) (0+1) (0+0) (0+2) (0+0) (0+0) (0+2)
4 × 6 km W+M relay details	Norway; Emilie Kalkenberg; Åsne Skrede; Erlend Bjøntegaard; Sivert Guttorm Bakken	1:01:23.7 (0+1) (1+3) (0+0) (0+1) (0+0) (0+2) (0+0) (0+0)	Germany; Vanessa Voigt; Marion Deigentesch; Dominic Schmuck; Philipp Nawrath	1:01:54.4 (0+1) (0+1) (0+0) (0+2) (0+0) (0+2) (0+1) (0+0)	Ukraine; Iryna Petrenko; Vita Semerenko; Bogdan Tsymbal; Artem Pryma	1:02:16.2 (0+1) (0+1) (0+2) (0+3) (0+1) (0+0) (0+1) (0+1)

== Medal table ==
* Host nation (Poland)

Rank	Nation	Gold	Silver	Bronze	Total
1	Latvia (LAT)	2	0	0	2
1	Poland (POL)*	2	0	0	2
3	Norway (NOR)	1	3	3	7
4	Germany (GER)	1	1	1	3
4	Ukraine (UKR)	1	1	1	3
6	Switzerland (SUI)	1	0	0	1
7	Russia (RUS)	0	1	3	4
8	Czech Republic (CZE)	0	1	0	1
8	France (FRA)	0	1	0	1
Totals (9 entries)		8	8	8	24

== Notes ==
1. When the 20 km individual race took place, Andrejs Rastorgujevs was placed first in the and awarded the gold medal. However in September 2021 Rastorgujevs was issued with a competition ban due to an anti-doping rule violation and had all of his results disqualified back dated to July 2020. The results were updated on the IBU website.
