= Taras Lesiuk =

Ukrainian biathlete (born 1996)

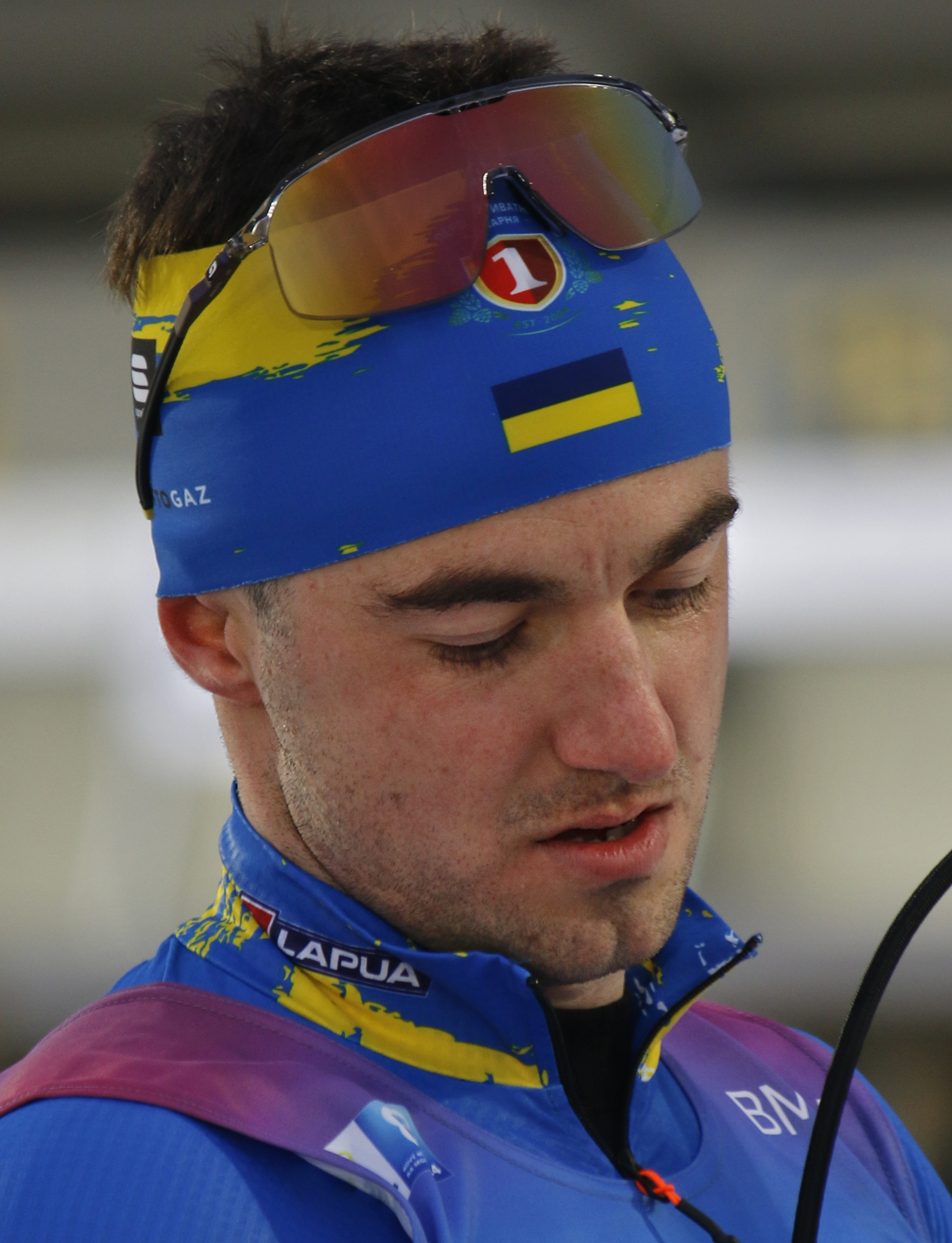
- Lesiuk in 2024

Personal information
- Nationality: Ukrainian
- Born: 21 August 1996 (age 29) Tekucha, Ivano-Frankivsk Oblast, Ukraine

Sport
- Country: Ukraine
- Sport: Biathlon

Taras Lesiuk (Ukrainian: Тарас Лесюк; born 21 August 1996) is a Ukrainian biathlete. He has been irregularly competing in the World Cup since 2019.

== Career ==
Taras Lesiuk competed in his first international competition in December 2013 at the age of 17, participating in an IBU Cup sprint in Obertilliach. After that, he didn't appear again until 2015, when he started racing at the junior level. In early 2017, Lesiuk stood on the podium for the first time in the IBU Junior Cup with the relay team. Later that year, he won silver in the relay and the pursuit race at the Junior events of the Summer Biathlon World Championships, marking his only victory at the junior level. From the 2017/18 season onwards, Lesiuk consistently competed in the IBU Cup and quickly achieved results within the top 30. Two top-15 finishes in January 2019 earned him his debut in the World Cup at the overseas races in Canmore and Soldier Hollow. In his first race, the sprint in Canmore, he immediately scored World Cup points by finishing 32nd. He also competed in the relay race the following day, finishing seventh despite a penalty loop.

Lesiuk achieved his first top-10 placements in the IBU Cup at the end of the 2019/20 season. The following winter, he reached the podium for the first time with the relay team at Arber and improved his individual result in Obertilliach to fifth place. In the 2021/22 season, Lesiuk was initially part of the World Cup lineup again and achieved his first pursuit race at the highest level at the competitions in Le Grand-Bornand. Additionally, he finished sixth in the individual race at the European Championships 2022. At the beginning of the 2022/23 winter season, Lesiuk scored points in the individual, sprint, and pursuit races in Kontiolahti, each finishing exactly 40th three times in a row. His best season result in the World Cup was 29th place in the individual race in Ruhpolding, but he was reassigned to the IBU Cup for the European Championships, where he could achieve a tenth place in the sprint at the end of the winter.

== Biathlon results ==
All results are sourced from the International Biathlon Union.

=== Olympic Games ===
0 medals

Event	Individual	Sprint	Pursuit	Mass start	Relay	Mixed relay
(Italy) 2026 Milano Cortina	65th	—	—	—	16th	—

=== World Championships ===
0 medals

Event	Individual	Sprint	Pursuit	Mass start	Relay	Mixed relay	Single mixed relay
(Czech Republic) 2024 Nové Město	72nd	67th	—	—	—	—	—
(Switzerland) 2025 Lenzerheide	—	65th	—	—	8th	—	—

=== World Cup ===
Season	Overall			Individual		Sprint		Pursuit		Mass start	
Season	Races	Points	Position	Points	Position	Points	Position	Points	Position	Points	Position
2018–19	2/25	9	93rd	9	61st	—	—	—	—	—	—
2019–20	1/21	Didn't earn World Cup points									
2020–21	2/26	Didn't earn World Cup points									
2021–22	5/22	Didn't earn World Cup points									
2022–23	8/21	15	78th	13	50th	1	84th	1	75th	—	—
2023–24	11/21	8	80th	8	56th	—	—	—	—	—	—
2024–25	7/21	11	74th	—	—	7	71st	4	69th	—	—

=== European Championships ===
0 medals

Year	Individual	Sprint	Pursuit	Relay	Mixed Relay
(Italy) 2018 Ridnaun	48th	—	—	—N/a	—
(Belarus) 2019 Minsk	DNS	90th	—	—N/a	—
(Poland) 2021 Duszniki Zdroj	57th	73rd	—	—N/a	—
(Germany) 2022 Arber	6th	56th	22nd	—N/a	8th
(Switzerland) 2023 Lenzerheide	47th	24th	34th	—N/a	—
(Slovakia) 2024 Brezno-Osrblie	58th	53rd	39th	—N/a	—
(Italy) 2025 Val Martello	—	—	—	8th	—N/a

=== IBU Cup ===
==== Relay podiums ====
Season	Place	Competition	Placement
2020–21	Arber, Germany	Relay	2
