= Filip Fjeld Andersen =

Norwegian biathlete

Personal information
- Nationality: Norwegian
- Born: 4 July 1999 (age 26) Nesodden, Norway

Sport
- Country: Norway
- Sport: Biathlon
Medal record
World Cup
| Gold medal – first place | 2021 Kontiolahti | 4 × 7.5 km Relay |
| Silver medal – second place | 2021 Kontiolahti | Sprint |
| Bronze medal – third place | 2021 Annecy | Sprint |
IBU Cup
| Gold medal – first place | 2020 Arber | Sprint |
| Gold medal – first place | 2020 Arber | Sprint |
| Gold medal – first place | 2020 Obertilliach | Sprint |
| Gold medal – first place | 2021 Sjusjoen | Super Sprint |
| Silver medal – second place | 2020 Arber | Sprint |
| Silver medal – second place | 2021 Sjusjoen | Sprint |
| Silver medal – second place | 2020 Obertilliach | 4 × 7.5 km Mixed Relay |
| Bronze medal – third place | 2020 Arber | 4 × 7.5 km Mixed Relay |
Youth World Championships
| Silver medal – second place | 2018 Otepää | Individual |
| Bronze medal – third place | 2019 Osrblie | Sprint |

Filip Fjeld Andersen (born 4 July 1999) is a Norwegian biathlete. He has competed in the Biathlon World Cup since 2022.
He is the younger brother of former Norwegian biathlete Aleksander Fjeld Andersen.

== Biography ==
=== Early life ===
Andersen started skiing at the age of one and a half years old, and started biathlon at the age of 12. Less than a year after starting biathlon, he finished second among 1000 youths competing in Norway.

=== 2018-2020: Youth and Junior world championships ===
After the 2018 IBU Youth World Championships, where he came second in the Individual race, he was diagnosed with atrial fibrillation. Following the diagnosis, he underwent three surgeries, the last of which was in May 2021.

=== 2021: IBU Cup Total Score, Spring globes, World Cup debut ===
He returned to the IBU Cup on 14 January 2021, and was placed 2nd in his first competition as a senior - The Men's 10 km Spring in Arber. He won his first senior competition on 16 January 2021 by winning the second 10 km Sprint in Arber. He finished the season by winning the Overall, U25 and Sprint Globe for the 2020–21 Biathlon IBU Cup season. By winning the total score, he earned a spot in the 2020-21 Biathlon World Cup final in Ostersund, where he finished 58th in the Sprint and 35th in the Pursuit.

=== 2021-22 season: First World Cup podium ===
In the 2021-22 Biathlon World Cup, he competed as part of the Norwegian A-team in the season opening in Ostersund, where he was ranked 9th in the 10 km sprint competition. He then participated in 2021-22 Biathlon IBU Cup competitions in Sjusjøen and won 2 gold medals and a silver medal. He returned to the World Cup and had his first World Cup podium place in Annecy, where he came third in the 10 km sprint competition. He continued as part of the A-team for the rest of the season, winning gold in the Men's relay and bronze in the sprint in Kontiolahti. He has been called "the new prodigy of Norwegian biathlon".

=== 2022-23 season ===
On 31 March 2022, it was announced that Andersen would be competing as part of the Elite Norwegian team in the 2022–23 season.

Andersen started the 2022–23 Biathlon World Cup season in the Elite team, and ranked 6th in the first 10 km sprint competition of the season in Kontiolahti. On the following week, in Hochfilzen, he placed 4th in the Sprint, 1st in the Men's relay and 20th in the pursuit.

== Biathlon results ==
All results are sourced from the International Biathlon Union.

=== World Cup ===
| Season | Overall | | Individual | | Sprint | | Pursuit | | Mass start | |
| Season | Points | Position | Points | Position | Points | Position | Points | Position | Points | Position |
|---|---|---|---|---|---|---|---|---|---|---|
| 2021–22 | 403 | 21st | 10 | 48th | 218 | 9th | 101 | 27th | 74 | 23rd |
| 2022–23 | 324 | 25th | 18 | 44th | 142 | 18th | 128 | 21st | 38 | 31st |

† – season in progress

==== Individual podiums ====
- 2 podiums

| No. | Season | Date | Location | Race | Level | Place |
|---|---|---|---|---|---|---|
| 1 | 2021–22 | 17 December 2021 | (France) Annecy | Sprint | World Cup | 3rd |
| 2 | 2021–22 | 5 March 2022 | (Finland) Kontiolahti | Sprint | World Cup | 2nd |
