= Emilie Kalkenberg =

Norwegian biathlete (born 1997)

Emilie Ågheim Kalkenberg
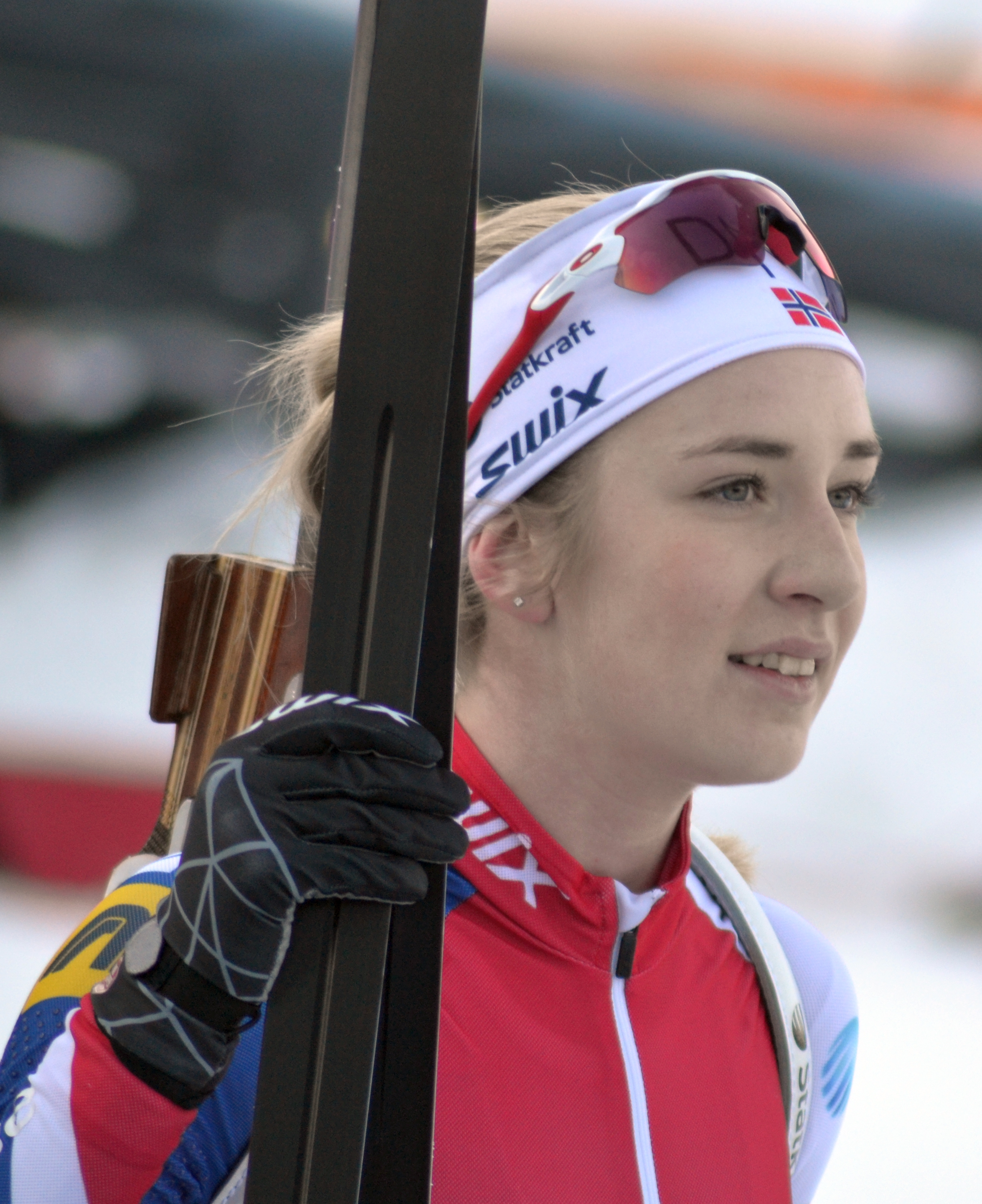
- Kalkenberg in 2017

Personal information
- Nationality: Norwegian
- Born: July 6, 1997 (age 28) Mo i Rana, Norway

Sport
- Country: Norway
- Sport: Biathlon
Medal record
Women's biathlon
Representing Norway
European Championships
Gold medal – first place	2021 Duszniki-Zdrój	Mixed relay
Silver medal – second place	2024 Osrblie	10 km pursuit
Silver medal – second place	2024 Osrblie	Single mixed relay
Bronze medal – third place	2018 Ridnaun	Mixed relay
Junior World Championships
Silver medal – second place	2018 Otepää	3 × 6 km relay
Youth World Championships
Silver medal – second place	2016 Cheile Grădiştei	6 km sprint
Bronze medal – third place	2016 Cheile Grădiştei	3 × 6 km relay

Emilie Ågheim Kalkenberg (born 6 July 1997) is a Norwegian biathlete who represents the Skonseng youth team.

At the 2018 IBU Open European Championships, Kalkenberg won bronze in the mixed relay together with Kaia Wøien Nicolaisen, Håvard Bogetveit and Fredrik Gjesbakk.

She made her World Cup debut in the 2017–18 season, finishing 69th in Oberhof. After several lowly performances, she broke the top 20 with a 20th place in Canmore in the 2018–19 season, also recording a 2nd place in the Canmore relay. In the 2019–20 season, her best finishes were 26th and 15th in Kontiolahti.

She hails from Skonseng. When she was a child, Kalkenberg suffered from myalgic encephalomyelitis for two years, being diagnosed at Rikshospitalet. Her parents credit Live Landmark's "Lightning Process" for Kalkenberg's recovery.

== Career results ==
=== Olympic Games ===
0 medals

Event	Individual	Sprint	Pursuit	Mass start	Relay	Mixed relay
(China) 2022 Beijing	38th	—	—	—	—	—
