= Caroline Colombo =

French biathlete (born 1996)

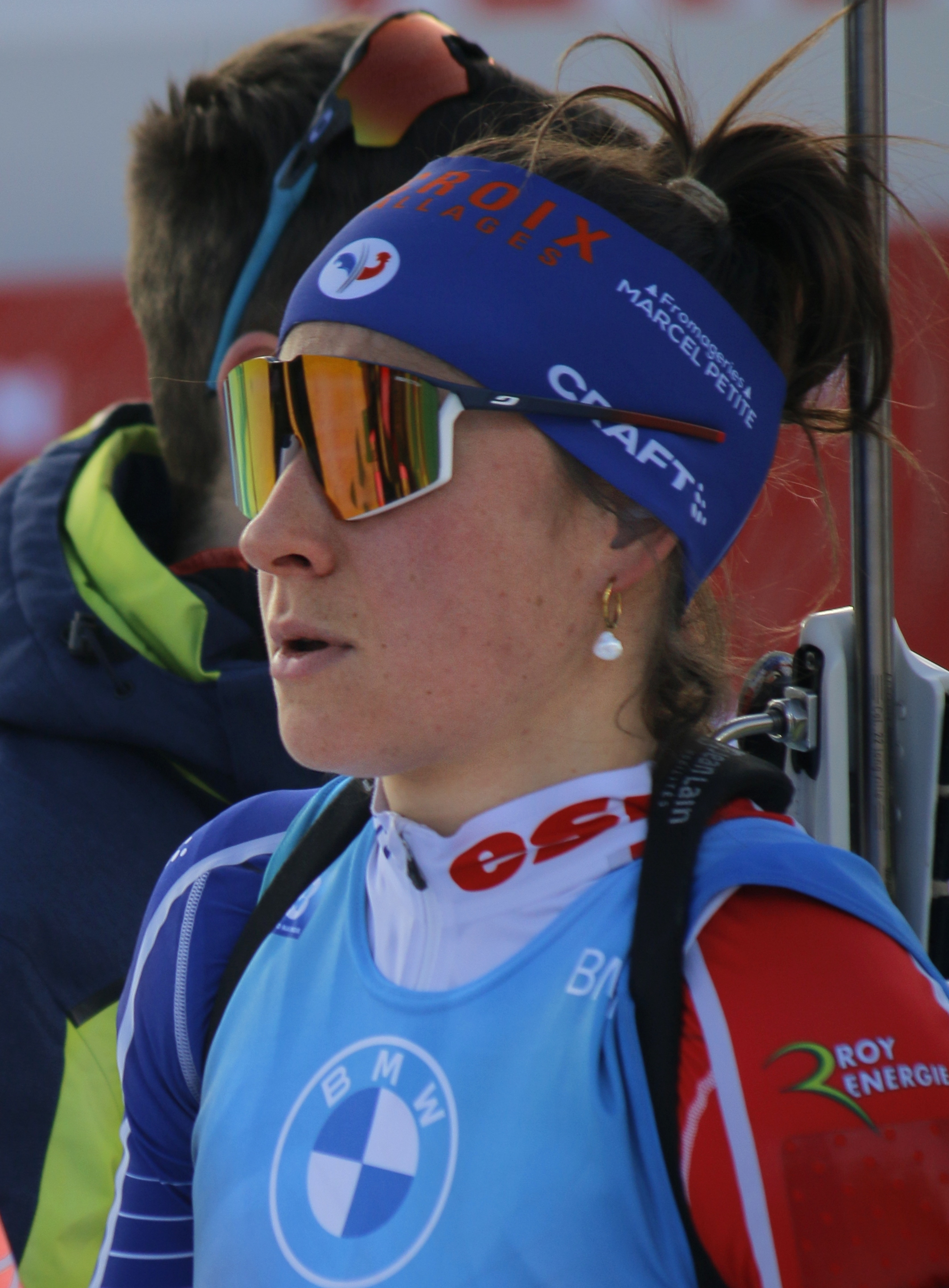
Colombo in 2023

Caroline Colombo (born 16 April 1996) is a French retired biathlete who competed internationally from 2015 to 2025.

== Early life ==
Colombo, born in Pontarlier, France, was a member of the A.S. Mouthe club and trained at the Lycée Xavier-Marmier in Pontarlier.

== Career ==
Colombo began her international career in December 2015, participating in the IBU Junior Cup. She secured her first victory in this competition a year later in Lenzerheide. In July 2017, she suffered a severe injury during a roller ski training session in Font-Romeu, resulting in an open fracture and dislocation of her ankle. Despite medical opinions suggesting a potential end to her career, she underwent a lengthy rehabilitation and returned to competition a year later. She transitioned to senior-level competitions, achieving her first IBU Cup victory in December 2018 in Obertilliach in the individual event. In the 2021–22 IBU Cup season, Colombo won the sprint discipline title and finished 8th overall.

Colombo made her World Cup debut in January 2019 in Oberhof. Throughout her career, she participated in 58 World Cup events, with her most notable individual performance being a 5th place finish in the mass start at Östersund in 2023. She achieved her sole World Cup victory in a mixed relay event in Nové Město in March 2023.

In the 2021 European Biathlon Championships held in Duszniki-Zdrój, Colombo won a silver medal in the single mixed relay event.

== Health challenges and retirement ==
In November 2023, Colombo was diagnosed with neuropathy, a condition causing chronic pain and fatigue, which significantly impacted her performance. After struggling with the condition for over a year, she announced her retirement from professional biathlon on 5 February 2025 at the age of 28.

== Honours ==
- IBU Cup: sprint discipline title (2021–22 season)
- European Biathlon Championships: silver medal - single mixed relay (Duszniki-Zdrój, 2021)
- Biathlon World Cup: 1 victory - mixed relay (Nové Město, 2023)
