= Said Karimulla Khalili =

Russian biathlete

Personal information
- Nationality: (Russia) Russian
- Born: 2 September 1998 (age 27) Sergiyev Posad Sergiyevo-Posadsky District, Moscow Oblast, Russia.
- Height: 1.80 m (5 ft 11 in)
- Weight: 76 kg (168 lb)

Sport

Professional information
- Sport: Biathlon
- Club: Moscow
- World Cup debut: 10 January 2020

Olympic Games
- Teams: 1 (2022)
- Medals: 1

World Championships
- Teams: 1 (2021)
- Medals: 1 (0 gold)

World Cup
- Seasons: 2 (2019/20–)
- Individual victories: 0
- All victories: 0
- Individual podiums: 0
- All podiums: 1
- Overall titles: 0
- Discipline titles: 0
Medal record
Men's biathlon
Representing ROC
Olympic Games
Bronze medal – third place	2022 Beijing	4 × 7.5 km relay
Representing Russian Biathlon Union
World Championships
Bronze medal – third place	2021 Pokljuka	4 × 7.5 km relay
Representing Russia
European Championships
Silver medal – second place	2020 Raubichi	Mixed relay
Silver medal – second place	2021 Duszniki-Zdrój	10 km sprint
Bronze medal – third place	2021 Duszniki-Zdrój	20 km individual
Youth Olympic Games
Bronze medal – third place	2016 Lillehammer	Boys' pursuit
Junior World Championships
Gold medal – first place	2018 Otepää	4 × 7.5 km relay
Gold medal – first place	2019 Osrblie	4 × 7.5 km relay
Gold medal – first place	2020 Lenzerheide	4 × 7.5 km relay
Silver medal – second place	2018 Otepää	15 km individual
Silver medal – second place	2019 Osrblie	10 km sprint
Silver medal – second place	2020 Lenzerheide	12.5 km pursuit
Youth World Championships
Silver medal – second place	2017 Osrblie	12.5 km individual
Silver medal – second place	2017 Osrblie	3 × 7.5 km relay

Said Karimulla Khalili (Russian: Саид Каримулла Халили; Pashto: کریم الله خلیلي وویل; born 2 September 1998) is a Russian-Afghan biathlete.

He competed at the Biathlon World Championships 2021, winning a bronze medal in the relay event.

== Biathlon results ==
=== Olympic Games ===
1 medal (1 bronze)

Event	Individual	Sprint	Pursuit	Mass start	Relay	Mixed relay
Representing ROC Russian Olympic Committee
(China) 2022 Beijing	34th	―	―	―	Bronze	―

=== World Championships ===
1 medal (1 bronze)

Event	Individual	Sprint	Pursuit	Mass start	Relay	Mixed relay	Single mixed relay
Representing Russian Biathlon Union
(Slovenia) 2021 Pokljuka	6th	64th	—	20th	Bronze	—	—
