= Martin Jäger =

Swiss biathlete (born 1987)

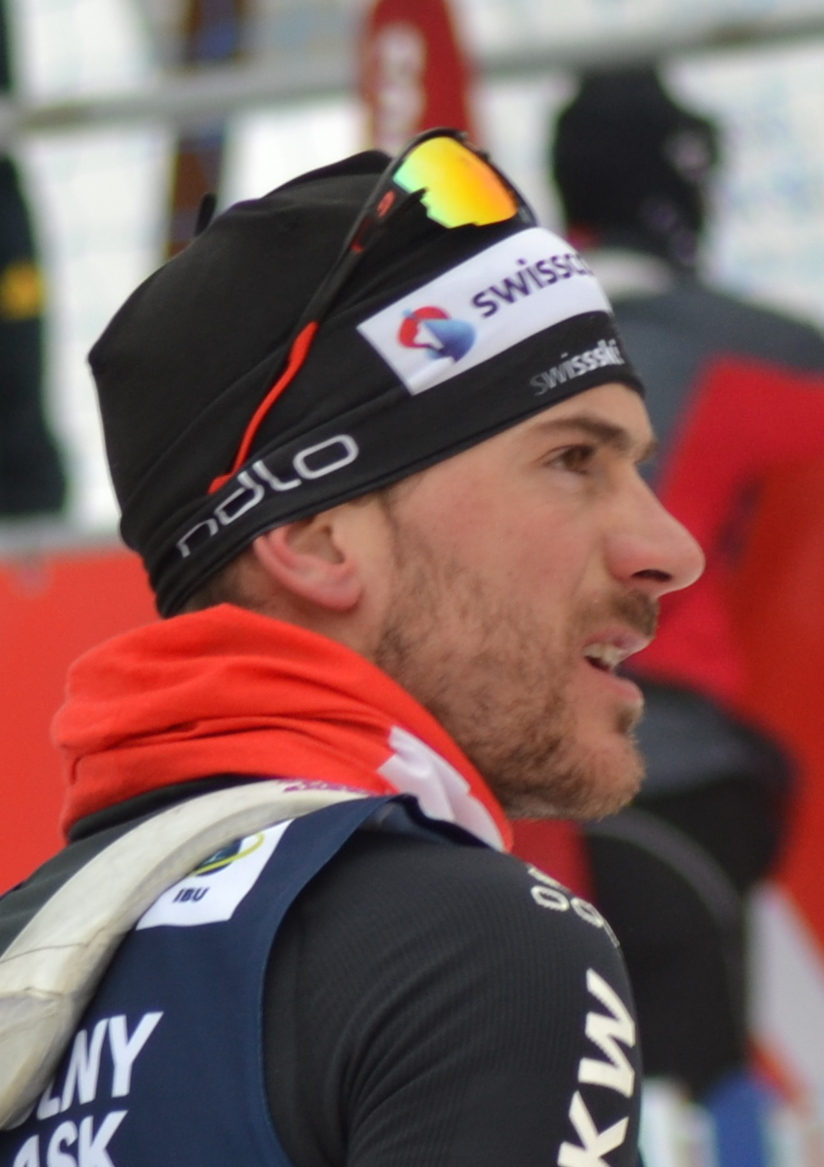
- Martin Jäger in 2017

Personal information
- Nationality: Swiss
- Born: 20 December 1987 (age 38) Walenstadt, Switzerland

Sport
- Country: Switzerland
- Sport: Cross-country skiing Biathlon
Medal record
Men's biathlon
Representing Switzerland
European Championships
Gold medal – first place	2021 Duszniki-Zdrój	10 km sprint
Bronze medal – third place	2022 Arber	Mixed relay
Men's cross-country skiing
Junior World Championships
Silver medal – second place	2010 Hinterzarten	Individual sprint

Martin Jäger (born 20 December 1987) is a Swiss biathlete. He was born in Walenstadt. He has competed in the Biathlon World Cup, and represented Switzerland at the Biathlon World Championships 2016.

== Biathlon results ==
All results are sourced from the International Biathlon Union.

=== World Championships ===
0 medals

Event	Individual	Sprint	Pursuit	Mass start	Relay	Mixed relay	Single Mixed relay
(Norway) 2016 Oslo	—	48th	55th	—	—	—	—
(Sweden) 2019 Östersund	73rd	45th	46th	—	—	—	—
(Slovenia) 2021 Pokljuka	74th	43rd	42nd	—	—	—	—

*During Olympic seasons competitions are only held for those events not included in the Olympic program.
