= Aleksander Fjeld Andersen =

Norwegian biathlete

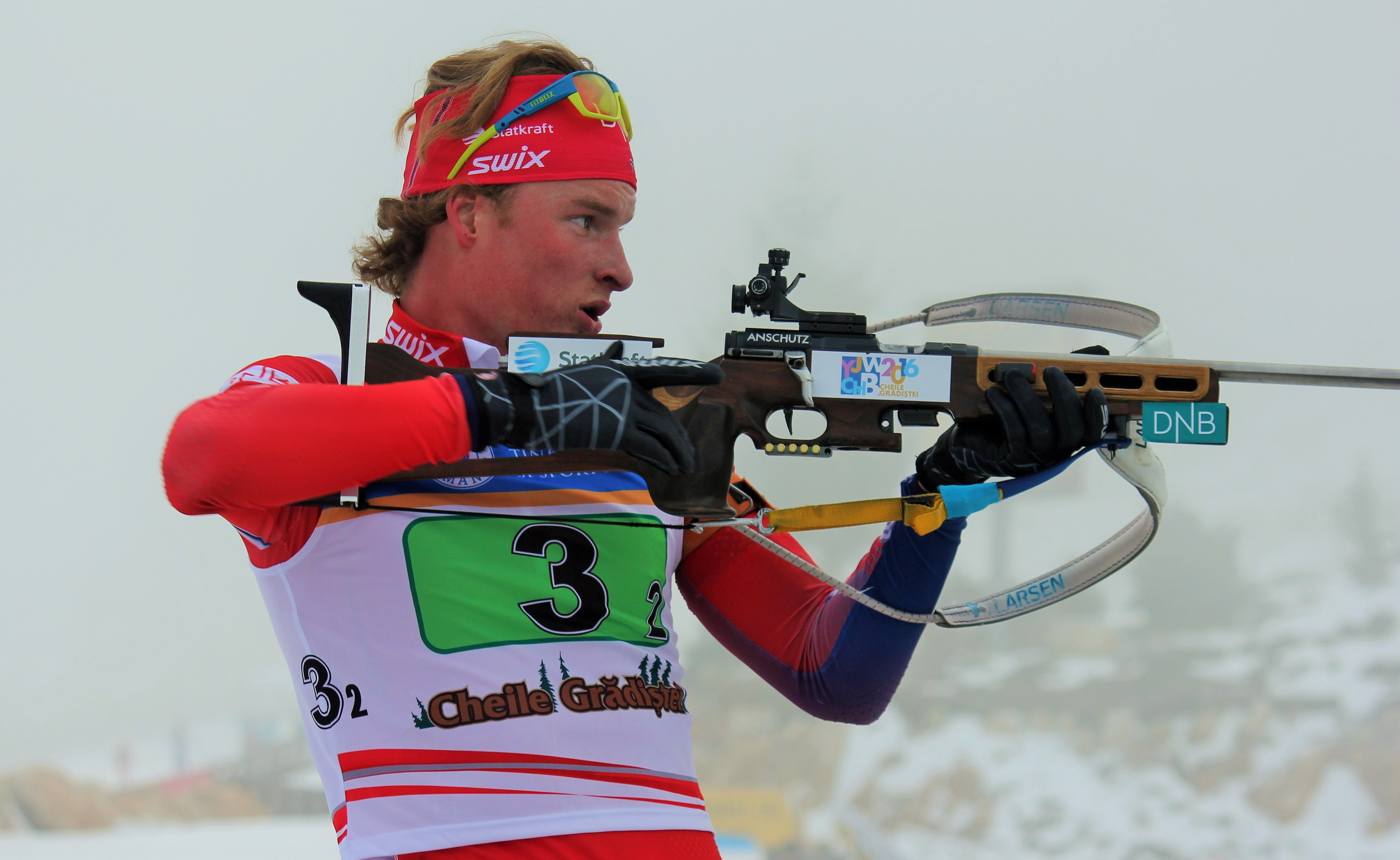
- Andersen in 2016

Personal information
- Nationality: Norwegian
- Born: 15 April 1997 (age 29) Nesodden, Norway

Sport
- Country: Norway
- Sport: Biathlon
Medal record
Junior World Championships
Silver medal – second place	2017 Osrblie	4 × 7.5 km relay
Youth World Championships
Gold medal – first place	2016 Cheile Grădiştei	3 × 7.5 km relay
Silver medal – second place	2016 Cheile Grădiştei	12.5 km individual

Aleksander Fjeld Andersen (born 15 April 1997) is a former Norwegian biathlete. He competed in the Biathlon World Cup since 2021. He is the older brother of fellow Norwegian biathlete Filip Fjeld Andersen. He retired in May 2023.
