= Bogdan Tsymbal =

Ukrainian biathlete (born 1997)

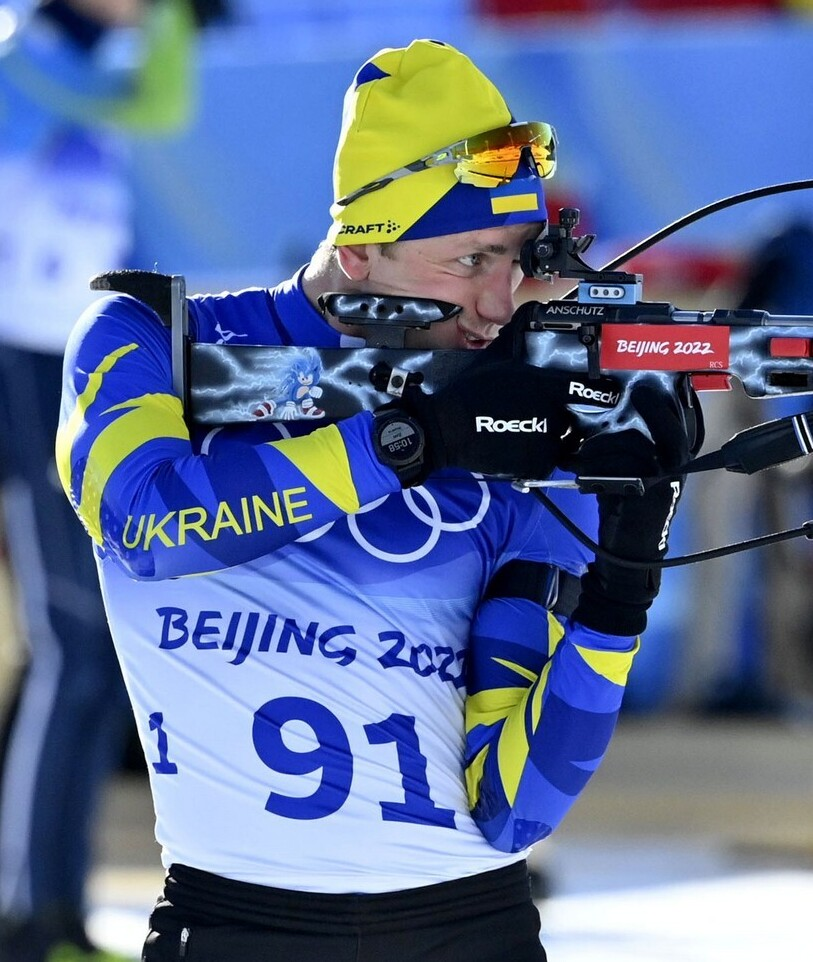
- Tsymbal at the 2022 Winter Olympics

Personal information
- Full name: Богдан Віталійович Цимбал; Bogdan Vitaliyovych Tsymbal
- Nationality: Ukrainian
- Born: 8 August 1997 (age 28) Sumy, Ukraine

Sport
- Sport: Biathlon
Medal record
Men's biathlon
Representing Ukraine
European Championships
Bronze medal – third place	2021 Duszniki-Zdrój	Mixed relay
- Updated on March 28, 2021

Bogdan Tsymbal (born 8 August 1997) is a Ukrainian biathlete.

== Career results ==
=== Olympic Games ===
Event	Individual	Sprint	Pursuit	Mass start	Relay	Mixed relay
(China) 2022 Beijing	55th	66th	-	-	9th	-

=== World Championships ===
Event	Individual	Sprint	Pursuit	Mass start	Relay	Mixed relay	Single mixed relay
(Italy) 2020 Antholz	—	67th	—	—	—	—	—
(Slovenia) 2021 Pokljuka	—	29th	17th	—	5th	—	—
(Germany) 2023 Oberhof	39th	29th	40th	—	13th	—	—

==== Rankings ====
Season	Individual	Sprint	Pursuit	Mass start	Overall Position
2020–21	—	65	43	—	57
