= Erlend Bjøntegaard =

Norwegian biathlete (born 1990)

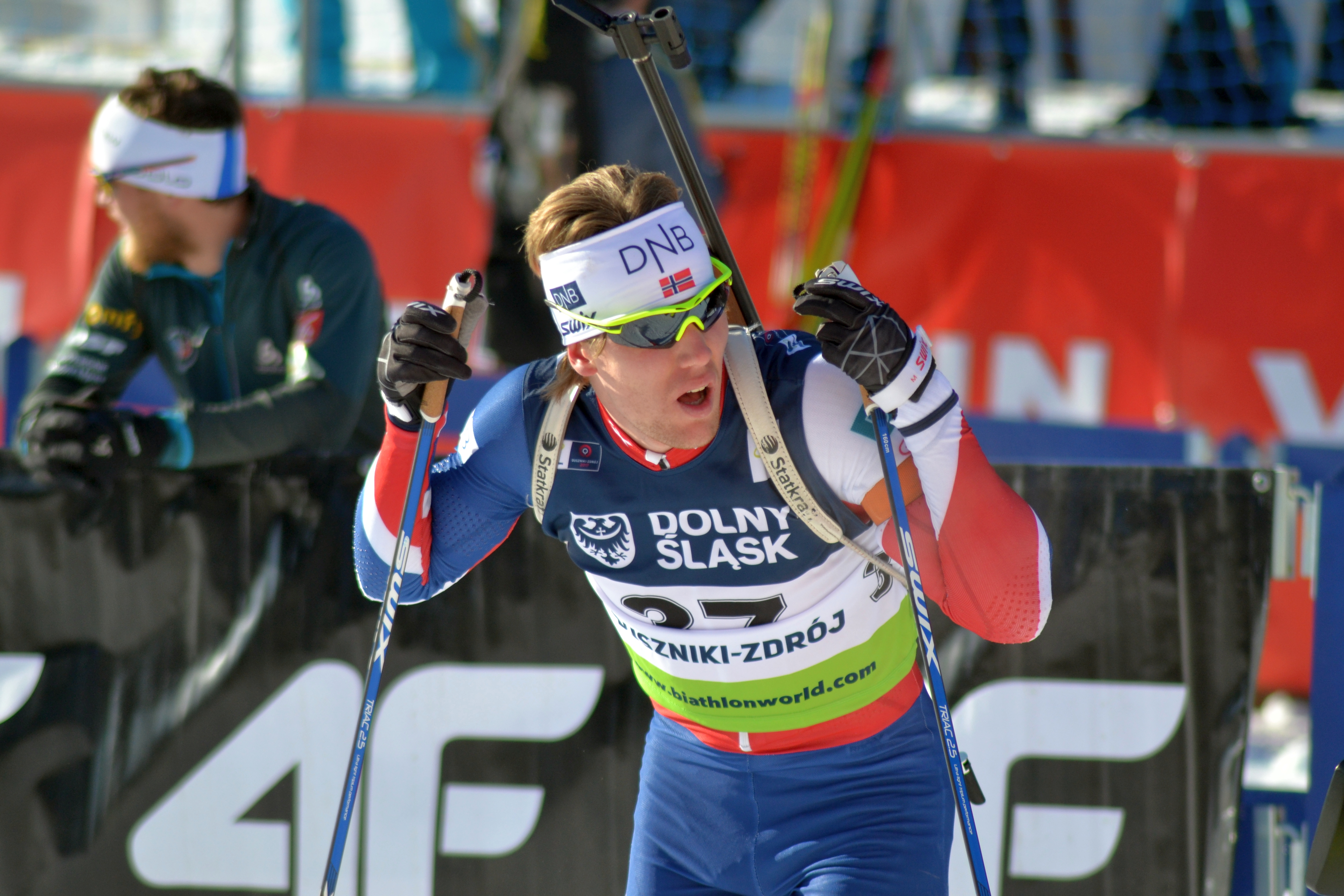
- Bjøntegaard in 2015

Personal information
- Nationality: Norwegian
- Born: 30 July 1990 (age 35) Kongsberg

Sport
- Country: Norway
- Sport: Biathlon
Medal record
Men's biathlon
Representing Norway
European Championships
Gold medal – first place	2021 Duszniki-Zdrój	Mixed relay
Gold medal – first place	2021 Duszniki-Zdrój	20 km individual
Gold medal – first place	2022 Arber	10 km sprint
Gold medal – first place	2022 Arber	Mixed relay
Gold medal – first place	2023 Lenzerheide	10 km sprint
Gold medal – first place	2023 Lenzerheide	Mixed relay
Silver medal – second place	2014 Nové Město	4 x 7.5 km relay
Silver medal – second place	2017 Duszniki-Zdrój	Mixed relay
Silver medal – second place	2023 Lenzerheide	12.5 km pursuit
Junior World Championships
Bronze medal – third place	2011 Nové Město	4 × 7.5 km relay
Youth World Championships
Gold medal – first place	2009 Canmore	10 km pursuit
Silver medal – second place	2008 Ruhpolding	3 × 7.5 km relay
Silver medal – second place	2009 Canmore	7.5 km sprint

Erlend Øvereng Bjøntegaard (born 30 July 1990) is a retired Norwegian biathlete. He has competed in the Biathlon World Cup, and represented Norway at the Biathlon World Championships 2016. Bjøntegaard represents the club IL Bevern in a remote part of Kongsberg. He retired at the end of the 2022/23 season.

== Biathlon results ==
All results are sourced from the International Biathlon Union.

=== Olympic Games ===
0 medals

Event	Individual	Sprint	Pursuit	Mass start	Relay	Mixed relay
(South Korea) 2018 Pyeongchang	—	5th	9th	7th	—	—

*The mixed relay was added as an event in 2014.

=== World Championships ===
0 medals

Event	Individual	Sprint	Pursuit	Mass start	Relay	Mixed relay	Single mixed relay
(Norway) 2016 Oslo Holmenkollen	—	69th	—	—	—	—	—N/a
(Sweden) 2019 Östersund	—	7th	15th	22nd	—	—	—
(Italy) 2020 Antholz	—	35th	15th	—	—	—	—

*During Olympic seasons competitions are only held for those events not included in the Olympic program.
**The single mixed relay was added as an event in 2019.
