= 2020–21 Biathlon World Cup – Nation Men =

The Nation's Cup Score Men in the 2019–20 Biathlon World Cup is led by Norway, who is the defending titlist. Each nation's score comprises the points earned by its three best placed athletes in every Sprint and Individual competition, the points earned in the Men's Relay competitions, and half of the points earned in the Mixed Relay competitions.

For this season only the best 19 results out of 25 will be counted towards the standings.

== 2019–20 Top 3 standings ==
Medal	Nation	Points
Gold:	Norway	8192
Silver:	France	7885
Bronze:	Germany	7211

== Standings ==
#	Nation	KON IN	KON SP	KON2 SP	KON2 RL	HOC SP	HOC RL	HOC2 SP	OBE SP	OBE MR	OBE SR	OBE2 SP	OBE RL	ANT IN	ANT RL	POK MR	POK SP	POK IN	POK SR	POK RL	NOV RL	NOV SP	NOV2 SP	NOV2 MR	NOV2 SR	ÖST SP	Total
1	Norway	443	431	448	420	439	390	462	462	~~195~~	~~180~~	454	390	422	390	~~210~~	419	448	~~195~~	420	360	413	428	~~210~~	~~195~~	422	8061
2	France	409	396	379	250	440	290	399	397	~~180~~	~~210~~	376	420	387	420	~~155~~	440	384	~~210~~	330	310	430	441	~~165~~	~~145~~	400	7298
3	Germany	385	390	413	360	389	360	332	360	~~155~~	~~165~~	421	310	378	330	~~135~~	303	419	~~135~~	270	420	413	376	~~115~~	~~105~~	349	6978
4	Russia	350	377	310	330	353	330	363	377	~~210~~	~~115~~	377	330	378	360	~~115~~	368	373	~~105~~	360	390	374	365	~~135~~	~~155~~	368	6833
5	Sweden	337	415	370	390	388	420	394	374	~~95~~	~~195~~	373	270	318	170	~~180~~	417	348	~~180~~	390	210	384	381	~~180~~	210	386	6775
6	Italy	290	252	279	310	288	250	315	368	~~135~~	~~135~~	363	360	353	310	~~145~~	362	299	~~155~~	290	270	312	363	~~195~~	~~80~~	369	6003
7	Austria	340	327	328	290	376	270	367	348	~~105~~	~~125~~	331	170	375	290	195	317	370	~~145~~	220	290	297	292	~~125~~	~~165~~	355	5978
8	Ukraine	281	242	303	220	273	190	361	271	~~110~~	~~90~~	321	290	365	250	~~165~~	350	324	~~165~~	310	230	329	253	~~155~~	~~110~~	291	5454
9	Belarus	321	329	356	210	290	210	336	366	~~165~~	~~155~~	267	160	306	190	~~90~~	334	310	~~100~~	230	250	305	318	~~110~~	~~125~~	327	5420
10	Slovenia	296	306	323	200	321	200	315	280	~~75~~	~~95~~	269	210	306	220	~~80~~	312	337	~~95~~	250	330	317	321	~~45~~	—	278	5391
11	Czech Republic	366	337	318	270	313	310	315	261	~~90~~	—	170	140	316	130	~~105~~	289	359	~~80~~	190	220	292	348	~~105~~	~~75~~	335	5279
12	Switzerland	292	261	300	230	264	230	286	310	145	~~80~~	302	230	324	210	~~110~~	267	316	~~115~~	210	—	260	303	~~85~~	~~135~~	294	5034
13	Finland	282	286	259	190	344	220	285	219	~~125~~	~~65~~	285	220	274	270	~~95~~	319	211	~~35~~	130	160	259	283	~~35~~	~~95~~	194	4690
14	Canada	234	251	293	180	237	180	251	264	~~85~~	~~145~~	267	250	247	230	~~125~~	302	271	~~125~~	200	200	330	274	~~100~~	~~90~~	184	4645
15	United States	304	302	259	~~140~~	261	170	282	233	~~115~~	~~105~~	278	200	252	~~120~~	~~100~~	293	317	~~50~~	170	190	244	297	145	180	238	4615
16	Lithuania	287	255	248	130	189	110	194	292	~~50~~	85	256	150	240	180	~~75~~	244	266	~~40~~	60	170	194	191	~~60~~	~~55~~	175	3856
17	Belgium	260	268	241	120	182	160	187	186	—	100	209	80	192	90	~~55~~	234	212	~~85~~	90	140	218	149	—	115	244	3507
18	Slovakia	207	181	199	160	195	120	158	141	~~60~~	~~35~~	229	190	156	200	~~70~~	237	212	~~55~~	150	120	223	143	~~80~~	~~70~~	200	3421
19	Bulgaria	237	218	218	110	190	140	188	242	—	—	—	—	—	—	85	246	302	65	160	150	205	213	90	45	273	3377
20	Estonia	240	190	134	150	146	100	208	110	~~80~~	~~75~~	196	180	213	150	~~65~~	176	206	110	110	—	146	118	~~55~~	~~85~~	119	3002
21	Latvia	232	192	186	100	205	70	131	175	~~65~~	70	209	120	190	110	~~45~~	200	266	90	100	110	222	~~52~~	70	~~30~~	56	2978
22	Japan	151	137	97	170	176	150	150	108	~~70~~	~~45~~	146	110	215	100	~~60~~	138	169	~~70~~	140	180	187	155	~~95~~	100	152	2834
23	Poland	129	201	203	90	154	130	129	216	100	~~60~~	156	100	175	80	~~40~~	144	197	~~30~~	70	90	101	130	~~65~~	~~50~~	—	2595
24	Kazakhstan	95	83	~~58~~	80	94	90	85	159	~~55~~	110	171	130	82	160	~~25~~	177	182	~~75~~	80	100	~~74~~	142	75	~~35~~	182	2277
25	Romania	—	—	—	—	58	80	71	149	45	55	155	90	180	140	~~35~~	189	262	60	180	130	96	120	~~40~~	60	138	2258
26	Moldova	—	—	90	—	72	—	100	137	—	50	198	—	—	—	50	166	98	25	120	—	145	217	50	65	110	1693
27	Serbia	27	61	61	—	51	—	64	43	—	—	31	—	—	—	—	39	39	—	—	—	27	—	—	—	—	443
28	Croatia	—	—	—	—	—	—	45	57	—	40	39	—	—	—	—	80	37	20	—	—	74	—	—	—	—	392
29	South Korea	—	—	—	—	—	—	—	—	—	—	—	—	—	—	30	56	98	45	50	—	17	27	—	40	—	362
30	Greece	47	51	15	—	23	—	49	31	—	—	—	—	—	—	—	42	70	—	—	—	—	—	—	—	—	328
#	Nation	KON IN	KON SP	KON2 SP	KON2 RL	HOC SP	HOC RL	HOC2 SP	OBE SP	OBE MR	OBE SR	OBE2 SP	OBE RL	ANT IN	ANT RL	POK MR	POK SP	POK IN	POK SR	POK RL	NOV RL	NOV SP	NOV2 SP	NOV2 MR	NOV2 SR	ÖST SP	Total
31	New Zealand	—	—	—	—	—	—	—	—	—	—	—	—	—	—	—	66	—	—	—	—	—	—	—	—	—	66
32	Spain	—	—	—	—	—	—	—	—	—	—	—	—	—	—	—	19	29	—	—	—	—	—	—	—	—	48
33	United Kingdom	—	—	—	—	—	—	—	—	—	—	—	—	—	—	—	21	25	—	—	—	—	—	—	—	—	46
34	Hungary	—	—	—	—	—	—	—	—	—	—	—	—	—	—	—	15	21	—	—	—	—	—	—	—	—	36
35	North Macedonia	—	—	—	—	—	—	—	—	—	—	—	—	—	—	—	13	—	—	—	—	—	—	—	—	—	13
