= 2020–21 Biathlon World Cup – Nation Women =

The Nation's Cup Score Women in the 2020–21 Biathlon World Cup is led by Norway, who is the defending titlist. Each nation's score comprises the points earned by its three best placed athletes in every Sprint and Individual competition, the points earned in the Women's Relay competitions, and half of the points earned in the Mixed Relay competitions.

For this season only the best 19 results out of 25 will be counted towards the standings.

== 2018–19 Top 3 standings ==
Medal	Nation	Points
Gold:	Norway	7865
Silver:	Germany	7202
Bronze:	France	7058

== Standings ==
#	Nation	KON IN	KON SP	KON2 SP	KON2 RL	HOC SP	HOC RL	HOC2 SP	OBE SP	OBE MR	OBE SR	OBE2 SP	OBE RL	ANT IN	ANT RL	POK MR	POK SP	POK IN	POK SR	POK RL	NOV RL	NOV SP	NOV2 SP	NOV2 MR	NOV2 SR	ÖST SP	Total
1	Norway	351	429	407	250	426	420	462	414	~~195~~	~~180~~	403	270	339	290	339	422	399	~~195~~	420	310	434	413	~~210~~	~~195~~	446	7865
2	Sweden	431	443	435	420	370	360	412	393	~~95~~	~~195~~	389	360	329	270	329	375	380	~~180~~	310	420	324	357	~~180~~	~~210~~	368	7202
3	Germany	406	359	373	360	386	330	389	361	~~155~~	~~165~~	392	420	399	390	399	406	370	~~135~~	390	200	386	383	~~115~~	~~105~~	356	7058
4	France	392	393	384	390	356	390	377	406	~~180~~	~~210~~	410	310	389	360	389	383	315	~~210~~	250	360	373	372	~~165~~	~~145~~	391	6896
5	Belarus	377	360	344	200	383	220	368	353	~~165~~	~~155~~	345	390	342	310	342	341	324	~~100~~	330	390	324	351	~~110~~	~~125~~	381	6479
6	Russia	348	351	373	330	351	250	348	385	~~210~~	~~115~~	342	330	406	420	406	317	384	~~105~~	210	250	354	304	~~135~~	~~155~~	354	6371
7	Ukraine	330	322	371	310	332	270	292	328	~~110~~	~~90~~	311	250	392	250	392	361	337	~~165~~	360	330	398	369	~~155~~	~~110~~	303	6253
8	Austria	354	343	368	270	330	290	329	342	~~105~~	~~125~~	394	230	395	200	395	337	373	~~145~~	270	230	308	360	~~125~~	~~165~~	334	6239
9	Italy	307	315	328	290	340	310	324	249	~~135~~	~~135~~	387	170	356	330	356	379	345	~~155~~	230	270	379	327	~~195~~	~~80~~	314	5857
10	Switzerland	303	356	303	220	319	230	291	335	~~145~~	~~80~~	328	220	326	250	326	376	401	~~115~~	200	220	333	321	~~85~~	~~135~~	332	5806
11	Czech Republic	303	274	334	210	321	210	356	309	~~90~~	–	339	290	289	220	289	240	357	~~80~~	220	140	367	371	~~105~~	~~75~~	176	5183
12	United States	286	241	283	230	333	200	295	272	~~115~~	~~105~~	257	200	285	190	285	300	271	~~50~~	190	290	175	306	~~145~~	~~180~~	211	5047
13	Poland	255	316	264	190	259	190	246	322	~~100~~	~~60~~	281	180	303	170	303	298	280	~~30~~	290	210	269	266	~~65~~	~~50~~	–	4647
14	Canada	264	234	238	160	304	170	306	260	~~85~~	~~145~~	241	210	303	210	303	286	279	~~125~~	160	190	205	139	~~100~~	~~90~~	~~98~~	4515
15	Estonia	280	289	277	150	201	160	270	215	~~80~~	~~75~~	288	160	226	160	226	260	256	~~110~~	150	150	223	215	~~55~~	~~85~~	256	4406
16	Finland	243	203	187	180	289	180	213	236	~~125~~	~~65~~	260	190	219	150	219	225	240	~~35~~	180	130	288	285	~~35~~	~~95~~	224	4182
17	Japan	171	271	240	120	210	120	171	133	~~70~~	~~45~~	214	150	210	140	210	216	241	~~70~~	170	160	170	143	~~95~~	~~100~~	149	3964
18	Slovakia	136	~~58~~	138	110	163	150	202	193	~~60~~	~~35~~	141	120	201	130	201	239	196	~~55~~	110	170	257	185	~~80~~	~~70~~	270	3733
19	Kazakhstan	171	99	165	130	79	100	136	181	~~55~~	110	153	140	236	180	236	196	277	~~75~~	120	180	157	160	~~75~~	~~35~~	193	3419
20	Bulgaria	180	236	134	170	151	140	178	282	–	–	–	–	–	–	85	165	238	65	140	–	155	166	90	45	267	3255
21	South Korea	132	89	184	140	118	110	150	221	–	–	239	130	195	120	30	138	225	45	90	–	187	158	–	~~40~~	59	3143
22	Slovenia	150	177	150	–	125	130	163	144	75	95	161	–	–	–	80	155	196	95	130	120	166	209	~~45~~	–	150	3068
23	Latvia	33	38	72	–	198	–	66	143	65	70	132	–	140	–	45	175	212	90	100	–	103	144	70	~~30~~	184	2424
24	Lithuania	165	72	126	–	117	–	105	146	50	85	129	–	148	75	135	155	40	–	–	–	85	118	60	55	104	1917
25	Belgium	96	77	57	–	93	–	59	63	–	100	68	–	90	–	55	143	166	85	–	–	97	95	–	115	104	1566
26	Moldova	–	–	17	–	25	–	33	87	–	50	80	–	–	–	50	186	69	25	–	–	226	171	50	65	128	515
27	Romania	–	–	–	–	46	90	30	36	45	55	60	–	84	–	35	151	120	60	–	–	24	141	40	60	113	506
28	United Kingdom	35	51	–	–	66	–	65	–	–	–	–	–	–	–	–	59	–	–	–	–	82	–	–	–	69	355
29	Croatia	–	–	–	–	19	–	29	33	–	40	37	–	–	–	–	72	82	20	–	–	25	–	–	–	–	332
30	Greenland	–	–	–	–	29	–	55	–	–	–	–	–	–	–	–	64	76	–	–	–	–	–	–	–	67	237
#	Nation	KON IN	KON SP	KON2 SP	KON2 RL	HOC SP	HOC RL	HOC2 SP	OBE SP	OBE MR	OBE SR	OBE2 SP	OBE RL	ANT IN	ANT RL	POK MR	POK SP	POK IN	POK SR	POK RL	NOV RL	NOV SP	NOV2 SP	NOV2 MR	NOV2 SR	ÖST SP	Total
31	Australia	23	25	15	–	13	–	31	–	–	–	–	–	–	–	–	29	41	–	–	–	–	–	–	–	–	116
