= 2020–21 Biathlon World Cup – Mass start Women =

The 2020–21 Biathlon World Cup – Mass start Women started on 20 December 2020 in Hochfilzen and will finished on 21 March 2021 in Östersund

== Competition format ==
In the mass start, all biathletes start at the same time and the first across the finish line wins. In this 12.5 kilometres (7.8 mi) competition, the distance is skied over five laps; there are four bouts of shooting (two prone and two standing, in that order) with the first shooting bout being at the lane corresponding to the competitor's bib number (bib #10 shoots at lane #10 regardless of position in race), with the rest of the shooting bouts being on a first-come, first-served basis (if a competitor arrives at the lane in fifth place, they shoot at lane 5). As in the sprint and pursuit, competitors must ski one 150 metres (490 ft) penalty loop for each miss. Here again, to avoid unwanted congestion, World Cup Mass starts are held with only the 30 top ranking athletes on the start line (half that of the pursuit) as here all contestants start simultaneously.

== 2019–20 Top 3 standings ==
Medal	Athlete	Points
Gold:	Dorothea Wierer (ITA)	223
Silver:	Tiril Eckhoff (NOR)	210
Bronze:	Hanna Öberg (SWE)	200

== Medal winners ==
Event	Gold	Time	Silver	Time	Bronze	Time
Hochfilzen (2) details	Marte Olsbu Røiseland; Norway	34:05.4 (0+1+0+0)	Tiril Eckhoff; Norway	34:19.4 (0+0+1+0)	Dorothea Wierer; Italy	34:32.3 (0+0+1+0)
Oberhof (2) details	Julia Simon; France	40:11.1 (0+1+2+0)	Franziska Preuß; Germany	40:15.0 (1+0+1+0)	Hanna Öberg; Sweden	40:22.8 (1+0+1+1)
Antholz-Anterselva details	Julia Simon; France	37:05.5 (1+1+1+0)	Hanna Öberg; Sweden	37:05.7 (0+0+1+0)	Lisa Theresa Hauser; Austria	37:09.0 (0+0+1+0)
World Championships details	Lisa Theresa Hauser; Austria	36:05.7 (0+0+0+0)	Ingrid Landmark Tandrevold; Norway	36:27.4 (0+0+1+0)	Tiril Eckhoff; Norway	36:28.7 (1+0+1+1)
Östersund details	Ingrid Landmark Tandrevold; Norway	34:53.1 (0+1+3+1)	Dzinara Alimbekava; Belarus	35:00.0 (1+2+0+3)	Franziska Preuß; Germany	34:04.2 (0+1+4+1)

== Standings ==
4 of 5 competitions scored

#	Name	HOC 2	OBH 2	ANT	POK	OST	Total
1	Ingrid Landmark Tandrevold (NOR)	29	43	~~6~~	54	60	186
2	Franziska Preuß (GER)	~~32~~	54	43	38	48	183
3	Julia Simon (FRA)	36	60	60	25	~~2~~	181
4	Marte Olsbu Røiseland (NOR)	60	36	36	43	~~4~~	175
5	Tiril Eckhoff (NOR)	54	~~34~~	34	48	36	172
6	Lisa Theresa Hauser (AUT)	34	29	48	60	~~18~~	171
7	Hanna Öberg (SWE)	27	48	54	36	~~14~~	165
8	Dorothea Wierer (ITA)	48	38	24	34	~~10~~	144
9	Markéta Davidová (CZE)	43	31	40	28	~~27~~	142
10	Svetlana Mironova (RUS)	–	30	38	22	34	124
11	Dzinara Alimbekava (BLR)	21	28	~~2~~	10	54	113
12	Justine Braisaz-Bouchet (FRA)	30	32	27	~~6~~	24	113
13	Elvira Öberg (SWE)	38	20	~~14~~	27	23	108
14	Denise Herrmann (GER)	40	26	10	–	30	106
15	Janina Hettich (GER)	31	23	20	–	32	106
16	Mona Brorsson (SWE)	25	40	12	–	28	105
17	Linn Persson (SWE)	24	27	~~21~~	30	22	103
18	Emma Lunder (CAN)	26	25	26	24	–	101
19	Lisa Vittozzi (ITA)	12	24	~~8~~	40	21	97
20	Karoline Offigstad Knotten (NOR)	28	14	28	–	20	90
21	Anaïs Bescond (FRA)	23	18	32	16	~~12~~	89
22	Uliana Kaisheva (RUS)	–	22	18	–	40	80
23	Vanessa Hinz (GER)	–	–	23	31	25	79
24	Lena Häcki (SUI)	–	–	–	26	43	69
25	Dunja Zdouc (AUT)	20	12	16	–	16	64
26	Yuliia Dzhima (UKR)	–	–	31	–	29	60
27	Anaïs Chevalier-Bouchet (FRA)	18	~~2~~	25	8	6	57
28	Hanna Sola (BLR)	6	–	–	2	38	46
29	Irina Kazakevich (RUS)	14	–	–	21	–	35
30	Baiba Bendika (LAT)	–	–	–	32	–	32
#	Name	HOC 2	OBH 2	ANT	POK	OST	Total
31	Clare Egan (USA)	22	6	4	–	–	32
32	Emilie Kalkenberg (NOR)	–	–	–	–	31	31
33	Evgeniya Pavlova (RUS)	–	–	30	–	–	30
34	Larisa Kuklina (RUS)	–	–	29	–	–	29
34	Olena Pidhrushna (UKR)	–	–	–	29	–	29
36	Milena Todorova (BUL)	–	–	–	–	26	26
37	Selina Gasparin (SUI)	–	–	–	23	–	23
38	Marion Deigentesch (GER)	–	–	22	–	–	22
39	Ekaterina Avvakumova (KOR)	–	21	–	–	–	21
40	Elisa Gasparin (SUI)	–	–	–	20	–	20
41	Darya Blashko (UKR)	16	–	–	4	–	20
42	Elena Kruchinkina (BLR)	2	10	–	–	8	20
43	Monika Hojnisz-Staręga (SUI)	–	–	–	18	–	18
44	Tuuli Tomingas (EST)	–	16	–	–	–	16
45	Ida Lien (NOR)	–	–	–	14	–	14
46	Susan Dunklee (USA)	–	–	–	12	–	12
47	Johanna Skottheim (SWE)	10	–	–	–	–	10
48	Julia Schwaiger (AUT)	–	8	–	–	–	8
48	Chloé Chevalier (FRA)	8	–	–	–	–	8
50	Eva Puskarčíková (CZE)	4	–	–	–	–	4
50	Maren Hammerschmidt (GER)	–	4	–	–	–	4
