= 2020–21 Biathlon World Cup – Individual Women =

The 2020–21 Biathlon World Cup – Individual Women started on 28 November 2020 in Kontiolahti and will finished on 16 February 2021 in Pokljuka.

== Competition format ==
The individual race is the oldest biathlon event; the distance is skied over five laps. The biathlete shoots four times at any shooting lane, in the order of prone, standing, prone, standing, totalling 20 targets. Competitors' starts are staggered, normally by 30 seconds. The distance skied is usually 20 kilometres (12.4 mi) with a fixed penalty time of one minute per missed target that is added to the skiing time of the biathlete. In the "Short Individual" the distance is 15 kilometres (9.3 mi) with a penalty time of 45 seconds per missed target.

== 2019–20 Top 3 standings ==
Medal	Athlete	Points
Gold:	(Sweden) Hanna Öberg	128
Silver:	(Italy) Dorothea Wierer	114
Bronze:	(France) Justine Braisaz	112

== Medal winners ==
Event	Gold	Time	Silver	Time	Bronze	Time
Kontiolahti details	Dorothea Wierer; Italy	44:00.9 (0+0+0+0)	Denise Herrmann; Germany	44:01.7 (1+0+0+0)	Johanna Skottheim; Sweden	44:25.0 (0+0+0+0)
Antholz-Anterselva details	Lisa Theresa Hauser; Austria	42:29.3 (0+0+1+0)	Yuliia Dzhima; Ukraine	43:13.0 (0+0+0+0)	Anaïs Chevalier-Bouchet; France	43:33.3 (0+0+0+1)
World Championships details	Markéta Davidová; Czech Republic	42:27.7 (0+0+0+0)	Hanna Öberg; Sweden	42:55.6 (0+0+1+0)	Ingrid Landmark Tandrevold; Norway	43:31.7 (0+1+0+0)

== Standings ==
#	Name	KON	ANT	POK	Total
1	Lisa Theresa Hauser (AUT)	~~3~~	60	43	103
1	Dorothea Wierer (ITA)	60	43	~~32~~	103
3	Hanna Öberg (SWE)	36	~~12~~	54	90
4	Yuliia Dzhima (UKR)	31	54	~~9~~	85
5	Markéta Davidová (CZE)	20	0	60	80
6	Denise Herrmann (GER)	54	~~24~~	26	80
7	Anaïs Chevalier-Bouchet (FRA)	32	48	~~14~~	80
8	Svetlana Mironova (RUS)	–	36	40	76
9	Dzinara Alimbekava (BLR)	34	34	~~24~~	68
10	Linn Persson (SWE)	40	26	~~20~~	66
11	Ingrid Landmark Tandrevold (NOR)	13	~~6~~	48	61
12	Anaïs Bescond (FRA)	38	~~22~~	23	61
13	Franziska Preuß (GER)	23	~~8~~	36	59
14	Uliana Kaisheva (RUS)	26	32	~~17~~	58
15	Dunja Zdouc (AUT)	27	31	0	58
16	Julia Schwaiger (AUT)	24	~~4~~	31	55
17	Larisa Kuklina (RUS)	0	27	27	54
18	Elvira Öberg (SWE)	43	0	6	49
19	Johanna Skottheim (SWE)	48	–	0	48
20	Lena Häcki (SUI)	~~1~~	18	29	47
21	Emma Lunder (CAN)	28	DNS	19	47
22	Evgeniya Pavlova (RUS)	8	38	–	46
23	Janina Hettich (GER)	5	40	–	45
24	Irene Cadurisch (SUI)	0	11	34	45
25	Monika Hojnisz-Staręga (POL)	0	20	25	45
26	Ida Lien (NOR)	11	0	30	41
27	Tiril Eckhoff (NOR)	0	23	18	41
28	Caroline Colombo (FRA)	22	19	–	41
29	Elena Kruchinkina (BLR)	25	0	15	40
30	Selina Gasparin (SUI)	DNS	0	38	38
#	Name	KON	ANT	POK	Total
31	Marte Olsbu Røiseland (NOR)	17	~~10~~	21	38
32	Vanessa Hinz (GER)	~~4~~	29	8	37
33	Maren Hammerschmidt (GER)	29	0	7	36
34	Lisa Vittozzi (ITA)	0	28	3	31
35	Marion Deigentesch (GER)	–	30	–	30
36	Mona Brorsson (SWE)	30	0	–	30
37	Ekaterina Avvakumova (KOR)	0	17	13	30
38	Anastasiya Merkushyna (UKR)	–	–	28	28
39	Olena Pidhrushna (UKR)	0	25	0	25
40	Johanna Talihärm (EST)	~~10~~	14	11	25
41	Karoline Offigstad Knotten (NOR)	21	3	–	24
42	Elisa Gasparin (SUI)	0	0	22	22
43	Susan Dunklee (USA)	0	21	0	21
44	Julia Simon (FRA)	19	0	DNF	19
45	Iryna Kryuko (BLR)	18	0	–	18
46	Galina Vishnevskaya-Sheporenko (KAZ)	–	–	16	16
47	Darya Blashko (UKR)	16	0	–	16
48	Megan Bankes (CAN)	0	16	0	16
49	Anna Mąka (POL)	–	15	0	15
50	Tuuli Tomingas (EST)	15	0	0	15
51	Tamara Voronina (RUS)	14	–	–	14
52	Valentyna Semerenko (UKR)	–	13	–	13
53	Joanne Reid (USA)	12	0	1	13
54	Tatiana Akimova (RUS)	–	0	12	12
55	Michela Carrara (ITA)	–	0	10	10
56	Mari Eder (FIN)	9	DNS	0	9
57	Hanna Sola (BLR)	0	9	0	9
58	Clare Egan (USA)	6	0	2	8
59	Sarah Beaudry (CAN)	0	7	0	7
60	Aita Gasparin (SUI)	7	0	–	7
#	Name	KON	ANT	POK	Total
61	Yelizaveta Belchenko (KAZ)	0	5	0	5
62	Lotte Lie (BEL)	0	0	5	5
63	Eva Puskarčíková (CZE)	0	0	4	4
64	Katharina Innerhofer (AUT)	0	2	0	2
65	Chloé Chevalier (FRA)	2	0	–	2
66	Jessica Jislová (CZE)	0	1	0	1
