= 2020–21 Biathlon World Cup – Relay Women =

The 2020–21 Biathlon World Cup – Relay Women started on 5 December 2020 in Kontiolahti and will finish on 4 March 2021 in Nové Město

== Competition format ==
The relay teams consist of four biathletes. Every athlete's leg is skied over three 2 kilometres (1.2 mi) laps for a total of 6 kilometres (3.7 mi), with two shooting rounds: one prone and one standing. For every round of five targets there are eight bullets available, though the last three can only be single-loaded manually from the spare round holders or from bullets deposited by the athlete into trays or onto the mat at the firing line. If after eight bullets there are still standing targets, one 150 metres (490 ft) penalty loop must be taken for each remaining target. The first-leg participants start all at the same time, and as in cross-country skiing relays, every athlete of a team must touch the team's next-leg participant to perform a valid changeover. On the first shooting stage of the first leg, the participant must shoot in the lane corresponding to their bib number (bib #10 shoots at lane #10 regardless of their position in the race), then for the remainder of the relay, the athletes shoot at the lane corresponding to the position they arrived (arrive at the range in 5th place, shoot at lane five).

== 2019–20 Top 3 standings ==
Medal	Athlete	Points
Gold:	Norway	360
Silver:	Switzerland	260
Bronze:	Germany	260

== Medal winners ==
Event	Gold	Time	Silver	Time	Bronze	Time
Kontiolahti (2) details	align="right"| 1:12:44.5 (0+0) (0+2) (0+1) (0+1) (0+1) (0+2) (0+0) (0+1)	align="right"| 1:12:54.1 (0+0) (0+3) (0+0) (0+1) (0+0) (0+2) (0+0) (0+3)	align="right"| 1:13:28.4 (0+0) (0+2) (0+1) (0+3) (0+2) (0+2) (0+0) (0+2)			
Hochfilzen details	align="right"| 1:08:04.3 (0+0) (0+0) (0+1) (1+3) (0+0) (0+1) (0+0) (0+1)	align="right"| 1:08:28.8 (0+3) (0+3) (0+0) (0+3) (0+2) (0+1) (0+2) (0+2)	align="right"| 1:08:36.8 (0+0) (0+0) (0+0) (0+3) (0+2) (1+3) (0+0) (0+1)			
Oberhof (2) details	align="right"| 1:14:31.5 (0+0) (0+0) (0+0) (0+3) (0+1) (0+1) (0+0) (0+0)	align="right"| 1:14:48.9 (0+1) (0+1) (0+2) (0+0) (0+2) (0+1) (0+0) (0+2)	align="right"| 1:15:07.2 (0+0) (0+0) (0+0) (0+1) (0+3) (0+1) (0+0) (0+0)			
Antholz-Anterselva details	align="right"| 1:07:32.4 (0+1) (0+3) (0+0) (0+1) (0+1) (0+1) (0+0) (0+2)	align="right"| 1:07:43.4 (0+1) (0+0) (0+0) (0+1) (0+1) (0+2) (0+0) (0+1)	align="right"| 1:07:53.6 (0+0) (1+3) (0+0) (0+0) (0+2) (0+2) (0+1) (0+1)			
World Championships details	align="right"| 1:10:39.0 (0+0) (0+1) (0+2) (0+1) (0+1) (0+2) (0+3) (0+1)	align="right"| 1:10:47.8 (0+0) (0+0) (0+2) (0+0) (0+3) (0+0) (0+0) (0+0)	align="right"| 1:10:48.2 (0+1) (0+0) (0+1) (0+2) (0+1) (0+0) (0+0) (0+2)			
Nové Město details	align="right"| 1:03:26.6 (0+1) (0+0) (0+2) (0+0) (0+1) (0+0) (0+0) (0+2)	align="right"| 1:03:27.8 (0+0) (0+1) (0+0) (0+1) (0+3) (0+2) (0+1) (0+1)	align="right"| 1:03:54.4 (0+0) (0+1) (0+1) (0+0) (1+3) (0+0) (0+3) (0+0)			

== Standings ==
4 of 6 competitions scored

#	Name	KON 2	HOC	OBH 2	ANT	WCH	NME	Total
1	Sweden	60	48	48	~~36~~	~~40~~	60	216
2	Germany	48	~~43~~	60	54	54	~~29~~	216
3	France	54	54	~~40~~	48	~~34~~	48	204
4	Norway	~~34~~	60	~~36~~	38	60	40	198
5	Belarus	~~29~~	~~31~~	54	40	43	54	191
6	Russia	43	~~34~~	43	60	~~30~~	34	180
7	Ukraine	40	36	~~34~~	~~34~~	48	43	167
8	Italy	38	40	~~26~~	43	~~32~~	36	157
9	Austria	36	38	~~32~~	~~29~~	36	32	142
10	Czech Republic	~~30~~	30	38	31	31	~~23~~	130
11	United States	32	29	29	~~28~~	~~28~~	38	128
12	Switzerland	31	32	~~31~~	34	~~29~~	31	128
13	Poland	28	28	~~27~~	~~26~~	38	30	124
14	Canada	~~25~~	26	30	30	~~25~~	28	114
15	Finland	27	27	28	~~24~~	27	~~22~~	109
16	Kazakhstan	22	~~19~~	23	27	~~21~~	27	99
17	Estonia	~~24~~	25	25	25	~~24~~	24	99
18	Japan	~~21~~	~~21~~	24	23	26	25	98
19	Slovakia	~~20~~	24	21	22	~~20~~	26	93
20	South Korea	23	20	22	21	~~8~~	DSQ	86
21	Bulgaria	26	23	–	–	23	–	72
22	Slovenia	–	22	–	–	22	21	65
23	Latvia	–	–	–	–	19	–	19
24	Romania	–	18	–	–	–	–	18
