= 2020–21 Biathlon World Cup – Relay Men =

The 2020–21 Biathlon World Cup – Relay Men started on 6 December 2020 in Kontiolahti and will finished on 5 March 2021 in Nové Město

== Competition format ==
The relay teams consist of four biathletes. Every athlete's leg is skied over three 2.5 kilometres (1.6 mi) laps for a total of 7.5 kilometres (4.7 mi), with two shooting rounds: one prone and one standing. For every round of five targets there are eight bullets available, though the last three can only be single-loaded manually from the spare round holders or from bullets deposited by the athlete into trays or onto the mat at the firing line. If after eight bullets there are still standing targets, one 150 metres (490 ft) penalty loop must be taken for each remaining target. The first-leg participants start all at the same time, and as in cross-country skiing relays, every athlete of a team must touch the team's next-leg participant to perform a valid changeover. On the first shooting stage of the first leg, the participant must shoot in the lane corresponding to their bib number (bib #10 shoots at lane #10 regardless of their position in the race), then for the remainder of the relay, the athletes shoot at the lane corresponding to the position they arrived (arrive at the range in 5th place, shoot at lane five).

== 2019–20 Top 3 standings ==
Medal	Athlete	Points
Gold:	Norway	348
Silver:	France	302
Bronze:	Germany	264

== Medal winners ==
Event	Gold	Time	Silver	Time	Bronze	Time
Kontiolahti (2) details	align="right"| 1:16:21.0 (0+0) (0+2) (0+0) (0+2) (0+0) (0+1) (0+3) (0+1)	align="right"| 1:17:00.2 (0+3) (0+1) (0+1) (0+2) (0+1) (0+1) (0+0) (0+1)	align="right"| 1:17:11.7 (0+1) (0+3) (0+0) (0+2) (0+0) (0+1) (0+0) (0+2)			
Hochfilzen details	align="right"| 1:16:31.5 (0+0) (0+2) (0+0) (0+1) (0+0) (0+3) (0+0) (0+2)	align="right"| 1:16:37.2 (0+0) (0+2) (0+1) (0+2) (0+0) (0+2) (0+1) (1+3)	align="right"| 1:17:15.6 (0+1) (0+3) (0+0) (0+0) (0+1) (0+0) (0+2) (0+0)			
Oberhof (2) details	align="right"| 1:22:28.0 (0+1) (0+1) (0+0) (0+0) (0+1) (0+1) (0+1) (0+1)	align="right"| 1:22:32.2 (0+0) (0+1) (1+3) (0+0) (0+0) (0+0) (0+0) (0+0)	align="right"| 1:23:34.6 (0+0) (0+1) (0+0) (0+0) (0+2) (0+0) (0+0) (0+2)			
Antholz-Anterselva details	align="right"| 1:14:25.8 (0+2) (0+1) (0+1) (0+3) (0+0) (0+1) (0+1) (0+0)	align="right"| 1:14:26.6 (0+2) (0+0) (0+1) (1+3) (0+1) (0+1) (0+0) (0+1)	align="right"| 1:15:16.6 (0+0) (0+0) (0+0) (0+1) (0+0) (1+3) (0+0) (0+3)			
World Championships details	align="right"| 1:12:27.4 (0+1) (0+1) (0+0) (0+3) (0+1) (0+0) (0+0) (0+2)	align="right"| 1:13:00.5 (0+3) (0+0) (0+1) (0+0) (0+2) (0+1) (0+0) (0+0)	align="right"| 1:13:18.3 (0+2) (0+0) (0+0) (0+1) (0+0) (0+1) (0+0) (0+1)			
Nové Město details	align="right"| 1:12:28.1 (0+0) (0+2) (0+0) (0+1) (0+0) (0+1) (0+1) (0+0)	align="right"| 1:13:49.8 (0+3) (0+0) (0+0) (0+0) (0+2) (0+3) (0+0) (0+0)	align="right"| 1:14:01.3 (0+0) (0+0) (0+0) (1+3) (0+0) (1+3) (0+0) (1+3)			

== Standings ==
4 of 6 competitions scored

#	Name	KON 2	HOC	OBH 2	ANT	POK	NME	Total
1	Norway	60	~~54~~	54	54	60	~~48~~	228
2	Sweden	54	60	36	~~26~~	54	~~30~~	204
3	France	~~26~~	~~38~~	60	60	43	40	203
4	Germany	48	48	~~40~~	43	~~36~~	60	199
5	Russia	~~43~~	~~43~~	43	48	48	54	193
6	Italy	40	~~34~~	48	40	38	~~36~~	166
7	Austria	38	36	~~26~~	38	~~31~~	38	150
8	Ukraine	~~31~~	~~28~~	38	34	40	32	144
9	Slovenia	~~29~~	~~29~~	30	31	34	43	138
10	Czech Republic	36	40	~~23~~	~~22~~	28	31	135
11	Finland	28	31	31	36	~~22~~	~~25~~	126
12	Belarus	30	30	~~25~~	~~28~~	32	34	126
13	Switzerland	33	32	32	~~30~~	30	DNS	126
14	Canada	~~27~~	~~27~~	34	32	29	29	124
15	United States	~~23~~	26	29	~~21~~	26	28	109
16	Slovakia	25	~~21~~	28	29	24	~~21~~	106
17	Japan	26	24	~~20~~	~~19~~	23	27	100
18	Lithuania	22	~~20~~	24	27	~~15~~	26	99
19	Estonia	24	~~19~~	27	24	20	–	95
20	Bulgaria	20	23	–	–	25	24	92
21	Romania	–	~~17~~	18	23	27	22	90
22	Belgium	21	25	~~17~~	~~18~~	18	23	87
23	Kazakhstan	~~17~~	18	22	25	~~17~~	19	84
24	Latvia	~~19~~	~~16~~	21	20	19	20	80
25	Poland	18	22	19	~~17~~	~~16~~	18	77
26	Moldova	–	–	–	–	21	–	21
27	South Korea	–	–	–	–	14	–	14
