= 2020–21 Biathlon World Cup – Mass start Men =

The 2020–21 Biathlon World Cup – Mass start Men started on 20 December 2020 in Hochfilzen and will finished on 21 March 2021 in Östersund

== Competition format ==
In the mass start, all biathletes start at the same time and the first across the finish line wins. In this 15 kilometres (9.3 mi) competition, the distance is skied over five laps; there are four bouts of shooting (two prone and two standing, in that order) with the first shooting bout being at the lane corresponding to the competitor's bib number (bib #10 shoots at lane #10 regardless of position in race), with the rest of the shooting bouts being on a first-come, first-served basis (if a competitor arrives at the lane in fifth place, they shoot at lane 5). As in the sprint and pursuit, competitors must ski one 150 metres (490 ft) penalty loop for each miss. Here again, to avoid unwanted congestion, World Cup Mass starts are held with only the 30 top ranking athletes on the start line (half that of the pursuit) as here all contestants start simultaneously.

== 2019–20 Top 3 standings ==
Medal	Athlete	Points
Gold:	(Norway) Johannes Thingnes Bø	228
Silver:	(France) Quentin Fillon Maillet	216
Bronze:	(France) Martin Fourcade	203

== Medal winners ==
Event	Gold	Time	Silver	Time	Bronze	Time
Hochfilzen (2) details	Arnd Peiffer; Germany	35:53.3 (0+0+0+0)	Martin Ponsiluoma; Sweden	35:54.6 (0+0+0+0)	Tarjei Bø; Norway	36:02.6 (2+0+1+0)
Oberhof (2) details	Tarjei Bø; Norway	37:41.9 (0+0+0+1)	Felix Leitner; Austria	37:45.5 (0+0+0+0)	Benjamin Weger; Switzerland	37:49.7 (0+0+0+0)
Antholz-Anterselva details	Johannes Thingnes Bø; Norway	35:44.3 (0+0+0+1)	Quentin Fillon Maillet; France	36:15.6 (1+0+0+1)	Jakov Fak; Slovenia	36:28.5 (0+0+1+0)
World Championships details	Sturla Holm Lægreid; Norway	36:27.2 (0+0+0+1)	Johannes Dale; Norway	36:37.4 (0+1+1+0)	Quentin Fillon Maillet; France	36:40.0 (1+1+0+0)
Östersund details	Simon Desthieux; France	35:43.7 (0+1+1+0)	Eduard Latypov; Russia	35:52.6 (0+0+2+0)	Johannes Thingnes Bø; Norway	36:01.2 (1+1+0+1)

== Standings ==
4 of 5 competitions scored

#	Name	HOC 2	OBH 2	ANT	POK	OST	Total
1	Tarjei Bø (NOR)	48	60	~~29~~	38	38	184
2	Johannes Thingnes Bø (NOR)	36	36	60	~~34~~	48	180
3	Quentin Fillon Maillet (FRA)	32	31	54	48	~~29~~	165
4	Sturla Holm Lægreid (NOR)	38	29	~~27~~	60	34	161
5	Arnd Peiffer (GER)	60	30	40	29	–	159
6	Jakov Fak (SLO)	25	~~23~~	48	40	36	149
7	Simon Eder (AUT)	30	40	34	43	~~12~~	147
8	Johannes Dale (NOR)	26	~~25~~	32	54	32	144
9	Benedikt Doll (GER)	43	24	36	~~16~~	40	143
10	Vetle Sjåstad Christiansen (NOR)	28	26	43	~~25~~	43	140
11	Simon Desthieux (FRA)	~~13~~	32	18	28	60	137
12	Lukas Hofer (ITA)	27	43	26	36	~~23~~	132
13	Martin Ponsiluoma (SWE)	54	~~14~~	31	22	18	125
14	Émilien Jacquelin (FRA)	40	27	30	~~2~~	27	124
15	Sebastian Samuelsson (SWE)	34	28	28	31	~~14~~	121
16	Eduard Latypov (RUS)	16	~~4~~	21	27	54	118
17	Benjamin Weger (SUI)	23	48	24	–	21	116
18	Matvey Eliseev (RUS)	21	38	~~6~~	26	24	109
19	Erik Lesser (GER)	24	34	14	–	28	100
20	Alexander Loginov (RUS)	31	–	22	32	–	85
21	Antonin Guigonnat (FRA)	~~6~~	16	8	24	30	78
22	Felix Leitner (AUT)	–	54	4	–	2	60
23	Fabien Claude (FRA)	10	10	23	–	16	59
24	Erlend Bjøntegaard (NOR)	–	18	38	–	–	56
25	Aleksander Fjeld Andersen (NOR)	29	–	–	–	26	55
26	David Komatz (AUT)	18	6	25	–	–	49
27	Dmytro Pidruchnyi (UKR)	14	21	–	–	8	43
28	Michal Krčmář (CZE)	22	–	–	10	10	42
29	Evgeniy Garanichev (RUS)	20	–	2	–	20	42
30	Roman Rees (GER)	–	–	16	–	25	41
#	Name	HOC 2	OBH 2	ANT	POK	OST	Total
31	Scott Gow (CAN)	–	–	–	–	31	31
32	Christian Gow (CAN)	–	–	–	30	–	30
33	Andrejs Rastorgujevs (LAT)	–	12	–	18	–	30
34	Miha Dovžan (SLO)	–	–	–	23	–	23
35	Anton Smolski (BLR)	–	–	–	–	22	22
35	Dominik Windisch (ITA)	–	22	–	–	–	22
37	Said Karimulla Khalili (RUS)	–	–	–	21	–	21
38	Sergey Bocharnikov (BLR)	–	20	–	–	–	20
38	Didier Bionaz (ITA)	–	–	20	–	–	20
38	Artem Pryma (UKR)	–	–	–	20	–	20
41	Jesper Nelin (SWE)	8	–	–	6	6	20
42	Thomas Bormolini (ITA)	–	–	–	14	–	14
43	Florent Claude (BEL)	–	–	–	12	–	12
44	Anton Dudchenko (UKR)	–	–	12	–	–	12
45	Jeremy Finello (SUI)	–	–	10	–	–	10
46	Peppe Femling (SWE)	–	2	–	8	–	10
47	Michal Šíma (SVK)	–	8	–	–	–	8
48	Julian Eberhard (AUT)	4	–	–	–	–	4
48	Vladimir Iliev (BUL)	–	–	–	–	4	4
48	Jake Brown (USA)	–	–	–	4	–	4
51	Ondřej Moravec (CZE)	2	–	–	–	–	2
