= 2020–21 Biathlon World Cup – Individual Men =

The 2020–21 Biathlon World Cup – Individual Men started on 28 November 2020 in Kontiolahti and will finished on 17 February 2021 in Pokljuka.

== Competition format ==
The individual race is the oldest biathlon event; the distance is skied over five laps. The biathlete shoots four times at any shooting lane, in the order of prone, standing, prone, standing, totalling 20 targets. Competitors' starts are staggered, normally by 30 seconds. The distance skied is usually 20 kilometres (12.4 mi) with a fixed penalty time of one minute per missed target that is added to the skiing time of the biathlete. In the "Short Individual" the distance is 15 kilometres (9.3 mi) with a penalty time of 45 seconds per missed target.

== 2019–20 Top 3 standings ==
Medal	Athlete	Points
Gold:	(France) Martin Fourcade	174
Silver:	(Norway) Johannes Thingnes Bø	145
Bronze:	(France) Quentin Fillon Maillet	120

== Medal winners ==
Event	Gold	Time	Silver	Time	Bronze	Time
Kontiolahti details	Sturla Holm Lægreid; Norway	48:57.0 (0+0+0+0)	Johannes Thingnes Bø; Norway	49:16.6 (1+0+0+0)	Erik Lesser; Germany	50:00.6 (0+1+0+0)
Antholz-Anterselva details	Alexander Loginov; Russia	48:41.8 (0+0+0+0)	Sturla Holm Lægreid; Norway	49:40.3 (0+1+1+0)	Quentin Fillon Maillet; France	49:52.4 (0+0+1+1)
World Championships details	Sturla Holm Lægreid; Norway	49:27.6 (0+0+0+0)	Arnd Peiffer; Germany	49:44.5 (0+0+0+0)	Johannes Dale; Norway	50:08.5 (0+1+0+0)

== Standings ==
#	Name	KON	ANT	POK	Total
1	Sturla Holm Lægreid (NOR)	60	~~54~~	60	120
2	Johannes Thingnes Bø (NOR)	54	~~31~~	40	94
3	Alexander Loginov (RUS)	31	60	~~10~~	91
4	Quentin Fillon Maillet (FRA)	~~43~~	48	43	91
5	Arnd Peiffer (GER)	~~24~~	30	54	84
6	Ondřej Moravec (CZE)	40	~~8~~	30	70
7	Simon Eder (AUT)	~~19~~	34	36	70
8	Johannes Dale (NOR)	18	~~14~~	48	66
9	Lukas Hofer (ITA)	~~21~~	43	22	65
10	Émilien Jacquelin (FRA)	34	~~16~~	28	62
11	Erlend Bjøntegaard (NOR)	28	32	–	60
12	Jakov Fak (SLO)	36	~~4~~	20	56
13	Roman Rees (GER)	~~13~~	25	31	56
14	Tarjei Bø (NOR)	29	26	0	55
15	Sebastian Samuelsson (SWE)	38	0	16	54
16	Evgeniy Garanichev (RUS)	–	27	25	52
17	Antonin Guigonnat (FRA)	32	19	–	51
18	Artem Pryma (UKR)	~~14~~	18	32	50
19	Benedikt Doll (GER)	~~12~~	15	34	49
20	Erik Lesser (GER)	48	0	–	48
21	Jeremy Finello (SUI)	0	24	24	48
22	Simon Desthieux (FRA)	26	20	~~13~~	46
23	Martin Ponsiluoma (SWE)	0	38	6	44
24	Michal Krčmář (CZE)	30	–	14	44
25	Andrejs Rastorgujevs (LAT)	20	0	23	43
26	Anton Dudchenko (UKR)	0	40	0	40
27	David Komatz (AUT)	11	29	0	40
28	Johannes Kühn (GER)	~~1~~	23	17	40
29	Vetle Sjåstad Christiansen (NOR)	3	36	–	39
30	Felix Leitner (AUT)	0	12	27	39
#	Name	KON	ANT	POK	Total
31	Said Karimulla Khalili (RUS)	–	–	38	38
32	Anton Smolski (BLR)	22	13	~~12~~	35
33	Vladimir Iliev (BUL)	0	–	29	29
34	Benjamin Weger (SUI)	8	21	0	29
35	Didier Bionaz (ITA)	0	28	0	28
36	Florent Claude (BEL)	7	0	21	28
37	Tuomas Harjula (FIN)	27	0	0	27
38	Peppe Femling (SWE)	0	0	26	26
39	Tero Seppälä (FIN)	0	22	4	26
40	Vytautas Strolia (LTU)	25	0	0	25
41	Leif Nordgren (USA)	16	0	9	25
42	Christian Gow (CAN)	23	0	0	23
43	Mikita Labastau (BLR)	0	9	11	20
44	Jake Brown (USA)	0	0	19	19
45	Miha Dovžan (SLO)	0	0	18	18
46	Kosuke Ozaki (JPN)	0	17	0	17
47	Sergey Bocharnikov (BLR)	17	0	0	17
48	Milan Žemlička (CZE)	–	2	15	17
49	Julian Eberhard (AUT)	~~6~~	10	7	17
50	Matvey Eliseev (RUS)	15	–	0	15
51	Philipp Horn (GER)	–	11	–	11
52	Rene Zahkna (EST)	0	3	8	11
53	Harald Lemmerer (AUT)	10	0	–	10
54	Jesper Nelin (SWE)	9	0	0	9
55	Karol Dombrovski (LTU)	5	0	3	8
56	Artem Tyshchenko (UKR)	–	7	0	7
57	Tomáš Krupčík (CZE)	0	6	–	6
58	Alex Cisar (SLO)	–	5	0	5
59	George Buta (ROU)	–	0	5	5
60	Petr Pashchenko (RUS)	4	–	–	4
#	Name	KON	ANT	POK	Total
61	Adam Runnalls (CAN)	0	0	2	2
62	Sean Doherty (USA)	2	0	0	2
63	Andrzej Nędza-Kubiniec (POL)	0	1	0	1
64	Scott Gow (CAN)	0	0	1	1
