= 2020–21 Biathlon World Cup =

Biathlon competition

Discipline	Men	Women
Overall	(Norway) Johannes Thingnes Bø (3)	(Norway) Tiril Eckhoff (1)
U25	(Norway) Sturla Holm Lægreid (1)	(Belarus) Dzinara Alimbekava (1)
Individual	(Norway) Sturla Holm Lægreid (1)	(Austria) Lisa Theresa Hauser (1) (Italy) Dorothea Wierer (2)
Sprint	(Norway) Johannes Thingnes Bø (2)	(Norway) Tiril Eckhoff (1)
Pursuit	(Norway) Sturla Holm Lægreid (1)	(Norway) Tiril Eckhoff (2)
Mass start	(Norway) Tarjei Bø (1)	(Norway) Ingrid Landmark Tandrevold (1)
Relay	Norway (12)	Sweden (1)
Nations Cup	Norway (17)	Norway (6)
- Mixed: Norway (7)

Competition

The 2020–21 Biathlon World Cup (BWC) was a multi-race series over a season of biathlon, organised by the International Biathlon Union. The season started on 28 November 2020 in Kontiolahti, Finland and ended on 21 March 2021 in Östersund, Sweden.

Starting from this season a blue bib will be introduced for the best biathlete under the age of 25.

== Calendar ==
World Championships

Below is the IBU World Cup calendar for the 2020–21 season.

Stage	Location	Date	Individual	Sprint	Pursuit	Mass start	Relay	Mixed relay	Single mixed relay	Details
1	(Finland) Kontiolahti	28–29 November	●	●						details
2	(Finland) Kontiolahti	3–6 December		●	●		●			details
3	(Austria) Hochfilzen	11–13 December		●	●		●			details
4	(Austria) Hochfilzen	17–20 December		●	●	●				details
5	(Germany) Oberhof	8–10 January		●	●			●	●	details
6	(Germany) Oberhof	13–17 January		●		●	●			details
7	(Italy) Antholz-Anterselva	21–24 January	●			●	●			details
WC	(Slovenia) Pokljuka	10–21 February	●	●	●	●	●	●	●	World Championships
8	(Czech Republic) Nové Město	4–7 March		●	●		●			details
9	(Czech Republic) Nové Město	11–14 March		●	●			●	●	details
10	(Sweden) Östersund (Note: Events scheduled in Oslo-Holmenkollen was cancelled due to pandemic, and replaced by Östersund.)	18–21 March		●	●	●				details
Total: 70 (32 men's, 32 women's, 6 mixed)			3 (m, w)	10 (m, w)	8 (m, w)	5 (m, w)	6 (m, w)	3 (mix)	3 (mix)	

=== Calendar changes ===
- On 28 September the rounds originally scheduled at Östersund, Sweden and Le Grand-Bornand, France were replaced by additional rounds at Kontiolahti, Finland and Hochfilzen, Austria respectively.
- On 5 October it was announced that Oberhof will host two events, replacing Ruhpolding.
- A round which was set to be held in Beijing as test event for the 2022 Winter Olympics was replaced on 23 November with another round at Nové Město.
- On 13 February the round originally scheduled at Oslo-Holmenkollen, Norway was replaced by additional rounds at Östersund, Sweden.

== World Cup podiums ==
=== Men ===
Stage	Date	Place	Discipline	Winner	Second	Third	Yellow bib (After competition)	Dark blue bib (After competition)	Det.
1	28 November 2020	(Finland) Kontiolahti	20 km Individual	(Norway) Sturla Holm Lægreid	(Norway) Johannes Thingnes Bø	(Germany) Erik Lesser	(Norway) Sturla Holm Lægreid	(Norway) Sturla Holm Lægreid	Detail
1	29 November 2020	(Finland) Kontiolahti	10 km Sprint	(Norway) Johannes Thingnes Bø	(Sweden) Sebastian Samuelsson	(Sweden) Martin Ponsiluoma	(Norway) Johannes Thingnes Bø	(Sweden) Sebastian Samuelsson	Detail
2	3 December 2020	(Finland) Kontiolahti	10 km Sprint	(Norway) Tarjei Bø	(Germany) Arnd Peiffer	(Norway) Johannes Thingnes Bø	(Norway) Johannes Thingnes Bø	(Sweden) Sebastian Samuelsson	Detail
2	5 December 2020	(Finland) Kontiolahti	12.5 km Pursuit	(Sweden) Sebastian Samuelsson	(France) Fabien Claude	(Norway) Johannes Thingnes Bø	(Norway) Johannes Thingnes Bø	(Sweden) Sebastian Samuelsson	Detail
3	11 December 2020	(Austria) Hochfilzen	10 km Sprint	(Norway) Johannes Dale	(France) Quentin Fillon Maillet	(France) Fabien Claude	(Norway) Johannes Thingnes Bø	(Sweden) Sebastian Samuelsson	Detail
3	12 December 2020	(Austria) Hochfilzen	12.5 km Pursuit	(France) Quentin Fillon Maillet	(France) Émilien Jacquelin	(Norway) Johannes Dale	(Norway) Johannes Thingnes Bø	(Sweden) Sebastian Samuelsson	Detail
4	17 December 2020	(Austria) Hochfilzen	10 km Sprint	(Norway) Sturla Holm Lægreid	(Norway) Johannes Dale	(Norway) Johannes Thingnes Bø	(Norway) Johannes Thingnes Bø	(Sweden) Sebastian Samuelsson	Detail
4	19 December 2020	(Austria) Hochfilzen	12.5 km Pursuit	(Norway) Sturla Holm Lægreid	(France) Émilien Jacquelin	(Norway) Johannes Thingnes Bø	(Norway) Johannes Thingnes Bø	(Norway) Sturla Holm Lægreid	Detail
4	20 December 2020	(Austria) Hochfilzen	15 km Mass Start	(Germany) Arnd Peiffer	(Sweden) Martin Ponsiluoma	(Norway) Tarjei Bø	(Norway) Johannes Thingnes Bø	(Norway) Sturla Holm Lægreid	Detail
5	8 January 2021	(Germany) Oberhof	10 km Sprint	(Norway) Johannes Thingnes Bø	(Norway) Tarjei Bø	(Norway) Sturla Holm Lægreid	(Norway) Johannes Thingnes Bø	(Norway) Sturla Holm Lægreid	Detail
5	9 January 2021	(Germany) Oberhof	12.5 km Pursuit	(Norway) Sturla Holm Lægreid	(Norway) Johannes Dale	(Norway) Tarjei Bø	(Norway) Johannes Thingnes Bø	(Norway) Sturla Holm Lægreid	Detail
6	13 January 2021	(Germany) Oberhof	10 km Sprint	(Norway) Johannes Thingnes Bø	(Norway) Sturla Holm Lægreid	(Germany) Arnd Peiffer	(Norway) Johannes Thingnes Bø	(Norway) Sturla Holm Lægreid	Detail
6	17 January 2021	(Germany) Oberhof	15 km Mass Start	(Norway) Tarjei Bø	(Austria) Felix Leitner	(Switzerland) Benjamin Weger	(Norway) Johannes Thingnes Bø	(Norway) Sturla Holm Lægreid	Detail
7	22 January 2021	(Italy) Antholz-Anterselva	20 km Individual	(Russia) Alexandr Loginov	(Norway) Sturla Holm Lægreid	(France) Quentin Fillon Maillet	(Norway) Johannes Thingnes Bø	(Norway) Sturla Holm Lægreid	Detail
7	24 January 2021	(Italy) Antholz-Anterselva	15 km Mass Start	(Norway) Johannes Thingnes Bø	(France) Quentin Fillon Maillet	(Slovenia) Jakov Fak	(Norway) Johannes Thingnes Bø	(Norway) Sturla Holm Lægreid	Detail
WC	12 February 2021	(Slovenia) Pokljuka	10 km Sprint	(Sweden) Martin Ponsiluoma	(France) Simon Desthieux	(France) Émilien Jacquelin	(Norway) Johannes Thingnes Bø	(Norway) Sturla Holm Lægreid	Detail
WC	14 February 2021	(Slovenia) Pokljuka	12.5 km Pursuit	(France) Émilien Jacquelin	(Sweden) Sebastian Samuelsson	(Norway) Johannes Thingnes Bø	(Norway) Johannes Thingnes Bø	(Norway) Sturla Holm Lægreid	Detail
WC	17 February 2021	(Slovenia) Pokljuka	20 km Individual	(Norway) Sturla Holm Lægreid	(Germany) Arnd Peiffer	(Norway) Johannes Dale	(Norway) Johannes Thingnes Bø	(Norway) Sturla Holm Lægreid	Detail
WC	21 February 2021	(Slovenia) Pokljuka	15 km Mass Start	(Norway) Sturla Holm Lægreid	(Norway) Johannes Dale	(France) Quentin Fillon Maillet	(Norway) Johannes Thingnes Bø	(Norway) Sturla Holm Lægreid	Detail
8	6 March 2021	(Czech Republic) Nové Město na M.	10 km Sprint	(France) Simon Desthieux	(Sweden) Sebastian Samuelsson	(Germany) Arnd Peiffer	(Norway) Johannes Thingnes Bø	(Norway) Sturla Holm Lægreid	Detail
8	7 March 2021	(Czech Republic) Nové Město na M.	12.5 km Pursuit	(Norway) Tarjei Bø	(Norway) Johannes Thingnes Bø	(France) Simon Desthieux	(Norway) Johannes Thingnes Bø	(Norway) Sturla Holm Lægreid	Detail
9	11 March 2021	(Czech Republic) Nové Město na M.	10 km Sprint	(France) Quentin Fillon Maillet	(Norway) Tarjei Bø	(Italy) Lukas Hofer	(Norway) Johannes Thingnes Bø	(Norway) Sturla Holm Lægreid	Detail
9	13 March 2021	(Czech Republic) Nové Město na M.	12.5 km Pursuit	(France) Quentin Fillon Maillet	(Norway) Johannes Thingnes Bø	(France) Émilien Jacquelin	(Norway) Johannes Thingnes Bø	(Norway) Sturla Holm Lægreid	Detail
10	19 March 2021	(Sweden) Östersund (Note: Men's events scheduled in Oslo-Holmenkollen was cancelled due to pandemic.)	10 km Sprint	(Italy) Lukas Hofer	(Sweden) Sebastian Samuelsson	(Norway) Tarjei Bø	(Norway) Johannes Thingnes Bø	(Norway) Sturla Holm Lægreid	Detail
10	20 March 2021	(Sweden) Östersund	12.5 km Pursuit	(Norway) Sturla Holm Lægreid	(Norway) Johannes Thingnes Bø	(Italy) Lukas Hofer	(Norway) Johannes Thingnes Bø	(Norway) Sturla Holm Lægreid	Detail
10	21 March 2021	(Sweden) Östersund	15 km Mass Start	(France) Simon Desthieux	(Russia) Eduard Latypov	(Norway) Johannes Thingnes Bø	(Norway) Johannes Thingnes Bø	(Norway) Sturla Holm Lægreid	Detail

=== Women ===
Stage	Date	Place	Discipline	Winner	Second	Third	Yellow bib (After competition)	Dark blue bib (After competition)	Det.
1	28 November 2020	(Finland) Kontiolahti	15 km Individual	(Italy) Dorothea Wierer	(Germany) Denise Herrmann	(Sweden) Johanna Skottheim	(Italy) Dorothea Wierer	(Sweden) Elvira Öberg	Detail
1	29 November 2020	(Finland) Kontiolahti	7.5 km Sprint	(Sweden) Hanna Öberg	(Norway) Marte Olsbu Røiseland	(Norway) Karoline Offigstad Knotten	(Sweden) Hanna Öberg	(Belarus) Dzinara Alimbekava	Detail
2	3 December 2020	(Finland) Kontiolahti	7.5 km Sprint	(Sweden) Hanna Öberg	(France) Anaïs Chevalier-Bouchet	(Sweden) Elvira Öberg	(Sweden) Hanna Öberg	(Sweden) Elvira Öberg	Detail
2	6 December 2020	(Finland) Kontiolahti	10 km Pursuit	(Norway) Tiril Eckhoff	(Norway) Marte Olsbu Røiseland	(Sweden) Hanna Öberg	(Sweden) Hanna Öberg	(Belarus) Dzinara Alimbekava	Detail
3	11 December 2020	(Austria) Hochfilzen	7.5 km Sprint	(Belarus) Dzinara Alimbekava	(Norway) Tiril Eckhoff	(Germany) Franziska Preuß	(Sweden) Hanna Öberg	(Belarus) Dzinara Alimbekava	Detail
3	13 December 2020	(Austria) Hochfilzen	10 km Pursuit	(Norway) Marte Olsbu Røiseland	(Belarus) Dzinara Alimbekava	(France) Julia Simon	(Norway) Marte Olsbu Røiseland	(Belarus) Dzinara Alimbekava	Detail
4	18 December 2020	(Austria) Hochfilzen	7.5 km Sprint	(Norway) Tiril Eckhoff	(Norway) Ingrid Landmark Tandrevold	(Norway) Marte Olsbu Røiseland	(Norway) Marte Olsbu Røiseland	(Belarus) Dzinara Alimbekava	Detail
4	19 December 2020	(Austria) Hochfilzen	10 km Pursuit	(Norway) Tiril Eckhoff	(Sweden) Hanna Öberg	(Sweden) Elvira Öberg	(Norway) Marte Olsbu Røiseland	(Belarus) Dzinara Alimbekava	Detail
4	20 December 2020	(Austria) Hochfilzen	12.5 km Mass Start	(Norway) Marte Olsbu Røiseland	(Norway) Tiril Eckhoff	(Italy) Dorothea Wierer	(Norway) Marte Olsbu Røiseland	(Sweden) Elvira Öberg	Detail
5	8 January 2021	(Germany) Oberhof	7.5 km Sprint	(Norway) Tiril Eckhoff	(Sweden) Hanna Öberg	(Austria) Lisa Theresa Hauser	(Norway) Marte Olsbu Røiseland	(Sweden) Elvira Öberg	Detail
5	9 January 2021	(Germany) Oberhof	10 km Pursuit	(Norway) Tiril Eckhoff	(Norway) Marte Olsbu Røiseland	(Austria) Lisa Theresa Hauser	(Norway) Marte Olsbu Røiseland	(Sweden) Elvira Öberg	Detail
6	14 January 2021	(Germany) Oberhof	7.5 km Sprint	(Norway) Tiril Eckhoff	(Italy) Dorothea Wierer	(Austria) Lisa Theresa Hauser	(Norway) Marte Olsbu Røiseland	(Sweden) Elvira Öberg	Detail
6	17 January 2021	(Germany) Oberhof	12.5 km Mass Start	(France) Julia Simon	(Germany) Franziska Preuß	(Sweden) Hanna Öberg	(Norway) Marte Olsbu Røiseland	(Sweden) Elvira Öberg	Detail
7	21 January 2021	(Italy) Antholz-Anterselva	15 km Individual	(Austria) Lisa Theresa Hauser	(Ukraine) Yuliia Dzhima	(France) Anaïs Chevalier-Bouchet	(Norway) Marte Olsbu Røiseland	(Belarus) Dzinara Alimbekava	Detail
7	23 January 2021	(Italy) Antholz-Anterselva	12.5 km Mass Start	(France) Julia Simon	(Sweden) Hanna Öberg	(Austria) Lisa Theresa Hauser	(Norway) Marte Olsbu Røiseland	(Belarus) Dzinara Alimbekava	Detail
WC	13 February 2021	(Slovenia) Pokljuka	7.5 km Sprint	(Norway) Tiril Eckhoff	(France) Anaïs Chevalier-Bouchet	(Belarus) Hanna Sola	(Norway) Tiril Eckhoff	(Sweden) Elvira Öberg	Detail
WC	14 February 2021	(Slovenia) Pokljuka	10 km Pursuit	(Norway) Tiril Eckhoff	(Austria) Lisa Theresa Hauser	(France) Anaïs Chevalier-Bouchet	(Norway) Tiril Eckhoff	(Sweden) Elvira Öberg	Detail
WC	16 February 2021	(Slovenia) Pokljuka	15 km Individual	(Czech Republic) Markéta Davidová	(Sweden) Hanna Öberg	(Norway) Ingrid Landmark Tandrevold	(Norway) Tiril Eckhoff	(Sweden) Elvira Öberg	Detail
WC	21 February 2021	(Slovenia) Pokljuka	12.5 km Mass Start	(Austria) Lisa Theresa Hauser	(Norway) Ingrid Landmark Tandrevold	(Norway) Tiril Eckhoff	(Norway) Tiril Eckhoff	(Sweden) Elvira Öberg	Detail
8	6 March 2021	(Czech Republic) Nové Město na M.	7.5 km Sprint	(Norway) Tiril Eckhoff	(Ukraine) Yuliia Dzhima	(Italy) Lisa Vittozzi	(Norway) Tiril Eckhoff	(Belarus) Dzinara Alimbekava	Detail
8	7 March 2021	(Czech Republic) Nové Město na M.	10 km Pursuit	(Norway) Tiril Eckhoff	(Germany) Denise Herrmann	(Norway) Marte Olsbu Røiseland	(Norway) Tiril Eckhoff	(Belarus) Dzinara Alimbekava	Detail
9	12 March 2021	(Czech Republic) Nové Město na M.	7.5 km Sprint	(Norway) Tiril Eckhoff	(Germany) Denise Herrmann	(Italy) Dorothea Wierer	(Norway) Tiril Eckhoff	(Belarus) Dzinara Alimbekava	Detail
9	13 March 2021	(Czech Republic) Nové Město na M.	10 km Pursuit	(Norway) Tiril Eckhoff	(Belarus) Dzinara Alimbekava	(Germany) Franziska Preuß	(Norway) Tiril Eckhoff	(Belarus) Dzinara Alimbekava	Detail
10	19 March 2021	(Sweden) Östersund (Note: Women's events scheduled in Oslo-Holmenkollen was cancelled due to pandemic.)	7.5 km Sprint	(Norway) Tiril Eckhoff	(Italy) Dorothea Wierer	(Norway) Ingrid Landmark Tandrevold	(Norway) Tiril Eckhoff	(Belarus) Dzinara Alimbekava	Detail
10	20 March 2021	(Sweden) Östersund	10 km Pursuit	(Norway) Marte Olsbu Røiseland	(Norway) Tiril Eckhoff	(Belarus) Hanna Sola	(Norway) Tiril Eckhoff	(Belarus) Dzinara Alimbekava	Detail
10	21 March 2021	(Sweden) Östersund	12.5 km Mass Start	(Norway) Ingrid Landmark Tandrevold	(Belarus) Dzinara Alimbekava	(Germany) Franziska Preuß	(Norway) Tiril Eckhoff	(Belarus) Dzinara Alimbekava	Detail

=== Men's team – 4x7.5 km Relay ===
Stage	Date	Place	Winner	Second	Third	Leader (After competition)	Det.
2	6 December 2020	(Finland) Kontiolahti	Norway Sturla Holm Lægreid; Vetle Sjåstad Christiansen; Tarjei Bø; Johannes Thingnes Bø	Sweden Peppe Femling; Jesper Nelin; Martin Ponsiluoma; Sebastian Samuelsson	Germany Erik Lesser; Roman Rees; Arnd Peiffer; Benedikt Doll	Norway	Detail
3	13 December 2020	(Austria) Hochfilzen	Sweden Peppe Femling; Jesper Nelin; Martin Ponsiluoma; Sebastian Samuelsson	Norway Sturla Holm Lægreid; Johannes Dale; Tarjei Bø; Johannes Thingnes Bø	Germany Erik Lesser; Roman Rees; Benedikt Doll; Philipp Horn	Norway; Sweden	Detail
6	15 January 2021	(Germany) Oberhof	France Simon Desthieux; Quentin Fillon Maillet; Fabien Claude; Émilien Jacquelin	Norway Vetle Sjåstad Christiansen; Johannes Dale; Tarjei Bø; Johannes Thingnes Bø	Italy Thomas Bormolini; Lukas Hofer; Tommaso Giacomel; Dominik Windisch	Norway	Detail
7	23 January 2021	(Italy) Antholz-Anterselva	France Antonin Guigonnat; Quentin Fillon Maillet; Simon Desthieux; Émilien Jacquelin	Norway Sturla Holm Lægreid; Johannes Dale; Tarjei Bø; Johannes Thingnes Bø	Russia Anton Babikov; Matvey Eliseev; Alexandr Loginov; Eduard Latypov	Norway	Detail
WC	20 February 2021	(Slovenia) Pokljuka	Norway Sturla Holm Lægreid; Tarjei Bø; Johannes Thingnes Bø; Vetle Sjåstad Christiansen	Sweden Peppe Femling; Jesper Nelin; Martin Ponsiluoma; Sebastian Samuelsson	RBU Said Karimulla Khalili; Matvey Eliseev; Alexandr Loginov; Eduard Latypov	Norway	Detail
8	5 March 2021	(Czech Republic) Nové Město na M.	Germany Erik Lesser; Benedikt Doll; Arnd Peiffer; Philipp Nawrath	Russia Said Karimulla Khalili; Matvey Eliseev; Alexandr Loginov; Eduard Latypov	Norway Sturla Holm Lægreid; Johannes Dale; Tarjei Bø; Johannes Thingnes Bø	Norway	Detail

=== Women's team – 4x6 km Relay ===
Stage	Date	Place	Winner	Second	Third	Leader (After competition)	Det.
2	5 December 2020	(Finland) Kontiolahti	Sweden Johanna Skottheim; Mona Brorsson; Elvira Öberg; Hanna Öberg	France Anaïs Bescond; Anaïs Chevalier-Bouchet; Chloé Chevalier; Justine Braisaz-Bouchet	Germany Vanessa Hinz; Franziska Preuß; Maren Hammerschmidt; Denise Herrmann	Sweden	Detail
3	12 December 2020	(Austria) Hochfilzen	Norway Karoline Offigstad Knotten; Ingrid Landmark Tandrevold; Tiril Eckhoff; Marte Olsbu Røiseland	France Anaïs Bescond; Julia Simon; Justine Braisaz-Bouchet; Anaïs Chevalier-Bouchet	Sweden Johanna Skottheim; Linn Persson; Hanna Öberg; Elvira Öberg	Sweden	Detail
6	16 January 2021	(Germany) Oberhof	Germany Vanessa Hinz; Janina Hettich; Denise Herrmann; Franziska Preuß	Belarus Iryna Kryuko; Dzinara Alimbekava; Hanna Sola; Elena Kruchinkina	Sweden Mona Brorsson; Linn Persson; Elvira Öberg; Hanna Öberg	Sweden	Detail
7	24 January 2021	(Italy) Antholz-Anterselva	Russia Evgeniya Pavlova; Tatiana Akimova; Svetlana Mironova; Uliana Kaisheva	Germany Vanessa Hinz; Janina Hettich; Denise Herrmann; Franziska Preuß	France Anaïs Bescond; Anaïs Chevalier-Bouchet; Justine Braisaz-Bouchet; Julia Simon	Germany	Detail
WC	20 February 2021	(Slovenia) Pokljuka	Norway Ingrid Landmark Tandrevold; Tiril Eckhoff; Ida Lien; Marte Olsbu Røiseland	Germany Vanessa Hinz; Janina Hettich; Denise Herrmann; Franziska Preuß	Ukraine Anastasiya Merkushyna; Yuliia Dzhima; Darya Blashko; Olena Pidhrushna	Germany	Detail
8	4 March 2021	(Czech Republic) Nové Město na M.	Sweden Mona Brorsson; Hanna Öberg; Linn Persson; Elvira Öberg	Belarus Iryna Kryuko; Dzinara Alimbekava; Hanna Sola; Elena Kruchinkina	France Anaïs Bescond; Justine Braisaz-Bouchet; Chloé Chevalier; Julia Simon	Sweden	Detail

=== Mixed Relay ===
Stage	Date	Place	Discipline	Winner	Second	Third	Leader (After competition)	Det.
5	10 January 2021	(Germany) Oberhof	4x6 km	Russia Uliana Kaisheva; Svetlana Mironova; Alexandr Loginov; Eduard Latypov	Norway Ingrid Landmark Tandrevold; Marte Olsbu Røiseland; Johannes Dale; Sturla Holm Lægreid	France Anaïs Chevalier-Bouchet; Justine Braisaz-Bouchet; Fabien Claude; Quentin Fillon Maillet	Russia	Detail
5	10 January 2021	(Germany) Oberhof	1x6 km + 1x7.5 km	France Julia Simon; Émilien Jacquelin	Sweden Hanna Öberg; Sebastian Samuelsson	Norway Tiril Eckhoff; Johannes Thingnes Bø	France	Detail
WC	10 February 2021	(Slovenia) Pokljuka	4x7.5 km	Norway Sturla Holm Lægreid; Johannes Thingnes Bø; Tiril Eckhoff; Marte Olsbu Røiseland	Austria David Komatz; Simon Eder; Dunja Zdouc; Lisa Theresa Hauser	Sweden Sebastian Samuelsson; Martin Ponsiluoma; Linn Persson; Hanna Öberg	Norway	Detail
WC	18 February 2021	(Slovenia) Pokljuka	1x6 km + 1x7.5 km	France Antonin Guigonnat; Julia Simon	Norway Johannes Thingnes Bø; Tiril Eckhoff	Sweden Sebastian Samuelsson; Hanna Öberg	Norway	Detail
9	14 March 2021	(Czech Republic) Nové Město	4x6 km	Norway Tiril Eckhoff; Marte Olsbu Røiseland; Tarjei Bø; Johannes Thingnes Bø	Italy Lisa Vittozzi; Dorothea Wierer; Dominik Windisch; Lukas Hofer	Sweden Elvira Öberg; Anna Magnusson; Jesper Nelin; Martin Ponsiluoma	Norway	Detail
9	14 March 2021	(Czech Republic) Nové Město	1x6 km + 1x7.5 km	Sweden Linn Persson; Sebastian Samuelsson	Norway Ingrid Landmark Tandrevold; Sturla Holm Lægreid	United States Susan Dunklee; Sean Doherty	Norway	Detail

== Standings (men) ==
=== Overall ===
Pos.		Points
	(Norway) Johannes Thingnes Bø	1052
2.	(Norway) Sturla Holm Lægreid	1039
3.	(France) Quentin Fillon Maillet	930
4.	(Norway) Tarjei Bø	893
5.	(Norway) Johannes Dale	843
6.	(Sweden) Sebastian Samuelsson	817
7.	(France) Émilien Jacquelin	812
8.	(Italy) Lukas Hofer	753
9.	(France) Simon Desthieux	724
10.	(Sweden) Martin Ponsiluoma	713

- Final standings after 26 races.

=== Under 25 ===
Pos.		Points
	(Norway) Sturla Holm Laegreid	1039
2.	(Norway) Johannes Dale	843
3.	(Sweden) Sebastian Samuelsson	817
4.	(Austria) Felix Leitner	310
5.	(Belarus) Anton Smolski	264
6.	(Finland) Tero Seppälä	169
7.	(Norway) Aleksander Fjeld Andersen	134
8.	(Russia) Said Karimulla Khalili	111
9.	(Italy) Didier Bionaz	92
10.	(Ukraine) Anton Dudchenko	83

- Final standings after 26 races.

=== Individual ===
Pos.		Points
	(Norway) Sturla Holm Laegreid	120
2.	(Norway) Johannes Thingnes Bø	94
3.	(Russia) Alexandr Loginov	91
4.	(France) Quentin Fillon Maillet	91
5.	(Germany) Arnd Peiffer	84

- Final standings after 3 races.

=== Sprint ===
Pos.		Points
	(Norway) Johannes Thingnes Bø	359
2.	(Norway) Sturla Holm Lægreid	319
3.	(Norway) Tarjei Bø	318
4.	(Sweden) Sebastian Samuelsson	312
5.	(Norway) Johannes Dale	307

- Final standings after 10 races.

=== Pursuit ===
Pos.		Points
	(Norway) Sturla Holm Lægreid	306
2.	(Norway) Johannes Thingnes Bø	306
3.	(France) Émilien Jacquelin	286
4.	(France) Quentin Fillon Maillet	266
5.	(Sweden) Sebastian Samuelsson	253

- Final standings after 8 races.

=== Mass start ===
Pos.		Points
	(Norway) Tarjei Bø	184
2.	(Norway) Johannes Thingnes Bø	180
3.	(France) Quentin Fillon Maillet	165
4.	(Norway) Sturla Holm Lægreid	161
5.	(Germany) Arnd Peiffer	159

- Final standings after 5 races.

=== Relay ===
Pos.		Points
1.	Norway	228
2.	Sweden	204
3.	France	203
4.	Germany	199
5.	Russia	193

- Final standings after 6 races.

=== Nation ===
Pos.		Points
1.	Norway	8061
2.	France	7298
3.	Germany	6978
4.	Russia	6833
5.	Sweden	6775

- Final standings after 25 races.

== Standings (women) ==
=== Overall ===
Pos.		Points
	(Norway) Tiril Eckhoff	1152
2.	(Norway) Marte Olsbu Røiseland	963
3.	(Germany) Franziska Preuß	840
4.	(Sweden) Hanna Öberg	826
5.	(Italy) Dorothea Wierer	821
6.	(Austria) Lisa Theresa Hauser	818
7.	(Belarus) Dzinara Alimbekava	734
8.	(Norway) Ingrid Landmark Tandrevold	707
9.	(France) Anaïs Chevalier-Bouchet	677
10.	(Germany) Denise Herrmann	667

- Final standings after 26 races.

=== Under 25 ===
Pos.		Points
	(Belarus) Dzinara Alimbekava	734
2.	(Norway) Ingrid Landmark Tandrevold	707
3.	(Czech Republic) Markéta Davidová	649
4.	(Sweden) Elvira Öberg	631
5.	(France) Julia Simon	575
6.	(France) Justine Braisaz-Bouchet	511
7.	(Germany) Janina Hettich	379
8.	(Belarus) Hanna Sola	366
9.	(Norway) Ida Lien	276
10.	(Ukraine) Darya Blashko	273

- Final standings after 26 races.

=== Individual ===
Pos.		Points
	(Austria) Lisa Theresa Hauser	103
	(Italy) Dorothea Wierer	103
3.	(Sweden) Hanna Öberg	90
4.	(Ukraine) Yuliia Dzhima	85
5.	(Czech Republic) Markéta Davidová	80

- Final standings after 3 races.

=== Sprint ===
Pos.		Points
	(Norway) Tiril Eckhoff	420
2.	(Norway) Marte Olsbu Røiseland	304
3.	(Sweden) Hanna Öberg	296
4.	(Italy) Dorothea Wierer	282
5.	(France) Anaïs Chevalier-Bouchet	280

- Final standings after 10 races.

=== Pursuit ===
Pos.		Points
	(Norway) Tiril Eckhoff	360
2.	(Norway) Marte Olsbu Røiseland	319
3.	(Germany) Franziska Preuß	240
4.	(Sweden) Hanna Öberg	235
5.	(Belarus) Dzinara Alimbekava	226

- Final standings after 8 races.

=== Mass start ===
Pos.		Points
	(Norway) Ingrid Landmark Tandrevold	186
2.	(Germany) Franziska Preuß	183
3.	(France) Julia Simon	181
4.	(Norway) Marte Olsbu Røiseland	175
5.	(Norway) Tiril Eckhoff	172

- Final standings after 5 races.

=== Relay ===
Pos.		Points
1.	Sweden	216
2.	Germany	216
3.	France	204
4.	Norway	198
5.	Belarus	191

- Final standings after 6 races.

=== Nation ===
Pos.		Points
1.	Norway	7305
2.	Sweden	7146
3.	Germany	7056
4.	France	7001
5.	Belarus	6433

- Final standings after 25 races.

== Standings: Mixed ==
=== Mixed relay ===
Pos.		Points
1.	Norway	228
2.	France	211
3.	Sweden	210
4.	Austria	169
5.	Russia	168

- Final standings after 6 races.

== Medal table ==
Rank	Nation	Gold	Silver	Bronze	Total
1	Norway	38	25	20	83
2	France	12	10	12	34
3	Sweden	8	12	11	31
4	Germany	3	8	9	20
5	Russia RBU	3	2	2	7
6	Italy	2	3	6	11
7	Austria	2	3	4	9
8	Belarus	1	5	2	8
9	Czech Republic	1	0	0	1
10	Ukraine	0	2	1	3
11	Slovenia	0	0	1	1
11	Switzerland	0	0	1	1
11	United States	0	0	1	1
Totals (13 entries)		70	70	70	210

== Points distribution ==
The table shows the number of points won in the 2020/21 Biathlon World Cup for men and women. Relay events do not impact individual rankings.

Place	1	2	3	4	5	6	7	8	9	10	11	12	13	14	15	16	17	18	19	20	21	22	23	24	25	26	27	28	29	30	31	32	33	34	35	36	37	38	39	40
Individual	60	54	48	43	40	38	36	34	32	31	30	29	28	27	26	25	24	23	22	21	20	19	18	17	16	15	14	13	12	11	10	9	8	7	6	5	4	3	2	1
Sprint	60	54	48	43	40	38	36	34	32	31	30	29	28	27	26	25	24	23	22	21	20	19	18	17	16	15	14	13	12	11	10	9	8	7	6	5	4	3	2	1
Pursuit	60	54	48	43	40	38	36	34	32	31	30	29	28	27	26	25	24	23	22	21	20	19	18	17	16	15	14	13	12	11	10	9	8	7	6	5	4	3	2	1
Mass Start	60	54	48	43	40	38	36	34	32	31	30	29	28	27	26	25	24	23	22	21	20	18	16	14	12	10	8	6	4	2

== Achievements ==
First World Cup career victory

Men

- (Norway) Sturla Holm Lægreid, 23, in his 2nd season — Stage 1 Individual in Kontiolahti; it also was his first podium
- (Sweden) Sebastian Samuelsson, 23, in his 5th season — Stage 2 Pursuit in Kontiolahti; first podium was 2018–19 Sprint in Oberhof
- (Norway) Johannes Dale, 23, in his 3rd season — Stage 3 Sprint in Hochfilzen; it also was his first podium
- (Sweden) Martin Ponsiluoma, 25, in his 4th season — World Championships Sprint in Pokljuka; first podium was 2018–19 Sprint in Nové Město
- (France) Simon Desthieux, 29, in his 9th season — Stage 8 Sprint in Nové Město; first podium was 2017–18 Sprint in Tyumen

Women

- (Belarus) Dzinara Alimbekava, 24, in her 4th season — Stage 3 Sprint in Hochfilzen; it also was her first podium
- (Austria) Lisa Theresa Hauser, 27, in her 8th season — Stage 7 Individual in Antholz-Anterselva; first podium was 2020–21 Sprint in Oberhof
- (Norway) Ingrid Landmark Tandrevold, 24, in her 5th season — Stage 10 Mass Start in Östersund; first podium was 2018–19 Mass Start in Ruhpolding

First World Cup podium

Men

- (Norway) Sturla Holm Lægreid, 23, in his 2nd season — no. 1 in the Stage 1 Individual in Kontiolahti
- (Norway) Johannes Dale, 23, in his 3rd season — no. 1 in the Stage 3 Sprint in Hochfilzen
- (Austria) Felix Leitner, 24, in his 5th season – no. 2 in the Stage 6 Mass Start in Oberhof
- (Russia) Eduard Latypov, 26, in his 3rd season – no. 2 in the Stage 10 Mass Start in Östersund

Women

- (Sweden) Johanna Skottheim, 26, in her 5th season — no. 3 in the Stage 1 Individual in Kontiolahti
- (Norway) Karoline Offigstad Knotten, 25, in her 3rd season — no. 3 in the Stage 1 Sprint in Kontiolahti
- (Sweden) Elvira Öberg, 21, in her 2nd season — no. 3 in the Stage 2 Sprint in Kontiolahti
- (Belarus) Dzinara Alimbekava, 24, in her 4th season — no. 1 in the Stage 3 Sprint in Hochfilzen
- (Austria) Lisa Theresa Hauser, 27, in her 8th season - no. 3 in the Stage 5 Sprint in Oberhof
- (Belarus) Hanna Sola, 24, in her 3rd season — no. 3 in World Championships Sprint in Pokljuka

Victory in this World Cup (all-time number of victories in parentheses)

Men

- (Norway) Sturla Holm Lægreid, 7 (7) first places
- (Norway) Johannes Thingnes Bø, 4 (51) first places
- (Norway) Tarjei Bø, 3 (12) first places
- (France) Quentin Fillon Maillet, 3 (6) first places
- (France) Simon Desthieux, 2 (2) first places
- (Germany) Arnd Peiffer, 1 (10) first place
- (Russia) Alexandr Loginov, 1 (3) first place
- (Italy) Lukas Hofer, 1 (2) first place
- (France) Émilien Jacquelin, 1 (2) first place
- (Sweden) Sebastian Samuelsson, 1 (1) first place
- (Norway) Johannes Dale, 1 (1) first place
- (Sweden) Martin Ponsiluoma, 1 (1) first place

Women

- (Norway) Tiril Eckhoff, 13 (26) first places
- (Norway) Marte Olsbu Røiseland, 3 (9) first places
- (Sweden) Hanna Öberg, 2 (5) first places
- (France) Julia Simon, 2 (3) first places
- (Austria) Lisa Theresa Hauser, 2 (2) first places
- (Italy) Dorothea Wierer, 1 (12) first place
- (Czech Republic) Markéta Davidová, 1 (2) first place
- (Belarus) Dzinara Alimbekava, 1 (1) first place
- (Norway) Ingrid Landmark Tandrevold, 1 (1) first place

== Retirements ==
The following notable biathletes retired during or after the 2020–21 season:

Men

- (Belarus) Viktar Kryuko
- (Bulgaria) Vladimir Oryachkov
- (France) Martin Perrillat-Bottonet
- (Italy) Giuseppe Montello
- (Germany) Arnd Peiffer
- (Germany) Simon Schempp
- (Czech Republic) Ondřej Moravec
- (Kazakhstan) Anton Pantov
- (Norway) Lars Helge Birkeland
- (Poland) Marcin Szwajnos
- (Romania) Anatoliy Oskin
- (Russia) Alexey Slepov
- (United States) Carsen Campbell

Women

- (Bulgaria) Dafinka Koeva
- (Bulgaria) Stefani Popova
- (Bulgaria) Desislava Stoyanova
- (Croatia) Nika Blazenic
- (Italy) Nicole Gontier
- (South Korea) Anna Frolina
- (Poland) Krystyna Guzik
- (Russia) Leysan Biktasheva
- (Russia) Irina Starykh
- (Russia) Ekaterina Shumilova
- (Slovenia) Lea Einfalt
- (Slovenia) Nina Zadravec
- (Slovakia) Aneta Smerciakova
