= 2020–21 Biathlon World Cup – Mixed Relay =

The 2020–21 Biathlon World Cup – Mixed Relay started on 10 January 2021 in Oberhof and will finished on 14 March 2021 in Nové Město

== Competition format ==
The relay teams consist of four biathletes. Legs 1 and 2 are skied by either the two men or the two women; legs 3 and 4 are skied by the remaining athletes. The race consists of either four 6 kilometres (3.7 mi) legs or four 7.5 kilometres (4.7 mi) legs. Every athlete's leg is skied over three laps, with two shooting rounds: one prone and one standing. For every round of five targets there are eight bullets available, though the last three can only be single-loaded manually from the spare round holders or from bullets deposited by the athlete into trays or onto the mat at the firing line. If after eight bullets there are still standing targets, one 150 metres (490 ft) penalty loop must be taken for each remaining target. The first-leg participants all start at the same time, and as in cross-country skiing relays, every athlete of a team must touch the team's next-leg participant to perform a valid changeover. On the first shooting stage of the first leg, the participant must shoot in the lane corresponding to their bib number (bib #10 shoots at lane #10 regardless of their position in the race), then for the remainder of the relay, the athletes shoot at the lane corresponding to the position they arrived (arrive at the range in 5th place, shoot at lane five).

The single mixed relay involves one male and one female biathlete each completing two legs consisting of one prone and one standing shoot. The starting biathletes all start the race at the same time and complete one 3 kilometres (1.9 mi) leg before exchanging with their partner who completes another 3 kilometres (1.9 mi) leg. The athlete then exchanges back with their partner who completes another 3 kilometres (1.9 mi) leg before exchanging back and completing a final 4.5 kilometres (2.8 mi) leg, which includes an extra lap after the final shoot. The rules regarding shooting are the same as in the regular mixed relay.

== 2019–20 Top 3 standings ==
Medal	Athlete	Points
Gold:	Norway	307
Silver:	France	272
Bronze:	Germany	265

== Medal winners ==
Event	Gold	Time	Silver	Time	Bronze	Time
Oberhof (MR) details	align="right"| 1:08:21.7 (0+2) (0+1) (0+0) (0+0) (0+1) (0+2) (0+2) (0+2)	align="right"| 1:08:22.4 (0+0) (0+1) (0+2) (0+1) (0+0) (0+1) (0+1) (0+1)	align="right"| 1:08:33.8 (0+0) (0+0) (0+0) (0+2) (0+2) (0+2) (0+0) (0+0)			
Oberhof (SR) details	align="right"| 39:04.8 (0+0) (0+0) (0+0) (0+0) (0+2) (0+1) (0+0) (0+0)	align="right"| 39:43.5 (0+0) (0+1) (0+0) (0+2) (0+0) (0+1) (0+0) (0+1)	align="right"| 39:48.7 (0+0) (0+0) (0+0) (0+2) (0+0) (3+3) (0+3) (0+0)			
World Championships (MR) details	align="right"| 1:20:19.3 (0+0) (0+1) (0+1) (0+1) (0+2) (0+2) (0+1) (0+3)	align="right"| 1:20:46.3 (0+1) (0+0) (0+0) (0+0) (0+0) (0+0) (0+0) (0+1)	align="right"| 1:20:49.9 (0+0) (0+2) (0+1) (0+2) (0+0) (0+1) (0+2) (0+0)			
World Championships (SR) details	align="right"| 36:42.4 (0+2) (0+1) (0+0) (0+0) (0+0) (0+0) (0+1) (0+1)	align="right"| 36:45.2 (0+1) (0+2) (0+1) (0+1) (0+3) (0+1) (0+0) (0+0)	align="right"| 37:15.4 (0+2) (0+1) (0+0) (0+1) (0+0) (0+1) (0+2) (0+1)			
Nové Město (2) (MR) details	align="right"| 1:01:24.1 (0+0) (0+0) (0+1) (0+0) (0+0) (0+2) (0+1) (0+0)	align="right"| 1:02:32.8 (0+2) (0+2) (0+1) (0+1) (0+2) (0+1) (0+0) (0+1)	align="right"| 1:02:46.8 (0+3) (0+1) (0+1) (0+0) (0+0) (0+1) (0+1) (0+3)			
Nové Město (2) (SR) details	align="right"| 37:41.4 (0+0) (0+3) (0+1) (0+0) (0+1) (0+1) (0+0) (0+1)	align="right"| 37:42.9 (0+0) (0+2) (0+0) (0+1) (0+1) (0+1) (0+1) (0+0)	align="right"| 38:07.5 (0+0) (0+3) (0+0) (0+1) (0+0) (0+1) (0+1) (0+1)			

== Standings ==
4 of 6 competitions scored

#	Name	OBE MR	OBE SR	POK MR	POK SR	NME MR	NME SR	Total
1	Norway	~~54~~	~~48~~	60	54	60	54	228
2	France	48	60	~~40~~	60	43	~~38~~	211
3	Sweden	~~28~~	54	~~48~~	48	48	60	210
4	Austria	~~30~~	~~34~~	54	38	34	43	169
5	Russia	60	~~32~~	32	~~30~~	36	40	168
6	Italy	~~36~~	36	38	40	54	~~25~~	168
7	Ukraine	~~31~~	~~27~~	43	43	40	31	157
8	Germany	40	43	36	36	~~32~~	~~30~~	155
9	United States	32	30	~~29~~	~~19~~	38	48	148
10	Belarus	43	40	~~27~~	~~29~~	31	34	148
11	Switzerland	38	~~25~~	31	32	~~26~~	36	137
12	Canada	~~26~~	38	34	34	29	~~27~~	135
13	Finland	34	22	28	~~16~~	~~16~~	28	112
14	Czech Republic	27	DNS	30	25	30	~~24~~	112
15	Belgium	–	29	20	26	–	32	107
16	Estonia	25	24	~~22~~	31	~~20~~	26	106
17	Slovenia	24	28	25	28	~~18~~	DNS	105
18	Japan	23	~~18~~	~~21~~	23	28	29	103
19	Kazakhstan	20	31	~~14~~	24	24	~~16~~	99
20	Latvia	22	23	~~18~~	27	23	~~15~~	95
21	Bulgaria	DNS	DNS	26	22	27	18	93
22	Slovakia	21	~~16~~	23	~~20~~	25	23	92
23	Poland	29	21	~~17~~	~~15~~	22	19	91
24	Lithuania	~~19~~	26	24	~~17~~	21	20	91
25	Romania	18	20	~~16~~	21	~~17~~	21	80
26	Moldova	–	19	19	~~14~~	19	22	79
27	South Korea	–	–	15	18	–	17	50
28	Croatia	–	17	–	13	–	–	30
