= Johanna Skottheim =

Swedish biathlete (born 1994)

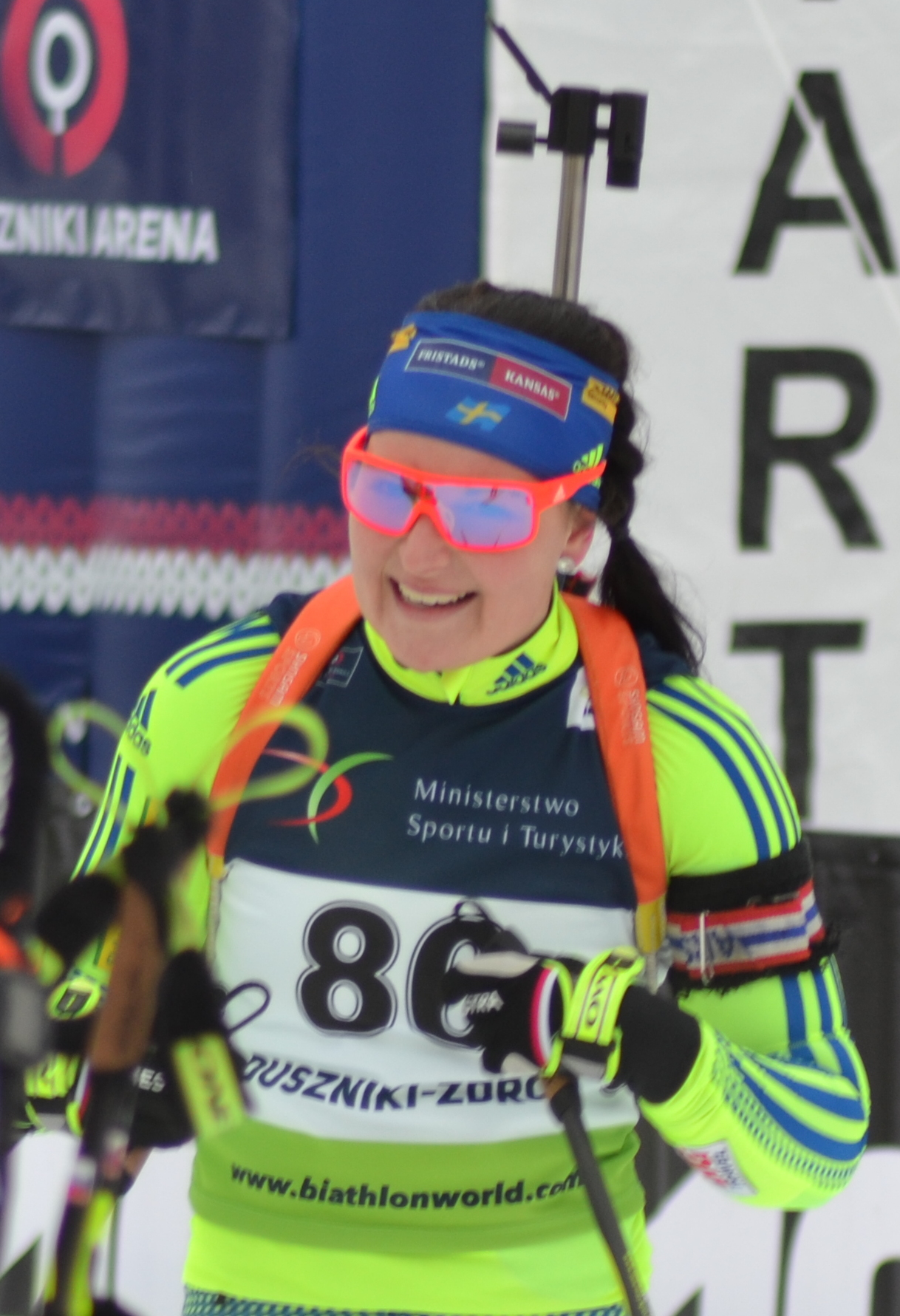
- Johanna Skottheim at the Open European Championships in Duszniki-Zdrój, Poland in January 2017

Personal information
- Nationality: Swedish
- Born: 29 May 1994 (age 32) Transtrand, Sweden
- Height: 1.67 m (5 ft 6 in)
- Weight: 63 kg (139 lb)

Sport

Professional information
- Sport: Biathlon
- Club: Lima SKG
- World Cup debut: 8 January 2016

World Championships
- Teams: 2 (2020–)

World Cup
- Seasons: 3 (2018-19–)
- Individual races: 24
- All races: 31
- Individual victories: 0
- All victories: 1
- Individual podiums: 1
- All podiums: 1
- Updated on 22 March 2021

Johanna Skottheim (born 29 May 1994) is a Swedish biathlete. In the first competition of the 2020/2021 season, she earned her first World Cup podium.

== Biathlon results ==
All results are sourced from the International Biathlon Union.

=== World Championships ===
Event	Individual	Sprint	Pursuit	Mass start	Relay	Mixed relay	Single mixed relay
(Italy) 2020 Antholz-Anterselva	43rd	—	—	—	—	—	—
(Slovenia) 2021 Pokljuka	49th	—	—	—	5th	—	—

=== World Cup ===
Season	Overall	Individual	Sprint	Pursuit	Mass start
2019-20	45th	—	53rd	23rd	—
2020-21	41st	19th	47th	40th	47th
2021-22	97th	—	82nd	81st	—
2022-23	63rd	55th	56th	—	—
2024-25	45th	20th	61st	51st	46th
2025-26	97th	74th	87th	80th	—

==== Individual podiums ====
- 0 victories
- 1 podiums

No.	Season	Date	Location	Race	Place
1	2020–21	28 November 2020	(Finland) Kontiolahti	Individual	3rd

==== Team podiums ====
- 2 victories
- 6 podiums

No.	Season	Date	Location	Race	Place	Team
1	2020–21	5 December 2020	(Finland) Kontiolahti	Relay	1st	Skottheim / Brorsson / E. Öberg / H. Öberg
2	2020–21	12 December 2020	(Austria) Hochfilzen	Relay	3rd	Skottheim / Persson / H. Öberg / E. Öberg
3	2021–22	14 January 2022	(Germany) Ruhpolding	Relay	2nd	Skottheim / Nilsson / Brorsson / Magnusson
4	2024–25	26 January 2025	(Italy) Antholz-Anterselva	Relay	1st	Skottheim / Halvarsson / Magnusson / H. Öberg
5	2024–25	16 March 2025	(Slovenia) Pokljuka	Single Mixed Relay	2nd	Skottheim / Jesper Nelin
6	2025-26	14 January 2026	(Germany) Ruhpolding	Relay	3rd	Skottheim / Gestblom / H. Öberg / E. Öberg

*Results are from IBU races which include the Biathlon World Cup, Biathlon World Championships and the Winter Olympic Games.

Updated on 26 January 2025
