= 2020–21 Biathlon World Cup – Stage 9 =

The 2020–21 Biathlon World Cup – Stage 9 was the 9th event of the season and was held in Nové Město, Czech Republic, from 11 to 14 March 2021.

== Schedule of events ==
The events took place at the following times.

Date	Time	Events
11 March	17:30 CET	Men's 10 km Sprint
12 March	17:30 CET	Women's 7.5 km Sprint
13 March	14:45 CET	Men's 12.5 km Pursuit
13 March	17:30 CET	Women's 10 km Pursuit
14 March	10:25 CET	Mixed Relay
14 March	13:45 CET	Single Mixed Relay

== Medal winners ==
=== Men ===
Event:	Gold:	Time	Silver:	Time	Bronze:	Time
10 km Sprint details	Quentin Fillon Maillet; France	22:07.2 (0+0)	Tarjei Bø; Norway	22:18.5 (0+0)	Lukas Hofer; Italy	22:22.0 (0+0)
12.5 km Pursuit details	Quentin Fillon Maillet; France	28:46.7 (1+1+0+0)	Johannes Thingnes Bø; Norway	28:54.7 (1+0+0+1)	Émilien Jacquelin; France	29:01.2 (0+0+1+0)

=== Women ===
Event:	Gold:	Time	Silver:	Time	Bronze:	Time
7.5 km Sprint details	Tiril Eckhoff; Norway	18:11.1 (0+1)	Denise Herrmann; Germany	18:17.2 (0+0)	Dorothea Wierer; Italy	18:21.6 (0+0)
10 km Pursuit details	Tiril Eckhoff; Norway	27:13.6 (0+1+0+0)	Dzinara Alimbekava; Belarus	27:48.2 (0+0+0+0)	Franziska Preuß; Germany	27:53.8 (0+1+0+1)

=== Mixed ===
Event:	Gold:	Time	Silver:	Time	Bronze:	Time
Mixed Relay details	align="right"| 1:01:24.1 (0+0) (0+0) (0+1) (0+0) (0+0) (0+2) (0+1) (0+0)	align="right"| 1:02:32.8 (0+2) (0+2) (0+1) (0+1) (0+2) (0+1) (0+0) (0+1)	align="right"| 1:02:46.8 (0+3) (0+1) (0+1) (0+0) (0+0) (0+1) (0+1) (0+3)			
Single Mixed Relay details	align="right"| 37:41.4 (0+0) (0+3) (0+1) (0+0) (0+1) (0+1) (0+0) (0+1)	align="right"| 37:42.9 (0+0) (0+2) (0+0) (0+1) (0+1) (0+1) (0+1) (0+0)	align="right"| 38:07.5 (0+0) (0+3) (0+0) (0+1) (0+0) (0+1) (0+1) (0+1)			
