= Anna Mąka (biathlete) =

Polish biathlete (born 1992)

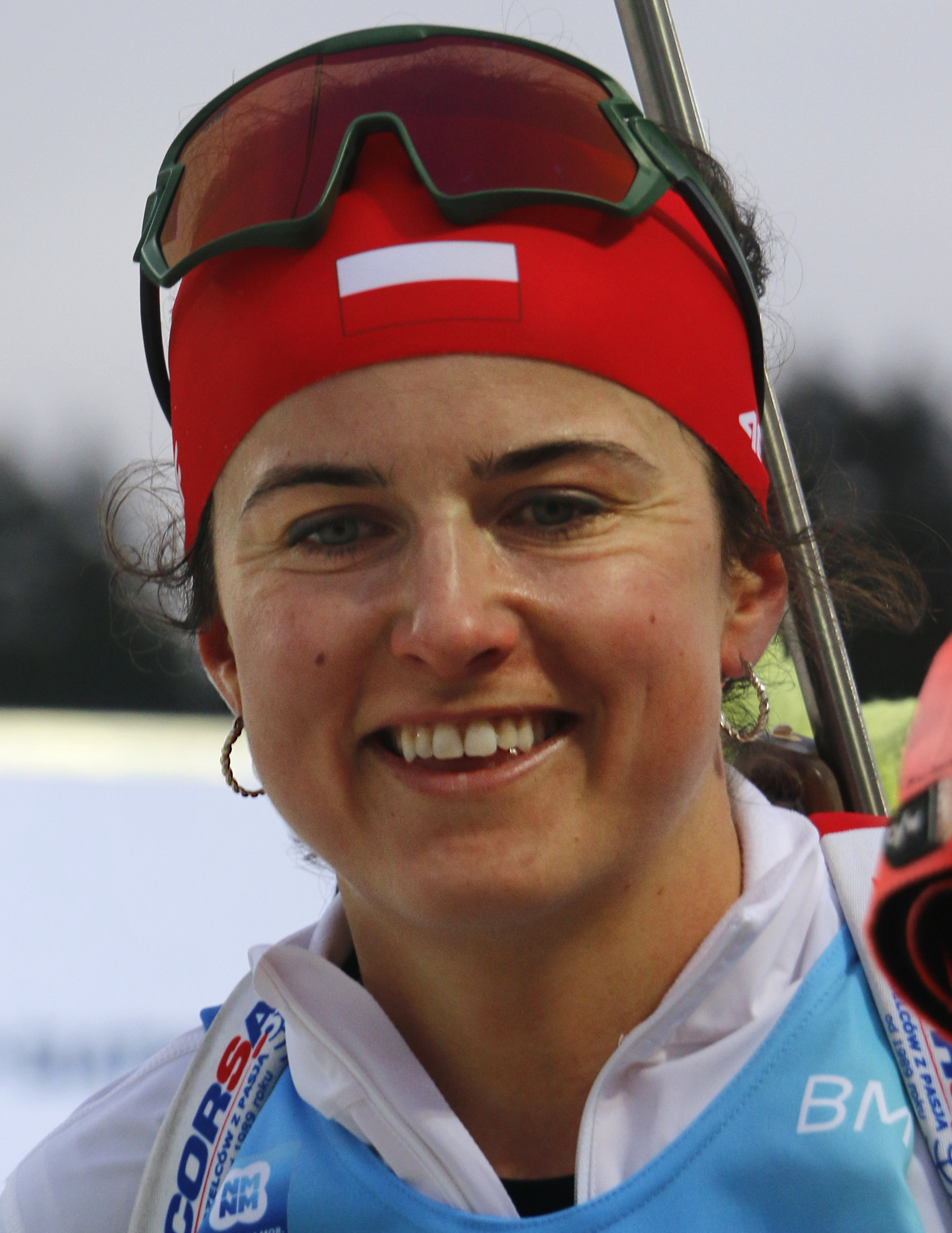
- Mąka in 2023

Personal information
- Born: 22 May 1992 (age 33) Zakopane, Poland

Sport
- Country: Poland
- Sport: Biathlon

Anna Mąka (born 22 May 1992 in Zakopane) is a Polish biathlete. She competed at the 2022 Winter Olympics, in Women's sprint, Women's individual, and Women's relay.

== Career results ==
=== Olympic Games ===
0 medals

Event	Individual	Sprint	Pursuit	Mass start	Relay	Mixed relay
(China) 2022 Beijing	85th	66th	—	—	14th	—
(Italy) 2026 Milano Cortina	45th	45th	40th	—	6th	—

=== World Championships ===
0 medals

Event	Individual	Sprint	Pursuit	Mass start	Relay	Mixed relay	Single mixed relay
(Austria) 2017 Hochfilzen	84th	—	—	—	—	23rd	—
(Slovenia) 2021 Pokljuka	68th	—	—	—	6th	24th	—
(Germany) 2023 Oberhof	31st	54th	55th	—	9th	—	16th
(Czech Republic) 2024 Nové Město na Moravě	36th	46th	55th	—	6th	15th	—
(Switzerland) 2025 Lenzerheide	38th	45th	47th	—	9th	—	—
