= 2020–21 Biathlon World Cup – Stage 4 =

The 2020–21 Biathlon World Cup – Stage 4 was the fourth event of the season and was held in Hochfilzen, Austria, from 17 to 20 December 2020.

== Schedule of events ==
The events took place at the following times.

Date	Time	Events
17 December	14:15 CET	Men's 10 km Sprint
18 December	14:15 CET	Women's 7.5 km Sprint
19 December	13:00 CET	Men's 12.5 km Pursuit
19 December	15:00 CET	Women's 10 km Pursuit
20 December	12:00 CET	Men's 15 km Mass start
20 December	14:25 CET	Women's 12.5 km Mass start

== Podiums ==
=== Men ===
Event:	Gold:	Time	Silver:	Time	Bronze:	Time
10 km Sprint details	Sturla Holm Lægreid; Norway	23:04.9 (0+0)	Johannes Dale; Norway	23:12.8 (0+0)	Johannes Thingnes Bø; Norway	23:24.8 (2+0)
12.5 km Pursuit details	Sturla Holm Lægreid; Norway	31:14.9 (0+0+1+0)	Émilien Jacquelin; France	31:23.4 (1+0+0+0)	Johannes Thingnes Bø; Norway	31:23.8 (0+0+1+0)
15 km Mass start details	Arnd Peiffer; Germany	35:53.3 (0+0+0+0)	Martin Ponsiluoma; Sweden	35:54.6 (1+0+0+0)	Tarjei Bø; Norway	36:02.6 (2+0+1+0)

=== Women ===
Event:	Gold:	Time	Silver:	Time	Bronze:	Time
7.5 km Sprint details	Tiril Eckhoff; Norway	19:38.0 (1+0)	Ingrid Landmark Tandrevold; Norway	19:45.6 (0+0)	Marte Olsbu Røiseland; Norway	20:02.6 (1+0)
10 km Pursuit details	Tiril Eckhoff; Norway	28:24.8 (0+1+0+0)	Hanna Öberg; Sweden	28:47.3 (1+0+1+0)	Elvira Öberg; Sweden	28:52.4 (1+0+0+1)
12.5 km Mass start details	Marte Olsbu Røiseland; Norway	34:05.4 (0+1+0+0)	Tiril Eckhoff; Norway	34:19.4 (0+0+1+0)	Dorothea Wierer; Italy	34:32.3 (0+0+1+0)

== Achievements ==
Best individual performance for all time

Not include World Championships and Olympic Games

- Martin Ponsiluoma (SWE), 2nd place in Mass Start
- Aleksander Fjeld Andersen (NOR), 12th place in Mass Start
- Didier Bionaz (ITA), 19th place in Pursuit
- Anton Dudchenko (UKR), 20th place in Sprint
- Milan Žemlička (CZE), 55th place in Sprint
- Alexandr Mukhin (KAZ), 61st place in Sprint
- Lucas Pitzer (AUT), 99th place in Sprint
- Przemyslaw Pancerz (POL), 107th place in Sprint
- Dastan Deldesh (KAZ), 108th place in Sprint
- Janina Hettich (GER), 10th place in Mass Start
- Elena Kruchinkina (BLR), 12th place in Sprint
- Anastasiia Goreeva (RUS), 24th place in Sprint
- Polona Klemenčič (SLO), 38th place in Sprint
- Tereza Voborníková (CZE), 72nd place in Sprint
- Ukaleq Astri Slettemark (GRL), 83rd place in Sprint
- Anastasia Tolmacheva (ROM), 105th place in Sprint

First individual World Cup race

- Milan Žemlička (CZE), 55th place in Sprint
- Lucas Pitzer (AUT), 99th place in Sprint
- Przemyslaw Pancerz (POL), 107th place in Sprint
- Dastan Deldesh (KAZ), 108th place in Sprint
