= Milan Žemlička =

Czech biathlete (born 1996)

Personal information
- Nationality: Czech Republic
- Born: 20 October 1996 (age 29) Chrudim, Czech Republic
- Height: 1.69 m (5 ft 7 in)

Sport
- Sport: Skiing
- Club: SKP Kornspitz Jablonec

Milan Žemlička (born 20 October 1996) is a Czech biathlete who represented the Czech Republic at the 2022 Winter Olympics.

== Biathlon results ==
All results are sourced from the International Biathlon Union.

=== Olympic Games ===
0 medals

Event	Individual	Sprint	Pursuit	Mass start	Relay	Mixed relay
(South Korea) 2018 Pyeongchang	62nd	—	—	—	—	—

=== World Championships ===
0 medals

Event	Individual	Sprint	Pursuit	Mass start	Relay	Mixed relay	Single mixed relay
(Slovenia) 2021 Pokljuka	25th	—	—	—	—	—	—
