= 2020–21 Biathlon World Cup – Stage 10 =

The 2020–21 Biathlon World Cup – Stage 10 is the 10th event of the season and was held in Östersund, Sweden, from 19 to 21 March 2021. Originally it was scheduled to be held at Oslo-Holmenkollen, Norway, but due to the restrictions, imposed by the Norwegian government due to the COVID-19 pandemic, on 13 February it was announced that the final round will be held at Östersund.

== Schedule of events ==
The events took place at the following times.

Date	Time	Events
19 March	12:30 CET	Women's 7.5 km Sprint
19 March	15:30 CET	Men's 10 km Sprint
20 March	12:15 CET	Women's 10 km Pursuit
20 March	15:15 CET	Men's 12.5 km Pursuit
21 March	13:00 CET	Women's 12.5 km Mass start
21 March	15:30 CET	Men's 15 km Mass start

== Podium results ==
=== Men ===
Event:	Gold:	Time	Silver:	Time	Bronze:	Time
10 km Sprint details	Lukas Hofer; Italy	22:27.1 (0+0)	Sebastian Samuelsson; Sweden	22:31.1 (0+0)	Tarjei Bø; Norway	22:41.5 (0+0)
12.5 km Pursuit details	Sturla Holm Lægreid; Norway	32:40.5 (1+0+1+0)	Johannes Thingnes Bø; Norway	33:03.1 (0+0+0+3)	Lukas Hofer; Italy	33:12.9 (1+0+2+1)
15 km Mass start details	Simon Desthieux; France	35:43.7 (0+1+1+0)	Eduard Latypov; Russia	35:52.6 (0+0+2+0)	Johannes Thingnes Bø; Norway	36:01.2 (1+1+0+1)

=== Women ===
Event:	Gold:	Time	Silver:	Time	Bronze:	Time
7.5 km Sprint details	Tiril Eckhoff; Norway	18:44.6 (0+1)	Dorothea Wierer; Italy	18:47.1 (0+0)	Ingrid Landmark Tandrevold; Norway	18:51.3 (0+0)
10 km Pursuit details	Marte Olsbu Røiseland; Norway	32:54.8 (0+0+2+2)	Tiril Eckhoff; Norway	33:24.1 (1+2+0+1)	Hanna Sola; Belarus	33:38.8 (0+1+3+1)
12.5 km Mass start details	Ingrid Landmark Tandrevold; Norway	34:53.1 (0+1+3+1)	Dzinara Alimbekava; Belarus	35:00.0 (1+2+0+3)	Franziska Preuß; Germany	34:04.2 (0+1+4+1)
