= Elena Kruchinkina =

Belarusian biathlete (born 1995)

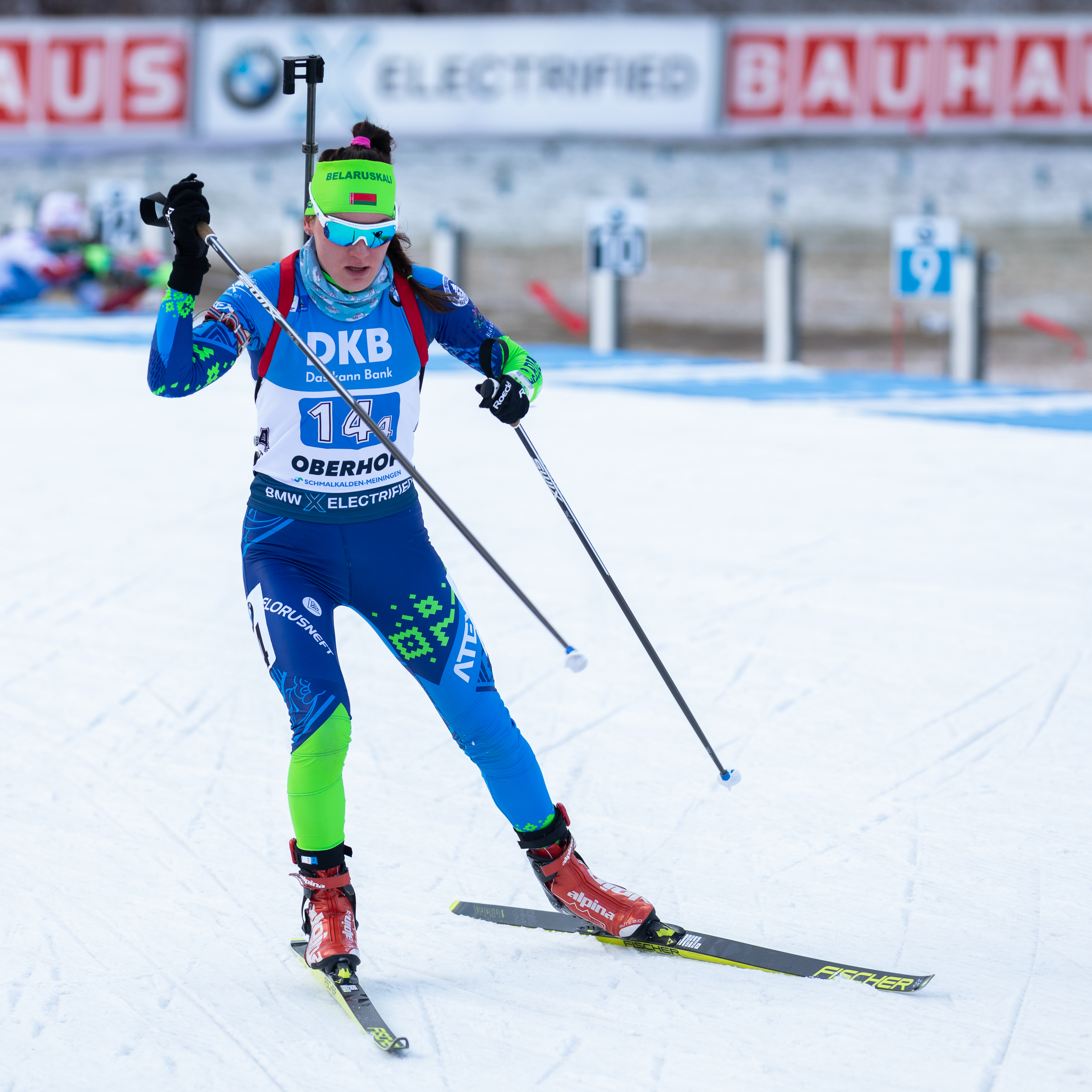
- Kruchinkina in 2020

Personal information
- Nationality: Belarusian
- Born: 28 March 1995 (age 31) Smolniy, Mordovia, Russia

Sport
- Country: Belarus
- Sport: Biathlon

Elena Yuryevna Kruchinkina (Belarusian: Алена Кручынкіна, Russian: Елена Юрьевна Кручинкина, born 28 March 1995) is a Belarusian biathlete. She has competed in the Biathlon World Cup since 2018.

== Biathlon results ==
All results are sourced from the International Biathlon Union.

=== Olympic Games ===
0 medals

Event	Individual	Sprint	Pursuit	Mass start	Relay	Mixed relay
(China) 2022 Beijing	48th	70th	—	—	13th	—

=== World Championships ===
0 medals

Event	Individual	Sprint	Pursuit	Mass start	Relay	Mixed relay	Single mixed relay
(Sweden) 2019 Östersund	46th	36th	44th	—	11th	13th	—
(Italy) 2020 Rasen-Antholz	77th	49th	LAP	—	13th	12th	—
(Slovenia) 2021 Pokljuka	26th	49th	49th	—	4th	14th	—
