= 2020–21 Biathlon World Cup – Stage 3 =

The 2020–21 Biathlon World Cup – Stage 3 was the third event of the season and was held in Hochfilzen, Austria, from 11 to 13 December 2020.

== Schedule of events ==
The events took place at the following times.

Date	Time	Events
11 December	11:30 CET	Women's 7.5 km Sprint
11 December	14:20 CET	Men's 10 km Sprint
12 December	11:45 CET	Women's 4 x 6 km Relay
12 December	14:45 CET	Men's 12.5 km Pursuit
13 December	11:45 CET	Women's 10 km Pursuit
13 December	14:00 CET	Men's 4 x 7.5 km Relay

== Medal winners ==
=== Men ===
Event:	Gold:	Time	Silver:	Time	Bronze:	Time
10 km Sprint details	Johannes Dale; Norway	23:32.5 (0+0)	Quentin Fillon Maillet; France	23:49.6 (0+0)	Fabien Claude; France	24:01.5 (0+1)
12.5 km Pursuit details	Quentin Fillon Maillet; France	32:38.7 (0+0+0+0)	Émilien Jacquelin; France	33:04.2 (0+0+0+0)	Johannes Dale; Norway	33:28.2 (1+0+1+0)
4 x 7.5 km Men Relay details	align="right"| 1:16:31.5 (0+0) (0+2) (0+0) (0+1) (0+0) (0+3) (0+0) (0+2)	align="right"| 1:16:37.2 (0+0) (0+2) (0+1) (0+2) (0+0) (0+2) (0+1) (1+3)	align="right"| 1:17:15.6 (0+1) (0+3) (0+0) (0+0) (0+1) (0+0) (0+2) (0+0)			

=== Women ===
Event:	Gold:	Time	Silver:	Time	Bronze:	Time
7.5 km Sprint details	Dzinara Alimbekava; Belarus	20:12.3 (0+0)	Tiril Eckhoff; Norway	20:20.8 (1+0)	Franziska Preuß; Germany	20:22.2 (0+1)
10 km Pursuit details	Marte Olsbu Røiseland; Norway	29:04.6 (1+0+0+1)	Dzinara Alimbekava; Belarus	29:18.5 (0+0+0+0)	Julia Simon; France	29:22.4 (2+1+0+0)
4 x 6 km Women Relay details	align="right"| 1:08:04.3 (0+0) (0+0) (0+1) (1+3) (0+0) (0+1) (0+0) (0+1)	align="right"| 1:08:28.8 (0+3) (0+3) (0+0) (0+3) (0+2) (0+1) (0+2) (0+2)	align="right"| 1:08:36.8 (0+0) (0+0) (0+0) (0+3) (0+2) (1+3) (0+0) (0+1)			

== Achievements ==
Best individual performance for all time

Not include World Championships and Olympic Games

- Johannes Dale (NOR), 1st place in Sprint
- Olli Hiidensalo (FIN), 18th place in Sprint
- Jaakko Ranta (FIN), 45th place in Sprint
- Edgars Mise (LAT), 72nd place in Sprint
- Oscar Lombardot (FRA), 82nd place in Sprint
- Danil Beletskiy (KAZ), 93rd place in Sprint
- Anatoly Oskin (ROM), 101st place in Sprint
- Ida Lien (NOR), 12th place in Sprint
- Janina Hettich (GER), 12th place in Sprint
- Deedra Irwin (USA), 51st place in Pursuit
- Ekaterina Bekh (UKR), 52nd place in Pursuit
- Sanita Bulina (LAT), 64th place in Sprint
- Joanna Jakieła (POL), 65th place in Sprint
- Eliška Teplá (CZE), 77th place in Sprint
- Sophia Schneider (GER), 80th place in Sprint

First individual World Cup race

- Oscar Lombardot (FRA), 82nd place in Sprint
- Anatoly Oskin (ROM), 101st place in Sprint
- Elena Chirkova (ROM), 91st place in Sprint
- Ukaleq Astri Slettemark (GRL), 96th place in Sprint
- Anastasia Tolmacheva (ROM), 107nd place in Sprint
