= 2020–21 Biathlon World Cup – Stage 1 =

2020–21 Biathlon World Cup Stage

The 2020–21 Biathlon World Cup – Stage 1 was the opening event of the season and is held in Kontiolahti, Finland, from 28 to 29 November 2020.

== Schedule of events ==
The events took place at the following times.

Date	Time	Events
28 November	11:00 CET	Men's 20 km Individual
28 November	14:20 CET	Women's 15 km Individual
29 November	10:30 CET	Men's 10 km Sprint
29 November	13:40 CET	Women's 7.5 km Sprint

== Medal winners ==
=== Men ===
Event:	Gold:	Time	Silver:	Time	Bronze:	Time
20 km Individual	Sturla Holm Lægreid; Norway	48:57.0 (0+0+0+0)	Johannes Thingnes Bø; Norway	49:16.6 (1+0+0+0)	Erik Lesser; Germany	50:00.6 (0+1+0+0)
10 km Sprint	Johannes Thingnes Bø; Norway	23:53.0 (0+0)	Sebastian Samuelsson; Sweden	24:37.1 (1+0)	Martin Ponsiluoma; Sweden	24:40.9 (1+0)

=== Women ===
Event:	Gold:	Time	Silver:	Time	Bronze:	Time
15 km Individual	Dorothea Wierer; Italy	44:00.9 (0+0+0+0)	Denise Herrmann; Germany	44:01.7 (1+0+0+0)	Johanna Skottheim; Sweden	44:25.0 (0+0+0+0)
7.5 km Sprint	Hanna Öberg; Sweden	21:01.4 (0+0)	Marte Olsbu Røiseland; Norway	21:25.3 (0+0)	Karoline Offigstad Knotten; Norway	21:39.2 (0+0)
