= Dunja Zdouc =

Austrian biathlete (born 1994)

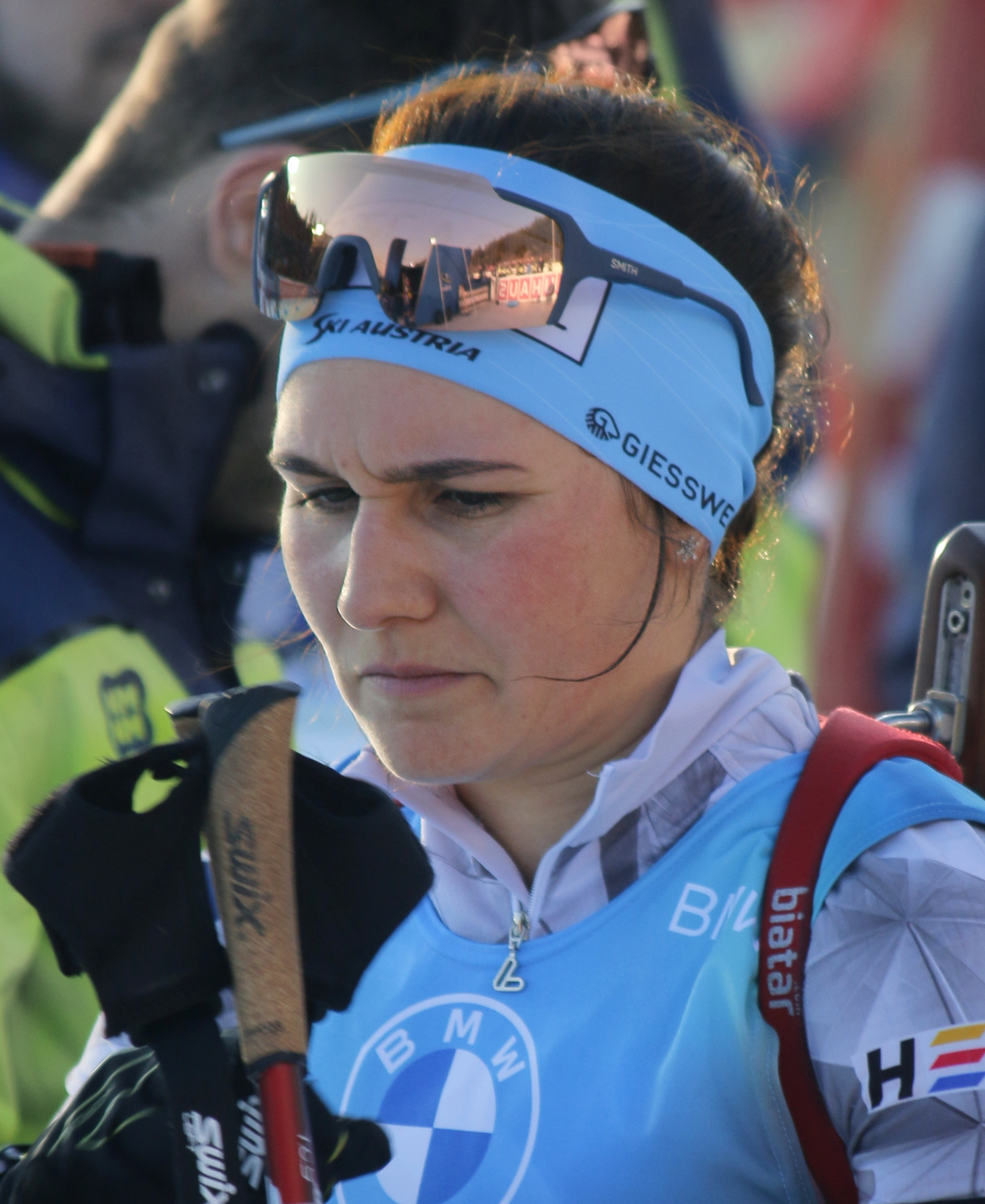

Personal information
- Nationality: Austrian
- Born: 3 January 1994 (age 32) Klagenfurt, Austria
- Height: 1.67 m (5 ft 6 in)
- Weight: 56 kg (123 lb)

Sport

Professional information
- Sport: Biathlon
- Club: DSG Sele Zell
- World Cup debut: 2014

World Championships
- Teams: 5 (2015–2017, 2020–2021)
- Medals: 1 (0 gold)

World Cup
- Seasons: 5 (2014/15–2016/17, 2019/20–2020/21)
- Individual victories: 0
- All victories: 0
- Individual podiums: 0
- All podiums: 1
- Overall titles: 0
- Discipline titles: 0
Medal record
World Championships
Silver medal – second place	2021 Pokljuka	Mixed relay
Junior World Championships
Bronze medal – third place	2014 Presque Isle	3 × 6 km relay
World Military Games
Gold medal – first place	2017 Sochi	Mixed relay

Dunja Zdouc (born 3 January 1994) is an Austrian biathlete. She competed in the 2014/15 World Cup season, and represented Austria at the Biathlon World Championships 2015 in Kontiolahti.

== Career ==
=== Olympic Games ===
0 medals

Event	Individual	Sprint	Pursuit	Mass start	Relay	Mixed relay
(South Korea) 2018 Pyeongchang	58th	48th	58th	—	—	—
(China) 2022 Beijing	—	85th	—	—	9th	—

=== World Championships ===
1 medal (1 silver)

Event	Individual	Sprint	Pursuit	Mass start	Relay	Mixed relay	Single mixed relay
(Finland) 2015 Kontiolahti	30th	17th	22nd	29th	10th	—	—N/a
(Norway) 2016 Oslo Holmenkollen	52nd	58th	28th	—	12th	5th	—N/a
(Austria) 2017 Hochfilzen	11th	47th	42nd	—	DSQ	—	—N/a
(Italy) 2020 Antholz-Anterselva	—	64th	—	—	—	—	—
(Slovenia) 2021 Pokljuka	42nd	38th	11th	—	7th	Silver	—
(Germany) 2023 Oberhof	14th	45th	43rd	—	5th	4th	—

*During Olympic seasons competitions are only held for those events not included in the Olympic program.
**The single mixed relay was added as an event in 2019.
