= 2020–21 Biathlon World Cup – Stage 5 =

The 2020–21 Biathlon World Cup – Stage 5 was the fifth event of the season and was held in Oberhof, Germany, from 8 to 10 January 2021.

== Schedule of events ==
The events took place at the following times.

Date	Time	Events
8 January	11:30 CET	Women's 7.5 km Sprint
8 January	14:15 CET	Men's 10 km Sprint
9 January	12:45 CET	Women's 10 km Pursuit
9 January	14:45 CET	Men's 12.5 km Pursuit
10 January	11:30 CET	Mixed Relay
10 January	14:40 CET	Single Mixed Relay

== Medal winners ==
=== Men ===
Event:	Gold:	Time	Silver:	Time	Bronze:	Time
10 km Sprint details	Johannes Thingnes Bø; Norway	25:12.0 (0+1)	Tarjei Bø; Norway	25:22.8 (0+0)	Sturla Holm Lægreid; Norway	25:33.6 (0+0)
12.5 km Pursuit details	Sturla Holm Lægreid; Norway	32:38.7 (0+1+0+1)	Johannes Dale; Norway	32:17.4 (0+0+0+2)	Tarjei Bø; Norway	32:27.2 (0+0+0+3)

=== Women ===
Event:	Gold:	Time	Silver:	Time	Bronze:	Time
7.5 km Sprint details	Tiril Eckhoff; Norway	23:54.0 (0+0)	Hanna Öberg; Sweden	24:23.6 (0+0)	Lisa Theresa Hauser; Austria	24:34.2 (0+1)
10 km Pursuit details	Tiril Eckhoff; Norway	32:20.9 (0+1+0+1)	Marte Olsbu Røiseland; Norway	32:21.4 (0+0+0+0)	Lisa Theresa Hauser; Austria	33:03.9 (0+0+0+1)

=== Mixed ===
Event:	Gold:	Time	Silver:	Time	Bronze:	Time
Mixed Relay details	align="right"| 1:08:21.7 (0+2) (0+1) (0+0) (0+0) (0+1) (0+2) (0+2) (0+2)	align="right"| 1:08:22.4 (0+0) (0+1) (0+2) (0+1) (0+0) (0+1) (0+1) (0+1)	align="right"| 1:08:33.8 (0+0) (0+0) (0+0) (0+2) (0+2) (0+2) (0+0) (0+0)			
Single Mixed Relay details	align="right"| 39:04.8 (0+0) (0+0) (0+0) (0+0) (0+2) (0+1) (0+0) (0+0)	align="right"| 39:43.5 (0+0) (0+1) (0+0) (0+2) (0+0) (0+1) (0+0) (0+1)	align="right"| 39:48.7 (0+0) (0+0) (0+0) (0+2) (0+0) (3+3) (0+3) (0+0)			

== Achievements ==
Best individual performance for all time

Not include World Championships and Olympic Games

- Raman Yaliotnau (BLR), 10th place in Sprint
- Eduard Latypov (RUS), 11th place in Sprint
- Sivert Guttorm Bakken (NOR), 24th place in Sprint
- Emilien Claude (FRA), 33rd place in Sprint
- Alexandr Mukhin (KAZ), 47th place in Pursuit
- Pavel Magazeev (MLD), 56th place in Pursuit
- Vladislav Kireyev (KAZ), 72nd place in Sprint
- Alex Cisar (SLO), 75th place in Sprint
- Patrick Jakob (AUT), 77th place in Sprint
- Oskar Brandt (SWE), 92nd place in Sprint
- Blagoy Todev (BUL), 94th place in Sprint
- Lisa Theresa Hauser (AUT), 3rd place in Sprint
- Evgeniya Pavlova (RUS), 6th place in Sprint
- Irene Lardschneider (ITA), 45th place in Sprint
- Maria Zdravkova (BUL), 46th place in Sprint
- Natalia Gerbulova (RUS), 87th place in Sprint

First individual World Cup race

- Sivert Guttorm Bakken (NOR), 24th place in Sprint
- Emilien Claude (FRA), 33rd place in Sprint
- Natalia Gerbulova (RUS), 87th place in Sprint
