= 2020–21 Biathlon World Cup – Stage 8 =

The 2020–21 Biathlon World Cup – Stage 8 was the 8th event of the season and was held in Nové Město, Czech Republic, from 4 to 7 March 2021.

== Schedule of events ==
The events took place at the following times.

Date	Time	Events
4 March	16:05 CET	Women's 4 x 6 km Relay
5 March	15:20 CET	Men's 4 x 7.5 km Relay
6 March	11:00 CET	Women's 7.5 km Sprint
6 March	15:40 CET	Men's 10 km Sprint
7 March	12:00 CET	Women's 10 km Pursuit
7 March	16:00 CET	Men's 12.5 km Pursuit

== Medal winners ==
=== Men ===
Event:	Gold:	Time	Silver:	Time	Bronze:	Time
10 km Sprint details	Simon Desthieux; France	22:58.0 (0+0)	Sebastian Samuelsson; Sweden	23:00.4 (0+0)	Arnd Peiffer; Germany	23:02.4 (0+0)
12.5 km Pursuit details	Tarjei Bø; Norway	28:17.3 (1+0+0+0)	Johannes Thingnes Bø; Norway	28:25.5 (2+0+0+0)	Simon Desthieux; France	28:28.8 (0+2+0+0)
4 x 7.5 km Relay details	align="right"| 1:12:28.1 (0+0) (0+2) (0+0) (0+1) (0+0) (0+1) (0+1) (0+0)	align="right"| 1:13:49.8 (0+3) (0+0) (0+0) (0+0) (0+2) (0+3) (0+0) (0+0)	align="right"| 1:14:01.3 (0+0) (0+0) (0+0) (1+3) (0+0) (1+3) (0+0) (1+3)			

=== Women ===
Event:	Gold:	Time	Silver:	Time	Bronze:	Time
7.5 km Sprint details	Tiril Eckhoff; Norway	18:48.4 (1+0)	Yuliia Dzhima; Ukraine	18:57.7 (0+0)	Lisa Vittozzi; Italy	19:03.4 (0+0)
10 km Pursuit details	Tiril Eckhoff; Norway	27:28.0 (0+0+1+2)	Denise Herrmann; Germany	27:52.0 (1+0+0+0)	Marte Olsbu Røiseland; Norway	27:57.9 (0+1+1+1)
4 x 6 km Relay details	align="right"| 1:03:26.6 (0+1) (0+0) (0+2) (0+0) (0+1) (0+0) (0+0) (0+2)	align="right"| 1:03:27.8 (0+0) (0+1) (0+0) (0+1) (0+3) (0+2) (0+1) (0+1)	align="right"| 1:03:54.4 (0+0) (0+1) (0+1) (0+0) (1+3) (0+0) (0+3) (0+0)			
