= 2020–21 Biathlon World Cup – Stage 2 =

The 2020–21 Biathlon World Cup – Stage 2 was the second event of the season and was held in Kontiolahti, Finland, from 3 to 6 December 2020. This event was originally scheduled to be held in Östersund, Sweden, but was rescheduled to Kontiolahti to limit travel in response to the COVID-19 pandemic.

== Schedule of events ==
The events took place at the following times.

| Date | Time | Events |
|---|---|---|
| 3 December | 13:30 CET | Men's 10 km Sprint |
| 3 December | 16:30 CET | Women's 7.5 km Sprint |
| 5 December | 13:20 CET | Men's 12.5 km Pursuit |
| 5 December | 15:15 CET | Women's 4 x 6 km Relay |
| 6 December | 12:45 CET | Men's 4 x 7.5 km Relay |
| 6 December | 15:15 CET | Women's 10 km Pursuit |

== Medal winners ==
=== Men ===
| Event: | Gold: | Time | Silver: | Time | Bronze: | Time |
|---|---|---|---|---|---|---|
| 10 km Sprint details | Tarjei Bø; Norway | 24:03.7 (0+0) | Arnd Peiffer; Germany | 24:17.6 (0+0) | Johannes Thingnes Bø; Norway | 24:33.1 (1+0) |
| 12.5 km Pursuit details | Sebastian Samuelsson; Sweden | 32:26.7 (0+0+0+1) | Fabien Claude; France | 32:42.5 (2+1+0+0) | Johannes Thingnes Bø; Norway | 32:46.2 (0+0+1+2) |
| 4 x 7.5 km Men Relay details | align="right"| 1:16:21.0 (0+0) (0+2) (0+0) (0+2) (0+0) (0+1) (0+3) (0+1) | align="right"| 1:17:00.2 (0+3) (0+1) (0+1) (0+2) (0+1) (0+1) (0+0) (0+1) | align="right"| 1:17:11.7 (0+1) (0+3) (0+0) (0+2) (0+0) (0+1) (0+0) (0+2) | | | |

=== Women ===
| Event: | Gold: | Time | Silver: | Time | Bronze: | Time |
|---|---|---|---|---|---|---|
| 7.5 km Sprint details | Hanna Öberg; Sweden | 21:11.5 (0+0) | Anaïs Chevalier-Bouchet; France | 21:21.1 (0+0) | Elvira Öberg; Sweden | 21:39.4 (0+1) |
| 10 km Pursuit details | Tiril Eckhoff; Norway | 31:05.9 (0+0+0+0) | Marte Olsbu Røiseland; Norway | 31:27.4 (0+0+1+1) | Hanna Öberg; Sweden | 31:41.3 (0+1+1+1) |
| 4 x 6 km Women Relay details | align="right"| 1:12:44.5 (0+0) (0+2) (0+1) (0+1) (0+1) (0+2) (0+0) (0+1) | align="right"| 1:12:54.1 (0+0) (0+3) (0+0) (0+1) (0+0) (0+2) (0+0) (0+3) | align="right"| 1:13:28.4 (0+0) (0+2) (0+1) (0+3) (0+2) (0+2) (0+0) (0+2) | | | |

== Achievements ==
Best individual performance for all time

Not include World Championships and Olympic Games

- Sergey Bocharnikov (BLR), 13th place in Sprint
- Maksim Varabei (BLR), 19th place in Sprint
- Linas Banys (LTU), 66th place in Sprint
- Pavel Magazeev (MDA), 68th place in Sprint
- Matej Baloga (SVK), 84th place in Sprint
- Wojciech Skorusa (POL), 88th place in Sprint
- Blagoy Todev (BUL), 97th place in Sprint
- Andrei Usov (MDA), 102nd place in Sprint
- Elvira Öberg (SWE), 3rd place in Sprint
- Irina Kazakevich (RUS), 13th place in Sprint
- Irene Lardschneider (ITA), 46th place in Sprint
- Ekaterina Bekh (UKR), 63rd place in Sprint
- Annija Keita Sabule (LAT), 69th place in Sprint
- Tereza Voborníková (CZE), 76th place in Sprint
- Darya Sepandj (CAN), 86th place in Sprint
- Joanna Jakieła (POL), 90th place in Sprint
- Aneta Smerčiaková (SVK), 100th place in Sprint
- Alina Stremous (MDA), 102nd place in Sprint

First individual World Cup race

- Pavel Magazeev (MDA), 68th place in Sprint
- Andrei Usov (MDA), 102nd place in Sprint
- Darya Sepandj (CAN), 86th place in Sprint
- Aneta Smerčiaková (SVK), 100th place in Sprint
- Alina Stremous (MDA), 102nd place in Sprint
