= Dzinara Smolskaya =

Belarusian biathlete (born 1996)

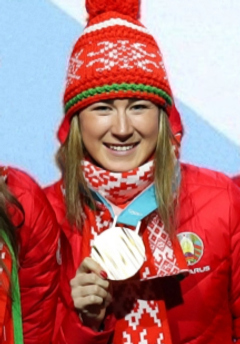
- Alimbekava at the 2018 Olympics

Personal information
- Native name: Динара Талғатқызы Әлімбекова
- Nationality: Belarusian
- Born: Dzinara Talhatauna Alimbekava; 5 January 1996 (age 30) Abay, Kazakhstan
- Height: 172 cm (5 ft 8 in)
- Weight: 60 kg (132 lb)

Sport
- Sport: Biathlon
Medal record
Representing Belarus
Olympic Games
Gold medal – first place	2018 Pyeongchang	4 × 6 km relay
European Championships
Bronze medal – third place	2019 Raubichi	Mixed relay
Youth World Championships
Gold medal – first place	2015 Raubichi	3 × 6 km relay

Dzinara Smolskaya (née Dzinara Talhatauna Alimbekava, Kazakh: Динара Талғатқызы Әлімбекова, romanized: Dinara Talğatkyzy Älimbekova, born 5 January 1996) is a Kazakhstan-born Belarusian biathlete. She won a gold medal in the 4×6 km relay at the 2018 Olympics. Alimbekava won her first IBU World Cup competition (a sprint) in Hochfilzen, Austria, in December 2020, and finished as the Under-25 Cup leader for the 2020-21 World Cup season.

Alimbekava was born in Kazakhstan to a Kazakh father and a Belarusian mother. When she was three years old, her family moved to Belarus, where her younger brother Zhenya was born. Dzinara is professionally trained in piano and skates and practices snowboarding in her free time.

In October 2022, Alimbekava revealed, via her Instagram account, that she had married fellow biathlete Anton Smolski on 10 January that year. She now competes under the name Dzinara Smolskaya.

== Biathlon results ==
All results are sourced from the International Biathlon Union.

=== Olympic Games ===
1 medal (1 gold)

Event	Individual	Sprint	Pursuit	Mass start	Relay	Mixed relay
(South Korea) 2018 Pyeongchang	56th	—	—	—	Gold	—
(China) 2022 Beijing	5th	15th	19th	12th	13th	6th

=== World Championships ===
0 medals

Event	Individual	Sprint	Pursuit	Mass start	Relay	Mixed relay	Single mixed relay
(Sweden) 2019 Östersund	85th	13th	35th	—	11th	—	—
(Italy) 2020 Antholz	—	72nd	—	—	13th	—	—
(Slovenia) 2021 Pokljuka	17th	40th	21st	26th	4th	14th	—

*During Olympic seasons competitions are only held for those events not included in the Olympic program.
**The single mixed relay was added as an event in 2019.

=== World Cup ===
==== Individual podiums ====
- 1 victories (1 Sp)
- 6 podiums (1 Sp, 3 Pu, 2 Ms)

No.	Season	Date	Location	Level	Race	Place
1	2020–21	11 December 2020	(Austria) Hochfilzen	World Cup	Sprint	1st
2	2020–21	13 December 2020	(Austria) Hochfilzen	World Cup	Pursuit	2nd
3	2020–21	13 March 2021	(Czech Republic) Nové Město na Moravě	World Cup	Pursuit	2nd
4	2020–21	21 March 2021	(Sweden) Östersund	World Cup	Mass Start	2nd
5	2021–22	9 January 2022	(Germany) Oberhof	World Cup	Pursuit	3rd
6	2021–22	23 January 2022	(Italy) Antholz-Anterselva	World Cup	Mass Start	2nd
