= 2020–21 Biathlon World Cup – Stage 7 =

The 2020–21 Biathlon World Cup – Stage 7 was the 7th event of the season and was held in Antholz-Anterselva, Italy, from 21 to 24 January 2021.

== Schedule of events ==
The events took place at the following times.

Date	Time	Events
21 January	14:15 CET	Women's 15 km Individual
22 January	13:15 CET	Men's 20 km Individual
23 January	13:10 CET	Women's 12.5 km Mass Start
23 January	15:05 CET	Men's 4 x 7.5 km Relay
24 January	12:45 CET	Women's 4 x 6 km Relay
24 January	15:05 CET	Men's 15 km Mass Start

== Medal winners ==
=== Men ===
Event:	Gold:	Time	Silver:	Time	Bronze:	Time
20 km Individual details	Alexander Loginov; Russia	48:41.8 (0+0+0+0)	Sturla Holm Lægreid; Norway	49:40.3 (0+1+1+0)	Quentin Fillon Maillet; France	49:52.4 (0+0+1+1)
15 km Mass Start details	Johannes Thingnes Bø; Norway	35:44.3 (0+0+0+1)	Quentin Fillon Maillet; France	36:15.6 (1+0+0+1)	Jakov Fak; Slovenia	36:28.5 (0+0+1+0)
4 x 7.5 km Relay details	align="right"| 1:14:25.8 (0+2) (0+1) (0+1) (0+3) (0+0) (0+1) (0+1) (0+0)	align="right"| 1:14:26.6 (0+2) (0+0) (0+1) (1+3) (0+1) (0+1) (0+0) (0+1)	align="right"| 1:15:16.6 (0+0) (0+0) (0+0) (0+1) (0+0) (1+3) (0+0) (0+3)			

=== Women ===
Event:	Gold:	Time	Silver:	Time	Bronze:	Time
15 km Individual details	Lisa Theresa Hauser; Austria	42:29.3 (0+0+1+0)	Yuliia Dzhima; Ukraine	43:13.0 (0+0+0+0)	Anaïs Chevalier-Bouchet; France	43:33.3 (0+0+0+1)
12.5 km Mass Start details	Julia Simon; France	37:05.5 (1+1+1+0)	Hanna Öberg; Sweden	37:05.7 (0+0+1+0)	Lisa Theresa Hauser; Austria	37:09.0 (0+0+1+0)
4 x 6 km Relay details	align="right"| 1:07:32.4 (0+1) (0+3) (0+0) (0+1) (0+1) (0+1) (0+0) (0+2)	align="right"| 1:07:43.4 (0+1) (0+0) (0+0) (0+1) (0+1) (0+2) (0+0) (0+1)	align="right"| 1:07:53.6 (0+0) (1+3) (0+0) (0+0) (0+2) (0+2) (0+1) (0+1)			

== Achievements ==
Best individual performance for all time

Not include World Championships and Olympic Games

- Anton Dudchenko (UKR), 5th place in Individual
- Didier Bionaz (ITA), 13th place in Individual
- Kosuke Ozaki (JPN), 24th place in Individual
- Alex Cisar (SLO), 36th place in Individual
- Milan Žemlička (CZE), 39th place in Individual
- Adam Runnalls (CAN), 41st place in Individual
- Raul Antonio Flore (ROM), 42nd place in Individual
- Robert Heldna (EST), 87th place in Individual
- Danil Beletskiy (KAZ), 92nd place in Individual
- Lisa Theresa Hauser (AUT), 1st place in Individual
- Janina Hettich (GER), 5th place in Individual
- Dunja Zdouc (AUT), 10th place in Individual
- Marion Deigentesch (GER), 11th place in Individual
- Anna Mąka (POL), 26th place in Individual
- Henrieta Horváthová (SVK), 52nd place in Individual
- Ana Larisa Cotrus (ROM), 88th place in Individual
- Aneta Smerčiaková (SVK), 90th place in Individual

First individual World Cup race

- Ilia Gavrilov (RUS), 91st place in Individual
- Pjotr Dielen (BEL), 96th place in Individual
- Tilda Johansson (SWE), 59th place in Individual
