= 2020–21 Biathlon World Cup – Stage 6 =

The 2020–21 Biathlon World Cup – Stage 6 was the sixth event of the season and was held in Oberhof, Germany, from 13 to 17 January 2021.

== Schedule of events ==
The events took place at the following times.

Date	Time	Events
13 January	14:30 CET	Men's 10 km Sprint
14 January	14:30 CET	Women's 7.5 km Sprint
15 January	14:30 CET	Men's 4 x 7.5 km Relay
16 January	14:45 CET	Women's 4 x 6 km Relay
17 January	12:30 CET	Men's 15 km Mass Start
17 January	15:00 CET	Women's 12.5 km Mass Start

== Medal winners ==
=== Men ===
Event:	Gold:	Time	Silver:	Time	Bronze:	Time
10 km Sprint details	Johannes Thingnes Bø; Norway	24:43.6 (0+0)	Sturla Holm Lægreid; Norway	24:56.0 (0+0)	Arnd Peiffer; Germany	25:11.5 (0+0)
15 km Mass Start details	Tarjei Bø; Norway	37:41.9 (0+0+0+1)	Felix Leitner; Austria	37:45.5 (0+0+0+0)	Benjamin Weger; Switzerland	37:49.7 (0+0+0+0)
4 x 7.5 km Relay details	align="right"| 1:22:28.0 (0+1) (0+1) (0+0) (0+0) (0+1) (0+1) (0+1) (0+1)	align="right"| 1:22:32.2 (0+0) (0+1) (1+3) (0+0) (0+0) (0+0) (0+0) (0+0)	align="right"| 1:23:34.6 (0+0) (0+1) (0+0) (0+0) (0+2) (0+0) (0+0) (0+2)			

=== Women ===
Event:	Gold:	Time	Silver:	Time	Bronze:	Time
7.5 km Sprint details	Tiril Eckhoff; Norway	22:33.8 (0+1)	Dorothea Wierer; Italy	22:43.1 (0+0)	Lisa Theresa Hauser; Austria	22:46.4 (0+0)
12.5 km Mass Start details	Julia Simon; France	40:11.1 (0+1+2+0)	Franziska Preuß; Germany	40:15.0 (1+0+1+0)	Hanna Öberg; Sweden	40:22.8 (1+0+1+1)
4 x 6 km Relay details	align="right"| 1:14:31.5 (0+0) (0+0) (0+0) (0+3) (0+1) (0+1) (0+0) (0+0)	align="right"| 1:14:48.9 (0+1) (0+1) (0+2) (0+0) (0+2) (0+1) (0+0) (0+2)	align="right"| 1:15:07.2 (0+0) (0+0) (0+0) (0+1) (0+3) (0+1) (0+0) (0+0)			
