= Biathlon World Championships 2023 – Mixed relay =

Mixed relay at the Biathlon World Championships 2023
- Location: Oberhof, Germany
- Dates: 8 February
- Competitors: 104 from 26 nations
- Teams: 26
- Winning time: 1:04:41.9

Medalists
gold medal	Ingrid Landmark Tandrevold; Marte Olsbu Røiseland; Sturla Holm Lægreid; Johannes Thingnes Bø	Norway
silver medal	Lisa Vittozzi; Dorothea Wierer; Didier Bionaz; Tommaso Giacomel	Italy
bronze medal	Julia Simon; Anaïs Chevalier-Bouchet; Émilien Jacquelin; Quentin Fillon Maillet	France

The 4 × 6 km mixed relay competition at the Biathlon World Championships 2023 was held on 8 February 2023.

== Results ==
The race was started at 14:45.

Rank	Bib	Team	Time	Penalties (P+S)	Deficit
1st place, gold medalist(s)	6	Norway; Ingrid Landmark Tandrevold; Marte Olsbu Røiseland; Sturla Holm Lægreid; Johannes Thingnes Bø	1:04:41.9; 17:23.1; 17:35.2; 14:45.7; 14:57.9	0+3 1+6; 0+0 1+3; 0+0 0+2; 0+0 0+0; 0+3 0+1	
2nd place, silver medalist(s)	2	Italy; Lisa Vittozzi; Dorothea Wierer; Didier Bionaz; Tommaso Giacomel	1:04:53.5; 16:37.5; 17:30.8; 15:43.8; 15:01.4	0+1 0+5; 0+0 0+1; 0+0 0+1; 0+1 0+2; 0+0 0+1	+11.6
3rd place, bronze medalist(s)	1	France; Julia Simon; Anaïs Chevalier-Bouchet; Émilien Jacquelin; Quentin Fillon Maillet	1:05:37.8; 16:27.8; 17:46.8; 15:30.1; 15:53.1	0+7 0+2; 0+1 0+0; 0+1 0+0; 0+2 0+2; 0+3 0+0	+55.9
4	9	Austria; Dunja Zdouc; Lisa Theresa Hauser; David Komatz; Simon Eder	1:05:41.1; 17:31.3; 17:27.3; 15:12.3; 15:30.2	0+2 0+1; 0+1 0+0; 0+1 0+0; 0+0 0+1; 0+0 0+0	+59.2
5	7	Czech Republic; Tereza Voborníková; Markéta Davidová; Michal Krčmář; Tomáš Mikyska	1:05:51.3; 17:16.0; 17:47.4; 15:07.4; 15:40.5	0+4 0+3; 0+2 0+1; 0+1 0+1; 0+1 0+0; 0+0 0+1	+1:09.4
6	5	Germany; Vanessa Voigt; Denise Herrmann-Wick; Benedikt Doll; Roman Rees	1:06:08.4; 17:28.5; 17:06.7; 16:04.2; 15:29.0	1+6 0+3; 0+1 0+1; 0+0 0+1; 1+3 0+1; 0+2 0+0	+1:26.5
7	4	Switzerland; Elisa Gasparin; Lena Häcki-Gross; Sebastian Stalder; Niklas Hartweg	1:06:31.4; 17:33.1; 17:29.2; 15:42.5; 15:46.6	0+1 0+4; 0+0 0+2; 0+0 0+2; 0+0 0+0; 0+1 0+0	+1:49.5
8	21	Canada; Emma Lunder; Nadia Moser; Adam Runnalls; Christian Gow	1:07:04.7; 16:43.8; 18:36.6; 15:56.7; 15:47.6	0+5 0+4; 0+0 0+0; 0+3 0+2; 0+0 0+2; 0+2 0+0	+2:22.8
9	3	Sweden; Hanna Öberg; Elvira Öberg; Martin Ponsiluoma; Sebastian Samuelsson	1:07:15.7; 16:53.6; 17:42.2; 15:22.9; 17:17.0	3+9 0+6; 0+2 0+0; 0+1 0+2; 0+3 0+1; 3+3 0+3	+2:33.8
10	11	Ukraine; Anastasiya Merkushyna; Yuliia Dzhima; Dmytro Pidruchnyi; Anton Dudchenko	1:07:27.2; 17:33.2; 18:00.3; 16:01.1; 15:52.6	0+2 0+5; 0+0 0+0; 0+0 0+1; 0+1 0+3; 0+1 0+1	+2:45.3
11	15	Finland; Suvi Minkkinen; Mari Eder; Tuomas Harjula; Olli Hiidensalo	1:07:34.1; 17:35.7; 18:22.4; 15:41.1; 15:54.9	0+5 0+3; 0+1 0+0; 0+2 0+2; 0+0 0+1; 0+2 0+0	+2:52.2
12	12	Slovenia; Lena Repinc; Polona Klemenčič; Miha Dovžan; Rok Tršan	1:07:51.5; 17:26.8; 18:16.1; 16:11.4; 15:57.2	0+4 0+3; 0+0 0+0; 0+2 0+0; 0+1 0+3; 0+1 0+0	+3:09.6
13	13	United States; Deedra Irwin; Joanne Reid; Paul Schommer; Sean Doherty	1:07:51.9; 17:24.2; 19:00.1; 15:47.0; 15:40.6	0+1 1+5; 0+0 0+0; 0+0 1+3; 0+0 0+2; 0+1 0+0	+3:10.0
14	10	Belgium; Lotte Lie; Maya Cloetens; Thierry Langer; Florent Claude	1:08:42.9; 17:30.7; 18:52.5; 16:07.1; 16:12.6	0+3 0+3; 0+0 0+0; 0+1 0+2; 0+1 0+0; 0+1 0+1	+4:01.0
15	17	Estonia; Susan Külm; Tuuli Tomingas; Kristo Siimer; Rene Zahkna	1:09:00.6; 18:21.4; 18:29.0; 15:49.0; 16:21.2	0+3 0+3; 0+2 0+1; 0+1 0+0; 0+0 0+1; 0+0 0+1	+4:01.0
16	14	Slovakia; Paulína Bátovská Fialková; Mária Remeňová; Michal Šíma; Matej Kazár	1:09:00.9; 16:42.6; 19:22.0; 16:09.9; 16:46.4	0+2 0+3; 0+2 0+3; 0+1 0+2; 0+0 0+1; 0+1 0+0	+4:19.0
17	16	Bulgaria; Milena Todorova; Valentina Dimitrova; Vladimir Iliev; Blagoy Todev	1:09:16.0; 18:11.0; 18:42.6; 15:44.1; 16:38.3	0+4 1+7; 0+0 1+3; 0+2 0+0; 0+1 0+1; 0+1 0+3	+4:34.1
18	20	Lithuania; Natalija Kočergina; Gabrielė Leščinskaitė; Karol Dombrovski; Vytautas Strolia	1:09:34.5; 18:16.0; 19:05.3; 16:18.5; 15:54.7	0+4 0+2; 0+1 0+0; 0+2 0+1; 0+1 0+1; 0+0 0+0	+4:52.6
19	25	Japan; Fuyuko Tachizaki; Aoi Sato; Mikito Tachizaki; Kiyomasa Ojima	1:10:39.1; 17:05.2; 19:23.0; 16:29.9; 17:41.0	0+8 1+5; 0+1 0+0; 0+1 0+2; 0+3 0+0; 0+3 1+3	+5:57.2
20	22	Romania; Elena Chirkova; Anastasia Tolmacheva; George Buta; Raul Flore	1:10:40.4; 18:44.8; 19:03.5; 16:05.5; 16:46.6	0+3 1+7; 0+0 1+3; 0+1 0+2; 0+0 0+0; 0+2 0+2	+5:58.5
21	19	South Korea; Ko Eun-jung; Ekaterina Avvakumova; Timofey Lapshin; Choi Du-jin	LAP; 19:40.1; 18:17.4; 15:35.5	0+2 1+5; 0+0 1+3; 0+1 0+1; 0+1 0+1	
22	8	Poland; Joanna Jakieła; Kamila Żuk; Andrzej Nędza-Kubiniec; Marcin Zawół	LAP; 18:18.5; 18:47.1	0+3 0+3; 0+0 0+1; 0+1 0+1; 0+2 0+1	
23	18	Moldova; Alla Ghilenko; Alina Stremous; Mihail Usov; Pavel Magazeev	LAP; 19:08.6; 18:28.6	2+7 0+3; 0+1 0+0; 0+3 0+0; 2+3 0+3	
24	26	China; Wen Ying; Chu Yuanmeng; Yan Xingyuan; Zhang Chunyu	LAP; 18:50.4	0+1 0+1; 0+1 0+0; 0+0 0+1	
25	23	Latvia; Annija Sabule; Baiba Bendika; Aleksandrs Patrijuks; Edgars Mise	LAP; 20:18.5	0+5 0+2; 0+3 0+1; 0+2 0+1	
26	24	Kazakhstan; Anastassiya Kondratyeva; Lyudmila Akhatova; Alexandr Mukhin; Vladislav Kireyev	LAP; 20:15.1	0+5 0+4; 0+3 0+2; 0+2 0+2	
