= Biathlon World Championships 2024 – Single mixed relay =

Single mixed relay at the Biathlon World Championships 2024
- Venue: Vysočina Arena
- Location: Nové Město na Moravě, Czech Republic
- Dates: 15 February
- Competitors: 56 from 28 nations
- Teams: 28
- Winning time: 36:21.7

Medalists
gold medal	Quentin Fillon Maillet; Lou Jeanmonnot	France
silver medal	Tommaso Giacomel; Lisa Vittozzi	Italy
bronze medal	Johannes Thingnes Bø; Ingrid Landmark Tandrevold	Norway

The Single mixed relay competition at the Biathlon World Championships 2024 was held on 15 February 2024.

Team Norway was the defending champion. The team did not defend the title and ultimately lost to the French and Italian teams.

== Results ==
The race was started at 18:00.

Rank	Bib	Team	Time	Penalties (P+S)	Deficit
1st place, gold medalist(s)	5	France; Quentin Fillon Maillet; Lou Jeanmonnot; Quentin Fillon Maillet; Lou Jeanmonnot	36:21.7; 7:38.9; 8:25.8; 7:56.9; 12:20.1	0+0 0+3; 0+0 0+0; 0+0 0+0; 0+0 0+2; 0+0 0+1	
2nd place, silver medalist(s)	6	Italy; Tommaso Giacomel; Lisa Vittozzi; Tommaso Giacomel; Lisa Vittozzi	36:46.3; 8:06.0; 8:30.4; 7:46.7; 12:23.2	0+3 0+2; 0+2 0+2; 0+0 0+0; 0+0 0+0; 0+1 0+0	+24.6
3rd place, bronze medalist(s)	1	Norway; Johannes Thingnes Bø; Ingrid Landmark Tandrevold; Johannes Thingnes Bø; Ingrid Landmark Tandrevold	36:49.1; 7:42.9; 8:36.3; 7:41.4; 12:48.5	0+1 1+6; 0+1 0+1; 0+0 0+0; 0+0 0+2; 0+0 1+3	+27.4
4	3	Sweden; Sebastian Samuelsson; Hanna Öberg; Sebastian Samuelsson; Hanna Öberg	37:22.6; 8:06.8; 8:45.2; 7:58.4; 12:32.3	0+5 1+7; 0+0 0+3; 0+2 0+1; 0+2 0+0; 0+1 1+3	+1:00.9
5	10	Switzerland; Niklas Hartweg; Lena Häcki-Groß; Niklas Hartweg; Lena Häcki-Groß	37:22.8; 7:49.7; 8:59.2; 7:57.4; 12:36.5	0+2 0+4; 0+0 0+0; 0+1 0+1; 0+0 0+1; 0+2 0+1	+1:01.1
6	2	Germany; Justus Strelow; Vanessa Voigt; Justus Strelow; Vanessa Voigt	37:26.3; 7:58.1; 8:44.4; 7:56.5; 12:47.3	0+0 0+4; 0+0 0+1; 0+0 0+0; 0+0 0+0; 0+0 0+3	+1:04.6
7	11	United States; Campbell Wright; Deedra Irwin; Campbell Wright; Deedra Irwin	37:29.0; 7:50.2; 8:56.0; 7:53.7; 12:49.1	0+2 0+2; 0+0 0+0; 0+1 0+1; 0+0 0+1; 0+1 0+0	+1:07.3
8	9	Latvia; Andrejs Rastorgujevs; Baiba Bendika; Andrejs Rastorgujevs; Baiba Bendika	37:32.6; 8:00.1; 9:13.7; 7:53.9; 12:24.9	0+5 0+1; 0+0 0+0; 0+3 0+1; 0+0 0+0; 0+2 0+0	+1:10.9
9	4	Austria; Simon Eder; Lisa Theresa Hauser; Simon Eder; Lisa Theresa Hauser	37:42.7; 7:50.4; 9:12.6; 8:01.1; 12:38.6	0+2 0+2; 0+0 0+0; 0+2 0+2; 0+0 0+0; 0+0 0+0	+1:21.0
10	14	Czech Republic; Jonáš Mareček; Markéta Davidová; Jonáš Mareček; Markéta Davidová	37:55.4; 8:29.1; 8:40.1; 8:14.3; 12:31.9	0+5 1+5; 0+2 1+3; 0+1 0+0; 0+2 0+1; 0+0 0+1	+1:33.7
11	13	Estonia; Rene Zahkna; Susan Külm; Rene Zahkna; Susan Külm	38:03.4; 8:17.9; 8:50.5; 7:53.3; 13:01.7	0+6 0+3; 0+2 0+2; 0+1 0+0; 0+0 0+0; 0+3 0+1	+1:41.7
12	8	Finland; Otto Invenius; Suvi Minkkinen; Otto Invenius; Suvi Minkkinen	38:07.0; 7:55.8; 8:48.5; 8:25.1; 12:57.6	0+2 1+5; 0+0 0+1; 0+1 0+0; 0+0 1+3; 0+1 0+1	+1:45.3
13	17	Poland; Marcin Zawół; Natalia Sidorowicz; Marcin Zawół; Natalia Sidorowicz	38:42.1; 8:28.0; 8:40.0; 8:20.3; 13:13.8	0+6 0+1; 0+3 0+0; 0+0 0+0; 0+1 0+1; 0+2 0+0	+2:20.4
14	12	Ukraine; Dmytro Pidruchnyi; Anastasiya Merkushyna; Dmytro Pidruchnyi; Anastasiya Merkushyna	38:47.7; 8:09.2; 9:35.1; 8:16.3; 12:47.1	0+6 0+6; 0+2 0+1; 0+3 0+3; 0+0 0+2; 0+1 0+0	+2:26.0
15	21	South Korea; Timofey Lapshin; Ekaterina Avvakumova; Timofey Lapshin; Ekaterina Avvakumova	38:57.9; 8:03.7; 9:34.3; 8:00.2; 13:19.7	0+6 0+2; 0+3 0+0; 0+2 0+1; 0+0 0+0; 0+1 0+1	+2:36.2
16	27	Belgium; Florent Claude; Lotte Lie; Florent Claude; Lotte Lie	39:08.8; 8:19.6; 8:58.8; 8:13.6; 13:36.8	0+4 0+8; 0+1 0+2; 0+0 0+1; 0+0 0+2; 0+3 0+3	+2:47.1
17	23	Bulgaria; Blagoy Todev; Valentina Dimitrova; Blagoy Todev; Valentina Dimitrova	39:12.1; 8:02.4; 9:14.3; 8:14.4; 13:41.0	1+5 0+3; 0+0 0+0; 0+0 0+2; 0+2 0+0; 1+3 0+1	+2:50.4
18	7	Slovenia; Jakov Fak; Polona Klemenčič; Jakov Fak; Polona Klemenčič	39:27.1; 7:59.5; 10:16.5; 8:03.7; 13:07.4	1+3 1+6; 0+0 0+2; 1+3 1+3; 0+0 0+1; 0+0 0+0	+3:05.4
19	15	Moldova; Maksim Makarov; Alla Ghilenko; Maksim Makarov; Alla Ghilenko	39:28.8; 7:56.9; 9:09.8; 8:37.2; 13:44.9	0+6 0+4; 0+0 0+1; 0+3 0+0; 0+1 0+2; 0+2 0+1	+3:07.1
20	20	Romania; Dmitrii Shamaev; Anastasia Tolmacheva; Dmitrii Shamaev; Anastasia Tolmacheva	39:41.9; 7:56.2; 9:17.1; 8:32.4; 13:56.2	0+6 1+4; 0+0 0+0; 0+3 0+0; 0+2 0+1; 0+1 1+3	+3:20.2
21	16	Canada; Adam Runnalls; Emma Lunder; Adam Runnalls; Emma Lunder	39:56.2; 8:51.7; 9:43.4; 8:14.6; 13:06.5	1+5 0+2; 1+3 0+0; 0+2 0+1; 0+0 0+1; 0+0 0+0	+3:34.5
22	18	Slovakia; Tomáš Sklenárik; Mária Remenová; Tomáš Sklenárik; Mária Remenová	40:03.6; 8:48.4; 9:26.1; 8:05.3; 13:43.8	1+6 0+5; 1+3 0+1; 0+2 0+1; 0+0 0+0; 0+1 0+3	+3:41.9
23	22	Kazakhstan; Alexandr Mukhin; Galina Vishnevskaya-Sheporenko; Alexandr Mukhin; Galina Vishnevskaya-Sheporenko	40:42.1; 8:24.2; 9:49.5; 8:20.6; 14:07.8	0+6 0+4; 0+2 0+0; 0+1 1+3; 0+2 0+0; 0+1 0+1	+4:20.4
24	19	Lithuania; Vytautas Strolia; Natalja Kočergina; Vytautas Strolia; Natalja Kočergina	LAP; 8:09.9; 10:25.1; 8:33.7	5+7 0+4; 0+1 0+0; 2+3 0+3; 0+2 0+1; 3+3	
25	24	Croatia; Krešimir Crnković; Anika Kozica; Krešimir Crnković; Anika Kozica	LAP; 9:19.0; 9:25.6	1+6 0+4; 1+3 0+2; 0+0 0+2; 0+3	
26	25	Japan; Mikito Tachizaki; Aoi Sato; Mikito Tachizaki; Aoi Sato	LAP; 8:51.6	0+5 1+4; 0+2 0+1; 0+3 1+3	
27	26	Australia; Noah Bradford; Darcie Morton; Noah Bradford; Darcie Morton	LAP; 10:08.2	0+4 1+4; 0+3 1+3; 0+1 0+1	
28	28	Greece; Apostolos Angelis; Konstantina Charalampidou; Apostolos Angelis; Konstantina Charalampidou	LAP; 9:29.7	0+5 0+3; 0+3 0+3; 0+2	
