= Biathlon World Championships 2023 – Single mixed relay =

Single mixed relay at the Biathlon World Championships 2023
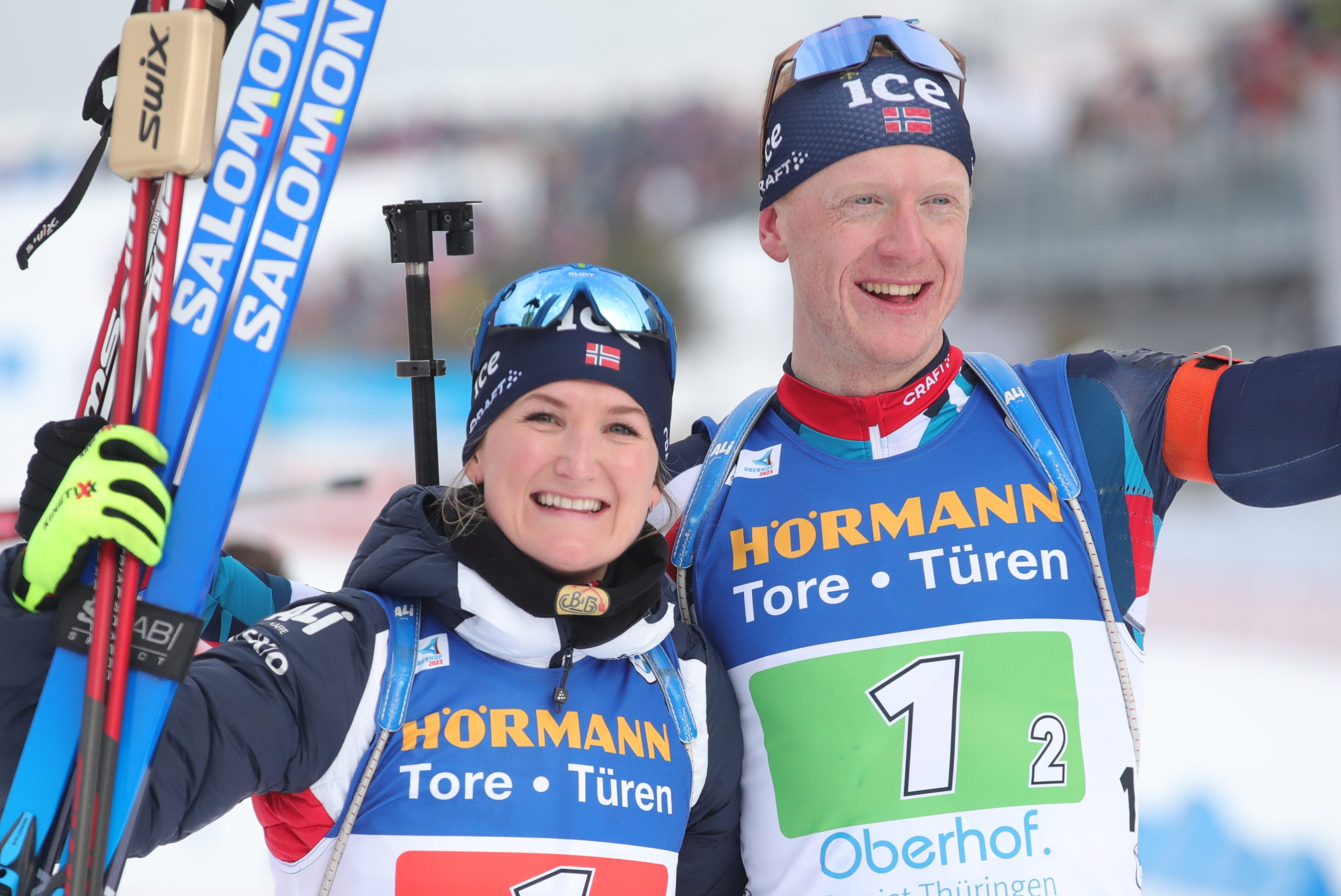
- Location: Oberhof, Germany
- Dates: 16 February
- Competitors: 54 from 27 nations
- Teams: 27
- Winning time: 35:37.1

Medalists
gold medal	Marte Olsbu Røiseland; Johannes Thingnes Bø	Norway
silver medal	Lisa Theresa Hauser; David Komatz	Austria
bronze medal	Lisa Vittozzi; Tommaso Giacomel	Italy

The 6 km/7.5 km single mixed relay competition at the Biathlon World Championships 2023 was held on 16 February 2023.

== Results ==
The race was started at 15:10.

Rank	Bib	Team	Time	Penalties (P+S)	Deficit
1st place, gold medalist(s)	1	Norway; Marte Olsbu Røiseland; Johannes Thingnes Bø; Marte Olsbu Røiseland; Johannes Thingnes Bø	35:37.1; 8:42.6; 7:36.4; 8:33.3; 10:44.8	1+6 0+0; 0+2 0+0; 0+1 0+0; 0+0 0+0; 1+3 0+0	
2nd place, silver medalist(s)	5	Austria; Lisa Theresa Hauser; David Komatz; Lisa Theresa Hauser; David Komatz	35:50.9; 8:30.8; 7:46.0; 8:44.7; 10:49.4	0+3 0+3; 0+0 0+1; 0+1 0+0; 0+1 0+1; 0+1 0+1	+13.8
3rd place, bronze medalist(s)	11	Italy; Lisa Vittozzi; Tommaso Giacomel; Lisa Vittozzi; Tommaso Giacomel	36:28.1; 8:29.0; 7:52.6; 8:38.5; 11:28.0	0+2 2+7; 0+0 0+1; 0+1 0+1; 0+0 0+2; 0+1 2+3	+51.0
4	10	Sweden; Hanna Öberg; Sebastian Samuelsson; Hanna Öberg; Sebastian Samuelsson	36:53.5; 8:32.0; 8:21.4; 8:37.3; 11:22.8	0+5 1+7; 0+1 0+1; 0+3 0+1; 0+0 0+2; 0+1 1+3	+1:16.4
5	2	France; Lou Jeanmonnot; Fabien Claude; Lou Jeanmonnot; Fabien Claude	36:59.0; 9:20.9; 7:46.3; 8:49.7; 11:02.1	0+3 1+9; 0+2 0+3; 0+0 0+2; 0+1 0+1; 0+0 1+3	+1:21.9
6	13	Germany; Sophia Schneider; Philipp Nawrath; Sophia Schneider; Philipp Nawrath	37:07.8; 8:50.6; 8:02.0; 9:17.1; 10:58.1	1+5 0+7; 0+0 0+3; 0+0 0+3; 1+3 0+0; 0+2 0+1	+1:30.7
7	14	Slovenia; Polona Klemenčič; Jakov Fak; Polona Klemenčič; Jakov Fak	37:15.2; 9:24.4; 7:57.7; 8:47.6; 11:05.5	0+2 0+6; 0+1 0+2; 0+0 0+1; 0+1 0+0; 0+0 0+3	+1:38.1
8	9	Moldova; Alina Stremous; Maksim Makarov; Alina Stremous; Maksim Makarov	37:37.8; 9:23.0; 7:49.0; 8:56.6; 11:29.2	0+5 0+2; 0+2 0+1; 0+1 0+0; 0+0 0+0; 0+2 0+1	+2:00.7
9	18	Estonia; Tuuli Tomingas; Rene Zahkna; Tuuli Tomingas; Rene Zahkna	38:01.9; 9:05.8; 8:45.7; 9:03.5; 11:06.9	1+7 0+2; 0+1 0+1; 1+3 0+1; 0+2 0+0; 0+1 0+0	+2:24.8
10	4	Finland; Suvi Minkkinen; Olli Hiidensalo; Suvi Minkkinen; Olli Hiidensalo	38:04.3; 8:51.6; 8:03.5; 9:25.3; 11:43.9	0+5 2+8; 0+1 0+1; 0+1 0+1; 0+1 1+3; 0+2 1+3	+2:27.2
11	6	United States; Deedra Irwin; Paul Schommer; Deedra Irwin; Paul Schommer	38:07.0; 9:19.4; 8:06.7; 9:16.2; 11:24.7	0+3 1+10; 0+0 0+3; 0+2 0+2; 0+1 0+2; 0+0 1+3	+2:29.9
12	3	Switzerland; Lena Häcki; Niklas Hartweg; Lena Häcki; Niklas Hartweg	38:18.4; 9:22.8; 8:19.1; 9:33.1; 11:03.4	0+9 2+12; 0+3 1+3; 0+2 0+3; 0+3 1+3; 0+1 0+3	+2:41.3
13	23	Canada; Emma Lunder; Adam Runnalls; Emma Lunder; Adam Runnalls	38:24.1; 9:06.8; 8:51.5; 9:05.8; 11:20.0	0+5 2+6; 0+1 0+1; 0+2 2+3; 0+0 0+0; 0+2 0+2	+2:47.0
14	15	Czech Republic; Tereza Voborníková; Michal Krčmář; Tereza Voborníková; Michal Krčmář	38:24.8; 9:09.5; 8:55.7; 9:09.1; 11:10.5	2+4 1+9; 0+0 0+3; 2+3 0+3; 0+1 0+0; 0+0 1+3	+2:47.7
15	7	Ukraine; Anastasiya Merkushyna; Dmytro Pidruchnyi; Anastasiya Merkushyna; Dmytro Pidruchnyi	38:25.3; 9:07.3; 8:03.0; 10:11.5; 11:03.5	0+2 4+9; 0+0 0+2; 0+1 0+1; 0+1 3+3; 0+0 1+3	+2:48.2
16	12	Poland; Anna Mąka; Marcin Zawol; Anna Mąka; Marcin Zawol	38:45.0; 8:58.2; 8:38.5; 8:57.6; 12:10.7	1+5 0+4; 0+0 0+0; 0+2 0+2; 0+0 0+0; 1+3 0+2	+3:07.9
17	27	Belgium; Lotte Lie; Florent Claude; Lotte Lie; Florent Claude	38:57.4; 9:12.7; 8:07.5; 9:22.8; 12:14.4	1+7 1+4; 0+1 0+1; 0+2 0+0; 0+1 0+0; 1+3 1+3	+3:20.3
18	20	Kazakhstan; Lyudmila Akhatova; Alexandr Mukhin; Lyudmila Akhatova; Alexandr Mukhin	39:07.4; 10:08.7; 8:08.6; 9:32.5; 11:17.6	0+4 0+5; 0+1 0+3; 0+1 0+1; 0+0 0+1; 0+2 0+0	+3:30.3
19	25	Latvia; Baiba Bendika; Andrejs Rastorgujevs; Baiba Bendika; Andrejs Rastorgujevs	39:24.8; 8:53.8; 8:30.8; 10:07.9; 11:52.3	1+9 3+7; 0+1 0+0; 1+3 0+1; 0+3 2+3; 0+2 1+3	+3:47.7
20	22	Bulgaria; Daniela Kadeva; Anton Sinapov; Daniela Kadeva; Anton Sinapov	39:35.0; 0+2 0+2; 0+0 0+2; 0+1 0+1; 0+0 1+3	0+3 1+8; 9:46.8; 8:09.0; 9:47.9; 11:51.3	+3:57.9
21	21	Lithuania; Gabrielė Leščinskaitė; Tomas Kaukenas; Gabrielė Leščinskaitė; Tomas Kaukenas	39:45.6; 9:48.8; 8:28.9; 9:19.1; 12:08.8	0+4 0+9; 0+0 2+3; 0+1 0+3; 0+0 0+0; 0+3 1+3	+4:08.5
22	8	Japan; Fuyuko Tachizaki; Mikito Tachizaki; Fuyuko Tachizaki; Mikito Tachizaki	LAP; 9:34.3; 8:39.9; 10:14.5	0+1 0+3; 0+2 0+2; 0+0 3+3; 0+0	
23	16	Romania; Anastasia Tolmacheva; George Buta; Anastasia Tolmacheva; George Buta	LAP; 10:37.1; 8:06.3	0+0 3+3; 0+0 0+1; 0+0 0+3	
24	19	Slovakia; Mária Remeňová; Michal Šíma; Mária Remeňová; Michal Šíma	LAP; 9:39.3; 8:55.3	0+1 1+3; 0+0 2+3; 0+1 1+3	
25	17	South Korea; Ekaterina Avvakumova; Timofey Lapshin; Ekaterina Avvakumova; Timofey Lapshin	LAP; 10:10.0; 8:03.0	1+3 0+2; 0+0 0+2; 2+3 0+3	
26	24	Croatia; Anika Kožica; Krešimir Crnković; Anika Kožica; Krešimir Crnković	LAP; 10:20.5; 8:57.5	0+1 3+3; 0+1 1+3; 0+1	
27	26	China; Chu Yuanmeng; Yan Xingyuan; Chu Yuanmeng; Yan Xingyuan	LAP; 9:56.0; 9:12.3	0+2 0+1; 0+1 1+3; 0+2	
