= Biathlon World Championships 2021 – Mixed relay =

Mixed relay at the Biathlon World Championships 2021
- Location: Pokljuka, Slovenia
- Date: 10 February
- Competitors: 108 from 27 nations
- Teams: 27
- Winning time: 1:20:19.3

Medalists
gold medal	Sturla Holm Lægreid; Johannes Thingnes Bø; Tiril Eckhoff; Marte Olsbu Røiseland	Norway
silver medal	David Komatz; Simon Eder; Dunja Zdouc; Lisa Theresa Hauser	Austria
bronze medal	Sebastian Samuelsson; Martin Ponsiluoma; Linn Persson; Hanna Öberg	Sweden

The mixed relay competition at the Biathlon World Championships 2021 was held on 10 February 2021.

== Results ==
The race was started at 15:00.

Rank	Bib	Team	Time	Penalties (P+S)	Deficit
1st place, gold medalist(s)	2	Norway; Sturla Holm Lægreid; Johannes Thingnes Bø; Tiril Eckhoff; Marte Olsbu Røiseland	1:20:19.3; 18:36.5; 18:21.3; 21:37.6; 21:43.9	0+4 0+7; 0+0 0+1; 0+1 0+1; 0+2 0+2; 0+1 0+3	
2nd place, silver medalist(s)	11	Austria; David Komatz; Simon Eder; Dunja Zdouc; Lisa Theresa Hauser	1:20:46.3; 19:02.2; 18:59.4; 21:31.5; 21:13.2	0+1 0+1; 0+1 0+0; 0+0 0+0; 0+0 0+0; 0+0 0+1	+27.0
3rd place, bronze medalist(s)	13	Sweden; Sebastian Samuelsson; Martin Ponsiluoma; Linn Persson; Hanna Öberg	1:20:49.9; 19:04.3; 18:56.7; 21:31.5; 21:17.4	0+3 0+5; 0+0 0+2; 0+1 0+2; 0+0 0+1; 0+2 0+0	+30.6
4	10	Ukraine; Artem Pryma; Dmytro Pidruchnyi; Yuliia Dzhima; Olena Pidhrushna	1:20:50.4; 18:45.8; 19:07.4; 21:21.5; 21:35.7	0+3 0+5; 0+1 0+0; 0+1 0+2; 0+1 0+0; 0+0 0+3	+31.1
5	3	France; Émilien Jacquelin; Quentin Fillon Maillet; Anaïs Chevalier-Bouchet; Julia Simon	1:21:05.5; 18:36.3; 19:00.7; 22:13.6; 21:14.9	0+6 1+4; 0+2 0+0; 0+2 0+1; 0+1 1+3; 0+1 0+0	+46.2
6	7	Italy; Didier Bionaz; Lukas Hofer; Dorothea Wierer; Lisa Vittozzi	1:21:18.2; 19:32.6; 19:05.6; 21:36.2; 21:03.8	0+3 0+3; 0+2 0+1; 0+0 0+1; 0+0 0+1; 0+1 0+0	+58.9
7	5	Germany; Erik Lesser; Arnd Peiffer; Denise Herrmann; Franziska Preuß	1:21:24.2; 19:34.2; 19:05.5; 21:24.8; 21:19.7	0+2 0+9; 0+1 0+3; 0+0 0+1; 0+0 0+3; 0+1 0+2	+1:04.9
8	15	Canada; Christian Gow; Scott Gow; Nadia Moser; Emma Lunder	1:22:25.3; 18:46.7; 19:06.8; 22:54.5; 21:37.3	0+1 0+5; 0+0 0+1; 0+0 0+1; 0+0 0+3; 0+1 0+0	+2:06.0
9	1	RBU; Alexander Loginov; Eduard Latypov; Svetlana Mironova; Uliana Kaisheva	1:22:30.7; 19:01.7; 19:09.0; 22:38.3; 21:41.7	0+5 2+4; 0+2 0+1; 0+3 0+0; 0+0 2+3; 0+0 0+0	+2:11.4
10	6	Switzerland; Benjamin Weger; Jeremy Finello; Selina Gasparin; Lena Häcki	1:22:57.8; 19:13.9; 19:24.5; 21:23.3; 22:56.1	0+4 1+5; 0+1 0+1; 0+0 0+1; 0+0 0+0; 0+3 1+3	+2:38.5
11	14	Czech Republic; Ondřej Moravec; Michal Krčmář; Markéta Davidová; Lucie Charvátová	1:23:19.3; 19:34.7; 19:33.4; 21:27.0; 22:44.2	0+2 2+7; 0+1 0+1; 0+0 0+3; 0+1 0+0; 0+0 2+3	+3:00.0
12	9	United States; Sean Doherty; Jake Brown; Joanne Reid; Clare Egan	1:23:44.1; 19:14.2; 19:24.6; 22:21.8; 22:43.5	0+3 0+5; 0+0 0+0; 0+0 0+2; 0+2 0+1; 0+1 0+2	+3:24.8
13	8	Finland; Tuomas Harjula; Tero Seppälä; Suvi Minkkinen; Mari Eder	1:23:54.4; 19:32.1; 19:24.1; 23:03.3; 21:54.9	0+2 0+4; 0+2 0+1; 0+0 0+3; 0+0 0+0; 0+0 0+0	+3:35.1
14	4	Belarus; Anton Smolski; Sergey Bocharnikov; Elena Kruchinkina; Dzinara Alimbekava	1:24:20.2; 18:32.2; 20:35.3; 23:41.0; 21:31.7	0+4 2+4; 0+1 0+0; 0+1 0+1; 0+2 2+3; 0+0 0+0	+4:00.9
15	26	Bulgaria; Dimitar Gerdzhikov; Vladimir Iliev; Milena Todorova; Daniela Kadeva	24:26.5; 19:24.6; 19:43.1; 22:04.2; 23:14.6	0+3 0+2; 0+0 0+0; 0+2 0+0; 0+1 0+1; 0+0 0+1	+4:07.2
16	17	Slovenia; Jakov Fak; Klemen Bauer; Polona Klemenčič; Živa Klemenčič	1:24:57.2; 18:43.9; 19:53.9; 23:07.8; 23:11.6	0+1 1+5; 0+0 0+1; 0+1 0+1; 0+0 0+0; 0+0 1+3	+4:37.9
17	22	Lithuania; Karol Dombrovski; Vytautas Strolia; Gabrielė Leščinskaitė; Natalija Kočergina	1:25:20.3; 19:33.8; 19:40.9; 23:02.4; 23:03.2	0+4 0+6; 0+0 0+2; 0+2 0+0; 0+0 0+2; 0+2 0+2	+5:01.0
18	20	Slovakia; Michal Šíma; Tomáš Hasilla; Ivona Fialková; Paulína Fialková	1:25:25.4; 20:16.6; 19:54.1; 23:21.1; 21:53.6	0+2 1+8; 0+1 0+3; 0+1 0+1; 0+0 1+3; 0+0 0+1	+5:06.1
19	16	Estonia; Rene Zahkna; Kalev Ermits; Johanna Talihärm; Tuuli Tomingas	1:25:25.6; 19:35.2; 20:34.4; 23:08.2; 22:07.8	0+2 0+6; 0+0 0+1; 0+0 0+2; 0+2 0+2; 0+0 0+1	+5:06.3
20	18	Japan; Mikito Tachizaki; Tsukasa Kobonoki; Fuyuko Tachizaki; Sari Maeda	1:25:41.9; 20:26.3; 20:08.0; 22:27.0; 22:40.6	0+5 1+7; 0+1 1+3; 0+1 0+2; 0+0 0+1; 0+3 0+1	+5:22.6
21	24	Belgium; Florent Claude; Thierry Langer; Lotte Lie; Rieke De Meyer	1:26:50.4; 19:25.0; 19:56.3; 22:37.2; 24:51.9	0+3 0+1; 0+2 0+0; 0+0 0+0; 0+0 0+1; 0+1 0+0	+6:31.1
22	25	Moldova; Maksim Makarov; Mihail Usov; Alina Stremous; Alla Ghilenko	1:26:59.7; 20:20.3; 20:08.0; 23:40.5; 22:50.9	0+8 0+7; 0+3 0+1; 0+2 0+0; 0+3 0+3; 0+0 0+3	+6:40.4
23	19	Latvia; Aleksandrs Patrijuks; Edgars Mise; Baiba Bendika; Sanita Buliņa	1:27:05.4; 19:59.7; 20:35.0; 22:06.0; 24:24.7	0+4 0+4; 0+1 0+0; 0+0 0+3; 0+2 0+1; 0+1 0+0	+6:46.1
24	12	Poland; Andrzej Nędza-Kubiniec; Grzegorz Guzik; Anna Mąka; Kamila Żuk	1:27:06.3; 20:00.8; 21:16.0; 22:42.2; 23:07.3	0+0 3+9; 0+0 0+0; 0+0 2+3; 0+0 0+3; 0+0 1+3	+6:47.0
25	23	Romania; George Buta; Cornel Puchianu; Elena Chirkova; Ana Cotrus	LAP; 19:36.8; 21:06.7; 24:10.7	2+9 2+3; 0+2 0+0; 0+1 2+3; 0+3 0+0; 2+3	
26	27	South Korea; Kim Yong-gyu; Choi Du-jin; Ekaterina Avvakumova; Anna Frolina	LAP; 20:54.4; 21:43.1	0+1 0+4; 0+1 0+3; 0+0 0+1; 0+0 0+0	
27	21	Kazakhstan; Alexandr Mukhin; Vladislav Kireyev; Yelizaveta Belchenko; Galina Vishnevskaya-Sheporenko	LAP; 22:04.6; 21:06.3	0+4 3+6; 0+3 3+3; 0+1 0+3; 0+0 0+0	
