= Biathlon World Championships 2025 – Men's individual =

Men's individual at the Biathlon World Championships 2025
- Venue: Roland Arena
- Location: Lenzerheide, Switzerland
- Dates: 19 February
- Competitors: 97 from 31 nations
- Winning time: 47:58.1

Medalists
gold medal	Éric Perrot	France
silver medal	Tommaso Giacomel	Italy
bronze medal	Quentin Fillon Maillet	France

The Men's individual competition at the Biathlon World Championships 2025 was held on 19 February 2025.

== Results ==
The race was started at 15:05.

Rank	Bib	Name	Nationality	Penalties (P+S+P+S)	Time	Deficit
1st place, gold medalist(s)	40	Éric Perrot	France	1 (0+1+0+0)	47:58.1	
2nd place, silver medalist(s)	54	Tommaso Giacomel	Italy	1 (0+0+0+1)	48:50.5	+52.4
3rd place, bronze medalist(s)	56	Quentin Fillon Maillet	France	3 (2+0+1+0)	49:57.6	+1:59.5
4	75	Olli Hiidensalo	Finland	0 (0+0+0+0)	50:13.0	+2:14.9
5	16	Niklas Hartweg	Switzerland	2 (0+1+0+1)	50:13.6	+2:15.5
6	58	Jakov Fak	Slovenia	1 (1+0+0+0)	50:16.9	+2:18.8
7	36	Philipp Horn	Germany	2 (1+0+0+1)	50:54.1	+2:56.0
8	55	Michal Krčmář	Czech Republic	2 (0+0+0+2)	51:01.0	+3:02.9
9	48	Endre Strømsheim	Norway	1 (1+0+0+0)	51:06.3	+3:08.2
10	38	Tarjei Bø	Norway	2 (1+0+0+1)	51:16.7	+3:18.6
11	3	Sebastian Stalder	Switzerland	1 (1+0+0+0)	51:19.7	+3:21.6
12	20	Johannes Kühn	Germany	2 (0+1+0+1)	51:23.4	+3:25.3
13	32	Thierry Langer	Belgium	0 (0+0+0+0)	51:33.1	+3:35.0
14	63	Jesper Nelin	Sweden	3 (2+0+1+0)	51:39.4	+3:41.3
15	60	Sturla Holm Lægreid	Norway	2 (0+1+1+0)	51:48.3	+3:50.2
16	30	Andrejs Rastorgujevs	Latvia	2 (0+1+0+1)	51:51.5	+3:53.4
17	22	Vitalii Mandzyn	Ukraine	2 (1+0+0+1)	51:57.0	+3:58.9
18	59	Maksim Makarov	Moldova	1 (0+1+0+0)	51:59.1	+4:01.0
19	28	Martin Ponsiluoma	Sweden	5 (1+0+2+2)	52:14.5	+4:16.4
20	52	Johannes Thingnes Bø	Norway	5 (3+1+0+1)	52:18.0	+4:19.9
21	46	Fabien Claude	France	4 (1+1+0+2)	52:22.8	+4:24.7
22	24	Danilo Riethmüller	Germany	3 (2+0+0+1)	52:37.9	+4:39.8
23	26	Campbell Wright	United States	4 (1+2+0+1)	52:44.1	+4:46.0
24	9	Paul Schommer	United States	3 (1+1+0+1)	52:48.8	+4:50.7
25	70	Jake Brown	United States	3 (0+1+2+0)	52:52.8	+4:54.7
26	53	David Komatz	Austria	2 (0+0+0+2)	53:11.6	+5:13.5
27	34	Vítězslav Hornig	Czech Republic	4 (2+0+1+1)	53:13.7	+5:15.6
28	57	David Zobel	Germany	2 (0+0+0+2)	53:14.4	+5:16.3
29	23	Joscha Burkhalter	Switzerland	4 (1+1+1+1)	53:17.2	+5:19.1
30	47	Konrad Badacz	Poland	2 (0+0+1+1)	53:18.2	+5:20.1
31	72	Tero Seppälä	Finland	4 (2+0+1+1)	53:31.0	+5:32.9
32	61	Jakob Kulbin	Estonia	2 (0+0+2+0)	53:34.5	+5:36.4
33	7	Arttu Heikkinen	Finland	3 (0+1+0+2)	53:38.8	+5:40.7
34	14	Fredrik Mühlbacher	Austria	3 (1+1+1+0)	53:53.4	+5:55.3
35	10	George Colțea	Romania	3 (1+1+0+1)	53:53.6	+5:55.5
36	17	Artem Tyshchenko	Ukraine	1 (0+0+0+1)	53:54.0	+5:55.9
37	5	Anton Vidmar	Slovenia	3 (0+1+0+2)	53:55.6	+5:57.5
38	67	Miha Dovžan	Slovenia	3 (0+1+0+2)	53:57.7	+5:59.6
39	71	Florent Claude	Belgium	4 (2+1+1+0)	54:02.4	+6:04.3
40	4	Maksim Fomin	Lithuania	3 (1+2+0+0)	54:02.9	+6:04.8
41	49	Simon Eder	Austria	4 (1+1+0+2)	54:04.6	+6:06.5
42	27	Viktor Brandt	Sweden	5 (2+2+0+1)	54:05.5	+6:07.4
43	62	Martin Uldal	Norway	5 (1+2+1+1)	54:05.7	+6:07.6
44	37	Krešimir Crnković	Croatia	2 (0+0+0+2)	54:17.3	+6:19.2
45	50	Vebjørn Sørum	Norway	5 (1+1+1+2)	54:22.2	+6:24.1
46	31	Rene Zahkna	Estonia	3 (1+1+0+1)	54:27.3	+6:29.2
47	42	Sebastian Samuelsson	Sweden	6 (0+3+1+2)	54:32.9	+6:34.8
48	33	Renārs Birkentāls	Latvia	3 (0+2+1+0)	54:33.1	+6:35.0
49	64	Didier Bionaz	Italy	5 (2+0+2+1)	54:38.8	+6:40.7
50	2	Anton Dudchenko	Ukraine	4 (0+1+1+2)	54:42.4	+6:44.3
51	39	Pavel Magazeev	Moldova	4 (1+0+1+2)	54:43.5	+6:45.4
52	66	Patrick Jakob	Austria	4 (1+1+1+1)	54:47.3	+6:49.2
53	45	George Buta	Romania	3 (1+0+2+0)	54:49.2	+6:51.1
54	41	Jaakko Ranta	Finland	3 (0+1+2+0)	55:10.0	+7:00.8
55	19	Elia Zeni	Italy	4 (2+0+0+2)	55:01.0	+7:02.9
56	15	Konstantin Vasilev	Bulgaria	3 (2+0+0+1)	55:01.7	+7:03.6
56	21	Vladimir Iliev	Bulgaria	5 (1+1+3+0)	55:01.7	+7:03.6
58	91	Tomas Kaukėnas	Lithuania	3 (1+1+0+1)	55:15.6	+7:17.5
59	65	Blagoy Todev	Bulgaria	4 (1+1+1+1)	55:15.8	+7:17.7
60	11	Mihail Usov	Moldova	4 (2+2+0+0)	55:16.4	+7:18.3
61	92	Edgars Mise	Latvia	2 (0+0+0+2)	55:17.1	+7:19.0
62	51	Maxime Germain	United States	4 (1+1+1+1)	55:19.6	+7:21.5
63	1	Tomáš Mikyska	Czech Republic	6 (1+1+3+1)	55:21.3	+7:23.2
64	73	Denys Nasyko	Ukraine	3 (2+0+0+1)	55:23.4	+7:25.3
65	82	Logan Pletz	Canada	3 (2+1+0+0)	55:26.8	+7:28.7
66	68	Adam Runnalls	Canada	5 (2+0+2+1)	55:28.1	+7:30.0
67	44	Émilien Jacquelin	France	5 (2+0+2+1)	55:46.2	+7:48.1
68	94	Fabian Suchodolski	Poland	3 (2+0+0+1)	55:49.2	+7:51.1
69	12	Sondre Slettemark	Greenland	3 (0+1+2+0)	55:10.0	+8:11.9
70	18	Lukas Hofer	Italy	7 (0+3+4+0)	56:24.4	+8:26.3
71	25	Lovro Planko	Slovenia	6 (1+3+0+2)	56:30.3	+8:32.2
72	35	Vytautas Strolia	Lithuania	6 (1+2+1+2)	56:45.1	+8:47.0
73	97	Haldan Borglum	Canada	3 (1+1+0+1)	56:45.2	+8:47.1
74	43	Vladislav Kireyev	Kazakhstan	5 (3+1+1+0)	56:49.6	+8:51.5
75	89	Vadim Kurales	Kazakhstan	3 (1+0+0+2)	56:55.0	+8:56.9
76	6	Kristo Siimer	Estonia	5 (2+1+1+1)	57:01.6	+9:03.5
77	95	Artur Iskhakov	Slovakia	3 (0+1+2+0)	57:02.4	+9:04.3
78	80	Marcus Bolin Webb	Great Britain	2 (0+1+1+0)	57:06.3	+9:08.2
79	77	Apostolos Angelis	Greece	2 (1+0+0+1)	57:16.2	+9:18.1
80	69	Dmitrii Shamaev	Romania	4 (0+2+2+0)	57:32.3	+9:34.2
81	87	Damián Cesnek	Slovakia	3 (1+0+0+2)	58:12.5	+10:14.4
82	90	César Beauvais	Belgium	5 (1+1+2+1)	58:32.7	+10:34.6
83	29	Jonáš Mareček	Czech Republic	7 (2+2+2+1)	58:44.8	+10:46.7
84	83	Nikolaos Tsourekas	Greece	2 (0+0+2+0)	58:50.2	+10:52.1
85	13	Tomáš Sklenárik	Slovakia	4 (0+2+1+1)	58:53.9	+10:55.8
86	8	Alexandr Mukhin	Kazakhstan	9 (3+1+3+2)	59:17.0	+11:18.9
87	79	Raul Flore	Romania	5 (3+1+0+1)	59:38.3	+11:40.2
88	81	Phoenix Sparke	Australia	5 (1+1+0+3)	1:00:02.7	+12:04.6
89	84	Asset Dyussenov	Kazakhstan	8 (3+2+1+2)	1:00:20.5	+12:22.4
90	93	Joachim Weel Rosbo	Denmark	7 (2+1+1+3)	1:00:28.4	+12:30.3
91	74	Jan Guńka	Poland	7 (0+2+3+2)	1:00:33.7	+12:35.6
92	85	Matthew Chronicle	Great Britain	6 (1+3+1+1)	1:01:21.6	+13:23.5
93	76	Noah Bradford	Australia	4 (0+2+1+1)	1:01:31.5	+13:33.4
94	96	Aleksandrs Patrijuks	Latvia	9 (3+3+0+3)	1:02:17.0	+14:18.9
95	78	Jacob Weel Rosbo	Denmark	11 (2+4+1+4)	1:04:20.9	+16:22.8
96	88	Javier Gimenez	Argentina	8 (2+2+2+2)	1:04:53.2	+16:55.1
	86	Enkhsaikhan Enkhbat	Mongolia	(2+0+)	Did not finish	
