= Biathlon World Championships 2024 – Men's mass start =

Men's mass start at the Biathlon World Championships 2024
- Venue: Vysočina Arena
- Location: Nové Město na Moravě, Czech Republic
- Dates: 18 February
- Competitors: 30 from 14 nations
- Winning time: 34:50.2

Medalists
gold medal	Johannes Thingnes Bø	Norway
silver medal	Andrejs Rastorgujevs	Latvia
bronze medal	Quentin Fillon Maillet	France

The Men's mass start competition at the Biathlon World Championships 2024 will be held on 18 February 2024.

Sebastian Samuelsson was the defending champion. He did not defend his title, finishing the competition in 23rd place.

Reigning Olympic champion in mass start Johannes Thingnes Bø from Norway became the new world champion. He won his 20th championship gold medal, equaling Ole Einar Bjørndalen for first place with the most world championship gold medals in history.

The silver medal won Andrejs Rastorgujevs from Latvia, winning the country's first ever world championship medal and the bronze medal won Quentin Fillon Maillet from France.

== Results ==
The race was started at 16:30.

Rank	Bib	Name	Nationality	Penalties (P+P+S+S)	Time	Deficit
1st place, gold medalist(s)	2	Johannes Thingnes Bø	Norway	1 (1+0+0+0)	34:50.2	
2nd place, silver medalist(s)	16	Andrejs Rastorgujevs	Latvia	0 (0+0+0+0)	35:05.3	+15.1
3rd place, bronze medalist(s)	15	Quentin Fillon Maillet	France	1 (0+0+1+0)	35:23.2	+33.0
4	3	Tarjei Bø	Norway	2 (0+0+1+1)	35:32.3	+42.1
5	23	Fabien Claude	France	2 (1+0+1+0)	35:52.7	+1:02.5
6	20	Jakov Fak	Slovenia	1 (0+1+0+0)	36:01.1	+1:10.9
7	12	Sebastian Stalder	Switzerland	0 (0+0+0+0)	36:02.2	+1:12.0
8	4	Vetle Sjåstad Christiansen	Norway	4 (1+2+0+1)	36:05.1	+1:14.9
9	14	Eric Perrot	France	3 (2+0+0+1)	36:12.3	+1:22.1
10	9	Philipp Nawrath	Germany	3 (1+1+0+1)	36:15.6	+1:25.4
11	13	Émilien Jacquelin	France	5 (2+2+1+0)	36:20.7	+1:30.5
12	5	Benedikt Doll	Germany	3 (0+0+1+2)	36:22.9	+1:32.7
13	6	Martin Ponsiluoma	Sweden	6 (2+1+2+1)	36:36.5	+1:46.3
14	7	Johannes Kühn	Germany	3 (1+1+0+1)	36:38.4	+1:48.2
15	8	Tommaso Giacomel	Italy	5 (1+2+1+1)	36:44.0	+1:53.8
16	10	Justus Strelow	Germany	1 (0+1+0+0)	36:47.5	+1:57.3
17	1	Sturla Holm Lægreid	Norway	4 (1+0+1+2)	36:54.1	+2:03.9
18	17	Campbell Wright	United States	4 (1+1+1+1)	36:56.4	+2:06.2
19	18	Lukas Hofer	Italy	4 (2+1+1+0)	36:57.5	+2:07.3
20	28	Anton Dudchenko	Ukraine	1 (0+1+0+0)	36:57.5	+2:07.3
21	29	David Komatz	Austria	2 (0+0+2+0)	37:11.7	+2:21.5
22	19	Niklas Hartweg	Switzerland	5 (1+3+1+0)	37:24.8	+2:34.6
23	11	Sebastian Samuelsson	Sweden	5 (1+0+3+1)	37:37.4	+2:47.2
24	21	Michal Krčmář	Czech Republic	4 (2+1+0+1)	37:42.4	+2:52.2
25	30	Simon Eder	Austria	3 (0+3+0+0)	37:42.9	+2:52.7
26	22	Tomáš Mikyska	Czech Republic	3 (1+1+1+0)	38:13.7	+3:23.5
27	24	Dmytro Pidruchnyi	Ukraine	4 (1+1+2+0)	38:38.5	+3:48.3
28	26	Sean Doherty	United States	5 (2+1+0+2)	39:00.2	+4:10.0
29	25	Adam Runnalls	Canada	4 (0+1+2+1)	39:06.9	+4:16.7
30	27	Timofey Lapshin	South Korea	6 (1+3+1+1)	40:24.7	+5:34.5
