= Biathlon World Championships 2021 – Men's mass start =

Men's mass start at the Biathlon World Championships 2021
- Location: Pokljuka, Slovenia
- Date: 21 February
- Competitors: 30 from 14 nations
- Winning time: 36:27.2

Medalists
gold medal	Sturla Holm Lægreid	Norway
silver medal	Johannes Dale	Norway
bronze medal	Quentin Fillon Maillet	France

The Men's mass start competition at the Biathlon World Championships 2021 was held on 21 February 2021.

== Results ==
The race was started at 15:15.

Rank	Bib	Name	Nationality	Penalties (P+P+S+S)	Time	Deficit
1st place, gold medalist(s)	3	Sturla Holm Lægreid	Norway	1 (0+0+0+1)	36:27.2	
2nd place, silver medalist(s)	8	Johannes Dale	Norway	2 (0+1+1+0)	36:37.4	+10.2
3rd place, bronze medalist(s)	9	Quentin Fillon Maillet	France	2 (1+1+0+0)	36:40.0	+12.8
4	14	Simon Eder	Austria	1 (0+0+0+1)	36:50.3	+23.1
5	12	Jakov Fak	Slovenia	1 (0+0+0+1)	36:57.2	+30.0
6	10	Tarjei Bø	Norway	2 (0+1+0+1)	37:00.5	+33.3
7	11	Lukas Hofer	Italy	2 (0+1+0+1)	37:06.9	+39.7
8	7	Johannes Thingnes Bø	Norway	5 (2+0+2+1)	37:12.6	+45.4
9	23	Alexander Loginov	RBU	2 (0+1+0+1)	37:17.2	+50.0
10	5	Sebastian Samuelsson	Sweden	3 (0+0+2+1)	37:26.9	+59.7
11	29	Christian Gow	Canada	1 (0+0+1+0)	37:29.3	+1:02.1
12	6	Arnd Peiffer	Germany	3 (0+0+1+2)	37:36.4	+1:09.2
13	4	Simon Desthieux	France	3 (1+1+1+0)	37:49.1	+1:21.9
14	18	Eduard Latypov	RBU	2 (0+1+1+0)	37:59.3	+1:32.1
15	25	Matvey Eliseev	RBU	3 (1+1+1+0)	38:11.1	+1:43.9
16	15	Vetle Sjåstad Christiansen	Norway	4 (1+2+1+0)	38:26.8	+1:59.6
17	24	Antonin Guigonnat	France	4 (1+3+0+0)	38:32.1	+2:04.9
18	22	Miha Dovžan	Slovenia	2 (1+0+0+1)	38:38.5	+2:11.3
19	1	Martin Ponsiluoma	Sweden	6 (1+3+1+1)	38:45.6	+2:18.4
20	27	Said Karimulla Khalili	RBU	3 (1+1+0+1)	38:46.3	+2:19.1
21	16	Artem Pryma	Ukraine	5 (0+1+1+3)	39:09.8	+2:42.6
22	17	Andrejs Rastorgujevs	Latvia	5 (2+1+1+1)	39:22.3	+2:55.1
23	13	Benedikt Doll	Germany	6 (3+0+1+2)	39:25.7	+2:58.5
24	28	Thomas Bormolini	Italy	2 (1+0+1+0)	39:30.7	+3:03.5
25	21	Florent Claude	Belgium	3 (0+1+1+1)	39:47.9	+3:20.7
26	20	Michal Krčmář	Czech Republic	5 (1+0+1+3)	39:53.2	+3:26.0
27	26	Peppe Femling	Sweden	4 (1+2+0+1)	39:53.3	+3:26.1
28	30	Jesper Nelin	Sweden	6 (2+2+2+0)	40:19.2	+3:52.0
29	19	Jake Brown	United States	6 (1+0+4+1)	40:24.3	+3:57.1
30	2	Émilien Jacquelin	France	5 (0+5+0+0)	43:36.7	+7:09.5
