= Tommaso Giacomel =

Italian biathlete (born 2000)

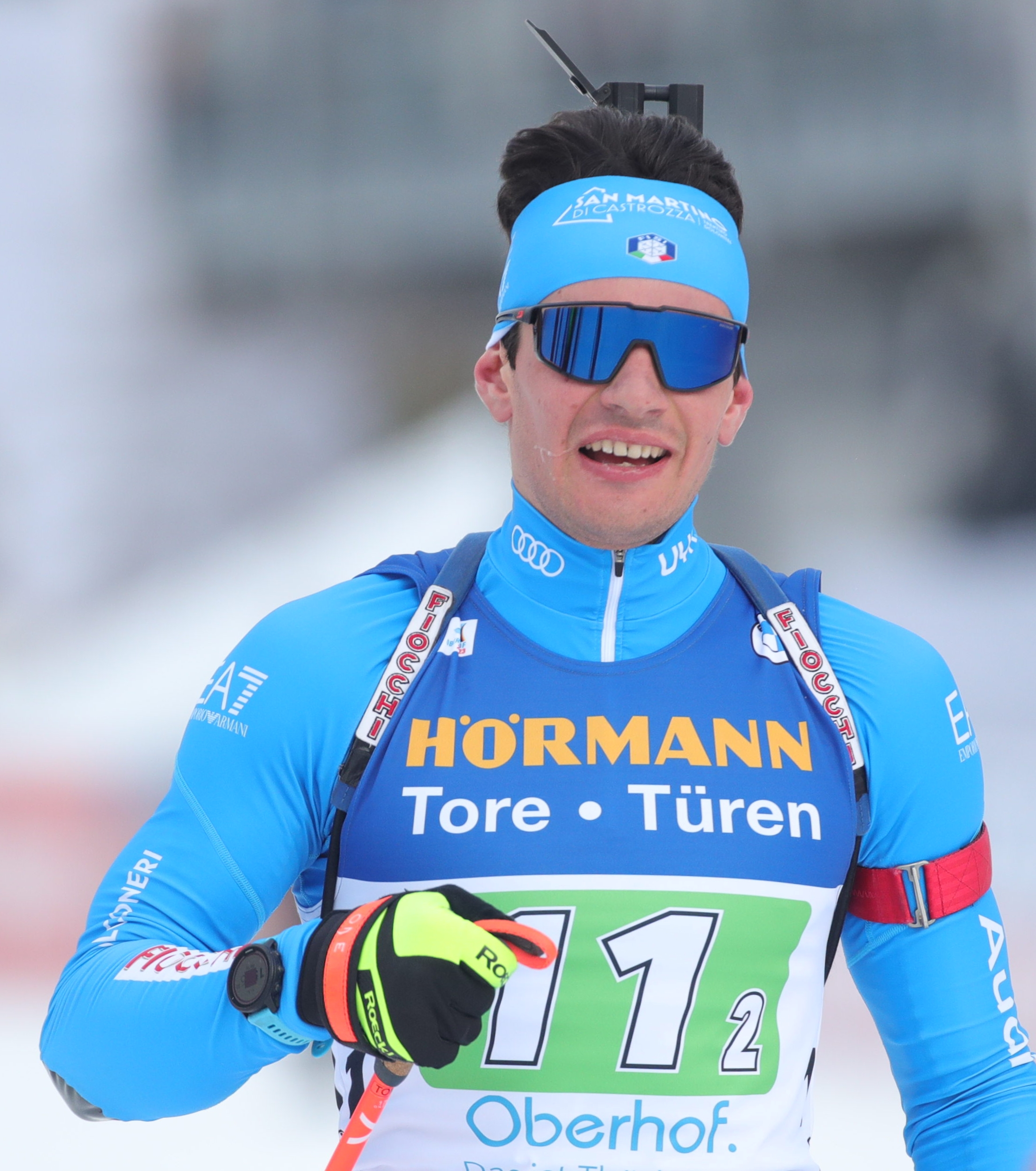

Personal information
- Nationality: Italian
- Born: 5 April 2000 (age 26) Sterzing, Italy
- Height: 1.83 m (6 ft 0 in)
- Weight: 79 kg (174 lb)

Sport
- Country: Italy
- Sport: Biathlon
Medal record
Men's biathlon
Representing Italy
Olympic Games
Silver medal – second place	2026 Milano Cortina	Mixed relay
World Championships
Silver medal – second place	2023 Oberhof	Mixed relay
Silver medal – second place	2024 Nové Město	Single mixed relay
Silver medal – second place	2025 Lenzerheide	20 km individual
Bronze medal – third place	2023 Oberhof	Single mixed relay
Youth World Championships
Silver medal – second place	2018 Otepää	7.5 km sprint
Bronze medal – third place	2019 Osrblie	3 × 7.5 km relay

Tommaso Giacomel (born 5 April 2000) is an Italian biathlete residing in Imer, Italy. He has competed in the Biathlon World Cup since 2019.

== Career ==
=== 2017-2019: Junior and Youth competitions ===
Giacomel made his international biathlon debut on December 9th, 2017, at the Biathlon Junior World Cup stage in Obertilliach. He finished 5th in the Junior Men 10 km Sprint, missing ones in both prone and stand shooting. He later placed 13th in the second Junior Men sprint competition in the same venue. In March 2018, he competed in the Biathlon Junior World Championships 2017 in the Youth category and placed 2nd in the Sprint, 6th in the Pursuit, 4th in the Men's Relay and 22nd in the Individual. The following year, he competed in the Biathlon Junior World Championships 2018 - he placed 35th in the Individual, 12th in the Sprint, 4th in the Pursuit, and 3rd in the Men's relay. Later that season, he had mixed results in other Junior competitions - including placing 2nd in the Sjusjøen Junior World Cup Men's Sprint and 3rd in the Junior European Championship Men's Sprint.

=== 2019-2020: IBU cup, World cup debut ===
In the Martell-Val Martello stage of the Biathlon Junior World Cup, he placed 3rd in the Sprint and 1st in the Pursuit - winning his first international gold medal. He was 6th in the Biathlon Junior World Championships 2020, in the Junior Men 10 km Sprint competition. Following his success in the Junior field, he made his 2019–20 Biathlon IBU Cup debut on 13 February 2020 in Martell-Val Martello, in the Qualifier round for the Men's Super Sprint, where he placed 73rd. Later that week he placed 49th in the Sprint and 21st in the Pursuit competitions. Giacomel made his Biathlon World Cup debut just two weeks later, in Nové Město na Moravě, where he shot clean and placed 27th - the highest ranking Italian of that day. He later placed 6th in the Men's Relay. He finished the season ranking 56th in the Sprint and 39th in the Pursuit competitions in Kontiolahti, as the season was cup short by the COVID-19 pandemic.

=== 2020-2021: Italian World Cup team ===
Although he was still eligible to compete in the Junior championships, Giacomel competed in the 2020–21 Biathlon World Cup season in the elite circuit, replacing Patrick Braunhofer as a representative of the Italian team starting in Oberhof. He placed 42nd in the Sprint and 34th in the Pursuit in the first week of competitions, and won his first World cup medal as the Italian team ranked 3rd in the Men's Relay in the following week. In the Biathlon World Championships 2021, he placed 70th in the Individual and 6th in the Men's relay. Later that season, in Nové Město na Moravě, he was chosen to compete in the Single Mixed Relay with Michela Carrara and placed 16th.

=== 2021-2022: First Olympics ===
Giacomel placed 95th in his first competition in the 2021–22 Biathlon World Cup, after missing 8 times in the individual. He then placed 42nd, 2nd among the Italians, in the Sprint competition. On the following week, he placed 7th in the Östersund Men's pursuit - his career best, missing once and gaining 19 places. His results towards the 2022 Winter Olympics were underwhelming, but he was nevertheless selected for the Italian team - placing 61st in the Sprint competition and 7th in the Men's relay. In Otepää, he competed in his first Mass Start competition and placed 21st. On the last week of the season, in Östersund, he placed 14th in the Sprint, 22nd in the Pursuit, and 27th in the Mass Start.

=== 2022-2023: First World Cup Podium ===
Giacomel achieved World Championship success for the first time at the 2023 World Championships in Oberhof claiming silver in the mixed relay alongside Lisa Vittozzi, Dorothea Wierer, and Didier Bionaz and bronze in the single mixed relay with Vittozzi. This came on the back of his first World Cup mixed relay podium when the Italian team placed second in Pokljuka. He also made his first individual World Cup podium in Östersund in the individual event where he placed second behind Benedikt Doll. He went on to finish second in the overall U25 race behind Niklas Hartweg.

=== 2023-2024: U25 Title ===
Giacomel won two individual medals in the World Cup with silvers in the Ruhpolding sprint and the Canmore sprint. He and Vittozzi also upgraded their Single Mixed Relay bronze to a silver at the 2024 World Championships in Nové Město. In addition to this he won three World Cup relay medals in the men's relay events at Oberhof, Ruhpolding, and Soldier Hollow and two mixed relay medals in Östersund and in front of a home crowd in Antholz-Anterselva. To cap this off he won the U25 crystal globe as well as placing 8th in the overall standings.

=== 2024-2025: First World Cup Victory ===
Following a social media post expressing his disappointment about his season to the point, Tommaso Giacomel won his very first World Cup event with a Mass Start win in Ruhpolding where he shot clean in all four stages. The week following this victory he claimed two bronze medals in Antholz-Anterselva in the sprint and pursuit events. At the 2025 World Championships in Lenzerheide he won his first individual World championships medal earning a silver medal in the Individual event. He then went on to win two silver medals at sprint and pursuit events the World Cup stop in Nové Město. He finished the year with a new high in the overall World Cup results of 6th place. Since the blue bib was altered from being U25 to U23, Giacomel did not qualify for it as he was 24 entering the season.

=== 2025-2026: Early Season Success and Heart Problems ===
Giacomel's World Cup season opened with a second place finish with the mixed relay team in Östersund followed by a gold and silver medal won the following week in Hochfilzen in the men's sprint and pursuit events. He went on a three win streak starting with the Annecy mass start victory and then winning the Oberhof sprint and pursuit events. In so doing, he became the first Italian yellow bib wearer in 34 years and kept the yellow bib till Éric Perrot surpassed him following the Nové Město mass start. His 2026 Olympics started off positively with a silver medal alongside the Italian team of Lukas Hofer, Lisa Vittozzi, and Dorothea Wierer in the mixed relay. Giacomel had three shooting penalties in the individual event however which left him in 6th. His problems on the range continued in the sprint where he also missed 3 shots and left him too far off the pace for contention in the pursuit. In the mass start competition which closed the Olympics, Giacomel went out well shooting clean in the first two stages but was forced to pull out mid-race due to breathing and movement issues. He later found out he had an electrical conduction anomaly in one of his heart atria and underwent minor ablation surgery. As a result, he was forced to sit out the rest of the season and could not continue contending for the crystal globe that season.

== Biathlon results ==
All results are sourced from the International Biathlon Union.

=== Olympic Games ===
1 medal

Event	Individual	Sprint	Pursuit	Mass start	Relay	Mixed relay
(Italy) 2026 Milano Cortina	6th	22nd	9th	DNF	14th	Silver

=== World Championships ===
4 medals (3 silver, 1 bronze)

Event	Individual	Sprint	Pursuit	Mass start	Relay	Mixed relay	Single mixed relay
(Germany) 2023 Oberhof	17th	17th	43rd	28th	7th	Silver	Bronze
(Czech Republic) 2024 Nové Město	45th	15th	20th	15th	6th	10th	Silver
(Switzerland) 2025 Lenzerheide	Silver	5th	5th	6th	5th	7th	7th

=== World Cup ===
World Cup rankings

Season	Overall	Individual	Sprint	Pursuit	Mass start
2019–20	78th	—	67th	70th	—
2020–21	72nd	—	80th	56th	—
2021–22	36th	—	36th	34th	31st
2022–23	12th	5th	15th	9th	13th
2023–24	8th	14th	5th	10th	13th
2024–25	6th	10th	5th	4th	7th
2025–26	6th	10th	4th	8th	12th

==== Individual podiums ====
- 5 victories
- 15 podiums

No.	Season	Date	Location	Level	Race	Place
1	2022–23	9 March 2023	(Sweden) Östersund	World Cup	Individual	2nd
2	2023–24	13 January 2024	(Germany) Ruhpolding	World Cup	Sprint	2nd
3	2023–24	15 March 2024	(Canada) Canmore	World Cup	Sprint	2nd
4	2024–25	19 January 2025	(Germany) Ruhpolding	World Cup	Mass Start	1st
5	2024–25	24 January 2025	(Italy) Antholz-Anterselva	World Cup	Sprint	3rd
6	2024–25	26 January 2025	(Italy) Antholz-Anterselva	World Cup	Pursuit	3rd
7	2024–25	19 February 2025	(Switzerland) Lenzerheide	World Championships	Individual	2nd
8	2024–25	6 March 2025	(Czech Republic) Nové Město na Moravě	World Cup	Sprint	2nd
9	2024–25	8 March 2025	(Czech Republic) Nové Město na Moravě	World Cup	Pursuit	2nd
10	2025–26	12 December 2025	(Austria) Hochfilzen	World Cup	Sprint	1st
11	2025–26	13 December 2025	(Austria) Hochfilzen	World Cup	Pursuit	2nd
12	2025–26	21 December 2025	(France) Le Grand-Bornand	World Cup	Mass Start	1st
13	2025–26	08 January 2026	(Germany) Oberhof	World Cup	Sprint	1st
14	2025–26	10 January 2026	(Germany) Oberhof	World Cup	Pursuit	1st
15	2025–26	17 January 2026	(Germany) Ruhpolding	World Cup	Sprint	2nd
