= Quentin Fillon Maillet =

French biathlete (born 1992)

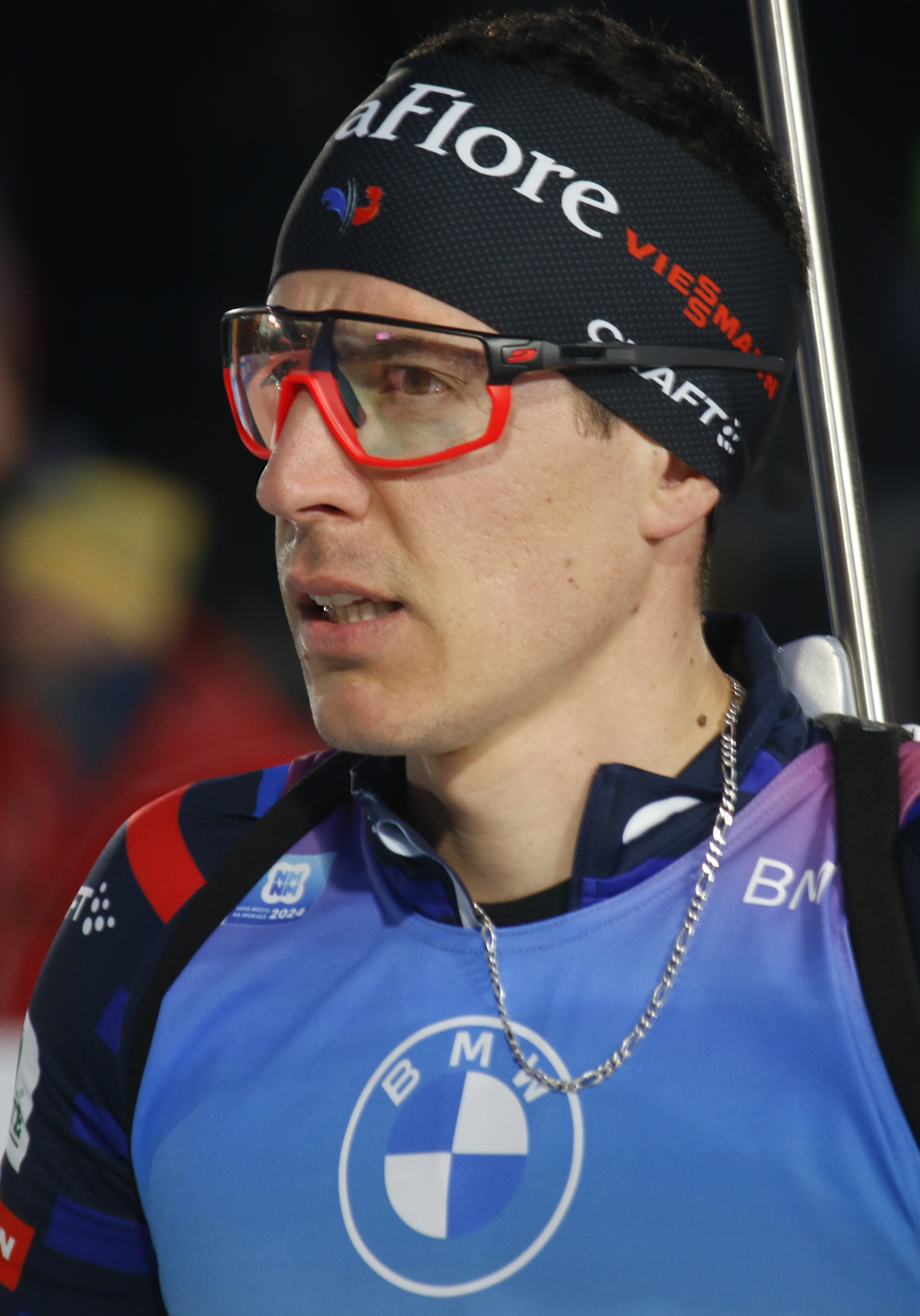
- Fillon Maillet in 2024

Personal information
- Nationality: French
- Born: 16 August 1992 (age 34) Champagnole, France
- Height: 1.77 m (5 ft 10 in)
- Weight: 70 kg (154 lb)

Sport

Professional information
- Sport: Biathlon
- Club: SC Grandvaux
- World Cup debut: 2013

Olympic Games
- Teams: 3 (2018, 2022, 2026)
- Medals: 9 (5 gold)

World Championships
- Teams: 9 (2015–2025)
- Medals: 20 (6 gold)

World Cup
- Seasons: 12 (2013/14–)
- Individual victories: 17
- All victories: 32
- Overall titles: 1 (2021–22)
- Discipline titles: 2: 1 Sprint (2021–22), 1 Pursuit (2021–22)
Medal record
Men's biathlon
Representing France
Event	1st	2nd	3rd
Olympic Games	5	3	1
World Championships	6	5	9
Total	11	8	10
Olympic Games
Gold medal – first place	2022 Beijing	12.5 km pursuit
Gold medal – first place	2022 Beijing	20 km individual
Gold medal – first place	2026 Milano Cortina	10 km sprint
Gold medal – first place	2026 Milano Cortina	4 × 7.5 km relay
Gold medal – first place	2026 Milano Cortina	Mixed relay
Silver medal – second place	2022 Beijing	10 km sprint
Silver medal – second place	2022 Beijing	4 × 7.5 km relay
Silver medal – second place	2022 Beijing	Mixed relay
Bronze medal – third place	2026 Milano Cortina	15 km mass start
World Championships
Gold medal – first place	2016 Oslo	Mixed relay
Gold medal – first place	2020 Antholz	4 × 7.5 km relay
Gold medal – first place	2023 Oberhof	4 × 7.5 km relay
Gold medal – first place	2024 Nové Město	Mixed relay
Gold medal – first place	2024 Nové Město	Single mixed relay
Gold medal – first place	2025 Lenzerheide	Single mixed relay
Silver medal – second place	2017 Hochfilzen	4 × 7.5 km relay
Silver medal – second place	2017 Hochfilzen	Mixed relay
Silver medal – second place	2020 Antholz	10 km sprint
Silver medal – second place	2020 Antholz	15 km mass start
Silver medal – second place	2025 Lenzerheide	4 × 7.5 km relay
Bronze medal – third place	2015 Kontiolahti	4 × 7.5 km relay
Bronze medal – third place	2019 Östersund	10 km sprint
Bronze medal – third place	2019 Östersund	12.5 km pursuit
Bronze medal – third place	2021 Pokljuka	15 km mass start
Bronze medal – third place	2023 Oberhof	Mixed relay
Bronze medal – third place	2024 Nové Město	15 km mass start
Bronze medal – third place	2024 Nové Město	4 × 7.5 km relay
Bronze medal – third place	2025 Lenzerheide	10 km sprint
Bronze medal – third place	2025 Lenzerheide	20 km individual
Junior World Championships
Silver medal – second place	2013 Obertilliach	4 × 7.5 km relay

Quentin Fillon Maillet (French pronunciation: [kɑ̃tɛ̃ fijɔ̃ majɛ]; born 16 August 1992) is a French biathlete. He is the a five-time Olympic champion and nine-time medallist, winning gold in the 20 km individual and the 12.5 km pursuit at the 2022 Winter Olympics and in the 10 km sprint, mixed relay, and the men's relay at the 2026 Winter Olympics. He is the first French athlete and the first biathlete to win five medals in a single edition of the Winter Games (in 2022). With nine overall Olympic medals, he is the most decorated French athlete in Olympic history. Fillon Maillet is also the winner of the 2021–22 Biathlon World Cup for men.

== Biathlon results ==
All results are sourced from the International Biathlon Union.

=== Olympic Games ===
9 medals (5 gold, 3 silver, 1 bronze)

== Honors and Awards ==
Officer of the Order of Legion of Honour

Event	Individual	Sprint	Pursuit	Mass start	Relay	Mixed relay
(South Korea) 2018 Pyeongchang	—	48th	44th	29th	—	—
(China) 2022 Beijing	Gold	Silver	Gold	4th	Silver	Silver
(Italy) 2026 Milano Cortina	8th	Gold	7th	Bronze	Gold	Gold

=== World Championships ===
20 medals (6 gold, 5 silver, 9 bronze)

Event	Individual	Sprint	Pursuit	Mass start	Relay	Mixed relay	Single mixed relay
(Finland) 2015 Kontiolahti	79th	38th	46th	—	Bronze	—	—N/a
(Norway) 2016 Oslo Holmenkollen	19th	16th	10th	20th	9th	Gold	—N/a
(Austria) 2017 Hochfilzen	17th	43rd	22nd	15th	Silver	Silver	—N/a
(Sweden) 2019 Östersund	12th	Bronze	Bronze	5th	6th	—	—
(Italy) 2020 Antholz-Anterselva	7th	Silver	7th	Silver	Gold	7th	—
(Slovenia) 2021 Pokljuka	4th	6th	4th	Bronze	4th	5th	—
(Germany) 2023 Oberhof	4th	9th	12th	6th	Gold	Bronze	—
(Czech Republic) 2024 Nové Město	6th	8th	11th	Bronze	Bronze	Gold	Gold
(Switzerland) 2025 Lenzerheide	Bronze	Bronze	6th	19th	Silver	—	Gold

*The single mixed relay was added as an event in 2019.

=== World Cup ===
World Cup rankings

Season	Overall		Individual		Sprint		Pursuit		Mass start	
Season	Points	Position	Points	Position	Points	Position	Points	Position	Points	Position
2013–14	101	51st	0	—N/a	40	50th	46	48th	15	38th
2014–15	408	23rd	58	18th	136	26th	86	30th	128	11th
2015–16	580	12th	78	10th	165	17th	175	14th	162	2nd
2016–17	466	20th	63	16th	128	35th	143	26th	132	11th
2017–18	518	10th	75	3rd	168	16th	136	17th	139	10th
2018–19	843	3rd	54	18th	267	7th	315	2nd	218	3rd
2019–20	843	3rd	120	3rd	324	2nd	230	3rd	216	2nd
2020–21	930	3rd	91	4th	302	6th	266	4th	165	3rd
2021–22	984	1st	55	8th	402	1st	379	1st	178	2nd
2022–23	671	8th	58	20th	213	8th	295	3rd	105	11th
2023–24	506	16th	40	24th	151	16th	179	14th	136	7th
2024–25	862	5th	112	4th	232	9th	250	6th	268	3rd
2025–26	689	11th	66	14th	279	8th	264	9th	80	20th

Individual podiums

- 19 victories (1 In, 6 Sp, 10 Pu, 2 MS)
- 63 podiums

No.	Season	Date	Location	Discipline	Level	Place
1	2014–15	18 January 2015	(Germany) Ruhpolding	15 km Mass Start	World Cup	2nd
2	2015–16	6 December 2015	(Sweden) Östersund	12.5 km Pursuit	World Cup	3rd
3	2015–16	6 February 2016	(Canada) Canmore	15 km Mass Start	World Cup	3rd
4	2016–17	17 December 2016	(Czech Republic) Nové Město	12.5 km Pursuit	World Cup	3rd
5	2016–17	22 January 2017	(Italy) Antholz-Anterselva	15 km Mass Start	World Cup	2nd
6	2017–18	30 November 2017	(Sweden) Östersund	20 km Individual	World Cup	2nd
7	2017–18	3 December 2017	(Sweden) Östersund	12.5 km Pursuit	World Cup	3rd
8	2017–18	8 March 2018	(Finland) Kontiolahti	10 km Sprint	World Cup	3rd
9	2018–19	9 December 2018	(Slovenia) Pokljuka	12.5 km Pursuit	World Cup	2nd
10	2018–19	23 December 2018	(Czech Republic) Nové Město	15 km Mass Start	World Cup	2nd
11	2018–19	20 January 2019	(Germany) Ruhpolding	15 km Mass Start	World Cup	3rd
12	2018–19	26 January 2019	(Italy) Antholz-Anterselva	12.5 km Pursuit	World Cup	3rd
13	2018–19	27 January 2019	(Italy) Antholz-Anterselva	15 km Mass Start	World Cup	1st
14	2018–19	16 February 2019	(United States) Soldier Hollow	12.5 km Pursuit	World Cup	1st
15	2018–19	9 March 2019	(Sweden) Östersund	10 km Sprint	World Championships	3rd
16	2018–19	10 March 2019	(Sweden) Östersund	12.5 km Pursuit	World Championships	3rd
17	2018–19	22 March 2019	(Norway) Oslo Holmenkollen	10 km Sprint	World Cup	3rd
18	2019–20	4 December 2019	(Sweden) Östersund	20 km Individual	World Cup	3rd
19	2019–20	19 December 2019	(France) Annecy-Le Grand-Bornand	10 km Sprint	World Cup	3rd
20	2019–20	21 December 2019	(France) Annecy-Le Grand-Bornand	12.5 km Pursuit	World Cup	2nd
21	2019–20	16 January 2020	(Germany) Ruhpolding	10 km Sprint	World Cup	2nd
22	2019–20	19 January 2020	(Germany) Ruhpolding	12.5 km Pursuit	World Cup	2nd
23	2019–20	26 January 2020	(Slovenia) Pokljuka	15 km Mass Start	World Cup	1st
24	2019–20	15 February 2020	(Italy) Antholz-Anterselva	10 km Sprint	World Championships	2nd
25	2019–20	23 February 2020	(Italy) Antholz-Anterselva	15 km Mass Start	World Championships	2nd
26	2019–20	6 March 2020	(Czech Republic) Nové Město	10 km Sprint	World Cup	2nd
27	2019–20	14 March 2020	(Finland) Kontiolahti	12.5 km Pursuit	World Cup	2nd
28	2020–21	11 December 2020	(Austria) Hochfilzen	10 km Sprint	World Cup	2nd
29	2020–21	12 December 2020	(Austria) Hochfilzen	12.5 km Pursuit	World Cup	1st
30	2020–21	22 January 2021	(Italy) Antholz-Anterselva	20 km Individual	World Cup	3rd
31	2020–21	24 January 2021	(Italy) Antholz-Anterselva	15 km Mass Start	World Cup	2nd
32	2020–21	21 February 2021	(Slovenia) Pokljuka	15 km Mass Start	World Championships	3rd
33	2020–21	11 March 2021	(Czech Republic) Nové Město	10 km Sprint	World Cup	1st
34	2020–21	13 March 2021	(Czech Republic) Nové Město	12.5 km Pursuit	World Cup	1st
35	2021–22	2 December 2021	(Sweden) Östersund	10 km Sprint	World Cup	3rd
36	2021–22	11 December 2021	(Austria) Hochfilzen	12.5 km Pursuit	World Cup	1st
37	2021–22	18 December 2021	(France) Annecy-Le Grand-Bornand	12.5 km Pursuit	World Cup	1st
38	2021–22	19 December 2021	(France) Annecy-Le Grand-Bornand	15 km Mass Start	World Cup	2nd
39	2021–22	9 January 2022	(Germany) Oberhof	12.5 km Pursuit	World Cup	1st
40	2021–22	13 January 2022	(Germany) Ruhpolding	10 km Sprint	World Cup	1st
41	2021–22	16 January 2022	(Germany) Ruhpolding	12.5 km Pursuit	World Cup	1st
42	2021–22	8 February 2022	(China) Beijing	20 km Individual	Olympic Games	1st
43	2021–22	12 February 2022	(China) Beijing	10 km Sprint	Olympic Games	2nd
44	2021–22	13 February 2022	(China) Beijing	12.5 km Pursuit	Olympic Games	1st
45	2021–22	5 March 2022	(Finland) Kontiolahti	10 km Sprint	World Cup	1st
46	2021–22	6 March 2022	(Finland) Kontiolahti	12.5 km Pursuit	World Cup	1st
47	2021–22	10 March 2022	(Estonia) Otepää	10 km Sprint	World Cup	1st
48	2021–22	12 March 2022	(Estonia) Otepää	15 km Mass Start	World Cup	2nd
49	2021–22	18 March 2022	(Norway) Oslo Holmenkollen	10 km Sprint	World Cup	2nd
50	2021–22	19 March 2022	(Norway) Oslo Holmenkollen	12.5 km Pursuit	World Cup	2nd
51	2022–23	7 January 2023	(Slovenia) Pokljuka	12.5 km Pursuit	World Cup	2nd
52	2022–23	18 March 2023	(Norway) Oslo Holmenkollen	12.5 km Pursuit	World Cup	2nd
53	2023–24	18 February 2024	(Czech Republic) Nové Město	15 km Mass Start	World Championships	3rd
54	2024–25	8 December 2024	(Finland) Kontiolahti	15 km Mass Start	World Cup	2nd
55	2024–25	10 January 2025	(Germany) Oberhof	10 km Sprint	World Cup	1st
56	2024–25	15 February 2025	(Switzerland) Lenzerheide	10 km Sprint	World Championships	3rd
57	2024–25	19 February 2025	(Switzerland) Lenzerheide	20 km Individual	World Championships	3rd
58	2024–25	15 March 2025	(Slovenia) Pokljuka	15 km Mass Start	World Cup	2nd
59	2024–25	22 March 2025	(Norway) Oslo Holmenkollen	12.5 km Pursuit	World Cup	3rd
60	2025–26	6 December 2025	(Sweden) Östersund	10 km Sprint	World Cup	3rd
61	2025–26	7 December 2025	(Sweden) Östersund	12.5 km Pursult	World Cup	1st
62	2025–26	13 February 2026	(Italy) Antholz-Anterselva	10 km Sprint	Olympic Games	1st
63	2025–26	20 February 2026	(Italy) Antholz-Anterselva	15 km Mass Start	Olympic Games	3rd

*Results are from IBU races which include the Biathlon World Cup, Biathlon World Championships and the Winter Olympic Games.

Relay victories

- 20 victories

No.	Season	Date	Location	Discipline	Level	Team
1	2015–16	3 March 2016	(Norway) Oslo Holmenkollen	Mixed Relay	Biathlon World Championships	Bescond / Dorin Habert / Fillon Maillet / Fourcade
2	2016–17	11 December 2016	(Slovenia) Pokljuka	Relay	Biathlon World Cup	Béatrix / Fillon Maillet / Desthieux / Fourcade
3	2016–17	12 March 2017	(Finland) Kontiolahti	Mixed Relay	Biathlon World Cup	Dorin Habert / Bescond / Desthieux / Fillon Maillet
4	2018–19	17 February 2019	(United States) Salt Lake City	Mixed Relay	Biathlon World Cup	Fillon Maillet / Desthieux / Aymonier / Chevalier
5	2019–20	18 January 2020	(Germany) Ruhpolding	Relay	Biathlon World Cup	Jacquelin / Fourcade / Desthieux / Fillon Maillet
6	2019–20	25 January 2020	(Slovenia) Pokljuka	Mixed Relay	Biathlon World Cup	Fillon Maillet / Desthieux / Braisaz / Simon
7	2019–20	22 February 2020	(Italy) Antholz-Anterselva	Relay	Biathlon World Championships	Jacquelin / Fourcade / Desthieux / Fillon Maillet
8	2020–21	15 January 2021	(Germany) Oberhof	Relay	Biathlon World Cup	Desthieux / Fillon Maillet / Claude / Jacquelin
9	2020–21	23 January 2021	(Italy) Antholz-Anterselva	Relay	Biathlon World Cup	Guigonnat / Fillon Maillet / Desthieux / Jacquelin
10	2022–23	8 January 2023	(Slovenia) Pokljuka	Mixed Relay	Biathlon World Cup	Claude / Fillon Maillet / Chevalier / Simon
11	2022–23	18 February 2023	(Germany) Oberhof	Relay	Biathlon World Championships	Guigonnat / Claude / Jacquelin / Fillon Maillet
12	2023–24	25 November 2023	(Sweden) Östersund	Mixed Relay	Biathlon World Cup	Fillon Maillet / Jacquelin / Braisaz / Jeanmonnot
13	2023–24	7 February 2024	(Czech Republic) Nové Město	Mixed Relay	Biathlon World Championships	Perrot / Fillon Maillet / Braisaz / Simon
14	2023–24	15 February 2024	(Czech Republic) Nové Město	Single Mixed Relay	Biathlon World Championships	Fillon Maillet / Jeanmonnot
15	2023–24	3 March 2024	(Norway) Oslo Holmenkollen	Mixed Relay	Biathlon World Cup	Simon / Chauveau / Claude / Fillon Maillet
16	2024–25	1 December 2024	(Finland) Kontiolahti	Relay	Biathlon World Cup	Claude / Fillon Maillet / Perrot / Jacquelin
17	2024–25	15 December 2024	(Austria) Hochfilzen	Relay	Biathlon World Cup	Claude / Fillon Maillet / Perrot / Jacquelin
18	2025–26	15 January 2026	(Germany) Ruhpolding	Relay	Biathlon World Cup	Claude / Lombardot / Fillon Maillet / Perrot
19	2025–26	8 February 2026	(Italy) Antholz-Anterselva	Mixed Relay	Olympic Games	Perrot / Fillon Maillet / Jeanmonnot / Simon
20	2025–26	17 February 2026	(Italy) Antholz-Anterselva	Relay	Olympic Games	Claude / Jacquelin / Fillon Maillet / Perrot

Podiums

(World Cup + World Championships + Olympic Games)

Result	Individual	Sprint	Pursuit	Mass Start	Relay	Mixed Relay	Total		
Result	Individual	Sprint	Pursuit	Mass Start	Relay	Mixed Relay	Individual events	Team events	All events
1st place	1	4	9	2	6	5	16	11	27
2nd place	1	6	7	7	11	2	21	13	34
3rd place	2	5	5	3	10	3	15	13	28
Podiums	4	15	21	12	27	10	52	37	89

(Statistics as of 19 March 2023.)

=== Junior World Championships ===
Event	Individual	Sprint	Pursuit	Relay
(Czech Republic) 2011 Nové Město	67th	20th	11th	8th
(Austria) 2013 Obertilliach	11th	5th	4th	Silver

== See also ==
- List of multiple Olympic gold medalists
- List of multiple Winter Olympic medalists
