= Deedra Irwin =

American biathlete (born 1992)

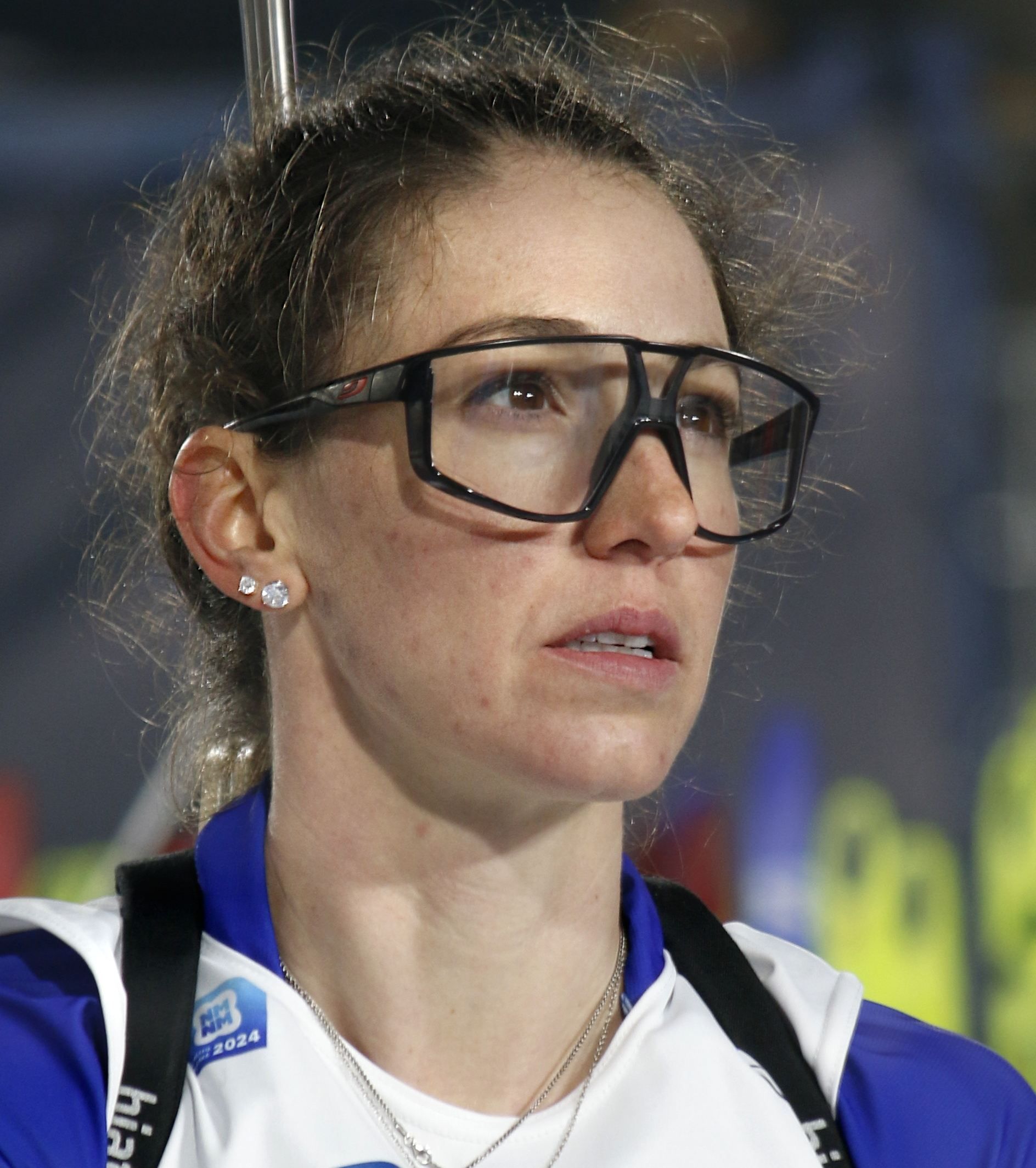
- Deedra Irwin during 2024 World Championships in Nové Město, Czechia

Personal information
- Nationality: United States
- Born: 27 May 1992 (age 34) Pulaski, Wisconsin

Sport

Professional information
- Sport: Biathlon
- World Cup debut: 2021

Olympic Games
- Teams: 2 (2022, 2026 )

World Championships
- Teams: 3 (2021, 2023, 2024)

Deedra Irwin (born 27 May 1992 in Pulaski, Wisconsin) is an American biathlete. She competed at the 2022 Winter Olympics in women's mass start, women's relay, women's pursuit, women's individual, and women's sprint. She finished 7th in the women's individual event, which is the highest ever placing for a United States athlete in any international biathlon championship.

She graduated from the Michigan Technological University. She is a sergeant in the Vermont Army National Guard.

She competed at the Biathlon World Championships 2021 in the team relay. She competed at the Biathlon World Championships 2023 in the mixed relay, women's sprint, women's pursuit, women's individual, single mixed relay, and women's relay.

== Biathlon results ==
All results are sourced from the International Biathlon Union.

=== Olympic Games ===
Event	Individual	Sprint	Pursuit	Mass start	Relay	Mixed relay
(China) 2022 Beijing	7th	37th	47th	23rd	11th	—
(Italy) 2026 Milano Cortina	34th	47th	35th	—	18th	14th

=== World Championships ===
Event	Individual	Sprint	Pursuit	Mass start	Relay	Mixed relay	Single mixed relay
(Slovenia) 2021 Pokljuka	—	51st	45th	—	13th	—	—
(Germany) 2023 Oberhof	20th	55th	57th	—	15th	13th	11th
(Czech Republic) 2024 Nové Město	11th	39th	46th	—	21st	11th	7th
(Switzerland) 2025 Lenzerheide	29th	63rd	—	—	19th	19th	16th

==== World Cup Team podiums ====
- No Victories
- 1 podiums (1 Mixed)

No.	Season	Date	Location	Race	Place	Teammate(s)
1	2025-26	15 March 2026	(Estonia) Otepää	Mixed Relay	3rd	Maxime Germain, Campbell Wright, Margie Freed
