= Krešimir Crnković =

Croatian biathlete and cross-country skier

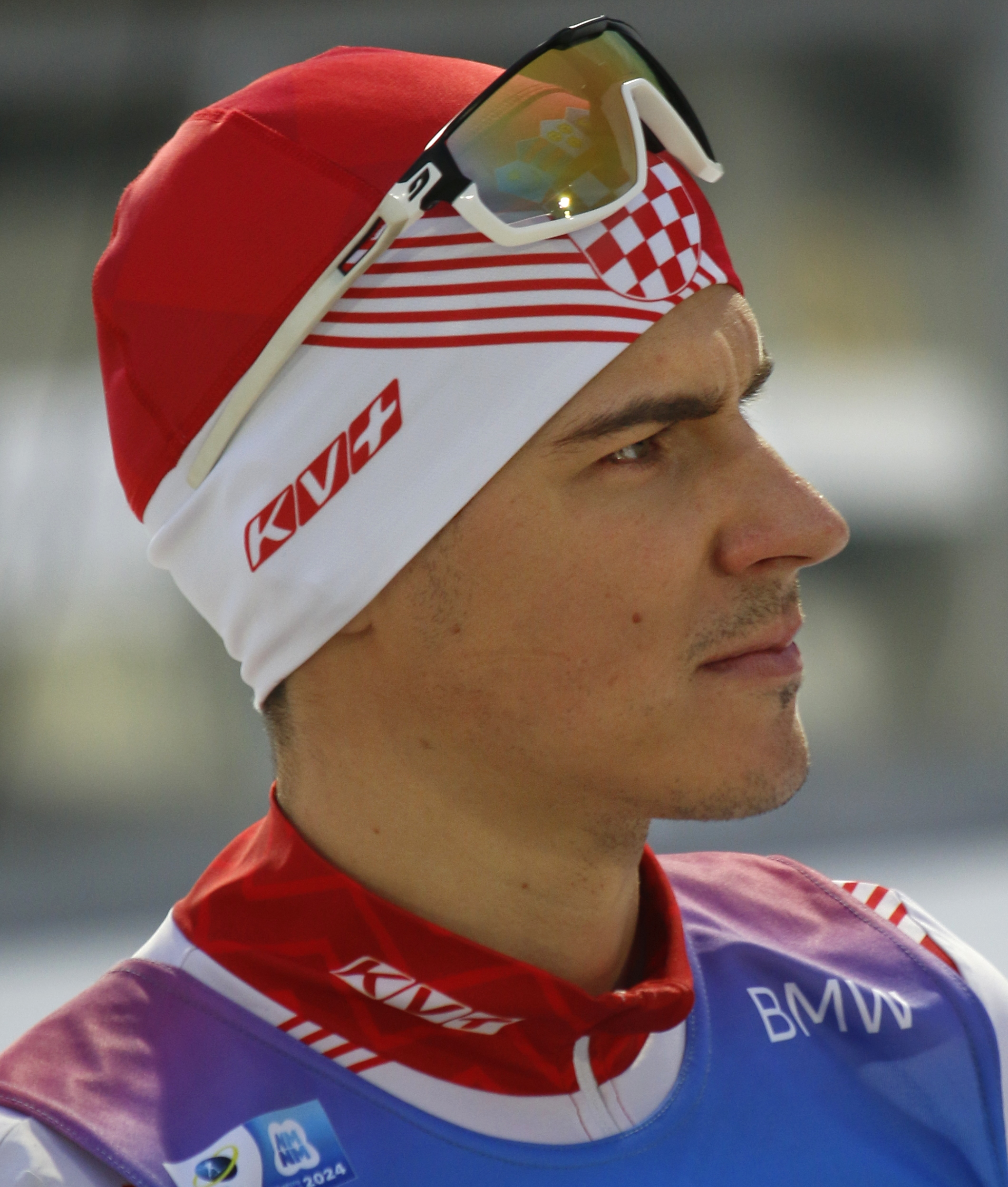
- Crnković in 2024

Personal information
- Born: 4 January 1995 (age 31) Rijeka, Croatia
- Height: 181 cm (5 ft 11 in)
- Weight: 72 kg (159 lb)

Sport
- Country: Croatia
- Sport: Biathlon; Cross-country skiing
- Club: BK Brod Moravice

Krešimir Crnković (Croatian pronunciation: [krěʃimir tsř̩ːŋkoʋitɕ]; born 4 January 1995) is a Croatian biathlete and cross-country skier who competes internationally.

He participated in cross-country skiing at the 2018 Winter Olympics. and in biathlon at the 2026 Winter Olympics.

== Results ==
All results are sourced from the International Biathlon Union and the International Ski and Snowboard Federation.

=== World Championships Biathlon ===
0 medals

Event	Individual	Sprint	Pursuit	Mass start	Relay	Mixed relay	Single Mixed relay
(Norway) 2016 Oslo	—	83rd	—	—	—	—	—
(Austria) 2017 Hochfilzen	96th	83rd	—	—	—	—	—
(Italy) 2020 Antholz-Anterselva	76th	83rd	—	—	—	—	28th
(Slovenia) 2021 Pokljuka	91st	60th	—	—	—	—	28th
(Germany) 2023 Oberhof	75th	75th	—	—	—	—	26th
(Czech Republic) 2024 Nové Město na Moravě	71st	81st	—	—	—	—	25th
(Switzerland) 2025 Lenzerheide	44th	75th	—	—	—	—	25th

*During Olympic seasons competitions are only held for those events not included in the Olympic program.
**The single mixed relay was added as an event in 2019.

=== Olympic Winter Games Cross-country Skiing ===
0 medals

Event	Sprint	15 km Individual	30 km Skiathlon	50 km Mass Start	4 x 10 km Relay	Team Sprint
(South Korea) 2018 Winter Olympics	—	55th	44th	—	—	—

=== World Championships Cross-country Skiing ===
0 medals

Event	Sprint	15 km Individual	30 km Skiathlon	50 km Mass start	4 x 10 km Relay	Team Sprint
(Finland) 2017 Lahti	79th	—	—	—	—	—
(Germany) 2021 Oberstdorf	88th	58th	—	—	—	24th
