= Lisa Theresa Hauser =

Austrian biathlete (born 1993)

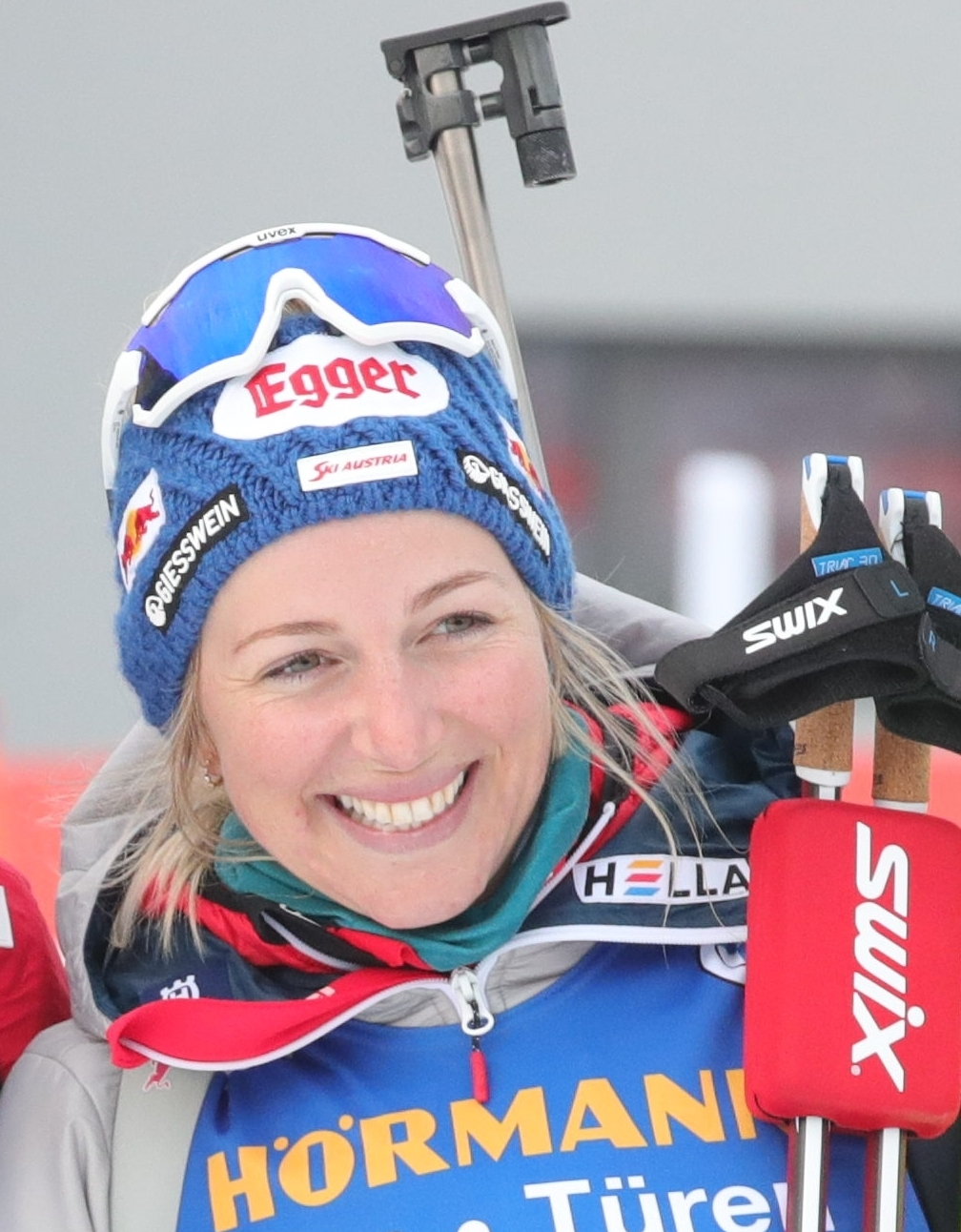
- Hauser in 2023

Personal information
- Full name: Lisa Theresa Hauser
- Nationality: Austrian
- Born: 16 December 1993 (age 32) Kitzbühel, Austria
- Height: 1.74 m (5 ft 9 in)
- Weight: 65 kg (143 lb)

Sport
- Coached by: Markus Fischer; Gerald Hönig

Professional information
- Sport: Biathlon
- Club: Kitzbühler Ski Club
- World Cup debut: 2013

Olympic Games
- Teams: 4 (2014, 2018, 2022, 2026)
- Medals: 0 (0 gold)

World Championships
- Teams: 10 (2013–2025)
- Medals: 4 (1 gold)

World Cup
- Seasons: 13 (2013/14–2025/26)
- Individual victories: 6
- All victories: 8
- Individual podiums: 13
- All podiums: 25
- Discipline titles: 1: 1 Individual (2020-21)
Medal record
Women's biathlon
Representing Austria
World Championships
Gold medal – first place	2021 Pokljuka	12.5 km mass start
Silver medal – second place	2021 Pokljuka	10 km pursuit
Silver medal – second place	2021 Pokljuka	Mixed relay
Silver medal – second place	2023 Oberhof	Single mixed relay
Junior World Championships
Silver medal – second place	2013 Obertilliach	12.5 km individual
Silver medal – second place	2014 Presque Isle	12.5 km individual
Bronze medal – third place	2013 Obertilliach	7.5 km sprint
Bronze medal – third place	2014 Presque Isle	3 × 6 km relay
Youth World Championships
Bronze medal – third place	2012 Kontiolahti	6 km sprint
Bronze medal – third place	2012 Kontiolahti	3 × 6 km relay

Lisa Theresa Hauser (born 16 December 1993) is an Austrian biathlete. She competed at the Biathlon World Championships 2013, and at the 2014 Winter Olympics in Sochi, sprint, pursuit and individual. She reached her first individual podium in the 2020–21 season in the Stage 5 sprint competition in Oberhof, finishing 3rd, and won the women's Mass Start at the Biathlon World Championships 2021.

== Biathlon results ==
All results are sourced from the International Biathlon Union.

=== Olympic Games ===
Event	Individual	Sprint	Pursuit	Mass start	Relay	Mixed Relay
(Russia) 2014 Sochi	36th	27th	39th	–	–	9th
(South Korea) 2018 Pyeongchang	41st	62nd	–	–	–	10th
(China) 2022 Beijing	17th	4th	7th	11th	9th	10th
(Italy) 2026 Milano Cortina	27th	30th	29th	26th	15th	7th

=== World Championships ===
4 medals (1 gold, 3 silver)

Event	Individual	Sprint	Pursuit	Mass start	Relay	Mixed Relay	Single Mixed Relay
(Czech Republic) 2013 Nové Město	–	–	–	–	19th	–	—N/a
(Finland) 2015 Kontiolahti	26th	24th	21st	13th	10th	5th	—N/a
(Norway) 2016 Oslo	13th	16th	20th	21st	12th	5th	—N/a
(Austria) 2017 Hochfilzen	61st	23rd	26th	25th	DSQ	9th	—N/a
(Sweden) 2019 Östersund	7th	70th	–	–	16th	–	8th
(Italy) 2020 Antholz-Anterselva	51st	17th	8th	9th	12th	8th	6th
(Slovenia) 2021 Pokljuka	4th	9th	Silver	Gold	7th	Silver	6th
(Germany) 2023 Oberhof	32nd	13th	27th	9th	5th	4th	Silver
(Czech Republic) 2024 Nové Město	22nd	34th	22nd	6th	8th	—	9th
(Switzerland) 2025 Lenzerheide	30th	26th	15th	12th	4th	—	8th

=== World Cup ===
Season	Overall		Individual		Sprint		Pursuit		Mass start	
Season	Points	Position	Points	Position	Points	Position	Points	Position	Points	Position
2013–14	36	69th	17	35th	13	78th	6	73rd	–	–
2014–15	338	24th	34	29th	105	31st	93	26th	106	16th
2015–16	479	15th	62	15th	161	18th	159	16th	97	17th
2016–17	496	15th	69	12th	143	20th	191	13th	93	21st
2017–18	260	29th	24	30th	91	30th	119	18th	26	37th
2018–19	488	17th	94	5th	141	23rd	167	13th	86	23rd
2019–20	352	18th	39	27th	141	17th	47	36th	125	14th
2020–21	818	6th	103	1st	256	8th	224	6th	171	6th
2021–22	684	3rd	86	2nd	300	4th	222	5th	95	12th
2022–23	604	10th	41	21st	231	7th	176	10th	156	6th
2023–24	184	33rd	59	14th	53	40th	72	31st	–	–
2024–25	496	11th	72	12th	130	18th	143	11th	151	9th
2025–26	356	18th	13	59th	102	23rd	168	13th	73	20th

=== World Cup podiums ===
World Championship podiums highlighted in green.

==== Individual Podiums ====
No.	Season	Date	Location	Discipline	Position
1	2020/21	8 January 2021	(Germany) Oberhof	7.5 km Sprint	3rd
2	2020/21	9 January 2021	(Germany) Oberhof	10 km Pursuit	3rd
3	2020/21	14 January 2021	(Germany) Oberhof	7.5 km Sprint	3rd
4	2020/21	21 January 2021	(Italy) Antholz-Anterselva	15 km Individual	1st
5	2020/21	23 January 2021	(Italy) Antholz-Anterselva	12.5 km Mass start	3rd
6	2020/21	14 February 2021	(Slovenia) Pokljuka	10 km Pursuit	2nd
7	2020/21	21 February 2021	(Slovenia) Pokljuka	12.5 km Mass start	1st
8	2021/22	27 November 2021	(Sweden) Östersund	15 km Individual	2nd
9	2021/22	2 December 2021	(Sweden) Östersund	7,5 km Sprint	1st
10	2021/22	18 March 2022	(Norway) Oslo	7,5 km Sprint	2nd
11	2022/23	3 December 2022	(Finland) Kontiolahti	7,5 km Sprint	1st
12	2022/23	18 December 2022	(France) Annecy-Le Grand-Bornand	12,5 km Mass start	1st
13	2025/26	7 December 2025	(Sweden) Östersund	10 km Pursult	1st

==== Team Podiums ====
No.	Season	Date	Location	Discipline	Position
1	2015/16	7 February 2016	(Canada) Canmore	Single Mixed Relay	2nd
2	2016/17	27 November 2016	(Sweden) Östersund	Single Mixed Relay	2nd
3	2016/17	12 March 2017	(Finland) Kontiolahti	Single Mixed Relay	1st
4	2017/18	26 November 2017	(Sweden) Östersund	Single Mixed Relay	1st
5	2017/18	10 March 2018	(Finland) Kontiolahti	Single Mixed Relay	2nd
6	2018/19	2 December 2018	(Slovenia) Pokljuka	Single Mixed Relay	2nd
7	2018/19	17 February 2019	(United States) Salt Lake City	Single Mixed Relay	2nd
8	2019/20	25 January 2020	(Slovenia) Pokljuka	Single Mixed Relay	3rd
9	2020/21	10 February 2021	(Slovenia) Pokljuka	Mixed Relay	2nd
10	2021/22	8 January 2022	(Germany) Oberhof	Single Mixed Relay	2nd
11	2022/23	16 February 2023	(Germany) Oberhof	Single Mixed Relay	2nd
12	2023/24	20 January 2024	(Italy) Antholz-Anterselva	Single Mixed Relay	3rd

=== Junior World Championships ===
Event	Individual	Sprint	Pursuit	Relay
(Austria) 2013 Obertilliach	Silver	Bronze	7th	8th
(United States) 2014 Presque Isle	Silver	17th	12th	Bronze
