= Anastasia Tolmacheva =

Russian-Romanian biathlete (born 1995)

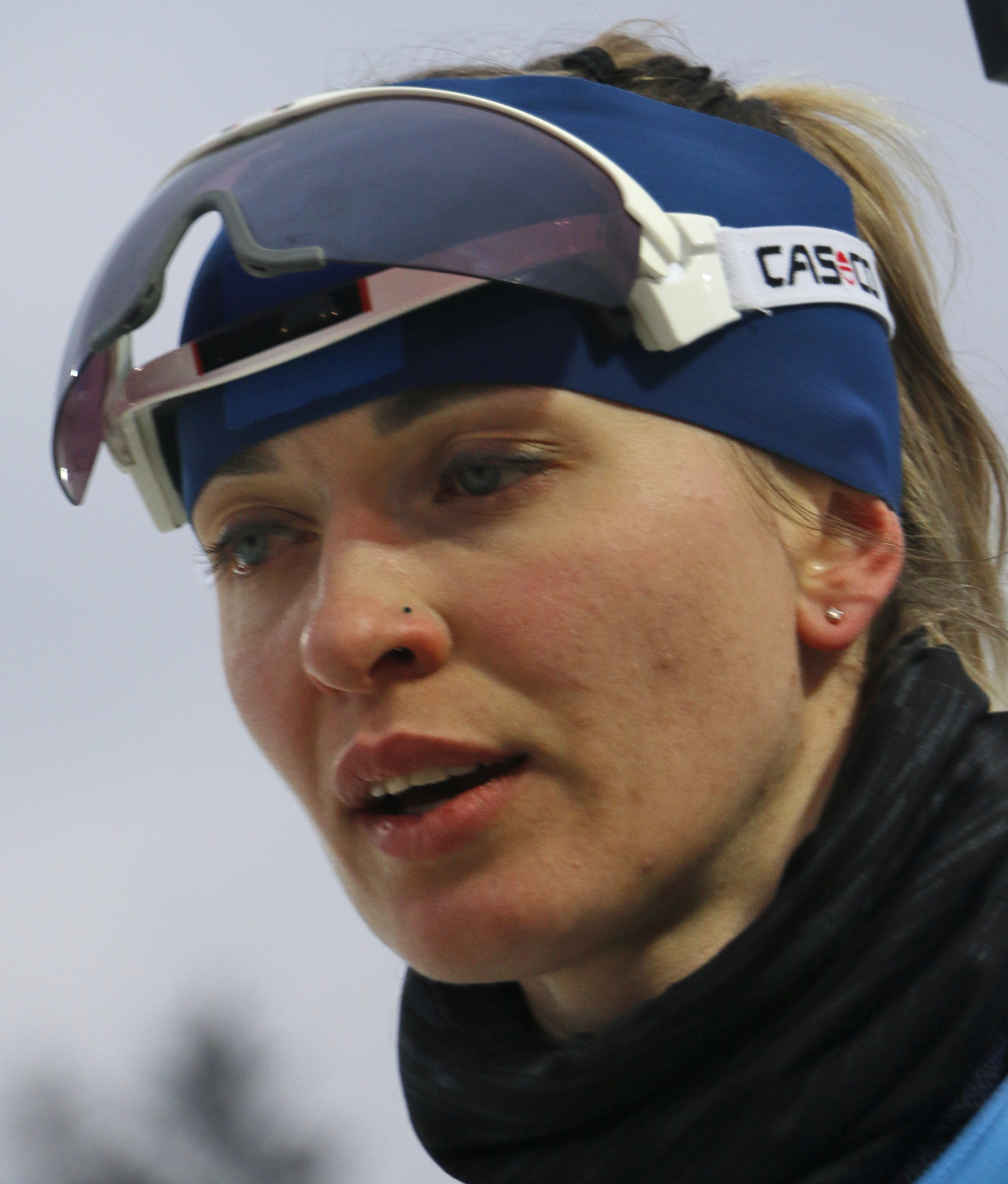
- Tolmacheva in 2023

Personal information
- Nationality: Russian, Romanian
- Born: 29 September 1995 (age 30) Muromtsevo, Russia

Sport
- Country: Romania
- Sport: Biathlon

Anastasia Tolmacheva (born 29 September 1995) is a Russian-born Romanian biathlete. She has competed in the Biathlon World Cup since 2020.

== Career ==
In 2013, she took part in the European Youth Olympic Festival in Brașov, came fifth in the individual race and 22nd in the sprint. At the 2017 Russian Championships, she won two bronze medals in the super sprint and marathon. In 2018, she expressed her desire to leave the Russian national team and compete for Moldova, but was refused by the Moldovan national team. On 23 August 2020, it became known that Tolmacheva, along with Elena Chirkova and Anatoly Oskin, will represent Romania at international competitions. She is included in the main squad of the Romanian national team and competes at World Championships and European Championships.

== Biathlon results ==
All results are sourced from the International Biathlon Union.

=== Olympic Games ===
0 medals

Event	Individual	Sprint	Pursuit	Mass start	Relay	Mixed relay
(Italy) 2026 Milano Cortina	72nd	59th	56th	—	—	—

=== World Championships ===
Event	Individual	Sprint	Pursuit	Mass start	Relay	Mixed relay	Single mixed relay
(Germany) 2023 Oberhof	51st	32nd	47th	—	—	20th	23rd
(Czech Republic) 2024 Nové Město	38th	75th	—	—	—	23rd	20th
(Switzerland) 2025 Lenzerheide	51st	59th	42nd	—	18th	21st	19th

=== World Cup ===
Season	Overall			Individual		Sprint		Pursuit		Mass start	
Season	Races	Points	Position	Points	Position	Points	Position	Points	Position	Points	Position
2020–21	4/26	Didn't earn World Cup points									
2021–22	10/22	Didn't earn World Cup points									
2022–23	11/21	5	85th	—	—	5	75th	—	—	—	—
2023–24	9/21	7	86th	—	—	7	78th	—	—	—	—
