= Lotte Lie =

Belgian biathlete (born 1995)

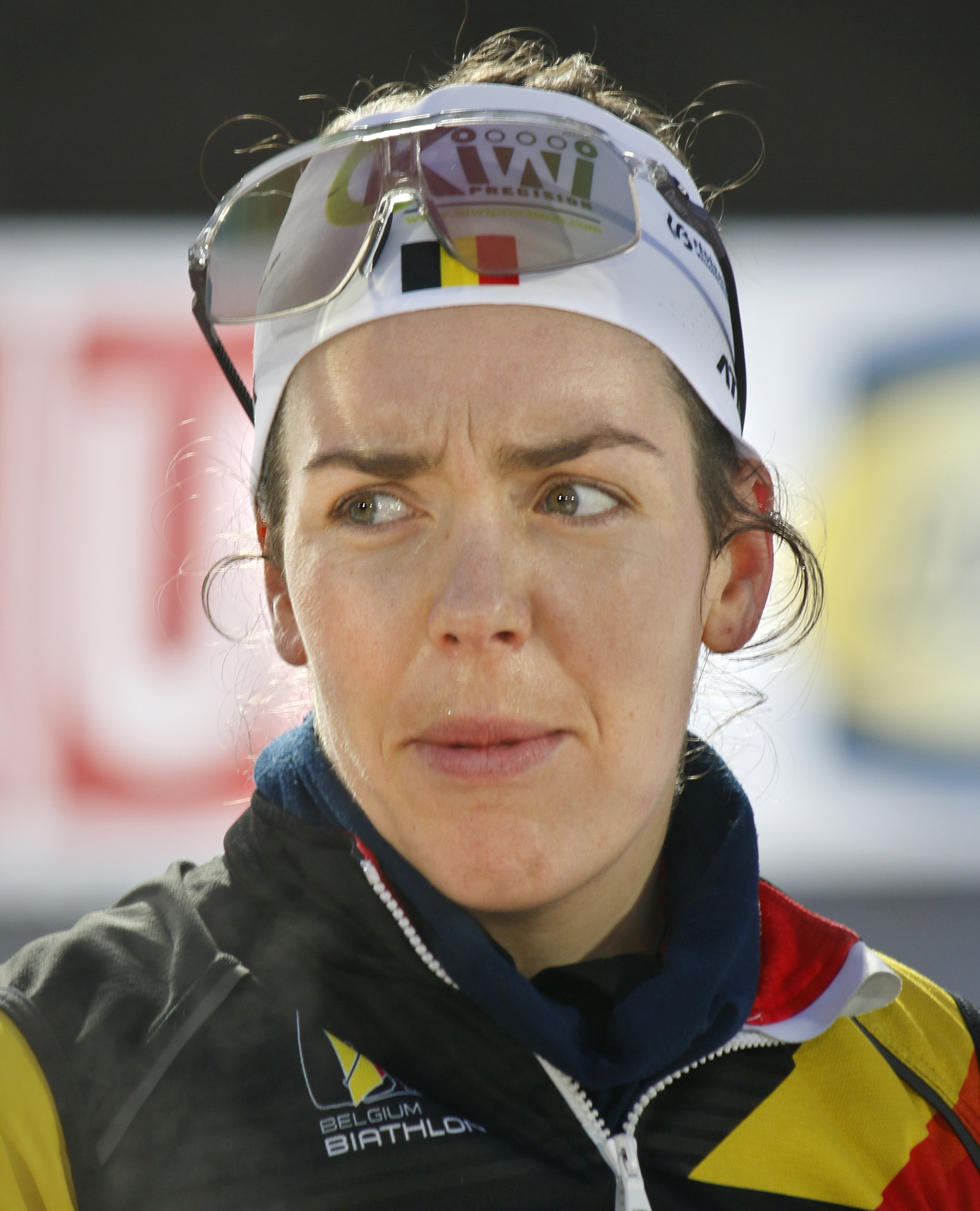
- Lie in 2024

Personal information
- Nationality: Belgian
- Born: 6 September 1995 (age 30) Levanger, Norway
- Height: 172 cm (5 ft 8 in)
- Weight: 69 kg (152 lb)

Sport

Professional information
- Sport: Biathlon
- IBU Cup debut: 2017
- World Cup debut: 2020

World Championships
- Teams: 3 (2020, 2021, 2023)

World Cup
- Seasons: 5 (2019/20-)

European/IBU Cup
- Seasons: 3 (2017/18-2019/20)
Medal record
Women's biathlon
Representing Belgium

Lotte Lie (born 6 September 1995) is a Norwegian-born Belgian biathlete. She has competed in the Biathlon World Cup since 2020.

== Personal life ==
Lie was born in Norway to a Norwegian father and Belgian mother and holds dual-citizenship. She opted to represent Belgium internationally in 2019.

== Biathlon results ==
All results are sourced from the International Biathlon Union.

=== Olympic Games ===
Event	Individual	Sprint	Pursuit	Mass start	Relay	Mixed relay
Representing Belgium
(China) 2022 Beijing	45th	64th	—	—	—	—
(Italy) 2026 Milano Cortina	19th	39th	47th	—	13th	18th

=== World Championships ===
Event	Individual	Sprint	Pursuit	Mass start	Relay	Mixed relay	Single mixed relay
Representing Belgium
(Italy) 2020 Antholz-Anterselva	45th	60th	LAP	—	—	25th	20th
(Slovenia) 2021 Pokljuka	36th	47th	43rd	—	—	21st	15th
(Germany) 2023 Oberhof	70th	21st	35th	14th	—	—	17th
(Czech Republic) 2024 Nové Město na Moravě	18th	27th	20th	14th	14th	8th	16th
(Switzerland) 2025 Lenzerheide	14th	29th	14th	18th	13th	10th	13th

=== World Cup ===
Season	Age	Overall			Individual		Sprint		Pursuit		Mass start	
Season	Age	Races	Points	Position	Points	Position	Points	Position	Points	Position	Points	Position
2019–20	24	5/21	Did not earn World Cup points									
2020–21	25	18/26	14	83rd	5	62nd	4	86th	5	70th	—	—
2021–22	26	20/22	258	28th	32	20th	64	38th	87	27th	75	20th
2022–23	27	13/20	116	41st	31	26th	46	46th	39	42nd	—	—
2023–24	28	17/21	244	28th	43	24th	113	20th	54	37th	34	30th
2024–25	29	20/21	349	22nd	41	29th	205	26th	111	19th	92	18th
