= David Komatz =

Austrian biathlete (born 1991)

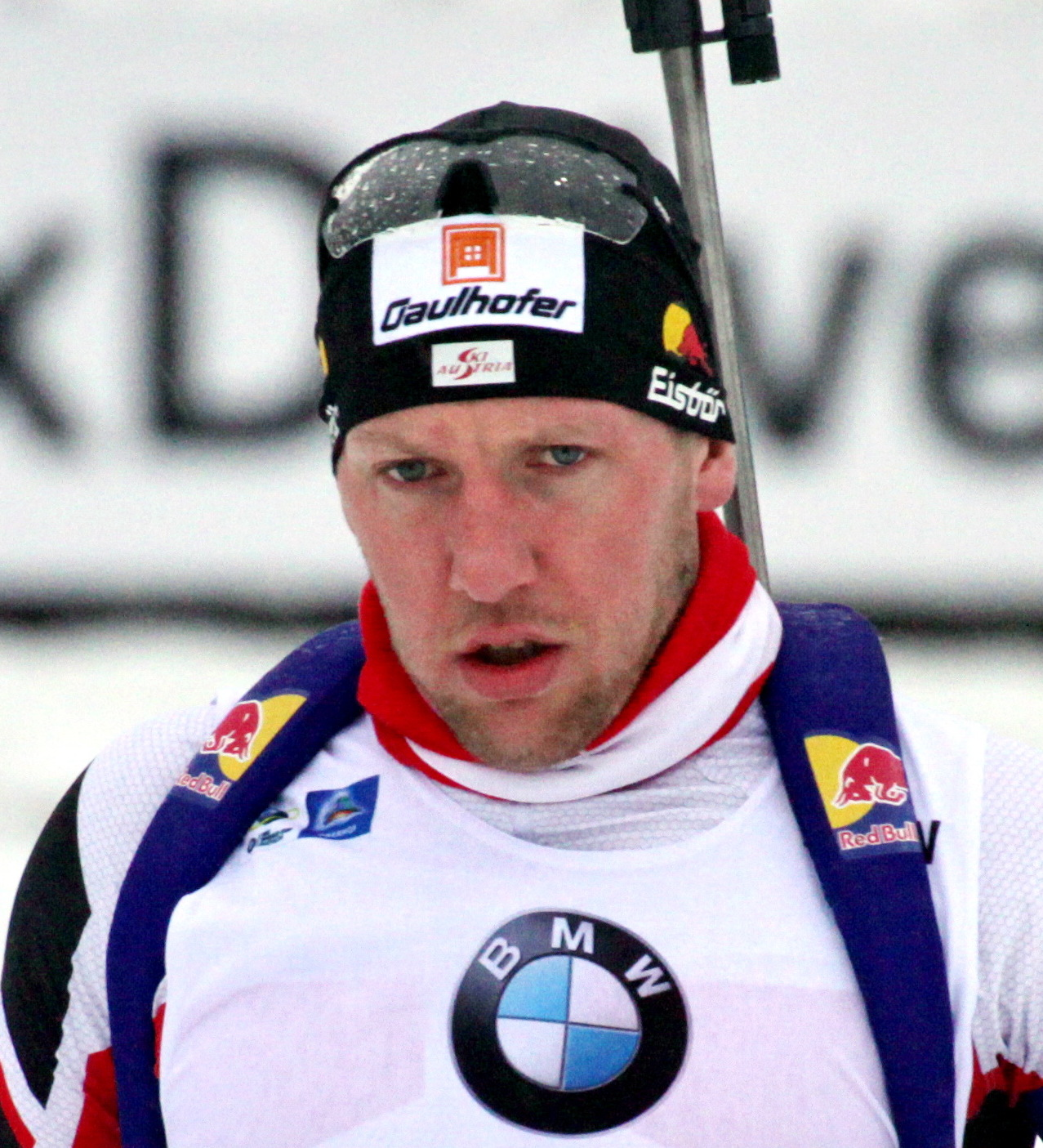
- Komatz in 2018

Personal information
- Nationality: Austrian
- Born: 10 December 1991 (age 34) Rottenmann, Austria

Sport

Professional information
- Sport: Biathlon
- Club: ATV Aigen-Irdning
- World Cup debut: 2013

World Championships
- Teams: 2 (2021, 2023)
- Medals: 2 (0 gold)

World Cup
- Seasons: 5 (2013/14–2016/17, 2020/21–)
- Individual victories: 0
- All victories: 0
- Individual podiums: 0
- All podiums: 1
- Overall titles: 0
- Discipline titles: 0
Medal record
Men's biathlon
Representing Austria
World Championships
Silver medal – second place	2021 Pokljuka	Mixed relay
Silver medal – second place	2023 Oberhof	Single mixed relay
European Championships
Gold medal – first place	2014 Nové Město	4 x 7.5 km relay
Bronze medal – third place	2014 Nové Město	10 km sprint

David Komatz (born 10 December 1991) is an Austrian biathlete. He has competed in the Biathlon World Cup since 2013, and represented Austria at the Biathlon World Championships 2016 and Biathlon World Championships 2021.

At the 2021 World Championships he won the silver medal in the mixed relay.

== Career ==
=== Olympic Games ===
0 medals

Event	Individual	Sprint	Pursuit	Mass start	Relay	Mixed relay
(China) 2022 Beijing	45th	69th	—	—	10th	—

=== World Championships ===
2 medals (2 silver)

Event	Individual	Sprint	Pursuit	Mass start	Relay	Mixed relay	Single mixed relay
(Norway) 2016 Oslo Holmenkollen	41st	—	—	—	—	—	—N/a
(Slovenia) 2021 Pokljuka	48th	37th	23rd	—	10th	Silver	—
(Germany) 2023 Oberhof	24th	13th	27th	24th	14th	—	Silver
(Czech Republic) 2024 Nové Město na Moravě	34th	29th	30th	21st	12th	6th	—
(Switzerland) 2025 Lenzerheide	26th	49th	49th	—	12th	17th	—

*During Olympic seasons competitions are only held for those events not included in the Olympic program.
**The single mixed relay was added as an event in 2019.
