= Florent Claude =

French-Belgian biathlete (born 1991)

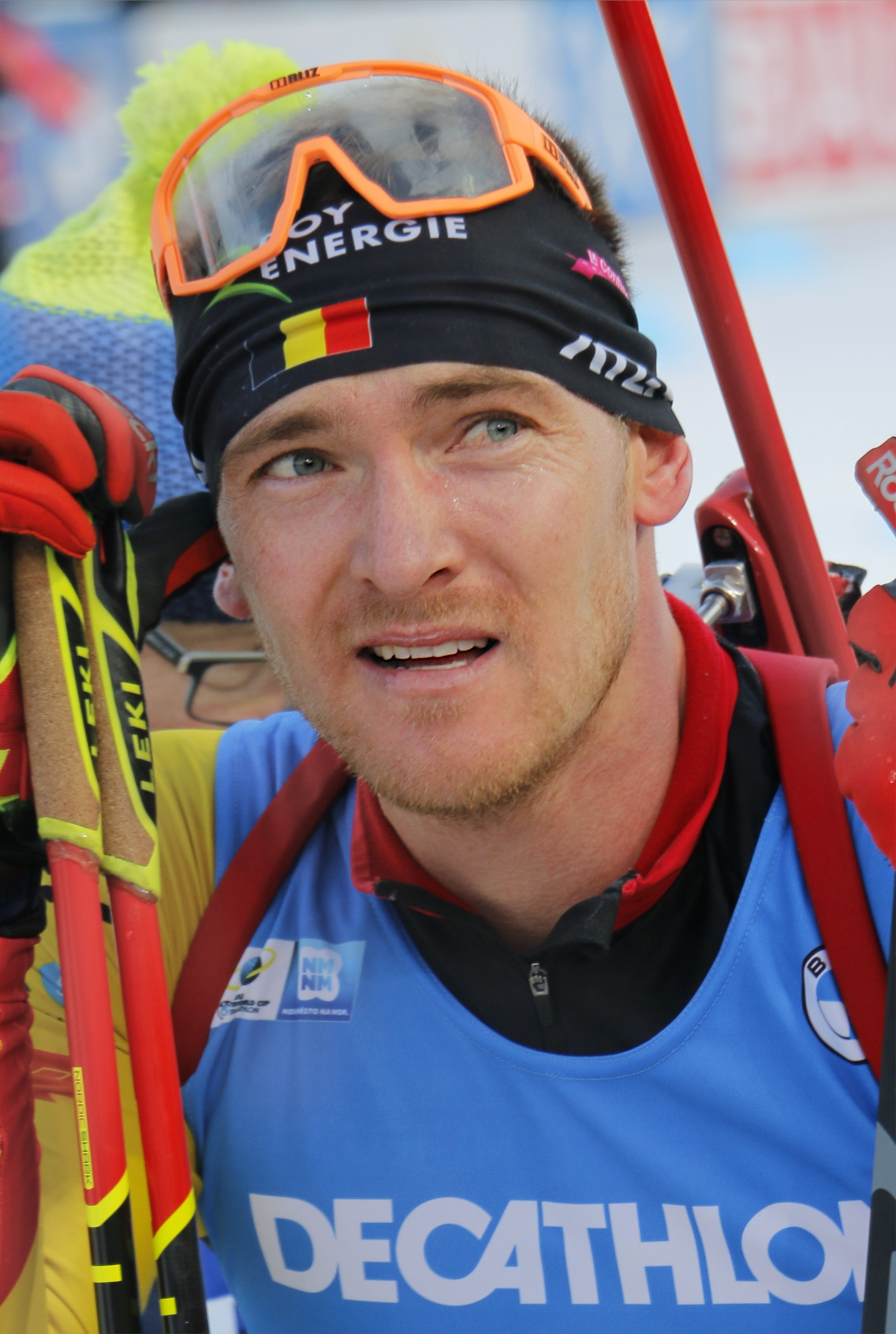
- Florent Claude in 2023

Personal information
- Nationality: Belgian
- Born: 11 November 1991 (age 34) Remiremont, France

Sport
- Country: France (up to 2016); Belgium (from 2017)
- Sport: Biathlon
Medal record
Men's biathlon
Representing France
Junior World Championships
Silver medal – second place	2012 Kontiolahti	10 km sprint
Bronze medal – third place	2012 Kontiolahti	4 × 7.5 km relay
Youth World Championships
Gold medal – first place	2009 Canmore	3 × 7.5 km relay
Silver medal – second place	2010 Torsby	3 × 7.5 km relay

Florent Claude (born 11 November 1991) is a French-born Belgian biathlete.

== Biography ==
Florent Claude is originally a French biathlete, born in Remiremont, in the Vosges, in 1991. He has a Master in physical training from the Université Grenoble Alpes. Due to a lack of chances to compete at the highest biathlon level in France, he relocated to Belgium, where he formed a team with Michael Rösch, another naturalized experienced biathlete (Olympic gold medal in the relay in 2006 with Germany). In June 2017 Claude acquired the Belgian nationality. His brothers Fabien Claude and Emilien Claude are also biathletes and compete for France.

In 2018, Claude competed at the 2018 Winter Olympics with Michael Rösch as the first Belgian Olympic biathletes ever. Their relay teammate Thierry Langer also competed but as a cross-country skier, not a biathlete as the men's relay team failed to qualify for the Olympics. But at the 2022 Winter Olympics, Belgium did qualify and fielded for the first time ever a team in the men's biathlon, and Claude competed in both individual events and the men's team relay event. Four years later, Belgium qualified and fielded a full men's and women's biathlon team for the first time in its winter sports history, and Claude competed in both individual events, the men's team relay event and the mixed team relay event.

== Biathlon results ==
All results are sourced from the International Biathlon Union.

=== Olympic Games ===
Event	Individual	Sprint	Pursuit	Mass start	Relay	Mixed relay
(South Korea) 2018 Pyeongchang	54th	55th	57th	—	—	—
(China) 2022 Beijing	75th	84th	—	—	20th	—
(Italy) 2026 Milano Cortina	46th	38th	50th	—	19th	18th

=== World Championships ===
Event	Individual	Sprint	Pursuit	Mass start	Relay	Mixed relay	Single mixed relay
(Sweden) 2019 Östersund	32nd	71st	—	—	23rd	—	—
(Italy) 2020 Rasen-Antholz	25th	34th	32nd	—	19th	—	20th
(Slovenia) 2021 Pokljuka	19th	21st	25th	24th	22nd	21st	15th
(Germany) 2023 Oberhof	27th	67th	—	—	19th	14th	17th
(Czech Republic) 2024 Nové Město na Moravě	37th	32nd	29th	—	22nd	8th	16th
(Switzerland) 2025 Lenzerheide	39th	17th	14th	22nd	14th	10th	13th

*During Olympic seasons competitions are only held for those events not included in the Olympic program.

== Results ==
- 2nd at the Junior World Championships in the 10 km sprint event (2012)
- 1st (2009) and 2nd (2010) at the Junior World Championships in the relay event with the French team
- 3rd at the French championships 2016 in the sprint and pursuit events
- 4 titles at the Belgian championships: 3 in biathlon and one in cross-country skiing (2017)
- 9th in the 10 km sprint event at the 2018 European Championships
