= Biathlon World Championships 2021 =

Competition in Pokljuka, Slovenia

- Host city: Pokljuka
- Country: Slovenia
- Opening: 9 February 2021
- Closing: 21 February 2021
- Website: pokljuka2021.si/en

The Biathlon World Championships 2021 took place in Pokljuka, Slovenia, from 9 to 21 February 2021.

== Host selection ==
On 4 September 2016, Tyumen won the voting (25 votes) during the 12th IBU Congress in Chișinău in Moldova over Pokljuka in Slovenia (13 votes) and Nové Město na Moravě in the Czech Republic (11 votes). Also Antholz-Anterselva, Italy, withdrew their bid for 2021 championships before the vote took place due to winning of an election for the host of the 2020 event.

Just before the Biathlon World Championships 2017 in Hochfilzen, Austria, IBU forced Russia to give back rights due to the doping scandal, for revote process after 2018 Winter Olympics in Pyeongchang, South Korea.

On 9 September 2018, during the IBU Congress, Pokljuka was named the 2021 event host city without alternative with 49–1 votes.

== Russia doping ban ==
On 9 December 2019, the World Anti-Doping Agency (WADA) banned Russia from all international sport for a period of four years, after the Russian government was found to have tampered with laboratory data that it provided to WADA in January 2019 as a condition of the Russian Anti-Doping Agency being reinstated. As a result of the ban, WADA plans to allow individually cleared Russian athletes to take part in the 2021–2022 World Championships and 2022 Winter Olympics under a neutral banner, as instigated at the 2018 Winter Olympics, but they will not be permitted to compete in team sports. The title of the neutral banner has yet to be determined; WADA Compliance Review Committee head Jonathan Taylor stated that the IOC would not be able to use "Olympic Athletes from Russia" (OAR) as it did in 2018, emphasizing that neutral athletes cannot be portrayed as representing a specific country. Russia later filed an appeal to the Court of Arbitration for Sport (CAS) against the WADA decision. The Court of Arbitration for Sport, on review of Russia's appeal of its case from WADA, ruled on 17 December 2020 to reduce the penalty that WADA had placed. Instead of banning Russia from sporting events, the ruling allowed Russia to participate at the Olympics and other international events, but for a period of two years, the team cannot use the Russian name, flag, or anthem and must present themselves as "Neutral Athlete" or "Neutral Team". The ruling does allow for team uniforms to display "Russia" on the uniform as well as the use of the Russian flag colors within the uniform's design, although the name should be up to equal predominance as the "Neutral Athlete/Team" designation.

Biathletes of the Russian national team perform at the tournament under the monochrome flag of the Russian Biathlon Union (RBU) as part of the RBU team. However, the IBU banned the use of the decoding of the abbreviation - the Russian Biathlon Union. Also, Russian biathletes are prohibited from using national symbols in social networks during the World Cup.

== Schedule ==
All times are local (UTC+1).

Date	Time	Event
10 February	15:00	4 × 7.5 km M+W mixed relay
12 February	14:30	Men's 10 km sprint
13 February	14:30	Women's 7.5 km sprint
14 February	13:15	Men's 12.5 km pursuit
14 February	15:30	Women's 10 km pursuit
16 February	12:05	Women's 15 km individual
17 February	14:30	Men's 20 km individual
18 February	15:15	6 km M + 7.5 km W single mixed relay
20 February	11:45	Women's 4 × 6 km relay
20 February	15:00	Men's 4 × 7.5 km relay
21 February	12:30	Women's 12.5 km mass start
21 February	15:15	Men's 15 km mass start

== Medal summary ==
=== Medal table ===
* Host nation (Slovenia)

Rank	Nation	Gold	Silver	Bronze	Total
1	Norway	7	3	4	14
2	France	2	2	3	7
3	Sweden	1	3	2	6
4	Austria	1	2	0	3
5	Czech Republic	1	0	0	1
6	Germany	0	2	0	2
7	Belarus	0	0	1	1
7	RBU	0	0	1	1
7	Ukraine	0	0	1	1
Totals (9 entries)		12	12	12	36

=== Top athletes ===
All athletes with two or more medals.

Rank	Nation	Gold	Silver	Bronze	Total
1	Tiril Eckhoff (NOR)	4	1	1	6
2	Sturla Holm Lægreid (NOR)	4	0	0	4
3	Johannes Thingnes Bø (NOR)	2	1	1	4
4	Marte Olsbu Røiseland (NOR)	2	0	0	2
5	Lisa Theresa Hauser (AUT)	1	2	0	3
6	Ingrid Landmark Tandrevold (NOR)	1	1	1	3
6	Martin Ponsiluoma (SWE)	1	1	1	3
8	Émilien Jacquelin (FRA)	1	0	1	2
9	Sebastian Samuelsson (SWE)	0	2	2	4
10	Hanna Öberg (SWE)	0	1	2	3
11	Anaïs Chevalier-Bouchet (FRA)	0	1	1	2
11	Johannes Dale (NOR)	0	1	1	2

=== Men ===
Event	Gold		Silver		Bronze	
10 km sprint	Martin Ponsiluoma; Sweden	24:41.1 (0+0)	Simon Desthieux; France	24:52.3 (0+0)	Émilien Jacquelin; France	24:54.0 (1+0)
12.5 km pursuit	Émilien Jacquelin; France	31:22.1 (0+0+0+0)	Sebastian Samuelsson; Sweden	31:29.4 (0+0+0+0)	Johannes Thingnes Bø; Norway	31:30.2 (0+1+1+0)
20 km individual	Sturla Holm Lægreid; Norway	49:27.6 (0+0+0+0)	Arnd Peiffer; Germany	49:44.5 (0+0+0+0)	Johannes Dale; Norway	50:08.5 (0+1+0+0)
4 × 7.5 km relay	Norway Sturla Holm Lægreid; Tarjei Bø; Johannes Thingnes Bø; Vetle Sjåstad Christiansen	1:12:27.4 (0+1) (0+1) (0+0) (0+3) (0+1) (0+0) (0+0) (0+2)	Sweden Peppe Femling; Jesper Nelin; Martin Ponsiluoma; Sebastian Samuelsson	1:13:00.5 (0+3) (0+0) (0+1) (0+0) (0+2) (0+1) (0+0) (0+0)	RBU Said Karimulla Khalili; Matvey Eliseev; Alexander Loginov; Eduard Latypov	1:13:18.3 (0+2) (0+0) (0+0) (0+1) (0+0) (0+1) (0+0) (0+1)
15 km mass start	Sturla Holm Lægreid; Norway	36:27.2 (0+0+0+1)	Johannes Dale; Norway	36:37.4 (0+1+1+0)	Quentin Fillon Maillet; France	36:40.0 (1+1+0+0)

=== Women ===
Event	Gold		Silver		Bronze	
7.5 km sprint	Tiril Eckhoff; Norway	21:18.7 (0+0)	Anaïs Chevalier-Bouchet; France	21:30.7 (0+1)	Hanna Sola; Belarus	21:33.1 (0+0)
10 km pursuit	Tiril Eckhoff; Norway	30:38.1 (1+0+1+0)	Lisa Theresa Hauser; Austria	30:55.4 (1+0+0+0)	Anaïs Chevalier-Bouchet; France	31:11.1 (0+1+0+1)
15 km individual	Markéta Davidová; Czech Republic	42:27.7 (0+0+0+0)	Hanna Öberg; Sweden	42:55.6 (0+0+1+0)	Ingrid Landmark Tandrevold; Norway	43:31.7 (0+1+0+0)
4 × 6 km relay	Norway Ingrid Landmark Tandrevold; Tiril Eckhoff; Ida Lien; Marte Olsbu Røiseland	1:10:39.0 (0+0) (0+1) (0+2) (0+1) (0+1) (0+2) (0+3) (0+1)	Germany Vanessa Hinz; Janina Hettich; Denise Herrmann; Franziska Preuß	1:10:47.8 (0+0) (0+0) (0+2) (0+0) (0+3) (0+0) (0+0) (0+0)	Ukraine Anastasiya Merkushyna; Yuliia Dzhima; Darya Blashko; Olena Pidhrushna	1:10:48.2 (0+1) (0+0) (0+1) (0+2) (0+1) (0+0) (0+0) (0+2)
12.5 km mass start	Lisa Theresa Hauser; Austria	36:05.7 (0+0+0+0)	Ingrid Landmark Tandrevold; Norway	36:27.4 (0+0+1+0)	Tiril Eckhoff; Norway	36:28.7 (1+0+1+1)

=== Mixed ===
Event	Gold		Silver		Bronze	
4 × 7.5 km M+W relay	Norway Sturla Holm Lægreid; Johannes Thingnes Bø; Tiril Eckhoff; Marte Olsbu Røiseland	1:20:19.3 (0+0) (0+1) (0+1) (0+1) (0+2) (0+2) (0+1) (0+3)	Austria David Komatz; Simon Eder; Dunja Zdouc; Lisa Theresa Hauser	1:20:46.3 (0+1) (0+0) (0+0) (0+0) (0+0) (0+0) (0+0) (0+1)	Sweden Sebastian Samuelsson; Martin Ponsiluoma; Linn Persson; Hanna Öberg	1:20:49.9 (0+0) (0+2) (0+1) (0+2) (0+0) (0+1) (0+2) (0+0)
6 km M + 7.5 km W single relay	France Antonin Guigonnat; Julia Simon	36:42.4 (0+2) (0+1) (0+0) (0+0) (0+0) (0+0) (0+1) (0+1)	Norway Johannes Thingnes Bø; Tiril Eckhoff	36:45.2 (0+1) (0+2) (0+1) (0+1) (0+3) (0+1) (0+0) (0+0)	Sweden Sebastian Samuelsson; Hanna Öberg	37:15.4 (0+2) (0+1) (0+0) (0+1) (0+0) (0+1) (0+2) (0+1)

== Participating countries ==
37 nations competed.

- Australia
- Austria
- Belarus
- Belgium
- Bulgaria
- Canada
- Croatia
- Czech Republic
- Estonia
- Finland
- France
- Germany
- Great Britain
- Greece
- Greenland
- Hungary
- Italy
- Japan
- Kazakhstan
- Latvia
- Lithuania
- Moldova
- New Zealand
- North Macedonia
- Norway
- Poland
- Romania
- RBU
- Serbia
- Slovakia
- Slovenia
- South Korea
- Spain
- Sweden
- Switzerland
- Ukraine
- United States
