= 2020–21 Biathlon World Cup – Overall Women =

In the women's 2020–21 Biathlon World Cup total score, for each participating athlete the points earned in all Individual, Sprint, Pursuit and Mass start competitions held during the season are added up with the two lowest scores subtracted at the end of the season to give that athlete's final score. This includes the results from the Biathlon World Championships 2021 (held between the World Cup stages in Antholz-Anterselva and Nové Město).

== 2019–20 Top 3 standings ==
Medal	Athlete	Points
Gold:	Dorothea Wierer (ITA)	793
Silver:	Tiril Eckhoff (NOR)	786
Bronze:	Denise Herrmann (GER)	745

== Events summary ==
Event	Winner	Second	Third
Kontiolahti 15 km Individual details	Dorothea Wierer; Italy	Denise Herrmann; Germany	Johanna Skottheim; Sweden
Kontiolahti 7.5 km Sprint details	Hanna Öberg; Sweden	Marte Olsbu Røiseland; Norway	Karoline Offigstad Knotten; Norway
Kontiolahti (2) 7.5 km Sprint details	Hanna Öberg; Sweden	Anaïs Chevalier-Bouchet; France	Elvira Öberg; Sweden
Kontiolahti (2) 10 km Pursuit details	Tiril Eckhoff; Norway	Marte Olsbu Røiseland; Norway	Hanna Öberg; Sweden
Hochfilzen 7.5 km Sprint details	Dzinara Alimbekava; Belarus	Tiril Eckhoff; Norway	Franziska Preuß; Germany
Hochfilzen 10 km Pursuit details	Marte Olsbu Røiseland; Norway	Dzinara Alimbekava; Belarus	Julia Simon; France
Hochfilzen (2) 7.5 km Sprint details	Tiril Eckhoff; Norway	Ingrid Landmark Tandrevold; Norway	Marte Olsbu Røiseland; Norway
Hochfilzen (2) 10 km Pursuit details	Tiril Eckhoff; Norway	Hanna Öberg; Sweden	Elvira Öberg; Sweden
Hochfilzen (2) 12.5 km Mass Start details	Marte Olsbu Røiseland; Norway	Tiril Eckhoff; Norway	Dorothea Wierer; Italy
Oberhof 7.5 km Sprint details	Tiril Eckhoff; Norway	Hanna Öberg; Sweden	Lisa Theresa Hauser; Austria
Oberhof 10 km Pursuit details	Tiril Eckhoff; Norway	Marte Olsbu Røiseland; Norway	Lisa Theresa Hauser; Austria
Oberhof (2) 7.5 km Sprint details	Tiril Eckhoff; Norway	Dorothea Wierer; Italy	Lisa Theresa Hauser; Austria
Oberhof (2) 12.5 km Mass Start details	Julia Simon; France	Franziska Preuß; Germany	Hanna Öberg; Sweden
Antholz-Anterselva 15 km Individual details	Lisa Theresa Hauser; Austria	Yuliia Dzhima; Ukraine	Anaïs Chevalier-Bouchet; France
Antholz-Anterselva 12.5 km Mass Start details	Julia Simon; France	Hanna Öberg; Sweden	Lisa Theresa Hauser; Austria
World Championships 7.5 km Sprint details	Tiril Eckhoff; Norway	Anaïs Chevalier-Bouchet; France	Hanna Sola; Belarus
World Championships 10 km Pursuit details	Tiril Eckhoff; Norway	Lisa Theresa Hauser; Austria	Anaïs Chevalier-Bouchet; France
World Championships 15 km Individual details	Markéta Davidová; Czech Republic	Hanna Öberg; Sweden	Ingrid Landmark Tandrevold; Norway
World Championships 12.5 km Mass Start details	Lisa Theresa Hauser; Austria	Ingrid Landmark Tandrevold; Norway	Tiril Eckhoff; Norway
Nové Město 7.5 km Sprint details	Tiril Eckhoff; Norway	Yuliia Dzhima; Ukraine	Lisa Vittozzi; Italy
Nové Město 10 km Pursuit details	Tiril Eckhoff; Norway	Denise Herrmann; Germany	Marte Olsbu Røiseland; Norway
Nové Město (2) 7.5 km Sprint details	Tiril Eckhoff; Norway	Denise Herrmann; Germany	Dorothea Wierer; Italy
Nové Město (2) 10 km Pursuit details	Tiril Eckhoff; Norway	Dzinara Alimbekava; Belarus	Franziska Preuß; Germany
Östersund 7.5 km Sprint details	Tiril Eckhoff; Norway	Dorothea Wierer; Italy	Ingrid Landmark Tandrevold; Norway
Östersund 10 km Pursuit details	Marte Olsbu Røiseland; Norway	Tiril Eckhoff; Norway	Hanna Sola; Belarus
Östersund 12.5 km Mass Start details	Ingrid Landmark Tandrevold; Norway	Dzinara Alimbekava; Belarus	Franziska Preuß; Germany

== Standings ==
Point system
Place	IN	SP	PU	MS
1	60			
2	54			
3	48			
4	43			
5	40			
6	38			
7	36			
8	34			
9	32			
10	31			
11	30			
12	29			
13	28			
14	27			
15	26			
16	25			
17	24			
18	23			
19	22			
20	21			
21	20			
22	19			18
23	18			16
24	17			14
25	16			12
26	15			10
27	14			8
28	13			6
29	12			4
30	11			2
31	10			—
32	9			—
33	8			—
34	7			—
35	6			—
36	5			—
37	4			—
38	3			—
39	2			—
40	1			—

In each event places 1 to 40 (1 to 30 in a Mass start) are awarded points, a victory being worth 60 points. The full point system is shown in the table on the right. In a Mass start event only 30 athletes are allowed to participate and the points awarded for ranks 22 to 30 differ from the system used in other events. Equal placings (ties) give an equal number of points. An athlete's total World Cup Score is the sum of all World Cup points earned in the season, minus the points from 2 events in which the athlete got their worst scores. Ties in this score are broken by comparing the tied athletes' number of victories. If this number is the same for the athletes in question, the number of second places is compared, and so on. If a tie cannot be broken by this procedure, it remains a tie.

22 of 26 competitions scored

#	Name	KON IN	KON SP	KON2 SP	KON2 PU	HOC SP	HOC PU	HOC2 SP	HOC2 PU	HOC2 MS	OBE SP	OBE PS	OBE2 SP	OBE2 MS	ANT IN	ANT MS	POK SP	POK PU	POK IN	POK MS	NOV SP	NOV PU	NOV2 SP	NOV2 PU	OST SP	OST PU	OST MS	Total
1.	Tiril Eckhoff (NOR)	0	0	34	60	54	24	60	60	54	60	60	60	34	~~23~~	34	60	60	~~18~~	48	60	60	60	60	60	54	36	1152
2	Marte Olsbu Røiseland (NOR)	~~17~~	54	43	54	43	60	48	36	60	40	54	34	36	~~10~~	36	38	32	~~21~~	43	36	48	27	43	38	60	~~4~~	963
3	Franziska Preuß (GER)	~~23~~	~~18~~	25	36	48	34	43	38	32	27	23	38	54	~~8~~	43	34	40	36	38	34	40	43	48	~~18~~	38	48	840
4	Hanna Öberg (SWE)	36	60	60	48	12	43	38	54	27	54	34	36	48	~~12~~	54	31	28	54	36	~~5~~	28	17	14	0	0	14	826
5	Dorothea Wierer (ITA)	60	19	~~13~~	21	34	38	31	40	48	~~10~~	36	54	38	43	24	21	43	32	34	40	~~7~~	48	40	54	23	~~10~~	821
6	Lisa Theresa Hauser (AUT)	~~3~~	28	0	26	32	31	26	29	34	48	48	48	29	60	48	32	54	43	60	~~3~~	0	28	36	40	20	18	818
7	Dzinara Alimbekava (BLR)	34	38	36	43	60	54	~~10~~	30	21	~~4~~	25	29	28	34	~~2~~	~~1~~	20	24	10	43	15	38	54	30	14	54	734
8	Ingrid Landmark Tandrevold (NOR)	13	20	30	38	22	22	54	43	29	0	–	DNF	43	~~6~~	6	20	31	48	54	38	29	24	17	48	18	60	707
9	Anaïs Chevalier-Bouchet (FRA)	32	29	54	20	~~7~~	19	29	13	18	31	40	40	~~2~~	48	25	54	48	14	~~8~~	26	31	22	32	43	9	~~6~~	677
10	Denise Herrmann (GER)	54	~~3~~	40	30	~~9~~	16	18	32	40	26	9	26	26	24	10	43	34	26	–	31	54	54	31	~~7~~	13	30	667
11	Markéta Davidová (CZE)	20	4	38	19	40	32	20	21	43	36	29	31	31	0	40	0	9	60	28	29	24	30	38	0	–	27	649
12	Elvira Öberg (SWE)	43	17	48	34	30	36	40	48	38	17	28	30	20	0	14	19	27	6	27	0	–	36	25	0	25	23	631
13	Julia Simon (FRA)	19	0	0	24	38	48	0	27	36	43	26	0	60	0	60	13	19	DNF	25	6	22	21	24	19	43	2	575
14	Linn Persson (SWE)	40	22	~~1~~	17	27	~~2~~	34	34	24	22	31	~~6~~	27	26	21	25	22	20	30	20	43	~~4~~	21	27	17	22	572
15	Justine Braisaz-Bouchet (FRA)	0	30	4	31	0	25	27	26	30	32	30	43	32	0	27	16	11	0	6	32	21	29	30	0	5	24	511
16	Lisa Vittozzi (ITA)	0	16	20	0	36	26	11	28	12	0	–	25	24	28	8	40	0	3	40	48	14	13	0	21	15	21	449
17	Yuliia Dzhima (UKR)	31	0	0	–	19	0	1	18	–	31	27	17	–	54	31	4	16	9	–	54	38	40	26	0	DNS	29	445
18	Anaïs Bescond (FRA)	38	0	26	14	11	21	9	~~4~~	23	29	21	27	18	22	32	7	~~5~~	23	16	15	34	5	23	16	0	12	442
19	Svetlana Mironova (RUS)	–	23	31	27	0	–	2	0	–	26	43	20	30	36	38	0	–	40	22	17	27	0	0	17	7	34	440
20	Uliana Kaisheva (RUS)	26	15	0	0	23	14	0	0	–	19	22	22	22	32	18	5	12	17	–	28	20	0	0	25	34	40	394
21	Karoline Offigstad Knotten (NOR)	21	48	19	10	25	40	24	22	28	7	19	3	14	3	28	0	0	–	–	0	–	19	6	0	28	20	384
22	Janina Hettich (GER)	5	0	2	9	29	17	28	19	31	0	13	28	23	40	20	10	7	–	–	12	DNF	0	1	24	29	32	379
23	Hanna Sola (BLR)	0	–	0	12	0	0	22	25	6	15	1	0	–	9	–	48	15	0	2	30	36	12	19	28	48	38	366
24	Vanessa Hinz (GER)	4	9	8	23	0	–	15	0	–	8	20	10	–	29	23	29	38	8	31	18	30	0	–	14	22	25	364
25	Dunja Zdouc (AUT)	27	7	24	13	4	11	14	10	20	16	15	14	12	31	16	3	30	0	–	0	23	0	28	0	27	16	361
26	Emma Lunder (CAN)	28	2	22	32	5	15	30	31	26	0	18	0	25	DNS	26	0	21	19	24	0	–	0	–	0	0	–	324
27	Lena Häcki (SUI)	1	0	0	22	3	30	0	0	–	5	12	1	–	18	–	36	29	29	26	0	–	0	–	36	30	43	321
28	Mona Brorsson (SWE)	30	40	27	18	13	12	0	–	25	0	–	23	40	0	12	0	0	–	–	0	0	2	0	26	24	28	320
29	Ida Lien (NOR)	11	0	0	–	29	7	0	–	–	14	11	9	–	0	–	24	24	30	14	0	16	26	29	32	DNS	–	276
30	Elena Kruchinkina (BLR)	25	0	12	11	0	0	36	14	2	34	32	19	10	0	–	0	0	15	–	0	–	0	13	12	32	8	275
#	Name	KON IN	KON SP	KON2 SP	KON2 PU	HOC SP	HOC PU	HOC2 SP	HOC2 PU	HOC2 MS	OBE SP	OBE PS	OBE2 SP	OBE2 MS	ANT IN	ANT MS	POK SP	POK PU	POK IN	POK MS	NOV SP	NOV PU	NOV2 SP	NOV2 PU	OST SP	OST PU	OST MS	Total
31	Darya Blashko (UKR)	16	0	23	29	17	23	7	0	16	9	DNS	DNS	–	0	–	27	17	–	4	25	25	15	16	0	4	–	273
32	Julia Schwaiger (AUT)	24	0	29	16	0	–	0	17	–	0	–	32	8	4	–	0	–	31	–	10	10	32	27	0	6	–	246
33	Monika Hojnisz-Staręga (POL)	0	10	6	0	–	–	6	11	–	24	38	–	–	20	–	11	25	25	18	0	–	21	22	–	–	–	237
34	Selina Gasparin (SUI)	DNS	24	0	–	1	4	0	2	–	18	24	0	–	0	–	26	26	38	23	0	19	23	7	0	–	–	235
35	Evgeniya Pavlova (RUS)	8	6	0	28	0	0	23	8	–	38	10	0	–	38	30	0	1	–	–	0	18	0	–	0	0	–	208
36	Clare Egan (USA)	6	14	0	0	31	28	32	23	22	28	3	5	6	0	4	0	0	2	–	0	–	0	0	0	0	–	204
37	Irina Kazakevich (RUS)	0	13	28	25	18	27	0	–	14	0	4	0	–	0	–	22	18	–	21	9	5	0	–	0	–	–	204
38	Larisa Kuklina (RUS)	0	0	–	–	10	18	–	–	–	21	16	0	–	27	29	–	–	27	–	0	0	0	4	12	31	–	195
39	Olena Pidhrushna (UKR)	0	31	16	0	–	–	0	–	–	0	2	0	–	25	–	30	36	0	29	7	0	0	–	6	11	–	193
40	Chloé Chevalier (FRA)	2	34	0	0	0	–	21	24	8	23	6	0	–	0	–	–	–	–	–	0	0	11	10	29	12	–	180
41	Johanna Skottheim (SWE)	48	43	21	40	0	9	0	6	10	0	0	DNS	–	–	–	–	–	0	–	–	–	–	–	–	–	–	177
42	Baiba Bendika (LAT)	–	–	–	–	21	0	0	–	–	20	14	0	–	0	–	15	23	0	32	0	2	25	18	0	–	–	170
43	Maren Hammerschmidt (GER)	29	32	0	7	8	3	13	5	–	0	–	24	4	0	–	–	–	7	–	21	11	0	0	–	–	–	164
44	Susan Dunklee (USA)	0	0	10	15	0	0	0	0	–	0	–	0	–	21	–	23	14	0	12	0	–	34	34	0	–	–	163
45	Iryna Kryuko (BLR)	18	26	0	–	24	29	0	DNF	–	–	–	0	–	0	–	0	–	–	–	0	–	1	20	23	21	–	162
46	Milena Todorova (BUL)	0	0	0	0	0	8	12	0	–	11	17	–	–	–	–	0	0	0	–	0	–	6	0	34	26	26	140
47	Emilie Kalkenberg (NOR)	0	27	11	2	0	0	0	–	–	–	–	–	–	–	–	–	–	–	–	–	–	–	–	20	40	31	131
48	Lucie Charvátová (CZE)	0	0	8	0	17	DNF	0	–	–	0	–	12	–	0	–	0	–	0	–	24	26	31	11	0	–	–	129
49	Irene Cadurisch (SUI)	0	11	0	–	15	6	0	–	–	0	8	0	–	11	–	–	–	34	–	27	9	0	–	0	0	–	121
50	Tuuli Tomingas (EST)	15	36	0	0	0	–	25	7	–	0	–	21	16	0	–	0	0	0	–	0	–	DNS	–	–	–	–	120
51	Elisa Gasparin (SUI)	0	0	5	6	0	–	0	9	–	0	0	16	–	0	–	14	13	22	20	0	0	7	8	0	0	–	120
52	Paulína Fialková (SVK)	–	–	–	–	0	–	0	–	–	0	–	–	–	–	–	28	0	0	–	16	32	0	3	31	8	–	118
53	Aita Gasparin (SUI)	7	21	9	5	0	–	4	0	–	12	0	11	–	0	–	8	6	–	–	13	0	0	0	2	10	–	108
54	Mari Eder (FIN)	9	0	0	–	26	20	0	–	–	0	7	4	–	DNS	–	0	10	0	–	23	4	0	0	0	–	–	103
55	Johanna Talihärm (EST)	10	0	3	0	0	–	0	–	–	0	0	0	–	14	–	9	8	11	–	0	17	0	–	22	3	–	97
56	Caroline Colombo (FRA)	22	0	0	8	6	10	5	1	–	6	0	15	–	19	–	–	–	–	–	–	–	–	–	–	–	–	92
57	Anastasiya Merkushyna (UKR)	–	–	–	–	–	–	0	0	–	0	–	–	–	–	–	–	–	28	–	19	12	14	0	0	–	–	73
58	Ekaterina Avvakumova (KOR)	0	0	0	–	DNF	–	0	–	–	1	0	18	21	17	–	0	–	13	–	0	0	0	–	0	–	–	70
59	Valentyna Semerenko (UKR)	–	0	32	DNF	0	DNS	0	DNS	–	–	–	13	–	13	–	0	DNF	–	–	1	8	0	–	0	0	–	67
60	Eva Puskarčíková (CZE)	0	0	0	–	0	–	19	15	4	2	0	0	–	0	–	0	–	4	–	0	0	8	12	0	–	–	64
#	Name	KON IN	KON SP	KON2 SP	KON2 PU	HOC SP	HOC PU	HOC2 SP	HOC2 PU	HOC2 MS	OBE SP	OBE PS	OBE2 SP	OBE2 MS	ANT IN	ANT MS	POK SP	POK PU	POK IN	POK MS	NOV SP	NOV PU	NOV2 SP	NOV2 PU	OST SP	OST PU	OST MS	Total
61	Ivona Fialková (SVK)	–	–	–	–	0	0	0	0	–	13	0	–	–	–	–	0	–	0	–	0	1	0	–	8	36	–	58
62	Marion Deigentesch (GER)	–	–	–	–	–	–	–	–	–	–	–	–	–	30	22	–	–	–	–	–	–	–	–	0	–	–	52
63	Anna Magnusson (SWE)	0	25	18	0	0	–	0	0	–	0	–	0	–	–	–	–	–	–	–	0	–	0	9	0	0	–	52
64	Fuyuko Tachizaki (JPN)	0	12	0	4	20	13	0	0	–	0	–	0	–	0	–	0	0	0	–	0	–	0	0	0	–	–	49
65	Kamila Żuk (POL)	0	5	17	1	0	0	0	–	–	0	0	2	–	–	–	12	0	0	–	8	3	0	0	–	–	–	48
66	Tatiana Akimova (RUS)	–	–	–	–	–	–	8	12	–	–	–	–	–	0	–	–	–	12	–	0	–	16	0	0	0	–	48
67	Galina Vishnevskaya-Sheporenko (KAZ)	–	–	–	–	–	–	–	–	–	–	–	–	–	–	–	0	–	16	–	0	–	18	0	13	0	–	47
68	Jessica Jislová (CZE)	0	0	0	3	0	–	17	0	–	0	–	0	–	1	–	0	–	0	–	14	0	10	0	0	–	–	45
69	Alina Stremous (MDA)	–	–	0	–	–	–	–	–	–	–	–	–	–	–	–	0	0	0	–	22	13	0	–	0	–	–	35
70	Anna Weidel (GER)	0	–	–	–	–	–	0	20	–	0	5	0	–	–	–	–	–	–	–	–	–	0	0	10	0	–	35
71	Stina Nilsson (SWE)	–	–	–	–	–	–	–	–	–	–	–	–	–	–	–	–	–	–	–	–	–	–	–	15	19	–	34
72	Lou Jeanmonnot (FRA)	–	–	–	–	–	–	–	–	–	–	–	–	–	–	–	–	–	–	–	11	6	0	15	0	0	–	32
73	Joanne Reid (USA)	12	0	0	–	14	5	0	–	–	0	0	0	–	0	–	0	0	1	–	0	–	0	–	–	–	–	32
74	Michela Carrara (ITA)	–	–	–	–	0	–	–	–	–	–	–	–	–	0	–	18	3	10	–	0	0	0	–	0	–	–	31
75	Tamara Voronina (RUS)	14	0	14	LAP	0	–	–	–	–	–	–	–	–	–	–	–	–	–	–	–	–	–	–	–	–	–	28
76	Suvi Minkkinen (FIN)	0	0	0	–	0	0	0	16	–	0	–	0	–	0	–	0	–	0	–	0	0	0	2	5	1	–	24
77	Katharina Innerhofer (AUT)	0	0	15	0	0	1	0	0	–	0	–	0	–	2	–	2	4	0	–	0	–	0	–	0	–	–	24
78	Megan Bankes (CAN)	0	0	0	–	0	0	–	–	–	0	–	0	–	16	–	6	0	0	–	0	–	0	–	–	–	–	22
79	Anastasiia Goreeva (RUS)	0	–	0	–	–	–	17	0	–	–	–	–	–	–	–	–	–	–	–	–	–	–	–	3	0	–	20
80	Irene Lardschneider (ITA)	0	0	0	0	0	–	0	0	–	0	0	0	–	–	–	17	0	0	–	0	–	0	–	–	–	–	17
81	Vanessa Voigt (GER)	–	–	–	–	–	–	–	–	–	–	–	–	–	–	–	–	–	–	–	0	–	–	–	0	16	–	16
82	Anna Mąka (POL)	–	–	–	–	–	–	–	–	–	–	–	–	–	15	–	–	–	0	–	0	–	0	–	–	–	–	15
83	Lotte Lie (BEL)	0	0	0	–	0	0	0	–	–	0	–	0	–	0	–	0	0	5	–	0	0	0	5	4	0	–	14
84	Polona Klemenčič (SLO)	0	0	0	–	0	–	3	0	–	0	–	0	–	–	–	0	–	0	–	0	0	9	0	0	–	–	12
85	Sarah Beaudry (CAN)	0	0	0	–	2	0	0	3	–	0	LAP	0	–	7	–	0	–	0	–	0	–	0	–	–	–	–	12
86	Sanita Buliņa (LAT)	–	–	–	–	0	–	0	–	–	0	–	0	–	0	–	0	–	0	–	0	–	0	–	9	0	–	9
87	Federica Sanfilippo (ITA)	0	0	0	0	0	–	–	–	–	–	–	8	–	0	–	0	–	0	–	0	–	0	–	–	–	–	8
88	Christina Rieder (AUT)	0	8	0	DNS	0	–	–	–	–	0	–	0	–	0	–	–	–	–	–	–	–	–	–	–	–	–	8
89	Kinga Zbylut (POL)	0	1	0	–	0	0	0	0	–	0	0	7	–	–	–	0	–	DNF	–	0	DNS	0	–	–	–	–	8
90	Alla Ghilenko (MDA)	–	–	–	–	0	–	0	–	–	0	DNS	0	–	–	–	0	0	DNF	–	4	0	3	0	1	0	–	8
#	Name	KON IN	KON SP	KON2 SP	KON2 PU	HOC SP	HOC PU	HOC2 SP	HOC2 PU	HOC2 MS	OBE SP	OBE PS	OBE2 SP	OBE2 MS	ANT IN	ANT MS	POK SP	POK PU	POK IN	POK MS	NOV SP	NOV PU	NOV2 SP	NOV2 PU	OST SP	OST PU	OST MS	Total
91	Yelizaveta Belchenko (KAZ)	0	0	0	–	0	–	0	–	–	0	0	0	–	5	–	0	2	0	–	0	–	0	–	0	–	–	7
92	Anna Frolina (KOR)	–	0	0	0	0	0	0	–	–	3	0	0	–	0	–	0	–	0	–	0	–	0	–	–	–	–	3
93	Sari Maeda (JPN)	0	0	0	0	0	0	0	–	–	0	–	0	–	0	–	0	–	0	–	2	0	0	–	0	–	–	2
94	Karoline Erdal (NOR)	–	–	–	–	–	–	–	–	–	0	–	–	–	–	–	–	–	–	–	–	–	–	–	0	2	–	2
