= 2020–21 Biathlon World Cup – Sprint Women =

The 2020–21 Biathlon World Cup – Sprint Women started on 29 November 2020 in Kontiolahti and will finished on 18 March 2021 in Östersund

== Competition format ==
The 7.5 kilometres (4.7 mi) sprint race is the third oldest biathlon event; the distance is skied over three laps. The biathlete shoots two times at any shooting lane, first prone, then standing, totalling 10 targets. For each missed target the biathlete has to complete a penalty lap of around 150 metres (490 ft). Competitors' starts are staggered, normally by 30 seconds.

== 2019–20 Top 3 standings ==
Medal	Athlete	Points
Gold:	Denise Herrmann (GER)	314
Silver:	Dorothea Wierer (ITA)	305
Bronze:	Tiril Eckhoff (NOR)	283

== Medal winners ==
Event	Gold	Time	Silver	Time	Bronze	Time
Kontiolahti details	Hanna Öberg; Sweden	21:01.4 (0+0)	Marte Olsbu Røiseland; Norway	21:25.3 (0+0)	Karoline Offigstad Knotten; Norway	21:39.2 (0+0)
Kontiolahti (2) details	Hanna Öberg; Sweden	21:11.5 (0+0)	Anaïs Chevalier-Bouchet; France	21:21.1 (0+0)	Elvira Öberg; Sweden	21:39.4 (0+1)
Hochfilzen details	Dzinara Alimbekava; Belarus	20:12.3 (0+0)	Tiril Eckhoff; Norway	20:20.8 (1+0)	Franziska Preuß; Germany	20:22.2 (0+1)
Hochfilzen (2) details	Tiril Eckhoff; Norway	19:38.0 (1+0)	Ingrid Landmark Tandrevold; Norway	19:45.6 (0+0)	Marte Olsbu Røiseland; Norway	20:02.6 (1+0)
Oberhof details	Tiril Eckhoff; Norway	23:54.0 (0+0)	Hanna Öberg; Sweden	24:23.6 (0+0)	Lisa Theresa Hauser; Austria	24:34.2 (0+1)
Oberhof (2) details	Tiril Eckhoff; Norway	22:33.8 (0+1)	Dorothea Wierer; Italy	22:43.1 (0+0)	Lisa Theresa Hauser; Austria	22:46.4 (0+0)
World Championships details	Tiril Eckhoff; Norway	21:18.7 (0+0)	Anaïs Chevalier-Bouchet; France	21:30.7 (0+1)	Hanna Sola; Belarus	21:33.1 (0+0)
Nové Město details	Tiril Eckhoff; Norway	18:48.4 (1+0)	Yuliia Dzhima; Ukraine	18:57.7 (0+0)	Lisa Vittozzi; Italy	19:03.4 (0+0)
Nové Město (2) details	Tiril Eckhoff; Norway	18:11.1 (0+1)	Denise Herrmann; Germany	18:17.2 (0+0)	Dorothea Wierer; Italy	18:21.6 (0+0)
Östersund details	Tiril Eckhoff; Norway	18:44.6 (0+1)	Dorothea Wierer; Italy	18:47.1 (0+0)	Ingrid Landmark Tandrevold; Norway	18:51.3 (0+0)

== Standings ==
7 of 10 competitions scored

#	Name	KON	KON 2	HOC	HOC 2	OBH	OBH 2	WCH	NME	NME 2	OST	Total
1	Tiril Eckhoff (NOR)	0	~~34~~	~~54~~	60	60	60	60	60	60	60	420
2	Marte Olsbu Røiseland (NOR)	54	43	43	48	40	~~34~~	38	~~36~~	~~27~~	38	304
3	Hanna Öberg (SWE)	60	60	~~12~~	38	54	36	31	~~5~~	17	0	296
4	Dorothea Wierer (ITA)	~~19~~	~~13~~	34	31	~~10~~	54	21	40	48	54	282
5	Anaïs Chevalier-Bouchet (FRA)	29	54	~~7~~	29	31	40	54	~~26~~	~~22~~	43	280
6	Dzinara Alimbekava (BLR)	38	36	60	~~10~~	~~4~~	29	~~1~~	43	38	30	274
7	Franziska Preuß (GER)	~~18~~	~~25~~	48	43	27	38	34	34	43	~~18~~	267
8	Lisa Theresa Hauser (AUT)	28	0	32	~~26~~	48	48	32	~~3~~	28	40	256
9	Denise Herrmann (GER)	~~3~~	40	~~9~~	18	26	26	43	31	54	~~7~~	238
10	Ingrid Landmark Tandrevold (NOR)	~~20~~	30	22	54	0	DNF	20	38	24	48	236
11	Markéta Davidová (CZE)	~~4~~	38	40	20	36	31	0	29	30	0	224
12	Elvira Öberg (SWE)	~~17~~	48	30	40	17	30	19	0	36	0	220
13	Justine Braisaz-Bouchet (FRA)	30	~~4~~	0	27	32	43	16	32	29	0	209
14	Lisa Vittozzi (ITA)	16	20	36	~~11~~	0	25	40	48	~~13~~	21	206
15	Linn Persson (SWE)	22	~~1~~	27	34	22	~~6~~	25	20	~~4~~	27	177
16	Yuliia Dzhima (UKR)	0	0	19	1	31	17	4	54	40	0	166
17	Hanna Sola (BLR)	–	0	0	22	15	0	48	30	12	28	155
18	Karoline Offigstad Knotten (NOR)	48	19	25	24	7	3	0	0	19	0	145
19	Julia Simon (FRA)	0	0	38	0	43	0	13	6	21	19	140
20	Uliana Kaisheva (RUS)	15	0	23	0	19	22	5	28	0	25	137
21	Svetlana Mironova (RUS)	23	31	0	2	26	20	0	17	0	17	136
22	Ida Lien (NOR)	0	0	29	0	14	9	24	0	26	32	134
23	Janina Hettich (GER)	0	2	29	28	0	28	10	12	0	24	133
24	Anaïs Bescond (FRA)	0	26	11	9	29	27	~~7~~	15	~~5~~	16	133
25	Mona Brorsson (SWE)	40	27	13	0	0	23	0	0	2	26	131
26	Darya Blashko (UKR)	0	23	17	7	9	DNS	27	25	15	0	123
27	Chloé Chevalier (FRA)	34	0	0	21	23	0	–	0	11	29	118
28	Elena Kruchinkina (BLR)	0	12	0	36	34	19	0	0	0	12	113
29	Clare Egan (USA)	14	0	31	32	28	5	0	0	0	0	110
30	Julia Schwaiger (AUT)	0	29	0	0	0	32	0	10	32	0	103
#	Name	KON	KON 2	HOC	HOC 2	OBH	OBH 2	POK	NME	NME 2	OST	Total
31	Vanessa Hinz (GER)	9	~~8~~	0	15	8	10	29	18	0	14	103
32	Maren Hammerschmidt (GER)	32	0	8	13	0	24	–	21	0	–	98
33	Lucie Charvátová (CZE)	0	8	17	0	0	12	0	24	31	0	92
34	Selina Gasparin (SUI)	24	0	1	0	18	0	26	0	23	0	92
35	Olena Pidhrushna (UKR)	31	16	–	0	0	0	30	7	0	6	90
36	Irina Kazakevich (RUS)	13	28	18	0	0	0	22	9	0	0	90
37	Tuuli Tomingas (EST)	36	0	0	25	0	21	0	0	DNS	–	82
38	Dunja Zdouc (AUT)	7	24	4	14	16	14	3	0	0	0	82
39	Lena Häcki (SUI)	0	0	3	0	5	1	36	0	0	36	81
40	Baiba Bendika (LAT)	–	–	21	0	20	0	15	0	25	0	81
41	Monika Hojnisz-Staręga (POL)	10	6	–	6	24	–	11	0	21	–	78
42	Aita Gasparin (SUI)	21	9	0	4	12	11	8	13	0	~~2~~	78
43	Paulína Fialková (SVK)	–	–	0	0	0	–	28	16	0	31	75
44	Iryna Kryuko (BLR)	26	0	24	0	–	0	0	0	1	23	74
45	Evgeniya Pavlova (RUS)	6	0	0	23	38	0	0	0	0	0	67
46	Susan Dunklee (USA)	0	10	0	0	0	0	23	0	34	0	67
47	Johanna Skottheim (SWE)	43	21	0	0	0	DNS	–	–	–	–	64
48	Milena Todorova (BUL)	0	0	0	12	11	–	0	0	6	34	63
49	Emma Lunder (CAN)	2	22	5	30	0	0	0	0	0	0	59
50	Emilie Kalkenberg (NOR)	27	11	0	0	–	–	–	–	–	20	58
51	Irene Cadurisch (SUI)	11	0	15	0	0	0	–	27	0	0	53
52	Mari Eder (FIN)	0	0	26	0	0	4	0	23	0	0	53
53	Valentyna Semerenko (UKR)	0	32	0	0	–	13	0	1	0	0	46
54	Kamila Żuk (POL)	5	17	0	0	0	2	12	8	0	–	44
55	Anna Magnusson (SWE)	25	18	0	0	0	0	–	0	0	0	43
56	Larisa Kuklina (RUS)	0	–	10	–	21	0	–	0	0	12	43
57	Elisa Gasparin (SUI)	0	5	0	0	0	16	14	0	7	0	42
58	Jessica Jislová (CZE)	0	0	0	17	0	0	0	14	10	0	41
59	Johanna Talihärm (EST)	0	3	0	0	0	0	9	0	0	22	34
60	Anastasiya Merkushyna (UKR)	–	–	–	0	0	–	–	19	14	0	33
#	Name	KON	KON 2	HOC	HOC 2	OBH	OBH 2	POK	NME	NME 2	OST	Total
61	Fuyuko Tachizaki (JPN)	12	0	20	0	0	0	0	0	0	0	32
62	Caroline Colombo (FRA)	0	0	6	5	6	15	–	–	–	–	32
63	Galina Vishnevskaya-Sheporenko (KAZ)	–	–	–	–	–	–	0	0	18	13	31
64	Eva Puskarčíková (CZE)	0	0	0	19	2	0	0	0	8	0	29
65	Tatiana Akimova (RUS)	–	–	–	8	–	–	–	0	16	0	24
66	Alina Stremous (MDA)	–	0	–	–	–	–	0	22	0	0	22
67	Ivona Fialková (SVK)	–	–	0	0	13	–	0	0	0	8	21
68	Anastasiia Goreeva (RUS)	–	0	–	17	–	–	–	–	–	3	20
69	Ekaterina Avvakumova (KOR)	0	0	DNF	0	1	18	0	0	0	0	19
70	Michela Carrara (ITA)	–	–	0	–	–	–	18	0	0	0	18
71	Irene Lardschneider (ITA)	0	0	0	0	0	0	17	0	0	–	17
72	Katharina Innerhofer (AUT)	0	15	0	0	0	0	2	0	0	0	17
73	Stina Nilsson (SWE)	–	–	–	–	–	–	–	–	–	15	15
74	Joanne Reid (USA)	0	0	14	0	0	0	0	0	0	–	14
75	Tamara Voronina (RUS)	0	14	0	–	–	–	–	–	–	–	14
76	Polona Klemenčič (SLO)	0	0	0	3	0	0	0	0	9	0	12
77	Lou Jeanmonnot (FRA)	–	–	–	–	–	–	–	11	0	0	11
78	Anna Weidel (GER)	–	–	–	0	0	0	–	–	0	10	10
79	Sanita Buliņa (LAT)	–	–	0	0	0	0	0	0	0	9	9
80	Federica Sanfilippo (ITA)	0	0	0	–	–	8	0	0	0	–	8
81	Christina Rieder (AUT)	8	0	0	–	0	0	–	–	–	–	8
82	Kinga Zbylut (POL)	1	0	0	0	0	7	0	0	0	–	8
83	Alla Ghilenko (MDA)	–	–	0	0	0	0	0	4	3	1	8
84	Megan Bankes (CAN)	0	0	0	–	0	0	6	0	0	–	6
85	Suvi Minkkinen (FIN)	0	0	0	0	0	0	0	0	0	5	5
86	Lotte Lie (BEL)	0	0	0	0	0	0	0	0	0	4	4
87	Anna Frolina (KOR)	0	0	0	0	3	0	0	0	0	–	3
88	Sarah Beaudry (CAN)	0	0	2	0	0	0	0	0	0	–	2
89	Sari Maeda (JPN)	0	0	0	0	0	0	0	2	0	0	2
