= Biathlon World Championships 2021 – Women's individual =

Women's individual at the Biathlon World Championships 2021
- Location: Pokljuka, Slovenia
- Date: 16 February
- Competitors: 97 from 30 nations
- Winning time: 42:27.7

Medalists
gold medal	Markéta Davidová	Czech Republic
silver medal	Hanna Öberg	Sweden
bronze medal	Ingrid Landmark Tandrevold	Norway

The Women's individual competition at the Biathlon World Championships 2021 was held on 16 February 2021.

== Results ==
The race was started at 12:05.

Rank	Bib	Name	Nationality	Penalties (P+S+P+S)	Time	Deficit
1st place, gold medalist(s)	39	Markéta Davidová	Czech Republic	0 (0+0+0+0)	42:27.7	
2nd place, silver medalist(s)	22	Hanna Öberg	Sweden	1 (0+0+1+0)	42:55.6	+27.9
3rd place, bronze medalist(s)	56	Ingrid Landmark Tandrevold	Norway	1 (0+1+0+0)	43:31.7	+1:04.0
4	25	Lisa Theresa Hauser	Austria	2 (0+0+0+2)	44:19.9	+1:52.2
5	93	Svetlana Mironova	RBU	2 (0+0+1+1)	44:33.5	+2:05.8
6	67	Selina Gasparin	Switzerland	2 (1+0+0+1)	44:37.3	+2:09.6
7	12	Franziska Preuß	Germany	2 (0+1+0+1)	44:42.1	+2:14.4
8	97	Irene Cadurisch	Switzerland	1 (0+0+0+1)	44:42.9	+2:15.2
9	10	Dorothea Wierer	Italy	2 (0+0+1+1)	44:47.9	+2:20.2
10	47	Julia Schwaiger	Austria	1 (0+1+0+0)	44:48.5	+2:20.8
11	21	Ida Lien	Norway	2 (0+0+0+2)	44:52.0	+2:24.3
12	8	Lena Häcki	Switzerland	2 (1+1+0+0)	44:52.3	+2:24.6
13	90	Anastasiya Merkushyna	Ukraine	1 (1+0+0+0)	44:55.7	+2:28.0
14	73	Larisa Kuklina	RBU	1 (1+0+0+0)	44:56.0	+2:28.3
15	33	Denise Herrmann	Germany	2 (1+1+0+0)	44:57.4	+2:29.7
16	11	Monika Hojnisz-Staręga	Poland	2 (1+0+0+1)	45:00.6	+2:32.9
17	14	Dzinara Alimbekava	Belarus	2 (0+0+1+1)	45:05.4	+2:37.7
18	59	Anaïs Bescond	France	2 (0+1+0+1)	45:16.6	+2:48.9
19	75	Elisa Gasparin	Switzerland	1 (0+0+0+1)	45:27.5	+2:59.8
20	36	Marte Olsbu Røiseland	Norway	3 (0+0+1+2)	45:29.1	+3:01.4
21	7	Linn Persson	Sweden	2 (0+2+0+0)	45:34.2	+3:06.5
22	30	Emma Lunder	Canada	2 (1+0+0+1)	45:45.1	+3:17.4
23	45	Tiril Eckhoff	Norway	4 (1+1+2+0)	45:46.5	+3:18.8
24	20	Uliana Kaisheva	RBU	2 (1+0+0+1)	45:49.5	+3:21.8
25	49	Galina Vishnevskaya-Sheporenko	Kazakhstan	0 (0+0+0+0)	46:00.8	+3:33.1
26	41	Elena Kruchinkina	Belarus	3 (0+1+0+2)	46:01.1	+3:33.4
27	5	Anaïs Chevalier-Bouchet	France	2 (1+0+1+0)	46:01.2	+3:33.5
28	23	Ekaterina Avvakumova	South Korea	1 (0+1+0+0)	46:04.8	+3:37.1
29	48	Tatiana Akimova	RBU	2 (1+1+0+0)	46:06.6	+3:38.9
30	6	Johanna Talihärm	Estonia	2 (1+1+0+0)	46:09.4	+3:41.7
31	46	Michela Carrara	Italy	2 (1+1+0+0)	46:13.4	+3:45.7
32	64	Yuliia Dzhima	Ukraine	4 (0+3+0+1)	46:34.1	+4:06.4
33	29	Vanessa Hinz	Germany	3 (0+1+1+1)	46:44.6	+4:16.9
34	34	Maren Hammerschmidt	Germany	2 (1+0+0+1)	46:48.4	+4:20.7
35	27	Elvira Öberg	Sweden	4 (2+1+1+0)	46:49.4	+4:21.7
36	58	Lotte Lie	Belgium	1 (1+0+0+0)	46:51.0	+4:23.3
37	40	Eva Puskarčíková	Czech Republic	1 (1+0+0+0)	46:52.5	+4:24.8
38	1	Lisa Vittozzi	Italy	4 (2+1+1+0)	46:55.7	+4:28.0
39	32	Clare Egan	United States	3 (0+0+0+3)	46:55.8	+4:28.1
40	68	Joanne Reid	United States	4 (1+3+0+0)	46:59.8	+4:32.1
41	71	Vita Semerenko	Ukraine	2 (0+1+0+1)	47:06.8	+4:39.1
42	3	Dunja Zdouc	Austria	3 (0+1+1+1)	47:07.8	+4:40.1
43	2	Olena Pidhrushna	Ukraine	4 (1+2+0+1)	47:22.7	+4:55.0
44	19	Mari Eder	Finland	4 (0+3+0+1)	47:25.2	+4:57.5
45	31	Yelizaveta Belchenko	Kazakhstan	2 (1+0+1+0)	47:31.5	+5:03.8
46	82	Katharina Innerhofer	Austria	5 (0+2+0+3)	47:32.2	+5:04.5
47	57	Sari Maeda	Japan	3 (0+1+1+1)	47:36.4	+5:08.7
48	13	Lucie Charvátová	Czech Republic	5 (0+2+1+2)	47:36.6	+5:08.9
49	50	Johanna Skottheim	Sweden	2 (0+0+0+2)	47:39.0	+5:11.3
50	9	Paulína Fialková	Slovakia	5 (2+3+0+0)	47:40.1	+5:12.4
51	95	Sarah Beaudry	Canada	2 (0+0+0+2)	47:53.9	+5:26.2
52	17	Baiba Bendika	Latvia	5 (2+1+1+1)	47:55.3	+5:27.6
53	37	Daniela Kadeva	Bulgaria	2 (1+1+0+0)	48:09.2	+5:41.5
54	15	Milena Todorova	Bulgaria	6 (1+3+1+1)	48:16.1	+5:48.4
55	92	Živa Klemenčič	Slovenia	3 (0+2+0+1)	48:21.7	+5:54.0
56	85	Irina Kruchinkina	Belarus	4 (0+2+1+1)	48:27.6	+5:59.9
57	51	Suvi Minkkinen	Finland	3 (0+1+0+2)	48:30.4	+6:02.7
58	44	Gabrielė Leščinskaitė	Lithuania	2 (1+1+0+0)	48:32.0	+6:04.3
59	43	Kamila Żuk	Poland	5 (1+1+1+2)	48:32.5	+6:04.8
60	35	Elena Chirkova	Romania	2 (1+0+1+0)	48:40.6	+6:12.9
61	24	Fuyuko Tachizaki	Japan	4 (1+0+2+1)	48:40.9	+6:13.2
62	72	Regina Oja	Estonia	3 (0+1+2+0)	48:44.5	+6:16.8
63	16	Justine Braisaz	France	6 (2+1+0+3)	48:47.0	+6:19.3
64	87	Jessica Jislová	Czech Republic	3 (1+0+0+2)	49:03.5	+6:35.8
65	52	Ukaleq Slettemark	Greenland	3 (0+1+0+2)	49:10.9	+6:43.2
66	65	Anna Frolina	South Korea	5 (2+0+3+0)	49:18.2	+6:50.5
67	66	Sanita Buliņa	Latvia	3 (0+1+1+1)	49:21.4	+6:53.7
68	84	Anna Mąka	Poland	5 (1+1+1+2)	49:23.2	+6:55.5
69	28	Natalija Kočergina	Lithuania	4 (1+3+0+0)	49:24.5	+6:56.8
70	4	Hanna Sola	Belarus	7 (1+3+1+2)	49:25.4	+6:57.7
71	83	Nadia Moser	Canada	4 (1+1+1+1)	49:26.3	+6:58.6
72	26	Alina Stremous	Moldova	5 (2+1+2+0)	49:28.3	+7:00.6
73	94	Chloe Levins	United States	2 (0+1+1+0)	49:43.9	+7:16.2
74	89	Yurie Tanaka	Japan	4 (0+1+1+2)	49:45.6	+7:17.9
75	53	Tuuli Tomingas	Estonia	4 (1+0+1+2)	49:47.1	+7:19.4
76	86	Lyudmila Akhatova	Kazakhstan	3 (1+1+1+0)	50:19.9	+7:52.2
77	62	Susan Dunklee	United States	5 (0+1+0+4)	50:27.2	+7:59.5
78	77	Maria Zdravkova	Bulgaria	2 (0+0+0+2)	50:46.3	+8:18.6
79	55	Ivona Fialková	Slovakia	7 (2+3+1+1)	50:50.3	+8:22.6
80	69	Rieke De Maeyer	Belgium	3 (1+2+0+0)	51:14.6	+8:46.9
81	98	Erika Jänkä	Finland	3 (0+3+0+0)	51:16.1	+8:48.4
82	76	Lea Einfalt	Slovenia	5 (2+1+1+1)	51:34.4	+9:06.7
83	91	Federica Sanfilippo	Italy	8 (2+1+3+2)	52:31.1	+10:03.4
84	63	Polona Klemenčič	Slovenia	7 (0+2+2+3)	52:42.5	+10:14.8
85	79	Irene Lardschneider	Italy	6 (2+2+0+2)	53:10.0	+10:42.3
86	78	Annija Keita Sabule	Latvia	3 (0+2+1+0)	53:32.1	+11:04.4
87	88	Anika Kožica	Croatia	5 (1+2+1+1)	53:45.3	+11:17.6
88	60	Megan Bankes	Canada	8 (1+3+1+3)	53:48.8	+11:21.1
89	74	Veronika Machyniaková	Slovakia	5 (1+1+1+2)	54:07.2	+11:39.5
90	38	Jillian Colebourn	Australia	6 (1+2+1+2)	54:21.1	+11:53.4
91	70	Ana Cotrus	Romania	9 (2+2+3+2)	55:38.7	+13:11.0
92	81	Mun Ji-hee	South Korea	8 (1+1+3+3)	56:01.6	+13:33.9
93	42	Nika Blaženić	Croatia	8 (1+1+3+3)	56:52.5	+14:24.8
	18	Julia Simon	France	7 (2+1+3+1)	Did not finish	
	61	Alla Ghilenko	Moldova	(1+2+0)	Did not finish	
	80	Venla Lehtonen	Finland	(1+2)	Did not finish	
	96	Kinga Zbylut	Poland	(2+2+2)	Did not finish	
	54	Amanda Lightfoot	Great Britain	Did not start		
