= Biathlon World Championships 2020 – Mixed relay =

Mixed relay at the Biathlon World Championships 2020
- Venue: South Tyrol Arena
- Location: Antholz-Anterselva, Italy
- Dates: 13 February
- Competitors: 108 from 27 nations
- Teams: 27
- Winning time: 1:02:27.7

Medalists
gold medal	Marte Olsbu Røiseland; Tiril Eckhoff; Tarjei Bø; Johannes Thingnes Bø	Norway
silver medal	Lisa Vittozzi; Dorothea Wierer; Lukas Hofer; Dominik Windisch	Italy
bronze medal	Eva Puskarčíková; Markéta Davidová; Ondřej Moravec; Michal Krčmář	Czech Republic

The mixed relay competition at the Biathlon World Championships 2020 was held on 13 February 2020.

== Results ==
The race was started at 14:45.

Rank	Bib	Team	Time	Penalties (P+S)	Deficit
1st place, gold medalist(s)	1	Norway; Marte Olsbu Røiseland; Tiril Eckhoff; Tarjei Bø; Johannes Thingnes Bø	1:02:27.7; 16:30.7; 16:29.5; 14:46.1; 14:41.4	0+2 0+5; 0+0 0+1; 0+2 0+0; 0+0 0+2; 0+0 0+2	
2nd place, silver medalist(s)	3	Italy; Lisa Vittozzi; Dorothea Wierer; Lukas Hofer; Dominik Windisch	1:02:43.3; 16:31.9; 16:40.6; 14:34.1; 14:56.7	0+3 0+3; 0+2 0+0; 0+1 0+1; 0+0 0+0; 0+0 0+2	+15.6
3rd place, bronze medalist(s)	9	Czech Republic; Eva Puskarčíková; Markéta Davidová; Ondřej Moravec; Michal Krčmář	1:02:58.5; 16:44.4; 16:27.4; 14:39.6; 15:07.1	0+1 0+1; 0+1 0+0; 0+0 0+0; 0+0 0+0; 0+0 0+1	+30.8
4	6	Germany; Franziska Preuß; Denise Herrmann; Arnd Peiffer; Benedikt Doll	1:03:16.9; 17:05.6; 16:36.0; 14:47.4; 14:47.9	0+1 1+10; 0+1 0+2; 0+0 1+3; 0+0 0+3; 0+0 0+2	+49.2
5	24	Ukraine; Anastasiya Merkushyna; Yuliia Dzhima; Artem Pryma; Dmytro Pidruchnyi	1:03:23.8; 16:46.6; 16:52.9; 14:40.7; 15:03.6	0+0 1+7; 0+0 0+0; 0+0 0+2; 0+0 0+2; 0+0 1+3	+56.1
6	5	Russia; Irina Starykh; Ekaterina Yurlova-Percht; Matvey Eliseev; Alexander Loginov	1:03:27.1; 17:23.2; 16:36.2; 15:01.0; 14:26.7	0+4 0+4; 0+0 0+3; 0+1 0+0; 0+3 0+1; 0+0 0+0	+59.4
7	2	France; Julia Simon; Justine Braisaz; Martin Fourcade; Quentin Fillon Maillet	1:03:36.3; 17:44.9; 16:55.8; 14:36.1; 14:19.5	1+6 0+3; 1+3 0+2; 0+3 0+0; 0+0 0+1; 0+0 0+0	+1:08.6
8	7	Austria; Lisa Hauser; Katharina Innerhofer; Felix Leitner; Dominik Landertinger	1:04:06.9; 16:45.2; 17:30.0; 14:57.2; 14:54.5	0+1 1+6; 0+0 0+1; 0+0 1+3; 0+0 0+2; 0+1 0+0	+1:39.2
9	12	Finland; Mari Eder; Kaisa Mäkäräinen; Tero Seppälä; Olli Hiidensalo	1:04:07.2; 17:11.9; 16:52.2; 14:55.6; 15:07.5	0+6 0+4; 0+3 0+1; 0+1 0+2; 0+1 0+1; 0+1 0+0	+1:39.5
10	8	Switzerland; Selina Gasparin; Lena Häcki; Benjamin Weger; Serafin Wiestner	1:04:18.2; 16:43.1; 16:50.3; 14:46.3; 15:58.5	0+6 2+8; 0+1 0+1; 0+2 0+3; 0+1 0+1; 0+2 2+3	+1:50.5
11	4	Sweden; Linn Persson; Hanna Öberg; Jesper Nelin; Sebastian Samuelsson	1:04:32.7; 17:35.7; 16:21.2; 15:19.6; 15:16.2	0+4 2+9; 0+2 0+3; 0+0 0+0; 0+2 1+3; 0+0 1+3	+2:05.0
12	11	Belarus; Iryna Kryuko; Elena Kruchinkina; Sergey Bocharnikov; Anton Smolski	1:04:51.8; 16:43.8; 16:56.5; 15:08.5; 16:03.0	1+4 0+2; 0+0 0+0; 0+0 0+1; 0+1 0+0; 1+3 0+1	+2:24.1
13	10	United States; Susan Dunklee; Clare Egan; Leif Nordgren; Sean Doherty	1:05:13.8; 17:01.9; 17:15.0; 15:40.0; 15:16.9	0+4 0+5; 0+0 0+0; 0+1 0+2; 0+2 0+1; 0+1 0+2	+2:46.1
14	14	Canada; Emily Dickson; Emma Lunder; Scott Gow; Christian Gow	1:05:25.2; 18:06.9; 16:50.3; 14:56.4; 15:31.6	0+3 1+8; 0+1 1+3; 0+1 0+0; 0+0 0+2; 0+1 0+3	+2:57.5
15	18	Estonia; Regina Oja; Johanna Talihärm; Rene Zahkna; Kalev Ermits	1:05:39.5; 17:05.2; 17:15.8; 15:12.2; 16:06.3	0+4 1+5; 0+1 0+1; 0+0 0+1; 0+2 0+0; 0+1 1+3	+3:11.8
16	20	Lithuania; Natalija Kočergina; Gabrielė Leščinskaitė; Vytautas Strolia; Karol Dombrovski	1:06:50.0; 17:40.0; 17:51.1; 15:15.6; 16:03.3	0+5 0+3; 0+1 0+1; 0+0 0+1; 0+3 0+0; 0+1 0+1	+4:22.3
17	13	Poland; Kinga Zbylut; Kamila Żuk; Grzegorz Guzik; Łukasz Szczurek	LAP; 18:39.1; 17:13.9; 15:35.5	2+4 1+10; 2+3 0+1; 0+0 0+3; 0+1 0+3; 0+0 1+3	
18	21	China; Chu Yuanmeng; Zhang Yan; Li Xuezhi; Tang Jinle	LAP; 17:13.4; 18:04.1	0+2 1+6; 0+0 0+2; 0+0 0+1; 0+2 1+3	
19	16	Slovakia; Terézia Poliaková; Veronika Machyniaková; Martin Otčenáš; Michal Šíma	LAP; 18:37.4; 18:16.5	0+0 0+2; 0+0 0+1; 0+0 0+0; 0+0 0+1	
20	19	Japan; Fuyuko Tachizaki; Sari Maeda; Kosuke Ozaki; Mikito Tachizaki	LAP; 17:25.6; 19:25.0	0+2 5+7; 0+1 0+1; 0+0 3+3; 0+1 2+3	
21	23	Latvia; Baiba Bendika; Jūlija Matvijenko; Aleksandrs Patrijuks; Edgars Mise	LAP; 16:56.4; 19:45.7	0+2 1+8; 0+0 0+2; 0+0 0+3; 0+2 1+3	
22	22	Kazakhstan; Galina Vishnevskaya; Yelizaveta Belchenko; Alexandr Mukhin; Vladislav Kireyev	LAP; 18:36.7; 18:09.9	0+7 5+9; 0+3 0+3; 0+2 1+3; 0+2 4+3	
23	15	Slovenia; Nika Vindišar; Lea Einfalt; Klemen Bauer; Rok Tršan	LAP; 18:46.4; 18:00.8	2+8 0+8; 1+3 0+3; 0+2 0+2; 1+3 0+3	
24	17	Bulgaria; Daniela Kadeva; Maria Zdravkova; Vladimir Iliev; Dimitar Gerdzhikov	LAP; 19:04.2	0+4 1+5; 0+3 1+3; 0+1 0+2	
25	27	Belgium; Lotte Lie; Rieke De Meyer; Thierry Langer; Tom Lahaye-Goffart	LAP; 18:03.7	0+2 0+0; 0+1 0+0; 0+1 0+0	
26	26	Romania; Enikő Márton; Ana Cotrus; George Buta; Cornel Puchianu	LAP; 20:58.6	0+1 3+3; 0+1 3+3; 0+0	
27	25	South Korea; Anna Frolina; Mariya Abe; Timofey Lapshin; Choi Du-jin	LAP; 18:50.9	6+6 0+1; 2+3 0+1; 4+3	
