= 2021–22 Biathlon World Cup =

Biathlon competition

| Discipline | Men | Women |
| Overall | (France) Quentin Fillon Maillet (1) | (Norway) Marte Olsbu Røiseland (1) |
| U25 | (Norway) Sturla Holm Lægreid (2) | (Sweden) Elvira Öberg (1) |
| Individual | (Norway) Tarjei Bø (1) | (Czech Republic) Markéta Davidová (1) |
| Sprint | (France) Quentin Fillon Maillet (1) | (Norway) Marte Olsbu Røiseland (1) |
| Pursuit | (France) Quentin Fillon Maillet (1) | (Norway) Marte Olsbu Røiseland (1) |
| Mass start | (Norway) Sivert Guttorm Bakken (1) | (France) Justine Braisaz-Bouchet (1) |
| Relay | Norway (13) | Sweden (2) |
| Nations Cup | Norway (18) | Norway (7) |
- Mixed: Norway (8)

Competition
| Edition | 45th | 40th |
| Locations | 9 | 9 |
| Individual | 22 | 22 |
| Relay/Team | 5 | 5 |
| Mixed | 4 | 4 |
| Rescheduled | 1 | 1 |

Overall Champions

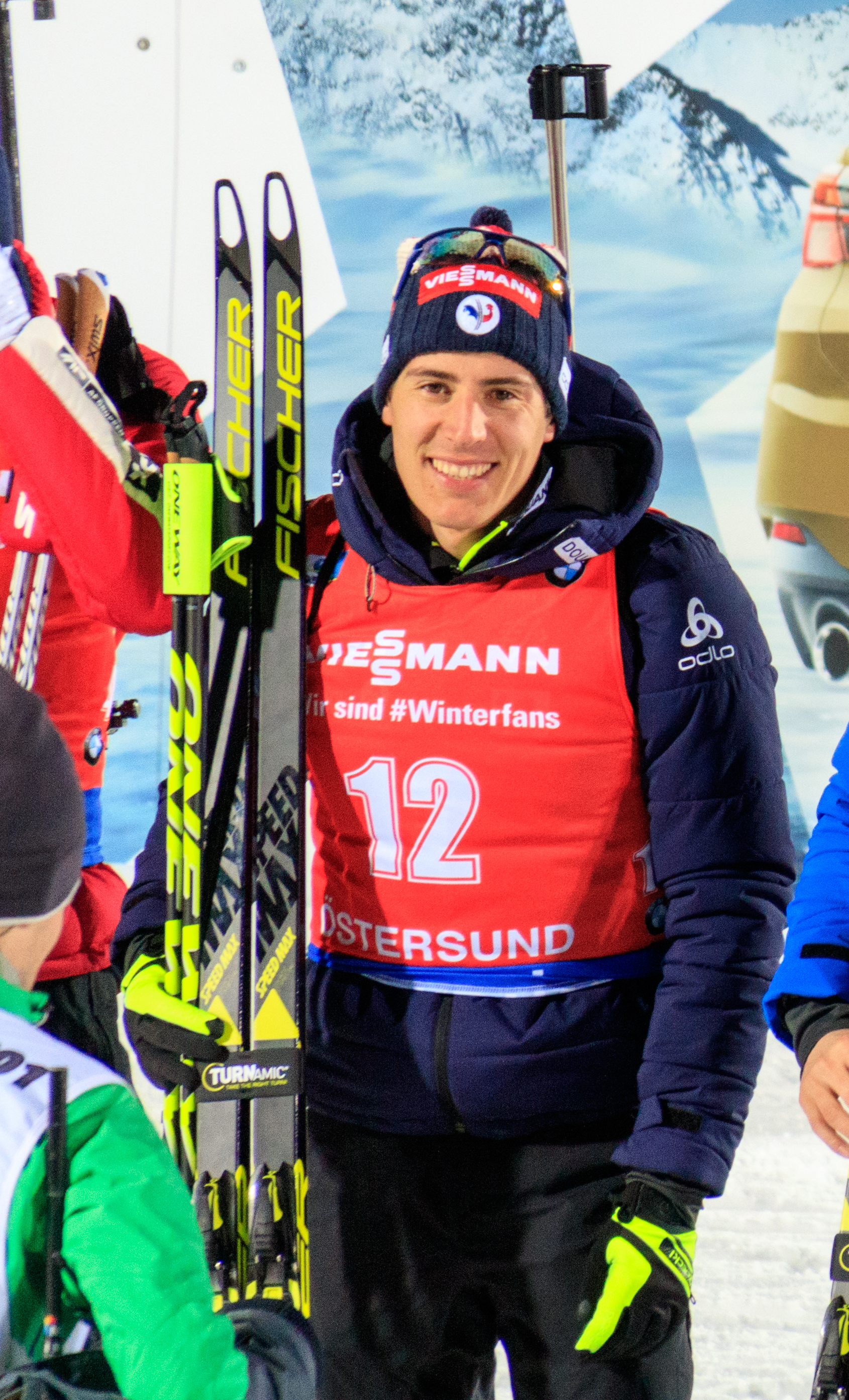
Quentin Fillon Maillet won his first overall World Cup title being in 3rd place overall in the last three seasons.

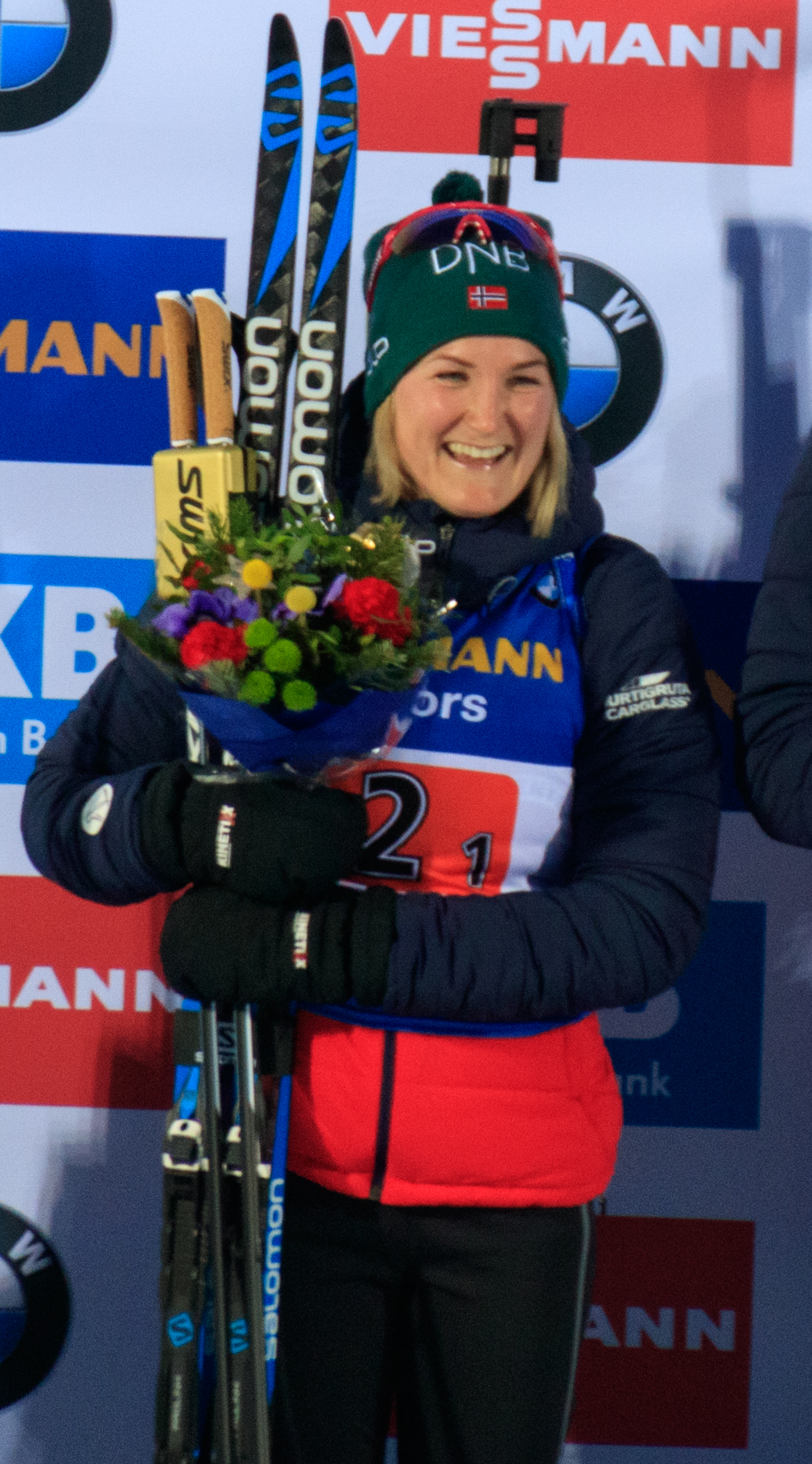
Marte Olsbu Røiseland won her first overall World Cup title in history, improving the second overall position achieved in the previous season.

The 2021–22 Biathlon World Cup (BWC) was a multi-race series over a season of biathlon, organised by the International Biathlon Union. The season started on 27 November 2021 in Östersund, Sweden and ended on 20 March 2022 in Oslo Holmenkollen, Norway.

Norwegians Johannes Thingnes Bø and Tiril Eckhoff were the defending overall champions from the 2020–21 season.

For the first time in the history of the Biathlon World Cup, the competition will be held in Estonia, specifically in Otepää.

Due to the Russian invasion of Ukraine, Russian and Belarusian biathletes are only allowed to compete under a neutral flag since the competition in Kontiolahti. Their performances are not included in the previous classifications of their countries. Previously, the Ukrainian national team announced the withdrawal from the biathlon competition by the end of the season.

On 2 March 2022, IBU announced that Russian and Belarusian biathletes are banned from IBU events.

Polish biathlete Magdalena Gwizdoń starting in the sprint in Otepää broke the all-time record of the World Cup (starting in her 27th season). The previous record for starting in 26 seasons was held by Ole Einar Bjørndalen.

== Calendar ==
Regular stage
Olympic Games

Below is the IBU World Cup calendar for the 2021–22 season. The 2022 Olympic Games events are not included into the Biathlon World Cup score.

| Stage | Location | Date | Individual | Sprint | Pursuit | Mass start | Relay | Mixed relay | Single mixed relay | Details |
|---|---|---|---|---|---|---|---|---|---|---|
| 1 | (Sweden) Östersund | 27–28 November | ● | ● | | | | | | details |
| 2 | (Sweden) Östersund | 2–5 December | | ● | ● | | ● | | | details |
| 3 | (Austria) Hochfilzen | 10–12 December | | ● | ● | | ● | | | details |
| 4 | (France) Annecy-Le Grand-Bornand | 16–19 December | | ● | ● | ● | | | | details |
| 5 | (Germany) Oberhof | 7–9 January | | ● | ● | | | ● | ● | details |
| 6 | (Germany) Ruhpolding | 12–16 January | | ● | ● | | ● | | | details |
| 7 | (Italy) Antholz-Anterselva | 20–23 January | ● | | | ● | ● | | | details |
| OG | (China) Beijing | 5–18 February | ● | ● | ● | ● | ● | ● | | details |
| 8 | (Finland) Kontiolahti | 3–6 March | | ● | ● | | ● | | | details |
| 9 | (Estonia) Otepää | 10–13 March | | ● | | ● | | ● | ● | details |
| 10 | (Norway) Oslo Holmenkollen | 17–20 March | | ● | ● | ● | | | | details |
| Total: 58 (27 men's, 27 women's, 4 mixed) | | | 2 | 9 | 7 | 4 | 5 | 2 | 2 | |

== Men ==
=== Calendar ===
| Stage | Date | Place | Discipline | Winner | Second | Third | Yellow bib (After competition) | Dark blue bib (After competition) | Ref. |
|---|---|---|---|---|---|---|---|---|---|
| 1 | 27 November 2021 | (Sweden) Östersund | 20 km Individual | (Norway) Sturla Holm Lægreid | (Norway) Tarjei Bø | (France) Simon Desthieux | (Norway) Sturla Holm Lægreid | (Norway) Sturla Holm Lægreid | |
| 1 | 28 November 2021 | (Sweden) Östersund | 10 km Sprint | (Sweden) Sebastian Samuelsson | (Norway) Vetle Sjåstad Christiansen | (Norway) Johannes Thingnes Bø | (Norway) Johannes Thingnes Bø (France) Simon Desthieux | (Norway) Sivert Guttorm Bakken | |
| 2 | 2 December 2021 | (Sweden) Östersund | 10 km Sprint | (Sweden) Sebastian Samuelsson | (France) Émilien Jacquelin | (France) Quentin Fillon Maillet | (Sweden) Sebastian Samuelsson | (Sweden) Sebastian Samuelsson | |
| 2 | 5 December 2021 | (Sweden) Östersund | 12.5 km Pursuit | (Norway) Vetle Sjåstad Christiansen | (Sweden) Sebastian Samuelsson | (France) Émilien Jacquelin | (Norway) Vetle Sjåstad Christiansen | (Sweden) Sebastian Samuelsson | |
| 3 | 10 December 2021 | (Austria) Hochfilzen | 10 km Sprint | (Germany) Johannes Kühn | (Sweden) Martin Ponsiluoma | (Belarus) Anton Smolski | (Norway) Vetle Sjåstad Christiansen | (Sweden) Sebastian Samuelsson | |
| 3 | 11 December 2021 | (Austria) Hochfilzen | 12.5 km Pursuit | (France) Quentin Fillon Maillet | (France) Émilien Jacquelin | (Sweden) Sebastian Samuelsson | (Sweden) Sebastian Samuelsson | (Sweden) Sebastian Samuelsson | |
| 4 | 17 December 2021 | (France) Le Grand-Bornand | 10 km Sprint | (Norway) Johannes Thingnes Bø | (Russia) Eduard Latypov | (Norway) Filip Fjeld Andersen | (Sweden) Sebastian Samuelsson | (Sweden) Sebastian Samuelsson | |
| 4 | 18 December 2021 | (France) Le Grand-Bornand | 12.5 km Pursuit | (France) Quentin Fillon Maillet | (Russia) Eduard Latypov | (Norway) Vetle Sjåstad Christiansen | (France) Quentin Fillon Maillet | (Sweden) Sebastian Samuelsson | |
| 4 | 19 December 2021 | (France) Le Grand-Bornand | 15 km Mass Start | (France) Émilien Jacquelin | (France) Quentin Fillon Maillet | (Norway) Tarjei Bø | (France) Émilien Jacquelin | (Sweden) Sebastian Samuelsson | |
| 5 | 7 January 2022 (Note: Men's Sprint originally scheduled for 6 January 2022 (Thursday), was rescheduled to 7 January 2022 (Friday), due to warm weather and rain.) | (Germany) Oberhof | 10 km Sprint | (Russia) Alexandr Loginov | (France) Émilien Jacquelin | (Norway) Sturla Holm Lægreid | (France) Émilien Jacquelin | (Sweden) Sebastian Samuelsson | |
| 5 | 9 January 2022 | (Germany) Oberhof | 12.5 km Pursuit | (France) Quentin Fillon Maillet | (Sweden) Sebastian Samuelsson | (Norway) Tarjei Bø | (France) Quentin Fillon Maillet | (Sweden) Sebastian Samuelsson | |
| 6 | 13 January 2022 | (Germany) Ruhpolding | 10 km Sprint | (France) Quentin Fillon Maillet | (Germany) Benedikt Doll | (Belarus) Anton Smolski | (France) Quentin Fillon Maillet | (Sweden) Sebastian Samuelsson | |
| 6 | 16 January 2022 | (Germany) Ruhpolding | 12.5 km Pursuit | (France) Quentin Fillon Maillet | (Russia) Alexandr Loginov | (Belarus) Anton Smolski | (France) Quentin Fillon Maillet | (Sweden) Sebastian Samuelsson | |
| 7 | 20 January 2022 | (Italy) Antholz-Anterselva | 20 km Individual | (Russia) Anton Babikov | (Norway) Tarjei Bø | (Russia) Said Karimulla Khalili | (France) Quentin Fillon Maillet | (Sweden) Sebastian Samuelsson | |
| 7 | 22 January 2022 | (Italy) Antholz-Anterselva | 15 km Mass Start | (Germany) Benedikt Doll | (Norway) Johannes Thingnes Bø | (Norway) Sturla Holm Lægreid | (France) Quentin Fillon Maillet | (Sweden) Sebastian Samuelsson | |
| OG | 8 February 2022 | (China) Beijing | 20 km Individual | (France) Quentin Fillon Maillet | (Belarus) Anton Smolski | (Norway) Johannes Thingnes Bø | — | — | |
| OG | 12 February 2022 | (China) Beijing | 10 km Sprint | (Norway) Johannes Thingnes Bø | (France) Quentin Fillon Maillet | (Norway) Tarjei Bø | — | — | |
| OG | 13 February 2022 | (China) Beijing | 12.5 km Pursuit | (France) Quentin Fillon Maillet | (Norway) Tarjei Bø | (Russia) Eduard Latypov | — | — | |
| OG | 18 February 2022 | (China) Beijing | 15 km Mass Start | (Norway) Johannes Thingnes Bø | (Sweden) Martin Ponsiluoma | (Norway) Vetle Sjåstad Christiansen | — | — | |
| 8 | 5 March 2022 | (Finland) Kontiolahti | 10 km Sprint | (France) Quentin Fillon Maillet | (Norway) Filip Fjeld Andersen | (Germany) Johannes Kühn | (France) Quentin Fillon Maillet | (Sweden) Sebastian Samuelsson | |
| 8 | 6 March 2022 | (Finland) Kontiolahti | 12.5 km Pursuit | (France) Quentin Fillon Maillet | (Germany) Erik Lesser | (Italy) Lukas Hofer | (France) Quentin Fillon Maillet | (Sweden) Sebastian Samuelsson | |
| 9 | 10 March 2022 | (Estonia) Otepää | 10 km Sprint | (France) Quentin Fillon Maillet | (Norway) Sturla Holm Lægreid | (Germany) Benedikt Doll | (France) Quentin Fillon Maillet | (Sweden) Sebastian Samuelsson | |
| 9 | 12 March 2022 | (Estonia) Otepää | 15 km Mass Start | (Norway) Vetle Sjåstad Christiansen | (France) Quentin Fillon Maillet | (Norway) Sivert Guttorm Bakken | (France) Quentin Fillon Maillet | (Sweden) Sebastian Samuelsson | |
| 10 | 18 March 2022 | (Norway) Oslo Holmenkollen | 10 km Sprint | (Norway) Sturla Holm Lægreid | (France) Quentin Fillon Maillet | (Sweden) Sebastian Samuelsson | (France) Quentin Fillon Maillet | (Sweden) Sebastian Samuelsson | |
| 10 | 19 March 2022 | (Norway) Oslo Holmenkollen | 12.5 km Pursuit | (Germany) Erik Lesser | (France) Quentin Fillon Maillet | (Norway) Sturla Holm Lægreid | (France) Quentin Fillon Maillet | (Sweden) Sebastian Samuelsson | |
| 10 | 20 March 2022 | (Norway) Oslo Holmenkollen | 15 km Mass Start | (Norway) Sivert Guttorm Bakken | (Norway) Sturla Holm Lægreid | (France) Émilien Jacquelin | (France) Quentin Fillon Maillet | (Norway) Sturla Holm Lægreid | |

=== Relay – 4 x 7.5 km ===
| Stage | Date | Place | Winner | Second | Third | Leader (After competition) | Ref. |
|---|---|---|---|---|---|---|---|
| 2 | 4 December 2021 | (Sweden) Östersund | Norway Sivert Guttorm Bakken; Tarjei Bø; Johannes Thingnes Bø; Vetle Sjåstad Christiansen | France Fabien Claude; Émilien Jacquelin; Simon Desthieux; Quentin Fillon Maillet | Russia Said Karimulla Khalili; Daniil Serokhvostov; Alexandr Loginov; Eduard Latypov | Norway | |
| 3 | 12 December 2021 | (Austria) Hochfilzen | Norway Sturla Holm Lægreid; Tarjei Bø; Johannes Thingnes Bø; Vetle Sjåstad Christiansen | France Fabien Claude; Simon Desthieux; Émilien Jacquelin; Quentin Fillon Maillet | Russia Vasilii Tomshin; Daniil Serokhvostov; Alexandr Loginov; Eduard Latypov | Norway | |
| 6 | 15 January 2022 | (Germany) Ruhpolding | Russia Said Karimulla Khalili; Daniil Serokhvostov; Alexandr Loginov; Maxim Tsvetkov | Germany Erik Lesser; Roman Rees; Benedikt Doll; Philipp Nawrath | Belarus Mikita Labastau; Dzmitry Lazouski; Maksim Varabei; Anton Smolski | Norway | |
| 7 | 23 January 2022 | (Italy) Antholz-Anterselva | Norway Sturla Holm Lægreid; Tarjei Bø; Johannes Thingnes Bø; Vetle Sjåstad Christiansen | Russia Anton Babikov; Daniil Serokhvostov; Alexandr Loginov; Eduard Latypov | Germany Roman Rees; Philipp Horn; David Zobel; Lucas Fratzscher | Norway | |
| OG | 15 February 2022 | (China) Beijing | Norway Sturla Holm Lægreid; Tarjei Bø; Johannes Thingnes Bø; Vetle Sjåstad Christiansen | France Fabien Claude; Émilien Jacquelin; Simon Desthieux; Quentin Fillon Maillet | (Russia) ROC Said Karimulla Khalili; Alexandr Loginov; Maxim Tsvetkov; Eduard Latypov | — | |
| 8 | 4 March 2022 | (Finland) Kontiolahti | Norway Sivert Guttorm Bakken; Filip Fjeld Andersen; Sturla Holm Lægreid; Vetle Sjåstad Christiansen | Sweden Peppe Femling; Jesper Nelin; Martin Ponsiluoma; Sebastian Samuelsson | France Antonin Guigonnat; Émilien Jacquelin; Simon Desthieux; Quentin Fillon Maillet | Norway | |

=== Standings ===
==== Overall ====
| Rank | after all 22 races | Points |
|---|---|---|
| Yellow bib | (France) Quentin Fillon Maillet | 984 |
| 2. | (Norway) Sturla Holm Lægreid | 736 |
| 3. | (Sweden) Sebastian Samuelsson | 717 |
| 4. | (Norway) Vetle Sjåstad Christiansen | 708 |
| 5. | (France) Émilien Jacquelin | 706 |
| 6. | (Norway) Tarjei Bø | 601 |
| 7. | (France) Simon Desthieux | 590 |
| 8. | (Germany) Benedikt Doll | 557 |
| 9. | (Norway) Sivert Guttorm Bakken | 553 |
| 10. | (Germany) Erik Lesser | 535 |

==== Under 25 ====
| Rank | after all 22 races | Points |
|---|---|---|
| Dark blue bib | (Norway) Sturla Holm Lægreid | 736 |
| 2. | (Sweden) Sebastian Samuelsson | 717 |
| 3. | (Norway) Sivert Guttorm Bakken | 553 |
| 4. | (Norway) Filip Fjeld Andersen | 403 |
| 5. | (Russia) Said Karimulla Khalili | 222 |
| 6. | (Russia) Daniil Serokhvostov | 199 |
| 7. | (Norway) Aleksander Fjeld Andersen | 165 |
| 8. | (Italy) Tommaso Giacomel | 160 |
| 9. | (Switzerland) Sebastian Stalder | 119 |
| 10. | (Belarus) Dzmitry Lazouski | 113 |

==== Individual ====
| Rank | after all 2 races | Points |
|---|---|---|
| Red bib | (Norway) Tarjei Bø | 108 |
| 2. | (Norway) Sturla Holm Lægreid | 100 |
| 3. | (France) Simon Desthieux | 86 |
| 4. | (Norway) Johannes Thingnes Bø | 83 |
| 5. | (France) Fabien Claude | 64 |

==== Sprint ====
| Rank | after all 9 races | Points |
|---|---|---|
| Red bib | (France) Quentin Fillon Maillet | 402 |
| 2. | (Sweden) Sebastian Samuelsson | 340 |
| 3. | (Norway) Sturla Holm Lægreid | 284 |
| 4. | (France) Émilien Jacquelin | 283 |
| 5. | (Norway) Vetle Sjåstad Christiansen | 274 |

==== Pursuit ====
| Rank | after all 7 races | Points |
|---|---|---|
| Red bib | (France) Quentin Fillon Maillet | 379 |
| 2. | (Sweden) Sebastian Samuelsson | 282 |
| 3. | (Germany) Erik Lesser | 253 |
| 4. | (France) Émilien Jacquelin | 244 |
| 5. | (Norway) Vetle Sjåstad Christiansen | 217 |

==== Mass start ====
| Rank | after all 4 races | Points |
|---|---|---|
| Red bib | (Norway) Sivert Guttorm Bakken | 182 |
| 2. | (France) Quentin Fillon Maillet | 178 |
| 3. | (Norway) Vetle Sjåstad Christiansen | 165 |
| 4. | (Norway) Sturla Holm Lægreid | 153 |
| 5. | (France) Émilien Jacquelin | 142 |

==== Relay ====
| Rank | after all 5 races | Points |
|---|---|---|
| 1. | Norway | 276 |
| 2. | France | 239 |
| 3. | Germany | 231 |
| 4. | Russia | 210 |
| 5. | Sweden | 188 |

==== Nation ====
| Rank | after all 20 races | Points |
|---|---|---|
| 1. | Norway | 7277 |
| 2. | France | 6954 |
| 3. | Germany | 6707 |
| 4. | Sweden | 5851 |
| 5. | Italy | 5475 |

== Women ==
=== Calendar ===
| Stage | Date | Place | Discipline | Winner | Second | Third | Yellow bib (After competition) | Dark blue bib (After competition) | Ref. |
|---|---|---|---|---|---|---|---|---|---|
| 1 | 27 November 2021 | (Sweden) Östersund | 15 km Individual | (Czech Republic) Markéta Davidová | (Austria) Lisa Theresa Hauser | (Germany) Denise Herrmann | (Czech Republic) Markéta Davidová | (Czech Republic) Markéta Davidová | |
| 1 | 28 November 2021 | (Sweden) Östersund | 7.5 km Sprint | (Sweden) Hanna Öberg | (France) Anaïs Chevalier-Bouchet | (Norway) Marte Olsbu Røiseland | (Czech Republic) Markéta Davidová | (Czech Republic) Markéta Davidová | |
| 2 | 2 December 2021 | (Sweden) Östersund | 7.5 km Sprint | (Austria) Lisa Theresa Hauser | (Sweden) Elvira Öberg | (Belarus) Hanna Sola | (Austria) Lisa Theresa Hauser | (Sweden) Elvira Öberg | |
| 2 | 4 December 2021 | (Sweden) Östersund | 10 km Pursuit | (Norway) Marte Olsbu Røiseland | (France) Anaïs Bescond | (France) Anaïs Chevalier-Bouchet | (Austria) Lisa Theresa Hauser | (Sweden) Elvira Öberg | |
| 3 | 10 December 2021 | (Austria) Hochfilzen | 7.5 km Sprint | (Belarus) Hanna Sola | (France) Justine Braisaz-Bouchet | (Norway) Marte Olsbu Røiseland | (Norway) Marte Olsbu Røiseland | (Sweden) Elvira Öberg | |
| 3 | 12 December 2021 | (Austria) Hochfilzen | 10 km Pursuit | (Norway) Marte Olsbu Røiseland | (Belarus) Hanna Sola | (Sweden) Elvira Öberg | (Norway) Marte Olsbu Røiseland | (Sweden) Elvira Öberg | |
| 4 | 16 December 2021 | (France) Le Grand-Bornand | 7.5 km Sprint | (Norway) Marte Olsbu Røiseland | (France) Anaïs Bescond | (Sweden) Elvira Öberg | (Norway) Marte Olsbu Røiseland | (Sweden) Elvira Öberg | |
| 4 | 18 December 2021 | (France) Le Grand-Bornand | 10 km Pursuit | (Sweden) Elvira Öberg | (France) Julia Simon | (Sweden) Hanna Öberg | (Norway) Marte Olsbu Røiseland | (Sweden) Elvira Öberg | |
| 4 | 19 December 2021 | (France) Le Grand-Bornand | 12.5 km Mass Start | (Sweden) Elvira Öberg | (France) Julia Simon | (Russia) Kristina Reztsova | (Norway) Marte Olsbu Røiseland | (Sweden) Elvira Öberg | |
| 5 | 7 January 2022 | (Germany) Oberhof | 7.5 km Sprint | (Norway) Marte Olsbu Røiseland | (France) Julia Simon (Belarus) Hanna Sola | | (Norway) Marte Olsbu Røiseland | (Sweden) Elvira Öberg | |
| 5 | 9 January 2022 | (Germany) Oberhof | 10 km Pursuit | (Norway) Marte Olsbu Røiseland | (Sweden) Hanna Öberg | (Belarus) Dzinara Alimbekava | (Norway) Marte Olsbu Røiseland | (Sweden) Elvira Öberg | |
| 6 | 12 January 2022 | (Germany) Ruhpolding | 7.5 km Sprint | (Sweden) Elvira Öberg | (Norway) Marte Olsbu Røiseland | (Italy) Dorothea Wierer | (Norway) Marte Olsbu Røiseland | (Sweden) Elvira Öberg | |
| 6 | 16 January 2022 | (Germany) Ruhpolding | 10 km Pursuit | (Norway) Marte Olsbu Røiseland | (Sweden) Elvira Öberg | (Sweden) Hanna Öberg | (Norway) Marte Olsbu Røiseland | (Sweden) Elvira Öberg | |
| 7 | 21 January 2022 | (Italy) Antholz-Anterselva | 15 km Individual | (France) Justine Braisaz-Bouchet | (France) Julia Simon | (Sweden) Mona Brorsson | (Norway) Marte Olsbu Røiseland | (Sweden) Elvira Öberg | |
| 7 | 23 January 2022 | (Italy) Antholz-Anterselva | 12.5 km Mass Start | (Italy) Dorothea Wierer | (Belarus) Dzinara Alimbekava | (France) Anaïs Chevalier-Bouchet | (Norway) Marte Olsbu Røiseland | (Sweden) Elvira Öberg | |
| OG | 7 February 2022 | (China) Beijing | 15 km Individual | (Germany) Denise Herrmann | (France) Anaïs Chevalier-Bouchet | (Norway) Marte Olsbu Røiseland | — | — | |
| OG | 11 February 2022 | (China) Beijing | 7.5 km Sprint | (Norway) Marte Olsbu Røiseland | (Sweden) Elvira Öberg | (Italy) Dorothea Wierer | — | — | |
| OG | 13 February 2022 | (China) Beijing | 10 km Pursuit | (Norway) Marte Olsbu Røiseland | (Sweden) Elvira Öberg | (Norway) Tiril Eckhoff | — | — | |
| OG | 18 February 2022 | (China) Beijing | 12.5 km Mass Start | (France) Justine Braisaz-Bouchet | (Norway) Tiril Eckhoff | (Norway) Marte Olsbu Røiseland | — | — | |
| 8 | 5 March 2022 | (Finland) Kontiolahti | 7.5 km Sprint | (Germany) Denise Herrmann | (Norway) Tiril Eckhoff | (Sweden) Stina Nilsson | (Norway) Marte Olsbu Røiseland | (Sweden) Elvira Öberg | |
| 8 | 6 March 2022 | (Finland) Kontiolahti | 10 km Pursuit | (Norway) Tiril Eckhoff | (Italy) Dorothea Wierer | (Germany) Denise Herrmann | (Norway) Marte Olsbu Røiseland | (Sweden) Elvira Öberg | |
| 9 | 11 March 2022 | (Estonia) Otepää | 7.5 km Sprint | (France) Julia Simon | (Germany) Vanessa Voigt | (Norway) Karoline Offigstad Knotten | (Norway) Marte Olsbu Røiseland | (Sweden) Elvira Öberg | |
| 9 | 12 March 2022 | (Estonia) Otepää | 12.5 km Mass Start | (Sweden) Elvira Öberg | (Germany) Denise Herrmann | (Norway) Marte Olsbu Røiseland | (Norway) Marte Olsbu Røiseland | (Sweden) Elvira Öberg | |
| 10 | 18 March 2022 (Note: Women's Sprint originally scheduled for 17 March 2022 (Thursday), was rescheduled to 18 March 2022 (Friday), due to warm weather.) | (Norway) Oslo Holmenkollen | 7.5 km Sprint | (Norway) Tiril Eckhoff | (Austria) Lisa Theresa Hauser | (Norway) Marte Olsbu Røiseland | (Norway) Marte Olsbu Røiseland | (Sweden) Elvira Öberg | |
| 10 | 19 March 2022 | (Norway) Oslo Holmenkollen | 10 km Pursuit | (Norway) Tiril Eckhoff | (Norway) Marte Olsbu Røiseland | (Slovakia) Paulína Fialková | (Norway) Marte Olsbu Røiseland | (Sweden) Elvira Öberg | |
| 10 | 20 March 2022 | (Norway) Oslo Holmenkollen | 12.5 km Mass Start | (France) Justine Braisaz-Bouchet | (Germany) Franziska Preuß | (Norway) Marte Olsbu Røiseland | (Norway) Marte Olsbu Røiseland | (Sweden) Elvira Öberg | |

=== Relay – 4 x 6 km ===
| Stage | Date | Place | Winner | Second | Third | Leader (After competition) | Ref. |
|---|---|---|---|---|---|---|---|
| 2 | 5 December 2021 | (Sweden) Östersund | France Anaïs Bescond; Anaïs Chevalier-Bouchet; Julia Simon; Justine Braisaz-Bouchet | Belarus Iryna Leshchanka; Dzinara Alimbekava; Elena Kruchinkina; Hanna Sola | Sweden Linn Persson; Mona Brorsson; Elvira Öberg; Hanna Öberg | France | |
| 3 | 11 December 2021 | (Austria) Hochfilzen | Sweden Linn Persson; Anna Magnusson; Elvira Öberg; Hanna Öberg | Russia Valeriia Vasnetsova; Svetlana Mironova; Uliana Nigmatullina; Kristina Reztsova | France Anaïs Bescond; Anaïs Chevalier-Bouchet; Chloé Chevalier; Justine Braisaz-Bouchet | France; Sweden | |
| 6 | 14 January 2022 | (Germany) Ruhpolding | France Anaïs Chevalier-Bouchet; Chloé Chevalier; Justine Braisaz-Bouchet; Julia Simon | Sweden Johanna Skottheim; Stina Nilsson; Mona Brorsson; Anna Magnusson | Russia Valeriia Vasnetsova; Svetlana Mironova; Irina Kazakevich; Kristina Reztsova | France | |
| 7 | 22 January 2022 | (Italy) Antholz-Anterselva | Norway Karoline Offigstad Knotten; Tiril Eckhoff; Ida Lien; Ingrid Landmark Tandrevold | Russia Valeriia Vasnetsova; Kristina Reztsova; Svetlana Mironova; Uliana Nigmatullina | France Chloé Chevalier; Justine Braisaz-Bouchet; Paula Botet; Anaïs Bescond | France | |
| OG | 16 February 2022 | (China) Beijing | Sweden Linn Persson; Mona Brorsson; Hanna Öberg; Elvira Öberg | (Russia) ROC Irina Kazakevich; Kristina Reztsova; Svetlana Mironova; Uliana Nigmatullina | Germany Vanessa Voigt; Vanessa Hinz; Franziska Preuß; Denise Herrmann | — | |
| 8 | 3 March 2022 | (Finland) Kontiolahti | Norway Marte Olsbu Røiseland; Tiril Eckhoff; Ida Lien; Ingrid Landmark Tandrevold | Sweden Linn Persson; Anna Magnusson; Hanna Öberg; Elvira Öberg | Italy Samuela Comola; Dorothea Wierer; Federica Sanfilippo; Lisa Vittozzi | Sweden | |

=== Standings ===
==== Overall ====
| Rank | after all 22 races | Points |
|---|---|---|
| Yellow bib | (Norway) Marte Olsbu Røiseland | 957 |
| 2. | (Sweden) Elvira Öberg | 823 |
| 3. | (Austria) Lisa Theresa Hauser | 684 |
| 4. | (Sweden) Hanna Öberg | 661 |
| 5. | (France) Anaïs Chevalier-Bouchet | 642 |
| 6. | (Germany) Denise Herrmann | 589 |
| 7. | (Belarus) Dzinara Alimbekava | 589 |
| 8. | (France) Justine Braisaz-Bouchet | 581 |
| 9. | (Italy) Dorothea Wierer | 577 |
| 10. | (Czech Republic) Markéta Davidová | 560 |

==== Under 25 ====
| Rank | after all 22 races | Points |
|---|---|---|
| Dark blue bib | (Sweden) Elvira Öberg | 823 |
| 2. | (Czech Republic) Markéta Davidová | 560 |
| 3. | (Germany) Vanessa Voigt | 522 |
| 4. | (Russia) Irina Kazakevich | 189 |
| 5. | (Norway) Ida Lien | 187 |
| 6. | (Russia) Valeriia Vasnetsova | 153 |
| 7. | (Bulgaria) Milena Todorova | 97 |
| 8. | (Norway) Emilie Ågheim Kalkenberg | 81 |
| 9. | (Norway) Karoline Erdal | 61 |
| 10. | (Poland) Kamila Żuk | 41 |

==== Individual ====
| Rank | after all 2 races | Points |
|---|---|---|
| Red bib | (Czech Republic) Markéta Davidová | 98 |
| 2. | (Austria) Lisa Theresa Hauser | 86 |
| 3. | (Belarus) Dzinara Alimbekava | 79 |
| 4. | (Sweden) Mona Brorsson | 78 |
| 5. | (Russia) Uliana Nigmatullina | 71 |

==== Sprint ====
| Rank | after all 9 races | Points |
|---|---|---|
| Red bib | (Norway) Marte Olsbu Røiseland | 412 |
| 2. | (Sweden) Elvira Öberg | 340 |
| 3. | (Sweden) Hanna Öberg | 306 |
| 4. | (Austria) Lisa Theresa Hauser | 300 |
| 5. | (France) Anaïs Chevalier-Bouchet | 289 |

==== Pursuit ====
| Rank | after all 7 races | Points |
|---|---|---|
| Red bib | (Norway) Marte Olsbu Røiseland | 380 |
| 2. | (Sweden) Elvira Öberg | 300 |
| 3. | (Sweden) Hanna Öberg | 262 |
| 4. | (France) Anaïs Chevalier-Bouchet | 240 |
| 5. | (Austria) Lisa Theresa Hauser | 222 |

==== Mass start ====
| Rank | after all 4 races | Points |
|---|---|---|
| Red bib | (France) Justine Braisaz-Bouchet | 162 |
| 2. | (Sweden) Elvira Öberg | 160 |
| 3. | (Italy) Dorothea Wierer | 152 |
| 4. | (Norway) Marte Olsbu Røiseland | 134 |
| 5. | (Norway) Ingrid Landmark Tandrevold | 120 |

==== Relay ====
| Rank | after all 5 races | Points |
|---|---|---|
| 1. | Sweden | 243 |
| 2. | Norway | 235 |
| 3. | France | 216 |
| 4. | Germany | 203 |
| 5. | Italy | 195 |

==== Nation ====
| Rank | after all 20 races | Points |
|---|---|---|
| 1. | Norway | 6856 |
| 2. | Sweden | 6765 |
| 3. | France | 6572 |
| 4. | Germany | 6402 |
| 5. | Czech Republic | 5488 |

== Mixed Relay ==
| Stage | Date | Place | Discipline | Winner | Second | Third | Leader (After competition) | Ref. |
|---|---|---|---|---|---|---|---|---|
| 5 | 8 January 2022 | (Germany) Oberhof | 4 x 7.5 km | Norway Tarjei Bø; Johannes Thingnes Bø; Ingrid Landmark Tandrevold; Marte Olsbu Røiseland | Belarus Mikita Labastau; Anton Smolski; Dzinara Alimbekava; Hanna Sola | France Antonin Guigonnat; Simon Desthieux; Anaïs Bescond; Julia Simon | Norway | |
| 5 | 8 January 2022 | (Germany) Oberhof | 1 x 6 km + 1 x 7.5 km | Russia Anton Babikov; Kristina Reztsova | Austria Simon Eder; Lisa Theresa Hauser | Ukraine Artem Tyshchenko; Darya Blashko | Russia | |
| OG | 5 February 2022 | (China) Beijing | 4 x 6 km | Norway Marte Olsbu Røiseland; Tiril Eckhoff; Tarjei Bø; Johannes Thingnes Bø | France Anaïs Chevalier-Bouchet; Julia Simon; Émilien Jacquelin; Quentin Fillon Maillet | (Russia) ROC Uliana Nigmatullina; Kristina Reztsova; Alexandr Loginov; Eduard Latypov | — | |
| 9 | 13 March 2022 | (Estonia) Otepää | 4 x 7.5 km | Norway Sivert Guttorm Bakken; Vetle Sjåstad Christiansen; Tiril Eckhoff; Ingrid Landmark Tandrevold | Sweden Jesper Nelin; Martin Ponsiluoma; Linn Persson; Elvira Öberg | France Simon Desthieux; Quentin Fillon Maillet; Chloé Chevalier; Justine Braisaz-Bouchet | Norway | |
| 9 | 13 March 2022 | (Estonia) Otepää | 1 x 6 km + 1 x 7.5 km | Norway Sturla Holm Lægreid; Marte Olsbu Røiseland | Sweden Sebastian Samuelsson; Hanna Öberg | Germany Erik Lesser; Franziska Preuß | Norway | |

=== Rankings ===
| Rank | after all 4 races | Points |
|---|---|---|
| 1. | Norway | 205 |
| 2. | Sweden | 191 |
| 3. | France | 169 |
| 4. | Germany | 165 |
| 5. | Austria | 154 |

== Podium table by nation ==
Table showing the World Cup podium places (gold–1st place, silver–2nd place, bronze–3rd place) by the countries represented by the athletes.

| Rank | Nation | Gold | Silver | Bronze | Total |
|---|---|---|---|---|---|
| 1 | Norway | 24 | 10 | 15 | 49 |
| 2 | France | 14 | 17 | 11 | 42 |
| 3 | Sweden | 8 | 11 | 9 | 28 |
| 4 | Germany | 4 | 6 | 6 | 16 |
| 5 | Russia | 4 | 5 | 2 | 11 |
| 6 | Belarus | 1 | 5 | 6 | 12 |
| 7 | Austria | 1 | 3 | 0 | 4 |
| 8 | Italy | 1 | 1 | 3 | 5 |
| 9 | Czech Republic | 1 | 0 | 0 | 1 |
| 10 | (Russia) ROC | 0 | 1 | 3 | 4 |
| 11 | Slovakia | 0 | 0 | 1 | 1 |
| 11 | Ukraine | 0 | 0 | 1 | 1 |
| Totals (12 entries) | | 58 | 59 | 57 | 174 |

== Points distribution ==
The table shows the number of points won in the 2021–22 Biathlon World Cup for men and women. Relay events do not impact individual rankings.

| Place | 1 | 2 | 3 | 4 | 5 | 6 | 7 | 8 | 9 | 10 | 11 | 12 | 13 | 14 | 15 | 16 | 17 | 18 | 19 | 20 | 21 | 22 | 23 | 24 | 25 | 26 | 27 | 28 | 29 | 30 | 31 | 32 | 33 | 34 | 35 | 36 | 37 | 38 | 39 | 40 |
| Individual | 60 | 54 | 48 | 43 | 40 | 38 | 36 | 34 | 32 | 31 | 30 | 29 | 28 | 27 | 26 | 25 | 24 | 23 | 22 | 21 | 20 | 19 | 18 | 17 | 16 | 15 | 14 | 13 | 12 | 11 | 10 | 9 | 8 | 7 | 6 | 5 | 4 | 3 | 2 | 1 |
| Sprint | 60 | 54 | 48 | 43 | 40 | 38 | 36 | 34 | 32 | 31 | 30 | 29 | 28 | 27 | 26 | 25 | 24 | 23 | 22 | 21 | 20 | 19 | 18 | 17 | 16 | 15 | 14 | 13 | 12 | 11 | 10 | 9 | 8 | 7 | 6 | 5 | 4 | 3 | 2 | 1 |
| Pursuit | 60 | 54 | 48 | 43 | 40 | 38 | 36 | 34 | 32 | 31 | 30 | 29 | 28 | 27 | 26 | 25 | 24 | 23 | 22 | 21 | 20 | 19 | 18 | 17 | 16 | 15 | 14 | 13 | 12 | 11 | 10 | 9 | 8 | 7 | 6 | 5 | 4 | 3 | 2 | 1 |
| Mass Start | 60 | 54 | 48 | 43 | 40 | 38 | 36 | 34 | 32 | 31 | 30 | 29 | 28 | 27 | 26 | 25 | 24 | 23 | 22 | 21 | 20 | 18 | 16 | 14 | 12 | 10 | 8 | 6 | 4 | 2 |

== Achievements ==
First World Cup career victory

Men

- (Germany) Johannes Kühn (30), in his 9th season – Stage 3 Sprint in Hochfilzen
- (Norway) Sivert Guttorm Bakken (23), in his 2nd season – Stage 10 Mass Start in Oslo Holmenkollen

Women

- (Belarus) Hanna Sola (25), in her 5th season – Stage 3 Sprint in Hochfilzen
- (Sweden) Elvira Öberg (22), in her 3rd season – Stage 4 Pursuit in Annecy-Le Grand-Bornand

First World Cup podium

Men

- (Belarus) Anton Smolski (24), in his 5th season – Stage 3 Sprint in Hochfilzen – 3rd place
- (Norway) Filip Fjeld Andersen (22), in his 2nd season – Stage 4 Sprint in Annecy-Le Grand-Bornand – 3rd place
- (Russia) Said Karimulla Khalili (23), in his 3rd season – Stage 7 Individual in Antholz-Anterselva – 3rd place
- (Norway) Sivert Guttorm Bakken (23), in his 2nd season – Stage 9 Mass Start in Otepää – 3rd place

Women

- (Russia) Kristina Reztsova (25), in her 3rd season – Stage 4 Mass Start in Annecy-Le Grand-Bornand– 3rd place
- (Sweden) Mona Brorsson (31), in her 10th season – Stage 7 Individual in Antholz-Anterselva – 3rd place
- (Sweden) Stina Nilsson (28), in her 2nd season – Stage 8 Sprint in Kontiolahti – 3rd place
- (Germany) Vanessa Voigt (24), in her 2nd season – Stage 9 Sprint in Otepää – 2nd place

Number of wins this season (in brackets are all-time wins)

Men

- (France) Quentin Fillon Maillet – 8 (14)
- (Norway) Sturla Holm Lægreid – 2 (9)
- (Norway) Vetle Sjåstad Christiansen – 2 (3)
- (Sweden) Sebastian Samuelsson – 2 (3)
- (Norway) Johannes Thingnes Bø – 1 (52)
- (Russia) Alexandr Loginov – 1 (4)
- (France) Émilien Jacquelin – 1 (3)
- (Germany) Benedikt Doll – 1 (3)
- (Germany) Erik Lesser – 1 (3)
- (Russia) Anton Babikov – 1 (2)
- (Germany) Johannes Kühn – 1 (1)
- (Norway) Sivert Guttorm Bakken – 1 (1)

Women

- (Norway) Marte Olsbu Røiseland – 6 (15)
- (Sweden) Elvira Öberg – 4 (4)
- (Norway) Tiril Eckhoff – 3 (29)
- (France) Justine Braisaz-Bouchet – 2 (4)
- (Italy) Dorothea Wierer – 1 (13)
- (Germany) Denise Herrmann – 1 (8)
- (Sweden) Hanna Öberg – 1 (6)
- (France) Julia Simon – 1 (4)
- (Czech Republic) Markéta Davidová – 1 (3)
- (Austria) Lisa Theresa Hauser – 1 (3)
- (Belarus) Hanna Sola – 1 (1)

== Retirements ==
The following notable biathletes retired during or after the 2021–22 season:

Men

- (Austria) Julian Eberhard
- (Austria) Tobias Eberhard
- (Belgium) Tom Lahaye-Goffart
- (Belarus) Sergey Bocharnikov
- (Bulgaria) Dimitar Gerdzhikov
- (Canada) Scott Gow
- (Canada) Aidan Millar
- (Czech Republic) Tomáš Krupčík
- (Czech Republic) Milan Žemlička
- (Estonia) Kalev Ermits
- (France) Simon Desthieux
- (United Kingdom) Vinny Fountain
- (Germany) Erik Lesser
- (Italy) Thomas Bormolini
- (Italy) Dominik Windisch
- (Italy) Saverio Zini
- (Japan) Kazuki Baisho
- (Japan) Tsukasa Kobonoki
- (Japan) Kōsuke Ozaki
- (Kazakhstan) Maxim Braun
- (Latvia) Roberts Slotiņš
- (Norway) Håvard Bogetveit
- (South Korea) Kim Yong-gyu
- (Russia) Vadim Filimonov
- (Russia) Yuri Shopin
- (Slovakia) Šimon Bartko
- (Slovakia) Matej Baloga
- (Slovenia) Klemen Bauer
- (Serbia) Damir Rastić
- (Sweden) Torstein Stenersen
- (Switzerland) Eligius Tambornino
- (Switzerland) Benjamin Weger
- (Switzerland) Martin Jäger
- (Ukraine) Serhiy Semenov
- (United States) Maxwell Durtschi
- (United States) Leif Nordgren

Women

- (Australia) Jillian Colebourn
- (Austria) Christina Rieder
- (Canada) Megan Bankes
- (Canada) Sarah Beaudry
- (Canada) Darya Sepandj
- (China) Zhang Yan
- (Czech Republic) Eva Puskarčíková
- (Estonia) Kadri Lehtla
- (France) Anaïs Bescond
- (United Kingdom) Amanda Lightfoot
- (Germany) Franziska Hildebrand
- (Germany) Maren Hammerschmidt
- (Germany) Karolin Horchler
- (Italy) Irene Lardschneider
- (Japan) Sari Maeda
- (Japan) Kirari Tanaka
- (Japan) Yurie Tanaka
- (Norway) Hilde Fenne
- (Poland) Karolina Pitoń
- (South Korea) Mun Ji-hee
- (South Korea) Kim Seon-su
- (Romania) Ana Larisa Cotrus
- (Russia) Olga Moshenkova
- (Russia) Olga Podchufarova
- (Russia) Margarita Vasilyeva
- (Slovakia) Veronika Machyniaková
- (Slovenia) Nika Vindišar
- (Switzerland) Selina Gasparin
- (Sweden) Ingela Andersson
- (Sweden) Elisabeth Högberg
- (Ukraine) Olga Abramova
- (Ukraine) Yuliya Zhuravok
- (United States) Susan Dunklee
- (United States) Clare Egan
- (United States) Hallie Grossman
- (United States) Madeleine Phaneuf

== See also ==
- 2021–22 Biathlon IBU Cup
