= Sanita Buliņa =

Latvian biathlete (born 2001)

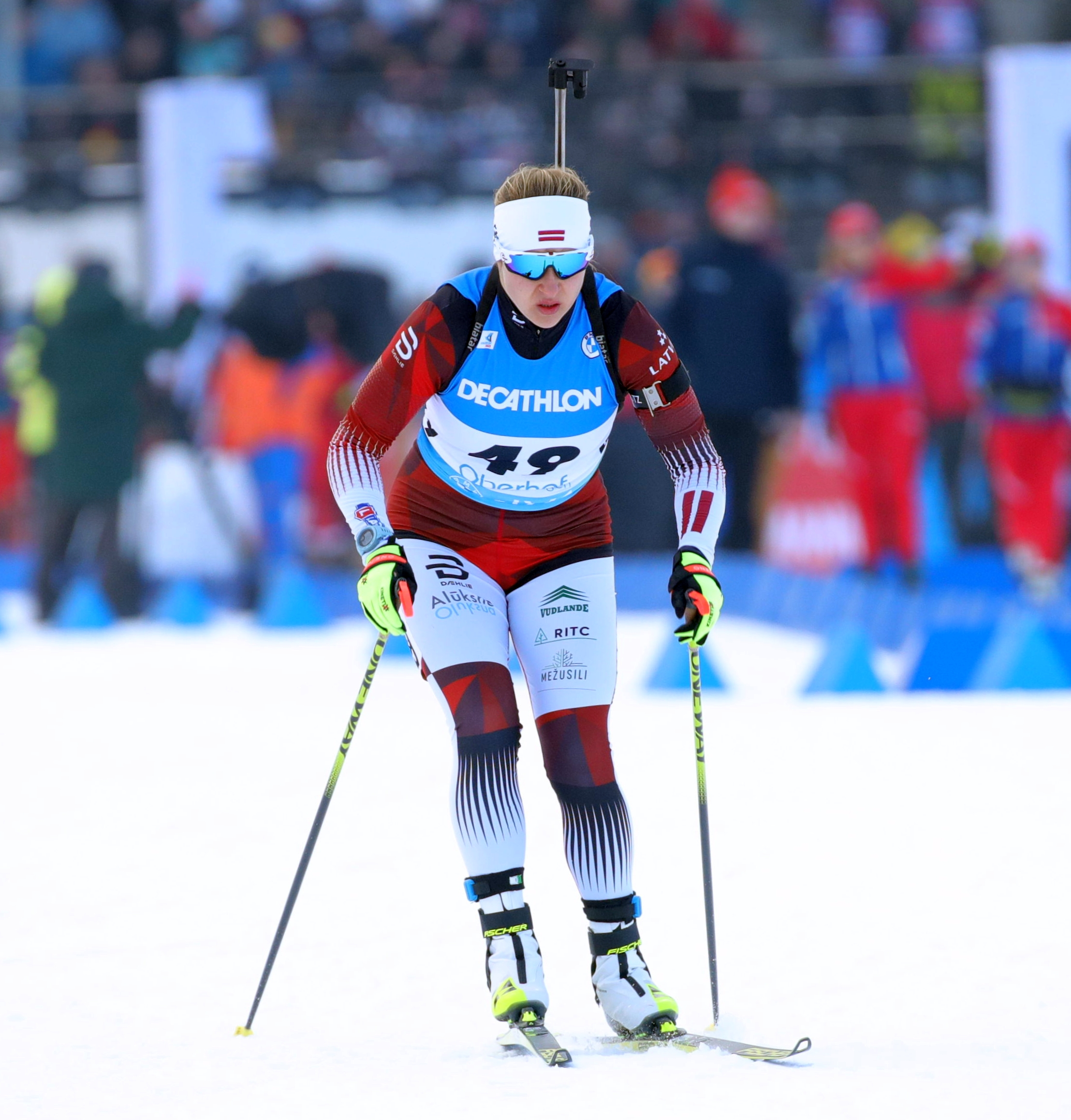
- Buliņa in 2023

Personal information
- Nationality: Latvian
- Born: 20 April 2001 (age 25) Alūksne, Latvia

Sport
- Country: Latvia
- Sport: Biathlon

Sanita Buliņa (born 4 April 2001) is a Latvian biathlete who has competed in the Biathlon World Cup since 2020.

== Career ==
Sanita Buliņa made her first appearances in international biathlon competitions at the 2018 Youth World Championships and also competed in the IBU Junior Cup during the following winter. In general, she had limited success at the junior level at first, with her best result being 18th place in the Junior Sprint at the 2019 Summer Biathlon World Championships. With the start of the 2019/20 season, the Latvian made her IBU Cup debut and participated throughout the entire winter, though she did not achieve any top-60 finishes. However, in January 2020, she made her debut at the World Championships in Antholz, competing at the highest level. In the 2020/21 season, Buliņa was part of the World Cup team from the start and immediately achieved a respectable 64th place in the sprint in Hochfilzen. After another World Championship appearance, where her best result was 67th in the individual event, the Latvian surprisingly finished 32nd in the sprint race in Östersund at the end of the season, outpacing athletes from the extended world elite, such as Emma Lunder and Yevgeniya Pavlova. This result was unexpected, as Buliņa had a slow shooting pace but hit all targets, which had only occasionally happened before. Motivated by this result, Buliņa won medals in all three events at the Youth Summer Biathlon World Championships in 2021, despite making several shooting mistakes. Before that, she had competed in two cross-country races on roller skis in her homeland, both times losing to Baiba Bendika.

At the beginning of the 2023/24 season, Buliņa earned World Cup points for the first time in nearly three years, finishing 33rd in the sprint and 30th in the pursuit in Östersund. However, due to poor shooting statistics, she was unable to repeat these results and was not nominated for the World Championships, except for the women's relay, and she did not impress at the European Championships either.

== Biathlon results ==
All results are sourced from the International Biathlon Union.

=== Olympic Games ===
Event	Individual	Sprint	Pursuit	Mass start	Relay	Mixed relay
(Italy) 2026 Milano Cortina	58th	38th	53rd	—	17th	—

=== World Championships ===
Event	Individual	Sprint	Pursuit	Mass start	Relay	Mixed relay	Single mixed relay
(Italy) 2020 Antholz-Anterselva	—	98th	—	—	23rd	—	—
(Slovenia) 2021 Pokljuka	67th	92nd	—	—	22nd	23rd	—
(Germany) 2023 Oberhof	—	71st	—	—	—	—	—
(Czech Republic) 2024 Nové Město	—	—	—	—	15th	—	—
(Switzerland) 2025 Lenzerheide	83rd	—	—	—	16th	—	—

=== World Cup ===
Season	Overall			Individual		Sprint		Pursuit		Mass start	
Season	Races	Points	Position	Points	Position	Points	Position	Points	Position	Points	Position
2019–20	1/21	Did not earn World Cup points									
2020–21	11/26	9	86th	—	—	9	79th	—	—	—	—
2021–22	9/22	Did not earn World Cup points									
2022–23	6/20	Did not earn World Cup points									
2023–24	8/21	19	78th	—	—	8	76th	11	66th	—	—

=== Youth and Junior World Championships ===
Year	Age	Individual	Sprint	Pursuit	Relay
(Estonia) 2018 Otepää	17	37th	49th	38th	11th
(Slovakia) 2019 Osrblie	18	39th	61st	—	17th
(Switzerland) 2020 Lenzerheide	19	64th	48th	53rd	18th
(Austria) 2021 Obertilliach	20	72nd	44th	48th	—
(United States) 2022 Soldier Hollow	21	52nd	44th	50th	—
