= Biathlon Junior World Championships 2018 =

Biathlon event in Estonia

2018 IBU Youth & Junior World Championships
- Host city: Otepää, Estonia
- Dates: 26 February – 4 March
- Main venue: Tehvandi Sports Center
- Participation: 37 nations
- Events: 16
- Website: otepaa.biathlon.ee

The 2018 Biathlon Junior World Championships was held in Otepää, Estonia from 26 February to 4 March 2018. There was a total of 16 competitions: sprint, pursuit, individual and relay races for men and women.

== Schedule ==
All times are local (UTC+2).

Date	Time	Event
26 February	11:00	Youth Women's 10 km individual
26 February	14:00	Youth Men's 12.5 km individual
27 February	12:05	Junior Women's 3 × 6 km relay
27 February	13:40	Junior Men's 4 × 7.5 km relay
28 February	13:05	Youth Women's 3 × 6 km relay
28 February	14:40	Youth Men's 3 × 7.5 km relay
1 March	12:00	Junior Women's 12.5 km individual
1 March	15:00	Junior Men's 15 km individual
2 March	11:00	Youth Women's 6 km sprint
2 March	14:00	Youth Men's 7.5 km sprint
3 March	11:00	Junior Women's 7.5 km sprint
3 March	14:00	Junior Men's 10 km sprint
4 March	11:00	Youth Women's 7.5 km pursuit
4 March	12:00	Youth Men's 10 km pursuit
4 March	14:15	Junior Women's 10 km pursuit
4 March	15:20	Junior Men's 12.5 km pursuit

== Medal winners ==
=== Junior events ===
==== Junior Men ====
Event	Gold		Silver		Bronze	
15 km Individual details	Igor Malinovsky; Russia	41:48.5 (1+1+1+0)	Sturla Holm Lægreid; Norway	42:07.9 (1+1+0+1)	Said Karimulla Khalili; Russia	42:11.5 (0+1+1+0)
10 km Sprint details	Vasily Tomshin; Russia	25:01.8 (0+0)	Martin Perrillat-Bottonet; France	25:22.3 (1+0)	Sverre Dahlen Aspenes; Norway	25:31.2 (0+2)
12.5 km Pursuit details	Sverre Dahlen Aspenes; Norway	34:16.7 (0+0+0+0)	Martin Perrillat-Bottonet; France	35:37.8 (0+0+1+0)	Johannes Dale; Norway	36:03.1 (0+0+2+2)
4 × 7.5 km Relay details	Russia; Said Karimulla Khalili; Vasily Tomshin; Vyacheslav Maleev; Igor Malinovsky	1:25:21.2 (0+0) (0+0) (0+2) (0+0) (0+2) (0+3) (0+0) (0+2)	Norway; Sivert Guttorm Bakken; Johannes Dale; Endre Strømsheim; Sturla Holm Lægreid	1:26:18.3 (0+3) (0+1) (3+3) (0+3) (0+1) (0+1) (0+1) (0+0)	France; Hugo Rivail; Emilien Claude; Morgan Lamure; Martin Perrillat-Bottonet	1:28:06.8 (0+2) (0+1) (0+1) (0+0) (0+1) (2+3) (0+1) (0+0)

==== Junior Women ====
Event	Gold		Silver		Bronze	
12.5 km Individual details	Kamila Żuk; Poland	41:36.1 (1+1+0+0)	Anna Kryvonos; Ukraine	44:40.8 (0+1+1+0)	Irina Kazakevich; Russia	44:56.1 (2+1+0+0)
7.5 km Sprint details	Kamila Żuk; Poland	22:32.5 (0+1)	Markéta Davidová; Czech Republic	22:58.5 (0+2)	Myrtille Bègue; France	23:24.5 (0+0)
10 km Pursuit details	Markéta Davidová; Czech Republic	32:52.6 (1+0+2+1)	Kamila Żuk; Poland	33:20.7 (1+2+3+0)	Myrtille Bègue; France	33:46.4 (0+1+1+1)
3 × 6 km Relay details	France; Camille Bened; Myrtille Bègue; Lou Jeanmonnot-Laurent	1:02:52.1 (0+1) (0+0) (0+2) (1+3) (0+0) (0+2)	Norway; Une Christiane Tronerud Kvelvane; Emilie Ågheim Kalkenberg; Kjersti Kvistad Dengerud	1:03:09.6 (1+3) (1+3) (0+1) (0+3) (0+0) (0+1)	Russia; Polina Shevnina; Emma Timerbulatova; Valeria Vasnetcova	1:03:32.2 (0+3) (0+3) (0+2) (0+1) (0+1) (2+3)

=== Youth events ===
==== Youth Men ====
Event	Gold		Silver		Bronze	
12.5 km Individual details	Mikhail Pervushin; Russia	37:41.2 (0+0+0+1)	Filip Fjeld Andersen; Norway	37:53.5 (1+0+0+0)	Martin Bourgeois République; France	38:28.4 (0+1+0+1)
7.5 km Sprint details	Mikhail Pervushin; Russia	20:17.3 (0+0)	Tommaso Giacomel; Italy	20:39.2 (0+0)	Vítězslav Hornig; Czech Republic	20:55.9 (0+1)
10 km Pursuit details	Andrei Viukhin; Russia	29:31.2 (1+1+1+1)	Mikhail Pervushin; Russia	29:48.0 (1+0+2+1)	Aleksei Ogorelkov; Russia	30:43.3 (0+0+0+2)
3 × 7.5 km Relay details	Russia; Denis Tashtimerov; Andrei Viukhin; Mikhail Pervushin	1:04:51.1 (0+0) (0+2) (1+3) (1+3) (0+0) (0+0)	Czech Republic; Vítězslav Hornig; Tomáš Mikyska; Mikuláš Karlík	1:07:21.1 (0+2) (0+0) (0+0) (0+1) (0+1) (0+3)	Norway; Eirik Silsand Gerhardsen; Martin Alfheim; Filip Fjeld Andersen	1:07:55.6 (0+1) (0+1) (0+1) (1+3) (0+2) (1+3)

==== Youth Women ====
Event	Gold		Silver		Bronze	
10 km Individual details	Elvira Öberg; Sweden	35:35.9 (1+0+0+0)	Anastasia Shevchenko; Russia	36:11.5 (1+0+0+1)	Anastasia Goreeva; Russia	36:29.7 (1+2+0+0)
6 km Sprint details	Elvira Öberg; Sweden	19:46.7 (0+1)	Heidi Nikkinen; Finland	19:59.8 (1+0)	Amanda Lundström; Sweden	20:03.4 (0+0)
7.5 km Pursuit details	Anastasia Goreeva; Russia	24:24.0 (0+0+1+2)	Franziska Pfnür; Germany	24:41.5 (0+1+0+0)	Amy Baserga; Switzerland	24:53.0 (0+0+1+1)
3 × 6 km Relay details	Sweden; Amanda Lundström; Ella Halvarsson; Elvira Öberg	1:03:19.8 (0+0) (0+3) (0+0) (0+3) (0+0) (0+0)	Finland; Jenni Keränen; Noora Kaisa Keränen; Heidi Nikkinen	1:03:19.8 (0+1) (0+1) (0+2) (1+3) (0+0) (1+3)	Norway; Marthe Kråkstad Johansen; Sigrid Bredde Vig; Juni Arnekleiv	1:03:56.8 (0+0) (0+2) (1+3) (0+0) (0+0) (1+3)

== Medal table ==
Rank	Nation	Gold	Silver	Bronze	Total
1	Russia (RUS)	8	2	5	15
2	Sweden (SWE)	3	0	1	4
3	Poland (POL)	2	1	0	3
4	Norway (NOR)	1	4	4	9
5	France (FRA)	1	2	4	7
6	Czech Republic (CZE)	1	2	1	4
7	Finland (FIN)	0	2	0	2
8	Germany (GER)	0	1	0	1
8	Italy (ITA)	0	1	0	1
8	Ukraine (UKR)	0	1	0	1
11	Switzerland (SUI)	0	0	1	1
Totals (11 entries)		16	16	16	48
