= Maria Zdravkova =

Bulgarian biathlete (born 1998)

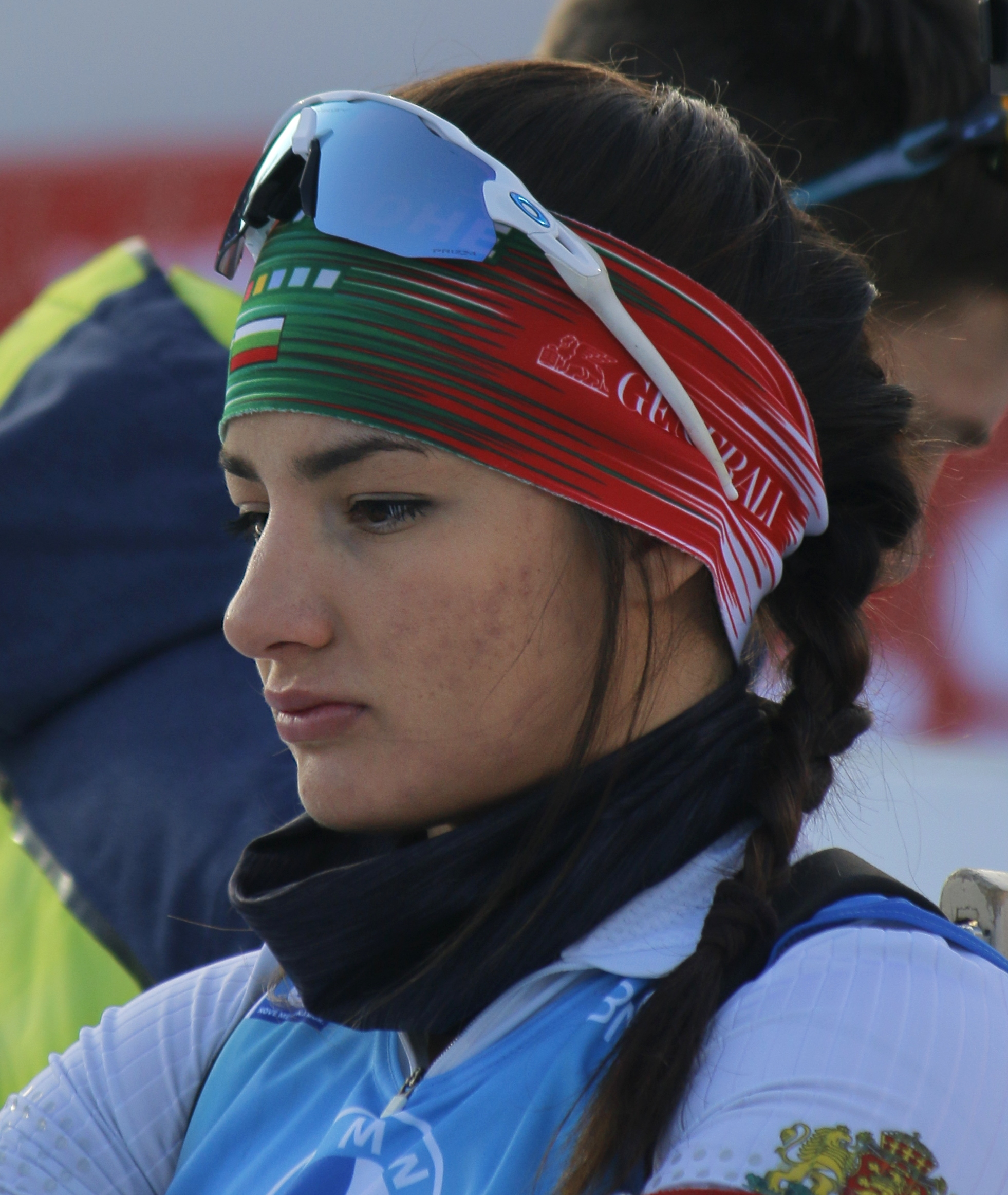
- Zdravkova in 2023

Personal information
- Born: 30 July 1998 (age 27) Berkovitsa, Bulgaria

Sport
- Country: Bulgaria
- Sport: Biathlon
- Club: Ambarica Troyan

Maria Zdravkova (Bulgarian: Мария Здравкова, born 30 July 1998) is a Bulgarian biathlete. She competed in the 2022 Winter Olympics.

== Career ==
Zdravkova started biathlon in 2010. She debuted at the IBU Cup in 2016 before debuting at the Biathlon World Cup in 2019. She was named as the female flag bearer for Bulgaria at the 2022 Winter Olympics. She competed in multiple biathlon events at the 2022 Winter Olympics. She was part of the Bulgarian team in the mixed relay, placing 19th out of 20 teams. She placed 50th in the individual event, 78th in the sprint, and 18th with the Bulgarian team in the women's relay.

== Biathlon results ==
All results are sourced from the International Biathlon Union.

=== Olympic Games ===
0 medals

Event	Individual	Sprint	Pursuit	Mass start	Relay	Mixed relay
(China) 2022 Beijing	50th	78th	—	—	18th	19th
(Italy) 2026 Milano-Cortina	76th	83rd	—	—	12th	—

=== World Championships ===
0 medals

Event	Individual	Sprint	Pursuit	Mass start	Relay	Mixed relay	Single mixed relay
(Italy) 2020 Rasen-Antholz	—	85th	—	—	20th	24th	25th
(Slovenia) 2021 Pokljuka	78th	97th	—	—	18th	—	—
(Germany) 2023 Oberhof	90th	—	—	—	—	—	—
(Czech Republic) 2024 Nové Město na Moravě	70th	88th	—	—	16th	—	—
(Switzerland) 2025 Lenzerheide	90th	—	—	—	21st	—	—

*During Olympic seasons competitions are only held for those events not included in the Olympic program.
