= Anastasiia Goreeva =

Russian biathlete

Personal information
- Native name: Анастасия Алексеевна Гореева
- Nationality: Russian
- Born: 27 August 1999 (age 26) Pavlovsky Posad, Moscow Oblast, Russia
- Height: 1.72 m (5 ft 8 in)
- Weight: 60 kg (132 lb)

Sport

Professional information
- Sport: Biathlon
- World Cup debut: 28 November 2020

World Cup
- Seasons: 1 (2020/21)
- Individual races: 4
- All races: 4
Medal record
Women's biathlon
Representing Russia
Junior World Championships
Silver medal – second place	2020 Lenzerheide	4 × 6 km relay
Youth World Championships
Gold medal – first place	2017 Osrblie	3 x 6 km relay
Gold medal – first place	2018 Otepää	7.5 km pursuit
Bronze medal – third place	2018 Otepää	10 km individual
- Updated on 15 January 2021

Anastasiia Alekseyevna Goreeva (Russian: Анастасия Алексеевна Гореева; born 27 August 1999) is a Russian biathlete.

== Career ==
Goreeva has been engaged in biathlon since 2007.

Anastasiia made her international debut at the 2017 Junior World Championships in Osrblie. As part of the Russian national team, she became the world champion in the youth women's relay. She also finished 13th in the individual race, 12th in the sprint and 8th in the pursuit. She improved her results at the next 2018 Junior World Championships in Otepää, finishing 3rd in the individual race, 4th in the sprint and becoming the champion in the pursuit.

Goreeva made her World Cup debut in the first race of the 2020-21 season in Kontiolahti, finishing 56th with four penalties.

== Biathlon results ==
=== Junior/Youth World Championships ===
4 medals (2 gold, 1 silver, 1 bronze)

Event	Individual	Sprint	Pursuit	Relay
(Slovakia) 2017 Osrblie	13th	12th	8th	Gold
(Estonia) 2018 Otepää	Bronze	4th	Gold	4th
(Switzerland) 2020 Lenzerheide	18th	10th	–	Silver
