= Markéta Davidová =

Czech biathlete (born 1997)

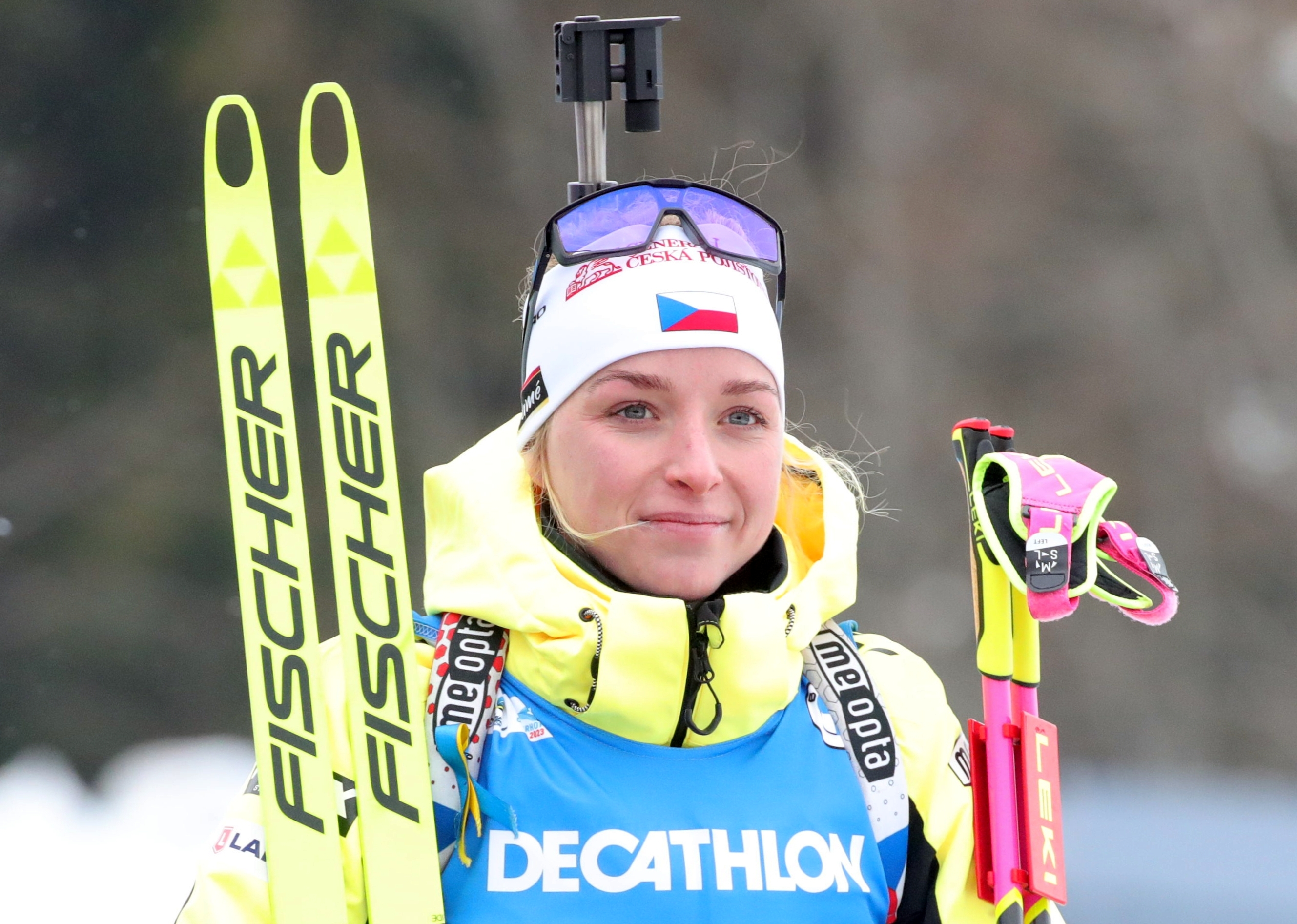
- Davidová in 2023

Personal information
- Nationality: Czech
- Born: 3 January 1997 (age 29) Jablonec nad Nisou, Czech Republic
- Height: 1.68 m (5 ft 6 in)
- Weight: 56 kg (123 lb)

Sport

Professional information
- Sport: Biathlon
- Club: SKP Kornspitz Jablonec
- World Cup debut: 2016

Olympic Games
- Teams: 2 (2018)(2022)
- Medals: 0 (0 gold)

World Championships
- Teams: 2 (2020, 2021)
- Medals: 2 (1 gold)

World Cup
- Seasons: 5 (2016/17–)
- Individual victories: 4
- Individual podiums: 12
- All podiums: 14
- Discipline titles: 1 Individual (2021-22)
Medal record
Women's biathlon
Representing Czech Republic
World Championships
Gold medal – first place	2021 Pokljuka	15 km individual
Bronze medal – third place	2020 Antholz	Mixed relay
Junior World Championships
Gold medal – first place	2018 Otepää	10 km pursuit
Silver medal – second place	2018 Otepää	7.5 km sprint
Youth World Championships
Silver medal – second place	2016 Cheile Grădiştei	3 × 6 km relay
Bronze medal – third place	2016 Cheile Grădiştei	10 km individual

Markéta Davidová (born 3 January 1997) is a Czech biathlete. She competed in the 2018 and 2022 Winter Olympics.

== Biathlon results ==
All results are sourced from the International Biathlon Union.

=== Olympic Games ===
0 medals

Event	Individual	Sprint	Pursuit	Mass start	Relay	Mixed relay
(South Korea) 2018 Pyeongchang	57th	15th	25th	18th	12th	8th
(China) 2022 Beijing	6th	41st	28th	4th	8th	12th
(Italy) 2026 Milano Cortina	—	81st	—	—	—	11th

=== World Championships ===
2 medals (1 gold, 1 bronze)

Event	Individual	Sprint	Pursuit	Mass start	Relay	Mixed relay	Single mixed relay
(Sweden) 2019 Östersund	43rd	7th	13th	16th	15th	6th	—
(Italy) 2020 Antholz-Anterselva	8th	37th	25th	20th	4th	Bronze	14th
(Slovenia) 2021 Pokljuka	Gold	44th	32nd	13th	10th	11th	—
(Germany) 2023 Oberhof	10th	6th	16th	5th	7th	5th	—
(Czech Republic) 2024 Nové Město na Moravě	20th	17th	9th	15th	7th	14th	10th

*During Olympic seasons competitions are only held for those events not included in the Olympic program.
**The single mixed relay was added as an event in 2019.

=== Junior World Championships ===
Event	Individual	Sprint	Pursuit	Relay
(Belarus) 2015 Minsk	—	—	—	10th
(Slovakia) 2017 Osrblie	43rd	14th	18th	11th
(Estonia) 2018 Otepää	14th	Silver	Gold	—

=== World Cup ===
Season	Age	Overall			Sprint			Pursuit			Individual			Mass start		
Season	Age	Races	Points	Position	Races	Points	Position	Races	Points	Position	Races	Points	Position	Races	Points	Position
2016/17	20	3/26	13	91st	2/9	13	71st	1/9	0	—	0/3	0	—	0/5	0	—
2017/18	21	7/22	8	91st	4/8	6	84th	3/7	2	82nd	0/2	0	—	0/5	0	—
2018/19	22	21/25	428	21st	9/9	136	24th	6/8	84	32nd	3/3	102	3rd	3/5	106	16th
2019/20	23	20/21	478	14th	8/8	212	8th	4/5	80	22nd	3/3	66	14th	5/5	120	16th
2020/21	24	25/26	649	11th	10/10	224	11th	7/8	163	14th	3/3	80	5th	5/5	142	9th
2021/22	25	21/22	560	10th	9/9	176	17th	6/7	170	10th	2/2	98	1st	4/4	116	7th
2022/23	26	20/20	668	9th	7/7	245	5th	7/7	230	7th	3/3	87	10th	4/4	106	13th
2023/24	27	21/22	361	18th	7/7	73	28th	6/6	160	14th	3/3	45	23rd	4/4	83	18th
2024/25	28	6/21	223	33rd	3/3	131	17th	1/1	50	39th	1/1	11	53rd	1/1	31	37th
2025/26	29	10/21	145	42nd	4/4	75	33rd	4/4	68	36th	1/1	—	—	1/1	2	55th

=== Individual podiums ===
- 4 victories (2 individual, 2 sprint)
- 12 podiums

No.	Season	Date	Location	Discipline	Level	Place
1	2018-19	6 December 2018	(Slovenia) Pokljuka	15 km Individual	World Cup	3rd
2	2018-19	24 January 2019	(Italy) Antholz	7.5 km Sprint	World Cup	1st
3	2018-19	27 January 2019	(Italy) Antholz	12.5 km Mass Start	World Cup	2nd
4	2018-19	7 February 2019	(Canada) Canmore	12.5 km Short Individual	World Cup	2nd
5	2019-20	1 December 2019	(Sweden) Östersund	7.5 km Sprint	World Cup	3rd
6	2019-20	20 December 2019	(France) Annecy	7.5 km Sprint	World Cup	3rd
7	2019-20	5 March 2020	(Czech Republic) Nové Město	7.5 km Sprint	World Cup	3rd
8	2020-21	16 February 2021	(Slovenia) Pokljuka	15 km Individual	World Championships	1st
9	2021-22	27 November 2021	(Sweden) Östersund	15 km Individual	World Cup	1st
10	2022-23	8 December 2022	(Austria) Hochfilzen	7.5 km Sprint	World Cup	2nd
11	2022-23	10 December 2022	(Austria) Hochfilzen	10 km Pursuit	World Cup	3rd
12	2024-25	7 December 2024	(Finland) Kontiolahti	7.5 km Sprint	World Cup	1st
