= Kamila Żuk =

Polish biathlete (born 1997)

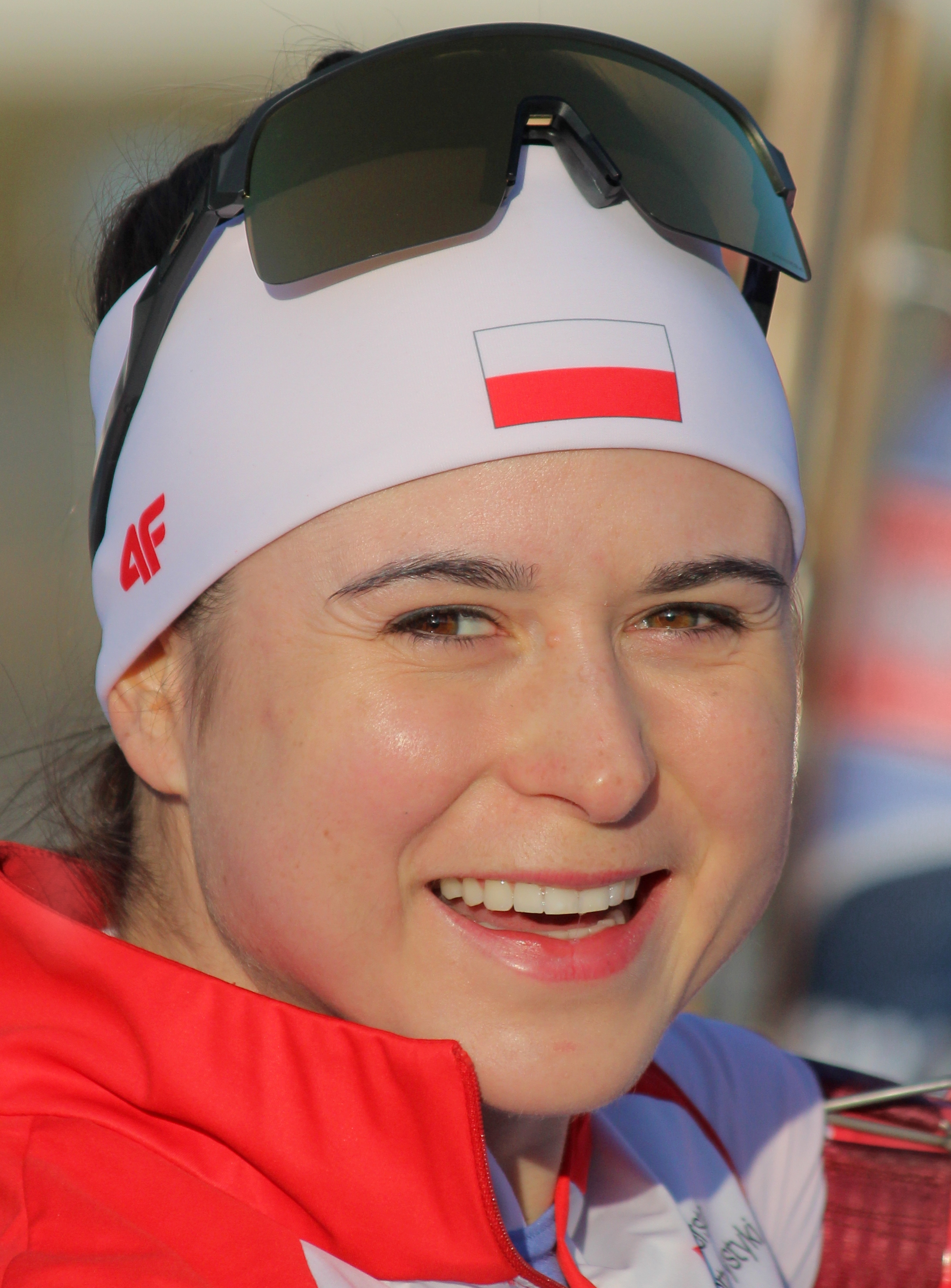
- Żuk in 2023

Personal information
- Born: 18 November 1997 (age 28) Wałbrzych, Poland

Sport

Professional information
- Sport: Biathlon
- Club: AZS-AWF Katowice
- World Cup debut: 2017

Olympic Games
- Teams: 3
Medal record
Women's biathlon
Representing Poland
European Championships
Gold medal – first place	2021 Duszniki-Zdrój	Pursuit
Junior World Championships
Gold medal – first place	2018 Otepää	12.5 km individual
Gold medal – first place	2018 Otepää	7.5 km sprint
Silver medal – second place	2018 Otepää	10 km pursuit
Silver medal – second place	2019 Osrblie	7.5 km sprint
Junior European Championships
Bronze medal – third place	2017 Nové Město	sprint

Kamila Żuk (born 18 November 1997) is a Polish biathlete. She is a two-time gold and silver medallist at the Junior World Championships. She won a gold medal at the 2021 European Championships and has represented Poland at the Winter Olympic Games on three occasions (2018, 2022, 2026).

== Career ==
Żuk debuted at 2018 Olympic Games in PyeongChang in 2x6km Women + 2x7.5 km Men mixed relay and finished on 16th place.

On 1 March 2018, as the first Polish biathlete, she won the title of Junior World Champion in the 12,5 km individual competition with a winning time more than 3 minutes ahead of the 2nd place Biathlete. Two days later, she claimed another gold medal, this time in 7.5 km sprint ahead of Czech Markéta Davidová and French Myrtille Bègue. On 4 March 2018, Żuk added silver medal to her achievements from 2018 Junior World Championships in 10 km pursuit, losing only to Czech Davidová at a loss 28.1 sec.

== Results ==
=== Olympic Games ===
0 medals

Event	Individual	Sprint	Pursuit	Mass start	Relay	Mixed relay
(South Korea) 2018 Pyeongchang	—	—	—	—	—	16th
(China) 2022 Beijing	36th	53rd	DNS	—	14th	—
(Italy) 2026 Milano Cortina	43rd	8th	12th	30th	6th	9th

=== World Championships ===
0 medals

Event	Individual	Sprint	Pursuit	Mass start	Relay	Mixed relay	Single mixed relay
(Sweden) 2019 Östersund	48th	46th	36th	—	7th	—	—
(Italy) 2020 Antholz	84th	58th	DNS	—	7th	17th	18th
(Slovenia) 2021 Pokljuka	59th	29th	47th	—	6th	24th	26th
(Germany) 2023 Oberhof	50th	56th	52nd	—	9th	22nd	—
(Switzerland) 2025 Lenzerheide	59th	68th	—	—	9th	14th	—

=== Youth/Junior World Championships ===
Event	Individual	Sprint	Pursuit	Relay
(Belarus) 2015 Raubichi-Minsk	50th	13th	58th	9th
(Romania) 2016 Cheile Grădiştei	28th	11th	29th	5th
(Slovakia) 2017 Osrblie	49th	27th	10th	10th
(Estonia) 2018 Otepää	Gold	Gold	Silver	5th

=== Youth/Junior European Championships ===
Event	Individual	Sprint	Pursuit	Relay
(Slovenia) 2016 Pokljuka	37th	6th	8th	—
(Czech Republic) 2017 Nové Město	8th	Bronze	12th	—
