= Eva Puskarčíková =

Czech biathlete (born 1991)

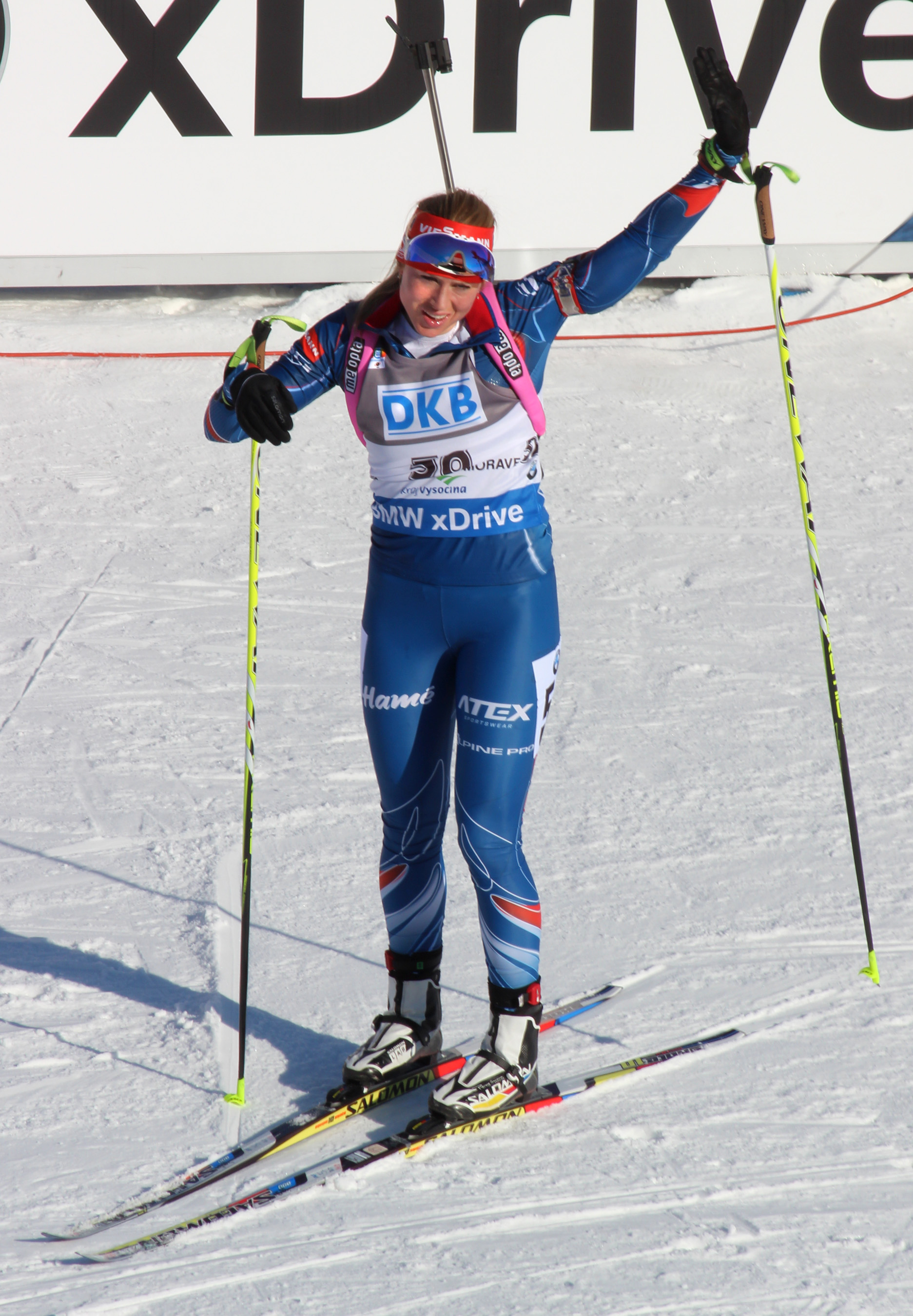
- Puskarčíková in 2015

Personal information
- Born: 3 January 1991 (age 35) Jilemnice, Czechoslovakia
- Height: 1.68 m (5 ft 6 in)
- Weight: 57 kg (126 lb)

Sport

Professional information
- Club: SKP Jablonec

World Championships
- Teams: 1 (2020)
- Medals: 1 (0 gold)
Medal record
Women's biathlon
Representing Czech Republic
Olympic Games
Bronze medal – third place	2014 Sochi	4 x 6 km relay
World Championships
Bronze medal – third place	2020 Antholz	Mixed relay
European Championships
Silver medal – second place	2013 Bansko	4 x 6 km relay
Winter Universiade
Silver medal – second place	2015 Osrblie	Mass start
- Updated on 13 February 2020

Eva Puskarčíková (Czech pronunciation: [ˈɛva ˈpuskartʃiːkovaː], born 3 January 1991) is a former Czech biathlete.

== Career ==
Her best result in the Biathlon World Cup is 3rd place in the pursuit in the 2016–17 season. She competed at the 2014 Winter Olympics in Sochi. Her best result here was 3rd place in relay, shared with her Czech teammates Gabriela Soukalová, Jitka Landová and Veronika Vítková. Apart from that, she also competed in sprint, pursuit and individual. On the 17th of March 2022, Puskarčíková announced the end of her career on her social media.

== Record ==
=== Olympic Games ===
1 medals (1 bronze)

Event	Individual	Sprint	Pursuit	Mass Start	Relay	Mixed Relay
(Russia) 2014 Sochi	22nd	45th	42nd	—	Bronze	—
(South Korea) 2018 Pyeongchang	44th	43rd	32nd	—	12th	—
(China) 2022 Beijing	—	—	—	—	8th	—

=== World Championships ===
1 medal (1 bronze)

Event	Individual	Sprint	Pursuit	Mass start	Relay	Mixed relay	Single mixed relay
(Finland) 2015 Kontiolahti	24th	73rd	—	—	7th	—	—N/a
(Austria) 2017 Hochfilzen	23rd	17th	31st	26th	4th	7th	—N/a
(Sweden) 2019 Östersund	42nd	59th	41st	—	15th	—	9th
(Italy) 2020 Antholz-Anterselva	10th	24th	44th	23rd	4th	Bronze	—
(Slovenia) 2021 Pokljuka	37th	68th	—	—	10th	—	—

== Personal life ==
In 2019–2020, she was married to former Czech biathlete Lukáš Kristejn and competed under name Eva Kristejn Puskarčíková.

On 8 January 2024, Puskarčíková with her partner Thomas Bormolini announced her pregnancy in a post on Instagram.

On 7 July 2026, Puskarčíková announced her second pregnancy with the same partner in a post on Instagram.
