= 2024–25 Biathlon World Cup – Stage 5 =

2024–25 Biathlon World Cup Stage

The 2024–25 Biathlon World Cup – Stage 5 was the fifth event of the season and was held in Ruhpolding, Germany, from 13 to 19 January 2025. The event consisted of two individual competitions and two relay races, one by men and one by women. The World Cup leaders after the events in Ruhpolding were Johannes Thingnes Bø for the men and Franziska Preuß for the women. The U-23 World Cup ranking leaders after the events in Ruhpolding were Campbell Wright for the men and Jeanne Richard for the women.

== Stage overview ==
In the Norwegian women's team, Ingrid Landmark Tandrevold will miss the stage, and she will be replaced by Ragnhild Femsteinevik. In the men's team, Johannes Dale-Skjevdal has returned and will compete in the individual race, as Martin Uldal fell ill and will miss the race. It is also expected that Vetle Sjåstad Christiansen will compete in the mass start race at this stage.

In the German women's team, Stefanie Scherer will be replaced by Julia Kink. In the men's team, Roman Rees and David Zobel will take the places of Philipp Horn and Simon Kaiser. In the Italian men's team, Daniele Cappellari will replace Marco Barale. In the women's team, Rebecca Passler will take over for Ilaria Scattolo. In the Swedish men's team, Emil Nykvist has been called up to replace the ill Anton Ivarsson. Paulína Bátovská Fialková is returning to the Slovak national team after missing the stage in Oberhof due to her training program. Julia Tannheimer and Vanessa Voigt were forced to end their participation in the stage after the individual race due to feeling unwell.

Vebjørn Sørum and Tommaso Giacomel claimed the first individual victories of their careers at this stage. For the first time, Émilien Claude, Amy Baserga, and Jeanne Richard stepped onto the individual podium. Émilien Claude and Stefanie Scherer also secured victories in the relay races, debuting in these events as part of the World Cup program.

== Medal winners ==
=== Men ===
Event:	Gold:	Time	Silver:	Time	Bronze:	Time
20 km Individual	Vebjørn Sørum; Norway	47:30.0 (0+0+0+0)	Émilien Claude; France	48:22.1 (0+0+0+0)	Andrejs Rastorgujevs; Latvia	48:26.8 (0+1+0+0)
4 x 7.5 km Men Relay	France; Émilien Claude; Fabien Claude; Quentin Fillon Maillet; Émilien Jacquelin	1:08:45.4 (0+0) (0+1) (0+1) (0+1) (0+1) (0+0) (0+1) (0+1)	Sweden; Viktor Brandt; Jesper Nelin; Martin Ponsiluoma; Sebastian Samuelsson	1:09:23.8 (0+1) (0+1) (0+3) (0+2) (0+1) (0+1) (0+1) (0+0)	Germany; Justus Strelow; Danilo Riethmüller; Johannes Kühn; Philipp Nawrath	1:09:44.2 (0+1) (0+1) (0+1) (0+3) (0+1) (0+3) (0+2) (0+2)
15 km Mass Start	Tommaso Giacomel; Italy	36:21.8 (0+0+0+0)	Sturla Holm Lægreid; Norway	+6.3 (1+0+0+0)	Johannes Thingnes Bø; Norway	+11.4 (1+0+0+1)

=== Women ===
Event:	Gold:	Time	Silver:	Time	Bronze:	Time
15 km Individual	Lou Jeanmonnot; France	41:35.5 (0+0+0+0)	Franziska Preuß; Germany	42:11.2 (0+1+0+0)	Amy Baserga; Switzerland	42:18.6 (0+0+0+0)
4 x 6 km Women Relay	Germany; Stefanie Scherer; Selina Grotian; Sophia Schneider; Franziska Preuß	1:07:47.6 (0+1) (0+0) (0+1) (0+0) (0+2) (0+0) (0+0) (0+0)	Norway; Karoline Offigstad Knotten; Juni Arnekleiv; Maren Kirkeeide; Ragnhild Femsteinevik	1:08:05.0 (0+1) (0+1) (0+0) (0+1) (0+1) (0+2) (0+2) (0+2)	France; Paula Botet; Océane Michelon; Justine Braisaz-Bouchet; Julia Simon	1:08:13.4 (1+3) (0+0) (0+1) (0+1) (0+1) (0+0) (0+1) (0+0)
12.5 km Mass Start	Elvira Öberg; Sweden	33:00.5 (0+0+0+0)	Franziska Preuß; Germany	+25.0 (0+1+0+0)	Jeanne Richard; France	+25.4 (0+0+0+0)

== Achievements ==
Best individual performance for all time

Men

- (Norway) Vebjørn Sørum (26), reached No. 1 on individual race
- (Italy) Tommaso Giacomel (24), reached No. 1 on mass start race
- (France) Émilien Claude (25), reached No. 2 on individual race
- (Czech Republic) Vítězslav Hornig (25), reached No. 5 on individual race
- (Finland) Otto Invenius (24), reached No. 7 on individual race
- (Austria) David Komatz (33), reached No. 9 on individual race
- (Slovakia) Artur Iskhakov (21), reached No. 65 on individual race
- (Denmark) Rasmus Schiellerup (23), reached No. 84 on individual race
- (Finland) Jumi Klemettinen (19), reached No. 87 on individual race
- (Poland) Fabian Suchodolski (20), reached No. 88 on individual race

Women

- (Switzerland) Amy Baserga (24), reached No. 3 on individual race
- (France) Jeanne Richard (22), reached No. 3 on mass start race
- (Estonia) Susan Külm (28), reached No. 12 on individual race
- (Germany) Stefanie Scherer (28), reached No. 23 on individual race
- (Latvia) Estere Volfa (19), reached No. 54 on individual race

First World Cup individual race

Men

- (Slovakia) Artur Iskhakov (21), reached No. 65 on individual race
- (Finland) Jumi Klemettinen (19), reached No. 87 on individual race

Women
