= 2024–25 Biathlon World Cup – Stage 7 =

2024–25 Biathlon World Cup Stage

The 2024–25 Biathlon World Cup – Stage 7 was the seventh event of the season and was held in Nové Město na Moravě, Czech Republic, from 6 to 9 March 2025. The event consisted of two individual competitions and two relay races, one by men and one by women.

== Stage overview ==
Elvira Öberg will miss the stage due to illness. She will be replaced by Sara Andersson in the Swedish women's team. After recovering from illness, Anna Gandler and Felix Leitner return to the Austrian team. In the German women's team, in addition to the squad that competed at the World Championships, Marlene Fichtner has also been invited.

In the Czech team, after a long illness, Markéta Davidová has returned to the squad, but it is still uncertain whether she will participate in the races at the start of the stage.

For the Italian team, Linda Zingerle and Patrick Braunhofer have been invited to complete the full quota. Arnaud Du Pasquier will debut for the Swiss team. In the Finnish team, Heikki Laitinen and Noora Kaisa Keränen have been added to the main squad. In the Ukrainian women's team, Oleksandra Merkushyna will compete instead of Anastasiya Merkushyna.

== Schedule of events ==
The events took place at the following times.

Date	Time	Events
6 March	18:40 CET	Men's 10 km Sprint
7 March	18:25 CET	Women's 7.5 km Sprint
8 March	14:55 CET	Men's 12.5 km Pursuit
8 March	17:40 CET	Women's 10 km Pursuit
9 March	13:50 CET	4 x 7.5 km Men Relay
9 March	16:45 CET	4 x 5 km Women Relay

== Medal winners ==
=== Men ===
Event:	Gold:	Time	Silver:	Time	Bronze:	Time
10 km Sprint details	Émilien Jacquelin; France	23:13.3 (0+0)	Tommaso Giacomel; Italy	23:33.1 (1+0)	Johannes Thingnes Bø; Norway	23:34.2 (2+0)
12.5 km Pursuit details	Sebastian Samuelsson; Sweden	32:22.1 (0+0+0+0)	Tommaso Giacomel; Italy	+26.4 (1+1+0+0)	Johannes Thingnes Bø; Norway	+38.7 (0+1+1+1)
4 x 7.5 km Relay details	France; Émilien Claude; Oscar Lombardot; Fabien Claude; Quentin Fillon Maillet	1:16:24.3 (0+1) (0+2) (0+0) (0+0) (0+0) (0+1) (0+0) (0+0)	Norway; Martin Uldal; Tarjei Bø; Sturla Holm Lægreid; Johannes Thingnes Bø	1:17:50.9 (0+1) (0+0) (0+0) (0+2) (0+2) (0+0) (0+0) (1+3)	Ukraine; Artem Tyshchenko; Vitalii Mandzyn; Anton Dudchenko; Dmytro Pidruchnyi	1:19:09.7 (0+0) (0+2) (0+2) (0+1) (0+0) (0+0) (0+1) (0+1)

=== Women ===
Event:	Gold:	Time	Silver:	Time	Bronze:	Time
7.5 km Sprint details	Ingrid Landmark Tandrevold; Norway	19:13.5 (0+0)	Justine Braisaz-Bouchet; France	19:28.6 (0+1)	Julia Simon; France	19:34.4 (0+0)
10 km Pursuit details	Julia Simon; France	30:56.0 (0+1+0+0)	Hanna Öberg; Sweden	+17.2 (0+1+0+1)	Océane Michelon; France	+19.2 (1+0+0+1)
4 x 5 km Relay details	France; Lou Jeanmonnot; Océane Michelon; Justine Braisaz-Bouchet; Julia Simon	1:11:11.1 (0+0) (0+0) (0+0) (0+0) (0+3) (0+1) (0+1) (0+0)	Norway; Karoline Offigstad Knotten; Ingrid Landmark Tandrevold; Ragnhild Femsteinevik; Maren Kirkeeide	1:11:36.2 (0+3) (0+2) (0+1) (0+1) (0+1) (0+1) (0+0) (0+2)	Germany; Johanna Puff; Julia Tannheimer; Sophia Schneider; Selina Grotian	1:11:58.7 (0+1) (0+0) (0+0) (0+1) (0+3) (0+1) (0+2) (0+0)

== Achievements ==
Best individual performance for all time

Men

- (France) Oscar Lombardot (24) reached No. 10 on pursuit race
- (Switzerland) Arnaud Du Pasquier (32) reached No. 67 on sprint race
- (Lithuania) Nikita Čigak (22) reached No. 74 on sprint race
- (Bulgaria) Vasil Zashev (22) reached No. 83 on sprint race
- (Estonia) Rasmus Tiislär (20) reached No. 90 on sprint race
- (Latvia) Matiss Meirans (19) reached No. 92 on sprint race

Women

- (Latvia) Estere Volfa (19) reached No. 34 on pursuit race
- (Poland) Anna Nędza-Kubiniec (21) reached No. 80 on sprint race
- (Italy) Linda Zingerle (22) reached No. 81 on sprint race
- (Estonia) Violetta Konopljova (21) reached No. 101 on sprint race

First World Cup individual race

Men

- (Switzerland) Arnaud Du Pasquier (32) reached No. 67 on sprint race
- (Estonia) Rasmus Tiislär (20) reached No. 90 on sprint race
- (Latvia) Matiss Meirans (19) reached No. 92 on sprint race

Women

- (Poland) Anna Nędza-Kubiniec (21) reached No. 80 on sprint race
- (Estonia) Violetta Konopljova (21) reached No. 101 on sprint race
