= 2024–25 Biathlon World Cup – Stage 4 =

2024–25 Biathlon World Cup Stage

The 2024–25 Biathlon World Cup – Stage 4 was the fourth event of the season and was held in Oberhof, Germany, from 6 to 12 January 2025. The event consisted of two individual competitions and two mixed relay races. The World Cup leaders after the events in Oberhof were Johannes Thingnes Bø for the men and Franziska Preuß for the women. The U-23 World Cup ranking leaders after the events in Oberhof were Campbell Wright for the men and Jeanne Richard for the women.

== Stage overview ==
In the Norwegian men’s biathlon team, Vetle Sjåstad Christiansen has been excluded from the men's squad. In the women’s team, Ingrid Landmark Tandrevold and Juni Arnekleiv returned, replacing Emilie Kalkenberg. However, Juni Arnekleiv did not compete in any races during the stage.

In the French women’s team, Sophie Chauveau was replaced in the main squad by the IBU Cup leader, Paula Botet. In the Swedish team, Hanna Öberg returned, while Sara Andersson and Anton Ivarsson skipped the stage. In the German women’s team, Sophia Schneider replaced Anna Weidel.

In the Italian team, it was announced before the stage that Lisa Vittozzi would not return this season as she focuses on preparing for the 2026 Winter Olympics. Ilaria Scattolo got the opportunity to make her World Cup debut in the Italian women’s team. In the men’s team, Elia Zeni and Patrick Braunhofer returned, and Marco Barale was given a chance to debut. The leader of the American women's biathlon team Deedra Irwin absent Oberhof stage due to illness.

For the first time since the 2006/2007 season, when the top 3 in an individual race were Irina Malgina, Liv-Kjersti Eikeland, and Zina Kocher, the World Cup podium was occupied by three biathletes who had never previously been on an individual World Cup podium. In the sprint race, the medalists were Paula Botet, Maren Kirkeeide, and Milena Todorova. This was also the first podium for the Bulgarian women’s team in 21 years, since the 2003/2004 season, when Ekaterina Dafovska finished second in the pursuit race in Oslo.

In the single mixed relay, Tero Seppälä and Suvi Minkkinen secured Finland's first-ever victory in mixed relays at the Biathlon World Cup.

== Medal winners ==
=== Men ===
Event:	Gold:	Time	Silver:	Time	Bronze:	Time
10 km Sprint	Quentin Fillon Maillet; France	23:36.2 (0+0)	Fabien Claude; France	+14.9 (0+0)	Émilien Jacquelin; France	+22.1 (0+1)
12.5 km Pursuit	Sturla Holm Lægreid; Norway	33:25.5 (1+0+0+0)	Tarjei Bø; Norway	+5.2 (0+0+1+0)	Johannes Thingnes Bø; Norway	+19.7 (2+0+1+0)

=== Women ===
Event:	Gold:	Time	Silver:	Time	Bronze:	Time
7.5 km Sprint	Paula Botet; France	22:52.8 (0+0)	Maren Kirkeeide; Norway	+31.1 (1+0)	Milena Todorova; Bulgaria	+35.0 (0+1)
10 km Pursuit	Lou Jeanmonnot; France	31:14.9 (1+0+0+0)	Maren Kirkeeide; Norway	+18.1 (0+2+0+0)	Elvira Öberg; Sweden	+26.2 (0+0+0+1)

=== Mixed ===
Event:	Gold:	Time	Silver:	Time	Bronze:	Time
Single Mixed Relay	Finland; Tero Seppälä; Suvi Minkkinen	39:17.1 (0+1) (0+0) (0+0) (0+1) (0+2) (0+1) (0+0) (0+0)	France; Quentin Fillon Maillet; Paula Botet	39:22.9 (0+2) (0+0) (0+0) (0+2) (0+1) (0+1) (0+2) (0+0)	Germany; Justus Strelow; Selina Grotian	39:42.0 (0+0) (0+0) (0+1) (0+3) (0+1) (0+0) (0+3) (0+3)
Mixed Relay	Sweden; Sebastian Samuelsson; Martin Ponsiluoma; Hanna Öberg; Elvira Öberg	1:04:24.1 (0+2) (0+1) (2+3) (0+2) (0+1) (0+0) (0+0) (0+1)	France; Fabien Claude; Éric Perrot; Jeanne Richard; Lou Jeanmonnot	1:04:36.9 (0+0) (1+3) (0+1) (0+1) (0+1) (0+1) (0+0) (0+0)	Norway; Sturla Holm Lægreid; Tarjei Bø; Ingrid Landmark Tandrevold; Maren Kirkeeide	1:05:35.5 (0+0) (0+2) (0+0) (1+3) (0+0) (0+1) (0+3) (0+0)

== Achievements ==
Best individual performance for all time

Men

- (France) Émilien Claude (25), reached No. 8 on sprint race
- (Switzerland) Dajan Danuser (28), reached No. 46 on pursuit race
- (Lithuania) Maksim Fomin (24), reached No. 50 on pursuit race
- (Bulgaria) Konstantin Vasilev (21), reached No. 51 on sprint race
- (Greenland) Sondre Slettemark (20), reached No. 65 on sprint race
- (Italy) Marco Barale (21), reached No. 72 on sprint race
- (Canada) Jasper Fleming (19), reached No. 85 on sprint race
- (Poland) Fabian Suchodolski (20), reached No. 91 on sprint race
- (Bulgaria) Vasil Zashev (22), reached No. 92 on sprint race

Women

- (France) Paula Botet (24), reached No. 1 on sprint race
- (Norway) Maren Kirkeeide (21), reached No. 2 on sprint race
- (Bulgaria) Milena Todorova (26), reached No. 3 on sprint race
- (France) Océane Michelon (22), reached No. 4 on pursuit race
- (Finland) Sonja Leinamo (22), reached No. 8 on sprint race
- (Italy) Michela Carrara (27), reached No. 16 on sprint race
- (Finland) Inka Hämäläinen (19), reached No. 30 on sprint race
- (Lithuania) Judita Traubaitė (24), reached No. 41 on sprint race
- (Latvia) Sandra Buliņa (23), reached No. 52 on sprint race
- (Ukraine) Daryna Chalyk (23), reached No. 56 on sprint race
- (Italy) Ilaria Scattolo (20), reached No. 67 on sprint race
- (Latvia) Estere Volfa (19), reached No. 76 on sprint race
- (Bulgaria) Stefani Yolova (21), reached No. 87 on sprint race

First World Cup individual race

Men

- (Italy) Marco Barale (21), reached No. 72 on sprint race
- (Canada) Jasper Fleming (19), reached No. 85 on sprint race
- (Poland) Fabian Suchodolski (20), reached No. 91 on sprint race

Women

- (Ukraine) Daryna Chalyk (23), reached No. 56 on sprint race
- (Italy) Ilaria Scattolo (20), reached No. 67 on sprint race
- (Latvia) Estere Volfa (19), reached No. 76 on sprint race
- (Bulgaria) Stefani Yolova (21), reached No. 87 on sprint race
