= Inka Hämäläinen =

Finnish biathlete (born 2005)

Personal information
- Nationality: Finnish
- Born: 17 December 2005 (age 20) Joensuu, Finland

Sport
- Country: Finland
- Sport: Biathlon
Medal record
Women's biathlon
Representing Finland
Junior World Championships
Silver medal – second place	2026 Arber	Sprint
Bronze medal – third place	2026 Arber	Individual

Inka Hämäläinen (born 17 December 2005) is a Finnish biathlete. She has competed in the Biathlon World Cup since 2023.

== Career ==
Inka Hämäläinen made her international debut in March 2021 at the age of 15 at the Youth World Championships in Obertilliach, placing 34th in the sprint and ninth with the relay team, among other results. The following year, she again participated in the championships and, together with Rebecca Sandnäs and Nea Vähäsarja, narrowly missed a medal by finishing fourth in the relay event. At the beginning of the 2022/23 season, the Finn made her IBU Cup debut in Ridnaun, finishing in the top 50 in all three competitions. She also took part in the 2023 Youth Olympic Festival, placing seventh in the individual, sprint, and mixed relay events.

In late November 2023, Hämäläinen, then the second athlete born in 2005 to do so, competed in her first World Cup race. In Östersund, she placed 75th out of 99 starters in the individual event after four shooting misses. During the season, she continued to compete in the IBU Cup, but achieved her best results at the European Championships, where she finished 23rd in the individual and 35th in the sprint.

Her first medal at an international IBU competition came in August 2024, when she won silver in the supersprint at the Summer Biathlon Junior World Championships behind Bulgarian athlete Lora Hristova. At the start of the 2024/2025 season, Hämäläinen became a regular member of the World Cup team. She made an impression from the outset: the 18-year-old competed in both the mixed and women's relays in Kontiolahti and immediately achieved two top-ten finishes. In late December, she also qualified for her first World Cup pursuit race in Le Grand-Bornand. At the beginning of the new calendar year, she earned her first World Cup points by finishing 30th in the sprint in Oberhof and confirmed this performance with 35th place in the pursuit. In both races, all four Finnish starters—Hämäläinen, Suvi Minkkinen, Sonja Leinamo, and Venla Lehtonen—scored points. The following February, she also competed in the World Championships for the first time but finished outside the top 50.

== Biathlon results ==
All results are sourced from the International Biathlon Union.

=== Olympic Games ===
0 medal

Event	Individual	Sprint	Pursuit	Mass start	Relay	Mixed relay
(Italy) 2026 Milano Cortina	56th	77th	—	—	7th	6th

=== World Championships ===
Event	Individual	Sprint	Pursuit	Mass start	Relay	Mixed relay	Single mixed relay
(Switzerland) 2025 Lenzerheide	70th	62nd	—	—	15th	—	—

=== World Cup ===
Season	Age	Overall			Individual		Sprint		Pursuit		Mass start	
Season	Age	Races	Points	Position	Points	Position	Points	Position	Points	Position	Points	Position
2023–24	17	1/21	Did not earn World Cup points									
2024–25	18	10/21	16	76th	—	—	11	71st	5	75th	—	—
2025–26	19	12/21	101	47th	11	64th	70	36th	20	59th	—	—

=== Youth and Junior World Championships ===
Year	Age	Individual	Sprint	Pursuit	Mass Start	Relay	Mixed Relay
(Austria) 2021 Obertilliach	15	53rd	34th	60th	N/A	9th	—
(United States) 2022 Soldier Hollow	16	22nd	34th	31st	N/A	4th	—
(Kazakhstan) 2023 Shchuchinsk	17	39th	24th	37th	N/A	8th	6th
(Estonia) 2024 Otepää	18	6th	23rd	N/A	31st	12th	4th
(Germany) 2026 Arber	20	Bronze	Silver	N/A	6th	9th	9th
