= Rihards Lozbers =

Latvian biathlete (born 2009)

Personal information
- Nationality: Latvian
- Born: 21 March 2009 (age 17) Talsi, Latvia

Sport
- Country: Latvia
- Sport: Biathlon
Medal record
Men's biathlon
Representing Latvia
Junior World Championships
Gold medal – first place	2026 Arber	Mixed relay
Youth World Championships
Gold medal – first place	2026 Arber	Individual
Silver medal – second place	2026 Arber	Sprint
Silver medal – second place	2026 Arber	Mass Start 60

Rihards Lozbers (born 21 March 2009) is a Latvian biathlete who has competed in the Biathlon World Cup since 2025. He participated in the 2026 Olympic Games.

== Career ==
On January 9, 2025, at the age of 15, he made his debut in senior competitions, starting in the IBU Cup and finishing 78th in the sprint. A week later, in Jakuszyce, Poland, he participated in the IBU Junior Cup, where he placed 11th in the mass start event. At the 2025 European Junior Championships in Altenberg, he did not finish the individual 15 km race but placed 72nd in the sprint. Together with Estere Volfa, he competed in the single mixed relay and secured 7th place. Later that year, at the World Youth and Junior Championships held in Östersund, Lozbers competed in the youth category. He started the championship by finishing 46th in the individual distance, then placed 14th with the mixed relay team, and concluded the competition with two 16th-place finishes — in the sprint and the mass start event. Continuing the season, he performed successfully in the last two stages of the IBU Cup, held in Otepää, achieving qualification for the World Cup. In the pursuit race, he finished among the top 40, earning IBU Cup points. On his 16th birthday, March 21, 2025, he made his World Cup debut in Holmenkollen and, with five shooting errors, finished 101st in the sprint.

He began the 2025–2026 season in the IBU Cup. In two sprint races in Obertilliach, he placed 17th and 19th, recording the third-fastest skiing time on both occasions. Subsequently, he was called up to the main Latvian team to compete in the World Cup. At the 2026 European Junior Championships in Imatra, Lozbers won two bronze medals: in the 15 km individual distance and in the single mixed relay, where he competed alongside Estere Volfa. Lozbers finished in 31st place in the pursuit during the World Cup stage in Otepää 2026, thus earning his World Cup points as a 16-year old; this result also meant that Lozbers was the youngest biathlete ever to score World Cup points. During the World Cup finals in Oslo the following week Lozbers finished within the top 30 three times in a row; his best results were a 21st and 23rd position in the sprint and mass start races, respectively.

== Biathlon results ==
All results are sourced from the International Biathlon Union.

=== Olympic Games ===
0 medal

Event	Individual	Sprint	Pursuit	Mass start	Relay	Mixed relay
(Italy) 2026 Milano Cortina	88th	32nd	47th	—	18th	—

=== Youth and Junior World Championships ===
0 medals

Year	Age	Individual	Sprint	Mass Start	Mixed Relay
(Sweden) 2025 Östersund	15	46th	16th	16th	14th
(Germany) 2026 Arber	16	Gold	Silver	Silver	Gold
