= 2024–25 Biathlon World Cup – Stage 9 =

2024–25 Biathlon World Cup Stage

The 2024–25 Biathlon World Cup – Stage 9 was the ninth event of the season and was held in Holmenkollen, Norway, from 17 to 23 March 2025. Sturla Holm Lægreid claimed his first overall World Cup title, succeeding his teammate Johannes Thingnes Bø. Franziska Preuß achieved her inaugural overall World Cup victory, adding to her career accomplishments, including gold medals in relay and pursuit events at the World Championships. She secured victory World Cup title in last mass start race. The race was marked by an incident where Lou Jeanmonnot, who led the standings by five points, fell near the finish, allowing Preuß to overtake her.

== Stage overview ==
To fill the quota obtained at the IBU Cup and the Junior World Championship, the French team called up Paula Botet, Camille Bened and Amandine Mengin as well as the returning Antonin Guigonnat. The Norwegian team included Isak Frey, Kasper Kalkenberg, Juni Arnekleiv and Karoline Erdal. The German team added Stefanie Scherer, Anna Weidel, Simon Kaiser, and Roman Rees. The Italian team invited 31-year-old debutant Nicola Romanin.

In the Swedish team, Ella Halvarsson, Anna Magnusson, and Sara Andersson missed the stage due to illness. In the Czech team, Ilona Plecháčová, Heda Mikolášová, and Petr Hak had the opportunity to make their debut. Olympic champion Anastasiya Kuzmina returned to the main squad of the Slovak team.

Johannes Thingnes Bø, multiple World Cup titles and Olympic gold medals holder and his brother Tarjei Bø who has three Olympic gold medals and eleven World Championship titles have ended their careers after the races at this stage. Swiss athlete Elisa Gasparin and Canadian Emma Lunder also competed in the final races of their careers.

== Schedule of events ==
The events took place at the following times.

Date	Time	Events
21 March	13:30 CET	Men's 10 km Sprint
21 March	16:20 CET	Women's 7.5 km Sprint
22 March	13:45 CET	Men's 12.5 km Pursuit
22 March	15:50 CET	Women's 10 km Pursuit
23 March	13:15 CET	12.5 km Women's Mass Start
23 March	15:40 CET	15 km Men's Mass Start

== Medal winners ==
=== Men ===
Event:	Gold:	Time	Silver:	Time	Bronze:	Time
10 km Sprint details	Johannes Thingnes Bø; Norway	24:49.5 (0+0)	Sturla Holm Lægreid; Norway	25:15.2 (0+0)	Johannes Dale-Skjevdal; Norway	25:26.2 (0+1)
12.5 km Pursuit details	Sturla Holm Lægreid; Norway	31:45.0 (0+0+0+0)	Johannes Thingnes Bø; Norway	+15.5 (1+1+0+1)	Quentin Fillon Maillet; France	+23.9 (0+0+1+0)
15 km Mass Start details	Sebastian Samuelsson; Sweden	39:11.8 (0+0+1+0)	Éric Perrot; France	+5.6 (0+1+0+0)	Endre Strømsheim; Norway	+9.3 (0+0+0+0)

=== Women ===
Event:	Gold:	Time	Silver:	Time	Bronze:	Time
7.5 km Sprint details	Franziska Preuß; Germany	20:57.2 (0+0)	Lou Jeanmonnot; France	20:57.4 (0+0)	Suvi Minkkinen; Finland	21:19.1 (0+0)
10 km Pursuit details	Lou Jeanmonnot; France	30:16.9 (0+1+0+0)	Elvira Öberg; Sweden	+22.2 (2+0+0+0)	Lena Häcki-Groß; Switzerland	+24.2 (1+0+1+0)
12.5 km Mass Start details	Franziska Preuß; Germany	38:23.8 (0+0+1+0)	Elvira Öberg; Sweden	+3.3 (1+1+1+0)	Lou Jeanmonnot; France	+11.7 (1+0+0+0)

== Achievements ==
Best individual performance for all time

Men

- (Norway) Isak Frey (21), reached No. 4 on sprint race
- (Sweden) Viktor Brandt (25), reached No. 9 on pursuit race
- (Austria) Fabian Müllauer (22), reached No. 31 on sprint race
- (Finland) Jimi Klemettinen (19), reached No. 34 on pursuit race
- (Czech Republic) Petr Hak (21), reached No. 35 on sprint race
- (Italy) Nicola Romanin (31), reached No. 67 on sprint race
- (Belgium) Marek Mackels (25), reached No. 73 on sprint race
- (Estonia) Yaroslav Neverov (20), reached No. 81 on sprint race
- (Norway) Kasper Kalkenberg (19), reached No. 82 on sprint race
- (Latvia) Rihards Lozbers (16), reached No. 101 on sprint race

Women

- (France) Camille Bened (24), reached No. 13 on sprint race
- (Norway) Karoline Erdal (27), reached No. 14 on sprint race
- (Croatia) Anika Kožica (27), reached No. 46 on sprint race
- (France) Amandine Mengin (20), reached No. 64 on sprint race
- (Czech Republic) Ilona Plecháčová (18), reached No. 90 on sprint race
- (Austria) Lara Wagner (22), reached No. 96 on sprint race
- (Czech Republic) Heda Mikolášová (19), reached No. 97 on sprint race

First World Cup individual race

Men

- (Czech Republic) Petr Hak (21), reached No. 35 on sprint race
- (Italy) Nicola Romanin (31), reached No. 67 on sprint race
- (Norway) Kasper Kalkenberg (19), reached No. 82 on sprint race
- (Latvia) Rihards Lozbers (16), reached No. 101 on sprint race

Women

- (France) Camille Bened (24), reached No. 13 on sprint race
- (France) Amandine Mengin (20), reached No. 64 on sprint race
- (Czech Republic) Ilona Plecháčová (18), reached No. 90 on sprint race
- (Austria) Lara Wagner (22), reached No. 96 on sprint race
- (Czech Republic) Heda Mikolášová (19), reached No. 97 on sprint race
