= Sonja Leinamo =

Finnish biathlete (born 2002)

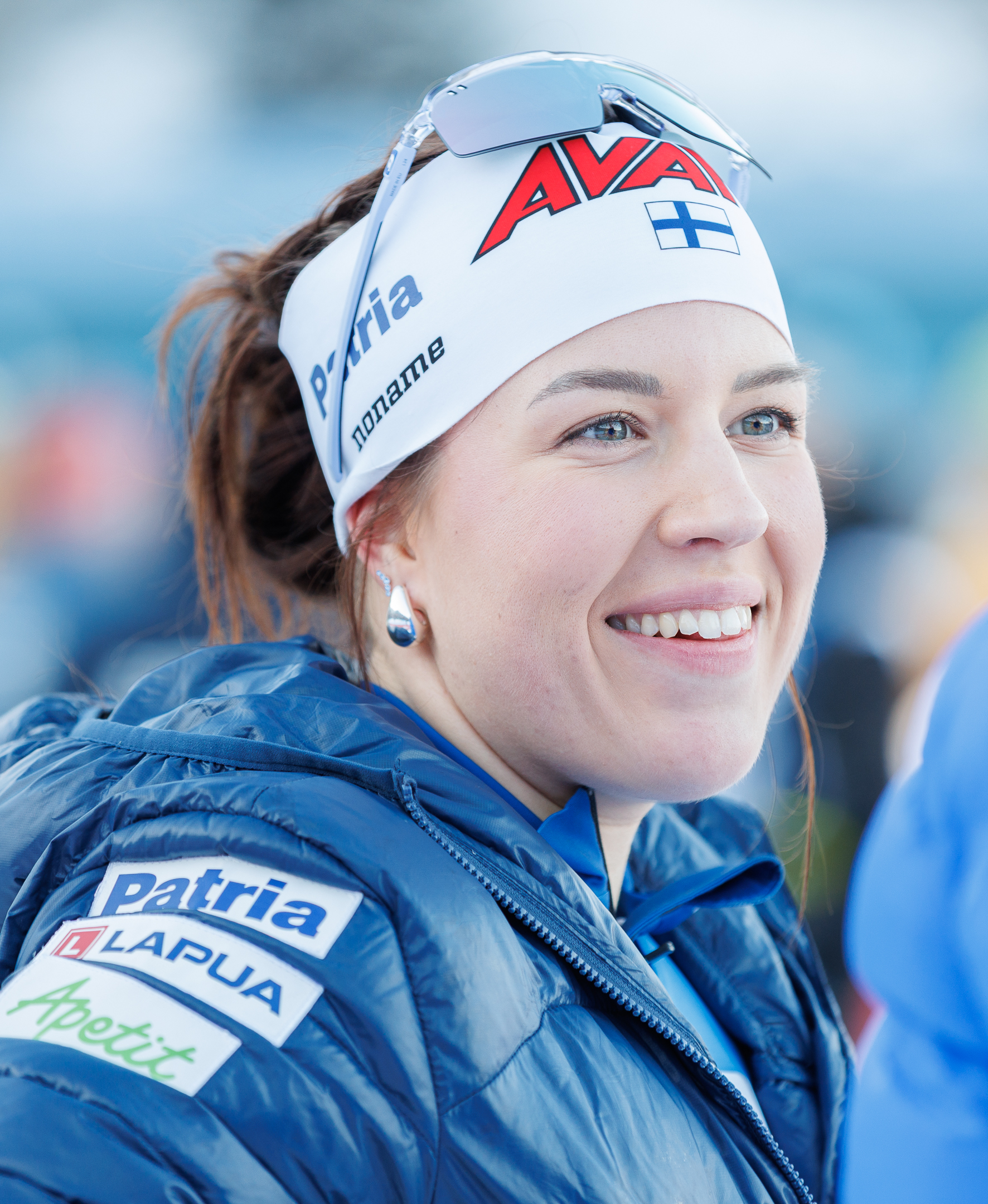
- Leinamo in 2025

Personal information
- Nationality: Finnish
- Born: 22 February 2002 (age 24) Hämeenlinna, Finland

Sport
- Country: Finland
- Sport: Biathlon

Sonja Leinamo (born 22 February 2002) is a Finnish biathlete and former cross-country skier. She has competed in the Biathlon World Cup since 2023.

== Career ==
=== Cross-country skiing and Youth Olympic Games ===
Sonja Leinamo began her career as a cross-country skier and participated in several Finnish junior and senior championships starting in 2019. In early 2019, she secured her only national title by winning the pursuit race at the junior championships. In January 2020, the Finnish athlete competed in the Youth Olympic Games, reaching the quarterfinals in the sprint event and finishing 24th out of 82 starters. Additionally, she placed 46th in the 5 km classic race.

=== Biathlon ===
In the 2020/21 season, Leinamo switched to biathlon and participated in the Youth World Championships in March 2021. At the beginning of the 2021/22 winter, she made her IBU Cup debut in Obertilliach, finishing 82nd and 83rd in the individual and sprint races, respectively. However, she competed in only a few races throughout the season. In the following season, the Finn regularly competed at the second-highest level and scored her first ranking points by finishing 23rd in the sprint at Pokljuka. She achieved the same 23rd-place result in the sprint event at the European Championships. At both junior championships, she did not come close to podium finishes. However, at the season finale in Oslo, she secured her first World Cup start, finishing 76th in the sprint with three shooting misses.

At the start of the 2023/24 season, Leinamo became a regular member of the World Cup team for the first time. At the season opener in Östersund, she finished 59th in the individual race and, along with Suvi Minkkinen, Erika Jänkä, and Noora Kaisa Keränen, secured 18th place in the relay. In the sprint competition in Lenzerheide, the Finn reached her first pursuit race at this level by finishing 47th in the sprint. A few weeks later in Oberhof, she helped the Finnish relay team achieve a top-ten finish for the first time. She also performed well in her final Junior European Championships, winning the silver medal in the sprint behind Lara Wagner.

In the following 2024/2025 season, Sonja Leinamo competed in the relay alongside Suvi Minkkinen, Venla Lehtonen, and Inka Hämäläinen, with the Finnish team securing 8th place. In the shortened 12.5 km individual race, she finished 54th with four shooting misses, placing outside the points. However, she achieved a new personal best in the sprint, finishing 27th with one shooting miss, earning World Cup points for the first time in her career. In the sprint in Annecy - Le Grand Bornand, she struggled with five shooting misses, finishing 83rd and missing the pursuit by a wide margin. At the start of 2025, Sonja Leinamo delivered her best performance in the Oberhof sprint, achieving an 8th-place finish after shooting clean for the first time in her sprint career.

== Biathlon results ==
All results are sourced from the International Biathlon Union.

=== Olympic Games ===
0 medal

| Event | Individual | Sprint | Pursuit | Mass start | Relay | Mixed relay |
|---|---|---|---|---|---|---|
| (Italy) 2026 Milano Cortina | 29th | 70th | — | — | 7th | — |

=== World Championships ===
| Event | Individual | Sprint | Pursuit | Mass start | Relay | Mixed relay | Single mixed relay |
|---|---|---|---|---|---|---|---|
| (Switzerland) 2025 Lenzerheide | 53rd | 82nd | — | — | 15th | 9th | — |

=== World Cup ===
| Season | Age | Overall | | | Individual | | Sprint | | Pursuit | | Mass start | |
| Season | Age | Races | Points | Position | Points | Position | Points | Position | Points | Position | Points | Position |
|---|---|---|---|---|---|---|---|---|---|---|---|---|
| 2022–23 | 20 | 1/20 | Did not earn World Cup points | | | | | | | | | |
| 2023–24 | 21 | 10/21 | Did not earn World Cup points | | | | | | | | | |
| 2024–25 | 22 | 10/21 | 65 | 61st | 2 | 67th | 51 | 42nd | 12 | 62nd | — | — |

==== Individual podiums ====
- 1 podium

| No. | Season | Date | Location | Level | Race | Place |
|---|---|---|---|---|---|---|
| 1 | 2025–26 | 2 December 2025 | (Sweden) Östersund | World Cup | Individual | 2nd |

=== Youth and Junior World Championships ===
| Year | Age | Individual | Sprint | Pursuit | Mass Start | Relay |
|---|---|---|---|---|---|---|
| (Austria) 2021 Obertilliach | 18 | 52nd | 42nd | 32nd | N/A | 9th |
| (United States) 2022 Soldier Hollow | 19 | DNS | 32nd | 34th | N/A | 9th |
| (Kazakhstan) 2023 Shchuchinsk | 20 | 29th | 25th | 31st | N/A | 10th |
| (Estonia) 2024 Otepää | 21 | 13th | 14th | N/A | 6th | 13th |
