= 2024–25 Biathlon World Cup – Stage 3 =

2024–25 Biathlon World Cup Stage

The 2024–25 Biathlon World Cup – Stage 3 was the third event of the season and was held in Le Grand-Bornand, France, from 16 to 22 December 2024.

== Stage overview ==
In the Norwegian women's team, Ingrid Landmark Tandrevold is skipping the stage due to health issues, and Juni Arnekleiv is absent due to poor competitive form. Hanna Öberg also ended her World Cup appearances this year due to poor competitive form and Johanna Skottheim has been called up to replace her. Last season's overall World Cup winner, Lisa Vittozzi, was unable to start at the season opener due to back problems, she also ruled out participation in Hochfilzen and Le Grand-Bornand. Beatrice Trabucchi, Elia Zeni, and Patrick Braunhofer have also been removed from the main italian team. The leader of the Czech women's team, Markéta Davidová, is skipping the stage due to recurring back pain. Among other notable biathletes missing the stage due to illness are Niklas Hartweg, Amy Baserga, Aita Gasparin, Elisa Gasparin, Julia Kink, Anna-Karin Heijdenberg, and Dunja Zdouc. After the extended quotas for the French women's and Norwegian men's teams expired, it was decided to exclude Gilonne Guigonnat and Tarjei Bø from the World Cup teams. Tarjei Bø is expected to compete in the mass start under the quota for the top 25 athletes in the overall standings.

Martin Uldal claimed his first career victory and reached his first the World Cup podium. Anamarija Lampič reached the World Cup podium for the first time, finishing third in the sprint. In the mass start, Selina Grotian achieved her first career podium and victory.

The World Cup leaders after the events in Le Grand-Bornand were Johannes Thingnes Bø for the men and Franziska Preuß for the women. The U-23 World Cup ranking leaders after the events in Le Grand-Bornand were Campbell Wright for the men and Jeanne Richard for the women.

== Schedule of events ==
The events took place at the following times.

Date	Time	Events
19 December	14:20 CET	Men's 10 km Sprint
20 December	14:20 CET	Women's 7.5 km Sprint
21 December	12:30 CET	Men's 12.5 km Pursuit
21 December	14:45 CET	Women's 10 km Pursuit
22 December	12:30 CET	15 km Men's Mass Start
22 December	14:45 CET	12.5 km Women's Mass Start

== Medal winners ==
=== Men ===
Event:	Gold:	Time	Silver:	Time	Bronze:	Time
10 km Sprint	Martin Uldal; Norway	23:13.5 (0+0)	Johannes Thingnes Bø; Norway	23:14.9 (1+0)	Sebastian Samuelsson; Sweden	23:24.3 (0+1)
12.5 km Pursuit	Johannes Thingnes Bø; Norway	31:25.4 (0+0+0+1)	Éric Perrot; France	+27.6 (0+0+0+0)	Émilien Jacquelin; France	+47.5 (0+0+1+1)
15 km Mass Start	Tarjei Bø; Norway	37:20.8 (0+0+0+1)	Danilo Riethmüller; Germany	+4.0 (0+1+0+0)	Johannes Thingnes Bø; Norway	+9.7 (0+1+1+1)

=== Women ===
Event:	Gold:	Time	Silver:	Time	Bronze:	Time
7.5 km Sprint	Justine Braisaz-Bouchet; France	21:19.2 (0+1)	Franziska Preuß; Germany	+1.4 (0+0)	Anamarija Lampič; Slovenia	+13.7 (0+2)
10 km Pursuit	Franziska Preuß; Germany	29:09.9 (0+0+1+0)	Julia Simon; France	+27.3 (0+2+0+0)	Vanessa Voigt; Germany	+44.3 (0+0+0+0)
12.5 km Mass Start	Selina Grotian; Germany	38:35.4 (0+0+1+0)	Franziska Preuß; Germany	+12.7 (0+0+0+0)	Paulína Bátovská Fialková; Slovakia	+35.4 (1+0+2+0)

== Achievements ==
Best individual performance for all time

Men

- (Norway) Martin Uldal (23), reached No. 1 on sprint race
- (Germany) Danilo Riethmüller (25), reached No. 2 on mass start race
- (Czech Republic) Jonáš Mareček (23), reached No. 21 on sprint race
- (Estonia) Jakob Kulbin (19), reached No. 42 on sprint race
- (Austria) Fabian Müllauer (21), reached No. 75 on sprint race
- (Lithuania) Nikita Čigak (22), reached No. 81 on sprint race

Women

- (Germany) Selina Grotian (20), reached No. 1 on mass start race
- (Slovenia) Anamarija Lampič (29), reached No. 3 on sprint race
- (France) Jeanne Richard (22), reached No. 4 on pursuit race
- (Norway) Maren Kirkeeide (21), reached No. 5 on pursuit race
- (Finland) Venla Lehtonen (29), reached No. 7 on pursuit race
- (Belgium) Lotte Lie (29), reached No. 7 on mass start race
- (Italy) Hannah Auchentaller (23), reached No. 9 on sprint race
- (Italy) Martina Trabucchi (22), reached No. 17 on mass start race
- (Lithuania) Natalija Kočergina (39), reached No. 25 on sprint race
- (Finland) Inka Hamalainen (19), reached No. 51 on pursuit race
- (Poland) Daria Gembicka (23), reached No. 52 on pursuit race
- (United States) Grace Castonguay (23), reached No. 53 on pursuit race
- (Ukraine) Liliia Steblyna (24) reached No. 77 on sprint race
- (Latvia) Elza Bleidele (19) reached No. 79 on sprint race
- (Kazakhstan) Milana Geneva (20) reached No. 89 on sprint race
- (United Kingdom) Shawna Pendry (22) reached No. 90 on sprint race

First World Cup individual race

Men

- (Lithuania) Nikita Čigak (22), reached No. 81 on sprint race

Women

- (Ukraine) Liliia Steblyna (24) reached No. 77 on sprint race
- (Latvia) Elza Bleidele (19) reached No. 79 on sprint race
- (Kazakhstan) Milana Geneva (20) reached No. 89 on sprint race
- (United Kingdom) Shawna Pendry (22) reached No. 90 on sprint race
