= Oscar Lombardot =

French biathlete (born 2000)

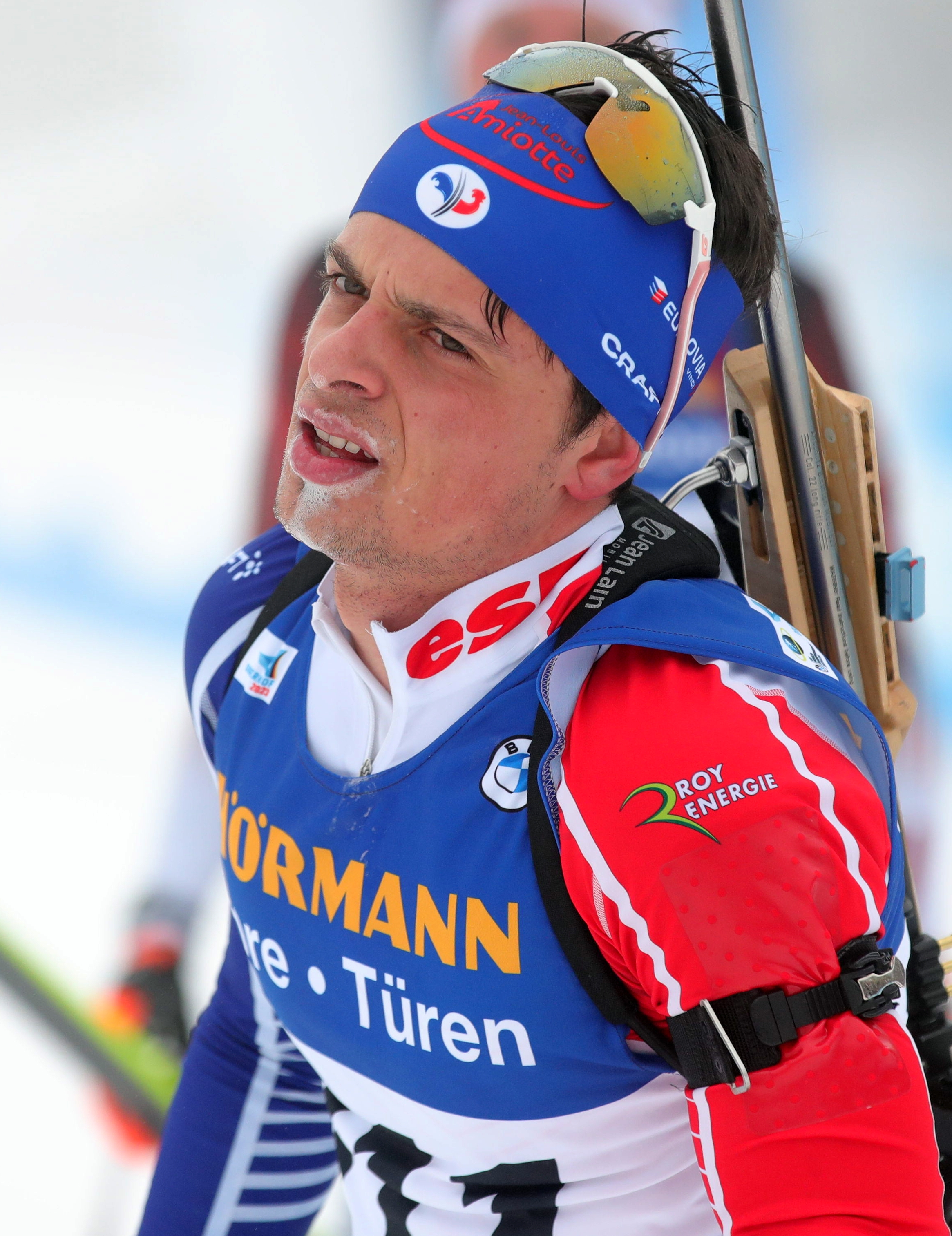
- Lombardot in 2023

Personal information
- Nationality: French
- Born: 23 April 2000 (age 26) Pontarlier, France

Sport
- Country: France
- Sport: Biathlon
Medal record
Men's biathlon
Representing France
European Championships
| Bronze medal – third place | 2025 Val Martello | 4 × 7.5 km relay |
Junior World Championships
| Gold medal – first place | 2021 Obertilliach | 4 × 7.5 km relay |
| Gold medal – first place | 2022 Soldier Hollow | 4 × 7.5 km relay |

Oscar Lombardot (born 23 April 2000) is a French biathlete. He made his debut in the Biathlon World Cup in 2020.

== Career ==
Oscar Lombardot began his international career in the IBU Junior Cup races close to his hometown in Les Rousses towards the end of 2018. Subsequently, he participated in the 2019 Junior World Championships in Osrblie the following year, achieving top ten placements twice. Following another top 10 finish in the 2019/20 Junior Cup, Lombardot selected to the IBU Cup in January, also held in Osrblie. His debut in the World Cup races in Hochfilzen by the end of 2020 led to finishes of 81st and 86th place. Shortly after, he secured podium placements in the relay and mixed relay at Arber, and clinched his first gold medal at the 2021 Junior World Championships in Obertilliach alongside Sébastien Mahon, Éric Perrot, and Émilien Claude. During the winter of 2021/22, Lombardot attained his highest individual ranking, securing seventh place in the short individual race in Osrblie, which he then surpassed with a fourth-place finish in the individual race at the European Championships. He later secured his second relay gold at the 2022 Junior World Championships, this time with Rémi Broutier, Paul Fontaine, and Jacques Jefferies. Following a promising start to the 2021/22 season, Lombardot achieved his first two individual podium finishes in Ridnaun. He also replaced Éric Perrot at the Pokljuka World Cup, earning his first World Cup points with a 38th-place finish in the pursuit. This was surpassed by a 35th-place finish in the pursuit in Antholz. While the World Championships and the end of the season didn't yield success in individual competitions, Lombardot competed in his first World Cup relay in Östersund, finishing second behind the Norwegian team with Antonin Guigonnat, Éric Perrot, and Fabien Claude. Following his strong performances during the previous winter season, Oscar Lombardot has been selected for the first time to the A team for the 2023–2024 season.

== Biathlon results ==
All results are sourced from the International Biathlon Union.

=== World Championships ===
| Event | Individual | Sprint | Pursuit | Mass start | Relay | Mixed relay | Single mixed relay |
|---|---|---|---|---|---|---|---|
| (Germany) 2023 Oberhof | 70th | 64th | — | — | — | — | — |

=== World Cup ===
| Season | Age | Overall | | | Individual | | Sprint | | Pursuit | | Mass start | |
| Season | Age | Races | Points | Position | Points | Position | Points | Position | Points | Position | Points | Position |
|---|---|---|---|---|---|---|---|---|---|---|---|---|
| 2020–21 | 20 | 2/26 | Didn't earn World Cup points | | | | | | | | | |
| 2022–23 | 22 | 8/21 | 12 | 82nd | 3 | 61st | — | — | 9 | 65th | — | — |
| 2023–24 | 23 | 8/21 | 55 | 51st | 25 | 37th | 3 | 70th | 17 | 52nd | 10 | 39th |
| 2024–25 | 24 | 6/21 | 103 | 45th | 23 | 44th | 23 | 51st | 31 | 44th | 26 | 36th |

==== Relay podiums ====
| No. | Season | Date | Location | Level | Race | Place | Teammate |
|---|---|---|---|---|---|---|---|
| 1 | 2022–23 | 11 March 2023 | (Sweden) Östersund | World Cup | Relay | 2nd | Guigonnat, Perrot, F. Claude |
| 2 | 2024–25 | 9 March 2025 | (Czech Republic) Nové Město | World Cup | Relay | 1st | É. Claude, F. Claude, Fillon Maillet |
