= Sydney Wüstling =

German biathlete (born 2008)

Personal information
- Full name: Sydney Laureen Wüstling
- Born: 22 November 2008 (age 18)

Sport
- Country: Germany

Professional information
- Sport: Biathlon
- Club: DSV Biathlon
Medal record
Women's biathlon
Representing Germany
Youth World Championships
Gold medal – first place	2025 Östersund	3 × 6 km relay
Junior World Championships
Gold medal – first place	2026 Arber	4 × 6 km relay
Bronze medal – third place	2026 Arber	7.5 km sprint

Sydney Wüstling (born 22 November 2008) is a German biathlete. She was part of the winning relay teams for Germany at both the 2025 Youth World Championships and the 2026 Junior World Championships as well as earning an individual bronze medal in the 7.5 km sprint event. She was named Junior Sportswoman of the Year in biathlon in 2026 by the German Ski Association.

== Biathlon results ==
All results are sourced from the International Biathlon Union.

=== Youth and Junior World Championships ===
3 medals

Year	Age	Individual	Sprint	Mass Start 60	Relay	Mixed Relay
(Sweden) 2025 Östersund	16	20	65th	6th	Gold	—
(Germany) 2026 Arber	17	10th	Bronze	8th	Gold	5th
