= Biathlon Junior World Championships 2026 =

Biathlon event in Germany

2026 IBU Youth & Junior World Championships
- Host city: Arber, Germany
- Dates: 25 February – 8 March
- Main venue: Hohenzollern Skistadion
- Participation: 436 athletes from 41 nations
- Events: 18

The 2026 Biathlon Junior World Championships are held from 25 February to 8 March 2026 in Arber, Germany.

== Medal summary ==
=== Medal table ===
* Host nation (Germany)

Rank	Nation	Gold	Silver	Bronze	Total
1	Latvia	3	3	1	7
2	Slovakia	3	0	0	3
3	Norway	2	5	1	8
4	France	2	4	1	7
5	Austria	2	1	2	5
6	Ukraine	1	2	3	6
7	Sweden	1	1	1	3
8	Germany*	1	0	2	3
9	Bulgaria	1	0	1	2
9	Italy	1	0	1	2
11	Poland	1	0	0	1
12	Finland	0	1	3	4
13	Estonia	0	1	2	3
Totals (13 entries)		18	18	18	54

=== Junior events ===
==== Men ====
Event	Gold		Silver		Bronze	
15 km individual details	Philip Lindkvist-Fløtten; Sweden	49:44.0 (0+0+0+0)	Léo Carlier; France	50:30.7 (0+0+0+1)	Jakob Kulbin; Estonia	52:00.6 (2+1+1+1)
10 km sprint details	Grzegorz Galica; Poland	27:46.4 (0+2)	Philip Lindkvist-Fløtten; Sweden	28:10.1 (0+0)	Kasper Kalkenberg; Norway	28:18.4 (0+0)
12 km mass start 60 details	Kasper Kalkenberg; Norway	31:15.4 (0+2+0+0)	Jakob Kulbin; Estonia	31:34.3 (1+2+0+0)	Philip Lindkvist-Fløtten; Sweden	31:39.0 (1+1+0+2)
4 × 7.5 km relay details	France Camille Grataloup-Manissolle; Antonin Delsol; Guillaume Poirot; Léo Carlier	1:21:13.9 (0+0) (0+0) (0+1) (0+1) (0+1) (0+2) (0+1) (0+3)	Norway Andreas Haug; Leo Gundersen; Oliver Alm; Kasper Kalkenberg	1:23:13.1 (0+0) (0+0) (0+1) (3+3) (0+0) (0+1) (0+2) (0+0)	Italy Davide Cola; Hannes Bacher; Nicola Giordano; Simone Motta	1:25:02.0 (0+3) (0+1) (0+2) (0+1) (0+0) (1+3) (1+3) (0+1)

==== Women ====
Event	Gold		Silver		Bronze	
12.5 km individual details	Thémice Fontaine; France	44:42.9 (0+0+0+0)	Oleksandra Merkushyna; Ukraine	45:02.4 (1+0+0+0)	Inka Hämäläinen; Finland	45:32.5 (0+0+0+2)
7.5 km sprint details	Estere Volfa; Latvia	21:39.8 (1+0)	Inka Hämäläinen; Finland	22:33.7 (1+0)	Sydney Wüstling; Germany	22:47.0 (1+0)
9 km mass start 60 details	Oleksandra Merkushyna; Ukraine	29:17.1 (1+0+1+1)	Estere Volfa; Latvia	29:37.0 (1+2+0+1)	Elza Bleidele; Latvia	29:54.0 (0+3+1+0)
4 × 6 km relay details	Germany Johanna Lehnung; Melina Gaupp; Leni Dietersberger; Sydney Wüstling	1:13:36.5 (0+1) (0+0) (0+1) (0+2) (0+1) (0+2) (0+2) (0+1)	France Namou Canndau-Armand; Louise Roguet; Lou-Anne Dupont Ballet-Baz; Thémice Fontaine	1:13:40.2 (0+0) (1+3) (1+3) (0+0) (0+0) (0+1) (0+0) (0+1)	Ukraine Tetiana Tarasiuk; Kseniia Prykhodko; Valeriia Sheihas; Oleksandra Merkushyna	1:13:56.0 (0+1) (0+0) (0+1) (0+0) (0+1) (0+3) (1+3) (0+1)

==== Mixed ====
Event	Gold		Silver		Bronze	
4 × 6 km M+W relay details	Latvia Matīss Meirāns; Rihards Lozbers; Elza Bleidele; Estere Volfa	1:17:55.2 (0+1) (0+3) (0+3) (0+1) (0+3) (0+1) (0+1) (0+2)	Norway Oliver Alm; Kasper Kalkenberg; Agathe Brathagen; Silje Berg-Knutsen	1:17:59.7 (0+1) (0+2) (0+1) (0+1) (0+1) (0+1) (0+1) (0+0)	France Léo Carlier; Camille Grataloup-Manissolle; Lou-Anne Dupont Ballet-Baz; Thémice Fontaine	1:18:53.9 (0+2) (0+1) (0+3) (0+1) (0+0) (0+0) (0+0) (0+3)

=== Youth events ===
==== Men ====
Event	Gold		Silver		Bronze	
12.5 km individual details	Rihards Lozbers; Latvia	38:21.2 (2+0+1+0)	Taras Tarasiuk; Ukraine	39:15.7 (0+2+0+0)	Georgi Dzhorgov; Bulgaria	41:45.1 (1+1+1+0)
7.5 km sprint details	Markus Sklenárik; Slovakia	18:28.6 (0+0)	Rihards Lozbers; Latvia	18:47.6 (2+1)	Hannes Lipfert; Germany	19:13.4 (1+0)
12 km mass start 60 details	Georgi Dzhorgov; Bulgaria	36:16.4 (1+0+0+0)	Rihards Lozbers; Latvia	36:27.2 (1+1+2+3)	Tuomas Latvalahti; Finland	36:32.4 (1+0+0+2)
3 × 7.5 km relay details	Italy Andreas Braunhofer; Julian Huber; Jonas Tscholl	1:02:00.2 (0+2) (0+1) (0+1) (0+0) (0+3) (0+1)	Austria Simon Hechenberger; Tim Denner; Matti Pinter	1:02:23.2 (0+1) (0+2) (0+1) (2+3) (0+1) (0+2)	Estonia Daniel Varikov; Kristen Baumann; Frederik Vaelbe	1:02:29.9 (0+0) (0+1) (0+1) (0+3) (0+0) (0+1)

==== Women ====
Event	Gold		Silver		Bronze	
10 km individual details	Michaela Straková; Slovakia	33:15.4 (1+0+0+0)	Hanna Vølstad; Norway	34:21.0 (1+0+0+2)	Viktoriia Khvostenko; Ukraine	34:35.1 (0+1+0+0)
6 km sprint details	Michaela Straková; Slovakia	17:02.5 (0+0)	Hanna Vølstad; Norway	17:14.8 (0+1)	Selina Ganner; Austria	17:20.8 (0+1)
9 km mass start 60 details	Selina Ganner; Austria	33:46.8 (1+2+0+0)	Adèle Ouvrier-Buffet; France	33:57.0 (1+0+1+1)	Ilvy Giestheuer; Austria	34:04.7 (0+1+2+1)
3 × 6 km relay details	Norway Stine Haarstad; Hanna Vølstad; Martine Skog	53:05.6 (0+0) (0+1) (0+1) (0+0) (0+2) (0+1)	France Juliette Oliva; Matilda Dodos; Adèle Ouvrier-Buffet	54:12.9 (0+3) (0+2) (0+2) (0+0) (0+2) (0+3)	Ukraine Alina Khmil; Khrystyna Ruda; Viktoriia Khvostenko	54:37.7 (0+1) (0+2) (0+0) (0+2) (0+2) (0+0)

==== Mixed ====
Event	Gold		Silver		Bronze	
4 × 6 km M+W relay details	Austria Simon Hechenberger; Matti Pinter; Ilvy Giestheuer; Selina Ganner	1:12:29.1 (0+0) (0+3) (0+1) (0+1) (0+0) (0+1) (0+0) (0+1)	Norway Bjørn-Anders Eriksen; Emil Skjellberg; Hanna Vølstad; Martine Skog	1:13:56.0 (0+2) (0+2) (0+1) (0+3) (0+0) (0+2) (0+1) (0+0)	Finland Arttu Remes; Tuomas Latvalahti; Venla Mennala; Hanni Koski	1:14:32.3 (0+0) (0+0) (0+1) (0+1) (0+1) (0+0) (0+2) (0+3)

== See also ==
- 2025–26 Biathlon World Cup
- 2025–26 Biathlon IBU Cup
- 2026 Winter Olympics
- 2026 IBU Open European Championships
- 2026 IBU Junior Open European Championships
