= Philip Lindkvist-Fløtten =

Swedish biathlete (born 2006)

Personal information
- Born: 19 October 2006 (age 20) Norway

Sport
- Country: Sweden

Professional information
- Sport: Biathlon
- World Cup debut: 2026
Medal record
Men's biathlon
Representing Sweden
Junior World Championships
Gold medal – first place	2026 Arber	Individual
Silver medal – second place	2026 Arber	Pursuit
Bronze medal – third place	2026 Arber	Mass Start 60

Philip Lindkvist-Fløtten (born 19 October 2006) is a Swedish biathlete. He won three medals at the Biathlon Junior World Championships 2026 including a gold in the sprint, silver in the individual, and bronze in the mass start. Born and raised in Norway, Lindkvist-Fløtten elected to represent Sweden because of his mother's heritage. As a result of his Junior Worlds success, he was selected to compete at his first World Cup event in Oslo and was then named to the Swedish national biathlon A team.

== Biathlon results ==
All results are sourced from the International Biathlon Union.

=== Youth and Junior World Championships ===
3 medals

Year	Age	Individual	Sprint	Mass Start 60	Relay	Mixed relay
(Germany) 2026 Arber	19	Gold	Silver	Bronze	10th	11th
