= Danilo Riethmüller =

German biathlete (born 1999)

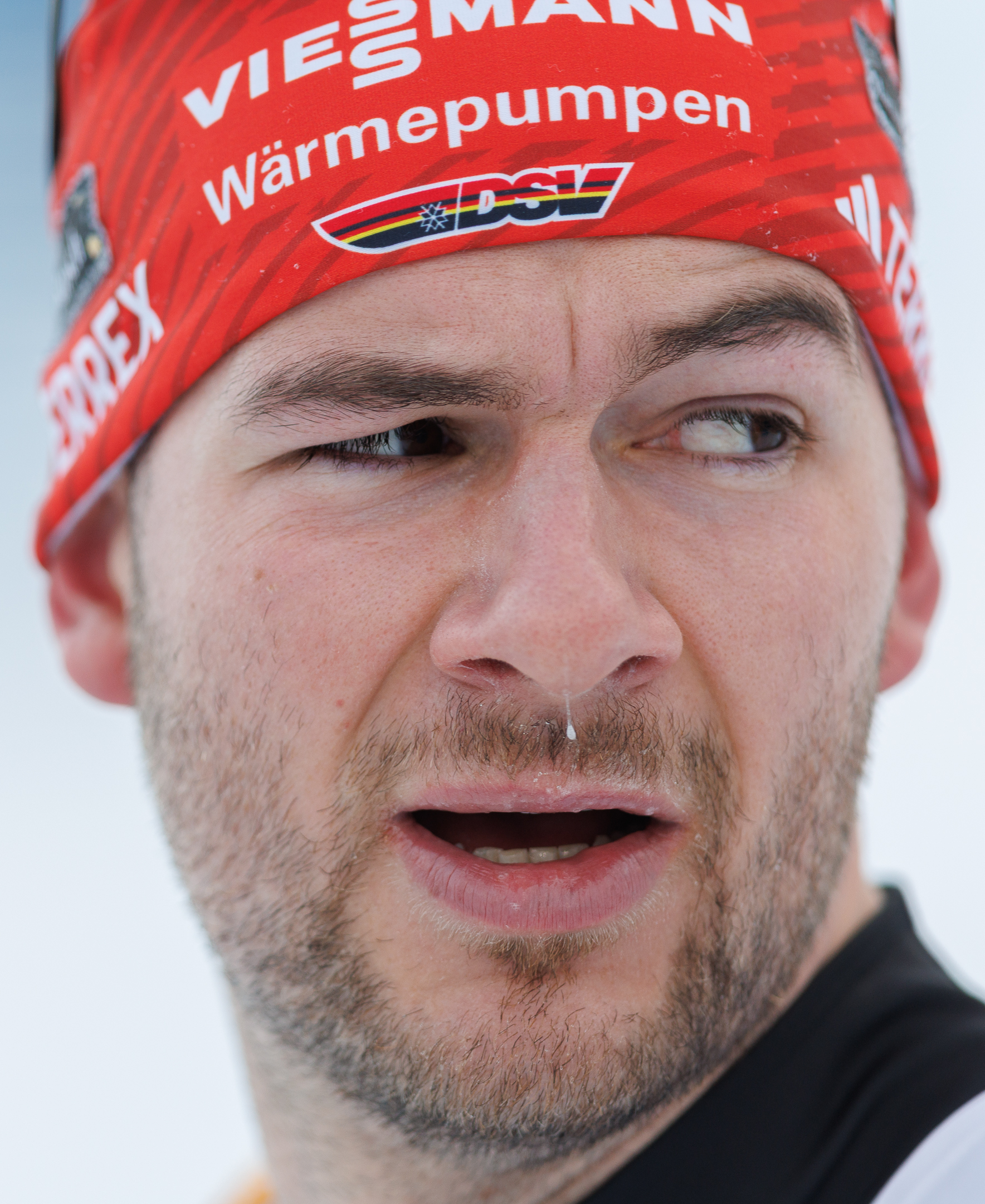
- Riethmüller in 2025

Personal information
- Nationality: German
- Born: 13 November 1999 (age 26) Blankenburg am Harz, Germany
- Height: 1.73 m (5 ft 8 in)
- Weight: 75 kg (165 lb)

Sport

Professional information
- Sport: Biathlon
- Club: WSV Clausthal-Zellerfeld
- World Cup debut: 2024

World Championships
- Teams: 1 (2025)
- Medals: 1 (0 gold)

World Cup
- Seasons: 2 (2023/24–)
- Individual podiums: 1
- All podiums: 2
Medal record
World Championships
Bronze medal – third place	2025 Lenzerheide	4 × 7.5 km relay
European Championships
Silver medal – second place	2026 Sjusjøen	4 × 7.5 km relay
Junior World Championships
Gold medal – first place	2020 Lenzerheide	Pursuit
Silver medal – second place	2019 Osrblie	4 × 7.5 km relay
Silver medal – second place	2020 Lenzerheide	4 × 7.5 km relay
Bronze medal – third place	2017 Osrblie	4 × 7.5 km relay
Bronze medal – third place	2017 Osrblie	Pursuit
Bronze medal – third place	2017 Osrblie	Individual
Bronze medal – third place	2019 Osrblie	Individual
Winter Youth Olympics
Silver medal – second place	2016 Lillehammer	Mixed Relay
- Updated on 1 February 2026

Danilo Riethmüller (born 13 November 1999) is a German biathlete. He made his Biathlon World Cup debut in 2024 in Antholz.

== Career ==
Riethmüller's first international competition was at the 2016 Winter Youth Olympics in Lillehammer. He finished in the top 10 three times in the individual competitions and won with team Germany a silver medal in the mixed relay.

In 2017, he took part in the youth category at the Biathlon Junior World Championships in Brezno-Osrblie, where he achieved 3rd place in pursuit, individual and in the relay. In 2019, Riethmüller took part again in the Biathlon Junior World Championships, which, like in 2017, took place in Brezno-Osrblie. He came 3rd in individual and also won the silver medal in the relay. This year Riethmüller was nominated for the IBU Cup for the first time. He was able to land on the podium in his debut season with a 3rd place in the sprint in Martell.

At the individual in Antholz of the 2023/24 World Cup season, Riethmüller made his debut in the Biathlon World Cup on 18 January 2024. In the race, he took 7th place. He additionally qualified for the following mass start, reaching 24th place.

== Biathlon results ==
All results are sourced from the International Biathlon Union.

=== World Championships ===
1 medal (1 bronze)

Event	Individual	Sprint	Pursuit	Mass Start	Relay	Mixed relay	Single mixed relay
(Switzerland) 2025 Lenzerheide	22nd	40th	50th		Bronze		

=== World Cup ===
Season	Overall			Individual		Sprint		Pursuit		Mass start	
Season	Races	Points	Position	Points	Position	Points	Position	Points	Position	Points	Position
2023–24	7/21	153	37th	36	25th	50	39th	43	37th	24	35th
2024–25	To be determined										

==== Individual podiums ====
No.	Season	Date	Location	Level	Race	Place
1	2024–25	22 December 2024	(France) Annecy	World Cup	Mass Start	2nd
