= Estere Volfa =

Latvian biathlete (born 2005)

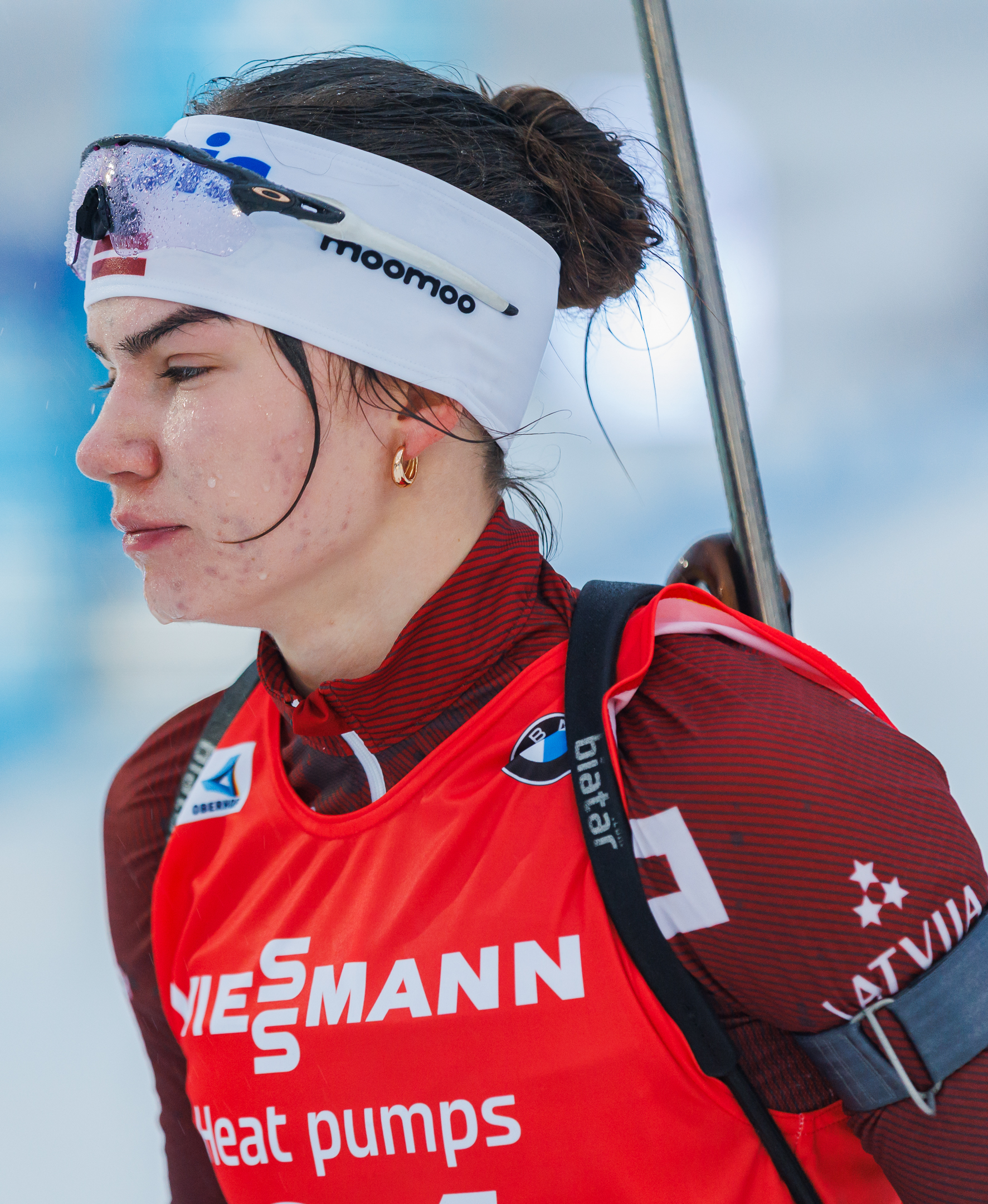
- Volfa in 2025

Personal information
- Nationality: Latvian
- Born: 11 April 2005 (age 21) Riga, Latvia

Sport
- Country: Latvia
- Sport: Biathlon
Medal record
Women's biathlon
Representing Latvia
Junior World Championships
Gold medal – first place	2026 Arber	Mixed relay
Gold medal – first place	2026 Arber	Sprint
Silver medal – second place	2026 Arber	Mass Start 60

Estere Volfa (born 11 April 2005) is a Latvian biathlete and former cross-country skier who has competed in the Biathlon World Cup since 2025.

== Career ==
Estere Volfa initially competed in cross-country skiing. At the 2021 Junior World Championships in cross-country skiing, she placed 73rd in the sprint and 68th in the 5 km freestyle. She made her senior World Championship debut in 2021 in Oberstdorf at the age of 15. She placed 82nd in the sprint and 93rd in the 10 km freestyle. At the age of 16, Volfa represented the Latvian national team at the 2022 Winter Olympic Games in Beijing. In the sprint she placed 80th and did not qualify for the quarterfinals, while in the 10 km classic she finished 83rd. Together with Kitija Auziņa, she also competed in the team sprint, placing 21st. In 2022, she also participated in the Junior World Championships in cross-country skiing. Her best result was in the 15 km freestyle mass start, where she placed 58th.

Subsequently, she focused primarily on biathlon. During the 2022–2023 season, she competed in the IBU Junior Cup. In January 2023, she participated in the European Youth Olympic Festival in Forni Avoltri. She placed 36th in the sprint, 39th in the individual race, and was part of the mixed relay team that finished 10th. In February 2023, she took part in the European Junior Biathlon Championships in Madona. Individually, she did not achieve high results, but in the mixed relay her team placed 13th. At the 2024 Youth World Championships in Otepää, her best individual result came in the 60-woman mass start, where she finished 27th. In March 2024, she made her debut in the senior IBU Cup in Obertilliach.

In 2024, Volfa, together with Elza Bleidele, began training under Ilmārs Bricis, in the same training group as Baiba Bendika, which led to a rapid improvement in her results.

Volfa earned her first IBU Cup points in the first stage of the 2024–2025 season in Idre, placing 26th in the sprint. On December 15, 2024, she achieved third place in a sprint in the IBU Junior Cup, marking her first podium finish at that level of competition. In January 2025, she made her senior World Cup debut in Oberhof, placing 76th in the sprint and finished 10th in the single mixed relay (paired with Renārs Birkentāls). In the next stage in Ruhpolding, she was included in the women's relay team for the first time, skied the first leg, and handed over the relay in fourth place, with the team ultimately finishing 15th. At the 2025 European Junior Championships in Altenberg, her best result was in the 60-woman mass start, where she finished sixth. In the single mixed relay together with Rihards Lozbērš, she placed seventh. At the 2025 European Championships for seniors, she competed only in the relay, where together with Baiba Bendika, Sandra Buliņa, and Elza Bleidele, she finished 9th. That same year, she also made her debut at the World Biathlon Championships in Lenzerheide. She placed 42nd in the sprint and finished 56th in the pursuit. She also competed in the mixed relay and the women's relay (22nd and 16th place, respectively). At the 2025 Junior World Championships in Östersund, she achieved 5th place in the individual race. She also achieved a strong result in the junior championship sprint, placing 10th. Soon after, on March 7, at the World Cup stage in Nové Město na Moravě, she placed 36th in the sprint and earned her first World Cup points.

In the first World Cup stage of the 2025–2026 season in Östersund, she set a new career best in the 15 km individual race, placing 28th. In the pursuit at the same stage, starting from 44th position and with perfect shooting, she reached 23rd place, once again improving her career-best result.

Later in the season, she reached a breakthrough result by finishing in 9th place in the sprint event in Otepää, marking her best-ever World Cup placement and first top-10 finish at senior level. Across the season, she also recorded additional points finishes, including a 36th place in the sprint in Nové Město na Moravě, confirming her growing consistency at World Cup level. Alongside her top-10 performance, she regularly qualified for pursuit races, further underlining her progress and establishing her as one of Latvia's emerging biathlon talents on the international stage.

== Personal life ==
Volfa was born in Riga but raised in Cēsis. Her mother, Ieva Cederštrēma-Volfa, was also a biathlete, competing at the 1994 and 1998 Olympic Games. Volfa attended Cēsis 1st Primary School, Cēsis State Gymnasium and the Cēsis City Sports School. She began biathlon training under coach Anžela Brice, together with her classmate Elza Bleidele.

She is studying business management at the University of Latvia.

== Biathlon results ==
All results are sourced from the International Biathlon Union.

=== Olympic Games ===
0 medal

Event	Individual	Sprint	Pursuit	Mass start	Relay	Mixed relay
(Italy) 2026 Milano Cortina	36th	16th	11th	23rd	17th	12th

=== World Championships ===
Event	Individual	Sprint	Pursuit	Mass start	Relay	Mixed relay	Single mixed relay
(Switzerland) 2025 Lenzerheide	—	42nd	56th	—	16th	22nd	—

=== World Cup ===
Season	Age	Overall			Individual		Sprint		Pursuit		Mass start	
Season	Age	Races	Points	Position	Points	Position	Points	Position	Points	Position	Points	Position
2024–25	19	6/21	12	85th	—	—	5	77th	7	68th	—	—
2025–26	20	7/21	93	50th	13	61st	34	54th	46	43rd	—	—

=== Youth and Junior World Championships ===
Year	Age	Individual	Sprint	Mass Start	Relay	Mixed Relay
(Estonia) 2024 Otepää	18	33rd	38th	27th	14th	—
(Sweden) 2025 Östersund	19	5th	10th	21st	—	—
(Germany) 2026 Arber	20	5th	Gold	Silver	—	Gold
