= Émilien Claude =

French biathlete (born 1999)

- Claude in 2026

Personal information
- Nationality: French
- Born: 13 June 1999 (age 27) Épinal, Frane

Sport
- Country: France
- Sport: Biathlon
Medal record
Men's biathlon
Representing France
World Championships
Silver medal – second place	2025 Lenzerheide	4 × 7.5 km relay
European Championships
Silver medal – second place	2021 Duszniki-Zdrój	Single mixed relay
Silver medal – second place	2022 Arber	Single mixed relay
Bronze medal – third place	2023 Lenzerheide	Single mixed relay
Winter Youth Olympics
Gold medal – first place	2016 Lillehammer	Sprint
Junior World Championships
Gold medal – first place	2021 Obertilliach	10 km Sprint
Gold medal – first place	2021 Obertilliach	12.5 km Pursuit
Gold medal – first place	2021 Obertilliach	4 × 7.5 km Relay
Bronze medal – third place	2021 Obertilliach	15 km Individual
Bronze medal – third place	2018 Otepää	4 × 7.5 km Relay
Youth World Championships
Gold medal – first place	2017 Osrblie	7.5 km Sprint
Gold medal – first place	2017 Osrblie	10 km Pursuit
- Updated on 22 February 2025

Émilien Claude (born 13 June 1999) is a French biathlete. Multiple Junior World Biathlon champion. Made his debut at the World Cup in 2021. He represented France at the 2016 Winter Youth Olympics in Lillehammer and became the first ever French youth Olympic champion in biathlon.

== Career ==
Émilien Claude has been competing in biathlon since 2010. He made his international debut in 2016 at the Youth World Championships in Cheile Grădiştei. Two weeks later, he competed at the Winter Youth Olympics in Lillehammer and won the gold medal in the sprint. The following year at the 2017 World Youth Championships in Osrblie he achieved two more victories in the sprint and pursuit.

Claude made his debut in the IBU Cup at the start of the 2018/19 season in Ridnaun, where he also achieved his first good result in sprint made an 18th place. At the end of the winter, he also took part in his first European Championships. In 2019/20, The 21-year-old Émilien made his World Cup debut in Oberhof and immediately scored World Cup points with 33rd place. Back in the juniors, he then made a breakthrough at the Junior World Championships, winning all races except individual race. He was therefore allowed to compete in the World Cup again at the end of the season, but did not finish in the points. He won his first race on the IBU Cup stage in January 2022 in the Brezno sprint, ahead of Norway's Sindre Pettersen and Russia's Petr Pashchenko.

== Personal life ==
Claude's mother Christine was also a biathlete and finished eighth in the individual race at World Championships in 1984, his father Gilles died in January 2020 in the Canadian province of Québec when he collapsed and drowned in Lac Saint-Jean during a snowmobile excursion. His older brothers Florent and Fabien are also top-level biathletes.

Claude is in a relationship with the Austrian biathlete Anna Gandler.

== Biathlon results ==
All results are sourced from the International Biathlon Union.

=== World Championships ===
1 medal (1 silver)

Event	Individual	Sprint	Pursuit	Mass start	Relay	Mixed relay	Single mixed relay
(Switzerland) 2025 Lenzerheide	—	—	—	—	Silver	—	—

=== World Cup ===
Season	Age	Overall			Individual		Sprint		Pursuit		Mass start	
Season	Age	Races	Points	Position	Points	Position	Points	Position	Points	Position	Points	Position
2020–21	21	7/26	10	85th	—	—	8	75th	2	75th	—	—
2021–22	22	2/22	35	75th	—	—	14	76th	21	58th	—	—
2022–23	23	10/21	72	48th	20	39th	23	50th	17	58th	12	41st
2023–24	24	5/21	32	61st	31	31st	—	—	1	80th	—	—
2024–25	25	19/21	387	21st	107	6th	146	19th	102	22nd	32	32nd

==== Individual podiums ====
No.	Season	Date	Location	Level	Race	Place
1	2024–25	15 January 2025	(Germany) Ruhpolding	World Cup	Individual	2nd

==== Relay podiums ====
No.	Season	Date	Location	Level	Race	Place	Teammate(s)
1	2024–25	17 January 2025	(Germany) Ruhpolding	World Cup	Relay	1st	F. Claude, Fillon Maillet, Jacquelin
2	2024–25	22 February 2025	(Switzerland) Lenzerheide	World Championships	Relay	2nd	F. Claude, Perrot, Fillon Maillet
3	2024–25	9 March 2025	(Czech Republic) Nové Město	World Cup	Relay	1st	Lombardot, F. Claude, Fillon Maillet
4	2025–26	24 January 2026	(Czech Republic) Nové Město	World Cup	Single Mixed Relay	2nd	Jeanne Richard

=== Youth and Junior World Championships ===
7 medals (5 gold, 2 bronze)

Year	Age	Individual	Sprint	Pursuit	Relay
(Romania) 2016 Cheile Gradistei	16	18th	11th	8th	—
(Slovakia) 2017 Brezno-Osrblie	17	44th	Gold	Gold	10th
(Estonia) 2018 Otepää	18	10th	14th	11th	Bronze
(Slovakia) 2019 Brezno-Osrblie	19	38th	13th	8th	5th
(Switzerland) 2020 Lenzerheide	20	—	12th	18th	—
(Austria) 2021 Obertilliach	21	Bronze	Gold	Gold	Gold
