= Paula Botet =

French biathlete (born 2000)

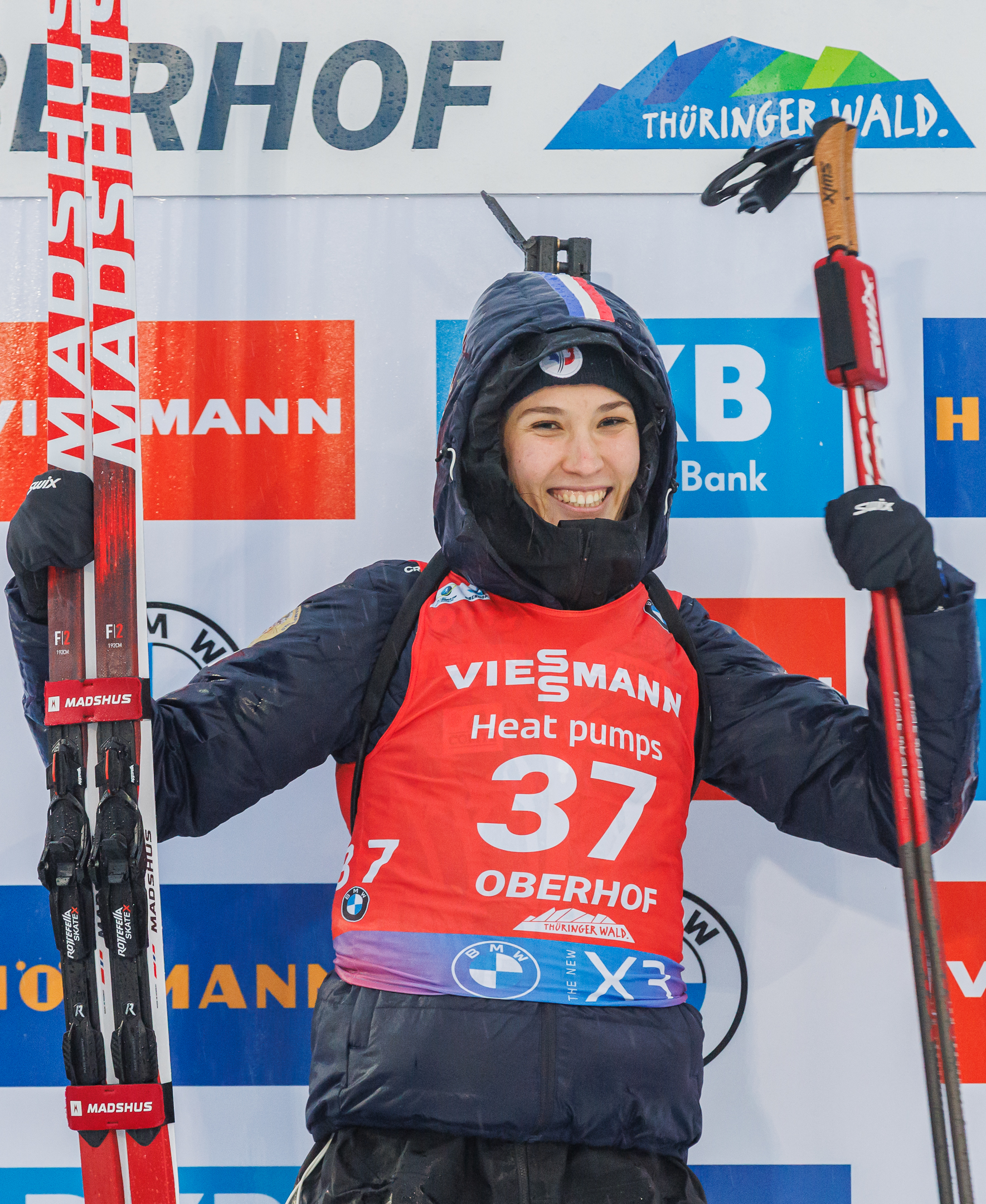
- Botet in 2025

Personal information
- Nationality: French
- Born: 19 December 2000 (age 25) Sallanches, France

Sport
- Country: France
- Sport: Biathlon
Medal record
Women's biathlon
Representing France
European Championships
Bronze medal – third place	2023 Lenzerheide	Single mixed relay
Junior World Championships
Gold medal – first place	2020 Lenzerheide	4 × 6 km relay
Gold medal – first place	2021 Obertilliach	4 × 6 km relay
Youth World Championships
Bronze medal – third place	2019 Brezno-Osrblie	3 × 6 km relay

Paula Botet (born 19 December 2000) is a French biathlete. She has competed in the Biathlon World Cup since 2022.

== Career ==
Botet began competing in biathlon in 2011. She entered the Junior Cup in the 2017/2018 season. During the 2019/2020 season, she achieved third place in the overall standings, as well as in the individual rankings for sprint and pursuit. Following this success, she transitioned to the IBU Cup in the next season. At the 2020 Junior World Championships in Lenzerheide, she won the gold medal with the relay team, though her individual races placed her outside the top 10.

The following year, at the 2021 Junior World Championships in Obertilliach, she repeated her relay triumph, while achieving fifth place in the individual race.

Botet made her World Cup debut at the first event of 2022 in Oberhof. She finished 39th in both the sprint and pursuit events, earning her first World Cup points. At the seventh World Cup of the season, she competed for the first time in the French women's relay team in the third position, contributing to a bronze medal finish. She concluded her first World Cup season ranked 79th overall.

She spent the entire 2023–2024 season on the IBU Cup circuit, but her performance was hampered by shin pain, and she did not achieve any podium finishes. She won the first sprint in Idre, which marked the start of the 2024–2025 IBU Cup season.

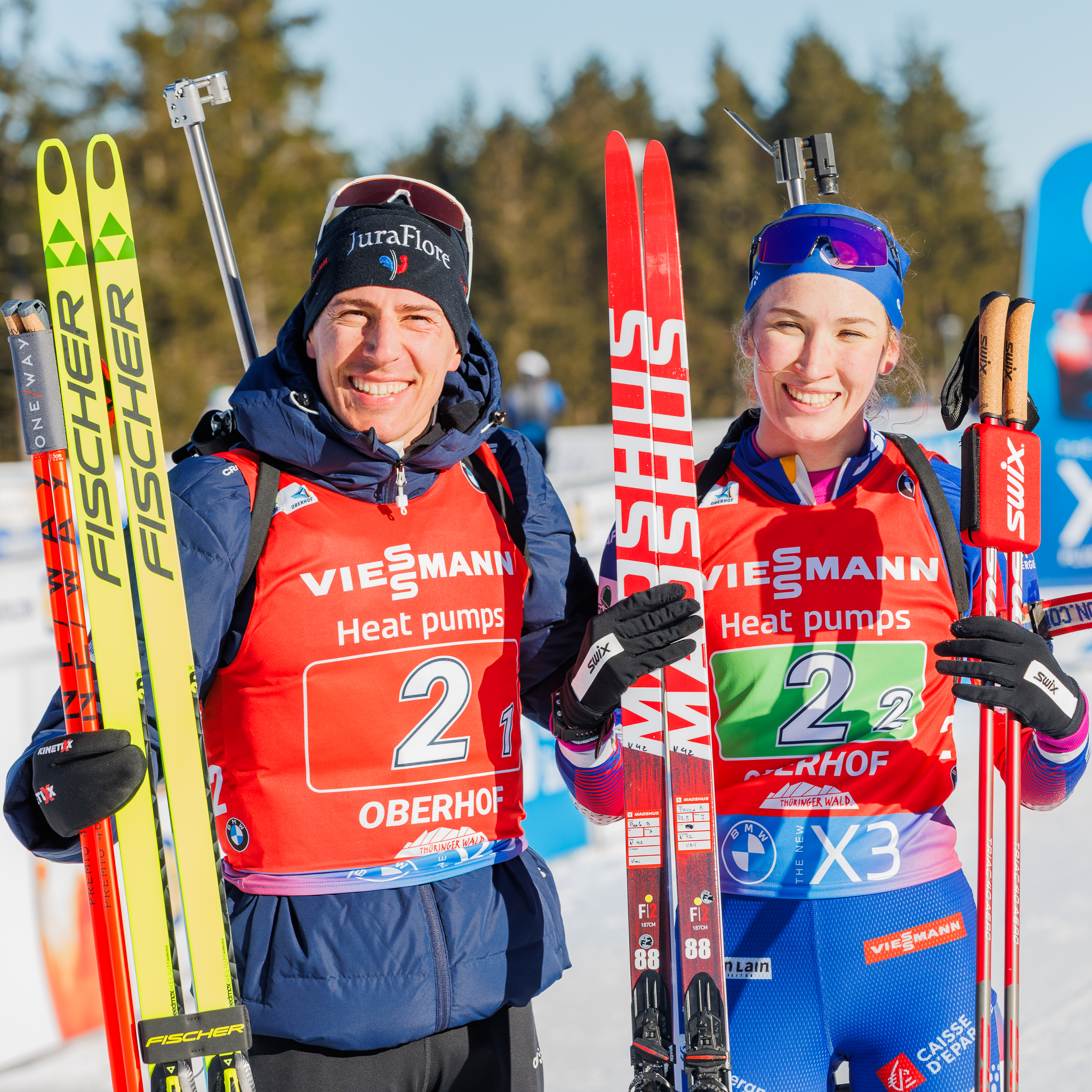
Botet in 2025 with Quentin Fillon Maillet after single mixed relay in Oberhof

== Personal life ==
Father — Yannick Bothe (osteopath, one of the first coaches of biathlete Martin Fourcade), mother — Véronique Claudel (born in 1966, biathlete).

== Biathlon results ==
All results are sourced from the International Biathlon Union.

=== World Cup ===
Season	Age	Overall			Individual		Sprint		Pursuit		Mass start	
Season	Age	Races	Points	Position	Points	Position	Points	Position	Points	Position	Points	Position
2021–22	21	9/22	25	79th	1	62nd	18	70th	6	77th	—	—
2022–23	22	3/20	26	68th	6	62nd	20	62nd	—	—	—	—
2024–25	24	8/21	214	34th	—	—	112	22nd	52	38th	50	30th
2025–26	25	2/21	9	92nd	—	—	—	—	9	70th	—	—

==== Individual podiums ====
No.	Season	Date	Location	Level	Race	Place
1	2024–25	9 January 2025	(Germany) Oberhof	World Cup	Sprint	1st

==== Relay podiums ====
No.	Season	Date	Location	Level	Race	Place	Teammate
1	2021–22	22 January 2021	(Italy) Antholz-Anterselva	World Cup	Relay	3rd	C. Chevalier, Braisaz-Bouchet, Bescond
2	2024–25	17 January 2025	(Germany) Ruhpolding	World Cup	Relay	3rd	Michelon, Braisaz-Bouchet, Simon

=== Youth and Junior World Championships ===
3 medals (2 gold, 1 bronze)

Year	Age	Individual	Sprint	Pursuit	Relay
(Estonia) 2018 Otepää	18	44th	44th	36th	—
(Slovakia) 2019 Brezno-Osrblie	19	49th	43th	16th	Bronze
(Switzerland) 2020 Lenzerheide	20	15th	14th	26th	Gold
(Austria) 2021 Obertilliach	21	5th	16th	11th	Gold
