= 2024–25 Biathlon World Cup =

Biathlon competition

Discipline	Men	Women
Overall	(Norway) Sturla Holm Lægreid (1)	(Germany) Franziska Preuß (1)
U23	(United States) Campbell Wright (1)	(France) Océane Michelon (1)
Individual	(Norway) Sturla Holm Lægreid (2)	(France) Lou Jeanmonnot (1)
Sprint	(Norway) Johannes Thingnes Bø (4)	(Germany) Franziska Preuß (1)
Pursuit	(Norway) Sturla Holm Lægreid (2)	(France) Lou Jeanmonnot (1)
Mass start	(Norway) Sturla Holm Lægreid (1)	(Germany) Franziska Preuß (2)
Relay	France (2)	France (4)
Nations Cup	France (1)	France (6)
- Mixed: Sweden (1)

Competition
Edition	48th	43rd
Locations	10	10
Individual	21	21
Relay/Team	5	5
Mixed	6	6
Rescheduled	2	2

Overall Champions

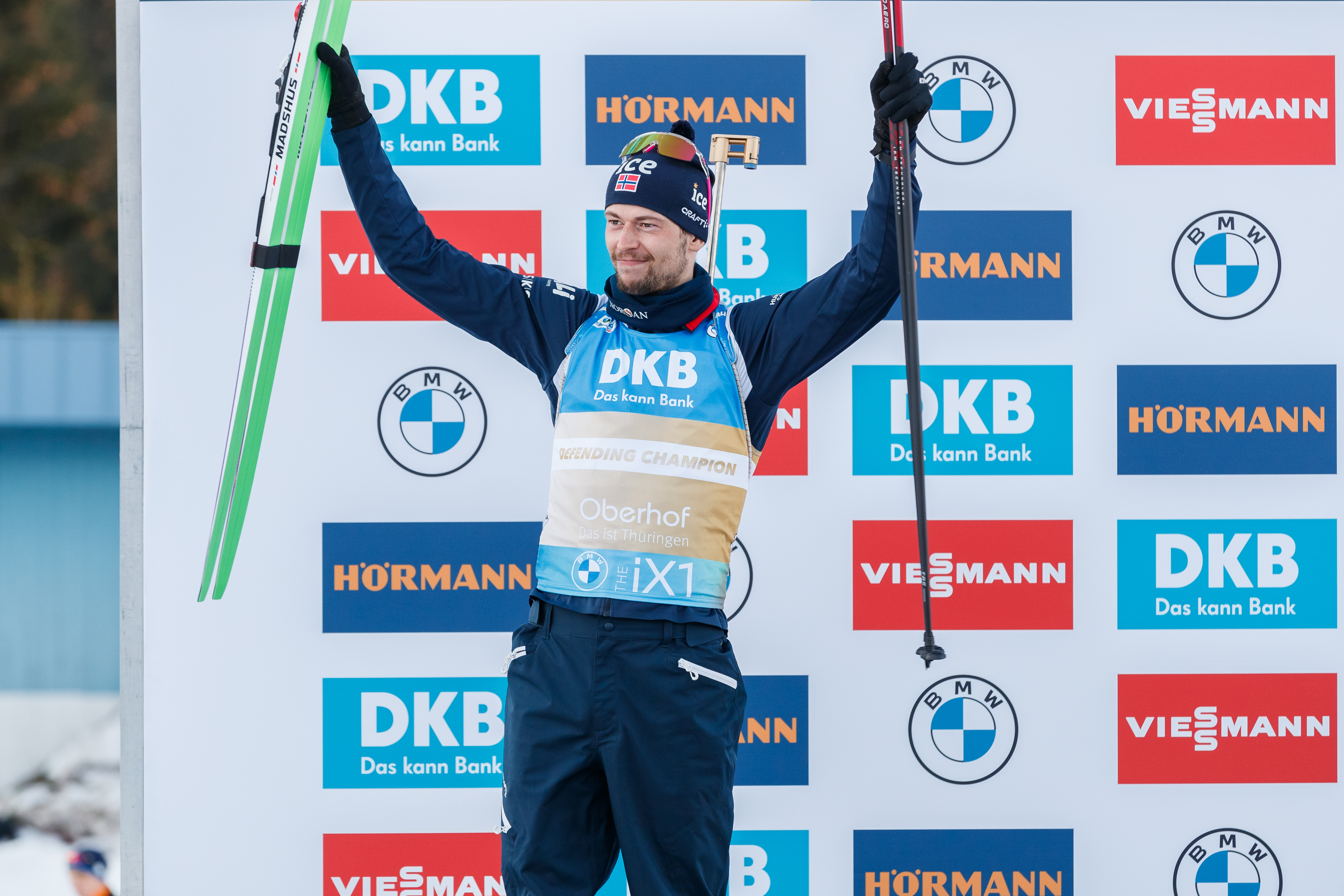
Sturla Holm Lægreid claimed his first World Cup title, securing three victories this season. He also earned small crystal globes in the individual, pursuit, and mass start standings.

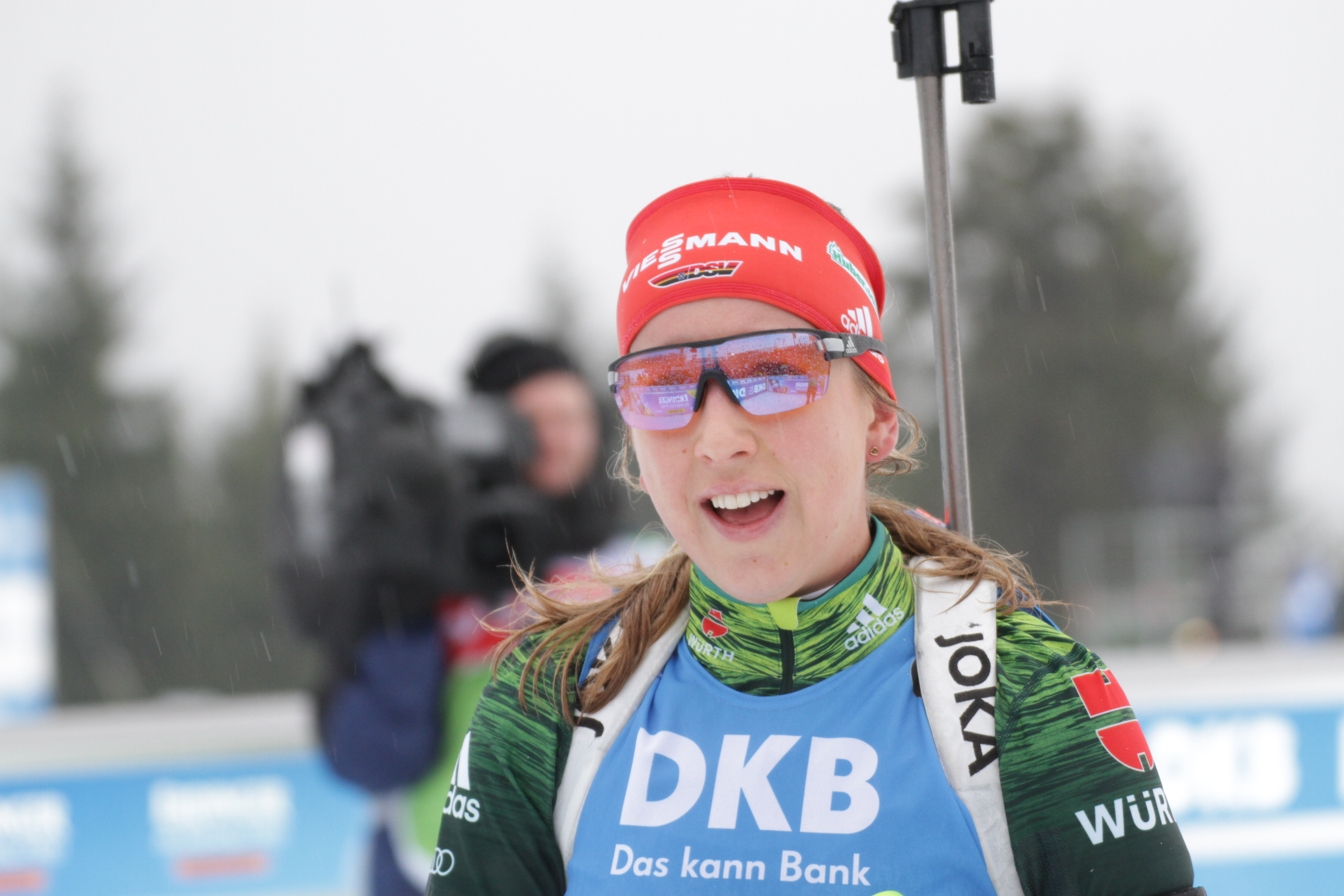
Franziska Preuß also claimed the crystal globe for the first time in her career after a season-long battle with Lou Jeanmonnot until the final race. She secured four victories, two small crystal globes (sprint and mass start), and the world champion title in pursuit.

The 2024–25 Biathlon World Cup (official: BMW IBU World Cup Biathlon), organised by the International Biathlon Union (IBU), was the 48th official World Cup season for men and 43rd edition for women as the highest level of international biathlon competitions.

The season started on 30 November 2024 in Kontiolahti, Finland and concluded on 23 March 2025 in Oslo Holmenkollen, Norway.

A major highlight of the season was the 2025 Biathlon World Championships in Lenzerheide, Switzerland, whose results were not included in the World Cup standings (except for the national standings).

Johannes Thingnes Bø from Norway and Lisa Vittozzi from Italy were the reigning champions from the previous season. Bø finished the season in 2nd place, while Vittozzi was unable to compete, having withdrawn from the entire season due to a back injury sustained during pre-season training. Additionally, Bø ended his career during the final competition in Oslo Holmenkollen.

The new World Cup winners for the season, both claiming the title for the first time, were Sturla Holm Lægreid from Norway and Franziska Preuß from Germany.

== Season overview ==
For the first time since the 2003/04 season, Östersund did not host any biathlon World Cup events.

The IBU Executive Board introduced several rule changes for the new season, based on recommendations from the Technical Committee:

- New starting order system: In individual and sprint events, the top 30 athletes could no longer choose their starting groups. Those ranked 16–30 were assigned even starting numbers between 16 and 44, while the top 15 started between 46 and 74. Designed to keep races more exciting, this system was trialed in late 2024 and remained in place throughout the season, with flexibility for earlier starts in bad weather conditions.
- Points system update: The points distribution was revised, giving more weight to athletes finishing between 3rd and 9th place. This adjustment, requested by the Athletes Committee, aims to reward consistency in the top 10, rather than focusing too heavily on podium finishes.
- U23 ranking: The U25 ranking was lowered to U23, also at the request of the Athletes Committee.
- Expanded team quotas: For the first time, the starting right for IBU Cup winners applied to the entire national team for the first two World Cups, allowing nations like Norway and France to field seven athletes in Kontiolahti and Hochfilzen.
- Additional starting quotas: Extra quota places were awarded for the last World Cup. Nations received one additional spot for each athlete in the top 10 of the previous season’s IBU Cup rankings, with a maximum of two spots per nation. The top junior from the Junior World Championships also earned a personal starting place.

Selina Grotian became the first woman born in the 2000s to win a World Cup competition.

During the single mixed relay competition in Oberhof, the Finnish team claimed their first-ever victory in the history of mixed relay events. Similarly, during the single mixed relay event in Pokljuka, the Swiss team achieved the same milestone.

By winning the short individual race in Pokljuka, Jakov Fak became the second-oldest winner in World Cup history (38 years, 4 months, and 30 days), behind only Ole Einar Bjørndalen (41 years, 10 months, and 6 days). He also recorded the second-longest gap between World Cup victories (3,644 days), trailing only Tomasz Sikora (4,049 days).

== Map of world cup hosts ==
(Finland) Kontiolahti	Location of all 10 World Cup hosts of the season (including Lenzerheide – venue of the World Championships)	(Italy) Antholz-Anterselva
(Austria) Hochfilzen	Location of all 10 World Cup hosts of the season (including Lenzerheide – venue of the World Championships)	(Switzerland) Lenzerheide
(France) Annecy–Le Grand-Bornand	Location of all 10 World Cup hosts of the season (including Lenzerheide – venue of the World Championships)	(Czech Republic) Nové Město na Moravě
(Germany) Oberhof	Location of all 10 World Cup hosts of the season (including Lenzerheide – venue of the World Championships)	(Slovenia) Pokljuka
(Germany) Ruhpolding	Location of all 10 World Cup hosts of the season (including Lenzerheide – venue of the World Championships)	(Norway) Oslo Holmenkollen

== Calendar ==
Stage	Location	Date	Individual / Short individual	Sprint	Pursuit	Mass start	Relay	Mixed relay	Single mixed relay	Details
1	(Finland) Kontiolahti	30 November–8 December	●	●		●	●	●	●	details
2	(Austria) Hochfilzen	13–15 December		●	●		●			details
3	(France) Annecy–Le Grand-Bornand	19–22 December		●	●	●				details
4	(Germany) Oberhof	9–12 January		●	●			●	●	details
5	(Germany) Ruhpolding	15–19 January	●			●	●			details
6	(Italy) Antholz-Anterselva	23–26 January		●	●		●			details
WCH	(Switzerland) Lenzerheide	12–23 February	●	●	●	●	●	●	●	World Championships
7	(Czech Republic) Nové Město na Moravě	6–9 March		●	●		●			details
8	(Slovenia) Pokljuka	13–16 March	●			●		●	●	details
9	(Norway) Oslo Holmenkollen	21–23 March		●	●	●				details
Total: 70 (31 men's, 31 women's, 8 mixed)			4	8	7	6	6	4	4	

== Men ==
=== Calendar ===
Key: IND – Individual / SIND – Short Individual / SPR – Sprint / PUR – Pursuit / MSS – Mass Start
No.	Date	Place (In brackets Stage)	Discipline	Winner	Second	Third	R.
1	3 December 2024	(Finland) Kontiolahti (1)	15 km SIND	(Norway) Endre Strømsheim	(Norway) Johannes Thingnes Bø	(Norway) Sturla Holm Lægreid	
2	6 December 2024	(Finland) Kontiolahti (1)	10 km SPR	(France) Émilien Jacquelin	(Sweden) Sebastian Samuelsson	(Germany) Philipp Nawrath	
3	8 December 2024	(Finland) Kontiolahti (1)	15 km MSS	(France) Éric Perrot	(France) Quentin Fillon Maillet	(Norway) Sturla Holm Lægreid	
4	13 December 2024	(Austria) Hochfilzen (2)	10 km SPR	(Norway) Johannes Thingnes Bø	(Norway) Sturla Holm Lægreid	(France) Fabien Claude	
5	14 December 2024	(Austria) Hochfilzen (2)	12.5 km PUR	(Norway) Johannes Thingnes Bø	(France) Émilien Jacquelin	(Norway) Sturla Holm Lægreid	
6	19 December 2024	(France) Annecy–Le Grand-Bornand (3)	10 km SPR	(Norway) Martin Uldal	(Norway) Johannes Thingnes Bø	(Sweden) Sebastian Samuelsson	
7	21 December 2024	(France) Annecy–Le Grand-Bornand (3)	12.5 km PUR	(Norway) Johannes Thingnes Bø	(France) Éric Perrot	(France) Émilien Jacquelin	
8	22 December 2024	(France) Annecy–Le Grand-Bornand (3)	15 km MSS	(Norway) Tarjei Bø	(Germany) Danilo Riethmüller	(Norway) Johannes Thingnes Bø	
9	10 January 2025	(Germany) Oberhof (4)	10 km SPR	(France) Quentin Fillon Maillet	(France) Fabien Claude	(France) Émilien Jacquelin	
10	11 January 2025	(Germany) Oberhof (4)	12.5 km PUR	(Norway) Sturla Holm Lægreid	(Norway) Tarjei Bø	(Norway) Johannes Thingnes Bø	
11	15 January 2025	(Germany) Ruhpolding (5)	20 km IND	(Norway) Vebjørn Sørum	(France) Émilien Claude	(Latvia) Andrejs Rastorgujevs	
12	19 January 2025	(Germany) Ruhpolding (5)	15 km MSS	(Italy) Tommaso Giacomel	(Norway) Sturla Holm Lægreid	(Norway) Johannes Thingnes Bø	
13	24 January 2025	(Italy) Antholz-Anterselva (6)	10 km SPR	(Norway) Tarjei Bø	(Norway) Sturla Holm Lægreid	(Italy) Tommaso Giacomel	
14	26 January 2025	(Italy) Antholz-Anterselva (6)	12.5 km PUR	(Norway) Sturla Holm Lægreid	(Norway) Tarjei Bø	(Italy) Tommaso Giacomel	
Biathlon World Championships 2025 (12–23 February) (Note: Biathlon World Championships are included in the World Cup calendar, but their results do not contribute to the overall World Cup standings, with the exception of the Nations Cup.)
—	15 February 2025	(Switzerland) Lenzerheide (WCH)	10 km SPR	(gold) (Norway) Johannes Thingnes Bø	(silver) (United States) Campbell Wright	(bronze) (France) Quentin Fillon Maillet	
—	16 February 2025	(Switzerland) Lenzerheide (WCH)	12.5 km PUR	(gold) (Norway) Johannes Thingnes Bø	(silver) (United States) Campbell Wright	(bronze) (France) Éric Perrot	
—	19 February 2025	(Switzerland) Lenzerheide (WCH)	20 km IND	(gold) (France) Éric Perrot	(silver) (Italy) Tommaso Giacomel	(bronze) (France) Quentin Fillon Maillet	
—	23 February 2025	(Switzerland) Lenzerheide (WCH)	15 km MSS	(gold) (Norway) Endre Strømsheim	(silver) (Norway) Sturla Holm Lægreid	(bronze) (Norway) Johannes Thingnes Bø	
15	6 March 2025	(Czech Republic) Nové Město na Moravě (7)	10 km SPR	(France) Émilien Jacquelin	(Italy) Tommaso Giacomel	(Norway) Johannes Thingnes Bø	
16	8 March 2025	(Czech Republic) Nové Město na Moravě (7)	12.5 km PUR	(Sweden) Sebastian Samuelsson	(Italy) Tommaso Giacomel	(Norway) Johannes Thingnes Bø	
17	13 March 2025	(Slovenia) Pokljuka (8)	15 km SIND	(Slovenia) Jakov Fak	(Norway) Sturla Holm Lægreid	(Sweden) Martin Ponsiluoma	
18	15 March 2025	(Slovenia) Pokljuka (8)	15 km MSS	(France) Éric Perrot	(France) Quentin Fillon Maillet	(Norway) Sturla Holm Lægreid	
19	21 March 2025	(Norway) Oslo Holmenkollen (9)	10 km SPR	(Norway) Johannes Thingnes Bø	(Norway) Sturla Holm Lægreid	(Norway) Johannes Dale-Skjevdal	
20	22 March 2025	(Norway) Oslo Holmenkollen (9)	12.5 km PUR	(Norway) Sturla Holm Lægreid	(Norway) Johannes Thingnes Bø	(France) Quentin Fillon Maillet	
21	23 March 2025	(Norway) Oslo Holmenkollen (9)	15 km MSS	(Sweden) Sebastian Samuelsson	(France) Éric Perrot	(Norway) Endre Strømsheim	
48th Biathlon World Cup Overall (3 December 2024 – 23 March 2025)				(Norway) Sturla Holm Lægreid	(Norway) Johannes Thingnes Bø	(France) Éric Perrot	

=== Relay – 4 x 7.5 km ===
No.	Date	Place (In brackets Stage)	Winner	Second	Third	Leader (After competition)	R.
1	1 December 2024	(Finland) Kontiolahti (1)	France: 1. Fabien Claude; 2. Quentin Fillon Maillet; 3. Éric Perrot; 4. Émilien Jacquelin	Norway: 1. Sturla Holm Lægreid; 2. Tarjei Bø; 3. Endre Strømsheim; 4. Johannes Thingnes Bø	Sweden: 1. Viktor Brandt; 2. Jesper Nelin; 3. Martin Ponsiluoma; 4. Sebastian Samuelsson	France	
2	15 December 2024	(Austria) Hochfilzen (2)	France: 1. Fabien Claude; 2. Quentin Fillon Maillet; 3. Éric Perrot; 4. Émilien Jacquelin	Norway: 1. Sturla Holm Lægreid; 2. Tarjei Bø; 3. Johannes Thingnes Bø; 4. Vebjørn Sørum	Sweden: 1. Viktor Brandt; 2. Jesper Nelin; 3. Martin Ponsiluoma; 4. Sebastian Samuelsson	France	
3	17 January 2025	(Germany) Ruhpolding (5)	France: 1. Émilien Claude; 2. Fabien Claude; 3. Quentin Fillon Maillet; 4. Émilien Jacquelin	Sweden: 1. Viktor Brandt; 2. Jesper Nelin; 3. Martin Ponsiluoma; 4. Sebastian Samuelsson	Germany: 1. Justus Strelow; 2. Danilo Riethmüller; 3. Johannes Kühn; 4. Philipp Nawrath	France	
4	25 January 2025	(Italy) Antholz-Anterselva (6)	France: 1. Fabien Claude; 2. Quentin Fillon Maillet; 3. Éric Perrot; 4. Émilien Jacquelin	Norway: 1. Sturla Holm Lægreid; 2. Tarjei Bø; 3. Johannes Thingnes Bø; 4. Vetle Sjåstad Christiansen	Sweden: 1. Viktor Brandt; 2. Jesper Nelin; 3. Martin Ponsiluoma; 4. Sebastian Samuelsson	France	
—	22 February 2025	(Switzerland) Lenzerheide (WCH)	(gold) Norway: 1. Endre Strømsheim; 2. Tarjei Bø; 3. Sturla Holm Lægreid; 4. Johannes Thingnes Bø	(silver) France: 1. Émilien Claude; 2. Fabien Claude; 3. Éric Perrot; 4. Quentin Fillon Maillet	(bronze) Germany: 1. Philipp Nawrath; 2. Danilo Riethmüller; 3. Johannes Kühn; 4. Philipp Horn	not included in the World Cup	
5	9 March 2025	(Czech Republic) Nové Město na Moravě (7)	France: 1. Émilien Claude; 2. Oscar Lombardot; 3. Fabien Claude; 4. Quentin Fillon Maillet	Norway: 1. Martin Uldal; 2. Tarjei Bø; 3. Sturla Holm Lægreid; 4. Johannes Thingnes Bø	Ukraine: 1. Artem Tyshchenko; 2. Vitalii Mandzyn; 3. Anton Dudchenko; 4. Dmytro Pidruchnyi	France	

=== Overall leaders ===
Holder	Date	Place(s)	Number of competitions
Individual
(Norway) Endre Strømsheim	3 December 2024	(Finland) Kontiolahti	1
(Norway) Johannes Thingnes Bø (1)	6 December 2024	(Finland) Kontiolahti	1
(France) Éric Perrot	8 December 2024	(Finland) Kontiolahti	1
(Norway) Johannes Thingnes Bø (2)	13 December 2024 – 19 January 2025	(Austria) Hochfilzen – (Germany) Ruhpolding	9
(Norway) Sturla Holm Lægreid	24 January 2025 – 6 March 2025	(Italy) Antholz-Anterselva – (Czech Republic) Nové Město na Moravě	3
(Norway) Johannes Thingnes Bø (3)	8 March 2025	(Czech Republic) Nové Město na Moravě	1
(Norway) Sturla Holm Lægreid (2)	13 March 2025 – 23 March 2025	(Slovenia) Pokljuka – (Norway) Oslo Holmenkollen	5
Under 23
(Ukraine) Vitalii Mandzyn	3 December 2024 – 8 December 2024	(Finland) Kontiolahti	3
(United States) Campbell Wright	13 December 2024 – 23 March 2025	(Austria) Hochfilzen – (Norway) Oslo Holmenkollen	18

=== Standings ===
==== Overall ====
Rank	final standings after 21 events	Points
	(Norway) Sturla Holm Lægreid	1291
2	(Norway) Johannes Thingnes Bø	1173
3	(France) Éric Perrot	926
4	(Sweden) Sebastian Samuelsson	875
5	(France) Quentin Fillon Maillet	862
6	(Italy) Tommaso Giacomel	827
7	(France) Émilien Jacquelin	777
8	(Norway) Tarjei Bø	679
9	(Norway) Vebjørn Sørum	651
10	(Slovenia) Jakov Fak	618

==== Under 23 ====
Rank	final standings after 21 events	Points
	(United States) Campbell Wright	455
2	(Ukraine) Vitalii Mandzyn	230
3	(Norway) Isak Frey	193
4	(Poland) Jan Guńka	44
5	(Poland) Fabian Suchodolski	18
6	(Poland) Konrad Badacz	17
7	(Austria) Fabian Müllauer	10
8	(Finland) Arttu Heikkinen	8
9	(Finland) Jimi Klemettinen	7
10	(Czech Republic) Petr Hák	6

==== Individual ====
Rank	final standings after 3 events	Points
	(Norway) Sturla Holm Lægreid	165
2	(Slovenia) Jakov Fak	144
3	(Norway) Endre Strømsheim	142
4	(France) Quentin Fillon Maillet	112
5	(France) Éric Perrot	111

==== Sprint ====
Rank	final standings after 7 events	Points
	(Norway) Johannes Thingnes Bø	432
2	(Norway) Sturla Holm Lægreid	381
3	(France) Émilien Jacquelin	325
4	(Norway) Martin Uldal	284
5	(Italy) Tommaso Giacomel	279

==== Pursuit ====
Rank	final standings after 6 events	Points
	(Norway) Sturla Holm Lægreid	430
2	(Norway) Johannes Thingnes Bø	430
3	(Sweden) Sebastian Samuelsson	290
4	(Italy) Tommaso Giacomel	271
5	(France) Éric Perrot	251

==== Mass start ====
Rank	final standings after 5 events	Points
	(Norway) Sturla Holm Lægreid	315
2	(France) Éric Perrot	314
3	(France) Quentin Fillon Maillet	268
4	(Sweden) Sebastian Samuelsson	236
5	(Norway) Tarjei Bø	209

==== Relay ====
Rank	final standings after 5 events	Points
1	France	450
2	Norway	355
3	Sweden	311
4	Germany	266
5	Ukraine	217

==== Nations Cup ====
Rank	final standings after 26 events	Points
1	France	9002
2	Norway	8842
3	Sweden	7862
4	Germany	7689
5	Italy	6776

== Women ==
=== Calendar ===
Key: IND – Individual / SIND – Short Individual / SPR – Sprint / PUR – Pursuit / MSS – Mass Start
No.	Date	Place (In brackets Stage)	Discipline	Winner	Second	Third	R.
1	4 December 2024	(Finland) Kontiolahti (1)	12.5 km SIND	(France) Lou Jeanmonnot	(Sweden) Ella Halvarsson	(Sweden) Elvira Öberg	
2	7 December 2024	(Finland) Kontiolahti (1)	7.5 km SPR	(Czech Republic) Markéta Davidová	(Sweden) Elvira Öberg	(Finland) Suvi Minkkinen	
3	8 December 2024	(Finland) Kontiolahti (1)	12.5 km MSS	(Sweden) Elvira Öberg	(France) Julia Simon	(Germany) Franziska Preuß	
4	13 December 2024	(Austria) Hochfilzen (2)	7.5 km SPR	(Germany) Franziska Preuß	(France) Sophie Chauveau	(Norway) Karoline Offigstad Knotten	
5	14 December 2024	(Austria) Hochfilzen (2)	10 km PUR	(France) Lou Jeanmonnot	(Germany) Vanessa Voigt	(Germany) Franziska Preuß	
6	20 December 2024	(France) Annecy–Le Grand-Bornand (3)	7.5 km SPR	(France) Justine Braisaz-Bouchet	(Germany) Franziska Preuß	(Slovenia) Anamarija Lampič	
7	21 December 2024	(France) Annecy–Le Grand-Bornand (3)	10 km PUR	(Germany) Franziska Preuß	(France) Julia Simon	(Germany) Vanessa Voigt	
8	22 December 2024	(France) Annecy–Le Grand-Bornand (3)	12.5 km MSS	(Germany) Selina Grotian	(Germany) Franziska Preuß	(Slovakia) Paulína Bátovská Fialková	
9	9 January 2025	(Germany) Oberhof (4)	7.5 km SPR	(France) Paula Botet	(Norway) Maren Kirkeeide	(Bulgaria) Milena Todorova	
10	11 January 2025	(Germany) Oberhof (4)	10 km PUR	(France) Lou Jeanmonnot	(Norway) Maren Kirkeeide	(Sweden) Elvira Öberg	
11	16 January 2025	(Germany) Ruhpolding (5)	15 km IND	(France) Lou Jeanmonnot	(Germany) Franziska Preuß	(Switzerland) Amy Baserga	
12	19 January 2025	(Germany) Ruhpolding (5)	12.5 km MSS	(Sweden) Elvira Öberg	(Germany) Franziska Preuß	(France) Jeanne Richard	
13	23 January 2025	(Italy) Antholz-Anterselva (6)	7.5 km SPR	(France) Lou Jeanmonnot	(Germany) Selina Grotian	(Germany) Franziska Preuß	
14	25 January 2025	(Italy) Antholz-Anterselva (6)	10 km PUR	(France) Lou Jeanmonnot	(France) Julia Simon	(Germany) Franziska Preuß	
Biathlon World Championships 2025 (12–23 February)
—	14 February 2025	(Switzerland) Lenzerheide (WCH)	7.5 km SPR	(gold) (France) Justine Braisaz-Bouchet	(silver) (Germany) Franziska Preuß	(bronze) (Finland) Suvi Minkkinen	
—	16 February 2025	(Switzerland) Lenzerheide (WCH)	10 km PUR	(gold) (Germany) Franziska Preuß	(silver) (Sweden) Elvira Öberg	(bronze) (France) Justine Braisaz-Bouchet	
—	18 February 2025	(Switzerland) Lenzerheide (WCH)	15 km IND	(gold) (France) Julia Simon	(silver) (Sweden) Ella Halvarsson	(bronze) (France) Lou Jeanmonnot	
—	23 February 2025	(Switzerland) Lenzerheide (WCH)	12.5 km MSS	(gold) (Sweden) Elvira Öberg	(silver) (France) Océane Michelon	(bronze) (Norway) Maren Kirkeeide	
15	7 March 2025	(Czech Republic) Nové Město na Moravě (7)	7.5 km SPR	(Norway) Ingrid Landmark Tandrevold	(France) Justine Braisaz-Bouchet	(France) Julia Simon	
16	8 March 2025	(Czech Republic) Nové Město na Moravě (7)	10 km PUR	(France) Julia Simon	(Sweden) Hanna Öberg	(France) Océane Michelon	
17	13 March 2025	(Slovenia) Pokljuka (8)	12.5 km SIND	(France) Julia Simon	(Sweden) Hanna Öberg	(Germany) Franziska Preuß	
18	15 March 2025	(Slovenia) Pokljuka (8)	12.5 km MSS	(France) Lou Jeanmonnot	(Bulgaria) Milena Todorova	(Slovenia) Anamarija Lampič	
19	21 March 2025	(Norway) Oslo Holmenkollen (9)	7.5 km SPR	(Germany) Franziska Preuß	(France) Lou Jeanmonnot	(Finland) Suvi Minkkinen	
20	22 March 2025	(Norway) Oslo Holmenkollen (9)	10 km PUR	(France) Lou Jeanmonnot	(Sweden) Elvira Öberg	(Switzerland) Lena Häcki-Groß	
21	23 March 2025	(Norway) Oslo Holmenkollen (9)	12.5 km MSS	(Germany) Franziska Preuß	(Sweden) Elvira Öberg	(France) Lou Jeanmonnot	
43rd Biathlon World Cup Overall (4 December 2024 – 23 March 2025)				(Germany) Franziska Preuß	(France) Lou Jeanmonnot	(France) Julia Simon	

=== Relay – 4 x 6 km ===
No.	Date	Place (In brackets Stage)	Winner	Second	Third	Leader (After competition)	R.
1	1 December 2024	(Finland) Kontiolahti (1)	Sweden: 1. Anna Magnusson; 2. Sara Andersson; 3. Hanna Öberg; 4. Elvira Öberg	France: 1. Lou Jeanmonnot; 2. Justine Braisaz-Bouchet; 3. Sophie Chauveau; 4. Julia Simon	Norway: 1. Juni Arnekleiv; 2. Karoline Offigstad Knotten; 3. Maren Kirkeeide; 4. Ingrid Landmark Tandrevold	Sweden	
2	15 December 2024	(Austria) Hochfilzen (2)	Germany: 1. Vanessa Voigt; 2. Julia Tannheimer; 3. Selina Grotian; 4. Franziska Preuß	France: 1. Julia Simon; 2. Justine Braisaz-Bouchet; 3. Sophie Chauveau; 4. Lou Jeanmonnot	Sweden: 1. Anna Magnusson; 2. Anna-Karin Heijdenberg; 3. Ella Halvarsson; 4. Elvira Öberg	Sweden	
3	18 January 2025	(Germany) Ruhpolding (5)	Germany: 1. Stefanie Scherer; 2. Selina Grotian; 3. Sophia Schneider; 4. Franziska Preuß	Norway: 1. Karoline Offigstad Knotten; 2. Juni Arnekleiv; 3. Maren Kirkeeide; 4. Ragnhild Femsteinevik	France: 1. Paula Botet; 2. Océane Michelon; 3. Justine Braisaz-Bouchet; 4. Julia Simon	Germany	
4	26 January 2025	(Italy) Antholz-Anterselva (6)	Sweden: 1. Johanna Skottheim; 2. Ella Halvarsson; 3. Anna Magnusson; 4. Hanna Öberg	Norway: 1. Karoline Offigstad Knotten; 2. Ragnhild Femsteinevik; 3. Maren Kirkeeide; 4. Ingrid Landmark Tandrevold	France: 1. Jeanne Richard; 2. Lou Jeanmonnot; 3. Océane Michelon; 4. Julia Simon	Sweden	
—	22 February 2025	(Switzerland) Lenzerheide (WCH)	(gold) France: 1. Lou Jeanmonnot; 2. Océane Michelon; 3. Justine Braisaz-Bouchet; 4. Julia Simon	(silver) Norway: 1. Karoline Offigstad Knotten; 2. Ingrid Landmark Tandrevold; 3. Ragnhild Femsteinevik; 4. Maren Kirkeeide	(bronze) Sweden: 1. Anna Magnusson; 2. Ella Halvarsson; 3. Hanna Öberg; 4. Elvira Öberg	not included in the World Cup	
5	9 March 2025	(Czech Republic) Nové Město na Moravě (7)	France: 1. Lou Jeanmonnot; 2. Océane Michelon; 3. Justine Braisaz-Bouchet; 4. Julia Simon	Norway: 1. Karoline Offigstad Knotten; 2. Ingrid Landmark Tandrevold; 3. Ragnhild Femsteinevik; 4. Maren Kirkeeide	Germany: 1. Johanna Puff; 2. Julia Tannheimer; 3. Sophia Schneider; 4. Selina Grotian	France	

=== Overall leaders ===
Holder	Date	Place(s)	Number of competitions
Individual
(France) Lou Jeanmonnot (1)	4 December 2024	(Finland) Kontiolahti	1
(Sweden) Elvira Öberg	7 December 2024 – 8 December 2024	(Finland) Kontiolahti	2
(Germany) Franziska Preuß	13 December 2024 – 21 March 2025	(Austria) Hochfilzen – (Norway) Oslo Holmenkollen	16
(France) Lou Jeanmonnot (2)	22 March 2025	(Norway) Oslo Holmenkollen	1
(Germany) Franziska Preuß (2)	23 March 2025	(Norway) Oslo Holmenkollen	1
Under 23
(France) Océane Michelon (1)	4 December 2024 – 7 December 2024	(Finland) Kontiolahti	2
(Sweden) Sara Andersson	8 December 2024	(Finland) Kontiolahti	1
(France) Océane Michelon (2)	13 December 2024 – 14 December 2024	(Austria) Hochfilzen	2
(France) Jeanne Richard	20 December 2024 – 11 January 2025	(France) Annecy–Le Grand-Bornand – (Germany) Oberhof	5
(France) Océane Michelon (3)	16 January 2025	(Germany) Ruhpolding	1
(France) Jeanne Richard (2)	19 January 2025 – 8 March 2025	(Germany) Ruhpolding – (Czech Republic) Nové Město na Moravě	5
(France) Océane Michelon (4)	13 March 2025	(Slovenia) Pokljuka	1
(France) Jeanne Richard (3)	15 March 2025 – 22 March 2025	(Slovenia) Pokljuka – (Norway) Oslo Holmenkollen	3
(France) Océane Michelon (5)	23 March 2025	(Norway) Oslo Holmenkollen	1

=== Standings ===
==== Overall ====
Rank	final standings after 21 events	Points
	(Germany) Franziska Preuß	1278
2	(France) Lou Jeanmonnot	1258
3	(France) Julia Simon	902
4	(Sweden) Elvira Öberg	761
5	(France) Océane Michelon	760
6	(France) Jeanne Richard	755
7	(Finland) Suvi Minkkinen	694
8	(France) Justine Braisaz-Bouchet	657
9	(Germany) Selina Grotian	640
10	(Norway) Maren Kirkeeide	548

==== Under 23 ====
Rank	final standings after 21 events	Points
	(France) Océane Michelon	760
2	(France) Jeanne Richard	755
3	(Germany) Selina Grotian	640
4	(Norway) Maren Kirkeeide	548
5	(Germany) Julia Tannheimer	232
6	(Belgium) Maya Cloetens	203
7	(Sweden) Sara Andersson	199
8	(Italy) Martina Trabucchi	96
9	(Ukraine) Olena Horodna	84
10	(Norway) Gro Randby	76

==== Individual ====
Rank	final standings after 3 events	Points
	(France) Lou Jeanmonnot	221
2	(Germany) Franziska Preuß	190
3	(France) Océane Michelon	146
4	(Sweden) Hanna Öberg	122
5	(France) Julia Simon	120

==== Sprint ====
Rank	final standings after 7 events	Points
	(Germany) Franziska Preuß	414
2	(France) Lou Jeanmonnot	346
3	(France) Justine Braisaz-Bouchet	318
4	(Finland) Suvi Minkkinen	271
5	(France) Julia Simon	259

==== Pursuit ====
Rank	final standings after 6 events	Points
	(France) Lou Jeanmonnot	438
2	(France) Julia Simon	343
3	(Germany) Franziska Preuß	319
4	(France) Jeanne Richard	245
5	(France) Océane Michelon	238

==== Mass start ====
Rank	final standings after 5 events	Points
	(Germany) Franziska Preuß	355
2	(Sweden) Elvira Öberg	299
3	(France) Lou Jeanmonnot	253
4	(France) Jeanne Richard	230
5	(France) Océane Michelon	181

==== Relay ====
Rank	final standings after 5 events	Points
1	France	370
2	Sweden	340
3	Norway	335
4	Germany	323
5	Switzerland	244

==== Nations Cup ====
Rank	final standings after 26 events	Points
1	France	9060
2	Sweden	8146
3	Germany	8051
4	Norway	7967
5	Switzerland	7066

== Mixed Relay ==
No.	Date	Place (In brackets Stage)	Winner	Second	Third	Leader (After competition)	R.
Single Mixed Relay – 6 km + 7.5 km
1	30 November 2024	(Finland) Kontiolahti (1)	Sweden: 1. Ella Halvarsson; 2. Sebastian Samuelsson	France: 1. Julia Simon; 2. Quentin Fillon Maillet	Germany: 1. Vanessa Voigt; 2. Justus Strelow	Sweden	
3	12 January 2025	(Germany) Oberhof (4)	Finland: 1. Tero Seppälä; 2. Suvi Minkkinen	France: 1. Quentin Fillon Maillet; 2. Paula Botet	Germany: 1. Justus Strelow; 2. Selina Grotian	France	
—	20 February 2025	(Switzerland) Lenzerheide (WCH)	(gold) France: 1. Julia Simon; 2. Quentin Fillon Maillet	(silver) Norway: 1. Ragnhild Femsteinevik; 2. Johannes Thingnes Bø	(bronze) Germany: 1. Franziska Preuß; 2. Justus Strelow	not included in the World Cup	
5	16 March 2025	(Slovenia) Pokljuka (8)	Switzerland: 1. Aita Gasparin; 2. Niklas Hartweg	Sweden: 1. Johanna Skottheim; 2. Jesper Nelin	Finland: 1. Suvi Minkkinen; 2. Tero Seppälä	France	
Mixed Relay – 4 x 6 km
2	30 November 2024	(Finland) Kontiolahti (1)	Norway: 1. Karoline Offigstad Knotten; 2. Ingrid Landmark Tandrevold; 3. Johannes Dale-Skjevdal; 4. Vebjørn Sørum	France: 1. Lou Jeanmonnot; 2. Justine Braisaz-Bouchet; 3. Éric Perrot; 4. Émilien Jacquelin	Sweden: 1. Anna Magnusson; 2. Elvira Öberg; 3. Jesper Nelin; 4. Martin Ponsiluoma	Sweden	
4	12 January 2025	(Germany) Oberhof (4)	Sweden: 1. Sebastian Samuelsson; 2. Martin Ponsiluoma; 3. Hanna Öberg; 4. Elvira Öberg	France: 1. Fabien Claude; 2. Éric Perrot; 3. Jeanne Richard; 4. Lou Jeanmonnot	Norway: 1. Sturla Holm Lægreid; 2. Tarjei Bø; 3. Ingrid Landmark Tandrevold; 4. Maren Kirkeeide	France	
—	12 February 2025	(Switzerland) Lenzerheide (WCH)	(gold) France: 1. Julia Simon; 2. Lou Jeanmonnot; 3. Éric Perrot; 4. Émilien Jacquelin	(silver) Czech Republic: 1. Jessica Jislová; 2. Tereza Voborníková; 3. Vítězslav Hornig; 4. Michal Krčmář	(bronze) Germany: 1. Selina Grotian; 2. Franziska Preuß; 3. Philipp Nawrath; 4. Justus Strelow	not included in the World Cup	
6	16 March 2025	(Slovenia) Pokljuka (8)	Sweden: 1. Anna-Karin Heijdenberg; 2. Hanna Öberg; 3. Martin Ponsiluoma; 4. Sebastian Samuelsson	France: 1. Jeanne Richard; 2. Océane Michelon; 3. Éric Perrot; 4. Quentin Fillon Maillet	Norway: 1. Maren Kirkeeide; 2. Ida Lien; 3. Johannes Dale-Skjevdal; 4. Isak Frey	Sweden	

=== Standings ===
Rank	final standings after 6 events	Points
1	Sweden	439
2	France	430
3	Norway	341
4	Germany	325
5	Switzerland	311

== Podium table by nation ==
Table showing the World Cup podium places (gold–1st place, silver–2nd place, bronze–3rd place) by the countries represented by the athletes.

Rank	Nation	Gold	Silver	Bronze	Total
1	France	23	20	10	53
2	Norway	14	19	15	48
3	Sweden	9	9	9	27
4	Germany	7	7	11	25
5	Italy	1	2	2	5
6	Finland	1	0	3	4
7	Slovenia	1	0	2	3
7	Switzerland	1	0	2	3
9	Czech Republic	1	0	0	1
10	Bulgaria	0	1	1	2
11	Latvia	0	0	1	1
11	Slovakia	0	0	1	1
11	Ukraine	0	0	1	1
Totals (13 entries)		58	58	58	174

== Points distribution ==
The table shows the number of points won in the 2024–25 Biathlon World Cup for men and women. Relay events do not impact individual rankings.

Place	1	2	3	4	5	6	7	8	9	10	11	12	13	14	15	16	17	18	19	20	21	22	23	24	25	26	27	28	29	30	31	32	33	34	35	36	37	38	39	40
Individual	90	75	65	55	50	45	41	37	34	31	30	29	28	27	26	25	24	23	22	21	20	19	18	17	16	15	14	13	12	11	10	9	8	7	6	5	4	3	2	1
Sprint	90	75	65	55	50	45	41	37	34	31	30	29	28	27	26	25	24	23	22	21	20	19	18	17	16	15	14	13	12	11	10	9	8	7	6	5	4	3	2	1
Pursuit	90	75	65	55	50	45	41	37	34	31	30	29	28	27	26	25	24	23	22	21	20	19	18	17	16	15	14	13	12	11	10	9	8	7	6	5	4	3	2	1
Mass Start	90	75	65	55	50	45	41	37	34	31	30	29	28	27	26	25	24	23	22	21	20	18	16	14	12	10	8	6	4	2

== Achievements ==
First World Cup career victory

Men

- (Norway) Martin Uldal (23), in his 2nd season – Sprint in Annecy–Le Grand-Bornand
- (Norway) Vebjørn Sørum (26), in his 3rd season – Individual in Ruhpolding
- (Italy) Tommaso Giacomel (24), in his 6th season – Mass Start in Ruhpolding

Women

- (Germany) Selina Grotian (20), in her 3rd season – Mass Start in Annecy–Le Grand-Bornand
- (France) Paula Botet (24), in her 3rd season – Sprint in Oberhof

Team

- Finland – Single Mixed Relay in Oberhof (Note: First victory in Mixed Relay events)
- Switzerland – Single Mixed Relay in Pokljuka

First World Cup podium

Men

- (Norway) Martin Uldal (23), in his 2nd season – Sprint in Annecy–Le Grand-Bornand – 1st place
- (Germany) Danilo Riethmüller (25), in his 2nd season – Mass Start in Annecy–Le Grand-Bornand – 2nd place
- (France) Émilien Claude (25), in his 5th season – Individual in Ruhpolding – 2nd place

Women

- (Germany) Selina Grotian (20), in her 3rd season – Mass Start in Annecy–Le Grand-Bornand – 1st place
- (France) Paula Botet (24), in her 3rd season – Sprint in Oberhof – 1st place
- (Sweden) Ella Halvarsson (25), in her 2nd season – Short Individual in Kontiolahti – 2nd place
- (Norway) Maren Kirkeeide (21), in her 3rd season – Sprint in Oberhof – 2nd place
- (Finland) Suvi Minkkinen (29), in her 8th season – Sprint in Kontiolahti – 3rd place
- (Slovenia) Anamarija Lampič (29), in her 3rd season – Sprint in Annecy–Le Grand-Bornand – 3rd place
- (Bulgaria) Milena Todorova (26), in her 7th season – Sprint in Oberhof – 3rd place
- (Switzerland) Amy Baserga (24), in her 5th season – Individual in Ruhpolding – 3rd place
- (France) Jeanne Richard (22), in her 2nd season – Mass Start in Ruhpolding – 3rd place
- (France) Océane Michelon (23), in her 2nd season – Pursuit in Nové Město na Moravě – 3rd place

Team

Number of wins this season (in brackets are all-time wins)

Men

- (Norway) Johannes Thingnes Bø – 4 (80)
- (Norway) Sturla Holm Lægreid – 3 (15)
- (Norway) Tarjei Bø – 2 (15)
- (Sweden) Sebastian Samuelsson – 2 (6)
- (France) Émilien Jacquelin – 2 (5)
- (France) Éric Perrot – 2 (3)
- (France) Quentin Fillon Maillet – 1 (15)
- (Slovenia) Jakov Fak – 1 (9)
- (Norway) Endre Strømsheim – 1 (2)
- (Norway) Martin Uldal – 1 (1)
- (Norway) Vebjørn Sørum – 1 (1)
- (Italy) Tommaso Giacomel – 1 (1)

Women

- (France) Lou Jeanmonnot – 8 (12)
- (Germany) Franziska Preuß – 4 (5)
- (France) Julia Simon – 2 (11)
- (Sweden) Elvira Öberg – 2 (10)
- (France) Justine Braisaz-Bouchet – 1 (10)
- (Norway) Ingrid Landmark Tandrevold – 1 (5)
- (Czech Republic) Markéta Davidová – 1 (4)
- (Germany) Selina Grotian – 1 (1)
- (France) Paula Botet – 1 (1)

== Retirements ==
The following notable biathletes, who competed in the World Cup, are expected to retire during or after the 2024–25 season:

Men

- (Belarus) Dmitriy Abashev
- (Norway) Filip Fjeld Andersen
- (Norway) Johannes Thingnes Bø
- (Norway) Tarjei Bø
- (Slovenia) Alex Cisar
- (Estonia) Robert Heldna
- (Austria) Felix Leitner
- (Ukraine) Ruslan Tkalenko

Women

- (Russia) Tatiana Akimova
- (France) Chloé Chevalier
- (France) Caroline Colombo
- (Switzerland) Elisa Gasparin
- (Moldova) Alla Ghilenko
- (Sweden) Tilda Johansson
- (Russia) Valeriia Kayumova
- (Canada) Emma Lunder
- (Ukraine) Iryna Petrenko
- (Ukraine) Olena Pidhrushna
- (Ukraine) Valentyna Semerenko
- (Ukraine) Vita Semerenko
- (Russia) Kristina Tokareva
- (Kazakhstan) Galina Vishnevskaya-Sheporenko
- (Germany) Marion Wiesensarter

== See also ==
- 2024–25 Biathlon IBU Cup (as the second highest competition series of IBU).
- 2025 Biathlon World Championships
- 2025 IBU Open European Championships
- 2025 IBU Junior World Championships
- 2025 IBU Junior Open European Championships
