= Fabien Claude =

French biathlete (born 1994)

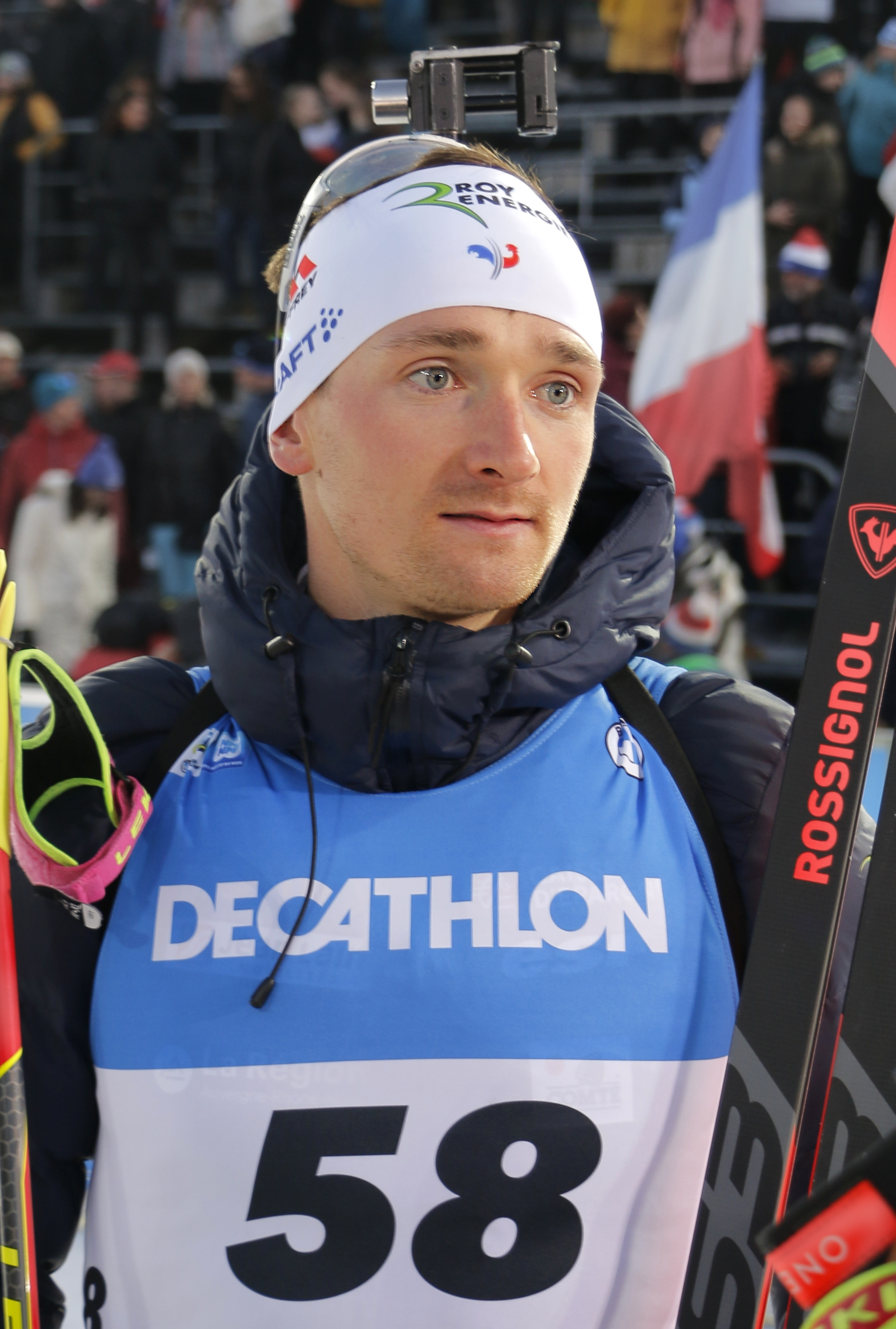
- Fabian Claude in 2023

Personal information
- Born: 22 December 1994 (age 31) Épinal, France
- Height: 1.80 m (5 ft 11 in)
- Weight: 77 kg (170 lb)

Sport

Professional information
- Sport: Biathlon
- Club: Basse sur le rupt ski nordique
- Skis: Fischer
- World Cup debut: 2016

Olympic Games
- Teams: 1 (2022)
- Medals: 1

World Championships
- Teams: 6 (2017, 2020–2025)
- Medals: 3 (1 gold)

World Cup
- Seasons: 9 (2015/16–)
- All victories: 5
Medal record
Men's biathlon
Representing France
Olympic Games
Gold medal – first place	2026 Milano Cortina	4 × 7.5 km relay
Silver medal – second place	2022 Beijing	4 × 7.5 km relay
World Championships
Gold medal – first place	2023 Oberhof	4 × 7.5 km relay
Silver medal – second place	2025 Lenzerheide	4 × 7.5 km relay
Bronze medal – third place	2024 Nové Město	4 × 7.5 km relay
Junior World Championships
Gold medal – first place	2014 Presque Isle	12.5 km pursuit
Silver medal – second place	2014 Presque Isle	4 × 7.5 km relay
Silver medal – second place	2015 Raubichi	10 km sprint
Bronze medal – third place	2015 Raubichi	4 × 7.5 km relay
Youth World Championships
Gold medal – first place	2013 Obertilliach	7.5 km sprint
Bronze medal – third place	2013 Obertilliach	3 × 7.5 km relay

Fabien Claude (born 22 December 1994) is a French biathlete. He is a two-time Olympic medalist in the men's relay event, winning gold in 2026 and silver in 2022.

== Career ==
His first year in biathlon was 2006. He made his international debut in 2011. He won the Junior Men's pursuit and placed 2nd with the French relay team at the Biathlon Junior World Championships 2014. He was part of the French relay team that achieved 3rd place in the relay in Hochfilzen during the 2019–20 season. His first individual podium position was 3rd place in the individual discipline in Pokljuka during the 2019–20 season. His second podium was 2nd place in the pursuit in Kontiolahti during the 2020–21 season.

== Personal life ==
His brothers Florent Claude and Emilien Claude are also biathletes. Their father Gilles Claude died by drowning in Lac Saint-Jean during a guided snowmobiling tour across a channel when the ice broke beneath the tourists in 2020. Fabien dedicated his first world cup podium to his father, saying through tears, ""This podium is for him. I am sure he is proud of us and I am proud of what I have done today".

== Biathlon results ==
All results are sourced from the International Biathlon Union.

=== Olympic Games ===
2 medals (1 gold, 1 silver)

Event	Individual	Sprint	Pursuit	Mass start	Relay	Mixed relay
(China) 2022 Beijing	9th	21st	16th	26th	Silver	—
(Italy) 2026 Milano Cortina	17th	41st	24th	27th	Gold	—

=== World Championships ===
2 medals (1 gold, 1 silver, 1 bronze)

Event	Individual	Sprint	Pursuit	Mass start	Relay	Mixed relay	Single mixed relay
(Austria) 2017 Hochfilzen	25th	—	—	—	—	—	—N/a
(Italy) 2020 Antholz-Anterselva	19th	—	—	—	—	—	—
(Slovenia) 2021 Pokljuka	40th	40th	11th	—	—	—	—
(Germany) 2023 Oberhof	37th	16th	21st	8th	Gold	—	5th
(Czech Republic) 2024 Nové Město	41st	26th	10th	5th	Bronze	—	—
(Switzerland) 2025 Lenzerheide	21st	8th	16th	15th	Silver	—	—

*The single mixed relay was added as an event in 2019.

=== World Cup ===
World Cup rankings

Season	Overall	Individual	Sprint	Pursuit	Mass start
2015–16	—	—	—	—	—
2016–17	55th	44th	92nd	47th	—
2017–18	85th	—	78th	78th	—
2018–19	47th	—	44th	46th	34th
2019–20	19th	5th	23rd	14th	29th
2020–21	19th	—	17th	8th	23rd
2021–22	14th	5th	26th	17th	18th
2022–23	10th	17th	12th	5th	6th
2023–24	18th	21st	26th	16th	12th
2024–25	12th	14th	11th	15th	9th
2025–26	16th	13th	24th	10th	8th

==== Individual podiums ====
No.	Season	Date	Location	Level	Race	Place
1	2020–21	5 December 2020	(Finland) Kontiolahti	World Cup	Pursuit	2nd
2	2020–21	11 December 2020	(Austria) Hochfilzen	World Cup	Sprint	3rd
3	2024–25	13 December 2024	(Austria) Hochfilzen	World Cup	Sprint	3rd
4	2024–25	10 January 2025	(Germany) Oberhof	World Cup	Sprint	2nd

Relay victories

7 victories

No.	Season	Date	Location	Discipline	Level	Team
1	2020–21	15 January 2021	(Germany) Oberhof	Relay	Biathlon World Cup	Desthieux / Fillon Maillet / Claude / Jacquelin
2	2022–23	8 January 2023	(Slovenia) Pokljuka	Mixed Relay	Biathlon World Cup	Claude / Fillon Maillet / Chevalier / Simon
3	2022–23	18 February 2023	(Germany) Oberhof	Relay	Biathlon World Championships	Guigonnat / Claude / Jacquelin / Fillon Maillet
4	2022–23	5 March 2023	(Czech Republic) Nové Město	Mixed Relay	Biathlon World Cup	Jeanmonnot / Colombo / Perrot / Claude
5	2023–24	3 March 2024	(Norway) Oslo Holmenkollen	Mixed Relay	Biathlon World Cup	Simon / Chauveau / Claude / Fillon Maillet
6	2024–25	1 December 2024	(Finland) Kontiolahti	Relay	Biathlon World Cup	Claude / Fillon Maillet / Perrot / Jacquelin
7	2024–25	15 December 2024	(Austria) Hochfilzen	Relay	Biathlon World Cup	Claude / Fillon Maillet / Perrot / Jacquelin
