= 2024–25 Biathlon World Cup – Stage 6 =

2024–25 Biathlon World Cup Stage

The 2024–25 Biathlon World Cup – Stage 6 was the sixth event of the season and was held in Antholz-Anterselva, Italy, from 20 to 26 January 2025. The event consisted of two individual competitions and two relay races, one by men and one by women. The World Cup leaders after the events in Antholz-Anterselva were Sturla Holm Lægreid for the men and Franziska Preuß for the women. The U-23 World Cup ranking leaders after the events in Antholz-Anterselva were Campbell Wright for the men and Jeanne Richard for the women.

== Stage overview ==
Juni Arnekleiv and Johannes Dale-Skjevdal have been excluded from the Norwegian team for this stage, as the coaching staff does not consider them candidates for the upcoming World Championship. Vetle Sjåstad Christiansen only participated in the men’s relay. Venla Lehtonen is returning to the Finnish women's team after missing the previous stage. Meanwhile, the men's team will be joined by Olli Hiidensalo, who performed successfully in the last IBU Cup stage. Tereza Vinklárková has been called up to the Czech team to fill the full quota, as Markéta Davidová is skipping also Antholz-Anterselva stage.

In the German women’s team, Julia Tannheimer and Vanessa Voigt are skipping the stage, leaving only four German women to compete. Julia Kink, Johanna Puff and Marlene Fichtner were also additionally called up to participate in the relay. In the men’s team, it was initially planned to replace David Zobel and Roman Rees with Simon Kaiser and Philipp Horn. However, after Danilo Riethmüller fell ill and was unable to participate in the races, it was decided to keep Zobel in the main team. In the Austrian team, Fabian Müllauer, who finished second at the IBU Cup stage in Osrblie, will replace Magnus Oberhauser in the main men's squad. In the Italian team, Patrick Braunhofer has been excluded from the squad as part of his preparation for the European Championship.

Sturla Holm Lægreid overtook Johannes Thingnes Bø in the overall World Cup standings and claimed the top position after the sprint race, where Lægreid finished first and Bø placed ninth. For the first time in her career, Ella Halvarsson secured a victory in the women’s relay race.

== Schedule of events ==
The events took place at the following times.

Date	Time	Events
23 January	14:30 CET	Women's 7.5 km Sprint
24 January	14:30 CET	Men's 10 km Sprint
25 January	13:00 CET	Women's 10 km Pursuit
25 January	14:55 CET	4 x 7.5 km Men Relay
26 January	12:05 CET	4 x 5 km Women Relay
26 January	14:45 CET	Men's 12.5 km Pursuit

== Medal winners ==
=== Men ===
Event:	Gold:	Time	Silver:	Time	Bronze:	Time
10 km Sprint	Tarjei Bø; Norway	23:51.0 (0+0)	Sturla Holm Lægreid; Norway	23:51.4 (0+1)	Tommaso Giacomel; Italy	23:53.6 (1+1)
4 x 7.5 km Men Relay	France; Fabien Claude; Quentin Fillon Maillet; Éric Perrot; Émilien Jacquelin	1:13:33.6 (0+1) (0+2) (0+0) (0+0) (0+0) (0+0) (0+1) (0+0)	Norway; Sturla Holm Lægreid; Tarjei Bø; Johannes Thingnes Bø; Vetle Sjåstad Christiansen	1:14:17.2 (0+2) (0+1) (0+1) (0+3) (0+2) (0+1) (0+0) (0+2)	Sweden; Viktor Brandt; Jesper Nelin; Martin Ponsiluoma; Sebastian Samuelsson	1:14:17.6 (0+2) (1+3) (0+0) (0+1) (0+0) (0+2) (0+0) (0+0)
12.5 km Pursuit	Sturla Holm Lægreid; Norway	29:53.0 (0+0+0+0)	Tarjei Bø; Norway	+18.9 (0+0+0+1)	Tommaso Giacomel; Italy	+24.0 (0+1+0+1)

=== Women ===
Event:	Gold:	Time	Silver:	Time	Bronze:	Time
7.5 km Sprint	Lou Jeanmonnot; France	21:09.5 (0+0)	Selina Grotian; Germany	21:16.7 (0+0)	Franziska Preuß; Germany	21:26.2 (0+0)
10 km Pursuit	Lou Jeanmonnot; France	29:44.0 (0+0+0+1)	Julia Simon; France	+24.1 (0+0+0+0)	Franziska Preuß; Germany	+53.6 (1+0+0+0)
4 x 5 km Women Relay	Sweden; Johanna Skottheim; Ella Halvarsson; Anna Magnusson; Hanna Öberg	1:07:26.0 (0+1) (0+0) (0+0) (0+0) (0+0) (0+2) (0+1) (0+2)	Norway; Karoline Offigstad Knotten; Ragnhild Femsteinevik; Maren Kirkeeide; Ingrid Landmark Tandrevold	1:07:39.4 (0+0) (0+0) (0+0) (0+2) (0+1) (0+1) (0+1) (0+2)	France; Jeanne Richard; Lou Jeanmonnot; Océane Michelon; Julia Simon	1:07:49.6 (0+0) (0+2) (0+2) (0+0) (0+2) (0+1) (0+0) (0+1)

== Achievements ==
Best individual performance for all time

Men

- (Czech Republic) Jonáš Mareček (23) reached No. 10 on sprint race
- (Sweden) Viktor Brandt (25) reached No. 18 on pursuit race
- (Sweden) Emil Nykvist (27) reached No. 22 on pursuit race
- (Italy) Daniele Cappellari (27) reached No. 32 on pursuit race
- (Slovakia) Tomáš Sklenárik (25) reached No. 39 on sprint race
- (Austria) Fabian Müllauer (21) reached No. 45 on sprint race
- (Poland) Fabian Suchodolski (20) reached No. 84 on sprint race
- (Bulgaria) Vasil Zashev (22) reached No. 91 on sprint race

Women

- (Ukraine) Olena Horodna (20) reached No. 49 on sprint race
- (Latvia) Elza Bleidele (19) reached No. 74 on sprint race
