= Biathlon World Championships 2025 – Women's sprint =

Women's sprint at the Biathlon World Championships 2025
- Venue: Roland Arena
- Location: Lenzerheide, Switzerland
- Dates: 14 February
- Competitors: 92 from 30 nations
- Winning time: 22:08.7

Medalists
gold medal	Justine Braisaz-Bouchet	France
silver medal	Franziska Preuß	Germany
bronze medal	Suvi Minkkinen	Finland

The Women's sprint competition at the Biathlon World Championships 2025 was held on 14 February 2025.

== Results ==
The race was started at 15:05.

Rank	Bib	Name	Nationality	Penalties (P+S)	Time	Deficit
1st place, gold medalist(s)	68	Justine Braisaz-Bouchet	France	1 (1+0)	22:08.7	
2nd place, silver medalist(s)	46	Franziska Preuß	Germany	1 (0+1)	22:18.5	+9.8
3rd place, bronze medalist(s)	42	Suvi Minkkinen	Finland	0 (0+0)	22:18.7	+10.0
4	34	Lena Häcki-Groß	Switzerland	0 (0+0)	22:20.1	+11.4
5	2	Michela Carrara	Italy	1 (0+1)	22:33.1	+24.4
6	54	Lou Jeanmonnot	France	2 (1+1)	22:39.6	+30.9
7	48	Julia Simon	France	2 (1+1)	22:43.2	+34.5
8	16	Maya Cloetens	Belgium	0 (0+0)	22:59.1	+50.4
9	66	Ella Halvarsson	Sweden	2 (0+2)	23:00.9	+52.2
10	60	Elvira Öberg	Sweden	2 (0+2)	23:02.1	+53.4
11	61	Sophia Schneider	Germany	1 (1+0)	23:04.4	+55.7
12	56	Océane Michelon	France	3 (2+1)	23:04.8	+56.1
13	51	Natalia Sidorowicz	Poland	1 (0+1)	23:05.2	+56.5
14	51	Milena Todorova	Bulgaria	1 (0+1)	23:05.4	+56.7
14	30	Anamarija Lampič	Slovenia	3 (2+1)	23:05.4	+56.7
16	52	Maren Kirkeeide	Norway	3 (3+0)	23:05.5	+56.8
17	24	Julia Tannheimer	Germany	1 (0+1)	23:07.8	+59.1
18	18	Yuliia Dzhima	Ukraine	0 (0+0)	23:08.4	+59.7
19	38	Hanna Öberg	Sweden	2 (0+2)	23:11.5	+1:02.8
20	32	Anna Magnusson	Sweden	2 (0+2)	23:11.8	+1:03.1
21	44	Dorothea Wierer	Italy	2 (0+2)	23:19.3	+1:10.6
22	36	Paulína Bátovská Fialková	Slovakia	2 (1+1)	23:21.3	+1:12.6
23	10	Ingrid Landmark Tandrevold	Norway	2 (1+1)	23:21.5	+1:12.8
24	50	Selina Grotian	Germany	3 (2+1)	23:28.2	+1:19.5
25	43	Emma Lunder	Canada	1 (0+1)	23:35.2	+1:26.5
26	64	Lisa Theresa Hauser	Austria	2 (1+1)	23:39.8	+1:31.1
27	69	Joanna Jakieła	Poland	1 (0+1)	23:44.4	+1:35.7
28	62	Jeanne Richard	France	2 (1+1)	23:46.6	+1:37.9
29	58	Lotte Lie	Belgium	2 (1+1)	23:56.3	+1:47.6
30	17	Polona Klemenčič	Slovenia	2 (1+1)	23:56.7	+1:48.0
31	71	Nadia Moser	Canada	0 (0+0)	23:58.4	+1:49.7
32	7	Tuuli Tomingas	Estonia	2 (0+2)	23:58.7	+1:50.0
33	29	Anastasiya Kuzmina	Slovakia	3 (1+2)	23:59.0	+1:50.3
33	31	Anna Gandler	Austria	2 (1+1)	23:59.0	+1:50.3
35	67	Tamara Steiner	Austria	1 (0+1)	24:12.9	+2:04.2
36	49	Susan Külm	Estonia	2 (1+1)	24:13.3	+2:04.6
37	13	Elisa Gasparin	Switzerland	3 (1+2)	24:16.7	+2:08.0
38	12	Pascale Paradis	Canada	1 (0+1)	24:21.9	+2:13.2
39	72	Lucie Charvátová	Czech Republic	4 (2+2)	24:22.4	+1:47.6
40	27	Lora Hristova	Bulgaria	2 (0+2)	24:22.8	+2:14.1
41	57	Aita Gasparin	Switzerland	4 (2+2)	24:23.2	+2:14.5
42	77	Estere Volfa	Latvia	2 (0+2)	24:24.6	+2:15.9
43	3	Valentina Dimitrova	Bulgaria	2 (1+1)	24:29.3	+2:20.6
44	20	Karoline Offigstad Knotten	Norway	4 (0+4)	24:29.8	+2:21.1
45	1	Anna Mąka	Poland	2 (0+2)	24:35.8	+2:27.1
46	26	Hannah Auchentaller	Italy	3 (1+2)	24:36.4	+2:27.7
47	63	Judita Traubaitė	Lithuania	3 (1+2)	24:36.9	+2:28.2
48	19	Khrystyna Dmytrenko	Ukraine	3 (2+1)	24:37.0	+2:28.3
49	65	Johanna Talihärm	Estonia	3 (2+1)	24:41.5	+2:32.8
50	35	Ragnhild Femsteinevik	Norway	5 (3+2)	24:42.0	+2:33.3
51	41	Regina Ermits	Estonia	3 (3+0)	24:44.5	+2:35.8
52	90	Chloe Levins	United States	1 (1+0)	24:48.3	+2:39.6
53	37	Martina Trabucchi	Italy	2 (1+1)	24:50.8	+2:42.1
54	33	Jessica Jislová	Czech Republic	3 (1+2)	24:52.0	+2:43.3
55	14	Baiba Bendika	Latvia	4 (1+3)	24:53.4	+2:44.7
56	81	Lucinda Anderson	United States	4 (1+3)	24:54.8	+2:46.1
57	25	Eve Bouvard	Belgium	2 (1+1)	24:55.3	+2:46.6
58	4	Anna Andexer	Austria	3 (1+2)	24:56.7	+2:48.0
59	15	Anastasia Tolmacheva	Romania	1 (1+0)	24:56.9	+2:48.2
60	23	Lena Repinc	Slovenia	4 (2+2)	24:58.7	+2:50.0
61	28	Amy Baserga	Switzerland	5 (3+2)	24:58.8	+2:50.1
62	70	Inka Hämäläinen	Finland	4 (3+1)	25:03.2	+2:54.5
63	39	Deedra Irwin	United States	4 (0+4)	25:04.1	+2:55.4
64	78	Margie Freed	United States	4 (2+2)	25:07.3	+2:58.6
65	76	Gaia Brunello	Brazil	0 (0+0)	25:09.9	+3:01.2
66	82	Živa Klemenčič	Slovenia	3 (0+0)	25:15.4	+3:06.7
67	9	Alina Stremous	Moldova	2 (1+1)	25:159 4	+3:07.2
68	45	Kamila Żuk	Poland	4 (3+1)	25:17.2	+3:08.5
69	8	Lidija Žurauskaitė	Lithuania	4 (1+3)	25:18.5	+3:09.8
70	74	Iryna Petrenko	Ukraine	2 (1+1)	25:19.8	+3:11.1
71	22	Tereza Voborníková	Czech Republic	4 (2+2)	25:20.7	+3:12.0
72	92	Ukaleq Slettemark	Greenland	0 (0+0)	25:21.2	+3:12.5
73	55	Sandra Buliņa	Latvia	2 (0+2)	25:30.6	+3:21.9
74	47	Aliona Makarova	Moldova	1 (1+0)	25:37.9	+3:29.2
75	53	Olena Horodna	Ukraine	4 (4+0)	25:43.5	+3:34.8
76	6	Erika Jänkä	Finland	3 (1+2)	25:54.5	+3:45.8
77	84	Shawna Pendry	Great Britain	3 (3+0)	25:54.6	+3:45.9
78	11	Zuzana Remeňová	Slovakia	3 (2+1)	25:59.6	+3:50.9
79	89	Anika Kožica	Croatia	2 (0+2)	26:02.2	+3:53.5
80	5	Darcie Morton	Australia	4 (2+2)	26:17.9	+4:09.2
81	79	Chloe Dupont	Great Britain	1 (0+1)	26:27.4	+4:18.7
82	59	Sonja Leinamo	Finland	7 (4+3)	26:31.5	+4:22.8
83	91	Elza Bleidele	Latvia	4 (2+2)	26:34.5	+4:25.8
84	73	Natalija Kočergina	Lithuania	5 (3+2)	26:34.8	+4:26.1
85	83	Aisha Rakisheva	Kazakhstan	4 (4+0)	26:53.8	+4:45.1
86	85	Galina Vishnevskaya-Sheporenko	Kazakhstan	3 (3+0)	27:10.6	+5:01.9
87	86	Sara Ponya	Hungary	3 (1+2)	27:30.7	+5:22.0
88	80	Andreea Mezdrea	Romania	7 (4+3)	27:39.2	+5:30.5
89	75	Adelina Rîmbeu	Romania	6 (4+2)	28:46.4	+6:37.7
90	88	Alla Ghilenko	Moldova	7 (4+3)	29:37.5	+7:28.8
91	87	Konstantina Charalampidou	Greece	6 (1+5)	29:57.9	+7:49.2
–	21	Kristýna Otcovská	Czech Republic	Did not finish		
