= Biathlon World Championships 2025 – Mixed relay =

Mixed relay at the Biathlon World Championships 2025
- Venue: Roland Arena
- Location: Lenzerheide, Switzerland
- Dates: 12 February
- Competitors: 96 from 24 nations
- Teams: 24
- Winning time: 1:04:41.5

Medalists
gold medal	Julia Simon; Lou Jeanmonnot; Éric Perrot; Émilien Jacquelin	France
silver medal	Jessica Jislová; Tereza Voborníková; Vítězslav Hornig; Michal Krčmář	Czech Republic
bronze medal	Selina Grotian; Franziska Preuß; Philipp Nawrath; Justus Strelow	Germany

The Mixed relay competition at the Biathlon World Championships 2025 was held on 12 February 2025.

== Results ==
The race was started at 14:30.

Rank	Bib	Team	Time	Penalties (P+S)	Deficit
1st place, gold medalist(s)	3	France; 1. Julia Simon; 2. Lou Jeanmonnot; 3. Éric Perrot; 4. Émilien Jacquelin	1:04:41.5; 16:43.8; 17:00.3; 15:02.0; 15:55.4	0+2 1+4; 0+1 0+0; 0+0 0+1; 0+0 0+0; 0+1 1+3	
2nd place, silver medalist(s)	8	Czech Republic; 1. Jessica Jislová; 2. Tereza Voborníková; 3. Vítězslav Hornig; 4. Michal Krčmář	1:05:55.3; 17:00.2; 17:30.5; 15:45.4; 15:39.2	0+3 0+6; 0+0 0+1; 0+2 0+0; 0+0 0+3; 0+1 0+2	+1:13.8
3rd place, bronze medalist(s)	4	Germany; 1. Selina Grotian; 2. Franziska Preuß; 3. Philipp Nawrath; 4. Justus Strelow	1:05:59.9; 17:03.4; 17:35.6; 15:38.4; 15:42.5	0+5 0+6; 0+2 0+2; 0+1 0+1; 0+2 0+3; 0+0 0+0	+1:18.4
4	1	Norway; 1. Ingrid Landmark Tandrevold; 2. Maren Kirkeeide; 3. Sturla Holm Lægreid; 4. Johannes Thingnes Bø	1:06:02.6; 18:55.3; 17:27.2; 15:00.1; 14:40.0	1+4 1+4; 1+3 1+3; 0+1 0+0; 0+0 0+1; 0+0 0+0	+1:21.1
5	2	Sweden; 1. Anna Magnusson; 2. Hanna Öberg; 3. Martin Ponsiluoma; 4. Sebastian Samuelsson	1:06:18.0; 17:47.0; 17:54.3; 15:10.2; 15:26.5	0+4 1+6; 0+3 0+0; 0+0 1+3; 0+1 0+1; 0+0 0+2	+1:36.5
6	6	Switzerland; 1. Amy Baserga; 2. Lena Häcki-Groß; 3. Sebastian Stalder; 4. Niklas Hartweg	1:06:25.6; 17:22.7; 17:38.9; 16:01.4; 15:22.6	0+9 0+2; 0+2 0+0; 0+2 0+2; 0+3 0+0; 0+2 0+0	+1:44.1
7	5	Italy; 1. Hannah Auchentaller; 2. Dorothea Wierer; 3. Lukas Hofer; 4. Tommaso Giacomel	1:07:22.7; 17:03.9; 17:26.7; 15:45.0; 17:07.1	1+8 0+5; 0+1 0+0; 0+1 0+1; 0+3 0+1; 1+3 0+3	+2:41.2
8	7	Ukraine; 1. Iryna Petrenko; 2. Khrystyna Dmytrenko; 3. Anton Dudchenko; 4. Dmytro Pidruchnyi	1:07:31.1; 18:17.8; 18:10.8; 15:38.6; 15:23.9	0+0 0+5; 0+0 0+2; 0+0 0+2; 0+0 0+1; 0+0 0+0	+2:49.6
9	10	Finland; 1. Suvi Minkkinen; 2. Sonja Leinamo; 3. Tero Seppälä; 4. Olli Hiidensalo	1:07:33.8; 16:44.7; 19:45.9; 15:36.6; 15:26.6	1+3 0+1; 0+0 0+0; 1+3 0+1; 0+0 0+0; 0+0 0+0	+2:52.3
10	9	Belgium; 1. Lotte Lie; 2. Maya Cloetens; 3. Thierry Langer; 4. Florent Claude	1:08:01.5; 17:24.6; 17:37.4; 16:44.8; 16:14.7	1+6 0+6; 0+1 0+2; 0+0 0+1; 1+3 0+1; 0+2 0+2	+3:20.0
11	15	Slovenia; 1. Lena Repinc; 2. Anamarija Lampič; 3. Jakov Fak; 4. Lovro Planko	1:08:11.2; 17:38.3; 19:01.5; 15:27.4; 16:04.0	1+4 1+7; 0+1 0+2; 1+3 1+3; 0+0 0+1; 0+0 0+1	+3:29.7
12	16	Slovakia; 1. Paulína Bátovská Fialková; 2. Anastasiya Kuzmina; 3. Tomáš Sklenárik; 4. Artur Iskhakov	1:08:16.8; 17:02.7; 17:47.2; 16:23.0; 17:03.9	0+3 0+5; 0+0 0+2; 0+1 0+0; 0+1 0+1; 0+1 0+2	+3:35.3
13	17	Estonia; 1. Regina Ermits; 2. Susan Külm; 3. Kristo Siimer; 4. Rene Zahkna	1:08:46.9; 17:42.0; 18:59.9; 15:32.3; 16:32.7	0+5 0+5; 0+2 0+1; 0+3 0+0; 0+0 0+1; 0+0 0+3	+4:05.4
14	11	Poland; 1. Natalia Sidorowicz; 2. Kamila Żuk; 3. Konrad Badacz; 4. Jan Guńka	1:08:51.7; 16:58.7; 17:55.3; 16:52.5; 17:05.2	0+5 1+7; 0+0 0+1; 0+0 0+0; 0+3 0+3; 0+2 1+3	+4:10.2
15	13	Bulgaria; 1. Lora Hristova; 2. Milena Todorova; 3. Vladimir Iliev; 4. Blagoy Todev	1:08:58.8; 18:10.8; 18:01.7; 16:05.5; 16:40.8	1+8 0+6; 0+2 0+2; 0+0 0+1; 0+3 0+3; 1+3 0+0	+4:17.3
16	18	Lithuania; 1. Judita Traubaitė; 2. Lidija Žurauskaitė; 3. Maksim Fomin; 4. Vytautas Strolia	1:09:06.7; 17:56.2; 18:38.7; 16:23.6; 16:08.2	0+3 0+2; 0+0 0+0; 0+0 0+1; 0+2 0+1; 0+1 0+0	+4:25.2
17	12	Austria; 1. Tamara Steiner; 2. Anna Gandler; 3. Simon Eder; 4. David Komatz	1:09:33.5; 18:25.0; 17:44.8; 15:58.2; 17:25.5	2+7 0+3; 0+3 0+0; 0+0 0+0; 0+1 0+2; 2+3 0+1	+4:52.0
18	23	Moldova; 1. Alina Stremous; 2. Aliona Makarova; 3. Maksim Makarov; 4. Pavel Magazejev	LAP; 17:19.1; 20:00.5	0+4 0+3; 0+0 0+0; 0+2 0+2; 0+2 0+1	
19	22	United States; 1. Chloe Levins; 2. Deedra Irwin; 3. Maxime Germain; 4. Campbell Wright	LAP; 18:47.6; 18:38.6	0+2 0+2; 0+1 0+1; 0+1 0+1; 0+0 0+0	
20	14	Canada; 1. Pascale Paradis; 2. Emma Lunder; 3. Logan Pletz; 4. Zachary Connelly	LAP; 18:00.9; 19:11.4	1+5 0+7; 0+0 0+1; 0+2 0+3; 1+3 0+3	
21	19	Romania; 1. Anastasia Tolmacheva; 2. Elena Chirkova; 3. Raul Flore; 4. Cornel Puchianu	LAP; 18:57.5	1+3 0+6; 0+0 0+3; 1+3 0+3	
22	21	Latvia; 1. Estere Volfa; 2. Baiba Bendika; 3. Renārs Birkentāls; 4. Edgars Mise	LAP; 20:05.7	2+4 2+5; 0+1 0+2; 2+3 2+3	
23	20	Kazakhstan; 1. Galina Vishnevskaya-Sheporenko; 2. Aisha Rakisheva; 3. Nikita Akimov; 4. Ivan Darin	LAP; 19:28.1	1+5 0+4; 0+2 0+1; 1+3 0+3	
24	24	Great Britain; 1. Shawna Pendry; 2. Chloe Dupont; 3. Matthew Chronicle; 4. Sean Benson	LAP; 18:57.0	1+4 1+5; 0+1 0+2; 1+3 1+3	
