= Maxime Germain =

American biathlete (born 2001)

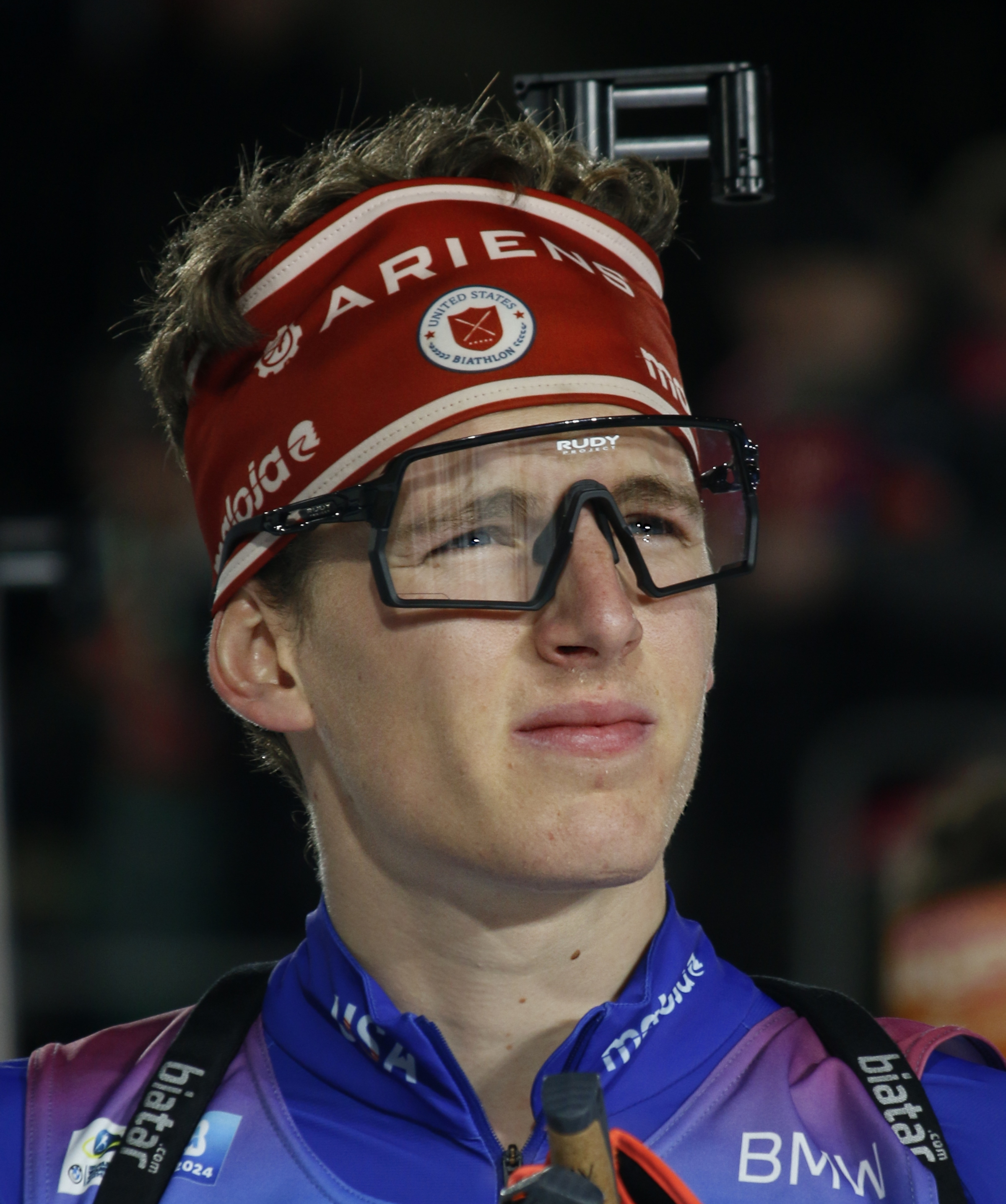
- Germain in 2024

Personal information
- Nationality: American
- Born: August 21, 2001 (age 25) Juneau, Alaska, U.S.

Sport
- Country: United States
- Sport: Biathlon
Medal record
Men's biathlon
Representing United States
Junior World Championships
Bronze medal – third place	2023 Shchuchinsk	10 km sprint
Youth World Championships
Bronze medal – third place	2020 Otepää	7.5 km sprint

Maxime Germain (born August 21, 2001) is an American biathlete. He made his debut in the Biathlon World Cup in 2022.

== Career ==
Maxime Germain was born in Alaska, from French parents, but grew up in Chamonix. He spent his teenage years there, attending school at Cham’centre and Frison-Roche. At the age of 15, after earning his brevet and being accepted into the Mont-Blanc Committee, Germain decided to move to the United States to attend high school.

He made his international debut in February 2018 at the Youth World Championships in Otepää, but he failed to achieve notable results that year or the next, primarily due to poor shooting performances. The American first drew attention at the 2020 Youth World Championships when he won the bronze medal in the sprint, finishing behind Alexei Kovalev and Ondřej Mánek. However, in the subsequent pursuit race, he dropped back to 32nd place after incurring ten penalties.

After nearly two years without international competitions, Germain returned in early January 2022, making his IBU Cup debut in Osrblie, Slovakia. Shortly thereafter, as the U.S. national team was preparing for the Olympics with a training block, he competed in the World Cup in Ruhpolding for the first time. There, he finished 104th in the sprint and 13th with the men's relay team. Germain's next medal came in August of that year, when he earned bronze in the supersprint at the Summer Biathlon Junior World Championships.

At the start of the 2022/23 season, Germain became a regular member of the U.S. World Cup team and made his first pursuit start at this level in Hochfilzen after placing 59th in the sprint. Nonetheless, he returned to the IBU Cup in January, where he surprised with a sixth-place finish in the sprint in Osrblie. Back in the World Cup in Ruhpolding, Germain achieved an impressive result, securing seventh place in the men's relay alongside Paul Schommer, Sean Doherty, and Jake Brown. This was the best finish by a U.S. men's relay team since March 2018. He subsequently competed in both the European and World Championships, achieving strong placements of 15th and 13th in the sprint and pursuit at the European Championships. Germain won his third international medal at the 2023 Junior World Championships, finishing third in the sprint behind his training partner Campbell Wright and Jan Guńka. He closed the season by setting new personal bests in the World Cup at the Oslo finale, finishing 47th and 45th in individual races.

The 2023/24 winter season, however, was less successful for Germain compared to the previous one. Until January, his best result was 61st place. He showed signs of improvement at the European Championships in Osrblie, finishing 10th in the individual event. Later, in late February 2024, he achieved another solid result in the IBU Cup, placing seventh in the sprint in Obertilliach.

In the 2024/25 season, at the first World Cup stage in Kontiolahti, Germain achieved a personal best result by finishing 20th in the short individual race.

== Biathlon results ==
All results are sourced from the International Biathlon Union.

=== Olympic Games ===
0 medal

Event	Individual	Sprint	Pursuit	Mass start	Relay	Mixed relay
(Italy) 2026 Milano Cortina	67th	66th	—	—	5th	14th

=== World Championships ===
Event	Individual	Sprint	Pursuit	Mass start	Relay	Mixed relay
(Germany) 2023 Oberhof	94th	65th	—	—	12th	—
(Czech Republic) 2024 Nové Město	—	63rd	—	—	—	—
(Switzerland) 2025 Lenzerheide	62nd	12th	21st	28th	9th	19th

=== World Cup ===
Season	Overall			Individual		Sprint		Pursuit		Mass start	
Season	Races	Points	Position	Points	Position	Points	Position	Points	Position	Points	Position
2021–22	1/22	Didn't earn World Cup points									
2022–23	6/21	Didn't earn World Cup points									
2023–24	7/21	Didn't earn World Cup points									

==== World Cup Team podiums ====
- No Victories
- 1 podiums (1 Mixed)

No.	Season	Date	Location	Race	Place	Teammate(s)
1	2025-26	15 March 2026	(Estonia) Otepää	Mixed Relay	3rd	Campbell Wright, Deedra Irwin, Margie Freed

=== Youth and Junior World Championships ===
2 medals (2 bronze)

Year	Age	Individual	Sprint	Pursuit	Relay
(Estonia) 2018 Otepää	16	70th	74th	—	—
(Slovakia) 2019 Brezno-Osrblie	17	47th	66th	—	15th
(Switzerland) 2020 Lenzerheide	18	38th	Bronze	32nd	13th
(United States) 2022 Soldier Hollow	20	46th	17th	28th	7th
(Kazakhstan) 2023 Shchuchinsk	21	14th	Bronze	5th	4th
