= Julia Kink =

German biathlete (born 2004)

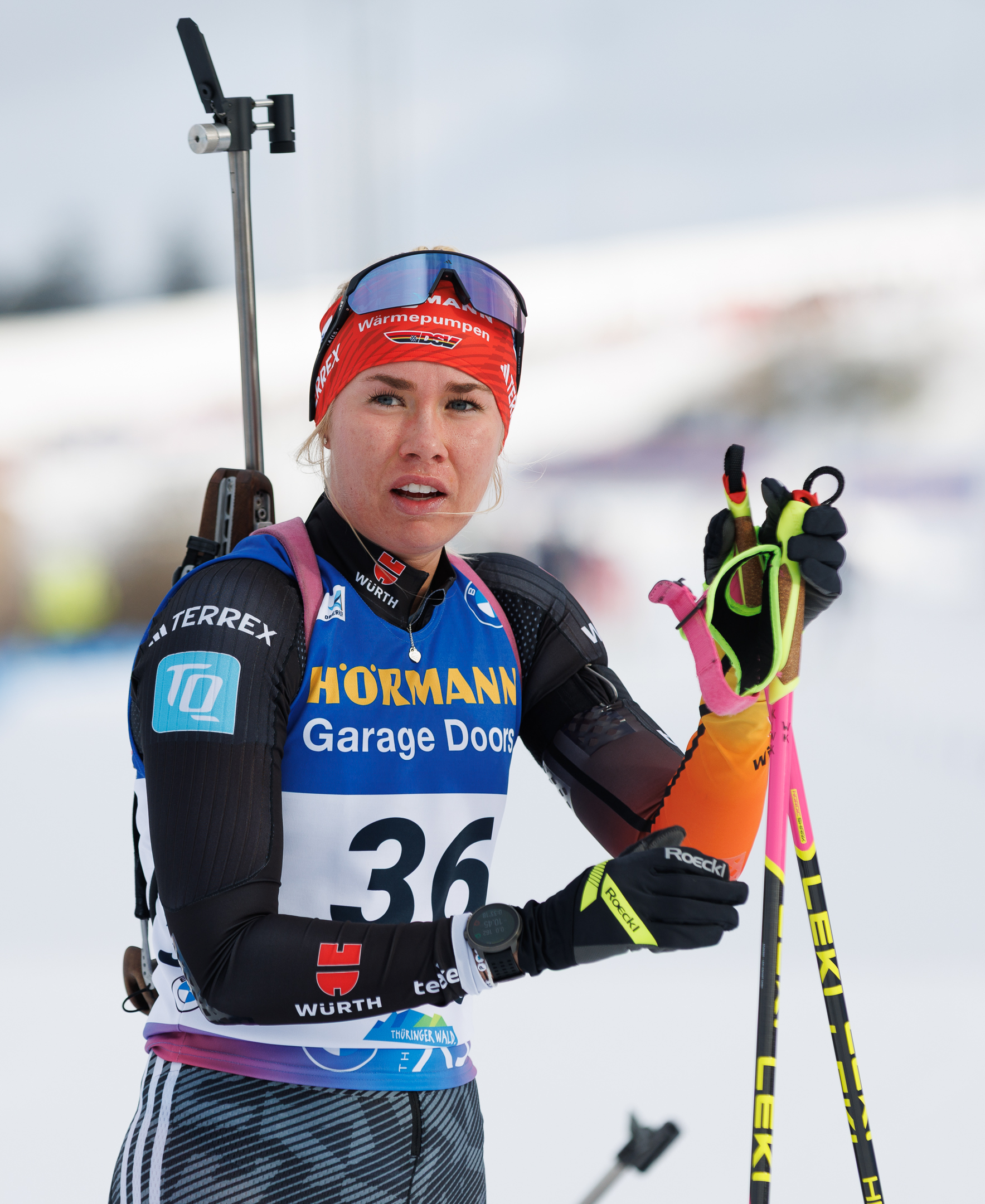
- Kink in 2025

Personal information
- Nationality: German
- Born: 26 January 2004 (age 22) Rosenheim, Germany

Sport

Professional information
- Club: WSV Aschau

World Championships
- Medals: (0 gold)

World Cup
- Seasons: 2024–
- Individual victories: 0
- All victories: 0
- Individual podiums: 0
- All podiums: 1
Medal record
Women's biathlon
Representing Germany
European Championships
Silver medal – second place	2026 Sjusjøen	4 × 6 km relay
Junior World Championships
Gold medal – first place	2024 Otepää	9 km mass start 60
Gold medal – first place	2024 Otepää	4 × 6 km relay
Youth World Championships
Gold medal – first place	2023 Shchuchinsk	10 km individual
Gold medal – first place	2023 Shchuchinsk	3 × 6 km relay
Silver medal – second place	2023 Shchuchinsk	6 km sprint
Silver medal – second place	2023 Shchuchinsk	7.5 km pursuit
Silver medal – second place	2023 Shchuchinsk	Mixed relay

Julia Kink (born 26 January 2004) is a German biathlete. She won multiple medals at youth and junior world championships in 2023 and 2024, respectively. She is a four-time youth and junior world champion and won a race in the IBU Cup in 2024.

== Career ==
Kink made her international debut in March 2022 at the Youth Olympic Festival in Vuokatti. She performed very successfully at the 2023 Youth World Championships in Shchuchinsk: she won the individual, and she was also able to win the women's relay alongside Lea Zimmermann and Julia Tannheimer by a large margin. In the sprint and pursuit, she took silver behind Tannheimer.

In the opening of the 2023/24 season, Kink made her debut in the IBU Cup and immediately left a strong impression. In Kontiolahti, she secured a fifth-place finish in the sprint, and in Idre and Sjusjøen, she consistently earned spots within the top ten. The turning point came in Martell, where she clinched her first IBU Cup victory by winning the shortened individual competition. Her triumph included an eight-tenths of a second lead over teammate Emily Schumann. Despite facing challenges in subsequent races and the European Championships due to subpar shooting, Kink rebounded at the Junior World Championships in Otepää in early March 2024. Displaying improved marksmanship, she secured gold in both the mass start and relay events. This stellar performance earned her a nomination for the World Cup, and she debuted in Soldier Hollow with a 42nd-place finish in the sprint. In the Soldier Hollow stage held in Utah, USA, Kink was a last-minute replacement for Sophia Schneider as the anchor in the German relay. In her debut World Cup relay, she engaged in a fierce battle for victory against Tandrevold. While slightly slower at the shooting range, matching the Norwegian with just one penalty, she secured a commendable second place for the German team in the race, finishing seventeen seconds behind Norway. The following day, Kink went on to claim the 38th position in the pursuit, earning her first World Cup points.

== Biathlon results ==
All results are sourced from the International Biathlon Union.

=== Youth and Junior World Championships ===
7 medals (4 gold, 3 silver)

Year	Age	Individual	Sprint	Pursuit	Mass start	Relay	Mixed relay
(Kazakhstan) 2023 Shchuchinsk	19	Gold	Silver	Silver	—N/a	Gold	Silver
(Estonia) 2024 Otepää	20	11th	5th	—N/a	Gold	Gold	—N/a

=== World Cup ===
Season	Age	Overall			Individual		Sprint		Pursuit		Mass start	
Season	Age	Races	Points	Position	Points	Position	Points	Position	Points	Position	Points	Position
2023–24	20	3/21	3	91st	—N/a	—N/a	—N/a	—N/a	3	76th	—N/a	—N/a

==== Relay podiums ====
No.	Season	Date	Location	Level	Placement	Teammate
1	2023–24	9 March 2024	(United States) Soldier Hollow	World Cup	2nd	Hettich-Walz, Grotian, Voigt
