= Summer Biathlon World Championships 2024 =

Athletics Competition

2024 World Championships
- Location: Otepää, Estonia
- Dates: 22 to 25 August 2024

The 2024 Summer Biathlon World Championships was held from 22 to 25 August 2024 in Otepää, Estonia.

== Medal summary ==
=== Medal table ===
* Host nation (Estonia)

Rank	Nation	Gold	Silver	Bronze	Total
1	Ukraine	3	2	1	6
2	Czech Republic	3	1	4	8
3	Bulgaria	3	1	0	4
4	Latvia	1	0	1	2
4	Slovakia	1	0	1	2
6	Estonia*	1	0	0	1
7	Finland	0	3	0	3
8	Norway	0	2	3	5
9	Belgium	0	1	1	2
10	Croatia	0	1	0	1
10	France	0	1	0	1
12	Sweden	0	0	1	1
Totals (12 entries)		12	12	12	36

== Men ==
Event	Gold		Silver		Bronze	
7.5 km Super Sprint details	Dmytro Pidruchnyi; Ukraine	19:19.5 (0+1+0+0)	Artem Tyshchenko; Ukraine	+5.2 (0+0+0+1)	Tomáš Mikyska; Czech Republic	+7.5 (1+0+0+2)
7.5 km Sprint details	Jakub Štvrtecký; Czech Republic	18:15.1 (0+1)	Émilien Claude; France	+12.4 (0+1)	Thierry Langer; Belgium	+16.2 (0+1)
Gala Mass Start details	Rene Zahkna; Estonia	32:28.6 (0+0+0+3)	Jonáš Mareček; Czech Republic	+7.9 (0+1+0+2)	Andrejs Rastorgujevs; Latvia	+19.7 (1+1+1+2)

=== Junior ===
Event	Gold		Silver		Bronze	
7.5 km Super Sprint details	David Eliáš; Czech Republic	19:32.8 (0+0+1+0)	Matija Legović; Croatia	+10.2 (2+0+0+0)	Victor Berglund; Sweden	+13.2 (0+0+0+1)
7.5 km Sprint details	Vitalii Mandzyn; Ukraine	18:28.9 (0+0)	Haavard Tosterud; Norway	+41.3 (2+0)	Sivert Gerhardsen; Norway	+51.1 (1+0)
10 km Pursiut details	Vitalii Mandzyn; Ukraine	26:44.8 (1+0+0+3)	Sivert Gerhardsen; Norway	+18.8 (0+0+2+2)	Kasper Kalkenberg; Norway	+22.5 (0+0+2+2)

== Women ==
Event	Gold		Silver		Bronze	
7.5 km Super Sprint details	Paulína Bátovská Fialková; Slovakia	21:55.5 (0+0+1+0)	Suvi Minkkinen; Finland	+11.5 (1+0+0+0)	Lucie Charvátová; Czech Republic	+20.2 (1+0+2+2)
6 km Sprint details	Tereza Voborníková; Czech Republic	16:48.5 (0+0)	Lotte Lie; Belgium	+0.1 (0+0)	Paulína Bátovská Fialková; Slovakia	+13.5 (0+1)
Gala Mass Start details	Baiba Bendika; Latvia	29:45.1 (3+0+1+0)	Suvi Minkkinen; Finland	+24.2 (0+1+0+1)	Tereza Voborníková; Czech Republic	+30.3 (0+0+1+0)

=== Junior ===
Event	Gold		Silver		Bronze	
7.5 km Super Sprint details	Lora Hristova; Bulgaria	22:41.9 (0+0+0+1)	Inka Hämäläinen; Finland	+25.9 (1+1+1+0)	Ragna Fodstad; Norway	+27.2 (2+1+1+0)
6 km Sprint details	Valentina Dimitrova; Bulgaria	18:03.9 (2+0)	Viktoriia Khvostenko; Ukraine	+0.6 (0+0)	Olena Horodna; Ukraine	+18.5 (0+2)
7.5 km Pursiut details	Valentina Dimitrova; Bulgaria	23:27.5 (2+0+2+0)	Lora Hristova; Bulgaria	+23.9 (0+2+0+3)	Ilona Plecháčová; Czech Republic	+37.4 (0+2+0+1)
