= Johanna Puff =

German biathlete (born 2002)

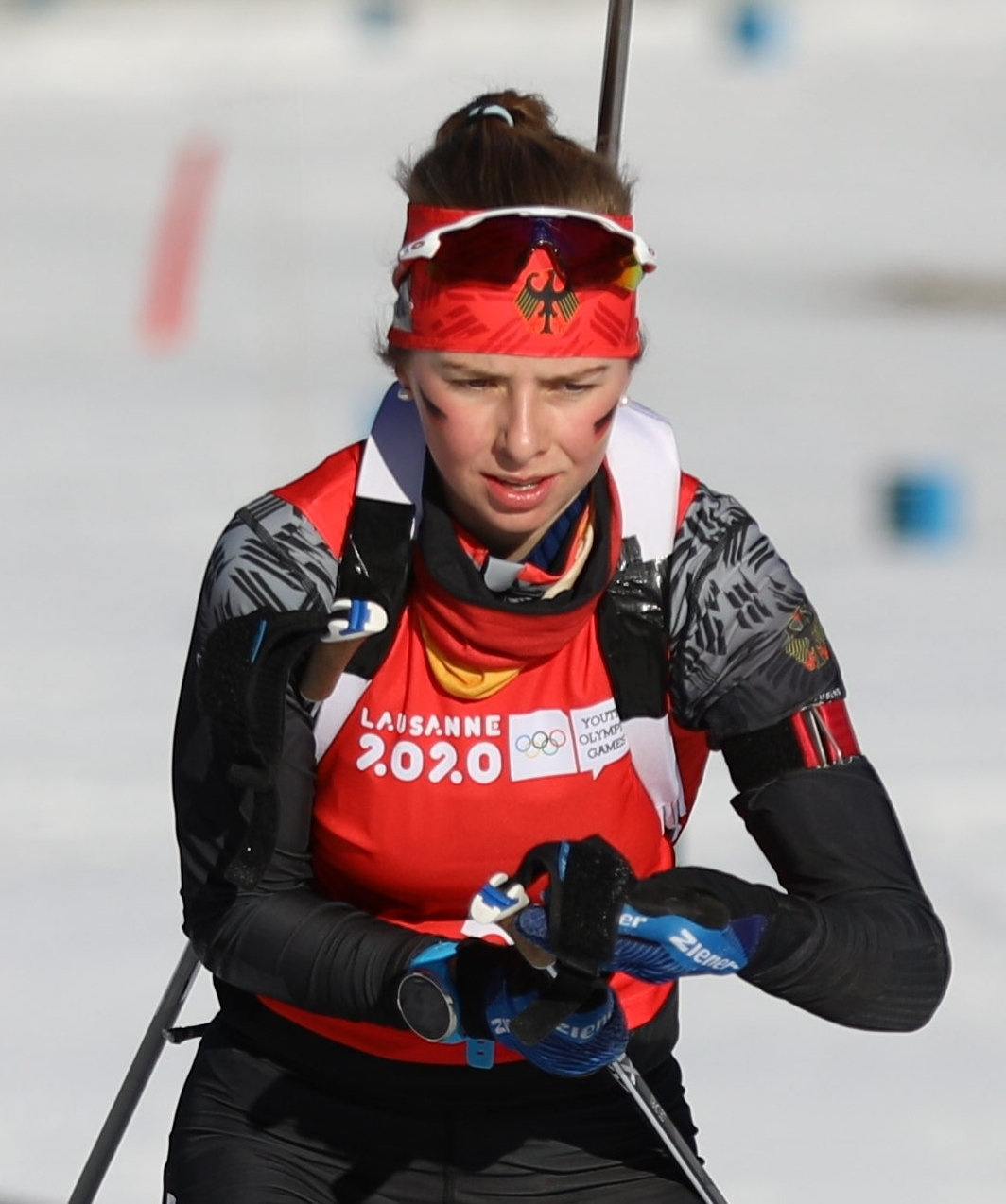
- Johanna Puff in 2020

Personal information
- Nationality: German
- Born: 2 July 2002 (age 24) Rosenheim, Germany

Sport

Professional information
- Club: SC Bayrischzell

World Championships
- Teams: 1 (2025)
- Medals: 9 (0 gold)

World Cup
- Seasons: 2023 –
Medal record
Women's biathlon
Representing Germany
European Championships
Gold medal – first place	2025 Val Martello	15 km individual
Gold medal – first place	2025 Val Martello	4 × 6 km relay
Junior World Championships
Gold medal – first place	2023 Shchuchinsk	4 × 6 km relay
Gold medal – first place	2023 Shchuchinsk	Mixed relay
Silver medal – second place	2022 Soldier Hollow	4 × 6 km relay
Youth World Championships
Bronze medal – third place	2020 Lenzerheide	3 × 6 km relay

Johanna Puff (born 2 July 2002) is a German biathlete. She won several medals with German relay teams at the Junior World Championships.

== Career ==
Puff was born in Rosenheim. She started her youth career for SC Bayrischzell and is trained by Andreas Birnbacher at the Ruhpolding base in the Chiemgau Arena.

Puff appeared internationally for the first time in 2020 as a participant in the Youth Olympic Winter Games, where she narrowly missed out on medals with fifth place in the individual and fourth place in the sprint. Ten days later she took part in the youth category at the Junior World Championships in Lenzerheide, Switzerland, where she won bronze in the relay.

For the 2021/22 season, Johanna Puff was promoted from youth to junior level and started to compete in the IBU Junior Cup. There she achieved top results right from the start and won a super sprint race in Martell and gold in the single mixed relay at the Junior European Championships on Pokljuka together with Darius Lodl. She won the silver medal in a relay race at the Junior World Championships in Soldier Hollow, USA.

During the inaugural event at the 2023 Junior World Championships in Shchuchinsk, Kazakhstan, she clinched gold medals in both the relay and mixed relay and became the junior world champion for the first time.

At the beginning of the 2023/24 season, she won her first race in the sprint in just her third individual start at the IBU Cup in Idre. She was then nominated for the World Cup in Lenzerheide after Hanna Kebinger and Anna Weidel were absent due to illness, where she narrowly missed qualifying for the pursuit by finishing 61st place in the sprint.

== Biathlon results ==
All results are sourced from the International Biathlon Union.

=== World Championships ===
Year	Individual	Sprint	Pursuit	Mass start	Relay	Mixed relay	Single mixed relay
(Switzerland) 2025 Lenzerheide	22nd						

=== Youth and Junior World Championships ===
4 medals (2 gold, 1 silver, 1 bronze)

Year	Age	Individual	Sprint	Pursuit	Relay	Mixed relay
(Switzerland) 2020 Lenzerheide	17	—N/a	50th	36th	Bronze	—N/a
(Austria) 2021 Obertilliach	18	15th	22nd	12th	4th	—N/a
(United States) 2022 Soldier Hollow	19	27th	21st	13th	Silver	—N/a
(Kazakhstan) 2023 Shchuchinsk	20	30th	15th	14th	Gold	Gold
