= Biathlon Junior World Championships 2023 =

Biathlon event in Kazakhstan

2023 IBU Youth & Junior World Championships
- Host city: Shchuchinsk, Kazakhstan
- Dates: 4–12 March
- Main venue: National Ski Center
- Events: 18

The 2023 Biathlon Junior World Championships were held from 4 to 12 March 2023 in Shchuchinsk, Kazakhstan.

== Schedule ==
All times are local (UTC+6).

Date	Time	Event
4 March	13:00	Youth 4 × 6 km W+M mixed relay
4 March	16:00	Junior 4 × 6 km W+M mixed relay
5 March	13:00	Youth Women's 10 km individual
5 March	16:00	Youth Men's 12.5 km individual
6 March	13:00	Junior Women's 12.5 km individual
6 March	16:00	Junior Men's 15 km individual
7 March	13:00	Youth Women's 3 × 6 km relay
7 March	16:00	Youth Men's 3 × 7.5 km relay
8 March	13:00	Junior Women's 4 × 6 km relay
8 March	16:00	Junior Men's 4 × 7.5 km relay
10 March	13:00	Youth Women's 6 km sprint
10 March	16:00	Youth Men's 7.5 km sprint
11 March	13:00	Junior Women's 7.5 km sprint
11 March	16:00	Junior Men's 10 km sprint
12 March	11:00	Youth Women's 7.5 km pursuit
12 March	12:00	Youth Men's 10 km pursuit
12 March	14:15	Junior Women's 10 km pursuit
12 March	15:20	Junior Men's 12.5 km pursuit

== Results ==
All results are sourced from the International Biathlon Union.

=== Junior events ===
==== Men ====
Event	Gold		Silver		Bronze	
15 km individual details	Benjamin Menz; Germany	43:12.3 (1+1+0+1)	Einar Hedegart; Norway	43:19.3 (0+1+0+1)	Isak Frey; Norway	43:38.3 (1+1+1+0)
10 km sprint details	Campbell Wright; New Zealand	23:38.9 (0+0)	Jan Guńka; Poland	24:14.3 (0+0)	Maxime Germain; United States	24:25.5 (1+0)
12.5 km pursuit details	Martin Nevland; Norway	33:07.6 (1+0+0+1)	Einar Hedegart; Norway	33:36.6 (0+1+1+1)	Trym Gerhardsen; Norway	33:42.7 (0+0+1+0)
4 × 7.5 km relay details	Norway Trym Gerhardsen; Einar Hedegart; Martin Nevland; Isak Frey	1:19:05.9 (0+0) (0+3) (0+3) (3+3) (0+1) (0+1) (0+1) (1+3)	Germany Franz Schaser; Fabian Kaskel; Benjamin Menz; Hans Köllner	1:19:14.8 (0+0) (0+3) (0+0) (0+1) (0+2) (0+3) (0+2) (0+3)	Italy Christoph Pircher; Fabio Piller Cottrer; Nicolò Betemps; Marco Barale	1:20:14.2 (0+2) (0+1) (0+3) (0+1) (0+1) (0+3) (0+0) (0+1)

==== Women ====
Event	Gold		Silver		Bronze	
12.5 km individual details	Kaja Zorč; Slovenia	42:37.3 (0+3+0+0)	Jeanne Richard; France	43:12.2 (0+2+1+1)	Léonie Jeannier; France	43:13.6 (3+1+0+0)
7.5 km sprint details	Selina Grotian; Germany	20:49.0 (1+1)	Jeanne Richard; France	21:41.8 (0+1)	Sara Andersson; Sweden	21:43.7 (0+1)
10 km pursuit details	Selina Grotian; Germany	30:00.3 (2+0+1+1)	Jeanne Richard; France	31:13.4 (0+0+1+2)	Tuva Aas Stræte; Norway	31:23.0 (0+0+0+1)
4 × 6 km relay details	Germany Selina Kastl; Johanna Puff; Marlene Fichtner; Selina Grotian	1:12:49.3 (0+0) (0+1) (1+3) (0+1) (0+2) (0+3) (0+3) (0+3)	France Fany Bertrand; Camille Coupé; Jeanne Richard; Léonie Jeannier	1:13:41.8 (0+1) (0+3) (1+3) (0+3) (0+0) (0+3) (0+0) (0+2)	Norway Linnea Winsvold; Maren Bakken; Siri Skar; Tuva Aas Stræte	1:14:07.2 (0+1) (0+0) (0+0) (0+2) (0+1) (0+1) (0+1) (0+2)

==== Mixed ====
Event	Gold		Silver		Bronze	
4 × 6 km W+M relay details	Germany Johanna Puff; Selina Grotian; Benjamin Menz; Hans Köllner	1:06:19.4 (0+1) (0+1) (0+2) (0+2) (0+2) (0+2) (0+0) (0+2)	France Léonie Jeannier; Jeanne Richard; Théo Guiraud-Poillot; Jacques Jefferies	1:06:45.2 (0+0) (0+0) (0+1) (0+0) (0+3) (0+0) (0+1) (0+2)	Norway Maren Bakken; Tuva Aas Stræte; Martin Nevland; Isak Frey	1:06:56.2 (0+1) (1+3) (0+2) (1+3) (0+0) (0+1) (0+1) (0+1)

=== Youth events ===
==== Men ====
Event	Gold		Silver		Bronze	
12.5 km individual details	Jakub Borguľa; Slovakia	35:29.2 (1+0+0+0)	Sivert Gerhardsen; Norway	35:36.6 (0+1+0+1)	Matija Legović; Croatia	35:39.4 (0+1+0+1)
7.5 km sprint details	Kasper Kalkenberg; Norway	19:44.4 (2+1)	Matija Legović; Croatia	19:50.9 (1+1)	Sivert Gerhardsen; Norway	19:55.9 (1+1)
10 km pursuit details	Sivert Gerhardsen; Norway	27:25.9 (0+1+1+0)	Albert Engelmann; Germany	27:45.2 (1+1+1+0)	Arttu Heikkinen; Finland	28:26.2 (1+1+2+0)
3 × 7.5 km relay details	Czech Republic Jonáš Kabrda; Daniel Malušek; Ferdinand Jansa	1:06:51.7 (0+0) (0+1) (0+0) (0+0) (0+0) (0+2)	Germany Elias Seidl; Erik Hafenmair; Albert Engelmann	1:07:13.0 (0+1) (0+2) (0+2) (0+2) (0+2) (2+3)	Norway Sivert Rusten; Kasper Kalkenberg; Sivert Gerhardsen	1:08:17.7 (0+3) (0+1) (1+3) (0+2) (3+3) (0+2)

==== Women ====
Event	Gold		Silver		Bronze	
10 km individual details	Julia Kink; Germany	32:23.8 (1+0+0+1)	Alessia Laager; Switzerland	33:23.6 (1+0+0+0)	Oleksandra Merkushyna; Ukraine	33:34.0 (1+1+1+0)
6 km sprint details	Julia Tannheimer; Germany	17:45.0 (1+1)	Julia Kink; Germany	18:11.2 (1+0)	Astrid Plösch; Italy	18:27.6 (0+0)
7.5 km pursuit details	Julia Tannheimer; Germany	24:38.4 (1+1+1+1)	Julia Kink; Germany	26:22.1 (3+0+2+0)	Maren Brännare-Gran; Norway	26:46.0 (0+1+3+0)
3 × 6 km relay details	Germany Lea Zimmermann; Julia Tannheimer; Julia Kink	56:24.2 (0+2) (0+2) (1+3) (0+1) (0+3) (0+0)	Italy Astrid Plösch; Fabiana Carpella; Carlotta Gautero	58:10.7 (0+0) (0+2) (0+1) (2+3) (0+2) (1+3)	Norway Lene Jøranli; Ragna Fodstad; Maren Brännare-Gran	58:29.8 (0+1) (0+3) (0+0) (0+3) (0+1) (1+3)

==== Mixed ====
Event	Gold		Silver		Bronze	
4 × 6 km W+M relay details	Norway Ragna Fodstad; Maren Brännare-Gran; Kasper Kalkenberg; Sivert Gerhardsen	1:11:51.1 (2+3) (0+1) (1+3) (0+3) (0+2) (0+2) (0+1) (0+2)	Germany Julia Kink; Julia Tannheimer; Tim Nechwatal; Elias Seidl	1:12:26.6 (0+0) (1+3) (0+2) (0+2) (1+3) (3+3) (0+1) (0+2)	Ukraine Olena Horodna; Oleksandra Merkushyna; Bohdan Borkovskyi; Mykhailo Khmil	1:13:21.7 (0+2) (1+3) (0+1) (0+0) (2+3) (0+2) (0+2) (0+3)

== Medal table ==
Rank	Nation	Gold	Silver	Bronze	Total
1	Germany	9	6	0	15
2	Norway	5	3	9	17
3	Czech Republic	1	0	0	1
3	New Zealand	1	0	0	1
3	Slovakia	1	0	0	1
3	Slovenia	1	0	0	1
7	France	0	5	1	6
8	Italy	0	1	2	3
9	Croatia	0	1	1	2
10	Poland	0	1	0	1
10	Switzerland	0	1	0	1
12	Ukraine	0	0	2	2
13	Finland	0	0	1	1
13	Sweden	0	0	1	1
13	United States	0	0	1	1
Totals (15 entries)		18	18	18	54

Source: IBU
