= Margie Freed =

American biathlete (born 1997)

Personal information
- Nationality: American
- Born: 10 November 1997 (age 28) Denver, Colorado, U.S.

Sport
- Country: United States
- Sport: Biathlon

Margie Freed (born 10 November 1997) is an American biathlete and cross-country skier who has competed in the Biathlon World Cup since 2023. She is participating in the 2026 Olympic Games.

She attended Eastview High School, where she won several Nordic skiing events. Her best career result is 21st place in the individual event at the 2026 Olympic Games in Milano-Cortina.

== Biathlon results ==
All results are sourced from the International Biathlon Union.

=== Olympic Games ===
0 medal

Event	Individual	Sprint	Pursuit	Mass start	Relay	Mixed relay
(Italy) 2026 Milano Cortina	21st	66th	—	—	18th	14th

=== World Championships ===
0 medal

Event	Individual	Sprint	Pursuit	Mass start	Relay	Mixed relay	Single mixed relay
(Switzerland) 2025 Lenzerheide	—	64th	—	—	19th	—	—

==== World Cup Team podiums ====
- No Victories
- 1 podiums (1 Mixed)

No.	Season	Date	Location	Race	Place	Teammate(s)
1	2025-26	15 March 2026	(Estonia) Otepää	Mixed Relay	3rd	Maxime Germain, Campbell Wright, Deedra Irwin
