= Olena Horodna =

Ukrainian biathlete (born 2004)

Personal information
- Nationality: Ukrainian
- Born: 6 July 2004 (age 21) Lviv, Ukraine

Sport
- Country: Ukraine
- Sport: Biathlon
Medal record
Women's biathlon
Representing Ukraine
Youth World Championships
Bronze medal – third place	2023 Shchuchinsk	Mixed Relay

Olena Horodna (Ukrainian: Олена Миколаївна Городна; born 6 July 2004) is a Ukrainian biathlete. She made her debut in the Biathlon World Cup in 2022.

== Career ==
Olena Horodna made her international debut at the 2020 Youth World Championships in Lenzerheide. In the winter of 2021/22, the Ukrainian athlete regularly competed in the IBU Junior Cup and narrowly missed the podium in the relay race in Martell, finishing fourth. In March 2022, Horodna fled to Poland with her family following the Russian invasion of her homeland. At that time, Ukrainian biathletes did not participate in any competitions due to the war. With the support of the Czech federation, Horodna and her sister Yuliia were given the opportunity to compete in a World Cup sprint race in Otepää, Estonia. This was Olena Horodna's first race at the senior level, at just 17 years old and without prior experience in adult competitions. She finished last in the field, placing 85th.

In the winter of 2022/23, Horodna competed exclusively at the junior level and achieved a podium finish in Haanja with the relay team in February 2023. She also performed well at the 2023 Youth World Championships, securing two seventh-place finishes in the individual and sprint races, and winning a bronze medal in the mixed relay alongside Oleksandra Merkushyna, Bohdan Borkovskyi, and Mykhailo Khmil. In August of the same year, she also won two bronze medals in the super sprint and pursuit events at the Summer Biathlon Junior World Championships. At the start of the 2023/24 season, Horodna made her IBU Cup debut in Kontiolahti and immediately earned ranking points with a 29th-place finish in the individual race. As a result, she was given her first planned World Cup start in Hochfilzen, where she finished 68th in the sprint. After celebrating a victory in the Junior Cup with the mixed relay in December, she returned to the highest level of competition after the New Year. In Oberhof, she teamed up with Yuliia Dzhima, Anastasiya Merkushyna, and Khrystyna Dmytrenko to finish eighth in the relay. Another bronze medal followed at the 2024 Summer Biathlon Junior World Championships in Otepää, where she placed third in the sprint competition.

At the start of the 2024/25 season, Horodna became a regular member of the World Cup team for the first time. While she initially struggled to achieve notable results in individual races, she impressed in almost all relay events, finishing in the Top 10 five times throughout the season. In Antholz, she finished 49th in the sprint, qualifying for her first pursuit race at the World Cup level. She also participated in the World Championships, where she placed 61st in the individual race. Although she narrowly missed out on a medal at the Junior World Championships, finishing fourth in the sprint, Horodna delivered a strong performance in the World Cup event in Pokljuka, Slovenia. In the individual race, she managed to hit all 20 targets for the first time in her career, finishing 13th overall, earning her first World Cup points, and qualifying for the mass start, where she placed 24th. In the final stage in Oslo, Holmenkollen she finished in the top 15 for the second time this season, placing 15th in the sprint race.

== Biathlon results ==
All results are sourced from the International Biathlon Union.

=== Olympic Games ===
0 medal

Event	Individual	Sprint	Pursuit	Mass start	Relay	Mixed relay
(Italy) 2026 Milano Cortina	—	76th	—	—	—	8th

=== World Championships ===
Event	Individual	Sprint	Pursuit	Mass start	Relay	Mixed relay	Single mixed relay
(Switzerland) 2025 Lenzerheide	61st	75th	—	—	11th	—	—

=== World Cup ===
Season	Age	Overall			Individual		Sprint		Pursuit		Mass start	
Season	Age	Races	Points	Position	Points	Position	Points	Position	Points	Position	Points	Position
2021–22	17	1/22	Did not earn World Cup points									
2023–24	19	2/21	Did not earn World Cup points									
2024–25	20	12/21	84	51st	28	38th	26	59th	—	—	30	38th

=== Youth and Junior World Championships ===
1 medals (1 bronze)

Year	Age	Individual	Sprint	Pursuit	Mass Start	Relay	Mixed Relay
(Switzerland) 2020 Lenzerheide	15	54th	59th	45th	N/A	11th	N/A
(Austria) 2021 Obertilliach	16	19th	39th	25th	N/A	13th	N/A
(Kazakhstan) 2023 Shchuchinsk	18	7th	7th	11th	N/A	4th	Bronze
(Estonia) 2024 Otepää	19	19th	18th	N/A	15th	8th	8th
(Sweden) 2025 Östersund	20	7th	4th	N/A	15th	4th	5th
