= Arttu Heikkinen =

Finnish biathlete (born 2004)

Personal information
- Born: 20 April 2004 (age 22) Kuopio, Finland

Sport
- Country: Finland

Professional information
- Sport: Biathlon
- World Cup debut: 2024
Medal record
Men's biathlon
Representing Finland
Youth World Championships
Gold medal – first place	2022 Soldier Hollow	Individual
Bronze medal – third place	2022 Soldier Hollow	Pursuit
Bronze medal – third place	2023 Shchuchinsk	Pursuit

Arttu Heikkinen (born 20 April 2004) is a Finnish biathlete. He won the Youth World Championships individual event in 2022 and took bronze in the Pursuit that same year as well as the next.

== Personal life ==
During a hunting trip in September 2024, Heikkinen accidentally shot his godfather figure causing him to lose an eye. He was found guilty of aggravated assault and ordered to pay a fine to his victim. On appeal, his firearms license was not revoked at the time which allowed him to continue competing.

== Biathlon results ==
All results are sourced from the International Biathlon Union.

=== Youth and Junior World Championships ===
3 medals

Year	Age	Individual	Sprint	Pursuit	Relay	Mixed relay
(United States) 2022 Soldier Hollow	17	Gold	5th	Bronze	5th	—
(Kazakhstan) 2023 Shchuchinsk	18	13th	8th	Bronze	4th	6th
