= Jan Guńka =

Polish biathlete (born 2002)

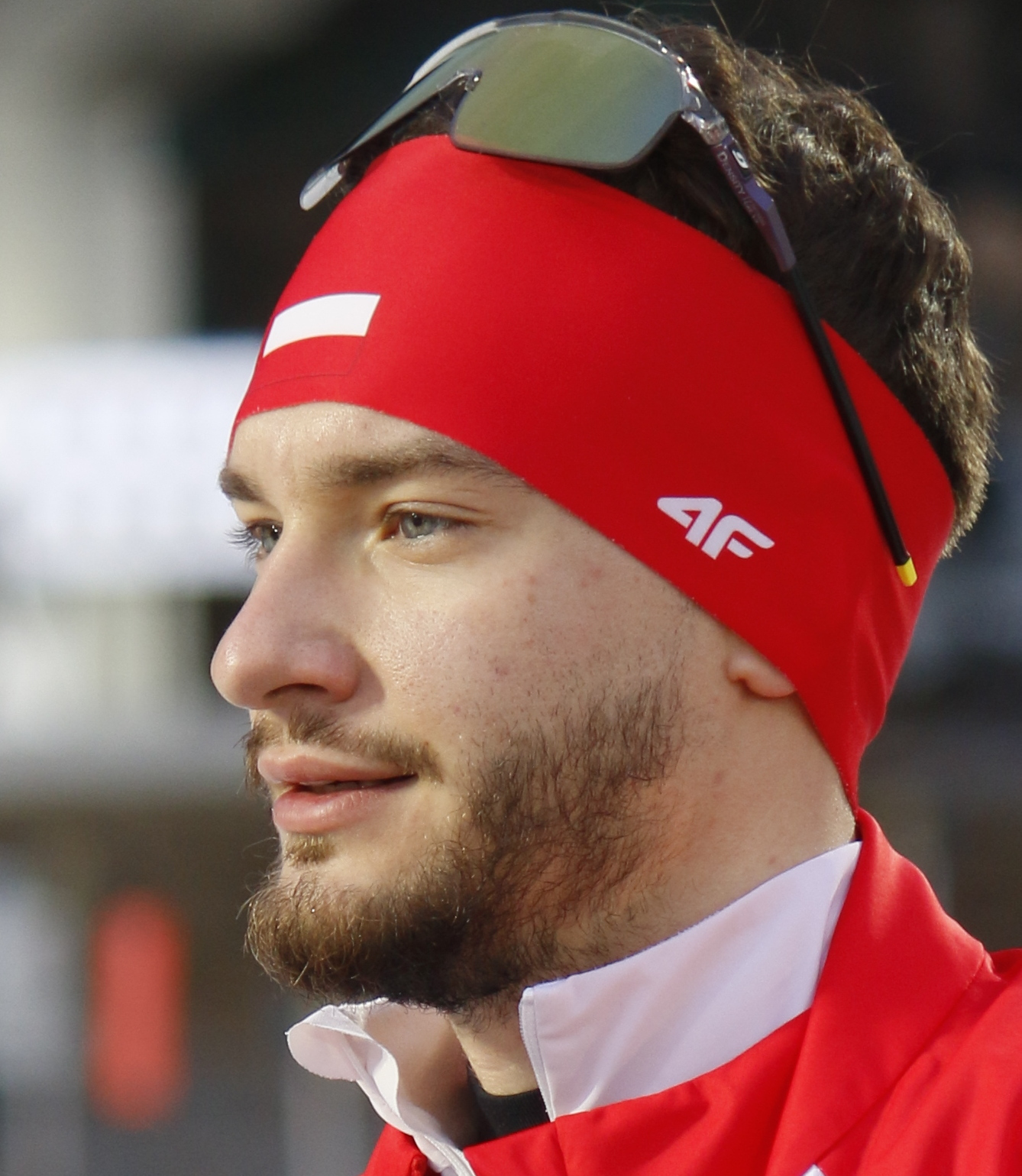
- Guńka in 2024

Personal information
- Nationality: Polish
- Born: 14 April 2002 (age 24) Zakopane, Poland

Sport
- Country: Poland
- Sport: Biathlon
Medal record
Men's biathlon
Representing Poland
Junior World Championships
Silver medal – second place	2023 Shchuchinsk	10 km sprint
Silver medal – second place	2024 Otepää	10 km sprint
Bronze medal – third place	2024 Otepää	15 km individual
Youth World Championships
Gold medal – first place	2021 Obertilliach	3 × 7.5 km relay
Bronze medal – third place	2021 Obertilliach	7.5 km Sprint

Jan Guńka (born 14 April 2002) is a Polish biathlete.

== Career ==
Jan Guńka gained his first international experience at the 2019 Youth World Championships, achieving a best individual result of 22nd place in the sprint. The following winter, he competed in the IBU Junior Cup, securing Top-10 finishes with the relay team at the IBU Junior Cup and Youth World Championships. He also participated in the Youth Olympic Games, finishing 10th in the individual event and eighth with the mixed relay team.

In January 2021, Guńka made his debut in the IBU Cup at Arber, earning ranking points with a 36th-place finish in the sprint. The Junior World Championships of the same year were highly successful for him, winning the bronze medal in the sprint behind Denis Irodow and Fabio Piller Cottrer. Additionally, he and his teammates Konrad Badacz and Marcin Zawół emerged victorious in the relay race.

Despite his successes in the junior category, it was somewhat surprising after the season's end that he clinched the Polish national title in the individual event, surpassing competitors like Grzegorz Guzik. Throughout the winter of 2021/22, Guńka dominated every race he participated in, except for one individual competition. Consequently, he made his World Cup debut in January at the Oberhof competitions, finishing his first sprint in 67th place.

At the 2022 Junior European Championships, Guńka secured another medal in the pursuit race, although a missed weekend prevented him from winning the overall Junior Cup. At the end of the season, he rejoined the World Cup team, improving his best result in Otepää by one position.

Despite his young age, Guńka was not part of the Junior Cup in the 2022/23 season but consistently featured in the national team for the World Cup. In 2022, he struggled to make an impact, but success returned in January. At Pokljuka, he was the leadoff skier for the mixed relay alongside Marcin Zawół, Kamila Żuk, and Joanna Jakieła, finishing in eighth place. In Ruhpolding, Guńka, along with Marcin Zawół, Grzegorz Guzik, and Andrzej Nędza-Kubiniec, achieved Poland's best result in a men's relay since the 2006/07 season with a 10th-place finish.

Guńka achieved his best individual performance for the 2023 World Championships. Despite two shooting misses, he finished 39th in the sprint, qualifying for his first pursuit race at the World Cup level, where he finished 48th—the season concluded with the Junior World Championships, where the Pole won the silver medal in the sprint, finishing behind Campbell Wright.

== Personal life ==
He is the son of Polish biathlete Halina Nowak-Guńka. He also has an older brother, Kacper Guńka, who is also a biathlete.

== Career results ==
=== Olympic Games ===
0 medal

Event	Individual	Sprint	Pursuit	Mass start	Relay	Mixed relay
(Italy) 2026 Milano Cortina	—	—	—	—	—	9th

=== World Championships ===
0 medals

Event	Individual	Sprint	Pursuit	Mass start	Relay	Mixed relay	Single mixed relay
(Germany) 2023 Oberhof	87th	39th	48th	—	17th	—	—
(Czech Republic) 2024 Nové Město na Moravě	61st	73rd	—	—	9th	15th	—
(Switzerland) 2025 Lenzerheide	91st	55th	53rd	—	16th	14th	—

=== Youth and Junior World Championships ===
5 medals (1 gold, 2 silver, 2 bronze)

Year	Age	Individual	Sprint	Pursuit	Mass Start	Relay
(Slovakia) 2019 Brezno-Osrblie	16	71st	22nd	46th	N/A	9th
(Switzerland) 2020 Lenzerheide	17	19th	19th	18th	N/A	6th
(Austria) 2021 Obertilliach	18	24th	Bronze	9th	N/A	Gold
(United States) 2022 Soldier Hollow	19	21st	15th	25th	N/A	—
(Kazakhstan) 2023 Shchuchinsk	20	8th	Silver	19th	N/A	5th
(Estonia) 2024 Otepää	21	Bronze	Silver	N/A	8th	6th
