= Jessica Jislová =

Czech biathlete (born 1994)

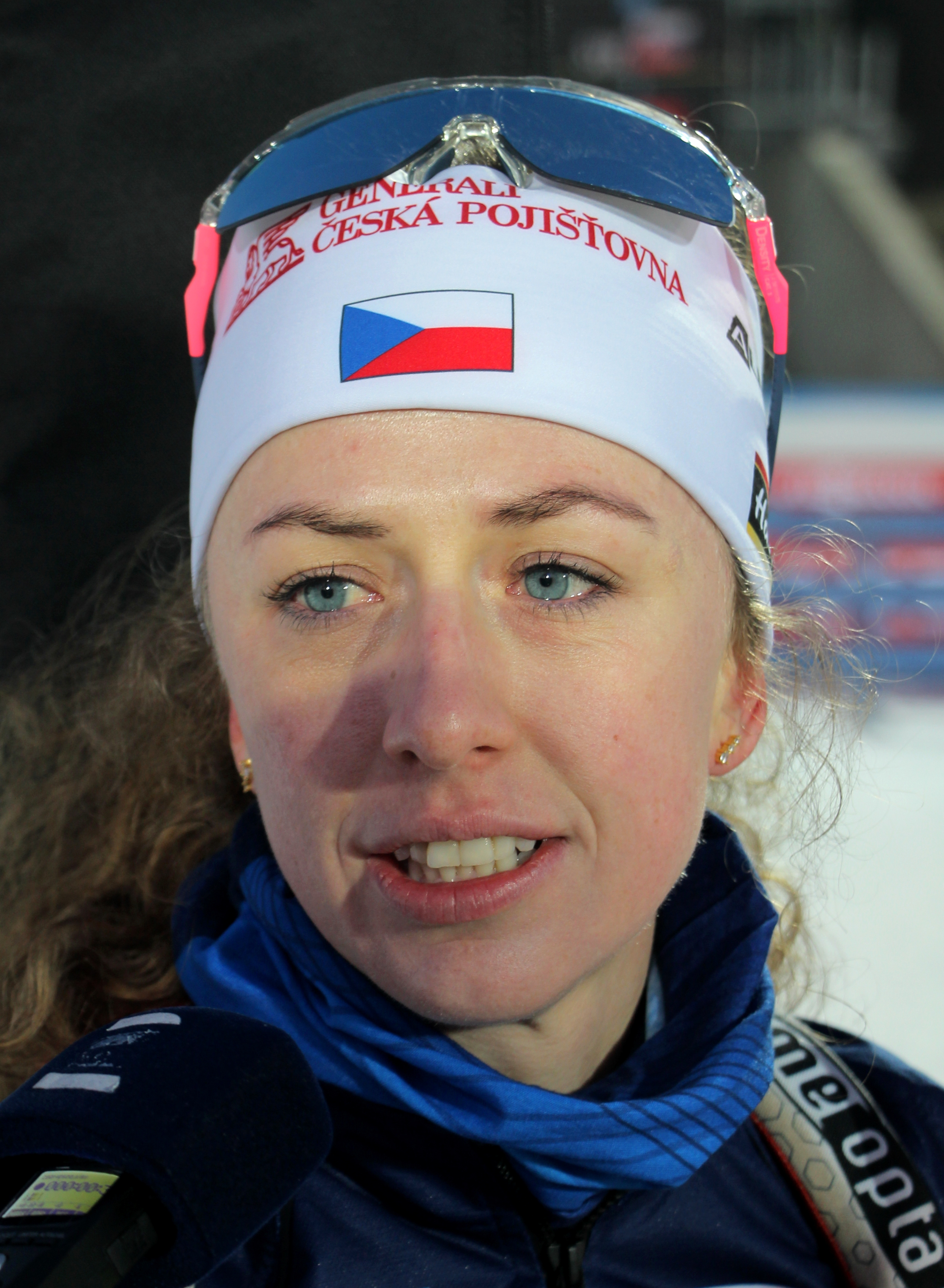
- Jislová in 2023

Personal information
- Nationality: Czech
- Born: 28 July 1994 (age 31) Jablonec nad Nisou, Czech Republic

Sport
- Country: Czech Republic
- Sport: Biathlon
Medal record
Women's biathlon
Representing Czech Republic
World Championships
Silver medal – second place	2025 Lenzerheide	Mixed relay

Jessica Jislová (Czech pronunciation: [ˈʤɛsɪka ˈjɪslovaː]; born 28 July 1994) is a Czech biathlete. She has competed in the Biathlon World Cup, and represented the Czech Republic at the Biathlon World Championships 2016.

== Biathlon results ==
All results are sourced from the International Biathlon Union.

=== Olympic Games ===
0 medals

Event	Individual	Sprint	Pursuit	Mass start	Relay	Mixed relay
(South Korea) 2018 Pyeongchang	72nd	23rd	23rd	—	12th	—
(China) 2022 Beijing	27th	31st	35th	—	8th	12th
(Italy) 2026 Milano Cortina	51st	—	—	—	5th	—

=== World Championships ===
1 medal

Event	Individual	Sprint	Pursuit	Mass start	Relay	Mixed relay	Single mixed relay
(Norway) 2016 Oslo	—	41st	48th	—	6th	—	—N/a
(Austria) 2017 Hochfilzen	—	—	—	—	4th	—	—N/a
(Sweden) 2019 Östersund	55th	—	—	—	15th	—	—
(Italy) 2020 Antholz-Anterselva	—	70th	—	—	4th	—	—
(Slovenia) 2021 Pokljuka	64th	71st	—	—	10th	—	16th
(Czech Republic) 2024 Nové Město na Moravě	12nd	48th	42nd	—	7th	14th	—
(Switzerland) 2025 Lenzerheide	36th	54th	36th	—	12th	Silver	—
