= Franziska Preuß =

German biathlete (born 1994)

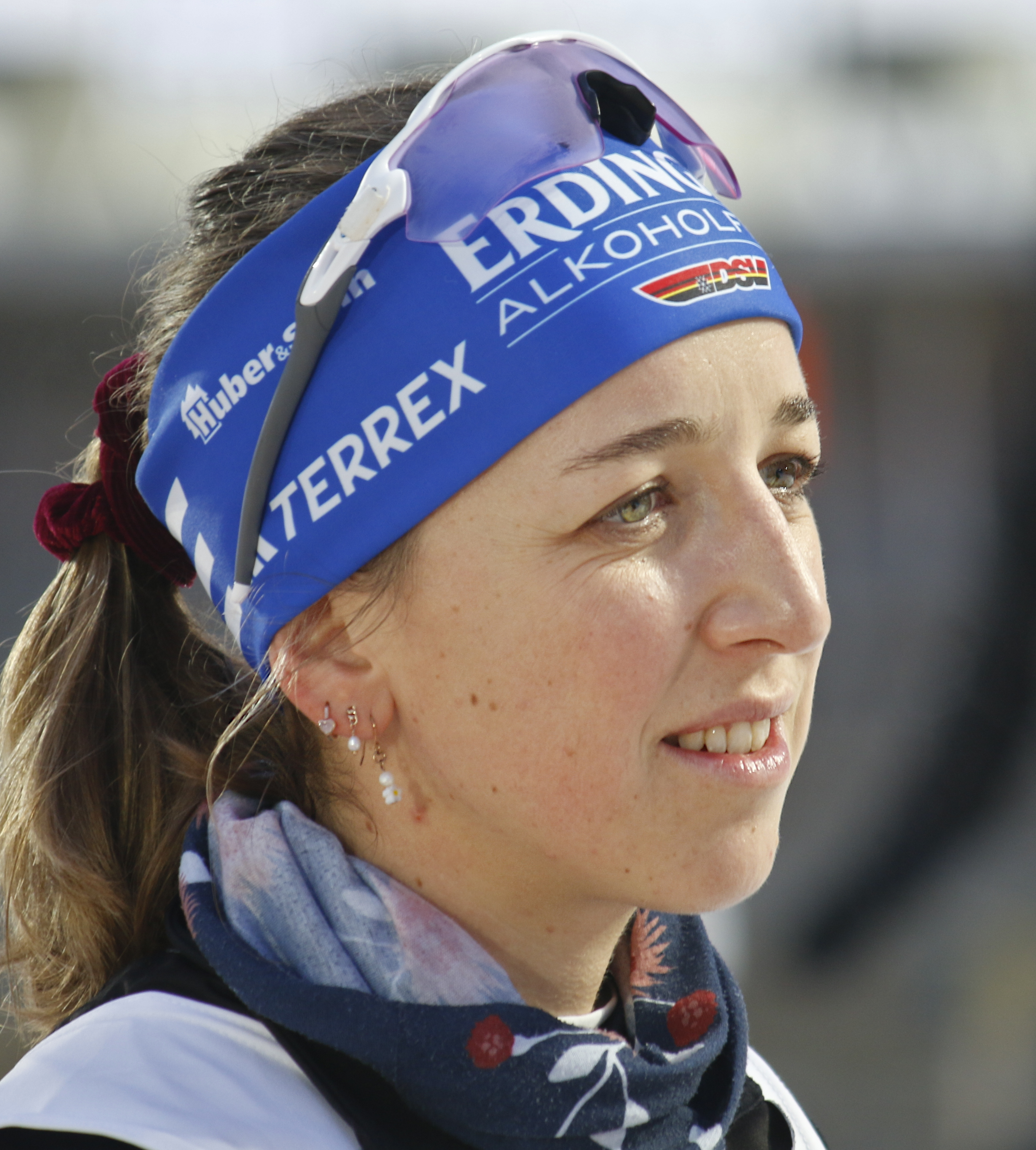
- Preuß in 2024

Personal information
- Nationality: German
- Born: 11 March 1994 (age 32) Wasserburg am Inn, Germany
- Height: 1.73 m (5 ft 8 in)
- Weight: 60 kg (132 lb)

Sport

Professional information
- Sport: Biathlon
- Club: SC Haag
- World Cup debut: 2013

Olympic Games
- Teams: 4 (2014, 2018, 2022, 2026)
- Medals: 2 (0 gold)

World Championships
- Teams: 7 (2015–2016, 2019–2021, 2024–2025)
- Medals: 11 (2 gold)

World Cup
- Seasons: 13 (2013/14–2025/26)
- Individual victories: 6
- All victories: 14
- Individual podiums: 28
- All podiums: 61
- Overall titles: 1 (2024/25)
- Discipline titles: 3: 2 Mass start (2014–15, 2024–25); 1 Sprint (2024–25)
Medal record
Women's biathlon
Representing Germany
Event	1st	2nd	3rd
Olympic Games	0	0	2
World Championships	2	6	3
Total	2	6	5
Olympic Games
Bronze medal – third place	2022 Beijing	4 × 6 km relay
Bronze medal – third place	2026 Milano Cortina	Mixed relay
World Championships
Gold medal – first place	2015 Kontiolahti	4 x 6 km relay
Gold medal – first place	2025 Lenzerheide	10 km pursuit
Silver medal – second place	2015 Kontiolahti	12.5 km mass start
Silver medal – second place	2016 Oslo	Mixed relay
Silver medal – second place	2020 Antholz	4 x 6 km relay
Silver medal – second place	2020 Antholz	Single mixed relay
Silver medal – second place	2021 Pokljuka	4 x 6 km relay
Silver medal – second place	2025 Lenzerheide	7.5 km sprint
Bronze medal – third place	2016 Oslo	4 × 6 km relay
Bronze medal – third place	2025 Lenzerheide	Mixed relay
Bronze medal – third place	2025 Lenzerheide	Single mixed relay
European Championships
Gold medal – first place	2013 Bansko	Relay
Silver medal – second place	2013 Bansko	Pursuit
Winter Youth Olympics
Gold medal – first place	2012 Innsbruck	Sprint
Gold medal – first place	2012 Innsbruck	Mixed relay
Gold medal – first place	2012 Innsbruck	Biathlon/Cross-Country relay
Silver medal – second place	2012 Innsbruck	Pursuit
Junior World Championships
Gold medal – first place	2013 Obertilliach	3 × 6 km relay
Bronze medal – third place	2013 Obertilliach	10 km pursuit
Bronze medal – third place	2013 Obertilliach	12.5 km individual
- Updated on 16 February 2025

Franziska Preuß (also spelled Preuss, born 11 March 1994) is a German former biathlete and the World Cup winner of the 2024–25 season. She made her World Cup debut during the 2013–14 season and represented Germany at the 2014, 2018, 2022 and 2026 Winter Olympics.

Preuß has won gold medals at the Biathlon World Championships, triumphing in the relay in 2015 and the pursuit in 2025. She also secured the mass start title in the 2014–15 and 2024–25 seasons, along with the sprint title in the 2024–25 season. She achieved two top–3 finishes in the overall World Cup standings, placing third in the 2020–21 season and finally won the World Cup in the 2024–25 season.

== Biathlon results ==
All results are sourced from the International Biathlon Union.

=== Olympic Games ===
2 medals (2 bronze)

Year	Age	Individual	Sprint	Pursuit	Mass start	Relay	Mixed relay
(Russia) 2014 Sochi	19	DNF	40th	39th	—	10th	—
(South Korea) 2018 Pyeongchang	23	4th	—	—	12th	8th	—
(China) 2022 Beijing	27	25th	30th	15th	8th	Bronze	—
(Italy) 2026 Milano Cortina	31	10th	7th	6th	28th	4th	Bronze

*The mixed relay was added as an event in 2014.

=== World Championships ===
11 medals (2 gold, 6 silver, 3 bronze)

Year	Individual	Sprint	Pursuit	Mass start	Relay	Mixed relay	Single mixed relay
(Finland) 2015 Kontiolahti	—	14th	13th	Silver	Gold	6th	—N/a
(Norway) 2016 Oslo	—	14th	6th	8th	Bronze	Silver	—N/a
(Sweden) 2019 Östersund	38th	16th	27th	19th	—	—	—
(Italy) 2020 Antholz	5th	8th	7th	8th	Silver	4th	Silver
(Slovenia) 2021 Pokljuka	7th	8th	5th	6th	Silver	7th	7th
(Czech Republic) 2024 Nové Město	15th	6th	6th	11th		5th	
(Switzerland) 2025 Lenzerheide	10th	Silver	Gold	7th	5th	Bronze	Bronze

*During Olympic seasons competitions are only held for those events not included in the Olympic program.
**The single mixed relay was added as an event in 2019.

=== Winter Youth Olympics ===
Year	Age	Sprint	Pursuit	Relay	Mixed relay
(Austria) 2012 Innsbruck	18	Gold	Silver	Gold	Gold

=== World Cup ===
Season	Overall			Individual		Sprint		Pursuit		Mass start	
Season	Races	Points	Position	Points	Position	Points	Position	Points	Position	Points	Position
2013–14	18/22	382	18th	25	26th	140	21st	150	13th	67	16th
2014–15	22/25	658	9th	47	19th	196	13th	197	8th	218	1st
2015–16	17/25	533	12th	22	40th	203	11th	213	9th	95	18th
2016–17	8/26	231	35th	43	24th	58	45th	92	34th	38	33rd
2017–18	17/22	306	22nd	20	38th	99	25th	113	21st	74	25th
2018–19	22/25	572	9th	58	16th	180	12th	182	9th	152	7th
2019–20	17/21	573	6th	109	5th	215	6th	133	10th	116	17th
2020–21	26/26	840	3rd	59	13th	267	7th	240	3rd	183	2nd
2021–22	13/22	357	21st	18	40th	137	25th	108	22nd	94	13th
2022–23	7/20	115	42nd	–	–	36	52nd	53	34th	26	35th
2023–24	11/21	539	11th	109	6th	193	10th	201	11th	36	28th
2024–25	21/21	1278	1st	190	2nd	414	1st	319	3rd	355	1st
2025–26	11/21	394	16th	77	12th	123	18th	121	17th	73	19th

=== Shooting statistics ===
Season	Overall	Individual	Sprint	Pursuit	Mass Start	Relay
2013–14	80.2 (299/373)	80.0 (32/40)	76.3 (61/80)	82.9 (116/140)	85.0 (51/60)	73.6(39/53)
2014–15	85.2 (381/447)	90.0 (36/40)	78.9 (71/90)	87.5 (105/120)	90.0 (90/100)	81.4 (79/97)
2015–16	89.9 (295/328)	85.0 (17/20)	87.1 (25/30)	94.2 (113/120)	90.0 (54/60)	86.2 (50/58)
2016–17	87.8 (144/164)	85.0 (17/20)	83.3 (25/30)	90.0 (54/60)	90.0 (18/20)	88.2 (30/38)
2017–18	86.8 (330/380)	91.7 (55/60)	81.4 (57/70)	85.8 (103/120)	93.3 (56/60)	84.3 (59/70)
2018–19	83.3 (353/424)	86.7 (52/60)	83.8 (67/80)	84.3 (118/140)	85.0 (68/80)	75.0 (48/64)
2019–20	87.4 (348/398)	91.7 (55/60)	85.7 (60/70)	87.5 (70/80)	90.0 (54/60)	85.2 (109/128)
2020–21	85.8 (452/527)	85.0 (51/60)	87.0 (87/100)	86.9 (139/160)	86.0 (86/100)	83.2 (89/107)
2021–22	86.4 (292/338)	80.0 (32/40)	76.8 (55/70)	92.0 (92/100)	88.3 (53/60)	88.2 (60/68)
2022–23	85.8 (103/120)	–	86.7 (26/30)	83.3 (50/60)	85.0 (17/20)	100 (10/10)
2023–24	89.4 (269/301)	93.3 (56/60)	90.0 (45/50)	92.0 (92/100)	97.5 (39/40)	72.5 (37/51)
2024–25	91.6 (466/509)	93.8 (75/80)	91.3 (73/80)	90.0 (126/140)	94.2 (113/120)	88.8 (79/89)
2025–26	84.3 (258/306)	86.7 (52/60)	92.5 (37/40)	92.5 (74/80)	81.7 (49/60)	69.7 (46/66)

Key:Hits / shots, percentage. Results in all IBU World Cup races including relay events.

=== Individual podiums ===
No.	Season	Date	Location	Race	Level	Placement
1	2014–15	18 January 2015	Ruhpolding, Germany	12.5 km Mass start	World Cup	2nd
2	2014–15	15 March 2015	Kontiolahti, Finland	12.5 km Mass start	World Championships	2nd
3	2014–15	21 March 2015	Khanty-Mansiysk, Russia	10 km Pursuit	World Cup	3rd
4	2018–19	20 January 2019	Ruhpolding, Germany	12.5 km Mass Start	World Cup	1st
5	2018–19	21 March 2019	Oslo Holmenkollen, Norway	7.5 km Sprint	World Cup	2nd
6	2019–20	8 March 2020	Nové Město, Czech Republic	12.5 km Mass Start	World Cup	3rd
7	2019–20	13 March 2020	Kontiolahti, Finland	7.5 km Sprint	World Cup	2nd
8	2020–21	11 December 2020	Hochfilzen, Austria	7.5 km Sprint	World Cup	3rd
9	2020–21	17 January 2021	Oberhof, Germany	12.5 km Mass start	World Cup	2nd
10	2020–21	13 March 2021	Nové Město, Czech Republic	10 km Pursuit	World Cup	3rd
11	2020–21	21 March 2021	Östersund, Sweden	12.5 km Mass start	World Cup	3rd
12	2021–22	20 March 2022	Oslo Holmenkollen, Norway	12.5 km Mass start	World Cup	2nd
13	2023–24	26 November 2023	Östersund, Sweden	15 km Individual	World Cup	2nd
14	2023–24	3 December 2023	Östersund, Sweden	10 km Pursuit	World Cup	2nd
15	2023–24	5 January 2024	Oberhof, Germany	7.5 km Sprint	World Cup	2nd
16	2024–25	8 December 2024	Kontiolahti, Finland	12.5 km Mass start	World Cup	3rd
17	2024–25	13 December 2024	Hochfilzen, Austria	7.5 km Sprint	World Cup	1st
18	2024–25	14 December 2024	Hochfilzen, Austria	10 km Pursuit	World Cup	3rd
19	2024–25	20 December 2024	Annecy, France	7.5 km Sprint	World Cup	2nd
20	2024–25	21 December 2024	Annecy, France	10 km Pursuit	World Cup	1st
21	2024–25	22 December 2024	Annecy, France	12.5 km Mass Start	World Cup	2nd
22	2024–25	16 January 2025	Ruhpolding, Germany	15 km Individual	World Cup	2nd
23	2024–25	19 January 2025	Ruhpolding, Germany	12.5 km Mass Start	World Cup	2nd
24	2024–25	23 January 2025	Antholz, Italy	7.5 km Sprint	World Cup	3rd
25	2024–25	25 January 2025	Antholz, Italy	10 km Pursuit	World Cup	3rd
26	2024–25	14 February 2025	Lenzerheide, Switzerland	7.5 km Sprint	World Championships	2nd
27	2024–25	16 February 2025	Lenzerheide, Switzerland	10 km Pursuit	World Championships	1st
28	2024–25	13 March 2025	Pokljuka, Slovenia	12.5 km Short Individual	World Cup	3rd
29	2024–25	21 March 2025	Oslo Holmenkollen, Norway	7.5 km Sprint	World Cup	1st
30	2024–25	23 March 2025	Oslo Holmenkollen, Norway	12.5 km Mass Start	World Cup	1st
31	2025–26	23 January 2026	(Czech Republic) Nové Město, Czechia	12.5 km Short Individual	World Cup	3rd

=== Relay podiums ===
No.	Season	Date	Location	Level	Placement	Teammates
1	2013–14	7 December 2013	(Austria) Hochfilzen	Biathlon World Cup	2nd	Henkel / Hildebrand / Dahlmeier
2	2013–14	12 December 2013	(France) Annecy	Biathlon World Cup	1st	Henkel / Hildebrand / Dahlmeier
3	2013–14	8 January 2014	(Germany) Ruhpolding	Biathlon World Cup	1st	Sachenbacher-Stehle / Hildebrand / Dahlmeier
4	2014–15	30 November 2014	(Sweden) Östersund	Biathlon World Cup	3rd	Hildebrand / Peiffer / Schempp
5	2014–15	13 December 2014	(Austria) Hochfilzen	Biathlon World Cup	1st	Kummer / Hildebrand / Hinz
6	2014–15	14 January 2015	(Germany) Ruhpolding	Biathlon World Cup	3rd	Hildebrand / Hinz / Dahlmeier
7	2014–15	25 January 2015	(Italy) Antholz	Biathlon World Cup	1st	Kummer / Hildebrand / Dahlmeier
8	2014–15	13 March 2015	(Finland) Kontiolahti	World Championships	Gold	Hildebrand / Hinz / Dahlmeier
9	2015–16	13 December 2015	(Austria) Hochfilzen	Biathlon World Cup	2nd	Hildebrand/ Hinz / Hammerschmidt
10	2015–16	7 February 2016	(Canada) Canmore	Biathlon World Cup	1st	Hildebrand / Peiffer / Schempp
11	2015–16	13 February 2016	(United States) Presque Isle	Biathlon World Cup	3rd	Kummer / Neureuther / Horchler
12	2015–16	3 March 2016	(Norway) Oslo	World Championships	Silver	Hildebrand / Peiffer / Schempp
13	2015–16	11 March 2016	(Norway) Oslo	World Championships	Bronze	Hildebrand / Hammerschmidt / Dahlmeier
14	2016–17	27 November 2016	(Sweden) Östersund	Biathlon World Cup	3rd	Lesser
15	2016–17	12 January 2017	(Germany) Ruhpolding	Biathlon World Cup	1st	Hinz / Hammerschmidt / Dahlmeier
16	2017–18	26 November 2017	(Sweden) Östersund	Biathlon World Cup	3rd	Hammerschmidt / Doll / Peiffer
17	2017–18	7 January 2018	(Germany) Oberhof	Biathlon World Cup	2nd	Hinz / Herrmann / Hammerschmidt
18	2017–18	13 January 2018	(Germany) Ruhpolding	Biathlon World Cup	1st	Herrmann / Hildebrand / Dahlmeier
19	2017–18	17 March 2018	(Norway) Holmenkollen	Biathlon World Cup	2nd	Hammerschmidt / Herrmann/ Dahlmeier
20	2018–19	13 January 2019	(Germany) Oberhof	Biathlon World Cup	2nd	Horchler / Hildebrand / Herrmann
21	2018–19	19 January 2019	(Germany) Ruhpolding	Biathlon World Cup	3rd	Hinz / Dahlmeier / Herrmann
22	2019–20	30 November 2019	(Sweden) Östersund	Biathlon World Cup	2nd	Lesser
23	2019–20	20 February 2020	(Italy) Antholz	World Championships	Silver	Lesser
24	2019–20	22 February 2020	(Italy) Antholz	World Championships	Silver	Horchler / Hinz / Herrmann
25	2019–20	7 March 2020	(Czech Republic) Nové Město	Biathlon World Cup	3rd	Horchler / Hinz / Herrmann
26	2020–21	5 December 2020	(Finland) Kontiolahti	Biathlon World Cup	3rd	Hinz / Hammerschmidt / Herrmann
27	2020–21	16 January 2021	(Germany) Oberhof	Biathlon World Cup	1st	Hinz / Hettich / Herrmann
28	2020–21	24 January 2021	(Italy) Antholz	Biathlon World Cup	2nd	Hinz / Hettich / Herrmann
29	2020–21	20 February 2021	(Slovenia) Pokljuka	World Championships	Silver	Hinz / Hettich / Herrmann
30	2021–22	16 February 2022	(China) Beijing	Winter Olympic Games	Bronze	Voigt / Hinz / Herrmann
31	2021–22	13 March 2022	(Estonia) Otepää	Biathlon World Cup	3rd	Lesser
32	2023–24	29 November 2023	(Sweden) Östersund	Biathlon World Cup	3rd	Hettich-Walz / Grotian / Voigt
33	2023–24	10 January 2024	(Germany) Ruhpolding	Biathlon World Cup	3rd	Hettich-Walz / Schneider / Kebinger
34	2024–25	15 December 2024	(Austria) Hochfilzen	Biathlon World Cup	1st	Voigt / Tannheimer / Grotian
35	2024–25	18 January 2025	(Germany) Ruhpolding	Biathlon World Cup	1st	Scherer / Grotian / Schneider
36	2024–25	12 February 2025	(Switzerland) Lenzerheide	World Championships	3rd	Grotian / Nawrath / Strelow
37	2024–25	20 February 2025	(Switzerland) Lenzerheide	World Championships	3rd	Strelow
38	2025–26	10 January 2026	(Germany) Oberhof	Biathlon World Cup	3rd	Grotian / Tannheimer / Hettich-Walz
39	2025–26	8 February 2026	(Italy) Antholz	Winter Olympic Games	3rd	Strelow / Nawrath / Voigt
