= Anna Gandler =

Austrian biathlete (born 2001)

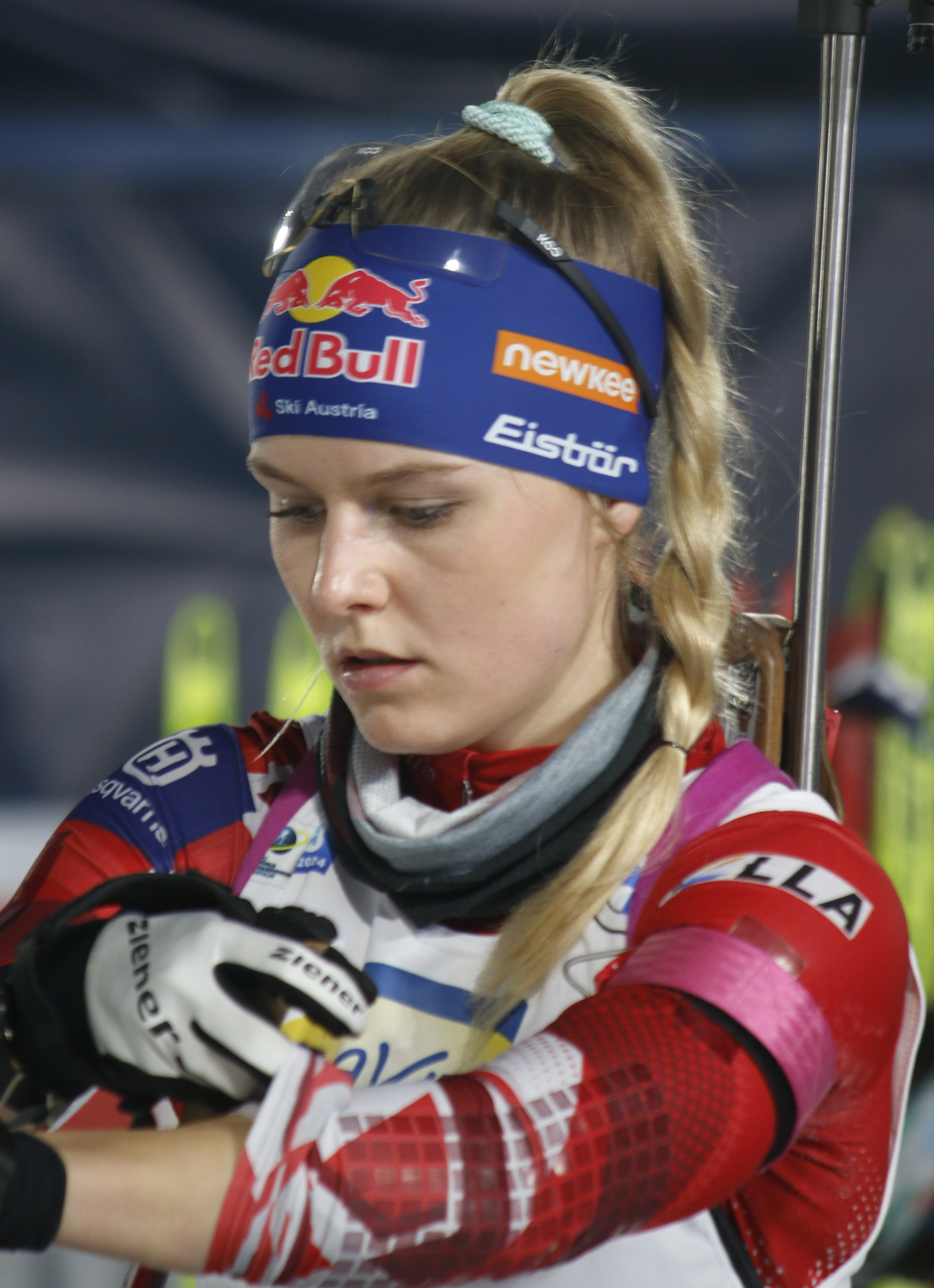
- Gandler in 2024

Personal information
- Nationality: Austrian
- Born: 5 January 2001 (age 25) Hall in Tirol, Austria

Sport

Professional information
- Sport: Biathlon
- IBU Cup debut: 2020
- World Cup debut: 2022

World Championships
- Teams: 1 (2023)

World Cup
- Seasons: 2 (2022/23-)

European/IBU Cup
- Seasons: 4 (2019/20-2022/23)
Medal record
Women's biathlon
Representing Austria
Junior World Championships
Gold medal – first place	2020 Lenzerheide	7.5 km pursuit
Silver medal – second place	2017 Brezno-Osrblie	6 km sprint
Bronze medal – third place	2020 Lenzerheide	10 km individual
Bronze medal – third place	2021 Obertilliach	4 × 6 km relay

Anna Gandler (born 5 January 2001) is an Austrian biathlete. She has competed in the Biathlon World Cup since 2022.

== Career ==
She made her first international appearance in 2017, competing at the Junior World Championships in Osrblie. There she won the silver medal in the sprint. At the Junior World Championships in Lenzerheide, held three years later, she won the pursuit race and was third in the individual race. In addition, she won the bronze medal in the relay at the Junior World Championships in Obertilliach in 2021.

She made her World Cup debut on 8 December 2022 in Hochfilzen, finishing 51st in the sprint. She won her first points two days later at the same venue, finishing the pursuit run in 30th place. On 8 March 2024 at the 2023-24 World Cup at Soldier Hollow, she made her first appearance in the flower ceremony, finishing in 6th place in sprint.

== Personal life ==
She is the daughter of Markus Gandler, a former cross-country skier and silver medallist in the 10km classic at the Nagano Olympics in 1998. She is the partner of French biathlete Émilien Claude.

== Biathlon results ==
All results are sourced from the International Biathlon Union.

=== World Championships ===
Event	Individual	Sprint	Pursuit	Mass start	Relay	Mixed relay	Single mixed relay
(Germany) 2023 Oberhof	24th	49th	29th	—	5th	—	—
(Czech Republic) 2024 Nové Město	19th	11th	12th	7th	8th	6th	—
(Switzerland) 2025 Lenzerheide	—	33rd	DNS	—	—	17th	—

=== World Cup ===
World Cup rankings

Season	Overall		Individual		Sprint		Pursuit		Mass start	
Season	Points	Position	Points	Position	Points	Position	Points	Position	Points	Position
2022–23	177	32nd	-	-	66	35th	53	35th	58	26th

=== Youth and Junior World Championships ===
4 medals (1 gold, 1 silver, 2 bronze)

Year	Age	Individual	Sprint	Pursuit	Relay
(Slovakia) 2017 Brezno-Osrblie	16	11th	Silver	20th	11th
(Estonia) 2018 Otepää	17	25th	11th	11th	—N/a
(Slovakia) 2019 Brezno-Osrblie	18	—N/a	4th	9th	—N/a
(Switzerland) 2020 Lenzerheide	19	Bronze	4th	Gold	6th
(Austria) 2021 Obertilliach	20	12nd	28th	27th	Bronze
