= Jonáš Mareček =

Czech biathlete (born 2000)

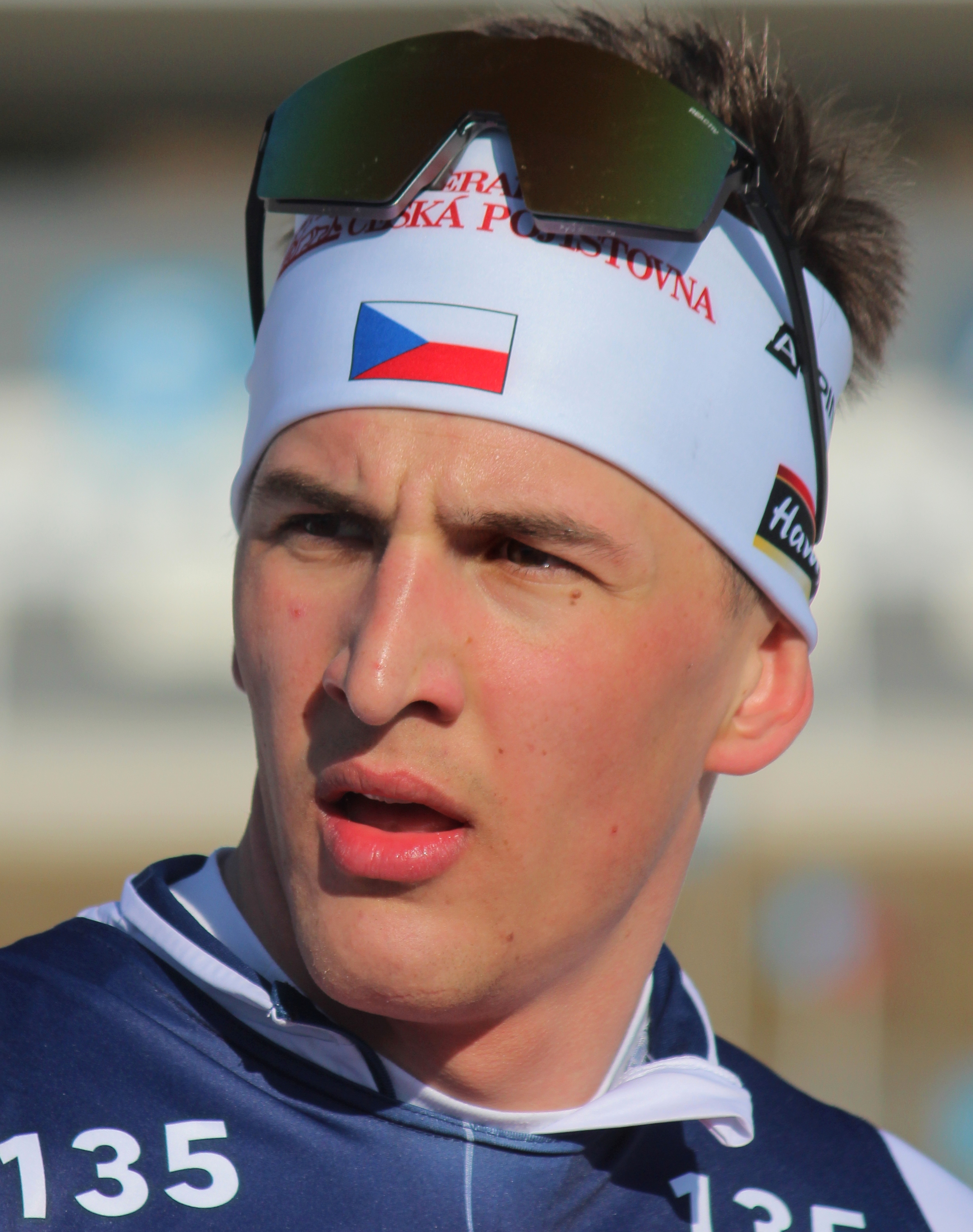
- Mareček in 2023

Personal information
- Nationality: Czech
- Born: 13 February 2001 (age 25) Nové Město na Moravě, Czech Republic

Sport
- Country: Czech Republic
- Sport: Biathlon
Medal record
Men's biathlon
Representing Czech Republic
Junior World Championships
Gold medal – first place	2022 Soldier Hollow	15 km individual
Bronze medal – third place	2021 Obertilliach	4 × 7.5 km relay
Youth World Championships
Silver medal – second place	2020 Lenzerheide	3 × 7.5 km relay

Jonáš Mareček (born 13 February 2001) is a Czech biathlete. He made his debut in the Biathlon World Cup in 2021.

== Career ==
Mareček has been involved in biathlon since 2010. He made his World Cup debut in January 2021 in the relay race in Oberhof. He participated in an individual World Cup race for the first time in March 2022 in Otepää, where he finished 48th in the sprint with one shooting miss. His best result is 22nd place in the pursuit race in Hochfilzen in December 2024. The greatest achievements of his career to date are winning the individual race at the 2022 Junior World Championships and the sprint at the 2022 Junior European Championships. He was awarded 2nd place in the Vysočina Region Athlete of the Year poll in 2021 in the Junior Boys category. He was also recognized in the Vysočina Region Athlete of the Year poll in 2022 in the Junior Boys category.

== Biathlon results ==
All results are sourced from the International Biathlon Union.

=== World Championships ===
Event	Individual	Sprint	Pursuit	Mass start	Relay	Single Mixed relay
(Germany) 2023 Oberhof	76th	68th	—	—	4th	—
(Czech Republic) 2024 Nové Město	—	58th	DNS	—	7th	10th
(Switzerland) 2025 Lenzerheide	83rd	38th	29th	—	6th	—

=== World Cup ===
Season	Overall			Individual		Sprint		Pursuit		Mass start	
Season	Races	Points	Position	Points	Position	Points	Position	Points	Position	Points	Position
2021–22	2/22	Did not earn World Cup points									
2022–23	10/21	17	77th	9	56th	8	75th	—	—	—	—
2023–24	15/21	30	64th	13	50th	2	72nd	15	55th	—	—

=== Youth and Junior World Championships ===
3 medals (1 gold, 1 silver, 1 bronze)

Year	Age	Individual	Sprint	Pursuit	Relay
(Estonia) 2018 Otepää	17	58th	—	—	11th
(Switzerland) 2020 Lenzerheide	19	4th	11th	6th	Silver
(Austria) 2021 Obertilliach	20	5th	DNS	—	Bronze
(United States) 2022 Soldier Hollow	21	Gold	23th	6th	4th
