= Milena Todorova =

Bulgarian biathlete (born 1998)

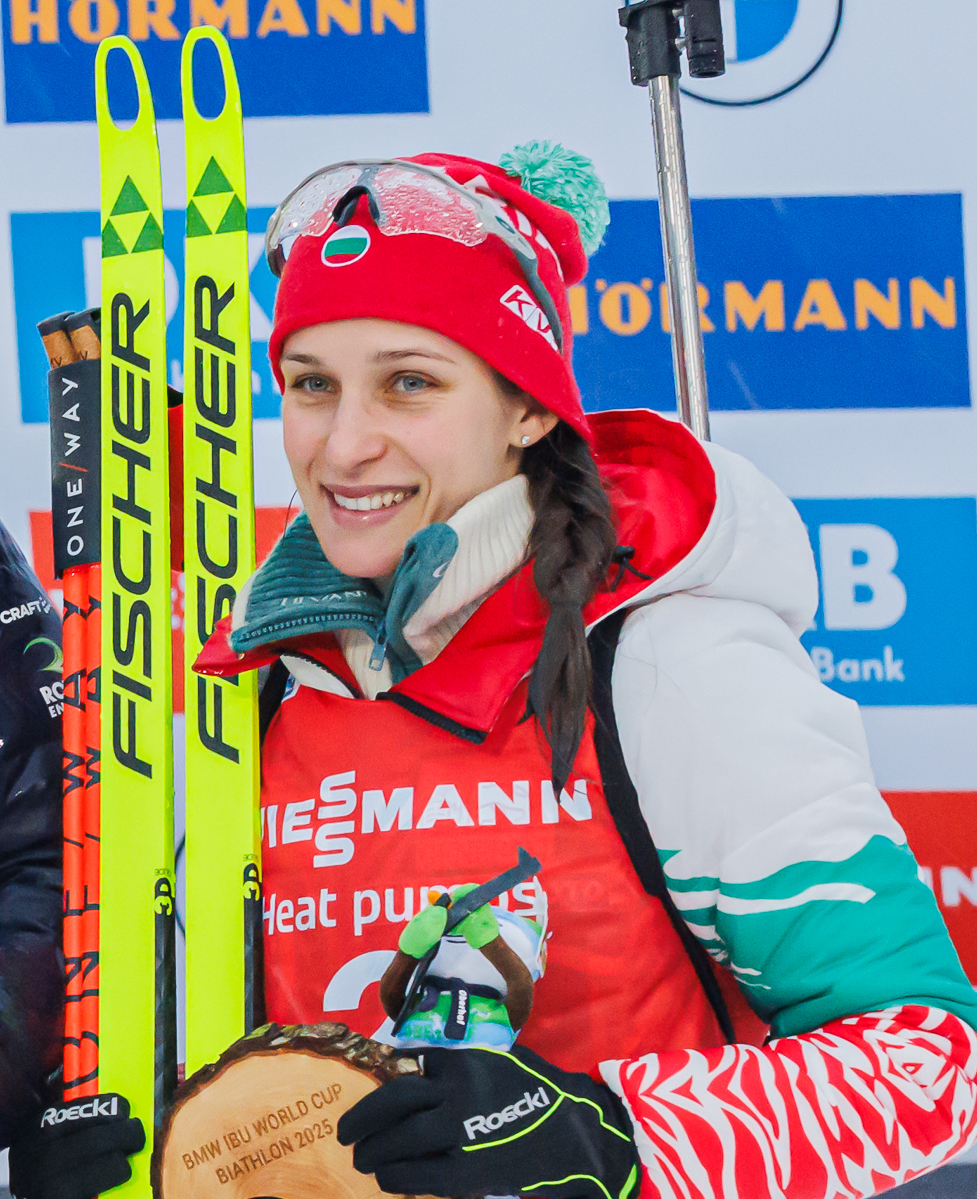
- Todorova in 2025

Personal information
- Full name: Milena Kamenova Todorova
- Born: 18 January 1998 (age 28) Troyan, Bulgaria

Sport
- Country: Bulgaria
- Sport: Biathlon
Medal record
Women's biathlon
Representing Bulgaria
Junior World Championships
| Silver medal – second place | 2020 Lenzerheide | 12.5 km individual |
| Bronze medal – third place | 2020 Lenzerheide | 7.5 km sprint |
| Bronze medal – third place | 2020 Lenzerheide | 10 km pursuit |

Milena Kamenova Todorova (Bulgarian: Милена Каменова Тодорова) (born 18 January 1998) is a Bulgarian biathlete. She competed in the 2018 Winter Olympics, the Beijing Winter Olympics and the Milano-Cortina Winter Olympics.

== Biathlon results ==
All results are sourced from the International Biathlon Union.

=== Olympic Games ===
0 medals

| Event | Individual | Sprint | Pursuit | Mass start | Relay | Mixed relay |
|---|---|---|---|---|---|---|
| (South Korea) 2018 Pyeongchang | — | 84th | — | — | — | — |
| (China) 2022 Beijing | 52nd | 17th | 31st | — | 18th | 19th |
| (Italy) 2026 Milano-Cortina | 59th | 4th | 14th | 20th | 12th | 16th |

=== World Championships ===
0 medals

| Event | Individual | Sprint | Pursuit | Mass start | Relay | Mixed relay | Single mixed relay |
|---|---|---|---|---|---|---|---|
| (Sweden) 2019 Östersund | — | — | — | — | 20th | — | — |
| (Italy) 2020 Antholz | 17th | 27th | 18th | 28th | 20th | — | — |
| (Slovenia) 2021 Pokljuka | 54th | 48th | 58th | – | 18th | 15th | 19th |
| (Germany) 2023 Oberhof | 36th | 31st | 31st | – | – | 17th | – |
| (Switzerland) 2025 Lenzerheide | 63rd | 14th | 16th | 5th | 21st | 15th | — |

=== World Cup ===
==== Individual podiums ====
| No. | Season | Date | Location | Level | Race | Place |
|---|---|---|---|---|---|---|
| 1 | 2024–25 | 9 January 2025 | (Germany) Oberhof | World Cup | Sprint | 3rd |
| 2 | 2024–25 | 15 March 2025 | (Slovenia) Pokljuka | World Cup | Mass Start | 2nd |
