= Biathlon Junior World Championships 2020 =

Biathlon competition

2020 IBU Youth & Junior World Championships
- Host city: Lenzerheide, Switzerland
- Dates: 26 January – 2 February
- Events: 16
- Website: lenzerheide2020.ch

The 2020 Biathlon Junior World Championships were held in Lenzerheide, Switzerland from 26 January to 2 February 2020. There was a total of 16 competitions: sprint, pursuit, individual and relay races for men and women.

== Schedule ==
All times are local (UTC+1).

Date	Time	Event
26 January	11:00	Youth Men's 12.5 km individual
26 January	14:00	Youth Women's 10 km individual
27 January	11:00	Junior Men's 15 km individual
27 January	14:00	Junior Women's 12.5 km individual
28 January	11:00	Youth Men's 3 × 7.5 km relay
28 January	15:00	Youth Women's 3 × 6 km relay
29 January	11:00	Junior Men's 4 × 7.5 km relay
29 January	14:00	Junior Women's 4 × 6 km relay
31 January	11:00	Youth Men's 7.5 km sprint
31 January	14:00	Youth Women's 6 km sprint
1 February	11:00	Junior Men's 10 km sprint
1 February	14:00	Junior Women's 7.5 km sprint
2 February	11:00	Youth Men's 10 km pursuit
2 February	12:00	Youth Women's 7.5 km pursuit
2 February	14:15	Junior Men's 12.5 km pursuit
2 February	15:20	Junior Women's 10 km pursuit

== Results ==
=== Junior events ===
==== Junior Men ====
Event	Gold		Silver		Bronze	
15 km Individual details	Max Barchewitz; Germany	40:15.8 (0+0+0+0)	Vebjørn Sørum; Norway	40:34.5 (0+1+0+1)	Sebastian Stalder; Switzerland	41:02.5 (0+0+0+1)
10 km Sprint details	Vebjørn Sørum; Norway	24:02.7 (0+1)	Jakub Štvrtecký; Czech Republic	24:27.8 (0+0)	Dzmitry Lazouski; Belarus	24:34.2 (0+0)
12.5 km Pursuit details	Danilo Riethmüller; Germany	35:34.2 (1+0+2+0)	Said Karimulla Khalili; Russia	35:34.8 (1+2+1+1)	Alex Cisar; Slovenia	35:35.4 (1+0+0+0)
4 × 7.5 km Relay details	Russia; Kirill Bazhin; Daniil Serokhvostov; Vadim Istamgulov; Said Karimulla Khalili	1:32:07.7 (0+0) (0+1) (0+3) (1+3) (0+2) (0+2) (0+2) (0+2)	Germany; Max Barchewitz; Tim Grotian; Julian Hollandt; Danilo Riethmüller	1:32:27.7 (0+0) (0+0) (0+0) (0+0) (0+0) (0+1) (0+1) (0+1)	France; Thomas Briffaz; Guillaume Desmus; Martin Bourgeois République; Sébastien Mahon	1:32:32.6 (0+2) (0+0) (0+2) (0+2) (0+0) (0+1) (0+0) (0+3)

==== Junior Women ====
Event	Gold		Silver		Bronze	
12.5 km Individual details	Anastasiia Khaliullina; Russia	41:32.6 (0+0+0+0)	Milena Todorova; Bulgaria	42:40.5 (0+2+1+0)	Amy Baserga; Switzerland	42:48.6 (0+1+0+1)
7.5 km Sprint details	Anastasia Shevchenko; Russia	23:19.3 (0+0)	Åsne Skrede; Norway	24:00.2 (0+1)	Milena Todorova; Bulgaria	24:07.7 (1+2)
10 km Pursuit details	Anastasia Shevchenko; Russia	30:45.7 (0+0+0+0)	Åsne Skrede; Norway	31:00.7 (0+1+0+0)	Milena Todorova; Bulgaria	31:34.1 (0+0+2+0)
4 × 6 km Relay details	France; Camille Bened; Laura Boucaud; Lou Anne Chevat; Paula Botet	1:22:49.5 (0+1) (0+0) (0+3) (0+1) (0+1) (0+2) (0+0) (0+0)	Russia; Anastasiia Khaliullina; Anastasiia Goreeva; Alina Kudisova; Anastasia Shevchenko	1:23:04.9 (0+1) (0+0) (0+0) (0+0) (0+1) (1+3) (0+1) (0+1)	Norway; Åsne Skrede; Mari Wetterhus; Marthe Kråkstad Johansen; Juni Arnekleiv	1:24:57.5 (0+0) (0+2) (0+0) (0+0) (0+0) (0+1) (0+2) (0+1)

=== Youth events ===
==== Youth Men ====
Event	Gold		Silver		Bronze	
12.5 km Individual details	Martin Nevland; Norway	36:36.4 (1+1+1+0)	Damien Levet; France	36:49.3 (1+0+0+0)	Éric Perrot; France	37:07.1 (0+1+0+1)
7.5 km Sprint details	Aleksei Kovalev; Russia	19:53.0 (0+0)	Ondřej Mánek; Czech Republic	20:02.3 (0+0)	Maxime Germain; United States	20:04.3 (1+0)
10 km Pursuit details	Martin Nevland; Norway	26:28.0 (1+0+0+0)	Ondřej Mánek; Czech Republic	26:53.4 (0+0+0+0)	Lovro Planko; Slovenia	27:20.0 (1+2+0+0)
3 × 7.5 km Relay details	Norway; Martin Uldal; Morten Tørnblad Sameien; Martin Nevland	1:04:07.0 (0+0) (0+3) (0+0) (0+2) (0+0) (0+1)	Czech Republic; Ondřej Mánek; Josef Kabrda; Jonáš Mareček	1:05:22.7 (0+1) (0+2) (0+1) (0+3) (0+1) (0+1)	Russia; Aleksei Zubarev; Oleg Domichek; Aleksei Kovalev	1:05:44.5 (0+2) (0+1) (0+1) (0+2) (0+2) (0+2)

==== Youth Women ====
Event	Gold		Silver		Bronze	
10 km Individual details	Lea Meier; Switzerland	33:52.4 (0+1+1+0)	Rebecca Passler; Italy	34:05.1 (0+0+1+2)	Anna Gandler; Austria	34:08.8 (0+2+0+1)
6 km Sprint details	Linda Zingerle; Italy	17:44.7 (0+1)	Liubov Kalinina; Russia	18:05.5 (0+0)	Océane Michelon; France	18:06.0 (1+1)
7.5 km Pursuit details	Anna Gandler; Austria	22:01.2 (0+0+1+0)	Camille Coupé; France	22:02.4 (0+1+0+0)	Linda Zingerle; Italy	22:16.2 (1+0+1+1)
3 × 6 km Relay details	Norway; Tuva Aas Stræte; Frida Dokken; Maren Bakken	1:02:11.2 (0+0) (0+1) (0+1) (0+2) (0+1) (0+0)	Italy; Hannah Auchentaller; Linda Zingerle; Rebecca Passler	1:02:12.6 (0+1) (0+3) (0+1) (0+3) (0+1) (0+1)	Germany; Emilie Behringer; Johanna Puff; Selina Kastl	1:02:32.0 (0+3) (0+0) (0+1) (0+0) (0+0) (0+0)

== Medal table ==
* Host nation (Switzerland)

Rank	Nation	Gold	Silver	Bronze	Total
1	Norway (NOR)	5	3	1	9
1	Russia (RUS)	5	3	1	9
3	Germany (GER)	2	1	1	4
4	France (FRA)	1	2	3	6
5	Italy (ITA)	1	2	1	4
6	Switzerland (SUI)*	1	0	2	3
7	Austria (AUT)	1	0	1	2
8	Czech Republic (CZE)	0	4	0	4
9	Bulgaria (BUL)	0	1	2	3
10	Slovenia (SLO)	0	0	2	2
11	Belarus (BLR)	0	0	1	1
11	United States (USA)	0	0	1	1
Totals (12 entries)		16	16	16	48
