= Julia Tannheimer =

German biathlete (born 2005)

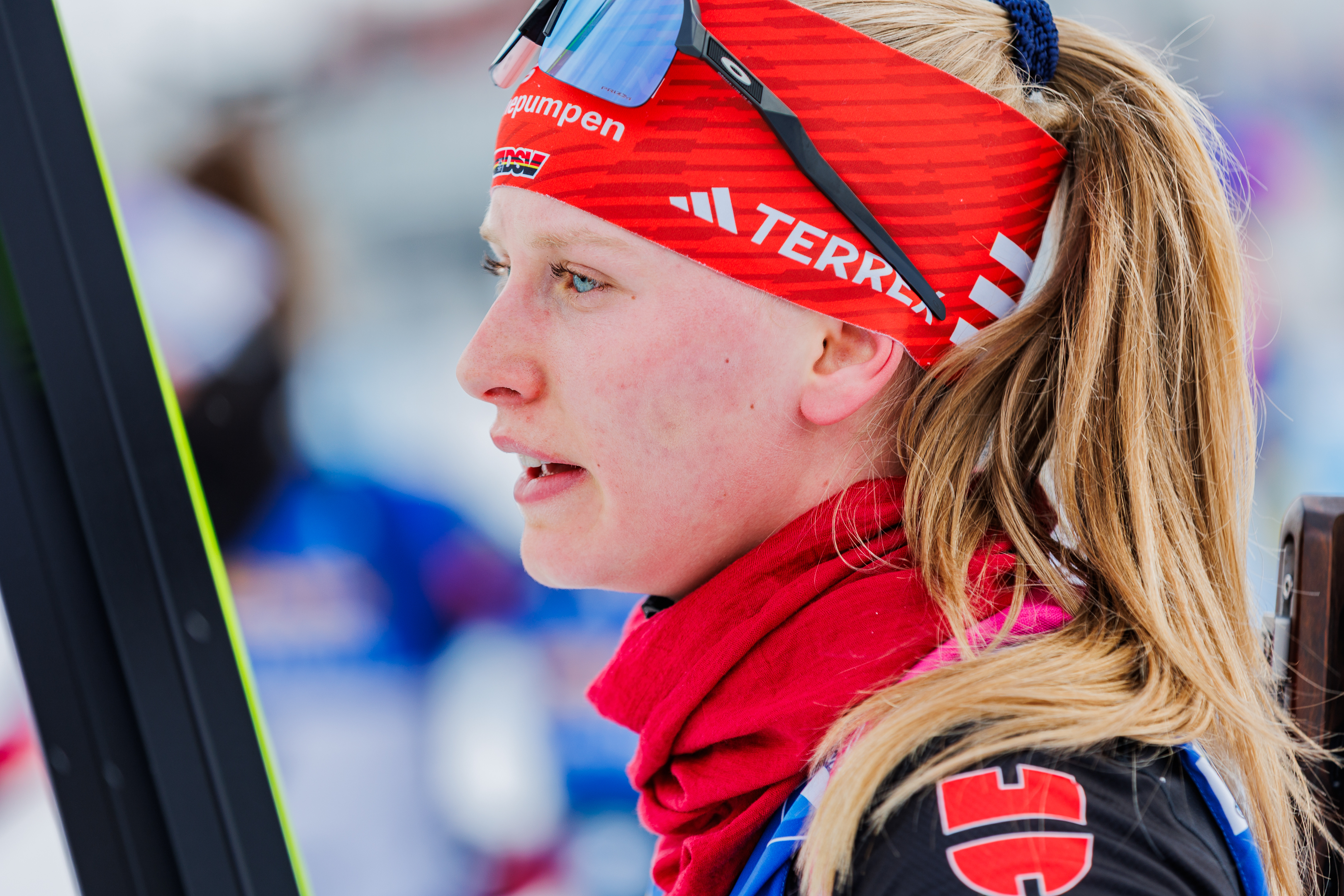

Personal information
- Nationality: German
- Born: 1 August 2005 (age 20) Ulm, Germany

Sport

World Championships
- Teams: 1 (2025)
- Medals: 0 (0 gold)

World Cup
- Seasons: 2 (2023/24–)
- Individual victories: 0
- All victories: 1
- Individual podiums: 0
- All podiums: 1
Medal record
Women's biathlon
Representing Germany
Junior World Championships
Gold medal – first place	2024 Otepää	12.5 km individual
Gold medal – first place	2024 Otepää	4 × 6 km relay
Silver medal – second place	2024 Otepää	7.5 km sprint
Silver medal – second place	2024 Otepää	4 × 6 km mixed relay
Youth World Championships
Gold medal – first place	2023 Shchuchinsk	6 km sprint
Gold medal – first place	2023 Shchuchinsk	7.5 km pursuit
Gold medal – first place	2023 Shchuchinsk	3 × 6 km relay
Silver medal – second place	2023 Shchuchinsk	4 × 6 km mixed relay
- Updated on 19 April 2024

Julia Tannheimer (born 1 August 2005) is a German biathlete. She made her debut in the Biathlon World Cup in 2024.

== Career ==
Julia Tannheimer made her international debut at the 2022 Youth World Championships in Soldier Hollow, Utah. She impressed on the ski track but missed out on the medal positions due to some shooting misses. During the winter of 2022/23, she competed in the IBU Junior Cup in Obertilliach, finishing sixth once. She also participated in the Youth Olympic Festival in Forni Avoltri, where she won gold in the individual event and silver in the mixed relay. Tannheimer excelled at the 2023 Youth World Championships, winning convincingly in the sprint and pursuit with the fastest times. She also contributed to the victory of the women's relay alongside Lea Zimmermann and Julia Kink. At the start of the 2023/24 season, Tannheimer made her debut in the IBU Cup. After two top-ten finishes in Idre, she achieved a remarkable feat in Sjusjøen, winning the mass start 60 despite three shooting misses, becoming the youngest winner of an IBU Cup individual competition in history at 18 years and 137 days old.

On January 12, 2024, Julia Tannheimer made her debut in the Biathlon World Cup at the sprint event in Ruhpolding. In a race without shooting misses, she finished 15th, earning points and qualifying for the pursuit race. In the pursuit race, she finished 33rd, once again earning points.

== Biathlon results ==
All results are sourced from the International Biathlon Union.

=== Olympic Games ===
Year	Individual	Sprint	Pursuit	Mass start	Relay	Mixed relay
(Italy) 2026 Milano Cortina	—	20th	34th	—	4th	—

=== World Championships ===
Year	Individual	Sprint	Pursuit	Mass start	Relay	Mixed relay	Single mixed relay
(Switzerland) 2025 Lenzerheide	33rd	17th	24th	15th	5th	—	—

=== World Cup ===
Season	Overall		Individual		Sprint		Pursuit		Mass start	
Season	Points	Position	Points	Position	Points	Position	Points	Position	Points	Position
2023–24	34	67th	—	—	26	53rd	8	71st	—	—
2024–25	232	31st	—	—	104	27th	78	28th	50	30th
2025–26	306	23rd	13	60th	129	15th	137	14th	27	38th

==== Relay podiums ====
No.	Season	Date	Location	Level	Teammates
1	2024–25	15 December 2024	(Austria) Hochfilzen	Biathlon World Cup	Voigt / Grotian / Preuß

=== Youth and Junior World Championships ===
8 medals (5 gold, 3 silver)

Year	Age	Individual	Sprint	Pursuit	Mass Start	Relay	Mixed relay
(United States) 2022 Soldier Hollow	16	5th	9th	8th	N/A	—	N/A
(Kazakhstan) 2023 Shchuchinsk	17	15th	Gold	Gold	N/A	Gold	Silver
(Estonia) 2024 Otepää	18	Gold	Silver	N/A	11th	Silver	Gold
