= Selina Grotian =

German biathlete (born 2004)

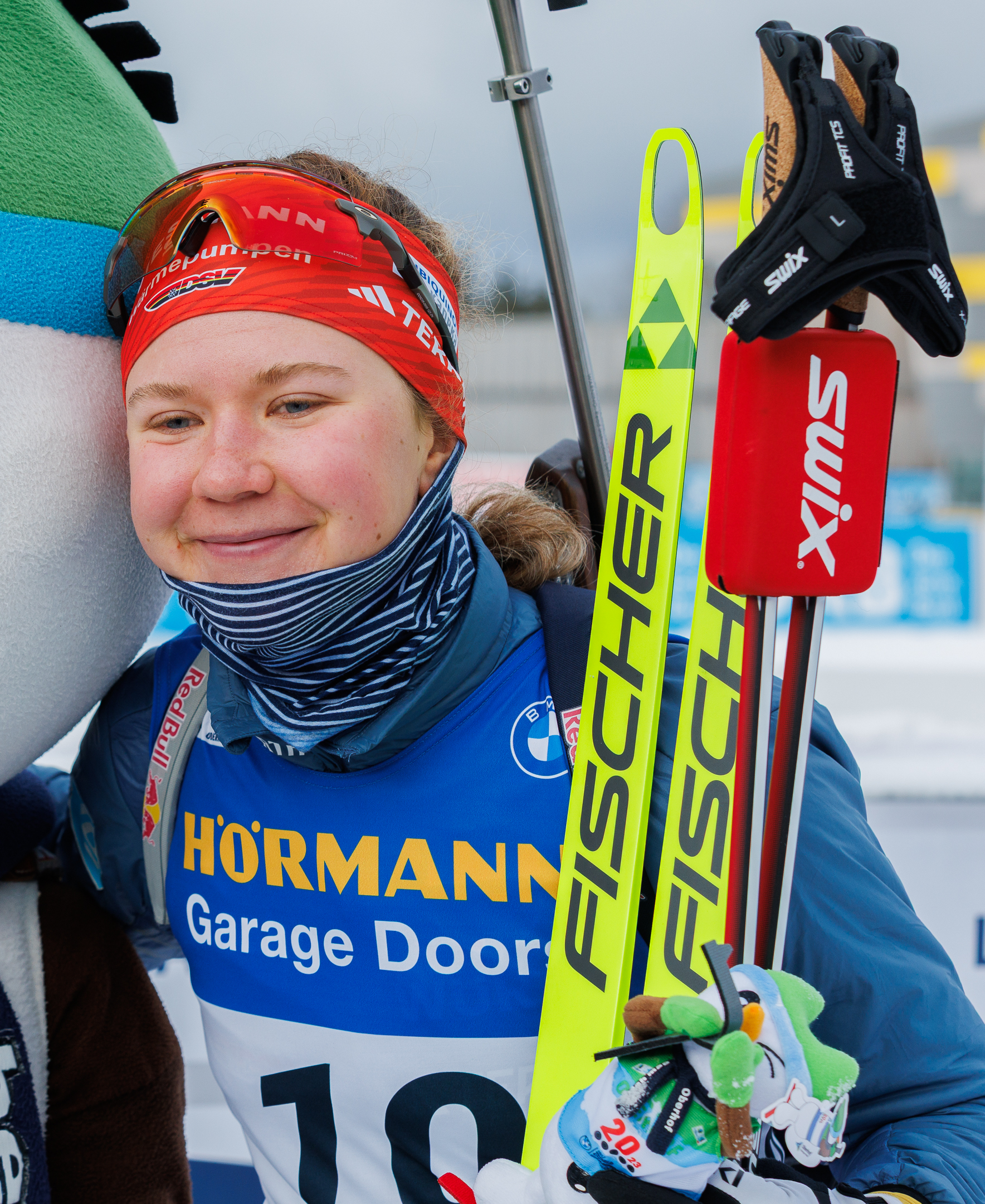
- Grotian in 2025

Personal information
- Nationality: German
- Born: 25 March 2004 (age 22) Garmisch-Partenkirchen, Germany

Sport

Professional information
- Club: SC Mittenwald

World Championships
- Teams: 2 (2024, 2025)
- Medals: 2 (0 gold)

World Cup
- Seasons: 2023–
- Individual victories: 1
- All victories: 3
- Individual podiums: 2
- All podiums: 9
Medal record
Women's biathlon
Representing Germany
World Championships
Bronze medal – third place	2024 Nové Město	4 × 6 km relay
Bronze medal – third place	2025 Lenzerheide	Mixed relay
European Championships
Gold medal – first place	2023 Lenzerheide	10 km pursuit
Silver medal – second place	2023 Lenzerheide	Mixed relay
Bronze medal – third place	2023 Lenzerheide	15 km individual
Junior World Championships
Gold medal – first place	2023 Shchuchinsk	7.5 km sprint
Gold medal – first place	2023 Shchuchinsk	10 km pursuit
Gold medal – first place	2023 Shchuchinsk	4 × 6 km relay
Gold medal – first place	2023 Shchuchinsk	Mixed relay
Youth World Championships
Gold medal – first place	2022 Soldier Hollow	7.5 km pursuit
Silver medal – second place	2022 Soldier Hollow	3 × 6 km relay
Bronze medal – third place	2021 Obertilliach	6 km sprint
Bronze medal – third place	2022 Soldier Hollow	10 km individual

Selina Grotian (born 25 March 2004) is a German biathlete. She won multiple gold medals at youth and junior world championships in 2022 and 2023, respectively. In the 2023 European Championships in Lenzerheide, Switzerland, she won the gold medal in the pursuit race.

== Career ==
Selina Grotian started her cross-country skiing at the age of six, and biathlon at the age of nine following in her two older brothers footsteps. She competes for the Skiclub Mittenwald, her hometown, and is trained by Bernhard Kröll, Albert Neuner and Benedikt Ertl at the biathlon base of the Skigau Werdenfels in Kaltenbrunn.

For the 2020–21 season, she was introduced to the junior squad by the German Ski Association. In the same season, she qualified for the Youth and Junior World Championships in Obertilliach after winning internal qualifications. There she won bronze in the sprint. In addition, she took eleventh in singles, eighth in the pursuit and fourth in the team relay.

For the 2021–22 season, she made her debut in the IBU Junior Cup in Pokljuka, Slovenia. In the first race of the season, she narrowly missed victory by just 0.8 seconds. The following week, Grotian won the gold medal in the sprint and then also in the pursuit at the European Junior Championships taking place in the same place with the best running time. At the 2022 World Junior Biathlon Championships in Soldier Hollow, USA, Grotian participated at the youth age group, winning a bronze in individual race. In the sprint she missed a medal with 4th place and subsequent pursuit race, she achieved the gold medal. Concluding the tournament, she finished the competition as the most successful youth athlete with the silver medal in the team relay race.

For the 2022/23 season, Selina Grotian has been accepted by the German Ski Association into the junior team, although she is still in the youth class. At the beginning of the season, she qualified for the German IBU Cup team and made her debut at the senior level in Idre, Sweden. There she won her first career victory at the senior level in the sprint race. At the highlight of the IBU Cup season, Grotian won the pursuit race of the European Biathlon Championships in Lenzerheide, Switzerland. In addition, she achieved the silver medal in the mixed relay and bronze in the individual. At the 2023 World Junior Biathlon Championships, she won four gold medals in women's sprint, pursuit, relay, and mixed-relay races in Shchuchinsk, Kazakhstan. After successful races at IBU cup competitions and junior world championships, she made her IBU World cup debut race in sprint discipline on 18 March 2023 in Oslo, Norway. However, she missed two targets on stand shooting even though didn't miss a target on prone shooting and took 44th place.

== Biathlon results ==
All results are sourced from the International Biathlon Union.

=== Olympic Games ===
0 medals

Year	Individual	Sprint	Pursuit	Mass start	Relay	Mixed relay
(Italy) 2026 Milano Cortina	55th	52nd	41st	—	—	—

=== World Championships ===
2 medals (2 bronze)

Year	Individual	Sprint	Pursuit	Mass start	Relay	Mixed relay	Single mixed relay
(Czech Republic) 2024 Nové Město	4th	—	—	30th	Bronze	—	—
(Switzerland) 2025 Lenzerheide	46th	24th	10th	27th	5th	Bronze	—

*During Olympic seasons competitions are only held for those events not included in the Olympic program.
**The single mixed relay was added as an event in 2019.

=== European Championships ===
3 medals (1 gold, 1 silver, 1 bronze)

Year	Age	Individual	Sprint	Pursuit	Mixed relay	Single mixed relay
(Switzerland) 2023 Lenzerheide	18	Bronze	5th	Gold	Silver	—

=== World Cup ===
Season	Age	Overall	Individual	Sprint	Pursuit	Mass start
2023–24	19	29th	56th	22nd	28th	34th
2024–25	20	9th	26th	6th	8th	7th
2025–26	21	35th	46th	38th	30th	29th

=== Youth and Junior World Championships ===
8 medals (5 gold, 1 silver, 2 bronze)

Year	Age	Individual	Sprint	Pursuit	Relay	Mixed relay
(Austria) 2021 Obertilliach	17	11th	Bronze	8th	4th	—N/a
(United States) 2022 Soldier Hollow	18	Bronze	4th	Gold	Silver	—N/a
(Kazakhstan) 2023 Shchuchinsk	19	5th	Gold	Gold	Gold	Gold

=== Individual victories ===
- 1 victories (1 Ms)
- 1 podium (1 Ms)

No.	Season	Date	Location	Race	Level
1	2024–25	22 December 2024	Annecy, France	12.5 km Mass Start	World Cup

=== Relay victories ===
No.	Season	Date	Location	Level	Teammates
1	2024–25	15 December 2024	(Austria) Hochfilzen	Biathlon World Cup	Voigt / Tannheimer / Preuß
2	2024–25	18 January 2025	(Germany) Ruhpolding	Biathlon World Cup	Scherer / Schneider / Preuß
