= Biathlon World Championships 2025 =

Biathlon World Championship edition

- Host city: Lenzerheide
- Country: Switzerland
- Sport: Biathlon
- Opening: 12 February
- Closing: 23 February
- Main venue: Roland Arena

The 2025 Biathlon World Championships took place from 12 to 23 February 2025 at the Roland Arena in Lenzerheide, Switzerland.

The event was the highlight of the 2024–25 Biathlon World Cup, but was not included in its rankings (except for the national rankings). There were a total of 12 competitions: sprint, pursuit, individual, mass start and relay races for both men, women, single mixed relay and a mixed relay.

== Schedule ==
All times are local (UTC+1).

Date	Time	Event
12 February	14:30	4 × 6 km W+M mixed relay
14 February	15:05	Women's 7.5 km sprint
15 February	15:05	Men's 10 km sprint
16 February	12:05	Women's 10 km pursuit
16 February	15:05	Men's 12.5 km pursuit
18 February	15:05	Women's 15 km individual
19 February	15:05	Men's 20 km individual
20 February	16:05	6 km W + 7.5 km M single mixed relay
22 February	12:05	Women's 4 × 6 km relay
22 February	15:05	Men's 4 × 7.5 km relay
23 February	13:45	Women's 12.5 km mass start
23 February	16:05	Men's 15 km mass start

== Medal summary ==
=== Medal table ===
* Host nation (Switzerland)

Rank	Nation	Gold	Silver	Bronze	Total
1	France	6	2	5	13
2	Norway	4	3	2	9
3	Sweden	1	2	1	4
4	Germany	1	1	3	5
5	United States	0	2	0	2
6	Czech Republic	0	1	0	1
6	Italy	0	1	0	1
8	Finland	0	0	1	1
Totals (8 entries)		12	12	12	36

=== Men ===
Event	Gold		Silver		Bronze	
10 km sprint	Johannes Thingnes Bø; Norway	21:56.8 (0+0)	Campbell Wright; United States	22:24.5 (0+0)	Quentin Fillon Maillet; France	22:33.8 (1+0)
12.5 km pursuit	Johannes Thingnes Bø; Norway	32:26.9 (1+0+1+0)	Campbell Wright; United States	32:35.5 (1+0+0+0)	Éric Perrot; France	32:47.7 (0+1+0+0)
20 km individual	Éric Perrot; France	47:58.1 (0+1+0+0)	Tommaso Giacomel; Italy	48:50.5 (0+0+0+1)	Quentin Fillon Maillet; France	49:57.6 (2+0+1+0)
4 × 7.5 km relay	Norway; Endre Strømsheim; Tarjei Bø; Sturla Holm Lægreid; Johannes Thingnes Bø	1:18:18.1 (0+2) (0+0) (0+0) (0+2) (0+0) (0+0) (0+0) (0+0)	France; Émilien Claude; Fabien Claude; Éric Perrot; Quentin Fillon Maillet	1:19:00.0 (0+0) (0+1) (0+1) (0+2) (0+1) (0+0) (0+1) (0+1)	Germany; Philipp Nawrath; Danilo Riethmüller; Johannes Kühn; Philipp Horn	1:19:54.0 (0+1) (0+3) (0+1) (0+2) (0+0) (0+0) (0+3) (0+0)
15 km mass start	Endre Strømsheim; Norway	38:22.6 (1+0+0+0)	Sturla Holm Lægreid; Norway	38:35.0 (2+0+0+0)	Johannes Thingnes Bø; Norway	38:35.3 (1+1+2+0)

=== Women ===
Event	Gold		Silver		Bronze	
7.5 km sprint	Justine Braisaz-Bouchet; France	22:08.7 (1+0)	Franziska Preuß; Germany	22:18.5 (0+1)	Suvi Minkkinen; Finland	22:18.7 (0+0)
10 km pursuit	Franziska Preuß; Germany	26:58.9 (0+0+0+0)	Elvira Öberg; Sweden	27:38.0 (0+0+0+1)	Justine Braisaz-Bouchet; France	27:39.8 (1+0+1+1)
15 km individual	Julia Simon; France	41:27.7 (0+0+0+1)	Ella Halvarsson; Sweden	42:05.5 (0+0+0+0)	Lou Jeanmonnot; France	42:06.9 (1+0+0+0)
4 × 6 km relay	France; Lou Jeanmonnot; Océane Michelon; Justine Braisaz-Bouchet; Julia Simon	1:07:26.5 (0+0) (0+0) (0+0) (0+1) (0+2) (0+1) (0+0) (0+0)	Norway; Karoline Offigstad Knotten; Ingrid Landmark Tandrevold; Ragnhild Femsteinevik; Maren Kirkeeide	1:08:30.7 (0+0) (0+0) (0+2) (1+3) (0+0) (0+2) (0+0) (0+1)	Sweden; Anna Magnusson; Ella Halvarsson; Hanna Öberg; Elvira Öberg	1:09:11.0 (0+1) (0+0) (0+1) (0+2) (0+0) (0+0) (1+3) (0+1)
12.5 km mass start	Elvira Öberg; Sweden	40:32.3 (1+1+0+0)	Océane Michelon; France	40:41.7 (1+1+1+0)	Maren Kirkeeide; Norway	40:48.8 (2+0+1+0)

=== Mixed ===
Event	Gold		Silver		Bronze	
4 × 6 km W+M relay	France; Julia Simon; Lou Jeanmonnot; Éric Perrot; Émilien Jacquelin	1:04:41.5 (0+1) (0+0) (0+0) (0+1) (0+0) (0+0) (0+1) (1+3)	Czech Republic; Jessica Jislová; Tereza Voborníková; Vítězslav Hornig; Michal Krčmář	1:05:55.3 (0+0) (0+1) (0+2) (0+0) (0+0) (0+3) (0+1) (0+2)	Germany; Selina Grotian; Franziska Preuß; Philipp Nawrath; Justus Strelow	1:05:59.9 (0+2) (0+2) (0+1) (0+1) (0+2) (0+3) (0+0) (0+0)
6 km W + 7.5 km M single relay	France; Julia Simon; Quentin Fillon Maillet	35:25.1 (0+0) (0+0) (0+1) (0+2) (0+2) (0+1) (0+0) (0+1)	Norway; Ragnhild Femsteinevik; Johannes Thingnes Bø	35:30.8 (0+3) (0+2) (0+2) (0+1) (0+1) (0+2) (0+1) (0+3)	Germany; Franziska Preuß; Justus Strelow	35:33.4 (0+0) (0+2) (0+0) (0+0) (0+1) (0+0) (0+0) (0+1)
