= Biathlon World Championships 2025 – Single mixed relay =

Single mixed relay at the Biathlon World Championships 2025
- Venue: Roland Arena
- Location: Lenzerheide, Switzerland
- Dates: 20 February
- Competitors: 54 from 27 nations
- Teams: 27
- Winning time: 35:25.1

Medalists
gold medal	Julia Simon; Quentin Fillon Maillet	France
silver medal	Ragnhild Femsteinevik; Johannes Thingnes Bø	Norway
bronze medal	Franziska Preuß; Justus Strelow	Germany

The Single mixed relay competition at the Biathlon World Championships 2025 was held on 20 February 2025.

== Results ==
The race was started at 16:05.

Rank	Bib	Team	Time	Penalties (P+S)	Deficit
1st place, gold medalist(s)	1	France; Julia Simon; Quentin Fillon Maillet; Julia Simon; Quentin Fillon Maillet	35:25.1; 8:34.4; 7:47.2; 8:36.9; 10:26.6	0+3 0+4; 0+0 0+0; 0+2 0+1; 0+1 0+2; 0+0 0+1	
2nd place, silver medalist(s)	8	Norway; Ragnhild Femsteinevik; Johannes Thingnes Bø; Ragnhild Femsteinevik; Johannes Thingnes Bø	35:30.8; 9:06.1; 7:23.9; 8:44.9; 10:15.9	0+7 0+8; 0+3 0+2; 0+1 0+2; 0+2 0+1; 0+1 0+3	+5.7
3rd place, bronze medalist(s)	2	Germany; Franziska Preuß; Justus Strelow; Franziska Preuß; Justus Strelow	35:33.4; 8:56.5; 7:22.9; 8:33.2; 10:40.8	0+1 0+3; 0+0 0+2; 0+1 0+0; 0+0 0+0; 0+0 0+1	+8.3
4	6	Switzerland; Amy Baserga; Niklas Hartweg; Amy Baserga; Niklas Hartweg	35:37.8; 8:57.4; 7:13.7; 9:07.7; 10:19.0	0+5 0+5; 0+2 0+1; 0+0 0+0; 0+2 0+2; 0+1 0+2	+12.7
5	4	Sweden; Ella Halvarsson; Sebastian Samuelsson; Ella Halvarsson; Sebastian Samuelsson	35:38.6; 8:56.2; 7:40.1; 8:35.7; 10:26.6	0+2 0+5; 0+0 0+1; 0+1 0+2; 0+0 0+0; 0+1 0+2	+13.5
6	7	Slovenia; Lena Repinc; Jakov Fak; Lena Repinc; Jakov Fak	35:43.8; 8:45.7; 7:39.8; 8:49.6; 10:28.7	0+8 0+0; 0+1 0+0; 0+3 0+0; 0+2 0+0; 0+2 0+0	+18.7
7	17	Italy; Dorothea Wierer; Tommaso Giacomel; Dorothea Wierer; Tommaso Giacomel	35:57.7; 8:53.3; 7:33.5; 9:10.8; 10:20.1	0+4 0+2; 0+1 0+0; 0+1 0+0; 0+2 0+2; 0+0 0+0	+32.6
8	5	Austria; Lisa Theresa Hauser; Simon Eder; Lisa Theresa Hauser; Simon Eder	36:05.3; 8:50.1; 7:31.4; 9:03.6; 10:40.2	0+1 1+5; 0+1 0+2; 0+0 0+0; 0+0 1+3; 0+0 0+0	+40.2
9	12	Latvia; Baiba Bendika; Andrejs Rastorgujevs; Baiba Bendika; Andrejs Rastorgujevs	36:12.7; 8:44.5; 7:51.4; 8:48.1; 10:48.7	0+1 0+6; 0+1 0+0; 0+0 0+2; 0+0 0+2; 0+0 0+2	+47.6
10	3	Finland; Suvi Minkkinen; Tero Seppälä; Suvi Minkkinen; Tero Seppälä	36:21.7; 8:42.0; 8:10.4; 8:32.1; 10:57.2	0+6 0+4; 0+2 0+0; 0+3 0+1; 0+1 0+1; 0+0 0+2	+56.6
11	15	Bulgaria; Valentina Dimitrova; Blagoy Todev; Valentina Dimitrova; Blagoy Todev	36:29.1; 8:59.4; 7:39.4; 8:54.1; 10:56.2	0+3 0+4; 0+1 0+2; 0+1 0+1; 0+0 0+1; 0+1 0+0	+1:04.0
12	14	Moldova; Alina Stremous; Maksim Makarov; Alina Stremous; Maksim Makarov	36:33.8; 9:03.8; 7:48.0; 9:07.2; 10:34.8	0+4 0+4; 0+2 0+1; 0+0 0+2; 0+2 0+1; 0+0 0+0	+1:08.7
13	21	Belgium; Lotte Lie; Florent Claude; Lotte Lie; Florent Claude	36:45.1; 9:06.9; 7:37.9; 9:02.1; 10:58.2	0+1 0+6; 0+0 0+3; 0+0 0+0; 0+1 0+1; 0+0 0+2	+1:20.0
14	11	Czech Republic; Tereza Voborníková; Vítězslav Hornig; Tereza Voborníková; Vítězslav Hornig	36:53.6; 8:46.1; 8:19.9; 8:47.3; 11:00.3	1+3 0+5; 0+0 0+0; 1+3 0+1; 0+0 0+1; 0+0 0+3	+1:28.5
15	9	Estonia; Regina Ermits; Rene Zahkna; Regina Ermits; Rene Zahkna	37:06.8; 9:01.4; 7:30.1; 9:19.3; 11:16.0	1+10 0+5; 0+3 0+1; 0+1 0+1; 0+3 0+3; 1+3 0+0	+1:41.7
16	13	United States; Deedra Irwin; Campbell Wright; Deedra Irwin; Campbell Wright	37:07.5; 9:25.2; 7:30.6; 9:26.5; 10:45.2	0+3 0+6; 0+0 2+3; 0+1 0+0; 0+1 1+3; 0+1 0+0	+1:42.4
17	16	Poland; Joanna Jakieła; Marcin Zawół; Joanna Jakieła; Marcin Zawół	37:17.6; 8:58.5; 7:51.2; 8:48.1; 11:39.8	0+0 0+4; 0+0 0+2; 0+0 0+0; 0+0 0+1; 0+0 0+1	+1:52.5
18	22	Canada; Emma Lunder; Adam Runnalls; Emma Lunder; Adam Runnalls	37:24.0; 9:05.4; 7:56.8; 9:17.7; 11:04.1	0+4 0+4; 0+1 0+1; 0+2 0+2; 0+0 0+1; 0+1 0+0	+1:58.9
19	18	Romania; Anastasia Tolmacheva; George Colțea; Anastasia Tolmacheva; George Colțea	37:25.5; 8:52.7; 8:07.3; 8:52.0; 11:33.5	0+2 1+5; 0+1 0+0; 0+1 0+2; 0+0 0+0; 0+0 1+3	+2:00.4
20	10	Ukraine; Yuliia Dzhima; Anton Dudchenko; Yuliia Dzhima; Anton Dudchenko	37:55.6; 9:19.4; 7:54.2; 9:20.0; 11:22.0	0+0 0+4; 0+0 0+1; 0+0 0+1; 0+0 0+2; 0+0 0+0	+2:30.5
21	20	Slovakia; Mária Remeňová; Jakub Borguľa; Mária Remeňová; Jakub Borguľa	38:36.0; 8:59.7; 8:24.2; 9:43.0; 11:29.1	1+7 0+9; 0+0 0+1; 1+3 0+2; 0+2 0+3; 0+2 0+3	+3:10.9
22	19	Lithuania; Lidia Žurauskaitė; Nikita Čigak; Lidia Žurauskaitė; Nikita Čigak	38:37.8; 9:48.5; 7:44.5; 9:33.2; 11:31.6	0+5 0+6; 0+3 0+2; 0+0 0+0; 0+0 0+2; 0+2 0+2	+3:12.7
23	27	Greenland; Ukaleq Astri Slettemark; Sondre Slettemark; Ukaleq Astri Slettemark; Sondre Slettemark	39:02.3; 9:25.6; 8:17.6; 9:28.5; 11:50.6	1+7 0+1; 0+1 0+0; 0+2 0+1; 0+1 0+0; 1+3 0+0	+3:37.2
24	23	Kazakhstan; Arina Kryukova; Vadim Kurales; Arina Kryukova; Vadim Kurales	LAP; 9:47.4; 7:50.0; 10:11.8	0+4 0+2; 0+1 0+1; 0+0 0+1; 0+3 0+0	
25	24	Croatia; Anika Kožica; Krešimir Crnković; Anika Kožica; Krešimir Crnković	LAP; 9:48.6; 8:54.0	0+3 0+7; 0+1 0+1; 0+2 0+3; 0+0 0+3	
26	26	Great Britain; Shawna Pendry; Marcus Bolin Webb; Shawna Pendry; Marcus Bolin Webb	LAP; 10:06.3; 8:58.3	0+5 0+6; 0+2 0+2; 0+2 0+3; 0+1 0+1	
27	25	Australia; Darcie Morton; Phoenix Sparke; Darcie Morton; Phoenix Sparke	LAP; 10:07.8; 9:59.0	3+4 4+6; 0+1 2+3; 3+3 2+3	
