= Biathlon World Championships 2025 – Men's pursuit =

Men's pursuit at the Biathlon World Championships 2025
- Venue: Roland Arena
- Location: Lenzerheide, Switzerland
- Dates: 16 February
- Competitors: 60 from 21 nations
- Winning time: 32:26.9

Medalists
gold medal	Johannes Thingnes Bø	Norway
silver medal	Campbell Wright	United States
bronze medal	Éric Perrot	France

The Men's pursuit competition at the Biathlon World Championships 2025 was held on 16 February 2025.

== Results ==
The race was started at 15:05.

Rank	Bib	Name	Nationality	Start	Penalties (P+P+S+S)	Time	Deficit
1st place, gold medalist(s)	1	Johannes Thingnes Bø	Norway	0:00	2 (1+0+1+0)	32:26.9	
2nd place, silver medalist(s)	2	Campbell Wright	United States	0:28	1 (1+0+0+0)	32:35.5	+8.6
3rd place, bronze medalist(s)	15	Éric Perrot	France	1:11	1 (0+1+0+0)	32:47.7	+20.8
4	9	Sturla Holm Lægreid	Norway	0:57	0 (0+0+0+0)	33:03.6	+36.7
5	5	Tommaso Giacomel	Italy	0:48	2 (0+0+2+0)	33:20.9	+54.0
6	3	Quentin Fillon Maillet	France	0:37	5 (1+2+0+2)	33:43.5	+1:16.6
6	11	Jakov Fak	Slovenia	1:05	1 (0+0+1+0)	33:43.5	+1:16.6
8	7	Endre Strømsheim	Norway	0:57	3 (1+0+2+0)	33:49.5	+1:22.6
9	27	Martin Ponsiluoma	Sweden	1:49	3 (1+0+1+1)	34:02.9	+1:36.0
10	10	Tarjei Bø	Norway	1:02	2 (0+0+1+1)	34:13.8	+1:46.9
11	14	Jesper Nelin	Sweden	1:11	3 (0+0+1+2)	34:36.37	+2:09.4
12	6	Martin Uldal	Norway	0:55	4 (1+2+0+1)	34:41.0	+2:14.1
13	24	Sebastian Samuelsson	Sweden	1:35	3 (1+0+1+1)	34:45.1	+2:18.2
14	17	Florent Claude	Belgium	1:23	2 (0+0+1+1)	34:46.7	+2:19.8
15	20	Émilien Jacquelin	France	1:28	5 (1+1+3+0)	34:52.1	+2:25.2
16	8	Fabien Claude	France	0:57	6 (1+0+2+3)	34:54.7	+2:27.8
17	44	Philipp Horn	Germany	2:17	1 (0+1+0+0)	34:55.7	+2:28.8
18	19	Niklas Hartweg	Switzerland	1:28	4 (1+1+2+0)	34:56.3	+2:29.4
19	36	Vitalii Mandzyn	Ukraine	2:00	1 (0+0+0+1)	34:56.6	+2:29.7
20	16	Lukas Hofer	Italy	1:20	3 (1+0+2+0)	34:57.5	+2:30.6
21	12	Maxime Germain	United States	1:06	5 (0+1+1+2)	35:03.1	+2:36.1
22	29	Vítězslav Hornig	Czech Republic	1:52	2 (1+1+0+0)	35:11.9	+2:45.0
23	23	Michal Krčmář	Czech Republic	1:34	3 (0+1+1+1)	35:50.3	+3:03.4
24	22	Tero Seppälä	Finland	1:31	4 (1+0+1+2)	35:31.6	+3:04.7
25	4	Vebjørn Sørum	Norway	0:45	6 (1+2+2+1)	35:44.9	+3:18.0
26	33	Andrejs Rastorgujevs	Latvia	1:57	2 (1+0+1+0)	35:46.1	+3:19.2
27	13	Sebastian Stalder	Switzerland	1:06	4 (0+1+2+1)	35:46.5	+3:19.6
28	21	Joscha Burkhalter	Switzerland	1:29	3 (1+0+1+1)	35:59.7	+3:32.8
29	38	Jonáš Mareček	Czech Republic	2:09	0 (0+0+0+0)	36:09.5	+3:42.6
30	37	Dmytro Pidruchnyi	Ukraine	2:05	3 (0+0+1+2)	36:22.4	+3:55.5
31	30	Justus Strelow	Germany	1:53	3 (0+1+1+1)	36:24.8	+3:57.9
32	26	Simon Eder	Austria	1:49	2 (0+0+2+0)	36:30.5	+4:03.6
33	53	Patrick Jakob	Austria	2:33	1 (1+0+0+0)	36:50.7	+4:23.8
34	28	Vytautas Strolia	Lithuania	1:50	4 (0+1+1+2)	36:53.4	+4:26.5
35	39	Kristo Siimer	Estonia	2:10	2 (1+0+0+1)	36:53.7	+4:26.8
36	48	Pavel Magazeev	Moldova	2:33	2 (0+1+1+0)	36:56.4	+4:29.5
37	48	Konrad Badacz	Poland	2:30	2 (0+2+0+0)	36:57.1	+4:30.2
38	31	Olli Hiidensalo	Finland	1:57	4 (2+0+1+1)	37:05.1	+4:38.1
39	56	Paul Schommer	United States	2:40	4 (2+0+1+1)	37:09.9	+4:43.0
40	51	Fredrik Mühlbacher	Austria	2:31	3 (2+1+0+0)	37:12.9	+4:46.0
41	32	Blagoy Todev	Bulgaria	1:57	4 (1+2+1+0)	37:17.2	+4:50.3
42	54	Anton Vidmar	Slovenia	2:34	4 (0+2+2+0)	37:18.3	+4:51.4
43	47	Adam Runnalls	Canada	2:27	3 (0+2+0+1)	37:18.9	+4:52.0
44	18	Philipp Nawrath	Germany	1:26	7 (1+2+1+3)	37:21.7	+4:54.8
45	41	Sean Doherty	United States	2:11	6 (3+1+1+1)	37:21.7	+4:54.8
46	42	Thierry Langer	Belgium	2:11	4 (2+1+0+1)	37:23.9	+4:57.0
47	35	Anton Dudchenko	Ukraine	1:59	5 (1+1+2+1)	37:30.2	+5:03.3
48	50	Lovro Planko	Slovenia	2:31	7 (0+3+1+3)	37:37.2	+5:10.3
49	43	Didier Bionaz	Italy	2:16	7 (3+2+1+1)	37:45.1	+5:18.2
50	40	Danilo Riethmüller	Germany	2:10	8 (3+1+2+2)	37:47.1	+5:20.2
51	60	Viktor Brandt	Sweden	2:56	4 (2+1+1+0)	37:55.7	+5:28.8
52	34	Renārs Birkentāls	Latvia	1:58	6 (2+0+2+2)	38:07.7	+5:40.8
53	55	Jan Guńka	Poland	2:37	3 (0+2+0+1)	38:12.6	+5:45.7
54	25	Vladimir Iliev	Bulgaria	1:48	8 (2+3+1+2)	38:24.5	+5:57.6
55	57	Daniele Cappellari	Italy	2:42	4 (2+1+1+0)	39:00.1	+6:33.2
56	46	Arttu Heikkinen	Finland	2:26	8 (1+1+4+2)	39:28.6	+7:01.7
57	49	David Komatz	Austria	2:31	8 (0+1+4+3)	39:44.7	+7:17.8
–	45	Matija Legović	Croatia	2:18	(2+2+3+)	Lapped	
–	58	Jakob Kulbin	Estonia	2:44	(3+2+2+)	Did not finish	
–	59	Jeremy Finello	Switzerland	2:51	(4+)	Did not finish	
