= Biathlon World Championships 2025 – Men's sprint =

Men's sprint at the Biathlon World Championships 2025
- Venue: Roland Arena
- Location: Lenzerheide, Switzerland
- Dates: 15 February
- Competitors: 98 from 30 nations
- Winning time: 21:56.8

Medalists
gold medal	Johannes Thingnes Bø	Norway
silver medal	Campbell Wright	United States
bronze medal	Quentin Fillon Maillet	France

The Men's sprint competition at the Biathlon World Championships 2025 was held on 15 February 2025.

== Results ==
The race was started at 15:05.

Rank	Bib	Name	Nationality	Penalties (P+S)	Time	Deficit
1st place, gold medalist(s)	48	Johannes Thingnes Bø	Norway	0 (0+0)	21:56.8	
2nd place, silver medalist(s)	34	Campbell Wright	United States	0 (0+0)	22:24.5	+27.7
3rd place, bronze medalist(s)	38	Quentin Fillon Maillet	France	1 (1+0)	22:33.8	+37.0
4	66	Vebjørn Sørum	Norway	2 (1+1)	22:42.0	+45.2
5	54	Tommaso Giacomel	Italy	2 (0+2)	22:44.9	+48.1
6	62	Martin Uldal	Norway	1 (0+1)	22:51.5	+54.7
7	56	Endre Strømsheim	Norway	2 (1+1)	22:53.5	+56.7
8	52	Fabien Claude	France	1 (0+1)	22:53.8	+57.0
9	40	Sturla Holm Lægreid	Norway	1 (0+1)	22:54.1	+57.3
10	60	Tarjei Bø	Norway	1 (1+0)	22:58.8	+1:02.0
11	58	Jakov Fak	Slovenia	0 (0+0)	23:01.7	+1:04.9
12	37	Maxime Germain	United States	0 (0+0)	23:02.5	+1:05.7
13	14	Sebastian Stalder	Switzerland	0 (0+0)	23:03.0	+1:06.2
14	15	Jesper Nelin	Sweden	1 (0+1)	23:07.8	+1:11.0
14	64	Éric Perrot	France	2 (1+1)	23:07.8	+1:11.0
16	24	Lukas Hofer	Italy	1 (1+0)	23:16.7	+1:19.9
17	5	Florent Claude	Belgium	0 (0+0)	23:19.6	+1:22.8
18	44	Philipp Nawrath	Germany	2 (0+2)	23:22.8	+1:26.0
19	36	Niklas Hartweg	Switzerland	2 (0+2)	23:24.3	+1:27.5
19	50	Émilien Jacquelin	France	3 (1+2)	23:24.3	+1:27.5
21	27	Joscha Burkhalter	Switzerland	1 (0+1)	23:26.2	+1:29.4
22	67	Tero Seppälä	Finland	1 (0+1)	23:27.7	+1:30.9
23	43	Michal Krčmář	Czech Republic	1 (1+0)	23:30.9	+1:34.1
24	46	Sebastian Samuelsson	Sweden	2 (0+2)	23:31.4	+1:34.6
25	23	Vladimir Iliev	Bulgaria	0 (0+0)	23:44.6	+1:47.8
26	53	Simon Eder	Austria	1 (0+1)	23:45.9	+1:49.1
27	32	Martin Ponsiluoma	Sweden	5 (3+2)	23:46.1	+1:49.3
28	1	Vytautas Strolia	Lithuania	0 (0+0)	23:46.7	+1:49.9
29	20	Vítězslav Hornig	Czech Republic	1 (1+0)	23:48.3	+1:51.5
30	30	Justus Strelow	Germany	1 (0+1)	23:50.2	+1:53.4
31	72	Olli Hiidensalo	Finland	1 (1+0)	23:53.4	+1:56.6
32	39	Blagoy Todev	Bulgaria	0 (0+0)	23:53.6	+1:56.8
33	18	Andrejs Rastorgujevs	Latvia	1 (1+0)	23:54.0	+1:57.2
34	6	Renārs Birkentāls	Latvia	1 (0+1)	23:55.2	+1:58.4
35	10	Anton Dudchenko	Ukraine	0 (0+0)	23:55.9	+1:59.1
36	26	Vitalii Mandzyn	Ukraine	1 (1+0)	23:56.3	+1:59.5
37	42	Dmytro Pidruchnyi	Ukraine	2 (1+1)	24:02.0	+2:05.0
38	73	Jonáš Mareček	Czech Republic	1 (1+0)	24:05.3	+2:08.5
39	25	Kristo Siimer	Estonia	1 (0+1)	24:06.6	+2:09.8
40	28	Danilo Riethmüller	Germany	3 (3+0)	24:07.1	+2:10.3
41	68	Sean Doherty	United States	1 (1+0)	24:07.9	+2:11.1
42	16	Thierry Langer	Belgium	1 (0+1)	24:08.2	+2:11.4
43	12	Didier Bionaz	Italy	2 (0+2)	24:13.2	+2:16.4
44	22	Philipp Horn	Germany	4 (3+1)	24:14.0	+2:17.2
45	82	Matija Legović	Croatia	2 (1+1)	24:14.7	+2:17.9
46	41	Arttu Heikkinen	Finland	0 (0+0)	24:23.0	+2:26.2
47	9	Adam Runnalls	Canada	1 (1+0)	24:24.0	+2:27.2
48	47	Konrad Badacz	Poland	2 (1+1)	24:27.2	+2:30.4
49	21	David Komatz	Austria	3 (2+1)	24:47.4	+2:30.6
49	55	Lovro Planko	Slovenia	3 (2+1)	24:27.4	+2:30.6
51	57	Fredrik Mühlbacher	Austria	0 (0+0)	24:27.5	+2:30.7
52	49	Pavel Magazeev	Moldova	2 (1+1)	24:29.4	++2:32.6
53	65	Patrick Jakob	Austria	3 (2+1)	24:29.9	+2:33.1
54	2	Anton Vidmar	Slovenia	1 (1+0)	24:30.7	+2:33.9
55	74	Jan Guńka	Poland	0 (0+0)	24:33.3	+2:36.5
56	7	Paul Schommer	United States	3 (1+2)	24:36.5	+2:39.7
57	33	Daniele Cappellari	Italy	1 (0+1)	24:39.2	+2:42.4
58	61	Jakob Kulbin	Estonia	2 (1+1)	24:40.5	+2:43.7
59	70	Jeremy Finello	Switzerland	4 (1+3)	24:47.3	+2:50.5
60	29	Viktor Brandt	Sweden	4 (2+2)	24:52.4	+2:55.6
61	63	Miha Dovžan	Slovenia	2 (1+1)	24:53.5	+2:56.7
62	95	Haldan Borglum	Canada	1 (1+0)	24:55.9	+2:59.1
63	11	Maksim Makarov	Moldova	3 (3+0)	24:58.0	+3:01.2
64	4	Vladislav Kireyev	Kazakhstan	2 (0+2)	24:58.9	+3:02.1
65	35	Taras Lesiuk	Ukraine	2 (1+1)	24:59.1	+3:02.3
66	8	George Colțea	Romania	2 (1+1)	25:02.1	+3:21.9
67	97	Edgars Mise	Latvia	0 (0+0)	25:02.8	+4:42.5
68	81	Nikita Akimov	Kazakhstan	1 (1+0)	25:05.4	+3:08.6
69	45	Rene Zahkna	Estonia	0 (0+0)	25:10.2	+2:52.8
70	51	Maksim Fomin	Lithuania	3 (1+2)	25:12.8	+4:48.1
71	78	Vadim Kurales	Kazakhstan	2 (1+1)	25:13.9	+3:17.1
72	31	George Buta	Romania	2 (2+0)	25:18.5	+3:21.7
73	59	Mihail Usov	Moldova	2 (2+0)	25:27.5	+5:20.5
74	19	Adam Václavík	Czech Republic	6 (1+5)	25:28.3	+3:31.5
75	17	Krešimir Crnković	Croatia	3 (1+2)	25:31.6	+4:56.8
76	77	Marcus Webb	Great Britain	1 (0+1)	25:46.7	+6:19.7
77	88	Aleksandrs Patrijuks	Lithuania	3 (2+1)	25:47.7	+3:50.9
78	76	Phoenix Sparke	Australia	2 (1+1)	25:49.7	+3:52.9
79	92	Damián Cesnek	Slovakia	3 (0+3)	25:50.7	+5:48.3
80	69	Cornel Puchianu	Romania	4 (1+3)	25:53.2	+5:19.2
81	98	Marek Mackels	Belgium	3 (0+3)	25:55.1	+4:55.6
82	71	Anton Sinapov	Bulgaria	3 (0+3)	25:56.7	+4:42.0
83	96	Joachim Weel Rosbo	Denmark	2 (2+0)	25:57.4	+4:00.6
84	13	Jaakko Ranta	Finland	2 (1+1)	26:05.5	+4:08.7
85	87	Artur Iskhakov	Slovakia	2 (2+0)	26:05.6	+4:08.8
86	89	Raul Flore	Romania	2 (1+1)	26:06.8	+4:10.0
87	91	Marcin Zawół	Poland	1 (0+1)	26:12.1	+4:15.3
88	79	Apostolos Angelis	Greece	2 (0+2)	26:20.1	+4:23.3
89	94	Logan Pletz	Canada	4 (3+1)	26:22.8	+4:26.0
90	93	Jokūbas Mackinė	Lithuania	4 (3+1)	26:24.6	+4:27.8
91	3	Tomáš Sklenárik	Slovakia	4 (2+2)	26:55.6	+4:58.8
92	84	Ivan Darin	Kazakhstan	5 (2+3)	27:02.8	+5:06.0
93	99	Roberto Piqueras	Spain	1 (1+0)	27:22.3	+5:51.6
94	83	Jacob Weel Rosbo	Denmark	2 (2+0)	25:57.4	+6:31.2
95	75	Javier Giménez	Argentina	2 (1+1)	27:45.4	+5:48.6
96	85	Noah Bradford	Australia	3 (2+1)	27:45.9	+5:49.1
97	90	Athanasios Gastis	Greece	3 (2+1)	28:03.2	+6:06.4
98	86	Sean Benson	Australia	2 (0+2)	28:52.5	+6:55.7
—	80	Enkhsaikhan Enkhbat	Mongolia	Did not start		
