= Anton Ivarsson =

Swedish biathlete (born 2001)

Personal information
- Nationality: Swedish
- Born: 27 January 2001 (age 25) Östersund, Sweden

Sport
- Country: Sweden
- Sport: Biathlon
Medal record
Representing Sweden
Men's biathlon
European Championships
Gold medal – first place	2024 Osrblie	Single mixed relay
Bronze medal – third place	2023 Lenzerheide	Mixed relay

Anton Ivarsson (born 27 January 2001) is a Swedish former biathlete. He had competed in the Biathlon World Cup from 2023 to 2024.

== Career ==
Anton Ivarsson made his first international appearances at the Olympic Youth Festival in February 2019 but missed out on finishing in the top 20 in the individual races. The following year, he competed in the Youth World Championships for the first time, finishing 18th in the individual event and 8th with the junior relay team. Ivarsson's first experiences at the senior level came during the 2021 European Championships in Duszniki-Zdrój, Poland. Despite hitting 19 out of 20 targets in the individual race, he placed only 46th. At the Junior World Championships, he once again achieved a top-10 result with the relay team, but his initial IBU Cup races ended outside the pursuit qualification range. He scored his first IBU Cup points in January 2022 in Osrblie, finishing 32nd in the short individual event. At the 2022 Junior World Championships, he secured 7th place in the individual race thanks to flawless shooting.

For the 2022/23 season, Ivarsson was included in the Swedish B team (Team Autoexperten) and showed remarkable progress, particularly in his skiing performance. He earned points in every competition except for one sprint, achieving a total of eight top-20 finishes. In Osrblie, he achieved his first IBU Cup podium in a mixed relay alongside Oskar Brandt, Sara Andersson, and Felicia Lindqvist. In early February, he claimed his first individual podium, finishing 3rd in the sprint in Obertilliach behind Vebjørn Sørum and Endre Strømsheim, despite one shooting miss. Ivarsson's strongest performances came at the 2023 European Championships in Lenzerheide, where he placed 12th in the sprint and 10th in the pursuit. He also won a bronze medal in the mixed relay with Tilda Johansson, Stina Nilsson, and Malte Stefansson. As the anchor leg, he secured the result with the fastest course time of all athletes.

In November 2023, Ivarsson surprised many by winning the Swedish championship title in the shortened individual event in Idre, beating Sebastian Samuelsson. Shortly afterward, he made his World Cup debut in Östersund, though his initial performances were underwhelming. Returning to the IBU Cup in early January 2024, he achieved two 8th-place finishes and 11th in the individual race at the European Championships later that season. Also at the European Championships, Ivarsson achieved a victory in the single mixed relay with Sara Andersson after Norwegian Emilie Kalkenberg incurred a penalty loop during the final standing stage, allowing Andersson to cross the finish line first. In March, Ivarsson rejoined the World Cup team and narrowly missed his first World Cup points, finishing 42nd and 41st in the sprint and pursuit events in Canmore.

== Biathlon results ==
All results are sourced from the International Biathlon Union.

=== World Cup ===
Season	Overall			Individual		Sprint		Pursuit		Mass start	
Season	Races	Points	Position	Points	Position	Points	Position	Points	Position	Points	Position
2023–24	7/21	Didn't earn World Cup points									
2024–25	4/21	Didn't earn World Cup points									

=== Youth and Junior World Championships ===
Year	Age	Individual	Sprint	Pursuit	Relay	Mixed Relay
(Switzerland) 2020 Lenzerheide	18	18th	30th	22nd	8th	N/A
(Austria) 2021 Obertilliach	19	52nd	46th	35th	9th	N/A
(United States) 2022 Soldier Hollow	20	7th	31st	36th	DNF	—
(Kazakhstan) 2023 Shchuchinsk	21	—	—	—	—	5th
