= Biathlon World Championships 2025 – Men's mass start =

Men's mass start at the Biathlon World Championships 2025
- Venue: Roland Arena
- Location: Lenzerheide, Switzerland
- Dates: 23 February
- Competitors: 30
- Winning time: 38:22.6

Medalists
gold medal	Endre Strømsheim	Norway
silver medal	Sturla Holm Lægreid	Norway
bronze medal	Johannes Thingnes Bø	Norway

The Men's mass start competition at the Biathlon World Championships 2025 was held on 23 February 2025.

== Results ==
The race was started at 15:05.

Rank	Bib	Name	Nationality	Penalties (P+S)	Time	Deficit
1st place, gold medalist(s)	15	Endre Strømsheim	Norway	1 (1+0+0+0)	38:22.6	
2nd place, silver medalist(s)	6	Sturla Holm Lægreid	Norway	2 (2+0+0+0)	38:35.0	+12.4
3rd place, bronze medalist(s)	1	Johannes Thingnes Bø	Norway	4 (1+1+2+0)	38:35.3	+12.7
4	3	Campbell Wright	United States	2 (1+0+1+0)	38:54.0	+31.4
5	21	Martin Ponsiluoma	Sweden	4 (1+0+1+2)	39:04.5	+41.9
6	4	Tommaso Giacomel	Italy	4 (1+2+0+1)	39:07.2	+44.6
7	2	Eric Perrot	France	3 (1+1+1+0)	39:14.9	+52.3
8	28	Lukas Hofer	Italy	1 (0+0+0+1)	39:17.6	+55.0
9	29	Tero Seppälä	Finland	1 (0+0+0+1)	39:17.6	+55.0
10	18	Jesper Nelin	Sweden	2 (0+0+0+2)	39:39.0	+1:16.4
11	7	Émilien Jacquelin	France	3 (1+0+2+0)	39:44.5	+1:21.9
12	9	Sebastian Samuelsson	Sweden	4 (1+0+2+1)	39:45.7	+1:23.1
13	23	Philipp Horn	Germany	2 (1+0+0+1)	39:59.0	+1:36.4
14	10	Vebjørn Sørum	Norway	3 (0+1+2+0)	40:09.0	+1:46.4
15	11	Fabien Claude	France	5 (1+0+3+1)	40:10.7	+1:48.1
16	12	Philipp Nawrath	Germany	2 (0+2+0+0)	40:17.4	+1:54.8
17	17	Niklas Hartweg	Switzerland	3 (0+2+1+0)	40:25.3	+2:02.7
18	8	Tarjei Bø	Norway	5 (1+1+2+1)	40:32.9	+2:10.3
19	5	Quentin Fillon Maillet	France	6 (3+2+1+0)	40:47.3	+2:24.7
20	27	Andrejs Rastorgujevs	Latvia	1 (0+1+0+0)	40:50.8	+2:28.2
21	13	Martin Uldal	Norway	6 (2+0+3+1)	40:59.2	+2:36.6
22	24	Florent Claude	Belgium	4 (1+2+1+0)	40:59.6	+2:37.0
23	19	Michal Krčmář	Czech Republic	3 (0+2+1+0)	41:00.0	+2:37.4
24	14	Jakov Fak	Slovenia	4 (2+0+1+1)	41:01.5	+2:38.9
25	20	Sebastian Stalder	Switzerland	3 (0+2+0+1)	41:12.6	+2:50.0
26	30	Joscha Burkhalter	Switzerland	2 (1+0+0+1)	41:14.6	+2:52.0
27	25	Vitalii Mandzyn	Ukraine	3 (0+1+1+1)	41:33.5	+3:10.9
28	26	Maxime Germain	United States	4 (2+1+1+0)	41:57.4	+3:34.8
29	22	Olli Hiidensalo	Finland	4 (1+1+1+1)	42:21.2	+3:58.6
30	16	Dmytro Pidruchnyi	Ukraine	4 (0+4+0+0)	44:06.1	+5:43.5
