= 2020 IBU Junior Open European Championships =

- Host city: Hochfilzen, Austria
- Dates: 11–12 March
- Events: 8

The 5th IBU Junior Open European Championships were held from 11 to 12 March 2020 in Hochfilzen, Austria.

== Schedule ==
All times are local (UTC+1).

Date	Time	Event
11 March	10:00	Men's 15 km individual
11 March	13:30	Women's 12.5 km individual
12 March	10:00	Men's 10 km sprint
12 March	13:30	Women's 7.5 km sprint
14 March	10:00	4 × 7.5 km mixed relay
14 March	12:00	Single mixed relay
15 March	10:00	Men's 12.5 km pursuit
15 March	12:00	Women's 10 km pursuit

== Medal summary ==
=== Medal table ===
* Host nation (Austria)

Rank	Nation	Gold	Silver	Bronze	Total
1	Czech Republic	1	1	0	2
1	Slovenia	1	1	0	2
3	Austria*	1	0	0	1
3	Ukraine	1	0	0	1
5	Russia	0	1	1	2
6	France	0	1	0	1
7	Italy	0	0	1	1
7	Poland	0	0	1	1
7	Switzerland	0	0	1	1
Totals (9 entries)		4	4	4	12

=== Men ===
Event	Gold		Silver		Bronze	
15 km individual details	Vítězslav Hornig; Czech Republic	44:26.5 (0+0+0+0)	Alex Cisar; Slovenia	44:55.5 (0+0+0+0)	Patrick Braunhofer; Italy	45:40.7 (0+0+0+0)
10 km sprint details	Alex Cisar; Slovenia	26:30.0 (0+0)	Vítězslav Hornig; Czech Republic	26:51.2 (0+1)	Niklas Hartweg; Switzerland	26:53.5 (0+0)
12.5 km pursuit	Cancelled due to the coronavirus pandemic					

=== Women ===
Event	Gold		Silver		Bronze	
12.5 km individual details	Anna Gandler; Austria	44:47.4 (0+0+0+0)	Amina Ivanova; Russia	46:04.2 (0+0+0+0)	Joanna Jakieła; Poland	46:14.9 (0+1+0+2)
7.5 km sprint details	Ekaterina Bekh; Ukraine	24:50.2 (0+1)	Laura Boucaud; France	25:11.6 (0+0)	Anastasia Shevchenko; Russia	25:23.7 (0+0)
10 km pursuit	Cancelled due to the coronavirus pandemic					

=== Mixed ===
Event	Gold	Silver	Bronze
Single mixed relay	Cancelled due to the coronavirus pandemic		
Mixed relay	Cancelled due to the coronavirus pandemic		
