= 2019 IBU Junior Open European Championships =

- Host city: Sjusjøen, Norway
- Dates: 6–10 March
- Events: 8

The 4th IBU Junior Open European Championships was held from 6 to 10 March 2019 in Sjusjøen, Norway.

There was a total of 8 competitions: Single Mixed Relay, Mixed Relay, Sprint Women, Sprint Men, Pursuit Women, Pursuit Men, Individual Women and Individual Men.

== Schedule ==
All times are local (UTC+1).

Date	Time	Event
6 March	10:00	Men's 15 km Individual
6 March	13:30	Women's 12.5 km Individual
7 March	10:00	Single Mixed Relay
7 March	13:00	Mixed Relay
9 March	10:00	Men's 10 km Sprint
9 March	13:00	Women's 7.5 km Sprint
10 March	10:00	Men's 12.5 km Pursuit
10 March	13:00	Women's 10 km Pursuit

== Medal summary ==
=== Medal table ===
* Host nation (Norway)

Rank	Nation	Gold	Silver	Bronze	Total
1	Germany (GER)	3	2	4	9
2	France (FRA)	2	1	0	3
3	Russia (RUS)	2	0	1	3
4	Norway (NOR)*	1	3	0	4
5	Sweden (SWE)	0	1	1	2
6	Switzerland (SUI)	0	1	0	1
7	Italy (ITA)	0	0	1	1
7	Slovenia (SLO)	0	0	1	1
Totals (8 entries)		8	8	8	24

=== Men ===
Event	Gold		Silver		Bronze	
15 km individual details	Tim Grotian; Germany	40:33.4 (0+0+0+0)	Vebjørn Sørum; Norway	40:56.8 (0+1+0+0)	Alex Cisar; Slovenia	41:27.6 (0+0+0+0)
10 km Sprint details	Sivert Guttorm Bakken; Norway	24:48.1 (0+0)	Tim Grotian; Germany	24:55.6 (0+0)	Tommaso Giacomel; Italy	25:12.7 (0+0)
12.5 km Pursuit details	Julian Hollandt; Germany	36:23.5 (0+0+2+0)	Sivert Guttorm Bakken; Norway	36:38.3 (1+1+2+2)	Tim Grotian; Germany	36:45.6 (0+1+4+1)

=== Women ===
Event	Gold		Silver		Bronze	
12.5 km individual details	Camille Bened; France	40:09.2 (0+0+0+0)	Amanda Lundström; Sweden	40:14.7 (0+0+0+0)	Franziska Pfnür; Germany	40:38.9 (0+0+1+0)
7.5 km Sprint details	Camille Bened; France	21:58.0 (0+0)	Gilonne Guigonnat; France	22:00.4 (0+0)	Juliane Frühwirt; Germany	22:13.1 (0+1)
10 km Pursuit details	Juliane Frühwirt; Germany	32:14.8 (0+1+1+1)	Hanna Kebinger; Germany	32:25.5 (1+0+3+0)	Anastasia Kaisheva; Russia	32:36.6 (1+0+1+2)

=== Mixed ===
Event	Gold		Silver		Bronze	
Single mixed relay details	Russia; Ksenia Dovgaya; Igor Malinovskii; Ksenia Dovgaya; Igor Malinovskii	42:47.8 (0+2) (0+0) (0+1) (0+1) (0+1) (0+3) (0+1) (0+1)	Switzerland; Amy Baserga; Sebastian Stalder; Amy Baserga; Sebastian Stalder	42:54.7 (0+1) (0+0) (0+0) (0+2) (1+3) (0+2) (0+1) (0+2)	Sweden; Amanda Lundström; Henning Sjökvist; Amanda Lundström; Henning Sjökvist	43:09.8 (0+0) (0+2) (0+1) (0+1) (0+0) (0+1) (0+0) (0+2)
Mixed relay details	Russia; Anastasiia Goreeva; Alina Klevtsova; Aleksandr Bektuganov; Said Karimulla Khalili	1:18:06.8 (0+1) (0+3) (0+1) (0+1) (0+2) (0+3) (0+0) (0+1)	Norway; Hilde Fosse; Randi Sollid Nordvang; Vebjørn Sørum; Sivert Guttorm Bakken	1:18:44.0 (0+0) (0+2) (0+0) (0+2) (0+3) (0+2) (0+1) (0+2)	Germany; Hanna Kebinger; Juliane Frühwirt; Tim Grotian; Julian Hollandt	1:19:12.1 (0+1) (0+3) (0+0) (0+0) (0+2) (0+2) (0+1) (1+3)
