= Malte Stefansson =

Swedish biathlete (born 2000)

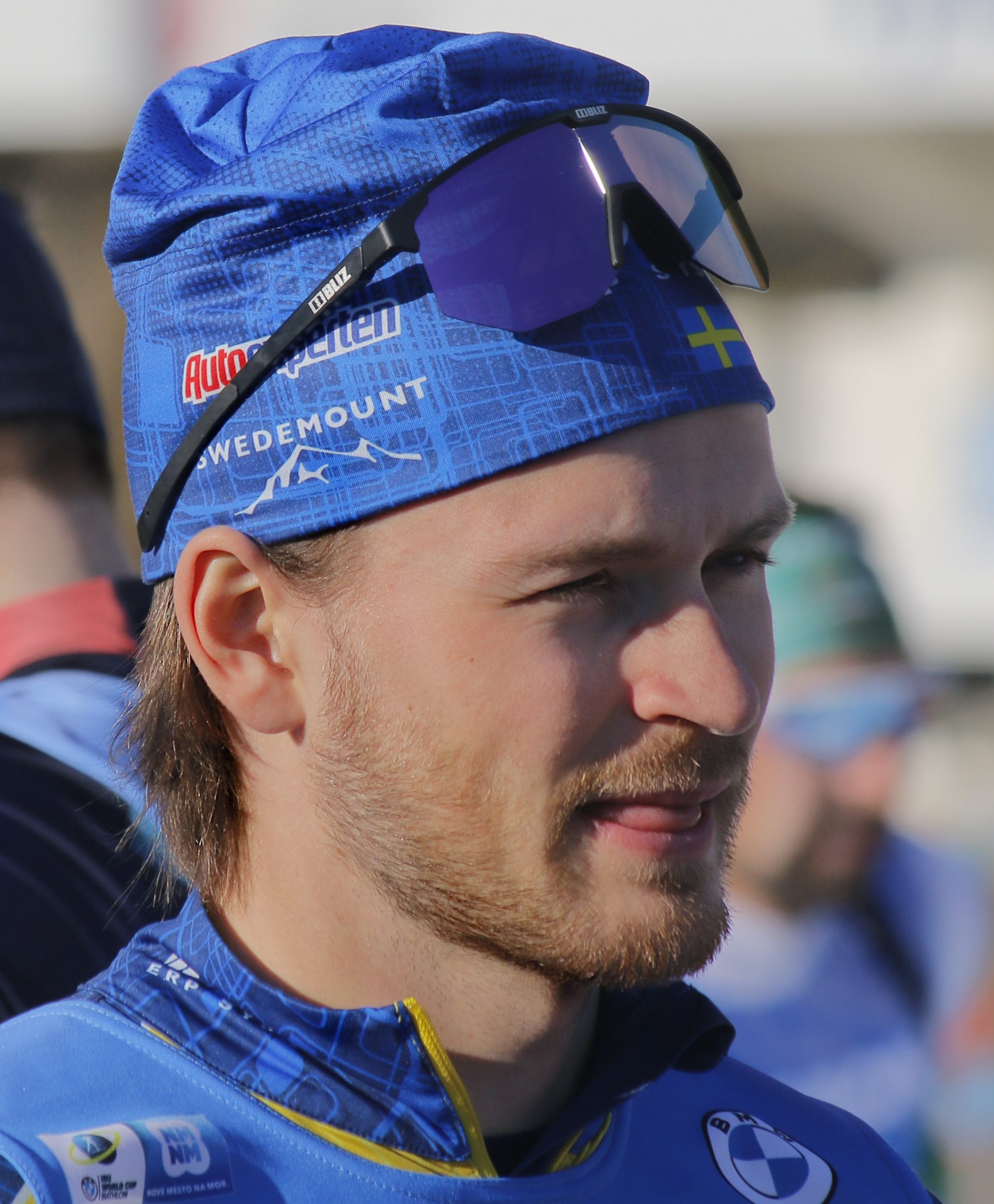
- Stefansson in 2023

Personal information
- Nationality: Swedish
- Born: 4 April 2000 (age 26) Mora, Sweden

Sport
- Country: Sweden
- Sport: Biathlon
Medal record
Representing Sweden
Men's biathlon
European Championships
Bronze medal – third place	2023 Lenzerheide	Mixed relay

Malte Stefansson (born 4 April 2000) is a Swedish biathlete. He has competed in the Biathlon World Cup since 2020.

== Career ==
Malte Stefansson has been involved in biathlon since the age of 11, but initially competed as a junior in national cross-country skiing events. His best result in this discipline came in late 2017 in Idre, where he secured a third-place finish. By 2018, he had also participated in two FIS races. Stefansson's first international biathlon championship was the 2018 Youth World Championships, where the Swedish athlete struggled to make an impression.

At the start of the 2019/20 season, Stefansson debuted in the IBU Cup and competed at that level throughout the winter. He earned his first ranking points with a 33rd-place finish in the Mass Start 60 in Ridnaun, which he improved upon with a 22nd-place finish in the same event in Martell. Despite persistent shooting misses, Stefansson made his World Cup debut the following winter at the age of 20. After finishing outside the top 70 in races at Kontiolahti and Hochfilzen, he was dropped from the Swedish World Cup team. However, he excelled in the IBU Cup at Arber, achieving his career-first clean shooting performance in a sprint race, where he finished ninth. This was followed by a 10th-place finish in the short individual event and fifth place in the mixed relay alongside Oskar Brandt, Ingela Andersson, and Anna Magnusson. Stefansson capped the season with another fifth-place finish in the single mixed relay at Obertilliach.

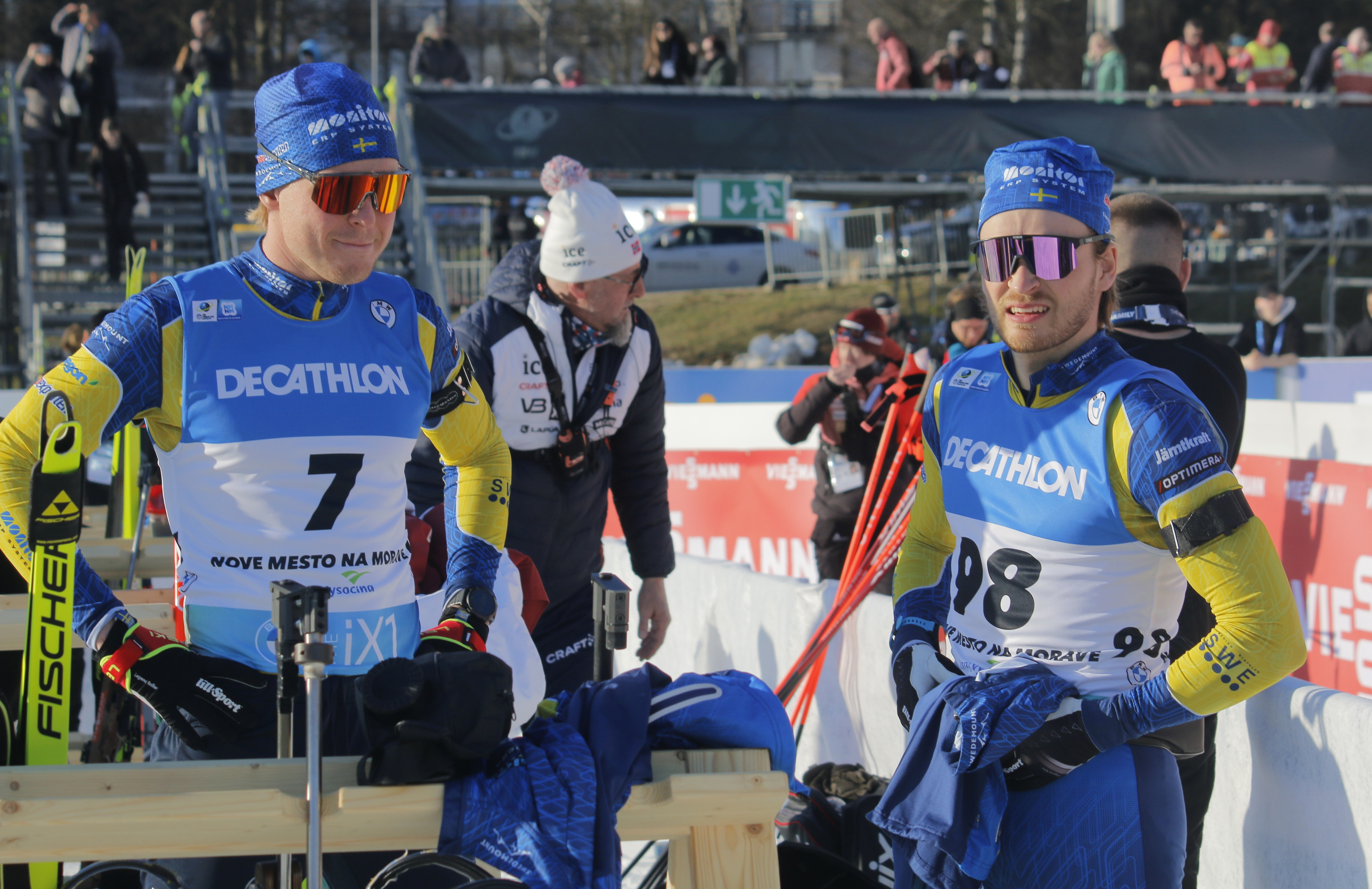
Stefansson (right) and Emil Nykvist in 2023 in Nové Město.

In the 2021/22 season, Stefansson became a full-time member of the World Cup team and significantly improved his performances. In Hochfilzen, he reached his first pursuit race and earned his first ranking point with a 40th-place finish. He also stepped in for Jesper Nelin, who was ill, to compete in his first World Cup relay, helping Sweden to a fifth-place finish after taking over the race in the lead from Martin Ponsiluoma. Thanks to his strong performances, Stefansson was named as Sweden's sixth athlete for the Beijing Olympic Games, though he did not compete. He closed the season with personal bests, finishing 34th and 38th in Oslo.

After competing in the IBU Cup during the first trimester of the 2022/23 winter season, Stefansson returned to the World Cup team for the Pokljuka events. There, he improved his career-best finish with a 33rd-place result in the pursuit. He won his first international medal at the European Championships, earning bronze in the mixed relay alongside Tilda Johansson, Stina Nilsson, and Anton Ivarsson. At his home World Cup in Östersund, Stefansson delivered a strong performance, finishing 24th in the individual event. He narrowly missed the podium in the men's relay, finishing fourth with Jesper Nelin, Martin Ponsiluoma, and Peppe Femling. He concluded the season ranked 64th in the overall World Cup standings.

The 2023/24 World Cup season started disastrously for Stefansson, leading to his removal from the national team after the New Year. For the remainder of the season, he competed in the IBU Cup, where shooting errors continued to hinder his results. Nonetheless, he achieved his season's best result at the European Championships in Osrblie, finishing eighth in the individual event.

== Personal life ==
Stefansson is originally from Oxberg in the Mora municipality, represents the local ski club, and is based at the biathlon training center in Östersund. He is in a relationship with his fellow biathlete Anna Hedström.

== Biathlon results ==
All results are sourced from the International Biathlon Union.

=== World Cup ===
Season	Overall			Individual		Sprint		Pursuit		Mass start	
Season	Races	Points	Position	Points	Position	Points	Position	Points	Position	Points	Position
2020–21	5/26	Didn't earn World Cup points									
2021–22	14/22	11	88th	—	—	7	85th	4	76th	—	—
2022–23	7/21	32	64th	17	7th	1	78th	8	68th	—	—
2023–24	4/21	Didn't earn World Cup points									
2024–25	12/21	10	77th	—	—	10	65th	—	—	—	—
2025–26	17/21	122	40th	25	43rd	32	48th	44	40th	21	33rd

==== Relay podiums ====
- 2 podiums

No.	Season	Date	Location	Level	Race	Place	Teammate(s)
1	2025–26	14 December 2025	(Austria) Hochfilzen	World Cup	Relay	3rd	Nelin, Ponsiluoma, Samuelsson
2	2025–26	11 January 2026	(Germany) Oberhof	World Cup	Relay	3rd	Nelin, Ponsiluoma, Samuelsson

=== Youth and Junior World Championships ===
Year	Age	Individual	Sprint	Pursuit	Relay
(Estonia) 2018 Otepää	18	62th	69th	—	12th
(Slovakia) 2019 Brezno-Osrblie	19	26th	47th	49th	19th
(Switzerland) 2020 Lenzerheide	20	66th	30th	22nd	8th
(Austria) 2021 Obertilliach	21	69th	17th	19th	9th
