= Uiloq Slettemark =

Greenlandic biathlete

- Born: 6 August 1965 (age 61); Varde, Denmark
- Known for: biathlete
- Spouse: Øystein Slettemark

Uiloq Slettemark (born 6 August 1965) is a retired Greenlandic biathlete.

== Personal life ==
Slettemark was born in Varde on 6 August, 1965. Her hometown is Nuuk. She is married to Øystein Slettemark, who is also a biathlete, as are their children Ukaleq (born 2001) and Sondre (born 2004). She agreed to marry her husband if he would ski across Greenland with her.

She was invited to join Sunniva Sorby's planned journey to ski across Antarctica in 2000. During the planning stages, Slettemark said that she was not afraid of the cold due to growing up in Greenland, though many of her relatives and friends had died in poor weather, but she did worry about fractures in the ice that the party might fall into. The project was ultimately cancelled due to insufficient funding.

== Athletic career ==
Between the two of them, she and her hsuband have competed about thirty times in the Arctic Circle Race, both winning a large number of medals. The race is a challenging three-day race that covers 160 kilometres (99 mi). Uiloq had won 8 times by 2007 and won an eight time in 2008. In 2012, Uiloq said that she had won 14 medals in the race and she might have obtained 15 if she had not been seven months pregnant whilst competing one year. She did not compete in 2012, as she was busy with an invitation to cross the Greenland ice cap.

She competed in a number of International Ski and Snowboard Federation competitions between 1998 and 2018, including the 1999 Nordic World Championships, the 2000 Cross-Country World Cup held in Lamoura-Mouthe, the 2001 Nordic World Championships, and the 2002 Cross-Country World Cup held in Lillehammer.

In 2007, she competed at the Biathlon World Cup held in Holmenkollen, where she placed 83rd. In 2012, she competed at the Biathlon World Championships 2012 – Women's sprint and placed 107th. Uiloq said that during her peak years, she could have participated in the 2002 Winter Olympics and the 2006 Winter Olympics, but the Danish Olympic Committee had "completely unrealistic" requirements for athletes to be sent. She attempted a comeback for the 2010 Winter Olympics, but she fell 8 seconds short of the Danish Olympic Committee's requirements. Uiloq is the founder of the Greenland Biathlon Federation.
