= Ukaleq Slettemark =

Greenlandic biathlete (born 2001)

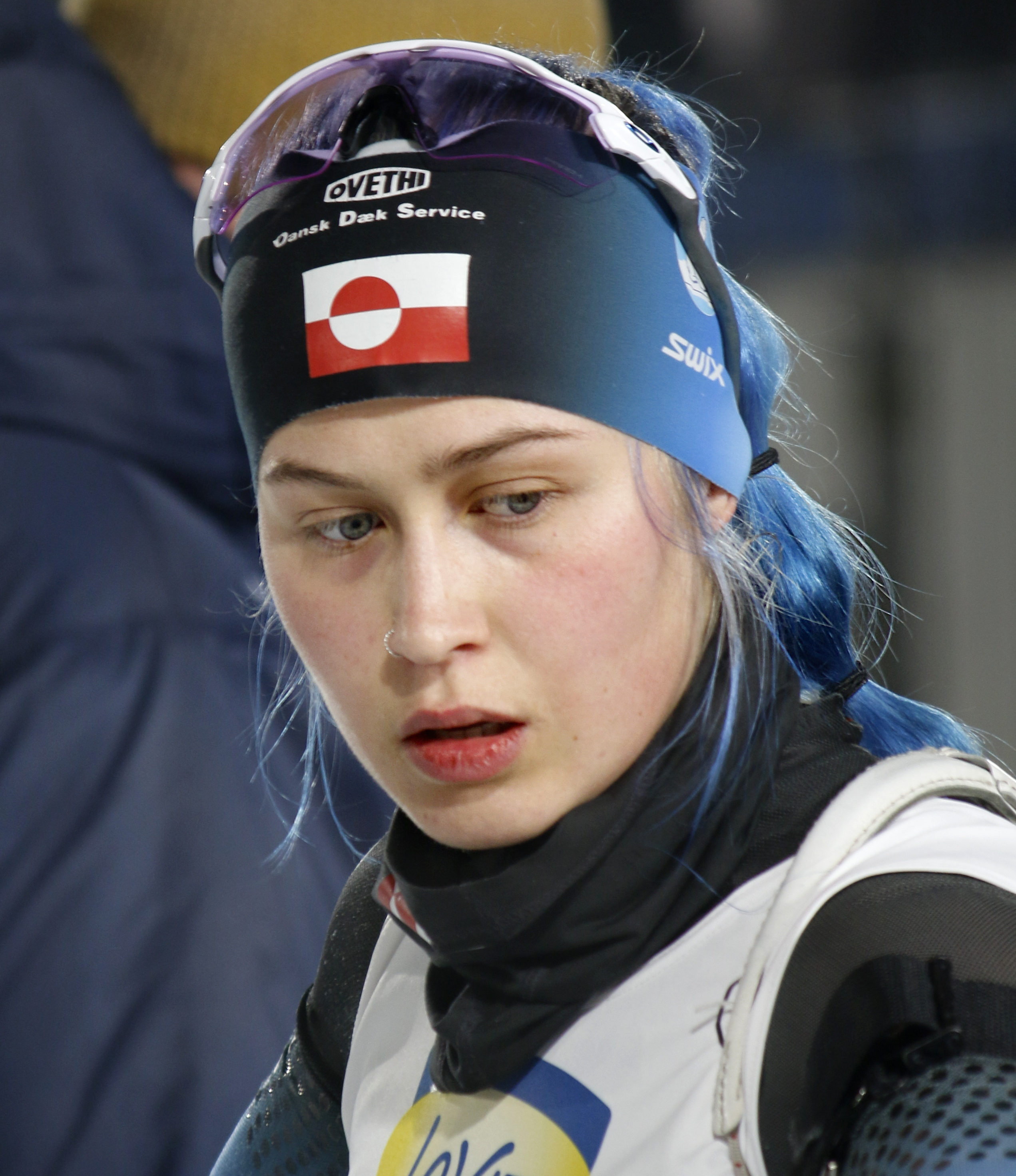
- Ukaleq Slettemark in 2024

Personal information
- Full name: Ukaleq Astri Slettemark
- Nationality: Greenlandic
- Born: 9 September 2001 (age 24) Nuuk, Greenland
- Height: 1.76 m (5 ft 9 in)
- Weight: 68 kg (150 lb)

Sport

Professional information
- Sport: Biathlon
- Club: Geilo IL
- World Cup debut: 11 December 2020

Olympic Games
- Teams: 2 (2022, 2026)

World Championships
- Teams: 1 (2021)

World Cup
- Seasons: 1 (2020-21)
- Individual races: 3
- All races: 3
Medal record
Women's biathlon
Representing Greenland
Youth World Championships
Gold medal – first place	2019 Brezno	10 km individual
- Updated on 22 February 2026

Ukaleq Astri Slettemark (born 9 September 2001) is a Greenlandic biathlete. She won gold in the 10 km Individual in the Biathlon Junior World Championships 2019, becoming Greenland's first medalist in an IBU World Championships at ny level. She competed for Denmark at the 2022 Winter Olympics and at the 2026 Winter Olympics.

== Career ==
Slettemark won a gold medal in the 10 km individual at the Biathlon Junior World Championships 2019 by 1 minute and 14 seconds over Tereza Voborníková. This was Greenland's first ever medal at any level of an IBU World Championships. Slettemark made her debut in the World Cup in Hochfilzen on 11 December 2020, finishing 96th in the sprint.

Slettemark competed at the Biathlon World Championships 2021, where she finished 65th in the individual and 77th in the sprint. She represented Denmark at the 2022 Winter Olympics, as Greenland does not have a National Olympic Committee. She became the first woman from Greenland to compete at an Olympic Games. She finished 65th in the sprint and 53rd in the individual.

At the Biathlon World Championships 2023, Slettemark finished 56th in the sprint and 88th in the individual. She competed with her brother in the single mixed relay at the Biathlon World Championships 2025, and they finished 23rd out of the 29 teams. She represented Denmark at the 2026 Winter Olympics and finished 52nd in the individual event. She also competed in the sprint and finished 86th.

== Personal life ==
Slettemark is Inuit. Her parents are also biathletes, her father Øystein competed at the 2010 Winter Olympics representing Denmark, her mother Uiloq participated at the 2012 World Championships. Her brother Sondre made his debut in the Biathlon World Championships 2025, and they both competed at the 2026 Winter Olympics.

During the 2026 Winter Olympics, Slettemark criticized Donald Trump's proposal to annex Greenland.

== Biathlon results ==
All results are sourced from the International Biathlon Union.

=== Olympic Games ===
Event	Individual	Sprint	Pursuit	Mass start	Relay	Mixed relay
(China) 2022 Beijing	53rd	65th	—	—	—	—
(Italy) 2026 Milan-Cortina	52nd	86th	—	—	—	—

=== World Championships ===
Event	Individual	Sprint	Pursuit	Mass start	Relay	Mixed relay	Single mixed relay
(Slovenia) 2021 Pokljuka	65th	77th	—	—	—	—	—
(Germany) 2023 Oberhof	88th	56th	DNS	—	—	—	—
(Czech Republic) 2024 Nové Město	65th	77th	—	—	—	—	—
(Switzerland) 2025 Lenzerheide	88th	72nd	—	—	—	—	23rd

=== Other competition ===
==== European Championships ====
Event	Level	Individual	Sprint	Pursuit	Mixed relay	Single mixed relay
(Norway) 2019 Sjusjøen	Junior	12th	12th	19th	—	—

==== Junior/Youth World Championships ====
Event	Level	Individual	Sprint	Pursuit	Relay
(Estonia) 2018 Otepää	Youth	27th	10th	4th	—
(Slovakia) 2019 Brezno	Youth	1st	6th	4th	—
(Switzerland) 2020 Lenzerheide	Youth	DNS	—	—	—
(Austria) 2021 Obertilliach	Junior	8th	DNS	—	—

== See also ==
- List of professional sports families
