= 2016 IBU Junior Open European Championships =

The 1st Junior Open European Championships was held from 17 to 20 March 2016 in Pokljuka, Slovenia. There were a total of 6 competitions: sprint, pursuit and individual races for men and women. The championships were part of the IBU Junior Cup and were held separately from the European Championships for the first time.

== Schedule ==
All times are local (UTC+1).

Date	Time	Event
17 March	10:00	Men's 15 km Individual
17 March	14:30	Women's 12.5 km Individual
19 March	10:00	Men's 10 km Sprint
19 March	13:30	Women's 7.5 km Sprint
20 March	10:00	Men's 12.5 km Pursuit
20 March	13:30	Women's 10 km Pursuit

== Medal summary ==
=== Medal table ===
Rank	Nation	Gold	Silver	Bronze	Total
1	France (FRA)	2	3	1	6
2	Belarus (BLR)	2	0	0	2
3	Germany (GER)	1	2	3	6
4	Ukraine (UKR)	1	1	1	3
5	Kazakhstan (KAZ)	0	0	1	1
Totals (5 entries)		6	6	6	18

=== Men ===
Event	Gold		Silver		Bronze	
15 km Individual	Viktar Kryuko; Belarus	38:05.3 (0+0+1+0)	Anton Dudchenko; Ukraine	39:20.3 (0+0+1+0)	Roman Yeremin; Kazakhstan	38:45.9 (1+0+1+0)
10 km Sprint	Viktar Kryuko; Belarus	25:08.0 (1+1)	Dominic Reiter; Germany	25:10.6 (0+0)	David Zobel; Germany	25:20.3 (0+2)
12.5 km Pursuit	David Zobel; Germany	32:56.7 (1+0+1+0)	Émilien Jacquelin; France	33:23.9 (1+0+0+2)	Anton Dudchenko; Ukraine	33:38.1 (0+1+2+0)

=== Women ===
Event	Gold		Silver		Bronze	
12.5 km Individual	Anastasiya Merkushyna; Ukraine	39:53.3 (0+0+0+0)	Christin Maier; Germany	40:28.4 (0+0+0+0)	Lena Arnaud; France	40:42.2 (0+0+1+0)
7.5 km Sprint	Lena Arnaud; France	23:02.2 (0+0)	Chloé Chevalier; France	23:25.6 (2+0)	Christin Maier; Germany	23:31.4 (0+0)
10 km Pursuit	Julia Simon; France	36:28.5 (1+0+0+1)	Lena Arnaud; France	36:50.2 (2+0+0+1)	Christin Maier; Germany	37:47.9 (0+1+1+0)
