= Øystein Slettemark =

Greenlandic biathlete (born 1967)

Personal information
- Born: 20 August 1967 (age 58) Rio de Janeiro, Brazil

Sport
- Sport: Skiing
- Updated on 28 February 2013

Øystein Slettemark (born 20 August 1967) is a Greenlandic biathlete.

== Career ==
Slettemark competed in the 2010 Winter Olympics for Denmark. His best performance was 86th in the sprint. He also finished 88th in the individual.

At IBU events, Slettemark represents Greenland, which does not have its own National Olympic Committee. He is married to Uiloq Slettemark who is also a biathlete as are their children Ukaleq (born 2001) and Sondre (born 2004). Between the two of them they have competed about thirty times in the Arctic Circle Race winning a large number of medals. Uiloq said that she had 14 medals and she might have obtained 15 if she had not been seven months pregnant whilst competing.

As of February 2013, his best performance at the Biathlon World Championships is 77th, in the 2007 sprint.

As of February 2013, his best Biathlon World Cup finish is 49th, in the individual at Fort Kent in 2003/04.
