= 2017 IBU Junior Open European Championships =

The 2nd Junior Open European Championships is being held from 1 to 5 February 2017 in Nove Mesto, Czech Republic.There are a total of 6 competitions: sprint, pursuit and individual races for men and women.

== Schedule ==
All times are local (UTC+1).

Date	Time	Event
2 February	10:00	Women's 12.5 km Individual
2 February	13:30	Men's 15 km Individual
4 February	10:00	Women's 7.5 km Sprint
4 February	13:00	Men's 10 km Sprint
5 February	10:00	Women's 10 km Pursuit
5 February	13:00	Men's 12.5 km Pursuit

== Medal summary ==
=== Medal table ===
Rank	Nation	Gold	Silver	Bronze	Total
1	Czech Republic (CZE)	3	1	1	5
2	Russia (RUS)	2	2	1	5
3	Germany (GER)	1	0	0	1
4	Austria (AUT)	0	1	0	1
4	Canada (CAN)	0	1	0	1
4	France (FRA)	0	1	0	1
7	Ukraine (UKR)	0	0	2	2
8	Belarus (BLR)	0	0	1	1
8	Poland (POL)	0	0	1	1
Totals (9 entries)		6	6	6	18

=== Men ===
Event	Gold		Silver		Bronze	
15 km Individual	Igor Malinovskii; Russia	39:56.3 (0+0+0+0)	Kirill Streltsov; Russia	41:42.9 (0+0+1+1)	Anton Smolski; Belarus	42:01.9 (0+1+0+0)
10 km Sprint	Nikita Porshnev; Russia	27:26.8 (0+1)	Sebastian Trixl; Austria	27:28.2 (0+1)	Anton Dudchenko; Ukraine	27:34.3 (0+0)
12.5 km Pursuit	Milan Žemlička; Czech Republic	36:06.6 (0+0+1+1)	Ondřej Šantora; Czech Republic	36:22.2 (0+0+0+2)	Anton Dudchenko; Ukraine	36:30.8 (0+1+0+0)

=== Women ===
Event	Gold		Silver		Bronze	
12.5 km Individual	Anna Weidel; Germany	42:00.3 (0+0+0+0)	Myrtille Bègue; France	42:11.0 (0+0+1+0)	Markéta Davidová; Czech Republic	42:38.3 (1+2+0+0)
7.5 km Sprint	Markéta Davidová; Czech Republic	22:24.2 (0+1)	Valeriia Vasnetcova; Russia	22:42.0 (0+1)	Kamila Żuk; Poland	22:49.9 (0+1)
10 km Pursuit	Markéta Davidová; Czech Republic	33:40.7 (0+2+2+2)	Megan Bankes; Canada	33:42.7 (0+0+1+1)	Ksenia Zhuzhgova; Russia	33:48.4 (1+0+0+0)
