= 2023 IBU Open European Championships =

International biathlon competition

- Venue: Roland Arena
- Location: Lenzerheide, Switzerland
- Dates: 25–29 January

The 2023 IBU Open European Championships were held from 25 to 29 January 2023 at the Roland Arena in Lenzerheide, Switzerland.

== Schedule ==
All times are local (UTC+1).

Date	Time	Event
25 January	10:15	Women's 15 km individual
25 January	14:00	Men's 20 km individual
27 January	10:30	Women's 7.5 km sprint
27 January	14:00	Men's 10 km sprint
28 January	10:30	Women's 10 km pursuit
28 January	13:30	Men's 12.5 km pursuit
29 January	10:30	4 × 6 km W+M mixed relay
29 January	13:30	6 km W + 7.5 km M single mixed relay

== Results ==
=== Men's ===
Event	Gold		Silver		Bronze	
20 km individual details	Endre Strømsheim; Norway	51:05.9 (0+0+0+0)	Anton Dudchenko; Ukraine	53:10.6 (0+1+0+0)	Lovro Planko; Slovenia	53:22.4 (1+0+0+0)
10 km sprint details	Erlend Bjøntegaard; Norway	24:57.3 (0+0)	Vebjørn Sørum; Norway	25:08.8 (0+2)	Philipp Nawrath; Germany	25:40.3 (1+1)
12.5 km pursuit details	Vebjørn Sørum; Norway	34:37.5 (1+0+0+1)	Erlend Bjøntegaard; Norway	35:05.6 (0+2+0+0)	Endre Strømsheim; Norway	35:41.2 (0+0+1+2)

=== Women's ===
Event	Gold		Silver		Bronze	
15 km individual details	Lisa Maria Spark; Germany	45:02.4 (0+0+0+0)	Yuliia Dzhima; Ukraine	45:07.9 (0+1+0+0)	Selina Grotian; Germany	45:35.7 (0+0+0+2)
7.5 km sprint details	Anastasiya Merkushyna; Ukraine	23:14.5 (0+0)	Tilda Johansson; Sweden	23:15.0 (1+0)	Vanessa Hinz; Germany	23:16.3 (0+0)
10 km pursuit details	Selina Grotian; Germany	30:25.6 (0+0+1+0)	Tilda Johansson; Sweden	30:43.2 (0+0+0+2)	Gilonne Guigonnat; France	30:49.2 (0+0+0+1)

=== Mixed ===
Event	Gold		Silver		Bronze	
6 km W + 7.5 km M single relay details	Norway Juni Arnekleiv; Endre Strømsheim	34:34.7 (0+1) (0+1) (0+0) (0+0) (0+3) (0+0) (0+1) (0+3)	Switzerland Amy Baserga; Niklas Hartweg	34:51.3 (0+0) (0+2) (0+1) (0+1) (0+0) (0+1) (0+1) (0+3)	France Paula Botet; Émilien Claude	34:55.7 (0+0) (0+3) (0+0) (0+1) (0+0) (0+1) (0+1) (0+1)
4 × 6 km W+M relay details	Norway Maren Kirkeeide; Karoline Erdal; Erlend Bjøntegaard; Vebjørn Sørum	1:03:40.9 (0+1) (0+0) (0+1) (0+0) (0+0) (0+0) (0+0) (0+0)	Germany Lisa Maria Spark; Selina Grotian; Dominic Schmuck; Lucas Fratzscher	1:04:06.0 (0+0) (0+1) (0+1) (0+0) (0+0) (0+1) (0+0) (0+3)	Sweden Tilda Johansson; Stina Nilsson; Malte Stefansson; Anton Ivarsson	1:04:27.7 (0+1) (0+0) (0+1) (0+1) (0+1) (0+3) (0+2) (0+0)

== Medal table ==
* Host nation (Switzerland)

Rank	Nation	Gold	Silver	Bronze	Total
1	Norway	5	2	1	8
2	Germany	2	1	3	6
3	Ukraine	1	2	0	3
4	Sweden	0	2	1	3
5	Switzerland*	0	1	0	1
6	France	0	0	2	2
7	Slovenia	0	0	1	1
Totals (7 entries)		8	8	8	24
