= Tereza Voborníková =

Czech biathlete (born 2000)

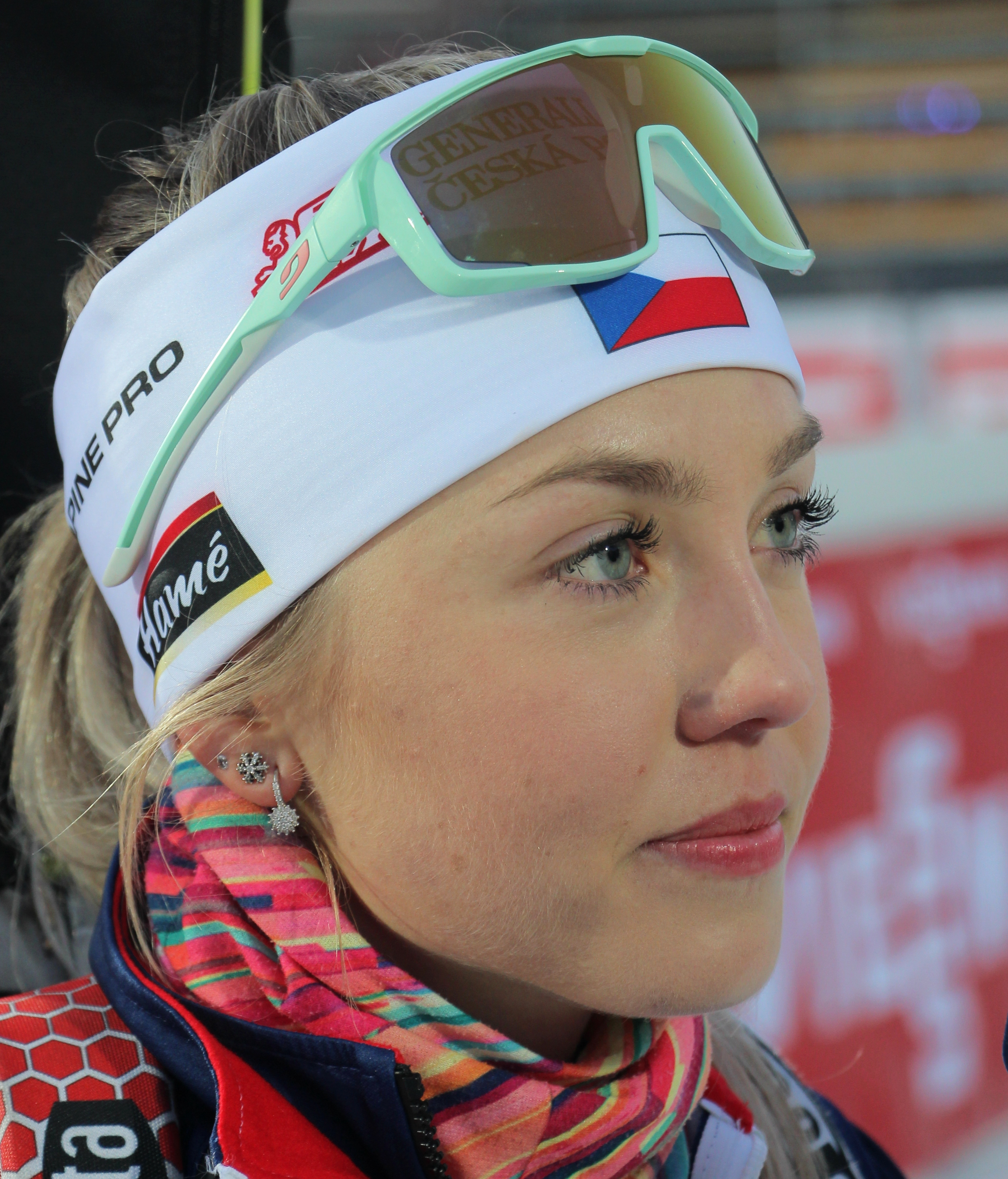
- Voborníková in Nové Město na Moravě in 2023

Personal information
- Born: 31 May 2000 (age 26) Vrchlabí, Czech Republic

Sport

Professional information
- Sport: Biathlon

Olympic Games
- Teams: 2 (2022, 2026)
- Medals: 1 (0 gold)

World Championships
- Teams: 3 (2023–2025)
- Medals: 1 (0 gold)

World Cup
- Seasons: 5 (2021/22–)
- All races: 142
- Individual victories: 0
- All victories: 0
- Individual podiums: 1
- All podiums: 3
Medal record
Women's biathlon
Representing Czech Republic
Olympic Games
Bronze medal – third place	2026 Milano Cortina	12.5 km mass start
World Championships
Silver medal – second place	2025 Lenzerheide	Mixed relay
World Junior Championships
Gold medal – first place	2022 Soldier Hollow	7.5 km sprint
Gold medal – first place	2022 Soldier Hollow	10 km pursuit
Bronze medal – third place	2022 Soldier Hollow	12.5 km individual
World Youth Championships
Silver medal – second place	2019 Osrblie	10 km Individual
Silver medal – second place	2019 Osrblie	7.5 km Pursuit
- Updated on 24 March 2026

Tereza Voborníková (Czech pronunciation: [ˈtɛrɛza ˈvoborɲiːkovaː]; born 31 May 2000) is a Czech biathlete. She competed at the 2022 Winter Olympics in the Women's pursuit, Women's individual, and Women's sprint.

She competed at the Biathlon Junior World Championships 2019, Biathlon Junior World Championships 2022, and 2020–21 Biathlon IBU Cup.

At the 2026 Winter Olympics, she took the bronze medal in the mass start.

== Biathlon results ==
All results are sourced from the International Biathlon Union.

=== Olympic Games ===
1 medal (1 bronze)

Event	Individual	Sprint	Pursuit	Mass start	Relay	Mixed relay
(China) 2022 Beijing	34th	58th	LAP	—N/a	—N/a	—N/a
(Italy) Milano Cortina 2026	15th	19th	18th	Bronze	5th	11th

=== World Championships ===
1 medal

Event	Individual	Sprint	Pursuit	Mass start	Relay	Mixed relay	Single mixed relay
(Germany) 2023 Oberhof	45th	18th	7th	18th	7th	—	14th
(Czech Republic) 2024 Nové Město	52nd	32nd	13th	—	7th	—	—
(Switzerland) 2025 Lenzerheide	24th	71st	—	—	12th	Silver	14th

=== World Cup ===
Season	Age	Overall		Individual		Sprint		Pursuit		Mass start	
Season	Age	Points	Position	Points	Position	Points	Position	Points	Position	Points	Position
2021–22	21	39	66th	12	50th	10	78th	17	59th	-	-
2022–23	22	109	43rd	19	45th	51	40th	27	47th	12	42nd
2023–24	23	409	16th	66	12th	133	16th	126	19th	84	17th
2024–25	24	349	21st	30	36th	109	24th	122	16th	88	20th
2025–26	25	510	12th	103	6th	131	14th	109	20th	167	5th

==== Individual podiums ====
- 0 victories
- 1 podium

No.	Season	Date	Location	Level	Race	Place
1	2025–26	22 March 2026	(Norway) Oslo	World Cup	Mass Start	3rd

==== Team podiums ====
- 0 victories (0 Women, 0 Mixed, 0 Single Mixed)
- 2 podiums (1 Women, 1 Mixed, 0 Single Mixed)

No.	Season	Date	Location	Level	Race	Place	Teammate(s)
1	2025–26	29 November 2025	(Sweden) Ostersund	World Cup	Relay	3rd	Jessica Jislova, Lucie Charvatova, Marketa Davidova
2	2025–26	24 Januar 2026	(Czech Republic) Nové Město na Moravě	World Cup	Relay	3rd	Jessica Jislova, Vitezslav Hornig, Michal Krcmar
