= Campbell Wright =

New Zealand-American biathlete

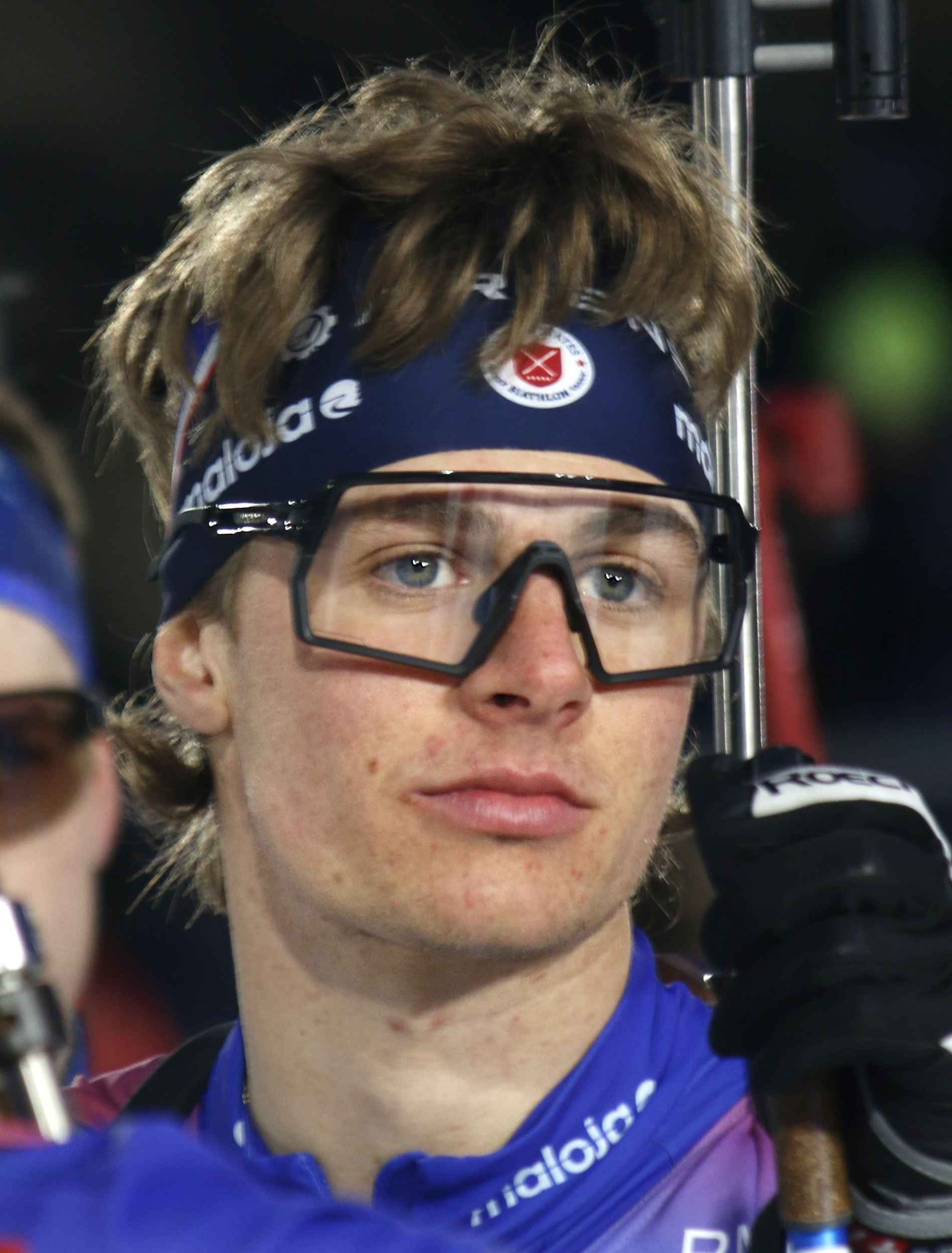
- Wright in 2024

Personal information
- Citizenship: New Zealand; United States
- Born: Campbell McRae Wright; 25 May 2002 (age 24) Rotorua, New Zealand
- Height: 1.84 m (6 ft 0 in)

Sport
- Country: New Zealand (2017–2023); United States (2023–)
- Sport: Biathlon
- Coached by: Emil Bormetti
Medal record
Men's biathlon
Representing New Zealand
Junior World Championships
Gold medal – first place	2023 Shchuchinsk	10 km sprint
Representing United States
World Championships
Silver medal – second place	2025 Lenzerheide	10 km sprint
Silver medal – second place	2025 Lenzerheide	12.5 km pursuit

Campbell McRae Wright (born 25 May 2002) is a New Zealand and American biathlete. He made his Biathlon World Cup debut in 2021 and represented New Zealand at the 2022 Winter Olympics in Beijing. In 2023, he became the first New Zealander and Southern Hemisphere athlete to win a medal in biathlon, after winning the 10 km sprint at the 2023 Junior World Championships. In 2025, he became the most decorated American biathlete in a single World Championship, after winning two silver medals in the Sprint and Pursuit in the 2025 Biathlon World Championships in Lenzerheide, Switzerland.

== Early life ==
Born in Rotorua on 25 May 2002, Wright is one of four sons of Americans Scott and Alison Wright, who emigrated to New Zealand in 1993. Scott Wright, an audiologist, was one of the founders of Bay Audiology New Zealand, and sold his interest in the company in 2009. One of Campbell's brothers is racing cyclist Paul Wright. The family moved to the Wānaka area in 2011. Campbell Wright was educated at Mount Aspiring College.

== Career ==
=== 2016–2021: Early Career ===
Wright began cross-country skiing at Snow Farm when he was ten years old and took up biathlon in 2017. During his mid-teens he spent the Northern Hemisphere winters based in Canada, racing in age group and club competitions, and in 2017 he won the 21 km race at the Merino Muster. He competed at the Biathlon Youth World Championships in 2019, 2020 and 2021, with a best result of sixth in the sprint biathlon in 2020. He represented New Zealand at the 2020 Winter Youth Olympics, where he was the team's flagbearer at the opening ceremony, finishing fourth in the 7.5 km sprint biathlon and sixth in the 12.5 km individual biathlon events. He also competed in three cross-country skiing events at the Winter Youth Olympics.

=== 2021–2022: Senior Debut ===
Wright made his senior international debut at the IBU Cup in January 2021. The following month, he was 75th in the 10 km sprint biathlon at the 2021 Biathlon World Championships. Later that year, in November, he debuted in the Biathlon World Cup in Östersund, where he placed 40th in the sprint biathlon, becoming the second teenager in Biathlon World Cup history, after Ole Einar Bjørndalen, to score World Cup points.

In January 2022, Wright was added to the New Zealand team for the 2022 Winter Olympics in Beijing. He became the second New Zealander to compete in biathlon at a Winter Olympics. In his first event at the Olympics, the 20 km individual, he was the youngest competitor. He finished 32nd in a field of 92 athletes.

=== 2022–2023: Junior World Champion ===
During the season, Wright was coached by and traveled with the U.S. Biathlon Association.

He participated in 2022-23 Biathlon World Cup, scoring a career best in the 10 km sprint in the season opening in Kontiolahti. He later improved on this result when he ranked 20th in the 20 km Individual competition in the 2023 World Championships in Oberhof. He finished the season in the 55th place in the Overall World Cup ranking, collecting 55 points overall.

In the 2023 Junior World Championships, he won a gold medal in the 10 km sprint and became the first New Zealander and Southern Hemisphere athlete to win a medal in biathlon. He later finished 6th in the 12.5 km pursuit competition. These results also placed New Zealand at equal third in medal count in the championship, following Germany and Norway.

=== 2023–2024: Representing the United States ===
On October 23, 2023, The United States Biathlon Association announced the addition of Wright to the US National Biathlon roster. The move was done in collaboration with the New Zealand Biathlon and Olympic association, and was possible due to his double citizenship in New Zealand and the US.

Following disappointing results in the first competitions of the season, he again achieved a career best by placing 12th in 10 km sprint in Rupholding, followed by 17th in the 12.5 km pursuit. In addition, he ran the 1st leg for the 4 x 7.5 km men's relay, in which the U.S. team placed 10th, a season best. In Anterselva-Antholz, he participated in his first single mixed relay, alongside Deedra Irwin, and placed 9th.

He scored another career best in the 2024 World Championships in Nove Mesto na Morave, where he ranked 11th in the 10 km sprint, 12th in the 12.5 km pursuit, 20th in the 20 km Individual, 7th in the single mixed relay (with Irwin), 5th in the men's relay, and 18th in the 15 km mass start.

The following week, he improved on this results when he ranked 8th in the 20 km Individual in Oslo Holmenkollen, and again 7th in the single mixed relay.

As the season concluded in two North American stops, he finished in the flower ceremony for the first time in the World Cup when he ranked 6th in the Sprint in Soldier Hollow, USA. He was also the 3rd leg for the U.S. team's 4th place in the men's relay, the team's best-ever result.

He had a total of 20 Top 20 results throughout the season, including a 13 competition long streak of Top 20 results between January 20, 2024 and March 10, 2024. He had a total of 216 world cup points, and finished 31st in the Overall score.

=== 2024–2025: First Medals, U.S. World Championship Record ===
In 2025, Wright became the first U.S biathlete to win two medals in a World Championship, when he won back-to-back silver medals in the sprint and pursuit competitions. He was the first American biathlete to win a world championship medal since Susan Dunklee in 2020, and first man since Lowell Bailey's gold medal in 2017.

He finished the season in 17th place in the overall score, with 455 points. In addition, he ranked 13th in the sprint and pursuit score, and won the U23 Blue Bib (best biathlete under 23 years old).

== Career results ==
=== Olympic Games ===
0 medals

Event	Individual	Sprint	Pursuit	Mass start	Relay	Mixed relay
Representing New Zealand
(China) 2022 Beijing	32nd	75th	—	—	—	—
Representing United States
(Italy) 2026 Milano Cortina	27th	12th	8th	29th	5th	14th

=== World Championships ===
2 medals (2 silver)

Event	Individual	Sprint	Pursuit	Mass start	Relay	Mixed relay	Single mixed relay
Representing New Zealand
(Slovenia) 2021 Pokljuka	—	74th	—	—	—	—	—
(Germany) 2023 Oberhof	20th	46th	45th	—	—	—	—
Representing United States
(Czech Republic) 2024 Nové Město na Moravě	20th	11th	12th	18th	5th	—	7th
(Switzerland) 2025 Lenzerheide	23rd	Silver	Silver	4th	9th	19th	16th

==== World Cup Individual Podiums ====
One medal (Silver)

No.	Season	Date	Location	Race	Place
1	2025-26	25 January 2026	(Czech Republic) Nové Město	Mass Start	2nd

==== World Cup Team podiums ====
- No Victories
- 1 podiums (1 Mixed)

No.	Season	Date	Location	Race	Place	Teammate(s)
1	2025-26	15 March 2026	(Estonia) Otepää	Mixed Relay	3rd	Maxime Germain, Deedra Irwin, Margie Freed
