= Sondre Slettemark =

Greenlandic biathlete (born 2004)

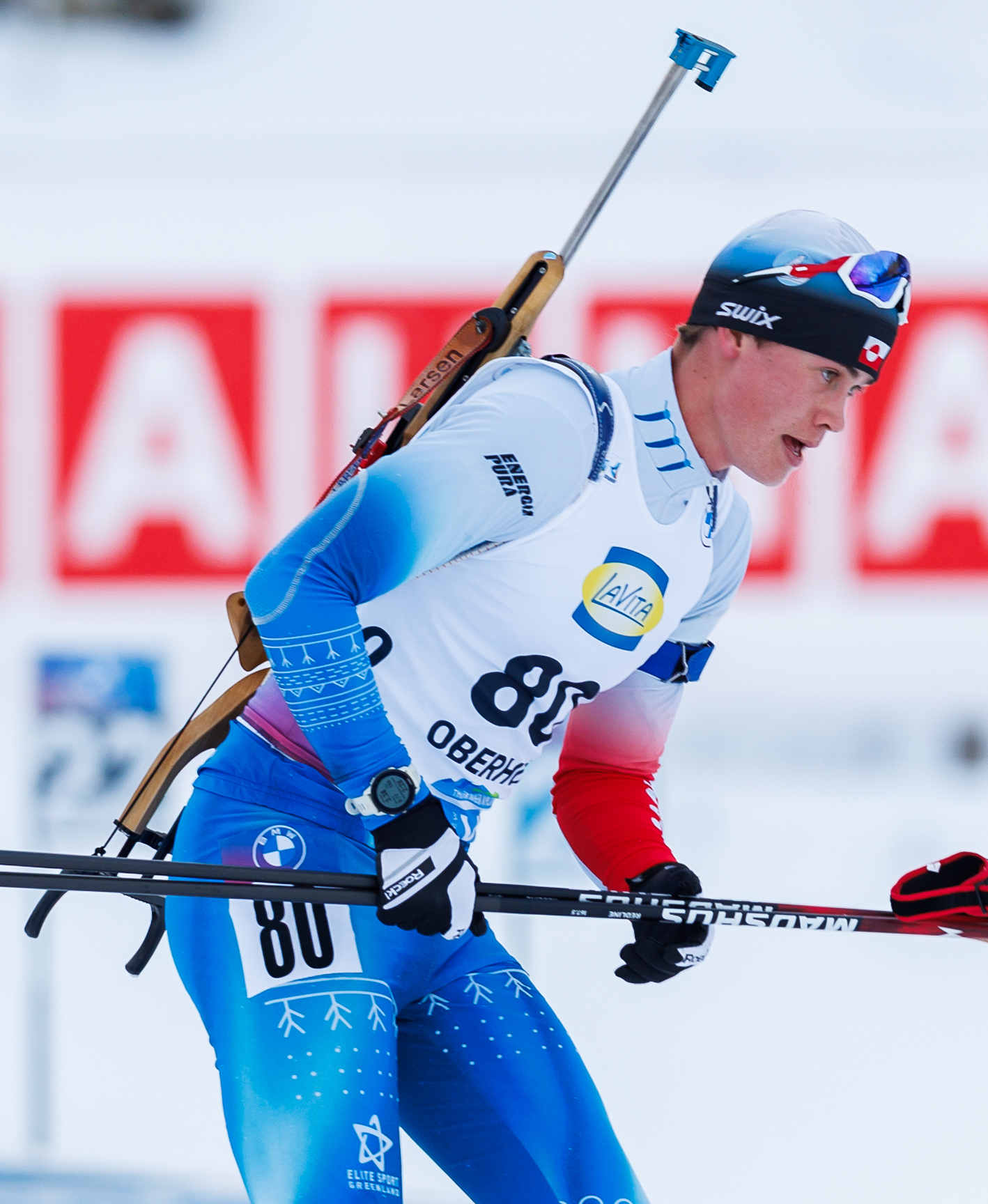
- Slettemark in 2025

Personal information
- Full name: Sondre Aputsiaq Rein Slettemark
- Nationality: Greenlandic
- Born: 10 September 2004 (age 22) Nuuk, Greenland

Sport

Professional information
- Sport: Biathlon
- Club: Geilo IL
- World Cup debut: 26 November 2023

Olympic Games
- Teams: 1 (2026)

World Championships
- Teams: 1 (2025)
- Updated on 4 February 2025

Sondre Aputsiaq Rein Slettemark (born 10 September 2004 in Nuuk) is a Greenlandic biathlete. He made his debut in the world cup in Östersund on 26 November 2023. He participated at the 2025 Biathlon World Championships in Lenzerheide, Switzerland. He competed for Denmark at the 2026 Winter Olympics.

Slettemark parents are also biathletes, his father Øystein competed at the 2010 Winter Olympics representing Denmark, his mother Uiloq participated at the 2012 World Championships. His sister Ukaleq made her debut in the Biathlon World Championships 2021.

== Biathlon results ==
All results are sourced from the International Biathlon Union.

=== Olympic Games ===
Event	Individual	Sprint	Pursuit	Mass start	Relay	Mixed relay
(Italy) 2026 Milano Cortina	62nd	60th	54th	—	—	—

=== World Championships ===
Event	Individual	Sprint	Pursuit	Mass start	Relay	Mixed relay	Single mixed relay
(Switzerland) 2025 Lenzerheide	69th	—	—	—	—	—	23rd

=== Youth and Junior World Championships ===
0 medals

Year	Age	Individual	Sprint	Pursuit
(Austria) 2021 Obertilliach	16	25th	24th	23th
(United States) 2022 Soldier Hollow	17	33rd	20th	26th
(Kazakhstan) 2023 Shchuchinsk	18	33rd	28th	22nd

== See also ==
- List of professional sports families
