= Lovro Planko =

Slovenian biathlete (born 2001)

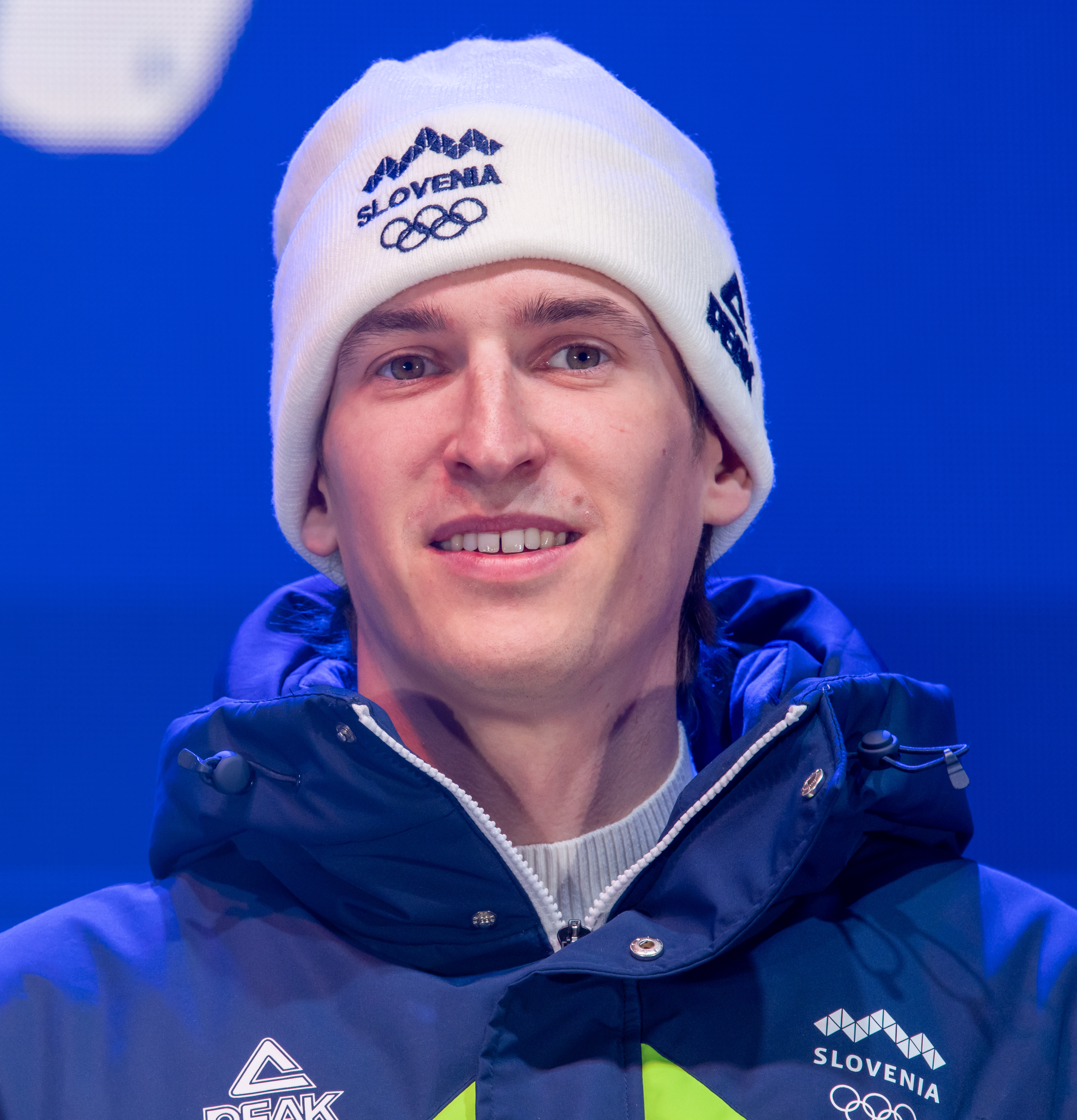
- Planko in 2026

Personal information
- Born: 28 May 2001 (age 25) Ljubljana, Slovenia

Sport

Professional information
- Sport: Biathlon
- Club: SK Ihan
- World Cup debut: 2017
Medal record
Men's biathlon
Representing Slovenia
European Championships
Bronze medal – third place	2023 Lenzerheide	20 km individual
Youth World Championships
Silver medal – second place	2019 Osrblie	7,5 km sprint
Silver medal – second place	2019 Osrblie	3 x 7,5 km relay
Bronze medal – third place	2020 Lenzerheide	10 km pursuit
European Youth Olympic Winter Festival
Silver medal – second place	2019 Sarajevo	7,5 km sprint

Lovro Planko (born 28 May 2001) is a Slovenian biathlete. He competed four-times at the Junior World Championships. He represented Slovenia at the 2022 Olympic Games in Beijing, China and at the 2026 Olympic Games in Cortina d'Ampezzo, Italy.

== Career ==
He first competed at Junior World Cup in Pokljuka, Slovenia in 2017. He made a debut in Junior IBU Cup in 2018 in Lenzerheide, Switzerland. He made his breakthrough to the international level when he won a silver medal in the 7.5 km sprint in 2019 at the 2019 European Youth Olympic Winter Festival in Sarajevo. He won bronze medal in 20 km Individual at the 2023 European Championships in Lenzerheide, Switzerland.

== Biathlon results ==
All results are sourced from the International Biathlon Union.

=== Olympic Games ===
Event	Individual	Sprint	Pursuit	Mass start	Relay	Mixed relay
(China) 2022 Beijing	46th	42nd	56th	—	11th	—
(Italy) 2026 Milano Cortina	48th	34th	31st			13th

=== World Championships ===
0 medals

Event	Individual	Sprint	Pursuit	Mass start	Relay	Mixed relay	Single mixed relay
(Germany) 2023 Oberhof	55th	33rd	29th	—	—	—	—
(Czech Republic) 2024 Nové Město na Moravě	32nd	34th	38th	—	11th	—	—
(Switzerland) 2025 Lenzerheide	71st	49th	48th	—	13th	11th	—

*During Olympic seasons, competitions are only held for those events not included in the Olympic program.

=== European Championships ===
Event	Individual	Sprint	Pursuit	Relay
(Switzerland) 2023 Lenzerheide	Bronze	55th	44th	10th

=== Junior/Youth World Championships ===
3 medals (2 silver, 1 bronze)

Event	Individual	Sprint	Pursuit	Relay
(Slovakia) 2017 Osrblie	37th	56th	38th	11th
(Estonia) 2018 Otepää	28th	38th	36th	5th
(Slovakia) 2019 Osrblie	24th	Silver	10th	Silver
(Switzerland) 2020 Lenzerheide	15th	8th	Bronze	4th
(Austria) 2021 Obertilliach	43rd	14th	20th	4th
(United States) 2022 Soldier Hollow	27th	11th	7th	5th
(Kazakhstan) 2023 Shchuchinsk	53rd	16th	21st	15th
