= Amy Baserga =

Swiss biathlete (born 2000)

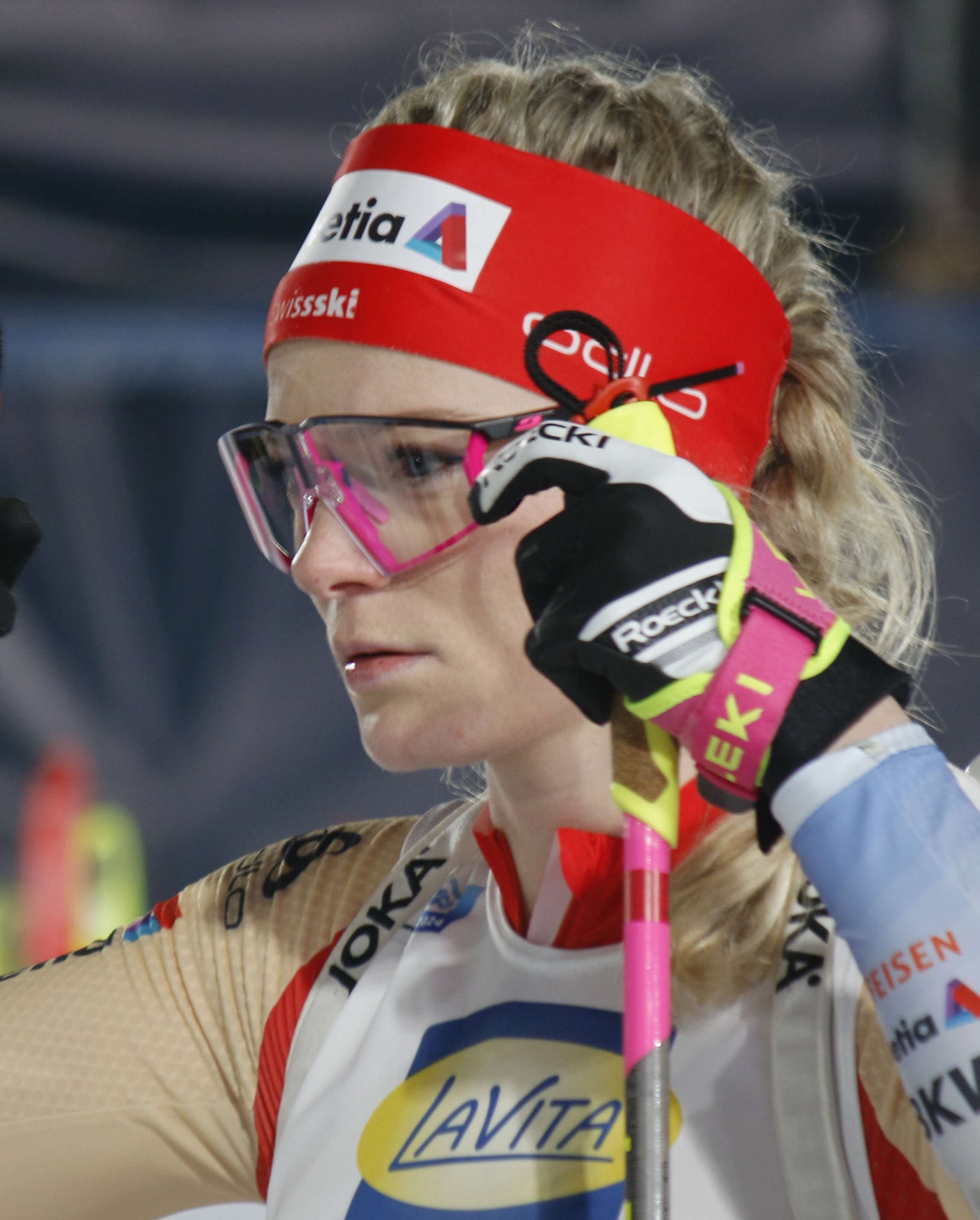
- Amy Baserga in 2024

Personal information
- Nationality: Switzerland
- Born: 29 September 2000 (age 25) Zürich, Switzerland

Sport
- Sport: Biathlon
- Club: SC Einsiedeln
Medal record
Women's biathlon
Representing Switzerland
European Championships
Silver medal – second place	2023 Lenzerheide	Single mixed relay
Junior World Championships
Gold medal – first place	2021 Obertilliach	7.5 km sprint
Gold medal – first place	2021 Obertilliach	10 km pursuit
Bronze medal – third place	2020 Lenzerheide	12.5 km individual
Youth World Championships
Gold medal – first place	2019 Osrblie	7.5 km pursuit
Silver medal – second place	2019 Osrblie	6 km sprint
Bronze medal – third place	2018 Otepää	7.5 km pursuit

Amy Baserga (born 29 September 2000) is a Swiss biathlete. She competed in the 2022 Winter Olympics.

== Career ==
Baserga was a successful junior competitor in biathlon, winning six medals at the Biathlon Junior World Championships. She competed in four biathlon events at the 2022 Winter Olympics. She was part of the Swiss team in the mixed relay, placing 8th out of 20 teams. She placed 69th out of 89 competitors in the individual event, 54th out of 89 competitors in the sprint, and 39th out of 60 competitors in the pursuit.

== Personal life ==
Baserga also participated in athletics, ski jumping, and cross-country skiing before starting biathlon after her older brother Tim discovered the sport in 2007.

== Career results ==
=== Olympic Games ===
0 medals

Event	Individual	Sprint	Pursuit	Mass start	Relay	Mixed relay
(China) 2022 Beijing	69th	54th	39th	—	DNF	8th
(Italy) 2026 Milano Cortina	39th	29th	27th	21st	8th	10th

=== World Championships ===
0 medals

Event	Individual	Sprint	Pursuit	Mass start	Relay	Mixed relay	Single mixed relay
(Germany) 2023 Oberhof	38th	39th	26th	—	8th	—	—
(Czech Republic) 2024 Nové Město na Moravě	51st	54th	54th	—	9th	4th	—
(Switzerland) 2025 Lenzerheide	19th	61st	—	—	14th	6th	4th
