= Vítězslav Hornig =

Czech biathlete (born 1999)

- Hornig in 2026

Personal information
- Nationality: Czech
- Born: 26 April 1999 (age 27) Jilemnice, Czech Republic

Sport
- Country: Czech Republic
- Sport: Biathlon
Medal record
Men's biathlon
Representing Czech Republic
World Championships
| Silver medal – second place | 2025 Lenzerheide | Mixed relay |
Junior World Championships
| Bronze medal – third place | 2021 Obertilliach | 4 × 7.5 km relay |
Youth World Championships
| Silver medal – second place | 2018 Otepää | 3 × 7.5 km relay |
| Bronze medal – third place | 2018 Otepää | 7.5 km sprint |

Vítězslav Hornig (born 26 April 1999) is a Czech biathlete. He made his debut in the Biathlon World Cup in 2019.

== Career ==
Vítězslav Hornig made his international debut at the 2016 Biathlon Junior World Championships, finishing 43rd, 44th, and 46th. He also competed in the 2016 Winter Youth Olympics, placing 9th with the mixed relay, 14th in the sprint, and 22nd in the pursuit. During the 2016–17 season, he participated in two IBU Junior Cup races, finishing 43rd and 53rd. In the 2017–18 season, Hornig competed regularly in the IBU Junior Cup, achieving his first top-10 result in Nové Město na Moravě. At the 2018 Junior European Championships, he won bronze in the individual race and placed 7th with the relay. At the Junior World Championships in Otepää, he won bronze in the sprint and silver with the relay, while finishing 12th in the individual race. He also claimed three medals at the Junior Summer Biathlon World Championships: gold in the men's relay, and bronze in the sprint and pursuit.

Hornig transitioned to the IBU Cup in 2018–19, consistently scoring points with a best finish of 17th. Despite no medals at the Junior World or European Championships, he placed in the top 10 in all races at the Junior Summer Biathlon World Championships, winning silver in the supersprint. In 2019–20, Hornig achieved his first IBU Cup podium with 2nd place in a sprint in Brezno-Osrblie and debuted in the World Cup, finishing 71st in Annecy-Le Grand-Bornand. At the Junior European Championships, he won gold in the individual race and silver in the sprint, becoming one of the most successful athletes of the event. At the senior European Championships, he placed 14th, 51st, and 57th in individual races. In 2020–21, Hornig competed internationally starting in February, with modest results in the IBU Cup. However, he excelled at the Junior World Championships, placing in the top 10 across all events and winning bronze with the men's relay. He also returned to the World Cup in March, finishing 50th in the sprint and 56th in the pursuit in Nové Město na Moravě.

In the 2024–25 season, at the opening event in Kontiolahti, Finland, he achieved a new individual career best by finishing 15th in the mass start race.

== Biathlon results ==
All results are sourced from the International Biathlon Union.

=== Olympic Games ===
0 medal

| Event | Individual | Sprint | Pursuit | Mass start | Relay | Mixed relay |
|---|---|---|---|---|---|---|
| (Italy) 2026 Milano Cortina | 26th | 20th | 19th | 19th | 6th | 11th |

=== World Championships ===
| Event | Individual | Sprint | Pursuit | Mass start | Relay | Mixed relay | Single Mixed relay |
|---|---|---|---|---|---|---|---|
| (Czech Republic) 2024 Nové Město na Moravě | 46th | — | — | — | 7th | — | — |
| (Switzerland) 2025 Lenzerheide | 27th | 29th | 22nd | — | 6th | Silver | 14th |

=== World Cup ===
| Season | Overall | | | Individual | | Sprint | | Pursuit | | Mass start | |
| Season | Races | Points | Position | Points | Position | Points | Position | Points | Position | Points | Position |
|---|---|---|---|---|---|---|---|---|---|---|---|
| 2019–20 | 1/21 | Did not earn World Cup points | | | | | | | | | |
| 2020–21 | 3/26 | Did not earn World Cup points | | | | | | | | | |
| 2021–22 | 5/22 | Did not earn World Cup points | | | | | | | | | |
| 2022–23 | 2/21 | Did not earn World Cup points | | | | | | | | | |
| 2023–24 | 10/21 | 1 | 92nd | — | — | — | — | 1 | 79th | — | — |
| 2024–25 | 18/21 | 391 | 20th | 64 | 19th | 129 | 23th | 107 | 21st | 91 | 20th |

=== Youth and Junior World Championships ===
3 medals (1 silver, 2 bronze)

| Year | Age | Individual | Sprint | Pursuit | Relay |
|---|---|---|---|---|---|
| (Romania) 2016 Cheile Grădiştei | 16 | 46th | 43rd | 44th | — |
| (Estonia) 2018 Otepää | 18 | 12th | Bronze | DNS | Silver |
| (Slovakia) 2019 Brezno-Osrblie | 19 | 14th | 38th | 27th | 6th |
| (Switzerland) 2020 Lenzerheide | 20 | 17th | 18th | 10th | 6th |
| (Austria) 2021 Obertilliach | 21 | 10th | 8th | 6th | Bronze |
