= Alex Cisar =

Slovenian biathlete

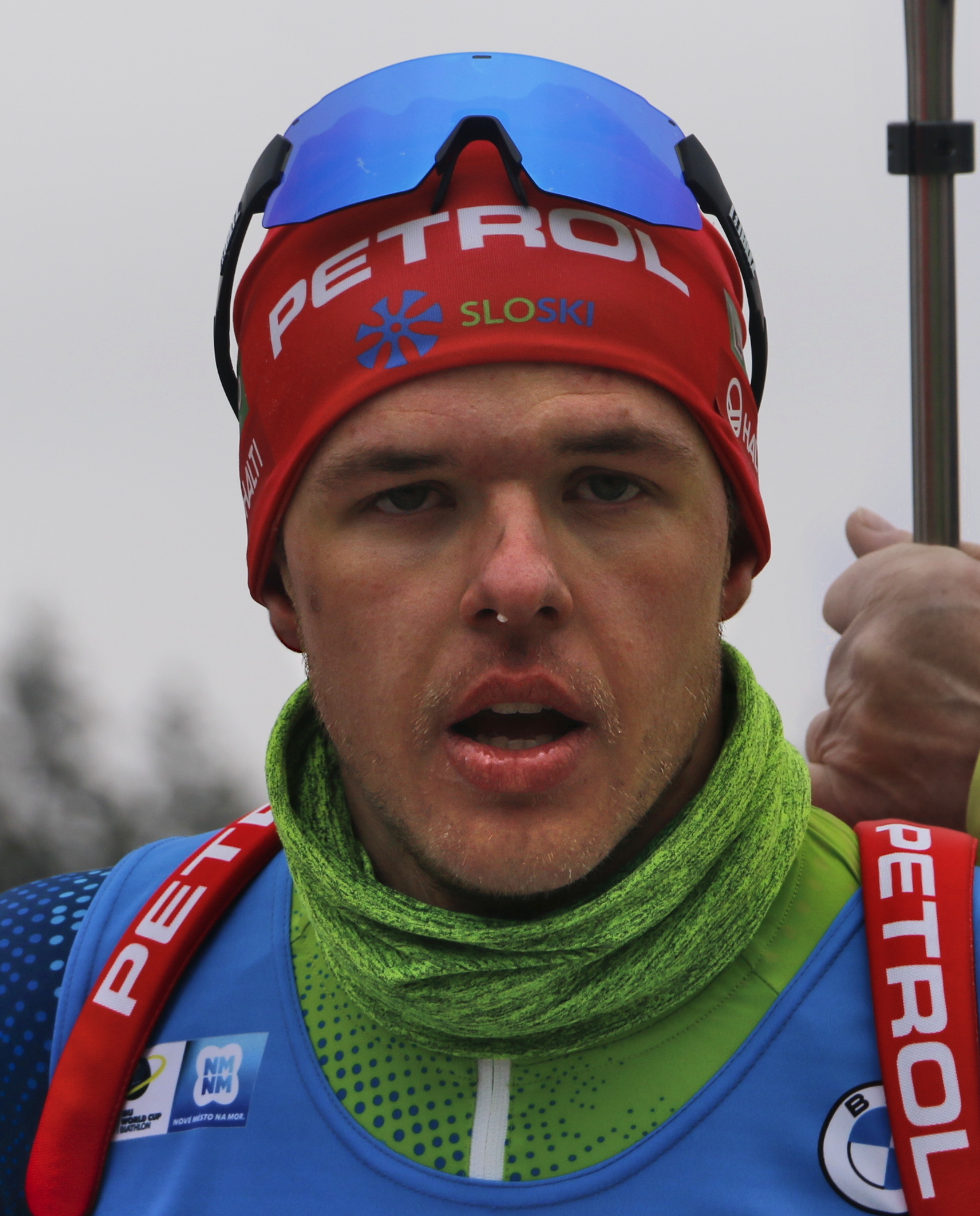
- Cisar in 2023

Personal information
- Born: 5 April 2000 (age 26) Kranj, Slovenia

Sport

Professional information
- Sport: Biathlon
- Club: TSK Triglav
Medal record
Men's biathlon
Representing Slovenia
Junior World Championships
Silver medal – second place	2021 Obertilliach	15 km Individual
Bronze medal – third place	2020 Lenzerheide	12 km Pursuit
Youth World Championships
Gold medal – first place	2019 Osrblie	10 km Pursuit
Gold medal – first place	2019 Osrblie	7,5 km Sprint
Silver medal – second place	2019 Osrblie	3 x 7,5 km relay

Alex Cisar (born 5 April 2000) is a Slovenian biathlete. He is a two-time Biathlon Junior World champion in Pursuit and Sprint.

== Biathlon results ==
All results are sourced from the International Biathlon Union.

=== World Championships ===
0 medals

Event	Individual	Sprint	Pursuit	Mass start	Relay	Mixed relay	Single mixed relay
(Italy) 2020 Rasen-Antholz	—	—	—	—	—	—	19th
(Slovenia) 2021 Pokljuka	47th	—	—	—	8th	—	—
(Germany) 2023 Oberhof	19th	54th	30th	17th	9th	—	—

=== Junior/Youth World Championships ===
5 medals (2 gold, 2 silver, 1 bronze)

Event	Individual	Sprint	Pursuit	Relay
(Romania) 2016 Cheile Grădiştei	35th	14th	13th	12th
(Slovakia) 2017 Osrblie	9th	21st	15th	11th
(Estonia) 2018 Otepää	11th	4th	7th	5th
(Slovakia) 2019 Osrblie	8th	Gold	Gold	Silver
(Switzerland) 2020 Lenzerheide	16th	11th	Bronze	10th
(Austria) 2021 Obertilliach	Silver	22nd	7th	4th
(United States) 2022 Soldier Hollow	28th	20th	23rd	5th
