= Anton Dudchenko =

Ukrainian biathlete (born 1996)

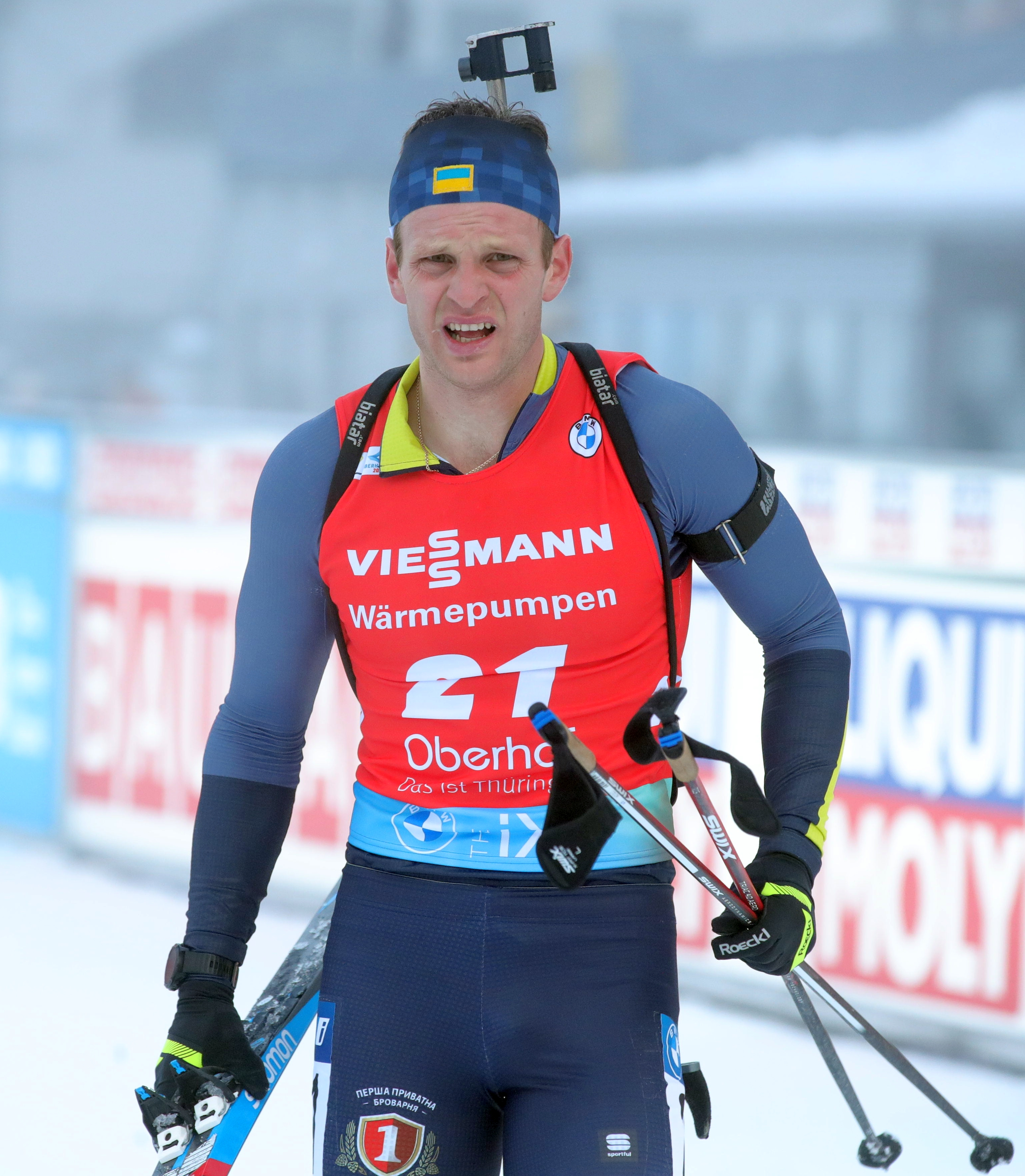
- Dudchenko in 2023

Personal information
- Nationality: Ukrainian
- Born: 17 December 1996 (age 29) Vyry, Sumy Oblast, Ukraine

Sport
- Country: Ukraine
- Sport: Biathlon
Medal record
Men's biathlon
Representing Ukraine
European Championships
Silver medal – second place	2023 Lenzerheide	20 km Individual
Junior European Championships
Silver medal – second place	2016 Pokljuka	20 km Individual
Bronze medal – third place	2016 Pokljuka	12.5 km Pursuit
Bronze medal – third place	2017 Nove Mesto	10 km Sprint
Bronze medal – third place	2017 Nove Mesto	12.5 km Pursuit

Anton Romanovych Dudchenko (Ukrainian: Антон Романович Дудченко, born 17 December 1996) is a Ukrainian biathlete. He has competed in the Biathlon World Cup since 2019.

== Biathlon results ==
All results are sourced from the International Biathlon Union.

=== Olympic Games ===
0 medals

Event	Individual	Sprint	Pursuit	Mass start	Relay	Mixed relay
(China) 2022 Beijing	50th	60th	23rd	—	9th	—
(Italy) 2026 Milano Cortina	35th	88th	—	—	—	—

=== World Championships ===
0 medals

Event	Individual	Sprint	Pursuit	Mass start	Relay	Mixed relay	Single Mixed relay
(Italy) 2020 Antholz	68th	60th	60th	—	—	—	—
(Slovenia) 2021 Pokljuka	45th	77th	—	—	5th	—	—
(Germany) 2023 Oberhof	42nd	21st	20th	25th	13th	10th	—
(Czech Republic) 2024 Nové Město na Moravě	29th	39th	25th	20th	13th	—	—
(Switzerland) 2025 Lenzerheide	50th	35th	47th	—	8th	8th	20th

*During Olympic seasons competitions are only held for those events not included in the Olympic program.

=== World Cup ===
Season	Overall			Individual		Sprint		Pursuit		Mass start	
Season	Races	Points	Position	Points	Position	Points	Position	Points	Position	Points	Position
2019–20	15/21	60	58th	—	—	27	57th	33	37th	—	—
2020–21	15/26	84	51st	40	27th	21	63rd	11	66th	12	44th
2021–22	11/22	126	39th	17	36th	61	41st	48	39th	—	—
2022–23	15/21	163	35th	40	26th	40	39th	58	33rd	25	36th
2023–24	13/21	20	70th	7	57th	4	69th	9	64th	—	—
2024–25	16/21	180	35th	42	27th	62	36th	39	36th	29	34th

==== Relay podiums ====
- 1 podium

No.	Season	Date	Location	Level	Race	Placement	Teammate
1	2024–25	9 March 2025	(Czech Republic) Nové Město na Moravě	World Cup	Relay	3rd	Tyshchenko, Mandzyn, Pidruchnyi
