= Vebjørn Sørum =

Norwegian biathlete (born 1998)

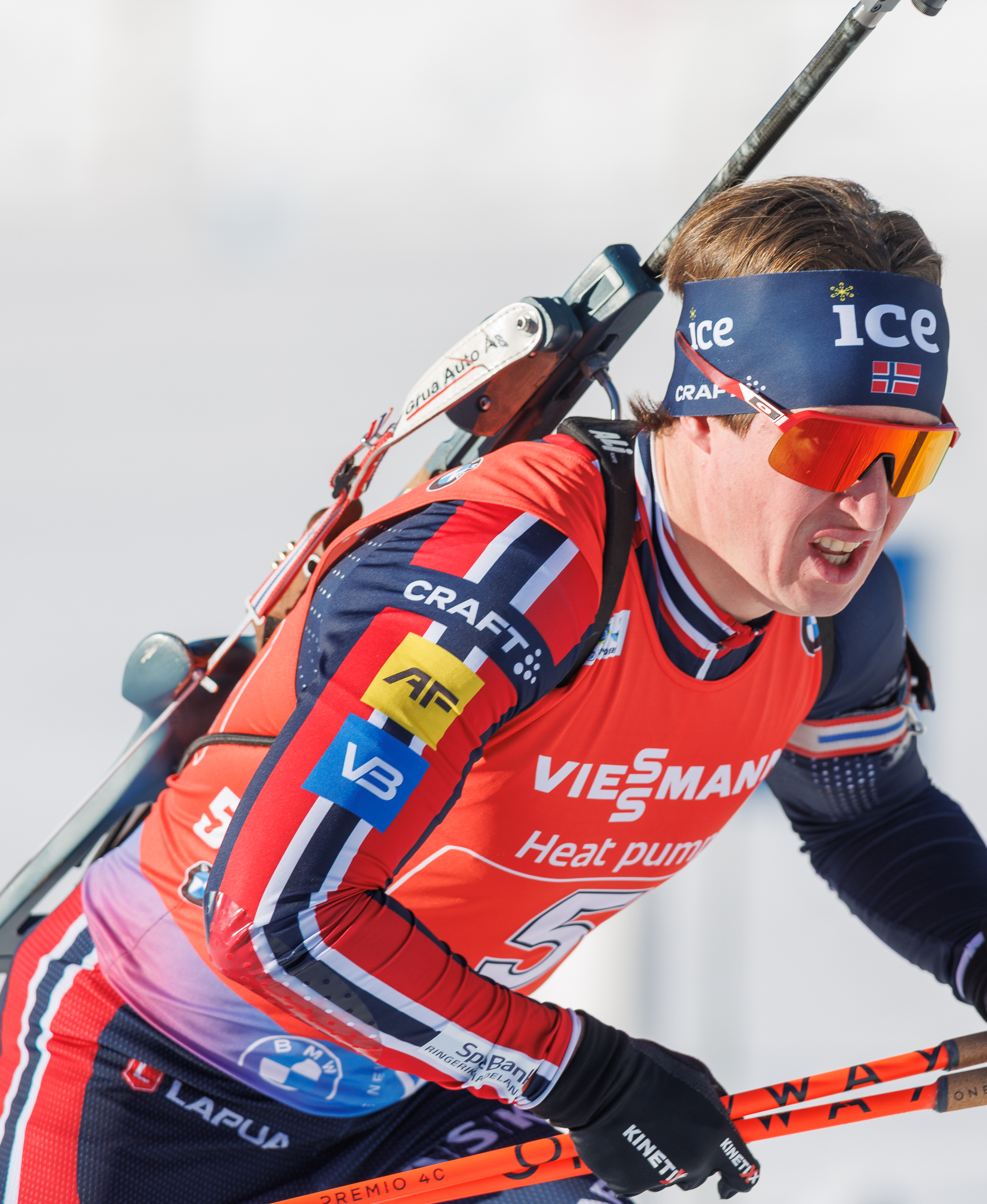
- Sørum in 2025

Personal information
- Born: 11 August 1998 (age 27) Gjøvik, Norway

Sport
- Country: Norway
- Sport: Biathlon

World Championships
- Teams: 1 (2025)

World Cup
- Seasons: 3 (2023–2025)
- Individual races: 39
- All races: 44
- Individual victories: 1
- All victories: 3
- Individual podiums: 3
- All podiums: 6
Medal record
Men's biathlon
Representing Norway
European Championships
Gold medal – first place	2023 Lenzerheide	12.5 km pursuit
Gold medal – first place	2023 Lenzerheide	Mixed relay
Gold medal – first place	2024 Osrblie	20 km individual
Silver medal – second place	2023 Lenzerheide	10 km sprint
Silver medal – second place	2024 Osrblie	Single mixed relay
- Updated on 23 March 2025

Vebjørn Sørum (born 11 August 1998) is a Norwegian biathlete. He has competed in the Biathlon World Cup since 2023.

== Career ==
Vebjørn Sørum began his international career in 2017 at the Junior World Championships in Brezno. After finishing 39th in the individual event, 27th in the sprint, and making a remarkable comeback in the pursuit (8th place), he won the world title in the young men's relay, alongside Jorgen Krogsaeter and Sivert Guttorm Bakken.

He was absent from the international competition the following season and made his IBU Cup debut in 2018, finishing 40th in the sprint in Idre. A few weeks later, he stepped onto his first podium after the mixed relay (with Karoline Knotten, Eline Grue, and Frederik Gjesbakk, securing third place). He achieved a sprint-pursuit double at the 2019 Junior World Championships and also earned two silver medals at the Junior European Championships in Sjusjøen (individual and relay).

In the subsequent season, Sørum returned to the IBU Cup competition after the 2020 Junior World Championships in Lenzerheide, winning new medals - silver in the individual and gold in the sprint. He then claimed his first individual podium on the senior circuit (IBU Cup) by winning the super sprint in Martell, surpassing German biathlete Simon Schempp.

After only two races in the IBU Cup during the 2021/2022 winter season, he started the 2022/2023 season on the national team. However, he quickly regained his place in the Norwegian B team and returned to the IBU Cup in January 2023. In excellent form on skis and precise behind the rifle, he achieved 7 individual podiums, including 3 victories in just 12 races. At the 2023 European Championships in Lenzerheide, he won silver in the sprint, gold in the pursuit, and gold in the mixed relay (with Maren Kirkeeide, Karoline Erdal, and Erlend Bjøntegaard). He finished 3rd in the overall IBU Cup standings and, following the positive Covid-19 tests of Tarjei Bø, Johannes Thingnes Bø and Sturla Holm Lægreid, had the opportunity to make his World Cup debut in the last two stages of the 2022-2023 season in Östersund and Oslo.

After a 45th-place finish in the individual event, he had joining the Norwegian quartet for the relay. He securing victory with Endre Strømsheim, Johannes Dale-Skjevdal, and Vetle Sjåstad Christiansen, stepping onto the World Cup podium for the first time in his debut stage.

== Biathlon results ==
All results are sourced from the International Biathlon Union.

=== World Championships ===
0 medal

Event	Individual	Sprint	Pursuit	Mass start	Relay	Mixed relay	Single mixed relay
(Switzerland) 2025 Lenzerheide	45th	4th	25th	14th	—	—	—

*During Olympic seasons competitions are only held for those events not included in the Olympic program.
**The single mixed relay was added as an event in 2019.

=== World Cup ===
Season	Overall			Individual		Sprint		Pursuit		Mass start	
Season	Races	Points	Position	Points	Position	Points	Position	Points	Position	Points	Position
2022–23	3/21	26	71st	—	—	18	56th	8	68th	—	—
2023–24	13/21	295	26th	17	46th	98	25th	74	29th	106	15th
2024–25	19/21	651	9th	90	8th	234	8th	198	9th	129	14th

==== Individual podiums ====
- 1 victories (1 Ind)
- 3 podiums

No.	Season	Date	Location	Level	Race	Place
1	2023–24	2 December 2023	(Sweden) Östersund	World Cup	Sprint	3rd
2	2023–24	21 January 2024	(Italy) Antholz-Anterselva	World Cup	Mass Start	3rd
3	2024–25	15 January 2025	(Germany) Ruhpolding	World Cup	Individual	1st

==== Relay podiums ====
- 2 victories (1 RL, 1 MR)
- 3 podiums

No.	Season	Date	Location	Level	Race	Place	Teammate(s)
1	2022–23	11 March 2023	(Sweden) Östersund	World Cup	Relay	1st	Strømsheim, Dale, Christiansen
2	2024–25	30 November 2024	(Finland) Kontiolahti	World Cup	Mixed Relay	1st	Knotten, Tandrevold, Dale-Skjevdal
3	2024–25	15 December 2024	(Austria) Hochfilzen	World Cup	Relay	2nd	Lægreid, Bø, Bø

=== Youth and Junior World Championships ===
5 medals (4 gold, 1 silver)

Year	Age	Individual	Sprint	Pursuit	Relay
(Slovakia) 2017 Brezno-Osrblie	18	39th	27th	8th	Gold
(Slovakia) 2019 Brezno-Osrblie	20	49th	Gold	Gold	4th
(Switzerland) 2020 Lenzerheide	21	Silver	Gold	6th	4th
