= Biathlon Junior World Championships 2019 =

Biathlon event in Slovakia

2019 IBU Youth & Junior World Championships
- Host city: Osrblie, Slovakia
- Dates: 27 January – 3 February
- Events: 16
- Website: osrblie2019.biathlon.sk

The 2019 Biathlon Junior World Championships was held in Osrblie, Slovakia from 27 January to 3 February 2019. There was a total of 16 competitions: sprint, pursuit, individual and relay races for men and women.

== Schedule ==
All times are local (UTC+1).

Date	Time	Event
27 January	11:00	Youth Men's 12.5 km individual
27 January	14:00	Youth Women's 10 km individual
28 January	11:00	Junior Men's 15 km individual
28 January	14:00	Junior Women's 12.5 km individual
29 January	11:00	Youth Men's 3 × 7.5 km relay
29 January	14:00	Youth Women's 3 × 6 km relay
30 January	11:00	Junior Men's 4 × 7.5 km relay
30 January	14:30	Junior Women's 3 × 6 km relay
1 February	11:00	Youth Men's 7.5 km sprint
1 February	14:00	Youth Women's 6 km sprint
2 February	11:00	Junior Men's 10 km sprint
2 February	14:00	Junior Women's 7.5 km sprint
3 February	11:00	Junior Men's 12.5 km pursuit
3 February	12:00	Junior Women's 10 km pursuit
3 February	14:15	Youth Men's 10 km pursuit
3 February	15:20	Youth Women's 7.5 km pursuit

== Results ==
=== Junior events ===
==== Junior Men ====
Event	Gold		Silver		Bronze	
15 km Individual details	Martin Bourgeois République; France	44:30.1 (1+0+0+0)	Mikita Labastau; Belarus	44:33.0 (0+0+1+0)	Danilo Riethmüller; Germany	44:34.3 (0+0+2+0)
10 km Sprint details	Vebjørn Sørum; Norway	25:42.9 (0+0)	Said Karimulla Khalili; Russia	25:57.3 (0+0)	Sivert Guttorm Bakken; Norway	26:19.2 (1+0)
12.5 km Pursuit details	Vebjørn Sørum; Norway	32:47.2 (1+0+1+0)	Martin Bourgeois République; France	32:53.4 (0+0+0+0)	Sivert Guttorm Bakken; Norway	32:59.8 (1+0+1+1)
4 × 7.5 km Relay details	Russia; Said Karimulla Khalili; Ilnaz Mukhamedzianov; Vadim Istamgulov; Vasilii Tomshin	1:20:13.5 (0+0) (0+1) (0+2) (1+3) (0+1) (0+1) (0+0) (0+1)	Germany; Julian Hollandt; Tim Grotian; Philipp Lipowitz; Danilo Riethmüller	1:20:14.5 (0+0) (0+0) (0+0) (0+3) (0+0) (0+1) (0+0) (0+0)	Italy; Michael Durand; Patrick Braunhofer; Cedric Christille; Daniele Cappellari	1:20:15.3 (0+0) (0+0) (0+1) (0+1) (0+1) (0+0) (0+0) (0+0)

==== Junior Women ====
Event	Gold		Silver		Bronze	
12.5 km Individual details	Meng Fanqi; China	40:06.7 (0+0+0+0)	Juliane Frühwirt; Germany	41:15.5 (0+1+0+0)	Franziska Pfnür; Germany	41:42.5 (0+0+0+0)
7.5 km Sprint details	Ekaterina Bekh; Ukraine	21:03.6 (0+0)	Kamila Żuk; Poland	21:15.7 (1+1)	Hanna Kebinger; Germany	21:17.6 (0+0)
10 km Pursuit details	Ekaterina Bekh; Ukraine	31:23.8 (1+0+1+0)	Hanna Kebinger; Germany	31:32.9 (0+1+0+0)	Sophie Chauveau; France	31:40.2 (0+1+0+2)
3 × 6 km Relay details	France; Camille Bened; Sophie Chauveau; Lou Jeanmonnot	54:26.4 (0+0) (0+0) (0+0) (0+0) (0+0) (0+1)	Germany; Franziska Pfnür; Hanna Kebinger; Juliane Frühwirt	54:41.5 (0+0) (0+0) (0+0) (0+1) (0+2) (0+0)	Sweden; Amanda Lundström; Annie Lind; Elvira Öberg	55:03.0 (0+0) (0+0) (0+3) (0+0) (0+0) (0+1)

=== Youth events ===
==== Youth Men ====
Event	Gold		Silver		Bronze	
12.5 km Individual details	Niklas Hartweg; Switzerland	35:37.1 (0+1+0+0)	Trym Gerhardsen; Norway	36:02.4 (0+1+0+0)	Jakub Kocián; Czech Republic	36:10.8 (0+0+0+1)
7.5 km Sprint details	Alex Cisar; Slovenia	20:27.3 (1+0)	Lovro Planko; Slovenia	20:57.9 (0+1)	Otto Invenius; Finland	20:58.7 (1+0)
10 km Pursuit details	Alex Cisar; Slovenia	27:59.7 (0+0+0+1)	Rémi Broutier; France	28:59.3 (1+0+0+0)	Vetle Paulsen; Norway	29:42.8 (1+1+0+1)
3 × 7.5 km Relay details	Germany; Hendrik Rudolph; Darius Lodl; Hans Köllner	1:01:50.6 (0+0) (0+3) (0+1) (0+0) (0+1) (0+0)	Slovenia; Anton Vidmar; Lovro Planko; Alex Cisar	1:02:31.5 (0+0) (0+3) (0+2) (1+3) (0+1) (0+0)	Italy; Bionaz Leonesio; Tommaso Giacomel; Didier Bionaz	1:02:31.9 (0+0) (0+2) (0+1) (0+1) (0+1) (0+0)

==== Youth Women ====
Event	Gold		Silver		Bronze	
10 km Individual details	Ukaleq Astri Slettemark; Greenland	31:49.3 (0+0+0+0)	Tereza Voborníková; Czech Republic	33:04.1 (0+1+0+0)	Heidi Nikkinen; Finland	33:09.6 (2+0+0+0)
6 km Sprint details	Maren Bakken; Norway	17:31.6 (0+0)	Amy Baserga; Switzerland	17:56.4 (1+0)	Marte Møller; Norway	18:01.1 (0+0)
7.5 km Pursuit details	Amy Baserga; Switzerland	24:15.6 (0+0+2+0)	Tereza Voborníková; Czech Republic	24:23.8 (0+0+0+0)	Maren Bakken; Norway	24:29.4 (1+1+1+0)
3 × 6 km Relay details	Norway; Maren Bakken; Marte Møller; Anne de Besche	57:19.2 (0+0) (0+2) (0+0) (0+1) (0+0) (0+0)	Germany; Lisa Maria Spark; Mareike Braun; Hanna-Michéle Herrmann	57:36.9 (0+0) (0+0) (0+0) (0+2) (0+1) (0+0)	France; Laura Boucaud; Coline Pasteur; Paula Botet	58:44.6 (0+1) (0+2) (0+0) (0+2) (0+0) (0+1)

== Medal table ==
Rank	Nation	Gold	Silver	Bronze	Total
1	Norway (NOR)	4	1	5	10
2	France (FRA)	2	2	2	6
3	Slovenia (SLO)	2	2	0	4
4	Switzerland (SUI)	2	1	0	3
5	Ukraine (UKR)	2	0	0	2
6	Germany (GER)	1	5	3	9
7	Russia (RUS)	1	1	0	2
8	China (CHN)	1	0	0	1
8	Greenland (GRL)	1	0	0	1
10	Czech Republic (CZE)	0	2	1	3
11	Belarus (BLR)	0	1	0	1
11	Poland (POL)	0	1	0	1
13	Finland (FIN)	0	0	2	2
13	Italy (ITA)	0	0	2	2
15	Sweden (SWE)	0	0	1	1
Totals (15 entries)		16	16	16	48
