= Endre Strømsheim =

Norwegian biathlete (born 1997)

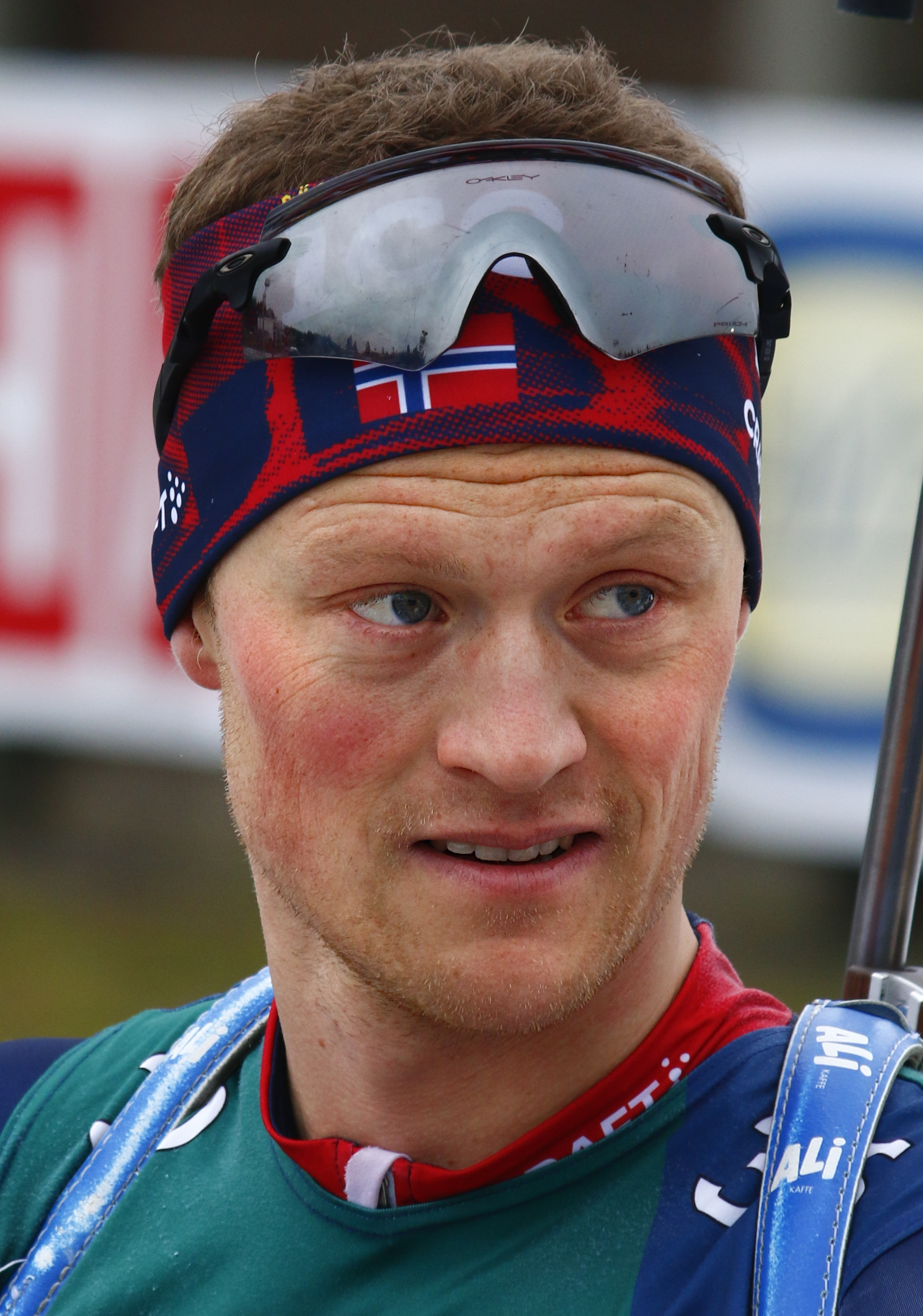
- Strømsheim in 2024

Personal information
- Nationality: Norwegian
- Born: 5 September 1997 (age 29) Oslo, Norway

Sport
- Country: Norway
- Sport: Biathlon

World Championships
- Teams: 3 (2023–2025)
- Medals: 2 (2 gold)

World Cup
- Seasons: 5 (2019, 2021, 2023–2025)
- Individual races: 64
- All races: 70
- Individual victories: 3
- All victories: 7
- Individual podiums: 6
- All podiums: 12
Medal record
Men's biathlon
Representing Norway
World Championships
Gold medal – first place	2025 Lenzerheide	15 km mass start
Gold medal – first place	2025 Lenzerheide	4 × 7.5 km relay
European Championships
Gold medal – first place	2020 Raubichi	Single mixed relay
Gold medal – first place	2023 Lenzerheide	20 km individual
Gold medal – first place	2023 Lenzerheide	Single mixed relay
Silver medal – second place	2021 Duszniki Zdroj	20 km individual
Bronze medal – third place	2019 Raubichi	20 km individual
Bronze medal – third place	2023 Lenzerheide	12.5 km pursuit
Junior World Championships
Silver medal – second place	2018 Otepää	4 × 7.5 km relay
Youth World Championships
Gold medal – first place	2016 Cheile Gradistei	3 × 7.5 km relay
Silver medal – second place	2016 Cheile Gradistei	7.5 km sprint
- Updated on 23 March 2025

Endre Solibakke Strømsheim (born 5 September 1997) is a Norwegian biathlete. He has competed in the Biathlon World Cup since 2019. He was the 2025 World Champion in the mass start. Strømsheim pulled out of the 2026 World Cup after Nove Mesto to better recover from injury. He later claimed this decision unfairly cost him a position on the Norwegian elite national team. Regardless of his team standing, he will have a wildcard position to the 2027 World Championships in Otepää as the defending Mass Start champion.

== Biathlon results ==
All results are sourced from the International Biathlon Union.

=== World Championships ===
2 medals (2 gold)

Event	Individual	Sprint	Pursuit	Mass start	Relay	Mixed relay	Single mixed relay
(Germany) 2023 Oberhof	15th	22nd	13th	15th	—	—	—
(Czech Republic) 2024 Nové Město	21st	20th	8th	—	—	—	—
(Switzerland) 2025 Lenzerheide	9th	7th	8th	Gold	Gold	—	—

=== World Cup ===
Season	Overall			Individual		Sprint		Pursuit		Mass start	
Season	Races	Points	Position	Points	Position	Points	Position	Points	Position	Points	Position
2018–19	1/25	Did not earn World Cup points									
2020–21	6/26	80	52nd	—	—	29	55th	51	37th	—	—
2022–23	6/21	141	36th	25	36th	50	36th	43	39th	23	37th
2023–24	21/21	700	7th	90	10th	224	13th	289	6th	97	17th
2024–25	19/21	562	13th	142	3rd	173	15th	97	23rd	150	10th
2025–26	4/21	3	103rd	—	—	—	—	3	83rd	—	—

==== Individual podiums ====
- 3 victories – (1 Pu, 1 MS, 1 Short Ind)
- 6 podiums

Season	Place	Competition	Placement
2023–24	Lenzerheide, Switzerland	Pursuit	2nd
2023–24	Oberhof, Germany	Sprint	3rd
2023–24	Oberhof, Germany	Pursuit	1st
2024–25	Kontiolahti, Finland	Short Individual	1st
2024–25	Oslo, Norway	Mass Start	3rd
2024–25	Lenzerheide, Switzerland	Mass Start	1st

==== Relay podiums ====
- 4 victories (4 Relays)
- 6 podiums

Season	Place	Competition	Placement
2022–23	Nové Město, Czech Republic	Mixed Relay	3rd
2022–23	Östersund, Sweden	Relay	1st
2023–24	Östersund, Sweden	Relay	1st
2023–24	Oberhof, Germany	Relay	1st
2024–25	Kontiolahti, Finland	Relay	2nd
2024–25	Lenzerheide, Switzerland	Relay	1st

=== Youth and Junior World Championships ===
3 medals (1 gold, 2 silver)

Year	Age	Individual	Sprint	Pursuit	Relay	Mixed relay
(Romania) 2016 Cheile Gradistei	18	7th	Silver	9th	Gold	—N/a
(Slovakia) 2017 Brezno-Osrblie	19	21st	41st	DNS	—N/a	—N/a
(Estonia) 2018 Otepää	20	42nd	34th	18th	Silver	—N/a
