= Biathlon at the Winter Youth Olympics =

- Governing body: IBU
- Events: 6 (men: 2; womens: 2; mixed: 2)

Games
- 2012; 2016; 2020; 2024

Biathlon is one of the sports featured at the Winter Youth Olympics. It has been part of the games since the inaugural edition in 2012.

== Medal summaries ==
=== Boys' events ===
==== Sprint (7.5 km) ====
| Games | Gold | Silver | Bronze |
|---|---|---|---|
| 2012 Innsbruck | Cheng Fangming; China | Rene Zahkna; Estonia | Aristide Begue; France |
| 2016 Lillehammer | Emilien Claude; France | Sivert Bakken; Norway | Egor Tutmin; Russia |
| 2020 Lausanne | Marcin Zawół; Poland | Denis Irodov; Russia | Vegard Thon; Norway |
| 2024 Gangwon | Antonin Guy; France | Tov Røysland; Norway | Flavio Guy; France |

==== Pursuit (10 km) ====
| Games | Gold | Silver | Bronze |
|---|---|---|---|
| 2012 Innsbruck | Niklas Homberg; Germany | Rene Zahkna; Estonia | Cheng Fangming; China |
| 2016 Lillehammer | Sivert Guttorm Bakken; Norway | Egor Tutmin; Russia | Said Karimulla Khalili; Russia |

==== Individual (12.5 km) ====
| Games | Gold | Silver | Bronze |
|---|---|---|---|
| 2020 Lausanne | Oleg Domichek; Russia | Lukas Haslinger; Austria | Mathieu Garcia; France |
| 2024 Gangwon | Antonin Guy; France | Storm Veitsle; Norway | Markus Sklenárik; Slovakia |

=== Girls' events ===
==== Sprint (6 km) ====
| Games | Gold | Silver | Bronze |
|---|---|---|---|
| 2012 Innsbruck | Franziska Preuß; Germany | Galina Vishnevskaya; Kazakhstan | Uliana Kaysheva; Russia |
| 2016 Lillehammer | Juliane Frühwirt; Germany | Marthe Kråkstad Johansen; Norway | Arina Pantova; Kazakhstan |
| 2020 Lausanne | Alena Mokhova; Russia | Anastasiia Zenova; Russia | Anna Andexer; Austria |
| 2024 Gangwon | Carlotta Gautero; Italy | Ela Sever; Slovenia | Polina Putsko; Ukraine |

==== Pursuit (7.5 km) ====
| Games | Gold | Silver | Bronze |
|---|---|---|---|
| 2012 Innsbruck | Uliana Kaysheva; Russia | Franziska Preuß; Germany | Galina Vishnevskaya; Kazakhstan |
| 2016 Lillehammer | Khrystyna Dmytrenko; Ukraine | Marthe Kråkstad Johansen; Norway | Lou Jeanmonnot-Laurent; France |

==== Individual (10 km) ====
| Games | Gold | Silver | Bronze |
|---|---|---|---|
| 2020 Lausanne | Alena Mokhova; Russia | Jeanne Richard; France | Yuliya Kavaleuskaya; Belarus |
| 2024 Gangwon | Ilona Plecháčová; Czech Republic | Marie Keudel; Germany | Nayeli Mariotti Cavagnet; Italy |

=== Mixed events ===
==== Mixed relay ====
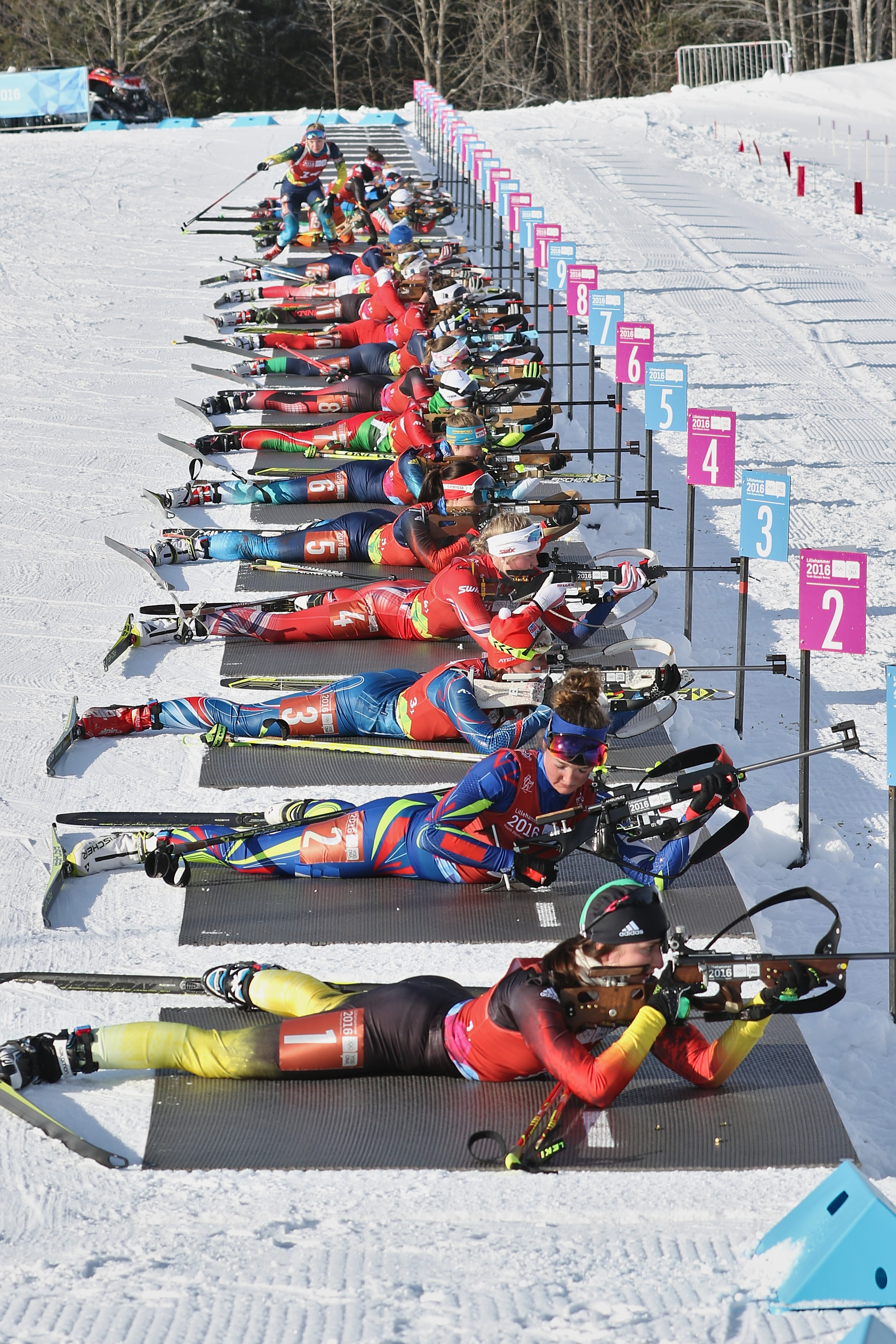
Biathlon mixed relay 2016

| Games | Gold | Silver | Bronze |
|---|---|---|---|
| 2012 Innsbruck | Germany; Franziska Preuß; Laura Hengelhaupt; Maximilian Janke; Niklas Homberg | Norway; Kristin Sandeggen; Karoline Næss; Haakon Livik; Kristian Andre Aalerud | France; Léa Ducordeau; Chloé Chevalier; Fabien Claude; Aristide Bègue |
| 2016 Lillehammer | Norway; Marit Øygard; Marthe Kråkstad Johansen; Fredrik Bucher-Johannessen; Sivert Bakken | Germany; Juliane Frühwirt; Franziska Pfnuer; Simon Gross; Danilo Riethmueller | Italy; Samuela Comola; Irene Lardschneider; Cedric Christille; Patrick Braunhofer |
| 2020 Lausanne | Italy; Martina Trabucchi; Linda Zingerle; Nicolò Betemps; Marco Barale | Russia; Alena Mokhova; Anastasiia Zenova; Denis Irodov; Oleg Domichek | France; Fany Bertrand; Léonie Jeannier; Théo Guiraud-Poillot; Mathieu Garcia |
| 2024 Gangwon | Italy; Nayeli Mariotti Cavagnet; Carlotta Gautero; Hannes Bacher; Michel Deval | France; Alice Dusserre; Louise Roguet; Flavio Guy; Antonin Guy | Czech Republic; Heda Mikolasova; Ilona Plecháčová; Jakub Neuhauser; Lukas Kulhanek |

==== Single mixed relay ====
| Games | Gold | Silver | Bronze |
|---|---|---|---|
| 2016 Lillehammer | China; Meng Fanqi; Zhu Zhenyu | Norway; Marthe Kråkstad Johansen; Fredrik Bucher-Johannessen | Russia; Ekaterina Ponedelko; Egor Tutmin |
| 2020 Lausanne | France; Jeanne Richard; Mathieu Garcia | Italy; Linda Zingerle; Marco Barale | Sweden; Sara Andersson; Oscar Andersson |
| 2024 Gangwon | France; Alice Dusserre; Antonin Guy | Germany; Marie Keudel; Korbinian Kübler | Norway; Eiril Nordbø; Storm Veitsle |

== Medal table ==
As of the 2024 Winter Youth Olympics.

| Rank | Nation | Gold | Silver | Bronze | Total |
|---|---|---|---|---|---|
| 1 | France | 5 | 2 | 6 | 13 |
| 2 | Russia | 4 | 4 | 4 | 12 |
| 3 | Germany | 4 | 4 | 0 | 8 |
| 4 | Italy | 3 | 1 | 2 | 6 |
| 5 | Norway | 2 | 7 | 2 | 11 |
| 6 | China | 2 | 0 | 1 | 3 |
| 7 | Czech Republic | 1 | 0 | 1 | 2 |
| 7 | Ukraine | 1 | 0 | 1 | 2 |
| 9 | Poland | 1 | 0 | 0 | 1 |
| 10 | Estonia | 0 | 2 | 0 | 2 |
| 11 | Kazakhstan | 0 | 1 | 2 | 3 |
| 12 | Austria | 0 | 1 | 1 | 2 |
| 13 | Slovenia | 0 | 1 | 0 | 1 |
| 14 | Belarus | 0 | 0 | 1 | 1 |
| 14 | Slovakia | 0 | 0 | 1 | 1 |
| 14 | Sweden | 0 | 0 | 1 | 1 |
| Totals (16 entries) | | 23 | 23 | 23 | 69 |

== See also ==
- Biathlon at the Winter Olympics
- Cross-country / Biathlon mixed relay at the 2012 Winter Youth Olympics
