= Biathlon World Championships 2025 – Women's individual =

Women's individual at the Biathlon World Championships 2025
- Venue: Roland Arena
- Location: Lenzerheide, Switzerland
- Dates: 18 February
- Competitors: 93 from 30 nations
- Winning time: 41:27.7

Medalists
gold medal	Julia Simon	France
silver medal	Ella Halvarsson	Sweden
bronze medal	Lou Jeanmonnot	France

The Women's individual competition at the Biathlon World Championships 2025 was held on 18 February 2025.

== Results ==
The race was started at 15:05.

Rank	Bib	Name	Nationality	Penalties (P+S+P+S)	Time	Deficit
1st place, gold medalist(s)	46	Julia Simon	France	1 (0+0+0+1)	41:27.7	
2nd place, silver medalist(s)	42	Ella Halvarsson	Sweden	0 (0+0+0+0)	42:05.5	+37.8
3rd place, bronze medalist(s)	52	Lou Jeanmonnot	France	1 (1+0+0+0)	42:06.9	+39.2
4	48	Suvi Minkkinen	Finland	0 (0+0+0+0)	42:43.0	+1:15.3
5	32	Yuliia Dzhima	Ukraine	0 (0+0+0+0)	42:51.5	+1:23.8
6	64	Elvira Öberg	Sweden	1 (0+0+0+1)	42:57.5	+1:29.8
7	37	Tuuli Tomingas	Estonia	1(0+0+0+1)	43:12.5	+1:44.8
8	44	Maren Kirkeeide	Norway	2 (1+0+0+1)	42:57.5	+1:46.7
9	62	Justine Braisaz-Bouchet	France	3 (0+0+2+1)	43:20.6	+1:52.9
10	56	Franziska Preuß	Germany	2 (0+0+0+2)	43:21.0	+1:53.3
11	49	Khrystyna Dmytrenko	Ukraine	0 (0+0+0+0)	43:39.4	+2:11.7
12	51	Ragnhild Femsteinevik	Norway	2 (0+1+0+1)	43:41.4	+2:13.7
13	55	Lora Hristova	Bulgaria	1 (1+0+0+0)	43:58.3	+2:30.6
14	40	Lotte Lie	Belgium	1 (0+0+1+0)	44:02.5	+2:34.8
15	33	Samuela Comola	Italy	1 (0+1+0+0)	44:05.7	+2:38.0
16	18	Lena Häcki-Groß	Switzerland	2 (1+0+1+0)	44:10.1	+2:42.4
17	27	Polona Klemenčič	Slovenia	1 (0+1+0+0)	44:15.5	+2:46.8
18	54	Océane Michelon	France	3 (0+2+1+0)	44:16.0	+2:48.3
19	36	Amy Baserga	Switzerland	2 (0+0+1+1)	44:18.8	+2:51.1
20	21	Aita Gasparin	Switzerland	2 (1+1+0+0)	44:33.4	+3:05.7
21	30	Hannah Auchentaller	Italy	2 (0+1+1+0)	44:41.6	+3:13.9
22	5	Johanna Puff	Germany	0 (0+0+0+0)	44:42.4	+3:14.7
23	60	Jeanne Richard	France	3 (1+0+0+2)	44:48.7	+3:21.0
24	38	Tereza Voborníková	Czech Republic	2 (1+0+0+1)	44:54.4	+3:26.7
25	45	Baiba Bendika	Latvia	4 (0+2+1+1)	44:58.2	+3:30.5
26	72	Natalia Sidorowicz	Poland	2 (1+0+0+1)	45:01.5	+3:33.8
27	57	Michela Carrara	Italy	4 (0+1+0+3)	45:03.0	+3:35.3
28	22	Anna Magnusson	Sweden	2 (1+0+0+1)	45:06.9	+3:39.2
29	3	Deedra Irwin	United States	2 (0+1+1+0)	45:19.9	+3:52.2
30	50	Lisa Theresa Hauser	Austria	3 (1+1+1+0)	45:29.8	+4:02.1
31	63	Tamara Steiner	Austria	1 (1+0+0+0)	45:33.0	+4:05.3
32	68	Lena Repinc	Slovenia	2 (2+0+0+0)	45:34.4	+4:06.7
33	34	Julia Tannheimer	Germany	4 (1+0+0+3)	45:34.4	+4:17.0
34	65	Ema Kapustová	Slovakia	1 (0+0+1+0)	45:48.8	+4:21.1
35	66	Ida Lien	Norway	4 (0+1+0+3)	45:52.1	+4:24.4
36	25	Jessica Jislová	Czech Republic	2 (0+0+1+1)	45:54.6	+4:26.9
37	26	Maya Cloetens	Belgium	2 (1+0+1+0)	45:56.1	+4:28.4
38	23	Anna Mąka	Poland	2 (1+0+0+1)	45:56.3	+4:28.6
39	12	Ingrid Landmark Tandrevold	Norway	3 (0+2+0+1)	45:59.0	+4:31.3
40	28	Paulína Bátovská Fialková	Slovakia	4 (1+1+0+2)	45:59.5	+4:31.8
41	31	Chloe Levins	United States	2 (0+1+1+0)	46:06.6	+4:38.9
42	84	Lucinda Anderson	United States	4 (0+2+1+1)	46:19.6	+4:51.9
43	24	Hanna Öberg	Sweden	5 (1+1+3+0)	46:28.8	+5:01.1
44	7	Anastasiya Merkushyna	Ukraine	2 (1+0+0+1)	46:35.9	+5:08.2
45	6	Lidija Žurauskaitė	Lithuania	3 (0+2+0+1)	46:45.8	+5:18.1
46	58	Selina Grotian	Germany	5 (2+1+1+1)	46:49.3	+5:21.6
47	43	Susan Külm	Estonia	3 (1+2+0+0)	46:52.6	+5:24.9
48	47	Alina Stremous	Moldova	2 (0+0+2+0)	46:54.8	+5:27.1
49	35	Judita Traubaitė	Lithuania	4 (1+0+2+1)	46:55.2	+5:27.5
50	13	Martina Trabucchi	Italy	3 (1+0+2+0)	46:56.2	+5:28.5
51	1	Anastasia Tolmacheva	Romania	0 (0+0+0+0)	46:57.7	+5:30.0
52	14	Anastasiya Kuzmina	Slovakia	5 (2+1+1+1)	47:14.4	+5:46.7
53	59	Sonja Leinamo	Finland	5 (0+2+1+2)	47:21.1	+5:53.4
54	29	Emma Lunder	Canada	4 (2+1+0+1)	47:23.6	+5:55.9
55	71	Joanna Jakieła	Poland	4 (1+1+0+2)	47:28.2	+6:00.5
56	9	Anna Andexer	Austria	4 (0+0+3+1)	47:36.3	+6:08.6
57	69	Johanna Talihärm	Estonia	3 (1+1+0+1)	47:38.2	+6:10.5
58	8	Sandra Buliņa	Latvia	2 (2+0+0+0)	47:42.5	+6:14.8
59	10	Kamila Żuk	Poland	4 (2+1+1+0)	47:43.1	+6:15.4
60	4	Regina Ermits	Estonia	4 (4+0+0+0)	47:45.7	+6:18.0
61	53	Olena Horodna	Ukraine	3 (1+1+1+0)	48:00.8	+6:33.1
62	2	Elisa Gasparin	Switzerland	5 (0+2+1+2)	48:07.8	+6:40.1
63	20	Milena Todorova	Bulgaria	6 (1+2+1+2)	48:33.0	+7:05.3
63	67	Lucie Charvátová	Czech Republic	6 (0+1+2+3)	48:33.0	+7:05.3
65	80	Gaia Brunello	Brazil	1 (0+1+0+0)	48:34.0	+7:06.3
66	74	Eve Bouvard	Belgium	4 (0+2+0+2)	48:36.0	+7:08.3
67	41	Anna Juppe	Austria	5 (2+1+0+2)	48:50.3	+7:22.6
68	73	Natalija Kočergina	Lithuania	4 (1+2+1+0)	49:02.3	+7:34.4
69	70	Pascale Paradis	Canada	4 (0+1+2+1)	49:04.0	+7:36.3
70	19	Inka Hämäläinen	Finland	5 (1+3+0+1)	49:04.6	+7:36.9
71	16	Anamarija Lampič	Slovenia	8 (3+2+1+2)	49:09.0	+7:41.3
72	90	Shawna Pendry	Great Britain	4 (0+1+2+1)	49:28.2	+8:00.5
73	17	Nadia Moser	Canada	5 (1+1+1+2)	49:48.2	+8:21.1
74	61	Aliona Makarova	Moldova	3 (1+1+1+0)	50:04.0	+8:36.3
75	79	Olga Poltoranina	Kazakhstan	4 (1+2+1+0)	50:14.7	+8:47.0
76	81	Elena Chirkova	Romania	4 (1+1+1+1)	50:22.3	+8:54.6
77	93	Grace Castonguay	United States	4 (1+0+2+1)	50:36.4	+9:08.7
78	86	Elza Bleidele	Latvia	5 (0+2+3+0)	50:41.4	+9:13.7
79	82	Živa Klemenčič	Slovenia	6 (1+2+1+2)	50:46.4	+9:18.7
80	11	Kristýna Otcovská	Czech Republic	6 (0+3+1+2)	50:57.3	+9:29.6
81	39	Darcie Morton	Australia	5 (2+1+1+1)	51:03.1	+9:35.4
82	77	Sara Ponya	Hungary	3 (1+0+1+1)	51:17.1	+9:49.4
83	75	Sanita Buliņa	Latvia	7 (2+1+0+4)	50:04.0	+9:55.5
84	83	Anika Kožica	Croatia	6 (0+3+0+3)	51:29.0	+10:01.3
85	87	Polina Yegorova	Kazakhstan	5 (1+1+1+2)	51:45.8	+10:18.1
86	85	Galina Vishnevskaya-Sheporenko	Kazakhstan	4 (1+1+1+1)	51:48.1	+10:20.4
87	92	Chloe Dupont	Great Britain	4 (2+1+0+1)	51:53.1	+10:25.4
88	91	Ukaleq Astri Slettemark	Greenland	3 (0+0+1+2)	51:55.2	+10:27.5
89	89	Konstantina Charalampidou	Greece	4 (2+0+0+2)	52:53.9	+11:26.2
90	76	Maria Zdravkova	Bulgaria	8 (2+2+4+0)	53:22.1	+11:54.4
91	78	Andreea Mezdrea	Romania	9 (2+2+2+3)	53:58.2	+12:30.5
	15	Erika Jänkä	Finland	(1+ )	Did not finish	
	88	Alla Ghilenko	Moldova	3 (0+0+1+2)	Did not finish	
