= Biathlon World Championships 2025 – Women's pursuit =

Women's pursuit at the Biathlon World Championships 2025
- Venue: Roland Arena
- Location: Lenzerheide, Switzerland
- Dates: 16 February
- Competitors: 60 from 21 nations
- Winning time: 26:58.9

Medalists
gold medal	Franziska Preuß	Germany
silver medal	Elvira Öberg	Sweden
bronze medal	Justine Braisaz-Bouchet	France

The Women's pursuit competition at the Biathlon World Championships 2025 was held on 16 February 2025.

== Results ==
The race was started at 12:05.

Rank	Bib	Name	Nationality	Start	Penalties (P+P+S+S)	Time	Deficit
1st place, gold medalist(s)	2	Franziska Preuß	Germany	0:10	0 (0+0+0+0)	26:58.9	
2nd place, silver medalist(s)	10	Elvira Öberg	Sweden	0:53	1 (0+0+0+1)	27:38.0	+39.1
3rd place, bronze medalist(s)	1	Justine Braisaz-Bouchet	France	0:00	3 (1+0+1+1)	27:39.8	+40.9
4	6	Lou Jeanmonnot	France	0:31	2 (0+0+1+1)	28:01.1	+1:02.2
5	4	Lena Häcki-Groß	Switzerland	0:11	4 (0+0+1+3)	28:27.2	+1:28.3
6	3	Suvi Minkkinen	Finland	0:10	2 (1+1+0+0)	28:40.0	+1:41.1
7	20	Anna Magnusson	Sweden	1:03	3 (0+0+1+2)	28:42.9	+1:44.0
8	5	Michela Carrara	Italy	0:24	5 (1+1+1+2)	28:43.1	+1:44.2
9	9	Ella Halvarsson	Sweden	0:52	4 (1+0+2+1)	28:46.8	+1:47.9
10	24	Selina Grotian	Germany	1:20	3 (1+2+0+0)	28:51.9	+1:53.0
11	19	Hanna Öberg	Sweden	1:03	5 (0+1+3+1)	29:01.6	+2:02.7
12	7	Julia Simon	France	0:35	6 (0+3+1+2)	29:06.5	+2:07.6
13	12	Océane Michelon	France	0:56	4 (1+1+0+2)	29:06.7	+2:07.8
14	29	Lotte Lie	Belgium	1:48	0 (0+0+0+0)	29:23.9	+2:25.0
15	26	Lisa Hauser	Austria	1:31	2 (0+0+0+2)	29:36.9	+2:38.0
16	14	Milena Todorova	Bulgaria	0:57	4 (1+0+1+2)	29:38.8	+2:39.9
17	8	Maya Cloetens	Belgium	0:50	1 (0+0+1+0)	29:43.1	+2:44.2
18	23	Ingrid Landmark Tandrevold	Norway	1:13	4 (0+0+1+3)	29:44.3	+2:45.4
19	40	Lora Hristova	Bulgaria	2:14	0 (0+0+0+0)	29:48.2	+2:49.3
20	32	Tuuli Tomingas	Estonia	1:50	1 (0+0+0+1)	29:50.6	+2:51.7
21	41	Aita Gasparin	Switzerland	2:15	2 (0+0+1+1)	29:51.9	+2:53.0
22	18	Yuliia Dzhima	Ukraine	1:00	3 (0+1+2+0)	30:01.3	+3:02.4
23	11	Sophia Schneider	Germany	0:56	5 (1+2+2+0)	30:01.4	+3:02.5
24	17	Julia Tannheimer	Germany	0:59	4 (1+0+1+2)	30:03.5	+3:04.6
25	51	Regina Ermits	Estonia	2:36	1 (0+1+0+0)	30:04.8	+3:05.9
26	27	Joanna Jakieła	Poland	1:36	2 (0+1+1+0)	30:09.8	+3:10.9
27	25	Emma Lunder	Canada	1:27	3 (0+1+2+0)	30:14.2	+3:15.3
28	15	Anamarija Lampič	Slovenia	0:57	8 (1+1+2+4)	30:14.9	+3:16.0
29	22	Paulína Bátovská Fialková	Slovakia	1:13	5 (2+1+1+1)	30:15.2	+3:16.3
30	48	Khrystyna Dmytrenko	Ukraine	2:28	1 (1+0+0+0)	30:15.6	+3:16.7
31	35	Tamara Steiner	Austria	2:04	1 (0+0+0+1)	30:19.3	+3:20.4
32	33	Anastasiya Kuzmina	Slovakia	1:50	4 (0+1+1+2)	30:34.6	+3:35.7
33	16	Maren Kirkeeide	Norway	0:57	7 (2+3+1+1)	30:37.5	+3:38.6
34	28	Jeanne Richard	France	1:38	5 (1+1+2+1)	30:51.0	+3:52.1
35	31	Nadia Moser	Canada	1:50	3 (0+1+1+1)	30:53.7	+3:54.8
36	54	Jessica Jislová	Czech Republic	2:43	1 (0+0+1+0)	31:02.8	+4:03.9
37	30	Polona Klemenčič	Slovenia	1:48	4 (1+0+1+2)	31:03.5	+4:04.6
38	37	Elisa Gasparin	Switzerland	2:08	4 (1+0+1+2)	31:05.0	+4:06.1
39	36	Susan Külm	Estonia	2:05	4 (1+1+1+1)	31:11.0	+4:12.1
40	46	Hannah Auchentaller	Italy	2:28	3 (1+0+1+1)	31:14.3	+4:15.4
41	55	Baiba Bendika	Latvia	2:45	5 (0+0+4+1)	31:24.5	+4:25.6
42	59	Anastasia Tolmacheva	Romania	2:48	0 (0+0+0+0)	31:32.2	+4:33.3
43	38	Pascale Paradis	Canada	2:13	0 (0+0+0+0)	31:34.1	+4:35.2
44	58	Anna Andexer	Austria	2:48	3 (1+1+1+0)	31:36.3	+4:37.4
45	50	Ragnhild Femsteinevik	Norway	2:33	5 (4+1+0+0)	31:54.2	+4:55.3
46	43	Valentina Dimitrova	Bulgaria	2:21	4 (1+0+2+1)	32:07.8	+5:08.9
47	45	Anna Mąka	Poland	2:27	3 (0+1+1+1)	32:08.4	+5:09.5
48	52	Chloe Levins	United States	2:40	3 (1+0+1+1)	32:26.9	+5:28.0
49	56	Lucinda Anderson	United States	2:46	5 (1+2+0+2)	32:32.3	+5:33.4
50	39	Lucie Charvátová	Czech Republic	2:14	8 (2+1+2+3)	32:35.8	+5:36.9
51	44	Karoline Offigstad Knotten	Norway	2:21	6 (2+1+2+1)	32:58.8	+5:59.9
52	57	Eve Bouvard	Belgium	2:47	5 (1+2+1+1)	33:10.3	+6:11.4
53	60	Lena Repinc	Slovenia	2:50	7 (0+2+2+3)	33:10.9	+6:12.0
54	47	Judita Traubaite	Lithuania	2:28	7 (1+2+2+2)	33:15.7	+6:16.8
55	13	Natalia Sidorowicz	Poland	0:57	7 (1+2+3+1)	33:27.9	+6:29.0
56	42	Estere Volfa	Latvia	2:16	8 (2+1+3+2)	33:53.7	+6:54.8
–	21	Dorothea Wierer	Italy	1:11	Did not start		
–	34	Anna Gandler	Austria	1:50	Did not start		
–	49	Johanna Talihärm	Estonia	2:33	Lapped		
–	53	Martina Trabucchi	Italy	2:42	Lapped		
