= Biathlon World Championships 2024 – Women's sprint =

Women's sprint at the Biathlon World Championships 2024
- Venue: Vysočina Arena
- Location: Nové Město na Moravě, Czech Republic
- Dates: 9 February
- Competitors: 93 from 29 nations
- Winning time: 20:07.5

Medalists
gold medal	Julia Simon	France
silver medal	Justine Braisaz-Bouchet	France
bronze medal	Lou Jeanmonnot	France

The Women's sprint competition at the Biathlon World Championships 2024 was held on 9 February 2024.

Denise Herrmann-Wick was the defending champion, but she has already ended her career in the 2022–23 season.

Julia Simon became the new world champion and only the fourth Frenchwoman to secure the world championship title in sprint, following in the footsteps of Anne Briand (1995), Sylvie Becaert (2003) and Marie Dorin Habert (2015). Justine Braisaz-Bouchet from France took silver and the bronze was won by Lou Jeanmonnot from France, who had won her first ever world championship medal.

For the first time since the first women's World Championships in biathlon in 1984, the first four places in the competition were taken by representatives of the same country.

== Results ==
The race was started at 17:20.

Rank	Bib	Name	Nationality	Penalties (P+S)	Time	Deficit
1st place, gold medalist(s)	2	Julia Simon	France	0 (0+0)	20:07.5	
2nd place, silver medalist(s)	21	Justine Braisaz-Bouchet	France	1 (1+0)	20:12.4	+4.9
3rd place, bronze medalist(s)	5	Lou Jeanmonnot	France	1 (0+1)	20:48.3	+40.8
4	40	Sophie Chauveau	France	1 (1+0)	20:51.7	+44.2
5	44	Baiba Bendika	Latvia	1 (0+1)	20:54.0	+46.5
6	19	Franziska Preuß	Germany	1 (0+1)	21:12.8	+1:05.3
7	23	Lisa Vittozzi	Italy	0 (0+0)	21:13.8	+1:06.3
8	6	Hanna Öberg	Sweden	1 (0+1)	21:14.3	+1:06.8
9	11	Elvira Öberg	Sweden	1 (0+1)	21:16.7	+1:09.2
10	16	Dorothea Wierer	Italy	0 (0+0)	21:26.4	+1:18.9
11	4	Anna Gandler	Austria	1 (0+1)	21:26.8	+1:19.3
12	59	Khrystyna Dmytrenko	Ukraine	0 (0+0)	21:33.7	+1:26.2
13	76	Tamara Steiner	Austria	0 (0+0)	21:43.5	+1:36.0
14	28	Juni Arnekleiv	Norway	1 (1+0)	21:43.6	+1:36.1
15	78	Jeanne Richard	France	2 (0+2)	21:44.5	+1:37.0
16	73	Natalia Sidorowicz	Poland	0 (0+0)	21:47.3	+1:39.8
17	24	Markéta Davidová	Czech Republic	2 (0+2)	21:49.0	+1:41.5
18	17	Vanessa Voigt	Germany	1 (0+1)	21:50.0	+1:42.5
19	46	Iryna Petrenko	Ukraine	0 (0+0)	21:51.6	+1:44.1
20	32	Anna Magnusson	Sweden	2 (1+1)	21:52.2	+1:48.3
21	3	Yuliia Dzhima	Ukraine	1 (0+1)	21:55.8	+1:50.2
22	30	Ida Lien	Norway	3 (0+3)	21:57.7	+1:52.9
23	57	Joanna Jakieła	Poland	1 (0+1)	22:00.4	+1:56.3
24	1	Tuuli Tomingas	Estonia	2 (0+2)	22:03.8	+1:56.6
25	26	Ingrid Landmark Tandrevold	Norway	3 (0+3)	22:04.1	+1:56.6
25	68	Regina Ermits	Estonia	2 (2+0)	22:04.1	+1:59.3
27	12	Lotte Lie	Belgium	1 (1+0)	22:06.8	+2:04.4
28	52	Sophia Schneider	Germany	2 (1+1)	22:11.9	+2:05.6
29	84	Anastasiya Merkushyna	Ukraine	1 (0+1)	22:13.1	+2:09.1
30	54	Daria Virolainen	Finland	1 (0+1)	22:16.6	+2:09.1
30	79	Lena Repinc	Slovenia	0 (0+0)	22:16.6	+2:09.1
32	55	Tereza Voborníková	Czech Republic	2 (2+0)	22:17.4	+2:09.9
33	8	Karoline Offigstad Knotten	Norway	2 (0+2)	22:20.3	+2:12.8
34	43	Lisa Theresa Hauser	Austria	1 (0+1)	22:22.1	+2:14.6
35	9	Janina Hettich-Walz	Germany	3 (0+3)	22:22.3	+2:14.8
36	10	Anamarija Lampič	Slovenia	5 (2+3)	22:26.8	+2:19.3
37	62	Samuela Comola	Italy	1 (0+1)	22:27.2	+2:19.7
38	15	Mona Brorsson	Sweden	2 (1+1)	22:29.8	+2:22.3
39	18	Deedra Irwin	United States	2 (1+1)	22:32.1	+2:24.6
40	87	Lucie Charvátová	Czech Republic	3 (1+2)	22:34.3	+2:26.8
41	37	Susan Külm	Estonia	2 (0+2)	22:34.9	+2:27.4
42	33	Ekaterina Avvakumova	South Korea	1 (0+1)	22:35.7	+2:28.2
43	77	Galina Vishnevskaya-Sheporenko	Kazakhstan	0 (0+0)	22:36.7	+2:29.2
44	50	Polona Klemenčič	Slovenia	2 (0+2)	22:39.0	+2:31.5
45	35	Michela Carrara	Italy	4 (1+3)	22:39.4	+2:31.9
46	14	Anna Mąka	Poland	1 (1+0)	22:39.7	+2:32.2
47	22	Suvi Minkkinen	Finland	2 (0+2)	22:45.0	+2:37.5
48	66	Jessica Jislová	Czech Republic	2 (0+2)	22:45.7	+2:38.2
49	63	Eve Bouvard	Belgium	1 (0+1)	22:49.2	+2:41.7
49	80	Elisa Gasparin	Switzerland	1 (0+1)	22:49.2	+2:41.7
51	93	Anna Juppe	Austria	3 (1+2)	22:55.0	+2:47.5
52	89	Venla Lehtonen	Finland	1 (1+0)	22:56.8	+2:49.3
53	20	Nadia Moser	Canada	2 (1+1)	22:58.5	+2:51.0
54	27	Amy Baserga	Switzerland	3 (2+1)	23:00.3	+2:52.8
55	36	Maya Cloetens	Belgium	2 (0+2)	23:00.8	+2:53.3
55	65	Natalja Kočergina	Lithuania	2 (1+1)	23:00.8	+2:53.3
57	91	Emily Dickson	Canada	0 (0+0)	23:03.6	+2:56.1
58	92	Tara Geraghty-Moats	United States	1 (0+1)	23:05.2	+2:57.7
59	71	Noora Kaisa Keranen	Finland	0 (0+0)	23:06.5	+2:59.0
60	58	Lidiia Zhurauskaite	Lithuania	3 (2+1)	23:09.6	+3:02.1
61	51	Anastasiya Kuzmina	Slovakia	2 (1+1)	23:10.2	+3:02.7
62	48	Aita Gasparin	Switzerland	2 (1+1)	23:14.5	+3:07.0
63	81	Johanna Talihärm	Estonia	2 (2+0)	23:27.1	+3:19.6
64	60	Zuzana Remeňová	Slovakia	2 (1+1)	23:27.3	+3:19.8
65	47	Lora Hristova	Bulgaria	3 (0+3)	23:35.1	+3:27.6
66	13	Lena Häcki	Switzerland	5 (1+4)	23:36.6	+3:29.1
67	64	Benita Peiffer	Canada	2 (0+2)	23:38.7	+3:31.2
68	48	Mária Remeňová	Slovakia	2 (2+0)	23:39.1	+3:31.6
69	81	Emma Lunder	Canada	3 (2+1)	23:42.7	+3:35.2
70	60	Andreea Mezdrea	Romania	1 (1+0)	23:45.0	+3:37.5
71	47	Darcie Morton	Australia	3 (2+1)	23:47.8	+3:40.3
72	13	Alla Ghilenko	Moldova	3 (1+2)	23:51.7	+3:44.2
73	64	Anika Kozica	Croatia	2 (1+1)	23:54.3	+3:46.8
74	48	Judita Traubaite	Lithuania	3 (1+2)	23:54.4	+3:46.9
75	81	Anastasia Tolmacheva	Romania	3 (2+1)	23:56.3	+3:48.8
76	60	Valentina Dimitrova	Bulgaria	3 (3+0)	23:58.4	+3:50.9
77	47	Ukaleq Astri Slettemark	Greenland	1 (1+0)	24:03.3	+3:55.8
78	13	Alina Skripkina	Kazakhstan	1 (0+1)	23:09.3	+4:01.8
79	64	Annija Sabule	Latvia	1 (0+1)	24:15.2	+4:07.7
80	67	Elena Chirkova	Romania	2 (1+1)	24:31.9	+4:24.4
80	69	Chloe Levins	United States	2 (1+1)	24:31.9	+4:24.4
82	41	Polina Yegorova	Kazakhstan	4 (2+2)	24:33.1	+4:25.6
83	61	Aliona Makarova	Moldova	3 (1+2)	24:39.4	+4:31.9
84	85	Daria Gembicka	Poland	4 (1+3)	24:57.1	+4:49.6
85	72	Sandra Buliņa	Latvia	5 (2+3)	25:14.6	+5:07.1
86	49	Aoi Sato	Japan	4 (3+1)	25:17.7	+5:10.2
87	29	Jackie Garso	United States	3 (0+3)	25:20.9	+5:13.4
88	74	Maria Zdravkova	Bulgaria	3 (1+2)	25:26.3	+5:18.8
89	83	Júlia Machyniaková	Slovakia	4 (1+3)	25:27.8	+5:20.3
90	88	Choi Yoo-nah	South Korea	2 (1+1)	25:28.1	+5:20.6
91	56	Konstantina Charalampidou	Greece	1 (1+0)	25:28.5	+5:21.0
92	75	Ko Eun-jung	South Korea	2 (1+1)	25:31.7	+5:24.2
93	70	Hikaru Fukuda	Japan	4 (1+3)	25:54.2	+5:46.7
