= Biathlon at the 2020 Winter Youth Olympics – Mixed relay =

Mixed relay at the III Winter Youth Olympic Games
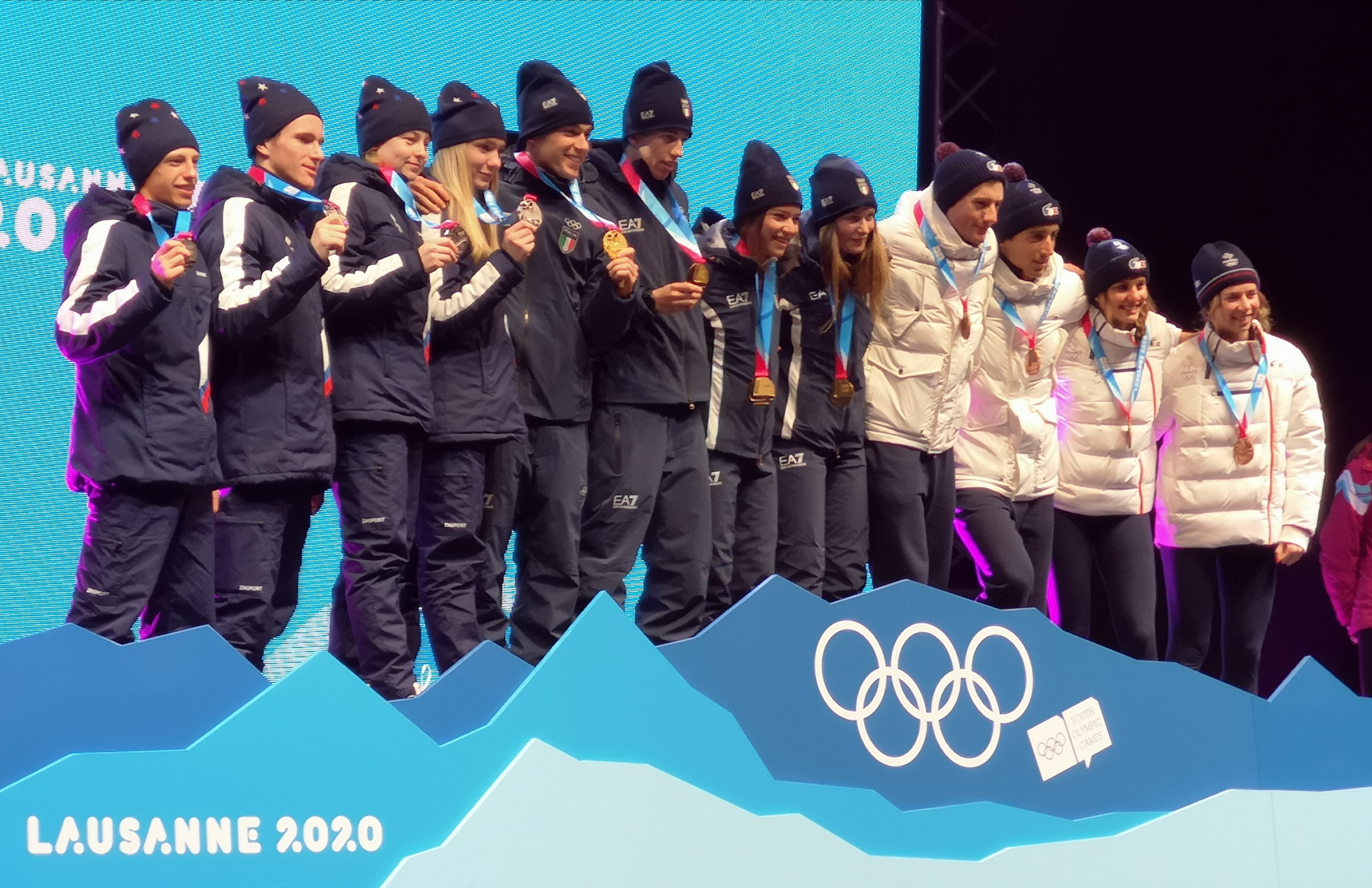
- Venue: Les Tuffes Nordic Centre
- Date: 15 January
- Competitors: 100 from 25 nations
- Winning time: 1:10:55.3

Medalists
1st place, gold medalist(s)		Martina Trabucchi; Linda Zingerle; Nicolò Betemps; Marco Barale	Italy
2nd place, silver medalist(s)		Alena Mokhova; Anastasiia Zenova; Denis Irodov; Oleg Domichek	Russia
3rd place, bronze medalist(s)		Fany Bertrand; Léonie Jeannier; Théo Guiraud-Poillot; Mathieu Garcia	France

The mixed relay biathlon competition at the 2020 Winter Youth Olympics was held on 15 January at the Les Tuffes Nordic Centre.

== Results ==
The race was started at 10:30.

Rank	Bib	Country	Time	Penalties (P+S)	Deficit
1st place, gold medalist(s)	3	Italy; Martina Trabucchi; Linda Zingerle; Nicolò Betemps; Marco Barale	1:10:55.3; 18:41.1; 18:31.4; 16:54.1; 16:48.5	0+4 0+2; 0+0 0+0; 0+3 0+1; 0+1 0+1; 0+0 0+0	
2nd place, silver medalist(s)	5	Russia; Alena Mokhova; Anastasiia Zenova; Denis Irodov; Oleg Domichek	1:11:39.0; 18:25.2; 18:48.0; 16:28.1; 17:57.5	0+5 1+7; 0+2 0+1; 0+1 0+0; 0+0 0+3; 0+2 1+3	+43.7
3rd place, bronze medalist(s)	4	France; Fany Bertrand; Léonie Jeannier; Théo Guiraud-Poillot; Mathieu Garcia	1:12:23.9; 19:19.2; 19:30.0; 17:08.6; 16:26.0	1+5 0+8; 1+3 0+2; 0+2 0+3; 0+0 0+3; 0+0 0+0	+1:28.6
4	9	Czech Republic; Gabriela Masaříková; Zuzana Doležalová; Luděk Abrahám; Jakub Kudrnáč	1:12:57.9; 19:04.8; 19:19.4; 17:18.5; 17:15.0	1+9 1+6; 0+3 0+2; 0+2 0+0; 1+3 1+3; 0+1 0+1	+2:02.6
5	1	Norway; Gro Njølstad Randby; Gunn Kristi Stensaker Tvinnereim; Stian Fedreheim; Vegard Thon	1:13:20.6; 18:37.8; 19:25.8; 17:03.1; 18:13.9	0+6 2+10; 0+1 0+3; 0+2 0+1; 0+3 0+3; 0+0 2+3	+2:25.3
6	15	Poland; Klaudia Topór; Justyna Panterałka; Jan Guńka; Marcin Zawół	1:13:32.4; 19:35.0; 20:51.4; 16:11.9; 16:54.0	0+4 0+9; 0+2 0+3; 0+1 0+2; 0+0 0+3; 0+1 0+1	+2:37.1
7	2	Germany; Johanna Puff; Marlene Fichtner; Franz Schaser; Elias Asal	1:14:43.9; 19:00.0; 19:25.6; 19:17.0; 17:01.1	4+7 0+3; 0+3 0+1; 0+0 0+0; 4+3 0+0; 0+1 0+2	+3:48.6
8	6	Ukraine; Hanna Skrypko; Tetiana Prodan; Stepan Kinash; Vitalii Mandzyn	1:14:46.8; 20:12.2; 20:21.4; 16:46.5; 17:26.6	0+4 0+6; 0+1 0+1; 0+1 0+2; 0+0 0+0; 0+2 0+3	+3:51.5
9	22	Kazakhstan; Ulyana Ardalionova; Vlada Vassillchenko; Danil Chervenko; Vadim Kurales	1:15:42.3; 20:08.3; 21:06.8; 17:28.3; 16:58.7	0+6 1+8; 0+2 0+1; 0+2 1+3; 0+1 0+2; 0+1 0+2	+4:47.0
10	14	Austria; Anna Andexer; Lara Wagner; Lukas Haslinger; Lukas Weissbacher	1:16:11.1; 20:58.9; 19:52.9; 17:03.1; 18:16.1	2+9 2+9; 1+3 2+3; 0+2 0+3; 0+1 0+1; 1+3 0+2	+5:15.8
11	23	Slovenia; Kaja Zorč; Kaja Marič; Drejc Trojer; Mark Vozelj	1:16:36.7; 19:23.4; 20:15.9; 18:26.3; 18:31.0	0+6 3+10; 0+1 0+2; 0+1 2+3; 0+2 0+2; 0+2 1+3	+5:41.4
12	21	Finland; Anni Hyvärinen; Olivia Halme; Ville-Valtteri Karvinen; Kalle Loukkaanhuhta	1:17:29.7; 19:34.0; 20:01.0; 17:36.8; 20:17.8	2+4 1+9; 0+0 0+1; 0+0 0+2; 0+1 0+3; 2+3 1+3	+6:34.4
13	8	Switzerland; Yara Burkhalter; Marlène Perren; Yanis Keller; Felix Ullmann	1:17:43.1; 19:32.2; 20:24.0; 17:02.1; 20:44.5	2+7 3+5; 0+1 0+1; 1+3 0+0; 0+1 0+1; 1+2 3+3	+6:47.8
14	13	Bulgaria; Valentina Dimitrova; Lora Hristova; Krasimir Atanasov; Vasil Zashev	1:18:17.2; 18:30.2; 20:25.1; 19:55.3; 19:26.4	1+6 1+6; 0+0 0+0; 0+2 0+2; 0+1 1+3; 1+3 0+1	+7:21.9
15	11	Sweden; Wilma Björn; Klara Andersson; Fabian Hermansson; Oscar Andersson	1:19:01.1; 20:53.7; 22:40.4; 18:04.3; 17:22.5	0+3 3+11; 0+2 0+2; 0+1 1+3; 0+0 1+3; 0+0 1+3	+8:05.8
16	17	Estonia; Demi Heinsoo; Lisbeth Liiv; Tuudor Palm; Andreas Koppa	1:19:25.2; 20:21.2; 22:01.1; 17:25.1; 19:37.6	1+12 5+11; 0+3 1+3; 1+3 3+3; 0+3 0+2; 0+3 1+3	+8:29.9
17	12	Belarus; Darya Kabishava; Viktoryia Shashkova; Kanstantsin Baburau; Andrei Haurosh	1:19:25.3; 20:56.3; 21:12.2; 19:45.7; 17:30.9	3+7 1+8; 0+1 0+2; 2+3 0+3; 1+3 1+3; 0+0 0+0	+8:30.0
18	16	Canada; Jenna Sherrington; Naomi Walch; Finn Berg; Ethan Algra	1:20:47.1; 21:43.2; 21:25.6; 18:47.1; 18:51.0	4+8 1+9; 3+3 0+2; 1+3 0+2; 0+1 0+2; 0+1 1+3	+9:51.8
19	7	United States; Kaisa Bosek; Margaret Madigan; Etienne Bordes; Cale Woods	1:21:20.9; 20:25.6; 22:07.9; 18:38.8; 20:08.5	0+6 3+9; 0+2 0+0; 0+1 0+3; 0+2 1+3; 0+1 2+3	+10:25.6
20	18	Latvia; Signe Miķelsone; Līva Šahno; Imants Maļina; Aleksandrs Kuzņecovs	1:22:06.8; 23:04.2; 21:13.9; 18:18.6; 19:30.0	0+3 4+8; 0+1 3+3; 0+1 0+1; 0+0 0+1; 0+1 1+3	+11:11.5
21	10	Slovakia; Ema Kapustová; Sára Pacerová; Matej Gregor; Bruno Matovič	1:22:50.1; 19:52.7; 22:01.3; 20:35.0; 20:21.0	1+8 5+11; 0+2 1+3; 0+1 1+3; 1+3 3+3; 0+2 0+2	+11:54.8
22	25	Romania; Andrea Csutak; Blanka Borbély; Zalán Kovács; Nicolae Gîrbacea	1:27:14.9; 21:44.4; 25:12.6; 20:15.6; 20:02.1	5+11 3+9; 0+2 0+2; 1+3 2+3; 3+3 0+1; 1+3 1+3	+16:19.6
23	24	Australia; Isabella Moon; Chelsey Johnson; Christian Mahon; David Patterson	1:27:21.3; 22:11.5; 22:56.2; 20:22.9; 21:50.6	0+3 2+8; 0+1 2+3; 0+1 0+0; 0+0 0+2; 0+1 0+3	+16:26.0
24	20	Japan; Misa Sasaki; Kurea Matsuoka; Chiharu Ueda; Taiki Ito	1:33:11.3; 23:03.6; 29:42.2; 19:48.7; 20:36.6	7+10 7+11; 1+3 2+3; 4+2 3+3; 0+2 2+3; 2+3 0+2	+22:16.0
	19	Lithuania; Viktorija Augulytė; Kamilė Jakubauskaitė; Darius Dinda; Domas Jankauskas	Disqualified		
