= Biathlon at the 2020 Winter Youth Olympics – Single mixed relay =

Single mixed relay at the III Winter Youth Olympic Games
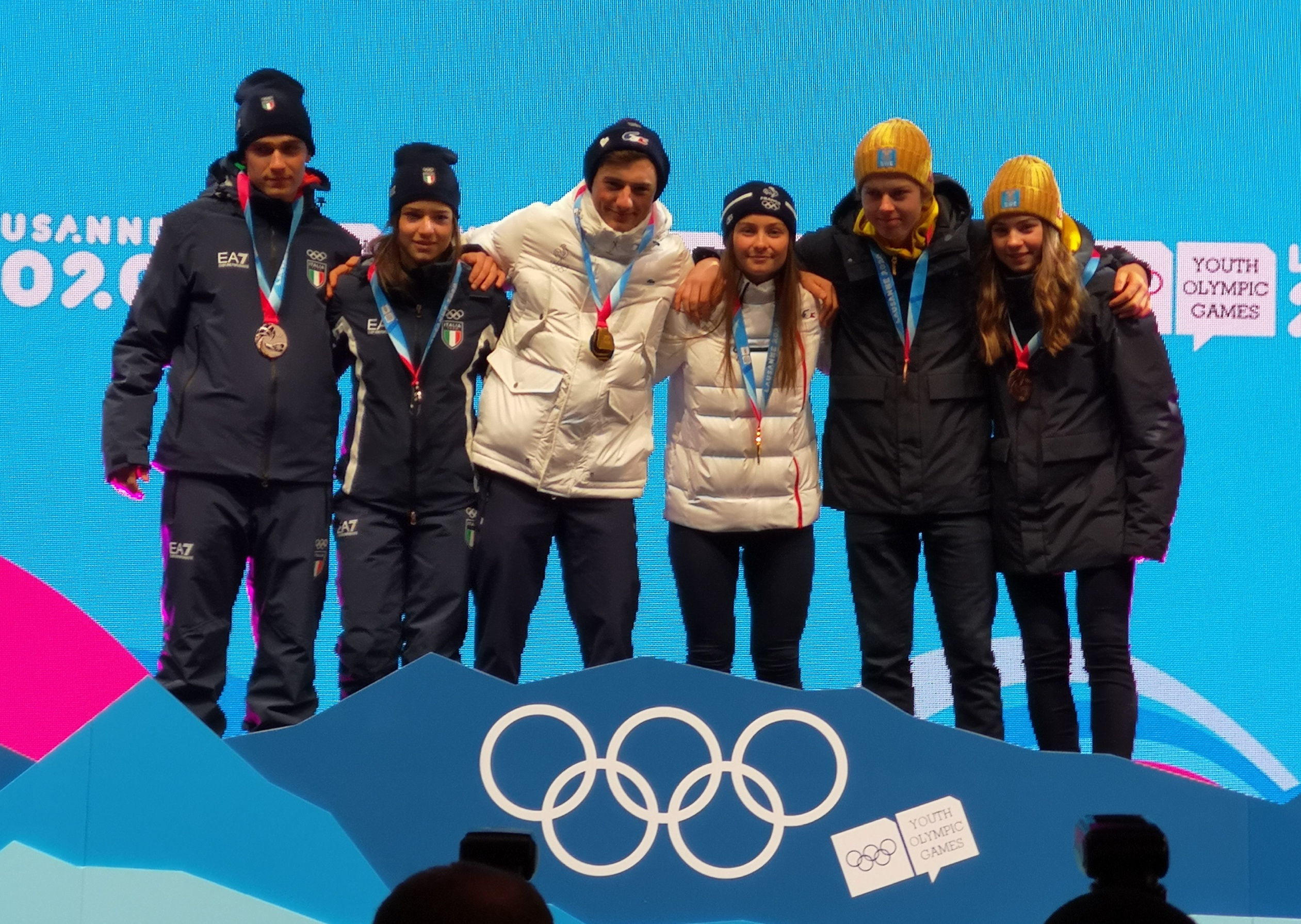
- Venue: Les Tuffes Nordic Centre
- Date: 12 January
- Competitors: 60 from 30 nations
- Winning time: 42:03.5

Medalists
1st place, gold medalist(s)		Jeanne Richard; Mathieu Garcia	France
2nd place, silver medalist(s)		Linda Zingerle; Marco Barale	Italy
3rd place, bronze medalist(s)		Sara Andersson; Oscar Andersson	Sweden

The single mixed relay biathlon competition at the 2020 Winter Youth Olympics was held on 12 January at the Les Tuffes Nordic Centre.

== Results ==
The race was started at 10:30.

Rank	Bib	Country	Time	Penalties (P+S)	Deficit
1st place, gold medalist(s)	4	France; Jeanne Richard; Mathieu Garcia; Jeanne Richard; Mathieu Garcia	42:03.5; 9:59.5; 9:11.3; 9:58.3; 12:54.2	0+5 0+2; 0+2 0+0; 0+2 0+0; 0+0 0+1; 0+1 0+1	
2nd place, silver medalist(s)	11	Italy; Linda Zingerle; Marco Barale; Linda Zingerle; Marco Barale	42:23.0; 10:11.2; 9:13.1; 10:06.0; 12:52.5	0+6 2+10; 0+2 0+2; 0+1 1+3; 0+0 1+3; 0+3 0+2	+19.5
3rd place, bronze medalist(s)	8	Sweden; Sara Andersson; Oscar Andersson; Sara Andersson; Oscar Andersson	42:30.3; 10:14.6; 8:40.8; 10:17.3; 13:17.4	1+5 1+7; 0+1 0+1; 0+1 0+2; 0+0 0+1; 1+3 1+3	+26.8
4	7	Switzerland; Yara Burkhalter; Yanis Keller; Yara Burkhalter; Yanis Keller	42:43.7; 9:59.8; 8:52.8; 10:42.7; 13:08.3	0+5 1+5; 0+0 0+1; 0+2 0+0; 0+2 0+1; 0+1 1+3	+40.2
5	12	Czech Republic; Kateřina Pavlů; Jakub Kudrnáč; Kateřina Pavlů; Jakub Kudrnáč	42:52.9; 10:15.8; 8:43.0; 10:17.6; 13:36.4	1+4 1+5; 0+0 0+1; 0+1 0+0; 0+0 0+1; 1+3 1+3	+49.4
6	9	Ukraine; Hanna Skrypko; Stepan Kinash; Hanna Skrypko; Stepan Kinash	43:06.8; 10:49.8; 8:46.7; 10:28.5; 13:01.6	0+1 0+7; 0+1 0+3; 0+0 0+0; 0+0 0+1; 0+0 0+3	+1:03.3
7	3	Russia; Alena Mokhova; Oleg Domichek; Alena Mokhova; Oleg Domichek	43:13.3; 10:44.1; 8:58.0; 10:55.0; 12:36.2	1+5 2+9; 0+1 2+3; 0+1 0+1; 1+3 0+3; 0+0 0+2	+1:09.8
8	17	Kazakhstan; Ulyana Ardalionova; Vadim Kurales; Ulyana Ardalionova; Vadim Kurales	43:45.0; 10:48.9; 8:59.1; 10:48.0; 13:08.8	1+9 0+5; 0+1 0+2; 0+3 0+0; 0+2 0+1; 1+3 0+2	+1:41.5
9	5	Germany; Johanna Puff; Elias Asal; Johanna Puff; Elias Asal	43:47.7; 10:13.9; 9:49.0; 10:20.5; 13:24.1	1+9 1+6; 0+2 0+1; 1+3 0+0; 0+3 0+2; 0+1 1+3	+1:44.2
10	2	Norway; Gunn Kristi Stensaker Tvinnereim; Stian Fedreheim; Gunn Kristi Stensaker Tvinnereim; Stian Fedreheim	43:59.9; 11:10.8; 9:22.1; 10:27.3; 12:59.7	1+9 0+9; 1+3 0+3; 0+3 0+3; 0+1 0+1; 0+2 0+2	+1:56.4
11	13	Canada; Pascale Paradis; Ethan Algra; Pascale Paradis; Ethan Algra	44:10.7; 10:00.9; 9:55.9; 9:55.6; 14:18.1	0+4 0+6; 0+1 0+1; 0+1 0+2; 0+1 0+0; 0+1 0+3	+2:07.2
12	14	Belarus; Yuliya Kavaleuskaya; Andrei Haurosh; Yuliya Kavaleuskaya; Andrei Haurosh	44:33.9; 10:57.8; 9:18.5; 10:51.6; 13:25.8	0+6 2+8; 0+2 1+3; 0+0 0+2; 0+3 1+3; 0+1 0+0	+2:30.4
13	20	Poland; Anna Nędza-Kubiniec; Marcin Zawół; Anna Nędza-Kubiniec; Marcin Zawół	44:42.8; 11:53.1; 9:12.9; 10:57.9; 12:38.7	2+6 0+7; 2+3 0+3; 0+0 0+2; 0+2 0+2; 0+1 0+0	+2:39.3
14	21	Estonia; Demi Heinsoo; Markus Rene Epner; Demi Heinsoo; Markus Rene Epner	45:07.7; 10:24.7; 9:13.1; 11:59.3; 13:30.5	1+9 3+9; 0+2 0+0; 0+1 0+3; 1+3 3+3; 0+3 0+3	+3:04.2
15	18	Bulgaria; Valentina Dimitrova; Vasil Zashev; Valentina Dimitrova; Vasil Zashev	45:29.7; 10:50.6; 10:10.3; 10:31.0; 13:57.7	1+9 2+10; 0+2 0+2; 0+3 2+3; 0+1 0+3; 1+3 0+2	+3:26.2
16	19	Austria; Lara Wagner; Lukas Haslinger; Lara Wagner; Lukas Haslinger	46:07.0; 11:03.7; 10:26.4; 11:04.8; 13:31.9	0+6 4+11; 0+1 2+3; 0+1 2+3; 0+2 0+3; 0+2 0+2	+4:03.5
17	1	China; Ding Yuhuan; Guo Zhendong; Ding Yuhuan; Guo Zhendong	46:10.7; 10:04.7; 9:31.4; 11:14.5; 15:19.9	3+9 4+9; 0+1 0+1; 0+2 0+2; 1+3 1+3; 2+3 3+3	+4:07.2
18	10	Finland; Anniina Rantala; Henri Heikkinen; Anniina Rantala; Henri Heikkinen	46:38.5; 11:50.2; 10:33.6; 10:46.2; 13:28.3	0+5 5+9; 0+3 2+3; 0+2 3+3; 0+0 0+0; 0+0 0+3	+4:35.0
19	23	Slovenia; Lena Repinc; Jaša Zidar; Lena Repinc; Jaša Zidar	47:04.3; 10:21.1; 9:58.5; 11:58.9; 14:45.6	4+9 0+7; 0+0 0+2; 1+3 0+1; 2+3 0+3; 1+3 0+1	+5:00.8
20	15	Romania; Andrea Csutak; Nicolae Girbacea; Andrea Csutak; Nicolae Girbacea	47:42.9; 11:31.8; 10:15.5; 11:12.6; 14:42.8	1+6 2+10; 0+3 0+2; 0+0 2+3; 0+0 0+2; 1+3 0+3	+5:39.4
21	6	United States; Kaisa Bosek; Van Ledger; Kaisa Bosek; Van Ledger	48:30.2; 11:45.9; 11:07.6; 11:02.2; 14:34.4	0+4 4+7; 0+2 0+0; 0+2 2+3; 0+0 0+1; 0+0 2+3	+6:26.7
22	16	Slovakia; Sára Pacerová; Matej Badáň; Sára Pacerová; Matej Badáň	48:32.2; 11:37.5; 10:36.7; 11:49.5; 14:28.4	0+5 4+11; 0+2 0+2; 0+0 2+3; 0+2 1+3; 0+1 1+3	+6:28.7
23	24	Lithuania; Viktorija Augulytė; Darius Dinda; Viktorija Augulytė; Darius Dinda	49:04.1; 11:34.5; 10:28.1; 12:09.8; 14:51.5	0+5 1+5; 0+0 0+1; 0+2 0+1; 0+2 0+1; 0+1 1+2	+7:00.6
24	22	Latvia; Līva Šahno; Ņikita Kondrašovs; Līva Šahno; Ņikita Kondrašovs	49:42.5; 12:27.1; 10:16.0; 12:06.9; 14:52.4	1+6 4+11; 0+3 1+3; 0+0 1+3; 1+3 0+2; 0+0 2+3	+7:39.0
25	25	South Korea; Choi Yoo-nah; Cheon Yun-pil; Choi Yoo-nah; Cheon Yun-pil	50:41.1; 11:09.1; 11:13.8; 11:13.4; 17:04.7	3+8 1+10; 0+1 0+3; 1+3 1+3; 0+2 0+2; 2+2 0+2	+8:37.6
26	26	Australia; Luka Miskin; Christian Mahon; Luka Miskin; Christian Mahon	50:52.6; 12:31.2; 10:46.9; 11:03.4; 16:30.9	3+7 1+7; 1+3 0+2; 0+1 0+1; 0+0 0+1; 2+3 1+3	+8:49.1
27	28	Croatia; Doris Barićevac; Sven Kuprešak; Doris Barićevac; Sven Kuprešak	52:15.4; 13:13.9; 10:42.3; 13:02.7; 15:16.3	0+4 8+11; 0+1 4+3; 0+0 0+2; 0+3 3+3; 0+0 1+3	+10:11.9
28	27	Japan; Misa Sasaki; Chiharu Ueda; Misa Sasaki; Chiharu Ueda	52:38.7; 11:51.9; 13:09.1; 12:53.2; 14:44.3	4+9 6+11; 0+0 0+2; 3+3 4+3; 1+3 1+3; 0+3 1+3	+10:35.2
	29	Greece; Nefeli Tita; Angelos Antoniadis; Nefeli Tita; Angelos Antoniadis	DNF; 13:40.1; 13:19.6; 14:37.0	1+3 0+2; 2+3 1+3; 3+3 1+3	
	30	North Macedonia; Ana Marija Zafirovska; Darko Krsteski; Ana Marija Zafirovska; Darko Krsteski	DNF; 15:14.4; 12:19.6; 14:17.4	3+3 0+3; 3+3 1+3; 1+3 0+1	
