= Stepan Kinash =

Ukrainian biathlete (born 2002)

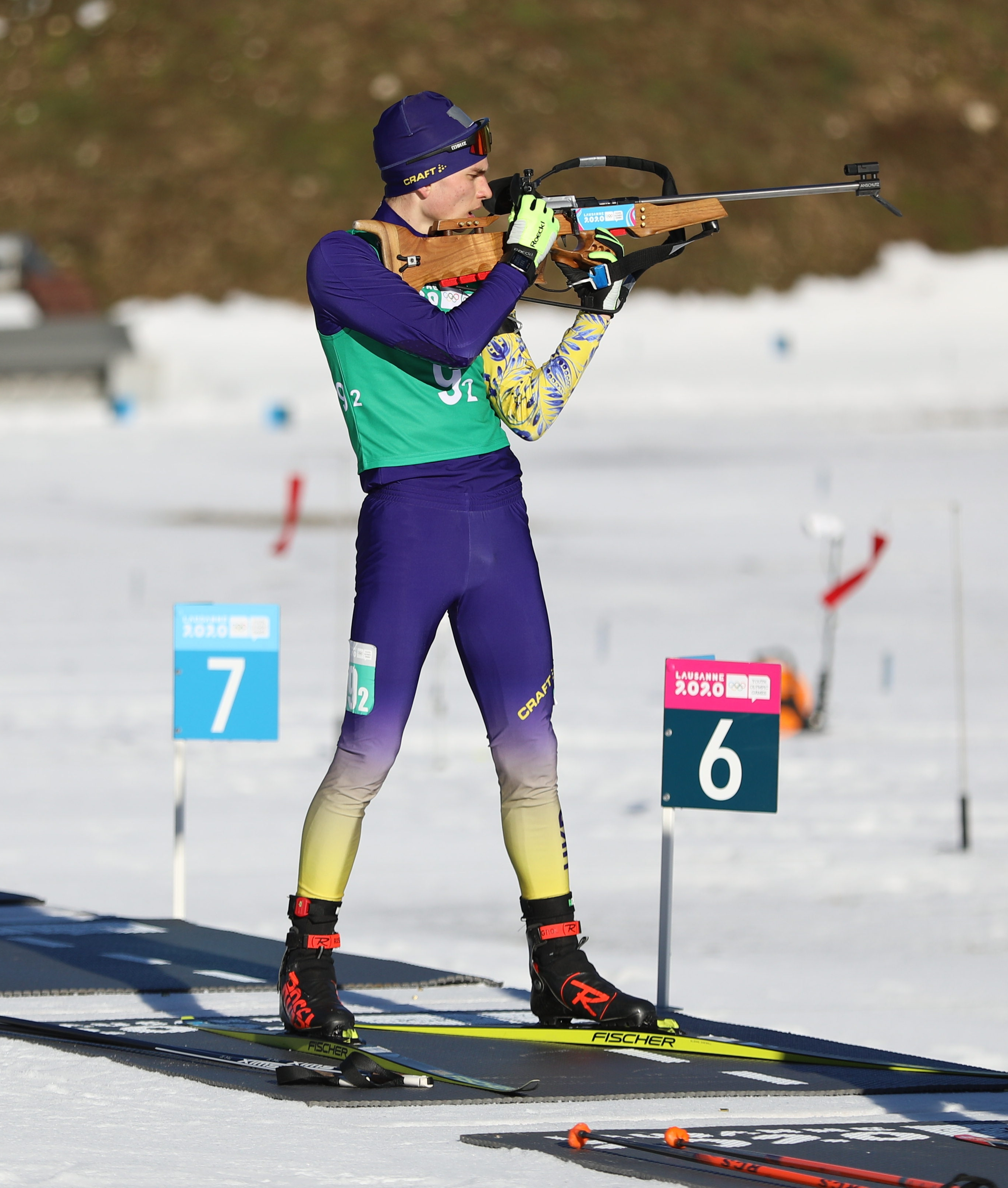
- Kinash in 2020

Personal information
- Nationality: Ukrainian
- Born: 5 February 2002 (age 24) Kharkiv, Ukraine

Sport
- Country: Ukraine
- Sport: Biathlon
Medal record
Men's biathlon
Representing Ukraine
Junior World Championships
| Silver medal – second place | 2024 Otepää | Men Relay |
Junior European Championships
| Bronze medal – third place | 2023 Madona | Mixed Relay |
Winter Universiade
| Bronze medal – third place | 2023 Lake Placid | Mixed relay |

Stepan Kinash (Ukrainian: Степан Кінаш, born 5 February 2002) is a Ukrainian biathlete.

== Biathlon results ==
All results are sourced from the International Biathlon Union.

=== Winter Youth Olympics ===
| Year | Event | IN | SP | SMRL | MRL |
|---|---|---|---|---|---|
| 2020 | Lausanne, Switzerland | 8 | 8 | 6 | 8 |

=== Youth / Junior World Championships ===
| Year | Event | IN | SP | PU | RL |
|---|---|---|---|---|---|
| 2020 | Lenzerheide, Switzerland | 12 | 29 | 13 | 7 |
| 2021 | Obertilliach, Austria | 53 | 33 | 15 | 10 |
| 2023 | Shchuchinsk, Kazakhstan | 17 | 42 | 41 | 11 |

=== IBU Junior Cup ===
==== Podiums ====
| Season | Place | Competition | Rank |
|---|---|---|---|
| 2021-22 | Martell-Val Martello, Italy | Individual | 2 |
| 2021-22 | Martell-Val Martello, Italy | 4x7.5 km Relay | 3 |
| 2022-23 | Haanja, Estonia | 4x7.5 km Relay | 2 |
| 2023-24 | Ridnaun-Val Ridanna, Italy | Mixed Relay | 1 |
