= Martina Trabucchi =

Italian biathlete (born 2002)

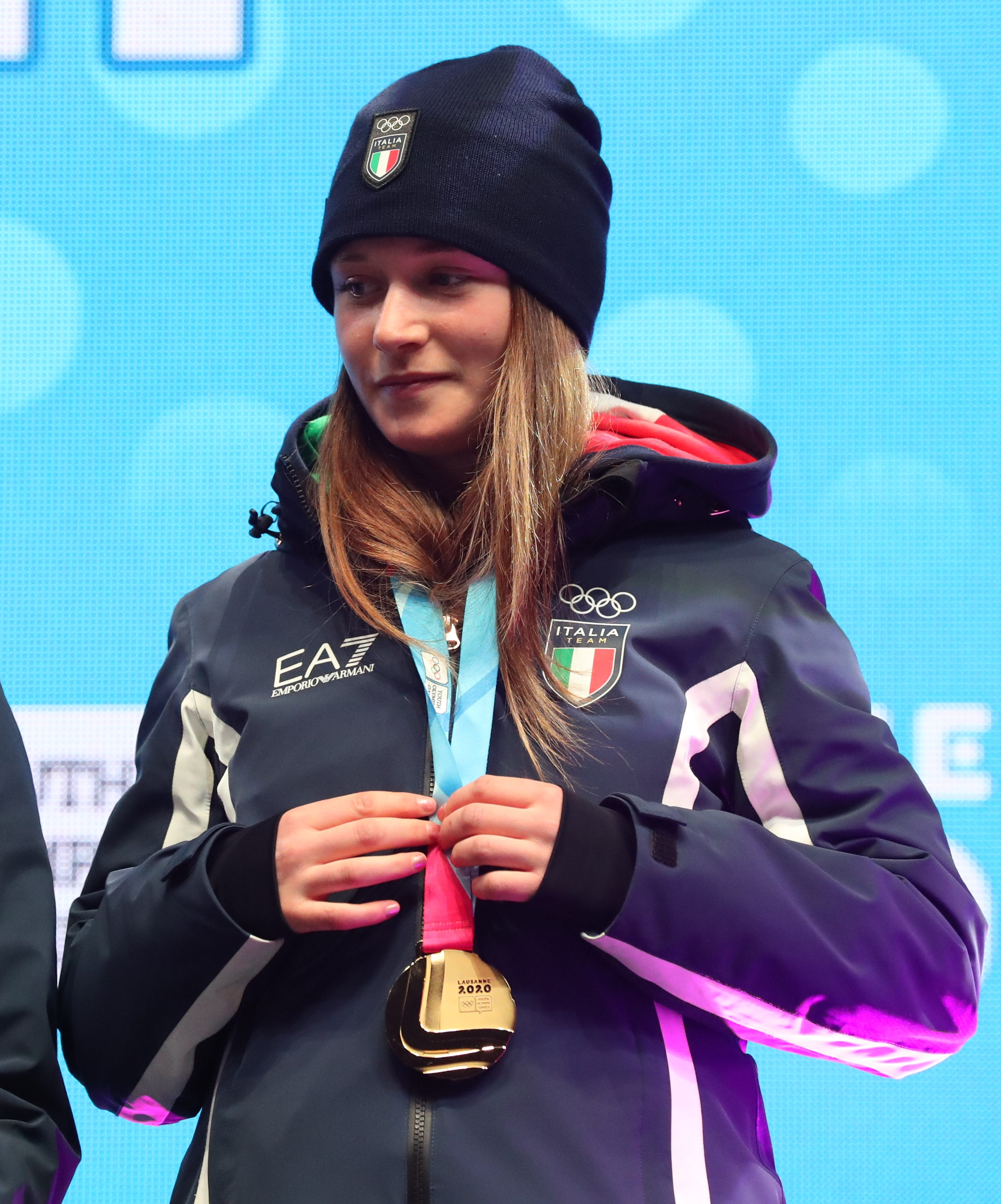
- Trabucchi at the 2020 Winter Youth Olympics

Personal information
- Nationality: Italian
- Born: 6 June 2002 (age 24) Aosta, Italy

Sport
- Country: Italy
- Sport: Biathlon
Medal record
Women's biathlon
Representing Italy
Youth Olympic Games
Gold medal – first place	2020 Lausanne	Mixed relay
Youth World Championships
Silver medal – second place	2021 Obertilliach	7.5 km pursuit
Bronze medal – third place	2021 Obertilliach	3 × 6 km relay

Martina Trabucchi (born 6 June 2002) is an Italian biathlete. She has competed in the Biathlon World Cup since 2024.

== Career ==
Martina Trabucchi made her international debut at the 2020 Youth Olympic Games, where she immediately won the gold medal in the mixed relay alongside Linda Zingerle, Nicolò Betemps, and Marco Barale. Additionally, she placed fourth in the individual event, missing out on a medal by just about 12 seconds. Following this, she participated in the Youth World Championships, achieving an 18th-place finish in the sprint among other results. The Italian performed better the following year, winning silver in the relay event with Zingerle and Sara Scattolo, as well as a silver medal in the pursuit, finishing behind Lena Repinc. Later that season, she competed in her first IBU Cup races in Obertilliach, where she immediately scored points with a 33rd-place finish in a sprint.

In the 2021/22 winter season, Trabucchi secured a podium finish in the Junior Cup and demonstrated her skills again toward the end of the season by finishing ninth in a sprint in Lenzerheide, marking her first top-10 finish in an IBU Cup race. Shortly thereafter, she placed 12th in Ridnaun and narrowly missed the podium with Patrick Braunhofer in the single mixed relay, finishing fourth. During the 2022/23 season, Trabucchi continued to score points regularly in the IBU Cup but did not reach the top 10. At her first European Championships, she failed to break into the top 40 due to weaker skiing performances. In the 2023/24 winter season, Trabucchi achieved three top-10 finishes in the IBU Cup, including a personal best of sixth place in a shortened individual race in Martell. However, the 2024 European Championships were again disappointing for her. At her final Junior World Championships, she narrowly missed medals, finishing fourth in both the individual and the relay events.

A strong start to the following season, combined with Rebecca Passler's inability to compete due to illness, gave Trabucchi the opportunity to make her World Cup debut in Hochfilzen in December 2024. She immediately qualified for the pursuit race and was selected to compete in the relay, where she teamed up with Hannah Auchentaller, Samuela Comola, and Michela Carrara to secure 11th place. The following week in Le Grand-Bornand, she finished 27th in the sprint, earning her first World Cup points. After a solid performance in the pursuit, Trabucchi qualified for the mass start, where she impressively hit all targets and finished 17th.

== Personal life ==
Martina Trabucchi comes from the municipality of Brusson in the Aosta Valley. Her sister Beatrice, who is two years older, is also active as a biathlete.

== Biathlon results ==
All results are sourced from the International Biathlon Union.

=== World Championships ===
Event	Individual	Sprint	Pursuit	Mass start	Relay	Mixed relay	Single mixed relay
(Switzerland) 2025 Lenzerheide	50th	53rd	LAP	—	—	—	—

=== Youth and Junior World Championships ===
2 medals (1 silver, 1 bronze)

Year	Age	Individual	Sprint	Pursuit	Mass Start	Relay
(Switzerland) 2020 Lenzerheide	17	51st	18th	24th	N/A	12th
(Austria) 2021 Obertilliach	18	9th	10th	Silver	N/A	Bronze
(Kazakhstan) 2023 Shchuchinsk	20	35th	24th	17th	N/A	5th
(Estonia) 2024 Otepää	21	4th	12th	N/A	20th	4th
