= Marco Barale =

Italian biathlete (born 2003)

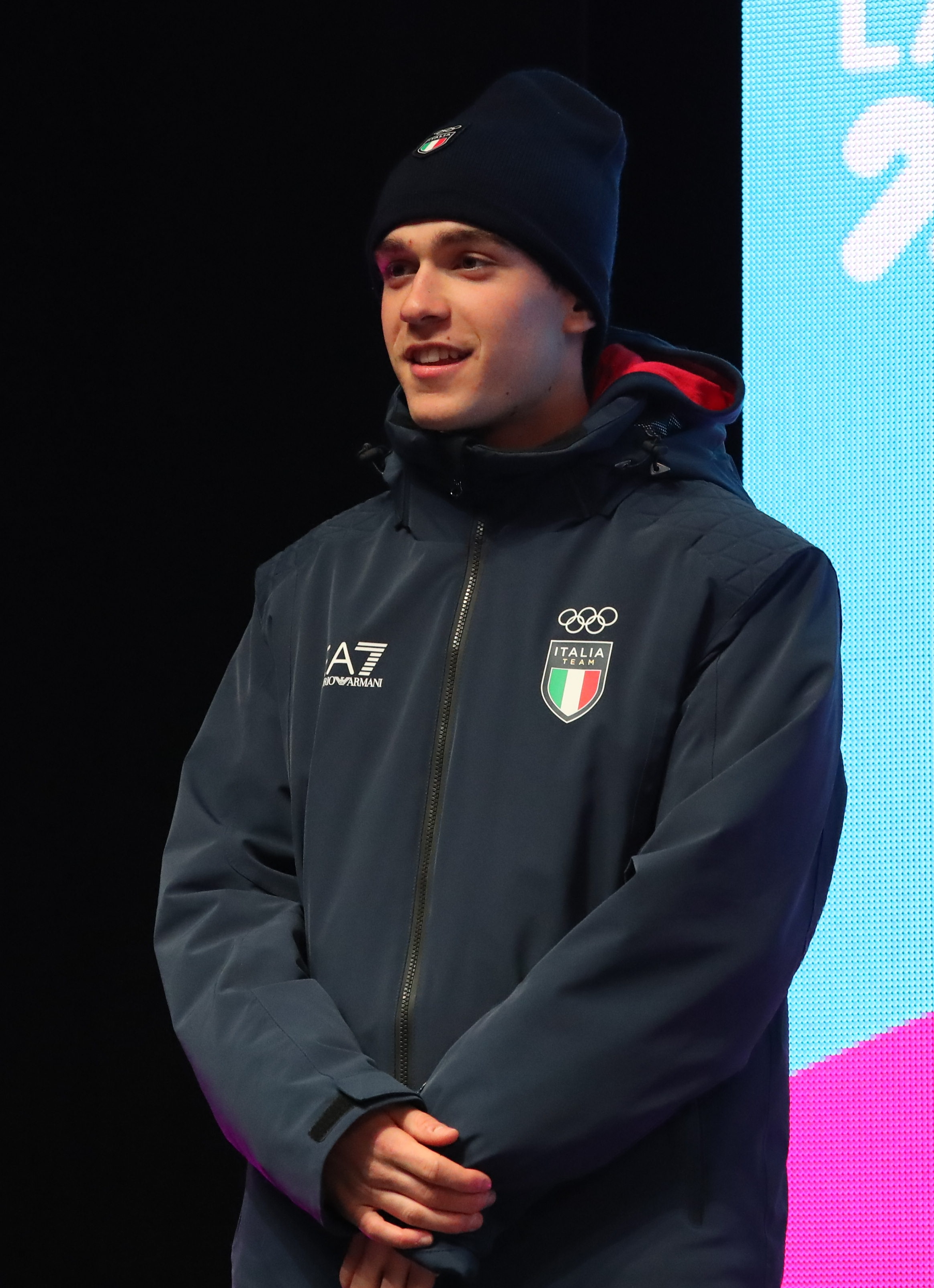
- Barale at the Youth Olympic Games in 2020

Personal information
- Nationality: Italian
- Born: 19 April 2003 (age 23) Cuneo, Italy

Sport
- Country: Italy
- Sport: Biathlon
Medal record
Men's biathlon
Representing Italy
Youth Olympic Games
Gold medal – first place	2020 Lausanne	Mixed relay
Silver medal – second place	2020 Lausanne	Single mixed relay
Junior World Championships
Bronze medal – third place	2023 Shchuchinsk	4 × 7.5 km relay
Youth World Championships
Bronze medal – third place	2021 Obertilliach	3 × 7.5 km relay
Bronze medal – third place	2022 Soldier Hollow	3 × 7.5 km relay

Marco Barale (born 19 April 2003) is an Italian biathlete.

== Career ==
He represented Italy at the 2020 Winter Youth Olympics. In the individual event, he finished in 22nd place, with seven missed shots across the four shooting stages. He also participated in the single mixed relay, competing alongside Linda Zingerle, and won a silver medal in this discipline.

In the 2024/25 season, he was called up to the main Italian national team to make his World Cup debut at the Oberhof stage.

== Biathlon results ==
All results are sourced from the International Biathlon Union.

=== Youth and Junior World Championships ===
3 medals (3 bronze)

Year	Age	Individual	Sprint	Pursuit	Mass Start	Relay
(Austria) 2021 Obertilliach	17	37th	7th	6th	N/A	Bronze
(United States) 2022 Soldier Hollow	18	38th	23rd	10th	N/A	Bronze
(Kazakhstan) 2023 Shchuchinsk	19	65th	DSQ	—	N/A	Bronze
(Estonia) 2024 Otepää	20	17th	27th	N/A	26th	9th
(Sweden) 2025 Östersund	21	17th	DNF	N/A	—	5th
