= Biathlon Junior World Championships 2021 =

Biathlon event in Austria

2021 IBU Youth & Junior World Championships
- Host city: Obertilliach, Austria
- Dates: 27 February – 6 March
- Events: 16
- Website: biathlon-obertilliach.com

The 2021 Biathlon Junior World Championships were held from 27 February to 6 March 2021 in Obertilliach, Austria.

== Schedule ==
All times are local (UTC+1).

Date	Time	Event
27 February	10:30	Youth Women's 10 km individual
27 February	13:30	Youth Men's 12.5 km individual
28 February	10:30	Junior Women's 12.5 km individual
28 February	13:30	Junior Men's 15 km individual
1 March	11:00	Youth Women's 6 km sprint
1 March	14:00	Youth Men's 7.5 km sprint
2 March	11:00	Junior Women's 7.5 km sprint
2 March	14:15	Junior Men's 10 km sprint
3 March	10:00	Youth Women's 7.5 km pursuit
3 March	11:00	Junior Women's 10 km pursuit
3 March	14:00	Youth Men's 10 km pursuit
3 March	15:00	Junior Men's 12.5 km pursuit
5 March	11:00	Youth Women's 3 × 6 km relay
5 March	14:00	Youth Men's 3 × 7.5 km relay
6 March	11:00	Junior Women's 4 × 6 km relay
6 March	14:00	Junior Men's 4 × 7.5 km relay

== Results ==
=== Junior events ===
==== Junior Men ====
Event	Gold		Silver		Bronze	
15 km Individual details	Philipp Lipowitz; Germany	38:37.1 (0+0+1+0)	Alex Cisar; Slovenia	38:48.1 (0+0+0+1)	Emilien Claude; France	39:15.0 (0+1+0+1)
10 km Sprint details	Emilien Claude; France	23:16.1 (0+0)	Mikuláš Karlík; Czech Republic	23:42.2 (0+1)	Mikhail Pervushin; Russia	23:47.4 (0+0)
12.5 km Pursuit details	Emilien Claude; France	32:16.5 (1+0+1+1)	Éric Perrot; France	32:24.2 (1+0+0+0)	Mikhail Pervushin; Russia	32:30.7 (2+0+0+0)
4 × 7.5 km Relay details	France Oscar Lombardot; Sébastien Mahon; Éric Perrot; Emilien Claude	1:12:48.8 (0+1) (0+0) (0+1) (1+3) (0+0) (0+2) (0+0) (0+1)	Norway Mats Øverby; Simen Eliassen Kvarme; Fredrik Arne Grusd; Jørgen Solhaug Sæter	1:13:02.1 (0+3) (0+1) (0+0) (1+3) (0+3) (0+0) (0+0) (0+0)	Czech Republic Tomáš Mikyska; Vítězslav Hornig; Jonáš Mareček; Mikuláš Karlík	1:14:12.3 (0+1) (0+0) (0+2) (0+0) (0+0) (0+2) (0+3) (0+3)

==== Junior Women ====
Event	Gold		Silver		Bronze	
12.5 km Individual details	Camille Bened; France	35:01.4 (0+0+0+0)	Henrieta Horvátová; Slovakia	36:26.8 (0+1+0+0)	Beatrice Trabucchi; Italy	36:35.7 (0+1+0+0)
7.5 km Sprint details	Amy Baserga; Switzerland	19:59.9 (0+0)	Rebecca Passler; Italy	20:22.1 (0+1)	Juni Arnekleiv; Norway	20:22.8 (0+1)
10 km Pursuit details	Amy Baserga; Switzerland	29:22.4 (0+0+1+0)	Synne Owren; Norway	30:04.2 (1+0+1+1)	Rebecca Passler; Italy	30:09.9 (0+1+1+1)
4 × 6 km Relay details	France Paula Botet; Eve Bouvard; Sophie Chauveau; Camille Bened	1:08:54.3 (0+0) (0+0) (0+2) (0+0) (0+1) (1+3) (0+2) (0+0)	Italy Hannah Auchentaller; Beatrice Trabucchi; Gaia Brunetto; Rebecca Passler	1:09:15.5 (0+1) (0+1) (0+0) (0+0) (0+0) (0+0) (0+1) (0+2)	Austria Anna Gandler; Anna Juppe; Lisa Osl; Lea Rothschopf	1:09:56.3 (0+0) (0+2) (0+1) (0+3) (0+0) (0+1) (0+2) (0+2)

=== Youth events ===
==== Youth Men ====
Event	Gold		Silver		Bronze	
12.5 km Individual details	Denis Irodov; Russia	36:35.6 (2+0+0+0)	Edgar Geny; France	37:08.0 (0+1+0+2)	Leon Kienesberger; Austria	37:08.3 (0+0+1+1)
7.5 km Sprint details	Denis Irodov; Russia	18:22.5 (0+0)	Fabio Piller Cottrer; Italy	18:43.6 (0+0)	Jan Guńka; Poland	18:50.4 (1+0)
10 km Pursuit details	Denis Irodov; Russia	27:13.3 (0+0+1+0)	Marcin Zawół; Poland	28:40.3 (1+0+1+0)	Oscar Andersson; Sweden	28:47.9 (1+0+1+2)
3 × 7.5 km Relay details	Poland Konrad Badacz; Jan Guńka; Marcin Zawół	59:16.5 (0+1) (0+1) (0+2) (0+2) (0+0) (0+1)	France Edgar Geny; Mathieu Garcia; Valentin Lejeune	59:29.7 (0+1) (0+1) (0+3) (0+3) (0+1) (0+1)	Italy Stefan Navillod; Fabio Piller Cottrer; Marco Barale	59:46.4 (0+0) (0+0) (0+0) (0+0) (0+0) (0+2)

==== Youth Women ====
Event	Gold		Silver		Bronze	
10 km Individual details	Jeanne Richard; France	32:18.8 (1+1+0+0)	Lena Repinc; Slovenia	32:51.5 (1+1+1+1)	Ema Kapustová; Slovakia	33:21.9 (0+0+0+0)
6 km Sprint details	Lena Repinc; Slovenia	17:04.9 (1+0)	Linda Zingerle; Italy	17:10.1 (1+0)	Selina Grotian; Germany	17:16.5 (0+0)
7.5 km Pursuit details	Lena Repinc; Slovenia	21:20.8 (0+0+1+1)	Martina Trabucchi; Italy	21:35.7 (0+0+0+1)	Linda Zingerle; Italy	21:46.8 (2+1+0+2)
3 × 6 km Relay details	France Fany Bertrand; Jeanne Richard; Maya Cloetens	53:30.5 (0+1) (0+1) (0+1) (0+3) (0+1) (0+0)	Slovenia Klara Vindišar; Kaja Zorč; Lena Repinc	53:43.7 (0+2) (0+0) (0+2) (0+1) (0+2) (0+1)	Italy Martina Trabucchi; Sara Scattolo; Linda Zingerle	55:02.2 (0+1) (0+1) (0+1) (0+2) (0+2) (3+3)

== Medal table ==
* Host nation (Austria)

Rank	Nation	Gold	Silver	Bronze	Total
1	France (FRA)	7	3	1	11
2	Russia (RUS)	3	0	2	5
3	Slovenia (SLO)	2	3	0	5
4	Switzerland (SUI)	2	0	0	2
5	Poland (POL)	1	1	1	3
6	Germany (GER)	1	0	1	2
7	Italy (ITA)	0	5	5	10
8	Norway (NOR)	0	2	1	3
9	Czech Republic (CZE)	0	1	1	2
9	Slovakia (SVK)	0	1	1	2
11	Austria (AUT)*	0	0	2	2
12	Sweden (SWE)	0	0	1	1
Totals (12 entries)		16	16	16	48
