= Ema Kapustová =

Slovak biathlete (born 2002)

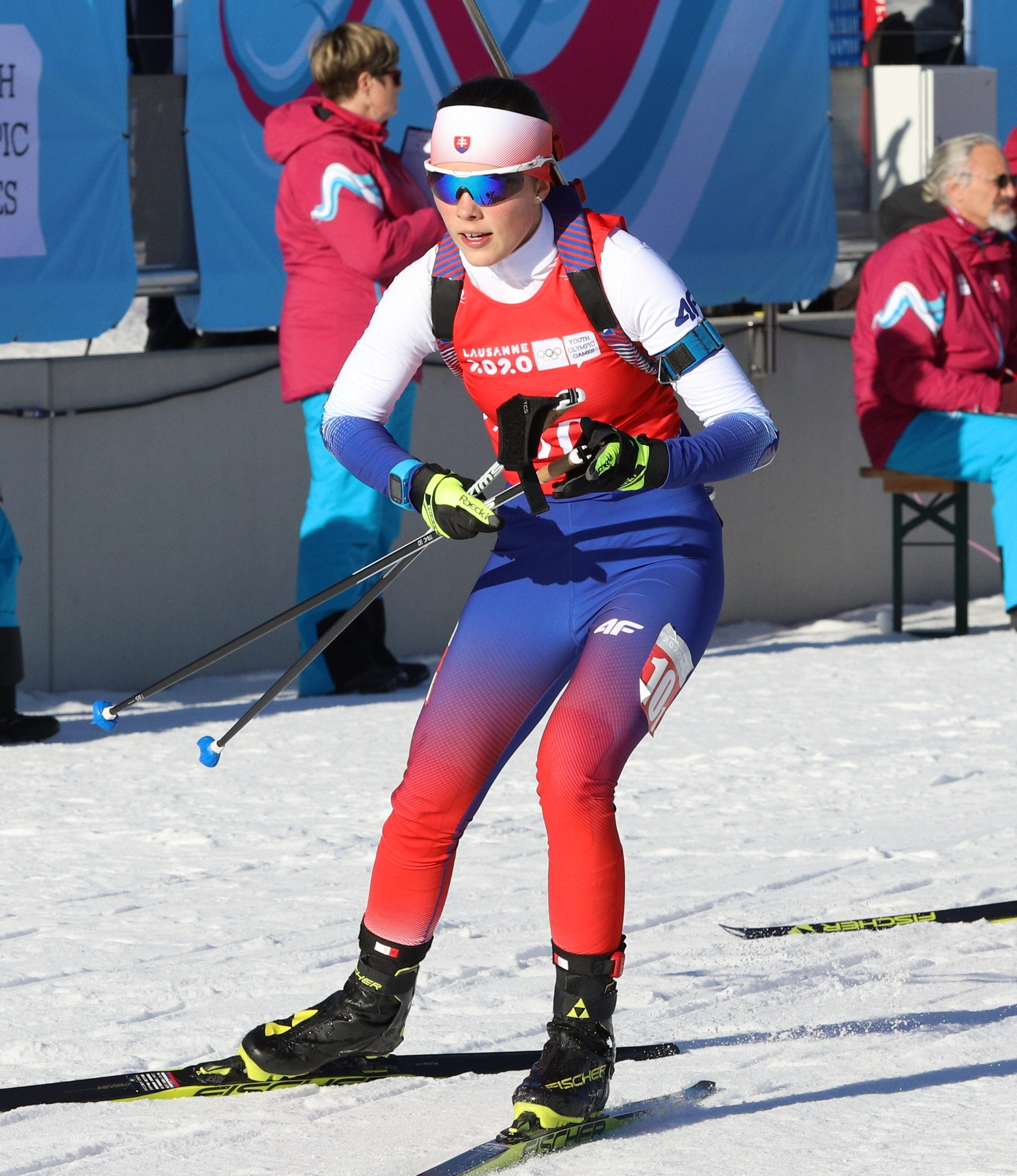
- Kapustová in 2020

Personal information
- Nationality: Slovak
- Born: 14 December 2002 (age 23) Revúca, Slovakia

Sport
- Country: Slovakia

Professional information
- Sport: Biathlon
- Club: Otchenash Team
- IBU Cup debut: 2021
- World Cup debut: 2023
Medal record
Women's biathlon
Representing Slovakia
European Championships
Bronze medal – third place	2024 Osrblie	15 km individual
Junior World Championships
Silver medal – second place	2024 Otepää	12.5 km individual
Silver medal – second place	2024 Otepää	9 km mass start 60
Youth World Championships
Bronze medal – third place	2021 Obertilliach	10 km Individual

Ema Kapustová (born 14 December 2002) is a Slovak biathlete. She made her debut in the Biathlon World Cup in 2023. Kapustová is a bronze medallist at the 2024 European Championships in the individual race.

== Career ==
Ema Kapustová made her international debut at the 2019 Youth World Championships in Osrblie, achieving a 21st place as her best result. She later participated in the Youth Olympic Games in Lausanne in January 2020, finishing eighth in the sprint event. Later Kapustová made her IBU Junior Cup debut and achieved a top-ten finish placement. In January 2021, she debuted in the IBU Cup but initially struggled despite good shooting results. However, she won a bronze medal at the Youth World Championships in Obertilliach and improved from 30th to 9th place in the pursuit event. In the 2021/22 season, she primarily competed in junior events, with a highlight being a top-10 finish at the Junior World Championships. She earned her first IBU Cup points in the following season, including a victory in the Junior Cup in a single-mixed relay.

In the summer of 2023, Kapustová won silver medals in the sprint and pursuit events at the Summer Biathlon Junior World Championships in Osrblie. She made her World Cup debut in Östersund in the winter of 2023/24 and achieved her first pursuit competition after finishing 56th in the sprint in Hochfilzen. She notably improved her performance in Lenzerheide, finishing 41st in the sprint and 28th in the pursuit, earning her first World Cup points. Kapustová won her first medal in the senior category at the European Championships in Slovakia on January 24, 2024, finishing with the third-best time in the individual race.

== Biathlon results ==
All results are sourced from the International Biathlon Union.

=== Olympic Games ===
0 medals

Event	Individual	Sprint	Pursuit	Mass start	Relay	Mixed relay
(Italy) 2026 Milano Cortina	48th	53rd	52nd	—	10th	—

=== World Championships ===
0 medals

Event	Individual	Sprint	Pursuit	Mass start	Relay	Mixed relay	Single mixed relay
(Switzerland) 2025 Lenzerheide	34th	—	—	—	6th	—	—

=== World Cup ===
Season	Overall			Individual		Sprint		Pursuit		Mass start	
Season	Races	Points	Position	Points	Position	Points	Position	Points	Position	Points	Position
2023–24	7/21	31	70th	—	—	2	82nd	29	49th	—	—

=== Youth and Junior World Championships ===
3 medals (2 silver, 1 bronze)

Year	Age	Individual	Sprint	Pursuit	Mass Start	Relay	Mixed relay
(Slovakia) 2019 Brezno-Osrblie	16	84th	32nd	21st	N/A	—	N/A
(Switzerland) 2020 Lenzerheide	17	25th	29th	33rd	N/A	16th	N/A
(Austria) 2021 Obertilliach	18	Bronze	30th	9th	N/A	9th	N/A
(United States) 2022 Soldier Hollow	19	15th	17th	9th	N/A	—	N/A
(Kazakhstan) 2023 Shchuchinsk	20	21st	26th	18th	N/A	14th	14th
(Estonia) 2024 Otepää	21	Silver	15th	N/A	Silver	6th	11th
