= Linda Zingerle =

Italian biathlete (born 2002)

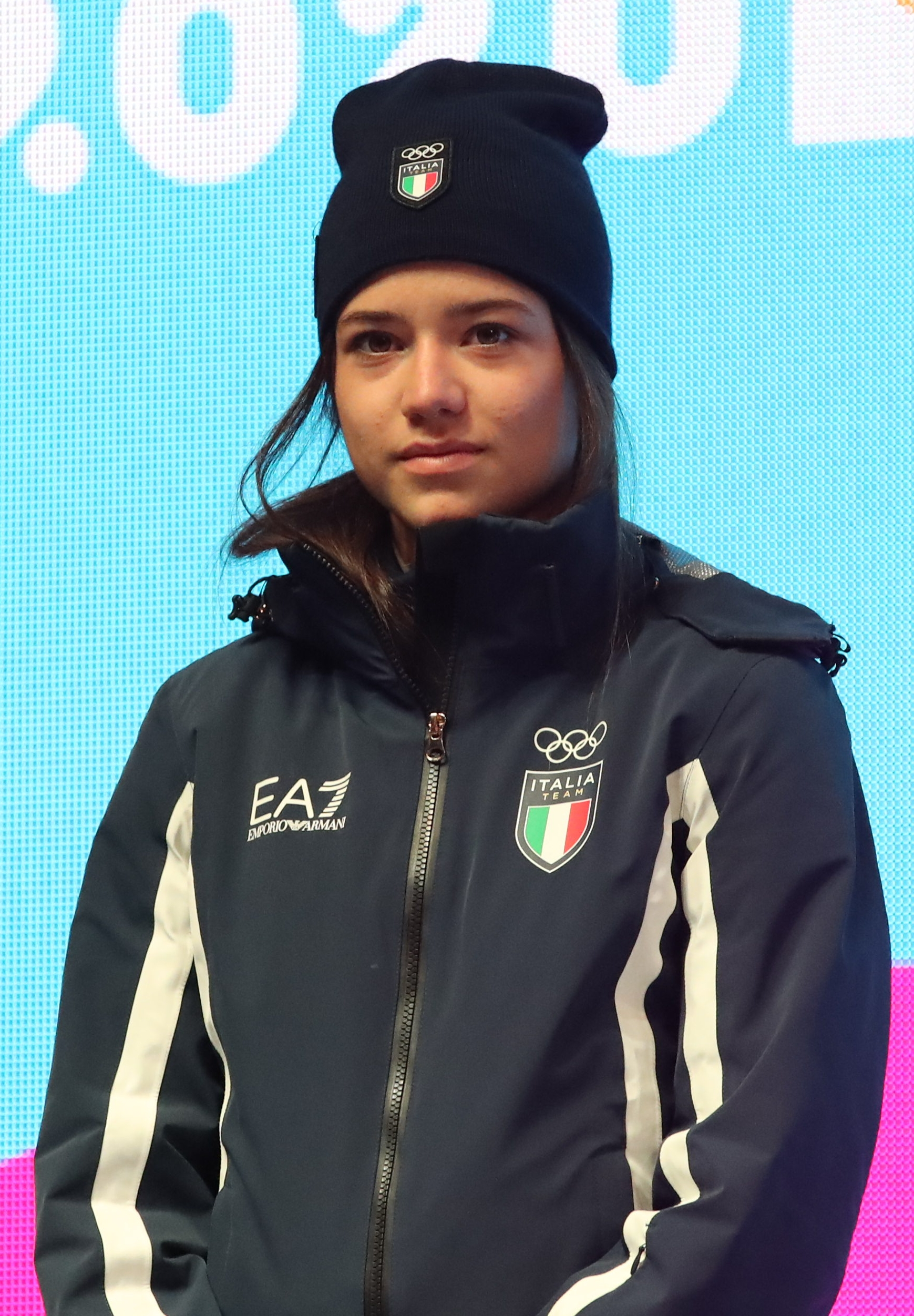
- Zingerle at the 2020 Winter Youth Olympics

Personal information
- Nationality: Italian
- Born: 14 September 2002 (age 23) Innichen, Italy

Sport
- Country: Italy
- Sport: Biathlon
Medal record
Women's biathlon
Representing Italy
European Championships
Bronze medal – third place	2025 Val Martello	10 km pursuit
Bronze medal – third place	2025 Val Martello	4 x 6 km relay
Youth Olympic Games
Gold medal – first place	2020 Lausanne	Mixed relay
Silver medal – second place	2020 Lausanne	Single mixed relay
Junior World Championships
Gold medal – first place	2022 Soldier Hollow	4 × 6 km relay
Youth World Championships
Gold medal – first place	2020 Lenzerheide	6 km sprint
Silver medal – second place	2021 Obertilliach	6 km sprint
Silver medal – second place	2020 Lenzerheide	3 × 6 km relay
Bronze medal – third place	2020 Lenzerheide	7.5 km pursuit
Bronze medal – third place	2021 Obertilliach	7.5 km pursuit
Bronze medal – third place	2021 Obertilliach	3 × 6 km relay

Linda Zingerle (born 14 September 2002) is an Italian biathlete. She made her debut in the Biathlon World Cup in 2021. She is a two-time Youth Olympic Games medalist, a seven-time medalist at the Junior and Youth World Championships, and a two-time medalist at the senior European Biathlon Championships.

== Career ==
Linda Zingerle competed in her first international races in December 2019 in Martell in the IBU Junior Cup. During the season, she participated in the Youth World Championships in Lenzerheide, where she convincingly won the gold medal in the sprint. She also secured bronze in the pursuit and silver in the relay alongside Hannah Auchentaller and Rebecca Passler.

The Youth Olympic Games were also successful for her; although she did not achieve a top-10 finish in the individual events, she won a gold and a silver medal in the mixed and single mixed relays. At the 2021 Youth World Championships, the Italian biathlete once again won three medals, including silver in the sprint behind Lena Repinc. At the end of the season, she made her IBU Cup debut in Obertilliach, finishing 20th in the individual race.

For the 2021/22 season, Zingerle was promoted to the B-team and competed regularly in the IBU Cup. On December 1, 2021, in Sjusjøen, she caused a major surprise by winning the super sprint despite two shooting misses, narrowly defeating Iryna Petrenko and Anastasiya Shevchenko in a close finish. However, she was unable to maintain this level of performance throughout the season and finished only 96th in her World Cup debut in the sprint at Ruhpolding. Nevertheless, she claimed gold in the relay at the Junior World Championships alongside Passler, Auchentaller, and Beatrice Trabucchi.

In the 2022/23 season, Zingerle achieved a podium finish in the Junior Cup with the mixed relay, though she did not win any medals at the Junior World Championships. In the IBU Cup, she recorded top-10 finishes in Pokljuka and Obertilliach, while at the European Championships, she secured an eighth-place finish in the individual event.

A similar pattern followed in the next season, as Zingerle finished 10th in the sprint at the European Championships and, together with Daniele Cappellari, placed fifth in the single mixed relay. Her best IBU Cup result was a seventh-place finish in the sprint in Idre. The Junior World Championships were less successful, with the only notable result being a fourth-place finish in the relay.

== Personal life ==
Linda Zingerle comes from Rasen-Antholz. She is the daughter of former biathlete and longtime Italian national coach Andreas Zingerle. Her two-year older brother, David, is also active as a biathlete.

== Biathlon results ==
All results are sourced from the International Biathlon Union.

=== World Cup ===
Season	Overall			Individual		Sprint		Pursuit		Mass start	
Season	Races	Points	Position	Points	Position	Points	Position	Points	Position	Points	Position
2021–22	1/21	Did not earn World Cup points									

=== Youth and Junior World Championships ===
7 medals (2 gold, 2 silver, 3 bronze)

Year	Age	Individual	Sprint	Pursuit	Mass Start	Relay	Mixed Relay
(Switzerland) 2020 Lenzerheide	17	32nd	Gold	Bronze	N/A	Silver	N/A
(Austria) 2021 Obertilliach	18	12th	Silver	Bronze	N/A	Bronze	N/A
(United States) 2022 Soldier Hollow	19	33rd	19th	25th	N/A	Gold	N/A
(Kazakhstan) 2023 Shchuchinsk	20	49th	16th	39th	N/A	5th	7th
(Estonia) 2024 Otepää	21	45th	30th	N/A	42nd	4th	—
