= Maya Cloetens =

French-Belgian biathlete (born 2002)

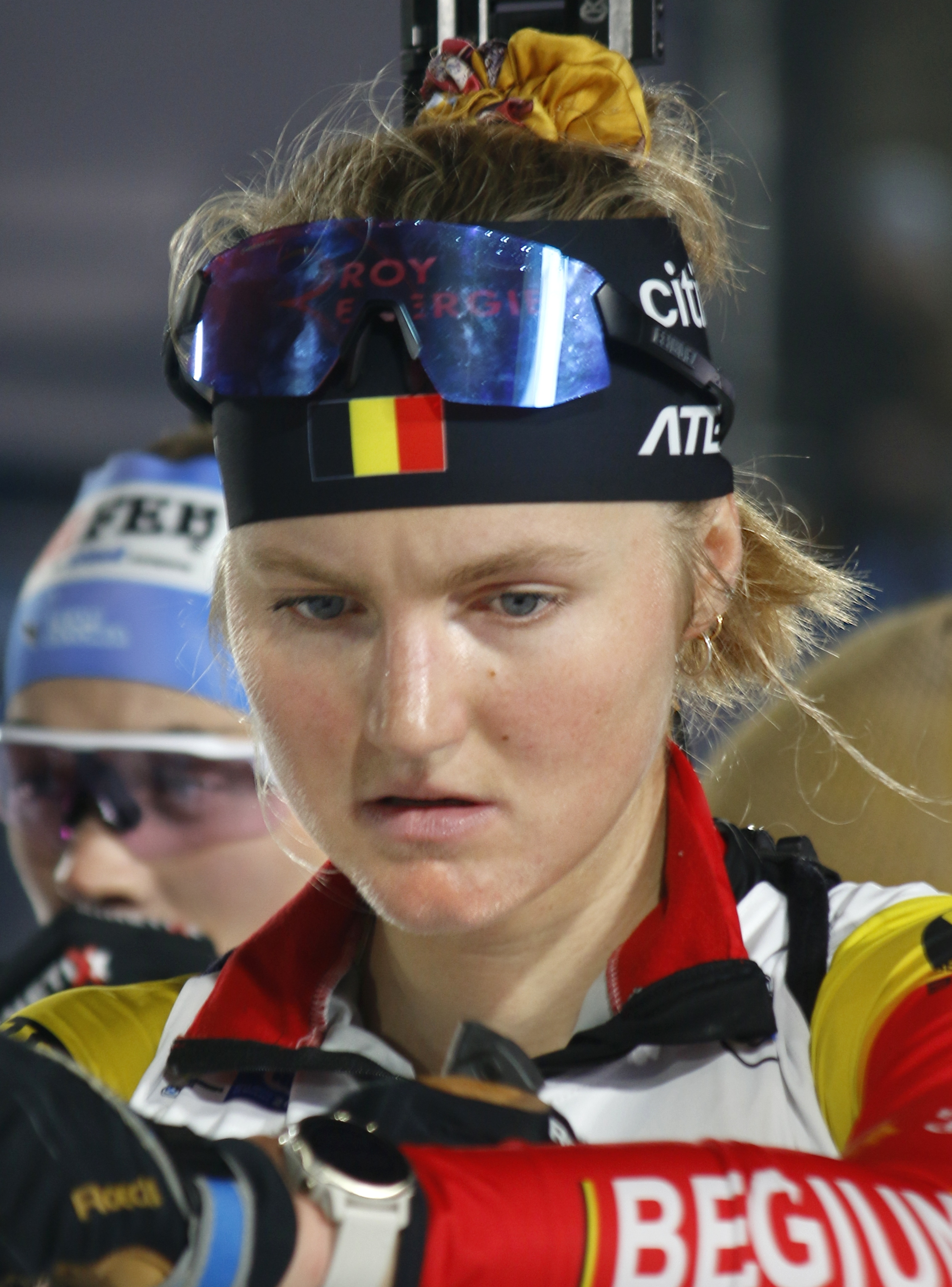
- Cloetens in 2024

Personal information
- Born: 8 January 2002 (age 24) Grenoble, France

Sport

Professional information
- Sport: Biathlon
- IBU Cup debut: 2022
- World Cup debut: 2023

World Championships
- Teams: 2 (2023, 2024)

World Cup
- Seasons: 2 (2022/23-)

European/IBU Cup
- Seasons: 2 (2022/23-)
Medal record
Women's biathlon
Representing France
Youth World Championships
Gold medal – first place	2021 Obertilliach	3 × 6 km relay

Maya Cloetens (born 8 January 2002) is a French-born Belgian biathlete. She has competed in the Biathlon World Cup since 2023.

== Career ==
Maya Cloeten's first international races took place at the 2019 Olympic Youth Festival in Sarajevo, where she won the silver medal with the mixed relay team. The following year, she participated in the Biathlon Junior World Championships 2020 in Lenzerheide, achieving her best result as fifth in the sprint and with the relay team. In the subsequent year, she competed in the Youth World Championships again, repeating her sprint performance from 2020, but the relay team, including Cloetens, significantly improved, securing victory with Fany Bertrand and Jeanne Richard. After a year without international tournament participation, she won the French U-23 individual championship in March 2022.

Shortly after winning the national title, the French association expelled Cloetens from the team due to a "lack of perspective," denying her support. As she also holds Belgian citizenship due to family ties, she decided to represent Belgium in the future. Unlike naturalization, she did not face a multi-year suspension. Her initial competitions for the new nation occurred at the French Summer Championships on roller skis in September. With the exception of Lotte Lie, there were no other female athletes in the Belgian national team, leading Cloetens to participate immediately in the IBU Cup in the winter of 2022/23, achieving three top-30 results. In the Junior Cup in December, she dominated with four podium finishes, although she did not win any races, initially leading the rankings.

In January 2023, Cloetens made her World Cup debut at Pokljuka, finishing 43rd and 42nd in the sprint and pursuit, respectively, coming close to earning World Cup points. Despite a severe fall by Thierry Langer in the mixed relay, she, along with Lotte Lie and Florent Claude, secured tenth place. The Belgian athlete also participated in the World Championships in her debut year, finishing 38th and 40th in the sprint and pursuit. However, as of 2023, World Championship results no longer contribute to World Cup rankings, and she did not receive points for her performance. The Junior World Championships were disappointing, but at the end of the season, Cloetens earned her first World Cup points by finishing 36th in the sprint race in Oslo.

== Personal life ==
Cloetens originates from Grenoble and was born in France, initially representing the French Ski Federation. As her father is from Flanders, she holds dual French-Belgian citizenship since birth. Currently, she is pursuing studies in civil engineering in her hometown of Grenoble. Cloetens is a left-handed shooter.

== Biathlon results ==
All results are sourced from the International Biathlon Union.

=== Olympic Games ===
0 medals

Event	Individual	Sprint	Pursuit	Mass start	Relay	Mixed relay
(Italy) 2026 Milano Cortina	33rd	26th	37th	—	13th	18th

=== World Championships ===
Event	Individual	Sprint	Pursuit	Mass start	Relay	Mixed relay	Single mixed relay
Representing Belgium
(Germany) 2023 Oberhof	—	38th	40th	—	—	14th	—
(Czech Republic) 2024 Nové Město na Moravě	33rd	55th	41st	—	14th	8th	—
(Switzerland) 2025 Lenzerheide	37th	8th	17th	14th	13th	10th	—

=== Youth and Junior World Championships ===
3 medals (3 bronzes)

Year	Age	Individual	Sprint	Pursuit	Relay
Representing France
(Switzerland) 2020 Lenzerheide	18	23rd	5th	27th	5th
(Austria) 2021 Obertilliach	19	7th	5th	17th	Gold
Representing Belgium
(Kazakhstan) 2023 Shchuchinsk	21	16th	12th	21st	16th
