= Marcin Zawół =

Polish biathlete (born 2002)

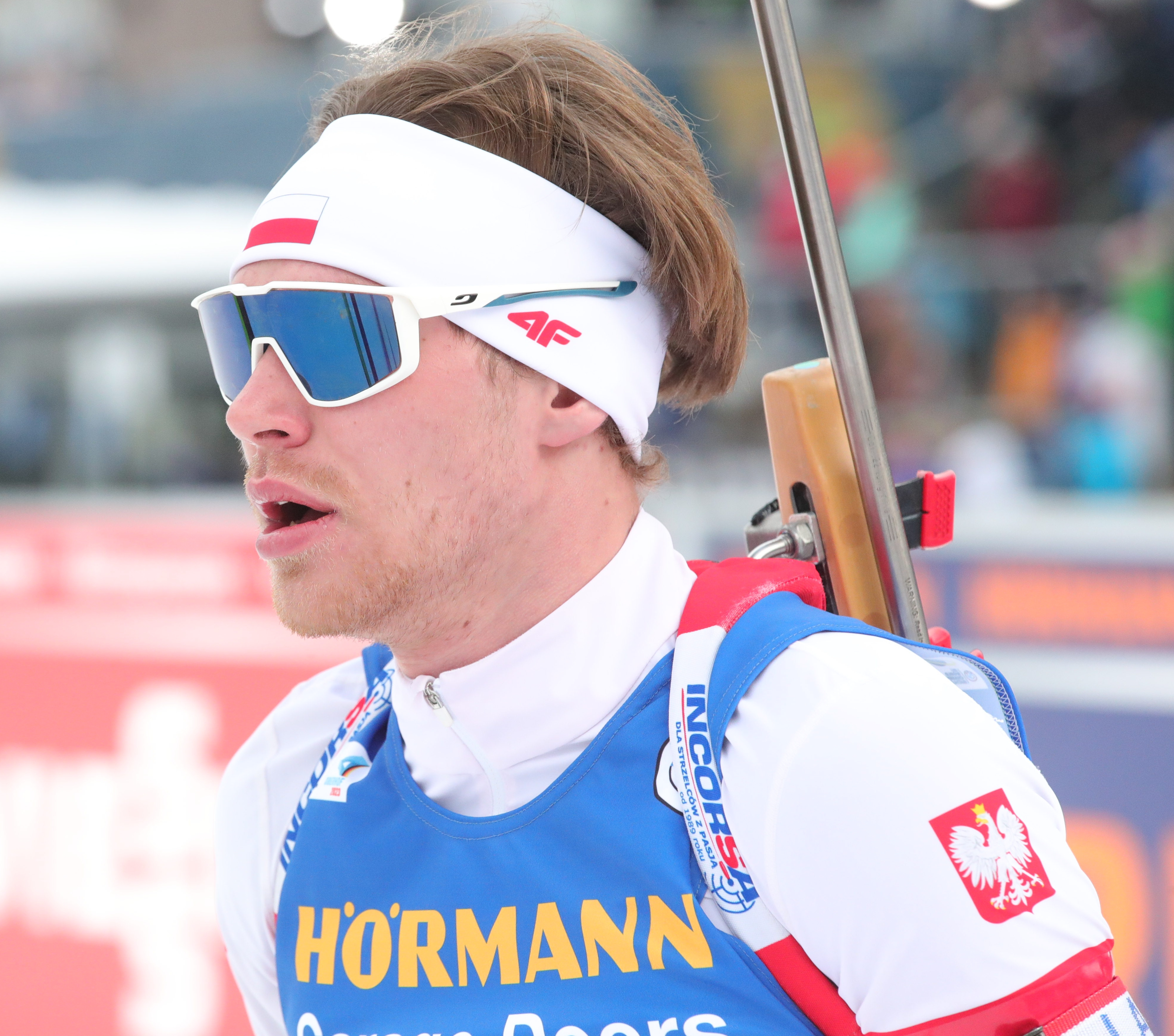
- Zawół in 2023

Personal information
- Nationality: Polish
- Born: 29 May 2002 (age 24) Kowary, Poland

Sport
- Country: Poland
- Sport: Biathlon
Medal record
Men's biathlon
Representing Poland
Winter Youth Olympics
Gold medal – first place	2020 Lausanne	Sprint
Youth World Championships
Gold medal – first place	2021 Obertilliach	3 × 7.5 km relay
Silver medal – second place	2021 Obertilliach	10 km Pursuit

Marcin Zawół (born 29 May 2002) is a Polish biathlete. He made his debut in the Biathlon World Cup in 2022.

== Career ==
Marcin Zawół competes for MKS Karkonosze Sporty Zimowe. His first international appearances were at the 2019 Junior World Championships in Brezno-Osrblie, where he finished 72nd in the individual, 49th in the sprint, and 42nd in the pursuit. In the 2019/20 season, he competed mainly in the IBU Junior Cup, consistently finishing in the top 20 in individual races and the top 10 with the Polish relay team.

Due to the COVID-19 pandemic, the 2020/21 IBU Junior Cup was canceled, but Zawół got his first senior-level opportunities, including a 50th-place finish in the IBU Cup at Arber. At the 2020 Junior World Championships in Lenzerheide, he placed 8th in the pursuit after finishing 26th in the sprint. His biggest career achievement came at the 2020 Youth Olympic Games, where he won gold in the sprint. He also finished 12th in the individual, 6th in the mixed relay, and 13th in the single mixed relay.

In 2021/22, he returned to the IBU Junior Cup, securing two relay wins and a podium in the super sprint. This earned him a World Cup debut in Oberhof, where he placed 60th in the sprint and 55th in the pursuit. He remained in the World Cup team but did not surpass his 55th place. At the 2022 Junior World Championships in the Soldier Hollow, he finished 22nd in the individual.

The 2022/23 season saw him competing regularly in the World Cup, excelling in relays. He helped Poland achieve its first men's relay top-10 finish since 2006/07, placing 8th in the mixed relay in Pokljuka and 10th in the men's relay in Ruhpolding.

== Biathlon results ==
All results are sourced from the International Biathlon Union.

=== Olympic Games ===
0 medals

Event	Individual	Sprint	Pursuit	Mass start	Relay	Mixed relay
(Italy) 2026 Milano Cortina	43rd	69th	—	—	11th	—

=== World Championships ===
Event	Individual	Sprint	Pursuit	Mass start	Relay	Mixed relay	Single mixed relay
(Germany) 2023 Oberhof	50th	74th	—	—	17th	22nd	16th
(Czech Republic) 2024 Nové Město	—	—	—	—	9th	13th	—
(Switzerland) 2025 Lenzerheide	—	87th	—	—	16th	—	17th

=== World Cup ===
Season	Overall			Individual		Sprint		Pursuit		Mass start	
Season	Races	Points	Position	Points	Position	Points	Position	Points	Position	Points	Position
2021–22	5/22	Did not earn World Cup points									
2022–23	5/21	Did not earn World Cup points									
2023–24	7/21	Did not earn World Cup points									

=== Youth and Junior World Championships ===
2 medals (1 gold, 1 silver)

Year	Age	Individual	Sprint	Pursuit	Mass Start	Relay
(Slovakia) 2019 Brezno-Osrblie	16	72nd	49th	42nd	N/A	9th
(Switzerland) 2020 Lenzerheide	17	14th	25th	8th	N/A	6th
(Austria) 2021 Obertilliach	18	31st	5th	Silver	N/A	Gold
(United States) 2022 Soldier Hollow	19	22nd	41st	37th	N/A	—
(Kazakhstan) 2023 Shchuchinsk	20	42nd	15th	7th	N/A	5th
(Estonia) 2024 Otepää	21	—	39th	N/A	—	6th
