= Eve Bouvard =

French-Belgian biathlete (born 2002)

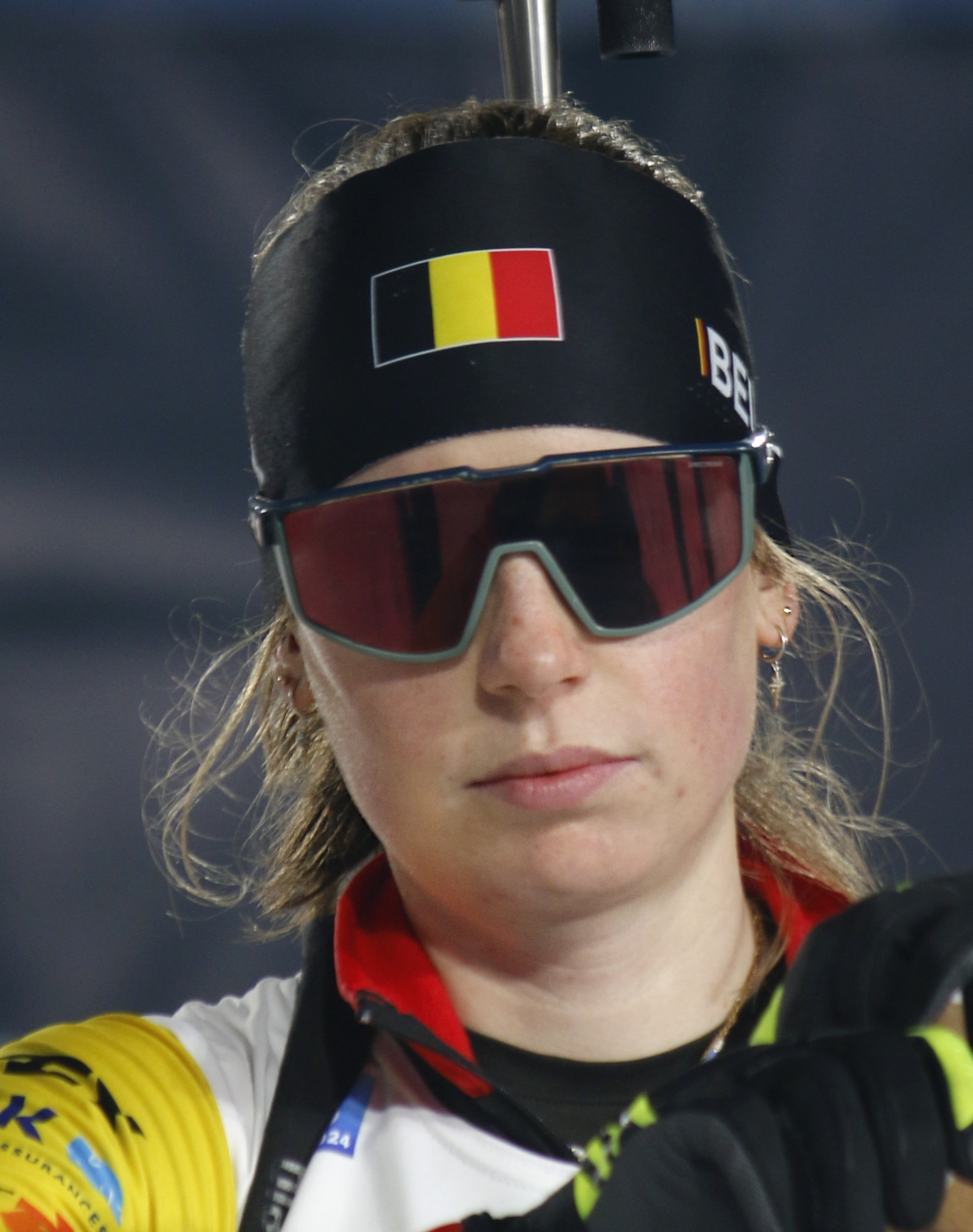
- Bouvard in 2024

Personal information
- Born: 18 August 1999 (age 26) Albertville, France

Sport

Professional information
- Sport: Biathlon
- IBU Cup debut: 14 January 2021
- World Cup debut: 9 February 2024
Medal record
Women's biathlon
Representing France
Youth World Championships
Gold medal – first place	2021 Obertilliach	3 × 6 km relay

Eve Bouvard (born August 18, 1999, in Albertville) is a French-Belgian biathlete. She became Junior World Champion with the French relay team in 2021 and has competed for the Belgian Biathlon Federation since 2023.

== Career ==
Eve Bouvard's first international races took place in March 2020 at the Hohenzollern Skistadion in Arber ski resort, where she competed in several IBU Junior Cup events. In January of the following year, she made her IBU Cup debut at the same venue, finishing 23rd in the sprint and earning her first ranking points. Shortly afterward, the Frenchwoman competed in her first Junior World Championships and after finishing 7th in the sprint, she won the gold medal in the relay alongside Paula Botet, Sophie Chauveau, and Camille Bened. During the winter of 2022/23, Bouvard competed exclusively at the national level and convincingly won the overall title in the Coupe de France. Despite her overall victory, the French federation dropped Bouvard from their national team shortly afterward. Because she also holds Belgian citizenship through family ties, she decided in May 2023 to represent Belgium and, unlike with naturalization, did not face a multi-year ban. At the start of the IBU Cup season, Bouvard competed for the Belgian Biathlon Federation in the IBU Cup for the first time and immediately achieved respectable results, finishing 16th in Idre and 14th in Sjusjøen. Despite not competing in any races during January, the Belgian was subsequently selected for the 2024 World Championships in Nové Město na Moravě, marking her debut at the highest level of competition. Her performance there was quite convincing, with two 49th-place finishes in the sprint and pursuit, as well as 35th in the individual race. She then competed in the World Cup in the final trimester but did not come close to scoring points.

At the start of the 2024/25 World Cup season in Kontiolahti, Belgium with Bouvard fielded for the first time ever a women's relay team in a Biathlon World Cup event and achieved a historic 13th place. She also earned her first World Cup points at the same venue with a 37th-place finish in the individual event. She was unable to maintain this form in the subsequent season, failing to achieve a top-50 finish in either the World Cup or the 2025 World Championships. In those 2025 World Championships she did finish 13th with the Belgium women's relay team. One year later Bouvard was selected to represent Belgium at the 2026 Winter Olympics where she finished again 13th with the women's relay team.

== Biathlon results ==
=== Olympic Games ===
0 medals

Event	Individual	Sprint	Pursuit	Mass start	Relay	Mixed relay
(Italy) 2026 Milano Cortina	83rd	74th	—	—	13th	—

=== World Championships ===
0 medals

Event	Individual	Sprint	Pursuit	Mass start	Relay	Mixed relay	Single mixed relay
Representing Belgium
(Czech Republic) 2024 Nové Město na Moravě	35th	49th	49st	—	14th	—	—
(Switzerland) 2025 Lenzerheide	66th	57th	52th	—	13th	—	—

=== Youth and Junior World Championships ===
1 medals (1 gold)

Year	Age	Individual	Sprint	Pursuit	Relay
Representing France
(Austria) 2021 Obertilliach	21	40th	7th	40th	Gold

== Personal life ==
Bouvard comes from the Savoy region and was born in France, so she originally competed for the French Ski Federation. Since her mother is from Wallonia and therefore Belgian, Bouvard has held dual citizenship since birth.
