= Biathlon at the 2020 Winter Youth Olympics =

Biathlon at the III Winter Youth Olympic Games
- Venue: Les Tuffes
- Dates: 11–15 January
- Competitors: 196 from 39 nations

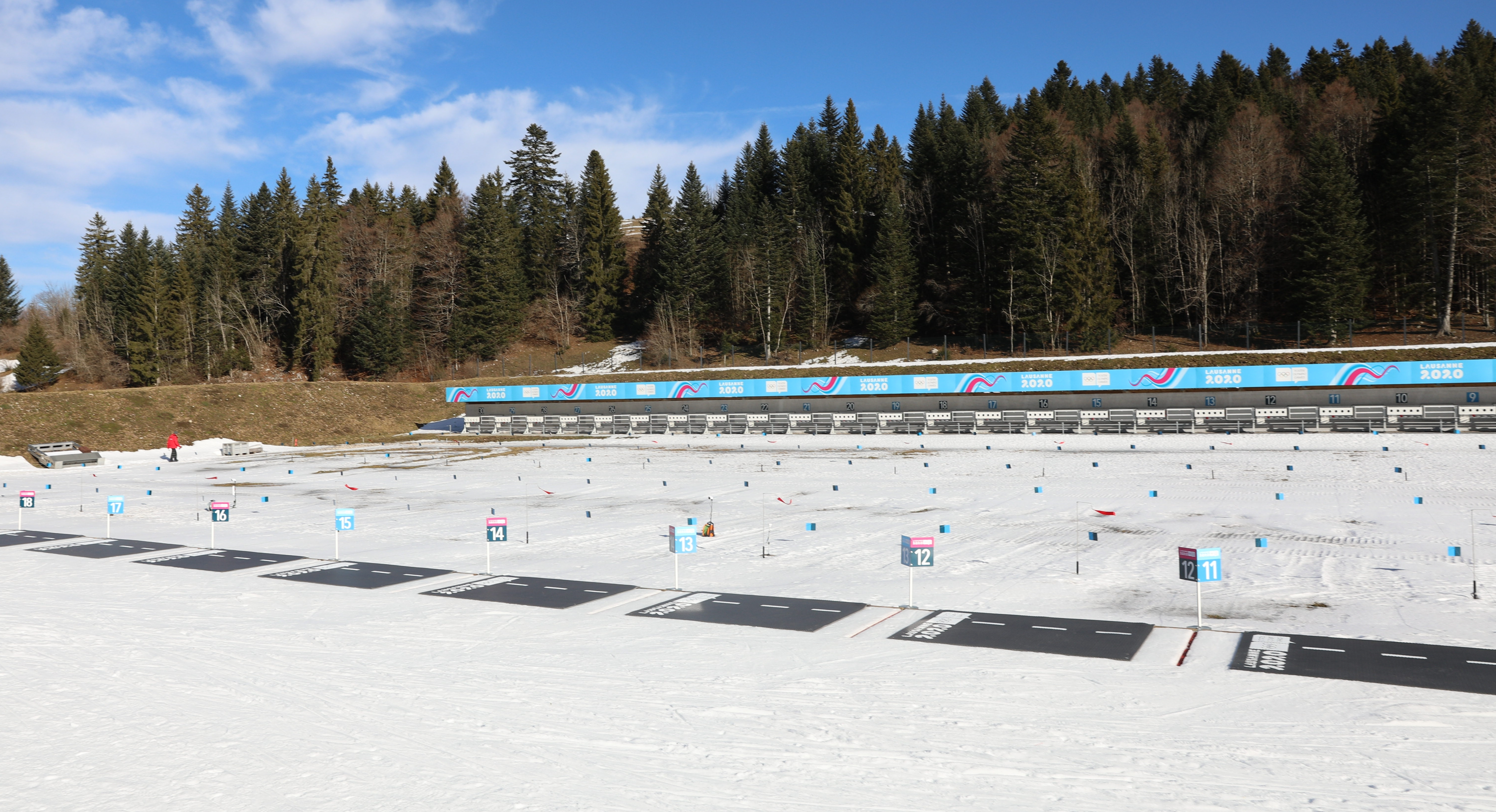
Biathlon stadium in Les Tuffes

Biathlon at the 2020 Winter Youth Olympics took place in Les Tuffes, France.

== Events ==
=== Medal table ===
* Host nation (Switzerland)

| Rank | Nation | Gold | Silver | Bronze | Total |
|---|---|---|---|---|---|
| 1 | Russia | 3 | 3 | 0 | 6 |
| 2 | France | 1 | 1 | 2 | 4 |
| 3 | Italy | 1 | 1 | 0 | 2 |
| 4 | Poland | 1 | 0 | 0 | 1 |
| 5 | Austria | 0 | 1 | 1 | 2 |
| 6 | Belarus | 0 | 0 | 1 | 1 |
| 6 | Norway | 0 | 0 | 1 | 1 |
| 6 | Sweden | 0 | 0 | 1 | 1 |
| Totals (8 entries) | | 6 | 6 | 6 | 18 |

=== Boys' events ===
| Event | Gold | | Silver | | Bronze | |
|---|---|---|---|---|---|---|
| Sprint | Marcin Zawół; Poland | 19:23.8 (0+1) | Denis Irodov; Russia | 19:36.4 (0+1) | Vegard Thon; Norway | 19:42.3 (0+1) |
| Individual | Oleg Domichek; Russia | 34:09.4 (1+1+0+0) | Lukas Haslinger; Austria | 34:23.0 (1+1+0+0) | Mathieu Garcia; France | 35:04.3 (2+0+0+1) |

=== Girls' events ===
| Event | Gold | | Silver | | Bronze | |
|---|---|---|---|---|---|---|
| Sprint | Alena Mokhova; Russia | 18:55.5 (0+1) | Anastasiia Zenova; Russia | 18:57.4 (0+1) | Anna Andexer; Austria | 19:01.6 (0+1) |
| Individual | Alena Mokhova; Russia | 32:26.7 (1+0+0+1) | Jeanne Richard; France | 33:30.5 (0+0+1+1) | Yuliya Kavaleuskaya; Belarus | 33:59.5 (0+2+1+0) |

=== Mixed events ===
| Event | Gold | | Silver | | Bronze | |
|---|---|---|---|---|---|---|
| Single mixed relay | France; Jeanne Richard; Mathieu Garcia; Jeanne Richard; Mathieu Garcia | 42:03.5 (0+2) (0+0) (0+2) (0+0) (0+0) (0+1) (0+1) (0+1) | Italy; Linda Zingerle; Marco Barale; Linda Zingerle; Marco Barale | 42:23.0 (0+2) (0+2) (0+1) (1+3) (0+0) (1+3) (0+3) (0+2) | Sweden; Sara Andersson; Oscar Andersson; Sara Andersson; Oscar Andersson | 42:30.3 (0+1) (0+1) (0+1) (0+2) (0+0) (0+1) (1+3) (1+3) |
| Mixed relay | Italy; Martina Trabucchi; Linda Zingerle; Nicolò Betemps; Marco Barale | 1:10:55.3 (0+0) (0+0) (0+0) (0+3) (0+1) (0+1) (0+0) (0+0) | Russia; Alena Mokhova; Anastasiia Zenova; Denis Irodov; Oleg Domichek | 1:11:39.0 (0+2) (0+1) (0+1) (0+0) (0+0) (0+3) (0+2) (1+3) | France; Fany Bertrand; Léonie Jeannier; Théo Guiraud-Poillot; Mathieu Garcia | 1:12:23.9 (1+3) (0+2) (0+2) (0+3) (0+0) (0+3) (0+0) (0+0) |

== Qualification ==
=== Summary ===
| NOC | Boys' | Girls' | Total |
|---|---|---|---|
| Australia | 3 | 3 | 6 |
| Austria | 4 | 4 | 8 |
| Belarus | 3 | 3 | 6 |
| Bosnia and Herzegovina | 3 | | 3 |
| Brazil | | 1 | 1 |
| Bulgaria | 3 | 3 | 6 |
| Canada | 3 | 3 | 6 |
| China | 3 | 1 | 4 |
| Croatia | 1 | 2 | 3 |
| Czech Republic | 4 | 4 | 8 |
| Estonia | 3 | 3 | 6 |
| Finland | 3 | 3 | 6 |
| France | 4 | 4 | 8 |
| Germany | 4 | 4 | 8 |
| Great Britain | | 1 | 1 |
| Greece | 1 | 3 | 4 |
| Italy | 4 | 4 | 8 |
| Japan | 3 | 2 | 5 |
| Kazakhstan | 3 | 3 | 6 |
| Kyrgyzstan | | 1 | 1 |
| Latvia | 3 | 3 | 6 |
| Lithuania | 3 | 3 | 6 |
| Moldova | 1 | 1 | 2 |
| Mongolia | 1 | 1 | 2 |
| New Zealand | 1 | | 1 |
| North Macedonia | 1 | 1 | 2 |
| Norway | 4 | 4 | 8 |
| Poland | 3 | 3 | 6 |
| Romania | 3 | 3 | 6 |
| Russia | 4 | 4 | 8 |
| Serbia | 1 | | 1 |
| Slovakia | 3 | 3 | 6 |
| Slovenia | 3 | 3 | 6 |
| South Korea | 1 | 1 | 2 |
| Sweden | 3 | 3 | 6 |
| Switzerland | 4 | 4 | 8 |
| Turkey | 1 | 1 | 2 |
| Ukraine | 4 | 4 | 8 |
| United States | 3 | 3 | 6 |
| Total: 39 NOCs | 99 | 97 | 196 |
