= Lena Repinc =

Slovenian biathlete (born 2003)

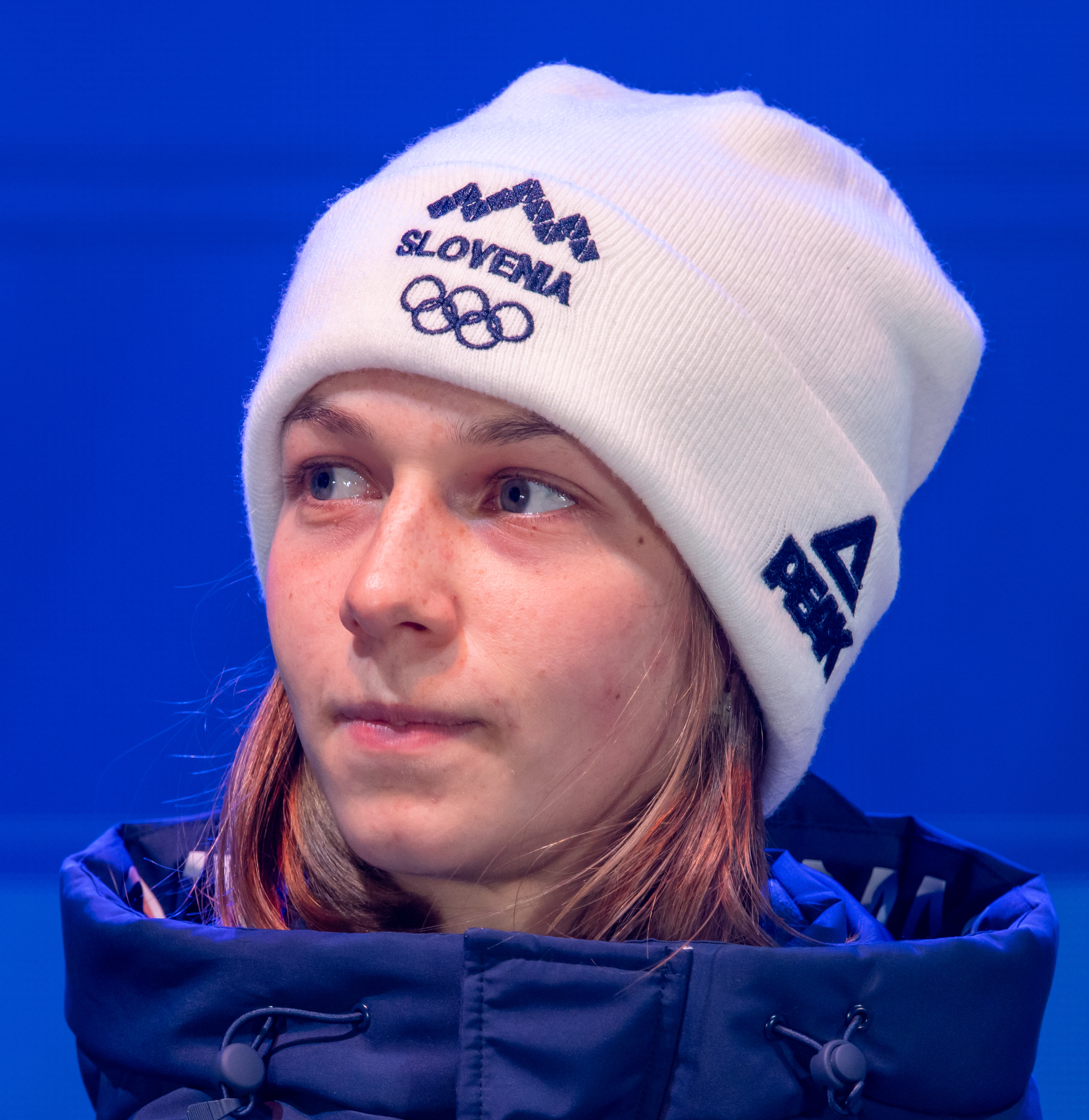
- Lena Repinc after the 2026 Winter Olympics

Personal information
- Born: 8 April 2003 (age 23) Jesenice, Slovenia

Sport

Professional information
- Sport: Biathlon
- Club: SD Bohinj
Medal record
Women's biathlon
Representing Slovenia
Junior World Championships
Bronze medal – third place	2024 Otepää	12.5 km individual
Youth World Championships
Gold medal – first place	2021 Obertilliach	6 km sprint
Gold medal – first place	2021 Obertilliach	7.5 km pursuit
Silver medal – second place	2021 Obertilliach	10 km individual
Silver medal – second place	2021 Obertilliach	3 × 6 km relay
Silver medal – second place	2022 Soldier Hollow	6 km sprint
Silver medal – second place	2022 Soldier Hollow	7.5 km pursuit

Lena Repinc (born 8 April 2003) is a Slovenian biathlete. She is a two-time Biathlon Youth World champion in Pursuit and Sprint. She competed at the 2020 Winter Youth Olympic Games in Lausanne, Switzerland.

== Biathlon results ==
All results are sourced from the International Biathlon Union.

=== Olympic Games ===
0 medals

Event	Individual	Sprint	Pursuit	Mass start	Relay	Mixed relay
(Italy) 2026 Milano Cortina	69th	21st	32nd	—	16th	13th

=== World Championships ===
0 medals

Event	Individual	Sprint	Pursuit	Mass start	Relay	Mixed relay	Single mixed relay
(Germany) 2023 Oberhof	52nd	—	—	—	12th	12th	—
(Czech Republic) 2024 Nové Město na Moravě	78th	30th	43rd	—	13th	—	—
(Switzerland) 2025 Lenzerheide	32nd	60th	53rd	—	8th	11th	6th

=== Youth Olympic Games ===
Event	Individual	Sprint
(Switzerland) 2020 Lausanne	52nd	22nd

=== Junior/Youth World Championships ===
7 medals (2 gold, 4 silver, 1 bronze)

Event	Individual	Sprint	Pursuit	Relay
(Slovakia) 2019 Osrblie	37th	21st	30th	5th
(Switzerland) 2020 Lenzerheide	16th	9th	6th	4th
(Austria) 2021 Obertilliach	Silver	Gold	Gold	Silver
(United States) 2022 Soldier Hollow	4th	Silver	Silver	6th
(Kazakhstan) 2023 Shchuchinsk	25th	6th	10th	4th
(Estonia) 2024 Otepää	Bronze	16th	13th	7th
