= Jeanne Richard =

French biathlete (born 2002)

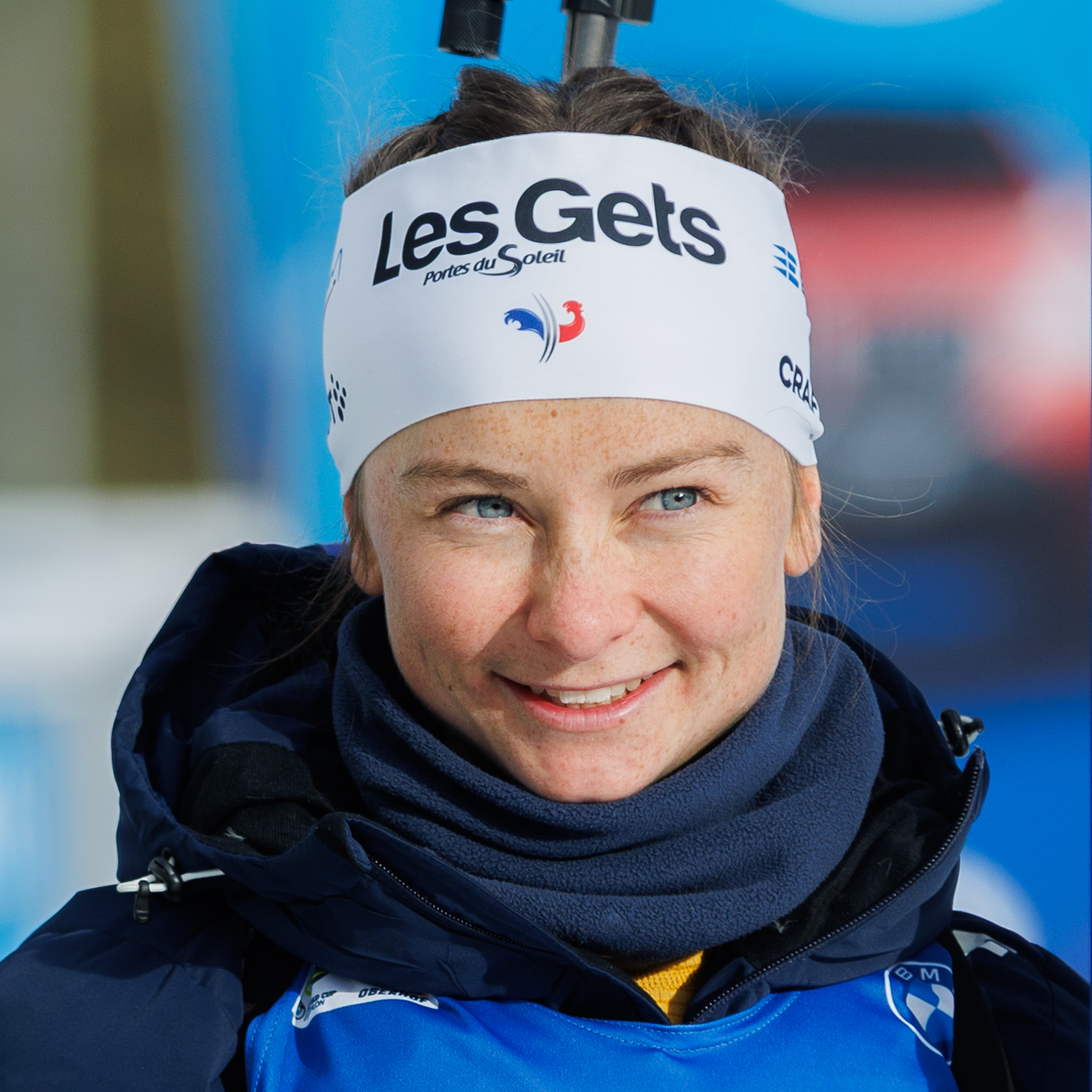
- Richard in 2025

Personal information
- Nationality: French
- Born: 13 April 2002 (age 24) Thonon-les-Bains, France

Sport

Professional information
- Sport: Biathlon
- Club: Les Gets
- IBU Cup debut: 2021
- World Cup debut: 2024

World Championships
- Teams: 1 (2024)

World Cup
- Seasons: 1 (2023/24-)
- All victories: 1
Medal record
Women's biathlon
Representing France
Youth Olympic Games
Gold medal – first place	2020 Lausanne	Single mixed relay
Silver medal – second place	2020 Lausanne	10 km individual
Junior World Championships
Silver medal – second place	2023 Shchuchinsk	7.5 km sprint
Silver medal – second place	2023 Shchuchinsk	10 km pursuit
Silver medal – second place	2023 Shchuchinsk	12.5 km individual
Silver medal – second place	2023 Shchuchinsk	4 × 6 km relay
Silver medal – second place	2023 Shchuchinsk	4 × 6 km W+M relay
Bronze medal – third place	2022 Soldier Hollow	4 × 6 km relay
Youth World Championships
Gold medal – first place	2021 Obertilliach	10 km individual
Gold medal – first place	2021 Obertilliach	3 × 6 km relay

Jeanne Richard (born 13 April 2002) is a French biathlete.

== Career ==
Richard participated at the 2020 Winter Youth Olympics in the biathlon competition, being awarded the silver medal in the girls' individual. Richard also participated in the single mixed relay event, winning the gold medal with her teammate Mathieu Garcia.

Richard participated at the Biathlon Junior World Championships 2021, being awarded the gold medal in the youth women's 10 km individual event. She also participated in the youth women's 3 × 6 km relay event, being awarded the gold medal with her teammates, Fany Bertrand and Maya Cloetens. Richard participated at the Biathlon Junior World Championships 2022 in the junior women's 4 × 6 km relay event, being awarded the bronze medal with her teammates Camille Coupé, Noémie Remonnay and Océane Michelon. In shooting, Jeanne Richard shoulder left.

== Biathlon results ==
All results are sourced from the International Biathlon Union.

=== World Championships ===
Event	Individual	Sprint	Pursuit	Mass start	Relay	Mixed relay	Single mixed relay
(Czech Republic) 2024 Nové Město	—	15th	18th	—	—	—	—
(Switzerland) 2025 Lenzerheide	23rd	28th	34th	4th	—	—	—

=== World Cup ===
World Cup rankings

Season	Overall	Individual	Sprint	Pursuit	Mass start
2023–24	39th	58th	31st	30th	—
2024–25	6th	10th	11th	4th	4th
2025–26	28th	32nd	26th	35th	30th

Relay victories

1 victory

No.	Season	Date	Location	Discipline	Level	Team
1	2023–24	10 January 2024	(Germany) Ruhpolding	Relay	Biathlon World Cup	Jeanmonnot / Richard / Chauveau / Simon
