= Biathlon World Championships 2023 – Women's pursuit =

Women's pursuit at the Biathlon World Championships 2023
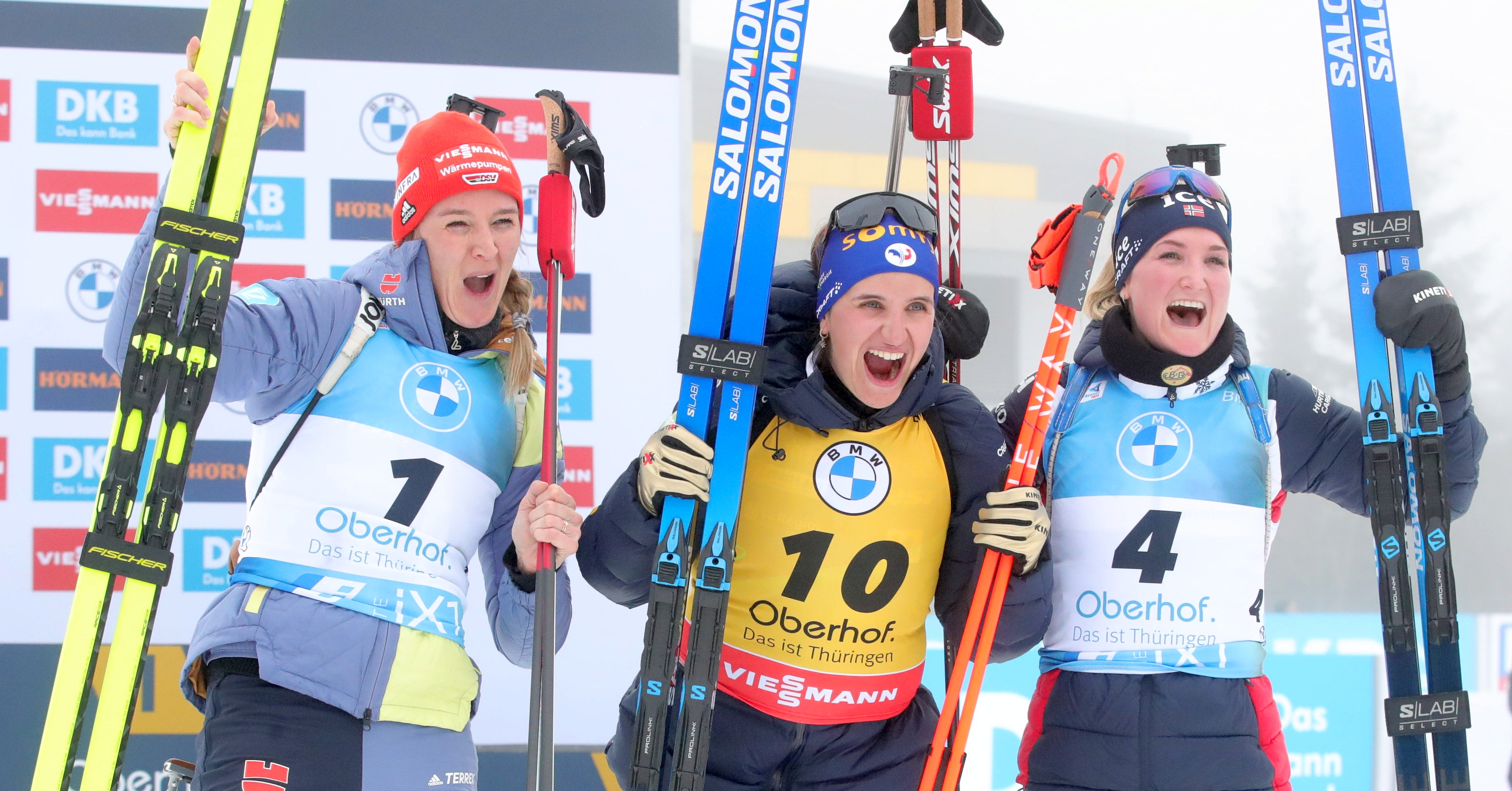
- Location: Oberhof, Germany
- Dates: 12 February
- Competitors: 57 from 21 nations
- Winning time: 32:00.8

Medalists
| gold medal | Julia Simon | France |
| silver medal | Denise Herrmann-Wick | Germany |
| bronze medal | Marte Olsbu Røiseland | Norway |

The women's 10 km pursuit competition at the Biathlon World Championships 2023 was held on 12 February 2023.

== Results ==
The race was started at 13:25.

| Rank | Bib | Name | Nationality | Start | Penalties (P+P+S+S) | Time | Deficit |
|---|---|---|---|---|---|---|---|
| 1st place, gold medalist(s) | 10 | Julia Simon | France | 1:03 | 1 (0+0+0+1) | 32:00.8 | |
| 2nd place, silver medalist(s) | 1 | Denise Herrmann-Wick | Germany | 0:00 | 4 (1+0+1+2) | 32:27.8 | +27.0 |
| 3rd place, bronze medalist(s) | 4 | Marte Olsbu Røiseland | Norway | 0:31 | 3 (1+1+1+0) | 32:38.5 | +37.7 |
| 4 | 14 | Ingrid Landmark Tandrevold | Norway | 1:11 | 3 (0+1+1+1) | 33:01.1 | +1:00.3 |
| 5 | 7 | Sophia Schneider | Germany | 0:58 | 4 (0+2+0+2) | 33:09.1 | +1:08.3 |
| 6 | 26 | Lou Jeanmonnot | France | 1:35 | 1 (0+0+1+0) | 33:09.5 | +1:08.7 |
| 7 | 18 | Tereza Voborníková | Czech Republic | 1:18 | 2 (1+1+0+0) | 33:13.7 | +1:12.9 |
| 8 | 17 | Hanna Kebinger | Germany | 1:16 | 2 (1+1+0+0) | 33:22.3 | +1:21.5 |
| 9 | 27 | Sophie Chauveau | France | 1:35 | 3 (0+0+2+1) | 33:24.4 | +1:23.6 |
| 10 | 3 | Linn Persson | Sweden | 0:26 | 3 (0+2+1+0) | 33:28.1 | +1:27.3 |
| 11 | 19 | Dorothea Wierer | Italy | 1:25 | 3 (1+1+1+0) | 33:30.0 | +1:29.2 |
| 12 | 2 | Hanna Öberg | Sweden | 0:02 | 5 (1+2+2+0) | 33:33.2 | +1:32.4 |
| 13 | 12 | Juni Arnekleiv | Norway | 1:05 | 2 (0+0+2+0) | 33:34.5 | +1:33.7 |
| 14 | 29 | Yuliia Dzhima | Ukraine | 1:40 | 1 (0+0+1+0) | 33:45.7 | +1:44.9 |
| 15 | 22 | Mona Brorsson | Sweden | 1:31 | 2 (0+0+1+1) | 34:00.3 | +1:59.5 |
| 16 | 6 | Markéta Davidová | Czech Republic | 0:51 | 5 (2+1+1+1) | 34:00.7 | +1.59.9 |
| 17 | 37 | Karoline Offigstad Knotten | Norway | 1:52 | 1 (0+0+1+0) | 34:07.5 | +2:06.7 |
| 18 | 9 | Anna Magnusson | Sweden | 0:59 | 4 (0+2+2+0) | 34:16.6 | +2:15.8 |
| 19 | 15 | Chloé Chevalier | France | 1:12 | 4 (1+1+2+0) | 34:17.4 | +2:16.6 |
| 20 | 23 | Janina Hettich-Walz | Germany | 1:33 | 3 (0+0+3+0) | 34:21.1 | +2:20.3 |
| 21 | 36 | Ragnhild Femsteinevik | Norway | 1:52 | 4 (0+1+2+1) | 34:34.4 | +2:33.6 |
| 22 | 8 | Polona Klemenčič | Slovenia | 0:58 | 4 (1+2+1+0) | 34:44.5 | +2:43.7 |
| 23 | 24 | Anaïs Chevalier-Bouchet | France | 1:33 | 5 (1+2+1+1) | 34:48.4 | +2:47.6 |
| 24 | 35 | Suvi Minkkinen | Finland | 1:50 | 3 (0+0+2+1) | 34:56.7 | +2:55.9 |
| 25 | 25 | Paulína Bátovská Fialková | Slovakia | 1:34 | 5 (1+3+1+0) | 35:09.3 | +3:08.5 |
| 26 | 39 | Amy Baserga | Switzerland | 2:00 | 2 (1+1+0+0) | 35:15.4 | +3:14.6 |
| 27 | 13 | Lisa Theresa Hauser | Austria | 1:09 | 7 (1+1+2+3) | 35:24.2 | +3:23.4 |
| 28 | 50 | Elisa Gasparin | Switzerland | 2:25 | 3 (0+1+1+1) | 35:28.0 | +3:27.2 |
| 29 | 49 | Anna Gandler | Austria | 2:24 | 2 (0+1+0+1) | 35:37.0 | +3:36.2 |
| 30 | 11 | Emma Lunder | Canada | 1:04 | 7 (1+2+2+2) | 35:42.6 | +3:41.8 |
| 31 | 31 | Milena Todorova | Bulgaria | 1:45 | 6 (1+2+2+1) | 35:49.3 | +3:48.5 |
| 32 | 33 | Hannah Auchentaller | Italy | 1:46 | 5 (2+0+1+2) | 35:55.8 | +3:55.0 |
| 33 | 28 | Lena Häcki-Gross | Switzerland | 1:40 | 7 (3+2+1+1) | 36:04.7 | +4:03.9 |
| 34 | 40 | Tuuli Tomingas | Estonia | 2:02 | 3 (2+0+1+0) | 36:09.6 | +4:08.8 |
| 35 | 21 | Lotte Lie | Belgium | 1:31 | 3 (1+2+0+0) | 36:16.5 | +4:15.7 |
| 36 | 42 | Ida Lien | Norway | 2:07 | 7 (2+1+2+2) | 36:22.3 | +4:21.5 |
| 37 | 48 | Nadia Moser | Canada | 2:23 | 3 (0+1+1+1) | 36:25.4 | +4:24.6 |
| 38 | 20 | Aita Gasparin | Switzerland | 1:27 | 4 (2+0+0+2) | 36:28.0 | +4:27.2 |
| 39 | 60 | Susan Külm | Estonia | 2:56 | 1 (1+0+0+0) | 36:31.7 | +4:30.9 |
| 40 | 38 | Maya Cloetens | Belgium | 1:52 | 3 (0+0+2+1) | 36:37.0 | +4:36.2 |
| 41 | 59 | Lucie Charvátová | Czech Republic | 2:55 | 6 (2+2+1+1) | 36:37.2 | +4:36.4 |
| 42 | 46 | Samuela Comola | Italy | 2:21 | 5 (0+2+2+1) | 36:37.2 | +4:36.4 |
| 43 | 45 | Dunja Zdouc | Austria | 2:19 | 2 (1+0+1+0) | 36:38.1 | +4:37.3 |
| 44 | 47 | Ivona Fialková | Slovakia | 2:22 | 6 (0+3+2+1) | 36:41.0 | +4:40.2 |
| 45 | 34 | Rebecca Passler | Italy | 1:49 | 6 (2+2+1+1) | 36:45.7 | +4:44.9 |
| 46 | 41 | Vanessa Voigt | Germany | 2:06 | 5 (2+1+1+1) | 36:50.5 | +4:49.7 |
| 47 | 32 | Anastasia Tolmacheva | Romania | 1:46 | 4 (0+1+0+3) | 36:53.9 | +4:53.1 |
| 48 | 43 | Olena Bilosiuk | Ukraine | 2:15 | 4 (0+1+1+2) | 36:57.6 | +4:56.8 |
| 49 | 44 | Anastasiya Merkushyna | Ukraine | 2:17 | 2 (1+1+0+0) | 36:57.9 | +4:57.1 |
| 50 | 51 | Joanna Jakieła | Poland | 2:28 | 4 (2+0+0+2) | 37:16.7 | +5:15.9 |
| 51 | 58 | Anamarija Lampič | Slovenia | 2:47 | 7 (2+0+2+3) | 37:17.7 | +5:16.9 |
| 52 | 56 | Kamila Żuk | Poland | 2:44 | 4 (0+3+0+1) | 37:58.7 | +5:57.9 |
| 53 | 30 | Ekaterina Avvakumova | South Korea | 1:43 | 8 (3+3+2+0) | 38:01.6 | +6:00.8 |
| 54 | 53 | Gabrielė Leščinskaitė | Lithuania | 2:36 | 3 (1+0+0+2) | 38:17.2 | +6:16.4 |
| 55 | 54 | Anna Mąka | Poland | 2:36 | 6 (1+1+1+3) | 38:26.5 | +6:25.7 |
| 56 | 52 | Natalija Kočergina | Lithuania | 2:32 | 6 (1+3+1+1) | 38:27.5 | +6:26.7 |
| 57 | 55 | Deedra Irwin | United States | 2:39 | 5 (3+1+1+0) | 38:32.4 | +6:31.6 |
| | 5 | Lisa Vittozzi | Italy | 0:46 | Did not start | | |
| | 16 | Elvira Öberg | Sweden | 1:14 | Did not start | | |
| | 57 | Ukaleq Slettemark | Greenland | 2:44 | Did not start | | |
