= Biathlon World Championships 2023 – Women's individual =

Women's individual at the Biathlon World Championships 2023
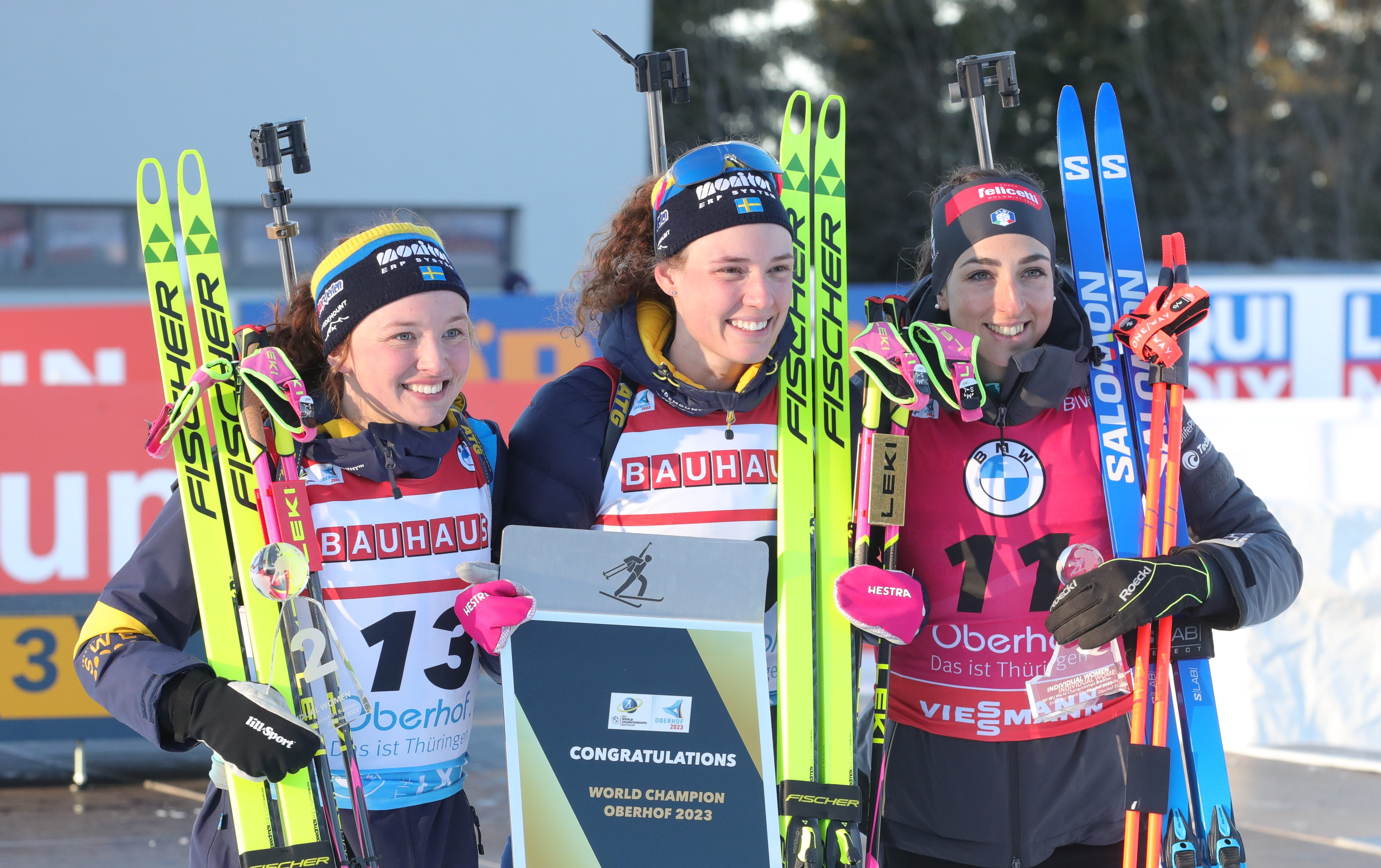
- Location: Oberhof, Germany
- Dates: 15 February
- Competitors: 90 from 29 nations
- Winning time: 43:36.1

Medalists
gold medal	Hanna Öberg	Sweden
silver medal	Linn Persson	Sweden
bronze medal	Lisa Vittozzi	Italy

The women's 15 km individual competition at the Biathlon World Championships 2023 was held on 15 February 2023.

== Results ==
The race was started at 14:30.

Rank	Bib	Name	Nationality	Penalties (P+S)	Time	Deficit
1st place, gold medalist(s)	20	Hanna Öberg	Sweden	1 (1+0+0+0)	43:36.1	—
2nd place, silver medalist(s)	13	Linn Persson	Sweden	0 (0+0+0+0)	43:46.4	+10.3
3rd place, bronze medalist(s)	11	Lisa Vittozzi	Italy	1 (0+0+0+1)	44:04.1	+28.0
4	18	Samuela Comola	Italy	0 (0+0+0+0)	44:24.6	+48.5
5	6	Julia Simon	France	3 (1+0+1+1)	44:57.8	+1:21.7
6	26	Tuuli Tomingas	Estonia	2 (0+1+1+0)	45:59.4	+2:23.3
7	15	Lou Jeanmonnot	France	2 (1+0+0+1)	46:10.0	+2:33.9
8	43	Suvi Minkkinen	Finland	0 (0+0+0+0)	46:20.0	+2:43.9
9	19	Lena Häcki	Switzerland	3 (1+2+0+0)	46:20.5	+2:44.4
10	2	Markéta Davidová	Czech Republic	3 (1+1+1+0)	46:37.4	+3:01.3
11	9	Ingrid Landmark Tandrevold	Norway	4 (1+3+0+0)	46:47.0	+3:10.9
12	17	Anais Chevalier-Bouchet	France	4 (1+1+1+1)	46:50.6	+3:14.5
13	16	Sophia Schneider	Germany	4 (1+1+1+1)	46:53.7	+3:17.6
14	51	Dunja Zdouc	Austria	1 (0+0+1+0)	46:55.3	+3:19.2
15	31	Denise Herrmann-Wick	Germany	4 (0+2+0+2)	47:01.2	+3:25.1
15	4	Dorothea Wierer	Italy	4 (1+0+0+3)	47:01.2	+3:25.1
17	82	Ida Lien	Norway	3 (1+1+0+1)	47:03.6	+3:27.5
18	25	Paulína Fialková	Slovakia	3 (1+0+1+1)	47:05.9	+3:29.8
19	23	Vanessa Voigt	Germany	2 (1+0+1+0)	47:06.0	+3:29.9
20	24	Deedra Irwin	United States	1 (0+1+0+0)	47:10.6	+3:34.5
21	36	Karoline Offigstad Knotten	Norway	2 (1+1+0+0)	47:21.7	+3:45.6
22	39	Hannah Auchentaller	Italy	2 (0+1+0+1)	47:27.2	+3:51.1
23	21	Fuyuko Tachizaki	Japan	2 (0+1+0+1)	47:29.6	+3:53.5
24	8	Anna Gandler	Austria	3 (1+1+1+0)	47:30.8	+3:54.7
25	27	Emma Lunder	Canada	3 (1+1+0+1)	47:31.2	+3:55.1
26	70	Caroline Colombo	France	3 (1+1+0+1)	47:39.5	+4:03.4
27	54	Aita Gasparin	Switzerland	2 (2+0+0+0)	47:40.0	+4:03.9
28	73	Rebecca Passler	Italy	2 (0+2+0+0)	47:44.5	+4:08.4
29	41	Mona Brorsson	Sweden	3 (0+2+0+1)	48:27.6	+4:51.5
30	62	Hanna Kebinger	Germany	4 (0+1+0+3)	48:34.2	+4:58.1
31	77	Anna Maka	Poland	2 (0+0+1+1)	48:34.5	+4:58.4
32	35	Lisa Theresa Hauser	Austria	4 (1+3+0+0)	48:39.2	+5:03.1
33	49	Chloé Chevalier	France	5 (0+1+2+2)	48:45.4	+5:09.3
34	90	Tereza Vinklárková	Czech Republic	2 (1+0+0+1)	48:47.8	+5:11.7
35	28	Anna Magnusson	Sweden	3 (2+1+0+0)	48:57.9	+5:21.8
36	32	Milena Todorova	Bulgaria	5 (1+1+0+3)	49:05.4	+5:29.3
37	80	Eliška Václavíková	Czech Republic	2 (1+1+0+0)	49:15.3	+5:39.2
38	94	Amy Baserga	Switzerland	3 (0+2+1+0)	49:18.4	+5:42.3
39	46	Lucie Charvátová	Czech Republic	5 (1+2+1+1)	49:18.6	+5:42.5
40	30	Yuliia Dzhima	Ukraine	5 (0+3+1+1)	49:21.6	+5:45.5
41	12	Alina Stremous	Moldova	3 (1+1+1+0)	49:31.5	+5:55.4
42	68	Janina Hettich-Walz	Germany	5 (0+1+1+3)	49:33.7	+5:57.6
43	92	Tamara Steiner	Austria	2 (0+1+0+1)	49:44.4	+6:08.3
44	14	Baiba Bendika	Latvia	6 (1+2+2+1)	49:53.1	+6:17.0
45	22	Tereza Voborníková	Czech Republic	5 (1+1+3+0)	50:00.4	+6:24.3
46	1	Polona Klemenčič	Slovenia	6 (1+2+1+2)	50:08.1	+6:32.0
47	71	Gabrielė Leščinskaitė	Lithuania	2 (0+1+0+1)	50:08.3	+6:32.2
48	29	Ekaterina Avvakumova	South Korea	5 (0+1+4+0)	50:13.1	+6:37.0
49	57	Mária Remeňová	Slovakia	2 (0+1+0+1)	50:19.7	+6:43.6
50	34	Kamila Zuk	Poland	5 (3+0+2+0)	50:32.4	+6:56.3
51	5	Anastasia Tolmacheva	Romania	4 (0+0+2+2)	50:34.1	+6:58.0
52	61	Lena Repinc	Slovenia	5 (2+1+1+1)	50:39.3	+7:03.2
53	66	Elisa Gasparin	Switzerland	6 (1+4+0+1)	50:50.7	+7:14.6
54	87	Erika Janka	Finland	3 (0+1+0+2)	50:53.3	+7:17.2
55	45	Ragnhild Femsteinevik	Norway	7 (3+1+1+2)	51:02.1	+7:26.0
56	93	Natalia Sidorowicz	Poland	3 (2+1+0+0)	51:04.7	+7:28.6
57	75	Anna Juppe	Austria	5 (0+3+1+1)	51:06.2	+7:30.1
58	37	Nadia Moser	Canada	5 (0+2+2+1)	51:37.0	+8:00.9
59	47	Susan Külm	Estonia	6 (1+2+2+1)	51:52.0	+8:15.9
60	64	Nastassia Kinnunen	Finland	6 (0+1+0+5)	52:09.6	+8:33.5
61	56	Joanne Reid	United States	6 (0+3+2+1)	52:13.4	+8:37.3
62	33	Mari Eder	Finland	8 (2+2+2+2)	52:21.6	+8:45.5
63	38	Chu Yuanmeng	China	3 (2+0+0+1)	52:28.3	+8:52.2
64	48	Ko Eun-jung	South Korea	3 (0+1+1+1)	52:28.7	+8:52.6
65	3	Ivona Fialková	Slovakia	7 (1+4+1+1))	52:48.1	+9:12.0
66	44	Anastassiya Kondratyeva	Kazakhstan	2 (0+0+2+0)	52:48.3	+9:12.2
67	85	Kelsey Joan Dickinson	United States	2 (1+1+0+0)	52:58.0	+9:21.9
68	81	Chloe Levins	United States	4 (1+2+1+0)	53:08.9	+9:32.8
69	69	Benita Peiffer	Canada	4 (1+2+1+0)	53:12.6	+9:36.5
70	10	Lotte Lie	Belgium	5 (0+3+0+2)	53:42.0	+10:05.9
71	58	Joanna Jakiela	Poland	7 (0+4+2+1)	53:42.4	+10:06.3
72	59	Daniela Kadeva	Bulgaria	3 (1+0+1+1)	53:48.5	+10:12.4
73	83	Regina Ermits	Estonia	7 (1+0+2+4)	53:49.1	+10:13.0
74	53	Darcie Morton	Australia	4 (0+0+2+2)	53:54.8	+10:18.7
75	78	Zuzana Remeňová	Slovakia	6 (2+1+2+1)	54:08.4	+10:32.3
76	65	Lyudmila Akhatova	Kazakhstan	5 (2+0+1+2)	54:25.9	+10:49.8
77	91	Johanna Talihärm	Estonia	8 (3+2+1+2)	54:28.1	+10:52.0
78	40	Asuka Hachisuka	Japan	5 (2+1+0+2)	54:40.6	+11:04.5
79	88	Juni Arnekleiv	Norway	8 (2+2+2+2)	54:48.3	+11:12.2
80	52	Natalija Kočergina	Lithuania	6 (0+2+2+2)	55:13.6	+11:37.5
81	72	Hikaru Fukuda	Japan	4 (0+2+0+2)	55:51.7	+12:15.6
82	50	Liubov Kypiachenkova	Ukraine	8 (0+3+1+4)	56:04.4	+12:28.3
83	76	Živa Klemenčič	Slovenia	8 (0+5+0+3)	56:19.5	+12:43.4
84	74	Wen Ying	China	5 (1+2+0+2)	56:34.2	+12:58.1
85	79	Anna Kryvonos	Ukraine	6 (0+4+1+1)	56:53.4	+13:17.3
86	55	Anika Kožica	Croatia	9 (1+2+3+3)	56:54.2	+13:18.1
87	89	Anna Weidel	Germany	8 (2+0+4+2)	57:49.3	+14:13.2
88	7	Ukaleq Astri Slettemark	Greenland	8 (2+3+1+2)	57:55.4	+14:19.3
89	84	Elena Chirkova	Romania	10 (4+2+3+1)	58:25.9	+14:49.8
90	67	Maria Zdravkova	Bulgaria	12 (2+3+3+4)	1:04:11.3	+20:35.2
	42	Natalia Ushkina	Romania	Did not start		
	60	Elvira Öberg	Sweden	Did not start		
	63	Alla Ghilenko	Moldova	Did not start		
	86	Anastasiya Merkushyna	Ukraine	Did not start		
