= Biathlon World Championships 2023 – Women's sprint =

Women's sprint at the Biathlon World Championships 2023
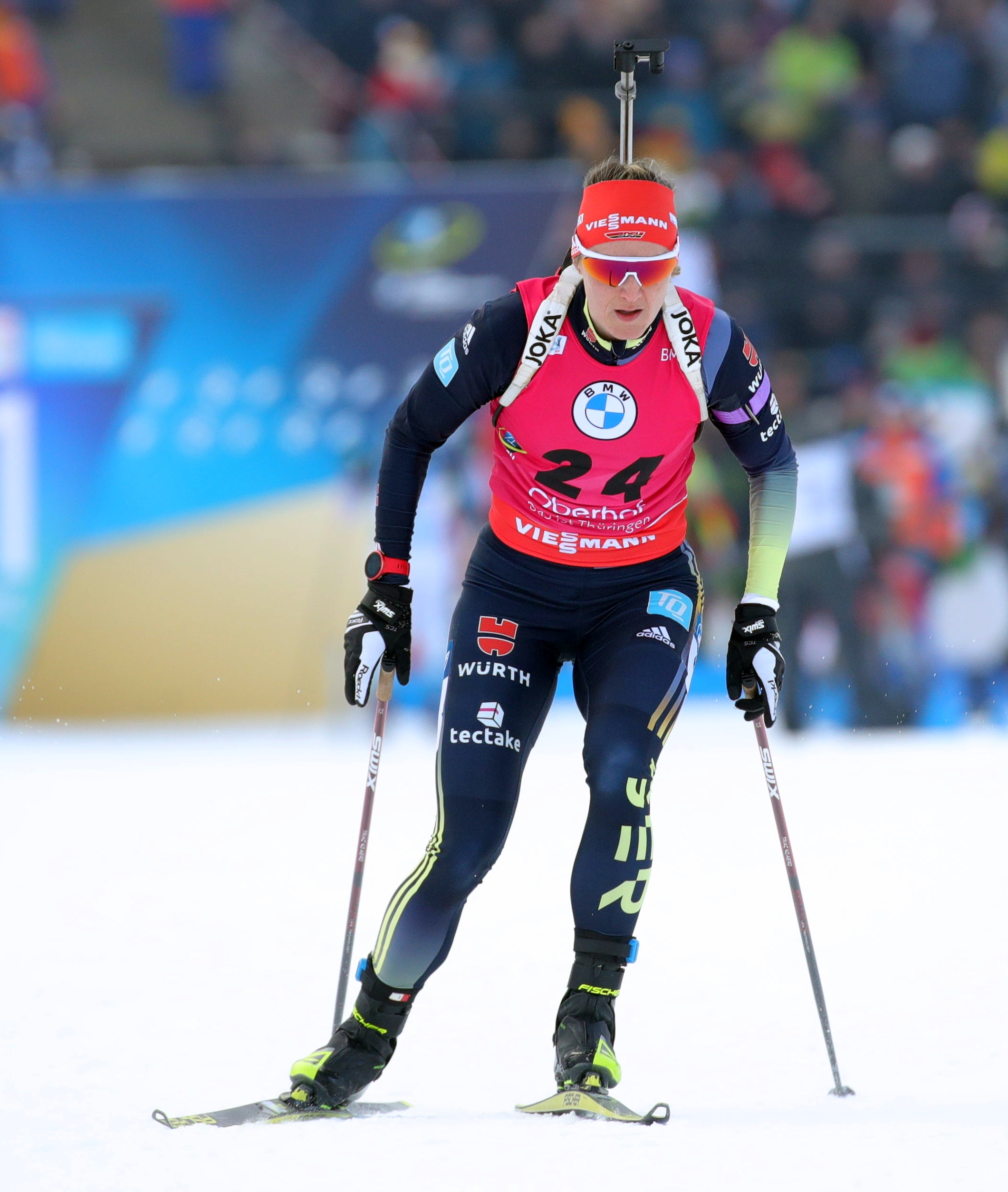
- Denise Herrmann-Wick, World champion
- Location: Oberhof, Germany
- Dates: 10 February
- Competitors: 96 from 29 nations
- Winning time: 21:19.7

Medalists
gold medal	Denise Herrmann-Wick	Germany
silver medal	Hanna Öberg	Sweden
bronze medal	Linn Persson	Sweden

The women's 7.5 km sprint competition at the Biathlon World Championships 2023 was held on 10 February 2023.

== Results ==
The race was started at 14:30.

Rank	Bib	Name	Nationality	Penalties (P+S)	Time	Deficit
1st place, gold medalist(s)	24	Denise Herrmann-Wick	Germany	0 (0+0)	21:19.7	
2nd place, silver medalist(s)	28	Hanna Öberg	Sweden	0 (0+0)	21:21.9	+2.2
3rd place, bronze medalist(s)	50	Linn Persson	Sweden	0 (0+0)	21:45.9	+26.2
4	30	Marte Olsbu Røiseland	Norway	1 (1+0)	21:51.0	+31.3
5	17	Lisa Vittozzi	Italy	1 (0+1)	22:05.5	+45.8
6	3	Markéta Davidová	Czech Republic	0 (0+0)	22:10.2	+50.5
7	34	Sophia Schneider	Germany	1 (0+1)	22:17.3	+57.6
8	52	Polona Klemenčič	Slovenia	0 (0+0)	22:17.8	+58.1
9	33	Anna Magnusson	Sweden	0 (0+0)	22:18.5	+58.8
10	11	Julia Simon	France	2 (0+2)	22:22.5	+1:02.8
11	29	Emma Lunder	Canada	1 (1+0)	22:23.4	+1:03.7
12	89	Juni Arnekleiv	Norway	0 (0+0)	22:24.2	+1:04.5
13	20	Lisa Theresa Hauser	Austria	0 (0+0)	22:28.4	+1:08.7
14	31	Ingrid Landmark Tandrevold	Norway	2 (0+2)	22:30.2	+1:10.5
15	54	Chloé Chevalier	France	1 (0+1)	22:31.5	+1:11.8
16	8	Elvira Öberg	Sweden	2 (1+1)	22:33.3	+1:13.6
17	74	Hanna Kebinger	Germany	1 (0+1)	22:35.6	+1:15.9
18	18	Tereza Voborníková	Czech Republic	1 (0+1)	22:37.2	+1:17.5
19	13	Dorothea Wierer	Italy	2 (1+1)	22:44.8	+1:25.1
20	58	Aita Gasparin	Switzerland	0 (0+0)	22:46.2	+1:26.5
21	32	Lotte Lie	Belgium	0 (0+0)	22:50.2	+1:30.5
22	36	Mona Brorsson	Sweden	0 (0+0)	22:50.8	+1:31.1
23	9	Janina Hettich-Walz	Germany	1 (0+1)	22:52.8	+1:33.1
24	22	Anaïs Chevalier-Bouchet	France	2 (2+0)	22:52.9	+1:33.2
25	5	Paulína Fialková	Slovakia	2 (0+2)	22:54.1	+1:34.4
26	15	Lou Jeanmonnot	France	1 (1+0)	22:54.8	+1:35.1
27	76	Sophie Chauveau	France	2 (0+2)	22:55.0	+1:35.3
28	6	Lena Häcki	Switzerland	2 (1+1)	22:59.2	+1:39.5
29	62	Yuliia Dzhima	Ukraine	1 (0+1)	23:00.0	+1:40.3
30	61	Ekaterina Avvakumova	South Korea	2 (2+0)	23:02.9	+1:43.2
31	7	Milena Todorova	Bulgaria	2 (0+2)	23:04.8	+1:45.1
32	43	Anastasia Tolmacheva	Romania	1 (0+1)	23:05.3	+1:45.6
33	63	Hannah Auchentaller	Italy	1 (1+0)	23:05.9	+1:46.2
34	41	Rebecca Passler	Italy	1 (0+1)	23:08.2	+1:48.5
35	48	Suvi Minkkinen	Finland	1 (1+0)	23:09.9	+1:50.2
36	38	Ragnhild Femsteinevik	Norway	2 (1+1)	23:11.8	+1:52.1
37	12	Karoline Offigstad Knotten	Norway	2 (0+2)	23:12.0	+1:52.3
38	57	Maya Cloetens	Belgium	0 (0+0)	23:12.1	+1:52.4
39	93	Amy Baserga	Switzerland	0 (0+0)	23:20.1	+2:00.4
40	21	Tuuli Tomingas	Estonia	1 (0+1)	23:21.4	+2:01.7
41	26	Vanessa Voigt	Germany	2 (0+2)	23:25.4	+2:05.7
42	84	Ida Lien	Norway	3 (2+1)	23:26.2	+2:06.5
43	69	Olena Bilosiuk	Ukraine	1 (0+1)	23:35.0	+2:15.3
44	16	Anastasiya Merkushyna	Ukraine	2 (2+0)	23:37.1	+2:17.4
45	23	Dunja Zdouc	Austria	2 (1+1)	23:38.4	+2:18.7
46	14	Samuela Comola	Italy	2 (0+2)	23:41.0	+2:22.1
47	42	Ivona Fialková	Slovakia	3 (2+1)	23:41.8	+2:22.1
48	56	Nadia Moser	Canada	1 (0+1)	23:43.1	+2:23.4
49	44	Anna Gandler	Austria	3 (1+2)	23:43.3	+2:23.6
50	65	Elisa Gasparin	Switzerland	2 (0+2)	23:44.3	+2:24.6
51	46	Joanna Jakieła	Poland	2 (0+2)	23:47.5	+2:27.8
52	66	Natalija Kočergina	Lithuania	1 (0+1)	23:51.6	+2:31.9
53	55	Gabrielė Leščinskaitė	Lithuania	0 (0+0)	23:55.2	+2:35.5
54	88	Anna Mąka	Poland	1 (0+1)	23:55.9	+2:36.3
55	10	Deedra Irwin	United States	2 (1+1)	23:58.5	+2:38.8
56	4	Kamila Żuk	Poland	3 (1+2)	24:03.7	+2:44.0
56	25	Ukaleq Astri Slettemark	Greenland	1 (1+0)	24:03.7	+2:44.0
58	2	Anamarija Lampič	Slovenia	4 (0+4)	24:06.2	+2:46.5
59	47	Lucie Charvátová	Czech Republic	4 (2+2)	24:14.5	+2:54.8
60	51	Susan Külm	Estonia	3 (2+1)	24:16.1	+2:56.4
61	67	Nastassia Kinnunen	Finland	4 (2+2)	24:18.7	+2:59.0
62	19	Baiba Bendika	Latvia	4 (2+2)	24:22.3	+3:02.6
63	60	Alina Stremous	Moldova	4 (0+4)	24:22.6	+3:02.9
64	92	Regina Ermits	Estonia	2 (2+0)	24:22.8	+3:03.1
65	71	Eliška Václavíková	Czech Republic	2 (1+1)	24:23.1	+3:03.4
66	53	Anika Kožica	Croatia	1 (1+0)	24:23.3	+3:03.6
67	37	Valentina Dimitrova	Bulgaria	2 (1+1)	24:23.6	+3:03.9
68	27	Fuyuko Tachizaki	Japan	3 (0+3)	24:23.7	+3:04.0
69	1	Mari Eder	Finland	5 (2+3)	24:27.8	+3:08.1
70	78	Mária Remenová	Slovakia	2 (1+1)	24:30.1	+3:10.4
71	49	Sanita Buliņa	Latvia	3 (2+1)	24:32.3	+3:12.6
72	81	Anna Juppe	Austria	4 (1+3)	24:34.7	+3:15.0
73	79	Chloe Levins	United States	1 (0+1)	24:36.2	+3:16.5
74	83	Natalia Sidorowicz	Poland	2 (0+2)	24:40.3	+3:20.6
75	45	Joanne Reid	United States	3 (0+3)	24:41.5	+3:21.8
76	39	Anastassiya Kondratyeva	Kazakhstan	0 (0+0)	24:53.5	+3:33.8
77	82	Alla Ghilenko	Moldova	2 (0+2)	25:00.0	+3:40.3
78	75	Lora Hristova	Bulgaria	3 (0+3)	25:00.5	+3:40.8
79	94	Natalia Ushkina	Romania	1 (0+1)	25:00.8	+3:41.1
80	87	Tamara Steiner	Austria	3 (0+3)	25:06.6	+3:46.9
81	73	Lyudmila Akhatova	Kazakhstan	2 (2+0)	25:15.0	+3:55.3
82	85	Elena Chirkova	Romania	3 (2+1)	25:17.7	+3:58.0
83	40	Chu Yuanmeng	China	1 (0+1)	25:18.6	+3:58.9
84	91	Darya Blashko	Ukraine	0 (0+0)	25:20.4	+4:00.7
85	86	Tereza Vinklárková	Czech Republic	2 (1+1)	25:26.3	+4:06.6
86	90	Tara Geraghty-Moats	United States	4 (0+4)	25:35.0	+4:15.3
87	59	Asuka Hachisuka	Japan	2 (2+0)	25:35.1	+4:15.4
88	80	Živa Klemenčič	Slovenia	4 (3+1)	25:46.9	+4:27.2
89	72	Wen Ying	China	3 (2+1)	25:50.3	+4:30.6
90	77	Ko Eun-jung	South Korea	3 (1+2)	25:51.3	+4:31.6
91	70	Johanna Talihärm	Estonia	6 (3+3)	26:07.3	+4:47.6
92	68	Aoi Sato	Japan	5 (3+2)	26:15.9	+4:56.2
93	64	Benita Pfeiffer	Canada	5 (2+3)	26:29.9	+5:10.2
94	35	Darcie Morton	Australia	4 (2+2)	26:45.8	+5:26.1
95	95	Júlia Machyniaková	Slovakia	3 (1+2)	27:03.3	+5:43.6
	96	Venla Lehtonen	Finland	0 (0+0)	Did not finish	
