= Biathlon World Championships 2023 – Women's relay =

Women's relay at the Biathlon World Championships 2023
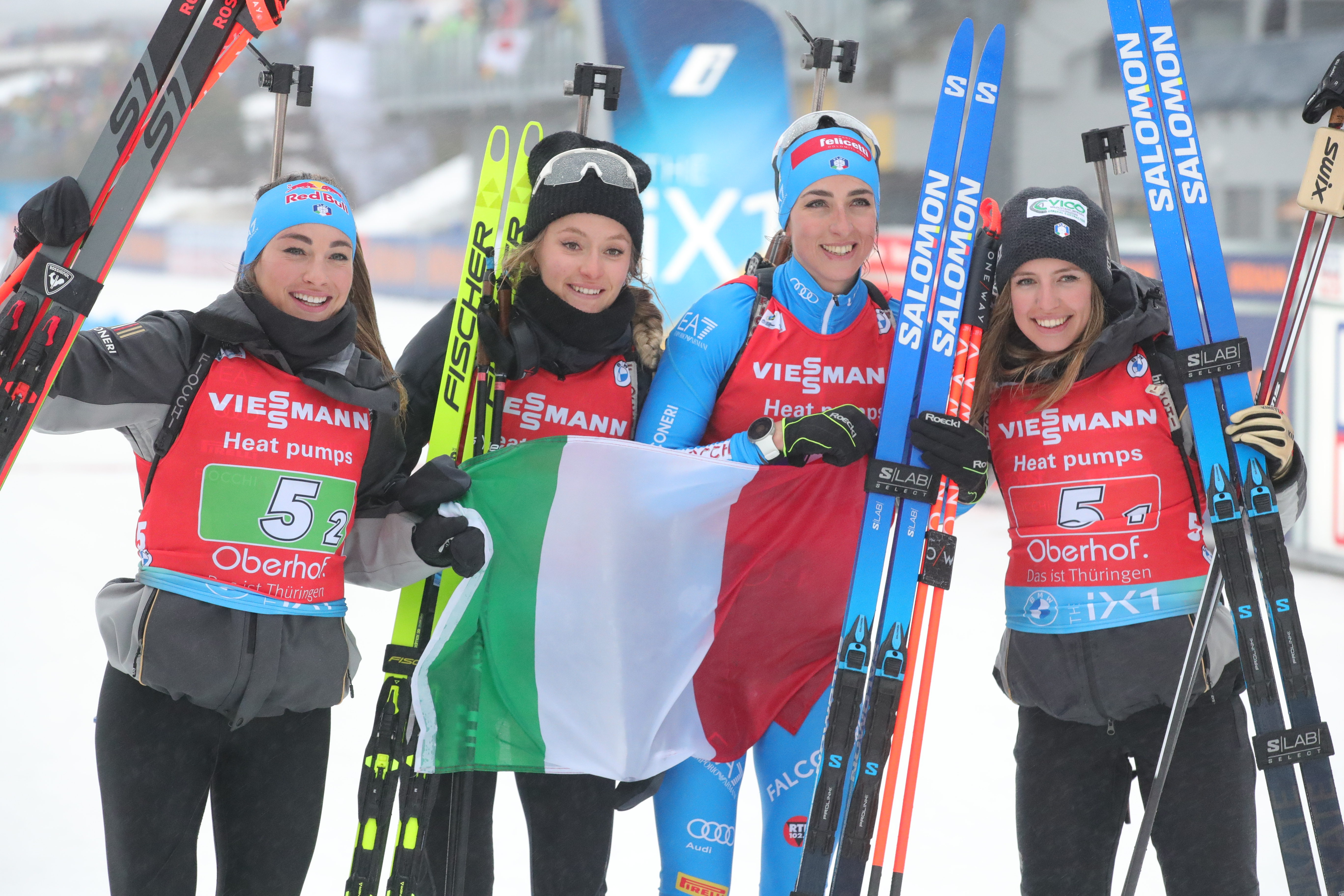
- Location: Oberhof, Germany
- Dates: 18 February
- Competitors: 64 from 16 nations
- Teams: 16
- Winning time: 1:14:39.7

Medalists
gold medal	Samuela Comola; Dorothea Wierer; Hannah Auchentaller; Lisa Vittozzi	Italy
silver medal	Vanessa Voigt; Hanna Kebinger; Sophia Schneider; Denise Herrmann-Wick	Germany
bronze medal	Linn Persson; Anna Magnusson; Elvira Öberg; Hanna Öberg	Sweden

The women's 4 × 6 km relay competition at the Biathlon World Championships 2023 was held on 18 February 2023.

== Results ==
The race was started at 15:00.

Rank	Bib	Team	Time	Penalties (P+S)	Deficit
1st place, gold medalist(s)	5	Italy Samuela Comola; Dorothea Wierer; Hannah Auchentaller; Lisa Vittozzi	1:14:39.7; 18:08.8; 18:43.2; 19:27.0; 18:20.7	0+0 0+2; 0+0 0+0; 0+0 0+1; 0+0 0+1; 0+0 0+0	
2nd place, silver medalist(s)	3	Germany Vanessa Voigt; Hanna Kebinger; Sophia Schneider; Denise Herrmann-Wick	1:15:04.4; 18:15.9; 19:18.9; 18:49.8; 18:39.8	0+3 0+3; 0+0 0+0; 0+2 0+0; 0+1 0+2; 0+0 0+1	+24.7
3rd place, bronze medalist(s)	1	Sweden Linn Persson; Anna Magnusson; Elvira Öberg; Hanna Öberg	1:15:34.4; 18:03.1; 19:42.8; 19:11.3; 18:38.2	0+6 2+5; 0+2 0+0; 0+1 2+3; 0+1 0+2; 0+2 0+0	+55.7
4	2	France Lou Jeanmonnot; Anais Chevalier-Bouchet; Chloé Chevalier; Julia Simon	1:16:11.3; 18:17.1; 18:56.3; 19:50.0; 19:07.9	0+4 1+8; 0+0 0+3; 0+0 1+3; 0+3 0+2; 0+1 0+0	+1:31.6
5	8	Austria Dunja Zdouc; Anna Gandler; Anna Juppe; Lisa Theresa Hauser	1:16:47.7; 18:49.9; 19:18.0; 19:55.2; 18:44.6	0+6 0+6; 0+1 0+3; 0+1 0+2; 0+3 0+1; 0+1 0+0	+2:08.0
6	4	Norway Karoline Offigstad Knotten; Ingrid Landmark Tandrevold; Ida Lien; Marte Olsbu Røiseland	1:17:00.6; 18:08.1; 19:52.8; 20:07.0; 18:52.7	0+4 4+9; 0+1 0+2; 0+1 3+3; 0+1 1+3; 0+1 0+1	+2:20.9
7	7	Czech Republic Tereza Voborníková; Tereza Vinklárková; Markéta Davidová; Lucie Charvátová	1:17:24.8; 18:03.6; 19:53.1; 19:06.1; 20:22.0	2+6 1+5; 0+1 0+0; 0+2 0+0; 0+0 1+3; 2+3 0+2	+2:45.1
8	6	Switzerland Amy Baserga; Aita Gasparin; Elisa Gasparin; Lena Häcki	1:17:25.3; 18:42.1; 19:35.7; 19:49.2; 19:18.3	0+6 1+9; 0+0 0+3; 0+1 0+1; 0+3 0+2; 0+2 1+3	+2:45.6
9	14	Poland Anna Mąka; Kamila Żuk; Joanna Jakiela; Natalia Sidorowicz	1:19:28.6; 19:01.0; 19:35.8; 20:06.9; 20:44.9	0+7 0+9; 0+0 0+2; 0+3 0+2; 0+2 0+3; 0+2 0+2	+4:48.9
10	10	Estonia Regina Ermits; Tuuli Tomingas; Susan Külm; Johanna Talihärm	1:20:00.5; 20:39.4; 19:57.9; 20:22.1; 19:01.1	2+4 2+7; 2+3 0+1; 0+0 1+3; 0+1 1+3; 0+0 0+0	+5:20.8
11	11	Canada Nadia Moser; Emily Dickson; Benita Peiffer; Emma Lunder	1:20:03.4; 18:49.5; 21:40.8; 20:19.5; 19:13.6	0+2 1+8; 0+0 0+2; 0+0 1+3; 0+0 0+1; 0+2 0+2	+5:23.7
12	15	Slovenia Živa Klemenčič; Lena Repinc; Anamarija Lampič; Polona Klemenčič	1:20:18.0; 19:00.4; 20:01.9; 21:59.0; 19:16.7	0+3 3+9; 0+0 0+2; 0+1 0+3; 0+1 3+2; 0+1 0+2	+5:38.3
13	9	Finland Suvi Minkkinen; Mari Eder; Nastassia Kinnunen; Erika Janka	1:20:37.6; 18:32.4; 19:14.4; 22:26.6; 20:24.2	1+6 0+5; 0+0 0+1; 0+3 0+0; 1+3 0+2; 0+0 0+2	+5:57.9
14	12	Ukraine Anastasiya Merkushyna; Darya Blashko; Liubov Kypiachenkova; Olena Bilosiuk	1:21:52.8; 19:07.5; 21:07.8; 20:08.2; 21:29.3	0+4 3+4; 0+3 0+0; 0+1 0+0; 0+0 0+1; 0+0 3+3	+7:13.1
15	13	United States Deedra Irwin; Joanne Reid; Chloe Levins; Kelsey Joan Dickinson	1:22:35.7; 20:13.3; 19:41.0; 20:43.8; 21:57.6	0+8 1+7; 0+3 1+3; 0+2 0+1; 0+1 0+1; 0+2 0+2	+7:56.0
16	16	Japan Fuyuko Tachizaki; Aoi Sato; Asuka Hachisuka; Hikaru Fukuda	1:23:18.3; 18:56.8; 21:09.5; 20:44.3; 22:27.7	0+5 0+7; 0+0 0+2; 0+3 0+3; 0+2 0+0; 0+0 0+2	+8:38.6
