= Biathlon World Championships 2024 – Women's relay =

Women's relay at the Biathlon World Championships 2024
- Venue: Vysočina Arena
- Location: Nové Město na Moravě, Czech Republic
- Dates: 17 February
- Competitors: 84 from 21 nations
- Teams: 21
- Winning time: 1:15:00.8

Medalists
gold medal	Lou Jeanmonnot; Sophie Chauveau; Justine Braisaz-Bouchet; Julia Simon	France
silver medal	Anna Magnusson; Linn Persson; Hanna Öberg; Elvira Öberg	Sweden
bronze medal	Janina Hettich-Walz; Selina Grotian; Vanessa Voigt; Sophia Schneider	Germany

The Women's relay competition at the Biathlon World Championships 2024 was held on 17 February 2024.

Team Italy was the defending champion. They did not defend their title, finishing the competition in 13th place.

Team France became the new world champion, winning the first ever gold medal at the women's relay world championships. The silver medal was won by team Sweden and the bronze medal by team Germany.

== Results ==
The race was started at 13:45.

Rank	Bib	Team	Time	Penalties (P+S)	Deficit
1st place, gold medalist(s)	2	France; Lou Jeanmonnot; Sophie Chauveau; Justine Braisaz-Bouchet; Julia Simon	1:15:00.8; 17:33.5; 19:54.9; 18:00.7; 19:31.7	1+4 1+7; 0+0 0+0; 1+3 1+3; 0+0 0+1; 0+1 0+3	
2nd place, silver medalist(s)	3	Sweden; Anna Magnusson; Linn Persson; Hanna Öberg; Elvira Öberg	1:15:39.1; 17:58.0; 19:08.4; 18:40.6; 19:52.1	0+2 1+10; 0+0 0+2; 0+1 0+3; 0+1 0+2; 0+0 1+3	+38.3
3rd place, bronze medalist(s)	4	Germany; Janina Hettich-Walz; Selina Grotian; Vanessa Voigt; Sophia Schneider	1:16:15.0; 18:00.3; 19:05.9; 19:14.4; 19:54.4	0+5 0+4; 0+0 0+0; 0+3 0+0; 0+1 0+1; 0+1 0+3	+1:14.2
4	14	Estonia; Regina Ermits; Tuuli Tomingas; Susan Külm; Johanna Talihärm	1:16:40.9; 17:54.3; 18:48.6; 19:15.0; 20:43.0	0+5 0+6; 0+1 0+0; 0+0 0+2; 0+1 0+1; 0+3 0+3	+1:40.1
5	8	Ukraine; Iryna Petrenko; Yuliia Dzhima; Anastasiya Merkushyna; Khrystyna Dmytrenko	1:17:09.6; 18:21.4; 19:04.3; 19:33.1; 20:10.8	0+2 0+8; 0+0 0+1; 0+0 0+1; 0+2 0+3; 0+0 0+3	+2:08.8
6	10	Poland; Natalia Sidorowicz; Anna Mąka; Kamila Cichon; Joanna Jakieła	1:17:15.4; 18:21.1; 19:08.4; 20:31.2; 19:14.7	0+1 0+2; 0+0 0+1; 0+0 0+1; 0+1 0+0; 0+0 0+0	+2:14.6
7	7	Czech Republic; Tereza Voborníková; Lucie Charvátová; Markéta Davidová; Jessica Jislová	1:17:23.5; 17:58.1; 19:43.6; 19:07.5; 20:34.3	0+4 2+8; 0+0 0+0; 0+2 1+3; 0+2 0+2; 0+0 1+3	+2:22.7
8	9	Austria; Tamara Steiner; Anna Gandler; Lisa Theresa Hauser; Anna Juppe	1:17:35.2; 18:32.6; 18:43.3; 18:48.4; 21:30.9	2+4 0+5; 0+0 0+1; 0+0 0+1; 0+1 0+1; 2+3 0+2	+2:34.4
9	6	Switzerland; Elisa Gasparin; Amy Baserga; Aita Gasparin; Lena Häcki	1:18:30.1; 18:50.0; 19:30.0; 19:32.2; 20:37.9	0+1 3+5; 0+0 0+0; 0+0 0+1; 0+0 0+1; 0+1 3+3	+3:29.3
10	1	Norway; Karoline Offigstad Knotten; Juni Arnekleiv; Ida Lien; Ingrid Landmark Tandrevold	1:18:43.6; 17:49.9; 19:12.2; 20:07.6; 21:33.9	0+6 5+10; 0+1 0+1; 0+2 0+3; 0+1 2+3; 0+2 3+3	+3:42.8
11	5	Italy; Samuela Comola; Dorothea Wierer; Rebecca Passler; Lisa Vittozzi	1:19:50.7; 19:59.1; 19:54.5; 19:56.5; 20:00.6	0+4 2+5; 0+1 2+3; 0+1 0+2; 0+1 0+0; 0+1 0+0	+4:49.9
12	18	Canada; Emma Lunder; Nadia Moser; Benita Peiffer; Emily Dickson	1:20:08.8; 19:05.7; 19:43.4; 20:22.0; 20:57.7	0+6 0+7; 0+3 0+2; 0+2 0+0; 0+0 0+2; 0+1 0+3	+5:08.0
13	11	Slovenia; Lena Repinc; Polona Klemenčič; Živa Klemenčič; Anamarija Lampič	1:20:37.2; 19:12.2; 19:35.6; 21:45.3; 20:04.1	0+4 3+8; 0+3 0+0; 0+0 0+2; 0+0 1+3; 0+1 2+3	+5:36.4
14	21	Belgium; Lotte Lie; Maya Cloetens; Eve Bouvard; Marine Debloem	1:21:08.8; 18:16.8; 19:06.5; 19:50.4; 23:55.1	1+5 0+8; 0+1 0+1; 0+0 0+1; 0+1 0+3; 1+3 0+3	+6:08.0
15	17	Latvia; Sanita Bulina; Baiba Bendika; Annija Sabule; Sandra Bulina	LAP; 18:59.6; 19:12.9; 21:35.9	2+8; 0+2 0+0; 0+2 0+2; 0+1 0+1; 2+3	
16	19	Bulgaria; Lora Hristova; Valentina Dimitrova; Maria Zdravkova; Stefani Yolova	LAP; 18:51.5; 19:43.6; 21:18.6	1+10; 0+2 0+1; 0+3 0+0; 0+2 0+3; 1+3	
17	12	Finland; Suvi Minkkinen; Daria Virolainen; Venla Lehtonen; Noora Kaisa Keränen	LAP; 18:17.1; 22:15.1; 20:14.3	1+5; 0+0 0+0; 1+3 1+3; 0+1 0+3; 0+1	
18	16	Kazakhstan; Galina Vishnevskaya-Sheporenko; Olga Poltoranina; Polina Yegorova; Alina Skripkina	LAP; 19:27.2; 20:45.6	0+0 0+1; 0+0 0+1; 0+1 0+3	
19	20	South Korea; Ekaterina Avvakumova; Choi Yoon-ah; Ko Eun-jung; Jung Ju-mi	LAP; 19:09.3; 21:46.1	0+0 0+2; 0+0 0+2; 0+1 0+2	
20	13	Slovakia; Zuzana Remeňová; Anastasiya Kuzmina; Júlia Machyniaková; Mária Remenová	LAP; 20:41.0; 21:18.5	2+3 0+1; 0+3 2+3; 0+0 0+3	
21	15	United States; Chloe Levins; Deedra Irwin; Jackie Garso; Tara Geraghty-Moats	LAP; 21:06.9; 20:46.8	0+2 2+3; 1+3 0+1; 0+3	
