= Biathlon at the 2022 Winter Olympics – Women's relay =

Women’s relay at the XXIV Olympic Winter Games
- Biathlon
- Venue: Hualindong Ski Resort
- Date: 16 February 2022
- Competitors: 80 from 20 nations
- Teams: 20
- Winning time: 1:11:03.9

Medalists
1st place, gold medalist(s)		Linn Persson; Mona Brorsson; Hanna Öberg; Elvira Öberg	Sweden
2nd place, silver medalist(s)		Irina Kazakevich; Kristina Reztsova; Svetlana Mironova; Uliana Nigmatullina	ROC
3rd place, bronze medalist(s)		Vanessa Voigt; Vanessa Hinz; Franziska Preuß; Denise Herrmann	Germany

The Women's relay competition of the Beijing 2022 Olympics was held on 16 February, at the National Biathlon Centre, in the Zhangjiakou cluster of competition venues, 180 kilometres (110 mi) north of Beijing, at an elevation of 1,665 metres (5,463 ft). Linn Persson, Mona Brorsson, Hanna Öberg, and Elvira Öberg of Sweden won the event, with the Russian Olympic Committee winning the silver medal, and Germany bronze. This was the first Olympic gold in women's relay for Sweden.

== Summary ==
The defending champions are Belarus, and the 2018 silver and bronze medalists were Sweden and France, respectively. There were four women's relays in the 2021–22 Biathlon World Cup before the Olympics; two were won by France, and one by Sweden and Norway each. Norway are also the 2021 World Champion with Germany and Ukraine as silver and bronze medalists.

Germany, Sweden, and Italy finished the first leg together, with an advantage of about 15-20 seconds over a large group of competitors, which included all the top teams. There were no penalty loops in the first leg. In the second leg, France and Belarus run one penalty loop each, and Norway run two, and these teams dropped behind. At the second exchange the Russian Olympic Committee were leading, 11 seconds ahead of Italy, 27 seconds ahead of Sweden, and 46 seconds ahead of Germany. Norway were almost two minutes behind, as well as the number of other teams. On the second shooting of the third leg, Svetlana Mironova had to run a penalty loop. She remained in the leading group, but lost the advantage she developed on the leg. At the third interchange, Sweden were leading, with Italy 7 seconds behind, the Russian Olympic committee 13 seconds, Germany 37 seconds, and Norway and France one minute 15 seconds behind. In leg 4, France got a penalty loop at the second shooting and dropped out of medal contention. After the last shooting, Sweden were leading with the Russian Olympic Committee 25 seconds, Germany 35 seconds, and Norway 54 seconds behind. They finished in the same order.

== Results ==
The race was started at 15:45.

Rank	Bib	Country	Time	Penalties (P+S)	Deficit
1st place, gold medalist(s)	3	Sweden; Linn Persson; Mona Brorsson; Hanna Öberg; Elvira Öberg	1:11:03.9; 17:24.9; 17:45.9; 17:58.4; 17:54.7	0+6; 0+0 0+1; 0+0 0+0; 0+1 0+3; 0+0 0+1	—
2nd place, silver medalist(s)	2	ROC; Irina Kazakevich; Kristina Reztsova; Svetlana Mironova; Uliana Nigmatullina	1:11:15.9; 17:41.3; 17:02.5; 18:38.9; 17:53.2	1+7; 0+1 0+1; 0+1 0+0; 0+0 1+3; 0+0 0+1	+12.0
3rd place, bronze medalist(s)	5	Germany; Vanessa Voigt; Vanessa Hinz; Franziska Preuß; Denise Herrmann	1:11:41.3; 17:24.4; 18:05.3; 18:16.5; 17:55.1	0+6; 0+0 0+0; 0+0 0+2; 0+0 0+2; 0+1 0+1	+37.4
4	4	Norway; Karoline Offigstad Knotten; Tiril Eckhoff; Ida Lien; Marte Olsbu Røiseland	1:11:54.6; 17:38.0; 18:59.2; 17:47.5; 17:29.9	2+8; 0+0 0+0; 0+2 2+3; 0+0 0+1; 0+1 0+1	+50.7
5	7	Italy; Lisa Vittozzi; Dorothea Wierer; Samuela Comola; Federica Sanfilippo	1:12:37.0; 17:25.9; 17:28.6; 18:22.1; 19:20.4	0+5; 0+1 0+1; 0+0 0+0; 0+0 0+1; 0+0 0+2	+1:33.1
6	1	France; Anaïs Bescond; Anaïs Chevalier-Bouchet; Justine Braisaz-Bouchet; Julia Simon	1:13:16.9; 17:36.9; 18:53.4; 17:55.1; 18:51.5	2+10; 0+0 0+1; 1+3 0+1; 0+2 0+0; 0+0 1+3	+2:13.0
7	9	Ukraine; Iryna Petrenko; Yuliia Dzhima; Anastasiya Merkushyna; Olena Bilosiuk	1:14:04.1; 17:46.1; 19:06.1; 18:09.5; 19:02.4	1+6; 0+0 0+0; 1+3 0+3; 0+0 0+0; 0+0 0+0	+3:00.2
8	8	Czech Republic; Eva Puskarčíková; Markéta Davidová; Jessica Jislová; Lucie Charvátová	1:14:06.0; 18:20.2; 17:40.7; 18:49.8; 19:15.3	1+8; 0+0 0+2; 0+0 0+1; 0+1 0+1; 0+0 1+3	+3:02.1
9	14	Austria; Dunja Zdouc; Lisa Theresa Hauser; Anna Juppe; Katharina Innerhofer	1:15:07.6; 18:13.0; 18:12.3; 19:51.3; 18:51.0	3+7; 0+0 0+0; 0+1 0+0; 2+3 0+0; 0+0 1+3	+4:03.7
10	16	Canada; Emma Lunder; Megan Bankes; Emily Dickson; Sarah Beaudry	1:15:34.3; 17:45.8; 18:29.7; 19:39.3; 19:39.5	0+8; 0+1 0+1; 0+0 0+3; 0+1 0+2; 0+0 0+0	+4:30.4
11	10	United States; Susan Dunklee; Clare Egan; Deedra Irwin; Joanne Reid	1:15:51.3; 18:44.8; 19:04.1; 19:17.1; 18:45.3	2+9; 0+0 0+0; 0+2 1+3; 0+0 1+3; 0+0 0+1	+4:47.4
12	18	China; Tang Jialin; Chu Yuanmeng; Ding Yuhuan; Meng Fanqi	1:16:11.5; 18:05.2; 18:37.9; 19:44.2; 19:44.2	1+5; 0+0 0+1; 0+0 0+1; 0+0 1+3; 0+0 0+0	+5:07.6
13	6	Belarus; Iryna Leshchanka; Dzinara Alimbekava; Elena Kruchinkina; Hanna Sola	1:16:34.4; 17:51.9; 18:59.9; 20:47.7; 18:54.9	5+16; 0+0 0+2; 0+0 1+3; 0+3 3+3; 0+2 1+3	+5:30.5
14	15	Poland; Monika Hojnisz-Staręga; Kamila Żuk; Kinga Zbylut; Anna Mąka	1:17:12.1; 18:06.0; 20:04.3; 19:33.1; 19:28.7	1+10; 0+2 0+1; 1+3 0+1; 0+0 0+3; 0+0 0+0	+6:08.2
15	12	Estonia; Regina Oja; Tuuli Tomingas; Susan Külm; Johanna Talihärm	LAP; 18:18.9; 19:36.8; 18:42.6; LAP	0+1 0+3; 0+2 2+3; 0+1 0+0; 3+3	
16	13	Finland; Suvi Minkkinen; Mari Eder; Erika Jänkä; Nastassia Kinnunen	LAP; 19:15.2; 17:39.3; 21:11.6; LAP	0+0 0+0; 0+0 0+0; 0+1 2+3; 0+2	
17	17	Japan; Fuyuko Tachizaki; Sari Maeda; Asuka Hachisuka; Yurie Tanaka	LAP; 17:55.9; 19:01.8; 21:16.4; LAP	0+1 0+2; 0+0 0+3; 0+0 2+3; 0+3	
18	20	Bulgaria; Milena Todorova; Maria Zdravkova; Lora Hristova; Daniela Kadeva	LAP; 17:36.7; 21:04.7; LAP	0+1 0+1; 0+0 1+3; 0+1 0+1	
19	19	Slovakia; Ivona Fialková; Henrieta Horvátová; Veronika Machyniaková; Paulína Fialková	LAP; 17:43.0; 20:10.2; LAP	0+1 0+2; 0+3 0+2; 2+3 0+1	
	11	Switzerland; Irene Cadurisch; Lena Häcki; Selina Gasparin; Amy Baserga	DNF; DNF	0+2 0+1	
