= Hanna Kebinger =

German biathlete (born 1997)

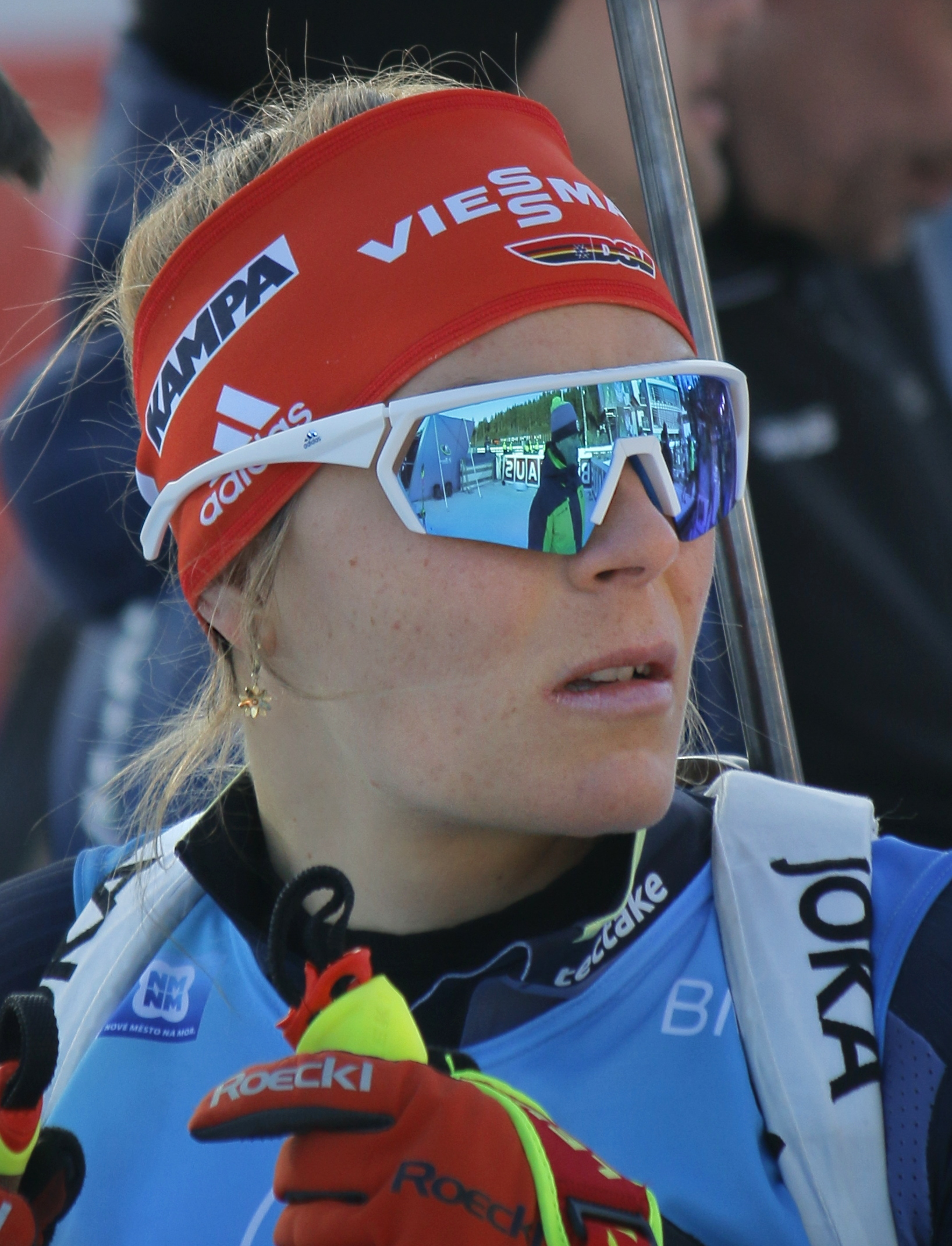
- Kebinger in 2023

Personal information
- Nationality: German
- Born: 26 November 1997 (age 28) Garmisch-Partenkirchen, Germany
- Height: 1.66 m (5 ft 5 in)

Sport

Professional information
- Club: SC Partenkirchen

World Championships
- Teams: 1 (2023)
- Medals: 1

World Cup
- Seasons: 1 (2022/23–)
- All podiums: 2
Medal record
Women's biathlon
Representing Germany
World Championships
Silver medal – second place	2023 Oberhof	4 × 6 km relay
European Championships
Silver medal – second place	2026 Sjusjøen	4 × 6 km relay
Junior World Championships
Silver medal – second place	2019 Osrblie	3 × 6 km relay
Silver medal – second place	2019 Osrblie	10 km pursuit
Bronze medal – third place	2019 Osrblie	7.5 km sprint

Hanna Kebinger (born 26 November 1997) is a German biathlete. She won silver medal at Biathlon World Championships 2023 with Germany women's relay team.

== Biathlon results ==
All results are sourced from the International Biathlon Union.

=== World Championships ===
1 medals (1 silver)

Year	Age	Individual	Sprint	Pursuit	Mass start	Relay	Mixed relay	Single mixed relay
(Germany) 2023 Oberhof	25	30th	17th	8th	12th	Silver	—	—

=== World Cup ===
Season	Age	Overall		Individual		Sprint		Pursuit		Mass start	
Season	Age	Points	Position	Points	Position	Points	Position	Points	Position	Points	Position
2022–23	25	–	–	–	–	–	–	–	–	–	–

=== Relay podiums ===
No.	Season	Date	Location	Level	Placement	Teammate
1	2022–23	22 January 2023	(Italy) Antholz-Anterselva	World Cup	Bronze	Voigt, Hettich-Walz, Schneider
2	2022–23	8 February 2023	(Germany) Oberhof	World Championships	Silver	Voigt, Schneider, Herrmann-Wick
