= Linn Gestblom =

Swedish biathlete (born 1994)

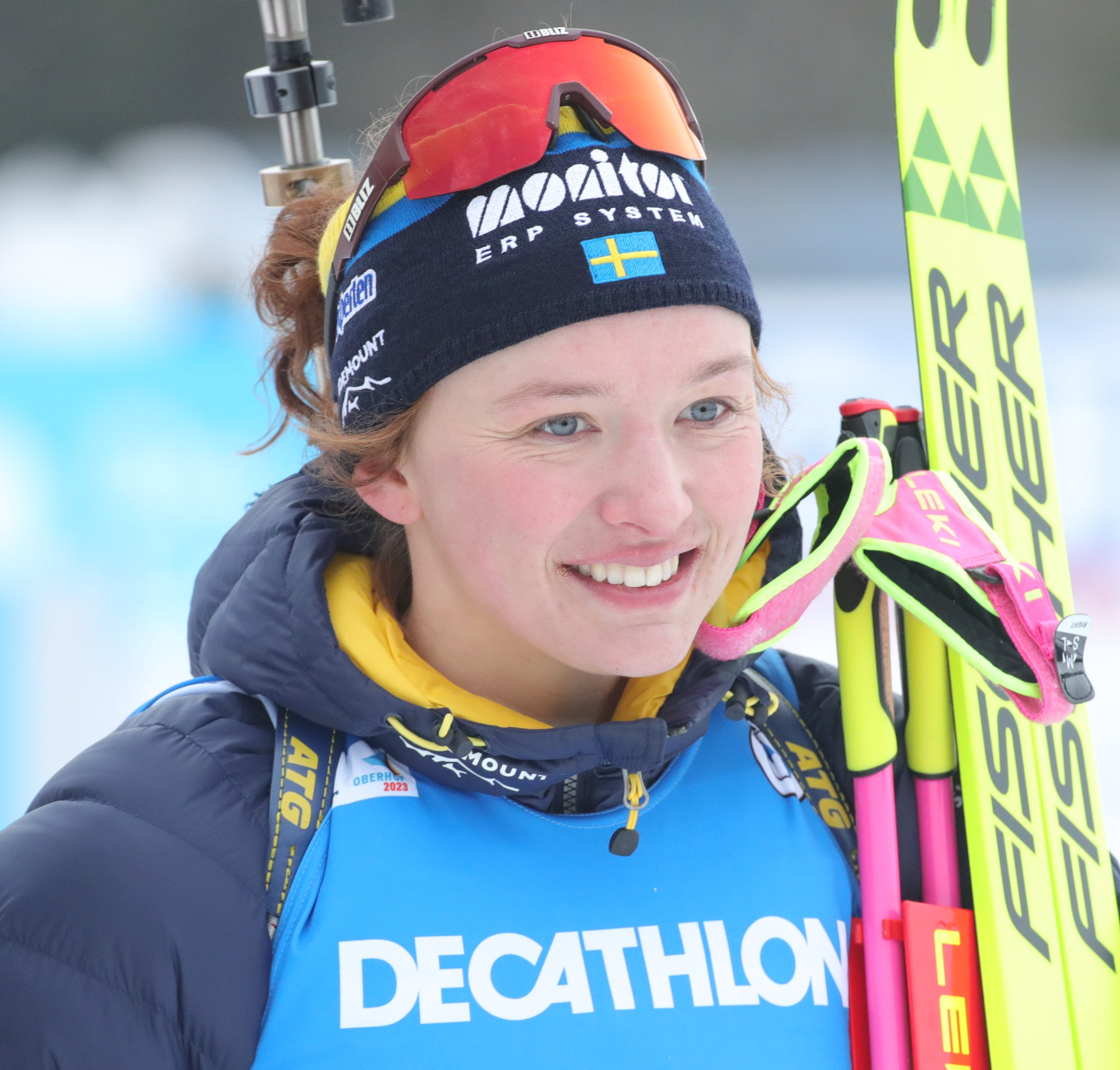
- Gestblom in 2023

Personal information
- Nationality: Swedish
- Born: 27 June 1994 (age 32) Torsby, Sweden
- Height: 1.65 m (5 ft 5 in)
- Weight: 61 kg (134 lb)

Sport

Professional information
- Sport: Biathlon
- Club: SK Bore
- World Cup debut: 2015

Olympic Games
- Teams: 3 (2018, 2022, 2026)
- Medals: 3 (1 gold)

World Championships
- Teams: 6 (2016, 2019–2024)
- Medals: 6 (0 gold)
Medal record
Women's biathlon
Representing Sweden
International biathlon competitions
Event	1st	2nd	3rd
Olympic Games	1	2	0
World Championships	0	3	3
Total	1	5	3
Olympic Games
Gold medal – first place	2022 Beijing	4 × 6 km relay
Silver medal – second place	2018 Pyeongchang	4 × 6 km relay
Silver medal – second place	2026 Milano Cortina	4 × 6 km relay
World Championships
Silver medal – second place	2019 Östersund	4 x 6 km relay
Silver medal – second place	2023 Oberhof	15 km individual
Silver medal – second place	2024 Nové Město	4 × 6 km relay
Bronze medal – third place	2021 Pokljuka	Mixed relay
Bronze medal – third place	2023 Oberhof	7.5 km sprint
Bronze medal – third place	2023 Oberhof	4 × 6 km relay
Youth World Championships
Silver medal – second place	2012 Kontiolahti	3 × 6 km relay

Linn Gestblom (née Persson; born 27 June 1994) is a Swedish biathlete. She has competed in the World Cup, and represented Sweden at the 2016 World Championships.

== Summer biathlon ==
In August 2019, she became Swedish champion at 15 kilometres distance during the Swedish national summer biathlon championships in Sollefteå.

== Personal life ==
In June 2024, Linn Persson married her partner Christian Gestblom and has been known as Linn Gestblom ever since.

== Biathlon results ==
All results are sourced from the International Biathlon Union.

=== Olympic Games ===
3 medals (1 gold, 2 silver)

Event	Individual	Sprint	Pursuit	Mass start	Relay	Mixed relay
(South Korea) 2018 Pyeongchang	11th	37th	21st	22nd	Silver	–
(China) 2022 Beijing	15th	12th	5th	24th	Gold	–
(Italy) 2026 Milano Cortina	9th	22nd	10th	25th	Silver	–

=== World Championships ===
6 medals (3 silver, 3 bronze)

Event	Individual	Sprint	Pursuit	Mass start	Relay	Mixed relay	Single mixed relay
(Norway) 2016 Oslo	36th	34th	40th	—	10th	12th	—N/a
(Sweden) 2019 Östersund	15th	42nd	21st	9th	Silver	5th	—
(Italy) 2020 Antholz-Anterselva	47th	44th	32nd	—	5th	11th	—
(Slovenia) 2021 Pokljuka	21st	16th	19th	11th	5th	Bronze	—
(Germany) 2023 Oberhof	Silver	Bronze	10th	8th	Bronze	—N/a	—N/a
(Czech Republic) 2024 Nové Město na Moravě	10th	—	—	17th	Silver	—	—

*During Olympic seasons competitions are only held for those events not included in the Olympic program.
**The single mixed relay was added as an event in 2019.

=== World Cup ===
Season	Age	Overall		Individual		Sprint		Pursuit		Mass start	
Season	Age	Points	Position	Points	Position	Points	Position	Points	Position	Points	Position
2015–16	21	81	59th	17	48th	36	54th	28	55th	–	–
2017–18	23	97	51st	43	17th	39	55th	15	64th	–	–
2018–19	24	340	28th	48	22nd	87	33rd	116	24th	89	22nd
2019–20	25	346	19th	24	40th	106	29th	114	11th	102	18th
2020–21	26	572	14th	66	10th	177	15th	168	13th	103	17th
2021–22	27	416	19th	–	–	196	14th	134	17th	86	17th
2022–23	28	524	13th	28	31st	227	8th	189	9th	80	16th
2023–24	29	325	21st	29	38th	126	18th	131	18th	39	26th
2025–26	31	206	33rd	17	54th	77	31st	89	27th	23	41st

==== Individual podiums ====
- 5 podiums

No.	Season	Date	Location	Race	Level	Place
1	2019–20	22 December 2019	(France) Le Grand-Bornand	Mass Start	World Cup	3rd
2	2022-23	3 December 2022	(Finland) Kontiolahti	Sprint	World Cup	3rd
3	2022-23	16 December 2022	(France) Le Grand-Bornand	Sprint	World Cup	2nd
4	2022-23	10 February 2023	(Germany) Oberhof	Sprint	World Championships	3rd
5	2022-23	15 February 2023	(Germany) Oberhof	Individual	World Championships	2nd

==== World Cup Team podiums ====
- 5 victories (4 Women, 1 Single Mixed)
- 23 podiums (20 Women, 2 Mixed, 1 Single Mixed)

No.	Season	Date	Location	Race	Place	Teammate(s)
1	2017–18	7 January 2018	(Germany) Oberhof	Relay	3rd	Anna Magnusson, Elisabeth Högberg, Mona Brorsson
2	2017–18	13 January 2018	(Germany) Ruhpolding	Relay	3rd	Mona Brorsson, Anna Magnusson, Hanna Öberg
3	2018–19	16 December 2018	(Austria) Hochfilzen	Relay	2nd	Mona Brorsson, Emma Nilsson, Hanna Öberg
4	2019–20	30 November 2019	(Sweden) Östersund	Mixed Relay	3rd	Mona Brorsson, Jesper Nelin, Martin Ponsiluoma
5	2019–20	8 December 2019	(Sweden) Östersund	Relay	3rd	Elvira Öberg, Mona Brorsson, Hanna Öberg
6	2019–20	11 January 2020	(Germany) Oberhof	Relay	2nd	Elvira Öberg, Mona Brorsson, Hanna Öberg
7	2020–21	12 December 2020	(Austria) Hochfilzen	Relay	3rd	Johanna Skottheim, Hanna Öberg, Elvira Öberg
8	2020–21	16 January 2021	(Germany) Oberhof	Relay	3rd	Mona Brorsson, Elvira Öberg, Hanna Öberg
9	2020–21	4 March 2021	(Czech Republic) Nové Město	Relay	1st	Mona Brorsson, Hanna Öberg, Elvira Öberg
10	2020–21	16 January 2021	(Czech Republic) Nové Město	Single Mixed Relay	1st	Sebastian Samuelsson
11	2021-22	4 December 2021	(Sweden) Östersund	Relay	3rd	Mona Brorsson, Elvira Öberg, Hanna Öberg
12	2021-22	11 December 2021	(Austria) Hochfilzen	Relay	1st	Anna Magnusson, Elvira Öberg, Hanna Öberg
13	2021-22	3 March 2022	(Finland) Kontiolahti	Relay	2nd	Anna Magnusson, Hanna Öberg, Elvira Öberg
14	2021-22	13 March 2022	(Finland) Kontiolahti	Mixed Relay	2nd	Jesper Nelin, Martin Ponsiluoma, Elvira Öberg
15	2022-23	1 December 2022	(Finland) Kontiolahti	Relay	1st	Anna Magnusson, Hanna Öberg, Elvira Öberg
16	2022-23	11 December 2022	(Austria) Hochfilzen	Relay	2nd	Anna Magnusson, Hanna Öberg, Elvira Öberg
17	2022-23	22 January 2023	(Italy) Antholz-Anterselva	Relay	2nd	Anna Magnusson, Hanna Öberg, Elvira Öberg
19	2023-24	19 November 2023	(Sweden) Östersund	Relay	2nd	Anna Magnusson, Elvira Öberg, Hanna Öberg
20	2023-24	7 January 2024	(Germany) Oberhof	Relay	3rd	Anna Magnusson, Hanna Öberg, Elvira Öberg
21	2023-24	10 January 2024	(Germany) Ruhpolding	Relay	2nd	Anna Magnusson, Mona Brorsson, Elvira Öberg
22	2025-26	14 January 2026	(Germany) Ruhpolding	Relay	3rd	Johanna Skottheim, Elvira Öberg, Hanna Öberg
23	2025-26	8 March 2024	(Finland) Kontiolahti	Relay	1st	Anna Magnusson, Hanna Öberg, Elvira Öberg
