= Vanessa Voigt =

German biathlete (born 1997)

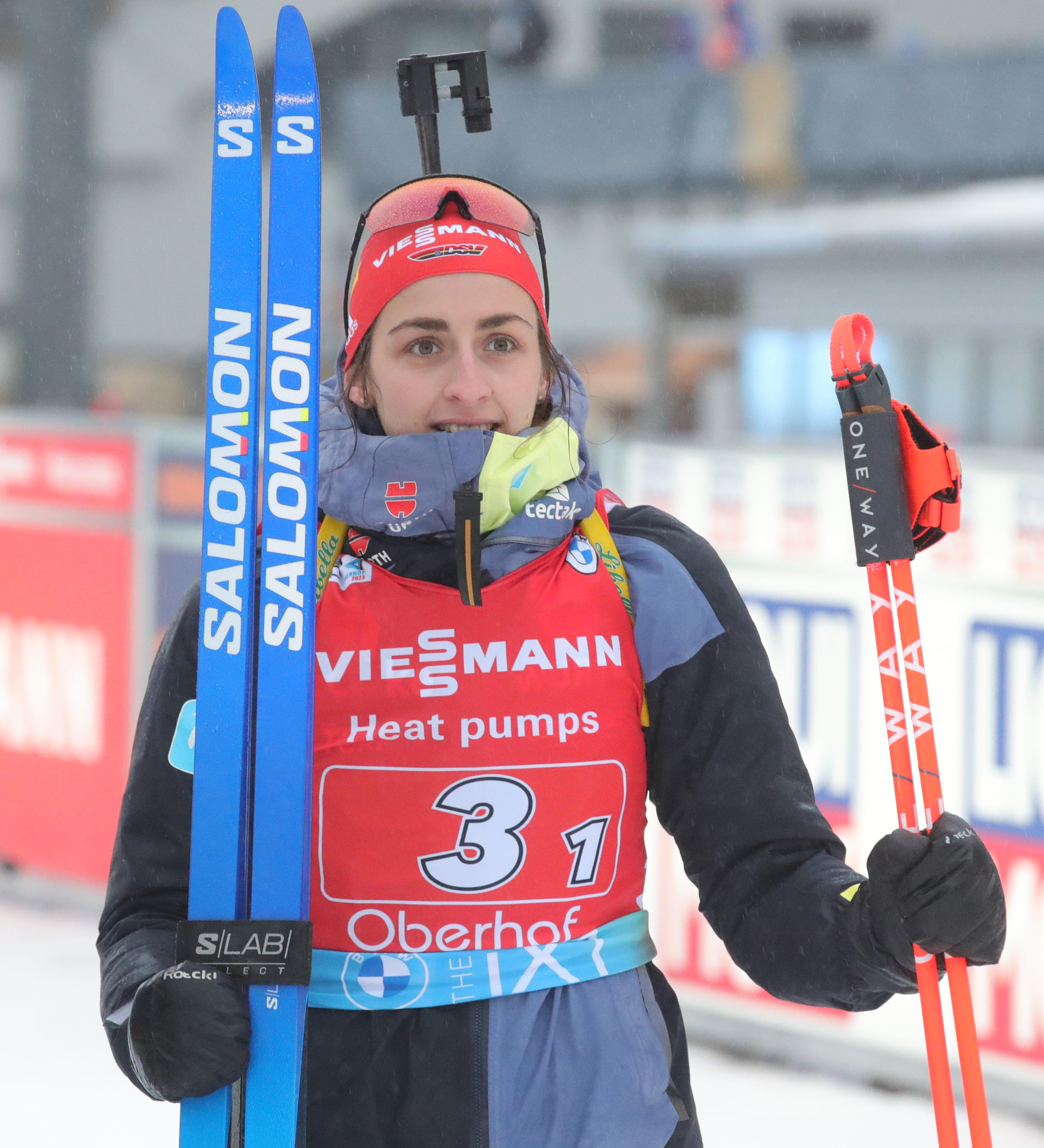
- Voigt in 2023

Personal information
- Nationality: German
- Born: 7 October 1997 (age 28) Schmalkalden, Germany

Sport

Professional information
- Sport: Biathlon
- Club: WSV Rotterode
- World Cup debut: 2021

Olympic Games
- Teams: 2 (2022, 2026)
- Medals: 2 (0 gold)

World Championships
- Teams: 2 (2023, 2024)
- Medals: 2 (0 gold)

World Cup
- Seasons: 4 (2020/21–)
- Individual victories: 0
- All victories: 2
- Individual podiums: 4
- All podiums: 11
- Overall titles: 0
- Discipline titles: 0
Medal record
Women's biathlon
Representing Germany
Olympic Games
Bronze medal – third place	2022 Beijing	4 × 6 km relay
Bronze medal – third place	2026 Milano Cortina	Mixed relay
World Championships
Silver medal – second place	2023 Oberhof	4 × 6 km relay
Bronze medal – third place	2024 Nové Město	4 × 6 km relay
European Championships
Silver medal – second place	2021 Duszniki-Zdrój	Mixed relay
Junior World Championships
Silver medal – second place	2017 Osrblie	3 × 6 km relay

Vanessa Voigt (born 7 October 1997) is a German biathlete. She won the 2020–21 Biathlon IBU Cup and represented Germany at the 2022 Winter Olympics.

== Career ==
Voigt won the IBU Cup during the 2020–21 season. She represented Germany at the 2022 Winter Olympics in the 15 km individual race and finished in fourth place with a time of 44:29.3. She won a bronze medal in the women's relay.

== Biathlon results ==
All results are sourced from the International Biathlon Union.

=== Olympic Games ===
2 medals (2 bronze)

Year	Age	Individual	Sprint	Pursuit	Mass start	Relay	Mixed relay	Single mixed relay
(China) 2022 Beijing	24	4th	18th	12th	18th	Bronze	5th	—N/a
(Italy) 2026 Milano Cortina	28	4th	12th	19th	7th	4th	Bronze	—N/a

=== World Championships ===
2 medals (1 silver, 1 bronze)

Year	Individual	Sprint	Pursuit	Mass start	Relay	Mixed relay	Single mixed relay
(Germany) 2023 Oberhof	19th	41st	46th	23rd	Silver	6th	—
(Czech Republic) 2024 Nové Město	5th	18th	15th	5th	Bronze	5th	6th

*During Olympic seasons competitions are only held for those events not included in the Olympic program.
**The single mixed relay was added as an event in 2019.

=== World Cup ===
==== Individual podiums ====
- 5 podium

No.	Season	Date	Location	Level	Race	Place
1	2021–22	11 March 2022	(Estonia) Otepää	World Cup	7.5 km Sprint	2nd
2	2023–24	26 November 2023	(Sweden) Östersund	World Cup	15 km Individual	3rd
3	2023–24	3 December 2023	(Sweden) Östersund	World Cup	10 km Pursuit	3rd
4	2024–25	15 December 2024	(Austria) Hochfilzen	World Cup	10 km Pursuit	2nd
5	2024–25	21 December 2024	(France) Annecy	World Cup	10 km Pursuit	3rd

=== Relay podiums ===
No.	Season	Date	Location	Level	Place	Teammate
1	2021–22	16 February 2022	(China) Beijing	Olympic Games	Bronze	Hinz, Preuss, Herrmann-Wick
2	2022–23	1 December 2022	(Finland) Kontiolahti	World Cup	Silver	Weidel, Schneider, Herrmann-Wick
3	2022–23	14 January 2023	(Germany) Ruhpolding	World Cup	Silver	Weidel, Schneider, Herrmann-Wick
4	2022–23	22 January 2023	(Italy) Antholz-Anterselva	World Cup	Bronze	Schneider, Hettich-Walz, Kebinger
5	2022–23	8 February 2023	(Germany) Oberhof	World Championships	Silver	Schneider, Kebinger, Herrmann-Wick
6	2022–23	11 March 2023	(Sweden) Östersund	World Cup	Bronze	Hettich-Walz, Kebinger, Herrmann-Wick
7	2023–24	29 November 2023	(Sweden) Östersund	World Cup	Bronze	Hettich-Walz, Grotian, Preuß
8	2023–24	20 January 2024	(Italy) Antholz	World Cup	Gold	Strelow
9	2024–25	30 November 2024	(Finland) Kontiolahti	World Cup	Bronze	Strelow
10	2024–25	15 December 2024	(Austria) Hochfilzen	World Cup	Gold	Tannheimer, Grotian, Preuß
