= Sophia Schneider =

German biathlete (born 1997)

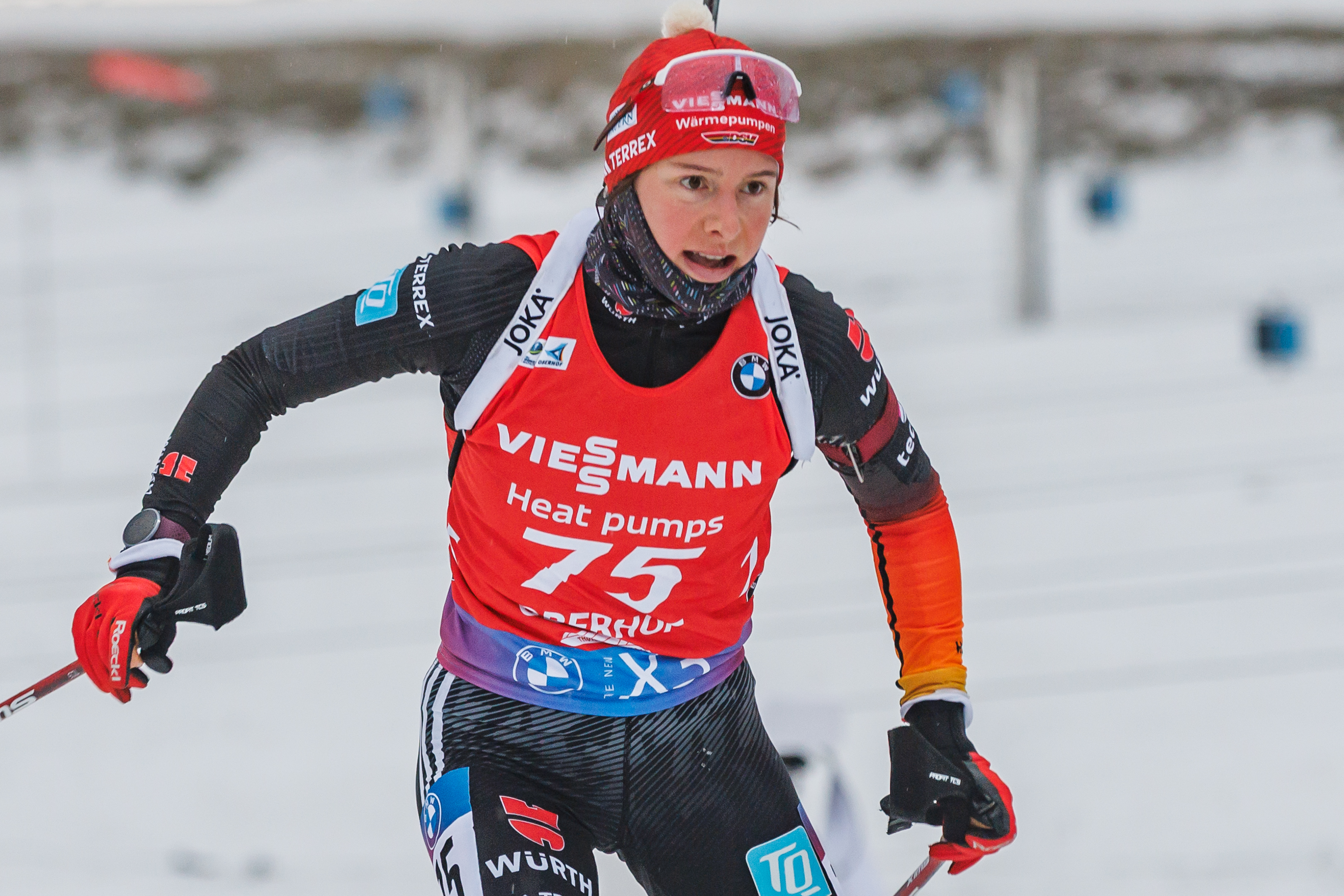
- Schneider in 2025

Personal information
- Nationality: German
- Born: 12 September 1997 (age 28) Traunstein, Germany
- Height: 1.67 m (5 ft 6 in)

Sport

Professional information
- Club: SV Oberteisendorf

World Championships
- Teams: 3 (2023–2025)
- Medals: 2 (0 gold)

World Cup
- Seasons: 3 (2022/23–)
- Individual victories: 0
- All victories: 1
- Individual podiums: 0
- All podiums: 7
Medal record
Women's biathlon
Representing Germany
World Championships
Silver medal – second place	2023 Oberhof	4 × 6 km relay
Bronze medal – third place	2024 Nové Město	4 × 6 km relay
Junior World Championships
Silver medal – second place	2017 Osrblie	3 × 6 km relay

Sophia Schneider (born 12 September 1997) is a German biathlete. She won silver medal at Biathlon World Championships 2023 with Germany women's relay team.

== Biathlon results ==
All results are sourced from the International Biathlon Union.

=== World Championships ===
2 medals (1 silver, 1 bronze)

Year	Individual	Sprint	Pursuit	Mass start	Relay	Mixed relay	Single mixed relay
(Germany) 2023 Oberhof	13th	7th	5th	27th	Silver	—	6th
(Czech Republic) 2024 Nové Město	—	28th	37th		Bronze	—	—
(Switzerland) 2025 Lenzerheide		11th	23rd	28th	5th		

=== World Cup ===
Season	Age	Overall		Individual		Sprint		Pursuit		Mass start	
Season	Age	Points	Position	Points	Position	Points	Position	Points	Position	Points	Position
2022–23	25	–	–	–	–	–	–	–	–	–	–

=== Relay podiums ===
No.	Season	Date	Location	Level	Placement	Teammate
1	2022–23	1 December 2022	(Finland) Kontiolahti	World Cup	Silver	Weidel, Voigt, Herrmann-Wick
2	2022–23	14 January 2023	(Germany) Ruhpolding	World Cup	Silver	Weidel, Voigt, Herrmann-Wick
3	2022–23	22 January 2023	(Italy) Antholz-Anterselva	World Cup	Bronze	Voigt, Hettich-Walz, Kebinger
4	2022–23	8 February 2023	(Germany) Oberhof	World Championships	Silver	Voigt, Kebinger, Herrmann-Wick
5	2023–24	10 January 2024	(Germany) Ruhpolding	World Cup	Bronze	Hettich-Walz, Preuß, Kebinger
6	2023–24	17 February 2024	(Czech Republic) Nové Město	World Championships	Bronze	Hettich-Walz, Grotian, Voigt
7	2024–25	18 January 2025	(Germany) Ruhpolding	Biathlon World Cup	Gold	Scherer / Grotian / Preuß
