= Mona Brorsson =

Swedish biathlete (born 1990)

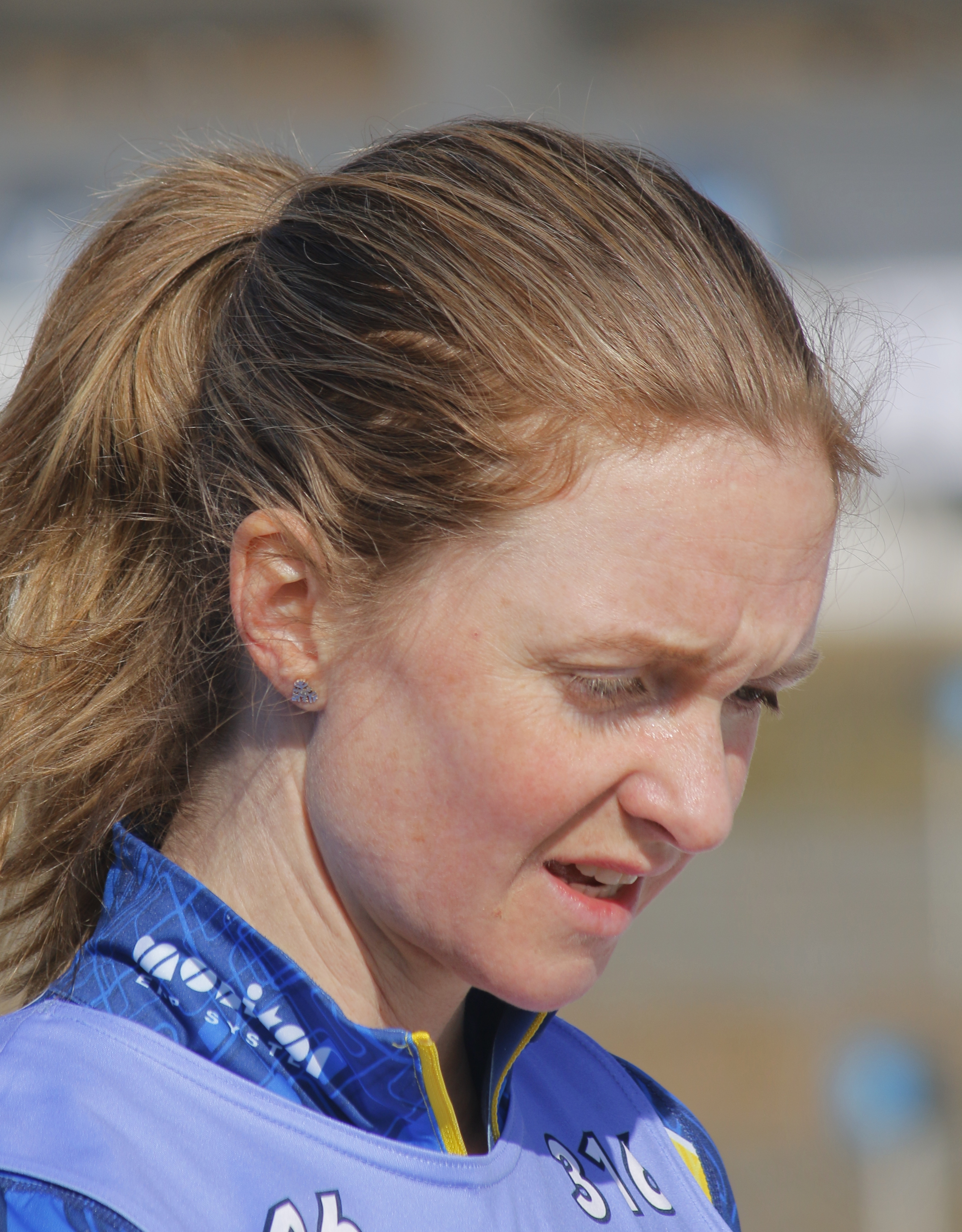
- Mona Brorsson (2023)

Personal information
- Nationality: Swedish
- Born: 28 March 1990 (age 36) Eda, Sweden
- Height: 1.67 m (5 ft 6 in)
- Weight: 64 kg (141 lb)

Sport

Professional information
- Sport: Biathlon
- World Cup debut: 2013

Olympic Games
- Teams: 2 (2018, 2022)
- Medals: 2 (1 gold)

World Championships
- Teams: 5 (2015–2019)
- Medals: 1
Medal record
Women's biathlon
Representing Sweden
International biathlon competitions
Event	1st	2nd	3rd
Olympic Games	1	1	0
World Championships	0	1	0
Total	1	2	0
Olympic Games
Gold medal – first place	2022 Beijing	4 × 6 km relay
Silver medal – second place	2018 Pyeongchang	4 × 6 km relay
World Championships
Silver medal – second place	2019 Östersund	4 x 6 km relay
European Championships
Gold medal – first place	2014 Nové Město	10 km pursuit
Gold medal – first place	2019 Raubichi	Mixed Relay
Gold medal – first place	2019 Raubichi	7.5 km sprint

Mona Brorsson (born 28 March 1990) is a Swedish former biathlete. She was part of the Swedish Olympic champion relay team in 2022. She competed in the World Cup for more than ten seasons representing Sweden. She has expressed her intentions to retire after the 2023/24 World Cup season.

== Career ==
Brorsson's achievements include winning a silver medal at the 2018 Winter Olympics, silver medal at the 2019 world championships, and a gold medal at the 2022 Winter Olympics.

== Personal life ==
Brorsson was born in Koppom on 28 March 1990.

== Biathlon results ==
All results are sourced from the International Biathlon Union.

=== Olympic Games ===
2 medals (1 gold, 1 silver)

Event	Individual	Sprint	Pursuit	Mass start	Relay	Mixed relay
(South Korea) 2018 Pyeongchang	14th	27th	10th	13th	Silver	11th
(China) 2022 Beijing	12th	–	–	21st	Gold	–

=== World Championships ===
1 medal (1 silver)

Event	Individual	Sprint	Pursuit	Mass start	Relay	Mixed relay	Single mixed relay
(Finland) 2015 Kontiolahti	23rd	28th	38th	—N/a	8th	16th	—N/a
(Norway) 2016 Oslo	29th	6th	39th	28th	10th	12th	—N/a
(Austria) 2017 Hochfilzen	44th	56th	46th	—N/a	6th	—N/a	—N/a
(Sweden) 2019 Östersund	6th	5th	7th	14th	Silver	—N/a	—N/a
(Italy) 2020 Antholz-Anterselva	18th	33rd	29th	—N/a	5th	—N/a	—N/a
(Slovenia) 2021 Pokljuka	—N/a	58th	53rd	—N/a	—N/a	—N/a	—N/a
(Germany) 2023 Oberhof	29th	22nd	15th	21st	—N/a	—N/a	—N/a
(Czech Republic) 2024 Nové Město	9th	38th	39th	21st	—N/a	—N/a	—N/a

*During Olympic seasons competitions are only held for those events not included in the Olympic program.
**The single mixed relay was added as an event in 2019.

=== World Cup ===
==== Individual podiums ====
- 2 podiums (1 In, 1 Sp)

No.	Season	Date	Location	Level	Race	Place
1	2021–22	21 January 2022	(Italy) Antholz-Anterselva	World Cup	Individual	3rd
2	2023–24	12 January 2024	(Germany) Ruhpolding	World Cup	Sprint	2nd
