= Hannah Auchentaller =

Italian biathlete (born 2001)

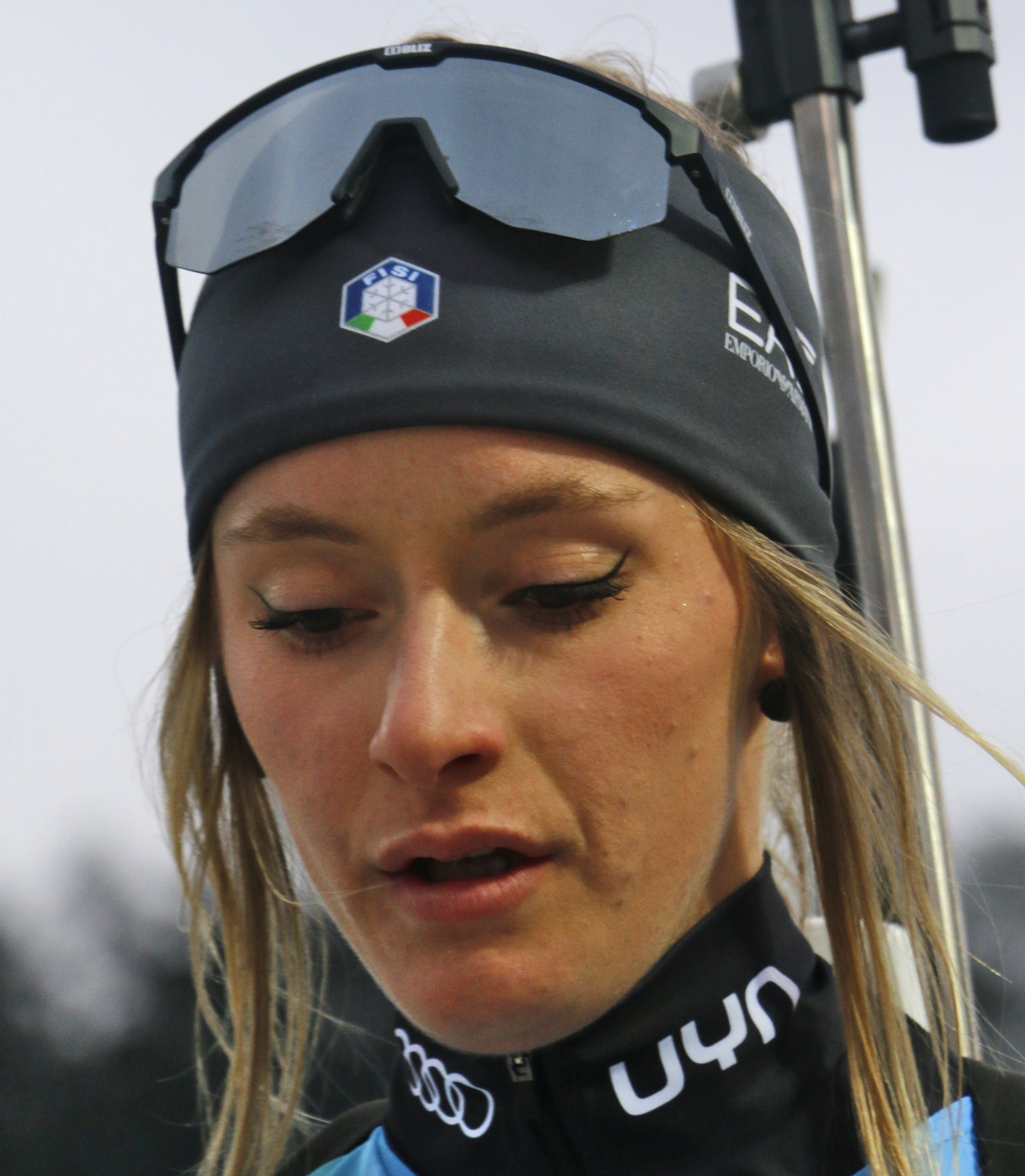
- Hannah Auchentaller in 2023

Personal information
- Nationality: Italian
- Born: 28 February 2001 (age 25) Innichen, Italy

Sport

Professional information
- Sport: Biathlon
- Club: CS Carabinieri
- World Cup debut: 2022

World Championships
- Teams: 1 (2023–)
- Medals: 1 (1 gold)
Medal record
Women's biathlon
Representing Italy
Event	1st	2nd	3rd
Olympic Games	0	0	0
World Championships	1	0	0
Total	1	0	0
World Championships
Gold medal – first place	2023 Oberhof	4 × 6 km relay
European Championships
Bronze medal – third place	2024 Osrblie	Mixed relay
Junior World Championships
Gold medal – first place	2022 Soldier Hollow	4 × 6 km relay
Silver medal – second place	2021 Obertilliach	4 × 6 km relay
Silver medal – second place	2022 Soldier Hollow	10 km pursuit
Youth World Championships
Silver medal – second place	2020 Lenzerheide	3 × 6 km relay

Hannah Auchentaller (born 28 March 2001) is an Italian biathlete. She competes in the Biathlon World Cup, Auchentaller has won a gold medal in 4 × 6 km team relay event at the Biathlon World Championships 2023 in Oberhof, Germany.

Hannah Auchentaller's first international appearance was at the Junior World Championships in 2019, where the best result was 6th place in the youth relay. She won her first international level medal at the 2020 Junior World Championships in Lenzerheide with Linda Zingerle and Rebecca Passler in the women's team relay event.

In the 2022–2023 season she took her first points in the World Cup, finishing 33rd in the pursuit race in Anterselva. At the 2023 World Championships in Oberhof, her first world championship presence, she won the gold medal in the relay with Samuela Comola, Dorothea Wierer and Lisa Vittozzi. In addition, she placed 33rd in the sprint, 32nd in the pursuit, 29th in the mass start and 22nd in the individual.

== Biathlon results ==
All results are sourced from the International Biathlon Union. Updated on 30 March 2023

=== Olympic Games ===
0 medals

Year	Age	Individual	Sprint	Pursuit	Mass start	Relay	Mixed relay
(Italy) 2026 Milano Cortina	24	30th	43rd	26th	—	11th	—

=== World Championships ===
1 medal (1 gold)

Year	Age	Individual	Sprint	Pursuit	Mass start	Relay	Mixed relay	Single mixed relay
(Germany) 2023 Oberhof	21	22nd	33rd	32nd	29th	Gold	–	–
(Switzerland) 2025 Lenzerheide	23	21st	46th	40th	—	7th	7th	–

=== Youth and Junior World Championships ===
Year	Age	Individual	Sprint	Pursuit	Relay
(Switzerland) 2020 Lenzerheide	18	9th	7th	35th	Silver
(Austria) 2021 Obertilliach	19	19th	12th	23rd	Silver
(United States) 2022 Soldier Hollow	20	8th	7th	Silver	Gold

=== World Cup ===
Season	Age	Overall	Individual	Sprint	Pursuit	Mass start
2022–23	21	57th	39th	—	53rd	39th
2023–24	22	60th	41st	80th	—	34th
2024–25	23	40th	—	28th	41st	39th
2025–26	24	45th	29th	68th	45th	38th

==== Relay podiums ====
No.	Season	Date	Location	Level	Placement	Teammate
1	2022–23	18 February 2023	(Germany) Oberhof	World Championships	Gold	Comola, Wierer, Vittozzi
2	2025–26	29 November 2025	(Sweden) Östersund	World Cup	2nd	Wierer, Carrara, Vittozzi
