= Elisa Gasparin =

Swiss biathlete (born 1991)

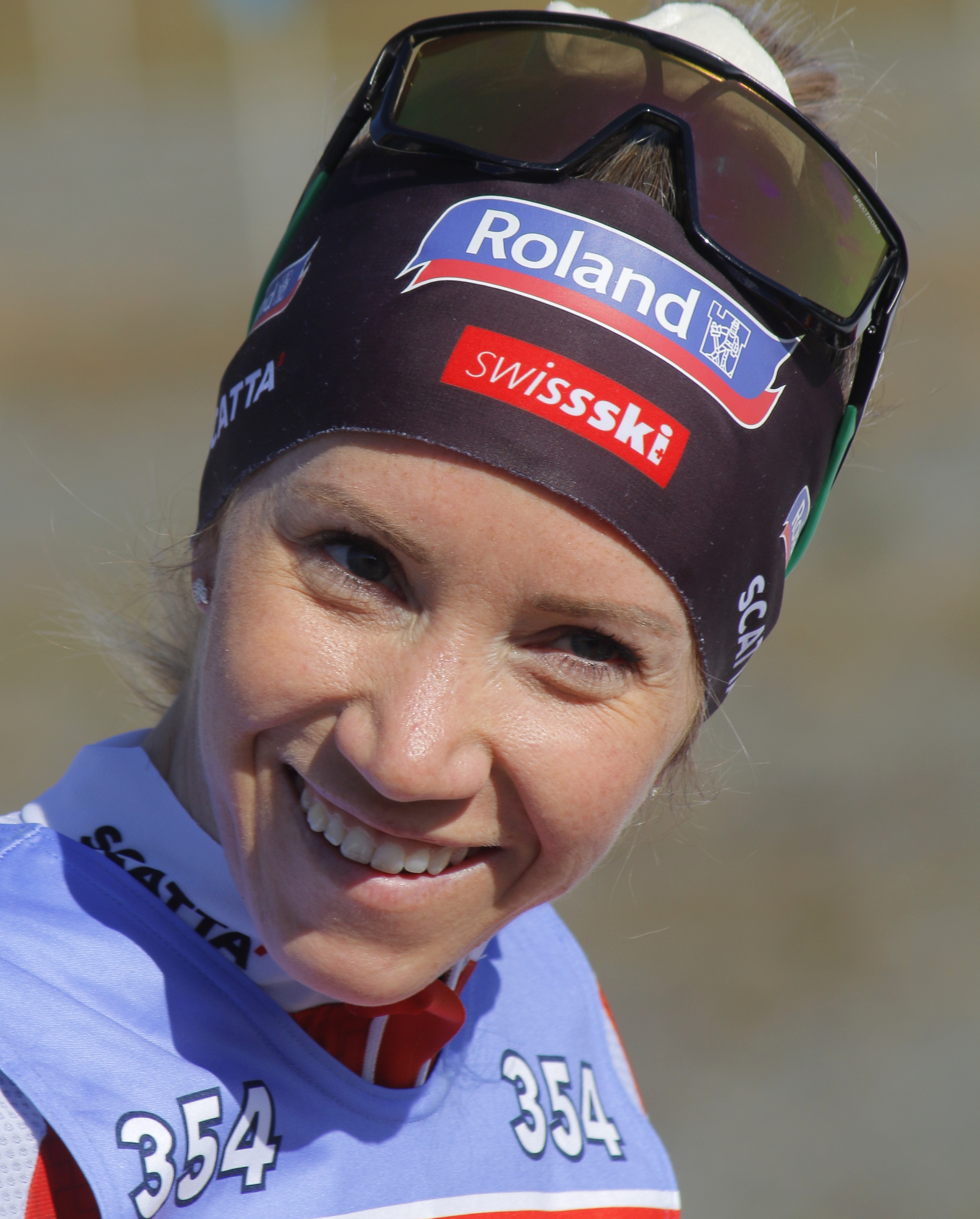
- Gasparin in 2023

Personal information
- Born: 2 December 1991 (age 34)
- Height: 1.59 m (5 ft 3 in)
- Weight: 50 kg (110 lb)

Sport
- Country: Switzerland
Medal record
European Championships
Bronze medal – third place	2022 Arber	Mixed relay

Elisa Gasparin (born 2 December 1991) is a former Swiss biathlete. Gasparin competed at the 2014 Winter Olympics. She was 56th at the 2012–13 Biathlon World Cup.

She is the sister of fellow biathletes Selina Gasparin and Aita Gasparin.

== Biathlon results ==
All results are sourced from the International Biathlon Union.

=== Olympic Games ===
0 medals

Event	Individual	Sprint	Pursuit	Mass start	Relay	Mixed relay
(Russia) 2014 Sochi	33rd	8th	31st	DNF	8th	12th
(South Korea) 2018 Pyeongchang	8th	31st	35th	27th	6th	13th

=== World Championships ===
0 medals

Event	Individual	Sprint	Pursuit	Mass start	Relay	Mixed relay	Single mixed relay
(Austria) 2017 Hochfilzen	46th	77th	—	—	13th	—	—
(Sweden) 2019 Östersund	21st	19th	29th	29th	13th	11th	—
(Italy) 2020 Rasen-Antholz	74th	50th	16th	—	6th	—	—
(Slovenia) 2021 Pokljuka	19th	27th	28th	21st	12th	—	—
(Germany) 2023 Oberhof	53rd	50th	28th	—	8th	7th	—
(Czech Republic) 2024 Nové Město na Moravě	50th	49th	38th	—	9th	—	—
(Switzerland) 2025 Lenzerheide	62nd	37th	38th	—	14th	—	—

*During Olympic seasons competitions are only held for those events not included in the Olympic program.
**The single mixed relay was added as an event in 2019.
