= Emma Lunder =

Canadian biathlete

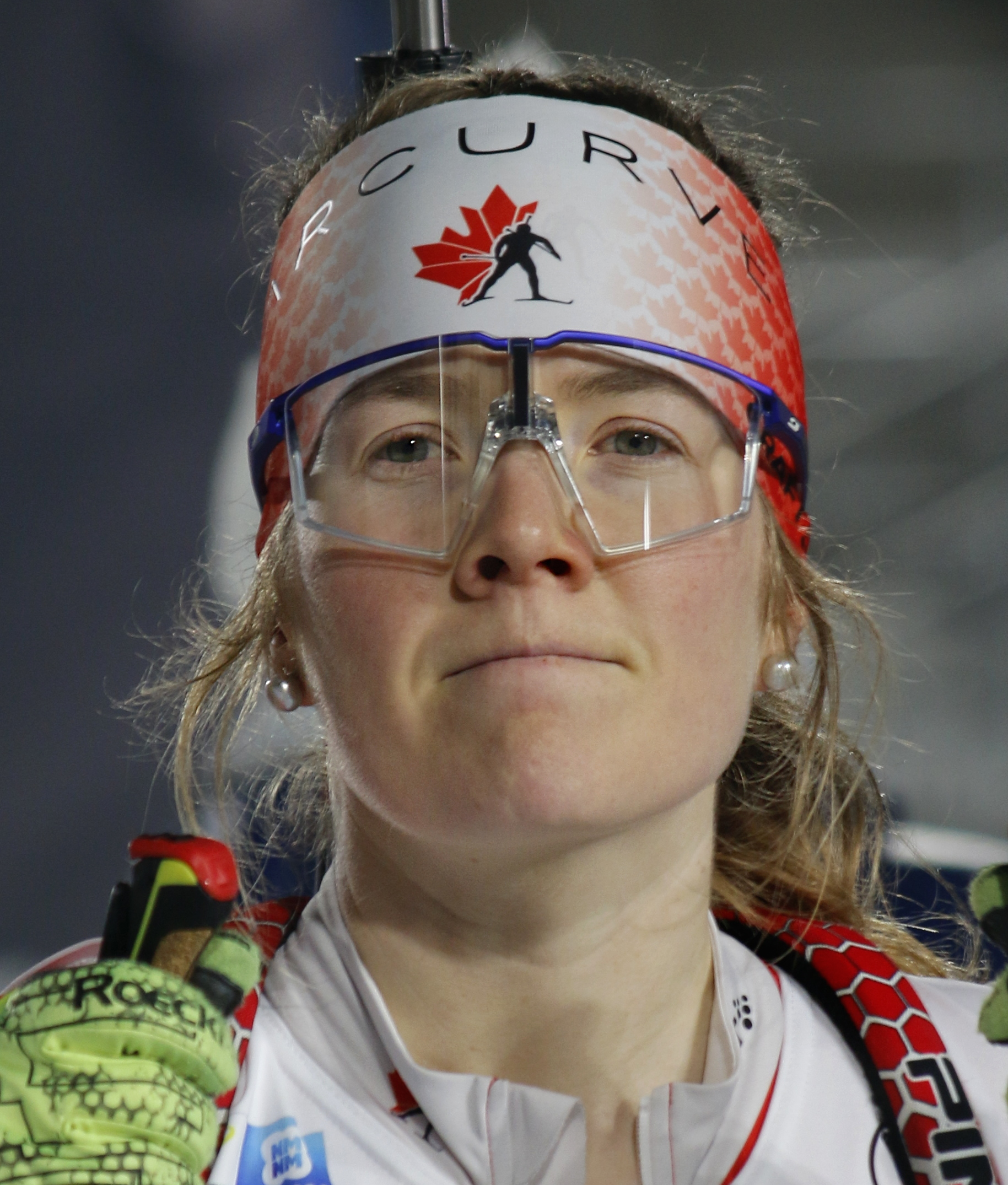
- Lunder in 2024

Personal information
- Born: September 2, 1991 (age 35) North Vancouver, Canada
- Height: 165 cm (5 ft 5 in)
- Weight: 54 kg (119 lb)

Sport
- Country: Canada
- Sport: Biathlon

Emma Lunder (born September 2, 1991) is a former Canadian biathlete from North Vancouver, British Columbia.

== Career ==
=== Olympics ===
In January 2018, Lunder was named to Canada's 2018 Olympic team.

In January 2022, Lunder was named to Canada's 2022 Olympic team.

=== IBU Cup ===
During the 2015–16 Biathlon IBU Cup series, Lunder won a silver medal in the 7.5 sprint race in Canmore, Alberta.

== Biathlon results ==
All results are sourced from the International Biathlon Union.

=== Olympic Games ===
Event	Individual	Sprint	Pursuit	Mass start	Relay	Mixed relay
(South Korea) 2018 Pyeongchang	54th	54th	53rd	—	10th	—
(China) 2022 Beijing	67th	32nd	54th	—	10th	14th

=== World Championships ===
Event	Individual	Sprint	Pursuit	Mass start	Relay	Mixed relay	Single mixed relay
(Austria) 2017 Hochfilzen	64th	84th	—	—	16th	—	—
(Sweden) 2019 Östersund	26th	51st	Lapped	—	14th	—	15th
(Italy) 2020 Rasen-Antholz	35th	35th	41st	—	9th	14th	8th
(Slovenia) 2021 Pokljuka	22nd	42nd	20th	17th	16th	8th	8th
(Germany) 2023 Oberhof	25th	11th	30th	7th	11th	8th	13th
(Czech Republic) 2024 Nové Město na Moravě	41st	69th	—	—	12th	13th	21st
(Switzerland) 2025 Lenzerheide	54th	25th	27th	—	20th	20th	18th

*During Olympic seasons competitions are only held for those events not included in the Olympic program.
