= Janina Hettich-Walz =

German biathlete (born 1996)

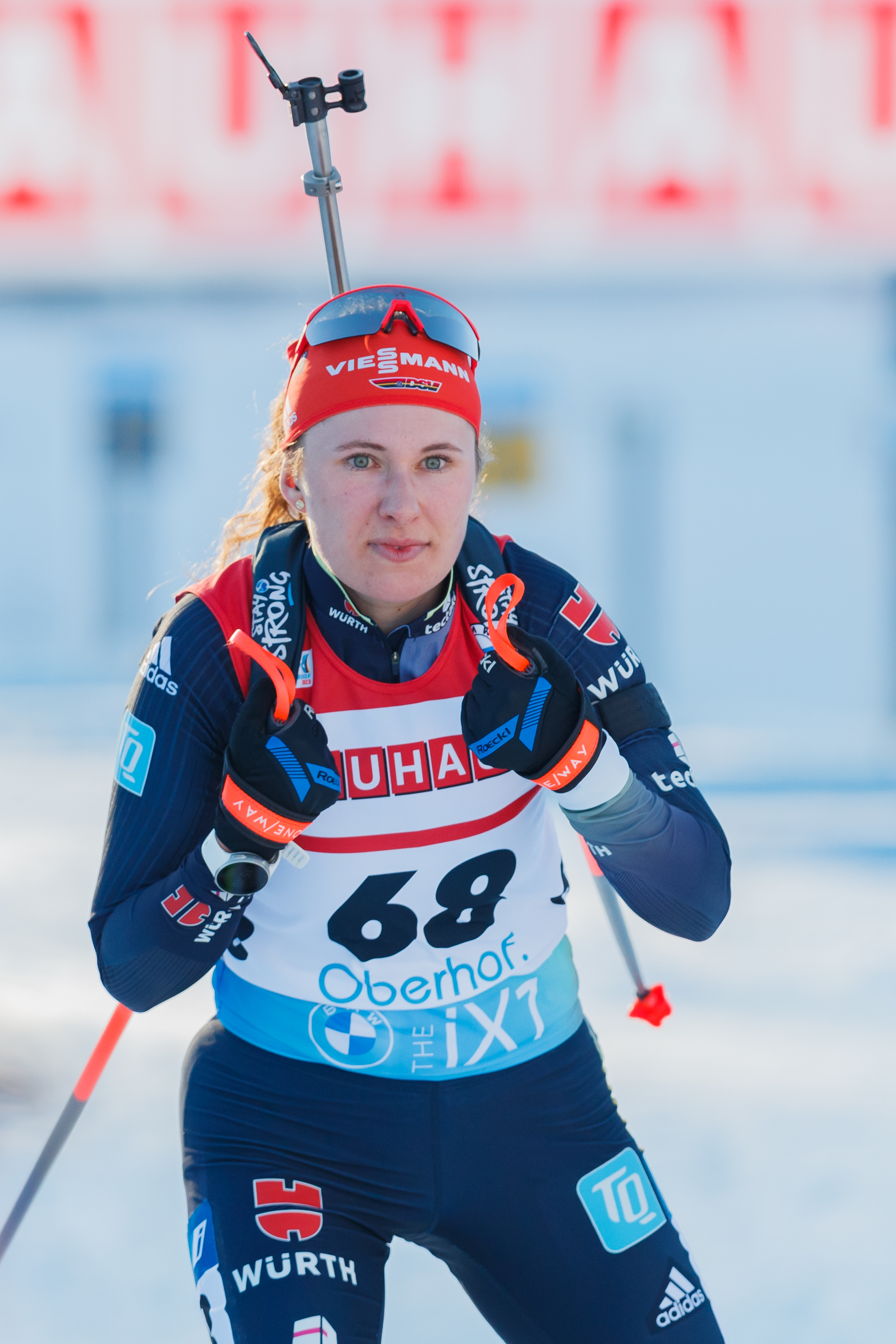
- Hettich-Walz in 2023

Personal information
- Nationality: German
- Born: 16 June 1996 (age 30) Schramberg, Germany
- Height: 1.62 m (5 ft 4 in)
- Weight: 53 kg (117 lb)

Sport

Professional information
- Sport: Biathlon
- Club: SC Schönwald
- World Cup debut: 2018

World Championships
- Teams: 4 (2020–2024)
- Medals: 3 (0 gold)

World Cup
- Seasons: 6 (2018/19–)
- Individual victories: 0
- All victories: 1
- Individual podiums: 0
- All podiums: 8
- Overall titles: 0
- Discipline titles: 0
Medal record
Women's biathlon
Representing Germany
Event	1st	2nd	3rd
World Championships	0	2	1
Total	0	2	1
World Championships
Silver medal – second place	2021 Pokljuka	4 x 6 km relay
Silver medal – second place	2024 Nové Město	15 km individual
Bronze medal – third place	2024 Nové Město	4 × 6 km relay
European Championships
Silver medal – second place	2019 Raubichi	Mixed relay
Silver medal – second place	2022 Arber	10 km pursuit
Silver medal – second place	2022 Arber	Mixed relay
Bronze medal – third place	2022 Arber	7.5 km sprint

Janina Hettich-Walz (née Hettich; born 16 June 1996) is a German biathlete. She won a silver medal at the 2024 Biathlon World Championships in individual race and a team silver medal at the 2021 World Championships in relay.

== Biathlon results ==
All results are sourced from the International Biathlon Union.

=== World Championships ===
3 medals (2 silver, 1 bronze)

Year	Individual	Sprint	Pursuit	Mass start	Relay	Mixed relay	Single mixed relay
(Italy) 2020 Antholz	—	65th	—	—	—	—	—
(Slovenia) 2021 Pokljuka	—	31st	34th	—	Silver	—	—
(Germany) 2023 Oberhof	42nd	23rd	20th	—	—	—	—
(Czech Republic) 2024 Nové Město	Silver	35th	25th	28th	Bronze		

*During Olympic seasons competitions are only held for those events not included in the Olympic program.
