= Tuuli Tomingas =

Estonian biathlete (born 1995)

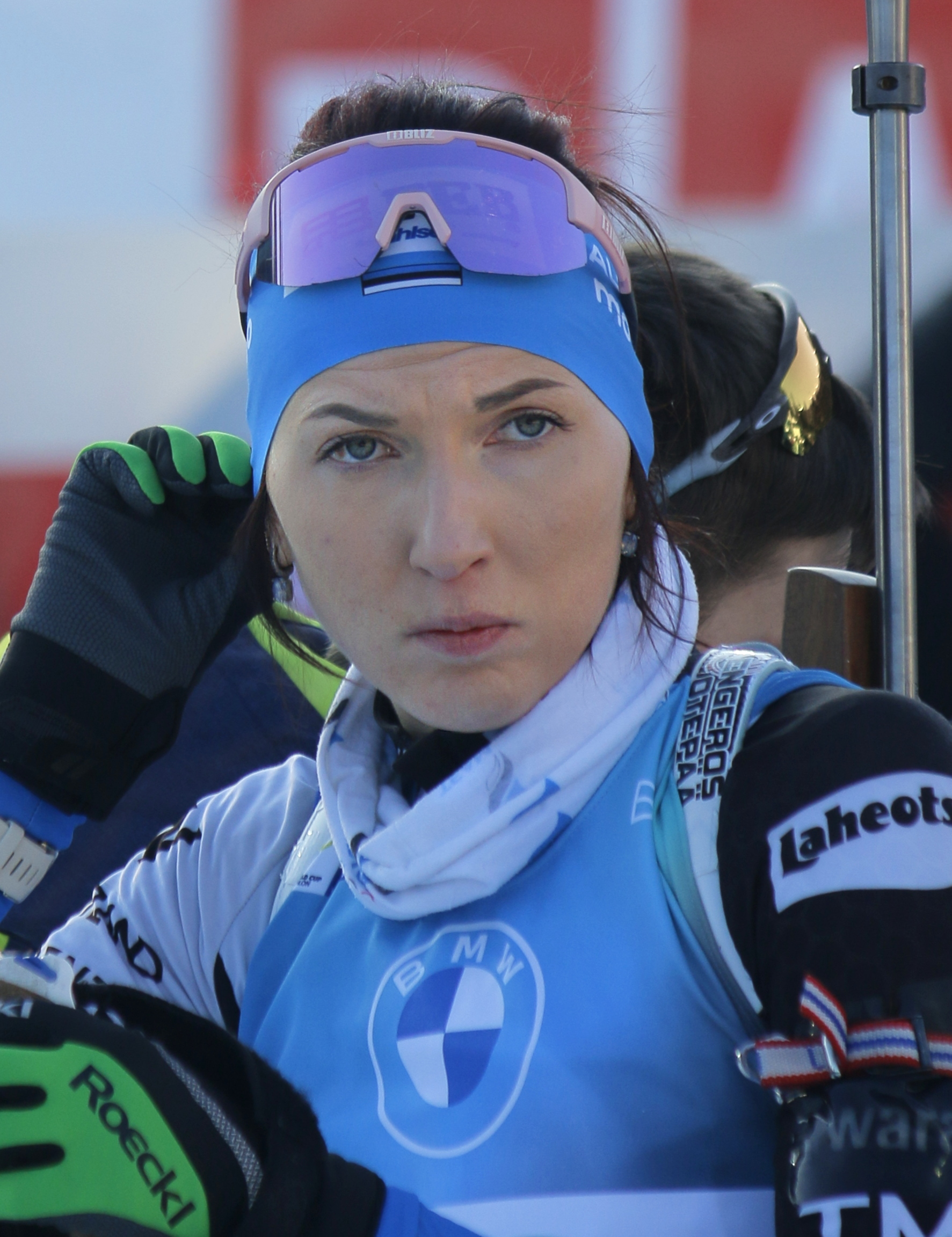
- Tuuli Tomingas in Nové Město, 2023

Personal information
- Born: 4 January 1995 (age 31) Tallinn, Estonia

Sport

Professional information
- World Cup debut: 12 Jan 2017 (in relay); 13 Mar 2014 (in indiv.)

World Championships
- Teams: 3 (2019–2021)

World Cup
- Seasons: 3 (2018-19–)
- Individual races: 46
- All races: 71
- Individual victories: 0
- All victories: 0
- Individual podiums: 0
- All podiums: 0
Medal record
Women's biathlon
Representing Estonia
Event	1st	2nd	3rd
Olympic Games	0	0	0
World Championships	0	0	0
European Championships	1	0	1
Total	1	0	1
European Championships
Gold medal – first place	2014 Nove Mesto	7.5 km sprint
Bronze medal – third place	2014 Nove Mesto	Mixed Relay
- Updated on 18 February 2024

Tuuli Tomingas (born 4 January 1995) is an Estonian biathlete. She competes in the Biathlon World Cup.

Tomingas achieved her best result in the Biathlon World Cup at Soldier Hollow, Utah, where she finished 6th in pursuit during the 2023-24 season.

== Biathlon results ==
All results are sourced from the International Biathlon Union.

=== Olympic Games ===
Event	Individual	Sprint	Pursuit	Mass start	Relay	Mixed relay
(China) 2022 Beijing	43rd	33rd	49th	—	15th	16th
(Italy) 2026 Milano Cortina	57th	57th	DNF	—	14th	—

=== World Championships ===
Event	Individual	Sprint	Pursuit	Mass start	Relay	Mixed relay	Single mixed relay
(Sweden) 2019 Östersund	25th	50th	28th	—	12th	—	11th
(Italy) 2020 Antholz-Anterselva	78th	75th	—	—	DSQ	—	—
(Slovenia) 2021 Pokljuka	75th	45th	59th	—	17th	19th	—
(Germany) 2023 Oberhof	6th	40th	34th	20th	10th	15th	9th
(Czech Republic) 2024 Nove Mesto	DSQ*	24th	10th	8th	4th	12th	—
(Switzerland) 2025 Lenzerheide	7th	32nd	20th	9th	10th	—	—

*If she had not been disqualified, she would have been in 11th place

=== World Cup ===
Season	Overall		Individual		Sprint		Pursuit		Mass start	
Season	Points	Position	Points	Position	Points	Position	Points	Position	Points	Position
2018-19	111	49th	20	45th	51	51st	40	47th	—	—
2019-20	Didn't earn World Cup point									
2020-21	120	50th	15	50th	82	37th	7	69th	16	44th
2021-22	100	47th	18	39th	47	46th	35	46th	0	-
2022-23	101	46th	31	27th	33	54th	8	62nd	29	33rd
2023-24	303	23rd	32	34th	99	20th	97	20th	67	15th
2024-25	Didn't earn World Cup point									
2025-26	15	40th	7	34th	8	33rd	0	-	0	-

*Results are from IBU races which include the Biathlon World Cup, Biathlon World Championships and the Winter Olympic Games.

Updated on 22 March 2021

=== Other competition ===
==== European Championships ====
Event	Level	Individual	Sprint	Pursuit	Mixed relay	Single mixed relay	Super sprint
(Slovakia) 2012 Brezno	Junior	30th	47th	LAP	—	—N/a	—N/a
(Bulgaria) 2013 Bansko	Junior	—	4th	DSQ	8th	—N/a	—N/a
(Czech Republic) 2014 Nové Město	Junior	—	1st	15th	3rd	—N/a	—N/a
(Estonia) 2015 Otepää	Junior	8th	37th	26th	5th	—N/a	—N/a
(Slovenia) 2016 Pokljuka	Junior	27th	28th	20th	—N/a	—N/a	—N/a
(Italy) 2018 Ridnaun	Senior	57th	82nd	—	—	—	—N/a
(Belarus) 2020 Minsk	Senior	—N/a	47th	DNS	—	17th	27th

==== Junior/Youth World Championships ====
Event	Level	Individual	Sprint	Pursuit	Relay
(Italy) 2013 Obertilliach	Youth	10th	10th	32nd	4th
(United States) 2014 Presque Isle	Youth	38th	12th	5th	4th
(Belarus) 2015 Minsk	Junior	46th	43rd	30th	11th
(Romania) 2016 Cheile Grădiştei	Junior	DNF	29th	30th	9th
