= Biathlon World Championships 2023 =

Event held in Oberhof, Germany

- Host city: Oberhof
- Country: Germany
- Events: 12
- Opening: 8 February
- Closing: 19 February
- Website: Website

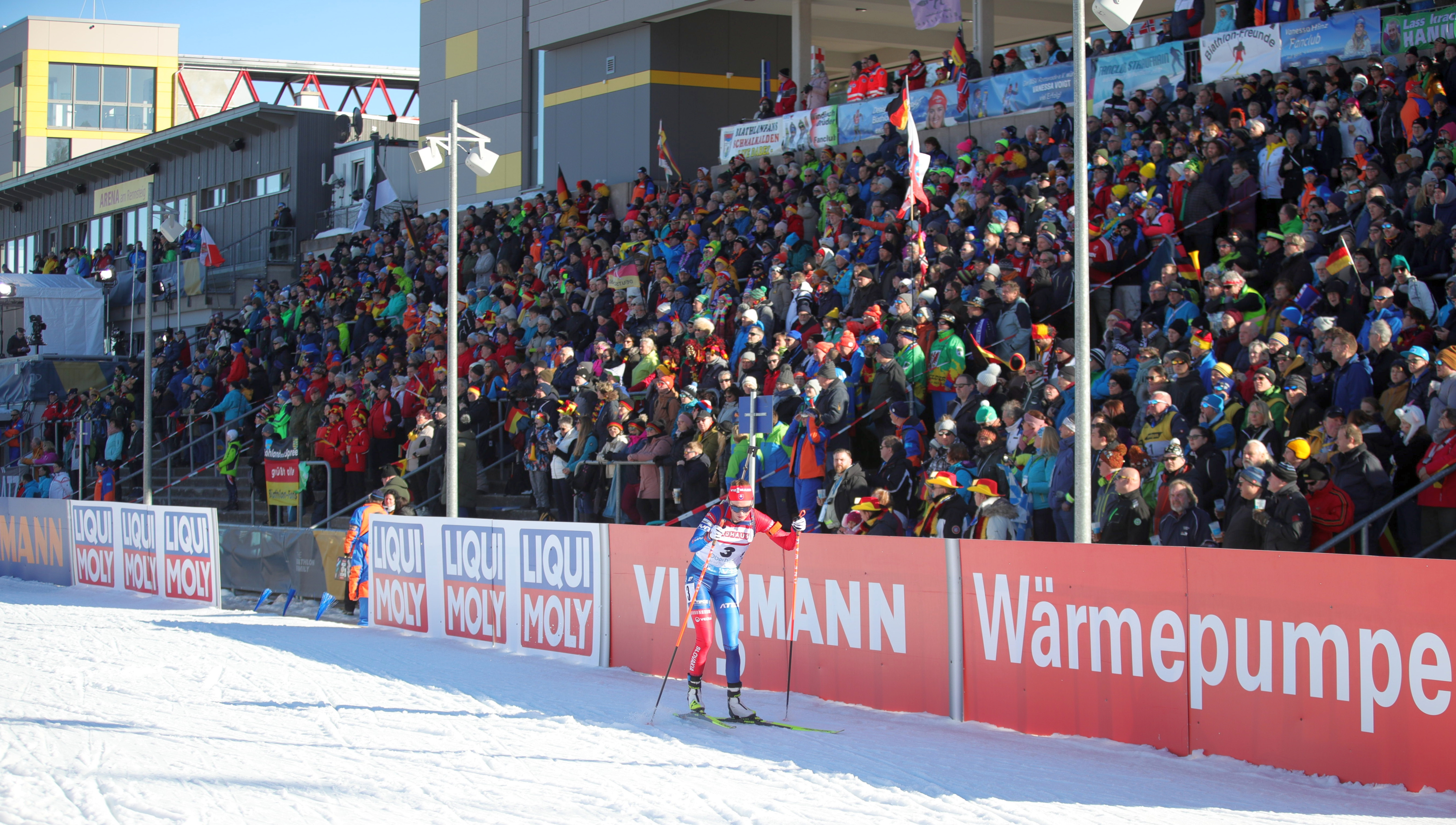

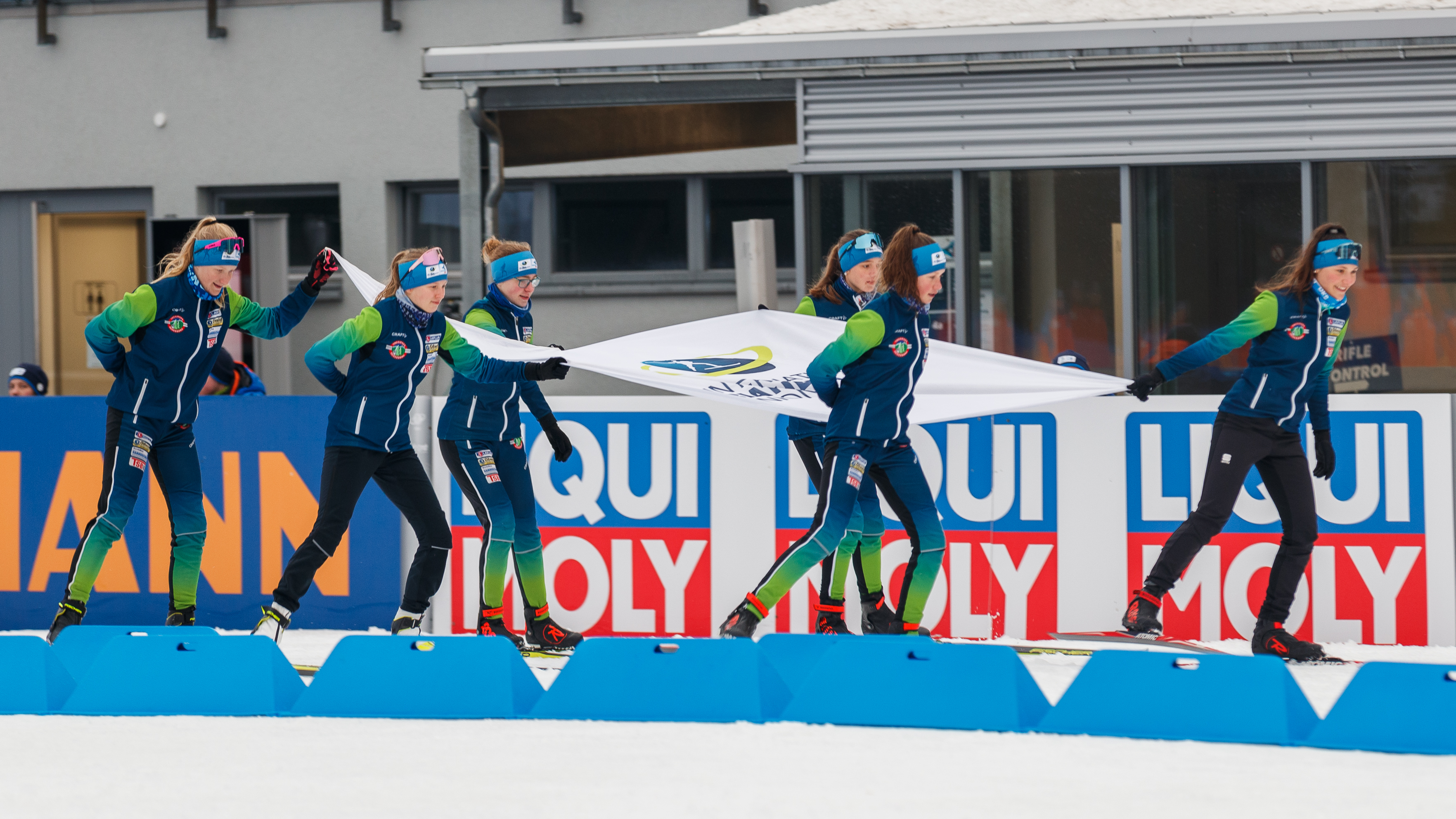
2023-02-19 IBU World Championships Biathlon Oberhof 2023 1DX 6968 by Stepro

The Biathlon World Championships 2023 took place in Oberhof, Germany, from 8 to 19 February 2023.

== Schedule ==
All times are local (UTC+1).

Date	Time	Event
8 February	14:45	4 × 6 km W+M mixed relay
10 February	14:30	Women's 7.5 km sprint
11 February	14:30	Men's 10 km sprint
12 February	13:25	Women's 10 km pursuit
12 February	15:30	Men's 12.5 km pursuit
14 February	14:30	Men's 20 km individual
15 February	14:30	Women's 15 km individual
16 February	15:10	6 km W + 7.5 km M single mixed relay
18 February	11:45	Men's 4 × 7.5 km relay
18 February	15:00	Women's 4 × 6 km relay
19 February	12:30	Men's 15 km mass start
19 February	15:15	Women's 12.5 km mass start

== Medal summary ==
=== Medal table ===
* Host nation (Germany)

Rank	Nation	Gold	Silver	Bronze	Total
1	Norway	5	5	3	13
2	Sweden	3	3	5	11
3	France	2	0	2	4
4	Germany*	1	2	0	3
5	Italy	1	1	2	4
6	Austria	0	1	0	1
Totals (6 entries)		12	12	12	36

=== Men ===
Event	Gold		Silver		Bronze	
10 km sprint	Johannes Thingnes Bø; Norway	23:21.7 (1+0)	Tarjei Bø; Norway	23:36.5 (0+0)	Sturla Holm Lægreid; Norway	24:01.6 (0+1)
12.5 km pursuit	Johannes Thingnes Bø; Norway	33:34.5 (0+0+0+0)	Sturla Holm Lægreid; Norway	34:45.7 (0+0+0+0)	Sebastian Samuelsson; Sweden	35:28.6 (0+0+0+2)
20 km individual	Johannes Thingnes Bø; Norway	49:57.5 (0+1+1+0)	Sturla Holm Lægreid; Norway	51:08.2 (0+0+0+1)	Sebastian Samuelsson; Sweden	51:08.6 (0+0+1+0)
4 × 7.5 km relay	France; Antonin Guigonnat; Fabien Claude; Émilien Jacquelin; Quentin Fillon Maillet	1:21:48.8 (0+0) (0+2) (0+1) (0+2) (0+0) (1+3) (0+1) (0+0)	Norway; Vetle Sjåstad Christiansen; Tarjei Bø; Sturla Holm Lægreid; Johannes Thingnes Bø	1:22:27.6 (0+2) (0+3) (0+0) (1+3) (0+0) (1+3) (0+3) (0+0)	Sweden; Peppe Femling; Martin Ponsiluoma; Jesper Nelin; Sebastian Samuelsson	1:23:28.7 (0+1) (1+3) (0+2) (0+1) (0+1) (0+1) (0+3) (0+1)
15 km mass start	Sebastian Samuelsson; Sweden	36:42.8 (0+0+0+0)	Martin Ponsiluoma; Sweden	36:53.4 (0+1+1+0)	Johannes Thingnes Bø; Norway	37:21.6 (1+1+0+1)

=== Women ===
Event	Gold		Silver		Bronze	
7.5 km sprint	Denise Herrmann-Wick; Germany	21:19.7 (0+0)	Hanna Öberg; Sweden	21:21.9 (0+0)	Linn Persson; Sweden	21:45.9 (0+0)
10 km pursuit	Julia Simon; France	32:00.8 (0+0+0+1)	Denise Herrmann-Wick; Germany	32:27.8 (1+0+1+2)	Marte Olsbu Røiseland; Norway	32:38.5 (1+1+1+0)
15 km individual	Hanna Öberg; Sweden	43:36.1 (1+0+0+0)	Linn Persson; Sweden	43:46.4 (0+0+0+0)	Lisa Vittozzi; Italy	44:04.1 (0+0+0+1)
4 × 6 km relay	Italy; Samuela Comola; Dorothea Wierer; Hannah Auchentaller; Lisa Vittozzi	1:14:39.7 (0+0) (0+0) (0+0) (0+1) (0+0) (0+1) (0+0) (0+0)	Germany; Vanessa Voigt; Hanna Kebinger; Sophia Schneider; Denise Herrmann-Wick	1:15:04.4 (0+0) (0+0) (0+2) (0+0) (0+1) (0+2) (0+0) (0+1)	Sweden; Linn Persson; Anna Magnusson; Elvira Öberg; Hanna Öberg	1:15:35.4 (0+2) (0+0) (0+1) (2+3) (0+1) (0+2) (0+2) (0+0)
12.5 km mass start	Hanna Öberg; Sweden	36:48.0 (1+1+0+0)	Ingrid Landmark Tandrevold; Norway	36:52.8 (0+1+0+0)	Julia Simon; France	37:08.8 (1+1+0+1)

=== Mixed ===
Event	Gold		Silver		Bronze	
4 × 6 km W+M relay	Norway; Ingrid Landmark Tandrevold; Marte Olsbu Røiseland; Sturla Holm Lægreid; Johannes Thingnes Bø	1:04:41.0 (0+0) (1+3) (0+0) (0+2) (0+0) (0+0) (0+3) (0+1)	Italy; Lisa Vittozzi; Dorothea Wierer; Didier Bionaz; Tommaso Giacomel	1:04:53.5 (0+0) (0+1) (0+0) (0+1) (0+1) (0+2) (0+0) (0+1)	France; Julia Simon; Anaïs Chevalier-Bouchet; Émilien Jacquelin; Quentin Fillon Maillet	1:05:37.8 (0+1) (0+0) (0+1) (0+0) (0+2) (0+2) (0+3) (0+0)
6 km W + 7.5 km M single relay	Norway; Marte Olsbu Røiseland; Johannes Thingnes Bø	35:37.1 (0+2) (0+0) (0+1) (0+0) (0+0) (0+0) (1+3) (0+0)	Austria; Lisa Theresa Hauser; David Komatz	35:50.9 (0+0) (0+1) (0+1) (0+0) (0+1) (0+1) (0+1) (0+1)	Italy; Lisa Vittozzi; Tommaso Giacomel	36:28.1 (0+0) (0+1) (0+1) (0+1) (0+0) (0+2) (0+1) (2+3)

=== By athlete ===
Rank	Nation	Gold	Silver	Bronze	Total
1	Johannes Thingnes Bø (NOR)	5	1	1	7
2	Hanna Öberg (SWE)	2	1	1	4
3	Marte Olsbu Røiseland (NOR)	2	0	1	3
4	Sturla Holm Lægreid (NOR)	1	3	1	5
5	Denise Herrmann-Wick (GER)	1	2	0	3
6	Lisa Vittozzi (ITA)	1	1	2	4
7	Dorothea Wierer (ITA)	1	1	0	2
7	Ingrid Landmark Tandrevold (NOR)	1	1	0	2
9	Sebastian Samuelsson (SWE)	1	0	3	4
10	Julia Simon (FRA)	1	0	2	3
11	Quentin Fillon Maillet (FRA)	1	0	1	2
11	Émilien Jacquelin (FRA)	1	0	1	2
13	Antonin Guigonnat (FRA)	1	0	0	1
13	Fabien Claude (FRA)	1	0	0	1
13	Hannah Auchentaller (ITA)	1	0	0	1
13	Samuela Comola (ITA)	1	0	0	1
17	Tarjei Bø (NOR)	0	2	0	2
18	Linn Persson (SWE)	0	1	2	3
19	Martin Ponsiluoma (SWE)	0	1	1	2
19	Tommaso Giacomel (ITA)	0	1	1	2
21	David Komatz (AUT)	0	1	0	1
21	Didier Bionaz (ITA)	0	1	0	1
21	Hanna Kebinger (GER)	0	1	0	1
21	Lisa Theresa Hauser (AUT)	0	1	0	1
21	Sophia Schneider (GER)	0	1	0	1
21	Vanessa Voigt (GER)	0	1	0	1
21	Vetle Sjåstad Christiansen (NOR)	0	1	0	1
28	Anaïs Chevalier-Bouchet (FRA)	0	0	1	1
28	Anna Magnusson (SWE)	0	0	1	1
28	Elvira Öberg (SWE)	0	0	1	1
28	Jesper Nelin (SWE)	0	0	1	1
28	Peppe Femling (SWE)	0	0	1	1
