= 2022–23 Biathlon World Cup – Sprint Men =

2022–23 Biathlon World Cup Men's Sprint standings

The 2022–23 Biathlon World Cup – Sprint Men started on 3 December 2022 in Kontiolahti and will conclude on 16 March 2023 in Oslo Holmenkollen.

== Competition format ==
The 10 kilometres (6.2 mi) sprint race is the third oldest biathlon event; the distance is skied over three laps. The biathlete shoots two times at any shooting lane, first prone, then standing, totalling 10 targets. For each missed target the biathlete has to complete a penalty lap of around 150 metres (490 ft). Competitors' starts are staggered, normally by 30 seconds.

== 2022–23 Top 3 standings ==
Medal	Athlete	Points
Gold:	(Norway) Johannes Thingnes Bø	450
Silver:	(Norway) Sturla Holm Lægreid	330
Bronze:	(Sweden) Martin Ponsiluoma	213

== Events summary ==
Event	Gold	Time	Silver	Time	Bronze	Time
Kontiolahti details	Johannes Thingnes Bø; Norway	23:09.0 (0+1)	Sturla Holm Lægreid; Norway	23:19.5 (0+0)	Roman Rees; Germany	23:37.8 (0+0)
Hochfilzen details	Johannes Thingnes Bø; Norway	23:04.0 (0+0)	Émilien Jacquelin; France	23:47.0 (0+1)	Sturla Holm Lægreid; Norway	23:50.9 (0+1)
Annecy-Le Grand-Bornand details	Johannes Thingnes Bø; Norway	22:52.2 (0+0)	Sturla Holm Lægreid; Norway	23:09.8 (0+0)	Benedikt Doll; Germany	23:31.0 (0+0)
Pokljuka details	Johannes Thingnes Bø; Norway	22:55.9 (1+0)	Tarjei Bø; Norway	24:44.0 (0+0)	Sturla Holm Lægreid; Norway	24:51.5 (1+0)
Antholz-Anterselva details	Johannes Thingnes Bø; Norway	22:44.1 (1+0)	Martin Ponsiluoma; Sweden	23:15.5 (1+0)	Sturla Holm Lægreid; Norway	23:21.4 (0+0)
Nové Město details	Johannes Thingnes Bø; Norway	22:39.6 (0+0)	Tarjei Bø; Norway	23:09.6 (0+0)	Vetle Sjåstad Christiansen; Norway	23:54.8 (0+1)
Oslo Holmenkollen details	Johannes Thingnes Bø; Norway	25:13.0 (0+1)	Martin Ponsiluoma; Sweden	25:36.9 (0+0)	Benedikt Doll; Germany	25:41.9 (0+0)

== Standings ==
Intermediate standings after 5 competitions.

#	Name	KON	HOC	LGB	POK	ANT	NOV	OSL	Total
1.	Johannes Thingnes Bø (NOR)	90	90	90	90	90	90	90	630
2.	Sturla Holm Lægreid (NOR)	75	60	75	60	60	DNS	45	375
3.	Martin Ponsiluoma (SWE)	28	40	50	20	75	40	75	328
4.	Benedikt Doll (GER)	30	27	60	50	29	29	60	285
5.	Vetle Sjåstad Christiansen (NOR)	31	28	31	28	45	60	34	257
6.	Tarjei Bø (NOR)	23	2	27	75	27	75	21	250
7.	Roman Rees (GER)	60	11	14	34	50	34	23	226
8.	Quentin Fillon Maillet (FRA)	27	36	34	32	21	27	36	213
9.	Michal Krčmář (CZE)	9	26	40	45	23	28	31	202
10.	Johannes Dale (NOR)	36	31	32	30	26	19	25	199
11.	Émilien Jacquelin (FRA)	45	75	28	0	40	–	–	188
12.	Fabien Claude (FRA)	26	15	36	4	31	45	22	179
13.	Antonin Guigonnat (FRA)	14	25	16	31	22	36	28	172
14.	Niklas Hartweg (SUI)	25	20	29	24	30	31	9	168
15.	Tommaso Giacomel (ITA)	0	21	20	40	36	15	27	159
16.	Sebastian Samuelsson (SWE)	50	22	24	16	11	26	–	149
17.	Jesper Nelin (SWE)	34	30	10	25	16	32	0	147
18.	Filip Fjeld Andersen (NOR)	40	50	26	26	0	–	–	142
19.	Andrejs Rastorgujevs (LAT)	–	45	0	21	20	0	50	136
20.	Justus Strelow (GER)	24	32	0	0	32	25	5	118
21.	Jakov Fak (SLO)	20	16	12	29	12	DNS	24	113
22.	Florent Claude (BEL)	15	24	15	23	17	17	0	111
23.	Simon Eder (AUT)	0	0	–	27	34	16	30	107
24.	Johannes Kühn (GER)	29	7	7	0	0	21	40	104
25.	Timofey Lapshin (KOR)	–	15	45	36	0	0	0	96
26.	Sebastian Stalder (SUI)	0	18	21	22	25	0	10	96
27.	Sean Doherty (USA)	21	0	30	0	–	23	12	86
28.	Tero Seppälä (FIN)	10	23	0	–	18	12	19	82
29.	David Zobel (GER)	32	0	19	0	8	3	15	77
30.	Vytautas Strolia (LTU)	19	29	6	13	6	0	0	73
#	Name	KON	HOC	LGB	POK	ANT	NOV	OSL	Total
31.	Philipp Nawrath (GER)	12	13	–	–	2	11	32	70
32.	Adam Runnalls (CAN)	22	1	0	–	28	–	16	67
33.	Olli Hiidensalo (FIN)	8	20	18	2	15	–	4	67
34.	David Komatz (AUT)	2	0	4	0	0	30	20	56
35.	Philipp Horn (GER)	–	–	22	12	–	–	17	51
36.	Endre Strømsheim (NOR)	–	–	–	–	–	50	0	50
37.	Artem Pryma (UKR)	11	0	23	–	10	6	0	50
38.	Otto Invenius (FIN)	–	–	–	–	–	18	29	47
39.	Anton Dudchenko (UKR)	0	3	13	DNS	0	24	0	40
40.	Serafin Wiestner (SUI)	–	–	0	18	20	0	0	38
41.	Felix Leitner (AUT)	0	12	25	0	–	–	–	37
42.	Christian Gow (CAN)	0	5	DNS	–	24	0	6	35
43.	Jakub Štvrtecký (CZE)	0	34	0	0	0	0	0	34
44.	Campbell Wright (NZL)	18	0	0	9	4	–	0	31
45.	Anton Vidmar (SLO)	0	0	0	0	0	4	26	30
46.	Thierry Langer (BEL)	17	0	0	0	0	13	0	30
47.	Vladimir Iliev (BUL)	0	8	0	0	0	14	7	29
48.	Rene Zahkna (EST)	0	6	0	0	0	22	–	28
49.	Éric Perrot (FRA)	7	0	0	–	DNS	20	0	27
50.	Émilien Claude (FRA)	6	0	17	0	–	–	–	23
51.	Emil Nykvist (SWE)	0	9	0	14	0	0	–	23
52.	Miha Dovžan (SLO)	–	0	0	19	3	0	0	22
53.	Peppe Femling (SWE)	0	17	3	1	0	0	0	21
54.	Karol Dombrovski (LTU)	0	0	0	6	14	0	0	20
55.	Tomáš Mikyska (CZE)	0	4	11	–	0	2	3	20
56.	Vebjørn Sørum (NOR)	–	–	–	–	–	–	18	18
57.	Didier Bionaz (ITA)	0	0	0	17	0	0	0	17
58.	Mikito Tachizaki (JPN)	0	0	2	15	DNS	0	0	17
59.	Dmitrii Shamaev (ROU)	16	0	0	0	0	0	0	16
60.	Paul Schommer (USA)	–	0	0	3	13	–	–	16
#	Name	KON	HOC	LGB	POK	ANT	NOV	OSL	Total
61.	Lucas Fratzscher (GER)	–	–	–	–	–	–	14	14
62.	Michal Šíma (SVK)	13	0	1	0	0	0	0	14
63.	Tuomas Harjula (FIN)	0	0	5	0	9	–	0	14
64.	Einar Hedegart (NOR)	–	–	–	–	–	–	13	13
65.	George Colțea (ROU)	0	0	–	0	–	0	11	11
66.	Artem Tyshchenko (UKR)	–	–	–	11	0	–	0	11
67.	Lovro Planko (SLO)	0	10	–	0	0	–	0	10
68.	Jeremy Finello (SUI)	0	0	0	10	0	DNS	–	10
69.	Krešimir Crnković (CRO)	–	0	0	0	–	10	DNS	10
70.	Joscha Burkhalter (SUI)	0	0	9	–	0	1	0	10
71.	Alex Cisar (SLO)	3	0	0	0	7	0	–	10
72.	Dmytro Pidruchnyi (UKR)	–	–	–	–	–	9	–	9
73.	Grzegorz Guzik (POL)	0	0	8	0	1	–	–	9
74.	Jake Brown (USA)	0	–	0	0	–	–	8	8
75.	Jonáš Mareček (CZE)	0	0	0	8	–	0	0	8
76.	Vladislav Kireyev (KAZ)	0	0	0	–	–	8	0	8
77.	Pavel Magazeev (MDA)	0	DSQ	0	0	0	7	1	8
78.	Malte Stefansson (SWE)	–	–	–	7	0	0	0	7
79.	Adam Václavík (CZE)	–	–	–	0	0	5	2	7
80.	Bogdan Tsymbal (UKR)	5	0	0	0	–	0	0	5
81.	Patrick Braunhofer (ITA)	0	–	–	5	0	0	0	5
82.	Dominic Unterweger (AUT)	–	–	–	–	5	–	0	5
83.	Václav Červenka (USA)	4	0	0	0	0	0	–	4
84.	Taras Lesiuk (UKR)	1	0	DNS	0	0	–	–	1
