= 2022–23 Biathlon World Cup – Overall Men =

In the men's 2022–23 Biathlon World Cup total score, for each participating athlete the points earned in all Individual, Sprint, Pursuit and Mass start competitions held during the season are added up to give that athlete's final score. This does not include the results from the Biathlon World Championships 2023 (held between the World Cup stages in Antholz-Anterselva and Nové Město).

== 2022–23 Top 3 standings ==
Medal	Athlete	Points
Gold:	(Norway) Johannes Thingnes Bø	1139
Silver:	(Norway) Sturla Holm Lægreid	920
Bronze:	(Norway) Vetle Sjåstad Christiansen	588

== Events summary ==
Event	Winner	Second	Third
Kontiolahti 20 km Individual details	Martin Ponsiluoma; Sweden	Niklas Hartweg; Switzerland	David Zobel; Germany
Kontiolahti 10 km Sprint details	Johannes Thingnes Bø; Norway	Sturla Holm Lægreid; Norway	Roman Rees; Germany
Kontiolahti 12.5 km Pursuit details	Johannes Thingnes Bø; Norway	Sturla Holm Lægreid; Norway	Émilien Jacquelin; France
Hochfilzen 10 km Sprint details	Johannes Thingnes Bø; Norway	Émilien Jacquelin; France	Sturla Holm Lægreid; Norway
Hochfilzen 12.5 km Pursuit details	Johannes Thingnes Bø; Norway	Sturla Holm Lægreid; Norway	Émilien Jacquelin; France
Annecy-Le Grand-Bornand 10 km Sprint details	Johannes Thingnes Bø; Norway	Sturla Holm Lægreid; Norway	Benedikt Doll; Germany
Annecy-Le Grand-Bornand 12.5 km Pursuit details	Sturla Holm Lægreid; Norway	Vetle Sjåstad Christiansen; Norway	Johannes Thingnes Bø; Norway
Annecy-Le Grand-Bornand 15 km Mass Start details	Johannes Dale; Norway	Sturla Holm Lægreid; Norway	Johannes Thingnes Bø; Norway
Pokljuka 10 km Sprint details	Johannes Thingnes Bø; Norway	Tarjei Bø; Norway	Sturla Holm Lægreid; Norway
Pokljuka 12.5 km Pursuit details	Johannes Thingnes Bø; Norway	Quentin Fillon Maillet; France	Tarjei Bø; Norway
Ruhpolding 20 km Individual details	Johannes Thingnes Bø; Norway	Vetle Sjåstad Christiansen; Norway	Jakov Fak; Slovenia
Ruhpolding 15 km Mass Start details	Johannes Thingnes Bø; Norway	Vetle Sjåstad Christiansen; Norway	Sturla Holm Lægreid; Norway
Antholz-Anterselva 10 km Sprint details	Johannes Thingnes Bø; Norway	Martin Ponsiluoma; Sweden	Sturla Holm Lægreid; Norway
Antholz-Anterselva 12.5 km Pursuit details	Johannes Thingnes Bø; Norway	Sturla Holm Lægreid; Norway	Martin Ponsiluoma; Sweden
Nové Město 10 km Sprint			
Nové Město 12.5 km Pursuit			
Östersund 20 km Individual			
Östersund 15 km Mass Start			
Oslo Holmenkollen 10 km Sprint			
Oslo Holmenkollen 12.5 km Pursuit			
Oslo Holmenkollen 15 km Mass Start			

== Standings ==
Point system
Place	IN	SP	PU	MS
1	90			
2	75			
3	60			
4	50			
5	45			
6	40			
7	36			
8	34			
9	32			
10	31			
11	30			
12	29			
13	28			
14	27			
15	26			
16	25			
17	24			
18	23			
19	22			
20	21			
21	20			
22	19			18
23	18			16
24	17			14
25	16			12
26	15			10
27	14			8
28	13			6
29	12			4
30	11			2
31	10			—
32	9			—
33	8			—
34	7			—
35	6			—
36	5			—
37	4			—
38	3			—
39	2			—
40	1			—

In each event places 1 to 40 (1 to 30 in a Mass start) are awarded points, a victory being worth 90 points. The full point system is shown in the table on the right. In a Mass start event only 30 athletes are allowed to participate and the points awarded for ranks 22 to 30 differ from the system used in other events. Equal placings (ties) give an equal number of points. An athlete's total World Cup Score is the sum of all World Cup points earned in the season. Ties in this score are broken by comparing the tied athletes' number of victories. If this number is the same for the athletes in question, the number of second places is compared, and so on. If a tie cannot be broken by this procedure, it remains a tie.

Intermediate standings after 12 competitions

#	Name	KON IN	KON SP	KON PU	HOC SP	HOC PU	LGB SP	LGB PU	LGB MS	POK SP	POK PS	RUH IN	RUH MS	ANT SP	ANT PU	NOV SP	NOV PU	OST IN	OST MS	OSL SP	OSL PU	OSL MS	Total
1.	Johannes Thingnes Bø (NOR)	29	90	90	90	90	90	60	60	90	90	90	90	90	90								1139
2.	Sturla Holm Lægreid (NOR)	40	75	75	60	75	75	90	75	60	50	50	60	60	75								920
3.	Vetle Sjåstad Christiansen (NOR)	36	31	25	28	14	31	75	45	28	40	75	75	45	40								588
4.	Quentin Fillon Maillet (FRA)	26	27	31	36	50	34	36	30	32	75	32	25	21	28								483
5.	Martin Ponsiluoma (SWE)	90	28	5	40	31	50	19	10	20	21	8	10	75	60								467
6.	Johannes Dale (NOR)	25	36	0	31	34	32	25	90	30	34	29	23	26	45								460
7.	Benedikt Doll (GER)	21	30	29	27	23	60	23	36	50	30	40	26	29	31								455
8.	Tarjei Bø (NOR)	0	23	32	2	25	27	26	40	75	60	31	50	27	30								448
9.	Roman Rees (GER)	50	60	45	11	5	14	28	25	34	26	28	18	50	50								444
10.	Émilien Jacquelin (FRA)	13	45	60	75	60	28	11	27	0	–	–	45	40	27								431
11.	Fabien Claude (FRA)	32	26	36	15	30	36	50	50	4	28	22	31	31	18								409
12.	Niklas Hartweg (SUI)	75	25	24	20	45	29	DNS	–	24	31	30	24	30	36								393
13.	Sebastian Samuelsson (SWE)	45	50	50	22	32	24	40	2	16	22	11	36	11	23								384
14.	Tommaso Giacomel (ITA)	0	0	11	21	40	20	32	28	40	45	45	21	36	29								368
15.	Michal Krčmář (CZE)	28	9	18	26	29	40	30	20	45	20	34	16	23	24								362
16.	Jesper Nelin (SWE)	27	34	40	30	20	10	24	18	25	18	23	27	16	15								327
17.	Jakov Fak (SLO)	12	20	20	16	36	12	7	24	29	24	60	28	12	26								326
18.	Filip Fjeld Andersen (NOR)	18	40	26	50	21	26	45	32	26	36	0	2	0	0								322
19.	Sebastian Stalder (SUI)	22	0	0	18	17	21	27	34	22	23	14	32	25	34								289
20.	Florent Claude (BEL)	0	15	27	24	22	15	29	26	23	19	25	20	17	1								263
21.	Justus Strelow (GER)	24	24	28	32	15	0	16	23	0	0	0	34	32	25								253
22.	Vytautas Strolia (LTU)	34	19	30	29	DNF	6	20	16	13	11	9	40	6	10								243
23.	Antonin Guigonnat (FRA)	0	14	8	25	26	16	34	29	31	25	0	12	22	0								242
24.	David Zobel (GER)	60	32	34	0	0	19	3	22	0	–	18	14	8	21								231
25.	Simon Eder (AUT)	8	0	15	0	7	–	–	–	27	27	26	29	34	32								205
26.	Olli Hiidensalo (FIN)	30	8	14	20	19	18	13	6	2	10	21	6	15	22								204
27.	Timofey Lapshin (KOR)	–	–	0	15	10	45	14	14	36	32	0	30	0	–								196
28.	Andrejs Rastorgujevs (LAT)	DNS	–	–	45	6	0	–	–	21	6	36	22	20	20								176
29.	Johannes Kühn (GER)	15	29	12	7	4	7	9	–	0	29	24	8	0	16								160
30.	Felix Leitner (AUT)	0	0	13	12	28	25	15	21	0	9	–	–	–	–								123
#	Name	KON IN	KON SP	KON PU	HOC SP	HOC PU	LGB SP	LGB PU	LGB MS	POK SP	POK PS	RUH IN	RUH MS	ANT SP	ANT PU	NOV SP	NOV PU	OST IN	OST MS	OSL SP	OSL PU	OSL MS	Total
31.	Tero Seppälä (FIN)	6	10	0	23	24	0	21	–	–	–	–	–	18	5								107
32.	Artem Pryma (UKR)	DNS	11	0	0	–	23	31	4	–	–	–	–	10	17								96
33.	Tuomas Harjula (FIN)	0	–	0	0	27	5	22	31	0	–	0	–	9	0								94
34.	Sean Doherty (USA)	0	21	17	0	1	30	0	8	0	0	6	–	–	–								83
35.	Anton Dudchenko (UKR)	11	0	23	3	18	13	10	–	DNS	–	–	–	0	2								80
36.	Philipp Nawrath (GER)	23	12	19	13	0	–	–	–	–	–	3	–	2	7								79
37.	Émilien Claude (FRA)	4	6	0	0	0	17	17	12	0	–	16	–	–	–								72
38.	David Komatz (AUT)	7	2	22	0	0	4	0	–	0	–	27	4	0	0								66
39.	Christian Gow (CAN)	5	0	–	5	9	DNS	–	–	–	–	4	–	24	19								66
40.	Adam Runnalls (CAN)	0	22	DNS	1	0	0	0	–	–	–	0	–	28	13								64
41.	Miha Dovžan (SLO)	9	–	–	0	–	0	8	–	19	15	0	–	3	9								63
42.	Jakub Štvrtecký (CZE)	14	0	–	34	11	0	0	–	0	DNS	0	–	0	–								59
43.	Peppe Femling (SWE)	20	0	2	17	13	3	0	–	1	0	0	–	0	–								56
44.	Campbell Wright (NZL)	0	18	0	0	–	0	–	–	9	14	2	–	4	8								55
45.	Alex Cisar (SLO)	0	3	16	0	3	0	–	–	0	7	17	–	7	0								53
46.	Serafin Wiestner (SUI)	–	–	–	–	–	0	0	–	18	12	DNS	–	20	0								50
47.	Éric Perrot (FRA)	16	7	4	0	–	0	–	–	–	–	20	–	DNS	–								47
48.	Didier Bionaz (ITA)	DNS	0	0	0	0	0	–	–	17	17	0	–	0	12								46
49.	Vladimir Iliev (BUL)	19	0	–	8	16	0	–	–	0	–	0	–	0	0								43
50.	Jeremy Finello (SUI)	0	0	0	0	–	0	12	–	10	16	5	–	0	–								43
51.	Tomáš Mikyska (CZE)	0	0	9	4	12	11	5	–	–	–	–	–	0	–								41
52.	Paul Schommer (USA)	–	–	–	0	2	0	2	–	3	13	1	–	13	4								38
53.	Bogdan Tsymbal (UKR)	10	5	7	0	–	0	6	–	0	0	7	–	–	–								35
54.	Philipp Horn (GER)	–	–	–	–	–	22	0	–	12	0	–	–	–	–								34
55.	Erlend Bjøntegaard (NOR)	31	0	–	–	–	–	–	–	–	–	–	–	–	–								31
56.	Anton Vidmar (SLO)	0	0	6	0	0	0	0	–	0	2	19	–	0	–								27
57.	Joscha Burkhalter (SUI)	0	0	–	0	–	9	18	–	–	–	–	–	0	–								27
58.	Patrick Braunhofer (ITA)	17	0	–	–	–	–	–	–	5	5	0	–	0	–								27
59.	Mikito Tachizaki (JPN)	0	0	10	0	–	2	0	–	15	0	0	–	DNS	–								27
60.	Emil Nykvist (SWE)	3	0	–	9	0	0	LAP	–	14	1	0	–	0	LAP								27
#	Name	KON IN	KON SP	KON PU	HOC SP	HOC PU	LGB SP	LGB PU	LGB MS	POK SP	POK PS	RUH IN	RUH MS	ANT SP	ANT PU	NOV SP	NOV PU	OST IN	OST MS	OSL SP	OSL PU	OSL MS	Total
61.	Karol Dombrovski (LTU)	0	0	0	0	0	0	–	–	6	4	0	–	14	3								27
62.	Thierry Langer (BEL)	0	17	3	0	–	0	4	–	0	–	0	–	0	–								24
63.	Artem Tyshchenko (UKR)	–	–	–	–	–	–	–	–	11	0	13	–	0	–								24
64.	Jake Brown (USA)	DNS	0	21	–	–	0	–	–	0	0	0	–	–	–								21
65.	Grzegorz Guzik (POL)	0	0	–	0	–	8	0	–	0	–	0	–	1	11								20
66.	Dominic Unterweger (AUT)	–	–	–	–	–	–	–	–	–	–	0	–	5	14								19
67.	Dmitrii Shamaev (ROU)	0	16	0	0	–	0	0	–	0	0	0	–	0	DNS								16
68.	Denys Nasyko (UKR)	0	0	–	–	–	–	–	–	–	–	15	–	0	DNS								15
69.	Taras Lesiuk (UKR)	1	1	1	0	DNS	DNS	–	–	0	–	12	–	0	0								15
70.	Malte Stefansson (SWE)	–	–	–	–	–	–	–	–	7	8	0	–	0	–								15
71.	Michal Šíma (SVK)	0	13	0	0	–	1	0	–	0	0	0	–	0	–								14
72.	Lovro Planko (SLO)	–	0	0	10	0	–	–	–	0	–	–	–	0	–								10
73.	Raul Flore (ROU)	0	–	–	0	–	–	–	–	–	–	10	–	0	–								10
74.	Oscar Lombardot (FRA)	–	–	–	–	–	–	–	–	0	3	0	–	0	6								9
75.	Jonáš Mareček (CZE)	0	0	–	0	–	0	–	–	8	0	–	–	–	–								8
76.	Alexandr Mukhin (KAZ)	0	0	–	0	8	–	–	–	–	–	–	–	–	–								8
77.	Rene Zahkna (EST)	0	0	0	6	0	0	0	–	0	–	0	–	0	0								6
78.	Václav Červenka (USA)	0	4	0	0	–	0	–	–	0	–	–	–	0	LAP								4
79.	Patrick Jakob (AUT)	2	0	–	0	–	0	–	–	–	–	–	–	0	–								2
80.	Oskar Brandt (SWE)	0	0	–	0	–	0	1	–	–	–	–	–	–	–								1
