= 2022–23 Biathlon World Cup – Pursuit Men =

2022–23 Biathlon World Cup Men's Pursuit standings

The 2022–23 Biathlon World Cup – Pursuit Men started on 4 December 2022 in Kontiolahti and will conclude on 18 March 2023 in Oslo Holmenkollen.

== Competition format ==
The 12.5 kilometres (7.8 mi) pursuit race is skied over five laps. The biathlete shoots four times at any shooting lane, in the order of prone, prone, standing, standing, totalling 20 targets. For each missed target a biathlete has to run a 150 metres (490 ft) penalty loop. Competitors' starts are staggered, according to the result of the previous sprint race.

== 2022–23 Top 3 standings ==
Medal	Athlete	Points
Gold:	(Norway) Johannes Thingnes Bø	420
Silver:	(Norway) Sturla Holm Lægreid	365
Bronze:	(France) Quentin Fillon Maillet	220

== Events summary ==
Event	Gold	Time	Silver	Time	Bronze	Time
Kontiolahti details	Johannes Thingnes Bø; Norway	32:44.4 (0+0+1+2)	Sturla Holm Lægreid; Norway	33:03.6 (0+0+1+1)	Émilien Jacquelin; France	33:31.7 (0+0+0+2)
Hochfilzen details	Johannes Thingnes Bø; Norway	33:50.7 (0+1+0+1)	Sturla Holm Lægreid; Norway	34:38.6 (0+0+1+1)	Émilien Jacquelin; France	35:04.6 (0+1+1+1)
Annecy-Le Grand-Bornand details	Sturla Holm Lægreid; Norway	29:44.1 (0+0+1+0)	Vetle Sjåstad Christiansen; Norway	30:08.7 (0+0+0+2)	Johannes Thingnes Bø; Norway	30:19.9 (1+0+1+0)
Pokljuka details	Johannes Thingnes Bø; Norway	31:43.2 (0+1+1+0)	Quentin Fillon Maillet; France	32:48.1 (0+0+0+1)	Tarjei Bø; Norway	32:49.8 (0+0+0+1)
Antholz-Anterselva details	Johannes Thingnes Bø; Norway	31:24.4 (0+0+1+1)	Sturla Holm Lægreid; Norway	32:04.6 (0+0+0+0)	Martin Ponsiluoma; Sweden	32:26.5 (1+1+0+0)
Nové Město details	Johannes Thingnes Bø; Norway	31:25.1 (0+0+1+1)	Tarjei Bø; Norway	31:59.7 (0+0+1+0)	Martin Ponsiluoma; Sweden	32:36.1 (0+3+1+1)
Oslo Holmenkollen details	Johannes Thingnes Bø; Norway	32:34.0 (0+0+1+0)	Quentin Fillon Maillet; France	33:06.7 (0+0+0+0)	Sturla Holm Lægreid; Norway	33:23.1 (0+0+0+1)

== Standings ==
Final standings after 7 competitions.

#	Name	KON	HOC	LGB	POK	ANT	NOV	OSL	Total
1.	Johannes Thingnes Bø (NOR)	90	90	60	90	90	90	90	600
2.	Sturla Holm Lægreid (NOR)	75	75	90	50	75	–	60	425
3.	Quentin Fillon Maillet (FRA)	31	50	36	75	28	DNS	75	295
4.	Tarjei Bø (NOR)	32	25	26	60	30	75	29	277
5.	Fabien Claude (FRA)	36	30	50	28	18	45	45	252
6.	Vetle Sjåstad Christiansen (NOR)	25	14	75	40	40	34	9	237
7.	Benedikt Doll (GER)	29	23	23	30	31	50	50	236
8.	Martin Ponsiluoma (SWE)	5	31	19	21	60	60	36	232
9.	Tommaso Giacomel (ITA)	11	40	32	45	29	27	30	214
10.	Roman Rees (GER)	45	5	28	26	50	32	21	207
11.	Niklas Hartweg (SUI)	24	45	DNS	31	36	29	40	205
12.	Sebastian Samuelsson (SWE)	50	32	40	22	23	36	–	203
13.	Johannes Dale (NOR)	0	34	25	34	45	21	26	185
14.	Michal Krčmář (CZE)	18	29	30	20	24	25	32	178
15.	Émilien Jacquelin (FRA)	60	60	11	–	27	–	–	158
16.	Antonin Guigonnat (FRA)	8	26	34	25	0	40	18	151
17.	Jakov Fak (SLO)	20	36	7	24	26	–	28	141
18.	Simon Eder (AUT)	15	7	–	27	32	22	34	137
19.	Jesper Nelin (SWE)	40	20	24	18	15	15	0	132
20.	Florent Claude (BEL)	27	22	29	19	1	31	–	129
21.	Filip Fjeld Andersen (NOR)	26	21	45	36	0	–	–	128
22.	Sebastian Stalder (SUI)	0	17	27	23	34	9	5	115
23.	Justus Strelow (GER)	28	15	16	0	25	24	DNS	108
24.	Tero Seppälä (FIN)	0	24	21	–	5	26	31	107
25.	David Zobel (GER)	34	0	3	–	21	23	14	95
26.	Johannes Kühn (GER)	12	4	9	29	16	20	0	90
27.	Olli Hiidensalo (FIN)	14	19	13	10	22	–	11	89
28.	Philipp Nawrath (GER)	19	0	–	–	7	30	27	83
29.	Vytautas Strolia (LTU)	30	DNF	20	11	10	–	7	78
30.	Andrejs Rastorgujevs (LAT)	–	6	–	6	20	18	23	73
#	Name	KON	HOC	LGB	POK	ANT	NOV	OSL	Total
31.	Felix Leitner (AUT)	13	28	15	9	–	–	–	65
32.	David Komatz (AUT)	22	0	0	–	0	11	25	58
33.	Anton Dudchenko (UKR)	23	18	10	–	2	3	2	58
34.	Sean Doherty (USA)	17	1	0	0	–	17	22	57
35.	Timofey Lapshin (KOR)	–	10	14	32	–	DNF	DNS	56
36.	Artem Pryma (UKR)	0	–	31	–	17	2	4	54
37.	Tuomas Harjula (FIN)	–	27	22	–	0	–	–	49
38.	Tomáš Mikyska (CZE)	9	12	5	–	–	4	17	47
39.	Endre Strømsheim (NOR)	–	–	–	–	–	28	15	43
40.	Alex Cisar (SLO)	16	3	–	7	0	16	–	42
41.	Vladimir Iliev (BUL)	–	16	–	–	0	13	12	41
42.	Christian Gow (CAN)	–	9	–	–	19	12	DNS	40
43.	Peppe Femling (SWE)	2	13	0	0	–	–	24	39
44.	Miha Dovžan (SLO)	–	–	8	15	9	–	–	32
45.	Anton Vidmar (SLO)	6	0	0	2	–	6	16	32
46.	Didier Bionaz (ITA)	0	0	–	17	12	–	–	29
47.	Jeremy Finello (SUI)	0	–	12	16	–	–	–	28
48.	Éric Perrot (FRA)	4	–	–	–	–	19	3	26
49.	Adam Runnalls (CAN)	DNS	0	0	–	13	–	10	23
50.	Bogdan Tsymbal (UKR)	7	–	6	0	–	10	0	23
51.	Campbell Wright (NZL)	0	–	–	14	8	–	–	22
52.	Jake Brown (USA)	21	–	–	0	–	–	0	21
53.	Paul Schommer (USA)	–	2	2	13	4	–	–	21
54.	Lucas Fratzscher (GER)	–	–	–	–	–	–	20	20
55.	Otto Invenius (FIN)	–	–	–	–	–	0	19	19
56.	Joscha Burkhalter (SUI)	–	–	18	–	–	1	–	19
57.	Serafin Wiestner (SUI)	–	–	0	12	0	7	0	19
58.	Émilien Claude (FRA)	0	0	17	–	–	–	–	17
59.	Jakub Štvrtecký (CZE)	–	11	0	DNS	–	0	6	17
60.	Rene Zakhna (EST)	0	0	0	–	0	14	–	14
#	Name	KON	HOC	LGB	POK	ANT	NOV	OSL	Total
61.	Dominic Unterweger (AUT)	–	–	–	–	14	–	–	14
62.	George Colțea (ROU)	0	–	–	–	–	–	13	13
63.	Grzegorz Guzik (POL)	–	–	0	–	11	–	–	11
64.	Mikito Tachizaki (JPN)	10	–	0	0	–	0	–	10
65.	Oscar Lombardot (FRA)	–	–	–	3	6	–	–	9
66.	Dmitrii Shamaev (ROU)	0	–	0	0	DNS	8	0	8
67.	Alexandr Mukhin (KAZ)	–	8	–	–	–	0	–	8
68.	Vebjørn Sørum (NOR)	–	–	–	–	–	–	8	8
68.	Malte Stefansson (SWE)	–	–	–	8	–	–	–	8
70.	Thierry Langer (BEL)	3	–	4	–	–	0	0	7
71.	Karol Dombrovski (LTU)	0	0	–	4	3	0	–	7
72.	Krešimir Crnković (CRO)	–	–	–	0	–	5	–	5
73.	Patrick Braunhofer (ITA)	–	–	–	5	–	–	–	5
74.	Emil Nykvist (SWE)	–	0	LAP	1	LAP	–	–	1
75.	Taras Lesiuk (UKR)	1	DNS	–	–	0	–	–	1
76.	Oskar Brandt (SWE)	–	–	1	–	–	–	0	1
77.	Einar Hedegart (NOR)	–	–	–	–	–	–	1	1
