= Biathlon World Championships 2024 – Men's individual =

Men's individual at the Biathlon World Championships 2024
- Venue: Vysočina Arena
- Location: Nové Město na Moravě, Czech Republic
- Dates: 14 February
- Competitors: 100 from 32 nations
- Winning time: 45:49.0

Medalists
gold medal	Johannes Thingnes Bø	Norway
silver medal	Tarjei Bø	Norway
bronze medal	Benedikt Doll	Germany

The Men's individual competition at the Biathlon World Championships 2024 was held on 14 February 2024.

Johannes Thingnes Bø was the defending champion and successfully defended his title. The victory gave Thingnes Bø his 19th gold medal in the world championships, including his second in the individual race. The silver medal was won by his brother, Tarjei Bø, while the bronze medal went to Benedikt Doll from Germany.

== Results ==
The race was started at 17:20.

Rank	Bib	Name	Nationality	Penalties (P+S+P+S)	Time	Deficit
1	9	Johannes Thingnes Bø	Norway	1 (1+0+0+0)	45:49.0	
2	24	Tarjei Bø	Norway	1 (0+1+0+0)	46:47.9	+58.9
3	12	Benedikt Doll	Germany	1 (0+0+0+1)	47:42.3	+1:53.3
4	3	Andrejs Rastorgujevs	Latvia	2 (0+1+0+1)	48:39.2	+2:50.2
5	27	Émilien Jacquelin	France	1 (1+0+0+0)	48:52.2	+3:03.2
6	1	Quentin Fillon Maillet	France	3 (2+1+0+0)	49:05.2	+3:16.2
7	6	Sebastian Samuelsson	Sweden	3 (1+1+0+1)	49:17.7	+3:28.7
8	36	Éric Perrot	France	3 (2+1+0+0)	49:21.1	+3:32.1
9	26	Jakov Fak	Slovenia	1 (0+1+0+0)	49:24.6	+3:35.6
10	47	Tomáš Mikyska	Czech Republic	1 (0+0+0+1)	50:03.9	+4:14.9
11	8	Niklas Hartweg	Switzerland	1 (0+0+0+1)	50:22.3	+4:33.3
12	4	Simon Eder	Austria	2 (0+1+1+0)	50:35.4	+4:46.4
13	10	Roman Rees	Germany	2 (1+1+0+0)	50:40.3	+4:51.3
14	55	Kristo Siimer	Estonia	1 (0+0+0+1)	50:40.7	+4:51.7
15	2	Vytautas Strolia	Lithuania	1 (0+0+1+0)	50:43.3	+4:54.3
16	41	Vetle Sjåstad Christiansen	Norway	1 (0+0+1+0)	50:46.5	+4:57.5
17	45	Miha Dovžan	Slovenia	1 (0+0+0+1)	50:49.4	+5:00.4
18	54	Sturla Holm Lægreid	Norway	2 (0+0+0+2)	50:53.4	+5:04.4
19	22	Johannes Kühn	Germany	4 (0+1+1+2)	50:57.6	+5:08.6
20	20	Campbell Wright	United States	3 (1+1+0+1)	50:58.1	+5:09.1
21	32	Endre Strømsheim	Norway	1 (0+1+0+0)	50:58.9	+5:09.9
22	31	Dmitrii Shamaev	Romania	1 (0+1+0+0)	51:06.2	+5:17.2
23	42	Sean Doherty	United States	2 (0+1+0+1)	51:13.5	+5:24.5
24	5	Lukas Hofer	Italy	4 (1+0+0+3)	51:19.9	+5:30.9
25	21	Timofey Lapshin	South Korea	2 (0+1+0+1)	51:21.4	+5:32.4
26	13	Michal Krčmář	Czech Republic	3 (1+0+1+1)	51:36.6	+5:47.6
27	23	George Colțea	Romania	2 (0+1+0+1)	51:39.2	+5:50.2
28	14	Sebastian Stalder	Switzerland	2 (0+1+0+1)	51:44.7	+5:55.7
29	18	Anton Dudchenko	Ukraine	2 (2+0+0+0)	51:49.4	+6:00.4
30	29	Johannes Dale-Skjevdal	Norway	5 (0+0+1+4)	51:53.6	+6:04.6
31	15	Adam Runnalls	Canada	3 (0+0+1+2)	51:59.2	+6:10.2
32	86	Lovro Planko	Slovenia	1 (0+0+0+1)	52:00.6	+6:11.6
33	11	Jesper Nelin	Sweden	5 (0+3+1+1)	52:09.3	+6:20.3
34	71	David Komatz	Austria	1 (1+0+0+0)	52:12.0	+6:23.0
35	40	Alexandr Starodubets	South Korea	0 (0+0+0+0)	52:19.3	+6:30.3
36	89	Tero Seppälä	Finland	3 (1+0+1+1)	52:26.8	+6:37.8
37	7	Florent Claude	Belgium	4 (0+1+1+2)	52:30.7	+6:41.7
38	28	Pavel Magazeev	Moldova	3 (0+1+1+1)	52:38.0	+6:49.0
39	19	Martin Ponsiluoma	Sweden	6 (1+2+2+1)	52:44.2	+6:55.2
40	25	Rene Zahkna	Estonia	4 (2+1+0+1)	52:45.6	+6:56.6
41	77	Fabien Claude	France	4 (0+1+1+2)	52:51.8	+7:02.8
42	44	Konrad Badacz	Poland	3 (0+1+1+1)	52:51.9	+7:02.9
43	48	Philipp Horn	Germany	5 (0+2+1+2)	52:57.9	+7:08.9
44	46	Christian Gow	Canada	1 (0+1+0+0)	52:58.2	+7:09.2
45	16	Tommaso Giacomel	Italy	6 (0+3+2+1)	53:06.4	+7:17.4
46	75	Vítězslav Hornig	Czech Republic	1 (0+0+0+1)	53:06.5	+7:17.5
47	50	Vladislav Kireyev	Kazakhstan	3 (0+0+2+1)	53:13.9	+7:24.9
48	30	Otto Invenius	Finland	5 (1+0+1+3)	53:19.4	+7:30.4
49	63	Didier Bionaz	Italy	4 (2+0+0+2)	53:28.9	+7:39.9
50	88	Jake Brown	United States	4 (2+1+0+1)	53:33.6	+7:44.6
51	66	Andrzej Nędza-Kubiniec	Poland	2 (0+0+1+1)	53:51.2	+8:02.2
52	59	Jaakko Ranta	Finland	2 (1+0+1+0)	53:53.0	+8:04.0
53	81	Elia Zeni	Italy	2 (1+1+0+0)	53:53.8	+8:04.8
54	52	Vladimir Iliev	Bulgaria	3 (2+1+0+0)	53:55.2	+8:06.2
55	38	Joscha Burkhalter	Switzerland	4 (1+0+2+1)	53:55.8	+8:06.8
56	60	Mikito Tachizaki	Japan	2 (0+0+0+2)	53:59.5	+8:10.5
57	34	Felix Leitner	Austria	2 (1+0+0+1)	53:59.8	+8:10.8
58	80	Blagoy Todev	Bulgaria	2 (0+1+0+1)	54:02.8	+8:13.8
59	83	Olli Hiidensalo	Finland	2 (1+0+0+1)	54:06.4	+8:17.4
60	93	Anton Vidmar	Slovenia	3 (1+2+0+0)	54:13.4	+8:24.4
61	96	Jan Guńka	Poland	3 (1+1+0+1)	54:18.3	+8:29.3
62	43	Artem Pryma	Ukraine	4 (0+2+0+2)	54:23.2	+8:34.2
63	98	Jakub Štvrtecký	Czech Republic	4 (0+0+1+3)	54:26.3	+8:37.3
64	49	Peppe Femling	Sweden	4 (2+0+0+2)	54:48.5	+8:59.5
65	73	Maksim Fomin	Lithuania	2 (2+0+0+0)	54:49.3	+9:00.3
66	62	Tomáš Sklenárik	Slovakia	4 (0+0+2+2)	54:56.8	+9:07.8
67	65	George Buta	Romania	4 (1+0+1+2)	55:05.1	+9:16.1
68	57	Renārs Birkentāls	Latvia	3 (0+1+1+1)	55:05.5	+9:16.5
69	82	Mihail Usov	Moldova	2 (1+1+0+0)	55:14.0	+9:25.0
70	56	Tomas Kaukėnas	Lithuania	4 (0+1+1+2)	55:18.8	+9:29.8
71	39	Krešimir Crnković	Croatia	5 (2+1+2+0)	55:37.8	+9:48.8
72	84	Nikita Akimov	Kazakhstan	2 (0+1+0+1)	55:41.5	+9:52.5
73	100	Taras Lesiuk	Ukraine	4 (1+2+0+1)	55:52.6	+10:03.6
74	92	Raul Flore	Romania	3 (1+1+0+1)	55:56.6	+10:07.6
75	90	Vincent Bonacci	United States	4 (0+3+0+1)	56:21.8	+10:32.8
76	69	Denys Nasyko	Ukraine	4 (2+1+1+0)	56:24.0	+10:35.0
77	97	Anton Sinapov	Bulgaria	3 (1+1+1+0)	56:25.0	+10:36.0
78	67	Raido Ränkel	Estonia	7 (1+2+0+4)	56:25.8	+10:36.8
79	61	Maksim Makarov	Moldova	5 (2+0+1+2)	56:30.6	+10:41.6
80	79	Jeremy Finello	Switzerland	8 (3+3+0+2)	56:33.6	+10:44.6
81	17	Alexandr Mukhin	Kazakhstan	7 (4+1+1+1)	56:34.0	+10:45.0
82	53	Marcus Webb	Great Britain	1 (0+1+0+0)	56:39.4	+10:50.4
83	70	Logan Pletz	Canada	4 (1+1+1+1)	56:56.4	+11:07.4
84	51	Marek Mackels	Belgium	5 (0+1+0+4)	56:58.5	+11:09.5
85	33	Apostolos Angelis	Greece	4 (1+1+1+1)	57:28.0	+11:39.0
86	68	Aleksandrs Patrijuks	Latvia	6 (2+4+0+0)	57:55.4	+12:06.4
87	99	Matej Badan	Slovakia	3 (1+1+0+1)	57:56.7	+12:07.7
88	78	Damián Cesnek	Slovakia	5 (1+2+0+2)	58:23.8	+12:34.8
89	73	Cesar Beauvais	Belgium	5 (2+1+1+1)	59:06.4	+13:17.4
90	64	Nikolaos Tsourekas	Greece	4 (0+2+0+2)	59:38.5	+13:49.5
91	91	Magnus Oberhauser	Austria	6 (2+2+1+1)	59:44.0	+13:55.0
92	95	Jokūbas Mackinė	Lithuania	5 (0+2+0+3)	59:52.4	+14:03.4
93	37	Jacob Weel Rosbo	Denmark	7 (1+2+1+3)	1:00:17.1	+14:28.1
94	35	Roberto Piqueras	Spain	7 (1+2+2+2)	1:00:19.1	+14:30.1
95	72	Choi Du-jin	South Korea	5 (2+0+1+2)	1:00:24.8	+14:35.8
96	76	Kiyomasa Ojima	Japan	8 (2+2+2+2)	1:00:53.6	+15:04.6
97	101	Haldan Borglum	Canada	5 (2+1+0+2)	1:01:14.7	+15:25.7
98	94	Masaharu Yamamoto	Japan	9 (2+1+3+3)	1:02:30.6	+16:41.6
99	85	Enkhsaikhan Enkhbat	Mongolia	7 (2+2+1+2)	1:02:37.5	+16:48.5
100	58	Noah Bradford	Australia	6 (1+3+0+2)	1:03:12.0	+17:23.0
—	87	Rasmus Schiellerup	Denmark	Did not start		
