= 2022–23 Biathlon World Cup – Pursuit Women =

2022–23 Biathlon World Cup Women's Pursuit standings

The 2022–23 Biathlon World Cup – Pursuit Women started on 4 December 2022 in Kontiolahti and will conclude on 18 March 2023 in Oslo Holmenkollen.

== Competition format ==
The 12.5 kilometres (7.8 mi) pursuit race is skied over five laps. The biathlete shoots four times at any shooting lane, in the order of prone, prone, standing, standing, totalling 20 targets. For each missed target a biathlete has to run a 150 metres (490 ft) penalty loop. Competitors' starts are staggered, according to the result of the previous sprint race.

== 2022–23 Top 3 standings ==
Medal	Athlete	Points
Gold:	(Sweden) Elvira Öberg	350
Silver:	(France) Julia Simon	323
Bronze:	(Italy) Dorothea Wierer	259

== Events summary ==
Event	Gold	Time	Silver	Time	Bronze	Time
Kontiolahti details	Julia Simon; France	31:13.0 (0+0+0+0)	Dorothea Wierer; Italy	31:24.9 (0+0+0+0)	Elvira Öberg; Sweden	31:34.7 (0+1+0+0)
Hochfilzen details	Julia Simon; France	29:56.7 (0+0+1+0)	Ingrid Landmark Tandrevold; Norway	30:16.3 (0+0+1+0)	Markéta Davidová; Czech Republic	30:24.8 (0+0+2+0)
Annecy-Le Grand-Bornand details	Elvira Öberg; Sweden	29:42.4 (0+0+0+0)	Lisa Vittozzi; Italy	30:02.8 (0+2+0+0)	Julia Simon; France	30:29.3 (0+0+1+2)
Pokljuka details	Elvira Öberg; Sweden	29:41.6 (0+0+0+0)	Dorothea Wierer; Italy	29:59.2 (0+0+1+0)	Julia Simon; France	30:04.0 (0+1+1+0)
Antholz-Anterselva details	Denise Herrmann-Wick; Germany	29:53.1 (0+1+0+1)	Lisa Vittozzi; Italy	30:04.1 (0+0+0+0)	Elvira Öberg; Sweden	30:10.3 (0+1+0+1)
Nové Město						
Oslo Holmenkollen						

== Standings ==
Intermediate standings after 5 competitions.

#	Name	KON	HOC	LGB	POK	ANT	NOV	OSL	Total
1.	Elvira Öberg (SWE)	60	50	90	90	60			350
2.	Julia Simon (FRA)	90	90	60	60	23			323
3.	Dorothea Wierer (ITA)	75	28	45	75	36			259
4.	Lisa Vittozzi (ITA)	50	34	75	–	75			234
5.	Denise Herrmann-Wick (GER)	25	45	36	36	90			232
6.	Markéta Davidová (CZE)	36	60	15	45	40			196
7.	Ingrid Landmark Tandrevold (NOR)	27	75	50	32	3			187
8.	Linn Persson (SWE)	30	40	40	40	25			175
9.	Lisa Theresa Hauser (AUT)	32	32	19	31	30			144
10.	Anaïs Chevalier-Bouchet (FRA)	29	29	32	26	28			144
11.	Hanna Öberg (SWE)	31	36	16	–	50			133
12.	Paulína Fialková (SVK)	11	31	0	50	24			116
13.	Vanessa Voigt (GER)	34	27	24	15	16			116
14.	Lou Jeanmonnot (FRA)	16	25	12	28	34			115
15.	Caroline Colombo (FRA)	40	19	18	18	18			113
16.	Sophie Chauveau (FRA)	22	–	34	30	17			103
17.	Lena Häcki-Groß (SUI)	19	13	14	22	32			100
18.	Mari Eder (FIN)	17	10	26	25	10			88
19.	Chloé Chevalier (FRA)	3	21	23	12	26			85
20.	Aita Gasparin (SUI)	7	20	29	27	DNS			83
21.	Anna Magnusson (SWE)	4	23	28	0	27			82
22.	Marte Olsbu Røiseland (NOR)	–	–	–	34	45			79
23.	Karoline Offigstad Knotten (NOR)	14	30	1	5	22			72
24.	Sophia Schneider (GER)	18	17	17	–	20			72
25.	Suvi Minkkinen (FIN)	26	22	11	11	0			70
26.	Elisa Gasparin (SUI)	13	0	22	24	0			59
27.	Franziska Preuß (GER)	–	15	31	–	7			53
28.	Samuela Comola (ITA)	21	16	13	2	1			53
29.	Dunja Zdouc (AUT)	8	0	6	23	14			51
30.	Amy Baserga (SUI)	–	–	21	29	–			50
#	Name	KON	HOC	LGB	POK	ANT	NOV	OSL	Total
31.	Anna Weidel (GER)	24	26	0	DNS	–			50
32.	Jessica Jislová (CZE)	–	12	27	9	DNS			48
33.	Emma Lunder (CAN)	45	–	–	–	2			47
34.	Anna Gandler (AUT)	–	11	30	4	LAP			45
35.	Ragnhild Femsteinevik (NOR)	0	0	25	16	0			41
36.	Lotte Lie (BEL)	12	7	20	0	–			39
37.	Nadia Moser (CAN)	–	18	9	–	11			38
38.	Janina Hettich-Walz (GER)	–	–	0	8	29			37
39.	Ida Lien (NOR)	28	9	0	DNS	–			37
40.	Rebecca Passler (ITA)	20	4	–	–	13			37
41.	Baiba Bendika (LAT)	10	0	4	21	–			35
42.	Kamila Żuk (POL)	–	0	8	19	6			33
43.	Polona Klemenčič (SLO)	1	24	7	–	–			32
44.	Hanna Kebinger (SWE)	–	–	–	–	31			31
45.	Milena Todorova (BUL)	0	14	0	–	15			29
46.	Emilie Ågheim Kalkenberg (NOR)	23	0	0	0	–			23
47.	Tilda Johansson (SWE)	–	–	–	–	21			21
48.	Tereza Voborníková (CZE)	0	–	–	20	0			20
49.	Mona Brorsson (SWE)	–	–	–	1	19			20
50.	Tamara Steiner (AUT)	–	–	10	10	–			20
51.	Yuliia Dzhima (UKR)	–	–	–	6	12			18
52.	Lea Meier (SUI)	0	–	0	17	–			17
53.	Joanna Jakiela (POL)	15	–	LAP	0	–			15
54.	Federica Sanfilippo (ITA)	–	–	–	14	–			14
55.	Stina Nilsson (SWE)	6	8	0	–	–			14
56.	Deedra Irwin (USA)	0	0	–	13	0			13
57.	Alina Stremous (MDA)	0	0	0	7	4			11
58.	Anastasiya Merkushyna (UKR)	–	6	5	0	DNS			11
59.	Anna Mąka (POL)	9	–	–	–	–			9
60.	Anna Juppe (AUT)	–	–	–	–	9			9
#	Name	KON	HOC	LGB	POK	ANT	NOV	OSL	Total
61.	Hannah Auchentaller (ITA)	–	–	0	–	8			8
62.	Julia Schwaiger (AUT)	5	2	0	–	–			7
63.	Olena Bilosiuk (UKR)	–	DNS	0	–	5			5
64.	Juliane Frühwirt (GER)	0	5	–	–	–			5
65.	Fuyuko Tachizaki (JPN)	2	0	3	0	0			5
66.	Tuuli Tomingas (EST)	–	3	2	DNS	–			5
67.	Ekaterina Avvakumova (KOR)	–	0	0	3	LAP			3
68.	Susan Külm (EST)	0	1	0	–	0			1
