= 2022–23 Biathlon World Cup – Sprint Women =

2022–23 Biathlon World Cup Women's Sprint standings

The 2022–23 Biathlon World Cup – Sprint Women started on 3 December 2022 in Kontiolahti and will conclude on 17 March 2023 in Oslo Holmenkollen.

== Competition format ==
The 10 kilometres (6.2 mi) sprint race is the third oldest biathlon event; the distance is skied over three laps. The biathlete shoots two times at any shooting lane, first prone, then standing, totalling 10 targets. For each missed target the biathlete has to complete a penalty lap of around 150 metres (490 ft). Competitors' starts are staggered, normally by 30 seconds.

== 2022–23 Top 3 standings ==
| Medal | Athlete | Points |
|---|---|---|
| Gold: | (Germany) Denise Herrmann-Wick | 270 |
| Silver: | (Sweden) Elvira Öberg | 263 |
| Bronze: | (Italy) Dorothea Wierer | 246 |

== Events summary ==
| Event | Gold | Time | Silver | Time | Bronze | Time |
|---|---|---|---|---|---|---|
| Kontiolahti details | Lisa Theresa Hauser; Austria | 20:39.5 (0+0) | Lisa Vittozzi; Italy | 20:56.8 (1+0) | Linn Persson; Sweden | 21:03.7 (0+0) |
| Hochfilzen details | Denise Herrmann-Wick; Germany | 20:07.1 (0+0) | Markéta Davidová; Czech Republic | 20:25.2 (0+1) | Julia Simon; France | 20:27.2 (0+1) |
| Annecy-Le Grand-Bornand details | Anna Magnusson; Sweden | 21:04.1 (0+0) | Linn Persson; Sweden | 21:17.5 (0+1) | Denise Herrmann-Wick; Germany | 21:19.9 (1+0) |
| Pokljuka details | Elvira Öberg; Sweden | 20:25.2 (0+0) | Julia Simon; France | 20:32.1 (0+0) | Dorothea Wierer; Italy | 20:43.9 (0+0) |
| Antholz-Anterselva | Dorothea Wierer; Italy | 20:59.6 (0+0) | Chloé Chevalier; France | 21:02.4 (0+0) | Elvira Öberg; Sweden | 21:08.3 (0+0) |
| Nové Město | | | | | | |
| Oslo Holmenkollen | | | | | | |

== Standings ==
Intermediate standings after 5 competitions.

| # | Name | KON | HOC | LGB | POK | ANT | NOV | OSL | Total |
|---|---|---|---|---|---|---|---|---|---|
| 1. | Denise Herrmann-Wick (GER) | 40 | 90 | 60 | 40 | 40 | | | 270 |
| 2. | Elvira Öberg (SWE) | 29 | 50 | 34 | 90 | 60 | | | 263 |
| 3. | Dorothea Wierer (ITA) | 32 | 36 | 28 | 60 | 90 | | | 246 |
| 4. | Linn Persson (SWE) | 60 | 31 | 75 | 36 | 19 | | | 221 |
| 5. | Julia Simon (FRA) | 25 | 60 | 26 | 75 | 32 | | | 218 |
| 6. | Lisa Theresa Hauser (AUT) | 90 | 29 | 19 | 28 | 29 | | | 195 |
| 7. | Markéta Davidová (CZE) | 19 | 75 | 25 | 45 | 25 | | | 189 |
| 8. | Lisa Vittozzi (ITA) | 75 | 23 | 40 | 0 | 28 | | | 166 |
| 9. | Mari Eder (FIN) | 22 | 21 | 45 | 31 | 24 | | | 143 |
| 10. | Anna Magnusson (SWE) | 8 | 32 | 90 | 0 | 10 | | | 140 |
| 11. | Paulína Fialková (SVK) | 15 | 12 | 36 | 50 | 27 | | | 140 |
| 12. | Chloé Chevalier (FRA) | 3 | 30 | 21 | 5 | 75 | | | 134 |
| 13. | Ingrid Landmark Tandrevold (NOR) | 40 | 28 | 23 | 32 | 0 | | | 123 |
| 14. | Hanna Öberg (SWE) | 23 | 40 | 19 | – | 30 | | | 112 |
| 15. | Anaïs Chevalier-Bouchet (FRA) | 16 | 25 | 31 | 12 | 26 | | | 110 |
| 16. | Sophie Chauveau (FRA) | 7 | 0 | 50 | 34 | 13 | | | 104 |
| 17. | Lou Jeanmonnot (FRA) | 0 | 10 | 32 | 31 | 31 | | | 104 |
| 18. | Lena Häcki-Groß (SUI) | 22 | 0 | 30 | 24 | 17 | | | 93 |
| 19. | Anamarija Lampič (SLO) | – | 45 | – | 0 | 45 | | | 90 |
| 20. | Elisa Gasparin (SUI) | 18 | 24 | 22 | 23 | 0 | | | 87 |
| 21. | Sophia Schneider (GER) | 34 | 18 | 13 | 0 | 20 | | | 85 |
| 22. | Aita Gasparin (SUI) | 27 | 27 | 0 | 29 | 0 | | | 83 |
| 23. | Anna Weidel (GER) | 45 | 19 | 3 | 15 | – | | | 82 |
| 24. | Vanessa Voigt (GER) | 30 | 11 | 11 | 18 | 12 | | | 82 |
| 25. | Ida Lien (NOR) | 31 | 2 | 27 | 20 | 0 | | | 80 |
| 26. | Marte Olsbu Røiseland (NOR) | – | – | – | 25 | 50 | | | 75 |
| 27. | Karoline Offigstad Knotten (NOR) | 9 | 34 | 24 | 0 | 0 | | | 67 |
| 28. | Emma Lunder (CAN) | 50 | 0 | 0 | – | 7 | | | 57 |
| 29. | Caroline Colombo (FRA) | 17 | 0 | 6 | 0 | 34 | | | 57 |
| 30. | Baiba Bendika (LAT) | 13 | 20 | 16 | 4 | – | | | 53 |
| # | Name | KON | HOC | LGB | POK | ANT | NOV | OSL | Total |
| 31. | Dunja Zdouc (AUT) | 0 | 7 | 14 | 17 | 15 | | | 53 |
| 32. | Kamila Żuk (POL) | 0 | 0 | 0 | 26 | 23 | | | 49 |
| 33. | Suvi Minkkinen (FIN) | 14 | 3 | 10 | 16 | 5 | | | 48 |
| 34. | Lotte Lie (BEL) | 13 | 26 | 7 | 0 | – | | | 46 |
| 35. | Yuliia Dzhima (UKR) | – | – | 0 | 22 | 21 | | | 43 |
| 36. | Ragnhild Femsteinevik (NOR) | 13 | 0 | 8 | 21 | 0 | | | 42 |
| 37. | Emilie Ågheim Kalkenberg (NOR) | 26 | 13 | 1 | 0 | – | | | 40 |
| 38. | Anna Gandler (AUT) | – | 0 | 21 | 15 | 2 | | | 38 |
| 39. | Milena Todorova (BUL) | 0 | 4 | 29 | 0 | 4 | | | 37 |
| 40. | Janina Hettich-Walz (GER) | – | – | 0 | 0 | 36 | | | 36 |
| 41. | Franziska Preuß (GER) | – | 16 | 17 | – | 3 | | | 36 |
| 42. | Rebecca Passler (ITA) | 24 | 8 | 0 | 0 | 0 | | | 32 |
| 43. | Samuela Comola (ITA) | 0 | 14 | 0 | 2 | 16 | | | 32 |
| 44. | Amy Baserga (SUI) | DNS | – | 2 | 27 | DNS | | | 29 |
| 45. | Polona Klemenčič (SLO) | 20 | 0 | 9 | 0 | – | | | 29 |
| 46. | Johanna Skottheim (SWE) | 28 | 0 | 0 | 0 | – | | | 28 |
| 47. | Tuuli Tomingas (EST) | 0 | 22 | 4 | 0 | 0 | | | 26 |
| 48. | Joanne Reid (USA) | 10 | 15 | 0 | 0 | 0 | | | 25 |
| 49. | Deedra Irwin (USA) | 5 | 0 | 0 | 19 | 0 | | | 24 |
| 50. | Nadia Moser (CAN) | 0 | 9 | 0 | – | 14 | | | 23 |
| 51. | Hanna Kebinger (SWE) | – | – | – | – | 22 | | | 22 |
| 52. | Karoline Erdal (NOR) | 0 | 17 | 5 | – | – | | | 22 |
| 53. | Jessica Jislová (CZE) | 0 | 0 | 15 | 7 | 0 | | | 22 |
| 54. | Olena Bilosiuk (UKR) | 0 | 0 | 12 | DNS | 9 | | | 21 |
| 55. | Alina Stremous (MDA) | 0 | 0 | 0 | 10 | 11 | | | 21 |
| 56. | Anna Juppe (AUT) | 0 | 0 | – | – | 18 | | | 18 |
| 57. | Mona Brorsson (SWE) | – | – | – | 8 | 6 | | | 14 |
| 58. | Tamara Steiner (AUT) | – | – | 0 | 13 | DNS | | | 13 |
| 59. | Tereza Voborníková (CZE) | 0 | 0 | – | 11 | 0 | | | 11 |
| 60. | Lea Meier (SUI) | 0 | 0 | 0 | 9 | – | | | 9 |
| # | Name | KON | HOC | LGB | POK | ANT | NOV | OSL | Total |
| 61. | Anastasiya Merkushyna (UKR) | – | 6 | 0 | 3 | 0 | | | 9 |
| 62. | Tilda Johansson (SWE) | – | – | – | – | 8 | | | 8 |
| 63. | Nastassia Kinnunen (FIN) | 0 | 0 | 0 | 6 | 0 | | | 6 |
| 64. | Joanna Jakiela (POL) | 6 | 0 | 0 | 0 | 0 | | | 6 |
| 65. | Stina Nilsson (SWE) | 0 | 6 | 0 | 0 | – | | | 6 |
| 66. | Anna Mąka (POL) | 4 | 0 | 0 | 0 | – | | | 4 |
| 67. | Susan Külm (EST) | 2 | 0 | 0 | 0 | 1 | | | 3 |
| 68. | Ekaterina Avvakumova (KOR) | – | 0 | 0 | 1 | 0 | | | 1 |
| 69. | Juliane Frühwirt (GER) | 0 | 1 | – | – | – | | | 1 |
| 70. | Venla Lehtonen (FIN) | 1 | 0 | 0 | 0 | – | | | 1 |
