= 2022–23 Biathlon World Cup – Nations Cup Women =

The 2022–23 Biathlon World Cup – Nations Cup Women started on 30 November 2022 in Kontiolahti and will conclude on 17 March 2023 in Oslo Holmenkollen.

== 2022–23 Top 3 standings ==
Medal	Athlete	Points
Gold:	France	4690
Silver:	Sweden	4647
Bronze:	Germany	4456

== Standings ==
Point system

Place	IN	SP	RL	SR	MR
1	160		420		
2	154		390		
3	148		360		
4	143		330		
5	140		310		
6	138		290		
7	136		270		
8	134		250		
9	132		230		
10	131		220		
11	130		210		
12	129		200		
13	128		190		
14	127		180		
15	126		170		
16	125		160		
17	124		150		
18	123		140		
19	122		130		
20	121		120		
21	120		110		
22	119		100		
23	118		90		
24	117		80		
25	116		70		
26	115		60		
27	114		50		
28	113		40		
29	112		30		
30	111		20		
31	110		—		
32	109		—		
33	108		—		
34	107		—		
35	106		—		
36	105		—		
37	104		—		
38	103		—		
39	102		—		
40	101		—		

Place	IN	SP	RL	SR	MR
41	100		—		
42	99		—		
43	98		—		
44	97		—		
45	96		—		
46	95		—		
47	94		—		
48	93		—		
49	92		—		
50	91		—		
51	90		—		
52	89		—		
53	88		—		
54	87		—		
55	86		—		
56	85		—		
57	84		—		
58	83		—		
59	82		—		
60	81		—		
61	80		—		
62	79		—		
63	78		—		
64	77		—		
65	76		—		
66	75		—		
67	74		—		
68	73		—		
69	72		—		
70	71		—		
71	70		—		
72	69		—		
73	68		—		
74	67		—		
75	66		—		
76	65		—		
77	64		—		
78	63		—		
79	62		—		
80	61		—		

Place	IN	SP	RL	SR	MR
81	59		—		
82	57		—		
83	55		—		
84	53		—		
85	51		—		
86	49		—		
87	47		—		
88	45		—		
89	43		—		
90	41		—		
91	39		—		
92	37		—		
93	35		—		
94	33		—		
95	31		—		
96	29		—		
97	27		—		
98	25		—		
99	23		—		
100	21		—		
101	19		—		
102	17		—		
103	15		—		
104	13		—		
105	11		—		
106	9		—		
107	7		—		
108	5		—		
109	3		—		
110	1		—		

Each nation's score comprises the points earned by its three best placed athletes in every Sprint and Individual competition, the points earned in the Men's Relay competitions, and half of the points earned in the (Single) Mixed Relay competitions.

Intermediate standings after 13 competitions.

#	Name	KON IN	KON RL	KON SP	HOC SP	HOC RL	LGB SP	POK SP	POK SR	POK MR	RUH IN	RUH RL	ANT SP	ANT RL	OBE MR	OBE SP	OBE IN	OBE SR	OBE RL	NOV SP	NOV MR	NOV SR	OST IN	OST RL	OSL SP	Total
1.	France	392	330	358	403	420	406	419	195	210	427	290	420	420												4690
2.	Sweden	420	420	405	413	390	448	404	110	180	400	270	397	390												4647
3.	Germany	411	390	412	397	330	378	371	95	155	371	390	396	360												4456
4.	Norway	368	360	395	379	310	374	378	210	145	398	420	336	290												4363
5.	Italy	349	230	410	373	360	363	344	105	195	417	360	404	330												4240
6.	Switzerland	352	310	367	348	290	354	380	180	165	322	330	309	270												3977
7.	Austria	308	250	352	326	230	354	360	155	115	367	230	362	310												3719
8.	Czech Republic	357	290	291	322	270	314	358	85	135	351	310	293	220												3596
9.	Finland	351	270	337	318	190	323	353	165	85	266	220	320	210												3408
10.	Ukraine	218	170	248	275	200	283	320	135	105	331	210	327	230												3052
11.	United States	294	210	310	255	170	220	291	145	95	246	190	245	190												2861
12.	Poland	257	200	288	249	160	289	290	100	125	246	160	272	170												2806
13.	Estonia	242	220	239	264	220	265	236	70	75	310	250	236	130												2757
14.	Slovakia	281	190	279	278	210	275	207	65	90	265	180	250	180												2750
15.	Canada	284	180	268	257	180	216	–	45	55	273	200	296	250												2504
16.	Slovenia	206	–	190	330	250	109	213	90	100	238	150	282	200												2358
17.	Bulgaria	206	160	212	206	140	203	196	50	80	272	170	253	140												2288
18.	Romania	113	–	170	173	150	222	204	80	50	222	130	187	160												1861
19.	Japan	205	–	188	208	–	191	230	125	–	217	140	170	–												1674
20.	Latvia	214	–	281	120	–	149	192	–	45	121	–	145	150												1417
21.	Moldova	89	–	120	140	–	138	147	115	70	129	–	174	–												1122
22.	Lithuania	145	–	100	100	–	133	90	55	60	147	–	175	–												1005
23.	Kazakhstan	106	–	100	97	130	123	109	60	40	116	–	88	–												969
24.	South Korea	–	–	–	132	–	146	175	75	65	148	–	171	–												912
25.	Belgium	131	–	113	126	–	107	186	–	110	–	–	–	–												773
26.	Croatia	–	–	–	57	–	49	49	40	–	51	–	–	–												246
27.	Greenland	–	–	–	–	–	–	84	–	–	120	–	–	–												204
28.	Australia	–	–	–	–	–	–	59	–	–	47	–	35	–												141
