= Biathlon World Championships 2025 – Men's relay =

Men's relay at the Biathlon World Championships 2025
- Venue: Roland Arena
- Location: Lenzerheide, Switzerland
- Dates: 22 February
- Competitors: 92 from 23 nations
- Teams: 23
- Winning time: 1:18:18.1

Medalists
gold medal	Endre Strømsheim; Tarjei Bø; Sturla Holm Lægreid; Johannes Thingnes Bø	Norway
silver medal	Émilien Claude; Fabien Claude; Éric Perrot; Quentin Fillon Maillet	France
bronze medal	Philipp Nawrath; Danilo Riethmüller; Johannes Kühn; Philipp Horn	Germany

The Men's relay competition at the Biathlon World Championships 2025 was held on 22 February 2025.

== Results ==
The race was started at 15:05.

Rank	Bib	Team	Time	Penalties (P+S)	Deficit
1st place, gold medalist(s)	2	Norway Endre Strømsheim; Tarjei Bø; Sturla Holm Lægreid; Johannes Thingnes Bø	1:18:18.1; 19:28.4; 19:38.4; 19:14.8; 19:56.5	0+2 0+2; 0+2 0+0; 0+0 0+2; 0+0 0+0; 0+0 0+0	
2nd place, silver medalist(s)	1	France Émilien Claude; Fabien Claude; Éric Perrot; Quentin Fillon Maillet	1:19:00.0; 19:40.5; 19:52.2; 19:35.4; 19:51.9	0+3 0+4; 0+0 0+1; 0+1 0+2; 0+1 0+0; 0+1 0+1	+41.9
3rd place, bronze medalist(s)	4	Germany Philipp Nawrath; Danilo Riethmüller; Johannes Kühn; Philipp Horn	1:19:54.0; 19:53.9; 20:04.7; 20:05.6; 19:49.8	0+5 0+5; 0+1 0+3; 0+1 0+2; 0+0 0+0; 0+3 0+0	+1:35.9
4	3	Sweden Viktor Brandt; Jesper Nelin; Martin Ponsiluoma; Sebastian Samuelsson	1:20:12.1; 20:11.9; 20:29.2; 19:35.9; 19:55.1	0+2 1+9; 0+1 0+3; 0+0 1+3; 0+0 0+2; 0+1 0+1	+1:54.0
5	7	Italy Daniele Cappellari; Lukas Hofer; Elia Zeni; Tommaso Giacomel	1:20:30.8; 20:10.2; 19:58.9; 20:55.2; 19:26.5	0+6 0+3; 0+0 0+0; 0+3 0+0; 0+2 0+2; 0+1 0+1	+2:12.7
6	9	Czech Republic Tomáš Mikyska; Vítězslav Hornig; Jonáš Mareček; Michal Krčmář	1:20:42.9; 20:04.6; 19:50.7; 20:31.3; 20:16.3	0+3 0+6; 0+1 0+2; 0+0 0+2; 0+2 0+0; 0+0 0+2	+2:24.8
7	11	Switzerland Sebastian Stalder; Joscha Burkhalter; James Pacal; Niklas Hartweg	1:21:01.3; 19:52.2; 20:20.0; 21:06.2; 19:42.9	0+5 0+4; 0+1 0+1; 0+2 0+1; 0+1 0+2; 0+1 0+0	+2:43.2
8	6	Ukraine Anton Dudchenko; Vitalii Mandzyn; Taras Lesiuk; Dmytro Pidruchnyi	1:21:07.8; 19:51.8; 20:17.4; 20:43.3; 20:15.3	0+3 0+5; 0+0 0+1; 0+0 0+3; 0+2 0+0; 0+1 0+1	+2:49.7
9	8	United States Paul Schommer; Maxime Germain; Campbell Wright; Sean Doherty	1:21:33.3; 20:20.8; 20:11.0; 19:48.7; 21:12.8	0+6 0+5; 0+1 0+2; 0+2 0+0; 0+0 0+2; 0+3 0+1	+3:15.2
10	10	Finland Olli Hiidensalo; Tero Seppälä; Jimi Klemettinen; Arttu Heikkinen	1:22:12.5; 20:07.5; 19:48.2; 21:04.7; 21:12.1	0+2 0+7; 0+0 0+2; 0+0 0+1; 0+2 0+1; 0+0 0+3	+3:54.4
11	13	Estonia Rene Zahkna; Jakob Kulbin; Kristo Siimer; Mehis Udam	1:22:38.0; 19:59.4; 20:17.0; 20:34.5; 21:47.1	0+2 0+4; 0+1 0+0; 0+0 0+0; 0+1 0+2; 0+0 0+2	+4:19.9
12	12	Austria Patrick Jakob; Simon Eder; Fredrik Mühlbacher; David Komatz	1:23:01.7; 19:52.9; 21:23.0; 21:20.8; 20:25.0	0+5 1+5; 0+2 0+0; 0+0 1+3; 0+2 0+2; 0+1 0+0	+4:43.6
13	5	Slovenia Miha Dovžan; Jakov Fak; Anton Vidmar; Lovro Planko	1:23:27.4; 20:40.5; 20:10.5; 21:12.7; 21:23.7	0+2 1+5; 0+1 0+1; 0+0 0+1; 0+1 0+0; 0+0 1+3	+5:09.3
14	14	Belgium Thierry Langer; Florent Claude; Marek Mackels; César Beauvais	1:23:29.0; 20:11.9; 20:21.3; 21:14.4; 21:41.4	0+4 0+4; 0+1 0+3; 0+1 0+0; 0+2 0+0; 0+0 0+1	+5:10.9
15	15	Bulgaria Blagoy Todev; Vladimir Iliev; Vasil Zashev; Konstantin Vasilev	1:24:01.9; 20:25.7; 20:25.6; 21:11.8; 21:58.8	0+4 0+6; 0+2 0+0; 0+0 0+2; 0+0 0+2; 0+2 0+2	+5:43.8
16	16	Poland Konrad Badacz; Jan Guńka; Fabian Suchodolski; Marcin Zawół	1:25:51.0; 20:13.4; 21:03.5; 21:45.6; 22:48.5	0+4 0+7; 0+0 0+2; 0+2 0+1; 0+1 0+2; 0+1 0+2	+7:32.9
17	20	Canada Logan Pletz; Adam Runnalls; Zachary Connelly; Haldan Borglum	1:27:04.5; 20:30.7; 21:13.6; 21:59.3; 23:20.9	0+4 0+4; 0+0 0+1; 0+2 0+0; 0+0 0+2; 0+2 0+1	+8:46.4
18	17	Lithuania Maksim Fomin; Vytautas Strolia; Jokūbas Mačkinė; Nikita Čigak	LAP; 20:40.7; 20:35.5; 22:28.8	0+2 0+0; 0+0 0+0; 0+2 0+0; 0+3	
19	21	Latvia Renārs Birkentāls; Edgars Mise; Aleksandrs Patrijuks; Andrejs Rastorgujevs	LAP; 21:10.7; 21:16.7; 21:32.2	0+0 0+3; 0+0 0+2; 0+3 0+0; 0+3	
20	23	Moldova Mihail Usov; Pavel Magazeev; Maksim Makarov; Andrei Usov	LAP; 20:31.9; 21:05.1; 21:07.1	0+2 0+1; 0+0 0+2; 0+2 0+1; 0+3	
21	22	Slovakia Jakub Borguľa; Artur Iskhakov; Tomáš Sklenárik; Damián Cesnek	LAP; 20:51.0; 21:49.2	0+2 0+3; 0+2 0+1; 1+3 0+2	
22	18	Romania George Buta; Dmitrii Shamaev; George Colțea; Raul Flore	LAP; 21:44.2; 21:30.9	0+3 0+1; 0+1 0+0; 2+3 0+2	
23	19	Kazakhstan Alexandr Mukhin; Vladislav Kireyev; Asset Dyussenov; Vadim Kurales	LAP; 23:17.1	3+3 1+3; 0+2 0+0	
