= Philipp Horn =

German biathlete (born 1994)

Phillip Horn
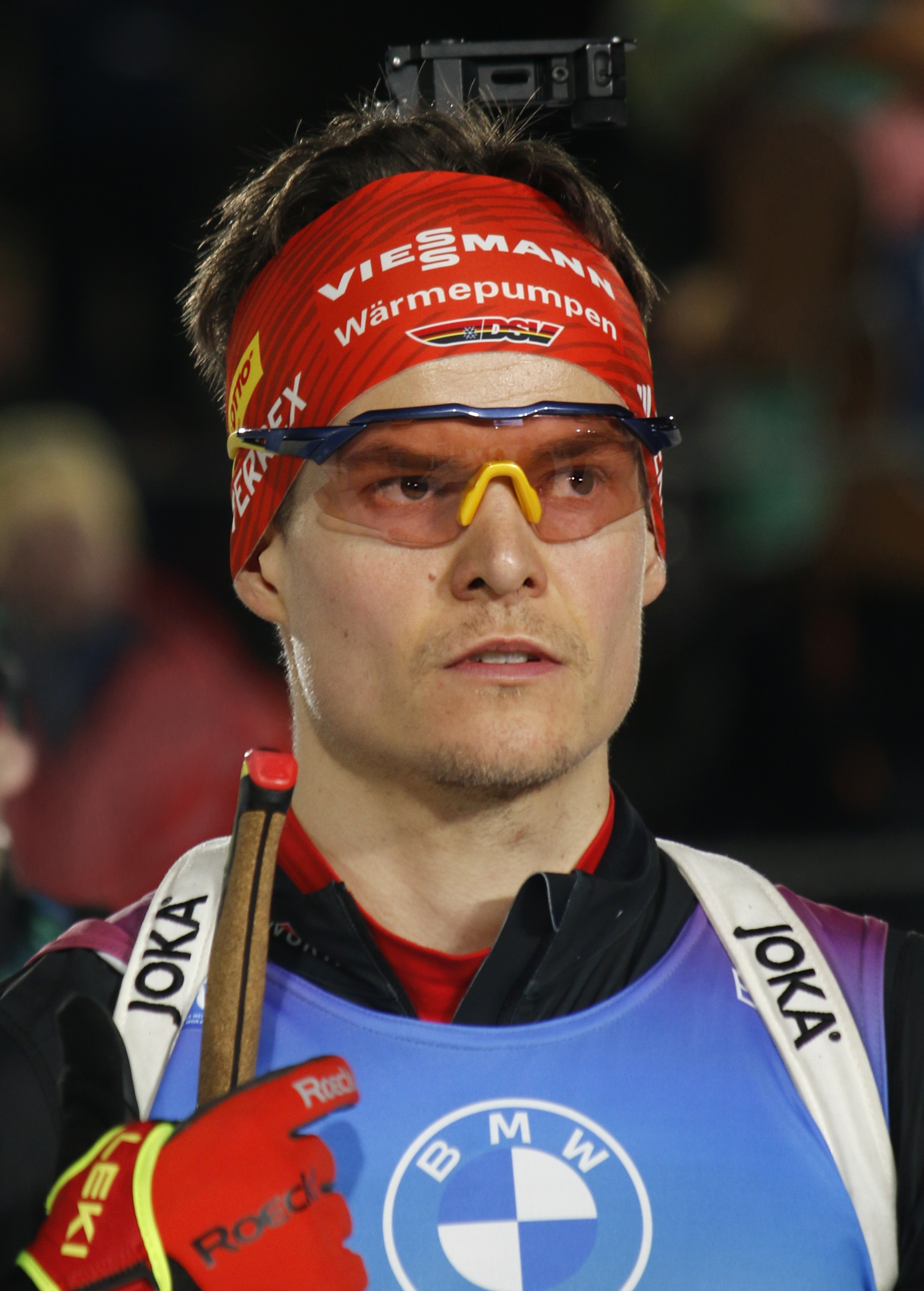
- Horn in 2024

Personal information
- Nationality: German
- Born: 8 November 1994 (age 31) Arnstadt, Germany
- Height: 1.78 m (5 ft 10 in)
- Weight: 73 kg (161 lb)
- Spouse: Antonia Fräbel (m. 2022)

Sport

Professional information
- Sport: Biathlon
- Club: SV Eintracht Frankenhain
- World Cup debut: 2018

World Championships
- Teams: 3 (2020, 2024, 2025)
- Medals: 2 (0 gold)

World Cup
- Seasons: 7 (2018/19–)
- Individual victories: 0
- All victories: 0
- Individual podiums: 0
- All podiums: 7
- Overall titles: 0
- Discipline titles: 0
Medal record
World Championships
Bronze medal – third place	2020 Antholz	4 × 7.5 km relay
Bronze medal – third place	2025 Lenzerheide	4 × 7.5 km relay
European Championships
Silver medal – second place	2022 Arber	Mixed relay
Youth World Championships
Silver medal – second place	2013 Obertilliach	3 × 7.5 km relay

Phillip Horn (born 8 November 1994) is a German biathlete. He competed at the Biathlon World Championships 2020. In May 2022, he married cross-country skier Antonia Fräbel.

== Biathlon results ==
All results are sourced from the International Biathlon Union.

0 medals

Event	Individual	Sprint	Pursuit	Mass start	Relay	Mixed relay
(Italy) 2026 Milano Cortina	40th	10th	11th	4th	4th	—

=== World Championships ===
1 medal (1 bronze)

Event	Individual	Sprint	Pursuit	Mass start	Relay	Mixed relay	Single mixed relay
(Italy) 2020 Antholz	21st	8th	18th	24th	Bronze	—	—
(Czech Republic) 2024 Nové Město	43rd	25th				—	
(Switzerland) 2025 Lenzerheide	7th	44th	17th	13th	Bronze		

*During Olympic seasons competitions are only held for those events not included in the Olympic program.

=== World Cup ===
Season	Overall		Individual		Sprint		Pursuit		Mass start	
Season	Points	Position	Points	Position	Points	Position	Points	Position	Points	Position
2018–19	34	66th	—	—	13	74th	21	54th	—	—
2019–20	360	18th	61	16th	124	20th	80	20th	95	18th
2020–21	80	53rd	11	52nd	36	53rd	33	43rd	—	—
2021–22	106	46th	—	—	66	35th	40	43rd	—	—
2022–23	51	56th	—	—	51	35th	—	—	—	—
2023–24	359	20th	12	52nd	146	17th	144	18th	57	23rd
2024–25	308	23rd	9	57th	157	16th	120	19th	22	38th
2025–26	381	18th	46	20th	181	14th	100	20th	54	25th

=== Individual podiums ===
No.	Season	Date	Location	Race	Level	Placement
1	2025–26	12 December 2025	Hochfilzen, Austria	10 km Sprint	World Cup	3rd

=== Relay podiums ===
No.	Season	Date	Location	Race	Level	Placement	Teammate
1	2019–20	15 December 2019	(Austria) Hochfilzen	Relay	Biathlon World Cup	2nd	Kühn / Peiffer / Doll
2	2019–20	11 January 2020	(Germany) Oberhof	Relay	Biathlon World Cup	3rd	Kühn / Peiffer / Doll
3	2019–20	25 January 2020	(Slovenia) Pokljuka	Mixed Relay	Biathlon World Cup	3rd	Kühn / Hettich / Hinz
4	2020–21	13 December 2020	(Austria) Hochfilzen	Relay	Biathlon World Cup	3rd	Lesser / Rees / Doll
5	2021–22	23 January 2022	(Italy) Antholz-Anterselva	Relay	Biathlon World Cup	3rd	Rees / Zobel / Fratzscher
6	2023–24	7 January 2024	(Germany) Oberhof	Relay	Biathlon World Cup	2nd	Rees / Doll / Nawrath
