= Grzegorz Guzik =

Polish biathlete (born 1991)

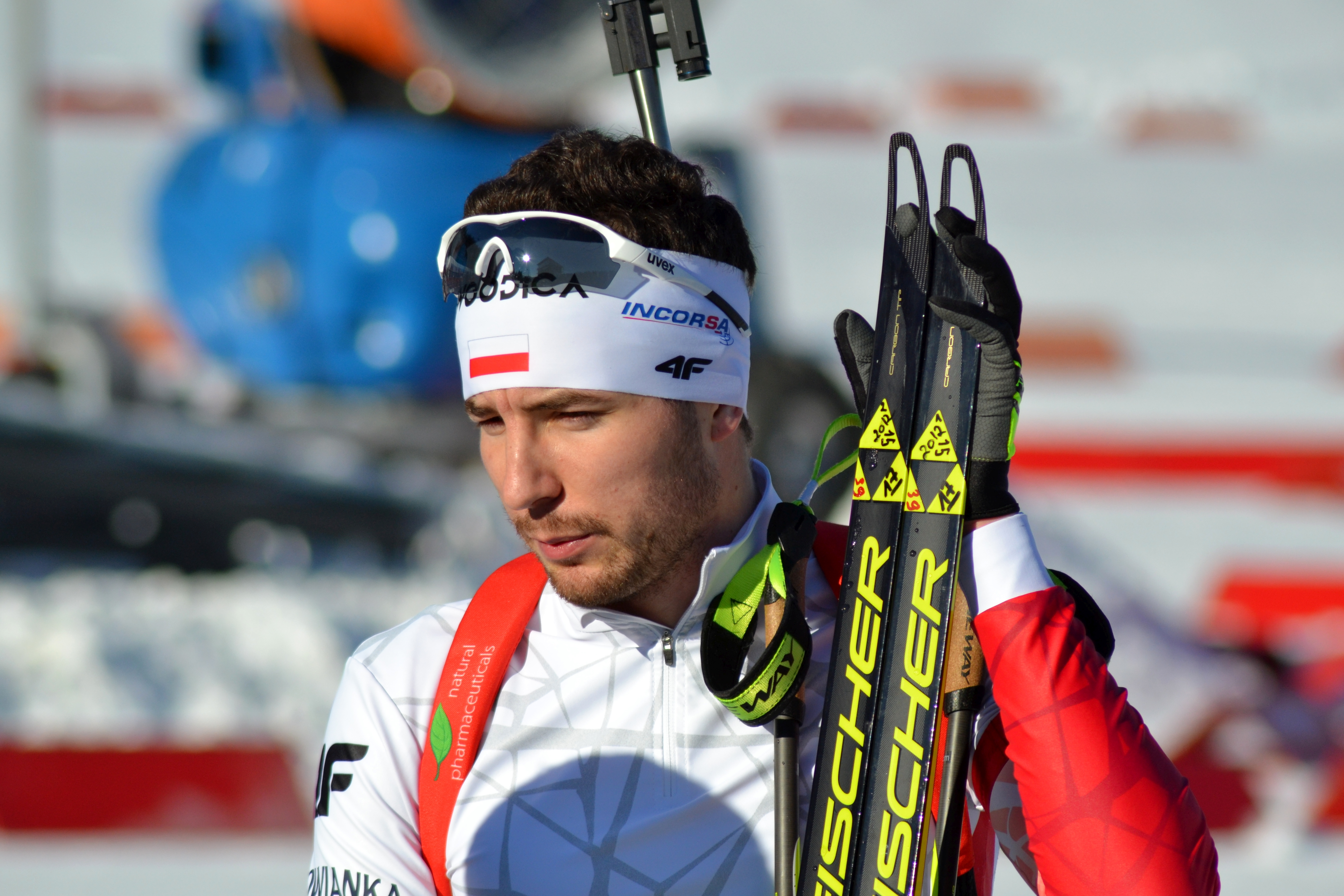
- Guzik at the European Championships 2017

Personal information
- Born: 20 August 1991 (age 34) Sucha Beskidzka, Poland
- Height: 1.83 m (6 ft 0 in)
- Weight: 68 kg (150 lb)
- Spouse: Krystyna Guzik (m. 2014)

Sport
- Country: Poland
- Sport: Biathlon

Grzegorz Guzik (born 20 August 1991) is a Polish biathlete. He competed at the Biathlon World Championships 2013 in Nové Město na Moravě. He took part at the 2014 Winter Olympics in Sochi, competing in sprint and individual.

In July 2014, Guzik married fellow biathlete Krystyna Pałka.

== Biathlon results ==
All results are sourced from the International Biathlon Union.

=== Olympic Games ===
0 medals

Event	Individual	Sprint	Pursuit	Mass start	Relay	Mixed relay
(Russia) 2014 Sochi	85th	84th	—	—	—	—
(South Korea) 2018 Pyeongchang	33rd	59th	56th	—	—	16th
(China) 2022 Beijing	49th	48th	54th	—	—	—

*The mixed relay was added as an event in 2014.

=== World Championships ===
0 medals

Event	Individual	Sprint	Pursuit	Mass start	Relay	Mixed relay	Single Mixed relay
(Czech Republic) 2013 Nové Město na Moravě	113th	—	—	—	—	—	—N/a
(Finland) 2015 Kontiolahti	77th	89th	—	—	20th	—	—N/a
(Norway) 2016 Oslo Holmenkollen	80th	78th	—	—	21st	20th	—N/a
(Austria) 2017 Hochfilzen	90th	53rd	57th	—	24th	—	—N/a
(Sweden) 2019 Östersund	—	—	—	—	—	9th	—
(Slovenia) 2021 Pokljuka	71st	64th	—	—	24th	24th	26th

*During Olympic seasons competitions are only held for those events not included in the Olympic program.
**The mixed relay was added as an event in 2005.
