= 2022–23 Biathlon World Cup – Stage 6 =

2022–23 Biathlon World Cup Stage

The 2022–23 Biathlon World Cup – Stage 6 was the third event of the season and was held in Antholz-Anterselva, Italy, from 19 to 22 January 2023.

== Schedule of events ==
The events took place at the following times.

Date	Time	Events
19 January	14:30 CET	Women's 7.5 km Sprint
20 January	14:30 CET	Men's 10 km Sprint
21 January	13:00 CET	Women's 10 km Pursuit
21 January	15:00 CET	Men's 12.5 km Pursuit
22 January	11:45 CET	4 x 6 km Women's Relay
22 January	14:30 CET	4 x 7.5 km Men's Relay

== Medal winners ==
=== Men ===
Event:	Gold:	Time	Silver:	Time	Bronze:	Time
10 km Sprint details	Johannes Thingnes Bø; Norway	22:44.1 (1+0)	Martin Ponsiluoma; Sweden	23:15.5 (1+0)	Sturla Holm Lægreid; Norway	23:21.4 (0+0)
12.5 km Pursuit details	Johannes Thingnes Bø; Norway	31:24.4 (0+0+1+1)	Sturla Holm Lægreid; Norway	32:04.6 (0+0+0+0)	Martin Ponsiluoma; Sweden	32:26.5 (1+1+0+0)
4 x 7,5 km Men Relay details	Norway; Sturla Holm Lægreid; Tarjei Bø; Johannes Thingnes Bø; Vetle Sjåstad Christiansen	1:11:50.2 (0+0) (0+1) (0+1) (0+0) (0+2) (0+0) (0+1) (0+1)	France; Antonin Guigonnat; Fabien Claude; Émilien Jacquelin; Quentin Fillon Maillet	1:12:49.2 (0+1) (0+0) (0+1) (0+1) (0+0) (0+0) (0+1) (0+2)	Germany; David Zobel; Johannes Kühn; Benedikt Doll; Roman Rees	1:14:07.7 (0+1) (0+0) (0+1) (0+1) (0+3) (0+0) (0+2) (1+3)

=== Women ===
Event:	Gold:	Time	Silver:	Time	Bronze:	Time
7.5 km Sprint details	Dorothea Wierer; Italy	20:59.6 (0+0)	Chloé Chevalier; France	21:02.4 (0+0)	Elvira Öberg; Sweden	21:08.3 (0+0)
10 km Pursuit details	Denise Herrmann-Wick; Germany	29:53.1 (0+1+0+1)	Lisa Vittozzi; Italy	30:04.1 (0+0+0+0)	Elvira Öberg; Sweden	30:10.3 (0+1+0+1)
4 x 6 km Women Relay details	France; Lou Jeanmonnot; Anaïs Chevalier-Bouchet; Chloé Chevalier; Julia Simon	1:07:21.3 (0+0) (0+1) (0+1) (0+0) (0+0) (0+0) (0+0) (0+0)	Sweden; Linn Persson; Anna Magnusson; Hanna Öberg; Elvira Öberg	1:08:06.5 (0+1) (0+0) (0+3) (0+0) (0+1) (0+0) (0+0) (0+3)	Germany; Vanessa Voigt; Sophia Schneider; Janina Hettich-Walz; Hanna Kebinger	1:08:38.2 (0+0) (0+2) (0+1) (0+2) (0+1) (0+1) (0+2) (0+1)
