= 2022–23 Biathlon World Cup – Stage 2 =

2022–23 Biathlon World Cup Stage

The 2022–23 Biathlon World Cup – Stage 2 was the second event of the season and was held in Hochfilzen, Austria, from 8 to 11 December 2022.

== Schedule of events ==
The events took place at the following times.

Date	Time	Events
8 December	14:10 CET	Women's 7.5 km Sprint
9 December	13:45 CET	Men's 10 km Sprint
10 December	11:30 CET	Women's 10 km Pursuit
10 December	13:40 CET	4 x 7.5 km Men's Relay
11 December	11:30 CET	4 x 6 km Women's Relay
11 December	14:15 CET	Men's 12.5 km Pursuit

== Medal winners ==
=== Men ===
Event:	Gold:	Time	Silver:	Time	Bronze:	Time
10 km Sprint details	Johannes Thingnes Bø; Norway	23:04.0 (0+0)	Émilien Jacquelin; France	23:47.0 (0+1)	Sturla Holm Lægreid; Norway	23:50.9 (0+1)
4 x 7,5 km Men Relay details	Norway; Sturla Holm Lægreid; Filip Fjeld Andersen; Johannes Thingnes Bø; Vetle Sjåstad Christiansen	1:18:02.6 (0+0) (0+3) (0+0) (0+1) (0+0) (0+0) (0+0) (1+3)	Sweden; Jesper Nelin; Martin Ponsiluoma; Peppe Femling; Sebastian Samuelsson	1:18:22.6 (0+1) (0+1) (0+2) (0+2) (0+1) (0+0) (0+0) (0+1)	Germany; Justus Strelow; Johannes Kühn; Roman Rees; Benedikt Doll	1:18:31.2 (0+1) (0+0) (0+0) (1+3) (0+0) (0+0) (0+0) (0+1)
12.5 km Pursuit details	Johannes Thingnes Bø; Norway	33:50.7 (0+1+0+1)	Sturla Holm Lægreid; Norway	34:38.6 (0+0+1+1)	Émilien Jacquelin; France	35:04.6 (0+1+1+1)

=== Women ===
Event:	Gold:	Time	Silver:	Time	Bronze:	Time
7.5 km Sprint details	Denise Herrmann-Wick; Germany	20:07.1 (0+0)	Markéta Davidová; Czech Republic	20:25.2 (0+1)	Julia Simon; France	20:27.2 (0+1)
10 km Pursuit details	Julia Simon; France	29:56.7 (0+0+1+0)	Ingrid Landmark Tandrevold; Norway	30:16.3 (0+0+1+0)	Markéta Davidová; Czech Republic	30:24.8 (0+0+2+0)
4 x 6 km Women Relay details	France; Lou Jeanmonnot; Anaïs Chevalier-Bouchet; Chloé Chevalier; Julia Simon	1:14:27.1 (0+1) (0+0) (0+0) (0+2) (0+0) (0+1) (0+0) (0+0)	Sweden; Linn Persson; Anna Magnusson; Hanna Öberg; Elvira Öberg	1:14:37.5 (0+0) (0+0) (0+2) (0+0) (0+3) (0+2) (0+1) (0+1)	Italy; Rebecca Passler; Dorothea Wierer; Samuela Comola; Lisa Vittozzi	1:14:45.6 (0+0) (0+0) (0+0) (0+0) (0+0) (0+1) (0+2) (0+1)
