= 2022–23 Biathlon World Cup – Stage 1 =

2022–23 Biathlon World Cup Stage

The 2022–23 Biathlon World Cup – Stage 1 was the first event of the season and was held in Kontiolahti, Finland, from 29 November to 4 December 2022. The event consisted of three individual competitions and one relay for both genders. World cup leaders after the events in Kontiolahti were Johannes Thingnes Bø for men and Lisa Vittozzi for the women.

== Schedule of events ==
The events took place at the following times.

| Date | Time | Events |
|---|---|---|
| 29 November | 14:15 EET | Men's 20 km Individual |
| 30 November | 14:15 EET | Women's 15 km Individual |
| 1 December | 12:00 EET | 4 x 7.5 km Men's Relay |
| 1 December | 14:35 EET | 4 x 6 km Women's Relay |
| 3 December | 11:45 EET | Men's 10 km Sprint |
| 3 December | 14:45 EET | Women's 7.5 km Sprint |
| 4 December | 13:15 EET | Men's 12.5 km Pursuit |
| 4 December | 15:15 EET | Women's 10 km Pursuit |

== Medal winners ==
=== Men ===
| Event: | Gold: | Time | Silver: | Time | Bronze: | Time |
|---|---|---|---|---|---|---|
| 20 km Individual | Martin Ponsiluoma; Sweden | 49:36.5 (0+1+0+0) | Niklas Hartweg; Switzerland | 50:13.7 (0+0+0+0) | David Zobel; Germany | 50:35.8 (0+0+0+0) |
| 10 km Sprint | Johannes Thingnes Bø; Norway | 31:25.4 (0+1) | Sturla Holm Lægreid; Norway | 31:28.3 (0+0) | Roman Rees; Germany | 31:29.9 (0+0) |
| 12.5 km Pursuit | Johannes Thingnes Bø; Norway | 32:44.4 (0+0+1+2) | Sturla Holm Lægreid; Norway | +19.2 (0+0+1+1) | Émilien Jacquelin; France | +47.3 (0+0+0+2) |
| 4 x 7.5 km Men Relay | Norway; Vetle Sjåstad Christiansen; Sturla Holm Lægreid; Tarjei Bø; Johannes Thingnes Bø | 1:19:26.2 (0+0) (0+1) (0+1) (0+3) (0+0) (0+1) (0+1) (0+0) | Germany; Justus Strelow; Johannes Kühn; Benedikt Doll; Roman Rees | 1:20:10.1 (0+0) (0+0) (0+2) (0+3) (0+0) (0+1) (0+1) (0+2) | France; Eric Perot; Fabien Claude; Émilien Jacquelin; Quentin Fillon Maillet | 1:20:32.1 (0+2) (0+0) (0+0) (0+2) (0+0) (0+1) (0+2) (0+1) |

=== Women ===
| Event: | Gold: | Time | Silver: | Time | Bronze: | Time |
|---|---|---|---|---|---|---|
| 15 km Individual | Hanna Öberg; Sweden | 43:53.8 (0+0+0+1) | Ingrid Landmark Tandrevold; Norway | 44:30.3 (0+0+0+0) | Lisa Vittozzi; Italy | 44:33.5 (1+0+0+0) |
| 7.5 km Sprint | Lisa Theresa Hauser; Austria | 20:39.5 (0+0) | Lisa Vittozzi; Italy | 20:56.8 (1+0) | Linn Persson; Sweden | 21:03.7 (0+0) |
| 10 km Pursuit | Julia Simon; France | 31:13.0 (0+0+0+0) | Dorothea Wierer; Italy | +11.9 (0+0+0+0) | Elvira Öberg; Sweden | +21.7 (1+0+0+1) |
| 4 x 5 km Women Relay | Sweden; Linn Persson; Anna Magnusson; Hanna Öberg; Elvira Öberg | 1:14:59.8 (0+0) (0+1) (0+0) (0+1) (0+2) (0+2) (0+0) (0+0) | Germany; Anna Weidel; Sophia Schneider; Vanessa Voigt; Denise Herrmann-Wick | 1:15:27.9 (0+0) (0+0) (0+1) (0+1) (0+1) (0+1) (0+0) (0+2) | Norway; Karoline Knotten; Ida Lien; Ragnhild Femsteinevik; Ingrid Landmark Tandrevold | 1:15:31.3 (0+1) (0+0) (0+0) (0+1) (0+0) (0+0) (0+0) (0+1) |
