= George Colțea =

Romanian biathlete (born 2000)

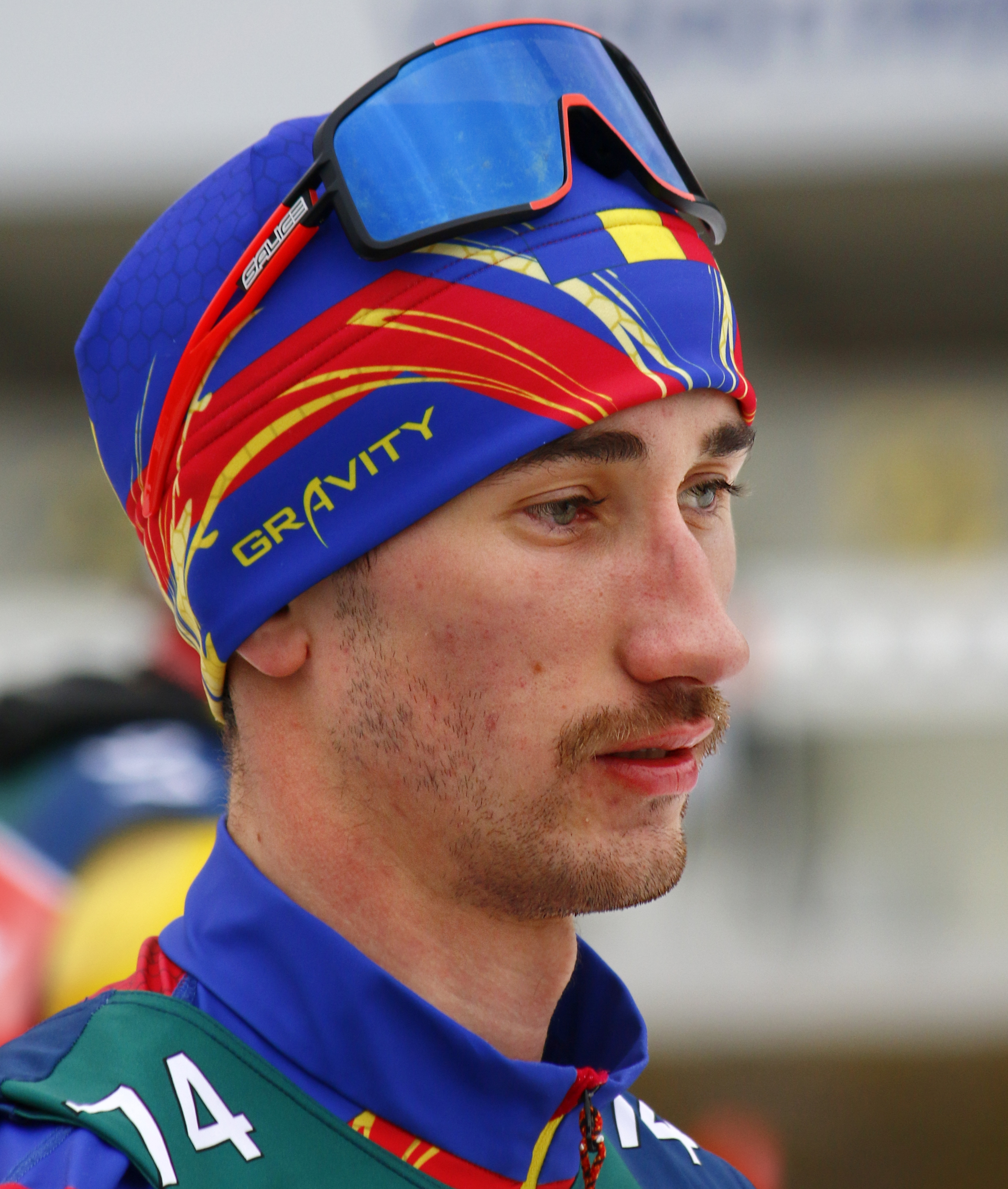
- Colțea in 2024

Personal information
- Full name: George Marian Colțea
- Nationality: Romania
- Born: 17 May 2000 (age 26) Zărnești, Romania

Sport
- Sport: Skiing
- Club: CS Dinamo

George Marian Colțea (born 17 May 2000) is a Romanian biathlete who competed at the 2022 Winter Olympics. His coach is Gheorghe Garnita.

== Career results ==
=== Olympic Games ===
0 medals

Event	Individual	Sprint	Pursuit	Mass start	Relay	Mixed relay
(China) 2022 Beijing	89th	89th	—	—	—	—
(Italy) 2026 Milano Cortina	54th	67th	—	—	20th	—

=== World Championships ===
0 medals

Event	Individual	Sprint	Pursuit	Mass start	Relay	Mixed relay	Single mixed relay
(Italy) 2020 Antholz	—	77th	—	—	23rd	—	27th
(Germany) 2023 Oberhof	—	32nd	42nd	—	8th	—	—
(Czech Republic) 2024 Nové Město na Moravě	27th	48th	DNS	—	15th	—	—
(Switzerland) 2025 Lenzerheide	35th	66th	—	—	22nd	—	19th
