= Paul Schommer =

American biathlete (born 1992)

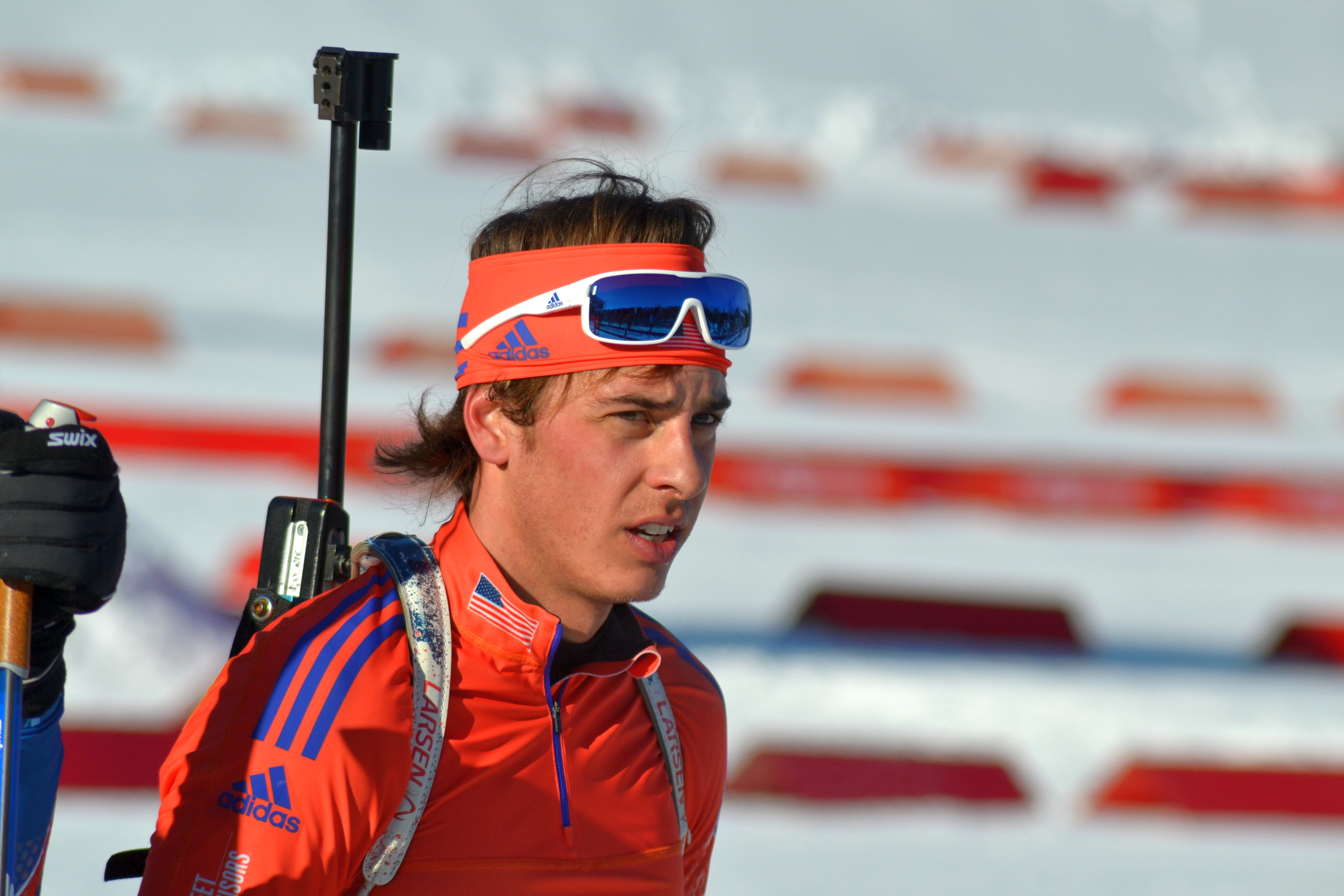
- Schommer in 2017

Personal information
- Nationality: American
- Born: June 6, 1992 (age 34) Appleton, Wisconsin, U.S.
- Height: 6 ft 1 in (185 cm)

Sport
- Sport: Skiing
- Club: Moose Nordic

Paul Schommer (born June 6, 1992) is an American biathlete who represented the United States at the 2022 Winter Olympics. His first IBU cup podium finish was a silver finish in 2019 for the men's 10 km sprint competition at Obertilliach.

He retired at the end of the 2025–2026 season.

== Biathlon results ==
All results are sourced from the International Biathlon Union.

=== Olympic Games ===
0 medals

Event	Individual	Sprint	Pursuit	Mass start	Relay	Mixed relay
(China) 2022 Beijing	35th	74th	—	—	13th	7th
(Italy) 2026 Milano Cortina	44th	47th	48th	—	5th	—

=== World Championships ===
0 medals

Event	Individual	Sprint	Pursuit	Mass start	Relay	Mixed relay	Single Mixed relay
(Italy) 2020 Antholz	48th	72nd	—	—	8th	—	—
(Slovenia) 2021 Pokljuka	73rd	71st	—	—	15th	—	—
(Germany) 2023 Oberhof	77th	31st	52nd	—	12th	13th	11th
(Switzerland) 2025 Lenzerheide	24th	56th	56th	—	9th	—	—

*During Olympic seasons, competitions are only held for those events not included in the Olympic program.
**The single mixed relay was added as an event in 2019.

== Personal life ==
Schommer is a Christian. He has said, “My identity doesn’t come from my results, and it doesn’t come from affirmation of others but it comes through my identity in Christ because He’s the One who gives me my meaning.”
