= Jake Brown (biathlete) =

American biathlete (born 1992)

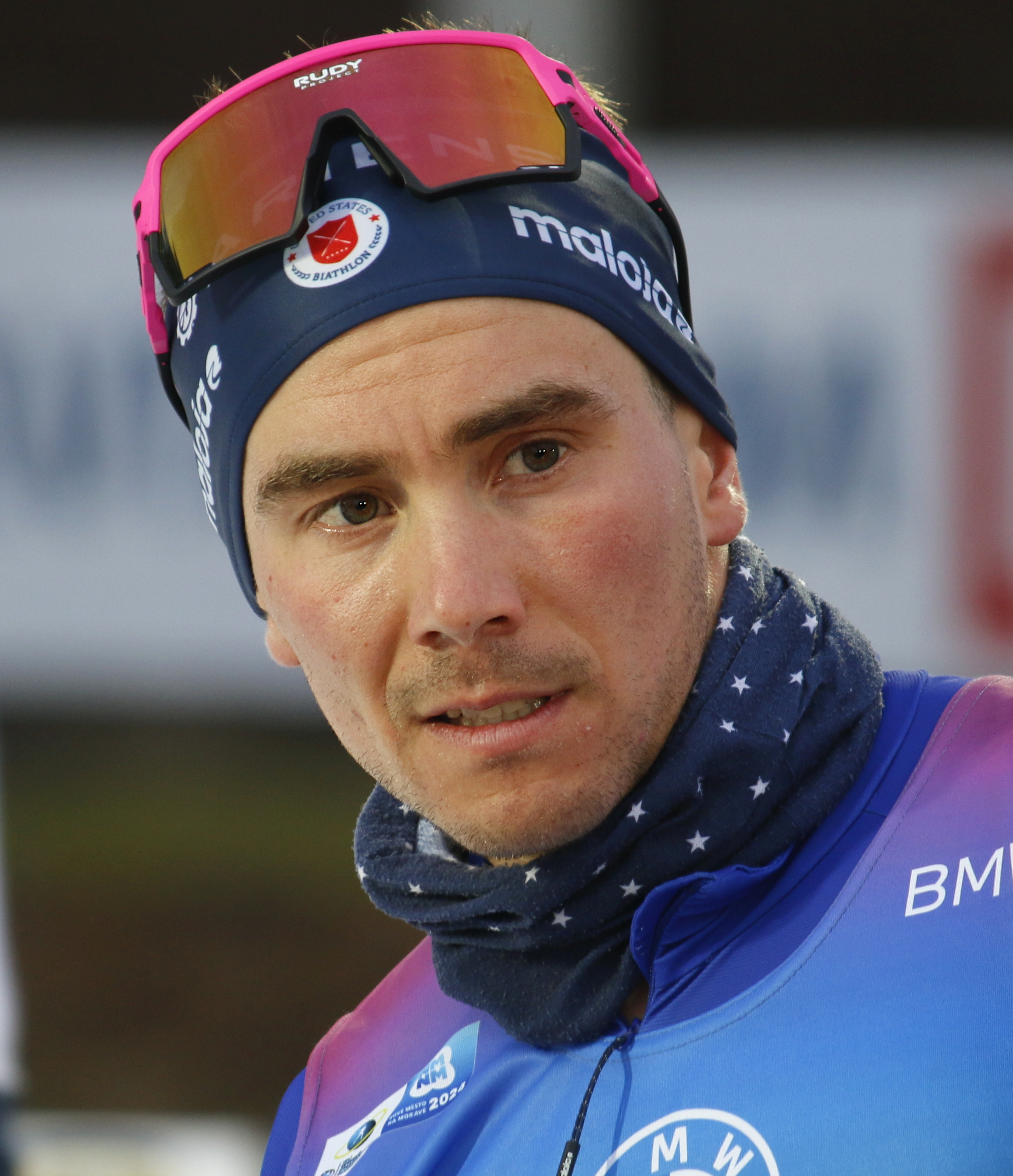

Personal information
- Born: 28 March 1992 (age 34) Edina, Minnesota, United States

Sport
- Sport: Biathlon
- College team: St. Olaf College, Northern Michigan University
- Club: Green Racing Project (Craftsbury, VT), Moose Nordic (St. Paul, MN)

Jake Brown (born 28 March 1992) is an American biathlete. He represented the United States at the 2022 Winter Olympics. He retired at the end of the 2025–2026 season.

== Career results ==
All results are sourced from the International Biathlon Union.

=== World Championships ===
Event	Individual	Sprint	Pursuit	Mass start	Relay	Mixed relay	Single mixed relay
(Sweden) 2019 Östersund	68th	58th	53rd	—	19th	—	—
(Italy) 2020 Antholz	46th	68th	—	—	8th	—	—
(Slovenia) 2021 Pokljuka	21st	12th	24th	28th	15th	12th	—
(Czech Republic) 2024 Nové Město na Moravě	50th	38th	37th	—	5th	—	—
(Switzerland) 2025 Lenzerheide	25th	—	—	—	—	—	—

=== Olympic Games ===
0 medals

Event	Individual	Sprint	Pursuit	Mass start	Relay	Mixed relay
(China) 2022 Beijing	28th	36th	40th	—	13th	—

==== Rankings ====
Season	Individual	Sprint	Pursuit	Mass start	Overall Position
2018–19	—	88	—	—	100
2020-21	43	35	55	47	45
2021-22	29	49	54	—	49
2022-23	—	74	52	—	67
2023-24	—	65	70	—	78
