= Tomáš Mikyska =

Czech biathlete (born 2000)

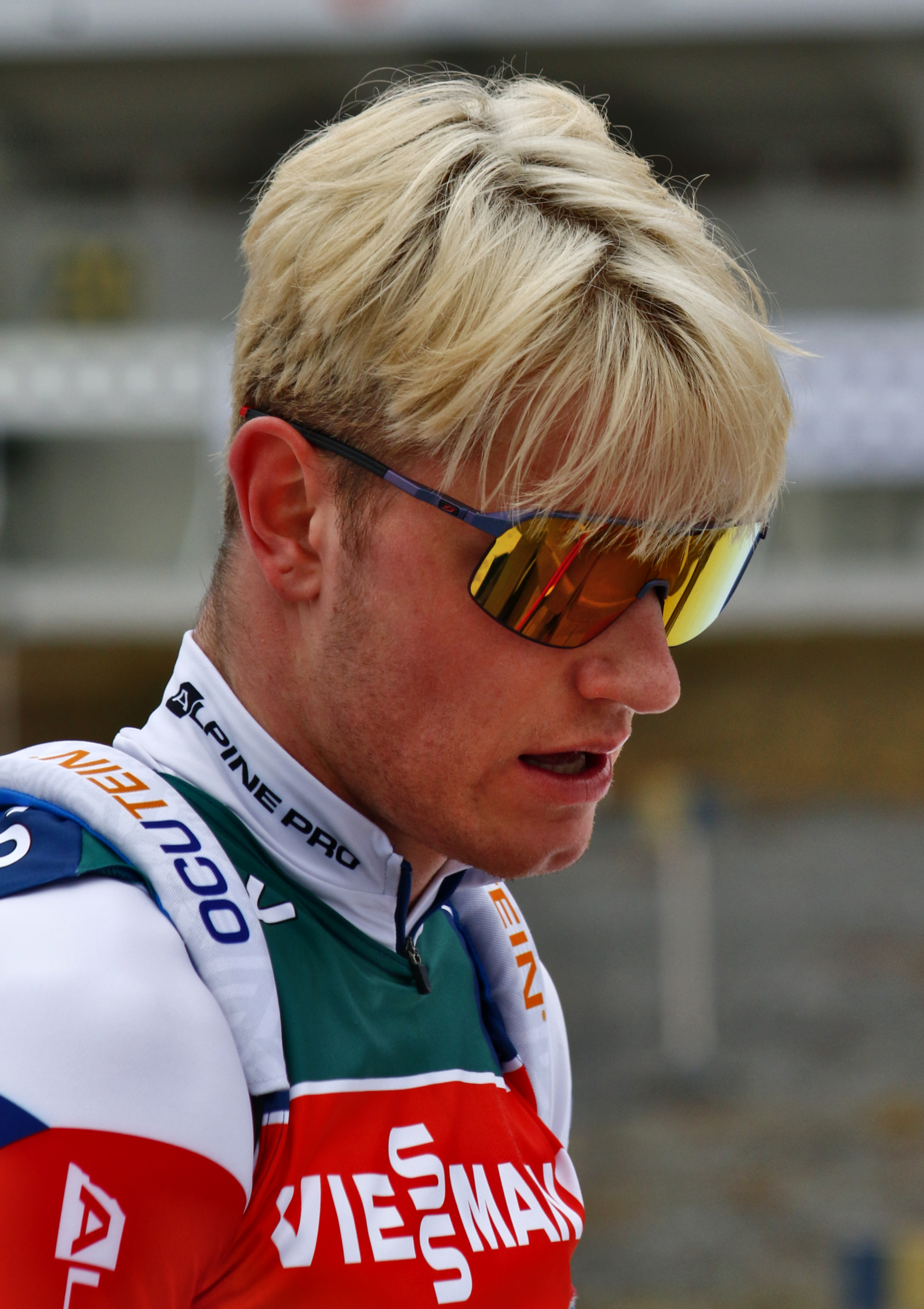
- Mikyska in 2024

Personal information
- Nationality: Czech
- Born: 2 February 2000 (age 26) Ústí nad Orlicí, Czech Republic

Sport
- Country: Czech Republic
- Sport: Biathlon
Medal record
Men's biathlon
Representing Czech Republic
Junior World Championships
Bronze medal – third place	2021 Obertilliach	4 × 7.5 km relay
Youth World Championships
Silver medal – second place	2018 Otepää	3 × 7.5 km relay

Tomáš Mikyska (born 2 February 2000) is a Czech biathlete. He made his debut in the Biathlon World Cup in 2020.

== Career ==
He made his first international appearance on 4 February 2017 in Nové Město na Moravě, where he finished 36th in the sprint at the IBU Junior Cup. At the Youth World Championships held a year later in Otepää, he won the silver medal in the relay. He competed four more times at events in this series, including winning a bronze medal in the relay at the 2021 Biathlon Junior World Championships in Obertilliach.

He made his World Cup competition debut on 29 November 2020 in Kontiolahti, finishing 60th in the sprint. He scored his first World Cup points two years later at the same venue, when he finished 32nd in the pursuit race.

His best individual result is 10th place in the individual race at the 2024 World Championships in Nové Město na Moravě.

== Biathlon results ==
All results are sourced from the International Biathlon Union.

=== World Championships ===
Event	Individual	Sprint	Pursuit	Mass start	Relay	Mixed relay
(Germany) 2023 Oberhof	14th	60th	31st	14th	4th	5th
(Czech Republic) 2024 Nové Město	10th	33rd	27th	26th	7th	14th
(Switzerland) 2025 Lenzerheide	63rd	—	—	—	6th	—

=== World Cup ===
Season	Overall			Individual		Sprint		Pursuit		Mass start	
Season	Races	Points	Position	Points	Position	Points	Position	Points	Position	Points	Position
2021–22	2/26	Didn't earn World Cup points									
2022–23	13/21	67	52nd	—	—	20	55th	47	38th	—	—
2023–24	3/21	1	94th	—	—	1	78th	—	—	—	—

=== Youth and Junior World Championships ===
2 medals (1 silver, 1 bronze)

Year	Age	Individual	Sprint	Pursuit	Relay
(Slovakia) 2017 Brezno-Osrblie	16	32nd	36th	31st	8th
(Estonia) 2018 Otepää	17	—	49th	43th	Silver
(Slovakia) 2019 Brezno-Osrblie	18	17th	5th	9th	6th
(Switzerland) 2020 Lenzerheide	19	53rd	21st	19th	6th
(Austria) 2021 Obertilliach	20	20th	12th	10th	Bronze
(United States) 2022 Soldier Hollow	21	11th	18th	8th	4th
