= Miha Dovžan =

Slovenian biathlete (born 1994)

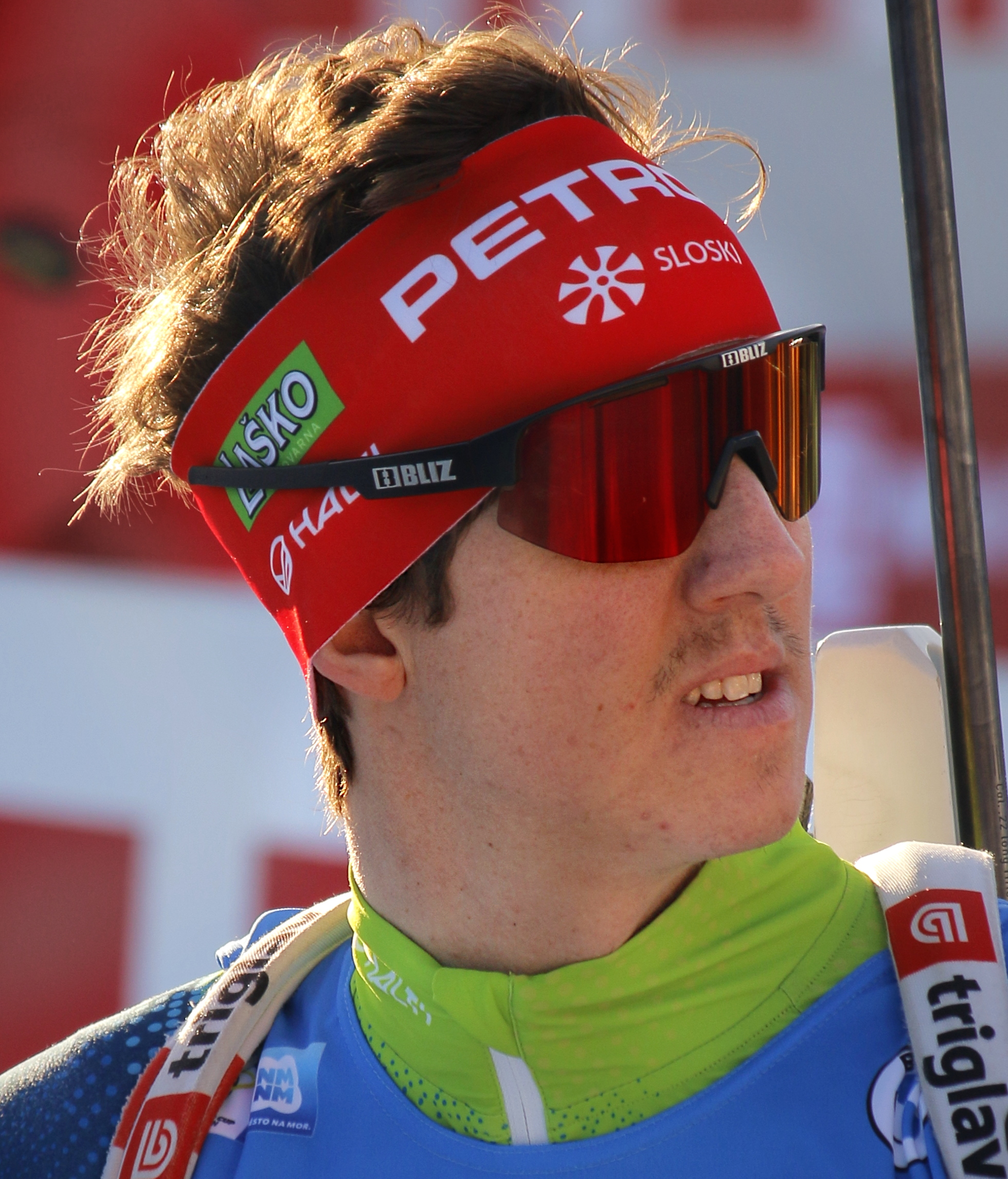
- Dovžan in 2023

Personal information
- Nationality: Slovenian
- Born: 22 January 1994 (age 32) Jesenice, Slovenia

Sport
- Sport: Biathlon

Miha Dovžan (born 22 January 1994) is a Slovenian biathlete. He competed in the 2018, 2022 and 2026 Winter Olympics.

== Career results ==
=== Olympic Games ===
0 medals

Event	Individual	Sprint	Pursuit	Mass start	Relay	Mixed relay
(South Korea) 2018 Pyeongchang	35th	53rd	59th	—	10th	—
(China) 2022 Beijing	38th	62nd	—	—	11th	20th
(Italy) 2026 Milano Cortina	20th	36th	46th	—	9th	—

=== World Championships ===
0 medals

Event	Individual	Sprint	Pursuit	Mass start	Relay	Mixed relay	Single mixed relay
(Norway) 2016 Oslo	43rd	71st	—	—	17th	—	—
(Austria) 2017 Hochfilzen	50th	64th	—	—	18th	18th	—
(Sweden) 2019 Östersund	71st	62nd	—	—	5th	25th	—
(Italy) 2020 Rasen-Antholz	64th	63rd	—	—	5th	—	—
(Slovenia) 2021 Pokljuka	22nd	24th	22nd	18th	8th	—	—
(Germany) 2023 Oberhof	46th	—	—	—	9th	12th	—
(Czech Republic) 2024 Nové Město na Moravě	17th	65th	—	—	11th	9th	—
(Switzerland) 2025 Lenzerheide	38th	61st	—	—	13th	—	—
