= 2022–23 Biathlon World Cup – Stage 3 =

2022–23 Biathlon World Cup Stage

The 2022–23 Biathlon World Cup – Stage 3 was the third event of the season and was held in Annecy-Le Grand-Bornand, France, from 15 to 18 December 2022.

== Schedule of events ==
The events took place at the following times.

Date	Time	Events
15 December	14:10 CET	Men's 10 km Sprint
16 December	14:15 CET	Women's 7.5 km Sprint
17 December	12:25 CET	Men's 12.5 km Pursuit
17 December	14:30 CET	Women's 10 km Pursuit
18 December	12:10 CET	15 km Men's Mass Start
18 December	14:15 CET	12.5 km Women's Mass Start

== Medal winners ==
=== Men ===
Event:	Gold:	Time	Silver:	Time	Bronze:	Time
10 km Sprint details	Johannes Thingnes Bø; Norway	22:52.2 (0+0)	Sturla Holm Lægreid; Norway	23:09.8 (0+0)	Benedikt Doll; Germany	23:31.0 (0+0)
12.5 km Pursuit details	Sturla Holm Lægreid; Norway	29:44.1 (0+0+1+0)	Vetle Sjåstad Christiansen; Norway	30:08.7 (0+0+0+2)	Johannes Thingnes Bø; Norway	30:19.9 (1+0+1+0)
15 km Mass Start details	Johannes Dale; Norway	35:02.2 (0+0+2+0)	Sturla Holm Lægreid; Norway	35:02.5 (0+0+1+1)	Johannes Thingnes Bø; Norway	35:12.8 (0+0+1+2)

=== Women ===
Event:	Gold:	Time	Silver:	Time	Bronze:	Time
7.5 km Sprint details	Anna Magnusson; Sweden	21:04.1 (0+0)	Linn Persson; Sweden	21:17.5 (0+1)	Denise Herrmann-Wick; Germany	21:19.9 (1+0)
10 km Pursuit details	Elvira Öberg; Sweden	29:42.4 (0+0+0+0)	Lisa Vittozzi; Italy	30:02.8 (0+2+0+0)	Julia Simon; France	30:29.3 (0+0+1+2)
12.5 km Mass Start details	Lisa Theresa Hauser; Austria	33:54.1 (0+0+1+0)	Julia Simon; France	34:06.4 (0+1+1+0)	Anaïs Chevalier-Bouchet; France	34:08.4 (0+0+0+1)
