= 2022–23 Biathlon World Cup – Stage 4 =

2022–23 Biathlon World Cup Stage

The 2022–23 Biathlon World Cup – Stage 4 was the fourth event of the season and was held in Pokljuka, Slovenia, from 5 to 8 January 2023.

== Schedule of events ==
The events took place at the following times.

Date	Time	Events
5 January	14:20 CET	Women's 7.5 km Sprint
6 January	14:20 CET	Men's 10 km Sprint
7 January	11:30 CET	Women's 10 km Pursuit
7 January	14:45 CET	Men's 12.5 km Pursuit
8 January	11:45 CET	Single Mixed Relay
8 January	14:25 CET	Mixed Relay

== Medal winners ==
=== Men ===
Event:	Gold:	Time	Silver:	Time	Bronze:	Time
10 km Sprint details	Johannes Thingnes Bø; Norway	22:55.9 (1+0)	Tarjei Bø; Norway	24:44.0 (0+0)	Sturla Holm Lægreid; Norway	24:51.5 (1+0)
12.5 km Pursuit details	Johannes Thingnes Bø; Norway	31:43.2 (0+1+1+0)	Quentin Fillon Maillet; France	32:48.1 (0+0+0+1)	Tarjei Bø; Norway	32:49.8 (0+0+0+1)

=== Women ===
Event:	Gold:	Time	Silver:	Time	Bronze:	Time
7.5 km Sprint details	Elvira Öberg; Sweden	20:25.2 (0+0)	Julia Simon; France	20:32.1 (0+0)	Dorothea Wierer; Italy	20:43.9 (0+0)
10 km Pursuit details	Elvira Öberg; Sweden	29:41.6 (0+0+0+0)	Dorothea Wierer; Italy	29:59.2 (0+0+1+0)	Julia Simon; France	30:04.0 (0+1+1+0)

=== Mixed ===
Event:	Gold:	Time	Silver:	Time	Bronze:	Time
Single Mixed Relay details	Norway; Vetle Sjåstad Christiansen; Ingrid Landmark Tandrevold	38:54.1 (0+0) (0+2) (0+0) (0+1) (0+0) (0+2) (0+0) (0+0)	France; Antonin Guigonnat; Lou Jeanmonnot	39:35.1 (0+1) (0+2) (0+1) (0+0) (0+0) (0+1) (0+0) (0+1)	Switzerland; Niklas Hartweg; Amy Baserga	39:43.7 (0+2) (0+1) (0+1) (0+1) (0+0) (0+3) (0+0) (0+0)
Mixed Relay details	France; Fabien Claude; Quentin Fillon Maillet; Anaïs Chevalier-Bouchet; Julia Simon	1:19:48.9 (0+1) (0+0) (1+3) (0+1) (0+1) (0+0) (0+0) (0+1)	Italy; Didier Bionaz; Tommaso Giacomel; Dorothea Wierer; Lisa Vittozzi	1:20:13.5 (0+1) (0+1) (0+0) (0+2) (0+2) (0+0) (0+0) (0+1)	Sweden; Jesper Nelin; Martin Ponsiluoma; Mona Brorsson; Elvira Öberg	1:20:36.1 (0+0) (0+0) (1+3) (0+1) (0+0) (0+1) (0+0) (0+0)
