= Benedikt Doll =

German biathlete (born 1990)

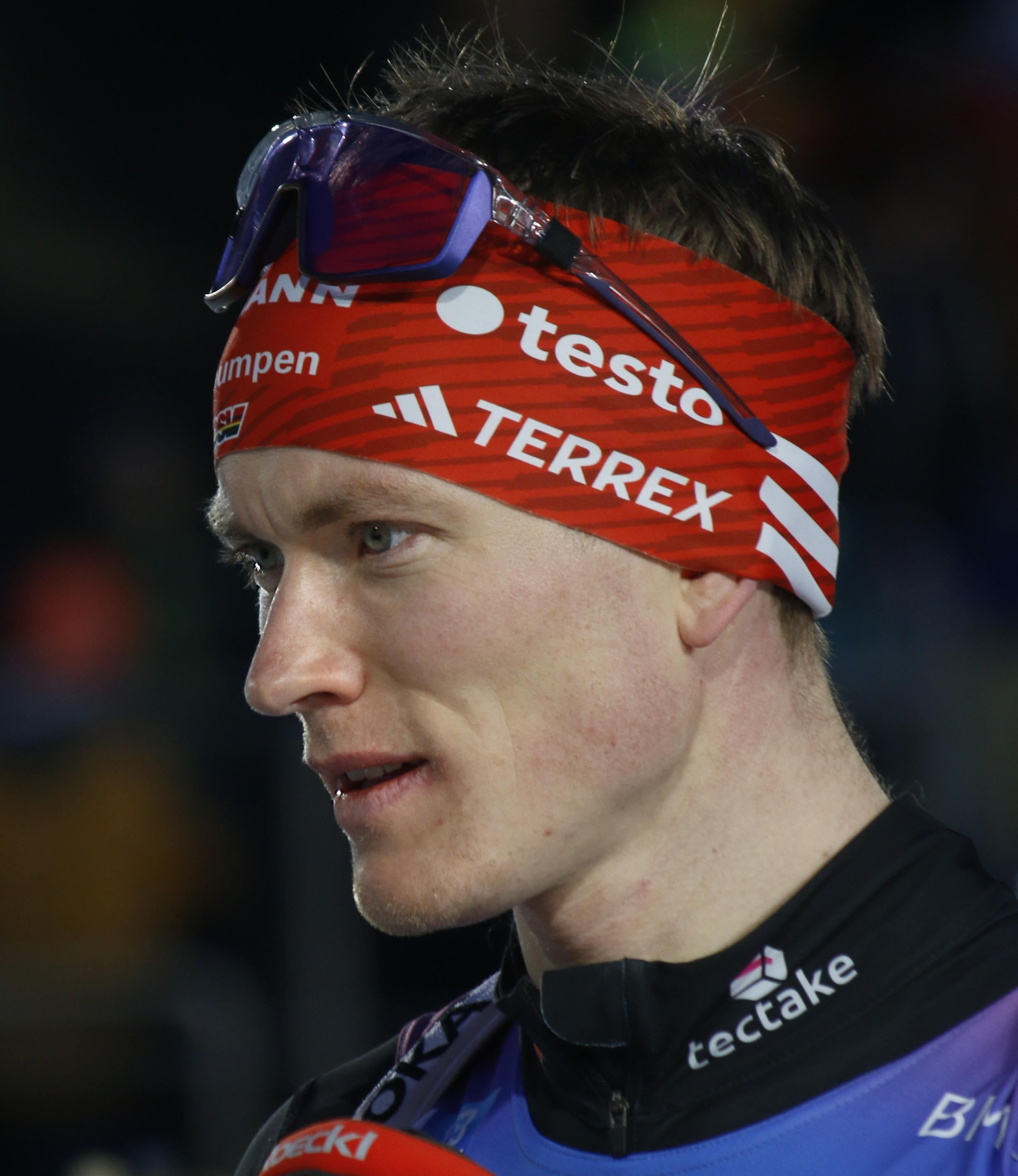
- Doll in 2024

Personal information
- Nationality: German
- Born: 24 March 1990 (age 36) Titisee-Neustadt, West Germany
- Height: 1.78 m (5 ft 10 in)
- Weight: 71 kg (157 lb)
- Website: http://www.benedikt-doll.de/

Sport
- Coached by: Roman Bottcher

Professional information
- Sport: Biathlon
- Club: SZ Breitnau
- Skis: Madshus
- World Cup debut: 2012

Olympic Games
- Teams: 1 (2018, 2022)
- Medals: 2 (0 gold)

World Championships
- Teams: 8 (2015–2024)
- Medals: 6 (1 gold)

World Cup
- Seasons: 13 (2011–)
- Individual victories: 6
- All victories: 8
- Individual podiums: 19
- All podiums: 53
Medal record
Event	1st	2nd	3rd
Olympic Games	0	0	2
World Championships	1	3	2
Total	1	3	4
Olympic Games
Bronze medal – third place	2018 Pyeongchang	12.5 km pursuit
Bronze medal – third place	2018 Pyeongchang	4 × 7.5 km relay
World Championships
Gold medal – first place	2017 Hochfilzen	10 km sprint
Silver medal – second place	2016 Oslo	4 × 7.5 km relay
Silver medal – second place	2019 Östersund	4 × 7.5 km relay
Silver medal – second place	2019 Östersund	Mixed relay
Bronze medal – third place	2020 Antholz	4 × 7.5 km relay
Bronze medal – third place	2024 Nové Město	20 km individual
Junior World Championships
Gold medal – first place	2009 Canmore	4 × 7.5 km relay
Gold medal – first place	2010 Torsby	4 × 7.5 km relay
Gold medal – first place	2011 Nové Město	4 × 7.5 km relay
Silver medal – second place	2011 Nové Město	15 km individual
Youth World Championships
Gold medal – first place	2008 Ruhpolding	3 × 7.5 km relay
European Championships
Gold medal – first place	2013 Bansko	12.5 km pursuit
Silver medal – second place	2013 Bansko	10 km sprint
Silver medal – second place	2014 Nové Město	20 km individual
Bronze medal – third place	2014 Nové Město	4x7.5 km relay
- Updated on 14 February 2024

Benedikt Doll (born 24 March 1990) is a former German biathlete and Men's sprint 2017 World Champion.

== Career ==
He competed in the 2013/14 and 2014/15 World Cup seasons, and represented Germany at the Biathlon World Championships 2015 in Kontiolahti.

== Biathlon results ==
All results are sourced from the International Biathlon Union.

=== Olympic Games ===
2 medals (2 bronze)

Year	Individual	Sprint	Pursuit	Mass start	Relay	Mixed relay
(South Korea) 2018 Pyeongchang	—	6th	Bronze	5th	Bronze	—
(China) 2022 Beijing	6th	8th	32nd	8th	4th	5th

=== World Championships ===
5 medals (1 gold, 3 silver, 2 bronze)

Year	Individual	Sprint	Pursuit	Mass start	Relay	Mixed relay	Single mixed relay
(Finland) 2015 Kontiolahti	—	10th	28th	16th	—	6th	—N/a
(Norway) 2016 Oslo	13th	33rd	39th	18th	Silver	—	—N/a
(Austria) 2017 Hochfilzen	19th	Gold	11th	9th	4th	—	—N/a
(Sweden) 2019 Östersund	10th	11th	12th	8th	Silver	Silver	—
(Italy) 2020 Antholz	12th	14th	29th	12th	Bronze	4th	—
(Slovenia) 2021 Pokljuka	8th	39th	31st	23rd	7th	—	—
(Germany) 2023 Oberhof	5th	55th	15th	26th	5th	6th	—
(Czech Republic) 2024 Nové Město	Bronze	13th	16th	12th	4th	—	—

*During Olympic seasons competitions are only held for those events not included in the Olympic program.
**The single mixed relay was added as an event in 2019.

=== Individual victories ===
6 victories (4 Sp, 1 In, 1 MS)

No.	Season	Date	Location	Race	Level
1	2016–17	11 February 2017	Hochfilzen, Austria	10 km Sprint	World Championships
2	2019–20	19 December 2019	Le Grand-Bornand, France	10 km Sprint	World Cup
3	2021–22	22 January 2022	Antholz-Anterselva, Italy	15 km Mass Start	World Cup
4	2022–23	9 March 2023	Östersund, Sweden	20 km Individual	World Cup
5	2023–24	15 December 2023	Lenzerheide, Switzerland	10 km Sprint	World Cup
6	2023–24	5 January 2024	Oberhof, Germany	10 km Sprint	World Cup

=== Relay victories ===
No.	Season	Date	Location	Level	Teammate
1	2016–17	21 January 2017	Antholz, Italy	Biathlon World Cup	Lesser / Peiffer / Schempp
2	2020–21	5 March 2021	Nové Město, Czech Republic	Biathlon World Cup	Lesser / Peiffer / Nawrath
