= Johannes Kühn =

German biathlete (born 1991)

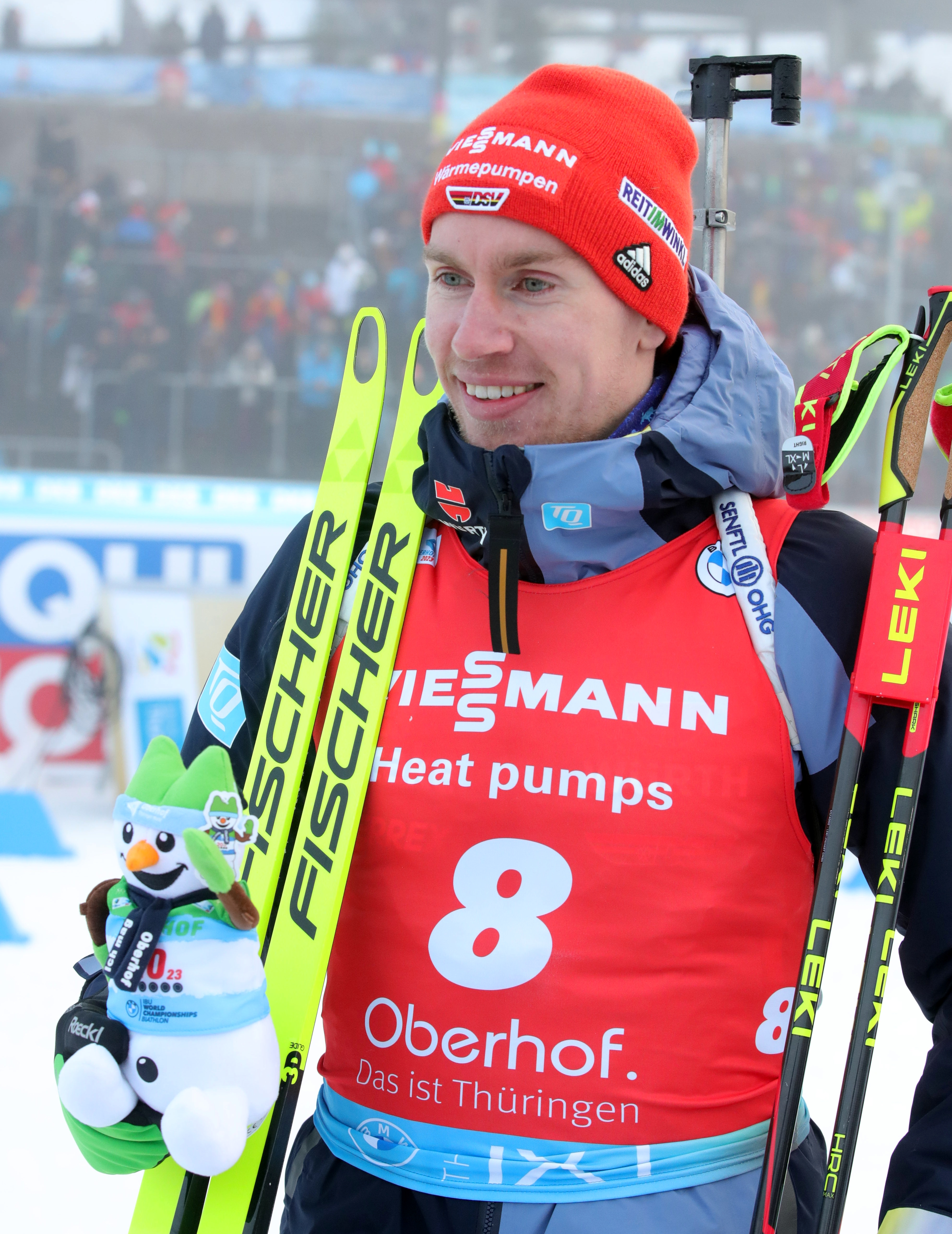
- Kühn in 2023

Personal information
- Nationality: German
- Born: 19 November 1991 (age 34) Passau, Germany
- Height: 1.88 m (6 ft 2 in)
- Weight: 82 kg (181 lb)

Sport

Professional information
- Sport: Biathlon
- Club: WSV Reit im Winkl
- World Cup debut: 2012

Olympic Games
- Teams: 1 (2018)
- Medals: 0 (0 gold)

World Championships
- Teams: 6 (2019–2025)
- Medals: 1 (0 gold)

World Cup
- Seasons: 12 (2012/13, 2014/15–2015/16, 2017/18–2025/26)
- Individual victories: 1
- All victories: 0
- Individual podiums: 5
- All podiums: 20
- Overall titles: 0
- Discipline titles: 0
Medal record
Men's biathlon
Representing Germany
World Championships
Bronze medal – third place	2025 Lenzerheide	4 × 7.5 km relay
Junior World Championships
Gold medal – first place	2010 Torsby	4 × 7.5 km relay
Gold medal – first place	2011 Nové Město	12.5 km pursuit
Gold medal – first place	2011 Nové Město	4 × 7.5 km relay
Silver medal – second place	2011 Nové Město	10 km sprint
Youth World Championships
Gold medal – first place	2010 Torsby	7.5 km sprint
Silver medal – second place	2010 Torsby	10 km pursuit
European Championships
Gold medal – first place	2012 Osrblie	4 x 7.5 km relay
Bronze medal – third place	2021 Duszniki-Zdrój	10 km sprint

Johannes Kühn (born 19 November 1991) is a German biathlete. He competed in the 2018 Winter Olympics.

== Biathlon results ==
All results are sourced from the International Biathlon Union.

=== Olympic Games ===
Event	Individual	Sprint	Pursuit	Mass start	Relay	Mixed relay
(South Korea) 2018 Pyeongchang	58th	—	—	—	—	—
(China) 2022 Beijing	51st	33rd	12th	10th	—	—

=== World Championships ===
1 medal (1 bronze)

Event	Individual	Sprint	Pursuit	Mass Start	Relay	Mixed Relay	Single mixed relay
(Sweden) 2019 Östersund	—	23rd	24th	—	—	—	—
(Italy) 2020 Antholz	26th	40th	28th	10th	—	—	—
(Slovenia) 2021 Pokljuka	23rd	44th	40th	—	—	—	—
(Germany) 2023 Oberhof	—	8th	6th	21st	5th	—	—
(Czech Republic) 2024 Nové Město	19th	14th		14th	4th	—	
(Switzerland) 2025 Lenzerheide	12th				Bronze		

*During Olympic seasons competitions are only held for those events not included in the Olympic program.
**The single mixed relay was added as an event in 2019.
