= Roman Rees =

German biathlete (born 1993)

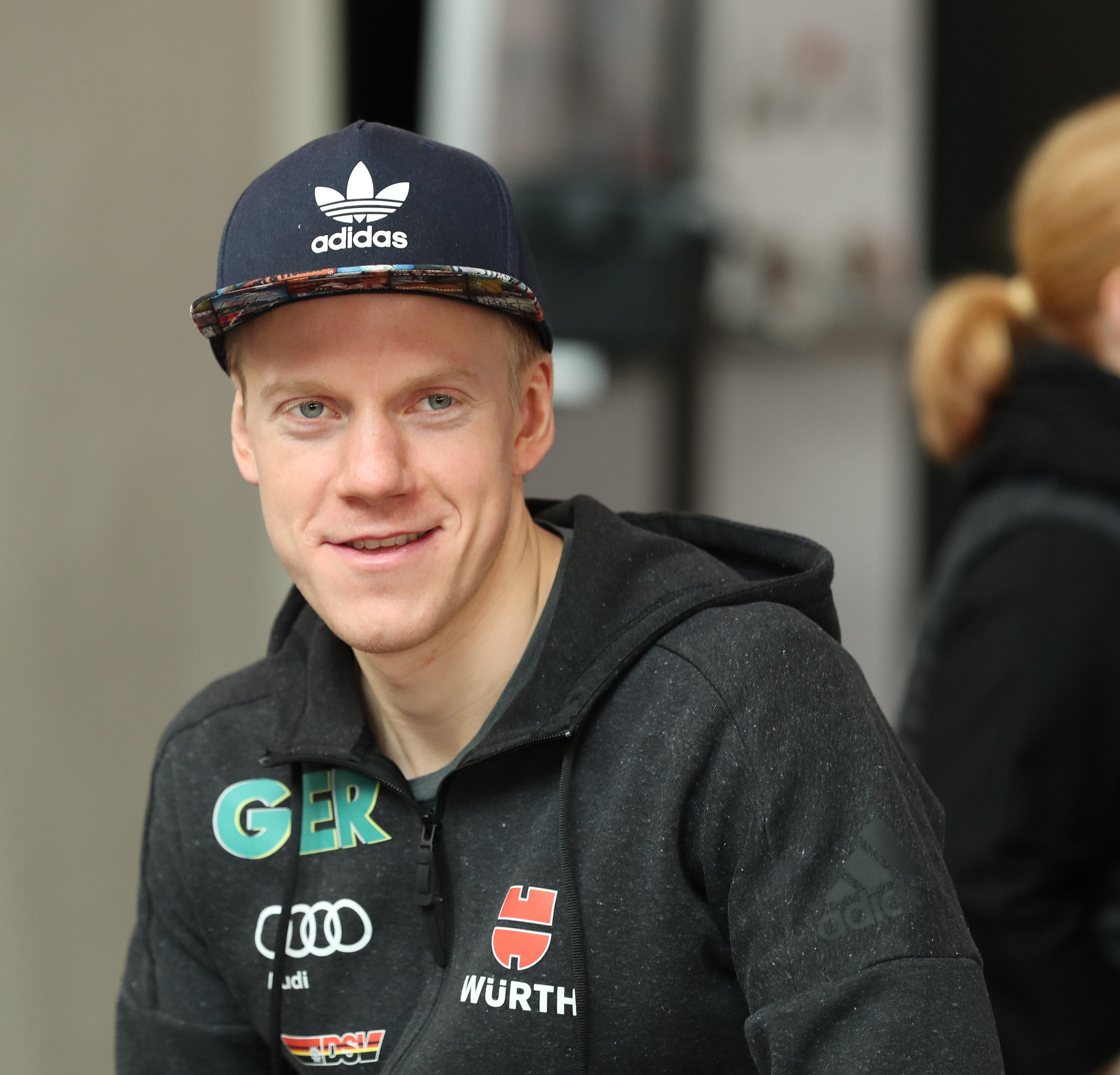
- Rees in 2018

Personal information
- Nationality: German
- Born: 1 March 1993 (age 33) Freiburg im Breisgau, Germany
- Height: 1.83 m (6 ft 0 in)
- Weight: 75 kg (165 lb)

Sport

Professional information
- Sport: Biathlon
- Club: SV Schauinsland
- World Cup debut: 2016

World Championships
- Teams: 4 (2019–2024)
- Medals: 1 (0 gold)

World Cup
- Seasons: 5 (2016/17–)
- Individual victories: 1
- All victories: 0
- Individual podiums: 2
- All podiums: 13
- Overall titles: 0
- Discipline titles: 0
Medal record
World Championships
Silver medal – second place	2019 Östersund	4 × 7.5 km relay
European Championships
Silver medal – second place	2025 Val Martello	4 × 7.5 km relay
Junior World Championships
Gold medal – first place	2014 Presque Isle	4 × 7.5 km relay

Roman Rees (born 1 March 1993) is a German biathlete. His greatest success is winning the silver medal with the German relay team at the Biathlon World Championships 2019.

On 26 November 2023 he won his first World Cup victory in the individual race, making him the first German World Cup leader since Michael Greis in 2008.

== Biathlon results ==
All results are sourced from the International Biathlon Union.

=== Olympic Games ===
Event	Individual	Sprint	Pursuit	Mass start	Relay	Mixed relay
(China) 2022 Beijing	7th	17th	6th	14th	4th	—

=== World Championships ===
1 medal (1 silver)

Event	Individual	Sprint	Pursuit	Mass Start	Relay	Mixed Relay	Single mixed relay
(Sweden) 2019 Östersund	20th	—	—		Silver	—	—
(Slovenia) 2021 Pokljuka	10th	—	—	—	7th	—	—
(Germany) 2023 Oberhof	21st	19th	10th	18th	5th	6th	—
(Czech Republic) 2024 Nové Město	13th	—	—			—	

*During Olympic seasons competitions are only held for those events not included in the Olympic program.
**The single mixed relay was added as an event in 2019.
