= Biathlon World Championships 2023 – Men's sprint =

Men's sprint at the Biathlon World Championships 2023
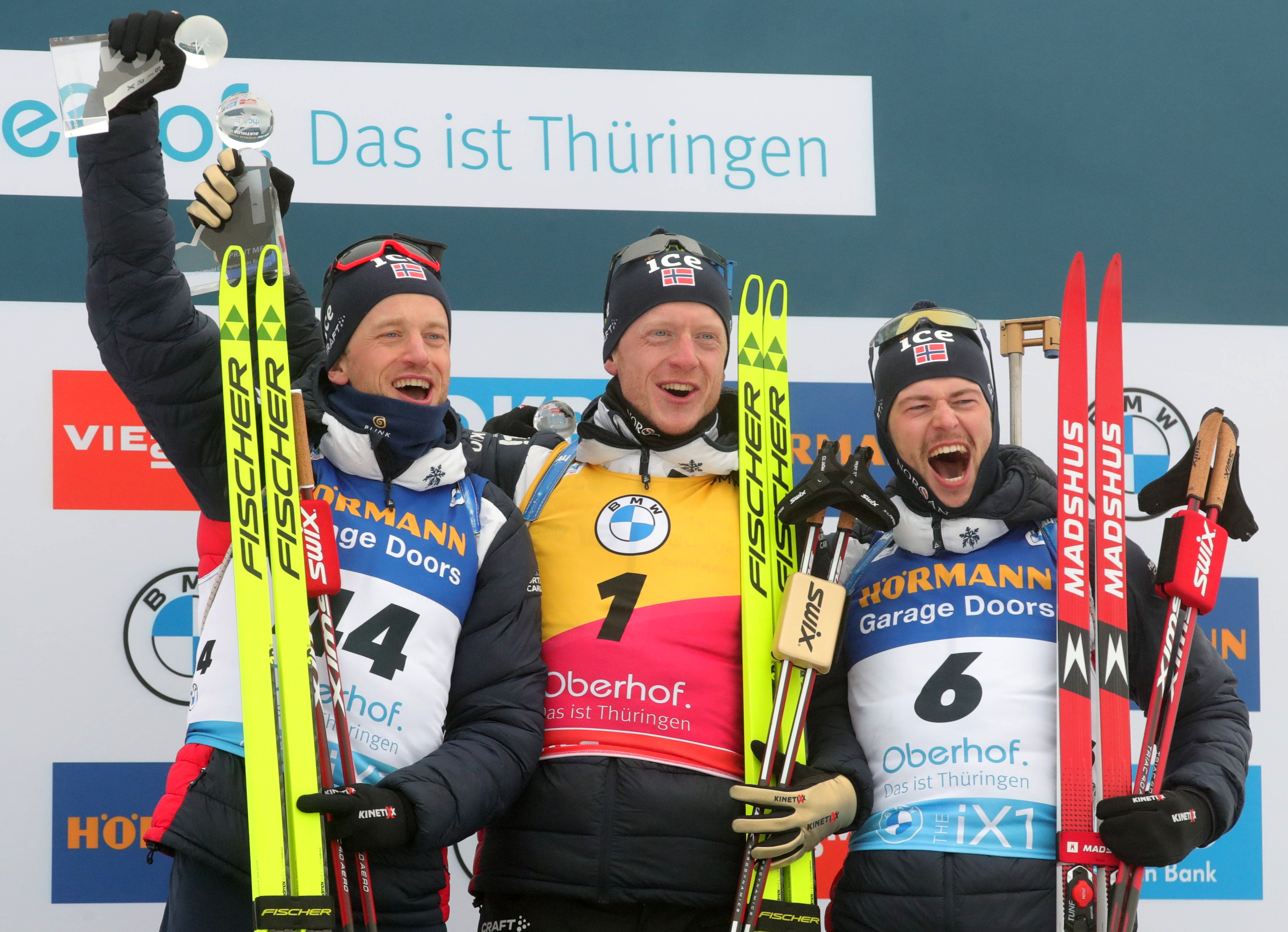
- Location: Oberhof, Germany
- Dates: 11 February
- Competitors: 111 from 35 nations
- Winning time: 23:21.7

Medalists
gold medal	Johannes Thingnes Bø	Norway
silver medal	Tarjei Bø	Norway
bronze medal	Sturla Holm Lægreid	Norway

The men's 10 km sprint competition at the Biathlon World Championships 2023 was held on 11 February 2023.

== Results ==
The race was started at 14:30.

Rank	Bib	Name	Nationality	Penalties (P+S)	Time	Deficit
1st place, gold medalist(s)	1	Johannes Thingnes Bø	Norway	1 (1+0)	23:21.7	—
2nd place, silver medalist(s)	44	Tarjei Bø	Norway	0 (0+0)	23:36.5	+14.8
3rd place, bronze medalist(s)	6	Sturla Holm Lægreid	Norway	1 (0+1)	24:01.6	+39.9
4	70	Johannes Dale	Norway	1 (0+1)	24:05.3	+43.6
5	35	Dmytro Pidruchnyi	Ukraine	0 (0+0)	24:15.1	+53.4
6	33	Vetle Sjåstad Christiansen	Norway	1 (0+1)	24:21.4	+59.7
7	65	Andrejs Rastorgujevs	Latvia	0 (0+0)	24:24.1	+1:02.4
8	54	Johannes Kühn	Germany	1 (0+1)	24:26.5	+1:04.8
9	3	Quentin Fillon Maillet	France	1 (0+1)	24:30.6	+1:08.9
10	67	Antonin Guigonnat	France	0 (0+0)	24:30.7	+1:09.0
11	8	Sebastian Samuelsson	Sweden	2 (0+2)	24:34.8	+1:13.1
12	26	Justus Strelow	Germany	0 (0+0)	24:36.3	+1:14.6
13	36	David Komatz	Austria	1 (1+0)	24:50.8	+1:29.1
14	17	Michal Krčmář	Czech Republic	2 (2+0)	25:05.7	+1:44.0
15	25	Jakub Štvrtecký	Czech Republic	3 (1+2)	25:06.3	+1:44.6
16	12	Fabien Claude	France	1 (1+0)	25:08.6	+1:46.9
17	14	Tommaso Giacomel	Italy	3 (2+1)	25:09.5	+1:47.8
18	24	Martin Ponsiluoma	Sweden	3 (0+3)	25:10.7	+1.49.0
19	19	Roman Rees	Germany	2 (1+1)	25:12.1	+1:50.4
20	18	Vladimir Iliev	Bulgaria	2 (1+1)	25:12.4	+1:50.7
21	5	Anton Dudchenko	Ukraine	1 (0+1)	25:15.4	+1:53.7
22	46	Endre Strømsheim	Norway	3 (2+1)	25:16.9	+1:55.2
23	9	Simon Eder	Austria	0 (0+0)	25:20.4	+1:58.7
24	37	Adam Václavík	Czech Republic	3 (0+3)	25:21:0	+1:59.3
25	21	Niklas Hartweg	Switzerland	2 (1+1)	25:24.5	+2:02.8
26	23	Timofey Lapshin	South Korea	2 (2+0)	25:25.5	+2:03.8
27	47	Peppe Femling	Sweden	1 (0+1)	25:26.7	+2:05.0
28	32	Lukas Hofer	Italy	2 (1+1)	25:26.9	+2:05.2
29	104	Bogdan Tsymbal	Ukraine	1 (1+0)	25:30.1	+2:08.4
30	4	Olli Hiidensalo	Finland	1 (0+1)	25:32.0	+2:10.3
31	41	Paul Schommer	United States	2 (1+1)	25:32.1	+2:10.4
32	7	George Coltea	Romania	1 (0+1)	25:40.4	+2:18.7
33	59	Lovro Planko	Slovenia	1 (1+0)	25:46.3	+2:24.6
34	20	Michal Šíma	Slovakia	1 (1+0)	25:50.9	+2:29.2
35	81	David Zobel	Germany	2 (0+2)	25:51.6	+2:29.9
36	27	Émilien Jacquelin	France	4 (1+3)	25:53.3	+2:31.6
37	15	Sebastian Stalder	Switzerland	1 (1+0)	25:53.6	+2:31.9
38	55	George Buta	Romania	1 (1+0)	25:54.6	+2:32.9
39	69	Jan Guńka	Poland	2 (1+1)	25:54.9	+2:33.2
40	112	Harald Lemmerer	Austria	1 (0+1)	25:55.3	+2:33.6
41	64	Alexandr Mukhin	Kazakhstan	1 (0+1)	25:56.2	+2:34.5
42	22	Vytautas Strolia	Lithuania	2 (1+1)	25:57.6	+2:35.9
43	108	Anton Vidmar	Slovenia	0 (0+0)	25:58.4	+2:36.7
44	90	Artem Pryma	Ukraine	2 (0+2)	25:58.8	+2:37.1
45	10	Jesper Nelin	Sweden	2 (0+2)	26:02.6	+2:40.9
46	29	Campbell Wright	New Zealand	2 (1+1)	26:02.7	+2:41.0
47	62	Tero Seppälä	Finland	4 (0+4)	26:03.6	+2:41.9
48	50	Matija Legović	Croatia	1 (0+1)	26:04.5	+2:42.8
49	73	Éric Perrot	France	3 (1+2)	26:05.5	+2:43.8
50	92	Patrick Braunhofer	Italy	0 (0+0)	26:05.8	+2:44.1
51	103	Raido Ränkel	Estonia	2 (1+1)	26:06.0	+2:44.3
52	96	Jeremy Finello	Switzerland	3 (1+2)	26:07.8	+2:46.1
53	98	Elia Zeni	Italy	1 (0+1)	26:08.3	+2:46.6
54	84	Alex Cisar	Slovenia	2 (1+1)	26:08.9	+2:47.2
55	30	Benedikt Doll	Germany	5 (3+2)	26:09.2	+2:47.5
56	60	Thierry Langer	Belgium	2 (2+0)	26:11.1	+2:49.4
57	2	Pavel Magazeev	Moldova	3 (1+2)	26:12.3	+2:50.6
58	68	Rene Zahkna	Estonia	1 (1+0)	26:16.9	+2:55.2
59	94	Dominic Unterweger	Austria	1 (0+1)	26:18.8	+2:57.1
60	79	Tomáš Mikyska	Czech Republic	3 (2+1)	26:19.6	+2:57.9
61	78	Kristo Siimer	Estonia	2 (1+1)	26:20.0	+2:58.3
62	52	Mikito Tachizaki	Japan	1 (0+1)	26:20.8	+2:59.1
63	11	Jakov Fak	Slovenia	2 (0+2)	26:21.4	+2:59.7
64	111	Oscar Lombardot	France	3 (2+1)	26:21.9	+3:00.2
65	95	Maxime Germain	United States	3 (2+1)	26:22.7	+3:01.0
66	58	Didier Bionaz	Italy	3 (3+0)	26:29.3	+3:07.6
67	34	Florent Claude	Belgium	3 (1+2)	26:29.6	+3:07.9
68	97	Jonáš Mareček	Czech Republic	2 (1+1)	26:35.5	+3:13.8
69	31	Vladislav Kireyev	Kazakhstan	1 (0+1)	26:44.2	+3:22.5
70	83	Tomas Kaukenas	Lithuania	3 (2+1)	26:44.9	+3:23.2
71	105	Heikki Laitinen	Finland	3 (0+3)	26:45.3	+3:23.6
72	99	Joscha Burkhalter	Switzerland	4 (2+2)	26:45.6	+3:23.9
73	45	Kiyomasa Ojima	Japan	2 (1+1)	26:50.5	+3:28.8
74	107	Marcin Zawół	Poland	1 (0+1)	26:51.1	+3:29.4
75	13	Krešimir Crnković	Croatia	3 (1+2)	26:54.2	+3:32.5
76	89	Aleksandrs Patrijuks	Latvia	3 (1+2)	26:58.2	+3:36.5
77	86	Andrzej Nędza-Kubiniec	Poland	1 (1+0)	27:04.4	+3:42.7
78	110	Edgars Mise	Latvia	1 (1+0)	27:06.3	+3:44.6
79	88	Anton Sinapov	Bulgaria	3 (0+3)	27:10.2	+3:48.5
80	28	Sean Doherty	United States	4 (0+4)	27:12.7	+3:51.0
81	38	Serafin Wiestner	Switzerland	6 (3+3)	27:13.5	+3:51.8
82	49	Adam Runnalls	Canada	5 (2+3)	27:19.5	+3:57.8
83	48	Maksim Makarov	Moldova	4 (3+1)	27:23.7	+4:02.0
84	87	Emil Nykvist	Sweden	4 (1+3)	27:24.5	+4:02.8
85	56	Karol Dombrovski	Lithuania	1 (0+1)	27:25.0	+4:03.3
86	106	Trevor Kiers	Canada	3 (1+2)	27:25.2	+4:03.5
87	43	Roberto Piqueras	Spain	1 (0+1)	27:25.4	+4:03.7
88	71	Choi Du-jin	South Korea	2 (0+2)	27:35.0	+4:13.3
89	53	Yan Xingyuan	China	2 (2+0)	27:35.9	+4:14.2
90	74	Mihail Usov	Moldova	4 (3+1)	27:38.8	+4:17.1
91	93	Dmitrii Shamaev	Romania	3 (2+1)	27:39.0	+4:17.3
92	16	Christian Gow	Canada	4 (3+1)	27:57.7	+4:36.0
93	42	Matej Kazár	Slovakia	2 (2+0)	28:00.7	+4:39.0
94	82	Logan Pletz	Canada	4 (2+2)	28:00.9	+4:39.2
95	109	Maksim Fomin	Lithuania	4 (2+2)	28:16.1	+4:54.4
96	72	Sergey Sirik	Kazakhstan	3 (2+1)	28:17.0	+4:55.3
97	77	Cesar Beauvais	Belgium	2 (1+1)	28:17.4	+4:55.7
98	101	Vincent Bonacci	United States	4 (0+4)	28:19.0	+4:57.3
99	63	Apostolos Angelis	Greece	3 (1+2)	28:37.3	+5:15.6
100	80	Zhang Chunyu	China	5 (3+2)	29:38.2	+6:16.5
101	91	Keita Nagaoka	Japan	5 (3+2)	29:43.2	+6:21.5
102	61	Joachim Weel Rosbo	Denmark	6 (2+4)	29:48.1	+6:26.4
103	100	Ryu Yamamoto	Japan	6 (3+3)	29:51.0	+6:29.3
104	51	Marcus Bolin Webb	Great Britain	3 (2+1)	29:53.2	+6:31.5
105	102	Ma Guoqiang	China	5 (2+3)	30:08.9	+6:47.2
106	85	Nikolaos Tsourekas	Greece	5 (4+1)	30:29.9	+7:08.2
107	40	Zana Öztunç	Turkey	6 (3+3)	30:49.8	+7:28.1
108	39	Dávid Panyik	Hungary	2 (1+1)	31:05.7	+7:44.0
109	75	Ádám Büki	Hungary	6 (4+2)	31:29.1	+8:07.4
110	57	Aleksa Vuković	Bosnia and Herzegovina	8 (5+3)	33:14.9	+9:53.2
111	76	Tuomas Harjula	Finland	9 (5+4)	40:26.5	+17:04.8
	66	Blagoy Todev	Bulgaria	Did not start		
