= Biathlon World Championships 2023 – Men's individual =

Men's individual at the Biathlon World Championships 2023
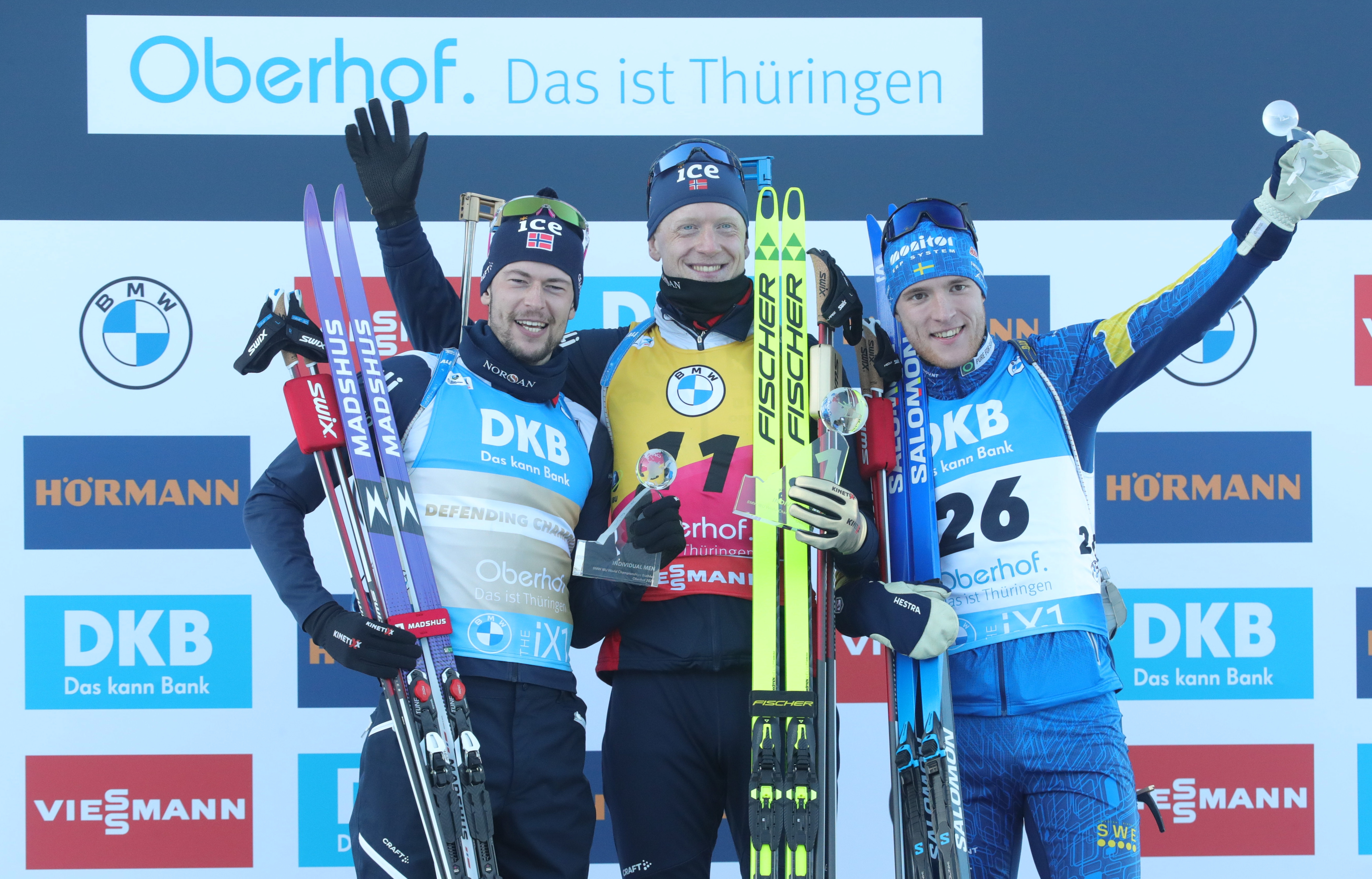
- Location: Oberhof, Germany
- Dates: 14 February
- Competitors: 104 from 33 nations
- Winning time: 49:57.5

Medalists
gold medal	Johannes Thingnes Bø	Norway
silver medal	Sturla Holm Lægreid	Norway
bronze medal	Sebastian Samuelsson	Sweden

The men's 20 km individual competition at the Biathlon World Championships 2023 was held on 14 February 2023.

== Results ==
The race was started at 14:30.

Rank	Bib	Name	Nationality	Penalties (P+S+P+S)	Time	Deficit
1st place, gold medalist(s)	11	Johannes Thingnes Bø	Norway	2 (0+1+1+0)	49:57.5	
2nd place, silver medalist(s)	21	Sturla Holm Lægreid	Norway	1 (0+0+0+1)	51:08.2	+1:10.7
3rd place, bronze medalist(s)	26	Sebastian Samuelsson	Sweden	1 (0+0+1+0)	51:08.6	+1:11.1
4	6	Quentin Fillon Maillet	France	1 (0+0+0+1)	51:29.4	+1:31.9
5	28	Benedikt Doll	Germany	1 (1+0+0+0)	52:07.1	+2:09.6
6	17	Niklas Hartweg	Switzerland	1 (1+0+0+0)	52:29.3	+2:31.8
7	55	Tarjei Bø	Norway	2 (1+0+0+1)	52:30.4	+2:32.9
8	23	Michal Krčmář	Czech Republic	1 (0+1+0+0)	52:46.7	+2:49.2
9	78	Philipp Nawrath	Germany	2 (0+0+2+0)	53:17.7	+3:20.2
10	32	Vetle Sjåstad Christiansen	Norway	2 (0+1+0+1)	53:27.0	+3:29.5
11	15	Martin Ponsiluoma	Sweden	4 (0+1+2+1)	53:39.8	+3:42.3
12	57	Artem Tyshchenko	Ukraine	0 (0+0+0+0)	54:00.0	+4:02.5
13	9	Justus Strelow	Germany	1 (0+0+0+1)	54:11.7	+4:14.2
14	59	Tomáš Mikyska	Czech Republic	2 (0+1+0+1)	54:12.0	+4:14.5
15	47	Endre Strømsheim	Norway	3 (1+2+0+0)	54:14.3	+4:16.8
16	4	Sebastian Stalder	Switzerland	1 (0+1+0+0)	54:16.7	+4:19.2
17	13	Tommaso Giacomel	Italy	3 (1+0+2+0)	54:17.3	+4:19.8
18	50	Tero Seppälä	Finland	3 (1+0+0+2)	54:26.6	+4:29.1
19	86	Alex Cisar	Slovenia	1 (0+0+0+1)	54:38.3	+4:40.8
20	3	Campbell Wright	New Zealand	2 (0+1+0+1)	54:38.4	+4:40.9
21	2	Roman Rees	Germany	2 (0+1+0+1)	54:40.5	+4:43.0
22	10	Jesper Nelin	Sweden	2 (0+0+0+2)	54:41.9	+4:44.4
23	22	George Buta	Romania	2 (2+0+0+0)	55:03.7	+5:06.2
24	65	David Komatz	Austria	2 (0+0+2+0)	55:10.0	+5:12.5
25	75	Dmitrii Shamaev	Romania	1 (1+0+0+0)	55:12.3	+5:14.8
26	35	Didier Bionaz	Italy	1 (0+1+0+0)	55:13.7	+5:16.2
27	106	Florent Claude	Belgium	1 (0+0+0+1)	55:18.9	+5:21.4
28	24	Vladimir Iliev	Bulgaria	3 (1+1+1+0)	55:23.4	+5:25.9
29	46	Anton Sinapov	Bulgaria	0 (0+0+0+0)	55:40.1	+5:42.6
30	12	Adam Runnalls	Canada	2 (0+1+1+0)	55:40.4	+5:42.9
31	29	Olli Hiidensalo	Finland	3 (0+1+0+2)	55:46.7	+5:49.2
32	95	Éric Perrot	France	2 (1+0+0+1)	55:50.5	+5:53.0
33	30	Anton Vidmar	Slovenia	3 (1+1+1+0)	55:53.7	+5:56.2
34	58	Tomas Kaukėnas	Lithuania	2 (0+0+0+2)	56:00.6	+6:03.1
35	39	Sean Doherty	United States	3 (0+2+0+1)	56:02.9	+6:05.4
36	93	Joscha Burkhalter	Switzerland	3 (1+1+1+0)	56:18.1	+6:20.6
37	8	Fabien Claude	France	4 (0+2+1+1)	56:21.5	+6:24.0
37	19	Émilien Jacquelin	France	3 (0+2+1+0)	56:21.5	+6:24.0
39	81	Bogdan Tsymbal	Ukraine	2 (2+0+0+0)	56:33.9	+6:36.4
40	100	Denys Nasyko	Ukraine	2 (1+0+0+1)	56:34.5	+6:37.0
41	88	Tuomas Harjula	Finland	2 (0+1+0+1)	56:39.5	+6:42.0
42	5	Anton Dudchenko	Ukraine	3 (0+0+1+2)	56:45.8	+6:48.3
43	105	Andrzej Nędza-Kubiniec	Poland	1 (0+1+0+0)	56:56.1	+6:58.6
44	34	Vytautas Strolia	Lithuania	3 (1+0+1+1)	57:00.3	+7:02.8
45	37	Jeremy Finello	Switzerland	7 (1+3+0+3)	57:01.3	+7:03.8
46	103	Miha Dovžan	Slovenia	4 (1+1+1+1)	57:04.0	+7:06.5
47	63	Johannes Dale	Norway	5 (2+1+1+1)	57:05.3	+7:07.8
48	98	Elia Zeni	Italy	2 (1+0+1+0)	57:07.6	+7:10.1
49	71	Emil Nykvist	Sweden	4 (0+1+0+3)	57:10.1	+7:12.6
50	83	Marcin Zawół	Poland	3 (0+1+1+1)	57:25.2	+7:27.7
51	7	Pavel Magazeev	Moldova	4 (1+1+2+0)	57:29.5	+7:32.0
52	101	Jaakko Ranta	Finland	3 (1+1+1+0)	57:35.9	+7:38.4
53	84	Serafin Wiestner	Switzerland	5 (2+1+1+1)	57:36.5	+7:39.0
54	25	Thierry Langer	Belgium	3 (2+1+0+0)	57:40.0	+7:42.5
55	53	Lovro Planko	Slovenia	4 (0+2+1+1)	57:47.2	+7:49.7
56	18	Andrejs Rastorgujevs	Latvia	6 (2+0+0+4)	57:56.1	+7:58.6
57	87	Kristo Siimer	Estonia	5 (1+2+0+2)	57:58.2	+8:00.7
58	48	Antonin Guigonnat	France	6 (1+2+1+2)	58:06.1	+8:08.6
59	52	Maksim Makarov	Moldova	2 (0+0+1+1)	58:07.1	+8:09.6
60	69	Dominic Unterweger	Austria	4 (1+0+2+1)	58:11.7	+8:14.2
61	51	Alexandr Mukhin	Kazakhstan	5 (1+0+1+3)	58:14.2	+8:16.7
62	44	Mikito Tachizaki	Japan	2 (0+0+1+1)	58:17.6	+8:20.1
63	45	Raul Flore	Romania	3 (0+2+1+0)	58:20.2	+8:22.7
64	96	Logan Pletz	Canada	2 (0+0+2+0)	58:22.1	+8:24.6
65	1	Jakub Štvrtecký	Czech Republic	4 (1+1+0+2)	58:27.2	+8:29.7
66	33	Timofey Lapshin	South Korea	3 (2+0+1+0)	58:29.5	+8:32.0
67	62	Choi Du-jin	South Korea	1 (0+0+1+0)	58:40.8	+8:43.3
68	14	Vladislav Kireyev	Kazakhstan	4 (1+0+1+2)	58:41.4	+8:43.9
69	38	Edgars Mise	Latvia	2 (0+0+1+1)	58:44.1	+8:46.6
70	90	Oscar Lombardot	France	4 (2+1+1+0)	58:46.7	+8:49.2
71	31	Michal Šíma	Slovakia	3 (1+1+0+1)	58:53.9	+8:56.4
72	20	Lukas Hofer	Italy	4 (0+1+1+2)	58:56.6	+8:59.1
73	42	David Zobel	Germany	3 (0+1+0+2)	58:57.6	+9:00.1
74	85	Alexandrs Patrijuks	Latvia	4 (0+2+2+0)	59:03.3	+9:05.8
75	104	Krešimir Crnković	Croatia	5 (1+3+0+1)	59:28.8	+9:31.3
76	97	Jonáš Mareček	Czech Republic	4 (1+1+2+0)	59:47.3	+9:49.8
77	16	Paul Schommer	United States	6 (2+0+2+2)	59:48.3	+9:50.8
78	79	Asset Dyussenov	Kazakhstan	6 (1+2+2+1)	59:51.1	+9:53.6
79	61	Peppe Femling	Sweden	7 (2+2+1+2)	59:51.9	+9:54.4
80	94	Vincent Bonacci	United States	3 (0+1+1+1)	59:57.4	+9:59.9
81	70	Adam Václavík	Czech Republic	8 (0+4+2+2)	59:59.1	+10:01.6
82	92	Harald Lemmerer	Austria	5 (1+3+0+1)	1:00:19.2	+10:21.7
83	102	Ma Guoqiang	China	3 (0+0+0+3)	1:00:31.6	+10:34.1
84	54	Yan Xingyuan	China	4 (1+0+3+0)	1:00:43.3	+10:45.8
85	99	Robert Heldna	Estonia	4 (1+2+0+1)	1:01:00.9	+11:03.4
86	74	Trevor Kiers	Canada	6 (1+1+0+4)	1:01:16.3	+11:18.8
87	60	Jan Guńka	Poland	7 (1+1+3+2)	1:01:16.6	+11:19.1
88	89	Mihail Usov	Moldova	4 (0+2+1+1)	1:01:21.6	+11:24.1
89	68	Christian Gow	Canada	6 (1+1+2+2)	1:01:22.5	+11:25.0
90	43	Rene Zahkna	Estonia	6 (1+2+3+0)	1:01:39.6	+11:42.1
91	76	Zhang Chunyu	China	4 (1+1+1+1)	1:01:53.6	+11:56.1
92	107	Ryu Yamamoto	Japan	5 (0+1+2+2)	1:02:06.4	+12:08.9
93	41	Roberto Piqueras	Spain	3 (0+1+0+2)	1:02:12.0	+12:14.5
94	82	Maxime Germain	United States	7 (2+2+1+2)	1:02:34.2	+12:36.7
95	64	Matej Kazár	Slovakia	4 (1+2+1+0)	1:02:41.3	+12:43.8
96	91	Cesar Beauvais	Belgium	6 (2+1+1+2)	1:03:31.2	+13:33.7
97	36	Zana Öztunç	Turkey	3 (1+1+1+0)	1:03:48.2	+13:50.7
98	77	Maksim Fomin	Lithuania	11 (4+3+3+1)	1:05:15.5	+15:18.0
99	40	Kiyomasa Ojima	Japan	8 (1+3+3+1)	1:05:33.9	+15:36.4
100	80	Keita Nagaoka	Japan	5 (0+1+2+2)	1:05:40.9	+15:43.4
101	72	Nikolaos Tsourekas	Greece	5 (0+3+1+1)	1:06:15.4	+16:17.9
102	67	Joachim Weel Rosbo	Denmark	10 (2+3+2+3)	1:08:15.1	+18:17.6
103	49	Aleksa Vuković	Bosnia and Herzegovina	9 (1+2+4+2)	1:12:18.4	+22:20.9
	56	Apostolos Angelis	Greece	(3+2+ + )	Did not finish	
	27	Simon Eder	Austria	Did not start		
	66	Marcus Bolin Webb	Great Britain	Did not start		
	73	Patrick Braunhofer	Italy	Did not start		
	108	Karol Dombrovski	Lithuania	Did not start		
