= Biathlon World Championships 2024 – Men's sprint =

Men's sprint at the Biathlon World Championships 2024
- Venue: Vysočina Arena
- Location: Nové Město na Moravě, Czech Republic
- Dates: 10 February
- Competitors: 99 from 31 nations
- Winning time: 25:23.9

Medalists
gold medal	Sturla Holm Lægreid	Norway
silver medal	Johannes Thingnes Bø	Norway
bronze medal	Vetle Sjåstad Christiansen	Norway

The Men's sprint competition at the Biathlon World Championships 2024 was held on 10 February 2024.

Johannes Thingnes Bø was the defending champion but he did not defend her title, finishing the competition in 2nd place.

Sturla Holm Lægreid from Norway became the new world champion after winning his third individual gold medal. The bronze was won by Vetle Sjåstad Christiansen from Norway. For the second time in a row at the world championships in sprint, competitors from Norway took all the podium places.

== Results ==
The race was started at 17:05.

Rank	Bib	Name	Nationality	Penalties (P+S)	Time	Deficit
1st place, gold medalist(s)	50	Sturla Holm Lægreid	Norway	0 (0+0)	25:23.9	
2nd place, silver medalist(s)	26	Johannes Thingnes Bø	Norway	1 (1+0)	25:27.4	+3.5
3rd place, bronze medalist(s)	48	Vetle Sjåstad Christiansen	Norway	1 (1+0)	25:42.5	+18.6
4	42	Éric Perrot	France	1 (0+1)	25:52.8	+28.9
5	28	Sebastian Samuelsson	Sweden	0 (0+0)	26:00.5	+36.6
6	14	Tarjei Bø	Norway	2 (1+1)	26:01.4	+37.5
7	11	Johannes Dale-Skjevdal	Norway	2 (1+1)	26:02.1	+38.2
8	9	Quentin Fillon Maillet	France	1 (0+1)	26:04.6	+40.7
9	21	Émilien Jacquelin	France	1 (1+0)	26:19.3	+55.4
10	19	Martin Ponsiluoma	Sweden	2 (2+0)	26:27.2	+1:03.3
11	18	Campbell Wright	United States	0 (0+0)	26:31.8	+1:07.9
12	16	Andrejs Rastorgujevs	Latvia	0 (0+0)	26:40.8	+1:16.9
13	7	Benedikt Doll	Germany	2 (2+0)	27:05.1	+1:41.2
14	4	Johannes Kühn	Germany	1 (0+1)	27:05.8	+1:41.9
15	2	Tommaso Giacomel	Italy	1 (1+0)	27:07.3	+1:43.4
16	30	Philipp Nawrath	Germany	1 (1+0)	27:08.7	+1:44.8
17	12	Adam Runnalls	Canada	0 (0+0)	27:11.2	+1:47.3
18	33	Lukas Hofer	Italy	0 (0+0)	27:11.9	+1:48.0
19	27	Michal Krčmář	Czech Republic	1 (0+1)	27:16.5	+1:52.6
20	58	Endre Strømsheim	Norway	2 (1+1)	27:17.7	+1:53.8
21	1	Dmytro Pidruchnyi	Ukraine	1 (1+0)	27:28.9	+2:05.0
22	29	Niklas Hartweg	Switzerland	1 (1+0)	27:30.2	+2:06.3
23	8	Jesper Nelin	Sweden	1 (0+1)	27:32.2	+2:08.3
24	43	Viktor Brandt	Sweden	0 (0+0)	27:33.0	+2:09.1
25	55	Philipp Horn	Germany	2 (1+1)	27:35.4	+2:11.5
26	83	Fabien Claude	France	3 (1+2)	27:37.4	+2:13.8
27	15	Jakov Fak	Slovenia	1 (0+1)	27:42.8	+2:18.9
28	31	Didier Bionaz	Italy	2 (1+1)	27:44.0	+2:20.1
29	52	David Komatz	Austria	1 (0+1)	27:48.8	+2:24.9
30	22	Timofey Lapshin	South Korea	1 (0+1)	27:51.2	+2:27.3
31	88	Tero Seppälä	Finland	3 (1+2)	27:53.3	+2:29.4
32	20	Florent Claude	Belgium	2 (1+1)	27:53.5	+2:29.6
33	93	Tomáš Mikyska	Czech Republic	1 (0+1)	27:55.4	+2:31.5
34	39	Lovro Planko	Slovenia	2 (1+1)	28:12.4	+2:48.5
35	10	Alexandr Mukhin	Kazakhstan	2 (1+1)	28:14.8	+2:50.9
36	25	Rene Zahkna	Estonia	2 (1+1)	28:16.7	+2:52.8
37	23	Pavel Magazeev	Moldova	2 (1+1)	28:20.1	+2:56.2
38	68	Jake Brown	United States	3 (1+2)	28:20.9	+2:57.9
39	81	Anton Dudchenko	Ukraine	0 (0+0)	28:23.7	+2:59.8
40	78	Konrad Badacz	Poland	1 (0+1)	28:25.1	+3:01.2
41	54	Jakub Štvrtecký	Czech Republic	3 (2+1)	28:28.0	+3:04.1
42	63	Maksim Makarov	Moldova	0 (0+0)	28:30.6	+3:06.7
43	56	Tomas Kaukėnas	Lithuania	0 (0+0)	28:32.0	+3:08.1
44	32	Sean Doherty	United States	3 (1+2)	28:34.0	+3:10.1
45	38	Vladislav Kireyev	Kazakhstan	2 (1+1)	28:35.0	+3:11.1
46	73	Jeremy Finello	Switzerland	3 (1+2)	28:41.0	+3:17.1
47	86	Anton Vidmar	Slovenia	2 (0+2)	28:41.6	+3:17.7
48	45	George Colțea	Romania	1 (1+0)	28:45.8	+3:21.9
49	66	Felix Leitner	Austria	1 (0+1)	28:47.7	+3:23.8
50	24	Sebastian Stalder	Switzerland	1 (0+1)	28:48.9	+3:25.0
51	84	Raido Ränkel	Estonia	4 (1+3)	28:50.5	+3:26.6
52	76	Patrick Braunhofer	Italy	1 (1+0)	28:52.2	+3:28.3
53	91	Patrick Jakob	Austria	2 (0+2)	28:52.7	+3:28.8
54	3	Otto Invenius	Finland	4 (2+2)	28:53.8	+3:29.9
55	40	Heikki Laitinen	Finland	2 (2+0)	28:54.4	+3:30.5
56	13	Vytautas Strolia	Lithuania	2 (1+1)	28:55.4	+3:31.5
57	61	Joscha Burkhalter	Switzerland	3 (1+2)	28:56.9	+3:33.0
58	70	Jonáš Mareček	Czech Republic	3 (2+1)	28:59.1	+3:35.2
59	17	Dmitrii Shamaev	Romania	0 (0+0)	28:59.9	+3:36.0
60	62	Artem Pryma	Ukraine	3 (1+2)	29:01.3	+3:37.4
61	95	Olli Hiidensalo	Finland	2 (1+1)	29:03.0	+3:39.1
62	5	Simon Eder	Austria	2 (0+2)	29:03.4	+3:39.5
63	96	Maxime Germain	United States	4 (2+2)	29:05.6	+3:41.7
64	41	Kristo Siimer	Estonia	4 (2+2)	29:06.9	+3:43.0
65	98	Miha Dovžan	Slovenia	1 (0+1)	29:10.9	+3:47.0
66	47	Mikito Tachizaki	Japan	0 (0+0)	29:14.6	+3:50.7
67	89	Taras Lesiuk	Ukraine	3 (1+2)	29:17.3	+3:53.4
68	72	Asset Dyussenov	Kazakhstan	3 (1+2)	29:22.3	+3:58.4
69	92	Andrzej Nędza-Kubiniec	Poland	2 (0+2)	29:25.5	+4:01.6
70	44	Renārs Birkentāls	Latvia	3 (2+1)	29:27.1	+4:03.2
71	100	George Buta	Romania	1 (1+0)	29:40.0	+4:16.1
72	53	Tomáš Sklenárik	Slovakia	3 (2+1)	29:47.2	+4:23.3
73	64	Jan Guńka	Poland	3 (1+2)	29:48.1	+4:24.2
74	82	Blagoy Todev	Bulgaria	3 (0+3)	29:55.9	+4:32.0
75	69	Alexandr Starodubets	South Korea	2 (1+1)	29:56.5	+4:32.6
76	35	Anton Sinapov	Bulgaria	2(0+2)	30:05.9	+4:42.0
77	77	Edgars Mise	Latvia	2 (0+2)	30:06.4	+4:42.5
78	34	Christian Gow	Canada	3 (2+1)	30:10.8	+4:46.9
79	75	Maksim Fomin	Lithuania	3 (1+2)	30:12.0	+4:48.1
80	65	Marek Mackels	Belgium	2 (0+2)	30:19.5	+4:55.6
81	46	Krešimir Crnković	Croatia	5 (2+3)	30:20.7	+4:56.8
82	99	Jokūbas Mackinė	Lithuania	1 (1+0)	30:32.2	+5:08.3
83	71	Cornel Puchianu	Romania	3 (1+2)	30:43.1	+5:19.2
84	67	Mihail Usov	Moldova	2 (1+1)	30:44.4	+5:20.5
85	80	Rasmus Schiellerup	Denmark	2 (0+2)	30:50.9	+5:27.0
86	85	Logan Pletz	Canada	2 (0+2)	30:52.4	+5:28.5
87	79	Damián Cesnek	Slovakia	3 (0+3)	31:12.2	+5:48.3
88	94	Masaharu Yamamoto	Japan	4 (0+4)	31:13.2	+5:49.3
89	49	Roberto Piqueras	Spain	3 (2+1)	31:15.5	+5:51.6
90	37	Choi Du-jin	South Korea	2 (1+1)	31:17.0	+5:53.1
91	59	Noah Bradford	Australia	2 (0+2)	31:25.6	+6:01.7
92	90	Matej Badan	Slovakia	4 (0+4)	31:30.1	+6:06.2
93	51	Marcus Webb	Great Britain	2 (1+1)	31:43.6	+6:19.7
94	97	Haldan Borglum	Canada	3 (1+2)	31:44.1	+6:20.2
95	87	Kiyomasa Ojima	Japan	4 (2+2)	31:46.6	+6:22.7
96	74	Nikolaos Tsourekas	Greece	3 (2+1)	31:48.0	+6:24.1
97	60	Apostolos Angelis	Greece	5 (3+2)	31:49.6	+6:25.7
98	57	Jacob Weel Rosbo	Denmark	5 (3+2)	31:55.1	+6:31.2
–	36	Thierry Langer	Belgium	Did not finish		
–	6	Vladimir Iliev	Bulgaria	Did not start		
