= Biathlon World Championships 2024 – Men's pursuit =

Men's pursuit at the Biathlon World Championships 2024
- Venue: Vysočina Arena
- Location: Nové Město na Moravě, Czech Republic
- Dates: 11 February
- Competitors: 55 from 21 nations
- Winning time: 32:36.9

Medalists
gold medal	Johannes Thingnes Bø	Norway
silver medal	Sturla Holm Lægreid	Norway
bronze medal	Vetle Sjåstad Christiansen	Norway

The Men's pursuit competition at the Biathlon World Championships 2024 was held on 11 February 2024.

Johannes Thingnes Bø was the defending champion and successfully defended his title. The sprint's world champion Sturla Holm Lægreid also defended his silver medal and Vetle Sjåstad Christiansen won his second bronze medal at this world championships.

For the first time in the history of the pursuit race at the world championships, the Norwegians took all the places on the podium.

== Results ==
The race was started at 17:05.

Rank	Bib	Name	Nationality	Start	Penalties (P+P+S+S)	Time	Deficit
1st place, gold medalist(s)	2	Johannes Thingnes Bø	Norway	0:04	3 (1+2+0+0)	32:36.9	
2nd place, silver medalist(s)	1	Sturla Holm Lægreid	Norway	0:00	2 (2+0+0+0)	33:05.6	+28.7
3rd place, bronze medalist(s)	3	Vetle Sjåstad Christiansen	Norway	0:19	3 (0+0+1+2)	33:15.4	+38.5
4	6	Tarjei Bø	Norway	0:38	4 (0+0+0+4)	33:30.9	+54.0
5	7	Johannes Dale-Skjevdal	Norway	0:38	3 (0+0+3+0)	33:57.8	+1:20.9
6	5	Sebastian Samuelsson	Sweden	0:37	3 (0+0+2+1)	34:05.2	+1:28.3
7	10	Martin Ponsiluoma	Sweden	1:03	4 (1+1+1+1)	34:13.7	+1:36.8
8	20	Endre Strømsheim	Norway	1:54	1 (0+0+1+0)	34:19.3	+1:42.4
9	18	Lukas Hofer	Italy	1:48	0 (0+0+0+0)	34:24.8	+1:47.9
10	26	Fabien Claude	France	2:14	0 (0+0+0+0)	34:31.9	+1:55.0
11	8	Quentin Fillon Maillet	France	0:41	6 (2+2+2+0)	34:48.3	+2:11.4
12	11	Campbell Wright	United States	1:08	2 (1+1+0+0)	34:58.4	+2:21.5
13	9	Émilien Jacquelin	France	0:55	6 (3+2+1+0)	35:10.8	+2:33.9
14	4	Éric Perrot	France	0:29	6 (0+0+2+4)	35:39.4	+3:02.5
15	14	Johannes Kühn	Germany	1:42	4 (0+1+1+2)	35:45.5	+3:08.6
16	13	Benedikt Doll	Germany	1:41	4 (1+0+2+1)	35:52.7	+3:15.8
17	25	Philipp Horn	Germany	2:12	3 (0+1+0+2)	35:56.3	+3:19.4
18	19	Michal Krčmář	Czech Republic	1:53	3 (0+1+0+2)	35:57.8	+3:20.9
19	12	Andrejs Rastorgujevs	Latvia	1:17	6 (2+0+1+3)	35:59.1	+3:22.2
20	15	Tommaso Giacomel	Italy	1:43	6 (2+1+2+1)	36:03.9	+3:27.0
21	16	Philipp Nawrath	Germany	1:45	5 (0+2+2+1)	36:09.3	+3:32.4
22	22	Niklas Hartweg	Switzerland	2:06	2 (1+1+0+0)	36:25.6	+3:48.7
23	21	Dmytro Pidruchnyi	Ukraine	2:05	3 (0+1+0+2)	36:39.0	+4:02.1
24	27	Jakov Fak	Slovenia	2:19	3 (0+0+1+2)	36:41.3	+4:04.4
25	39	Anton Dudchenko	Ukraine	3:00	0 (0+0+0+0)	36:46.6	+4:09.7
26	44	Sean Doherty	United States	3:10	1 (0+0+1+0)	36:58.2	+4:21.3
27	33	Tomáš Mikyska	Czech Republic	2:32	3 (1+1+0+1)	37:03.5	+4:26.6
28	35	Alexandr Mukhin	Kazakhstan	2:51	2 (1+0+1+0)	37:03.7	+4:26.8
29	32	Florent Claude	Belgium	2:30	4 (1+0+1+2)	37:04.3	+4:27.4
30	29	David Komatz	Austria	2:25	3 (1+1+0+1)	37:06.4	+4:29.5
31	40	Konrad Badacz	Poland	3:01	2 (0+0+2+0)	37:14.3	+4:37.4
32	28	Didier Bionaz	Italy	2:20	3 (2+2+0+2)	37:20.4	+4:43.5
33	24	Viktor Brandt	Sweden	2:09	4 (0+0+2+2)	37:24.6	+4:47.7
34	54	Otto Invenius	Finland	3:30	2 (1+0+1+0)	37:27.0	+4:50.1
35	30	Timofei Lapshin	South Korea	2:27	5 (2+1+2+0)	37:32.5	+4:55.6
36	37	Pavel Magazeev	Moldova	2:56	2 (1+0+1+0)	37:33.0	+4:56.1
37	38	Jake Brown	United States	2:57	4 (1+0+2+1)	37:53.6	+5:16.7
38	34	Lovro Planko	Slovenia	2:49	3 (0+1+1+1)	38:13.1	+5:36.2
39	49	Felix Leitner	Austria	3:24	2 (0+0+1+1)	38:32.9	+5:56.0
40	36	Rene Zahkna	Estonia	2:53	6 (0+2+2+2)	38:43.9	+6:07.0
41	23	Jesper Nelin	Sweden	2:08	6 (1+1+2+2)	38:50.7	+6:13.8
42	50	Sebastian Stalder	Switzerland	3:25	5 (1+1+2+1)	38:52.3	+6:15.4
43	53	Patrick Jakob	Austria	3:29	3 (0+1+1+1)	38:53.7	+6:16.8
44	57	Joscha Burkhalter	Switzerland	3:33	4 (1+2+1+0)	38:54.5	+6:17.6
45	42	Maksim Makarov	Moldova	3:07	4 (1+1+1+1)	39:06.7	+6:29.8
46	47	Anton Vidmar	Slovenia	3:18	5 (1+2+1+1)	39:13.9	+6:37.0
47	41	Jakub Štvrtecký	Czech Republic	3:04	8 (3+2+3+0)	39:19.0	+6:41.2
48	52	Patrick Braunhofer	Italy	3:28	4 (0+0+4+0)	39:19.1	+6:42.2
49	31	Tero Seppälä	Finland	2:29	8 (2+2+3+1)	39:29.3	+6:52.4
50	17	Adam Runnalls	Canada	1:47	10 (2+2+3+3)	39:46.3	+7:09.4
51	55	Heikki Laitinen	Finland	3:31	5 (1+3+0+1)	40:25.5	+7:48.6
52	45	Vladislav Kireyev	Kazakhstan	3:11	8 (1+3+2+2)	40:48.3	+8:11.4
53	51	Raido Ränkel	Estonia	3:27	10 (0+3+4+3)	40:57.3	+8:20.4
–	43	Tomas Kaukėnas	Lithuania	3:08	(1+1+2+)	Lapped	
–	46	Jeremy Finello	Switzerland	3:17	(2+4+)	Did not finish	
–	48	George Colțea	Romania	3:22	Did not start		
–	56	Vytautas Strolia	Lithuania	3:32	Did not start		
–	58	Jonáš Mareček	Czech Republic	3:35	Did not start		
–	59	Dmitrii Shamaev	Romania	3:36	Did not start		
–	60	Artem Pryma	Ukraine	3:37	Did not start		
