= Biathlon World Championships 2023 – Men's pursuit =

Men's pursuit at the Biathlon World Championships 2023
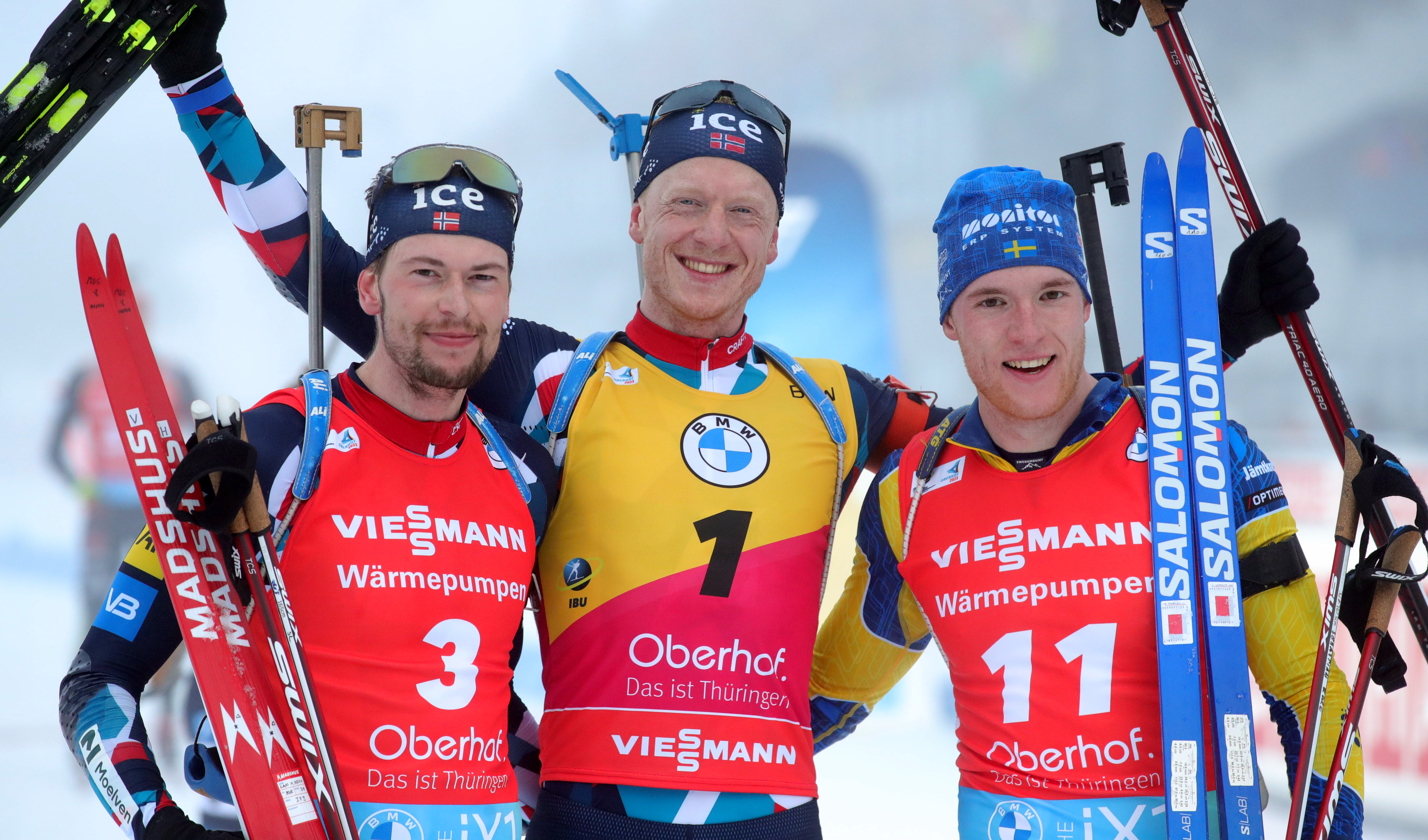
- Location: Oberhof, Germany
- Dates: 12 February
- Competitors: 56 from 24 nations
- Winning time: 33:34.5

Medalists
gold medal	Johannes Thingnes Bø	Norway
silver medal	Sturla Holm Lægreid	Norway
bronze medal	Sebastian Samuelsson	Sweden

The men's 12.5 km pursuit competition at the Biathlon World Championships 2023 was held on 12 February 2023.

== Results ==
The race was started at 15:30.

Rank	Bib	Name	Nationality	Start	Penalties (P+P+S+S)	Time	Deficit
1st place, gold medalist(s)	1	Johannes Thingnes Bø	Norway	0:00	0 (0+0+0+0)	33:34.5	
2nd place, silver medalist(s)	3	Sturla Holm Lægreid	Norway	0:40	0 (0+0+0+0)	34:45.7	+1:11.2
3rd place, bronze medalist(s)	11	Sebastian Samuelsson	Sweden	1:13	2 (0+0+0+2)	35:28.6	+1:54.1
4	2	Tarjei Bø	Norway	0:15	4 (0+0+2+2)	35:31.8	+1:57.3
5	6	Vetle Sjåstad Christiansen	Norway	1:00	2 (0+0+0+2)	35:49.2	+2:14.7
6	8	Johannes Kühn	Germany	1:05	3 (0+0+1+2)	36:01.6	+2:27.1
7	4	Johannes Dale	Norway	0:44	5 (0+1+1+3)	36:22.7	+2:48.2
8	5	Dmytro Pidruchnyi	Ukraine	0:53	2 (0+0+2+0)	36:26.5	+2:52.0
9	7	Andrejs Rastorgujevs	Latvia	1:02	2 (1+0+1+0)	36:31.4	+2:56.9
10	19	Roman Rees	Germany	1:50	2 (1+0+1+0)	36:39.0	+3:04.5
11	12	Justus Strelow	Germany	1:15	1 (0+0+0+1)	36:45.0	+3:10.5
12	9	Quentin Fillon Maillet	France	1:09	7 (3+2+0+2)	36:52.5	+3:18.0
13	22	Endre Strømsheim	Norway	1:55	5 (2+1+2+0)	36:53.0	+3:18.5
14	10	Antonin Guigonnat	France	1:09	5 (0+2+2+1)	36:55.5	+3:21.0
15	55	Benedikt Doll	Germany	2:48	2 (0+1+0+1)	36:58.3	+3:23.8
16	20	Vladimir Iliev	Bulgaria	1:51	3 (0+1+0+2)	37:06.1	+3:31.6
17	25	Niklas Hartweg	Switzerland	2:03	1 (0+0+0+1)	37:09.9	+3:35.4
18	18	Martin Ponsiluoma	Sweden	1:49	6 (1+1+1+3)	37:25.0	+3:50.5
19	14	Michal Krčmář	Czech Republic	1:44	4 (0+2+2+0)	37:32.0	+3:57.5
20	21	Anton Dudchenko	Ukraine	1:54	2 (0+0+1+1)	37:33.7	+3:59.2
21	16	Fabien Claude	France	1:47	6 (1+2+1+2)	37:39.9	+4:05.4
22	15	Jakub Štvrtecký	Czech Republic	1:45	4 (1+1+0+2)	37:41.7	+4:07.2
23	45	Jesper Nelin	Sweden	2:41	1 (0+0+0+1)	37:43.6	+4:09.1
24	47	Tero Seppälä	Finland	2:42	4 (1+1+1+1)	37:45.6	+4:11.1
25	27	Peppe Femling	Sweden	2:05	3 (1+1+0+1)	37:49.0	+4:14.5
26	43	Anton Vidmar	Slovenia	2:37	1 (1+0+0+0)	37:55.1	+4:20.6
27	13	David Komatz	Austria	1:29	1 (1+0+0+0)	38:02.4	+4:27.9
28	52	Jeremy Finello	Switzerland	2:46	6 (1+0+5+0)	38:08.6	+4:34.1
29	33	Lovro Planko	Slovenia	2:25	2 (1+0+1+0)	38:18.3	+4:43.8
30	54	Alex Cisar	Slovenia	2:47	1 (0+0+0+1)	38:20.1	+4:45.6
31	60	Tomáš Mikyska	Czech Republic	2:58	3 (2+0+1+0)	38:28.1	+4:53.6
32	49	Éric Perrot	France	2:44	4 (0+2+1+1)	38:37.1	+5:02.6
33	38	George Buta	Romania	2:33	3 (1+1+1+0)	38:37.9	+5:03.4
34	56	Thierry Langer	Belgium	2:49	3 (0+2+0+1)	38:38.1	+5:03.6
35	28	Lukas Hofer	Italy	2:05	5 (1+0+3+1)	38:38.8	+5:04.3
36	41	Alexandr Mukhin	Kazakhstan	2:35	2 (1+0+0+1)	38:39.0	+5:04.5
37	23	Simon Eder	Austria	1:59	1 (0+0+0+1)	38:45.7	+5:11.2
38	26	Timofey Lapshin	South Korea	2:04	4 (1+2+0+1)	38:55.0	+5:20.5
39	44	Artem Pryma	Ukraine	2:37	4 (1+0+1+2)	39:10.4	+5:35.9
40	29	Bogdan Tsymbal	Ukraine	2:08	4 (0+1+2+1)	39:13.3	+5:38.8
41	35	David Zobel	Germany	2:30	6 (1+2+1+2)	39:15.1	+5:40.6
42	32	George Coltea	Romania	2:19	6 (1+2+1+2)	39:19.6	+5:45.1
43	17	Tommaso Giacomel	Italy	1:48	8 (3+4+1+0)	39:30.0	+5:55.5
44	59	Dominic Unterweger	Austria	2:57	2 (0+1+0+1)	39:32.1	+5:57.6
45	46	Campbell Wright	New Zealand	2:41	6 (0+2+1+3)	39:41.9	+6:07.4
46	50	Patrick Braunhofer	Italy	2:44	2 (0+2+0+0)	39:42.6	+6:08.1
47	57	Pavel Magazeev	Moldova	2:51	4 (0+2+0+2)	39:43.2	+6:08.7
48	39	Jan Guńka	Poland	2:33	5 (2+1+0+2)	39:48.4	+6:13.9
49	42	Vytautas Strolia	Lithuania	2:36	5 (1+1+2+1)	39:55.7	+6:21.2
50	30	Olli Hiidensalo	Finland	2:10	7 (1+1+3+2)	40:13.1	+6:38.6
51	24	Adam Václavík	Czech Republic	1:59	11 (1+4+4+2)	40:41.4	+7:06.9
52	31	Paul Schommer	United States	2:10	8 (3+1+2+2)	40:53.2	+7:18.7
53	53	Elia Zeni	Italy	2:47	5 (1+1+1+2)	41:07.4	+7:32.9
54	34	Michal Šíma	Slovakia	2:29	5 (0+1+1+3)	41:10.4	+7:35.9
55	51	Raido Ränkel	Estonia	2:44	8 (3+1+2+2)	41:38.0	+8:03.5
56	40	Harald Lemmerer	Austria	2:34	6 (0+0+3+3)	42:44.1	+9:09.6
	36	Émilien Jacquelin	France	2:32	Did not start		
	37	Sebastian Stalder	Switzerland	2:32	Did not start		
	48	Matija Legović	Croatia	2:43	Did not start		
	58	Rene Zahkna	Estonia	2:55	Did not start		
