= Sturla Holm Lægreid =

Norwegian biathlete (born 1997)

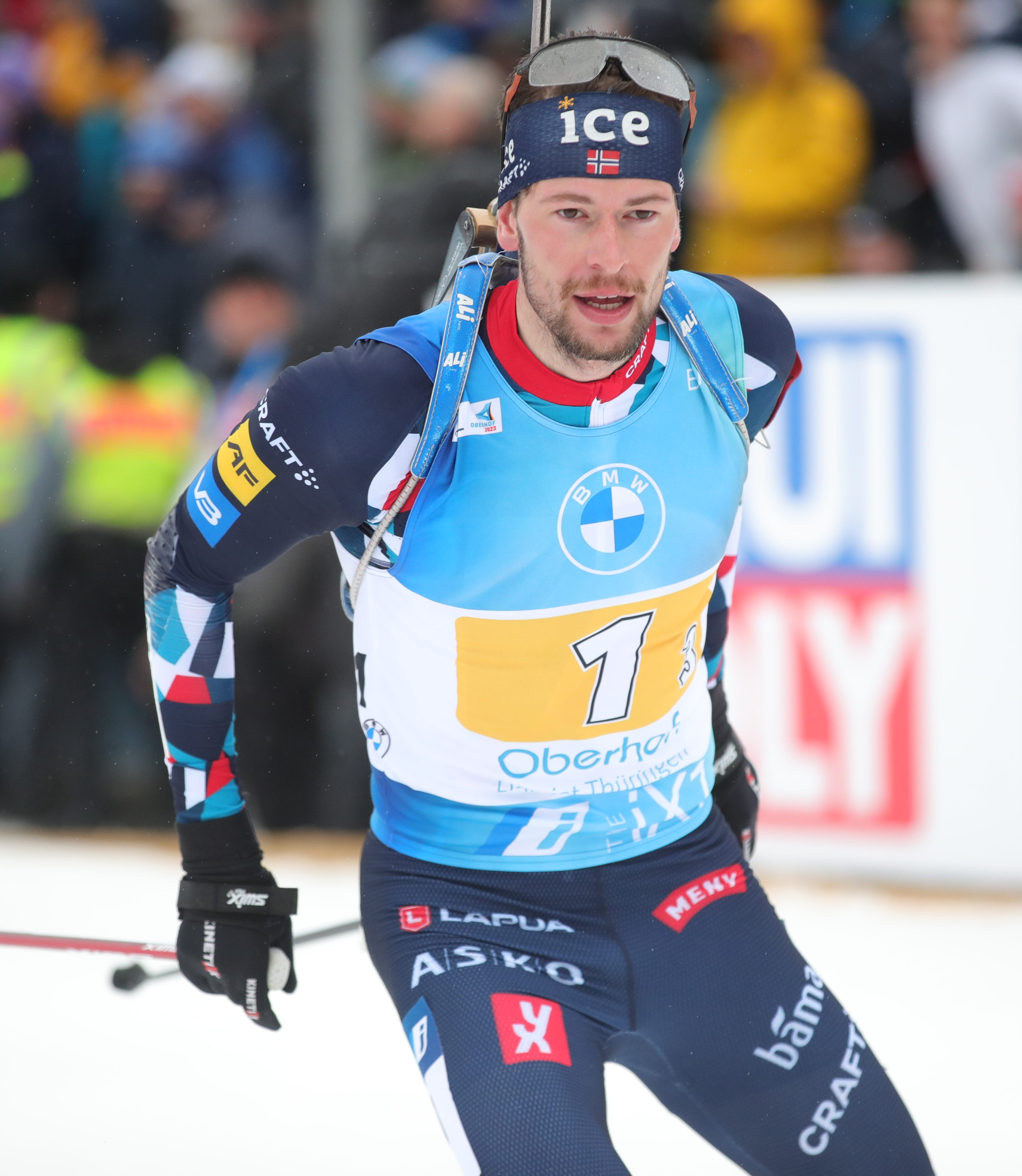
- Lægreid in 2023

Personal information
- Born: 20 February 1997 (age 29) Bærum, Norway
- Height: 1.81 m (5 ft 11 in)
- Weight: 75 kg (165 lb)

Sport

Professional information
- Sport: Biathlon
- Club: Bærums SK
- World Cup debut: 6 March 2020

Olympic Games
- Teams: 2 (2022, 2026)
- Medals: 6 (1 gold)

World Championships
- Teams: 4 (2021–2025)
- Medals: 14 (7 gold)

World Cup
- Seasons: 7
- Individual races: 145
- All races: 185
- Individual victories: 21
- All victories: 43
- Individual podiums: 63
- All podiums: 101
- Overall titles: 1 (2024–25)
- Discipline titles: 6: 2 Individual (2020–21, 2024–25); 1 Sprint (2025–26); 2 Pursuit (2020–21, 2024–25); 1 Mass Start (2024–25)
Medal record
Men's biathlon
Representing Norway
Event	1st	2nd	3rd
Olympic Games	1	3	2
World Championships	7	6	1
Total	8	9	3
Olympic Games
Gold medal – first place	2022 Beijing	4 × 7.5 km relay
Silver medal – second place	2026 Milano Cortina	12.5 km pursuit
Silver medal – second place	2026 Milano Cortina	15 km mass start
Silver medal – second place	2026 Milano Cortina	4 × 7.5 km relay
Bronze medal – third place	2026 Milano Cortina	10 km sprint
Bronze medal – third place	2026 Milano Cortina	20 km individual
World Championships
Gold medal – first place	2021 Pokljuka	20 km individual
Gold medal – first place	2021 Pokljuka	15 km mass start
Gold medal – first place	2021 Pokljuka	4 × 7.5 km relay
Gold medal – first place	2021 Pokljuka	Mixed relay
Gold medal – first place	2023 Oberhof	Mixed relay
Gold medal – first place	2024 Nové Město	10 km sprint
Gold medal – first place	2025 Lenzerheide	4 × 7.5 km relay
Silver medal – second place	2023 Oberhof	12.5 km pursuit
Silver medal – second place	2023 Oberhof	20 km individual
Silver medal – second place	2023 Oberhof	4 × 7.5 km relay
Silver medal – second place	2024 Nové Město	12.5 km pursuit
Silver medal – second place	2024 Nové Město	4 × 7.5 km relay
Silver medal – second place	2025 Lenzerheide	15 km mass start
Bronze medal – third place	2023 Oberhof	10 km sprint
Junior World Championships
Silver medal – second place	2018 Otepää	15 km individual
Silver medal – second place	2018 Otepää	4 × 7.5 km relay
- Updated on 22 March 2026

Sturla Holm Lægreid (born 20 February 1997) is a Norwegian biathlete. In the season opener of the 2020–2021 season, he earned his first World Cup win at the 20 km Individual. He is six-time Biathlon World Champion, 2024-2025 Biathlon World Cup winner and 2022 Olympic Champion in the relay.

== Career ==
=== Early years and first World Cup appearances (until 2020) ===
Sturla Holm Lægreid grew up in the municipality of Bærum near Oslo as the second of three children (with an older brother and a younger sister) in a sports-oriented family. He was introduced to various sports early in life: alongside skiing, he trained in sports such as football, taekwondo, and bandy. At the age of 16, he focused on biathlon and attended the WANG Sports Gymnasium in Oslo for three years. During this time, he participated in the 2015 European Youth Olympic Winter Festival in Bürserberg, Vorarlberg, where he won silver in the pursuit behind Sebastian Samuelsson and gold in the mixed relay alongside Mathea Tofte, Karoline Erdal, and Aleksander Fjeld Andersen.

After achieving success in national junior competitions, Holm Lægreid was included in Norway's team for the Biathlon Junior World Championships 2018 in Otepää at the age of 21. There, he won silver in the individual race and gold in the relay alongside Sivert Guttorm Bakken, Johannes Dale-Skjevdal, and Endre Strømsheim. Shortly afterward, he contracted mononucleosis, which restricted his training for eight months and caused him to miss most of the 2018/19 season. During this time, he restructured his shooting position based on video analysis of Martin Fourcade and worked on his rifle. However, upon returning to Norwegian Cup events at the end of 2019, he faced significant difficulties at the shooting range and subsequently began mental training and meditation. In February 2020, he won a mass start event at the IBU Cup in Martell. This performance earned him a nomination for the 2020 Biathlon European Championships in Minsk, where he secured a silver medal in the pursuit behind Sergey Bocharnikov from Belarus. Toward the season's end, Lægreid made his first four World Cup appearances in Nové Město na Moravě and Kontiolahti, hitting 59 of 60 shots and finishing between tenth and fifteenth place in all four races.

=== Rapid rise to the world elite (since 2020) ===
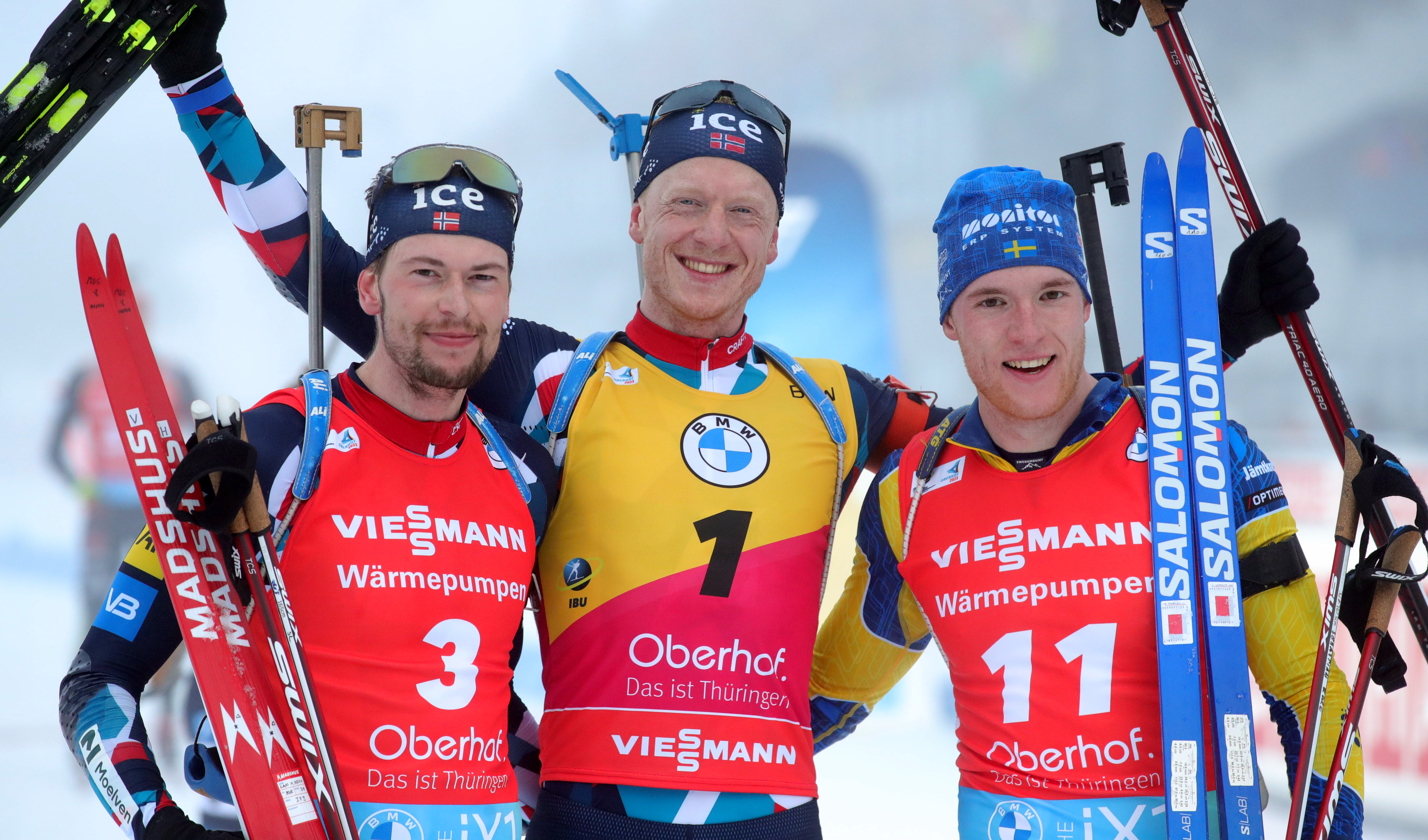
Holm Lægreid (left) with Johannes Thingnes Bø and Sebastian Samuelsson after the 2023 Biathlon World Championships pursuit

In summer 2020, the Norwegian Biathlon Association included Holm Lægreid in its six-member elite national team. At the first World Cup of the new season in Kontiolahti, he surprisingly won the season-opening 20 km individual race with clean shooting during just his fifth start in the series, taking the yellow bib as overall leader. Over the season, Holm Lægreid achieved six more individual victories and finished second in the overall standings behind teammate Johannes Thingnes Bø. He won the discipline standings in both the individual and pursuit events, as well as the newly introduced U25 classification. At the 2021 Biathlon World Championships in Pokljuka, he claimed four gold medals: in the individual, mass start, men's relay, and mixed relay, where he was the starting skier in each race. His strength lay particularly at the shooting range, hitting 97% of his targets in the World Championship individual races and more than 92% throughout the season. He was the second-best shooter of the winter after Simon Eder. Holm Lægreid cited his lack of sprinting ability as his main weakness.

In the 2021/22 Olympic season, Holm Lægreid won two individual and four relay World Cup races. He once again placed second in the overall standings, this time behind Quentin Fillon Maillet. At the 2022 Winter Olympics in Beijing, he displayed shooting weaknesses and did not win any individual medals. In the men's relay, he was responsible for Norway's only penalty loop as the starting skier and handed over in seventh place to Tarjei Bø. The relay, which also included Johannes Thingnes Bø and Vetle Sjåstad Christiansen, ultimately won the race, earning Holm Lægreid an Olympic gold medal. In the 2022/23 season, Holm Lægreid placed second in the overall standings for the third consecutive time, again behind Johannes Thingnes Bø, who won 16 of the 21 season races. Holm Lægreid achieved one victory, in the pursuit in Annecy/Le Grand-Bornand under challenging conditions. At the 2023 Biathlon World Championships, Holm Lægreid and Thingnes Bø became World Champions in the mixed relay and won silver in the men's relay. Holm Lægreid also won silver in the pursuit and the 20 km individual race and bronze in the sprint, each time behind Thingnes Bø. Late in the season, Holm Lægreid missed some competitions due to a COVID-19 infection.

At the start of the 2023–24 Biathlon World Cup season, Holm Lægreid struggled for form during the Östersund races and repeatedly missed the top ten. He returned to the podium in subsequent competitions. During the Lenzerheide World Cup in December 2023, Holm Lægreid accidentally fired a shot in the team accommodation during dry-fire practice, having mistakenly loaded a full magazine instead of an empty one. The shot hit a stool. For violating the safety rules of the world governing body, he was disqualified from the mass start race in Lenzerheide.

At the World Championships in Nové Město on 10 February 2024, he became the world champion in the sprint, ahead of Johannes Thingnes Bø. In December 2024, together with Karoline Offigstad Knotten, he won the World Team Challenge in both the mass start and the pursuit, which took place at the Veltins-Arena in Gelsenkirchen.

== Biathlon results ==
All results are sourced from the International Biathlon Union.

=== Olympic Games ===
6 medals (1 gold, 3 silver, 2 bronze)

Event	Individual	Sprint	Pursuit	Mass start	Relay	Mixed relay
(China) 2022 Beijing	15th	7th	24th	6th	Gold	—
(Italy) 2026 Milano Cortina	Bronze	Bronze	Silver	Silver	Silver	—

=== World Championships ===
14 medals (7 gold, 6 silver, 1 bronze)

Event	Individual	Sprint	Pursuit	Mass start	Relay	Mixed relay	Single mixed relay
(Slovenia) 2021 Pokljuka	Gold	7th	6th	Gold	Gold	Gold	−
(Germany) 2023 Oberhof	Silver	Bronze	Silver	4th	Silver	Gold	−
(Czech Republic) 2024 Nové Mĕsto	18th	Gold	Silver	17th	Silver	–	–
(Switzerland) 2025 Lenzerheide	15th	9th	4th	Silver	Gold	4th	–

*During Olympic seasons competitions are only held for those events not included in the Olympic program.
**The single mixed relay was added as an event in 2019.

=== World Cup ===
Season	Overall		Individual		Sprint		Pursuit		Mass start	
Season	Points	Position	Points	Position	Points	Position	Points	Position	Points	Position
2019–20	115	43rd	–	–	59	37th	30	41st	26	34th
2020–21	1039	2nd	120	1st	319	2nd	306	1st	161	4th
2021–22	736	2nd	100	2nd	284	3rd	199	7th	153	4th
2022–23	1098	2nd	90	8th	375	2nd	425	2nd	208	3rd
2023–24	862	4th	135	4th	302	3rd	294	5th	131	8th
2024–25	1291	1st	165	1st	381	2nd	430	1st	315	1st
2025–26	984	2nd	125	4th	356	1st	329	3rd	174	3rd

- Standings through 22 March 2026

† – season in progress

Individual podiums

- 21 victories (4 In, 5 Sp, 9 Pu, 3 Ms)
- 63 podiums

No.	Season	Date	Location	Discipline	Level	Place
1	2020–21	28 November 2020	(Finland) Kontiolahti	20 km Individual	World Cup	1st
2	2020–21	17 December 2020	(Austria) Hochfilzen	10 km Sprint	World Cup	1st
3	2020–21	19 December 2020	(Austria) Hochfilzen	12.5 km Pursuit	World Cup	1st
4	2020–21	8 January 2021	(Germany) Oberhof	10 km Sprint	World Cup	3rd
5	2020–21	9 January 2021	(Germany) Oberhof	12.5 km Pursuit	World Cup	1st
6	2020–21	13 January 2021	(Germany) Oberhof	10 km Sprint	World Cup	2nd
7	2020–21	22 January 2021	(Italy) Antholz-Anterselva	20 km Individual	World Cup	2nd
8	2020–21	17 February 2021	(Slovenia) Pokljuka	20 km Individual	World Championships	1st
9	2020–21	21 February 2021	(Slovenia) Pokljuka	15 km Mass start	World Championships	1st
10	2020–21	20 March 2021	(Sweden) Östersund	12.5 km Pursuit	World Cup	1st
11	2021–22	27 November 2021	(Sweden) Östersund	20 km Individual	World Cup	1st
12	2021–22	7 January 2022	(Germany) Oberhof	10 km Sprint	World Cup	3rd
13	2021–22	22 January 2022	(Italy) Antholz-Anterselva	15 km Mass start	World Cup	3rd
14	2021–22	10 March 2022	(Estonia) Otepää	10 km Sprint	World Cup	2nd
15	2021–22	18 March 2022	(Norway) Oslo Holmenkollen	10 km Sprint	World Cup	1st
16	2021–22	19 March 2022	(Norway) Oslo Holmenkollen	12.5 km Pursuit	World Cup	3rd
17	2021–22	20 March 2022	(Norway) Oslo Holmenkollen	15 km Mass start	World Cup	2nd
18	2022–23	3 December 2022	(Finland) Kontiolahti	10 km Sprint	World Cup	2nd
19	2022–23	4 December 2022	(Finland) Kontiolahti	12.5 km Pursuit	World Cup	2nd
20	2022–23	9 December 2022	(Austria) Hochfilzen	10 km Sprint	World Cup	3rd
21	2022–23	11 December 2022	(Austria) Hochfilzen	12.5 km Pursuit	World Cup	2nd
22	2022–23	15 December 2022	(France) Annecy-Le Grand-Bornand	10 km Sprint	World Cup	2nd
23	2022–23	17 December 2022	(France) Annecy-Le Grand-Bornand	12.5 km Pursuit	World Cup	1st
24	2022–23	18 December 2022	(France) Annecy-Le Grand-Bornand	15 km Mass start	World Cup	2nd
25	2022–23	6 January 2023	(Slovenia) Pokljuka	10 km Sprint	World Cup	3rd
26	2022–23	15 January 2023	(Germany) Ruhpolding	15 km Mass start	World Cup	3rd
27	2022–23	20 January 2023	(Italy) Antholz-Anterselva	10 km Sprint	World Cup	3rd
28	2022–23	21 January 2023	(Italy) Antholz-Anterselva	12.5 km Pursuit	World Cup	2nd
29	2022–23	11 February 2023	(Germany) Oberhof	10 km Sprint	World Championships	3rd
30	2022–23	12 February 2023	(Germany) Oberhof	12.5 km Pursuit	World Championships	2nd
31	2022–23	14 February 2023	(Germany) Oberhof	20 km Individual	World Championships	2nd
32	2022–23	18 March 2023	(Norway) Oslo Holmenkollen	12.5 km Pursuit	World Cup	3rd
33	2023–24	8 December 2023	(Austria) Hochfilzen	10 km Sprint	World Cup	2nd
34	2023–24	16 December 2023	(Switzerland) Lenzerheide	12.5 km Pursuit	World Cup	3rd
35	2023–24	5 January 2024	(Germany) Oberhof	10 km Sprint	World Cup	2nd
36	2023–24	6 January 2024	(Germany) Oberhof	12.5 km Pursuit	World Cup	2nd
37	2023–24	10 February 2024	(Czech Republic) Nové Město	10 km Sprint	World Championships	1st
38	2023–24	11 February 2024	(Czech Republic) Nové Město	12.5 km Pursuit	World Championships	2nd
39	2023–24	1 March 2024	(Norway) Oslo Holmenkollen	20 km Individual	World Cup	1st
40	2023–24	2 March 2024	(Norway) Oslo Holmenkollen	15 km Mass start	World Cup	1st
41	2024–25	3 December 2024	(Finland) Kontiolahti	15 km Short Individual	World Cup	3rd
42	2024–25	8 December 2024	(Finland) Kontiolahti	15 km Mass start	World Cup	3rd
43	2024–25	13 December 2024	(Austria) Hochfilzen	10 km Sprint	World Cup	2nd
44	2024–25	14 December 2024	(Austria) Hochfilzen	12.5 km Pursuit	World Cup	3rd
45	2024–25	11 January 2025	(Germany) Oberhof	12.5 km Pursuit	World Cup	1st
46	2024–25	19 January 2025	(Germany) Ruhpolding	15 km Mass start	World Cup	2nd
47	2024–25	24 January 2025	(Italy) Antholz-Anterselva	10 km Sprint	World Cup	2nd
48	2024–25	26 January 2025	(Italy) Antholz-Anterselva	12.5 km Pursuit	World Cup	1st
49	2024–25	23 February 2025	(Switzerland) Lenzerheide	15 km Mass start	World Championships	2nd
50	2024–25	13 March 2025	(Slovenia) Pokljuka	15 km Short Individual	World Cup	2nd
51	2024–25	15 March 2025	(Slovenia) Pokljuka	15 km Mass start	World Cup	3rd
52	2024–25	21 March 2025	(Norway) Oslo Holmenkollen	10 km Sprint	World Cup	2nd
53	2024–25	22 March 2025	(Norway) Oslo Holmenkollen	12.5 km Pursuit	World Cup	1st
54	2025–26	10 February 2026	(Italy) Antholz-Anterselva	20 km Individual	Olympic Games	3rd
55	2025–26	13 February 2026	(Italy) Antholz-Anterselva	10 km Sprint	Olympic Games	3rd
56	2025–26	15 February 2026	(Italy) Antholz-Anterselva	12.5 km Pursuit	Olympic Games	2nd
57	2025–26	20 February 2026	(Italy) Antholz-Anterselva	15 km Mass Start	Olympic Games	2nd
58	2025–26	6 March 2026	(Finland) Kontiolahti	20 km Individual	World Cup	2nd
59	2025–26	8 March 2026	(Finland) Kontiolahti	15 km Mass Start	World Cup	1st
60	2025–26	12 March 2026	(Estonia) Otepää	10 km Sprint	World Cup	1st
61	2025–26	14 March 2026	(Estonia) Otepää	12.5 km Pursuit	World Cup	1st
62	2025–26	20 March 2026	(Norway) Oslo Holmenkollen	10 km Sprint	World Cup	1st
63	2025–26	21 March 2026	(Norway) Oslo Holmenkollen	12.5 km Pursuit	World Cup	1st

*Results are from IBU races which include the Biathlon World Cup, Biathlon World Championships and the Winter Olympic Games.

== Personal life ==
Moments after earning an Olympic bronze medal at the 2026 Winter Olympics, Holm Lægreid admitted in a live TV interview to cheating on his girlfriend of six months. Calling her the "love of his life", he stated the week leading up to the Olympics had been the worst week of his life after confessing his infidelity to his girlfriend and called the affair "my biggest mistake". The remarks received widespread media coverage and generated substantial public commentary on social media and in international press outlets.

His ex-girlfriend said that Holm Lægreid's actions were "hard to forgive".
