= Maksim Fomin =

Lithuanian biathlete (born 2000)

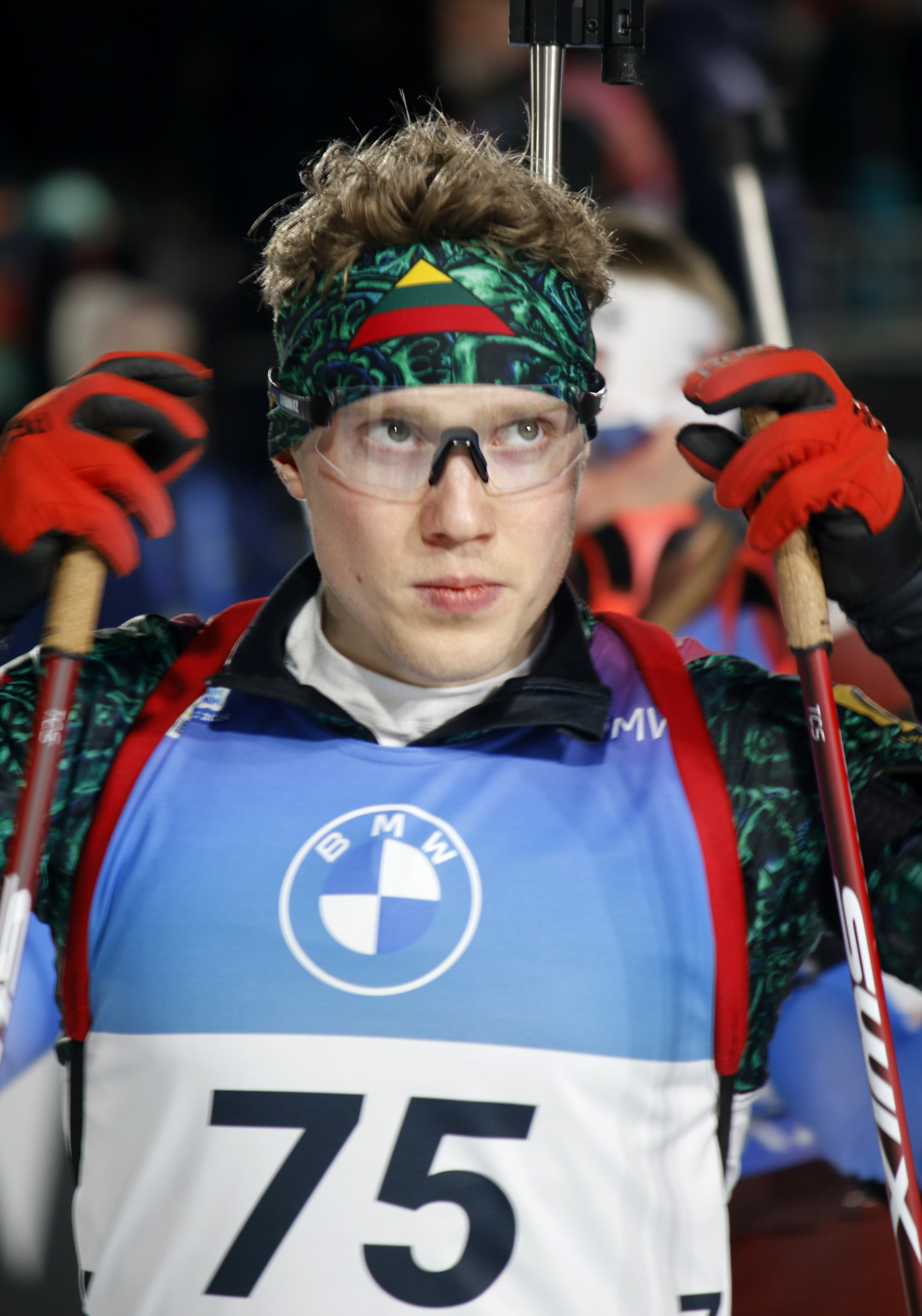
- Fomin in 2024

Personal information
- Full name: Maksim Fomin
- Born: 12 October 2000 (age 25) Visaginas, Lithuania

Sport

Professional information
- Sport: Biathlon
- Club: VSRC/SK Favoritas
Medal record
Men's biathlon
Representing Lithuania
World Junior Summer Championships
Gold medal – first place	2022 Ruhpolding	Super-Sprint

Maksim Fomin (Lithuanian: Maksimas Fominas; born 12 October 2000) is a Lithuanian biathlete who competed in the Biathlon World Cup and won the summer super-sprint world junior championship in 2022.

== Biathlon results ==
All results are sourced from the International Biathlon Union.

=== Olympic Games ===
0 medals

Event	Individual	Sprint	Pursuit	Mass start	Relay	Mixed relay
(Italy) 2026 Milano Cortina	56th	71st	—	—	15th	—

=== World Championships ===
0 medals

Event	Individual	Sprint	Pursuit	Mass start	Relay	Mixed relay	Single mixed relay
(Germany) 2023 Oberhof	98th	95th	—N/a	—N/a	16th	—N/a	—N/a
(Czech Republic) 2024 Nové Město na Moravě	65th	79th	—N/a	—N/a	20th	17th	—N/a
(Switzerland) 2025 Lenzerheide	40th	70th	—N/a	—N/a	18th	16th	—N/a
