= Andrzej Nędza-Kubiniec =

Polish biathlete (born 1991)

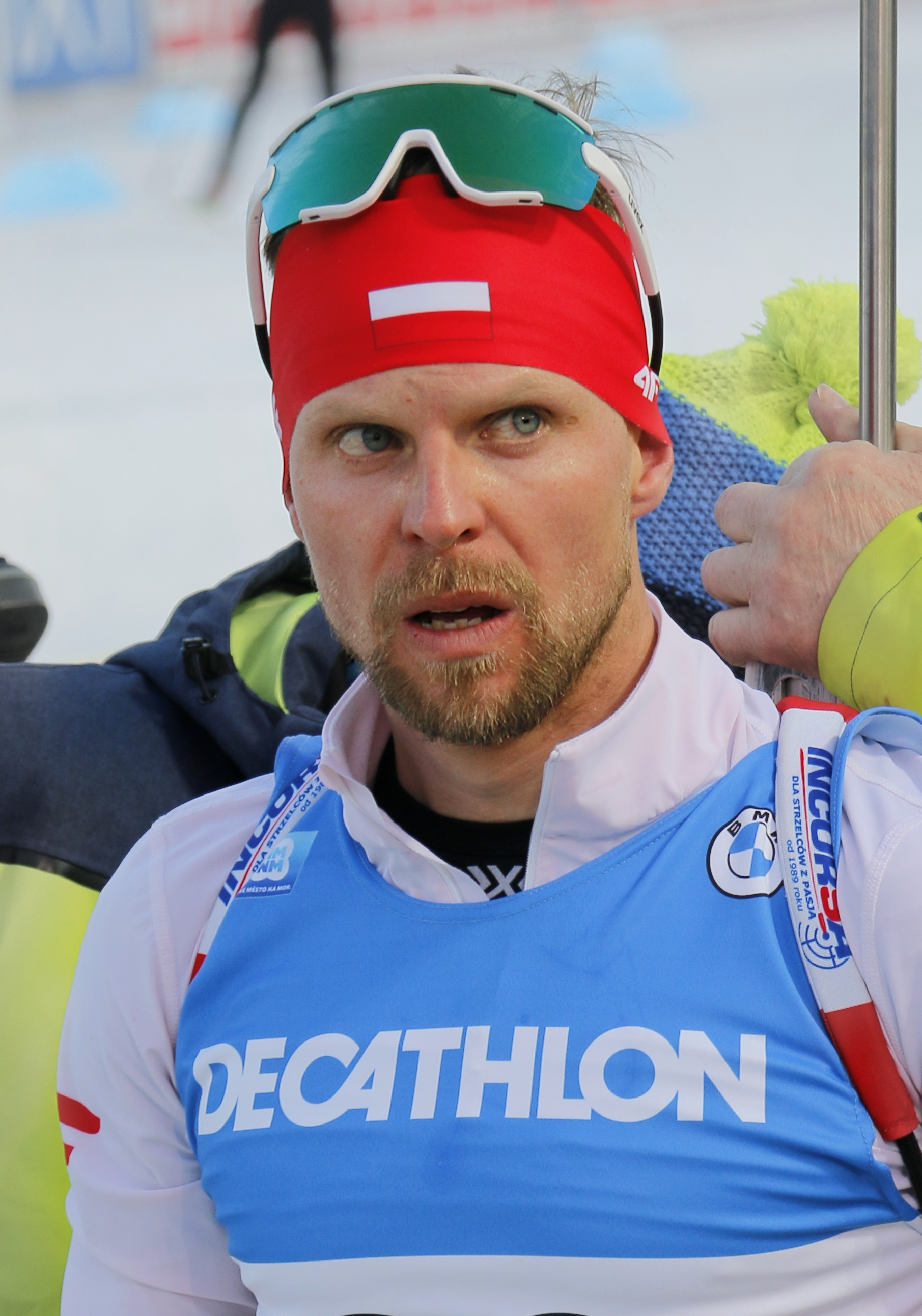
- Nędza-Kubiniec in 2023

Personal information
- Nationality: Polish
- Born: 19 June 1991 (age 33); Zakopane, Poland

Sport
- Sport: Biathlon

Andrzej Nędza-Kubiniec (born 19 June 1991) is a Polish biathlete. He competed in the 2018 Winter Olympics.

== Biathlon results ==
All results are sourced from the International Biathlon Union.

=== Olympic Games ===
0 medals

Event	Individual	Sprint	Pursuit	Mass start	Relay	Mixed relay
(South Korea) 2018 Pyeongchang	79th	67th	—	—	—	16th

=== World Championships ===
0 medals

Event	Individual	Sprint	Pursuit	Mass start	Relay	Mixed relay	Single Mixed relay
(Austria) 2017 Hochfilzen	53rd	—	—	—	24th	—	—
(Sweden) 2019 Östersund	57th	82nd	—	—	16th	—	23rd
(Italy) 2020 Rasen-Antholz	39th	90th	—	—	16th	—	18th
(Slovenia) 2021 Pokljuka	57th	87th	—	—	24th	24th	—
(Germany) 2023 Oberhof	43rd	77th	—	—	17th	22nd	—
(Czech Republic) 2024 Nové Město na Moravě	51st	69th	—	—	9th	15th	—

*During Olympic seasons competitions are only held for those events not included in the Olympic program.
**The single mixed relay was added as an event in 2019.
