= Joscha Burkhalter =

Swiss biathlete (born 1996)

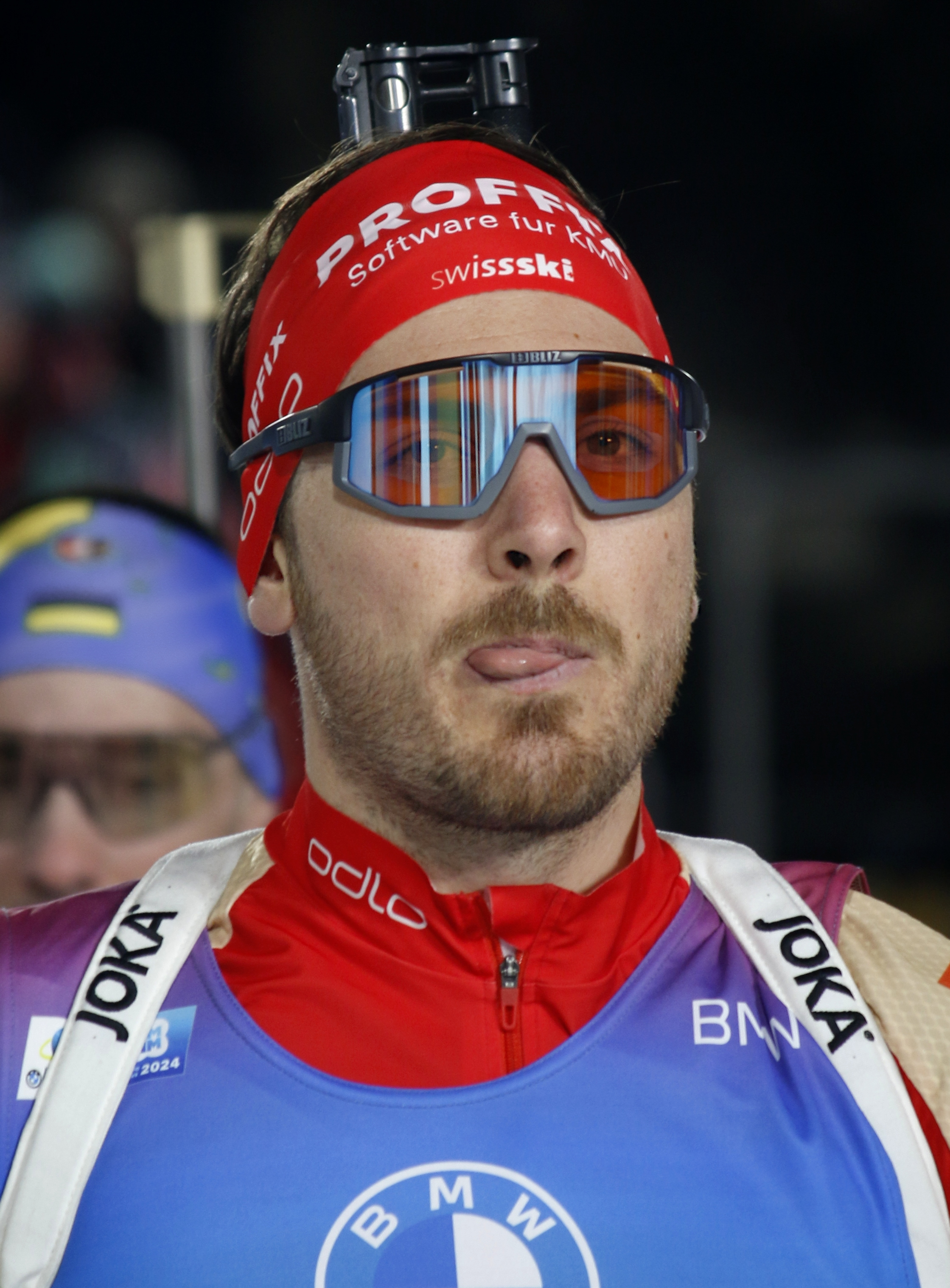

Personal information
- Nationality: Swiss
- Born: 11 July 1996 (age 30) Erlenbach, Switzerland
- Height: 1.79 m (5 ft 10 in)

Sport
- Sport: Skiing
- Club: SC Zweisimmen

Joscha Burkhalter (born 11 July 1996) is a Swiss biathlete who represented Switzerland at the 2022 Winter Olympics.

== Career results ==
=== Olympic Games ===
0 medals

Event	Individual	Sprint	Pursuit	Mass start	Relay	Mixed relay
(China) 2022 Beijing	22nd	45th	LAP	—	12th	—
(Italy) 2026 Milano Cortina	36th	14th	33rd	11th	8th	—

=== World Championships ===
0 medals

Event	Individual	Sprint	Pursuit	Mass start	Relay	Mixed relay	Single mixed relay
(Italy) 2020 Antholz	72nd	71st	—	—	15th	—	—
(Germany) 2023 Oberhof	36th	72nd	—	—	—	—	—
(Czech Republic) 2024 Nové Město na Moravě	55th	57th	44th	—	14th	—	—
(Switzerland) 2025 Lenzerheide	29th	21st	21st	26th	7th	—	—
