= Dmitrii Shamaev =

Russian-Romanian biathlete (born 1995)

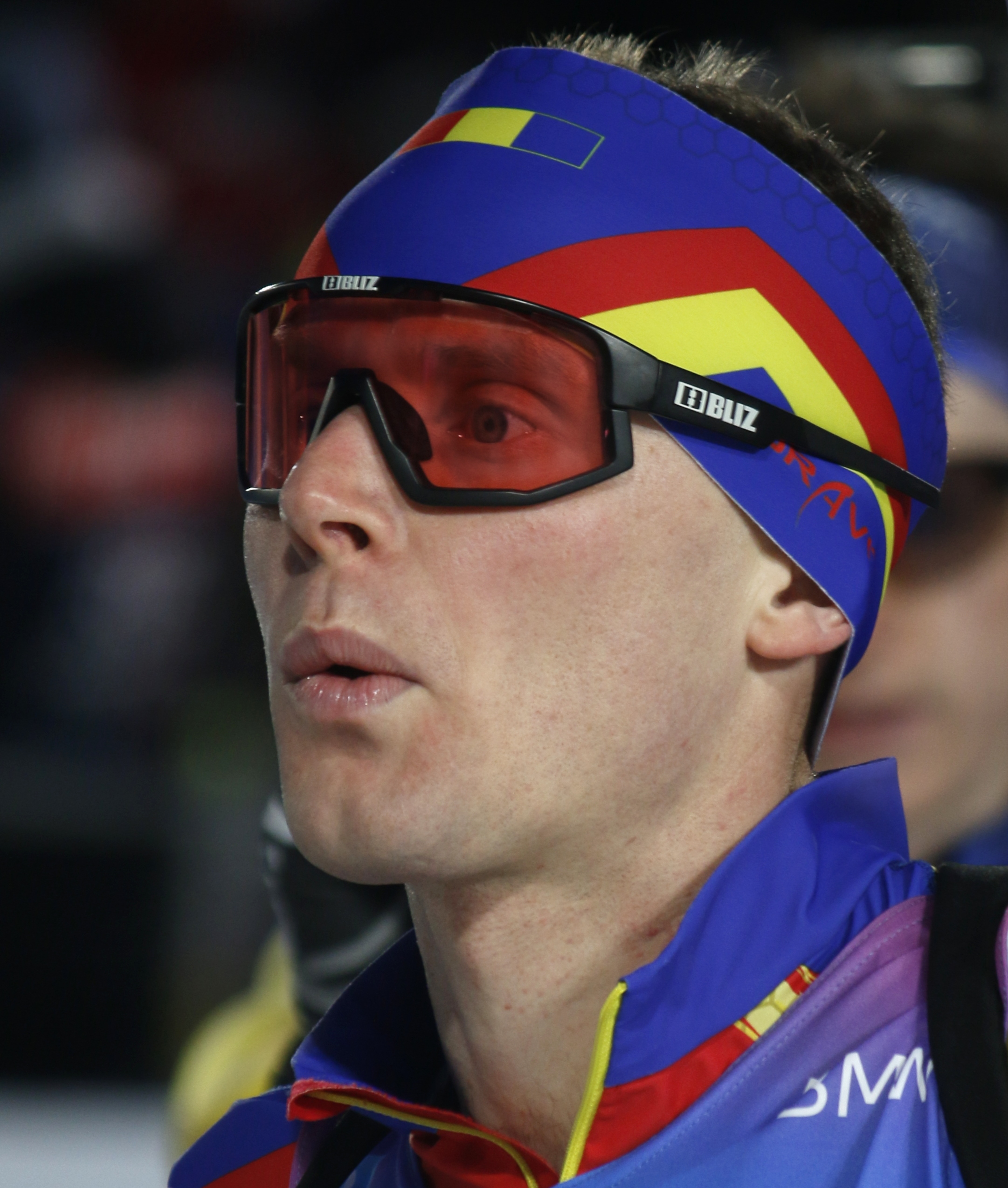
- Shamaev in 2024

Personal information
- Nationality: Russian, Romanian
- Born: 30 June 1995 (age 30) Izhevsk, Russia

Sport
- Country: Romania
- Sport: Biathlon
Medal record
Men's biathlon
Representing Romania
European Championships
Silver medal – second place	2024 Osrblie	12.5 km pursuit
Representing Russia
World Junior Championships
Gold medal – first place	2016 Cheile Grădiştei	4 × 7.5 km relay
World Youth Championships
Gold medal – first place	2014 Presque Isle	3 × 7.5 km relay
Bronze medal – third place	2014 Presque Isle	7.5 km sprint
Bronze medal – third place	2014 Presque Isle	10 km pursuit

Dmitrii Shamaev (born 30 June 1995) is a Russian-born Romanian biathlete. He has competed in the Biathlon World Cup since 2021.

== Career ==
Dmitrii Shamaev started his international career at the 2014 World Youth Championships in Presque Isle, and immediately won his first individual medals in sprint and pursuit, behind Sean Doherty and Marco Groß. He was also victorious with the youth relay team of Yaroslav Kostyukov and Viktor Plitsev. The following year, the Russian competed in the junior events at the 2015 European Championships and again won gold in the mixed relay, narrowly missing out on a medal in the individual event. In the newly created IBU Junior Cup, Shamayev finished in the top 10 twice in 2015/16, while his third relay gold came at the 2016 Junior World Championships with Viktor Plitsev, Nikita Porshnev and Kirill Streltsov. He last competed for his native country at the Summer Biathlon World Championships in the same year. In the summer of 2021, Shamayev and his teammate Natalia Ushkina were granted Romanian citizenship and have been competing for the Romanian Biathlon Federation. In 2024, Shamaev won a silver medal in the pursuit at the European Championships.

== Personal life ==
In 2023, he married Belarusian biathlete Elena Kruchinkina.

== Biathlon results ==
All results are sourced from the International Biathlon Union.

=== Olympic Games ===
0 medals

Event	Individual	Sprint	Pursuit	Mass start	Relay	Mixed relay
(Italy) 2026 Milano Cortina	70th	54th	38th	—	20th	—

=== World Championships ===
Event	Individual	Sprint	Pursuit	Mass start	Relay	Mixed relay	Single mixed relay
(Germany) 2023 Oberhof	25th	91st	—	—	8th	—	—
(Czech Republic) 2024 Nové Město	22nd	59th	DNS	—	15th	23rd	20th
(Switzerland) 2025 Lenzerheide	80th	—	—	—	22nd	—	—

=== World Cup ===
Season	Overall			Individual		Sprint		Pursuit		Mass start	
Season	Races	Points	Position	Points	Position	Points	Position	Points	Position	Points	Position
2021–22	7/22	Didn't earn World Cup points									
2022–23	15/21	24	72nd	—	—	16	59th	8	66th	—	—
2023–24	15/21	6	83rd	6	58th	—	—	—	—	—	—
