= Raido Ränkel =

Estonian cross-country skier (born 1990)

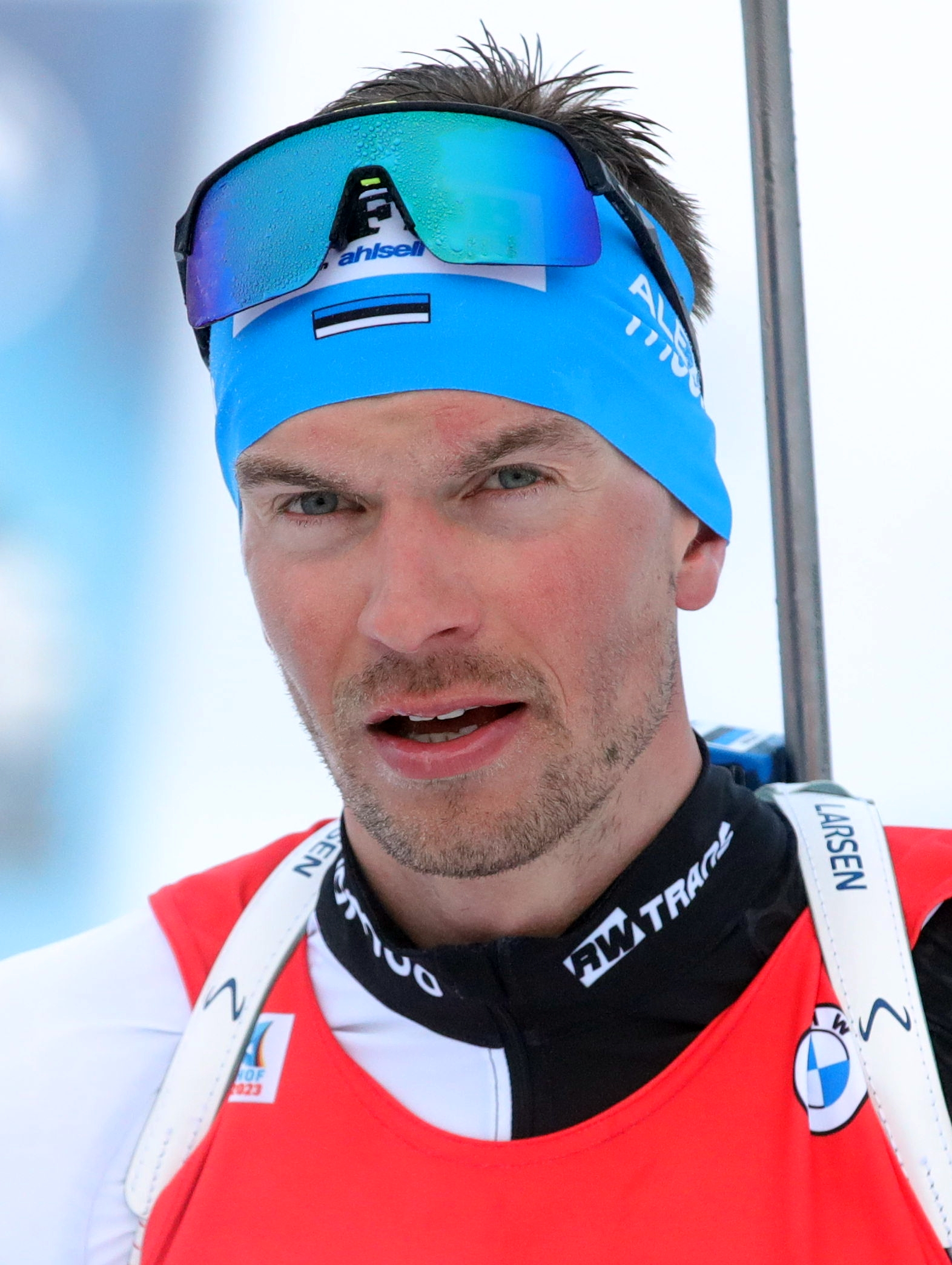
- Raido Ränkel in Oberhof, Germany in February 2023

Personal information
- Born: 13 January 1990 (age 36) Rakvere, then part of Estonian SSR, Soviet Union
- Height: 1.86 m (6 ft 1 in)
- Weight: 76 kg (168 lb)

Sport

Raido Ränkel (born 13 January 1990 in Rakvere) is a former cross-country skier and a biathlete from Estonia.

He competed for Estonia at the 2014 Winter Olympics and 2018 Winter Olympics in the cross country skiing events, and biathlon at the 2022 Winter Olympics.

== Biathlon results ==
All results are sourced from the International Biathlon Union.

=== Olympic Games ===
Event	Individual	Sprint	Pursuit	Mass start	Relay	Mixed relay
(China) 2022 Beijing	73rd	51st	47th	—	15th	—

=== World Championships ===
Event	Individual	Sprint	Pursuit	Mass start	Relay	Mixed relay	Single Mixed relay
(Slovenia) 2021 Pokljuka	—	89th	—	—	21st	—	—
(Germany) 2023 Oberhof	—	51st	55th	—	15th	—	—
(Czech Republic) 2024 Nove Mesto	78th	51st	53rd	—	17th	—	—

*During Olympic seasons competitions are only held for those events not included in the Olympic program.
**The single mixed relay was added as an event in 2019.
