= Vetle Sjåstad Christiansen =

Norwegian biathlete (born 1992)

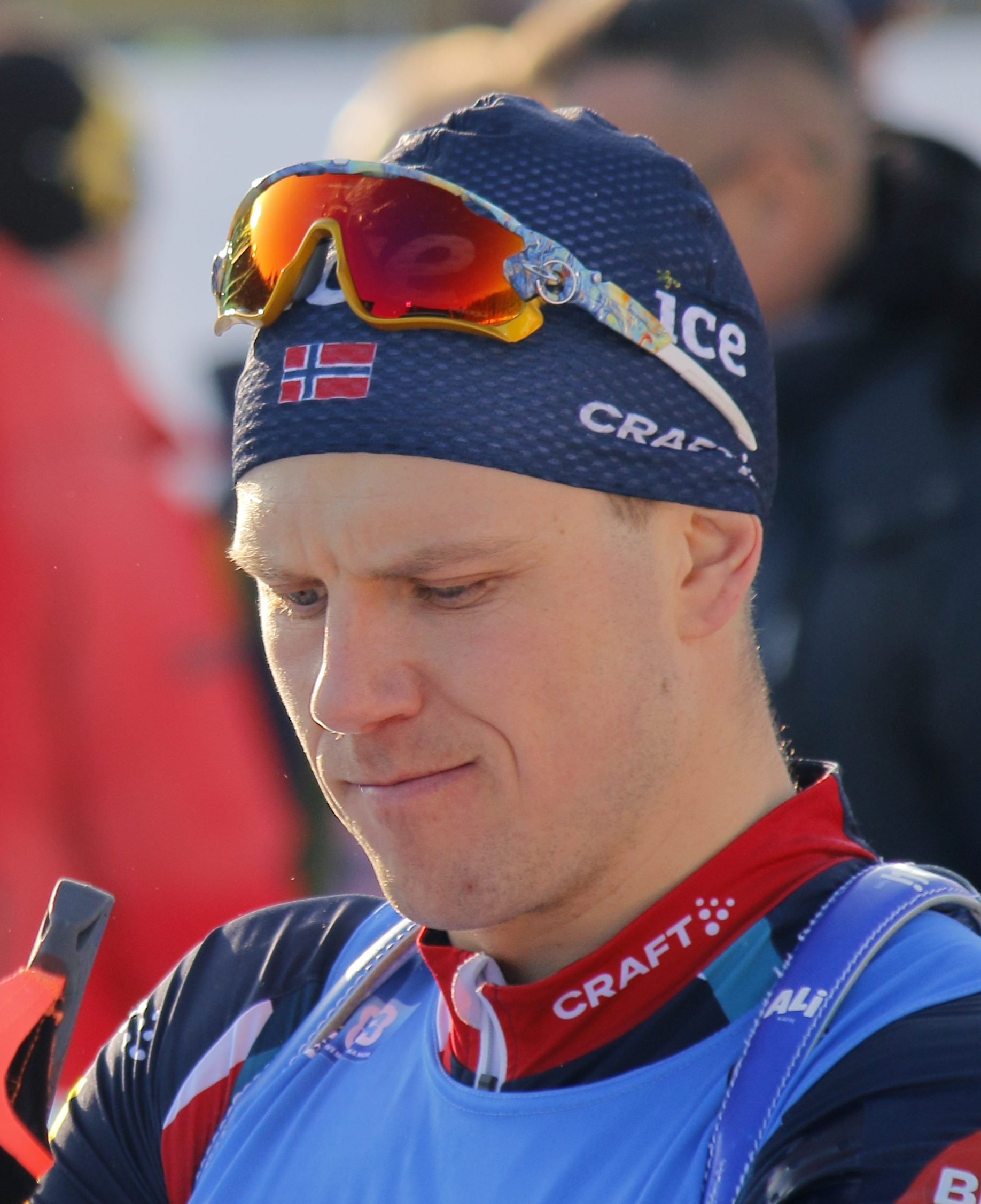
- Sjåstad Christiansen in 2023

Personal information
- Nationality: Norwegian
- Born: 12 May 1992 (age 34) Geilo, Norway
- Height: 1.93 m (6 ft 4 in)
- Weight: 90 kg (198 lb)

Sport

Professional information
- Sport: Biathlon
- Club: Geilo IL
- World Cup debut: 1 December 2012

Olympic Games
- Teams: 2 (2022, 2026)
- Medals: 4 (1 gold)

World Championships
- Teams: 4 (2019, 2020, 2023, 2024)
- Medals: 8 (3 gold)

World Cup
- Seasons: 14 (2012/13–present)
- Individual races: 207
- All races: 265
- Individual victories: 7
- All victories: 40
- Individual podiums: 30
- All podiums: 81
- Overall titles: 0
- Discipline titles: 2: 1 Individual (2022-23); 1 Mass Start (2022-23)
Medal record
Men's biathlon
Representing Norway
Olympic Games
Gold medal – first place	2022 Beijing	4 × 7.5 km relay
Silver medal – second place	2026 Milano Cortina	10 km sprint
Silver medal – second place	2026 Milano Cortina	4 × 7.5 km relay
Bronze medal – third place	2022 Beijing	15 km mass start
World Championships
Gold medal – first place	2019 Östersund	4 × 7.5 km relay
Gold medal – first place	2019 Östersund	Mixed relay
Gold medal – first place	2021 Pokljuka	4 × 7.5 km relay
Silver medal – second place	2020 Antholz	4 × 7.5 km relay
Silver medal – second place	2023 Oberhof	4 × 7.5 km relay
Silver medal – second place	2024 Nové Město	4 × 7.5 km relay
Bronze medal – third place	2024 Nové Město	10 km sprint
Bronze medal – third place	2024 Nové Město	12.5 km pursuit
European Championships
Gold medal – first place	2013 Bansko	10 km sprint
Gold medal – first place	2018 Ridnaun	Single mixed relay
Gold medal – first place	2025 Val Martello	4 × 7.5 km relay
Silver medal – second place	2013 Bansko	12.5 km pursuit
Silver medal – second place	2017 Duszniki-Zdrój	Single mixed relay
Silver medal – second place	2025 Val Martello	10 km sprint
Bronze medal – third place	2016 Tyumen	Single mixed relay
Junior World Championships
Gold medal – first place	2012 Kontiolahti	4 × 7.5 km relay
Silver medal – second place	2012 Kontiolahti	12.5 km pursuit
Bronze medal – third place	2011 Nové Město	4 × 7.5 km relay
Youth World Championships
Silver medal – second place	2011 Nové Město	7.5 km sprint
Silver medal – second place	2011 Nové Město	10 km pursuit
Bronze medal – third place	2010 Torsby	12.5 km individual
Bronze medal – third place	2010 Torsby	7.5 km sprint
Bronze medal – third place	2010 Torsby	3 × 7.5 km relay
Bronze medal – third place	2011 Nové Město	12.5 km individual
Junior European Championships
Gold medal – first place	2012 Brezno-Osrblie	10 km sprint
Gold medal – first place	2012 Brezno-Osrblie	Mixed relay
Silver medal – second place	2012 Brezno-Osrblie	12.5 km pursuit
Bronze medal – third place	2012 Brezno-Osrblie	15 km individual
- Updated on 22 March 2026

Vetle Sjåstad Christiansen (born 12 May 1992) is a Norwegian biathlete.

== Early life ==
Sjåstad Christiansen was born in Geilo, a centre in the municipality of Hol, to Randi Sjåstad and her husband, Georg William Christiansen. His younger sister, Tiril Sjåstad Christiansen, is a successful freestyle skier.

Sjåstad Christiansen began his career by racing in biathlon and cross-country skiing as a junior on the national level. In his youth, his greatest idol was Ole Einar Bjørndalen. Sjåstad Christiansen learned much about how to train from literature of and about Bjørndalen, and was inspired by Bjørndalen's training mentality, and started training a lot and hard from a very early age. On the last day of the 2004 World Championships, Sjåstad Christiansen set a long-term goal of qualifying for the 2014 Winter Olympics. In 2008, Sjåstad Christiansen entered the Norwegian College of Elite Sport in Geilo.

== Career ==
=== Early career and World Cup debut ===
Before turning 17, Sjåstad Christiansen had made a clean sweep at the Junior Norwegian Championships in his age group, winning four gold medals and the Norwegian Biathlon Cup (Norgescupen) in his age category, called the Statkraft Junior Cup overall. He had also won two golds in the Junior Norwegian Summer Biathlon Championships in September 2008, in the 17-year-olds age group. At the end of the 2008–09 season, Sjåstad Christiansen participated in the 2009 Norwegian Biathlon Championships. He did not participate in the 20 km individual, but finished 17th in the sprint and 8th in the pursuit. This caused Sjåstad Christiansen to be selected for the first team of Buskerud alongside Christian Georg Bache, Frode Andresen and Ole Einar Bjørndalen. Though he incurred a penalty loop, he made up two places over his leg, and good work by Andresen and Bjørndalen secured the gold.

During the off-season, Sjåstad Christiansen participated in the Junior Norwegian Summer Championships, in the age group for 18-year-olds. He won silver in the sprint and gold in the pursuit. When the winter came, Sjåstad Christiansen debuted at the Junior/Youth World Championships in 2010 in Torsby, competing in the youth class. The first event was the 12.5 km individual on 27 January, in which he received three penalty minutes but still won bronze. Three days later, Sjåstad Christiansen won another bronze, this time in the 7.5 km sprint. The next day, Sjåstad Christiansen fell two places and finished fifth. Two days later, Sjåstad Christiansen raced in the 3 × 7.5 km relay, taking the anchor leg. Sjåstad Christiansen started his leg in third position and kept that position until the end, and the team thus won bronze. Later in February, Sjåstad Christiansen participated in the Junior Norwegian Championships. He won gold in the individual, came fourth in the sprint, and won silver in the relay. At the end of the season, Sjåstad Christiansen participated in the Norwegian Championships at Simostranda. He did not race in the individual, but came 11th in the sprint and 13th in the mass start. In the relay, Sjåstad Christiansen took the first leg for the first team of Buskerud. He changed in third, but a total of five penalty loops by his teammates, Anders Brun Hennum, Bache and Andresen, meant they finished in fifth.

In September 2010, Sjåstad Christiansen competed in the Junior Norwegian Summer Championships in the age group for 19-year-olds. He came second in both the sprint and pursuit. In January 2011, Sjåstad Christiansen again competed in the Junior/Youth World Championships, this time in Nové Město, competing in the youth class. The first event was the 7.5 km sprint on 29 January, in which he received two penalties and won silver. The following day, Sjåstad Christiansen started eighteen seconds behind Maxim Tsvetkov. He missed four times but still won silver, thirty seconds behind Tsvetkov. Two days later, Sjåstad Christiansen raced in the 12.5 km individual in which he incurred three penalty minutes, and yet won bronze. Norway did not participate in the relay in the youth category, but Sjåstad Christiansen was selected for team that raced in the junior category. Sjåstad Christiansen took the anchor leg. At the exchange, the Norwegians were in third position, Sjåstad Christiansen defended that position, and the Norwegians won bronze. In March, Sjåstad Christiansen participated Junior Norwegian Championships. He won gold in the individual, came sixth in the sprint, but returned to the top of the podium in the relay. At the end of the season, Sjåstad Christiansen participated in the 2011 Norwegian Championships. He again skipped the individual, but came 13th in the sprint and 8th in the pursuit. In the relay, he again took the first leg and changed in fourth place. Fast skiing and good shooting by his teammates, Andresen, Hennum, and the returning Bjørndalen, meant that the team from Buskerud again won gold, more than two minutes ahead of second place.

In September 2011, Sjåstad Christiansen competed in the Junior Norwegian Summer Championships in the age group for 20- and 21-year-olds. He came eighth in the sprint but climbed to claim gold in the pursuit. In January 2012, Sjåstad Christiansen debuted in the Junior European Championships in Brezno-Osrblie. In the first event, the 10 km sprint on 27 January, he missed once but still won gold, just one second ahead of Alexandr Loginov. Two days later, Sjåstad Christiansen won silver in the 12.5 km pursuit, 23.5 seconds behind Loginov, despite both having missed twice. The next event was the mixed relay in which Sjåstad Christiansen took the anchor leg. The Norwegians led at the last exchange, and as Sjåstad Christiansen needed only two spare rounds to clear the targets, they won gold. He also participated in the last event, the 15 km individual. He missed twice but still won bronze, thanks to quick ski speed. Sjåstad Christiansen competed in the Junior/Youth World Championships in 2012 as well, this time in Kontiolahti, competing in the junior category. The first event was the 15 km individual on 21 February. He skied quickly but missed six times and finished 16th. Two days later, Sjåstad Christiansen raced in the relay, once again taking the anchor leg. The Norwegian team led the race at the last exchange, Sjåstad Christiansen defended their lead, and the Norwegians won gold. The next race, two days later, was the 10 km sprint. Sjåstad Christiansen missed twice and finished 13th. Sjåstad Christiansen skied better in the pursuit the following day, where he missed twice but climbed eleven places to win silver just ahead of Alexandr Loginov, and over one minute and forty seconds behind the sprint winner Tsvetkov. In March, Sjåstad Christiansen raced in the Junior Norwegian Championships, winning silver in the individual and gold in the sprint and finishing fourth in the relay. At the season's end, Sjåstad Christiansen participated in the Norwegian Championships in Trondheim. He came 13th in the 20 km individual and 9th in the 10 km sprint but skipped the mass start. He then took the anchor leg in the relay. Andresen, Tommi Luchsinger, and Erlend Bjøntegaard had pulled Buskerud I into fourth position, and Sjåstad Christiansen was the fastest in his leg, pulling them into second, winning silver.

In September 2012, Sjåstad Christiansen competed at the Norwegian Summer Biathlon Championships in Holmenkollen for the first time in the senior group. He impressed by winning bronze, just 6.8 seconds behind Lars Berger, who won silver and one minute and ten seconds behind Bjørndalen. Sjåstad Christiansen won another bronze the next day, though the gap to Berger and Bjørndalen had grown to 18 seconds, and two minutes and 49 seconds, respectively. In the first round of the 2012–13 World Cup, on 1 December 2012, Sjåstad Christiansen made his World Cup debut. The race was the 10 km sprint, and he missed twice and finished 27th, 1 minute and 18 seconds behind the winner, the Canadian Jean-Philippe Leguellec, qualifying for the pursuit the following day. Over the rest of the season, he would race in ten more races breaking three more barriers. First, in Hochfilzen in his fifth World Cup race and first relay, Sjåstad Christiansen also won his first relay. He raced alongside fellow newcomers Lars Helge Birkeland and Henrik L'Abée-Lund, both having clocked in less than twenty World Cup races, and the veteran Ole Einar Bjørndalen, who had raced more than 460 World Cup races. Birkeland shot fast and cleanly in the first leg to hand over to Bjørndalen just 9.8 seconds behind, in fourth place. Bjørndalen would require only one spare round, which, combined with his swift shooting and skiing, brought the Norwegians the lead. At the second exchange, Bjørndalen handed over to Sjåstad Christiansen, 6.0 seconds ahead of the Czech Republic. Sjåstad Christiansen skied fast and shot cleanly, and this, combined with mistakes by other teams, increased the lead to 47.0 seconds. L'Abée-Lund took the anchor leg. Also, he shot fast and cleanly, compensating in large part for his skiing speed. The Norwegians won 34.5 seconds ahead of France in second and 46.6 seconds ahead of Russia in third.

Sjåstad Christiansen participated only briefly in the Junior/Youth World Championships in 2013 in Obertilliach. The championships started for Sjåstad Christiansen with the 10 km sprint event. He shot cleanly, but he finished outside the podium in fourth position. He did not start in the pursuit, nor did he enter any more events in the championships. Sjåstad Christiansen participated in the European Championships the following month. In the first race, Sjåstad Christiansen and his fellow Norwegians were not acclimatized. Thus, Sjåstad Christiansen finished 18th in the 20 km individual, despite missing only once. The next race, the 10 km sprint, was postponed twice due to heavy fog, giving the Norwegians two extra days to acclimatize. This allowed Sjåstad Christiansen to pick up his pace and win the gold in the sprint, shooting clear. The pursuit competition crashed with the men's relay, with the result being that the relay was cancelled. Sjåstad Christiansen won silver in the pursuit, having missed three times, the same amount as the winner, Benedikt Doll.

The second barrier Sjåstad Christiansen broke in the World Cup was finishing in the top ten in an individual race. That race was the season's last sprint in Khanty-Mansiysk. Sjåstad Christiansen shot cleanly and finished tenth, one minute and four seconds behind the winner, Martin Fourcade. This result, alongside the 11th-place finish in the pursuit, qualified Sjåstad Christiansen for his first mass start in the World Cup, breaking another barrier. The season was thus a remarkable success, with Sjåstad Christiansen mostly finishing in the top 30 individually, and finished 43rd overall in the World Cup. The season ended with the Norwegian Championships in Dombås. Sjåstad Christiansen came tenth in the individual, having missed five times, and fifth in the sprint despite having missed four times. Sjåstad Christiansen then came fourth in the pursuit, having lost the bronze in a sprint finish with Lars Berger. In the relay, he took the anchor leg, lifting the team from Buskerud from sixth to third, winning bronze.

=== Olympic season (2013–14 World Cup season) ===
On 3 April 2013, Sjåstad Christiansen was selected to the elite team for the first time, being selected alongside Ole Einar Bjørndalen, Johannes Thingnes Bø, Tarjei Bø, fellow newcomer Henrik L'Abée-Lund, and Emil Hegle Svendsen. At the Norwegian Summer Championships in Mo i Rana, Sjåstad Christiansen won silver in both the sprint and pursuit, behind Svendsen in the sprint and Bjørndalen in the pursuit. In November, Sjåstad Christiansen participated in the traditional qualifying races at Sjusjøen. Sjåstad Christiansen finished a disappointing 32nd in the 10 km sprint, but secured World Cup participation by coming second in the 15 km mass start, just 4.9 seconds behind Bjørndalen. Sjåstad Christiansen helped the Norwegians finish in second place in the opening mixed relay of the season in Östersund. In the individual and sprint, he came 16th and 29th, being the best Norwegian in the individual. In Hochfilzen, he performed badly in the sprint, missing three times and finishing 53rd. He was nevertheless given the first leg in the relay the next day. He skied fast but needed four spare rounds and changed 31.4 seconds behind the leader. However, Bjørndalen claimed the lead on the second leg, and Tarjei Bø and Svendsen defended that lead, meaning that Sjåstad Christiansen got his second relay victory. The following day, Sjåstad Christiansen climbed more than twenty places, finishing 31st. He skipped the third round of the World Cup but competed in the fourth round, finishing 15th in the sprint, his best individual finish of the season. He faltered in the pursuit, however, and finished 35th. He was not qualified for the mass start, and his next competition was the relay in Ruhpolding. However, Johannes Thingnes Bø incurred three penalty loops on the first leg and changed to his brother in 22nd place. Tarjei Bø climbed to 14th, and Sjåstad Christiansen raced a decent leg, climbing to 10th. Svendsen then secured the Norwegians a ninth place. In the following 20 km individual, Sjåstad Christiansen shot well but skied rather slowly and finished 56th and decided not to start in the pursuit. He was nevertheless selected for the Olympic squad, albeit as a reserve for the relay, fulfilling his long-term goal. He did not race in Antholz-Anterselva, and did not get to race in any races at the Olympics. In Pokljuka, in the first World Cup round after the Olympics, Sjåstad Christiansen finished 64th in the 10 km sprint and thus did not qualify for the pursuit. He was not qualified for the mass start either. He did not race in the next round of the World Cup but returned for the last round of races at Holmenkollen. There, he finished 41st in both the sprint and the pursuit. To end the season Sjåstad Christiansen participated in the 2014 Norwegian Championships. In the 20 km individual and the 10 km sprint, Sjåstad Christiansen came 7th, winning silver in the 15 km mass start. In the relay, the Buskerud team suffered in the absence of the ill Bjørndalen and the retired Andresen, and finished sixth.

=== Stagnation and illness (2014–15 World Cup season) ===
Sjåstad Christiansen was reselected before the 2014–15 season, the whole team being reselected. In September, Sjåstad Christiansen competed at the Norwegian Summer Championships in Steinkjer. There, he came sixth in both the sprint and the pursuit. At the season start races at Sjusjøen, Vetle came third in the sprint but came 17th in the mass start. He was selected for the mixed relay and individual in Östersund, with a chance of getting the last place in the sprint. In the mixed relay, Sjåstad Christiansen again helped the Norwegians to a second-place finish. In the individual, he finished a disappointing 53rd but was still given the last spot in the sprint due to Lars Helge Birkeland finishing 84th. In the sprint, Sjåstad Christiansen finished 45th despite missing only once, but he climbed thirty places in the pursuit by being the only one to hit all twenty targets, and finished 15th. Sjåstad Christiansen's results in Östersund were below expectations, and he was not selected for the second round of the World Cup. He returned in the last round before the Christmas break and delivered better results by finishing 30th in the sprint and 39th in the pursuit. However, he was not selected for the World Cups in Oberhof and Ruhpolding, but after both Tarjei Bø and Emil Hegle Svendsen fell ill, he was needed for the relay and sprint in Oberhof. He took the first leg in the relay, changing in fourth place. The rest of the team, Alexander Os, Johannes Thingnes Bø, and Ole Einar Bjørndalen, gained the lead, but victory was snatched in a sprint finish with Anton Shipulin, and so the Norwegians finished second. Sjåstad Christiansen finished 67th in the sprint and decided to return to Norway for a medical examination, having been feeling tired for some time. It was revealed that he had been affected in some way by the Rhinovirus, but he remained unable to compete and train properly for the next six months.

=== Leaving the national team (2015–16 World Cup season) ===
Due to his illness, he left the national biathlon team ahead of the 2015–16 season and joined a private biathlon team called Team Norgesbakeriet. The team was composed of Vetle Ravnsborg Gurigard, Kristoffer Langøien Skjelvik, Håkon Svaland, Martin Eng, Tore Leren and Sjåstad Christiansen, with Knut Tore Berland as coach. He did not participate in the 2015 Norwegian Summer Championships.

== Biathlon results ==
All results are sourced from the International Biathlon Union.

=== Olympic Games ===
4 medals (1 gold, 2 silver, 1 bronze)

Event	Individual	Sprint	Pursuit	Mass start	Relay	Mixed relay
(China) 2022 Beijing	13th	20th	15th	Bronze	Gold	—
(Italy) 2026 Milano Cortina	—	Silver	5th	5th	Silver	4th

=== World Championships ===
8 medals (3 gold, 3 silver, 2 bronze)

Event	Individual	Sprint	Pursuit	Mass start	Relay	Mixed relay	Single mixed relay
(Sweden) 2019 Östersund	8th	31st	23rd	12th	Gold	Gold	—
(Italy) 2020 Antholz-Anterselva	62nd	33rd	10th	13th	Silver	—	—
(Slovenia) 2021 Pokljuka	—	—	—	16th	Gold	—	—
(Germany) 2023 Oberhof	10th	6th	5th	12th	Silver	—	—
(Czech Republic) 2024 Nové Město	16th	Bronze	Bronze	8th	Silver	—	—

*During Olympic seasons competitions are only held for those events not included in the Olympic program.

=== Junior/Youth World Championships ===
9 medals (1 gold, 3 silver, 5 bronze)

Event	Individual	Sprint	Pursuit	Relay
(Sweden) 2010 Torsby	Bronze	Bronze	5th	Bronze
(Czech Republic) 2011 Nové Město	Bronze	Silver	Silver	Bronze
(Finland) 2012 Kontiolahti	16th	13th	Silver	Gold
(Austria) 2013 Obertilliach	—	4th	DNS	—

=== Biathlon World Cup ===
==== Season standings ====
Season	Age	Overall	Individual	Sprint	Pursuit	Mass start
2012–13	20	42	—	37	37	37
2013–14	21	53	31	51	62	—
2014–15	22	67	—	76	52	—
2015–16	23	100	—	86	—	—
2016–17	24	45	—	46	38	—
2017–18	25	54	53	70	51	39
2018–19	26	13	2	15	13	7
2019–20	27	10	25	12	8	7
2020–21	28	13	28	13	14	10
2021–22	29	4	9	5	5	3
2022–23	30	3	1	5	6	1
2023–24	31	5	5	9	8	3
2024–25	32	30	35	30	34	22
2025–26	33	7	8	9	12	5

==== Individual victories (7) ====
Season	Date	Location	Discipline
2018–19	15 February 2019	(United States) Soldier Hollow	10 km Sprint
2021–22	5 December 2021	(Sweden) Östersund	12.5 km Pursuit
2021–22	12 March 2022	(Estonia) Otepää	15 km Mass Start
2022–23	12 March 2023	(Sweden) Östersund	15 km Mass Start
2023–24	13 January 2024	(Germany) Ruhpolding	10 km Sprint
2023–24	21 January 2024	(Italy) Antholz-Anterselva	15 km Mass Start
2025–26	19 December 2025	(France) Le Grand-Bornand	10 km Sprint
