= Patrick Braunhofer =

Italian biathlete (born 1998)

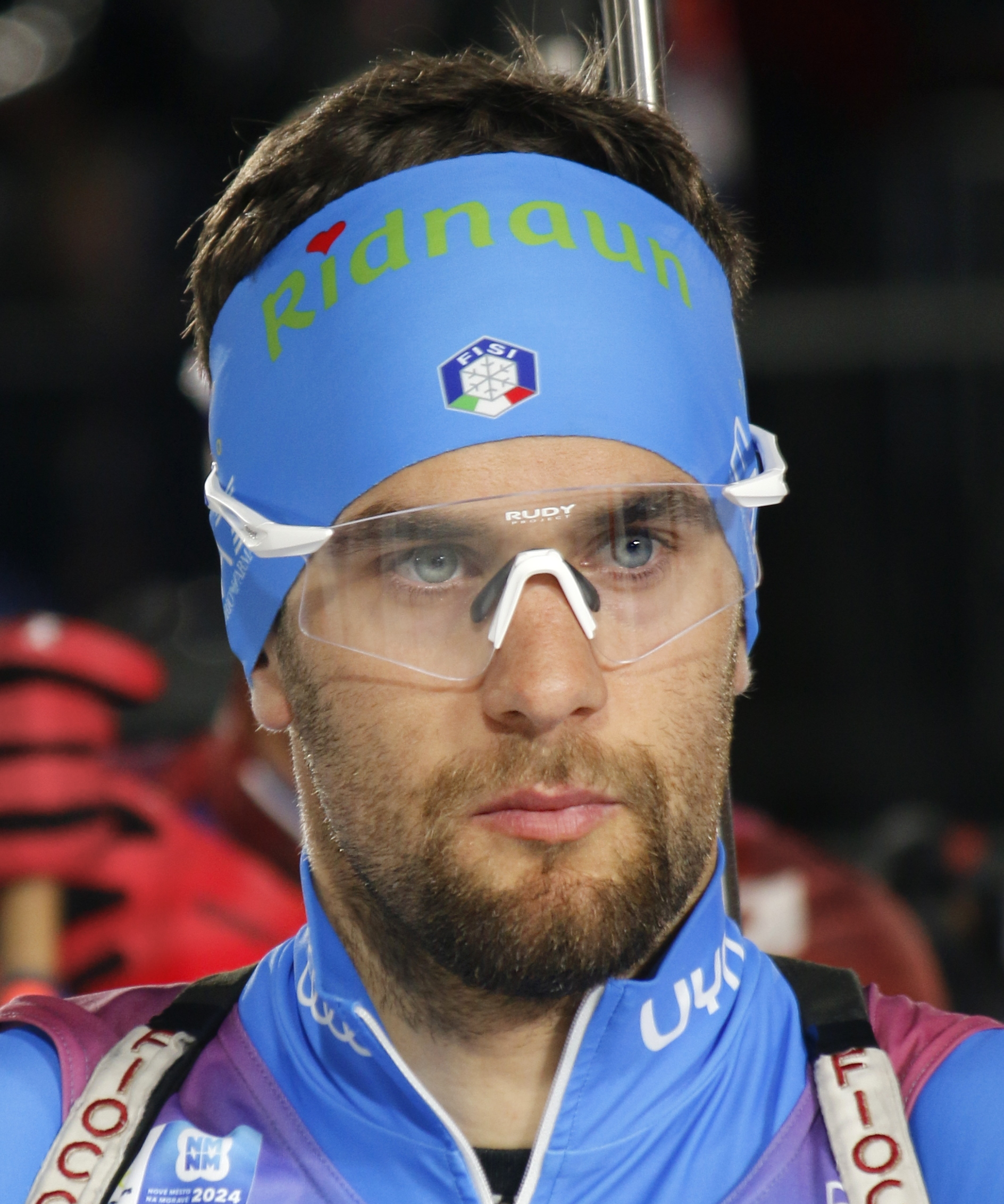
- Braunhofer in 2024

Personal information
- Nationality: Italian
- Born: 19 April 1998 (age 28) Cavalese, Italy

Sport
- Country: Italy
- Sport: Biathlon
Medal record
Men's biathlon
Representing Italy
European Championships
Gold medal – first place	2025 Val Martello	12.5 km pursuit
Winter Youth Olympics
Bronze medal – third place	2016 Lillehammer	Mixed Relay
Junior World Championships
Bronze medal – third place	2019 Osrblie	4 × 7.5 km Relay

Patrick Braunhofer (born 19 April 1998) is an Italian biathlete. He has competed in the World Cup since 2019.

== Career ==
Braunhofer, originally from Val Ridanna and active since the 2015–2016 season, made his World Cup debut on 17 January 2019, in Ruhpolding in the sprint event and took 87th place. At the subsequent 2019 Junior World Championships in Osrblie, he won the bronze medal in the relay. At the 2023 Oberhof World Championships, his first appearance at the senior level, he finished 50th in the sprint and 46th in the pursuit. At the 2024 Nové Město na Moravě World Championships, he placed 52nd in the sprint and 48th in the pursuit. On 8 March 2024, he achieved his first podium in the World Cup with a 2nd-place finish in the relay at Soldier Hollow.

== Biathlon results ==
All results are sourced from the International Biathlon Union.

=== World Championships ===
0 medals

Event	Individual	Sprint	Pursuit	Mass start	Relay	Mixed relay	Single mixed relay
(Germany) 2023 Oberhof	DNS	50th	46th	—	—	—	—
(Czech Republic) 2024 Nové Město	—	52nd	48th	—	—	—	—

=== World Cup ===
Season	Overall			Individual		Sprint		Pursuit		Mass start	
Season	Races	Points	Position	Points	Position	Points	Position	Points	Position	Points	Position
2018–19	1/25	Didn't earn World Cup points									
2020–21	4/26	Didn't earn World Cup points									
2022–23	10/21	55	54th	39	27th	5	81st	5	73rd	6	44th
2023–24	15/21	64	49th	5	59th	26	52nd	33	42nd	—	—
