= Jakub Štvrtecký =

Czech biathlete (born 1998)

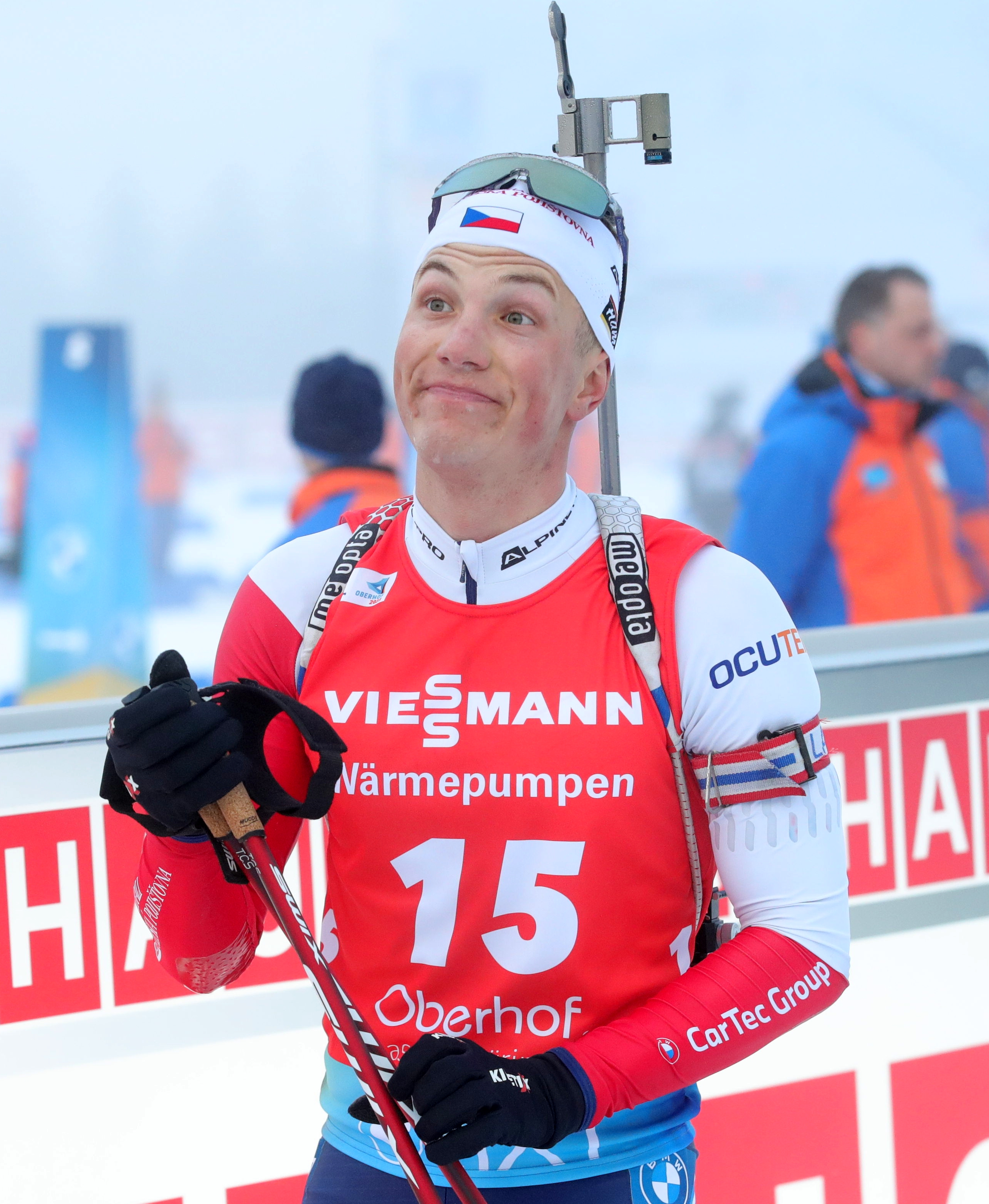
- Štvrtecký in 2023

Personal information
- Nationality: Czech
- Born: 21 December 1998 (age 27) Vsetín, Czech Republic

Sport
- Country: Czech Republic
- Sport: Biathlon
Medal record
Men's biathlon
Representing Czech Republic
Junior World Championships
Silver medal – second place	2020 Lenzerheide	10 km Sprint

Jakub Štvrtecký (born 21 December 1998) is a Czech biathlete. He made his debut in the Biathlon World Cup in 2018.

== Career ==
He made his international debut in 2016, at the World Youth Championships in Cheile Gradistei, where his best result was seventh in the sprint. The following season, he claimed a podium finish in the relay at the IBU Junior Cup. In 2018, he was sixth in the individual at the Junior World Championships in Otepää, then, a few months later at the Junior Summer Biathlon World Championships, he won the titles in the sprint and mixed relay.

In 2018–2019, he made his senior debut at the IBU Cup, then at the World Cup in Hochfilzen, before being selected for the World Championships in Östersund.

At the opening 2019-2020 World Cup event, he managed to score points with his 39th-place finish in the Östersund sprint. He then broke into the top thirty at Hochfilzen (29th), before breaking into the top twenty at Le Grand-Bornand, where he finished sixteenth in the sprint. His other highlight of the winter was a silver medal at the Junior World Championships in Lenzerheide in the sprint.

In 2024, he won gold at the Summer Biathlon World Championships in Otepää.

== Biathlon results ==
All results are sourced from the International Biathlon Union.

=== Olympic Games ===
Event	Individual	Sprint	Pursuit	Mass start	Relay	Mixed relay
(China) 2022 Beijing	65th	58th	48th	—	19th	—

=== World Championships ===
Event	Individual	Sprint	Pursuit	Mass start	Relay	Mixed relay
(Sweden) 2019 Östersund	—	65th	—	—	—	—
(Italy) 2020 Antholz-Anterselva	70th	47th	54th	13th	—	—
(Slovenia) 2021 Pokljuka	78th	67th	—	13th	—	—
(Germany) 2023 Oberhof	65th	15th	22st	22nd	4th	—
(Czech Republic) 2024 Nové Město	63rd	41st	47th	—	—	—
