= Anton Vidmar =

Slovenian biathlete (born 2000)

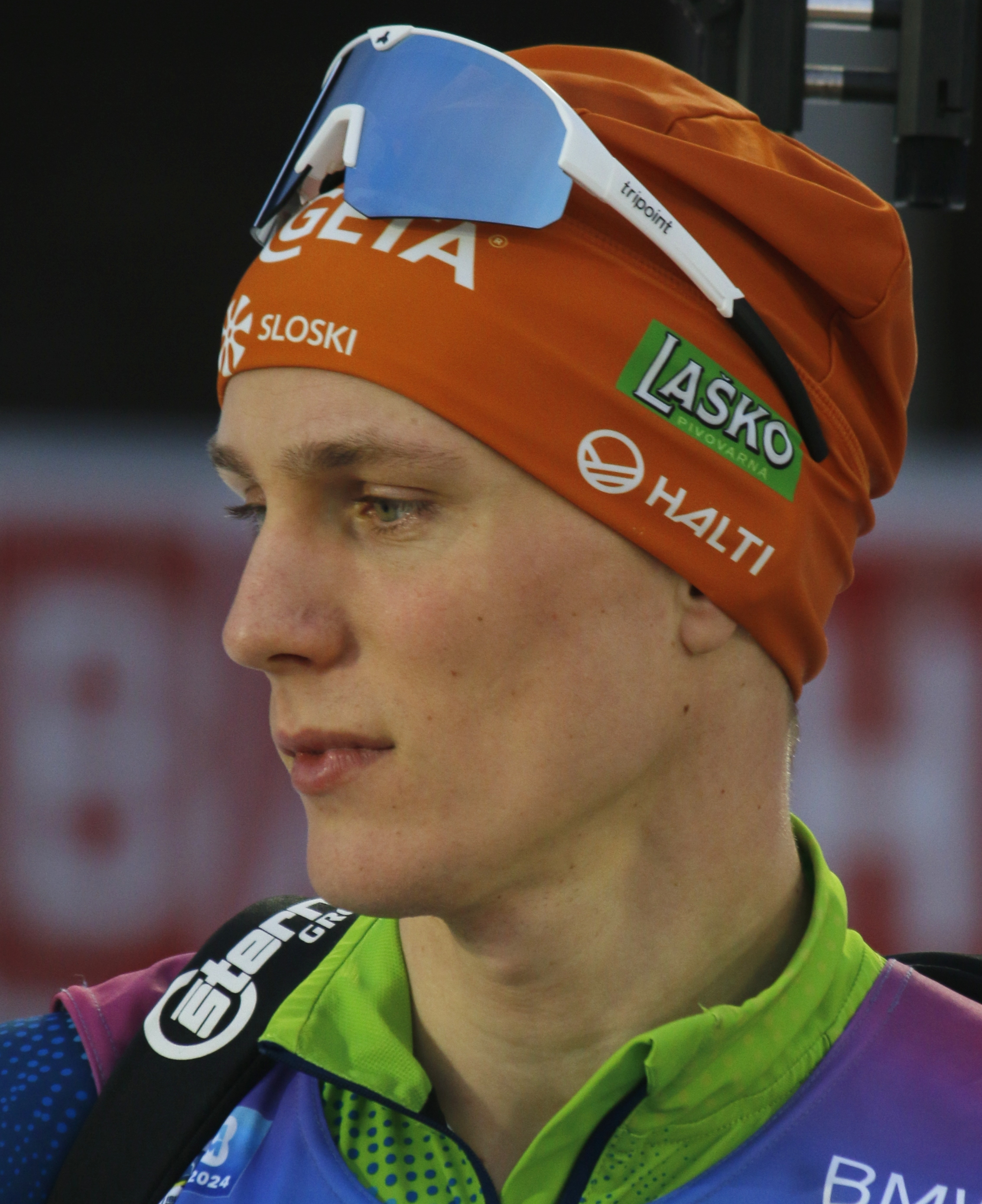
- Vidmar in 2025

Personal information
- Nationality: Slovenian
- Born: 17 February 2000 (age 26) Ljubljana, Slovenia

Sport
- Country: Slovenia
- Sport: Biathlon
Medal record
Men's biathlon
Representing Slovenia
Youth World Championships
Silver medal – second place	2019 Osrblie	3 x 7,5 km relay

Anton Vidmar (born 17 February 2000) is a Slovenian biathlete who has competed in the Biathlon World Cup since 2021. He was selected to participate in the 2026 Olympic Games.

He is a silver medalist in the men's relay at the 2019 Youth World Championships, together with Lovro Planko and Alex Cisar.

== Biathlon results ==
All results are sourced from the International Biathlon Union.

=== Olympic Games ===
0 medal

Event	Individual	Sprint	Pursuit	Mass start	Relay	Mixed relay
(Italy) 2026 Milano Cortina	—	—	—	—	—	13th

=== World Championships ===
0 medal

Event	Individual	Sprint	Pursuit	Mass start	Relay	Mixed relay	Single mixed relay
(Germany) 2023 Oberhof	33rd	43rd	26th	—	9th	—	—
(Czech Republic) 2024 Nove Mesto	60th	47th	46th	—	11th	—	—
(Switzerland) 2025 Lenzerheide	37th	54th	42nd	—	13th	—	—
