= 2022–23 Biathlon World Cup – Relay Women =

The 2022–23 Biathlon World Cup – Relay Women started on 1 December 2022 in Kontiolahti and will conclude on 11 March 2023 in Östersund.

== Competition format ==
The relay teams consist of four biathletes. Every athlete's leg is skied over three 2.5 kilometres (1.6 mi) laps for a total of 7.5 kilometres (4.7 mi), with two shooting rounds: one prone and one standing. For every round of five targets there are eight bullets available, though the last three can only be single-loaded manually from the spare round holders or from bullets deposited by the athlete into trays or onto the mat at the firing line. If after eight bullets there are still standing targets, one 150 metres (490 ft) penalty loop must be taken for each remaining target. The first-leg participants start all at the same time, and as in cross-country skiing relays, every athlete of a team must touch the team's next-leg participant to perform a valid changeover. On the first shooting stage of the first leg, the participant must shoot in the lane corresponding to their bib number (bib #10 shoots at lane #10 regardless of their position in the race), then for the remainder of the relay, the athletes shoot at the lane corresponding to the position they arrived (arrive at the range in 5th place, shoot at lane five).

== 2022–23 Top 3 standings ==
Medal	Athlete	Points
Gold:	Sweden	276
Silver:	France	270
Bronze:	Germany	260

== Events summary ==
Event	Gold	Time	Silver	Time	Bronze	Time
Kontiolahti details	Sweden; Linn Persson; Anna Magnusson; Hanna Öberg; Elvira Öberg	1:14:59.8 (0+0) (0+1) (0+0) (0+1) (0+2) (0+2) (0+0) (0+0)	Germany; Anna Weidel; Sophia Schneider; Vanessa Voigt; Denise Herrmann-Wick	1:15:27.9 (0+0) (0+0) (0+1) (0+1) (0+1) (0+1) (0+1) (0+1)	Norway; Karoline Offigstad Knotten; Ida Lien; Ragnhild Femsteinveik; Ingrid Landmark Tandrevold	1:15:31.3 (0+1) (0+0) (0+0) (0+1) (0+0) (0+0) (0+0) (0+1)
Hochfilzen details	France; Lou Jeanmonnot; Anaïs Chevalier-Bouchet; Chloé Chevalier; Julia Simon	1:14:27.1 (0+1) (0+0) (0+0) (0+2) (0+0) (0+1) (0+0) (0+0)	Sweden; Linn Persson; Anna Magnusson; Hanna Öberg; Elvira Öberg	1:14:37.5 (0+0) (0+0) (0+2) (0+0) (0+3) (0+2) (0+1) (0+1)	Italy; Rebecca Passler; Dorothea Wierer; Samuela Comola; Lisa Vittozzi	1:14:45.6 (0+0) (0+0) (0+0) (0+0) (0+0) (0+1) (0+2) (0+1)
Ruhpolding details	Norway; Karoline Offigstad Knotten; Ragnhild Femsteinveik; Marte Olsbu Røiseland; Ingrid Landmark Tandrevold	1:08:17.3 (0+0) (0+0) (0+3) (0+3) (0+0) (0+0) (0+0) (0+0)	Germany; Anna Weidel; Sophia Schneider; Vanessa Voigt; Denise Herrmann-Wick	1:08:32.6 (0+3) (0+1) (0+0) (0+0) (0+2) (0+2) (0+1) (0+1)	Italy; Samuela Comola; Lisa Vittozzi; Rebecca Passler; Dorothea Wierer	1:08:50.8 (0+0) (0+0) (0+0) (0+2) (0+1) (0+0) (0+0) (0+1)
Antholz-Anterselva details	France; Lou Jeanmonnot; Anaïs Chevalier-Bouchet; Chloé Chevalier; Julia Simon	1:07:21.3 (0+0) (0+1) (0+1) (0+0) (0+0) (0+0) (0+0) (0+0)	Sweden; Linn Persson; Anna Magnusson; Hanna Öberg; Elvira Öberg	1:08:06.5 (0+1) (0+0) (0+3) (0+0) (0+1) (0+0) (0+0) (0+3)	Germany; Vanessa Voigt; Sophia Schneider; Janina Hettich-Walz; Hanna Kebinger	1:08:38.2 (0+0) (0+2) (0+1) (0+2) (0+1) (0+1) (0+2) (0+1)
Östersund						

== Standings ==
Intermediate standings after 4 competitions.

#	Name	KON	HOC	RUH	ANT	OST	Total
1.	Sweden	90	75	36	75		276
2.	France	50	90	40	90		270
3.	Germany	75	50	75	60		260
4.	Norway	60	45	90	40		235
5.	Italy	32	60	60	50		202
6.	Switzerland	45	40	50	36		171
7.	Czech Republic	40	36	45	31		152
8.	Austria	34	32	32	45		143
9.	Finland	36	28	31	30		125
10.	Estonia	31	31	34	22		118
11.	Canada	27	27	29	34		117
12.	Ukraine	26	29	30	32		117
13.	United States	30	26	28	28		112
14.	Slovakia	28	30	27	27		112
15.	Poland	29	25	25	26		105
16.	Bulgaria	25	23	26	23		97
17.	Slovenia	–	34	24	29		87
17.	Romania	DSQ	24	22	25		71
19.	Japan	–	–	23	DNS		23
20.	Kazakhstan	–	22	–	–		22
