= 2022–23 Biathlon World Cup – Individual Women =

2022–23 Biathlon World Cup Women's Individual standings

The 2022–23 Biathlon World Cup – Individual Women started on 30 November 2022 in Kontiolahti and will conclude on 9 March 2023 in Östersund.

== Competition format ==
The individual race is the oldest biathlon event; the distance is skied over five laps. The biathlete shoots four times at any shooting lane, in the order of prone, standing, prone, standing, totalling 20 targets. Competitors' starts are staggered, normally by 30 seconds. The distance skied is usually 20 kilometres (12.4 mi) with a fixed penalty time of one minute per missed target that is added to the skiing time of the biathlete. In the "Short Individual" the distance is 15 kilometres (9.3 mi) with a penalty time of 45 seconds per missed target.

== 2022–23 Top 3 standings ==
Medal	Athlete	Points
Gold:	(Italy) Lisa Vittozzi	150
Silver:	(Sweden) Hanna Öberg	135
Bronze:	(Norway) Ingrid Landmark Tandrevold	111

== Events summary ==
Event	Gold	Time	Silver	Time	Bronze	Time
Kontiolahti details	Hanna Öberg; Sweden	43:53.8 (0+0+0+1)	Ingrid Landmark Tandrevold; Norway	44:30.3 (0+0+0+0)	Lisa Vittozzi; Italy	44:33.5 (1+0+0+0)
Ruhpolding details	Lisa Vittozzi; Italy	40:05.9 (0+0+0+0)	Lou Jeanmonnot; France	40:44.9 (0+0+0+0)	Julia Simon; France	40:51.1 (0+0+0+1)
Östersund details	Dorothea Wierer; Italy	41:19.6 (0+0+0+0)	Lisa Vittozzi; Italy	41:45.1 (0+0+0+0)	Denise Herrmann-Wick; Germany	42:58.4 (1+0+0+0)

== Standings ==
Intermediate standings after 3 competitions.

#	Name	KON	RUH	OST	Total
1.	Lisa Vittozzi (ITA)	60	90	75	225
2.	Julia Simon (FRA)	45	60	50	155
3.	Hanna Öberg (SWE)	90	45	18	153
4.	Ingrid Landmark Tandrevold (NOR)	75	36	36	147
5.	Dorothea Wierer (ITA)	3	50	90	143
6.	Lou Jeanmonnot (FRA)	29	75	25	129
7.	Denise Herrmann-Wick (GER)	40	26	60	126
8.	Vanessa Voigt (GER)	50	30	40	120
9.	Elvira Öberg (SWE)	32	40	21	93
10.	Markéta Davidová (CZE)	36	23	28	87
11.	Chloé Chevalier (FRA)	23	25	34	82
12.	Karoline Offigstad Knotten (NOR)	14	28	32	74
13.	Emma Lunder (CAN)	21	0	45	66
14.	Paulína Fialková (SVK)	34	31	0	65
15.	Anna Magnusson (SWE)	25	22	16	63
16.	Anaïs Chevalier-Bouchet (FRA)	11	18	29	58
17.	Polona Klemenčič (SLO)	22	–	31	53
18.	Amy Baserga (SUI)	5	17	22	44
19.	Lena Häcki-Groß (SUI)	0	24	19	43
20.	Caroline Colombo (FRA)	17	11	14	42
21.	Lisa Theresa Hauser (AUT)	9	32	0	41
22.	Tamara Steiner (AUT)	–	19	20	39
23.	Sophia Schneider (GER)	30	8	DNS	38
24.	Marte Olsbu Røiseland (NOR)	–	34	0	34
25.	Janina Hettich-Walz (GER)	–	15	17	32
26.	Lotte Lie (BEL)	31	DNS	0	31
27.	Tuuli Tomingas (EST)	0	5	26	31
28.	Dunja Zdouc (AUT)	8	0	23	31
29.	Hanna Kebinger (GER)	–	–	30	30
30.	Alina Stremous (MDA)	0	29	0	29
#	Name	KON	RUH	OST	Total
31.	Linn Persson (SWE)	28	DNS	0	28
32.	Jessica Jislová (CZE)	0	27	0	27
33.	Elisa Gasparin (SUI)	27	0	0	27
34.	Juni Arnekleiv (NOR)	–	–	27	27
35.	Aita Gasparin (SUI)	20	0	7	27
36.	Nastassia Kinnunen (FIN)	26	0	0	26
37.	Yuliia Dzhima (UKR)	DNS	21	4	25
38.	Mari Eder (FIN)	24	0	0	24
39.	Hannah Auchentaller (ITA)	–	–	24	24
40.	Juliane Frühwirt (GER)	18	6	–	24
41.	Nadia Moser (CAN)	10	0	13	23
42.	Anna Juppe (AUT)	0	16	5	21
43.	Ukaleq Astri Slettemark (GRL)	–	20	–	20
44.	Fuyuko Tachizaki (JPN)	7	2	11	20
45.	Tereza Voborníková (CZE)	19	0	0	19
46.	Anna Weidel (GER)	15	4	0	19
47.	Deedra Irwin (USA)	16	0	0	16
48.	Lucie Charvátová (CZE)	0	1	15	16
49.	Samuela Comola (ITA)	0	14	2	16
50.	Joanna Jakiela (POL)	13	0	0	13
51.	Milena Todorova (BUL)	0	13	DNS	13
52.	Anastasiya Merkushyna (UKR)	–	10	3	13
53.	Rebecca Passler (ITA)	–	–	12	12
54.	Susan Külm (EST)	0	12	0	12
55.	Johanna Skottheim (SWE)	12	–	–	12
56.	Ivona Fialkova (SVK)	–	–	10	10
57.	Suvi Minkkinen (FIN)	1	9	–	10
58.	Olena Bilosiuk (UKR)	0	–	9	9
59.	Ella Halvarsson (SWE)	–	–	8	8
60.	Federica Sanfilippo (ITA)	–	7	–	7
#	Name	KON	RUH	OST	Total
61.	Ekaterina Avvakumova (KOR)	–	0	6	6
62.	Paula Botet (FRA)	6	–	–	6
63.	Sophie Chauveau (FRA)	4	0	–	4
64.	Ragnhild Femsteinevik (NOR)	0	3	0	3
65.	Eliška Václavíková (CZE)	2	–	–	2
66.	Mona Brorsson (SWE)	–	0	1	1
