= 2022–23 Biathlon World Cup – Mass start Women =

2022–23 Biathlon World Cup Women's Mass Start standings

The 2022–23 Biathlon World Cup – Mass Start Women started on 18 December 2022 in Annecy-Le Grand-Bornand and will conclude on 19 March 2023 in Oslo Holmenkollen.

== Competition format ==
In the mass start, all biathletes start at the same time and the first across the finish line wins. In this 15 kilometres (9.3 mi) competition, the distance is skied over five laps; there are four bouts of shooting (two prone and two standing, in that order) with the first shooting bout being at the lane corresponding to the competitor's bib number (bib #10 shoots at lane #10 regardless of position in race), with the rest of the shooting bouts being on a first-come, first-served basis (if a competitor arrives at the lane in fifth place, they shoot at lane 5). As in the sprint and pursuit, competitors must ski one 150 metres (490 ft) penalty loop for each miss. Here again, to avoid unwanted congestion, World Cup Mass starts are held with only the 30 top ranking athletes on the start line (half that of the pursuit) as here all contestants start simultaneously.

== 2022–23 Top 3 standings ==
Medal	Athlete	Points
Gold:	(France) Julia Simon	165
Silver:	(Austria) Lisa Theresa Hauser	126
Bronze:	(France) Anaïs Chevalier-Bouchet	120

== Events summary ==
Event	Gold	Time	Silver	Time	Bronze	Time
Annecy-Le Grand-Bornand details	Lisa Theresa Hauser; Austria	33:54.1 (0+0+1+0)	Julia Simon; France	34:06.4 (0+1+1+0)	Anaïs Chevalier-Bouchet; France	34:08.4 (0+0+0+1)
Ruhpolding details	Julia Simon; France	32:52.0 (1+0+1+1)	Lisa Vittozzi; Italy	32:54.6 (0+0+1+0)	Anaïs Chevalier-Bouchet; France	32:58.7 (0+1+0+0)
Östersund						
Oslo Holmenkollen						

== Standings ==
Intermediate standings after 2 competitions.

#	Name	LGB	RUH	OST	OSL	Total
1.	Julia Simon (FRA)	75	90			165
2.	Lisa Theresa Hauser (AUT)	90	36			126
3.	Anaïs Chevalier-Bouchet (FRA)	60	60			120
4.	Lisa Vittozzi (ITA)	16	75			91
5.	Linn Persson (SWE)	24	50			74
6.	Sophie Chauveau (FRA)	45	29			74
7.	Vanessa Voigt (GER)	28	45			73
8.	Anna Magnusson (SWE)	36	34			70
9.	Lou Jeanmonnot (FRA)	40	28			68
10.	Hanna Öberg (SWE)	25	40			65
11.	Chloé Chevalier (FRA)	34	31			65
12.	Emma Lunder (CAN)	30	32			62
13.	Ragnhild Femsteinevik (NOR)	32	27			59
14.	Ingrid Landmark Tandrevold (NOR)	31	25			56
15.	Karoline Offigstad Knotten (NOR)	21	30			51
16.	Markéta Davidová (CZE)	27	24			51
17.	Elvira Öberg (SWE)	50	–			50
18.	Dorothea Wierer (ITA)	29	16			45
19.	Mari Eder (FIN)	18	26			44
20.	Jessica Jislová (CZE)	14	23			37
21.	Lena Häcki-Groß (SUI)	12	22			34
22.	Aita Gasparin (SUI)	10	18			28
23.	Franziska Preuß (GER)	26	–			26
24.	Anna Weidel (GER)	23	–			23
25.	Anna Gandler (AUT)	22	–			22
26.	Alina Stremous (MDA)	–	21			21
27.	Denise Herrmann-Wick (GER)	20	–			20
28.	Yuliia Dzhima (UKR)	–	20			20
29.	Paulína Fialková (SVK)	8	10			18
30.	Elisa Gasparin (SUI)	4	12			16
#	Name	LGB	RUH	OST	OSL	Total
31.	Tamara Steiner (AUT)	–	14			14
32.	Caroline Colombo (FRA)	2	8			10
33.	Sophia Schneider (GER)	6	2			8
34.	Ukaleq Astri Slettemark (GRL)	–	6			6
35.	Suvi Minkkinen (FIN)	–	4			4
