= 2022–23 Biathlon World Cup – Individual Men =

2022–23 Biathlon World Cup Men's Individual standings

The 2022–23 Biathlon World Cup – Individual Men started on 29 November 2022 in Kontiolahti and will conclude on 9 March 2023 in Östersund.

== Competition format ==
The individual race is the oldest biathlon event; the distance is skied over five laps. The biathlete shoots four times at any shooting lane, in the order of prone, standing, prone, standing, totalling 20 targets. Competitors' starts are staggered, normally by 30 seconds. The distance skied is usually 20 kilometres (12.4 mi) with a fixed penalty time of one minute per missed target that is added to the skiing time of the biathlete. In the "Short Individual" the distance is 15 kilometres (9.3 mi) with a penalty time of 45 seconds per missed target.

== 2022–23 Top 3 standings ==
Medal	Athlete	Points
Gold:	(Norway) Johannes Thingnes Bø	119
Silver:	(Norway) Vetle Sjåstad Christiansen	111
Bronze:	(Switzerland) Niklas Hartweg	105

== Events summary ==
Event	Gold	Time	Silver	Time	Bronze	Time
Kontiolahti details	Martin Ponsiluoma; Sweden	49:36.5 (0+1+0+0)	Niklas Hartweg; Switzerland	50:13.7 (0+0+0+0)	David Zobel; Germany	50:35.8 (0+0+0+2)
Ruhpolding details	Johannes Thingnes Bø; Norway	48:48.4 (1+0+0+1)	Vetle Sjåstad Christiansen; Norway	48:58.3 (0+0+0+1)	Jakov Fak; Slovenia	49:17.7 (0+0+0+0)
Östersund details	Benedikt Doll; Germany	48:43.4 (0+0+0+0)	Tommaso Giacomel; Italy	49:52.3 (0+1+0+0)	Vetle Sjåstad Christiansen; Norway	49:54.7 (0+1+0+0)

== Standings ==
Final standings.

#	Name	KON	RUH	OST	Total
1.	Vetle Sjåstad Christiansen (NOR)	36	75	60	171
2.	Benedikt Doll (GER)	21	40	90	151
3.	Martin Ponsiluoma (SWE)	90	8	34	132
4.	Roman Rees (GER)	50	28	45	123
5.	Tommaso Giacomel (ITA)	0	45	75	120
6.	Niklas Hartweg (SUI)	75	30	15	120
7.	Johannes Thingnes Bø (NOR)	29	90	–	119
8.	Sturla Holm Lægreid (NOR)	40	50	–	90
9.	Michal Krčmář (CZE)	28	34	28	90
10.	Johannes Dale (NOR)	25	29	30	84
11.	David Zobel (GER)	60	18	0	78
12.	Philipp Nawrath (GER)	23	3	50	76
13.	Éric Perrot (FRA)	16	20	40	76
14.	Jesper Nelin (SWE)	27	23	26	76
15.	Jakov Fak (SLO)	12	60	–	72
16.	Sebastian Stalder (SUI)	22	14	36	72
17.	Fabien Claude (FRA)	32	22	18	72
18.	Simon Eder (AUT)	8	26	32	66
19.	Johannes Kühn (GER)	15	24	23	62
20.	Quentin Fillon Maillet (FRA)	26	32	–	58
21.	Sebastian Samuelsson (SWE)	45	11	–	56
22.	Andrejs Rastorgujevs (LAT)	DNS	36	20	56
23.	Olli Hiidensalo (FIN)	30	21	0	51
24.	David Komatz (AUT)	7	27	14	48
25.	Vytautas Strolia (LTU)	34	9	0	43
26.	Anton Dudchenko (UKR)	11	–	29	40
27.	Patrick Braunhofer (ITA)	17	0	22	39
28.	Justus Strelow (GER)	24	0	13	37
29.	Jakub Štvrtecký (CZE)	14	0	21	35
30.	Sean Doherty (USA)	0	6	27	33
#	Name	KON	RUH	OST	Total
31.	Florent Claude (FRA)	0	25	8	33
32.	Tarjei Bø (NOR)	0	31	–	31
33.	Erlend Bjøntegaard (NOR)	31	–	–	31
33.	Aleksander Fjeld Andersen (NOR)	–	–	31	31
35.	Denys Nasyko (UKR)	0	15	16	31
36.	Endre Strømsheim (NOR)	–	–	25	25
37.	Didier Bionaz (ITA)	DNS	0	24	24
38.	Peppe Femling (SWE)	20	0	0	20
39.	Émilien Claude (FRA)	4	16	–	20
40.	Anton Vidmar (SLO)	0	19	0	19
41.	Adam Runnalls (CAN)	0	0	19	19
42.	Vladimir Iliev (BUL)	19	0	DNS	19
43.	Bogdan Tsymbal (UKR)	10	7	2	19
44.	Filip Fjeld Andersen (NOR)	18	0	–	18
45.	Alex Cisar (SLO)	0	17	DNS	17
46.	Malte Stefansson (SWE)	–	0	17	17
47.	Miha Dovžan (SLO)	9	0	7	16
48.	Artem Tyshchenko (UKR)	–	13	0	13
49.	Émilien Jacquelin (FRA)	13	–	–	13
50.	Taras Lesiuk (UKR)	1	12	–	13
51.	Christian Gow (CAN)	5	4	4	13
52.	Mikito Tachizaki (JPN)	0	0	12	12
53.	Antonin Guigonnat (FRA)	0	0	11	11
54.	Rok Tršan (SLO)	0	0	10	10
55.	Raul Flore (ROU)	0	10	0	10
56.	Jonáš Mareček (CZE)	0	–	9	9
57.	Thierry Langer (BEL)	0	0	6	6
58.	Tero Seppälä (FIN)	6	–	–	6
59.	George Buta (ROU)	0	–	5	5
60.	Jeremy Finello (SUI)	0	5	–	5
#	Name	KON	RUH	OST	Total
61.	Oscar Lombardot (FRA)	–	0	3	3
62.	Emil Nykvist (SWE)	3	0	–	3
63.	Campbell Wright (NZL)	0	2	–	2
64.	Patrick Jakob (AUT)	2	–		2
65.	Elia Zeni (ITA)	–	–	1	1
65.	Paul Schommer (USA)	–	1		1
