= 2022–23 Biathlon World Cup – Mass start Men =

2022–23 Biathlon World Cup Men's Mass Start standings

The 2022–23 Biathlon World Cup – Mass Start Men started on 18 December 2022 in Annecy-Le Grand-Bornand and will conclude on 19 March 2023 in Oslo Holmenkollen.

== Competition format ==
In the mass start, all biathletes start at the same time and the first across the finish line wins. In this 15 kilometres (9.3 mi) competition, the distance is skied over five laps; there are four bouts of shooting (two prone and two standing, in that order) with the first shooting bout being at the lane corresponding to the competitor's bib number (bib #10 shoots at lane #10 regardless of position in race), with the rest of the shooting bouts being on a first-come, first-served basis (if a competitor arrives at the lane in fifth place, they shoot at lane 5). As in the sprint and pursuit, competitors must ski one 150 metres (490 ft) penalty loop for each miss. Here again, to avoid unwanted congestion, World Cup Mass starts are held with only the 30 top ranking athletes on the start line (half that of the pursuit) as here all contestants start simultaneously.

== 2022–23 Top 3 standings ==
Medal	Athlete	Points
Gold:	(Norway) Johannes Thingnes Bø	150
Silver:	(Norway) Sturla Holm Lægreid	135
Bronze:	(Norway) Vetle Sjåstad Christiansen	120

== Events summary ==
Event	Gold	Time	Silver	Time	Bronze	Time
Annecy-Le Grand-Bornand details	Johannes Dale; Norway	35:02.2 (0+0+2+0)	Sturla Holm Lægreid; Norway	35:02.5 (0+0+1+1)	Johannes Thingnes Bø; Norway	35:12.8 (0+0+1+2)
Ruhpolding details	Johannes Thingnes Bø; Norway	36:12.0 (1+0+1+1)	Vetle Sjåstad Christiansen; Norway	36:31.3 (1+0+1+0)	Sturla Holm Lægreid; Norway	36:47.3 (1+0+1+0)
Östersund details	Vetle Sjåstad Christiansen; Norway	35:17.0 (0+0+0+0)	Johannes Dale; Norway	35:26.1 (0+0+0+1)	Éric Perrot; France	35:29.3 (0+1+0+0)
Oslo Holmenkollen details	Johannes Thingnes Bø; Norway	38:51.9 (1+0+0+1)	Niklas Hartweg; Switzerland	39:18.1 (0+0+0+0)	Vetle Sjåstad Christiansen; Norway	39:27.1 (0+0+0+0)

== Standings ==
Final standings after 4 competitions.

#	Name	LGB	RUH	OST	OSL	Total
1.	Vetle Sjåstad Christiansen (NOR)	45	75	90	60	270
2.	Johannes Thingnes Bø (NOR)	60	90	–	90	240
2.	Sturla Holm Lægreid (NOR)	75	60	28	45	208
4.	Johannes Dale (NOR)	90	23	75	18	206
5.	Sebastian Stalder (SUI)	34	32	45	32	143
6.	Fabien Claude (FRA)	50	31	22	29	132
7.	Tarjei Bø (NOR)	40	50	–	36	126
8.	Niklas Hartweg (SUI)	–	24	16	75	115
9.	Michal Krčmář (CZE)	20	16	50	25	111
10.	Benedikt Doll (GER)	36	26	34	14	110
11.	Quentin Fillon Maillet (FRA)	30	25	–	50	105
12.	Roman Rees (GER)	25	18	31	28	102
13.	Tommaso Giacomel (ITA)	28	21	30	20	99
14.	Simon Eder (AUT)	–	29	36	31	97
15.	Martin Ponsiluoma (SWE)	10	10	27	40	87
16.	Justus Strelow (GER)	23	34	24	6	87
17.	David Zobel (GER)	22	14	26	24	86
18.	Jesper Nelin (SWE)	18	27	14	26	85
19.	Andrejs Rastorgujevs (LAT)	–	22	32	30	84
20.	Vytautas Strolia (LTU)	16	40	20	4	80
21.	Jakov Fak (SLO)	24	28	–	23	75
22.	Émilien Jacquelin (FRA)	27	45	–	–	72
23.	Florent Claude (BEL)	26	20	12	10	68
24.	Timofey Lapshin (KOR)	14	30	21	–	65
25.	Antonin Guigonnat (FRA)	29	12	DNF	22	63
26.	Éric Perrot (FRA)	–	–	60	–	60
27.	Aleksander Fjeld Andersen (NOR)	–	–	40	–	40
28.	Philipp Nawrath (GER)	–	–	18	21	39
29.	Sebastian Samuelsson (SWE)	2	36	–	–	38
30.	Johannes Kühn (GER)	–	8	29	–	37
#	Name	LGB	RUH	OST	OSL	Total
31.	Filip Fjeld Andersen (NOR)	32	2	–	2	36
32.	Tero Seppälä (FIN)	–	–	–	34	34
33.	Tuomas Harjula (FIN)	31	–	–	–	31
34.	David Komatz (AUT)	–	4	–	27	31
35.	Sean Doherty (USA)	8	–	10	12	30
36.	Anton Dudchenko (UKR)	–	–	25	–	25
37.	Endre Strømsheim (NOR)	–	–	23	–	23
38.	Felix Leitner (AUT)	21	–	–	–	21
39.	Anton Vidmar (SLO)	–	–	–	16	16
40.	Olli Hiidensalo (FIN)	6	6	4	–	16
41.	Émilien Claude (FRA)	12	–	–	–	12
42.	Otto Invenius (FIN)	–	–	–	8	8
42.	Didier Bionaz (ITA)	–	–	8	–	8
44.	Patrick Braunhofer (ITA)	–	–	6	–	6
45.	Artem Pryma (UKR)	4	–	–	–	4
