= Biathlon Junior World Championships 2017 =

Biathlon event in Slovakia

2017 IBU Youth & Junior World Championships
- Host city: Osrblie, Slovakia
- Dates: 21 February – 28 February
- Events: 16

The 2017 Biathlon Junior World Championships was held in Osrblie, Slovakia from February 21 to February 28, 2017. There was a total of 16 competitions: sprint, pursuit, individual, and relay races for men and women.

== Schedule ==
All times are local (UTC+2).

Date	Time	Event
22 February	11:00	Youth Men's 10 km individual
22 February	14:00	Youth Women's 12.5 km individual
23 February	11:30	Junior Men's 12.5 km individual
23 February	14:30	Junior Women's 15 km individual
24 February	11:00	Youth Men's 6 km sprint
24 February	14:00	Youth Women's 7.5 km sprint
25 February	11:00	Junior Men's 7.5 km sprint
25 February	14:00	Junior Women's 10 km sprint
26 February	11:00	Youth Men's 7.5 km pursuit
26 February	12:00	Junior Men's 10 km pursuit
26 February	14:15	Youth Women's 10 km pursuit
26 February	15:20	Junior Women's 12.5 km sprint
27 February	11:00	Youth Men's 3 × 7.5 km relay
27 February	13:45	Youth Women's 3 × 6 km relay
28 February	11:00	Junior Men's 4 × 7.5 km relay
28 February	14:00	Junior Women's 3 × 6 km relay

== Medal winners ==
=== Youth Women ===
Event:	Gold:	Time	Silver:	Time	Bronze:	Time
10 km Individual details	Lou Jeanmonnot-Laurent; France	34:00.9 (0+1+0+0)	Kristina Egorova; Russia	34:53.3 (0+1+0+0)	Elvira Öberg; Sweden	35:17.0 (0+0+1+1)
6 km Sprint details	Irene Lardschneider; Italy	19:48.3 (0+1)	Anna Gandler; Austria	20:54.8 (0+1)	Samuela Comola; Italy	21:06.4 (0+0)
7.5 km Pursuit details	Irene Lardschneider; Italy	26:57.1 (0+0+2+2)	Lou Jeanmonnot-Laurent; France	27:21.5 (0+0+1+0)	Samuela Comola; Italy	28:05.6 (1+0+1+0)
3 × 6 km Relay details	Russia; Ekaterina Sannikova; Anastasiia Goreeva; Kristina Egorova	59:43.2 (0+1) (0+3) (0+0) (1+3) (0+0) (0+0)	Norway; Marthe Krakstad Johansen; Marit Ishol Skogan; Mari Wetterhus	1:00:01.5 (0+0) (0+0) (0+2) (0+0) (0+0) (0+2)	Italy; Samuela Comola; Irene Lardschneider; Martina Vigna	1:00:48.0 (0+0) (0+0) (0+1) (1+3) (0+0) (0+0)

=== Junior Women ===
Event:	Gold:	Time	Silver:	Time	Bronze:	Time
12.5 km Individual details	Megan Bankes; Canada	37:22.0 (0+0+0+0)	Julia Schwaiger; Austria	38:09.9 (0+0+0+1)	Anna Weidel; Germany	38:42.0 (0+1+0+0)
7.5 km Sprint details	Michela Carrara; Italy	20:57.8 (0+0)	Ingrid Landmark Tandrevold; Norway	21:13.0 (0+1)	Myrtille Begue; France	21:29.3 (0+0)
10 km Pursuit details	Valeriia Vasnetcova; Russia	31:49.5 (0+0+0+0)	Michela Carrara; Italy	31:59.5 (1+1+1+0)	Ingrid Landmark Tandrevold; Norway	32:00.3 (0+0+1+1)
3 × 6 km Relay details	Norway; Hilde Eide; Karoline Erdal; Ingrid Landmark Tandrevold	56:18.4 (0+2) (0+2) (0+1) (0+1) (0+0) (0+2)	Germany; Vanessa Voigt; Sophia Schneider; Anna Weidel	56:34.9 (0+1) (1+3) (0+0) (0+3) (0+0) (0+2)	Russia; Kristina Reztsova; Ekaterina Moshkova; Valeriia Vasnetcova	56:44.6 (0+1) (1+3) (0+0) (0+3) (0+0) (0+2)

=== Youth Men ===
Event:	Gold:	Time	Silver:	Time	Bronze:	Time
12.5 km Individual details	Leo Grandbois; Canada	32:56.6 (0+0+0+0)	Said Karimulla Khalili; Russia	34:11.5 (1+0+1+1)	Danilo Riethmüller; Germany	34:18.1 (2+1+0+0)
7.5 km Sprint details	Emilien Claude; France	20:18.3 (1+1)	Serhiy Telen; Ukraine	20:43.5 (0+1)	Sivert Guttorm Bakken; Norway	21:02.9 (1+1)
10 km Pursuit details	Emilien Claude; France	29:22.4 (1+1+0+2)	Cedric Christille; Italy	29:38.4 (0+0+1+1)	Danilo Riethmüller; Germany	29:53.1 (1+0+1+2)
3 × 7.5 km Relay details	Norway; Jorgen Brendengen Krogsaetter; Vebjørn Sørum; Sivert Guttorm Bakken	55:05.4 (0+0) (0+1) (0+2) (0+1) (0+1) (0+1)	Russia; Aleksandr Miakonkii; Ilia Novopashin; Said Karimulla Khalili	55:59.6 (0+1) (0+3) (0+0) (0+2) (0+0) (2+3)	Belarus; Kiryl Tsiuryn; Ilya Auseyenka; Dzmitry Lazouski	56:47.0 (0+0) (0+2) (0+0) (0+1) (0+2) (0+3)

=== Junior Men ===
Event:	Gold:	Time	Silver:	Time	Bronze:	Time
15 km Individual details	Sindre Pettersen; Norway	40:17.2 (0+0+0+2)	David Zobel; Germany	41:08.4 (0+2+1+0)	Nikita Lobastov; Russia	41:12.4 (0+1+0+0)
10 km Sprint details	Igor Malinovskii; Russia	24:32.2 (0+0)	Kiril Streltsov; Russia	24:44.4 (0+0)	Roman Yeremin; Kazakhstan	24:57.1 (2+0)
12.5 km Pursuit details	Igor Malinovskii; Russia	32:39.8 (0+1+2+1)	Sindre Pettersen; Norway	32:52.8 (2+1+1+1)	Anton Smolski; Belarus	33:07.2 (0+0+3+2)
4 × 7.5 km Relay details	Russia; Nikita Lobastov; Igor Malinovskii; Nikita Porshnev; Kirill Streltsov	1:17:27.8 (0+1) (0+2) (0+1) (0+0) (0+2) (0+1) (0+0) (0+0)	Norway; Dag Sander Bjørndalen; Johannes Dale; Aleksander Fjeld Andersen; Sindre Pettersen	1:18:19.9 (1+3) (0+3) (0+0) (0+1) (0+3) (0+0) (0+0) (0+2)	Germany; Justus Strelow; Danilo Riethmüller; Dominik Schmuck; David Zobel	1:19:07.2 (0+3) (0+0) (0+3) (0+2) (0+2) (1+3) (0+2) (0+1)

== Medal table ==
Rank	Nation	Gold	Silver	Bronze	Total
1	Russia (RUS)	5	4	2	11
2	Norway (NOR)	3	4	2	9
3	Italy (ITA)	3	2	3	8
4	France (FRA)	3	1	1	5
5	Canada (CAN)	2	0	0	2
6	Germany (GER)	0	2	4	6
7	Austria (AUT)	0	2	0	2
8	Ukraine (UKR)	0	1	0	1
9	Belarus (BLR)	0	0	2	2
10	Kazakhstan (KAZ)	0	0	1	1
10	Sweden (SWE)	0	0	1	1
Totals (11 entries)		16	16	16	48
