= 2022–23 Biathlon World Cup =

Biathlon competition

Discipline	Men	Women
Overall	(Norway) Johannes Thingnes Bø (4)	(France) Julia Simon (1)
U25	(Switzerland) Niklas Hartweg (1)	(Sweden) Elvira Öberg (2)
Individual	(Norway) Vetle Sjåstad Christiansen (1)	(Italy) Lisa Vittozzi (2)
Sprint	(Norway) Johannes Thingnes Bø (3)	(Germany) Denise Herrmann-Wick (2)
Pursuit	(Norway) Johannes Thingnes Bø (2)	(France) Julia Simon (1)
Mass start	(Norway) Vetle Sjåstad Christiansen (1)	(France) Julia Simon (1)
Relay	Norway (14)	France (3)
Nations Cup	Norway (19)	France (4)
- Mixed: France (2)

Competition
Edition	46th	41st
Locations	9	9
Individual	21	21
Relay/Team	5	5
Mixed	4	4
Cancelled	–	1
Rescheduled	–	1

Overall Champions

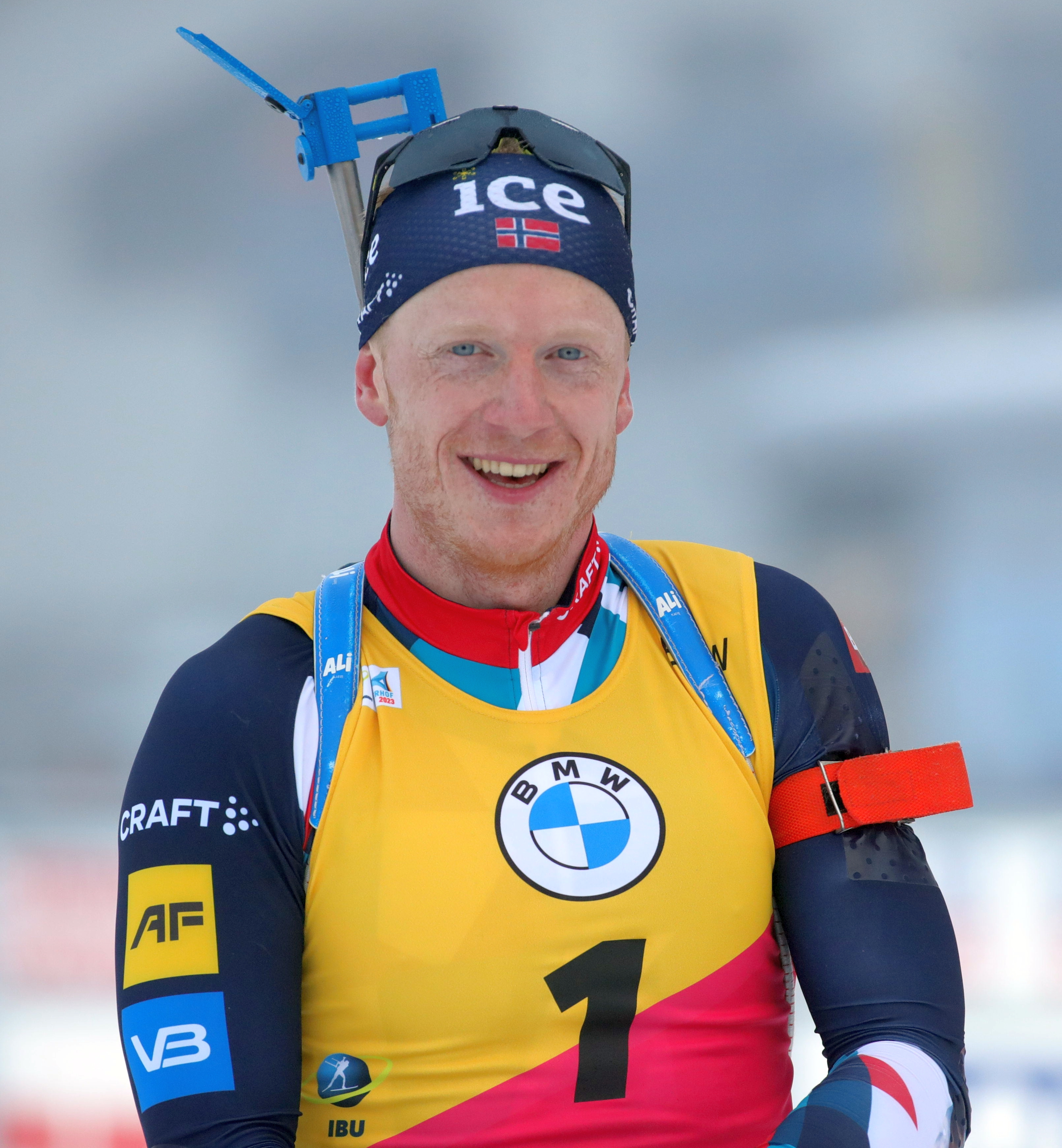
Johannes Thingnes Bø won his fourth overall World Cup title. He won 16 individual races in this season.

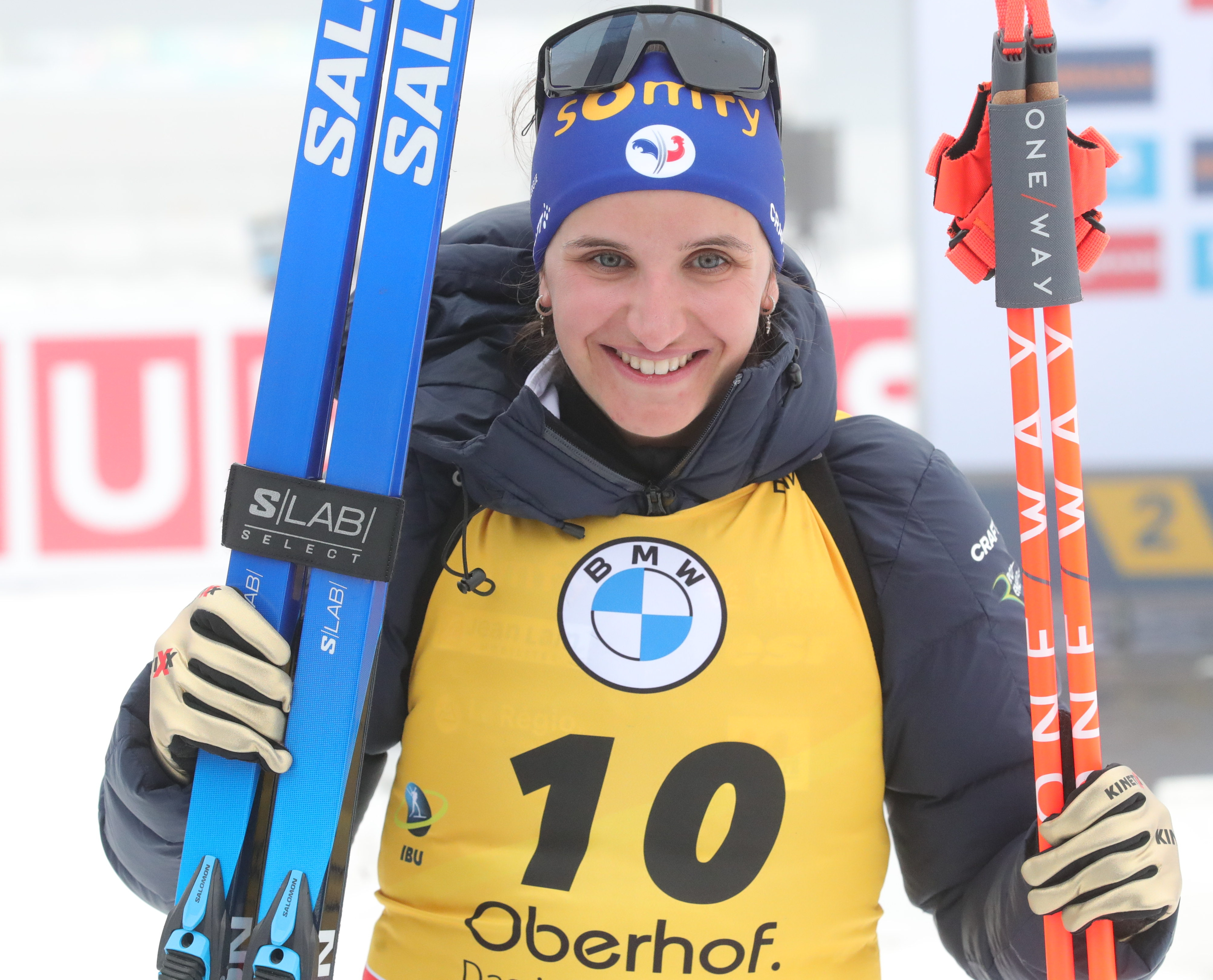
Julia Simon won her first overall World Cup title in history. She became the first French woman since 2005 to win the World Cup.

The 2022–23 Biathlon World Cup (official: BMW IBU World Cup Biathlon) was a multi-race series over a season of biathlon, organised by the International Biathlon Union (IBU). It was the 46th edition for men and 41st edition for women of the highest international race series in biathlon.

The season started on 29 November 2022 in Kontiolahti, Finland and ended on 19 March 2023 in Oslo Holmenkollen, Norway.

The highlight of the season were the 2023 Biathlon World Championships in Oberhof, Germany. For the first time since 1993, the results of the World Championships were not included in the World Cup rankings (except for the national standings).

Quentin Fillon Maillet from France and Marte Olsbu Røiseland from Norway were the defending overall champions from the 2021–22 season. Fillon Maillet finished the season in 8th place and Olsbu Røiseland in 15th place.

== Map of world cup hosts ==
All 10 locations hosting world cup events in this season (including Oberhof – venue of the World Championships).

(Finland) Kontiolahti	(Austria) Hochfilzen	(France) Annecy-Le Grand-Bornand	(Slovenia) Pokljuka	(Germany) Ruhpolding
Europe
(Italy) Antholz-Anterselva	(Germany) Oberhof	(Czech Republic) Nové Město	(Sweden) Östersund	(Norway) Oslo Holmenkollen

World Championships

== Calendar ==
Stage	Location	Date	Individual / Short individual	Sprint	Pursuit	Mass start	Relay	Mixed relay	Single mixed relay	Details
1	(Finland) Kontiolahti	29 November–4 December	●	●	●		●			details
2	(Austria) Hochfilzen	8–11 December		●	●		●			details
3	(France) Annecy-Le Grand-Bornand	15–18 December		●	●	●				details
4	(Slovenia) Pokljuka	5–8 January		●	●			●	●	details
5	(Germany) Ruhpolding	11–15 January	●			●	●			details
6	(Italy) Antholz-Anterselva	19–22 January		●	●		●			details
WC	(Germany) Oberhof	8–19 February	●	●	●	●	●	●	●	World Championships
7	(Czech Republic) Nové Město na Moravě	2–5 March		●	●			●	●	details
8	(Sweden) Östersund	9–12 March	●			●	●			details
9	(Norway) Oslo Holmenkollen	16–19 March		●	●	●				details
Total: 68 (31 men's, 31 women's, 6 mixed)			4	8	8	5	6	3	3	

== Men ==
=== Calendar ===
Key: IND – Individual / SIND – Short Individual / SPR – Sprint / PUR – Pursuit / MSS – Mass Start
#	Date	Place (In brackets Stage)	Discipline	Winner	Second	Third	R.
1	29 November 2022	(Finland) Kontiolahti (1)	20 km IND	(Sweden) Martin Ponsiluoma	(Switzerland) Niklas Hartweg	(Germany) David Zobel	
2	3 December 2022	(Finland) Kontiolahti (1)	10 km SPR	(Norway) Johannes Thingnes Bø	(Norway) Sturla Holm Lægreid	(Germany) Roman Rees	
3	4 December 2022	(Finland) Kontiolahti (1)	12.5 km PUR	(Norway) Johannes Thingnes Bø	(Norway) Sturla Holm Lægreid	(France) Émilien Jacquelin	
4	9 December 2022	(Austria) Hochfilzen (2)	10 km SPR	(Norway) Johannes Thingnes Bø	(France) Émilien Jacquelin	(Norway) Sturla Holm Lægreid	
5	11 December 2022	(Austria) Hochfilzen (2)	12.5 km PUR	(Norway) Johannes Thingnes Bø	(Norway) Sturla Holm Lægreid	(France) Émilien Jacquelin	
6	15 December 2022	(France) Annecy-Le Grand-Bornand (3)	10 km SPR	(Norway) Johannes Thingnes Bø	(Norway) Sturla Holm Lægreid	(Germany) Benedikt Doll	
7	17 December 2022	(France) Annecy-Le Grand-Bornand (3)	12.5 km PUR	(Norway) Sturla Holm Lægreid	(Norway) Vetle Sjåstad Christiansen	(Norway) Johannes Thingnes Bø	
8	18 December 2022	(France) Annecy-Le Grand-Bornand (3)	15 km MSS	(Norway) Johannes Dale	(Norway) Sturla Holm Lægreid	(Norway) Johannes Thingnes Bø	
9	6 January 2023	(Slovenia) Pokljuka (4)	10 km SPR	(Norway) Johannes Thingnes Bø	(Norway) Tarjei Bø	(Norway) Sturla Holm Lægreid	
10	7 January 2023	(Slovenia) Pokljuka (4)	12.5 km PUR	(Norway) Johannes Thingnes Bø	(France) Quentin Fillon Maillet	(Norway) Tarjei Bø	
11	11 January 2023	(Germany) Ruhpolding (5)	20 km IND	(Norway) Johannes Thingnes Bø	(Norway) Vetle Sjåstad Christiansen	(Slovenia) Jakov Fak	
12	15 January 2023	(Germany) Ruhpolding (5)	15 km MSS	(Norway) Johannes Thingnes Bø	(Norway) Vetle Sjåstad Christiansen	(Norway) Sturla Holm Lægreid	
13	20 January 2023	(Italy) Antholz-Anterselva (6)	10 km SPR	(Norway) Johannes Thingnes Bø	(Sweden) Martin Ponsiluoma	(Norway) Sturla Holm Lægreid	
14	21 January 2023	(Italy) Antholz-Anterselva (6)	12.5 km PUR	(Norway) Johannes Thingnes Bø	(Norway) Sturla Holm Lægreid	(Sweden) Martin Ponsiluoma	
Biathlon World Championships 2023 (8–19 February) (Note: not included in the World Cup)
WCH	11 February 2023	(Germany) Oberhof	10 km SPR	(Norway) Johannes Thingnes Bø	(Norway) Tarjei Bø	(Norway) Sturla Holm Lægreid	
WCH	12 February 2023	(Germany) Oberhof	12.5 km PUR	(Norway) Johannes Thingnes Bø	(Norway) Sturla Holm Lægreid	(Sweden) Sebastian Samuelsson	
WCH	14 February 2023	(Germany) Oberhof	20 km IND	(Norway) Johannes Thingnes Bø	(Norway) Sturla Holm Lægreid	(Sweden) Sebastian Samuelsson	
WCH	19 February 2023	(Germany) Oberhof	15 km MSS	(Sweden) Sebastian Samuelsson	(Sweden) Martin Ponsiluoma	(Norway) Johannes Thingnes Bø	
15	2 March 2023	(Czech Republic) Nové Město (7)	10 km SPR	(Norway) Johannes Thingnes Bø	(Norway) Tarjei Bø	(Norway) Vetle Sjåstad Christiansen	
16	4 March 2023	(Czech Republic) Nové Město (7)	12.5 km PUR	(Norway) Johannes Thingnes Bø	(Norway) Tarjei Bø	(Sweden) Martin Ponsiluoma	
17	9 March 2023	(Sweden) Östersund (8)	20 km IND	(Germany) Benedikt Doll	(Italy) Tommaso Giacomel	(Norway) Vetle Sjåstad Christiansen	
18	12 March 2023	(Sweden) Östersund (8)	15 km MSS	(Norway) Vetle Sjåstad Christiansen	(Norway) Johannes Dale	(France) Éric Perrot	
19	16 March 2023	(Norway) Oslo Holmenkollen (9)	10 km SPR	(Norway) Johannes Thingnes Bø	(Sweden) Martin Ponsiluoma	(Germany) Benedikt Doll	
20	18 March 2023	(Norway) Oslo Holmenkollen (9)	12.5 km PUR	(Norway) Johannes Thingnes Bø	(France) Quentin Fillon Maillet	(Norway) Sturla Holm Lægreid	
21	19 March 2023	(Norway) Oslo Holmenkollen (9)	15 km MSS	(Norway) Johannes Thingnes Bø	(Switzerland) Niklas Hartweg	(Norway) Vetle Sjåstad Christiansen	

=== Relay – 4 x 7.5 km ===
#	Date	Place (In brackets Stage)	Winner	Second	Third	Leader (After competition)	R.
1	1 December 2022	(Finland) Kontiolahti (1)	Norway: 1. Vetle Sjåstad Christiansen; 2. Sturla Holm Lægreid; 3. Tarjei Bø; 4. Johannes Thingnes Bø	Germany: 1. Justus Strelow; 2. Johannes Kühn; 3. Benedikt Doll; 4. Roman Rees	France: 1. Éric Perrot; 2. Fabien Claude; 3. Émilien Jacquelin; 4. Quentin Fillon Maillet	Norway	
2	10 December 2022	(Austria) Hochfilzen (2)	Norway 1.Sturla Holm Lægreid; 2. Filip Fjeld Andersen; 3. Johannes Thingnes Bø; 4. Vetle Sjåstad Christiansen	Sweden: 1. Jesper Nelin; 2. Martin Ponsiluoma; 3. Peppe Femling; 4. Sebastian Samuelsson	Germany: 1. Justus Strelow; 2. Johannes Kühn; 3. Roman Rees; 4. Benedikt Doll	Norway	
3	13 January 2023	(Germany) Ruhpolding (5)	Norway: 1. Sturla Holm Lægreid; 2. Tarjei Bø; 3. Vetle Sjåstad Christiansen; 4. Johannes Thingnes Bø	Germany: 1. David Zobel; 2. Johannes Kühn; 3. Benedikt Doll; 4. Roman Rees	France: 1. Éric Perrot; 2. Quentin Fillon Maillet; 3. Antonin Guigonnat; 4. Fabien Claude	Norway	
4	22 January 2023	(Italy) Antholz-Anterselva (6)	Norway: 1. Sturla Holm Lægreid; 2. Tarjei Bø; 3. Johannes Thingnes Bø; 4. Vetle Sjåstad Christiansen	France: 1. Antonin Guigonnat; 2. Fabien Claude; 3. Émilien Jacquelin; 4. Quentin Fillon Maillet	Germany: 1. David Zobel; 2. Johannes Kühn; 3. Benedikt Doll; 4. Roman Rees	Norway	
WCH	18 February 2023	(Germany) Oberhof	France: 1. Antonin Guigonnat; 2. Fabien Claude; 3. Émilien Jacquelin; 4. Quentin Fillon Maillet	Norway: 1. Vetle Sjåstad Christiansen; 2. Tarjei Bø; 3. Sturla Holm Lægreid; 4. Johannes Thingnes Bø	Sweden: 1. Peppe Femling; 2. Martin Ponsiluoma; 3. Jesper Nelin; 4. Sebastian Samuelsson	not included in the World Cup	
5	11 March 2023	(Sweden) Östersund (8)	Norway: 1. Endre Strømsheim; 2. Vebjørn Sørum; 3. Johannes Dale; 4. Vetle Sjåstad Christiansen	France: 1. Oscar Lombardot; 2. Antonin Guigonnat; 3. Éric Perrot; 4. Fabien Claude	Germany: 1. Roman Rees; 2. Johannes Kühn; 3. Philipp Nawrath; 4. Benedikt Doll	Norway	

=== Overall leaders ===
==== Overall ====
No.	Holder	Date gained	Place	Date forfeited	Place	Number of competitions
1.	(Sweden) Martin Ponsiluoma	29 November 2022	(Finland) Kontiolahti	3 December 2022	(Finland) Kontiolahti	1
2.	(Norway) Johannes Thingnes Bø	3 December 2022	(Finland) Kontiolahti	Overall Winner		20

==== Under 25 ====
No.	Holder	Date gained	Place	Date forfeited	Place	Number of competitions
1.	(Switzerland) Niklas Hartweg	29 November 2022	(Finland) Kontiolahti	17 December 2022	(France) Annecy-Le Grand-Bornand	6
2.	(Norway) Filip Fjeld Andersen	17 December 2022	(France) Annecy-Le Grand-Bornand	15 January 2023	(Germany) Ruhpolding	5
3.	(Switzerland) Niklas Hartweg	15 January 2023	(Germany) Ruhpolding	9 March 2023	(Sweden) Östersund	5
4.	(Italy) Tommaso Giacomel	9 March 2023	(Sweden) Östersund	19 March 2023	(Norway) Oslo-Holmenkollen	4
5.	(Switzerland) Niklas Hartweg	19 March 2023	(Norway) Oslo-Holmenkollen	U25 Winner		1

=== Standings ===
==== Overall ====
Rank	after all 21 events	Points
Yellow bib	(Norway) Johannes Thingnes Bø	1589
2	(Norway) Sturla Holm Lægreid	1098
3	(Norway) Vetle Sjåstad Christiansen	935
4	(Germany) Benedikt Doll	782
5	(Sweden) Martin Ponsiluoma	779
6	(Norway) Tarjei Bø	684
7	(Norway) Johannes Dale	674
8	(France) Quentin Fillon Maillet	671
9	(Germany) Roman Rees	658
10	(France) Fabien Claude	635

==== Under 25 ====
Rank	after all 21 events	Points
Dark blue bib	(Switzerland) Niklas Hartweg	608
2	(Italy) Tommaso Giacomel	592
3	(Switzerland) Sebastian Stalder	426
4	(Norway) Filip Fjeld Andersen	324
5	(France) Éric Perrot	189
6	(Canada) Adam Runnalls	109
7	(Slovenia) Anton Vidmar	95
8	(Finland) Tuomas Harjula	94
9	(Czech Republic) Jakub Štvrtecký	86
10	(Italy) Didier Bionaz	78

==== Individual ====
Rank	after all 3 events	Points
Red bib	(Norway) Vetle Sjåstad Christiansen	171
2	(Germany) Benedikt Doll	151
3	(Sweden) Martin Ponsiluoma	132
4	(Germany) Roman Rees	123
5	(Italy) Tommaso Giacomel	120

==== Sprint ====
Rank	after all 7 events	Points
Red bib	(Norway) Johannes Thingnes Bø	630
2	(Norway) Sturla Holm Lægreid	375
3	(Sweden) Martin Ponsiluoma	328
4	(Germany) Benedikt Doll	285
5	(Norway) Vetle Sjåstad Christiansen	257

==== Pursuit ====
Rank	after all 7 events	Points
Red bib	(Norway) Johannes Thingnes Bø	600
2	(Norway) Sturla Holm Lægreid	425
3	(France) Quentin Fillon Maillet	295
4	(Norway) Tarjei Bø	277
5	(France) Fabien Claude	252

==== Mass start ====
Rank	after all 4 events	Points
Red bib	(Norway) Vetle Sjåstad Christiansen	270
2	(Norway) Johannes Thingnes Bø	240
3	(Norway) Sturla Holm Lægreid	208
4	(Norway) Johannes Dale	206
5	(Switzerland) Sebastian Stalder	143

==== Relay ====
Rank	after all 5 events	Points
1	Norway	450
2	Germany	330
3	France	320
4	Sweden	256
5	Austria	190

==== Nations Cup ====
Rank	after all 24 events	Points
1	Norway	8993
2	France	7977
3	Germany	7813
4	Sweden	7399
5	Switzerland	6345

== Women ==
=== Calendar ===
Key: IND – Individual / SIND – Short Individual / SPR – Sprint / PUR – Pursuit / MSS – Mass Start
#	Date	Place (In brackets Stage)	Discipline	Winner	Second	Third	R.
1	30 November 2022	(Finland) Kontiolahti (1)	15 km IND	(Sweden) Hanna Öberg	(Norway) Ingrid Landmark Tandrevold	(Italy) Lisa Vittozzi	
2	3 December 2022	(Finland) Kontiolahti (1)	7.5 km SPR	(Austria) Lisa Theresa Hauser	(Italy) Lisa Vittozzi	(Sweden) Linn Persson	
3	4 December 2022	(Finland) Kontiolahti (1)	10 km PUR	(France) Julia Simon	(Italy) Dorothea Wierer	(Sweden) Elvira Öberg	
4	8 December 2022	(Austria) Hochfilzen (2)	7.5 km SPR	(Germany) Denise Herrmann-Wick	(Czech Republic) Markéta Davidová	(France) Julia Simon	
5	10 December 2022	(Austria) Hochfilzen (2)	10 km PUR	(France) Julia Simon	(Norway) Ingrid Landmark Tandrevold	(Czech Republic) Markéta Davidová	
6	16 December 2022	(France) Annecy-Le Grand-Bornand (3)	7.5 km SPR	(Sweden) Anna Magnusson	(Sweden) Linn Persson	(Germany) Denise Herrmann-Wick	
7	17 December 2022	(France) Annecy-Le Grand-Bornand (3)	10 km PUR	(Sweden) Elvira Öberg	(Italy) Lisa Vittozzi	(France) Julia Simon	
8	18 December 2022	(France) Annecy-Le Grand-Bornand (3)	12.5 km MSS	(Austria) Lisa Theresa Hauser	(France) Julia Simon	(France) Anaïs Chevalier-Bouchet	
9	5 January 2023	(Slovenia) Pokljuka (4)	7.5 km SPR	(Sweden) Elvira Öberg	(France) Julia Simon	(Italy) Dorothea Wierer	
10	7 January 2023	(Slovenia) Pokljuka (4)	10 km PUR	(Sweden) Elvira Öberg	(Italy) Dorothea Wierer	(France) Julia Simon	
11	12 January 2023	(Germany) Ruhpolding (5)	15 km IND	(Italy) Lisa Vittozzi	(France) Lou Jeanmonnot	(France) Julia Simon	
12	15 January 2023	(Germany) Ruhpolding (5)	12.5 km MSS	(France) Julia Simon	(Italy) Lisa Vittozzi	(France) Anaïs Chevalier-Bouchet	
13	19 January 2023	(Italy) Antholz-Anterselva (6)	7.5 km SPR	(Italy) Dorothea Wierer	(France) Chloé Chevalier	(Sweden) Elvira Öberg	
14	21 January 2023	(Italy) Antholz-Anterselva (6)	10 km PUR	(Germany) Denise Herrmann-Wick	(Italy) Lisa Vittozzi	(Sweden) Elvira Öberg	
Biathlon World Championships 2023 (8–19 February)
WCH	10 February 2023	(Germany) Oberhof	7.5km SPR	(Germany) Denise Herrmann-Wick	(Sweden) Hanna Öberg	(Sweden) Linn Persson	
WCH	12 February 2023	(Germany) Oberhof	10 km PUR	(France) Julia Simon	(Germany) Denise Herrmann-Wick	(Norway) Marte Olsbu Roeiseland	
WCH	15 February 2023	(Germany) Oberhof	15 km IND	(Sweden) Hanna Öberg	(Sweden) Linn Persson	(Italy) Lisa Vittozzi	
WCH	19 February 2023	(Germany) Oberhof	12.5 km MSS	(Sweden) Hanna Öberg	(Norway) Ingrid Landmark Tandrevold	(France) Julia Simon	
15	3 March 2023	(Czech Republic) Nové Město (7)	7.5 km SPR	(Norway) Marte Olsbu Røiseland	(Norway) Ingrid Landmark Tandrevold	(France) Anaïs Chevalier-Bouchet	
16	4 March 2023	(Czech Republic) Nové Město (7)	10 km PUR	(Norway) Marte Olsbu Røiseland	(Norway) Ingrid Landmark Tandrevold	(France) Anaïs Chevalier-Bouchet	
17	9 March 2023	(Sweden) Östersund (8)	15 km IND	(Italy) Dorothea Wierer	(Italy) Lisa Vittozzi	(Germany) Denise Herrmann-Wick	
18	12 March 2023	(Sweden) Östersund (8)	12.5 km MSS	(Italy) Dorothea Wierer	(France) Lou Jeanmonnot	(France) Julia Simon	
19	(Note: Women's Sprint originally scheduled for 17 March 2023 (Friday), was rescheduled to 18 March 2023 (Saturday), due to bad weather.)18 March 2023	(Norway) Oslo Holmenkollen (9)	7.5 km SPR	(Germany) Denise Herrmann-Wick	(Sweden) Hanna Öberg	(Sweden) Anna Magnusson	
	18 March 2023	(Norway) Oslo Holmenkollen (9)	10 km PUR	Cancelled due to delayed Sprint			
20	19 March 2023	(Norway) Oslo Holmenkollen (9)	12.5 km MSS	(Sweden) Hanna Öberg	(Norway) Marte Olsbu Røiseland	(France) Anaïs Chevalier-Bouchet	

=== Relay – 4 x 6 km ===
#	Date	Place (In brackets Stage)	Winner	Second	Third	Leader (After competition)	R.
1	1 December 2022	(Finland) Kontiolahti (1)	Sweden: 1. Linn Persson; 2. Anna Magnusson; 3. Hanna Öberg; 4. Elvira Öberg	Germany: 1. Anna Weidel; 2. Sophia Schneider; 3. Vanessa Voigt; 4. Denise Herrmann-Wick	Norway: 1. Karoline Offigstad Knotten; 2. Ida Lien; 3. Ragnhild Femsteinevik; 4. Ingrid Landmark Tandrevold	Sweden	
2	11 December 2022	(Austria) Hochfilzen (2)	France: 1. Lou Jeanmonnot; 2. Anaïs Chevalier-Bouchet; 3. Chloé Chevalier; 4. Julia Simon	Sweden: 1. Linn Persson; 2. Anna Magnusson; 3. Hanna Öberg; 4. Elvira Öberg	Italy: 1. Rebecca Passler; 2. Dorothea Wierer; 3. Samuela Comola; 4. Lisa Vittozzi	Sweden	
3	14 January 2023	(Germany) Ruhpolding (5)	Norway: 1. Karoline Offigstad Knotten; 2. Ragnhild Femsteinevik; 3. Marte Olsbu Røiseland; 4. Ingrid Landmark Tandrevold	Germany: 1. Anna Weidel; 2. Sophia Schneider; 3. Vanessa Voigt; 4. Denise Herrmann-Wick	Italy: 1. Samuela Comola; 2. Lisa Vittozzi; 3. Rebecca Passler; 4. Dorothea Wierer	Sweden	
4	22 January 2023	(Italy) Antholz-Anterselva (6)	France: 1. Lou Jeanmonnot; 2. Anaïs Chevalier-Bouchet; 3. Chloé Chevalier; 4. Julia Simon	Sweden: 1. Linn Persson; 2. Anna Magnusson; 3. Hanna Öberg; 4. Elvira Öberg	Germany: 1. Vanessa Voigt; 2. Sophia Schneider; 3. Janina Hettich-Walz; 4. Hanna Kebinger	Sweden	
WCH	18 February 2023	(Germany) Oberhof	Italy: 1. Samuela Comola; 2. Dorothea Wierer; 3. Hannah Auchentaller; 4. Lisa Vittozzi	Germany: 1. Vanessa Voigt; 2. Hanna Kebinger; 3. Sophia Schneider; 4. Denise Herrmann-Wick	Sweden: 1. Linn Persson; 2. Anna Magnusson; 3. Elvira Öberg; 4. Hanna Öberg	not included in the World Cup	
5	11 March 2023	(Sweden) Östersund (8)	Norway: 1. Juni Arnekleiv; 2. Ida Lien; 3. Ingrid Landmark Tandrevold; 4. Marte Olsbu Røiseland	France: 1. Lou Jeanmonnot; 2. Chloé Chevalier; 3. Caroline Colombo; 4. Anaïs Chevalier-Bouchet	Germany: 1. Janina Hettich-Walz; 2. Hanna Kebinger; 3. Vanessa Voigt; 4. Denise Herrmann-Wick	France	

=== Overall leaders ===
==== Overall ====
No.	Holder	Date gained	Place	Date forfeited	Place	Number of competitions
1.	(Sweden) Hanna Öberg	30 November 2022	(Finland) Kontiolahti	3 December 2022	(Finland) Kontiolahti	1
2.	(Italy) Lisa Vittozzi	3 December 2022	(Finland) Kontiolahti	8 December 2022	(Austria) Hochfilzen	2
3.	(France) Julia Simon	8 December 2022	(Austria) Hochfilzen	Overall Winner		17

==== Under 25 ====
No.	Holder	Date gained	Place	Date forfeited	Place	Number of competitions
1.	(Sweden) Elvira Öberg	30 November 2022	(Finland) Kontiolahti	U25 Winner		20

=== Standings ===
==== Overall ====
Rank	after all 20 events	Points
Yellow bib	(France) Julia Simon	1093
2	(Italy) Dorothea Wierer	911
3	(Italy) Lisa Vittozzi	882
4	(Germany) Denise Herrmann-Wick	874
5	(Sweden) Elvira Öberg	764
6	(Norway) Ingrid Landmark Tandrevold	731
7	(Sweden) Hanna Öberg	710
8	(France) Anaïs Chevalier-Bouchet	670
9	(Czech Republic) Markéta Davidová	668
10	(Austria) Lisa Theresa Hauser	604

==== Under 25 ====
Rank	after all 20 events	Points
Dark blue bib	(Sweden) Elvira Öberg	764
2	(France) Lou Jeanmonnot	593
3	(France) Sophie Chauveau	321
4	(Austria) Anna Gandler	177
5	(Switzerland) Amy Baserga	157
6	(Italy) Samuela Comola	138
7	(Italy) Rebecca Passler	133
8	(Czech Republic) Tereza Voborníková	109
9	(Bulgaria) Milena Todorova	80
10	(Austria) Anna Juppe	62

==== Individual ====
Rank	after all 3 events	Points
Red bib	(Italy) Lisa Vittozzi	225
2	(France) Julia Simon	155
3	(Sweden) Hanna Öberg	153
4	(Norway) Ingrid Landmark Tandrevold	147
5	(Italy) Dorothea Wierer	143

==== Sprint ====
Rank	after all 7 events	Points
Red bib	(Germany) Denise Herrmann-Wick	400
2	(Italy) Dorothea Wierer	314
3	(France) Julia Simon	295
4	(Sweden) Elvira Öberg	263
5	(Czech Republic) Markéta Davidová	245

==== Pursuit ====
Rank	after all 6 events	Points
Red bib	(France) Julia Simon	373
2	(Sweden) Elvira Öberg	350
3	(Italy) Dorothea Wierer	285
4	(Italy) Lisa Vittozzi	279
5	(Germany) Denise Herrmann-Wick	272

==== Mass start ====
Rank	after all 4 events	Points
Red bib	(France) Julia Simon	270
2	(France) Anaïs Chevalier-Bouchet	206
3	(Sweden) Hanna Öberg	195
4	(Italy) Dorothea Wierer	169
5	(France) Lou Jeanmonnot	166

==== Relay ====
Rank	after all 5 events	Points
1	France	345
2	Norway	325
3	Sweden	321
4	Germany	320
5	Italy	252

==== Nations Cup ====
Rank	after all 24 events	Points
1	France	8128
2	Sweden	7884
3	Norway	7859
4	Germany	7833
5	Italy	7575

== Mixed Relay ==
#	Date	Place (In brackets Stage)	Discipline	Winner	Second	Third	Leader (After competition)	R.
1	8 January 2023	(Slovenia) Pokljuka (4)	6 km + 7.5 km	Norway: 1. Vetle Sjåstad Christiansen; 2. Ingrid Landmark Tandrevold	France: 1. Antonin Guigonnat; 2. Lou Jeanmonnot	Switzerland: 1. Niklas Hartweg; 2. Amy Baserga	Norway	
2	8 January 2023	(Slovenia) Pokljuka (4)	4 x 7.5 km	France: 1. Fabien Claude; 2. Quentin Fillon Maillet; 3. Anaïs Chevalier-Bouchet; 4. Julia Simon	Italy: 1. Didier Bionaz; 2. Tommaso Giacomel; 3. Dorothea Wierer; 4. Lisa Vittozzi	Sweden: 1. Jesper Nelin; 2. Martin Ponsiluoma; 3. Mona Brorsson; 4. Elvira Öberg	France	
WCH	8 February 2023	(Germany) Oberhof	4 x 6 km	Norway: 1. Ingrid Landmark Tandrevold; 2. Marte Olsbu Røiseland; 3. Sturla Holm Lægreid; 4. Johannes Thingnes Bø	Italy: 1. Lisa Vittozzi; 2. Dorothea Wierer; 3. Didier Bionaz; 4. Tommaso Giacomel	France: 1. Julia Simon; 2. Anaïs Chevalier-Bouchet; 3. Emilien Jacquelin; 4. Quentin Fillon Maillet	not included in the World Cup	
WCH	16 February 2023	(Germany) Oberhof	6 km + 7.5 km	Norway: 1. Johannes Thingnes Boe; 2. Marte Olsbu Røiseland	Austria: 1. David Komatz; 2. Lisa Theresa Hauser	Italy: 1. Tommaso Giacomel; 2. Lisa Vittozzi	not included in the World Cup	
3	5 March 2023	(Czech Republic) Nové Město (7)	4 x 6 km	France: 1. Lou Jeanmonnot; 2. Caroline Colombo; 3. Éric Perrot; 4. Fabien Claude	Sweden: 1. Anna Magnusson; 2. Hanna Öberg; 3. Martin Ponsiluoma; 4. Sebastian Samuelsson	Norway: 1. Karoline Offigstad Knotten; 2. Ingrid Landmark Tandrevold; 3. Johannes Dale; 4. Endre Strømsheim	France	
4	5 March 2023	(Czech Republic) Nové Město (7)	6 km + 7.5 km	Norway: 1. Marte Olsbu Røiseland; 2. Vetle Sjåstad Christiansen	Switzerland: 1. Amy Baserga; 2. Niklas Hartweg	Latvia: 1. Baiba Bendika; 2. Andrejs Rastorgujevs	France	

=== Rankings ===
Rank	after all 4 events	Points
1	France	305
2	Norway	280
3	Switzerland	217
4	Sweden	198
5	Italy	173

== Podium table by nation ==
Table showing the World Cup podium places (gold–1st place, silver–2nd place, bronze–3rd place) by the countries represented by the athletes.

Rank	Nation	Gold	Silver	Bronze	Total
1	Norway	30	18	13	61
2	Sweden	8	8	8	24
3	France	7	12	15	34
4	Italy	4	9	4	17
5	Germany	4	4	11	19
6	Austria	2	0	0	2
7	Switzerland	0	3	1	4
8	Czech Republic	0	1	1	2
9	Latvia	0	0	1	1
9	Slovenia	0	0	1	1
Totals (10 entries)		55	55	55	165

== Points distribution ==
The table shows the number of points won in the 2022–23 Biathlon World Cup for men and women. Relay events do not impact individual rankings.

Place	1	2	3	4	5	6	7	8	9	10	11	12	13	14	15	16	17	18	19	20	21	22	23	24	25	26	27	28	29	30	31	32	33	34	35	36	37	38	39	40
Individual	90	75	60	50	45	40	36	34	32	31	30	29	28	27	26	25	24	23	22	21	20	19	18	17	16	15	14	13	12	11	10	9	8	7	6	5	4	3	2	1
Sprint	90	75	60	50	45	40	36	34	32	31	30	29	28	27	26	25	24	23	22	21	20	19	18	17	16	15	14	13	12	11	10	9	8	7	6	5	4	3	2	1
Pursuit	90	75	60	50	45	40	36	34	32	31	30	29	28	27	26	25	24	23	22	21	20	19	18	17	16	15	14	13	12	11	10	9	8	7	6	5	4	3	2	1
Mass Start	90	75	60	50	45	40	36	34	32	31	30	29	28	27	26	25	24	23	22	21	20	18	16	14	12	10	8	6	4	2

== Achievements ==
First World Cup career victory

Men

Women

- (Sweden) Anna Magnusson (27), in her 9th season – Stage 3 Sprint in Annecy-Le Grand-Bornand

First World Cup podium

Men

- (Switzerland) Niklas Hartweg (22), in his 3rd season – Stage 1 Individual in Kontiolahti – 2nd place
- (Italy) Tommaso Giacomel (22), in his 4th season – Stage 8 Individual in Östersund – 2nd place
- (Germany) David Zobel (26), in his 3rd season – Stage 1 Individual in Kontiolahti – 3rd place
- (France) Éric Perrot (21), in his 3rd season – Stage 8 Mass Start in Östersund – 3rd place

Women

- (Sweden) Anna Magnusson (27), in her 9th season – Stage 3 Sprint in Annecy-Le Grand-Bornand – 1st place
- (France) Lou Jeanmonnot (24), in her 3rd season – Stage 5 Individual in Ruhpolding – 2nd place
- (France) Chloé Chevalier (27), in her 7th season – Stage 6 Sprint in Antholz-Anterselva – 2nd place

Team
Mixed

- Switzerland – no. 3 in Stage 4 Single Mixed Relay in Pokljuka
- Latvia – no. 3 in Stage 7 Single Mixed Relay in Nové Město

Number of wins this season (in brackets are all-time wins)

Men

- (Norway) Johannes Thingnes Bø – 16 (68)
- (Norway) Sturla Holm Lægreid – 1 (10)
- (Norway) Vetle Sjåstad Christiansen – 1 (4)
- (Germany) Benedikt Doll – 1 (4)
- (Norway) Johannes Dale – 1 (2)
- (Sweden) Martin Ponsiluoma – 1 (2)

Women

- (Italy) Dorothea Wierer – 3 (16)
- (Germany) Denise Herrmann-Wick – 3 (11)
- (Sweden) Elvira Öberg – 3 (7)
- (France) Julia Simon – 3 (7)
- (Norway) Marte Olsbu Røiseland – 2 (17)
- (Sweden) Hanna Öberg – 2 (8)
- (Austria) Lisa Theresa Hauser – 2 (5)
- (Italy) Lisa Vittozzi – 1 (3)
- (Sweden) Anna Magnusson – 1 (1)

== Retirements ==
The following notable biathletes retired during or after the 2022–23 season:

Men

- (Austria) Lucas Pitzer
- (Canada) Jules Burnotte
- (Japan) Shohei Kodama
- (Kazakhstan) Sergey Sirik
- (Norway) Aleksander Fjeld Andersen
- (Norway) Erlend Bjøntegaard
- (Norway) Sindre Pettersen
- (Poland) Grzegorz Guzik
- (Russia) Ilia Gavrilov
- (Russia) Semen Suchilov
- (Slovakia) Tomáš Hasilla
- (Slovakia) Michal Šíma
- (Slovenia) Rok Tršan
- (Switzerland) Laurin Fravi
- (Switzerland) Serafin Wiestner
- (Sweden) Gabriel Stegmayr

Women

- (Austria) Katharina Komatz
- (Finland) Mari Eder
- (Finland) Nastassia Kinnunen
- (Finland) Sanna Laari
- (France) Anaïs Chevalier-Bouchet
- (Germany) Denise Herrmann-Wick
- (Germany) Vanessa Hinz
- (Italy) Eleonora Fauner
- (Italy) Federica Sanfilippo
- (Japan) Asuka Hachisuka
- (Japan) Fuyuko Tachizaki
- (Kazakhstan) Lyudmila Akhatova
- (Kazakhstan) Alina Raikova
- (Lithuania) Gabrielė Leščinskaitė
- (Norway) Tiril Eckhoff
- (Norway) Marte Olsbu Røiseland
- (Poland) Magdalena Gwizdoń
- (Poland) Kinga Zbylut
- (Russia) Ekaterina Glazyrina
- (Slovenia) Tais Vozelj
- (Slovakia) Ivona Fialková
- (Slovakia) Henrieta Horvatova
- (Switzerland) Ladina Meier-Ruge

== See also ==
- 2022–23 Biathlon IBU Cup
