= 2022–23 Biathlon World Cup – Stage 5 =

2022–23 Biathlon World Cup Stage

The 2022–23 Biathlon World Cup – Stage 5 was the fifth event of the season and was held in Ruhpolding, Germany, from 11 to 15 January 2023.

== Schedule of events ==
The events took place at the following times.

Date	Time	Events
11 January	14:10 CET	Men's 20 km Individual
12 January	14:10 CET	Women's 15 km Individual
13 January	14:25 CET	4 x 7.5 km Men's Relay
14 January	14:25 CET	4 x 6 km Women's Relay
15 January	12:30 CET	Men's 15 km Mass Start
15 January	14:45 CET	Women's 12.5 km Mass Start

== Medal winners ==
=== Men ===
Event:	Gold:	Time	Silver:	Time	Bronze:	Time
20 km Individual details	Johannes Thingnes Bø; Norway	48:48.4 (1+0+0+1)	Vetle Sjåstad Christiansen; Norway	48:58.3 (0+0+0+1)	Jakov Fak; Slovenia	49:17.7 (0+0+0+0)
4 x 7,5 km Men Relay details	Norway; Sturla Holm Lægreid; Tarjei Bø; Vetle Sjåstad Christiansen; Johannes Thingnes Bø	1:10:51.4 (0+0) (1+3) (0+1) (0+0) (0+0) (0+1) (0+0) (0+2)	Germany; David Zobel; Johannes Kühn; Benedikt Doll; Roman Rees	1:11:11.5 (0+0) (0+1) (0+0) (0+1) (0+0) (0+1) (0+1) (0+0)	France; Éric Perrot; Quentin Fillon Maillet; Antonin Guigonnat; Fabien Claude	1:11:47.0 (0+0) (0+0) (0+0) (0+1) (0+0) (1+3) (0+3) (0+0)
15 km Mass Start details	Johannes Thingnes Bø; Norway	36:12.0 (1+0+1+1)	Vetle Sjåstad Christiansen; Norway	36:31.3 (1+0+1+0)	Sturla Holm Lægreid; Norway	36:47.3 (1+0+1+0)

=== Women ===
Event:	Gold:	Time	Silver:	Time	Bronze:	Time
15 km Individual details	Lisa Vittozzi; Italy	40:05.9 (0+0+0+0)	Lou Jeanmonnot; France	40:44.9 (0+0+0+0)	Julia Simon; France	40:51.1 (0+0+0+1)
4 x 6 km Women Relay details	Norway; Karoline Offigstad Knotten; Ragnhild Femsteinveik; Marte Olsbu Røiseland; Ingrid Landmark Tandrevold	1:08:17.3 (0+0) (0+0) (0+3) (0+3) (0+0) (0+0) (0+0) (0+0)	Germany; Anna Weidel; Sophia Schneider; Vanessa Voigt; Denise Herrmann-Wick	1:08:32.6 (0+3) (0+1) (0+0) (0+0) (0+2) (0+2) (0+1) (0+1)	Italy; Samuela Comola; Lisa Vittozzi; Rebecca Passler; Dorothea Wierer	1:08:50.8 (0+0) (0+0) (0+0) (0+2) (0+1) (0+0) (0+0) (0+1)
12.5 km Mass Start details	Julia Simon; France	32:52.0 (1+0+1+1)	Lisa Vittozzi; Italy	32:54.6 (0+0+1+0)	Anaïs Chevalier-Bouchet; France	32:58.7 (0+1+0+0)
