= Rebecca Passler =

Italian biathlete (born 2001)

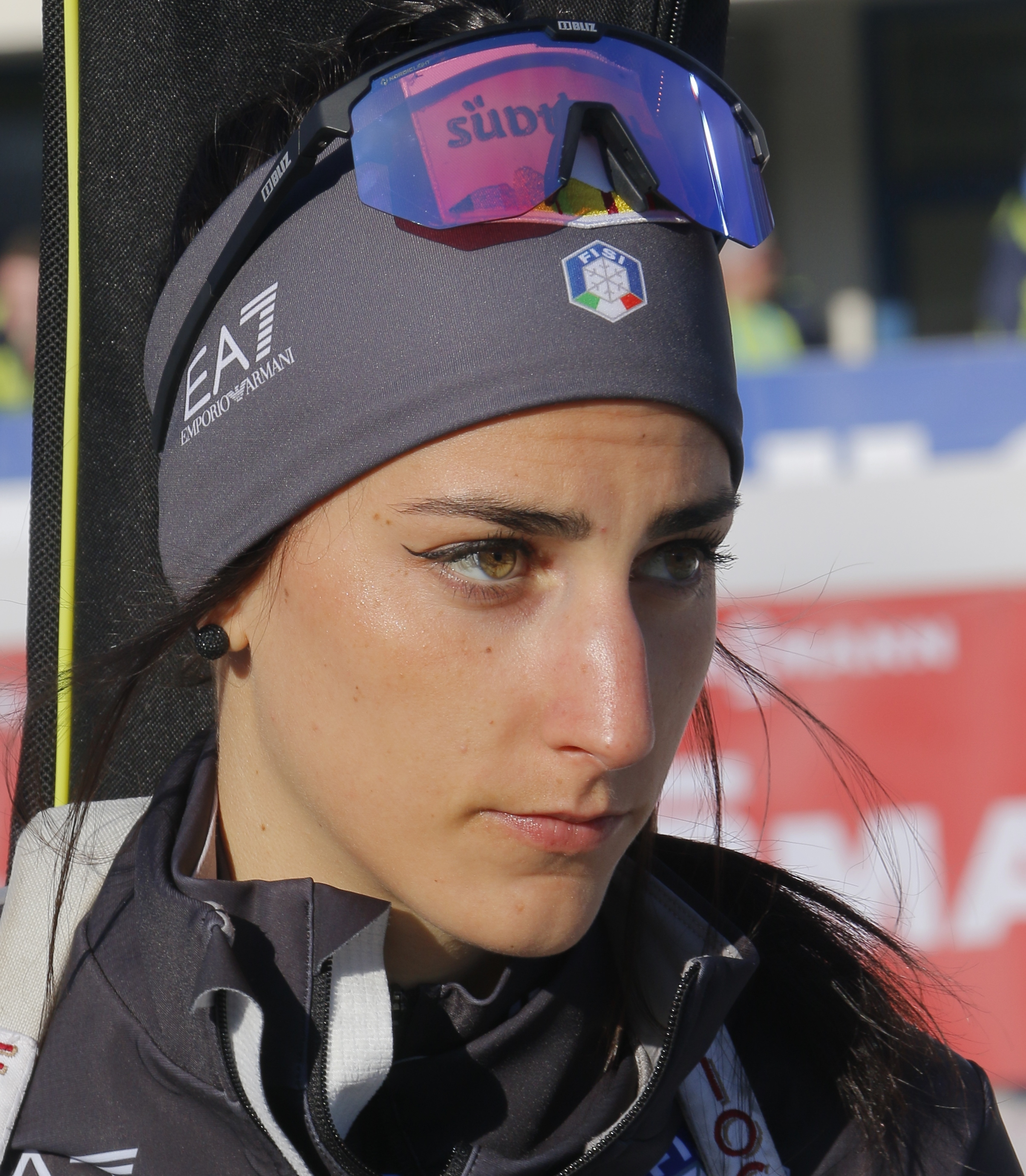
- Rebecca Passler (2023)

Personal information
- Nationality: Italian
- Born: 31 August 2001 (age 24) Bruneck

Sport

Professional information
- Sport: Biathlon
- Club: CS Carabinieri
- World Cup debut: 2021

World Championships
- Teams: 1 (2023–)
Medal record
Women's biathlon
Representing Italy
Event	1st	2nd	3rd
Olympic Games	0	0	0
World Championships	0	0	0
Total	0	0	0
European Championships
Bronze medal – third place	2025 Val Martello	4 × 6 km relay
Junior World Championships
Gold medal – first place	2022 Soldier Hollow	4 × 6 km relay
Silver medal – second place	2021 Obertilliach	7.5 km sprint
Silver medal – second place	2021 Obertilliach	4 × 6 km relay
Silver medal – second place	2022 Soldier Hollow	7.5 km sprint
Bronze medal – third place	2021 Obertilliach	10 km pursuit
Youth World Championships
Silver medal – second place	2020 Lenzerheide	6 km sprint
Silver medal – second place	2020 Lenzerheide	3 × 6 km relay

Rebecca Passler (born 31 August 2001) is an Italian biathlete. She competes in the Biathlon World Cup, where she debuted at 2021–22 season. Her uncle is a former biathlete, relay world champion and Olympic medalist Johann Passler.

== Career ==
Through her family, she started her biathlon at an early age and won several competitions in the Italian junior division. At the 2019/20 season, she competed in four races at the World Youth Championships and made her debut in the IBU Junior Cup, where she finished on the podium once in the sprint and twice in the single mixed relay with Michele Molinari. During the season, she won two silver medals at the Youth World Championships 2020 in Lenzerheide in the 10-kilometer individual race and relay race with Hannah Auchentaller and Linda Zingerle.

In January 2021, at the age of 19, Passler made her debut in the IBU Cup, the second-highest competition series in international biathlon. She stood on the podium in the single mixed relay with Daniele Cappellari in Arber, Germany. Passler excelled in junior competitions, winning numerous medals at the Junior World Championships. On 27 November 2021 she made her World Cup debut in Östersund, finishing 94th in the individual race. Then, she subsequently demoted back to the IBU Cup. Passler placed 17th in the sprint competition on 3 December 2022, scoring first points. On 11 December she received her career first IBU World cup medal in the women's relay race in Hochfilzen, Austria. One month later, she also won a bronze medal along with Comola, Wierer, and Vittozzi in the relay competition in Ruhpolding, Germany.

For an eleven day period in February 2026 and partially during the 2026 Winter Olympics, Passler served a provisional suspension and was excluded from the Italian team after testing positive for letrozole and methanol. The suspension was lifted after Passler's explanation of the positive test being due to contanimation with a shared eating utensil was accepted by both the Italian Anti-Doping Organization and World Anti-Doping Agency.

== Biathlon results ==
All results are sourced from the International Biathlon Union. Updated on 30 March 2023

=== World Championships ===
Year	Age	Individual	Sprint	Pursuit	Mass start	Relay	Mixed relay	Single mixed relay
(Germany) 2023 Oberhof	21	28th	34th	45th	–	–	–	–

=== Youth and Junior World Championships ===
Year	Age	Individual	Sprint	Pursuit	Relay
(Switzerland) 2020 Lenzerheide	18	Silver	13th	9th	Silver
(Austria) 2021 Obertilliach	19	10th	Silver	Bronze	Silver
(United States) 2022 Soldier Hollow	20	14th	Silver	12th	Gold

=== World Cup ===
Season	Age	Overall		Individual		Sprint		Pursuit		Mass start	
Season	Age	Points	Position	Points	Position	Points	Position	Points	Position	Points	Position
2021–22	20	—N/a	NC	—N/a	NC	—N/a	NC	—N/a	—N/a	—N/a	—N/a
2022–23	21	133	39th	12	53rd	61	36th	60	32nd	NC	—N/a

==== Relay podiums ====
No.	Season	Date	Location	Level	Placement	Teammate
1	2022–23	11 December 2022	(Austria) Hochfilzen	World Cup	3rd	Comola, Vittozzi, Wierer
2	2022–23	14 January 2023	(Germany) Ruhpolding	World Cup	3rd	Comola, Vittozzi, Wierer
