= David Zobel =

German biathlete (born 1996)

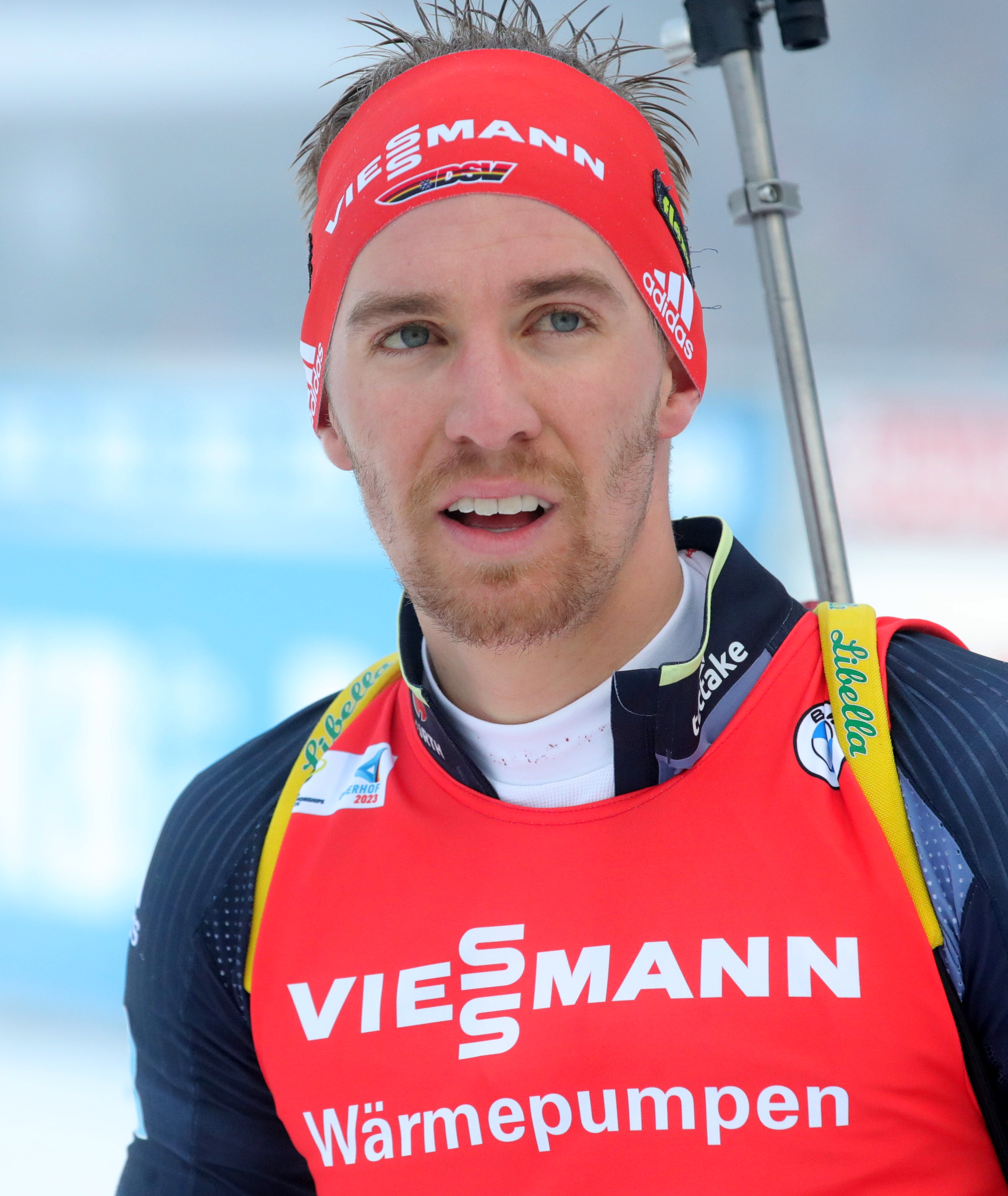
- Zobel in 2023

Personal information
- Nationality: German
- Born: 11 June 1996 (age 30) Starnberg, Germany
- Height: 1.78 m (5 ft 10 in)
- Weight: 71 kg (157 lb)

Sport

Professional information
- Sport: Biathlon
- Club: SC Partenkirchen
- World Cup debut: 2021

World Championships
- Teams: 2 (2023, 2025)
- Medals: 0 (0 gold)

World Cup
- Seasons: 5 (2020/21–)
- Individual podiums: 1
- All podiums: 7
Medal record
Men's biathlon
Representing Germany
European Championships
| Silver medal – second place | 2025 Val Martello | 4 × 7.5 km relay |
Junior World Championships
| Silver medal – second place | 2016 Cheile Grădiştei | 4 × 7.5 km relay |
| Silver medal – second place | 2017 Osrblie | Individual |
| Bronze medal – third place | 2016 Cheile Grădiştei | Sprint |
| Bronze medal – third place | 2017 Osrblie | 4 × 7.5 km relay |
- Updated on 3 February 2024

David Zobel (born 11 June 1996) is a German biathlete. He made his Biathlon World Cup debut in 2021 in Östersund.

== Career ==
For most of the seasons from 2017 to 2021, Zobel ran in the IBU Cup, the 2nd highest competition series in international biathlon. He celebrated his first individual victory in March 2019 in Otepää in a sprint race, after previously failing to achieve a result among the top 60 at the European Championships in Minsk-Raubichi. In February 2021, he was on the podium again in a German double victory behind Philipp Nawrath as 2nd in the sprint in Brezno-Orsblie. A month later he was nominated for the World Cup for the first time at the season finale in Östersund and won his first World Cup points in the pursuit by finishing 32nd.

In 2021, Zobel was involved in the World Cup races in Ruhpolding and Antholz. The German national coach Mark Kirchner nominated him as a substitute for the 2022 Winter Olympics in Beijing, where he was not used. The German Ski Association assigned him back to the perspective squad in the eight-person course group 1a.

In the winter of 2022–23, Zobel started consistently in the World Cup for the first time. At the season opener in Kontiolahti he remained clean in the 20-kilometer individual race and came 3rd behind Martin Ponsiluoma and Niklas Hartweg. As the season progressed, Zobel reached the podium twice with the German relay team and ended the winter in 24th place in the overall World Cup rankings.

== Biathlon results ==
All results are sourced from the International Biathlon Union.

0 medals

| Event | Individual | Sprint | Pursuit | Mass start | Relay | Mixed relay |
|---|---|---|---|---|---|---|
| (Italy) 2026 Milano Cortina | 21st | 19th | 23rd | 24th | 4th | — |

=== World Championships ===
| Event | Individual | Sprint | Pursuit | Mass Start | Relay | Mixed Relay | Single mixed relay |
|---|---|---|---|---|---|---|---|
| (Germany) 2023 Oberhof | 73rd | 35th | 41st | — | — | — | — |
| (Switzerland) 2025 Lenzerheide | 28th | — | — | — | — | — | — |

=== World Cup ===
| Season | Overall | | | Individual | | Sprint | | Pursuit | | Mass start | |
| Season | Races | Points | Position | Points | Position | Points | Position | Points | Position | Points | Position |
|---|---|---|---|---|---|---|---|---|---|---|---|
| 2020–21 | 2/23 | 9 | 87th | — | — | — | — | 9 | 68th | — | — |
| 2021–22 | 9/22 | 171 | 33rd | 10 | 49th | 56 | 43th | 71 | 32nd | 34 | 29th |
| 2022–23 | 20/21 | 336 | 24th | 78 | 11th | 77 | 29th | 95 | 25th | 86 | 17th |
| 2023–24 | 8/21 | 126 | 33rd | — | — | 28 | 40th | 62 | 26th | 36 | 19th |

=== Individual podiums ===
| No. | Season | Date | Location | Race | Level | Placement |
|---|---|---|---|---|---|---|
| 1 | 2022–23 | 29 November 2022 | Kontiolahti, Finland | 20 km Individual | World Cup | 3rd |

=== Relay podiums ===
| No. | Season | Date | Location | Race | Level | Placement | Teammate |
|---|---|---|---|---|---|---|---|
| 1 | 2021–22 | 23 January 2022 | (Italy) Antholz | Relay | Biathlon World Cup | 3rd | Kühn / Doll / Rees |
| 2 | 2022–23 | 13 January 2023 | (Germany) Ruhpolding | Relay | Biathlon World Cup | 2nd | Kühn / Doll / Rees |
| 3 | 2022–23 | 22 January 2023 | (Italy) Antholz | Relay | Biathlon World Cup | 3rd | Kühn / Doll / Rees |
| 4 | 2023–24 | 30 November 2023 | (Sweden) Östersund | Relay | Biathlon World Cup | 3rd | Nawrath / Doll / Kühn |
| 5 | 2023–24 | 10 December 2023 | (Austria) Hochfilzen | Relay | Biathlon World Cup | 3rd | Kühn / Nawrath / Doll |
