= Niklas Hartweg =

Swiss biathlete (born 2000)

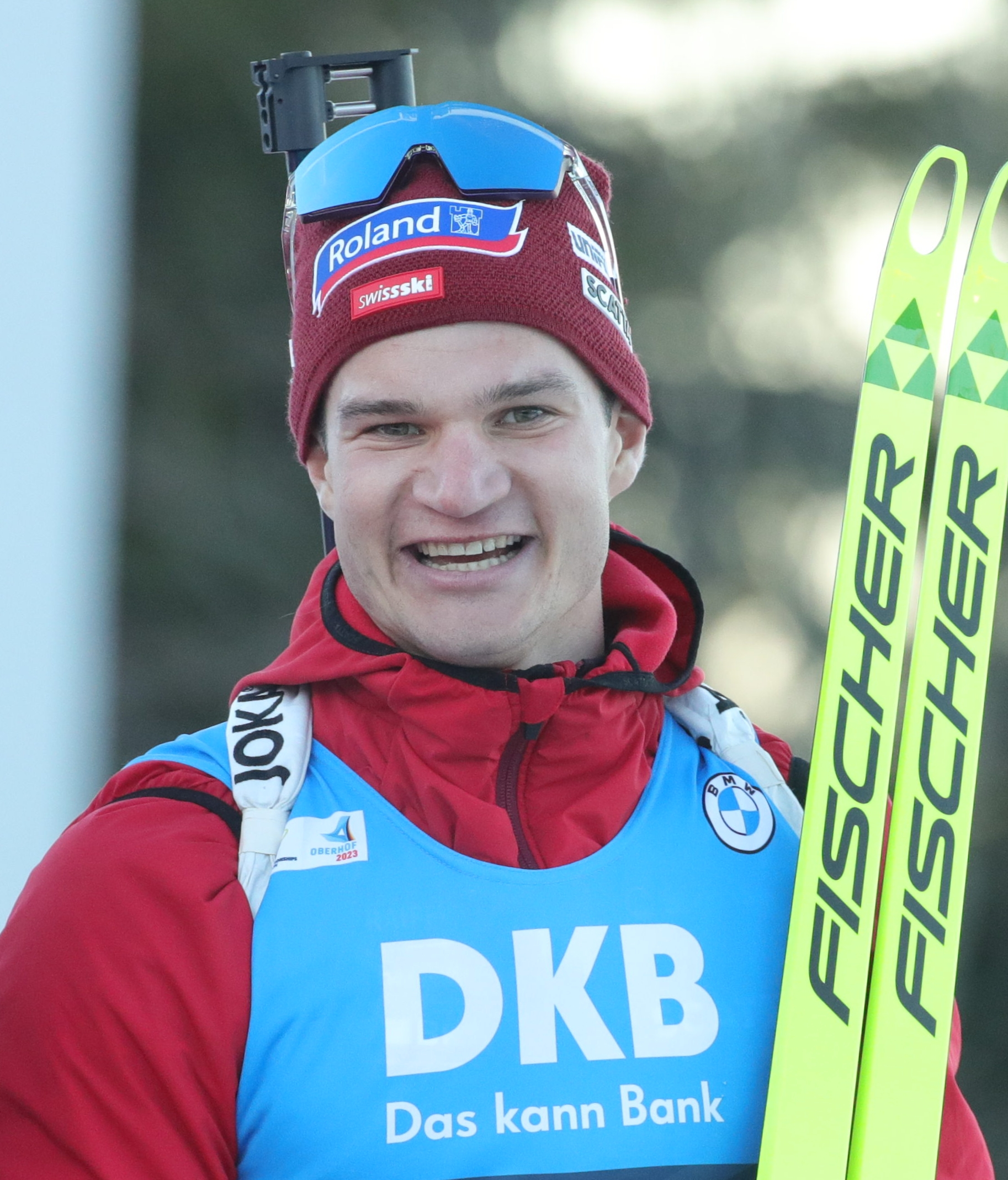
- Hartweg in 2023

Personal information
- Nationality: Swiss
- Born: 1 March 2000 (age 26) Karlsruhe, Germany

Sport
- Sport: Biathlon
Medal record
Men's biathlon
Representing Switzerland
European Championships
Silver medal – second place	2023 Lenzerheide	Single mixed relay
Youth World Championships
Gold medal – first place	2019 Osrblie	12.5 km individual

Niklas Hartweg (born 1 March 2000) is a Swiss biathlete.

== Career results ==
=== Olympic Games ===
0 medals

Event	Individual	Sprint	Pursuit	Mass start	Relay	Mixed relay
(China) 2022 Beijing	56th	37th	38th	—	12th	—
(Italy) 2026 Milano Cortina	59th	17th	27th	24th	8th	10th

=== World Championships ===
0 medals

Event	Individual	Sprint	Pursuit	Mass start	Relay	Mixed relay	Single mixed relay
(Slovenia) 2021 Pokljuka	—	49th	47th	—	11th	—	—
(Germany) 2023 Oberhof	6th	25th	17th	—	6th	7th	12th
(Czech Republic) 2024 Nové Město na Moravě	11th	22nd	22nd	22nd	14th	4th	5th
(Switzerland) 2025 Lenzerheide	5th	19th	18th	17th	7th	6th	4th

==== Podiums ====
Season	Place	Competition	Placement
2022–23	(Finland) Kontiolahti	Individual	2nd
2022–23	(Norway) Oslo Holmenkollen	Mass start	2nd
