= Samuela Comola =

Italian biathlete (born 1998)

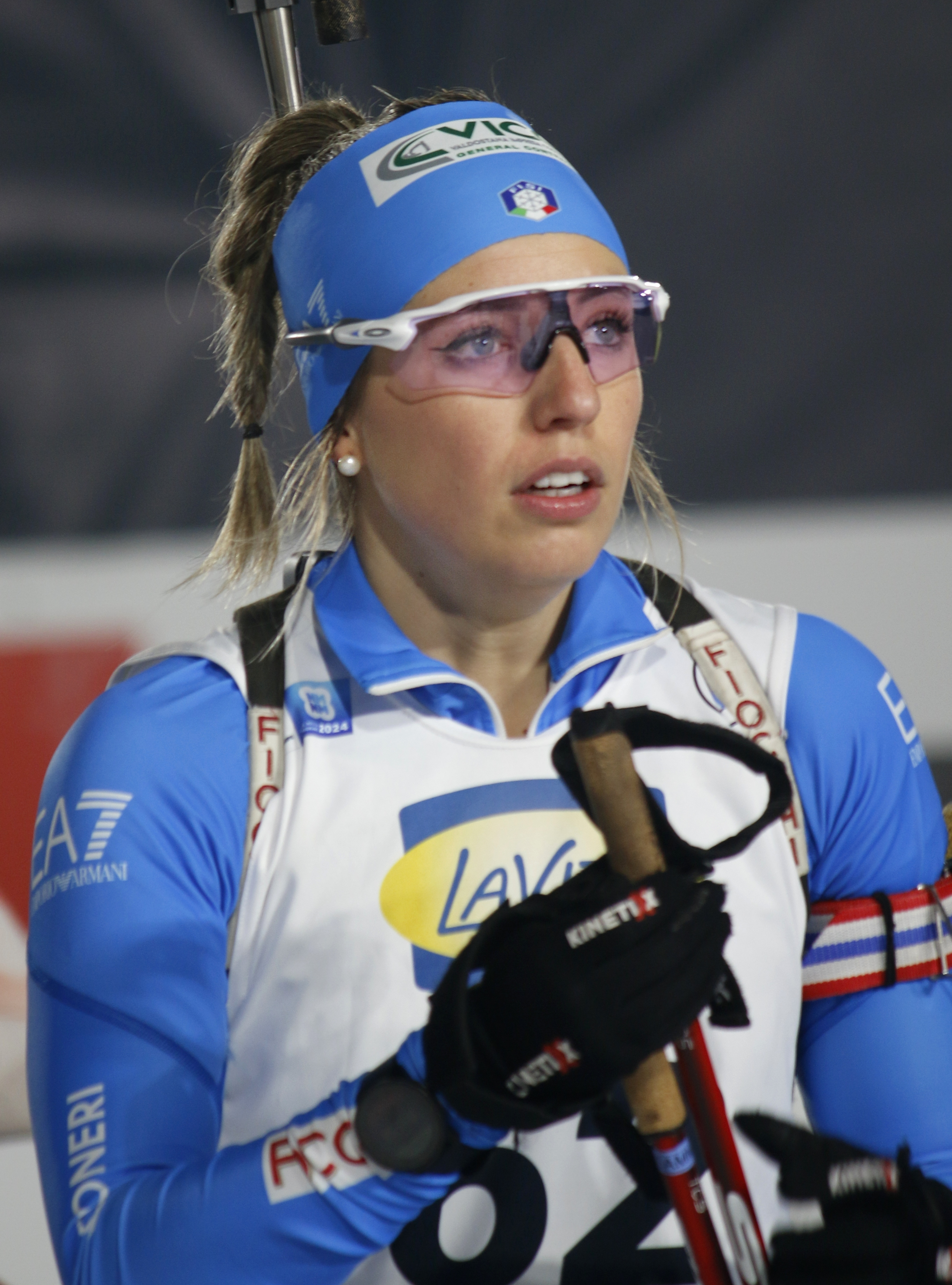
- Comola in 2024

Personal information
- Nationality: Italian
- Born: 30 April 1998 (age 28) Aosta, Italy

Sport

Professional information
- Sport: Biathlon
- Club: CS Esercito
- World Cup debut: 2022

Olympic Games
- Teams: 1

World Championships
- Teams: 2 (2023–)
- Medals: 1 (1 gold)
Medal record
Women's biathlon
Representing Italy
| Event | 1st | 2nd | 3rd |
|---|---|---|---|
| Olympic Games | 0 | 0 | 0 |
| World Championships | 1 | 0 | 0 |
| Total | 1 | 0 | 0 |
World Championships
| Gold medal – first place | 2023 Oberhof | 4 × 6 km relay |

Samuela Comola (born 30 April 1998 in Aosta) is an Italian biathlete.

Comola started her biathlon career in 2009. In 2016, she competed at the Winter Youth Olympic Games. She also participated at the 2017 IBU Youth World Championships. Comola made her debut race in the World Cup during the 2021–22 Biathlon World Cup season (on November 27, 2021) in Östersund (64th in the individual). She competed at the Winter Olympic Games in Beijing 2022 in women's sprint, pursuit, and team relay races. On March 3, 2022, in Kontiolahti she secured her career first podium in the World Cup (3rd in the relay with Dorothea Wierer, Federica Sanfilippo and Lisa Vittozzi). At the Biathlon World Championships 2023 in Oberhof, she won the gold medal in the relay with Dorothea Wierer, Hannah Auchentaller and Lisa Vittozzi.

== Biathlon results ==
All results are sourced from the International Biathlon Union. Updated on 30 March 2023

=== Olympic Games ===
| Year | Age | Individual | Sprint | Pursuit | Mass start | Relay | Mixed relay | Single mixed relay |
|---|---|---|---|---|---|---|---|---|
| (China) 2022 Beijing | 23 | — | 57th | 37th | — | 5th | — | |

=== World Championships ===
| Year | Age | Individual | Sprint | Pursuit | Mass start | Relay | Mixed relay | Single mixed relay |
|---|---|---|---|---|---|---|---|---|
| (Germany) 2023 Oberhof | 24 | 4th | 46th | 42nd | 10th | Gold | — | — |
| (Czech Republic) 2024 Nové Město na Moravě | 25 | 21st | 37th | 23rd | — | 11th | — | — |
| (Switzerland) 2025 Lenzerheide | 26 | 15th | — | — | — | 7th | — | — |

=== World Cup ===
| Season | Age | Overall | | Individual | | Sprint | | Pursuit | | Mass start | |
| Season | Age | Points | Position | Points | Position | Points | Position | Points | Position | Points | Position |
|---|---|---|---|---|---|---|---|---|---|---|---|
| 2021–22 | 22 | 18 | 87th | NC | —N/a | 3 | 87th | 15 | 91st | NC | —N/a |
| 2021–22 | 23 | 138 | 37th | 16 | 49th | 47 | 45th | 75 | 25th | NC | —N/a |

==== Relay podiums ====
| No. | Season | Date | Location | Level | Placement | Teammate |
|---|---|---|---|---|---|---|
| 1 | 2021–22 | 3 March 2022 | (Finland) Kontiolahti | World Cup | 3rd | Vittozzi, Sanfilippo, Wierer |
| 2 | 2022–23 | 11 December 2022 | (Austria) Hochfilzen | World Cup | 3rd | Passler, Vittozzi, Wierer |
| 3 | 2022–23 | 14 January 2023 | (Germany) Ruhpolding | World Cup | 3rd | Passler, Vittozzi, Wierer |
| 4 | 2022–23 | 18 February 2023 | (Germany) Oberhof | World Championships | Gold | Auchentaller, Wierer, Vittozzi |
