= Chloé Chevalier =

French biathlete (born 1995)

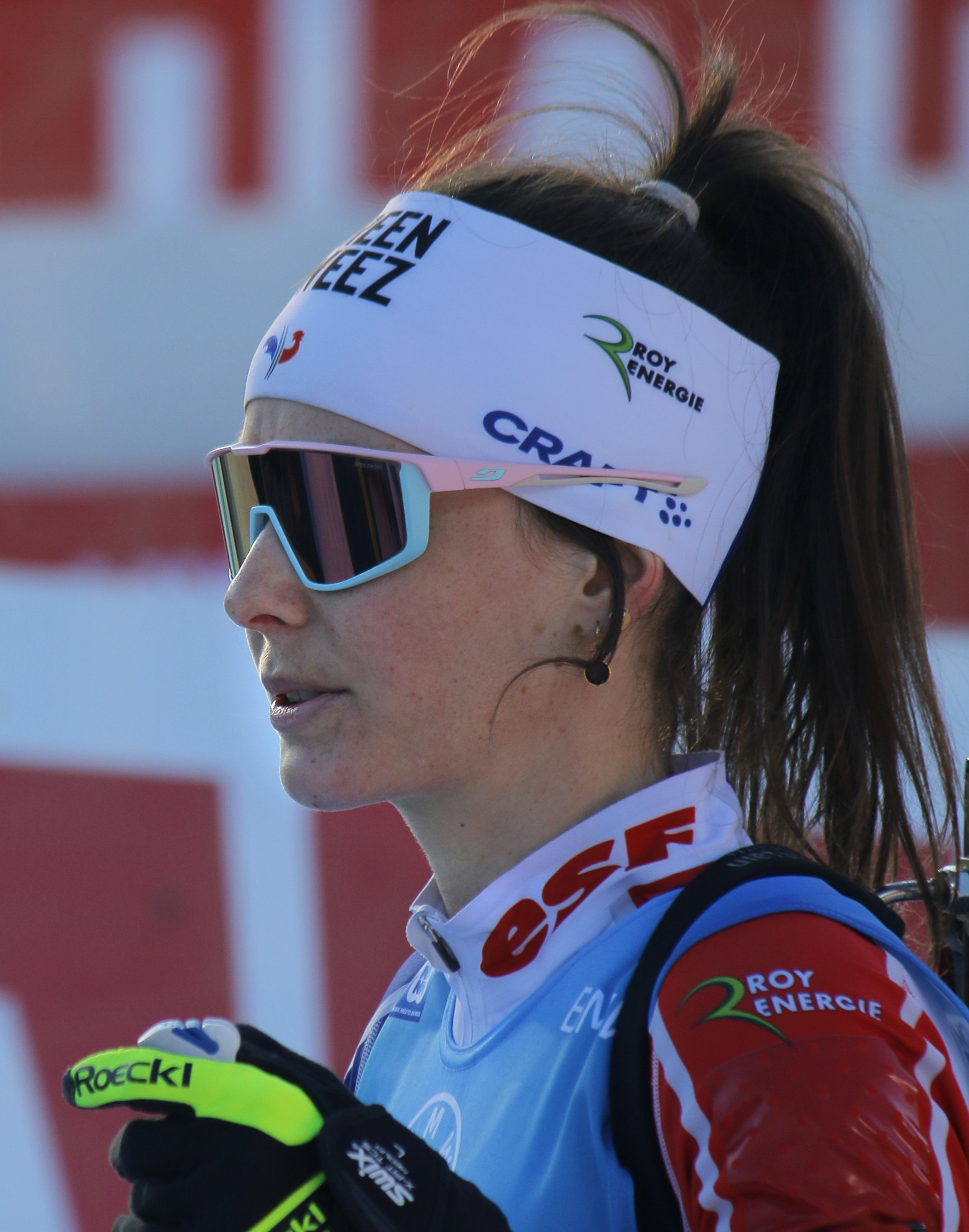

Personal information
- Nationality: French
- Born: 2 November 1995 (age 30) Saint-Martin-d'Hères, France
- Height: 1.73 m (5 ft 8 in)
- Weight: 55 kg (121 lb)

Sport

Professional information
- Sport: Biathlon
- Club: Les 7 Laux
- World Cup debut: 2015

World Championships
- Teams: 2 (2021–2023)

World Cup
- Seasons: 8 (2015/2016; 2017/18–)
- All victories: 3
Medal record
Women's biathlon
Representing France
Junior World Championships
Gold medal – first place	2015 Raubichi	3 × 6 km relay
Bronze medal – third place	2016 Cheile Grădiştei	10 km pursuit
Bronze medal – third place	2015 Raubichi	7.5 km sprint

Chloé Chevalier (born 2 November 1995) is a former French biathlete. She had competed in the Biathlon World Cup since 2017. She is the younger sister of fellow biathlete Anaïs Chevalier.

== Biathlon results ==
=== Olympic Games ===
Event	Individual	Sprint	Pursuit	Mass start	Relay	Mixed relay
(China) 2022 Beijing	(did not race / selected as an alternate)					

=== World Championships ===
Event	Individual	Sprint	Pursuit	Mass start	Relay	Mixed relay	Single mixed relay
(Slovenia) 2021 Pokljuka	—	—	—	—	8th	—	—
(Germany) 2023 Oberhof	33rd	15th	19th	13th	4th	—	—

=== World Cup ===
World Cup rankings

Season	Overall		Individual		Sprint		Pursuit		Mass start	
Season	Points	Position	Points	Position	Points	Position	Points	Position	Points	Position
2015–16	-	not ranked	-	-	-	not ranked	-	-	-	-
2016–17	(did not compete in World Cup)									
2017–18	-	73rd	-	34th	-	not ranked	-	75th	-	-
2018–19	-	101st	-	-	-	92nd	-	not ranked	-	-
2019–20	-	53rd	-	48th	-	50th	-	54th	-	-
2020–21	-	40th	-	65th	-	27th	-	43rd	-	48th
2021–22	-	22nd	-	30th	-	19th	-	34th	-	21st
2022–23	-	16th	-	11th	-	13th	-	20th	-	11th

Relay victories

3 victories

No.	Season	Date	Location	Discipline	Level	Team
1	2021–22	14 January 2022	(Germany) Ruhpolding	Relay	Biathlon World Cup	Chevalier / C.Chevalier / Braisaz / Simon
2	2022–23	11 December 2022	(Austria) Hochfilzen	Relay	Biathlon World Cup	Jeanmonnot / Chevalier / C.Chevalier / Simon
3	2022–23	22 January 2023	(Italy) Antholz-Anterselva	Relay	Biathlon World Cup	Jeanmonnot / Chevalier / C.Chevalier / Simon
