= Ingrid Landmark Tandrevold =

Norwegian biathlete (born 1996)

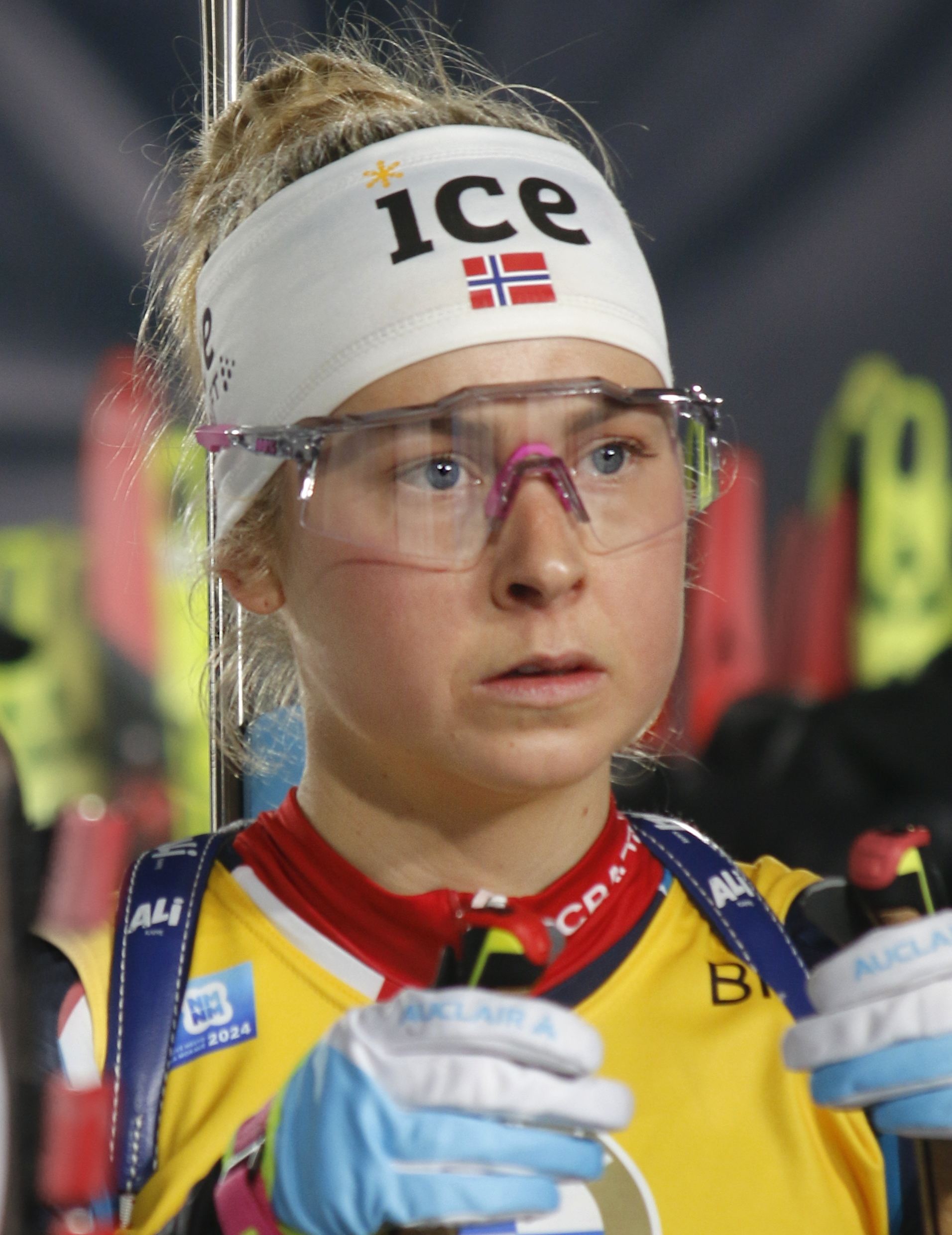
- Ingrid Landmark Tandrevold in 2024

Personal information
- Nationality: Norwegian
- Born: 23 September 1996 (age 29) Bærum, Norway
- Height: 1.66 m (5 ft 5 in)

Sport
- Coached by: Sverre Huber Kaas; Patrick Oberegger

Professional information
- Sport: Biathlon
- Club: Fossum IF
- World Cup debut: 2016

Olympic Games
- Teams: 3 (2018, 2022, 2026)
- Medals: 0 (0 gold)

World Championships
- Teams: 6 (2019–2025)
- Medals: 11 (4 gold)

World Cup
- Seasons: 11 (2015/16–)
- Individual races: 201
- All races: 272
- Individual victories: 5
- All victories: 27
- Individual podiums: 24
- All podiums: 69
- Discipline titles: 2: 1 Mass Start (2020–21); 1 Sprint (2023–24)
Medal record
Women's biathlon
Representing Norway
Event	1st	2nd	3rd
Olympic Games	0	0	0
World Championships	4	5	2
European Championships	0	1	3
Junior World Championships	2	1	1
Youth World Championships	1	1	2
Total	7	8	8
World Championships
Gold medal – first place	2019 Östersund	4 x 6 km relay
Gold medal – first place	2020 Antholz	4 x 6 km relay
Gold medal – first place	2021 Pokljuka	4 x 6 km relay
Gold medal – first place	2023 Oberhof	Mixed relay
Silver medal – second place	2019 Östersund	7.5 km sprint
Silver medal – second place	2021 Pokljuka	12.5 km mass start
Silver medal – second place	2023 Oberhof	12.5 km mass start
Silver medal – second place	2024 Nové Město na Moravě	Mixed relay
Silver medal – second place	2025 Lenzerheide	4 × 6 km relay
Bronze medal – third place	2021 Pokljuka	15 km individual
Bronze medal – third place	2024 Nové Město na Moravě	Single mixed relay
European Championships
Silver medal – second place	2017 Duszniki-Zdrój	Single mixed relay
Bronze medal – third place	2016 Tyumen	10 km pursuit
Bronze medal – third place	2016 Tyumen	12.5 mass start
Bronze medal – third place	2016 Tyumen	single mixed relay
Junior World Championships
Gold medal – first place	2016 Cheile Grădiştei	3 × 6 km relay
Gold medal – first place	2017 Osrblie	3 × 6 km relay
Silver medal – second place	2017 Osrblie	7.5 km sprint
Bronze medal – third place	2017 Osrblie	10 km pursuit
Youth World Championships
Gold medal – first place	2015 Raubichi	7.5 km pursuit
Silver medal – second place	2015 Raubichi	10 km individual
Bronze medal – third place	2015 Raubichi	6 km sprint
Bronze medal – third place	2015 Raubichi	3 × 6 km relay
- Updated on 22 March 2026

Ingrid Landmark Tandrevold (born 23 September 1996) is a Norwegian biathlete who competed for Norway at the 2018 Winter Olympics. She represents the club Fossum IF.

== Biathlon results ==
All results are sourced from the International Biathlon Union.

=== Olympic Games ===
0 medal

Event	Individual	Sprint	Pursuit	Mass start	Relay	Mixed relay
(South Korea) 2018 Pyeongchang	43rd	59th	42nd	—	4th	—
(China) 2022 Beijing	8th	5th	14th	—	—	—
(Italy) 2026 Milano Cortina	71st	10th	46th	—	—	—

=== World Championships ===
11 medals (4 gold, 5 silver, 2 bronze)

Event	Individual	Sprint	Pursuit	Mass start	Relay	Mixed relay	Single mixed relay
(Sweden) 2019 Östersund	18th	Silver	8th	11th	Gold	—	—
(Italy) 2020 Antholz-Antervselva	16th	57th	14th	16th	Gold	—	—
(Slovenia) 2021 Pokljuka	Bronze	21st	10th	Silver	Gold	—	—
(Germany) 2023 Oberhof	11th	14th	4th	Silver	6th	Gold	—
(Czech Republic) 2024 Nové Město na Moravě	27th	25th	34th	10th	10th	Silver	Bronze
(Switzerland) 2025 Lenzerheide	39th	23rd	18th	20th	Silver	4th	—

*During Olympic seasons competitions are only held for those events not included in the Olympic program.

=== Junior World Championships ===
4 medals (2 gold, 1 silver, 1 bronze)

Event	Individual	Sprint	Pursuit	Mass start	Relay	Mixed relay
(Romania) 2016 Cheile Grădiştei	6th	9th	5th	—	Gold	—
(Slovakia) 2017 Osrblie	10th	Silver	Bronze	—	Gold	—

=== World Cup ===
Season	Age	Overall		Individual		Sprint		Pursuit		Mass start	
Season	Age	Points	Position	Points	Position	Points	Position	Points	Position	Points	Position
2015–16	20	16	85th	0	—	12	80th	4	80th	0	—
2017–18	21	163	40th	21	35th	77	37th	65	36th	0	—
2018–19	22	557	11th	76	8th	186	11th	149	19th	154	6th
2019–20	23	554	7th	77	11th	172	11th	185	3rd	127	13th
2020–21	24	707	8th	61	11th	236	10th	181	12th	186	1st
2021–22	25	470	15th	55	7th	142	12th	153	15th	120	5th
2022–23	26	731	6th	147	4th	212	19th	262	6th	110	12th
2023–24	27	1044	3rd	155	2nd	418	1st	318	5th	153	7th
2024–25	28	292	27th	48	22nd	143	15th	77	29th	24	41st
2025–26	29	308	22nd	41	26th	94	25th	107	22nd	66	22nd

==== Individual podiums ====
- 5 victories – (3 Sp, 1 MS, 1 Ind)
- 24 podiums

No.	Season	Date	Location	Discipline	Level	Place
1	2018/19	20 January 2019	Ruhpolding, Germany	12.5 km Mass Start	World Cup	2nd
2	2018/19	8 March 2019	Östersund, Sweden	7.5 km Sprint	World Championship	2nd
3	2019/20	13 December 2019	Hochfilzen, Austria	7.5 km Sprint	World Cup	2nd
4	2019/20	15 December 2019	Hochfilzen, Austria	10 km Pursuit	World Cup	3rd
5	2019/20	21 December 2019	Annecy-Le Grand-Bornand, France	10 km Pursuit	World Cup	2nd
6	2020/21	18 December 2020	Hochfilzen, Austria	7.5 km Sprint	World Cup	2nd
7	2020/21	16 February 2021	Pokljuka, Slovenia	15 km Individual	World Championship	3rd
8	2020/21	21 February 2021	Pokljuka, Slovenia	12.5 km Mass Start	World Championship	2nd
9	2020/21	19 March 2021	Östersund, Sweden	7.5 km Sprint	World Cup	3rd
10	2020/21	21 March 2021	Östersund, Sweden	12.5 km Mass Start	World Cup	1st
11	2022/23	30 November 2022	Kontiolahti, Finland	15 km Individual	World Cup	2nd
12	2022/23	10 December 2022	Hochfilzen, Austria	10 km Pursuit	World Cup	2nd
13	2022/23	19 February 2023	Oberhof, Germany	12.5 km Mass Start	World Championship	2nd
14	2022/23	3 March 2023	Nové Město na Moravě, Czech Republic	7.5 km Sprint	World Cup	2nd
15	2022/23	4 March 2023	Nové Město na Moravě, Czech Republic	10 km Pursuit	World Cup	2nd
16	2023/24	8 December 2023	Hochfilzen, Austria	7.5 km Sprint	World Cup	1st
17	2023/24	9 December 2023	Hochfilzen, Austria	10 km Pursuit	World Cup	3rd
18	2023/24	14 December 2023	Lenzerheide, Switzerland	7.5 km Sprint	World Cup	2nd
19	2023/24	6 January 2024	Oberhof, Germany	10 km Pursuit	World Cup	3rd
20	2023/24	12 January 2024	Ruhpolding, Germany	7.5 km Sprint	World Cup	1st
21	2023/24	14 January 2024	Ruhpolding, Germany	10 km Pursuit	World Cup	2nd
22	2023/24	1 March 2024	Oslo, Norway	15 km Individual	World Cup	1st
23	2023/24	8 March 2024	(United States) Utah, USA	7.5 km Sprint	World Cup	2nd
24	2024/25	7 March 2025	Nové Město na Moravě, Czech Republic	7.5 km Sprint	World Cup	1st
