= Anaïs Chevalier-Bouchet =

French biathlete (born 1993)

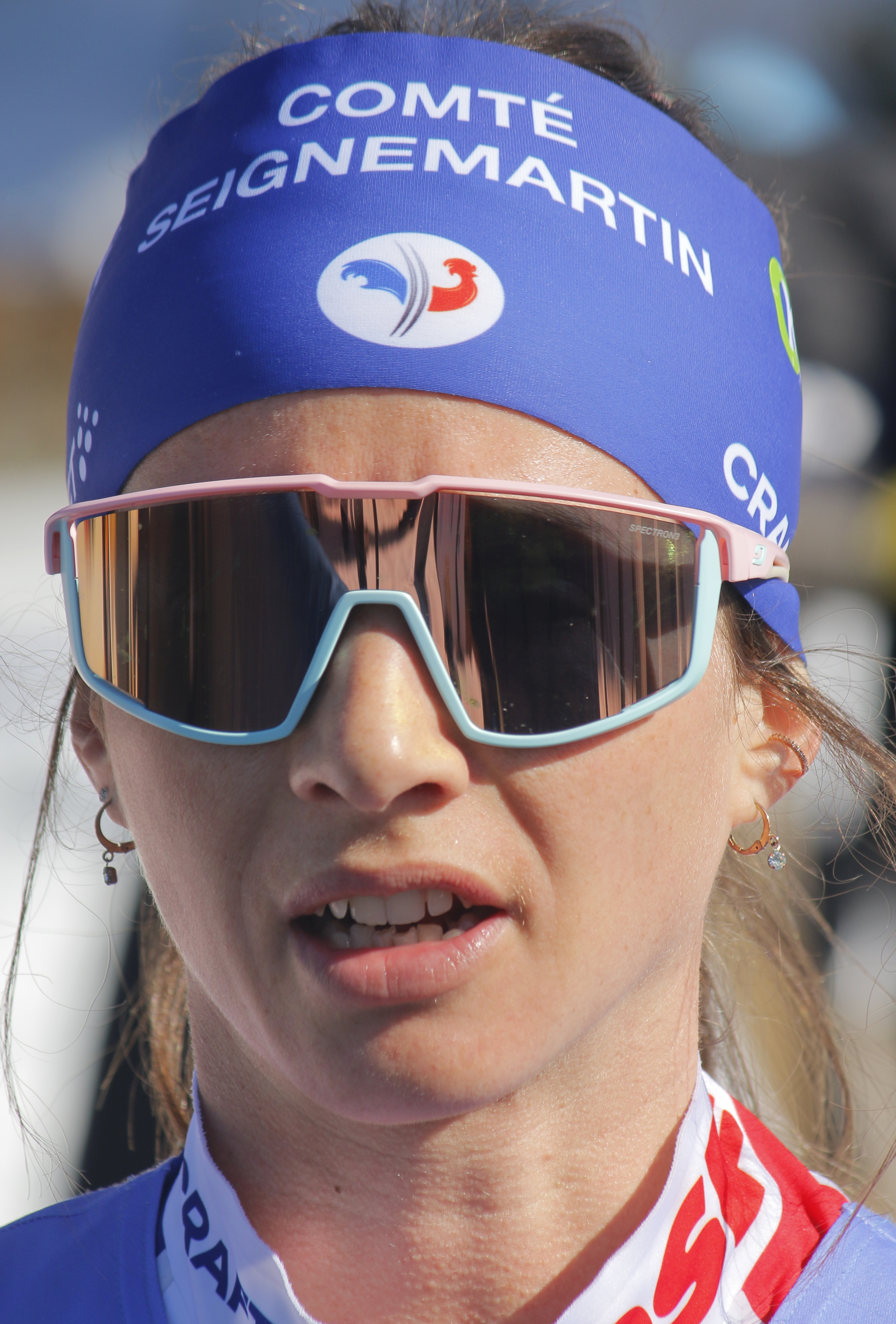
- Chevalier in 2023

Personal information
- Nationality: French
- Born: 12 February 1993 (age 33) Saint-Martin-d'Hères, France
- Height: 1.63 m (5 ft 4 in)
- Weight: 55 kg (121 lb)

Sport

Professional information
- Sport: Biathlon
- Club: Les 7 Laux
- World Cup debut: 2013

Olympic Games
- Teams: 3 (2014, 2018, 2022)
- Medals: 3 (0 gold)

World Championships
- Teams: 5 (2016–2019, 2021, 2023)
- Medals: 7 (0 gold)

World Cup
- Seasons: 10 (2012/13–2018/19; 2020/21-2022/23)
- Individual victories: 1
- All victories: 13
Medal record
Women's biathlon
Representing France
Event	1st	2nd	3rd
Olympic Games	0	2	1
World Championships	0	3	4
Total	0	5	5
Olympic Games
Silver medal – second place	2022 Beijing	15 km Individual
Silver medal – second place	2022 Beijing	Mixed relay
Bronze medal – third place	2018 Pyeongchang	4 × 6 km relay
World Championships
Silver medal – second place	2016 Oslo	4 × 6 km relay
Silver medal – second place	2017 Hochfilzen	Mixed relay
Silver medal – second place	2021 Pokljuka	7.5 km sprint
Bronze medal – third place	2017 Hochfilzen	7.5 km sprint
Bronze medal – third place	2017 Hochfilzen	4 x 6 km relay
Bronze medal – third place	2021 Pokljuka	10 km pursuit
Bronze medal – third place	2023 Oberhof	Mixed relay
Junior World Championships
Silver medal – second place	2012 Kontiolahti	7.5 km pursuit
Youth World Championships
Silver medal – second place	2011 Nové Město	6 km sprint
Silver medal – second place	2011 Nové Město	7.5 km pursuit
Bronze medal – third place	2011 Nové Město	3 × 6 km relay
European Championships
Bronze medal – third place	2015 Otepää	4 x 6 km relay

Anaïs Chevalier-Bouchet (born 12 February 1993) is a retired French biathlete. She competed at the 2014 Winter Olympics in Sochi, 2018 Winter Olympics and 2022 Winter Olympics. She retired at the end of the 2022/23 season. Her sister Chloé Chevalier is also a retired biathlete.

== Career ==
=== Olympic Games ===
3 medals (2 silver, 1 bronze)

Event	Individual	Sprint	Pursuit	Mass start	Relay	Mixed relay
(Russia) 2014 Sochi	—	47th	44th	—	DNF	—
(South Korea) 2018 Pyeongchang	28th	16th	24th	29th	Bronze	—
(China) 2022 Beijing	Silver	68th	—	19th	6th	Silver

=== World Championships ===
7 medals (3 silver, 4 bronze)

Event	Individual	Sprint	Pursuit	Mass start	Relay	Mixed relay	Single mixed relay
(Norway) 2016 Oslo Holmenkollen	28th	26th	15th	30th	Silver	—	—N/a
(Austria) 2017 Hochfilzen	38th	Bronze	11th	13th	Bronze	Silver	—N/a
(Sweden) 2019 Östersund	49th	32nd	DNS	—	8th	8th	—
(Slovenia) 2021 Pokljuka	27th	Silver	Bronze	27th	8th	5th	—
(Germany) 2023 Oberhof	12th	24th	23rd	4th	4th	Bronze	—

*The single mixed relay was added as an event in 2019.

=== World Cup ===
World Cup rankings

Season	Overall		Individual		Sprint		Pursuit		Mass start	
Season	Points	Position	Points	Position	Points	Position	Points	Position	Points	Position
2013–14	-	48th	-	56th	-	47th	-	44th	-	-
2014–15	(shortened season due to back injury)									
2015–16	-	40th	-	47th	-	46th	-	30th	-	53rd
2016–17	-	7th	-	14th	-	7th	-	8th	-	13th
2017–18	-	19th	-	26th	-	36th	-	25th	-	5th
2018–19	-	20th	-	26th	-	9th	-	22nd	-	28th
2019–20	(did not compete due to pregnancy)									
2020–21	-	9th	-	7th	-	5th	-	11th	-	27th
2021–22	-	5th	-	-	-	5th	-	4th	-	9th
2022–23	-	8th	-	16th	-	11th	-	8th	-	2nd

Individual victory

1 victory

No.	Season	Date	Location	Discipline	Level
1	2016–17	17 December 2016	(Czech Republic) Nové Město	10 km Pursuit	Biathlon World Cup

Relay victories

12 victories

No.	Season	Date	Location	Discipline	Level	Team
1	2014–15	30 November 2014	(Sweden) Östersund	Mixed Relay	Biathlon World Cup	Bescond / Chevalier / S.Fourcade / Fourcade
2	2015–16	24 January 2016	(Italy) Antholz-Anterselva	Relay	Biathlon World Cup	Braisaz / Bescond / Chevalier / Dorin Habert
3	2017–18	7 January 2018	(Germany) Oberhof	Relay	Biathlon World Cup	Bescond / Chevalier / Aymonier / Braisaz
4	2017–18	10 March 2018	(Finland) Kontiolahti	Single Mixed Relay	Biathlon World Cup	Chevalier / Guigonnat
5	2017–18	17 March 2018	(Norway) Oslo Holmenkollen	Relay	Biathlon World Cup	Chevalier / Aymonier / Dorin Habert / Bescond
6	2018–19	19 January 2019	(Germany) Ruhpolding	Relay	Biathlon World Cup	Simon / Bescond / Braisaz / Chevalier
7	2018–19	17 February 2019	(United States) Salt Lake City	Mixed Relay	Biathlon World Cup	Fillon Maillet / Desthieux / Aymonier / Chevalier
8	2021–22	5 December 2021	(Sweden) Östersund	Relay	Biathlon World Cup	Bescond / Chevalier / Simon / Braisaz
9	2021–22	14 January 2022	(Germany) Ruhpolding	Relay	Biathlon World Cup	Chevalier / C.Chevalier / Braisaz / Simon
10	2022–23	11 December 2022	(Austria) Hochfilzen	Relay	Biathlon World Cup	Jeanmonnot / Chevalier / C.Chevalier / Simon
11	2022–23	8 January 2023	(Slovenia) Pokljuka	Mixed Relay	Biathlon World Cup	Claude / Fillon Maillet / Chevalier / Simon
12	2022–23	22 January 2023	(Italy) Antholz-Anterselva	Relay	Biathlon World Cup	Jeanmonnot / Chevalier / C.Chevalier / Simon

== Personal life ==
On 9 September 2017, Chevalier married with the former biathlete Martin Bouchet. On 29 October 2019 they had a baby called Emie.
