= Anna Weidel =

German biathlete (born 2005)

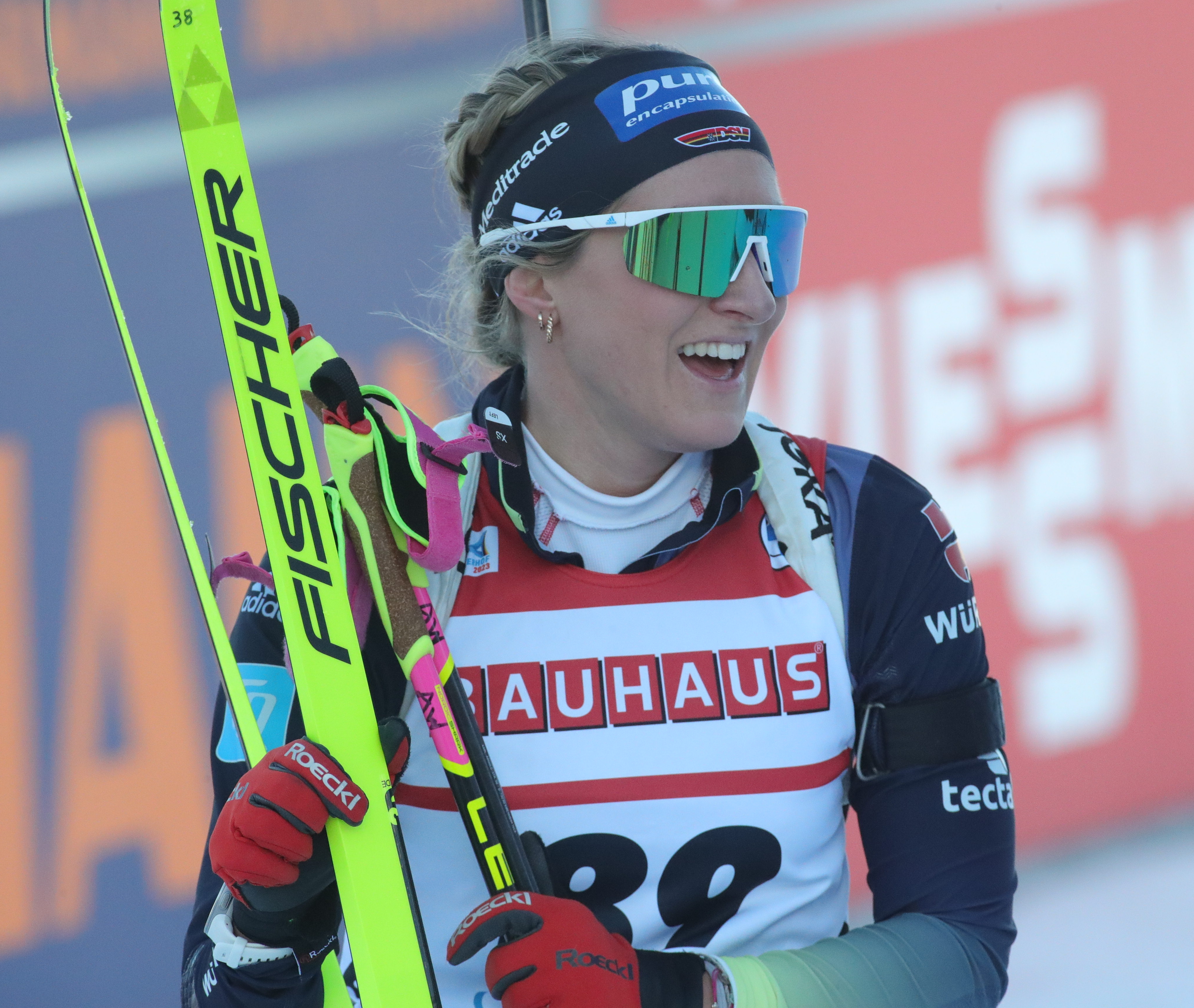
- Weidel in 2023

Personal information
- Nationality: German
- Born: 25 May 1996 (age 30) Kufstein, Austria

Sport
- Country: Germany
- Sport: Biathlon
Medal record
Women's biathlon
Representing Germany
European Championships
Gold medal – first place	2025 Val Martello	4 × 6 km relay
Junior World Championships
Silver medal – second place	2017 Brezno-Osrblie	3 × 6 km relay
Bronze medal – third place	2015 Raubichi	3 × 6 km relay
Bronze medal – third place	2017 Brezno-Osrblie	12.5 km individual
Youth World Championships
Silver medal – second place	2014 Presque Isle	6 km sprint
Silver medal – second place	2014 Presque Isle	7.5 km pursuit
- Updated on 20 December 2024

Anna Weidel (born 25 May 1996) is a German biathlete. She made her debut in the Biathlon World Cup in 2018.

== Career ==
Anna Weidel made her international debut at the 2014 Junior World Championships in Presque Isle, where she won silver medals in both the sprint and pursuit events and finished sixth in the individual race. Due to her performance, she was classified in the C national team squad. At the end of 2014, Weidel debuted in the IBU Cup in Obertilliach during a sprint race, immediately earning points with a 31st-place finish. In her second race in Duszniki-Zdrój, she narrowly missed the top-10, finishing 12th in a sprint. She followed this with a 28th-place finish in another sprint at the same venue. During the World Team Challenge at Arena AufSchalke, Anna Weidel won the junior competition alongside Marco Groß.

At the 2015 Junior World Championships in Minsk-Raubichi, she competed in the junior category for the first time but was unable to match her previous year's results in the individual events, with her best finish being 19th in the individual race. However, in the relay event, she secured a bronze medal with teammates Marie Heinrich and Helene-Therese Hendel, behind France and Russia. That same year, she won the German Team Challenge at Schalke again, this time with Dominic Reiter. In 2016, at the Junior European Championships in Pokljuka, her only top-10 finish was a 10th place in the individual race.

During the 2016–17 IBU Junior Cup, Weidel achieved her first victory by winning the pursuit in Hochfilzen. At the Junior European Championships in Nové Město na Moravě, she claimed the individual title and finished 8th in the pursuit after placing 23rd in the sprint. At the 2017 Junior World Championships in Osrblie, Weidel earned a bronze medal in the individual race behind Megan Bankes and Julia Schwaiger, placed 12th in the sprint, and narrowly missed another medal with a 4th-place finish in the pursuit. She then secured a silver medal in the relay event alongside Vanessa Voigt and Sophia Schneider, finishing behind Norway. Additionally, she won the pursuit and individual standings in the IBU Junior Cup and ranked fifth overall in the series. These performances earned her another appearance in the IBU Cup in Kontiolahti in March, where she impressed with a 4th place in the sprint and her first IBU Cup victory in the pursuit.

After strong performances in the first two sprint races of the 2018–19 IBU Cup, she was nominated for the initial World Cup races of the 2018/19 winter season. In her first World Cup race, the 15 km individual event in Pokljuka, she finished 66th with four shooting misses. However, in the following sprint event, she achieved her first top-10 World Cup finish, placing 10th with flawless shooting. She followed this with an 11th place in the pursuit. Despite these promising results, she could not maintain the same level of performance in subsequent World Cups in Hochfilzen and Oberhof and competed primarily in the IBU Cup for the rest of the season. Highlights included a 10th place at the 2019 Biathlon European Championships in Minsk and a victory in the supersprint in Otepää, alongside other finishes outside the top-10.

On January 19, 2022, the German Olympic Sports Confederation announced that Weidel was nominated for the 2022 Winter Olympics. Earlier, she had achieved partial qualification during the 2021/22 Biathlon World Cup. However, she did not compete at the Olympics.

== Biathlon results ==
All results are sourced from the International Biathlon Union.

=== World Championships ===
Event	Individual	Sprint	Pursuit	Mass start	Relay	Mixed relay
(Germany) 2023 Oberhof	87th	—	—	—	—	—

=== World Cup ===
Season	Overall			Individual		Sprint		Pursuit		Mass start	
Season	Races	Points	Position	Points	Position	Points	Position	Points	Position	Points	Position
2018–19	6/26	69	63rd	—	—	31	60th	38	49th	—	—
2019–20	4/21	Did not earn World Cup points									
2020–21	10/26	35	70th	—	—	10	78th	25	55th	—	—
2021–22	6/22	72	52nd	47	10th	25	61st	—	—	—	—
2022–23	15/20	224	29th	19	46th	92	26th	66	29th	47	28th
2023–24	2/21	Did not earn World Cup points									

=== Youth and Junior World Championships ===
5 medals (3 silver, 2 bronze)

Year	Age	Individual	Sprint	Pursuit	Relay
(United States) 2014 Presque Isle	18	6th	Silver	Silver	—
(Belarus) 2015 Minsk-Raubichi	19	19th	46th	34th	Bronze
(Slovakia) 2017 Brezno-Osrblie	21	Bronze	12th	4th	Silver
