= 2025–26 Biathlon World Cup – Stage 1 =

2025–26 Biathlon World Cup Stage

The 2025–26 Biathlon World Cup – Stage 1 was the first event of the season and is being held in Östersund, Sweden, from 29 November to 7 December 2025.

== Stage overview ==
Following the previous season, several athletes announced their retirement, most notably the Overall World Cup and Olympic champions Johannes Thingnes Bø and Tarjei Bø, as well as the established World Cup competitors Elisa Gasparin, Chloé Chevalier, Emma Lunder and Felix Leitner. Janina Hettich-Walz, nominated by the German federation, will contest her first World Cup races since her pregnancy. Linn Gestblom will compete at the highest level for the first time after a 650-day injury break. Julia Simon was suspended due to a court ruling issued beforehand concerning the 2022 credit card fraud incident and was consequently excluded from the opening World Cup week.

As in every year, so-called season openings took place in Sweden and Norway in 2025. The competitions in Sweden were held in Idre as in previous years, but due to a lack of snow, the planned Short Individual race was abandoned, and two sprints over a shortened course were held instead. The first sprint was won by Sebastian Samuelsson and Hanna Öberg. Linn Gestblom achieved third place in her first official competition in over a year and a half – and both of them remained error-free at the shooting range. In the second sprint, Lucas Fratzscher led a German triple victory for the men, while Elvira Öberg won in the women's field. The races in Norway, also due to weather conditions, were held in Geilo instead of the usual venue, Sjusjøen. Maren Kirkeeide, by a narrow margin ahead of Marit Øygard and Lotte Lie and Johan-Olav Botn won the sprints, while Ingrid Landmark Tandrevold and Éric Perrot finished first in the mass start. The B-mass start, held before the actual competition, was won by the Norwegians Martin Nevland and Elida Fuglem.

Both nations subsequently also determined their athlete nominations for the first World Cup weekend. The Norwegian federation decided, in addition to the already qualified athletes, on Marthe Kråkstad Johansen, Ragnhild Femsteinevik, and Marit Øygard for the women's team, and Johan-Olav Botn, Vetle Sjåstad Christiansen, Isak Frey, and Vebjørn Sørum for the men's team. In Sweden, alongside established athletes, a debutant, Melker Nordgren, was also nominated. The German men's team also participated in the qualification races in Idre; ultimately, Lucas Fratzscher, Philipp Horn, Simon Kaiser, and Danilo Riethmüller qualified based on the results. The members of the women's team were selected at qualifying competitions in Ruhpolding in addition to the already mentioned Janina Hettich-Walz, Marlene Fichtner and Anna Weidel were given the remaining spots. Before the start of the stage, it was announced that the previously listed Vebjørn Sørum would be replaced by reserve athlete Sivert Guttorm Bakken due to poor health.

Johan-Olav Botn and Suvi Minkkinen secured their first career victories in the individual race. Sonja Leinamo and Camille Bened also earned their first individual podiums. After all the races of the stage, Johan-Olav Botn leads the overall World Cup standings for men, and Suvi Minkkinen leads for women.

== Schedule of events ==
The events took place at the following times.

Date	Time	Events
29 November	15:15 CET	Women's 4x6 km Relay
29 November	18:55 CET	Men's 4x7.5 km Relay
30 November	16:00 CET	Single Mixed Relay
30 November	18:40 CET	Mixed Relay
2 December	17:30 CET	Women's 15 km Individual
3 December	17:30 CET	Men's 20 km Individual
5 December	18:00 CET	Women's 7.5 km Sprint
6 December	18:30 CET	Men's 10 km Sprint
7 December	15:15 CET	Women's 10 km Pursuit
7 December	17:20 CET	Men's 12.5 km Pursuit

== Medal winners ==
=== Men ===
Event:	Gold:	Time	Silver:	Time	Bronze:	Time
4 x 7.5 km Relay	Norway; Martin Uldal; Isak Frey; Sturla Holm Lægreid; Vetle Sjåstad Christiansen	1:11:10.1 (0+2) (0+2) (0+0) (0+0) (0+1) (0+2) (1+3) (0+0)	France; Fabien Claude; Quentin Fillon Maillet; Émilien Jacquelin; Éric Perrot	1:11:25.4 (0+2) (2+3) (0+0) (0+1) (0+0) (1+3) (0+2) (0+0)	Sweden; Viktor Brandt; Jesper Nelin; Sebastian Samuelsson; Martin Ponsiluoma	1:11:34.8 (0+3) (3+3) (0+2) (0+0) (0+2) (0+3) (0+0) (0+1)
20 km Individual	Johan-Olav Botn; Norway	46:49.4 (0+0+0+0)	Martin Uldal; Norway	47:47.1 (0+0+0+0)	Sebastian Samuelsson; Sweden	47:49.4 (0+0+1+0)
10 km Sprint	Johan-Olav Botn; Norway	24:26.3 (0+0)	Martin Uldal; Norway	24:37.4 (0+0)	Quentin Fillon Maillet; France	24:40.6 (0+0)
12.5 km Pursuit	Quentin Fillon Maillet; France	30:14.5 (1+1+0+0)	Sebastian Samuelsson; Sweden	+6.7 (0+0+1+1)	Johan-Olav Botn; Norway	+10.3 (0+1+0+1)

=== Women ===
Event:	Gold:	Time	Silver:	Time	Bronze:	Time
4 x 6 km Relay	France; Jeanne Richard; Océane Michelon; Justine Braisaz-Bouchet; Lou Jeanmonnot	1:11:17.9 (0+0) (0+2) (0+1) (0+3) (0+0) (0+0) (0+0) (0+2)	Italy; Dorothea Wierer; Michela Carrara; Lisa Vittozzi; Hannah Auchentaller	1:11:31.7 (0+1) (0+0) (1+3) (1+2) (0+0) (0+1) (0+2) (0+0)	Czech Republic; Jessica Jislová; Lucie Charvátová; Tereza Voborníková; Markéta Davidová	1:11:48.7 (0+0) (0+0) (0+1) (0+3) (0+2) (0+0) (0+0) (0+2)
15 km Individual	Dorothea Wierer; Italy	43:08.0 (1+1+0+0)	Sonja Leinamo; Finland	43:08.3 (0+0+1+0)	Camille Bened; France	43:16.4 (0+0+0+1)
7.5 km Sprint	Suvi Minkkinen; Finland	20:11.9 (0+0)	Anna Magnusson; Sweden	20:28.5 (0+0)	Océane Michelon; France	20:32.7 (0+0)
10 km Pursuit	Lisa Theresa Hauser; Austria	30:14.2 (0+0+0+0)	Suvi Minkkinen; Finland	+2.5 (0+0+0+1)	Anna Magnusson; Sweden	+31.8 (1+0+0+0)

=== Mixed ===
Event:	Gold:	Time	Silver:	Time	Bronze:	Time
Single Mixed Relay	Sweden; Sebastian Samuelsson; Ella Halvarsson; Sebastian Samuelsson; Ella Halvarsson	35:12.1 (0+0) (0+0) (0+0) (0+1) (0+0) (0+0) (0+1) (0+2)	Norway; Sturla Holm Lægreid; Maren Kirkeeide; Sturla Holm Lægreid; Maren Kirkeeide	35:31.2 (0+0) (0+1) (0+1) (0+0) (0+0) (0+1) (0+2) (0+1)	France; Fabien Claude; Camille Bened; Fabien Claude; Camille Bened	35:49.4 (0+0) (0+0) (0+0) (0+1) (0+0) (1+3) (0+1) (0+1)
Mixed Relay	France; Émilien Jacquelin; Éric Perrot; Justine Braisaz-Bouchet; Lou Jeanmonnot	1:05:16.5 (0+0) (0+3) (0+1) (0+1) (0+1) (0+0) (0+0) (0+0)	Italy; Tommaso Giacomel; Lukas Hofer; Dorothea Wierer; Lisa Vittozzi	1:05:41.7 (0+1) (0+3) (0+0) (0+0) (0+0) (0+3) (0+0) (0+1)	Norway; Endre Strømsheim; Johan-Olav Botn; Karoline Offigstad Knotten; Ingrid Landmark Tandrevold	1:06:21.8 (0+0) (0+2) (0+0) (0+0) (0+0) (0+1) (0+1) (1+3)

== Achievements ==
Best individual performance for all time

Men

- (Norway) Johan-Olav Botn (26), reached No. 1 on individual race
- (Sweden) Malte Stefansson (25), reached No. 10 on sprint race
- (United States) Maxime Germain (24), reached No. 11 on sprint race
- (Estonia) Jakob Kulbin (20), reached No. 12 on individual race
- (Poland) Jan Guńka (23), reached No. 17 on pursuit race
- (Lithuania) Maksim Fomin (25), reached No. 20 on individual race
- (Estonia) Mark-Markos Kehva (21), reached No. 34 on individual race
- (Ukraine) Bohdan Borkovskyi (21), reached No. 43 on sprint race
- (Sweden) Melker Nordgren (23), reached No. 51 on pursuit race
- (Greenland) Sondre Slettemark (21), reached No. 56 on individual race
- (Slovakia) Simon Adamov (21), reached No. 60 on individual race
- (Canada) Jasper Fleming (20), reached No. 72 on individual race
- (Belgium) Julien Petitjacques (22), reached No. 81 on sprint race
- (Finland) Kalle Loukkaanhuhta (22), reached No. 82 on sprint race
- (Slovenia) Matic Bradeško (22), reached No. 84 on individual race
- (Finland) Turkka Nieminen (22), reached No. 101 on individual race

Women

- (Finland) Suvi Minkkinen (30), reached No. 1 on sprint race
- (Finland) Sonja Leinamo (23), reached No. 2 on individual race
- (France) Camille Bened (25), reached No. 3 on individual race
- (Belgium) Maya Cloetens (23), reached No. 6 on individual race
- (Poland) Joanna Jakieła (26), reached No. 6 on sprint race
- (Finland) Inka Hämäläinen (19), reached No. 12 on sprint race
- (Slovenia) Lena Repinc (22), reached No. 16 on individual race
- (Latvia) Estere Volfa (20), reached No. 23 on pursuit race
- (Norway) Marit Øygard (26), reached No. 26 on sprint race
- (Canada) Shilo Rousseau (25), reached No. 31 on sprint race
- (France) Amandine Mengin (21), reached No. 38 on individual race
- (Germany) Marlene Fichtner (22), reached No. 44 on pursuit race
- (Ukraine) Daryna Chalyk (24), reached No. 46 on sprint race
- (Poland) Anna Nędza-Kubiniec (22), reached No. 54 on pursuit race
- (Latvia) Elza Bleidele (20), reached No. 60 on individual race
- (United Kingdom) Shawna Pendry (23), reached No. 67 on sprint race
- (Ukraine) Valeriia Dmytrenko (28), reached No. 72 on individual race
- (Belgium) Marisa Emonts (20), reached No. 100 on sprint race

First World Cup individual race

Men

- (Ukraine) Bohdan Borkovskyi (21), reached No. 44 on individual race
- (Slovenia) Matic Bradeško (22), reached No. 84 on individual race
- (Finland) Kalle Loukkaanhuhta (22), reached No. 87 on individual race
- (Sweden) Melker Nordgren (23), reached No. 89 on individual race
- (Belgium) Julien Petitjacques (22), reached No. 100 on individual race
- (Finland) Turkka Nieminen (22), reached No. 101 on individual race

Women

- (Ukraine) Valeriia Dmytrenko (28), reached No. 72 on individual race
- (Belgium) Marisa Emonts (20), reached No. 100 on sprint race
