= 2023–24 Biathlon IBU Cup =

2023–2024 season of the Biathlon IBU Cup

Discipline	Men	Women
Overall	(Norway) Mats Øverby	(France) Océane Michelon
U25	(Norway) Mats Øverby	(France) Océane Michelon
Individual	(Norway) Mats Øverby	(Norway) Maren Kirkeeide
Sprint	(Norway) Johan-Olav Botn	(France) Océane Michelon
Pursuit	(Norway) Mats Øverby	(France) Océane Michelon
Mass start	(Norway) Martin Nevland	(France) Anaëlle Bondoux
Nations Cup	Norway	Norway
- Mixed: Norway

Competition
Edition	16th	16th
Locations	8	8
Individual	23	23
Mixed	8	8

The 2023–24 Biathlon IBU Cup was a multi-race series over a season of biathlon, organised by the International Biathlon Union (IBU). It was the 16th edition for men and women of the second-rank international race series in biathlon after the Biathlon World Cup.

The season started on 30 November 2023 in Kontiolahti, Finland and concluded on 9 March 2024 in Obertilliach, Austria.

The highlight of the season was the 2024 IBU Open European Championships in Brezno-Osrblie, Slovakia. These competitions were also included in the rankings of the IBU Cup.

Endre Strømsheim from Norway (men's) and Tilda Johansson from Sweden (women's) were the reigning champion from the previous season, but they didn't defend the title.

Mats Øverby from Norway and Océane Michelon from France became the new overall champions.

== Map of IBU Cup hosts ==
All 8 locations hosting IBU Cup events in this season (including Brezno-Osrblie – venue of the European Championships).

(Finland) Kontiolahti	(Sweden) Idre Fjäll	(Norway) Sjusjøen	(Italy) Martell-Val Martello
Europe
(Italy) Ridnaun-Val Ridanna	(Slovakia) Brezno-Osrblie	(Germany) Arber	(Austria) Obertilliach

European Championships

== Calendar ==
Stage	Location	Date	Individual / Short individual	Sprint	Pursuit	Mass start	Mixed relay	Single mixed relay	Details
1	(Finland) Kontiolahti	30 November–3 December	●	●			●	●	
2	(Sweden) Idre Fjäll	8–10 December		●●	●				
3	(Norway) Sjusjøen	13–16 December		●	●	●			
4	(Italy) Martell-Val Martello	4–7 January	●	●	●				
5	(Italy) Ridnaun-Val Ridanna	10–13 January		●		●	●	●	
ECH	(Slovakia) Brezno-Osrblie	24–28 January	●	●	●		●	●	European Championships
6	(Germany) Arber	1–3 February		●●					
7	(Austria) Obertilliach	29 February–3 March		●	●		●	●	
8	(Austria) Obertilliach	7–9 March	●	●		●			
Total: 70 (31 men's, 31 women's, 8 mixed)			4	11	5	3	4	4	

== Men ==
=== Calendar ===
Key: IND – Individual / SIND – Short Individual / SPR – Sprint / PUR – Pursuit / MSS – Mass Start
#	Date	Place (In brackets Stage)	Discipline	Winner	Second	Third	R.
1	30 November 2023	(Finland) Kontiolahti (1)	20 km IND	(Norway) Johan-Olav Botn	(Norway) Mats Øverby	(Norway) Martin Nevland	
2	2 December 2023	(Finland) Kontiolahti (1)	10 km SPR	(Norway) Johan-Olav Botn	(Germany) Philipp Horn	(Norway) Mats Øverby	
3	8 December 2023	(Sweden) Idre Fjäll (2)	10 km SPR	(Norway) Johan-Olav Botn	(Norway) Martin Nevland	(Norway) Martin Uldal	
4	9 December 2023	(Sweden) Idre Fjäll (2)	10 km SPR	(Germany) Philipp Horn	(Norway) Johan-Olav Botn	(France) Oscar Lombardot	
5	10 December 2023	(Sweden) Idre Fjäll (2)	12.5 km PUR	(Norway) Johan-Olav Botn	(Germany) Philipp Horn	(Norway) Martin Uldal	
6	13 December 2023	(Norway) Sjusjøen (3)	10 km SPR	(Germany) Simon Kaiser	(Norway) Johan-Olav Botn	(Norway) Mats Øverby	
7	15 December 2023	(Norway) Sjusjøen (3)	12.5 km PUR	(Norway) Johan-Olav Botn	(Norway) Martin Uldal	(Norway) Martin Nevland	
8	16 December 2023	(Norway) Sjusjøen (3)	15 km MSS	(Norway) Martin Nevland	(Norway) Mats Øverby	(Norway) Johan-Olav Botn	
9	4 January 2024	(Italy) Martell-Val Martello (4)	15 km SIND	(Norway) Vebjørn Sørum	(Norway) Mats Øverby	(Norway) Isak Frey	
10	6 January 2024	(Italy) Martell-Val Martello (4)	10 km SPR	(Norway) Isak Frey	(Norway) Mats Øverby	(Germany) Danilo Riethmüller	
11	7 January 2024	(Italy) Martell-Val Martello (4)	12.5 km PUR	(Norway) Isak Frey	(Norway) Vebjørn Sørum	(Germany) Danilo Riethmüller	
12	10 January 2024	(Italy) Ridnaun-Val Ridanna (5)	10 km SPR	(Norway) Johan-Olav Botn	(Norway) Mats Øverby	(Germany) Danilo Riethmüller	
13	12 January 2024	(Italy) Ridnaun-Val Ridanna (5)	15 km MSS	(Germany) Danilo Riethmüller	(Norway) Martin Nevland	(France) Antonin Guigonnat	
IBU Open European Championships 2024 (24–28 January)
14	24 January 2024	(Slovakia) Brezno-Osrblie	20 km IND	(Norway) Vebjørn Sørum	(Norway) Johan-Olav Botn	(Norway) Martin Uldal	
15	26 January 2024	(Slovakia) Brezno-Osrblie	10 km SPR	(France) Antonin Guigonnat	(Norway) Johan-Olav Botn	(Norway) Isak Frey	
16	27 January 2024	(Slovakia) Brezno-Osrblie	12.5 km PUR	(Norway) Isak Frey	(Romania) Dmitrii Shamaev	(France) Antonin Guigonnat	
17	1 February 2024	(Germany) Arber (6)	10 km SPR	(Norway) Martin Uldal	(Norway) Johan-Olav Botn	(Norway) Isak Frey	
18	3 February 2024	(Germany) Arber (6)	10 km SPR	(Norway) Johan-Olav Botn	(Norway) Martin Uldal	(Germany) Simon Kaiser	
19	29 February 2024	(Austria) Obertilliach (7), (8)	10 km SPR	(Norway) Mats Øverby	(Norway) Sindre Fjellheim Jorde	(Norway) Sverre Dahlen Aspenes	
20	2 March 2024	(Austria) Obertilliach (7), (8)	12.5 km PUR	(Norway) Mats Øverby	(Norway) Martin Nevland	(Norway) Sindre Fjellheim Jorde	
21	7 March 2024	(Austria) Obertilliach (7), (8)	15 km SIND	(Norway) Mats Øverby	(Norway) Isak Frey	(Norway) Martin Uldal	
22	8 March 2024	(Austria) Obertilliach (7), (8)	10 km SPR	(Norway) Martin Uldal	(Norway) Isak Frey	(Norway) Sverre Dahlen Aspenes	
23	9 March 2024	(Austria) Obertilliach (7), (8)	15 km MSS	(Norway) Sverre Dahlen Aspenes	(Norway) Martin Uldal	(Norway) Martin Nevland	
16th IBU Cup Overall (30 November 2023 – 9 March 2024)				(Norway) Mats Øverby	(Norway) Johan-Olav Botn	(Norway) Martin Nevland	

=== Overall leaders ===
No.	Holder	Date gained	Place	Date forfeited	Place	Number of competitions
1.	(Norway) Johan-Olav Botn	30 November 2023	(Finland) Kontiolahti	7 March 2024	(Austria) Obertilliach	20
2.	(Norway) Mats Øverby	7 March 2024	(Austria) Obertilliach	Overall Winner		3

=== Standings ===
==== Overall ====
Rank	after all 23 events	Points
	(Norway) Mats Øverby	1325
2	(Norway) Johan-Olav Botn	1135
3	(Norway) Martin Nevland	1037
4	(Norway) Martin Uldal	980
5	(Norway) Isak Frey	917
6	(Germany) Danilo Riethmüller	710
7	(Germany) Lucas Fratzscher	655
8	(Germany) Simon Kaiser	621
9	(Norway) Vebjørn Sørum	538
10	(Italy) Daniele Cappellari	436

==== Under 25 ====
Rank	after all 23 events	Points
	(Norway) Mats Øverby	1325
2	(Norway) Johan-Olav Botn	1135
3	(Norway) Martin Nevland	1037
4	(Norway) Martin Uldal	980
5	(Norway) Isak Frey	917
6	(Germany) Danilo Riethmüller	710
7	(Germany) Simon Kaiser	621
8	(France) Damien Levet	426
9	(Norway) Vetle Paulsen	372
10	(France) Émilien Claude	364

==== Individual ====
Rank	after all 4 events	Points
	(Norway) Mats Øverby	276
2	(Norway) Vebjørn Sørum	180
3	(Norway) Isak Frey	180
4	(Norway) Johan-Olav Botn	165
5	(Norway) Martin Uldal	147

==== Sprint ====
Rank	after all 11 events	Points
	(Norway) Johan-Olav Botn	660
2	(Norway) Mats Øverby	603
3	(Norway) Martin Uldal	492
4	(Norway) Martin Nevland	421
5	(Norway) Isak Frey	404

==== Pursuit ====
Rank	after all 5 events	Points
	(Norway) Mats Øverby	271
2	(Norway) Martin Nevland	254
3	(Norway) Isak Frey	220
4	(Norway) Johan-Olav Botn	210
5	(Norway) Martin Uldal	184

==== Mass start ====
Rank	after all 3 events	Points
	(Norway) Martin Nevland	225
2	(Norway) Mats Øverby	175
3	(Norway) Martin Uldal	157
4	(Germany) Danilo Riethmüller	116
5	(Norway) Isak Frey	113

==== Nations Cup ====
Rank	after all 23 events	Points
1	Norway	8493
2	Germany	7332
3	France	7093
4	Sweden	6690
5	Italy	6530

== Women ==
=== Calendar ===
Key: IND – Individual / SIND – Short Individual / SPR – Sprint / PUR – Pursuit / MSS – Mass Start
#	Date	Place (In brackets Stage)	Discipline	Winner	Second	Third	R.
1	30 November 2023	(Finland) Kontiolahti (1)	15 km IND	(France) Jeanne Richard	(Norway) Maren Kirkeeide	(Norway) Karoline Erdal	
2	2 December 2023	(Finland) Kontiolahti (1)	7.5 km SPR	(Norway) Emilie Ågheim Kalkenberg	(Sweden) Sara Andersson	(France) Océane Michelon	
3	8 December 2023	(Sweden) Idre Fjäll (2)	7.5 km SPR	(Germany) Johanna Puff	(Norway) Jenny Enodd	(France) Jeanne Richard	
4	9 December 2023	(Sweden) Idre Fjäll (2)	7.5 km SPR	(Norway) Karoline Erdal	(Germany) Juliane Frühwirth	(Sweden) Anna-Karin Heijdenberg	
5	10 December 2023	(Sweden) Idre Fjäll (2)	10 km PUR	(Norway) Jenny Enodd	(Norway) Karoline Erdal	(Sweden) Ella Halvarsson	
6	13 December 2023	(Norway) Sjusjøen (3)	7.5 km SPR	(France) Océane Michelon	(France) Jeanne Richard	(Norway) Gro Randby	
7	15 December 2023	(Norway) Sjusjøen (3)	10 km PUR	(France) Anaëlle Bondoux	(Norway) Ida Lien	(Sweden) Stina Nilsson	
8	16 December 2023	(Norway) Sjusjøen (3)	12.5 km MSS	(Germany) Julia Tannheimer	(Norway) Jenny Enodd	(Norway) Ida Lien	
9	4 January 2024	(Italy) Martell-Val Martello (4)	12.5 km SIND	(Germany) Julia Kink	(Germany) Emily Schumann	(Sweden) Stina Nilsson	
10	6 January 2024	(Italy) Martell-Val Martello (4)	7.5 km SPR	(Norway) Maren Kirkeeide	(Belgium) Maya Cloetens	(Sweden) Stina Nilsson	
11	7 January 2024	(Italy) Martell-Val Martello (4)	10 km PUR	(France) Gilonne Guigonnat	(Austria) Anna Andexer	(Germany) Johanna Puff	
12	10 January 2024	(Italy) Ridnaun-Val Ridanna (5)	7.5 km SPR	(France) Gilonne Guigonnat	(Italy) Sara Scattolo	(Norway) Ida Lien	
13	12 January 2024	(Italy) Ridnaun-Val Ridanna (5)	12.5 km MSS	(Germany) Johanna Puff	(Germany) Selina Grotian	(Norway) Ida Lien	
IBU Open European Championships 2024 (24–28 January)
14	24 January 2024	(Slovakia) Brezno-Osrblie	15 km IND	(Norway) Maren Kirkeeide	(Moldova) Alina Stremous	(Slovakia) Ema Kapustová	
15	26 January 2024	(Slovakia) Brezno-Osrblie	7.5 km SPR	(Norway) Ida Lien	(Norway) Maren Kirkeeide	(Ukraine) Khrystyna Dmytrenko	
16	27 January 2024	(Slovakia) Brezno-Osrblie	10 km PUR	(Norway) Maren Kirkeeide	(Norway) Emilie Ågheim Kalkenberg	(France) Océane Michelon	
17	1 February 2024	(Germany) Arber (6)	7.5 km SPR	(Italy) Hannah Auchentaller	(Norway) Emilie Ågheim Kalkenberg	(Italy) Sara Scatollo	
18	3 February 2024	(Germany) Arber (6)	7.5 km SPR	(Norway) Karoline Erdal	(France) Camille Bened	(Austria) Lea Rothschopf	
19	29 February 2024	(Austria) Obertilliach (7), (8)	7.5 km SPR	(Norway) Ragnhild Femsteinevik	(France) Océane Michelon	(Austria) Kristina Oberthaler	
20	2 March 2024	(Austria) Obertilliach (7), (8)	10 km PUR	(Norway) Marthe Kråkstad Johansen	(France) Océane Michelon	(Czech Republic) Tereza Vinklárková	
21	7 March 2024	(Austria) Obertilliach (7), (8)	12.5 km SIND	(Germany) Lisa Maria Spark	(France) Chloé Chevalier	(France) Camille Bened	
22	8 March 2024	(Austria) Obertilliach (7), (8)	7.5 km SPR	(Germany) Stefanie Scherer	(Norway) Gro Randby	(France) Océane Michelon	
23	9 March 2024	(Austria) Obertilliach (7), (8)	12.5 km MSS	(France) Anaëlle Bondoux	(France) Océane Michelon	(Germany) Emily Schumann	
16th IBU Cup Overall (30 November 2023 – 9 March 2024)				(France) Océane Michelon	(Norway) Jenny Enodd	(Norway) Karoline Erdal	

=== Overall leaders ===
No.	Holder	Date gained	Place	Date forfeited	Place	Number of competitions
1.	(France) Jeanne Richard	30 November 2023	(Finland) Kontiolahti	10 December 2023	(Sweden) Idre Fjäll	4
2.	(Norway) Karoline Erdal	10 December 2023	(Sweden) Idre Fjäll	13 December 2023	(Norway) Sjusjøen	1
3.	(France) Jeanne Richard	13 December 2023	(Norway) Sjusjøen	4 January 2024	(Italy) Martell-Val Martello	3
4.	(Norway) Jenny Enodd	4 January 2024	(Italy) Martell-Val Martello	27 January 2024	(Slovakia) Brezno-Osrblie	7
5.	(Norway) Ida Lien	27 January 2024	(Slovakia) Brezno-Osrblie	1 February 2024	(Germany) Arber	1
6.	(Norway) Jenny Enodd	1 February 2024	(Germany) Arber	8 March 2024	(Austria) Obertilliach	5
7.	(France) Océane Michelon	8 March 2024	(Austria) Obertilliach	Overall Winner		2

=== Standings ===
==== Overall ====
Rank	after all 23 events	Points
	(France) Océane Michelon	803
2	(Norway) Jenny Enodd	708
3	(Norway) Karoline Erdal	691
4	(France) Anaëlle Bondoux	657
5	(Germany) Emily Schumann	597
6	(Norway) Maren Kirkeeide	589
7	(Norway) Ida Lien	577
8	(Norway) Emilie Ågheim Kalkenberg	488
9	(Germany) Julia Tannheimer	481
10	(Sweden) Ella Halvarsson	476

==== Under 25 ====
Rank	after all 23 events	Points
	(France) Océane Michelon	803
2	(France) Anaëlle Bondoux	657
3	(Germany) Emily Schumann	597
4	(Norway) Maren Kirkeeide	589
5	(Germany) Julia Tannheimer	481
6	(Sweden) Ella Halvarsson	476
7	(Sweden) Anna-Karin Heijdenberg	464
8	(Norway) Gro Randby	454
9	(France) Camille Bened	449
10	(Germany) Johanna Puff	431

==== Individual ====
Rank	after all 4 events	Points
	(Norway) Maren Kirkeeide	215
2	(Germany) Emily Schumann	125
3	(Norway) Karoline Erdal	120
4	(France) Chloé Chevalier	107
5	(Switzerland) Flurina Volken	98

==== Sprint ====
Rank	after all 11 events	Points
	(France) Océane Michelon	398
2	(Norway) Karoline Erdal	375
3	(Sweden) Anna-Karin Heijdenberg	321
4	(Norway) Jenny Enodd	306
5	(France) Anaëlle Bondoux	285

==== Pursuit ====
Rank	after all 5 events	Points
	(France) Océane Michelon	206
2	(Norway) Jenny Enodd	197
3	(Norway) Ida Lien	170
4	(France) Anaëlle Bondoux	138
5	(Norway) Karoline Erdal	138

==== Mass start ====
Rank	after all 3 events	Points
	(France) Anaëlle Bondoux	150
2	(France) Océane Michelon	125
3	(Norway) Jenny Enodd	123
4	(Norway) Ida Lien	120
5	(Norway) Gro Randby	103

==== Nations Cup ====
Rank	after all 23 events	Points
1	Norway	8003
2	France	7475
3	Germany	7350
4	Sweden	7087
5	Austria	6716

== Mixed Relay ==
#	Date	Place (In brackets Stage)	Discipline	Winner	Second	Third	Leader (After competition)	R.
1	3 December 2023	(Finland) Kontiolahti (1)	4 x 6 km	Norway: 1. Maren Kirkeeide; 2. Emilie Ågheim Kalkenberg; 3. Johan-Olav Botn; 4. Mats Øverby	Sweden: 1. Sara Andersson; 2. Anna-Karin Heijdenberg; 3. Emil Nykvist; 4. Henning Sjökvist	France: 1. Jeanne Richard; 2. Océane Michelon; 3. Théo Guiraud-Poillot; 4. Oscar Lombardot	Norway	
2	3 December 2023	(Finland) Kontiolahti (1)	6 km + 7.5 km	Norway: 1. Karoline Erdal; 2. Martin Nevland	France: 1. Paula Botet; 2. Rémi Broutier	Italy: 1. Sara Scatollo; 2. Daniele Cappellari	Norway	
3	13 January 2024	(Italy) Ridnaun-Val Ridanna (5)	4 x 6 km	Norway: 1. Emilie Ågheim Kalkenberg; 2. Ida Lien; 3. Johan-Olav Botn; 4. Mats Øverby	Germany: 1. Selina Grotian; 2. Emily Schumann; 3. Simon Kaiser; 4. Danilo Riethmüller	France: 1. Gilonne Guigonnat; 2. Anaëlle Bondoux; 3. Damien Levet; 4. Antonin Guigonnat	Norway	
4	13 January 2024	(Italy) Ridnaun-Val Ridanna (5)	6 km + 7.5 km	Norway: 1. Karoline Erdal; 2. Vebjørn Sørum	France: 1. Camille Bened; 2. Theo Guiraud Poillot	Finland: 1. Noora Kaisa Keränen; 2. Tuomas Harjula	Norway	
5	28 January 2024	(Slovakia) Brezno-Osrblie (ECH)	4 x 6 km	Norway: 1. Isak Frey; 2. Johan-Olav Botn; 3. Ida Lien; 4. Maren Kirkeeide	France: 1. Théo Guiraud-Poillot; 2. Antonin Guigonnat; 3. Océane Michelon; 4. Camille Bened	Italy: 1. Nicola Romanin; 2. Nicolò Betemps; 3. Beatrice Trabucchi; 4. Hannah Auchentaller	Norway	
6	28 January 2024	(Slovakia) Brezno-Osrblie (ECH)	6 km + 7.5 km	Sweden: 1. Anton Ivarsson; 2. Sara Andersson	Norway: 1. Vebjørn Sørum; 2. Emilie Ågheim Kalkenberg	Austria: 1. Patrick Jakob; 2. Kristina Oberthaler	Norway	
7	3 March 2024	(Austria) Obertilliach (7)	4 x 6 km	Norway: 1. Åsne Skrede; 2. Ragnhild Femsteinevik; 3. Sindre Fjellheim Jorde; 4. Mats Øverby	Italy: 1. Astrid Plosch; 2. Francesca Brocchiero; 3. Nicola Romanin; 4. David Zingerle	France: 1. Camille Bened; 2. Chloé Chevalier; 3. Ambroise Meunier; 4. Damien Levet	Norway	
8	3 March 2024	(Austria) Obertilliach (7)	6 km + 7.5 km	Norway: 1. Karoline Erdal; 2. Martin Nevland	France: 1. Paula Botet; 2. Émilien Claude	Germany: 1. Lisa Maria Spark; 2. David Zobel	Norway	

=== Rankings ===
Rank	after all 8 events	Points
1	Norway	705
2	France	512
3	Sweden	431
4	Germany	402
5	Italy	393

== Podium table by nation ==
Table showing the World Cup podium places (gold–1st place, silver–2nd place, bronze–3rd place) by the countries represented by the athletes.

Rank	Nation	Gold	Silver	Bronze	Total
1	Norway	36	30	21	87
2	Germany	9	6	7	22
3	France	7	10	11	28
4	Sweden	1	2	5	8
5	Italy	1	2	3	6
6	Austria	0	1	3	4
7	Belgium	0	1	0	1
7	Moldova	0	1	0	1
7	Romania	0	1	0	1
10	Czech Republic	0	0	1	1
10	Finland	0	0	1	1
10	Slovakia	0	0	1	1
10	Ukraine	0	0	1	1
Totals (13 entries)		54	54	54	162

== Points distribution ==
The table shows the number of points won in the 2023–24 Biathlon IBU Cup for men and women.

Place	1	2	3	4	5	6	7	8	9	10	11	12	13	14	15	16	17	18	19	20	21	22	23	24	25	26	27	28	29	30	31	32	33	34	35	36	37	38	39	40
Individual	90	75	60	50	45	40	36	34	32	31	30	29	28	27	26	25	24	23	22	21	20	19	18	17	16	15	14	13	12	11	10	9	8	7	6	5	4	3	2	1
Sprint	90	75	60	50	45	40	36	34	32	31	30	29	28	27	26	25	24	23	22	21	20	19	18	17	16	15	14	13	12	11	10	9	8	7	6	5	4	3	2	1
Pursuit	90	75	60	50	45	40	36	34	32	31	30	29	28	27	26	25	24	23	22	21	20	19	18	17	16	15	14	13	12	11	10	9	8	7	6	5	4	3	2	1
Mass Start	90	75	60	50	45	40	36	34	32	31	30	29	28	27	26	25	24	23	22	21	20	19	18	17	16	15	14	13	12	11	10	9	8	7	6	5	4	3	2	1

== Retirements ==
The following notable biathletes, who competed in the IBU Cup and never participated in the World Cup, are expected to retire during or after the 2023–24 season:

Men

- (France) Martin Bourgeois République
- (Russia) Mikhail Pervushin
- (Germany) Dominic Schmuck
- (Germany) Johannes Werner Donhauser
- (Canada) Reid Lovstrom
- (Slovenia) Jasa Zidar
- (Russia) Evgenii Idinov
- (Ukraine) Andrii Orlyk

Women

- (France) Chloé Bened
- (Norway) Jenny Enodd
- (Czech Republic) Tereza Jandová
- (Belarus) Yuliya Kavaleuskaya
- (Belarus) Natallia Karnitskaya
- (Slovakia) Kristina Makovinyova
- (Ukraine) Anastasiia Rasskazova
- (Ukraine) Oksana Moskalenko

== See also ==
- 2023–24 Biathlon World Cup (as the highest competition series of IBU).
- 2024 Biathlon World Championships
- 2024 IBU Open European Championships
- 2024 Winter Youth Olympics
- 2024 IBU Junior World Championships
- 2024 IBU Junior Open European Championships
