= 2025–26 Biathlon World Cup – Stage 4 =

2025–26 Biathlon World Cup Stage

The 2025–26 Biathlon World Cup – Stage 4 was the fourth event of the season and was held in Oberhof, Germany, from 8 to 11 January 2026. The event consisted of two individual competitions and two relay races, one by men and one by women. After all the races of the stage, Tommaso Giacomel leads the overall World Cup standings for men, and Lou Jeanmonnot leads for women. U-23 World Cup ranking leaders after the events in Oberhof were Isak Frey for men and Maren Kirkeeide for the women.

Overall World Cup standings leaders after stage 4

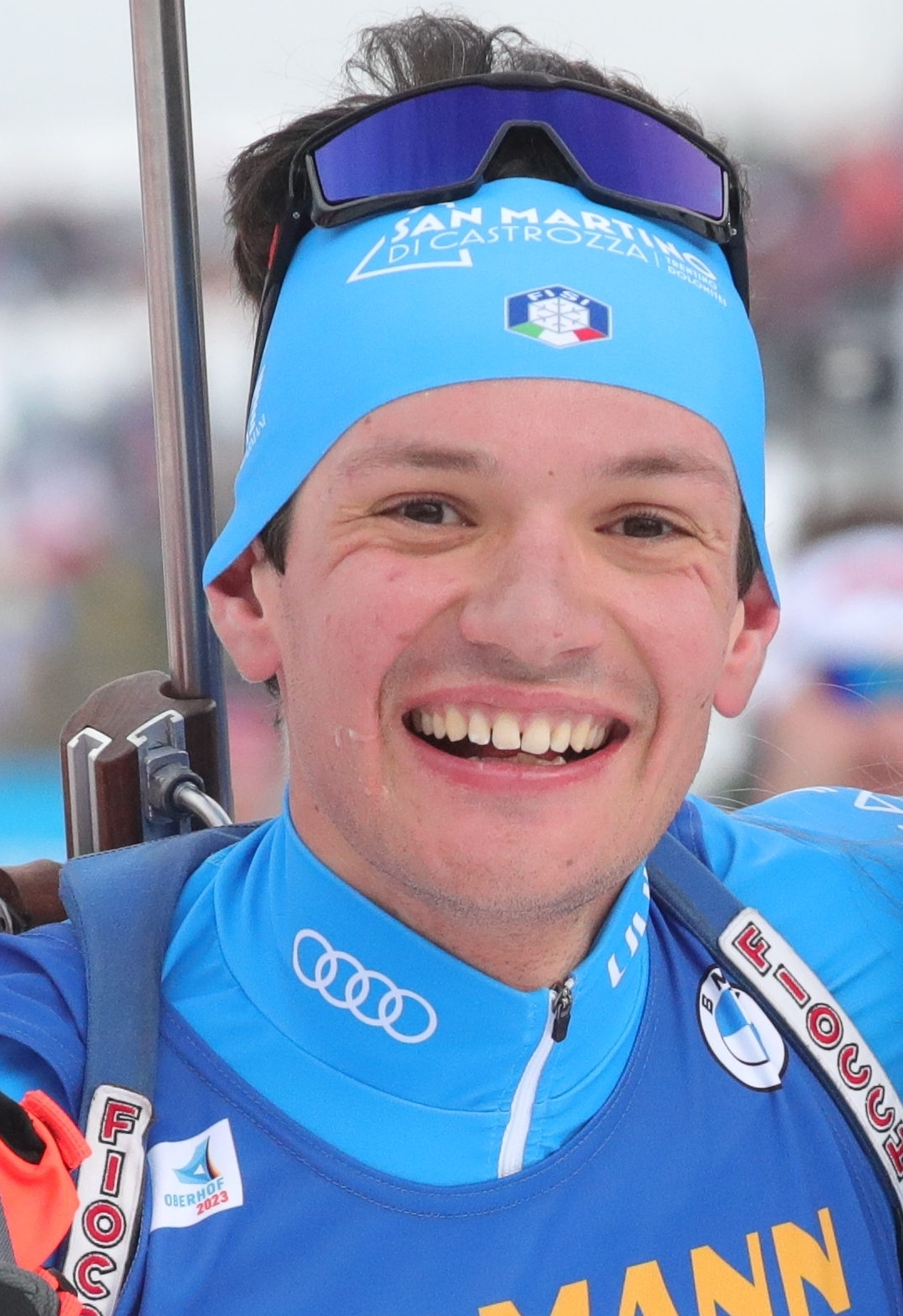
Tommaso Giacomel

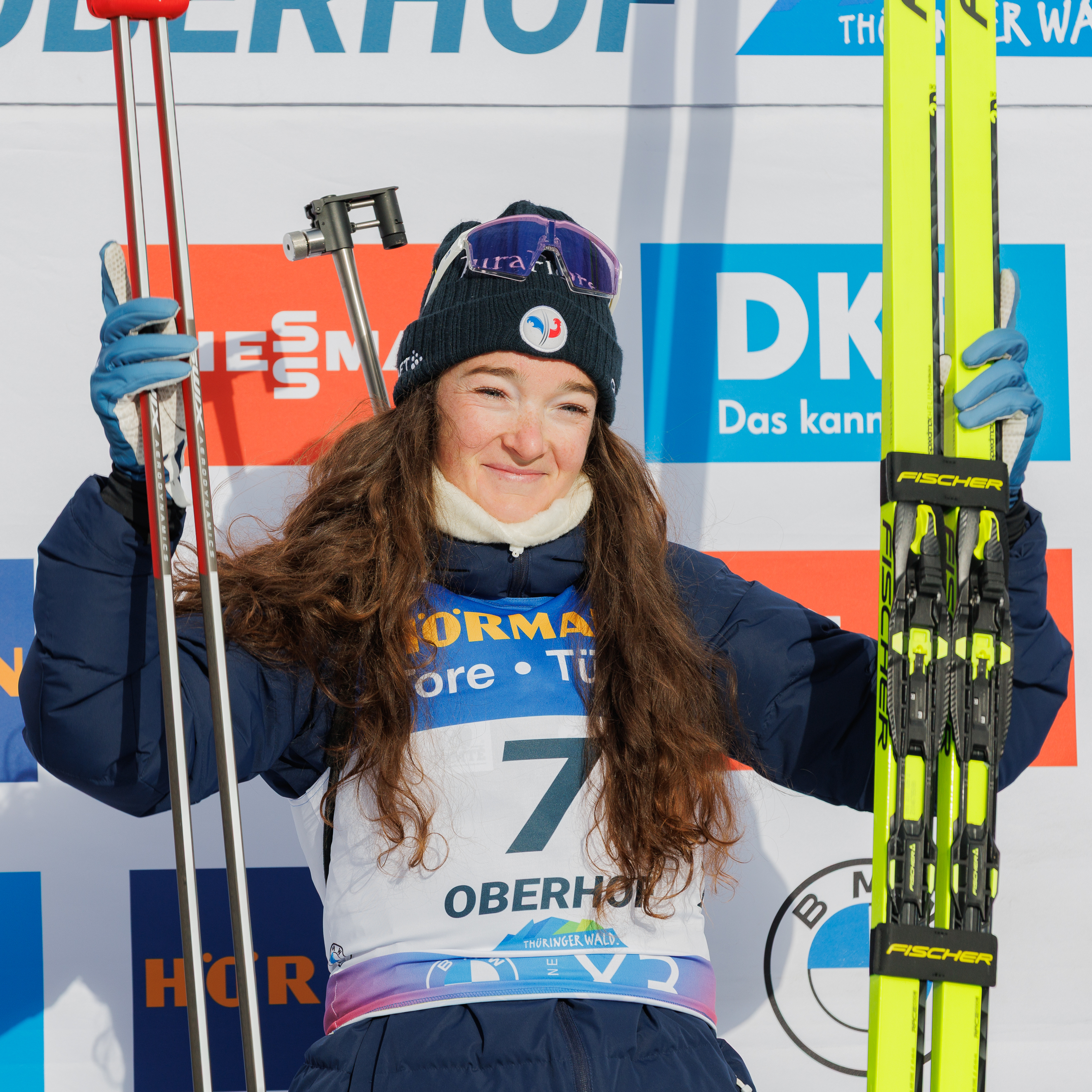
Lou Jeanmonnot

== Stage overview ==
Following the sudden death of Sivert Guttorm Bakken ahead of the Oberhof stage significant changes have been made to the Norwegian men's national team. Isak Frey whose participation was initially planned for the IBU Cup in Arber has been brought back into the main team to replace Bakken. Additionally due to mental exhaustion and physical condition the overall World Cup leader Johan-Olav Botn and Sturla Holm Lægreid have decided to skip this stage. They have been replaced by Sverre Dahlen Aspenes and Martin Nevland, who is making his debut for the Norwegian main national team.

International Biathlon Union also decided to begin the men's sprint with a minute of silence for Sivert Guttorm Bakken, assigning him the symbolic starting bib number one. The competition itself began with the second starting number.

Significant changes also affected the German team, where Johannes Kühn and Lucas Fratzscher were brought into the main squad to replace Danilo Riethmüller and Simon Kaiser. Additionally, Selina Grotian returned after a prolonged illness, replacing Julia Kink. The Swedish team lost Ella Halvarsson for this stage due to illness; she was replaced by Linn Gestblom, who had missed the previous stage. The French team made adjustments to its main squad, replacing Paula Botet with Jeanne Richard, who was only cleared to compete in the mass start race at the previous stage. Also making her season debut for the first time was Olympic champion Ukrainian biathlete Yuliia Dzhima, who missed the start of the season due to a hand injury. Other notable returns for the Oberhof stage include Switzerland's Niklas Hartweg, a multiple World Cup podium finisher, who missed the previous two stages. Jessica Jislová and Tomáš Mikyska have been brought back into the Czech Republic's main national team.

Among the notable absences from the stage are Dorothea Wierer and Lisa Vittozzi, who are strategically skipping the event to prepare for the 2026 Olympics. In the Austrian team, due to illness, their leader Lisa Theresa Hauser, as well as Anna Andexer and David Komatz, are missing the stage. The stage is being strategically skipped by the leader of the Slovak women's team, Paulína Bátovská Fialková, and Ema Kapustová will also not be participating in the races due to illness. In the Polish team, Natalia Sidorowicz is also missing the stage.

Additionally, for the first time in the history of World Cup biathlon competitions, a Refugee Biathlon Team made its debut, marked by the participation of 21-year-old Darya Dolidovich, a refugee from Belarus who trains with the Polish national team. In her debut race at this level, Dolidovich finished 68th in the sprint.

== Schedule of events ==
The events took place at the following times.

Date	Time	Events
8 January	11:30 CET	Men's 10 km Sprint
8 January	14:15 CET	Women's 7.5 km Sprint
10 January	12:00 CET	Men's 12.5 km Pursuit
10 January	14:25 CET	Women's 4X6 km Relay
11 January	11:00 CET	Men's 4X7.5 km Relay
11 January	14:30 CET	Women's 10 km Pursuit

== Medal winners ==
=== Men ===
Event:	Gold:	Time	Silver:	Time	Bronze:	Time
10 km Sprint	Tommaso Giacomel; Italy	25:01.7 (1+0)	Philipp Nawrath; Germany	25:14.9 (0+1)	Johannes Dale-Skjevdal; Norway	25:26.9 (1+0)
12.5 km Pursuit	Tommaso Giacomel; Italy	37:15.4 (2+2+2+0)	Martin Uldal; Norway	+4.5 (0+1+0+3)	Sebastian Samuelsson; Sweden	+8.8 (1+2+2+1)
4 x 7.5 km Men Relay	Norway; Isak Frey; Johannes Dale-Skjevdal; Martin Uldal; Vetle Sjåstad Christiansen	1:20:29.1 (0+0) (0+0) (0+1) (2+3) (0+0) (0+0) (0+1) (0+2)	France; Fabien Claude; Emilien Jacquelin; Quentin Fillon Maillet; Éric Perrot	1:20:31.7 (0+0) (0+0) (2+3) (0+2) (0+0) (0+1) (0+1) (0+2)	Sweden; Jesper Nelin; Malte Stefansson; Martin Ponsiluoma; Sebastian Samuelsson	1:20:32.9 (0+0) (0+1) (0+3) (0+1) (0+3) (0+0) (0+3) (0+1)

=== Women ===
Event:	Gold:	Time	Silver:	Time	Bronze:	Time
7.5 km Sprint	Elvira Öberg; Sweden	22:00.6 (0+0)	Suvi Minkkinen; Finland	22:21.7 (0+0)	Julia Simon; France	22:24.2 (0+0)
4 x 6 km Women Relay	France; Lou Jeanmonnot; Océane Michelon; Justine Braisaz-Bouchet; Julia Simon	1:18:21.9 (0+0) (0+3) (0+0) (0+2) (0+1) (0+0) (0+2) (0+0)	Norway; Marthe Kråkstad Johansen; Ingrid Landmark Tandrevold; Karoline Offigstad Knotten; Maren Kirkeeide	1:19:15.6 (0+0) (0+0) (0+0) (1+3) (0+2) (0+2) (0+0) (0+0)	Germany; Selina Grotian; Julia Tannheimer; Janina Hettich-Walz; Franziska Preuß	1:19:50.3 (0+0) (1+3) (0+3) (0+2) (0+1) (0+1) (0+0) (0+3)
10 km Pursuit	Elvira Öberg; Sweden	31:38.5 (0+1+0+0)	Suvi Minkkinen; Finland	+16.6 (0+1+0+0)	Hanna Öberg; Sweden	+1:04.5 (1+0+1+0)

== Achievements ==
Best individual performance for all time

Men

- (Norway) Sverre Dahlen Aspenes (28) reached No. 16 on pursuit race
- (Norway) Martin Nevland (24) reached No. 20 on sprint race
- (Poland) Grzegorz Galica (18) reached No. 23 on pursuit race
- (Slovakia) Jakub Borgula (21) reached No. 31 on sprint race
- (Slovakia) Martin Matko (20) reached No. 39 on pursuit race
- (Belgium) Sam Parmantier (20) reached No. 79 on sprint race
- (Slovenia) Ruj Grošelj Simić (20) reached No. 84 on sprint race
- (United Kingdom) Graham Benson (19) reached No. 95 on sprint race

Women

- (Canada) Nadia Moser (28) reached No. 19 on sprint race
- (United States) Luci Anderson (25) reached No. 21 on sprint race
- (Slovakia) Mária Remeňová (25) reached No. 34 on sprint race
- (Italy) Linda Zingerle (23) reached No. 40 on sprint race
- Darya Dolidovich (21) reached No. 68 on sprint race
- (Slovenia) Manca Caserman (19) reached No. 73 on sprint race
- (Austria) Lara Wagner (23) reached No. 83 on sprint race

First World Cup individual race

Men

- (Norway) Martin Nevland (24) reached No. 20 on sprint race
- (Slovenia) Ruj Grošelj Simić (20) reached No. 84 on sprint race
- (United Kingdom) Graham Benson (19) reached No. 95 on sprint race

Women

- Darya Dolidovich (21) reached No. 68 on sprint race
- (Slovenia) Manca Caserman (19) reached No. 73 on sprint race
