= 2022–23 Biathlon IBU Cup =

2022–2023 season of the Biathlon IBU Cup

Discipline	Men	Women
Overall	(Norway) Endre Strømsheim	(Sweden) Tilda Johansson
U25	(Norway) Vebjørn Sørum	(Sweden) Tilda Johansson
Individual	(Norway) Endre Strømsheim	(Germany) Lisa Maria Spark
Sprint	(Norway) Endre Strømsheim	(France) Paula Botet
Pursuit	(Norway) Martin Uldal	(Norway) Marthe K. Johansen
Super sprint	(Germany) Lucas Fratzscher (Norway) Mats Øverby	(Norway) Maren Kirkeeide
Mass start	(Norway) Martin Uldal	(France) Gilonne Guigonnat
Nations Cup	Norway	Norway
- Mixed: Norway

Competition
Edition	15th	15th
Locations	8	8
Individual	22	22
Mixed	6	6
Cancelled	3	3

The 2022–23 Biathlon IBU Cup was a multi-race tournament over a season of biathlon, organised by the IBU. It is the second-rank competition in biathlon after the Biathlon World Cup. The season started on 29 November 2022 in Idre Fjäll, Sweden and ended on 4 March 2023 in Canmore, Canada.

Erlend Bjøntegaard from Norway and Lou Jeanmonnot from France were the defending overall champions from the 2021–22 season.

== Map of world cup hosts ==
All 9 locations hosting IBU Cup events in this season (including Lenzerheide – venue of the European Championships).

Europe	North America 2022–23 Biathlon IBU Cup (North America) European Championships

== Calendar ==
Stage	Location	Date	Individual / Short individual	Super sprint	Sprint	Pursuit	Mass start	Relay	Mixed relay	Single mixed relay	Details
1	(Norway) Sjusjøen	24–27 November			●●				●	●	cancelled
2	(Sweden) Idre Fjäll	29 November–4 December	●		●●	●					
3	(Italy) Ridnaun-Val Ridanna	15–18 December			●	●	●				
4	(Slovakia) Brezno-Osrblie	5–8 January		●	●				●	●	
5	(Slovenia) Pokljuka	13–15 January	●		●●						relocated from Arber
EC	(Switzerland) Lenzerheide	25–29 January	●		●	●			●	●	European Championships
6	(Austria) Obertilliach	2–4 February			●●						
7	(Canada) Canmore	25–28 February		●	●		●				
8	(Canada) Canmore	1–4 March			●	●			●	●	
Total: 55 (26 men's, 26 women's, 3 mixed)			3	2	11	4	2		3	3	

== Men ==
=== Calendar ===
Stage	Season	Date	Place	Discipline	Winner	Second	Third	Yellow bib (After competition)	Dark blue bib (After competition)	Ref.
1		24 November 2022	(Norway) Sjusjøen	10 km Sprint	cancelled					
1		26 November 2022	(Norway) Sjusjøen	10 km Sprint	cancelled					
2	1	29 November 2022	(Sweden) Idre Fjäll	10 km Sprint	(Norway) Endre Strømsheim	(Norway) Mats Øverby	(Germany) Philipp Horn	(Norway) Endre Strømsheim	(Norway) Mats Øverby	
2	2	30 November 2022	(Sweden) Idre Fjäll	12.5 km Pursuit	(Norway) Martin Uldal	(Norway) Endre Strømsheim	(Norway) Mats Øverby	(Norway) Endre Strømsheim	(Norway) Martin Uldal	
2	3	3 December 2022	(Sweden) Idre Fjäll	20 km Individual	(Norway) Endre Strømsheim	(Norway) Aleksander Fjeld Andersen	(Germany) Lucas Fratzscher	(Norway) Endre Strømsheim	(Norway) Mats Øverby	
2	4	4 December 2022	(Sweden) Idre Fjäll	10 km Sprint	(Norway) Endre Strømsheim	(Germany) Philipp Horn	(Latvia) Andrejs Rastorgujevs	(Norway) Endre Strømsheim	(Norway) Mats Øverby	
3	5	15 December 2022	(Italy) Ridnaun-Val Ridanna	10 km Sprint	(Norway) Endre Strømsheim	(France) Oscar Lombardot	(Norway) Martin Uldal	(Norway) Endre Strømsheim	(Norway) Mats Øverby	
3	6	17 December 2022	(Italy) Ridnaun-Val Ridanna	12.5 km Pursuit	(Norway) Mats Øverby	(France) Oscar Lombardot	(Norway) Aleksander Fjeld Andersen	(Norway) Endre Strømsheim	(Norway) Mats Øverby	
3	7	18 December 2022	(Italy) Ridnaun-Val Ridanna	15 km Mass Start	(Norway) Martin Uldal	(Norway) Erlend Bjøntegaard	(Germany) Lucas Fratzscher	(Norway) Endre Strømsheim	(Norway) Mats Øverby	
4	8	5 January 2023	(Slovakia) Brezno-Osrblie	7.5 km Super Sprint	(France) Éric Perrot	(Norway) Mats Øverby	(Norway) Martin Uldal	(Norway) Endre Strømsheim	(Norway) Mats Øverby	
4	9	7 January 2023	(Slovakia) Brezno-Osrblie	10 km Sprint	(France) Éric Perrot	(Norway) Isak Frey	(Norway) Endre Strømsheim	(Norway) Endre Strømsheim	(Norway) Mats Øverby	
5	10	13 January 2023	(Slovenia) Pokljuka	15 km Short Individual	(Norway) Sindre Fjellheim Jorde	(Norway) Mats Øverby	(Norway) Vebjørn Sørum	(Norway) Endre Strømsheim	(Norway) Mats Øverby	
5	11	14 January 2023	(Slovenia) Pokljuka	10 km Sprint	(Norway) Sindre Fjellheim Jorde	(Germany) Lucas Fratzscher	(Norway) Vebjørn Sørum	(Norway) Endre Strømsheim	(Norway) Mats Øverby	
5	12	15 January 2023	(Slovenia) Pokljuka	10 km Sprint	(Norway) Vebjørn Sørum	(Norway) Aleksander Fjeld Andersen	(Germany) Lucas Fratzscher	(Norway) Endre Strømsheim	(Norway) Mats Øverby	
EC	13	25 January 2023	(Switzerland) Lenzerheide	20 km Individual	(Norway) Endre Strømsheim	(Ukraine) Anton Dudchenko	(Slovenia) Lovro Planko	(Norway) Endre Strømsheim	(Norway) Mats Øverby	
EC	14	27 January 2023	(Switzerland) Lenzerheide	10 km Sprint	(Norway) Erlend Bjøntegaard	(Norway) Vebjørn Sørum	(Germany) Philipp Nawrath	(Norway) Endre Strømsheim	(Norway) Mats Øverby	
EC	15	28 January 2023	(Switzerland) Lenzerheide	12.5 km Pursuit	(Norway) Vebjørn Sørum	(Norway) Erlend Bjøntegaard	(Norway) Endre Strømsheim	(Norway) Endre Strømsheim	(Norway) Mats Øverby	
6	16	2 February 2023	(Austria) Obertilliach	10 km Sprint	(Norway) Endre Strømsheim	(Norway) Vebjørn Sørum	(Ukraine) Dmytro Pidruchnyi	(Norway) Endre Strømsheim	(Norway) Mats Øverby	
6	17	4 February 2023	(Austria) Obertilliach	10 km Sprint	(Norway) Vebjørn Sørum	(Norway) Endre Strømsheim	(Sweden) Anton Ivarsson	(Norway) Endre Strømsheim	(Norway) Mats Øverby	
7	18	25 February 2023	(Canada) Canmore	10 km Sprint	(Germany) Philipp Horn	(Norway) Vebjørn Sørum	(Norway) Johan-Olav Botn	(Norway) Endre Strømsheim	(Norway) Mats Øverby	
7	19	27 February 2023	(Canada) Canmore	7.5 km Super Sprint	(France) Émilien Claude	(Germany) Lucas Fratzscher	(Norway) Vebjørn Sørum	(Norway) Endre Strømsheim	(Norway) Mats Øverby	
7	20	28 February 2023	(Canada) Canmore	15 km Mass Start	(Norway) Aleksander Fjeld Andersen	(Norway) Martin Uldal	(Germany) Simon Kaiser	(Norway) Endre Strømsheim	(Norway) Mats Øverby	
8	21	1 March 2023	(Canada) Canmore	10 km Sprint	(Norway) Vebjørn Sørum	(Norway) Johan-Olav Botn	(Italy) Daniele Cappellari	(Norway) Endre Strømsheim	(Norway) Vebjørn Sørum	
8	22	3 March 2023	(Canada) Canmore	12.5 km Pursuit	(Norway) Johan-Olav Botn	(Norway) Vebjørn Sørum	(Germany) Lucas Fratzscher	(Norway) Endre Strømsheim	(Norway) Vebjørn Sørum	

=== Standings ===
==== Overall ====
Rank	after all 24 events	Points
Yellow bib	(Norway) Endre Strømsheim	1051
2	(Germany) Lucas Fratzscher	923
3	(Norway) Vebjørn Sørum	910
4	(Norway) Aleksander Fjeld Andersen	847
5	(Norway) Mats Øverby	812

==== Under 25 ====
Rank	after all 24 events	Points
Dark blue bib	(Norway) Vebjørn Sørum	910
2	(Norway) Mats Øverby	812
3	(Norway) Martin Uldal	694
4	(France) Oscar Lombardot	400
5	(France) Remi Broutier	400

==== Individual ====
Rank	after all 3 events	Points
Red bib	(Norway) Endre Strømsheim	225
2	(Norway) Mats Øverby	143
3	(Norway) Sindre Fjellheim Jorde	126
4	(Norway) Aleksander Fjeld Andersen	106
5	(Germany) Dominic Schmuck	102

==== Sprint ====
Rank	after all 13 events	Points
Red bib	(Norway) Endre Strømsheim	583
2	(Norway) Vebjørn Sørum	555
3	(Germany) Lucas Fratzscher	444
4	(Germany) Philipp Horn	423
5	(Norway) Aleksander Fjeld Andersen	394

==== Super sprint ====
Rank	after all 2 events	Points
Red bib	(Germany) Lucas Fratzscher (Norway) Mats Øverby	106
3	(Norway) Martin Uldal	105
4	(Norway) Aleksander Fjeld Andersen	95
5	(France) Émilien Claude (France) Éric Perrot	90

==== Pursuit ====
Rank	after all 4 events	Points
Red bib	(Norway) Martin Uldal	212
2	(Norway) Mats Øverby	187
3	(Norway) Endre Strømsheim	171
4	(Germany) Lucas Fratzscher	171
5	(Norway) Vebjørn Sørum	165

==== Mass start ====
Rank	after all 2 events	Points
Red bib	(Norway) Martin Uldal	165
2	(Norway) Aleksander Fjeld Andersen	135
3	(Germany) Lucas Fratzscher	110
4	(Italy) Daniele Cappellari	76
5	(Norway) Erlend Bjøntegaard	75

==== Nations Cup ====
Rank	after all 26 events	Points
1	Norway	8392
2	Germany	7324
3	France	6937
4	Italy	6409
5	Ukraine	6390

== Women ==
=== Calendar ===
Stage	Season	Date	Place	Discipline	Winner	Second	Third	Yellow bib (After competition)	Dark blue bib (After competition)	Ref.
1		24 November 2022	(Norway) Sjusjøen	10 km Sprint	cancelled					
1		26 November 2022	(Norway) Sjusjøen	10 km Sprint	cancelled					
2	1	29 November 2022	(Sweden) Idre Fjäll	7.5 km Sprint	(Norway) Marthe K. Johansen	(Germany) Janina Hettich-Walz	(Germany) Marion Wiesensarter	(Norway) Marthe K. Johansen	(Norway) Marthe K. Johansen	
2	2	30 November 2022	(Sweden) Idre Fjäll	10 km Pursuit	(Norway) Marthe K. Johansen	(France) Gilonne Guigonnat	(Germany) Marion Wiesensarter	(Norway) Marthe K. Johansen	(Norway) Marthe K. Johansen	
2	3	3 December 2022	(Sweden) Idre Fjäll	15 km Individual	(Germany) Janina Hettich-Walz	(Norway) Maren Kirkeeide	(Sweden) Mona Brorsson	(Norway) Marthe K. Johansen	(Norway) Marthe K. Johansen	
2	4	4 December 2022	(Sweden) Idre Fjäll	7.5 km Sprint	(Germany) Selina Grotian	(Sweden) Tilda Johansson	(Germany) Vanessa Hinz	(Norway) Marthe K. Johansen	(Norway) Marthe K. Johansen	
3	5	15 December 2022	(Italy) Ridnaun-Val Ridanna	7.5 km Sprint	(Italy) Federica Sanfilippo	(Germany) Vanessa Hinz	(France) Paula Botet	(Norway) Marthe K. Johansen	(Norway) Marthe K. Johansen	
3	6	17 December 2022	(Italy) Ridnaun-Val Ridanna	10 km Pursuit	(Norway) Maren Kirkeeide	(Italy) Federica Sanfilippo	(Germany) Vanessa Hinz	(Germany) Vanessa Hinz	(Norway) Maren Kirkeeide	
3	7	18 December 2022	(Italy) Ridnaun-Val Ridanna	12.5 km Mass Start	(France) Gilonne Guigonnat	(Slovenia) Anamarija Lampič	(Sweden) Tilda Johansson	(France) Gilonne Guigonnat	(France) Gilonne Guigonnat	
4	8	5 January 2023	(Slovakia) Brezno-Osrblie	7.5 km Super Sprint	(Norway) Maren Kirkeeide	(Norway) Frida Dokken	(France) Fany Bertrand	(Norway) Maren Kirkeeide	(Norway) Maren Kirkeeide	
4	9	7 January 2023	(Slovakia) Brezno-Osrblie	7.5 km Sprint	(Italy) Eleonora Fauner	(Italy) Hannah Auchentaller	(Norway) Juni Arnekleiv	(Norway) Maren Kirkeeide	(Norway) Maren Kirkeeide	
5	10	13 January 2023	(Slovenia) Pokljuka	12.5 km Short Individual	(Italy) Hannah Auchentaller	(Germany) Hanna Kebinger	(France) Paula Botet	(France) Gilonne Guigonnat	(France) Gilonne Guigonnat	
5	11	14 January 2023	(Slovenia) Pokljuka	7.5 km Sprint	(Germany) Hanna Kebinger	(Norway) Karoline Erdal	(Italy) Michela Carrara	(France) Gilonne Guigonnat	(France) Gilonne Guigonnat	
5	12	15 January 2023	(Slovenia) Pokljuka	7.5 km Sprint	(France) Paula Botet	(Germany) Hanna Kebinger	(Germany) Lisa Maria Spark	(France) Gilonne Guigonnat	(France) Gilonne Guigonnat	
EC	13	25 January 2023	(Switzerland) Lenzerheide	15 km Individual	(Germany) Lisa Maria Spark	(Ukraine) Yuliia Dzhima	(Germany) Selina Grotian	(France) Gilonne Guigonnat	(France) Gilonne Guigonnat	
EC	14	27 January 2023	(Switzerland) Lenzerheide	7.5 km Sprint	(Ukraine) Anastasiya Merkushyna	(Sweden) Tilda Johansson	(Germany) Vanessa Hinz	(Sweden) Tilda Johansson	(Sweden) Tilda Johansson	
EC	15	28 January 2023	(Switzerland) Lenzerheide	10 km Pursuit	(Germany) Selina Grotian	(Sweden) Tilda Johansson	(France) Gilonne Guigonnat	(Sweden) Tilda Johansson	(Sweden) Tilda Johansson	
6	16	2 February 2023	(Austria) Obertilliach	7.5 km Sprint	(Sweden) Tilda Johansson	(France) Sophie Chauveau	(Switzerland) Lydia Hiernickel	(Sweden) Tilda Johansson	(Sweden) Tilda Johansson	
6	17	4 February 2023	(Austria) Obertilliach	7.5 km Sprint	(Norway) Juni Arnekleiv	(Japan) Fuyuko Tachizaki	(Germany) Selina Grotian	(Sweden) Tilda Johansson	(Sweden) Tilda Johansson	
7	18	25 February 2023	(Canada) Canmore	7.5 km Sprint	(Norway) Maren Kirkeeide	(France) Paula Botet	(Ukraine) Khrystyna Dmytrenko	(Sweden) Tilda Johansson	(Sweden) Tilda Johansson	
7	19	26 February 2023	(Canada) Canmore	7.5 km Super Sprint	(Norway) Emilie Kalkenberg	(Italy) Michela Carrara	(France) Paula Botet	(Sweden) Tilda Johansson	(Sweden) Tilda Johansson	
7	20	28 February 2023	(Canada) Canmore	12.5 km Mass Start	(Norway) Marthe K. Johansen	(Germany) Mareike Braun	(France) Gilonne Guigonnat	(Sweden) Tilda Johansson	(Sweden) Tilda Johansson	
8	21	1 March 2023	(Canada) Canmore	7.5 km Sprint	(Norway) Emilie Kalkenberg	(France) Paula Botet	(Norway) Marthe K. Johansen	(Sweden) Tilda Johansson	(Sweden) Tilda Johansson	
8	22	3 March 2023	(Canada) Canmore	10 km Pursuit	(Norway) Marthe K. Johansen	(Norway) Emilie Kalkenberg	(Sweden) Ella Halvarsson	(Sweden) Tilda Johansson	(Sweden) Tilda Johansson	

=== Standings ===
==== Overall ====
Rank	after all 24 events	Points
Yellow bib	(Sweden) Tildа Johansson	844
2	(France) Gilonne Guigonnat	842
3	(France) Paula Botet	803
4	(Norway) Maren Kirkeeide	771
5	(Norway) Marthe K. Johansen	751

==== Under 25 ====
Rank	after all 24 events	Points
Dark Blue bib	(Sweden) Tildа Johansson	844
2	(France) Gilonne Guigonnat	842
3	(France) Paula Botet	803
4	(Norway) Maren Kirkeeide	771
5	(Norway) Marthe K. Johansen	751

==== Individual ====
Rank	after all 3 events	Points
Red bib	(Germany) Lisa Maria Spark	164
2	(Sweden) Tildа Johansson	121
3	(Germany) Selina Grotian	107
4	(Italy) Hannah Auchentaller	92
5	(France) Paula Botet	91

==== Sprint ====
Rank	after all 13 events	Points
Red bib	(France) Paula Botet	504
2	(Sweden) Tildа Johansson	429
3	(France) Gilonne Guigonnat	372
4	(Norway) Marthe K. Johansen	355
5	(Norway) Maren Kirkeeide	335

==== Super sprint ====
Rank	after all 2 events	Points
Red bib	(Norway) Maren Kirkeeide	140
2	(Norway) Emilie Kalkenberg	90
3	(Norway) Frida Dokken (Italy) Michela Carrara	75
5	(France) Paula Botet (France) Fany Bertrand	60

==== Pursuit ====
Rank	after all 4 events	Points
Red bib	(Norway) Marthe K. Johansen	209
2	(France) Gilonne Guigonnat	201
3	(Sweden) Tildа Johansson	187
4	(Norway) Maren Kirkeeide	172
5	(Germany) Selina Grotian	150

==== Mass start ====
Rank	after all 2 events	Points
Red bib	(France) Gilonne Guigonnat	150
2	(Norway) Marthe K. Johansen	90
3	(Germany) Mareike Braun	84
4	(Sweden) Tildа Johansson	82
5	(Slovenia) Anamarija Lampič	75

==== Nations Cup ====
Rank	after all 26 events	Points
1	Norway	7761
2	France	7472
3	Sweden	7200
4	Germany	7141
5	Austria	6653

== Mixed Relay ==
Stage	Season	Date	Place	Discipline	Winner	Second	Third	Leader (After competition)	Ref.
1		27 November 2022	(Norway) Sjusjøen	4 x 6 km	cancelled				
1		27 November 2022	(Norway) Sjusjøen	1 x 6 km + 1 x 7.5 km	cancelled				
4	1	8 January 2023	(Slovakia) Brezno-Osrblie	4 x 7.5 km	Norway Isak Frey; Endre Strømsheim; Juni Arnekleiv; Maren Kirkeeide	Germany Lucas Fratzscher; Philipp Nawrath; Marion Wiesensarter; Juliane Frühwirt	Sweden Anton Ivarsson; Oskar Brandt; Sara Andersson; Felicia Lindqvist	Norway	
4	2	8 January 2023	(Slovakia) Brezno-Osrblie	1 x 6 km + 1 x 7.5 km	Norway Mats Øverby; Frida Dokken	France Paul Fontaine; Paula Botet	Switzerland Gion Stalder; Flurina Volken	Norway	
EC	3	29 January 2023	(Switzerland) Lenzerheide	4 x 6 km	Norway Vebjørn Sørum; Erlend Bjøntegaard; Karoline Erdal; Maren Kirkeeide	Germany Lucas Fratzscher; Dominic Schmuck; Selina Grotian; Lisa Maria Spark	Sweden Anton Ivarsson; Malte Stefansson; Stina Nilsson; Tilda Johansson	Norway	
EC	4	29 January 2023	(Switzerland) Lenzerheide	1 x 6 km + 1 x 7.5 km	Norway Endre Strømsheim; Juni Arnekleiv	Switzerland Niklas Hartweg; Amy Baserga	France Émilien Claude; Paula Botet	Norway	
8	5	4 March 2023	(Canada) Canmore	4 x 7.5 km	Norway Aleksander Fjeld Andersen; Vebjørn Sørum; Emilie Kalkenberg; Maren Kirkeeide	Germany Lucas Fratzscher; Philipp Horn; Mareike Braun; Juliane Frühwirt	France Remi Broutier; Ambroise Meunier; Camille Bened; Gilonne Guigonnat	Norway	
8	6	4 March 2023	(Canada) Canmore	1 x 6 km + 1 x 7.5 km	Norway Martin Uldal; Marthe K. Johansen	Austria Patrick Jakob; Kristina Oberthaler	France Émilien Claude; Paula Botet	Norway	

=== Rankings ===
Rank	after all 6 events	Points
1	Norway	540
2	France	341
3	Germany	305
4	Austria	295
5	Switzerland	293

== Podium table by nation ==
Table showing the World Cup podium places (gold–1st place, silver–2nd place, bronze–3rd place) by the countries represented by the athletes.

Rank	Nation	Gold	Silver	Bronze	Total
1	Norway	34	20	12	66
2	Germany	6	11	15	32
3	France	5	7	9	21
4	Italy	3	3	2	8
5	Sweden	1	3	6	10
6	Ukraine	1	2	2	5
7	Switzerland	0	1	2	3
8	Slovenia	0	1	1	2
9	Austria	0	1	0	1
9	Japan	0	1	0	1
11	Latvia	0	0	1	1
Totals (11 entries)		50	50	50	150

== See also ==
- 2022–23 Biathlon World Cup
