= Jenny Enodd =

Norwegian biathlete (born 1996)

Personal information
- Nationality: Norwegian
- Born: 25 March 1996 (age 30) Budal, Norway

Sport
- Country: Norway
- Sport: Biathlon
Medal record
European Championships
Gold medal – first place	2022 Arber	Mixed relay
Bronze medal – third place	2022 Arber	Pursuit

Jenny Enodd (born 25 March 1996) is a former Norwegian biathlete. She became European champion with the mixed relay team in 2022 and was second overall in the IBU Cup in 2023/24.

== Career ==
Jenny Enodd competed for the Budal IL club. She competed in her first international biathlon race as part of the 2017/18 IBU Cup in Arber. In the 15 km individual race, she achieved a top 10 finish in ninth place with just one shooting miss. Totally Enodd has completed 91 races in her IBU Cup career. She has won once and made the podium six times in individual races. She ended her sports career after the 2023/24 season.

== Biathlon results ==
All results are sourced from the International Biathlon Union.

=== European Championships ===
2 medals (1 gold, 1 bronze)

Year	Individual	Sprint	Pursuit	Mixed Relay
(Italy) 2018 Ridnaun	36th	48th	38th	—
(Belarus) 2019 Minsk	42nd	13th	25th	5th
(Belarus) 2020 Minsk	—	51st	42nd	—
(Germany) 2022 Arber	31st	13th	Bronze	Gold
(Switzerland) 2023 Lenzerheide	43rd	—	—	—
(Slovakia) 2024 Brezno-Osrblie	29th	5th	27th	—
