= Emily Schumann =

German biathlete (born 2002)

Personal information
- Nationality: German
- Born: 14 November 2002 (age 23) Ilmenau, Germany

Sport
- Country: Germany
- Sport: Biathlon

Emily Schumann (born 14 November 2002) is a German biathlete. She participated in the European Biathlon Championships 2024 in Osrblie. In the 2023–24 season she finished fifth in the IBU Cup general classification.

== Career ==
Schumann started her biathlon career in 2008. She made her international debut in the 2023/24 season at the IBU Cup in Kontiolahti. At the beginning of 2024 at the IBU Cup in Martell she reached the podium for the first time with a second place in the short individual race. At the next stage in Ridnaun repeated the result in the mixed relay together with teammates Selina Grotian, Simon Kaiser and Danilo Riethmueller. After her achievements in the IBU Cup, she was entered for the 2024 European Championships, but did not have much success, her best performance being a 21st place in the sprint race. In the last race of the season at the IBU Cup, she was back on the podium with a third place in the mass start 60 race.

== Biathlon results ==
All results are sourced from the International Biathlon Union.

=== European Championships ===
0 medals

Year	Individual	Sprint	Pursuit	Mixed Relay
(Slovakia) 2024 Brezno-Osrblie	42nd	21st	34th	—
