= Biathlon Junior World Championships 2022 =

Biathlon event in the United States

- Location: Soldier Hollow, United States
- Dates: 23 February – 2 March

The 2022 Biathlon Junior World Championships was held from 23 February to 2 March 2022 in Soldier Hollow, United States.

The Russian Federation was not allowed to participate in the event due to its invasion of Ukraine.

== Schedule ==
All times are local (UTC–7).

Date	Time	Event
23 February	11:00	Youth Men's 12.5 km individual
23 February	14:00	Youth Women's 10 km individual
24 February	11:00	Junior Men's 15 km individual
24 February	14:00	Junior Women's 12.5 km individual
25 February	11:00	Youth Men's 7.5 km sprint
25 February	14:00	Youth Women's 6 km sprint
26 February	11:00	Junior Men's 10 km sprint
26 February	14:00	Junior Women's 7.5 km sprint
27 February	11:00	Youth Men's 10 km pursuit
27 February	12:00	Youth Women's 7.5 km pursuit
27 February	14:15	Junior Men's 12.5 km pursuit
27 February	15:20	Junior Women's 10 km pursuit
1 March	11:00	Youth Men's 3 × 7.5 km relay
1 March	14:00	Youth Women's 3 × 6 km relay
2 March	11:00	Junior Men's 4 × 7.5 km relay
2 March	14:00	Junior Women's 4 × 6 km relay

== Results ==
=== Junior events ===
==== Junior Men ====
Event	Gold		Silver		Bronze	
15 km individual details	Jonáš Mareček; Czech Republic	43:19.8 (1+0+1+0)	Vetle Rype Paulsen; Norway	43:36.8 (0+2+0+0)	Martin Uldal; Norway	43:51.5 (0+1+0+1)
10 km sprint details	Martin Nevland; Norway	24:24.5 (0+0)	Otto Invenius; Finland	24:36.4 (0+0)	Martin Uldal; Norway	24:45.3 (0+0)
12.5 km pursuit details	Martin Nevland; Norway	33:20.7 (2+0+1+0)	Blagoy Todev; Bulgaria	33:34.8 (1+0+0+0)	Martin Uldal; Norway	33:54.4 (0+0+2+1)
4 × 7.5 km relay details	France Oscar Lombardot; Rémi Broutier; Paul Fontaine; Jacques Jefferies	1:14:57.8 (0+1) (0+1) (0+1) (0+2) (0+1) (0+1) (0+0) (0+2)	Italy Iacopo Leonesio; David Zingerle; Michele Molinari; Elia Zeni	1:15:11.3 (0+1) (0+1) (0+1) (0+1) (0+1) (0+0) (0+0) (0+1)	Norway Mats Øverby; Martin Uldal; Jørgen Sæter; Martin Nevland	1:15:19.2 (0+2) (0+0) (0+0) (0+3) (0+0) (0+0) (0+1) (1+3)

==== Junior Women ====
Event	Gold		Silver		Bronze	
12.5 km individual details	Lisa Maria Spark; Germany	39:53.4 (0+1+0+0)	Océane Michelon; France	40:40.9 (0+1+0+1)	Tereza Voborníková; Czech Republic	40:47.1 (0+0+1+1)
7.5 km sprint details	Tereza Voborníková; Czech Republic	21:25.9 (1+0)	Rebecca Passler; Italy	21:26.3 (0+0)	Lisa Maria Spark; Germany	21:30.4 (0+1)
10 km pursuit details	Tereza Voborníková; Czech Republic	31:10.9 (0+2+1+0)	Hannah Auchentaller; Italy	31:17.1 (0+0+0+1)	Frida Dokken; Norway	31:20.6 (0+1+0+0)
4 × 6 km relay details	Italy Rebecca Passler; Linda Zingerle; Beatrice Trabucchi; Hannah Auchentaller	1:16:47.4 (0+1) (0+0) (0+2) (0+0) (0+1) (0+0) (0+2) (0+0)	Germany Johanna Puff; Mareike Braun; Luise Müller; Lisa Maria Spark	1:17:12.2 (0+1) (1+3) (0+0) (0+1) (0+0) (0+1) (0+0) (0+2)	France Camille Coupé; Noémie Remonnay; Océane Michelon; Jeanne Richard	1:19:38.8 (0+0) (0+1) (0+0) (0+1) (1+3) (0+2) (0+0) (0+3)

=== Youth events ===
==== Youth Men ====
Event	Gold		Silver		Bronze	
12.5 km individual details	Arttu Heikkinen; Finland	36:58.6 (1+1+0+0)	Jakub Borguľa; Slovakia	38:35.5 (1+0+1+0)	Albert Engelmann; Germany	39:00.9 (1+1+1+1)
7.5 km sprint details	Jakob Kulbin; Estonia	20:11.1 (0+0)	Jakub Borguľa; Slovakia	20:18.5 (1+0)	Albert Engelmann; Germany	20:19.5 (0+1)
10 km pursuit details	Jakub Borguľa; Slovakia	28:27.4 (0+0+0+1)	Albert Engelmann; Germany	28:57.7 (1+0+0+2)	Arttu Heikkinen; Finland	29:16.4 (2+0+0+1)
3 × 7.5 km relay details	Norway Stian Fedreheim; Andreas Aas; Isak Frey	58:15.0 (0+0) (0+2) (0+1) (0+1) (0+1) (0+2)	Germany Fabian Kaskel; Tim Nechwatal; Albert Engelmann	58:23.7 (0+1) (0+1) (0+1) (0+3) (0+3) (0+3)	Italy Marco Barale; Christoph Pircher; Nicolò Betemps	58:56.8 (0+0) (0+1) (0+1) (0+2) (0+1) (0+1)

==== Youth Women ====
Event	Gold		Silver		Bronze	
10 km individual details	Sara Andersson; Sweden	38:58.2 (0+2+0+1)	Iva Moric; Germany	39:08.0 (0+0+0+0)	Selina Grotian; Germany	39:15.2 (1+0+1+0)
6 km sprint details	Maren Kirkeeide; Norway	18:38.4 (0+1)	Lena Repinc; Slovenia	18:45.9 (1+0)	Iva Moric; Germany	18:47.4 (0+0)
7.5 km pursuit details	Selina Grotian; Germany	23:51.3 (0+0+1+0)	Lena Repinc; Slovenia	24:06.2 (0+1+0+0)	Sara Andersson; Sweden	24:30.7 (0+0+0+1)
3 × 6 km relay details	Italy Ilaria Scattolo; Fabiana Carpella; Sara Scattolo	53:15.2 (0+0) (0+2) (0+0) (0+0) (0+0) (0+1)	Germany Iva Moric; Marlene Fichtner; Selina Grotian	53:43.4 (0+0) (0+0) (0+2) (0+0) (0+0) (0+1)	Bulgaria Valentina Dimitrova; Stefani Yolova; Lora Hristova	54:57.8 (0+0) (0+2) (0+0) (0+1) (0+2) (0+0)

== Medal table ==
* Host nation (United States)

Rank	Nation	Gold	Silver	Bronze	Total
1	Norway	4	1	5	10
2	Czech Republic	3	0	1	4
3	Germany	2	5	5	12
4	Italy	2	3	1	6
5	Slovakia	1	2	0	3
6	Finland	1	1	1	3
6	France	1	1	1	3
8	Sweden	1	0	1	2
9	Estonia	1	0	0	1
10	Slovenia	0	2	0	2
11	Bulgaria	0	1	1	2
Totals (11 entries)		16	16	16	48
