= Biathlon World Championships 2025 – Women's relay =

Women's relay at the Biathlon World Championships 2025
- Venue: Roland Arena
- Location: Lenzerheide, Switzerland
- Dates: 22 February
- Competitors: 88 from 22 nations
- Teams: 22
- Winning time: 1:07:26.5

Medalists
gold medal	Lou Jeanmonnot; Océane Michelon; Justine Braisaz-Bouchet; Julia Simon	France
silver medal	Karoline Offigstad Knotten; Ingrid Landmark Tandrevold; Ragnhild Femsteinevik; Maren Kirkeeide	Norway
bronze medal	Anna Magnusson; Ella Halvarsson; Hanna Öberg; Elvira Öberg	Sweden

The Women's relay competition at the Biathlon World Championships 2025 was held on 22 February 2025.

== Results ==
The race was started at 12:05.

Rank	Bib	Team	Time	Penalties (P+S)	Deficit
1st place, gold medalist(s)	2	France Lou Jeanmonnot; Océane Michelon; Justine Braisaz-Bouchet; Julia Simon	1:07:26.5; 15:56.8; 16:48.2; 16:58.9; 17:42.6	0+2 0+2; 0+0 0+0; 0+0 0+1; 0+2 0+1; 0+0 0+0	
2nd place, silver medalist(s)	3	Norway Karoline Offigstad Knotten; Ingrid Landmark Tandrevold; Ragnhild Femsteinevik; Maren Kirkeeide	1:08:30.7; 16:28.8; 18:07.5; 16:49.5; 17:04.9	0+2 1+6; 0+0 0+0; 0+2 1+3; 0+0 0+2; 0+0 0+1	+1:04.2
3rd place, bronze medalist(s)	1	Sweden Anna Magnusson; Ella Halvarsson; Hanna Öberg; Elvira Öberg	1:09:11.0; 16:41.0; 17:46.7; 16:38.3; 18:05.0	1+5 0+3; 0+1 0+0; 0+1 0+2; 0+0 0+0; 1+3 0+1	+1:44.5
4	7	Austria Lea Rothschopf; Lisa Theresa Hauser; Tamara Steiner; Anna Andexer	1:09:16.6; 17:35.1; 16:45.0; 17:46.1; 17:10.4	0+0 1+5; 0+0 1+3; 0+0 0+0; 0+0 0+1; 0+0 0+1	+1:50.1
5	4	Germany Sophia Schneider; Selina Grotian; Julia Tannheimer; Franziska Preuß	1:09:24.9; 17:31.9; 17:05.8; 17:13.4; 17:33.8	0+3 1+7; 0+1 1+3; 0+2 0+1; 0+0 0+1; 0+0 0+2	+1:58.4
6	14	Slovakia Ema Kapustová; Paulína Bátovská Fialková; Anastasiya Kuzmina; Mária Remeňová	1:09:42.4; 16:45.9; 17:01.9; 17:35.7; 18:18.9	0+8 0+2; 0+0 0+0; 0+3 0+0; 0+3 0+0; 0+2 0+2	+2:15.9
7	6	Italy Hannah Auchentaller; Dorothea Wierer; Samuela Comola; Michela Carrara	1:10:13.7; 16:47.8; 17:32.0; 17:39.3; 18:14.6	1+5 0+7; 0+0 0+2; 0+1 0+2; 0+1 0+2; 1+3 0+1	+2:47.2
8	15	Slovenia Lena Repinc; Anamarija Lampič; Polona Klemenčič; Živa Klemenčič	1:10:22.9; 16:49.0; 16:42.6; 17:32.2; 19:19.1	0+5 1+6; 0+2 0+0; 0+0 0+3; 0+0 0+0; 0+3 1+3	+2:56.4
9	9	Poland Natalia Sidorowicz; Kamila Żuk; Anna Mąka; Joanna Jakieła	1:10:52.0; 16:43.3; 17:32.6; 19:03.6; 17:32.5	1+8 0+6; 0+2 0+1; 0+1 0+2; 1+3 0+3; 0+2 0+0	+3:25.5
10	11	Estonia Regina Ermits; Tuuli Tomingas; Susan Külm; Johanna Talihärm	1:11:03.8; 17:38.3; 17:38.2; 17:47.8; 17:59.5	1+8 0+4; 1+3 0+1; 0+2 0+1; 0+2 0+0; 0+1 0+2	+3:37.3
11	8	Ukraine Khrystyna Dmytrenko; Yuliia Dzhima; Olena Horodna; Anastasiya Merkushyna	1:11:18.8; 16:52.3; 17:44.5; 17:49.0; 18:53.0	0+8 0+6; 0+3 0+0; 0+1 0+2; 0+2 0+2; 0+2 0+2	+3:52.3
12	12	Czech Republic Jessica Jislová; Tereza Voborníková; Kateřina Pavlů; Ilona Plecháčová	1:11:46.9; 16:42.6; 17:13.6; 19:26.2; 18:24.5	0+9 0+2; 0+1 0+1; 0+3 0+0; 0+3 0+0; 0+2 0+1	+4:20.4
13	21	Belgium Maya Cloetens; Lotte Lie; Eve Bouvard; Marisa Emonts	1:12:03.0; 16:59.0; 17:17.7; 18:18.7; 19:27.6	0+3 0+4; 0+1 0+0; 0+0 0+1; 0+1 0+2; 0+1 0+1	+4:36.5
14	5	Switzerland Elisa Gasparin; Amy Baserga; Aita Gasparin; Lena Häcki-Groß	1:12:09.1; 17:47.3; 17:30.7; 17:05.8; 19:45.3	4+5 1+7; 0+1 1+3; 0+1 0+3; 0+0 0+0; 4+3 0+1	+4:42.6
15	10	Finland Inka Hämäläinen; Sonja Leinamo; Noora Kaisa Keränen; Suvi Minkkinen	1:12:36.1; 18:16.3; 18:05.6; 18:30.1; 17:44.1	2+7 0+6; 2+3 0+3; 0+3 0+1; 0+1 0+1; 0+0 0+1	+5:09.6
16	16	Latvia Estere Volfa; Baiba Bendika; Sanita Buliņa; Sandra Buliņa	1:14:17.7; 17:30.3; 17:05.8; 19:20.4; 20:21.2	3+10 1+8; 0+3 0+1; 0+1 0+2; 2+3 0+2; 1+3 1+3	+6:51.2
17	20	Lithuania Judita Traubaitė; Lidija Žurauskaitė; Natalija Kočergina; Sara Urumova	LAP; 17:19.9; 18:24.3	0+6 0+5; 0+1 0+2; 0+2 0+0; 0+3 0+3	
18	22	Romania Anastasia Tolmacheva; Andreea Mezdrea; Elena Chirkova; Adelina Rimbeu	LAP; 17:06.3; 19:40.8	1+3 0+3; 0+0 0+0; 1+3 0+3; 0+0 0+0	
19	18	United States Chloe Levins; Deedra Irwin; Lucinda Anderson; Margie Freed	LAP; 17:31.5; 18:36.1	1+3 3+4; 0+0 0+1; 1+3 0+0; 0+0 2+3	
20	13	Canada Pascale Paradis; Shilo Rousseau; Nadia Moser; Emma Lunder	LAP; 17:29.8; 19:16.3	1+5 2+6; 0+2 0+2; 1+3 0+1; 0+0 2+3	
21	19	Bulgaria Valentina Dimitrova; Milena Todorova; Maria Zdravkova; Lora Hristova	LAP; 17:55.3; 18:34.1	1+4 3+9; 1+3 0+3; 0+0 2+3; 0+1 1+3	
22	17	Kazakhstan Polina Yegorova; Galina Vishnevskaya-Sheporenko; Arina Kryukova; Aisha Rakisheva	LAP; 19:28.7	0+1 1+3; 0+1 1+3; 0+0 0+0	
