= Martin Nevland =

Norwegian biathlete (born 2001)

Personal information
- Nationality: Norwegian
- Born: 16 June 2001 (age 24) Ålgård, Norway

Sport
- Country: Norway
- Sport: Biathlon

Martin Nevland (born 16 June 2001) is a Norwegian biathlete. He is a seven-time youth and junior world champion.

== Career ==
Martin Nevland was already successful in cross-country skiing in 2018, finishing second among over 100 participants at the national junior championships. He made his international debut in biathlon at the 2019 Youth Olympic Festival, where he missed Top-10 finishes. The following year, he participated in the 2020 Junior World Championships in Lenzerheide and immediately achieved success. He secured 4th place in the sprint and won the individual, pursuit, and relay races convincingly with Martin Uldal and Morten Tørblad Sameien. Two years later, he returned to the Junior World Championships and once again became a double world champion, winning gold in the sprint and pursuit. In the relay event, he missed another gold medal due to a penalty lap in the final shooting. At the beginning of the 2022/23 winter season, Nevland made his debut in the IBU Cup and immediately finished 4th in the pursuit in Idre. Although he achieved two more fourth places in Ridnaun, he was removed from the team after the competitions in Osrblie. At the Junior World Championships in Shchuchinsk, Kazakhstan, he became a junior world champion again in the pursuit and relay events with Nevland, Trym Gerhardsen, Einar Hedegart, and Isak Frey.

Nevland reached his first individual podium in the IBU Cup in November 2023 in the individual event in Kontiolahti, finishing behind his compatriots Johan-Olav Botn and Mats Øverby. At the same location, he also won the single-mixed relay with Karoline Erdal.

== Biathlon results ==
All results are sourced from the International Biathlon Union.

=== World Cup ===
==== Team podiums ====
- 1 podium

No.	Season	Date	Location	Level	Race	Placement	Teammates
1	2025–26	24 January 2026	(Czech Republic) Nové Město	World Cup	Single Mixed Relay	3rd	Juni Arnekleiv

=== Youth and Junior World Championships ===
8 medal (7 gold, 1 bronze)

Year	Age	Individual	Sprint	Pursuit	Relay
(Switzerland) 2020 Lenzerheide	18	Gold	4th	Gold	Gold
(United States) 2022 Soldier Hollow	20	—	Gold	Gold	Bronze
(Kazakhstan) 2023 Shchuchinsk	21	6th	5th	Gold	Gold
