= Océane Michelon =

French biathlete (born 2002)

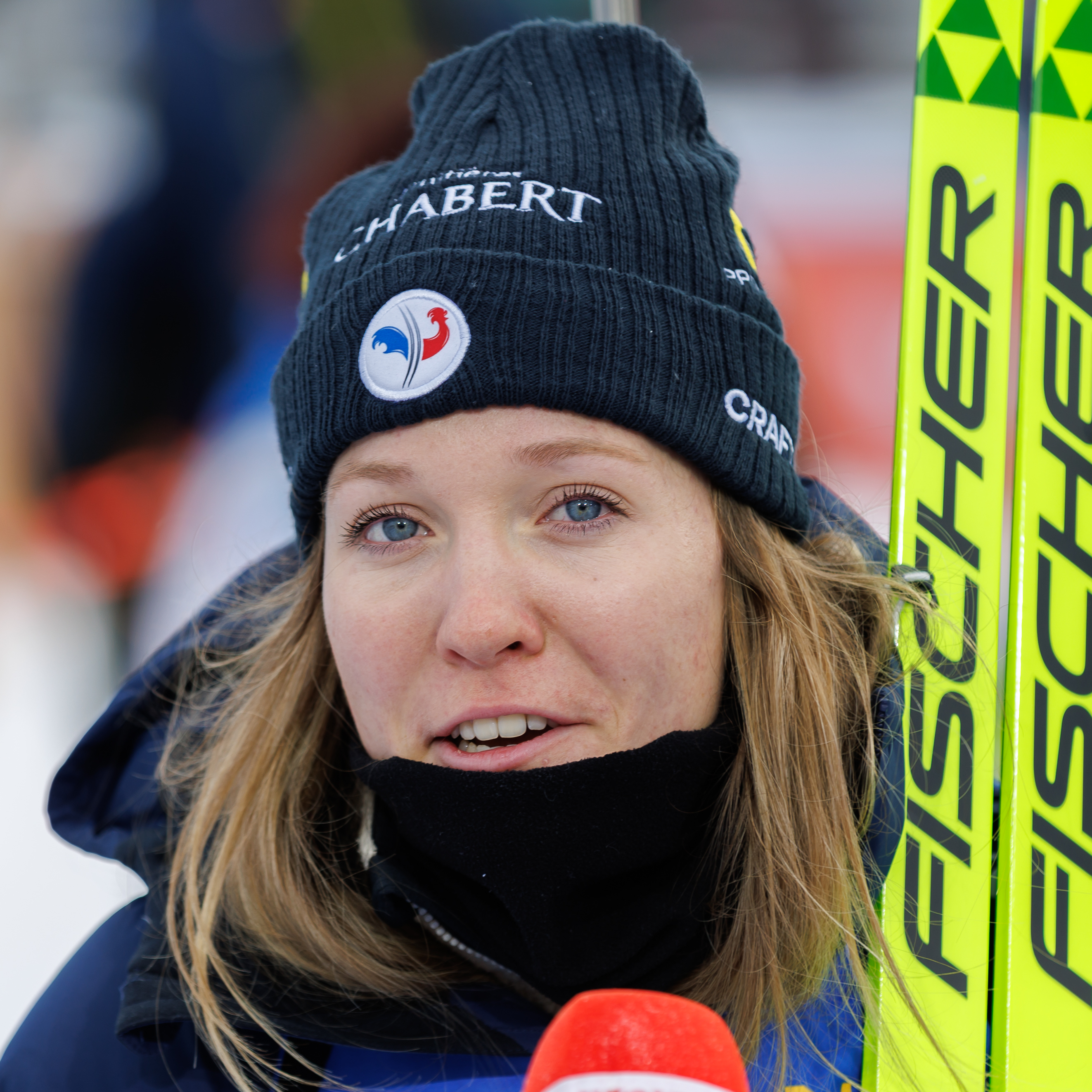
- Michelon in 2025

Personal information
- Nationality: French
- Born: 4 March 2002 (age 24) Chambéry, France

Sport

Professional information
- Sport: Biathlon
- Club: Bauges Ski Nordique
- IBU Cup debut: 2022
- World Cup debut: 2024

Olympic Games
- Teams: 1 (2026)
- Medals: 3 (2 gold)

World Championships
- Teams: 1 (2025)
- Medals: 2 (1 gold)
Medal record
Women's biathlon
Representing France
Olympic Games
Gold medal – first place	2026 Milano Cortina	12.5 km mass start
Gold medal – first place	2026 Milano Cortina	4 × 6 km relay
Silver medal – second place	2026 Milano Cortina	7.5 km sprint
World Championships
Gold medal – first place	2025 Lenzerheide	4 × 6 km relay
Silver medal – second place	2025 Lenzerheide	12.5 km mass start
European Championships
Silver medal – second place	2024 Osrblie	Mixed relay
Bronze medal – third place	2024 Osrblie	10 km pursuit
Junior World Championships
Silver medal – second place	2022 Soldier Hollow	12.5 km individual
Bronze medal – third place	2022 Soldier Hollow	4 × 6 km relay
Youth World Championships
Bronze medal – third place	2020 Lenzerheide	6 km sprint

Océane Michelon (French pronunciation: [ɔsean miʃlɔ̃]; born 4 March 2002) is a French biathlete. She has competed in the Biathlon World Cup since 2024. She is a two-time 2026 Winter Olympic champion in women's mass start and relay.

== Career ==
Océane Michelon gained her first international experience at the 2020 Youth World Championships in Lenzerheide, where she won bronze in the sprint behind Linda Zingerle and Liubov Kalinina. After another participation in the Youth World Championships the following year, the French athlete made her debut in the IBU Cup in January 2022 in Osrblie, achieving her first top-10 result in the individual event. She also participated in the European Championships at Arber, narrowly missing a medal in the mixed relay by just over ten seconds. In the sprint and pursuit events, she finished twelfth in both. Michelon won two more medals at the Junior World Championships: first in the individual event behind Lisa Maria Spark, and shortly after with the women's relay behind Italy and Germany. In the following winter, she competed in both the IBU Cup and the Junior Cup, securing a solo victory in an individual event in December 2022. The European Championships yielded no notable results, and her highest achievement in the IBU Cup was 18th place.

At the beginning of the 2023/24 season, Michelon achieved her first podium finish in the IBU Cup in Kontiolahti. In Sjusjøen, she then won her first race in the sprint, placing her third in the IBU Cup rankings after the first trimester. As a result, the French athlete will make her World Cup debut at the competitions in Oberhof.

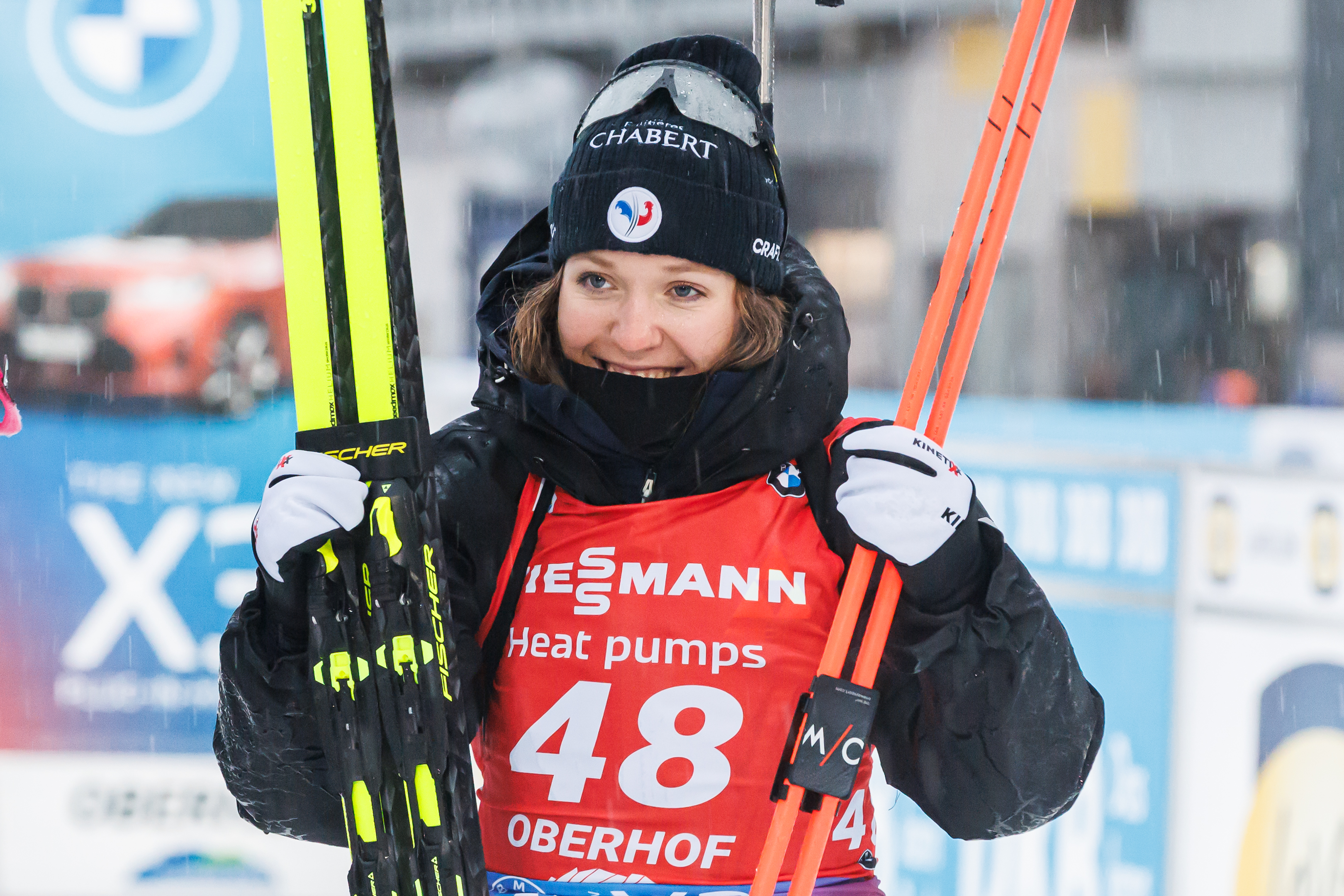
Michelon in 2025

== Biathlon results ==
All results are sourced from the International Biathlon Union.

=== Olympic Games ===
3 medals: 12.5 km mass start (gold), 4 x 6 km relay (gold), 7.5 km sprint (silver)

Event	Individual	Sprint	Pursuit	Mass start	Relay	Mixed relay
(Italy) 2026 Milano-Cortina	—	Silver	5th	Gold	Gold	—

*The mixed relay was added as an event in 2014.

=== World Championships ===
2 medals (1 gold, 1 silver)

Event	Individual	Sprint	Pursuit	Mass start	Relay	Mixed relay	Single mixed relay
(Switzerland) 2025 Lenzerheide	18th	12th	13th	Silver	Gold	—	—

=== World Cup ===
Season	Age	Overall			Individual		Sprint		Pursuit		Mass start	
Season	Age	Races	Points	Position	Points	Position	Points	Position	Points	Position	Points	Position
2023–24	21	4/21	21	74th	—	—	16	65th	5	74th	—	—
2024–25	22	21/21	760	5th	146	3rd	195	10th	238	5th	181	5th
2025–26	23	21/21	658	8th	55	20th	187	9th	226	10th	183	3rd

==== Individual podiums ====
No.	Season	Date	Location	Level	Race	Place
1	2024–25	23 February 2025	(Switzerland) Lenzerheide	World Championships	Mass Start	2nd
2	2024–25	8 March 2025	(Czech Republic) Nové Město na Moravě	World Cup	Pursuit	3rd
3	2025–26	5 December 2025	(Sweden) Östersund	World Cup	Sprint	3rd
4	2025–26	25 January 2026	(Czech Republic) Nové Město na Moravě	World Cup	Mass Start	2nd
5	2025–26	14 February 2026	(Italy) Antholz-Anterselva	Olympic Games	Sprint	2nd

==== Relay podiums ====
No.	Season	Date	Location	Level	Race	Place	Teammate
1	2024–25	17 January 2025	(Germany) Ruhpolding	World Cup	Relay	3rd	Botet, Braisaz-Bouchet, Simon
2	2024–25	26 January 2025	(Italy) Antholz-Anterselva	World Cup	Relay	3rd	Richard, Jeanmonnot, Simon
3	2024–25	22 February 2025	(Switzerland) Lenzerheide	World Championships	Relay	1st	Jeanmonnot, Braisaz-Bouchet, Simon
4	2025–26	29 November 2025	(Sweden) Östersund	World Cup	Relay	1st	Richard, Braisaz-Bouchet, Jeanmonnot

=== Youth and Junior World Championships ===
3 medals (1 silver, 2 bronze)

Year	Age	Individual	Sprint	Pursuit	Relay
(Switzerland) 2020 Lenzerheide	17	15th	Bronze	11th	5th
(Austria) 2021 Obertilliach	18	26th	23th	10th	—N/a
(United States) 2022 Soldier Hollow	19	Silver	28th	11th	Bronze
