= Mats Øverby =

Norwegian biathlete (born 2000)

Personal information
- Nationality: Norwegian
- Born: 13 May 2000 (age 26) Drammen, Norway

Sport
- Country: Norway
- Sport: Biathlon
Medal record
Men's biathlon
Representing Norway
Junior World Championships
| Silver medal – second place | 2021 Obertilliach | 4 × 7.5 km relay |
| Bronze medal – third place | 2022 Soldier Hollow | 4 × 7.5 km relay |

Mats Øverby (born 13 May 2000) is a Norwegian biathlete. He won the overall IBU Cup title in the 2023–24 season.

== Career ==
Mats Øverby had his first international appearances at the 2021 Junior World Championships in Obertilliach, Austria, where he narrowly missed a medal in the individual event, finishing fourth, and won silver in the relay event with Simen Kvarme, Fredrik Grusd, and Jørgen Sæter. The following year, he participated in the Junior World Championships in Soldier Hollow, Utah, and once again secured a medal with the relay team. Taking advantage of the absence of most top athletes at the Norwegian Championships, Øverby won bronze in the sprint and with the relay team. He was even more successful at the Junior Championships, winning titles with the team and in the mass start, earning him a spot in the B National Team for the following season.

In his debut in the IBU Cup, the Norwegian immediately showcased his skills, finishing among the top five in all four races he participated in. In Ridnaun, he secured his first title in the pursuit event, and in Osrblie, along with two more podium finishes, he followed up with another victory in the single mixed relay. At this point, he was in second place in the overall standings behind Endre Strømsheim. However, his first European Championships did not go as planned, and at the season finale in Canmore, he started with diminished strength due to a bout of coronavirus and fell to fifth place in the IBU Cup standings after relatively weak results.

== Biathlon results ==
All results are sourced from the International Biathlon Union.

=== Youth and Junior World Championships ===
2 medals (1 silver, 1 bronze)

| Year | Age | Individual | Sprint | Pursuit | Relay |
|---|---|---|---|---|---|
| (Austria) 2021 Obertilliach | 20 | 4th | 13th | 16th | Silver |
| (United States) 2022 Soldier Hollow | 21 | 17th | 6th | 5th | Bronze |
