= Sara Andersson =

Swedish biathlete (born 2003)

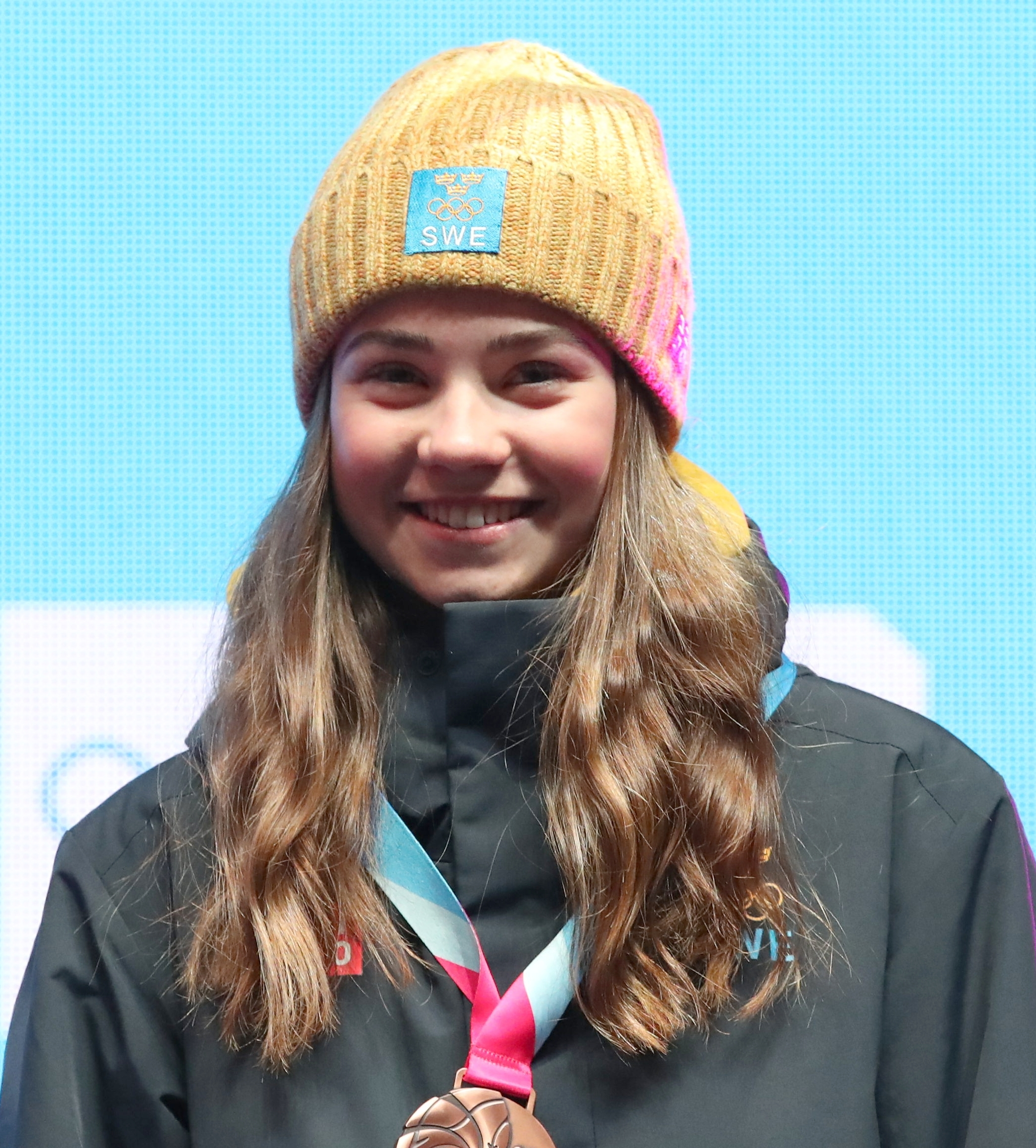

Personal information
- Nationality: Swedish
- Born: 13 January 2003 (age 23) Mora, Sweden
- Height: 1.68 m (5 ft 6 in)

Sport
- Country: Sweden
- Sport: Biathlon
- Club: IFK Mora
Medal record
Women's biathlon
Representing Sweden
European Championships
| Gold medal – first place | 2024 Osrblie | Single mixed relay |

Sara Paulina Andersson (born 13 January 2003) is a Swedish biathlete and cross-country skier. She has competed in the Biathlon World Cup since 2023. She won gold medal in the single mixed relay at the 2024 IBU Open European Championships.

== Career ==
=== Cross-country skiing ===
Andersson's international career in cross-country skiing began in the summer of 2019 at roller ski championships at the junior level in Madona, Latvia. In the following years, she exclusively participated in junior competitions in her home country. In February 2020, she emerged victorious in a sprint race. In 2020 and 2021, the Swede also competed in some FIS races. In March 2022, she won the silver medal at the national junior cross-country skiing championships, finishing only 1.5 seconds behind Märta Rosenberg.

=== Biathlon ===
The first international experiences for Sara Andersson were gained at the 2019 Youth World Championships. The following year, she exclusively participated in the Junior European Championships. The individual races at the Youth Olympic Games did not go satisfactorily for her; however, she won bronze in the Single Mixed Relay alongside Oscar Andersson. At the beginning of the 2020/21 season, at 18 years old, she made her debut in the IBU Cup and, in her second competition at Arber, finished sixth in the sprint. At the 2021 Youth World Championships, Andersson narrowly missed a medal in the individual and pursuit events, finishing ninth in the sprint. In the winter of 2021/22, Andersson consistently competed in the IBU Cup. She narrowly missed her first podium as she finished fourth in Sjusjøen, and in Osrblie, she secured a fifth-place finish. Her first podium came at the same venue in the pursuit, where she only had to concede to Yevgeniya Burtasova. The season ended remarkably well, with Andersson winning gold in the individual and bronze in the pursuit at the Youth World Championships. She continued her success at the Youth Olympic Festival, earning gold in the sprint and silver in the individual event.

The winter of 2022/23 was also successful for Andersson, with most of her competitions resulting in top-20 finishes. She reached the podium once with the mixed relay team, including Anton Ivarsson, Oskar Brandt, and Felicia Lindqvist. She was supposed to make her Biathlon World Cup debut in the individual event in Ruhpolding but did not participate. After the Biathlon Junior World Championships 2022, where she earned a bronze medal, Andersson finally made her World Cup debut at the season finale in Oslo. In the sprint, she hit all ten targets and immediately placed 31st, entering the points range.

== Biathlon results ==
All results are sourced from the International Biathlon Union.

=== Youth and Junior World Championships ===
6 medal (3 gold, 1 silver, 2 bronze)

| Year | Age | Individual | Sprint | Pursuit | Mass start 60 | Relay | Mixed relay |
|---|---|---|---|---|---|---|---|
| (Slovakia) 2019 Brezno-Osrblie | 16 (Youth) | 23rd | 65th | — | N/A | 16th | N/A |
| (Austria) 2021 Obertilliach | 18 (Youth) | 4th | 9th | 5th | N/A | 11th (Junior) | N/A |
| (United States) 2022 Soldier Hollow | 19 (Youth) | Gold | 8th | Bronze | N/A | 6th (Junior) | N/A |
| (Kazakhstan) 2023 Shchuchinsk | 20 (Junior) | 6th | Bronze | 8th | N/A | 6th | 5th |
| (Estonia) 2024 Otepää | 21 (Junior) | 15th | Gold | N/A | 4th | 14th | 9th |
| (Sweden) 2025 Östersund | 22 (Junior) | 13th | Silver | N/A | Gold | 7th | 7th |
