= Johan-Olav Botn =

Norwegian biathlete (born 1999)

Johan-Olav Smørdal Botn
- Botn in 2026

Personal information
- Born: 18 June 1999 (age 27) Stårheim, Norway
- Height: 1.76 m (5 ft 9 in)
- Weight: 69 kg (152 lb)

Sport
- Sport: Biathlon

Professional information
- Club: Stårheim IL
- World Cup debut: 5 January 2024

Olympic Games
- Teams: 1
- Medals: 2 (1 gold)

World Cup
- Seasons: 2
- Individual races: 28
- All races: 34
- Individual victories: 5
- All victories: 7
- Individual podiums: 8
- All podiums: 12
- Overall titles: 0
- Discipline titles: 0
Medal record
Men's biathlon
Representing Norway
Olympic Games
Gold medal – first place	2026 Milano Cortina	20 km individual
Silver medal – second place	2026 Milano Cortina	4 × 7.5 km relay
European Championships
Gold medal – first place	2024 Osrblie	Mixed relay
Silver medal – second place	2024 Osrblie	20 km individual
Silver medal – second place	2024 Osrblie	10 km sprint
- Updated on 22 March 2026

Johan-Olav Smørdal Botn (born 18 June 1999) is a Norwegian biathlete from the village Stårheim, in Stad Municipality. He made his Biathlon World Cup debut in 2024. He won gold in the men’s 20km individual biathlon at the 2026 Winter Olympics.

== Career ==
Botn made his international debut relatively late in November 2021, securing the 32nd position in the IBU Cup sprint in Idre. Following another appearance in January, he was subsequently excluded from the squad. During the winter of 2022–23, the Norwegian participated in the initial races in early December, achieving his first top-10 result with an 8th place in the individual competition. Due to Erlend Bjøntegaard's decision to waive his starting rights, Botn received the reserve starting position for the season finale in Canmore and secured podium finishes in both sprint races. His standout performance, however, occurred in the final race of the season, the pursuit competition, where he claimed his first IBU Cup victory with a lead of over a minute over Vebjørn Sørum. At the Norwegian Championships, Botn, alongside Håvard Bogetveit, Simon Kirkeeide, and Johannes Thingnes Bø, won the bronze medal in the relay event for Sogn og Fjordane. For the 2023–24 season, he was selected for the B-national team for the first time. At the 2024 European Biathlon Championship, he won one gold and two silver medals.

On 10 February 2026, Botn won the gold medal for men’s 20km individual biathlon at the 2026 Winter Olympics, finishing with a time of 51:31.5. On February 17, he won a silver medal in the relay, together with Martin Uldal, Sturla Holm Lægreid, and Vetle Sjåstad Christiansen.

== Personal life ==
Botn attended Eid High School in Nordfjordeid.

Botn is in a relationship with cross-country skier Karoline Simpson-Larsen. He is the son of Olav Botn and Brit Mari Smørdal Botn and has a brother called Jørn Smørdal Botn

== Biathlon results ==
All results are sourced from the International Biathlon Union.

=== Olympic Games ===
2 medals (1 gold, 1 silver)

Event	Individual	Sprint	Pursuit	Mass start	Relay	Mixed relay
(Italy) 2026 Milano Cortina	Gold	8	10	8	Silver	—

=== World Cup ===
Season	Age	Overall			Individual		Sprint		Pursuit		Mass start	
Season	Age	Races	Points	Position	Points	Position	Points	Position	Points	Position	Points	Position
2023–24	24	7/25	231	29th	–	–	210	21st	84	25th	27	31st
2025–26	26	17/21	968	3rd	141	2nd	290	6th	301	6th	236	2nd

==== Individual podiums ====
- 5 victories – (2 Ind, 1 Sp, 1 Pu, 1 MS)
- 8 podiums

No.	Season	Date	Location	Discipline	Level	Place
1	2023–24	9 March 2024	(United States) Soldier Hollow	10 km Sprint	World Cup	3rd
2	2025–26	3 December 2025	(Sweden) Östersund	20 km Individual	World Cup	1st
3	2025–26	6 December 2025	(Sweden) Östersund	10 km Sprint	World Cup	1st
4	2025–26	7 December 2025	(Sweden) Östersund	12.5 km Pursuit	World Cup	3rd
5	2025–26	13 December 2025	(Austria) Hochfilzen	12.5 km Pursuit	World Cup	3rd
6	2025–26	20 December 2025	(France) Annecy–Le Grand-Bornand	12.5 km Pursuit	World Cup	1st
7	2025–26	10 February 2026	(Italy) Antholz-Anterselva	20 km Individual	Olympic Games	1st
8	2025–26	22 March 2026	(Norway) Oslo	15 km Mass Start	World Cup	1st

==== Team podiums ====
- 2 victories – (2 Relay)
- 4 podiums

No.	Season	Date	Location	Discipline	Level	Place	Teammates
1	2025–26	30 November 2025	(Sweden) Östersund	Mixed Relay	World Cup	3rd	Strømsheim, Botn, Knotten, Tandrevold
2	2025–26	14 December 2025	(Austria) Hochfilzen	Relay	World Cup	1st	Dale-Skjevdal, Botn, Lægreid, Christiansen
3	2025–26	17 February 2026	(Italy) Antholz-Anterselva	Relay	Olympic Games	2nd	Uldal, Botn, Lægreid, Christiansen
4	2025–26	7 March 2026	(Finland) Lahti	Relay	World Cup	1st	Dale-Skjevdal, Botn, Lægreid, Christiansen

=== IBU Cup ===
Season	Age	Overall			Individual		Super Sprint		Sprint		Pursuit		Mass start	
Season	Age	Races	Points	Position	Points	Position	Points	Position	Points	Position	Points	Position	Points	Position
2021–22	22	3/22	11	143rd	2	79th	–	–	9	131st	–	–	–	–
2022–23	23	7/22	355	14th	34	26th	28	19th	163	17th	90	13rd	40	13rd
2023–24	24	15/23	1135	2nd	165	4th	n/h	n/h	660	1st	210	4th	100	6th
2024–25	25	18/24	1144	3rd	180	3rd	n/h	n/h	468	4th	281	3rd	215	1st

==== Individual podiums ====
- 11 victories – (1 Ind, 5 Sp, 4 Pu, 1 MS)
- 26 podiums

No.	Season	Date	Location	Level	Race	Place
1	2022–23	25 February 2023	(Canada) Canmore	IBU Cup	Sprint	3rd
2	2022–23	1 March 2023	(Canada) Canmore	IBU Cup	Sprint	2nd
3	2022–23	3 March 2023	(Canada) Canmore	IBU Cup	Pursuit	1st
4	2023–24	30 November 2023	(Finland) Kontiolahti	IBU Cup	Individual	1st
5	2023–24	2 December 2023	(Finland) Kontiolahti	IBU Cup	Sprint	1st
6	2023–24	8 December 2023	(Sweden) Idre Fjäll	IBU Cup	Sprint	1st
7	2023–24	9 December 2023	(Sweden) Idre Fjäll	IBU Cup	Sprint	2nd
8	2023–24	10 December 2023	(Sweden) Idre Fjäll	IBU Cup	Pursuit	1st
9	2023–24	13 December 2023	(Norway) Sjusjøen	IBU Cup	Sprint	2nd
10	2023–24	15 December 2023	(Norway) Sjusjøen	IBU Cup	Pursuit	1st
11	2023–24	16 December 2023	(Norway) Sjusjøen	IBU Cup	Mass Start 60	3rd
12	2023–24	10 January 2024	(Italy) Ridnaun-Val Ridanna	IBU Cup	Sprint	1st
13	2023–24	24 January 2024	(Slovakia) Brezno-Osrblie	European Championships	Individual	2nd
14	2023–24	26 January 2024	(Slovakia) Brezno-Osrblie	European Championships	Sprint	2nd
15	2023–24	1 February 2024	(Germany) Arber	IBU Cup	Sprint	2nd
16	2023–24	3 February 2024	(Germany) Arber	IBU Cup	Sprint	1st
17	2024–25	30 November 2024	(Sweden) Idre Fjäll	IBU Cup	Sprint	2nd
18	2024–25	1 December 2024	(Sweden) Idre Fjäll	IBU Cup	Pursuit	2nd
19	2024–25	4 December 2024	(Norway) Geilo	IBU Cup	Individual	2nd
20	2024–25	6 December 2024	(Norway) Geilo	IBU Cup	Sprint	2nd
21	2024–25	7 December 2024	(Norway) Geilo	IBU Cup	Pursuit	2nd
22	2024–25	19 December 2024	(Austria) Obertilliach	IBU Cup	Sprint	2nd
23	2024–25	21 December 2024	(Austria) Obertilliach	IBU Cup	Mass Start 60	1st
24	2024–25	8 March 2025	(Estonia) Otepää	IBU Cup	Pursuit	1st
25	2024–25	9 March 2025	(Estonia) Otepää	IBU Cup	Mass Start 60	2nd
26	2024–25	14 March 2025	(Estonia) Otepää	IBU Cup	Sprint	1st
