= Maren Kirkeeide =

Norwegian biathlete (born 2003)

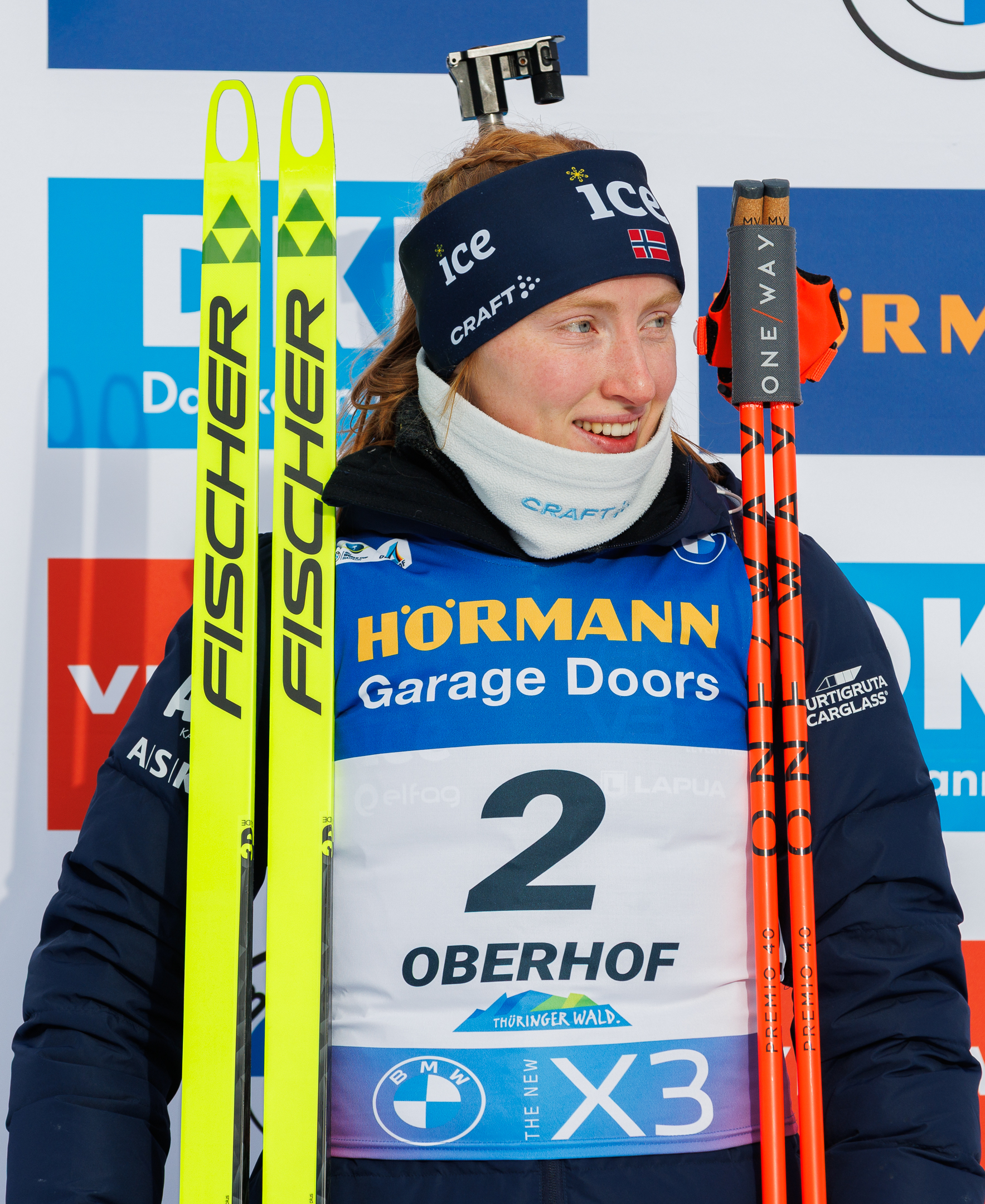
- Kirkeeide in 2025

Personal information
- Full name: Maren Hjelmeset Kirkeeide
- Born: 1 March 2003 (age 23) Stryn, Norway
- Height: 175 cm (5 ft 9 in)

Sport
- Country: Norway
- Sport: Biathlon
- Coached by: Patrick Oberegger; Sverre Huber Kaas

Professional information
- Club: Markane IL
- World Cup debut: 2023

Olympic Games
- Teams: 1 2026
- Medals: 3 (1 gold)

World Championships
- Teams: 1 2025
- Medals: 2 (0 gold)

World Cup
- Seasons: 4 (2022/23–)
- Individual races: 58
- All races: 76
- Individual victories: 2
- All victories: 3
- Individual podiums: 8
- All podiums: 21
- Overall titles: 1 (2025–26 Under 23)
- Discipline titles: 0
Medal record
Women's biathlon
Representing Norway
Olympic Games
Gold medal – first place	2026 Milano Cortina	7.5 km sprint
Silver medal – second place	2026 Milano Cortina	10 km pursuit
Bronze medal – third place	2026 Milano Cortina	4 × 6 km relay
World Championships
Silver medal – second place	2025 Lenzerheide	4 × 6 km relay
Bronze medal – third place	2025 Lenzerheide	12.5 km mass start
European Championships
Gold medal – first place	2023 Lenzerheide	Mixed relay
Gold medal – first place	2024 Osrblie	15 km individual
Gold medal – first place	2024 Osrblie	10 km pursuit
Gold medal – first place	2024 Osrblie	Mixed relay
Silver medal – second place	2024 Osrblie	7.5 km sprint
Youth World Championships
Gold medal – first place	2022 Soldier Hollow	6 km sprint
- Updated on 22 March 2026

Maren Hjelmeset Kirkeeide (born 1 March 2003) is a Norwegian biathlete. She has competed in the Biathlon World Cup since 2023. She won gold medal in the individual race at the 2024 IBU Open European Championships.

== Career ==
Maren Kirkeeide participated in her initial international biathlon competitions during the junior competitions of the Biathlon Junior World Championships 2022 in Soldier Hollow. She secured victory in the sprint race and subsequently participated in the junior women's relay, finishing fourth with a notable gap of over three minutes behind the winning Italian team. Kirkeeide drew attention during the preparatory races in Sjusjøen in mid-November 2022. Despite the absence of top Norwegian biathletes, she failed to achieve a podium finish but recorded the fastest time in the second sprint and secured a fourth-place finish despite two shooting misses.

Following this, at the age of 19, Kirkeeide made her debut in the IBU Cup in Idre, immediately clinching the second position in the individual competition. Two weeks later, she achieved her inaugural victory at the pursuit in Ridnaun, surpassing Federica Sanfilippo in a final sprint. She also achieved success in Osrblie by winning the super sprint and triumphing with the mixed relay. Subsequently, Kirkeeide had the opportunity to compete in an individual World Cup race in Ruhpolding, finishing 50th after three misses at the end of January 2023.

She participated in her first IBU Open European Championships in late January 2023, where, despite not securing a top-10 placement in individual races, she won the gold medal in the mixed relay alongside Karoline Erdal, Erlend Bjøntegaard, and Vebjørn Sørum. In the final competitions in Canmore, Kirkeeide secured two more victories in the sprint and mixed relay, earning her a spot at the World Cup Final in Oslo. She finished 25th in the sprint with one shooting miss. In the 2022–23 Biathlon IBU Cup overall standings, she claimed fourth place and won the super sprint classification.

== Personal life ==
Kirkeeide is the niece of former cross-country skier Odd-Bjørn Hjelmeset.

== Biathlon results ==
All results are sourced from the International Biathlon Union.

=== Olympic Games ===
3 medals (1 gold, 1 silver, 1 bronze)

Event	Individual	Sprint	Pursuit	Mass start	Relay	Mixed relay
(Italy) 2026 Milano Cortina	49th	Gold	Silver	12th	Bronze	4th

=== World Championships ===
2 medals (1 silver, 1 bronze)

Event	Individual	Sprint	Pursuit	Mass start	Relay	Mixed relay	Single mixed relay
(Switzerland) 2025 Lenzerheide	8th	16th	33rd	Bronze	Silver	4th	—

=== Youth and Junior World Championships ===
1 medal (1 gold)

Year	Age	Individual	Sprint	Pursuit	Relay
(United States) 2022 Soldier Hollow	18	17th	Gold	5th	4th

=== World Cup ===
Season	Age	Overall			Individual		Sprint		Pursuit		Mass start	
Season	Age	Races	Points	Position	Points	Position	Points	Position	Points	Position	Points	Position
2022–23	20	2/20	16	74th	—	—	16	64th	—	—	—	—
2023–24	21	9/21	66	54th	29	37th	12	68th	11	65th	14	39th
2024–25	22	20/21	548	10th	41	28th	204	8th	214	7th	89	19th
2025–26	23	19/21	639	9th	29	35th	240	8th	244	8th	126	9th

==== Individual podiums ====
- 2 victories (1 Sp, 1 MS)
- 8 podiums

No.	Season	Date	Location	Level	Race	Place
1	2024–25	9 January 2025	(Germany) Oberhof	World Cup	Sprint	2nd
2	2024–25	11 January 2025	(Germany) Oberhof	World Cup	Pursuit	2nd
3	2024–25	23 February 2025	(Switzerland) Lenzerheide	World Championships	Mass Start	3rd
4	2025–26	12 December 2025	(Austria) Hochfilzen	World Cup	Sprint	2nd
5	2025–26	14 December 2025	(Austria) Hochfilzen	World Cup	Pursuit	3rd
6	2025–26	21 December 2025	(France) Le Grand-Bornand	World Cup	Mass Start	1st
7	2025–26	14 February 2026	(Italy) Antholz-Anterselva	Olympic Games	Sprint	1st
8	2025–26	15 February 2026	(Italy) Antholz-Anterselva	Olympic Games	Pursuit	2nd

==== Relay podiums ====
- 1 victories (1 Relay)
- 13 podiums

No.	Season	Date	Location	Level	Race	Placement	Teammate
1	2024–25	1 December 2024	(Finland) Kontiolahti	World Cup	Relay	3rd	Arnekleiv, Knotten, Tandrevold
2	2024–25	12 January 2025	(Germany) Oberhof	World Cup	Mixed Relay	3rd	Lægreid, Boe, Tandrevold
3	2024–25	18 January 2025	(Germany) Ruhpolding	World Cup	Relay	2nd	Knotten, Arnekleiv, Femsteinevik
4	2024–25	26 January 2025	(Italy) Antholz-Anterselva	World Cup	Relay	2nd	Knotten, Femsteinevik, Tandrevold
5	2024–25	22 February 2025	(Switzerland) Lenzerheide	World Championships	Relay	2nd	Knotten, Tandrevold, Femsteinevik
6	2024–25	9 March 2025	(Czech Republic) Nové Město na Moravě	World Cup	Relay	2nd	Knotten, Tandrevold, Femsteinevik
7	2024–25	16 March 2025	(Slovenia) Pokljuka	World Cup	Mixed Relay	3rd	Lien, Dale-Skjevdal, Frey
8	2025–26	30 November 2025	(Sweden) Östersund	World Cup	Single Mixed Relay	2nd	Lægreid
9	2025–26	13 December 2025	(Austria) Hochfilzen	World Cup	Relay	2nd	Johansen, Tandrevold, Knotten
10	2025–26	10 January 2026	(Germany) Oberhof	World Cup	Relay	2nd	Johansen, Tandrevold, Knotten
11	2025–26	14 January 2026	(Germany) Ruhpolding	World Cup	Relay	1st	Johansen, Arnekleiv, Knotten
12	2025–26	18 February 2026	(Italy) Antholz-Anterselva	Olympic Games	Relay	3rd	Johansen, Arnekleiv, Knotten
13	2025–26	8 March 2026	(Finland) Kontiolahti	World Cup	Relay	3rd	Johansen, Tandrevold, Knotten
