= 2024 IBU Open European Championships =

Biathlon competition in Osrblie, Slovakia

- Venue: Národné biatlonové centrum v Osrblí
- Location: Osrblie, Slovakia
- Dates: 24–28 January

The 2024 IBU Open European Championships were held from 24 to 28 January 2024 in Osrblie, Slovakia.

== Schedule ==
All times are local (UTC+1).

Date	Time	Event
24 January	10:30	Men's 20 km individual
24 January	14:30	Women's 15 km individual
26 January	11:00	Men's 10 km sprint
26 January	14:30	Women's 7.5 km sprint
27 January	11:00	Men's 12.5 km pursuit
27 January	14:00	Women's 10 km pursuit
28 January	11:45	4 × 6 km W+M mixed relay
28 January	14:00	6 km W + 7.5 km M single mixed relay

== Results ==
=== Men's ===
Event	Gold		Silver		Bronze	
20 km individual details	Vebjørn Sørum; Norway	51:32.7 (0+0+0+0)	Johan-Olav Botn; Norway	52:42.4 (2+0+0+0)	Martin Uldal; Norway	53:17.6 (0+0+0+1)
10 km sprint details	Antonin Guigonnat; France	22:51.9 (0+0)	Johan-Olav Botn; Norway	23:06.4 (1+1)	Isak Frey; Norway	23:08.6 (1+0)
12.5 km pursuit details	Isak Frey; Norway	32:42.1 (1+0+0+2)	Dmitrii Shamaev; Romania	32:54.4 (0+0+0+0)	Antonin Guigonnat; France	33:08.1 (1+0+4+0)

=== Women's ===
Event	Gold		Silver		Bronze	
15 km individual details	Maren Kirkeeide; Norway	41:26.2 (0+0+0+0)	Alina Stremous; Moldova	42:12.7 (0+1+0+0)	Ema Kapustová; Slovakia	42:25.3 (0+0+0+0)
7.5 km sprint details	Ida Lien; Norway	19:11.5 (0+0)	Maren Kirkeeide; Norway	19:25.5 (0+0)	Khrystyna Dmytrenko; Ukraine	19:46.8 (0+0)
10 km pursuit details	Maren Kirkeeide; Norway	29:49.9 (1+0+0+1)	Emilie Kalkenberg; Norway	30:01.0 (1+0+0+1)	Océane Michelon; France	30:17.0 (0+1+0+1)

=== Mixed ===
Event	Gold		Silver		Bronze	
6 km M + 7.5 km W single relay details	Sweden Anton Ivarsson; Sara Andersson	41:50.1 (0+1) (0+2) (0+1) (0+0) (0+0) (0+0) (0+0) (0+2)	Norway Vebjørn Sørum; Emilie Kalkenberg	42:04.0 (0+2) (0+1) (0+1) (0+2) (0+1) (0+3) (0+1) (1+3)	Austria Patrick Jakob; Kristina Oberthaler	42:34.0 (0+0) (0+2) (0+0) (0+2) (0+0) (0+3) (0+0) (0+2)
4 × 6 km M+W relay details	Norway Isak Frey; Johan-Olav Botn; Ida Lien; Maren Kirkeeide	1:04:23.3 (0+0) (0+0) (0+0) (1+3) (0+0) (0+0) (0+1) (0+3)	France Théo Guiraud-Poillot; Antonin Guigonnat; Océane Michelon; Camille Bened	1:04:37.9 (1+3) (0+0) (0+1) (0+0) (0+1) (0+1) (0+0) (0+1)	Italy Nicola Romanin; Nicolò Betemps; Beatrice Trabucchi; Hannah Auchentaller	1:05:17.1 (0+0) (0+0) (0+0) (0+1) (0+1) (0+0) (0+2) (0+1)

== Medal table ==
* Host nation (Slovakia)

Rank	Nation	Gold	Silver	Bronze	Total
1	Norway	6	5	2	13
2	France	1	1	2	4
3	Sweden	1	0	0	1
4	Moldova	0	1	0	1
4	Romania	0	1	0	1
6	Austria	0	0	1	1
6	Italy	0	0	1	1
6	Slovakia*	0	0	1	1
6	Ukraine	0	0	1	1
Totals (9 entries)		8	8	8	24
