= Ella Halvarsson =

Swedish biathlete (born 1999)

Personal information
- Nationality: Swedish
- Born: 22 October 1999 (age 26) Borlänge, Sweden
- Height: 174 cm (5 ft 9 in)

Sport
- Country: Sweden
- Sport: Biathlon
Medal record
Women's biathlon
Representing Sweden
World Championships
| Silver medal – second place | 2025 Lenzerheide | 15 km individual |
| Bronze medal – third place | 2025 Lenzerheide | 4 × 6 km relay |
Youth World Championships
| Gold medal – first place | 2018 Otepää | 3 × 6 km relay |

Ella Karin Anna Halvarsson (born 22 October 1999) is a Swedish biathlete who has competed in the Biathlon World Cup since 2023.

== Career ==
Halvarsson gained her first international experience in biathlon at the 2018 Youth World Championships, where she immediately won the gold medal in the relay alongside Amanda Lundström and Elvira Öberg. Öberg secured victory in a photo finish against Finland's Heidi Nikkinen in the final sprint. In 2020, Halvarsson competed again at the Junior World Championships and also won a super sprint qualification in the IBU Junior Cup, though she fell back to 18th place in the competition.

In the 2020/21 winter season, Halvarsson started competing in the IBU Cup. In January, at Arber, she achieved an eighth and a fifth place in the sprint, and alongside Gabriel Stegmayr, another fifth place in the mixed relay. The European Championships were also highly successful, with a sixth-place finish in the individual event, and by the end of the season, she had recorded two more top-10 results in sprint and relay events.

In the following season, Halvarsson was unable to achieve a top-10 finish but consistently ranked in the top 20, with only a few exceptions. During the 2022/23 season, she competed in all stages of the IBU Cup, achieving top-10 results in Pokljuka, Osrblie, and Obertilliach. Her best performance came in the final race of the season in Canmore, where she hit all her targets in the pursuit, recovered nearly two minutes and climbed 17 places to secure her first podium finish at the senior level.

When Stina Nilsson withdrew due to illness, Halvarsson had the chance to compete at her home World Cup in Östersund. There, she hit 19 out of 20 targets in the individual race and finished 33rd, earning World Cup points in her debut race.

In the 2024/25 season, after making it to the main team for the World Cup stage in Kontiolahti, she achieved her first podium and her first victory in the World Cup in the single mixed relay alongside Sebastian Samuelsson. At her debut World Championship in 2025 in Lenzerheide, she won silver in the individual race and bronze in the women's relay.

== Biathlon results ==
All results are sourced from the International Biathlon Union.

=== World Championships ===
2 medals (1 silver, 1 bronze)

| Event | Individual | Sprint | Pursuit | Mass start | Relay | Mixed relay | Single mixed relay |
|---|---|---|---|---|---|---|---|
| (Switzerland) 2025 Lenzerheide | Silver | 9th | 9th | 17th | Bronze | — | 5th |

=== World Cup ===
| Season | Age | Overall | | | Individual | | Sprint | | Pursuit | | Mass start | |
| Season | Age | Races | Points | Position | Points | Position | Points | Position | Points | Position | Points | Position |
|---|---|---|---|---|---|---|---|---|---|---|---|---|
| 2022–23 | 23 | 2/20 | 8 | 81st | 8 | 59th | — | — | — | — | — | — |
| 2024–25 | 25 | 17/21 | 367 | 18th | 109 | 6th | 78 | 35th | 98 | 25th | 82 | 22nd |
| 2025–26 | 26 | 15/21 | 252 | 27th | 5 | 71st | 106 | 22nd | 87 | 28th | 54 | 26th |

==== Individual podiums ====
- 2 podiums

| No. | Season | Date | Location | Level | Race | Place |
|---|---|---|---|---|---|---|
| 1 | 2024–25 | 4 December 2024 | (Finland) Kontiolahti | World Cup | Short Individual | 2nd |
| 2 | 2024–25 | 18 February 2025 | (Switzerland) Lenzerheide | World Championships | Individual | 2nd |

==== Relay podiums ====
| No. | Season | Date | Location | Level | Race | Place | Teammate |
|---|---|---|---|---|---|---|---|
| 1 | 2024–25 | 30 November 2024 | (Finland) Kontiolahti | World Cup | Single Mixed Relay | 1st | Sebastian Samuelsson |
| 2 | 2024–25 | 15 December 2024 | (Austria) Hochfilzen | World Cup | Relay | 3rd | Magnusson, Heijdenberg, E. Öberg |
| 3 | 2024–25 | 26 January 2025 | (Italy) Antholz-Anterselva | World Cup | Relay | 1st | Skottheim, Magnusson, H. Öberg |
| 4 | 2024–25 | 22 February 2025 | (Switzerland) Lenzerheide | World Championships | Relay | 3rd | Magnusson, H. Öberg, E. Öberg |
| 5 | 2025–26 | 30 November 2025 | (Sweden) Östersund | World Cup | Single Mixed Relay | 1st | Sebastian Samuelsson |
| 6 | 2025–26 | 13 December 2025 | (Austria) Hochfilzen | World Cup | Relay | 1st | Magnusson, E. Öberg, H. Öberg |

=== Youth and Junior World Championships ===
1 medal (1 gold)

| Year | Age | Individual | Sprint | Pursuit | Relay |
|---|---|---|---|---|---|
| (Estonia) 2018 Otepää | 18 | 16th | 75th | — | Gold |
| (Switzerland) 2020 Lenzerheide | 20 | 35th | 19th | 8th | 11th |
| (Austria) 2021 Obertilliach | 21 | 15th | 13th | 5th | 11th |
