= Isak Frey =

Norwegian biathlete (born 2003)

- Frey at the Loop One Biathlon Opening Festival 2026

Personal information
- Full name: Isak Leknes Frey
- Born: 28 August 2003 (age 23) Bærum, Norway

Sport
- Country: Norway
- Sport: Biathlon
Medal record
Men's biathlon
Representing Norway
European Championships
Gold medal – first place	2024 Osrblie	12.5 km pursuit
Gold medal – first place	2024 Osrblie	Mixed relay
Gold medal – first place	2025 Val Martello	20 km individual
Gold medal – first place	2025 Val Martello	4 × 7.5 km relay
Gold medal – first place	2026 Sjusjøen	12.5 km pursuit
Silver medal – second place	2025 Val Martello	12.5 km pursuit
Silver medal – second place	2026 Sjusjøen	20 km individual
Silver medal – second place	2026 Sjusjøen	10 km sprint
Bronze medal – third place	2024 Osrblie	10 km sprint
Junior World Championships
Gold medal – first place	2023 Shchuchinsk	4 × 7.5 km relay
Gold medal – first place	2024 Otepää	10 km sprint
Gold medal – first place	2024 Otepää	4 × 6 km mixed relay
Gold medal – first place	2024 Otepää	4 × 7.5 km relay
Silver medal – second place	2024 Otepää	12 km mass start 60
Bronze medal – third place	2023 Shchuchinsk	15 km individual
Bronze medal – third place	2023 Shchuchinsk	4 × 6 km mixed relay
Youth World Championships
Gold medal – first place	2022 Soldier Hollow	3 × 7.5 km relay

Isak Leknes Frey (born 28 August 2003) is a Norwegian biathlete.

== Career ==
Isak Frey gained his initial international exposure in January 2020 as a member of the Norwegian team at the Youth Olympic Games. However, despite his participation, he did not secure a medal due to several shooting misses. After a hiatus from international competitions, he made his debut in 2022 at the Youth World Championships in Soldier Hollow, Utah, where he, along with Stian Fedreheim and Andreas Aas, emerged victorious in the relay event. Furthermore, Frey claimed the title of Norwegian champion in the sprint in the junior category.

In January 2023, at the age of 19, Isak Frey made his debut in the IBU Cup in Osrblie, showcasing immediate success. In the sprint, he secured the second position behind Éric Perrot. Additionally, in the mixed relay, Frey, partnering with Endre Strømsheim, Juni Arnekleiv, and Maren Kirkeeide, secured victory after leading the team as the starting athlete. In March of the same year, Frey participated in the Junior World Championships, clinching bronze in both the mixed relay and individual events. He also contributed to a relay victory, this time alongside Trym Gerhardsen, Einar Hedegart, and Martin Nevland. Representing Oslo og Akershus, he, along with Strømsheim, Johannes Dale-Skjevdal, and Sturla Holm Lægreid, became the Norwegian champion in the men's relay. At the 2024 European Biathlon Championship, he won 2 gold and one bronze medal.

== Biathlon results ==
All results are sourced from the International Biathlon Union.

=== World Cup ===
==== Individual podiums ====
- 1 podium

No.	Season	Date	Location	Level	Race	Place
1	2025–26	17 January 2026	(Germany) Ruhpolding	World Cup	Sprint	3rd

=== Youth and Junior World Championships ===
5 medals (4 gold, 1 bronze)

Year	Age	Individual	Sprint	Pursuit	Relay
(United States) 2022 Soldier Hollow	18	15th	10th	7th	Gold
(Kazakhstan) 2023 Shchuchinsk	19	Bronze	10th	10th	Gold
(Estonia) 2024 Otepää	20	4th	Gold	N/A	Gold
