= Sjusjøen =

Ski resort in Ringsaker, Norway

Coordinates: 61°9′18″N 10°41′54″E

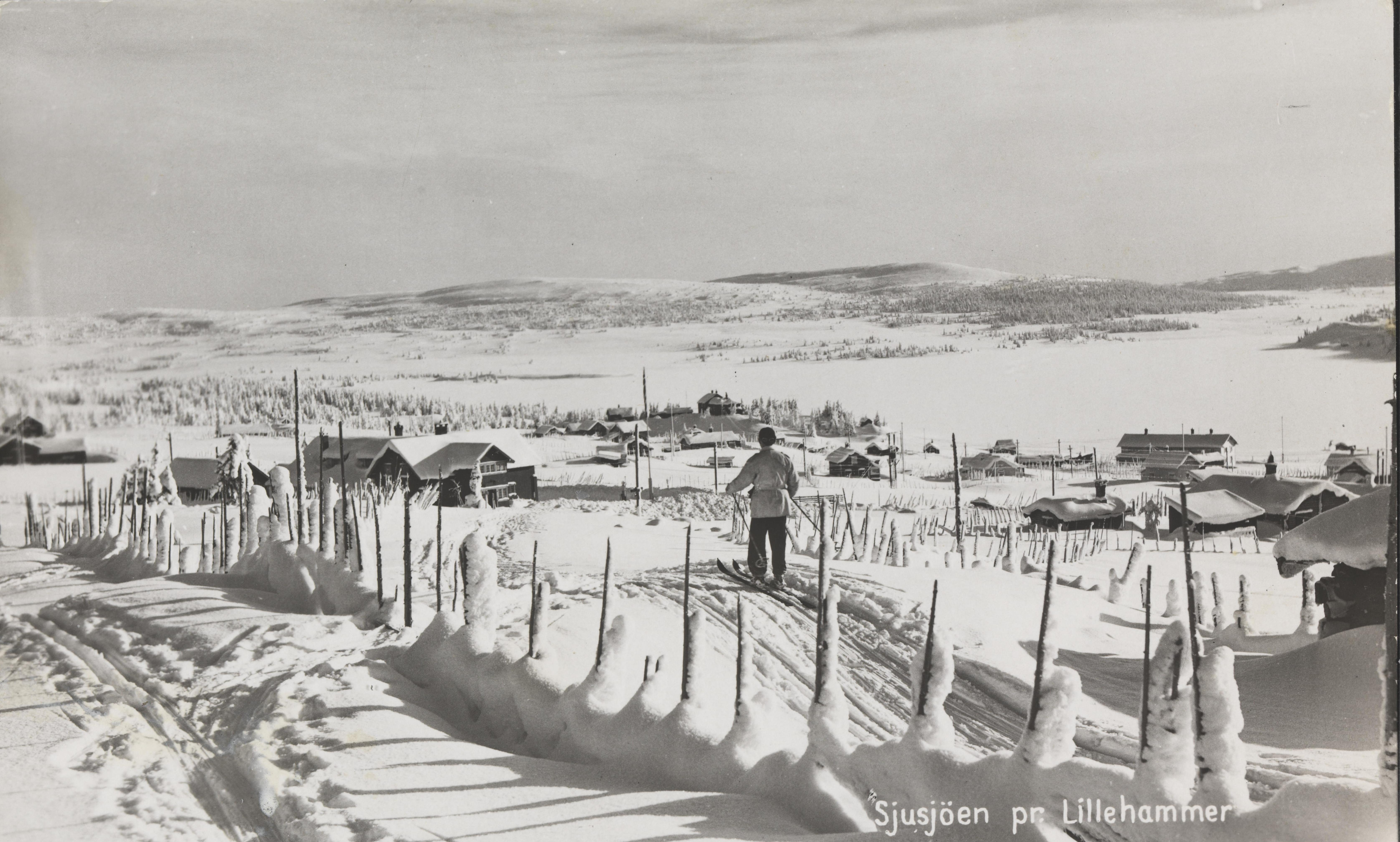
Winter in Sjusjøen

Sjusjøen is a cross country skiing destination in Ringsaker Municipality in Innlandet county, Norway. Situated on the mountain plateau south of Sjusjøen is Hedmarksvidda. The area is located with forest and mountain terrain about 750–1,000 metres (2,460–3,280 ft) above sea level. This area is located about 20 kilometres (12 mi) east of the town of Lillehammer.

The area is the site of many holiday cottages, a hotel, and a youth hostel for accommodation. Sjusjøen and neighboring village of Nordseter (to the west) were both originally mountain farm communities, which - with their easily accessible forest and mountain terrain - have developed into skiing destinations.

The area offers a wide range of skiing alternatives, including on approximately 350 kilometres (220 mi) of prepared cross-country trails. The tracks run all the way to Lillehammer Municipality and Øyer Municipality and they also connect with the Olympic tracks at the Birkebeineren Ski Stadium. The trails go through forested and mountain terrain, and are clearly marked with signposts.

Sjusjøen is also the name of a lake, centrally located in the area. The area also comprises the largest concentration of recreational homes in Norway.
