= 2023–24 Biathlon World Cup – Stage 1 =

2023–24 Biathlon World Cup Stage

The 2023–24 Biathlon World Cup – Stage 1 was the first event of the season and was held in Östersund, Sweden, from 25 November to 3 December 2023. The event consisted of three individual competitions and two relay races for both genders and two mixed relays. World cup leaders after the events in Östersund were Philipp Nawrath for men and Franziska Preuß for the women.

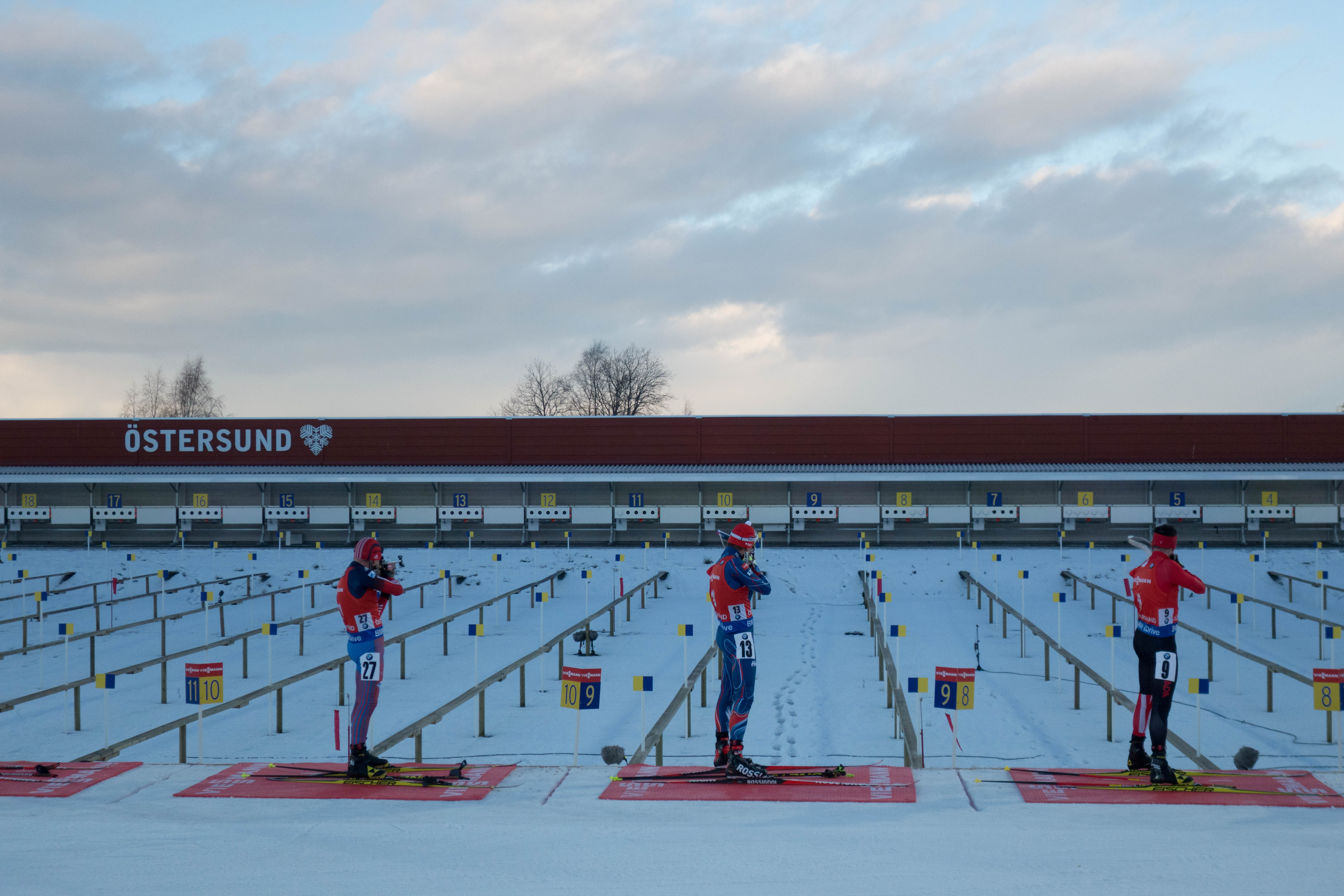
Östersund in 2015

== Schedule of events ==
The events took place at the following times.

Date	Time	Events
25 November	14:30 EET	Single Mixed Relay
25 November	16:50 EET	Mixed Relay
26 November	13:20 EET	Women's 15 km Individual
26 November	16:30 EET	Men's 20 km Individual
29 November	17:20 EET	Women's 4x6km Relay
30 November	17:20 EET	Men's 4x7.5km Relay
1 December	16:45 EET	Women's 7.5 km Sprint
2 December	16:45 EET	Men's 10 km Sprint
3 December	16:00 EET	Women's 10 km Pursuit
3 December	18:00 EET	Men's 12.5 km Pursuit

== Medal winners ==
=== Men ===
Event:	Gold:	Time	Silver:	Time	Bronze:	Time
20 km Individual	Roman Rees; Germany	51:27.2 (0+0+0+1)	Justus Strelow; Germany	51:39.3 (0+1+0+0)	Johannes Thingnes Bø; Norway	51:52.2 (1+0+0+1)
10 km Sprint	Philipp Nawrath; Germany	24:02.0 (0+0)	Tarjei Bø; Norway	24:20.7 (0+0)	Vebjørn Sørum; Norway	24:21.8 (0+0)
12.5 km Pursuit	Sebastian Samuelsson; Sweden	31:38.4 (1+1+0+1)	Philipp Nawrath; Germany	+5.1 (0+0+1+1)	Vetle Sjåstad Christiansen; Norway	+7.2 (0+0+1+0)
4 x 7.5 km Men Relay	Norway; Endre Strømsheim; Tarjei Bø; Johannes Thingnes Bø; Vetle Sjåstad Christiansen	1:14:28.4 (0+1) (0+2) (0+1) (0+1) (0+1) (0+0) (0+0) (0+1)	France; Éric Perrot; Émilien Jacquelin; Fabien Claude; Quentin Fillon Maillet	1:14:49.9 (0+1) (0+1) (0+1) (0+2) (0+2) (0+1) (0+3) (0+0)	Germany; David Zobel; Philipp Nawrath; Benedikt Doll; Johannes Kühn	1:15:18.9 (0+3) (0+1) (0+1) (0+1) (0+2) (0+3) (0+2) (1+3)

=== Women ===
Event:	Gold:	Time	Silver:	Time	Bronze:	Time
15 km Individual	Lisa Vittozzi; Italy	44:03.9 (0+0+1+0)	Franziska Preuß; Germany	44:04.0 (0+0+0+0)	Vanessa Voigt; Germany	44:14.0 (0+0+0+0)
7.5 km Sprint	Lou Jeanmonnot; France	21:04.1 (0+0)	Karoline Offigstad Knotten; Norway	21:12.6 (1+0)	Juni Arnekleiv; Norway	21:21.7 (0+1)
10 km Pursuit	Lou Jeanmonnot; France	31:41.3 (0+0+0+0)	Franziska Preuß; Germany	+0.3 (0+0+1+0)	Vanessa Voigt; Germany	+18.5 (0+0+0+1)
4 x 5 km Women Relay	Norway; Marthe Kråkstad Johansen; Juni Arnekleiv; Karoline Offigstad Knotten; Ingrid Landmark Tandrevold	1:18:48.3 (0+0) (0+0) (0+2) (0+0) (0+2) (0+3) (0+0) (0+2)	Sweden; Anna Magnusson; Linn Persson; Elvira Öberg; Hanna Öberg	1:19:29.9 (0+0) (0+3) (0+0) (0+1) (0+0) (0+0) (0+2) (1+3)	Germany; Janina Hettich-Walz; Selina Grotian; Vanessa Voigt; Franziska Preuß	1:19:36.2 (0+0) (0+1) (0+1) (0+1) (0+0) (0+0) (0+0) (0+1)

=== Mixed ===
Event:	Gold:	Time	Silver:	Time	Bronze:	Time
Single Mixed Relay	Sweden; Sebastian Samuelsson; Hanna Öberg	37:46.9 (0+1) (0+3) (0+0) (0+0) (0+0) (0+0) (0+2) (0+2)	Norway; Sturla Holm Lægreid; Juni Arnekleiv	38:00.7 (0+0) (0+1) (0+2) (0+0) (0+1) (0+0) (0+0) (0+2)	France; Fabien Claude; Julia Simon	38:29.1 (0+1) (0+2) (0+0) (0+2) (1+3) (1+3) (0+0) (0+1)
Mixed Relay	France; Quentin Fillon Maillet; Émilien Jacquelin; Justine Braisaz-Bouchet; Lou Jeanmonnot	1:09:09.9 (0+2) (0+0) (0+0) (1+3) (0+0) (0+0) (0+0) (0+0)	Norway; Tarjei Bø; Johannes Thingnes Bø; Karoline Offigstad Knotten; Ingrid Landmark Tandrevold	1:09:25.6 (0+0) (0+1) (0+2) (0+0) (0+0) (0+3) (0+0) (0+1)	Italy; Didier Bionaz; Tommaso Giacomel; Dorothea Wierer; Lisa Vittozzi	1:09:49.6 (0+2) (0+0) (0+2) (1+3) (0+0) (0+1) (0+1) (0+0)

== Achievements ==
Best individual performance for all time

Men
Place	Name	Race
1	(Germany) Roman Rees	Individual
1	(Germany) Philipp Nawrath	Sprint
2	(Germany) Justus Strelow	Individual
3	(Norway) Vebjoern Soerum	Sprint
16	(Romania) George Coltea	Individual
18	(Moldova) Pavel Magazeev	Individual
26	(Kazakhstan) Alexandr Mukhin	Pursuit
28	(Czech Republic) Jonas Marecek	Individual
32	(Moldova) Maksim Makarov	Sprint
33	(Austria) Magnus Oberhauser	Pursuit
37	(Poland) Jan Gunka	Sprint
62	(Switzerland) Dajan Danuser	Sprint
69	(Sweden) Anton Ivarsson	Sprint
73	(Slovenia) Matic Repnik	Sprint
79	(Bulgaria) Konstantin Vasilev	Individual
80	(Switzerland) Gion Stalder	Individual
82	(Belgium) Marek Mackels	Individual
84	(Poland) Konrad Badacz	Sprint
85	(Greenland) Sondre Slettemark	Sprint
86	(Estonia) Marten Aolaid	Individual
97	(Greece) Nikolaos Tsourekas	Sprint
Debut
73	(Slovenia) Matic Repnik	Sprint
82	(Belgium) Marek Mackels	Individual
83	(Sweden) Anton Ivarsson	Individual
96	(Greenland) Sondre Slettemark	Individual
97	(Poland) Konrad Badacz	Individual

Women
Place	Name	Race
1	(France) Lou Jeanmonnot	Sprint
2	(Norway) Karoline Offigstad Knotten	Sprint
3	(Norway) Juni Arnekleiv	Sprint
7	(Norway) Marthe Krakstad Johansen	Sprint
8	(France) Gilonne Guigonnat	Sprint
9	(Poland) Anna Maka	Individual
10	(Norway) Marit Ishol Skogan	Individual
11	(Poland) Joanna Jakiela	Individual
13	(Austria) Tamara Steiner	Individual
18	(Estonia) Susan Kuelm	Individual
21	(Germany) Selina Grotian	Sprint
26	(Bulgaria) Valentina Dimitrova	Pursuit
30	(Latvia) Sanita Bulina	Pursuit
34	(Slovenia) Lena Repinc	Individual
36	(United States) Kelsey Joan Dickinson	Individual
37	(Canada) Benita Peiffer	Pursuit
39	(Austria) Kristina Oberthaler	Pursuit
40	(Ukraine) Anna Kryvonos	Individual
43	(Ukraine) Khrystyna Dmytrenko	Individual
44	(Slovakia) Zuzana Remeňová	Pursuit
46	(Norway) Frida Dokken	Individual
46	(Moldova) Aliona Makarova	Pursuit
47	(Bulgaria) Lora Hristova	Pursuit
48	(Ukraine) Liubov Kypiachenkova	Individual
59	(Finland) Sonja Leinamo	Individual
61	(Poland) Kamila Cichon	Individual
64	(Finland) Noora Kaisa Keranen	Individual
67	(Italy) Beatrice Trabucchi	Sprint
70	(Poland) Daria Gembicka	Sprint
71	(Australia) Darcie Morton	Sprint
75	(Finland) Inka Hamalainen	Individual
75	(United States) Margie Freed	Sprint
82	(Kazakhstan) Arina Kryukova	Sprint
84	(Romania) Andreea Mezdrea	Sprint
85	(Lithuania) Judita Traubaite	Sprint
89	(Slovakia) Ema Kapustova	Sprint
95	(Estonia) Hanna-Brita Kaasik	Individual
Debut
10	(Norway) Marit Ishol Skogan	Individual
43	(Ukraine) Khrystyna Dmytrenko	Individual
46	(Norway) Frida Dokken	Individual
61	(Poland) Kamila Cichon	Individual
70	(Poland) Daria Gembicka	Sprint
75	(Finland) Inka Hamalainen	Individual
82	(Kazakhstan) Arina Kryukova	Sprint
93	(United States) Margie Freed	Individual
94	(Lithuania) Judita Traubaite	Individual
95	(Estonia) Hanna-Brita Kaasik	Individual
