= 2023–24 Biathlon World Cup – Stage 4 =

2023–24 Biathlon World Cup Stage

The 2023–24 Biathlon World Cup – Stage 4 was the second event of the season and was held in Oberhof, Germany, from 5 to 7 January 2024.

== Schedule of events ==
The events took place at the following times.

Date	Time	Events
5 January	13:20 CET	Men's 10 km Sprint
5 January	16:25 CET	Women's 7.5 km Sprint
6 January	14:25 CET	Men's 12.5 km Pursuit
6 January	16:40 CET	Women's 10 km Pursuit
7 January	13:30 CET	4 x 7.5 km Men's Relay
7 January	16:25 CET	4 x 6 km Women's Relay

== Medal winners ==
=== Men ===
Event:	Gold:	Time	Silver:	Time	Bronze:	Time
10 km Sprint	Benedikt Doll; Germany	24:12.2 (0+1)	Sturla Holm Lægreid; Norway	24:14.0 (0+1)	Endre Strømsheim; Norway	24:17.6 (0+1)
12.5 km Pursuit	Endre Strømsheim; Norway	33:04.2 (0+0+0+2)	Sturla Holm Lægreid; Norway	+17.8 (0+1+1+0)	Johannes Dale-Skjevdal; Norway	+36.4 (1+0+0+0)
4 x 7,5 km Men Relay	Norway; Endre Strømsheim; Sturla Holm Lægreid; Tarjei Bø; Johannes Thingnes Bø	1:17:34.2 (0+2) (0+1) (0+2) (0+0) (0+2) (0+0) (0+0) (0+0)	Germany; Roman Rees; Benedikt Doll; Philipp Nawrath; Philipp Horn	1:19:36.1 (0+0) (0+3) (0+2) (0+3) (0+0) (1+3) (0+1) (0+3)	Italy; Elia Zeni; Didier Bionaz; Lukas Hofer; Tommaso Giacomel	1:20:24.7 (0+3) (0+3) (0+1) (0+3) (0+1) (0+0) (0+3) (0+2)

=== Women ===
Event:	Gold:	Time	Silver:	Time	Bronze:	Time
7.5 km Sprint	Justine Braisaz-Bouchet; France	22:43.0 (2+0)	Franziska Preuß; Germany	22:47.4 (0+0)	Sophie Chauveau; France	22:47.6 (1+0)
10 km Pursuit	Julia Simon; France	31:45.2 (1+0+0+1)	Justine Braisaz-Bouchet; France	+18.9 (0+0+1+2)	Ingrid Landmark Tandrevold; Norway	+44.4 (0+0+1+1)
4 x 6 km Women Relay	France; Lou Jeanmonnot; Justine Braisaz-Bouchet; Sophie Chauveau; Julia Simon	1:12:42.5 (0+1) (0+9) (0+1) (0+3) (0+1) (0+3) (0+0) (0+3)	Norway; Juni Arnekleiv; Marit Ishol Skogan; Karoline Offigstad Knotten; Ingrid Landmark Tandrevold	1:12:51.8 (0+1) (0+3) (0+1) (0+1) (0+1) (0+2) (0+0) (0+1)	Sweden; Anna Magnusson; Linn Persson; Hanna Öberg; Elvira Öberg	1:13:16.0 (0+1) (0+1) (0+0) (0+1) (1+3) (0+1) (0+1) (0+0)

== Achievements ==
Best individual performance for all time

Men
Place	Name	Age	Race
1	(Norway) Endre Strømsheim	26	Pursuit
16	(Kazakhstan) Alexandr Mukhin	25	Sprint
24	(Norway) Johan-Olav Botn	24	Pursuit
27	(Latvia) Renars Birkentals	22	Sprint
31	(Ukraine) Vitalii Mandzyn	20	Sprint
35	(Poland) Konrad Badacz	20	Pursuit
42	(Czech Republic) Vitezslav Hornig	24	Sprint
73	(Switzerland) Sandro Bovisi	26	Sprint
80	(Belgium) Marek Mackels	24	Sprint
90	(Estonia) Mehis Udam	19	Sprint
96	(Moldova) Andrei Usov	29	Sprint
99	(Japan) Masaharu Yamamoto	23	Sprint
Debut
26	(Norway) Johan-Olav Botn	24	Sprint
73	(Switzerland) Sandro Bovisi	26	Sprint
90	(Estonia) Mehis Udam	19	Sprint
99	(Japan) Masaharu Yamamoto	23	Sprint

Women
Place	Name	Age	Race
3	(France) Sophie Chauveau	24	Sprint
8	(France) Jeanne Richard	21	Sprint
23	(Sweden) Sara Andersson	20	Sprint
25	(Slovakia) Ema Kapustova	21	Pursuit
28	(France) Oceane Michelon	21	Sprint
31	(Lithuania) Lidiia Zhurauskaite	24	Sprint
56	(Australia) Darcie Morton	24	Sprint
57	(Croatia) Anika Kozica	26	Sprint
71	(Estonia) Hanna-Brita Kaasik	24	Sprint
Debut
8	(France) Jeanne Richard	21	Sprint
28	(France) Oceane Michelon	21	Sprint
