= 2023–24 Biathlon World Cup – Stage 3 =

2023–24 Biathlon World Cup Stage

The 2023–24 Biathlon World Cup – Stage 3 was the third event of the season and was held in Lenzerheide, Switzerland, from 14 to 17 December 2023.

== Schedule of events ==
The events took place at the following times.

Date	Time	Events
14 December	16:15 CET	Women's 7.5 km Sprint
15 December	16:15 CET	Men's 10 km Sprint
16 December	14:45 CET	Women's 10 km Pursuit
16 December	16:40 CET	Men's 12.5 km Pursuit
17 December	14:30 CET	12.5 km Women's Mass Start
17 December	16:45 CET	15 km Men's Mass Start

== Medal winners ==
=== Men ===
Event:	Gold:	Time	Silver:	Time	Bronze:	Time
10 km Sprint	Benedikt Doll; Germany	23:15.8 (0+0)	Johannes Thingnes Bø; Norway	23:21.2 (1+0)	Philipp Nawrath; Germany	23:35.6 (1+0)
12.5 km Pursuit	Johannes Thingnes Bø; Norway	32:30.0 (0+1+2+0)	Endre Strømsheim; Norway	+24.7 (1+0+0+1)	Sturla Holm Lægreid; Norway	+29.1 (0+0+0+1)
15 km Mass Start	Johannes Thingnes Bø; Norway	35:00.1 (1+0+1+0)	Johannes Dale-Skjevdal; Norway	+14.6 (0+0+0+1)	Tarjei Bø; Norway	+21.8 (0+0+0+1)

=== Women ===
Event:	Gold:	Time	Silver:	Time	Bronze:	Time
7.5 km Sprint	Justine Braisaz-Bouchet; France	22:13.0 (0+0)	Ingrid Landmark Tandrevold; Norway	22:25.2 (0+0)	Lisa Vittozzi; Italy	22:30.2 (0+0)
10 km Pursuit	Justine Braisaz-Bouchet; France	27:31.0 (1+0+1+1)	Julia Simon; France	+25.2 (0+0+2+0)	Marit Ishol Skogan; Norway	+1:13.6 (0+2+0+0)
12.5 km Mass Start	Justine Braisaz-Bouchet; France	36:04.6 (0+0+0+0)	Elvira Öberg; Sweden	+5.5 (1+1+0+0)	Hanna Öberg; Sweden	+10.6 (1+1+0+0)

== Achievements ==
Best individual performance for all time

Men
Place	Name	Race
2	(Norway) Endre Strømsheim	Pursuit
4	(Germany) Philipp Horn	Sprint
9	(Slovenia) Lovro Planko	Sprint
23	(Kazakhstan) Alexandr Mukhin	Sprint
32	(Italy) Elia Zeni	Sprint
40	(Finland) Joni Mustonen	Sprint
48	(United States) Vincent Bonacci	Pursuit
55	(Finland) Jonni Mukkala	Pursuit
65	(Lithuania) Jokubas Mackine	Sprint
90	(Slovakia) Damian Cesnek	Sprint
93	(Greece) Nikolaos Tsourekas	Sprint

Women
Place	Name	Race
3	(Norway) Marit Ishol Skogan	Pursuit
25	(Ukraine) Khrystyna Dmytrenko	Mass Start
28	(Slovakia) Ema Kapustova	Pursuit
33	(Bulgaria) Lora Hristova	Pursuit
40	(Finland) Noora Kaisa Keranen	Sprint
47	(Finland) Sonja Leinamo	Sprint
49	(Lithuania) Judita Traubaite	Sprint
50	(Romania) Andreea Mezdrea	Sprint
59	(Lithuania) Lidiia Zhurauskaite	Sprint
61	(Germany) Johanna Puff	Sprint
64	(Kazakhstan) Polina Yegorova	Sprint
74	(United States) Grace Castonguay	Sprint
75	(Estonia) Hanna-Brita Kaasik	Sprint
Debut
61	(Germany) Johanna Puff	Sprint
