= Johannes Dale-Skjevdal =

Norwegian biathlete (born 1997)

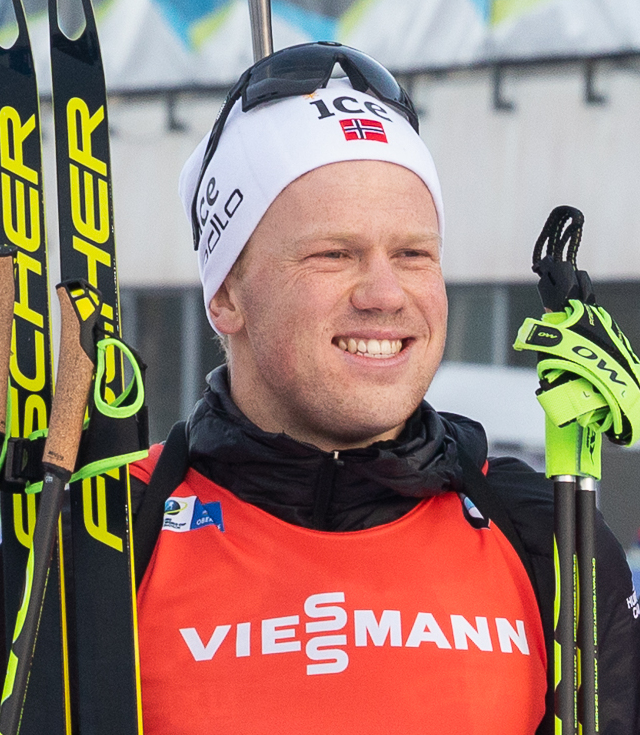

Personal information
- Nationality: Norwegian
- Born: 23 May 1997 (age 29) Lørenskog, Norway

Sport

Professional information
- Sport: Biathlon
- Club: Fet Skiklubb
- World Cup debut: 2018

Olympic Games
- Teams: 1 (2026)
- Medals: 1 (1 gold)

World Championships
- Teams: 2 (2020, 2021)
- Medals: 3 (0 gold)

World Cup
- Seasons: 8 (2018/19–present)
- Individual victories: 5
- All victories: 15
- Individual podiums: 20
- All podiums: 40
- Overall titles: 0
- Discipline titles: 0
Medal record
Men's biathlon
Representing Norway
Olympic Games
Gold medal – first place	2026 Milano Cortina	15 km mass start
World Championships
Silver medal – second place	2020 Antholz	4 × 7.5 km relay
Silver medal – second place	2021 Pokljuka	15 km mass start
Bronze medal – third place	2021 Pokljuka	20 km individual
European Championships
Gold medal – first place	2022 Arber	Mixed relay
Junior World Championships
Silver medal – second place	2017 Osrblie	4 × 7.5 km relay
Silver medal – second place	2018 Otepää	4 × 7.5 km relay
Bronze medal – third place	2018 Otepää	12.5 km pursuit
- Updated on 22 March 2026

Johannes Dale-Skjevdal (born 23 May 1997) is a Norwegian biathlete. He competed at the Biathlon World Championships 2020. He is the Olympic champion in the 15 km mass start event at the 2026 Winter Olympics.

== Biathlon results ==
All results are sourced from the International Biathlon Union.

=== Olympic Games ===
1 medal (1 gold)

Event
Event	Age	Individual	Sprint	Pursuit	Mass Start	Relay	Mixed Relay
(Italy) 2026 Milano Cortina	28	10	6	6	Gold	–	–

=== World Championships ===
3 medals (2 silver, 1 bronze)

Event	Individual	Sprint	Pursuit	Mass start	Relay	Mixed relay	Single mixed relay
(Italy) 2020 Antholz	9th	23rd	17th	8th	Silver	–	–
(Slovenia) 2021 Pokljuka	Bronze	4th	11th	Silver	–	–	–
(Czech Republic) 2024 Nové Město	30th	7th	4th	–	–	–	–

=== World Cup ===
==== Season standings ====
Season	Age	Overall	Individual	Sprint	Pursuit	Mass start
2018–19	21	50	—	39	43	—
2019–20	22	9	10	11	12	4
2020–21	23	5	8	5	7	8
2021–22	24	65	41	84	48	—
2022–23	25	7	10	10	13	4
2023–24	26	3	9	7	2	2
2024–25	27	25	11	28	37	24
2025–26	28	10	37	10	4	14

- Standings through 22 March 2026

==== Individual podiums ====
- 5 victory - (1 Sp, 2 Pu, 2 Ms)
- 20 podiums - (5 Sp, 7 Pu, 1 In, 7 Ms)

No.	Season	Date	Location	Level	Race	Place
1	2020–21	11 December 2020	(Austria) Hochfilzen	World Cup	Sprint	1st
2	2020–21	12 December 2020	(Austria) Hochfilzen	World Cup	Pursuit	3rd
3	2020–21	17 December 2020	(Austria) Hochfilzen	World Cup	Sprint	2nd
4	2020–21	9 January 2021	(Germany) Oberhof	World Cup	Pursuit	2nd
5	2020–21	17 February 2021	(Slovenia) Pokljuka	World Championships	Individual	3rd
6	2020–21	21 February 2021	(Slovenia) Pokljuka	World Championships	Mass start	2nd
7	2022–23	18 December 2022	(France) Le Grand-Bornand	World Cup	Mass start	1st
8	2022–23	12 March 2023	(Sweden) Östersund	World Cup	Mass start	2nd
9	2023–24	9 December 2023	(Austria) Hochfilzen	World Cup	Pursuit	2nd
10	2023–24	17 December 2023	(Switzerland) Lenzerheide	World Cup	Mass start	2nd
11	2023–24	6 January 2024	(Germany) Oberhof	World Cup	Pursuit	3rd
12	2023–24	14 January 2024	(Germany) Ruhpolding	World Cup	Pursuit	1st
13	2023–24	21 January 2024	(Italy) Antholz-Anterselva	World Cup	Mass start	2nd
14	2023–24	17 March 2024	(Canada) Canmore	World Cup	Mass start	2nd
15	2024–25	21 March 2025	(Norway) Oslo	World Cup	Sprint	3rd
16	2025–26	19 December 2025	(France) Le Grand-Bornand	World Cup	Sprint	2nd
17	2025–26	20 December 2025	(France) Le Grand-Bornand	World Cup	Pursuit	3rd
18	2025–26	8 January 2026	(Germany) Oberhof	World Cup	Sprint	3rd
19	2025–26	18 January 2026	(Germany) Ruhpolding	World Cup	Pursuit	1st
20	2025–26	10 February 2026	(Italy) Antholz-Anterselva	Olympic Games	Mass Start	1st
