= Justus Strelow =

German biathlete (born 1996)

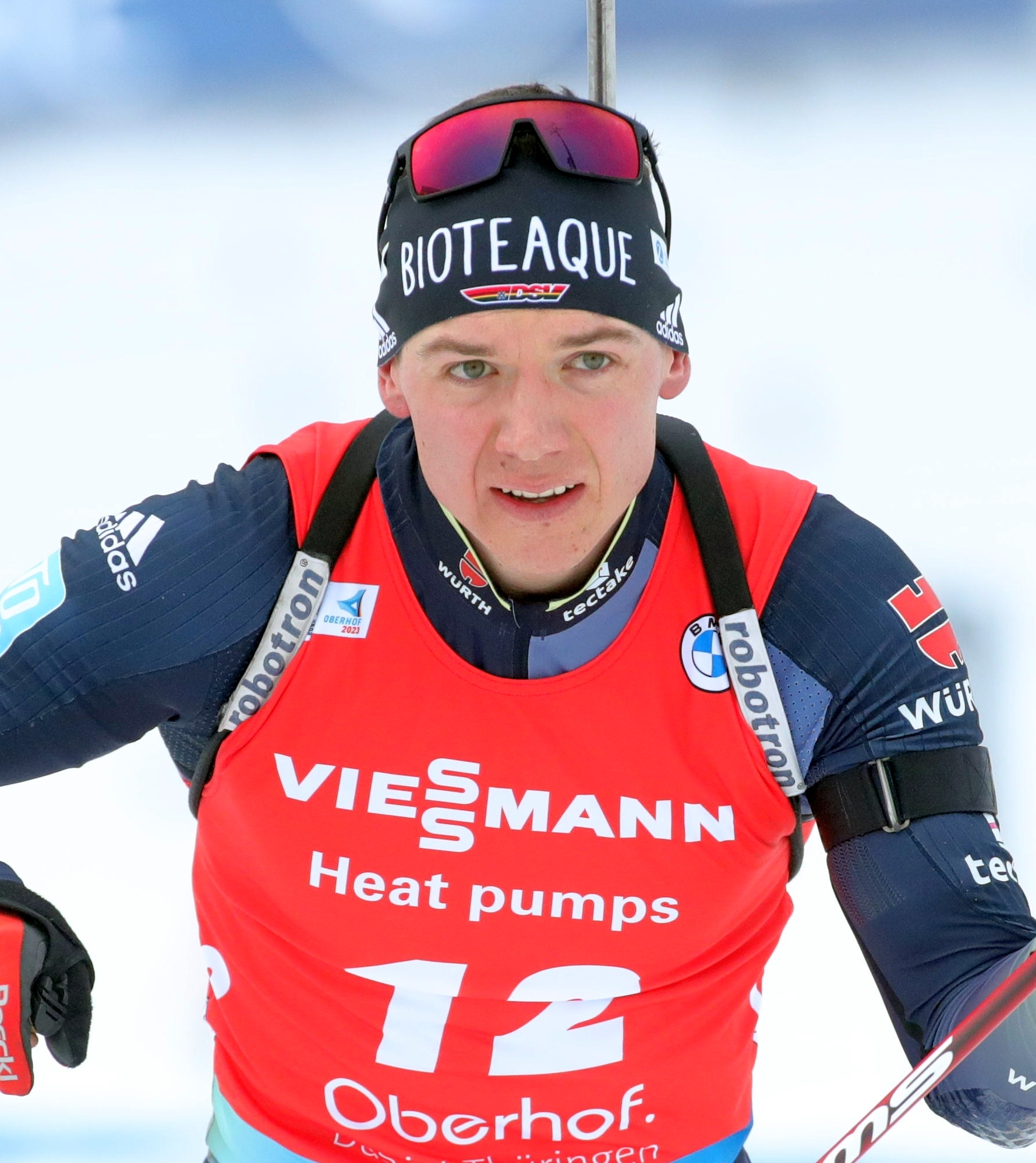
- Strelow in 2023

Personal information
- Nationality: German
- Born: 30 December 1996 (age 29) Dippoldiswalde, Germany
- Height: 1.84 m (6 ft 0 in)
- Weight: 75 kg (165 lb)

Sport

Professional information
- Sport: Biathlon
- Club: SG Stahl Schmiedeberg
- World Cup debut: 2021

World Championships
- Teams: 3 (2023––2025)
- Medals: 2 (0 gold)

World Cup
- Seasons: 4 (2020/21–)
- Individual victories: 0
- All victories: 1
- Individual podiums: 1
- All podiums: 10
Medal record
Olympic Games
Bronze medal – third place	2026 Milano Cortina	Mixed relay
World Championships
Bronze medal – third place	2025 Lenzerheide	Mixed relay
Bronze medal – third place	2025 Lenzerheide	Single mixed relay
European Championships
Gold medal – first place	2021 Duszniki-Zdrój	Single mixed relay
Silver medal – second place	2020 Raubichi	Single mixed relay
Bronze medal – third place	2022 Arber	Single mixed relay
Junior World Championships
Bronze medal – third place	2017 Osrblie	4 × 7.5 km relay
- Updated on 20 February 2025

Justus Strelow (born 30 December 1996) is a German biathlete. He made his Biathlon World Cup debut in 2021 in Östersund. At the Junior World Championships in Osrblie in 2017, he won with team Germany a bronze medal in the relay.

== Career ==
He made his debut in the World Cup competition on 19 March 2021 in Östersund, taking 37th place in the sprint. Thus, he scored his first points in his debut. He stood on the podium for the first time in the first competition of the 2023–24 season. He took second place in the individual race.

On 20 January 2024, together with Vanessa Voigt, he won in the single mixed relay in Antholz.

== Biathlon results ==
All results are sourced from the International Biathlon Union.

=== World Championships ===
2 medals (2 bronze)

Event	Individual	Sprint	Pursuit	Mass Start	Relay	Mixed relay	Single mixed relay
(Germany) 2023 Oberhof	13th	12th	11th	13th	5th		
(Czech Republic) 2024 Nové Město				16th	4th	5th	6th
(Switzerland) 2025 Lenzerheide		30th	31st			Bronze	Bronze

=== World Cup ===
Season	Overall			Individual		Sprint		Pursuit		Mass start	
Season	Races	Points	Position	Points	Position	Points	Position	Points	Position	Points	Position
2020–21	2/26	15	82nd	—	—	4	81st	11	64th	—	—
2021–22	3/22	47	67th	47	13th	—	—	—	—	—	—
2022–23	20/21	350	21st	37	28th	118	20th	108	23rd	87	16th
2023–24	14/21	426	12th	86	4th	141	13th	142	12th	57	9th

=== Individual podiums ===
No.	Season	Date	Location	Race	Level	Placement
1	2023–24	26 November 2023	Östersund, Sweden	20 km Individual	World Cup	2nd

=== Relay podiums ===
No.	Season	Date	Location	Race	Level	Placement	Teammate
1	2022–23	1 December 2022	(Finland) Kontiolahti	Relay	Biathlon World Cup	2nd	Kühn / Doll / Rees
2	2022–23	10 December 2022	(Austria) Hochfilzen	Relay	Biathlon World Cup	3rd	Kühn / Rees / Doll
3	2023–24	11 January 2024	(Germany) Ruhpolding	Relay	Biathlon World Cup	2nd	Kühn / Doll / Nawrath
4	2023–24	20 January 2024	(Italy) Antholz	Single Mixed Relay	Biathlon World Cup	1st	Voigt
5	2023–24	8 March 2024	(United States) Soldier Hollow	Relay	Biathlon World Cup	3rd	Kühn / Doll / Nawrath
6	2024–25	30 November 2024	(Finland) Kontiolahti	Single Mixed Relay	Biathlon World Cup	3rd	Voigt
