= 2023–24 Biathlon World Cup =

Biathlon competition

Discipline	Men	Women
Overall	(Norway) Johannes Thingnes Bø (5)	(Italy) Lisa Vittozzi (1)
U25	(Italy) Tommaso Giacomel (1)	(Sweden) Elvira Öberg (3)
Individual	(Norway) Johannes Thingnes Bø (3)	(Italy) Lisa Vittozzi (3)
Sprint	(Norway) Tarjei Bø (2)	(Norway) Ingrid Landmark Tandrevold (1)
Pursuit	(Norway) Johannes Thingnes Bø (3)	(Italy) Lisa Vittozzi (1)
Mass start	(Norway) Johannes Thingnes Bø (3)	(France) Lou Jeanmonnot (1)
Relay	Norway (15)	Norway (6)
Nations Cup	Norway (20)	France (5)
- Mixed: Norway (9)

Competition
Edition	47th	42nd
Locations	10	10
Individual	21	21
Relay/Team	5	5
Mixed	6	6
Rescheduled	1	1

Overall Champions

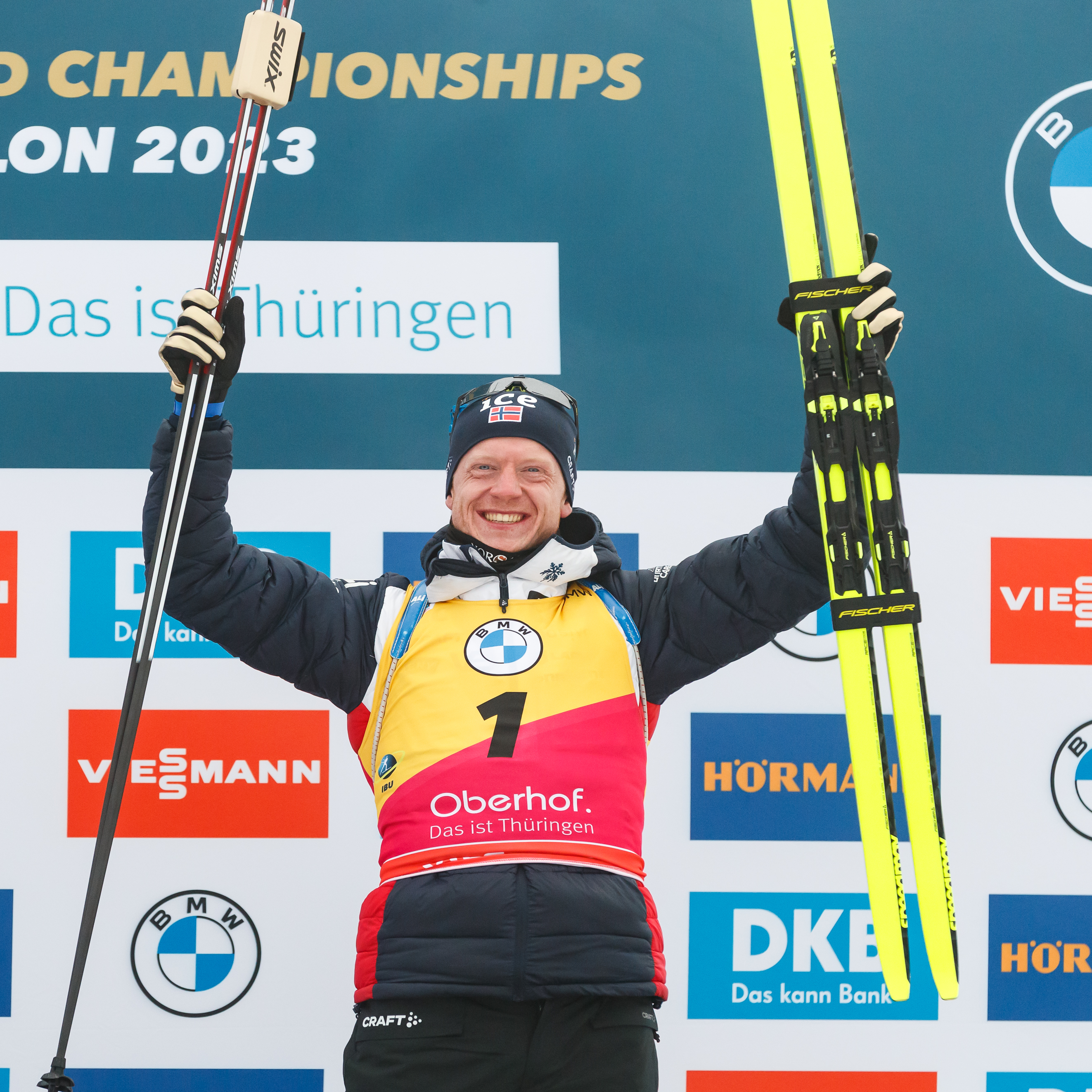
Johannes Thingnes Bø defended the title by winning his fifth World Cup, just ahead of brother Tarjei Bø.

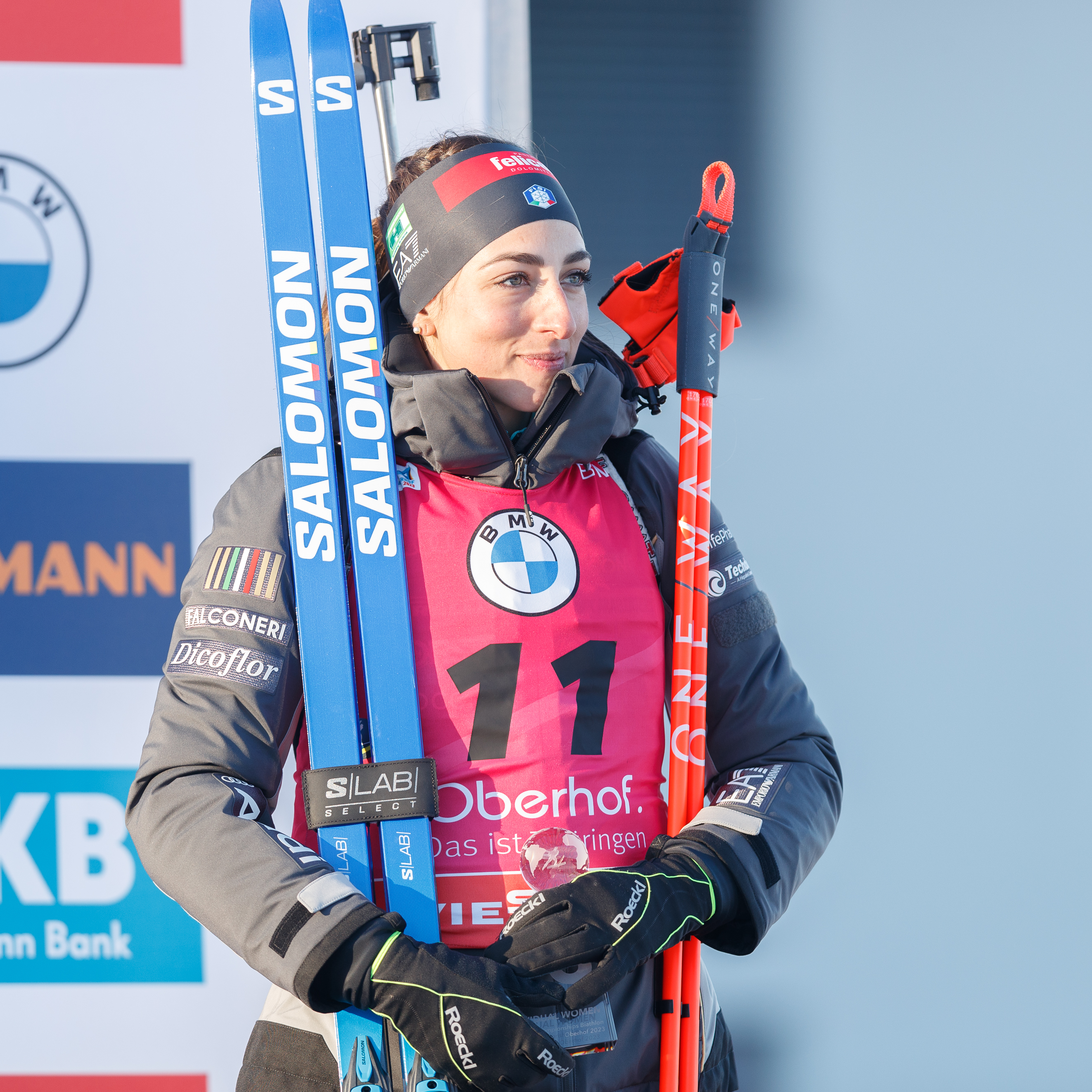
Lisa Vittozzi won the World Cup for the first time in her career, being the second Italian in history to win the World Cup, after Dorothea Wierer.

The 2023–24 Biathlon World Cup (official: BMW IBU World Cup Biathlon) was a multi-race series over a season of biathlon, organised by the International Biathlon Union (IBU). It was the 47th edition for men and 42nd edition for women of the highest international race series in biathlon.

The season started on 25 November 2023 in Östersund, Sweden and concluded on 17 March 2024 in Canmore, Canada.

The highlight of the season were the 2024 Biathlon World Championships in Nové Město na Moravě, Czech Republic, whose results were not included in the World Cup standings (except for the national standings).

For the first time since the 2018–19 season World Cup races was held in North America.

Norwegian men were represented on the podium in every race this season. This is the first time a country has done this since East Germany in the 1979–1980 season.

Johannes Thingnes Bø from Norway (men's) and Julia Simon from France (women's) were the reigning champions from the previous season. Bø defended the title, while Simon finished the season in fifth place.

== Map of world cup hosts ==
All 10 locations hosting world cup events in this season (including Nové Město na Moravě – venue of the World Championships).

(Sweden) Östersund	(Austria) Hochfilzen	(Switzerland) Lenzerheide	(Germany) Oberhof	(Germany) Ruhpolding
Europe
(Italy) Antholz-Anterselva	(Czech Republic) Nové Město na Moravě	(Norway) Oslo Holmenkollen	(United States) Soldier Hollow	(Canada) Canmore
			North America	

World Championships

== Calendar ==
Stage	Location	Date	Individual / Short individual	Sprint	Pursuit	Mass start	Relay	Mixed relay	Single mixed relay	Details
1	(Sweden) Östersund	25 November–3 December	●	●	●		●	●	●	details
2	(Austria) Hochfilzen	8–10 December		●	●		●			details
3	(Switzerland) Lenzerheide	14–17 December		●	●	●				details
4	(Germany) Oberhof	4–7 January		●	●		●			details
5	(Germany) Ruhpolding	10–14 January		●	●		●			details
6	(Italy) Antholz-Anterselva	18–21 January	●			●		●	●	details
WCH	(Czech Republic) Nové Město na Moravě	7–18 February	●	●	●	●	●	●	●	World Championships
7	(Norway) Oslo Holmenkollen	29 February–3 March	●			●		●	●	details
8	(United States) Soldier Hollow, Utah	8–10 March		●	●		●			details
9	(Canada) Canmore	14–17 March		●	●	●				details
Total: 70 (31 men's, 31 women's, 8 mixed)			4	8	8	5	6	4	4	

== Men ==
=== Calendar ===
Key: IND – Individual / SIND – Short Individual / SPR – Sprint / PUR – Pursuit / MSS – Mass Start
#	Date	Place (In brackets Stage)	Discipline	Winner	Second	Third	R.
1	26 November 2023	(Sweden) Östersund (1)	20 km IND	(Germany) Roman Rees	(Germany) Justus Strelow	(Norway) Johannes Thingnes Bø	
2	2 December 2023	(Sweden) Östersund (1)	10 km SPR	(Germany) Philipp Nawrath	(Norway) Tarjei Bø	(Norway) Vebjørn Sørum	
3	3 December 2023	(Sweden) Östersund (1)	12.5 km PUR	(Sweden) Sebastian Samuelsson	(Germany) Philipp Nawrath	(Norway) Vetle Sjåstad Christiansen	
4	8 December 2023	(Austria) Hochfilzen (2)	10 km SPR	(Norway) Tarjei Bø	(Norway) Sturla Holm Lægreid	(Sweden) Sebastian Samuelsson	
5	9 December 2023	(Austria) Hochfilzen (2)	12.5 km PUR	(Norway) Johannes Thingnes Bø	(Norway) Johannes Dale-Skjevdal	(Norway) Tarjei Bø	
6	15 December 2023	(Switzerland) Lenzerheide (3)	10 km SPR	(Germany) Benedikt Doll	(Norway) Johannes Thingnes Bø	(Germany) Philipp Nawrath	
7	16 December 2023	(Switzerland) Lenzerheide (3)	12.5 km PUR	(Norway) Johannes Thingnes Bø	(Norway) Endre Strømsheim	(Norway) Sturla Holm Lægreid	
8	17 December 2023	(Switzerland) Lenzerheide (3)	15 km MSS	(Norway) Johannes Thingnes Bø	(Norway) Johannes Dale-Skjevdal	(Norway) Tarjei Bø	
9	(Note: Men's Sprint originally scheduled for 4 January 2024 (Thursday), was rescheduled to 5 January 2024 (Friday), due to bad weather.)5 January 2024	(Germany) Oberhof (4)	10 km SPR	(Germany) Benedikt Doll	(Norway) Sturla Holm Lægreid	(Norway) Endre Strømsheim	
10	6 January 2024	(Germany) Oberhof (4)	12.5 km PUR	(Norway) Endre Strømsheim	(Norway) Sturla Holm Lægreid	(Norway) Johannes Dale-Skjevdal	
11	13 January 2024	(Germany) Ruhpolding (5)	10 km SPR	(Norway) Vetle Sjåstad Christiansen	(Italy) Tommaso Giacomel	(Norway) Tarjei Bø	
12	14 January 2024	(Germany) Ruhpolding (5)	12.5 km PUR	(Norway) Johannes Dale-Skjevdal	(Norway) Vetle Sjåstad Christiansen	(Norway) Johannes Thingnes Bø	
13	18 January 2024	(Italy) Antholz-Anterselva (6)	15 km SIND	(Norway) Johannes Thingnes Bø	(Norway) Tarjei Bø	(Germany) Johannes Kühn	
14	21 January 2024	(Italy) Antholz-Anterselva (6)	15 km MSS	(Norway) Vetle Sjåstad Christiansen	(Norway) Johannes Dale-Skjevdal	(Norway) Vebjørn Sørum	
Biathlon World Championships 2024 (7–18 February) (Note: not included in the World Cup)
	10 February 2024	(Czech Republic) Nové Město na Moravě	10 km SPR	(Norway) Sturla Holm Lægreid	(Norway) Johannes Thingnes Bø	(Norway) Vetle Sjåstad Christiansen	
	11 February 2024	(Czech Republic) Nové Město na Moravě	12.5 km PUR	(Norway) Johannes Thingnes Bø	(Norway) Sturla Holm Lægreid	(Norway) Vetle Sjåstad Christiansen	
	14 February 2024	(Czech Republic) Nové Město na Moravě	20 km IND	(Norway) Johannes Thingnes Bø	(Norway) Tarjei Bø	(Germany) Benedikt Doll	
	18 February 2024	(Czech Republic) Nové Město na Moravě	15 km MSS	(Norway) Johannes Thingnes Bø	(Latvia) Andrejs Rastorgujevs	(France) Quentin Fillon Maillet	
15	1 March 2024	(Norway) Oslo Holmenkollen (7)	20 km IND	(Norway) Sturla Holm Lægreid	(Norway) Tarjei Bø	(Norway) Vetle Sjåstad Christiansen	
16	2 March 2024	(Norway) Oslo Holmenkollen (7)	15 km MSS	(Norway) Sturla Holm Lægreid	(Germany) Benedikt Doll	(Sweden) Jesper Nelin	
17	9 March 2024	(United States) Soldier Hollow, Utah (8)	10 km SPR	(France) Éric Perrot	(France) Émilien Jacquelin	(Norway) Johan-Olav Botn	
18	10 March 2024	(United States) Soldier Hollow, Utah (8)	12.5 km PUR	(Norway) Johannes Thingnes Bø	(Norway) Tarjei Bø	(France) Émilien Jacquelin	
19	15 March 2024	(Canada) Canmore (9)	10 km SPR	(Norway) Johannes Thingnes Bø	(Italy) Tommaso Giacomel	(Norway) Tarjei Bø	
20	16 March 2024	(Canada) Canmore (9)	12.5 km PUR	(Norway) Johannes Thingnes Bø	(Sweden) Sebastian Samuelsson	(France) Éric Perrot	
21	17 March 2024	(Canada) Canmore (9)	15 km MSS	(Norway) Johannes Thingnes Bø	(Norway) Johannes Dale-Skjevdal	(France) Émilien Jacquelin	
47th Biathlon World Cup Overall (26 November 2023 – 17 March 2024)				(Norway) Johannes Thingnes Bø	(Norway) Tarjei Bø	(Norway) Johannes Dale-Skjevdal	

=== Relay – 4 x 7.5 km ===
#	Date	Place (In brackets Stage)	Winner	Second	Third	Leader (After competition)	R.
1	30 November 2023	(Sweden) Östersund (1)	Norway: 1. Endre Strømsheim; 2. Tarjei Bø; 3. Johannes Thingnes Bø; 4. Vetle Sjåstad Christiansen	France: 1. Éric Perrot; 2. Émilien Jacquelin; 3. Fabien Claude; 4. Quentin Fillon Maillet	Germany: 1. David Zobel; 2. Philipp Nawrath; 3. Benedikt Doll; 4. Johannes Kühn	Norway	
2	10 December 2023	(Austria) Hochfilzen (2)	Norway: 1. Sturla Holm Lægreid; 2. Tarjei Bø; 3. Johannes Thingnes Bø; 4. Vetle Sjåstad Christiansen	France: 1. Éric Perrot; 2. Émilien Jacquelin; 3. Fabien Claude; 4. Quentin Fillon Maillet	Germany: 1. David Zobel; 2. Johannes Kühn; 3. Philipp Nawrath; 4. Benedikt Doll	Norway	
3	7 January 2024	(Germany) Oberhof (4)	Norway: 1. Endre Strømsheim; 2. Sturla Holm Lægreid; 3. Tarjei Bø; 4. Johannes Thingnes Bø	Germany: 1. Roman Rees; 2. Benedikt Doll; 3. Philipp Nawrath; 4. Philipp Horn	Italy: 1. Elia Zeni; 2. Didier Bionaz; 3. Lukas Hofer; 4. Tommaso Giacomel	Norway	
4	11 January 2024	(Germany) Ruhpolding (5)	Norway: 1. Sturla Holm Lægreid; 2. Johannes Dale-Skjevdal; 3. Tarjei Bø; 4. Vetle Sjåstad Christiansen	Germany: 1. Justus Strelow; 2. Johannes Kühn; 3. Benedikt Doll; 4. Philipp Nawrath	Italy: 1. Elia Zeni; 2. Didier Bionaz; 3. Lukas Hofer; 4. Tommaso Giacomel	Norway	
WCH	17 February 2024	(Czech Republic) Nové Město na Moravě	Sweden: 1. Viktor Brandt; 2. Jesper Nelin; 3. Martin Ponsiluoma; 4. Sebastian Samuelsson	Norway: 1. Sturla Holm Lægreid; 2. Tarjei Bø; 3. Johannes Thingnes Bø; 4. Vetle Sjåstad Christiansen	France: 1. Éric Perrot; 2. Fabien Claude; 3. Émilien Jacquelin; 4. Quentin Fillon Maillet	not included in the World Cup	
5	8 March 2024	(United States) Soldier Hollow, Utah (8)	Norway: 1. Sturla Holm Lægreid; 2. Tarjei Bø; 3. Johannes Thingnes Bø; 4. Vetle Sjåstad Christiansen	Italy: 1. Patrick Braunhofer; 2. Tommaso Giacomel; 3. Didier Bionaz; 4. Lukas Hofer	Germany: 1. Justus Strelow; 2. Johannes Kühn; 3. Benedikt Doll; 4. Philipp Nawrath	Norway	

=== Overall leaders ===
==== Overall ====
No.	Holder	Date gained	Place	Date forfeited	Place	Number of competitions
1.	(Germany) Roman Rees	26 November 2023	(Sweden) Östersund	2 December 2023	(Sweden) Östersund	1
2.	(Germany) Philipp Nawrath	2 December 2023	(Sweden) Östersund	8 December 2023	(Austria) Hochfilzen	2
3.	(Sweden) Sebastian Samuelsson	8 December 2023	(Austria) Hochfilzen	9 December 2023	(Austria) Hochfilzen	1
4.	(Norway) Tarjei Bø	9 December 2023	(Austria) Hochfilzen	16 December 2023	(Switzerland) Lenzerheide	2
5.	(Norway) Johannes Thingnes Bø	16 December 2023	(Switzerland) Lenzerheide	Overall Winner		15

==== Under 25 ====
No.	Holder	Date gained	Place	Date forfeited	Place	Number of competitions
1.	(Italy) Tommaso Giacomel	26 November 2023	(Sweden) Östersund	U25 Winner		21

=== Standings ===
==== Overall ====
Rank	after 21 events	Points
	(Norway) Johannes Thingnes Bø	1262
2	(Norway) Tarjei Bø	1080
3	(Norway) Johannes Dale-Skjevdal	949
4	(Norway) Sturla Holm Lægreid	862
5	(Norway) Vetle Sjåstad Christiansen	817
6	(France) Émilien Jacquelin	712
7	(Norway) Endre Strømsheim	700
8	(Italy) Tommaso Giacomel	688
9	(Sweden) Sebastian Samuelsson	671
10	(Sweden) Martin Ponsiluoma	638

==== Under 25 ====
Rank	after 21 events	Points
	(Italy) Tommaso Giacomel	688
2	(France) Éric Perrot	622
3	(Italy) Didier Bionaz	348
4	(Norway) Johan-Olav Botn	231
5	(United States) Campbell Wright	216
6	(Switzerland) Niklas Hartweg	206
7	(Finland) Otto Invenius	161
8	(Germany) Danilo Riethmüller	153
9	(Slovenia) Lovro Planko	108
10	(Slovenia) Anton Vidmar	64

==== Individual ====
Rank	after 3 events	Points
	(Norway) Johannes Thingnes Bø	195
2	(Norway) Tarjei Bø	165
3	(Germany) Roman Rees	137
4	(Norway) Sturla Holm Lægreid	135
5	(Norway) Vetle Sjåstad Christiansen	128

==== Sprint ====
Rank	after 7 events	Points
	(Norway) Tarjei Bø	384
2	(Norway) Johannes Thingnes Bø	324
3	(Norway) Sturla Holm Lægreid	302
4	(Germany) Benedikt Doll	301
5	(Italy) Tommaso Giacomel	282

==== Pursuit ====
Rank	after 7 events	Points
	(Norway) Johannes Thingnes Bø	491
2	(Norway) Johannes Dale-Skjevdal	353
3	(Norway) Tarjei Bø	350
4	(Sweden) Sebastian Samuelsson	315
5	(Norway) Sturla Holm Lægreid	294

==== Mass start ====
Rank	after 4 events	Points
	(Norway) Johannes Thingnes Bø	252
2	(Norway) Johannes Dale-Skjevdal	249
3	(Norway) Vetle Sjåstad Christiansen	200
4	(Norway) Tarjei Bø	181
5	(France) Émilien Jacquelin	151

==== Relay ====
Rank	after 5 events	Points
1	Norway	450
2	Germany	330
3	Italy	290
4	France	270
5	Sweden	209

==== Nations Cup ====
Rank	after 26 events	Points
1	Norway	9375
2	Germany	8309
3	France	8131
4	Sweden	7593
5	Italy	7546

== Women ==
=== Calendar ===
Key: IND – Individual / SIND – Short Individual / SPR – Sprint / PUR – Pursuit / MSS – Mass Start
#	Date	Place (In brackets Stage)	Discipline	Winner	Second	Third	R.
1	26 November 2023	(Sweden) Östersund (1)	15 km IND	(Italy) Lisa Vittozzi	(Germany) Franziska Preuß	(Germany) Vanessa Voigt	
2	1 December 2023	(Sweden) Östersund (1)	7.5 km SPR	(France) Lou Jeanmonnot	(Norway) Karoline Offigstad Knotten	(Norway) Juni Arnekleiv	
3	3 December 2023	(Sweden) Östersund (1)	10 km PUR	(France) Lou Jeanmonnot	(Germany) Franziska Preuß	(Germany) Vanessa Voigt	
4	8 December 2023	(Austria) Hochfilzen (2)	7.5 km SPR	(Norway) Ingrid Landmark Tandrevold	(Sweden) Elvira Öberg	(France) Justine Braisaz-Bouchet	
5	9 December 2023	(Austria) Hochfilzen (2)	10 km PUR	(Sweden) Elvira Öberg	(Switzerland) Lena Häcki-Groß	(Norway) Ingrid Landmark Tandrevold	
6	14 December 2023	(Switzerland) Lenzerheide (3)	7.5 km SPR	(France) Justine Braisaz-Bouchet	(Norway) Ingrid Landmark Tandrevold	(Italy) Lisa Vittozzi	
7	16 December 2023	(Switzerland) Lenzerheide (3)	10 km PUR	(France) Justine Braisaz-Bouchet	(France) Julia Simon	(Norway) Marit Ishol Skogan	
8	17 December 2023	(Switzerland) Lenzerheide (3)	12.5 km MSS	(France) Justine Braisaz-Bouchet	(Sweden) Elvira Öberg	(Sweden) Hanna Öberg	
9	5 January 2024	(Germany) Oberhof (4)	7.5 km SPR	(France) Justine Braisaz-Bouchet	(Germany) Franziska Preuß	(France) Sophie Chauveau	
10	6 January 2024	(Germany) Oberhof (4)	10 km PUR	(France) Julia Simon	(France) Justine Braisaz-Bouchet	(Norway) Ingrid Landmark Tandrevold	
11	12 January 2024	(Germany) Ruhpolding (5)	7.5 km SPR	(Norway) Ingrid Landmark Tandrevold	(Sweden) Mona Brorsson	(Italy) Lisa Vittozzi	
12	14 January 2024	(Germany) Ruhpolding (5)	10 km PUR	(Italy) Lisa Vittozzi	(Norway) Ingrid Landmark Tandrevold	(Norway) Juni Arnekleiv	
13	19 January 2024	(Italy) Antholz-Anterselva (6)	12.5 km SIND	(Switzerland) Lena Häcki-Groß	(France) Julia Simon	(France) Lou Jeanmonnot	
14	21 January 2024	(Italy) Antholz-Anterselva (6)	12.5 km MSS	(France) Julia Simon	(France) Lou Jeanmonnot	(Switzerland) Lena Häcki-Groß	
Biathlon World Championships 2024 (7–18 February)
	9 February 2024	(Czech Republic) Nové Město na Moravě	7.5 km SPR	(France) Julia Simon	(France) Justine Braisaz-Bouchet	(France) Lou Jeanmonnot	
	11 February 2024	(Czech Republic) Nové Město na Moravě	10 km PUR	(France) Julia Simon	(Italy) Lisa Vittozzi	(France) Justine Braisaz-Bouchet	
	13 February 2024	(Czech Republic) Nové Město na Moravě	15 km IND	(Italy) Lisa Vittozzi	(Germany) Janina Hettich-Walz	(France) Julia Simon	
	18 February 2024	(Czech Republic) Nové Město na Moravě	12.5 km MSS	(France) Justine Braisaz-Bouchet	(Italy) Lisa Vittozzi	(France) Lou Jeanmonnot	
15	(Note: Women's Individual originally scheduled for 29 February 2024 (Thursday), was rescheduled to 1 March 2024 (Friday), due to bad weather conditions.)1 March 2024	(Norway) Oslo Holmenkollen (7)	15 km IND	(Norway) Ingrid Landmark Tandrevold	(Sweden) Elvira Öberg	(Norway) Ida Lien	
16	2 March 2024	(Norway) Oslo Holmenkollen (7)	12.5 km MSS	(Switzerland) Lena Häcki-Groß	(France) Julia Simon	(France) Lou Jeanmonnot	
17	8 March 2024	(United States) Soldier Hollow, Utah (8)	7.5 km SPR	(France) Justine Braisaz-Bouchet	(Norway) Ingrid Landmark Tandrevold	(France) Lou Jeanmonnot	
18	10 March 2024	(United States) Soldier Hollow, Utah (8)	10 km PUR	(France) Lou Jeanmonnot	(Italy) Lisa Vittozzi	(France) Julia Simon	
19	14 March 2024	(Canada) Canmore (9)	7.5 km SPR	(Italy) Lisa Vittozzi	(France) Lou Jeanmonnot	(Switzerland) Lena Häcki-Groß	
20	16 March 2024	(Canada) Canmore (9)	10 km PUR	(Italy) Lisa Vittozzi	(France) Lou Jeanmonnot	(France) Justine Braisaz-Bouchet	
21	17 March 2024	(Canada) Canmore (9)	12.5 km MSS	(France) Lou Jeanmonnot	(Germany) Janina Hettich-Walz	(France) Gilonne Guigonnat	
42nd Biathlon World Cup Overall (26 November 2023 – 17 March 2024)				(Italy) Lisa Vittozzi	(France) Lou Jeanmonnot	(Norway) Ingrid Landmark Tandrevold	

=== Relay – 4 x 6 km ===
#	Date	Place (In brackets Stage)	Winner	Second	Third	Leader (After competition)	R.
1	29 November 2023	(Sweden) Östersund (1)	Norway: 1. Marthe Kråkstad Johansen; 2. Juni Arnekleiv; 3. Karoline Offigstad Knotten; 4. Ingrid Landmark Tandrevold	Sweden: 1. Anna Magnusson; 2. Linn Persson; 3. Elvira Öberg; 4. Hanna Öberg	Germany: 1. Janina Hettich-Walz; 2. Selina Grotian; 3. Vanessa Voigt; 4. Franziska Preuß	Norway	
2	10 December 2023	(Austria) Hochfilzen (2)	Norway: 1. Juni Arnekleiv; 2. Marit Ishol Skogan; 3. Karoline Offigstad Knotten; 4. Ingrid Landmark Tandrevold	Sweden: 1. Anna Magnusson; 2. Mona Brorsson; 3. Hanna Öberg; 4. Elvira Öberg	France: 1. Gilonne Guigonnat; 2. Lou Jeanmonnot; 3. Justine Braisaz-Bouchet; 4. Julia Simon	Norway	
3	7 January 2024	(Germany) Oberhof (4)	France: 1. Lou Jeanmonnot; 2. Justine Braisaz-Bouchet; 3. Sophie Chauveau; 4. Julia Simon	Norway: 1. Juni Arnekleiv; 2. Marit Ishol Skogan; 3. Karoline Offigstad Knotten; 4. Ingrid Landmark Tandrevold	Sweden: 1. Anna Magnusson; 2. Linn Persson; 3. Hanna Öberg; 4. Elvira Öberg	Norway	
4	10 January 2024	(Germany) Ruhpolding (5)	France: 1. Lou Jeanmonnot; 2. Jeanne Richard; 3. Sophie Chauveau; 4. Julia Simon	Sweden: 1. Anna Magnusson; 2. Linn Persson; 3. Mona Brorsson; 4. Elvira Öberg	Germany: 1. Janina Hettich-Walz; 2. Sophia Schneider; 3. Franziska Preuß; 4. Hanna Kebinger	Norway	
WCH	17 February 2024	(Czech Republic) Nové Město na Moravě	France: 1. Lou Jeanmonnot; 2. Sophie Chauveau; 3. Justine Braisaz-Bouchet; 4. Julia Simon	Sweden: 1. Anna Magnusson; 2. Linn Persson; 3. Hanna Öberg; 4. Elvira Öberg	Germany: 1. Janina Hettich-Walz; 2. Selina Grotian; 3. Vanessa Voigt; 4. Sophia Schneider	not included in the World Cup	
5	9 March 2024	(United States) Soldier Hollow, Utah (8)	Norway: 1. Juni Arnekleiv; 2. Ida Lien; 3. Karoline Offigstad Knotten; 4. Ingrid Landmark Tandrevold	Germany: 1. Janina Hettich-Walz; 2. Selina Grotian; 3. Vanessa Voigt; 4. Julia Kink	Sweden: 1. Anna Magnusson; 2. Mona Brorsson; 3. Hanna Öberg; 4. Elvira Öberg	Norway	

=== Overall leaders ===
==== Overall ====
No.	Holder	Date gained	Place	Date forfeited	Place	Number of competitions
1.	(Italy) Lisa Vittozzi	26 November 2023	(Sweden) Östersund	1 December 2023	(Sweden) Östersund	1
2.	(Norway) Karoline Offigstad Knotten	1 December 2023	(Sweden) Östersund	3 December 2023	(Sweden) Östersund	1
3.	(Germany) Franziska Preuß	1 December 2023	(Sweden) Östersund	8 December 2023	(Austria) Hochfilzen	2
4.	(France) Lou Jeanmonnot	8 December 2023	(Austria) Hochfilzen	9 December 2023	(Austria) Hochfilzen	1
5.	(Norway) Ingrid Landmark Tandrevold	9 December 2023	(Austria) Hochfilzen	17 December 2023	(Switzerland) Lenzerheide	3
6.	(France) Justine Braisaz-Bouchet	17 December 2023	(Switzerland) Lenzerheide	14 January 2024	(Germany) Ruhpolding	4
7.	(Norway) Ingrid Landmark Tandrevold	14 January 2024	(Germany) Ruhpolding	16 March 2024	(Canada) Canmore	7
8.	(Italy) Lisa Vittozzi	16 March 2024	(Canada) Canmore	Overall Winner		2

==== Under 25 ====
No.	Holder	Date gained	Place	Date forfeited	Place	Number of competitions
1.	(Norway) Marthe Kråkstad Johansen	26 November 2023	(Sweden) Östersund	1 December 2023	(Sweden) Östersund	1
2.	(Norway) Juni Arnekleiv	1 December 2023	(Sweden) Östersund	8 December 2023	(Austria) Hochfilzen	2
3.	(Sweden) Elvira Öberg	8 December 2023	(Austria) Hochfilzen	U25 Winner		18

=== Standings ===
==== Overall ====
Rank	after 21 events	Points
	(Italy) Lisa Vittozzi	1091
2	(France) Lou Jeanmonnot	1068
3	(Norway) Ingrid Landmark Tandrevold	1044
4	(France) Justine Braisaz-Bouchet	1025
5	(France) Julia Simon	994
6	(Switzerland) Lena Häcki-Groß	853
7	(Sweden) Elvira Öberg	829
8	(Germany) Vanessa Voigt	631
9	(Norway) Karoline Offigstad Knotten	629
10	(Germany) Janina Hettich-Walz	543

==== Under 25 ====
Rank	after 21 events	Points
	(Sweden) Elvira Öberg	829
2	(Norway) Juni Arnekleiv	492
3	(Czech Republic) Tereza Voborníková	409
4	(Austria) Anna Gandler	351
5	(France) Sophie Chauveau	347
6	(Switzerland) Amy Baserga	264
7	(Germany) Selina Grotian	221
8	(Norway) Marthe Kråkstad Johansen	181
9	(France) Jeanne Richard	157
10	(Italy) Beatrice Trabucchi	95

==== Individual ====
Rank	after 3 events	Points
	(Italy) Lisa Vittozzi	165
2	(Norway) Ingrid Landmark Tandrevold	155
3	(Germany) Vanessa Voigt	150
4	(Switzerland) Lena Häcki-Groß	122
5	(France) Julia Simon	110

==== Sprint ====
Rank	after 7 events	Points
	(Norway) Ingrid Landmark Tandrevold	418
2	(France) Justine Braisaz-Bouchet	410
3	(Italy) Lisa Vittozzi	373
4	(France) Lou Jeanmonnot	333
5	(Sweden) Elvira Öberg	265

==== Pursuit ====
Rank	after 7 events	Points
	(Italy) Lisa Vittozzi	398
2	(France) Julia Simon	384
3	(France) Lou Jeanmonnot	378
4	(France) Justine Braisaz-Bouchet	357
5	(Norway) Ingrid Landmark Tandrevold	318

==== Mass start ====
Rank	after 4 events	Points
	(France) Lou Jeanmonnot	252
2	(France) Julia Simon	241
3	(Switzerland) Lena Häcki-Groß	205
4	(France) Justine Braisaz-Bouchet	202
5	(Sweden) Elvira Öberg	159

==== Relay ====
Rank	after 5 events	Points
1	Norway	376
2	Sweden	345
3	France	325
4	Germany	285
5	Italy	206

==== Nations Cup ====
Rank	after 26 events	Points
1	France	8719
2	Norway	8376
3	Sweden	8295
4	Germany	8058
5	Italy	7380

== Mixed Relay ==
#	Date	Place (In brackets Stage)	Discipline	Winner	Second	Third	Leader (After competition)	R.
1	25 November 2023	(Sweden) Östersund (1)	6 km + 7.5 km	Sweden: 1. Sebastian Samuelsson; 2. Hanna Öberg	Norway: 1. Sturla Holm Lægreid; 2. Juni Arnekleiv	France: 1. Fabien Claude; 2. Julia Simon	Sweden	
2	25 November 2023	(Sweden) Östersund (1)	4 x 6 km	France: 1. Quentin Fillon Maillet; 2. Émilien Jacquelin; 3. Justine Braisaz-Bouchet; 4. Lou Jeanmonnot	Norway: 1. Tarjei Bø; 2. Johannes Thingnes Bø; 3. Karoline Offigstad Knotten; 4. Ingrid Landmark Tandrevold	Italy: 1. Didier Bionaz; 2. Tommaso Giacomel; 3. Dorothea Wierer; 4. Lisa Vittozzi	France	
3	20 January 2024	(Italy) Antholz-Anterselva (6)	6 km + 7.5 km	Germany: 1. Vanessa Voigt; 2. Justus Strelow	Norway: 1. Ingrid Landmark Tandrevold; 2. Vetle Sjåstad Christiansen	Austria: 1. Lisa Theresa Hauser; 2. Simon Eder	Norway	
4	20 January 2024	(Italy) Antholz-Anterselva (6)	4 x 6 km	Norway: 1. Juni Arnekleiv; 2. Karoline Offigstad Knotten; 3. Tarjei Bø; 4. Johannes Thingnes Bø	Italy: 1. Dorothea Wierer; 2. Lisa Vittozzi; 3. Didier Bionaz; 4. Tommaso Giacomel	Sweden: 1. Anna Magnusson; 2. Elvira Öberg; 3. Jesper Nelin; 4. Martin Ponsiluoma	Norway	
WCH	7 February 2024	(Czech Republic) Nové Město na Moravě	4 x 6 km	France: 1. Éric Perrot; 2. Quentin Fillon Maillet; 3. Justine Braisaz-Bouchet; 4. Julia Simon	Norway: 1. Tarjei Bø; 2. Johannes Thingnes Bø; 3. Karoline Offigstad Knotten; 4. Ingrid Landmark Tandrevold	Sweden: 1. Sebastian Samuelsson; 2. Martin Ponsiluoma; 3. Hanna Öberg; 4. Elvira Öberg	not included in the World Cup	
WCH	15 February 2024	(Czech Republic) Nové Město na Moravě	6 km + 7.5 km	France: 1. Quentin Fillon Maillet; 2. Lou Jeanmonnot	Italy: 1. Tommaso Giacomel; 2. Lisa Vittozzi	Norway: 1. Johannes Thingnes Bø; 2. Ingrid Landmark Tandrevold	not included in the World Cup	
5	3 March 2024	(Norway) Oslo Holmenkollen (7)	6 km + 7.5 km	Norway: 1. Juni Arnekleiv; 2. Vetle Sjåstad Christiansen	Sweden: 1. Anna Magnusson; 2. Sebastian Samuelsson	Finland: 1. Suvi Minkkinen; 2. Otto Invenius	Norway	
6	3 March 2024	(Norway) Oslo Holmenkollen (7)	4 x 6 km	France: 1. Julia Simon; 2. Sophie Chauveau; 3. Fabien Claude; 4. Quentin Fillon Maillet	Sweden: 1. Mona Brorsson; 2. Elvira Öberg; 3. Jesper Nelin; 4. Martin Ponsiluoma	Norway: 1. Ingrid Landmark Tandrevold; 2. Ida Lien; 3. Tarjei Bø; 4. Johannes Thingnes Bø	Norway	

=== Rankings ===
Rank	after 6 events	Points
1	Norway	465
2	France	366
3	Sweden	364
4	Germany	295
5	Italy	293

== Podium table by nation ==
Table showing the World Cup podium places (gold–1st place, silver–2nd place, bronze–3rd place) by the countries represented by the athletes.

Rank	Nation	Gold	Silver	Bronze	Total
1	Norway	28	22	21	71
2	France	16	10	13	39
3	Germany	5	10	9	24
4	Italy	4	5	5	14
5	Sweden	3	10	6	19
6	Switzerland	2	1	2	5
7	Austria	0	0	1	1
7	Finland	0	0	1	1
Totals (8 entries)		58	58	58	174

== Points distribution ==
The table shows the number of points won in the 2023–24 Biathlon World Cup for men and women. Relay events do not impact individual rankings.

Place	1	2	3	4	5	6	7	8	9	10	11	12	13	14	15	16	17	18	19	20	21	22	23	24	25	26	27	28	29	30	31	32	33	34	35	36	37	38	39	40
Individual	90	75	60	50	45	40	36	34	32	31	30	29	28	27	26	25	24	23	22	21	20	19	18	17	16	15	14	13	12	11	10	9	8	7	6	5	4	3	2	1
Sprint	90	75	60	50	45	40	36	34	32	31	30	29	28	27	26	25	24	23	22	21	20	19	18	17	16	15	14	13	12	11	10	9	8	7	6	5	4	3	2	1
Pursuit	90	75	60	50	45	40	36	34	32	31	30	29	28	27	26	25	24	23	22	21	20	19	18	17	16	15	14	13	12	11	10	9	8	7	6	5	4	3	2	1
Mass Start	90	75	60	50	45	40	36	34	32	31	30	29	28	27	26	25	24	23	22	21	20	18	16	14	12	10	8	6	4	2

== Achievements ==
First World Cup career victory

Men

- (Germany) Roman Rees (30), in his 8th season – Stage 1 Individual in Östersund
- (Germany) Philipp Nawrath (30), in his 8th season – Stage 1 Sprint in Östersund
- (Norway) Endre Strømsheim (26), in his 4th season – Stage 4 Pursuit in Oberhof
- (France) Éric Perrot (22), in his 4th season – Stage 8 Sprint in Soldier Hollow, Utah

Women

- (France) Lou Jeanmonnot (25), in her 4th season – Stage 1 Sprint in Östersund
- (Switzerland) Lena Häcki-Groß (28), in her 10th season – Stage 6 Short Individual in Antholz-Anterselva

First World Cup podium

Men

- (Germany) Philipp Nawrath (30), in his 8th season – Stage 1 Sprint in Östersund – 1st place
- (Germany) Justus Strelow (26), in his 4th season – Stage 1 Individual in Östersund – 2nd place
- (Norway) Endre Strømsheim (26), in his 4th season – Stage 3 Pursuit in Lenzerheide – 2nd place
- (Norway) Vebjørn Sørum (25), in his 2nd season – Stage 1 Sprint in Östersund – 3rd place
- (Sweden) Jesper Nelin (31), in his 9th season – Stage 7 Mass Start in Oslo Holmenkollen – 3rd place
- (Norway) Johan-Olav Botn (24), in his 1st season – Stage 8 Sprint in Soldier Hollow, Utah – 3rd place

Women

- (Germany) Janina Hettich-Walz (27), in her 6th season – Stage 9 Mass Start in Canmore – 2nd place
- (Norway) Juni Arnekleiv (24), in her 3rd season – Stage 1 Sprint in Östersund – 3rd place
- (Norway) Marit Ishol Skogan (25), in her 1st season – Stage 3 Pursuit in Lenzerheide – 3rd place
- (France) Sophie Chauveau (24), in her 2nd season – Stage 4 Sprint in Oberhof – 3rd place
- (Norway) Ida Lien (26), in her 5th season – Stage 7 Individual in Oslo Holmenkollen – 3rd place
- (France) Gilonne Guigonnat (25), in her 2nd season – Stage 9 Mass Start in Canmore – 3rd place

Team

Number of wins this season (in brackets are all-time wins)

Men

- (Norway) Johannes Thingnes Bø – 8 (76)
- (Norway) Sturla Holm Lægreid – 2 (12)
- (Germany) Benedikt Doll – 2 (6)
- (Norway) Vetle Sjåstad Christiansen – 2 (6)
- (Norway) Tarjei Bø – 1 (13)
- (Sweden) Sebastian Samuelsson – 1 (4)
- (Norway) Johannes Dale-Skjevdal – 1 (3)
- (Germany) Roman Rees – 1 (1)
- (Germany) Philipp Nawrath – 1 (1)
- (Norway) Endre Strømsheim – 1 (1)
- (France) Éric Perrot – 1 (1)

Women

- (France) Justine Braisaz-Bouchet – 5 (9)
- (Italy) Lisa Vittozzi – 4 (7)
- (France) Lou Jeanmonnot – 4 (4)
- (Norway) Ingrid Landmark Tandrevold – 3 (4)
- (France) Julia Simon – 2 (9)
- (Switzerland) Lena Häcki-Groß – 2 (2)
- (Sweden) Elvira Öberg – 1 (8)

== Retirements ==
The following notable biathletes, who competed in the World Cup, retire during or after the 2023–24 season:

Men

- (Lithuania) Linas Banys
- (Sweden) Oskar Brandt
- (Germany) Benedikt Doll
- (Germany) Matthias Dorfer
- (Russia) Matvey Eliseev
- (Sweden) Peppe Femling
- (Russia) Evgeniy Garanichev
- (Canada) Christian Gow
- (Canada) Trevor Kiers
- (Ukraine) Artem Pryma
- (Estonia) Raido Ränkel
- (Belarus) Raman Yaliotnau

Women

- (Ukraine) Ekaterina Bekh
- (Ukraine) Darya Blashko
- (Sweden) Mona Brorsson
- (Kazakhstan) Anastassiya Kondratyeva
- (Belarus) Iryna Leshchanka
- (Russia) Anna Niкulina
- (Sweden) Stina Nilsson
- (Finland) Daria Virolaynen
- (Switzerland) Flurina Volken
- (Russia) Ekaterina Yurlova-Percht

== See also ==
- 2023–24 Biathlon IBU Cup (as the second highest competition series of IBU)
- 2024 Biathlon World Championships
- 2024 IBU Open European Championships
- 2024 Winter Youth Olympics
- 2024 IBU Junior World Championships
- 2024 IBU Junior Open European Championships
