= Marit Ishol Skogan =

Norwegian biathlete (born 1998)

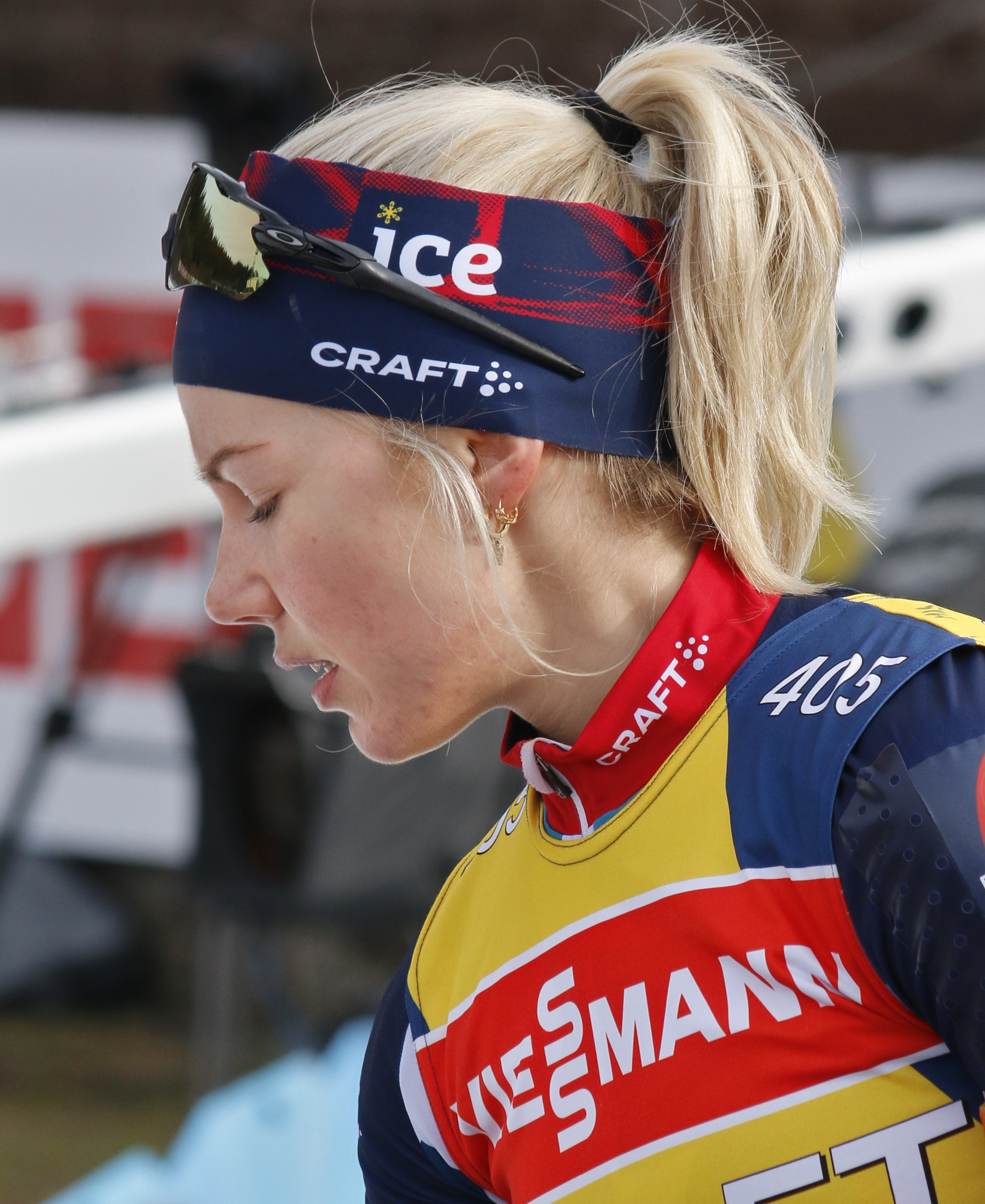
- Skogan in 2024

Personal information
- Nationality: Norwegian
- Born: 7 July 1998 (age 27) Steinkjer, Norway

Sport
- Country: Norway
- Sport: Biathlon
Medal record
Women's biathlon
Representing Norway
Youth World Championships
Silver medal – second place	2017 Brezno-Osrblie	3 × 6 km relay

Marit Ishol Skogan (born 7 July 1998) is a former Norwegian biathlete. She had competed in the Biathlon World Cup 2023-24.

== Career ==
Marit Ishol Skogan made her international debut at the 2017 Youth World Championships in Osrblie, Slovakia, where she won the silver medal in the relay alongside Marthe Kråkstad Johansen and Mari Wetterhus, finishing behind the Russian team. The following year, she competed in the older age categories at the YWC, achieving her best individual result with an 8th place in the sprint. In April 2018, the Norwegian won the gold medal in the relay at the National Championships, representing Nord-Trøndelag with Tonje Skjelstadås and Lotte Lie.

After participating in the Junior European Championships in 2019, Skogan's appearances in the next two seasons were limited to the Norwegian Cup and National Championships. In early 2022, she made her debut in the IBU Cup in Osrblie, achieving her best result with a 15th place in the sprint across three races.

At the season-opening races in Sjusjøen in November 2023, Skogan impressed so much that, despite having limited IBU Cup experience and not being part of the national team, she was nominated for the World Cup opener in Östersund. As the second-to-last starter, she hit 19 out of 20 targets and finished 10th in the individual race, placing immediately in the top 10 in her World Cup debut. Following two more top-20 finishes, the Norwegian earned her first relay appearance in Hochfilzen alongside Juni Arnekleiv, Karoline Knotten, and Ingrid Landmark Tandrevold, where they won the race outright.

The following week in Lenzerheide, she finished 6th in the sprint and improved by three positions in the pursuit, securing her first podium in an individual competition. While Skogan once again reached the podium with the relay in Oberhof, her performances in individual races declined. As a result, she was initially not nominated for the World Championships. However, due to Karoline Knotten's illness, Skogan participated in the individual race, finishing 68th out of 92 athletes. The competitive winter ended unsatisfactorily, and at her own request, she competed in several IBU Cup races at the end of the season, achieving a fifth place in Obertilliach.

In spring 2024, Skogan declined a spot on the Norwegian national team to continue training with the private Havland team.

== Biathlon results ==
All results are sourced from the International Biathlon Union.

=== World Championships ===
Event	Individual	Sprint	Pursuit	Mass start	Relay	Mixed relay	Single mixed relay
(Czech Republic) 2024 Nové Město	68th	—	—	—	—	—	—

=== World Cup ===
Season	Overall			Individual		Sprint		Pursuit		Mass start	
Season	Races	Points	Position	Points	Position	Points	Position	Points	Position	Points	Position
2023–24	15/21	214	30th	31	35th	71	30th	98	21st	14	41st

==== Individual podiums ====
No.	Season	Date	Location	Race	Place
1	2023–24	16 December 2023	(Switzerland) Lenzerheide	Pursuit	3rd

==== Relay podiums ====
No.	Season	Date	Location	Level	Race	Place	Teammate
1	2023–24	10 December 2023	(Austria) Hochfilzen	World Cup	Relay	1st	Arnekleiv, Knotten, Tandrevold
2	2023–24	7 January 2024	(Germany) Oberhof	World Cup	Relay	2nd	Arnekleiv, Knotten, Tandrevold

=== Youth and Junior World Championships ===
1 medal (1 silver)

Year	Age	Individual	Sprint	Pursuit	Relay
(Slovakia) 2017 Brezno-Osrblie	18	17th	27th	22nd	Silver
(Estonia) 2018 Otepää	19	—	8th	32nd	—
