= Juni Arnekleiv =

Norwegian biathlete (born 1999)

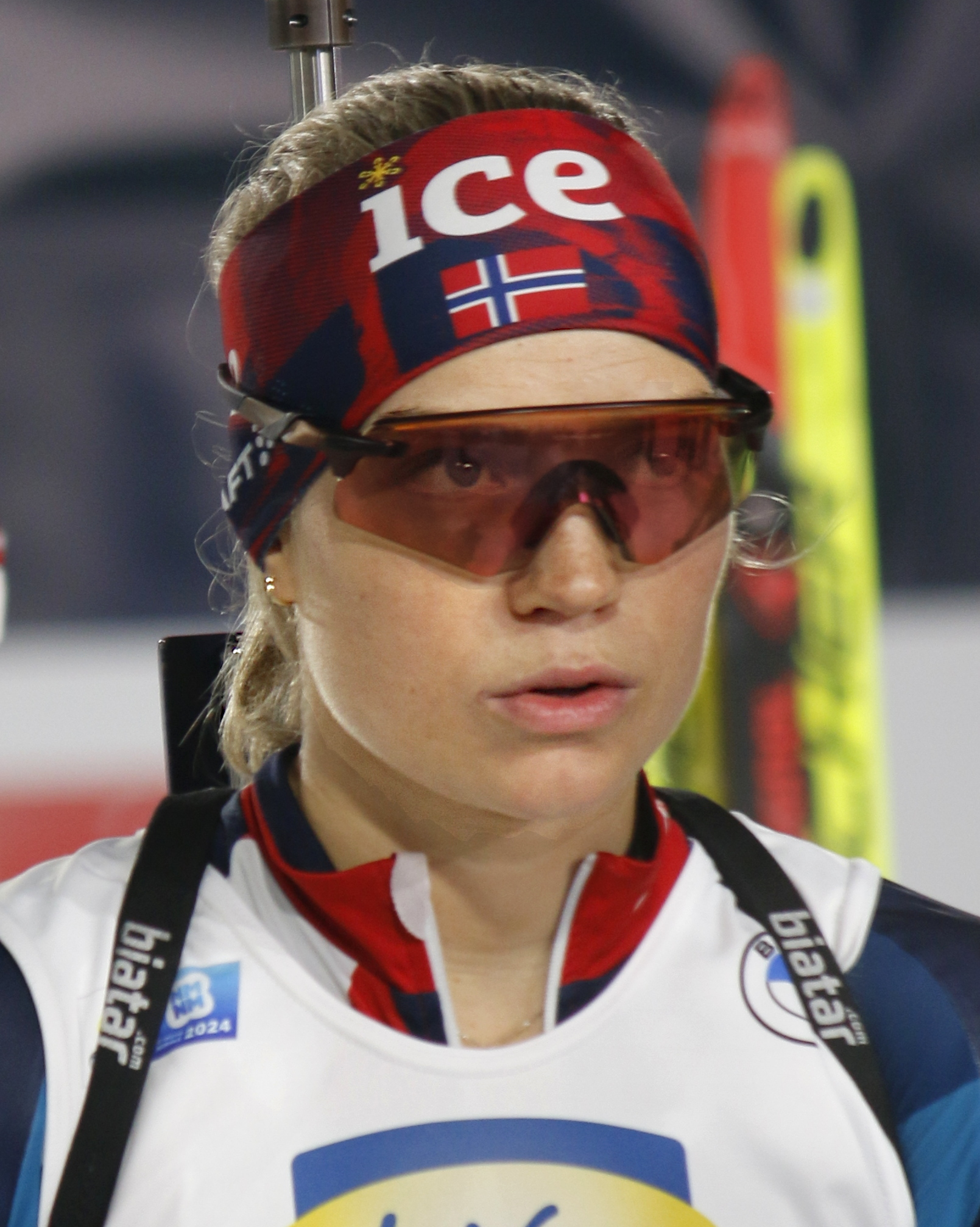
- Arnekleiv in 2024

Personal information
- Nationality: Norwegian
- Born: 17 February 1999 (age 27) Lillehammer, Norway
- Years active: 2012-present
- Height: 164 cm (5 ft 5 in)
- Weight: 58 kg (128 lb)

Sport
- Coached by: Sverre Huber Kaas; Patrick Oberegger

Professional information
- Sport: Biathlon
- Club: Dombås IL
- Skis: Salomon
- Rifle: Anschütz
- World Cup debut: 12 January 2022

World Championships
- Teams: 2 (2023-2024)
- Medals: 0 (0 gold)

World Cup
- Seasons: 4 (2021/22 - present)
- Individual races: 36
- All races: 50
- Individual victories: 0
- All victories: 6
- Individual podiums: 2
- All podiums: 12
- Overall titles: 0
- Discipline titles: 0
Medal record
Women's biathlon
Representing Norway
Olympic Games
Bronze medal – third place	2026 Milano Cortina	4 × 6 km relay
European Championships
Gold medal – first place	2023 Lenzerheide	Single Mixed relay
Bronze medal – third place	2026 Sjusjøen	4 × 6 km relay
Junior World Championships
Bronze medal – third place	2020 Lenzerheide	4 × 6 km relay
Bronze medal – third place	2021 Obertilliach	Sprint
Youth World Championships
Bronze medal – third place	2018 Otepää	3 × 6 km relay
- Updated on 18 February 2026

Juni Arnekleiv (born 17 February 1999) is a Norwegian biathlete. She has competed in the Biathlon World Cup since 2021.

== Personal life ==
Juni Arnekleiv was in a relationship with her teammate Sivert Guttorm Bakken until sometime in 2024.

== Biathlon results ==
All results are sourced from the International Biathlon Union.

=== World Championships ===
Event	Individual	Sprint	Pursuit	Mass start	Relay	Mixed relay	Single mixed relay
(Germany) 2023 Oberhof	79th	12th	13th	28th	—	—	—
(Czech Republic) 2024 Nové Město	29th	14th	31st	13th	10th	—	—

=== World Cup ===
==== Overall standings ====
Season	Age	Overall			Individual		Sprint		Pursuit		Mass start	
Season	Age	Races	Points	Position	Points	Position	Points	Position	Points	Position	Points	Position
2021–22	23	Didn't earn World Cup points										
2022–23	24	3/20	49	60th	27	34th	8	68th	—	—	14	40th
2023–24	25	19/21	492	13th	68	11th	126	17th	165	13th	133	8th
2024–25	26	7/21	53	65th	14	51st	12	68th	6	73rd	21	46th
2025–26	27	8/21	19	85th	—	—	—	—	19	62nd	—	—

==== Individual podiums ====
- 2 podiums

No.	Season	Date	Location	Level	Race	Place
1	2023–24	1 December 2023	(Sweden) Östersund	World Cup	Sprint	3rd
2	2023–24	14 January 2024	(Germany) Ruhpolding	World Cup	Pursuit	3rd

==== Relay podiums ====
- 6 victories
- 10 podiums

No.	Season	Date	Location	Level	Race	Place	Teammate(s)
1	2022–23	11 March 2023	(Sweden) Östersund	World Cup	Relay	1st	Lien, Tandrevold, Røiseland
2	2023–24	25 November 2023	(Sweden) Östersund	World Cup	Mixed Single Relay	2nd	Lægreid
3	2023–24	29 November 2023	(Sweden) Östersund	World Cup	Relay	1st	Johansen, Knotten, Tandrevold
4	2023–24	10 December 2023	(Austria) Hochfilzen	World Cup	Relay	1st	Skogan, Knotten, Tandrevold
5	2023–24	7 January 2024	(Germany) Oberhof	World Cup	Relay	2nd	Skogan, Knotten, Tandrevold
6	2023–24	20 January 2024	(Italy) Antholz-Anterselva	World Cup	Mixed Relay	1st	Knotten, T. Bø, J.T Bø
7	2023–24	3 March 2024	(Norway) Oslo Holmenkollen	World Cup	Single Mixed Relay	1st	Christiansen
8	2023–24	9 March 2024	(United States) Soldier Hollow	World Cup	Relay	1st	Lien, Knotten, Tandrevold
9	2024–25	1 December 2024	(Finland) Kontiolahti	World Cup	Relay	3rd	Knotten, Kirkeeide, Tandrevold
10	2024–25	18 January 2025	(Germany) Ruhpolding	World Cup	Relay	2nd	Knotten, Kirkeeide, Femsteinevik

=== Youth and Junior World Championships ===
3 medals (3 bronzes)

Year	Age	Individual	Sprint	Pursuit	Relay
(Estonia) 2018 Otepää	19	10th	18th	19th	Bronze
(Slovakia) 2019 Brezno-Osrblie	20	45th	31st	34th	5th
(Switzerland) 2020 Lenzerheide	21	34th	30th	27th	Bronze
(Austria) 2021 Obertilliach	22	37th	Bronze	9th	5th
