= Marthe Kråkstad Johansen =

Norwegian biathlete (born 1999)

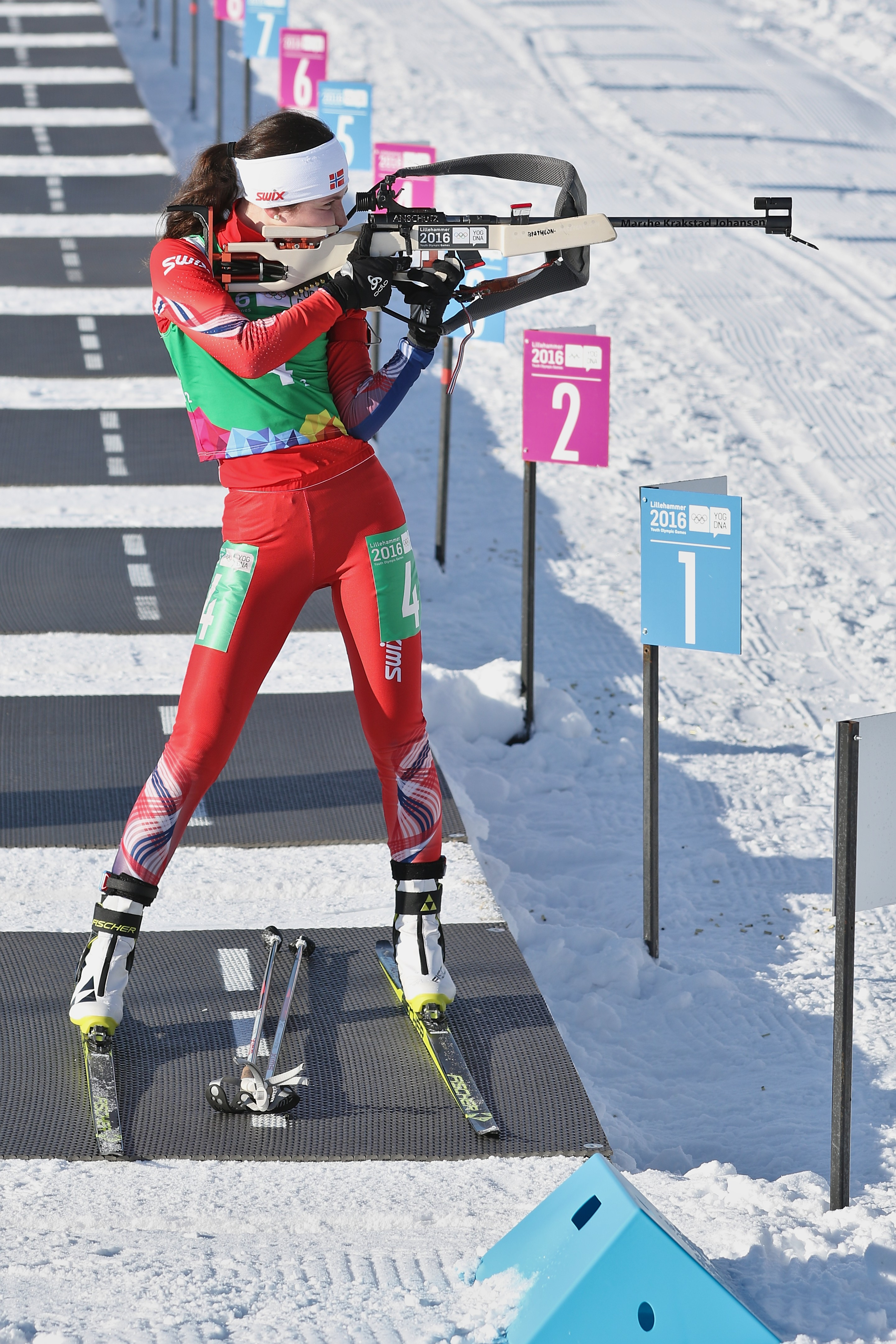
- Johansen in 2016

Personal information
- Nationality: Norwegian
- Born: 5 January 1999 (age 27) Mo i Rana, Norway
- Years active: 2015-present
- Height: 163 cm (5 ft 4 in)
- Weight: 53 kg (117 lb)

Sport
- Country: Norway
- Sport: Biathlon
- Coached by: Halvor Jørstad

Professional information
- Club: Bossmo og Ytteren IL
- World Cup debut: 18 March 2023

Olympic Games
- Teams: 1 (2026)
- Medals: 1

World Cup
- Seasons: 2023-present
- Individual races: 35
- All races: 45
- All victories: 1
- All podiums: 4
Medal record
Women's biathlon
Representing Norway
Olympic Games
Bronze medal – third place	2026 Milano Cortina	4 × 6 km relay
Winter Youth Olympics
Gold medal – first place	2016 Lillehammer	Mixed Relay
Junior World Championships
Bronze medal – third place	2020 Lenzerheide	4 × 6 km relay
Youth World Championships
Silver medal – second place	2017 Brezno-Osrblie	3 × 6 km relay
Bronze medal – third place	2018 Otepää	3 × 6 km relay
- Updated on 18 February 2026

Marthe Kråkstad Johansen (born 5 January 1999) is a Norwegian biathlete. She has competed in the Biathlon World Cup since 2022.

== Career ==
Marthe Kråkstad Johansen competed in her first international competitions at the 2016 Youth Olympic Games, where she won gold in the mixed relay with Marit Øygard, Fredrik Qvist Bucher-Johannessen, and Sivert Guttorm Bakken. She also earned three silver medals in the sprint, pursuit, and the single-mixed relay with Bucher-Johannessen. From 2017 to 2020, the Norwegian participated in youth and junior world championships, winning three relay medals. Her best individual result was a fifth place in the sprint at the 2020 Lenzerheide event. In 2020, she made her senior-level debut at the European Championships in Minsk-Raubitschy, finishing 26th in the pursuit. Johansen joined the B-national team for the following winter, competing in the IBU Cup and impressing with her shooting accuracy, achieving her first podium in February 2021. In the 2021/22 season, she improved further with four podium finishes, leading her to fourth place in the IBU Cup rankings. She also won a gold medal in the mass start at the Norwegian Championships.

Johansen excelled in the winter of 2022/23, winning both the sprint and pursuit at the IBU Cup opener in Idre. At the European Championships, her best result was 9th place in the individual event, while in the season finale in Canmore, Canada, she regained her form, winning the mass start 60 and pursuit. She also won the single-mixed relay with Martin Uldal. Following her successful season, she earned a spot in the World Cup final in Oslo, finishing 18th in the sprint without shooting errors. She successfully defended her national championship title. In the following season, Johansen was part of the World Cup roster from the beginning. Her first top-10 finish was eighth in the opening individual event in Östersund. Shortly after, she was the starting athlete in a World Cup relay for the first time, securing her first World Cup victory with Juni Arnekleiv, Karoline Offigstad Knotten, and Ingrid Landmark Tandrevold.

== Biathlon results ==
All results are sourced from the International Biathlon Union.

=== World Cup ===
==== Overall standings ====
Season	Age	Overall			Individual		Sprint		Pursuit		Mass start	
Season	Age	Races	Points	Position	Points	Position	Points	Position	Points	Position	Points	Position
2022–23	24	1/20	23	70th	—	—	23	59th	—	—	—	—
2023–24	25	11/21	181	34th	34	31st	86	26th	61	35th	—	—
2024–25	26	5/21	75	59th	17	49th	43	46th	15	56th	—	—
2025–26	27	18/21	325	20th	29	34th	65	37th	127	16th	104	13th

==== Relay podiums ====
- 1 victory
- 1 podium

No.	Season	Date	Location	Level	Race	Place	Teammate(s)
1	2023–24	29 November 2023	(Sweden) Östersund	World Cup	Relay	1st	Arnekleiv, Knotten, Tandrevold

=== Youth and Junior World Championships ===
3 medals (1 silver, 2 bronzes)

Year	Age	Individual	Sprint	Pursuit	Relay
(Slovakia) 2017 Brezno-Osrblie	18	25th	7th	9th	Silver
(Estonia) 2018 Otepää	19	26th	9th	6th	Bronze
(Slovakia) 2019 Brezno-Osrblie	20	—	18th	6th	—
(Switzerland) 2020 Lenzerheide	21	9th	5th	20th	Bronze
