= Sophie Chauveau =

French biathlete (born 1999)

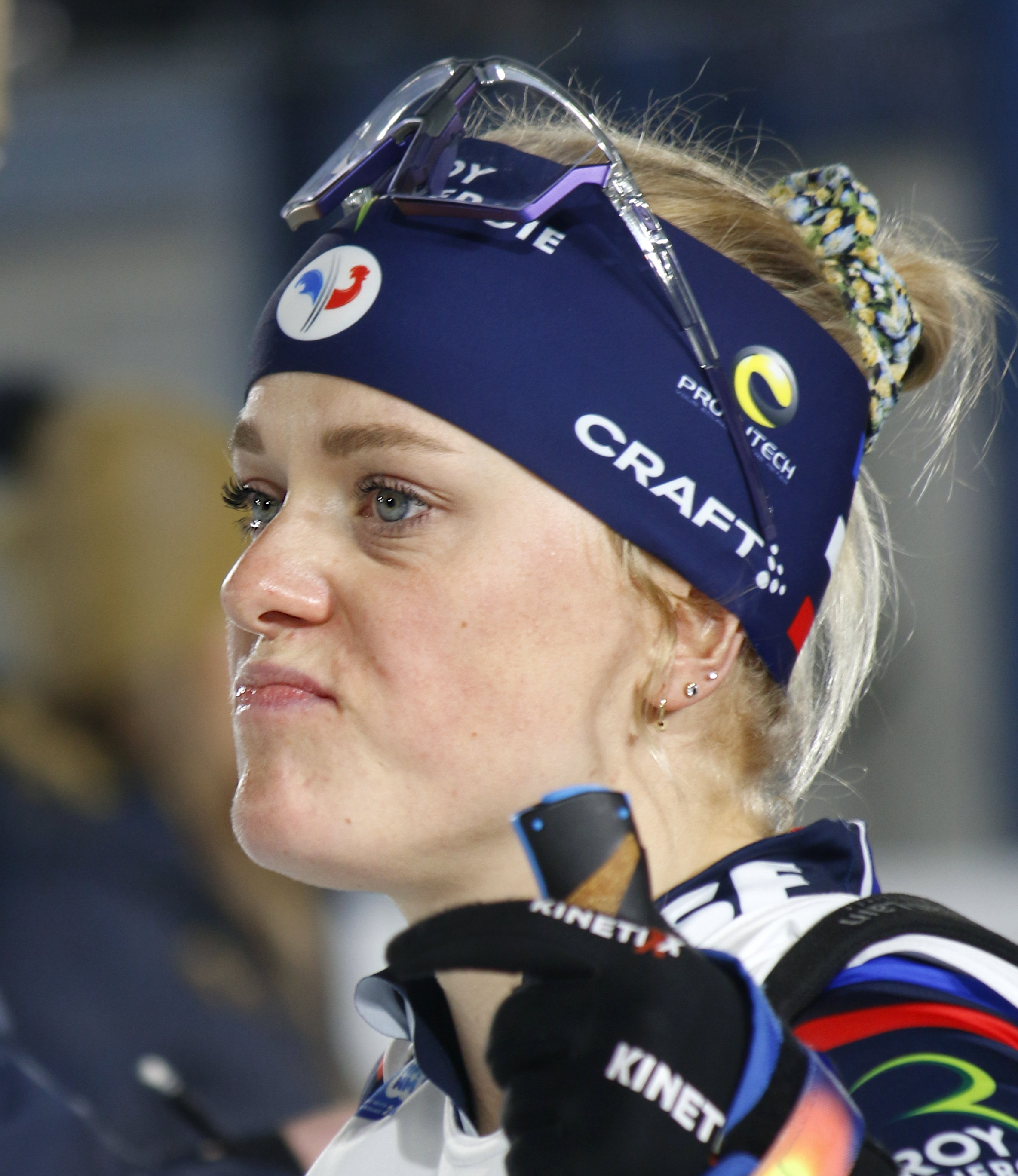
- Chauveau in 2024

Personal information
- Nationality: French
- Born: 12 June 1999 (age 27) Chêne-Bougeries, Switzerland

Sport

Professional information
- Sport: Biathlon
- Club: Le Grand Bornand
- IBU Cup debut: 2019
- World Cup debut: 2022

World Championships
- Teams: 2 (2023-2024)
- Medals: 1 (1 gold)

World Cup
- Seasons: 2 (2022/23-)
- All victories: 4

European/IBU Cup
- Seasons: 5 (2018/19-2022/23)
Medal record
Women's biathlon
Representing France
World Championships
| Gold medal – first place | 2024 Nové Město | 4 × 6 km relay |
European Championships
| Silver medal – second place | 2025 Val Martello | 4 × 6 km relay |
| Bronze medal – third place | 2026 Sjusjøen | 7.5 km sprint |
Junior World Championships
| Gold medal – first place | 2019 Osrblie | 3 × 6 km relay |
| Gold medal – first place | 2021 Obertilliach | 4 × 6 km relay |
| Bronze medal – third place | 2019 Osrblie | 10 km pursuit |

Sophie Chauveau (French pronunciation: [sɔfi ʃovo]; born 12 June 1999) is a French biathlete. She has competed in the Biathlon World Cup since 2022.

== Biathlon results ==
All results are sourced from the International Biathlon Union.

=== World Championships ===
1 medal (1 gold)

| Event | Individual | Sprint | Pursuit | Mass start | Relay | Mixed relay | Single mixed relay |
|---|---|---|---|---|---|---|---|
| (Germany) 2023 Oberhof | — | 27th | 9th | — | — | — | — |
| (Czech Republic) 2024 Nové Město | — | 4th | 4th | 18th | Gold | — | — |

=== World Cup ===
World Cup rankings

| Season | Overall | | Individual | | Sprint | | Pursuit | | Mass start | |
| Season | Points | Position | Points | Position | Points | Position | Points | Position | Points | Position |
|---|---|---|---|---|---|---|---|---|---|---|
| 2022–23 | - | 21st | - | 63rd | - | 22nd | - | 16th | - | 15th |
| 2023–24 | - | 20th | - | 22nd | - | 23rd | - | 27th | - | 10th |

Relay victories

4 victories

| No. | Season | Date | Location | Discipline | Level | Team |
|---|---|---|---|---|---|---|
| 1 | 2023–24 | 7 January 2024 | (Germany) Oberhof | Relay | Biathlon World Cup | Jeanmonnot / Braisaz / Chauveau / Simon |
| 2 | 2023–24 | 10 January 2024 | (Germany) Ruhpolding | Relay | Biathlon World Cup | Jeanmonnot / Richard / Chauveau / Simon |
| 3 | 2023–24 | 17 February 2024 | (Czech Republic) Nové Město | Relay | World Championships | Jeanmonnot / Chauveau / Braisaz / Simon |
| 4 | 2023–24 | 3 March 2024 | (Norway) Oslo Holmenkollen | Mixed Relay | Biathlon World Cup | Simon / Chauveau / Claude / Fillon Maillet |

=== Youth and Junior World Championships ===
3 medals (2 gold, 1 bronze)

| Year | Age | Individual | Sprint | Pursuit | Relay | Mixed relay |
|---|---|---|---|---|---|---|
| (Estonia) 2018 Otepaeae | 18 | 23th | 10th | 20nd | —N/a | —N/a |
| (Slovakia) 2019 Brezno-Osrblie | 19 | 29th | 5th | Bronze | Gold | —N/a |
| (Austria) 2021 Obertilliach | 21 | 33th | 10th | 22nd | Gold | —N/a |
