= Didier Bionaz =

Italian biathlete (born 2000)

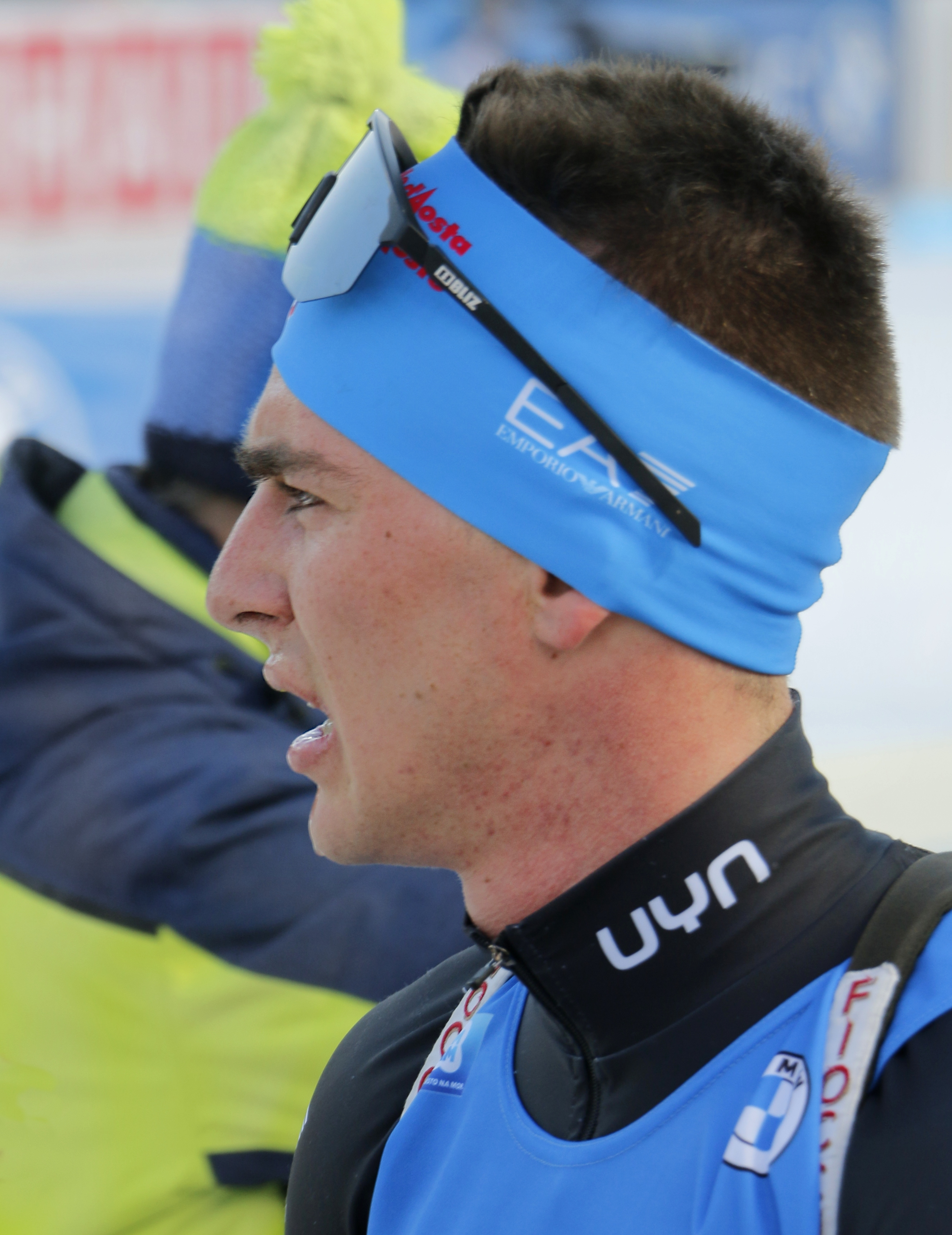
- Didier Bionaz (2023)

Personal information
- Nationality: Italian
- Born: 22 February 2000 (age 26) Aosta, Italy

Sport
- Country: Italy
- Sport: Biathlon
Medal record
Men's biathlon
Representing Italy
World Championships
| Silver medal – second place | 2023 Oberhof | Mixed relay |
Youth World Championships
| Bronze medal – third place | 2019 Osrblie | 3 × 7.5 km relay |

Didier Bionaz (born 22 February 2000) is an Italian biathlete. He has competed in the Biathlon World Cup since 2020.

== Career results ==
=== Olympic Games ===
0 medals

| Event | Individual | Sprint | Pursuit | Mass start | Relay | Mixed relay |
|---|---|---|---|---|---|---|
| (China) 2022 Beijing | 48th | – | – | – | – | – |

=== World Championships ===
1 medal (1 silver)

| Event | Individual | Sprint | Pursuit | Mass start | Relay | Mixed relay | Single mixed relay |
|---|---|---|---|---|---|---|---|
| (Slovenia) 2021 Pokljuka | 59th | 20th | 57th | – | 6th | 6th | – |
| (Germany) 2023 Oberhof | 26th | 66th | – | – | 7th | Silver | – |
| (Czech Republic) 2024 Nové Město na Moravě | 49th | 28th | 32nd | – | 6th | 10th | – |
| (Switzerland) 2025 Lenzerheide | 49th | 43rd | 49th | — | — | — | — |
