= Lou Jeanmonnot =

French biathlete (born 1998)

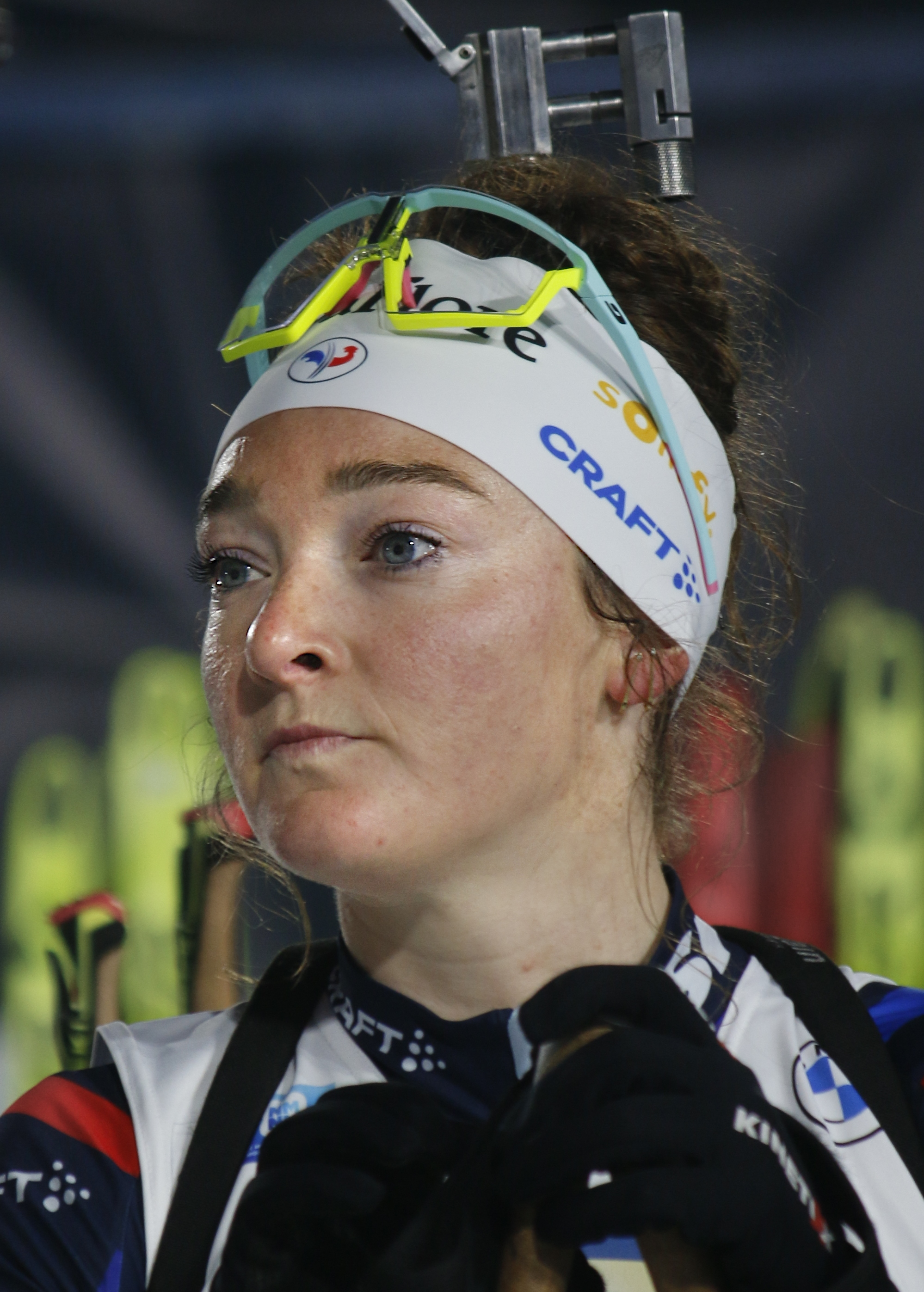
- Jeanmonnot in 2024

Personal information
- Nationality: French
- Born: 28 October 1998 (age 27) Pontarlier, France

Sport

Professional information
- Sport: Biathlon
- Club: Olympic Mont d'Or
- IBU Cup debut: 2018
- World Cup debut: 2021

Olympic Games
- Medals: (1 gold)

World Championships
- Teams: 3 (2023–2025)
- Medals: 7 (4 gold)

World Cup
- Seasons: 5 (2020/21–)
- Individual victories: 15
- All victories: 12
- Overall titles: 1 (2025/26)
- Discipline titles: 6: 1 Mass Start (2023-24); 2 Individual (2024-25, 2025-26); 2 Pursuit (2024-25, 2025-26); 1 Sprint (2025-26)

European/IBU Cup
- Seasons: 4 (2018/19–2021/22)
- Overall titles: 1 (2021/22)
- Discipline titles: 1: 1 Super Sprint (2021/22)
Medal record
Women's biathlon
Representing France
Event	1st	2nd	3rd
Olympic Games	2	1	1
World Championships	4	0	3
Total	6	1	4
Olympic Games
Gold medal – first place	2026 Milano Cortina	4 × 6 km relay
Gold medal – first place	2026 Milano Cortina	Mixed relay
Silver medal – second place	2026 Milano Cortina	15 km individual
Bronze medal – third place	2026 Milano Cortina	7.5 km sprint
World Championships
Gold medal – first place	2024 Nové Město	4 × 6 km relay
Gold medal – first place	2024 Nové Město	Single mixed relay
Gold medal – first place	2025 Lenzerheide	4 × 6 km relay
Gold medal – first place	2025 Lenzerheide	Mixed relay
Bronze medal – third place	2024 Nové Město	7.5 km sprint
Bronze medal – third place	2024 Nové Město	12.5 km mass start
Bronze medal – third place	2025 Lenzerheide	15 km individual
European Championships
Silver medal – second place	2022 Arber	Single mixed relay
Bronze medal – third place	2019 Minsk	Single mixed relay
Junior World Championships
Gold medal – first place	2018 Otepää	Relay
Gold medal – first place	2019 Osrblie	Relay
Youth Olympic Games
Bronze medal – third place	2016 Lillehammer	Pursuit
Youth World Championships
Gold medal – first place	2017 Osrblie	Individual
Silver medal – second place	2017 Osrblie	Pursuit

Lou Jeanmonnot-Laurent (French pronunciation: [lu ʒɑ̃mɔno]; born 28 October 1998) is a French biathlete. Her World Cup debut was in 2021 at Nové Město. She won a gold medal at the 2024 Biathlon World Championships in relay.

== Biathlon results ==
All results are sourced from the International Biathlon Union.

=== Olympic Games ===
4 medals (2 gold)

Event	Individual	Sprint	Pursuit	Mass start	Relay	Mixed relay
(Italy) 2026 Milano Cortina	Silver	Bronze	4th	16th	Gold	Gold

=== World Championships ===
7 medals (4 gold, 3 bronze)

Year	Individual	Sprint	Pursuit	Mass start	Relay	Mixed relay	Single mixed relay
(Germany) 2023 Oberhof	7th	26th	6th	15th	4th	—	5th
(Czech Republic) 2024 Nové Město	6th	Bronze	7th	Bronze	Gold	—	Gold
(Switzerland) 2025 Lenzerheide	Bronze	6th	4th	6th	Gold	Gold	—

=== World Cup ===
Season	Overall			Individual		Sprint		Pursuit		Mass start	
Season	Races	Points	Position	Points	Position	Points	Position	Points	Position	Points	Position
2020–21	6/26	32	72nd	—	—	11	77th	21	57th	—	—
2021–22	2/22	10	95th	—	—	—	—	10	69th	—	—
2022–23	20/20	593	11th	129	6th	158	15th	140	14th	166	5th
2023–24	19/21	1068	2nd	105	8th	333	4th	378	3rd	252	1st
2024–25	21/21	1258	2nd	221	1st	346	2nd	438	1st	253	3rd
2025–26	21/21	1135	1st	136	1st	421	1st	397	1st	181	4th

Individual podiums

- 15 victories (2 Ind, 3 Sp, 8 Pu, 2 MS)
- 36 podiums

No.	Season	Date	Location	Discipline	Level	Place
1	2022–23	12 January 2023	(Germany) Ruhpolding	15 km Individual	Biathlon World Cup	2nd
2	2022–23	12 March 2023	(Sweden) Östersund	12.5 km Mass Start	Biathlon World Cup	2nd
3	2023–24	1 December 2023	(Sweden) Östersund	7.5 km Sprint	Biathlon World Cup	1st
4	2023–24	3 December 2023	(Sweden) Östersund	10 km Pursuit	Biathlon World Cup	1st
5	2023–24	19 January 2024	(Italy) Antholz	12.5 km Short Individual	Biathlon World Cup	3rd
6	2023–24	21 January 2024	(Italy) Antholz	12.5 km Mass Start	Biathlon World Cup	2nd
7	2023–24	9 February 2024	(Czech Republic) Nové Město	7.5 km Sprint	Biathlon World Championships	3rd
8	2023–24	18 February 2024	(Czech Republic) Nové Město	12.5 km Mass Start	Biathlon World Championships	3rd
9	2023–24	2 March 2024	(Norway) Oslo	12.5 km Mass Start	Biathlon World Cup	3rd
10	2023–24	8 March 2024	(United States) Soldier Hollow	7.5 km Sprint	Biathlon World Cup	3rd
11	2023–24	10 March 2024	(United States) Soldier Hollow	10 km Pursuit	Biathlon World Cup	1st
12	2023–24	14 March 2024	(Canada) Canmore	7.5 km Sprint	Biathlon World Cup	2nd
13	2023–24	16 March 2024	(Canada) Canmore	10 km Pursuit	Biathlon World Cup	2nd
14	2023–24	17 March 2024	(Canada) Canmore	12.5 km Mass Start	Biathlon World Cup	1st
15	2024–25	4 December 2024	(Finland) Kontiolahti	12.5 km Short Individual	Biathlon World Cup	1st
16	2024–25	14 December 2024	(Austria) Hochfilzen	10 km Pursuit	Biathlon World Cup	1st
17	2024–25	11 January 2025	(Germany) Oberhof	10 km Pursuit	Biathlon World Cup	1st
18	2024–25	16 January 2025	(Germany) Ruhpolding	15 km Individual	Biathlon World Cup	1st
19	2024–25	23 January 2025	(Italy) Antholz	7.5 km Sprint	Biathlon World Cup	1st
20	2024–25	25 January 2025	(Italy) Antholz	10 km Pursuit	Biathlon World Cup	1st
21	2024–25	18 February 2025	(Switzerland) Lenzerheide	15 km Individual	Biathlon World Championships	3rd
22	2024–25	15 March 2025	(Slovenia) Pokljuka	12.5 km Mass Start	Biathlon World Cup	1st
23	2024–25	21 March 2025	(Norway) Oslo	7.5 km Sprint	Biathlon World Cup	2nd
24	2024–25	22 March 2025	(Norway) Oslo	10 km Pursuit	Biathlon World Cup	1st
25	2024–25	23 March 2025	(Norway) Oslo	12.5 km Mass Start	Biathlon World Cup	3rd
26	2025–26	12 December 2025	(Austria) Hochfilzen	7.5 km Sprint	Biathlon World Cup	1st
27	2025–26	18 December 2025	(France) Annecy	7.5 km Sprint	Biathlon World Cup	2nd
28	2025–26	20 December 2025	(France) Annecy	10 km Pursuit	Biathlon World Cup	1st
29	2025–26	21 December 2025	(France) Annecy	12.5 km Mass Start	Biathlon World Cup	2nd
30	2025–26	16 January 2026	(Germany) Ruhpolding	7.5 km Sprint	Biathlon World Cup	2nd
31	2025–26	18 January 2026	(Germany) Ruhpolding	10 km Pursuit	Biathlon World Cup	1st
32	2025–26	23 January 2026	(Czech Republic) Nové Město	12.5 km Short Individual	Biathlon World Cup	2nd
33	2025–26	11 February 2026	(Italy) Antholz	15 km Individual	Olympic Games	2nd
34	2025–26	14 February 2026	(Italy) Antholz	7.5 km Sprint	Olympic Games	3rd
35	2025–26	13 March 2026	(Estonia) Otepää	7.5 km Sprint	Biathlon World Cup	3rd
36	2025–26	14 March 2026	(Estonia) Otepää	10 km Pursuit	Biathlon World Cup	3rd

Relay victories

12 victories

No.	Season	Date	Location	Discipline	Level	Team
1	2022–23	11 December 2022	(Austria) Hochfilzen	Relay	Biathlon World Cup	Jeanmonnot / Chevalier / C.Chevalier / Simon
2	2022–23	22 January 2023	(Italy) Antholz-Anterselva	Relay	Biathlon World Cup	Jeanmonnot / Chevalier / C.Chevalier / Simon
3	2022–23	5 March 2023	(Czech Republic) Nové Město	Mixed Relay	Biathlon World Cup	Jeanmonnot / Colombo / Perrot / Claude
4	2023–24	25 November 2023	(Sweden) Östersund	Mixed Relay	Biathlon World Cup	Fillon Maillet / Jacquelin / Braisaz / Jeanmonnot
5	2023–24	7 January 2024	(Germany) Oberhof	Relay	Biathlon World Cup	Jeanmonnot / Braisaz / Chauveau / Simon
6	2023–24	10 January 2024	(Germany) Ruhpolding	Relay	Biathlon World Cup	Jeanmonnot / Richard / Chauveau / Simon
7	2023–24	15 February 2024	(Czech Republic) Nové Město	Single Mixed Relay	World Championships	Fillon Maillet / Jeanmonnot
8	2023–24	17 February 2024	(Czech Republic) Nové Město	Relay	World Championships	Jeanmonnot / Chauveau / Braisaz / Simon
9	2024–25	9 March 2025	(Czech Republic) Nové Město	Relay	Biathlon World Cup	Jeanmonnot / Michelon / Braisaz-Bouchet / Simon
10	2025–26	29 November 2025	(Sweden) Östersund	Relay	Biathlon World Cup	Richard / Michelon / Braisaz-Bouchet / Jeanmonnot
11	2025–26	30 November 2025	(Sweden) Östersund	Mixed Relay	Biathlon World Cup	Jacquelin / Perrot / Braisaz-Bouchet / Jeanmonnot
12	2025–26	10 January 2026	(Germany) Oberhof	Relay	Biathlon World Cup	Jeanmonnot / Michelon / Braisaz-Bouchet / Simon
