= Philipp Nawrath =

German biathlete (born 1993)

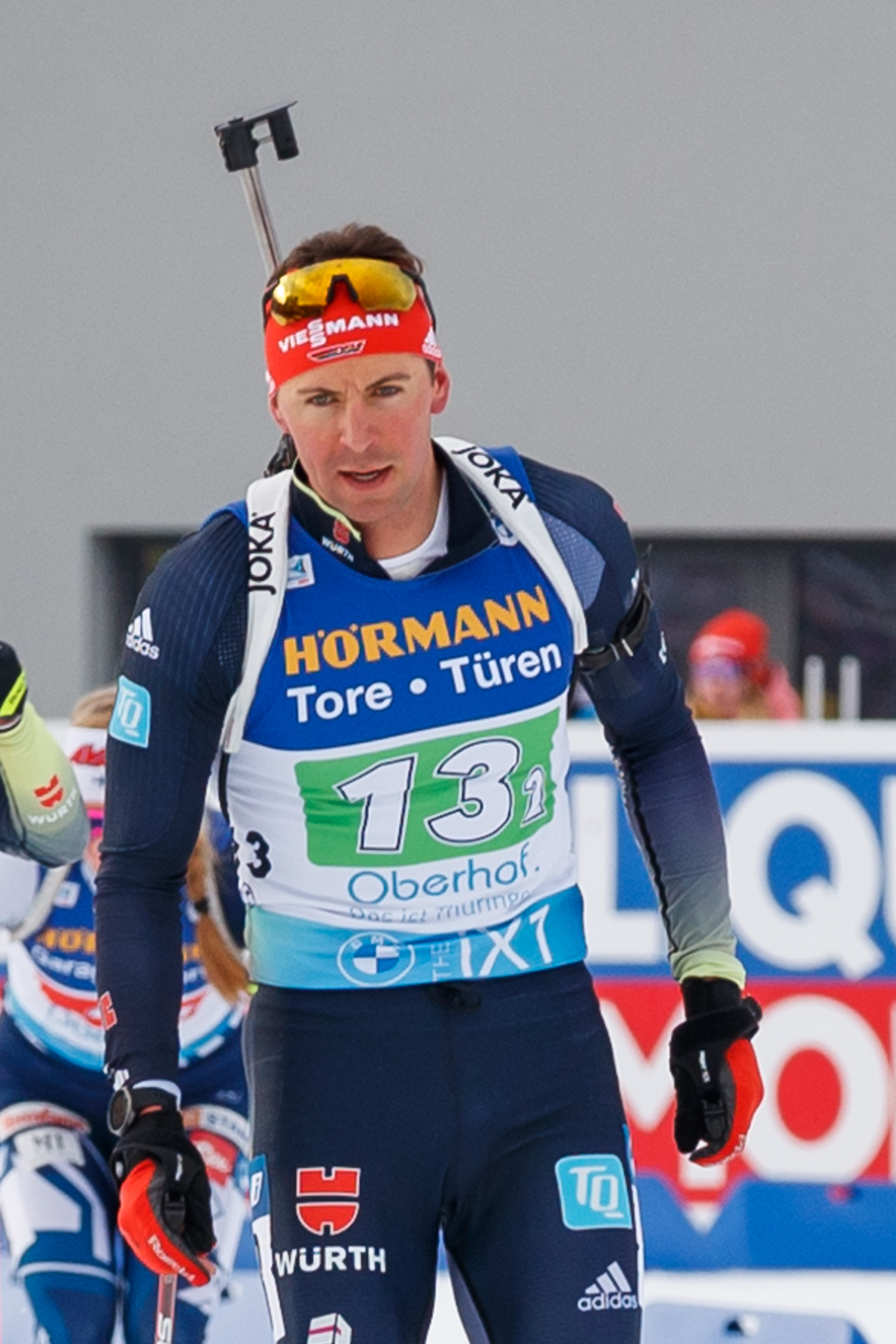
- Nawrath in 2023

Personal information
- Nationality: German
- Born: 13 February 1993 (age 33) Füssen, Germany
- Height: 1.82 m (6 ft 0 in)
- Weight: 78 kg (172 lb)

Sport

Professional information
- Sport: Biathlon
- Club: SK Nesselwang
- World Cup debut: 2017

Olympic Games
- Teams: 2 (2022)–(2026)
- Medals: 0

World Championships
- Teams: 5 (2019, 2020, 2023–2025)
- Medals: 2

World Cup
- Seasons: 8 (2016/17–)
- Individual victories: 1
- All victories: 2
- Individual podiums: 7
- All podiums: 15
- Overall titles: 0
- Discipline titles: 0
Medal record
Men's biathlon
Representing Germany
Olympic Games
Bronze medal – third place	2026 Milano Cortina	Mixed relay
World Championships
Bronze medal – third place	2025 Lenzerheide	4 × 7.5 km relay
Bronze medal – third place	2025 Lenzerheide	Mixed relay
European Championships
Silver medal – second place	2021 Duszniki-Zdrój	Mixed relay
Bronze medal – third place	2023 Lenzerheide	10 km sprint

Philipp Nawrath (born 13 February 1993) is a German biathlete. He competed at the Biathlon World Championships 2019.

== Biathlon results ==
All results are sourced from the International Biathlon Union.

=== Olympic Games ===
Event	Individual	Sprint	Pursuit	Mass start	Relay	Mixed relay
(China) 2022 Beijing	–	22nd	19th	23rd	4th	5th
(Italy) 2026 Milano Cortina	5th	26th	25th	7th	4th	Bronze

=== World Championships ===
2 medals (2 bronze)

Event	Individual	Sprint	Pursuit	Mass start	Relay	Mixed relay	Single mixed relay
(Sweden) 2019 Östersund	—	12th	21st	15th	—	—	—
(Italy) 2020 Antholz	47th	—	—	—	—	—	—
(Germany) 2023 Oberhof	9th	—	—	—	—	—	6th
(Czech Republic) 2024 Nové Město	—	16th	—	10th	4th	5th	—
(Switzerland) 2025 Lenzerheide	—	18th	44th	16th	Bronze	Bronze	—

=== World Cup ===
World Cup rankings

Season	Overall	Individual	Sprint	Pursuit	Mass start
2016–17	95th	—	80th	—	—
2017–18	60th	—	56th	62nd	—
2018–19	33rd	43rd	28th	44th	26th
2019–20	38th	24th	52nd	44th	37th
2020–21	67th	—	—	48th	—
2021–22	18th	—	15th	19th	16th
2022–23	28th	12th	31st	28th	28th
2023–24	15th	41st	6th	12th	14th
2024–25	14th	29th	10th	12th	13th
2025–26	9th	9th	5th	14th	9th

==== Individual podiums ====
No.	Season	Date	Location	Level	Race	Place
1	2023–24	2 December 2023	(Sweden) Östersund	World Cup	Sprint	1st
2	2023–24	3 December 2023	(Sweden) Östersund	World Cup	Pursuit	2nd
3	2023–24	15 December 2023	(Switzerland) Lenzerheide	World Cup	Sprint	3rd
4	2024–25	6 December 2024	(Finland) Kontiolahti	World Cup	Sprint	3rd
5	2025–26	8 January 2026	(Germany) Oberhof	World Cup	Sprint	2nd
6	2025–26	12 March 2026	(Estonia) Otepää	World Cup	Sprint	3rd
7	2025–26	22 March 2026	(Norway) Oslo Holmenkollen	World Cup	Mass Start	2nd

*During Olympic seasons competitions are only held for those events not included in the Olympic program.
**The single mixed relay was added as an event in 2019.
