= Karoline Offigstad Knotten =

Norwegian biathlete (born 1995)

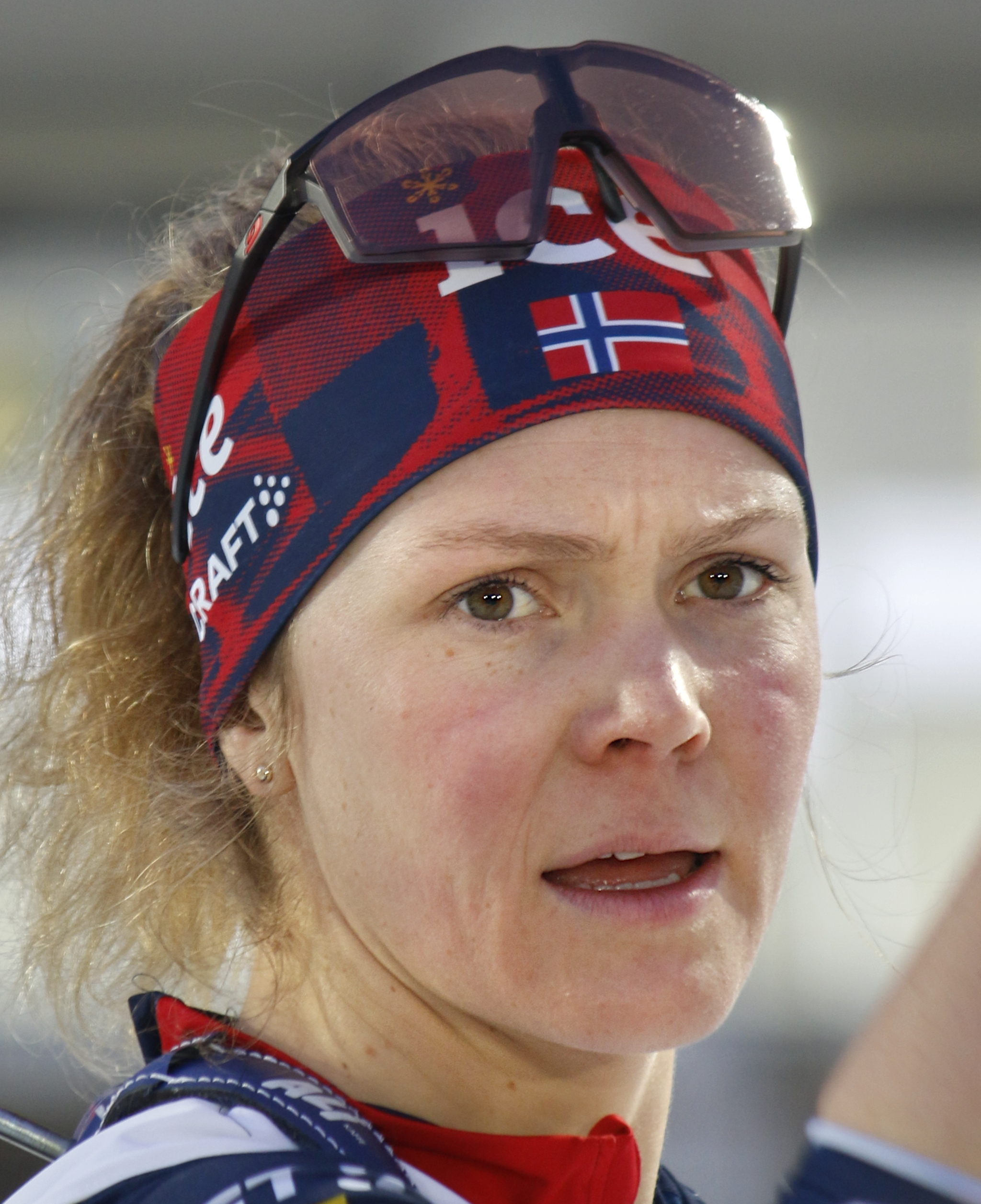
- Offigstad Knotten in 2024

Personal information
- Nationality: Norwegian
- Born: 6 January 1995 (age 31) Tromsø, Norway
- Years active: 2014-present
- Height: 1.81 m (5 ft 11 in)

Sport
- Coached by: Sverre Huber Kaas; Patrick Oberegger

Professional information
- Sport: Biathlon
- Club: Vingrom IL; Lillehammer SK
- Skis: Fischer
- Rifle: Anschütz
- World Cup debut: 8 December 2018

Olympic Games
- Teams: 2 (2022, 2026)
- Medals: 1 (0 gold)

World Championships
- Teams: 4 (2021-2025)
- Medals: 2 (0 gold)

World Cup
- Seasons: 7 (2018/2019–present)
- Individual races: 119
- All races: 156
- Individual victories: 0
- All victories: 12
- Individual podiums: 4
- All podiums: 26
- Overall titles: 0
- Discipline titles: 0
Medal record
Women's biathlon
Representing Norway
Olympic Games
Bronze medal – third place	2026 Milano Cortina	4 × 6 km relay
World Championships
Silver medal – second place	2024 Nové Město	Mixed relay
Silver medal – second place	2025 Lenzerheide	4 × 6 km relay
- Updated on 9 March 2025

Karoline Offigstad Knotten (born 6 January 1995) is a Norwegian biathlete. She has competed in the Biathlon World Cup since 2018, and represented Norway at the Biathlon World Championships 2020 and the 2022 Winter Olympics.

== Personal life ==
Karoline Offigstad Knotten is in a relationship with German biathlete Philipp Nawrath.

== Biathlon results ==
All results are sourced from the International Biathlon Union.

=== Olympic Games ===
1 medal (1 bronze)

Event	Individual	Sprint	Pursuit	Mass start	Relay	Mixed relay
(China) 2022 Beijing	—	—	—	—	4th	—
(Italy) 2026 Milano Cortina	25th	14th	15th	8th	3rd	4th

=== World Championships ===
2 medals (2 silver)

Event	Individual	Sprint	Pursuit	Mass start	Relay	Mixed relay	Single mixed relay
(Italy) 2020 Antholz-Anterselva	—	75th	—	—	—	—	—
(Slovenia) 2021 Pokljuka	—	41st	42nd	—	—	—	—
(Germany) 2023 Oberhof	21st	37th	17th	6th	6th	—	—
(Czech Republic) 2024 Nové Město	—	33rd	—	19th	10th	2nd	—
(Switzerland) 2025 Lenzerheide	—	44th	51st	—	2nd	—	—

=== World Cup ===
==== Individual podiums ====
- 4 podiums

No.	Season	Date	Location	Level	Race	Place
1	2020–21	29 November 2020	(Finland) Kontiolahti	World Cup	Sprint	3rd
2	2021–22	11 March 2022	(Estonia) Otepää	World Cup	Sprint	3rd
3	2023–24	1 December 2023	(Sweden) Östersund	World Cup	Sprint	2nd
4	2024–25	13 December 2024	(Austria) Hochfilzen	World Cup	Sprint	3rd
