= Biathlon World Championships 2024 =

Event held in Nové Město na Moravě, Czech Republic

- Host city: Nové Město na Moravě
- Country: Czech Republic
- Nations: 33
- Sport: Biathlon
- Events: 12
- Opening: 7 February
- Closing: 18 February
- Main venue: Vysočina Arena

The 2024 Biathlon World Championships took place from 7 to 18 February 2024 at the Vysočina Arena in Nové Město na Moravě, Czech Republic. After 2013, the championship was held for the second time in this location.

The event was the highlight of the 2023–24 Biathlon World Cup, but was not included in its rankings (except for the national rankings). A total of 12 events were held: sprint, pursuit, individual, mass start and relay races for both men, women, single mixed relay and a mixed relay.

The decision to choose Nové Město na Moravě as the host of the Championships was announced on 15 November 2020.

== Schedule ==
All times are local (UTC+1).

Date	Time	Event
7 February	17:20	4 × 6 km M+W mixed relay
9 February	17:20	Women's 7.5 km sprint
10 February	17:05	Men's 10 km sprint
11 February	14:30	Women's 10 km pursuit
11 February	17:05	Men's 12.5 km pursuit
13 February	17:10	Women's 15 km individual
14 February	17:20	Men's 20 km individual
15 February	18:00	6 km M + 7.5 km W single mixed relay
17 February	13:45	Women's 4 × 6 km relay
17 February	16:30	Men's 4 × 7.5 km relay
18 February	14:15	Women's 12.5 km mass start
18 February	16:30	Men's 15 km mass start

== Medal summary ==
=== Medal table ===
* Host nation (Czech Republic)

Rank	Nation	Gold	Silver	Bronze	Total
1	France	6	1	6	13
2	Norway	4	5	3	12
3	Italy	1	3	0	4
4	Sweden	1	1	1	3
5	Germany	0	1	2	3
6	Latvia	0	1	0	1
Totals (6 entries)		12	12	12	36

=== Men ===
Event	Gold		Silver		Bronze	
10 km sprint	Sturla Holm Lægreid; Norway	25:23.9 (0+0)	Johannes Thingnes Bø; Norway	25:27.4 (1+0)	Vetle Sjåstad Christiansen; Norway	25:42.5 (1+0)
12.5 km pursuit	Johannes Thingnes Bø; Norway	32:36.9 (1+2+0+0)	Sturla Holm Lægreid; Norway	33:05.6 (2+0+0+0)	Vetle Sjåstad Christiansen; Norway	33:15.4 (0+0+1+2)
20 km individual	Johannes Thingnes Bø; Norway	45:49.0 (1+0+0+0)	Tarjei Bø; Norway	46:47.9 (0+1+0+0)	Benedikt Doll; Germany	47:42.3 (0+0+0+1)
15 km mass start	Johannes Thingnes Bø; Norway	34:50.2 (1+0+0+0)	Andrejs Rastorgujevs; Latvia	35:05.3 (0+0+0+0)	Quentin Fillon Maillet; France	35:23.2 (0+0+1+0)
4 × 7.5 km relay	Sweden; Viktor Brandt; Jesper Nelin; Martin Ponsiluoma; Sebastian Samuelsson	1:16:22.6 (0+0) (0+2) (0+0) (0+2) (0+2) (0+1) (0+2) (0+0)	Norway; Sturla Holm Lægreid; Tarjei Bø; Johannes Thingnes Bø; Vetle Sjåstad Christiansen	1:16:34.4 (0+1) (1+3) (0+0) (0+2) (0+2) (0+0) (0+0) (3+3)	France; Éric Perrot; Fabien Claude; Émilien Jacquelin; Quentin Fillon Maillet	1:16:35.4 (0+3) (1+3) (2+3) (0+0) (0+1) (0+2) (0+0) (0+1)

=== Women ===
Event	Gold		Silver		Bronze	
7.5 km sprint	Julia Simon; France	20:07.5 (0+0)	Justine Braisaz-Bouchet; France	20:12.4 (1+0)	Lou Jeanmonnot; France	20:48.3 (0+1)
10 km pursuit	Julia Simon; France	29:54.8 (0+1+0+0)	Lisa Vittozzi; Italy	30:41.1 (0+0+0+1)	Justine Braisaz-Bouchet; France	30:44.1 (0+1+2+1)
15 km individual	Lisa Vittozzi; Italy	40:02.9 (0+0+0+0)	Janina Hettich-Walz; Germany	40:23.4 (0+0+0+0)	Julia Simon; France	40:32.5 (0+0+0+1)
12.5 km mass start	Justine Braisaz-Bouchet; France	34:37.2 (0+0+0+0)	Lisa Vittozzi; Italy	35:08.4 (0+0+0+0)	Lou Jeanmonnot; France	35:33.9 (1+0+0+0)
4 × 6 km relay	France; Lou Jeanmonnot; Sophie Chauveau; Justine Braisaz-Bouchet; Julia Simon	1:15:00.8 (0+0) (0+0) (1+3) (1+3) (0+0) (0+1) (0+1) (0+3)	Sweden; Anna Magnusson; Linn Persson; Hanna Öberg; Elvira Öberg	1:15:39.1 (0+0) (0+2) (0+1) (0+3) (0+1) (0+2) (0+0) (1+3)	Germany; Janina Hettich-Walz; Selina Grotian; Vanessa Voigt; Sophia Schneider	1:16:15.0 (0+0) (0+0) (0+3) (0+0) (0+1) (0+1) (0+1) (0+3)

=== Mixed ===
Event	Gold		Silver		Bronze	
4 × 6 km M+W relay	France; Éric Perrot; Quentin Fillon Maillet; Justine Braisaz-Bouchet; Julia Simon	1:09:24.4 (0+3) (0+0) (0+1) (0+1) (1+3) (0+1) (0+0) (0+0)	Norway; Tarjei Bø; Johannes Thingnes Bø; Karoline Offigstad Knotten; Ingrid Landmark Tandrevold	1:10:09.6 (0+0) (0+2) (0+1) (0+3) (0+0) (0+0) (0+1) (0+1)	Sweden; Sebastian Samuelsson; Martin Ponsiluoma; Hanna Öberg; Elvira Öberg	1:10:26.1 (0+2) (0+3) (0+1) (0+0) (0+2) (0+0) (0+0) (0+2)
6 km M + 7.5 km W single relay	France; Quentin Fillon Maillet; Lou Jeanmonnot	36:21.7 (0+0) (0+0) (0+0) (0+0) (0+0) (0+2) (0+0) (0+1)	Italy; Tommaso Giacomel; Lisa Vittozzi	36:46.3 (0+2) (0+2) (0+0) (0+0) (0+0) (0+0) (0+1) (0+0)	Norway; Johannes Thingnes Bø; Ingrid Landmark Tandrevold	36:49.1 (0+1) (0+1) (0+0) (0+0) (0+0) (0+2) (0+0) (1+3)
