= 2024–25 Biathlon IBU Cup =

Biathlon series

Discipline	Men	Women
Overall	(Norway) Isak Frey	(France) Camille Bened
U23	(Norway) Isak Frey	(France) Voldiya Galmace Paulin
Individual	(Norway) Isak Frey	(France) Voldiya Galmace Paulin
Sprint	(Norway) Isak Frey	(France) Paula Botet
Pursuit	(Norway) Isak Frey	(France) Camille Bened
Mass start	(Norway) Johan-Olav Botn	(France) Camille Bened
Relay	Norway	Norway
Nations Cup	Norway	France

Competition
Edition	17th	17th
Locations	8	8
Individual	24	24
Relay/Team	1	1
Mixed	6	6

The 2024–25 Biathlon IBU Cup, organised by the International Biathlon Union (IBU), was the 17th official IBU Cup season for men and women as the second level of international biathlon competitions.

The season started on 28 November 2024 in Idre Fjäll, Sweden and concluded on 15 March 2025 in Otepää, Estonia.

A major highlight of the season was the 2025 IBU Open European Championships held in Martell-Val Martello, Italy, which results also counted toward the IBU Cup rankings.

Mats Øverby from Norway (men's) and Océane Michelon from France (women's) were the reigning champions from the previous season.

Isak Frey from Norway and Camille Bened from France became the new overall champions. Their victories earned the Norwegian and French national teams the right to field an additional athlete in the World Cup events in Östersund and Hochfilzen during the 2025–26 season.

== Map of IBU Cup hosts ==
(Sweden) Idre Fjäll	(Norway) Geilo	(Austria) Obertilliach	(Germany) Arber
(Slovakia) Brezno-Osrblie	(Italy) Martell-Val Martello	(Italy) Ridnaun-Val Ridanna	(Estonia) Otepää
Europe Location of all 8 IBU Cup hosts of the season

== Calendar ==
Stage	Location	Date	Individual / Short individual	Sprint	Pursuit	Mass start	Relay	Mixed relay	Single mixed relay	Details
1	(Sweden) Idre Fjäll	28 November–1 December		●●	●					
2	(Norway) Geilo	4–7 December	●	●	●					relocated from Sjusjøen
3	(Austria) Obertilliach	19–22 December		●		●		●	●	
4	(Germany) Arber	9–12 January		●●	●					
5	(Slovakia) Brezno-Osrblie	15–18 January	●	●				●	●	
ECH	(Italy) Martell-Val Martello	29 January–2 February	●	●	●		●			European Championships
6	(Italy) Ridnaun-Val Ridanna	5–8 February		●	●	●				
7	(Estonia) Otepää	6–9 March		●	●	●				
8	(Estonia) Otepää	12–15 March	●	●				●	●	
Total: 70 (31 men's, 31 women's, 6 mixed)			4	11	6	3	1	3	3	

== Men ==
=== Calendar ===
Key: IND – Individual / SIND – Short Individual / SPR – Sprint / PUR – Pursuit / MSS – Mass Start
No.	Date	Place (In brackets Stage)	Discipline	Winner	Second	Third	R.
1	28 November 2024	(Sweden) Idre Fjäll (1)	10 km SPR	(Norway) Sverre Dahlen Aspenes	(Norway) Martin Uldal	(France) Antonin Guigonnat	
2	30 November 2024	(Sweden) Idre Fjäll (1)	10 km SPR	(Norway) Isak Frey	(Norway) Johan-Olav Botn	(Norway) Martin Uldal	
3	1 December 2024	(Sweden) Idre Fjäll (1)	12.5 km PUR	(Norway) Isak Frey	(Norway) Johan-Olav Botn	(Norway) Martin Uldal	
4	4 December 2024	(Norway) Geilo (2)	20 km IND	(Norway) Isak Frey	(Norway) Johan-Olav Botn	(Germany) Simon Kaiser	
5	6 December 2024	(Norway) Geilo (2)	10 km SPR	(Norway) Martin Uldal	(Norway) Johan-Olav Botn	(Norway) Sverre Dahlen Aspenes	
6	7 December 2024	(Norway) Geilo (2)	12.5 km PUR	(Norway) Martin Uldal	(Norway) Johan-Olav Botn	(Norway) Sverre Dahlen Aspenes	
7	19 December 2024	(Austria) Obertilliach (3)	10 km SPR	(Norway) Johannes Dale-Skjevdal	(Norway) Johan-Olav Botn	(Norway) Sivert Guttorm Bakken	
8	21 December 2024	(Austria) Obertilliach (3)	15 km MSS 60	(Norway) Johan-Olav Botn	(Norway) Isak Frey	(Norway) Johannes Dale-Skjevdal	
9	9 January 2025	(Germany) Arber (4)	10 km SPR	(Norway) Johannes Dale-Skjevdal	(Norway) Sivert Guttorm Bakken	(Norway) Sverre Dahlen Aspenes	
10	11 January 2025	(Germany) Arber (4)	10 km SPR	(Norway) Johannes Dale-Skjevdal	(Norway) Isak Frey	(Germany) Roman Rees	
11	12 January 2025	(Germany) Arber (4)	12.5 km PUR	(Norway) Johannes Dale-Skjevdal	(Norway) Isak Frey	(Germany) David Zobel	
12	15 January 2025	(Slovakia) Brezno-Osrblie (5)	15 km SIND	(Norway) Sivert Guttorm Bakken	(Norway) Sverre Dahlen Aspenes	(Norway) Isak Frey	
13	17 January 2025	(Slovakia) Brezno-Osrblie (5)	10 km SPR	(Norway) Isak Frey	(Austria) Fabian Müllauer	(Norway) Sivert Guttorm Bakken	
2025 IBU Open European Championships (29 January–2 February)
14	29 January 2025	(Italy) Martell-Val Martello (ECH)	20 km IND	(Norway) Isak Frey	(Austria) Fredrik Mühlbacher	(Sweden) Emil Nykvist	
15	31 January 2025	(Italy) Martell-Val Martello (ECH)	10 km SPR	(Norway) Sivert Guttorm Bakken	(Norway) Vetle Sjåstad Christiansen	(Austria) Fredrik Mühlbacher	
16	1 February 2025	(Italy) Martell-Val Martello (ECH)	12.5 km PUR	(Italy) Patrick Braunhofer	(Norway) Isak Frey	(Norway) Sverre Dahlen Aspenes	
17	5 February 2025	(Italy) Ridnaun-Val Ridanna (6)	10 km SPR	(Germany) David Zobel	(Norway) Sivert Guttorm Bakken	(United States) Paul Schommer	
18	7 February 2025	(Italy) Ridnaun-Val Ridanna (6)	12.5 km PUR	(Norway) Johannes Dale-Skjevdal	(Norway) Isak Frey	(United States) Paul Schommer	
19	8 February 2025	(Italy) Ridnaun-Val Ridanna (6)	15 km MSS 60	(Norway) Johannes Dale-Skjevdal	(Germany) Simon Kaiser	(Norway) Isak Frey	
20	6 March 2025	(Estonia) Otepää (7), (8)	10 km SPR	(Norway) Isak Frey	(Norway) Vetle Sjåstad Christiansen	(Norway) Johannes Dale-Skjevdal	
21	8 March 2025	(Estonia) Otepää (7), (8)	12.5 km PUR	(Norway) Johan-Olav Botn	(Norway) Vetle Sjåstad Christiansen	(Norway) Johannes Dale-Skjevdal	
22	9 March 2025	(Estonia) Otepää (7), (8)	15 km MSS	(Norway) Vetle Sjåstad Christiansen	(Norway) Johan-Olav Botn	(Norway) Isak Frey	
23	12 March 2025	(Estonia) Otepää (7), (8)	15 km SIND	(Norway) Sivert Guttorm Bakken	(Germany) Roman Rees	(Germany) Lucas Fratzscher	
24	14 March 2025	(Estonia) Otepää (7), (8)	10 km SPR	(Norway) Johan-Olav Botn	(Norway) Sverre Dahlen Aspenes	(Germany) Roman Rees	
17th IBU Cup Overall (28 November 2024 – 14 March 2025)				(Norway) Isak Frey	(Norway) Sivert Guttorm Bakken	(Norway) Johan-Olav Botn	

=== Relay – 4 x 7.5 km ===
No.	Date	Place (In brackets Stage)	Winner	Second	Third	Leader (After competition)	R.
1	2 February 2025	(Italy) Martell-Val Martello (ECH)	Norway: 1. Vetle Sjåstad Christiansen; 2. Sverre Dahlen Aspenes; 3. Sivert Guttorm Bakken; 4. Isak Frey	Germany: 1. Lucas Fratzscher; 2. Simon Kaiser; 3. Roman Rees; 4. David Zobel	France: 1. Théo Guiraud-Poillot; 2. Gaëtan Paturel; 3. Oscar Lombardot; 4. Rémi Broutier	Norway	

=== Overall leaders ===
Holder	Date	Place(s)	Number of competitions
Individual
(Norway) Sverre Dahlen Aspenes	28 November 2024	(Sweden) Idre Fjäll	1
(Norway) Martin Uldal (1)	30 November 2024	(Sweden) Idre Fjäll	1
(Norway) Isak Frey (1)	1 December 2024 – 6 December 2024	(Sweden) Idre Fjäll – (Norway) Geilo	3
(Norway) Martin Uldal (2)	7 December 2024	(Norway) Geilo	1
(Norway) Johan-Olav Botn	19 December 2024 – 21 December 2024	(Austria) Obertilliach	2
(Norway) Isak Frey (2)	9 January 2025 – 14 March 2025	(Germany) Arber – (Estonia) Otepää	16
Under 23
(Norway) Isak Frey	28 November 2024 – 14 March 2025	(Sweden) Idre Fjäll – (Estonia) Otepää	24

=== Standings ===
==== Overall ====
Rank	final standings after 24 events	Points
1	(Norway) Isak Frey	1494
2	(Norway) Sivert Guttorm Bakken	1276
3	(Norway) Johan-Olav Botn	1144
4	(Norway) Sverre Dahlen Aspenes	991
5	(Norway) Johannes Dale-Skjevdal	881
6	(Germany) Roman Rees	821
7	(Germany) Lucas Fratzscher	808
8	(France) Gaëtan Paturel	601
9	(Germany) Simon Kaiser	595
10	(Italy) Nicola Romanin	545

==== Under 23 ====
Rank	final standings after 24 events	Points
1	(Norway) Isak Frey	1494
2	(France) Gaëtan Paturel	601
3	(France) Théo Guiraud-Poillot	513
4	(Germany) Franz Schaser	346
5	(Italy) Nicolò Betemps	318
6	(Italy) Marco Barale	267
7	(Italy) Christoph Pircher	253
8	(Austria) Fabian Müllauer	241
9	(Finland) Jimi Klemettinen	235
10	(Greenland) Sondre Slettemark	177

==== Individual ====
Rank	final standings after 4 events	Points
1	(Norway) Isak Frey	245
2	(Norway) Sivert Guttorm Bakken	243
3	(Norway) Johan-Olav Botn	180
4	(France) Gaëtan Paturel	160
5	(Norway) Sverre Dahlen Aspenes	155

==== Sprint ====
Rank	final standings after 11 events	Points
1	(Norway) Isak Frey	624
2	(Norway) Sivert Guttorm Bakken	581
3	(Norway) Sverre Dahlen Aspenes	480
4	(Norway) Johan-Olav Botn	468
5	(Germany) Roman Rees	392

==== Pursuit ====
Rank	final standings after 6 events	Points
1	(Norway) Isak Frey	420
2	(Norway) Sivert Guttorm Bakken	306
3	(Norway) Johan-Olav Botn	281
4	(Norway) Sverre Dahlen Aspenes	266
5	(Norway) Johannes Dale-Skjevdal	245

==== Mass start ====
Rank	final standings after 3 events	Points
1	(Norway) Johan-Olav Botn	215
2	(Norway) Johannes Dale-Skjevdal	210
3	(Norway) Isak Frey	205
4	(Norway) Sivert Guttorm Bakken	146
5	(Norway) Vetle Sjåstad Christiansen	124

==== Relay ====
Rank	final standings after 7 events	Points
1	Norway	580
2	France	475
3	Germany	380
4	Italy	359
5	Ukraine	338

==== Nations Cup ====
Rank	final standings after 22 events	Points
1	Norway	8420
2	France	7219
3	Italy	6900
4	Germany	6476
5	Ukraine	6236

== Women ==
=== Calendar ===
Key: IND – Individual / SIND – Short Individual / SPR – Sprint / PUR – Pursuit / MSS – Mass Start
No.	Date	Place (In brackets Stage)	Discipline	Winner	Second	Third	R.
1	28 November 2024	(Sweden) Idre Fjäll (1)	7.5 km SPR	(France) Paula Botet	(France) Chloé Chevalier	(Germany) Anna Weidel	
2	30 November 2024	(Sweden) Idre Fjäll (1)	7.5 km SPR	(Norway) Ida Lien	(France) Paula Botet	(France) Camille Bened	
3	1 December 2024	(Sweden) Idre Fjäll (1)	10 km PUR	(Norway) Ida Lien	(Germany) Anna Weidel	(France) Camille Bened	
4	4 December 2024	(Norway) Geilo (2)	15 km IND	(France) Camille Bened	(Norway) Marit Øygard	(France) Fany Bertrand	
5	6 December 2024	(Norway) Geilo (2)	7.5 km SPR	(France) Paula Botet	(Germany) Marlene Fichtner	(Sweden) Johanna Skottheim	
6	7 December 2024	(Norway) Geilo (2)	10 km PUR	(Germany) Marlene Fichtner	(France) Chloé Chevalier	(France) Paula Botet	
7	19 December 2024	(Austria) Obertilliach (3)	7.5 km SPR	(Italy) Ilaria Scattolo	(France) Gilonne Guigonnat	(France) Paula Botet	
8	21 December 2024	(Austria) Obertilliach (3)	12.5 km MSS 60	(Germany) Stefanie Scherer	(France) Paula Botet	(France) Camille Bened	
9	9 January 2025	(Germany) Arber (4)	7.5 km SPR	(France) Amandine Mengin	(France) Sophie Chauveau	(Italy) Rebecca Passler	
10	11 January 2025	(Germany) Arber (4)	7.5 km SPR	(France) Gilonne Guigonnat	(France) Amandine Mengin	(France) Voldiya Galmace Paulin	
11	12 January 2025	(Germany) Arber (4)	10 km PUR	(France) Amandine Mengin	(Norway) Ragnhild Femsteinevik	(France) Voldiya Galmace Paulin	
12	15 January 2025	(Slovakia) Brezno-Osrblie (5)	12.5 km SIND	(Norway) Karoline Erdal	(France) Voldiya Galmace Paulin	(Ukraine) Anastasiya Merkushyna	
13	17 January 2025	(Slovakia) Brezno-Osrblie (5)	7.5 km SPR	(Norway) Marthe Kråkstad Johansen	(France) Voldiya Galmace Paulin	(Norway) Karoline Erdal	
2025 IBU Open European Championships (29 January–2 February)
14	29 January 2025	(Italy) Martell-Val Martello (ECH)	15 km IND	(Germany) Johanna Puff	(Germany) Marlene Fichtner	(Sweden) Anna-Karin Heijdenberg	
15	31 January 2025	(Italy) Martell-Val Martello (ECH)	7.5 km SPR	(Sweden) Anna-Karin Heijdenberg	(France) Amandine Mengin	(Latvia) Baiba Bendika	
16	1 February 2025	(Italy) Martell-Val Martello (ECH)	10 km PUR	(Latvia) Baiba Bendika	(Sweden) Anna-Karin Heijdenberg	(Italy) Linda Zingerle	
17	5 February 2025	(Italy) Ridnaun-Val Ridanna (6)	7.5 km SPR	(France) Voldiya Galmace Paulin	(France) Paula Botet	(Norway) Marthe Kråkstad Johansen	
18	7 February 2025	(Italy) Ridnaun-Val Ridanna (6)	10 km PUR	(France) Voldiya Galmace Paulin	(Norway) Marthe Kråkstad Johansen	(France) Sophie Chauveau	
19	8 February 2025	(Italy) Ridnaun-Val Ridanna (6)	12.5 km MSS 60	(France) Sophie Chauveau	(France) Camille Bened	(Italy) Rebecca Passler	
20	6 March 2025	(Estonia) Otepää (7), (8)	7.5 km SPR	(France) Gilonne Guigonnat	(Italy) Rebecca Passler	(Czech Republic) Kristýna Otcovská	
21	8 March 2025	(Estonia) Otepää (7), (8)	10 km PUR	(France) Gilonne Guigonnat	(France) Camille Bened	(Norway) Juni Arnekleiv	
22	9 March 2025	(Estonia) Otepää (7), (8)	12.5 km MSS	(Czech Republic) Kristýna Otcovská	(France) Paula Botet	(France) Camille Bened	
23	12 March 2025	(Estonia) Otepää (7), (8)	12.5 km SIND	(Estonia) Susan Külm	(Norway) Karoline Erdal	(France) Camille Bened	
24	14 March 2025	(Estonia) Otepää (7), (8)	7.5 km SPR	(France) Voldiya Galmace Paulin	(France) Camille Bened	(France) Paula Botet	
17th IBU Cup Overall (28 November 2024 – 14 March 2025)				(France) Camille Bened	(France) Voldiya Galmace Paulin	(France) Paula Botet	

=== Relay – 4 x 6 km ===
No.	Date	Place (In brackets Stage)	Winner	Second	Third	Leader (After competition)	R.
1	2 February 2025	(Italy) Martell-Val Martello (ECH)	Germany: 1. Stefanie Scherer; 2. Anna Weidel; 3. Marlene Fichtner; 4. Johanna Puff	France: 1. Camille Bened; 2. Sophie Chauveau; 3. Amandine Mengin; 4. Gilonne Guigonnat	Italy: 1. Rebecca Passler; 2. Ilaria Scattolo; 3. Birgit Schölzhorn; 4. Linda Zingerle	Norway	

=== Overall leaders ===
Holder	Date	Place(s)	Number of competitions
Individual
(France) Paula Botet (1)	28 November 2024 – 1 December 2024	(Sweden) Idre Fjäll	3
(France) Camille Bened (1)	4 December 2024	(Norway) Geilo	1
(France) Paula Botet (2)	6 December 2024 – 9 January 2025	(Norway) Geilo – (Germany) Arber	5
(France) Camille Bened (2)	11 January 2025 – 1 February 2025	(Germany) Arber – (Italy) Martell-Val Martello	7
(France) Voldiya Galmace Paulin	5 February 2025 – 6 March 2025	(Italy) Ridnaun-Val Ridanna – (Estonia) Otepää	4
(France) Camille Bened (3)	8 March 2025 – 14 March 2025	(Estonia) Otepää	4
Under 23
(Austria) Anna Andexer	28 November 2024	(Sweden) Idre Fjäll	1
(Norway) Siri Skar	30 November 2024 – 21 December 2024	(Sweden) Idre Fjäll – (Austria) Obertilliach	7
(Germany) Marlene Fichtner	9 January 2025 – 11 January 2025	(Germany) Arber	2
(France) Voldiya Galmace Paulin	12 January 2025 – 14 March 2025	(Germany) Arber – (Estonia) Otepää	14

=== Standings ===
==== Overall ====
Rank	final standings after 24 events	Points
1	(France) Camille Bened	1143
2	(France) Voldiya Galmace Paulin	1072
3	(France) Paula Botet	934
4	(Norway) Karoline Erdal	695
5	(France) Gilonne Guigonnat	680
6	(Germany) Stefanie Scherer	652
7	(France) Amandine Mengin	631
8	(France) Sophie Chauveau	599
9	(Norway) Marthe Kråkstad Johansen	584
10	(Italy) Rebecca Passler	551

==== Under 23 ====
Rank	final standings after 24 events	Points
1	(France) Voldiya Galmace Paulin	1072
2	(France) Amandine Mengin	631
3	(Germany) Marlene Fichtner	545
4	(Norway) Siri Skar	476
5	(France) Fany Bertrand	344
6	(Italy) Linda Zingerle	323
7	(Austria) Lara Wagner	289
8	(Italy) Ilaria Scattolo	223
9	(Germany) Johanna Puff	221
10	(Italy) Birgit Schölzhorn	193

==== Individual ====
Rank	final standings after 4 events	Points
1	(France) Voldiya Galmace Paulin	225
2	(Norway) Karoline Erdal	187
3	(France) Camille Bened	180
4	(Norway) Marit Øygard	116
5	(Germany) Marlene Fichtner	103

==== Sprint ====
Rank	final standings after 11 events	Points
1	(France) Paula Botet	486
2	(France) Voldiya Galmace Paulin	481
3	(France) Camille Bened	451
4	(France) Gilonne Guigonnat	429
5	(Norway) Karoline Erdal	328

==== Pursuit ====
Rank	final standings after 6 events	Points
1	(France) Camille Bened	307
2	(France) Voldiya Galmace Paulin	251
3	(France) Paula Botet	216
4	(Germany) Anna Weidel	202
5	(Germany) Marlene Fichtner	174

==== Mass start ====
Rank	final standings after 3 events	Points
1	(France) Camille Bened	205
2	(France) Paula Botet	171
3	(Germany) Stefanie Scherer	168
4	(France) Voldiya Galmace Paulin	115
5	(Italy) Rebecca Passler	100

==== Relay ====
Rank	final standings after 7 events	Points
1	Norway	531
2	France	485
3	Germany	395
4	Italy	369
5	Ukraine	338

==== Nations Cup ====
Rank	final standings after 22 events	Points
1	France	8080
2	Norway	7615
3	Austria	6616
4	Italy	6595
5	Sweden	6589

== Mixed Relay ==
No.	Date	Place (In brackets Stage)	Winner	Second	Third	R.
Mixed Relay – 4 x 6 km
1	22 December 2024	(Austria) Obertilliach (3)	Norway: 1. Johannes Dale-Skjevdal; 2. Johan-Olav Botn; 3. Siri Skar; 4. Ragnhild Femsteinevik	Germany: 1. Lucas Fratzscher; 2. David Zobel; 3. Marion Wiesensarter; 4. Sophia Schneider	France: 1. Gaëtan Paturel; 2. Oscar Lombardot; 3. Chloé Chevalier; 4. Paula Botet	
3	18 January 2025	(Slovakia) Brezno-Osrblie (5)	Norway: 1. Marthe Kråkstad Johansen; 2. Siri Skar; 3. Sverre Dahlen Aspenes; 4. Isak Frey	Austria: 1. Lea Rothschopf; 2. Lara Wagner; 3. Fredrik Mühlbacher; 4. Fabian Müllauer	Italy: 1. Ilaria Scattolo; 2. Beatrice Trabucchi; 3. Iacopo Leonesio; 4. Nicola Romanin	
5	15 March 2025	(Estonia) Otepää (8)	Germany: 1. Roman Rees; 2. Simon Kaiser; 3. Stefanie Scherer; 4. Lisa Maria Spark	France: 1. Damien Levet; 2. Gaëtan Paturel; 3. Célia Henaff; 4. Paula Botet	Norway: 1. Sivert Guttorm Bakken; 2. Johan-Olav Botn; 3. Karoline Erdal; 4. Juni Arnekleiv	
Single Mixed Relay – 6 km + 7.5 km
2	22 December 2024	(Austria) Obertilliach (3)	Norway: 1. Isak Frey; 2. Marthe Kråkstad Johansen	France: 1. Mathieu Garcia; 2. Camille Bened	Germany: 1. Roman Rees; 2. Stefanie Scherer	
4	18 January 2025	(Slovakia) Brezno-Osrblie (5)	Norway: 1. Karoline Erdal; 2. Sivert Guttorm Bakken	Czech Republic: 1. Tereza Vinklárková; 2. Tomáš Mikyska	Ukraine: 1. Anastasiya Merkushyna; 2. Artem Tyshchenko	
6	15 March 2025	(Estonia) Otepää (8)	France: 1. Théo Guiraud-Poillot; 2. Gilonne Guigonnat	Germany: 1. Anna Weidel; 2. Lucas Fratzscher	Norway: 1. Sverre Dahlen Aspenes; 2. Gro Randby	

== Podium table by nation ==
Table showing the IBU Cup podium places (gold–1st place, silver–2nd place, bronze–3rd place) by the countries represented by the athletes.

Rank	Nation	Gold	Silver	Bronze	Total
1	Norway	31	23	19	73
2	France	13	19	15	47
3	Germany	6	8	7	21
4	Italy	2	1	5	8
5	Sweden	1	1	3	5
6	Czech Republic	1	1	1	3
7	Latvia	1	0	1	2
8	Estonia	1	0	0	1
9	Austria	0	3	1	4
10	Ukraine	0	0	2	2
10	United States	0	0	2	2
Totals (11 entries)		56	56	56	168

== Points distribution ==
The table shows the number of points won in the 2024–25 Biathlon IBU Cup for men and women.

Place	1	2	3	4	5	6	7	8	9	10	11	12	13	14	15	16	17	18	19	20	21	22	23	24	25	26	27	28	29	30	31	32	33	34	35	36	37	38	39	40
Individual	90	75	65	55	50	45	41	37	34	31	30	29	28	27	26	25	24	23	22	21	20	19	18	17	16	15	14	13	12	11	10	9	8	7	6	5	4	3	2	1
Sprint	90	75	65	55	50	45	41	37	34	31	30	29	28	27	26	25	24	23	22	21	20	19	18	17	16	15	14	13	12	11	10	9	8	7	6	5	4	3	2	1
Pursuit	90	75	65	55	50	45	41	37	34	31	30	29	28	27	26	25	24	23	22	21	20	19	18	17	16	15	14	13	12	11	10	9	8	7	6	5	4	3	2	1
Mass Start	90	75	65	55	50	45	41	37	34	31	30	29	28	27	26	25	24	23	22	21	20	19	18	17	16	15	14	13	12	11	10	9	8	7	6	5	4	3	2	1

== Retirements ==
The following notable biathletes, who competed in the IBU Cup and never participated in the World Cup, are expected to retire during or after the 2024–25 season:

Men

- (France) Paul Fontaine
- (France) Sebastien Mahon
- (France) Ambroise Meunier
- (France) Mathieu Perrillat-Bottonet

Women

- (Norway) Maren Bakken
- (Switzerland) Flavia Barmettler
- (Czech Republic) Svatava Mikysková
- (France) Noemie Remonnay

== See also ==
- 2024–25 Biathlon World Cup (as the highest competition series of IBU)
- 2025 Biathlon World Championships
- 2025 IBU Open European Championships
- 2025 IBU Junior World Championships
- 2025 IBU Junior Open European Championships
