= 2024–25 Biathlon World Cup – Stage 2 =

2024–25 Biathlon World Cup Stage

The 2024–25 Biathlon World Cup – Stage 2 was the second event of the season and was held in Hochfilzen, Austria, from 9 December to 15 December 2024. The event consisted of two individual competitions and two relay races for both genders. World Cup leaders after the events in Hochfilzen were Johannes Thingnes Bø for men and Franziska Preuß for the women. U-23 World Cup ranking leaders after the events in Hochfilzen were Campbell Wright for men and Océane Michelon for the women. Sophie Chauveau finished in second place in a Biathlon World Cup event for the first time in her career. The German women's team won the relay race for the first time since the 2020/21 season, when they claimed victory at the 6 stage. Selina Grotian and Julia Tannheimer achieved their first wins in the relay.

== Medal winners ==
=== Men ===
Event:	Gold:	Time	Silver:	Time	Bronze:	Time
10 km Sprint	Johannes Thingnes Bø; Norway	24:23.1 (0+1)	Sturla Holm Lægreid; Norway	+4.2 (0+0)	Fabien Claude; France	+6.8 (0+0)
12.5 km Pursuit	Johannes Thingnes Bø; Norway	32:16.5 (0+0+1+1)	Émilien Jacquelin; France	+3.5 (0+0+0+1)	Sturla Holm Lægreid; Norway	+3.8 (0+0+0+1)
4 x 7.5 km Men Relay	France; Fabien Claude; Quentin Fillon Maillet; Éric Perrot; Émilien Jacquelin	1:23:04.3 (0+0) (0+5) (0+2) (0+1) (0+3) (0+4) (0+4) (0+2)	Norway; Sturla Holm Lægreid; Tarjei Bø; Johannes Thingnes Bø; Vebjørn Sørum	1:23:53.3 (0+0) (0+0) (0+2) (0+1) (0+3) (0+1) (1+3) (0+1)	Sweden; Viktor Brandt; Jesper Nelin; Martin Ponsiluoma; Sebastian Samuelsson	1:25:03.5 (1+0) (0+3) (0+1) (0+3) (0+3) (0+3) (0+3) (0+2)

=== Women ===
Event:	Gold:	Time	Silver:	Time	Bronze:	Time
7.5 km Sprint	Franziska Preuß; Germany	21:06.0 (0+1)	Sophie Chauveau; France	+7.7 (0+0)	Karoline Offigstad Knotten; Norway	+10.1 (0+0)
10 km Pursuit	Lou Jeanmonnot; France	29:48.5 (0+0+0+0)	Vanessa Voigt; Germany	+33.8 (0+0+0+0)	Franziska Preuß; Germany	+35.3 (0+0+2+1)
4 x 6 km Women Relay	Germany; Vanessa Voigt; Julia Tannheimer; Selina Grotian; Franziska Preuß	1:16:13.7 (0+0) (0+1) (0+1) (0+0) (0+2) (0+0) (0+0) (0+0)	France; Julia Simon; Justine Braisaz-Bouchet; Sophie Chauveau; Lou Jeanmonnot	1:17:19.4 (0+0) (0+2) (0+2) (0+2) (0+0) (0+2) (0+2) (1+3)	Sweden; Anna Magnusson; Anna-Karin Heijdenberg; Ella Halvarsson; Elvira Öberg	1:17:45.5 (0+2) (0+0) (0+0) (1+3) (0+0) (0+0) (0+1) (0+0)

== Achievements ==
Best individual performance for all time

Men

- (Norway) Martin Uldal (23), reached No. 5 on pursuit race
- (Bulgaria) Blagoy Todev (23), reached No. 20 on sprint race
- (Czech Republic) Jonáš Mareček (23), reached No. 22 on pursuit race
- (Poland) Jan Guńka (22), reached No. 29 on sprint race
- (Poland) Konrad Badacz (21), reached No. 30 on sprint race
- (Germany) Simon Kaiser (25), reached No. 25 on pursuit race
- (Croatia) Matija Legović (19), reached No. 43 on sprint race
- (Canada) Logan Pletz (24), reached No. 55 on pursuit race
- (Switzerland) Dajan Danuser (28), reached No. 57 on sprint race
- (Kazakhstan) Vadim Kurales (22), reached No. 61 on sprint race
- (Belgium) Marek Mackels (25), reached No. 77 on sprint race
- (China) Cang Gu (22), reached No. 78 on sprint race
- (Slovakia) Šimon Adamov (20), reached No. 84 on sprint race
- (Canada) Haldan Borglum (20), reached No. 90 on sprint race
- (Austria) Fabian Müllauer (21), reached No. 100 on sprint race
- (Canada) Daniel Gilfillan (20), reached No. 107 on sprint race

Women

- (France) Sophie Chauveau (25), reached No. 2 on sprint race
- (Italy) Hannah Auchentaller (23), reached No. 12 on sprint race
- (Belgium) Maya Cloetens (22), reached No. 12 on pursuit race
- (Austria) Anna Andexer (21), reached No. 25 on sprint race
- (Germany) Julia Kink (20), reached No. 31 on pursuit race
- (Germany) Marlene Fichtner (21), reached No. 46 on sprint race
- (Italy) Martina Trabucchi (22), reached No. 51 on pursuit race
- (Norway) Marit Øygard (25), reached No. 84 on sprint race
- (United States) Lucinda Anderson (24), reached No. 94 on sprint race
