= 2025–26 Biathlon World Cup – Stage 2 =

2025–26 Biathlon World Cup Stage

The 2025–26 Biathlon World Cup – Stage 2 was the second event of the season and was held in Hochfilzen, Austria, from 08 to 14 December 2025. The event consisted of two individual competitions and two relay races, one by men and one by women. After all the races of the stage, Johan-Olav Botn leads the overall World Cup standings for men, and Anna Magnusson leads for women. U-23 World Cup ranking leaders after the events in Hochfilzen were Isak Frey for men and Maren Kirkeeide for the women.

Overall World Cup standings leaders after stage 2

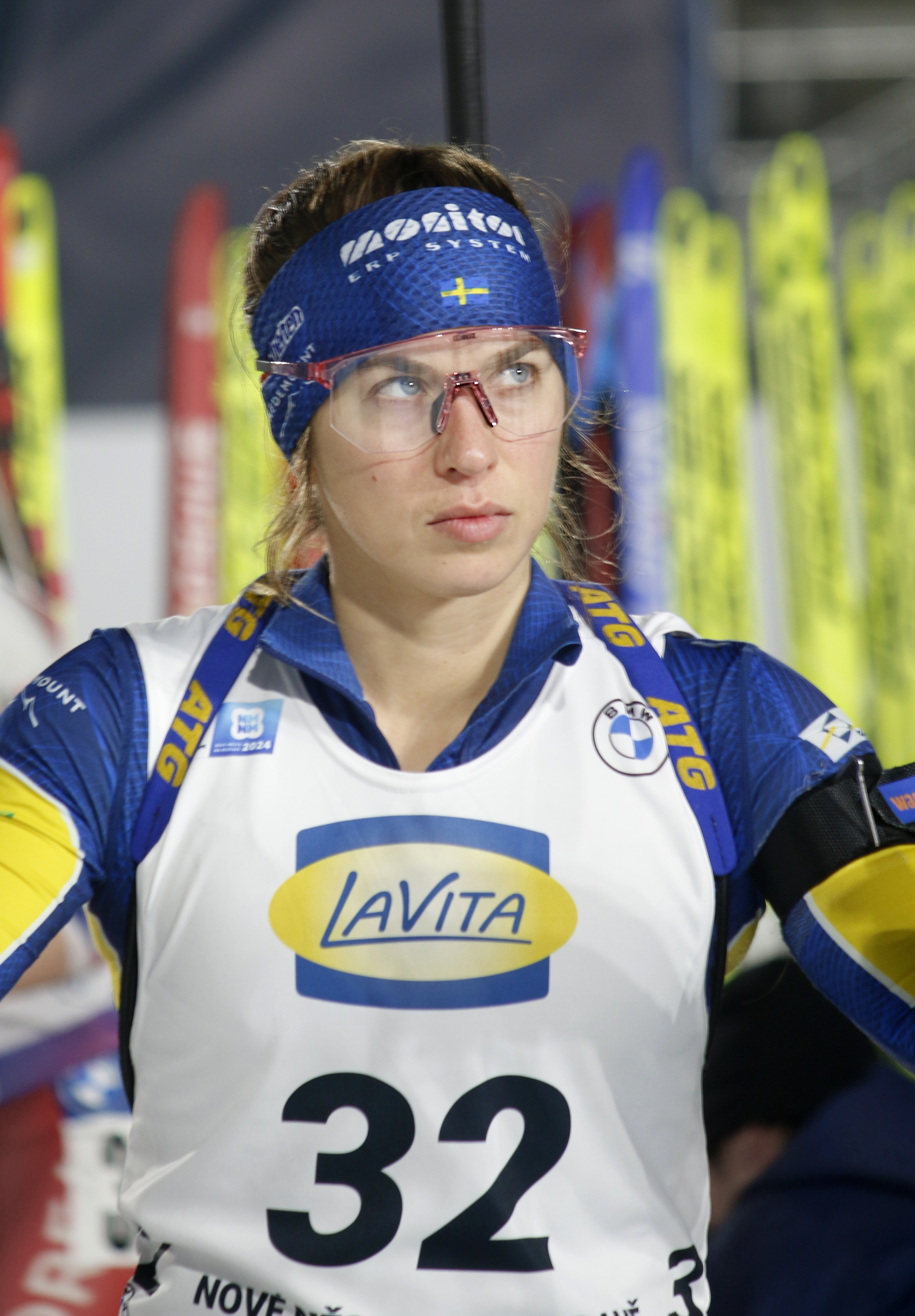
Anna Magnusson

== Stage overview ==
Ahead of the 2025–26 Biathlon World Cup stage in Hochfilzen, national federations announced their team selections, with several notable substitutions and athlete replacements. Norway initially selected Åsne Skrede and Johannes Dale-Skjevdal, while Endre Strømsheim and Isak Frey were not included in the first lineup. As the event approached, however, illness prompted several adjustments: Isak Frey was called up to replace Sivert Guttorm Bakken, and Åsne Skrede's anticipated World Cup debut had to be postponed for the same reason.

Ukraine introduced only one change to its otherwise stable roster, with Liliia Steblyna stepping in for Valeriya Dmytrenko ahead of the Hochfilzen competitions. France meanwhile highlighted both continuity and renewal: the team confirmed the return of Julia Simon, while Oscar Lombardot took over the spot of Antonin Guigonnat in the men's squad.

Italy’s selection blended experience with new opportunities: Christoph Pircher earned his first World Cup start, and Rebecca Passler was promoted from the IBU Cup to join the top-level roster. Germany made several roster updates as well, calling up David Zobel and Julia Kink, while confirming the participation of Franziska Preuß. However, shortly afterward, both Preuß and Selina Grotian withdrew due to health-related issues, prompting further adjustments to the German delegation.

Host nation Austria confirmed a nine-athlete squad led by seasoned competitor Lisa Theresa Hauser, while Slovakia fielded a mix of experience and youth, retaining established athletes Anastasiya Kuzmina and Paulína Bátovská Fialková and giving a World Cup debut to Martin Matko.

The Czech federation made a single modification by replacing Tereza Vinklárková with Ilona Plecháčová. Switzerland also updated its lineup: Jeremy Finello was brought in to replace Dajan Danuser, and later, leading athlete Niklas Hartweg withdrew from both Hochfilzen and Le Grand-Bornand due to illness.

Finally, Slovenia’s selection featured a balanced trio of experienced athletes and newcomers, with Anamarija Lampič, Jakov Fak, and debutant Ela Sever all named to the squad. However, the lineup was soon impacted when Lampič withdrew due to illness shortly before the competition.

== Schedule of events ==
The events took place at the following times.

Date	Time	Events
12 December	12:25 CET	Men's 10 km Sprint
12 December	15:15 CET	Women's 7.5 km Sprint
13 December	13:00 CET	Men's 12.5 km Pursuit
13 December	15:15 CET	4 x 5 km Women Relay
14 December	13:00 CET	4 x 7.5 km Men Relay
14 December	15:45 CET	Women's 10 km Pursuit

== Medal winners ==
=== Men ===
Event:	Gold:	Time	Silver:	Time	Bronze:	Time
10 km Sprint	Tommaso Giacomel; Italy	23:04.5 (0+0)	Éric Perrot; France	23:08.5 (0+1)	Philipp Horn; Germany	23:10.5 (1+1)
12.5 km Pursuit	Éric Perrot; France	30:06.2 (0+0+0+0)	Tommaso Giacomel; Italy	30:16.4 (0+0+1+0)	Johan-Olav Botn; Norway	30:35.2 (1+0+0+0)
4 x 7.5 km Men Relay	Norway; Johannes Dale-Skjevdal; Johan-Olav Botn; Sturla Holm Laegreid; Vetle Sjåstad Christiansen	1:11:54.8 (0+0) (0+1) (0+1) (0+0) (0+0) (0+1) (0+0) (0+0)	France; Fabien Claude; Emilien Jacquelin; Quentin Fillon Maillet; Éric Perrot	1:12:37.9 (0+0) (0+1) (0+1) (0+1) (0+1) (0+1) (0+0) (0+3)	Sweden; Jesper Nelin; Malte Stefansson; Martin Ponsiluoma; Sebastian Samuelsson	1:13:00.5 (0+3) (0+2) (0+1) (0+1) (0+0) (0+1) (0+1) (0+0)

=== Women ===
Event:	Gold:	Time	Silver:	Time	Bronze:	Time
7.5 km Sprint	Lou Jeanmonnot; France	19:59.4 (0+0)	Maren Kirkeeide; Norway	20:14.7 (0+1)	Anna Magnusson; Sweden	20:15.5 (0+0)
4 x 5 km Women Relay	Sweden; Ella Halvarsson; Anna Magnusson; Elvira Öberg; Hanna Öberg	1:06:52.4 (0+1) (0+1) (0+0) (0+1) (0+0) (0+1) (0+2) (0+1)	Norway; Marthe Kråkstad Johansen; Ingrid Landmark Tandrevold; Karoline Offigstad Knotten; Maren Kirkeeide	1:07:32.7 (0+0) (0+2) (0+1) (0+2) (0+0) (0+1) (0+1) (0+2)	Germany; Anna Weidel; Julia Tannheimer; Janina Hettich-Walz; Vanessa Voigt	1:07:43.7 (0+2) (0+1) (0+1) (0+2) (0+0) (0+2) (0+0) (0+0)
10 km Pursuit	Lisa Vittozzi; Italy	28:31.5 (0+0+0+0)	Anna Magnusson; Sweden	+11.4 (0+0+1+0)	Maren Kirkeeide; Norway	+39.5 (1+1+1+0)

== Achievements ==
Best individual performance for all time

Men

- (Germany) Philipp Horn (31) reached No. 3 on sprint race
- (Kazakhstan) Vladislav Kireyev (25) reached No. 20 on pursuit race
- (Poland) Grzegorz Galica (18) reached No. 24 on sprint race
- (Poland) Konrad Badacz (22) reached No. 25 on sprint race
- (Switzerland) Matthias Riebli (21) reached No. 70 on sprint race
- (Italy) Christoph Pircher (22) reached No. 75 on sprint race
- (Latvia) Rihards Lozbers (16) reached No. 80 on sprint race
- (Belgium) Sam Parmantier (20) reached No. 92 on sprint race
- (Slovakia) Martin Matko (20) reached No. 94 on sprint race
- (Bulgaria) Georgi Dzhorgov (18) reached No. 98 on sprint race

Women

- (Switzerland) Lea Meier (24) reached No. 14 on pursuit race
- (Norway) Marit Øygard (26) reached No. 24 on pursuit race
- (Germany) Marlene Fichtner (22) reached No. 31 on pursuit race
- (Bulgaria) Maria Zdravkova (27) reached No. 42 on sprint race
- (United Kingdom) Shawna Pendry (23) reached No. 62 on sprint race
- (Latvia) Annija Sabule (28) reached No. 63 on sprint race
- (Czech Republic) Ilona Plecháčová (18) reached No. 68 on sprint race
- (Kazakhstan) Milana Geneva (21) reached No. 70 on sprint race
- (Slovenia) Ela Sever (19) reached No. 85 on sprint race

First World Cup individual race

Men

- (Poland) Grzegorz Galica (18) reached No. 24 on sprint race
- (Switzerland) Matthias Riebli (21) reached No. 70 on sprint race
- (Italy) Christoph Pircher (22) reached No. 75 on sprint race
- (Belgium) Sam Parmantier (20) reached No. 92 on sprint race
- (Slovakia) Martin Matko (20) reached No. 94 on sprint race
- (Bulgaria) Georgi Dzhorgov (18) reached No. 98 on sprint race

Women

- (Slovenia) Ela Sever (19) reached No. 85 on sprint race
