= 2025–26 Biathlon World Cup – Stage 6 =

2025–26 Biathlon World Cup Stage

The 2025–26 Biathlon World Cup – Stage 6 was the sixth event of the season and was held in Nové Město na Moravě, Czech Republic, from 19 to 25 January 2026. The event consisted of two individual competitions and two mixed relay races. After all the races of the stage, Éric Perrot leads the overall World Cup standings for men, and Lou Jeanmonnot leads for women. U-23 World Cup ranking leaders after the events in Nové Město were Isak Frey for men and Maren Kirkeeide for the women.

== Stage overview ==
Overall World Cup standings leaders after stage 6

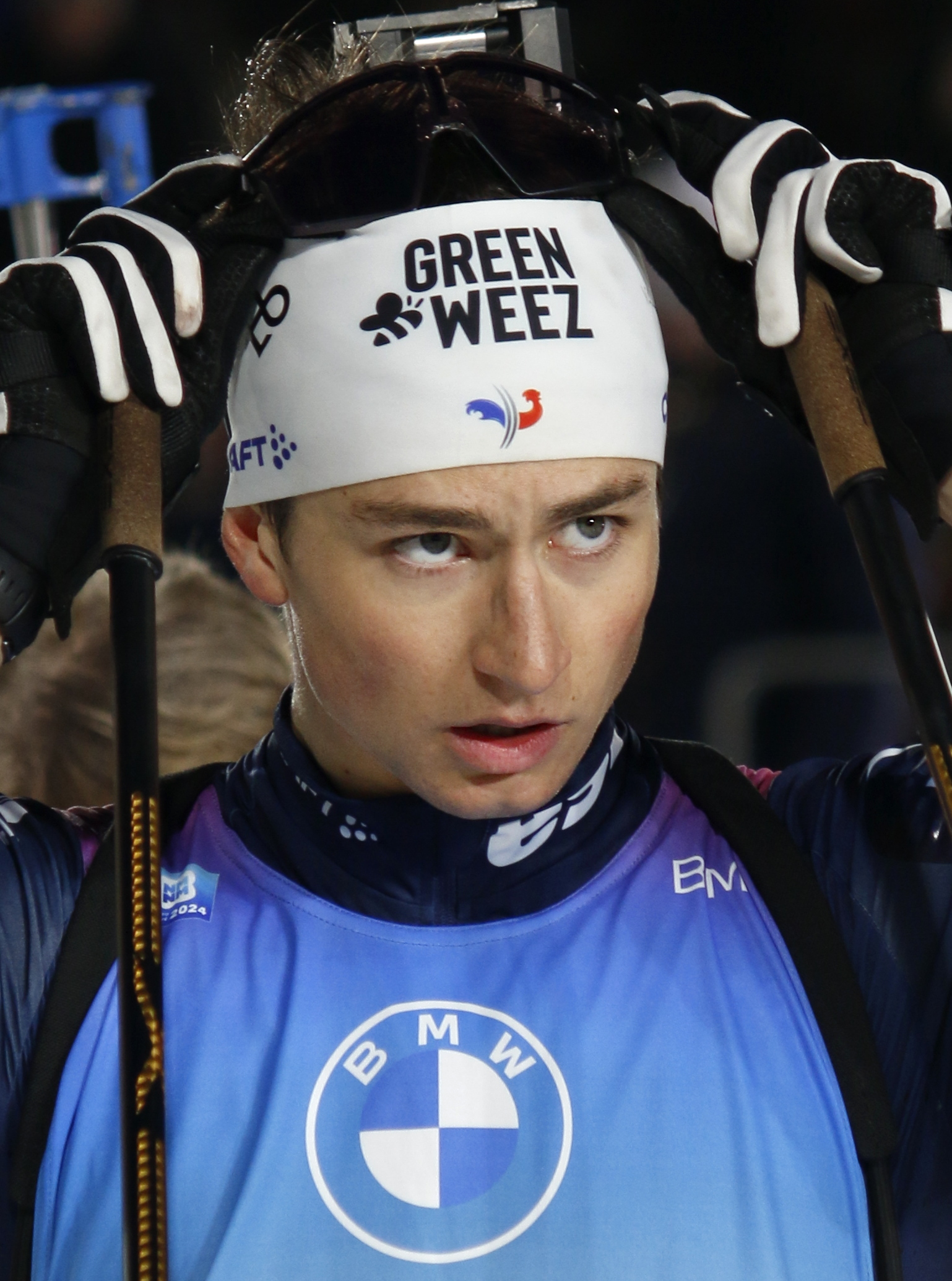
Éric Perrot

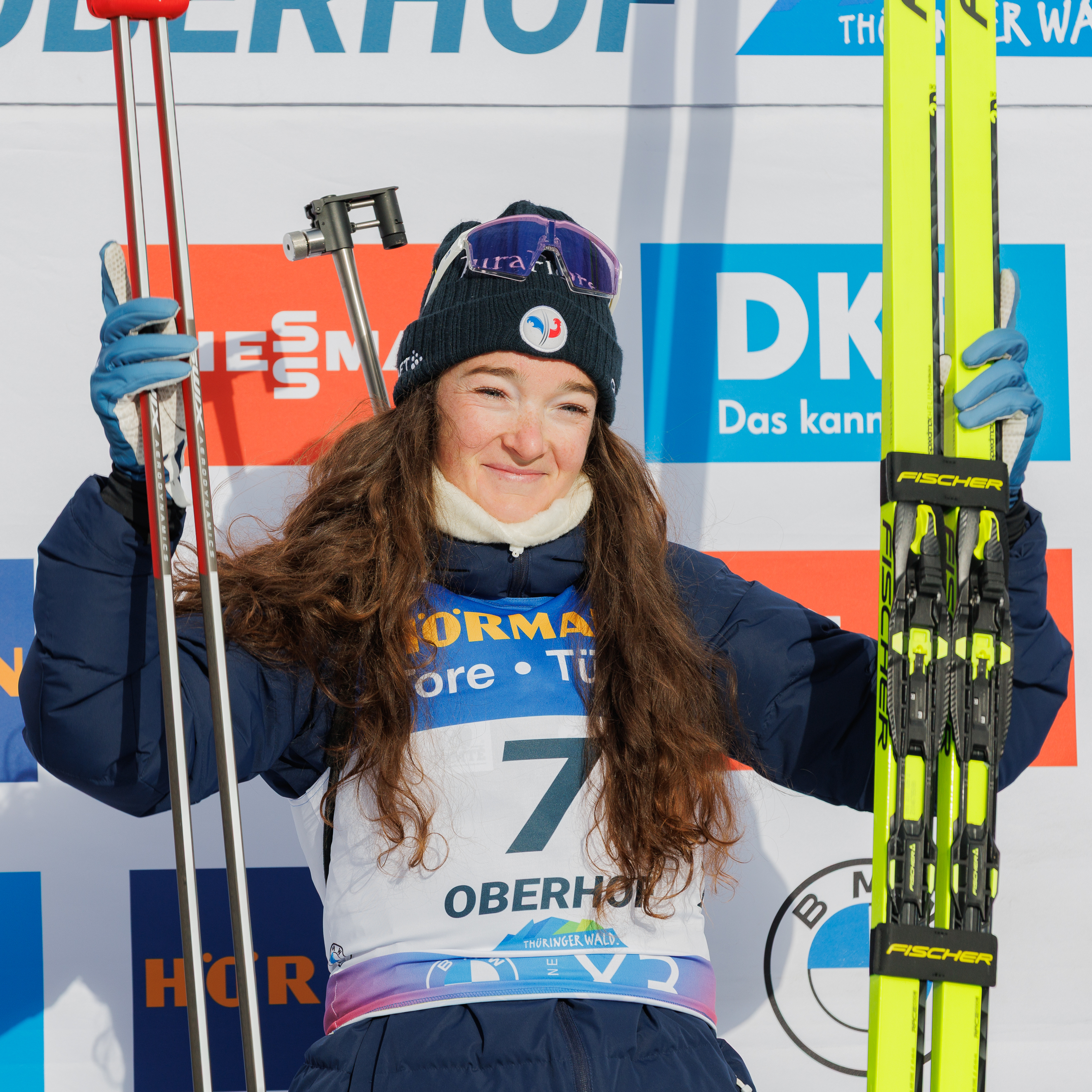
Lou Jeanmonnot

Going into the final competition weekend before the Olympic Games, Tommaso Giacomel and Lou Jeanmonnot led the overall World Cup standings.

Several nations fielded altered squads in Nové Město. The Norwegian national team was in a training camp, and in the men's field, with the exception of Isak Frey and the returning Johan-Olav Botn, only athletes not nominated for the Olympic Games competed. Ingrid Landmark Tandrevold, however, was back on the team, one of only four nominated Norwegian women. Vetle Paulsen and Guro Ytterhus made their debuts. While the French teams remained unchanged compared to the weekend in Ruhpolding, the Swedish team was missing Hanna Öberg and Elvira Öberg, as well as Ella Halvarsson and Linn Gestblom. Johanna Nordqvist made her World Cup debut, and Annie Lindh and Anna Hedström also returned to the highest level of competition after a long absence. The German team, with the exception of Olympic starters Franziska Preuß and Anna Weidel, also did not field their A-squad. Among the nominees were debutants Elias Seidl and Leonhard Pfund, as well as Hanna Kebinger and Roman Rees, who had not started in the World Cup for a long time. The Austrian federation had nominated Magnus Oberhauser and Patrick Jakob instead of Fabian Müllauer and Lukas Haslinger. For the Italian team, Rebecca Passler returned in exchange for Linda Zingerle. In the Swiss team, Niklas Hartweg was preparing privately for the Olympic Games and was therefore absent from the squad.

Campbell Wright earned his first World Cup podium, having previously reached the podium only at the World Championships. Sverre Dahlen Aspenes also secured the first podium finish of his career.

In the single mixed relay, the original winners – Germany, represented by Marlene Fichtner and Leonhard Pfund – were disqualified for violating safety rules on the shooting range.

== Schedule of events ==
The events took place at the following times.

Date	Time	Events
22 January	19:15 CET	Men's 15 km Short Individual
23 January	19:15 CET	Women's 12.5 km Short Individual
24 January	14:15 CET	Single Mixed Relay
24 January	16:10 CET	Mixed Relay
25 January	16:15 CET	Men's 15 km Mass Start
25 January	19:15 CET	Men's 12.5 km Mass Start

== Medal winners ==
=== Men ===
Event:	Gold:	Time	Silver:	Time	Bronze:	Time
15 km Short Individual	Éric Perrot; France	36:30.6 (0+0+0+0)	Émilien Jacquelin; France	37:12.4 (0+0+0+0)	Lukas Hofer; Italy	37:24.7 (0+0+0+0)
15 km Mass Start	Éric Perrot; France	35:59.6 (0+0+1+0)	Campbell Wright; United States	+9.0 (0+0+0+1)	Sverre Dahlen Aspenes; Norway	+16.2 (0+0+0+0)

=== Women ===
Event:	Gold:	Time	Silver:	Time	Bronze:	Time
12.5 km Short Individual	Justine Braisaz-Bouchet; France	35:50.3 (0+0+1+0)	Lou Jeanmonnot; France	35:51.7 (0+0+0+1)	Franziska Preuß; Germany	36:52.5 (0+0+1+1)
12.5 km Mass Start	Julia Simon; France	33:39.4 (0+1+0+0)	Océane Michelon; France	+0.5 (0+1+0+0)	Lisa Vittozzi; Italy	+2.7 (0+1+0+0)

=== Mixed ===
Event:	Gold:	Time	Silver:	Time	Bronze:	Time
Single Mixed Relay	Finland; Suvi Minkkinen; Tero Seppälä; Suvi Minkkinen; Tero Seppälä	34:59.8 (0+1) (0+1) (0+1) (0+1) (0+1) (0+1) (0+1) (0+1)	France; Jeanne Richard; Émilien Claude; Jeanne Richard; Émilien Claude	35:11.1 (0+0) (0+0) (0+0) (0+2) (0+0) (0+0) (0+3) (0+1)	Norway; Juni Arnekleiv; Martin Nevland; Juni Arnekleiv; Martin Nevland	35:16.5 (0+0) (0+2) (0+1) (0+2) (0+0) (0+0) (0+0) (0+3)
Mixed Relay	Italy; Dorothea Wierer; Lisa Vittozzi; Lukas Hofer; Tommaso Giacomel	1:03:11.7 (0+2) (0+3) (0+0) (0+3) (0+1) (0+0) (0+1) (0+0)	France; Océane Michelon; Justine Braisaz-Bouchet; Oscar Lombardot; Quentin Fillon Maillet	1:03:36.4 (0+2) (0+1) (0+1) (0+0) (0+0) (0+0) (0+2) (0+1)	Czech Republic; Jessica Jislová; Tereza Voborníková; Vítězslav Hornig; Michal Krčmář	1:04:08.9 (0+1) (0+3) (0+0) (0+0) (0+0) (0+2) (0+0) (0+1)

== Achievements ==
Best individual performance for all time

Men

- (Norway) Sverre Dahlen Aspenes (28) reached No. 3 on mass start race
- (France) Oscar Lombardot (25) reached No. 4 on short individual race
- (Norway) Martin Nevland (23) reached No. 5 on short individual race
- (Latvia) Renārs Birkentāls (24) reached No. 9 on short individual race
- (Germany) Leonhard Pfund (22) reached No. 13 on short individual race
- (Romania) Dmitrii Shamaev (30) reached No. 18 on short individual race
- (Finland) Arttu Heikkinen (21) reached No. 19 on short individual race
- (Austria) Patrick Jakob (29) reached No. 26 on short individual race
- (Norway) Vetle Paulsen (25) reached No. 32 on short individual race
- (Estonia) Mehis Udam (21) reached No. 52 on short individual race
- (Poland) Wojciech Skorusa (27) reached No. 60 on short individual race
- (Slovakia) Artur Iskhakov (22) reached No. 63 on short individual race
- (Germany) Elias Seidl (21) reached No. 69 on short individual race
- (Bulgaria) Georgi Dzhorgov (18) reached No. 82 on short individual race
- (Australia) Noah Bradford (22) reached No. 89 on short individual race
- (United States) Bjorn Westervelt (24) reached No. 93 on short individual race
- (Bulgaria) Valentin Karabadzhakov (23) reached No. 97 on short individual race
- (Bulgaria) Veselin Belchinski (19) reached No. 98 on short individual race

Women

- (Austria) Tamara Steiner (28) reached No. 6 on short individual race
- (Norway) Siri Skar (22) reached No. 7 on short individual race
- (Germany) Marlene Fichtner (22) reached No. 16 on short individual race
- (Czech Republic) Ilona Plecháčová (19) reached No. 18 on short individual race
- (Slovakia) Mária Remeňová (25) reached No. 20 on short individual race
- (Switzerland) Lydia Mettler (29) reached No. 24 on short individual race
- (Romania) Anastasia Tolmacheva (30) reached No. 29 on short individual race
- (United States) Margie Freed (28) reached No. 31 on short individual race
- (Ukraine) Valeriia Dmytrenko (28) reached No. 39 on short individual race
- (Sweden) Annie Lind (28) reached No. 49 on short individual race
- (Sweden) Anna Hedström (28) reached No. 57 on short individual race
- (Norway) Guro Ytterhus (21) reached No. 61 on short individual race
- (Canada) Gillian Gowling (26) reached No. 73 on short individual race
- (Sweden) Johanna Nordqvist (25) reached No. 79 on short individual race
- (Croatia) Iva Morić (21) reached No. 83 on short individual race
- (Canada) Janice Grundahl (25) reached No. 87 on short individual race
- (Estonia) Emma Roberta Rajando (21) reached No. 88 on short individual race
- (Bulgaria) Raya Adzhamova (18) reached No. 89 on short individual race
- (Canada) Moira Green (21) reached No. 92 on short individual race

First World Cup individual race

Men

- (Germany) Leonhard Pfund (22) reached No. 13 on short individual race
- (Norway) Vetle Paulsen (25) reached No. 32 on short individual race
- (Germany) Elias Seidl (21) reached No. 69 on short individual race
- (United States) Bjorn Westervelt (24) reached No. 93 on short individual race
- (Bulgaria) Valentin Karabadzhakov (23) reached No. 97 on short individual race
- (Bulgaria) Veselin Belchinski (19) reached No. 98 on short individual race

Women

- (Sweden) Annie Lind (28) reached No. 49 on short individual race
- (Norway) Guro Ytterhus (21) reached No. 61 on short individual race
- (Canada) Gillian Gowling (26) reached No. 73 on short individual race
- (Sweden) Johanna Nordqvist (25) reached No. 79 on short individual race
- (Canada) Janice Grundahl (25) reached No. 87 on short individual race
- (Bulgaria) Raya Adzhamova (18) reached No. 89 on short individual race
- (Canada) Moira Green (21) reached No. 92 on short individual race
