= 2025 IBU Open European Championships =

Biathlon competition

- Venue: Biathlon Center Grogg
- Location: Val Martello, Italy
- Dates: 26 January – 2 February

The 2025 IBU Open European Championships were held from 26 January to 2 February 2025 in Val Martello, Italy. Since the Biathlon European Championships are held as “open” competitions, the field of participants is not limited to athletes from Europe. Individual athletes and teams from North and South America, Asia, and Australia also take part in the competitions.

The championships are the highlight of the 2024/25 IBU Cup season. The results of the races also count towards the overall standings of the IBU Cup.

Instead of the mixed and single mixed relay, men's and women's relays will be held again for the first time since 2015.

== Schedule ==
All times are local (UTC+1).

| Date | Time | Event |
|---|---|---|
| 29 January | 10:30 | Women's 15 km individual |
| 29 January | 14:30 | Men's 20 km individual |
| 31 January | 10:45 | Women's 7.5 km sprint |
| 31 January | 14:15 | Men's 10 km sprint |
| 1 February | 11:00 | Women's 10 km pursuit |
| 1 February | 13:45 | Men's 12.5 km pursuit |
| 2 February | 10:45 | Women's 4 x 6 km relay |
| 2 February | 13:45 | Men's 4 x 7.5 km relay |

== Results ==
=== Men's ===
| Event | Gold | | Silver | | Bronze | |
|---|---|---|---|---|---|---|
| 20 km individual details | Isak Frey; Norway | 54:10.7 (1+1+0+0) | Fredrik Mühlbacher; Austria | 54:42.4 (0+0+0+1) | Emil Nykvist; Sweden | 54:57.9 (0+0+0+1) |
| 10 km sprint details | Sivert Guttorm Bakken; Norway | 25:03.6 (0+0) | Vetle Sjåstad Christiansen; Norway | 25:10.2 (0+0) | Fredrik Mühlbacher; Austria | 25:13.8 (0+0) |
| 12.5 km pursuit details | Patrick Braunhofer; Italy | 34:27.2 (0+0+0+0) | Isak Frey; Norway | 34:49.9 (0+0+2+0) | Sverre Dahlen Aspenes; Norway | 35:04.7 (1+0+1+2) |
| 4 x 7.5 km relay details | Norway Vetle Sjåstad Christiansen; Sverre Dahlen Aspenes; Sivert Guttorm Bakken; Isak Frey | 1:16:00.1 (0+1) (0+0) (0+0) (0+0) (0+0) (0+0) (0+0) (0+0) | Germany Lucas Fratzscher; Simon Kaiser; Roman Rees; David Zobel | 1:18:07.0 (0+0) (1+3) (0+3) (0+0) (0+1) (0+2) (0+0) (0+3) | France Théo Guiraud-Poillot; Gaëtan Paturel; Oscar Lombardot; Rémi Broutier | 1:18:36.3 (0+1) (0+1) (0+2) (1+3) (0+2) (0+2) (0+3) (1+3) |

=== Women's ===
| Event | Gold | | Silver | | Bronze | |
|---|---|---|---|---|---|---|
| 15 km individual details | Johanna Puff; Germany | 47:06.4 (0+0+0+0) | Marlene Fichtner; Germany | 47:15.9 (0+0+0+0) | Anna-Karin Heijdenberg; Sweden | 47:24.4 (1+1+0+1) |
| 7.5 km sprint details | Anna-Karin Heijdenberg; Sweden | 21:43.1 (0+0) | Amandine Mengin; France | 22:32.4 (1+0) | Baiba Bendika; Latvia | 22:32.5 (0+2) |
| 10 km pursuit details | Baiba Bendika; Latvia | 33:54.4 (0+0+0+3) | Anna-Karin Heijdenberg; Sweden | 34:10.0 (1+1+1+1) | Linda Zingerle; Italy | 34:13.6 (0+1+1+0) |
| 4 x 6 km relay details | Germany Stefanie Scherer; Anna Weidel; Marlene Fichtner; Johanna Puff | 1:14:04.2 (0+0) (0+0) (0+0) (0+3) (0+0) (0+3) (0+2) (0+1) | France Camille Bened; Sophie Chauveau; Amandine Mengin; Gilonne Guigonnat | 1:14:26.5 (0+0) (0+1) (0+1) (0+2) (0+1) (1+3) (0+1) (0+2) | Italy Rebecca Passler; Ilaria Scattolo; Birgit Schölzhorn; Linda Zingerle | 1:14:45.6 (0+1) (0+1) (0+0) (1+3) (0+0) (0+2) (0+1) (0+2) |

== Medal table ==
* Host nation (Italy)

| Rank | Nation | Gold | Silver | Bronze | Total |
|---|---|---|---|---|---|
| 1 | Norway | 3 | 2 | 1 | 6 |
| 2 | Germany | 2 | 2 | 0 | 4 |
| 3 | Sweden | 1 | 1 | 2 | 4 |
| 4 | Italy* | 1 | 0 | 2 | 3 |
| 5 | Latvia | 1 | 0 | 1 | 2 |
| 6 | France | 0 | 2 | 1 | 3 |
| 7 | Austria | 0 | 1 | 1 | 2 |
| Totals (7 entries) | | 8 | 8 | 8 | 24 |

== Participating nations ==
283 biathletes from 35 countries:

1. Argentina
2. Australia
3. Austria
4. Belgium
5. Bosnia and Herzegovina
6. Brazil
7. Bulgaria
8. Canada
9. Chile
10. Croatia
11. Czech Republic
12. Denmark
13. Estonia
14. Finland
15. France
16. Germany
17. Hungary
18. Italy (host)
19. Kazakhstan
20. Latvia
21. Lithuania
22. Mexico
23. Moldova
24. Norway
25. Poland
26. Romania
27. Slovakia
28. Slovenia
29. Spain
30. Sweden
31. Switzerland
32. Ukraine
33. United Kingdom
34. United States
35. Uzbekistan
