= Vitalii Mandzyn =

Ukrainian biathlete (born 2003)

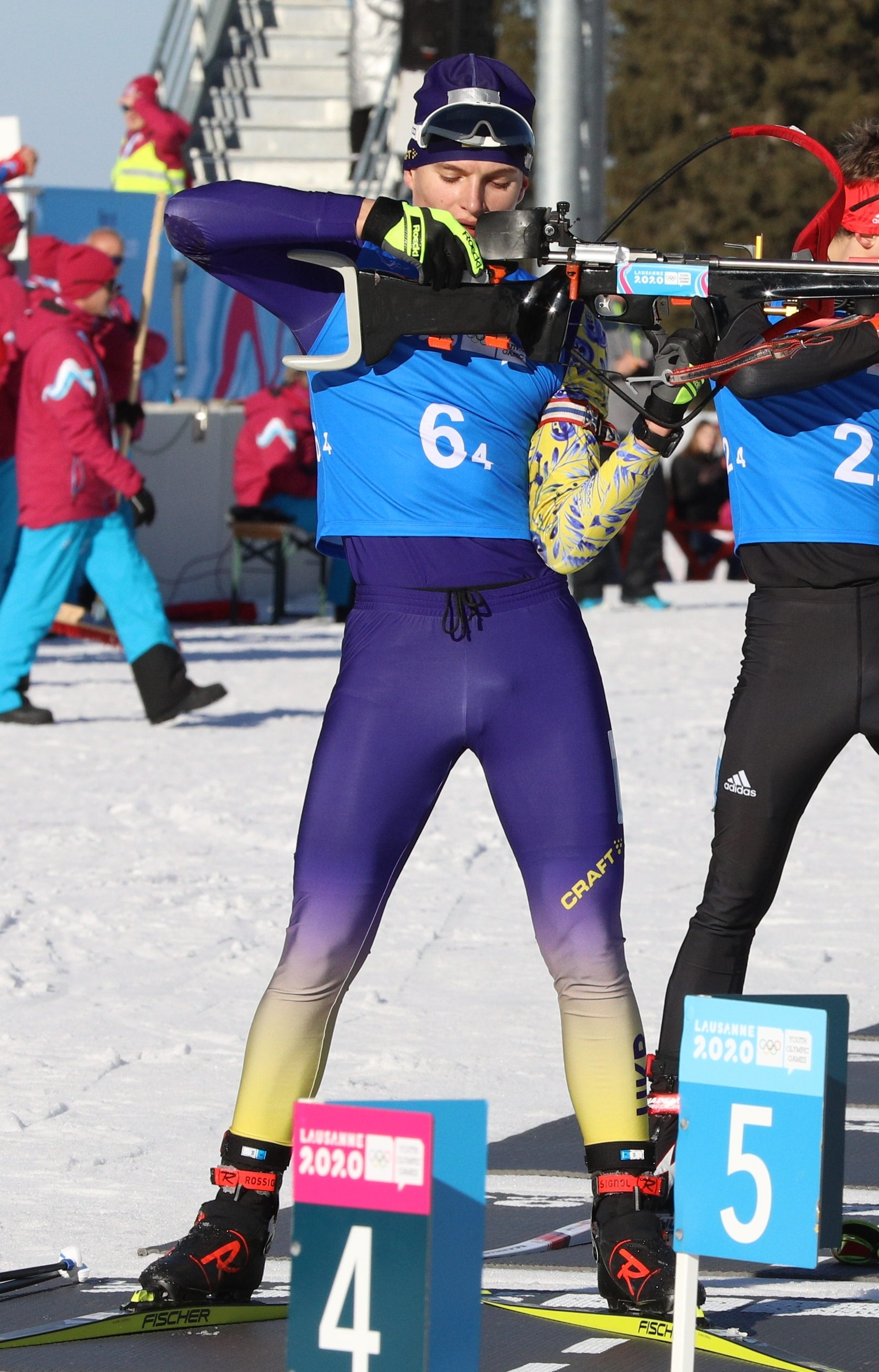
- Mandzyn in 2020

Personal information
- Nationality: Ukrainian
- Born: 5 April 2003 (age 23) Pidhaitsi, Ternopil Oblast, Ukraine

Sport
- Country: Ukraine
- Sport: Biathlon
Medal record
Men's biathlon
Representing Ukraine
Junior World Championships
Silver medal – second place	2024 Otepää	Relay
Junior European Championships
Silver medal – second place	2024 Jakuszyce	Mass start 60
Bronze medal – third place	2023 Madona	Mixed relay

Vitalii Mandzyn (Ukrainian: Віталій Ігорович Мандзин; born 5 April 2003) is a Ukrainian biathlete. He made his Biathlon World Cup debut in 2022.

== Career ==
Vitalii Mandzyn made his international debut at the 2020 Youth Olympic Games in Lausanne, where he finished fifth in the sprint and missed out on a medal by less than 20 seconds. He then took part in the 2020 World Youth Championships and finished seventh in the relay and 17th in the pursuit race. Vitalii also competed at the World Youth Championships the following year, but again missed out on the top 10. In the winter of 2021/22, he competed in the IBU Junior Cup and achieved a podium finish with the relay team. Mandzyn won his first medal in the IBU-level in the junior competitions at the 2020 Summer Biathlon World Championships, where he was only beaten by the Czechs Tomáš Mikyska and Jonáš Mareček in the pursuit. His debut in the IBU Cup in Idre at the end of 2022 was a success with 25th and 31st place, meaning that the Ukrainian was immediately invited for the World Cup in Hochfilzen and finished the sprint there in 89th place with four misses. Another podium in the IBU Junior Cup was followed by a bronze medal with Stepan Kinash, Oleksandra Merkushyna and Daryna Chalyk at the 2023 European Junior Championships later in the season. The summer of 2023 was also successful again, with Mandzyn winning silver in the sprint and bronze in the pursuit at the Summer Biathlon Junior World Championships. In the winter of 2023/24, Mandzyn called up to the squad for the World Cup stage in Oberhof and scored his first World Cup points in the sprint in 31st place despite a shooting miss, which he was able to confirm with 39th place in the pursuit. Vitalii finished his first relay alongside Artem Pryma, Dmytro Pidruchnyi and Anton Dudchenko in 13th place. In 2024, he won silver in the Mass Start 60 at the European Junior Championships and won the overall mass start standings at the IBU Junior Cup. At the World Junior Championships in Otepää, he won a silver medal in the Relay together with Stepan Kinash, Bohdan Borkovskyi and Serhii Suprun.

== Personal life ==
He started biathlon at the age of 11. Before that age, he practised aikido.

== Biathlon results ==
All results are sourced from the International Biathlon Union.

=== Olympic Games ===
0 medal

Event	Individual	Sprint	Pursuit	Mass start	Relay	Mixed relay
(Italy) 2026 Milano Cortina	28th	24th	16th	10th	16th	8th

=== World Championships ===
0 medals

Event	Individual	Sprint	Pursuit	Mass start	Relay	Mixed relay	Single mixed relay
(Switzerland) 2025 Lenzerheide	17th	36th	19th	27th	8th	—	—

=== World Cup ===
Season	Age	Overall			Individual		Sprint		Pursuit		Mass start	
Season	Age	Races	Points	Position	Points	Position	Points	Position	Points	Position	Points	Position
2022–23	19	2/21	Didn't earn World Cup points									
2023–24	20	6/21	12	76th	—	—	10	60th	22	77th	—	—
2024–25	21	17/21	230	31st	62	20th	87	26th	39	39th	42	30th
2025–26	22	19/21	250	25th	26	41st	86	26th	104	19th	34	29th

==== Relay podiums ====
- 1 podium

No.	Season	Date	Location	Level	Race	Placement	Teammate
1	2024–25	9 March 2025	(Czech Republic) Nové Město na Moravě	World Cup	Relay	3rd	Tyshchenko, Dudchenko, Pidruchnyi

=== Youth and Junior World Championships ===
1 medal (1 silver)

Year	Age	Individual	Sprint	Pursuit	Mass Start	Relay	Mixed relay
(Switzerland) 2020 Lenzerheide	16	24th	23rd	17th	N/A	7th	N/A
(Austria) 2021 Obertilliach	17	20th	20th	25th	N/A	10th	N/A
(Kazakhstan) 2023 Shchuchinsk	19	50th	21st	17th	N/A	11th	9th
(Estonia) 2024 Otepää	20	19th	10th	N/A	4th	Silver	8th
