= Marit Øygard =

Norwegian biathlete (born 1999)

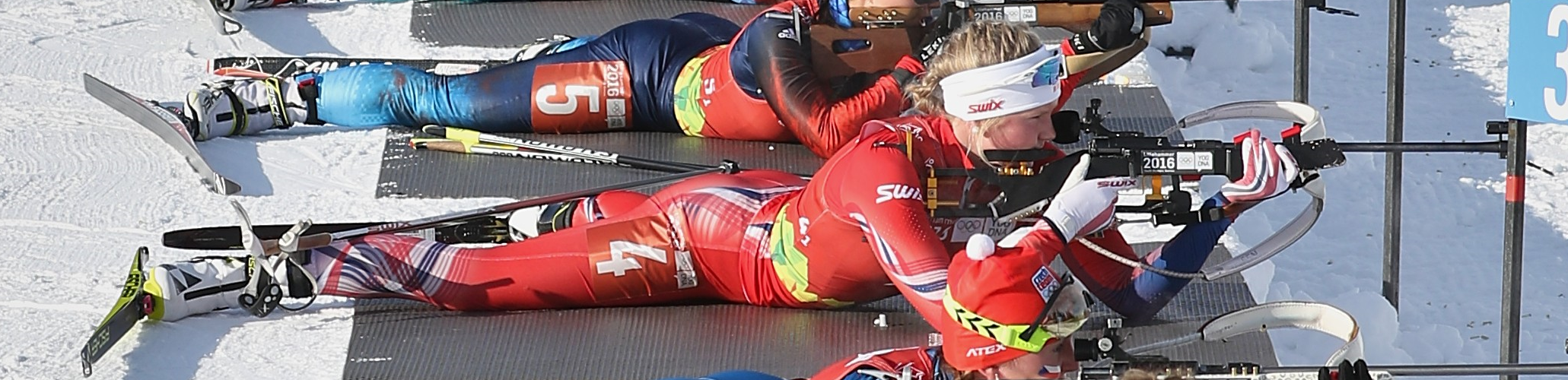
- Øygard in 2016

Personal information
- Nationality: Norwegian
- Born: 10 June 1999 (age 27) Tromsø, Norway

Sport
- Country: Norway
- Sport: Biathlon
Medal record
Women's biathlon
Representing Norway
Winter Youth Olympics
Gold medal – first place	2016 Lillehammer	Mixed Relay

Marit Øygard (born 10 June 1999) is a Norwegian biathlete. She made her debut in the Biathlon World Cup in 2024.

== Career ==
She competed in her first international races at the 2016 Winter Youth Olympics in Lillehammer, where she secured a gold medal in the mixed relay alongside Marthe Kråkstad Johansen, Fredrik Bucher-Johannessen, and Sivert Guttorm Bakken. Between 2016 and 2021, she participated in approximately a dozen international youth and junior events. At the Norwegian Biathlon Championships in 2022, Øygard, together with her brother Harald and teammate Vebjørn Sørum, won the mixed relay, marking the first victory in this event for the province of Oppland.

Øygard made her IBU Cup debut during the 2024/25 season. She earned a fifth-place finish in the sprint event at Geilo, shooting cleanly, though she fell short of the podium by one minute, finishing behind Paula Botet, Marlene Fichtner, Johanna Skottheim and Chloé Chevalier. After her successes in the second stage of the IBU Cup, Øygard was called up to the main national team for the World Cup stage in Hochfilzen, Austria, as a replacement for Ingrid Landmark Tandrevold, who is missing the event due to heart problems.

== Biathlon results ==
All results are sourced from the International Biathlon Union.

=== Youth and Junior World Championships ===
Year	Age	Individual	Sprint	Pursuit	Relay
(Estonia) 2018 Otepää	18	63rd	31st	37th	—
(Austria) 2021 Obertilliach	21	11th	24th	18th	5th
