= Ville di Fiemme =

- Comune
- Comune di Ville di Fiemme
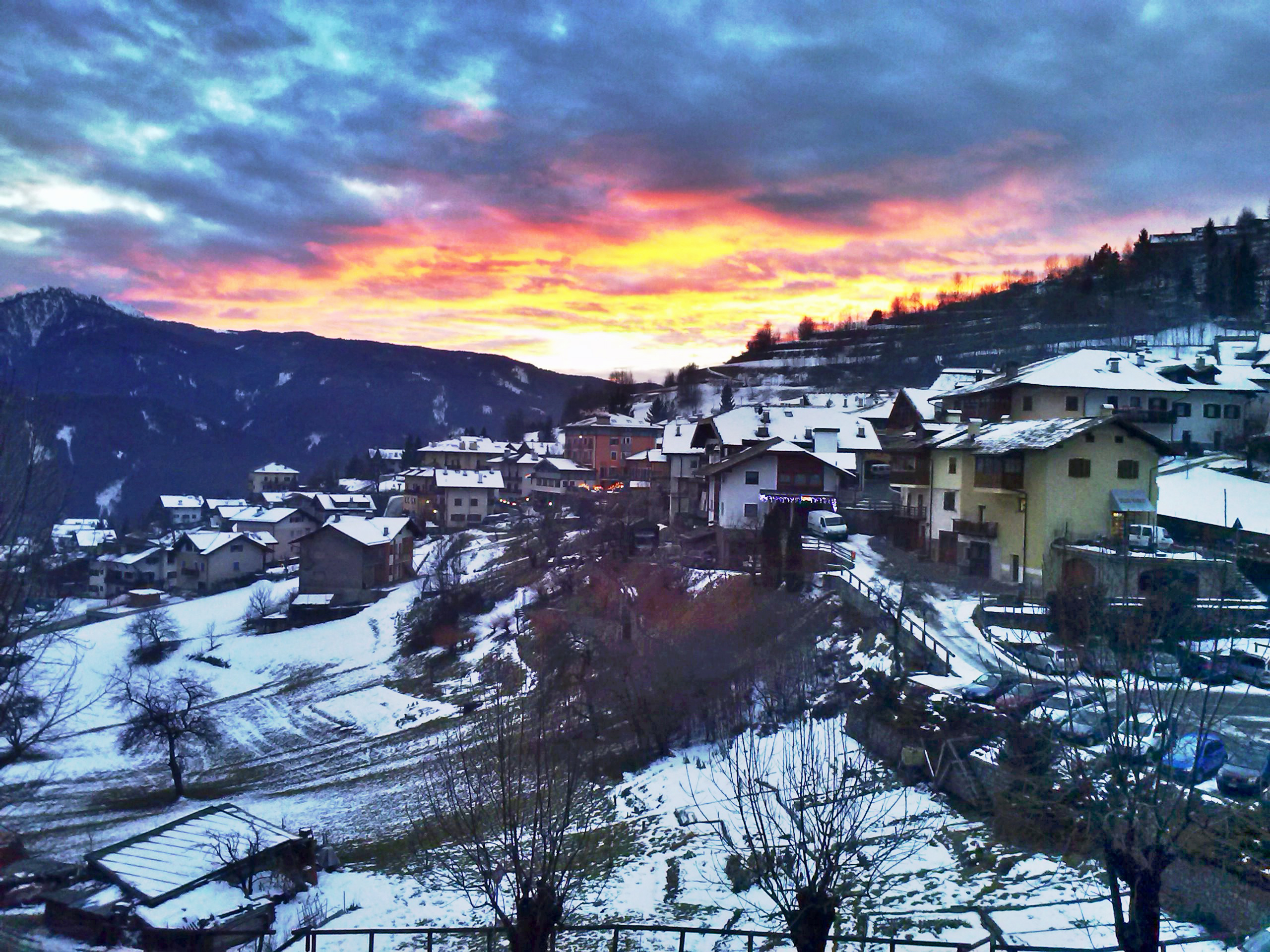

- Coat of arms

- Location within Italy Location within Trentino-Alto Adige/Südtirol
- Coordinates: 46°18′3″N 11°26′52″E
- Country: Italy
- Region: Trentino-Alto Adige/Südtirol
- Province: Trentino (TN)

Government
  - Mayor: Paride Gianmoena

Area
  - Total: 46.15 km^{2} (17.82 sq mi)

Population (31 December 2018)
  - Total: 2,596
  - Density: 56.25/km^{2} (145.7/sq mi)
- Time zone: UTC+1 (CET)
  - Summer (DST): UTC+2 (CEST)
- Dialing code: 0462
- Website: Official website

Ville di Fiemme is a comune (municipality) in the province of Trentino in the Italian region Trentino-Alto Adige/Südtirol. It was established on 1 January 2020 with the merger of the municipalities of Carano, Daiano and Varena.
