= Carano =

- Frazione
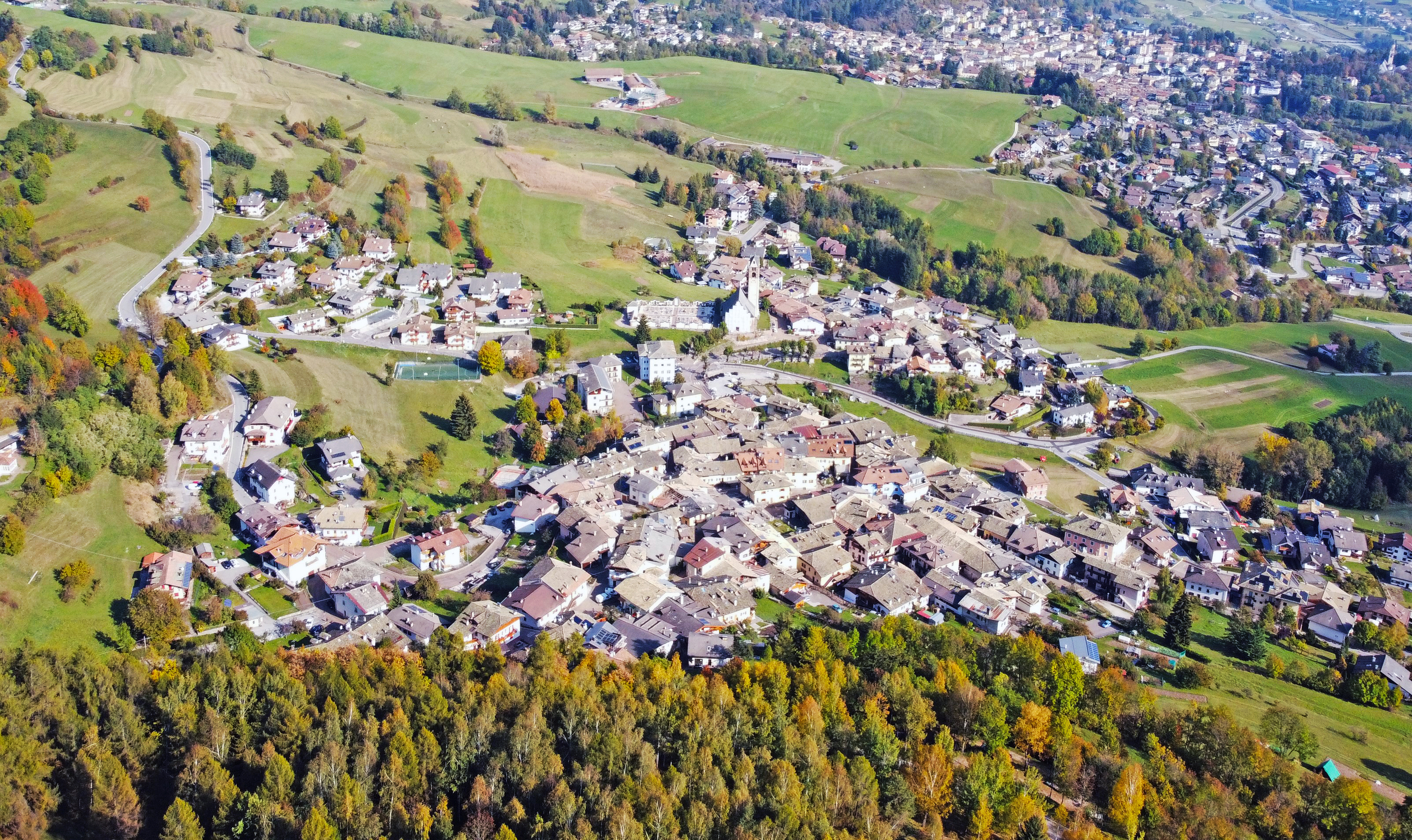
- Panoramic view

- Location of Carano in Italy
- Country: Italy
- Region: Trentino-Alto Adige/Südtirol
- Province: Trentino (TN)
- Comune: Ville di Fiemme
- Time zone: UTC+1 (CET)
  - Summer (DST): UTC+2 (CEST)

Carano (German: Kaldrein) is a frazione of the comune (municipality) of Ville di Fiemme in Trentino in the northern Italian region Trentino-Alto Adige/Südtirol, located about 35 kilometres (22 mi) northeast of Trento. It is known for its mineral water and its church, San Nicoló (St. Nicholas).

It was a separate municipality until 1 January 2020, when it was merged with Daiano and Varena.

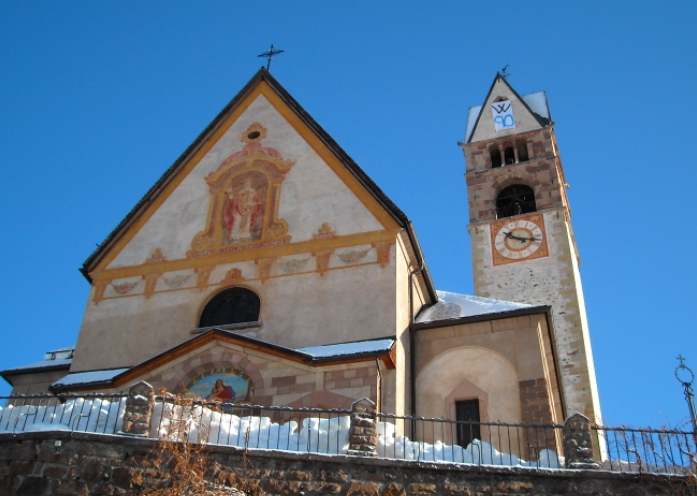
San Nicolò church
