= 2023 IBU Junior Open European Championships =

- Host city: Madona, Latvia
- Dates: 15–19 February
- Main venue: Smeceres sils
- Events: 8

The 8th IBU Junior Open European Championships were held from 15 to 19 February 2023 in Madona, Latvia.

== Schedule ==
All times are local (UTC+2).

Date	Time	Event
15 February	11:00	Men's 15 km individual
15 February	14:30	Women's 12.5 km individual
16 February	11:30	4 × 7.5 km M+W mixed relay
16 February	15:00	6 km M + 7.5 km W single mixed relay
18 February	11:00	Men's 10 km sprint
18 February	14:30	Women's 7.5 km sprint
19 February	12:00	Men's 12.5 km pursuit
19 February	15:00	Women's 10 km pursuit

== Medal summary ==
=== Medal table ===
Rank	Nation	Gold	Silver	Bronze	Total
1	Italy	3	0	2	5
2	France	2	3	2	7
3	Austria	2	1	0	3
4	Germany	1	1	2	4
5	Bulgaria	0	2	1	3
6	Czech Republic	0	1	0	1
7	Poland	0	0	1	1
7	Ukraine	0	0	1	1
Totals (8 entries)		8	8	9	25

=== Men ===
Event	Gold		Silver		Bronze	
15 km individual details	Hans Köllner; Germany	40:57.6 (0+0+0+0)	Blagoy Todev; Bulgaria	41:30.9 (0+0+0+1)	Fabio Piller Cottrer; Italy	41:51.1 (0+0+0+0)
10 km sprint details	Nicolò Betemps; Italy	27:47.5 (0+0)	Petr Hák; Czech Republic	28:20.2 (0+1)	Konrad Badacz; Poland	28:30.0 (0+0)
12.5 km pursuit details	Nicolò Betemps; Italy	33:42.4 (1+0+1+1)	Jacques Jefferies; France	34:31.8 (0+1+1+0)	Christoph Pircher; Italy	34:42.5 (1+1+0+0)

=== Women ===
Event	Gold		Silver		Bronze	
12.5 km individual details	Lea Rothschopf; Austria	41:36.3 (1+0+0+0)	Léonie Jeannier; France	41:53.3 (1+1+0+0)	Camille Coupé; France	42:03.8 (0+0+1+0)
7.5 km sprint details	Lara Wagner; Austria	24:10.3 (0+0)	Chloé Bened; France	24:13.5 (0+0)	Lora Hristova; Bulgaria Anaëlle Bondoux; France	24:21.7 (0+1) 24:21.7 (1+1)
10 km pursuit details	Anaëlle Bondoux; France	32:47.2 (0+1+0+2)	Lora Hristova; Bulgaria	33:36.8 (0+0+1+2)	Marlene Fichtner; Germany	34:10.0 (0+0+1+1)

=== Mixed ===
Event	Gold		Silver		Bronze	
6 km M + 7.5 km F single relay details	France Jacques Jefferies; Léonie Jeannier	37:37.3 (0+1) (0+2) (0+0) (0+3) (0+0) (0+0) (0+0) (0+0)	Austria Lukas Haslinger; Lea Rothschopf	37:52.5 (0+0) (0+0) (0+0) (0+0) (0+0) (0+1) (0+0) (0+3)	Germany Fabian Kaskel; Marlene Fichtner	37:52.9 (0+1) (0+2) (0+2) (0+0) (0+1) (0+0) (0+1) (0+1)
4 × 7.5 km M+W relay details	Italy Nicolò Betemps; Fabio Piller Cottrer; Fabiana Carpella; Sara Scattolo	1:20:34.0 (0+0) (0+3) (0+0) (0+2) (0+0) (0+3) (0+1) (0+0)	Germany Hans Köllner; Benjamin Menz; Magdalena Rieger; Johanna Puff	1:20:44.3 (0+0) (0+2) (0+0) (0+3) (0+0) (0+3) (0+2) (0+1)	Ukraine Stepan Kinash; Vitalii Mandzyn; Oleksandra Merkushyna; Daryna Chalyk	1:21:10.8 (0+1) (0+2) (0+1) (0+1) (0+0) (0+1) (0+0) (0+2)
