= Anna-Karin Heijdenberg =

Swedish biathlete (born 2000)

Personal information
- Nationality: Swedish
- Born: 22 June 2000 (age 26) Östersund, Sweden

Sport
- Country: Sweden
- Sport: Biathlon
Medal record
Women's biathlon
Representing Sweden
European Championships
| Gold medal – first place | 2025 Val Martello | 7.5 km sprint |
| Silver medal – second place | 2025 Val Martello | 10 km pursuit |
| Bronze medal – third place | 2025 Val Martello | 15 km individual |

Anna-Karin Heijdenberg (born 22 June 2000) is a Swedish biathlete. She made her debut in the Biathlon World Cup in 2024.

== Career ==
Anna-Karin Heijdenberg made her international debut in March 2019 in the IBU Junior Cup and also participated in the 2019 Junior European Championships in Sjusjøen. Three years later, she reappeared at the Junior World Championships in 2021 but did not feature prominently in the results. Her debut in the IBU Cup came at the beginning of 2022 in Osrblie, where she finished 66th in the sprint. At the end of the season, she once again participated in the Junior World Championships, finishing sixth with the relay team and 27th in the sprint and pursuit. After another winter without international race participation, Heijdenberg surprised everyone by finishing second behind Elvira Öberg at the preparation races in Idre in November 2023, thus qualifying for the IBU Cup team. She immediately impressed in the IBU Cup, for example, achieving second place in the mixed competition in Kontiolahti with Sara Andersson, Emil Nykvist, and Henning Sjökvist. Her first individual podium followed shortly after, as Heijdenberg secured third place in the sprint in Idre despite two shooting misses, thanks to a strong skiing performance.

At the end of the 2023/24 season, she was called up to the main team for the World Cup in Oslo, where she immediately got into the points zone with 25th place in the individual race. At the last World Cup stage in Canmore, she improved her best result with a 15th place in the sprint.

== Biathlon results ==
All results are sourced from the International Biathlon Union.

=== World Cup ===
| Season | Age | Overall | | | Individual | | Sprint | | Pursuit | | Mass start | |
| Season | Age | Races | Points | Position | Points | Position | Points | Position | Points | Position | Points | Position |
|---|---|---|---|---|---|---|---|---|---|---|---|---|
| 2023–24 | 23 | 4/21 | 42 | 65th | 16 | 51st | 26 | 52nd | — | — | — | — |
| 2024–25 | 24 | 15/21 | 171 | 39th | 82 | 11th | 35 | 52nd | 1 | 79th | 53 | 29th |
| 2025–26 | 25 | 14/21 | 254 | 26th | 28 | 36st | 116 | 19th | 81 | 29th | 29 | 36th |

==== Relay podiums ====
| No. | Season | Date | Location | Level | Race | Place | Teammate |
|---|---|---|---|---|---|---|---|
| 1 | 2024–25 | 15 December 2024 | (Austria) Hochfilzen | World Cup | Relay | 3rd | Magnusson, Halvarsson, E. Öberg |
| 2 | 2024–25 | 16 March 2025 | (Slovenia) Pokljuka | World Cup | Mixed Relay | 1st | H. Öberg, Ponsiluoma, Samuelsson |
| 3 | 2025-26 | 15 March 2026 | (Estonia) Otepää | World Cup | Mixed Relay | 1st | Brandt, Ponsiluoma, E. Öberg |

=== Youth and Junior World Championships ===
0 medals

| Year | Age | Individual | Sprint | Pursuit | Relay |
|---|---|---|---|---|---|
| (Austria) 2021 Obertilliach | 20 | 67th | 54th | 59th | — |
| (United States) 2022 Soldier Hollow | 21 | 42nd | 27th | 27th | 6th |
