= Varena, Trentino =

Varena
- Frazione
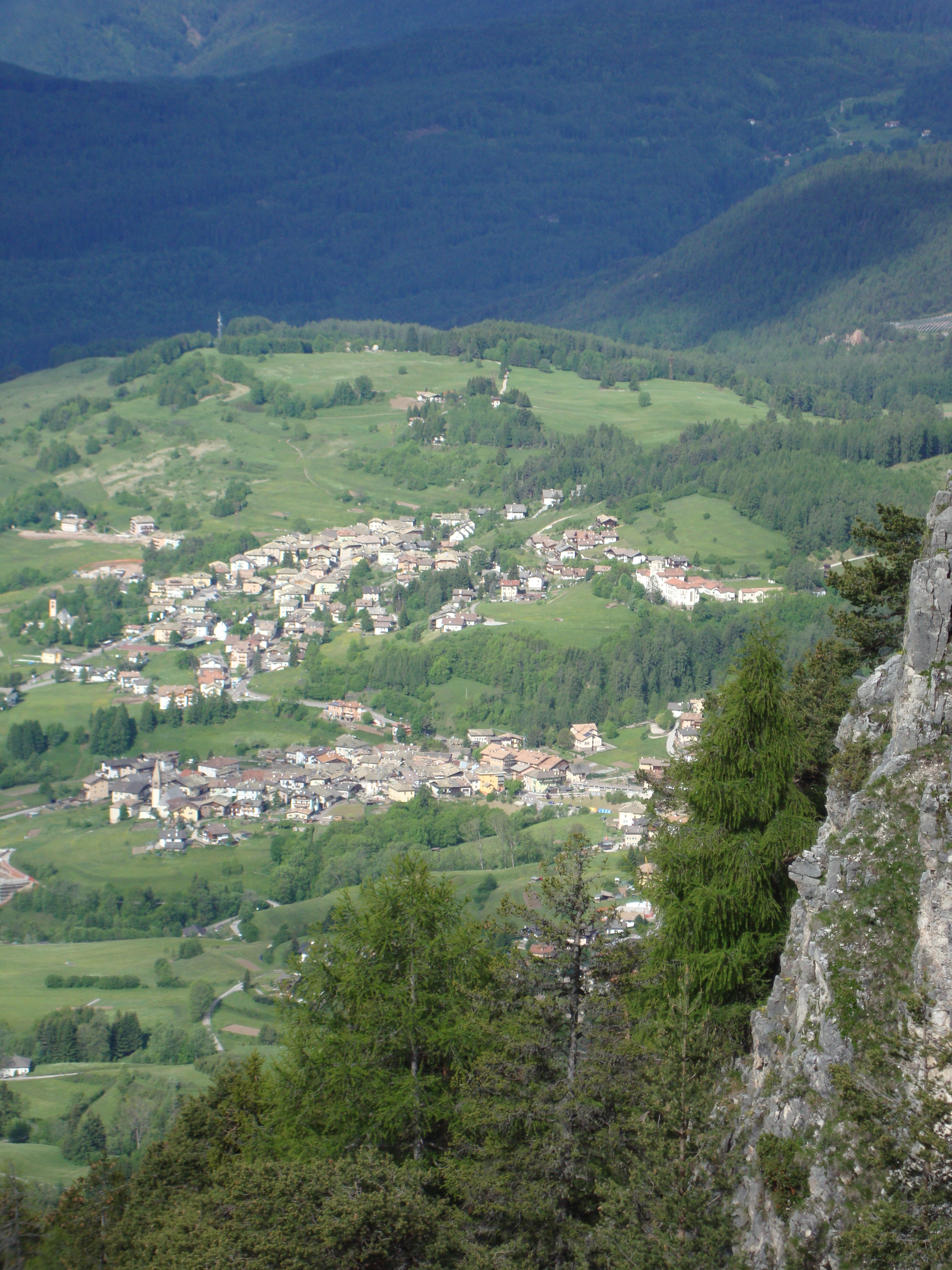
- Panoramic view

- Location of Varena in Italy
- Country: Italy
- Region: Trentino-Alto Adige/Südtirol
- Province: Trentino (TN)
- Comune: Ville di Fiemme
- Time zone: UTC+1 (CET)
  - Summer (DST): UTC+2 (CEST)

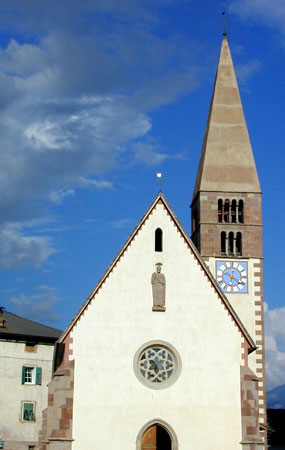
Local church with bell tower.

Varena is a frazione of the comune of Ville di Fiemme in Trentino in the northern Italian region Trentino-Alto Adige/Südtirol, about 35 kilometres (22 mi) northeast of Trento. It is a base for Alpine sports.

It was merged with the other former municipalities of Carano and Daiano on 1 January 2020.

== See also ==
- List of national parks in the Alps
