= Simon Kaiser (biathlete) =

German biathlete (born 1999)

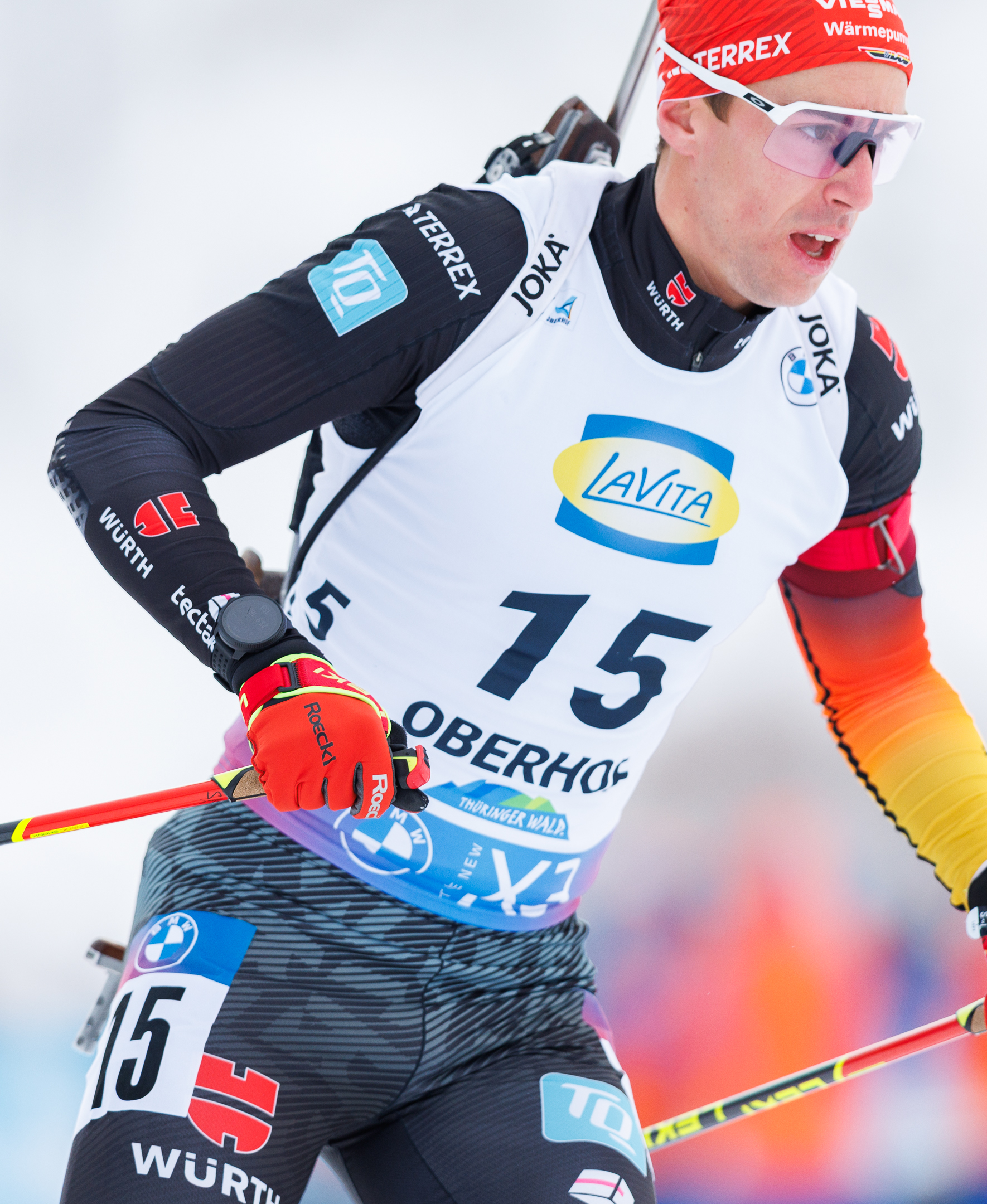
- Kaiser in 2025

Personal information
- Nationality: German
- Born: 20 June 1999 (age 27) Birkenfeld, Germany

Sport
- Country: Germany
- Sport: Biathlon
Medal record
Men's biathlon
Representing Germany
European Championships
Silver medal – second place	2025 Val Martello	4 × 7.5 km relay
Silver medal – second place	2026 Sjusjøen	4 × 7.5 km relay
Bronze medal – third place	2026 Sjusjøen	12.5 km pursuit

Simon Kaiser (born 20 June 1999) is a German biathlete. He made his debut in the Biathlon World Cup in 2024.

== Career ==
Kaiser, originally from Hoppstädten-Weiersbach in Rhineland-Palatinate, began training in biathlon at age 12 with the Biathlon Team Saarland in Lebach. At 14, he moved to the sports-focused high school in Oberhof to pursue the sport more professionally. After completing high school in 2018, he trained as a full-time police officer in Thuringia, graduating in 2020 as a Polizeimeister. Kaiser has represented WSV Oberhof 05 since 2014 and trains at the Oberhof performance center alongside IBU and World Cup athletes under coaches Jens Filbrich, Erik Lesser, and Marko Danz. Early in his youth career, Kaiser was not among the top German biathletes and often placed in the midfield of national competitions. Despite modest results, he steadily improved and joined the German Ski Association's (DSV) development squad in the 2020/21 season. In 2021, Kaiser competed in the Junior World Championships, narrowly missing a medal with fourth place in the sprint. He debuted in the IBU Cup the same season.

Transitioning to the senior level in 2021/22, Kaiser joined DSV's B-Team. Though initially failing to qualify for the IBU Cup, he earned multiple top-15 finishes later in the season and competed in the European Championships. The 2022/23 season saw Kaiser remain in the B-Team, earning silver at the German Championships and achieving consistent top-10 finishes in the IBU Cup, including a podium finish in the Canmore mass start. He finished the season ranked 17th in the IBU Cup standings. Promoted to the A-National Team for 2023/24, Kaiser continued competing in the IBU Cup due to missing World Cup qualification. He claimed his first IBU Cup victory in December 2023 in Sjusjøen and later achieved another podium at the Arber sprint. He ended the season ranked 8th in the IBU Cup overall standings. In preparation for 2024/25, Kaiser remained in the A-Team. After strong performances in the early IBU Cup races, including a podium in Geilo, he earned his first World Cup nomination for Hochfilzen as the best German in the IBU Cup standings.

== Biathlon results ==
All results are sourced from the International Biathlon Union.

=== Youth and Junior World Championships ===
Year	Age	Individual	Sprint	Pursuit	Relay
(Austria) 2021 Obertilliach	21	—	4th	26th	5th
