= Sivert Guttorm Bakken =

Norwegian biathlete (1998–2025)

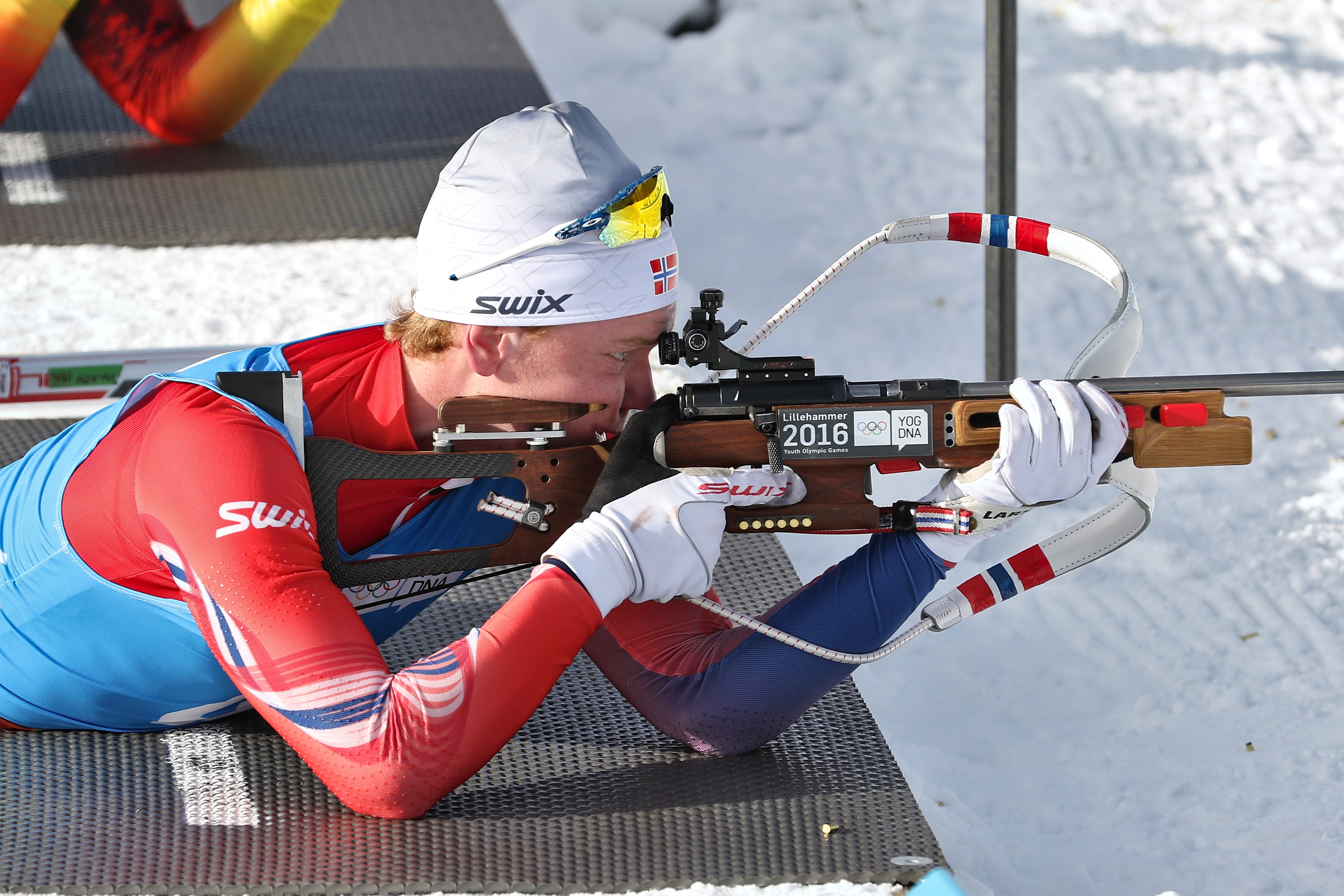
- Bakken in 2016

Personal information
- Full name: Sivert Guttorm Bakken
- Nationality: Norwegian
- Born: 18 July 1998 Lillehammer, Norway
- Died: 23 December 2025 (aged 27) Varena, Italy
- Height: 1.81 m (5 ft 11 in)
- Weight: 75 kg (165 lb)

Sport

Professional information
- Sport: Biathlon
- Club: Vingrom Il
- World Cup debut: 8 January 2021

World Cup
- Seasons: 2
- Individual races: 22
- All races: 25
- Individual victories: 1
- All victories: 4
- Individual podiums: 2
- All podiums: 5
- Discipline titles: 1 (Mass Start 2021/22)
Medal record
Men's biathlon
Representing Norway
European Championships
Gold medal – first place	2021 Duszniki-Zdrój	Mixed relay
Gold medal – first place	2025 Val Martello	10 km sprint
Gold medal – first place	2025 Val Martello	4 × 7.5 km relay
Bronze medal – third place	2020 Raubichi	12.5 km pursuit
Junior World Championships
Silver medal – second place	2018 Otepää	4 × 7.5 km relay
Bronze medal – third place	2019 Osrblie	10 km sprint
Bronze medal – third place	2019 Osrblie	12.5 km pursuit
Youth Olympic Games
Gold medal – first place	2016 Lillehammer	Pursuit
Gold medal – first place	2016 Lillehammer	Mixed relay
Silver medal – second place	2016 Lillehammer	Sprint
- Updated on 31 January 2025

Sivert Guttorm Bakken (18 July 1998 – 23 December 2025) was a Norwegian biathlete. He won the overall mass start title at the 2021–22 Biathlon World Cup.

== Career ==
Bakken won his first world cup race the same year, in the 15-kilometre mass start in Oslo Holmenkollen, on 20 March 2022.

After a successful 2021–2022 season, Bakken was unable to return to competition the following season due to a heart problem, pericarditis. He announced his intent to hopefully return during the 2023–2024 season, having resumed training, and he competed in several World Cup races in late 2025.

== Personal life and death ==
Bakken was found dead in his hotel room in Lavaze, Trentino, Italy, on 23 December 2025, by his teammate Johan-Olav Botn. He was 27, and had been in Italy to prepare for the 2026 Winter Olympics.

As of February 2026, no cause of death has been reported publicly. Results of an autopsy are expected in March.

When Botn won gold at the men's 20km individual biathlon at the Winter Olympics in February, he turned to cameras at the finish line and said "Sivert, we've done it".

At the 2026 Winter Olympics, his former teammate Johan-Olav Botn dedicated his gold medal in the men's 20 km individual biathlon to Bakken. Botn had shouted Bakken's name as he crossed the finish line in Cortina.

== Biathlon results ==
All results are sourced from the International Biathlon Union.

=== World Cup ===
Season	Overall		Individual	Sprint	Pursuit	Mass start
Season	Points	Position	Position	Position	Position	Position
2020–21	25	70th	–	66th	70th	–
2021–22	553	9th	12th	18th	15th	1st
2025–26	224	26th	15th	25th	35th	33rd

==== Individual podiums ====
- 1 victory (1 mass start)
- 2 podiums

Season	Date	Location	Discipline	Place
2021–22	12 March 2022	(Estonia) Otepää	15 km Mass Start	3rd
2021–22	20 March 2022	(Norway) Oslo Holmenkollen	15 km Mass Start	1st
