= Emil Nykvist =

Swedish biathlete (born 1997)

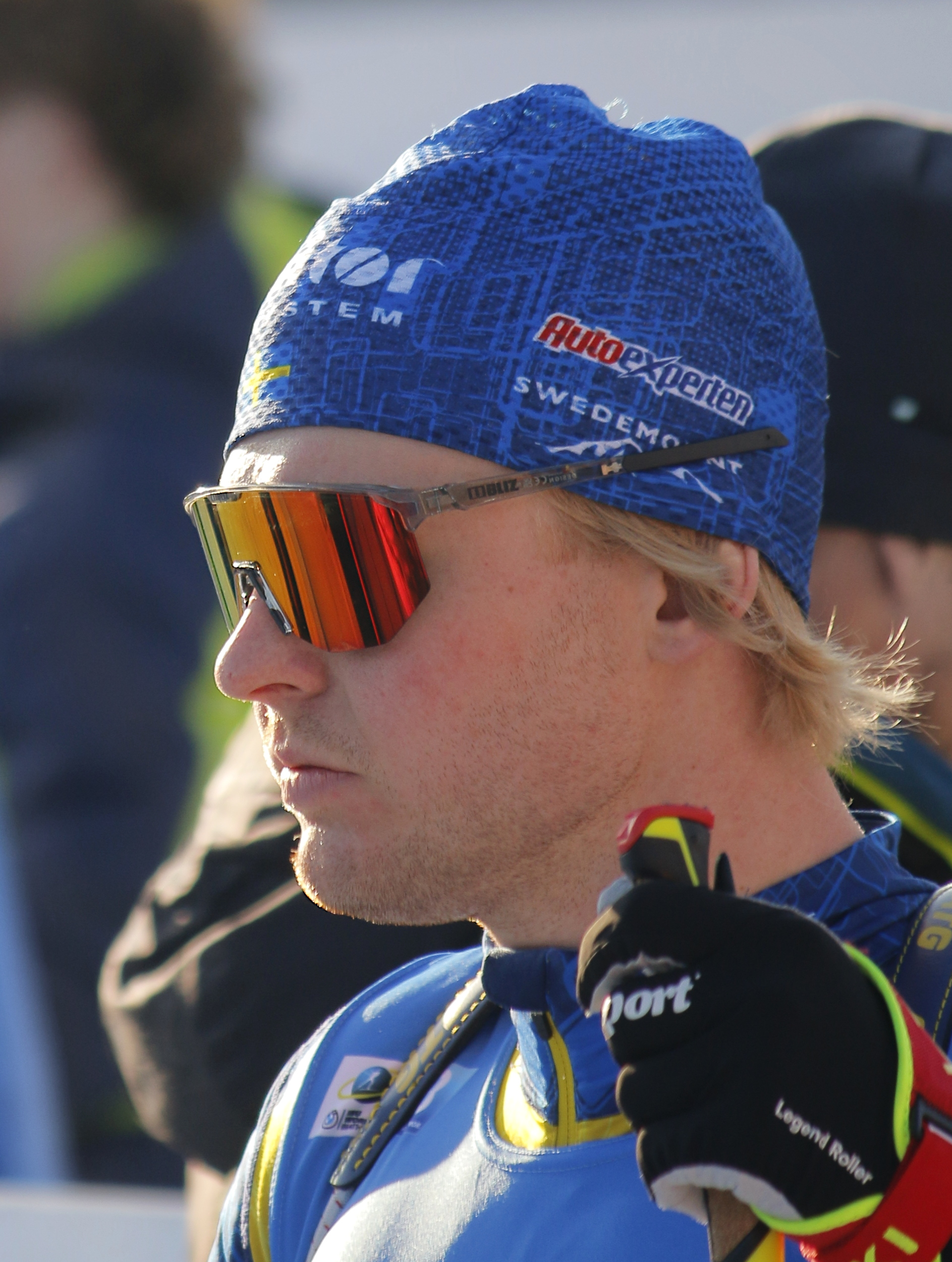
- Nykvist in 2023

Personal information
- Nationality: Swedish
- Born: 25 March 1997 (age 29) Sunne, Sweden

Sport
- Country: Sweden
- Sport: Biathlon
Medal record
Representing Sweden
Men's biathlon
European Championships
Bronze medal – third place	2025 Val Martello	20 km individual

Emil Nykvist (born 25 March 1997) is a Swedish biathlete. He has competed in the Biathlon World Cup since 2021.

== Career ==
Emil Nykvist has been competing in biathlon since 2013 but initially participated in national cross-country skiing competitions as a junior. His best result in this discipline was a third-place finish in May 2016 in Torsby. That same year, he took part in the Youth World Championships for the first time, with his best result being 26th place in the sprint. The year before, he had already competed in the Olympic Youth Festival.

In early 2018, the Swedish athlete made his debut in the IBU Cup in Osrblie, though he primarily participated in Junior World Championships until 2019. During the 2019/20 season, Nykvist competed in the IBU Cup but only rarely finished in the points. After hardly competing in the 2020/21 season, he improved significantly the following winter. Following several top-30 finishes, he made his first World Cup appearance in Hochfilzen, finishing 84th in the sprint. In March 2022, Nykvist achieved his first IBU Cup podium finish, securing third place in a mixed relay in Ridnaun alongside Ingela Andersson, Elisabeth Högberg, and Henning Sjökvist. Notably, he led his relay leg.

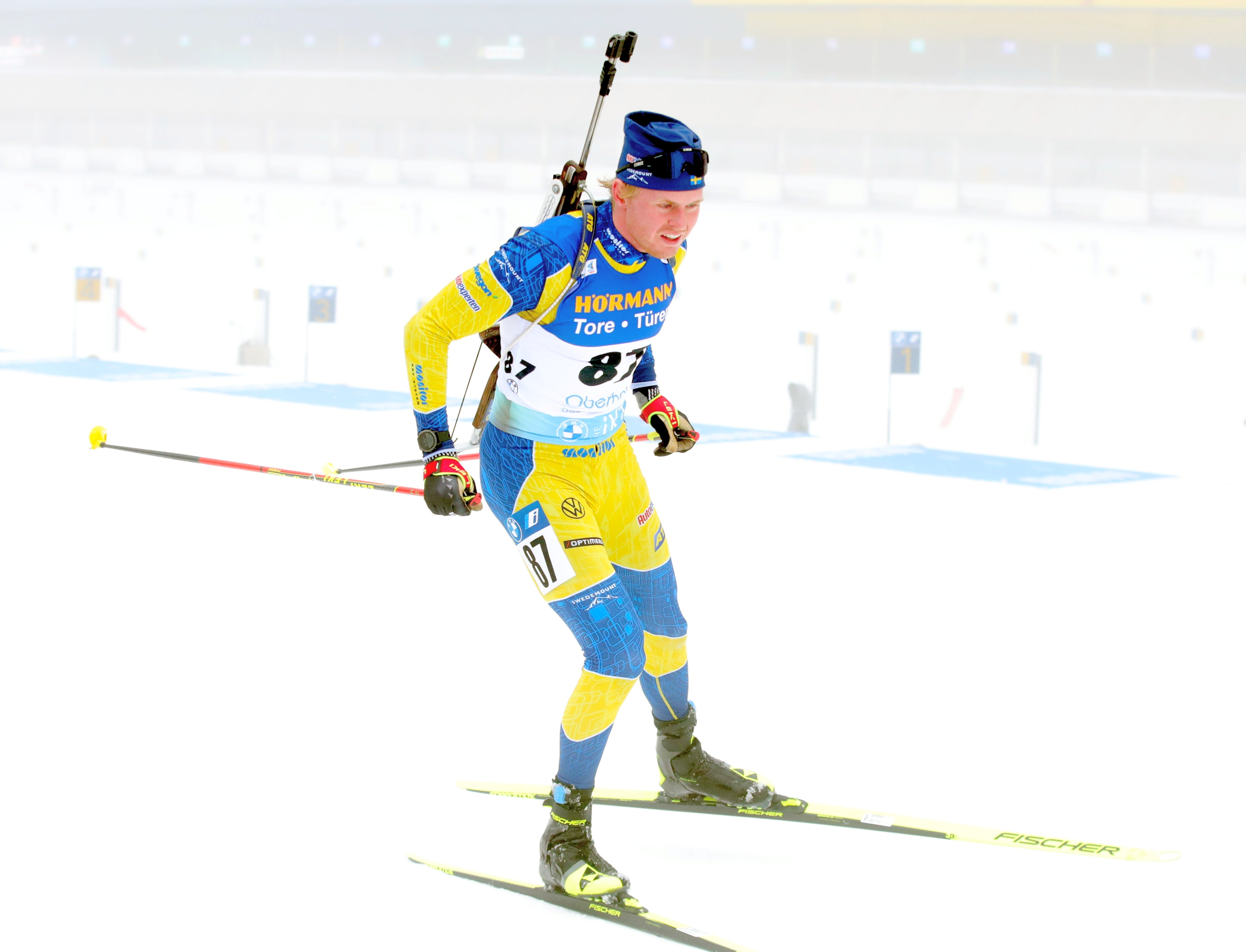
Nykvist during the World Championship sprint in Oberhof.

Starting in the 2022/23 season, Nykvist became a regular member of the Swedish World Cup team. He earned his first World Cup points in the individual race in Kontiolahti and the sprint in Hochfilzen. His best result of the season was 27th place in the sprint in Pokljuka. At the World Championships in Oberhof, he competed in the individual and sprint events. However, illness forced him to miss the final two World Cup stops, and he finished the season ranked 69th in the overall standings.

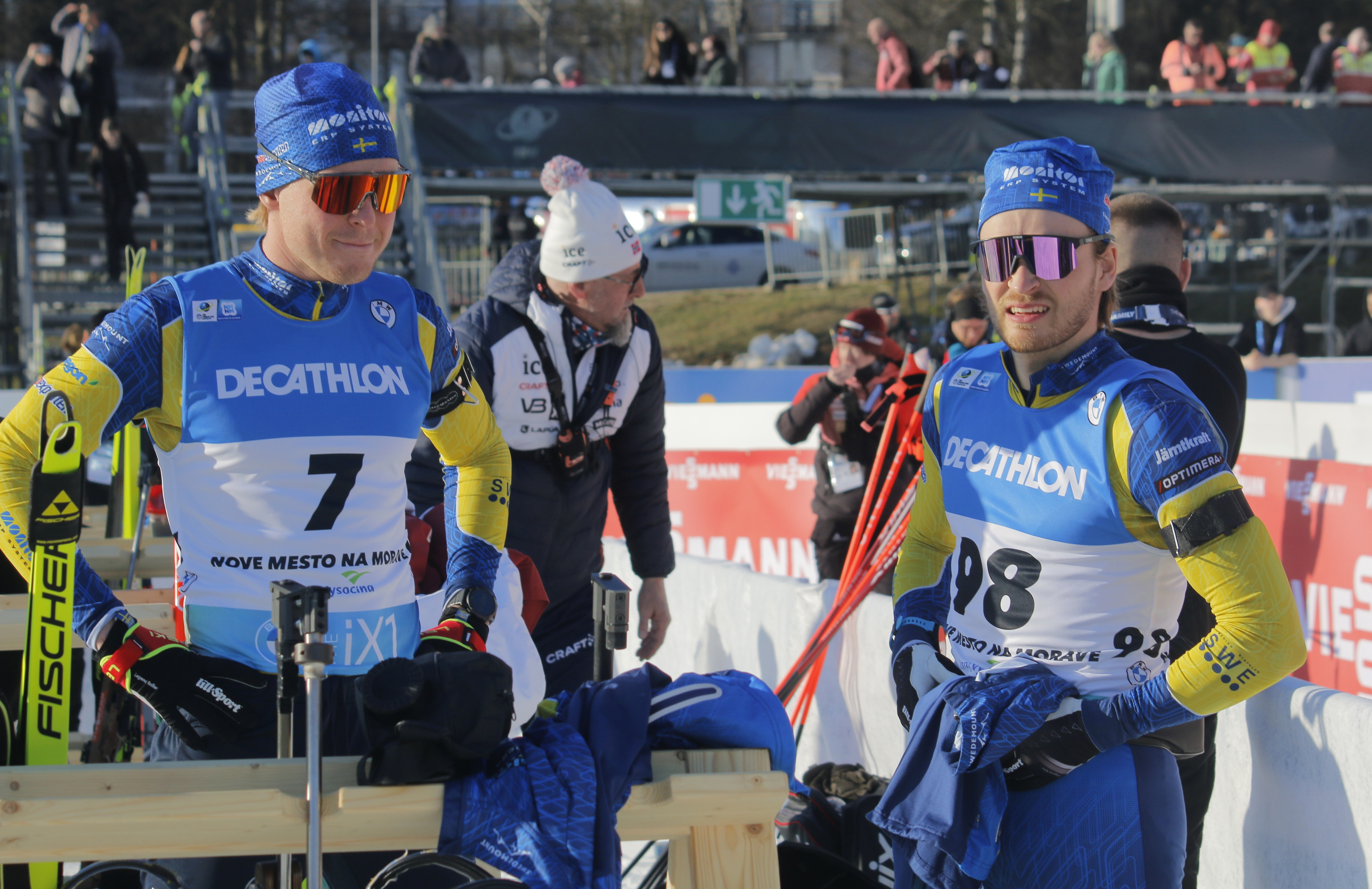
Nykvist (left) and Malte Stefansson in 2023 in Nové Město.

At the beginning of the 2023/24 season, Nykvist delivered strong performances in the IBU Cup, achieving two top-10 results and a podium finish in the mixed relay. This earned him World Cup starts in December and January, where he narrowly missed the podium with the Swedish men's relay team in Oberhof. At the same venue, he matched his best-ever individual result by finishing 27th in the pursuit. Despite these performances, he was dropped from the national team at the end of January 2024 and returned to the IBU Cup and European Championships, where he finished outside the top 30.

During the 2025 European Championships in Martell-Val Martello, he reached the third place in the individual race with one missed shot.

== Personal life ==
Nykvist lives in his hometown of Sunne and at the biathlon training center in Östersund. He is in a relationship with his former teammate Stina Nilsson.

== Biathlon results ==
All results are sourced from the International Biathlon Union.

=== World Championships ===
Event	Individual	Sprint	Pursuit	Mass start	Relay	Mixed relay	Single mixed relay
(Germany) 2023 Oberhof	49th	84th	—	—	—	—	—

=== World Cup ===
Season	Overall			Individual		Sprint		Pursuit		Mass start	
Season	Races	Points	Position	Points	Position	Points	Position	Points	Position	Points	Position
2021–22	1/22	Didn't earn World Cup points									
2022–23	12/21	27	69th	3	62nd	23	51st	1	74th	—	—
2023–24	6/21	16	73rd	—	—	2	74th	14	56th	—	—

=== Youth and Junior World Championships ===
Year	Age	Individual	Sprint	Pursuit	Relay
(Romania) 2016 Cheile Gradistei	18	48th	26th	30th	11th
(Slovakia) 2017 Brezno-Osrblie	19	58th	59th	49th	11th
(Estonia) 2018 Otepää	20	18th	40th	30th	12th
(Slovakia) 2019 Brezno-Osrblie	21	19th	25th	26th	14th
