= Sverre Dahlen Aspenes =

Norwegian biathlete (born 1997)

Personal information
- Nationality: Norwegian
- Born: 20 June 1997 (age 29) Skatval, Norway

Sport
- Country: Norway
- Sport: Biathlon
Medal record
Men's biathlon
Representing Norway
European Championships
Gold medal – first place	2022 Arber	20 km individual
Gold medal – first place	2022 Arber	12.5 km pursuit
Gold medal – first place	2025 Val Martello	4 × 7.5 km relay
Bronze medal – third place	2025 Val Martello	12.5 km pursuit
Junior World Championships
Gold medal – first place	2018 Otepää	12.5 km Pursuit
Bronze medal – third place	2018 Otepää	10 km Sprint

Sverre Dahlen Aspenes (born 20 June 1997) is a Norwegian biathlete. He made his debut in the Biathlon World Cup in 2022. Aspenes is a two-time European 2022 champion in the individual and pursuit races.

== Career ==
Sverre Dahlen Aspenes entered the biathlon sport in 2007, but he didn't make his international debut until relatively late. Initially, he competed in cross-country skiing at the national junior championships in 2015 and 2016. Aspenes made his first biathlon appearances at the Junior European Championships in 2017 in Nové Město na Moravě. Just a year later, the Norwegian won his first international title, unexpectedly triumphing in the pursuit race at the 2018 Junior World Championships. Additionally, he secured a bronze medal in the sprint. Aspenes made his debut in the IBU Cup three years later in Obertilliach, immediately achieving a good result with 12th place in the sprint.

Aspenes' breakthrough came in the 2021/22 season. Before the turn of the year, he already had a podium finish and another top-10 result to his name, earning him a place alongside three other athletes as a replacement for the absent A-team in the Biathlon World Cup in Ruhpolding. With the relay team, he finished seventh, and he earned his first World Cup points by finishing 25th in the pursuit. The following 2022 European Championships at Arber brought further success, with Aspenes winning gold in the individual and pursuit events, making him the most successful athlete of the championships. After another victory in the IBU Cup, Aspenes concluded his season in Kontiolahti and Oslo in the World Cup, achieving more placements around the top 30 and finishing 62nd overall. In the IBU Cup rankings, he ended the season in third place behind Erlend Bjøntegaard and Håvard Bogetveit.

In contrast to the previous winter, the 2022/23 season was relatively unsuccessful for Aspenes for personal reasons. He only competed in the IBU Cup in Idre and managed to achieve top-10 finishes three times. As defending champion, he could not surpass 14th place in the pursuit at the European Championships. However, he ended the season by becoming the Norwegian champion in the sprint, comfortably distancing himself from Vetle Paulsen and Johannes Thingnes Bø. He finished second behind Bø in the mass start. In the winter of 2023/24, Aspenes mainly competed at the national level and only joined the IBU Cup for the season finale in Obertilliach, where he dominated the race times and secured his second victory at that level after two podium finishes in the season-ending mass start event.

== Personal life ==
Aspenes lives at the biathlon training center in Lillehammer. He had a younger brother Knut who took his own life in the summer of 2022, prompting Aspenes to skip almost the entire 2022/23 season.

== Biathlon results ==
All results are sourced from the International Biathlon Union.

=== World Cup ===
Season	Overall			Individual		Sprint		Pursuit		Mass start	
Season	Races	Points	Position	Points	Position	Points	Position	Points	Position	Points	Position
2021–22	6/22	61	62nd	—	—	21	69th	40	42nd	—	—
2025–26	9/21	220	27th	37	33rd	36	47th	52	36th	95	15th

==== Individual podiums ====
- 1 podium

No.	Season	Date	Location	Level	Race	Place
1	2025–26	25 January 2026	(Czech Republic) Nové Město na Moravě	World Cup	Mass Start	3rd

=== Youth and Junior World Championships ===
2 medals (1 gold, 1 bronze)

Year	Age	Individual	Sprint	Pursuit	Relay
(Estonia) 2018 Otepää	20	—	Bronze	Gold	—

=== European Championships ===
4 medals (3 gold, 1 bronze)

Year	Age	Individual	Sprint	Pursuit	Single Mixed Relay	Relay
(Germany) 2022 Arber	24	Gold	7th	Gold	5th	—N/a
(Switzerland) 2023 Lenzerheide	25	44th	17th	14th	—	—N/a
(Italy) 2025 Val Martello	27	20th	4th	Bronze	—N/a	Gold
