= Marlene Fichtner =

German biathlete (born 2003)

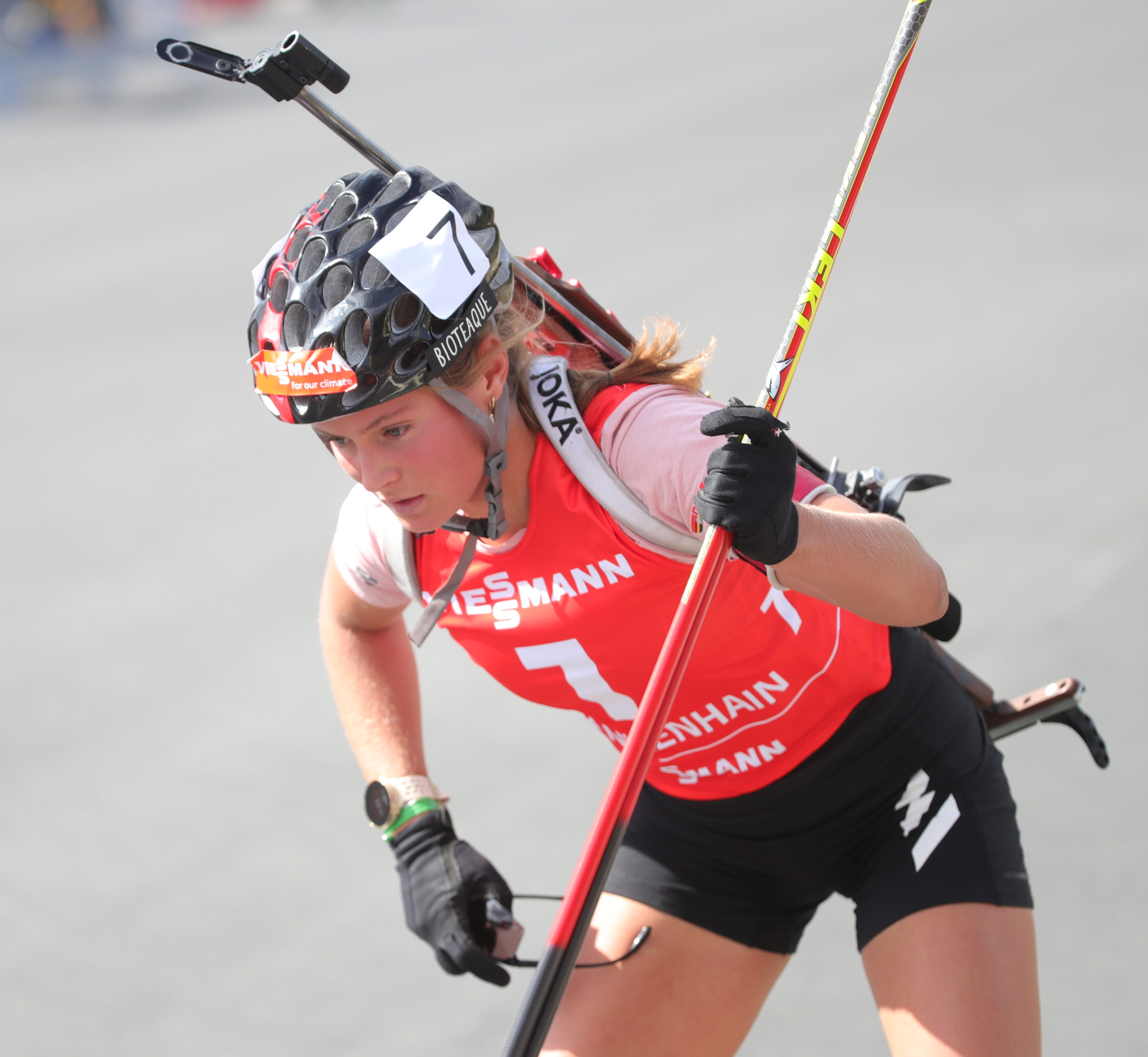
- Fichtner in 2022

Personal information
- Nationality: German
- Born: 16 March 2003 (age 23)

Sport
- Country: Germany
- Sport: Biathlon
Medal record
Women's biathlon
Representing Germany
European Championships
Gold medal – first place	2025 Val Martello	4 × 6 km relay
Silver medal – second place	2025 Val Martello	15 km individual
Silver medal – second place	2026 Sjusjøen	4 × 6 km relay
Junior World Championships
Gold medal – first place	2023 Shchuchinsk	4 × 6 km relay
Gold medal – first place	2024 Otepää	4 × 6 km relay
Silver medal – second place	2024 Otepää	4 × 6 km mixed relay
Youth World Championships
Silver medal – second place	2022 Soldier Hollow	3 × 6 km relay
- Updated on 2 February 2025

Marlene Fichtner (born 16 March 2003) is a German biathlete. She made her debut in the Biathlon World Cup in 2024.

== Career ==
Marlene Fichtner competes for the Ski-Club Traunstein and trains in Ruhpolding under Andreas Birnbacher. After graduating from Chiemgau-Gymnasium in 2021, she was supported by the Bavarian State Police before joining the Zoll-Ski-Team. She gained national recognition in the German Schülercup and later in the Deutschlandpokal, securing multiple wins. Her international debut came at the 2020 Youth Olympic Games. In 2022, she won silver in the relay at the Youth World Championships. In the 2022/23 season, Fichtner transitioned to the junior level, achieving multiple podiums in the IBU Junior Cup and winning bronze at the Junior European Championships. She also became Junior World Champion in the relay. During the 2023/24 season, she made her international senior debut at the European Championships, finishing fifth in the pursuit. At the 2024 Junior World Championships, she won two more relay medals (gold and silver). In summer 2024, she was promoted to the German B-National Team. Her 2024/25 season started with strong performances in the IBU Cup, including a victory in Geilo, leading to her World Cup debut in Hochfilzen. She later returned to the IBU Cup and won silver at the 2025 European Championships in Val Martello.

== Biathlon results ==
All results are sourced from the International Biathlon Union.

=== World Cup ===
Season	Overall		Individual	Sprint	Pursuit	Mass start
Season	Races	Position	Position	Position	Position	Position
2024–25	2/21	Did not earn World Cup points				
2025–26	21/21	36th	13th	67th	48th	18th

=== Youth and Junior World Championships ===
4 medals (2 gold, 2 silver)

Year	Age	Individual	Sprint	Pursuit	Mass Start	Relay	Mixed relay
(United States) 2022 Soldier Hollow	18	8th	28th	17th	N/A	Silver	N/A
(Kazakhstan) 2023 Shchuchinsk	19	23rd	19th	11th	N/A	Gold	—
(Estonia) 2024 Otepää	20	23rd	7th	N/A	14th	Gold	Silver
