= 2025–26 Biathlon World Cup – Stage 3 =

2025–26 Biathlon World Cup Stage

The 2025–26 Biathlon World Cup – Stage 3 was the third event of the season and was held in Le Grand-Bornand, France, from 15 to 21 December 2025. The event consisted of three individual competitions.

== Stage overview ==
Ahead of the 2025–26 Biathlon World Cup stage in Le Grand-Bornand, national federations published their team selections for the French leg of the circuit, with several notable returns, withdrawals and first-time call-ups across the field.

Germany have announced their squad, with Franziska Preuß returning and replacing Marlene Fichtner. Selina Grotian continues to miss races due to illness. Sweden have confirmed several changes to their team: Oskar Andersson has received his first call-up to the World Cup, while Viktor Brandt has been replaced by Henning Sjökvist. Anna-Karin Heijdenberg has been included in the main team following her success at the IBU Cup. Linn Gestblom has returned home for training and will not take part in the races at this stage. France announced its home selection with Paula Botet and Valentin Lejeune, while Jeanne Richard was entered only for the mass start, limiting her participation at this stage. Norway keeping seven men in the squad, while the women's group remained unchanged compared to the previous World Cup stage. Shortly afterward, a late adjustment was required as Martin Uldal withdrew, with Isak Frey confirmed to start in the sprint. Slovenia confirmed the return of Anamarija Lampič after illness, selecting a total of seven athletes for Le Grand-Bornand. Finland unveiled its squad with Suvi Minkkinen leading the team and Otto Invenius earning his first selection of the season. Latvia selected six athletes, highlighted by the return of Andrejs Rastorgujevs.

== Schedule of events ==
The events took place at the following times.

Date	Time	Events
18 December	15:15 CET	Women's 7.5 km Sprint
19 December	15:15 CET	Men's 10 km Sprint
20 December	13:10 CET	Women's 10 km Pursuit
20 December	15:45 CET	Men's 12.5 km Pursuit
21 December	13:15 CET	Women's 12.5 km Mass Start
21 December	15:45 CET	Men's 15 km Mass Start

== Medal winners ==
=== Men ===
Event:	Gold:	Time	Silver:	Time	Bronze:	Time
10 km Sprint	Vetle Sjåstad Christiansen; Norway	25:00.6 (0+0)	Johannes Dale-Skjevdal; Norway	25:04.1 (1+1)	Émilien Jacquelin; France	25:05.6 (0+1)
12.5 km Pursuit	Johan-Olav Botn; Norway	31:20.8 (0+0+0+0)	Émilien Jacquelin; France	+17.6 (1+1+1+0)	Johannes Dale-Skjevdal; Norway	+17.9 (0+0+0+2)
15 km Mass Start	Tommaso Giacomel; Italy	33:35.1 (1+0+0+0)	Éric Perrot; France	+18.1 (0+0+0+0)	Vetle Sjåstad Christiansen; Norway	+21.3 (1+1+0+0)

=== Women ===
Event:	Gold:	Time	Silver:	Time	Bronze:	Time
7.5 km Sprint	Hanna Öberg; Sweden	19:24.9 (0+0)	Lou Jeanmonnot; France	19:28.2 (0+0)	Dorothea Wierer; Italy	19:36.3 (0+0)
10 km Pursuit	Lou Jeanmonnot; France	27:58.8 (0+0+0+1)	Suvi Minkkinen; Finland	+30.2 (0+0+0+0)	Dorothea Wierer; Italy	+32.7 (0+0+1+0)
12.5 km Mass Start	Maren Kirkeeide; Norway	32:53.2 (1+0+0+0)	Lou Jeanmonnot; France	+0.3 (0+0+0+1)	Justine Braisaz-Bouchet; France	+0.8 (0+0+0+1)

== Achievements ==
Best individual performance for all time

Men

- (Poland) Jan Gunka (23) reached No. 13 on pursuit race
- (Germany) Simon Kaiser (26) reached No. 23 on sprint race
- (Czech Republic) Mikuláš Karlík (26) reached No. 24 on pursuit race
- (Poland) Konrad Badacz (22) reached No. 25 on pursuit race
- (Ukraine) Bohdan Borkovskyi (21) reached No. 28 on sprint race
- (Sweden) Henning Sjökvist (27) reached No. 29 on sprint race
- (Sweden) Oscar Andersson (23) reached No. 32 on sprint race
- (China) Xingyuan Yan (29) reached No. 36 on sprint race
- (United Kingdom) Jacques Jefferies (23) reached No. 53 on sprint race
- (Switzerland) James Pacal (22) reached No. 66 on sprint race
- (Slovakia) Martin Matko (20) reached No. 79 on sprint race
- (Japan) Masaharu Yamamoto (25) reached No. 83 on sprint race
- (Belgium) Sam Parmantier (20) reached No. 85 on sprint race

Women

- (Norway) Maren Kirkeeide (22) reached No. 1 on mass start race
- (Italy) Rebecca Passler (24) reached No. 11 on mass start race
- (Austria) Anna Andexer (22) reached No. 24 on sprint race
- (Norway) Åsne Skrede (25) reached No. 35 on sprint race
- (Slovakia) Mária Remeňová (25) reached No. 46 on sprint race
- (Switzerland) Coralie Langel (24) reached No. 82 on sprint race
- (Czech Republic) Heda Mikolášová (19) reached No. 84 on sprint race
- (Lithuania) Sara Urumova (24) reached No. 101 on sprint race

First World Cup individual race

Men

- (Sweden) Oscar Andersson (23) reached No. 32 on sprint race
- (United Kingdom) Jacques Jefferies (23) reached No. 53 on sprint race

Women

- (Norway) Åsne Skrede (25) reached No. 35 on sprint race
- (Switzerland) Coralie Langel (24) reached No. 82 on sprint race
- (Lithuania) Sara Urumova (24) reached No. 101 on sprint race
