= 2025–26 Biathlon World Cup – Stage 8 =

2025–26 Biathlon World Cup Stage

The 2025–26 Biathlon World Cup – Stage 8 was the eighth event of the season and was held in Otepää, Estonia, from 9 to 15 March 2026. The event consisted of four individual competitions and two mixed relay races. After all the races of the stage, Éric Perrot leads the overall World Cup standings for men, and Lou Jeanmonnot leads for women. U-23 World Cup ranking leaders after the events in Otepää were Isak Frey for men and Maren Kirkeeide for the women.

== Stage overview ==
Overall World Cup standings leaders after stage 8

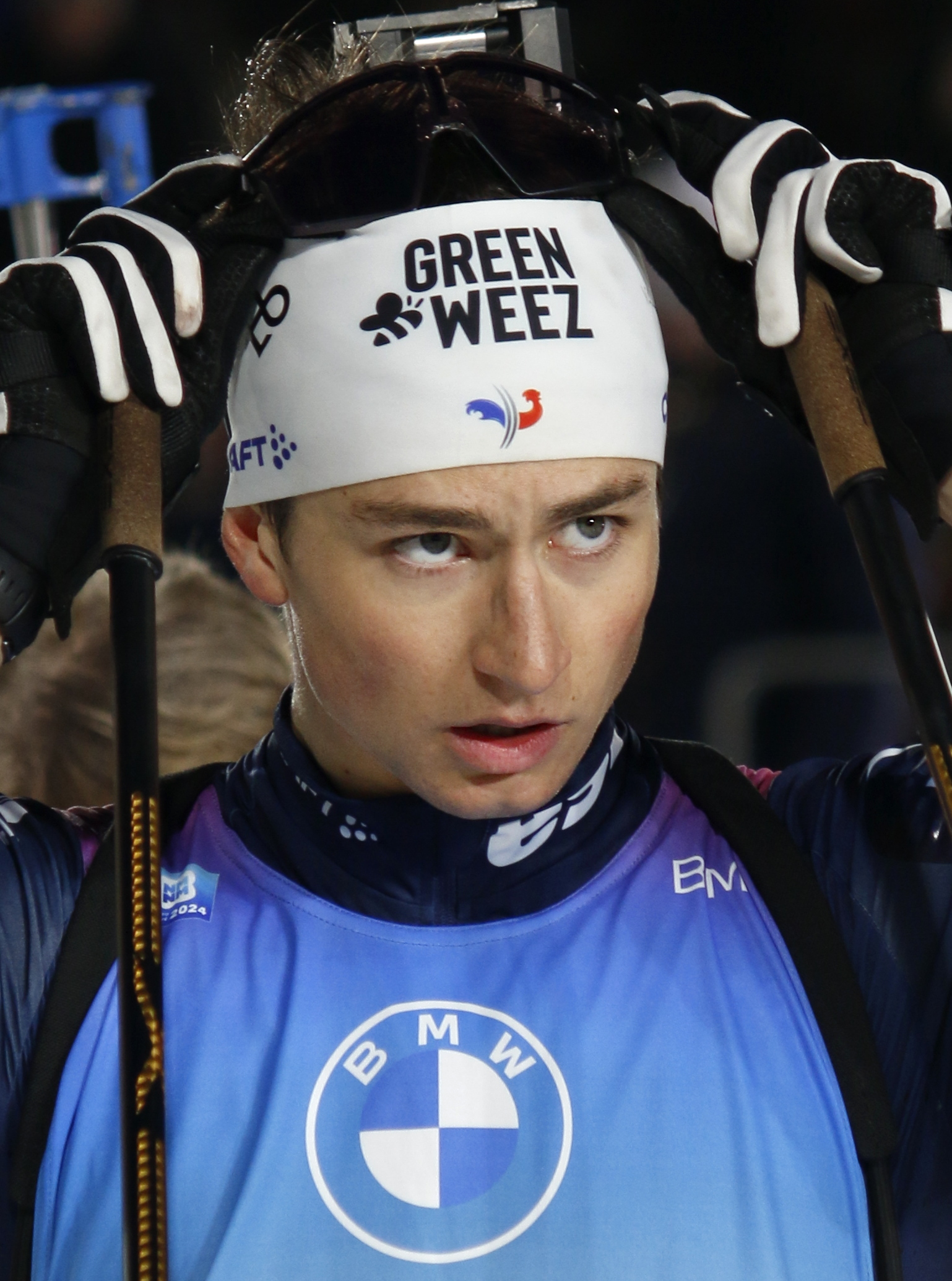
Éric Perrot

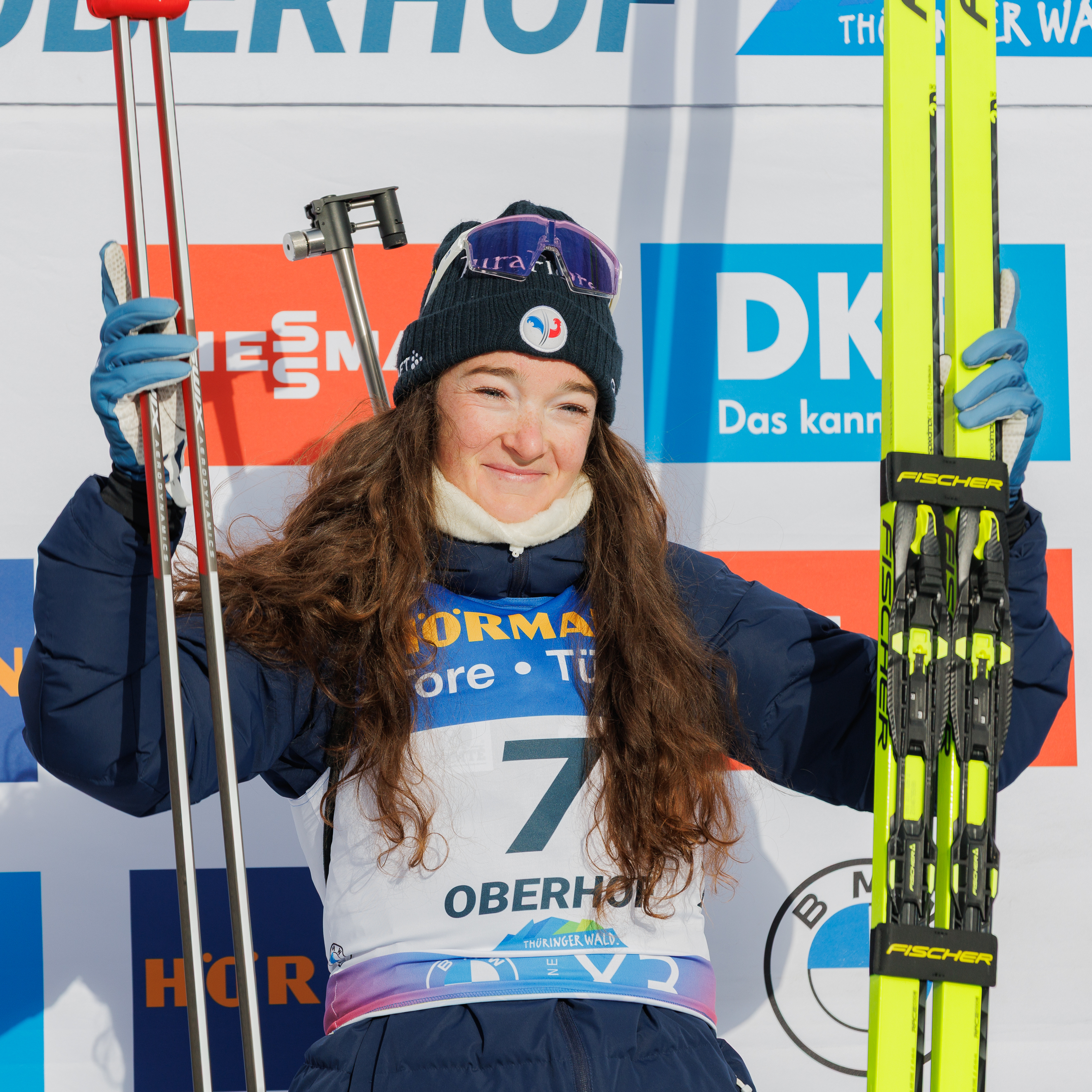
Lou Jeanmonnot

As the leaders of the overall standings, Éric Perrot and Lou Jeanmonnot started at the penultimate World Cup weekend.

Many national associations had nominated unchanged squads compared to the previous week. In the Norwegian team, Gro Randby received her first World Cup appearance of the winter in place of Siri Skar, while for Germany, Justus Strelow and Julia Kink took over the previously vacant sixth starting spot. Simon Eder was also able to start again in Otepää after his illness.

Rihards Lozbers became the youngest biathlete ever to score World Cup points, finishing 31st in the pursuit race at the age of 16.

== Schedule of events ==
The events took place at the following times.

Date	Time	Events
12 March	15:15 CET	Men's 10 km Sprint
13 March	15:15 CET	Women's 7.5 km Sprint
14 March	13:30 CET	Men's 12.5 km Pursuit
14 March	16:00 CET	Women's 10 km Pursuit
15 March	12:35 CET	Single Mixed Relay
15 March	14:40 CET	Mixed Relay (4 × 7.5 km)

== Medal winners ==
=== Men ===
Event:	Gold:	Time	Silver:	Time	Bronze:	Time
10 km Sprint	Sturla Holm Lægreid; Norway	23:28.5 (0+0)	Émilien Jacquelin; France	+10.7 (0+0)	Philipp Nawrath; Germany	+17.8 (0+0)
12.5 km Pursuit	Sturla Holm Lægreid; Norway	34:41.0 (0+0+0+1)	Émilien Jacquelin; France	+2:33.4 (0+0+2+3)	Martin Uldal; Norway	+2:46.7 (3+0+1+1)

=== Women ===
Event:	Gold:	Time	Silver:	Time	Bronze:	Time
7.5 km Sprint	Julia Simon; France	21:29.5 (0+0)	Lisa Vittozzi; Italy	+2.9 (0+0)	Lou Jeanmonnot; France	+22.9 (0+0)
10 km Pursuit	Lisa Vittozzi; Italy	33:33.7 (1+0+0+1)	Suvi Minkkinen; Finland	+26.2 (0+1+0+0)	Lou Jeanmonnot; France	+26.9 (0+0+0+1)

=== Mixed ===
Event:	Gold:	Time	Silver:	Time	Bronze:	Time
Single Mixed Relay	Norway; Sturla Holm Lægreid; Karoline Offigstad Knotten; Sturla Holm Lægreid; Karoline Offigstad Knotten	40:39.3 (0+0) (0+3) (0+2) (0+2) (0+0) (0+1) (0+0) (0+0)	Sweden; Sebastian Samuelsson; Hanna Öberg; Sebastian Samuelsson; Hanna Öberg	+1:38.1 (0+0) (0+1) (0+3) (0+2) (0+0) (1+3) (0+1) (2+3)	Finland; Tero Seppälä; Suvi Minkkinen; Tero Seppälä; Suvi Minkkinen	+1:45.7 (0+2) (1+3) (0+1) (0+3) (0+0) (0+3) (0+2) (0+1)
Mixed Relay	Sweden; Viktor Brandt; Martin Ponsiluoma; Anna-Karin Heijdenberg; Elvira Öberg	1:16:32.0 (0+3) (0+2) (1+3) (0+2) (0+1) (0+1) (0+1) (0+1)	Switzerland; Sebastian Stalder; Joscha Burkhalter; Aita Gasparin; Lena Häcki-Groß	+28.6 (0+0) (0+1) (0+0) (0+0) (0+0) (0+0) (0+2) (0+3)	United States; Maxime Germain; Campbell Wright; Deedra Irwin; Margie Freed	+34.6 (0+3) (0+1) (0+1) (0+2) (0+0) (0+1) (0+3) (0+3)

== Achievements ==
Best individual performance for all time

Men

- (Finland) Arttu Heikkinen (21) reached No. 14 on pursuit race
- (Czech Republic) Mikuláš Karlík (26) reached No. 16 on pursuit race
- (Italy) Christoph Pircher (22) reached No. 30 on sprint race
- (Latvia) Rihards Lozbers (16) reached No. 31 on pursuit race
- (Denmark) Emil Frisk (20) reached No. 98 on sprint race

Women

- (Latvia) Estere Volfa (20) reached No. 9 on sprint race
- (Estonia) Susan Külm (29) reached No. 10 on sprint race
- (Bulgaria) Raya Adzhamova (18) reached No. 66 on sprint race
- (Estonia) Kretel Kaljumae (20) reached No. 89 on sprint race
- (Kazakhstan) Laura Kinybayeva (25) reached No. 92 on sprint race

First World Cup individual race

Men

- (Denmark) Emil Frisk (20) reached No. 98 on sprint race

Women

- (Estonia) Kretel Kaljumae (20) reached No. 89 on sprint race
