= 2025–26 Biathlon World Cup – Stage 5 =

2025–26 Biathlon World Cup Stage

The 2025–26 Biathlon World Cup – Stage 5 is the fifth event of the season and was held in Ruhpolding, Germany, from 12 to 18 January 2026. The event consisted of two individual competitions and two relay races, one by men and one by women.

== Stage overview ==
The Norwegian team has made changes to its lineup: Sturla Holm Lægreid has returned after illness, replacing Sverre Dahlen Aspenes and Martin Nevland. Additionally, while the return of the past World Cup overall leader Johan-Olav Botn was initially planned for this stage, it was later announced that he will not participate and will instead focus on preparing for the 2026 Olympics. In the women's team, Juni Arnekleiv returns to the World Cup for the first time this season, and Siri Skar has been given the opportunity to make her debut. They have replaced Marit Øygard and Åsne Skrede. Additionally, Ingrid Landmark Tandrevold, who was initially registered for the stage, missed the relay and subsequently the sprint due to feeling unwell. The Italian team has seen the return of its leaders, Dorothea Wierer and Lisa Vittozzi, while Rebecca Passler is missing the stage due to illness. In the German team, Sophia Schneider replaced Anna Weidel, and Danilo Riethmüller was also brought back into the main squad. The Swedish team has entered seven women for the stage, two of whom were absent from the previous stage: Ella Halvarsson and Johanna Skottheim, while Sara Andersson has been dropped. In the French men's team, Émilien Claude was brought back into the main squad, replacing Valentin Lejeune. Although Czech leader Markéta Davidová was entered for this stage, she ultimately did not compete in either the relay or the sprint. Other notable returns include Lisa Theresa Hauser, who missed the previous stage due to illness, and Paulína Bátovská Fialková, who skipped the previous stage as part of her preparation for the 2026 Olympics.

For the first time in World Cup history, a biathlete representing Denmark will compete in the women's individual race: Anne Bunemann de Besche.

== Schedule of events ==
The events took place at the following times.

Date	Time	Events
14 January	14:30 CET	Women's 4X6 km Relay
15 January	14:30 CET	Men's 4X7.5 km Relay
16 January	14:30 CET	Women's 7.5 km Sprint
17 January	14:30 CET	Men's 10 km Sprint
18 January	12:30 CET	Women's 10 km Pursuit
18 January	15:00 CET	Men's 12.5 km Pursuit

== Medal winners ==
=== Men ===
Event:	Gold:	Time	Silver:	Time	Bronze:	Time
4 x 7.5 km Men Relay	France; Fabien Claude; Oscar Lombardot; Quentin Fillon Maillet; Éric Perrot	1:08:58.1 (0+0) (1+3) (0+0) (0+0) (0+0) (0+1) (0+0) (0+0)	Norway; Johannes Dale-Skjevdal; Sturla Holm Lægreid; Martin Uldal; Vetle Sjåstad Christiansen	1:09:04.3 (0+2) (0+1) (0+0) (0+1) (0+0) (0+2) (0+0) (0+1)	Germany; Justus Strelow; Danilo Riethmüller; David Zobel; Philipp Nawrath	1:09:06.0 (0+1) (0+0) (0+1) (0+0) (0+1) (0+0) (0+1) (0+1)
10 km Sprint	Sebastian Samuelsson; Sweden	21:53.8 (0+0)	Tommaso Giacomel; Italy	22:11.4 (1+0)	Isak Leknes Frey; Norway	22:27.9 (0+0)
12.5 km Pursuit	Johannes Dale-Skjevdal; Norway	30:23.9 (0+0+1+0)	Éric Perrot; France	+4.9 (2+0+0+1)	Martin Ponsiluoma; Sweden	+7.5 (2+0+1+1)

=== Women ===
Event:	Gold:	Time	Silver:	Time	Bronze:	Time
4 x 6 km Women Relay	Norway; Marthe Kråkstad Johansen; Juni Arnekleiv; Karoline Offigstad Knotten; Maren Kirkeeide	1:07:06.2 (0+0) (0+2) (0+0) (0+1) (0+2) (0+2) (0+1) (0+1)	Italy; Hannah Auchentaller; Dorothea Wierer; Michela Carrara; Lisa Vittozzi	1:07:07.1 (0+0) (0+1) (0+0) (0+1) (0+1) (0+1) (0+0) (0+0)	Sweden; Johanna Skottheim; Linn Gestblom; Elvira Öberg; Hanna Öberg	1:07:09.2 (0+0) (0+0) (0+1) (0+1) (0+0) (0+2) (0+2) (0+1)
7.5 km Sprint	Hanna Öberg; Sweden	19:10.7 (0+0)	Lou Jeanmonnot; France	19:18.2 (0+0)	Lisa Vittozzi; Italy	19:22.4 (0+0)
10 km Pursuit	Lou Jeanmonnot; France	29:26.6 (0+0+0+1)	Hanna Öberg; Sweden	+10.5 (1+2+0+0)	Camille Bened; France	+12.9 (0+0+0+0)

== Achievements ==
Best individual performance for all time

Men

- (Norway) Isak Frey (22) reached No. 3 on sprint race
- (Latvia) Renārs Birkentāls (24) reached No. 18 on sprint race
- (Poland) Konrad Badacz (23) reached No. 20 on sprint race
- (Sweden) Henning Sjökvist (28) reached No. 28 on pursuit race
- (Italy) Nicola Romanin (31) reached No. 30 on pursuit race
- (China) Chen Song (25) reached No. 91 on sprint race
- (Slovenia) Tadej Repnik (21) reached No. 107 on sprint race

Women

- (Switzerland) Lea Meier (24) reached No. 12 on pursuit race
- (Canada) Shilo Rousseau (25) reached No. 21 on pursuit race
- (Norway) Siri Skar (22) reached No. 27 on sprint race
- (Austria) Lara Wagner (23) reached No. 55 on pursuit race
- (Denmark) Anne De Besche (25) reached No. 78 on sprint race
- (Croatia) Iva Morić (21) reached No. 86 on sprint race
- (Estonia) Emma Roberta Rajando (21) reached No. 102 on sprint race

First World Cup individual race

Men

- (China) Chen Song (25) reached No. 91 on sprint race
- (Denmark) Rasmus Schiellerup (24) reached No. 100 on sprint race
- (Slovenia) Tadej Repnik (21) reached No. 107 on sprint race

Women

- (Norway) Siri Skar (22) reached No. 27 on sprint race
- (Denmark) Anne De Besche (25) reached No. 78 on sprint race
- (Croatia) Iva Morić (21) reached No. 86 on sprint race
- (Estonia) Emma Roberta Rajando (21) reached No. 102 on sprint race
