= Biathlon at the 2026 Winter Olympics – Men's relay =

Men's relay at the XXV Olympic Winter Games
- Biathlon
- Venue: Anterselva Biathlon Arena
- Date: 17 February 2026
- Competitors: 80 from 20 nations
- Teams: 20
- Winning time: 1:19:55.2

Medalists
1st place, gold medalist(s)		Fabien Claude; Émilien Jacquelin; Quentin Fillon Maillet; Éric Perrot	France
2nd place, silver medalist(s)		Martin Uldal; Johan-Olav Botn; Sturla Holm Lægreid; Vetle Sjåstad Christiansen	Norway
3rd place, bronze medalist(s)		Viktor Brandt; Jesper Nelin; Martin Ponsiluoma; Sebastian Samuelsson	Sweden

The men's relay competition of the 2026 Winter Olympics was held on 17 February, at the Anterselva Biathlon Arena in Rasen-Antholz. France, represented by Fabien Claude, Émilien Jacquelin, Quentin Fillon Maillet, and Éric Perrot, won the event. Norway were second and Sweden third.

== Background ==
Norway were the defending champions, and France were the 2022 silver medalist. The bronze medalist, Russian Olympic Committee, were barred from participation in 2026 due to the military aggression of Russia against Ukraine. Prior to the Olympics, there were four men's relay competitions in the 2025–26 Biathlon World Cup. Three were won by Norway and one by France. Norway were also the 2025 World champions.

== Results ==
The race was started at 14:30.

Rank	Bib	Country	Time	Penalties (P+S)	Deficit
1st place, gold medalist(s)	2	France; Fabien Claude; Émilien Jacquelin; Quentin Fillon Maillet; Éric Perrot	1:19:55.2; 20:41.8; 19:23.6; 19:38.7; 20:11.1	0+2 1+7; 0+1 1+3; 0+0 0+1; 0+1 0+1; 0+0 0+2	
2nd place, silver medalist(s)	1	Norway; Martin Uldal; Johan-Olav Botn; Sturla Holm Lægreid; Vetle Sjåstad Christiansen	1:20:05.0; 19:51.5; 20:30.0; 19:23.1; 20:20.4	0+6 0+0; 0+2 0+0; 0+3 0+0; 0+0 0+0; 0+1 0+0	+9.8
3rd place, bronze medalist(s)	3	Sweden; Viktor Brandt; Jesper Nelin; Martin Ponsiluoma; Sebastian Samuelsson	1:20:52.7; 20:09.4; 19:58.7; 19:36.9; 21:07.7	0+5 0+1; 0+1 0+1; 0+0 0+0; 0+2 0+0; 0+2 0+0	+57.5
4	4	Germany; Justus Strelow; David Zobel; Philipp Nawrath; Philipp Horn	1:21:43.5; 20:06.6; 20:30.6; 19:56.6; 21:09.7	0+4 0+8; 0+0 0+2; 0+0 0+3; 0+1 0+3; 0+3 0+0	+1:48.3
5	5	United States; Sean Doherty; Maxime Germain; Paul Schommer; Campbell Wright	1:22:22.6; 20:53.1; 20:17.4; 20:42.0; 20:30.1	0+5 0+3; 0+1 0+3; 0+0 0+0; 0+1 0+0; 0+3 0+0	+2:27.4
6	7	Czech Republic; Tomáš Mikyska; Vítězslav Hornig; Petr Hák; Michal Krčmář	1:22:26.5; 20:25.5; 20:27.2; 20:55.8; 20:38.0	0+1 0+9; 0+0 0+2; 0+0 0+2; 0+1 0+3; 0+0 0+2	+2:31.3
7	11	Finland; Olli Hiidensalo; Tero Seppälä; Jimi Klemettinen; Otto Invenius	1:22:29.3; 20:06.2; 19:59.7; 21:51.2; 20:32.2	0+4 2+6; 0+0 0+0; 0+1 0+1; 0+2 2+3; 0+1 0+2	+2:34.1
8	9	Switzerland; Sebastian Stalder; Joscha Burkhalter; Jeremy Finello; Niklas Hartweg	1:22:36.6; 20:07.7; 20:29.2; 21:12.0; 20:47.7	0+5 2+7; 0+0 0+1; 0+1 0+1; 0+2 2+3; 0+2 0+2	+2:41.4
9	12	Slovenia; Miha Dovžan; Jakov Fak; Lovro Planko; Anton Vidmar	1:22:53.0; 20:26.6; 20:20.4; 20:13.5; 21:52.5	0+2 1+9; 0+0 0+3; 0+0 0+3; 0+0 0+0; 0+2 1+3	+2:57.8
10	18	Austria; Dominic Unterweger; Simon Eder; Fabian Müllauer; Patrick Jakob	1:22:58.5; 20:41.9; 20:52.3; 20:03.7; 21:20.6	0+1 0+6; 0+1 0+2; 0+0 0+2; 0+0 0+1; 0+0 0+1	+3:03.3
11	13	Poland; Konrad Badacz; Grzegorz Galica; Jan Guńka; Marcin Zawół	1:23:32.5; 20:48.1; 20:23.1; 20:41.6; 21:39.7	0+5 0+5; 0+0 0+0; 0+1 0+1; 0+1 0+3; 0+3 0+1	+3:37.3
12	19	Bulgaria; Blagoy Todev; Vladimir Iliev; Konstantin Vasilev; Anton Sinapov	1:23:42.5; 20:58.9; 20:42.5; 20:27.3; 21:33.8	0+4 0+6; 0+2 0+2; 0+2 0+3; 0+0 0+0; 0+0 0+1	+3:47.3
13	8	Estonia; Rene Zahkna; Kristo Siimer; Mark-Markos Kehva; Jakob Kulbin	1:23:48.8; 20:25.9; 20:23.4; 20:43.4; 22:16.1	0+3 0+3; 0+0 0+1; 0+1 0+1; 0+1 0+0; 0+1 0+1	+3:53.6
14	6	Italy; Patrick Braunhofer; Lukas Hofer; Nicola Romanin; Tommaso Giacomel	1:24:23.7; 21:18.7; 20:36.9; 20:57.8; 21:30.3	0+5 0+4; 0+1 0+1; 0+2 0+0; 0+1 0+0; 0+1 0+3	+4:28.5
15	16	Lithuania; Vytautas Strolia; Karol Dombrovski; Nikita Čigak; Maksim Fomin	1:24:40.3; 20:28.6; 21:09.2; 21:30.0; 21:32.5	0+7 0+2; 0+3 0+0; 0+1 0+0; 0+3 0+0; 0+0 0+2	+4:45.1
16	10	Ukraine; Dmytro Pidruchnyi; Bohdan Borkovskyi; Vitalii Mandzyn; Taras Lesiuk	1:25:07.4; 20:11.0; 21:08.7; 20:12.7; 23:35.0	0+7 2+5; 0+2 0+1; 0+3 0+0; 0+0 0+1; 0+2 2+3	+5:12.2
17	14	Canada; Adam Runnalls; Logan Pletz; Jasper Fleming; Zachary Connelly	1:26:26.9; 20:35.5; 20:33.6; 22:37.0; 22:40.8	1+7 2+6; 0+2 0+0; 0+2 0+0; 1+3 1+3; 0+0 1+3	+6:31.7
18	20	Latvia; Andrejs Rastorgujevs; Renārs Birkentāls; Rihards Lozbers; Edgars Mise	1:26:39.1; 20:28.3; 20:19.9; 22:44.1; 23:06.8	0+5 5+8; 0+2 0+2; 0+1 0+0; 0+1 3+3; 0+1 2+3	+6:43.9
19	17	Belgium; Thierry Langer; Florent Claude; Sam Parmantier; Marek Mackels	1:26:55.8; 21:04.8; 21:00.5; 22:24.0; 22:26.5	0+11 0+7; 0+3 0+1; 0+2 0+2; 0+3 0+3; 0+3 0+1	+7:00.6
20	15	Romania; Dmitrii Shamaev; George Buta; George Colțea; Raul Flore	LAP; 21:19.1; 22:36.4; 21:39.1	1+6 0+6; 0+0 0+2; 0+1 0+3; 0+2 0+1; 1+3	
