= 2025–26 Biathlon World Cup – Stage 7 =

2025–26 Biathlon World Cup Stage

The 2025–26 Biathlon World Cup – Stage 7 was the seventh event of the season and was held in Kontiolahti, Finland, from 2 to 8 March 2026. The event consisted of four individual competitions and two relay races. After all the races of the stage, Éric Perrot leads the overall World Cup standings for men, and Lou Jeanmonnot leads for women. U-23 World Cup ranking leaders after the events in Kontiolahti were Isak Frey for men and Maren Kirkeeide for the women.

== Stage overview ==
Overall World Cup standings leaders after stage 7

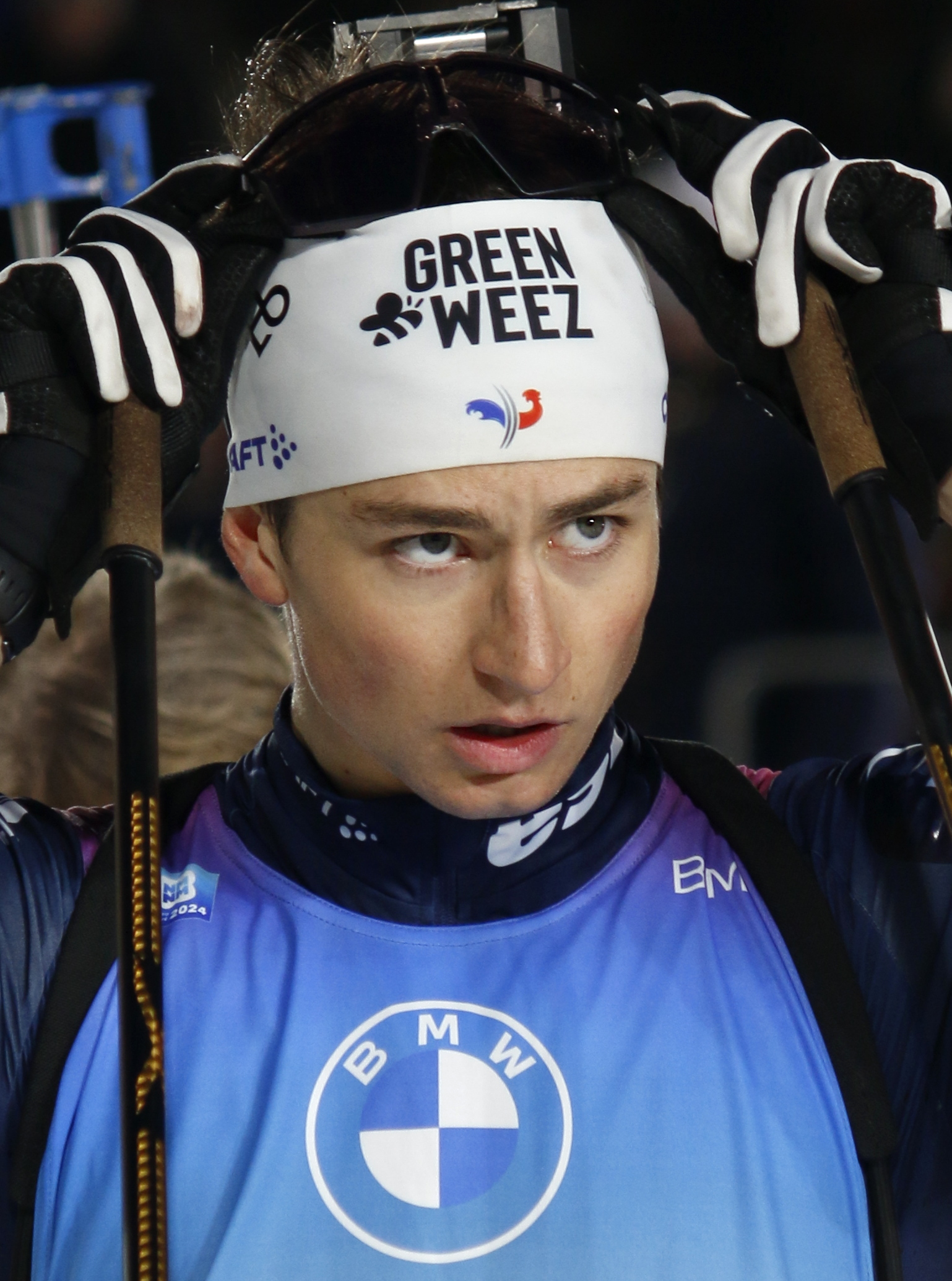
Éric Perrot

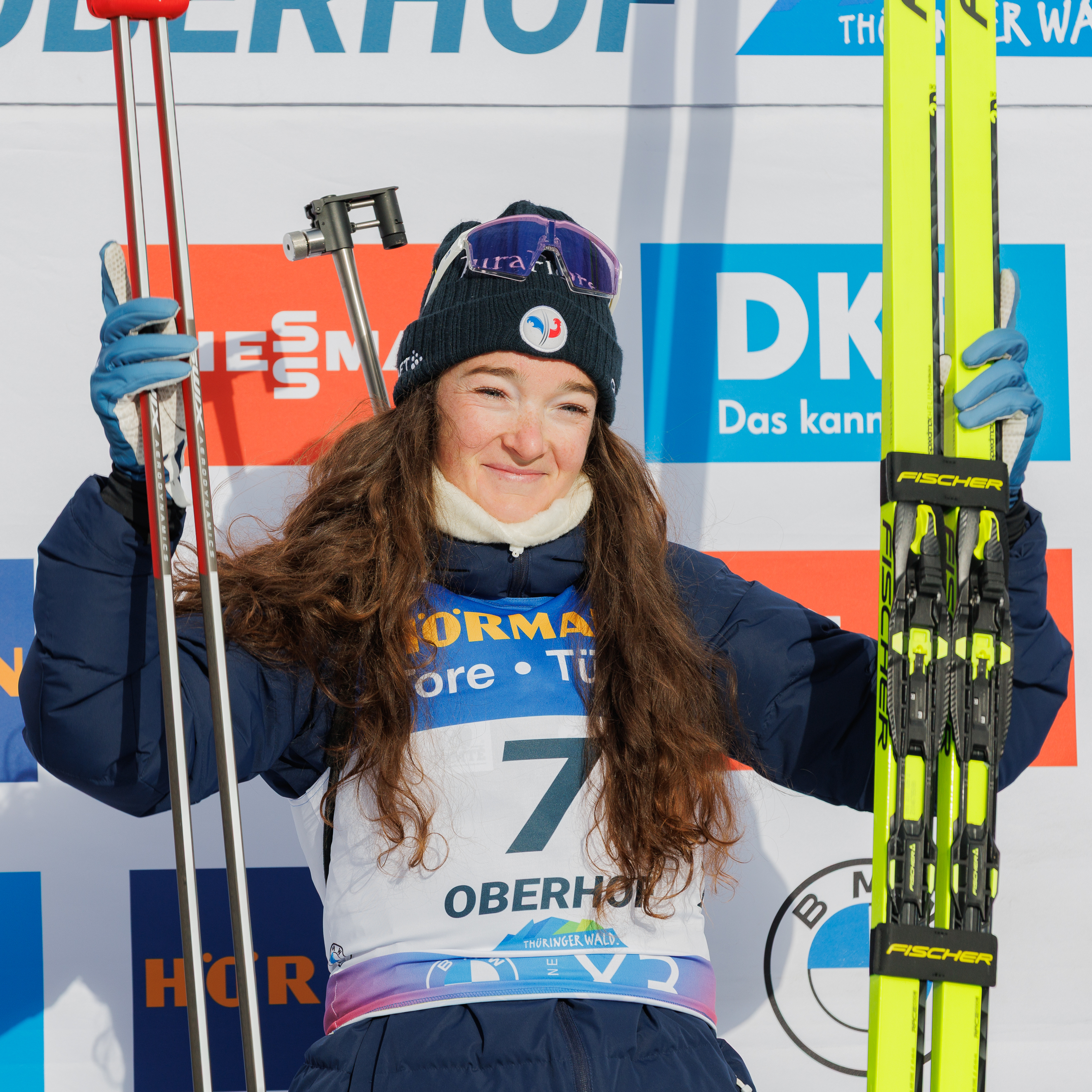
Lou Jeanmonnot

As the Olympic Games did not count towards the World Cup standings, Éric Perrot – who had taken the lead from Tommaso Giacomel – and Lou Jeanmonnot started the final World Cup weekend before the end of the season. Giacomel had to abandon the Olympic mass start due to health issues, subsequently underwent heart surgery and prematurely ended his season, thus forfeiting any chance of winning the overall World Cup. Also absent were Dorothea Wierer and Franziska Preuß, both of whom had ended their careers after the Olympic season's highlight, as well as Markéta Davidová, who continued to suffer from the effects of a herniated disc.

Compared to the Olympic Games, there were few changes among the strongest nations' squads. Norway had additionally nominated Siri Skar, while for France, Sophie Chauveau returned in place of Jeanne Richard. Justus Strelow had to take a break due to a broken finger, meaning a reduced team of ten athletes started for the German Ski Association. Leo Pfund and Marlene Fichtner remained in the squad compared to the Nové Město World Cup. Austria nominated Lukas Haslinger in addition to their Olympic starters, and Switzerland added Dajan Danuser. For the Italian team, Martina Trabucchi received her first World Cup start of the season, replacing the absent Tommaso Giacomel with Christoph Pircher. Rebecca Passler had successfully appealed her doping suspension that occurred shortly before the Olympic Games, making her eligible to compete.

== Schedule of events ==
The events took place at the following times.

Date	Time	Events
5 March	17:05 CET	Women's 15 km Individual
6 March	17:10 CET	Men's 20 km Individual
7 March	13:40 CET	Women's 12.5 km Mass Start
7 March	15:40 CET	Men's 4 × 7.5 km Relay
8 March	13:30 CET	Women's 4 × 6 km Relay
8 March	16:55 CET	Men's 15 km Mass Start

== Medal winners ==
=== Men ===
Event:	Gold:	Time	Silver:	Time	Bronze:	Time
20 km Individual	Éric Perrot; France	44:55.7 (0+0+0+0)	Sturla Holm Lægreid; Norway	+29.9 (0+0+0+0)	Vetle Sjåstad Christiansen; Norway	+47.9 (0+0+0+0)
15 km Mass Start	Sturla Holm Lægreid; Norway	34:39.7 (0+0+0+0)	Éric Perrot; France	+16.5 (0+0+0+1)	Vetle Sjåstad Christiansen; Norway	+24.1 (0+0+1+0)
4 × 7.5 km Relay	Norway; Johannes Dale-Skjevdal; Johan-Olav Botn; Sturla Holm Lægreid; Vetle Sjåstad Christiansen	1:13:30.7 (0+1) (0+0) (0+3) (0+1) (0+1) (0+1) (0+0) (0+0)	France; Oscar Lombardot; Fabien Claude; Émilien Jacquelin; Quentin Fillon Maillet	+19.1 (0+0) (0+1) (0+0) (0+0) (0+0) (0+0) (0+3) (0+2)	Sweden; Viktor Brandt; Jesper Nelin; Martin Ponsiluoma; Sebastian Samuelsson	+48.1 (1+3) (0+1) (0+0) (0+2) (0+3) (0+1) (0+0) (0+0)

=== Women ===
Event:	Gold:	Time	Silver:	Time	Bronze:	Time
15 km Individual	Elvira Öberg; Sweden	41:46.4 (0+0+0+0)	Hanna Öberg; Sweden	+41.3 (0+0+0+1)	Paulína Bátovská Fialková; Slovakia	+45.0 (0+0+1+0)
12.5 km Mass Start	Julia Simon; France	34:40.0 (1+0+0+0)	Elvira Öberg; Sweden	+5.6 (0+0+1+1)	Anna Magnusson; Sweden	+8.9 (0+1+0+0)
4 × 6 km Relay	Sweden; Linn Gestblom; Anna Magnusson; Hanna Öberg; Elvira Öberg	1:09:33.2 (0+0) (0+0) (0+1) (0+0) (0+0) (0+0) (0+1) (0+2)	France; Camille Bened; Lou Jeanmonnot; Océane Michelon; Julia Simon	+40.6 (0+0) (0+0) (0+0) (0+1) (0+2) (0+0) (0+0) (0+1)	Norway; Marthe Kråkstad Johansen; Ingrid Landmark Tandrevold; Karoline Offigstad Knotten; Maren Kirkeeide	+1:06.8 (0+1) (0+0) (0+1) (0+1) (0+3) (1+3) (0+1) (0+0)

== Achievements ==
Best individual performance for all time

Men

- (Romania) Dmitrii Shamaev (30) reached No. 14 on individual race
- (Bulgaria) Vasil Zashev (23) reached No. 48 on individual race
- (Austria) Lukas Haslinger (23) reached No. 54 on individual race
- (Japan) Masaharu Yamamoto (25) reached No. 75 on individual race

Women

- (Germany) Marlene Fichtner (22) reached No. 4 on mass start race
- (Italy) Martina Trabucchi (23) reached No. 11 on mass start race
- (Lithuania) Judita Traubaitė (25) reached No. 15 on individual race
- (Slovakia) Ema Kapustová (23) reached No. 16 on individual race
- (Ukraine) Daryna Chalyk (24) reached No. 42 on individual race
- (Belgium) Rieke De Maeyer (34) reached No. 71 on individual race
- (Greece) Konstantina Charalampidou (23) reached No. 78 on individual race
- (Kazakhstan) Laura Kinybayeva (25) reached No. 93 on individual race

First World Cup individual race

Men

Women

- (Kazakhstan) Laura Kinybayeva (25) reached No. 93 on individual race
