= 2025–26 Biathlon World Cup =

Biathlon competition

Discipline	Men	Women
Overall	(France) Éric Perrot (1)	(France) Lou Jeanmonnot (1)
U23	(Norway) Isak Leknes Frey (1)	(Norway) Maren Kirkeeide (1)
Individual	(France) Éric Perrot (1)	(France) Lou Jeanmonnot (2)
Sprint	(Norway) Sturla Holm Lægreid (1)	(France) Lou Jeanmonnot (1)
Pursuit	(France) Éric Perrot (1)	(France) Lou Jeanmonnot (2)
Mass start	(France) Éric Perrot (1)	(France) Julia Simon (2)
Relay	Norway (16)	France (5)
Nations Cup	Norway (21)	Sweden (1)
- Mixed: Norway (10)

Competition
Edition	49th	44th
Locations	10	10
Individual	21	21
Relay/Team	5	5
Mixed	6	6
Rescheduled	–	1

Overall Champions

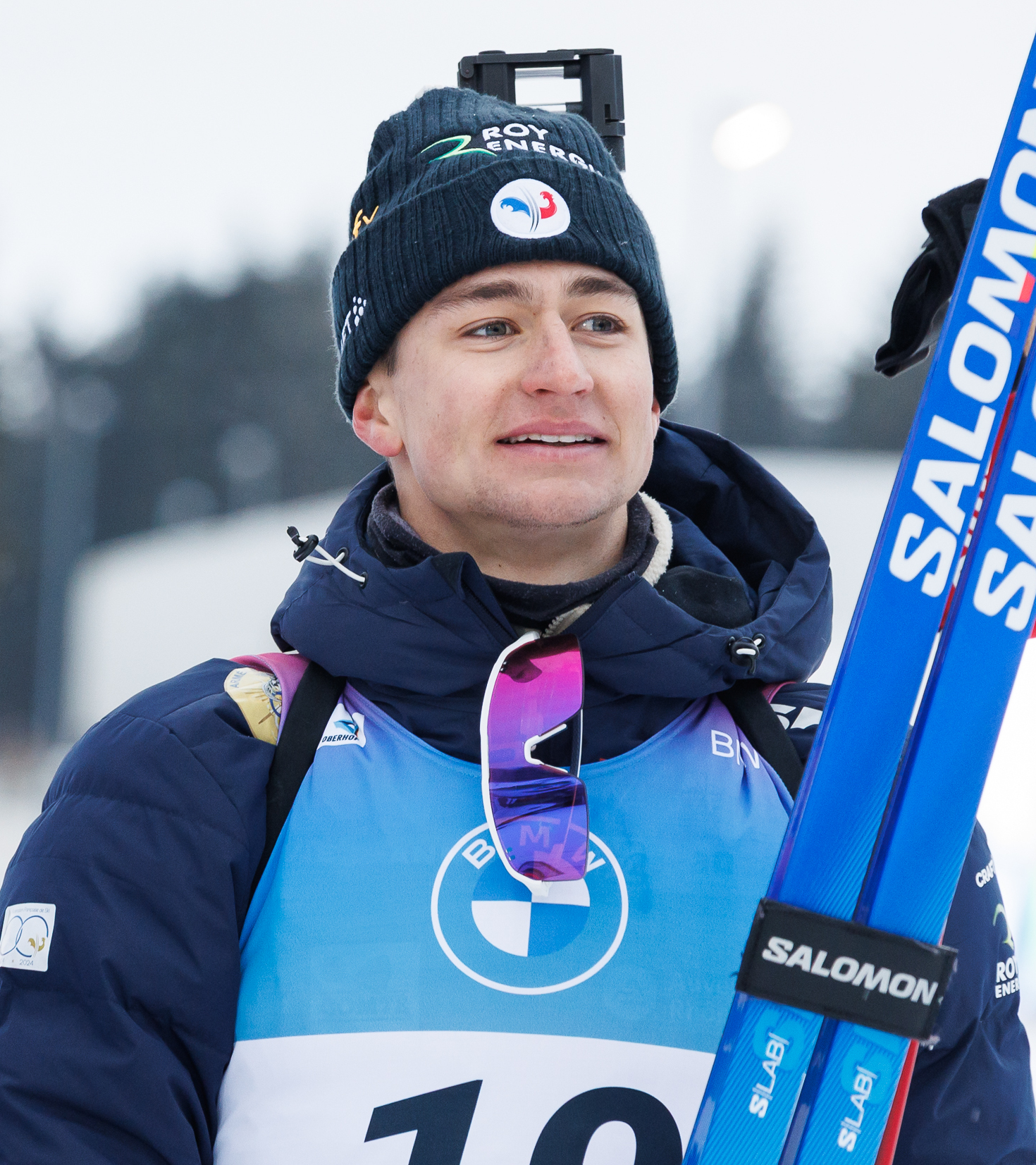
Éric Perrot claimed his first World Cup title, securing four victories this season. He also earned small crystal globes in the individual, pursuit, and mass start standings as well as three Olympic medals.

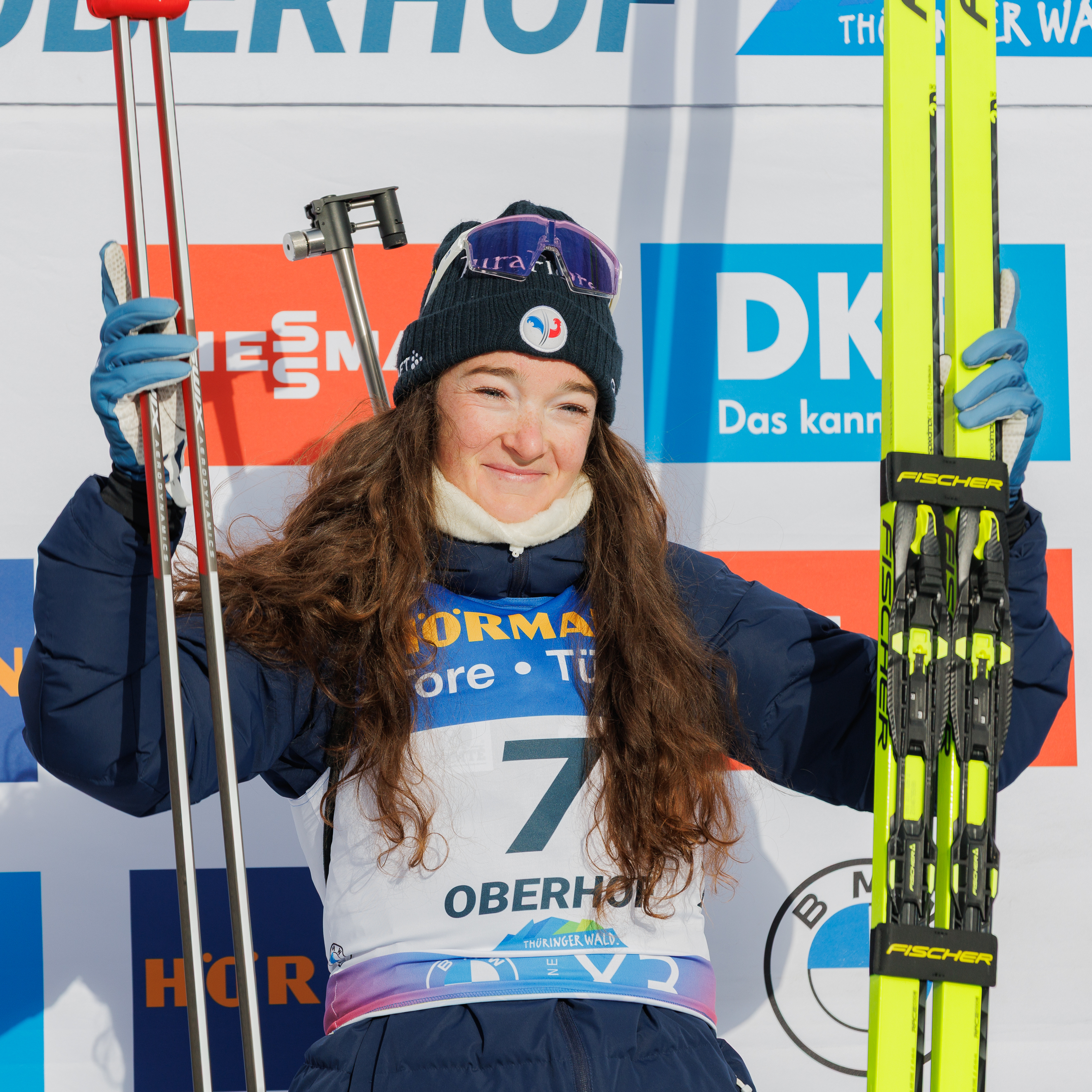
Lou Jeanmonnot also claimed the crystal globe for the first time in her career, securing three victories, three small crystal globes (individual, sprint and pursuit), and four Olympic medals.

The 2025–26 Biathlon World Cup (official: BMW IBU World Cup Biathlon), organised by the International Biathlon Union (IBU), was the 49th official World Cup season for men and 44th edition for women as the highest level of international biathlon competitions.

The season started on 29 November 2025 in Östersund, Sweden and concluded on 22 March 2026 in Oslo Holmenkollen, Norway.

A major highlight of the season was the 2026 Winter Olympics, held in Milan–Cortina, Italy, from 8 to 21 February, with the biathlon events taking place in Antholz-Anterselva. The results from these competitions will not be included in the World Cup standings.

Sturla Holm Lægreid from Norway and Franziska Preuß from Germany were the reigning champions from the previous season. Lægreid finished the season in 2nd place and Preuß ended her career at Winter Olympics in Antholz-Anterselva, placing 16th overall in the season standings.

The new World Cup winners for the season, both claiming the title for the first time and representing France, were Éric Perrot and Lou Jeanmonnot (having finished 2nd in the overall standings in each of the previous two seasons). This marked the first time in World Cup history that both the men’s and women’s overall titles were won by athletes from France in the same season.

== Season overview ==
The men's sprint in Annecy–Le Grand-Bornand was regarded as the closest men's sprint in biathlon history, as the top six athletes finished within less than nine seconds of each other.

On 23 December 2025, 27-year-old Norwegian biathlete Sivert Guttorm Bakken was found dead in his hotel room during a training camp in Italy. At the time of his death, he was ranked 13th in the overall standings. In his memory, he was included on the start list with bib number 1 for the sprint in Oberhof.

As a result of victory in the pursuit race in Oberhof, Tommaso Giacomel took the lead in the Overall World Cup standings, becoming the first Italian since January 1992 and only the third Italian man in the history of the World Cup to wear yellow bib.

During the sprint on 16 January in Ruhpolding, Anne de Besche became the first Danish woman to start in a World Cup event. She finished the race in 78th place.

== Map of world cup hosts ==
(Sweden) Östersund	Location of all 10 World Cup hosts of the season (including Antholz-Anterselva – venue of the 2026 Winter Olympics)	(Czech Republic) Nové Město na Moravě
(Austria) Hochfilzen	Location of all 10 World Cup hosts of the season (including Antholz-Anterselva – venue of the 2026 Winter Olympics)	(Italy) Antholz-Anterselva
(France) Annecy–Le Grand-Bornand	Location of all 10 World Cup hosts of the season (including Antholz-Anterselva – venue of the 2026 Winter Olympics)	(Finland) Kontiolahti
(Germany) Oberhof	Location of all 10 World Cup hosts of the season (including Antholz-Anterselva – venue of the 2026 Winter Olympics)	(Estonia) Otepää
(Germany) Ruhpolding	Location of all 10 World Cup hosts of the season (including Antholz-Anterselva – venue of the 2026 Winter Olympics)	(Norway) Oslo Holmenkollen

== Calendar ==
Stage	Location	Date	Individual / Short individual	Sprint	Pursuit	Mass start	Relay	Mixed relay	Single mixed relay	Details
1	(Sweden) Östersund	29 November–7 December	●	●	●		●	●	●	details
2	(Austria) Hochfilzen	12–14 December		●	●		●			details
3	(France) Annecy–Le Grand-Bornand	18–21 December		●	●	●				details
4	(Germany) Oberhof	8–11 January		●	●		●			details
5	(Germany) Ruhpolding	14–18 January		●	●		●			details
6	(Czech Republic) Nové Město na Moravě	22–25 January	●			●		●	●	details
OG	(Italy) Antholz-Anterselva	8–21 February	●	●	●	●	●	●		Olympic Games (Note: Olympic Games are included in the World Cup calendar, but their results do not contribute to the overall World Cup standings.)
7	(Finland) Kontiolahti	5–8 March	●			●	●			details
8	(Estonia) Otepää	12–15 March		●	●			●	●	details
9	(Norway) Oslo Holmenkollen	19–22 March		●	●	●				details
Total: 69 (31 men's, 31 women's, 7 mixed)			4	8	8	5	6	4	3	

== Men ==
=== Calendar ===
Key: IND – Individual / SIND – Short Individual / SPR – Sprint / PUR – Pursuit / MSS – Mass Start
No.	Date	Place (In brackets Stage)	Discipline	Winner	Second	Third	R.
1	3 December 2025	(Sweden) Östersund (1)	20 km IND	(Norway) Johan-Olav Botn	(Norway) Martin Uldal	(Sweden) Sebastian Samuelsson	
2	6 December 2025	(Sweden) Östersund (1)	10 km SPR	(Norway) Johan-Olav Botn	(Norway) Martin Uldal	(France) Quentin Fillon Maillet	
3	7 December 2025	(Sweden) Östersund (1)	12.5 km PUR	(France) Quentin Fillon Maillet	(Sweden) Sebastian Samuelsson	(Norway) Johan-Olav Botn	
4	12 December 2025	(Austria) Hochfilzen (2)	10 km SPR	(Italy) Tommaso Giacomel	(France) Éric Perrot	(Germany) Philipp Horn	
5	13 December 2025	(Austria) Hochfilzen (2)	12.5 km PUR	(France) Éric Perrot	(Italy) Tommaso Giacomel	(Norway) Johan-Olav Botn	
6	19 December 2025	(France) Annecy–Le Grand-Bornand (3)	10 km SPR	(Norway) Vetle Sjåstad Christiansen	(Norway) Johannes Dale-Skjevdal	(France) Émilien Jacquelin	
7	20 December 2025	(France) Annecy–Le Grand-Bornand (3)	12.5 km PUR	(Norway) Johan-Olav Botn	(France) Émilien Jacquelin	(Norway) Johannes Dale-Skjevdal	
8	21 December 2025	(France) Annecy–Le Grand-Bornand (3)	15 km MSS	(Italy) Tommaso Giacomel	(France) Éric Perrot	(Norway) Vetle Sjåstad Christiansen	
9	8 January 2026	(Germany) Oberhof (4)	10 km SPR	(Italy) Tommaso Giacomel	(Germany) Philipp Nawrath	(Norway) Johannes Dale-Skjevdal	
10	10 January 2026	(Germany) Oberhof (4)	12.5 km PUR	(Italy) Tommaso Giacomel	(Norway) Martin Uldal	(Sweden) Sebastian Samuelsson	
11	17 January 2026	(Germany) Ruhpolding (5)	10 km SPR	(Sweden) Sebastian Samuelsson	(Italy) Tommaso Giacomel	(Norway) Isak Leknes Frey	
12	18 January 2026	(Germany) Ruhpolding (5)	12.5 km PUR	(Norway) Johannes Dale-Skjevdal	(France) Éric Perrot	(Sweden) Martin Ponsiluoma	
13	22 January 2026	(Czech Republic) Nové Město na Moravě (6)	15 km SIND	(France) Éric Perrot	(France) Émilien Jacquelin	(Italy) Lukas Hofer	
14	25 January 2026	(Czech Republic) Nové Město na Moravě (6)	15 km MSS	(France) Éric Perrot	(United States) Campbell Wright	(Norway) Sverre Dahlen Aspenes	
2026 Winter Olympics (8–20 February • Milano–Cortina, Italy)
—	10 February 2026	(Italy) Antholz-Anterselva (OG)	20 km IND	(gold) (Norway) Johan-Olav Botn	(silver) (France) Éric Perrot	(bronze) (Norway) Sturla Holm Lægreid	
—	13 February 2026	(Italy) Antholz-Anterselva (OG)	10 km SPR	(gold) (France) Quentin Fillon Maillet	(silver) (Norway) Vetle Sjåstad Christiansen	(bronze) (Norway) Sturla Holm Lægreid	
—	15 February 2026	(Italy) Antholz-Anterselva (OG)	12.5 km PUR	(gold) (Sweden) Martin Ponsiluoma	(silver) (Norway) Sturla Holm Lægreid	(bronze) (France) Émilien Jacquelin	
—	20 February 2026	(Italy) Antholz-Anterselva (OG)	15 km MSS	(gold) (Norway) Johannes Dale-Skjevdal	(silver) (Norway) Sturla Holm Lægreid	(bronze) (France) Quentin Fillon Maillet	
15	6 March 2026	(Finland) Kontiolahti (7)	20 km IND	(France) Éric Perrot	(Norway) Sturla Holm Lægreid	(Norway) Vetle Sjåstad Christiansen	
16	8 March 2026	(Finland) Kontiolahti (7)	15 km MSS	(Norway) Sturla Holm Lægreid	(France) Éric Perrot	(Norway) Vetle Sjåstad Christiansen	
17	12 March 2026	(Estonia) Otepää (8)	10 km SPR	(Norway) Sturla Holm Lægreid	(France) Émilien Jacquelin	(Germany) Philipp Nawrath	
18	14 March 2026	(Estonia) Otepää (8)	12.5 km PUR	(Norway) Sturla Holm Lægreid	(France) Émilien Jacquelin	(Norway) Martin Uldal	
19	20 March 2026	(Norway) Oslo Holmenkollen (9)	10 km SPR	(Norway) Sturla Holm Lægreid	(France) Émilien Jacquelin	(France) Éric Perrot	
20	21 March 2026	(Norway) Oslo Holmenkollen (9)	12.5 km PUR	(Norway) Sturla Holm Lægreid	(France) Éric Perrot	(France) Émilien Jacquelin	
21	22 March 2026	(Norway) Oslo Holmenkollen (9)	15 km MSS	(Norway) Johan-Olav Botn	(Germany) Philipp Nawrath	(France) Éric Perrot	
48th Biathlon World Cup Overall (3 December 2025 – 22 March 2026)				(France) Éric Perrot	(Norway) Sturla Holm Lægreid	(Norway) Johan-Olav Botn	

=== Relay – 4 x 7.5 km ===
No.	Date	Place (In brackets Stage)	Winner	Second	Third	Leader (After competition)	R.
1	29 November 2025	(Sweden) Östersund (1)	Norway: 1. Martin Uldal; 2. Isak Leknes Frey; 3. Sturla Holm Lægreid; 4. Vetle Sjåstad Christiansen	France: 1. Fabien Claude; 2. Quentin Fillon Maillet; 3. Émilien Jacquelin; 4. Éric Perrot	Sweden: 1. Viktor Brandt; 2. Jesper Nelin; 3. Martin Ponsiluoma; 4. Sebastian Samuelsson	Norway	
2	14 December 2025	(Austria) Hochfilzen (2)	Norway: 1. Johannes Dale-Skjevdal; 2. Johan-Olav Botn; 3. Sturla Holm Lægreid; 4. Vetle Sjåstad Christiansen	France: 1. Fabien Claude; 2. Émilien Jacquelin; 3. Quentin Fillon Maillet; 4. Éric Perrot	Sweden: 1. Jesper Nelin; 2. Malte Stefansson; 3. Martin Ponsiluoma; 4. Sebastian Samuelsson	Norway	
3	11 January 2026	(Germany) Oberhof (4)	Norway: 1. Isak Frey; 2. Johannes Dale-Skjevdal; 3. Martin Uldal; 4. Vetle Sjåstad Christiansen	France: 1. Fabien Claude; 2. Émilien Jacquelin; 3. Quentin Fillon Maillet; 4. Éric Perrot	Sweden: 1. Jesper Nelin; 2. Malte Stefansson; 3. Martin Ponsiluoma; 4. Sebastian Samuelsson	Norway	
4	15 January 2026	(Germany) Ruhpolding (5)	France: 1. Fabien Claude; 2. Oscar Lombardot; 3. Quentin Fillon Maillet; 4. Éric Perrot	Norway: 1. Johannes Dale-Skjevdal; 2. Sturla Holm Lægreid; 3. Martin Uldal; 4. Vetle Sjåstad Christiansen	Germany: 1. Justus Strelow; 2. Danilo Riethmüller; 3. David Zobel; 4. Philipp Nawrath	Norway	
—	17 February 2026	(Italy) Antholz-Anterselva (OG)	(gold) France: 1. Fabien Claude; 2. Émilien Jacquelin; 3. Quentin Fillon Maillet; 4. Éric Perrot	(silver) Norway: 1. Martin Uldal; 2. Johan-Olav Botn; 3. Sturla Holm Lægreid; 4. Vetle Sjåstad Christiansen	(bronze) Sweden: 1. Viktor Brandt; 2. Jesper Nelin; 3. Martin Ponsiluoma; 4. Sebastian Samuelsson	not included in the World Cup	
5	7 March 2026	(Finland) Kontiolahti (7)	Norway: 1. Johannes Dale-Skjevdal; 2. Johan-Olav Botn; 3. Sturla Holm Lægreid; 4. Vetle Sjåstad Christiansen	France: 1. Oscar Lombardot; 2. Fabien Claude; 3. Émilien Jacquelin; 4. Quentin Fillon Maillet	Sweden: 1. Viktor Brandt; 2. Jesper Nelin; 3. Martin Ponsiluoma; 4. Sebastian Samuelsson	Norway	

=== Overall leaders ===
Holder	Date	Place(s)	Number of competitions
Individual
(Norway) Johan-Olav Botn	3 December 2025 – 8 January 2026	(Sweden) Östersund – (Germany) Oberhof	9
(Italy) Tommaso Giacomel	10 January 2026 – 22 January 2026	(Germany) Oberhof – (Czech Republic) Nové Město na Moravě	4
(France) Éric Perrot	25 January 2026 – 22 March 2026	(Czech Republic) Nové Město na Moravě – (Norway) Oslo Holmenkollen	8
Under 23
(Estonia) Jakob Kulbin	3 December 2025	(Sweden) Östersund	1
(Norway) Isak Leknes Frey	6 December 2025 – 22 March 2026	(Sweden) Östersund – (Norway) Oslo Holmenkollen	20

=== Standings ===
==== Overall ====
Rank	final standings after 21 events	Points
1	(France) Éric Perrot	1263
2	(Norway) Sturla Holm Lægreid	984
3	(Norway) Johan-Olav Botn	968
4	(Sweden) Sebastian Samuelsson	918
5	(France) Émilien Jacquelin	876
6	(Italy) Tommaso Giacomel	797
7	(Norway) Vetle Sjåstad Christiansen	736
8	(Sweden) Martin Ponsiluoma	727
9	(Germany) Philipp Nawrath	716
10	(Norway) Johannes Dale-Skjevdal	697

==== Under 23 ====
Rank	final standings after 21 events	Points
1	(Norway) Isak Leknes Frey	538
2	(Ukraine) Vitalii Mandzyn	250
3	(Poland) Konrad Badacz	102
4	(Germany) Leonhard Pfund	88
5	(Finland) Arttu Heikkinen	84
6	(Latvia) Rihards Lozbers	59
7	(France) Gaëtan Paturel	50
8	(Poland) Grzegorz Galica	35
9	(Estonia) Jakob Kulbin	29
10	(Slovakia) Jakub Borguľa	22

==== Individual ====
Rank	final standings after 3 events	Points
1	(France) Éric Perrot	211
2	(Norway) Johan-Olav Botn	141
3	(France) Émilien Jacquelin	133
4	(Norway) Sturla Holm Lægreid	125
5	(Italy) Lukas Hofer	123

==== Sprint ====
Rank	final standings after 7 events	Points
	(Norway) Sturla Holm Lægreid	356
2	(Sweden) Sebastian Samuelsson	356
3	(France) Éric Perrot	335
4	(Italy) Tommaso Giacomel	309
5	(Germany) Philipp Nawrath	293

==== Pursuit ====
Rank	final standings after 7 events	Points
1	(France) Éric Perrot	412
2	(Sweden) Sebastian Samuelsson	343
3	(Norway) Sturla Holm Lægreid	329
4	(Norway) Johannes Dale-Skjevdal	319
5	(France) Émilien Jacquelin	313

==== Mass start ====
Rank	final standings after 4 events	Points
1	(France) Éric Perrot	305
2	(Norway) Johan-Olav Botn	236
3	(Norway) Sturla Holm Lægreid	174
4	(United States) Campbell Wright	173
5	(Norway) Vetle Sjåstad Christiansen	161

==== Relay ====
Rank	final standings after 5 events	Points
1	Norway	435
2	France	390
3	Sweden	315
4	Germany	265
5	United States	233

==== Nations Cup ====
Rank	final standings after 21 events	Points
1	Norway	7466
2	France	7027
3	Sweden	6696
4	Germany	6180
5	Italy	5724

== Women ==
=== Calendar ===
Key: IND – Individual / SIND – Short Individual / SPR – Sprint / PUR – Pursuit / MSS – Mass Start
No.	Date	Place (In brackets Stage)	Discipline	Winner	Second	Third	R.
1	2 December 2025	(Sweden) Östersund (1)	15 km IND	(Italy) Dorothea Wierer	(Finland) Sonja Leinamo	(France) Camille Bened	
2	5 December 2025	(Sweden) Östersund (1)	7.5 km SPR	(Finland) Suvi Minkkinen	(Sweden) Anna Magnusson	(France) Océane Michelon	
3	7 December 2025	(Sweden) Östersund (1)	10 km PUR	(Austria) Lisa Theresa Hauser	(Finland) Suvi Minkkinen	(Sweden) Anna Magnusson	
4	12 December 2025	(Austria) Hochfilzen (2)	7.5 km SPR	(France) Lou Jeanmonnot	(Norway) Maren Kirkeeide	(Sweden) Anna Magnusson	
5	14 December 2025	(Austria) Hochfilzen (2)	10 km PUR	(Italy) Lisa Vittozzi	(Sweden) Anna Magnusson	(Norway) Maren Kirkeeide	
6	18 December 2025	(France) Annecy–Le Grand-Bornand (3)	7.5 km SPR	(Sweden) Hanna Öberg	(France) Lou Jeanmonnot	(Italy) Dorothea Wierer	
7	20 December 2025	(France) Annecy–Le Grand-Bornand (3)	10 km PUR	(France) Lou Jeanmonnot	(Finland) Suvi Minkkinen	(Italy) Dorothea Wierer	
8	21 December 2025	(France) Annecy–Le Grand-Bornand (3)	12.5 km MSS	(Norway) Maren Kirkeeide	(France) Lou Jeanmonnot	(France) Justine Braisaz-Bouchet	
9	(Note: Women's Sprint originally scheduled for 9 January (Friday), was rescheduled to 8 January (Thursday), due to bad weather conditions.)8 January 2026	(Germany) Oberhof (4)	7.5 km SPR	(Sweden) Elvira Öberg	(Finland) Suvi Minkkinen	(France) Julia Simon	
10	11 January 2026	(Germany) Oberhof (4)	10 km PUR	(Sweden) Elvira Öberg	(Finland) Suvi Minkkinen	(Sweden) Hanna Öberg	
11	16 January 2026	(Germany) Ruhpolding (5)	7.5 km SPR	(Sweden) Hanna Öberg	(France) Lou Jeanmonnot	(Italy) Lisa Vittozzi	
12	18 January 2026	(Germany) Ruhpolding (5)	10 km PUR	(France) Lou Jeanmonnot	(Sweden) Hanna Öberg	(France) Camille Bened	
13	23 January 2026	(Czech Republic) Nové Město na Moravě (6)	12.5 km SIND	(France) Justine Braisaz-Bouchet	(France) Lou Jeanmonnot	(Germany) Franziska Preuß	
14	25 January 2026	(Czech Republic) Nové Město na Moravě (6)	12.5 km MSS	(France) Julia Simon	(France) Océane Michelon	(Italy) Lisa Vittozzi	
2026 Winter Olympics (8–21 February • Milano–Cortina, Italy)
—	11 February 2026	(Italy) Antholz-Anterselva (OG)	15 km IND	(gold) (France) Julia Simon	(silver) (France) Lou Jeanmonnot	(bronze) (Bulgaria) Lora Hristova	
—	14 February 2026	(Italy) Antholz-Anterselva (OG)	7.5 km SPR	(gold) (Norway) Maren Kirkeeide	(silver) (France) Océane Michelon	(bronze) (France) Lou Jeanmonnot	
—	15 February 2026	(Italy) Antholz-Anterselva (OG)	10 km PUR	(gold) (Italy) Lisa Vittozzi	(silver) (Norway) Maren Kirkeeide	(bronze) (Finland) Suvi Minkkinen	
—	21 February 2026	(Italy) Antholz-Anterselva (OG)	12.5 km MSS	(gold) (France) Océane Michelon	(silver) (France) Julia Simon	(bronze) (Czech Republic) Tereza Voborníková	
15	5 March 2026	(Finland) Kontiolahti (7)	15 km IND	(Sweden) Elvira Öberg	(Sweden) Hanna Öberg	(Slovakia) Paulína Bátovská Fialková	
16	7 March 2026	(Finland) Kontiolahti (7)	12.5 km MSS	(France) Julia Simon	(Sweden) Elvira Öberg	(Sweden) Anna Magnusson	
17	13 March 2026	(Estonia) Otepää (8)	7.5 km SPR	(France) Julia Simon	(Italy) Lisa Vittozzi	(France) Lou Jeanmonnot	
18	14 March 2026	(Estonia) Otepää (8)	10 km PUR	(Italy) Lisa Vittozzi	(Finland) Suvi Minkkinen	(France) Lou Jeanmonnot	
19	19 March 2026	(Norway) Oslo Holmenkollen (9)	7.5 km SPR	(Sweden) Hanna Öberg	(Italy) Lisa Vittozzi	(Sweden) Elvira Öberg	
20	21 March 2026	(Norway) Oslo Holmenkollen (9)	10 km PUR	(Sweden) Hanna Öberg	(France) Julia Simon	(Sweden) Elvira Öberg	
21	22 March 2026	(Norway) Oslo Holmenkollen (9)	12.5 km MSS	(Italy) Lisa Vittozzi	(Sweden) Hanna Öberg	(Czech Republic) Tereza Voborníková	
48th Biathlon World Cup Overall (2 December 2025 – 22 March 2026)				(France) Lou Jeanmonnot	(Sweden) Hanna Öberg	(Italy) Lisa Vittozzi	

=== Relay – 4 x 6 km ===
No.	Date	Place (In brackets Stage)	Winner	Second	Third	Leader (After competition)	R.
1	29 November 2025	(Sweden) Östersund (1)	France: 1. Jeanne Richard; 2. Océane Michelon; 3. Justine Braisaz-Bouchet; 4. Lou Jeanmonnot	Italy: 1. Dorothea Wierer; 2. Michela Carrara; 3. Lisa Vittozzi; 4. Hannah Auchentaller	Czech Republic: 1. Jessica Jislová; 2. Lucie Charvátová; 3. Tereza Voborníková; 4. Markéta Davidová	France	
2	13 December 2025	(Austria) Hochfilzen (2)	Sweden: 1. Ella Halvarsson; 2. Anna Magnusson; 3. Elvira Öberg; 4. Hanna Öberg	Norway: 1. Marthe Kråkstad Johansen; 2. Ingrid Landmark Tandrevold; 3. Karoline Offigstad Knotten; 4. Maren Kirkeeide	Germany: 1. Anna Weidel; 2. Julia Tannheimer; 3. Janina Hettich-Walz; 4. Vanessa Voigt	Sweden	
3	10 January 2026	(Germany) Oberhof (4)	France: 1. Lou Jeanmonnot; 2. Océane Michelon; 3. Justine Braisaz-Bouchet; 4. Julia Simon	Norway: 1. Marthe Kråkstad Johansen; 2. Ingrid Landmark Tandrevold; 3. Karoline Offigstad Knotten; 4. Maren Kirkeeide	Germany: 1. Selina Grotian; 2. Julia Tannheimer; 3. Janina Hettich-Walz; 4. Franziska Preuß	France	
4	14 January 2026	(Germany) Ruhpolding (5)	Norway: 1. Marthe Kråkstad Johansen; 2. Juni Arnekleiv; 3. Karoline Offigstad Knotten; 4. Maren Kirkeeide	Italy: 1. Hannah Auchentaller; 2. Dorothea Wierer; 3. Michela Carrara; 4. Lisa Vittozzi	Sweden: 1. Johanna Skottheim; 2. Linn Gestblom; 3. Elvira Öberg; 4. Hanna Öberg	France	
—	18 February 2026	(Italy) Antholz-Anterselva (OG)	(gold) France: 1. Camille Bened; 2. Lou Jeanmonnot; 3. Océane Michelon; 4. Julia Simon	(silver) Sweden: 1. Linn Gestblom; 2. Anna Magnusson; 3. Elvira Öberg; 4. Hanna Öberg	(bronze) Norway: 1. Marthe Krakstad Johansen; 2. Juni Arnekleiv; 3. Karoline Offigstad Knotten; 4. Maren Kirkeeide	not included in the World Cup	
5	8 March 2026	(Finland) Kontiolahti (7)	Sweden: 1. Linn Gestblom; 2. Anna Magnusson; 3. Hanna Öberg; 4. Elvira Öberg	France: 1. Camille Bened; 2. Lou Jeanmonnot; 3. Océane Michelon; 4. Julia Simon	Norway: 1. Marthe Kråkstad Johansen; 2. Ingrid Landmark Tandrevold; 3. Karoline Offigstad Knotten; 4. Maren Kirkeeide	France	

=== Overall leaders ===
Holder	Date	Place(s)	Number of competitions
Individual
(Italy) Dorothea Wierer	2 December 2025	(Sweden) Östersund	1
(Finland) Suvi Minkkinen	5 December 2025 – 7 December 2025	(Sweden) Östersund	2
(Sweden) Anna Magnusson	12 December 2025 – 18 December 2025	(Austria) Hochfilzen – (France) Annecy	3
(France) Lou Jeanmonnot	20 December 2025 – 22 March 2026	(France) Annecy – (Norway) Oslo Holmenkollen	15
Under 23
(Norway) Maren Kirkeeide	2 December 2025 – 22 March 2026	(Sweden) Östersund – (Norway) Oslo Holmenkollen	21

=== Standings ===
==== Overall ====
Rank	final standings after 21 events	Points
1	(France) Lou Jeanmonnot	1135
2	(Sweden) Hanna Öberg	958
3	(Italy) Lisa Vittozzi	935
4	(Sweden) Elvira Öberg	922
5	(Finland) Suvi Minkkinen	881
6	(France) Julia Simon	827
7	(Sweden) Anna Magnusson	803
8	(France) Océane Michelon	651
9	(Norway) Maren Kirkeeide	639
10	(France) Camille Bened	600

==== Under 23 ====
Rank	final standings after 21 events	Points
1	(Norway) Maren Kirkeeide	639
2	(Germany) Julia Tannheimer	306
3	(Germany) Selina Grotian	204
4	(Germany) Marlene Fichtner	203
5	(Slovenia) Lena Repinc	145
6	(Finland) Inka Hämäläinen	101
7	(Bulgaria) Lora Hristova	93
8	(Latvia) Estere Volfa	93
9	(Norway) Siri Skar	78
10	(Austria) Anna Andexer	62

==== Individual ====
Rank	final standings after 3 events	Points
1	(France) Lou Jeanmonnot	136
2	(Sweden) Anna Magnusson	134
3	(Sweden) Elvira Öberg	127
4	(Sweden) Hanna Öberg	125
5	(Italy) Dorothea Wierer	106

==== Sprint ====
Rank	final standings after 7 events	Points
1	(France) Lou Jeanmonnot	421
2	(Sweden) Hanna Öberg	345
3	(Italy) Lisa Vittozzi	323
4	(Sweden) Elvira Öberg	320
5	(Finland) Suvi Minkkinen	315

==== Pursuit ====
Rank	final standings after 7 events	Points
	(France) Lou Jeanmonnot	397
2	(Finland) Suvi Minkkinen	380
3	(Sweden) Hanna Öberg	372
4	(Italy) Lisa Vittozzi	331
5	(Sweden) Elvira Öberg	323

==== Mass start ====
Rank	final standings after 4 events	Points
1	(France) Julia Simon	245
2	(Italy) Lisa Vittozzi	186
3	(France) Océane Michelon	183
4	(France) Lou Jeanmonnot	181
5	(Czech Republic) Tereza Voborníková	167

==== Relay ====
Rank	final standings after 5 events	Points
1	France	355
2	Sweden	350
3	Norway	333
4	Italy	242
5	Czech Republic	241

==== Nations Cup ====
Rank	final standings after 21 events	Points
1	Sweden	6956
2	France	6920
3	Norway	6402
4	Italy	6037
5	Germany	5815

== Mixed Relay ==
No.	Date	Place (In brackets Stage)	Winner	Second	Third	Leader (After competition)	R.
Single Mixed Relay – 6 km + 7.5 km
1	30 November 2025	(Sweden) Östersund (1)	Sweden: 1. Sebastian Samuelsson; 2. Ella Halvarsson	Norway: 1. Sturla Holm Lægreid; 2. Maren Kirkeeide	France: 1. Fabien Claude; 2. Camille Bened	Sweden	
3	24 January 2026	(Czech Republic) Nové Město (6)	Finland: 1. Suvi Minkkinen; 2. Tero Seppälä	France: 1. Jeanne Richard; 2. Émilien Claude	Norway: 1. Juni Arnekleiv; 2. Martin Nevland	France	
5	15 March 2026	(Estonia) Otepää (8)	Norway: 1. Sturla Holm Lægreid; 2. Karoline Offigstad Knotten	Sweden: 1. Sebastian Samuelsson; 2. Hanna Öberg	Finland: 1. Tero Seppälä; 2. Suvi Minkkinen	Norway	
Mixed Relay – 4 x 6 km
2	30 November 2025	(Sweden) Östersund (1)	France: 1. Émilien Jacquelin; 2. Éric Perrot; 3. Justine Braisaz-Bouchet; 4. Lou Jeanmonnot	Italy: 1. Tommaso Giacomel; 2. Lukas Hofer; 3. Dorothea Wierer; 4. Lisa Vittozzi	Norway: 1. Endre Strømsheim; 2. Johan-Olav Botn; 3. Karoline Offigstad Knotten; 4. Ingrid Landmark Tandrevold	France	
4	24 January 2026	(Czech Republic) Nové Město (6)	Italy: 1. Dorothea Wierer; 2. Lisa Vittozzi; 3. Lukas Hofer; 4. Tommaso Giacomel	France: 1. Océane Michelon; 2. Justine Braisaz-Bouchet; 3. Oscar Lombardot; 4. Quentin Fillon Maillet	Czech Republic: 1. Jessica Jislová; 2. Tereza Voborníková; 3. Vítězslav Hornig; 4. Michal Krčmář	France	
—	8 February 2026	(Italy) Antholz-Anterselva (OG)	(gold) France: 1. Éric Perrot; 2. Quentin Fillon Maillet; 3. Lou Jeanmonnot; 4. Julia Simon	(silver) Italy: 1. Tommaso Giacomel; 2. Lukas Hofer; 3. Dorothea Wierer; 4. Lisa Vittozzi	(bronze) Germany: 1. Justus Strelow; 2. Philipp Nawrath; 3. Vanessa Voigt; 4. Franziska Preuß	not included in the World Cup	
6	15 March 2026	(Estonia) Otepää (8)	Sweden: 1. Viktor Brandt; 2. Martin Ponsiluoma; 3. Anna-Karin Heijdenberg; 4. Elvira Öberg	Switzerland: 1. Sebastian Stalder; 2. Joscha Burkhalter; 3. Aita Gasparin; 4. Lena Häcki-Groß	United States: 1. Maxime Germain; 2. Campbell Wright; 3. Deedra Irwin; 4. Margie Freed	Norway	

=== Standings ===
Rank	final standings after 6 events	Points
	Norway	385
2	Sweden	376
3	France	342
4	Finland	308
5	Italy	292

== Podium table by nation ==
Table showing the World Cup podium places (gold–1st place, silver–2nd place, bronze–3rd place) by the countries represented by the athletes.

final standings after all 58 competitions.

Rank	Nation	Gold	Silver	Bronze	Total
1	Norway	18	10	14	42
2	France	16	23	13	52
3	Sweden	12	8	14	34
4	Italy	9	7	5	21
5	Finland	2	6	1	9
6	Austria	1	0	0	1
7	Germany	0	2	6	8
8	United States	0	1	1	2
9	Switzerland	0	1	0	1
10	Czech Republic	0	0	3	3
11	Slovakia	0	0	1	1
Totals (11 entries)		58	58	58	174

== Points distribution ==
The table shows the number of points won in the 2025–26 Biathlon World Cup for men and women. Relay events do not impact individual rankings.

Place	1	2	3	4	5	6	7	8	9	10	11	12	13	14	15	16	17	18	19	20	21	22	23	24	25	26	27	28	29	30	31	32	33	34	35	36	37	38	39	40
Individual	90	75	65	55	50	45	41	37	34	31	30	29	28	27	26	25	24	23	22	21	20	19	18	17	16	15	14	13	12	11	10	9	8	7	6	5	4	3	2	1
Sprint	90	75	65	55	50	45	41	37	34	31	30	29	28	27	26	25	24	23	22	21	20	19	18	17	16	15	14	13	12	11	10	9	8	7	6	5	4	3	2	1
Pursuit	90	75	65	55	50	45	41	37	34	31	30	29	28	27	26	25	24	23	22	21	20	19	18	17	16	15	14	13	12	11	10	9	8	7	6	5	4	3	2	1
Mass Start	90	75	65	55	50	45	41	37	34	31	30	29	28	27	26	25	24	23	22	21	20	18	16	14	12	10	8	6	4	2

== Achievements ==
First World Cup career victory

Men

- (Norway) Johan-Olav Botn (26), in his 3rd season – Individual in Östersund

Women

- (Finland) Suvi Minkkinen (30), in her 9th season – Sprint in Östersund
- (Norway) Maren Kirkeeide (22), in her 4th season – Mass Start in Annecy–Le Grand-Bornand

First World Cup podium

Men

- (United States) Campbell Wright (23), in his 6th season – Mass Start in Nové Město na Moravě – 2nd place
- (Germany) Philipp Horn (31), in his 8th season – Sprint in Hochfilzen – 3rd place
- (Norway) Isak Leknes Frey (22), in his 2nd season – Sprint in Ruhpolding – 3rd place
- (Norway) Sverre Dahlen Aspenes (28), in his 2nd season – Mass Start in Nové Město na Moravě – 3rd place

Women

- (Finland) Sonja Leinamo (23), in her 4th season – Individual in Östersund – 2nd place
- (France) Camille Bened (25), in her 2nd season – Individual in Östersund – 3rd place
- (Czech Republic) Tereza Voborníková (25), in her 7th season – Mass Start in Oslo Holmenkollen – 3rd place

Team

- United States – Mixed Relay in Otepää – 3rd place

Number of wins this season (in brackets are all-time wins)

Men

- (Norway) Sturla Holm Lægreid – 5 (20)
- (France) Éric Perrot – 4 (7)
- (Italy) Tommaso Giacomel – 4 (5)
- (Norway) Johan-Olav Botn – 4 (4)
- (France) Quentin Fillon Maillet – 1 (16)
- (Norway) Vetle Sjåstad Christiansen – 1 (7)
- (Sweden) Sebastian Samuelsson – 1 (7)
- (Norway) Johannes Dale-Skjevdal – 1 (4)

Women

- (Sweden) Hanna Öberg – 4 (12)
- (France) Lou Jeanmonnot – 3 (15)
- (France) Julia Simon – 3 (14)
- (Sweden) Elvira Öberg – 3 (13)
- (Italy) Lisa Vittozzi – 3 (10)
- (Italy) Dorothea Wierer – 1 (17)
- (France) Justine Braisaz-Bouchet – 1 (11)
- (Austria) Lisa Theresa Hauser – 1 (6)
- (Finland) Suvi Minkkinen – 1 (1)
- (Norway) Maren Kirkeeide – 1 (1)

== Retirements ==
The following notable biathletes, who competed in the World Cup, retired during or after the 2025–26 season:

Men

- (Norway) Sivert Guttorm Bakken (†23 December 2025)
- (Belgium) César Beauvais
- (Canada) Haldan Borglum
- (United States) Jake Brown
- (Italy) Daniele Cappellari
- (Slovakia) Damián Cesnek
- (Lithuania) Karol Dombrovski
- (Austria) Simon Eder
- (France) Antonin Guigonnat
- (Slovakia) Artur Iskhakov
- (Sweden) Anton Ivarsson
- (Lithuania) Tomas Kaukėnas
- (Austria) David Komatz
- (Germany) Johannes Kühn
- (Canada) Logan Pletz
- (Russia) Nikita Porshnev
- (Finland) Joni Pykäläinen
- (Slovenia) Matic Repnik
- (Canada) Adam Runnalls
- (United States) Paul Schommer
- (Bulgaria) Anton Sinapov
- (Slovakia) Tomáš Sklenárik
- (Czech Republic) Jakub Štvrtecký
- (Japan) Mikito Tachizaki
- (Czech Republic) Adam Václavík
- (Slovenia) Anton Vidmar
- (United Kingdom) Marcus Bolin Webb

Women

- (Slovakia) Paulína Bátovská Fialková
- (Ukraine) Nadiia Bielkina
- (Switzerland) Irene Cadurisch
- (Germany) Juliane Frühwirt
- (Austria) Lisa Theresa Hauser
- (Russia) Larisa Kuklina
- (Austria) Julia Leitinger
- (Slovakia) Júlia Machyniaková
- (Switzerland) Susanna Meinen
- (Russia) Svetlana Mironova
- (Canada) Benita Peiffer
- (Germany) Franziska Preuß
- (United States) Joanne Reid
- (Norway) Marit Ishol Skogan
- (Italy) Dorothea Wierer

== See also ==
- 2025–26 Biathlon IBU Cup (as the second highest competition series of IBU).
- 2026 Winter Olympics
- 2026 IBU Open European Championships
- 2026 IBU Junior Open European Championships
- Biathlon Junior World Championships 2026
