= Suvi Minkkinen =

Finnish biathlete (born 1994)

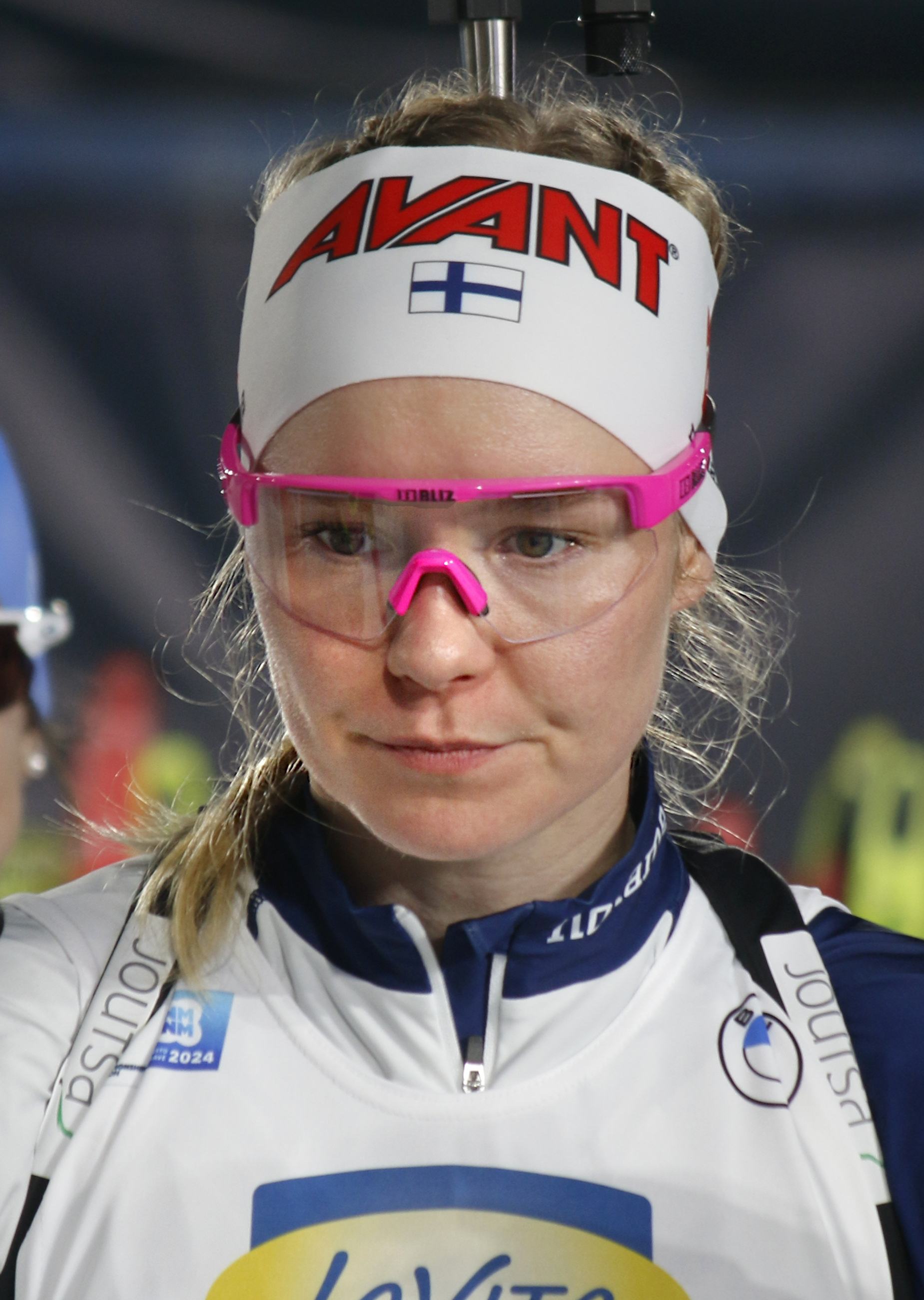
- Minkkinen in 2024

Personal information
- Nationality: Finnish
- Born: 8 December 1994 (age 31) Joutsa, Finland
- Years active: 2007–

Sport

Professional information
- Club: Joutsan Pommi
- World Cup debut: 2017

Olympic Games
- Teams: 3 (2018, 2022, 2026)
- Medals: 1 (0 gold)

World Championships
- Teams: 6 (2019–2025)
- Medals: 1 (0 gold)
Medal record
Women's biathlon
Representing Finland
Olympic Games
Bronze medal – third place	2026 Milano Cortina	10 km pursuit
World Championships
Bronze medal – third place	2025 Lenzerheide	7.5 km sprint

Suvi Minkkinen (born 8 December 1994) is a Finnish biathlete. She made her World Cup debut in 2017 in Östersund, Sweden. At the club level, she represents Joutsan Pommi. In addition to biathlon, she has also competed in cross-country skiing at the national level.

She participated in her first Olympics at the 2018 Winter Olympics. At the 2026 Winter Olympics she won bronze in the Women's pursuit event, becoming the first Finnish female to medal in biathlon at the Olympic games.

== Biathlon results ==
All results are sourced from the International Biathlon Union.

=== Olympic Games ===
1 medal

Event	Individual	Sprint	Pursuit	Mass start	Relay	Mixed relay
(South Korea) 2018 Pyeongchang	69th	—	—	—	—	—
(China) 2022 Beijing	DNS	51st	43rd	—	16th	11th
(Italy) 2026 Milano-Cortina	20th	6th	Bronze	19th	7th	6th

=== World Championships ===
1 medal

Event	Individual	Sprint	Pursuit	Mass start	Relay	Mixed relay	Single Mixed relay
(Sweden) 2019 Östersund	56th	73rd	—	—	22nd	—	—
(Italy) 2020 Rasen-Antholz	39th	80th	—	—	11th	—	—
(Slovenia) 2021 Pokljuka	57th	85th	—	—	14th	13th	—
(Germany) 2023 Oberhof	8th	35th	24th	25th	13th	11th	10th
(Czech Republic) 2024 Nové Město	23rd	47th	29th	—	17th	20th	12th
(Switzerland) 2025 Lenzerheide	4th	Bronze	6th	8th	15th	9th	10th

*During Olympic seasons competitions are only held for those events not included in the Olympic program.

=== World Cup ===
Season	Overall		Individual		Sprint		Pursuit		Mass start	
Season	Points	Position	Points	Position	Points	Position	Points	Position	Points	Position
2019-20	37	70th	2	65th	21	65th	14	59th	–	–
2020-21	24	76th	–	–	5	85th	19	60th	–	–
2021-22	148	43rd	–	–	49	45th	81	28th	18	41st
2022-23	228	27th	10	57th	98	23rd	91	22nd	29	34th
2023-24	113	42nd	12	57th	61	37th	40	43rd	–	–
2024-25	694	7th	90	9th	271	4th	164	10th	169	8th
2025-26	881	5th	68	17th	315	5th	380	2nd	118	10th

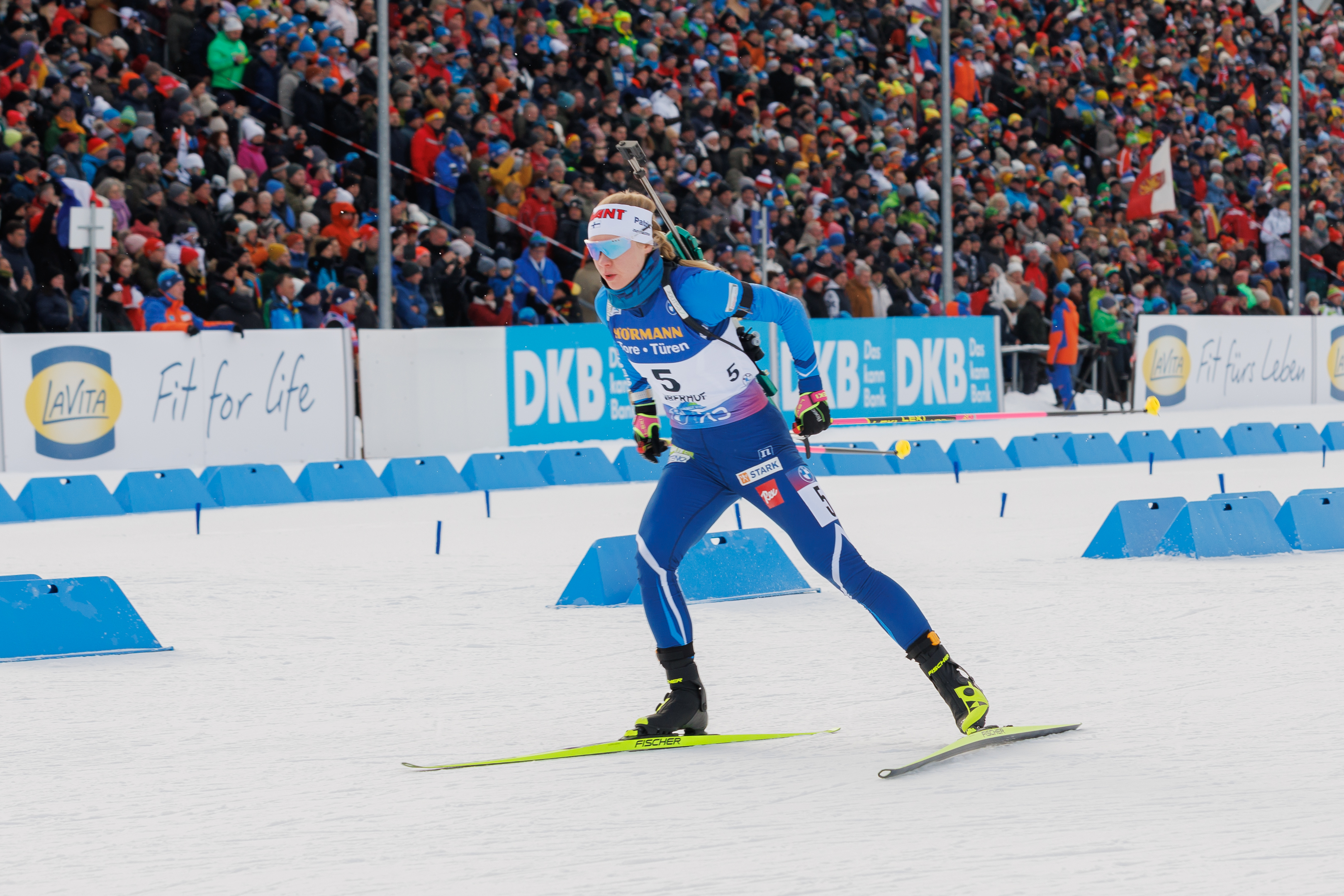
Suvi Minkkinen in 2025

==== Individual podiums ====
No.	Season	Date	Location	Level	Race	Place
1	2024–25	7 December 2024	(Finland) Kontiolahti	World Cup	Sprint	3rd
2	2024–25	14 February 2025	(Switzerland) Lenzerheide	World Championships	Sprint	3rd
3	2024–25	21 March 2025	(Norway) Oslo	World Cup	Sprint	3rd
4	2025–26	5 December 2025	(Sweden) Östersund	World Cup	Sprint	1st
5	2025–26	7 December 2025	(Sweden) Östersund	World Cup	Pursuit	2nd
6	2025–26	20 December 2025	(France) Annecy–Le Grand-Bornand	World Cup	Pursuit	2nd
7	2025–26	8 January 2026	(Germany) Oberhof	World Cup	Sprint	2nd
8	2025–26	11 January 2026	(Germany) Oberhof	World Cup	Pursuit	2nd
9	2025–26	15 February 2026	(Italy) Milano-Cortina	Winter Olympic Games	Pursuit	3rd
10	2025–26	14 March 2026	(Estonia) Otepää	World Cup	Pursuit	2nd

==== Relay podiums ====
No.	Season	Date	Location	Level	Race	Place	Teammate
1	2023–24	3 March 2024	(Norway) Oslo Holmenkollen	World Cup	Single Mixed Relay	3rd	Otto Invenius
2	2024–25	12 January 2025	(Germany) Oberhof	World Cup	Single Mixed Relay	1st	Tero Seppälä
3	2024–25	16 March 2025	(Slovenia) Pokljuka	World Cup	Single Mixed Relay	3rd	Tero Seppälä
4	2025–26	24 January 2026	(Czech Republic) Nové Město	World Cup	Single Mixed Relay	1st	Tero Seppälä
5	2025–26	15 March 2026	(Estonia) Otepää	World Cup	Single Mixed Relay	3rd	Tero Seppälä
