= Anne de Besche =

Danish biathlete (born 2000)

Personal information
- Full name: Anne Bünemann de Besche
- Citizenship: Dual (Danish and Norwegian)
- Born: 27 May 2000 (age 26) Oslo, Norway

Sport
- Country: Denmark (since 2025); Norway (until 2025)
- Sport: Biathlon
- Coached by: Svenn-Arne Nordheim
Medal record
Women's biathlon
Representing Norway
Youth World Championships
| Gold medal – first place | 2019 Brezno-Osrblie | 3 × 6 km relay |

Anne Bünemann de Besche (born 27 May 2000) is a Danish biathlete who is participating in the 2026 Winter Olympics in Milano Cortina.

== Career ==
In 2019, she was part of the team that won Youth World Championship gold in the relay for Norway.

In 2025, De Besche switched from the Norwegian national biathlon team to the Danish team due to her dual citizenship. In September 2025, she also became Norwegian champion in summer biathlon, and she finished fourth at the Norwegian season opening in early December of the same year. In January 2026, she represented Denmark in the World Cup for the first time and was subsequently selected for the 2026 Winter Olympics in Milan and Cortina d'Ampezzo for the first time in her career.

At the 2026 Games, De Besche finished 16th in the women's sprint competition, which was the best Danish Olympic result in biathlon ever.

== Biathlon results ==
All results are sourced from the International Biathlon Union.

=== Olympic Games ===
0 medal

| Event | Individual | Sprint | Pursuit | Mass start | Relay | Mixed relay |
|---|---|---|---|---|---|---|
| (Italy) 2026 Milano Cortina | 70th | 16th | 20th | 29th | — | — |
