= Sam Parmantier =

Belgian biathlete (born 2005)

Personal information
- Born: 20 March 2005 (age 21) Verviers, Belgium

Sport

Professional information
- Sport: Biathlon
- World Cup debut: 12 December 2025
Medal record
Women's biathlon
Representing Belgium

Sam Parmantier (born 20 March 2005 in Verviers) is a Belgian biathlete. He made his debut in the World Cup in 2025. He represented Belgium at the 2026 Winter Olympics.

== Personal life ==
Parmantier studied in Malmedy at the Institut Notre Dames technical school where he finished his secondary education with a diploma in electrical automation. He is studying for a degree in STAPS (Science and Technology of Physical and Sports Activities) at the Université Grenoble Alpes.

== Biathlon results ==
All results are sourced from the International Biathlon Union.

=== Olympic Games ===
0 medals

Event	Individual	Sprint	Pursuit	Mass start	Relay	Mixed relay
(Italy) 2026 Milano Cortina	—	—	—	—	19th	—

=== Youth and Junior World Championships ===
0 medals

Event	Individual	Sprint	Pursuit	Mass start	Relay	Mixed relay
(Austria) 2021 Obertilliach	97th	94th	—	—N/a	23th	—
(United States) 2022 Soldier Hollow	28th	58th	55th	—N/a	15th	—
(Kazakhstan) 2023 Shchuchinsk	43th	47th	40th	—N/a	15th	16th
(Estonia) 2024 Otepää	19th	10th	—N/a	35th	—	10th
(Sweden) 2025 Östersund	52nd	55th	—N/a	57th	—	15th
(Germany) 2026 Arber	35th	34th	—N/a	30th	—	—

*During Olympic seasons competitions are only held for those events not included in the Olympic program.
**The single mixed relay was added as an event in 2019.
