= Martin Uldal =

Norwegian biathlete (born 2001)

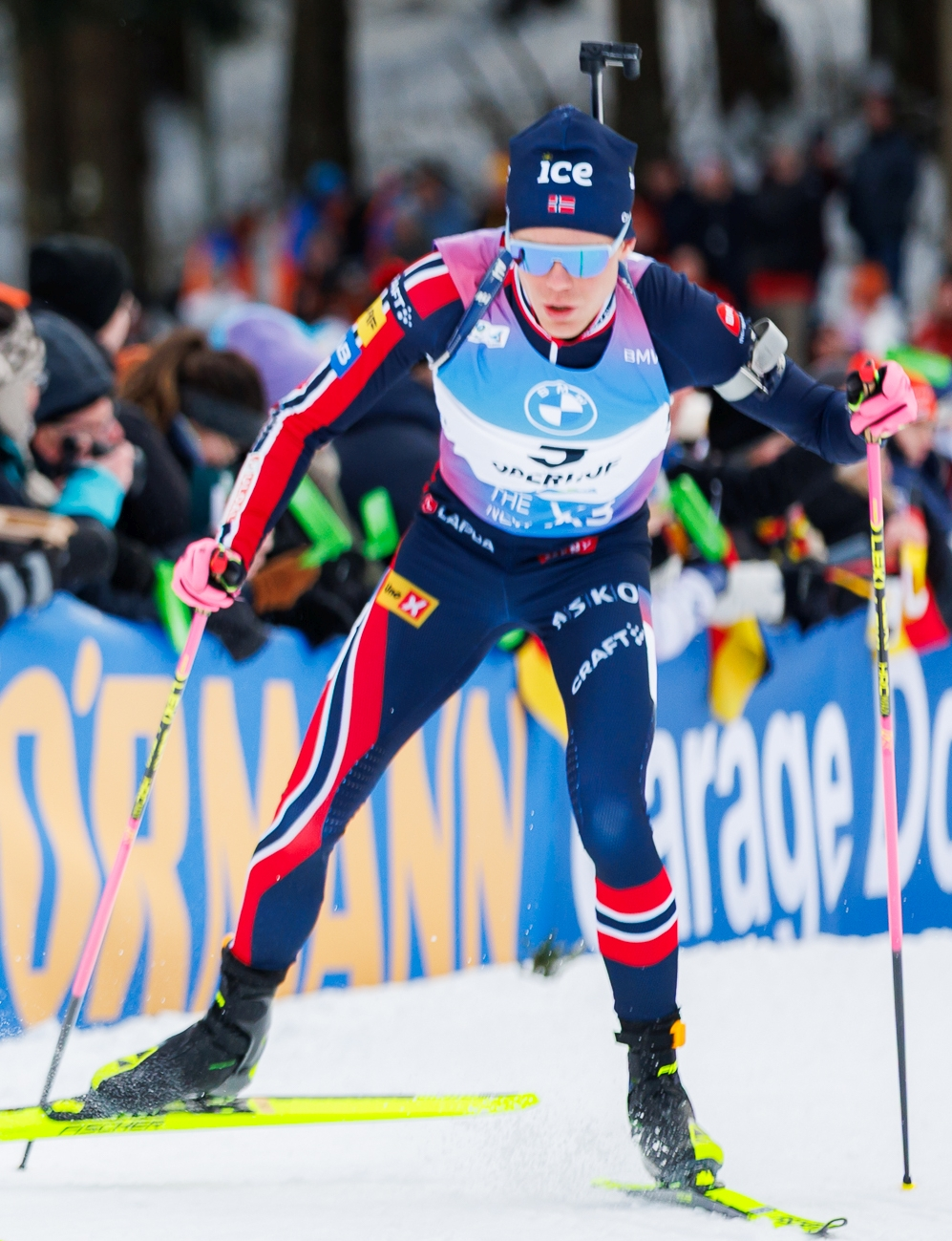
- Uldal in 2025

Personal information
- Nationality: Norwegian
- Born: 23 May 2001 (age 25) Kristiansand, Norway

Sport
- Country: Norway
- Sport: Biathlon

Olympic Games
- Teams: 1 (2026)
- Medals: 1 (0 gold)

World Championships
- Teams: 1 (2025)

World Cup
- Seasons: 3 (2022, 2025 – 2026)
- Individual races: 38
- All races: 45
- Individual victories: 1
- All victories: 3
- Individual podiums: 5
- All podiums: 10
- Overall titles: 0
- Discipline titles: 0
Medal record
Men's biathlon
Representing Norway
Olympic Games
Silver medal – second place	2026 Milano Cortina	4 × 7.5 km relay
European Championships
Bronze medal – third place	2024 Osrblie	20 km individual
Junior World Championships
Bronze medal – third place	2022 Soldier Hollow	15 km individual
Bronze medal – third place	2022 Soldier Hollow	10 km sprint
Bronze medal – third place	2022 Soldier Hollow	12.5 km pursuit
Bronze medal – third place	2022 Soldier Hollow	4 × 7.5 km relay
Youth World Championships
Gold medal – first place	2020 Lenzerheide	3 × 7.5 km relay
- Updated on 22 March 2026

Martin Uldal (born 23 May 2001) is a Norwegian biathlete. He made his debut in the Biathlon World Cup in 2022. Uldal is a bronze medallist at the 2024 European Championships in the individual race.

== Career ==
Martin Uldal's first international championship was the European Youth Olympic Festival in 2019, where he did not achieve top-10 placements. The following year, he participated in the Youth World Championships in Lenzerheide, winning gold in the relay event but missing individual medals due to shooting misses. He made a strong comeback at the Junior World Championships in 2022, winning bronze medals in all disciplines, including the relay race, and becoming the most successful athlete of the championship. He earned his first World Cup points at the season finale in Oslo in 2022/23. Uldal was then included in the B-team of the national team for the 2022/23 season and competed in the IBU Cup, winning races in Idre and Ridnaun. He finished sixth overall in the IBU Cup standings. In the 2023/24 season at the IBU Cup, he won two races and finished runner-up on seven other occasions. At the end of the season he finished fourth in the overall standings.

== Biathlon results ==
All results are sourced from the International Biathlon Union.

=== Olympic Games ===
1 medal (1 silver)

Event	Individual	Sprint	Pursuit	Mass start	Relay	Mixed relay
(Italy) 2026 Milano Cortina	13th	—	—	—	Silver	4th

=== World Championship ===
0 medal

Event	Individual	Sprint	Pursuit	Mass start	Relay	Mixed relay	Single mixed relay
(Switzerland) 2025 Lenzerheide	43th	6th	12th	21st	—	—	—

*During Olympic seasons competitions are only held for those events not included in the Olympic program.
**The single mixed relay was added as an event in 2019.

=== World Cup ===
==== Season standings ====
Season	Age	Overall			Individual		Sprint		Pursuit		Mass start	
Season	Age	Races	Points	Position	Points	Position	Points	Position	Points	Position	Points	Position
2021–22	20	2/22	35	75th	—	—	21	68th	14	65th	—	—
2024–25	23	15/21	599	11th	—	—	284	4th	192	10th	123	15th
2025–26	24	16/21	609	12th	120	6th	201	13th	219	13th	69	21st

==== Individual podiums ====
- 1 victories – (1 Sp)
- 5 podiums

No.	Season	Date	Location	Level	Race	Place
1	2024–25	19 December 2024	(France) Annecy–Le Grand-Bornand	World Cup	Sprint	1st
2	2025–26	3 December 2025	(Sweden) Östersund	World Cup	Individual	2nd
3	2025–26	6 December 2025	(Sweden) Östersund	World Cup	Sprint	2nd
4	2025–26	10 January 2026	(Germany) Oberhof	World Cup	Pursuit	2nd
5	2025–26	14 March 2026	(Estonia) Otepää	World Cup	Pursuit	3rd

=== Youth and Junior World Championships ===
5 medals (1 gold, 4 bronze)

Year	Age	Individual	Sprint	Pursuit	Relay
(Switzerland) 2020 Lenzerheide	18	6th	14th	7rd	Gold
(United States) 2022 Soldier Hollow	20	Bronze	Bronze	Bronze	Bronze
