= Viktor Brandt =

Swedish biathlete (born 1999)

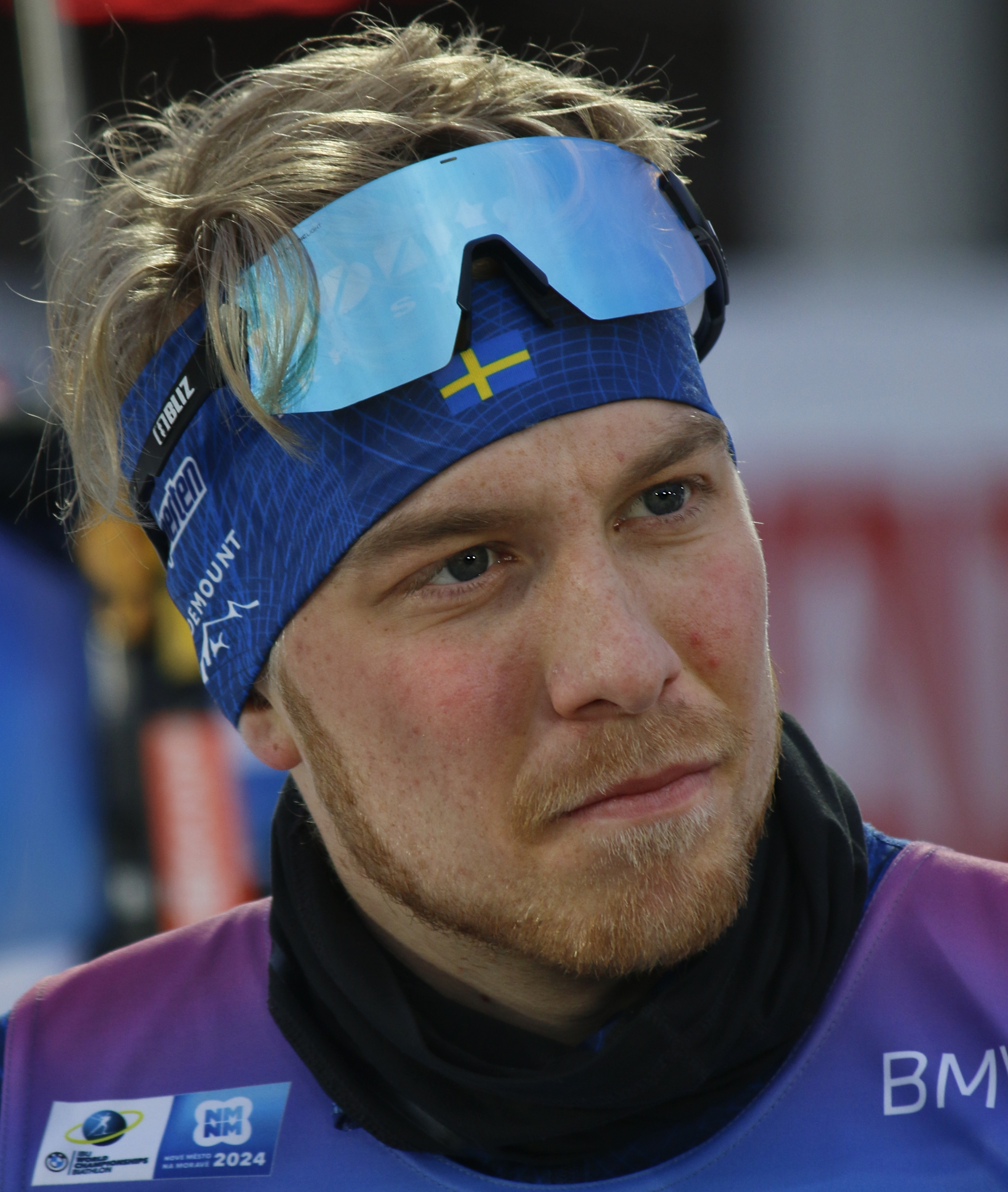
- Brandt in 2024

Personal information
- Nationality: Swedish
- Born: 8 July 1999 (age 27) Karlstad, Sweden

Sport
- Country: Sweden
- Sport: Biathlon
Medal record
Men's biathlon
Representing Sweden
Olympic Games
Bronze medal – third place	2026 Milano Cortina	4 × 7.5 km relay
World Championships
Gold medal – first place	2024 Nové Město	4 × 7.5 km relay

Viktor Jonas Brandt (born 8 July 1999) is a Swedish biathlete. He is the 2024 World Champion in the Men's Relay.

== Career ==
Viktor Brandt competed in the Youth World Championships for the first time in 2017, but did not achieve any special results. He took part in the season highlight every year in the following years until 2021, but did not compete at senior level. However, the races at junior level were rarely successful for Brandt, only achieving a result in the top 30 in 2021 with 26th place in the sprint at the Junior World Championships. The Swede celebrated his debut in the IBU Cup in Idre in November 2021 and immediately finished 17th in the sprint. He then confirmed his good form with a seventh place in the second sprint in Idre, and his first podium finish came after the turn of the year in the single-mixed relay in Obertilliach alongside Elisabeth Högberg behind the Russian team. Brandt also took part in the European Championships and finished 21st in the individual race. The Swede also competed almost exclusively in the IBU Cup in the 2022/23 season, achieving a seventh place in the mass start 60 in Ridnaun and narrowly missing out on another podium finish with Ella Halvarsson in Canmore. As Emil Nykvist was unable to compete due to illness, he made his World Cup debut in Östersund at the end of the season and finished 47th in the individual race. In the winter of 2023/24, Brandt competed in the season-opening individual event in Östersund, but was then transferred to the IBU Cup. However, as he impressed in Sjusjøen with three top 10 finishes, including fifth place in the sprint, the Swede was called back into the World Cup after the turn of the year, reached the first pursuit race at the highest level in Oberhof and scored his first World Cup points with 32nd place in the short individual race in Antholz.

At the 2024 World Championships in Nové Město, Czech Republic, he became the champion in the relay race together with Jesper Nelin, Martin Ponsiluoma and Sebastian Samuelsson.

== Personal life ==
Viktor Brandt lives at the biathlon base in Östersund. He studies computer science at Mid Sweden University, also in Östersund. Brandt's brother Oskar, who is four years older, is also a biathlete.

== Biathlon results ==
All results are sourced from the International Biathlon Union.

=== Olympic results ===
1 medal (1 bronze)

Event	Individual	Sprint	Pursuit	Mass start	Relay	Mixed relay
(Italy) 2026 Milano Cortina	37th	—N/a	—N/a	—N/a	Bronze	—N/a

=== World Championships ===
1 medal (1 gold)

Event	Individual	Sprint	Pursuit	Mass start	Relay	Mixed relay	Single mixed relay
(Czech Republic) 2024 Nové Město	—	24th	33th	—	Gold	—	—
(Switzerland) 2025 Lenzerheide	42nd	60th	51st	—	4th	—	—

=== World Cup ===
Season	Overall		Individual		Sprint		Pursuit		Mass start	
Season	Points	Position	Points	Position	Points	Position	Points	Position	Points	Position
2022–23	Didn't earn World Cup points									
2023–24	32	62nd	26	35th	4	68th	2	78th	—	—
2024–25	151	40th	11	53rd	38	45th	90	24th	12	42nd
2025–26	184	29th	36	34th	86	27th	46	39th	16	40th

==== Relay podiums ====
No.	Season	Date	Location	Level	Race	Place	Teammate(s)
1	2023–24	17 February 2024	(Czech Republic) Nové Město	World Championships	Relay	1st	Nelin, Ponsiluoma, Samuelsson
2	2024–25	1 December 2024	(Finland) Kontiolahti	World Cup	Relay	3rd	Nelin, Ponsiluoma, Samuelsson
3	2024–25	15 December 2024	(Austria) Hochfilzen	World Cup	Relay	3rd	Nelin, Ponsiluoma, Samuelsson
4	2024–25	17 January 2025	(Germany) Ruhpolding	World Cup	Relay	2nd	Nelin, Ponsiluoma, Samuelsson
5	2024–25	25 January 2025	(Italy) Antholz	World Cup	Relay	3rd	Nelin, Ponsiluoma, Samuelsson
6	2025–26	29 November 2025	(Sweden) Östersund	World Cup	Relay	3rd	Nelin, Ponsiluoma, Samuelsson
7	2025–26	7 March 2026	(Finland) Kontiolahti	World Cup	Relay	3rd	Nelin, Ponsiluoma, Samuelsson
8	2025–26	15 March 2026	(Estonia) Otepää	World Cup	Mixed Relay	1st	Ponsiluoma, Heijdenberg, Öberg

=== Youth and Junior World Championships ===
Year	Age	Individual	Sprint	Pursuit	Relay
(Slovakia) 2017 Brezno-Osrblie	17	73rd	70th	—	16th
(Estonia) 2018 Otepää	18	52nd	66th	—	13rd
(Slovakia) 2019 Brezno-Osrblie	19	78th	52nd	54th	14th
(Switzerland) 2020 Lenzerheide	20	93rd	DNF	—	—
(Austria) 2021 Obertilliach	21	40th	26th	48th	9th
