= Éric Perrot =

French biathlete (born 2001)

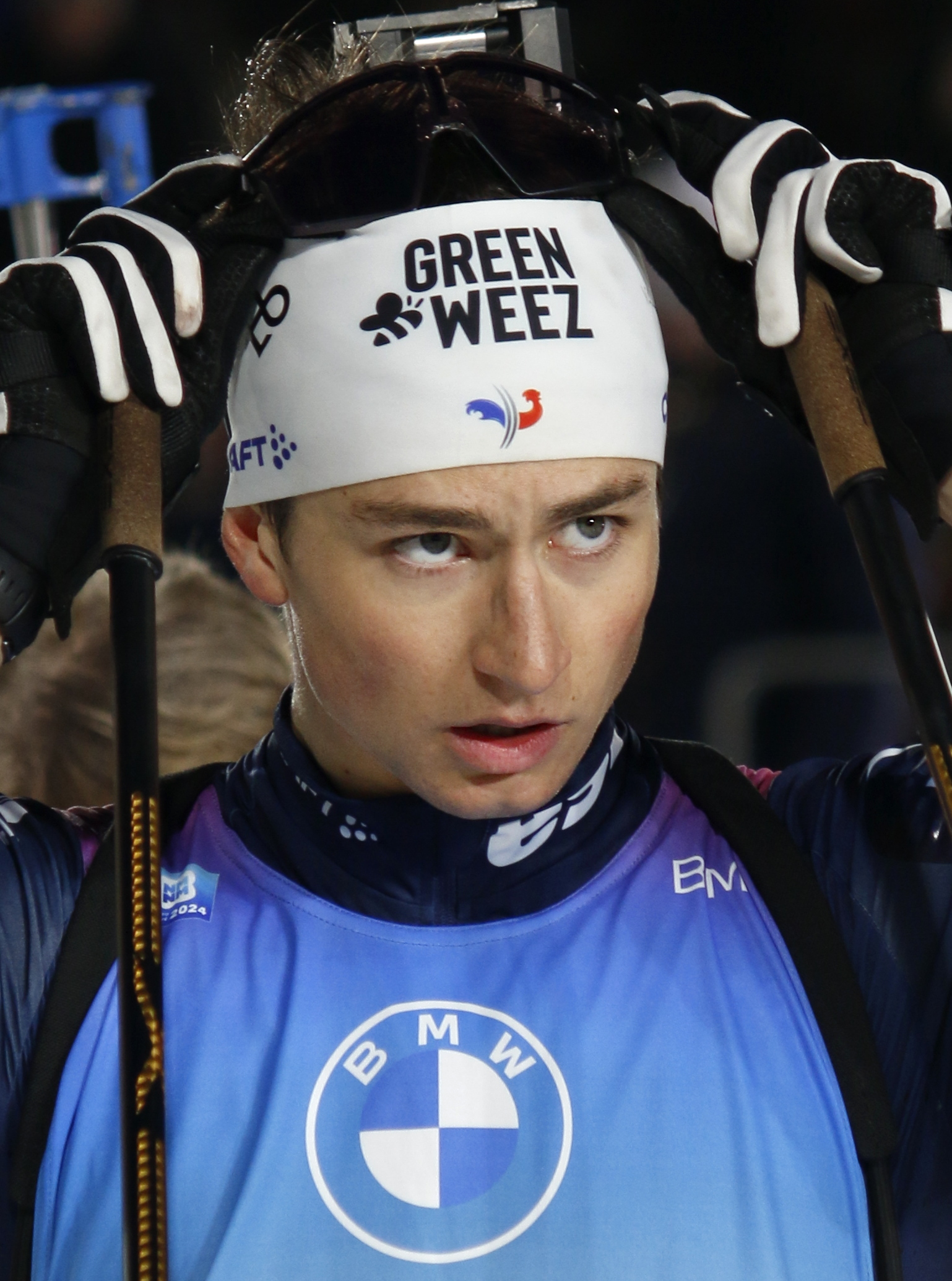
- Perrot in 2024

Personal information
- Nationality: French
- Born: 29 June 2001 (age 25) Bourg-Saint-Maurice, France

Sport

Professional information
- Sport: Biathlon
- Club: Peisey Vallandry
- IBU Cup debut: 2020
- World Cup debut: 2021

World Championships
- Teams: 3 (2023–2025)
- Medals: 6 (3 gold)

World Cup
- Seasons: 4 (2020/21–)
- Individual victories: 1
- All victories: 3
- Overall titles: 1 (2025–26)
- Discipline titles: 3: 1 Individual (2025–26), 1 Pursuit (2025–26), 1 Mass Start (2025–26)

European/IBU Cup
- Seasons: 3 (2020/21–2022/23)
Medal record
Men's biathlon
Representing France
Olympic Games
Gold medal – first place	2026 Milano Cortina	4 × 7.5 km relay
Gold medal – first place	2026 Milano Cortina	Mixed relay
Silver medal – second place	2026 Milano Cortina	20 km individual
World Championships
Gold medal – first place	2024 Nové Město	Mixed relay
Gold medal – first place	2025 Lenzerheide	20 km individual
Gold medal – first place	2025 Lenzerheide	Mixed relay
Silver medal – second place	2025 Lenzerheide	4 × 7.5 km relay
Bronze medal – third place	2024 Nové Město	4 × 7.5 km relay
Bronze medal – third place	2025 Lenzerheide	12.5 km pursuit
Junior World Championships
Gold medal – first place	2021 Obertilliach	Relay
Silver medal – second place	2021 Obertilliach	Pursuit
Youth World Championships
Bronze medal – third place	2020 Lenzerheide	Individual

Éric Perrot (French pronunciation: [erik pɛʁo]; born 29 June 2001) is a French biathlete who competes in the Biathlon World Cup. He is a three-time Olympic medalist, winning gold in 2026 in the Mixed relay and Men's relay events and silver in the 20 km individual event. He was the overall World Cup title winner for the 2025–26 season.

== Personal life ==
Perrot is the son of French biathlete Franck Perrot and Norwegian biathlete Tone Marit Oftedal.

== Biathlon results ==
All results are sourced from the International Biathlon Union.

=== Olympic Games ===
3 medals (2 gold)

Event	Individual	Sprint	Pursuit	Mass start	Relay	Mixed relay
(Italy) 2026 Milano Cortina	Silver	9th	4th	20th	Gold	Gold

=== World Championships ===
6 medals (3 gold, 1 silver, 2 bronze)

Event	Individual	Sprint	Pursuit	Mass start	Relay	Mixed relay	Single mixed relay
(Germany) 2023 Oberhof	32nd	49th	32nd	—	—	—	—
(Czech Republic) 2024 Nové Město	8th	4th	14th	9th	Bronze	Gold	—
(Switzerland) 2025 Lenzerheide	Gold	14th	Bronze	7th	Silver	Gold	—

=== World Cup ===
World Cup rankings

Season	Overall		Individual		Sprint		Pursuit		Mass start	
Season	Points	Position	Points	Position	Points	Position	Points	Position	Points	Position
2020–21	-	-	-	-	-	-	-	-	-	-
2021–22	43	68th	-	-	34	61st	9	70th	-	-
2022–23	189	34th	76	13th	27	49th	26	48th	60	26th
2023–24	622	11th	89	11th	232	11th	227	11th	74	21st
2024–25	926	3rd	111	5th	250	7th	251	5th	314	2nd
2025–26	1263	1st	211	1st	335	3rd	412	1st	305	1st

Individual podiums

- 8 victories (3 mass start, 3 individual, 1 sprint, 1 pursuit)
- 21 podiums

No.	Season	Date	Location	Discipline	Level	Place
1	2022–23	12 March 2023	(Sweden) Östersund	15 km Mass Start	World Cup	3rd
2	2023–24	9 March 2024	(United States) Soldier Hollow	10 km Sprint	World Cup	1st
3	2023–24	16 March 2024	(Canada) Canmore	12.5 km Pursuit	World Cup	3rd
4	2024–25	8 December 2024	(Finland) Kontiolahti	15 km Mass Start	World Cup	1st
5	2024–25	21 December 2024	(France) Annecy	12.5 km Pursuit	World Cup	2nd
6	2024–25	16 February 2025	(Switzerland) Lenzerheide	12.5 km Pursuit	World Championships	3rd
7	2024–25	19 February 2025	(Switzerland) Lenzerheide	20 km Individual	World Championships	1st
8	2024–25	15 March 2025	(Slovenia) Pokljuka	15 km Mass Start	World Cup	1st
9	2024–25	23 March 2025	(Norway) Oslo	15 km Mass Start	World Cup	2nd
10	2025–26	12 December 2025	(Austria) Hochfilzen	10 km Sprint	World Cup	2nd
11	2025–26	13 December 2025	(Austria) Hochfilzen	12.5 km Pursuit	World Cup	1st
12	2025–26	21 December 2025	(France) Annecy	15 km Mass Start	World Cup	2nd
13	2025–26	18 January 2026	(Germany) Ruhpolding	12.5 km Pursuit	World Cup	2nd
14	2025–26	22 January 2026	(Czech Republic) Nové Město	15 km Short Individual	World Cup	1st
15	2025–26	25 January 2026	(Czech Republic) Nové Město	15 km Mass Start	World Cup	1st
16	2025–26	10 February 2026	(Italy) Antholz	20 km Individual	Olympic Games	2nd
17	2025–26	6 March 2026	(Finland) Kontiolahti	20 km Individual	World Cup	1st
18	2025–26	8 March 2026	(Finland) Kontiolahti	15 km Mass Start	World Cup	2nd
19	2025–26	20 March 2026	(Norway) Oslo	10 km Sprint	World Cup	3rd
20	2025–26	21 March 2026	(Norway) Oslo	12.5 km Pursuit	World Cup	2nd
21	2025–26	22 March 2026	(Norway) Oslo	15 km Mass Start	World Cup	3rd

*Results are from UIPMB and IBU races which include the Biathlon World Cup, Biathlon World Championships and Olympic Games.

Relay victories

- 8 victories

No.	Season	Date	Location	Discipline	Level	Team
1	2022–23	5 March 2023	(Czech Republic) Nové Město	Mixed Relay	Biathlon World Cup	Jeanmonnot / Colombo / Perrot / Claude
2	2023–24	7 February 2024	(Czech Republic) Nové Město	Mixed Relay	World Championships	Perrot / Fillon Maillet / Braisaz / Simon
3	2024–25	1 December 2024	(Finland) Kontiolahti	Relay	Biathlon World Cup	Claude / Fillon Maillet / Perrot / Jacquelin
4	2024–25	15 December 2024	(Austria) Hochfilzen	Relay	Biathlon World Cup	Claude / Fillon Maillet / Perrot / Jacquelin
5	2025–26	30 November 2025	(Sweden) Östersund	Mixed Relay	Biathlon World Cup	Jacquelin / Perrot / Braisaz-Bouchet / Jeanmonnot
6	2025–26	15 January 2026	(Germany) Ruhpolding	Relay	Biathlon World Cup	Claude / Lombardot / Fillon Maillet / Perrot
7	2025–26	8 February 2026	(Italy) Antholz-Anterselva	Mixed Relay	Olympic Games	Perrot / Fillon Maillet / Jeanmonnot / Simon
8	2025–26	17 February 2026	(Italy) Antholz-Anterselva	Relay	Olympic Games	Claude / Jacquelin / Fillon Maillet / Perrot
