= Tero Seppälä =

Finnish biathlete (born 1996)

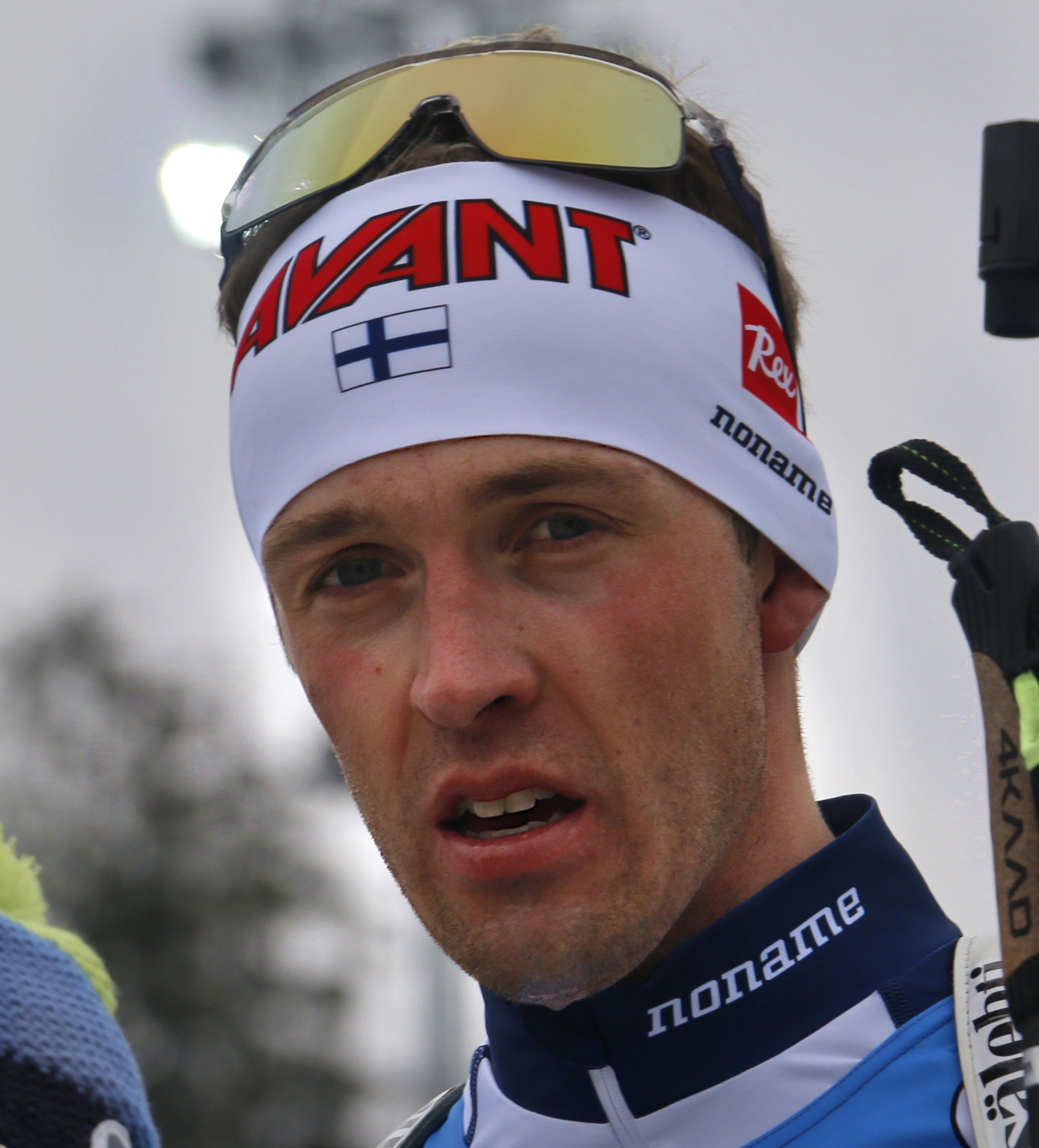
- Seppälä in 2023

Personal information
- Born: 25 January 1996 (age 30) Järvenpää, Finland
- Height: 6 ft 0 in (183 cm)
- Weight: 148 lb (67 kg)

Sport
- Country: Finland
- Sport: Biathlon
- Club: Haapajärven kiilat

Tero Seppälä (born 25 January 1996) is a Finnish biathlete who competes internationally.

Seppälä's best result in the Biathlon World Cup is 5th, which he achieved twice during the 2021–2022 season. The first time was in the pursuit in Östersund and the second time was in the sprint in Ruhpolding.

He participated in the 2018 Winter Olympics.

== Biathlon results ==
All results are sourced from the International Biathlon Union.

=== Olympic Games ===
0 medals

Event	Individual	Sprint	Pursuit	Mass start	Relay	Mixed relay
(South Korea) 2018 Pyeongchang	76th	20th	25th	21st	—	6th
(China) 2022 Beijing	23rd	25th	21st	9th	17th	11th
(Italy) 2026 Milano Cortina	51st	18th	15th	22nd	7th	6th

=== World Championships ===
0 medals

Event	Individual	Sprint	Pursuit	Mass start	Relay	Mixed relay	Single Mixed relay
(Austria) 2017 Hochfilzen	79th	71st	—	—	20th	—	—
(Sweden) 2019 Östersund	31st	35th	28th	—	17th	10th	12th
(Italy) 2020 Anterselva-Antholz	87th	52nd	47th	—	26th	9th	23rd
(Slovenia) 2021 Pokljuka	36th	27th	31st	—	19th	13th	—
(Germany) 2023 Oberhof	18th	47th	24th	10th	10th	—	—
(Czech Republic) 2024 Nové Město na Moravě	36th	31st	49th	—	8th	—	—
(Switzerland) 2025 Lenzerheide	31st	22nd	22nd	9th	10th	9th	10th

*During Olympic seasons, competitions are only held for those events not included in the Olympic program.
**The single mixed relay was added as an event in 2019.
