= 2013–14 Biathlon World Cup – Pursuit Women =

The 2013–14 Biathlon World Cup – Pursuit Women started at Friday December 9 in Hochfilzen and will finish Thursday March 21 in Holmenkollen. Defending titlist is Tora Berger of Norway.

== 2012-13 Top 3 Standings ==
Medal	Athlete	Points
Gold:	(Norway) Tora Berger	417
Silver:	(Germany) Andrea Henkel	279
Bronze:	(France) Marie Dorin Habert	277

== Medal winners ==
Event:	Gold:	Time	Silver:	Time	Bronze:	Time
Hochfilzen details	Synnøve Solemdal; Norway	30:16.2 (1+0+0+0))	Juliya Dzhyma; Ukraine	30:27.7 (0+0+0+0)	Krystyna Pałka; Poland	30:31.3 (0+0+0+0)
Annecy details	Valj Semerenko; Ukraine	28:05.4 (1+0+0+0)	Irina Starykh; Russia	28:09.6 (0+0+0+0)	Tiril Eckhoff; Norway	28:20.9 (0+0+1+0)
Oberhof details	Darya Domracheva; Belarus	33:35.8 (0+2+1+0)	Kaisa Mäkäräinen; Finland	34:10.4 (1+0+2+0)	Synnøve Solemdal; Norway	34:47.5 (0+1+1+0)
Ruhpolding details	Gabriela Soukalová; Czech Republic	30:39.8 (0+0+0+0)	Tora Berger; Norway	30:49.5 (1+0+0+0)	Kaisa Mäkäräinen; Finland	31:18.7 (2+0+0+1)
Antholz details	Andrea Henkel; Germany	31:04.5 (0+0+0+0)	Nadezhda Skardino; Belarus	31:06.1 (0+0+0+0)	Tora Berger; Norway	31:11.1 (1+0+2+0)
Pokljuka details	Kaisa Mäkäräinen; Finland	32:01.0 (0+0+1+1)	Tora Berger; Norway	32:20.7 (1+0+1+0)	Dorothea Wierer; Italy	32:55.5 (1+0+2+0)
Kontiolahti details	Kaisa Mäkäräinen; Finland	30:52.0 (1+0+1+0)	Darya Domracheva; Belarus	31:52.0 (0+0+0+1)	Olga Zaitseva; Russia	32:46.3 (4+0+0+1)
Holmenkollen details	Anastasiya Kuzmina; Slovakia	30:29.1 (1+0+1+0)	Tora Berger; Norway	31:10.9 (1+1+2+0)	Olga Vilukhina; Russia	31:23.1 (0+0+2+0)

== Standings ==
#	Name	HOC	ANN	OBE	RUH	ANT	POK	KON	HOL	Total
1	Kaisa Mäkäräinen (FIN)	27	26	54	48	32	60	60	43	350
2	Tora Berger (NOR)	23	3	43	54	48	54	40	54	319
3	Darya Domracheva (BLR)	30	—	60	29	40	43	54	40	296
4	Olga Vilukhina (RUS)	21	32	40	23	25	34	18	48	241
5	Tiril Eckhoff (NOR)	17	48	27	36	43	40	25	—	236
6	Valj Semerenko (UKR)	36	60	32	34	—	30	22	19	233
7	Veronika Vítková (CZE)	43	12	30	40	14	24	38	15	216
8	Andrea Henkel (GER)	12	9	25	27	60	38	7	29	207
9	Anastasiya Kuzmina (SVK)	25	24	—	14	34	16	31	60	204
10	Gabriela Soukalová (CZE)	32	43	29	60	—	—	12	27	203
11	Teja Gregorin (SLO)									187
12	Irina Starykh (RUS)		54							160
13	Selina Gasparin (SUI)									150
14	Franziska Preuß (GER)									148
15	Laura Dahlmeier (GER)									144
16	Olga Zaitseva (RUS)							48		141
17	Dorothea Wierer (ITA)						48			141
18	Susan Dunklee (USA)									136
19	Juliya Dzhyma (UKR)	54								131
20	Krystyna Pałka (POL)	48								131
21	Fanny Welle-Strand Horn (NOR)									129
22	Nadezhda Skardino (BLR)					54				128
23	Franziska Hildebrand (GER)									127
24	Vita Semerenko (UKR)									124
25	Weronika Nowakowska-Ziemniak (POL)									118
26	Yana Romanova (RUS)									117
27	Jana Gereková (SVK)									117
28	Anaïs Bescond (FRA)									114
29	Synnøve Solemdal (NOR)	60		48						108
30	Ann Kristin Flatland (NOR)									107
#	Name	HOC	ANN	OBE	RUH	ANT	POK	KON	HOL	Total
31	Rosanna Crawford (CAN)									106
32	Marie Dorin Habert (FRA)									93
33	Ekaterina Shumilova (RUS)									88
34	Olena Pidhrushna (UKR)									85
35	Magdalena Gwizdoń (POL)									85
36	Marie Laure Brunet (FRA)									81
37	Éva Tófalvi (ROU)									73
38	Karin Oberhofer (ITA)									69
39	Liudmila Kalinchik (BLR)									68
40	Elise Ringen (NOR)									67
41	Monika Hojnisz (POL)									66
42	Marte Olsbu (NOR)									63
43	Katharina Innerhofer (AUT)									58
44	Anaïs Chevalier (FRA)									58
45	Natalya Burdyga (UKR)									57
46	Zina Kocher (CAN)									53
47	Nicole Gontier (ITA)									48
48	Marine Bolliet (FRA)									47
49	Evi Sachenbacher-Stehle (GER)									46
50	Elisa Gasparin (SUI)									43
51	Vanessa Hinz (GER)									42
52	Daria Virolaynen (RUS)									40
53	Olga Podchufarova (RUS)									40
54	Anna-Karin Strömstedt (SWE)									38
55	Fuyuko Suzuki (JPN)									34
56	Chaoqing Song (CHN)									31
57	Laure Soulie (AND)									31
58	Nastassia Dubarezava (BLR)									24
59	Andreja Mali (SLO)									22
60	Eva Puskarčíková (CZE)									22
#	Name	HOC	ANN	OBE	RUH	ANT	POK	KON	HOL	Total
61	Ekaterina Glazyrina (RUS)									20
62	Sophie Boilley (FRA)									20
63	Mari Laukkanen (FIN)									19
64	Michela Ponza (ITA)									18
65	Bente Landheim (NOR)									18
66	Elisabeth Högberg (SWE)									17
67	Nadine Horchler (GER)									12
68	Irene Cadurisch (SUI)									12
69	Galina Nechkasova (RUS)									12
70	Réka Ferencz (ROU)									11
71	Megan Heinicke (CAN)									8
72	Paulina Bobak (POL)									7
73	Yan Zhang (CHN)									6
74	Lisa Theresa Hauser (AUT)									5
75	Sara Studebaker (USA)									4
76	Jitka Landová (CZE)									4
77	Nazdeya Pisareva (BLR)									3
78	Aita Gasparin (SUI)									3
79	Megan Imrie (CAN)									2
80	Ekaterina Iourieva (RUS)									2
81	Jialin Tang (CHN)									2
82	Galina Vishnevskaya (KAZ)									2
83	Victoria Padial (ESP)									1
