= 2013–14 Biathlon World Cup – Sprint Women =

The 2013–14 Biathlon World Cup – Sprint Women started on Friday November 29 in Östersund and finished Thursday March 20 in Holmenkollen. Defending titlist is Tora Berger of Norway.

== Competition format ==
The 7.5 kilometres sprint race is the third oldest biathlon event; the distance is skied over three laps. The biathlete shoots two times at any shooting lane, first prone, then standing, totalling 10 targets. For each missed target the biathlete has to complete a penalty lap of around 150 metres. Competitors' starts are staggered, normally by 30 seconds.

== 2012–13 Top 3 Standings ==
Medal	Athlete	Points
Gold:	(Norway) Tora Berger	428
Silver:	(Belarus) Darya Domracheva	351
Bronze:	(Germany) Miriam Gössner	337

== Medal winners ==
Event:	Gold:	Time	Silver:	Time	Bronze:	Time
Östersund details	Ann Kristin Flatland; Norway	20:41.2 (0+0)	Olga Zaitseva; Russia	20:57.1 (0+0)	Tora Berger; Norway	21:03.2 (1+0)
Hochfilzen details	Selina Gasparin; Switzerland	23:16.9 (0+1)	Veronika Vítková; Czech Republic	23:18.1 (0+0)	Irina Starykh; Russia	23:19.0 (0+0)
Annecy details	Selina Gasparin; Switzerland	20:51.4 (0+0)	Kaisa Mäkäräinen; Finland	20:59.7 (0+1)	Valj Semerenko; Ukraine	21:02.9 (0+1)
Oberhof details	Darya Domracheva; Belarus	23:06.7 (0+1)	Kaisa Mäkäräinen; Finland	23:36.5 (0+2)	Olena Pidhrushna; Ukraine	23:43.1 (0+0)
Antholz details	Anais Bescond; France	20:30.2 (0+1)	Andrea Henkel; Germany	20:36.9 (0+0)	Darya Domracheva; Belarus	20:40.3 (0+2)
Pokljuka details	Katharina Innerhofer; Austria	21:19.1 (0+0)	Daria Virolaynen; Russia	21:28.3 (0+0)	Nadezhda Skardino; Belarus	21:31.2 (0+0)
Kontiolahti details	Kaisa Mäkäräinen; Finland	20:36.3 (0+1)	Olga Zaitseva; Russia	20:42.4 (0+0)	Mari Laukkanen; Finland	20:59.0 (0+0)
Kontiolahti details	Kaisa Mäkäräinen; Finland	20:53.6 (1+0)	Tora Berger; Norway	20:59.8 (0+0)	Gabriela Soukalová; Czech Republic	21:06.5 (0+0)
Holmenkollen details	Darya Domracheva; Belarus	22:18.8 (0+1)	Tora Berger; Norway	22:29.5 (0+0)	Susan Dunklee; United States	22:51.8 (0+0)

== Standings ==
#	Name	ÖST	HOC	ANN	OBE	ANT	POK	KON	KON	HOL	Total
1	Kaisa Mäkäräinen (FIN)	21	25	54	54	32	43	60	60	18	367
2	Tora Berger (NOR)	48	43	0	43	38	38	43	54	54	361
3	Darya Domracheva (BLR)	43	5	—	60	48	13	4	21	60	254
4	Olga Vilukhina (RUS)	—	8	40	26	31	27	40	31	43	246
5	Gabriela Soukalová (CZE)	38	18	43	15	DSQ	—	36	48	40	238
6	Selina Gasparin (SUI)	22	60	60	7	22	8	0	40	14	233
7	Veronika Vítková (CZE)	30	54	24	28	7	—	38	30	0	211
8	Olga Zaitseva (RUS)	54	34	10	—	—	9	54	38	12	202
9	Tiril Eckhoff (NOR)	5	0	30	31						187
10	Valj Semerenko (UKR)	20	19	48	38						186
11	Andrea Henkel (GER)	28	0	28	4	54					183
12	Anastasiya Kuzmina (SVK)	6	28	25	—						179
13	Susan Dunklee (USA)	25	0	0	9					48	174
14	Anaïs Bescond (FRA)	31	27	20	—	60					171
15	Ann Kristin Flatland (NOR)	60	0	—	40						164
16	Irina Starykh (RUS)	40	48	29	21						162
17	Nadezhda Skardino (BLR)	15	13	0	—		48				161
18	Rosanna Crawford (CAN)	0	24	15	—						146
19	Dorothea Wierer (ITA)	0	3	9	32						143
20	Olena Pidhrushna (UKR)	29	31	34	48						142
21	Franziska Hildebrand (GER)	18	10	38	23						140
22	Franziska Preuß (GER)	14	21	38	0						139
23	Mari Laukkanen (FIN)	0	0	4	5			48			138
24	Laura Dahlmeier (GER)	10	26	31	—						137
25	Teja Gregorin (SLO)	0	22	18	—						137
26	Jana Gereková (SVK)	32	20	12	—						135
27	Yana Romanova (RUS)	8	—	13	30						132
28	Fanny Welle-Strand Horn (NOR)	—	12	19	0						131
29	Juliya Dzhyma (UKR)	27	40	26	0						127
30	Vita Semerenko (UKR)	0	17	27	24						124
#	Name	ÖST	HOC	ANN	OBE	ANT	POK	KON	KON	HOL	Total
31	Magdalena Gwizdoń (POL)	0	0	0	25						120
32	Krystyna Pałka (POL)	7	30	32	18						115
33	Weronika Nowakowska-Ziemniak (POL)	0	32	—	34						112
34	Katharina Innerhofer (AUT)	0	0	0	8		60				108
35	Synnøve Solemdal (NOR)	34	38	—	20						104
36	Andreja Mali (SLO)	0	15	21	0						98
37	Ekaterina Shumilova (RUS)	24	29	—	3						84
38	Marie Laure Brunet (FRA)	26	36	0	—						82
39	Anna-Karin Strömstedt (SWE)	0	—	0	10						80
40	Elise Ringen (NOR)	23	23	—	19						80
41	Zina Kocher (CAN)	0	16	0	—						77
42	Karin Oberhofer (ITA)	0	0	17	0						76
43	Marie Dorin Habert (FRA)										75
44	Natalya Burdyga (UKR)	11	0	22	14						75
45	Liudmila Kalinchik (BLR)	0	0	0	16						67
46	Daria Virolaynen (RUS)	—	—	—	—	—	54				64
47	Anais Chevalier (FRA)	—	14	0	27						58
48	Nicole Gontier (ITA)										58
49	Marine Bolliet (FRA)	0	7	0	29						57
50	Evi Sachenbacher-Stehle (GER)	16	0	3	36						55
51	Monika Hojnisz (POL)	3	0	—	0						53
52	Paulína Fialková (SVK)	0	0	—	—	0	—	31	0	17	48
53	Marte Olsbu (NOR)										47
54	Mariya Panfilova (UKR)	0	0	7	0						45
55	Ekaterina Iourieva (RUS)	36	0	—	2						38
56	Nastassia Dubarezava (BLR)	0	0	0	17						38
57	Éva Tófalvi (ROU)	1	0	0	0						35
58	Darya Usanova (KAZ)	0	9	—	—						33
59	Sophie Boilley (FRA)	17	0	6	0						33
60	Olga Podchufarova (RUS)										30
#	Name	ÖST	HOC	ANN	OBE	ANT	POK	KON	KON	HOL	Total
61	Megan Heinicke (CAN)										26
62	Megan Imrie (CAN)	19	6	1	—						26
63	Reka Ferencz (ROU)	0	0	23	0						23
64	Elisa Gasparin (SUI)	0	0	0	22						22
65	Irene Cadurisch (SUI)										22
66	Jitka Landová (CZE)										22
67	Nadzeya Pisareva (BLR)	—	—	—	13						22
68	Victoria Padial (ESP)	0	0	0	0	0	21	0	0	0	21
69	Vanessa Hinz (GER)										21
70	Michela Ponza (UKR)	0	0	11	—						21
71	Eva Puskarčíková (CZE)	—	3	16	1						20
72	Desislava Stoyanova (BUL)	0	0	14	6						20
73	Žanna Juškāne (LAT)										17
74	Laure Soulie (AND)	4	11	0	0						15
75	Hannah Dreissigacker (USA)										13
76	Elisabeth Högberg (SWE)	13	0	0	—						13
77	Nadine Horchler (GER)	—	—	—	12						12
78	Diana Rasimovičiūtė (LTU)	12	0	0	0						12
79	Lisa Theresa Hauser (AUT)	—	—	8	—						12
80	Chaoqing Song (CHN)										11
81	Natalija Kocergina (LTU)	0	0	0	11						11
82	Emma Lunder (CAN)										11
83	Bente Landheim (NOR)										9
84	Ekaterina Yurlova (RUS)	9	—	—	—						9
85	Yan Zhang (CHN)										7
86	Sara Studebaker (USA)										6
87	Galina Vishnevskaya (KAZ)	—	0	5	—						5
88	Luminita Piscoran (ROU)	0	4	0	0						4
89	Olga Abramova (UKR)										3
90	Inna Suprun (UKR)	2	—	—	—						2
91	Daria Yurlova (EST)	2	—	—	—						2
92	Fuyuko Suzuki (JPN)	—	1	0	0						1
93	Valentina Nazarova (RUS)										1
