= 2013–14 Biathlon World Cup – Pursuit Men =

The 2013–14 Biathlon World Cup – Pursuit Men will start at December 9, 2013 in Hochfilzen and will finish March 22, 2014 in Holmenkollen. Defending titlist is Martin Fourcade of France.

== Competition format ==
This is a pursuit competition. The biathletes' starts are separated by their time differences from a previous race, most commonly a sprint race. The contestants ski a distance of 12.5 kilometres (7.8 mi) over five laps. On four of the laps, the contestants shoot at targets; each miss requires the contestant to ski a penalty loop of 150 metres (490 ft). There are two prone shooting bouts and two standing bouts, in that order. The contestant crossing the finish line first is the winner.

To prevent awkward and/or dangerous crowding of the skiing loops, and overcapacity at the shooting range, World Cup Pursuits are held with only the 60 top ranking biathletes after the preceding race. The biathletes shoot (on a first-come, first-served basis) at the lane corresponding to the position they arrived for all shooting bouts.

Points are awarded for each event, according to each contestant's finish. When all events are completed. the contestant with the highest number of points is declared the season winner.

== 2012-13 Top 3 Standings ==
Medal	Athlete	Points
Gold:	(France) Martin Fourcade	388
Silver:	(Norway) Emil Hegle Svendsen	287
Bronze:	(Russia) Anton Shipulin	247

== Medal winners ==
Event:	Gold:	Time	Silver:	Time	Bronze:	Time
Hochfilzen details	Martin Fourcade; France	32.43.3 (0+0+1+0)	Emil Hegle Svendsen; Norway	32.51.0 (0+0+1+0)	Tarjei Bø; Norway	33.00.9 (1+0+1+0)
Annecy details	Johannes Thingnes Bø; Norway	31:43.7 (0+1+0+0)	Erik Lesser; Germany	32:21.2 (0+0+0+0)	Anton Shipulin; Russia	32:22.8 (0+0+1+0)
Oberhof details	Emil Hegle Svendsen; Norway	34:47.7 (1+0+0+0)	Ole Einar Bjørndalen; Norway	35:23.3 (0+0+0+2)	Martin Fourcade; France	35:47.7 (0+0+1+1)
Ruhpolding details	Emil Hegle Svendsen; Norway	32:38.2 (0+0+0+0)	Jakov Fak; Slovenia	32:56.2 (0+0+0+0)	Evgeniy Garanichev; Russia	32:59.6 (1+0+0+0)
Antholz details	Simon Schempp; Germany	31:20.6 (1+0+1+0)	Jean-Guillaume Béatrix; France	31:22.1 (0+0+0+1)	Henrik L'Abée-Lund; Norway	31:25.4 (0+0+2+0)
Pokljuka details	Anton Shipulin; Russia	31:02.8 (1+0+0+0)	Björn Ferry; Sweden	31:11.4 (1+1+0+0)	Ole Einar Bjørndalen; Norway	31:30.2 (0+1+0+1)
Kontiolahti details	Johannes Thingnes Bø; Norway	33:37.1 (0+0+1+4)	Martin Fourcade; France	33:53.4 (0+0+2+1)	Björn Ferry; Sweden	33:57.5 (0+0+1+2)
Holmenkollen details	Simon Eder; Austria	32:23.4 (0+0+0+0)	Alexander Loginov; Russia	32:36.1 (0+0+0+1)	Björn Ferry; Sweden	32:44.1 (0+0+0+1)

== Standings ==
#	Name	HOC	ANN	OBE	RUH	ANT	POK	KON	HOL	Total
1	Martin Fourcade (FRA)	60	24	48	—	32	36	54	40	294
2	Simon Eder (AUT)	18	28	18	43	20	34	14	60	235
3	Anton Shipulin (RUS)	24	48	36	15	—	60	26	25	234
4	Björn Ferry (SWE)	5	21	—	19	38	54	48	48	233
5	Johannes Thingnes Bø (NOR)	—	60	38	23	—	14	60	29	224
6	Simon Schempp (GER)	38	22	19	30	60	—	32	17	218
7	Emil Hegle Svendsen (NOR)	54	—	60	60	—	21	0	21	216
8	Dominik Landertinger (AUT)	2	19	32	36	34	40	34	8	205
9	Ole Einar Bjørndalen (NOR)	40	—	54	—	43	48	—	9	194
10	Jakov Fak (SLO)	25	—	—	54	24	38	16	34	191
11	Andrejs Rastorgujevs (LAT)	32	10	43	22	—	32	38	14	191
12	Arnd Peiffer (GER)	30	0	29	3	40	22	29	36	189
13	Dmitry Malyshko (RUS)	29	27	26	32	—	43	22	—	179
14	Lowell Bailey (USA)	11	26	—	20	29	31	27	27	171
15	Jean-Guillaume Béatrix (FRA)	31	7	22	—	54	19	8	19	160
16	Alexander Loginov (RUS)	—	38	16	27	—	—	17	54	152
17	Christoph Sumann (AUT)	36	17	—	34	12	—	30	18	147
18	Evgeniy Garanichev (RUS)	7	32	0	48	16	0	11	32	146
19	Fredrik Lindström (SWE)	13	23	—	21	3	29	28	28	145
20	Evgeny Ustyugov (RUS)	43	—	31	28	—	27	10	0	139
21	Alexey Volkov (RUS)	22	18	23	24	—	12	—	38	137
22	Tarjei Bø (NOR)	48	—	28	38	—	18	—	—	132
23	Ondřej Moravec (CZE)	0	29	27	26	28	7	0	12	129
24	Nathan Smith (CAN)	14	34	—	25	15	5	31	0	124
25	Daniel Böhm (GER)	28	—	21	18	8	25	—	23	123
26	Lukas Hofer (ITA)	—	31	3	0	21	20	25	22	122
27	Simon Desthieux (FRA)	12	15	24	10	19	8	23	6	117
28	Carl Johan Bergman (SWE)	0	43	—	—	—	9	12	43	107
29	Tim Burke (USA)	20	25	—	7	—	28	24	—	104
30	Jaroslav Soukup (CZE)	1	0	11	29	—	30	0	31	102
#	Name	HOC	ANN	OBE	RUH	ANT	POK	KON	HOL	Total
31	Erik Lesser (GER)	—	54	—	12	25	—	4	3	98
32	Benjamin Weger (SUI)	15	40	34	0	5	—	0	2	96
33	Andreas Birnbacher (GER)	26	14	25	17	14	—	—	—	96
34	Simon Fourcade (FRA)	—	—	20	40	31	0	—	—	91
35	Alexis Bœuf (FRA)	34	11	14	31	—	—	—	—	90
36	Serhiy Semenov (UKR)	23	0	0	16	—	11	9	30	89
37	Krasimir Anev (BUL)	6	—	—	0	36	24	20	—	86
38	Lars Berger (NOR)	27	20	—	—	—	—	18	20	85
39	Daniel Mesotitsch (AUT)	8	30	—	5	4	6	15	16	84
40	Klemen Bauer (SLO)	—	3	17	0	—	23	40	—	83
41	Henrik L'Abée-Lund (NOR)	4	12	12	4	48	—	—	—	80
42	Lars Helge Birkeland (NOR)	—	—	—	—	—	—	43	26	69
43	Christoph Stephan (GER)	—	36	30	—	—	—	—	1	67
44	Friedrich Pinter (AUT)	—	16	—	—	13	26	0	4	59
45	Brendan Green (CAN)	0	—	—	—	23	15	21	0	59
46	Dominik Windisch (ITA)	16	0	—	—	—	17	13	11	57
47	Michal Šlesingr (CZE)	—	—	40	14	—	—	—	—	54
48	Quentin Fillon Maillet (FRA)	—	4	0	0	27	—	0	15	46
49	Dmytro Pidruchnyi (UKR)	17	—	10	—	—	16	1	—	44
50	Benedikt Döll (GER)	—	—	—	—	—	3	36	0	39
51	Julian Eberhard (AUT)	—	—	6	—	—	0	6	24	36
52	Andriy Deryzemlya (UKR)	19	9	7	0	—	—	—	—	35
53	Erlend Bjøntegaard (NOR)	—	1	—	—	22	—	—	10	33
54	Tomas Kaukėnas (LTU)	—	—	—	0	—	13	19	0	32
55	Timofey Lapshin (RUS)	—	—	—	—	30	—	—	—	30
56	Florian Graf (GER)	21	0	—	—	—	1	2	5	29
57	Vladimir Iliev (BUL)	0	0	—	—	26	0	0	0	26
58	Jean-Philippe Leguellec (CAN)	9	8	—	9	—	—	—	—	26
59	Vladimir Chepelin (BLR)	—	—	15	2	—	2	5	0	24
60	Alexander Os (NOR)	—	6	—	—	17	—	—	—	23
#	Name	HOC	ANN	OBE	RUH	ANT	POK	KON	HOL	Total
61	Andrei Makoveev (RUS)	—	—	—	—	18	—	—	—	18
62	Evgeny Abramenko (BLR)	—	5	0	13	—	—	—	—	18
63	Leif Nordgren (USA)	—	—	0	0	—	10	7	—	17
64	Velte Sjastad Christiansen (NOR)	10	—	5	—	—	—	—	0	15
65	Tobias Eberhard (AUT)	0	—	13	—	0	—	—	—	13
66	David Komatz (AUT)	—	—	0	—	—	—	—	13	13
67	Ivan Tcherezov (RUS)	—	13	—	—	—	—	—	—	13
68	Alexey Slepov (RUS)	—	—	—	—	6	—	—	7	13
69	Christian De Lorenzi (ITA)	0	0	—	11	0	—	—	—	11
70	Jarkko Kauppinen (FIN)	—	0	—	—	11	—	—	—	11
71	Yan Savitksiy (KAZ)	0	—	—	0	10	—	—	—	10
72	Markus Windisch (ITA)	—	0	0	1	9	—	—	—	10
73	Artem Pryma (UKR)	—	0	9	—	—	0	0	0	9
74	Tobias Arwidson (SWE)	—	0	—	8	—	—	—	—	8
75	Magnus Jonsson (SWE)	—	—	8	—	—	—	—	—	8
76	Martin Eng (NOR)	—	—	—	—	7	—	—	—	7
77	Scott Perras (CAN)	—	0	—	6	—	—	—	—	6
78	Matej Kazar (SVK)	—	2	—	—	—	—	0	3	5
79	Tomáš Hasilla (SVK)	0	0	0	—	—	4	—	0	4
80	Sven Grossegger (AUT)	—	—	4	—	—	—	—	—	4
81	Simon Hallenbarter (SUI)	3	0	—	—	—	—	—	—	3
82	Aliaksandr Darozhka (BLR)	—	—	2	—	0	0	—	—	2
83	Vitaliy Kilchytskyy (UKR)	—	—	—	—	2	—	—	—	2
84	Serguei Sednev (UKR)	—	—	1	0	—	—	—	—	1
85	Anton Pantov (KAZ)	—	—	—	0	1	—	—	—	1
