= 2013–14 Biathlon World Cup – Sprint Men =

The 2013–14 Biathlon World Cup – Sprint Men started on Friday November 29 in Östersund and finished Thursday March 20 in Holmenkollen. Defending titlist is Martin Fourcade of France.

== Competition format ==
The 7.5 kilometres sprint race is the third oldest biathlon event; the distance is skied over three laps. The biathlete shoots two times at any shooting lane, first prone, then standing, totalling 10 targets. For each missed target the biathlete has to complete a penalty lap of around 150 metres. Competitors' starts are staggered, normally by 30 seconds.

== 2012–13 Top 3 Standings ==
Medal	Athlete	Points
Gold:	(France) Martin Fourcade	484
Silver:	(Norway) Emil Hegle Svendsen	315
Bronze:	(Russia) Evgeny Ustyugov	313

== Medal winners ==
Event:	Gold:	Time	Silver:	Time	Bronze:	Time
Östersund details	Martin Fourcade; France	25:56.0 (0+1)	Fredrik Lindström; Sweden	26:02.5 (0+0)	Tim Burke; United States	26:27.3 (0+0)
Hochfilzen details	Lars Berger; Norway	25:02.0 (0+2)	Martin Fourcade; France	25:15.6 (0+0)	Ole Einar Bjørndalen; Norway	25:17.3 (0+1)
Annecy details	Johannes Thingnes Bø; Norway	22:06.7 (0+0)	Ondřej Moravec; Czech Republic	22:39.6 (0+0)	Martin Fourcade; France	22:43.8 (0+1)
Oberhof details	Emil Hegle Svendsen; Norway	26:44.3 (2+0)	Ole Einar Bjørndalen; Norway	26:44.7 (1+1)	Martin Fourcade; France	27:06.0 (0+3)
Antholz details	Simon Schempp; Germany; Lukas Hofer; Italy	24:44.9 (0+0); 24:44.9 (0+1)			Arnd Peiffer; Germany	24:49.2 (0+0)
Pokljuka details	Björn Ferry; Sweden	25:03.5 (0+1)	Anton Shipulin; Russia	25:05.0 (0+0)	Arnd Peiffer; Germany	25:06.2 (0+1)
Kontiolahti details	Johannes Thingnes Bø; Norway	23:33.2 (0+0)	Martin Fourcade; France	23:40.3 (0+0)	Arnd Peiffer; Germany	23:40.4 (1+0)
Kontiolahti details	Johannes Thingnes Bø; Norway	24:03.5 (0+0)	Alexandr Loginov; Russia	24:22.0 (0+0)	Lowell Bailey; United States	24:22.9 (0+0)
Holmenkollen details	Jakov Fak; Slovenia	26:05.9 (0+1)	Evgeniy Garanichev; Russia	26:19.8 (0+0)	Björn Ferry; Sweden	26:20.2 (0+0)

== Standings ==
#	Name	ÖST	HOC	ANN	OBE	ANT	POK	KON	KON	HOL	Total
1	Martin Fourcade (FRA)	60	54	48	48	40	36	54	30	30	400
2	Arnd Peiffer (GER)	40	30	1	34	48	48	48	16	21	286
3	Johannes Thingnes Bø (NOR)	32	—	60	31	—	11	60	60	23	277
4	Ole Einar Bjørndalen (NOR)	29	48	—	54	21	38	40	1	29	260
5	Dominik Landertinger (AUT)	31	14	27	32	43	40	19	26	18	250
6	Emil Hegle Svendsen (NOR)	30	36	—	60	—	8	34	38	31	237
7	Anton Shipulin (RUS)	20	27	31	28	27	54	29	8	8	232
8	Lukas Hofer (ITA)	24	0	36	10	60	34	22	36	5	227
9	Simon Eder (AUT)	34	23	20	27	8	21	25	28	38	224
10	Dmitry Malyshko (RUS)	17	26	43	16	—	43	43	32	0	220
11	Simon Schempp (GER)	0	34	40	16	60	—	31	20	10	211
12	Jean-Guillaume Béatrix (FRA)	43	22	5	1	36	31	26	18	27	209
13	Björn Ferry (SWE)	1	2	12	—	38	60	17	25	48	203
14	Ondřej Moravec (CZE)	4	0	54	12	24	15	38	43	13	203
15	Fredrik Lindström (SWE)	54	20	34	—	0	27	36	12	9	192
16	Lowell Bailey (USA)	27	25	6	—	22	29	12	48	22	191
17	Jakov Fak (SLO)	13	19	—	—	30	26	16	24	60	188
18	Lars Berger (NOR)	—	60	29	—	—	—	23	15	36	163
19	Evgeny Ustyugov (RUS)	38	24	—	43	—	28	18	3	0	154
20	Alexandr Loginov (RUS)	0	0	24	22	0	0	2	54	43	154
21	Andrejs Rastorgujevs (LAT)	0	15	8	13	—	32	30	0	40	138
22	Serhiy Semenov (UKR)	14	32	0	24	—	9	21	10	26	136
23	Tim Burke (USA)	48	17	13	0	0	25	6	22	0	131
24	Simon Desthieux (FRA)	23	16	11	20	2	0	0	23	36	131
25	Erik Lesser (GER)	36	0	32	—	23	—	28	0	0	119
26	Evgeniy Garanichev (RUS)	—	18	18	0	12	0	5	9	54	116
27	Klemen Bauer (SLO)	19	0	0	19	0	24	24	29	0	115
28	Friedrich Pinter (AUT)	0	0	26	—	28	30	8	17	1	110
29	Florian Graf (GER)	21	29	23	—	—	4	13	5	14	109
30	Daniel Böhm (GER)	26	31	—	17	0	16	—	—	17	107
#	Name	ÖST	HOC	ANN	OBE	RUH	ANT	POK	KON	HOL	Total
31	Christoph Sumann (AUT)	—	40	22	—	4	—	14	0	20	100
32	Nathan Smith (CAN)	0	0	25	0	19	0	20	34	0	98
33	Daniel Mesotitsch (AUT)	0	22	38	—	0	0	0	21	15	96
34	Christoph Stephan (GER)	25	—	19	23	29	—	—	—	0	96
35	Brendan Green (CAN)	—	10	—	—	34	20	15	13	0	92
36	Jaroslav Soukup (CZE)	15	11	0	0	0	22	10	0	32	90
37	Carl Johan Bergman (SWE)	2	0	14	—	—	0	9	40	24	89
38	Alexey Volkov (RUS)	0	8	16	36	—	10	—	—	17	87
39	Benjamin Weger (SUI)	0	0	30	30	0	—	27	0	0	87
40	Tarjei Bø (NOR)	11	43	—	9	—	12	—	—	—	75
41	Dominik Windisch (ITA)	0	12	0	0	—	17	7	27	11	74
42	Henrik L'Abée-Lund (NOR)	0	9	28	0	31	3	—	—	—	71
43	Krasimir Anev (BUL)	0	0	0	—	32	23	0	11	0	66
44	Benedikt Doll (GER)	—	—	—	—	—	0	32	19	12	63
45	Dmytro Pidruchnyi (UKR)	—	38	—	0	—	20	0	0	0	58
46	Alexis Bœuf (FRA)	8	13	21	14	0	—	—	—	—	56
47	Artem Pryma (UKR)	5	0	7	40	—	2	0	0	0	54
48	Lars Helge Birkeland (NOR)	—	—	0	—	14	—	0	31	7	52
49	Andriy Deryzemlya (UKR)	22	5	0	0	—	6	4	7	0	44
50	Quentin Fillon Maillet (FRA)	—	—	0	0	9	0	1	2	28	40
51	Simon Fourcade (FRA)	6	0	0	7	26	0	—	0	—	39
52	Kauri Koiv (EST)	0	0	—	38	0	—	—	—	0	38
53	Vetle Sjåstad Christiansen (NOR)	12	0	—	26	—	0	—	—	0	38
54	Matej Kazar (SVK)	0	0	15	—	0	13	3	0	0	31
55	Michal Šlesingr (CZE)	—	—	—	29	0	—	—	—	—	29
56	Andreas Birnbacher (GER)	—	8	0	21	0	—	—	—	—	29
57	Jean-Philippe Leguellec (CAN)	0	28	0	—	—	—	—	—	—	28
58	Baptiste Jouty (FRA)	28	0	—	—	—	—	—	—	—	28
59	Tomas Kaukėnas (LTU)	0	0	—	0	—	18	0	6	4	28
60	Magnus Jonsson (SWE)	0	—	—	25	0	—	—	—	—	25
#	Name	ÖST	HOC	ANN	OBE	RUH	ANT	POK	KON	HOL	Total
61	David Komatz (AUT)	—	—	—	0	—	0	—	—	25	25
62	Timofey Lapshin (RUS)	—	—	—	—	25	—	0	0	0	25
63	Pavol Hurajt (SVK)	18	0	4	—	0	—	—	—	—	22
64	Tomas Krupcik (CZE)	3	0	—	2	16	—	—	—	—	21
65	Jarkko Kauppinen (FIN)	0	0	0	0	20	—	0	0	—	20
66	Alexey Slepov (RUS)	—	—	—	—	1	—	—	—	19	20
67	Janez Marič (SLO)	0	0	0	18	0	0	—	—	—	18
68	Yan Savitskiy (KAZ)	0	0	0	—	18	—	—	—	—	18
69	Erlend Bjøntegaard (NOR)	—	—	0	—	17	—	—	—	0	17
70	Michal Krčmář (CZE)	—	0	17	0	0	0	0	0	0	17
71	Vladimir Iliev (BUL)	0	1	0	—	13	0	0	0	3	17
72	Scott Perras (CAN)	7	—	10	—	0	—	—	—	—	17
73	Ivan Tcherezov (RUS)	16	—	0	—	—	—	—	—	—	16
74	Vladimir Chepelin (BLR)	0	0	0	11	0	1	0	4	0	16
75	Tomáš Hasilla (SVK)	0	0	9	0	—	7	0	0	0	16
76	Alexander Os (NOR)	—	—	0	—	15	—	—	—	—	15
77	Leif Nordgren (USA)	0	—	0	0	—	0	0	14	0	14
78	Aleksiandr Darozhka (BLR)	—	—	—	0	0	14	0	—	0	14
79	Tobias Arwidson (SWE)	—	—	2	—	11	0	0	—	—	13
80	Tobias Eberhard (AUT)	0	4	0	6	3	—	—	—	—	13
81	Serafin Wiestner (SUI)	—	—	—	0	—	—	12	0	0	13
82	Sergey Novikov (RUS)	0	0	—	0	10	0	—	0	—	10
83	Milanko Petrović (SRB)	10	0	—	0	0	—	—	—	—	10
84	Maxim Tsvetkov (RUS)	9	—	—	—	—	—	—	—	—	9
85	Serguei Sednev (UKR)	0	0	0	8	—	0	—	0	—	8
86	Markus Windisch (ITA)	—	0	0	3	5	0	—	—	—	8
87	Christian Martinelli (ITA)	—	—	0	—	7	—	—	—	—	7
88	Julian Eberhard (AUT)	0	—	—	0	—	5	0	0	2	7
89	Scott Gow (CAN)	—	—	—	—	—	—	0	0	6	6
90	Claudio Böckli (SUI)	0	6	0	—	0	0	0	0	—	6
#	Name	ÖST	HOC	ANN	OBE	RUH	ANT	POK	KON	HOL	Total
91	Vitaliy Kilchytskyy (UKR)	—	—	—	—	6	—	—	—	—	6
92	Simon Hallenbarter (SUI)	—	3	3	0	0	—	—	—	0	6
93	Mario Dolder (SUI)	—	—	—	5	—	0	0	0	0	5
94	Danil Steptsenko (EST)	0	—	0	4	—	—	—	—	0	4
