= 2013–14 Biathlon World Cup – Mass start Women =

The 2013–14 Biathlon World Cup – Mass start Women started on Sunday January 5 in Oberhof and finished on Sunday March 23 in Holmenkollen. Defending titlist was Tora Berger of Norway.

== 2012-13 Top 3 Standings ==
Medal	Athlete	Points
Gold:	(Norway) Tora Berger	262
Silver:	(Belarus) Darya Domracheva	200
Bronze:	(Ukraine) Vita Semerenko	185

== Medal winners ==
Event:	Gold:	Time	Silver:	Time	Bronze:	Time
Oberhof details	Tora Berger; Norway	37:59.0 (1+0+0+0)	Synnøve Solemdal; Norway	38:16.5 (0+0+0+0)	Darya Domracheva; Belarus	38:16.8 (0+0+1+1)
Pokljuka details	Darya Domracheva; Belarus	36:16.4 (0+1+0+1)	Kaisa Mäkäräinen; Finland	36:38.6 (0+1+1+0)	Olga Zaitseva; Russia	36:52.3 (0+0+1+0)
Holmenkollen details	Anastasiya Kuzmina; Slovakia	39:44.8 (1+2+1+0)	Teja Gregorin; Slovenia	39:48.6 (0+0+1+1)	Marie Dorin Habert; France	39:53.1 (1+2+0+0)

== Standings ==
#	Name	OBE	POK	HOL	Total
1	Darya Domracheva (BLR)	48	60	43	151
2	Anastasiya Kuzmina (SVK)	36	43	60	139
3	Kaisa Mäkäräinen (FIN)	40	54	36	130
4	Tora Berger (NOR)	60	34	27	121
5	Olga Vilukhina (RUS)	32	38	32	102
6	Andrea Henkel (GER)	43	29	28	100
7	Olga Zaitseva (RUS)	—	48	40	88
8	Tiril Eckhoff (NOR)	29	40	18	87
9	Juliya Dzhyma (UKR)	34	32	17	83
10	Selina Gasparin (SUI)	24	25	30	79
11	Krystyna Pałka (POL)	38	19	19	76
12	Veronika Vítková (CZE)	17	30	29	76
13	Valj Semerenko (UKR)	26	27	22	75
14	Laura Dahlmeier (GER)	22	13	38	73
15	Franziska Hildebrand (GER)	31	26	16	73
16	Teja Gregorin (SLO)	—	18	54	72
17	Franziska Preuß (GER)	20	20	25	65
18	Anaïs Bescond (FRA)	11	21	31	63
19	Yana Romanova (RUS)	23	23	14	60
20	Weronika Nowakowska-Ziemniak (POL)	12	28	15	55
21	Dorothea Wierer (ITA)	18	24	13	55
22	Synnøve Solemdal (NOR)	54	—	—	54
23	Gabriela Soukalová (CZE)	28	—	24	52
24	Marie Dorin Habert (FRA)	—	—	48	48
25	Rosanna Crawford (CAN)	—	11	34	45
26	Natalya Burdyga (UKR)	30	14	—	44
27	Fanny Welle-Strand Horn (NOR)	—	22	21	43
28	Ann Kristin Flatland (NOR)	16	—	26	42
29	Nadezhda Skardino (BLR)	—	36	—	36
30	Liudmila Kalinchik (BLR)	—	31	—	31
#	Name	OBE	POK	HOL	Total
31	Olena Pidhrushna (UKR)	27	—	—	27
32	Elise Ringen (NOR)	25	—	—	25
33	Susan Dunklee (USA)	—	—	23	23
34	Elisa Gasparin (SUI)	21	—	—	21
35	Zina Kocher (CAN)	—	—	20	20
36	Evi Sachenbacher-Stehle (GER)	19	—	—	19
37	Katharina Innerhofer (AUT)	—	17	—	17
38	Magdalena Gwizdoń (POL)	—	16	—	16
39	Daria Virolaynen (RUS)	—	15	—	15
39	Ekaterina Shumilova (RUS)	15	—	—	15
41	Irina Starykh (RUS)	14	—	—	14
42	Marine Bolliet (FRA)	13	—	—	13
43	Anna-Karin Strömstedt (SWE)	—	—	12	12
43	Jana Gereková (SVK)	—	12	—	12
45	Andreja Mali (SLO)	—	—	11	11
