= 2013–14 Biathlon World Cup – Relay Women =

The 2013–14 Biathlon World Cup – relay women started on Saturday December 7, 2013, in Hochfilzen. Defending titlist is Norway.

== Competition format ==
The relay teams consist of four biathletes, who each ski 7.5 kilometres (4.7 mi), each leg skied over three laps, with two shooting rounds; one prone, one standing. For every round of five targets there are eight bullets available, though the last three can only be single-loaded manually, one at a time, from spare round holders or bullets deposited by the competitor into trays or onto the mat at the firing line. If, after eight bullets, there are still misses, one 150 m penalty loop must be taken for each missed target. The first-leg participants all start at the same time, and, as in cross-country skiing relays, every athlete of a team must touch the team's next-leg participant to perform a valid changeover. On the first shooting stage of the first leg, the participant must shoot in the lane corresponding to their bib number (bib No.10 shoots at lane No.10 regardless of position in race), then for the remainder of the relay, the relay team shoots at the lane in the position they arrived (arrive at the range in fifth place, shoot at lane five).

== 2012–13 Top 3 Standings ==
Medal	Country	Points
Gold:	Norway	314
Silver:	Ukraine	298
Bronze:	Germany	294

== Medal winners ==
Event:	Gold:	Time	Silver:	Time	Bronze:	Time
Hochfilzen details	Ukraine; Juliya Dzhyma; Vita Semerenko; Valj Semerenko; Olena Pidhrushna	1:13:09.2 (0+0) (0+0) (0+1) (0+0) (0+1) (0+1) (0+0) (0+0)	Germany; Franziska Preuß; Andrea Henkel; Franziska Hildebrand; Laura Dahlmeier	1:14:05.5 (0+1) (0+2) (0+1) (0+0) (0+0) (1+3) (0+0) (0+0)	France; Marie Laure Brunet; Sophie Boilley; Anais Chevalier; Anaïs Bescond	1:14:10.0 (0+0) (0+3) (0+0) (0+1) (0+1) (0+1) (0+0) (0+1)
Annecy details	Germany; Franziska Preuß; Andrea Henkel; Franziska Hildebrand; Laura Dahlmeier	1:06:27.8 (0+1) (0+1) (0+0) (0+0) (0+0) (0+1) (0+0) (0+0)	Ukraine; Juliya Dzhyma; Vita Semerenko; Valj Semerenko; Olena Pidhrushna	1:06:51.1 (0+0) (0+3) (0+0) (0+1) (0+0) (0+0) (0+0) (0+0)	Norway; Tiril Eckhoff; Fanny Welle-Strand Horn; Synnøve Solemdal; Tora Berger	1:06:51.6 (0+1) (0+2) (0+1) (0+2) (0+1) (0+1) (0+0) (0+2)
Ruhpolding details	Germany (Note: Russia originally won the race, but after a positive drug test for Irina Starykh, they were disqualified); Franziska Preuß; Evi Sachenbacher-Stehle; Laura Dahlmeier; Franziska Hildebrand	1:09:48.4 (1+3) (0+1) (0+0) (0+1) (0+0) (0+0) (0+0) (0+0)	Norway; Tiril Eckhoff; Ann-Kristin Flatland; Synnøve Solemdal; Tora Berger	1:09:58.9 (0+2) (2+3) (0+0) (0+1) (0+0) (0+0) (0+1) (0+1)	Ukraine; Juliya Dzhyma; Vita Semerenko; Natalya Burdyga; Valj Semerenko	1:10:19.9 (0+1) (0+0) (0+0) (0+1) (0+1) (0+2) (0+0) (0+0)
Antholtz details	Suspended due to poor visibility due to dense fog.					

== Standings ==
#	Name	HOC	ANN	RUP	Total
1	Germany	54	60	60	174
2	Ukraine	60	54	48	162
3	Norway	40	48	54	142
4	France	48	40	43	131
5	Belarus	36	29	40	105
6	Italy	32	36	36	104
7	Canada	30	43	30	103
8	Slovakia	38	32	31	101
9	Czech Republic	29	31	38	98
10	Poland	31	26	34	91
11	Finland	28	30	29	87
12	Switzerland	26	28	32	86
13	Russia	43	38	DSQ	81
14	Sweden	24	27	28	79
15	Austria	25	23	25	73
16	Kazakhstan	23	21	27	71
17	Romania	27	20	23	70
18	United States	34	34	—	68
19	Estonia	21	25	21	67
20	China	19	24	24	67
21	Bulgaria	22	22	22	66
22	Japan	20	19	—	39
23	South Korea	18	18	—	36
24	Slovenia	—	—	26	26
