= 2013–14 Biathlon World Cup – Relay Men =

The 2013–14 Biathlon World Cup – Relay Men started on Saturday December 7, 2013 in Hochfilzen. Defending titlist is Russia.

== Competition format ==
The relay teams consist of four biathletes, who each ski 7.5 kilometres (4.7 mi), each leg skied over three laps, with two shooting rounds; one prone, one standing. For every round of five targets there are eight bullets available, though the last three can only be single-loaded manually one at a time from spare round holders or bullets deposited by the competitor into trays or onto the mat at the firing line. If after eight bullets there are still misses, one 150 m penalty loop must be taken for each missed target remaining. The first-leg participants start all at the same time, and as in cross-country skiing relays, every athlete of a team must touch the team's next-leg participant to perform a valid changeover. On the first shooting stage of the first leg, the participant must shoot in the lane corresponding to their bib number (Bib #10 shoots at lane #10 regardless of position in race.), then for the remainder of the relay, the relay team shoots at the lane in the position they arrived (Arrive at the range in 5th place, you shoot at lane five.).

== 2012–13 Top 3 Standings ==
Medal	Country	Points
Gold:	Russia	305
Silver:	Norway	302
Bronze:	France	296

== Medal winners ==
Event:	Gold:	Time	Silver:	Time	Bronze:	Time
Hochfilzen details	Norway; Vetle Sjåstad Christiansen; Ole Einar Bjørndalen; Tarjei Bø; Emil Hegle Svendsen	1:19:50.8 (0+1) (0+3) (0+0) (0+2) (0+0) (0+3) (0+0) (0+1)	Sweden; Christoffer Eriksson; Björn Ferry; Fredrik Lindström; Carl Johan Bergman	1:20:10.1 (0+0) (0+3) (0+0) (0+0) (0+0) (0+1) (0+0) (0+1)	Russia; Alexey Volkov; Evgeny Ustyugov; Anton Shipulin; Dmitry Malyshko	1:20:11.9 (0+1) (0+0) (0+0) (0+2) (0+1) (0+2) (0+3) (0+1)
Annecy details	Russia; Ivan Tcherezov; Alexandr Loginov; Evgeniy Garanichev; Anton Shipulin	1:14:01.8 (0+0) (0+2) (0+0) (0+2) (0+0) (0+1) (0+0) (0+0)	Germany; Erik Lesser; Andreas Birnbacher; Arnd Peiffer; Simon Schempp	1:14:02.1 (0+0) (0+2) (0+1) (0+0) (0+0) (0+1) (0+0) (0+1)	Austria; Christoph Sumann; Daniel Mesotitsch; Dominik Landertinger; Simon Eder	1:14:28.6 (0+0) (0+1) (0+0) (0+2) (0+0) (0+1) (0+0) (0+3)
Ruhpolding details	Austria; Christoph Sumann; Daniel Mesotitsch; Simon Eder; Dominik Landertinger	1:15:40.9 (0+0) (0+2) (0+2) (0+2) (0+1) (0+0) (0+1) (0+0)	Germany; Christoph Stephan; Andreas Birnbacher; Erik Lesser; Simon Schempp	1:15:41.0 (0+0) (0+3) (0+1) (0+0) (0+0) (0+3) (0+1) (0+1)	Russia; Alexey Volkov; Evgeny Ustyugov; Dmitry Malyshko; Anton Shipulin	1:15:55.8 (0+0) (0+1) (0+1) (0+0) (0+2) (0+1) (0+2) (0+0)
Antholtz details	France; Simon Fourcade; Alexis Bœuf; Jean-Guillaume Béatrix; Martin Fourcade	1:14:34.1 (0+0) (0+2) (0+2) (0+0) (0+0) (0+0) (0+0) (0+0)	Sweden; Tobias Arwidson; Björn Ferry; Fredrik Lindström; Carl Johan Bergman	1:14:36.7 (1+3) (0+1) (0+0) (0+0) (0+0) (0+1) (0+0) (0+0)	Germany; Erik Lesser; Andreas Birnbacher; Arnd Peiffer; Simon Schempp	1:15:12.9 (0+1) (0+2) (0+1) (1+3) (0+0) (0+1) (0+2) (0+0)

== Standings ==
#	Name	HOC	ANN	RUP	ANT	Total
1	Germany	38	54	54	48	194
2	Sweden	54	43	43	54	194
3	Austria	43	48	60	40	191
4	Russia	48	60	48	34	190
5	Norway	60	40	32	43	175
6	France	40	38	31	60	169
7	Czech Republic	36	32	40	29	137
8	Switzerland	34	36	28	32	130
9	Slovenia	27	30	36	27	120
10	Ukraine	29	31	30	28	118
11	Slovakia	28	29	27	31	115
12	Canada	32	—	34	38	104
13	Bulgaria	25	24	24	30	103
14	Estonia	23	27	29	22	101
15	Kazakhstan	22	25	26	26	99
16	Italy	31	28	38	DNF	97
17	Finland	24	21	25	25	95
18	Belarus	26	26	DNF	36	88
19	Romania	21	18	23	23	85
20	Latvia	20	23	21	19	83
21	South Korea	15	17	19	24	75
22	United States	30	34	—	—	64
23	China	17	19	—	21	57
24	Serbia	16	—	20	20	56
25	United Kingdom	14	20	18	—	52
26	Japan	19	22	—	—	41
27	Poland	18	—	22	—	40
