= 2013–14 Biathlon World Cup – Individual Women =

The 2013–14 Biathlon World Cup – Individual Women started at Thursday November 28, 2013. Defending titlist is Tora Berger of Norway.

== Competition format ==
The 20 kilometres (12 mi) individual race is the oldest biathlon event; the distance is skied over five laps. The biathlete shoots four times at any shooting lane, in the order of prone, standing, prone, standing, totalling 20 targets. For each missed target a fixed penalty time, usually one minute, is added to the skiing time of the biathlete. Competitors' starts are staggered, normally by 30 seconds.

== 2012–13 Top 3 Standings ==
Medal	Athlete	Points
Gold:	(Norway) Tora Berger	168
Silver:	(Germany) Andrea Henkel	131
Bronze:	(Belarus) Darya Domracheva	122

== Medal winners ==
Event:	Gold:	Time	Silver:	Time	Bronze:	Time
Östersund details	Gabriela Soukalová; Czech Republic	47:56.0 (0+1+1+0)	Anastasiya Kuzmina; Slovakia	47:57.2 (0+2+0+0)	Marie Laure Brunet; France	48:12.2 (0+0+0+1)
Ruhpolding details	Gabriela Soukalová; Czech Republic	40:32.6 (0+1+0+0)	Darya Domracheva; Belarus	41:06.9 (0+0+0+2)	Veronika Vítková; Czech Republic	41:11.2 (0+0+0+0)

== Standings ==
#	Name	ÖST	RUH	Total
1	Gabriela Soukalová (CZE)	60	60	120
2	Darya Domracheva (BLR)	38	54	92
3	Anastasiya Kuzmina (SVK)	54	30	84
4	Nadezhda Skardino (BLR)	36	36	72
5	Franziska Hildebrand (GER)	28	43	71
6	Marie Laure Brunet (FRA)	48	20	68
7	Dorothea Wierer (ITA)	34	26	60
8	Valj Semerenko (UKR)	25	34	59
9	Tora Berger (NOR)	18	40	58
10	Tiril Eckhoff (NOR)	40	16	56
11	Andrea Henkel (GER)	31	24	55
12	Laura Dahlmeier (GER)	27	27	54
13	Veronika Vítková (CZE)	—	48	48
14	Ann Kristin Flatland (NOR)	19	29	48
15	Ekaterina Iourieva (RUS)	43	—	43
16	Teja Gregorin (SLO)	23	18	41
17	Laure Soulie (AND)	7	32	39
18	Juliya Dzhyma (UKR)	0	38	38
19	Selina Gasparin (SUI)	11	22	33
20	Karin Oberhofer (ITA)	32	0	32
21	Kaisa Mäkäräinen (FIN)	0	31	31
22	Olena Pidhrushna (UKR)	30	—	30
23	Monika Hojnisz (POL)	29	0	29
24	Fuyuko Suzuki (JPN)	0	28	28
25	Katharina Innerhofer (AUT)	8	19	27
26	Kadri Lehtla (EST)	26	—	26
27	Franziska Preuß (GER)	0	25	25
28	Olga Zaitseva (RUS)	24	0	24
29	Olga Vilukhina (RUS)	—	23	23
30	Irina Starykh (RUS)	14	9	23
31	Diana Rasimovičiūtė (LTU)	22	—	22
32	Weronika Nowakowska-Ziemniak (POL)	0	21	21
33	Barbora Tomešová (CZE)	21	0	21
34	Hilde Fenne (NOR)	20	0	20
35	Sophie Boilley (FRA)	17	0	17
36	Lisa Theresa Hauser (AUT)	—	17	17
37	Evi Sachenbacher-Stehle (GER)	16	0	16
38	Rosanna Crawford (CAN)	0	15	15
38	Krystyna Pałka (POL)	15	0	15
40	Elisa Gasparin (SUI)	0	14	14
41	Tang Jialin (CHN)	4	10	14
42	Elise Ringen (NOR)	0	13	13
43	Synnøve Solemdal (NOR)	13	—	13
44	Andreja Mali (SLO)	12	0	12
45	Anaïs Bescond (FRA)	0	12	12
46	Megan Heinicke (CAN)	0	11	11
47	Ekaterina Shumilova (RUS)	10	0	10
48	Magdalena Gwizdoń (POL)	9	0	9
49	Galina Vishnevskaya (KAZ)	—	8	8
50	Vita Semerenko (UKR)	—	7	7
51	Natalya Burdyga (UKR)	0	6	6
52	Nicole Gontier (ITA)	6	0	6
53	Elisabeth Högberg (SWE)	5	0	5
54	Åsa Lif (SWE)	—	5	5
55	Yana Romanova (RUS)	—	4	4
56	Jana Gereková (SVK)	3	0	3
57	Anaïs Chevalier (FRA)	—	3	3
58	Grete Gaim (EST)	2	0	2
59	Elena Khrustaleva (KAZ)	—	2	2
60	Mona Brorsson (SWE)	1	—	1
