= 2013–14 Biathlon World Cup – Individual Men =

The 2013–14 Biathlon World Cup – Individual Men started at Thursday November 28, 2013 in Östersund. Defending titlist is Martin Fourcade of France.

== Competition format ==
The 20 kilometres (12 mi) individual race is the oldest biathlon event; the distance is skied over five laps. The biathlete shoots four times at any shooting lane, in the order of prone, standing, prone, standing, totalling 20 targets. For each missed target a fixed penalty time, usually one minute, is added to the skiing time of the biathlete. Competitors' starts are staggered, normally by 30 seconds.

== 2012–13 Top 3 Standings ==
| Medal | Athlete | Points |
|---|---|---|
| Gold: | (France) Martin Fourcade | 180 |
| Silver: | (Germany) Andreas Birnbacher | 104 |
| Bronze: | (United States) Tim Burke | 102 |

== Medal winners ==
| Event: | Gold: | Time | Silver: | Time | Bronze: | Time |
|---|---|---|---|---|---|---|
| Östersund details | Martin Fourcade; France | 50:10.9 (0+0+0+0) | Simon Eder; Austria | 52:17.0 (0+0+0+1) | Daniel Mesotitsch; Austria | 52:31.1 (1+0+0+0) |
| Ruhpolding details | Emil Hegle Svendsen; Norway | 48:58.5 (1+0+0+0) | Alexey Volkov; Russia | 49:13.1 (0+0+0+0) | Evgeny Ustyugov; Russia | 49:15.0 (0+1+0+0) |

== Standings ==
| # | Name | ÖST | RUH | Total |
|---|---|---|---|---|
| 1 | Emil Hegle Svendsen (NOR) | 23 | 60 | 83 |
| 2 | Simon Eder (AUT) | 54 | 25 | 79 |
| 3 | Evgeny Ustyugov (RUS) | 28 | 48 | 76 |
| 4 | Alexey Volkov (RUS) | 21 | 54 | 75 |
| 5 | Simon Fourcade (FRA) | 29 | 36 | 65 |
| 6 | Christian De Lorenzi (ITA) | 34 | 31 | 65 |
| 7 | Martin Fourcade (FRA) | 60 | — | 60 |
| 8 | Daniel Böhm (GER) | 40 | 19 | 59 |
| 9 | Dominik Landertinger (AUT) | 17 | 40 | 57 |
| 10 | Serhiy Semenov (UKR) | 30 | 27 | 57 |
| 11 | Daniel Mesotitsch (AUT) | 48 | 0 | 48 |
| 12 | Ondřej Moravec (CZE) | 36 | 12 | 48 |
| 13 | Johannes Thingnes Bø (NOR) | 14 | 34 | 48 |
| 14 | Alexandr Loginov (RUS) | 26 | 20 | 46 |
| 15 | Jakov Fak (SLO) | 0 | 43 | 43 |
| 16 | Jean-Philippe Leguellec (CAN) | 43 | 0 | 43 |
| 17 | Tobias Arwidson (SWE) | 19 | 24 | 43 |
| 18 | Alexis Bœuf (FRA) | 12 | 28 | 40 |
| 19 | Dmitry Malyshko (RUS) | 0 | 38 | 38 |
| 20 | Lukas Hofer (ITA) | 38 | 0 | 38 |
| 21 | Lowell Bailey (USA) | 22 | 16 | 38 |
| 22 | Simon Desthieux (FRA) | 20 | 18 | 38 |
| 23 | Erik Lesser (GER) | 31 | 2 | 33 |
| 24 | Evgeny Abramenko (BLR) | 18 | 15 | 33 |
| 25 | Klemen Bauer (SLO) | 32 | 0 | 32 |
| 26 | Simon Schempp (GER) | — | 32 | 32 |
| 27 | Jaroslav Soukup (CZE) | 0 | 31 | 31 |
| 28 | Evgeniy Garanichev (RUS) | 0 | 30 | 30 |
| 29 | Fredrik Lindström (SWE) | 7 | 22 | 29 |
| 30 | Björn Ferry (SWE) | 2 | 26 | 28 |
| 31 | Friedrich Pinter (AUT) | 27 | 0 | 27 |
| 32 | Nathan Smith (CAN) | 25 | 1 | 26 |
| 33 | Vetle Sjåstad Christiansen (NOR) | 24 | 0 | 24 |
| 34 | Andrejs Rastorgujevs (LAT) | 0 | 23 | 23 |
| 35 | Anton Shipulin (RUS) | — | 21 | 21 |
| 36 | Michal Šlesingr (CZE) | — | 17 | 17 |
| 37 | Jean-Guillaume Béatrix (FRA) | 16 | 0 | 16 |
| 38 | Christoph Stephan (GER) | 15 | — | 15 |
| 39 | Christoph Sumann (AUT) | — | 14 | 14 |
| 40 | Arnd Peiffer (GER) | 3 | 11 | 14 |
| 41 | Pavol Hurajt (SVK) | 0 | 13 | 13 |
| 42 | Ivan Tcherezov (RUS) | 13 | — | 13 |
| 43 | Olli Hiidensalo (FIN) | 11 | 0 | 11 |
| 44 | Ole Einar Bjørndalen (NOR) | 10 | — | 10 |
| 44 | Anton Pantov (KAZ) | — | 10 | 10 |
| 46 | Henrik L'Abée-Lund (NOR) | 9 | 0 | 9 |
| 47 | Andriy Deryzemlya (UKR) | 0 | 9 | 9 |
| 48 | Vladimir Chepelin (BLR) | 0 | 8 | 8 |
| 49 | Matej Kazár (SVK) | 8 | — | 8 |
| 50 | Tarjei Bø (NOR) | 4 | 4 | 8 |
| 51 | Benjamin Weger (SUI) | 0 | 7 | 7 |
| 52 | Milanko Petrović (SRB) | 0 | 6 | 6 |
| 53 | Danil Steptsenko (EST) | 6 | 0 | 6 |
| 54 | Michal Kletcherov (BUL) | 5 | 0 | 5 |
| 55 | Scott Perras (CAN) | 0 | 5 | 5 |
| 56 | Andreas Birnbacher (GER) | — | 3 | 3 |
| 57 | Krasimir Anev (BUL) | 1 | 0 | 1 |
