= 2013–14 Biathlon World Cup – Mass start Men =

The 2013–14 Biathlon World Cup – Mass start Men started at Sunday January 5 in Oberhof and will finish Sunday March 23 in Holmenkollen. Defending titlist is Martin Fourcade of France.

== 2012-13 Top 3 Standings ==
Medal	Athlete	Points
Gold:	(France) Martin Fourcade	248
Silver:	(Norway) Emil Hegle Svendsen	182
Bronze:	(United States) Tim Burke	167

== Medal winners ==
Event:	Gold:	Time	Silver:	Time	Bronze:	Time
Oberhof details	Martin Fourcade; France	37:39.4 (1+0+0+0)	Alexey Volkov; Russia	37:44.6 (0+0+0+0)	Tarjei Bø; Norway	37:58.4 (0+1+1+0)
Pokljuka details	Björn Ferry; Sweden	35:19.3 (0+0+0+0)	Martin Fourcade; France	35:24.0 (0+0+0+0)	Evgeny Ustyugov; Russia	35:31.8 (0+0+0+0)
Holmenkollen details	Martin Fourcade; France	40:59.9 (0+0+1+0)	Dominik Landertinger; Austria	41:06.9 (0+0+0+0)	Jakov Fak; Slovenia	41:32.8 (0+0+1+1)

== Standings ==
#	Name	OBE	POK	HOL	Total
1	Martin Fourcade (FRA)	60	54	60	174
2	Dominik Landertinger (AUT)	38	17	54	109
3	Emil Hegle Svendsen (NOR)	30	43	27	100
4	Tim Burke (USA)	32	36	32	100
5	Simon Desthieux (FRA)	28	28	43	99
6	Jean-Guillaume Béatrix (FRA)	24	38	31	93
7	Andrejs Rastorgujevs (LAT)	27	30	36	93
8	Ole Einar Bjørndalen (NOR)	20	32	40	92
9	Ondřej Moravec (CZE)	40	29	16	85
10	Johannes Thingnes Bø (NOR)	23	40	19	82
11	Alexandr Loginov (RUS)	34	31	14	79
12	Björn Ferry (SWE)	—	60	18	78
13	Lukas Hofer (ITA)	36	12	30	78
14	Fredrik Lindström (SWE)	26	25	21	72
15	Dmitry Malyshko (RUS)	31	23	17	71
16	Alexey Volkov (RUS)	54	16	0	70
17	Jakov Fak (SLO)	—	22	48	70
18	Serhiy Semenov (UKR)	18	27	25	70
19	Evgeny Ustyugov (RUS)	17	48	—	65
20	Daniel Böhm (GER)	16	34	12	60
21	Simon Schempp (GER)	19	15	26	60
22	Arnd Peiffer (GER)	—	24	34	58
23	Anton Shipulin (RUS)	29	—	27	57
24	Tarjei Bø (NOR)	48	—	—	48
25	Simon Eder (AUT)	0	26	22	48
26	Andreas Birnbacher (GER)	43	—	—	43
27	Evgeniy Garanichev (RUS)	—	—	38	38
28	Jaroslav Soukup (CZE)	—	18	20	38
29	Lowell Bailey (USA)	—	21	13	34
30	David Komatz (AUT)	—	—	29	29
#	Name	OBE	POK	HOL	Total
31	Christoph Stephan (AUT)	25	—	—	25
32	Carl Johan Bergman (SWE)	—	—	24	24
33	Lars Berger (NOR)	—	—	23	23
34	Michal Šlesingr (CZE)	22	—	—	22
35	Erik Lesser (GER)	21	—	—	21
36	Brendan Green (CAN)	—	20	—	20
37	Dmytro Pidruchnyi (UKR)	—	19	—	19
38	Quentin Fillon Maillet (FRA)	—	—	15	15
38	Kauri Kõiv (EST)	15	—	—	15
40	Klemen Bauer (SLO)	—	14	—	14
40	Benjamin Weger (SUI)	14	—	—	14
42	Friedrich Pinter (AUT)	—	13	—	13
42	Artem Pryma (UKR)	13	—	—	13
