= 2013–14 Biathlon World Cup =

Biathlon competition

Discipline	Men	Women
Overall	(France) Martin Fourcade	(Finland) Kaisa Mäkäräinen (Norway) Tora Berger (Note: Kaisa Mäkäräinen was the winner at the conclusion of the season with Tora Berger 2nd. However, the results of Olga Zaitseva were later annulled due do doping offences. The recalculation would have given overall world cup win to Berger, but the IBU made the decision based on the principle that clean athletes cannot be punished for the doping offenses of others.)
Nations Cup	Norway	Norway
Individual	(Norway) Emil Hegle Svendsen	(Czech Republic) Gabriela Soukalová
Sprint	(France) Martin Fourcade	(Finland) Kaisa Mäkäräinen
Pursuit	(France) Martin Fourcade	(Finland) Kaisa Mäkäräinen
Mass start	(France) Martin Fourcade	(Belarus) Darya Domracheva
Relay	Germany	Germany
- Mixed: Norway; Czech Republic

Competition

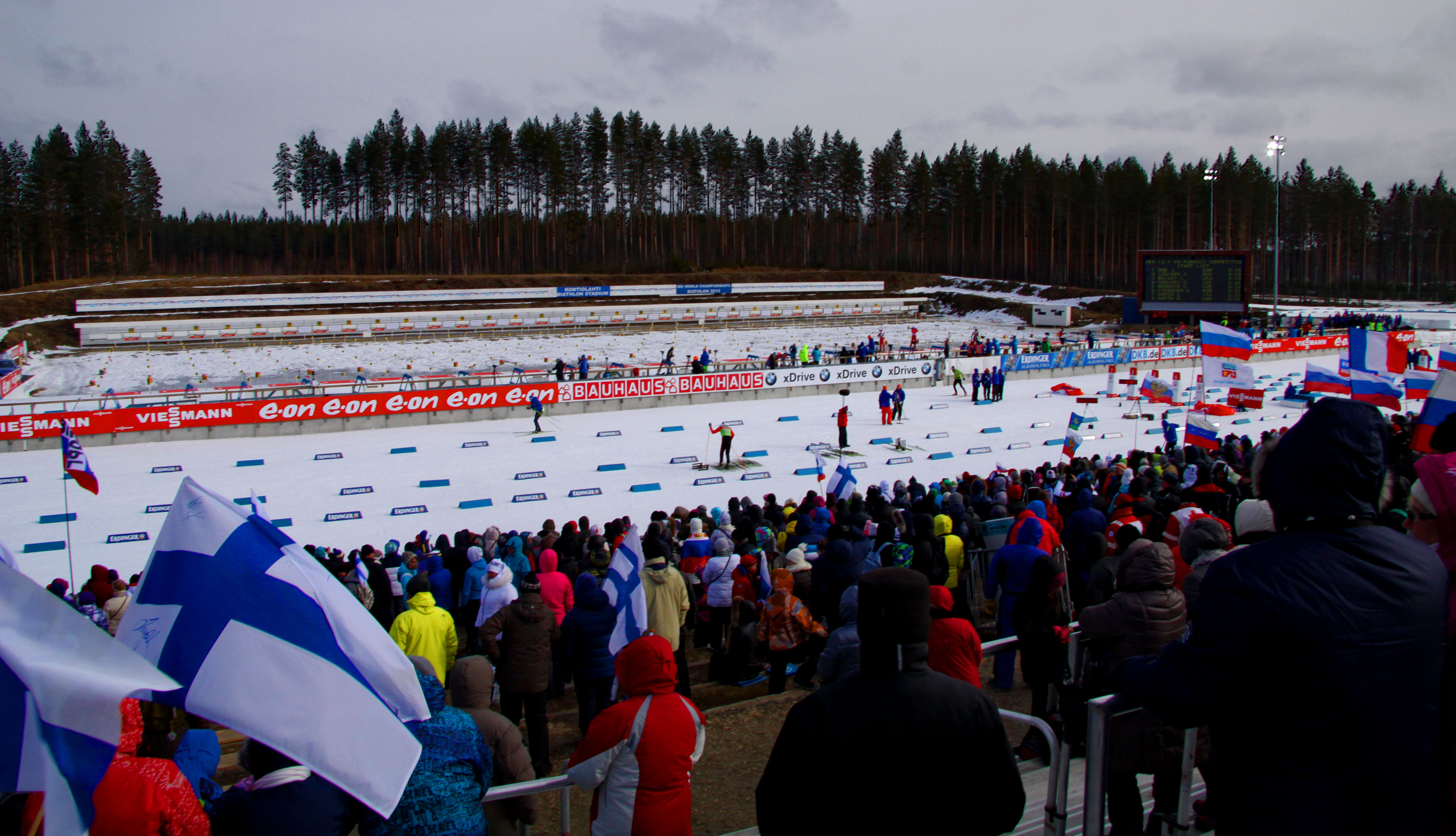
2013–14 World Cup in Kontiolahti

The 2013–14 Biathlon World Cup was a multi-race tournament over a season of biathlon, organised by the International Biathlon Union. The season started on 24 November 2013 in Östersund, Sweden, and ended on 23 March 2014 in Holmenkollen, Norway.

Kaisa Mäkäräinen was the winner at the conclusion of the season with Tora Berger 2nd. However, the results of Olga Zaitseva were later annulled due do doping offences. The recalculation would have given overall world cup win to Berger, but the IBU made the decision based on the principle that clean athletes cannot be punished for the doping offenses of others. So, two first places were awarded in the women's overall.

== Calendar ==
Below is the IBU World Cup calendar for the 2013–14 season.

Stage	Location	Date	Individual	Sprint	Pursuit	Mass start	Relay	Mixed relay	Details
1	(Sweden) Östersund	24 November–1 December	●	●				●	details
2	(Austria) Hochfilzen	6–8 December		●	●		●		details
3	(France) Annecy-Le Grand-Bornand	12–15 December		●	●		●		details
4	(Germany) Oberhof	3–5 January		●	●	●			details
5	(Germany) Ruhpolding	8–12 January	●		●		●		details
6	(Italy) Antholz-Anterselva	16–19 January		●	●		●		details
OG	(Russia) Sochi	8–22 February	Olympic Games					●	
7	(Slovenia) Pokljuka	6–9 March		●	●	●			details
8	(Finland) Kontiolahti	13–16 March		●●	●				details
9	(Norway) Holmenkollen	20–23 March		●	●	●			details
Total: 54 (26 men's, 26 women's, 2 mixed)			2	9	8	3	4	2	

- 2014 Winter Olympics races are not included in the 2013–14 World Cup scoring system with the exception of mixed relay.
- In stage 6, women's relay was suspended due to poor visibility and dense fog.

== World Cup podiums ==
=== Men ===
Stage	Date	Place	Discipline	Winner	Second	Third	Yellow bib (After competition)	Det.
1	28 November 2013	(Sweden) Östersund	20 km Individual	(France) Martin Fourcade	(Austria) Simon Eder	(Austria) Daniel Mesotitsch	(France) Martin Fourcade	Detail
1	30 November 2013	(Sweden) Östersund	10 km Sprint	(France) Martin Fourcade	(Sweden) Fredrik Lindström	(United States) Tim Burke	(France) Martin Fourcade	Detail
1	1 December 2013	(Sweden) Östersund	12.5 km Pursuit	Cancelled due to strong winds			(France) Martin Fourcade	Detail
2	6 December 2013	(Austria) Hochfilzen	10 km Sprint	(Norway) Lars Berger	(France) Martin Fourcade	(Norway) Ole Einar Bjørndalen	(France) Martin Fourcade	Detail
2	8 December 2013	(Austria) Hochfilzen	12.5 km Pursuit	(France) Martin Fourcade	(Norway) Emil Hegle Svendsen	(Norway) Tarjei Bø	(France) Martin Fourcade	Detail
3	14 December 2013	(France) Le Grand-Bornand	10 km Sprint	(Norway) Johannes Thingnes Bø	(Czech Republic) Ondřej Moravec	(France) Martin Fourcade	(France) Martin Fourcade	Detail
3	15 December 2013	(France) Le Grand-Bornand	12.5 km Pursuit	(Norway) Johannes Thingnes Bø	(Germany) Erik Lesser	(Russia) Anton Shipulin	(France) Martin Fourcade	Detail
4	3 January 2014	(Germany) Oberhof	10 km Sprint	(Norway) Emil Hegle Svendsen	(Norway) Ole Einar Bjørndalen	(France) Martin Fourcade	(France) Martin Fourcade	Detail
4	4 January 2014	(Germany) Oberhof	12.5 km Pursuit	(Norway) Emil Hegle Svendsen	(Norway) Ole Einar Bjørndalen	(France) Martin Fourcade	(France) Martin Fourcade	Detail
4	5 January 2014	(Germany) Oberhof	15 km Mass Start	(France) Martin Fourcade	(Russia) Alexey Volkov	(Norway) Tarjei Bø	(France) Martin Fourcade	Detail
5	11 January 2014	(Germany) Ruhpolding	20 km Individual	(Norway) Emil Hegle Svendsen	(Russia) Alexey Volkov	(Russia) Evgeny Ustyugov	(France) Martin Fourcade	Detail
5	12 January 2014	(Germany) Ruhpolding	12.5 km Pursuit	(Norway) Emil Hegle Svendsen	(Slovenia) Jakov Fak	(Russia) Evgeny Garanichev	(France) Martin Fourcade	Detail
6	17 January 2014	(Italy) Antholz-Anterselva	10 km Sprint	(Italy) Lukas Hofer (Germany) Simon Schempp		(Germany) Arnd Peiffer	(France) Martin Fourcade	Detail
6	18 January 2014	(Italy) Antholz-Anterselva	12.5 km Pursuit	(Germany) Simon Schempp	(France) Jean-Guillaume Béatrix	(Norway) Henrik L'Abée-Lund	(France) Martin Fourcade	Detail
OG	8 February 2014	(Russia) Sochi	10 km Sprint	(Norway) Ole Einar Bjørndalen	(Austria) Dominik Landertinger	(Czech Republic) Jaroslav Soukup		Detail
OG	10 February 2014	(Russia) Sochi	12.5 km Pursuit	(France) Martin Fourcade	(Czech Republic) Ondřej Moravec	(France) Jean-Guillaume Béatrix		Detail
OG	13 February 2014	(Russia) Sochi	20 km Individual	(France) Martin Fourcade	(Germany) Erik Lesser	(Russia) Evgeny Garanichev		Detail
OG	18 February 2014	(Russia) Sochi	15 km Mass Start	(Norway) Emil Hegle Svendsen	(France) Martin Fourcade	(Czech Republic) Ondřej Moravec		Detail
7	6 March 2014	(Slovenia) Pokljuka	10 km Sprint	(Sweden) Björn Ferry	(Russia) Anton Shipulin	(Germany) Arnd Peiffer	(France) Martin Fourcade	Detail
7	8 March 2014	(Slovenia) Pokljuka	12.5 km Pursuit	(Russia) Anton Shipulin	(Sweden) Björn Ferry	(Norway) Ole Einar Bjørndalen	(France) Martin Fourcade	Detail
7	9 March 2014	(Slovenia) Pokljuka	15 km Mass Start	(Sweden) Björn Ferry	(France) Martin Fourcade	(Russia) Evgeny Ustyugov	(France) Martin Fourcade	Detail
8	13 March 2014	(Finland) Kontiolahti	10 km Sprint	(Norway) Johannes Thingnes Bø	(France) Martin Fourcade	(Germany) Arnd Peiffer	(France) Martin Fourcade	Detail
8	15 March 2014	(Finland) Kontiolahti	10 km Sprint	(Norway) Johannes Thingnes Bø	(United States) Lowell Bailey	(Czech Republic) Ondřej Moravec	(France) Martin Fourcade	Detail
8	16 March 2014	(Finland) Kontiolahti	12.5 km Pursuit	(Norway) Johannes Thingnes Bø	(France) Martin Fourcade	(Sweden) Björn Ferry	(France) Martin Fourcade	Detail
9	20 March 2014	(Norway) Oslo Holmenkollen	10 km Sprint	(Slovenia) Jakov Fak	(Russia) Evgeny Garanichev	(Sweden) Björn Ferry	(France) Martin Fourcade	Detail
9	22 March 2014	(Norway) Oslo Holmenkollen	12.5 km Pursuit	(Austria) Simon Eder	(Sweden) Björn Ferry	(Sweden) Carl Johan Bergman	(France) Martin Fourcade	Detail
9	23 March 2014	(Norway) Oslo Holmenkollen	15 km Mass Start	(France) Martin Fourcade	(Austria) Dominik Landertinger	(Slovenia) Jakov Fak	(France) Martin Fourcade	Detail

=== Women ===
Stage	Date	Place	Discipline	Winner	Second	Third	Yellow bib (After competition)	Det.
1	28 November 2013	(Sweden) Östersund	15 km Individual	(Czech Republic) Gabriela Soukalová	(Slovakia) Anastázia Kuzminová	(France) Marie-Laure Brunet	(Czech Republic) Gabriela Soukalová	Detail
1	29 November 2013	(Sweden) Östersund	7.5 km Sprint	(Norway) Ann Kristin Flatland	(Russia) Olga Zaitseva	(Norway) Tora Berger	(Czech Republic) Gabriela Soukalová	Detail
1	1 December 2013	(Sweden) Östersund	10 km Pursuit	Cancelled due to strong winds			(Czech Republic) Gabriela Soukalová	Detail
2	6 December 2013	(Austria) Hochfilzen	7.5 km Sprint	(Switzerland) Selina Gasparin	(Czech Republic) Veronika Vítková	(Russia) Irina Starykh	(Czech Republic) Gabriela Soukalová	Detail
2	8 December 2013	(Austria) Hochfilzen	10 km Pursuit	(Norway) Synnøve Solemdal	(Ukraine) Yuliia Dzhima	(Poland) Krystyna Pałka	(Czech Republic) Gabriela Soukalová	Detail
3	14 December 2013	(France) Le Grand-Bornand	7.5 km Sprint	(Switzerland) Selina Gasparin	(Finland) Kaisa Mäkäräinen	(Ukraine) Valentyna Semerenko	(Czech Republic) Gabriela Soukalová	Detail
3	15 December 2013	(France) Le Grand-Bornand	10 km Pursuit	(Ukraine) Valentyna Semerenko	(Russia) Irina Starykh	(Norway) Tiril Eckhoff	(Czech Republic) Gabriela Soukalová	Detail
4	3 January 2014	(Germany) Oberhof	7.5 km Sprint	(Belarus) Darya Domracheva	(Finland) Kaisa Mäkäräinen	(Ukraine) Olena Pidhrushna	(Czech Republic) Gabriela Soukalová	Detail
4	4 January 2014	(Germany) Oberhof	10 km Pursuit	(Belarus) Darya Domracheva	(Finland) Kaisa Mäkäräinen	(Norway) Synnøve Solemdal	(Ukraine) Valentyna Semerenko	Detail
4	5 January 2014	(Germany) Oberhof	12.5 km Mass Start	(Norway) Tora Berger	(Norway) Synnøve Solemdal	(Belarus) Darya Domracheva	(Czech Republic) Gabriela Soukalová	Detail
5	10 January 2014	(Germany) Ruhpolding	15 km Individual	(Czech Republic) Gabriela Soukalová	(Belarus) Darya Domracheva	(Czech Republic) Veronika Vítková	(Czech Republic) Gabriela Soukalová	Detail
5	12 January 2014	(Germany) Ruhpolding	10 km Pursuit	(Czech Republic) Gabriela Soukalová	(Norway) Tora Berger	(Finland) Kaisa Mäkäräinen	(Czech Republic) Gabriela Soukalová	Detail
6	16 January 2014	(Italy) Antholz-Anterselva	7.5 km Sprint	(France) Anaïs Bescond	(Germany) Andrea Henkel	(Belarus) Darya Domracheva	(Czech Republic) Gabriela Soukalová	Detail
6	18 January 2014	(Italy) Antholz-Anterselva	10 km Pursuit	(Germany) Andrea Henkel	(Belarus) Nadezhda Skardino	(Norway) Tora Berger	(Belarus) Darya Domracheva	Detail
OG	9 February 2014	(Russia) Sochi	7.5 km Sprint	(Slovakia) Anastázia Kuzminová	(Russia) Olga Vilukhina	(Ukraine) Vita Semerenko		Detail
OG	11 February 2014	(Russia) Sochi	10 km Pursuit	(Belarus) Darya Domracheva	(Norway) Tora Berger	(Slovenia) Teja Gregorin		Detail
OG	14 February 2014	(Russia) Sochi	15 km Individual	(Belarus) Darya Domracheva	(Switzerland) Selina Gasparin	(Belarus) Nadezhda Skardino		Detail
OG	17 February 2014	(Russia) Sochi	12.5 km Mass Start	(Belarus) Darya Domracheva	(Czech Republic) Gabriela Soukalová	(Norway) Tiril Eckhoff		Detail
7	6 March 2014	(Slovenia) Pokljuka	7.5 km Sprint	(Austria) Katharina Innerhofer	(Russia) Daria Virolaynen	(Belarus) Nadezhda Skardino	(Norway) Tora Berger	Detail
7	8 March 2014	(Slovenia) Pokljuka	10 km Pursuit	(Finland) Kaisa Mäkäräinen	(Norway) Tora Berger	(Italy) Dorothea Wierer	(Norway) Tora Berger	Detail
7	9 March 2014	(Slovenia) Pokljuka	12.5 km Mass Start	(Belarus) Darya Domracheva	(Finland) Kaisa Mäkäräinen	(Slovakia) Anastázia Kuzminová	(Finland) Kaisa Mäkäräinen	Detail
8	13 March 2014	(Finland) Kontiolahti	7.5 km Sprint	(Finland) Kaisa Mäkäräinen	(Russia) Olga Zaitseva	(Finland) Mari Laukkanen	(Finland) Kaisa Mäkäräinen	Detail
8	15 March 2014	(Finland) Kontiolahti	7.5 km Sprint	(Finland) Kaisa Mäkäräinen	(Norway) Tora Berger	(Czech Republic) Gabriela Soukalová	(Finland) Kaisa Mäkäräinen	Detail
8	16 March 2014	(Finland) Kontiolahti	10 km Pursuit	(Finland) Kaisa Mäkäräinen	(Belarus) Darya Domracheva	(Russia) Olga Zaitseva	(Finland) Kaisa Mäkäräinen	Detail
9	20 March 2014	(Norway) Oslo Holmenkollen	7.5 km Sprint	(Belarus) Darya Domracheva	(Norway) Tora Berger	(United States) Susan Dunklee	(Finland) Kaisa Mäkäräinen	Detail
9	22 March 2014	(Norway) Oslo Holmenkollen	10 km Pursuit	(Slovakia) Anastázia Kuzminová	(Norway) Tora Berger	(Russia) Olga Vilukhina	(Finland) Kaisa Mäkäräinen	Detail
9	23 March 2014	(Norway) Oslo Holmenkollen	12.5 km Mass Start	(Slovakia) Anastázia Kuzminová	(Slovenia) Teja Gregorin	(France) Marie Dorin Habert	(Finland) Kaisa Mäkäräinen	Detail

=== Men's team ===
Event	Date	Place	Discipline	Winner	Second	Third
2	7 December 2013	(Austria) Hochfilzen	4x7.5 km Relay	Norway Vetle Sjastad Christiansen; Ole Einar Bjørndalen; Tarjei Bø; Emil Hegle Svendsen	Sweden Christoffer Eriksson; Björn Ferry; Fredrik Lindström; Carl Johan Bergman	Russia Alexey Volkov; Evgeny Ustyugov; Anton Shipulin; Dmitry Malyshko
3	13 December 2013	(France) Le Grand-Bornand	4x7.5 km Relay	Germany Erik Lesser; Andreas Birnbacher; Arnd Peiffer; Simon Schempp	Austria Christoph Sumann; Daniel Mesotitsch; Dominik Landertinger; Simon Eder	Sweden Tobias Arwidson; Björn Ferry; Fredrik Lindström; Carl Johan Bergman
5	9 January 2014	(Germany) Ruhpolding	4x7.5 km Relay	Austria Christoph Sumann; Daniel Mesotitsch; Simon Eder; Dominik Landertinger	Germany Christoph Stephan; Andreas Birnbacher; Erik Lesser; Simon Schempp	Russia Alexey Volkov; Evgeny Ustyugov; Dmitry Malyshko; Anton Shipulin
6	19 January 2014	(Italy) Antholz-Anterselva	4x7.5 km Relay	France Simon Fourcade; Alexis Boeuf; Jean-Guillaume Béatrix; Martin Fourcade	Sweden Tobias Arwidson; Björn Ferry; Fredrik Lindström; Carl Johan Bergman	Germany Erik Lesser; Andreas Birnbacher; Arnd Peiffer; Simon Schempp
OG	22 February 2014	(Russia) Sochi	4x7.5 km Relay	Russia Alexey Volkov; Evgeny Ustyugov; Dmitry Malyshko; Anton Shipulin	Germany Erik Lesser; Daniel Böhm; Arnd Peiffer; Simon Schempp	Austria Christoph Sumann; Daniel Mesotitsch; Simon Eder; Dominik Landertinger

=== Women's team ===
Event	Date	Place	Discipline	Winner	Second	Third
2	7 December 2013	(Austria) Hochfilzen	4x7.5 km Relay	Ukraine Yuliia Dzhima; Vita Semerenko; Valj Semerenko; Olena Pidhrushna	Germany Franziska Preuss; Andrea Henkel; Franziska Hildebrand; Laura Dahlmeier	France Marie-Laure Brunet; Sophie Boilley; Anais Chevalier; Anais Bescond
3	12 December 2013	(France) Le Grand-Bornand	4x7.5 km Relay	Germany Franziska Preuss; Andrea Henkel; Franziska Hildebrand; Laura Dahlmeier	Ukraine Yuliia Dzhima; Vita Semerenko; Valj Semerenko; Olena Pidhrushna	Norway Tiril Eckhoff; Fanny Horn; Synnove Solemdal; Tora Berger
5	8 January 2014	(Germany) Ruhpolding	4x7.5 km Relay	Germany Franziska Preuss; Evi Sachenbacher-Stehle; Laura Dahlmeier; Franziska Hildebrand	Norway Tiril Eckhoff; Ann Kristin Flatland; Synnove Solemdal; Tora Berger	Ukraine Yuliia Dzhima; Vita Semerenko; Natalya Burdyga; Valj Semerenko
OG	21 February 2014	(Russia) Sochi	4x6 km Relay	Ukraine Vita Semerenko; Juliya Dzhyma; Valentyna Semerenko; Olena Pidhrushna	Norway Fanny Welle-Strand Horn; Tiril Eckhoff; Ann Kristin Aafeldt Flatland; Tora Berger	Czech Republic Eva Puskarčíková; Gabriela Koukalová; Jitka Landová; Veronika Vítková

=== Mixed relay ===
Event	Date	Place	Discipline	Winner	Second	Third
1	24 November 2013	(Sweden) Östersund	4x7.5 km Relay	Czech Republic Veronika Vítková; Gabriela Soukalová; Zdeněk Vítek; Ondřej Moravec	Norway Tora Berger; Synnove Solemdal; Vetle Sjastad Christiansen; Tarjei Bo	Ukraine Olena Pidhrushna; Valj Semerenko; Serhiy Semenov; Andriy Deryzemlya
OG	19 February 2014	(Russia) Sochi	4x6 km/7.5 km Relay	Norway Tora Berger; Tiril Eckhoff; Ole Einar Bjørndalen; Emil Hegle Svendsen	Czech Republic Veronika Vítková; Gabriela Soukalová; Jaroslav Soukup; Ondřej Moravec	Italy Dorothea Wierer; Karin Oberhofer; Dominik Windisch; Lukas Hofer

== Standings (men) ==
=== Overall ===
Pos.		Points
1.	(France) Martin Fourcade	934
2.	(Norway) Emil Hegle Svendsen	642
3.	(Norway) Johannes Thingnes Bø	636
4.	(Austria) Dominik Landertinger	616
5.	(Austria) Simon Eder	585

- Final standings after 22 races.

=== Individual ===
Pos.		Points
1.	(Norway) Emil Hegle Svendsen	84
2.	(Austria) Simon Eder	79
3.	(Russia) Alexey Volkov	76
4.	(Russia) Evgeny Ustyugov	76
5.	(Italy) Christian De Lorenzi	65

- Final standings after 2 races.

=== Sprint ===
Pos.		Points
1.	(France) Martin Fourcade	402
2.	(Germany) Arnd Peiffer	289
3.	(Norway) Johannes Thingnes Bø	278
4.	(Norway) Ole Einar Bjørndalen	262
5.	(Austria) Dominik Landertinger	252

- Final standings after 9 races.

=== Pursuit ===
Pos.		Points
1.	(France) Martin Fourcade	298
2.	(Sweden) Björn Ferry	241
3.	(Austria) Simon Eder	237
4.	(Russia) Anton Shipulin	236
5.	(Norway) Johannes Thingnes Bø	226

- Final standings after 8 races.

=== Mass start ===
Pos.		Points
1.	(France) Martin Fourcade	174
2.	(Austria) Dominik Landertinger	110
3.	(United States) Tim Burke	102
4.	(Norway) Emil Hegle Svendsen	101
5.	(France) Simon Desthieux	101

- Final standings after 3 races.

=== Relay ===
Pos.		Points
1.	Germany	200
2.	Sweden	199
3.	Austria	197
4.	Norway	178
5.	France	171

- Final standings after 4 races.

=== Nation ===
Pos.		Points
1.	Norway	5968
2.	Germany	5847
3.	Austria	5761
4.	France	5712
5.	Sweden	5452

- Final standings after 17 races.

== Standings (women) ==
=== Overall ===
Pos.		Points
1.	(Finland) Kaisa Mäkäräinen	861
1.	(Norway) Tora Berger	857
3.	(Belarus) Darya Domracheva	795
4.	(Czech Republic) Gabriela Soukalová	614
5.	(Russia) Olga Vilukhina	613

- Final standings after 22 races.

=== Individual ===
Pos.		Points
1.	(Czech Republic) Gabriela Soukalová	120
2.	(Belarus) Darya Domracheva	94
3.	(Slovakia) Anastasiya Kuzmina	84
4.	(Belarus) Nadezhda Skardino	74
5.	(Germany) Franziska Hildebrand	72

- Final standings after 2 races.

=== Sprint ===
Pos.		Points
1.	(Finland) Kaisa Mäkäräinen	368
2.	(Norway) Tora Berger	361
3.	(Belarus) Darya Domracheva	254
4.	(Russia) Olga Vilukhina	246
5.	(Czech Republic) Gabriela Soukalová	239

- Final standings after 9 races.

=== Pursuit ===
Pos.		Points
1.	(Finland) Kaisa Mäkäräinen	350
2.	(Norway) Tora Berger	319
3.	(Belarus) Darya Domracheva	296
4.	(Russia) Olga Vilukhina	242
5.	(Norway) Tiril Eckhoff	236

- Final standings after 8 races.

=== Mass start ===
Pos.		Points
1.	(Belarus) Darya Domracheva	151
2.	(Slovakia) Anastasiya Kuzmina	139
3.	(Finland) Kaisa Mäkäräinen	130
4.	(Norway) Tora Berger	121
5.	(Russia) Olga Vilukhina	102

- Final standings after 3 races.

=== Relay ===
Pos.		Points
1.	Germany	174
2.	Ukraine	162
3.	Norway	142
4.	France	131
5.	Belarus	105

- Final standings after 3 races.

=== Nation ===
Pos.		Points
1.	Norway	5641
2.	Germany	5460
3.	Ukraine	5377
4.	France	4968
5.	Russia	4945

- Final standings after 17 races.

== Standings: Mixed ==
=== Mixed relay ===
Pos.		Points
1.	Czech Republic	114
1.	Norway	114
3.	Italy	91
4.	Ukraine	84
5.	Russia	81

- Final standings after 2 races.

== Medal table ==
Rank	Nation	Gold	Silver	Bronze	Total
1	Norway	15	11	10	36
2	France	7	5	6	18
3	Germany	6	4	4	14
4	Finland	4	4	2	10
5	Belarus	4	3	3	10
5	Czech Republic	4	3	3	10
7	Austria	3	3	1	7
8	Sweden	2	5	4	11
9	Ukraine	2	2	4	8
10	Slovakia	2	1	1	4
11	Switzerland	2	0	0	2
12	Russia	1	8	10	19
13	Slovenia	1	2	1	4
14	Italy	1	0	2	3
15	United States	0	1	2	3
16	Poland	0	0	1	1
Totals (16 entries)		54	52	54	160

== Achievements ==
First World Cup career victory

- Selina Gasparin (SUI), 29, in her 6th season — the WC 2 Sprint in Hochfilzen; it also was her first podium
- Johannes Thingnes Bø (NOR), 20, in his 2nd season — the WC 3 Sprint in Annecy-Le Grand Bornand; it also was his first podium
- Valj Semerenko (UKR), 27, in her 8th season — the WC 3 Pursuit in Annecy-Le Grand Bornand; first podium was 2010–11 Sprint in Presque Isle
- Anaïs Bescond (FRA), 26, in her 5th season — the WC 6 Sprint in Antholz-Anterselva; it also was her first podium
- Lukas Hofer (ITA), 24, in his 5th season — the WC 6 Sprint in Antholz-Anterselva; first podium was 2010–11 Mass start in Khanty-Mansiysk
- Simon Schempp (GER), 25, in his 6th season — the WC 6 Sprint in Antholz-Anterselva; first podium was 2009–10 Pursuit in Holmenkollen
- Katharina Innerhofer (AUT), 23, in her 3rd season — the WC 7 Sprint in Pokljuka; it also was her first podium

First World Cup podium

- Irina Starykh (RUS), 26, in her 2nd season — no. 3 in the WC 2 Sprint in Hochfilzen
- Juliya Dzhyma (UKR), 23, in her 3rd season — no. 2 in the WC 2 Pursuit in Hochfilzen
- Tiril Eckhoff (NOR), 23, in her 3rd season — no. 3 in the WC 3 Pursuit in Annecy-Le Grand Bornand
- Alexey Volkov (RUS), 25, in his 5th season — no. 2 in the WC 4 Mass start in Oberhof
- Jean-Guillaume Béatrix (FRA), 25, in his 6th season — no. 2 in the WC 6 Pursuit in Antholz-Anterselva
- Daria Virolaynen (RUS), 25, in her 1st season — no. 2 in the WC 7 Sprint in Pokljuka
- Dorothea Wierer (ITA), 23, in her 4th season — no. 3 in the WC 7 Pursuit in Pokljuka
- Mari Laukkanen (FIN), 26, in her 7th season — no. 3 in the WC 8 Sprint in Kontiolahti
- Lowell Bailey (USA), 32, in his 10th season — no. 3 in the WC 8 Sprint (2) in Kontiolahti
- Susan Dunklee (USA), 28, in her 3rd season — no. 3 in the WC 9 Sprint in Holmenkollen

Victory in this World Cup (all-time number of victories in parentheses)

Men

- Martin Fourcade (FRA), 5 (29) first places
- Johannes Thingnes Bø (NOR), 5 (5) first places
- Emil Hegle Svendsen (NOR), 4 (35) first places
- Björn Ferry (SWE), 2 (7) first places
- Simon Schempp (GER), 2 (2) first places
- Lars Berger (NOR), 1 (7) first place
- Anton Shipulin (RUS), 1 (5) first place
- Jakov Fak (SLO), 1 (4) first place
- Simon Eder (AUT), 1 (2) first place
- Lukas Hofer (ITA), 1 (1) first place

Women

- Darya Domracheva (BLR), 4 (16) first places
- Kaisa Mäkäräinen (FIN), 4 (9) first places
- Gabriela Soukalová (CZE), 3 (7) first places
- Anastasiya Kuzmina (SVK), 2 (6) first places
- Selina Gasparin (SUI), 2 (2) first places
- Tora Berger (NOR), 1 (28) first place
- Andrea Henkel (GER), 1 (22) first place
- Ann Kristin Flatland (NOR), 1 (2) first place
- Synnøve Solemdal (NOR), 1 (2) first place
- Valj Semerenko (UKR), 1 (1) first place
- Anaïs Bescond (FRA), 1 (1) first place
- Katharina Innerhofer (AUT), 1 (1) first place

== Retirements ==
Following notable biathletes announced their retirement during or after the 2013–14 season:

Men

- Christoph Sumann (AUT)
- Evgeny Abramenko (BLR)
- Vladimir Alenishko (BLR)
- Sergey Novikov (BLR)
- Jean-Philippe Leguellec (CAN)
- Zdeněk Vítek (CZE)
- Daniil Steptšenko (EST)
- Markus Windisch (ITA)
- Hidenori Isa (JPN)
- Edgars Piksons (LAT)
- Rune Brattsveen (NOR)
- Andrei Makoveev (RUS)
- Maxim Tchoudov (RUS)
- Evgeny Ustyugov (RUS)
- Claudio Böckli (SUI)
- Simon Hallenbarter (SUI)
- Pavol Hurajt (SVK)
- Carl Johan Bergman (SWE)
- Björn Ferry (SWE)
- Olexander Bilanenko (UKR)
- Andriy Deryzemlya (UKR)
- Roman Pryma (UKR)
- Jay Hakkinen (USA)
- Jeremy Teela (USA)

Women

- Laure Soulie (AND)
- Iris Schwabl (AUT)
- Romana Schrempf (AUT)
- Liudmila Kalinchik (BLR)
- Megan Imrie (CAN)
- Claire Breton (FRA)
- Marie-Laure Brunet (FRA)
- Teija Lehtimaki (FIN)
- Andrea Henkel (GER)
- Kathrin Lang (GER)
- Adele Walker (GBR)
- Michela Ponza (ITA)
- Yuki Nakajima (JPN)
- Tora Berger (NOR)
- Ann Kristin Flatland (NOR)
- Paulina Bobak (POL)
- Agnieszka Cyl (POL)
- Ekaterina Iourieva (RUS)
- Marina Korovina (RUS)
- Valentina Nazarova (RUS)
- Jenny Jonsson (SWE)
- Elin Mattsson (SWE)
- Emelie Larsson (SWE)
- Asa Lif (SWE)
- Anna Karin Strömstedt (SWE)
- Patricia Jost (SUI)
- Inna Suprun (UKR)
- Lanny Barnes (USA)
- Tracey Barnes (USA)
- Haley Johnson (USA)
- Sara Studebaker (USA)
