= 2013–14 Biathlon World Cup – Mixed Relay =

The 2013–14 Biathlon World Cup – Mixed Relay started at Sunday November 24, 2013 in Östersund and finished in 2014.

== Competition format ==
The relay teams consist of four biathletes. Legs 1 and 2 are done by the women, legs 3 and 4 by the men. The women's legs are 6 km and men's legs are 7.5 km. Every athlete's leg is skied over three laps, with two shooting rounds; one prone, one standing. For every round of five targets there are eight bullets available, though the last three can only be single-loaded manually one at a time from spare round holders or bullets deposited by the competitor into trays or onto the mat at the firing line. If after eight bullets there are still misses, one 150 m penalty loop must be taken for each missed target remaining. The first-leg participants all start at the same time, and as in cross-country skiing relays, every athlete of a team must touch the team's next-leg participant to perform a valid changeover. On the first shooting stage of the first leg, the participant must shoot in the lane corresponding to their bib number (bib #10 shoots at lane #10 regardless of their position in the race), then for the remainder of the relay, the athletes shoot at the lane in the position they arrived (arrive at the range in 5th place, shoot at lane five).

== Medal winners ==
Event:	Gold:	Time	Silver:	Time	Bronze:	Time
Östersund details	Czech Republic; Veronika Vítková; Gabriela Soukalová; Zdeněk Vítek; Ondřej Moravec	1:17:05.6 (0+1) (0+1) (0+1) (0+0) (0+0) (0+2) (0+2) (0+1)	Norway; Tora Berger; Synnøve Solemdal; Vetle Sjåstad Christiansen; Tarjei Bø	1:17:15.8 (1+3) (0+0) (0+3) (0+2) (0+1) (0+0) (0+1) (0+2)	Ukraine; Olena Pidhrushna; Valj Semerenko; Serhiy Semenov; Andriy Deryzemlya	1:18:16.8 (0+2) (0+3) (0+2) (0+1) (0+0) (0+0) (0+1) (0+3)
Sochi details	Norway; Tora Berger; Tiril Eckhoff; Ole Einar Bjørndalen; Emil Hegle Svendsen	1:09:17.0 (0+0) (0+2) (0+0) (0+0) (0+0) (0+0) (0+0) (0+0)	Czech Republic; Veronika Vítková; Gabriela Soukalová; Jaroslav Soukup; Ondřej Moravec	1:09:49.6 (0+0) (0+1) (0+3) (0+0) (0+1) (0+1) (0+0) (0+1)	Italy; Dorothea Wierer; Karin Oberhofer; Dominik Windisch; Lukas Hofer	1:10:15.2 (0+0) (0+1) (0+0) (0+1) (0+1) (0+3) (0+0) (0+0)

== Standings ==
#	Name	ÖST	OLY	Total
1	Czech Republic	60	54	114
1	Norway	54	60	114
3	Italy	43	48	91
4	Ukraine	48	36	84
5	Russia	38	43	81
6	France	40	38	78
7	Slovakia	27	40	67
8	Belarus	34	31	65
9	United States	29	34	63
10	Austria	31	32	63
11	Canada	30	30	60
12	Switzerland	24	29	53
13	Poland	21	28	49
14	Kazakhstan	19	27	46
15	Estonia	18	26	44
16	Germany	36	DSQ	36
17	Slovenia	32	—	32
18	Sweden	28	—	28
19	Lithuania	26	—	26
20	Finland	25	—	25
21	Romania	23	—	23
22	Japan	22	—	22
23	Bulgaria	20	—	20
24	Latvia	17	—	17
25	China	16	—	16
26	South Korea	15	—	15
