= 2013–14 Biathlon World Cup – World Cup 8 =

The 2013–14 Biathlon World Cup – World Cup 8 was held in Kontiolahti, Finland, from March 13 until March 16, 2014. A planned mixed relay event was cancelled and replaced with second sprint events for both men and women. The IBU requested the change to keep the number of individual events unchanged after pursuit events were stopped and cancelled due to weather in World Cup 1 in Östersund.

== Schedule of events ==
Date	Time	Events
13 March	15:10 CET	Men's 10 km Sprint
13 March	17:45 CET	Women's 7.5 km Sprint
15 March	12:15 CET	Men's 10 km Sprint
15 March	14:45 CET	Women's 7.5 km Sprint
16 March	10:45 CET	Men's 12.5 km Pursuit
16 March	12:15 CET	Women's 10 km Pursuit

== Medal winners ==
=== Men ===
Event:	Gold:	Time	Silver:	Time	Bronze:	Time
10 km Sprint details	Johannes Thingnes Bø; Norway	23:33.2 (0+0)	Martin Fourcade; France	23:40.3 (0+0)	Arnd Peiffer; Germany	23:40.4 (1+0)
10 km Sprint details	Johannes Thingnes Bø; Norway	24:03.5 (0+0)	Lowell Bailey; United States	24:22.9 (0+0)	Ondrej Moravec; Czech Republic	24:23.2 (0+0)
12.5 km Pursuit details	Johannes Thingnes Bø; Norway	33:37.1 (0+0+1+4)	Martin Fourcade; France	33:53.4 (0+0+2+1)	Björn Ferry; Sweden	33:57.5 (0+0+1+2)

=== Women ===
Event:	Gold:	Time	Silver:	Time	Bronze:	Time
7.5 km Sprint details	Kaisa Mäkäräinen; Finland	20:36.3 (0+1)	Olga Zaitseva; Russia	20:42.4 (0+0)	Mari Laukkanen; Finland	20:59.0 (0+0)
7.5 km Sprint details	Kaisa Mäkäräinen; Finland	20:53.6 (1+0)	Tora Berger; Norway	20:59.8 (0+0)	Gabriela Soukalová; Czech Republic	21:06.5 (0+0)
10 km Pursuit details	Kaisa Mäkäräinen; Finland	30:52:0 (1+0+1+0)	Darya Domracheva; Belarus	31:52.0 (0+0+0+1)	Olga Zaitseva; Russia	32:46.3 (4+0+0+1)

== Achievements ==
Best performance for all time

- Mari Laukkanen (FIN), 3rd place in Sprint

First World Cup race
