= 2013–14 Biathlon World Cup – World Cup 5 =

The 2013–14 Biathlon World Cup – World Cup 5 was held in Ruhpolding, Germany, from January 8 until January 12, 2014.

== Schedule of events ==
Date	Time	Events
8 January	14:30 CET	Women's 4x6 km Relay
9 January	14:30 CET	Men's 4x7.5 km Relay
10 January	14:15 CET	Women's 15 km Individual
11 January	12:45 CET	Men's 20 km Individual
12 January	11:15 CET	Women's 10 km Pursuit
12 January	13:25 CET	Men's 12.5 km Pursuit

== Medal winners ==
=== Men ===
Event:	Gold:	Time	Silver:	Time	Bronze:	Time
4x7.5 km Relay details	Austria; Christoph Sumann; Daniel Mesotitsch; Simon Eder; Dominik Landertinger	1:15:40.9 (0+0) (0+2) (0+2) (0+2) (0+1) (0+0) (0+1) (0+0)	Germany; Christoph Stephan; Andreas Birnbacher; Erik Lesser; Simon Schempp	1:15:41.0 (0+0) (0+3) (0+1) (0+0) (0+0) (0+3) (0+1) (0+1)	Russia; Alexey Volkov; Evgeny Ustyugov; Dmitry Malyshko; Anton Shipulin	1:15:55.8 (0+0) (0+1) (0+1) (0+0) (0+2) (0+1) (0+2) (0+0)
20 km Individual details	Emil Hegle Svendsen; Norway	48:58.5 (1+0+0+0)	Alexey Volkov; Russia	49:13.1 (0+0+0+0)	Evgeny Ustyugov; Russia	49:15.0 (0+1+0+0)
12.5 km Pursuit details	Emil Hegle Svendsen; Norway	32:38.2 (0+0+0+0)	Jakov Fak; Slovenia	32:56.2 (0+0+0+0)	Evgeniy Garanichev; Russia	32:59.6 (1+0+0+0)

=== Women ===
Event:	Gold:	Time	Silver:	Time	Bronze:	Time
4x6 km Relay details	Germany; Franziska Preuß; Evi Sachenbacher-Stehle; Laura Dahlmeier; Franziska Hildebrand	1:09:48.4 (1+3) (0+1) (0+0) (0+1) (0+0) (0+0) (0+0) (0+0)	Norway; Tiril Eckhoff; Ann-Kristin Flatland; Synnøve Solemdal; Tora Berger	1:09:58.9 (0+2) (2+3) (0+0) (0+1) (0+0) (0+0) (0+1) (0+1)	Ukraine; Juliya Dzhyma; Vita Semerenko; Natalya Burdyga; Valj Semerenko	1:10:19.9 (0+1) (0+0) (0+0) (0+1) (0+1) (0+2) (0+0) (0+0)
15 km Individual details	Gabriela Soukalová; Czech Republic	40:32.6 (0+1+0+0)	Darya Domracheva; Belarus	41:06.9 (0+0+0+2)	Veronika Vítková; Czech Republic	41:11.2 (0+0+0+0)
10 km Pursuit details	Gabriela Soukalová; Czech Republic	30:39.8 (0+0+0+0)	Tora Berger; Norway	30:49.5 (1+0+0+0)	Kaisa Mäkäräinen; Finland	31:18.7 (2+0+0+1)

== Achievements ==
Best performance for all time

- Tobias Arwidson (SWE), 17th place in Individual
- Anton Pantov (KAZ), 31st place in Individual
- Kalev Ermits (EST), 54th place in Individual
- Franziska Hildebrand (GER), 4th place in Individual
- Franziska Preuß (GER), 4th place in Pursuit
- Laure Soulie (AND), 9th place in Individual
- Fuyuko Suzuki (JPN), 13th place in Individual
- Lisa Theresa Hauser (AUT), 24th place in Individual
- Åsa Lif (SWE), 36th place in Individual
- Natália Prekopová (SVK), 43rd place in Individual
- Aita Gasparin (SUI), 46th place in Individual
- Annukka Siltakorpi (FIN), 75th place in Individual
