= 2013–14 Biathlon World Cup – World Cup 6 =

The 2013–14 Biathlon World Cup – World Cup 6 was held in Antholz, Italy, from January 16 until January 19, 2014.

== Schedule of events ==
Date	Time	Events
16 January	14:30 CET	Women's 7.5 km Sprint
17 January	14:50 CET	Men's 10 km Sprint
18 January	11:45 CET	Women's 10 km Pursuit
18 January	14:30 CET	Men's 12.5 km Pursuit
19 January	11:45 CET	Women's 4x6 km Relay
19 January	14:15 CET	Men's 4x7.5 km Relay

== Medal winners ==
=== Men ===
Event:	Gold:	Time	Silver:	Time	Bronze:	Time
10 km Sprint details	Simon Schempp; Germany; Lukas Hofer; Italy	24:44.9 (0+0); 24:44.9 (0+1)	–	–	Arnd Peiffer; Germany	24:49.2 (0+0)
12.5 km Pursuit details	Simon Schempp; Germany	31:20.6 (1+0+1+0)	Jean-Guillaume Béatrix; France	31:22.1 (0+0+0+1)	Henrik L'Abée-Lund; Norway	31:25.4 (0+0+2+0)
4x7.5 km Relay details	France; Simon Fourcade; Alexis Bœuf; Jean-Guillaume Béatrix; Martin Fourcade	1:14:34.1 (0+0) (0+2) (0+2) (0+0) (0+0) (0+0) (0+0) (0+0)	Sweden; Tobias Arwidson; Björn Ferry; Fredrik Lindström; Carl Johan Bergman	1:14:36.7 (1+3) (0+1) (0+0) (0+0) (0+0) (0+1) (0+0) (0+0)	Germany; Erik Lesser; Andreas Birnbacher; Arnd Peiffer; Simon Schempp	1:15:12.9 (0+1) (0+2) (0+1) (1+3) (0+0) (0+1) (0+2) (0+0)

=== Women ===
Event:	Gold:	Time	Silver:	Time	Bronze:	Time
7.5 km Sprint details	Anaïs Bescond; France	20:30.2 (0+1)	Andrea Henkel; Germany	20:36.9 (0+0)	Darya Domracheva; Belarus	20:40.3 (0+2)
10 km Pursuit details	Andrea Henkel; Germany	31:04.5 (0+0+0+0)	Nadezhda Skardino; Belarus	31:06.1 (0+0+0+0)	Tora Berger; Norway	31:11.1 (1+0+2+0)
4x6 km Relay details	Suspended due to poor visibility due to dense fog.					

== Achievements ==
Best performance for all time

- Simon Schempp (GER), 1st place in Sprint
- Lukas Hofer (ITA), 1st place in Sprint
- Jean-Guillaume Béatrix (FRA), 2nd place in Pursuit
- Krasimir Anev (BUL), 7th place in Pursuit
- Brendan Green (CAN), 8th place in Sprint
- Quentin Fillon Maillet (FRA), 14th place in Pursuit
- Tomáš Krupčík (CZE), 25th place in Sprint
- Anaïs Bescond (FRA), 1st place in Sprint
- Nadezhda Skardino (BLR), 2nd place in Pursuit
- Jitka Landová (CZE), 27th place in Sprint
- Galina Nechkasova (RUS), 31st place in Pursuit
- Vanessa Hinz (GER), 41st place in Pursuit
- Federica Sanfilippo (ITA), 42nd place in Pursuit
- Chardine Sloof (NED), 44th place in Sprint
- Natassia Kalina (BLR), 64th place in Sprint

First World Cup race

- Artem Tyshchenko (UKR), 90th place in Sprint
- Aleksandrs Patrijuks (LAT), 100th place in Sprint
- Olga Abramova (UKR), 54th place in Sprint
- Federica Sanfilippo (ITA), 55th place in Sprint
- Galina Nechkasova (RUS), 59th place in Sprint
- Iryna Varvynets (UKR), 62nd place in Sprint
- Gaudvile Nalivaikaite (LTU), 97th place in Sprint
