= 2013–14 Biathlon World Cup – World Cup 1 =

The 2013–14 Biathlon World Cup – World Cup 1 is the opening event of the season and is held in Östersund, Sweden, from 24 November until 1 December 2013.

== Schedule of events ==
Date	Time	Events
November 24	15:30 CET	Mixed Relay
November 28	13:15 CET	Women's 15 km Individual *
November 28	17:15 CET	Men's 20 km Individual
November 29	17:45 CET	Women's 7.5 km Sprint
November 30	15:15 CET	Men's 10 km Sprint
December 1	11:30 CET	Women's 10 km Pursuit
December 1	13:30 CET	Men's 12.5 km Pursuit

- The Women's 15 km Individual was postponed from November 27 17:15 CET to November 28 due to bad weather.

== Medal winners ==
=== Men ===
Event:	Gold:	Time	Silver:	Time	Bronze:	Time
20 km Individual details	Martin Fourcade; France	50:10.9 (0+0+0+0)	Simon Eder; Austria	52:17.0 (0+0+0+1)	Daniel Mesotitsch; Austria	52:31.1 (1+0+0+0)
10 km Sprint details	Martin Fourcade; France	25:56.0 (0+1)	Fredrik Lindström; Sweden	26:02.5 (0+0)	Tim Burke; United States	26:27.3 (0+0)
12.5 km Pursuit details	Cancelled					

=== Women ===
Event:	Gold:	Time	Silver:	Time	Bronze:	Time
15 km Individual details	Gabriela Soukalová; Czech Republic	47:56.0 (0+1+1+0)	Anastasiya Kuzmina; Slovakia	47:57.2 (0+2+0+0)	Marie Laure Brunet; France	48:12.2 (0+0+0+1)
7.5 km Sprint details	Ann Kristin Flatland; Norway	20:41.2 (0+0)	Olga Zaitseva; Russia	20:57.1 (0+0)	Tora Berger; Norway	21:03.2 (1+0)
10 km Pursuit details	Cancelled					

=== Mixed ===
Event:	Gold:	Time	Silver:	Time	Bronze:	Time
2 x 6 km + 2 x 7.5 km Relay details	Czech Republic; Veronika Vítková; Gabriela Soukalová; Zdeněk Vítek; Ondřej Moravec	1:17:05.6 (0+1) (0+1) (0+1) (0+0) (0+0) (0+2) (0+2) (0+1)	Norway; Tora Berger; Synnøve Solemdal; Vetle Sjåstad Christiansen; Tarjei Bø	1:17:15.8 (1+3) (0+0) (0+3) (0+2) (0+1) (0+0) (0+1) (0+2)	Ukraine; Olena Pidhrushna; Valj Semerenko; Serhiy Semenov; Andriy Deryzemlya	1:18:16.8 (0+2) (0+3) (0+2) (0+1) (0+0) (0+0) (0+1) (0+3)

== Achievements ==
Best performance for all time

- Milanko Petrović (SRB), 31st place in Sprint
- Cornel Puchianu (ROU), 48th place in Sprint
- Tiril Eckhoff (NOR), 5th place in Individual
- Dorothea Wierer (ITA), 8th place in Individual
- Kadri Lehtla (EST), 15th place in Individual
- Barbora Tomesova (CZE), 20th place in Individual
- Hilde Fenne (NOR), 21st place in Individual
- Katharina Innerhofer (AUT), 33rd place in Individual
- Grete Gaim (EST), 39th place in Individual
- Sanna Markkanen (FIN), 52nd place in Individual
- Irina Starykh (RUS), 5th place in Sprint
- Franziska Preuß (GER), 27th place in Sprint

First World Cup race

- Mona Brorsson (SWE), 40th place in Individual
- Franziska Preuß (GER), 44th place in Individual
- Anja Erzen (SLO), 54th place in Individual
- Yurie Tanaka (JPN), 81st place in Individual
