= 2013–14 Biathlon World Cup – World Cup 7 =

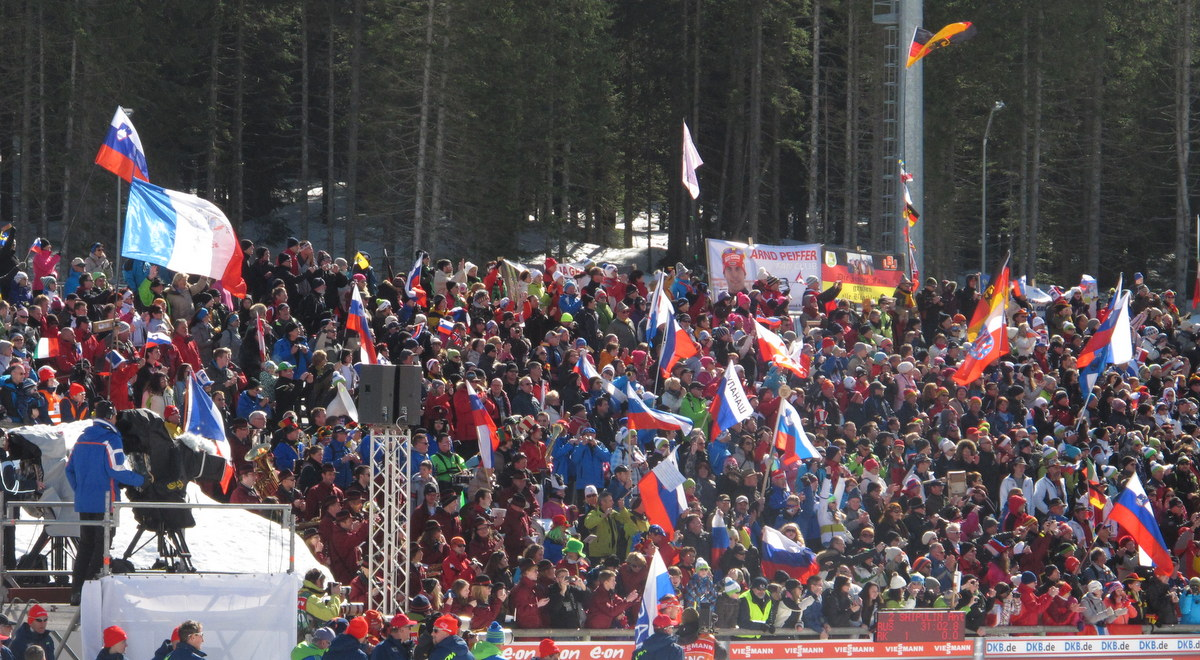
Pokljuka Biathlon World Cup 2014

The 2013–14 Biathlon World Cup – World Cup 7 is held in Pokljuka, Slovenia, from March 6 until March 9, 2014.

== Schedule of events ==
Date	Time	Events
6 March	12:30 CET	Men's 10 km Sprint
6 March	15:30 CET	Women's 7.5 km Sprint
8 March	11:25 CET	Men's 12.5 km Pursuit
8 March	13:25 CET	Women's 10 km Pursuit
9 March	11:15 CET	Men 15 km Mass Start
9 March	13:25 CET	Women 12.5 km Mass Start

== Medal winners ==
=== Men ===
Event:	Gold:	Time	Silver:	Time	Bronze:	Time
10 km Sprint details	Björn Ferry; Sweden	25:03.5 (0+1)	Anton Shipulin; Russia	25:05.0 (0+0)	Arnd Peiffer; Germany	25:06.2 (0+1)
12.5 km Pursuit details	Anton Shipulin; Russia	31:02.8 (1+0+0+0)	Björn Ferry; Sweden	31:11.4 (1+1+0+0)	Ole Einar Bjørndalen; Norway	31:30.2 (0+1+0+1)
15 km Mass Start details	Björn Ferry; Sweden	35:19.3 (0+0+0+0)	Martin Fourcade; France	35:24.0 (0+0+0+0)	Evgeny Ustyugov; Russia	35:31.8 (0+0+0+0)

=== Women ===
Event:	Gold:	Time	Silver:	Time	Bronze:	Time
7.5 km Sprint details	Katharina Innerhofer; Austria	21:19.1 (0+0)	Daria Virolaynen; Russia	21:28.3 (0+0)	Nadezhda Skardino; Belarus	21:31.2 (0+0)
10 km Pursuit details	Kaisa Mäkäräinen; Finland	32:01.0 (0+0+1+1)	Tora Berger; Norway	32:20.7 (1+0+1+0)	Dorothea Wierer; Italy	32:55.5 (1+0+2+0)
12.5 km Mass Start details	Darya Domracheva; Belarus	36:16.4 (0+1+0+1)	Kaisa Mäkäräinen; Finland	36:38.6 (0+1+1+0)	Olga Zaitseva; Russia	36:52.3 (0+0+1+0)

== Achievements ==
Best performance for all time

- Aliaksandr Darozhka (BLR), 27th place in Sprint
- Damir Rastić (SRB), 57th place in Pursuit
- Gaspard Cuenot (SUI), 70th place in Sprint
- Xuezhi Li (CHN), 80th place in Sprint
- Darko Damjanovski (MKD), 88th place in Sprint
- Katharina Innerhofer (AUT), 1st place in Sprint
- Daria Virolaynen (RUS), 2nd place in Sprint
- Mari Laukkanen (FIN), 9th place in Sprint
- Marte Olsbu (NOR), 10th place in Sprint
- Nicole Gontier (ITA), 15thplace in Sprint
- Irene Cadurisch (SUI), 19th place in Sprint
- Victoria Padial (ESP), 20th place in Sprint
- Aita Gasparin (SUI), 38th place in Pursuit
- Lea Johanidesová (CZE), 42nd place in Sprint
- Nastassia Kalina (BLR), 50th place in Pursuit

First World Cup race
