= Nadezhda Skardino =

Belarusian biathlete (born 1985)

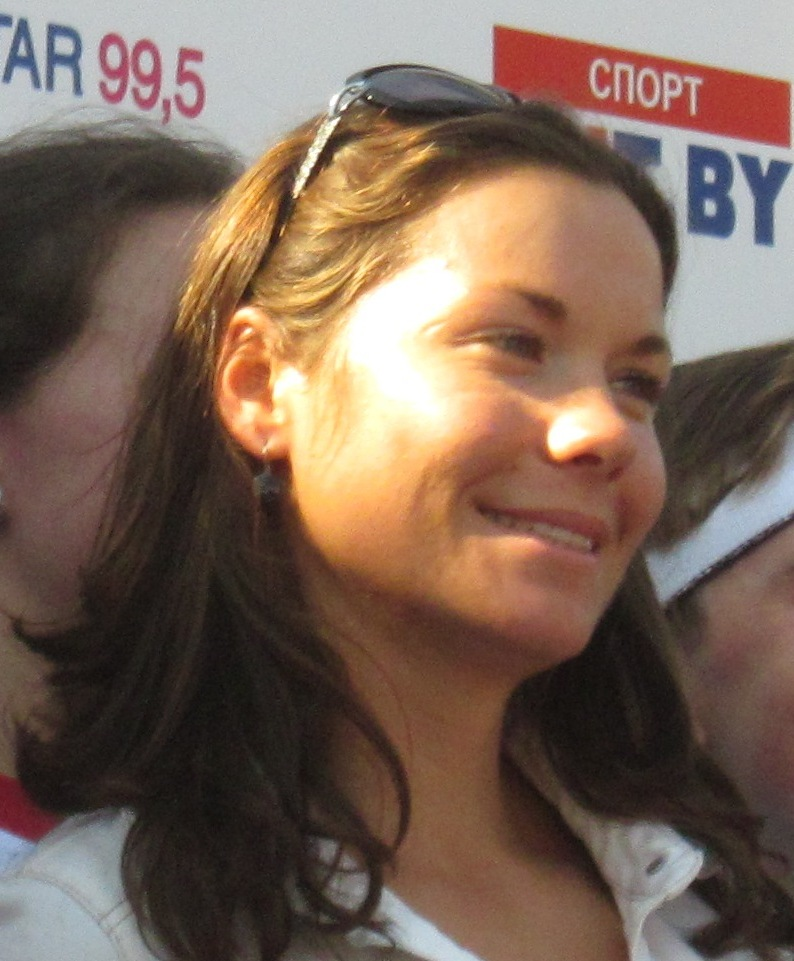
- Skardino in 2014

Personal information
- Full name: Nadzieja Walerjeuna Skardzina
- Born: 27 March 1985 (age 41) Leningrad, Soviet Union
- Height: 1.60 m (5 ft 3 in)
- Weight: 48 kg (106 lb)

Sport
- Sport: Biathlon
- Club: Dynamo Minsk
Medal record
Representing Belarus
Olympic Games
Gold medal – first place	2018 Pyeongchang	4 × 6 km relay
Bronze medal – third place	2014 Sochi	15 km individual
World Championships
Bronze medal – third place	2011 Khanty-Mansiysk	4 × 6 km relay
European Championships
Gold medal – first place	2016 Tyumen	10 km pursuit
Bronze medal – third place	2007 Bansko	4 x 6 km relay

Nadezhda Valeryevna Skardino (Belarusian: Надзея Валер'еўна Скардзіна, romanized: Nadzieja Walerjeuna Skardzina; born 27 March 1985) is a retired Belarusian biathlete. She represented Belarus at the 2010 Winter Olympics in Vancouver, the 2014 Winter Olympics in Sochi and the 2018 Winter Olympics in Pyeongchang. She won a bronze medal in the individual competition at the 2014 Winter Olympics. She won a gold medal in the 4×6 km relay at the 2018 Olympics In the 2017–2018 season Skardino won the Individual World Cup.

== World Cup ==
Season	Overall			Sprint			Pursuit			Individual			Mass Start		
Season	Races	Points	Position	Races	Points	Position	Races	Points	Position	Races	Points	Position	Races	Points	Position
2011/12	22/26	159	40th	10/10	79	40th	8/8	25	52nd	3/3	35	28th	1/5	20	41st
2012/13	26/26	478	18th	10/10	182	17th	8/8	163	19th	3/3	44	22nd	5/5	90	22nd
2013/14	15/22	397	17th	8/9	161	17th	4/8	128	22nd	2/2	72	4th	1/3	36	29th
2014/15	20/25	442	18th	10/10	167	16th	4/7	102	26th	3/3	89	5th	3/5	84	21st
2015/16	19/25	411	20th	6/9	72	32nd	5/7	117	22nd	3/3	93	9th	4/5	129	11th
2016/17	24/26	440	18th	8/9	129	23rd	8/9	147	24th	2/3	49	21st	5/5	115	14th
2017/18	16/22	396	18th	7/8	110	22nd	4/7	108	23rd	2/2	96	1st	3/5	82	21st
