= 2013–14 Biathlon World Cup – World Cup 3 =

The 2013–14 Biathlon World Cup – World Cup 3 was held in Annecy-Le Grand Bornand, France, from 12 December until 15 December 2013.

== Schedule of events ==
Date	Time	Events
12 December	14:30 CET	Women's 4x6 km Relay
13 December	13:30 CET	Men's 4x7.5 km Relay
14 December	10:30 CET	Women's 7.5 km Sprint
14 December	13:15 CET	Men's 10 km Sprint
15 December	11:15 CET	Women's 10 km Pursuit
15 December	13:25 CET	Men's 12.5 km Pursuit

== Medal winners ==
=== Men ===
Event:	Gold:	Time	Silver:	Time	Bronze:	Time
4x7.5 km Relay details	Russia; Ivan Tcherezov; Alexandr Loginov; Evgeniy Garanichev; Anton Shipulin	1:14:01.8 (0+0) (0+2) (0+0) (0+2) (0+0) (0+1) (0+0) (0+0)	Germany; Erik Lesser; Andreas Birnbacher; Arnd Peiffer; Simon Schempp	1:14:02.1 (0+0) (0+2) (0+1) (0+0) (0+0) (0+1) (0+0) (0+1)	Austria; Christoph Sumann; Daniel Mesotitsch; Dominik Landertinger; Simon Eder	1:14:28.6 (0+0) (0+1) (0+0) (0+2) (0+0) (0+1) (0+0) (0+3)
10 km Sprint details	Johannes Thingnes Bø; Norway	22:06.7 (0+0)	Ondřej Moravec; Czech Republic	22:39.6 (0+0)	Martin Fourcade; France	22:43.8 (0+1)
12.5 km Pursuit details	Johannes Thingnes Bø; Norway	31:43.7 (0+1+0+0)	Erik Lesser; Germany	32:21.2 (0+0+0+0)	Anton Shipulin; Russia	32:22.8 (0+0+1+0)

=== Women ===
Event:	Gold:	Time	Silver:	Time	Bronze:	Time
4x6 km Relay details	Germany; Franziska Preuß; Andrea Henkel; Franziska Hildebrand; Laura Dahlmeier	1:06:27.8 (0+1) (0+1) (0+0) (0+0) (0+0) (0+1) (0+0) (0+0)	Ukraine; Juliya Dzhyma; Vita Semerenko; Valj Semerenko; Olena Pidhrushna	1:06:51.1 (0+0) (0+3) (0+0) (0+1) (0+0) (0+0) (0+0) (0+0)	Norway; Tiril Eckhoff; Fanny Welle-Strand Horn; Synnøve Solemdal; Tora Berger	1:06:51.6 (0+1) (0+2) (0+1) (0+2) (0+1) (0+1) (0+0) (0+2)
7.5 km Sprint details	Selina Gasparin; Switzerland	20:51.4 (0+0)	Kaisa Mäkäräinen; Finland	20:59.7 (0+1)	Valj Semerenko; Ukraine	21:02.9 (0+1)
10 km Pursuit details	Valj Semerenko; Ukraine	28:05.4 (1+0+0+0)	Irina Starykh; Russia	28:09.6 (0+0+0+0)	Tiril Eckhoff; Norway	28:20.9 (0+0+1+0)

== Achievements ==
Best performance for all time

- Johannes Thingnes Bø (NOR), 1st place in Sprint
- Michal Krcmar (CZE), 24th place in Sprint
- Tomáš Hasilla (SVK), 32nd place in Sprint
- Simon Kocevar (SLO), 61st place in Sprint
- Grzegorz Guzik (POL), 101st place in Sprint
- Quentin Fillon Maillet (FRA), 37th place in Pursuit
- Franziska Preuß (GER), 6th place in Sprint
- Réka Ferencz (ROU), 18th place in Sprint
- Eva Puskarčíková (CZE), 25th place in Sprint
- Desislava Stoyaniva (BUL), 27th place in Sprint
- Galina Vishnevskaya (KAZ), 36th place in Sprint
- Darya Yurlova (EST), 39th place in Sprint
- Aita Gasparin (SUI), 83rd place in Sprint
- Laura Dahlmeier (GER), 5th place in Pursuit

First World Cup race

- Quentin Fillon Maillet (FRA), 55th place in Sprint
- Lisa Theresa Hauser (AUT), 33rd place in Sprint
- Lucie Charvatova (CZE), 70th place in Sprint
- Ivova Fialkova (SVK), 88th place in Sprint
- Karolina Batozynska (POL), 89th place in Sprint
