= 2013–14 Biathlon World Cup – World Cup 4 =

The 2013–14 Biathlon World Cup – World Cup 4 was held in Oberhof, Germany, from January 3 until January 5, 2014.

== Schedule of events ==
Date	Time	Events
3 January	15:15 CET	Men's 10 km Sprint
3 January	18:00 CET	Women's 7.5 km Sprint
4 January	12:30 CET	Men's 12.5 km Pursuit
4 January	17:00 CET	Women's 10 km Pursuit
5 January	12:45 CET	Men's 15 km Mass Start
5 January	15:45 CET	Women's 12.5 km Mass Start

== Medal winners ==
=== Men ===
Event:	Gold:	Time	Silver:	Time	Bronze:	Time
10 km Sprint details	Emil Hegle Svendsen; Norway	26:44.3 (2+0)	Ole Einar Bjørndalen; Norway	26:44.7 (1+1)	Martin Fourcade; France	27:06.0 (0+3)
12.5 km Pursuit details	Emil Hegle Svendsen; Norway	34:47.7 (1+0+0+0)	Ole Einar Bjørndalen; Norway	35:23.3 (0+0+0+2)	Martin Fourcade; France	35:47.7 (0+0+1+1)
15 km Mass Start details	Martin Fourcade; France	37:39.4 (1+0+0+0)	Alexey Volkov; Russia	37:44.6 (0+0+0+0)	Tarjei Bø; Norway	37:58.4 (0+1+1+0)

=== Women ===
Event:	Gold:	Time	Silver:	Time	Bronze:	Time
7.5 km Sprint details	Darya Domracheva; Belarus	23:06.7 (0+1)	Kaisa Mäkäräinen; Finland	23:36.5 (0+2)	Olena Pidhrushna; Ukraine	23:43.1 (0+0)
10 km Pursuit details	Darya Domracheva; Belarus	33:35.8 (0+2+1+0)	Kaisa Mäkäräinen; Finland	34:10.4 (1+0+2+0)	Synnøve Solemdal; Norway	34:47.5 (0+1+1+0)
12.5 km Mass Start details	Tora Berger; Norway	37:59.0 (1+0+0+0)	Synnøve Solemdal; Norway	38:16.5 (0+0+0+0)	Darya Domracheva; Belarus	38:16.8 (0+0+1+1)

== Achievements ==
Best performance for all time

- Artem Pryma (UKR), 5th place in Sprint
- Kauri Kõiv (EST), 6th place in Sprint
- Kalev Ermits (EST), 68th place in Sprint
- Lenart Oblak (SLO), 69th place in Sprint
- Victor Lobo Escolar (ESP), 82nd place in Sprint
- Fangming Chen (CHN), 83rd place in Sprint
- Yonggyu Kim (KOR), 84th place in Sprint
- Simon Desthieux (FRA), 17th place in Pursuit and 13th in Mass Start
- Aliaksandr Darozhka (BLR), 39th place in Pursuit
- David Komatz (AUT), 56th place in Pursuit
- Alexey Volkov (RUS), 2nd place in Mass Start
- Anais Chevalier (FRA), 14th place in Sprint
- Natalija Kocergina (LTU), 30th place in Sprint
- Anja Eržen (SLO), 44th place in Sprint
- Sanna Markkanen (FIN), 45th place in Sprint
- Nastassia Kalina (BLR), 71st place in Sprint
- Ji-Ae Park (KOR), 88th place in Sprint

First World Cup race

- Macx Davies (CAN), 42nd place in Sprint
- Aliaksandr Darozhka (BLR), 46th place in Sprint
- Serafin Wiestener (SUI), 47th place in Sprint
- Simon Hallstroem (SWE), 51st place in Sprint
- David Komatz (AUT), 59th place in Sprint
- Dimitar Partalov (BUL), 73rd place in Sprint
- Dimitar Gerdzhikov (BUL), 81st place in Sprint
- Anton Sinapov (BUL), 86th place in Sprint
- Peppe Femling (SWE), 92nd place in Sprint
- Rayna Koyuva (BUL), 78th place in Sprint
- Jessica Jislova (CZE), 81st place in Sprint
- Julia Ransom (CAN), 82nd place in Sprint
- Emma Lodge (CAN), 83rd place in Sprint
- Ladina Meier-Ruge (SUI), 87th place in Sprint
