= 2013–14 Biathlon World Cup – World Cup 2 =

The 2013–14 Biathlon World Cup – World Cup 2 was held in Hochfilzen, Austria, from 6 December until 8 December 2013.

== Schedule of events ==
Date	Time	Events
6 December	10:30 CET	Women's 7.5 km Sprint
6 December	13:30 CET	Men's 10 km Sprint
7 December	11:30 CET	Women's 4x6 km Relay
7 December	14:30 CET	Men's 4x7.5 km Relay
9 December	11:30 CET	Women's 10 km Pursuit
9 December	13:30 CET	Men's 12.5 km Pursuit

== Medal winners ==
=== Men ===
Event:	Gold:	Time	Silver:	Time	Bronze:	Time
10 km Sprint details	Lars Berger; Norway	25:02.0 (0+2)	Martin Fourcade; France	25:15.6 (0+0)	Ole Einar Bjørndalen; Norway	25:17.3 (0+1)
4x7.5 km Relay details	Norway; Vetle Sjåstad Christiansen; Ole Einar Bjørndalen; Tarjei Bø; Emil Hegle Svendsen	1:19:50.8 (0+1) (0+3) (0+0) (0+2) (0+0) (0+3) (0+0) (0+1)	Sweden; Christoffer Eriksson; Björn Ferry; Fredrik Lindström; Carl Johan Bergman	1:20:10.1 (0+0) (0+3) (0+0) (0+0) (0+0) (0+1) (0+0) (0+1)	Russia; Alexey Volkov; Evgeny Ustyugov; Anton Shipulin; Dmitry Malyshko	1:20:11.9 (0+1) (0+0) (0+0) (0+2) (0+1) (0+2) (0+3) (0+1)
12.5 km Pursuit details	Martin Fourcade; France	32.43.3 (0+0+1+0)	Emil Hegle Svendsen; Norway	32.51.0 (0+0+1+0)	Tarjei Bø; Norway	33.00.9 (1+0+1+0)

=== Women ===
Event:	Gold:	Time	Silver:	Time	Bronze:	Time
7.5 km Sprint details	Selina Gasparin; Switzerland	23:16.9 (0+1)	Veronika Vítková; Czech Republic	23:18.1 (0+0)	Irina Starykh; Russia	23:19.0 (0+0)
4x6 km Relay details	Ukraine; Juliya Dzhyma; Vita Semerenko; Valj Semerenko; Olena Pidhrushna	1:13:09.2 (0+0) (0+0) (0+1) (0+0) (0+1) (0+1) (0+0) (0+0)	Germany; Franziska Preuß; Andrea Henkel; Franziska Hildebrand; Laura Dahlmeier	1:14:05.5 (0+1) (0+2) (0+1) (0+0) (0+0) (1+3) (0+0) (0+0)	France; Marie Laure Brunet; Sophie Boilley; Anais Chevalier; Anais Bescond	1:14:10.0 (0+0) (0+3) (0+0) (0+1) (0+1) (0+1) (0+0) (0+1)
10 km Pursuit details	Synnøve Solemdal; Norway	30:16.2 (1+0+0+0)	Juliya Dzhyma; Ukraine	30:27.7 (0+0+0+0)	Krystyna Pałka; Poland	30:31.3 (0+0+0+0)
