= 2013–14 Biathlon World Cup – World Cup 9 =

The 2013–14 Biathlon World Cup – World Cup 9 event was held in Holmenkollen, Norway, from March 20 until March 23, 2014.

== Schedule of events ==
Date	Time	Events
20 March	12:30 CET	Women's 7.5 km Sprint
20 March	15:30 CET	Men's 10 km Sprint
22 March	13:00 CET	Women's 10 km Pursuit
22 March	15:30 CET	Men's 12.5 km Pursuit
23 March	13:00 CET	Women 12.5 km Mass Start
23 March	15:30 CET	Men 15 km Mass Start

== Medal winners ==
=== Men ===
Event:	Gold:	Time	Silver:	Time	Bronze:	Time
10 km Sprint details	Jakov Fak; Slovenia	26:05.9 (0+1)	Evgeniy Garanichev; Russia	26:19.8 (0+0)	Björn Ferry; Sweden	26:20.2 (0+0)
12.5 km Pursuit details	Simon Eder; Austria	32:23.4 (0+0+0+0)	Björn Ferry; Sweden	32:44.1 (0+0+0+1)	Carl Johan Bergman; Sweden	33:04.5 (0+0+0+1)
15 km Mass Start details	Martin Fourcade; France	40:59.9 (0+0+1+0)	Dominik Landertinger; Austria	41:06.9 (0+0+0+0)	Jakov Fak; Slovenia	41:32.8 (0+0+1+1)

=== Women ===
Event:	Gold:	Time	Silver:	Time	Bronze:	Time
7.5 km Sprint details	Darya Domracheva; Belarus	22:18.8 (0+1)	Tora Berger; Norway	22:29.5 (0+0)	Susan Dunklee; United States	22:51.8 (0+0)
10 km Pursuit details	Anastasiya Kuzmina; Slovakia	30:29.1 (1+0+1+0)	Tora Berger; Norway	31:10.9 (1+1+2+0)	Olga Vilukhina; Russia	31:23.1 (0+0+2+0)
12.5 km Mass Start details	Anastasiya Kuzmina; Slovakia	39:44.8 (1+2+1+0)	Teja Gregorin; Slovenia	39:48.6 (0+0+1+1)	Marie Dorin Habert; France	39:53.1 (1+2+0+0)

== Achievements ==
Best performance for all time

First World Cup race
