= Tobias Arwidson =

Swedish biathlete (born 1988)

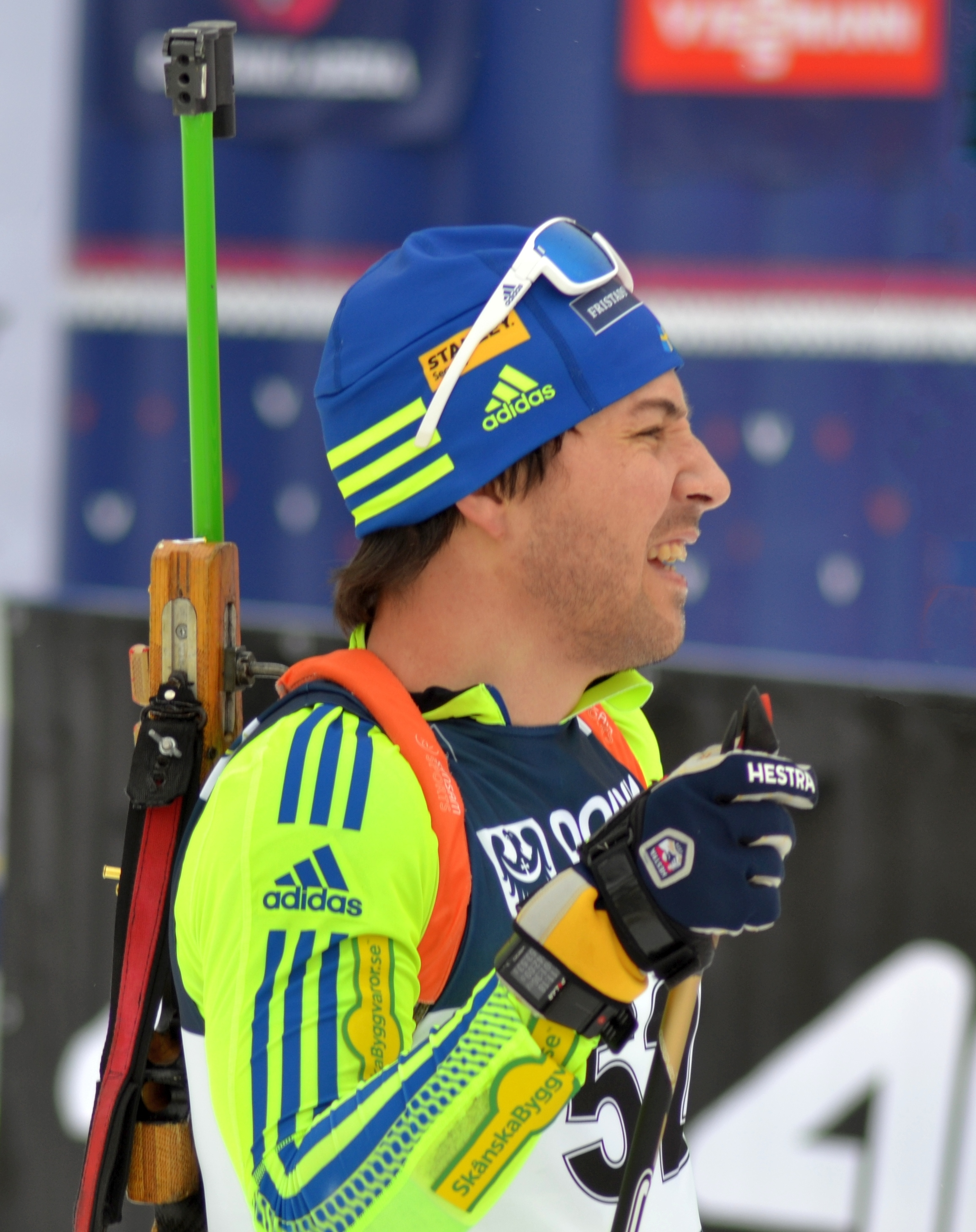

Personal information
- Born: June 7, 1988 Mora, Sweden
- Height: 5 ft 7 in (170 cm)

Sport
- Sport: Skiing
- Club: Lima SKG
Medal record
European Championships
Silver medal – second place	2013 Bansko	20 km individual
- Updated on February 10, 2014

Tobias Arwidson born on June 7, 1988 is a Swedish biathlete.

He competed in the 2014 Winter Olympics for Sweden where he finished 42nd in the sprint.

He is the son of Lars-Göran Arwidson.
