= Ann Kristin Flatland =

Norwegian biathlete (born 1982)

Personal information
- Full name: Ann Kristin Aafedt Flatland
- Born: 6 November 1982 (age 43) Oslo, Norway
- Height: 1.73 m (5 ft 8 in)

Sport
- Sport: Skiing
- Club: Vik IL

World Cup career
- Seasons: 2003–2014
- Indiv. podiums: 4
- Indiv. wins: 2
Medal record
Women's biathlon
Representing Norway
Olympic Games
Silver medal – second place	2014 Sochi	4 × 6 km relay
World Championships
Gold medal – first place	2011 Khanty-Mansiysk	Mixed relay
Gold medal – first place	2013 Nové Město	4 × 6 km relay
Silver medal – second place	2010 Khanty-Mansiysk	Mixed relay
Bronze medal – third place	2007 Anterselva	4 × 6 km relay
- Updated on 24 March 2014

Ann Kristin Aafedt Flatland (born 6 November 1982) is a retired Norwegian biathlete. Ann Kristin Aafedt Flatland debuted in the World Cup in 2003 at Kontiolahti in Finland, where she came in 56th in the sprint event. In the second world cup weekend in Hochfilzen she debuted on the Norwegian relay team which finished 5th. She has two individual World Cup victories. She represented Norway at the World Championship 2005 in Hochfilzen and came 22nd in the sprint and 37th in the pursuit.

Flatland retired from the sport at the end of the 2013–14 season.

== Record ==
=== Individual victories ===
Date	Event	Competition	Level
2011	(Germany) Oberhof	7.5 km Sprint	Biathlon World Cup
2013	(Sweden) Östersund	7.5 km Sprint	Biathlon World Cup
