= 2019–20 Biathlon World Cup – Sprint Women =

The 2019–20 Biathlon World Cup – Sprint Women started on 1 December 2019 in Östersund and will finished on 13 March 2020 in Kontiolahti. The defending champion Anastasiya Kuzmina retired after the 2018-19 season.

== Competition format ==
The 7.5 kilometres (4.7 mi) sprint race is the third oldest biathlon event; the distance is skied over three laps. The biathlete shoots two times at any shooting lane, first prone, then standing, totalling 10 targets. For each missed target the biathlete has to complete a penalty lap of around 150 metres (490 ft). Competitors' starts are staggered, normally by 30 seconds.

== 2018–19 Top 3 standings ==
Medal	Athlete	Points
Gold:	(Slovakia) Anastasiya Kuzmina	371
Silver:	(Italy) Dorothea Wierer	330
Bronze:	(Norway) Marte Olsbu Røiseland	326

== Medal winners ==
Event	Gold	Time	Silver	Time	Bronze	Time
Östersund details	Dorothea Wierer; Italy	19:48.5 (0+1)	Marte Olsbu Røiseland; Norway	19:57.1 (2+0)	Markéta Davidová; Czech Republic	20:00.4 (0+0)
Hochfilzen details	Dorothea Wierer; Italy	21:26.5 (1+0)	Ingrid Landmark Tandrevold; Norway	21:32.4 (0+0)	Svetlana Mironova; Russia	21:44.8 (0+1)
Le Grand-Bornand details	Tiril Eckhoff; Norway	20:27.0 (1+0)	Justine Braisaz; France	20:33.2 (0+0)	Markéta Davidová; Czech Republic	20:47.5 (0+0)
Oberhof details	Marte Olsbu Røiseland; Norway	22:04.9 (0+0)	Denise Herrmann; Germany	22:38.0 (0+1)	Julia Simon; France	22:52.3 (1+0)
Ruhpolding details	Tiril Eckhoff; Norway	18:55.5 (0+0)	Hanna Öberg; Sweden	19:25.2 (0+0)	Dorothea Wierer; Italy	19:32.3 (0+0)
World Championships details	Marte Olsbu Røiseland; Norway	21:13.1 (0+1)	Susan Dunklee; United States	21:19.9 (0+0)	Lucie Charvátová; Czech Republic	21:34.4 (1+0)
Nové Město details	Denise Herrmann; Germany	18:51.0 (0+0)	Anaïs Bescond; France	19:18.2 (0+0)	Markéta Davidová; Czech Republic	19:50.0 (1+0)
Kontiolahti details	Denise Herrmann; Germany	20:00.5 (0+1)	Franziska Preuß; Germany	20:20.6 (1+0)	Tiril Eckhoff; Norway	20:32.8 (1+1)
Oslo	Cancelled due to the coronavirus pandemic					

== Standings ==
#	Name	ÖST	HOC	LGB	OBE	RUH	ANT	NOV	KON	OSL	Total
1	Denise Herrmann (GER)	38	0	40	54	22	40	60	60	—	314
2	Dorothea Wierer (ITA)	60	60	19	43	48	36	17	22	—	305
3	Tiril Eckhoff (NOR)	1	34	60	40	60	0	40	48	—	283
4	Marte Olsbu Røiseland (NOR)	54	36	—	60	38	60	—	—	—	248
5	Hanna Öberg (SWE)	30	40	27	20	54	23	38	13	—	245
6	Franziska Preuß (GER)	43	0	29	—	27	34	28	54	—	215
7	Lisa Vittozzi (ITA)	0	18	26	21	32	38	36	43	—	214
8	Markéta Davidová (CZE)	48	6	48	18	0	4	48	40	—	212
9	Julia Simon (FRA)	24	23	34	48	36	0	16	30	—	211
10	Paulína Fialková (SVK)	0	43	31	38	40	25	14	0	—	191
11	Ingrid Landmark Tandrevold (NOR)	16	54	38	7	9	0	16	32	—	172
12	Justine Braisaz (FRA)	0	16	54	13	19	9	31	24	—	166
13	Lucie Charvátová (CZE)	11	38	20	0	26	48	2	18	—	163
14	Monika Hojnisz-Staręga (POL)	21	DNF	0	34	24	13	32	38	—	162
15	Elvira Öberg (SWE)	29	14	12	8	21	28	34	0	—	146
16	Svetlana Mironova (RUS)	26	48	43	22	0	3	—	0	—	142
17	Lisa Theresa Hauser (AUT)	27	30	28	—	6	24	26	0	—	141
18	Anaïs Bescond (FRA)	20	31	0	10	2	21	54	0	—	138
19	Vanessa Hinz (GER)	6	0	0	26	34	27	13	20	—	126
20	Kamila Zuk (POL)	13	25	25	32	31	0	—	0	—	126
21	Valj Semerenko (UKR)	17	32	0	16	0	5	29	27	—	126
22	Celia Aymonier (FRA)	32	1	0	15	0	26	19	28	—	121
23	Kaisa Mäkäräinen (FIN)	0	28	0	30	8	1	27	23	—	117
24	Katharina Innerhofer (AUT)	36	17	7	31	0	22	0	0	—	113
25	Larisa Kuklina (RUS)	23	0	13	11	5	0	25	36	—	113
26	Susan Dunklee (USA)	9	0	0	27	16	54	6	—	—	112
27	Mari Eder (FIN)	18	4	16	29	0	0	43	0	—	110
28	Olena Pidhrushna (UKR)	—	29	32	5	1	43	0	0	—	110
29	Linn Persson (SWE)	40	20	0	14	14	0	18	0	—	106
30	Mona Brorsson (SWE)	19	12	21	0	30	8	0	16	—	106
#	Name	ÖST	HOC	LGB	OBE	RUH	ANT	NOV	KON	OSL	Total
31	Lena Häcki (SUI)	34	21	30	0	17	0	0	0	—	102
32	Ekaterina Yurlova-Percht (RUS)	0	15	23	—	4	20	30	0	—	92
33	Selina Gasparin (SUI)	0	0	15	23	0	16	0	31	—	85
34	Baiba Bendika (LAT)	7	5	0	0	18	29	0	26	—	85
35	Vita Semerenko (UKR)	31	0	0	0	7	30	0	11	—	79
36	Ivona Fialková (SVK)	14	10	0	0	0	32	0	21	—	77
37	Emma Lunder (CAN)	0	0	5	36	0	6	24	5	—	76
38	Iryna Kryuko (BLR)	0	8	36	28	0	0	0	—	—	72
39	Eva Kristejn-Puskarčíková (CZE)	22	9	0	24	DNS	17	0	0	—	72
40	Aita Gasparin (SUI)	0	0	8	0	0	31	11	19	—	69
41	Yuliia Dzhima (UKR)	—	0	3	25	12	19	9	0	—	68
42	Elena Kruchinkina (BLR)	10	0	—	6	25	0	0	25	—	66
43	Karolin Horchler (GER)	0	0	—	—	3	18	10	29	—	60
44	Regina Oja (EST)	0	0	14	0	0	11	21	14	—	60
45	Hanna Sola (BLR)	0	11	0	0	43	0	4	DNS	—	58
46	Fuyuko Tachizaki (JPN)	28	0	0	17	0	0	0	3	—	48
47	Clare Egan (USA)	3	0	0	9	13	15	8	—	—	48
48	Federica Sanfilippo (ITA)	25	0	0	0	20	0	0	2	—	47
49	Karoline Offigstad Knotten (NOR)	4	20	22	0	0	0	0	—	—	46
50	Chloé Chevalier (FRA)	2	0	2	3	0	—	0	34	—	41
51	Kinga Zbylut (POL)	0	27	0	0	0	0	0	12	—	39
52	Milena Todorova (BUL)	0	0	0	0	0	14	23	—	—	37
53	Johanna Skottheim (SWE)	—	—	—	0	28	—	7	1	—	36
54	Caroline Colombo (FRA)	0	26	0	DNS	0	—	0	8	—	34
55	Thekla Brun-Lie (NOR)	—	2	17	—	15	—	—	—	—	34
56	Tang Jialin (CHN)	0	0	10	0	23	0	—	—	—	33
57	Christina Rieder (AUT)	0	0	4	0	0	0	22	7	—	33
58	Jessica Jislová (CZE)	0	24	6	0	0	0	0	0	—	30
59	Elisa Gasparin (SUI)	5	0	24	1	0	0	0	0	—	30
60	Anna Magnusson (SWE)	—	—	—	0	29	—	0	0	—	29
#	Name	ÖST	HOC	LGB	OBE	RUH	ANT	NOV	KON	OSL	Total
61	Anastasiya Merkushyna (UKR)	0	—	0	—	—	—	20	9	—	29
62	Synnøve Solemdal (NOR)	—	0	9	4	11	—	—	4	—	28
63	Johanna Talihärm (EST)	15	0	0	0	0	10	0	0	—	25
64	Kristina Rezstova (RUS)	0	22	0	0	0	—	0	0	—	22
65	Suvi Minkkinen (FIN)	0	0	0	0	10	0	5	6	—	21
66	Janina Hettich (GER)	—	—	18	2	0	0	0	0	—	20
67	Anna Frolina (KOR)	0	0	0	19	0	0	—	0	—	19
68	Irina Starykh (RUS)	0	—	—	0	0	0	1	17	—	18
69	Emilie Ågheim Kalkenberg (NOR)	—	—	—	—	—	—	—	15	—	15
70	Nicole Gontier (ITA)	0	13	0	0	0	—	—	—	—	13
71	Lea Einfalt (SLO)	—	0	0	0	0	12	0	0	—	12
72	Joanne Reid (USA)	0	0	0	—	—	0	12	—	—	12
73	Tamara Voronina (RUS)	12	0	0	—	—	—	—	—	—	12
74	Anastasiia Porshneva (RUS)	—	—	—	12	—	—	—	—	—	12
75	Darya Blashko (UKR)	0	0	11	—	0	—	—	—	—	11
76	Susanna Meinen (SUI)	—	—	—	—	—	—	—	10	—	10
77	Megan Bankes (CAN)	8	0	0	DNS	0	0	—	—	—	8
78	Natalija Kočergina (LTU)	0	0	0	0	0	7	—	—	—	7
78	Dzinara Alimbekava (BLR)	0	7	0	0	—	0	—	0	—	7
80	Meng Fanqi (CHN)	0	—	0	—	0	2	3	0	—	5
81	Chu Yuanmeng (CHN)	—	3	1	0	0	0	0	0	—	4
