= United States at the 2018 Winter Olympics =

- Flag of the United States
- IOC code: USA
- NOC: United States Olympic Committee

in Pyeongchang, South Korea February 9–25, 2018
- Competitors: 241 (134 men and 107 women) in 8 sports
- Flag bearers: Erin Hamlin (opening); Jessie Diggins (closing)
- Medals Ranked 4th: Gold 9 Silver 8 Bronze 6 Total 23

Winter Olympics appearances (overview)
- 1924; 1928; 1932; 1936; 1948; 1952; 1956; 1960; 1964; 1968; 1972; 1976; 1980; 1984; 1988; 1992; 1994; 1998; 2002; 2006; 2010; 2014; 2018; 2022; 2026

The United States competed at the 2018 Winter Olympics in Pyeongchang, South Korea, from February 9 to 25, 2018.

The United States had its least successful showing at a Winter Olympics since the 1998 Nagano Games, ranking fourth in both the gold and total medal count with 9 and 23 medals, respectively. There were some notable successes for the team. Jessie Diggins and Kikkan Randall won the cross-country skiing women's team sprint event to clinch the United States' first-ever Olympic gold medal in cross-country skiing. Skip John Shuster led his team to the United States' first-ever gold medal in curling, winning the men's curling over Sweden. The United States women's national ice hockey team won the gold in the women's ice hockey tournament for the first time since the inauguration of the sport in 1998 over the four-time defending gold medalist Canada in an overtime penalty shootout.

The United States earned medals in at least one event in 11 different sports, the most of any nation. These Games also included the 100th Winter Olympic gold medal for the Americans, won by Shaun White.

== Medalists ==
The following U.S. competitors won medals at the games. In the by discipline sections below, medalists' names are bolded.

Medal	Name	Sport	Event	Date
Gold	Red Gerard	Snowboarding	Men's slopestyle	February 11
Gold	Jamie Anderson	Snowboarding	Women's slopestyle	February 12
Gold	Chloe Kim	Snowboarding	Women's halfpipe	February 13
Gold	Shaun White	Snowboarding	Men's halfpipe	February 14
Gold	Mikaela Shiffrin	Alpine skiing	Women's giant slalom	February 15
Gold	Jessie Diggins; Kikkan Randall	Cross-country skiing	Women's team sprint	February 21
Gold	David Wise	Freestyle skiing	Men's halfpipe	February 22
Gold	United States women's national ice hockey team: Cayla Barnes; Kacey Bellamy; Hannah Brandt; Kendall Coyne; Dani Cameranesi; Brianna Decker; Meghan Duggan; Kali Flanagan; Nicole Hensley; Megan Keller; Amanda Kessel; Hilary Knight; Jocelyne Lamoureux-Davidson; Monique Lamoureux-Morando; Gigi Marvin; Sidney Morin; Kelly Pannek; Amanda Pelkey; Emily Pfalzer; Alex Rigsby; Maddie Rooney; Haley Skarupa; Lee Stecklein	Ice hockey	Women's tournament	February 22
Gold	Tyler George; Matt Hamilton; John Landsteiner; Joe Polo; John Shuster	Curling	Men's tournament	February 24
Silver	Chris Mazdzer	Luge	Men's singles	February 11
Silver	John-Henry Krueger	Short track speed skating	Men's 1000 meters	February 17
Silver	Nick Goepper	Freestyle skiing	Men's slopestyle	February 18
Silver	Lauren Gibbs; Elana Meyers Taylor	Bobsleigh	Two-woman	February 21
Silver	Mikaela Shiffrin	Alpine skiing	Women's combined	February 22
Silver	Alex Ferreira	Freestyle skiing	Men's halfpipe	February 22
Silver	Jamie Anderson	Snowboarding	Women's big air	February 22
Silver	Kyle Mack	Snowboarding	Men's big air	February 24
Bronze	Nathan Chen^{[a]} Alexa Scimeca Knierim; Chris Knierim; Mirai Nagasu; Adam Rippon; Alex Shibutani; Maia Shibutani; Bradie Tennell^{[a]}	Figure skating	Team event	February 12
Bronze	Arielle Gold	Snowboarding	Women's halfpipe	February 13
Bronze	Alex Shibutani; Maia Shibutani	Figure skating	Ice dancing	February 20
Bronze	Brita Sigourney	Freestyle skiing	Women's halfpipe	February 20
Bronze	Lindsey Vonn	Alpine skiing	Women's downhill	February 21
Bronze	Heather Bergsma; Brittany Bowe; Mia Manganello; Carlijn Schoutens^{[a]}	Speed skating	Women's team pursuit	February 21

Medals by sport
Sport	1st place, gold medalist(s)	2nd place, silver medalist(s)	3rd place, bronze medalist(s)	Total
Snowboarding	4	2	1	**7**
Freestyle skiing	1	2	1	**4**
Alpine skiing	1	1	1	**3**
Cross-country skiing	1	0	0	**1**
Curling	1	0	0	**1**
Ice hockey	1	0	0	**1**
Bobsleigh	0	1	0	**1**
Luge	0	1	0	**1**
Short track speed skating	0	1	0	**1**
Figure skating	0	0	2	**2**
Speed skating	0	0	1	**1**
Total	9	8	6	23

Medals by date
Day	Date	1st place, gold medalist(s)	2nd place, silver medalist(s)	3rd place, bronze medalist(s)	Total
2	February 11	1	1	0	**2**
3	February 12	1	0	1	**2**
4	February 13	1	0	1	**2**
5	February 14	1	0	0	**1**
6	February 15	1	0	0	**1**
8	February 17	0	1	0	**1**
9	February 18	0	1	0	**1**
11	February 20	0	0	2	**2**
12	February 21	1	1	2	**4**
13	February 22	2	3	0	**5**
15	February 24	1	1	0	**2**
Total		9	8	6	23

Medals by gender
Gender	1st place, gold medalist(s)	2nd place, silver medalist(s)	3rd place, bronze medalist(s)	Total	Percentage
Female	5	3	4	**12**	52.2%
Male	4	5	0	**9**	39.1%
Mixed	0	0	2	**2**	8.7%
Total	9	8	6	23	100%

Multiple medalists
Name	Sport	1st place, gold medalist(s)	2nd place, silver medalist(s)	3rd place, bronze medalist(s)	Total
Jamie Anderson	Snowboarding	1	1	0	**2**
Mikaela Shiffrin	Alpine skiing	1	1	0	**2**
Alex Shibutani	Figure skating	0	0	2	**2**
Maia Shibutani	Figure skating	0	0	2	**2**

^{a} Athletes who participated in preliminary rounds but not the final round.

== Competitors ==
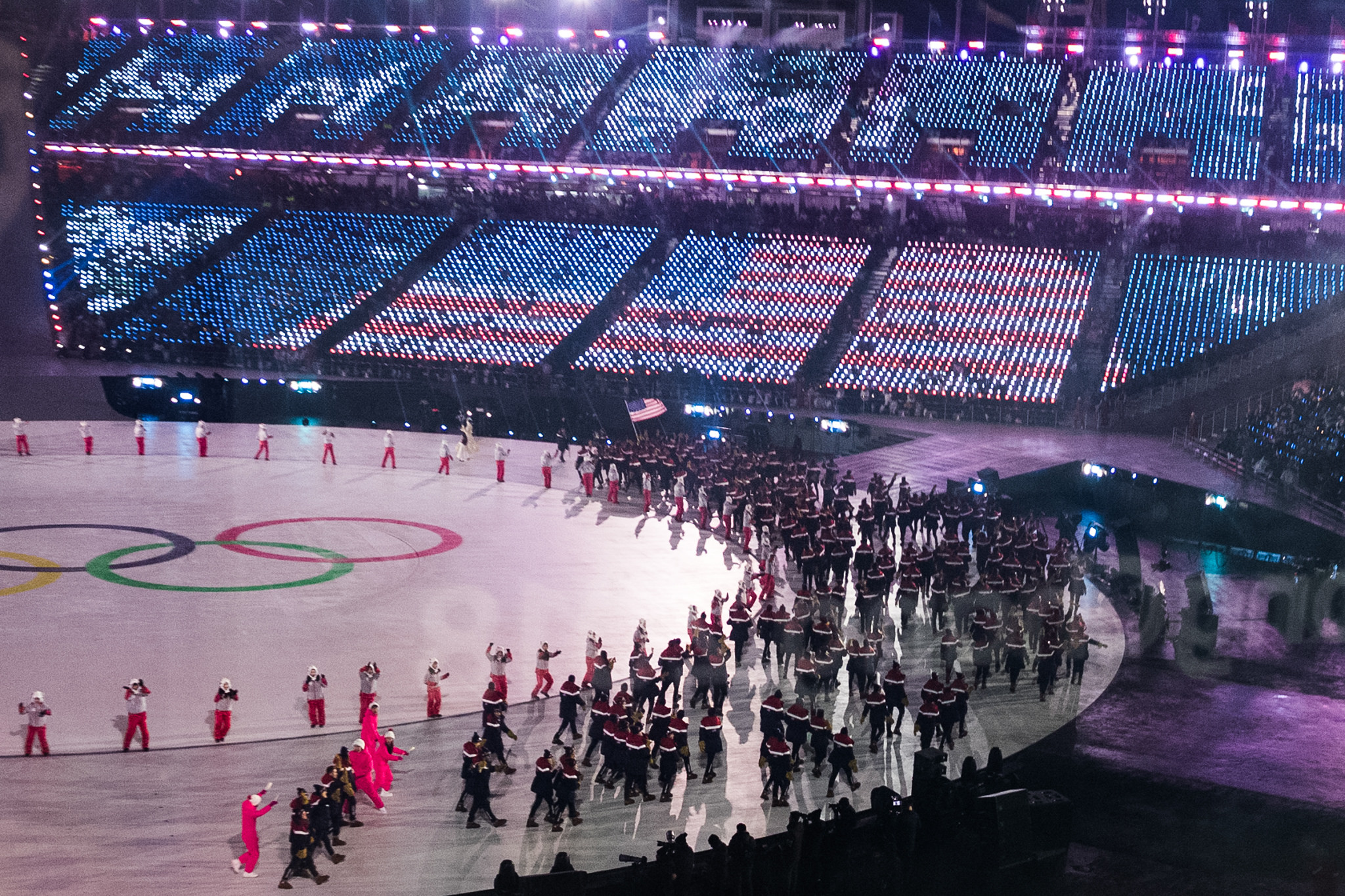
American athletes marching in the Parade of Nations

The following is the list of number of competitors participating at the Games per sport or discipline.

Sport	Men	Women	Total
Alpine skiing	12	10	22
Biathlon	5	5	10
Bobsleigh	12	4	16
Cross-country skiing	9	11	20
Curling	5	5	10*
Figure skating	7	7	14
Freestyle skiing	15	14	29
Ice hockey	25	23	48
Luge	7	3	10
Nordic combined	5	0	5
Short track speed skating	5	3	8
Skeleton	2	2	4
Ski jumping	4	3	7
Snowboarding	14	11	25
Speed skating	7	6	13
Total	134	107	241

*The United States qualified for 12 positions in curling, but two athletes competed in both the 4-person and mixed doubles tournament.

== Alpine skiing ==
Jacqueline Wiles was initially named to the team but withdrew after suffering knee and leg injuries in a February 3 World Cup race; the quota spot was filled by Tricia Mangan. Steven Nyman was initially named to the team but withdrew after tearing his right ACL during a training run; the quota spot was filled by Alice Merryweather.

Men

Athlete	Event	Run 1		Run 2		Total	
Athlete	Event	Time	Rank	Time	Rank	Time	Rank
Bryce Bennett	Downhill	—N/a				1:42.22	16
Ryan Cochran-Siegle	Downhill	—N/a				1:42.96	23
Jared Goldberg	Downhill	—N/a				1:42.59	20
Wiley Maple	Downhill	—N/a				1:43.72	30
Ryan Cochran-Siegle	Super-G	—N/a				1:25.72	14
Jared Goldberg	Super-G	—N/a				1:26.49	24
Ted Ligety	Super-G	—N/a				DNF	
Andrew Weibrecht	Super-G	—N/a				DNF	
Bryce Bennett	Combined	1:21.18	23	48.79	16	2:09.97	17
Ryan Cochran-Siegle	Combined	DNF					
Jared Goldberg	Combined	1:20.02	9	1:02.86	37	2:22.88	36
Ted Ligety	Combined	1:21.36	26	46.61	4	2:07.97	5
Ryan Cochran-Siegle	Giant slalom	1:10.75	21	1:09.99	3	2:20.74	11
Tommy Ford	Giant slalom	1:11.43	28	1:10.20	6	2:21.63	20
Tim Jitloff	Giant slalom	DNF					
Ted Ligety	Giant slalom	1:10.71	20	1:10.54	14	2:21.25	15
David Chodounsky	Slalom	49.43	17	51.41	14	1:40.84	18
Mark Engel	Slalom	56.18	43	53.17	27	1:49.31	31
Nolan Kasper	Slalom	52.44	34	DNF			

Women

Athlete	Event	Run 1		Run 2		Total	
Athlete	Event	Time	Rank	Time	Rank	Time	Rank
Breezy Johnson	Downhill	—N/a				1:40.34	7
Alice McKennis	Downhill	—N/a				1:40.24	5
Laurenne Ross	Downhill	—N/a				1:41.10	15
Lindsey Vonn	Downhill	—N/a				1:39.69	3rd place, bronze medalist(s)
Breezy Johnson	Super-G	—N/a				1:22.14	14
Alice McKennis	Super-G	—N/a				1:22.20	16
Laurenne Ross	Super-G	—N/a				1:22.17	15
Lindsey Vonn	Super-G	—N/a				1:21.49	6
Alice Merryweather	Combined	1:43.17	18	43.73	16	2:26.90	15
Mikaela Shiffrin	Combined	1:41.35	6	40.52	3	2:21.87	2nd place, silver medalist(s)
Lindsey Vonn	Combined	1:39.37	1	DNF			
Tricia Mangan	Giant slalom	DNF					
Megan McJames	Giant slalom	1:16.00	35	1:12.39	30	2:28.39	31
Mikaela Shiffrin	Giant slalom	1:10.82	2	1:09.20	4	2:20.02	1st place, gold medalist(s)
Resi Stiegler	Giant slalom	1:16.72	38	1:15.02	40	2:31.74	36
Alice Merryweather	Slalom	58.68	49	54.89	38	1:53.57	42
Megan McJames	Slalom	54.22	38	55.06	39	1:49.28	36
Mikaela Shiffrin	Slalom	49.37	4	49.66	3	1:39.03	4
Resi Stiegler	Slalom	DNF					

Mixed

Athlete	Event	Round of 16	Quarterfinals	Semifinals	Final / BM	
Athlete	Event	Opposition Result	Opposition Result	Opposition Result	Opposition Result	Rank
David Chodounsky; Nolan Kasper; Tricia Mangan; Megan McJames	Team	Great Britain; L 2–2^{*}	Did not advance			

* - Winner decided by total time of fastest male and female skiers

== Biathlon ==
Based on their Nations Cup rankings in the 2016–17 Biathlon World Cup, the United States qualified a team of 5 men and 5 women.

Men

Athlete	Event	Time	Misses	Rank
Lowell Bailey	Sprint	24:54.4	1 (0+1)	33
Tim Burke	Sprint	25:26.3	4 (2+2)	47
Sean Doherty	Sprint	25:55.2	4 (4+0)	65
Leif Nordgren	Sprint	25:49.0	2 (1+1)	58
Lowell Bailey	Pursuit	36:43.3	5 (0+0+3+2)	32
Tim Burke	Pursuit	35:11.3	2 (0+1+1+0)	17
Leif Nordgren	Pursuit	38:40.4	5 (2+2+0+1)	50
Lowell Bailey	Individual	52:56.8	4 (2+1+0+1)	51
Tim Burke	Individual	52:05.7	4 (1+1+0+2)	41
Sean Doherty	Individual	52:25.6	3 (2+0+1+0)	44
Leif Nordgren	Individual	54:31.1	5 (1+1+3+0)	66
Lowell Bailey; Tim Burke; Sean Doherty; Leif Nordgren	Team relay	1:19:06.7	16 (2+14)	6

Women

Athlete	Event	Time	Misses	Rank
Emily Dreissigacker	Sprint	23:27.2	1 (0+1)	51
Susan Dunklee	Sprint	24:13.1	5 (1+4)	66
Clare Egan	Sprint	23:51.6	3 (1+2)	61
Joanne Reid	Sprint	26:28.1	7 (4+3)	86
Emily Dreissigacker	Pursuit	35:36.7	4 (0+1+1+2)	47
Emily Dreissigacker	Individual	48:16.4	4 (2+1+0+1)	67
Susan Dunklee	Individual	44:33.5	2 (0+1+0+1)	19
Clare Egan	Individual	48:00.8	4 (0+3+0+1)	62
Joanne Reid	Individual	44:41.3	1 (0+1+0+0)	22
Emily Dreissigacker; Susan Dunklee; Clare Egan; Joanne Reid	Team relay	1:14:05.3	11 (6+5)	13

Mixed

Athlete	Event	Time	Misses	Rank
Lowell Bailey; Tim Burke; Susan Dunklee; Joanne Reid	Team relay	1:12:05.4	12 (3+9)	15

== Bobsleigh ==
Based on their rankings in the 2017–18 Bobsleigh World Cup, the United States qualified 8 sleds.

Men

Athlete	Event	Run 1		Run 2		Run 3		Run 4		Total	
Athlete	Event	Time	Rank	Time	Rank	Time	Rank	Time	Rank	Time	Rank
Codie Bascue^{D} Sam McGuffie	Two-man	50.03	25	50.16	13	49.90	23	Eliminated		2:30.09	25
Hakeem Abdul-Saboor; Nick Cunningham^{D}	Two-man	49.96	24	50.11	12	49.62	15	Eliminated		2:29.69	21
Justin Olsen^{D} Evan Weinstock	Two-man	49.66	12	49.55	6	49.53	11	49.80	16	3:18.54	14
Codie Bascue^{D} Steve Langton; Sam McGuffie; Evan Weinstock	Four-man	49.09	12	49.34	10	49.08	8	49.77	16	3:17.28	9
Hakeem Abdul-Saboor; Nick Cunningham^{D} Christopher Kinney; Sam Michener	Four-man	49.60	20	49.50	15	49.74	21	49.70	13	3:18.54	19
Chris Fogt; Justin Olsen^{D} Carlo Valdes; Nathan Weber	Four-man	49.62	21	49.71	20	49.66	18	49.56	4	3:18.55	20

Women

Athlete	Event	Run 1		Run 2		Run 3		Run 4		Total	
Athlete	Event	Time	Rank	Time	Rank	Time	Rank	Time	Rank	Time	Rank
Lauren Gibbs; Elana Meyers Taylor^{D}	Two-woman	50.52	1	50.81	2	50.46	1	50.73	3	1:41.33	2nd place, silver medalist(s)
Aja Evans; Jamie Greubel^{D}	Two-woman	50.59	3	50.99	8	50.59	4	50.85	5	1:41.58	5

^{D} – Denotes the driver of each sled

== Cross-country skiing ==
Distance
Men

Athlete	Event	Classical		Freestyle		Total	
Athlete	Event	Time	Rank	Time	Rank	Time	Rank
Erik Bjornsen	15 km freestyle	—N/a				36:28.6	41
Noah Hoffman	15 km freestyle	—N/a				36:45.2	48
Tyler Kornfield	15 km freestyle	—N/a				38:17.9	74
Scott Patterson	15 km freestyle	—N/a				35:28.0	21
Erik Bjornsen	30 km skiathlon	42:12.4	37	38:12.7	43	1:20:54.7	42
Patrick Caldwell	30 km skiathlon	44:01.3	53	38:44.1	49	1:23:18.1	51
Noah Hoffman	30 km skiathlon	43:27.7	50	39:30.6	56	1:23:28.7	54
Scott Patterson	30 km skiathlon	41:14.4	26	35:41.2	11	1:17:27.5	18
Noah Hoffman	50 km classical	—N/a				2:19:04.1	33
Tyler Kornfield	50 km classical	—N/a				2:24:36.5	48
Scott Patterson	50 km classical	—N/a				2:13:14.2	11
Reese Hanneman; Noah Hoffman; Andrew Newell; Scott Patterson	4×10 km relay	—N/a				1:42:29.1	14

Women

Athlete	Event	Classical		Freestyle		Total	
Athlete	Event	Time	Rank	Time	Rank	Time	Rank
Sadie Bjornsen	10 km freestyle	—N/a				26:42.6	15
Jessie Diggins	10 km freestyle	—N/a				25:35.7	5
Kikkan Randall	10 km freestyle	—N/a				26:50.4	16
Liz Stephen	10 km freestyle	—N/a				27:35.9	30
Rosie Brennan	15 km skiathlon	23:36.7	45	23:16.6	60	47:36.0	58
Jessie Diggins	15 km skiathlon	21:29.4	13	19:02.3	5	40:59.6	5
Caitlin Patterson	15 km skiathlon	23:07.1	36	20:32.9	27	44:14.9	34
Kikkan Randall	15 km skiathlon	23:29.2	39	20:43.0	33	44:47.2	40
Sadie Bjornsen	30 km classical	—N/a				1:28:50.2	17
Jessie Diggins	30 km classical	—N/a				1:25:54.8	7
Rosie Frankowski	30 km classical	—N/a				1:31:11.4	21
Caitlin Patterson	30 km classical	—N/a				1:32:43.6	26
Sadie Bjornsen; Sophie Caldwell; Jessie Diggins; Kikkan Randall	4×5 km relay	—N/a				52:44.8	5

Sprint
Men

Athlete	Event	Qualification		Quarterfinals		Semifinals		Final	
Athlete	Event	Time	Rank	Time	Rank	Time	Rank	Time	Rank
Erik Bjornsen	Sprint	3:17.69	30 Q	3:12.71	5	Did not advance			
Simeon Hamilton	Sprint	3:16.13	19 Q	3:27.89	4	Did not advance			
Logan Hanneman	Sprint	3:20.74	42	Did not advance					
Andrew Newell	Sprint	3:19.36	37	Did not advance					
Erik Bjornsen; Simeon Hamilton	Team sprint	—N/a				16:04.69	3 q	16:16.98	6

Qualification legend: Q – Qualify on position in heat; q – Qualify on time in round

Women

Athlete	Event	Qualification		Quarterfinal		Semifinal		Final	
Athlete	Event	Time	Rank	Time	Rank	Time	Rank	Time	Rank
Sadie Bjornsen	Sprint	3:16.12	9 Q	3:16.75	3	Did not advance			
Sophie Caldwell	Sprint	3:17.06	12 Q	3:12.39	2 Q	3:11.32	4	Did not advance	
Jessie Diggins	Sprint	3:15.76	7 Q	3:11.24	2 Q	3:10.72	2 Q	3:15.07	6
Ida Sargent	Sprint	3:25.80	33	Did not advance					
Jessie Diggins; Kikkan Randall	Team sprint	—N/a				16:22.56	1 Q	15:56.47	1st place, gold medalist(s)

Qualification legend: Q – Qualify on position in heat; q – Qualify on time in round

== Curling ==
Summary

Team	Event	Group stage										Tiebreaker	Semifinal	Final / BM	
Team	Event	Opposition Score	Opposition Score	Opposition Score	Opposition Score	Opposition Score	Opposition Score	Opposition Score	Opposition Score	Opposition Score	Rank	Opposition Score	Opposition Score	Opposition Score	Rank
Tyler George; Matt Hamilton; John Landsteiner; Joe Polo; John Shuster (S)	Men's tournament	KOR; W 11–7	ITA; L 9–10	SWE; L 4–10	DEN; W 9–5	JPN; L 2–8	NOR; L 5–8	CAN; W 9–7	SUI; W 8–4	GBR; W 10–4	3 Q	Bye	CAN; W 5–3	SWE; W 10–7	1st place, gold medalist(s)
Cory Christensen; Aileen Geving; Becca Hamilton; Tabitha Peterson; Nina Roth (S)	Women's tournament	JPN; L 5–10	GBR; W 7–4	SUI; L 5–6	OAR; W 7–6	CAN; L 3–11	DEN; W 7–6	CHN; W 10–4	KOR; L 6–9	SWE; L 6–9	8	Did not advance			
Becca Hamilton; Matt Hamilton	Mixed doubles	OAR; W 9–3	CAN; L 4–6	SUI; L 4–9	KOR; L 1–9	CHN; L 4–6	NOR; W 10-3	FIN; L 5–7	—N/a		6	Did not advance			

=== Men's tournament ===
Based on results from the 2016 World Men's Curling Championship and the 2017 World Men's Curling Championship, the United States qualified a men's team, consisting of five athletes, as one of the seven highest ranked nations.

Roster
The United States men's curling team curled out of the Duluth Curling Club in Duluth, Minnesota. They were selected by winning the 2017 United States Olympic Curling Trials.

Position	Curler
Skip	John Shuster
Third	Tyler George
Second	Matt Hamilton
Lead	John Landsteiner
Alternate	Joe Polo

Round-robin

Final round robin standings
Team	Skip	Pld	W	L	PF	PA	EW	EL	BE	SE	S%	Qualification
Sweden	Niklas Edin	9	7	2	62	43	34	28	13	8	87%	Playoffs
Canada	Kevin Koe	9	6	3	56	46	36	34	14	8	87%	Playoffs
United States	John Shuster	9	5	4	67	63	37	39	4	6	80%	Playoffs
Great Britain	Kyle Smith	9	5	4	55	60	40	37	8	7	82%	Tiebreaker
Switzerland	Peter de Cruz	9	5	4	60	55	39	37	10	6	83%	Tiebreaker
Norway	Thomas Ulsrud	9	4	5	52	56	34	39	7	8	82%	
South Korea	Kim Chang-min	9	4	5	65	63	39	39	8	8	82%	
Japan	Yusuke Morozumi	9	4	5	48	56	33	35	13	5	81%	
Italy	Joël Retornaz	9	3	6	50	56	37	38	15	7	81%	
Denmark	Rasmus Stjerne	9	2	7	53	70	36	39	12	5	83%	

The United States has a bye in draws 2, 6, and 10.

Draw 1
Wednesday, February 14, 09:05

Sheet C	1	2	3	4	5	6	7	8	9	10	Final
South Korea (Kim)	0	2	0	1	0	3	0	1	0	X	7
United States (Shuster) 🔨	2	0	3	0	3	0	2	0	1	X	11

Draw 3
Thursday, February 15, 14:05

Sheet A	1	2	3	4	5	6	7	8	9	10	Final
United States (Shuster)	0	1	0	3	2	0	0	2	1	0	9
Italy (Retornaz) 🔨	1	0	5	0	0	3	0	0	0	1	10

Draw 4
Friday, February 16, 09:05

Sheet D	1	2	3	4	5	6	7	8	9	10	Final
Sweden (Edin) 🔨	4	1	0	2	0	1	0	2	X	X	10
United States (Shuster)	0	0	1	0	1	0	2	0	X	X	4

Draw 5
Friday, February 16, 20:05

Sheet C	1	2	3	4	5	6	7	8	9	10	Final
Denmark (Stjerne)	0	0	0	0	2	1	0	2	0	X	5
United States (Shuster) 🔨	2	2	0	2	0	0	2	0	1	X	9

Draw 7
Sunday, February 18, 09:05

Sheet B	1	2	3	4	5	6	7	8	9	10	Final
United States (Shuster)	0	0	0	0	2	0	0	X	X	X	2
Japan (Morozumi) 🔨	2	1	1	0	0	2	2	X	X	X	8

Draw 8
Sunday, February 18, 20:05

Sheet D	1	2	3	4	5	6	7	8	9	10	Final
United States (Shuster) 🔨	1	0	2	0	1	0	0	0	1	X	5
Norway (Ulsrud)	0	2	0	1	0	3	1	1	0	X	8

Draw 9
Monday, February 19, 14:05

Sheet C	1	2	3	4	5	6	7	8	9	10	11	Final
United States (Shuster) 🔨	1	0	2	0	1	1	0	0	2	0	2	9
Canada (Koe)	0	2	0	1	0	0	1	1	0	2	0	7

Draw 11
Tuesday, February 20, 20:05

Sheet A	1	2	3	4	5	6	7	8	9	10	Final
Switzerland (de Cruz) 🔨	0	1	0	1	0	1	0	1	0	X	4
United States (Shuster)	0	0	1	0	3	0	3	0	1	X	8

Draw 12
Wednesday, February 21, 14:05

Sheet B	1	2	3	4	5	6	7	8	9	10	Final
Great Britain (Smith)	0	1	1	1	0	1	0	0	X	X	4
United States (Shuster) 🔨	2	0	0	0	3	0	1	4	X	X	10

Semifinal
Thursday, February 22, 20:05

Sheet C	1	2	3	4	5	6	7	8	9	10	Final
Canada (Koe) 🔨	0	1	0	1	0	0	0	0	1	0	3
United States (Shuster)	0	0	1	0	1	0	0	2	0	1	5

Gold medal game
Saturday, February 24, 15:35

Sheet B	1	2	3	4	5	6	7	8	9	10	Final
Sweden (Edin) 🔨	0	2	0	0	2	0	1	0	2	X	7
United States (Shuster)	0	0	2	1	0	2	0	5	0	X	10

=== Women's tournament ===
Based on results from the 2016 Ford World Women's Curling Championship and the 2017 World Women's Curling Championship, the United States qualified a women's team, consisting of five athletes, as one of the seven highest ranked nations.

Roster
The United States women's curling team curled out of the Four Seasons Curling Club in Blaine, Minnesota. They were selected by winning the 2017 United States Olympic Curling Trials.

Position	Curler
Skip	Nina Roth
Third	Tabitha Peterson
Second	Aileen Geving
Lead	Rebecca Hamilton
Alternate	Cory Christensen

Round-robin

Final round robin standings
Team	Skip	Pld	W	L	PF	PA	EW	EL	BE	SE	S%	Qualification
South Korea	Kim Eun-jung	9	8	1	75	44	41	34	5	15	79%	Playoffs
Sweden	Anna Hasselborg	9	7	2	64	48	42	34	14	13	83%	Playoffs
Great Britain	Eve Muirhead	9	6	3	61	56	39	38	12	6	79%	Playoffs
Japan	Satsuki Fujisawa	9	5	4	59	55	38	36	10	13	75%	Playoffs
China	Wang Bingyu	9	4	5	57	65	35	38	12	5	78%	
Canada	Rachel Homan	9	4	5	68	59	40	36	10	12	81%	
Switzerland	Silvana Tirinzoni	9	4	5	60	55	34	37	12	7	78%	
United States	Nina Roth	9	4	5	56	65	38	39	7	6	78%	
Olympic Athletes from Russia	Victoria Moiseeva	9	2	7	45	76	34	40	8	6	76%	
Denmark	Madeleine Dupont	9	1	8	50	72	32	41	10	6	73%	

The United States had a bye in draws 4, 7, and 11.

Draw 1
Wednesday, February 14, 14:05

Sheet A	1	2	3	4	5	6	7	8	9	10	Final
Japan (Fujisawa)	2	2	3	0	1	0	0	1	1	X	10
United States (Roth) 🔨	0	0	0	1	0	3	1	0	0	X	5

Draw 2
Thursday, February 15, 09:05

Sheet D	1	2	3	4	5	6	7	8	9	10	Final
Great Britain (Muirhead) 🔨	1	0	0	2	0	0	0	1	0	0	4
United States (Roth)	0	0	2	0	0	2	0	0	1	2	7

Draw 3
Thursday, February 15, 20:05

Sheet C	1	2	3	4	5	6	7	8	9	10	Final
United States (Roth)	0	0	1	0	0	2	0	1	0	1	5
Switzerland (Tirinzoni) 🔨	0	2	0	1	2	0	0	0	1	0	6

Draw 5
Saturday, February 17, 09:05

Sheet B	1	2	3	4	5	6	7	8	9	10	11	Final
Olympic Athletes from Russia (Moiseeva)	0	2	0	0	1	1	0	1	0	1	0	6
United States (Roth) 🔨	1	0	2	1	0	0	1	0	1	0	1	7

Draw 6
Saturday, February 17, 20:05

Sheet D	1	2	3	4	5	6	7	8	9	10	Final
United States (Roth) 🔨	0	1	0	1	0	1	0	X	X	X	3
Canada (Homan)	3	0	1	0	3	0	4	X	X	X	11

Draw 8
Monday, February 19, 09:05

Sheet A	1	2	3	4	5	6	7	8	9	10	Final
United States (Roth) 🔨	1	0	1	1	0	2	0	1	0	1	7
Denmark (Dupont)	0	1	0	0	2	0	2	0	1	0	6

Draw 9
Monday, February 19, 20:05

Sheet C	1	2	3	4	5	6	7	8	9	10	Final
China (Wang)	0	1	0	2	0	0	0	1	X	X	4
United States (Roth) 🔨	3	0	4	0	2	0	1	0	X	X	10

Draw 10
Tuesday, February 20, 14:05

Sheet B	1	2	3	4	5	6	7	8	9	10	Final
United States (Roth) 🔨	2	0	1	0	0	1	0	2	0	X	6
South Korea (Kim)	0	1	0	1	4	0	1	0	2	X	9

Draw 12
Wednesday, February 21, 20:05

Sheet A	1	2	3	4	5	6	7	8	9	10	Final
Sweden (Hasselborg) 🔨	3	0	1	0	1	0	0	1	0	3	9
United States (Roth)	0	2	0	1	0	0	2	0	1	0	6

=== Mixed doubles tournament ===
Based on results from the 2016 World Mixed Doubles Curling Championship and the 2017 World Mixed Doubles Curling Championship, the United States qualified a mixed doubles team, consisting of two athletes, as one of the seven highest ranked nations.

Roster
The United States Hamilton/Hamilton pair curled out of the Madison Curling Club in Middleton, Wisconsin. They were selected by winning the 2017 United States Mixed Doubles Curling Olympic Trials.

Position	Curler
Female	Rebecca Hamilton
Male	Matt Hamilton

Round-robin

Final round robin standings
Team	Athletes	Pld	W	L	PF	PA	EW	EL	BE	SE	S%	Qualification
Canada	Kaitlyn Lawes / John Morris	7	6	1	52	26	28	20	0	9	80%	Playoffs
Switzerland	Jenny Perret / Martin Rios	7	5	2	45	40	29	26	0	10	71%	Playoffs
Olympic Athletes from Russia	Anastasia Bryzgalova / Alexander Krushelnitskiy	7	4	3	36	44	26	27	1	7	67%	Playoffs
Norway	Kristin Skaslien / Magnus Nedregotten	7	4	3	39	43	26	25	1	8	74%	Tiebreaker
China	Wang Rui / Ba Dexin	7	4	3	47	42	27	27	1	6	72%	Tiebreaker
South Korea	Jang Hye-ji / Lee Ki-jeong	7	2	5	40	40	23	29	1	7	67%	
United States	Rebecca Hamilton / Matt Hamilton	7	2	5	37	43	26	25	0	9	74%	
Finland	Oona Kauste / Tomi Rantamäki	7	1	6	35	53	23	29	0	6	67%	

Draw 1
Thursday, February 8, 9:05

Sheet A	1	2	3	4	5	6	7	8	Final
United States (R. Hamilton / M. Hamilton) 🔨	3	0	1	1	2	0	2	X	9
Olympic Athletes from Russia (Bryzgalova / Krushelnitskiy)	0	2	0	0	0	1	0	X	3

Draw 2
Thursday, February 8, 20:05

Sheet D	1	2	3	4	5	6	7	8	Final
United States (R. Hamilton / M. Hamilton) 🔨	1	0	1	0	0	1	1	0	4
Canada (Lawes / Morris)	0	1	0	1	3	0	0	1	6

Draw 3
Friday, February 9, 8:35

Sheet B	1	2	3	4	5	6	7	8	Final
United States (R. Hamilton / M. Hamilton) 🔨	1	1	0	1	0	0	1	0	4
Switzerland (Perret / Rios)	0	0	1	0	1	1	0	6	9

Draw 4
Friday, February 9, 13:35

Sheet C	1	2	3	4	5	6	7	8	Final
United States (R. Hamilton / M. Hamilton)	0	1	0	0	0	0	X	X	1
South Korea (Jang / Lee) 🔨	2	0	2	3	1	1	X	X	9

Draw 5
Saturday, February 10, 9:05

Sheet A	1	2	3	4	5	6	7	8	Final
China (Wang / Ba) 🔨	0	1	0	1	1	1	0	2	6
United States (R. Hamilton / M. Hamilton)	2	0	1	0	0	0	1	0	4

Draw 6
Saturday, February 10, 20:05

Sheet C	1	2	3	4	5	6	7	8	Final
Norway (Skaslien / Nedregotten)	0	3	0	0	0	0	X	X	3
United States (R. Hamilton / M. Hamilton) 🔨	1	0	1	4	1	3	X	X	10

Draw 7
Sunday, February 11, 9:05

Sheet B	1	2	3	4	5	6	7	8	Final
Finland (Kauste / Rantamäki)	1	0	0	1	1	0	4	0	7
United States (R. Hamilton / M. Hamilton) 🔨	0	1	1	0	0	1	0	2	5

== Figure skating ==
The United States qualified 14 figure skaters (seven male and seven female), based on its placement at the 2017 World Figure Skating Championships in Helsinki, Finland. The U.S. won the bronze medal in the team event for the second consecutive Olympics.

Individual

Athlete	Event	SP		FS		Total	
Athlete	Event	Points	Rank	Points	Rank	Points	Rank
Nathan Chen	Men's singles	82.27	17 Q	215.08	1	297.35	5
Adam Rippon	Men's singles	87.95	7 Q	171.41	10	259.36	10
Vincent Zhou	Men's singles	84.53	12 Q	192.16	6	276.69	6
Karen Chen	Ladies' singles	65.90	10 Q	119.75	11	185.65	11
Mirai Nagasu	Ladies' singles	66.93	9 Q	119.61	12	186.54	10
Bradie Tennell	Ladies' singles	64.01	11 Q	128.24	9	192.35	9

Mixed

Athlete	Event	SP / SD		FS / FD		Total	
Athlete	Event	Points	Rank	Points	Rank	Points	Rank
Alexa Scimeca Knierim; Chris Knierim	Pairs	65.55	14 Q	120.27	15	185.82	15
Madison Chock; Evan Bates	Ice dancing	75.45	7 Q	100.13	12	175.58	9
Madison Hubbell; Zachary Donahue	Ice dancing	77.75	3 Q	109.94	5	187.69	4
Maia Shibutani; Alex Shibutani	Ice dancing	77.73	4 Q	114.86	3	192.59	3rd place, bronze medalist(s)

Team

Athlete	Event	Short program/Short dance						Free skate/Free dance					
Athlete	Event	Men's	Ladies'	Pairs	Ice dance	Total		Men's	Ladies'	Pairs	Ice dance	Total	
Athlete	Event	Points Team points	Points Team points	Points Team points	Points Team points	Points	Rank	Points Team points	Points Team points	Points Team points	Points Team points	Points	Rank
Nathan Chen (M) (SP); Adam Rippon (M) (FS); Bradie Tennell (L) (SP); Mirai Nagasu (L) (FS); Alexa Scimeca Knierim (P); Chris Knierim (P); Maia Shibutani (ID); Alex Shibutani (ID)	Team event	80.61; 7	68.94; 6	69.75; 7	75.46; 9	29	3 Q	172.98; 8	137.53; 9	126.56; 7	112.01; 9	62	3rd place, bronze medalist(s)

== Freestyle skiing ==
Aerials

Athlete	Event	Qualification				Final					
Athlete	Event	Jump 1		Jump 2		Jump 1		Jump 2		Jump 3	
Athlete	Event	Points	Rank	Points	Rank	Points	Rank	Points	Rank	Points	Rank
Mac Bohonnon	Men's aerials	85.97	23	112.396	11	Did not advance					
Jonathon Lillis	Men's aerials	127.44	1 QF	Bye		121.68	7 Q	95.47	8	Did not advance	
Eric Loughran	Men's aerials	86.28	22	72.40	19	Did not advance					
Ashley Caldwell	Women's aerials	81.81	11	55.86	11	Did not advance					
Kiley McKinnon	Women's aerials	72.26	17	87.88	5 Q	80.95	10	Did not advance			
Madison Olsen	Women's aerials	87.88	9	80.04	6 Q	85.36	8 Q	83.23	6 Q	47.23	6

Freeskiing
Men

Athlete	Event	Qualification				Final				
Athlete	Event	Run 1	Run 2	Best	Rank	Run 1	Run 2	Run 3	Best	Rank
Aaron Blunck	Halfpipe	63.20	94.40	94.40	1 Q	81.40	5.60	84.80	84.80	7
Alex Ferreira	Halfpipe	92.60	43.40	92.60	2 Q	92.60	96.00	96.40	96.40	2nd place, silver medalist(s)
David Wise	Halfpipe	24.80	79.60	79.60	8 Q	17.00	6.40	97.20	97.20	1st place, gold medalist(s)
Torin Yater-Wallace	Halfpipe	89.60	33.60	89.60	3 Q	65.20	28.80	12.20	65.20	9
Nick Goepper	Slopestyle	92.80	85.00	92.80	5 Q	59.00	69.00	93.60	93.60	2nd place, silver medalist(s)
Alexander Hall	Slopestyle	69.80	77.80	77.80	16	Did not advance				
Gus Kenworthy	Slopestyle	88.60	90.80	90.80	7 Q	35.00	20.00	32.00	35.00	12
McRae Williams	Slopestyle	81.60	26.40	81.60	15	Did not advance				

Women

Athlete	Event	Qualification				Final				
Athlete	Event	Run 1	Run 2	Best	Rank	Run 1	Run 2	Run 3	Best	Rank
Maddie Bowman	Halfpipe	83.60	83.80	83.80	6 Q	25.80	26.40	27.00	27.00	11
Annalisa Drew	Halfpipe	85.40	86.00	86.00	4 Q	86.80	73.00	90.80	90.80	4
Devin Logan	Halfpipe	71.60	25.60	71.60	15	Did not advance				
Brita Sigourney	Halfpipe	90.60	90.60	90.60	3 Q	89.80	88.60	91.60	91.60	3rd place, bronze medalist(s)
Caroline Claire	Slopestyle	20.00	16.40	20.00	23	Did not advance				
Devin Logan	Slopestyle	84.80	37.60	84.80	6 Q	22.60	56.80	10.60	56.80	10
Darian Stevens	Slopestyle	8.20	64.00	64.00	17	Did not advance				
Maggie Voisin	Slopestyle	72.80	73.00	73.00	12 Q	26.40	37.60	81.20	81.20	4

Moguls
Men

Athlete	Event	Qualification								Final											
Athlete	Event	Run 1				Run 2				Run 1				Run 2				Run 3			
Athlete	Event	Time	Points	Total	Rank	Time	Points	Total	Rank	Time	Points	Total	Rank	Time	Points	Total	Rank	Time	Points	Total	Rank
Casey Andringa	Moguls	26.04	61.79	75.25	14	25.57	63.09	77.37	3 Q	25.23	66.00	80.73	5 Q	24.94	65.69	80.80	3 Q	25.86	61.60	75.50	5
Troy Murphy	Moguls	25.40	66.44	80.95	4 Q	Bye				25.36	58.16	72.72	17	Did not advance							
Emerson Smith	Moguls	25.41	58.10	72.59	22	25.34	59.47	73.94	13	Did not advance											
Bradley Wilson	Moguls	24.38	59.40	75.25	15	24.76	60.98	76.33	4 Q	23.37	45.52	62.74	18	Did not advance							

Women

Athlete	Event	Qualification								Final											
Athlete	Event	Run 1				Run 2				Run 1				Run 2				Run 3			
Athlete	Event	Time	Points	Total	Rank	Time	Points	Total	Rank	Time	Points	Total	Rank	Time	Points	Total	Rank	Time	Points	Total	Rank
Tess Johnson	Moguls	30.56	51.99	65.55	22	30.97	62.23	75.33	1 Q	30.68	60.67	74.10	9 Q	30.77	57.17	70.49	12	Did not advance			
Jaelin Kauf	Moguls	28.91	62.03	77.45	5 Q	Bye				28.79	63.17	78.73	2 Q	28.74	60.52	76.03	7	Did not advance			
Keaton McCargo	Moguls	29.84	61.30	75.67	8 Q	Bye				30.04	62.73	76.88	3 Q	29.54	61.02	75.79	8	Did not advance			
Morgan Schild	Moguls	29.76	63.28	77.74	3 Q	Bye				30.80	58.94	72.23	15	Did not advance							

== Ice hockey ==
The United States qualified a men's and women's team for a total of 48 athletes.

Summary

Key:

- OT – Overtime
- GWS – Match decided by penalty-shootout

Team	Event	Group stage				Qualification playoff	Quarterfinal	Semifinal / Pl.	Final / BM / Pl.	
Team	Event	Opposition Score	Opposition Score	Opposition Score	Rank	Opposition Score	Opposition Score	Opposition Score	Opposition Score	Rank
United States men's	Men's tournament	Slovenia; L 2–3 OT	Slovakia; W 2–1	Olympic Athletes from Russia; L 0–4	3 QP	Slovakia; W 5–1	Czech Republic; L 2–3 GWS	Did not advance		7
United States women's	Women's tournament	Finland; W 3–1	Olympic Athletes from Russia; W 5–0	Canada; L 1–2	2 QS	—N/a	Bye	Finland; W 5–0	Canada; W 3–2 GWS	1st place, gold medalist(s)

=== Men's tournament ===
The United States men's national ice hockey team qualified by finishing 5th in the 2015 IIHF World Ranking.

Following the National Hockey League's decision to pull out of the Olympics, the US team relied heavily on professionals from European leagues and the American Hockey League. The team eventually lost in the quarterfinals.

Roster The following is the American roster for the men's ice hockey tournament at the 2018 Winter Olympics.

Head coach: (United States) Tony Granato Assistant coaches: (United States) Keith Allain, (United States) Chris Chelios, (United States) Scott Young

No.	Pos.	Name	Height	Weight	Birthdate	Birthplace	2017–18 team
4	D	Chad Billins	5 ft 8 in (173 cm)	174 lb (79 kg)	May 26, 1989	Marysville, Michigan	(Sweden) Linköpings HC (SHL)
5	D	Noah Welch – A	6 ft 4 in (193 cm)	220 lb (100 kg)	August 26, 1982	Brighton, Massachusetts	(Sweden) Växjö Lakers (SHL)
7	F	John McCarthy	6 ft 1 in (185 cm)	194 lb (88 kg)	August 9, 1986	Boston, Massachusetts	(United States) San Jose Barracuda (AHL)
9	F	Brian O'Neill	5 ft 9 in (175 cm)	172 lb (78 kg)	June 1, 1988	Yardley, Pennsylvania	(Finland) Jokerit (KHL)
11	F	Garrett Roe	5 ft 8 in (173 cm)	181 lb (82 kg)	February 22, 1988	Vienna, Virginia	(Switzerland) EV Zug (NL)
12	F	Brian Gionta – C	5 ft 7 in (170 cm)	179 lb (81 kg)	January 18, 1979	Rochester, New York	Free agent
13	D	Ryan Gunderson	5 ft 10 in (178 cm)	174 lb (79 kg)	August 16, 1985	Bensalem, Pennsylvania	(Sweden) Brynäs IF (SHL)
14	F	Broc Little	5 ft 9 in (175 cm)	170 lb (77 kg)	March 24, 1988	Phoenix, Arizona	(Switzerland) HC Davos (NL)
15	F	Bobby Butler	6 ft 0 in (183 cm)	190 lb (86 kg)	April 26, 1987	Marlborough, Massachusetts	(United States) Milwaukee Admirals (AHL)
16	F	Ryan Donato	6 ft 0 in (183 cm)	192 lb (87 kg)	April 9, 1996	Scituate, Massachusetts	(United States) Harvard Crimson (ECAC)
17	F	Chris Bourque	5 ft 8 in (173 cm)	174 lb (79 kg)	January 29, 1986	Boston, Massachusetts	(United States) Hershey Bears (AHL)
18	F	Jordan Greenway	6 ft 6 in (198 cm)	227 lb (103 kg)	February 16, 1997	Canton, New York	(United States) Boston University Terriers (HE)
19	F	Jim Slater	6 ft 0 in (183 cm)	190 lb (86 kg)	December 9, 1982	Lapeer, Michigan	(Switzerland) HC Fribourg-Gottéron (NL)
20	D	Will Borgen	6 ft 2 in (188 cm)	187 lb (85 kg)	December 19, 1996	Moorhead, Minnesota	(United States) St. Cloud State Huskies (NCHC)
21	D	James Wisniewski	5 ft 11 in (180 cm)	203 lb (92 kg)	February 21, 1984	Canton, Michigan	(Germany) EC Kassel Huskies (DEL2)
22	D	Bobby Sanguinetti	6 ft 3 in (191 cm)	190 lb (86 kg)	February 29, 1988	Trenton, New Jersey	(Switzerland) HC Lugano (NL)
23	F	Troy Terry	6 ft 1 in (185 cm)	174 lb (79 kg)	September 10, 1997	Highlands Ranch, Colorado	(United States) Denver Pioneers (NCHC)
24	D	Jonathon Blum	6 ft 1 in (185 cm)	187 lb (85 kg)	January 30, 1989	Long Beach, California	(Russia) HC Sochi (KHL)
26	F	Mark Arcobello	5 ft 8 in (173 cm)	174 lb (79 kg)	August 12, 1988	Milford, Connecticut	(Switzerland) SC Bern (NL)
30	G	Ryan Zapolski	6 ft 0 in (183 cm)	203 lb (92 kg)	November 11, 1986	Erie, Pennsylvania	(Finland) Jokerit (KHL)
31	G	Brandon Maxwell	6 ft 1 in (185 cm)	196 lb (89 kg)	March 22, 1991	Winter Park, Florida	(Czech Republic) BK Mladá Boleslav (ELH)
35	G	David Leggio	6 ft 0 in (183 cm)	185 lb (84 kg)	July 31, 1984	Williamsville, New York	(Germany) EHC Red Bull München (DEL)
42	F	Chad Kolarik	5 ft 11 in (180 cm)	183 lb (83 kg)	January 26, 1986	Abington, Pennsylvania	(Germany) Adler Mannheim (DEL)
94	F	Ryan Stoa	6 ft 3 in (191 cm)	212 lb (96 kg)	April 13, 1987	Bloomington, Minnesota	(Russia) HC Spartak Moscow (KHL)
97	D	Matt Gilroy – A	6 ft 2 in (188 cm)	203 lb (92 kg)	July 30, 1984	North Bellmore, New York	(Finland) Jokerit (KHL)

Preliminary round

Pos	Team	Pld	W	OTW	OTL	L	GF	GA	GD	Pts	Qualification
1	Olympic Athletes from Russia	3	2	0	0	1	14	5	+9	6	Quarterfinals
2	Slovenia	3	0	2	0	1	8	12	−4	4 (Note: Slovenia 4 Pts; USA 4 Pts; Slovakia 1 Pts. Slovenia defeated USA 3–2 in overtime.)	Qualification playoffs
3	United States	3	1	0	1	1	4	8	−4	4	Qualification playoffs
4	Slovakia	3	1	0	1	1	6	7	−1	4	Qualification playoffs

Source: IIHF
Notes:

14 February 2018; 21:10	United States	2–3 OT (1–0, 1–0, 0–2) (OT 0–1)	Slovenia	Kwandong Hockey Centre, Pyeongchang; Attendance: 3,348

Game reference

Ryan Zapolski
Goalies
Gašper Krošelj
Referees:
(Czech Republic) Jan Hribik
(Finland) Anssi Salonen
Linesmen:
(Switzerland) Roman Kaderli
(Germany) Lukas Kohlmüller

O'Neill (Roe, Donato) – 17:44	1–0
Greenway (O'Neill, Sanguinetti) – 32:57	2–0
	2–1	45:49 – Urbas (Gregorc, Vidmar)
	2–2	58:23 – Muršak (Gregorc, Verlič)
	2–3	60:38 – Muršak (Tičar, Urbas)

6 min
Penalties
6 min
36
Shots
25

16 February 2018; 12:10	United States	2–1 (1–1, 0–0, 1–0)	Slovakia	Gangneung Hockey Centre, Pyeongchang; Attendance: 5,652

Game reference

Ryan Zapolski
Goalies
Ján Laco
Referees:
(Canada) Olivier Gouin
(Switzerland) Tobias Wehrli
Linesmen:
(Switzerland) Nicolas Fluri
(Russia) Alexander Otmakhov

Donato (Terry, Bourque) (PP) – 07:10	1–0
	1–1	07:35 – Kudrna (Surový, Čajkovský)
Donato (Arcobello, Bourque) (PP) – 42:51	2–1

4 min
Penalties
10 min
31
Shots
22

17 February 2018; 21:10	Olympic Athletes from Russia	4–0 (1–0, 2–0, 1–0)	United States	Gangneung Hockey Centre, Pyeongchang; Attendance: 6,473

Game reference

Vasily Koshechkin
Goalies
Ryan Zapolski
Referees:
(Slovakia) Jozef Kubuš
(Sweden) Linus Öhlund
Linesmen:
(Czech Republic) Vít Lederer
(Switzerland) Nicolas Fluri

Prokhorkin (Mozyakin, Barabanov) – 07:21	1–0
Prokhorkin (Shirokov, Mozyakin) – 22:14	2–0
Kovalchuk (Andronov) – 39:59	3–0
Kovalchuk (Voynov, Andronov) – 40:28	4–0

10 min
Penalties
10 min
26
Shots
29

Qualification playoff

20 February 2018; 12:10	United States	5–1 (0–0, 3–1, 2–0)	Slovakia	Gangneung Hockey Centre, Pyeongchang; Attendance: 6,391

Game reference

Ryan Zapolski
Goalies
Ján Laco
Referees:
(Finland) Aleksi Rantala
(Finland) Anssi Salonen
Linesmen:
(Sweden) Henrik Pihlblad
(Finland) Sakari Suominen

Donato (Gilroy, Terry) – 21:36	1–0
Wisniewski (Terry) (PP2) – 22:20	2–0
Arcobello (Terry) – 33:30	3–0
	3–1	36:54 – Čerešňák (Graňák, Nagy)
Roe (Little, O'Neill) – 49:52	4–1
Donato (Wisniewski) (PP) – 56:46	5–1

8 min
Penalties
33 min
33
Shots
23

Quarterfinal

21 February 2018; 12:10	Czech Republic	3–2 GWS (1–1, 1–1, 0–0) (OT: 0–0) (SO: 1–0)	United States	Gangneung Hockey Centre, Pyeongchang; Attendance: 2,948

Game reference

Pavel Francouz
Goalies
Ryan Zapolski
Referees:
(Canada) Oliver Gouin
(Sweden) Linus Öhlund
Linesmen:
(Switzerland) Roman Kaderli
(Finland) Hannu Sormunen

	0–1	06:20 – Donato (Terry)
Kolář (Kovář) – 15:12	1–1
Kundrátek (Růžička, Mozík) – 28:14	2–1
	2–2	30:23 – Slater (O'Neill) (SH)

Růžička (miss)
Koukal
Kovář (miss)
Kubalík (miss)
Kundrátek (miss)
Shootout
(miss) Bourque
(miss) Donato
(miss) Arcobello
(miss) Terry
(miss) Butler
10 min
Penalties
8 min
29
Shots
20

=== Women's tournament ===
The United States women's national ice hockey team qualified by finishing 1st in the 2016 IIHF World Ranking.

Roster The following is the United States roster for the women's ice hockey tournament at the 2018 Winter Olympics.

Head coach: (United States) Robb Stauber Assistant coaches: (United States) Brett Strot, (United States) Paul Mara Video Coach: (United States) Nick Laurila

No.	Pos.	Name	Height	Weight	Birthdate	Birthplace	2017–18 team
2	D	Lee Stecklein	6 ft 0 in (1.83 m)	174 lb (79 kg)	23 April 1994 (aged 23)	Roseville, Minnesota	(United States) Univ. of Minnesota
3	D	Cayla Barnes	5 ft 1 in (1.55 m)	146 lb (66 kg)	7 January 1999 (aged 19)	Corona, California	(United States) Boston College
5	D	Megan Keller	5 ft 11 in (1.80 m)	161 lb (73 kg)	1 May 1996 (aged 21)	Farmington Hills, Michigan	(United States) Boston College
6	D	Kali Flanagan	5 ft 4 in (1.63 m)	141 lb (64 kg)	19 September 1995 (aged 22)	Hudson, New Hampshire	(United States) Boston College
7	F	Monique Lamoureux-Morando	5 ft 6 in (1.68 m)	148 lb (67 kg)	3 July 1989 (aged 28)	Grand Forks, North Dakota	(United States) Minnesota Whitecaps
8	D	Emily Pfalzer	5 ft 3 in (1.60 m)	126 lb (57 kg)	14 June 1993 (aged 24)	Buffalo, New York	(United States) Buffalo Beauts
10	F	Meghan Duggan – C	5 ft 10 in (1.78 m)	163 lb (74 kg)	3 September 1987 (aged 30)	Danvers, Massachusetts	(United States) Boston Pride
11	F	Haley Skarupa	5 ft 6 in (1.68 m)	141 lb (64 kg)	3 January 1994 (aged 24)	Rockville, Maryland	(United States) Boston Pride
12	F	Kelly Pannek	5 ft 8 in (1.73 m)	165 lb (75 kg)	29 December 1995 (aged 22)	Plymouth, Minnesota	(United States) Univ. of Minnesota
14	F	Brianna Decker – A	5 ft 4 in (1.63 m)	150 lb (68 kg)	13 May 1991 (aged 26)	Dousman, Wisconsin	(United States) Boston Pride
17	F	Jocelyne Lamoureux-Davidson	5 ft 6 in (1.68 m)	150 lb (68 kg)	3 July 1989 (aged 28)	Grand Forks, North Dakota	(United States) Minnesota Whitecaps
19	F	Gigi Marvin	5 ft 8 in (1.73 m)	159 lb (72 kg)	7 March 1987 (aged 30)	Warroad, Minnesota	(United States) Boston Pride
20	F	Hannah Brandt	5 ft 6 in (1.68 m)	150 lb (68 kg)	27 November 1993 (aged 24)	Vadnais Heights, Minnesota	(United States) Minnesota Whitecaps
21	F	Hilary Knight	5 ft 11 in (1.80 m)	174 lb (79 kg)	12 July 1989 (aged 28)	Sun Valley, Idaho	(United States) Boston Pride
22	D	Kacey Bellamy – A	5 ft 7 in (1.70 m)	146 lb (66 kg)	22 April 1987 (aged 30)	Westfield, Massachusetts	(United States) Boston Pride
23	D	Sidney Morin	5 ft 5 in (1.65 m)	128 lb (58 kg)	6 June 1995 (aged 22)	Minnetonka, Minnesota	(Sweden) Modo Hockey
24	F	Dani Cameranesi	5 ft 5 in (1.65 m)	148 lb (67 kg)	30 June 1995 (aged 22)	Plymouth, Minnesota	(United States) Univ. of Minnesota
26	F	Kendall Coyne	5 ft 2 in (1.57 m)	123 lb (56 kg)	25 May 1992 (aged 25)	Palos Heights, Illinois	(United States) Minnesota Whitecaps
28	F	Amanda Kessel	5 ft 5 in (1.65 m)	137 lb (62 kg)	28 August 1991 (aged 26)	Madison, Wisconsin	(United States) Metropolitan Riveters
29	G	Nicole Hensley	5 ft 7 in (1.70 m)	154 lb (70 kg)	23 June 1994 (aged 23)	Lakewood, Colorado	(United States) Lindenwood Univ.
33	G	Alex Rigsby	5 ft 7 in (1.70 m)	150 lb (68 kg)	3 January 1992 (aged 26)	Delafield, Wisconsin	(United States) Minnesota Whitecaps
35	G	Maddie Rooney	5 ft 5 in (1.65 m)	146 lb (66 kg)	1 July 1997 (aged 20)	Andover, Minnesota	(United States) Univ. of Minnesota Duluth
37	F	Amanda Pelkey	5 ft 3 in (1.60 m)	134 lb (61 kg)	29 May 1993 (aged 24)	Montpelier, Vermont	(United States) Boston Pride

Preliminary round

Pos	Team	Pld	W	OTW	OTL	L	GF	GA	GD	Pts	Qualification
1	Canada	3	3	0	0	0	11	2	+9	9	Semifinals
2	United States	3	2	0	0	1	9	3	+6	6	Semifinals
3	Finland	3	1	0	0	2	7	8	−1	3	Quarterfinals
4	Olympic Athletes from Russia	3	0	0	0	3	1	15	−14	0	Quarterfinals

Source: IIHF

11 February 2018; 16:40	Finland	1–3 (1–0, 0–2, 0–1)	United States	Kwandong Hockey Centre, Gangneung; Attendance: 4,032

Game reference

Noora Räty
Goalies
Maddie Rooney
Referees:
(Germany) Nicole Hertrich
(Norway) Aina Hove
Linesmen:
(France) Charlotte Girard-Fabre
(Sweden) Veronica Johansson

Hovi (Nieminen, Välimäki) – 19:54	1–0
	1–1	28:58 – Lamoureux-Morando
	1–2	31:29 – Coyne (Knight, Decker)
	1–3	59:47 – Cameranesi (Keller) (ENG)

8 min
Penalties
4 min
24
Shots
42

13 February 2018; 21:10	United States	5–0 (1–0, 3–0, 1–0)	Olympic Athletes from Russia	Kwandong Hockey Centre, Gangneung; Attendance: 3,797

Game reference

Nicole Hensley
Goalies
Valeria Tarakanova
Nadezhda Morozova
Referees:
(Canada) Gabrielle Ariano-Lortie
(Sweden) Gabriella Gran
Linesmen:
(Czech Republic) Zuzana Svobodová
(Finland) Johanna Tauriainen

Bellamy (Lamoureux-Davidson, Marvin) – 08:02	1–0
Lamoureux-Davidson (Lamoureux-Morando) – 31:46	2–0
Lamoureux-Davidson – 31:52	3–0
Marvin (Pelkey, Duggan) – 34:38	4–0
Brandt (Cameranesi, Keller) – 58:23	5–0

2 min
Penalties
6 min
50
Shots
13

15 February 2018; 12:10	United States	1–2 (0–0, 0–2, 1–0)	Canada	Kwandong Hockey Centre, Gangneung; Attendance: 3,885

Game reference

Maddie Rooney
Goalies
Geneviève Lacasse
Referees:
(Norway) Aina Hove
(Sweden) Katarina Timglas
Linesmen:
(Finland) Jenni Heikkinen
(Sweden) Veronica Johansson

	0–1	27:18 – Agosta (Spooner, Jenner) (PP)
	0–2	34:56 – Nurse (Larocque)
Coyne (Decker) – 40:23	1–2

12 min
Penalties
8 min
45
Shots
23

Semifinal

19 February 2018; 13:10	United States	5−0 (2−0, 2−0, 1−0)	Finland	Gangneung Hockey Centre, Gangneung; Attendance: 5,173

Game reference

Maddie Rooney
Goalies
Noora Räty
Referees:
(Slovakia) Nikoleta Celárová
(Germany) Nicole Hertrich
Linesmen:
(Slovenia) Nataša Pagon
(Canada) Justine Todd

Marvin (Duggan, Pelkey) − 02:25	1−0
Cameranesi − 18:38	2−0
Lamoureux-Davidson (Pannek, Cameranesi) (PP2) – 33:21	3−0
Knight (Morin, Coyne) (PP) − 33:55	4−0
Cameranesi (Brandt, Kessel) (PP) – 40:45	5–0

6 min
Penalties
12 min
38
Shots
14

Gold medal game

22 February 2018; 13:10	(silver) Canada	2–3 GWS (0–1, 2–0, 0–1) (OT: 0–0) (SO: 0–1)	United States (gold)	Gangneung Hockey Centre, Gangneung; Attendance: 4,467

Game reference

Shannon Szabados
Goalies
Maddie Rooney
Referees:
(Germany) Nicole Hertrich
(Sweden) Katarina Timglas
Linesmen:
(Germany) Lisa Linnek
(Finland) Johanna Tauriainen

	0–1	19:34 – Knight (Morin, Decker) (PP)
Irwin (Turnbull) – 22:00	1–1
Poulin (Agosta, Daoust) – 26:55	2–1
	2–2	53:39 – Lamoureux-Morando (Pannek)

Spooner (miss)
Agosta
Poulin (miss)
Daoust
Jenner (miss)
Agosta (miss)
Shootout
Marvin
(miss) Brandt
(miss) Pfalzer
Kessel
(miss) Knight
Lamoureux-Davidson
12 min
Penalties
6 min
31
Shots
42

== Luge ==
Based on the results from the World Cups during the 2017–18 Luge World Cup season, the United States qualified 8 sleds.

Men

Athlete	Event	Run 1		Run 2		Run 3		Run 4		Total	
Athlete	Event	Time	Rank	Time	Rank	Time	Rank	Time	Rank	Time	Rank
Chris Mazdzer	Singles	47.800	5	47.717	2	47.534	1	47.677	7	3:10.728	2nd place, silver medalist(s)
Taylor Morris	Singles	48.072	15	48.793	32	47.858	13	47.824	9	3:12.547	18
Tucker West	Singles	48.848	26	47.942	15	49.593	37	Eliminated		2:26.019	26

Women

Athlete	Event	Run 1		Run 2		Run 3		Run 4		Total	
Athlete	Event	Time	Rank	Time	Rank	Time	Rank	Time	Rank	Time	Rank
Summer Britcher	Singles	46.829	15	46.132	1	46.603	8	48.770	19	3:08.334	19
Erin Hamlin	Singles	46.357	6	46.333	5	46.506	5	46.716	8	3:05.912	6
Emily Sweeney	Singles	46.595	11	46.9602	23	46.917	16	DNF			

Mixed/Open

Athlete	Event	Run 1		Run 2		Run 3		Total	
Athlete	Event	Time	Rank	Time	Rank	Time	Rank	Time	Rank
Justin Krewson; Andrew Sherk	Doubles	46.310	7	46.342	10	—N/a		1:32.652	8
Matt Mortensen; Jayson Terdiman	Doubles	46.244	6	46.443	13	—N/a		1:32.687	10
Summer Britcher; Chris Mazdzer; Matt Mortensen; Jayson Terdiman	Team relay	47.266	7	48.660	2	49.165	5	2:25.091	4

== Nordic combined ==
On January 25 Ben Berend received news that he would be the fifth American qualifier.

Athlete	Event	Ski jumping			Cross-country		Total	
Athlete	Event	Distance	Points	Rank	Time	Rank	Time	Rank
Bryan Fletcher	Normal hill/10 km	97.5	99.0	18	24:57.6	22	27:03.6	17
Taylor Fletcher	Normal hill/10 km	86.0	76.4	39	24:42.2	15	28:19.2	35
Jasper Good	Normal hill/10 km	76.0	58.8	47	25:52.8	39	30:39.8	45
Ben Loomis	Normal hill/10 km	86.5	79.5	37	25:56.8	40	29:20.8	41
Ben Berend	Large hill/10 km	124.0	105.8	24	26:08.7	44	28:20.7	39
Bryan Fletcher	Large hill/10 km	120.5	107.8	23	23:31.4	10	25:35.4	17
Jasper Good	Large hill/10 km	109.5	75.7	46	25:17.7	39	29:42.7	43
Ben Loomis	Large hill/10 km	114.5	81.6	43	24:42.3	35	28:31.3	40
Ben Berend; Bryan Fletcher; Taylor Fletcher; Ben Loomis	Team large hill/4×5 km	461.0	324.8	9	48:13.5	9	51:26.5	10

== Short track speed skating ==
According to the ISU Special Olympic Qualification Rankings, United States qualified a total of 8 athletes.

Men

Athlete	Event	Heats		Quarterfinal		Semifinal		Final	
Athlete	Event	Time	Rank	Time	Rank	Time	Rank	Position	Rank
John-Henry Krueger	500 m	41.008	4	Did not advance					
Thomas Hong	500 m	43.096	3	Did not advance					
Aaron Tran	500 m	DSQ		Did not advance					
J. R. Celski	1000 m	1:31.812	3	Did not advance					
John-Henry Krueger	1000 m	1:25.913	1 Q	1:24.598	3 ADV	1:24.187	1 FA	1:24.864	2nd place, silver medalist(s)
J. R. Celski	1500 m	2:19.028	3 Q	—N/a		DSQ		Did not advance	
John-Henry Krueger	1500 m	2:15.671	1 Q	—N/a		DSQ		Did not advance	
Aaron Tran	1500 m	2:14.133	3 Q	—N/a		2:13.487	4 FB	2:27.127	12
J. R. Celski; John-Henry Krueger; Thomas Hong; Aaron Tran	5000 m relay	—N/a				6:36.867	3 FB	6:52.708	5

Qualification legend: ADV – Advanced due to being impeded by another skater; FA – Qualify to medal round; FB – Qualify to consolation round.

Women

Athlete	Event	Heats		Quarterfinal		Semifinal		Final	
Athlete	Event	Time	Rank	Time	Rank	Time	Rank	Position	Rank
Maame Biney	500 m	43.665	2 Q	44.772	4	Did not advance			
Lana Gehring	500 m	43.825	3	Did not advance					
Lana Gehring	1000 m	DSQ		Did not advance					
Jessica Kooreman	1000 m	1:31.657	3	Did not advance					
Maame Biney	1500 m	2:31.819	6	—N/a		Did not advance			
Lana Gehring	1500 m	2:27.336	5	—N/a		Did not advance			
Jessica Kooreman	1500 m	DSQ		—N/a		Did not advance			

Qualification legend: ADV – Advanced due to being impeded by another skater; FA – Qualify to medal round; FB – Qualify to consolation round

== Skeleton ==
Based on the world rankings, the United States qualified 4 sleds.

Athlete	Event	Run 1		Run 2		Run 3		Run 4		Total	
Athlete	Event	Time	Rank	Time	Rank	Time	Rank	Time	Rank	Time	Rank
Matthew Antoine	Men's	51.16	12	50.98	8	50.91	9	51.34	14	3:24.39	11
John Daly	Men's	51.23	13	51.15	13	51.33	18	51.64	19	3:25.35	16
Katie Uhlaender	Women's	52.33	8	52.40	13	52.33	12	52.55	14	3:29.61	13
Kendall Wesenberg	Women's	52.77	17	52.96	17	52.54	16	52.65	=15	3:30.92	17

== Ski jumping ==
Men

Athlete	Event	Qualification			First round			Final			Total	
Athlete	Event	Distance	Points	Rank	Distance	Points	Rank	Distance	Points	Rank	Points	Rank
Kevin Bickner	Normal hill	98.0	114.0	25 Q	109.0	117.2	14 Q	98.5	100.2	=24	217.4	18
Michael Glasder	Normal hill	91.5	94.6	40 Q	98.5	98.7	32	Did not advance				
Casey Larson	Normal hill	88.0	90.9	46 Q	97.0	89.4	39	Did not advance				
William Rhoads	Normal hill	88.5	91.9	45 Q	87.0	75.5	46	Did not advance				
Kevin Bickner	Large hill	122.5	91.1	35 Q	129.5	121.9	20 Q	124.0	113.5	23	235.4	20
Michael Glasder	Large hill	124.5	88.7	38 Q	114.0	93.2	46	Did not advance				
Casey Larson	Large hill	104.5	61.1	53	Did not advance							
William Rhoads	Large hill	115.0	67.9	51	Did not advance							
Kevin Bickner; Michael Glasder; Casey Larson; William Rhoads	Team large hill	—N/a			463.0	377.2	9	Did not advance				

Women

Athlete	Event	First round			Final			Total	
Athlete	Event	Distance	Points	Rank	Distance	Points	Rank	Points	Rank
Nita Englund	Normal hill	77.0	57.9	31	Did not advance				
Sarah Hendrickson	Normal hill	86.0	76.7	23 Q	88.0	83.9	21	160.6	19
Abby Ringquist	Normal hill	77.5	62.0	30 Q	91.0	82.4	23	144.4	29

== Snowboarding ==
Freestyle
Men

Athlete	Event	Qualification				Final				
Athlete	Event	Run 1	Run 2	Best	Rank	Run 1	Run 2	Run 3	Total	Rank
Chris Corning	Big air	85.00	88.00	88.00	4 Q	74.25	78.75	JNS	153.00	4
Red Gerard	Big air	82.00	85.00	85.00	6 Q	74.75	JNS	68.25	143.00	5
Kyle Mack	Big air	87.25	88.75	88.75	3 Q	82.00	86.75	JNS	168.75	2nd place, silver medalist(s)
Ryan Stassel	Big air	39.50	76.25	76.25	13	Did not advance				
Ben Ferguson	Halfpipe	91.00	89.75	91.00	4 Q	43.00	83.50	90.75	90.75	4
Chase Josey	Halfpipe	47.75	83.75	83.75	7 Q	87.75	52.25	88.00	88.00	6
Jake Pates	Halfpipe	59.50	82.25	82.25	8 Q	47.00	82.25	27.00	82.25	8
Shaun White	Halfpipe	93.25	98.50	98.50	1 Q	94.25	55.00	97.75	97.75	1st place, gold medalist(s)
Chris Corning	Slopestyle	70.85	69.86	70.85	9	Did not advance				
Red Gerard	Slopestyle	82.55	57.11	82.55	3 Q	43.33	46.40	87.16	87.16	1st place, gold medalist(s)
Kyle Mack	Slopestyle	45.26	53.55	53.55	11	Did not advance				
Ryan Stassel	Slopestyle	23.50	22.63	23.50	17	Did not advance				

Women

Athlete	Event	Qualification				Final				
Athlete	Event	Run 1	Run 2	Best	Rank	Run 1	Run 2	Run 3	Best	Rank
Jamie Anderson	Big air	30.25	90.00	90.00	6 Q	90.00	87.25	JNS	177.25	2nd place, silver medalist(s)
Jessika Jenson	Big air	76.25	39.75	76.25	12 Q	JNS	21.50	19.00	40.50	11
Hailey Langland	Big air	73.00	29.00	73.00	14	Did not advance				
Julia Marino	Big air	83.75	85.25	85.25	9 Q	JNS	74.50	18.75	93.25	10
Kelly Clark	Halfpipe	41.00	63.25	63.25	11 Q	76.25	81.75	83.50	83.50	4
Arielle Gold	Halfpipe	17.50	62.75	62.75	12 Q	10.50	74.75	85.75	85.75	3rd place, bronze medalist(s)
Chloe Kim	Halfpipe	91.50	95.50	95.50	1 Q	93.75	41.50	98.25	98.25	1st place, gold medalist(s)
Maddie Mastro	Halfpipe	83.75	76.00	83.75	4 Q	14.00	7.50	6.50	14.00	12
Jamie Anderson	Slopestyle	CAN				83.00	34.56	CAN	83.00	1st place, gold medalist(s)
Jessika Jenson	Slopestyle	CAN				72.26	41.11	CAN	72.26	5
Hailey Langland	Slopestyle	CAN				41.26	71.80	CAN	71.80	6
Julia Marino	Slopestyle	CAN				55.85	41.05	CAN	55.85	11

Parallel

Athlete	Event	Qualification		Round of 16	Quarterfinal	Semifinal	Final	
Athlete	Event	Time	Rank	Opposition Time	Opposition Time	Opposition Time	Opposition Time	Rank
AJ Muss	Men's giant slalom	1:26.10	20	Did not advance				
Mike Trapp	Men's giant slalom	1:28.14	30	Did not advance				

Snowboard cross
Men

Athlete	Event	Seeding						1/8 final	Quarterfinal	Semifinal	Final	
Athlete	Event	Run 1		Run 2		Best	Seed	1/8 final	Quarterfinal	Semifinal	Final	
Athlete	Event	Time	Rank	Time	Rank	Best	Seed	Position	Position	Position	Position	Rank
Nick Baumgartner	Snowboard cross	1:14.46	15	Bye		1:14.46	15	2 Q	2 Q	2 FA	4	4
Jonathan Cheever	Snowboard cross	1:14.72	19	Bye		1:14.72	19	4	Did not advance			
Mick Dierdorff	Snowboard cross	1:15.47	26	1:14.52	3	1:14.52	27	1 Q	2 Q	3 FA	5	5
Hagen Kearney	Snowboard cross	1:13.94	6	Bye		1:13.94	6	1 Q	4	Did not advance		

Qualification legend: FA – Qualify to medal round; FB – Qualify to consolation round

Women

Athlete	Event	Seeding						1/8 final	Quarterfinal	Semifinal	Final	
Athlete	Event	Run 1		Run 2		Best	Seed	1/8 final	Quarterfinal	Semifinal	Final	
Athlete	Event	Time	Rank	Time	Rank	Best	Seed	Position	Position	Position	Position	Rank
Faye Gulini	Snowboard cross	1:17.74	3	Bye		1:17.74	3	—N/a	6	Did not advance		
Lindsey Jacobellis	Snowboard cross	1:18.05	4	Bye		1:18.05	4	—N/a	1 Q	2 FA	4	4
Meghan Tierney	Snowboard cross	1:20.52	11	Bye		1:20.52	11	—N/a	5	Did not advance		

Qualification legend: FA – Qualify to medal round; FB – Qualify to consolation round

== Speed skating ==
Distance
Men

Athlete	Event	Race	
Athlete	Event	Time	Rank
Jonathan Garcia	500 m	35.31	23
Kimani Griffin	500 m	35.38	26
Mitchell Whitmore	500 m	35.13	15
Shani Davis	1000 m	1:08.78	7
Joey Mantia	1000 m	1:08.564	4
Mitchell Whitmore	1000 m	1:09.17	10
Shani Davis	1500 m	1:46.74	19
Brian Hansen	1500 m	1:46.44	15
Joey Mantia	1500 m	1:45.86	8
Emery Lehman	5000 m	6:31.16	21

Women

Athlete	Event	Race	
Athlete	Event	Time	Rank
Heather Bergsma	500 m	38.13	11
Brittany Bowe	500 m	37.530	5
Erin Jackson	500 m	39.20	24
Heather Bergsma	1000 m	1:15.15	8
Brittany Bowe	1000 m	1:14.36	4
Jerica Tandiman	1000 m	1:18.02	28
Heather Bergsma	1500 m	1:56.74	8
Brittany Bowe	1500 m	1:55.54	5
Mia Manganello	1500 m	1:59.93	22
Carlijn Schoutens	3000 m	4:15.60	22
Carlijn Schoutens	5000 m	7:13.28	11

Mass start

Athlete	Event	Semifinal			Final		
Athlete	Event	Points	Time	Rank	Points	Time	Rank
Brian Hansen	Men's mass start	1	8:34.47	10	Did not advance		
Joey Mantia	Men's mass start	3	8:00.54	8 Q	0	7:45.21	9
Heather Bergsma	Women's mass start	5	8:38.19	5 Q	0	8:35.80	11
Mia Manganello	Women's mass start	1	8:54.52	7 Q	0	8:54.40	15

Team pursuit

Athlete	Event	Quarterfinal		Semifinal		Final / BM / PF	
Athlete	Event	Opposition Time	Rank	Opposition Time	Rank	Opposition Time	Rank
Jonathan Garcia; Brian Hansen; Emery Lehman; Joey Mantia	Men's team pursuit	Netherlands; L 3:42.98	8 FD	Did not advance		Canada; L 3:50.77	8
Heather Bergsma; Brittany Bowe; Mia Manganello; Carlijn Schoutens	Women's team pursuit	Poland; W 2:59.75	4 Q	Netherlands; L 3:07.28	2 FB	Canada; W 2:59.27	3rd place, bronze medalist(s)

Qualification legend: FA – Qualify to gold medal final; FB – Qualify to bronze medal final; FC – Qualify to 5th place final; FD – Qualify to 7th place final

== Events ==
=== Potential withdrawal ===
In early December 2017, United States Ambassador to the United Nations, Nikki Haley, told Fox News that it was an "open question" whether the United States was going to participate in the games, citing security concerns in the region. However, days later the White House Press Secretary, Sarah Huckabee Sanders, stated that the United States "looks forward to participating" and will attend. Concerns were later assuaged.

=== Coin toss controversy ===
Luge athlete Erin Hamlin carried the flag during the opening ceremony. Following a vote, which ended up in a 4-4 tie between Hamlin and speed skater Shani Davis, the winner was decided via a coin toss in accordance with the rules. Davis eventually skipped the opening ceremony, citing his training schedule.

== See also ==
- United States at the 2018 Winter Paralympics
- United States at the 2018 Summer Youth Olympics
