= Adrian Pertl =

Austrian alpine skier

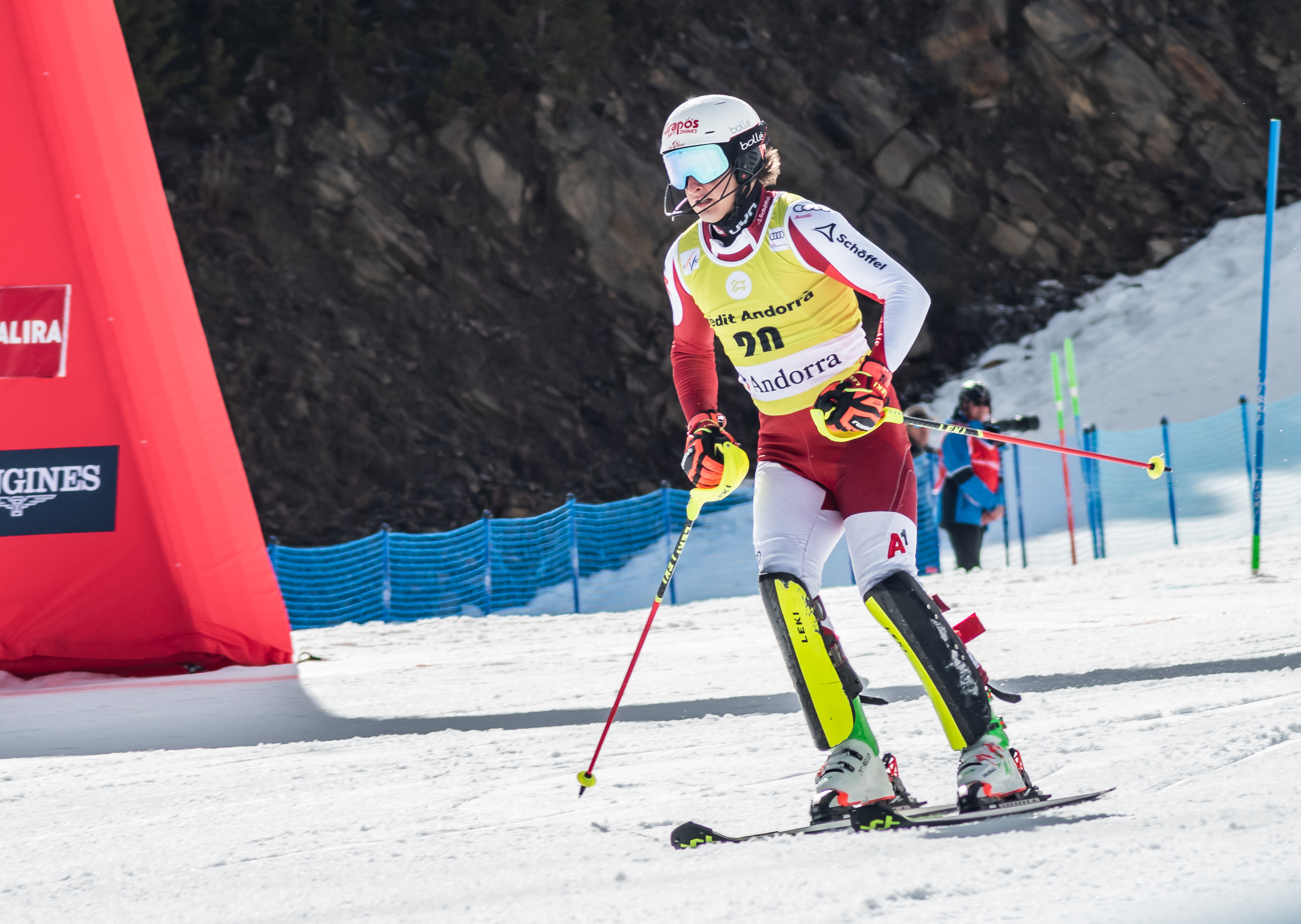
- Pertl in 2023

Personal information
- Born: 22 April 1996 (age 30) Sankt Veit an der Glan, Carinthia, Austria

Skiing career
- Sport: Alpine skiing
- Club: WSV Reichenau-Turracherhöhe-Kaer
- Disciplines: Slalom, giant slalom
- World Cup debut: 23 January 2018 (age 21)

Olympics
- Teams: 0

World Championships
- Teams: 2 – (2021, 2023)
- Medals: 1 (0 gold)

World Cup
- Seasons: 3 – (2018, 2020–2021)
- Wins: 0
- Podiums: 1 – (1 SL)
- Overall titles: 0 – (30th in 2021)
- Discipline titles: 0 – (15th in SL, 2021)
Medal record
Men's alpine skiing
Representing Austria
World Championships
| Silver medal – second place | 2021 Cortina d’Ampezzo | Slalom |
Junior World Championships
| Gold medal – first place | 2017 Åre | Slalom |

Adrian Pertl (born 22 April 1996) is an Austrian World Cup alpine ski racer, and specializes in slalom. At his first World Championships in 2021, he was the silver medalist in slalom.

== Biography ==
Born in Sankt Veit an der Glan, Carinthia, Pertl was junior world champion in 2017 in slalom at Åre, Sweden. He made his World Cup debut in January 2018 at Schladming, and gained his first podium in February 2020 at Chamonix, France.

In February 2021, Pertl achieved his greatest success to date by winning the silver medal in the slalom at the World Championships in Cortina d'Ampezzo, Italy.

== World Cup results ==
=== Season standings ===
| Season | Age | Overall | Slalom | Giant slalom | Super-G | Downhill | Combined | Parallel |
|---|---|---|---|---|---|---|---|---|
| 2020 | 23 | 76 | 23 | — | — | — | — | — |
| 2021 | 24 | 30 | 15 | 37 | — | — | —N/a | 4 |
| 2022 | 25 | 104 | — | — | — | — | —N/a | 6 |
| 2023 | 26 | 52 | 19 | — | — | — | —N/a | —N/a |

Standings through 5 February 2023

=== Race podiums ===
- 0 wins
- 1 podium – (1 SL); 8 top tens

| Season | Date | Location | Discipline | Place |
|---|---|---|---|---|
| 2020 | 8 Feb 2020 | Chamonix, France | Slalom | 3rd |

== World Championship results ==
| Year | Age | Slalom | Giant slalom | Super-G | Downhill | Combined | Parallel | Team event |
|---|---|---|---|---|---|---|---|---|
| 2021 | 24 | 2 | — | — | — | — | DNF | 5 |
| 2023 | 26 | 12 | — | — | — | — | 4 | — |
