= Tyler Kornfield =

American cross-country skier

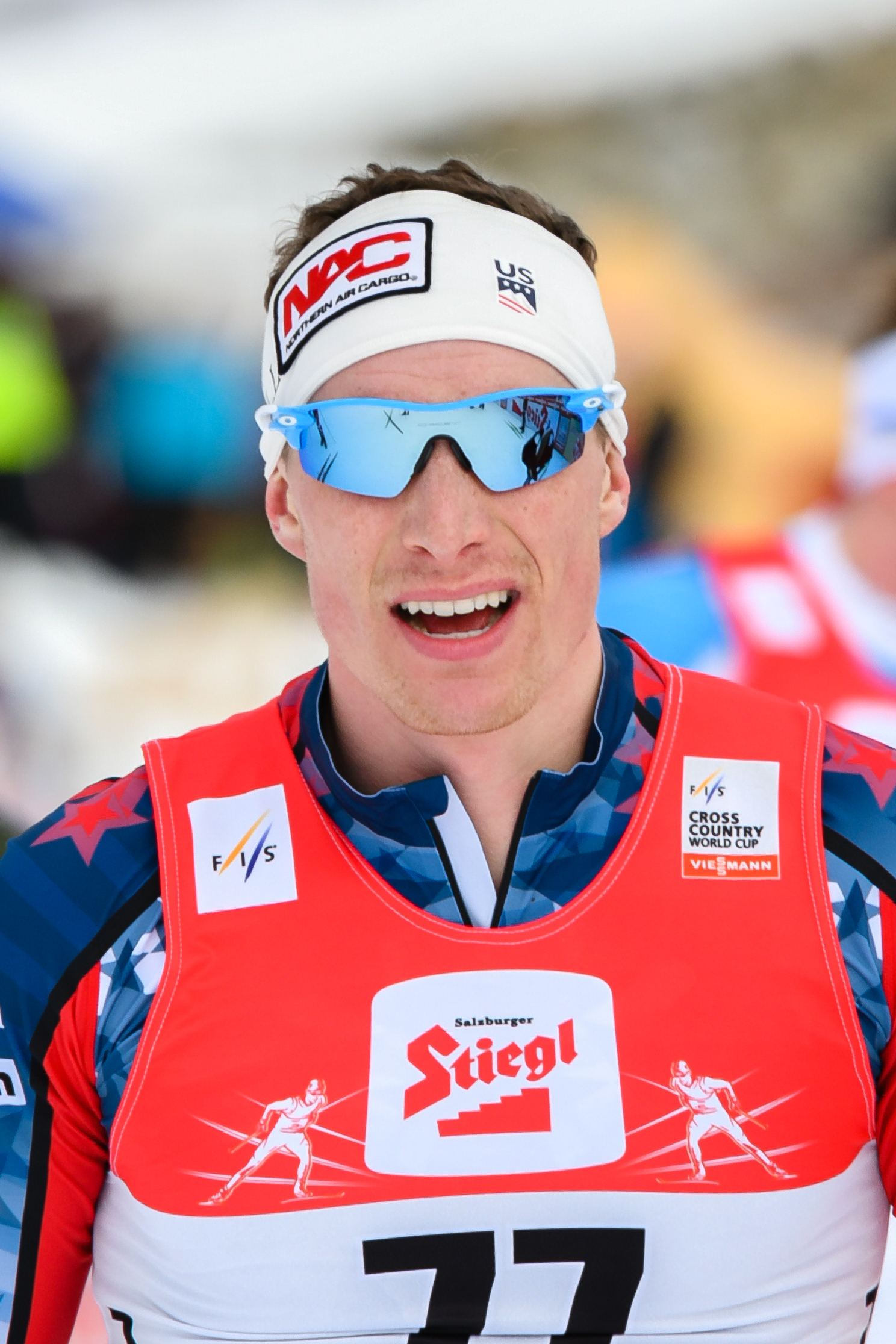
- Tyler Kornfield in 2018

Personal information
- Nationality: American
- Born: February 9, 1991 (age 35) Anchorage, Alaska
- Education: University of Alaska Fairbanks
- Height: 6 ft 1.5 in (187 cm)
- Weight: 190 lb (86 kg)
- Website: tylerkornfield.com

Sport
- Country: United States
- Sport: Cross-country skiing
- Events: 15 km Freestyle, SP 1 km, SP 1.5 km, SP 1.6 km, 30 km Classic, 50 km Classic
- Club: Alaska Pacific Nordic Center
- Coached by: Club coach - Erik Flora; Team USA coach - Chris Grover.

Tyler Kornfield (born February 9, 1991) is an American Olympic cross-country skier.

== Early and personal life ==
Kornfield was born and raised in Anchorage, Alaska, the son of Ed and Robin Kornfield. His father was originally from Philadelphia, Pennsylvania, moved to Alaska in 1978, and worked for the United States Department of the Interior, Office of Aviation Services (OAS), as Chief of Fleet Services. He has a sister, named Tamra.

He attended high school at Service High School in Anchorage, graduating in 2009. He then attended that University of Alaska Fairbanks in Fairbanks, Alaska, graduating in 2013 with a degree in mechanical engineering.

== Skiing career ==
Kornfield began skiing at age three. His club is the Alaska Pacific Nordic Center. His club coach is Erik Flora, and his Team USA national coach is Chris Grover. He competed for the University of Alaska Fairbanks Nanooks in both Nordic skiing and cross-country running.

In 2009, he was Alaska state champion in the 7.5k classic race. In January 2010, Kornfield came in second in the US National Championships Spring (SP) 1.5 km race. In January 2012, he won the US National Championships SP 1 km race.

At the 2013 Fédération Internationale de Ski (FIS) U23 World Championships, Kornfield came in 19th in sprint freestyle. In January 2015, he took second at the US National Championships SP 1 km race. In February 2017, Kornfield won the US Super Tour SP 1.6 km race. In January 2018, he won the US National Championships Classic 30 km race.

Kornfield competed for the United States at the 2018 Winter Olympics in the men's 15 kilometre freestyle, coming in 74th out of 119 competitors and in the Men's 50 kilometer classic, coming in 48 out of 69 competitors.
