= Biathlon World Championships 2017 – Women's mass start =

Women's mass start at the Biathlon World Championships 2017
- Location: Hochfilzen, Austria
- Dates: 19 February
- Competitors: 30 from 15 nations
- Winning time: 33:13.8

Medalists
gold medal	Laura Dahlmeier	Germany
silver medal	Susan Dunklee	United States
bronze medal	Kaisa Mäkäräinen	Finland

The Women's mass start competition at the 2017 World Championships was held on 19 February 2017.

== Results ==
The race was started at 11:30.

Rank	Bib	Name	Nationality	Penalties (P+P+S+S)	Time	Deficit
1st place, gold medalist(s)	2	Laura Dahlmeier	Germany	0 (0+0+0+0)	33:13.8	
2nd place, silver medalist(s)	17	Susan Dunklee	United States	0 (0+0+0+0)	33:18.4	+4.6
3rd place, bronze medalist(s)	6	Kaisa Mäkäräinen	Finland	1 (1+0+0+0)	33:33.9	+20.1
4	1	Gabriela Koukalová	Czech Republic	1 (0+0+0+1)	33:37.8	+24.0
5	26	Teja Gregorin	Slovenia	1 (0+1+0+0)	33:38.0	+24.2
6	13	Yuliia Dzhima	Ukraine	1 (0+1+0+0)	33:38.2	+24.4
7	7	Marie Dorin Habert	France	1 (0+0+0+1)	33:54.1	+40.3
8	8	Dorothea Wierer	Italy	2 (0+0+1+1)	34:19.4	+1:05.6
9	5	Alexia Runggaldier	Italy	0 (0+0+0+0)	34:20.7	+1:06.9
10	25	Paulína Fialková	Slovakia	2 (0+1+1+0)	34:27.9	+1:14.1
11	19	Lisa Vittozzi	Italy	0 (0+0+0+0)	34:28.6	+1:14.8
12	28	Tiril Eckhoff	Norway	4 (0+2+2+0)	34:30.0	+1:16.2
13	4	Anaïs Chevalier	France	1 (1+0+0+0)	34:37.8	+1:24.0
14	20	Anastasiya Merkushyna	Ukraine	1 (1+0+0+0)	34:42.5	+1:28.7
15	24	Irina Starykh	Russia	2 (1+0+1+0)	34:50.8	+1:37.0
16	23	Nadezhda Skardino	Belarus	1 (0+1+0+0)	35:01.3	+1:47.5
17	18	Célia Aymonier	France	4 (0+1+2+1)	35:03.6	+1:49.8
18	27	Selina Gasparin	Switzerland	3 (2+0+0+1)	35:10.6	+1:56.8
19	3	Darya Domracheva	Belarus	4 (0+3+1+0)	35:30.5	+2:16.7
20	14	Vanessa Hinz	Germany	3 (0+3+0+0)	35:47.1	+2:33.3
21	21	Federica Sanfilippo	Italy	5 (0+0+3+2)	35:52.2	+2:38.4
22	22	Anastasiya Kuzmina	Slovakia	4 (1+2+1+0)	35:52.3	+2:38.5
23	12	Tatiana Akimova	Russia	5 (0+2+1+2)	35:57.2	+2:43.4
24	30	Clare Egan	United States	4 (1+0+1+2)	36:17.9	+3:04.1
25	16	Lisa Hauser	Austria	6 (2+3+1+0)	36:32.6	+3:18.8
26	11	Eva Puskarčíková	Czech Republic	5 (2+2+1+0)	36:42.3	+3:28.5
27	9	Franziska Hildebrand	Germany	2 (0+2+0+0)	36:54.4	+3:40.6
28	10	Justine Braisaz	France	9 (1+1+2+5)	37:03.8	+3:50.0
29	15	Marte Olsbu	Norway	6 (1+2+2+1)	37:47.6	+4:33.8
30	29	Ekaterina Avvakumova	South Korea	5 (0+2+3+0)	38:00.7	+4:46.9
