= Chiara Mair =

Austrian alpine skier

Personal information
- Born: 31 August 1996 (age 29) Innsbruck, Austria

Skiing career
- Sport: Alpine skiing
- Club: SK Götzens
- Retired: 2024
- Disciplines: Technical events
- World Cup debut: 2019

World Cup
- Seasons: 8 - (2016-2023)
- Podiums: 0
Medal record
Women's alpine skiing
Representing Austria
World Junior Championships
Bronze medal – third place	2017 Åre	Slalom
Bronze medal – third place	2017 Åre	Giant slalom

Chiara Mair (born 31 August 1996) is a retired Austrian alpine skier.

== Career ==
In her career she won two medals at youth level at the World Junior Alpine Skiing Championships 2017. Her best result in the World Cup is a 4th place in Slalom in Schladming in January 2022. In April 2024, she announced her retirement from competitive sports as a result of several injury lay-offs.
