= World Junior Alpine Skiing Championships 2017 =

International skiing competition

The World Junior Alpine Skiing Championships 2017 were the 36th World Junior Alpine Skiing Championships, held between 6–14 March 2017 in Åre, Sweden.

== Medal winners ==
=== Men's events ===
Event	Gold		Silver		Bronze	
Downhill	Sam Morse; United States	1:23.34	Alexander Prast; Italy	1:23.72	Raphael Haaser; Austria	1:23.84
Super-G	Nils Alphand; France	1:17.91	Raphael Haaser; Austria	1:17.92	Semyel Bissg; Switzerland	1:17.93
Giant Slalom	Loïc Meillard; Switzerland	2:25.23	Timon Haugan; Norway	2:25.80	Victor Guillot; France	2:26.11
Slalom	Adrian Pertl; Austria	1:37.64	Bjørn Brudevoll; Norway	1:37.80	Simon Efimov; Russia	1:38.26
Combined	Loïc Meillard; Switzerland	2:05.14	River Radamus; United States	2:06.68	Georg Hegele; Germany	2:06.73

=== Women's events ===
Event	Gold		Silver		Bronze	
Downhill	Alice Merryweather; United States	1:25.27	Katja Grossmann; Switzerland	1:25.29	Kira Weidle; Germany	1:25.70
Super-G	Nadine Fest; Austria	1:15.10	Franziska Gritsch; Austria	1:16.29	Dajana Dengscherz; Austria	1:16.40
Giant Slalom	Laura Pirovano; Italy	1:58.38	Katharina Liensberger; Austria	1:58.51	Chiara Mair; Austria	1:59.53
Slalom	Camille Rast; Switzerland	1:42.81	Ali Nullmeyer; Canada	1:42.90	Chiara Mair; Austria	1:43.22
Combined	Nadine Fest; Austria	2:09.05	Meta Hrovat; Slovenia	2:09.51	Franziska Gritsch; Austria	2:09.52

=== Team event ===
Event	Gold	Silver	Bronze
Team event	Canada; James Crawford; Stephanie Fleckenstein; Ali Nullmeyer; Jeffrey Read	Austria; Fabio Gstrein; Katharina Liensberger; Simon Rueland; Marie-Therese Sporer	Belgium; Sam Maes; Mathilde Nelles; Kim Vanreusel; Tom Verbeke
