= Alice Merryweather =

American alpine skier (born 1996)

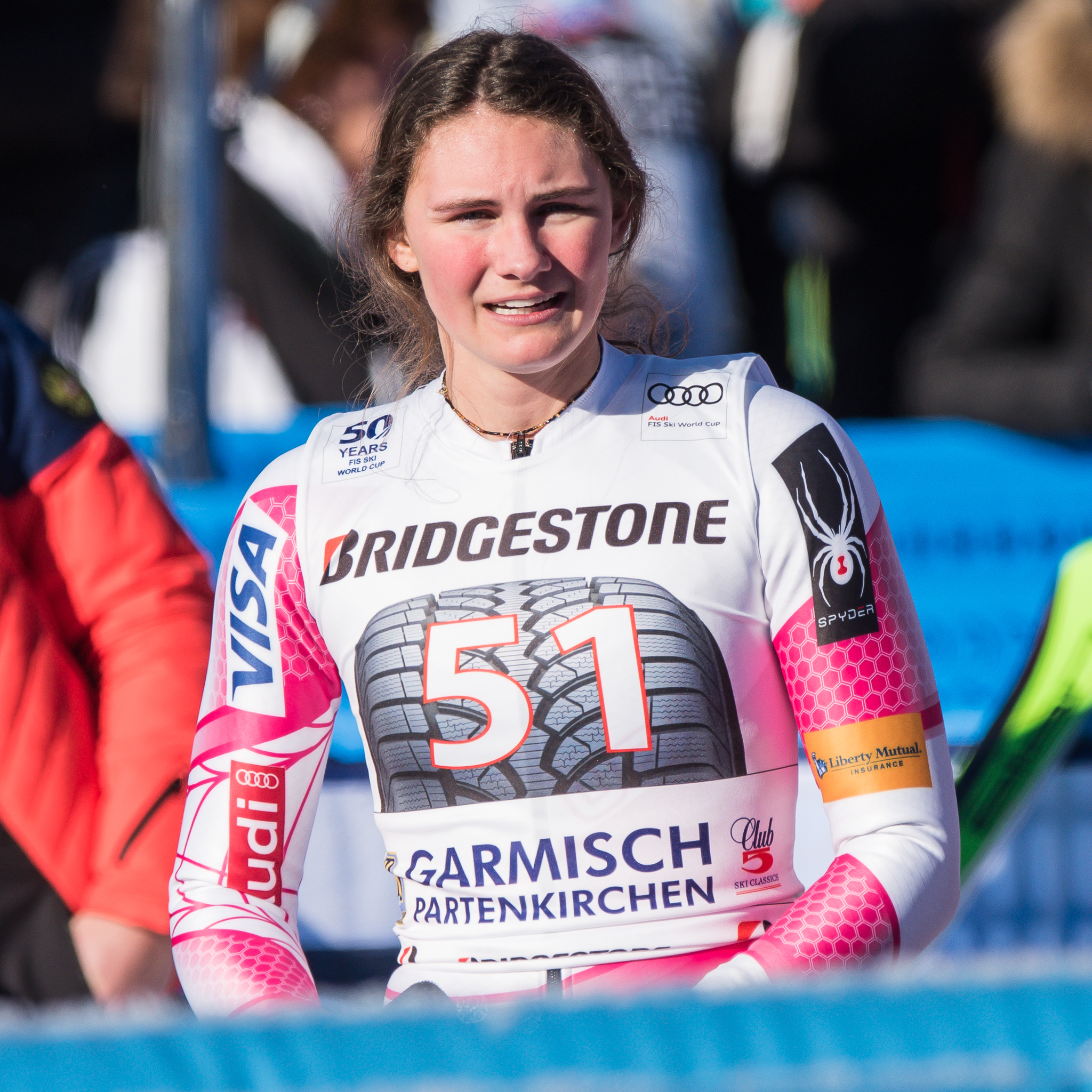
- Merryweather in 2017

Personal information
- Born: October 5, 1996 (age 29) Hingham, Massachusetts, U.S.
- Height: 5 ft 8 in (173 cm)

Skiing career
- Sport: Alpine skiing
- Club: Stratton Mountain School, Attitash Race Team
- Disciplines: Downhill, Super-G
- World Cup debut: January 9, 2016 (age 19)

Olympics
- Teams: 1 – (2018)
- Medals: 0

World Championships
- Teams: 1 – (2019)
- Medals: 0

World Cup
- Seasons: 4 − (2017–2020)
- Podiums: 0
- Overall titles: 0 − (37th in 2020)
- Discipline titles: 0 − (12th in AC, 2020)
Medal record
Women's alpine skiing
Representing United States
World Junior Championships
Gold medal – first place	2017 Åre	Downhill

Alice Merryweather (born October 5, 1996) is a World Cup alpine ski racer from the United States, and competes primarily in the speed events, downhill and super-G. Born and raised in Hingham, Massachusetts, she graduated from Stratton Mountain School in Vermont and plans to attend Dartmouth College in 2018.

Merryweather won the gold medal in the downhill at the World Junior Championships in 2017. She was named to the 2018 U.S. Olympic Team, and was fifteenth in the combined event. She made her first World Cup top ten in January 2019 with an eighth in the downhill at Garmisch-Partenkirchen, Germany.

== World Cup results ==
=== Season standings ===
Season	Age	Overall	Slalom	Giant slalom	Super-G	Downhill	Combined
2017	20	no World Cup points					
2018	21	119	—	—	47	—	—
2019	22	65	—	—	49	27	29
2020	23	37	—	—	26	27	13

=== Top twenty results ===
- 2 top tens
- 11 top twenty finishes

Season	Date	Location	Discipline	Place
2017	March 15, 2017	(United States) Aspen, USA	Downhill	19th
2019	January 27, 2019	Garmisch-Partenkirchen, Germany	Downhill	8th
2019	February 23, 2019	Crans-Montana, Switzerland	Downhill	19th
2020	December 7, 2019	Lake Louise, Canada	Downhill	11th
2020	December 14, 2019	St. Moritz, Switzerland	Super-G	20th
2020	January 26, 2020	Bansko, Bulgaria	Super-G	19th
2020	February 2, 2020	Rosa Khutor, Russia	Super-G	17th
2020	February 8, 2020	Garmisch-Partenkirchen, Germany	Downhill	19th
2020	February 9, 2020	Garmisch-Partenkirchen, Germany	Super-G	14th
2020	February 22, 2020	Crans-Montana, Switzerland	Downhill	20th
2020	February 23, 2020	Crans-Montana, Switzerland	Combined	8th

== World Championship results ==
Year	Age	Slalom	Giant slalom	Super-G	Downhill	Combined
2019	22	—	—	22	22	18

== Olympic results ==
Year	Age	Slalom	Giant slalom	Super-G	Downhill	Combined
2018	21	—	—	—	—	15
