= Lucie Charvátová =

Czech biathlete (born 1993)

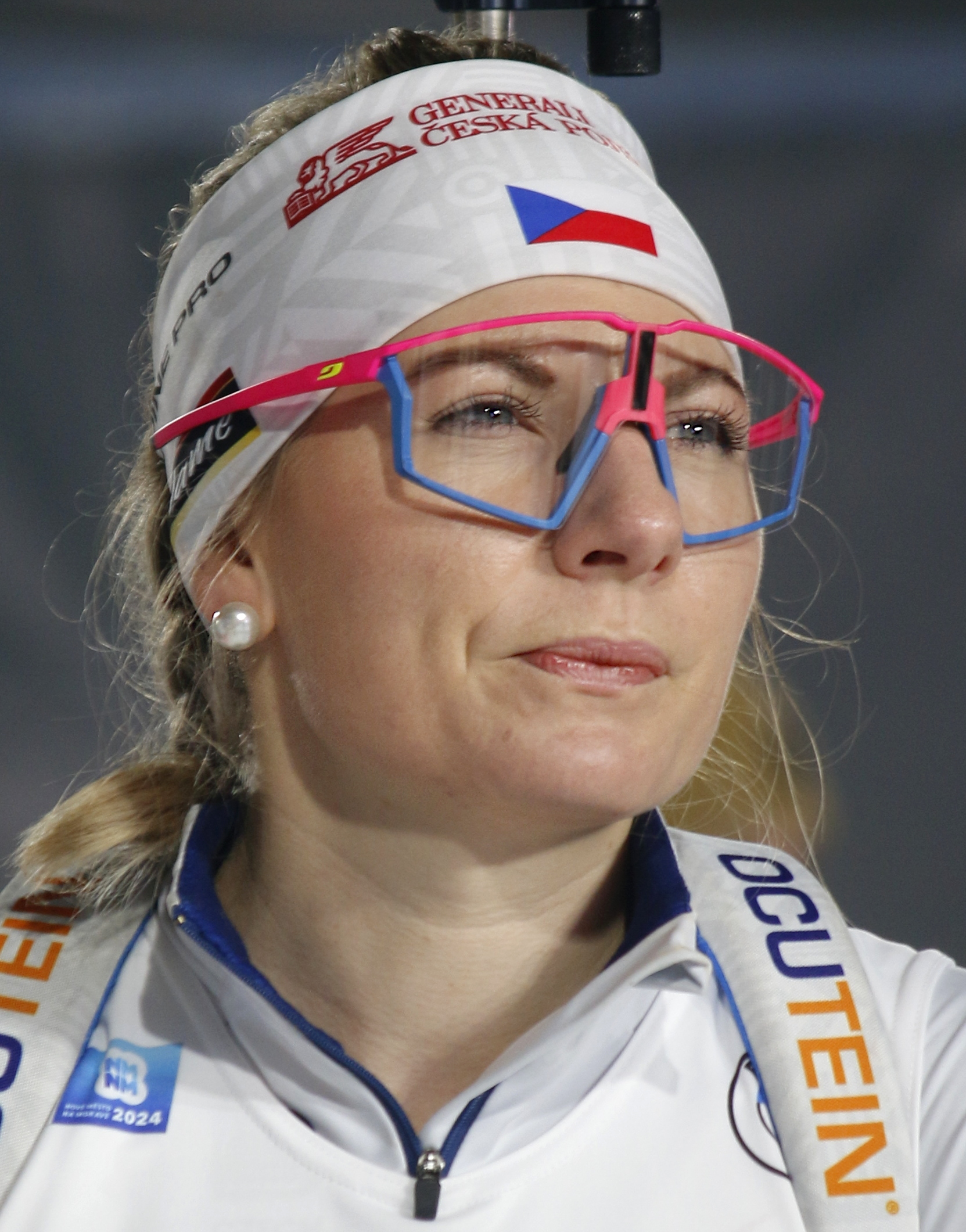
- Lucie Charvátová in 2024

Personal information
- Nationality: Czech
- Born: 1 February 1993 (age 33) Hradec Králové, Czech Republic
- Height: 1.73 m (5 ft 8 in)

Sport

Professional information
- Club: SKP Kornspitz Jablonec
Medal record
Women's biathlon
Representing Czech Republic
World Championships
Bronze medal – third place	2020 Antholz	7.5 km sprint

Lucie Charvátová (Czech pronunciation: [ˈlutsɪjɛ ˈxarvaːtovaː]; born 1 February 1993) is a Czech biathlete. She was born in Hradec Králové. She has competed in the Biathlon World Cup, and represented the Czech Republic at the Biathlon World Championships 2016.

== Biathlon results ==
All results are sourced from the International Biathlon Union.

=== Olympic Games ===
0 medals

Event	Individual	Sprint	Pursuit	Mass start	Relay	Mixed relay
(China) 2022 Beijing	19th	25th	34th	28th	8th	—
(Italy) 2026 Milan-Cortina	31st	46th	50th	—	5th	—

=== World Championships ===
1 medal (1 bronze)

Event	Individual	Sprint	Pursuit	Mass start	Relay	Mixed relay	Single mixed relay
(Norway) 2016 Oslo	45th	33rd	18th	—	6th	—	—
(Austria) 2017 Hochfilzen	82nd	32nd	34th	—	—	—	—
(Sweden) 2019 Östersund	—	71st	—	—	—	—	—
(Italy) 2020 Antholz-Anterselva	46th	Bronze	42nd	29th	4th	—	—
(Slovenia) 2021 Pokljuka	48th	71st	—	—	10th	11th	—
(Germany) 2023 Oberhof	39th	59th	41st	—	7th	—	—
(Czech Republic) 2024 Nové Město na Moravě	71st	40th	LAP	—	7th	—	—
(Switzerland) 2025 Lenzerheide	63rd	39th	50th	—	—	—	—

*During Olympic seasons competitions are only held for those events not included in the Olympic program.
**The single mixed relay was added as an event in 2019.

Olympic Games
Preceded by Michal Březina; Alena Mills	Flagbearer for Czech Republic; Milano Cortina 2026 with David Pastrňák	Succeeded by incumbent
