= Ben Berend =

American Nordic combined skier (born 1995)

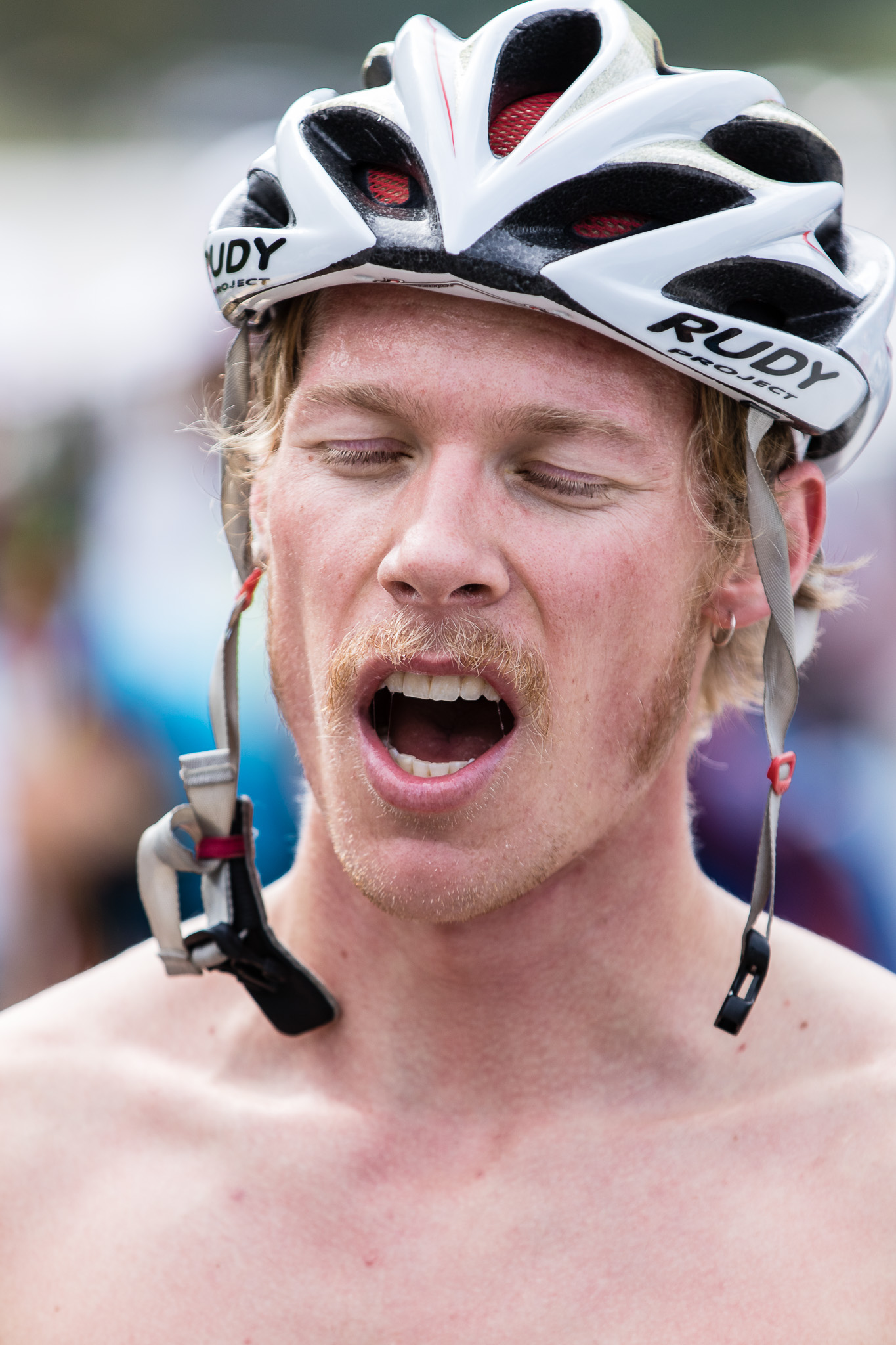
- Ben Berend in 2017.

Personal information
- Nationality: American
- Born: 29 June 1995 (age 30) Steamboat Springs, Colorado
- Height: 5 ft 9 in (175 cm)
- Weight: 145 lb (66 kg)

Sport
- Sport: Nordic combined
- College team: University of New Mexico

Ben Berend (born 29 June 1995) is an American Nordic combined skier. He competed in the 2018 Winter Olympics. He is now a realtor in Steamboat Springs, Colorado.
