= Biathlon World Championships 2020 – Women's sprint =

Women's sprint at the Biathlon World Championships 2020
- Venue: South Tyrol Arena
- Location: Antholz-Anterselva, Italy
- Dates: 14 February
- Competitors: 101 from 33 nations
- Winning time: 21:13.1

Medalists
gold medal	Marte Olsbu Røiseland	Norway
silver medal	Susan Dunklee	United States
bronze medal	Lucie Charvátová	Czech Republic

The Women's sprint competition at the Biathlon World Championships 2020 was held on 14 February 2020.

== Results ==
The race was started at 14:45.

Rank	Bib	Name	Nationality	Time	Penalties (P+S)	Deficit
1st place, gold medalist(s)	16	Marte Olsbu Røiseland	Norway	21:13.1	1 (0+1)	
2nd place, silver medalist(s)	34	Susan Dunklee	United States	21:19.9	0 (0+0)	+6.8
3rd place, bronze medalist(s)	80	Lucie Charvátová	Czech Republic	21:34.4	1 (1+0)	+21.3
4	79	Olena Pidhrushna	Ukraine	21:38.7	1 (1+0)	+25.6
5	40	Denise Herrmann	Germany	21:43.6	3 (2+1)	+30.5
6	20	Lisa Vittozzi	Italy	21:50.7	2 (2+0)	+37.6
7	15	Dorothea Wierer	Italy	21:52.1	2 (1+1)	+39.0
8	29	Franziska Preuß	Germany	21:53.9	2 (1+1)	+40.8
9	10	Ivona Fialková	Slovakia	21:57.3	1 (0+1)	+44.2
10	12	Aita Gasparin	Switzerland	21:57.5	0 (0+0)	+44.4
11	97	Vita Semerenko	Ukraine	21:59.5	0 (0+0)	+46.4
12	44	Baiba Bendika	Latvia	22:00.0	1 (1+0)	+46.9
13	67	Elvira Öberg	Sweden	22:00.5	1 (1+0)	+47.4
14	62	Vanessa Hinz	Germany	22:02.6	2 (1+1)	+49.5
15	82	Célia Aymonier	France	22:03.3	2 (2+0)	+50.2
16	21	Paulína Fialková	Slovakia	22:08.4	2 (0+2)	+55.3
17	52	Lisa Hauser	Austria	22:09.4	1 (0+1)	+56.3
18	55	Hanna Öberg	Sweden	22:10.3	3 (0+3)	+57.2
19	68	Katharina Innerhofer	Austria	22:11.4	2 (0+2)	+58.3
20	58	Anaïs Bescond	France	22:13.5	2 (1+1)	+1:00.4
21	19	Ekaterina Yurlova-Percht	Russia	22:16.7	3 (1+2)	+1:03.6
22	5	Yuliia Dzhima	Ukraine	22:18.5	2 (2+0)	+1:05.4
23	78	Karolin Horchler	Germany	22:24.3	1 (1+0)	+1:11.2
24	9	Eva Puskarčíková	Czech Republic	22:24.6	2 (1+1)	+1:11.5
25	46	Selina Gasparin	Switzerland	22:25.6	3 (1+2)	+1:12.5
26	17	Clare Egan	United States	22:25.7	2 (0+2)	+1:12.6
27	53	Milena Todorova	Bulgaria	22:30.4	1 (0+1)	+1:17.3
28	1	Monika Hojnisz	Poland	22:32.9	2 (0+2)	+1:19.8
29	28	Lea Einfalt	Slovenia	22:33.8	1 (1+0)	+1:20.7
30	45	Regina Oja	Estonia	22:34.9	1 (1+0)	+1:21.8
31	4	Johanna Talihärm	Estonia	22:35.1	1 (0+1)	+1:22.0
32	48	Justine Braisaz	France	22:35.2	4 (2+2)	+1:22.1
33	23	Mona Brorsson	Sweden	22:36.3	2 (1+1)	+1:23.2
34	64	Natalija Kočergina	Lithuania	22:39.7	2 (0+2)	+1:26.6
35	51	Emma Lunder	Canada	22:42.4	3 (2+1)	+1:29.3
36	32	Valentyna Semerenko	Ukraine	22:44.4	2 (0+2)	+1:31.3
37	27	Markéta Davidová	Czech Republic	22:45.2	3 (1+2)	+1:32.1
38	43	Svetlana Mironova	Russia	22:47.2	2 (1+1)	+1:34.1
39	87	Meng Fanqi	China	22:47.8	0 (0+0)	+1:34.7
40	60	Kaisa Mäkäräinen	Finland	22:48.0	4 (2+2)	+1:34.9
41	37	Julia Simon	France	22:48.8	4 (3+1)	+1:35.7
42	73	Yelizaveta Belchenko	Kazakhstan	22:51.9	1 (1+0)	+1:38.8
43	69	Nadia Moser	Canada	22:52.5	2 (2+0)	+1:39.4
44	42	Linn Persson	Sweden	22:53.6	3 (0+3)	+1:40.5
45	22	Federica Sanfilippo	Italy	22:56.7	3 (1+2)	+1:43.6
46	98	Nika Vindišar	Slovenia	22:59.7	2 (0+2)	+1:46.6
47	74	Kinga Zbylut	Poland	23:00.9	2 (0+2)	+1:47.8
48	70	Larisa Kuklina	Russia	23:02.7	4 (1+3)	+1:49.6
49	38	Elena Kruchinkina	Belarus	23:03.2	3 (2+1)	+1:50.1
50	72	Elisa Gasparin	Switzerland	23:04.0	3 (0+3)	+1:50.9
51	88	Christina Rieder	Austria	23:09.0	2 (1+1)	+1:55.9
52	7	Iryna Kryuko	Belarus	23:09.5	2 (1+1)	+1:56.4
53	91	Irina Starykh	Russia	23:10.2	4 (2+2)	+1:57.1
54	101	Magdalena Gwizdoń	Poland	23:10.8	1 (1+0)	+1:57.7
55	61	Sari Maeda	Japan	23:11.6	1 (1+0)	+1:58.5
56	90	Emily Dickson	Canada	23:13.9	2 (1+1)	+2:00.8
57	18	Ingrid Landmark Tandrevold	Norway	23:14.2	4 (0+4)	+2:01.1
58	25	Kamila Żuk	Poland	23:19.7	4 (4+0)	+2:06.6
59	11	Tiril Eckhoff	Norway	23:21.1	6 (2+4)	+2:08.0
60	47	Lotte Lie	Belgium	23:22.0	1 (0+1)	+2:08.9
61	13	Megan Bankes	Canada	23:24.6	2 (0+2)	+2:11.5
62	76	Joanne Reid	United States	23:26.3	2 (1+1)	+2:13.2
63	8	Lena Häcki	Switzerland	23:28.1	5 (3+2)	+2:15.0
64	6	Dunja Zdouc	Austria	23:33.1	3 (1+2)	+2:20.0
65	92	Janina Hettich	Germany	23:36.5	5 (1+4)	+2:23.4
66	54	Galina Vishnevskaya	Kazakhstan	23:38.4	2 (0+2)	+2:25.3
67	30	Michela Carrara	Italy	23:43.8	3 (2+1)	+2:30.7
68	33	Mari Eder	Finland	23:44.5	5 (1+4)	+2:31.4
69	31	Gabrielė Leščinskaitė	Lithuania	23:46.3	2 (1+1)	+2:33.2
70	95	Jessica Jislová	Czech Republic	23:48.6	4 (2+2)	+2:35.5
71	14	Tang Jialin	China	24:00.6	2 (1+1)	+2:47.5
72	89	Dzinara Alimbekava	Belarus	24:02.9	3 (2+1)	+2:49.8
73	96	Emily Dreissigacker	United States	24:05.9	2 (1+1)	+2:52.8
74	99	Anastassiya Kondratyeva	Kazakhstan	24:10.1	2 (0+2)	+2:57.0
75	41	Karoline Offigstad Knotten	Norway	24:14.4	3 (2+1)	+3:01.3
75	66	Tuuli Tomingas	Estonia	24:14.4	4 (2+2)	+3:01.3
77	3	Fuyuko Tachizaki	Japan	24:15.1	3 (1+2)	+3:02.0
78	71	Nina Zadravec	Slovenia	24:20.7	3 (1+2)	+3:07.6
79	86	Yurie Tanaka	Japan	24:38.7	4 (2+2)	+3:25.6
80	2	Suvi Minkkinen	Finland	24:53.4	3 (1+2)	+3:40.3
81	94	Daniela Kadeva	Bulgaria	24:53.6	3 (1+2)	+3:40.5
82	85	Terézia Poliaková	Slovakia	24:55.8	2 (1+1)	+3:42.7
83	36	Anna Frolina	South Korea	24:58.2	6 (4+2)	+3:45.1
84	65	Hanna Sola	Belarus	25:12.1	7 (3+4)	+3:59.0
85	63	Maria Zdravkova	Bulgaria	25:13.7	3 (3+0)	+4:00.6
86	49	Alla Ghilenko	Moldova	25:33.3	4 (3+1)	+4:20.2
87	50	Chu Yuanmeng	China	25:34.6	6 (4+2)	+4:21.5
88	75	Jūlija Matvijenko	Latvia	25:39.0	2 (1+1)	+4:25.9
89	84	Ko Eun-jung	South Korea	25:49.9	2 (2+0)	+4:36.8
90	35	Amanda Lightfoot	Great Britain	25:51.2	5 (3+2)	+4:38.1
91	39	Enikö Marton	Romania	26:05.0	3 (1+2)	+4:51.9
92	24	Veronika Machyniaková	Slovakia	26:13.4	6 (3+3)	+5:00.3
93	59	Jillian Colebourn	Australia	26:28.1	5 (2+3)	+5:15.0
94	57	Nika Blaženić	Croatia	26:29.2	5 (3+2)	+5:16.1
95	100	Mariya Abe	South Korea	26:36.1	2 (1+1)	+5:23.0
96	83	Ana Larisa Cotrus	Romania	26:36.3	6 (4+2)	+5:23.2
97	102	Ana Jesipionok	Lithuania	26:38.9	1 (1+0)	+5:25.8
98	93	Sanita Buliņa	Latvia	26:56.2	3 (3+0)	+5:43.1
99	26	Sára Pónya	Hungary	27:39.8	4 (1+3)	+6:26.7
100	77	Anika Kožica	Croatia	27:51.6	5 (2+3)	+6:38.5
101	56	Enkhbayar Ariuntungalag	Mongolia	28:08.3	7 (4+3)	+6:55.2
	81	Rieke De Maeyer	Belgium	Did not start		
