= Susan Dunklee =

American biathlete (born 1986)

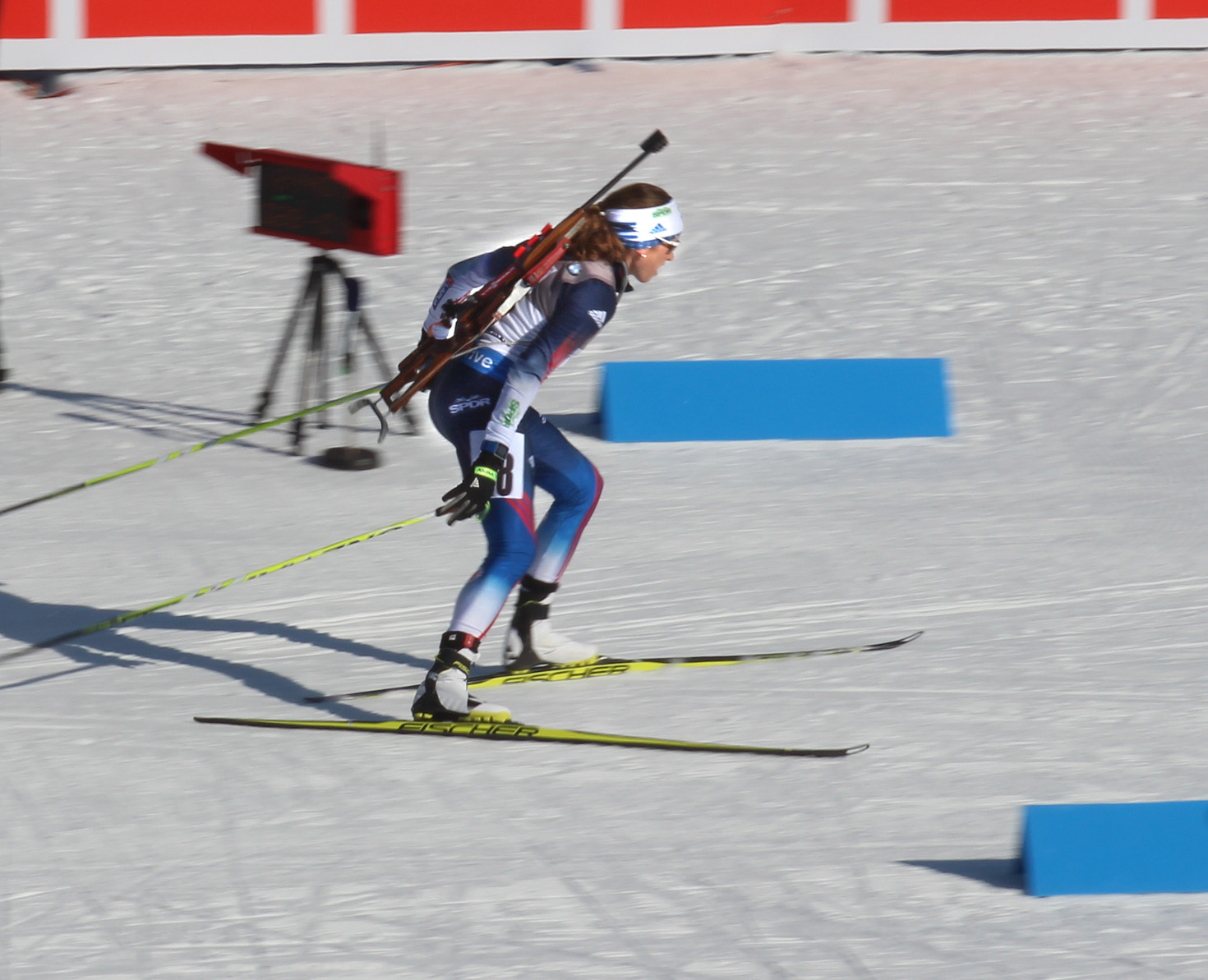
- Dunklee in 2015

Personal information
- Born: February 13, 1986 (age 40) Newport, Vermont, United States
- Height: 5 ft 7 in (170 cm)
- Website: susandunklee.com

Sport

Professional information
- Sport: Biathlon
- Club: Craftsbury Green Racing Project
- World Cup debut: December 1, 2011

Olympic Games
- Teams: 3 (2014, 2018, 2022)
- Medals: 0 (0 gold)

World Championships
- Teams: 7 (2012–2020)
- Medals: 2 (0 gold)

World Cup
- Seasons: 11 (2011/12–2021/22)
- Individual victories: 0
- All victories: 0
- Individual podiums: 6
- All podiums: 7
Medal record
World Championships
Silver medal – second place	2017 Hochfilzen	12.5 km mass start
Silver medal – second place	2020 Antholz	7.5 km sprint

Susan Dunklee (born February 13, 1986, in Newport, Vermont) is a retired American biathlete.

== Life and career ==
Dunklee was raised in the town of Barton, Vermont and started skiing at the age of two, first entering cross-country competitions at the age of seven. She attended St. Johnsbury Academy, in St. Johnsbury, Vermont for high school. She took up biathlon while she was a senior at Dartmouth College, where she studied ecology. While at Dartmouth, Dunklee was also a member of Dartmouth's 2007 National Championship Ski team and was active in the Dartmouth Outing Club. Prior to this she had been a double All-American in cross-country skiing. Her best World Cup finish was 2nd in a Sprint event in Presque Isle, ME in 2016.

At the 2012 Biathlon World Championships in Ruhpolding, Dunklee set a new World Championship best with a fifth place in the individual event.

On November 22, 2013, Dunklee was named to the American team for the 2014 Winter Olympics.

Susan's father, Stan Dunklee, was a former NCAA cross-country skiing champion and competed at the 1976 and 1980 Winter Olympics, while her uncle Everett Dunklee competed in cross-country skiing at the 1972 Winter Olympics.

On February 19, 2017, Dunklee finished 2nd in the Mass Start at Hochfilzen in the 2017 Biathlon World Championships, winning her first World Championship medal. This made her the first American woman to win an individual medal at an Olympics or World Championships in biathlon. It also made her the first woman and second person overall, after Lowell Bailey, to qualify for the next U.S. Olympic team.

She qualified to represent the United States at the 2022 Winter Olympics.

Dunklee retired at the end of the 2021–22 season.

== Biathlon results ==
All results are sourced from the International Biathlon Union.

=== Olympic Games ===
Event	Individual	Sprint	Pursuit	Mass start	Relay	Mixed relay
(Russia) 2014 Sochi	34th	14th	18th	11th	7th	8th
(South Korea) 2018 Pyeongchang	19th	66th	–	–	13th	15th
(China) 2022 Beijing	63rd	27th	40th	–	11th	7th

=== World Championships ===
Event	Individual	Sprint	Pursuit	Mass start	Relay	Mixed relay	Single mixed relay
(Germany) 2012 Ruhpolding	5th	55th	36th	16th	11th	12th	
(Czech Republic) 2013 Nové Město	15th	49th	47th	—	11th	8th	
(Finland) 2015 Kontiolahti	12th	42nd	34th	20th	12th	8th	
(Norway) 2016 Oslo Holmenkollen	18th	8th	10th	11th	13th	10th	
(Austria) 2017 Hochfilzen	6th	29nd	22nd	Silver	14th	16th	
(Sweden) 2019 Östersund	30th	57th	24th	–	9th	19th	13th
(Italy) 2020 Antholz-Anterselva	55th	Silver	36th	27th	15th	13th	11th
(Slovenia) 2021 Pokljuka	77th	18th	27th	25th	13th		

*During Olympic seasons, competitions are only held for those events not included in the Olympic program.

=== Individual podiums ===
No.	Season	Date	Location	Race	Level	Placement
1	2013–14	20 March 2014	(Norway) Oslo Holmenkollen	7.5 km Sprint	World Cup	3rd
2	2015–16	11 February 2016	(United States) Presque Isle	7.5 km Sprint	World Cup	2nd
3	2016–17	16 December 2016	(Czech Republic) Nové Město	7.5 km Sprint	World Cup	3rd
4	2016–17	19 February 2017	(Austria) Hochfilzen	12.5 km Mass start	World Championships	2nd
5	2018–19	18 March 2018	(Norway) Oslo Holmenkollen	10 km Pursuit	World Cup	3rd
6	2019–20	14 February 2020	(Italy) Antholz-Anterselva	7.5 km Sprint	World Championships	2nd
