= 2013–14 Biathlon World Cup – Overall Women =

== 2012–13 Top 3 Standings ==
| Medal | Athlete | Points |
|---|---|---|
| Gold: | (Norway) Tora Berger | 1234 |
| Silver: | (Belarus) Darya Domracheva | 924 |
| Bronze: | (Germany) Andrea Henkel | 856 |

== Events summary ==
| Event: | Winner: | Second: | Third: |
|---|---|---|---|
| Östersund 15 km Individual details | Gabriela Soukalová; Czech Republic | Anastasiya Kuzmina; Slovakia | Marie Laure Brunet; France |
| Östersund 7.5 km Sprint details | Ann Kristin Flatland; Norway | Olga Zaitseva; Russia | Tora Berger; Norway |
| Hochfilzen 7.5 km Sprint details | Selina Gasparin; Switzerland | Veronika Vítková; Czech Republic | Irina Starykh; Russia |
| Hochfilzen 10 km Pursuit details | Synnøve Solemdal; Norway | Juliya Dzhyma; Ukraine | Krystyna Pałka; Poland |
| Annecy 7.5 km Sprint details | Selina Gasparin; Switzerland | Kaisa Mäkäräinen; Finland | Valj Semerenko; Ukraine |
| Annecy 10 km Pursuit details | Valj Semerenko; Ukraine | Irina Starykh; Russia | Tiril Eckhoff; Norway |
| Oberhof 7.5 km Sprint details | Darya Domracheva; Belarus | Kaisa Mäkäräinen; Finland | Olena Pidhrushna; Ukraine |
| Oberhof 10 km Pursuit details | Darya Domracheva; Belarus | Kaisa Mäkäräinen; Finland | Synnøve Solemdal; Norway |
| Oberhof 12.5 km Mass start details | Tora Berger; Norway | Synnøve Solemdal; Norway | Darya Domracheva; Belarus |
| Ruhpolding 15 km Individual details | Gabriela Soukalová; Czech Republic | Darya Domracheva; Belarus | Veronika Vítková; Czech Republic |
| Ruhpolding 10 km Pursuit details | Gabriela Soukalová; Czech Republic | Tora Berger; Norway | Kaisa Mäkäräinen; Finland |
| Antholz 7.5 km Sprint details | Anaïs Bescond; France | Andrea Henkel; Germany | Darya Domracheva; Belarus |
| Antholz 10 km Pursuit details | Andrea Henkel; Germany | Nadezhda Skardino; Belarus | Tora Berger; Norway |
| Pokljuka 7.5 km Sprint details | Katharina Innerhofer; Austria | Daria Virolaynen; Russia | Nadezhda Skardino; Belarus |
| Pokljuka 10 km Pursuit details | Kaisa Mäkäräinen; Finland | Tora Berger; Norway | Dorothea Wierer; Italy |
| Pokljuka 12.5 km Mass start details | Darya Domracheva; Belarus | Kaisa Mäkäräinen; Finland | Olga Zaitseva; Russia |
| Kontiolahti 7.5 km Sprint details | Kaisa Mäkäräinen; Finland | Olga Zaitseva; Russia | Mari Laukkanen; Finland |
| Kontiolahti 7.5 km Sprint details | Kaisa Mäkäräinen; Finland | Tora Berger; Norway | Gabriela Soukalová; Czech Republic |
| Kontiolahti 10 km Pursuit details | Kaisa Mäkäräinen; Finland | Darya Domracheva; Belarus | Olga Zaitseva; Russia |
| Holmenkollen 7.5 km Sprint details | Darya Domracheva; Belarus | Tora Berger; Norway | Susan Dunklee; United States |
| Holmenkollen 10 km Pursuit details | Anastasiya Kuzmina; Slovakia | Tora Berger; Norway | Olga Vilukhina; Russia |
| Holmenkollen 12.5 km Mass start details | Anastasiya Kuzmina; Slovakia | Teja Gregorin; Slovenia | Marie Dorin Habert; France |

== Standings ==
| # | Name | ÖST IN | ÖST SP | HOC SP | HOC PU | ANN SP | ANN PU | OBE SP | OBE PU | OBE MS | RUH IN | RUH PU | ANT SP | ANT PU | POK SP | POK PU | POK MS | KON SP | KON SP | KON PU | HOL SP | HOL PU | HOL MS | Total |
|---|---|---|---|---|---|---|---|---|---|---|---|---|---|---|---|---|---|---|---|---|---|---|---|---|
| 1. | Kaisa Mäkäräinen (FIN) | ~~0~~ | 21 | 25 | 27 | 54 | 26 | 54 | 54 | 40 | 31 | 48 | 32 | 32 | 43 | 60 | 54 | 60 | 60 | 60 | ~~18~~ | 43 | 36 | 860 |
| 2 | Tora Berger (NOR) | 18 | 48 | 43 | 23 | ~~0~~ | ~~3~~ | 43 | 43 | 60 | 40 | 54 | 38 | 48 | 38 | 54 | 34 | 43 | 54 | 40 | 54 | 54 | 27 | 856 |
| 3 | Darya Domracheva (BLR) | 38 | 43 | 5 | 30 | — | — | 60 | 60 | 48 | 54 | 29 | 48 | 40 | 13 | 43 | 60 | 4 | 21 | 54 | 60 | 40 | 43 | 793 |
| 4 | Gabriela Soukalová (CZE) | 60 | 38 | 18 | 32 | 43 | 43 | 15 | 29 | 28 | 60 | 60 | DSQ | — | — | — | — | 36 | 48 | 12 | 40 | 27 | 24 | 613 |
| 5 | Olga Vilukhina (RUS) | — | — | 8 | 21 | 40 | 32 | 26 | 40 | 32 | 23 | 23 | 31 | 25 | 27 | 34 | 38 | 40 | 31 | 18 | 43 | 48 | 32 | 612 |
| 6 | Anastasiya Kuzmina (SVK) | 54 | 6 | 28 | 25 | 25 | 24 | — | — | 36 | 30 | 14 | 25 | 34 | 14 | 16 | 43 | — | 43 | 31 | 38 | 60 | 60 | 606 |
| 7 | Tiril Eckhoff (NOR) | 40 | 5 | ~~0~~ | 17 | 30 | 48 | 31 | 27 | 29 | 16 | 36 | 27 | 43 | 36 | 40 | 40 | 29 | 29 | 25 | 0 | — | 18 | 566 |
| 8 | Valj Semerenko (UKR) | 25 | 20 | 19 | 36 | 48 | 60 | 38 | 32 | 26 | 34 | 34 | — | — | 0 | 30 | 27 | 19 | 19 | 22 | 23 | 19 | 22 | 553 |
| 9 | Veronika Vítková (CZE) | ~~0~~ | 30 | 54 | 43 | 24 | 12 | 28 | 30 | 17 | 48 | 40 | 7 | 14 | ~~0~~ | 24 | 30 | 38 | 30 | 38 | 0 | 15 | 29 | 551 |
| 10 | Andrea Henkel (GER) | 31 | 28 | ~~0~~ | 12 | 28 | 9 | ~~4~~ | 25 | 43 | 24 | 27 | 54 | 60 | 16 | 38 | 29 | 11 | 32 | 7 | 10 | 29 | 28 | 541 |
| 11 | Selina Gasparin (SUI) | 11 | 22 | 60 | 26 | 60 | 38 | 7 | 1 | 24 | 22 | 24 | 22 | 11 | 8 | 31 | 25 | ~~0~~ | 40 | 19 | 14 | ~~0~~ | 30 | 495 |
| 12 | Olga Zaitseva (RUS) | 24 | 54 | 34 | 31 | 10 | 36 | — | — | — | 0 | 0 | — | — | 9 | 0 | 48 | 54 | 38 | 48 | 3 | 26 | 40 | 455 |
| 13 | Teja Gregorin (SLO) | 23 | 0 | 22 | 28 | 18 | 17 | — | — | — | 18 | 26 | 29 | 38 | 20 | 17 | 18 | 15 | 27 | 43 | 6 | 18 | 54 | 437 |
| 14 | Franziska Hildebrand (GER) | 28 | 18 | 10 | 6 | 38 | 25 | 23 | 20 | 31 | 43 | 28 | 2 | 24 | 0 | ~~0~~ | 26 | 34 | 15 | 13 | ~~0~~ | 11 | 16 | 411 |
| 15 | Laura Dahlmeier (GER) | 27 | 10 | 26 | 16 | 31 | 40 | — | — | 22 | 27 | 22 | 20 | 36 | 19 | 0 | 13 | — | — | — | 31 | 30 | 38 | 408 |
| 16 | Dorothea Wierer (ITA) | 34 | ~~0~~ | 3 | 19 | 9 | 14 | 32 | 19 | 18 | 26 | 20 | 15 | 21 | 40 | 48 | 24 | 8 | 36 | 0 | 0 | — | 13 | 399 |
| 17 | Nadezhda Skardino (BLR) | 36 | 15 | 13 | — | 0 | — | — | — | — | 36 | 32 | 34 | 54 | 48 | 18 | 36 | 23 | 28 | 24 | 0 | — | — | 397 |
| 18 | Juliya Dzhyma (UKR) | 0 | 27 | 40 | 54 | 26 | 27 | 0 | — | 34 | 38 | 38 | — | — | 10 | 11 | 32 | 6 | 18 | 1 | 0 | — | 17 | 379 |
| 19 | Franziska Preuß (GER) | 0 | 14 | 21 | 29 | 38 | 30 | 0 | 10 | 20 | 25 | 43 | 36 | 20 | 0 | — | 20 | — | — | — | 30 | 16 | 25 | 377 |
| 20 | Ann Kristin Flatland (NOR) | 19 | 60 | 0 | 8 | — | — | 40 | 38 | 16 | 29 | — | 28 | 29 | — | — | — | — | — | — | 36 | 32 | 26 | 361 |
| 21 | Anaïs Bescond (FRA) | 0 | 31 | 27 | 11 | 20 | 34 | 0 | — | 11 | 12 | 30 | 60 | 30 | — | — | 21 | 7 | 26 | 9 | 0 | — | 31 | 360 |
| 22 | Irina Starykh (RUS) | 14 | 40 | 48 | 40 | 29 | 54 | 21 | 22 | 14 | 9 | 25 | 24 | 19 | — | — | — | — | — | — | — | — | — | 359 |
| 23 | Krystyna Pałka (POL) | 15 | 7 | 30 | 48 | 32 | 23 | 18 | 24 | 38 | 0 | 15 | 8 | 8 | 5 | — | 19 | — | 0 | 0 | 15 | 13 | 19 | 337 |
| 24 | Susan Dunklee (USA) | 0 | 25 | 0 | — | 0 | 0 | 9 | 16 | — | 0 | 8 | 43 | 17 | 3 | 21 | — | 12 | 34 | 36 | 48 | 38 | 23 | 333 |
| 25 | Yana Romanova (RUS) | 0 | 8 | — | — | 13 | 28 | 30 | 26 | 23 | 4 | 13 | 40 | — | 28 | 22 | 23 | 5 | 8 | 28 | 0 | — | 14 | 313 |
| 26 | Rosanna Crawford (CAN) | 0 | 0 | 24 | 15 | 15 | 22 | — | — | — | 15 | 4 | 0 | — | 24 | 27 | 11 | 28 | 25 | 14 | 30 | 24 | 34 | 312 |
| 27 | Weronika Nowakowska-Ziemniak (POL) | 0 | 0 | 32 | 24 | — | — | 34 | 31 | 12 | 21 | 17 | 5 | 26 | 0 | — | 28 | 24 | 17 | 20 | 0 | 0 | 15 | 306 |
| 28 | Fanny Welle-Strand Horn (NOR) | — | — | 12 | 0 | 19 | 21 | 0 | 15 | — | 1 | 18 | 30 | 13 | 7 | 15 | 22 | 22 | 9 | 16 | 32 | 31 | 21 | 304 |
| 29 | Olena Pidhrushna (UKR) | 30 | 29 | 31 | 20 | 34 | 31 | 48 | 34 | 27 | — | — | — | — | — | — | — | — | — | — | — | — | — | 284 |
| 30 | Synnøve Solemdal (NOR) | 13 | 34 | 38 | 60 | — | — | 20 | 48 | 54 | — | — | 12 | — | — | — | — | — | — | — | — | — | — | 279 |
| # | Name | ÖST IN | ÖST SP | HOC SP | HOC PU | ANN SP | ANN PU | OBE SP | OBE PU | OBE MS | RUH IN | RUH PU | ANT SP | ANT PU | POK SP | POK PU | POK MS | KON SP | KON SP | KON PU | HOL SP | HOL PU | HOL MS | Total |
| 31 | Jana Gereková (SVK) | 3 | 32 | 20 | 10 | 12 | 5 | — | — | — | 0 | 7 | 26 | 27 | 0 | 14 | 12 | 30 | 10 | 26 | 5 | 28 | — | 267 |
| 32 | Vita Semerenko (UKR) | — | — | 17 | 34 | 27 | 29 | 24 | 0 | — | 7 | — | — | — | 29 | 6 | — | 0 | 20 | 21 | 7 | 34 | — | 255 |
| 33 | Marie Laure Brunet (FRA) | 48 | 26 | 36 | 22 | 0 | 0 | — | — | — | 20 | 31 | 20 | 28 | — | — | — | — | — | — | — | — | — | 231 |
| 34 | Magdalena Gwizdoń (POL) | 9 | 0 | 0 | 0 | 0 | 19 | 25 | 0 | — | 0 | 0 | 0 | 9 | 30 | 20 | 16 | 32 | 5 | 29 | 28 | 8 | — | 230 |
| 35 | Marie Dorin Habert (FRA) | — | — | — | — | — | — | — | — | — | — | — | — | — | 23 | 25 | — | 20 | 24 | 32 | 8 | 36 | 48 | 216 |
| 36 | Katharina Innerhofer (AUT) | 8 | 0 | 0 | 0 | 0 | — | 8 | 5 | — | 19 | 11 | 0 | — | 60 | 36 | 17 | 27 | 0 | 0 | 13 | 6 | — | 210 |
| 37 | Ekaterina Shumilova (RUS) | 10 | 24 | 29 | 38 | — | — | 3 | 9 | 15 | 0 | 10 | 3 | 22 | 25 | 9 | — | 0 | 0 | — | — | — | — | 197 |
| 38 | Elise Ringen (NOR) | 0 | 23 | 23 | 18 | — | — | 19 | 28 | 25 | 13 | 21 | 0 | — | — | 15 | — | — | — | — | — | — | — | 185 |
| 39 | Natalya Burdyga (UKR) | 0 | 11 | 0 | 0 | 22 | 7 | 14 | 17 | 30 | 6 | 6 | 17 | — | 0 | 26 | 14 | 0 | 0 | — | 11 | 1 | — | 182 |
| 40 | Karin Oberhofer (ITA) | 32 | 0 | 0 | — | 17 | 18 | 0 | 0 | — | 0 | 3 | — | — | 0 | — | — | 14 | 23 | 27 | 22 | 21 | — | 177 |
| 41 | Liudmila Kalinchik (BLR) | 0 | 0 | 0 | — | 0 | 0 | 16 | 8 | — | — | — | 13 | 18 | 34 | 29 | 31 | — | 4 | 10 | 0 | 3 | — | 166 |
| 42 | Mari Laukkanen (FIN) | 0 | 0 | 0 | — | 4 | 0 | 5 | 13 | — | — | — | 23 | 4 | 32 | 0 | — | 48 | 14 | 2 | 12 | 0 | — | 157 |
| 43 | Zina Kocher (CAN) | 0 | 0 | 16 | 0 | 0 | 0 | — | — | — | — | — | 0 | — | 18 | 28 | — | 18 | 0 | — | 25 | 25 | 20 | 150 |
| 44 | Monika Hojnisz (POL) | 29 | 3 | 0 | 13 | — | — | 0 | 23 | — | 0 | 0 | 21 | 23 | 4 | 7 | — | 25 | 0 | 0 | 0 | 0 | — | 148 |
| 45 | Andreja Mali (SLO) | 12 | 0 | 15 | 0 | 21 | 0 | 0 | — | — | 0 | 1 | 16 | 12 | 0 | — | — | 0 | 12 | 0 | 34 | 9 | 11 | 143 |
| 46 | Evi Sachenbacher-Stehle (GER) | 16 | 16 | 0 | — | 3 | 10 | 36 | 36 | 19 | 0 | — | 0 | — | — | — | — | — | — | — | — | — | — | 136 |
| 47 | Anna-Karin Strömstedt (SWE) | — | 0 | — | — | 0 | 0 | 10 | 14 | — | 0 | — | 18 | 0 | 2 | 0 | — | 0 | 22 | 0 | 28 | 24 | 12 | 130 |
| 48 | Daria Virolaynen (RUS) | — | — | — | — | — | — | — | — | — | — | — | — | — | 54 | 32 | 15 | 1 | 6 | 3 | 3 | 5 | — | 119 |
| 49 | Anaïs Chevalier (FRA) | — | — | 14 | 2 | 0 | 0 | 27 | 7 | — | 3 | 0 | 6 | 15 | 0 | 0 | — | 0 | 11 | 34 | 0 | 0 | — | 119 |
| 50 | Marine Bolliet (FRA) | 0 | 0 | 7 | 1 | 0 | 1 | 29 | 21 | 13 | 0 | — | 1 | 5 | 17 | 19 | — | 0 | 3 | 0 | 0 | 0 | — | 117 |
| 51 | Nicole Gontier (ITA) | 6 | 0 | 0 | — | 0 | 0 | — | — | — | 0 | — | — | — | 26 | 23 | — | 0 | 16 | 11 | 16 | 14 | — | 112 |
| 52 | Marte Olsbu (NOR) | — | — | — | — | 0 | 20 | — | — | — | 0 | 0 | — | — | 31 | 13 | — | 16 | 0 | 30 | 0 | — | — | 110 |
| 53 | Éva Tófalvi (ROM) | 0 | 1 | 0 | — | 0 | — | 0 | — | — | 0 | 12 | 0 | 16 | 0 | — | — | 0 | 13 | 23 | 21 | 22 | — | 108 |
| 54 | Elisa Gasparin (SUI) | 0 | 0 | 0 | 9 | 0 | — | 22 | 18 | 21 | 14 | 9 | 0 | — | — | — | — | 0 | 0 | 0 | 0 | 7 | — | 100 |
| 55 | Laure Soulie (AND) | 7 | 4 | 11 | 3 | 0 | 4 | 0 | 0 | — | 32 | 19 | 0 | — | 0 | 0 | — | 0 | 0 | 5 | 0 | 0 | — | 85 |
| 56 | Ekaterina Iourieva (RUS) | 43 | 36 | 0 | 0 | — | — | 2 | 2 | — | — | — | — | — | — | — | — | — | — | — | — | — | — | 83 |
| 57 | Olga Podchufarova (RUS) | — | — | — | — | — | — | — | — | — | — | — | — | — | 0 | 8 | — | 10 | 0 | 15 | 20 | 17 | — | 70 |
| 58 | Sophie Boilley (FRA) | 17 | 17 | 0 | 7 | 6 | 13 | 0 | 0 | — | 0 | 0 | 10 | 0 | — | — | — | — | — | — | 0 | 0 | — | 70 |
| 59 | Fuyuko Suzuki (JPN) | — | — | 1 | 14 | 0 | — | 0 | 4 | — | 28 | 16 | — | — | — | — | — | — | — | — | — | — | — | 63 |
| 60 | Vanessa Hinz (GER) | — | — | — | — | — | — | — | — | — | — | — | 0 | 0 | 0 | 5 | — | 0 | 1 | 17 | 20 | 20 | — | 63 |
| # | Name | ÖST IN | ÖST SP | HOC SP | HOC PU | ANN SP | ANN PU | OBE SP | OBE PU | OBE MS | RUH IN | RUH PU | ANT SP | ANT PU | POK SP | POK PU | POK MS | KON SP | KON SP | KON PU | HOL SP | HOL PU | HOL MS | Total |
| 61 | Nastassia Dubarezava (BLR) | 0 | 0 | 0 | — | 0 | — | 17 | 6 | — | 0 | — | 0 | 6 | 0 | 0 | — | 21 | 0 | 0 | 0 | 12 | — | 62 |
| 62 | Paulína Fialková (SVK) | 0 | 0 | 0 | — | — | — | — | — | — | — | — | 0 | — | — | — | — | 31 | 0 | 0 | 17 | 0 | — | 48 |
| 63 | Mariya Panfilova (UKR) | 0 | 0 | 0 | 0 | 7 | 0 | 0 | 0 | — | 0 | — | 0 | — | 12 | 0 | — | 0 | 0 | 0 | 26 | 0 | — | 45 |
| 64 | Megan Heinicke (CAN) | 0 | 0 | 0 | — | 0 | 8 | — | — | — | 11 | 0 | 0 | — | 0 | 0 | — | 26 | 0 | — | 0 | — | — | 45 |
| 65 | Chaoqing Song (CHN) | — | 0 | — | — | — | — | — | — | — | — | — | 11 | 31 | — | — | — | 0 | — | — | 0 | — | — | 42 |
| 66 | Eva Puskarčíková (CZE) | — | — | 3 | 5 | 16 | 6 | 1 | 11 | — | 0 | — | 0 | — | 0 | — | — | 0 | 0 | — | 0 | — | — | 42 |
| 67 | Michela Ponza (ITA) | 0 | 0 | 0 | 0 | 11 | 15 | — | — | — | — | — | 9 | 1 | 1 | 2 | — | — | — | — | — | — | — | 39 |
| 68 | Elisabeth Högberg (SWE) | 5 | 13 | 0 | — | 0 | — | — | — | — | 0 | — | 0 | 3 | 0 | 10 | — | 0 | 0 | — | 0 | 4 | — | 35 |
| 69 | Réka Ferencz (ROU) | 0 | 0 | 0 | 0 | 23 | 11 | 0 | 0 | — | 0 | — | 0 | — | 0 | — | — | 0 | 0 | — | 0 | — | — | 34 |
| 70 | Irene Cadurisch (SUI) | 0 | 0 | 0 | — | — | — | — | — | — | — | — | — | — | 22 | 12 | — | 0 | 0 | 0 | 0 | — | — | 34 |
| 71 | Diana Rasimovičiūtė (LTU) | 22 | 12 | 0 | — | 0 | — | 0 | — | — | 0 | — | — | — | 0 | — | — | 0 | 0 | — | 0 | — | — | 34 |
| 72 | Lisa Theresa Hauser (AUT) | — | — | — | — | 8 | 0 | — | — | — | 17 | 5 | 4 | 0 | — | — | — | — | — | — | — | — | — | 34 |
| 73 | Darya Usanova (KAZ) | 0 | 0 | 9 | 0 | — | — | — | — | — | — | — | 0 | — | — | — | — | 0 | 0 | — | 24 | 0 | — | 33 |
| 74 | Megan Imrie (CAN) | 0 | 19 | 6 | 0 | 1 | 0 | — | — | — | 0 | 2 | 0 | — | — | — | — | — | — | — | — | — | — | 28 |
| 75 | Bente Landheim (NOR) | — | — | — | — | — | — | — | — | — | — | — | — | — | — | — | — | 0 | 0 | 8 | 9 | 10 | — | 27 |
| 76 | Kadri Lehtla (EST) | 26 | 0 | 0 | 0 | 0 | 0 | 0 | — | — | — | — | 0 | — | 0 | — | — | 0 | 0 | 0 | 0 | — | — | 26 |
| 77 | Jitka Landová (CZE) | — | 0 | 0 | — | — | — | — | — | — | 0 | — | 14 | 0 | 0 | 0 | — | 2 | 2 | 4 | 4 | 0 | — | 26 |
| 78 | Nadzeya Pisareva (BLR) | — | — | — | — | — | — | 13 | 3 | — | 0 | 0 | — | — | — | — | — | 9 | 0 | — | — | — | — | 25 |
| 79 | Nadine Horchler (GER) | — | — | — | — | — | — | 12 | 12 | — | — | — | — | — | — | — | — | 0 | 0 | 0 | 0 | — | — | 24 |
| 80 | Victoria Padial (ESP) | 0 | 0 | 0 | — | 0 | — | 0 | 0 | — | 0 | 0 | 0 | — | 21 | 1 | — | 0 | 0 | — | 0 | — | — | 22 |
| 81 | Barbora Tomešová (CZE) | 21 | — | 0 | — | — | — | — | — | — | — | — | 0 | — | — | — | — | — | — | — | — | — | — | 21 |
| 82 | Hilde Fenne (NOR) | 20 | 0 | — | — | — | — | — | — | — | 0 | — | — | — | — | — | — | — | — | — | — | — | — | 20 |
| 83 | Ekaterina Glazyrina (RUS) | 0 | — | 0 | 4 | 0 | 16 | — | — | — | 0 | — | 0 | — | — | — | — | — | — | — | — | — | — | 20 |
| 84 | Desislava Stoyanova (BUL) | 0 | 0 | 0 | — | 14 | 0 | 6 | 0 | — | — | — | 0 | — | 0 | — | — | 0 | 0 | — | 0 | — | — | 20 |
| 85 | Žanna Juškāne (LAT) | 0 | 0 | 0 | — | 0 | — | — | — | — | 0 | — | 0 | — | 0 | — | — | 17 | 0 | — | 0 | — | — | 17 |
| 86 | Tang Jialin (CHN) | 4 | — | 0 | — | 0 | — | 0 | — | — | 10 | 0 | 0 | 2 | 0 | — | — | 0 | 0 | — | — | — | — | 16 |
| 87 | Galina Vishnevskaya (KAZ) | — | — | 0 | — | 5 | 2 | — | — | — | 8 | 0 | 0 | 0 | — | — | — | — | — | — | — | — | — | 15 |
| 88 | Hannah Dreissigacker (USA) | 0 | 0 | 0 | — | 0 | — | — | — | — | — | — | 0 | — | 0 | — | — | 13 | 0 | 0 | 0 | — | — | 13 |
| 89 | Yan Zhang (CHN) | 0 | 0 | 0 | 0 | 0 | 0 | 0 | 0 | — | 0 | 0 | — | — | 0 | — | — | — | 7 | 6 | 0 | — | — | 13 |
| 90 | Galina Nechkasova (RUS) | — | — | — | — | — | — | — | — | — | — | — | 0 | 10 | — | — | — | — | — | — | 0 | 2 | — | 12 |
| # | Name | ÖST IN | ÖST SP | HOC SP | HOC PU | ANN SP | ANN PU | OBE SP | OBE PU | OBE MS | RUH IN | RUH PU | ANT SP | ANT PU | POK SP | POK PU | POK MS | KON SP | KON SP | KON PU | HOL SP | HOL PU | HOL MS | Total |
| 91 | Emma Lunder (CAN) | — | — | — | — | — | — | — | — | — | — | — | — | — | 11 | 0 | — | — | — | — | — | — | — | 11 |
| 92 | Natalija Kocergina (LTU) | 0 | 0 | 0 | — | 0 | — | 11 | 0 | — | 0 | — | 0 | — | 0 | — | — | 0 | 0 | — | 0 | — | — | 11 |
| 93 | Sara Studebaker (USA) | 0 | 0 | — | — | 0 | — | — | — | — | — | — | 0 | 0 | 6 | 4 | — | 0 | 0 | 0 | 0 | 0 | — | 10 |
| 94 | Ekaterina Yurlova (RUS) | 0 | 9 | — | — | — | — | — | — | — | — | — | — | — | — | — | — | — | — | — | — | — | — | 9 |
| 95 | Paulina Bobak (POL) | — | — | — | — | — | — | — | — | — | — | — | 0 | 7 | — | — | — | — | — | — | — | — | — | 7 |
| 96 | Åsa Lif (SWE) | — | — | 0 | — | — | — | 0 | — | — | 5 | — | — | — | — | — | — | — | — | — | — | — | — | 5 |
| 97 | Luminita Piscoran (ROU) | 0 | 0 | 4 | 0 | 0 | — | 0 | — | — | 0 | — | 0 | — | 0 | — | — | 0 | 0 | — | 0 | — | — | 4 |
| 98 | Aita Gasparin (SUI) | — | — | — | — | 0 | — | — | — | — | 0 | 0 | 0 | — | 0 | 3 | — | — | — | — | — | — | — | 3 |
| 99 | Olga Abramova (UKR) | — | — | — | — | — | — | — | — | — | — | — | 0 | — | 0 | — | — | 3 | 0 | — | 0 | — | — | 3 |
| 100 | Inna Suprun (UKR) | 0 | 2 | — | — | — | — | — | — | — | — | — | 0 | 0 | — | — | — | — | — | — | — | — | — | 2 |
| 101 | Elena Khrustaleva (KAZ) | — | — | — | — | 0 | 0 | — | — | — | 2 | 0 | 0 | — | — | — | — | — | — | — | — | — | — | 2 |
| 102 | Daria Yurlova (EST) | 0 | — | 0 | — | 2 | 0 | — | — | — | — | — | 0 | — | 0 | — | — | — | — | — | — | — | — | 2 |
| 103 | Grete Gaim (EST) | 2 | 0 | — | — | 0 | — | 0 | — | — | 0 | — | 0 | — | — | — | — | 0 | — | — | 0 | — | — | 2 |
| 104 | Mona Brorsson (SWE) | 1 | — | 0 | 0 | 0 | — | 0 | — | — | — | — | 0 | — | — | — | — | — | — | — | 0 | — | — | 1 |
| 105 | Valentina Nazarova (RUS) | — | — | — | — | 0 | — | 0 | — | — | — | — | — | — | — | — | — | — | — | — | 1 | 0 | — | 1 |
