= Andrejs Rastorgujevs =

Latvian biathlete (born 1988)

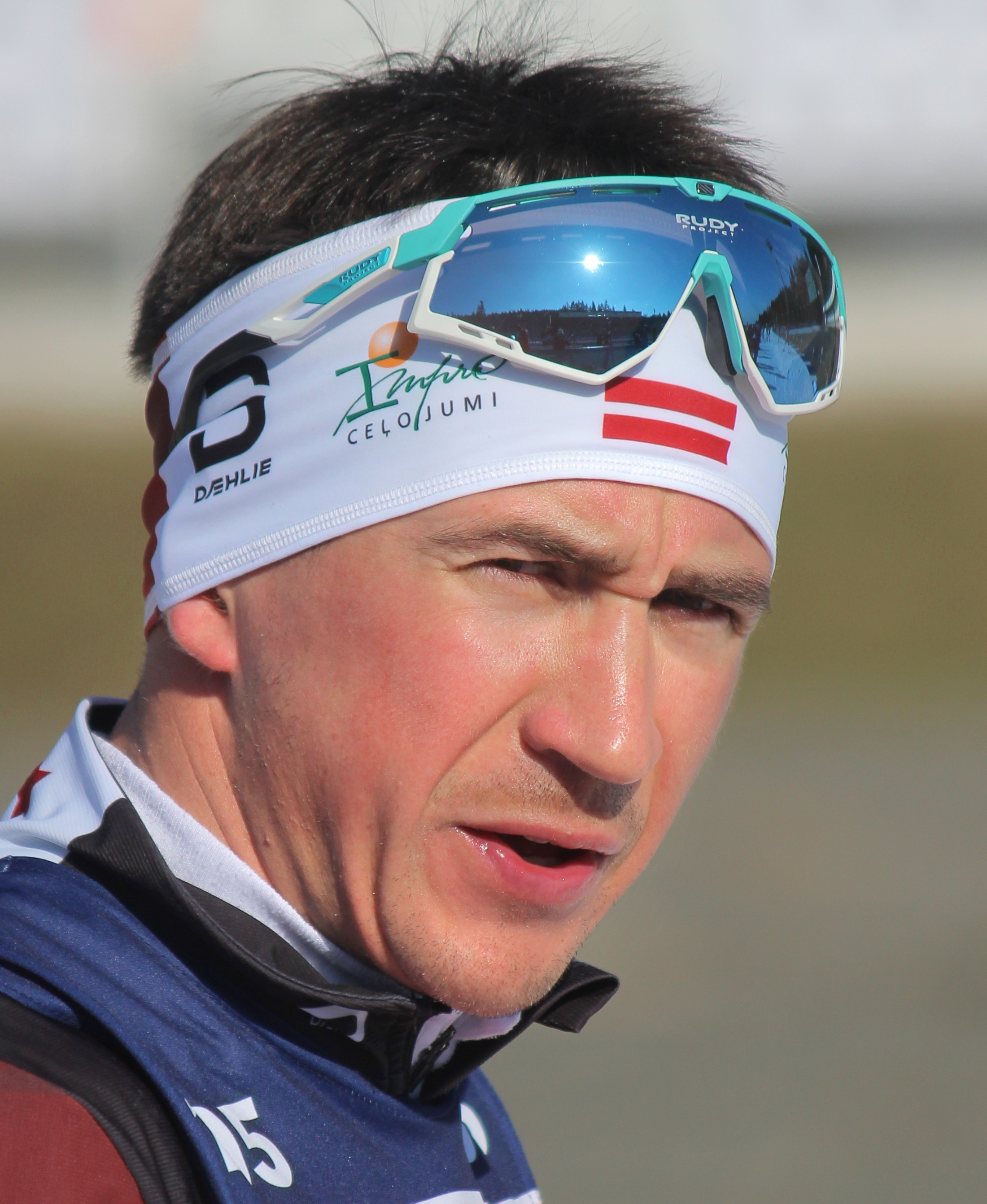
- Rastorgujevs in 2023

Personal information
- Born: 27 May 1988 (age 38) Alūksne, Latvian SSR, Soviet Union
- Height: 1.80 m (5 ft 11 in)

Sport

Professional information
- Sport: Biathlon
- World Cup debut: 5 December 2009

Olympic Games
- Teams: 4 (2010, 2014, 2018, 2026)
- Medals: 0

World Championships
- Teams: 12
- Medals: 1

World Cup
- Seasons: 15 (2009/10–)
- Individual podiums: 3
- All podiums: 4
Medal record
Men's biathlon
Representing Latvia
World Championships
Silver medal – second place	2024 Nové Město	15 km mass start
European Championships
Gold medal – first place	2014 Nové Město	20 km individual
Gold medal – first place	2018 Ridnaun	10 km sprint
Disqualified	2021 Duszniki-Zdrój	20 km individual
Silver medal – second place	2020 Raubichi	10 km sprint
Bronze medal – third place	2014 Nové Město	10 km sprint
Bronze medal – third place	2017 Duszniki-Zdrój	12.5 km pursuit
- Updated on 9 Feb 2026

Andrejs Rastorgujevs (born 27 May 1988) is a Latvian biathlete. He has participated in three Winter Olympics and has two individual and one relay Biathlon World Cup podium.

== Career ==
Andrejs Rastorgujevs is a biathlete from Latvia. In the first event of 2009–10 Biathlon World Cup in Östersund, he participated in 10 km sprint, where he finished 47th, but later on he was disqualified for finishing in the wrong lane. 2012-13 Biathlon World Cup was the breakthrough season for Rastorgujevs, finishing the season 36th overall. Next year, he finished the season 16th overall, while earning four Top 6 finishes.

After finishing fourth four times during his career, he finally won his first podium at the last race of the 2016-17 Biathlon World Cup, finishing second at the 15 km mass start in Oslo.

Rastorgujevs also took part in the 2010 Winter Olympics, where he finished 50th at the sprint and 58th at the pursuit.

Rastorgujevs served an 18 month competition ban from March 2021 to September 2022 for an anti-doping rule violation in relation to whereabouts failures. All of his results were disqualified from 1 July 2020 including his gold medal in the 20 km sprint at the 2021 IBU Open European Championships. Rastorgujevs appealed the decision, but this was rejected in August 2022.

On 5 March 2023, Rastorgujevs and Baiba Bendika placed third in the BMW IBU World Cup placed in Nové Město na Moravě, in the Single Mixed Relays and earned a first-ever Relay podium for Latvia.

On 18 February 2024, Rastorgujevs won a silver medal in the 15-kilometer mass start at the Biathlon World Championships 2024 in Nove Mesto, winning his biggest success in his career and also in the history of Latvian biathlon.

== Career results ==
=== Olympics ===
Event	Individual	Sprint	Pursuit	Mass Start	Relay	Mixed Relay
(Canada) 2010 Vancouver	—	50th	58th	—	19th	—N/a
(Russia) 2014 Sochi	33rd	17th	9th	14th	—	—
(South Korea) 2018 Pyeongchang	59th	24th	12th	28th	—	—
(Italy) 2026 Milano Cortina	41st	30th	29th	—	18th	12th

=== World Championships ===
Event	Individual	Sprint	Pursuit	Mass Start	Relay	Mixed relay	Single mixed relay
(Russia) 2011 Khanty-Mansiysk	43rd	66th	—	—	14th	—	—N/a
(Germany) 2012 Ruhpolding	68th	83rd	—	—	LPD	—	—N/a
(Czech Republic) 2013 Nové Město	50th	65th	—	—	LPD	—	—N/a
(Finland) 2015 Kontiolahti	48th	42nd	25th	—	LPD	—	—N/a
(Norway) 2016 Oslo Holmenkollen	59th	20th	27th	26th	LPD	—	—N/a
(Austria) 2017 Hochfilzen	56th	57th	37th	—	22nd	LPD	—N/a
(Sweden) 2019 Östersund	13th	14th	6th	25th	LPD	—	10th
(Italy) 2020 Rasen-Antholz	22nd	70th	—	—	LPD	—	17th
(Slovenia) 2021 Pokljuka		15th	10th			—	
(Germany) 2023 Oberhof	56th	7th	9th	5th	18th	—	19th
(Czech Republic) 2024 Nové Město	4th	12th	19th	Silver	16th	—	8th
(Switzerland) 2025 Lenzerheide	16th	33rd	33rd	20th	19th	—	9th

=== World Cup ===
Season	Individual		Sprint		Pursuit		Mass Start		Overall	
Season	Points	Position	Points	Position	Points	Position	Points	Position	Points	Position
2009–10	—	—	—	—	—	—	—	—	—	—
2010–11	—	—	40	56th	6	80th	—	—	46	71st
2011–12	14	52nd	11	81st	8	74th	—	—	33	76th
2012–13	43	24th	85	42nd	88	34th	13	45th	229	36th
2013–14	23	34th	138	21st	191	11th	93	7th	445	16th
2014–15	19	44th	186	19th	93	27th	72	26th	370	27th
2015–16	—	—	161	19th	151	18th	82	24th	394	20th
2016–17	38	27th	160	16th	171	19th	76	26th	445	21st
2017–18	60	6th	224	5th	134	19th	63	28th	481	13th
2018–19	46	21st	139	22nd	122	24th	88	21st	395	20th
2019–20	48	23rd	100	26th	51	31st	27	33rd	226	29th
2022–23	56	22nd	136	19th	73	30th	84	19th	349	22nd
2023–24	118	6th	74	32nd	119	23rd	122	10th	433	17th
2024–25	65	18th	62	37th	47	35th	70	26th	244	28th
2025–26	68	12th	26	51st	10	70th	37	27th	141	38th

*Key:Points—won World Cup points; Position—World Cup season ranking.

=== European Championships ===
Event	Individual	Sprint	Pursuit	Relay
2007 Bansko, Bulgaria	32nd	8th	16th	
2008 Nové Město, Czech Republic	28th	30th	31st	
2009 Ufa, Russia		8th		
2010 Otepää, Estonia	15th	49th		
2011 Ridanna, Italy	4th	8th	7th	
2012 Osrblie, Slovakia	27th	5th	5th	
2013 Bansko, Bulgaria	4th	DNS		
2014 Nové Město, Czech Republic	Gold	Bronze		
2015 Otepää, Estonia	DNF	10th	10th	
2017 Duszniki-Zdrój, Poland	20th	4th	Bronze	
2018 Ridnaun, Italy		Gold		
2019 Raubichi, Belarus	24th	8th	5th	
2020 Raubichi, Belarus	9th	Silver	10th	
2021 Duszniki-Zdrój, Poland	Disqualified	22nd		
2023 Lenzerheide, Switzerland	33rd	4th	4th	
2024 Osrblie, Slovakia	9th	4th	13th	

At the 2021 European Championships, Rastorgujevs was placed 1st in the 20 km individual sprint and received the gold medal, but his result was later disqualified.

== World Cup record ==
=== Individual podiums ===
No.	Season	Date	Location	Race	Place
1	2016–17	19 March 2017	(Norway) Oslo Holmenkollen	Mass Start	2nd
2	2017–18	8 March 2018	(Finland) Kontiolahti	Sprint	2nd
3	2024–25	15 January 2025	(Germany) Ruhpolding	Individual	3rd

=== Relay podiums ===
No.	Season	Date	Location	Race	Place	Teammate(s)
1	2022–23	5 March 2023	(Czech Republic) Nové Město	Single Mixed Relay	3rd	Bendika

=== Shooting ===
Shooting	2009–10	2010–11	2011–12	2012–13	2013–14	2014–15	2015–16	2016–17	2019–20	2020–21	2022–23
Prone position	56%	82%	84%	TBD	91%	80%	92%	87%	76%	81%	86%
Standing position	62%	73%	81%	TBD	76%	76%	72%	69%	78%	77%	72%
Total	59%	78%	82%	TBD	83%	78%	82%	78%	77%	79%	79%
