= Biathlon European Championships 2009 – Women's 4 x 6 km Relay =

The women's relay competition of the Biathlon European Championships 2009 was held on March 4, 2009.

Place	Country	Team	Penalties	Time
1	Ukraine	Olena Pidhrushna; Valj Semerenko; Inna Suprun; Vita Semerenko	1:14:37.65	0+2 - 0+0; 0+2 - 0+2; 0+0 - 0+1; 0+0 - 0+2
2	Russia	Anastasiya Kuznetsova; Ekaterina Yurlova; Mariya Panfilova; Liobov Petrova	+2:34.8	0+2 - 0+0; 0+1 - 0+1; 0+0 - 1+3; 0+1 - 0+2
3	Germany	Tina Bachmann; Carolin Hennecke; Anne Preussler; Juliane Döll	+3:47.1	0+2 - 1+3; 0+1 - 0+1; 0+1 - 0+3; 0+0 - 0+0
4	France	Marine Bolliet; Marion Blondeau; Marine Dusser; Sophie Boilley	+4:24.3	0+0 - 0+0; 0+0 - 1+3; 0+0 - 0+2; 0+0 - 0+1
5	Norway	Fanny Welle-Strand Horn; Birgitte Røksund; Synnøve Solemdal; Kjersti Isaksen	+5:35.6	0+1 - 2+3; 0+0 - 0+1; 0+1 - 0+1; 0+0 - 0+0
6	Canada	Jessica Sedlock; Cynthia Clark; Claude Godbout; Rosanna Crawford	+10:03.8	1+3 - 0+1; 0+0 - 0+1; 0+2 - 0+3; 0+0 - 0+0
7	Poland	Karolina Pitoń; Katarzyna Leja; Magdalena Kępka; Katarzyna Jakieła	+14:31.9	2+3 - 4+3; 0+1 - 0+2; 0+1 - 0+0; 0+1 - 0+0
