= Biathlon European Championships 2008 =

International biathlon competition

The 15th Biathlon European Championships were held in Nové Město na Moravě, Czech Republic, from February 20 to February 24, 2008.

There were total of 16 competitions held: sprint, pursuit, individual and relay both for U26 and U21.

== Schedule of events ==
The schedule of the event stands below.

Date	Event
February 20	U26 Men's 20 km individual
February 20	U26 Women's 15 km individual
February 20	U21 Men's 20 km individual
February 20	U21 Women's 15 km individual
February 22	U26 Men's 10 km sprint
February 22	U26 Women's 7.5 km sprint
February 22	U21 Men's 10 km sprint
February 22	U21 Women's 7.5 km sprint
February 23	U26 Men's 12.5 km pursuit
February 23	U26 Women's 10 km pursuit
February 23	U21 Men's 12.5 km pursuit
February 23	U21 Women's 10 km pursuit
February 24	U26 Men's 4*7.5 km relay
February 24	U26 Women's 4*6 km relay
February 24	U21 Men's 4*7.5 km relay
February 24	U21 Women's 3*6 km relay

== Results ==
=== U26 ===
==== Men's ====
Competition	1st	2nd	3rd
Men's 10 km sprint	(Russia) Artem Gussev	(Norway) Stian Eckhoff	(Czech Republic) Michal Šlesingr
Men's 12.5 km pursuit	(Russia) Sergei Konovalov	(Russia) Artem Gussev	(Russia) Maxim Maksimov
Men's 20 km individual	(Poland) Tomasz Sikora	(Czech Republic) Michal Šlesingr	(Russia) Sergei Balandin
Men's 4*7.5 km relay	(Russia) Russia; Sergei Balandin; Sergei Konovalov; Maxim Maksimov; Artem Gussev	(Norway) Norway; Stian Nåvik; Lars Berger; Stian Eckhoff; Magne Thorleiv Rønning	(Czech Republic) Czech Republic; Michal Šlesingr; Tomáš Holubec; Ondřej Moravec; Zdeněk Vítek

==== Women's ====
Competition	1st	2nd	3rd
Women's 7.5 km sprint	(Ukraine) Oksana Yakovleva	(Czech Republic) Zuzana Tryznová	(Ukraine) Nina Karasevych
Women's 10 km pursuit	(Ukraine) Nina Karasevych	(Ukraine) Oksana Yakovleva	(Bulgaria) Pavlina Filipova
Women's 15 km individual	(Moldova) Natalia Levchenkova	(Norway) Kjersti Isaksen	(Ukraine) Lilia Vaygina-Yefremova
Women's 4*6 km relay	(Ukraine) Ukraine; Oksana Yakovleva; Vita Semerenko; Valj Semerenko; Oksana Khvostenko	(Germany) Germany; Tina Bachmann; Ute Niziak; Juliane Döll; Jenny Adler	(Norway) Norway; Liv-Kjersti Eikeland; Elise Ringen; Kjersti Isaksen; Eline Fannemel

=== U21 ===
==== Men's ====
Competition	1st	2nd	3rd
Men's 10 km sprint	(Russia) Anton Shipulin	(Bulgaria) Krasimir Anev	(Austria) Daniel Salvenmoser
Men's 12.5 km pursuit	(Russia) Anton Shipulin	(Austria) Daniel Salvenmoser	(Switzerland) Benjamin Weger
Men's 20 km individual	(Russia) Anton Shipulin	(Austria) Dominik Landertinger	(Bulgaria) Krasimir Anev
Men's 4*7.5 km relay	(Russia) Russia; Dmitriy Blinov; Anton Shipulin; Pavel Magazeev; Victor Vasilyev	(Austria) Austria; Daniel Salvenmoser; Mario Drescher; Sven Grossegger; Dominik Landertinger	(Ukraine) Ukraine; Vitaliy Kozhushko; Andriy Vozniak; Artem Pryma; Vitaliy Kilchytskyy

==== Women's ====
Competition	1st	2nd	3rd
Women's 7.5 km sprint	(Norway) Elise Ringen	(Austria) Iris Schwabl	(Russia) Irina Starykh
Women's 10 km pursuit	(France) Marine Bolliet	(Poland) Karolina Pitoń	(Czech Republic) Veronika Vítková
Women's 15 km individual	(France) Marine Bolliet	(Czech Republic) Veronika Vítková	(Russia) Mariya Panfilova
Women's 3*6 km relay	(Russia) Russia; Olga Vilukhina; Mariya Panfilova; Irina Starykh	(Czech Republic) Czech Republic; Veronika Zvařičová; Veronika Chorejřy; Veronika Vítková	(Romania) Romania; Alina Babes; Klaudia Flanheya; Réka Forika

== Medal table ==
№	Country	Gold	Silver	Bronze	Total
1	Russia	8	1	4	13
2	Ukraine	3	1	3	7
3	France	2			2
4	Norway	1	3	1	5
5	Poland	1	1		2
6	Moldova	1			1
7	Czech Republic		4	3	7
8	Austria		4	1	5
9	Bulgaria		1	2	3
10	Germany		1		1
11	Romania			1	1
11	Switzerland			1	1
