= Biathlon European Championships 2009 =

International biathlon competition

The 16th Biathlon European Championships were held in Ufa, Russia from February 28 to March 4, 2009.

There were total of 16 competitions held: sprint, pursuit, individual and relay both for U26 and U21.

== Schedule of events ==
Biathlon European Championships 2009 official logo

The schedule of the event stands below. All times in CET.

Date	Event
February 28	U26 Men's 10 km sprint
February 28	U26 Women's 7.5 km sprint
February 28	U21 Men's 10 km sprint
February 28	U21 Women's 7.5 km sprint
March 1	U26 Men's 12.5 km pursuit
March 1	U26 Women's 10 km pursuit
March 1	U21 Men's 12.5 km pursuit
March 1	U21 Women's 10 km pursuit
March 3	U26 Men's 20 km individual
March 3	U26 Women's 15 km individual
March 3	U21 Men's 20 km individual
March 3	U21 Women's 15 km individual
March 4	U26 Men's 4 × 7.5 km relay
March 4	U26 Women's 4 × 6 km relay
March 4	U21 Men's 4 × 7.5 km relay
March 4	U21 Women's 3 × 6 km relay

== Results ==
=== U26 ===
==== Men's ====
Competition	1st	2nd	3rd
Men's 10 km sprint	(Norway) Rune Brattsveen	(Russia) Evgeny Ustyugov	(Russia) Anton Shipulin
Men's 12.5 km pursuit	(Germany) Daniel Böhm	(Ukraine) Serhiy Sednev	(Norway) Rune Brattsveen
Men's 20 km individual	(Russia) Victor Vasilyev	(Norway) Dag Erik Kokkin	(Ukraine) Serhiy Sednev
Men's 4 × 7.5 km relay	(Norway) Norway; Dag Erik Kokkin; Henrik L'Abée-Lund; Tarjei Bø; Rune Brattsveen	(Germany) Germany; Simon Schempp; Daniel Böhm; Norbert Schiller; Christoph Knie	(Russia) Russia; Vitaliy Noritsyn; Anton Shipulin; Alexander Shreyder; Victor Vasilyev

==== Women's ====
Competition	1st	2nd	3rd
Women's 7.5 km sprint	(Slovakia) Anastasiya Kuzmina	(Russia) Yana Romanova	(Russia) Anastasia Tokareva
Women's 10 km pursuit	(Slovakia) Anastasiya Kuzmina	(Ukraine) Vita Semerenko	(Russia) Yana Romanova
Women's 15 km individual	(Germany) Juliane Döll	(Germany) Anne Preussler	(Russia) Liobov Petrova
Women's 4 × 6 km relay	(Ukraine) Ukraine; Olena Pidhrushna; Valj Semerenko; Inna Suprun; Vita Semerenko	(Russia) Russia; Anastasiya Kuznetsova; Ekaterina Yurlova; Mariya Panfilova; Liobov Petrova	(Germany) Germany; Tina Bachmann; Carolin Hennecke; Anne Preussler; Juliane Döll

=== U21 ===
==== Men's ====
Competition	1st	2nd	3rd
Men's 10 km sprint	(Norway) Tarjei Bø	(Germany) Simon Schempp	(Belarus) Vladimir Chepelin
Men's 12.5 km pursuit	(Norway) Tarjei Bø	(Germany) Simon Schempp	(Russia) Alexey Volkov
Men's 20 km individual	(Norway) Tarjei Bø	(Ukraine) Serhiy Semenov	(Russia) Nazir Rabadanov
Men's 4 × 7.5 km relay	(Russia) Russia; Nazir Rabadanow; Sergey Kugubaev; Timofey Lapshin; Alexey Volkov	(Ukraine) Ukraine; Mykhaylo Serdyuk; Vitaliy Kilchytskyy; Vitaliy Sokolyuk; Nazariy Burik	(Belarus) Belarus; Sergey Rutsevich; Vladimir Chepelin; Vitali Tsvetau; Vladimir Alenishko

==== Women's ====
Competition	1st	2nd	3rd
Women's 7.5 km sprint	(Russia) Olga Vilukhina	(Russia) Anastasia Kalina	(France) Marine Bolliet
Women's 10 km pursuit	(Russia) Olga Vilukhina	(Russia) Anastasia Romanova	(France) Marine Bolliet
Women's 15 km individual	(Russia) Olga Vilukhina	(Norway) Synnøve Solemdal	(Ukraine) Juliya Dzhyma
Women's 3 × 6 km relay	(Russia) Russia; Anastasia Romanova; Anastasia Kalina; Olga Vilukhina	(Belarus) Belarus; Darya Yurkevich; Marya Kozlovskaya; Ala Talkach	(Romania) Romania; Luminița Pișcoran; Diana Mihalache; Réka Ferencz

== Medal table ==
№	Country	Gold	Silver	Bronze	Total
1	Russia	6	5	7	18
2	Norway	5	2	1	8
3	Germany	3	3	1	7
4	Slovakia	2			2
5	Ukraine	1	4	2	7
6	Belarus		1	2	3
7	France			2	2
8	Romania			1	1
