= Oksana Yakovlieva =

Ukrainian biathlete (born 1980)

Personal information
- Nationality: Ukrainian
- Born: 6 October 1980 (age 45)

Sport
- Sport: Biathlon
Medal record
Women's biathlon
Representing Ukraine
World Championships
Silver medal – second place	2003 Khanty-Mansiysk	4 × 6 km relay
Silver medal – second place	2008 Östersund	4 × 6 km relay
European Championships
Gold medal – first place	2001 Maurienne	15 km individual
Gold medal – first place	2007 Bansko	15 km individual
Gold medal – first place	2008 Nové Město	7.5 km sprint
Gold medal – first place	2008 Nové Město	4 × 6 km relay
Silver medal – second place	2005 Novosibirsk	4 x 6 km relay
Silver medal – second place	2008 Nové Město	10 km pursuit
Bronze medal – third place	2001 Maurienne	4 × 6 km relay
Bronze medal – third place	2002 Kontiolahti	4 × 6 km relay
Bronze medal – third place	2007 Bansko	4 x 6 km relay
Winter Universiade
Gold medal – first place	2007 Turin	15 km individual
Silver medal – second place	2003 Tarvisio	Relay
Silver medal – second place	2005 Innsbruck	15 km individual
Silver medal – second place	2007 Turin	Relay
Bronze medal – third place	2001 Zakopane	Relay

Oksana Yakovlieva (born 6 October 1980) is a Ukrainian biathlete. She competed in the women's individual event at the 2002 Winter Olympics.
