= Krasimir Anev =

Bulgarian biathlete

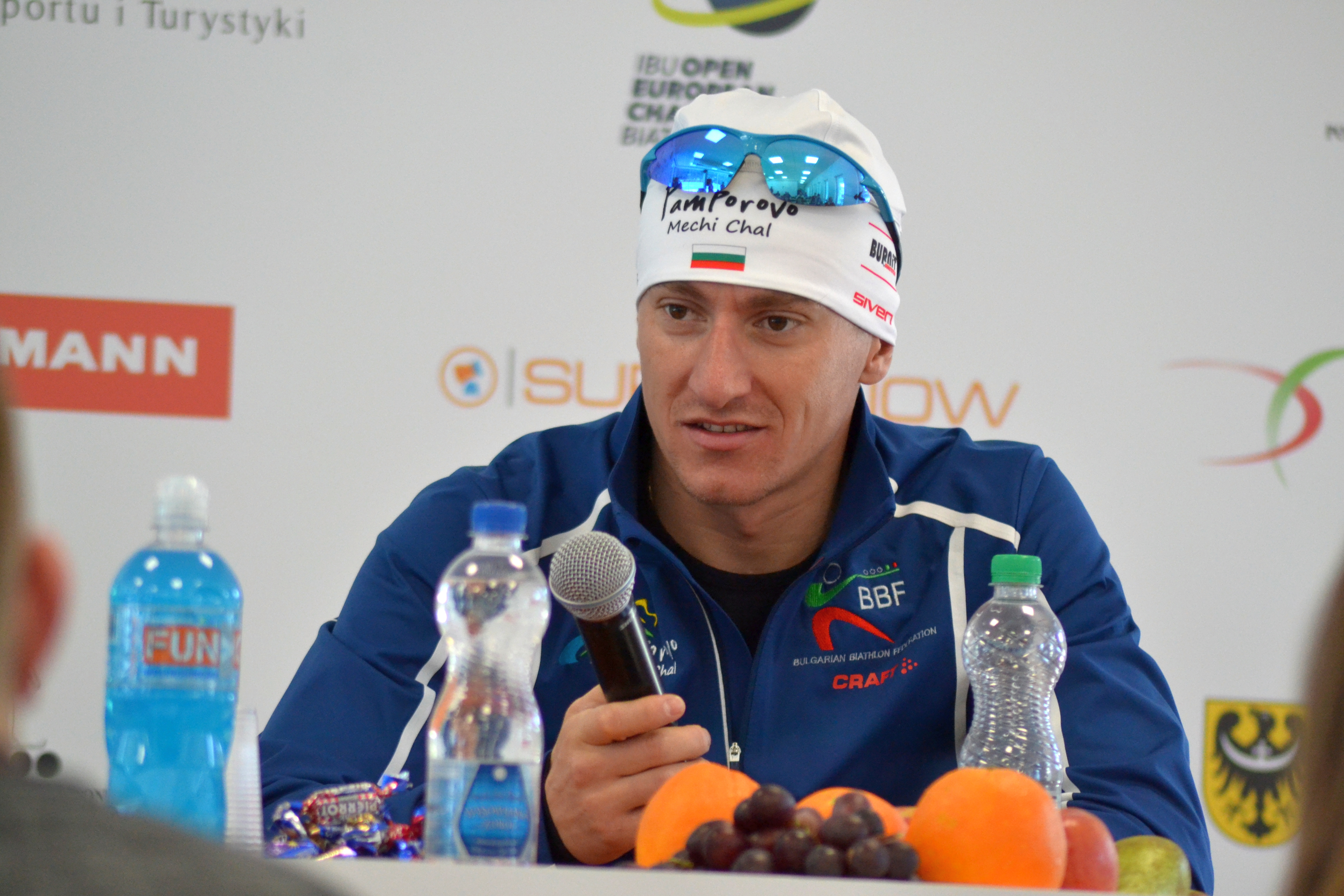
- Anev at the 2017 European Championships

Personal information
- Born: 16 June 1987 (age 39) Samokov, PR Bulgaria
- Height: 1.74 m (5 ft 9 in)

Sport
- Sport: Skiing
- Club: Borovets 2016

World Cup career
- Seasons: 2004–2020
Medal record
Men's biathlon
Representing Bulgaria
European Championships
Gold medal – first place	2019 Raubichi	Individual
Silver medal – second place	2011 Ridnaun	Pursuit
Silver medal – second place	2015 Otepää	Pursuit
Silver medal – second place	2017 Duszniki-Zdrój	Individual
Silver medal – second place	2018 Ridnaun	Pursuit
Bronze medal – third place	2011 Ridnaun	Individual
Bronze medal – third place	2013 Bansko	Individual
Bronze medal – third place	2017 Duszniki-Zdrój	Sprint
Bronze medal – third place	2018 Ridnaun	Sprint
European Junior Championships
Gold medal – first place	2007 Bansko	U-21 Individual
Silver medal – second place	2007 Bansko	U-21 Pursuit
Silver medal – second place	2008 Nové Město	U-21 Individual
Bronze medal – third place	2008 Nové Město	U-21 Pursuit
Universiade
Silver medal – second place	2011 Erzurum	Individual
Silver medal – second place	2011 Erzurum	Mass start
Bronze medal – third place	2011 Erzurum	Mixed relay
World Military Games
Bronze medal – third place	2017 Sochi	10 km sprint
- Updated on 26 June 2020

Krasimir Anev (Bulgarian: Красимир Анев); born 16 June 1987 in Samokov) is a Bulgarian former biathlete.

His best result for the World Cup is a 4th place in the mass start in Oberhof, Germany, in the fourth race of the 2014/15 season. He competed at nine Biathlon World Championships between 2008 and 2017 and the Olympic Games in Vancouver in 2010, in Sochi in 2014 and in Pyeongchang in 2018. He ended his career after the 2019/20 season.

== Biathlon results ==
All results are sourced from the International Biathlon Union.

=== Olympic Games ===
0 medals

Event	Individual	Sprint	Pursuit	Mass start	Relay	Mixed relay
(Canada) 2010 Vancouver	25th	25th	45th	—	16th	—N/a
(Russia) 2014 Sochi	35th	48th	48th	—	15th	—
(South Korea) 2018 Pyeongchang	25th	37th	45th	—	16th	17th

*The mixed relay was added as an event in 2014.

=== World Championships ===
0 medals

Event	Individual	Sprint	Pursuit	Mass start	Relay	Mixed relay
(Sweden) 2008 Östersund	38th	56th	51st	—	—	—
(South Korea) 2009 Pyeongchang	36th	36th	45th	—	—	—
(Russia) 2010 Khanty-Mansiysk	—N/a	—N/a	—N/a	—N/a	—N/a	16th
(Russia) 2011 Khanty-Mansiysk	51st	—	—	—	16th	—
(Germany) 2012 Ruhpolding	19th	52nd	dns	—	17th	22nd
(Czech Republic) 2013 Nové Město	37th	11th	19th	—	9th	15th
(Finland) 2015 Kontiolahti	19th	52nd	49th	—	16th	18th
(Norway) 2016 Oslo Holmenkollen	12th	34th	29th	25th	13th	16th
(Austria) 2017 Hochfilzen	16th	6th	7th	12th	9th	—
(Sweden) 2019 Östersund	27th	28th	39th	—	9th	—
(Italy) 2020 Antholz-Anterselva	18th	30th	13th	16th	11th	—

*During Olympic seasons competitions are only held for those events not included in the Olympic program.
**The mixed relay was added as an event in 2005.
