= Katharina Komatz =

Austrian biathlete (born 1991)

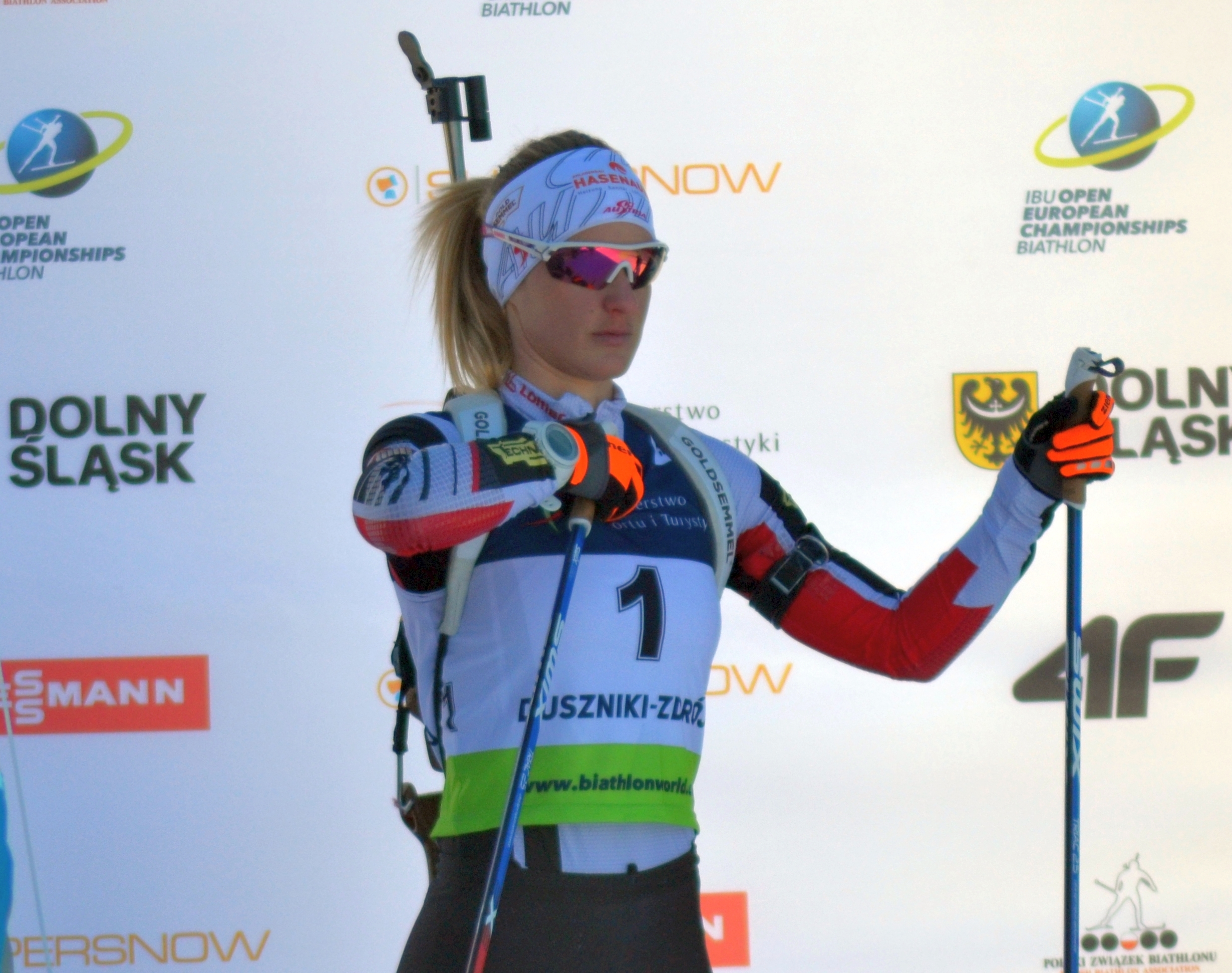
- Innerhofer during the Open European Championships in Duszniki-Zdrój, Poland in January 2017

Personal information
- Born: Katharina Innerhofer; 17 January 1991 (age 35) Zell am See, Austria
- Height: 1.66 m (5 ft 5 in)

Sport

Professional information
- Sport: Biathlon
- World Cup debut: 6 January 2011

Olympic Games
- Teams: 1 (2014)
- Medals: 0

World Championships
- Teams: 3 (2012, 2013, 2015)
- Medals: 0

World Cup
- Seasons: 5 (2010/11–)
- Individual victories: 1
- All victories: 1
- Individual podiums: 1
- All podiums: 1
- Updated on 22 March 2015

Katharina Komatz (née Innerhofer; born 17 January 1991) is an Austrian biathlete. She competed at the Biathlon World Championships 2012 and 2013, and at the 2014 Winter Olympics in Sochi.

On 6 March 2014, Innerhofer won her first World Cup event by finishing first in a sprint competition in Pokljuka. Before this victory, her best result in the World Cup was 22nd place in an individual race in Ruhpolding. It was also a first-ever victory in the World Cup for an Austrian female biathlete.

== Biathlon results ==
All results are sourced from the International Biathlon Union.

=== Olympic Games ===
0 medals

Event	Individual	Sprint	Pursuit	Mass start	Relay	Mixed relay
(Russia) 2014 Sochi	27th	73rd	—	—	9th	—
(South Korea) 2018 Pyeongchang	60th	29th	40th	—	—	10th
(China) 2022 Beijing	26th	21st	22nd	14th	9th	—

:*The mixed relay was added as an event in 2014.

=== World Championships ===
0 medals

Event	Individual	Sprint	Pursuit	Mass start	Relay	Mixed relay	Single mixed relay
(Austria) 2017 Hochfilzen	—	60th	56th	—	—	—	—
(Sweden) 2019 Östersund	—	49th	40th	—	16th	17th	—
(Italy) 2020 Rasen-Antholz	20th	19th	28th	19th	12th	8th	—
(Slovenia) 2021 Pokljuka	46th	39th	37th	—	7th	—	—

*During Olympic seasons competitions are only held for those events not included in the Olympic program.

=== Individual victories ===
1 victory (1 Sp)

Season	Date	Location	Discipline	Level
2013–14; 1 victory (1 Sp)	6 March 2014	(Slovenia) Pokljuka	10 km sprint	Biathlon World Cup

*Results are from UIPMB and IBU races which include the Biathlon World Cup, Biathlon World Championships and the Winter Olympic Games.

== Personal life ==
Katharina Innerhofer was born in Zell am See, Salzburg, Austria. She has been married to the Austrian biathlete David Komatz since 2022 and bears his last name. In 2023, the two became parents to a son.
