= 2017 IBU Open European Championships =

International biathlon competition

The 24th IBU Open European Championships were held in Duszniki-Zdrój, Poland from January 25 to January 29, 2017.

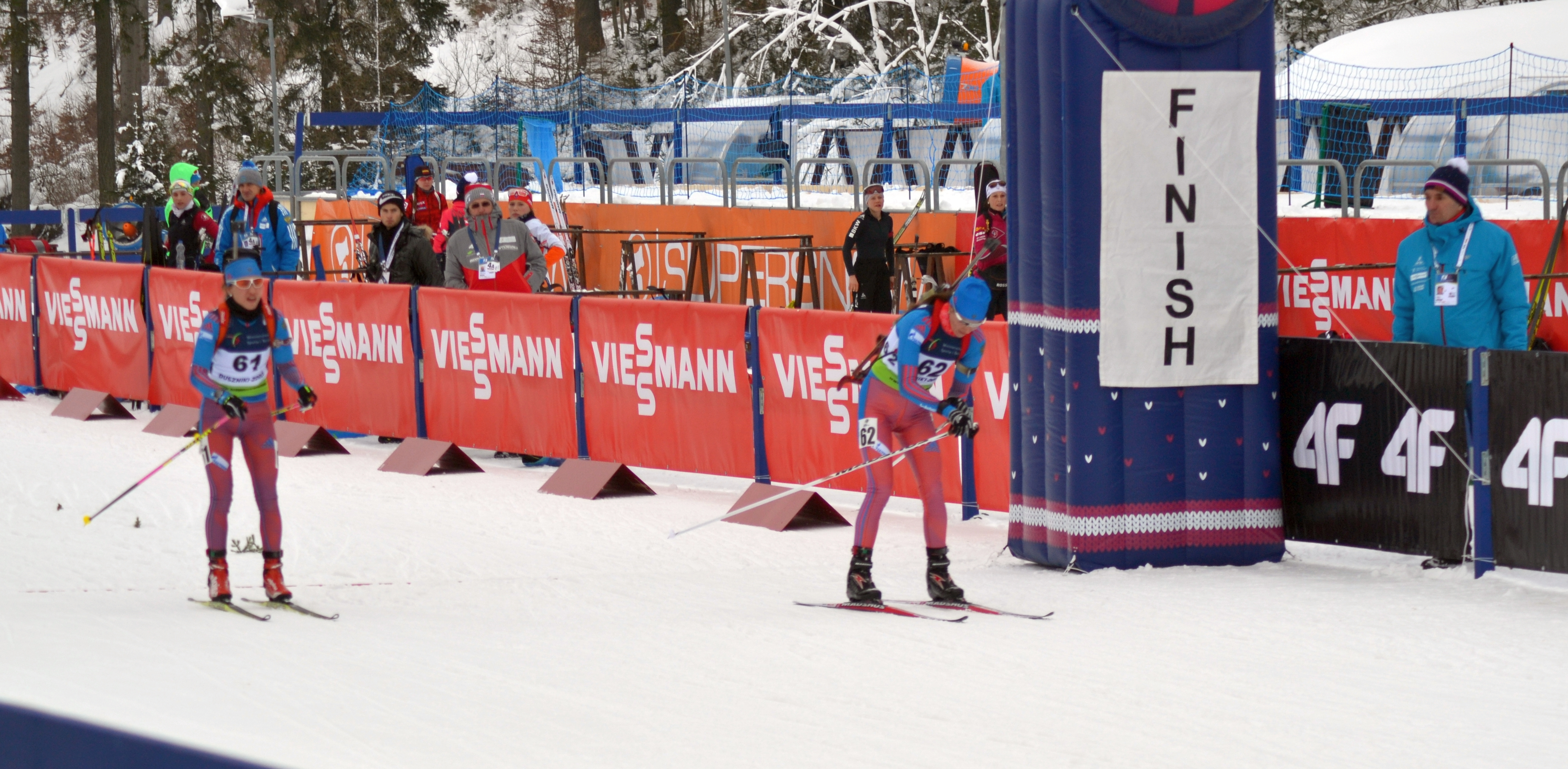
Irina Starykh wins at the finish line of woman's individual race

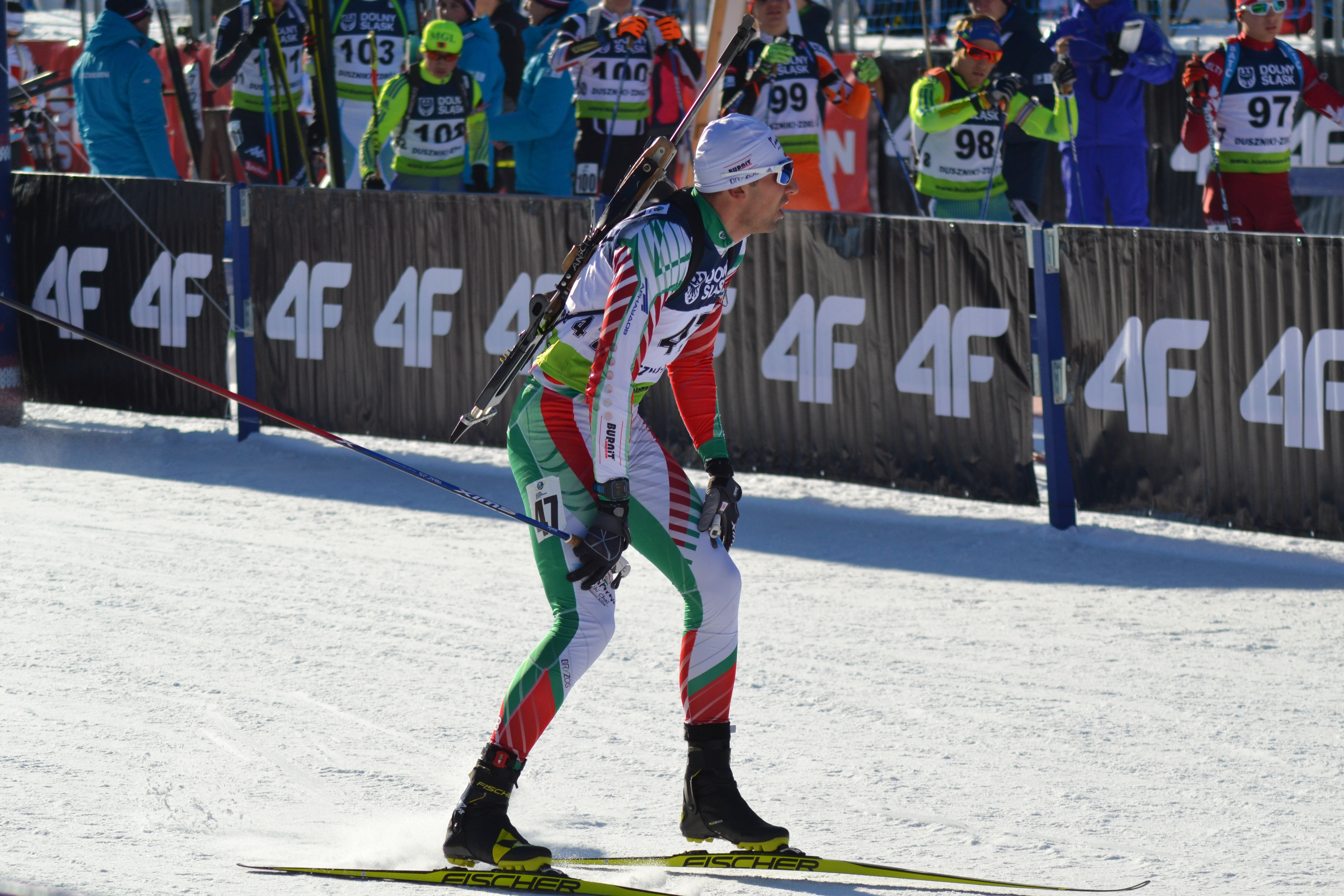
Vladimir Iliev at finish of the men's sprint race

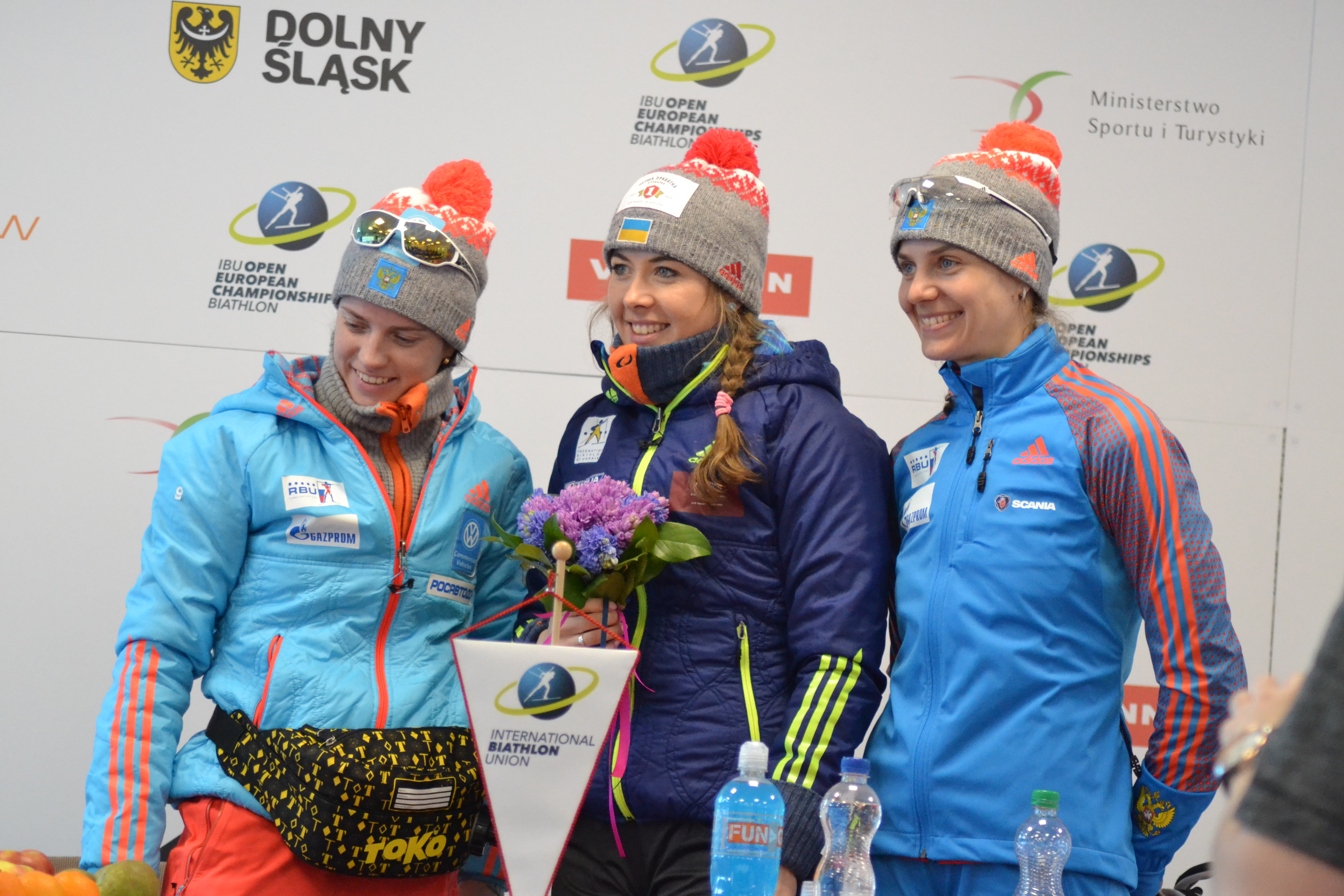
Svetlana Sleptsova, Irina Starykh and Juliya Dzhyma at the winner's press conference after the women's sprint race

There were total of 8 competitions held: Single Mixed Relay, Relay Mixed, Sprint Women, Sprint Men, Pursuit Women, Pursuit Men, Individual Women and Individual Men.

== Schedule of events ==
The schedule of the event stands below. All times in CET.

Date	Time	Event
January 25	10:00	Individual Men
January 25	13:30	Individual Women
January 27	10:00	Sprint Men
January 27	13:30	Sprint Women
January 28	10:00	Pursuit Men
January 28	13:00	Pursuit Women
January 29	10:00	Single Mixed Relay
January 29	13:00	Relay Mixed

== Results ==
=== Men's ===
Event	Gold		Silver		Bronze	
Men's 20 km individual Details	Alexandr Loginov; Russia	49:54.3 (1+0+0+0)	Krasimir Anev; Bulgaria	50:05.7 (0+0+0+0)	Alexey Slepov; Russia	50:47.9 (0+0+0+0)
Men's 10 km sprint Details	Vladimir Iliev; Bulgaria	24:26.9 (0+1)	Alexandr Loginov; Russia	24:31.8 (0+0)	Krasimir Anev; Bulgaria	24:43.6 (0+0)
Men's 12.5 km pursuit Details	Alexandr Loginov; Russia	31:46.2 (0+0+0+1)	Evgeniy Garanichev; Russia	32:14.0 (0+0+1+0)	Andrejs Rastorgujevs; Latvia	32:45.7 (0+1+1+2)

=== Women's ===
Event	Gold		Silver		Bronze	
Women's 15 km individual Details	Irina Starykh; Russia	44:24.7 (0+0+0+0)	Svetlana Sleptsova; Russia	45:28.5 (0+1+0+0)	Anastasiya Merkushyna; Ukraine	45:29.7 (0+1+0+0)
Women's 7.5 km sprint Details	Juliya Dzhyma; Ukraine	21:02.3 (0+0)	Svetlana Sleptsova; Russia	21:29.3 (0+0)	Irina Starykh; Russia	21:40.1 (0+1)
Women's 10 km pursuit Details	Irina Starykh; Russia	30:04.4 (0+0+0+0)	Juliya Dzhyma; Ukraine	30:24.2 (0+0+1+1)	Svetlana Sleptsova; Russia	30:36.5 (0+1+0+0)

=== Mixed ===
Event	Gold		Silver		Bronze	
Single mixed relay Details	Russia; Daria Virolaynen; Evgeniy Garanichev; Daria Virolaynen; Evgeniy Garanichev	37:10.2 (0+0) (0+2) (0+0) (0+0) (0+0) (0+2) (0+2) (0+1)	Norway; Ingrid Landmark Tandrevold; Vetle Sjåstad Christiansen; Ingrid Landmark Tandrevold; Vetle Sjåstad Christiansen	37:16.5 (0+0) (0+0) (0+2) (0+1) (0+0) (0+1) (0+0) (0+3)	Poland; Krystyna Guzik; Grzegorz Guzik; Krystyna Guzik; Grzegorz Guzik	37:24.1 (0+0) (0+0) (0+0) (0+2) (0+2) (0+0) (0+0) (0+1)
2 x 6 + 2 x 7.5 km relay Details	Russia; Irina Starykh; Svetlana Sleptsova; Alexey Volkov; Alexandr Loginov	1:12:26.0 (0+0) (0+1) (0+0) (0+1) (0+1) (0+0) (0+3) (0+0)	(Norway) Norway; Karoline Erdal; Marion Rønning Huber; Erlend Bjøntegaard; Fredrik Gjesbakk	1:13:02.4 (0+0) (0+2) (0+0) (0+1) (0+3) (0+1) (0+1) (0+1)	(Ukraine) Ukraine; Anastasiya Merkushyna; Juliya Dzhyma; Oleksander Zhyrnyi; Ruslan Tkalenko	1:13:03.1 (0+0) (0+1) (0+2) (1+3) (0+0) (0+0) (0+0) (0+0)

== Medal table ==
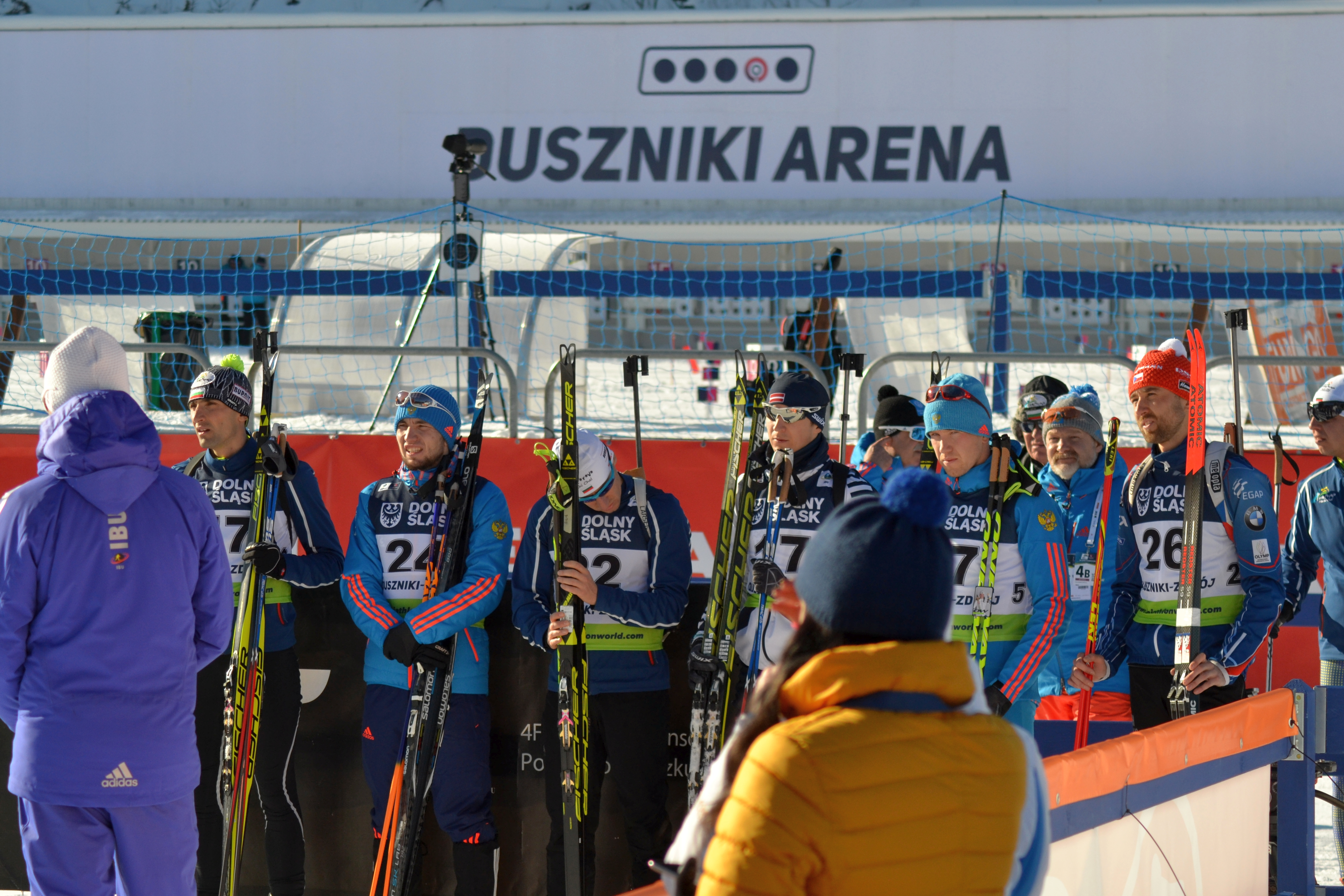
Men's Sprint Flower Ceremony

Rank	Nation	Gold	Silver	Bronze	Total
1	Russia (RUS)	6	4	3	13
2	Ukraine (UKR)	1	1	2	4
3	Bulgaria (BUL)	1	1	1	3
4	Norway (NOR)	0	2	0	2
5	Latvia (LAT)	0	0	1	1
5	Poland (POL)	0	0	1	1
Totals (6 entries)		8	8	8	24
