= Yuliia Dzhima =

Ukrainian biathlete (born 1990)

Yuliia Dzhyma
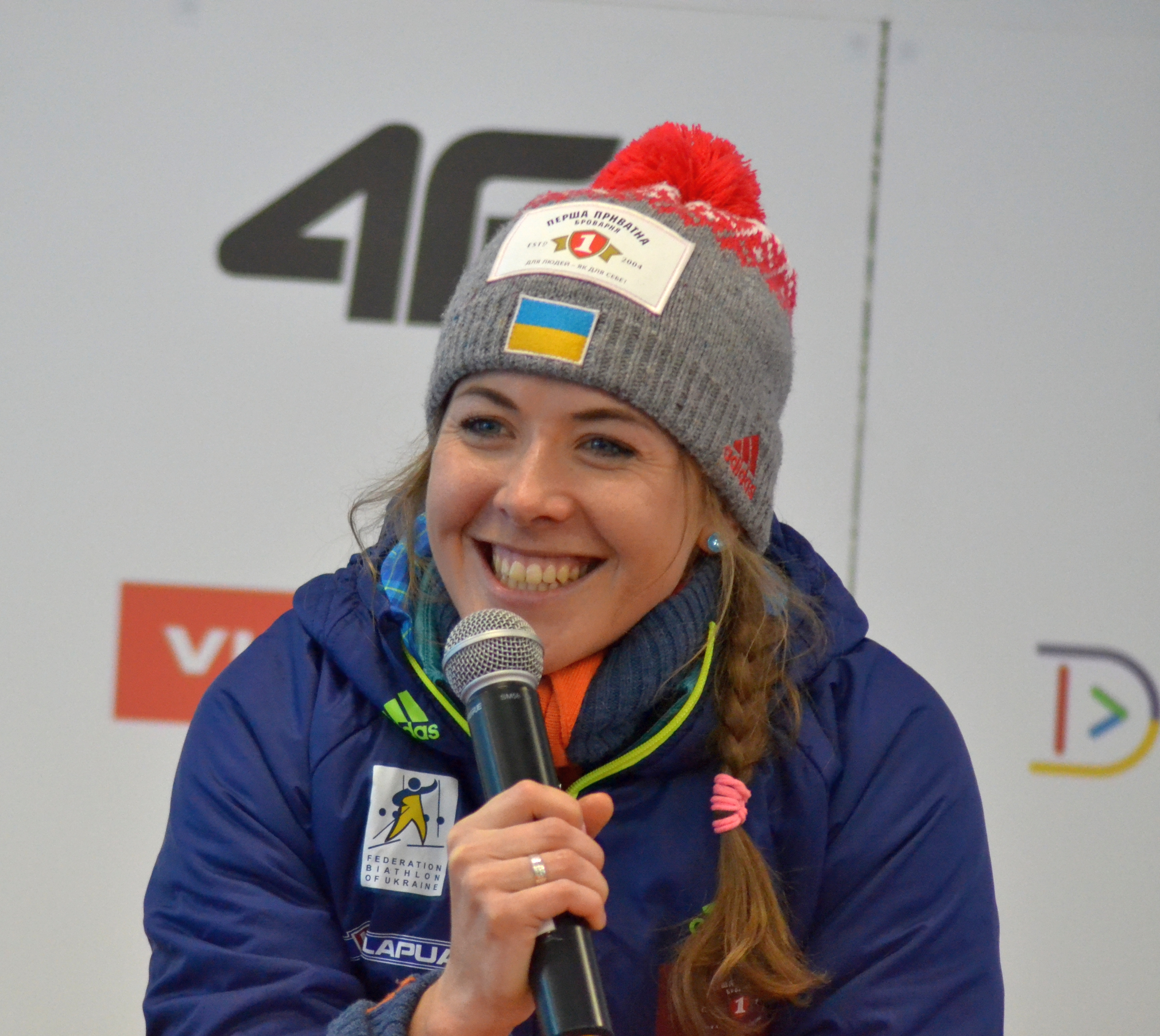
- Dzhyma in 2017

Personal information
- Born: 19 September 1990 (age 35) Kyiv, Ukrainian SSR
- Height: 1.66 m (5 ft 5 in)
- Weight: 66 kg (146 lb)

Sport

Professional information
- Club: Skhid Kyiv
- World Cup debut: 2012

Olympic Games
- Teams: 4 (2014, 2018, 2022, 2026)
- Medals: 1 (1 gold)

World Championships
- Teams: 10 (2012–2024)
- Medals: 5 (0 gold)

World Cup
- Seasons: 8 (2011/12–)
- Individual victories: 1
- Individual podiums: 5
Medal record
Women's biathlon
Representing Ukraine
Olympic Games
Gold medal – first place	2014 Sochi	4 × 6 km relay
World Championships
Silver medal – second place	2013 Nové Město	4 x 6 km relay
Silver medal – second place	2017 Hochfilzen	4 x 6 km relay
Bronze medal – third place	2019 Östersund	4 x 6 km relay
Bronze medal – third place	2020 Antholz	4 x 6 km relay
Bronze medal – third place	2021 Pokljuka	4 x 6 km relay
European Championships
Gold medal – first place	2011 Ridanna	Relay
Gold medal – first place	2012 Osrblie	Relay
Gold medal – first place	2015 Otepää	Relay
Gold medal – first place	2017 Duszniki-Zdrój	Sprint
Gold medal – first place	2020 Raubichi	Mixed relay
Silver medal – second place	2013 Bansko	Sprint
Silver medal – second place	2017 Duszniki-Zdrój	Pursuit
Silver medal – second place	2023 Lenzerheide	Individual
Bronze medal – third place	2013 Bansko	Relay
Bronze medal – third place	2017 Duszniki-Zdrój	Mixed relay
Junior European Championships
Bronze medal – third place	2009 Ufa	Individual
- Updated on 25 January 2023

Yuliia Valentynivna Dzhyma (Ukrainian: Юлія Валентинівна Джима; born 19 September 1990) is a Ukrainian World Cup level biathlete. She is Olympic champion in women's relay, multiple World championships medalist. She is one of the most successful Ukrainian biathletes of the 2010s.

== Career ==
She took up biathlon in Kyiv, where she lives. She wasn't seen as a promising rising athlete at the beginning of her sporting career. She didn't show promising results in skiing, so trainers were doubtful whether she would be a good biathlete.

In January 2008, she competed in her first international competition, Junior World Championships in German Ruhpolding. For the next three years, she was a member of the Ukrainian junior team. Dzhyma had good results, including bronze in the individual race at 2009 Junior European Championships.

On 4 January 2012, she debuted in German Oberhof in the women's relay with a team which later would win Olympic gold. Then they finished 8th. In two days, she had her first race in sprint, finishing 34th. Next season, 2012–13, she had one victory and two podiums in relay races. In 2013–14 season, she had her first podium in pursuit in Austrian Hochfilzen, finishing second. At the 2013 World Championships, she took silver in relay competition.

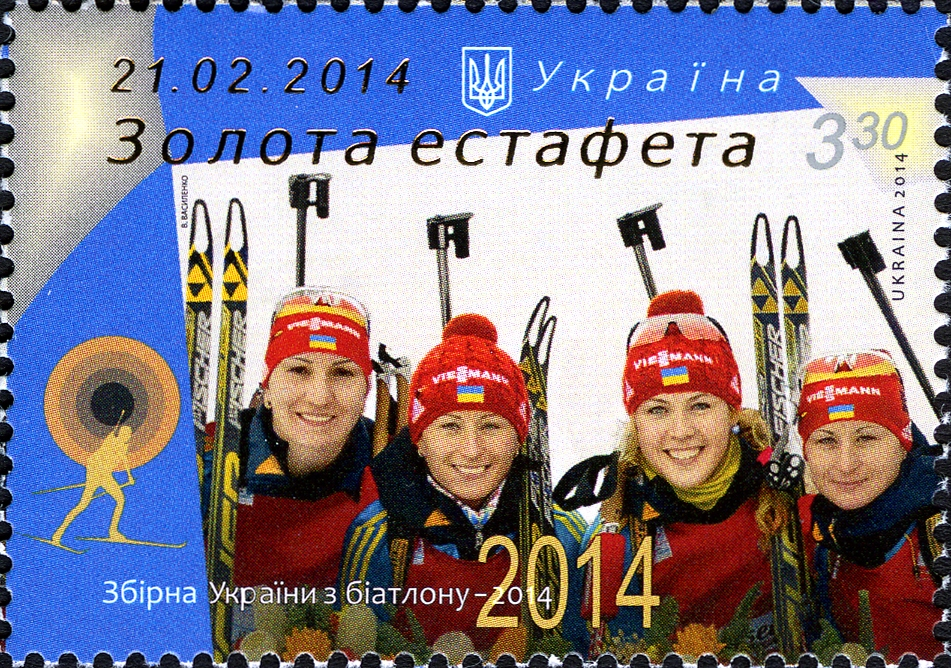
Stamps of Ukraine, 2014. Dzhima is second from right

Together with Vita Semerenko, Valentyna Semerenko and Olena Bilosiuk she won the gold medal in the Women's relay at the 2014 Winter Olympics, in Sochi, Russia.

The following two seasons after the Olympics weren't very successful, but she had some Top-10 results. Her performances improved in 2016–17 season: in all World Cup rankings, she achieved her highest rankings, including a place in the Top-10 of the general World Cup classification for the first time in her career. That year, she won three medals at 2017 European Championships in Polish Duszniki-Zdrój, which was the most successful European championships for Yuliia. Next month, she received her second silver relay World Championships medal.

Pre-Olympic 2017–18 season started very successfully for her since in two opening races in Swedish Östersund, she finished third. On 28 December 2017, she participated in the prestigious commercial competition World Team Challenge, where she placed 5th together with Belgian biathlete Michael Rösch. She qualified to represent Ukraine at the 2018 Winter Olympics. Due to illness she didn't take part in sprint. Besides, Ukrainian coaches thought she would qualify for mass start. Still, they were incompetent regarding rules regarding mass start qualification, so Yuliia participated only in the individual race, where she was 20th. In relay competitions she was 7th in mixed relay and 11th in the classical relay.

She received the Best Athlete of a Month award from National Olympic Committee of Ukraine in January 2017.

== Personal life ==
Yuliia's father is a former Ukrainian biathlete, Valentyn Dzhyma, who participated in the 1994 Winter Olympics and finished his career the following year. Her mother is also an athlete.

Since childhood, her hobby has been painting.

Dzhyma studied foreign languages and social communications at Sumy State University.

After 2018 Winter Olympics, there were some rumors that Yuliia Dzyma was dating the head coach of the Ukrainian women's national team Uroš Velepec.

== Biathlon results ==
=== Olympic Games ===
1 medal (1 gold)

Event	Individual	Sprint	Pursuit	Mass start	Relay	Mixed relay
(Russia) 2014 Sochi	7th	42nd	DNS	22nd	Gold	—
(South Korea) 2018 Pyeongchang	20th	—	—	—	11th	7th
(China) 2022 Beijing	10th	8th	13th	7th	7th	13th
(Italy) 2026 Milano Cortina	53rd	24th	43rd	—	9th	—

=== World Championships ===
5 medals (2 silver, 3 bronze)

Event	Individual	Sprint	Pursuit	Mass start	Relay	Mixed relay	Single mixed relay
(Germany) 2012 Ruhpolding	—	39th	48th	—	—	—	—N/a
(Czech Republic) 2013 Nové Město	13th	—	—	—	Silver	9th	—N/a
(Finland) 2015 Kontiolahti	38th	—	—	—	6th	11th	—N/a
(Norway) 2016 Oslo	22nd	31st	9th	25th	5th	—	—N/a
(Austria) 2017 Hochfilzen	9th	22nd	23rd	6th	Silver	5th	—N/a
(Sweden) 2019 Östersund	12th	54th	DNS	—	Bronze	—	—
(Italy) 2020 Antholz-Anterselva	27th	22nd	19th	—	Bronze	5th	—
(Slovenia) 2021 Pokljuka	32nd	37th	25th	—	Bronze	4th	—
(Germany) 2023 Oberhof	40th	29th	14th	—	—	10th	—
(Czech Republic) 2024 Nové Město na Moravě	39th	21st	35th	—	5th	7th	—
(Switzerland) 2025 Lenzerheide	5th	18th	22nd	24th	11th	—	20th

=== World Cup ===
==== Individual podiums ====
Season	Place	Competition	Placement
2013–14	Hochfilzen, Austria	Pursuit	2nd
2017–18	Östersund, Sweden	Individual	3rd
2017–18	Östersund, Sweden	Sprint	3rd
2017–18	Oslo, Norway	Sprint	3rd
2018–19	Pokljuka, Slovenia	Individual	1st
2019–20	Östersund, Sweden	Individual	2nd
2020–21	Antholz, Italy	Individual	2nd
2020–21	Nové Město, Czech Republic	Sprint	2nd

==== Relay podiums ====
Season	Place	Competition	Placement
2012–13	Hochfilzen, Austria	Relay	2nd
2012–13	Oberhof, Germany	Relay	1st
2012–13	Sochi, Russia	Relay	2nd
2013–14	Hochfilzen, Austria	Relay	1st
2013–14	Annecy-Le Grand Bornand, France	Relay	2nd
2013–14	Ruhpolding, Germany	Relay	3rd
2014–15	Antholz, Italy	Relay	3rd
2014–15	Nové Město, Czech Republic	Single mixed relay	3rd
2015–16	Hochfilzen, Austria	Relay	3rd
2015–16	Ruhpolding, Germany	Relay	1st
2015–16	Presque Isle, United States	Relay	2nd
2016–17	Pokljuka, Slovenia	Relay	3rd
2017–18	Hochfilzen, Austria	Relay	2nd

==== Positions ====
Season	Individual	Sprint	Pursuit	Mass starts	Overall
2011–12	—	48	68	—	60
2012–13	21	20	38	36	30
2013–14	18	28	20	9	18
2014–15	15	34	21	31	24
2015–16	17	15	13	14	13
2016–17	8	13	9	4	8
2017–18	2	12	17	19	11
2018–19	7	50	60	38	37
2019–20	10	41	37	43	36
2020–21	4	16	20	26	17
2021–22	38	35	42	47	41
2022–23	33	37	33	39	38
2023–24	24	43	27	20	23
2024–25	17	32	13	22	25

=== Individual victories ===
No.	Season	Date	Location	Discipline	Level
1	2018/19	6 December 2018	Pokljuka, Slovenia	15 km Individual	World Cup

*Results are from IBU races which include the Biathlon World Cup, Biathlon World Championships and the Winter Olympic Games.

=== IBU Cup ===
==== Podiums ====
Season	Place	Competition	Placement
2011–12	Obertilliach, Austria	Sprint	2nd
