= Biathlon European Championships 2007 =

International biathlon competition

The 14th Biathlon European Championships were held in Bansko, Bulgaria from February 21 to February 25, 2007.

There were total of 16 competitions held: sprint, pursuit, individual and relay both for U26 and U21.

== Schedule of events ==
Biathlon European Championships 2007 official logo

The schedule of the event stands below. All times in CET.

Date	Event
February 21	U26 Men's 20 km individual
February 21	U26 Women's 15 km individual
February 21	U21 Men's 20 km individual
February 21	U21 Women's 15 km individual
February 22	U26 Men's 10 km sprint
February 22	U26 Women's 7.5 km sprint
February 22	U21 Men's 10 km sprint
February 22	U21 Women's 7.5 km sprint
February 24	U26 Men's 12.5 km pursuit
February 24	U26 Women's 10 km pursuit
February 24	U21 Men's 12.5 km pursuit
February 24	U21 Women's 10 km pursuit
February 25	U26 Men's 4*7.5 km relay
February 25	U26 Women's 4*6 km relay
February 25	U21 Men's 4*7.5 km relay
February 25	U21 Women's 3*6 km relay

== Results ==
=== U26 ===
==== Men's ====
Competition	1st	2nd	3rd
Men's 10 km sprint	(Poland) Tomasz Sikora	(Czech Republic) Jaroslav Soukup	(Austria) Tobias Eberhard
Men's 12.5 km pursuit	(Poland) Tomasz Sikora	(Latvia) Ilmārs Bricis	(Norway) Egil Gjelland
Men's 20 km individual	(Norway) Egil Gjelland	(Norway) Hans Martin Gjedrem	(Ukraine) Alexei Korobeynikov
Men's 4*7.5 km relay	(Germany) Germany; Daniel Graf; Christoph Knie; Carsten Pump; Jörn Wollschläger	(Norway) Norway; Alexander Os; Hans Martin Gjedrem; Magne Thorleiv Ronning; Egil Gjelland	(Belarus) Belarus; Sergey Novikov; Alexandr Syman; Rustam Valiullin; Vladimir Miklashevsky

==== Women's ====
Competition	1st	2nd	3rd
Women's 7.5 km sprint	(Belarus) Darya Domracheva	(Ukraine) Vita Semerenko	(Belarus) Olga Kudrashova
Women's 10 km pursuit	(Belarus) Olga Kudrashova	(Germany) Ute Niziak	(Bulgaria) Irina Nikulchina
Women's 15 km individual	(Ukraine) Oksana Yakovleva	(Belarus) Liudmila Ananko	(Poland) Magdalena Gwizdoń
Women's 4*6 km relay	(Belarus) Belarus; Nadezhda Skardino; Olga Kudrashova; Liudmila Ananko; Darya Domracheva	(Germany) Germany; Jenny Adler; Stephanie Müller; Ute Niziak; Sabrina Buchholz	(Ukraine) Ukraine; Oksana Yakovleva; Olena Petrova; Vita Semerenko; Valj Semerenko

=== U21 ===
==== Men's ====
Competition	1st	2nd	3rd
Men's 10 km sprint	(Austria) Dominik Landertinger	(Russia) Anton Shipulin	(Belarus) Igor Matlachov
Men's 12.5 km pursuit	(Austria) Dominik Landertinger	(Bulgaria) Krasimir Anev	(Russia) Anton Shipulin
Men's 20 km individual	(Bulgaria) Krasimir Anev	(Russia) Victor Vasilyev	(Norway) Henrik L'Abée-Lund
Men's 4*7.5 km relay	(Russia) Russia; Timur Abashev; Anton Shipulin; Dmitriy Blinov; Victor Vasilyev	(Austria) Austria; Sven Grossegger; Andreas Zelzer; Julian Eberhard; Dominik Landertinger	(Ukraine) Ukraine; Vitaliy Kozhushko; Vitaliy Kilchytskyy; Artem Pryma; Oleksandr Kolos

==== Women's ====
Competition	1st	2nd	3rd
Women's 7.5 km sprint	(Russia) Svetlana Sleptsova	(Austria) Iris Waldhuber	(Ukraine) Lyudmyla Zhyber
Women's 10 km pursuit	(Austria) Iris Waldhuber	(Russia) Svetlana Sleptsova	(Czech Republic) Veronika Vítková
Women's 15 km individual	(Russia) Ekaterina Shumilova	(Austria) Iris Waldhuber	(Russia) Svetlana Sleptsova
Women's 3*6 km relay	(Russia) Russia; Svetlana Sleptsova; Olga Vilukhina; Ekaterina Shumilova	(Ukraine) Ukraine; Lyudmyla Zhyber; Hanna Kulak; Olena Pidhrushna	(Bulgaria) Bulgaria; Silvia Georgieva; Ralica Galeva; Lilia Pandurova

== Medal table ==
No.	Country	Gold	Silver	Bronze	Total
1	Russia	4	3	2	9
2	Austria	3	3	1	7
3	Belarus	3	1	3	7
4	Poland	2		1	3
5	Ukraine	1	2	4	7
6	Norway	1	2	2	5
7	Germany	1	2		3
8	Bulgaria	1	1	2	4
9	Czech Republic		1	1	2
10	Latvia		1		1
