= Åsa Lif =

Swedish biathlete

Åsa Lif (born 26 July 1990) is a Swedish biathlete.

Lif lives in Östersund and represents Lima Biathlon. Her trainer is Roger Westling. In 2011, she became a member of the Swedish A squad; since 2012 she has been on the development squad. Her first international meet was the junior division of the World Championship Summer Biathlon 2007, in Otepää. In the cross-country running segments, she achieved 30th place in the sprint and 28th in the mass start; in roller skiing she came 20th in the sprint and 21st in pursuit. She competed at the junior level in the IBU Cup (formerly the European Cup) beginning with the 2007/08 season, and in 2009 competed for the first time in the Junior World Championships at Canmore, where she came in 34th in the sprint, 33rd in pursuit and individual, and with Ingela Andersson and Marielle Molander, 9th in the relay. The following year in Torsby she placed 40th in the individual, 30th in sprint, 33rd in pursuit and 12th in the relay. In 2011, competing in her third Junior World Championships at Nové Město na Moravě, she was 25th in individual, 34th in sprint, 41st in pursuit and 14th in the relay.

She competed in the IBU women's championships for the first time in 2008 at Idre, coming 64th in her first sprint and in her next, in the same venue, achieving 53rd, her best placement in the event. At the start of the 2012/13 season she made her first appearance in the World Cup, in Östersund, where she came 88th in her first sprint. In her next sprint, at Hochfilzen, she placed 61st, missing qualifying for the pursuit by only one position. In the relay, as last runner after Elisabeth Högberg, Anna-Karin Strömstedt and Elin Mattsson, she shared 9th place.

Between 2008 and 2010, Lif also competed in several international cross-country skiing events at the junior level and lower-level International Ski Federation events. On the national level, she won bronze with the Lima team at the 2010 Swedish Biathlon Championships, and gold in the roller ski sprint and silver in roller ski pursuit at the 2012 Summer Swedish Biathlon Championships in Sollefteå.

In April 2014, she was not included in the national squad, which she attributed to problems with a leg and a disc that would prevent her from fully following the training programme.
