= Daria Virolaynen =

Russian and Finnish biathlete

Daria Virolainen
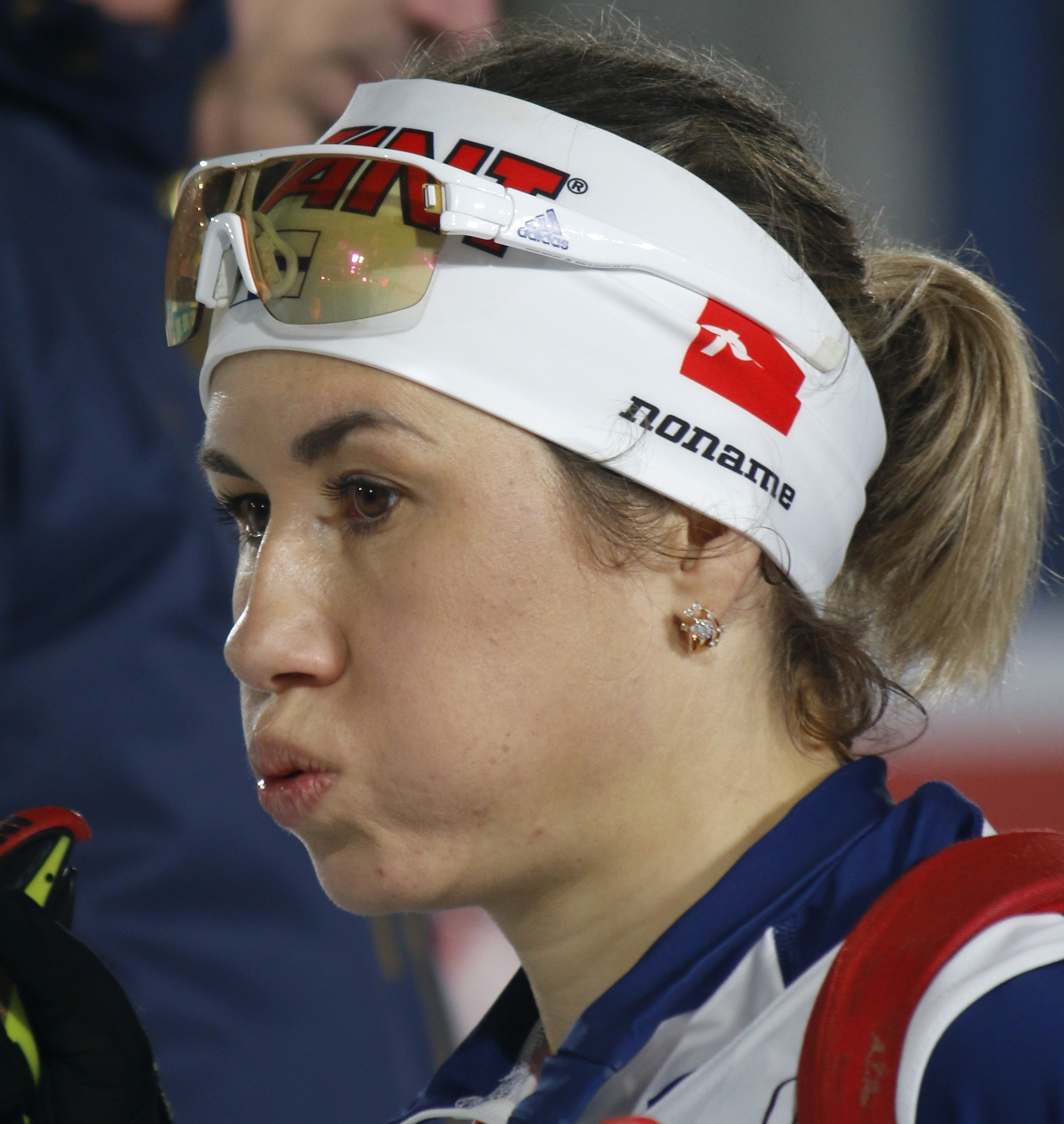
- Virolainen in 2024

Personal information
- Full name: Daria Leonidovna Virolaynen
- Citizenship: Finnish, Russian
- Born: Daria Leonidovna Reztsova; 24 January 1989 (age 37) Moscow, RSFSR, Soviet Union
- Height: 1.61 m (5 ft 3 in)
- Spouse: Roman Virolainen (m. 2007)

Sport

Professional information
- Sport: Biathlon
- World Cup debut: 6 March 2014

World Championships
- Teams: 1 (2015)
- Medals: 0

World Cup
- Seasons: 2 (2013/14–2023/24)
- Individual victories: 0
- All victories: 0
- Individual podiums: 2
- All podiums: 2
Medal record
Women's biathlon
Representing Russia
European Championships
Gold medal – first place	2017 Duszniki-Zdrój	single mixed relay
Bronze medal – third place	2014 Nové Město	10 km pursuit
Summer Junior World Championships
Gold medal – first place	2010 Duszniki-Zdrój	10 km pursuit
- Updated on 5 february 2026

Daria Leonidovna Virolaynen (née Reztsova; Russian: Дарья Леонидовна Виролайнен, Finnish: Darja Leonidovna Virolainen; born 24 January 1989) is a Russian and Finnish former biathlete.

== Career ==
Virolaynen was born in Moscow. Her mother was biathlete and cross country skier Anfisa Reztsova. Virolaynen debuted at the World Cup on 6 March 2014, when she got second place in the sprint event in Pokljuka. Earlier in the year Virolaynen had finished third in the pursuit competition at the European Championships. The following season, Virolaynen got her second podium, a second place in the pursuit in Antholz-Anterselva.

== Personal life ==
Virolaynen has three children with her husband, Roman Virolainen, a Russian cross-country skier of Ingrian Finnish descent who represented Belarus. The family moved to Finland in 2016, and she received Finnish citizenship in 2021. Their son, Daniel Virolainen, has competed in SM-hiihdot, the national cross-country skiing championships in Finland.
