= Biathlon European Championships 2013 =

International biathlon competition

The 20th Biathlon European Championships were held in Bansko, Bulgaria from 20 to 26 February 2013.

== Results ==
=== U26 ===
==== Men's ====
Event	Gold		Silver		Bronze	
20 km individual details	Serhiy Semenov; Ukraine	52:50.2 (0+0+0+1)	Tobias Arwidson; Sweden	53:04.5 (0+0+0+0)	Krasimir Anev; Bulgaria	53:09.3 (1+0+0+1)
10 km sprint details	Vetle Sjåstad Christiansen; Norway	25:34.4 (0+0)	Benedikt Doll; Germany	25:51.9 (1+0)	Artem Pryma; Ukraine	26:23.1 (1+0)
12.5 km pursuit details	Benedikt Doll; Germany	35:35.0 (1+0+2+0)	Vetle Sjåstad Christiansen; Norway	35:57.3 (0+1+1+1)	Timofey Lapshin; Russia	36:00.5 (1+0+0+1)
4 x 7.5 km relay	Cancelled					

==== Women's ====
Event	Gold		Silver		Bronze	
15 km individual details	Anastasia Zagoruiko; Russia	48:04.9 (0+0+0+0)	Ane Skrove Nossum; Norway	49:17.5 (1+0+0+0)	Monika Hojnisz; Poland	49:38.2 (0+0+1+1)
7.5 km sprint details	Irina Starykh; Russia	21:28.1 (0+0)	Yuliia Dzhima; Ukraine	21:28.5 (0+0)	Monika Hojnisz; Poland	21:33.7 (0+1)
10 km pursuit details	Monika Hojnisz; Poland	29:06.3 (0+0+0+0)	Franziska Preuß; Germany	30:49.5 (1+0+1+0)	Karolin Horchler; Germany	31:27.6 (0+0+0+0)
4 x 6 km relay details	Germany; Nicole Wötzel; Vanessa Hinz; Franziska Preuß; Karolin Horchler	1:11:12.7 (0+0) (0+1) (0+1) (0+2) (0+0) (0+3) (0+2) (0+1)	Czech Republic; Jitka Landová; Lea Johanidesová; Eva Puskarčíková; Veronika Zvařičová	1:11:36.7 (0+1) (0+3) (0+0) (0+0) (0+0) (0+3) (0+1) (0+1)	Ukraine; Yuliia Dzhima; Iana Bondar; Iryna Varvynets; Mariya Panfilova	1:11:39.8 (0+1) (0+2) (3+3) (0+1) (0+0) (0+0) (1+3) (0+1)

=== U21 ===
==== Men's ====
Event	Gold		Silver		Bronze	
15 km individual details	Alexander Loginov; Russia	42:57.9 (0+0+0+1)	Maxim Tsvetkov; Russia	45:07.7 (0+0+0+2)	Benjamin Plaickner; Italy	46:59.2 (0+0+1+0)
10 km sprint details	Alexander Loginov; Russia	25:56.1 (0+1)	Maxim Tsvetkov; Russia	26:16.1 (0+1)	Timur Makhambetov; Russia	26:57.2 (1+0)
12.5 km pursuit details	Alexander Loginov; Russia	30:59.0 (0+0+0+1)	Maxim Tsvetkov; Russia	33:29.8 (1+0+1+2)	Mathieu Legrand; France	34:07.7 (0+1+0+1)

==== Women's ====
Event	Gold		Silver		Bronze	
12.5 km individual details	Anaïs Chevalier; France	43:05.1 (0+0+0+1)	Elena Ankudinova; Russia	44:00.8 (0+2+0+0)	Lisa Hauser; Austria	44:22.9 (1+0+1+0)
7.5 km sprint details	Uliana Kaisheva; Russia	25:04.6 (0+1)	Lisa Hauser; Austria	25:18.7 (0+0)	Floriane Parisse; France	25:36.6 (0+0)
10 km pursuit details	Patricia Jost; Switzerland	31:58.3 (1+0+0+1)	Lisa Hauser; Austria	33:04.0 (4+2+0+0)	Anaïs Chevalier; France	33:35.1 (0+0+0+0)

==== Mixed ====
Event	Gold		Silver		Bronze	
2 x 6 + 2 x 7.5 km relay details	France; Anaïs Chevalier; Floriane Parisse; Mathieu Legrand; Quentin Fillon Maillet	1:15:40.4 (0+1) (0+3) (0+0) (1+3) (0+0) (0+1) (0+0) (0+2)	Russia; Elena Badanina; Elena Ankudinova; Alexander Chernyshov; Timur Makhambetov	1:15:40.5 (0+0) (0+0) (0+1) (0+1) (0+2) (0+0) (0+0) (0+2)	Ukraine; Yuliya Zhuravok; Alla Gylenko; Ruslan Tkalenko; Artem Tyshchenko	1:17:25.5 (0+2) (0+0) (0+1) (0+2) (0+0) (0+2) (0+0) (0+1)

== Medal table ==
=== U26 ===
* Host nation (Bulgaria)

Rank	Nation	Gold	Silver	Bronze	Total
1	Germany	2	2	1	5
2	Russia	2	0	1	3
3	Norway	1	2	0	3
4	Ukraine	1	1	2	4
5	Poland	1	0	2	3
6	Czech Republic	0	1	0	1
6	Sweden	0	1	0	1
8	Bulgaria*	0	0	1	1
Totals (8 entries)		7	7	7	21

=== U21 ===
Rank	Nation	Gold	Silver	Bronze	Total
1	Russia	4	5	1	10
2	France	2	0	3	5
3	Switzerland	1	0	0	1
4	Austria	0	2	1	3
5	Italy	0	0	1	1
5	Ukraine	0	0	1	1
Totals (6 entries)		7	7	7	21

=== Total ===
* Host nation (Bulgaria)

Rank	Nation	Gold	Silver	Bronze	Total
1	Russia	6	5	2	13
2	Germany	2	2	1	5
3	France	2	0	3	5
4	Norway	1	2	0	3
5	Ukraine	1	1	3	5
6	Poland	1	0	2	3
7	Switzerland	1	0	0	1
8	Austria	0	2	1	3
9	Czech Republic	0	1	0	1
9	Sweden	0	1	0	1
11	Bulgaria*	0	0	1	1
11	Italy	0	0	1	1
Totals (12 entries)		14	14	14	42
