= Mariya Panfilova =

Russian biathlete (born 1987)

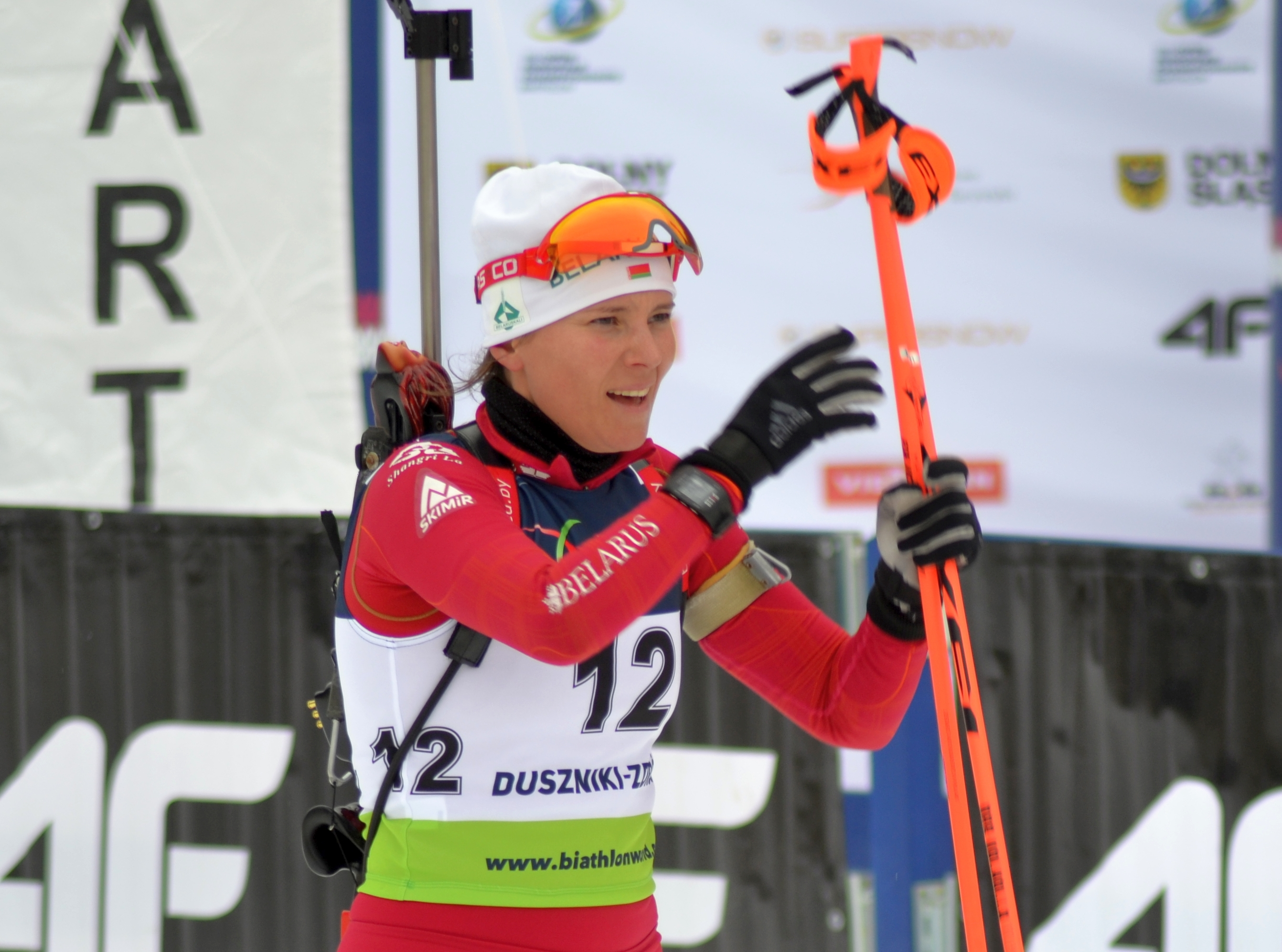

Personal information
- Born: 11 October 1987 (age 38) Perm, Russian SFSR
- Height: 1.70 m (5 ft 7 in)

Sport
- Sport: Skiing

World Cup career
- Seasons: 2007–2012 (for Russia); 2013–2014 (for Ukraine); 2015–2017 (for Belarus); 2017–2018 (for Ukraine)
- Indiv. podiums: 1
- Indiv. wins: 0
Medal record
Women's biathlon
Representing Russia
European Championships
Gold medal – first place	2008 Nové Město	Junior relay
Silver medal – second place	2009 Ufa	Relay
Bronze medal – third place	2008 Nové Město	Junior pursuit
Representing Ukraine
European Championships
Bronze medal – third place	2013 Bansko	Relay
- Updated on December 19, 2015

Mariya Panfilova (née Mariya Sadilova) (born October 11, 1987) is a retired biathlete, represented Russia (2007–2012), Ukraine (2013–2014, 2017–2018), and Belarus (2015–2017).

== Performances ==
Level	Year	Event	IN	SP	PU	MS	RL	MRL
EBCH	2008 (Rus)	Nové Město na Moravě, Czech Republic		15	3		1	
EBCH	2009 (Rus)	Ufa, Russia	6				2	
EBCH	2013 (Ukr)	Bansko, Bulgaria		4	5		3	
OLY	2014 (Ukr)	Sochi, Russia						7

(Rus) – representing Russia; (Ukr) – representing Ukraine

=== World Cup ===
==== Podiums ====
Season	Place	Competition	Placement
2012–13 (Ukr)	Sochi, Russia	Relay	2

==== Positions ====
Season	Individual	Sprint	Pursuit	Mass starts	TOTAL
2012–13 (Ukr)	31	54	61	42	47
2013–14 (Ukr)		54			63
