= Inna Suprun =

Ukrainian biathlete (born 1983)

Personal information
- Full name: Inna Suprun
- Born: 10 April 1983 (age 43) Konotop, Ukraine
- Height: 1.64 m (5 ft 5 in)
- Weight: 56 kg (123 lb)

Sport
- Sport: Skiing

World Cup career
- Seasons: 2003–
Medal record
Women's biathlon
Representing Ukraine
European Championships
| Gold medal – first place | 2009 Ufa | Women's relay |
Winter Universiade
| Gold medal – first place | 2005 Innsbruck | Relay |
- Updated on December 1, 2013

Inna Suprun (born 10 April 1983) is a Ukrainian World Cup level biathlete.

== Performances ==
| Level | Year | Event | IN | SP | PU | MS | RL | MRL |
|---|---|---|---|---|---|---|---|---|
| JBWCH | 2004 | Maurienne, France | 21 | 29 | 29 | | 8 | |
| EBCH | 2004 | Minsk, Belarus | 20 | 19 | 14 | | 5 | |
| EBCH | 2008 | Nové Město na Moravě, Czech Republic | 5 | 17 | DNS | | | |
| EBCH | 2009 | Ufa, Russia | | 10 | 14 | | 1 | |
| BWCH | 2011 | Khanty-Mansiysk, Russia | | 22 | 20 | 27 | | |

=== World Cup ===
==== Positions ====
| Season | Individual | Sprint | Pursuit | Mass starts | TOTAL |
|---|---|---|---|---|---|
| 2010–11 | 59 | 42 | 29 | 37 | 37 |
