= Elise Ringen =

Norwegian biathlete (born 1989)

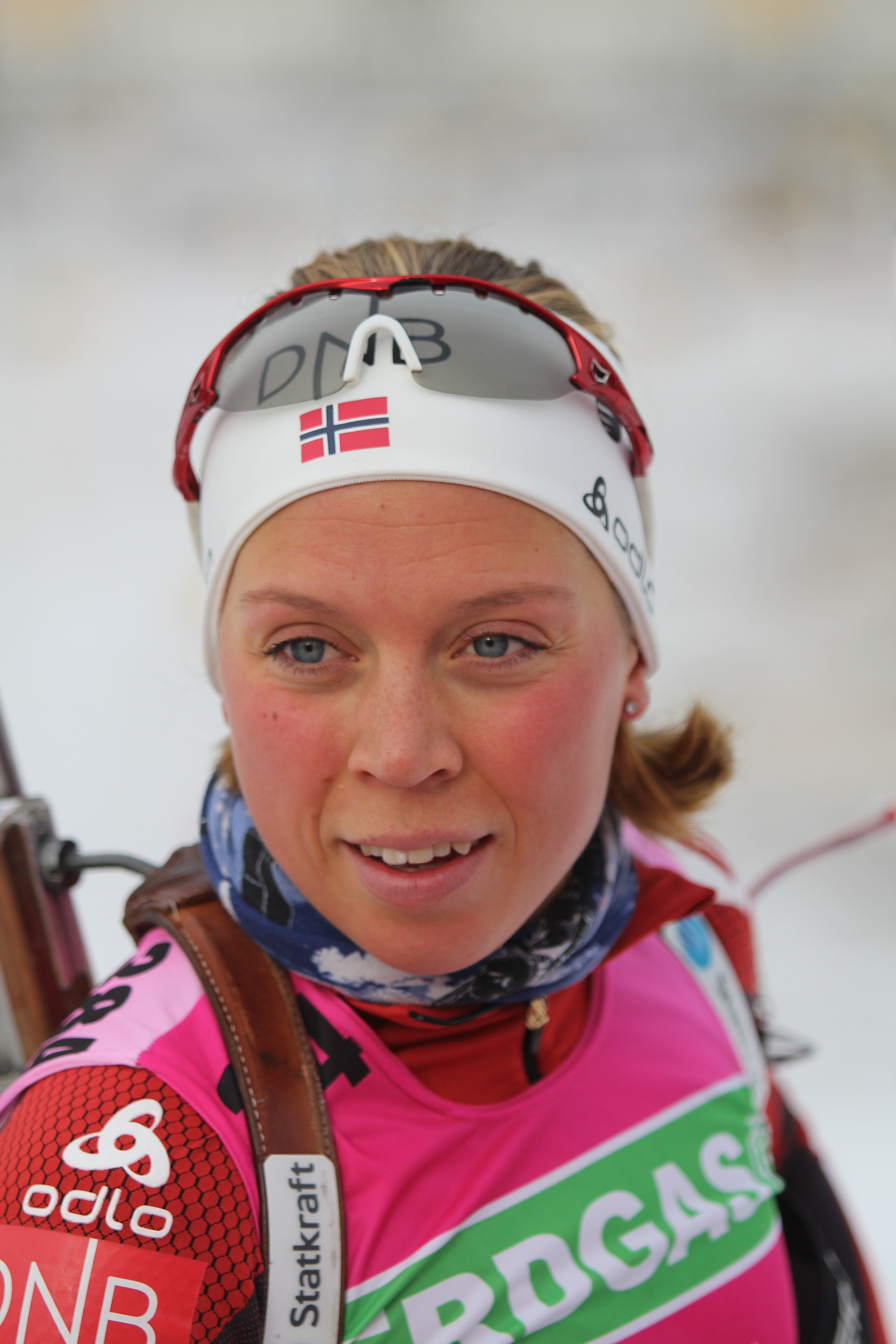
- Ringen in 2011

Personal information
- Full name: Elise Ringen
- Born: 21 November 1989 (age 36) Meråker Municipality, Nord-Trøndelag, Norway
- Height: 1.69 m (5 ft 7 in)

Sport

Professional information
- Sport: Biathlon
- Club: Meråker skiskytterklubb
- World Cup debut: 13 March 2008
- Retired: 31 March 2016

Olympic Games
- Teams: 1 (2014)
- Medals: 0

World Championships
- Teams: 2 (2012, 2015)
- Medals: 1

World Cup
- Seasons: 6 (2007/08–2008/09; 2011/12–2014/15)
- Individual victories: 0
- All victories: 1
- Individual podiums: 0
- All podiums: 3
Medal record
Women's biathlon
Representing Norway
World Championships
Bronze medal – third place	2012 Ruhpolding	4 × 6 km relay
Youth World Championships
Silver medal – second place	2008 Ruhpolding	6 km sprint
Silver medal – second place	2008 Ruhpolding	3 × 6 km relay
Bronze medal – third place	2008 Ruhpolding	7.5 km pursuit
Junior European Championships
Gold medal – first place	2008 Nové Město	12.5 km individual
Bronze medal – third place	2008 Nové Město	4 × 6 km relay

Elise Ringen (born 21 November 1989) is a Norwegian former biathlete.

Her greatest achievements include a bronze medal in the relay at the 2012 World Championships, and a World Cup victory in the relay in Hochfilzen during the 2011–12 season.

Ringen retired after the 2015–16 season.

== Biathlon results ==
All results are sourced from the International Biathlon Union.

=== Olympic Games ===
Event	Individual	Sprint	Pursuit	Mass start	Relay	Mixed relay
(Russia) 2014 Sochi	24th	—	—	—	—	—

=== World Championships ===
1 medal (1 bronze)

Event	Individual	Sprint	Pursuit	Mass start	Relay	Mixed relay
(Germany) 2012 Ruhpolding	71st	14th	21st	22nd	Bronze	—
(Finland) 2015 Kontiolahti	32nd	54th	38th	—	—	—

*During Olympic seasons competitions are only held for those events not included in the Olympic program.
