= Irina Starykh =

Russian biathlete (born 1987)

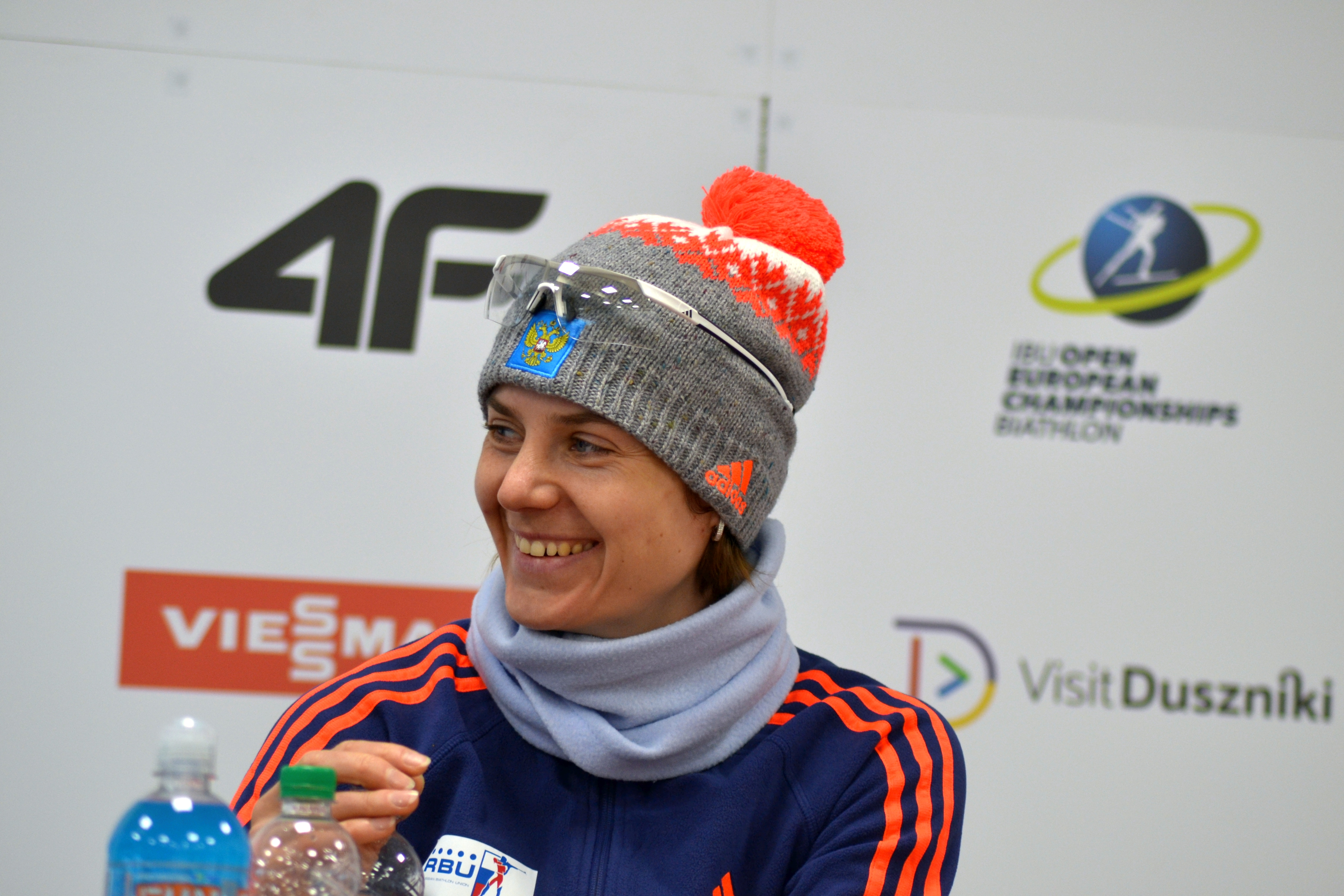
- Open European Championships Biathlon 2017, Individual Women's race, held on January 25th.

Personal information
- Born: 26 August 1987 (age 38) Kurgan, Kurgan Oblast, Russian SFSR, Soviet Union

Sport

Professional information
- World Cup debut: 1 March 2013

World Championships
- Teams: 2 (2017, 2019)

World Cup
- Seasons: 5 (2012/13, 2013/14, 2016/17 –)
- Individual podiums: 2
Medal record
Women's biathlon
Representing Russia
Youth World Championships
Silver medal – second place	2006 Presque Isle	10 km individual
Silver medal – second place	2006 Presque Isle	6 km sprint
Silver medal – second place	2006 Presque Isle	3 × 6 km relay
Bronze medal – third place	2005 Kontiolahti	3 × 6 km relay
European Championships
Gold medal – first place	2013 Bansko	Sprint
Gold medal – first place	2017 Duszniki-Zdrój	Individual
Gold medal – first place	2017 Duszniki-Zdrój	Pursuit
Gold medal – first place	2017 Duszniki-Zdrój	Mixed relay
Bronze medal – third place	2017 Duszniki-Zdrój	Sprint
Winter Universiade
Gold medal – first place	2009 Harbin	Mixed relay

Irina Aleksandrovna Starykh (Russian: Ирина Александровна Старых; born 26 August 1987) is a Russian biathlete.

== Career ==
She won the gold medal in the sprint competition at the 2013 European Championships.

Starykh was seen as a medal hope for Russia at the 2014 Winter Olympics in Sochi but was withdrawn from the team after she failed a doping test.

She was disqualified for doping for three years since 23 December 2013.

== Biathlon results ==
All results are sourced from the International Biathlon Union.

=== World Championships ===
Event	Individual	Sprint	Pursuit	Mass start	Relay	Mixed relay	Single mixed relay
(Austria) 2017 Hochfilzen	42nd	24th	4th	15th	10th	—	—N/a
(Sweden) 2019 Östersund	—	44th	45th	—	—	—	—

*During Olympic seasons competitions are only held for those events not included in the Olympic program.
**The single mixed relay was added as an event in 2019.
