= Marine Bolliet =

French biathlete (born 1988)

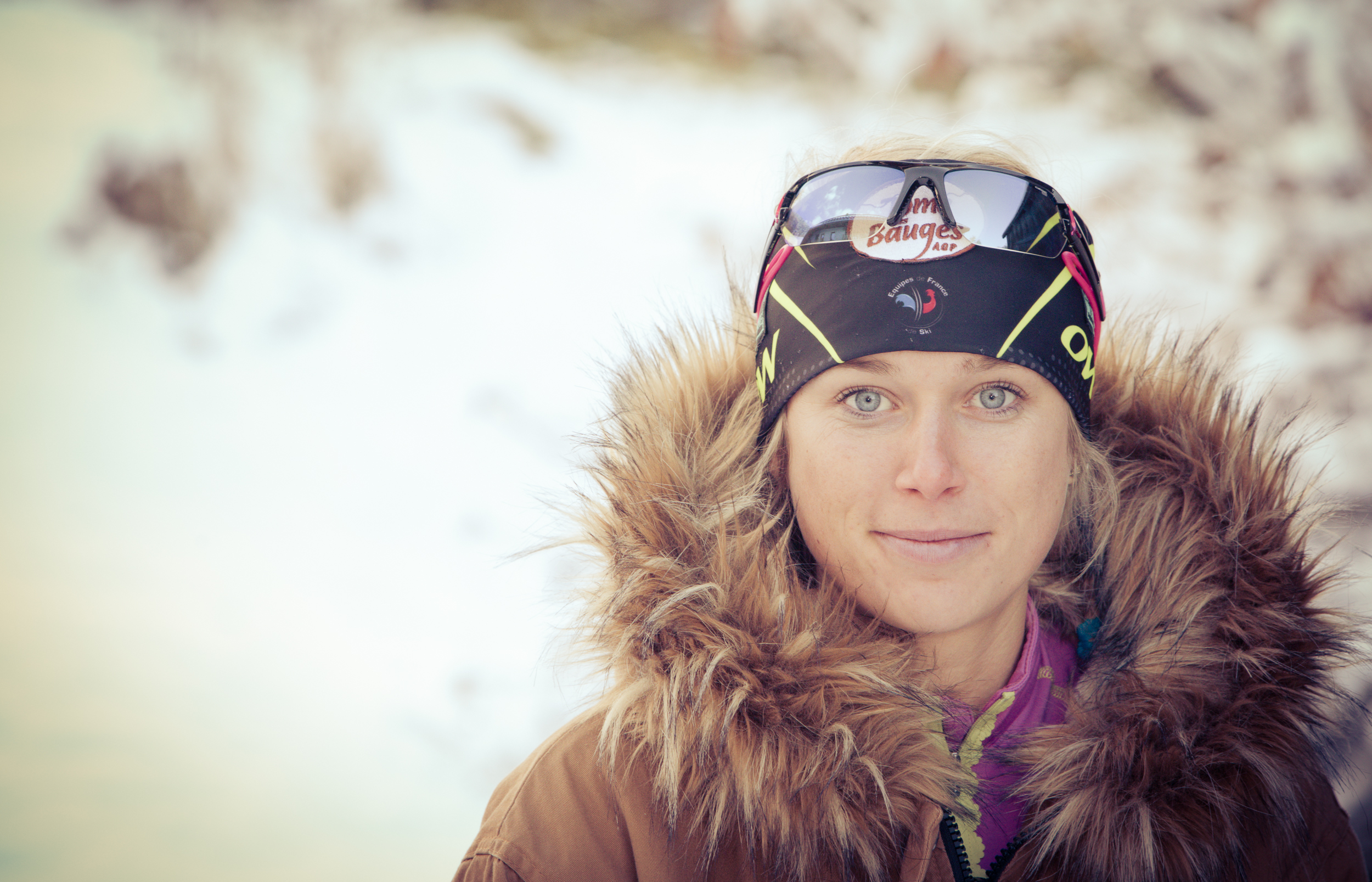
- Marine Bollier, January 2014

Personal information
- Nationality: French
- Born: 14 January 1988 (age 38)

Sport
- Sport: Biathlon
Medal record
Youth World Championships
Gold medal – first place	2007 Martell	3 × 6 km relay
Bronze medal – third place	2006 Presque Isle	3 × 6 km relay

Marine Bolliet (born 14 January 1988) is a former French biathlete. She competed at the Biathlon World Cup in 2010-11, 2011-12, 2012-13, 2013-14, and at the 2014 Winter Olympics in Sochi.
