= 2017–18 Biathlon IBU Cup =

2018–19 Biathlon IBU Cup
Discipline	Men	Women
Overall	(Norway) Vetle Sjåstad Christiansen	(Germany) Karolin Horchler
Nations Cup	Norway	Russia
Individual	(France) Fabien Claude	(Germany) Nadine Horchler
Sprint	(Norway) Vetle Sjåstad Christiansen	(Germany) Karolin Horchler
Pursuit	(Russia) Alexandr Loginov	(France) Chloé Chevalier
- Mixed: France

Competition

The 2017–18 Biathlon IBU Cup was a multi-race tournament over a season of biathlon, organised by the International Biathlon Union. IBU Cup is the second-rank competition in biathlon after the Biathlon World Cup. The season started on 22 November 2017 in Sjusjøen, Norway and ended on 17 March 2018 in Khanty-Mansiysk, Russia. The defending overall champions from the 2016–17 Biathlon IBU Cup were Alexey Volkov of Russia and Daria Virolaynen of Russia.

== Calendar ==
Below is the IBU Cup calendar for the 2017–18 season.

Stage	Location	Date	Individual	Sprint	Pursuit	Mixed relay	Single mixed relay	Super sprint	Details
1	(Norway) Sjusjøen	22 November–26 November		● ●		●	●		details
2	(Switzerland) Lenzerheide	7–10 December		●	●	●	●		details
3	(Austria) Obertilliach	13–17 December	●	●		●	●		details
4	(Slovakia) Brezno-Osrblie	5–7 January		● ●					details
5	(Germany) Arber	10–13 January	●	●					details
EC	(Italy) Ridnaun-Val Ridanna	23–28 January	●	●	●	●	●		European Championships
6	(Italy) Martell-Val Martello	1–3 February		●	●				details
7	(Russia) Uvat	9–11 March	●	●					details
8	(Russia) Khanty-Mansiysk	13–17 March		●	●			●	details
Total: 48 (20 men's, 20 women's, 8 mixed)			4	11	4	4	4	1	

Notes

- All European Championships races included in the IBU Cup total score.
- Super sprint races were included in the sprint total score.

== IBU Cup podiums ==
=== Men ===
Stage	Date	Place	Discipline	Winner	Second	Third	Yellow bib (After competition)	Res.
1	23 November 2017	(Norway) Sjusjøen	10 km Sprint	(France) Émilien Jacquelin	(Germany) Johannes Kühn	(Russia) Alexey Slepov	(France) Émilien Jacquelin	Results
1	25 November 2017	(Norway) Sjusjøen	10 km Sprint	(Norway) Tarjei Bø	(Norway) Fredrik Gjesbakk	(Russia) Eduard Latypov	(Norway) Fredrik Gjesbakk	Results
2	9 December 2017	(Switzerland) Lenzerheide	10 km Sprint	(France) Antonin Guigonnat	(Norway) Vegard Gjermundshaug	(Norway) Fredrik Gjesbakk	(Norway) Fredrik Gjesbakk	Results
2	10 December 2017	(Switzerland) Lenzerheide	12.5 km Pursuit	(France) Antonin Guigonnat	(Norway) Fredrik Gjesbakk	(Russia) Alexey Slepov	(Norway) Fredrik Gjesbakk	Results
3	14 December 2017	(Austria) Obertilliach	20 km Individual	(Norway) Vetle Sjåstad Christiansen	(Belgium) Michael Rösch	(Ukraine) Volodymyr Siemakov	(Norway) Vetle Sjåstad Christiansen	Results
3	16 December 2017	(Austria) Obertilliach	10 km Sprint	(Russia) Dmitry Malyshko	(Russia) Eduard Latypov	(France) Émilien Jacquelin	(Norway) Vetle Sjåstad Christiansen	Results
4	6 January 2018	(Slovakia) Brezno-Osrblie	10 km Sprint	(France) Simon Fourcade	(Norway) Fredrik Gjesbakk	(Norway) Vegard Gjermundshaug	(Norway) Vetle Sjåstad Christiansen	Results
4	7 January 2018	(Slovakia) Brezno-Osrblie	10 km Sprint	(Norway) Vegard Gjermundshaug	(France) Simon Fourcade	(Germany) Florian Graf	(Norway) Fredrik Gjesbakk	Results
5	11 January 2018	(Germany) Arber	20 km Individual	(France) Jean-Guillaume Beatrix	(Russia) Petr Pashchenko	(Belarus) Vladimir Chepelin	(Norway) Fredrik Gjesbakk	Results
5	13 January 2018	(Germany) Arber	10 km Sprint	(Norway) Vetle Sjåstad Christiansen	(France) Émilien Jacquelin	(Norway) Fredrik Gjesbakk	(Norway) Fredrik Gjesbakk	Results
EC	24 January 2018	(Italy) Ridnaun-Val Ridanna	20 km Individual	(Austria) Felix Leitner	(Czech Republic) Tomáš Krupčík	(Germany) Philipp Horn	(Norway) Vetle Sjåstad Christiansen	Results
EC	26 January 2018	(Italy) Ridnaun-Val Ridanna	10 km Sprint	(Latvia) Andrejs Rastorgujevs	(Russia) Alexandr Loginov	(Bulgaria) Krasimir Anev	(Norway) Vetle Sjåstad Christiansen	Results
EC	27 January 2018	(Italy) Ridnaun-Val Ridanna	12.5 km Pursuit	(Russia) Alexandr Loginov	(Bulgaria) Krasimir Anev	(Russia) Evgeniy Garanichev	(Norway) Vetle Sjåstad Christiansen	Results
6	2 February 2018	(Italy) Martell-Val Martello	10 km Sprint	(Russia) Alexandr Loginov	(Norway) Fredrik Gjesbakk	(France) Simon Fourcade	(Norway) Fredrik Gjesbakk	Results
6	3 February 2018	(Italy) Martell-Val Martello	12.5 km Pursuit	(Russia) Alexandr Loginov	(Russia) Dmitry Malyshko	(Norway) Håvard Bogetveit	(Norway) Vetle Sjåstad Christiansen	Results
7	10 March 2018	(Russia) Uvat	20 km Individual	(France) Fabien Claude	(Norway) Vetle Sjåstad Christiansen	(Russia) Alexandr Loginov	(Norway) Vetle Sjåstad Christiansen	Results
7	11 March 2018	(Russia) Uvat	10 km Sprint	(Russia) Alexandr Loginov	(Russia) Alexey Slepov	(Germany) Philipp Nawrath	(Norway) Vetle Sjåstad Christiansen	Results
8	14 March 2018	(Russia) Khanty-Mansiysk	Super Sprint	(Norway) Vetle Sjåstad Christiansen	(Austria) Lorenz Wäger	(Russia) Vasily Tomshin	(Norway) Vetle Sjåstad Christiansen	Results
8	16 March 2018	(Russia) Khanty-Mansiysk	10 km Sprint	(Russia) Alexey Slepov	(Russia) Alexandr Loginov	(Norway) Vetle Sjåstad Christiansen	(Norway) Vetle Sjåstad Christiansen	Results
8	17 March 2018	(Russia) Khanty-Mansiysk	12.5 km Pursuit	(Russia) Alexandr Loginov	(Russia) Alexey Slepov	(Germany) Florian Graf	(Norway) Vetle Sjåstad Christiansen	Results

=== Women ===
Stage	Date	Place	Discipline	Winner	Second	Third	Yellow bib (After competition)	Res.
1	23 November 2017	(Norway) Sjusjøen	7.5 km Sprint	(Russia) Uliana Kaisheva	(Norway) Thekla Brun-Lie	(Russia) Olga Iakushova	(Russia) Uliana Kaisheva	Results
1	25 November 2017	(Norway) Sjusjøen	7.5 km Sprint	(Germany) Denise Herrmann	(Austria) Katharina Innerhofer	(Norway) Thekla Brun-Lie	(Norway) Thekla Brun-Lie	Results
2	9 December 2017	(Switzerland) Lenzerheide	7.5 km Sprint	(Russia) Uliana Kaisheva	(Ukraine) Olga Abramova	(Ukraine) Yuliya Zhuravok	(Russia) Uliana Kaisheva	Results
2	10 December 2017	(Switzerland) Lenzerheide	10 km Pursuit	(Russia) Uliana Kaisheva	(Russia) Daria Virolaynen	(France) Chloé Chevalier	(Russia) Uliana Kaisheva	Results
3	14 December 2017	(Austria) Obertilliach	15 km Individual	(Poland) Monika Hojnisz	(Germany) Karolin Horchler	(Switzerland) Elisa Gasparin	(Russia) Uliana Kaisheva	Results
3	16 December 2017	(Austria) Obertilliach	7.5 km Sprint	(Germany) Karolin Horchler	(France) Julia Simon	(Russia) Uliana Kaisheva	(Russia) Uliana Kaisheva	Results
4	6 January 2018	(Slovakia) Brezno-Osrblie	7.5 km Sprint	(Russia) Uliana Kaisheva	(France) Chloé Chevalier	(Norway) Kaia Wøien Nicolaisen	(Russia) Uliana Kaisheva	Results
4	7 January 2018	(Slovakia) Brezno-Osrblie	7.5 km Sprint	(Russia) Uliana Kaisheva	(Russia) Irina Uslugina	(Germany) Karolin Horchler	(Russia) Uliana Kaisheva	Results
5	11 January 2018	(Germany) Arber	15 km Individual	(Germany) Karolin Horchler	(Norway) Thekla Brun-Lie	(Germany) Anna Weidel	(Russia) Uliana Kaisheva	Results
5	13 January 2018	(Germany) Arber	10 km Sprint	(Norway) Hilde Fenne	(Russia) Valeriia Vasnetcova	(Russia) Kristina Reztsova	(Russia) Uliana Kaisheva	Results
EC	24 January 2018	(Italy) Ridnaun-Val Ridanna	15 km Individual	(France) Chloé Chevalier	(Italy) Alexia Runggaldier	(Russia) Victoria Slivko	(Russia) Uliana Kaisheva	Results
EC	26 January 2018	(Italy) Ridnaun-Val Ridanna	7.5 km Sprint	(Ukraine) Iryna Varvynets	(France) Chloé Chevalier	(Japan) Fuyuko Tachizaki	(Russia) Uliana Kaisheva	Results
EC	27 January 2018	(Italy) Ridnaun-Val Ridanna	10 km Pursuit	(France) Chloé Chevalier	(Ukraine) Iryna Varvynets	(France) Julia Simon	(Russia) Uliana Kaisheva	Results
6	2 February 2018	(Italy) Martell-Val Martello	7.5 km Sprint	(Russia) Victoria Slivko	(Russia) Anastasia Zagoruiko	(France) Enora Latuillière	(Germany) Nadine Horchler	Results
6	3 February 2018	(Italy) Martell-Val Martello	10 km Pursuit	(Russia) Anastasia Zagoruiko	(France) Chloé Chevalier	(Germany) Karolin Horchler	(Germany) Karolin Horchler	Results
7	10 March 2018	(Russia) Uvat	15 km Individual	(Russia) Irina Uslugina	(Ukraine) Yuliya Zhuravok	(Russia) Evgeniya Pavlova	(Germany) Karolin Horchler	Results
7	11 March 2018	(Russia) Uvat	7.5 km Sprint	(Russia) Evgeniya Pavlova	(Germany) Karolin Horchler	(Ukraine) Yuliya Zhuravok	(Germany) Karolin Horchler	Results
8	14 March 2018	(Russia) Khanty-Mansiysk	Super Sprint	(Germany) Karolin Horchler	(Germany) Nadine Horchler	(Russia) Tamara Voronina	(Germany) Karolin Horchler	Results
8	16 March 2018	(Russia) Khanty-Mansiysk	7.5 km Sprint	(Austria) Julia Schwaiger	(Russia) Anastasia Egorova	(Russia) Irina Uslugina	(Germany) Karolin Horchler	Results
8	17 March 2018	(Russia) Khanty-Mansiysk	10 km Pursuit	(Russia) Irina Uslugina	(Russia) Anastasia Egorova	(Germany) Karolin Horchler	(Germany) Karolin Horchler	Results

=== Mixed ===
Stage	Date	Place	Discipline	Winner	Second	Third	Res.
1	26 November 2017	(Norway) Sjusjøen	1x6 km + 1x7.5 km Single Mixed Relay	France Julia Simon; Antonin Guigonnat	Sweden Elisabeth Högberg; Tobias Arwidson	Austria Katharina Innerhofer; David Komatz	Results
1	26 November 2017	(Norway) Sjusjøen	2x6 km + 2x7.5 km Mixed Relay	Russia Uliana Kaisheva; Irina Uslugina; Alexander Povarnitsyn; Alexey Slepov	France Coline Varcin; Chloé Chevalier; Clement Dumont; Fabien Claude	Germany Nadine Horchler; Marie Heinrich; Michael Willeitner; David Zobel	Results
2	8 December 2017	(Switzerland) Lenzerheide	1x6 km + 1x7.5 km Single Mixed Relay	Norway Thekla Brun-Lie; Vetle Sjåstad Christiansen	France Julia Simon; Antonin Guigonnat	Russia Kristina Reztsova; Alexey Volkov	Results
2	8 December 2017	(Switzerland) Lenzerheide	2x6 km + 2x7.5 km Mixed Relay	France Enora Latuillière; Chloé Chevalier; Clement Dumont; Fabien Claude	Russia Irina Uslugina; Valeriia Vasnetcova; Petr Pashchenko; Alexander Povarnitsyn	Germany Nadine Horchler; Luise Kummer; Michael Willeitner; Florian Graf	Results
3	17 December 2017	(Austria) Obertilliach	1x6 km + 1x7.5 km Single Mixed Relay	Russia Kristina Reztsova; Alexey Volkov	France Julia Simon; Émilien Jacquelin	Ukraine Yuliya Zhuravok; Artem Pryma	Results
3	17 December 2017	(Austria) Obertilliach	2x6 km + 2x7.5 km Mixed Relay	Norway Emilie Aagheim Kalkenberg; Karoline Offigstad Knotten; Vetle Sjåstad Christiansen; Vegard Gjermundshaug	Germany Nadine Horchler; Karolin Horchler; David Zobel; Roman Rees	France Coline Varcin; Myrtille Begue; Clement Dumont; Aristide Begue	Results
EC	28 January 2018	(Italy) Ridnaun-Val Ridanna	1x6 km + 1x7.5 km Single Mixed Relay	Norway Thekla Brun-Lie; Vetle Sjåstad Christiansen	France Julia Simon; Émilien Jacquelin	United States Susan Dunklee; Lowell Bailey	Results
EC	28 January 2018	(Italy) Ridnaun-Val Ridanna	2x6 km + 2x7.5 km Mixed Relay	Ukraine Yuliya Zhuravok; Iryna Varvynets; Artem Pryma; Dmytro Pidruchnyi	Russia Victoria Slivko; Anastasia Zagoruiko; Evgeniy Garanichev; Alexandr Loginov	Norway Emilie Aagheim Kalkenberg; Kaia Wøien Nicolaisen; Håvard Gutubø Bogetveit; Fredrik Gjesbakk	Results

== Standings (men) ==
=== Overall ===
Pos.		Points
1.	(Norway) Vetle Sjåstad Christiansen	721
2.	(Norway) Fredrik Gjesbakk	587
3.	(Russia) Petr Pashchenko	571
4.	(France) Fabien Claude	540
5.	(Norway) Vegard Gjermundshaug	530

- Final standings after 20 races.

=== Individual ===
Pos.		Points
1.	(France) Fabien Claude	160
2.	(Norway) Vetle Sjåstad Christiansen	139
3.	(Germany) Florian Graf	116
4.	(Russia) Petr Pashchenko	114
5.	(Czech Republic) Tomáš Krupčík	103

- Final standings after 4 races.

=== Sprint ===
Pos.		Points
1.	(Norway) Vetle Sjåstad Christiansen	423
2.	(Norway) Fredrik Gjesbakk	386
3.	(Russia) Petr Pashchenko	363
4.	(Norway) Vegard Gjermundshaug	348
5.	(Russia) Alexey Slepov	297

- Final standings after 12 races.

=== Pursuit ===
Pos.		Points
1.	(Russia) Alexandr Loginov	180
2.	(Norway) Vetle Sjåstad Christiansen	159
3.	(Norway) Fredrik Gjesbakk	154
4.	(Russia) Alexey Volkov	114
5.	(Russia) Petr Pashchenko	111

- Final standings after 4 races.

=== Mixed relay ===
Pos.		Points
1.	France	427
2.	Russia	394
3.	Norway	349
4.	Sweden	318
5.	Ukraine	312

- Final standings after 8 races.

=== Nation ===
Pos.		Points
1.	Norway	7582
2.	Russia	7511
3.	France	6934
4.	Germany	6789
5.	Czech Republic	6408

- Final standings after 24 races.

== Standings (women) ==
=== Overall ===
Pos.		Points
1.	(Germany) Karolin Horchler	675
2.	(France) Chloé Chevalier	613
3.	(Germany) Nadine Horchler	604
4.	(Russia) Irina Uslugina	490
5.	(France) Enora Latuillière	458

- Final standings after 20 races.

=== Individual ===
Pos.		Points
1.	(Germany) Nadine Horchler	135
2.	(Ukraine) Yuliya Zhuravok	131
3.	(Germany) Karolin Horchler	128
4.	(Norway) Karoline Offigstad Knotten	98
5.	(Italy) Alexia Runggaldier	94

- Final standings after 4 races.

=== Sprint ===
Pos.		Points
1.	(Germany) Karolin Horchler	424
2.	(Germany) Nadine Horchler	384
3.	(France) Chloé Chevalier	337
4.	(Russia) Irina Uslugina	322
5.	(Russia) Uliana Kaisheva	315

- Final standings after 12 races.

=== Pursuit ===
Pos.		Points
1.	(France) Chloé Chevalier	191
2.	(Germany) Karolin Horchler	123
3.	(Russia) Anastasia Zagoruiko	122
4.	(Germany) Nadine Horchler	117
5.	(Russia) Irina Uslugina	108

- Final standings after 4 races.

=== Mixed relay ===
Pos.		Points
1.	France	427
2.	Russia	394
3.	Norway	349
4.	Sweden	318
5.	Ukraine	312

- Final standings after 8 races.

=== Nation ===
Pos.		Points
1.	Russia	7698
2.	Germany	7148
3.	Norway	6632
4.	Ukraine	6349
5.	Sweden	6164

- Final standings after 24 races.

== Medal table ==
Rank	Nation	Gold	Silver	Bronze	Total
1	Russia	19	15	14	48
2	France	10	10	6	26
3	Norway	9	8	8	25
4	Germany	4	5	10	19
5	Ukraine	2	3	4	9
6	Austria	2	2	1	5
7	Latvia	1	0	0	1
7	Poland	1	0	0	1
9	Bulgaria	0	1	1	2
10	Belgium	0	1	0	1
10	Czech Republic	0	1	0	1
10	Italy	0	1	0	1
10	Sweden	0	1	0	1
14	Belarus	0	0	1	1
14	Japan	0	0	1	1
14	Switzerland	0	0	1	1
14	United States	0	0	1	1
Totals (17 entries)		48	48	48	144
