= Yuliya Zhuravok =

Ukrainian biathlete (born 1994)

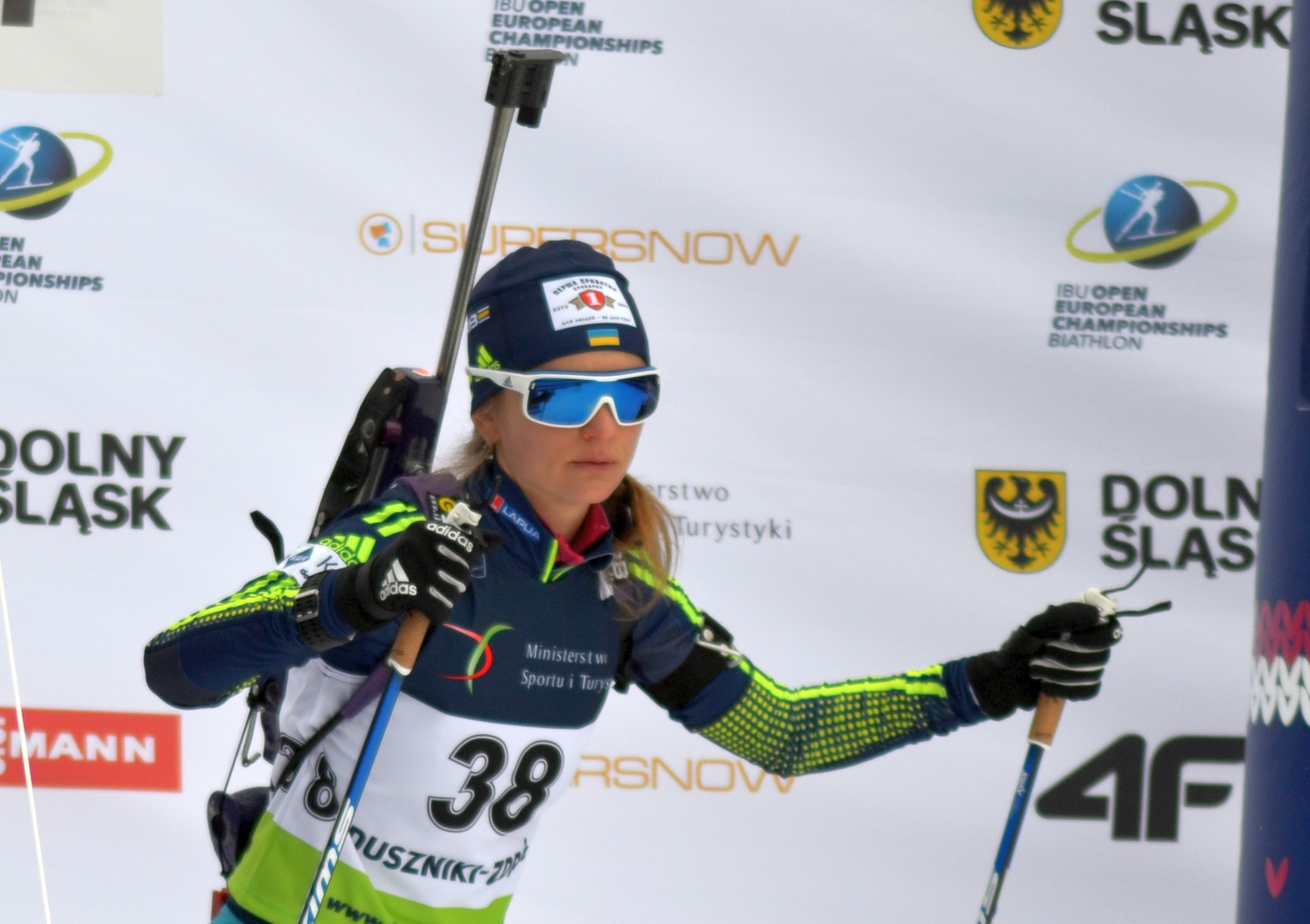
- Zhuravok at 2017 EC

Personal information
- Full name: Yuliya Mykolayivna Zhuravok
- Born: 10 November 1994 (age 31) Anzhero-Sudzhensk, Kemerovo Oblast, Russia
- Height: 163

Sport
- Sport: Skiing
- Club: Dynamo

World Cup career
- Seasons: 2011–2022
Medal record
European Championships
Gold medal – first place	2018 Ridnaun	Mixed relay
Silver medal – second place	2019 Raubichi	15 km individual
Junior World Championships
Gold medal – first place	2015 Minsk	12.5 km individual
Bronze medal – third place	2015 Minsk	10 km pursuit
Youth World Championships
Gold medal – first place	2012 Kontiolahti	3 × 6 km relay
Silver medal – second place	2013 Obertilliach	10 km individual
Silver medal – second place	2013 Obertilliach	3 × 6 km relay
Junior European Championships
Gold medal – first place	2014 Nové Město	Mixed relay
Bronze medal – third place	2013 Bansko	Mixed relay
Bronze medal – third place	2015 Otepää	Individual
Bronze medal – third place	2015 Otepää	Mixed relay

Yuliya Zhuravok (born in Anzhero-Sudzhensk, Kemerovo Oblast, Russia, on 10 November 1994) is a Ukrainian former biathlete. She became junior world champion in 2015, and represented Ukraine twice at the Biathlon World Championships: in 2015 in Kontiolahti and 2019 in Östersund. She also competed at the 2012 Winter Youth Olympics in Innsbruck, Austria, where she was 18th in sprint and 8th in pursuit. Her best World Cup finish was 10th in the individual race in Östersund during the 2016–17 season.

Zhuravok competed at the 2013 Winter Universiade in Trentino where she was 7th in the individual race and 14th in the mass start as well as at the 2017 Winter Universiade in Almaty where her best result was 4th in sprint.

== Performances ==
=== World Championships ===
Year	Event	IN	SP	PU	MS	RL	MRL
2015	Kontiolahti, Finland	28					
2019	Östersund, Sweden	14					

=== World Cup ===
==== Rankings ====
Season	Individual	Sprint	Pursuit	Mass starts	TOTAL
2014–15	50				82
2016–17	28				74
2018–19	50				82

=== IBU Cup ===
==== Individual podiums ====
Season	Place	Competition	Rank
2017–18	Lenzerheide, Switzerland	Individual	3
2017–18	Uvat, Russia	Individual	2
2017–18	Uvat, Russia	Sprint	3
2018–19	Arber, Germany	Individual	1
2019–20	Martell-Val Martello, Italy	Mass start 60	3
2019–20	Martell-Val Martello, Italy	Sprint	3

==== Relay podiums ====
Season	Place	Competition	Rank
2015–16	Ridnaun-Val Ridanna, Italy	Mixed relay	1
2015–16	Martell-Val Martello, Italy	Mixed relay	3
2016–17	Otepää, Estonia	Mixed relay	3
2017–18	Obertilliach, Austria	Mixed relay	3
2018–19	Ridnaun-Val Ridanna, Italy	Single mixed relay	3
2019–20	Brezno-Osrblie, Slovakia	Single mixed relay	3

== Personal life ==
Zhuravok studied at the Sumy Anton Makarenko State Pedagogical University.

In June 2021, Zhuravok gave birth to a son. Though she was included into the "A" national team for the 2022–23 season, she decided to dedicate more time to her family.
