= Biathlon World Championships 2017 – Women's pursuit =

Women's pursuit at the Biathlon World Championships 2017
- Location: Hochfilzen, Austria
- Dates: 12 February
- Competitors: 58 from 23 nations
- Winning time: 28:02.3

Medalists
gold medal	Laura Dahlmeier	Germany
silver medal	Darya Domracheva	Belarus
bronze medal	Gabriela Koukalová	Czech Republic

The Women's pursuit competition at the 2017 World Championships was held on 12 February 2017.

== Results ==
The race was started at 10:30.

Rank	Bib	Name	Nationality	Start	Penalties (P+P+S+S)	Time	Deficit
1st place, gold medalist(s)	2	Laura Dahlmeier	Germany	0:04	1 (1+0+0+0)	28:02.3	
2nd place, silver medalist(s)	27	Darya Domracheva	Belarus	1:26	0 (0+0+0+0)	28:13.9	+11.6
3rd place, bronze medalist(s)	1	Gabriela Koukalová	Czech Republic	0:00	3 (2+0+1+0)	28:18.9	+16.6
4	24	Irina Starykh	Russia	1:18	0 (0+0+0+0)	28:38.2	+35.9
5	28	Justine Braisaz	France	1:26	1 (0+1+0+0)	28:38.4	+36.1
6	7	Marie Dorin Habert	France	0:43	3 (1+0+2+0)	28:38.6	+36.3
7	12	Kaisa Mäkäräinen	Finland	0:57	1 (0+0+0+1)	28:39.5	+37.2
8	10	Anastasiya Merkushyna	Ukraine	0:55	0 (0+0+0+0)	28:50.8	+48.5
9	9	Célia Aymonier	France	0:54	2 (0+1+0+1)	29:00.0	+57.7
10	21	Dorothea Wierer	Italy	1:14	3 (1+0+2+0)	29:05.2	+1:02.9
11	3	Anaïs Chevalier	France	0:25	2 (0+0+1+1)	29:13.1	+1:10.8
12	31	Paulína Fialková	Slovakia	1:33	2 (0+0+2+0)	29:18.2	+1:15.9
13	8	Anastasiya Kuzmina	Slovakia	0:44	3 (1+0+2+0)	29:23.5	+1:21.2
14	4	Lisa Vittozzi	Italy	0:25	3 (1+1+1+0)	29:28.1	+1:25.8
15	43	Alexia Runggaldier	Italy	1:50	0 (0+0+0+0)	29:28.9	+1:26.6
16	54	Marte Olsbu	Norway	2:05	1 (0+0+1+0)	29:33.9	+1:31.6
17	5	Federica Sanfilippo	Italy	0:32	4 (1+0+3+0)	29:34.2	+1:31.9
18	16	Tatiana Akimova	Russia	1:06	3 (1+0+1+1)	29:37.7	+1:35.4
19	25	Nadezhda Skardino	Belarus	1:19	1 (1+0+0+0)	29:37.7	+1:35.4
20	6	Vanessa Hinz	Germany	0:38	4 (1+2+1+0)	29:42.2	+1:39.9
21	45	Kaia Wøien Nicolaisen	Norway	1:51	1 (1+0+0+0)	29:46.1	+1:43.8
22	29	Susan Dunklee	United States	1:27	4 (1+0+1+2)	29:47.0	+1:44.7
23	22	Yuliia Dzhima	Ukraine	1:16	4 (0+0+2+2)	29:51.7	+1:49.4
24	33	Svetlana Sleptsova	Russia	1:40	2 (0+1+0+1)	29:52.9	+1:50.6
25	38	Magdalena Gwizdoń	Poland	1:44	1 (0+0+0+1)	29:54.9	+1:52.6
26	23	Lisa Hauser	Austria	1:17	3 (0+1+1+1)	29:58.1	+1:55.8
27	50	Baiba Bendika	Latvia	1:58	0 (0+0+0+0)	29:59.9	+1:57.6
28	19	Franziska Hildebrand	Germany	1:12	4 (1+2+1+0)	30:01.8	+1:59.5
29	11	Selina Gasparin	Switzerland	0:56	4 (2+1+1+0)	30:05.6	+2:03.3
30	13	Tiril Eckhoff	Norway	1:01	6 (1+1+2+2)	30:08.0	+2:05.7
31	17	Eva Puskarčíková	Czech Republic	1:09	5 (0+4+1+0)	30:08.4	+2:06.1
32	46	Nadine Horchler	Germany	1:52	1 (0+0+1+0)	30:09.4	+2:07.1
33	18	Anna Frolina	South Korea	1:11	3 (1+2+0+0)	30:10.3	+2:08.0
34	32	Lucie Charvátová	Czech Republic	1:34	4 (2+0+1+1)	30:14.3	+2:12.0
35	30	Teja Gregorin	Slovenia	1:30	4 (0+0+2+2)	30:22.9	+2:20.6
36	14	Anna Magnusson	Sweden	1:03	4 (1+2+1+0)	30:25.1	+2:22.8
37	37	Olga Poltoranina	Kazakhstan	1:41	1 (0+1+0+0)	30:29.3	+2:27.0
38	49	Joanne Reid	United States	1:58	1 (0+0+0+1)	30:39.6	+2:37.3
39	15	Irina Uslugina	Russia	1:04	4 (0+2+1+1)	30:42.1	+2:39.8
40	55	Maren Hammerschmidt	Germany	2:08	4 (1+1+1+1)	30:46.6	+2:44.3
41	20	Clare Egan	United States	1:12	3 (1+0+2+0)	31:03.6	+3:01.3
42	47	Dunja Zdouc	Austria	1:56	1 (1+0+0+0)	31:04.4	+3:02.1
43	26	Rosanna Crawford	Canada	1:23	3 (1+1+0+1)	31:06.6	+3:04.3
44	52	Tang Jialin	China	2:01	2 (0+1+1+0)	31:07.7	+3:05.4
45	36	Iryna Kryuko	Belarus	1:41	3 (1+0+0+2)	31:07.9	+3:05.6
46	56	Mona Brorsson	Sweden	2:10	2 (0+0+1+1)	31:18.7	+3:16.4
47	53	Krystyna Guzik	Poland	2:01	3 (0+0+2+1)	31:26.8	+3:24.5
48	35	Lena Häcki	Switzerland	1:40	6 (1+2+2+1)	31:30.7	+3:28.4
49	40	Hanna Öberg	Sweden	1:46	5 (3+1+0+1)	31:33.8	+3:31.5
50	48	Aita Gasparin	Switzerland	1:57	4 (0+0+2+2)	31:43.4	+3:41.1
51	39	Monika Hojnisz	Poland	1:45	4 (0+2+1+1)	31:46.8	+3:44.5
52	41	Anna Kistanova	Kazakhstan	1:48	5 (1+0+2+2)	31:55.2	+3:52.9
53	42	Emilia Yordanova	Bulgaria	1:49	4 (1+2+0+1)	32:12.2	+4:09.9
54	51	Darya Usanova	Kazakhstan	2:00	6 (1+0+4+1)	32:18.3	+4:16.0
55	58	Hilde Fenne	Norway	2:12	8 (1+2+4+1)	32:59.1	+4:56.8
56	60	Katharina Innerhofer	Austria	2:19	7 (1+0+3+3)	33:04.4	+5:02.1
57	44	Chardine Sloof	Sweden	1:50	8 (3+3+1+1)	33:28.6	+5:26.3
58	59	Sari Furuya	Japan	2:12	7 (1+2+3+1)	33:36.7	+5:34.4
—	34	Olena Pidhrushna	Ukraine	1:40	DNS		
—	57	Mari Laukkanen	Finland	2:10	DNS		
