= Artem Pryma =

Ukrainian biathlete (born 1987)

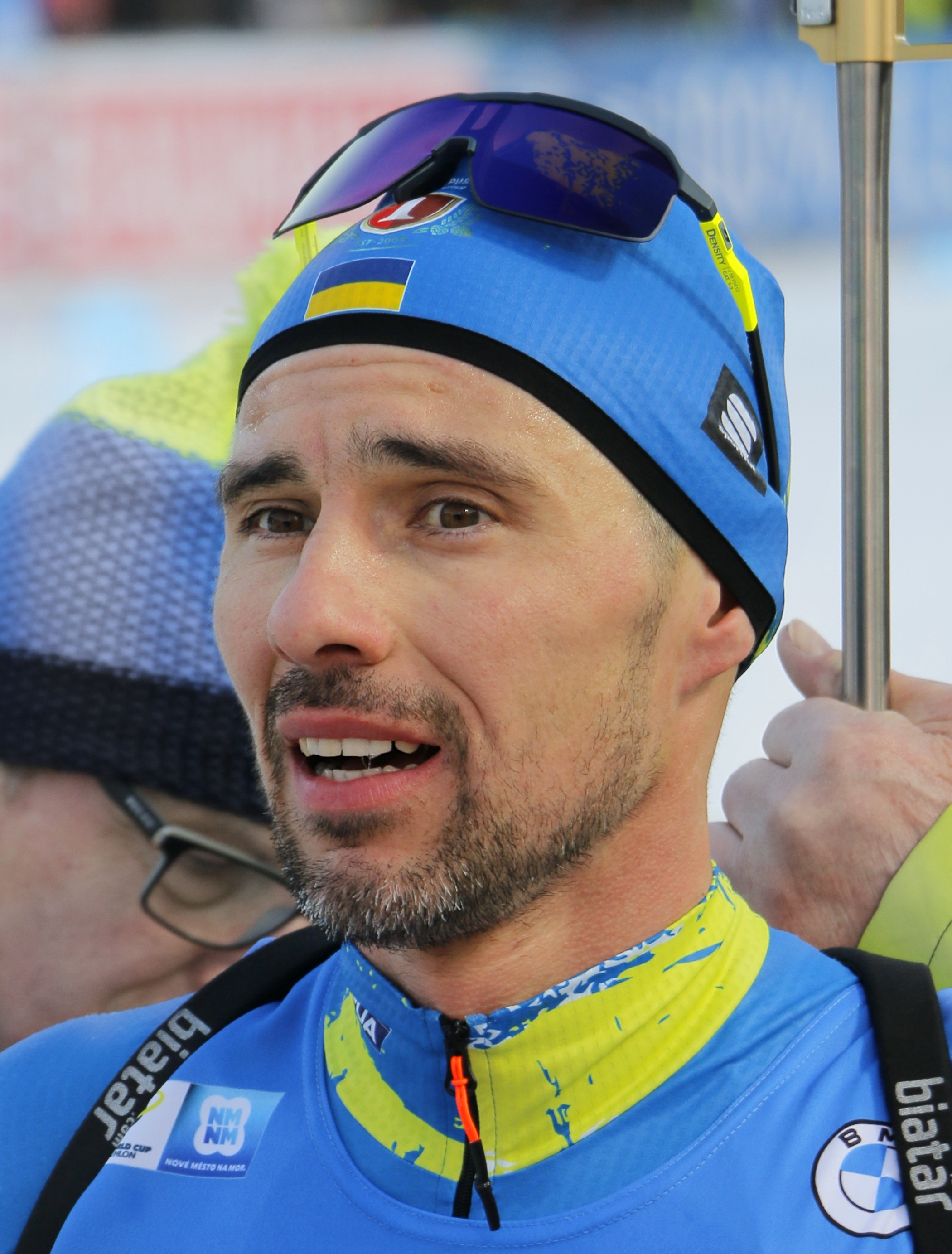
- Pryma in 2023

Personal information
- Born: 30 May 1987 (age 39) Chernihiv, Ukrainian SSR
- Height: 1.80 m (5 ft 11 in)

Sport
- Sport: Skiing
- Club: Ukrainian Military Forces

World Cup career
- Seasons: 2008–
Medal record
Men's biathlon
Representing Ukraine
European Championships
| Gold medal – first place | 2011 Ridanna | Individual |
| Gold medal – first place | 2015 Otepää | Relay |
| Gold medal – first place | 2018 Ridnaun | Mixed relay |
| Gold medal – first place | 2020 Raubichi | Mixed relay |
| Gold medal – first place | 2021 Duszniki-Zdrój | Pursuit |
| Silver medal – second place | 2012 Osrblie | Sprint |
| Silver medal – second place | 2012 Osrblie | Individual |
| Bronze medal – third place | 2013 Bansko | Sprint |
| Bronze medal – third place | 2021 Duszniki-Zdrój | Mixed relay |
European Junior Championships
| Bronze medal – third place | 2008 Nové Město | Relay |
Universiade
| Gold medal – first place | 2011 Erzurum | Sprint |
| Gold medal – first place | 2011 Erzurum | Mixed relay |
| Silver medal – second place | 2011 Erzurum | Pursuit |
| Silver medal – second place | 2011 Erzurum | Mass start |
- Updated on 22 January 2018

Artem Pryma (Ukrainian: Артем Прима, born 30 May 1987, Chernihiv, Ukrainian SSR) is a former Ukrainian World Cup level biathlete. He participated at 2014 and 2018 Winter Olympics.

== Career ==
Pryma began competing internationally in 2006 but only participated in junior competitions. He debuted at World Cup on 14 January 2010, in German Ruhpolding, where he was 41st in the sprint. Then he started in relay together with his brother Roman but Roman screwed it up and had a penalty loop. The team finished 12th in that race. His first World Cup points he earned next year. At 2011 World Championships he was 25th in individual race.

At 2011 Winter Universiade in Erzurum, Turkey, he won four medals, including two gold. Together with Serhiy Semenov and Vita Semerenko, they were the most successful biathletes at those competitions. He is also 2011 European champion in individual race. In the next season, he also won some more European medals.

At 2014 Winter Olympics in Russian Sochi, his best result was just 32nd in sprint.

He qualified to represent Ukraine at the 2018 Winter Olympics. In Pyeongchang he was 46th in individual, 40th in sprint and 38th in pursuit. He also participated in two relays being 7th in mixed relay and 9th in classical relay.

On 10 March 2018, Artem achieved his first World Cup podium. He was second in the mixed relay in Kontiolahti, Finland.

== Personal life ==
Roman Pryma, a former biathlete and current coach, is Artem's elder brother.

== Career results ==
=== Winter Olympics ===
| Event | Individual | Sprint | Pursuit | Mass start | Relay | Mixed relay |
|---|---|---|---|---|---|---|
| (Russia) 2014 Sochi | 81st | 32nd | 44th | — | 9th | — |
| (South Korea) 2018 Pyeongchang | 46th | 40th | 38th | — | 9th | 7th |
| (China) 2022 Beijing | 37th | 15th | — | — | — | 13th |

=== World Championships ===
| Event | Individual | Sprint | Pursuit | Mass start | Relay | Mixed relay | Single mixed relay |
|---|---|---|---|---|---|---|---|
| (Russia) 2011 Khanty-Mansiysk | 25 | — | — | — | — | — | —N/a |
| (Germany) 2012 Ruhpolding | 24 | 35 | 44 | — | 8 | — | —N/a |
| (Czech Republic) 2013 Nové Město | 47 | 42 | 36 | — | 14 | — | —N/a |
| (Finland) 2015 Kontiolahti | 34 | 62 | — | — | 9 | — | —N/a |
| (Norway) 2016 Oslo Holmenkollen | — | 22 | 32 | — | — | — | —N/a |
| (Austria) 2017 Hochfilzen | — | — | — | — | 6 | — | —N/a |
| (Sweden) 2019 Östersund | — | — | — | — | 12th | 7th | — |
| (Italy) 2020 Antholz | 36th | 25th | 24th | 20th | 12th | 5th | — |
| (Slovenia) 2021 Pokljuka | 9th | 20th | 8th | 21st | 5th | 4th | 4th |
| (Germany) 2023 Oberhof | — | 44th | 39th | — | 13th | — | — |
| (Czech Republic) 2024 Nové Město na Moravě | 62nd | 60th | DNS | | 13th | 7th | |

=== World Cup ===
==== Relay podiums ====
| Season | Place | Competition | Rank |
|---|---|---|---|
| 2017–18 | Kontiolahti, Finland | Mixed relay | 2 |
| 2019–20 | Nové Město, Czech Republic | Relay | 2 |

==== Rankings ====
| Season | Individual | Sprint | Pursuit | Mass start | Overall Position |
|---|---|---|---|---|---|
| 2010–11 | 56 | 70 | — | — | 74 |
| 2011–12 | 36 | 39 | 79 | 47 | 46 |
| 2012–13 | 52 | 56 | 66 | — | 58 |
| 2013–14 | — | 47 | 73 | 42 | 55 |
| 2014–15 | 55 | 49 | 51 | — | 53 |
| 2015–16 | 43 | 42 | 44 | 37 | 42 |
| 2016–17 | — | 38 | 28 | — | 37 |
| 2017–18 | 21 | 55 | 41 | — | 45 |
| 2018–19 | 49 | 34 | 36 | 33 | 35 |
| 2019–20 | 32 | 25 | 18 | 25 | 23 |

=== IBU Cup ===
==== Individual podiums ====
| Season | Place | Competition | Placement |
|---|---|---|---|
| 2010–11 | Martello, Italy | Sprint | 3 |

==== Relay podiums ====
| Season | Place | Competition | Placement |
|---|---|---|---|
| 2015–16 | Ridnaun, Italy | Mixed relay | 1 |
| 2017–18 | Obertilliach, Austria | Single mixed relay | 3 |
