= Biathlon European Championships 2011 =

International biathlon competition

The 18th Biathlon European Championships were held in Ridnaun, Italy from February 21 to February 27, 2011.

There were total of 15 competitions held: sprint, pursuit and individual both for U26 and U21, relay races for U26 and a mixed relay for U21.

== Schedule of events ==
Biathlon European Championships 2011 official logo

The schedule of the event stands below. All times in CET.

Date	Event
February 21	U26 Men's 20 km individual
February 22	U26 Women's 15 km individual
February 22	U21 Men's 20 km individual
February 22	U21 Women's 15 km individual
February 24	U26 Men's 4 x 7.5 km relay
February 24	U21 Women's 4 x 6 km relay
February 24	U21 2 x 6 + 2 x 7.5 km mixed relay
February 26	U26 Men's 10 km sprint
February 26	U26 Women's 7.5 km sprint
February 26	U21 Men's 10 km sprint
February 26	U21 Women's 7.5 km sprint
February 27	U26 Men's 12.5 km pursuit
February 27	U26 Women's 10 km pursuit
February 27	U21 Men's 12.5 km pursuit
February 27	U21 Women's 10 km pursuit

== Results ==
=== U26 ===
==== Men's ====
Event	Gold	Silver	Bronze
Men's 10 km sprint	(Austria) Tobias Eberhard	(Russia) Alexey Volkov	(Italy) Lukas Hofer
Men's 12.5 km pursuit	(Russia) Alexey Volkov	(Bulgaria) Krasimir Anev	(France) Jean-Guillaume Béatrix
Men's 20 km individual	(Ukraine) Artem Pryma	(Russia) Evgeny Ustyugov	(Bulgaria) Krasimir Anev
Men's 4 x 7.5 km relay	(Germany) Germany; Robin Kiel; Benedikt Doll; Florian Graf; Erik Lesser	(Russia) Russia; Nikolay Yakushov; Viacheslav Akimov; Timofey Lapshin; Victor Vasilyev	(Belarus) Belarus; Vladimir Alenishko; Vladimir Chepelin; Maksim Yeliseyeu; Yuryi Liadov

==== Women's ====
Event	Gold	Silver	Bronze
Women's 7.5 km sprint	(Germany) Juliane Döll	(Czech Republic) Gabriela Soukalová	(France) Marine Bolliet
Women's 10 km pursuit	(Germany) Juliane Döll	(France) Marine Bolliet	(Germany) Nadine Horchler
Women's 15 km individual	(Germany) Juliane Döll	(Ukraine) Olena Pidhrushna	(Russia) Ekaterina Glazyrina
Women's 4 x 6 km relay	(Ukraine) Ukraine; Olena Pidhrushna; Vita Semerenko; Juliya Dzhyma; Valentina Semerenko	(Italy) Italy; Dorothea Wierer; Roberta Fiandino; Michela Andreola; Karin Oberhofer	(Germany) Germany; Franziska Hildebrand; Susann König; Nadine Horchler; Juliane Döll

=== U21 ===
==== Men's ====
Event	Gold	Silver	Bronze
Men's 10 km sprint	(Russia) Viacheslav Akimov	(Germany) Benedikt Doll	(Czech Republic) Michal Krčmář
Men's 12.5 km pursuit	(Russia) Viacheslav Akimov	(Germany) Benedikt Doll	(Czech Republic) Michal Krčmář
Men's 20 km individual	(Russia) Nikolay Yakushov	(France) Simon Desthieux	(Russia) Ivan Kryukov

==== Women's ====
Event	Gold	Silver	Bronze
Women's 7.5 km sprint	(Russia) Aleksandra Alikina	(Italy) Dorothea Wierer	(Russia) Olga Galich
Women's 10 km pursuit	(Italy) Dorothea Wierer	(Russia) Olga Galich	(Russia) Svetlana Perminova
Women's 15 km individual	(Russia) Olga Galich	(France) Enora Latuillière	(Italy) Giulia Collavo

==== Mixed ====
Event	Gold	Silver	Bronze
Mixed relay	(Russia) Russia; Olga Galich; Svetlana Perminova; Ivan Kryukov; Aleksandr Pechenkin	(France) France; Florie Vigneron; Enora Latuillière; Valentin Gaillard; Simon Desthieux	(Belarus) Belarus; Iryna Kryuko; Darya Nesterchik; Aliaksei Abromchyk; Aliaksandr Darozhka

== Medal table ==
Rank	Nation	Gold	Silver	Bronze	Total
1	Russia (RUS)	7	4	4	15
2	Germany (GER)	4	2	2	8
3	Ukraine (UKR)	2	1	0	3
4	Italy (ITA)	1	2	2	5
5	Austria (AUT)	1	0	0	1
6	France (FRA)	0	4	2	6
7	Czech Republic (CZE)	0	1	2	3
8	Bulgaria (BUL)	0	1	1	2
9	Belarus (BLR)	0	0	2	2
Totals (9 entries)		15	15	15	45
