= 2018 IBU Open European Championships =

International biathlon competition

The 25th IBU Open European Championships were held in Ridnaun-Val Ridanna, Italy from January 23 to January 28, 2018. It was also a stage of the 2017–18 Biathlon IBU Cup.

There were a total of eight competitions held: Single Mixed Relay, Relay Mixed, Sprint Women, Sprint Men, Pursuit Women, Pursuit Men, Individual Women and Individual Men.

== Schedule of events ==
The schedule of the event stands below. All times in CET.

Date	Time	Event
January 24	10:00	Individual Men
January 24	13:30	Individual Women
January 26	11:00	Sprint Men
January 26	14:00	Sprint Women
January 27	13:00	Pursuit Men
January 27	15:00	Pursuit Women
January 28	13:00	Single Mixed Relay
January 28	15:00	Relay Mixed

== Results ==
=== Men's ===
Event	Gold		Silver		Bronze	
Men's 20 km individual Details	Felix Leitner; Austria	53:32.8 (0+0+0+1)	Tomáš Krupčík; Czech Republic	54:15.8 (0+0+0+1)	Philipp Horn; Germany	54:29.4 (1+0+0+0)
Men's 10 km sprint Details	Andrejs Rastorgujevs; Latvia	24:03.0 (0+1)	Alexandr Loginov; Russia	24:08.5 (1+0)	Krasimir Anev; Bulgaria	24:27.5 (0+0)
Men's 12.5 km pursuit Details	Alexandr Loginov; Russia	32:22.1 (1+0+0+1)	Krasimir Anev; Bulgaria	32:49.7 (0+0+0+0)	Evgeniy Garanichev; Russia	33:32.8 (1+0+2+0)

=== Women's ===
Event	Gold		Silver		Bronze	
Women's 15 km individual Details	Chloé Chevalier; France	46:32.9 (1+0+0+0)	Alexia Runggaldier; Italy	47:20.6 (0+0+0+0)	Victoria Slivko; Russia	47:28.8 (0+0+0+0)
Women's 7.5 km sprint Details	Iryna Varvynets; Ukraine	20:54.1 (0+0)	Chloé Chevalier; France	21:06.6 (0+1)	Fuyuko Tachizaki; Japan	21:09.6 (0+0)
Women's 10 km pursuit Details	Chloé Chevalier; France	29:25.4 (0+0+0+0)	Iryna Varvynets; Ukraine	29:36.4 (0+0+1+0)	Julia Simon; France	30:08.6 (0+1+0+0)

=== Mixed ===
Event	Gold		Silver		Bronze	
Single mixed relay Details	Norway Thekla Brun-Lie; Vetle Sjåstad Christiansen	35:39.6	France Julia Simon; Émilien Jacquelin	35:48.2	United States Susan Dunklee; Lowell Bailey	35:48.7
2 x 6 + 2 x 7.5 km relay Details	Ukraine Yuliya Zhuravok; Iryna Varvynets; Artem Pryma; Dmytro Pidruchnyi	1:11:40.1	Russia Victoria Slivko; Anastasia Zagoruiko; Evgeniy Garanichev; Alexandr Loginov	1:11:51.8	Norway Emilie Aagheim Kalkenberg; Kaia Wøien Nicolaisen; Håvard Gutubø Bogetveit; Fredrik Gjesbakk	1:12:13.3

== Medal table ==
Rank	Nation	Gold	Silver	Bronze	Total
1	France (FRA)	2	2	1	5
2	Ukraine (UKR)	2	1	0	3
3	Russia (RUS)	1	2	2	5
4	Norway (NOR)	1	0	1	2
5	Austria (AUT)	1	0	0	1
5	Latvia (LAT)	1	0	0	1
7	Bulgaria (BUL)	0	1	1	2
8	Czech Republic (CZE)	0	1	0	1
8	Italy (ITA)	0	1	0	1
10	Germany (GER)	0	0	1	1
10	Japan (JPN)	0	0	1	1
10	United States (USA)	0	0	1	1
Totals (12 entries)		8	8	8	24
