= Uvatsky District =

Uvatsky District Уватский район (Russian)
- District
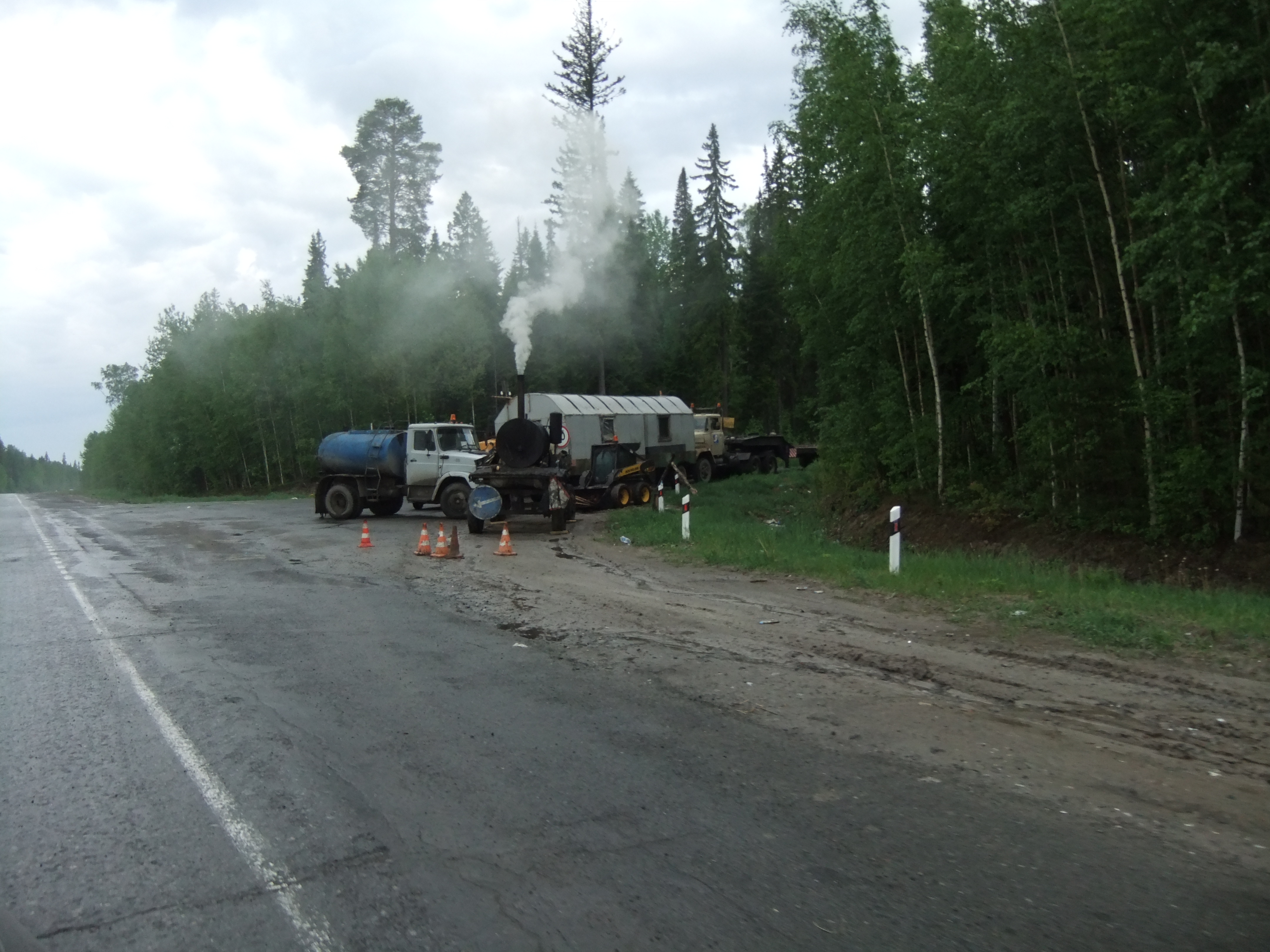
- Road repair, Uvatsky District

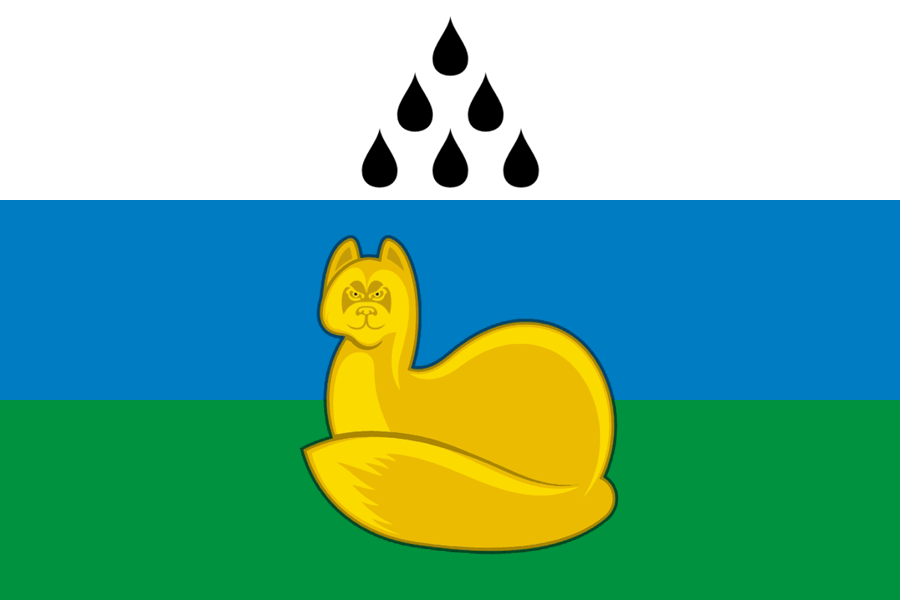
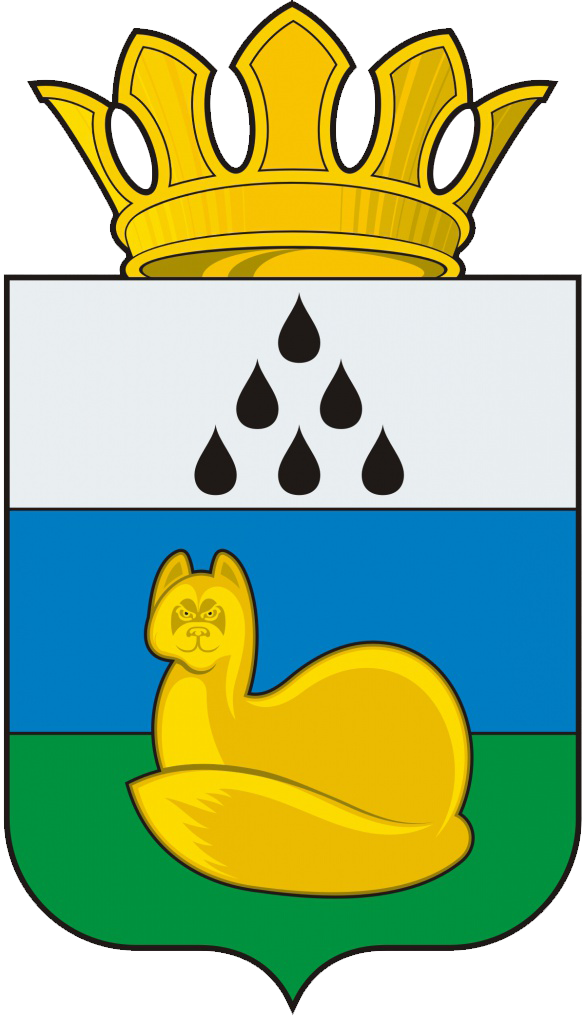
- Flag Coat of arms
- Location of Uvatsky District in Tyumen Oblast
- Coordinates: 59°08′35″N 68°53′08″E
- Country: Russia
- Federal subject: Tyumen Oblast
- Established: 1923
- Administrative center: Uvat

Area
  - Total: 48,320.9 km^{2} (18,656.8 sq mi)

Population (2010 Census)
  - Total: 19,452
  - Density: 0.40256/km^{2} (1.0426/sq mi)
  - Urban: 0%
  - Rural: 100%

Administrative structure
  - Administrative divisions: 12 Rural okrugs
  - Inhabited localities: 33 rural localities

Municipal structure
  - Municipally incorporated as: Uvatsky Municipal District
  - Municipal divisions: 0 urban settlements, 12 rural settlements
- Time zone: UTC+5 (MSK+2)
- OKTMO ID: 71648000
- Website: http://www.uvatregion.ru/

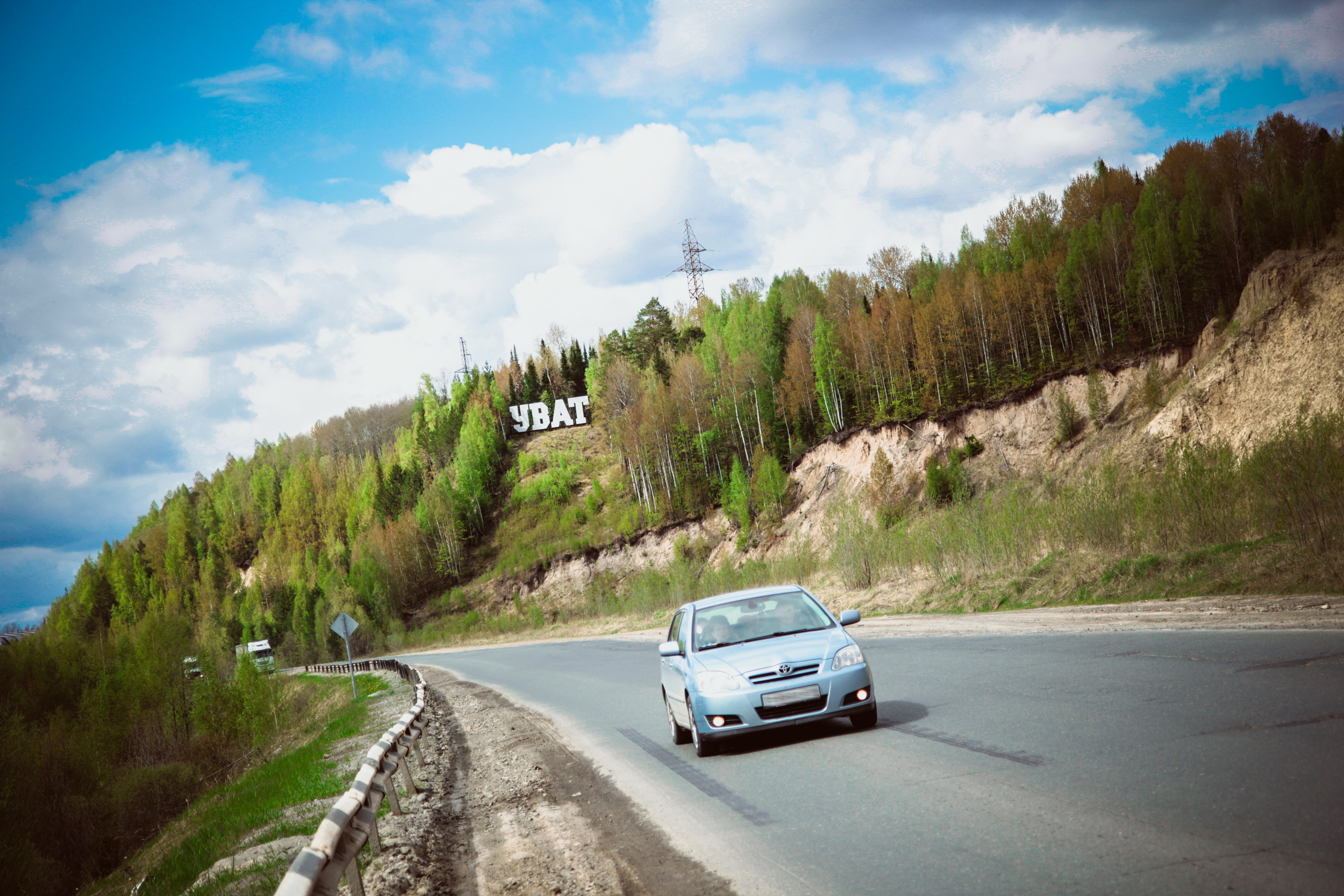
Road to Uvat

Uvatsky District (Russian: Ува́тский райо́н) is an administrative district (raion), one of the twenty-two in Tyumen Oblast, Russia. As a municipal division, it is incorporated as Uvatsky Municipal District. It is located in the northern and northeastern parts of the oblast. The area of the district is 48,320.9 square kilometers (18,656.8 sq mi). Its administrative center is the rural locality (a selo) of Uvat. Population: 19,452 (2010 Census); 19,271 (2002 census); 19,472 (1989 Soviet census). The population of Uvat accounts for 25.5% of the district's total population.
