= Biathlon European Championships 2011 – Women's 4 x 6 km Relay =

The women's relay competition of the Biathlon European Championships 2011 was held on February 24, 2011, at 12:30 local time.

Place	Country	Team	Penalties	Time
1	Ukraine	Olena Pidhrushna; Vita Semerenko; Juliya Dzhyma; Valj Semerenko	1:19:52.0	0+0 - 0+1; 0+0 - 0+1; 0+1 - 0+1; 0+1 - 0+0
2	Italy	Dorothea Wierer; Roberta Fiandino; Michela Andreola; Karin Oberhofer	+52,2	0+2 - 0+2; 0+0 - 0+0; 0+0 - 0+2; 0+1 - 0+0
3	Germany	Franziska Hildebrand; Susann König; Nadine Horchler; Juliane Döll	+1:01,7	0+0 - 0+2; 0+1 - 0+1; 0+1 - 0+1; 0+2 - 0+1
4	Russia	Anna Kunayeva; Yevgenya Sedova; Ekaterina Shumilova; Ekaterina Glazyrina	+2:35.1	0+0 - 0+2; 0+2 - 1+3; 0+2 - 0+1; 0+2 - 0+3
5	Austria	Iris Waldhuber; Ramona Düringer; Katharina Innerhofer; Romana Schrempf	+2:46.1	0+1 - 0+0; 0+3 - 0+0; 0+3 - 0+3; 1+3 - 0+1
6	Belarus	Iryna Babezkaja; Darya Yurkevich; Ala Talkach; Nastassja Dubaresawa	+2:57.0	0+1 - 0+2; 0+1 - 0+1; 0+1 - 0+2; 0+1 - 0+2
7	France	Jacquemine Baud; Marine Bolliet; Marine Dusser; Claire Breton	+4:36.7	0+0 - 0+2; 0+0 - 0+1; 0+1 - 2+3; 0+2 - 0+1
8	Czech Republic	Gabriela Soukalová; Veronika Zvařičová; Lea Johanidesová; Barbora Tomešová	+6:01.8	0+1 - 0+1; 1+3 - 0+2; 0+1 - 0+1; 0+3 - 0+1
9	Norway	Tiril Eckhoff; Ane Skrove Nossum; Birgitte Røksund; Bente Landheim	+6:18.9	0+3 - 0+0; 0+2 - 1+3; 0+0 - 0+3; 0+2 - 0+3
10	Canada	Rosanna Crawford; Melanie Schultz; Claude Godbout; Emma Lodge	+8:38.8	0+2 - 0+2; 0+1 - 0+0; 0+1 - 0+2; 0+2 - 1+3
11	Poland	Monika Hojnisz; Beata Szymańczak; Patrycja Hojnisz; Karolina Pitoń	LPD	0+2 - 0+0; 0+1 - 2+3; 2+3 - 0+0; 0+2 - 0+0
