= Franziska Hildebrand =

German biathlete (born 1987)

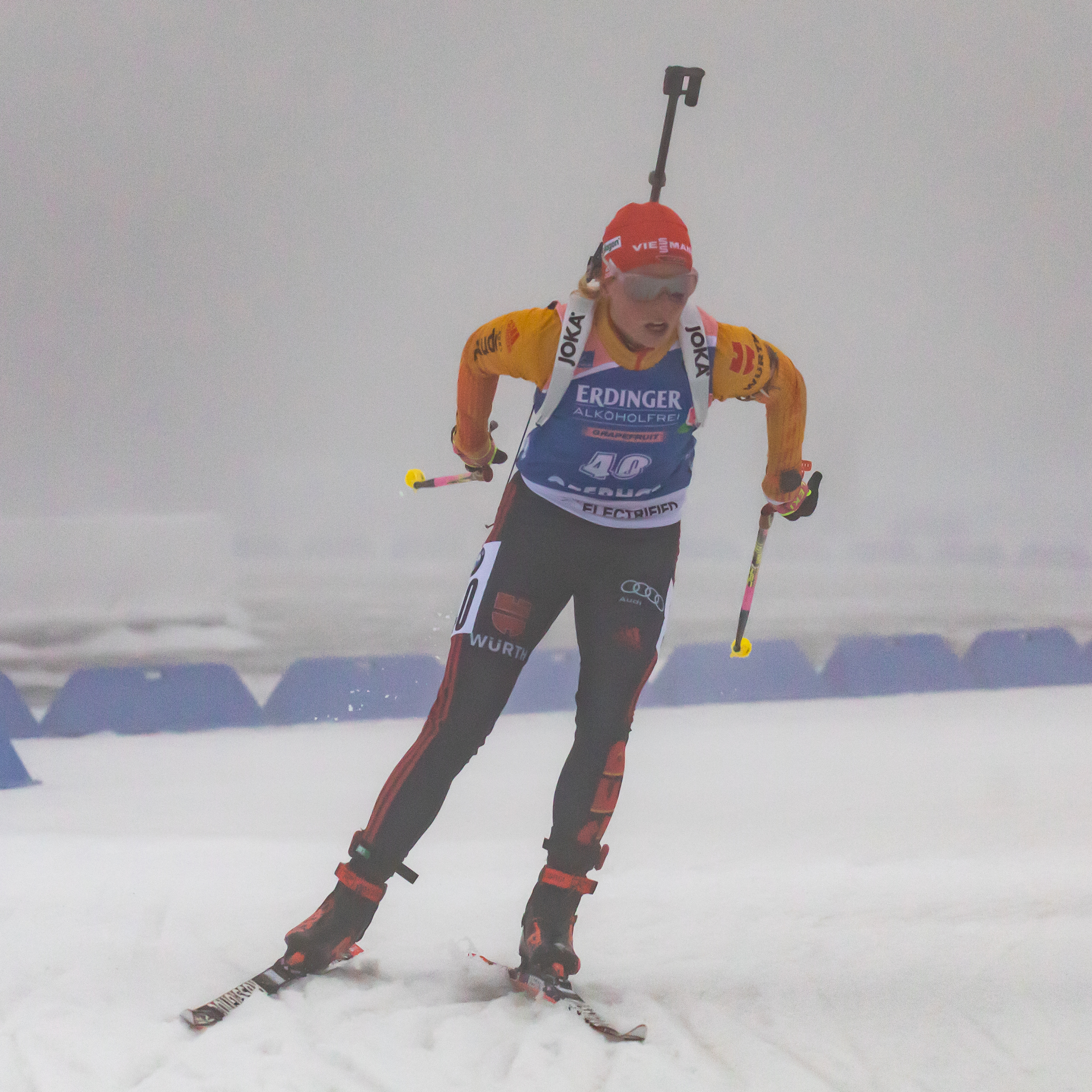
- Franziska Hildebrand during IBU Biathlon World Cup competitions in Oberhof, Thuringia, Germany in January 2020

Personal information
- Nationality: German
- Born: 24 March 1987 (age 39) Halle (Saale), East Germany
- Height: 1.62 m (5 ft 4 in)

Sport

Professional information
- Sport: Biathlon
- Club: WSV Clausthal-Zellerfeld
- World Cup debut: 2011

Olympic Games
- Teams: 2 (2014, 2018)
- Medals: 0 (0 gold)

World Championships
- Teams: 6 (2012–2019)
- Medals: 4 (2 gold)
Medal record
World Championships
| Gold medal – first place | 2015 Kontiolahti | 4 x 6 km relay |
| Gold medal – first place | 2017 Hochfilzen | 4 x 6 km relay |
| Silver medal – second place | 2016 Oslo | Mixed relay |
| Bronze medal – third place | 2016 Oslo | 4 × 6 km relay |
European Championships
| Gold medal – first place | 2010 Otepää | 4 × 6 km relay |
| Silver medal – second place | 2022 Arber | 7.5 km sprint |
| Bronze medal – third place | 2010 Otepää | 15 km individual |
| Bronze medal – third place | 2011 Ridnaun | 4 × 6 km relay |
| Bronze medal – third place | 2022 Arber | Single mixed relay |
Junior World Championships
| Gold medal – first place | 2007 Martell | 3 × 6 km relay |
| Gold medal – first place | 2008 Ruhpolding | 3 × 6 km relay |

Franziska Hildebrand (born 24 March 1987) is a former German biathlete. Hildebrand started in her first world cup races in the 2011/12-season after winning three medals at the two previous European Championships. In 2014, she participated in the Winter Olympics in Sochi. She was officially nominated by the DOSB on 23 January 2014. She retired after 2021/2022, one day after she announced pregnancy.

== Record ==
=== Olympic Games ===
| Event | Individual | Sprint | Pursuit | Mass start | Relay | Mixed relay |
|---|---|---|---|---|---|---|
| (Russia) 2014 Sochi | 38th | — | — | 28th | 11th | — |
| (South Korea) 2018 Pyeongchang | 9th | 12th | 12th | — | 8th | — |

=== World Championships ===
| Event | Individual | Sprint | Pursuit | Mass Start | Relay | Mixed Relay |
|---|---|---|---|---|---|---|
| (Germany) 2012 Ruhpolding | — | 29th | 47th | 27th | — | — |
| (Czech Republic) 2013 Nové Město na Moravě | 51st | 27th | 15th | 26th | 5th | — |
| (Finland) 2015 Kontiolahti | 10th | 10th | 6th | 6th | Gold | — |
| (Norway) 2016 Oslo | 6th | 10th | 4th | 14th | Bronze | Silver |
| (Austria) 2017 Hochfilzen | 31st | 19th | 28th | 27th | Gold | — |
| (Sweden) 2019 Östersund | 31st | 40th | 22nd | 21st | 4th | — |
