= Tomáš Krupčík =

Czech biathlete (born 1988)

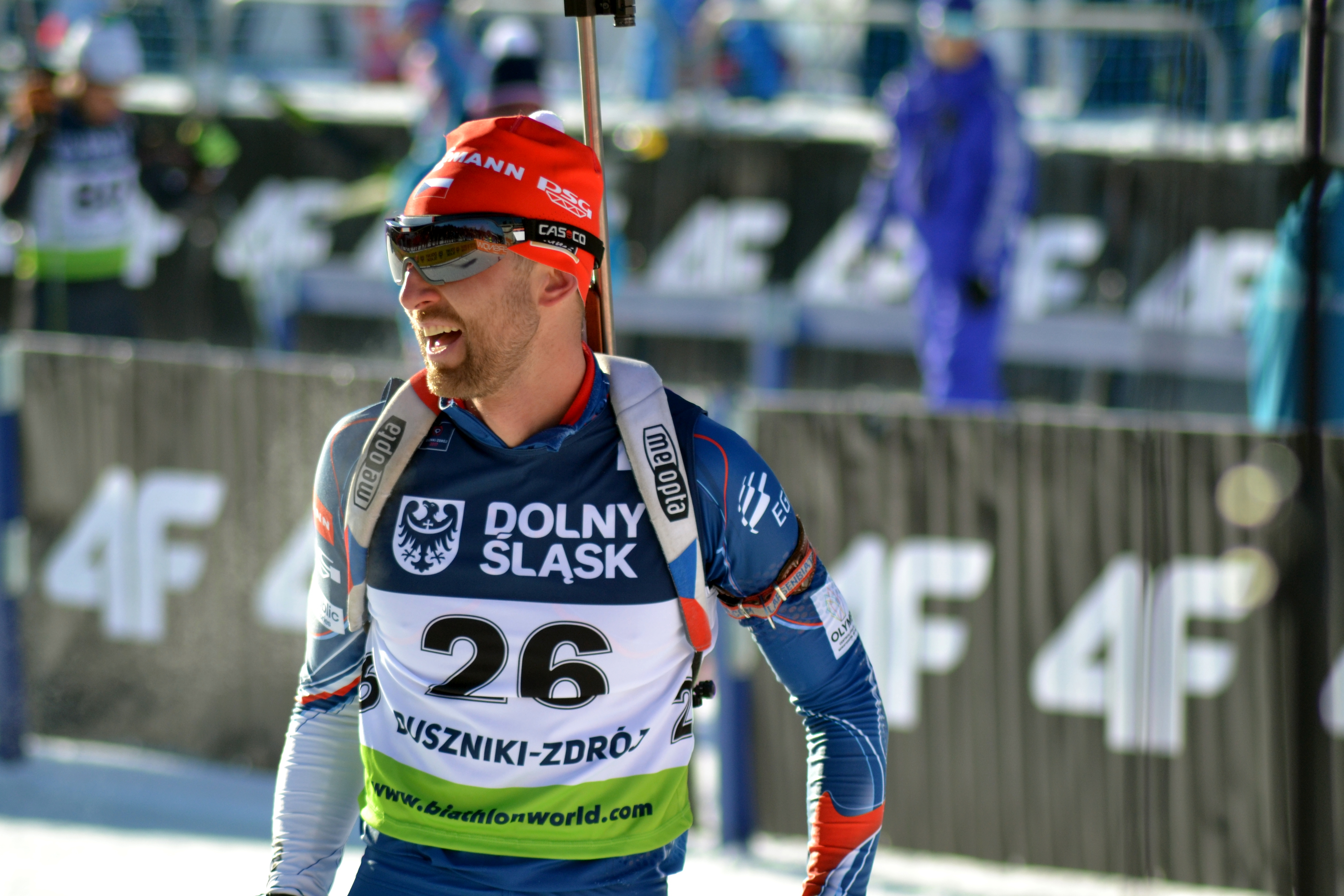
- Tomáš Krupčík in 2017

Personal information
- Born: 8 January 1988 (age 38) Jablonec nad Nisou, Czechoslovakia
- Height: 6 ft 1 in (185 cm)

Sport
- Sport: Skiing
Medal record
European Championships
Silver medal – second place	2018 Ridnaun	Individual

Tomáš Krupčík (born 8 January 1988) is a Czech biathlete. He competed at the 2014 Winter Olympics in Sochi, in sprint and the men's relay.

== Biathlon results ==
All results are sourced from the International Biathlon Union.

=== Olympic Games ===
0 medals

Event	Individual	Sprint	Pursuit	Mass start	Relay	Mixed relay
(Russia) 2014 Sochi	—	75th	—	—	11th	

=== World Championships ===
0 medals

Event	Individual	Sprint	Pursuit	Mass start	Relay	Mixed relay	Single mixed relay
(Finland) 2015 Kontiolahti	26th	—	—	—	—	—	—
(Austria) 2017 Hochfilzen	32nd	—	—	—	10th	—	—
(Sweden) 2019 Östersund	22nd	30th	18th	20th	4th	—	—

*During Olympic seasons competitions are only held for those events not included in the Olympic program.
**The single mixed relay was added as an event in 2019.
