= Uvat, Tyumen Oblast =

Rural locality in Tyumen Oblast, Russia

Coordinates: 59°08′25″N 68°53′38″E

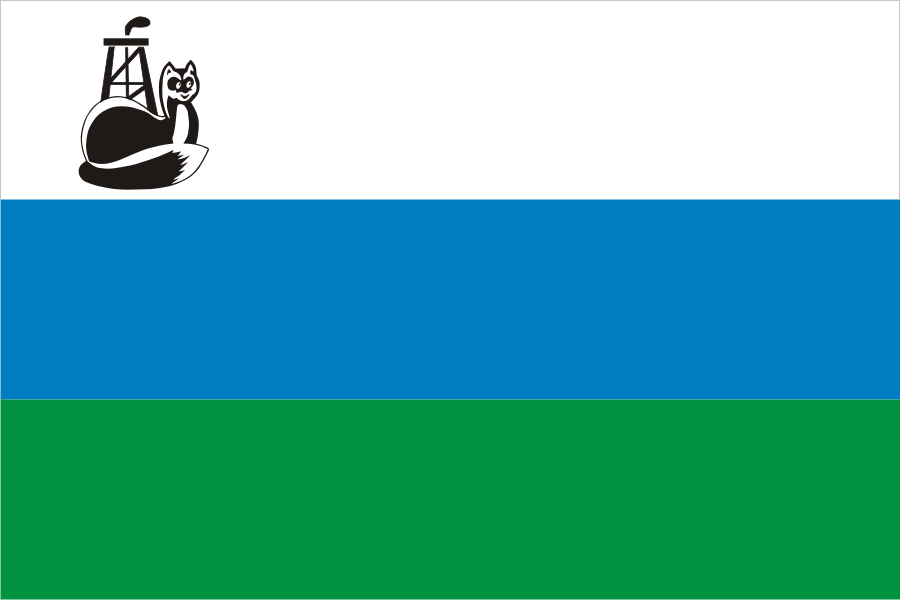
Flag of Uvat

Uvat (Russian: Уват) is a rural locality (a selo) and the administrative center of Uvatsky District, Tyumen Oblast, Russia. Population: 4,964 (2010 census); 4,610 (2002 census); 4,039 (1989 Soviet census).
