= Ratschings =

- Comune
- Gemeinde Ratschings; Comune di Racines
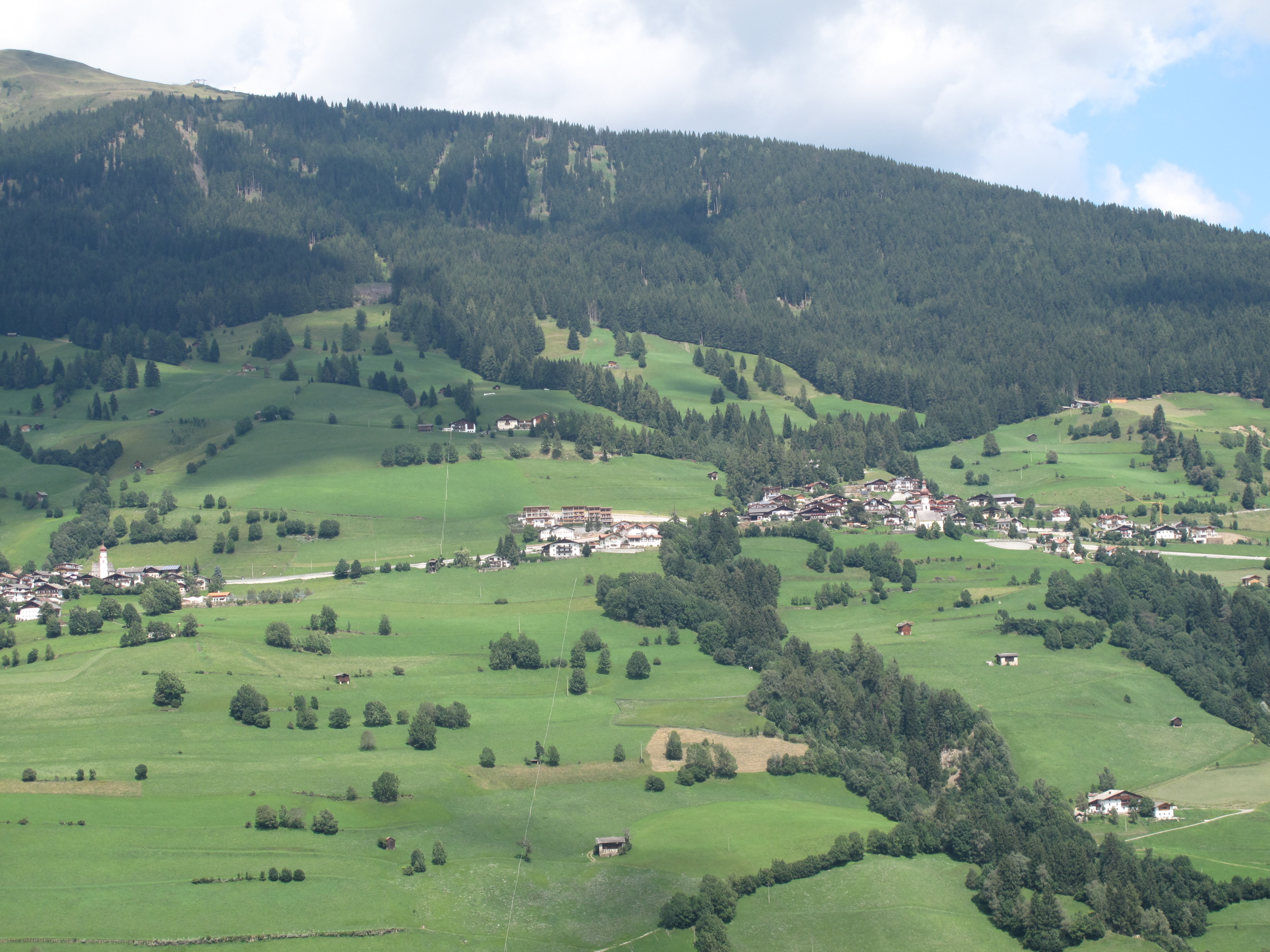
- Ratschings, panorama from between Gasteig and Kalch

- Location within Italy Location within Trentino-Alto Adige/Südtirol
- Coordinates: 46°53′N 11°24′E
- Country: Italy
- Region: Trentino-Alto Adige/Südtirol
- Province: South Tyrol (BZ)
- Frazioni: Außerratschings, Innerratschings, Gasteig (Casateia), Mareit (Mareta), Ridnaun (Ridanna), Telfes (Telves), Jaufental (Valgiovo)

Government
  - Mayor: Sebastian Helfer (SVP)

Area
  - Total: 203.6 km^{2} (78.6 sq mi)

Population (Nov. 2010)
  - Total: 4,363
  - Density: 21.43/km^{2} (55.50/sq mi)
- Demonym(s): German: Ratschingser; Italian: di Racines
- Time zone: UTC+1 (CET)
  - Summer (DST): UTC+2 (CEST)
- Postal code: 39040
- Dialing code: 0472
- Website: Official website

Ratschings (German pronunciation: [raˈtʃɪŋs]; Italian: Racines [raˈtʃiːnes]) is a comune (municipality) in South Tyrol in northern Italy, located about 45 kilometres (28 mi) north of the city of Bolzano, on the border with Austria.

== Geography ==
As of 30 November 2010, it had a population of 4,363 and an area of 203.6 square kilometres (78.6 mi^{2}).

Ratschings borders the following municipalities: Brenner, Freienfeld, Moos in Passeier, St. Leonhard in Passeier, Sarntal, Sterzing, Neustift im Stubaital (Austria) and Sölden (Austria).

=== Frazioni ===
The municipality of Ratschings contains the frazioni (subdivisions, mainly villages and hamlets) Außerratschings, Innerratschings, Gasteig (Casateia), Mareit (Mareta), Ridnaun (Ridanna), Telfes (Telves), and Jaufental (Valgiovo).

== History ==
=== Coat of arms ===
The emblem show a rampant argent wolf on azure. The arms is similar to that of Wolf von Mareit, but with the opposite colors. The emblem was adopted in 1969.

== Society ==
=== Linguistic distribution ===
According to the 2024 census, 96.65% of the population speak German, 3.21% Italian and 0.14% Ladin as first language.

=== Demographic evolution ===
Historical population

| Year | Pop. | ±% |
|---|---|---|
| 1861 | ? | — |
| 1871 | ? | — |
| 1881 | ? | — |
| 1901 | ? | — |
| 1911 | ? | — |

| Year | Pop. | ±% |
|---|---|---|
| 1921 | 2,860 | — |
| 1931 | 2,932 | +2.5% |
| 1936 | 3,120 | +6.4% |
| 1951 | 3,177 | +1.8% |
| 1961 | 3,166 | −0.3% |

| Year | Pop. | ±% |
|---|---|---|
| 1971 | 3,277 | +3.5% |
| 1981 | 3,429 | +4.6% |
| 1991 | 3,594 | +4.8% |
| 2001 | 4,010 | +11.6% |

Source: Data from ISTAT

== Gallery ==
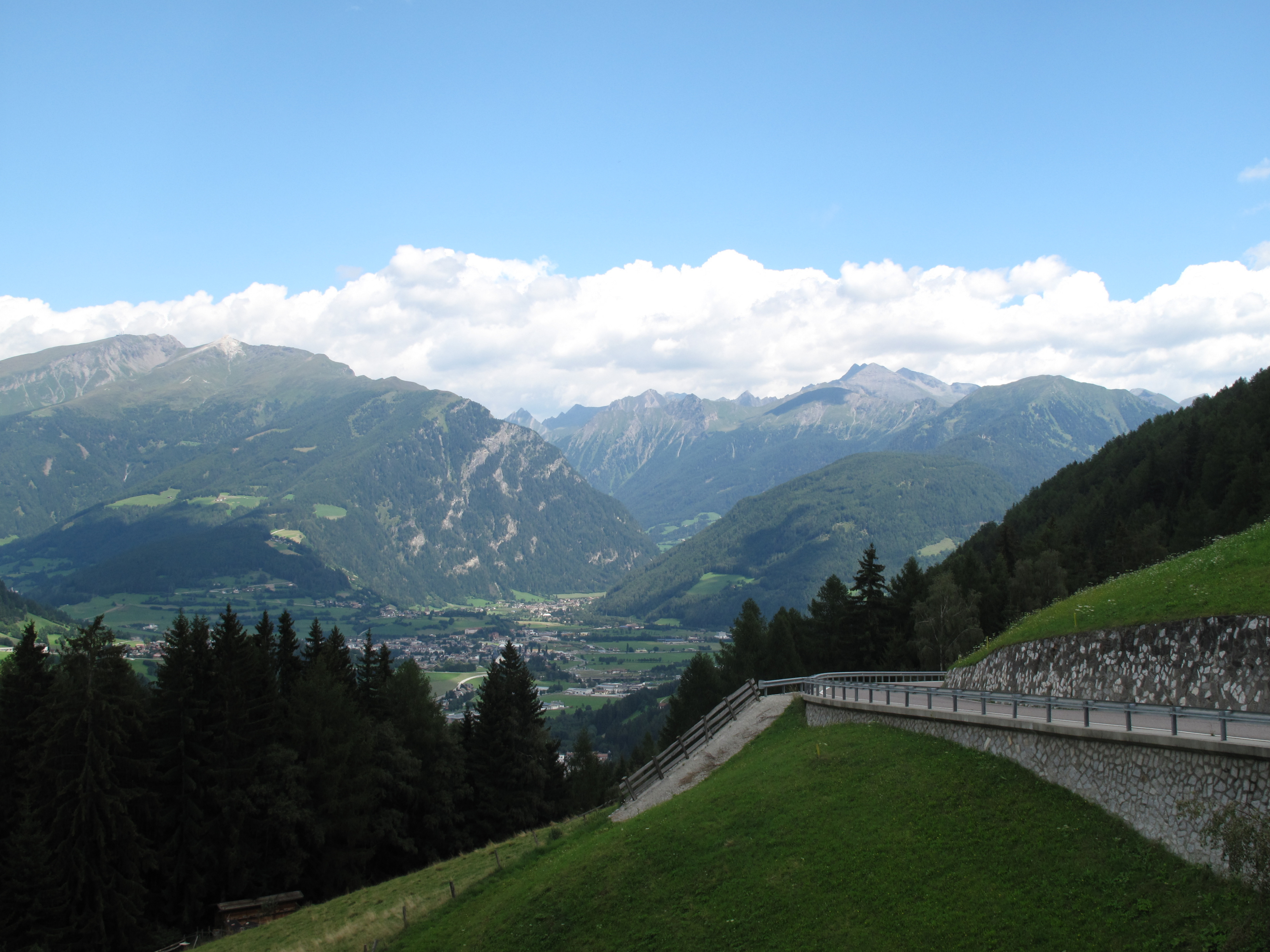
Ratschings, panorama from between Kalch and Gasteig

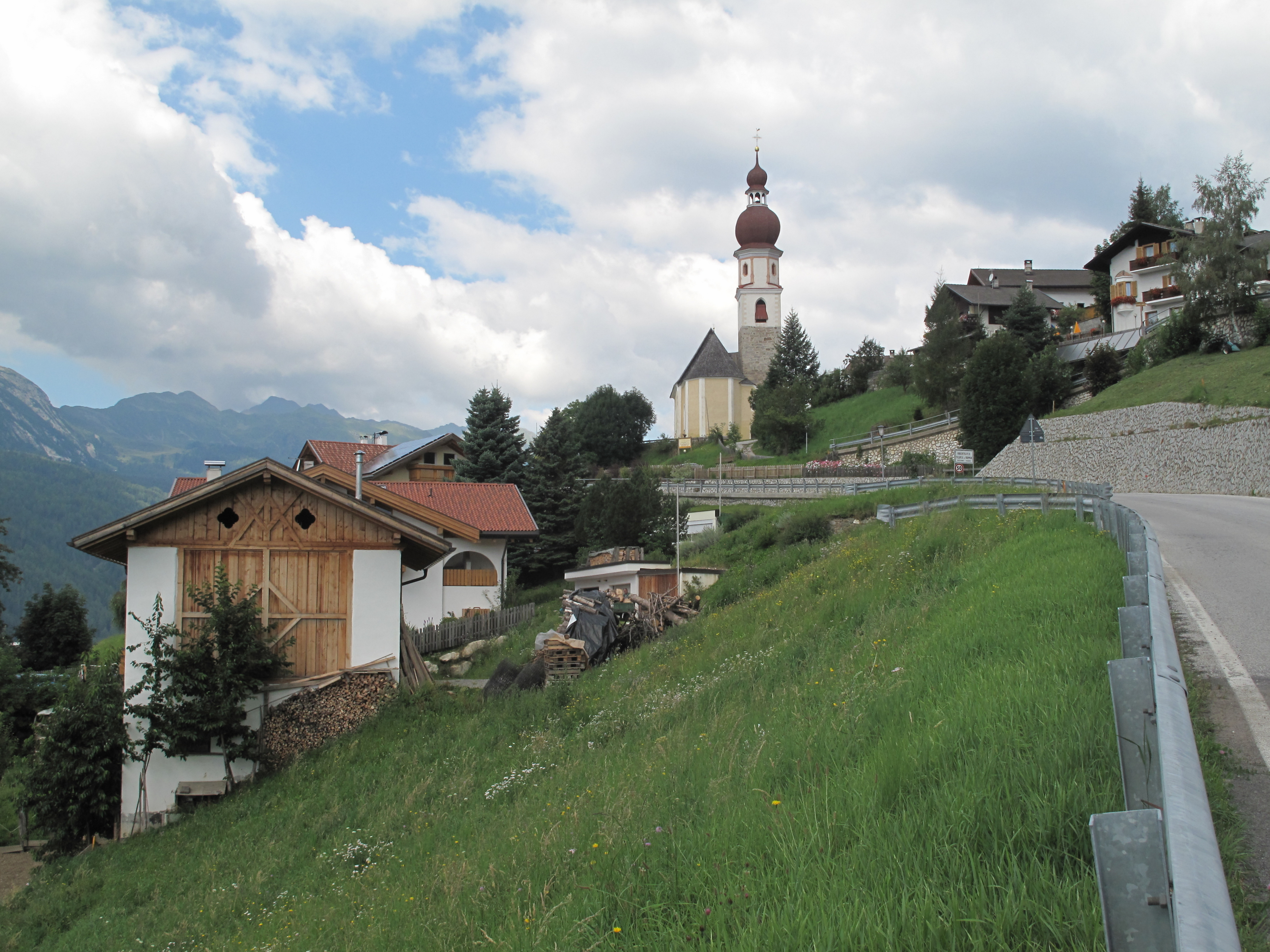
Obertelfes, road panorama with church

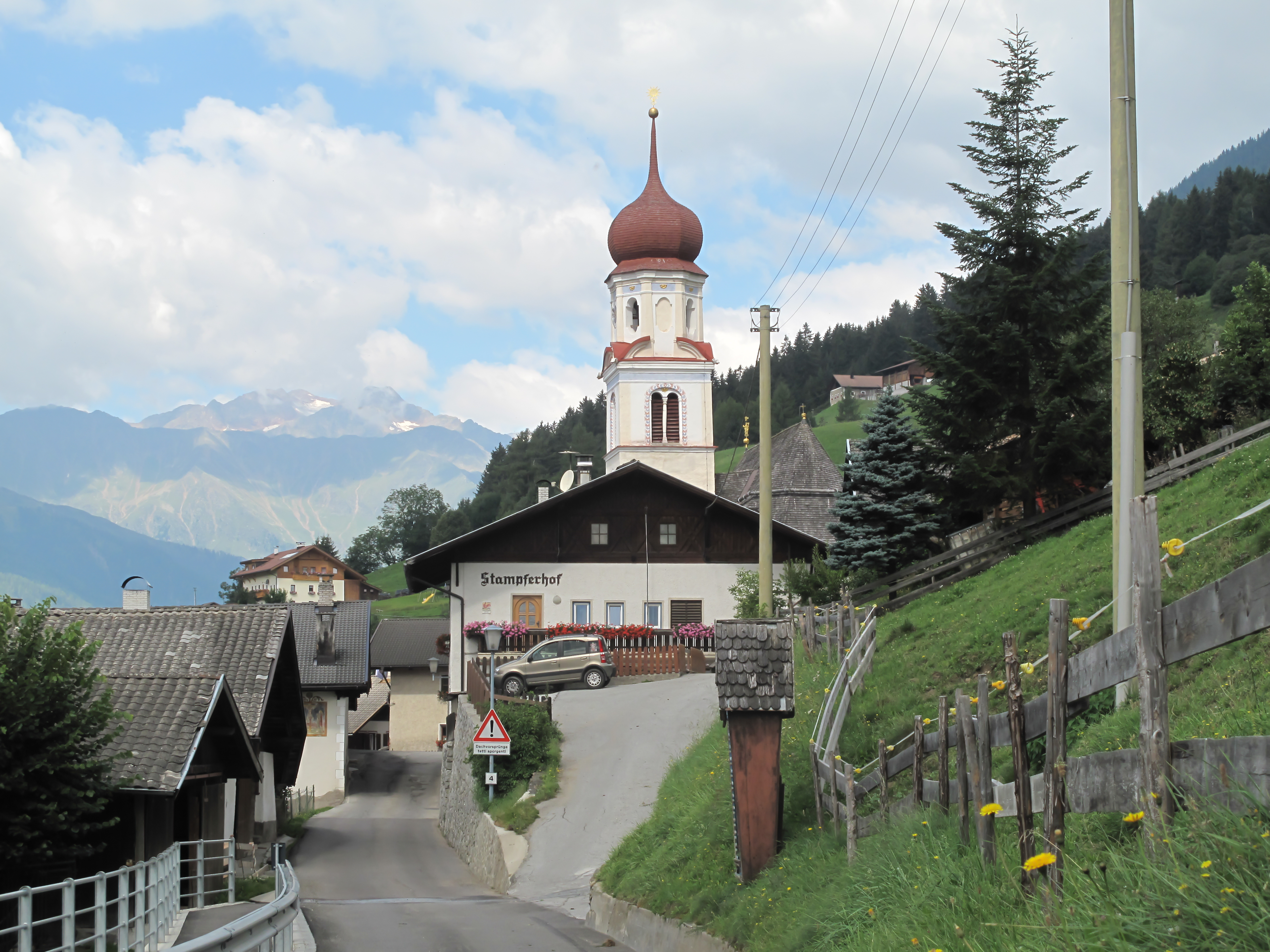
Untertelfes, church: Pfarrkirche Sankt Nikolaus

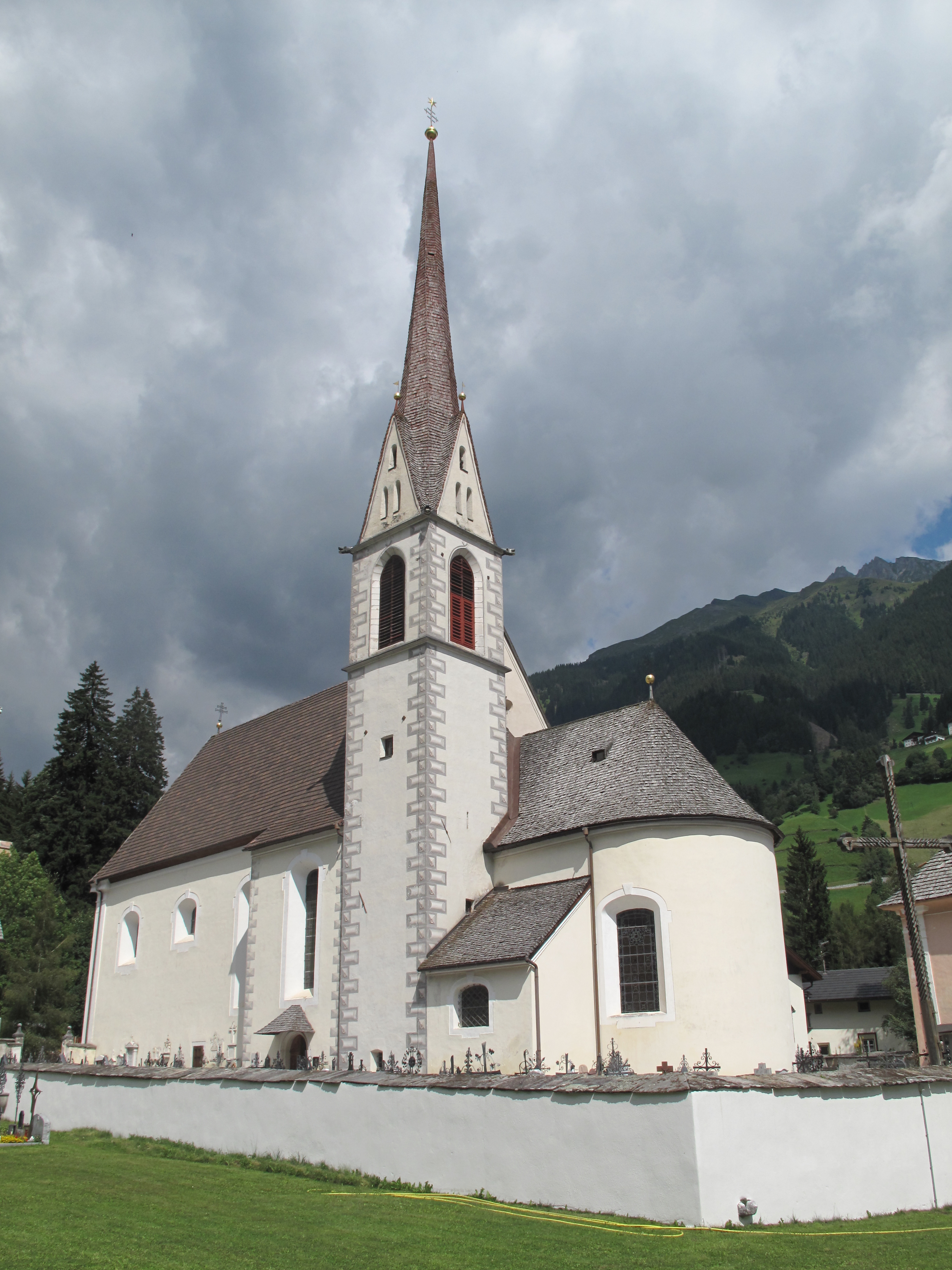
Mareit, church: die Sankt Pankratiuskirche

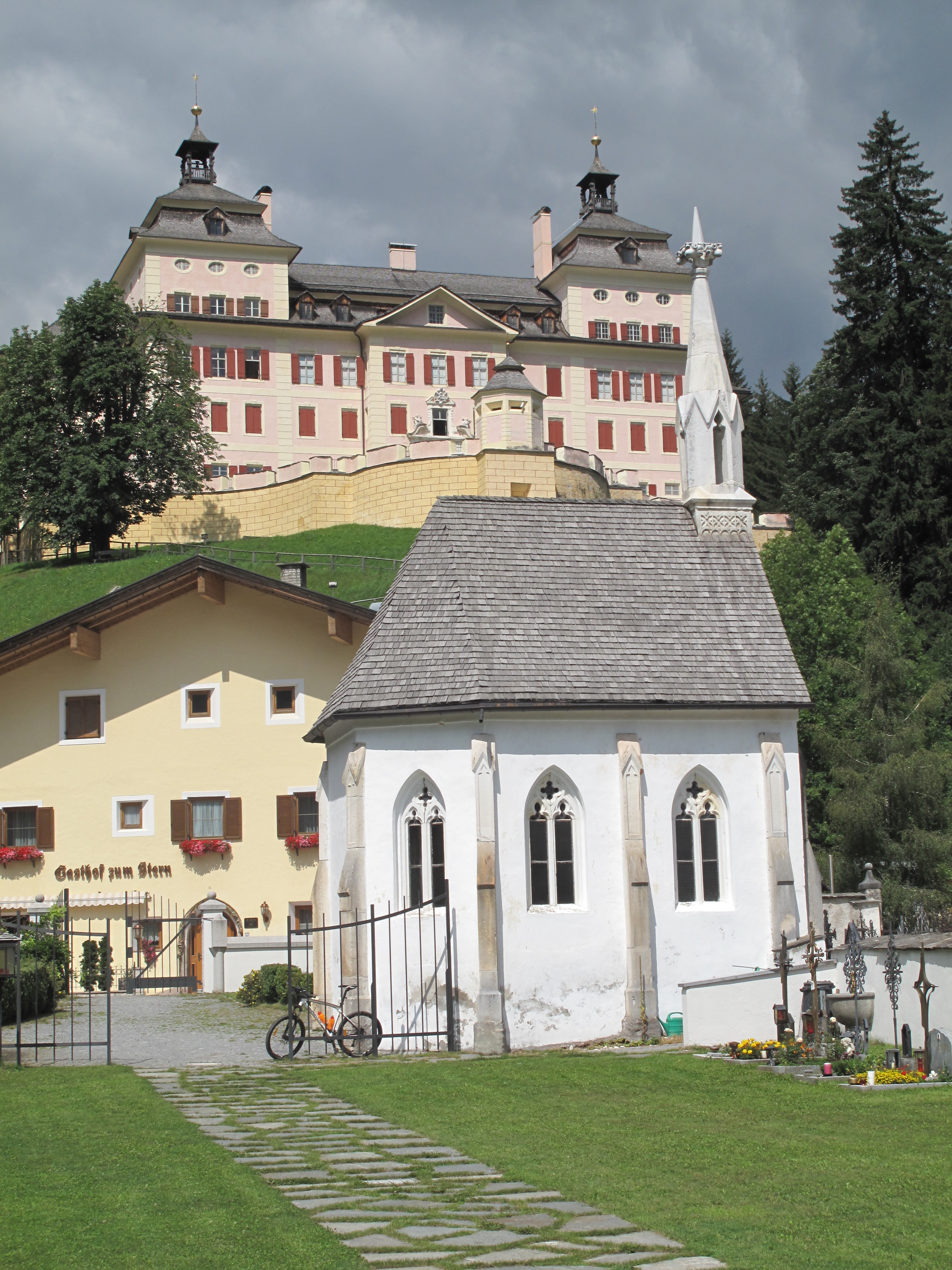
Mareit, castle: Schloss Wulfsthurn

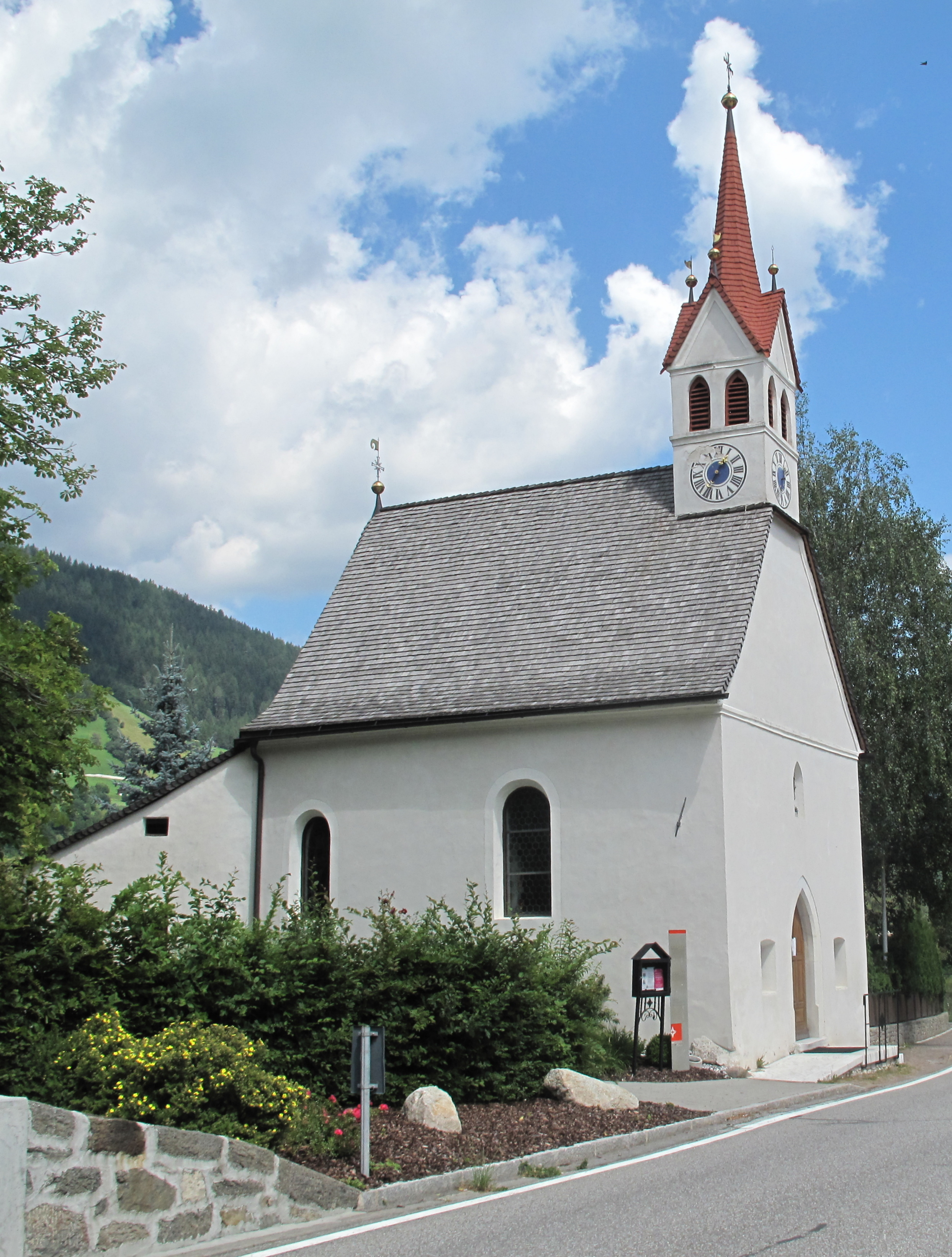
Gasteig, chapel

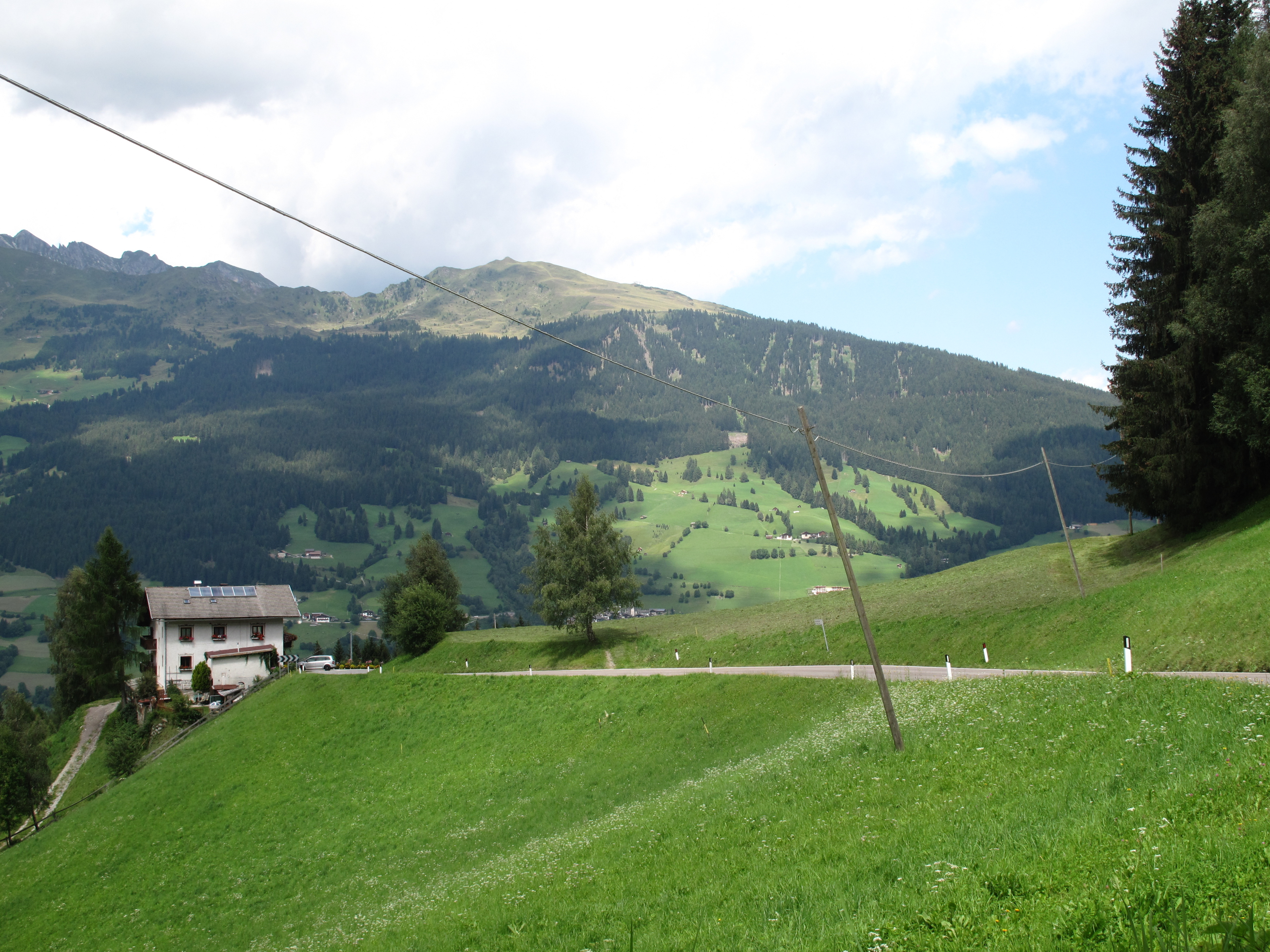
Panorama between Kalch and Gasteig

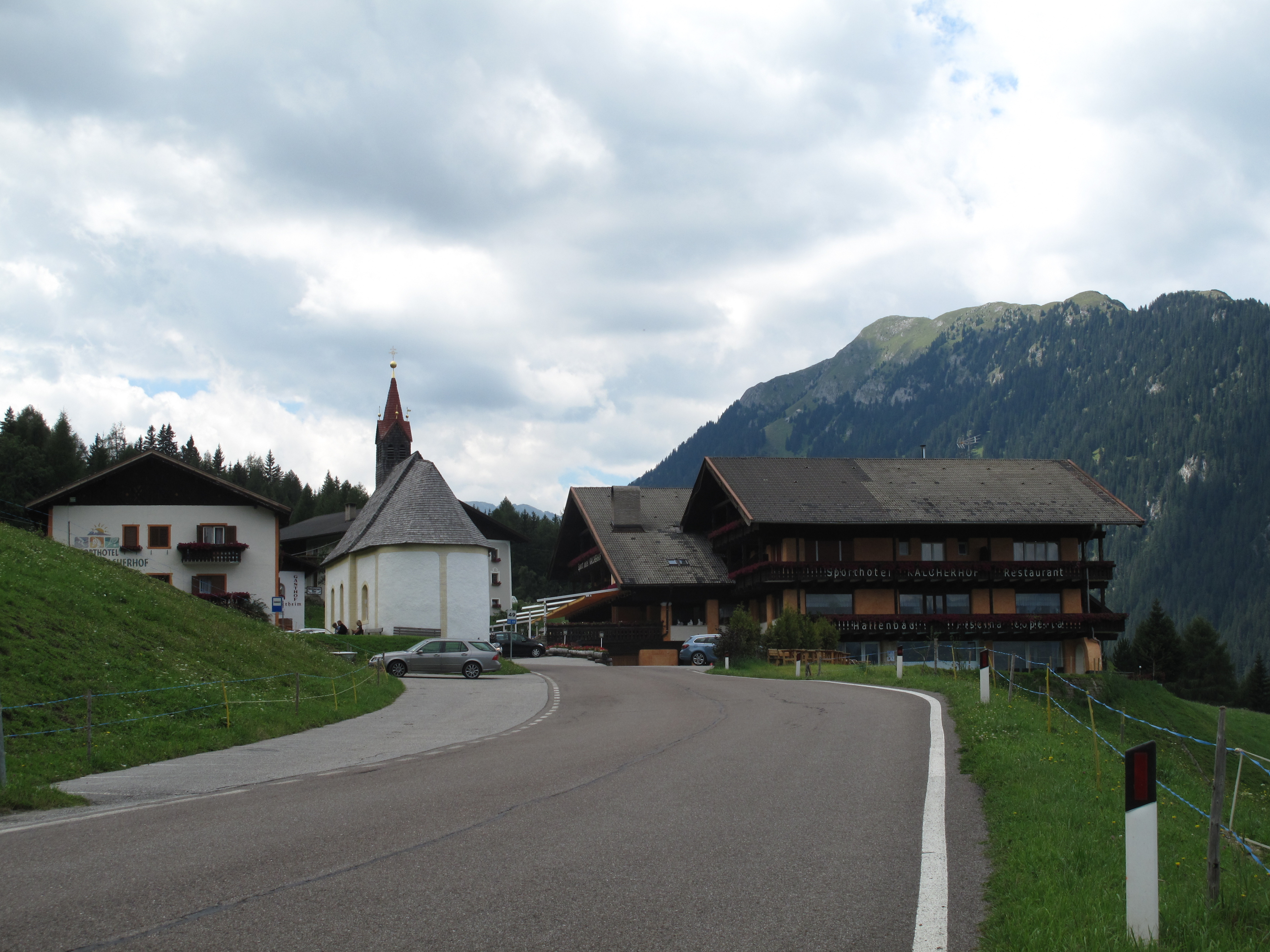
Kalch, view to the village from the road
