= Patrick Côté =

Patrick Côté may refer to:

- Patrick Côté (fighter) (born 1980), Canadian MMA fighter
- Patrick Côté (ice hockey) (born 1975), Canadian hockey player
- Patrick Côté (biathlete) (born 1985), Canadian biathlete
