= 2013–14 Biathlon World Cup – Overall Men =

== 2012–13 Top 3 Standings ==
Medal	Athlete	Points
Gold:	(France) Martin Fourcade	1248
Silver:	(Norway) Emil Hegle Svendsen	827
Bronze:	(Austria) Dominik Landertinger	715

== Events summary ==
Event:	Winner:	Second:	Third:
Östersund 20 km Individual details	Martin Fourcade; France	Simon Eder; Austria	Daniel Mesotitsch; Austria
Östersund 10 km Sprint details	Martin Fourcade; France	Fredrik Lindström; Sweden	Tim Burke; United States
Hochfilzen 10 km Sprint details	Lars Berger; Norway	Martin Fourcade; France	Ole Einar Bjørndalen; Norway
Hochfilzen 12.5 km Pursuit details	Martin Fourcade; France	Emil Hegle Svendsen; Norway	Tarjei Bø; Norway
Annecy 10 km Sprint details	Johannes Thingnes Bø; Norway	Ondřej Moravec; Czech Republic	Martin Fourcade; France
Annecy 12.5 km Pursuit details	Johannes Thingnes Bø; Norway	Erik Lesser; Germany	Anton Shipulin; Russia
Oberhof 10 km Sprint details	Emil Hegle Svendsen; Norway	Ole Einar Bjørndalen; Norway	Martin Fourcade; France
Oberhof 12.5 km Pursuit details	Emil Hegle Svendsen; Norway	Ole Einar Bjørndalen; Norway	Martin Fourcade; France
Oberhof 15 km Mass start details	Martin Fourcade; France	Alexey Volkov; Russia	Tarjei Bø; Norway
Ruhpolding 20 km Individual details	Emil Hegle Svendsen; Norway	Alexey Volkov; Russia	Evgeny Ustyugov; Russia
Ruhpolding 12.5 km Pursuit details	Emil Hegle Svendsen; Norway	Jakov Fak; Slovenia	Evgeniy Garanichev; Russia
Antholz 10 km Sprint details	Simon Schempp; Germany; Lukas Hofer; Italy		Arnd Peiffer; Germany
Antholz 12.5 km Pursuit details	Simon Schempp; Germany	Jean-Guillaume Béatrix; France	Henrik L'Abée-Lund; Norway
Pokljuka 10 km Sprint details	Björn Ferry; Sweden	Anton Shipulin; Russia	Arnd Peiffer; Germany
Pokljuka 12.5 km Pursuit details	Anton Shipulin; Russia	Björn Ferry; Sweden	Ole Einar Bjørndalen; Norway
Pokljuka 15 km Mass start details	Björn Ferry; Sweden	Martin Fourcade; France	Evgeny Ustyugov; Russia
Kontiolahti 10 km Sprint details	Johannes Thingnes Bø; Norway	Martin Fourcade; France	Arnd Peiffer; Germany
Kontiolahti 10 km Sprint details	Johannes Thingnes Bø; Norway	Alexandr Loginov; Russia	Lowell Bailey; United States
Kontiolahti 12.5 km Pursuit details	Johannes Thingnes Bø; Norway	Martin Fourcade; France	Björn Ferry; Sweden
Holmenkollen 10 km Sprint details	Jakov Fak; Slovenia	Evgeniy Garanichev; Russia	Björn Ferry; Sweden
Holmenkollen 12.5 km Pursuit details	Simon Eder; Austria	Alexandr Loginov; Russia	Björn Ferry; Sweden
Holmenkollen 15 km Mass start details	Martin Fourcade; France	Dominik Landertinger; Austria	Jakov Fak; Slovenia

== Standings ==
#	Name	ÖST IN	ÖST SP	HOC SP	HOC PU	ANN SP	ANN PU	OBE SP	OBE PU	OBE MS	RUH IN	RUH PU	ANT SP	ANT PU	POK SP	POK PU	POK MS	KON SP	KON SP	KON PU	HOL SP	HOL PU	HOL MS	Total
1.	Martin Fourcade (FRA)	60	60	54	60	48	24	48	48	60	—	—	40	32	36	36	54	54	30	54	30	40	60	928
2	Emil Hegle Svendsen (NOR)	23	30	36	54	—	—	60	60	30	60	60	—	—	8	21	43	34	38	0	31	21	27	636
3	Johannes Thingnes Bø (NOR)	14	32	—	—	60	60	31	38	23	34	23	—	—	11	14	40	60	60	60	23	29	19	631
4	Dominik Landertinger (AUT)	17	31	14	~~2~~	27	19	32	32	38	40	36	43	34	40	40	17	19	26	34	18	~~8~~	54	611
5	Simon Eder (AUT)	54	34	23	18	20	28	27	18	~~0~~	25	43	~~8~~	20	21	34	26	25	28	14	38	60	22	578
6	Ole Einar Bjørndalen (NOR)	10	29	48	40	—	—	54	54	20	—	—	21	43	38	48	32	40	1	—	29	9	40	556
7	Arnd Peiffer (GER)	3	40	30	30	1	~~0~~	34	29	—	11	3	48	40	48	22	24	48	16	29	21	36	34	547
8	Anton Shipulin (RUS)	—	20	27	24	31	48	28	36	29	21	15	27	—	54	60	—	29	8	26	8	25	28	544
9	Björn Ferry (SWE)	2	1	2	5	12	21	—	—	—	26	19	38	38	60	54	60	17	25	48	48	48	18	542
10	Simon Schempp (GER)	—	0	34	38	40	22	16	19	19	32	30	60	60	—	—	15	31	20	32	10	17	26	521
11	Dmitry Malyshko (RUS)	0	17	26	29	43	27	16	26	31	38	32	—	—	43	43	23	43	32	22	56	—	17	508
12	Jakov Fak (SLO)	0	13	19	25	—	—	—	—	—	43	54	30	24	26	38	22	16	24	16	60	34	48	492
13	Jean-Guillaume Béatrix (FRA)	16	43	22	31	5	7	1	22	24	~~0~~	—	36	54	31	19	38	26	18	8	27	19	31	478
14	Lukas Hofer (ITA)	38	24	0	—	36	31	10	3	36	0	~~0~~	60	21	34	20	12	22	36	25	5	22	30	465
15	Ondřej Moravec (CZE)	36	4	~~0~~	~~0~~	54	29	12	27	40	12	26	24	28	15	7	29	38	43	0	13	12	16	465
16	Andrejs Rastorgujevs (LAT)	0	0	15	32	8	9	13	43	27	23	22	—	—	32	32	30	30	0	38	40	14	36	445
17	Fredrik Lindström (SWE)	7	54	20	13	34	23	—	—	26	22	21	0	3	27	29	25	36	12	28	9	28	21	438
18	Evgeny Ustyugov (RUS)	28	38	24	43	—	—	43	31	17	48	28	—	—	28	27	48	18	3	10	0	0	—	434
19	Lowell Bailey (USA)	22	27	25	11	6	26	—	—	—	16	20	22	29	29	31	21	12	48	27	22	27	13	434
20	Alexandr Loginov (RUS)	26	0	0	—	24	38	22	16	34	20	27	0	—	0	—	31	2	54	17	43	54	14	422
21	Simon Desthieux (FRA)	20	23	16	12	11	15	20	24	28	18	10	2	19	~~0~~	8	28	~~0~~	23	23	36	6	43	385
22	Alexey Volkov (RUS)	21	0	8	22	16	18	36	23	54	54	24	—	—	10	12	16	—	—	—	17	38	0	369
23	Serhiy Semenov (UKR)	30	14	32	23	0	0	24	0	18	27	16	—	—	9	11	27	21	10	9	26	30	25	352
24	Daniel Böhm (GER)	40	26	31	28	—	—	17	21	16	19	18	0	8	16	25	34	—	—	—	17	23	12	351
25	Tim Burke (USA)	0	48	17	20	13	25	0	—	32	0	7	0	—	25	28	36	6	22	24	0	—	32	335
26	Evgeniy Garanichev (RUS)	0	—	18	7	18	32	0	0	—	30	48	12	16	0	0	—	5	9	11	54	32	38	330
27	Lars Berger (NOR)	—	—	60	27	29	20	—	—	—	—	—	—	—	—	—	—	23	15	18	36	20	23	271
28	Erik Lesser (GER)	31	36	0	—	32	54	—	—	21	2	12	23	25	—	—	—	28	0	4	0	3	—	271
29	Tarjei Bø (NOR)	4	11	43	48	—	—	9	28	48	4	38	—	—	12	18	—	—	—	—	—	—	—	263
30	Christoph Sumann (AUT)	—	—	40	36	22	17	—	—	—	14	34	4	12	—	—	—	14	0	30	20	18	—	261
#	Name	ÖST IN	ÖST SP	HOC SP	HOC PU	ANN SP	ANN PU	OBE SP	OBE PU	OBE MS	RUH IN	RUH PU	ANT SP	ANT PU	POK SP	POK PU	POK MS	KON SP	KON SP	KON PU	HOL SP	HOL PU	HOL MS	Total
31	Jaroslav Soukup (CZE)	0	15	11	1	0	0	0	11	—	31	29	0	—	22	30	18	10	0	0	32	31	20	261
32	Nathan Smith (CAN)	25	0	0	14	25	34	—	—	—	1	25	19	15	0	5	—	20	34	31	0	0	—	248
33	Klemen Bauer (SLO)	32	19	0	—	0	3	19	17	—	0	0	0	—	24	23	14	24	29	40	0	—	—	244
34	Daniel Mesotitsch (AUT)	48	0	22	8	38	30	—	—	—	0	5	0	4	0	6	—	0	21	15	15	26	—	228
35	Carl Johan Bergman (SWE)	0	2	0	0	14	43	—	—	—	—	—	—	—	0	9	—	9	40	12	24	43	24	220
36	Friedrich Pinter (AUT)	27	0	0	—	26	16	—	—	—	0	—	28	13	30	26	13	8	17	0	1	4	—	209
37	Benjamin Weger (SUI)	0	0	0	15	30	40	30	34	14	7	0	0	5	—	—	—	27	0	0	0	2	—	204
38	Christoph Stephan (GER)	15	25	—	—	19	36	23	30	25	0	—	29	—	—	—	—	—	—	—	0	1	—	203
39	Simon Fourcade (FRA)	29	6	0	—	0	0	7	20	—	36	40	26	31	0	0	—	—	0	—	—	—	—	195
40	Alexis Bœuf (FRA)	12	8	13	34	21	11	14	14	0	28	31	0	—	—	—	—	—	—	—	—	—	—	186
41	Andreas Birnbacher (GER)	—	—	8	26	0	14	21	25	43	3	17	0	14	—	—	—	—	—	—	—	—	—	171
42	Brendan Green (CAN)	—	—	10	0	—	—	—	—	—	—	—	34	23	20	15	20	15	13	21	0	0	—	171
43	Henrik L'Abée-Lund (NOR)	9	0	9	4	28	12	0	12	—	0	4	31	48	3	—	—	—	—	—	—	—	—	160
44	Krasimir Anev (BUL)	1	0	0	6	0	—	—	—	—	0	0	32	36	23	24	—	0	11	20	0	—	—	153
45	Florian Graf (GER)	0	21	29	21	23	0	—	—	—	—	—	—	—	4	1	—	13	5	2	14	5	—	138
46	Dominik Windisch (ITA)	0	0	12	16	0	0	0	—	—	0	—	—	—	17	17	—	7	27	13	11	11	—	131
47	Michal Šlesingr (CZE)	—	—	—	—	—	—	29	40	22	17	14	0	—	—	—	—	—	—	—	—	—	—	122
48	Lars Helge Birkeland (NOR)	—	—	—	—	0	—	—	—	—	—	—	14	—	—	—	—	0	31	43	7	26	—	121
49	Dmytro Pidruchnyi (UKR)	0	—	38	17	—	0	0	10	—	0	—	—	—	20	16	19	0	0	1	0	—	—	121
50	Benedikt Döll (GER)	—	—	—	—	—	—	—	—	—	—	—	—	—	0	3	—	32	19	36	12	0	—	102
51	Quentin Fillon Maillet (FRA)	—	—	—	—	0	4	0	0	—	0	0	9	27	0	0	—	1	2	0	28	15	15	101
52	Jean-Philippe Leguellec (CAN)	43	0	28	9	0	7	—	—	—	0	9	—	—	—	—	—	—	—	—	—	—	—	97
53	Andriy Deryzemlya (UKR)	0	22	5	19	0	9	0	7	—	9	0	—	—	6	—	—	4	7	—	0	—	—	88
54	Vetle Sjåstad Christiansen (NOR)	24	12	0	10	—	—	26	5	—	0	—	—	—	—	—	—	—	—	—	0	0	—	77
55	Artem Pryma (UKR)	0	5	0	—	7	0	40	9	13	0	—	—	—	2	0	—	0	0	0	0	0	—	76
56	Christian De Lorenzi (ITA)	36	0	0	0	0	0	—	—	—	29	11	0	0	0	—	—	—	—	—	—	—	—	76
57	David Komatz (AUT)	—	—	—	—	—	—	0	0	—	—	—	—	—	0	—	—	—	—	—	25	13	29	67
58	Tobias Arwidson (SWE)	19	—	—	—	2	0	—	—	—	24	8	11	—	0	—	—	0	—	—	—	—	—	64
59	Tomas Kaukėnas (LTU)	0	0	0	—	—	—	0	—	—	0	0	—	—	18	13	—	—	6	19	4	0	—	56
60	Timofey Lapshin (RUS)	—	—	—	—	—	—	—	—	—	—	—	25	30	—	—	—	0	0	—	0	—	—	55
#	Name	ÖST IN	ÖST SP	HOC SP	HOC PU	ANN SP	ANN PU	OBE SP	OBE PU	OBE MS	RUH IN	RUH PU	ANT SP	ANT PU	POK SP	POK PU	POK MS	KON SP	KON SP	KON PU	HOL SP	HOL PU	HOL MS	Total
61	Kauri Koiv (EST)	0	0	0	—	—	—	38	0	15	—	—	0	0	—	—	—	—	—	—	0	—	—	53
62	Evgeny Abramenko (BLR)	18	0	0	—	0	5	0	0	—	15	13	—	—	—	—	—	0	0	—	0	—	—	51
63	Erlend Bjøntegaard (NOR)	—	—	—	—	0	1	—	—	—	0	—	17	22	—	—	—	—	—	—	0	10	—	50
64	Vladimir Chepelin (BLR)	0	0	0	—	0	—	11	15	—	8	2	—	—	1	2	—	0	4	5	0	0	—	48
65	Matej Kazar (SVK)	8	0	0	—	15	2	—	—	—	—	—	0	—	13	0	—	3	0	3	0	0	—	44
66	Vladimir Iliev (BUL)	0	0	1	0	0	0	—	—	—	0	—	13	26	0	0	—	0	0	0	3	0	—	43
67	Julian Eberhard (AUT)	0	0	—	—	—	—	0	6	—	—	—	—	—	0	0	—	0	0	—	2	24	—	43
68	Ivan Tcherezov (RUS)	13	16	—	—	0	13	—	—	—	—	—	—	—	—	—	—	—	—	—	—	—	—	42
69	Alexander Os (NOR)	—	—	—	—	0	6	—	—	—	—	—	15	17	—	—	—	—	—	—	—	—	—	38
70	Pavol Hurajt (SVK)	0	18	0	—	4	0	—	—	—	13	0	0	—	—	—	—	—	—	—	—	—	—	35
71	Magnus Jonsson (SWE)	—	0	—	—	—	—	25	8	—	0	—	0	—	—	—	—	—	—	—	—	—	—	33
72	Alexey Slepov (RUS)	—	—	—	—	—	—	—	—	—	—	—	1	6	—	—	—	—	—	—	19	7	—	33
73	Jarkko Kauppinen (FIN)	0	0	0	—	0	0	0	—	—	0	—	20	11	—	—	—	0	0	—	—	—	—	31
74	Leif Nordgren (USA)	0	0	—	—	0	—	0	0	—	0	0	—	—	0	10	—	0	14	7	0	—	—	31
75	Baptiste Jouty (FRA)	0	28	0	—	—	—	—	—	—	0	—	—	—	—	—	—	—	—	—	—	—	—	28
76	Yan Savitskiy (KAZ)	0	0	0	0	0	—	—	—	—	0	0	18	10	—	—	—	—	—	—	—	—	—	28
77	Scott Perras (CAN)	0	7	—	—	10	0	—	—	—	5	6	0	—	—	—	—	—	—	—	—	—	—	28
78	Tobias Eberhard (AUT)	0	0	4	0	0	0	6	13	—	0	—	3	0	—	—	—	—	—	—	—	—	—	26
79	Tomas Krupcik (CZE)	0	3	0	0	—	—	2	0	—	0	—	16	0	—	—	—	—	—	—	—	—	—	21
80	Tomáš Hasilla (SVK)	0	0	0	0	9	0	0	0	—	—	—	—	—	7	4	—	0	0	—	0	0	—	20
81	Janez Marič (SLO)	0	0	0	—	0	—	18	0	—	0	—	0	—	0	0	—	—	—	—	—	—	—	18
82	Andrei Makoveev (RUS)	—	—	—	—	—	—	—	—	—	—	—	0	18	—	—	—	—	—	—	—	—	—	18
83	Markus Windisch (ITA)	—	—	0	—	0	0	3	0	—	0	1	5	9	—	—	—	—	—	—	—	—	—	18
84	Michal Krčmář (CZE)	—	—	0	0	17	0	0	—	—	0	0	0	—	0	0	—	0	0	—	0	0	—	17
85	Aliaksandr Darozhka (BLR)	—	—	—	—	—	—	0	2	—	0	—	0	0	14	0	—	0	—	—	0	—	—	16
86	Milanko Petrović (SRB)	0	10	0	—	—	—	0	0	—	6	0	0	—	—	—	—	—	—	—	—	—	—	16
87	Serafin Wiestner (SUI)	—	—	—	—	—	—	0	0	—	—	—	—	—	—	—	—	12	0	—	0	0	—	12
88	Olli Hiidensalo (FIN)	11	—	0	—	—	—	—	—	—	0	—	0	—	0	0	—	0	0	—	0	—	—	11
89	Anton Pantov (KAZ)	—	—	—	—	0	—	—	—	—	10	0	0	1	—	—	—	0	0	—	0	—	—	11
90	Sergey Novikov (BLR)	0	0	0	—	—	—	0	0	—	0	0	10	0	0	—	—	—	0	—	—	—	—	10
#	Name	ÖST IN	ÖST SP	HOC SP	HOC PU	ANN SP	ANN PU	OBE SP	OBE PU	OBE MS	RUH IN	RUH PU	ANT SP	ANT PU	POK SP	POK PU	POK MS	KON SP	KON SP	KON PU	HOL SP	HOL PU	HOL MS	Total
91	Danil Steptsenko (EST)	6	0	—	—	0	0	4	0	—	0	—	—	—	—	—	—	—	—	—	—	—	—	10
92	Maxim Tsvetkov (RUS)	—	9	—	—	—	—	—	—	—	—	—	—	—	—	—	—	—	—	—	—	—	—	9
93	Serguei Sednev (UKR)	0	0	0	—	0	—	8	1	—	0	0	—	—	0	—	—	—	0	—	—	—	—	9
94	Simon Hallenbarter (SUI)	—	—	3	3	3	0	0	—	—	—	—	0	—	—	—	—	—	—	—	0	—	—	9
95	Vitaliy Kilchytskyy (UKR)	—	—	—	—	—	—	—	—	—	—	—	6	2	—	—	—	—	—	—	—	—	—	8
96	Christian Martinelli (ITA)	—	—	—	—	0	—	—	—	—	—	—	7	0	—	—	—	—	—	—	—	—	—	7
97	Martin Eng (NOR)	—	—	—	—	—	—	—	—	—	—	—	0	7	—	—	—	—	—	—	—	—	—	7
98	Claudio Böckli (SUI)	0	0	6	0	0	0	—	—	—	0	—	0	0	0	0	—	0	0	0	—	—	—	6
99	Scott Gow (CAN)	—	—	—	—	—	—	—	—	—	—	—	—	—	—	—	—	—	0	0	0	6	—	6
100	Michail Kletcherov (BUL)	5	0	0	—	0	—	—	—	—	0	—	0	—	0	—	—	0	0	0	0	—	—	5
101	Mario Dolder (SUI)	—	—	—	—	—	—	5	0	—	0	—	—	—	0	—	—	0	0	0	0	—	—	5
102	Sven Grossegger (AUT)	—	—	—	—	—	—	0	4	—	—	—	—	—	—	—	—	—	—	—	—	—	—	4
