= 2011–12 Biathlon World Cup – Overall Men =

== 2010–11 Top 3 Standings ==
Medal	Athlete	Points
Gold:	(Norway) Tarjei Bø	1110
Silver:	(Norway) Emil Hegle Svendsen	1105
Bronze:	(France) Martin Fourcade	990

== Events summary ==
Event:	Winner:	Second:	Third:
Östersund 20 km Individual details	Martin Fourcade; France	Michal Šlesingr; Czech Republic	Simon Schempp; Germany
Östersund 10 km Sprint details	Carl Johan Bergman; Sweden	Tarjei Bø; Norway	Emil Hegle Svendsen; Norway
Östersund 12.5 km Pursuit details	Martin Fourcade; France	Emil Hegle Svendsen; Norway	Jaroslav Soukup; Czech Republic
Hochfilzen 10 km Sprint details	Carl Johan Bergman; Sweden	Andrei Makoveev; Russia	Benjamin Weger; Switzerland
Hochfilzen 12.5 km Pursuit details	Emil Hegle Svendsen; Norway	Tarjei Bø; Norway	Benjamin Weger; Switzerland
Hochfilzen 2 10 km Sprint details	Tarjei Bø; Norway	Martin Fourcade; France	Timofey Lapshin; Russia
Hochfilzen 2 12.5 km Pursuit details	Andreas Birnbacher; Germany	Ole Einar Bjørndalen; Norway	Simon Fourcade; France
Oberhof 10 km Sprint details	Arnd Peiffer; Germany	Simon Fourcade; France	Evgeny Ustyugov; Russia
Oberhof 15 km Mass start details	Andreas Birnbacher; Germany	Simon Fourcade; France	Emil Hegle Svendsen; Norway
Nové Město 20 km Individual details	Andrei Makoveev; Russia	Emil Hegle Svendsen; Norway	Björn Ferry; Sweden
Nové Město 10 km Sprint details	Emil Hegle Svendsen; Norway	Simon Fourcade; France	Martin Fourcade; France
Nové Město 12.5 km Pursuit details	Anton Shipulin; Russia	Martin Fourcade; France	Simon Fourcade; France
Antholz 10 km Sprint details	Fredrik Lindström; Sweden	Evgeniy Garanichev; Russia	Martin Fourcade; France
Antholz 15 km Mass start details	Andreas Birnbacher; Germany	Anton Shipulin; Russia	Martin Fourcade; France
Holmenkollen 10 km Sprint details	Evgeniy Garanichev; Russia	Arnd Peiffer; Germany	Emil Hegle Svendsen; Norway
Holmenkollen 12.5 km Pursuit details	Arnd Peiffer; Germany	Emil Hegle Svendsen; Norway	Evgeniy Garanichev; Russia
Holmenkollen 15 km Mass start details	Emil Hegle Svendsen; Norway	Andreas Birnbacher; Germany	Evgeniy Garanichev; Russia
Kontiolahti 10 km Sprint details	Martin Fourcade; France	Timofey Lapshin; Russia	Benjamin Weger; Switzerland
Kontiolahti 12.5 km Pursuit details	Ole Einar Bjørndalen; Norway	Martin Fourcade; France	Dmitry Malyshko; Russia
World Championships 10 km Sprint details	Martin Fourcade; France	Emil Hegle Svendsen; Norway	Carl Johan Bergman; Sweden
World Championships 12.5 km Pursuit details	Martin Fourcade; France	Carl Johan Bergman; Sweden	Anton Shipulin; Russia
World Championships 20 km Individual details	Jakov Fak; Slovenia	Simon Fourcade; France	Jaroslav Soukup; Czech Republic
World Championships 15 km Mass start details	Martin Fourcade; France	Björn Ferry; Sweden	Fredrik Lindström; Sweden
Khanty-Mansiysk 10 km Sprint details	Martin Fourcade; France	Arnd Peiffer; Germany	Fredrik Lindström; Sweden
Khanty-Mansiysk 12.5 km Pursuit details	Martin Fourcade; France	Arnd Peiffer; Germany	Emil Hegle Svendsen; Norway
Khanty-Mansiysk 15 km Mass start details	Emil Hegle Svendsen; Norway	Arnd Peiffer; Germany	Anton Shipulin; Russia

== Standings ==
#	Name	ÖST IN	ÖST SP	ÖST PU	HOC SP	HOC PU	HOC SP	HOC PU	OBE SP	OBE MS	NME IN	NME SP	NME PU	ANT SP	ANT MS	HOL SP	HOL PU	HOL MS	KON SP	KON PU	WCH SP	WCH PU	WCH IN	WCH MS	KHM SP	KHM PU	KHM MS	Total
1.	Martin Fourcade (FRA)	60	43	60	19	17	54	36	—	28	31	48	54	48	48	31	43	40	60	54	60	60	~~16~~	60	60	60	26	1100
2	Emil Hegle Svendsen (NOR)	20	48	54	43	60	0	~~17~~	38	48	54	60	32	18	27	48	54	60	29	43	54	40	34	23	40	48	60	1035
3	Andreas Birnbacher (GER)	13	38	38	30	26	15	60	17	60	34	31	29	43	60	29	30	54	—	—	25	29	43	43	20	27	43	837
4	Arnd Peiffer (GER)	1	8	19	23	32	0	14	60	36	32	27	54	40	14	54	60	—	—	—	4	24	36	36	54	54	54	736
5	Simon Fourcade (FRA)	28	0	12	15	6	38	48	54	54	43	54	43	20	29	0	23	22	10	31	40	38	54	40	0	—	14	716
6	Carl Johan Bergman (SWE)	22	60	40	60	43	0	—	34	31	9	34	34	4	24	15	22	18	—	—	48	54	—	38	32	34	29	685
7	Tarjei Bø (NOR)	16	54	43	38	54	60	43	—	—	28	21	20	1	19	13	21	32	0	—	24	36	23	24	38	40	32	680
8	Anton Shipulin (RUS)	11	11	18	26	36	0	—	14	32	29	43	60	34	54	—	—	26	31	34	28	48	—	12	14	28	48	637
9	Fredrik Lindström (SWE)	15	19	26	0	4	3	0	30	40	23	36	38	60	43	—	—	14	1	6	38	31	31	48	48	31	30	615
10	Michal Šlesingr (CZE)	54	34	29	29	13	0	—	32	19	0	24	9	27	40	27	32	20	7	17	16	12	38	29	28	38	28	602
11	Andrei Makoveev (RUS)	21	0	13	54	30	24	28	40	29	60	40	31	28	18	18	—	—	26	28	8	22	—	13	23	25	22	601
12	Evgeniy Garanichev (RUS)	31	0	—	11	9	—	—	—	—	18	22	36	54	25	60	48	48	22	40	29	27	—	32	26	16	31	585
13	Evgeny Ustyugov (RUS)	40	0	24	40	27	28	30	48	17	—	28	28	38	22	36	36	38	—	—	11	—	0	31	19	17	16	574
14	Lowell Bailey (USA)	32	40	28	27	24	20	16	0	25	0	20	23	5	20	34	29	27	40	29	21	21	3	16	21	15	17	553
15	Björn Ferry (SWE)	0	15	27	34	31	22	24	19	27	48	0	24	36	23	—	—	—	23	12	36	30	0	54	18	26	23	552
16	Ole Einar Bjørndalen (NOR)	0	32	14	22	40	26	54	—	—	0	16	26	0	31	40	31	24	43	60	20	14	0	34	0	—	21	548
17	Jakov Fak (SLO)	34	0	20	0	19	36	0	0	43	19	0	11	32	32	38	40	36	—	—	30	34	60	—	31	30	—	545
18	Benjamin Weger (SUI)	12	28	36	48	48	14	40	26	16	0	2	18	31	30	16	27	30	48	36	5	25	0	0	—	—	—	536
19	Dmitry Malyshko (RUS)	—	—	—	31	20	0	2	28	23	2	32	40	0	38	19	19	43	36	48	—	—	6	—	30	43	38	498
20	Tim Burke (USA)	0	29	32	0	0	0	—	5	—	0	30	25	29	21	26	38	34	28	30	31	13	0	18	43	20	19	471
21	Florian Graf (GER)	0	21	15	36	34	18	23	36	18	36	0	4	16	26	24	34	23	—	—	7	3	—	—	0	14	40	428
22	Daniel Mesotitsch (AUT)	29	17	0	28	38	0	0	27	34	40	0	—	6	16	4	11	12	0	—	43	43	28	27	0	—	18	421
23	Alexis Bœuf (FRA)	25	23	0	32	28	23	13	0	38	0	25	22	13	34	43	0	15	0	—	32	23	0	26	0	—	0	415
24	Lukas Hofer (ITA)	10	13	25	12	21	0	0	43	13	—	7	15	31	11	—	—	—	30	32	10	28	21	25	5	5	36	393
25	Jaroslav Soukup (CZE)	24	36	48	0	0	16	22	0	22	27	12	10	0	36	0	—	17	0	—	0	20	48	30	0	0	12	380
26	Simon Schempp (GER)	48	6	30	9	25	43	19	22	20	11	8	13	—	—	6	13	25	—	—	22	32	0	15	0	—	—	367
27	Timofey Lapshin (RUS)	—	—	—	18	23	48	25	25	26	0	—	—	—	—	0	7	—	54	26	—	—	27	—	2	0	34	315
28	Ondřej Moravec (CZE)	0	0	16	0	0	0	—	0	—	21	18	19	15	—	23	0	—	14	7	23	26	29	28	12	22	27	300
29	Jean-Guillaume Béatrix (FRA)	—	—	—	—	—	43	29	16	—	30	1	0	22	15	7	17	19	8	16	0	0	—	—	25	23	15	286
30	Klemen Bauer (SLO)	0	0	—	0	—	25	0	31	21	0	0	—	0	—	22	12	—	17	22	0	9	40	20	29	18	13	279
#	Name	ÖST IN	ÖST SP	ÖST PU	HOC SP	HOC PU	HOC SP	HOC PU	OBE SP	OBE MS	NME IN	NME SP	NME PU	ANT SP	ANT MS	HOL SP	HOL PU	HOL MS	KON SP	KON PU	WCH SP	WCH PU	WCH IN	WCH MS	KHM SP	KHM PU	KHM MS	Total
31	Markus Windisch (ITA)	7	0	0	20	11	0	—	0	—	16	0	7	0	—	11	25	11	27	21	34	11	19	21	16	10	—	267
32	Simon Hallenbarter (SUI)	6	0	7	0	7	1	15	—	—	0	0	—	25	13	28	20	16	0	10	17	0	5	—	36	32	25	263
33	Dominik Landertinger (AUT)	43	16	0	0	18	10	20	0	—	13	0	—	0	—	8	24	—	—	—	13	10	26	17	6	36	—	260
34	Simon Eder (AUT)	26	3	22	25	0	27	38	15	11	38	0	—	3	—	20	—	—	—	—	0	7	18	—	—	—	—	253
35	Christoph Sumann (AUT)	38	20	23	17	14	19	21	12	15	0	0	—	—	—	0	1	—	34	38	0	0	0	—	0	—	—	252
36	Jay Hakkinen (USA)	23	2	17	0	0	0	32	13	—	0	10	14	19	—	17	16	—	25	27	0	—	10	—	22	1	—	248
37	Jean Philippe Leguellec (CAN)	27	0	—	0	—	0	34	—	—	24	6	0	14	—	21	15	29	—	—	27	15	0	—	34	0	—	246
38	Alexey Volkov (RUS)	30	0	—	—	—	34	31	0	—	15	23	30	11	17	—	—	28	4	—	—	—	20	—	—	—	—	243
39	Brendan Green (CAN)	0	27	9	7	8	17	1	—	—	22	9	21	7	—	32	28	31	—	—	—	—	—	—	—	—	—	219
40	Michael Greis (GER)	9	25	31	21	22	0	—	—	—	—	—	—	9	—	—	—	—	—	—	15	18	30	19	15	0	—	214
41	Krasimir Anev (BUL)	2	0	0	10	12	9	11	29	12	25	0	—	24	12	—	—	—	0	—	0	—	22	—	8	24	—	200
42	Serhiy Semenov (UKR)	0	7	3	4	15	2	0	18	—	—	—	—	8	—	—	—	—	5	23	19	0	0	—	24	29	24	181
43	Rune Brattsveen (NOR)	36	9	11	13	0	—	—	0	—	7	0	—	—	—	25	18	13	21	15	—	—	0	—	0	—	—	168
44	Lars Berger (NOR)	0	30	34	3	10	12	9	20	24	—	5	0	0	—	0	0	—	—	—	9	1	—	—	—	—	—	157
45	Andriy Deryzemlya (UKR)	0	0	5	0	0	0	—	4	—	0	0	—	0	—	—	—	—	3	0	0	19	24	22	27	21	20	145
46	Artem Pryma (UKR)	0	—	—	—	—	—	—	23	14	14	15	5	21	—	—	—	—	—	—	6	0	17	—	17	2	—	134
47	Michail Kletcherov (BUL)	0	0	2	24	16	0	12	0	—	0	0	—	23	28	0	0	—	12	—	0	—	14	—	0	0	—	131
48	Vincent Jay (FRA)	0	0	0	0	—	32	18	0	—	26	13	17	0	—	2	10	—	0	—	—	—	12	—	—	—	—	130
49	Christian De Lorenzi (ITA)	0	0	0	0	—	—	—	0	—	4	0	—	0	—	30	26	21	0	0	0	4	9	—	13	6	—	113
50	Michael Roesch (GER)	—	—	—	14	29	0	—	24	30	—	—	—	0	—	0	—	—	13	—	—	—	—	—	—	—	—	110
51	Sergey Novikov (BLR)	0	—	—	0	—	0	—	9	—	0	0	—	10	—	0	6	—	0	0	18	16	32	14	0	—	—	105
52	Russell Currier (USA)	—	—	—	—	—	—	—	—	—	0	38	6	0	—	—	—	—	38	18	0	—	—	—	4	0	—	104
53	Daniel Böhm (GER)	—	—	—	—	—	—	—	10	—	17	3	8	—	—	—	—	—	32	25	—	—	—	—	0	7	—	102
54	Serguei Sednev (UKR)	19	0	—	0	0	0	—	8	—	0	14	16	26	—	—	—	—	15	1	0	—	—	—	0	—	—	99
55	Matej Kazar (SVK)	0	0	—	0	—	6	0	6	—	0	0	—	—	—	0	—	—	6	24	12	17	1	—	10	11	—	93
56	Magnus Jonsson (SWE)	0	10	0	0	0	0	—	—	—	0	29	27	—	—	12	3	—	0	0	0	—	0	—	—	—	—	81
57	Sven Grossegger (AUT)	0	31	6	0	—	29	0	0	—	6	0	0	0	—	0	—	—	—	—	—	—	—	—	0	—	—	72
58	Olexander Bilanenko (UKR)	—	0	—	0	0	13	27	7	—	20	0	—	—	—	0	0	—	—	—	—	—	0	—	—	—	—	67
59	Indrek Tobreluts (EST)	0	0	—	0	—	4	0	2	—	10	11	3	—	—	—	—	—	24	13	0	—	0	—	0	0	—	67
60	Vladimir Iliev (BUL)	0	0	—	0	—	21	0	0	—	0	0	—	0	—	—	—	—	0	—	0	—	25	—	1	19	—	66
#	Name	ÖST IN	ÖST SP	ÖST PU	HOC SP	HOC PU	HOC SP	HOC PU	OBE SP	OBE MS	NME IN	NME SP	NME PU	ANT SP	ANT MS	HOL SP	HOL PU	HOL MS	KON SP	KON PU	WCH SP	WCH PU	WCH IN	WCH MS	KHM SP	KHM PU	KHM MS	Total
61	Tomas Holubec (CZE)	18	0	—	0	—	32	6	0	—	0	0	—	0	—	0	—	—	—	—	—	—	8	—	—	—	—	64
62	Daniel Graf (GER)	0	26	21	—	—	—	—	—	—	—	—	—	—	—	1	14	—	0	—	—	—	—	—	—	—	—	62
63	Dušan Šimočko (SVK)	0	24	0	0	—	0	0	—	—	—	0	—	0	—	—	—	—	—	—	26	6	0	—	0	—	—	56
64	Ivan Joller (SUI)	0	0	—	1	3	5	26	—	—	0	0	—	0	—	10	5	—	0	—	1	0	0	—	—	—	—	51
65	Erik Lesser (GER)	—	—	—	—	—	—	—	—	—	0	0	12	—	—	—	—	—	18	19	—	—	—	—	0	—	—	49
66	Scott Perras (CAN)	0	0	—	0	—	0	—	—	—	0	0	0	12	—	14	8	—	—	—	0	0	0	—	0	8	—	42
67	Martin Eng (NOR)	—	—	—	—	—	30	10	1	—	0	—	—	—	—	—	—	—	—	—	—	—	—	—	0	—	—	41
68	Henrik L'Abée-Lund (NOR)	—	—	—	—	—	—	—	21	—	0	0	—	—	—	—	—	—	—	—	—	—	—	—	7	12	—	40
69	Rene Laurent Vuillermoz (ITA)	—	—	—	—	—	—	—	—	—	—	—	—	17	—	0	0	—	20	3	—	—	0	—	—	—	—	40
70	Yan Savitskiy (KAZ)	0	—	—	0	—	—	—	—	—	8	0	0	0	—	—	—	—	—	—	14	5	13	—	—	—	—	40
71	Zdeněk Vítek (CZE)	0	5	0	16	5	0	4	0	—	0	0	0	0	—	9	—	—	—	—	0	—	—	—	0	0	—	39
72	Tomasz Sikora (POL)	17	0	—	8	0	0	7	0	—	0	0	—	0	—	—	—	—	—	—	0	0	4	—	0	0	—	36
73	Friedrich Pinter (AUT)	0	22	0	0	—	0	0	0	—	0	0	—	0	—	—	—	—	—	—	—	—	—	—	3	9	—	34
74	Kauri Koiv (EST)	0	0	0	0	—	0	—	0	—	—	19	0	0	—	—	—	—	0	—	0	0	15	—	0	—	—	34
75	Vasja Rupnik (SLO)	5	0	—	0	—	0	—	0	—	0	26	0	2	—	0	—	—	0	—	0	—	—	—	0	—	—	33
76	Andrejs Rastorgujevs (LAT)	14	0	8	0	—	0	—	0	—	—	—	—	0	—	—	—	—	0	0	0	—	0	—	11	0	—	33
77	Dominik Windisch (ITA)	0	18	0	5	0	0	—	3	—	0	0	0	0	—	—	—	—	0	4	0	—	—	—	—	—	—	30
78	Aliaksandr Babchyn (BLR)	0	0	4	0	—	0	—	—	—	—	0	—	0	—	0	0	—	17	9	0	—	0	—	0	—	—	30
79	Lars Helge Birkeland (NOR)	0	12	10	0	—	—	—	—	—	—	—	—	0	—	0	4	—	0	—	—	—	2	—	0	—	—	28
80	Janez Maric (SLO)	0	0	—	6	0	0	—	0	—	0	0	—	0	—	0	0	—	0	11	2	0	7	—	—	—	—	26
81	Roland Lessing (EST)	8	0	—	0	2	0	—	0	—	12	—	—	0	—	—	—	—	0	0	0	2	0	—	—	—	—	24
82	Jarkko Kauppinen (FIN)	0	0	—	0	—	0	—	0	—	0	0	2	0	—	—	—	—	0	20	0	—	0	—	—	—	—	22
83	Benedikt Doll (GER)	—	—	—	—	—	—	—	—	—	—	—	—	—	—	—	—	—	—	—	—	—	—	—	9	13	—	22
84	Pavol Hurajt (SVK)	—	—	—	—	—	0	—	0	—	0	17	0	0	—	0	—	—	0	—	0	—	0	—	0	4	—	21
85	Christian Stebler (SUI)	—	—	—	—	—	—	—	0	—	—	—	—	0	—	0	—	—	19	0	0	0	—	—	0	—	—	19
86	Yuryi Liadov (BLR)	—	0	—	—	—	—	—	11	—	0	—	—	0	—	0	—	—	0	8	0	—	—	—	0	—	—	19
87	Evgeny Abramenko (BLR)	0	14	4	0	0	0	—	0	—	0	0	—	—	—	0	0	—	0	0	—	—	0	—	0	0	—	18
88	Roman Pryma (UKR)	—	0	0	0	—	0	—	—	—	—	—	—	0	—	0	2	—	11	5	—	—	—	—	—	—	—	18
89	Alexander Os (NOR)	—	—	—	—	—	—	—	—	—	—	—	—	—	—	—	—	—	0	14	—	—	—	—	0	0	—	14
90	Vladimir Alenishko (BLR)	0	—	—	0	—	8	3	0	—	3	0	0	0	—	—	—	—	—	—	0	—	0	—	—	—	—	14
#	Name	ÖST IN	ÖST SP	ÖST PU	HOC SP	HOC PU	HOC SP	HOC PU	OBE SP	OBE MS	NME IN	NME SP	NME PU	ANT SP	ANT MS	HOL SP	HOL PU	HOL MS	KON SP	KON PU	WCH SP	WCH PU	WCH IN	WCH MS	KHM SP	KHM PU	KHM MS	Total
91	Junji Nagai (JPN)	3	0	0	0	—	0	—	0	—	—	—	—	0	—	0	0	—	0	—	3	8	0	—	—	—	—	14
92	Sergey Naumik (KAZ)	—	—	—	—	—	11	0	—	—	1	0	—	0	—	—	—	—	—	—	0	—	0	—	—	—	—	12
93	Maksim Burtasov (RUS)	—	0	—	—	—	—	—	—	—	—	—	—	—	—	3	9	—	—	—	—	—	—	—	0	—	—	12
94	Lois Habert (FRA)	0	0	0	0	—	0	5	1	—	0	5	1	0	—	—	—	—	—	—	—	—	—	—	—	—	—	12
95	Hidenori Isa (JPN)	—	0	0	0	0	—	—	—	—	0	0	—	—	—	—	—	—	—	—	0	0	11	—	—	—	—	11
96	Oleg Berezhnoy (UKR)	0	—	—	—	—	—	—	—	—	0	0	—	—	—	0	—	—	9	0	—	—	—	—	—	—	—	9
97	Leif Nordgren (USA)	0	0	—	0	—	0	8	0	—	—	—	—	—	—	—	—	—	—	—	—	—	0	—	—	—	—	8
98	Mario Dolder (SUI)	0	0	—	—	—	7	0	0	—	—	—	—	—	—	—	—	—	—	—	—	—	0	—	—	—	—	7
99	Ahti Toivanen (FIN)	0	0	—	0	—	0	—	0	—	0	4	0	0	—	—	—	—	2	0	0	—	0	—	0	—	—	6
100	Ted Armgren (SWE)	—	—	—	—	—	—	—	0	—	0	0	—	0	—	5	0	—	0	—	—	—	0	—	—	—	—	5
101	Alexsandr Chervyhkov (KAZ)	0	1	1	2	1	0	—	—	—	—	—	—	—	—	—	—	—	—	—	0	—	0	—	—	—	—	5
102	Florent Claude (FRA)	4	0	—	0	—	—	—	—	—	—	—	—	—	—	—	—	—	—	—	—	—	—	—	—	—	—	4
103	Nathan Smith (CAN)	—	—	—	—	—	—	—	—	—	0	—	—	0	—	—	—	—	—	—	0	0	0	—	0	3	—	3
104	Timo Antila (FIN)	0	0	—	0	0	0	—	—	—	0	0	—	0	—	0	0	—	0	2	0	—	0	—	—	—	—	2
