= Biathlon Junior World Championships 2005 =

Biathlon event in Finland

The 2005 Biathlon Junior World Championships was held in Kontiolahti, Finland from March 14 to March 20, 2005. There was to be a total of 16 competitions: sprint, pursuit, individual, and relay races for men and women.

== Medal winners ==
=== Youth Women ===
Event:	Gold:	Time	Silver:	Time	Bronze:	Time
10 km individual details	Svetlana Sleptsova; Russia	38:25.6 (0+0+1+1)	Vita Semerenko; Ukraine	39:41.0 (1+0+1+1)	Marie Dorin; France	40:19.0 (0+2+0+0)
6 km sprint details	Darya Domracheva; Belarus	21:25.0 (1+1)	Marion Blondeau; France	21:35.8 (0+0)	Anastasiya Kuznetsova; Russia	21:42.7 (0+1)
7.5 km pursuit details	Darya Domracheva; Belarus	26:36.6 (2+0+2+2)	Svetlana Sleptsova; Russia	27:57.6 (1+2+2+0)	Olga Alifiravets; Belarus	28:20.6 (0+2+2+1)
3 × 6 km relay details	France; Anaïs Bescond; Marie Dorin; Marion Blondeau	1:05:35.4 (0+0) (0+1) (0+1) (0+3) (0+0) (0+1)	Ukraine; Vita Semerenko; Lyudmyla Zhyber; Valentyna Semerenko	1:06:06.6 (0+0) (0+1) (0+0) (2+3) (0+3) (0+3)	Russia; Svetlana Sleptsova; Irina Maksimova; Anastasiya Kuznetsova	1:06:24.5 (0+1) (0+1) (2+3) (1+3) (0+1) (0+1)

=== Junior Women ===
Event:	Gold:	Time	Silver:	Time	Bronze:	Time
12.5 km individual details	Anne Preußler; Germany	45:11.7 (0+1+0+1)	Maria Kossinova; Russia	46:15.5 (1+0+1+1)	Mervi Markkanen; Finland	46:20.2 (1+0+0+0)
7.5 km sprint details	Magdalena Neuner; Germany	23:08.5 (0+0)	Anna Bulygina; Russia	24:11.3 (1+2)	Anastasiya Shipulina; Russia	24:23.0 (0+2)
10 km pursuit details	Anna Bulygina; Russia	37:08.2 (1+0+5+1)	Magdalena Neuner; Germany	38:10.8 (2+3+2+2)	Maria Kossinova; Russia	38:31.9 (0+0+3+2)
3 × 6 km relay details	Russia; Maria Kossinova; Anastasiya Shipulina; Anna Bulygina	59:20.6 (0+0) (0+0) (0+1) (0+2) (0+1) (0+0)	Germany; Kathrin Hitzer; Magdalena Neuner; Anne Preußler	1:02:15.9 (0+2) (1+3) (0+3) (0+3) (0+0) (0+3)	Estonia; Tagne Tähe; Eveli Saue; Sirli Hanni	1:03:28.5 (0+0) (0+1) (0+1) (0+1) (0+0) (0+0)

=== Youth Men ===
Event:	Gold:	Time	Silver:	Time	Bronze:	Time
12.5 km individual details	Viktor Vasilyev; Russia	33:37.1 (0+0+0+1)	Mario Drescher; Austria	35:29.6 (1+0+0+1)	Anders Bratli; Norway	36:00.3 (0+1+1+0)
7.5 km sprint details	Anders Bratli; Norway	21:01.8 (0+0)	Klemen Bauer; Slovenia	21:08.5 (2+1)	Oleksandr Kolos; Ukraine	21:50.3 (1+1)
10 km pursuit details	Anders Bratli; Norway	32:49.8 (1+0+1+2)	Martin Eng; Norway	33:50.5 (0+0+3+1)	Arild Askestad; Norway	33:55.3 (0+0+1+2)
3 × 7.5 km relay details	Norway; Arild Askestad; Martin Eng; Anders Bratli	1:06:31.7 (0+0) (0+2) (0+2) (0+0) (0+1) (0+0)	Canada; Marc-André Bédard; Maxime Leboeuf; Brendan Green	1:08:05.2 (1+3) (0+2) (0+2) (0+2) (0+1) (0+1)	Ukraine; Vitaliy Kozhushko; Vitaliy Kilchytskyy; Oleksandr Kolos	1:08:43.1 (0+1) (0+1) (0+3) (0+1) (0+3) (0+2)

=== Junior Men ===
Event:	Gold:	Time	Silver:	Time	Bronze:	Time
15 km individual details	Emil Hegle Svendsen; Norway	43:54.7 (0+0+0+1)	Ondřej Moravec; Czech Republic	44:40.9 (2+0+0+0)	Igor Minchenkov; Russia	45:20.8 (0+0+1+0)
10 km sprint details	Emil Hegle Svendsen; Norway	25:34.8 (0+1)	Simon Fourcade; France	25:55.0 (0+0)	Stian Navik; Norway	26:17.1 (1+0)
12.5 km pursuit details	Simon Fourcade; France	39:12.2 (2+0+0+2)	Emil Hegle Svendsen; Norway	39:42.1 (3+1+3+1)	Stian Navik; Norway	40:30.8 (3+2+0+2)
4 × 7.5 km relay details	Germany; Norbert Schiller; Jens Zimmer; Steve Renner; Christoph Knie	1:25:45.0 (0+3) (0+1) (0+2) (0+2) (0+2) (0+1) (0+3) (0+1)	France; Tanguy Roche; Vincent Porret; Vincent Jay; Simon Fourcade	1:27:14.2 (0+3) (0+0) (1+3) (1+0) (0+0) (0+1) (0+1) (0+0)	Canada; Jaime Robb; Patrick Côté; Nathan Smith; Jean-Philippe Leguellec	1:27:30.3 (0+0) (0+2) (0+1) (0+0) (0+3) (0+2) (0+1) (0+1)

== Medal table ==
* Host nation (Finland)

Rank	Nation	Gold	Silver	Bronze	Total
1	Norway (NOR)	5	2	4	11
2	Russia (RUS)	4	3	5	12
3	Germany (GER)	3	2	0	5
4	France (FRA)	2	3	1	6
5	Belarus (BLR)	2	0	1	3
6	Ukraine (UKR)	0	2	2	4
7	Canada (CAN)	0	1	1	2
8	Austria (AUT)	0	1	0	1
8	Czech Republic (CZE)	0	1	0	1
8	Slovenia (SVN)	0	1	0	1
11	Estonia (EST)	0	0	1	1
11	Finland (FIN)*	0	0	1	1
Totals (12 entries)		16	16	16	48
