= Tagne Tähe =

Estonian biathlete (born 1985)

Tagne Tähe (born 3 September 1985) is a retired Estonian biathlete.

She was born in Vastseliina, Võru County. In 2015 she graduated from the University of Tartu's Faculty of Law.

She began her biathlon career in 1995, coached by her father Üllar Tähe. Later her coaches have been Anatoli Hovantsev and Hillar Zahkna. In 2005, she won bronze medal at Biathlon Junior World Championships in 3 × 6 km relay. She is also competed at Biathlon World Championships 2007. From 2002 until 2007, she was a member of Estonian national biathlon team.

Since 2008, she has been working at Estonian Rescue Board.
