= Martin Eng =

Norwegian biathlete

Personal information
- Nationality: Norwegian
- Born: 5 March 1986 (age 40)

Sport
- Sport: Biathlon
Medal record
Men's biathlon
Representing Norway
Junior World Championships
Silver medal – second place	2007 Martell	4 × 7.5 km relay
Youth World Championships
Gold medal – first place	2005 Kontiolahti	3 × 7.5 km relay
Silver medal – second place	2005 Kontiolahti	10 km pursuit

Martin Eng (born 5 March 1986) is a retired Norwegian biathlete.

He competed at three Junior World Championships, winning a silver medal in pursuit and a gold medal in relay in 2005; and winning a silver medal in the relay in 2007.

After several years on the IBU Cup circuit and the European Championships, he made his Biathlon World Cup debut in 2011 in Holmenkollen, finishing 67th. Later that year, he improved to 11th place in Hochfilzen and in total made five World Cup starts in the 2011–12 season. He briefly returned to the World Cup in 2013–14 and retired after the 2014–15 season.
