= Patrick Côté (biathlete) =

Canadian biathlete

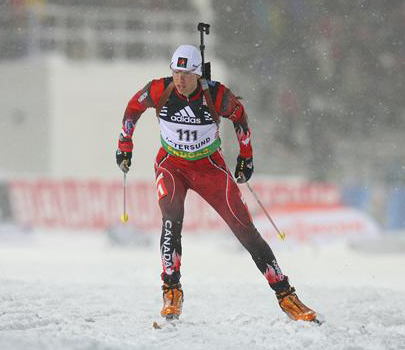
- Patrick Côté competing in Austersund, Sweden, December 2008.

Personal information
- Nationality: Canadian
- Born: 2 June 1985 (age 41)

Sport
- Sport: Biathlon
Medal record
Junior World Championships
Bronze medal – third place	2005 Kontiolahti	4 × 7.5 km relay

Patrick Côté (born June 2, 1985, in Grand Falls, New Brunswick) is a Canadian biathlete.

Côté's first race was in winter 2000. In 2001, Côté qualified for the 2001 National Cadet Biathlon Championships.

In 2002, after participating in the Canadian Biathlon Championships, he moved to Quebec City to join the 2010 training squad, Biathlon Canada Identification Program. Côté is now a member of the Canadian National Team for men's biathlon.

His career highlights include finishing 11th in the men's 10 km sprint at the IBU cup in Martell-Val Martello, Italy, on Friday December 19, 2008.

At the 2008–2009 Biathlon World Cup, Côté finished 64th, a career highlight that includes four World Cup starts and an Olympic criteria performance. However, Côté failed to qualify for the 2010 Winter Olympics and decided in 2011 that he would retire in 2012. After his retirement, he competed in marathons and taught in Calgary.
