= 2019–20 Biathlon World Cup – Nation Men =

The Nation's Cup Score Men in the 2019–20 Biathlon World Cup is led by Norway, who is the defending titlist. Each nation's score comprises the points earned by its three best placed athletes in every Sprint and Individual competition, the points earned in the Women's Relay competitions, and half of the points earned in the Mixed Relay competitions.

== 2018–19 Top 3 standings ==
Medal	Nation	Points
Gold:	Norway	8147
Silver:	France	7598
Bronze:	Germany	7447

== Standings ==
#	Nation	ÖST SR	ÖST MR	ÖST SP	ÖST IN	ÖST RL	HOC SP	HOC RL	LGB SP	OBE SP	OBE RL	RUH SP	RUH RL	POK IN	POK SR	POK MR	ANT MR	ANT SP	ANT IN	ANT SR	ANT RL	NOV SP	NOV RL	KON SP	KON SR	KON MR	OSL SP	Total
1	Norway	180	195	450	397	420	427	420	437	397	420	378	390	438	110	195	210	401	424	210	390	440	420	443	—	—	—	8192
2	France	135	115	399	462	390	412	360	411	452	390	454	420	438	210	210	135	440	418	180	420	426	170	438	—	—	—	7885
3	Germany	195	135	364	339	250	373	390	407	412	360	416	310	408	105	180	165	397	364	195	360	386	310	390	—	—	—	7211
4	Russia	100	165	407	396	330	405	290	360	396	330	342	330	366	95	165	145	409	383	135	330	327	330	360	—	—	—	6896
5	Austria	105	155	270	372	200	348	200	338	316	230	318	360	301	180	135	125	357	363	145	290	361	220	293	—	—	—	5982
6	Sweden	210	180	308	315	310	223	220	339	327	210	325	230	173	100	155	105	373	367	165	220	301	360	371	—	—	—	5887
7	Ukraine	165	85	291	311	290	326	210	340	321	220	370	250	335	155	—	155	346	312	110	200	316	390	324	—	—	—	5822
8	Italy	125	210	346	328	360	338	250	349	219	90	291	200	280	65	115	195	314	302	115	270	314	290	333	—	—	—	5699
9	Czech Republic	70	105	345	345	190	322	310	353	343	250	324	210	284	75	145	180	291	314	90	190	352	200	308	—	—	—	5596
10	Belarus	115	80	298	300	180	248	270	284	355	310	309	290	315	115	125	100	340	257	85	230	341	270	334	—	—	—	5551
11	Slovenia	65	50	300	256	270	335	230	282	227	290	331	270	346	40	105	45	286	340	65	310	289	250	332	—	—	—	5314
12	Switzerland	95	145	309	313	220	294	180	265	303	270	291	160	241	145	110	110	280	299	155	170	70	230	256	—	—	—	5111
13	United States	145	125	165	205	170	269	140	284	323	200	285	220	270	45	100	95	239	346	105	250	242	210	—	—	—	—	4433
14	Canada	110	100	218	188	210	191	330	120	254	180	265	130	260	165	70	90	273	295	125	180	251	180	125	—	—	—	4310
15	Bulgaria	85	75	327	283	230	262	150	187	304	60	239	150	245	35	75	40	278	282	35	210	237	190	248	—	—	—	4227
16	Lithuania	50	35	207	173	120	278	100	207	239	120	193	180	205	60	80	80	283	264	40	80	246	110	261	—	—	—	3611
17	Poland	80	90	87	237	160	159	170	157	194	100	142	190	165	85	90	75	238	306	70	160	260	90	208	—	—	—	3513
18	Estonia	155	70	114	174	150	221	160	179	223	190	157	100	33	195	65	85	174	208	100	110	188	160	274	—	—	—	3485
19	Finland	75	110	177	226	140	209	190	271	166	130	163	170	207	—	95	115	210	153	45	60	212	100	196	—	—	—	3420
20	Slovakia	40	95	165	247	130	210	130	159	140	140	197	70	290	90	55	65	259	207	30	150	132	140	158	—	—	—	3299
21	Latvia	—	40	209	128	60	132	110	175	179	110	203	80	166	135	40	55	167	238	75	100	161	70	216	—	—	—	2849
22	Belgium	—	—	220	211	—	214	120	161	112	80	219	120	119	70	—	35	210	254	60	130	100	120	197	—	—	—	2752
23	China	55	65	96	142	100	106	70	155	139	160	81	140	155	55	50	70	140	169	55	140	195	150	143	—	—	—	2631
24	Romania	45	—	111	119	110	101	60	110	113	170	135	110	167	30	45	30	219	228	25	90	98	130	181	—	—	—	2427
25	Kazakhstan	90	55	141	96	90	166	80	158	255	150	111	60	204	50	60	50	99	105	50	70	129	60	68	—	—	—	2397
26	Japan	60	45	186	121	80	105	90	155	55	—	109	—	190	80	85	60	172	209	95	120	141	—	147	—	—	—	2305
27	South Korea	30	60	96	13	70	143	50	147	101	70	90	90	99	125	—	25	135	134	80	50	83	80	100	—	—	—	1871
28	Croatia	35	—	71	51	—	59	—	—	—	—	35	—	55	—	—	—	55	65	20	—	—	—	73	—	—	—	519
29	Serbia	—	—	—	74	—	3	—	—	62	—	17	—	65	—	—	—	63	68	—	—	—	—	29	—	—	—	381
30	Greece	—	—	—	11	—	25	—	35	17	—	70	—	21	—	—	—	21	45	—	—	55	—	37	—	—	—	337
#	Nation	ÖST SR	ÖST MR	ÖST SP	ÖST IN	ÖST RL	HOC SP	HOC RL	LGB SP	OBE SP	OBE RL	RUH SP	RUH RL	POK IN	POK SR	POK MR	ANT MR	ANT SP	ANT IN	ANT SR	ANT RL	NOV SP	NOV RL	KON SP	KON SR	KON MR	OSL SP	Total
31	Spain	—	—	—	—	—	—	—	—	—	—	—	—	—	—	—	—	27	57	—	—	—	—	—	—	—	—	84
32	Hungary	—	—	—	—	—	—	—	—	—	—	—	—	—	—	—	—	30	34	15	—	—	—	—	—	—	—	79
33	North Macedonia	—	—	—	—	—	—	—	—	—	—	—	—	—	—	—	—	29	33	—	—	15	—	—	—	—	—	77
34	Turkey	—	—	—	—	—	—	—	—	—	—	—	—	—	—	—	—	44	29	—	—	—	—	—	—	—	—	73
35	Bosnia and Herzegovina	—	—	—	—	—	—	—	—	—	—	—	—	—	—	—	—	15	21	—	—	—	—	—	—	—	—	36
36	Great Britain	—	—	—	—	—	—	—	—	—	—	—	—	—	—	—	—	7	17	10	—	—	—	—	—	—	—	34
