= 2019–20 Biathlon World Cup – Nation Women =

The Nation's Cup Score Women in the 2019–20 Biathlon World Cup is led by Norway, which is the defending titlist. Each nation's score comprises the points earned by its three best placed athletes in every Sprint and Individual competition, the points earned in the Women's Relay competitions, and half of the points earned in the Mixed Relay competitions.

== 2018–19 Top 3 standings ==
Medal	Nation	Points
Gold:	Norway	7430
Silver:	Germany	7371
Bronze:	France	7219

== Standings ==
#	Nation	ÖST SR	ÖST MR	ÖST SP	ÖST IN	ÖST RL	HOC SP	HOC RL	LGB SP	OBE SP	OBE RL	RUH SP	RUH RL	POK IN	POK SR	POK MR	ANT MR	ANT SP	ANT IN	ANT SR	ANT RL	NOV SP	NOV RL	KON SP	KON SR	KON MR	OSL SP	Total
1	Norway	180	195	374	382	420	424	420	420	407	420	413	420	364	110	195	210	326	399	210	420	341	420	395	—	—	—	7865
2	Germany	195	135	387	363	330	291	200	387	382	330	383	330	426	105	180	165	401	423	195	390	401	360	443	—	—	—	7202
3	France	135	115	376	423	290	380	270	390	376	360	357	390	394	210	210	135	356	345	180	180	404	390	392	—	—	—	7058
4	Sweden	210	180	399	381	360	374	220	360	342	390	413	310	380	100	155	105	359	393	165	310	390	270	330	—	—	—	6896
5	Russia	100	165	361	392	310	385	390	379	345	270	308	210	376	95	165	145	316	365	135	250	356	310	351	—	—	—	6479
6	Ukraine	165	85	347	387	230	350	330	346	346	290	320	290	332	155	—	155	392	346	110	360	358	330	347	—	—	—	6371
7	Switzerland	95	145	322	350	390	304	360	369	314	310	285	360	343	145	110	110	338	280	155	290	288	230	360	—	—	—	6253
8	Italy	125	210	359	368	200	391	210	317	364	230	400	270	371	65	115	195	370	352	115	220	335	290	367	—	—	—	6239
9	Czech Republic	70	105	381	342	250	371	290	374	340	220	245	160	248	75	145	180	369	360	90	330	334	220	358	—	—	—	5857
10	Austria	105	155	344	341	270	341	180	339	293	210	295	250	378	180	135	125	336	347	145	200	341	210	286	—	—	—	5806
11	Poland	80	90	318	281	190	330	230	287	351	190	331	190	297	85	90	75	294	259	70	270	304	250	321	—	—	—	5183
12	Belarus	115	80	290	287	210	326	190	315	321	250	360	200	267	115	125	100	250	266	85	190	274	170	261	—	—	—	5047
13	United States	145	125	276	229	220	192	250	262	307	200	291	220	320	45	100	95	348	241	105	170	326	180	—	—	—	—	4647
14	Finland	75	110	251	282	150	297	130	265	316	170	284	130	201	—	95	115	235	296	45	210	375	160	323	—	—	—	4515
15	Canada	110	100	295	82	160	208	310	268	231	120	178	120	254	165	70	90	289	285	125	230	261	190	265	—	—	—	4406
16	Estonia	155	70	226	298	180	166	140	277	245	180	215	170	275	195	65	85	287	224	100	0	259	140	230	—	—	—	4182
17	China	55	65	164	199	170	245	170	268	211	160	293	230	157	55	50	70	219	269	55	160	253	200	246	—	—	—	3964
18	Slovakia	40	95	252	189	—	315	—	271	263	—	282	180	252	90	55	65	314	296	30	150	227	120	247	—	—	—	3733
19	Kazakhstan	90	55	213	237	130	164	160	160	139	130	153	150	205	50	60	50	241	276	50	140	182	150	234	—	—	—	3419
20	Japan	60	45	222	202	—	151	—	195	261	150	219	140	183	80	85	60	212	233	95	110	221	100	231	—	—	—	3255
21	Slovenia	65	50	127	185	140	171	150	175	223	140	163	100	112	40	105	45	270	173	65	130	185	130	199	—	—	—	3143
22	Bulgaria	85	75	159	184	110	172	110	166	154	110	209	110	107	35	75	40	224	305	35	120	252	110	121	—	—	—	3068
23	South Korea	30	60	131	125	120	115	120	121	167	100	125	90	159	125	—	25	129	126	80	100	103	90	183	—	—	—	2424
24	Latvia	—	40	120	101	—	148	—	125	69	—	129	—	152	135	40	55	199	216	75	90	97	—	126	—	—	—	1917
25	Lithuania	50	35	52	106	—	125	—	121	100	—	78	—	109	60	80	80	206	80	40	—	177	—	67	—	—	—	1566
26	Romania	45	—	11	—	—	13	—	—	33	—	15	—	27	30	45	30	68	57	25	—	52	—	64	—	—	—	515
27	Belgium	—	—	—	—	—	—	—	—	—	—	—	—	88	70	—	35	81	96	60	—	—	—	76	—	—	—	506
28	Moldova	—	—	43	—	—	57	—	—	27	—	59	—	59	—	—	—	49	61	—	—	—	—	—	—	—	—	355
29	Croatia	35	—	37	33	—	23	—	—	—	—	9	—	—	—	—	—	54	70	20	—	—	—	51	—	—	—	332
30	Great Britain	—	—	—	—	—	—	—	—	—	—	—	—	31	—	—	—	41	77	10	—	—	—	78	—	—	—	237
#	Nation	ÖST SR	ÖST MR	ÖST SP	ÖST IN	ÖST RL	HOC SP	HOC RL	LGB SP	OBE SP	OBE RL	RUH SP	RUH RL	POK IN	POK SR	POK MR	ANT MR	ANT SP	ANT IN	ANT SR	ANT RL	NOV SP	NOV RL	KON SP	KON SR	KON MR	OSL SP	Total
31	Australia	—	—	—	—	—	19	—	—	—	—	29	—	—	—	—	—	35	33	—	—	—	—	—	—	—	—	116
32	Hungary	—	—	—	—	—	—	—	—	—	—	—	—	—	—	—	—	23	55	15	—	—	—	—	—	—	—	93
33	Mongolia	—	—	—	—	—	—	—	—	—	—	—	—	—	—	—	—	19	25	—	—	—	—	—	—	—	—	44
