= 2019–20 Biathlon World Cup – Mass start Women =

The 2019–20 Biathlon World Cup – Mass start Women started on 22 December 2019 in Le Grand-Bornand and finished on 8 March 2020 in Nové Město. The defending champion was Hanna Öberg of Sweden.

== Competition format ==
In the mass start, all biathletes start at the same time and the first across the finish line wins. In this 12.5 kilometres (7.8 mi) competition, the distance is skied over five laps; there are four bouts of shooting (two prone and two standing, in that order) with the first shooting bout being at the lane corresponding to the competitor's bib number (bib #10 shoots at lane #10 regardless of position in race), with the rest of the shooting bouts being on a first-come, first-served basis (if a competitor arrives at the lane in fifth place, they shoot at lane 5). As in the sprint and pursuit, competitors must ski one 150 metres (490 ft) penalty loop for each miss. Here again, to avoid unwanted congestion, World Cup Mass starts are held with only the 30 top ranking athletes on the start line (half that of the pursuit) as here all contestants start simultaneously.

== 2018–19 Top 3 standings ==
Medal	Athlete	Points
Gold:	(Sweden) Hanna Öberg	220
Silver:	(Italy) Dorothea Wierer	194
Bronze:	(Slovakia) Paulína Fialková	194

== Medal winners ==
Event	Gold	Time	Silver	Time	Bronze	Time
Le Grand-Bornand details	Tiril Eckhoff; Norway	38:52.8 (0+1+0+1)	Dorothea Wierer; Italy	40:17.7 (1+0+1+0)	Linn Persson; Sweden	40:17.9 (1+0+0+0)
Oberhof details	Kaisa Mäkäräinen; Finland	39:58.9 (1+0+0+0)	Tiril Eckhoff; Norway	40:29.1 (0+0+3+1)	Marte Olsbu Røiseland; Norway	40:33.9 (1+0+1+1)
Pokljuka details	Hanna Öberg; Sweden	34:14.4 (0+0+1+0)	Lisa Vittozzi; Italy	34:20.9 (0+0+0+0)	Anaïs Bescond; France	34:42.0 (0+0+0+0)
World Championships details	Marte Olsbu Røiseland; Norway	39:14.0 (1+1+0+0)	Dorothea Wierer; Italy	39:34.7 (1+0+1+1)	Hanna Öberg; Sweden	39:40.1 (1+0+0+2)
Nové Město details	Tiril Eckhoff; Norway	34:00.8 (0+0+0+1)	Hanna Öberg; Sweden	34:26.1 (1+0+0+0)	Franziska Preuß; Germany	34:33.2 (1+0+0+0)
Oslo Holmenkollen details	Cancelled due to the coronavirus pandemic					

== Standings ==
#	Name	LGB	OBE	POK	ANT	NOV	OSL	Total
1	Dorothea Wierer (ITA)	54	43	32	54	40	—	223
2	Tiril Eckhoff (NOR)	60	54	—	36	60	—	210
3	Hanna Öberg (SWE)	—	38	60	48	54	—	200
4	Kaisa Mäkäräinen (FIN)	43	60	29	27	36	—	195
5	Anaïs Bescond (FRA)	36	30	48	31	27	—	172
6	Denise Herrmann (GER)	40	40	26	29	29	—	164
7	Monika Hojnisz-Staręga (POL)	—	27	43	43	38	—	151
8	Marte Olsbu Røiseland (NOR)	—	48	38	60	—	—	146
9	Justine Braisaz (FRA)	21	14	40	18	43	—	136
10	Lisa Vittozzi (ITA)	25	32	54	2	22	—	135
11	Paulína Fialková (SVK)	27	21	28	26	30	—	132
12	Julia Simon (FRA)	24	24	30	40	10	—	128
13	Ingrid Landmark Tandrevold (NOR)	29	16	34	25	23	—	127
14	Lisa Theresa Hauser (AUT)	32	—	36	32	25	—	125
15	Ekaterina Yurlova-Percht (RUS)	38	—	20	38	24	—	120
16	Markéta Davidová (CZE)	18	29	31	21	21	—	120
17	Franziska Preuß (GER)	34	—	—	34	48	—	116
18	Linn Persson (SWE)	48	28	—	—	26	—	102
19	Iryna Kryuko (BLR)	20	36	23	—	12	—	91
20	Lena Häcki (SUI)	6	34	27	—	18	—	85
21	Mari Eder (FIN)	28	25	16	—	16	—	85
22	Katharina Innerhofer (AUT)	—	31	18	22	8	—	79
23	Mona Brorsson (SWE)	31	18	—	—	28	—	77
24	Vanessa Hinz (GER)	—	12	14	24	20	—	70
25	Emma Lunder (CAN)	—	26	4	—	34	—	64
26	Aita Gasparin (SUI)	14	—	25	20	—	—	59
27	Olena Pidhrushna (UKR)	22	23	—	14	—	—	59
28	Eva Kristejn-Puskarčíková (CZE)	26	—	8	16	—	—	50
29	Lucie Charvátová (CZE)	30	8	6	4	—	—	48
30	Kamila Żuk (POL)	—	22	24	—	—	—	46
#	Name	LGB	OBE	POK	ANT	NOV	OSL	Total
31	Larisa Kuklina (RUS)	8	2	—	—	31	—	41
32	Svetlana Mironova (RUS)	12	4	22	—	—	—	38
33	Elvira Öberg (SWE)	16	6	—	10	4	—	36
34	Valj Semerenko (UKR)	—	—	—	—	32	—	32
35	Célia Aymonier (FRA)	—	—	—	30	—	—	30
36	Karolin Horchler (GER)	—	—	2	28	—	—	30
37	Susan Dunklee (USA)	—	20	—	8	—	—	28
38	Thekla Brun-Lie (NOR)	23	—	—	—	—	—	23
38	Baiba Bendika (LAT)	—	—	—	23	—	—	23
40	Irina Starykh (RUS)	—	—	21	—	—	—	21
41	Milena Todorova (BUL)	—	—	—	6	14	—	20
42	Karoline Offigstad Knotten (NOR)	10	10	—	—	—	—	20
43	Yuliia Dzhima (UKR)	—	—	12	—	—	—	12
43	Ivona Fialková (SVK)	—	—	—	12	—	—	12
45	Clare Egan (USA)	—	—	10	—	—	—	10
46	Regina Oja (EST)	—	—	—	—	6	—	6
47	Darya Blashko (UKR)	4	—	—	—	—	—	4
48	Christina Rieder (AUT)	—	—	—	—	2	—	2
