= 2019–20 Biathlon World Cup – Pursuit Women =

The 2019–20 Biathlon World Cup – Pursuit Women started on Sunday 15 December 2019 in Hochfilzen and was finished on Saturday 14 March 2020 in Kontiolahti. The defending titlist, Dorothea Wierer of Italy.

== Competition format ==
The 10 kilometres (6.2 mi) pursuit race is skied over five laps. The biathlete shoots four times at any shooting lane, in the order of prone, prone, standing, standing, totalling 20 targets. For each missed target a biathlete has to run a 150 metres (490 ft) penalty loop. Competitors' starts are staggered, according to the result of the previous sprint race.

== 2018–19 Top 3 standings ==
Medal	Athlete	Points
Gold:	(Italy) Dorothea Wierer	327
Silver:	(Norway) Marte Olsbu Røiseland	312
Bronze:	(Slovakia) Anastasiya Kuzmina	309

== Medal winners ==
Event	Gold	Time	Silver	Time	Bronze	Time
Hochfilzen details	Tiril Eckhoff; Norway	29:14.6 (0+0+0+0)	Hanna Öberg; Sweden	29:40.4 (0+1+1+0)	Ingrid Landmark Tandrevold; Norway	29:54.3 (0+0+1+0)
Annecy - Le Grand Bornand details	Tiril Eckhoff; Norway	29:41.6 (1+0+1+0)	Ingrid Landmark Tandrevold; Norway	30:19.7 (1+0+1+0)	Lena Häcki; Switzerland	30:27.6 (0+1+1+0)
Ruhpolding details	Tiril Eckhoff; Norway	34:08.7 (0+0+1+0)	Paulína Fialková; Slovakia	34:55.0 (1+0+0+1)	Hanna Öberg; Sweden	35:03.8 (0+1+0+1)
World Championships details	Dorothea Wierer; Italy	29:22.0 (0+0+0+1)	Denise Herrmann; Germany	29:31.5 (1+0+1+1)	Marte Olsbu Røiseland; Norway	29:35.8 (1+0+0+2)
Kontiolahti details	Julia Simon; France	30:43.5 (0+1+1+0)	Selina Gasparin; Switzerland	31:00.8 (1+2+1+0)	Lisa Vittozzi; Italy	31:04.4 (1+1+1+1)
Oslo Holmenkollen	Cancelled due to the coronavirus pandemic					

== Standings ==
#	Name	HOC	ANE	RUH	ANT	KON	OSL	Total
1	Tiril Eckhoff (NOR)	60	60	60	21	31	—	232
2	Dorothea Wierer (ITA)	32	43	21	60	30	—	186
3	Ingrid Landmark Tandrevold (NOR)	48	54	27	27	29	—	185
4	Hanna Öberg (SWE)	54	DNS	48	43	23	—	168
5	Denise Herrmann (GER)	0	38	38	54	25	—	155
6	Paulína Fialková (SVK)	40	31	54	24	—	—	149
7	Kaisa Mäkäräinen (FIN)	36	22	26	19	43	—	146
8	Julia Simon (FRA)	28	32	18	6	60	—	144
9	Justine Braisaz (FRA)	43	40	30	4	20	—	137
10	Franziska Preuß (GER)	DNS	36	29	36	32	—	133
11	Linn Persson (SWE)	21	30	40	9	14	—	114
12	Vanessa Hinz (GER)	29	—	20	40	18	—	107
13	Mona Brorsson (SWE)	25	4	28	12	38	—	107
14	Marte Olsbu Røiseland (NOR)	24	—	32	48	—	—	104
15	Lisa Vittozzi (ITA)	16	26	0	14	48	—	104
16	Larisa Kuklina (RUS)	—	27	22	18	28	—	95
17	Anaïs Bescond (FRA)	38	—	0	30	24	—	92
18	Ekaterina Yurlova-Percht (RUS)	19	25	0	29	19	—	92
19	Monika Hojnisz-Staręga (POL)	—	—	36	15	40	—	91
20	Baiba Bendika (LAT)	13	14	15	32	12	—	86
21	Olena Pidhrushna (UKR)	26	29	DNS	28	DNS	—	83
22	Markéta Davidová (CZE)	17	13	—	16	34	—	80
23	Johanna Skottheim (SWE)	—	—	43	—	36	—	79
24	Lena Häcki (SUI)	12	48	16	—	—	—	76
25	Svetlana Mironova (RUS)	30	21	—	20	0	—	71
26	Selina Gasparin (SUI)	14	1	—	1	54	—	70
27	Célia Aymonier (FRA)	31	—	—	11	27	—	69
28	Iryna Kryuko (BLR)	15	34	19	0	—	—	68
29	Vita Semerenko (UKR)	6	19	34	2	6	—	67
30	Karolin Horchler (GER)	—	—	24	26	15	—	65
#	Name	HOC	ANE	RUH	ANT	KON	OSL	Total
31	Valj Semerenko (UKR)	27	3	23	0	11	—	64
32	Aita Gasparin (SUI)	DNF	23	0	31	4	—	58
33	Karoline Offigstad Knotten (NOR)	20	28	8	—	—	—	56
34	Elvira Öberg (SWE)	18	5	9	0	22	—	54
35	Synnøve Solemdal (NOR)	—	15	17	—	16	—	48
36	Lisa Theresa Hauser (AUT)	2	11	0	34	DNS	—	47
37	Yuliia Dzhima (UKR)	DNS	18	DNF	22	DNS	—	40
38	Ivona Fialková (SVK)	0	0	0	38	DNS	—	38
39	Clare Egan (USA)	—	12	25	0	—	—	37
40	Susan Dunklee (USA)	—	—	31	5	—	—	36
41	Emma Lunder (CAN)	4	16	6	0	10	—	36
42	Lucie Charvátová (CZE)	11	0	11	0	13	—	35
43	Eva Kristejn Puskarčíková (CZE)	34	—	—	0	0	—	34
44	Irina Starykh (RUS)	—	—	14	17	0	—	31
45	Kristina Reztsova (RUS)	23	—	7	—	—	—	30
46	Kinga Zbylut (POL)	22	0	—	7	0	—	29
47	Elisa Gasparin (SUI)	—	0	—	25	3	—	28
48	Katharina Innerhofer (AUT)	7	7	0	13	—	—	27
49	Emilie Aagheim Kalkenberg (NOR)	—	—	—	—	26	—	26
50	Elena Kruchinkina (BLR)	—	—	4	LAP	21	—	25
51	Darya Blashko (UKR)	—	24	—	—	—	—	24
52	Milena Todorova (BUL)	—	DNS	0	23	—	—	23
53	Thekla Brun-Lie (NOR)	0	20	0	—	—	—	20
54	Chloé Chevalier (FRA)	0	8	5	—	7	—	20
55	Jessica Jislová (CZE)	10	0	—	—	8	—	18
56	Mari Eder (FIN)	0	17	—	—	0	—	17
57	Anastasiya Merkushyna (UKR)	—	—	—	—	17	—	17
58	Tang Jialin (CHN)	0	6	0	—	9	—	15
59	Suvi Minkkinen (FIN)	—	—	12	—	2	—	14
60	Maren Hammerschmidt (GER)	—	—	13	—	—	—	13
#	Name	HOC	ANE	RUH	ANT	KON	OSL	Total
61	Christina Rieder (AUT)	0	0	—	10	DNS	—	10
62	Julia Schwaiger (AUT)	0	—	10	—	—	—	10
63	Janina Hettich (GER)	—	10	0	—	—	—	10
64	Chu Yuanmeng (CHN)	0	9	0	—	0	—	9
65	Kamila Żuk (POL)	9	0	0	DNS	—	—	9
66	Federica Sanfilippo (ITA)	0	—	0	8	1	—	9
67	Franziska Hildebrand (GER)	8	—	—	—	—	—	8
68	Regina Oja (EST)	—	0	—	0	5	—	5
69	Tamara Voronina (RUS)	5	—	—	—	—	—	5
70	Caroline Colombo (FRA)	3	2	—	—	0	—	5
71	Hanna Sola (BLR)	0	—	3	—	—	—	3
72	Lea Einfalt (SLO)	—	—	—	3	—	—	3
73	Anna Magnusson (SWE)	—	—	2	—	—	—	2
74	Johanna Talihärm (EST)	0	0	1	0	—	—	1
75	Nicole Gontier (ITA)	1	—	—	—	—	—	1
