= 2019–20 Biathlon World Cup – Relay Women =

The 2019–20 Biathlon World Cup – Relay Women started on 8 December 2019 in Östersund and will finished on 7 March 2020 in Nové Město. Norway was the title holder.

== Competition format ==
The relay teams consist of four biathletes. Every athlete's leg is skied over three 2 kilometres (1.2 mi) laps for a total of 6 kilometres (3.7 mi), with two shooting rounds: one prone and one standing. For every round of five targets there are eight bullets available, though the last three can only be single-loaded manually from the spare round holders or from bullets deposited by the athlete into trays or onto the mat at the firing line. If after eight bullets there are still standing targets, one 150 metres (490 ft) penalty loop must be taken for each remaining target. The first-leg participants start all at the same time, and as in cross-country skiing relays, every athlete of a team must touch the team's next-leg participant to perform a valid changeover. On the first shooting stage of the first leg, the participant must shoot in the lane corresponding to their bib number (bib #10 shoots at lane #10 regardless of their position in the race), then for the remainder of the relay, the athletes shoot at the lane corresponding to the position they arrived (arrive at the range in 5th place, shoot at lane five).

== 2018–19 Top 3 standings ==
Medal	Nation	Points
Gold:	Norway	249
Silver:	Germany	241
Bronze:	France	230

== Medal winners ==
Event	Gold	Time	Silver	Time	Bronze	Time
Östersund details	Norway Karoline Offigstad Knotten; Ingrid Landmark Tandrevold; Tiril Eckhoff; Marte Olsbu Røiseland	1:11:08.7 (0+1) (0+0) (0+3) (0+2) (0+0) (0+2) (0+0) (0+2)	Switzerland Elisa Gasparin; Selina Gasparin; Aita Gasparin; Lena Häcki	1:11:17.2 (0+2) (0+0) (0+1) (0+0) (0+0) (0+0) (0+0) (0+1)	Sweden Linn Persson; Elvira Öberg; Mona Brorsson; Hanna Öberg	1:11:18.9 (0+0) (0+3) (0+1) (0+1) (0+0) (0+0) (0+3) (0+0)
Hochfilzen details	Norway Karoline Offigstad Knotten; Ingrid Landmark Tandrevold; Tiril Eckhoff; Marte Olsbu Røiseland	1:10:04.7 (0+0) (0+1) (0+0) (1+3) (0+1) (0+1) (0+0) (0+1)	Russia Kristina Reztsova; Larisa Kuklina; Svetlana Mironova; Ekaterina Yurlova-Percht	1:10:12.9 (0+0) (0+0) (0+0) (0+1) (0+0) (0+3) (0+0) (0+1)	Switzerland Elisa Gasparin; Selina Gasparin; Aita Gasparin; Lena Häcki	1:11:08.8 (0+1) (0+1) (0+3) (0+1) (0+0) (0+0) (0+0) (1+3)
Oberhof details	Norway Synnøve Solemdal; Ingrid Landmark Tandrevold; Marte Olsbu Røiseland; Tiril Eckhoff	1:14:11.6 (0+0) (0+3) (0+0) (0+3) (0+0) (0+2) (0+2) (0+1)	Sweden Elvira Öberg; Linn Persson; Mona Brorsson; Hanna Öberg	1:14:32.7 (0+1) (0+2) (0+0) (0+1) (0+1) (0+0) (0+2) (0+3)	France Julia Simon; Anaïs Bescond; Célia Aymonier; Justine Braisaz	1:14:44.7 (0+1) (0+2) (0+3) (0+0) (0+2) (0+0) (0+1) (0+3)
Ruhpolding details	Norway Karoline Offigstad Knotten; Ingrid Landmark Tandrevold; Marte Olsbu Røiseland; Tiril Eckhoff	1:08:46.4 (0+2) (0+1) (0+0) (0+2) (0+0) (0+2) (0+1) (0+1)	France Julia Simon; Anaïs Bescond; Célia Aymonier; Justine Braisaz	1:08:57.1 (0+0) (0+1) (0+0) (0+2) (0+2) (0+0) (0+2) (0+1)	Switzerland Elisa Gasparin; Selina Gasparin; Aita Gasparin; Lena Häcki	1:09:07.1 (0+1) (0+0) (0+1) (0+2) (0+0) (0+0) (0+0) (0+0)
World Championships details	Norway Synnøve Solemdal; Ingrid Landmark Tandrevold; Tiril Eckhoff; Marte Olsbu Røiseland	1:07:05.7 (0+1) (0+0) (0+0) (0+2) (0+3) (1+3) (0+0) (0+0)	Germany Karolin Horchler; Vanessa Hinz; Franziska Preuß; Denise Herrmann	1:07:16.4 (0+1) (0+3) (0+0) (0+0) (0+1) (0+0) (0+2) (0+2)	Ukraine Anastasiya Merkushyna; Yuliia Dzhima; Vita Semerenko; Olena Pidhrushna	1:07:24.1 (0+1) (0+1) (0+2) (0+0) (0+1) (0+2) (0+0) (0+1)
Nové Město na Moravě details	Norway Karoline Offigstad Knotten; Ida Lien; Ingrid Landmark Tandrevold; Tiril Eckhoff	1:09:14.8 (0+3) (0+1) (0+0) (0+2) (0+1) (0+0) (0+1) (0+0)	France Julia Simon; Justine Braisaz; Chloé Chevalier; Anaïs Bescond	1:09:43.5 (0+2) (0+3) (0+0) (1+3) (0+0) (0+0) (0+1) (0+1)	Germany Karolin Horchler; Vanessa Hinz; Franziska Preuß; Denise Herrmann	1:10:11.8 (0+1) (0+3) (0+1) (0+1) (0+0) (1+3) (0+2) (0+3)

== Standings ==
#	Nation	ÖST	HOC	OBE	RUH	ANT	NOV	Total
1	Norway	60	60	60	60	60	60	360
2	Switzerland	54	48	40	48	38	32	260
3	Germany	43	29	43	43	54	48	260
4	France	38	36	48	54	27	54	257
5	Sweden	48	31	54	40	40	36	249
6	Ukraine	32	43	38	38	48	43	242
7	Russia	40	54	36	30	34	40	234
8	Czech Republic	34	38	31	25	43	31	202
9	Italy	29	30	32	36	31	38	196
10	Poland	28	32	28	28	36	34	186
11	Austria	36	27	30	34	29	30	186
12	United States	31	34	29	31	26	27	178
13	Belarus	30	28	34	29	28	26	175
14	Canada	25	40	21	21	32	28	167
15	China	26	26	25	32	25	29	163
16	Finland	24	22	26	22	30	25	149
17	Kazakhstan	22	25	22	24	23	24	140
18	Slovenia	23	24	23	19	22	22	133
19	Estonia	27	23	27	26	DSQ	23	126
20	Bulgaria	20	20	20	20	21	20	121
21	South Korea	21	21	19	18	19	18	116
22	Japan	—	—	24	23	20	19	86
23	Slovakia	—	—	DSQ	27	24	21	72
24	Latvia	—	—	—	—	18	—	18
