= 2019–20 Biathlon World Cup – Pursuit Men =

The 2019–20 Biathlon World Cup – Pursuit Men started on 14 December 2019 in Hochfilzen and was finished on 14 March 2020 in Kontiolahti.

== Competition format ==
The 12.5 kilometres (7.8 mi) pursuit race is skied over five laps. The biathlete shoots four times at any shooting lane, in the order of prone, prone, standing, standing, totalling 20 targets. For each missed target a biathlete has to run a 150 metres (490 ft) penalty loop. Competitors' starts are staggered, according to the result of the previous sprint race.

== 2018–19 Top 3 standings ==
Medal	Athlete	Points
Gold:	(Norway) Johannes Thingnes Bø	429
Silver:	(France) Quentin Fillon Maillet	315
Bronze:	(Russia) Alexandr Loginov	305

== Medal winners ==
Event	Gold	Time	Silver	Time	Bronze	Time
Hochfilzen details	Johannes Thingnes Bø; Norway	31:27.0 (0+0+0+0)	Alexander Loginov; Russia	32:00.5 (0+0+0+0)	Émilien Jacquelin; France	32:07.5 (0+0+0+0)
Le Grand-Bornand details	Johannes Thingnes Bø; Norway	30:07.8 (1+0+0+0)	Quentin Fillon Maillet; France	30:29.8 (0+0+0+0)	Vetle Sjåstad Christiansen; Norway	31:07.8 (0+0+1+0)
Rupholding details	Martin Fourcade; France	31:26.8 (0+0+0+0)	Quentin Fillon Maillet; France	31:44.4 (0+0+1+0)	Vetle Sjåstad Christiansen; Norway	32:02.8 (0+0+0+1)
World Championships details	Émilien Jacquelin; France	31:15.2 (0+0+0+0)	Johannes Thingnes Bø; Norway	31:15.6 (1+1+0+0)	Alexander Loginov; Russia	31:29.1 (0+0+0+1)
Kontiolahti details	Martin Fourcade; France	31:25.4 (0+0+1+2)	Quentin Fillon Maillet; France	31:28.3 (1+0+0+1)	Émilien Jacquelin; France	31:29.9 (0+0+1+3)
Oslo	Cancelled due to the coronavirus pandemic					

== Standings ==
#	Name	HOC	ANN	RUH	ANT	KON	OSL	Total
1	Émilien Jacquelin (FRA)	48	38	38	60	48	–	232
2	Martin Fourcade (FRA)	31	36	60	43	60	–	230
3	Quentin Fillon Maillet (FRA)	32	54	54	36	54	–	230
4	Johannes Thingnes Bø (NOR)	60	60	–	54	43	–	217
5	Alexandr Loginov (RUS)	54	28	31	48	36	–	197
6	Tarjei Bø (NOR)	38	43	36	38	23	–	178
7	Simon Desthieux (FRA)	40	26	43	34	28	–	171
8	Vetle Sjåstad Christiansen (NOR)	10	48	48	31	32	–	169
9	Arnd Peiffer (GER)	28	32	27	40	40	–	167
10	Erlend Bjøntegaard (NOR)	24	34	25	26	38	–	147
11	Benedikt Doll (GER)	27	40	40	12	22	–	141
12	Johannes Dale (NOR)	26	29	32	24	–	–	111
13	Lukas Hofer (ITA)	36	17	–	21	31	–	105
14	Fabien Claude (FRA)	34	7	26	–	29	–	96
15	Jakov Fak (SLO)	43	–	28	20	3	–	94
16	Johannes Kühn (GER)	29	18	17	13	13	–	90
17	Julian Eberhard (AUT)	19	25	16	27	–	–	87
18	Artem Pryma (UKR)	0	14	30	17	24	–	85
19	Dmytro Pidruchnyi (UKR)	25	21	DNF	11	25	–	82
20	Philipp Horn (GER)	23	30	4	23	0	–	80
21	Michal Krčmář (CZE)	12	27	20	14	5	–	78
22	Martin Ponsiluoma (SWE)	0	22	0	18	34	–	74
23	Dominik Windisch (ITA)	20	24	8	0	19	–	71
24	Antonin Guigonnat (FRA)	15	0	34	–	21	–	70
25	Evgeniy Garanichev (RUS)	7	5	19	7	26	–	64
26	Sebastian Samuelsson (SWE)	0	2	24	22	14	–	62
27	Matvey Eliseev (RUS)	30	11	18	0	0	–	59
28	Felix Leitner (AUT)	21	0	5	32	DNS	–	58
29	Ondřej Moravec (CZE)	0	–	23	19	12	–	54
30	Jesper Nelin (SWE)	–	1	2	30	18	–	51
#	Name	HOC	ANN	RUH	ANT	KON	OSL	Total
31	Andrejs Rastorgujevs (LAT)	22	8	15	–	6	–	51
32	Simon Schempp (GER)	13	31	–	–	0	–	44
33	Simon Eder (AUT)	–	15	–	29	–	–	44
34	Timofey Lapshin (KOR)	5	20	DNF	0	17	–	42
35	Rok Trsan (SLO)	–	16	10	16	0	–	42
36	Florent Claude (BEL)	1	19	0	9	4	–	33
37	Anton Dudchenko (UKR)	9	12	12	0	–	–	33
38	Peppe Femling (SWE)	–	6	0	25	–	–	31
39	Vladimir Iliev (BUL)	8	23	–	0	DNS	–	31
40	Tero Seppälä (FIN)	17	4	0	0	10	–	31
41	Sturla Holm Laegreid (NOR)	–	–	–	–	30	–	30
42	Anton Smolski (BLR)	–	–	0	3	27	–	30
43	Mikita Labastau (BLR)	2	13	11	4	–	–	30
44	Philipp Nawrath (GER)	–	–	29	–	–	–	29
45	Krasimir Anev (BUL)	–	–	–	28	DNS	–	28
46	Aleksander Fjeld Andersen (NOR)	14	–	13	–	–	–	27
47	Thomas Bormolini (ITA)	–	9	0	0	15	–	24
48	Roman Rees (GER)	–	–	22	–	–	–	22
49	Lars Helge Birkeland (NOR)	–	–	21	–	–	–	21
50	Klemen Bauer (SLO)	DSQ	0	0	–	20	–	20
51	Thierry Langer (BEL)	18	–	0	–	0	–	18
52	Vytautas Strolia (LTU)	0	–	DNS	10	8	–	18
53	Dmitry Malyshko (RUS)	16	0	–	–	–	–	16
54	Said Karimulla Khalili (RUS)	–	–	–	–	16	–	16
55	Martin Otcenas (SVK)	DNF	–	–	15	–	–	15
56	Nikita Porshnev (RUS)	3	10	–	2	–	–	15
57	Raman Yaliotnau (BLR)	–	–	14	0	0	–	14
58	Miha Dovžan (SLO)	6	0	–	–	7	–	13
59	Sergey Bocharnikov (BLR)	0	3	–	–	9	–	12
60	Adam Václavík (CZE)	–	0	–	–	11	–	11
#	Name	HOC	ANN	RUH	ANT	KON	OSL	Total
61	Serafin Wiestner (SUI)	11	0	0	0	–	–	11
62	Sean Doherty (USA)	0	0	9	0	–	–	9
63	Grzegorz Guzik (POL)	–	0	–	8	1	–	9
64	Benjamin Weger (SUI)	DNF	0	7	0	–	–	7
65	Dominik Landertinger (AUT)	–	0	6	1	–	–	7
66	Scott Gow (CAN)	–	–	0	6	–	–	6
67	Mario Dolder (SUI)	DNS	0	0	5	–	–	5
68	Joscha Burkhalter (SUI)	4	0	–	–	–	–	4
69	Eduard Latypov (RUS)	–	0	3	–	0	–	3
70	Tommaso Giacomel (ITA)	–	–	–	–	2	–	2
71	Serhiy Semenov (UKR)	–	–	1	0	–	–	1
