= 2019–20 Biathlon World Cup – Mass start Men =

The 2019–20 Biathlon World Cup – Mass start Men started on 22 December 2019 in Le Grand-Bornand and was finished on 8 March 2020 in Nové Město.

== Competition format ==
In the mass start, all biathletes start at the same time and the first across the finish line wins. In this 15 kilometres (9.3 mi) competition, the distance is skied over five laps; there are four bouts of shooting (two prone and two standing, in that order) with the first shooting bout being at the lane corresponding to the competitor's bib number (bib #10 shoots at lane #10 regardless of position in race), with the rest of the shooting bouts being on a first-come, first-served basis (if a competitor arrives at the lane in fifth place, they shoot at lane 5). As in the sprint and pursuit, competitors must ski one 150 metres (490 ft) penalty loop for each miss. Here again, to avoid unwanted congestion, World Cup Mass starts are held with only the 30 top ranking athletes on the start line (half that of the pursuit) as here all contestants start simultaneously.

== 2018–19 Top 3 standings ==
Medal	Athlete	Points
Gold:	(Norway) Johannes Thingnes Bø	262
Silver:	(Germany) Arnd Peiffer	219
Bronze:	(France) Quentin Fillon Maillet	218

== Medal winners ==
Event	Gold	Time	Silver	Time	Bronze	Time
Le Grand-Bornand details	Johannes Thingnes Bø; Norway	41:36.3 (0+0+1+0)	Émilien Jacquelin; France	42:18.4 (0+0+1+0)	Tarjei Bø; Norway	42:28.1 (0+0+0+1)
Oberhof details	Martin Fourcade; France	41:01.4 (0+1+0+1)	Arnd Peiffer; Germany	41:21.5 (0+0+2+1)	Simon Desthieux; France	41:21.7 (0+1+0+2)
Pokljuka details	Quentin Fillon Maillet; France	36:21.5 (0+0+1+0)	Benedikt Doll; Germany	36:31.5 (0+1+0+0)	Johannes Thingnes Bø; Norway	36:31.8 (1+0+0+1)
World Championships details	Johannes Thingnes Bø; Norway	38:09.5 (0+0+0+0)	Quentin Fillon Maillet; France	38:51.5 (1+0+1+1)	Émilien Jacquelin; France	39:04.5 (1+0+1+0)
Nové Město details	Johannes Thingnes Bø; Norway	39:32.7 (1+1+1+0)	Émilien Jacquelin; France	39:47.8 (0+0+0+0)	Arnd Peiffer; Germany	39:57.7 (0+0+0+1)
Oslo	Cancelled due to the coronavirus pandemic					

== Standings ==
#	Name	ANN	OBE	POK	ANT	NME	OSL	Total
1	Johannes Thingnes Bø (NOR)	60	–	48	60	60	–	228
2	Quentin Fillon Maillet (FRA)	43	25	60	54	34	–	216
3	Martin Fourcade (FRA)	40	60	40	36	27	–	203
4	Johannes Dale (NOR)	38	43	36	34	38	–	189
5	Arnd Peiffer (GER)	36	54	28	20	48	–	186
6	Émilien Jacquelin (FRA)	54	2	12	48	54	–	170
7	Vetle Sjåstad Christiansen (NOR)	26	34	43	28	36	–	167
8	Tarjei Bø (NOR)	48	12	32	43	31	–	166
9	Simon Desthieux (FRA)	31	48	24	40	20	–	163
10	Benedikt Doll (GER)	25	18	54	29	24	–	150
11	Jakov Fak (SLO)	28	40	20	26	28	–	142
12	Erlend Bjøntegaard (NOR)	32	28	38	–	40	–	138
13	Johannes Kühn (GER)	27	22	10	31	29	–	119
14	Simon Eder (AUT)	34	30	34	–	18	–	116
15	Dmytro Pidruchnyi (UKR)	16	26	6	16	43	–	107
16	Dominik Windisch (ITA)	24	16	8	27	32	–	107
17	Matvey Eliseev (RUS)	4	31	30	6	25	–	96
18	Philipp Horn (GER)	6	38	29	14	8	–	95
19	Julian Eberhard (AUT)	18	27	14	32	–	–	91
20	Michal Krčmář (CZE)	12	32	26	–	21	–	91
21	Felix Leitner (AUT)	29	6	–	38	16	–	89
22	Lukas Hofer (ITA)	20	10	31	23	4	–	88
23	Ondřej Moravec (CZE)	–	29	–	30	22	–	81
24	Alexandr Loginov (RUS)	30	24	21	–	–	–	75
25	Artem Pryma (UKR)	–	14	4	21	30	–	69
26	Jesper Nelin (SWE)	–	36	–	22	–	–	58
27	Benjamin Weger (SUI)	–	21	16	12	–	–	49
28	Vladimir Iliev (BUL)	21	20	–	–	–	–	41
29	Fabien Claude (FRA)	22	4	–	–	12	–	38
30	Nikita Porshnev (RUS)	23	–	–	10	–	–	33
#	Name	ANN	OBE	POK	ANT	NME	OSL	Total
31	Antonin Guigonnat (FRA)	–	–	18	–	10	–	28
32	Erik Lesser (GER)	–	–	27	–	–	–	27
33	Andrejs Rastorgujevs (LAT)	–	–	25	–	2	–	27
34	Sturla Holm Laegreid (NOR)	–	–	–	–	26	–	26
35	Krasimir Anev (BUL)	–	–	–	25	–	–	25
36	Dominik Landertinger (AUT)	–	–	–	24	–	–	24
37	Philipp Nawrath (GER)	–	–	23	–	–	–	23
37	Raman Yaliotnau (BLR)	–	23	–	–	–	–	23
37	Tero Seppälä (FIN)	–	–	–	–	23	–	23
40	Kirill Streltsov (RUS)	–	–	22	–	–	–	22
41	Simon Schempp (GER)	14	8	–	–	–	–	22
42	Peppe Femling (SWE)	–	–	–	18	–	–	18
43	Cheng Fangming (CHN)	–	–	–	–	14	–	14
44	Martin Ponsiluoma (SWE)	8	–	–	4	–	–	12
45	Florent Claude (BEL)	10	–	–	–	–	–	10
46	Sebastian Samuelsson (SWE)	–	–	–	8	–	–	8
47	Eduard Latypov (RUS)	–	–	–	–	6	–	6
48	Timofey Lapshin (KOR)	2	–	–	–	–	–	2
48	Sergey Bocharnikov (BLR)	–	–	2	–	–	–	2
48	Martin Otcenas (SVK)	–	–	–	2	–	–	2
