= 2019–20 Biathlon World Cup – Relay Men =

The 2019–20 Biathlon World Cup – Relay Men started on Saturday 7 December 2019 in Östersund and finished on Saturday 7 March 2020 in Nové Město. The defending team was Norway.

== Competition format ==
The relay teams consist of four biathletes. Every athlete's leg is skied over three 2.5 kilometres (1.6 mi) laps for a total of 7.5 kilometres (4.7 mi), with two shooting rounds: one prone and one standing. For every round of five targets there are eight bullets available, though the last three can only be single-loaded manually from the spare round holders or from bullets deposited by the athlete into trays or onto the mat at the firing line. If after eight bullets there are still standing targets, one 150 metres (490 ft) penalty loop must be taken for each remaining target. The first-leg participants start all at the same time, and as in cross-country skiing relays, every athlete of a team must touch the team's next-leg participant to perform a valid changeover. On the first shooting stage of the first leg, the participant must shoot in the lane corresponding to their bib number (bib #10 shoots at lane #10 regardless of their position in the race), then for the remainder of the relay, the athletes shoot at the lane corresponding to the position they arrived (arrive at the range in 5th place, shoot at lane five).

== 2018–19 Top 3 standings ==
Medal	Nation	Points
Gold:	Norway	270
Silver:	Russia	236
Bronze:	Germany	233

== Medal winners ==
Event	Gold	Time	Silver	Time	Bronze	Time
Östersund details	Norway Johannes Dale; Erlend Bjøntegaard; Tarjei Bø; Johannes Thingnes Bø	1:10:30.4 (0+0) (0+2) (0+2) (0+1) (0+1) (0+1) (0+1) (0+1)	France Émilien Jacquelin; Quentin Fillon Maillet; Simon Desthieux; Martin Fourcade	1:11:02.7 (0+0) (0+1) (1+3) (0+0) (0+1) (0+2) (0+0) (0+0)	Italy Lukas Hofer; Thomas Bormolini; Daniele Cappellari; Dominik Windisch	1:11:57.5 (0+1) (0+1) (0+1) (0+2) (0+1) (0+0) (0+1) (0+1)
Hochfilzen details	Norway Johannes Dale; Erlend Bjøntegaard; Tarjei Bø; Johannes Thingnes Bø	1:14:44.2 (0+0) (0+0) (1+3) (0+2) (0+0) (0+0) (0+0) (0+2)	Germany Philipp Horn; Johannes Kühn; Arnd Peiffer; Benedikt Doll	1:14:46.2 (0+2) (0+2) (0+0) (0+0) (0+0) (0+0) (0+0) (0+2)	France Antonin Guigonnat; Émilien Jacquelin; Fabien Claude; Quentin Fillon Maillet	1:15:36.1 (0+2) (0+0) (0+0) (0+2) (0+0) (1+3) (0+1) (0+0)
Oberhof details	Norway Lars Helge Birkeland; Erlend Bjøntegaard; Johannes Dale; Vetle Sjåstad Christiansen	1:19:32.3 (0+0) (0+0) (0+2) (0+0) (0+0) (1+3) (0+0) (1+3)	France Émilien Jacquelin; Martin Fourcade; Simon Desthieux; Quentin Fillon Maillet	1:19:36.7 (0+1) (2+3) (0+0) (0+0) (0+0) (0+1) (0+0) (0+1)	Germany Philipp Horn; Johannes Kühn; Arnd Peiffer; Benedikt Doll	1:20:20.5 (0+3) (0+0) (0+0) (1+3) (0+2) (0+3) (0+0) (1+3)
Ruhpolding details	France Émilien Jacquelin; Martin Fourcade; Simon Desthieux; Quentin Fillon Maillet	1:18:11.2 (0+0) (0+1) (0+0) (0+0) (0+1) (0+0) (0+2) (0+2)	Norway Johannes Dale; Erlend Bjøntegaard; Tarjei Bø; Vetle Sjåstad Christiansen	1:19:23.4 (0+1) (0+3) (0+2) (0+2) (0+0) (0+1) (0+0) (0+1)	Austria Dominik Landertinger; Simon Eder; Felix Leitner; Julian Eberhard	1:19:35.5 (0+0) (0+1) (0+0) (0+1) (0+0) (0+1) (0+1) (0+0)
World Championships details	France Émilien Jacquelin; Martin Fourcade; Simon Desthieux; Quentin Fillon Maillet	1:12:35.9 (0+0) (0+1) (0+0) (0+0) (0+0) (0+1) (0+0) (0+2)	Norway Vetle Sjåstad Christiansen; Johannes Dale; Tarjei Bø; Johannes Thingnes Bø	1:12:57.4 (0+0) (1+3) (0+0) (0+3) (0+1) (0+2) (0+2) (0+1)	Germany Erik Lesser; Philipp Horn; Arnd Peiffer; Benedikt Doll	1:13:12.1 (0+0) (0+0) (0+0) (0+1) (0+0) (0+1) (0+3) (1+3)
Nové Město details	Norway Vetle Sjåstad Christiansen; Johannes Dale; Tarjei Bø; Johannes Thingnes Bø	1:10:25.3 (0+1) (0+1) (0+2) (0+0) (0+0) (0+1) (0+0) (0+0)	Ukraine Artem Pryma; Serhiy Semenov; Ruslan Tkalenko; Dmytro Pidruchnyi	1:11:03.5 (0+0) (0+2) (0+1) (0+0) (0+1) (0+0) (0+0) (0+1)	Sweden Sebastian Samuelsson; Jesper Nelin; Peppe Femling; Martin Ponsiluoma	1:11:08.6 (0+1) (0+0) (0+0) (1+3) (0+3) (0+0) (0+1) (0+0)

== Standings ==
#	Nation	ÖST	HOC	OBE	RUH	ANT	NOV	Total
1	Norway	60	60	60	54	54	60	348
2	France	54	48	54	60	60	26	302
3	Germany	34	54	48	40	48	40	264
4	Russia	43	38	43	43	43	43	253
5	Ukraine	38	30	31	34	29	54	216
6	Slovenia	36	32	38	36	40	34	216
7	Sweden	40	31	30	32	31	48	212
8	Belarus	27	36	40	38	32	36	209
9	Austria	29	29	32	48	38	31	207
10	Italy	48	34	18	29	36	38	203
11	Czech Republic	28	40	34	30	28	29	189
12	Switzerland	31	27	36	25	26	32	177
13	Canada	30	43	27	22	27	27	176
14	United States	26	23	29	31	34	30	173
15	Bulgaria	32	24	15	24	30	28	153
16	Poland	25	26	19	28	25	18	141
17	Estonia	24	25	28	19	20	25	141
18	Finland	23	28	22	26	15	19	133
19	China	19	16	25	23	23	24	130
20	Slovakia	22	22	23	16	24	34	130
21	Lithuania	21	19	21	27	17	20	125
22	Romania	20	15	26	20	18	22	121
23	Latvia	15	20	20	17	19	16	107
24	Kazakhstan	18	17	24	15	16	15	105
25	Belgium	—	21	17	21	22	21	102
26	South Korea	16	14	16	18	14	17	95
27	Japan	17	18	—	—	21	—	56
