= 2019–20 Biathlon World Cup – Mixed Relay =

The 2019–20 Biathlon World Cup – Mixed Relay started on Saturday 30 November 2019 in Östersund and will finished on Sunday 15 March 2020 in Kontiolahti. The defending team was Norway.

== Competition format ==
The relay teams consist of four biathletes. Legs 1 and 2 are skied by the women, and legs 3 and 4 by the men. Two variation have this competition. The both gender's legs are 6 kilometres (3.7 mi) or the women's legs are 6 kilometres (3.7 mi) and men's legs are 7.5 kilometres (4.7 mi). Every athlete's leg is skied over three laps, with two shooting rounds: one prone and one standing. For every round of five targets there are eight bullets available, though the last three can only be single-loaded manually from the spare round holders or from bullets deposited by the athlete into trays or onto the mat at the firing line. If after eight bullets there are still standing targets, one 150 metres (490 ft) penalty loop must be taken for each remaining target. The first-leg participants all start at the same time, and as in cross-country skiing relays, every athlete of a team must touch the team's next-leg participant to perform a valid changeover. On the first shooting stage of the first leg, the participant must shoot in the lane corresponding to their bib number (bib #10 shoots at lane #10 regardless of their position in the race), then for the remainder of the relay, the athletes shoot at the lane corresponding to the position they arrived (arrive at the range in 5th place, shoot at lane five).

The single mixed relay involves one male and one female biathlete each completing two legs consisting of one prone and one standing shoot. The female biathletes all start the race at the same time and complete one 6 kilometres (3.7 mi) leg before exchanging with their male counterparts who complete one 7.5 kilometres (4.7 mi) leg before exchanging again with the female skier who after completing another leg switches again with the male biathlete who completes the race. The rules regarding shooting are the same as in the regular mixed relay.

== 2018–19 Top 3 standings ==
Medal	Nation	Points
Gold:	Norway	306
Gold:	France	281
Bronze:	Italy	267

== Medal winners ==
Event	Gold	Time	Silver	Time	Bronze	Time
Östersund (SR) details	Sweden Hanna Öberg; Sebastian Samuelsson	36:42.1 (1+3) (1+3) (0+0) (0+1) (0+2) (0+0) (0+1) (0+1)	Germany Franziska Preuß; Erik Lesser	37:00.2 (0+2) (0+0) (0+2) (0+1) (0+1) (0+0) (0+0) (1+3)	Norway Marte Olsbu Røiseland; Vetle Sjåstad Christiansen	37:22.5 (0+3) (0+2) (0+2) (1+3) (0+3) (0+0) (0+0) (0+3)
Östersund (MR) details	Italy Lisa Vittozzi; Dorothea Wierer; Lukas Hofer; Dominik Windisch	1:05:56.1 (0+2) (0+0) (0+1) (0+0) (0+1) (0+1) (0+2) (0+2)	Norway Ingrid Landmark Tandrevold; Tiril Eckhoff; Tarjei Bø; Johannes Thingnes Bø	1:06:00.2 (0+2) (0+3) (0+2) (0+3) (0+1) (0+1) (0+3) (0+0)	Sweden Linn Persson; Mona Brorsson; Jesper Nelin; Martin Ponsiluoma	1:06:56.0 (0+0) (0+3) (0+0) (0+1) (0+0) (0+3) (0+3) (0+1)
Pokljuka (SR) details	France Émilien Jacquelin; Anaïs Bescond	38:33.4 (0+0) (0+0) (0+1) (0+0) (0+1) (0+2) (0+1) (0+0)	Estonia Rene Zahkna; Regina Oja	38:39.3 (0+0) (0+0) (0+1) (0+0) (0+1) (0+1) (0+0) (0+0)	Austria Simon Eder; Lisa Hauser	38:45.5 (0+1) (0+1) (0+1) (0+2) (0+0) (0+0) (0+0) (0+1)
Pokljuka (MR) details	France Quentin Fillon Maillet; Simon Desthieux; Justine Braisaz; Julia Simon	1:17:53.3 (0+1) (0+0) (0+2) (0+0) (0+2) (0+1) (0+1) (0+1)	Norway Tarjei Bø; Johannes Thingnes Bø; Synnøve Solemdal; Ingrid Landmark Tandrevold	1:18:33.9 (0+0) (0+0) (0+2) (0+0) (0+0) (0+2) (0+0) (0+0)	Germany Philipp Horn; Johannes Kühn; Janina Hettich; Vanessa Hinz	1:18:54.7 (0+0) (0+0) (0+0) (0+1) (0+0) (0+2) (0+0) (0+1)
World Championships (MR) details	Norway Marte Olsbu Røiseland; Tiril Eckhoff; Tarjei Bø; Johannes Thingnes Bø	1:02:27.7 (0+0) (0+1) (0+2) (0+0) (0+0) (0+2) (0+0) (0+2)	Italy Lisa Vittozzi; Dorothea Wierer; Lukas Hofer; Dominik Windisch	1:02:43.3 (0+2) (0+0) (0+1) (0+1) (0+0) (0+0) (0+0) (0+2)	Czech Republic Eva Puskarčíková; Markéta Davidová; Ondřej Moravec; Michal Krčmář	1:02:58.5 (0+1) (0+0) (0+0) (0+0) (0+0) (0+0) (0+0) (0+1)
World Championships (SR) details	Norway Marte Olsbu Røiseland; Johannes Thingnes Bø	34:19.9 (0+1) (0+0) (0+1) (0+3) (0+0) (0+1) (0+0) (0+0)	Germany Franziska Preuß; Erik Lesser	34:37.5 (0+0) (0+1) (0+0) (0+2) (0+1) (0+0) (0+0) (0+1)	France Anaïs Bescond; Émilien Jacquelin	34:49.7 (0+0) (0+0) (0+2) (0+1) (0+1) (0+0) (0+0) (0+0)
Kontiolahti (SR)	Cancelled due to the coronavirus pandemic					
Kontiolahti (MR)	Cancelled due to the coronavirus pandemic					

== Standings ==
#	Nation	ÖST SR	ÖST MR	POK SR	POK MR	ANT MR	ANT SR	KON SR	KON MR	Total
1	Norway	48	54	31	54	60	60	—	—	307
2	France	36	32	60	60	36	48	—	—	272
3	Germany	54	36	30	48	43	54	—	—	265
4	Sweden	60	48	29	40	30	43	—	—	250
5	Italy	34	60	22	32	54	32	—	—	234
6	Austria	30	40	48	36	34	38	—	—	226
7	Russia	29	43	28	43	38	36	—	—	217
8	Switzerland	28	38	38	31	31	40	—	—	206
9	Estonia	40	23	54	22	26	29	—	—	194
10	Czech Republic	23	30	24	38	48	27	—	—	190
11	Canada	31	29	43	23	27	34	—	—	187
12	Ukraine	43	26	40	DSQ	40	31	—	—	180
13	Belarus	32	25	32	34	29	26	—	—	178
14	United States	38	34	18	29	28	30	—	—	177
15	Poland	25	27	26	27	24	23	—	—	152
16	Japan	21	18	25	26	21	28	—	—	139
17	Finland	24	31	—	28	32	18	—	—	133
18	Slovakia	17	28	27	20	22	15	—	—	129
19	Slovenia	22	19	17	30	18	22	—	—	128
20	Kazakhstan	27	20	19	21	19	19	—	—	125
21	China	20	22	20	19	23	20	—	—	124
22	Bulgaria	26	24	16	24	17	16	—	—	123
23	Lithuania	19	16	21	25	25	17	—	—	123
24	Latvia	—	17	36	17	20	24	—	—	114
25	South Korea	15	21	34	DNF	14	25	—	—	109
26	Romania	18	—	15	18	15	14	—	—	80
27	Belgium	—	—	23	—	16	21	—	—	60
28	Croatia	16	—	—	—	—	13	—	—	29
29	Hungary	—	—	—	—	—	12	—	—	12
30	United Kingdom	—	—	—	—	—	11	—	—	11
