= 2019–20 Biathlon World Cup – Individual Women =

The 2019–20 Biathlon World Cup – Individual Women started on 5 December 2019 in Östersund and will finished on 18 February 2020 in Antholz-Anterselva.

== Competition format ==
The individual race is the oldest biathlon event; the distance is skied over five laps. The biathlete shoots four times at any shooting lane, in the order of prone, standing, prone, standing, totalling 20 targets. Competitors' starts are staggered, normally by 30 seconds. The distance skied is usually 15 kilometres (9.3 mi) with a fixed penalty time of one minute per missed target that is added to the skiing time of the biathlete. In the "Short Individual" the distance is 12.5 kilometres (7.8 mi) with a penalty time of 45 seconds per missed target.

== 2018–19 Top 3 standings ==
Medal	Athlete	Points
Gold:	(Italy) Lisa Vittozzi	140
Silver:	(Slovakia) Paulína Fialková	111
Bronze:	(Czech Republic) Markéta Davidová	102

== Medal winners ==
Event	Gold	Time	Silver	Time	Bronze	Time
Östersund details	Justine Braisaz; France	42:35.1 (2+0+0+0)	Yuliia Dzhima; Ukraine	42:46.2 (0+0+0+0)	Julia Simon; France	42:52.8 (0+0+0+2)
Pokljuka details	Denise Herrmann; Germany	41:33.4 (0+0+0+0)	Hanna Öberg; Sweden	42:32.6 (0+1+0+0)	Anaïs Bescond; France	42:49.1 (0+0+0+0)
World Championships details	Dorothea Wierer; Italy	43:07.7 (1+1+0+0)	Vanessa Hinz; Germany	43:09.9 (0+0+0+1)	Marte Olsbu Røiseland; Norway	43:23.5 (0+1+0+1)

== Standings ==
#	Name	ÖST	POK	ANT	Total
1	Hanna Öberg (SWE)	31	54	43	128
2	Dorothea Wierer (ITA)	36	18	60	114
3	Justine Braisaz (FRA)	60	30	22	112
4	Denise Herrmann (GER)	23	60	29	112
5	Franziska Preuß (GER)	29	40	40	109
6	Marte Olsbu Røiseland (NOR)	22	29	48	99
7	Monika Hojnisz-Staręga (POL)	34	24	38	96
8	Vanessa Hinz (GER)	11	26	54	91
9	Larisa Kuklina (RUS)	40	28	18	86
10	Yuliia Dzhima (UKR)	54	27	4	85
11	Ingrid Landmark Tandrevold (NOR)	43	9	25	77
12	Lisa Vittozzi (ITA)	32	43	0	75
13	Julia Simon (FRA)	48	16	10	74
14	Markéta Davidová (CZE)	30	2	34	66
15	Tiril Eckhoff (NOR)	12	23	26	61
16	Ekaterina Yurlova-Percht (RUS)	25	6	28	59
17	Christina Rieder (AUT)	0	20	36	56
18	Eva Kristejn-Puskarčíková (CZE)	18	3	31	52
19	Mona Brorsson (SWE)	26	—	23	49
20	Anaïs Bescond (FRA)	0	48	0	48
21	Kaisa Mäkäräinen (FIN)	28	0	20	48
22	Aita Gasparin (SUI)	0	32	14	46
23	Clare Egan (USA)	6	38	0	44
24	Anastasiya Merkushyna (UKR)	10	4	30	44
25	Irina Starykh (RUS)	—	34	9	43
26	Julia Schwaiger (AUT)	21	22	0	43
27	Lisa Hauser (AUT)	3	36	0	39
28	Lena Häcki (SUI)	38	0	0	38
29	Emma Lunder (CAN)	DNS	31	6	37
30	Karolin Horchler (GER)	0	21	15	36
#	Name	ÖST	POK	ANT	Total
31	Katharina Innerhofer (AUT)	4	8	21	33
32	Baiba Bendika (LAT)	0	17	16	33
33	Galina Vishnevskaya (KAZ)	0	0	32	32
34	Elvira Öberg (SWE)	5	—	27	32
35	Tamara Voronina (RUS)	27	—	—	27
36	Milena Todorova (BUL)	2	—	24	26
37	Célia Aymonier (FRA)	0	13	13	26
38	Mari Eder (FIN)	0	25	0	25
39	Vita Semerenko (UKR)	13	—	12	25
40	Linn Persson (SWE)	24	—	0	24
41	Darya Blashko (UKR)	20	0	—	20
42	Selina Gasparin (SUI)	19	0	0	19
43	Svetlana Mironova (RUS)	0	0	19	19
44	Anna Magnusson (SWE)	—	19	—	19
45	Paulína Fialková (SVK)	—	0	17	17
46	Karoline Offigstad Knotten (NOR)	17	0	—	17
47	Dunja Zdouc (AUT)	16	0	—	16
48	Chloé Chevalier (FRA)	15	0	—	15
49	Janina Hettich (GER)	—	15	—	15
50	Kristina Reztsova (RUS)	0	14	—	14
51	Grete Gaim (EST)	14	0	—	14
52	Synnøve Solemdal (NOR)	—	12	0	12
53	Iryna Kryuko (BLR)	0	DNF	11	11
54	Elisa Gasparin (SUI)	0	11	0	11
55	Federica Sanfilippo (ITA)	0	10	0	10
56	Ingela Andersson (SWE)	9	—	—	9
57	Nadia Moser (CAN)	0	0	8	8
58	Dzinara Alimbekava (BLR)	8	—	—	8
59	Fuyuko Tachizaki (JPN)	0	0	7	7
60	Anastassiya Kondratyeva (KAZ)	7	0	0	7
#	Name	ÖST	POK	ANT	Total
61	Elisabeth Högberg (SWE)	—	7	—	7
62	Elena Kruchinkina (BLR)	0	5	0	5
63	Daniela Kadeva (BUL)	0	0	5	5
64	Tang Jialin (CHN)	0	—	3	3
65	Suvi Minkkinen (FIN)	0	—	2	2
66	Ivona Fialková (SVK)	0	0	1	1
67	Olena Pidhrushna (UKR)	—	1	—	1
67	Emma Nilsson (SWE)	1	—	—	1
