= 2019–20 Biathlon World Cup – Individual Men =

The 2019–20 Biathlon World Cup – Individual Men started on 4 December 2019 in Östersund and will finished on 19 February 2020 in Antholz-Anterselva.

== Competition format ==
The individual race is the oldest biathlon event; the distance is skied over five laps. The biathlete shoots four times at any shooting lane, in the order of prone, standing, prone, standing, totalling 20 targets. Competitors' starts are staggered, normally by 30 seconds. The distance skied is usually 20 kilometres (12.4 mi) with a fixed penalty time of one minute per missed target that is added to the skiing time of the biathlete. In the "Short Individual" the distance is 15 kilometres (9.3 mi) with a penalty time of 45 seconds per missed target.

== 2018–19 Top 3 standings ==
Medal	Athlete	Points
Gold:	(Norway) Johannes Thingnes Bø	128
Silver:	(Norway) Vetle Sjåstad Christiansen	118
Bronze:	(Norway) Lars Helge Birkeland	97

== Medal winners ==
Event	Gold	Time	Silver	Time	Bronze	Time
Östersund details	Martin Fourcade; France	53:11.9 (0+0+0+1)	Simon Desthieux; France	53:24.6 (0+1+0+0)	Quentin Fillon Maillet; France	55:02.7 (2+0+0+1)
Pokljuka details	Johannes Thingnes Bø; Norway	47:54.3 (0+0+0+0)	Martin Fourcade; France	48:05.7 (0+0+0+0)	Fabien Claude; France	48:19.9 (0+0+0+0)
World Championships details	Martin Fourcade; France	49:43.1 (0+0+0+1)	Johannes Thingnes Bø; Norway	50:40.1 (1+0+0+1)	Dominik Landertinger; Austria	51:05.2 (0+0+0+1)

== Standings ==
#	Name	ÖST	POK	ANT	Total
1	Martin Fourcade (FRA)	60	54	60	174
2	Johannes Thingnes Bø (NOR)	31	60	54	145
3	Quentin Fillon Maillet (FRA)	48	36	36	120
4	Tarjei Bø (NOR)	38	38	38	114
5	Fabien Claude (FRA)	36	48	22	106
6	Benjamin Weger (SUI)	40	19	40	99
7	Benedikt Doll (GER)	25	31	29	85
8	Alexandr Loginov (RUS)	32	25	26	83
9	Lukas Hofer (ITA)	22	28	28	78
10	Johannes Dale (NOR)	5	40	32	77
11	Simon Desthieux (FRA)	54	20	0	74
12	Jakov Fak (SLO)	0	29	43	72
13	Dominik Landertinger (AUT)	20	0	48	68
14	Ondřej Moravec (CZE)	24	16	25	65
15	Evgeniy Garanichev (RUS)	30	6	27	63
16	Philipp Horn (GER)	14	27	20	61
17	Simon Eder (AUT)	29	26	1	56
18	Émilien Jacquelin (FRA)	43	9	–	52
19	Johannes Kühn (GER)	0	34	15	49
20	Sebastian Samuelsson (SWE)	18	–	31	49
21	Krasimir Anev (BUL)	26	DNF	23	49
22	Leif Nordgren (USA)	0	14	34	48
23	Andrejs Rastorgujevs (LAT)	7	22	19	48
24	Philipp Nawrath (GER)	–	43	0	43
25	Vetle Sjåstad Christiansen (NOR)	10	32	0	42
26	Matvey Eliseev (RUS)	34	3	–	37
27	Felix Leitner (AUT)	23	0	14	37
28	Nikita Porshnev (RUS)	0	4	30	34
29	Erlend Bjøntegaard (NOR)	28	5	–	33
30	Dmytro Pidruchnyi (UKR)	21	11	–	32
#	Name	ÖST	POK	ANT	Total
31	Florent Claude (BEL)	16	0	16	32
32	Artem Pryma (UKR)	3	23	5	31
33	Antonin Guigonnat (FRA)	0	30	–	30
34	Michal Krčmář (CZE)	12	0	18	30
35	Anton Babikov (RUS)	27	–	–	27
36	Peppe Femling (SWE)	0	0	24	24
37	Kirill Streltsov (RUS)	–	24	–	24
38	Scott Gow (CAN)	8	15	0	23
39	Martin Ponsiluoma (SWE)	11	–	12	23
40	Christian Gow (CAN)	0	0	21	21
41	Erik Lesser (GER)	0	21	–	21
42	Cheng Fangming (CHN)	19	–	0	19
43	Karol Dombrovski (LTU)	0	8	11	19
44	Sergey Bocharnikov (BLR)	0	18	0	18
45	Eduard Latypov (RUS)	0	17	0	17
46	Julian Eberhard (AUT)	17	0	DNF	17
47	Sean Doherty (USA)	0	0	17	17
48	Tero Seppälä (FIN)	15	0	0	15
49	Klemen Bauer (SLO)	0	7	8	15
50	Maksim Varabei (BLR)	0	13	0	13
51	Thomas Bormolini (ITA)	13	0	0	13
52	Jules Burnotte (CAN)	DNS	0	13	13
53	Anton Smolski (BLR)	6	0	7	13
54	Vladimir Iliev (BUL)	0	12	0	12
55	Sergii Semenov (UKR)	–	1	10	11
56	Rok Trsan (SLO)	0	10	0	10
57	George Buta (ROU)	0	0	9	9
58	Jakub Štvrtecký (CZE)	9	–	0	9
59	Rene Zahkna (EST)	0	0	6	6
60	Lukasz Szczurek (POL)	0	0	4	4
#	Name	ÖST	POK	ANT	Total
61	Lars Helge Birkeland (NOR)	4	–	–	4
62	Thierry Langer (BEL)	0	–	3	3
63	Martin Otcenas (SVK)	0	2	0	2
64	Andrzej Nedza-Kubiniec (POL)	0	0	2	2
65	Dmitry Malyshko (RUS)	2	–	–	2
66	Michal Šlesingr (CZE)	1	0	0	1
