= 2019–20 Biathlon World Cup =

Biathlon competition

Discipline	Men	Women
Overall	(Norway) Johannes Thingnes Bø	(Italy) Dorothea Wierer
Nations Cup	Norway	Norway
Individual	(France) Martin Fourcade	(Sweden) Hanna Öberg
Sprint	(France) Martin Fourcade	(Germany) Denise Herrmann
Pursuit	(France) Émilien Jacquelin	(Norway) Tiril Eckhoff
Mass start	(Norway) Johannes Thingnes Bø	(Italy) Dorothea Wierer
Relay	Norway	Norway
- Mixed: Norway

Competition

The 2019–20 Biathlon World Cup (BWC) was a multi-race series over a season of biathlon, organised by the International Biathlon Union. The season started on 30 November 2019 in Östersund, Sweden and ended on 14 March 2020 in Kontiolahti, Finland, a week and a day earlier than planned.

== Calendar ==
Below was the IBU World Cup calendar for the 2019–20 season.

Stage	Location	Date	Individual	Sprint	Pursuit	Mass start	Relay	Mixed relay	Single mixed relay	Details
1	(Sweden) Östersund	30 November – 8 December	●	●			●	●	●	details
2	(Austria) Hochfilzen	13–15 December		●	●		●			details
3	(France) Annecy-Le Grand-Bornand	19–22 December		●	●	●				details
4	(Germany) Oberhof	9–12 January		●		●	●			details
5	(Germany) Ruhpolding	15–19 January		●	●		●			details
6	(Slovenia) Pokljuka	23–26 January	●			●		●	●	details
WC	(Italy) Antholz-Anterselva	13–23 February	●	●	●	●	●	●	●	World Championships
7	(Czech Republic) Nové Město	5–8 March		●		●	●			details
8	(Finland) Kontiolahti	12–15 March		●	●			Cancelled	Cancelled	details
9	(Norway) Oslo Holmenkollen	20–22 March		Cancelled	Cancelled	Cancelled				Cancelled
Total: 60 (27 men's, 27 women's, 6 mixed)			3 (m, w)	8 (m, w)	5 (m, w)	5 (m, w)	6 (m, w)	3 (mix)	3 (mix)	

== World Cup podiums ==
=== Men ===
Stage	Date	Place	Discipline	Winner	Second	Third	Yellow bib (After competition)	Det.
1	1 December 2019	(Sweden) Östersund	10 km Sprint	(Norway) Johannes Thingnes Bø	(Norway) Tarjei Bø	(Russia) Matvey Eliseev	(Norway) Johannes Thingnes Bø	Detail
1	4 December 2019	(Sweden) Östersund	20 km Individual	(France) Martin Fourcade	(France) Simon Desthieux	(France) Quentin Fillon Maillet	(France) Martin Fourcade	Detail
2	13 December 2019	(Austria) Hochfilzen	10 km Sprint	(Norway) Johannes Thingnes Bø	(France) Simon Desthieux	(Russia) Alexandr Loginov	(Norway) Johannes Thingnes Bø	Detail
2	14 December 2019	(Austria) Hochfilzen	12.5 km Pursuit	(Norway) Johannes Thingnes Bø	(Russia) Alexandr Loginov	(France) Émilien Jacquelin	(Norway) Johannes Thingnes Bø	Detail
3	19 December 2019	(France) Le Grand-Bornand	10 km Sprint	(Germany) Benedikt Doll	(Norway) Tarjei Bø	(France) Quentin Fillon Maillet	(Norway) Johannes Thingnes Bø	Detail
3	21 December 2019	(France) Le Grand-Bornand	12.5 km Pursuit	(Norway) Johannes Thingnes Bø	(France) Quentin Fillon Maillet	(Norway) Vetle Sjåstad Christiansen	(Norway) Johannes Thingnes Bø	Detail
3	22 December 2019	(France) Le Grand-Bornand	15 km Mass Start	(Norway) Johannes Thingnes Bø	(France) Émilien Jacquelin	(Norway) Tarjei Bø	(Norway) Johannes Thingnes Bø	Detail
4	10 January 2020	(Germany) Oberhof	10 km Sprint	(France) Martin Fourcade	(France) Émilien Jacquelin	(Germany) Johannes Kühn	(Norway) Johannes Thingnes Bø	Detail
4	12 January 2020	(Germany) Oberhof	15 km Mass Start	(France) Martin Fourcade	(Germany) Arnd Peiffer	(France) Simon Desthieux	(France) Martin Fourcade	Detail
5	16 January 2020	(Germany) Ruhpolding	10 km Sprint	(France) Martin Fourcade	(France) Quentin Fillon Maillet	(Germany) Benedikt Doll	(France) Martin Fourcade	Detail
5	19 January 2020	(Germany) Ruhpolding	12.5 km Pursuit	(France) Martin Fourcade	(France) Quentin Fillon Maillet	(Norway) Vetle Sjåstad Christiansen	(France) Martin Fourcade	Detail
6	23 January 2020	(Slovenia) Pokljuka	20 km Individual	(Norway) Johannes Thingnes Bø	(France) Martin Fourcade	(France) Fabien Claude	(France) Martin Fourcade	Detail
6	26 January 2020	(Slovenia) Pokljuka	15 km Mass Start	(France) Quentin Fillon Maillet	(Germany) Benedikt Doll	(Norway) Johannes Thingnes Bø	(France) Martin Fourcade	Detail
WC	15 February 2020	(Italy) Antholz-Anterselva	10 km Sprint	(Russia) Alexandr Loginov	(France) Quentin Fillon Maillet	(France) Martin Fourcade	(France) Martin Fourcade	Detail
WC	16 February 2020	(Italy) Antholz-Anterselva	12.5 km Pursuit	(France) Émilien Jacquelin	(Norway) Johannes Thingnes Bø	(Russia) Alexandr Loginov	(France) Martin Fourcade	Detail
WC	19 February 2020	(Italy) Antholz-Anterselva	20 km Individual	(France) Martin Fourcade	(Norway) Johannes Thingnes Bø	(Austria) Dominik Landertinger	(France) Martin Fourcade	Detail
WC	23 February 2020	(Italy) Antholz-Anterselva	15 km Mass Start	(Norway) Johannes Thingnes Bø	(France) Quentin Fillon Maillet	(France) Émilien Jacquelin	(France) Martin Fourcade	Detail
7	6 March 2020	(Czech Republic) Nové Město na M.	10 km Sprint	(Norway) Johannes Thingnes Bø	(France) Quentin Fillon Maillet	(Norway) Tarjei Bø	(France) Martin Fourcade	Detail
7	8 March 2020	(Czech Republic) Nové Město na M.	15 km Mass Start	(Norway) Johannes Thingnes Bø	(France) Émilien Jacquelin	(Germany) Arnd Peiffer	(France) Martin Fourcade	Detail
8	12 March 2020	(Finland) Kontiolahti	10 km Sprint	(Norway) Johannes Thingnes Bø	(France) Martin Fourcade	(France) Émilien Jacquelin	(France) Martin Fourcade	Detail
8	14 March 2020	(Finland) Kontiolahti	12.5 km Pursuit	(France) Martin Fourcade	(France) Quentin Fillon Maillet	(France) Émilien Jacquelin	(Norway) Johannes Thingnes Bø	Detail
9	20 March 2020	(Norway) Oslo Holmenkollen	10 km Sprint	Cancelled due to the outbreak of COVID-19				
9	21 March 2020	(Norway) Oslo Holmenkollen	12.5 km Pursuit	Cancelled due to the outbreak of COVID-19				
9	22 March 2020	(Norway) Oslo Holmenkollen	15 km Mass Start	Cancelled due to the outbreak of COVID-19				

=== Women ===
Stage	Date	Place	Discipline	Winner	Second	Third	Yellow bib (After competition)	Det.
1	1 December 2019	(Sweden) Östersund	7.5 km Sprint	(Italy) Dorothea Wierer	(Norway) Marte Olsbu Røiseland	(Czech Republic) Markéta Davidová	(Italy) Dorothea Wierer	Detail
1	5 December 2019	(Sweden) Östersund	15 km Individual	(France) Justine Braisaz	(Ukraine) Yuliia Dzhima	(France) Julia Simon	(Italy) Dorothea Wierer	Detail
2	13 December 2019	(Austria) Hochfilzen	7.5 km Sprint	(Italy) Dorothea Wierer	(Norway) Ingrid Landmark Tandrevold	(Russia) Svetlana Mironova	(Italy) Dorothea Wierer	Detail
2	15 December 2019	(Austria) Hochfilzen	10 km Pursuit	(Norway) Tiril Eckhoff	(Sweden) Hanna Öberg	(Norway) Ingrid Landmark Tandrevold	(Italy) Dorothea Wierer	Detail
3	20 December 2019	(France) Le Grand-Bornand	7.5 km Sprint	(Norway) Tiril Eckhoff	(France) Justine Braisaz	(Czech Republic) Markéta Davidová	(Italy) Dorothea Wierer	Detail
3	21 December 2019	(France) Le Grand-Bornand	10 km Pursuit	(Norway) Tiril Eckhoff	(Norway) Ingrid Landmark Tandrevold	(Switzerland) Lena Häcki	(Norway) Ingrid Landmark Tandrevold	Detail
3	22 December 2019	(France) Le Grand-Bornand	12.5 km Mass Start	(Norway) Tiril Eckhoff	(Italy) Dorothea Wierer	(Sweden) Linn Persson	(Italy) Dorothea Wierer	Detail
4	9 January 2020	(Germany) Oberhof	7.5 km Sprint	(Norway) Marte Olsbu Røiseland	(Germany) Denise Herrmann	(France) Julia Simon	(Italy) Dorothea Wierer	Detail
4	12 January 2020	(Germany) Oberhof	12.5 km Mass Start	(Finland) Kaisa Mäkäräinen	(Norway) Tiril Eckhoff	(Norway) Marte Olsbu Røiseland	(Italy) Dorothea Wierer	Detail
5	15 January 2020	(Germany) Ruhpolding	7.5 km Sprint	(Norway) Tiril Eckhoff	(Sweden) Hanna Öberg	(Italy) Dorothea Wierer	(Norway) Tiril Eckhoff	Detail
5	19 January 2020	(Germany) Ruhpolding	10 km Pursuit	(Norway) Tiril Eckhoff	(Slovakia) Paulína Fialková	(Sweden) Hanna Öberg	(Norway) Tiril Eckhoff	Detail
6	24 January 2020	(Slovenia) Pokljuka	15 km Individual	(Germany) Denise Herrmann	(Sweden) Hanna Öberg	(France) Anaïs Bescond	(Norway) Tiril Eckhoff	Detail
6	26 January 2020	(Slovenia) Pokljuka	12.5 km Mass Start	(Sweden) Hanna Öberg	(Italy) Lisa Vittozzi	(France) Anaïs Bescond	(Norway) Tiril Eckhoff	Detail
WC	14 February 2020	(Italy) Antholz-Anterselva	7.5 km Sprint	(Norway) Marte Olsbu Røiseland	(United States) Susan Dunklee	(Czech Republic) Lucie Charvátová	(Italy) Dorothea Wierer	Detail
WC	16 February 2020	(Italy) Antholz-Anterselva	10 km Pursuit	(Italy) Dorothea Wierer	(Germany) Denise Herrmann	(Norway) Marte Olsbu Røiseland	(Italy) Dorothea Wierer	Detail
WC	18 February 2020	(Italy) Antholz-Anterselva	15 km Individual	(Italy) Dorothea Wierer	(Germany) Vanessa Hinz	(Norway) Marte Olsbu Røiseland	(Italy) Dorothea Wierer	Detail
WC	23 February 2020	(Italy) Antholz-Anterselva	12.5 km Mass Start	(Norway) Marte Olsbu Røiseland	(Italy) Dorothea Wierer	(Sweden) Hanna Öberg	(Italy) Dorothea Wierer	Detail
7	5 March 2020	(Czech Republic) Nové Město na M.	7.5 km Sprint	(Germany) Denise Herrmann	(France) Anaïs Bescond	(Czech Republic) Markéta Davidová	(Italy) Dorothea Wierer	Detail
7	8 March 2020	(Czech Republic) Nové Město na M.	12.5 km Mass Start	(Norway) Tiril Eckhoff	(Sweden) Hanna Öberg	(Germany) Franziska Preuß	(Italy) Dorothea Wierer	Detail
8	13 March 2020	(Finland) Kontiolahti	7.5 km Sprint	(Germany) Denise Herrmann	(Germany) Franziska Preuß	(Norway) Tiril Eckhoff	(Italy) Dorothea Wierer	Detail
8	14 March 2020	(Finland) Kontiolahti	10 km Pursuit	(France) Julia Simon	(Switzerland) Selina Gasparin	(Italy) Lisa Vittozzi	(Italy) Dorothea Wierer	Detail
9	20 March 2020	(Norway) Oslo Holmenkollen	7.5 km Sprint	Cancelled due to the outbreak of COVID-19				
9	21 March 2020	(Norway) Oslo Holmenkollen	10 km Pursuit	Cancelled due to the outbreak of COVID-19				
9	22 March 2020	(Norway) Oslo Holmenkollen	12.5 km Mass Start	Cancelled due to the outbreak of COVID-19				

=== Men's team ===
Stage	Date	Place	Discipline	Winner	Second	Third	Det.
1	7 December 2019	(Sweden) Östersund	4x7.5 km Relay	Norway Johannes Dale; Erlend Bjøntegaard; Tarjei Bø; Johannes Thingnes Bø	France Émilien Jacquelin; Quentin Fillon Maillet; Simon Desthieux; Martin Fourcade	Italy Lukas Hofer; Thomas Bormolini; Daniele Cappellari; Dominik Windisch	Detail
2	15 December 2019	(Austria) Hochfilzen	4x7.5 km Relay	Norway Johannes Dale; Erlend Bjøntegaard; Tarjei Bø; Johannes Thingnes Bø	Germany Philipp Horn; Johannes Kühn; Arnd Peiffer; Benedikt Doll	France Antonin Guigonnat; Émilien Jacquelin; Fabien Claude; Quentin Fillon Maillet	Detail
4	11 January 2020	(Germany) Oberhof	4x7.5 km Relay	Norway Lars Helge Birkeland; Erlend Bjøntegaard; Johannes Dale; Vetle Sjåstad Christiansen	France Émilien Jacquelin; Martin Fourcade; Simon Desthieux; Quentin Fillon Maillet	Germany Philipp Horn; Johannes Kühn; Arnd Peiffer; Benedikt Doll	Detail
5	18 January 2020	(Germany) Ruhpolding	4x7.5 km Relay	France Émilien Jacquelin; Martin Fourcade; Simon Desthieux; Quentin Fillon Maillet	Norway Johannes Dale; Erlend Bjøntegaard; Tarjei Bø; Vetle Sjåstad Christiansen	Austria Dominik Landertinger; Simon Eder; Felix Leitner; Julian Eberhard	Detail
WC	22 February 2020	(Italy) Antholz-Anterselva	4x7.5 km Relay	France Émilien Jacquelin; Martin Fourcade; Simon Desthieux; Quentin Fillon Maillet	Norway Vetle Sjåstad Christiansen; Johannes Dale; Tarjei Bø; Johannes Thingnes Bø	Germany Erik Lesser; Philipp Horn; Arnd Peiffer; Benedikt Doll	Detail
7	7 March 2020	(Czech Republic) Nové Město	4x7.5 km Relay	Norway Vetle Sjåstad Christiansen; Johannes Dale; Tarjei Bø; Johannes Thingnes Bø	Ukraine Artem Pryma; Sergii Semenov; Ruslan Tkalenko; Dmytro Pidruchnyi	Sweden Sebastian Samuelsson; Jesper Nelin; Peppe Femling; Martin Ponsiluoma	Detail

=== Women's team ===
Stage	Date	Place	Discipline	Winner	Second	Third	Det.
1	8 December 2019	(Sweden) Östersund	4x6 km Relay	Norway Karoline Offigstad Knotten; Ingrid Landmark Tandrevold; Tiril Eckhoff; Marte Olsbu Røiseland	Switzerland Elisa Gasparin; Selina Gasparin; Aita Gasparin; Lena Häcki	Sweden Linn Persson; Elvira Öberg; Mona Brorsson; Hanna Öberg	Detail
2	14 December 2019	(Austria) Hochfilzen	4x6 km Relay	Norway Karoline Offigstad Knotten; Ingrid Landmark Tandrevold; Tiril Eckhoff; Marte Olsbu Røiseland	Russia Kristina Reztsova; Larisa Kuklina; Svetlana Mironova; Ekaterina Yurlova-Percht	Switzerland Elisa Gasparin; Selina Gasparin; Aita Gasparin; Lena Häcki	Detail
4	11 January 2020	(Germany) Oberhof	4x6 km Relay	Norway Synnøve Solemdal; Ingrid Landmark Tandrevold; Marte Olsbu Røiseland; Tiril Eckhoff	Sweden Elvira Öberg; Linn Persson; Mona Brorsson; Hanna Öberg	France Julia Simon; Anaïs Bescond; Célia Aymonier; Justine Braisaz	Detail
5	17 January 2020	(Germany) Ruhpolding	4x6 km Relay	Norway Karoline Offigstad Knotten; Ingrid Landmark Tandrevold; Tiril Eckhoff; Marte Olsbu Røiseland	France Julia Simon; Anaïs Bescond; Célia Aymonier; Justine Braisaz	Switzerland Elisa Gasparin; Selina Gasparin; Aita Gasparin; Lena Häcki	Detail
WC	22 February 2020	(Italy) Antholz-Anterselva	4x6 km Relay	Norway Synnøve Solemdal; Ingrid Landmark Tandrevold; Tiril Eckhoff; Marte Olsbu Røiseland	Germany Karolin Horchler; Vanessa Hinz; Franziska Preuß; Denise Herrmann	Ukraine Anastasiya Merkushyna; Yuliia Dzhima; Vita Semerenko; Olena Pidhrushna	Detail
7	7 March 2020	(Czech Republic) Nové Město	4x6 km Relay	Norway Karoline Offigstad Knotten; Ida Lien; Ingrid Landmark Tandrevold; Tiril Eckhoff	France Julia Simon; Justine Braisaz; Chloé Chevalier; Anaïs Bescond	Germany Karolin Horchler; Vanessa Hinz; Franziska Preuß; Denise Herrmann	Detail

=== Mixed ===
Stage	Date	Place	Discipline	Winner	Second	Third	Det.
1	30 November 2019	(Sweden) Östersund	1x6 km + 1x7.5 km Single Mixed Relay	Sweden Hanna Öberg; Sebastian Samuelsson	Germany Erik Lesser; Franziska Preuß	Norway Vetle Sjåstad Christiansen; Marte Olsbu Røiseland	Detail
1	30 November 2019	(Sweden) Östersund	4x6 km Mixed Relay	Italy Lisa Vittozzi; Dorothea Wierer; Lukas Hofer; Dominik Windisch	Norway Ingrid Landmark Tandrevold; Tiril Eckhoff; Tarjei Bø; Johannes Thingnes Bø	Sweden Linn Persson; Mona Brorsson; Jesper Nelin; Martin Ponsiluoma	Detail
6	25 January 2020	(Slovenia) Pokljuka	1x6 km + 1x7.5 km Single Mixed Relay	France Émilien Jacquelin; Anaïs Bescond	Estonia Rene Zahkna; Regina Oja	Austria Simon Eder; Lisa Theresa Hauser	Detail
6	25 January 2020	(Slovenia) Pokljuka	4x7.5 km Mixed Relay	France Quentin Fillon Maillet; Simon Desthieux; Justine Braisaz; Julia Simon	Norway Tarjei Bø; Johannes Thingnes Bø; Synnoeve Solemdal; Ingrid Landmark Tandrevold	Germany Philipp Horn; Johannes Kühn; Janina Hettich; Vanessa Hinz	Detail
WC	13 February 2020	(Italy) Antholz-Anterselva	4x6 km Mixed Relay	Norway Marte Olsbu Røiseland; Tiril Eckhoff; Tarjei Bø; Johannes Thingnes Bø	Italy Lisa Vittozzi; Dorothea Wierer; Lukas Hofer; Dominik Windisch	Czech Republic Eva Kristejn Puskarčíková; Markéta Davidová; Ondřej Moravec; Michal Krčmář	Detail
WC	20 February 2020	(Italy) Antholz-Anterselva	1x6 km + 1x7.5 km Single Mixed Relay	Norway Marte Olsbu Røiseland; Johannes Thingnes Bø	Germany Franziska Preuß; Erik Lesser	France Anaïs Bescond; Émilien Jacquelin	Detail

== Standings (men) ==
=== Overall ===
Pos.		Points
1.	(Norway) Johannes Thingnes Bø	913
2.	(France) Martin Fourcade	911
3.	(France) Quentin Fillon Maillet	843
4.	(Norway) Tarjei Bø	740
5.	(France) Emilien Jacquelin	726

- Final standings after 21 races.

=== Individual ===
Pos.		Points
1.	(France) Martin Fourcade	174
2.	(Norway) Johannes Thingnes Bø	145
3.	(France) Quentin Fillon Maillet	120
4.	(Norway) Tarjei Bø	114
5.	(France) Fabien Claude	107

- Final standings after 3 races.

=== Sprint ===
Pos.		Points
1.	(France) Martin Fourcade	360
2.	(France) Quentin Fillon Maillet	324
3.	(Norway) Johannes Thingnes Bø	323
4.	(Norway) Tarjei Bø	307
5.	(France) Simon Desthieux	284

- Final standings after 8 races.

=== Pursuit ===
Pos.		Points
1.	(France) Emilien Jacquelin	232
2.	(France) Martin Fourcade	230
3.	(France) Quentin Fillon Maillet	230
4.	(Norway) Johannes Thingnes Bø	217
5.	(Russia) Alexandr Loginov	197

- Final standings after 5 races.

=== Mass start ===
Pos.		Points
1.	(Norway) Johannes Thingnes Bø	228
2.	(France) Quentin Fillon Maillet	216
3.	(France) Martin Fourcade	203
4.	(Norway) Johannes Dale	189
5.	(Germany) Arnd Peiffer	186

- Final standings after 5 races.

=== Relay ===
Pos.		Points
1.	Norway	348
2.	France	302
3.	Germany	264
4.	Russia	253
5.	Ukraine	216

- Final standings after 6 races.

=== Nation ===
Pos.		Points
1.	Norway	8192
2.	France	7885
3.	Germany	7211
4.	Russia	6896
5.	Austria	5982

- Final standings after 23 races.

== Standings (women) ==
=== Overall ===
Pos.		Points
1.	(Italy) Dorothea Wierer	793
2.	(Norway) Tiril Eckhoff	786
3.	(Germany) Denise Herrmann	745
4.	(Sweden) Hanna Öberg	741
5.	(Norway) Marte Olsbu Røiseland	597

- Final standings after 21 races.

=== Individual ===
Pos.		Points
1.	(Sweden) Hanna Öberg	128
2.	(Italy) Dorothea Wierer	114
3.	(France) Justine Braisaz	112
4.	(Germany) Denise Herrmann	112
5.	(Germany) Franziska Preuß	109

- Final standings after 3 races.

=== Sprint ===
Pos.		Points
1.	(Germany) Denise Herrmann	314
2.	(Italy) Dorothea Wierer	305
3.	(Norway) Tiril Eckhoff	283
4.	(Norway) Marte Olsbu Røiseland	248
5.	(Sweden) Hanna Öberg	245

- Final standings after 8 races.

=== Pursuit ===
Pos.		Points
1.	(Norway) Tiril Eckhoff	232
2.	(Italy) Dorothea Wierer	186
3.	(Norway) Ingrid Landmark Tandrevold	185
4.	(Sweden) Hanna Öberg	168
5.	(Germany) Denise Herrmann	155

- Final standings after 5 races.

=== Mass start ===
Pos.		Points
1.	(Italy) Dorothea Wierer	223
2.	(Norway) Tiril Eckhoff	210
3.	(Sweden) Hanna Öberg	200
4.	(Finland) Kaisa Mäkäräinen	195
5.	(France) Anaïs Bescond	172

- Final standings after 5 races.

=== Relay ===
Pos.		Points
1.	Norway	360
2.	Switzerland	260
2.	Germany	260
4.	France	257
5.	Sweden	249

- Final standings after 6 races.

=== Nation ===
Pos.		Points
1.	Norway	7865
2.	Germany	7202
3.	France	7058
4.	Sweden	6896
5.	Russia	6479

- Final standings after 23 races.

== Standings: Mixed ==
=== Mixed relay ===
Pos.		Points
1.	Norway	307
2.	France	272
3.	Germany	265
4.	Sweden	250
5.	Italy	234

- Final standings after 6 races.

== Medal table ==
Rank	Nation	Gold	Silver	Bronze	Total
1	Norway	32	12	11	55
2	France	15	20	16	51
3	Italy	5	4	3	12
4	Germany	4	10	8	22
5	Sweden	2	5	6	13
6	Russia	1	2	4	7
7	Finland	1	0	0	1
8	Switzerland	0	2	3	5
9	Ukraine	0	2	1	3
10	Estonia	0	1	0	1
10	Slovakia	0	1	0	1
10	United States	0	1	0	1
13	Czech Republic	0	0	5	5
14	Austria	0	0	3	3
Totals (14 entries)		60	60	60	180

== Points distribution ==
The table shows the number of points won in the 2019/20 Biathlon World Cup for men and women. Relay events do not impact individual rankings.

Place	1	2	3	4	5	6	7	8	9	10	11	12	13	14	15	16	17	18	19	20	21	22	23	24	25	26	27	28	29	30	31	32	33	34	35	36	37	38	39	40
Individual	60	54	48	43	40	38	36	34	32	31	30	29	28	27	26	25	24	23	22	21	20	19	18	17	16	15	14	13	12	11	10	9	8	7	6	5	4	3	2	1
Sprint	60	54	48	43	40	38	36	34	32	31	30	29	28	27	26	25	24	23	22	21	20	19	18	17	16	15	14	13	12	11	10	9	8	7	6	5	4	3	2	1
Pursuit	60	54	48	43	40	38	36	34	32	31	30	29	28	27	26	25	24	23	22	21	20	19	18	17	16	15	14	13	12	11	10	9	8	7	6	5	4	3	2	1
Mass Start	60	54	48	43	40	38	36	34	32	31	30	29	28	27	26	25	24	23	22	21	20	18	16	14	12	10	8	6	4	2

== Achievements ==
First World Cup career victory

Men

- Émilien Jacquelin (FRA), 24, in his 3rd season — World Championships Pursuit in Antholz-Anterselva; first podium was 2019–20 Pursuit in Hochfilzen

Women

- Julia Simon (FRA), 23, in her 4th season — Stage 8 Pursuit in Kontiolahti; first podium was 2019–20 Individual in Östersund

First World Cup podium

Men

- Matvey Eliseev (RUS), 26, in his 6th season — no. 3 in the Stage 1 Sprint in Östersund
- Émilien Jacquelin (FRA), 24, in his 3rd season — no. 3 in the Stage 2 Pursuit in Hochfilzen
- Fabien Claude (FRA), 25, in his 3rd season — no. 3 in the Stage 6 Individual in Pokljuka

Women

- Julia Simon (FRA), 23, in her 4th season — no. 3 in the Stage 1 Individual in Östersund
- Svetlana Mironova (RUS), 25, in her 4th season — no. 3 in the Stage 2 Sprint in Hochfilzen
- Lena Häcki (SUI), 24, in her 6th season — no. 3 in the Stage 3 Pursuit in Le Grand-Bornand
- Linn Persson (SWE), 25, in her 5th season — no. 3 in the Stage 3 Mass Start in Le Grand-Bornand
- Lucie Charvátová (CZE), 27, in her 7th season — no. 3 in the World Championships Sprint in Antholz-Anterselva

Team

Men

-

Mixed

- Estonia - no. 2 in Stage 6 Single Mixed Relay in Pokljuka

Women

- Switzerland — no. 2 in Stage 1 Women's Relay in Östersund

Victory in this World Cup (all-time number of victories in parentheses)

Men

- Johannes Thingnes Bø (NOR), 10 (47) first places
- Martin Fourcade (FRA), 7 (79) first places
- Quentin Fillon Maillet (FRA), 1 (3) first place
- Benedikt Doll (GER), 1 (2) first place
- Alexandr Loginov (RUS), 1 (2) first place
- Émilien Jacquelin (FRA), 1 (1) first place

Women

- Tiril Eckhoff (NOR), 7 (13) first places
- Dorothea Wierer (ITA), 4 (11) first places
- Denise Herrmann (GER), 3 (7) first places
- Marte Olsbu Røiseland (NOR), 3 (6) first places
- Kaisa Mäkäräinen (FIN), 1 (27) first place
- Hanna Öberg (SWE), 1 (3) first place
- Justine Braisaz (FRA), 1 (2) first place
- Julia Simon (FRA), 1 (1) first place

== Retirements ==
The following notable biathletes retired during or after the 2019–20 season:

Men

- Dominik Landertinger (AUT)
- Krasimir Anev (BUL)
- Woojin Wang (CHN)
- Ondřej Hošek (CZE)
- Michal Šlesingr (CZE)
- Tuukka Invenius (FIN)
- Aristide Bègue (FRA)
- Martin Fourcade (FRA)
- Thierry Chenal (ITA)
- Timur Kuts (KAZ)
- Vladislav Vitenko (KAZ)
- Roman Yeremin (KAZ)
- Petr Yermolenko (KAZ)
- Lee In-bok (KOR)
- Rokas Suslavicius (LTU)
- Fredrik Gjesbakk (NOR)
- Mateusz Janik (POL)
- Denis Serban (ROU)
- Dmitry Malyshko (RUS)
- Alexey Volkov (RUS)
- Mario Dolder (SUI)
- Martin Otčenáš (SVK)
- Travis Cooper (USA)
- Alex Howe (USA)

Women

- Ramona Dueringer (AUT)
- Fabienne Hartweger (AUT)
- Simone Kupfner (AUT)
- Anna-Maria Schreder (AUT)
- Hongru Chen (CHN)
- Qu Ying (CHN)
- Veronika Vítková (CZE)
- Meril Beilmann (EST)
- Kaisa Mäkäräinen (FIN)
- Célia Aymonier (FRA)
- Myrtille Bègue (FRA)
- Marie Heinrich (GER)
- Nadine Horchler (GER)
- Alexia Runggaldier (ITA)
- Ji-ae Park (KOR)
- Julija Matvijenko (LAT)
- Synnøve Solemdal (NOR)
- Thekla Brun-Lie (NOR)
- Terézia Poliaková (SVK)
- Urška Poje (SLO)
- Linn Larsson (SWE)
- Chardine Sloof (SWE)
- Iana Bondar (UKR)
- Emily Dreissigacker (USA)
