= Stage 4 =

Stage 4 may refer to:

- Stage 4 of Everywhere at the End of Time
- Cambrian Stage 4
- Stage 4 cancer
- Stage 4 CKD
- Stage 4 of Braak staging
- Decomposition stage 4
- Whale fall stage 4
- 2019–20 Biathlon World Cup – Stage 4
- 2021 Call of Duty League season stage 4

== See also ==
- Piaget's 4 stages of cognitive development
