= Stage 3 =

Stage 3 may refer to:

- Stage 3 of Everywhere at the End of Time, album track by the Caretaker
- Cambrian Stage 3, geological period
- Stage 3 cancer
- Stage 3 CKD (chronic kidney disease)
- Stage 3 of Braak staging, used in the assessment of Parkinson's disease
- Decomposition stage 3
- Whale fall stage 3
- 2019–20 Biathlon World Cup – Stage 3
- 2021 Call of Duty League season stage 3

== See also ==
- Third in Piaget's 4 stages of cognitive development
