= Regina Ermits =

Estonian biathlete (born 1996)

Regina Oja
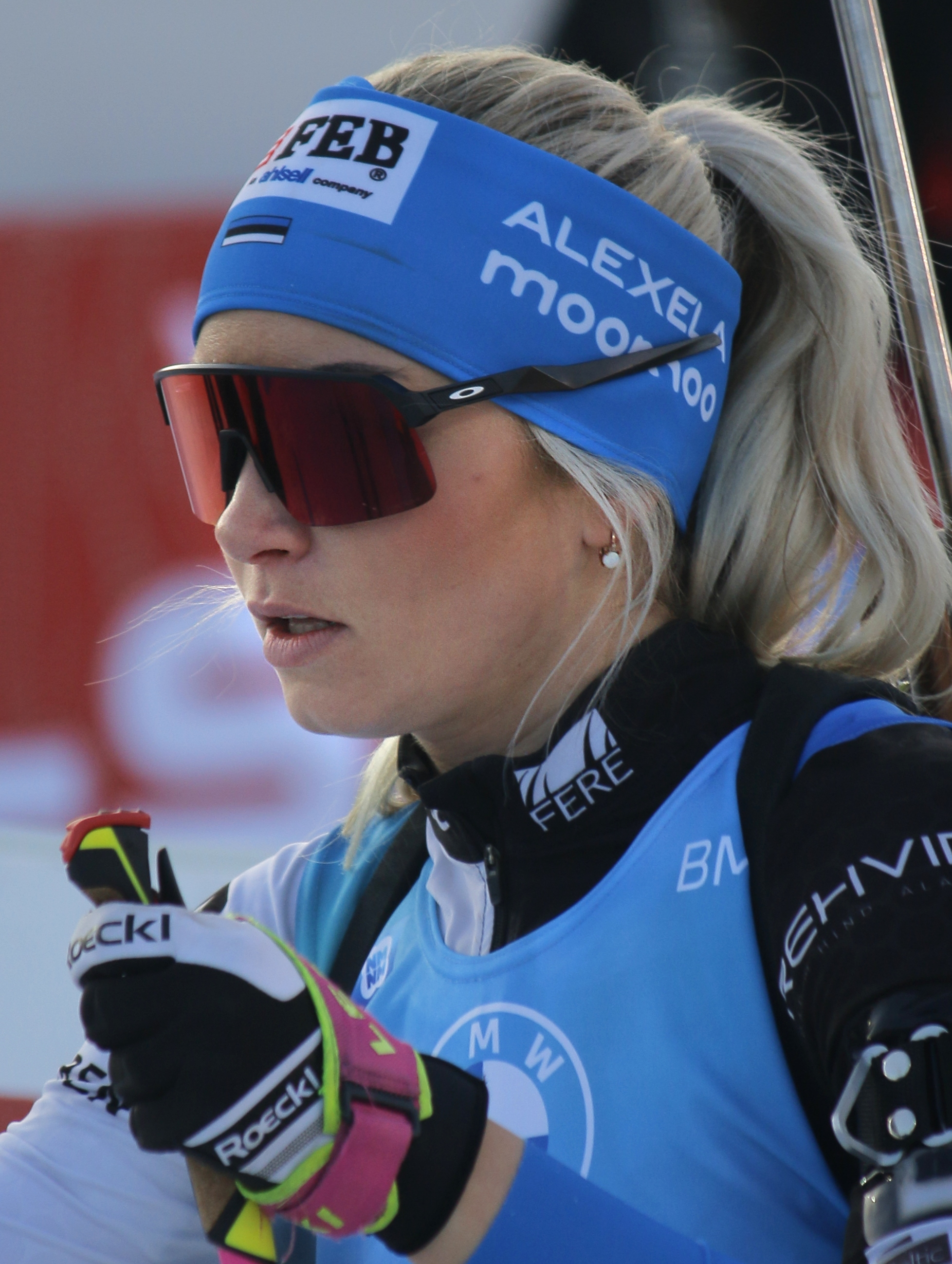
- Regina Ermits in Nové Město in March 2023

Personal information
- Born: 31 January 1996 (age 30) Tallinn, Estonia

Sport

Professional information
- World Cup debut: 17 Jan 2016 (in relay); 29 Nov 2017 (in indiv.)

World Championships
- Teams: 3 (2019–2021)

World Cup
- Seasons: 4 (2017–18–)
- Individual races: 47
- All races: 74
- Individual victories: 0
- All victories: 0
- Individual podiums: 0
- All podiums: 1

Regina Ermits (born Regina Oja 31 January 1996) is an Estonian biathlete. She competes in the Biathlon World Cup.

She achieved her best results in the Biathlon World Cup at Pokljuka, when she finished second in the single mixed relay event with her compatriot Rene Zahkna.

== Personal ==
Her father is former biathlete Kristjan Oja. She is married to former biathlete Kalev Ermits.

== Biathlon results ==
All results are sourced from the International Biathlon Union.

=== Olympic Games ===
Event	Individual	Sprint	Pursuit	Mass start	Relay	Mixed relay
(China) 2022 Beijing	79th	56th	50th	—	15th	16th
(Italy) 2026 Milano Cortina	50th	69th	—	—	14th	15th

=== World Championships ===
Event	Individual	Sprint	Pursuit	Mass start	Relay	Mixed relay	Single mixed relay
(Sweden) 2019 Östersund	59th	81st	—	—	12th	14th	—
(Italy) 2020 Antholz-Anterselva	68th	30th	48th	—	DSQ	15th	12th
(Slovenia) 2021 Pokljuka	62nd	83rd	—	—	17th	—	—
(Germany) 2023 Oberhof	73rd	64th	—	—	10th	—	—
(Czech Republic) 2024 Nové Město	13th	25th	24th	12th	4th	12th	—
(Switzerland) 2025 Lenzerheide	60th	51st	25th	—	10th	13th	15th

=== World Cup ===
Season	Overall		Individual		Sprint		Pursuit		Mass start	
Season	Points	Position	Points	Position	Points	Position	Points	Position	Points	Position
2018–19	41	76th	19	46th	12	82nd	10	77th	—	—
2019–20	71	54th	—	—	60	44th	5	68th	6	46th
2020–21	Didn't earn World Cup point									
2021–22	65	51st	—	—	42	43rd	23	49th	—	—
2022–23	Didn't earn World Cup point									
2023–24	75	48th	—	—	52	41st	23	54th	—	—

==== Team podiums ====
- 1 podiums

No.	Season	Date	Location	Race	Place	Team
1	2019–20	25 January 2020	(Slovenia) Pokljuka	Single Mixed Relay	2nd	Zahkna / Oja

*Results are from IBU races which include the Biathlon World Cup, Biathlon World Championships and the Winter Olympic Games.

Updated on 22 March 2021

=== Other competition ===
==== European Championships ====
Event	Level	Individual	Sprint	Pursuit	Mixed relay	Single mixed relay	Super sprint
(Estonia) 2015 Otepää	Junior	21st	13th	14th	—	—N/a	—N/a
(Italy) 2018 Ridnaun	Senior	66th	19th	29th	—	4th	—N/a
(Belarus) 2020 Minsk	Senior	—N/a	DNS	—	6th	—	48th
(Poland) 2021 Duszniki-Zdrój	Senior	39th	83rd	—	15th	—	—N/a

==== Junior/Youth World Championships ====
Event	Level	Individual	Sprint	Pursuit	Relay
(Italy) 2013 Obertilliach	Youth	14th	49th	53rd	4th
(United States) 2014 Presque Isle	Youth	17th	30th	35th	4th
(Belarus) 2015 Minsk	Youth	22nd	38th	17th	8th
(Romania) 2016 Cheile Grădiştei	Junior	46th	47th	49th	9th
(Slovakia) 2017 Brezno	Junior	45th	DNF	—	—

== See also ==
- List of professional sports families
