= Martin Otčenáš =

Slovak biathlete (born 1987)

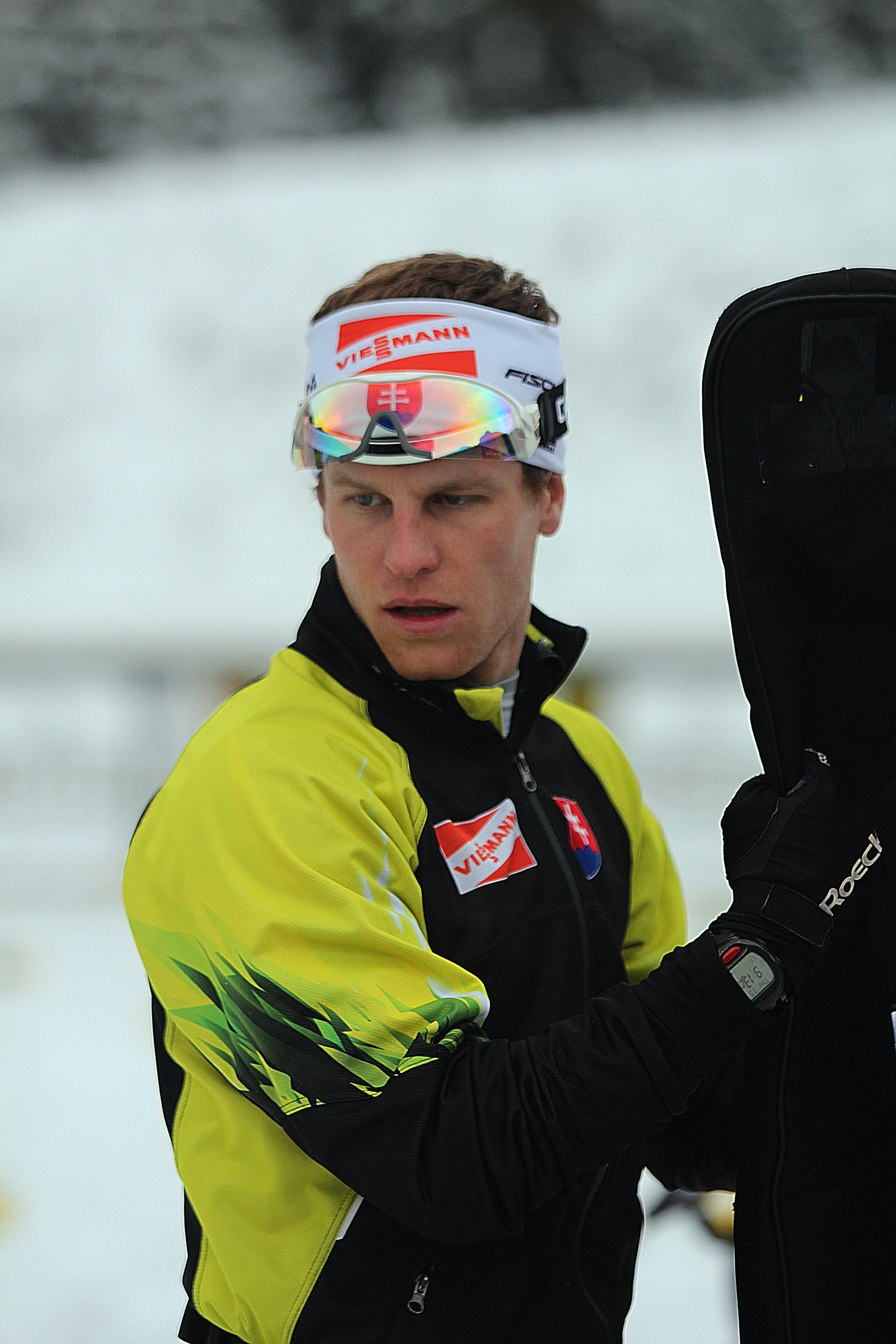

Personal information
- Born: 25 August 1987 (age 38) Poprad, Czechoslovakia
- Height: 5 ft 11 in (180 cm)

Sport
- Sport: Skiing
- Club: ŠKP Štrbské Pleso
Medal record
Men's cross-country skiing
Representing Slovakia
European Youth Olympic Winter Festival
Gold medal – first place	2005 Monthey	Mixed 4 x 5 km relay
- Updated on 8 July 2021

Martin Otčenáš (born 25 August 1987) is a Slovak former biathlete and cross-country skier. He competed at the 2014 Winter Olympics in Sochi, in sprint and individual.

== Personal life ==
Since April 2017, Martin Otčenáš has been married to former Ukrainian biathlete Natalya Otčenáš (née Burdyga).

== Biathlon results ==
All results are sourced from the International Biathlon Union.

=== Olympic Games ===
0 medals

Event	Individual	Sprint	Pursuit	Mass start	Relay	Mixed relay
(Russia) 2014 Sochi	—	67th	—	—	—	—
(South Korea) 2018 Pyeongchang	84th	52nd	27th	—	18th	20th

*The mixed relay was added as an event in 2014.

=== World Championships ===
0 medals

Event	Individual	Sprint	Pursuit	Mass start	Relay	Mixed relay
(Russia) 2011 Khanty-Mansiysk	—	—	—	—	18th	—
(Germany) 2012 Ruhpolding	66th	—	—	—	12th	—
(Czech Republic) 2013 Nové Město	—	91st	—	—	—	—
(Finland) 2015 Kontiolahti	88th	65th	—	—	11th	17th
(Norway) 2016 Oslo Holmenkollen	63rd	25th	30th	—	12th	17th
(Austria) 2017 Hochfilzen	65th	47th	24th	—	12th	12th

*During Olympic seasons competitions are only held for those events not included in the Olympic program.
**The mixed relay was added as an event in 2005.
