= 2019–20 Biathlon World Cup – Stage 2 =

The 2019–20 Biathlon World Cup – Stage 2 was the second event of the season and is held in Hochfilzen, Austria, from 13 to 15 December 2019.

== Schedule of events ==
The events took place at the following times.

| Date | Time | Events |
|---|---|---|
| 13 December | 11:30 CET | Women's 7.5 km Sprint |
| 13 December | 14:20 CET | Men's 10 km Sprint |
| 14 December | 11:30 CET | 4 x 6 km Women's Relay |
| 14 December | 14:55 CET | Men's 12.5 km Pursuit |
| 15 December | 12:00 CET | Women's 10 km Pursuit |
| 15 December | 14:15 CET | 4 x 7.5 km Men's Relay |

== Medal winners ==
=== Men ===
| Event: | Gold: | Time | Silver: | Time | Bronze: | Time |
|---|---|---|---|---|---|---|
| 10 km Sprint | Johannes Thingnes Bø; Norway | 25:07.8 (0+1) | Simon Desthieux; France | 25:15.6 (0+1) | Alexander Loginov; Russia | 25:22.4 (0+0) |
| 12.5 km Pursuit | Johannes Thingnes Bø; Norway | 31:27.0 (0+0+0+0) | Alexander Loginov; Russia | 32:00.5 (0+0+0+0) | Émilien Jacquelin; France | 32:07.5 (0+0+0+0) |
| 4 x 7.5 km Men Relay | Norway; Johannes Dale; Erlend Bjøntegaard; Tarjei Bø; Johannes Thingnes Bø | 1:14:44.2 (0+0) (0+0) (1+3) (0+2) (0+0) (0+0) (0+0) (0+2) | Germany; Philipp Horn; Johannes Kühn; Arnd Peiffer; Benedikt Doll | 1:14:46.2 (0+2) (0+2) (0+0) (0+0) (0+0) (0+0) (0+0) (0+2) | France; Antonin Guigonnat; Émilien Jacquelin; Fabien Claude; Quentin Fillon Maillet | 1:15:36.1 (0+2) (0+0) (0+0) (0+2) (0+0) (1+3) (0+1) (0+0) |

=== Women ===
| Event: | Gold: | Time | Silver: | Time | Bronze: | Time |
|---|---|---|---|---|---|---|
| 7.5 km Sprint | Dorothea Wierer; Italy | 21:26.5 (1+0) | Ingrid Landmark Tandrevold; Norway | 21:32.4 (0+0) | Svetlana Mironova; Russia | 21:44.8 (0+1) |
| 10 km Pursuit | Tiril Eckhoff; Norway | 29:14.6 (0+0+0+0) | Hanna Öberg; Sweden | 29:40.4 (0+1+1+0) | Ingrid Landmark Tandrevold; Norway | 29:54.3 (0+0+1+0) |
| 4 x 6 km Women Relay | Norway; Karoline Offigstad Knotten; Ingrid Landmark Tandrevold; Tiril Eckhoff; Marte Olsbu Røiseland | 1:10:04.7 (0+0) (0+1) (0+0) (1+3) (0+1) (0+1) (0+0) (0+1) | Russia; Kristina Reztsova; Larisa Kuklina; Svetlana Mironova; Ekaterina Yurlova-Percht | 1:10:12.9 (0+0) (0+0) (0+0) (0+1) (0+0) (0+3) (0+0) (0+1) | Switzerland; Elisa Gasparin; Selina Gasparin; Aita Gasparin; Lena Häcki | 1:11:08.8 (0+1) (0+1) (0+3) (0+1) (0+0) (0+0) (0+0) (1+3) |
