= 2019–20 Biathlon World Cup – Stage 8 =

The 2019–20 Biathlon World Cup – Stage 8 was the eighth event of the season and is held in Kontiolahti, Finland, from 12 to 14 March 2020. Originally, two relay races would have been held on March 15, but this was canceled due to the COVID-19 pandemic.

== Schedule of events ==
The events took place at the following times.

Date	Time	Events
12 March	15:30 CET	Men's 10 km Sprint
13 March	15:30 CET	Women's 7.5 km Sprint
14 March	13:45 CET	Men's 12.5 km Pursuit
14 March	15:45 CET	Women's 10 km Pursuit
15 March	13:20 CET	Single Mixed Relay
15 March	15:15 CET	Mixed 4 x 7.5 km Relay

== Medal winners ==
=== Men ===
Event:	Gold:	Time	Silver:	Time	Bronze:	Time
10 km Sprint	Johannes Thingnes Bø; Norway	22:27.8 (0+0)	Martin Fourcade; France	22:48.9 (0+0)	Émilien Jacquelin; France	22:50.1 (0+0)
12.5 km Pursuit	Martin Fourcade; France	31:25.4 (0+0+1+2)	Quentin Fillon Maillet; France	31:28.3 (1+0+0+1)	Émilien Jacquelin; France	31:29.9 (0+0+1+3)

=== Women ===
Event:	Gold:	Time	Silver:	Time	Bronze:	Time
7.5 km Sprint	Denise Herrmann; Germany	20:00.5 (0+1)	Franziska Preuß; Germany	20:20.6 (1+0)	Tiril Eckhoff; Norway	20:32.8 (1+1)
10 km Pursuit	Julia Simon; France	30:43.5 (0+1+1+0)	Selina Gasparin; Switzerland	31:00.8 (1+2+1+0)	Lisa Vittozzi; Italy	31:04.4 (1+1+1+1)

=== Mixed ===
Event:	Gold:	Time	Silver:	Time	Bronze:	Time
6 km + 7.5 km Single Mixed Relay; Cancelled	Due to the COVID-19 pandemic the competition was cancelled					
4 x 7.5 km Mixed Relay; Cancelled	Due to the COVID-19 pandemic the competition was cancelled					
