= 2019–20 Biathlon World Cup – Stage 7 =

The 2019–20 Biathlon World Cup – Stage 7 was the seventh event of the season and is held in Nové Město, Czech Republic, from 5 to 8 March 2020.

== Schedule of events ==
The events took place at the following times.

Date	Time	Events
5 March	17:35 CET	Women's 7.5 km Sprint
6 March	17:30 CET	Men's 10 km Sprint
7 March	14:00 CET	Women's 4 x 6 km Relay
7 March	17:00 CET	Men's 4 x 7.5 km Relay
8 March	11:45 CET	Women's 12.5 km Mass Start
8 March	13:45 CET	Men's 15 km Mass Start

== Medal winners ==
=== Men ===
Event:	Gold:	Time	Silver:	Time	Bronze:	Time
10 km Sprint	Johannes Thingnes Bø; Norway	24:56.8 (0+0)	Quentin Fillon Maillet; France	25:19.6 (0+0)	Tarjei Bø; Norway	25:57.9 (0+0)
15 km Mass Start	Johannes Thingnes Bø; Norway	39:32.7 (1+1+1+0)	Émilien Jacquelin; France	39:47.8 (0+0+0+0)	Arnd Peiffer; Germany	39:57.7 (0+0+0+1)
4 x 7.5 km Men Relay	Norway; Vetle Sjåstad Christiansen; Johannes Dale; Tarjei Bø; Johannes Thingnes Bø	1:10:25.3 (0+1) (0+1) (0+2) (0+0) (0+0) (0+1) (0+0) (0+0)	Ukraine; Artem Pryma; Serhiy Semenov; Ruslan Tkalenko; Dmytro Pidruchnyi	1:11:03.5 (0+0) (0+2) (0+1) (0+0) (0+1) (0+0) (0+0) (0+1)	Sweden; Sebastian Samuelsson; Jesper Nelin; Peppe Femling; Martin Ponsiluoma	1:11:08.6 (0+1) (0+0) (0+0) (1+3) (0+3) (0+0) (0+1) (0+0)

=== Women ===
Event:	Gold:	Time	Silver:	Time	Bronze:	Time
7.5 km Sprint	Denise Herrmann; Germany	18:51.0 (0+0)	Anaïs Bescond; France	19:18.2 (0+0)	Markéta Davidová; Czech Republic	19:40.7 (1+0)
12.5 km Mass Start	Tiril Eckhoff; Norway	34:00.8 (0+0+0+1)	Hanna Öberg; Sweden	34:26.1 (1+0+0+0)	Franziska Preuß; Germany	34:33.2 (1+0+0+0)
4 x 6 km Women Relay	Norway; Karoline Offigstad Knotten; Ida Lien; Ingrid Landmark Tandrevold; Tiril Eckhoff	1:09:14.8 (0+3) (0+1) (0+0) (0+2) (0+1) (0+0) (0+1) (0+0)	France; Julia Simon; Justine Braisaz; Chloé Chevalier; Anaïs Bescond	1:09:43.5 (0+2) (0+3) (0+0) (1+3) (0+0) (0+0) (0+1) (0+1)	Germany; Karolin Horchler; Vanessa Hinz; Franziska Preuß; Denise Herrmann	1:10:11.8 (0+1) (0+3) (0+1) (0+1) (0+0) (1+3) (0+2) (0+3)
