= Svetlana Mironova (biathlete) =

Russian biathlete

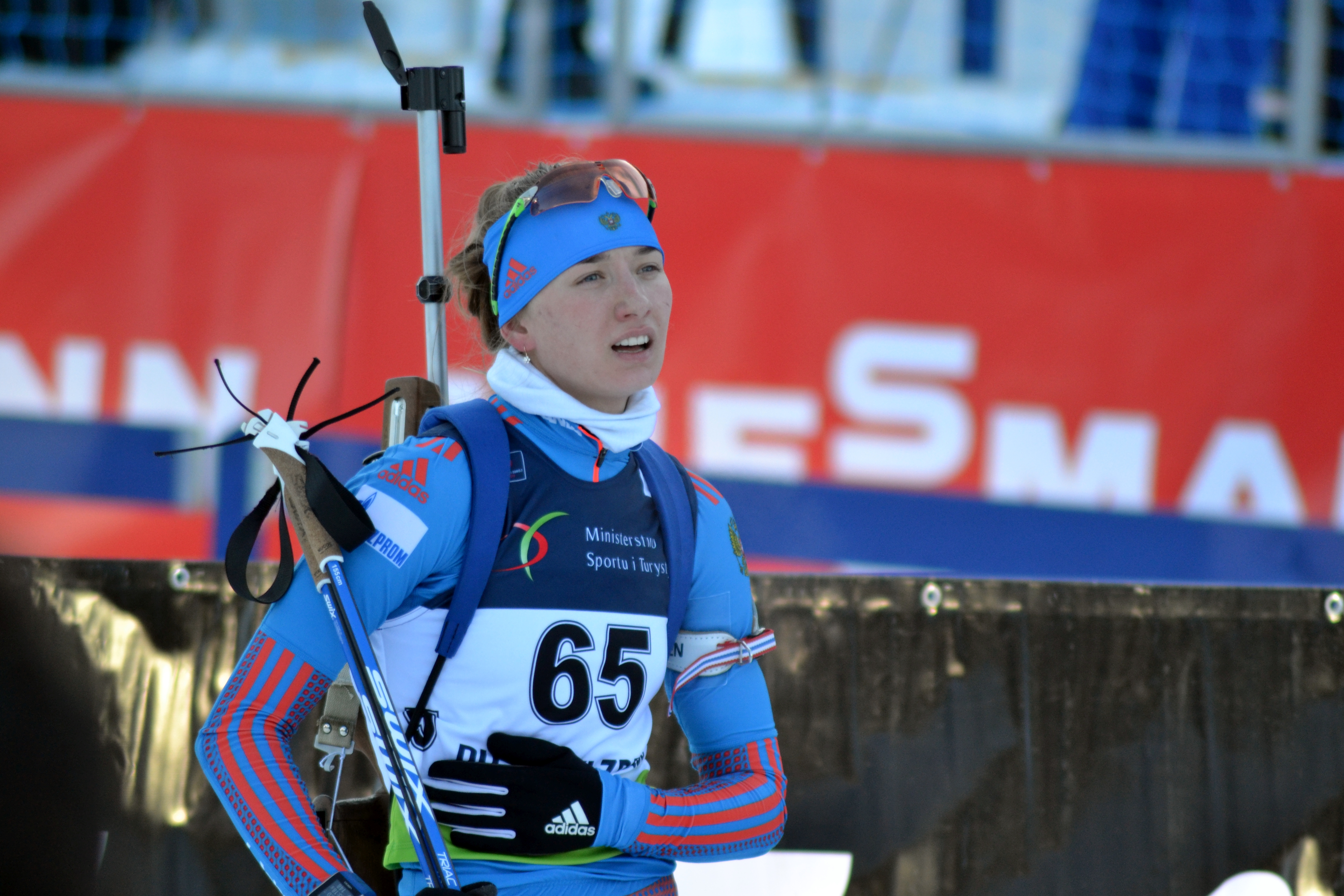
- Mironova in 2017

Personal information
- Native name: Светлана Игоревна Миронова
- Full name: Svetlana Igorevna Mironova
- Nationality: (Russia) Russian
- Born: 22 February 1994 (age 32) Moryakovskiy Zaton, Tomsk Oblast, Russia
- Height: 1.65 m (5 ft 5 in)
- Weight: 52 kg (115 lb)

Sport

Professional information
- Sport: Biathlon
- World Cup debut: 2 March 2017

Olympic Games
- Teams: 1 (2022)
- Medals: 1

World Championships
- Teams: 3 (2019–2021)

World Cup
- Seasons: 5 (2016/17–2021/2022)
- Individual victories: 0
- All victories: 2
- Individual podiums: 1
- All podiums: 4
Medal record
Women's biathlon
Representing ROC
Olympic Games
Silver medal – second place	2022 Beijing	4 × 6 km relay
Representing Russia
Youth World Championships
Gold medal – first place	2013 Obertilliach	3 x 6 km relay
Bronze medal – third place	2013 Obertilliach	6 km sprint
Junior European Championships
Gold medal – first place	2014 Nové Město	10 km pursuit
Silver medal – second place	2014 Nové Město	7.5 km sprint
- Updated on 15 October 2026

Svetlana Igorevna Mironova (Russian: Светлана Игоревна Миронова; born 22 February 1994) is a Russian former biathlete.

== Career ==
Mironova was engaged in cross-country skiing until 2011, when she decided to switch competing in biathlon.

At the 2013 Junior World Championships in Obertilliach, she became the relay champion alongside teammates Victoria Slivko and Uliana Kaisheva. In the same championship, she won bronze in the sprint, was 11th in the pursuit and 24th in the individual race. In 2014, at the U21 European Championships, she took second place in the sprint and became the champion in the pursuit.

Mironova made her World Cup debut in the 2016-17 season in Pyeongchang, finishing 64th in the sprint held on 2 March 2017.

In the 2017-18 season, Mironova took part in seven out of nine stages. Her best result was 9th in the Hochfilzen sprint. By the end of the season, she was named rookie of the year by the International Biathlon Union.

Svetlana competed in the 2019 Biathlon World Championships in Östersund, finishing 31st in the sprint, 25th in the pursuit and 33rd in the individual race.

Mironova made to her first World Cup podium at 13 December 2019 in the sprint race in Hochfilzen. She also finished 2nd at the same stage in the women's relay.

On 10 January 2021, Mironova played an instrumental part in the Russian mixed relay gold medal (alongside Uliana Kaisheva, Alexander Loginov and Eduard Latypov) at the World Cup in Oberhof, ending the anti-record 43-race podiumless streak for the Russian biathletes.

== Biathlon results ==
All results are sourced from the International Biathlon Union.

=== Olympic Games ===
1 medal (1 silver)

Event	Individual	Sprint	Pursuit	Mass start	Relay	Mixed relay
Representing ROC Russian Olympic Committee
(China) 2022 Beijing	23rd	47th	41st	―	Silver	―

=== World Championships ===
Event	Individual	Sprint	Pursuit	Mass start	Relay	Mixed relay	Single mixed relay
Representing Russia
(Sweden) 2019 Östersund	33rd	31st	25th	—	5th	—	—
(Italy) 2020 Antholz-Anterselva	22nd	38th	21st	—	8th	—	—
Representing Russian Biathlon Union
(Slovenia) 2021 Pokljuka	5th	64th	—	19th	11th	9th	—

=== Junior/Youth World Championships ===
2 medals (1 gold, 1 bronze)

Event	Individual	Sprint	Pursuit	Relay
(Austria) 2013 Obertilliach	24th	Bronze	11th	Gold
(United States) 2014 Presque Isle	—	15th	31st	—
