= 2019–20 Biathlon World Cup – Stage 6 =

The 2019–20 Biathlon World Cup – Stage 6 was the sixth event of the season and is held in Pokljuka, Slovenia, from 23 to 26 January 2020.

== Schedule of events ==
The events took place at the following times.

Date	Time	Events
23 January	14:15 CET	Men's 20 km Individual
24 January	14:15 CET	Women's 15 km Individual
25 January	13:15 CET	7.5 km + 6 km Single Mixed Relay
25 January	15:00 CET	4 x 6 km Mixed Relay
26 January	12:15 CET	Men's 15 km Mass Start
26 January	15:00 CET	Women's 12.5 km Mass Start

== Medal winners ==
=== Men ===
Event:	Gold:	Time	Silver:	Time	Bronze:	Time
20 km Individual	Johannes Thingnes Bø; Norway	47:54.3 (0+0+0+0)	Martin Fourcade; France	48:05.7 (0+0+0+0)	Fabien Claude; France	48:19.9 (0+0+0+0)
15 km Mass Start	Quentin Fillon Maillet; France	36:21.5 (0+0+1+0)	Benedikt Doll; Germany	36:31.5 (0+1+0+0)	Johannes Thingnes Bø; Norway	36:31.8 (1+0+0+1)

=== Women ===
Event:	Gold:	Time	Silver:	Time	Bronze:	Time
15 km Individual	Denise Herrmann; Germany	41:33.4 (0+0+0+0)	Hanna Öberg; Sweden	42:32.6 (0+1+0+0)	Anaïs Bescond; France	42:49.1 (0+0+0+0)
12.5 km Mass Start	Hanna Öberg; Sweden	34:14.4 (0+0+1+0)	Lisa Vittozzi; Italy	34:20.9 (0+0+0+0)	Anaïs Bescond; France	34:42.0 (0+0+0+0)

=== Mixed ===
Event:	Gold:	Time	Silver:	Time	Bronze:	Time
7.5 km + 6 km Single Mixed Relay	France; Émilien Jacquelin; Anaïs Bescond	38:33.4 (0+0) (0+0) (0+1) (0+0) (0+1) (0+2) (0+1) (0+0)	Estonia; Rene Zahkna; Regina Oja	38:39.3 (0+0) (0+0) (0+1) (0+0) (0+1) (0+1) (0+0) (0+0)	Austria; Simon Eder; Lisa Theresa Hauser	38:45.5 (0+1) (0+1) (0+1) (0+2) (0+0) (0+0) (0+0) (0+1)
4 x 7.5 km Mixed Relay	France; Quentin Fillon Maillet; Simon Desthieux; Justine Braisaz; Julia Simon	1:17:53.3 (0+1) (0+0) (0+2) (0+0) (0+2) (0+1) (0+1) (0+1)	Norway; Tarjei Bø; Johannes Thingnes Bø; Synnøve Solemdal; Ingrid Landmark Tandrevold	1:18:33.9 (0+0) (0+0) (0+2) (0+0) (0+0) (0+2) (0+0) (0+0)	Germany; Philipp Horn; Johannes Kühn; Janina Hettich; Vanessa Hinz	1:18:54.7 (0+0) (0+0) (0+0) (0+1) (0+0) (0+2) (0+0) (0+1)
