= 2019–20 Biathlon World Cup – Stage 4 =

The 2019–20 Biathlon World Cup – Stage 4 was the fourth event of the season and is held in Oberhof, Germany, from 9 to 12 January 2020.

== Schedule of events ==
The events took place at the following times.

Date	Time	Events
9 January	14:30 CET	Women's 7.5 km Sprint
10 January	14:30 CET	Men's 10 km Sprint (Note: The event was held on the 2.5 km lap used for the Women's 7.5 km Sprint with the men running an additional lap between the two shootings. The change was made due to rainfall the night before the event.)
11 January	12:00 CET	4 x 6 km Women's Relay
11 January	14:15 CET	4 x 7.5 km Men's Relay
12 January	12:45 CET	Women's 12.5 km Mass Start
12 January	14:30 CET	Men's 15 km Mass Start

== Medal winners ==
=== Men ===
Event:	Gold:	Time	Silver:	Time	Bronze:	Time
10 km Sprint	Martin Fourcade; France	25:27.2 (0+0)	Émilien Jacquelin; France	25:52.7 (0+1)	Johannes Kühn; Germany	26:00.2 (0+1)
15 km Mass Start	Martin Fourcade; France	41:01.4 (0+1+0+1)	Arnd Peiffer; Germany	41:21.5 (0+0+2+1)	Simon Desthieux; France	41:21.7 (0+1+0+2)
4 x 7.5 km Men Relay	Norway; Lars Helge Birkeland; Erlend Bjøntegaard; Johannes Dale; Vetle Sjåstad Christiansen	1:19:32.3 (0+0) (0+0) (0+2) (0+0) (0+0) (1+3) (0+0) (1+3)	France; Émilien Jacquelin; Martin Fourcade; Simon Desthieux; Quentin Fillon Maillet	1:19:36.7 (0+1) (2+3) (0+0) (0+0) (0+0) (0+1) (0+0) (0+1)	Germany; Philipp Horn; Johannes Kühn; Arnd Peiffer; Benedikt Doll	1:20:20.5 (0+3) (0+0) (0+0) (1+3) (0+2) (0+3) (0+0) (1+3)

=== Women ===
Event:	Gold:	Time	Silver:	Time	Bronze:	Time
7.5 km Sprint	Marte Olsbu Røiseland; Norway	22:04.9 (0+0)	Denise Herrmann; Germany	22:38.0 (0+1)	Julia Simon; France	22:52.3 (1+0)
12.5 km Mass Start	Kaisa Mäkäräinen; Finland	39:58.9 (1+0+0+0)	Tiril Eckhoff; Norway	40:29.1 (0+0+3+1)	Marte Olsbu Røiseland; Norway	40:33.9 (1+0+1+1)
4 x 6 km Women Relay	Norway; Synnøve Solemdal; Ingrid Landmark Tandrevold; Marte Olsbu Røiseland; Tiril Eckhoff	1:14:11.6 (0+0) (0+3) (0+0) (0+3) (0+0) (0+2) (0+2) (0+1)	Sweden; Elvira Öberg; Linn Persson; Mona Brorsson; Hanna Öberg	1:14:32.7 (0+1) (0+2) (0+0) (0+1) (0+1) (0+0) (0+2) (0+3)	France; Julia Simon; Anaïs Bescond; Célia Aymonier; Justine Braisaz	1:14:44.7 (0+1) (0+2) (0+3) (0+0) (0+2) (0+0) (0+1) (0+3)
