= 2019–20 Biathlon World Cup – Stage 3 =

The 2019–20 Biathlon World Cup – Stage 3 was the third event of the season and is held in Annecy-Le Grand-Bornand, France, from 19 to 22 December 2019.

== Schedule of events ==
The events took place at the following times.

Date	Time	Events
19 December	14:15 CET	Men's 10 km Sprint
20 December	14:15 CET	Women's 7.5 km Sprint
21 December	13:00 CET	Men's 12.5 km Pursuit
21 December	15:00 CET	Women's 10 km Pursuit
22 December	12:10 CET	Men's 15 km Mass Start
22 December	14:15 CET	Women's 12.5 km Mass Start

== Medal winners ==
=== Men ===
Event:	Gold:	Time	Silver:	Time	Bronze:	Time
10 km Sprint	Benedikt Doll; Germany	23:22.1 (0+0)	Tarjei Bø; Norway	23:31.5 (0+0)	Quentin Fillon Maillet; France	23:33.4 (0+0)
12.5 km Pursuit	Johannes Thingnes Bø; Norway	30:07.8 (1+0+0+0)	Quentin Fillon Maillet; France	30:29.8 (0+0+0+0)	Vetle Sjåstad Christiansen; Norway	31:07.8 (0+0+1+0)
15 km Mass Start	Johannes Thingnes Bø; Norway	41:36.3 (0+0+1+0)	Émilien Jacquelin; France	42:18.4 (0+0+1+0)	Tarjei Bø; Norway	42:28.1 (0+0+0+1)

=== Women ===
Event:	Gold:	Time	Silver:	Time	Bronze:	Time
7.5 km Sprint	Tiril Eckhoff; Norway	20:27.0 (1+0)	Justine Braisaz; France	20:33.2 (0+0)	Markéta Davidová; Czech Republic	20:47.5 (0+0)
10 km Pursuit	Tiril Eckhoff; Norway	29:41.6 (1+0+1+0)	Ingrid Landmark Tandrevold; Norway	30:19.7 (1+0+1+0)	Lena Häcki; Switzerland	30:27.6 (0+1+1+0)
12.5 km Mass Start	Tiril Eckhoff; Norway	38:52.8 (0+1+0+1)	Dorothea Wierer; Italy	40:17.7 (1+0+1+0)	Linn Persson; Sweden	40:17.9 (1+0+0+0)
