= 2019–20 Biathlon World Cup – Stage 1 =

The 2019–20 Biathlon World Cup – Stage 1 was the opening event of the season and was held in Östersund, Sweden, from 30 November to 8 December 2019.

== Schedule of events ==
The events took place at the following times.

Date	Time	Events
30 November	13:10 CET	6 km + 7.5 km Single Mixed Relay
30 November	15:00 CET	4 x 6 km Mixed Relay
1 December	12:30 CET	Men's 10 km Sprint
1 December	15:30 CET	Women's 7.5 km Sprint
4 December	16:15 CET	Men's 20 km Individual
5 December	16:20 CET	Women's 15 km Individual
7 December	17:30 CET	4 x 7.5 km Men's Relay
8 December	15:30 CET	4 x 6 km Women's Relay

== Podium results ==
=== Men ===
Event:	Gold:	Time	Silver:	Time	Bronze:	Time
20 km Individual	Martin Fourcade; France	53:11.9 (0+0+0+1)	Simon Desthieux; France	53:24.6 (0+1+0+0)	Quentin Fillon Maillet; France	55:02.7 (2+0+0+1)
10 km Sprint	Johannes Thingnes Bø; Norway	24:18.3 (1+0)	Tarjei Bø; Norway	24:37.3 (0+1)	Matvey Eliseev; Russia	24:38.2 (0+0)
4 x 7,5 km Men Relay	Norway; Johannes Dale; Erlend Bjøntegaard; Tarjei Bø; Johannes Thingnes Bø	1:10:30.4 (0+0) (0+2) (0+2) (0+1) (0+1) (0+1) (0+1) (0+1)	France; Emilien Jacquelin; Quentin Fillon Maillet; Simon Desthieux; Martin Fourcade	1:11:02.7 (0+0) (0+1) (1+3) (0+0) (0+1) (0+2) (0+0) (0+0)	Italy; Lukas Hofer; Thomas Bormolini; Daniele Cappellari; Dominik Windisch	1:11:57.5 (0+1) (0+1) (0+1) (0+2) (0+1) (0+0) (0+1) (0+1)

=== Women ===
Event:	Gold:	Time	Silver:	Time	Bronze:	Time
15 km Individual	Justine Braisaz; France	42:35.1 (2+0+0+0)	Yuliia Dzhima; Ukraine	42:46.2 (0+0+0+0)	Julia Simon; France	42:52.8 (0+0+0+2)
7.5 km Sprint	Dorothea Wierer; Italy	19:48.5 (0+1)	Marte Olsbu Røiseland; Norway	19:57.1 (2+0)	Markéta Davidová; Czech Republic	20:00.4 (0+0)
4 x 6 km Women Relay	Norway; Karoline Offigstad Knotten; Ingrid Landmark Tandrevold; Tiril Eckhoff; Marte Olsbu Røiseland	1:11:08.7 (0+1) (0+0) (0+3) (0+2) (0+0) (0+2) (0+0) (0+2)	Switzerland; Elisa Gasparin; Selina Gasparin; Aita Gasparin; Lena Häcki	1:11:17.2 (0+2) (0+0) (0+1) (0+0) (0+0) (0+0) (0+0) (0+1)	Sweden; Linn Persson; Elvira Öberg; Mona Brorsson; Hanna Öberg	1:11:18.9 (0+0) (0+3) (0+1) (0+1) (0+0) (0+0) (0+3) (0+0)

=== Mixed ===
Event:	Gold:	Time	Silver:	Time	Bronze:	Time
6 km + 7.5 km Single Mixed Relay	Sweden; Hanna Öberg; Sebastian Samuelsson	36:42.1 (1+3) (1+3) (0+0) (0+1) (0+2) (0+0) (0+1) (0+1)	Germany; Franziska Preuß; Erik Lesser	37:00.2 (0+2) (0+0) (0+2) (0+1) (0+1) (0+0) (0+0) (1+3)	Norway; Marte Olsbu Røiseland; Vetle Sjåstad Christiansen	37:22.5 (0+3) (0+2) (0+2) (1+3) (0+3) (0+0) (0+0) (0+3)
4 x 6 km Mixed Relay	Italy; Lisa Vittozzi; Dorothea Wierer; Lukas Hofer; Dominik Windisch	1:05:56.1 (0+2) (0+0) (0+1) (0+0) (0+1) (0+1) (0+2) (0+2)	Norway; Ingrid Landmark Tandrevold; Tiril Eckhoff; Tarjei Bø; Johannes Thingnes Bø	1:06:00.2 (0+2) (0+3) (0+2) (0+3) (0+1) (0+1) (0+3) (0+0)	Sweden; Linn Persson; Mona Brorsson; Jesper Nelin; Martin Ponsiluoma	1:06:56.0 (0+0) (0+3) (0+0) (0+1) (0+0) (0+3) (0+3) (0+1)
