= 2019–20 Biathlon World Cup – Stage 5 =

The 2019–20 Biathlon World Cup – Stage 5 was the fifth event of the season and is held in Ruhpolding, Germany, from 15 to 19 January 2020.

== Schedule of events ==
The events took place at the following times.

Date	Time	Events
15 January	14:30 CET	Women's 7.5 km Sprint
16 January	14:30 CET	Men's 10 km Sprint
17 January	14:30 CET	4 x 6 km Women's Relay
18 January	14:15 CET	4 x 7.5 km Men's Relay
19 January	12:15 CET	Women's 10 km Pursuit
19 January	14:30 CET	Men's 12.5 km Pursuit

== Medal winners ==
=== Men ===
Event:	Gold:	Time	Silver:	Time	Bronze:	Time
10 km Sprint	Martin Fourcade; France	22:41.5 (0+0)	Quentin Fillon Maillet; France	22:44.6 (0+0)	Benedikt Doll; Germany	22:53.5 (0+0)
12.5 km Pursuit	Martin Fourcade; France	31:26.8 (0+0+0+0)	Quentin Fillon Maillet; France	31:44.4 (0+0+1+0)	Vetle Sjåstad Christiansen; Norway	32:02.8 (0+0+0+1)
4 x 7.5 km Men Relay	France; Émilien Jacquelin; Martin Fourcade; Simon Desthieux; Quentin Fillon Maillet	1:18:11.2 (0+0) (0+1) (0+0) (0+0) (0+1) (0+0) (0+2) (0+2)	Norway; Johannes Dale; Erlend Bjøntegaard; Tarjei Bø; Vetle Sjåstad Christiansen	1:19:23.4 (0+1) (0+3) (0+2) (0+2) (0+0) (0+1) (0+0) (0+1)	Austria; Dominik Landertinger; Simon Eder; Felix Leitner; Julian Eberhard	1:19:35.5 (0+0) (0+1) (0+0) (0+1) (0+0) (0+1) (0+1) (0+0)

=== Women ===
Event:	Gold:	Time	Silver:	Time	Bronze:	Time
7.5 km Sprint	Tiril Eckhoff; Norway	18:55.5 (0+0)	Hanna Öberg; Sweden	19:25.2 (0+0)	Dorothea Wierer; Italy	19:32.3 (0+0)
10 km Pursuit	Tiril Eckhoff; Norway	34:08.7 (0+0+1+0)	Paulína Fialková; Slovakia	34:55.0 (1+0+0+1)	Hanna Öberg; Sweden	35:03.8 (0+1+0+1)
4 x 6 km Women Relay	Norway; Karoline Offigstad Knotten; Ingrid Landmark Tandrevold; Marte Olsbu Røiseland; Tiril Eckhoff	1:08:46.4 (0+2) (0+1) (0+0) (0+2) (0+0) (0+2) (0+1) (0+1)	France; Julia Simon; Anaïs Bescond; Célia Aymonier; Justine Braisaz	1:08:57.1 (0+0) (0+1) (0+0) (0+2) (0+2) (0+0) (0+2) (0+1)	Switzerland; Elisa Gasparin; Selina Gasparin; Aita Gasparin; Lena Häcki	1:09:07.1 (0+1) (0+0) (0+1) (0+2) (0+0) (0+0) (0+0) (0+0)
