= Biathlon World Championships 2020 – Men's relay =

Men's relay at the Biathlon World Championships 2020
- Venue: South Tyrol Arena
- Location: Antholz-Anterselva, Italy
- Dates: 22 February
- Competitors: 108 from 27 nations
- Teams: 27
- Winning time: 1:12:35.9

Medalists
gold medal	Émilien Jacquelin; Martin Fourcade; Simon Desthieux; Quentin Fillon Maillet	France
silver medal	Vetle Sjåstad Christiansen; Johannes Dale; Tarjei Bø; Johannes Thingnes Bø	Norway
bronze medal	Erik Lesser; Philipp Horn; Arnd Peiffer; Benedikt Doll	Germany

The Men's relay competition at the Biathlon World Championships 2020 was held on 22 February 2020.

== Results ==
The race was started at 14:45.

Rank	Bib	Team	Time	Penalties (P+S)	Deficit
1st place, gold medalist(s)	2	France; Émilien Jacquelin; Martin Fourcade; Simon Desthieux; Quentin Fillon Maillet	1:12:35.9; 18:05.5; 17:52.6; 18:15.2; 18:22.6	0+0 0+4; 0+0 0+1; 0+0 0+0; 0+0 0+1; 0+0 0+2	
2nd place, silver medalist(s)	1	Norway; Vetle Sjåstad Christiansen; Johannes Dale; Tarjei Bø; Johannes Thingnes Bø	1:12:57.4; 18:43.8; 18:18.1; 18:06.6; 17:48.9	0+3 1+9; 0+0 1+3; 0+0 0+3; 0+1 0+2; 0+2 0+1	+21.5
3rd place, bronze medalist(s)	3	Germany; Erik Lesser; Philipp Horn; Arnd Peiffer; Benedikt Doll	1:13:12.1; 18:04.9; 17:52.6; 18:03.2; 19:11.4	0+3 1+5; 0+0 0+0; 0+0 0+1; 0+0 0+1; 0+3 1+3	+36.2
4	4	Russia; Evgeniy Garanichev; Matvey Eliseev; Nikita Porshnev; Alexander Loginov	1:14:20.6; 19:01.0; 18:03.9; 19:01.1; 18:14.6	0+5 0+4; 0+1 0+2; 0+2 0+0; 0+2 0+0; 0+0 0+2	+1:44.7
5	5	Slovenia; Miha Dovžan; Jakov Fak; Klemen Bauer; Rok Tršan	1:14:21.7; 18:54.0; 18:08.7; 18:19.6; 18:59.4	0+5 0+3; 0+2 0+0; 0+2 0+1; 0+1 0+2; 0+0 0+0	+1:45.8
6	7	Austria; Felix Leitner; Simon Eder; Julian Eberhard; Dominik Landertinger	1:15:04.4; 18:42.8; 18:19.6; 19:12.3; 18:49.7	0+4 2+8; 0+1 0+3; 0+1 0+1; 0+2 2+3; 0+0 0+1	+2:28.5
7	11	Italy; Lukas Hofer; Thomas Bormolini; Daniele Cappellari; Dominik Windisch	1:15:07.9; 18:23.7; 18:42.7; 19:32.6; 18:28.9	0+4 0+5; 0+1 0+3; 0+0 0+1; 0+2 0+0; 0+1 0+1	+2:32.0
8	14	United States; Leif Nordgren; Sean Doherty; Paul Schommer; Jake Brown	1:15:08.8; 18:44.8; 18:30.6; 19:14.6; 18:38.8	0+1 0+4; 0+0 0+0; 0+0 0+2; 0+1 0+0; 0+0 0+2	+2:32.9
9	6	Belarus; Anton Smolski; Mikita Labastau; Raman Yaliotnau; Sergey Bocharnikov	1:15:16.3; 18:52.1; 18:33.9; 18:48.3; 19:02.0	0+4 0+2; 0+2 0+0; 0+2 0+0; 0+0 0+1; 0+0 0+1	+2:40.4
10	8	Sweden; Peppe Femling; Jesper Nelin; Martin Ponsiluoma; Sebastian Samuelsson	1:16:04.8; 19:57.2; 18:39.6; 18:24.5; 19:03.5	2+6 0+4; 2+3 0+1; 0+1 0+2; 0+1 0+0; 0+1 0+1	+3:28.9
11	18	Bulgaria; Dimitar Gerdzhikov; Krasimir Anev; Anton Sinapov; Vladimir Iliev	1:16:23.1; 18:45.7; 18:18.9; 19:28.7; 19:49.8	0+1 3+7; 0+0 0+0; 0+0 0+1; 0+0 1+3; 0+1 2+3	+3:47.2
12	9	Ukraine; Artem Pryma; Serhiy Semenov; Ruslan Tkalenko; Dmytro Pidruchnyi	1:16:28.4; 18:24.1; 19:20.0; 19:52.7; 18:51.6	0+6 2+8; 0+1 0+0; 0+2 1+3; 0+1 1+3; 0+2 0+2	+3:52.5
13	10	Czech Republic; Michal Šlesingr; Ondřej Moravec; Jakub Štvrtecký; Michal Krčmář	1:16:30.7; 18:46.3; 18:51.1; 19:46.3; 19:07.0	0+4 0+10; 0+0 0+1; 0+1 0+3; 0+2 0+3; 0+1 0+3	+3:54.8
14	12	Canada; Jules Burnotte; Scott Gow; Adam Runnalls; Christian Gow	1:16:38.8; 18:59.5; 18:26.8; 20:29.5; 18:43.0	0+5 2+4; 0+2 0+0; 0+1 0+0; 0+1 2+3; 0+1 0+1	+4:02.9
15	13	Switzerland; Mario Dolder; Serafin Wiestner; Jeremy Finello; Joscha Burkhalter	1:17:11.4; 19:47.7; 19:17.7; 18:50.0; 19:16.0	1+6 1+4; 1+3 0+1; 0+1 1+3; 0+1 0+0; 0+1 0+0	+4:35.5
16	16	Poland; Andrzej Nędza-Kubiniec; Grzegorz Guzik; Łukasz Szczurek; Marcin Szwajnos	1:17:32.6; 19:00.2; 19:25.3; 19:44.0; 19:23.1	0+6 0+5; 0+1 0+2; 0+2 0+2; 0+1 0+1; 0+2 0+0	+4:56.7
17	21	Slovakia; Martin Otčenáš; Šimon Bartko; Michal Šíma; Tomáš Hasilla	1:17:43.9; 19:11.3; 19:39.1; 19:18.1; 19:35.4	0+2 2+8; 0+0 0+1; 0+0 2+3; 0+1 0+1; 0+1 0+3	+5:08.0
18	20	China; Cheng Fangming; Yan Xingyuan; Tang Jinle; Li Xuezhi	LAP; 19:29.1; 19:11.2; 19:55.3	0+2 1+8; 0+0 1+3; 0+0 0+2; 0+1 0+1; 0+1 0+2	
19	26	Belgium; Florent Claude; Thierry Langer; Tom Lahaye-Goffart; Pjotr Dielen	LAP; 19:49.4; 18:57.0; 20:01.2	1+6 0+7; 1+3 0+1; 0+0 0+2; 0+1 0+1; 0+2 0+3	
20	27	Japan; Mikito Tachizaki; Kosuke Ozaki; Shohei Kodama; Kazuki Baisho	LAP; 19:41.8; 19:23.0	0+2 0+4; 0+1 0+1; 0+0 0+1; 0+1 0+2	
21	17	Estonia; Rene Zahkna; Kalev Ermits; Kristo Siimer; Raido Ränkel	LAP; 19:31.8; 19:50.1	1+7 1+4; 1+3 0+1; 0+1 1+3; 0+3 0+0	
22	24	Latvia; Edgars Mise; Andrejs Rastorgujevs; Roberts Slotiņš; Aleksandrs Patrijuks	LAP; 20:41.2; 19:02.8	0+4 1+9; 0+3 1+3; 0+0 0+3; 0+1 0+3	
23	22	Romania; George Buta; Cornel Puchianu; George Coltea; Denis Șerban	LAP; 19:19.1; 19:49.6	1+5 0+4; 0+0 0+0; 0+2 0+3; 1+3 0+1	
24	19	Lithuania; Karol Dombrovski; Vytautas Strolia; Linas Banys; Tomas Kaukėnas	LAP; 20:09.7; 19:18.8	0+6 0+5; 0+0 0+2; 0+3 0+1; 0+3 0+2	
25	23	Kazakhstan; Vladislav Kireyev; Alexandr Mukhin; Danil Beletskiy; Sergey Sirik	LAP; 19:50.2; 19:37.7	0+5 2+4; 0+2 0+0; 0+2 0+1; 0+1 2+3	
26	15	Finland; Jaakko Ranta; Olli Hiidensalo; Tero Seppälä; Tuukka Invenius	LAP; 20:58.8; 19:06.8	4+8 0+5; 2+3 0+2; 0+2 0+1; 2+3 0+2	
27	25	South Korea; Timofey Lapshin; Choi Du-jin; Lee Su-young; Kim Sang-rea	LAP; 19:23.1; 21:36.3	1+5 0+2; 0+2 0+2; 1+3 0+0; 0+0	
