= Biathlon World Championships 2019 – Men's sprint =

Men's sprint at the Biathlon World Championships 2019
- Venue: Östersund Ski Stadium
- Location: Östersund, Sweden
- Dates: 9 March
- Competitors: 104 from 33 nations
- Winning time: 24:37.6

Medalists
gold medal	Johannes Thingnes Bø	Norway
silver medal	Alexander Loginov	Russia
bronze medal	Quentin Fillon Maillet	France

The men's sprint competition at the Biathlon World Championships 2019 was held on 9 March 2019 at 16:30 local time.

== Results ==
Rank	Bib	Name	Nationality	Time	Penalties (P+S)	Deficit
1st place, gold medalist(s)	28	Johannes Thingnes Bø	Norway	24:37.6	1 (0+1)	—
2nd place, silver medalist(s)	36	Alexander Loginov	Russia	24:51.3	0 (0+0)	+13.7
3rd place, bronze medalist(s)	17	Quentin Fillon Maillet	France	24:54.1	0 (0+0)	+16.5
4	25	Dmytro Pidruchnyi	Ukraine	24:54.4	0 (0+0)	+16.8
5	32	Simon Desthieux	France	25:02.4	0 (0+0)	+24.8
6	57	Martin Fourcade	France	25:10.1	0 (0+0)	+32.5
7	67	Erlend Bjøntegaard	Norway	25:12.4	0 (0+0)	+34.8
8	30	Erik Lesser	Germany	25:22.3	0 (0+0)	+44.7
9	39	Arnd Peiffer	Germany	25:24.9	1 (0+1)	+47.3
10	48	Benjamin Weger	Switzerland	25:27.4	0 (0+0)	+49.8
11	65	Benedikt Doll	Germany	25:33.8	2 (0+2)	+56.2
12	3	Philipp Nawrath	Germany	25:42.2	1 (0+1)	+1:04.6
13	9	Tarjei Bø	Norway	25:43.1	2 (0+2)	+1:05.5
14	7	Andrejs Rastorgujevs	Latvia	25:49.5	1 (0+1)	+1:11.9
15	15	Simon Eder	Austria	25:52.4	0 (0+0)	+1:14.8
16	19	Julian Eberhard	Austria	25:59.1	2 (1+1)	+1:21.5
17	27	Jakov Fak	Slovenia	25:59.3	1 (0+1)	+1:21.7
17	38	Klemen Bauer	Slovenia	25:59.3	0 (0+0)	+1:21.7
19	4	Evgeniy Garanichev	Russia	26:00.6	1 (1+0)	+1:23.0
20	37	Antonin Guigonnat	France	26:01.8	1 (0+1)	+1:24.2
21	1	Dominik Landertinger	Austria	26:02.7	1 (0+1)	+1:25.1
22	10	Sean Doherty	United States	26:09.7	0 (0+0)	+1:32.1
23	69	Johannes Kühn	Germany	26:10.3	3 (1+2)	+1:32.7
24	5	Émilien Jacquelin	France	26:11.1	1 (1+0)	+1:33.5
25	29	Olli Hiidensalo	Finland	26:12.2	0 (0+0)	+1:34.6
26	53	Vytautas Strolia	Lithuania	26:15.1	0 (0+0)	+1:37.5
27	18	Dominik Windisch	Italy	26:17.4	3 (1+2)	+1:39.8
28	62	Krasimir Anev	Bulgaria	26:19.9	1 (1+0)	+1:42.3
29	33	Sebastian Samuelsson	Sweden	26:21.6	3 (0+3)	+1:44.0
30	74	Tomáš Krupčík	Czech Republic	26:26.3	1 (1+0)	+1:48.7
31	13	Vetle Sjåstad Christiansen	Norway	26:26.7	2 (1+1)	+1:49.1
32	46	Jeremy Finello	Switzerland	26:27.6	1 (1+0)	+1:50.0
33	77	Dmitry Malyshko	Russia	26:28.5	2 (2+0)	+1:50.9
34	41	Leif Nordgren	United States	26:29.1	0 (0+0)	+1:51.5
35	90	Tero Seppälä	Finland	26:33.4	2 (2+0)	+1:55.8
36	63	Felix Leitner	Austria	26:34.1	1 (0+1)	+1:56.5
37	101	Tuomas Grönman	Finland	26:35.3	0 (0+0)	+1:57.7
38	22	Vladimir Iliev	Bulgaria	26:37.2	3 (1+2)	+1:59.6
39	80	Tomáš Hasilla	Slovakia	26:37.4	0 (0+0)	+1:59.8
40	8	Vladimir Chepelin	Belarus	26:39.0	2 (0+2)	+2:01.4
41	86	Jesper Nelin	Sweden	26:39.6	2 (1+1)	+2:02.0
42	66	Ruslan Tkalenko	Ukraine	26:40.0	1 (0+1)	+2:02.4
43	35	Thomas Bormolini	Italy	26:45.6	1 (1+0)	+2:08.0
44	24	Michal Krčmář	Czech Republic	26:46.2	2 (1+1)	+2:08.6
45	92	Martin Jäger	Switzerland	26:47.3	2 (0+2)	+2:09.7
46	21	Serafin Wiestner	Switzerland	26:48.7	2 (0+2)	+2:11.1
47	11	Roman Yeremin	Kazakhstan	26:50.7	1 (1+0)	+2:13.1
48	91	Tsukasa Kobonoki	Japan	26:53.7	1 (1+0)	+2:16.1
49	14	Matej Kazár	Slovakia	26:55.1	1 (0+1)	+2:17.5
50	2	Scott Gow	Canada	26:55.8	1 (1+0)	+2:18.2
51	60	Matvey Eliseev	Russia	26:57.8	1 (1+0)	+2:20.2
52	23	Lukas Hofer	Italy	26:59.0	5 (3+2)	+2:21.4
53	68	George Buta	Romania	27:06.8	0 (0+0)	+2:29.2
54	45	Martin Otčenáš	Slovakia	27:10.3	1 (1+0)	+2:32.7
55	93	Tomas Kaukėnas	Lithuania	27:12.8	0 (0+0)	+2:35.2
56	104	Dimitar Gerdzhikov	Bulgaria	27:15.1	2 (1+1)	+2:37.5
57	6	Grzegorz Guzik	Poland	27:16.7	2 (0+2)	+2:39.1
58	88	Jake Brown	United States	27:18.6	3 (0+3)	+2:41.0
59	61	Kosuke Ozaki	Japan	27:18.7	2 (1+1)	+2:41.1
60	16	Mikito Tachizaki	Japan	27:19.9	0 (0+0)	+2:42.3
61	70	Aidan Millar	Canada	27:21.1	1 (1+0)	+2:43.5
62	78	Miha Dovžan	Slovenia	27:22.3	2 (1+1)	+2:44.7
63	20	Karol Dombrovski	Lithuania	27:22.9	2 (1+1)	+2:45.3
64	47	Mihail Usov	Moldova	27:24.9	1 (1+0)	+2:47.3
65	94	Jakub Štvrtecký	Czech Republic	27:25.7	3 (2+1)	+2:48.1
66	102	Fredrik Lindström	Sweden	27:27.2	3 (1+2)	+2:49.6
67	34	Kalev Ermits	Estonia	27:27.4	3 (2+1)	+2:49.8
68	26	Rene Zahkna	Estonia	27:30.4	2 (1+1)	+2:52.8
69	55	Raman Yaliotnau	Belarus	27:39.7	3 (2+1)	+3:02.1
70	59	Łukasz Szczurek	Poland	27:41.6	2 (0+2)	+3:04.0
71	42	Florent Claude	Belgium	27:43.6	3 (1+2)	+3:06.0
72	83	Anton Sinapov	Bulgaria	27:45.4	3 (1+2)	+3:07.8
73	103	Sergey Bocharnikov	Belarus	27:47.9	3 (2+1)	+3:10.3
74	98	Raul Antonio Flore	Romania	27:52.1	0 (0+0)	+3:14.5
75	89	Giuseppe Montello	Italy	27:53.5	3 (1+2)	+3:15.9
76	97	Jules Burnotte	Canada	27:55.7	2 (2+0)	+3:18.1
77	73	Anton Smolski	Belarus	27:55.8	3 (1+2)	+3:18.2
78	40	Timur Kuts	Kazakhstan	27:56.8	0 (0+0)	+3:19.2
79	50	Timofey Lapshin	South Korea	27:57.3	4 (2+2)	+3:19.7
80	72	Roland Lessing	Estonia	27:57.9	2 (0+2)	+3:20.3
81	85	Artem Tyshchenko	Ukraine	27:58.9	2 (0+2)	+3:21.3
82	87	Andrzej Nędza-Kubiniec	Poland	28:04.4	2 (1+1)	+3:26.8
83	31	Damir Rastić	Serbia	28:06.7	3 (2+1)	+3:29.1
84	58	Christian Gow	Canada	28:10.1	4 (2+2)	+3:32.5
85	99	Mitja Drinovec	Slovenia	28:15.4	4 (1+3)	+3:37.8
86	12	Peppe Femling	Sweden	28:18.1	5 (2+3)	+3:40.5
87	75	Roberts Slotiņš	Latvia	28:19.1	2 (1+1)	+3:41.5
88	51	Cornel Puchianu	Romania	28:39.5	4 (2+2)	+4:01.9
89	82	Thierry Langer	Belgium	28:39.8	3 (2+1)	+4:02.2
90	49	Apostolos Angelis	Greece	28:42.6	3 (1+2)	+4:05.0
91	64	Aleksandrs Patrijuks	Latvia	28:46.3	4 (3+1)	+4:08.7
92	44	Ondřej Moravec	Czech Republic	28:47.0	3 (1+2)	+4:09.4
93	95	Max Durtschi	United States	28:48.4	4 (1+3)	+4:10.8
94	96	Vitaliy Trush	Ukraine	28:53.1	3 (1+2)	+4:15.5
95	71	Wang Wenqiang	China	28:54.3	4 (2+2)	+4:16.7
96	76	Choi Du-jin	South Korea	29:13.0	2 (2+0)	+4:35.4
97	52	Stavre Jada	North Macedonia	30:18.5	4 (2+2)	+5:40.9
98	79	Petr Yermolenko	Kazakhstan	30:27.7	4 (2+2)	+5:50.1
99	56	Yan Xingyuan	China	30:27.9	6 (3+3)	+5:50.3
100	100	Lee Su-young	South Korea	30:42.4	2 (0+2)	+6:04.8
101	43	Roberto Piqueras	Spain	31:29.8	4 (2+2)	+6:52.2
102	54	Dávid Panyik	Hungary	32:01.2	4 (1+3)	+7:23.6
103	84	Soma Gyallai	Hungary	32:17.2	5 (1+4)	+7:39.6
	81	Milanko Petrović	Serbia	DNF	(4+ )	
