= Biathlon World Championships 2023 – Men's relay =

Men's relay at the Biathlon World Championships 2023
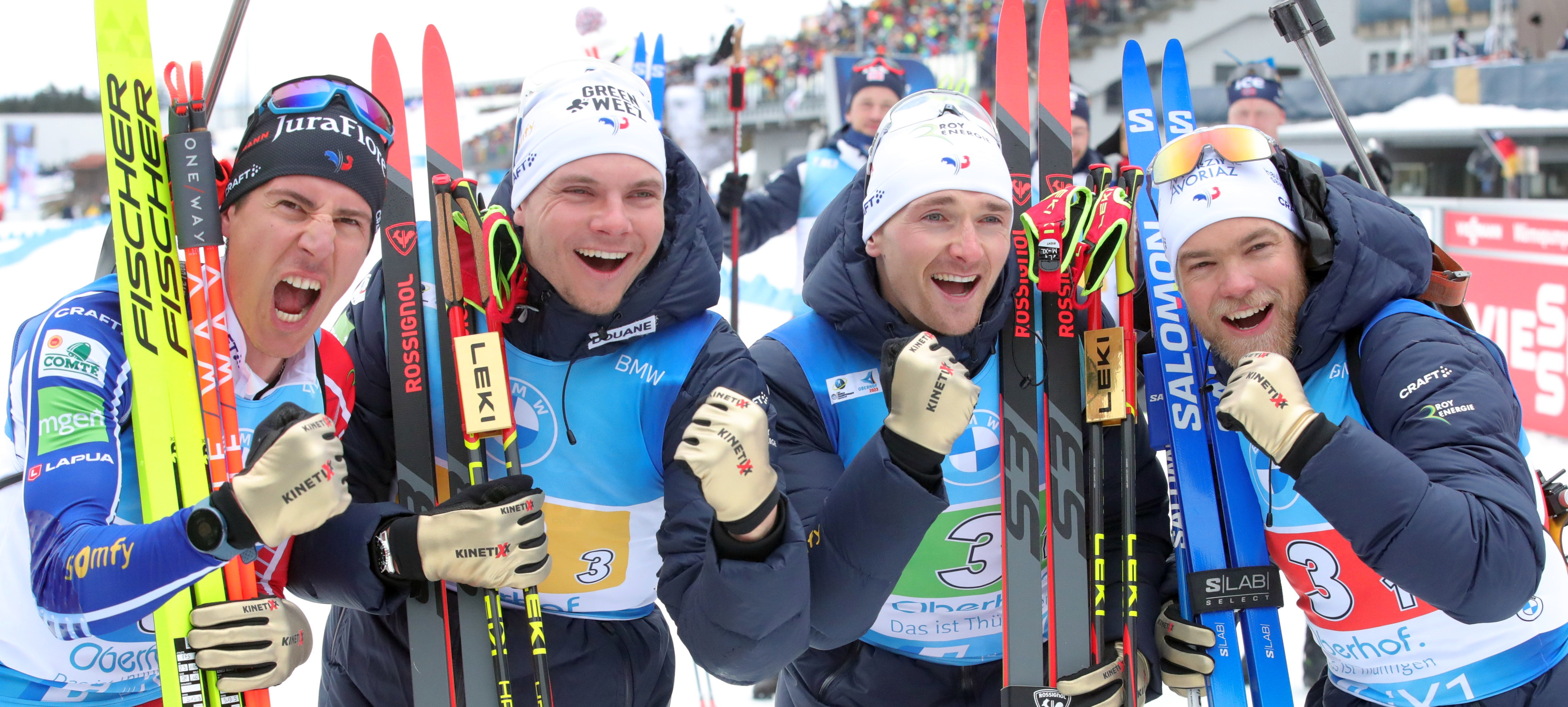
- Location: Oberhof, Germany
- Dates: 18 February
- Competitors: 88 from 22 nations
- Teams: 22
- Winning time: 1:21:48.8

Medalists
gold medal	Antonin Guigonnat; Fabien Claude; Emilien Jacquelin; Quentin Fillon Maillet	France
silver medal	Vetle Sjåstad Christiansen; Tarjei Bø; Vetle Sjåstad Christiansen; Johannes Thingnes Bø	Norway
bronze medal	Peppe Femling; Martin Ponsiluoma; Jesper Nelin; Sebastian Samuelsson	Sweden

The men's 4 × 7.5 km relay competition at the Biathlon World Championships 2023 was held on 18 February 2023.

== Results ==
The race was started at 11:45.

Rank	Bib	Team	Time	Penalties (P+S)	Deficit
1st place, gold medalist(s)	3	France Antonin Guigonnat; Fabien Claude; Emilien Jacquelin; Quentin Fillon Maillet	1:21:48.8; 19:33.3; 20:45.6; 21:16.3; 20:13.6	0+2 1+7; 0+0 0+2; 0+1 0+2; 0+0 1+3; 0+1 0+0	
2nd place, silver medalist(s)	1	Norway Vetle Sjåstad Christiansen; Tarjei Bø; Sturla Holm Lægreid; Johannes Thingnes Bø	1:22:27.6; 20:32.5; 20:54.9; 20:46.4; 20:13.8	0+5 2+9; 0+2 0+3; 0+0 1+3; 0+0 1+3; 0+3 0+0	+38.8
3rd place, bronze medalist(s)	4	Sweden Peppe Femling; Martin Ponsiluoma; Jesper Nelin; Sebastian Samuelsson	1:23:28.7; 20:54.4; 20:19.7; 21:00.2; 21:14.4	0+7 1+6; 0+1 1+3; 0+2 0+1; 0+1 0+1; 0+3 0+1	+1:39.9
4	8	Czech Republic Michal Krčmář; Tomáš Mikyska; Jakub Štvrtecký; Jonáš Mareček	1:23:53.0; 19:36.3; 20:41.2; 21:06.8; 22:28.7	2+3 0+7; 0+0 0+1; 0+0 0+3; 0+0 0+2; 2+3 0+1	+2:04.2
5	2	Germany Justus Strelow; Johannes Kühn; Roman Rees; Benedikt Doll	1:25:40.6; 20:00.9; 22:29.4; 20:42.1; 22:28.2	0+1 5+7; 0+0 0+1; 0+0 3+3; 0+0 0+0; 0+1 2+3	+3:51.8
6	11	Switzerland Sebastian Stalder; Jeremy Finello; Niklas Hartweg; Serafin Wiestner	1:25:56.9; 19:37.3; 22:51.7; 21:02.8; 22:25.1	2+4 4+4; 0+0 0+0; 0+1 4+3; 0+0 0+0; 2+3 0+1	+4:08.1
7	7	Italy Didier Bionaz; Tommaso Giacomel; Elia Zeni; Lukas Hofer	1:26:11.7; 20:19.8; 21:07.4; 22:21.0; 22:23.5	0+7 0+7; 0+1 0+2; 0+2 0+1; 0+3 0+2; 0+1 0+2	+4:22.9
8	13	Romania George Buta; Dmitrii Shamaev; George Coltea; Raul Flore	1:26:37.4; 20:52.1; 22:05.3; 21:31.9; 22:08.1	0+6 0+7; 0+2 0+2; 0+1 0+3; 0+0 0+2; 0+3 0+0	+4:48.6
9	10	Slovenia Alex Cisar; Miha Dovžan; Jakov Fak; Anton Vidmar	1:26:37.5; 20:20.3; 22:39.1; 20:49.1; 22:49.0	0+4 3+10; 0+0 0+3; 0+1 2+3; 0+0 0+1; 0+3 1+3	+4:48.7
10	5	Finland Jaakko Ranta; Tuomas Harjula; Tero Seppala; Olli Hiidensalo	1:26:57.6; 20:48.2; 22:23.5; 20:35.0; 23:10.9	0+0 3+7; 0+0 0+1; 0+0 1+3; 0+0 0+0; 0+0 2+3	+5:08.8
11	14	Canada Christian Gow; Adam Runnalls; Logan Pletz; Trevor Kiers	1:27:21.1; 20:02.4; 22:35.8; 22:54.3; 21:48.6	1+5 1+7; 0+1 0+1; 0+0 1+3; 1+3 0+1; 0+1 0+2	+5:32.3
12	12	United States Sean Doherty; Paul Schommer; Maxime Germain; Vincent Bonacci	1:27:27.4; 20:50.5; 21:04.9; 22:43.0; 22:49.0	0+7 2+9; 0+3 0+2; 0+1 0+1; 0+2 2+3; 0+1 0+3	+5:38.6
13	9	Ukraine Artem Pryma; Dmytro Pidruchnyi; Bogdan Tsymbal; Anton Dudchenko	1:27:39.9; 20:19.2; 23:01.5; 22:01.5; 22:17.7	0+3 6+12; 0+0 0+3; 0+0 4+3; 0+3 1+3; 0+0 1+3	+5:51.1
14	6	Austria David Komatz; Dominic Unterweger; Patrick Jakob; Harald Lemmerer	1:27:49.2; 20:10.6; 22:48.2; 23:02.2; 21:48.2	0+2 3+8; 0+2 0+0; 0+0 3+3; 0+0 0+3; 0+0 0+2	+6:00.4
15	17	Estonia Rene Zahkna; Kristo Siimer; Raido Ränkel; Robert Heldna	1:28:50.9; 20:38.4; 22:19.8; 23:13.2; 22:39.5	1+6 3+7; 0+1 0+0; 0+2 1+3; 1+3 2+3; 0+0 0+1	+7:02.1
16	16	Lithuania Tomas Kaukenas; Vytautas Strolia; Karol Dombrovski; Maksim Fomin	1:29:15.4; 20:20.8; 22:18.1; 22:36.7; 23:59.8	0+6 3+7; 0+0 0+2; 0+2 0+1; 0+1 0+1; 0+3 3+3	+7:26.6
17	15	Poland Andrzej Nędza-Kubiniec; Jan Gunka; Marcin Zawol; Tomasz Jakiela	1:30:02.7; 21:33.4; 22:33.2; 22:38.0; 23:18.1	1+6 1+9; 0+1 0+2; 1+3 0+3; 0+0 1+3; 0+2 0+1	+8:13.9
18	20	Latvia Aleksandrs Patrijuks; Edgars Mise; Andrejs Rastorgujevs; Gints Lusis	1:30:36.8; 21:54.3; 23:13.9; 20:14.9; 25:13.7	0+7 4+10; 0+2 2+3; 0+1 2+3; 0+1 0+1; 0+3 0+3	+8:48.0
19	22	Belgium Thierry Langer; Florent Claude; César Beauvais; Marek Mackels	1:31:47.6; 20:50.0; 21:38.0; 23:33.1; 25:46.5	2+9 2+11; 0+2 0+3; 0+1 0+3; 2+3 0+2; 0+3 2+3	+9:58.8
20	19	Kazakhstan Alexandr Mukhin; Vladislav Kireyev; Asset Dyussenov; Sergey Sirik | valign=top| LAP; 20:32.0; 23:26.5; 23:10.4	0+1 0+3; 0+0 2+3; 0+1 3+3; 1+3		
21	21	Japan Mikito Tachizaki; Kiyomasa Ojima; Ryu Yamamoto; Keita Nagaoka | valign=top|LAP; 21:33.8; 22:20.3	0+0 1+3; 0+1 0+1; 0+3 1+3		
22	18	Moldova Maksim Makarov; Pavel Magazeev; Mihail Usov; Andrei Usov | valign=top|LAP; 21:15.9; 24:16.7	0+0 0+3; 2+3 1+3; 0+1 2+3		
