= Biathlon World Championships 2020 – Men's individual =

Men's individual at the Biathlon World Championships 2020
- Venue: South Tyrol Arena
- Location: Antholz-Anterselva, Italy
- Dates: 19 February
- Competitors: 104 from 36 nations
- Winning time: 49:43.1

Medalists
gold medal	Martin Fourcade	France
silver medal	Johannes Thingnes Bø	Norway
bronze medal	Dominik Landertinger	Austria

The Men's individual competition at the Biathlon World Championships 2020 was held on 19 February 2020.

== Results ==
The race was started at 14:15.

Rank	Bib	Name	Nationality	Time	Penalties (P+S+P+S)	Deficit
1st place, gold medalist(s)	30	Martin Fourcade	France	49:43.1	1 (0+0+0+1)	
2nd place, silver medalist(s)	54	Johannes Thingnes Bø	Norway	50:40.1	2 (1+0+0+1)	+57.0
3rd place, bronze medalist(s)	5	Dominik Landertinger	Austria	51:05.2	1 (0+0+0+1)	+1:22.1
4	23	Jakov Fak	Slovenia	51:13.3	1 (0+1+0+0)	+1:30.2
5	44	Benjamin Weger	Switzerland	52:08.6	2 (0+1+1+0)	+2:25.5
6	21	Tarjei Bø	Norway	52:16.7	3 (0+1+0+2)	+2:33.6
7	51	Quentin Fillon Maillet	France	52:17.7	4 (1+1+2+0)	+2:34.6
8	33	Leif Nordgren	United States	52:47.4	0 (0+0+0+0)	+3:04.3
9	31	Johannes Dale	Norway	53:03.2	4 (1+2+0+1)	+3:20.1
10	35	Sebastian Samuelsson	Sweden	53:18.4	2 (0+1+1+0)	+3:35.3
11	43	Nikita Porshnev	Russia	53:36.4	2 (1+0+1+0)	+3:53.3
12	47	Benedikt Doll	Germany	53:37.8	4 (1+0+2+1)	+3:54.7
13	41	Lukas Hofer	Italy	53:38.2	4 (1+0+1+2)	+3:55.1
14	16	Evgeniy Garanichev	Russia	53:43.0	3 (1+2+0+0)	+3:59.9
15	7	Alexander Loginov	Russia	53:50.0	5 (1+0+1+3)	+4:06.9
16	18	Ondřej Moravec	Czech Republic	53:50.1	3 (0+1+0+2)	+4:07.0
17	96	Peppe Femling	Sweden	53:52.8	2 (1+0+0+1)	+4:09.7
18	2	Krasimir Anev	Bulgaria	53:56.2	2 (0+1+1+0)	+4:13.1
19	14	Fabien Claude	France	53:57.2	4 (2+1+0+1)	+4:14.1
20	49	Christian Gow	Canada	53:59.8	4 (1+0+1+2)	+4:16.7
21	74	Philipp Horn	Germany	54:06.1	4 (2+1+1+0)	+4:23.0
22	77	Andrejs Rastorgujevs	Latvia	54:15.5	4 (1+0+0+3)	+4:32.4
23	75	Michal Krčmář	Czech Republic	54:18.3	3 (0+1+1+1)	+4:35.2
24	3	Sean Doherty	United States	54:20.4	3 (0+2+0+1)	+4:37.3
25	32	Florent Claude	Belgium	54:35.3	2 (0+0+1+1)	+4:52.2
26	52	Johannes Kühn	Germany	54:37.4	5 (2+1+0+2)	+4:54.3
27	26	Felix Leitner	Austria	54:42.6	5 (0+2+2+1)	+4:59.5
28	59	Jules Burnotte	Canada	54:42.7	3 (2+0+0+1)	+4:59.6
29	64	Martin Ponsiluoma	Sweden	54:49.5	4 (1+1+1+1)	+5:06.4
30	34	Karol Dombrovski	Lithuania	54:55.0	1 (0+0+0+1)	+5:11.9
31	8	Serhiy Semenov	Ukraine	54:57.4	4 (2+1+1+0)	+5:14.3
32	66	George Buta	Romania	54:59.8	2 (0+0+1+1)	+5:16.7
33	13	Klemen Bauer	Slovenia	55:00.8	4 (0+2+1+1)	+5:17.7
34	55	Anton Smolski	Belarus	55:02.5	3 (2+0+0+1)	+5:19.4
35	24	Rene Zahkna	Estonia	55:13.5	1 (1+0+0+0)	+5:30.4
36	17	Artem Pryma	Ukraine	55:17.2	4 (0+1+2+1)	+5:34.1
37	28	Łukasz Szczurek	Poland	55:18.1	3 (1+0+0+2)	+5:35.0
38	1	Thierry Langer	Belgium	55:41.7	3 (0+2+1+0)	+5:58.6
39	60	Andrzej Nędza-Kubiniec	Poland	55:42.8	2 (0+2+0+0)	+5:59.7
40	89	Simon Eder	Austria	55:46.2	4 (0+3+1+0)	+6:03.1
41	11	Grzegorz Guzik	Poland	55:54.6	4 (0+3+1+0)	+6:11.5
42	9	Jesper Nelin	Sweden	55:55.3	5 (0+2+0+3)	+6:12.2
43	73	Eduard Latypov	Russia	55:58.0	4 (1+2+1+0)	+6:14.9
44	65	Ruslan Tkalenko	Ukraine	56:13.0	4 (2+0+1+1)	+6:29.9
45	36	Mikito Tachizaki	Japan	56:15.9	3 (0+1+1+1)	+6:32.8
46	78	Jake Brown	United States	56:20.2	4 (0+1+1+2)	+6:37.1
47	83	Philipp Nawrath	Germany	56:22.9	5 (1+2+1+1)	+6:39.8
48	67	Thomas Bormolini	Italy	56:23.8	4 (0+2+2+0)	+6:40.7
48	98	Paul Schommer	United States	56:23.8	3 (0+2+0+1)	+6:40.7
50	45	Arnd Peiffer	Germany	56:32.4	6 (0+2+0+4)	+6:49.3
51	4	Serafin Wiestner	Switzerland	56:34.4	6 (1+2+1+2)	+6:51.3
52	80	Rok Tršan	Slovenia	56:38.6	3 (0+0+1+2)	+6:55.5
53	81	Raman Yaliotnau	Belarus	56:47.0	5 (1+2+0+2)	+7:03.9
54	29	Vladimir Iliev	Bulgaria	56:50.4	7 (1+2+2+2)	+7:07.3
55	72	Vytautas Strolia	Lithuania	56:53.2	3 (0+1+0+2)	+7:10.1
56	46	Cheng Fangming	China	56:56.1	5 (1+1+2+1)	+7:13.0
57	68	Tang Jinle	China	56:58.9	3 (1+1+0+1)	+7:15.8
58	27	Timofey Lapshin	South Korea	57:03.2	5 (1+1+1+2)	+7:20.1
59	37	Simon Desthieux	France	57:04.6	6 (3+1+1+1)	+7:21.5
60	92	Thierry Chenal	Italy	57:09.6	4 (0+1+3+0)	+7:26.5
61	86	Aleksandrs Patrijuks	Latvia	57:11.9	3 (1+0+0+2)	+7:28.8
62	62	Vetle Sjåstad Christiansen	Norway	57:18.4	6 (0+2+2+2)	+7:35.3
63	39	Cornel Puchianu	Romania	57:24.1	5 (0+3+0+2)	+7:41.0
64	97	Miha Dovžan	Slovenia	57:32.0	4 (0+3+0+1)	+7:48.9
65	70	Kosuke Ozaki	Japan	57:46.3	4 (1+2+0+1)	+8:03.2
66	85	Olli Hiidensalo	Finland	57:52.1	5 (0+1+3+1)	+8:09.0
67	82	Simon Bartko	Slovakia	57:52.7	6 (0+2+1+3)	+8:09.6
68	90	Anton Dudchenko	Ukraine	57:54.2	4 (1+1+0+2)	+8:11.1
69	79	Anton Sinapov	Bulgaria	57:56.3	6 (0+3+2+1)	+8:13.2
70	6	Jakub Štvrtecký	Czech Republic	58:03.7	6 (1+3+1+1)	+8:20.6
71	19	Martin Otčenáš	Slovakia	58:14.0	5 (2+1+2+0)	+8:30.9
72	57	Joscha Burkhalter	Switzerland	58:36.9	5 (1+0+2+2)	+8:53.8
73	58	Damir Rastić	Serbia	58:38.6	5 (0+2+1+2)	+8:55.5
74	95	Tomas Kaukėnas	Lithuania	58:49.2	4 (2+1+0+1)	+9:06.1
75	10	Dominik Windisch	Italy	58:50.8	8 (2+3+1+2)	+9:07.7
76	87	Krešimir Crnković	Croatia	58:54.3	5 (0+2+1+2)	+9:11.2
77	103	Dimitar Gerdzhikov	Bulgaria	59:07.4	6 (2+3+0+1)	+9:24.3
78	102	Michal Šíma	Slovakia	59:12.4	5 (0+2+2+1)	+9:29.3
79	99	Maksim Varabei	Belarus	59:32.9	6 (0+3+1+2)	+9:49.8
80	15	Scott Gow	Canada	59:33.9	8 (1+2+2+3)	+9:50.8
81	12	Sergey Bocharnikov	Belarus	59:45.1	7 (3+2+1+1)	+10:02.0
82	56	Roberto Piqueras	Spain	1:00:10.3	4 (2+0+0+2)	+10:27.2
83	38	Alexandr Mukhin	Kazakhstan	1:00:12.8	8 (1+2+4+1)	+10:29.7
84	91	Kristo Siimer	Estonia	1:00:15.7	5 (0+1+2+2)	+10:32.6
85	69	Choi Du-jin	South Korea	1:00:16.7	4 (1+2+0+1)	+10:33.6
86	84	Kalev Ermits	Estonia	1:00:42.3	8 (2+3+1+2)	+10:59.2
87	50	Tero Seppälä	Finland	1:00:47.8	9 (3+2+2+2)	+11:04.7
88	22	Apostolos Angelis	Greece	1:00:53.8	8 (2+2+0+4)	+11:10.7
89	88	Michal Šlesingr	Czech Republic	1:01:08.5	7 (0+3+3+1)	+11:25.4
90	94	Denis Şerban	Romania	1:01:22.6	5 (0+2+0+3)	+11:39.5
91	53	Roberts Slotiņš	Latvia	1:01:31.2	6 (1+3+0+2)	+11:48.1
92	105	Shohei Kodama	Japan	1:01:37.0	5 (2+2+1+0)	+11:53.9
93	76	Tom Lahaye-Goffart	Belgium	1:02:29.7	7 (1+0+4+2)	+12:46.6
94	20	Stavre Jada	North Macedonia	1:02:55.3	5 (1+0+3+1)	+13:12.2
95	101	Jaakko Ranta	Finland	1:03:03.9	7 (4+1+2+0)	+13:20.8
96	42	Zana Öztunç	Turkey	1:04:38.6	7 (4+1+1+1)	+14:55.5
97	104	Sergey Sirik	Kazakhstan	1:06:02.7	11 (3+2+3+3)	+16:19.6
98	100	Aidan Millar	Canada	1:06:08.5	10 (1+3+4+2)	+16:25.4
99	71	Danil Beletskiy	Kazakhstan	1:07:15.7	13 (4+3+3+3)	+17:32.6
100	40	Miloš Čolić	Bosnia and Herzegovina	1:07:37.5	10 (2+2+3+3)	+17:54.4
101	63	Dávid Panyik	Hungary	1:07:54.8	8 (3+1+0+4)	+18:11.7
102	48	Vinny Fountain	Great Britain	1:08:41.9	11 (2+3+4+2)	+18:58.8
103	25	Soma Gyallai	Hungary	1:09:07.9	10 (1+3+3+3)	+19:24.8
	61	Julian Eberhard	Austria	DNF	8 (1+4+0+3)	
	93	Mario Dolder	Switzerland	Did not start		
