= Biathlon World Championships 2019 – Men's pursuit =

Men's pursuit at the Biathlon World Championships 2019
- Venue: Östersund Ski Stadium
- Location: Östersund, Sweden
- Dates: 10 March
- Competitors: 58 from 22 nations
- Winning time: 31:54.1

Medalists
gold medal	Dmytro Pidruchnyi	Ukraine
silver medal	Johannes Thingnes Bø	Norway
bronze medal	Quentin Fillon Maillet	France

The men's pursuit competition at the Biathlon World Championships 2019 was held on 10 March 2019.

== Results ==
The race was started at 16:30.

Rank	Bib	Name	Nationality	Start	Penalties (P+P+S+S)	Time	Deficit
1st place, gold medalist(s)	4	Dmytro Pidruchnyi	Ukraine	0:17	2 (2+0+0+0)	31:54.1	
2nd place, silver medalist(s)	1	Johannes Thingnes Bø	Norway	0:00	5 (0+1+1+3)	32:02.4	+8.3
3rd place, bronze medalist(s)	3	Quentin Fillon Maillet	France	0:17	3 (2+0+0+1)	32:11.8	+17.7
4	13	Tarjei Bø	Norway	1:06	1 (0+0+0+1)	32:12.2	+18.1
5	6	Martin Fourcade	France	0:33	2 (0+0+2+0)	32:21.9	+27.8
6	14	Andrejs Rastorgujevs	Latvia	1:12	1 (0+0+1+0)	32:34.9	+40.8
7	20	Antonin Guigonnat	France	1:24	2 (0+0+0+2)	32:41.4	+47.3
8	10	Benjamin Weger	Switzerland	0:50	3 (0+0+2+1)	32:41.9	+47.8
9	19	Evgeniy Garanichev	Russia	1:23	1 (0+0+0+1)	32:42.4	+48.3
10	15	Simon Eder	Austria	1:15	0 (0+0+0+0)	32:43.4	+49.3
11	8	Erik Lesser	Germany	0:45	3 (0+0+2+1)	32:57.4	+1:03.3
12	11	Benedikt Doll	Germany	0:56	4 (1+0+1+2)	33:06.4	+1:12.3
13	9	Arnd Peiffer	Germany	0:47	4 (1+1+1+1)	33:12.8	+1:18.7
14	2	Alexander Loginov	Russia	0:14	5 (1+0+2+2)	33:16.6	+1:22.5
15	7	Erlend Bjøntegaard	Norway	0:35	5 (2+0+3+0)	33:37.6	+1:43.5
16	29	Sebastian Samuelsson	Sweden	1:44	3 (1+0+1+1)	33:43.3	+1:49.2
17	27	Dominik Windisch	Italy	1:40	3 (0+2+0+1)	33:43.6	+1:49.5
18	30	Tomáš Krupčík	Czech Republic	1:49	2 (1+1+0+0)	33:43.9	+1:49.8
19	16	Julian Eberhard	Austria	1:22	4 (1+0+2+1)	33:45.0	+1:50.9
20	22	Sean Doherty	United States	1:32	2 (1+0+1+0)	33:48.4	+1:54.3
21	12	Philipp Nawrath	Germany	1:05	5 (3+2+0+0)	33:52.9	+1:58.8
22	36	Felix Leitner	Austria	1:57	2 (0+0+2+0)	33:53.9	+1:59.8
23	31	Vetle Sjåstad Christiansen	Norway	1:49	4 (0+0+3+1)	33:54.3	+2:00.2
24	23	Johannes Kühn	Germany	1:33	6 (0+1+3+2)	34:04.2	+2:10.1
25	44	Michal Krčmář	Czech Republic	2:09	2 (0+0+2+0)	34:06.3	+2:12.2
26	17	Jakov Fak	Slovenia	1:22	3 (0+0+1+2)	34:13.4	+2:19.3
27	43	Thomas Bormolini	Italy	2:08	2 (1+0+0+1)	34:15.8	+2:21.7
28	35	Tero Seppälä	Finland	1:56	3 (1+1+0+1)	34:16.9	+2:22.8
29	24	Émilien Jacquelin	France	1:34	3 (2+0+1+0)	34:26.8	+2:32.7
30	33	Dmitry Malyshko	Russia	1:51	5 (2+1+0+2)	34:27.1	+2:33.0
31	32	Jeremy Finello	Switzerland	1:50	3 (1+1+1+0)	34:27.3	+2:33.2
32	5	Simon Desthieux	France	0:25	9 (3+4+1+1)	34:36.8	+2:42.7
33	41	Jesper Nelin	Sweden	2:02	5 (1+1+1+2)	34:43.2	+2:49.1
34	21	Dominik Landertinger	Austria	1:25	5 (2+0+1+2)	34:49.6	+2:55.5
35	51	Matvey Eliseev	Russia	2:20	4 (1+0+3+0)	34:50.5	+2:56.4
36	18	Klemen Bauer	Slovenia	1:22	6 (2+0+2+2)	34:50.8	+2:56.7
37	38	Vladimir Iliev	Bulgaria	2:00	5 (1+0+2+2)	34:55.2	+3:01.1
38	42	Ruslan Tkalenko	Ukraine	2:02	2 (0+2+0+0)	34:55.9	+3:01.8
39	28	Krasimir Anev	Bulgaria	1:42	2 (0+0+1+1)	35:18.6	+3:24.5
40	37	Tuomas Grönman	Finland	1:58	3 (1+1+0+1)	35:20.7	+3:26.6
41	40	Vladimir Chepelin	Belarus	2:01	4 (0+0+2+2)	35:20.8	+3:26.7
42	52	Lukas Hofer	Italy	2:21	6 (1+1+3+1)	35:43.3	+3:49.2
43	50	Scott Gow	Canada	2:18	4 (2+0+0+2)	35:45.5	+3:51.4
44	34	Leif Nordgren	United States	1:52	4 (0+0+3+1)	35:56.8	+4:02.7
45	49	Matej Kazár	Slovakia	2:18	4 (1+0+3+0)	36:09.9	+4:15.8
46	45	Martin Jäger	Switzerland	2:10	5 (1+0+2+2)	36:19.9	+4:25.8
47	25	Olli Hiidensalo	Finland	1:35	6 (1+3+0+2)	36:31.0	+4:36.9
48	56	Dimitar Gerdzhikov	Bulgaria	2:38	4 (3+0+1+0)	36:45.1	+4:51.0
49	46	Serafin Wiestner	Switzerland	2:11	5 (2+0+1+2)	36:58.8	+5:04.7
50	57	Grzegorz Guzik	Poland	2:39	6 (3+1+2+0)	37:24.4	+5:30.3
51	54	Martin Otčenáš	Slovakia	2:33	6 (0+2+1+3)	37:26.9	+5:32.8
52	53	George Buta	Romania	2:29	4 (2+0+1+1)	37:30.9	+5:36.8
53	58	Jake Brown	United States	2:41	7 (1+1+4+1)	37:54.9	+6:00.8
54	48	Tsukasa Kobonoki	Japan	2:16	8 (1+3+4+0)	38:03.0	+6:08.9
55	60	Mikito Tachizaki	Japan	2:42	5 (2+0+2+1)	38:23.0	+6:28.9
56	39	Tomáš Hasilla	Slovakia	2:00	9 (1+2+4+2)	38:37.9	+6:43.8
57	59	Kosuke Ozaki	Japan	2:41	9 (1+4+1+3)	39:03.8	+7:09.7
	26	Vytautas Strolia	Lithuania	1:38	Disqualified		
	47	Roman Yeremin	Kazakhstan	2:13	Did not start		
	55	Tomas Kaukėnas	Lithuania	2:35	Did not start		
