= Biathlon World Championships 2020 – Single mixed relay =

Single mixed relay at the Biathlon World Championships 2020
- Venue: South Tyrol Arena
- Location: Antholz-Anterselva, Italy
- Dates: 20 February
- Competitors: 60 from 30 nations
- Teams: 30
- Winning time: 34:19.9

Medalists
gold medal	Marte Olsbu Røiseland; Johannes Thingnes Bø	Norway
silver medal	Franziska Preuß; Erik Lesser	Germany
bronze medal	Anaïs Bescond; Émilien Jacquelin	France

The Single mixed relay competition at the Biathlon World Championships 2020 was held on 20 February 2020.

== Results ==
The race was started at 15:15.

Rank	Bib	Team	Time	Penalties (P+S)	Deficit
1st place, gold medalist(s)	6	Norway; Marte Olsbu Røiseland; Johannes Thingnes Bø; Marte Olsbu Røiseland; Johannes Thingnes Bø	34:19.9; 8:17.7; 7:32.1; 8:15.1; 10:15.0	0+2 0+4; 0+1 0+0; 0+1 0+3; 0+0 0+1; 0+0 0+0	
2nd place, silver medalist(s)	4	Germany; Franziska Preuß; Erik Lesser; Franziska Preuß; Erik Lesser	34:37.5; 8:28.5; 7:16.2; 8:16.7; 10:36.1	0+1 0+4; 0+0 0+1; 0+0 0+2; 0+1 0+0; 0+0 0+1	+17.6
3rd place, bronze medalist(s)	1	France; Anaïs Bescond; Émilien Jacquelin; Anaïs Bescond; Émilien Jacquelin	34:49.7; 8:23.9; 7:38.1; 8:21.0; 10:26.7	0+3 0+1; 0+0 0+0; 0+2 0+1; 0+1 0+0; 0+0 0+0	+29.8
4	3	Sweden; Hanna Öberg; Sebastian Samuelsson; Hanna Öberg; Sebastian Samuelsson	34:55.1; 8:23.3; 7:38.0; 8:07.8; 10:46.0	0+1 0+6; 0+0 0+1; 0+1 0+1; 0+0 0+2; 0+0 0+2	+35.2
5	9	Switzerland; Lena Häcki; Benjamin Weger; Lena Häcki; Benjamin Weger	35:00.5; 8:19.0; 7:24.2; 8:21.6; 10:55.7	0+5 0+4; 0+2 0+0; 0+0 0+1; 0+1 0+1; 0+2 0+2	+40.6
6	7	Austria; Lisa Hauser; Simon Eder; Lisa Hauser; Simon Eder	35:14.4; 8:26.7; 7:28.8; 8:40.3; 10:38.6	0+3 0+1; 0+0 0+1; 0+0 0+0; 0+3 0+0; 0+0 0+0	+54.5
7	11	Russia; Larisa Kuklina; Matvey Eliseev; Larisa Kuklina; Matvey Eliseev	35:20.4; 8:36.3; 7:28.1; 8:34.4; 10:41.6	0+4 0+2; 0+1 0+1; 0+0 0+1; 0+2 0+0; 0+1 0+0	+1:00.5
8	8	Canada; Emma Lunder; Scott Gow; Emma Lunder; Scott Gow	35:23.3; 8:31.9; 7:25.1; 8:20.1; 11:06.2	0+5 0+2; 0+2 0+0; 0+2 0+0; 0+0 0+0; 0+1 0+2	+1:03.4
9	13	Italy; Dorothea Wierer; Lukas Hofer; Dorothea Wierer; Lukas Hofer	35:35.2; 8:47.6; 7:17.4; 8:34.4; 10:55.8	0+4 1+9; 0+3 0+2; 0+0 0+2; 0+0 1+3; 0+1 0+2	+1:15.3
10	5	Ukraine; Anastasiya Merkushyna; Dmytro Pidruchnyi; Anastasiya Merkushyna; Dmytro Pidruchnyi	35:47.1; 8:40.2; 7:17.2; 8:37.0; 11:12.7	0+6 0+2; 0+0 0+1; 0+1 0+0; 0+2 0+0; 0+3 0+1	+1:27.2
11	12	United States; Susan Dunklee; Sean Doherty; Susan Dunklee; Sean Doherty	35:59.4; 8:45.6; 7:51.6; 8:23.3; 10:58.9	1+6 0+3; 1+3 0+0; 0+2 0+2; 0+0 0+1; 0+1 0+0	+1:39.5
12	2	Estonia; Regina Oja; Rene Zahkna; Regina Oja; Rene Zahkna	36:02.6; 8:34.4; 7:28.1; 8:50.2; 11:09.9	0+6 0+3; 0+0 0+0; 0+2 0+1; 0+2 0+0; 0+2 0+2	+1:42.7
13	18	Japan; Fuyuko Tachizaki; Mikito Tachizaki; Fuyuko Tachizaki; Mikito Tachizaki	36:07.9; 8:39.7; 7:27.1; 8:40.7; 11:20.4	0+0 0+5; 0+0 0+1; 0+0 0+0; 0+0 0+1; 0+0 0+3	+1:48.0
14	16	Czech Republic; Markéta Davidová; Michal Krčmář; Markéta Davidová; Michal Krčmář	36:19.5; 9:09.0; 7:53.8; 8:38.2; 10:38.5	0+5 1+7; 0+1 1+3; 0+2 0+3; 0+1 0+1; 0+1 0+0	+1:59.6
15	10	Belarus; Hanna Sola; Mikita Labastau; Hanna Sola; Mikita Labastau	36:31.5; 8:49.4; 7:45.4; 8:42.8; 11:13.9	0+6 0+7; 0+2 0+3; 0+0 0+3; 0+3 0+1; 0+1 0+0	+2:11.6
16	15	South Korea; Anna Frolina; Timofey Lapshin; Anna Frolina; Timofey Lapshin	36:32.5; 9:08.6; 7:15.1; 9:14.5; 10:54.3	1+9 0+5; 0+3 0+2; 0+1 0+0; 1+3 0+2; 0+2 0+1	+2:12.6
17	24	Latvia; Baiba Bendika; Andrejs Rastorgujevs; Baiba Bendika; Andrejs Rastorgujevs	36:44.0; 8:57.3; 7:19.4; 9:19.0; 11:08.3	1+5 0+9; 0+1 0+3; 0+0 0+1; 1+3 0+2; 0+1 0+3	+2:24.1
18	14	Poland; Kamila Żuk; Andrzej Nędza-Kubiniec; Kamila Żuk; Andrzej Nędza-Kubiniec	36:52.2; 8:48.1; 8:06.1; 8:39.7; 11:18.3	0+6 0+5; 0+2 0+0; 0+3 0+3; 0+0 0+1; 0+1 0+1	+2:32.3
19	23	Slovenia; Nika Vindišar; Alex Cisar; Nika Vindišar; Alex Cisar	36:59.0; 8:47.3; 7:33.4; 9:19.4; 11:18.9	0+4 0+2; 0+2 0+0; 0+0 0+0; 0+2 0+2; 0+0 0+0	+2:39.1
20	27	Belgium; Lotte Lie; Florent Claude; Lotte Lie; Florent Claude	37:04.4; 8:55.9; 7:40.1; 8:51.7; 11:36.7	1+4 0+1; 0+0 0+0; 0+1 0+0; 0+0 0+0; 1+3 0+1	+2:44.5
21	22	China; Tang Jialin; Cheng Fangming; Tang Jialin; Cheng Fangming	37:06.8; 8:44.3; 7:43.8; 9:05.2; 11:33.5	0+1 1+8; 0+0 0+1; 0+1 0+2; 0+0 0+2; 0+0 1+3	+2:46.9
22	17	Kazakhstan; Galina Vishnevskaya; Vladislav Kireyev; Galina Vishnevskaya; Vladislav Kireyev	37:31.4; 8:54.6; 7:49.7; 8:39.5; 12:07.6	0+6 0+5; 0+2 0+1; 0+0 0+2; 0+1 0+0; 0+3 0+2	+3:11.5
23	26	Finland; Mari Eder; Tero Seppälä; Mari Eder; Tero Seppälä	LAP; 8:30.2; 8:15.8; 9:08.1	1+7 3+7; 0+1 0+0; 0+1 2+3; 0+2 1+3; 1+3 0+1	
24	21	Lithuania; Natalija Kočergina; Karol Dombrovski; Natalija Kočergina; Karol Dombrovski	LAP; 9:08.7; 7:46.3; 9:04.0	1+7 1+8; 0+1 0+2; 0+2 0+1; 0+1 0+2; 1+3 1+3	
25	20	Bulgaria; Maria Zdravkova; Anton Sinapov; Maria Zdravkova; Anton Sinapov	LAP; 9:30.5; 7:56.4; 9:25.8	0+9 0+2; 0+3 0+0; 0+2 0+1; 0+1 0+1; 0+3	
26	19	Slovakia; Veronika Machyniaková; Tomáš Hasilla; Veronika Machyniaková; Tomáš Hasilla	LAP; 9:54.7; 7:55.2	0+4 0+2; 0+1 0+1; 0+2 0+0; 0+1 0+1	
27	25	Romania; Enikő Márton; George Coltea; Enikő Márton; George Coltea	LAP; 10:04.8; 8:35.6	2+6 0+1; 1+3 0+0; 1+3 0+1; 0+0	
28	28	Croatia; Nika Blaženić; Krešimir Crnković; Nika Blaženić; Krešimir Crnković	LAP; 9:59.6; 8:51.6	0+1 1+5; 0+0 0+2; 0+1 1+3; 0+0	
29	30	Hungary; Sára Pónya; Dávid Panyik; Sára Pónya; Dávid Panyik	LAP; 10:34.8	0+0 1+5; 0+0 1+3; 0+0 0+2	
30	29	Great Britain; Amanda Lightfoot; Vinny Fountain; Amanda Lightfoot; Vinny Fountain	LAP; 10:09.2	2+6 1+5; 1+3 0+2; 1+3 1+3	
