= Biathlon World Championships 2021 – Men's pursuit =

Men's pursuit at the Biathlon World Championships 2021
- Location: Pokljuka, Slovenia
- Date: 14 February
- Competitors: 60 from 24 nations
- Winning time: 31:22.1

Medalists
| gold medal | Émilien Jacquelin | France |
| silver medal | Sebastian Samuelsson | Sweden |
| bronze medal | Johannes Thingnes Bø | Norway |

The Men's pursuit competition at the Biathlon World Championships 2021 was held on 14 February 2021.

== Results ==
The race was started at 13:15.

| Rank | Bib | Name | Nationality | Start | Penalties (P+P+S+S) | Time | Deficit |
|---|---|---|---|---|---|---|---|
| 1st place, gold medalist(s) | 3 | Émilien Jacquelin | France | 0:13 | 0 (0+0+0+0) | 31:22.1 | |
| 2nd place, silver medalist(s) | 8 | Sebastian Samuelsson | Sweden | 0:27 | 0 (0+0+0+0) | 31:29.4 | +7.3 |
| 3rd place, bronze medalist(s) | 5 | Johannes Thingnes Bø | Norway | 0:23 | 2 (0+1+1+0) | 31:30.2 | +8.1 |
| 4 | 6 | Quentin Fillon Maillet | France | 0:24 | 2 (2+0+0+0) | 31:54.6 | +32.5 |
| 5 | 2 | Simon Desthieux | France | 0:11 | 1 (0+0+0+1) | 32:04.0 | +41.9 |
| 6 | 7 | Sturla Holm Lægreid | Norway | 0:26 | 1 (0+0+1+0) | 32:20.0 | +57.9 |
| 7 | 10 | Eduard Latypov | RBU | 0:33 | 2 (0+0+1+1) | 32:57.2 | +1:35.1 |
| 8 | 20 | Artem Pryma | Ukraine | 1:02 | 3 (0+1+2+0) | 33:22.7 | +2:00.6 |
| 9 | 16 | Simon Eder | Austria | 0:56 | 1 (0+0+1+0) | 33:25.9 | +2:03.8 |
| 10 | 15 | Andrejs Rastorgujevs | Latvia | 0:54 | 3 (0+1+1+1) | 33:34.2 | +2:12.1 |
| 11 | 4 | Johannes Dale | Norway | 0:22 | 5 (0+2+3+0) | 33:42.0 | +2:19.9 |
| 12 | 41 | Fabien Claude | France | 1:46 | 2 (0+1+1+0) | 33:42.6 | +2:20.5 |
| 13 | 1 | Martin Ponsiluoma | Sweden | 0:00 | 6 (2+2+1+1) | 33:42.9 | +2:20.8 |
| 14 | 9 | Tarjei Bø | Norway | 0:28 | 5 (1+1+2+1) | 33:47.4 | +2:25.3 |
| 15 | 13 | Lukas Hofer | Italy | 0:48 | 5 (3+0+1+1) | 33:49.4 | +2:27.3 |
| 16 | 26 | Alexander Loginov | RBU | 1:15 | 4 (1+0+1+2) | 33:50.7 | +2:28.6 |
| 17 | 19 | Matvey Eliseev | RBU | 1:02 | 3 (3+0+0+0) | 34:07.2 | +2:45.1 |
| 18 | 30 | Bogdan Tsymbal | Ukraine | 1:20 | 1 (1+0+0+0) | 34:11.4 | +2:49.3 |
| 19 | 27 | Thomas Bormolini | Italy | 1:18 | 2 (0+0+2+0) | 34:11.9 | +2:49.8 |
| 20 | 36 | Arnd Peiffer | Germany | 1:37 | 4 (0+2+1+1) | 34:20.1 | +2:58.0 |
| 21 | 14 | Antonin Guigonnat | France | 0:49 | 6 (3+0+2+1) | 34:20.9 | +2:58.8 |
| 22 | 11 | Michal Krčmář | Czech Republic | 0:38 | 5 (2+0+2+1) | 34:27.0 | +3:04.9 |
| 23 | 25 | Miha Dovžan | Slovenia | 1:15 | 3 (1+0+2+0) | 34:29.5 | +3:07.4 |
| 24 | 38 | David Komatz | Austria | 1:43 | 1 (0+1+0+0) | 34:31.8 | +3:09.7 |
| 25 | 12 | Jake Brown | United States | 0:45 | 5 (2+1+1+1) | 34:39.3 | +3:17.2 |
| 26 | 22 | Florent Claude | Belgium | 1:04 | 3 (0+2+0+1) | 34:41.8 | +3:19.7 |
| 27 | 47 | Tuomas Harjula | Finland | 2:00 | 1 (0+0+0+1) | 34:42.4 | +3:20.3 |
| 28 | 23 | Dmytro Pidruchnyi | Ukraine | 1:05 | 6 (2+0+3+1) | 34:47.3 | +3:25.2 |
| 29 | 18 | Jesper Nelin | Sweden | 1:00 | 6 (2+0+2+2) | 34:51.0 | +3:28.9 |
| 30 | 17 | Christian Gow | Canada | 0:58 | 5 (1+3+0+1) | 34:55.5 | +3:33.4 |
| 31 | 39 | Benedikt Doll | Germany | 1:44 | 6 (1+1+3+1) | 34:56.5 | +3:34.4 |
| 32 | 28 | Tero Seppälä | Finland | 1:19 | 4 (0+1+1+2) | 35:00.4 | +3:38.3 |
| 33 | 46 | Leif Nordgren | United States | 1:59 | 2 (1+0+0+1) | 35:09.6 | +3:47.5 |
| 34 | 33 | Anton Smolski | Belarus | 1:35 | 4 (2+1+0+1) | 35:16.2 | +3:54.1 |
| 35 | 35 | Jakov Fak | Slovenia | 1:37 | 4 (0+2+0+2) | 35:20.1 | +3:58.0 |
| 36 | 34 | Dominik Windisch | Italy | 1:36 | 7 (1+1+4+1) | 35:42.4 | +4:20.3 |
| 37 | 31 | Peppe Femling | Sweden | 1:21 | 5 (0+2+2+1) | 35:46.8 | +4:24.7 |
| 38 | 57 | Vladimir Iliev | Bulgaria | 2:11 | 4 (2+0+1+1) | 35:49.9 | +4:27.8 |
| 39 | 60 | George Buta | Romania | 2:15 | 1 (0+1+0+0) | 35:52.0 | +4:29.9 |
| 40 | 43 | Rene Zahkna | Estonia | 1:48 | 2 (0+1+1+0) | 36:05.2 | +4:43.1 |
| 41 | 45 | Johannes Kühn | Germany | 1:57 | 7 (2+1+3+1) | 36:07.9 | +4:45.8 |
| 42 | 58 | Tsukasa Kobonoki | Japan | 2:14 | 3 (0+1+2+0) | 36:10.2 | +4:48.1 |
| 43 | 44 | Martin Jäger | Switzerland | 1:49 | 7 (1+3+0+3) | 36:13.2 | +4:51.1 |
| 44 | 59 | Thierry Langer | Belgium | 2:15 | 3 (0+1+0+2) | 36:13.5 | +4:51.4 |
| 45 | 52 | Felix Leitner | Austria | 2:03 | 5 (1+0+3+1) | 36:14.1 | +4:52.0 |
| 46 | 55 | Ondřej Moravec | Czech Republic | 2:08 | 4 (1+0+1+2) | 36:16.8 | +4:54.7 |
| 47 | 51 | Rok Tršan | Slovenia | 2:02 | 3 (1+0+2+0) | 36:25.7 | +5:03.6 |
| 48 | 50 | Niklas Hartweg | Switzerland | 2:02 | 5 (2+2+0+1) | 36:26.1 | +5:04.0 |
| 49 | 40 | Karol Dombrovski | Lithuania | 1:45 | 3 (0+0+1+2) | 36:26.2 | +5:04.1 |
| 50 | 42 | Mihail Usov | Moldova | 1:48 | 6 (2+1+1+2) | 36:55.0 | +5:32.9 |
| 51 | 24 | Maksim Varabei | Belarus | 1:11 | 8 (2+1+2+3) | 37:01.0 | +5:38.9 |
| 52 | 29 | Olli Hiidensalo | Finland | 1:20 | 6 (0+1+2+3) | 37:03.2 | +5:41.1 |
| 53 | 37 | Michal Šíma | Slovakia | 1:40 | 5 (2+1+1+1) | 37:03.8 | +5:41.7 |
| 54 | 32 | Sergey Bocharnikov | Belarus | 1:27 | 6 (3+2+0+1) | 37:26.7 | +6:04.6 |
| 55 | 56 | Adam Runnalls | Canada | 2:08 | 8 (1+3+3+1) | 37:53.3 | +6:31.2 |
| 56 | 53 | Anton Babikov | RBU | 2:06 | 6 (2+2+1+1) | 38:01.9 | +6:39.8 |
| 57 | 48 | Trevor Kiers | Canada | 2:00 | 8 (0+4+2+2) | 38:20.8 | +6:58.7 |
| 58 | 21 | Didier Bionaz | Italy | 1:03 | 13 (4+5+2+2) | 39:16.9 | +7:54.8 |
| | 49 | Dimitar Gerdzhikov | Bulgaria | 2:00 | (4+0+2+ ) | Lapped | |
| | 54 | Klemen Bauer | Slovenia | 2:07 | (1+1+3+ ) | Lapped | |
