= Biathlon World Championships 2020 – Men's pursuit =

Men's pursuit at the Biathlon World Championships 2020
- Venue: South Tyrol Arena
- Location: Antholz-Anterselva, Italy
- Dates: 16 February
- Competitors: 60 from 24 nations
- Winning time: 31:15.2

Medalists
gold medal	Émilien Jacquelin	France
silver medal	Johannes Thingnes Bø	Norway
bronze medal	Alexandr Loginov	Russia

The Men's pursuit competition at the Biathlon World Championships 2020 was held on 16 February 2020.

== Results ==
The race was started at 15:15.

Rank	Bib	Name	Nationality	Start	Penalties (P+P+S+S)	Time	Deficit
1st place, gold medalist(s)	6	Émilien Jacquelin	France	0:30	0 (0+0+0+0)	31:15.2	
2nd place, silver medalist(s)	5	Johannes Thingnes Bø	Norway	0:24	2 (1+1+0+0)	31:15.6	+0.4
3rd place, bronze medalist(s)	1	Alexandr Loginov	Russia	0:00	1 (0+0+0+1)	31:39.1	+23.9
4	3	Martin Fourcade	France	0:20	2 (0+0+1+1)	32:01.5	+46.3
5	7	Arnd Peiffer	Germany	0:40	1 (1+0+0+0)	32:09.1	+53.9
6	4	Tarjei Bø	Norway	0:23	2 (1+0+0+1)	32:27.7	+1:12.5
7	2	Quentin Fillon Maillet	France	0:07	6 (4+0+1+1)	32:41.1	+1:25.9
8	18	Simon Desthieux	France	1:19	1 (1+0+0+0)	32:42.1	+1:26.9
9	9	Felix Leitner	Austria	0:52	2 (0+0+1+1)	32:48.2	+1:33.0
10	33	Vetle Sjåstad Christiansen	Norway	1:44	1 (0+0+1+0)	33:13.6	+1:58.4
11	19	Jesper Nelin	Sweden	1:20	2 (0+0+0+2)	33:16.2	+2:01.0
12	37	Simon Eder	Austria	1:55	0 (0+0+0+0)	33:17.4	+2:02.2
13	30	Krasimir Anev	Bulgaria	1:38	1 (0+0+1+0)	33:19.1	+2:03.9
14	26	Julian Eberhard	Austria	1:28	4 (1+1+1+1)	33:22.4	+2:07.2
15	35	Erlend Bjøntegaard	Norway	1:50	2 (0+0+1+1)	33:24.3	+2:09.1
16	20	Peppe Femling	Sweden	1:21	2 (1+0+0+1)	33:31.0	+2:15.8
17	23	Johannes Dale	Norway	1:24	4 (0+0+2+2)	33:33.3	+2:18.1
18	8	Philipp Horn	Germany	0:44	6 (1+2+2+1)	33:34.2	+2:19.0
19	11	Sebastian Samuelsson	Sweden	1:04	3 (0+0+2+1)	33:41.6	+2:26.4
20	21	Lukas Hofer	Italy	1:22	4 (1+0+0+3)	33:49.4	+2:34.2
21	45	Jakov Fak	Slovenia	2:04	2 (0+0+1+1)	33:51.7	+2:36.5
22	46	Ondřej Moravec	Czech Republic	2:05	1 (1+0+0+0)	33:55.3	+2:40.1
23	27	Martin Ponsiluoma	Sweden	1:28	4 (2+0+0+2)	34:05.6	+2:50.4
24	25	Artem Pryma	Ukraine	1:26	3 (0+1+1+1)	34:13.9	+2:58.7
25	29	Rok Tršan	Slovenia	1:37	1 (0+0+0+1)	34:19.8	+3:04.6
26	13	Martin Otčenáš	Slovakia	1:11	3 (1+2+0+0)	34:20.9	+3:05.7
27	39	Michal Krčmář	Czech Republic	1:58	4 (0+2+0+2)	34:29.4	+3:14.2
28	40	Johannes Kühn	Germany	1:59	5 (2+0+2+1)	34:29.5	+3:14.3
29	14	Benedikt Doll	Germany	1:12	7 (1+1+2+3)	34:31.1	+3:15.9
30	10	Dmytro Pidruchnyi	Ukraine	0:56	5 (2+0+2+1)	34:37.8	+3:22.6
31	28	Vytautas Strolia	Lithuania	1:36	3 (1+1+1+0)	34:42.9	+3:27.7
32	34	Florent Claude	Belgium	1:44	3 (1+0+0+2)	34:46.9	+3:31.7
33	24	Grzegorz Guzik	Poland	1:26	4 (0+1+2+1)	34:47.9	+3:32.7
34	56	Evgeniy Garanichev	Russia	2:26	3 (0+1+1+1)	34:48.5	+3:33.3
35	16	Scott Gow	Canada	1:16	5 (2+0+2+1)	34:50.0	+3:34.8
36	38	Mario Dolder	Switzerland	1:56	3 (0+1+1+1)	34:53.7	+3:38.5
37	36	Mikita Labastau	Belarus	1:52	1 (0+0+1+0)	34:53.8	+3:38.6
38	15	Anton Smolski	Belarus	1:13	4 (1+1+1+1)	35:00.0	+3:44.8
39	22	Nikita Porshnev	Russia	1:22	5 (1+1+1+2)	35:01.2	+3:46.0
40	31	Dominik Landertinger	Austria	1:43	4 (1+1+0+2)	35:10.5	+3:55.3
41	42	Sergii Semenov	Ukraine	2:00	4 (1+1+1+1)	35:10.6	+3:55.4
42	32	Raman Yaliotnau	Belarus	1:44	5 (2+1+1+1)	35:11.9	+3:56.7
43	44	Sean Doherty	United States	2:04	4 (1+1+1+1)	35:13.3	+3:58.1
44	58	Vladimir Iliev	Bulgaria	2:31	5 (0+1+2+2)	35:14.6	+3:59.4
45	41	Thomas Bormolini	Italy	1:59	4 (1+0+1+2)	35:19.8	+4:04.6
46	54	Serafin Wiestner	Switzerland	2:21	4 (2+0+0+2)	35:44.2	+4:29.0
47	52	Tero Seppälä	Finland	2:14	5 (0+2+2+1)	35:46.7	+4:31.5
48	50	Karol Dombrovski	Lithuania	2:14	4 (0+1+2+1)	35:51.6	+4:36.4
49	59	Rene Zahkna	Estonia	2:36	1 (0+1+0+0)	36:03.5	+4:48.3
50	17	Timofey Lapshin	South Korea	1:18	8 (3+2+2+1)	36:21.6	+5:06.4
51	48	Dominik Windisch	Italy	2:11	7 (2+1+2+2)	36:25.8	+5:10.6
52	57	Dimitar Gerdzhikov	Bulgaria	2:31	4 (1+1+2+0)	36:27.9	+5:12.7
53	53	George Buta	Romania	2:18	3 (0+0+1+2)	36:33.9	+5:18.7
54	47	Jakub Štvrtecký	Czech Republic	2:07	6 (1+0+2+3)	36:46.0	+5:30.8
55	12	Matvey Eliseev	Russia	1:09	7 (1+2+2+2)	36:50.5	+5:35.3
56	49	Kosuke Ozaki	Japan	2:13	5 (1+2+1+1)	37:03.6	+5:48.4
57	43	Šimon Bartko	Slovakia	2:01	8 (1+1+4+2)	37:03.6	+5:48.4
58	55	Olli Hiidensalo	Finland	2:22	7 (2+1+1+3)	37:10.8	+5:55.6
59	51	Benjamin Weger	Switzerland	2:14	7 (3+1+1+2)	37:17.8	+6:02.6
60	60	Anton Dudchenko	Ukraine	2:40	4 (1+1+0+2)	37:41.9	+6:26.7
