= Biathlon World Championships 2020 – Men's mass start =

Men's mass start at the Biathlon World Championships 2020
- Venue: South Tyrol Arena
- Location: Antholz-Anterselva, Italy
- Dates: 23 February
- Competitors: 30 from 13 nations
- Winning time: 38:09.5

Medalists
gold medal	Johannes Thingnes Bø	Norway
silver medal	Quentin Fillon Maillet	France
bronze medal	Émilien Jacquelin	France

The Men's mass start competition at the Biathlon World Championships 2020 was held on 23 February 2020.

== Results ==
The race was started at 15:00.

Rank	Bib	Name	Nationality	Time	Penalties (P+P+S+S)	Deficit
1st place, gold medalist(s)	4	Johannes Thingnes Bø	Norway	38:09.5	0 (0+0+0+0)	
2nd place, silver medalist(s)	3	Quentin Fillon Maillet	France	38:51.5	3 (1+0+1+1)	+42.0
3rd place, bronze medalist(s)	1	Émilien Jacquelin	France	39:04.5	2 (1+0+1+0)	+55.0
4	6	Tarjei Bø	Norway	39:05.1	2 (0+0+1+1)	+55.6
5	7	Simon Desthieux	France	39:13.2	1 (0+0+0+1)	+1:03.7
6	16	Felix Leitner	Austria	39:16.2	3 (1+1+1+0)	+1:06.7
7	2	Martin Fourcade	France	39:22.6	3 (1+1+0+1)	+1:13.1
8	9	Johannes Dale	Norway	39:26.6	3 (0+0+2+1)	+1:17.1
9	27	Julian Eberhard	Austria	39:29.1	4 (0+2+2+0)	+1:19.6
10	13	Johannes Kühn	Germany	39:34.7	4 (1+0+2+1)	+1:25.2
11	23	Ondřej Moravec	Czech Republic	39:43.6	2 (0+1+0+1)	+1:34.1
12	8	Benedikt Doll	Germany	39:48.8	4 (0+1+1+2)	+1:39.3
13	10	Vetle Sjåstad Christiansen	Norway	39:52.5	4 (1+0+1+2)	+1:43.0
14	30	Dominik Windisch	Italy	39:56.6	3 (0+1+2+0)	+1:47.1
15	14	Jakov Fak	Slovenia	40:07.8	3 (0+1+0+2)	+1:58.3
16	20	Krasimir Anev	Bulgaria	40:16.7	2 (0+1+0+1)	+2:07.2
17	5	Dominik Landertinger	Austria	40:24.6	3 (0+1+1+1)	+2:15.1
18	19	Lukas Hofer	Italy	40:32.3	3 (1+1+0+1)	+2:22.8
19	21	Jesper Nelin	Sweden	40:35.0	4 (1+0+2+1)	+2:25.5
20	29	Artem Pryma	Ukraine	40:42.2	3 (1+1+1+0)	+2:32.7
21	11	Arnd Peiffer	Germany	40:51.5	5 (2+1+2+0)	+2:42.0
22	18	Peppe Femling	Sweden	41:07.5	3 (1+1+1+0)	+2:58.0
23	26	Dmytro Pidruchnyi	Ukraine	41:23.0	4 (0+2+1+1)	+3:13.5
24	17	Philipp Horn	Germany	41:29.6	7 (2+3+1+1)	+3:20.1
25	28	Benjamin Weger	Switzerland	41:42.5	5 (3+1+0+1)	+3:33.0
26	22	Nikita Porshnev	Russia	41:55.6	4 (0+1+1+2)	+3:46.1
27	15	Sebastian Samuelsson	Sweden	42:13.1	7 (1+2+2+2)	+4:03.6
28	12	Matvey Eliseev	Russia	42:28.1	7 (3+0+3+1)	+4:18.6
29	24	Martin Ponsiluoma	Sweden	43:00.1	8 (0+4+3+1)	+4:50.6
30	25	Martin Otčenáš	Slovakia	43:59.2	4 (1+1+1+1)	+5:49.7
