= Johannes Thingnes Bø =

Norwegian biathlete (born 1993)

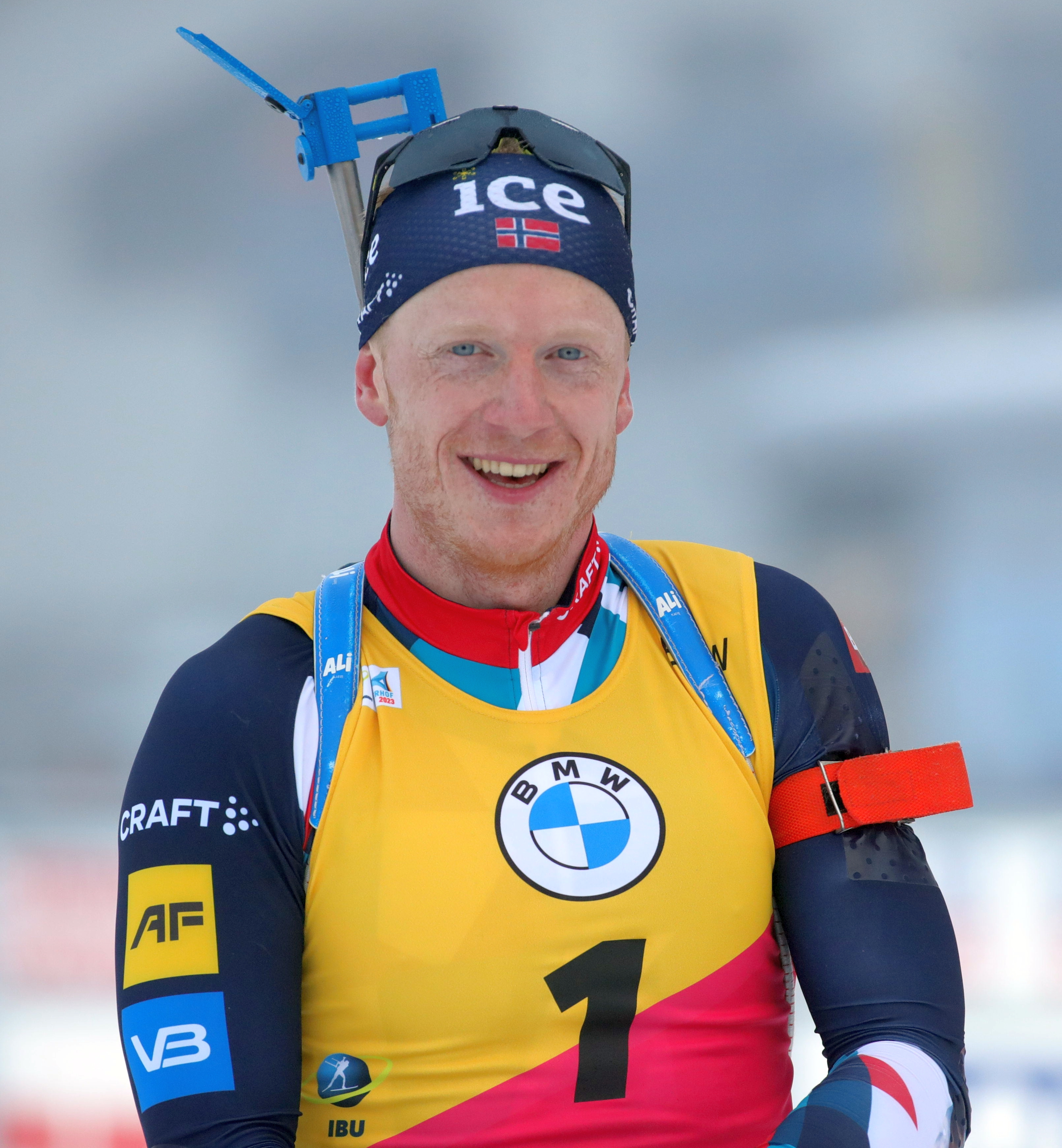
- Thingnes Bø in 2023

Personal information
- Nickname: JTB
- Nationality: Norwegian
- Born: 16 May 1993 (age 33) Stryn, Norway
- Height: 1.87 m (6 ft 2 in)
- Weight: 80 kg (176 lb)

Sport

Professional information
- Sport: Biathlon
- Club: Markane IL
- Skis: Fischer
- World Cup debut: 2013

Olympic Games
- Teams: 3 (2014, 2018, 2022)
- Medals: 9 (5 gold)

World Championships
- Teams: 9 (2015–2025)
- Medals: 43 (23 gold)

World Cup
- Seasons: 13 (2013–2025)
- Individual races: 278
- All races: 365
- Individual victories: 91
- All victories: 134
- Individual podiums: 143
- All podiums: 220
- Overall titles: 5 (2018–19, 2019–20, 2020–21, 2022–23, 2023–24)
- Discipline titles: 13: 3 Individual (2017–18, 2018–19, 2023–24); 4 Sprint (2018–19, 2020–21, 2022–23, 2024–25); 3 Pursuit (2018–19, 2022–23, 2023–24); 3 Mass Start (2018–19, 2019–20, 2023–24)
Medal record
Men's biathlon
Representing Norway
Event	1st	2nd	3rd
Olympic Games	5	2	2
World Championships	23	14	6
Junior World Championships	3	1	0
Youth World Championships	2	0	0
Total	33	17	8
Olympic Games
Gold medal – first place	2018 Pyeongchang	20 km individual
Gold medal – first place	2022 Beijing	10 km sprint
Gold medal – first place	2022 Beijing	15 km mass start
Gold medal – first place	2022 Beijing	4 × 7.5 km relay
Gold medal – first place	2022 Beijing	Mixed relay
Silver medal – second place	2018 Pyeongchang	4 × 7.5 km relay
Silver medal – second place	2018 Pyeongchang	Mixed relay
Bronze medal – third place	2014 Sochi	4 × 7.5 km relay
Bronze medal – third place	2022 Beijing	20 km individual
World Championships
Gold medal – first place	2015 Kontiolahti	10 km sprint
Gold medal – first place	2016 Oslo	15 km mass start
Gold medal – first place	2016 Oslo	4 × 7.5 km relay
Gold medal – first place	2019 Östersund	10 km sprint
Gold medal – first place	2019 Östersund	4 × 7.5 km relay
Gold medal – first place	2019 Östersund	Mixed relay
Gold medal – first place	2019 Östersund	Single mixed relay
Gold medal – first place	2020 Antholz	15 km mass start
Gold medal – first place	2020 Antholz	Mixed relay
Gold medal – first place	2020 Antholz	Single mixed relay
Gold medal – first place	2021 Pokljuka	4 × 7.5 km relay
Gold medal – first place	2021 Pokljuka	Mixed relay
Gold medal – first place	2023 Oberhof	10 km sprint
Gold medal – first place	2023 Oberhof	12.5 km pursuit
Gold medal – first place	2023 Oberhof	20 km individual
Gold medal – first place	2023 Oberhof	Mixed relay
Gold medal – first place	2023 Oberhof	Single mixed relay
Gold medal – first place	2024 Nové Město	12.5 km pursuit
Gold medal – first place	2024 Nové Město	20 km individual
Gold medal – first place	2024 Nové Město	15 km mass start
Gold medal – first place	2025 Lenzerheide	10 km sprint
Gold medal – first place	2025 Lenzerheide	12.5 km pursuit
Gold medal – first place	2025 Lenzerheide	4 × 7.5 km relay
Silver medal – second place	2015 Kontiolahti	4 × 7.5 km relay
Silver medal – second place	2017 Hochfilzen	10 km sprint
Silver medal – second place	2017 Hochfilzen	12.5 km pursuit
Silver medal – second place	2017 Hochfilzen	15 km mass start
Silver medal – second place	2019 Östersund	12.5 km pursuit
Silver medal – second place	2020 Antholz	20 km individual
Silver medal – second place	2020 Antholz	12.5 km pursuit
Silver medal – second place	2020 Antholz	4 × 7.5 km relay
Silver medal – second place	2021 Pokljuka	Single mixed relay
Silver medal – second place	2023 Oberhof	4 × 7.5 km relay
Silver medal – second place	2024 Nové Město	10 km sprint
Silver medal – second place	2024 Nové Město	4 × 7.5 km relay
Silver medal – second place	2024 Nové Město	Mixed relay
Silver medal – second place	2025 Lenzerheide	Single mixed relay
Bronze medal – third place	2015 Kontiolahti	Mixed relay
Bronze medal – third place	2016 Oslo	Mixed relay
Bronze medal – third place	2021 Pokljuka	12.5 km pursuit
Bronze medal – third place	2023 Oberhof	15 km mass start
Bronze medal – third place	2024 Nové Město	Single mixed relay
Bronze medal – third place	2025 Lenzerheide	15 km mass start
Junior World Championships
Gold medal – first place	2012 Kontiolahti	4 × 7.5 km relay
Gold medal – first place	2013 Obertilliach	12.5 km pursuit
Gold medal – first place	2013 Obertilliach	4 × 7.5 km relay
Silver medal – second place	2013 Obertilliach	10 km sprint
Youth World Championships
Gold medal – first place	2012 Kontiolahti	7.5 km sprint
Gold medal – first place	2012 Kontiolahti	10 km pursuit
European Youth Olympic Winter Festival
Gold medal – first place	2011 Liberec	7.5 km sprint
Silver medal – second place	2011 Liberec	12.5 km individual
- Updated on 23 March 2025

Johannes Thingnes Bø (born 16 May 1993) is a Norwegian former biathlete who has achieved significant success in the sport. Thingnes Bø has won the Biathlon World Cup five times, in the 2018/19, 2019/20, 2020/21, 2022/23, and 2023/24 seasons. He is the male biathlete with the second most individual World Cup victories in history, totaling 91, including victories at the Winter Olympic Games.

== Career ==
=== Early career (2009–2019) ===
In 2009, Johannes Thingnes Bø competed in the sprint at the Hovedlandsrennet in Beitostølen, securing a medal in the relay alongside Jarle Midthjell Gjørven, Runar Netland, and Johan Eirik Meland. Later that year, he won two gold medals at the Norwegian National Championships in roller ski shooting in Vik i Sogn, in the Men's 17 category, in both the sprint and pursuit events.

Thingnes Bø's international success began in 2010 and 2011, earning several medals. In 2012, he became a three-time junior world champion and joined the Norwegian senior national team.

=== Breakthrough and dominance: 2018/19 season ===
Johannes Thingnes Bø emerged as a dominant force in the 2018/19 World Cup season. Overcoming a pre-season back injury, Thingnes Bø won six of the first eight individual races and led the World Cup standings by 116 points before Christmas. He continued his exceptional form into the new year, securing podium finishes in every race until the events in Soldier Hollow.

During the 2019 Biathlon World Championships in Östersund, Thingnes Bø won the sprint and three team-event gold medals, adding to his World Cup dominance. He set a record for most individual victories in a single World Cup season, with 16 wins, surpassing Martin Fourcade's record of 14.

=== 2019/20 season: Parental leave and continued success ===
Despite taking parental leave in January 2020, Thingnes Bø maintained his dominance and won the World Cup title for a second consecutive year. His season highlights included victories in Hochfilzen, Le Grand-Bornand, and Nové Město, as well as a strong performance at the World Championships in Antholz-Anterselva, where he won six medals, including individual gold in the mass start.

The 2019/20 season concluded amidst the COVID-19 pandemic, with events in Kontiolahti held without spectators and others canceled. Thingnes Bø secured the overall World Cup title in a dramatic final race, edging out retiring rival Martin Fourcade by two points.

=== Later career and achievements ===
Thingnes Bø continued to excel in subsequent seasons, cementing his status as one of the sport's all-time greats. His achievements include multiple World Cup titles, Olympic medals, and recognition with the Holmenkollen Medal in 2021 for his contributions to the sport.

In March 2025, Johannes Thingnes Bø and his brother Tarjei Bø retired from competitions.

== Awards and honors ==
- Holmenkollen Medal (2021)

== Biathlon results ==
All results are sourced from the International Biathlon Union.

=== Olympic Games ===
9 medals (5 gold, 2 silver, 2 bronze)

Event	Individual	Sprint	Pursuit	Mass start	Relay	Mixed relay
(Russia) 2014 Sochi	11th	54th	32nd	8th	Bronze	—
(South Korea) 2018 Pyeongchang	Gold	31st	21st	16th	Silver	Silver
(China) 2022 Beijing	Bronze	Gold	5th	Gold	Gold	Gold

*The mixed relay was added as an event in 2014.

=== World Championships ===
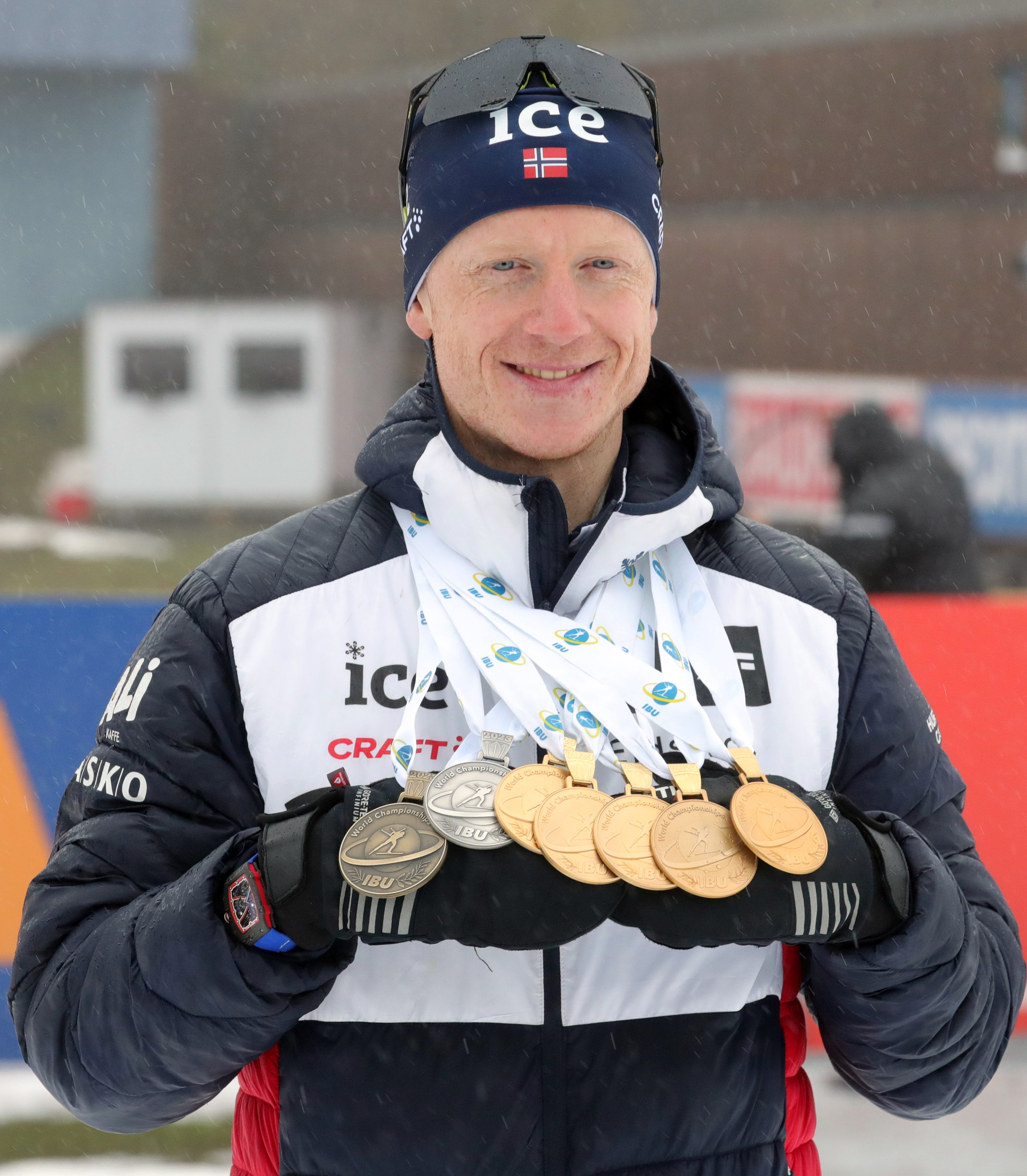
Thingnes Bø won a medal in all 7 races at the Biathlon World Championships 2023, including a record-equalling 5 golds.

43 medals (23 gold, 14 silver, 6 bronze)

Event	Individual	Sprint	Pursuit	Mass start	Relay	Mixed relay	Single mixed relay
(Finland) 2015 Kontiolahti	7th	Gold	31st	6th	Silver	Bronze	—N/a
(Norway) 2016 Oslo Holmenkollen	4th	4th	4th	Gold	Gold	Bronze	—N/a
(Austria) 2017 Hochfilzen	8th	Silver	Silver	Silver	8th	8th	—N/a
(Sweden) 2019 Östersund	9th	Gold	Silver	13th	Gold	Gold	Gold
(Italy) 2020 Antholz-Anterselva	Silver	5th	Silver	Gold	Silver	Gold	Gold
(Slovenia) 2021 Pokljuka	5th	5th	Bronze	8th	Gold	Gold	Silver
(Germany) 2023 Oberhof	Gold	Gold	Gold	Bronze	Silver	Gold	Gold
(Czech Republic) 2024 Nové Město	Gold	Silver	Gold	Gold	Silver	Silver	Bronze
(Switzerland) 2025 Lenzerheide	20th	Gold	Gold	Bronze	Gold	4th	Silver

*During Olympic seasons competitions are only held for those events not included in the Olympic program.
**The single mixed relay was added as an event in 2019.

Event
Event	Non-Team				Team				Total			
Event	1st place, gold medalist(s)	2nd place, silver medalist(s)	3rd place, bronze medalist(s)	Σ	1st place, gold medalist(s)	2nd place, silver medalist(s)	3rd place, bronze medalist(s)	Σ	1st place, gold medalist(s)	2nd place, silver medalist(s)	3rd place, bronze medalist(s)	Σ
Olympic Games	3	0	1	4	2	2	1	5	5	2	2	9
World Championships	12	7	3	22	11	7	3	21	23	14	6	43
Total	15	7	4	26	13	9	4	26	28	16	8	52

=== World Cup ===
==== Season standings ====
Season	Age	Overall	Individual	Sprint	Pursuit	Mass start
2012–13	19	59	—	61	49	—
2013–14	20	3	12	3	5	10
2014–15	21	5	5	5	15	9
2015–16	22	2	5	3	3	4
2016–17	23	3	4	5	4	6
2017–18	24	2	1	2	2	2
2018–19	25	1	1	1	1	1
2019–20	26	1	2	3	4	1
2020–21	27	1	2	1	2	2
2021–22	28	13	4	20	22	22
2022–23	29	1	7	1	1	2
2023–24	30	1	1	2	1	1
2024–25	31	2	7	1	2	6

- Standings through 23 March 2025

==== Individual podiums ====
- 91 victories – (40 Sp, 27 Pu, 16 MS, 6 Ind, 2 Short Ind)
- 143 podiums

No.	Season	Date	Location	Level	Race	Place
1	2013–14	14 December 2013	(France) Le Grand-Bornand	World Cup	Sprint	1st
2	2013–14	15 December 2013	(France) Le Grand-Bornand	World Cup	Pursuit	1st
3	2013–14	13 March 2014	(Finland) Kontiolahti	World Cup	Sprint	1st
4	2013–14	15 March 2014	(Finland) Kontiolahti	World Cup	Sprint	1st
5	2013–14	16 March 2014	(Finland) Kontiolahti	World Cup	Pursuit	1st
6	2014–15	12 December 2014	(Austria) Hochfilzen	World Cup	Sprint	1st
7	2014–15	17 January 2015	(Germany) Ruhpolding	World Cup	Sprint	1st
8	2014–15	7 March 2015	(Finland) Kontiolahti	World Championships	Sprint	1st
9	2015–16	8 January 2016	(Germany) Ruhpolding	World Cup	Sprint	1st
10	2015–16	23 January 2016	(Italy) Antholz-Anterselva	World Cup	Pursuit	3rd
11	2015–16	11 February 2016	(United States) Presque Isle	World Cup	Sprint	1st
12	2015–16	12 February 2016	(United States) Presque Isle	World Cup	Pursuit	2nd
13	2015–16	13 March 2016	(Norway) Oslo	World Championships	Mass Start	1st
14	2015–16	19 March 2016	(Russia) Khanty-Mansiysk	World Cup	Pursuit	2nd
15	2016–17	1 December 2016	(Sweden) Östersund	World Cup	Individual	2nd
16	2016–17	9 December 2016	(Slovenia) Pokljuka	World Cup	Sprint	2nd
17	2016–17	22 January 2017	(Italy) Antholz-Anterselva	World Cup	Mass Start	1st
18	2016–17	11 February 2017	(Austria) Hochfilzen	World Championships	Sprint	2nd
19	2016–17	12 February 2017	(Austria) Hochfilzen	World Championships	Pursuit	2nd
20	2016–17	19 February 2017	(Austria) Hochfilzen	World Championships	Mass Start	2nd
21	2016–17	17 March 2017	(Norway) Oslo	World Cup	Sprint	1st
22	2016–17	18 March 2017	(Norway) Oslo	World Cup	Pursuit	3rd
23	2017–18	30 November 2017	(Sweden) Östersund	World Cup	Individual	1st
24	2017–18	8 December 2017	(Austria) Hochfilzen	World Cup	Sprint	1st
25	2017–18	9 December 2017	(Austria) Hochfilzen	World Cup	Pursuit	1st
26	2017–18	15 December 2017	(France) Le Grand-Bornand	World Cup	Sprint	1st
27	2017–18	16 December 2017	(France) Le Grand-Bornand	World Cup	Pursuit	1st
28	2017–18	17 December 2017	(France) Le Grand-Bornand	World Cup	Mass Start	2nd
29	2017–18	5 January 2018	(Germany) Oberhof	World Cup	Sprint	3rd
30	2017–18	6 January 2018	(Germany) Oberhof	World Cup	Pursuit	2nd
31	2017–18	10 January 2018	(Germany) Ruhpolding	World Cup	Individual	3rd
32	2017–18	14 January 2018	(Germany) Ruhpolding	World Cup	Mass Start	1st
33	2017–18	19 January 2018	(Italy) Antholz-Anterselva	World Cup	Sprint	1st
34	2017–18	20 January 2018	(Italy) Antholz-Anterselva	World Cup	Pursuit	1st
35	2017–18	15 February 2018	(South Korea) Pyeongchang	Winter Olympic Games	Individual	1st
36	2017–18	15 March 2018	(Norway) Oslo	World Cup	Sprint	2nd
37	2017–18	17 March 2018	(Norway) Oslo	World Cup	Pursuit	3rd
38	2017–18	23 March 2018	(Russia) Tyumen	World Cup	Pursuit	2nd
39	2017–18	24 March 2018	(Russia) Tyumen	World Cup	Mass Start	3rd
40	2018–19	7 December 2018	(Slovenia) Pokljuka	World Cup	Sprint	1st
41	2018–19	9 December 2018	(Slovenia) Pokljuka	World Cup	Pursuit	1st
42	2018–19	14 December 2018	(Austria) Hochfilzen	World Cup	Sprint	1st
43	2018–19	20 December 2018	(Czech Republic) Nové Město na Moravě	World Cup	Sprint	1st
44	2018–19	22 December 2018	(Czech Republic) Nové Město na Moravě	World Cup	Pursuit	1st
45	2018–19	23 December 2018	(Czech Republic) Nové Město na Moravě	World Cup	Mass Start	1st
46	2018–19	11 January 2019	(Germany) Oberhof	World Cup	Sprint	2nd
47	2018–19	12 January 2019	(Germany) Oberhof	World Cup	Pursuit	1st
48	2018–19	17 January 2019	(Germany) Ruhpolding	World Cup	Sprint	1st
49	2018–19	20 January 2019	(Germany) Ruhpolding	World Cup	Mass Start	1st
50	2018–19	25 January 2019	(Italy) Antholz-Anterselva	World Cup	Sprint	1st
51	2018–19	26 January 2019	(Italy) Antholz-Anterselva	World Cup	Pursuit	1st
52	2018–19	27 January 2019	(Italy) Antholz-Anterselva	World Cup	Mass Start	2nd
53	2018–19	7 February 2019	(Canada) Canmore	World Cup	Short Individual	1st
54	2018–19	9 March 2019	(Sweden) Östersund	World Championships	Sprint	1st
55	2018–19	10 March 2019	(Sweden) Östersund	World Championships	Pursuit	2nd
56	2018–19	22 March 2019	(Norway) Oslo	World Cup	Sprint	1st
57	2018–19	23 March 2019	(Norway) Oslo	World Cup	Pursuit	1st
58	2018–19	24 March 2019	(Norway) Oslo	World Cup	Mass Start	1st
59	2019–20	1 December 2019	(Sweden) Östersund	World Cup	Sprint	1st
60	2019–20	13 December 2019	(Austria) Hochfilzen	World Cup	Sprint	1st
61	2019–20	14 December 2019	(Austria) Hochfilzen	World Cup	Pursuit	1st
62	2019–20	21 December 2019	(France) Le Grand Bornand	World Cup	Pursuit	1st
63	2019–20	22 December 2019	(France) Le Grand Bornand	World Cup	Mass Start	1st
64	2019–20	23 January 2020	(Slovenia) Pokljuka	World Cup	Individual	1st
65	2019–20	26 January 2020	(Slovenia) Pokljuka	World Cup	Mass Start	3rd
66	2019–20	16 February 2020	(Italy) Antholz-Anterselva	World Championships	Pursuit	2nd
67	2019–20	19 February 2020	(Italy) Antholz-Anterselva	World Championships	Individual	2nd
68	2019–20	23 February 2020	(Italy) Antholz-Anterselva	World Championships	Mass Start	1st
69	2019–20	6 March 2020	(Czech Republic) Nové Město na Moravě	World Cup	Sprint	1st
70	2019–20	8 March 2020	(Czech Republic) Nové Město na Moravě	World Cup	Mass Start	1st
71	2019–20	12 March 2020	(Finland) Kontiolahti	World Cup	Sprint	1st
72	2020–21	28 November 2020	(Finland) Kontiolahti	World Cup	Individual	2nd
73	2020–21	29 November 2020	(Finland) Kontiolahti	World Cup	Sprint	1st
74	2020–21	3 December 2020	(Finland) Kontiolahti	World Cup	Sprint	3rd
75	2020–21	5 December 2020	(Finland) Kontiolahti	World Cup	Pursuit	3rd
76	2020–21	17 December 2020	(Austria) Hochfilzen	World Cup	Sprint	3rd
77	2020–21	19 December 2020	(Austria) Hochfilzen	World Cup	Pursuit	3rd
78	2020–21	8 January 2021	(Germany) Oberhof	World Cup	Sprint	1st
79	2020–21	13 January 2021	(Germany) Oberhof	World Cup	Sprint	1st
80	2020–21	24 January 2021	(Italy) Antholz-Anterselva	World Cup	Mass Start	1st
81	2020–21	14 February 2021	(Slovenia) Pokljuka	World Championships	Pursuit	3rd
82	2020–21	7 March 2021	(Czech Republic) Nové Město na Moravě	World Cup	Pursuit	2nd
83	2020–21	13 March 2021	(Czech Republic) Nové Město na Moravě	World Cup	Pursuit	2nd
84	2020–21	20 March 2021	(Sweden) Östersund	World Cup	Pursuit	2nd
85	2020–21	21 March 2021	(Sweden) Östersund	World Cup	Mass Start	3rd
86	2021–22	28 November 2021	(Sweden) Östersund	World Cup	Sprint	3rd
87	2021–22	17 December 2021	(France) Le Grand-Bornand	World Cup	Sprint	1st
88	2021–22	22 January 2022	(Italy) Antholz-Anterselva	World Cup	Mass Start	2nd
89	2021–22	8 February 2022	(China) Beijing	Winter Olympic Games	Individual	3rd
90	2021–22	12 February 2022	(China) Beijing	Winter Olympic Games	Sprint	1st
91	2021–22	18 February 2022	(China) Beijing	Winter Olympic Games	Mass start	1st
92	2022–23	3 December 2022	(Finland) Kontiolahti	World Cup	Sprint	1st
93	2022–23	4 December 2022	(Finland) Kontiolahti	World Cup	Pursuit	1st
94	2022–23	9 December 2022	(Austria) Hochfilzen	World Cup	Sprint	1st
95	2022–23	11 December 2022	(Austria) Hochfilzen	World Cup	Pursuit	1st
96	2022–23	15 December 2022	(France) Le Grand-Bornand	World Cup	Sprint	1st
97	2022–23	17 December 2022	(France) Le Grand-Bornand	World Cup	Pursuit	3rd
98	2022–23	18 December 2022	(France) Le Grand-Bornand	World Cup	Mass Start	3rd
99	2022–23	6 January 2023	(Slovenia) Pokljuka	World Cup	Sprint	1st
100	2022–23	7 January 2023	(Slovenia) Pokljuka	World Cup	Pursuit	1st
101	2022–23	11 January 2023	(Germany) Ruhpolding	World Cup	Individual	1st
102	2022–23	15 January 2023	(Germany) Ruhpolding	World Cup	Mass Start	1st
103	2022–23	20 January 2023	(Italy) Antholz-Anterselva	World Cup	Sprint	1st
104	2022–23	21 January 2023	(Italy) Antholz-Anterselva	World Cup	Pursuit	1st
105	2022–23	11 February 2023	(Germany) Oberhof	World Championships	Sprint	1st
106	2022–23	12 February 2023	(Germany) Oberhof	World Championships	Pursuit	1st
107	2022–23	14 February 2023	(Germany) Oberhof	World Championships	Individual	1st
108	2022–23	19 February 2023	(Germany) Oberhof	World Championships	Mass Start	3rd
109	2022–23	2 March 2023	(Czech Republic) Nové Město na Moravě	World Cup	Sprint	1st
110	2022–23	4 March 2023	(Czech Republic) Nové Město na Moravě	World Cup	Pursuit	1st
111	2022–23	16 March 2023	(Norway) Oslo	World Cup	Sprint	1st
112	2022–23	18 March 2023	(Norway) Oslo	World Cup	Pursuit	1st
113	2022–23	19 March 2023	(Norway) Oslo	World Cup	Mass Start	1st
114	2023–24	26 November 2023	(Sweden) Östersund	World Cup	Individual	3rd
115	2023–24	9 December 2023	(Austria) Hochfilzen	World Cup	Pursuit	1st
116	2023–24	15 December 2023	(Switzerland) Lenzerheide	World Cup	Sprint	2nd
117	2023–24	16 December 2023	(Switzerland) Lenzerheide	World Cup	Pursuit	1st
118	2023–24	17 December 2023	(Switzerland) Lenzerheide	World Cup	Mass Start	1st
119	2023–24	14 January 2024	(Germany) Ruhpolding	World Cup	Pursuit	3rd
120	2023–24	18 January 2024	(Italy) Antholz-Anterselva	World Cup	Short Individual	1st
121	2023–24	10 February 2024	(Czech Republic) Nové Město na Moravě	World Championships	Sprint	2nd
122	2023–24	11 February 2024	(Czech Republic) Nové Město na Moravě	World Championships	Pursuit	1st
123	2023–24	14 February 2024	(Czech Republic) Nové Město na Moravě	World Championships	Individual	1st
124	2023–24	18 February 2024	(Czech Republic) Nové Město na Moravě	World Championships	Mass Start	1st
125	2023–24	10 March 2024	(United States) Soldier Hollow	World Cup	Pursuit	1st
126	2023–24	15 March 2024	(Canada) Canmore	World Cup	Sprint	1st
127	2023–24	16 March 2024	(Canada) Canmore	World Cup	Pursuit	1st
128	2023–24	17 March 2024	(Canada) Canmore	World Cup	Mass Start	1st
129	2024–25	3 December 2024	(Finland) Kontiolahti	World Cup	Short Individual	2nd
130	2024–25	13 December 2024	(Austria) Hochfilzen	World Cup	Sprint	1st
131	2024–25	14 December 2024	(Austria) Hochfilzen	World Cup	Pursuit	1st
132	2024–25	19 December 2024	(France) Le Grand-Bornand	World Cup	Sprint	2nd
133	2024–25	21 December 2024	(France) Le Grand-Bornand	World Cup	Pursuit	1st
134	2024–25	22 December 2024	(France) Le Grand-Bornand	World Cup	Mass Start	3rd
135	2024–25	11 January 2025	(Germany) Oberhof	World Cup	Pursuit	3rd
136	2024–25	19 January 2025	(Germany) Ruhpolding	World Cup	Mass Start	3rd
137	2024–25	15 February 2025	(Switzerland) Lenzerheide	World Championships	Sprint	1st
138	2024–25	16 February 2025	(Switzerland) Lenzerheide	World Championships	Pursuit	1st
139	2024–25	23 February 2025	(Switzerland) Lenzerheide	World Championships	Mass Start	3rd
140	2024–25	6 March 2025	(Czech Republic) Nové Město na Moravě	World Cup	Sprint	3rd
141	2024–25	8 March 2025	(Czech Republic) Nové Město na Moravě	World Cup	Pursuit	3rd
142	2024–25	21 March 2025	(Norway) Oslo	World Cup	Sprint	1st
143	2024–25	22 March 2025	(Norway) Oslo	World Cup	Pursuit	2nd

*Results are from UIPMB and IBU races which include the Biathlon World Cup, Biathlon World Championships.

==== Team podiums ====
- 43 victories – (28 Relays, 12 Mixed relays, 3 Single mixed relays)
- 77 podiums

No.	Season	Date	Location	Level	Race	Place
1	2012–13	10 March 2013	(Russia) Sochi	World Cup	Men's 4 × 7.5 km Relay	3rd
2	2013–14	22 February 2014	(Russia) Sochi	Olympic Games	Men's 4 × 7.5 km Relay	3rd
3	2014–15	13 December 2014	(Austria) Hochfilzen	World Cup	Men's 4 × 7.5 km Relay	3rd
4	2014–15	8 January 2015	(Germany) Oberhof	World Cup	Men's 4 × 7.5 km Relay	2nd
5	2014–15	15 January 2015	(Germany) Ruhpolding	World Cup	Men's 4 × 7.5 km Relay	1st
6	2014–15	25 January 2015	(Italy) Anterselva	World Cup	Men's 4 × 7.5 km Relay	1st
7	2014–15	6 February 2015	(Czech Republic) Nové Město	World Cup	Mixed 2×6 km + 2×7.5 km Relay	1st
8	2014–15	5 March 2015	(Finland) Kontiolahti	World Championships	Mixed 2×6 km + 2×7.5 km Relay	3rd
9	2014–15	14 March 2015	(Finland) Kontiolahti	World Championships	Men's 4 × 7.5 km Relay	2nd
10	2015–16	29 November 2015	(Sweden) Östersund	World Cup	Mixed 2×6 km + 2×7.5 km Relay	1st
11	2015–16	13 December 2015	(Austria) Hochfilzen	World Cup	Men's 4 × 7.5 km Relay	2nd
12	2015–16	15 January 2016	(Germany) Ruhpolding	World Cup	Men's 4 × 7.5 km Relay	1st
13	2015–16	24 January 2016	(Italy) Anterselva	World Cup	Men's 4 × 7.5 km Relay	3rd
14	2015–16	13 February 2016	(United States) Presque Isle	World Cup	Men's 4 × 7.5 km Relay	1st
15	2015–16	3 March 2016	(Norway) Oslo	World Championship	Mixed 2×6 km + 2×7.5 km Relay	3rd
16	2015–16	12 March 2016	(Norway) Oslo	World Championship	Men's 4 × 7.5 km Relay	1st
17	2016–17	27 November 2016	(Sweden) Östersund	World Cup	Mixed 2×6 km + 2×7.5 km Relay	1st
18	2016–17	21 January 2017	(Italy) Antholz-Anterselva	World Cup	Men's 4 × 7.5 km Relay	2nd
19	2017–18	26 November 2017	(Sweden) Östersund	World Cup	Mixed 2×6 km + 2×7.5 km Relay	1st
20	2017–18	12 January 2018	(Germany) Ruhpolding	World Cup	Men's 4 × 7.5 km Relay	1st
21	2017–18	20 February 2018	(South Korea) Pyeongchang	Olympic Games	Mixed 2×6 km + 2×7.5 km Relay	2nd
22	2017–18	23 February 2018	(South Korea) Pyeongchang	Olympic Games	Men's 4 × 7.5 km Relay	2nd
23	2017–18	10 March 2018	(Finland) Kontiolahti	World Cup	Single Mixed 1×6 km + 1×7.5 km Relay	3rd
24	2017–18	18 March 2018	(Norway) Oslo	World Cup	Men's 4 × 7.5 km Relay	1st
25	2018–19	18 January 2019	(Germany) Ruhpolding	World Cup	Men's 4 × 7.5 km Relay	1st
26	2018–19	8 February 2019	(Canada) Canmore	World Cup	Men's 4 × 7.5 km Relay	1st
27	2018–19	17 February 2019	(United States) Salt Lake City	World Cup	Mixed 2×6 km + 2×7.5 km Relay	3rd
28	2018–19	7 March 2019	(Sweden) Östersund	World Championships	Mixed 2×6 km + 2×7.5 km Relay	1st
29	2018–19	14 March 2019	(Sweden) Östersund	World Championships	Single Mixed 1×6 km + 1×7.5 km Relay	1st
30	2018–19	16 March 2019	(Sweden) Östersund	World Championships	Men's 4 × 7.5 km Relay	1st
31	2019–20	30 November 2019	(Sweden) Östersund	World Cup	Mixed 4 × 6 km Relay	2nd
32	2019–20	7 December 2019	(Sweden) Östersund	World Cup	Men's 4 × 7.5 km Relay	1st
33	2019–20	15 December 2019	(Austria) Hochfilzen	World Cup	Men's 4 × 7.5 km Relay	1st
34	2019–20	25 January 2020	(Slovenia) Pokljuka	World Cup	Mixed 4 × 7.5 km Relay	2nd
35	2019–20	13 February 2020	(Italy) Antholz-Anterselva	World Championships	Mixed 4 × 6 km Relay	1st
36	2019–20	20 February 2020	(Italy) Antholz-Anterselva	World Championships	Single Mixed 1×6 km + 1×7.5 km Relay	1st
37	2019–20	22 February 2020	(Italy) Antholz-Anterselva	World Championships	Men's 4 × 7.5 km Relay	2nd
38	2019–20	7 March 2020	(Czech Republic) Nové Město	World Cup	Men's 4 × 7.5 km Relay	1st
39	2020–21	6 December 2020	(Finland) Kontiolahti	World Cup	Men's 4 × 7.5 km Relay	1st
40	2020–21	13 December 2020	(Austria) Hochfilzen	World Cup	Men's 4 × 7.5 km Relay	2nd
41	2020–21	10 January 2021	(Germany) Oberhof	World Cup	Single Mixed 1×6 km + 1×7.5 km Relay	3rd
42	2020–21	15 January 2021	(Germany) Oberhof	World Cup	Men's 4 × 7.5 km Relay	2nd
43	2020–21	23 January 2021	(Italy) Antholz-Anterselva	World Cup	Men's 4 × 7.5 km Relay	2nd
44	2020–21	10 February 2021	(Slovenia) Pokljuka	World Championship	Mixed 4 × 7.5 km Relay	1st
45	2020–21	18 February 2021	(Slovenia) Pokljuka	World Championship	Single Mixed 1×6 km + 1×7.5 km Relay	2nd
46	2020–21	20 February 2021	(Slovenia) Pokljuka	World Championship	Men's 4 × 7.5 km Relay	1st
47	2020–21	5 March 2021	(Czech Republic) Nové Město	World Cup	Men's 4 × 7.5 km Relay	3rd
48	2020–21	14 March 2021	(Czech Republic) Nové Město	World Cup	Mixed 4 × 6 km Relay	1st
49	2021–22	4 December 2021	(Sweden) Östersund	World Cup	Men's 4 × 7.5 km Relay	1st
50	2021–22	12 December 2021	(Austria) Hochfilzen	World Cup	Men's 4 × 7.5 km Relay	1st
51	2021–22	8 January 2022	(Germany) Oberhof	World Cup	Mixed 4 × 7.5 km Relay	1st
52	2021–22	23 January 2022	(Italy) Antholz-Anterselva	World Cup	Men's 4 × 7.5 km Relay	1st
53	2021–22	5 February 2022	(China) Beijing	Olympic Games	Mixed 4 × 7.5 km Relay	1st
54	2021–22	15 February 2022	(China) Beijing	Olympic Games	Men's 4 × 7.5 km Relay	1st
55	2022–23	1 December 2022	(Finland) Kontiolahti	World Cup	Men's 4 × 7.5 km Relay	1st
56	2022–23	10 December 2022	(Austria) Hochfilzen	World Cup	Men's 4 × 7.5 km Relay	1st
57	2022–23	13 January 2023	(Germany) Ruhpolding	World Cup	Men's 4 × 7.5 km Relay	1st
58	2022–23	22 January 2023	(Italy) Antholz-Anterselva	World Cup	Men's 4 × 7.5 km Relay	1st
59	2022–23	8 February 2023	(Germany) Oberhof	World Championships	Mixed 4 × 6 km Relay	1st
60	2022–23	16 February 2023	(Germany) Oberhof	World Championships	Single Mixed 1×6 km + 1×7.5 km Relay	1st
61	2022–23	18 February 2023	(Germany) Oberhof	World Championships	Men's 4 × 7.5 km Relay	2nd
62	2023–24	25 November 2023	(Sweden) Östersund	World Cup	Mixed 4 × 6 km Relay	2nd
63	2023–24	30 November 2023	(Sweden) Östersund	World Cup	Men's 4 × 7.5 km Relay	1st
64	2023–24	10 December 2023	(Austria) Hochfilzen	World Cup	Men's 4 × 7.5 km Relay	1st
65	2023–24	7 January 2024	(Germany) Oberhof	World Cup	Men's 4 × 7.5 km Relay	1st
66	2023–24	20 January 2024	(Italy) Antholz-Anterselva	World Cup	Mixed 4 × 6 km Relay	1st
67	2023–24	7 February 2024	(Czech Republic) Nové Město	World Championships	Mixed 4 × 6 km Relay	2nd
68	2023–24	15 February 2024	(Czech Republic) Nové Město	World Championships	Single Mixed 1×6 km + 1×7.5 km Relay	3rd
69	2023–24	17 February 2024	(Czech Republic) Nové Město	World Championships	Men's 4 × 7.5 km Relay	2nd
70	2023–24	3 March 2024	(Norway) Oslo	World Cup	Mixed 4 × 6 km Relay	3rd
71	2023–24	8 March 2024	(United States) Soldier Hollow	World Cup	Men's 4 × 7.5 km Relay	1st
72	2024–25	1 December 2024	(Finland) Kontiolahti	World Cup	Men's 4 × 7.5 km Relay	2nd
73	2024–25	15 December 2024	(Austria) Hochfilzen	World Cup	Men's 4 × 7.5 km Relay	2nd
74	2024–25	25 January 2025	(Italy) Antholz-Anterselva	World Cup	Men's 4 × 7.5 km Relay	2nd
75	2024–25	20 February 2025	(Switzerland) Lenzerheide	World Championships	Single Mixed 1×6 km + 1×7.5 km Relay	2nd
76	2024–25	22 February 2025	(Switzerland) Lenzerheide	World Championships	Men's 4 × 7.5 km Relay	1st
77	2024–25	9 March 2025	(Czech Republic) Nové Město	World Cup	Men's 4 × 7.5 km Relay	2nd

== Distinctions ==
=== National distinctions ===
- 2012 – Karolineprisen – awarded national talents within culture and sports.

== Personal life ==
Johannes Thingnes Bø married Hedda Kløvstad Dæhli on 30 June 2018. The couple has two children: a son, Gustav, born in January 2020, and a daughter, Sofia, born in the summer of 2023.

He is the younger brother of fellow biathlete Tarjei Bø, who is also a successful competitor in the sport.
