= Jules Burnotte =

Canadian biathlete

Personal information
- Born: December 29, 1996 (age 29) Sherbrooke, Quebec, Canada
- Height: 6 ft 5 in (196 cm)

Sport
- Country: Canada
- Sport: Biathlon
Medal record
Biathlon Junior World Championships
| Silver medal – second place | 2014 Presque Isle | 3 × 7.5 km relay |

Jules Burnotte (born December 29, 1996) is a Canadian biathlete from Sherbrooke, Quebec.

== Career ==
=== Junior ===
Burnotte made his Canadian debut at the Biathlon Junior World Championships 2014 and won silver in the men's youth 3 × 7.5 km relay.

=== Senior ===
In 2020, at the IBU World Championships, Burnotte had his career best performance, a 28th-place finish in the individual event. Burnotte was part of the Canadian team during the 2021–22 Biathlon IBU Cup season.

In January 2022, Burnotte was named to Canada's 2022 Olympic team. At the games, Burnotte was part of the relay team that finished in 6th, Canada's highest ever placement in the event.

=== Olympic Games ===
0 medals

| Event | Individual | Sprint | Pursuit | Mass start | Relay | Mixed relay |
|---|---|---|---|---|---|---|
| (China) 2022 Beijing | 36th | 29th | 28th | 18th | 6th | — |

=== World Championships results ===
| Event | Individual | Sprint | Pursuit | Mass start | Relay | Mixed relay | Single mixed relay |
|---|---|---|---|---|---|---|---|
| (Sweden) 2019 Östersund | DNS | 76th | — | — | 13th | — | — |
| (Italy) 2020 Antholz | 28th | 69th | — | — | 14th | — | — |
