= Émilien Jacquelin =

French biathlete (born 1995)

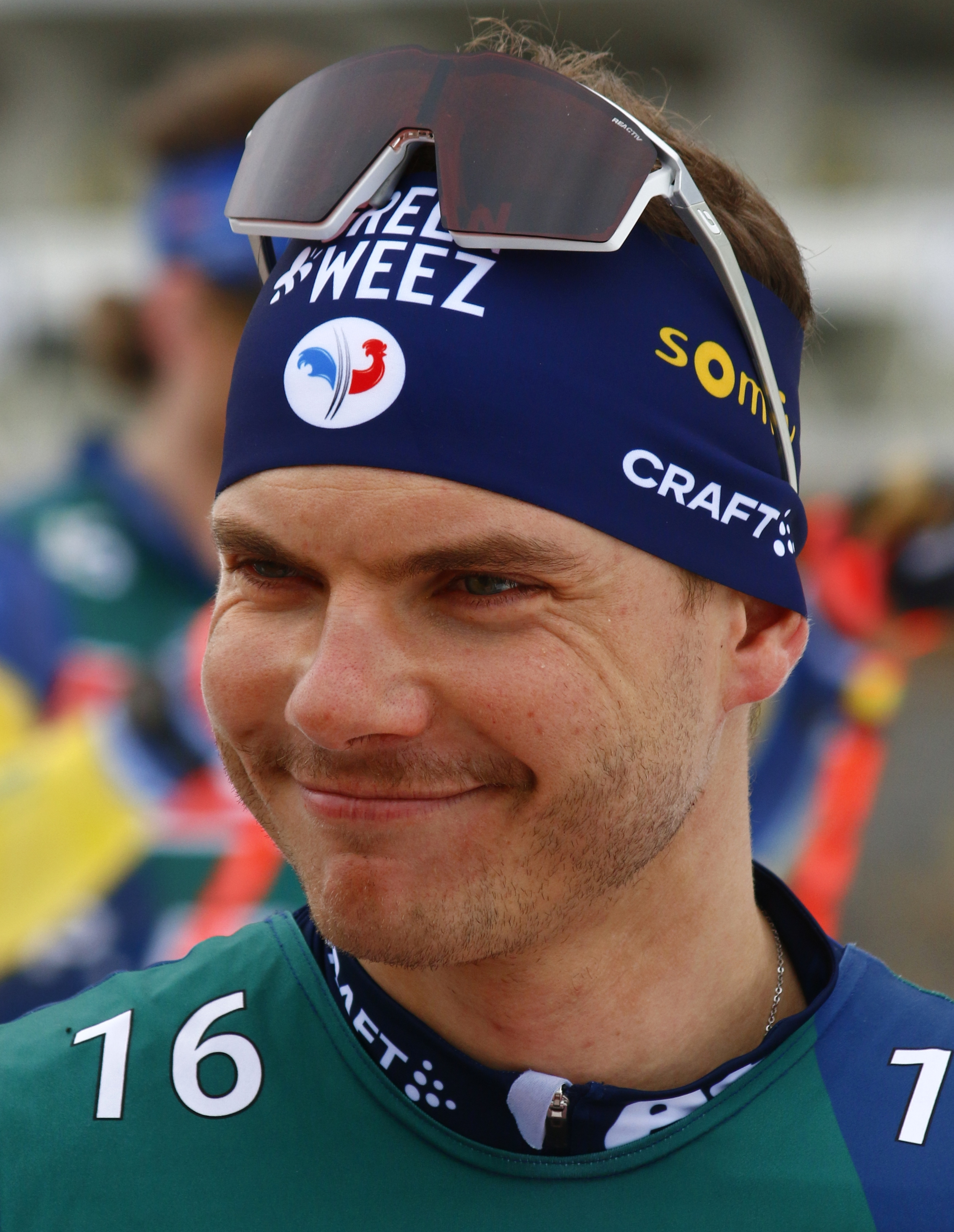
- Jacquelin in 2024

Personal information
- Nationality: French
- Born: 11 July 1995 (age 31) Grenoble, France
- Height: 1.87 m (6 ft 2 in)
- Weight: 79 kg (174 lb)

Sport

Professional information
- Sport: Biathlon
- Club: Csn Villard de Lans
- Skis: Rossignol
- World Cup debut: 30 November 2017

Olympic Games
- Teams: 2 (2018, 2022)
- Medals: 2

World Championships
- Teams: 6 (2019–2025)
- Medals: 10 (5 gold)

World Cup
- Seasons: 7 (2017/18–)
- Individual victories: 3
- All victories: 11
- Discipline titles: 1: 1 Pursuit (2019–20)
Medal record
Men's biathlon
Representing France
Event	1st	2nd	3rd
Olympic Games	1	2	1
World Championships	5	0	5
Total	6	2	6
Olympic Games
Gold medal – first place	2026 Milano Cortina	4 × 7.5 km relay
Silver medal – second place	2022 Beijing	4 × 7.5 km relay
Silver medal – second place	2022 Beijing	Mixed relay
Bronze medal – third place	2026 Milano Cortina	12.5 km pursuit
World Championships
Gold medal – first place	2020 Antholz	12.5 km pursuit
Gold medal – first place	2020 Antholz	4 × 7.5 km relay
Gold medal – first place	2021 Pokljuka	12.5 km pursuit
Gold medal – first place	2023 Oberhof	4 × 7.5 km relay
Gold medal – first place	2025 Lenzerheide	Mixed relay
Bronze medal – third place	2020 Antholz	15 km mass start
Bronze medal – third place	2020 Antholz	Single mixed relay
Bronze medal – third place	2021 Pokljuka	10 km sprint
Bronze medal – third place	2023 Oberhof	Mixed relay
Bronze medal – third place	2024 Nové Město	4 × 7.5 km relay
European Championships
Silver medal – second place	2018 Ridnaun	Single Mixed Relay
Junior World Championships
Bronze medal – third place	2015 Minsk	4 × 7.5 km Relay
Junior European Championships
Silver medal – second place	2016 Pokljuka	Pursuit
Youth World Championships
Bronze medal – third place	2014 Presque Isle	12.5 km individual

Émilien Jacquelin (French pronunciation: [emiljɛ̃ ʒaklɛ̃]; born 11 July 1995) is a French biathlete. He competed in the 2018, 2022 and 2026 Winter Olympics.

== Biathlon results ==
All results are sourced from the International Biathlon Union.

=== Olympic Games ===
4 medals (1 gold, 2 silver, 1 bronze)

Event	Individual	Sprint	Pursuit	Mass start	Relay	Mixed relay
(South Korea) 2018 Pyeongchang	77th	—	—	—	5th	—
(China) 2022 Beijing	72nd	9th	9th	22nd	Silver	Silver
(Italy) 2026 Milano-Cortina	55th	4th	Bronze	12th	Gold	—

=== World Championships ===
9 medals (4 gold, 5 bronze)

Event	Individual	Sprint	Pursuit	Mass start	Relay	Mixed relay	Single mixed relay
(Sweden) 2019 Östersund	—	24th	29th	—	—	—	—
(Italy) 2020 Antholz-Anterselva	—	6th	Gold	Bronze	Gold	—	Bronze
(Slovenia) 2021 Pokljuka	13th	Bronze	Gold	30th	4th	5th	—
(Germany) 2023 Oberhof	37th	36th	DNS	20th	Gold	Bronze	—
(Czech Republic) 2024 Nové Město	5th	9th	13th	11th	Bronze	—	—
(Switzerland) 2025 Lenzerheide	66th	47th	43rd	—	—	Gold	—

=== World Cup ===
World Cup rankings

Season	Overall		Individual		Sprint		Pursuit		Mass start	
Season	Points	Position	Points	Position	Points	Position	Points	Position	Points	Position
2017–18	113	46th	6	52nd	44	47th	57	36th	6	43rd
2018–19	352	24th	26	42nd	132	24th	128	22nd	66	24th
2019–20	726	5th	52	18th	274	7th	232	1st	170	6th
2020–21	812	7th	62	10th	258	10th	286	3rd	124	14th
2021–22	706	5th	37	19th	283	4th	244	4th	142	5th
2022–23	431	16th	13	49th	188	11th	158	15th	72	22nd
2023–24	712	6th	68	15th	229	12th	264	7th	151	5th
2024–25	777	7th	107	15th	325	3rd	231	7th	142	12th
2025–26	876	5th	133	3rd	283	7th	313	5th	147	7th

Individual podiums

- 5 victories (2 Pu, 1 MS, 2 Sp)
- 38 podiums

No.	Season	Date	Location	Discipline	Level	Place
1	2019–20	14 December 2019	(Austria) Hochfilzen	12.5 km Pursuit	World Cup	3rd
2	2019–20	22 December 2019	(France) Annecy	15 km Mass Start	World Cup	2nd
3	2019–20	10 January 2020	(Germany) Oberhof	10 km Sprint	World Cup	2nd
4	2019–20	16 February 2020	(Italy) Antholz	12.5 km Pursuit	World Championships	1st
5	2019–20	23 February 2020	(Italy) Antholz	15 km Mass Start	World Championships	3rd
6	2019–20	8 March 2020	(Czech Republic) Nové Město	15 km Mass Start	World Cup	2nd
7	2019–20	12 March 2020	(Finland) Kontiolahti	10 km Sprint	World Cup	3rd
8	2019–20	14 March 2020	(Finland) Kontiolahti	12.5 km Pursuit	World Cup	3rd
9	2020–21	12 December 2020	(Austria) Hochfilzen	12.5 km Pursuit	World Cup	2nd
10	2020–21	19 December 2020	(Austria) Hochfilzen	12.5 km Pursuit	World Cup	2nd
11	2020–21	12 February 2021	(Slovenia) Pokljuka	10 km Sprint	World Championships	3rd
12	2020–21	14 February 2021	(Slovenia) Pokljuka	12.5 km Pursuit	World Championships	1st
13	2020–21	13 March 2021	(Czech Republic) Nové Město	12.5 km Pursuit	World Cup	3rd
14	2021–22	2 December 2021	(Sweden) Östersund	10 km Sprint	World Cup	2nd
15	2021–22	5 December 2021	(Sweden) Östersund	12.5 km Pursuit	World Cup	3rd
16	2021–22	11 December 2021	(Austria) Hochfilzen	12.5 km Pursuit	World Cup	2nd
17	2021–22	19 December 2021	(France) Annecy	15 km Mass Start	World Cup	1st
18	2021–22	7 January 2022	(Germany) Oberhof	10 km Sprint	World Cup	2nd
19	2021–22	20 March 2022	(Norway) Oslo	15 km Mass Start	World Cup	3rd
20	2022–23	4 December 2022	(Finland) Kontiolahti	12.5 km Pursuit	World Cup	3rd
21	2022–23	9 December 2022	(Austria) Hochfilzen	10 km Sprint	World Cup	2nd
22	2022–23	11 December 2022	(Austria) Hochfilzen	12.5 km Pursuit	World Cup	3rd
23	2023–24	9 March 2024	(United States) Soldier Hollow	10 km Sprint	World Cup	2nd
24	2023–24	10 March 2024	(United States) Soldier Hollow	12.5 km Pursuit	World Cup	3rd
25	2023–24	17 March 2024	(Canada) Canmore	15 km Mass Start	World Cup	3rd
26	2024–25	6 December 2024	(Finland) Kontiolahti	10 km Sprint	World Cup	1st
27	2024–25	14 December 2024	(Austria) Hochfilzen	12.5 km Pursuit	World Cup	2nd
28	2024–25	21 December 2024	(France) Annecy	12.5 km Pursuit	World Cup	3rd
29	2024–25	10 January 2025	(Germany) Oberhof	10 km Sprint	World Cup	3rd
30	2024–25	6 March 2025	(Czech Republic) Nové Město	10 km Sprint	World Cup	1st
31	2025–26	19 December 2025	(France) Annecy	10 km Sprint	World Cup	3rd
32	2025–26	20 December 2025	(France) Annecy	12.5 km Pursuit	World Cup	2nd
33	2025–26	22 January 2026	(Czech Republic) Nové Město	15 km Short Individual	World Cup	2nd
34	2025–26	15 February 2026	(Italy) Antholz	12.5 km Pursuit	Olympic Games	3rd
35	2025–26	12 March 2026	(Estonia) Otepää	10 km Sprint	World Cup	2nd
36	2025–26	14 March 2026	(Estonia) Otepää	12.5 km Pursuit	World Cup	2nd
37	2025–26	20 March 2026	(Norway) Oslo	10 km Sprint	World Cup	2nd
38	2025–26	21 March 2026	(Norway) Oslo	12.5 km Pursuit	World Cup	3rd

*Results are from UIPMB and IBU races which include the Biathlon World Cup, Biathlon World Championships and Olympic Games.

Relay victories

10 victories

No.	Season	Date	Location	Discipline	Level	Team
1	2019–20	18 January 2020	(Germany) Ruhpolding	Relay	Biathlon World Cup	Jacquelin / Fourcade / Desthieux / Fillon Maillet
2	2019–20	25 January 2020	(Slovenia) Pokljuka	Single Mixed Relay	Biathlon World Cup	Jacquelin / Bescond
3	2019–20	22 February 2020	(Italy) Antholz-Anterselva	Relay	World Championships	Jacquelin / Fourcade / Desthieux / Fillon Maillet
4	2020–21	10 January 2021	(Germany) Oberhof	Single Mixed Relay	Biathlon World Cup	Simon / Jacquelin
5	2020–21	15 January 2021	(Germany) Oberhof	Relay	Biathlon World Cup	Desthieux / Fillon Maillet / Claude / Jacquelin
6	2020–21	23 January 2021	(Italy) Antholz-Anterselva	Relay	Biathlon World Cup	Guigonnat / Fillon Maillet / Desthieux / Jacquelin
7	2022–23	18 February 2023	(Germany) Oberhof	Relay	World Championships	Guigonnat / Claude / Jacquelin / Fillon Maillet
8	2023–24	25 November 2023	(Sweden) Östersund	Mixed Relay	Biathlon World Cup	Fillon Maillet / Jacquelin / Braisaz / Jeanmonnot
9	2024–25	1 December 2024	(Finland) Kontiolahti	Relay	Biathlon World Cup	Claude / Fillon Maillet / Perrot / Jacquelin
10	2024–25	15 December 2024	(Austria) Hochfilzen	Relay	Biathlon World Cup	Claude / Fillon Maillet / Perrot / Jacquelin

*Results are from IBU races which include the Biathlon World Cup, Biathlon World Championships and the Winter Olympic Games.
