= Kristo Siimer =

Estonian biathlete (born 1999)

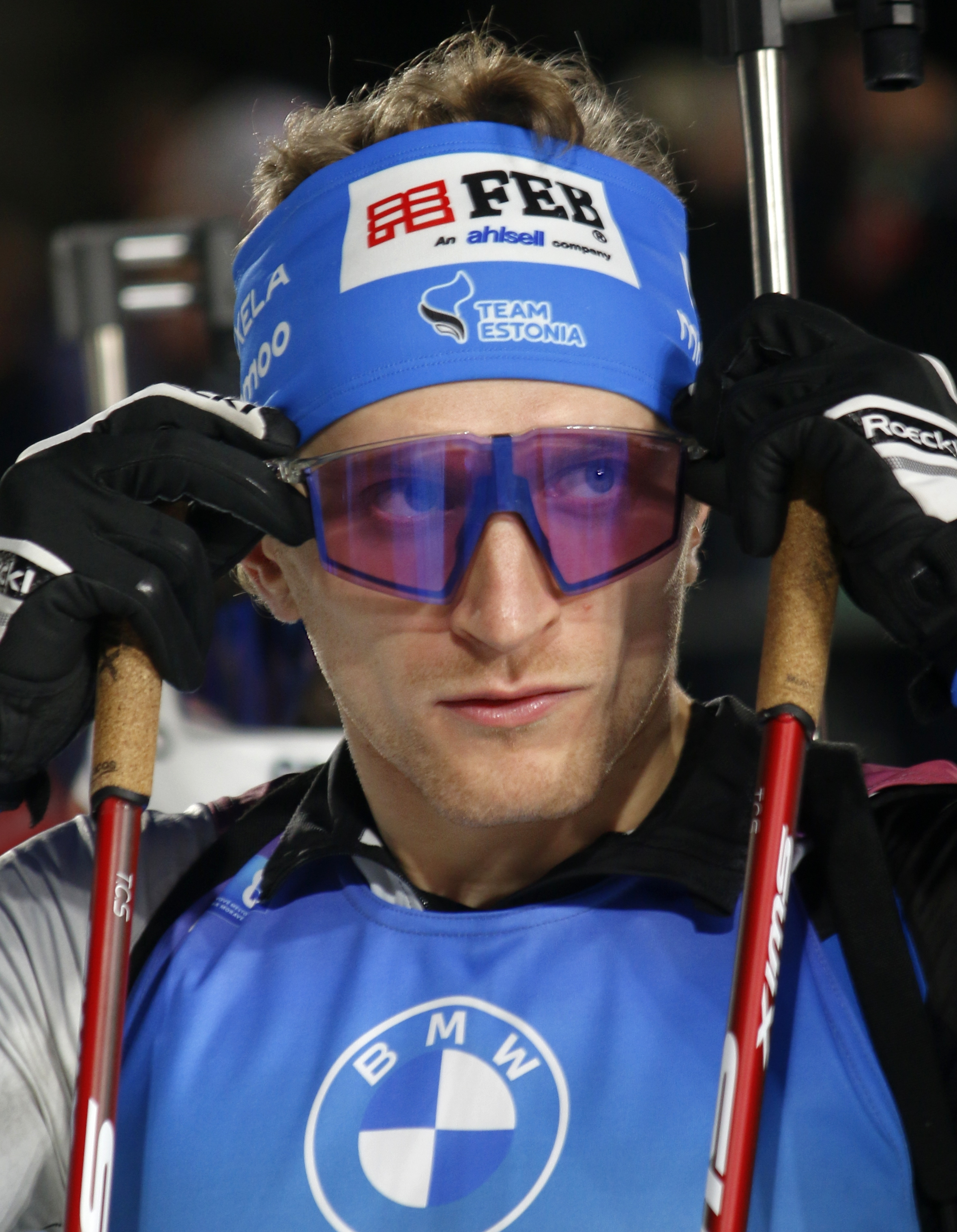
- Siimer in 2024

Personal information
- Nationality: Estonian
- Born: 14 May 1999 (age 27) Tallinn, Estonia

Sport
- Country: Estonia
- Sport: Biathlon

Kristo Siimer (born 14 May 1999) is an Estonian biathlete who has competed in the Biathlon World Cup since 2019.

He represented Estonia at the 2022 and 2026 Olympic Games. His best result to date is 14th place in the individual race at the 2024 Biathlon World Championships in Nové Město na Moravě.

== Biathlon results ==
All results are sourced from the International Biathlon Union.

=== Olympic Games ===
0 medal

Event	Individual	Sprint	Pursuit	Mass start	Relay	Mixed relay
(China) 2022 Beijing	60th	70th	—	—	15th	16th
(Italy) 2026 Milano Cortina	—	53rd	Q	—	—	15th

=== World Championships ===
0 medal

Event	Individual	Sprint	Pursuit	Mass start	Relay	Mixed relay	Single mixed relay
(Italy) 2020 Antholz-Anterselva	84th	—	—	—	21st	—	—
(Germany) 2023 Oberhof	57th	61st	—	—	15th	15th	—
(Czech Republic) 2024 Nove Mesto	14th	64th	—	—	17th	12th	—
(Switzerland) 2025 Lenzerheide	76th	39th	35th	—	11th	13th	—
