= Karol Dombrovski =

Lithuanian biathlete (born 1991)

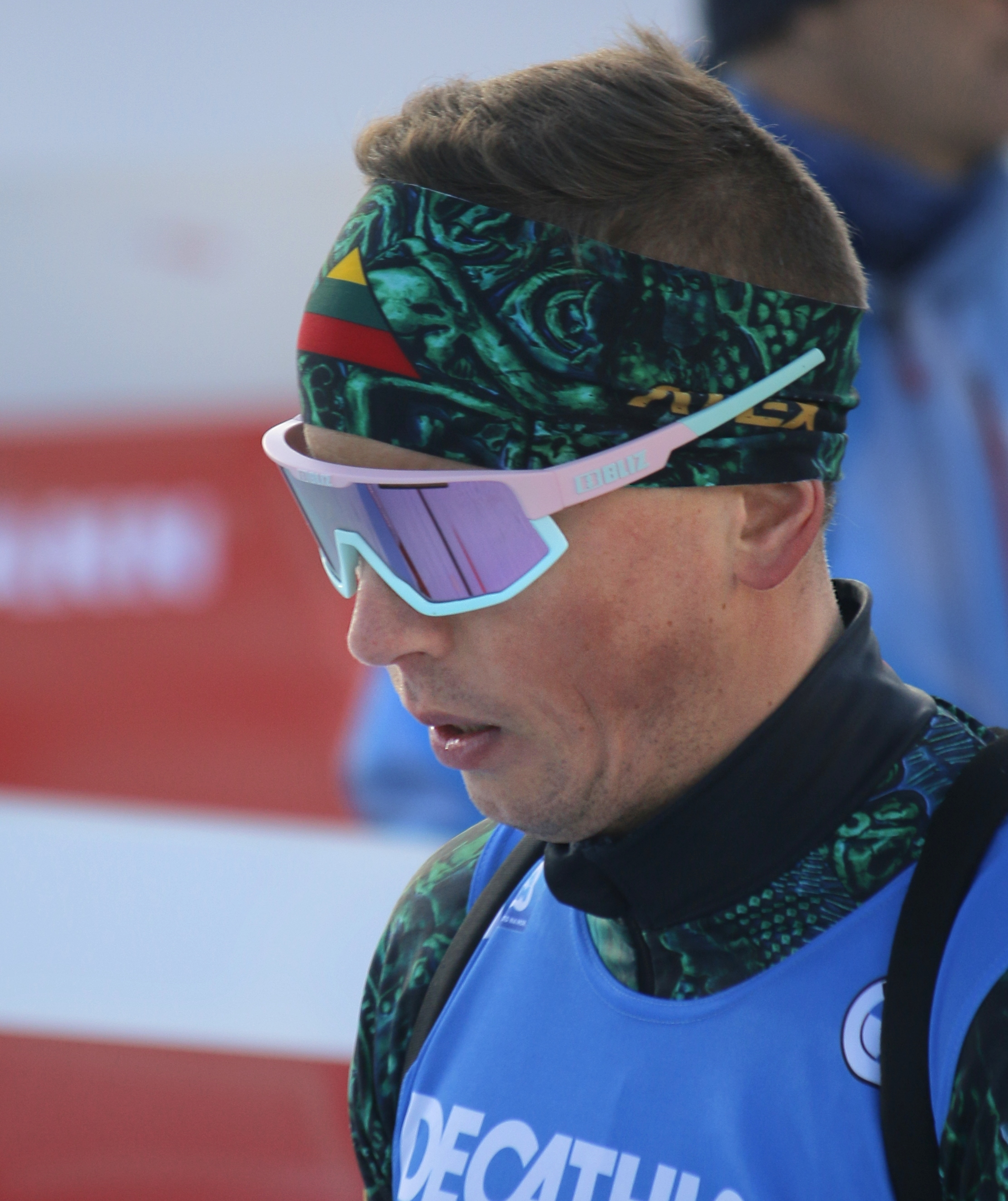
- Dombrovski in 2023

Personal information
- Born: 8 June 1991 (age 35) Vilnius, Lithuania

Sport

Professional information
- Sport: Biathlon
- Club: SK Nempolis
Medal record
Men's biathlon
Representing Lithuania

Karol Dombrovski (born 8 June 1991) is a Lithuanian former biathlete of Polish ethnicity who has competed at the Biathlon World Cup.

== Biathlon results ==
All results are sourced from the International Biathlon Union.

=== Olympic Games ===
0 medals

Event	Individual	Sprint	Relay
(China) 2022 Beijing	71st	73rd	14th
(Italy) 2026 Milan	30th	84th	15th

=== World Championships ===
0 medals

Event	Individual	Sprint	Pursuit	Mass start	Relay	Mixed relay	Single Mixed relay
(Russia) 2011 Khanty-Mansiysk	—N/a	65th	—N/a	—N/a	25th	—N/a	—N/a
(Germany) 2012 Ruhpolding	93rd	121st	—N/a	—N/a	21st	—N/a	—N/a
(Czech Republic) 2013 Nové Město na Moravě	81st	74th	—N/a	—N/a	25th	25th	—N/a
(Finland) 2015 Kontiolahti	93rd	68th	—N/a	—N/a	23rd	23rd	—N/a
(Norway) 2016 Oslo	52nd	95th	—N/a	—N/a	23rd	—N/a	—N/a
(Austria) 2017 Hochfilzen	66th	95th	—N/a	—N/a	25th	—N/a	—N/a
(Sweden) 2019 Östersund	51st	63rd	—N/a	—N/a	21st	24th	25th
(Italy) 2020 Antholz-Anterselva	30th	50th	48th	—N/a	24th	16th	24th
(Slovenia) 2021 Pokljuka	37th	39th	48th	—N/a	25th	17th	—N/a
(Germany) 2023 Oberhof	DNS	85th	-	-	16th	18th	-

*During Olympic seasons competitions are only held for those events not included in the Olympic program.
**The single mixed relay was added as an event in 2019.
