= 2024–25 Biathlon World Cup – Stage 1 =

2024–25 Biathlon World Cup Stage

The 2024–25 Biathlon World Cup – Stage 1 was the first event of the season and was held in Kontiolahti, Finland, from 27 November to 8 December 2024. The event consisted of three individual competitions and two relay races for both genders and two mixed relays. For the first time in history, a mass start race was held at the opening stage. To qualify for the mass start, participants needed to score the most points during the stage, while the remaining spots were filled according to the 2023/24 World Cup season rankings. World cup leaders after the events in Kontiolahti were Éric Perrot for men and Elvira Öberg for the women.

== Medal winners ==
=== Men ===
Event:	Gold:	Time	Silver:	Time	Bronze:	Time
15 km Short Individual	Endre Strømsheim; Norway	38:08.8 (0+0+0+0)	Johannes Thingnes Bø; Norway	38:11.8 (0+1+0+0)	Sturla Holm Lægreid; Norway	38:33.0 (0+0+0+0)
10 km Sprint	Émilien Jacquelin; France	23:03.1 (0+0)	Sebastian Samuelsson; Sweden	+18.9 (0+1)	Philipp Nawrath; Germany	+25.1 (0+0)
15 km Mass Start	Éric Perrot; France	37:12.9 (0+1+0+0)	Quentin Fillon Maillet; France	+9.1 (1+1+1+0)	Sturla Holm Lægreid; Norway	+11.5 (0+1+0+1)
4 x 7.5 km Men Relay	France; Fabien Claude; Quentin Fillon Maillet; Éric Perrot; Émilien Jacquelin	1:18:24.4 (0+0) (0+0) (0+0) (0+0) (0+0) (0+0) (0+0) (0+2)	Norway; Sturla Holm Lægreid; Tarjei Bø; Endre Strømsheim; Johannes Thingnes Bø	1:18:50.2 (0+0) (0+0) (0+1) (0+0) (0+0) (0+1) (0+1) (0+0)	Sweden; Viktor Brandt; Jesper Nelin; Martin Ponsiluoma; Sebastian Samuelsson	1:20:02.2 (0+1) (0+2) (0+1) (0+2) (0+2) (0+0) (0+0) (0+2)

=== Women ===
Event:	Gold:	Time	Silver:	Time	Bronze:	Time
12.5 km Short Individual	Lou Jeanmonnot; France	35:52.3 (0+0+0+0)	Ella Halvarsson; Sweden	36:04.6 (0+1+0+0)	Elvira Öberg; Sweden	36:48.7 (0+1+1+1)
7.5 km Sprint	Markéta Davidová; Czech Republic	20:39.7 (0+0)	Elvira Öberg; Sweden	20:48.5 (0+2)	Suvi Minkkinen; Finland	20:51.6 (0+0)
12.5 km Mass Start	Elvira Öberg; Sweden	35:58.6 (1+1+0+0)	Julia Simon; France	+16.2 (1+1+0+0)	Franziska Preuß; Germany	+19.1 (1+0+0+1)
4 x 5 km Women Relay	Sweden; Anna Magnusson; Sara Andersson; Hanna Öberg; Elvira Öberg	1:17:09.0 (0+0) (0+1) (0+0) (1+3) (0+0) (0+0) (0+2) (0+0)	France; Lou Jeanmonnot; Justine Braisaz-Bouchet; Sophie Chauveau; Julia Simon	1:17:38.0 (0+0) (0+0) (0+2) (0+3) (0+0) (0+1) (0+0) (1+3)	Norway; Juni Arnekleiv; Karoline Offigstad Knotten; Maren Kirkeeide; Ingrid Landmark Tandrevold	1:17:45.2 (0+0) (0+1) (1+3) (0+1) (0+1) (0+0) (0+0) (0+2)

=== Mixed ===
Event:	Gold:	Time	Silver:	Time	Bronze:	Time
Single Mixed Relay	Sweden; Ella Halvarsson; Sebastian Samuelsson	36:17.6 (0+0) (0+2) (0+0) (0+0) (0+0) (0+1) (0+1) (0+0)	France; Julia Simon; Quentin Fillon Maillet	36:27.8 (0+1) (0+0) (0+1) (0+0) (0+1) (0+1) (0+2) (0+3)	Germany; Vanessa Voigt; Justus Strelow	36:27.8 (0+2) (0+1) (0+0) (0+0) (0+0) (0+0) (0+1) (0+0)
Mixed Relay	Norway; Karoline Offigstad Knotten; Ingrid Landmark Tandrevold; Johannes Dale-Skjevdal; Vebjørn Sørum	1:09:59.6 (0+0) (0+0) (0+0) (0+1) (0+1) (0+3) (0+3) (0+2)	France; Lou Jeanmonnot; Justine Braisaz-Bouchet; Éric Perrot; Émilien Jacquelin	1:10:00.4 (0+0) (0+2) (0+0) (0+1) (0+0) (0+0) (0+0) (0+1)	Sweden; Anna Magnusson; Elvira Öberg; Jesper Nelin; Martin Ponsiluoma	1:10:21.1 (0+0) (0+1) (0+2) (0+0) (0+0) (0+1) (0+3) (0+0)

== Achievements ==
Best individual performance for all time

Men

- (Ukraine) Vitalii Mandzyn (21), reached No. 4 on short individual race
- (United States) Campbell Wright (22), reached No. 4 on sprint race
- (Germany) Danilo Riethmüller (25), reached No. 4 on mass start race
- (Belgium) Thierry Langer (33), reached No. 9 on short individual race
- (Czech Republic) Vítězslav Hornig (25), reached No. 15 on mass start race
- (United States) Maxime Germain (23), reached No. 20 on short individual race
- (Italy) Daniele Cappellari (27), reached No. 33 on sprint race
- (Finland) Arttu Heikkinen (20), reached No. 39 on sprint race
- (Finland) Jonni Mukkala (22), reached No. 42 on short individual race
- (Slovakia) Jakub Borguľa (20), reached No. 46 on short individual race
- (Belgium) César Beauvais (24), reached No. 51 on short individual race
- (Austria) Fredrik Mühlbacher (26), reached No. 62 on short individual race
- (Estonia) Mark-Markos Kehva (20), reached No. 76 on short individual race
- (Canada) Haldan Borglum (20), reached No. 92 on short individual race
- (Estonia) Yaroslav Neverov (19), reached No. 100 on sprint race

Women

- (Sweden) Ella Halvarsson (25), reached No. 2 on short individual race
- (Finland) Suvi Minkkinen (29), reached No. 3 on sprint race
- (Poland) Natalia Sidorowicz (26), reached No. 4 on short individual race
- (Germany) Julia Tannheimer (19), reached No. 5 on mass start race
- (France) Océane Michelon (22), reached No. 7 on short individual race
- (Sweden) Sara Andersson (21), reached No. 7 on sprint race
- (Estonia) Regina Ermits (28), reached No. 8 on short individual race
- (Sweden) Anna-Karin Heijdenberg (24), reached No. 14 on short individual race
- (Norway) Gro Randby (22), reached No. 16 on sprint race
- (Slovenia) Lena Repinc (21), reached No. 18 on short individual race
- (Belgium) Maya Cloetens (22), reached No. 23 on sprint race
- (Switzerland) Lea Meier (23), reached No. 23 on short individual race
- (Finland) Sonja Leinamo (22), reached No. 27 on sprint race
- (Czech Republic) Kristýna Otcovská (24), reached No. 32 on short individual race
- (Ukraine) Oleksandra Merkushyna (19), reached No. 33 on short individual race
- (Canada) Pascale Paradis (22), reached No. 34 on short individual race
- (Ukraine) Olena Horodna (20), reached No. 52 on sprint race
- (Latvia) Sandra Bulina (23), reached No. 56 on sprint race
- (Canada) Shilo Rousseau (24), reached No. 70 on sprint race
