= 2024–25 Biathlon World Cup – Stage 8 =

2024–25 Biathlon World Cup Stage

The 2024–25 Biathlon World Cup – Stage 8 was the eighth event of the season and will held in Pokljuka, Slovenia, from 10 to 16 March 2025. The event consisted of two individual competitions and two mixed relay races.

== Stage overview ==
Due to weather conditions, both short individual races were postponed to one day, March 13. Due to the weather circumstances, Dorothea Wierer, Sophie Chauveau, Erika Jänkä, Ema Kapustová, Lidija Žurauskaitė, Noora Kaisa Keränen, Shawna Pendry, and Darcie Morton missed the race.

Due to illness, the German athlete Philipp Horn will miss the Pokljuka stage. After participating in one race at the stage in Nové Město na Moravě, the leader of the Czech team, Marketa Davidova, will miss the stage in Pokljuka. Didier Bionaz ended his racing season prematurely, leaving the Italian men's team with only five biathletes for the stage in Pokljuka. The ill Anna Gandler is skipping this stage, and she will be replaced by Anna Andexer in the Austrian women's team. The Slovak Olympic and World Champion Anastasiya Kuzmina is skipping the stage.

Sweden's Elvira Öberg is returning after illness to compete in the mass start at the stage in Pokljuka. The 2024-25 IBU Cup winner, Norwegian Isak Frey, is making his World Cup debut at this stage. Additionally, Johannes Dale-Skjevdal is returning to the Norwegian national team.

== Schedule of events ==
The events took place at the following times.

Date	Time	Events
13 March	11:30 CET	Women's Short Individual
13 March	15:15 CET	Men's Short Individual
15 March	13:35 CET	Women's Mass Start
15 March	15:45 CET	Men's Mass Start
16 March	12:05 CET	Single Mixed Relay
16 March	14:50 CET	Mixed Relay

== Medal winners ==
=== Men ===
Event:	Gold:	Time	Silver:	Time	Bronze:	Time
15 km Short Individual details	Jakov Fak; Slovenia	40:52.6 (0+0+0+0)	Sturla Holm Lægreid; Norway	41:26.9 (0+0+0+1)	Martin Ponsiluoma; Sweden	41:36.9 (0+1+0+1)
15 km Mass Start details	Éric Perrot; France	35:42.7 (0+0+0+1)	Quentin Fillon Maillet; France	+3.1 (0+0+0+1)	Sturla Holm Lægreid; Norway	+22.3 (0+0+1+0)

=== Women ===
Event:	Gold:	Time	Silver:	Time	Bronze:	Time
12.5 km Short Individual details	Julia Simon; France	38:08.2 (0+0+0+0)	Hanna Öberg; Sweden	38:47.3 (0+0+0+1)	Franziska Preuß; Germany	38:54.4 (0+0+0+0)
12.5 km Mass Start details	Lou Jeanmonnot; France	39:41.8 (0+0+1+0)	Milena Todorova; Bulgaria	+16.4 (0+0+0+0)	Anamarija Lampič; Slovenia	+22.8 (0+0+0+1)

=== Mixed ===
Event:	Gold:	Time	Silver:	Time	Bronze:	Time
Single Mixed Relay details	Switzerland; Aita Gasparin; Niklas Hartweg	40:51.8 (0+1) (0+2) (0+0) (0+0) (0+0) (0+2) (0+0) (0+2)	Sweden; Johanna Skottheim; Jesper Nelin	41:01.2 (0+0) (0+1) (0+0) (0+0) (0+0) (0+0) (0+2) (0+1)	Finland; Suvi Minkkinen; Tero Seppälä	41:03.9 (0+1) (0+0) (0+2) (0+1) (0+1) (0+2) (0+2) (0+0)
Mixed Relay details	Sweden; Anna-Karin Heijdenberg; Hanna Öberg; Martin Ponsiluoma; Sebastian Samuelsson	1:09:07.5 (0+2) (0+0) (0+2) (0+2) (0+3) (0+2) (0+0) (0+1)	France; Jeanne Richard; Océane Michelon; Éric Perrot; Quentin Fillon Maillet	1:09:22.3 (0+0) (1+3) (0+0) (0+0) (0+0) (0+0) (0+3) (0+0)	Norway; Maren Kirkeeide; Ida Lien; Johannes Dale-Skjevdal; Isak Frey	1:09:27.5 (0+0) (0+1) (0+1) (0+2) (0+2) (0+2) (0+0) (0+2)

== Achievements ==
Best individual performance for all time

Men

- (Norway) Isak Frey (21) reached No. 11 on mass start race
- (Czech Republic) Adam Václavík (31) reached No. 14 on short individual race
- (Poland) Fabian Suchodolski (20) reached No. 23 on short individual race
- (Italy) Daniele Cappellari (27) reached No. 24 on short individual race
- (Lithuania) Nikita Čigak (22) reached No. 57 on short individual race
- (Bulgaria) Vasil Zashev (22) reached No. 61 on short individual race
- (Estonia) Yaroslav Neverov (20) reached No. 93 on short individual race

Women

- (Bulgaria) Milena Todorova (27) reached No. 2 on mass start race
- (Sweden) Anna-Karin Heijdenberg (24) reached No. 4 on short individual race
- (Ukraine) Olena Horodna (20) reached No. 13 on short individual race
- (Italy) Linda Zingerle (22) reached No. 55 on short individual race

First World Cup individual race

Men

- (Norway) Isak Frey (21) reached No. 17 on short individual race

Women
