= 2023–24 Biathlon World Cup – Stage 2 =

2023–24 Biathlon World Cup Stage

The 2023–24 Biathlon World Cup – Stage 2 was the second event of the season and was held in Hochfilzen, Austria, from 8 to 10 December 2023.

== Schedule of events ==
The events took place at the following times.

Date	Time	Events
8 December	13:30 CET	Men's 10 km Sprint
8 December	16:25 CET	Women's 7.5 km Sprint
9 December	14:15 CET	Men's 12.5 km Pursuit
9 December	16:45 CET	Women's 10 km Pursuit
10 December	13:30 CET	4 x 7.5 km Men's Relay
10 December	16:15 CET	4 x 6 km Women's Relay

== Medal winners ==
=== Men ===
Event:	Gold:	Time	Silver:	Time	Bronze:	Time
10 km Sprint	Tarjei Bø; Norway	24:37.5 (0+0)	Sturla Holm Lægreid; Norway	24:42.4 (0+0)	Sebastian Samuelsson; Sweden	24:47.5 (1+0)
12.5 km Pursuit	Johannes Thingnes Bø; Norway	33:05.1 (1+0+0+0)	Johannes Dale-Skjevdal; Norway	+22.6 (2+0+1+0)	Tarjei Bø; Norway	+28.4 (1+0+1+0)
4 x 7,5 km Men Relay	Norway; Sturla Holm Lægreid; Tarjei Bø; Johannes Thingnes Bø; Vetle Sjåstad Christiansen	1:15:38.5 (0+0) (0+1) (0+0) (0+1) (0+2) (0+1) (0+0) (0+0)	France; Éric Perrot; Émilien Jacquelin; Fabien Claude; Quentin Fillon Maillet	1:16:07.2 (0+0) (0+0) (0+1) (0+1) (0+0) (0+3) (0+1) (0+0)	Germany; David Zobel; Johannes Kühn; Philipp Nawrath; Benedikt Doll	1:16:45.4 (0+1) (1+3) (0+0) (0+2) (0+1) (0+0) (0+2) (0+0)

=== Women ===
Event:	Gold:	Time	Silver:	Time	Bronze:	Time
7.5 km Sprint	Ingrid Landmark Tandrevold; Norway	20:59.9 (0+0)	Elvira Öberg; Sweden	21:04.8 (1+0)	Justine Braisaz-Bouchet; France	21:19.6 (1+0)
10 km Pursuit	Elvira Öberg; Sweden	29:44.6 (1+0+0+0)	Lena Häcki-Groß; Switzerland	+11.2 (0+0+1+0)	Ingrid Landmark Tandrevold; Norway	+13.9 (1+0+0+0)
4 x 6 km Women Relay	Norway; Juni Arnekleiv; Marit Ishol Skogan; Karoline Offigstad Knotten; Ingrid Landmark Tandrevold	1:07:39.0 (0+0) (0+2) (0+0) (0+1) (0+1) (0+1) (0+0) (0+1)	Sweden; Anna Magnusson; Mona Brorsson; Hanna Öberg; Elvira Öberg	1:08:10.6 (0+1) (0+1) (0+2) (0+2) (0+1) (0+2) (0+1) (0+0)	France; Gilonne Guigonnat; Lou Jeanmonnot; Justine Braisaz-Bouchet; Julia Simon	1:08:40.5 (0+0) (0+1) (0+1) (1+3) (0+1) (0+0) (0+0) (0+2)

== Achievements ==
Best individual performance for all time

Men
Place	Name	Race
36	(Finland) Jaakko Ranta	Pursuit
38	(Latvia) Renars Birkentals	Sprint
38	(Italy) Elia Zeni	Pursuit
47	(Poland) Marcin Zawol	Pursuit
61	(Poland) Konrad Badacz	Sprint
68	(Finland) Jonni Mukkala	Sprint
89	(Lithuania) Jokubas Mackine	Sprint
91	(Slovakia) Damian Cesnek	Sprint
95	(Greece) Nikolaos Tsourekas	Sprint
Debut
89	(Lithuania) Jokubas Mackine	Sprint

Women
Place	Name	Race
2	(Switzerland) Lena Häcki-Groß	Pursuit
13	(Austria) Anna Juppe	Sprint
24	(Bulgaria) Valentina Dimitrova	Sprint
30	(Italy) Beatrice Trabucchi	Pursuit
32	(Poland) Natalia Sidorowicz	Pursuit
50	(Switzerland) Flurina Volken	Sprint
55	(Slovakia) Ema Kapustova	Pursuit
61	(Poland) Daria Gembicka	Sprint
62	(Croatia) Anika Kozica	Sprint
68	(Ukraine) Olena Horodna	Sprint
71	(Lithuania) Lidiia Zhurauskaite	Sprint
72	(Kazakhstan) Polina Yegorova	Sprint
79	(Estonia) Hanna-Brita Kaasik	Sprint
86	(United States) Grace Castonguay	Sprint
Debut
71	(Lithuania) Lidiia Zhurauskaite	Sprint
