= Biathlon World Championships 2025 – Women's mass start =

Women's mass start at the Biathlon World Championships 2025
- Venue: Roland Arena
- Location: Lenzerheide, Switzerland
- Dates: 23 February
- Competitors: 30 from 14 nations
- Winning time: 40:32.3

Medalists
gold medal	Elvira Öberg	Sweden
silver medal	Océane Michelon	France
bronze medal	Maren Kirkeeide	Norway

The Women's mass start competition at the Biathlon World Championships 2025 was held on 23 February 2025.

== Results ==
The race was started at 13:45.

Rank	Bib	Name	Nationality	Penalties (P+S)	Time	Deficit
1st place, gold medalist(s)	4	Elvira Öberg	Sweden	2 (1+1+0+0)	40:32.3	
2nd place, silver medalist(s)	9	Océane Michelon	France	3 (1+1+1+0)	40:41.7	+9.4
3rd place, bronze medalist(s)	11	Maren Kirkeeide	Norway	3 (2+0+1+0)	40:48.8	+16.5
4	8	Jeanne Richard	France	3 (0+1+2+0)	40:55.4	+23.1
5	21	Milena Todorova	Bulgaria	2 (1+0+1+0)	40:56.6	+24.3
6	7	Lou Jeanmonnot	France	4 (3+0+0+1)	41:06.4	+34.1
7	2	Franziska Preuß	Germany	1 (0+0+0+1)	41:08.4	+36.1
8	6	Suvi Minkkinen	Finland	2 (1+1+0+0)	41:15.7	+43.4
9	18	Tuuli Tomingas	Estonia	2 (1+0+0+1)	41:27.6	+55.3
10	1	Justine Braisaz-Bouchet	France	7 (2+1+1+3)	41:36.4	+1:04.1
11	28	Aita Gasparin	Switzerland	2 (2+0+0+0)	41:40.7	+1:08.4
12	12	Lisa Theresa Hauser	Austria	4 (2+1+0+1)	41:41.5	+1:09.2
13	15	Michela Carrara	Italy	5 (3+1+1+0)	41:43.0	+1:10.7
14	19	Maya Cloetens	Belgium	0 (0+0+0+0)	41:52.4	+1:20.1
15	23	Julia Tannheimer	Germany	3 (1+1+0+1)	41:53.1	+1:20.8
16	29	Anamarija Lampič	Slovenia	6 (2+0+1+3)	41:53.2	+1:20.9
17	5	Ella Halvarsson	Sweden	2 (1+0+0+1)	41:53.9	+1:21.6
18	13	Lotte Lie	Belgium	0 (0+0+0+0)	42:00.9	+1:28.6
19	17	Anna Magnusson	Sweden	2 (1+1+0+0)	42:20.7	+1:48.4
20	26	Ingrid Landmark Tandrevold	Norway	6 (2+0+2+2)	42:20.9	+1:48.6
21	14	Lena Häcki-Groß	Switzerland	5 (0+1+2+2)	42:44.7	+2:12.4
22	3	Julia Simon	France	6 (2+2+1+1)	43:05.3	+2:33.0
23	25	Natalia Sidorowicz	Poland	4 (2+0+0+2)	43:09.0	+2:36.7
24	16	Yuliia Dzhima	Ukraine	1 (0+1+0+0)	43:10.7	+2:38.4
25	30	Polona Klemenčič	Slovenia	4 (1+0+1+2)	43:15.6	++2:43.3
26	22	Lora Hristova	Bulgaria	4 (0+1+1+2)	43:17.8	+2:45.5
27	10	Selina Grotian	Germany	6 (1+1+3+1)	43:29.8	+2:57.5
28	24	Sophia Schneider	Germany	6 (3+1+0+2)	43:40.9	+3:08.6
29	27	Khrystyna Dmytrenko	Ukraine	4 (1+2+0+1)	44:55.1	+4:22.8
30	20	Hanna Öberg	Sweden	9 (3+2+2+2)	46:25.1	+5:52.8
