= Biathlon World Championships 2023 – Men's mass start =

Men's mass start at the Biathlon World Championships 2023
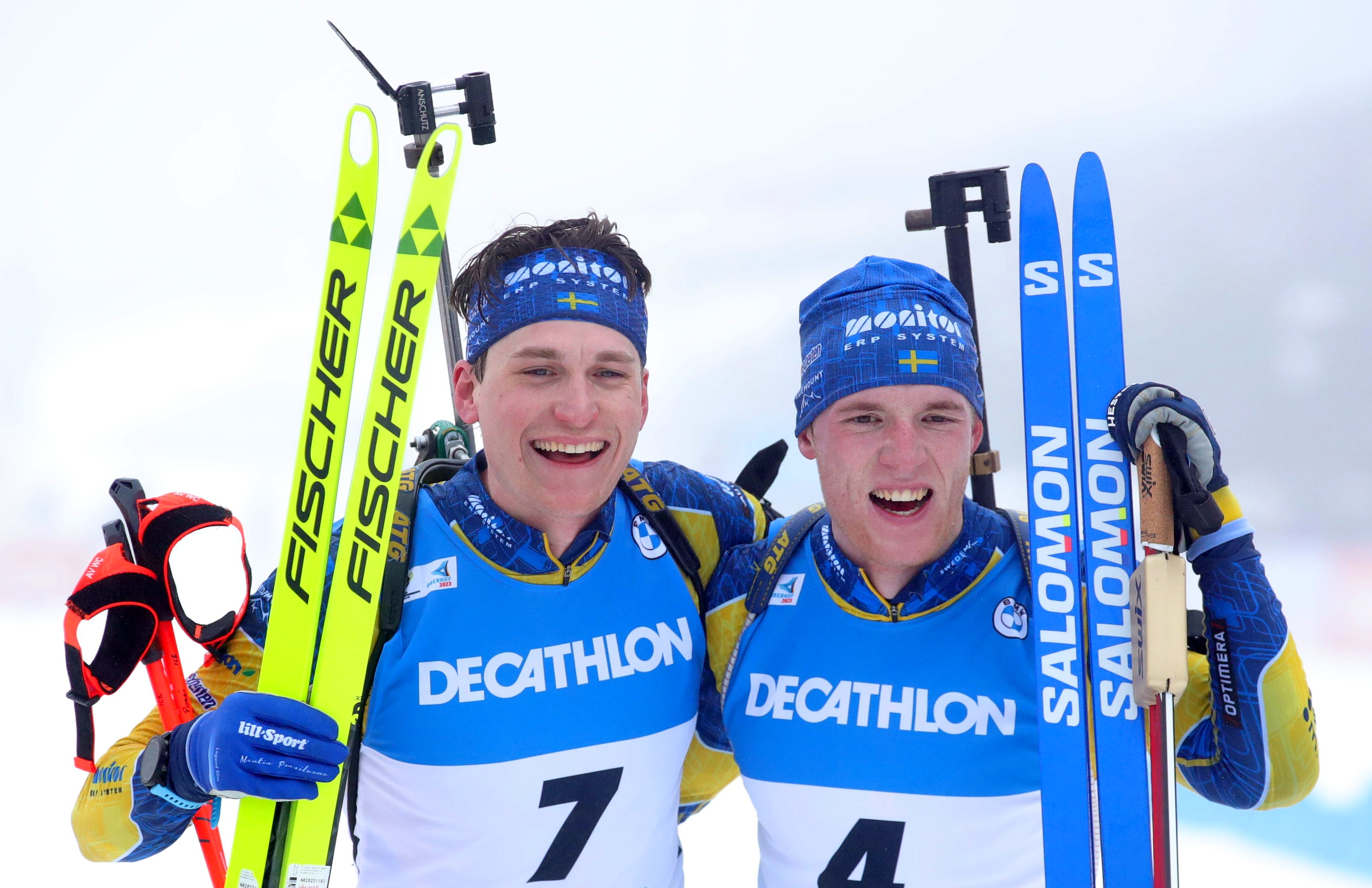
- Location: Oberhof, Germany
- Dates: 19 February
- Competitors: 30 from 13 nations
- Winning time: 36:42.8

Medalists
gold medal	Sebastian Samuelsson	Sweden
silver medal	Martin Ponsiluoma	Sweden
bronze medal	Johannes Thingnes Bø	Norway

The men's 15 km mass start competition at the Biathlon World Championships 2023 was held on 19 February 2023.

== Results ==
The race was started at 12:30.

Rank	Bib	Name	Nationality	Penalties (P+P+S+S)	Time	Deficit
1st place, gold medalist(s)	4	Sebastian Samuelsson	Sweden	0 (0+0+0+0)	36:42.8	—
2nd place, silver medalist(s)	7	Martin Ponsiluoma	Sweden	2 (0+1+1+0)	36:52.4	+9.6
3rd place, bronze medalist(s)	1	Johannes Thingnes Bø	Norway	3 (1+1+0+1)	37:21.6	+38.8
4	2	Sturla Holm Lægreid	Norway	2 (0+1+0+1)	37:38.6	+55.8
5	19	Andrejs Rastorgujevs	Latvia	3 (0+0+2+1)	37:50.1	+1:07.3
6	6	Quentin Fillon Maillet	France	2 (0+1+1+0)	37:53.7	+1:10.9
7	30	Sebastian Stalder	Switzerland	0 (0+0+0+0)	37:53.9	+1:11.1
8	12	Fabien Claude	France	2 (0+0+1+1)	38:09.2	+1:26.4
9	3	Tarjei Bø	Norway	4 (1+1+0+2)	38:14.0	+1:31.2
10	25	Tero Seppala	Finland	2 (1+1+0+0)	38:14.1	+1:31.3
11	8	Johannes Dale	Norway	2 (1+0+0+1)	38:15.1	+1:32.3
12	5	Vetle Sjåstad Christiansen	Norway	5 (1+1+1+2)	38:28.4	+1:45.6
13	15	Justus Strelow	Germany	1 (0+0+0+1)	38:28.8	+1:46.0
14	26	Tomáš Mikyska	Czech Republic	1 (1+0+0+0)	38:29.0	+1:46.2
15	18	Endre Strømsheim	Norway	3 (1+1+1+0)	38:41.5	+1:58.7
16	27	Jesper Nelin	Sweden	3 (0+1+1+1)	38:43.5	+2:00.7
17	28	Alex Cisar	Slovenia	1 (0+1+0+0)	38:46.2	+2:03.4
18	10	Roman Rees	Germany	2 (0+1+0+1)	38:50.4	+2:07.6
19	22	Antonin Guigonnat	France	5 (1+0+2+2)	39:17.4	+2:34.6
20	11	Émilien Jacquelin	France	5 (1+0+2+2)	39:17.5	+2:34.7
21	17	Johannes Kühn	Germany	5 (0+1+3+1)	39:30.6	+2:47.8
22	23	Jakub Štvrtecký	Czech Republic	6 (1+1+2+2)	39:40.7	+2:57.9
23	16	Dmytro Pidruchnyi	Ukraine	4 (0+1+3+0)	39:48.5	+3:05.7
24	20	David Komatz	Austria	4 (1+1+1+1)	39:51.2	+3:08.4
25	24	Anton Dudchenko	Ukraine	3 (0+2+1+0)	39:53.4	+3:10.6
26	9	Benedikt Doll	Germany	6 (2+0+2+2)	40:15.8	+3:33.0
27	14	Michal Krčmář	Czech Republic	7 (1+2+2+2)	40:48.9	+4:06.1
28	13	Tommaso Giacomel	Italy	7 (2+3+1+1)	41:05.0	+4:22.2
29	21	Vladimir Iliev	Bulgaria	8 (3+2+1+2)	41:26.4	+4:43.6
30	29	Peppe Femling	Sweden	7 (1+2+4+0)	42:31.1	+5:48.3
