= Biathlon World Championships 2024 – Mixed relay =

Mixed relay at the Biathlon World Championships 2024
- Venue: Vysočina Arena
- Location: Nové Město na Moravě, Czech Republic
- Dates: 7 February
- Competitors: 100 from 25 nations
- Teams: 25
- Winning time: 1:09:24.4

Medalists
| gold medal | Éric Perrot; Quentin Fillon Maillet; Justine Braisaz-Bouchet; Julia Simon | France |
| silver medal | Tarjei Bø; Johannes Thingnes Bø; Karoline Offigstad Knotten; Ingrid Landmark Tandrevold | Norway |
| bronze medal | Sebastian Samuelsson; Martin Ponsiluoma; Hanna Öberg; Elvira Öberg | Sweden |

The Mixed relay competition at the Biathlon World Championships 2024 was held on 7 February 2024.

Team Norway was the four-time defending champion but they did not defend their title, finishing the competition in 2nd place.

Team France became the new world champion and ended Team Norway's winning streak by winning their first gold medal since 2016. The bronze medal was won by team Sweden.

== Results ==
The race was started at 17:20.

| Rank | Bib | Team | Time | Penalties (P+S) | Deficit |
|---|---|---|---|---|---|
| 1st place, gold medalist(s) | 2 | France; 1. Éric Perrot; 2. Quentin Fillon Maillet; 3. Justine Braisaz-Bouchet; 4. Julia Simon | 1:09:24.4; 15:42.9; 16:18.2; 19:14.6; 18:08.7 | 1+7 0+2; 0+3 0+0; 0+1 0+1; 1+3 0+1; 0+0 0+0 | |
| 2nd place, silver medalist(s) | 1 | Norway; 1. Tarjei Bø; 2. Johannes Thingnes Bø; 3. Karoline Offigstad Knotten; 4. Ingrid Landmark Tandrevold | 1:10:09.6; 15:59.6; 16:22.0; 19:02.1; 18:45.9 | 0+2 0+6; 0+0 0+2; 0+1 0+3; 0+0 0+0; 0+1 0+1 | +45.2 |
| 3rd place, bronze medalist(s) | 4 | Sweden; 1. Sebastian Samuelsson; 2. Martin Ponsiluoma; 3. Hanna Öberg; 4. Elvira Öberg | 1:10:26.1; 16:30.3; 16:12.5; 18:55.7; 18:47.6 | 0+5 0+5; 0+2 0+3; 0+1 0+0; 0+2 0+0; 0+0 0+2 | +1:01.7 |
| 4 | 5 | Switzerland; 1. Sebastian Stalder; 2. Niklas Hartweg; 3. Lena Häcki-Groß; 4. Amy Baserga | 1:10:27.3; 16:00.0; 16:41.4; 18:40.7; 19:05.2 | 0+1 0+2; 0+0 0+0; 0+1 0+0; 0+0 0+2; 0+0 0+0 | +1:02.9 |
| 5 | 7 | Germany; 1. Justus Strelow; 2. Philipp Nawrath; 3. Franziska Preuß; 4. Vanessa Voigt | 1:10:55.3; 15:43.8; 16:09.0; 20:00.3; 19:02.2 | 0+3 1+6; 0+0 0+0; 0+0 0+3; 0+3 1+3; 0+0 0+0 | +1:30.9 |
| 6 | 8 | Austria; 1. David Komatz; 2. Simon Eder; 3. Tamara Steiner; 4. Anna Gandler | 1:11:54.9; 16:30.6; 16:41.6; 19:41.6; 19:01.1 | 0+3 0+1; 0+1 0+0; 0+0 0+2; 0+2 0+0; 0+0 0+0 | +2:30.5 |
| 7 | 9 | Ukraine; 1. Artem Pryma; 2. Dmytro Pidruchnyi; 3. Yuliia Dzhima; 4. Iryna Petrenko | 1:12:13.3; 16:31.3; 16:51.4; 19:25.8; 19:24.7 | 0+3 0+5; 0+2 0+2; 0+0 0+1; 0+1 0+1; 0+0 0+1 | +2:48.8 |
| 8 | 10 | Belgium; 1. Florent Claude; 2. Thierry Langer; 3. Lotte Lie; 4. Maya Cloetens | 1:12:34.4; 16:38.4; 16:34.8; 19:32.7; 19:48.5 | 0+1 0+2; 0+1 0+2; 0+0 0+1; 0+0 0+0; 0+0 0+0 | +3:10.0 |
| 9 | 11 | Slovenia; 1. Miha Dovžan; 2. Jakov Fak; 3. Polona Klemenčič; 4. Anamarija Lampič | 1:12:46.6; 17:21.9; 16:36.2; 20:00.1; 18:48.4 | 0+3 1+8; 0+1 1+3; 0+0 0+1; 0+2 0+1; 0+0 0+3 | +3:22.2 |
| 10 | 3 | Italy; 1. Didier Bionaz; 2. Tommaso Giacomel; 3. Dorothea Wierer; 4. Lisa Vittozzi | 1:13:27.2; 17:49.1; 17:09.3; 19:25.9; 19:02.9 | 1+7 2+8; 0+3 2+3; 1+3 0+1; 0+1 0+1; 0+0 0+3 | +4:02.8 |
| 11 | 17 | United States; 1. Vincent Bonacci; 2. Sean Doherty; 3. Deedra Irwin; 4. Chloe Levins | 1:13:36.3; 16:28.4; 16:58.7; 19:32.0; 20:37.2 | 0+3 0+3; 0+0 0+2; 0+2 0+1; 0+1 0+0; 0+0 0+0 | +4:11.9 |
| 12 | 13 | Estonia; 1. Rene Zahkna; 2. Kristo Siimer; 3. Tuuli Tomingas; 4. Regina Ermits | 1:14:05.7; 17:11.6; 17:17.5; 20:05.0; 19:31.6 | 0+5 0+6; 0+1 0+2; 0+1 0+1; 0+2 0+2; 0+1 0+1 | +4:41.3 |
| 13 | 16 | Canada; 1. Adam Runnalls; 2. Christian Gow; 3. Nadia Moser; 4. Emma Lunder | 1:14:07.2; 16:41.0; 16:48.1; 20:29.0; 20:09.1 | 0+4 0+7; 0+2 0+3; 0+0 0+0; 0+1 0+2; 0+1 0+2 | +4:42.8 |
| 14 | 6 | Czech Republic; 1. Michal Krčmář; 2. Tomáš Mikyska; 3. Markéta Davidová; 4. Jessica Jislová | 1:14:12.2; 17:44.7; 17:03.1; 19:37.9; 19:46.5 | 1+5 0+8; 1+3 0+2; 0+0 0+1; 0+2 0+2; 0+0 0+3 | +4:47.8 |
| 15 | 15 | Poland; 1. Jan Guńka; 2. Andrzej Nędza-Kubiniec; 3. Anna Mąka; 4. Joanna Jakieła | 1:14:25.7; 17:12.7; 17:24.6; 19:50.5; 19:57.9 | 0+4 0+3; 0+1 0+1; 0+0 0+1; 0+2 0+0; 0+1 0+1 | +5:01.3 |
| 16 | 24 | Slovakia; 1. Tomáš Sklenárik; 2. Damian Cesnek; 3. Anastasiya Kuzmina; 4. Maria Remenova | 1:15:47.9; 16:45.7; 18:43.3; 20:05.1; 20:13.8 | 2+7 0+6; 0+1 0+3; 1+3 0+1; 1+3 0+1; 0+0 0+1 | +6:23.5 |
| 17 | 18 | Lithuania; 1. Maksim Fomin; 2. Vytautas Strolia; 3. Lidiia Zhurauskaite; 4. Natalija Kočergina | 1:16:01.0; 17:22.8; 17:05.5; 20:21.2; 21:11.5 | 0+3 0+9; 0+0 0+2; 0+1 0+2; 0+0 0+2; 0+2 0+3 | +6:36.6 |
| 18 | 21 | Moldova; 1. Mihail Usov; 2. Pavel Magazeev; 3. Alla Ghilenko; 4. Aliona Makarova | 1:16:08.3; 17:23.7; 17:10.2; 20:33.2; 21:01.2 | 0+5 0+6; 0+0 0+2; 0+2 0+1; 0+0 0+2; 0+3 0+1 | +6:43.9 |
| 19 | 20 | Latvia; 1. Renārs Birkentāls; 2. Edgars Mise; 3. Baiba Bendika; 4. Annija Sabule | 1:16:32.2; 17:09.8; 17:19.8; 19:46.1; 22:16.5 | 0+6 1+6; 0+2 0+1; 0+2 0+0; 0+1 1+3; 0+1 0+2 | +7:07.8 |
| 20 | 12 | Finland; 1. Tuomas Harjula; 2. Otto Invenius; 3. Venla Lehtonen; 4. Suvi Minkkinen | 1:16:41.5; 17:12.2; 17:27.9; 21:35.5; 20:25.9 | 0+7 1+6; 0+2 0+2; 0+1 1+3; 0+3 0+0; 0+1 0+1 | +7:17.1 |
| 21 | 19 | Kazakhstan; 1. Alexandr Mukhin; 2. Vladislav Kireyev; 3. Galina Vishnevskaya-Sheporenko; 4. Polina Yegorova | 1:17:02.4; 16:08.5; 18:12.1; 21:13.5; 21:28.3 | 0+4 0+5; 0+0 0+0; 0+2 0+1; 0+1 0+1; 0+1 0+3 | +7:38.0 |
| 22 | 14 | Bulgaria; 1. Blagoy Todev; 2. Vladimir Iliev; 3. Valentina Dimitrova; 4. Lora Hristova | 1:18:46.0; 17:51.1; 17:52.9; 20:38.2; 22:23.8 | 0+2 5+12; 0+2 1+3; 0+0 2+3; 0+0 0+3; 0+0 2+3 | +9:21.6 |
| 23 | 22 | Romania; 1. George Buta; 2. Dmitrii Shamaev; 3. Anastasia Tolmacheva; 4. Andreea Mezdrea | LAP; 17:46.0; 18:02.9 | 0+0 0+4; 0+0 0+2; 0+0 0+0; 0+0 0+2 | |
| 24 | 25 | Japan; 1. Mikito Tachizaki; 2. Kiyomasa Ojima; 3. Aoi Sato; 4. Hikaru Fukuda | LAP; 17:44.4; 18:06.7 | 1+6 0+4; 0+3 0+0; 0+0 0+1; 1+3 0+3 | |
| 25 | 23 | South Korea; 1. Choi Du-jin; 2. Timofey Lapshin; 3. Ekaterina Avvakumova; 4. Ko Eun-jung | LAP; 19:11.9; 17:28.8 | 2+8 0+2; 1+3 0+1; 0+2 0+0; 1+3 0+1 | |
