= Elvira Öberg =

Swedish biathlete (born 1999)

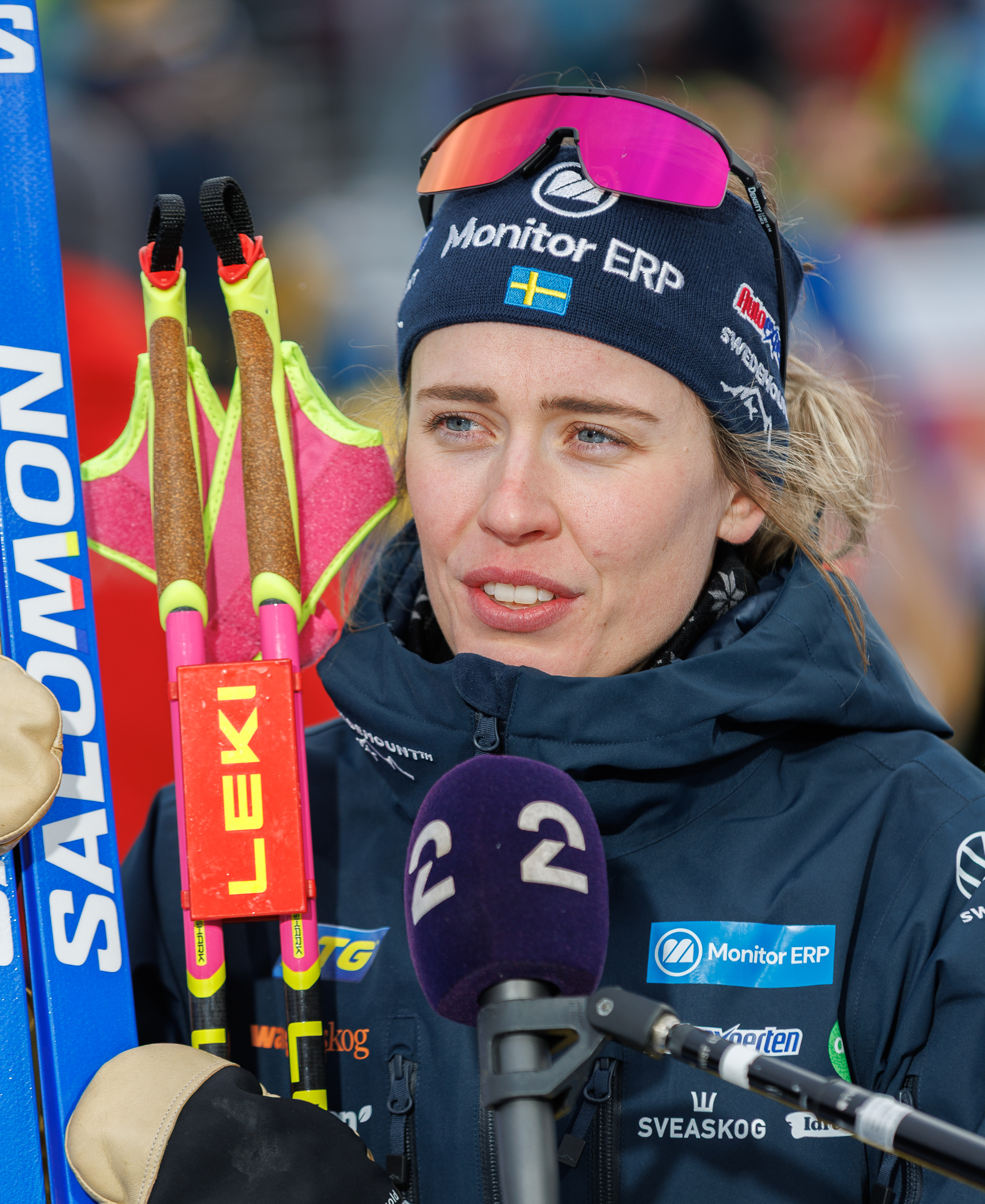
- Öberg in 2025

Personal information
- Full name: Elvira Karin Öberg
- Nationality: Swedish
- Born: 26 February 1999 (age 27) Kiruna, Sweden
- Height: 1.76 m (5 ft 9 in)
- Weight: 68 kg (150 lb)

Sport

Professional information
- Sport: Biathlon
- World Cup debut: 1 December 2019

Olympic Games
- Teams: 1 (2022)
- Medals: 4 (1 gold)

World Championships
- Teams: 5 (2020–2025)
- Medals: 6 (1 gold)

World Cup
- Seasons: 7 (2019–20–)
- All races: 177
- Individual victories: 10
- All victories: 16
- Individual podiums: 29
- All podiums: 53
Medal record
Women's biathlon
Representing Sweden
International biathlon competitions
Event	1st	2nd	3rd
Olympic Games	1	3	0
World Championships	1	2	3
Total	2	5	3
Olympic Games
Gold medal – first place	2022 Beijing	4 × 6 km relay
Silver medal – second place	2022 Beijing	7.5 km sprint
Silver medal – second place	2022 Beijing	10 km pursuit
Silver medal – second place	2026 Milano Cortina	4 × 6 km relay
World Championships
Gold medal – first place	2025 Lenzerheide	12.5 km mass start
Silver medal – second place	2024 Nové Město	4 × 6 km relay
Silver medal – second place	2025 Lenzerheide	10 km pursuit
Bronze medal – third place	2023 Oberhof	4 x 6 km relay
Bronze medal – third place	2024 Nové Město	Mixed relay
Bronze medal – third place	2025 Lenzerheide	4 × 6 km relay
Youth World Championships
Gold medal – first place	2018 Otepää	10 km individual
Gold medal – first place	2018 Otepää	6 km sprint
Gold medal – first place	2018 Otepää	3 × 6 km relay
Bronze medal – third place	2017 Osrblie	10 km individual
Bronze medal – third place	2019 Osrblie	3 × 6 km relay
- Updated on 9 December 2025

Elvira Karin Öberg (born 26 February 1999) is a Swedish biathlete. She is the younger sister of Olympic champion Hanna Öberg. Elvira won three gold medals in the youth category at the 2018 Biathlon Junior World Championships in Otepää; in the ten km individual, the 3 × 6 km relay and the 6 km sprint respectively. Öberg placed twelfth in the sprint in her Biathlon World Cup debut in Östersund, 1 December 2019. At the Olympic Games in Beijing in 2022 she won the silver medal in the sprint race, following up with a silver in the pursuit.

== Biathlon results ==
All results are sourced from the International Biathlon Union.

=== Olympic Games ===
4 medals (1 gold, 3 silver)

Event	Individual	Sprint	Pursuit	Mass start	Relay	Mixed relay
(China) 2022 Beijing	13th	Silver	Silver	9th	Gold	4th
(Italy) 2026 Milano Cortina	13th	27th	23rd	6th	Silver	–

=== World Championships ===
6 medals (1 gold, 2 silver, 3 bronze)

Event	Individual	Sprint	Pursuit	Mass start	Relay	Mixed relay	Single mixed relay
(Italy) 2020 Antholz-Anterselva	14th	13th	47th	26th	5th	—	—
(Slovenia) 2021 Pokljuka	35th	22nd	14th	14th	5th	—	—
(Germany) 2023 Oberhof	—	16th	—	—	Bronze	9th	—
(Czech Republic) 2024 Nové Město	30th	9th	8th	22nd	Silver	Bronze	—
(Switzerland) 2025 Lenzerheide	6th	10th	Silver	Gold	Bronze	—	—

=== World Cup ===
Season	Overall		Individual		Sprint		Pursuit		Mass start		Under 25	
Season	Points	Position	Points	Position	Points	Position	Points	Position	Points	Position	Points	Position
2019-20	268	24th	32	34th	146	15th	54	34th	36	33rd	—N/a	
2020-21	631	12th	49	18th	220	12th	198	8th	108	13th	631	4th
2021-22	823	2nd	23	33rd	340	2nd	300	2nd	160	2nd	823	1st
2022-23	764	5th	93	9th	263	4th	350	2nd	58	25th	764	1st
2023-24	829	7th	108	7th	265	5th	297	6th	159	5th	829	1st
2024-25	761	4th	106	7th	134	16th	222	6th	299	2nd		
2025-26	922	4th	127	3rd	320	4th	323	5th	152	6th		

==== Individual podiums ====
- 13 victories (3 Sp, 5 Pu, 4 MS, 1 Ind)
- 35 podiums (11 Sp, 14 Pu, 7 MS, 2 Ind, 1 Short Ind)

No.	Season	Date	Location	Race	Place
1	2020–21	3 December 2020	(Finland) Kontiolahti	Sprint	3rd
2	2020–21	19 December 2020	(Austria) Hochfilzen	Pursuit	3rd
3	2021–22	2 December 2021	(Sweden) Östersund	Sprint	2nd
4	2021–22	12 December 2021	(Austria) Hochfilzen	Pursuit	3rd
5	2021–22	16 December 2021	(France) Le Grand-Bornand	Sprint	3rd
6	2021–22	18 December 2021	(France) Le Grand-Bornand	Pursuit	1st
7	2021–22	19 December 2021	(France) Le Grand-Bornand	Mass Start	1st
8	2021–22	12 January 2022	(Germany) Ruhpolding	Sprint	1st
9	2021–22	16 January 2022	(Germany) Ruhpolding	Pursuit	2nd
10	2021–22	11 February 2022	(China) Beijing	Sprint	2nd
11	2021–22	13 February 2022	(China) Beijing	Pursuit	2nd
12	2021–22	12 March 2022	(Estonia) Otepää	Mass Start	1st
13	2022–23	4 December 2022	(Finland) Kontiolahti	Pursuit	3rd
14	2022–23	17 December 2022	(France) Le Grand-Bornand	Pursuit	1st
15	2022–23	5 January 2023	(Slovenia) Pokljuka	Sprint	1st
16	2022–23	7 January 2023	(Slovenia) Pokljuka	Pursuit	1st
17	2022–23	19 January 2023	(Italy) Antholz-Anterselva	Sprint	3rd
18	2022–23	21 January 2023	(Italy) Antholz-Anterselva	Pursuit	3rd
19	2023–24	8 December 2023	(Austria) Hochfilzen	Sprint	2nd
20	2023–24	9 December 2023	(Austria) Hochfilzen	Pursuit	1st
21	2023–24	8 December 2023	(Switzerland) Lenzerheide	Mass Start	2nd
22	2023–24	1 March 2024	(Norway) Holmenkollen	Individual	2nd
23	2024–25	4 December 2024	(Finland) Kontiolahti	Short Individual	3rd
24	2024–25	7 December 2024	(Finland) Kontiolahti	Sprint	2nd
25	2024–25	8 December 2024	(Finland) Kontiolahti	Mass Start	1st
26	2024–25	11 January 2025	(Germany) Oberhof	Pursuit	3rd
27	2024–25	19 January 2025	(Germany) Ruhpolding	Mass Start	1st
28	2024–25	22 March 2025	(Norway) Oslo	Pursuit	2nd
29	2024–25	23 March 2025	(Norway) Oslo	Mass Start	2nd
30	2025–26	8 January 2026	(Germany) Oberhof	Sprint	1st
31	2025–26	11 January 2026	(Germany) Oberhof	Pursuit	1st
32	2025–26	5 March 2026	(Finland) Kontiolahti	Individual	1st
33	2025–26	7 March 2026	(Finland) Kontiolahti	Mass Start	2nd
34	2025–26	19 March 2026	(Norway) Holmenkollen	Sprint	3rd
35	2025–26	21 March 2026	(Norway) Holmenkollen	Mass Start	3rd

==== Team podiums ====
- 10 victories (8 Women, 2 Mixed)
- 36 podiums (28 Women, 8 Mixed)

No.	Season	Date	Location	Race	Place	Team
1	2019–20	8 December 2019	(Sweden) Östersund	Relay	3rd	Persson / E. Öberg / Brorsson / H. Öberg
2	2019–20	11 January 2020	(Germany) Oberhof	Relay	2nd	E. Öberg / Persson / Brorsson / H. Öberg
3	2020–21	5 December 2020	(Finland) Kontiolahti	Relay	1st	Skottheim / Brorsson / E. Öberg / H. Öberg
4	2020–21	12 December 2020	(Austria) Hochfilzen	Relay	3rd	Skottheim / Persson / H. Öberg / E. Öberg
5	2020–21	16 January 2021	(Germany) Oberhof	Relay	3rd	Brorsson / Persson / E. Öberg / H. Öberg
6	2020–21	4 March 2021	(Czech Republic) Nové Město	Relay	1st	Brorsson / H. Öberg / Persson / E. Öberg
7	2020–21	14 March 2021	(Czech Republic) Nové Město	Mixed Relay	3rd	E. Öberg / Magnusson / Nelin / Ponsiluoma
8	2021–22	5 December 2021	(Sweden) Östersund	Relay	3rd	Persson / Brorsson / E. Öberg / H. Öberg
9	2021–22	11 December 2021	(Austria) Hochfilzen	Relay	1st	Persson / Magnusson / E. Öberg / H. Öberg
10	2021–22	16 February 2022	(China) Beijing	Relay	1st	Persson / Brorsson / H. Öberg / E. Öberg
11	2021–22	3 March 2022	(Finland) Kontiolahti	Relay	2nd	Persson / Magnusson / H.Öberg / E. Öberg
12	2021–22	13 March 2022	(Estonia) Otepää	Mixed Relay	2nd	Nelin / Ponsiluoma / Persson / E. Öberg
13	2022–23	1 December 2022	(Finland) Kontiolahti	Relay	1st	Persson / Magnusson / H.Öberg / E. Öberg
14	2022–23	11 December 2022	(Austria) Hochfilzen	Relay	2nd	Persson / Magnusson / H.Öberg / E. Öberg
15	2022–23	8 January 2023	(Slovenia) Pokljuka	Mixed Relay	3rd	Nelin / Ponsiluoma / Brorsson / E. Öberg
16	2022–23	22 January 2023	(Italy) Antholz-Anterselva	Relay	2nd	Persson / Magnusson / H.Öberg / E. Öberg
17	2022–23	18 February 2023	(Germany) Oberhof	Relay	3rd	Persson / Magnusson / E. Öberg / H.Öberg
18	2023–24	29 November 2023	(Sweden) Östersund	Relay	2nd	Magnusson / Persson / E. Öberg / H. Öberg
19	2023–24	10 December 2023	(Austria) Hochfilzen	Relay	2nd	Magnusson / Brorsson / H.Öberg / E. Öberg
20	2023–24	7 January 2024	(Germany) Oberhof	Relay	3rd	Magnusson / Persson / H.Öberg / E. Öberg
21	2023–24	10 January 2024	(Germany) Ruhpolding	Relay	2nd	Magnusson / Persson / Brorsson / E. Öberg
22	2023–24	20 January 2024	(Italy) Antholz-Anterselva	Mixed Relay	3rd	Magnusson / E. Öberg / Nelin / Ponsiluoma
23	2023–24	7 February 2024	(Czech Republic) Nové Město	Relay	2nd	Samuelsson / Ponsiluoma / H.Öberg / E. Öberg
24	2023–24	17 February 2024	(Czech Republic) Nové Město	Relay	2nd	Magnusson / Persson / H.Öberg / E. Öberg
25	2023–24	3 March 2024	(Norway) Oslo - Holmenkollen	Mixed Relay	2nd	Brorsson / E. Öberg / Nelin / Ponsiluoma
26	2023–24	9 March 2024	(United States) Soldier Hollow	Relay	3rd	Magnusson / Brorsson / H.Öberg / E. Öberg
27	2024–25	30 November 2024	(Finland) Kontiolahti	Mixed Relay	3rd	Magnusson / E. Öberg / Nelin / Ponsiluoma
28	2024–25	1 December 2024	(Finland) Kontiolahti	Relay	1st	Magnusson / Andersson / H.Öberg / E. Öberg
29	2024–25	15 December 2024	(Austria) Hochfilzen	Relay	3rd	Magnusson / Heijdenberg / Halvarsson / E. Öberg
30	2024–25	12 January 2025	(Germany) Oberhof	Mixed Relay	1st	Samuelsson / Ponsiluoma / H.Öberg / E. Öberg
31	2024–25	22 February 2025	(Switzerland) Lenzerheide	Relay	3rd	Magnusson / Halvarsson / H.Öberg / E. Öberg
32	2025–26	13 December 2025	(Austria) Hochfilzen	Relay	1st	Halvarsson / Magnusson / E. Öberg / H.Öberg
33	2025–26	14 January 2026	(Germany) Ruhpolding	Relay	3rd	Skottheim / Gestblom / E. Öberg / H.Öberg
34	2025–26	18 February 2026	(Italy) Antholz	Relay	2nd	Gestblom / Magnusson, E.Öberg / H.Öberg
35	2025–26	8 March 2026	(Finland) Kontiolahti	Relay	1st	Gestblom / Magnusson, E.Öberg / H.Öberg
36	2025–26	15 March 2026	(Estonia) Otepää	Mixed Relay	1st	Brandt / Ponsiluoma, Heijdenberg / E.Öberg

*Results are from IBU races which include the Biathlon World Cup, Biathlon World Championships and the Winter Olympic Games.

== Personal life ==
Her sister Hanna Öberg is a professional biathlete who competes with her for the Swedish Women Biathlon team. Since 2025, Elvira has been in a relationship with former Swedish biathlete Oskar Brandt.
