= Biathlon World Championships 2024 – Men's relay =

Men's relay at the Biathlon World Championships 2024
- Venue: Vysočina Arena
- Location: Nové Město na Moravě, Czech Republic
- Dates: 17 February
- Competitors: 96 from 24 nations
- Teams: 24
- Winning time: 1:16:22.6

Medalists
gold medal	Viktor Brandt; Jesper Nelin; Martin Ponsiluoma; Sebastian Samuelsson	Sweden
silver medal	Sturla Holm Lægreid; Tarjei Bø; Johannes Thingnes Bø; Vetle Sjåstad Christiansen	Norway
bronze medal	Éric Perrot; Fabien Claude; Émilien Jacquelin; Quentin Fillon Maillet	France

The Men's relay competition at the Biathlon World Championships 2024 was held on 17 February 2024.

Team France was the defending champion but they did not defend their title, finishing the competition in 3rd place.

Team Sweden became the new world champion, winning the first ever gold medal at the men's relay world championships. The silver medal was won by the team Norway.

== Results ==
The race was started at 16:30.

Rank	Bib	Team	Time	Penalties (P+S)	Deficit
1st place, gold medalist(s)	5	Sweden Viktor Brandt; Jesper Nelin; Martin Ponsiluoma; Sebastian Samuelsson	1:16:22.6; 19:02.1; 19:17.3; 18:46.3; 19:16.9	0+4 0+5; 0+0 0+2; 0+0 0+2; 0+2 0+1; 0+2 0+0	
2nd place, silver medalist(s)	1	Norway Sturla Holm Lægreid; Tarjei Bø; Johannes Thingnes Bø; Vetle Sjåstad Christiansen	1:16:34.4; 19:23.3; 18:37.5; 18:34.6; 19:59.0	0+3 4+8; 0+1 1+3; 0+0 0+2; 0+2 0+0; 0+0 3+3	+11.8
3rd place, bronze medalist(s)	3	France Éric Perrot; Fabien Claude; Émilien Jacquelin; Quentin Fillon Maillet	1:16:35.4; 19:09.4; 19:48.0; 18:49.5; 18:48.5	2+7 1+6; 0+3 1+3; 2+3 0+0; 0+1 0+2; 0+0 0+1	+12.8
4	2	Germany Justus Strelow; Johannes Kühn; Philipp Nawrath; Benedikt Doll	1:17:14.2; 18:39.9; 20:06.5; 18:48.7; 19:39.1	0+1 1+7; 0+0 0+0; 0+1 1+3; 0+0 0+1; 0+0 0+3	+51.6
5	14	United States Vincent Bonacci; Sean Doherty; Campbell Wright; Jake Brown	1:17:44.8; 19:22.0; 19:35.7; 18:50.2; 19:56.9	0+2 0+6; 0+2 0+0; 0+0 0+3; 0+0 0+1; 0+0 0+2	+1:22.2
6	4	Italy Elia Zeni; Didier Bionaz; Lukas Hofer; Tommaso Giacomel	1:18:06.7; 19:40.9; 20:21.2; 19:12.0; 18:52.6	1+5 0+6; 0+0 0+3; 1+3 0+1; 0+2 0+0; 0+0 0+2	+1:44.1
7	9	Czech Republic Tomáš Mikyska; Michal Krčmář; Jonáš Mareček; Vítězslav Hornig	1:18:10.6; 18:39.0; 19:27.2; 19:35.7; 20:28.7	0+2 0+4; 0+0 0+0; 0+1 0+0; 0+1 0+1; 0+0 0+3	+1:48.0
8	10	Finland Jaakko Ranta; Otto Invenius; Tero Seppälä; Olli Hiidensalo	1:18:46.5; 19:32.8; 19:12.9; 19:10.9; 20:49.9	0+4 1+7; 0+2 0+3; 0+1 0+0; 0+1 0+1; 0+0 1+3	+2:23.9
9	17	Poland Konrad Badacz; Andrzej Nędza-Kubiniec; Jan Guńka; Marcin Zawół	1:19:26.0; 19:16.3; 19:52.8; 20:04.6; 20:12.3	0+2 0+4; 0+0 0+1; 0+1 0+1; 0+1 0+3; 0+0 0+0	+3:03.4
10	12	Kazakhstan Alexandr Mukhin; Vladislav Kireyev; Asset Dyussenov; Nikita Akimov	1:19:34.2; 18:39.5; 20:01.4; 19:55.3; 20:58.0	0+8 0+2; 0+0 0+0; 0+3 0+0; 0+2 0+0; 0+3 0+2	+3:11.6
11	8	Slovenia Miha Dovžan; Jakov Fak; Lovro Planko; Anton Vidmar	1:19:40.5; 19:21.6; 19:27.7; 20:14.0; 20:37.2	0+6 0+8; 0+1 0+3; 0+1 0+3; 0+1 0+1; 0+3 0+1	+3:17.9
12	6	Austria David Komatz; Simon Eder; Felix Leitner; Patrick Jakob	1:19:44.6; 20:08.1; 19:21.9; 20:06.8; 20:07.8	0+3 1+6; 0+2 1+3; 0+0 0+0; 0+0 0+2; 0+1 0+1	+3:22.0
13	11	Ukraine Artem Pryma; Dmytro Pidruchnyi; Denys Nasyko; Anton Dudchenko	1:20:06.3; 19:28.8; 19:14.4; 21:07.0; 20:16.1	0+3 1+8; 0+2 0+2; 0+1 0+1; 0+0 1+3; 0+0 0+2	+3:43.7
14	7	Switzerland Joscha Burkhalter; Sebastian Stalder; Jeremy Finello; Niklas Hartweg	1:20:35.3; 19:51.9; 19:37.7; 20:52.7; 20:13.0	1+9 1+6; 0+3 0+2; 0+1 0+0; 1+3 1+3; 0+2 0+1	+4:12.7
15	13	Romania Dmitrii Shamaev; George Colțea; George Buta; Raul Flore	1:20:52.1; 19:27.9; 20:17.6; 20:21.5; 20:45.1	0+5 0+6; 0+0 0+1; 0+2 0+3; 0+1 0+1; 0+2 0+1	+4:29.5
16	15	Latvia Renārs Birkentāls; Edgars Mise; Aleksandrs Patrijuks; Andrejs Rastorgujevs	1:21:11.9; 19:29.8; 20:17.6; 22:06.6; 19:17.9	0+3 2+11; 0+0 0+3; 0+0 0+3; 0+3 2+3; 0+0 0+2	+4:49.3
17	21	Estonia Rene Zahkna; Kristo Siimer; Jakob Kulbin; Raido Ränkel	1:21:12.0; 18:38.6; 22:08.8; 20:04.7; 20:19.9	2+5 3+8; 0+0 0+1; 2+3 2+3; 0+1 0+1; 0+1 1+3	+4:49.4
18	18	Bulgaria Blagoy Todev; Anton Sinapov; Vasil Zashev; Konstantin Vasilev	1:21:54.7; 19:06.4; 20:22.5; 21:06.0; 21:19.8	0+4 0+4; 0+1 0+1; 0+0 0+0; 0+1 0+2; 0+2 0+1	+5:32.1
19	22	Canada Christian Gow; Logan Pletz; Haldan Borglum; Adam Runnalls	1:22:12.2; 19:29.3; 20:30.7; 21:45.1; 20:27.1	0+2 0+2; 0+1 0+0; 0+0 0+1; 0+1 0+1; 0+0 0+0	+5:49.6
20	16	Lithuania Tomas Kaukėnas; Vytautas Strolia; Maksim Fomin; Jokūbas Mackinė	1:22:22.1; 19:53.8; 19:35.3; 21:00.4; 21:52.6	0+3 2+9; 0+0 0+3; 0+0 0+0; 0+2 1+3; 0+1 1+3	+5:59.5
21	19	Moldova Mihail Usov; Pavel Magazeev; Maksim Makarov; Andrei Usov	1:22:34.9; 20:07.9; 20:22.0; 19:51.4; 22:13.6	0+4 0+5; 0+0 0+2; 0+0 0+0; 0+1 0+0; 0+3 0+3	+6:12.3
22	20	Belgium Florent Claude; Cesar Beauvais; Marek Mackels; Julien Petitjacques	1:23:01.1; 18:46.5; 21:14.0; 21:13.6; 21:47.0	0+2 1+10; 0+0 0+1; 0+0 1+3; 0+2 0+3; 0+0 0+3	+6:38.5
23	24	Slovakia Tomáš Sklenárik; Damián Cesnek; Matej Badan; Matej Kazár | valign=top|LAP; 20:16.3; 21:06.1	0+3 1+3; 0+1 0+2; 0+0 0+1		
24	23	South Korea Alexandr Starodubets; Timofey Lapshin; Choi Du-jin; Kang Yoonjae | valign=top|LAP; 21:15.3; 20:36.9	1+3 0+2; 0+2 0+3; 0+1 0+2		
