= Lena Häcki-Groß =

Swiss biathlete (born 1995)

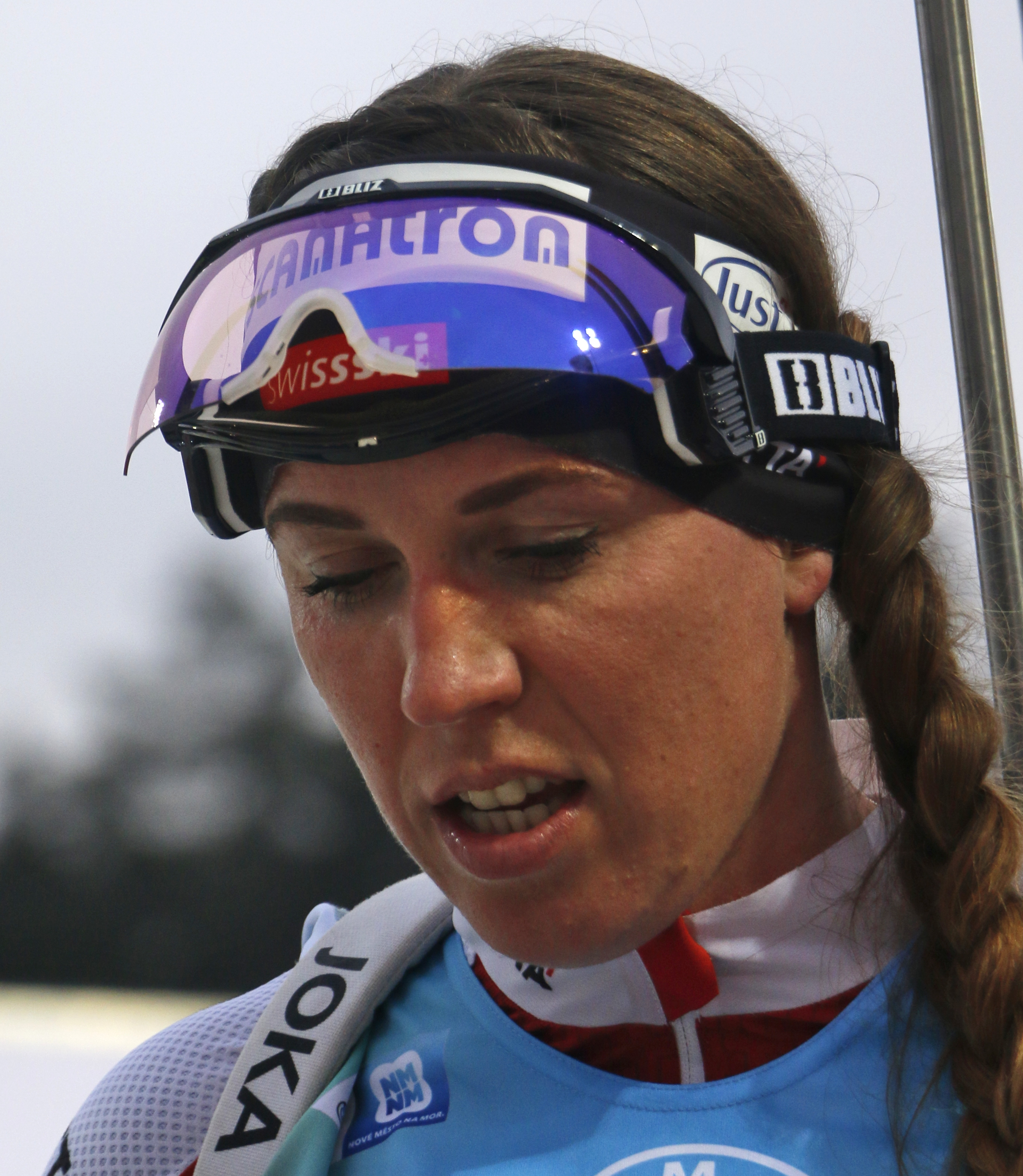
- Häcki in 2023

Personal information
- Nationality: Swiss
- Born: 1 July 1995 (age 30) Engelberg, Switzerland

Sport
- Country: Switzerland
- Sport: Biathlon
Medal record
Representing Switzerland
Junior World Championships
Silver medal – second place	2016 Cheile Grădiştei	7.5 km sprint
Silver medal – second place	2016 Cheile Grădiştei	10 km pursuit
Youth World Championships
Bronze medal – third place	2013 Obertilliach	3 × 6 km relay

Lena Häcki-Groß (born 1 July 1995) is a Swiss biathlete. She competed in the 2014/15 World Cup season, and represented Switzerland at the Biathlon World Championships 2015 in Kontiolahti.

== Biathlon results ==
All results are sourced from the International Biathlon Union.

=== Olympic Games ===
0 medals

Event	Individual	Sprint	Pursuit	Mass start	Relay	Mixed relay
(South Korea) 2018 Pyeongchang	34th	26th	8th	23rd	6th	13th
(China) 2022 Beijing	24th	23rd	24th	16th	DNF	8th
(Italy) 2026 Milano Cortina	42nd	60th	54th	—	8th	—

=== World Championships ===
Event	Individual	Sprint	Pursuit	Mass start	Relay	Mixed relay	Single mixed relay
(Finland) 2015 Kontiolahti	85th	27th	35th	–	21st	–	—N/a
(Norway) 2016 Oslo	67th	21st	33rd	–	16th	–	—N/a
(Austria) 2017 Hochfilzen	85th	35th	48th	–	13th	14th	—N/a
(Sweden) 2019 Östersund	11th	53rd	14th	30th	13th	11th	–
(Italy) 2020 Antholz-Anterselva	59th	63rd	–	–	6th	10th	5th
(Slovenia) 2021 Pokljuka	12th	7th	12th	15th	12th	10th	–
(Germany) 2023 Oberhof	9th	28th	33rd	11th	8th	7th	12th
(Czech Republic) 2024 Nové Město	17th	66th	–	24th	9th	4th	5th
(Switzerland) 2025 Lenzerheide	16th	4th	5th	21st	14th	6th	–

=== Individual podiums ===
- 2 win
- 7 podiums

No.	Season	Date	Location	Level	Race	Place
1	2019–20	21 December 2019	(France) Annecy	World Cup	Pursuit	3rd
2	2023–24	9 December 2023	(Austria) Hochfilzen	World Cup	Pursuit	2nd
3	2023–24	19 January 2024	(Italy) Antholz-Anterselva	World Cup	Short individual	1st
4	2023–24	21 January 2024	(Italy) Antholz-Anterselva	World Cup	Mass Start	3rd
5	2023–24	2 March 2024	(Norway) Oslo Holmenkollen	World Cup	Mass Start	1st
6	2023–24	14 March 2024	(Canada) Canmore	World Cup	Sprint	3rd
7	2024–25	22 March 2025	(Norway) Oslo Holmenkollen	World Cup	Pursuit	3rd
