= Martin Ponsiluoma =

Swedish biathlete (born 1995)

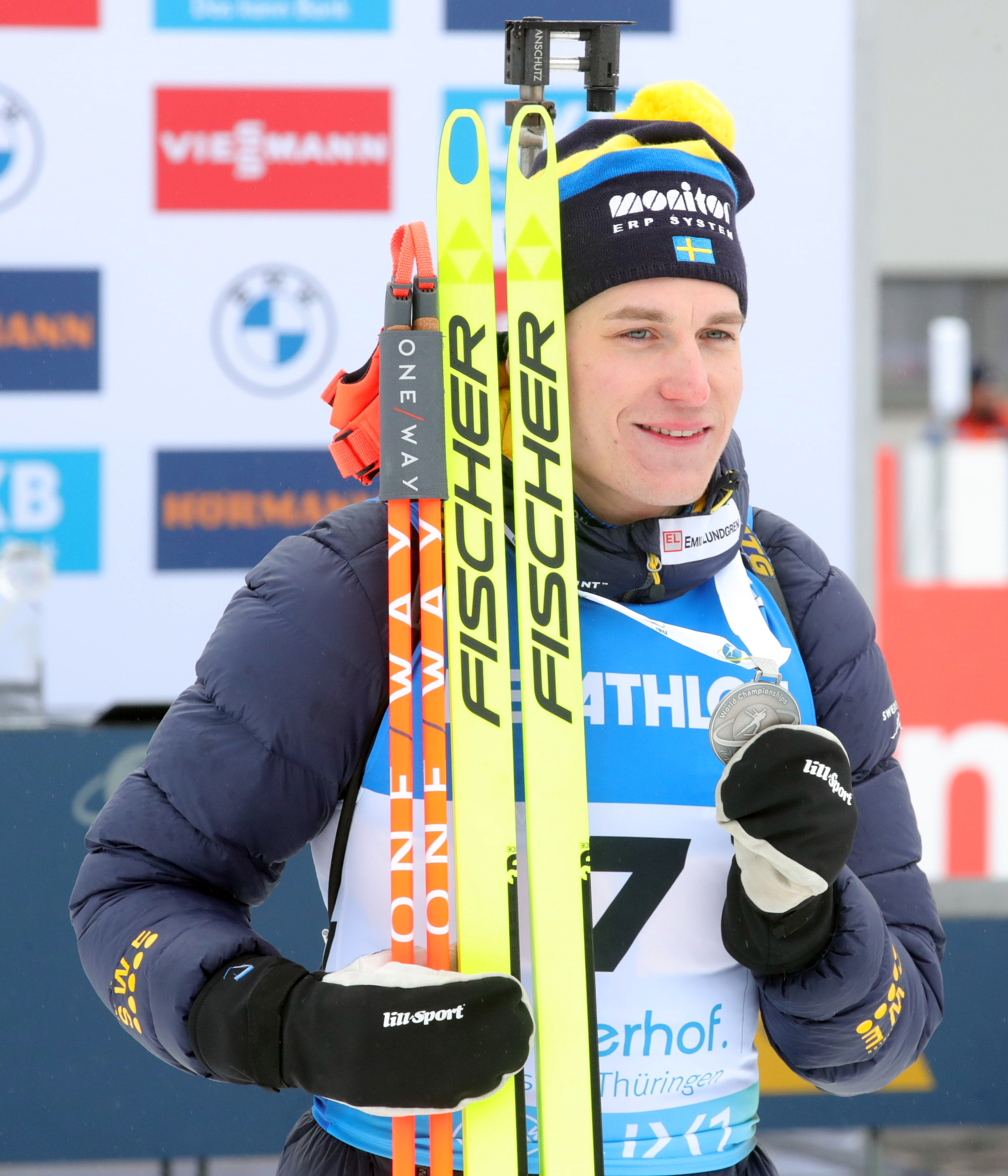
- Ponsiluoma in 2023

Personal information
- Nationality: Swedish
- Born: 8 September 1995 (age 30) Östersund, Sweden
- Height: 1.84 m (6 ft 0 in)
- Weight: 80 kg (176 lb)

Sport

Professional information
- Sport: Biathlon
- Club: Tullus SG
- World Cup debut: 2017

Olympic Games
- Teams: 3 (2018, 2022, 2026)
- Medals: 3 (1 gold)

World Championships
- Teams: 5 (2019–2024)
- Medals: 7 (2 gold)

World Cup
- Seasons: 8 (2017/18–)
- Individual victories: 3
- All victories: 9
- Individual podiums: 15
- All podiums: 44
- Overall titles: 0
- Discipline titles: 0
Medal record
Men's biathlon
Representing Sweden
International biathlon competitions
Event	1st	2nd	3rd
Olympic Games	1	1	1
World Championships	2	2	3
Total	3	3	4
Olympic Games
Gold medal – first place	2026 Milano Cortina	12.5 km pursuit
Silver medal – second place	2022 Beijing	15 km mass start
Bronze medal – third place	2026 Milano Cortina	4 × 7.5 km relay
World Championships
Gold medal – first place	2021 Pokljuka	10 km sprint
Gold medal – first place	2024 Nové Město	4 × 7.5 km relay
Silver medal – second place	2021 Pokljuka	4 × 7.5 km relay
Silver medal – second place	2023 Oberhof	15 km mass start
Bronze medal – third place	2021 Pokljuka	Mixed relay
Bronze medal – third place	2023 Oberhof	4 × 7.5 km relay
Bronze medal – third place	2024 Nové Město	Mixed relay
European Championships
Gold medal – first place	2019 Raubichi	Mixed relay

Martin Ponsiluoma (born 8 September 1995) is a Swedish biathlete who competes internationally.

He participated in the 2018 Winter Olympics, 2022 Winter Olympics and the 2026 Winter Olympics, winning a silver in mass start in 2022 and the gold medal in the 2026 pursuit.

He ended up on a World Cup podium position for first time when he came third during competitions in Nové Město na Moravě, Czech Republic on 20 December 2018. In the 2021 World Championships, he won gold in the sprint, which was also his first world cup win.

== Personal life ==
Ponsiluoma's father, Jyrki Ponsiluoma, is a Finnish-born Swedish former cross-country skier. He has been in a relationship with fellow biathlete Hanna Öberg since 2021.

== Biathlon results ==
All results are sourced from the International Biathlon Union.

=== Olympic Games ===
3 medals (1 gold, 1 silver, 1 bronze)

Event	Individual	Sprint	Pursuit	Mass start	Relay	Mixed relay
(South Korea) 2018 Pyeongchang	38th	—	—	—	—	–
(China) 2022 Beijing	12th	6th	11th	Silver	5th	4th
(Italy) 2026 Antholz	9th	7th	Gold	21st	Bronze	5th

=== World Championships ===
7 medals (2 gold, 2 silver, 3 bronze)

Event	Individual	Sprint	Pursuit	Mass start	Relay	Mixed relay	Single mixed relay
(Sweden) 2019 Östersund	47th	—	—	—	7th	—	—
(Italy) 2020 Antholz	29th	27th	23rd	29th	10th	—	—
(Slovenia) 2021 Pokljuka	34th	Gold	12th	19th	Silver	Bronze	—
(Germany) 2023 Oberhof	11th	18th	18th	Silver	Bronze	9th	—
(Czech Republic) 2024 Nové Město	39th	10th	7th	13th	Gold	Bronze	—
(Switzerland) 2025 Lenzerheide	19th	27th	9th	5th	4th	5th	—

*During Olympic seasons competitions are only held for those events not included in the Olympic program.

=== World Cup ===
==== Overall standings ====
Season	Overall		Individual		Sprint		Pursuit		Mass start	
Season	Points	Position	Points	Position	Points	Position	Points	Position	Points	Position
2017–18	4	96th	–	–	4	85th	–	–	–	–
2018–19	163	38th	23	45th	79	35th	39	48th	22	37th
2019–20	173	33rd	23	39th	64	34th	74	22nd	12	44th
2020–21	713	10th	44	23rd	269	9th	185	12th	125	13th
2021–22	381	22nd	–	–	191	12th	147	16th	43	26th
2022–23	779	5th	132	3rd	328	3rd	232	8th	87	15th
2023–24	638	10th	64	16th	187	15th	238	9th	149	6th
2024–25	488	15th	80	13th	146	20th	165	11th	97	18th
2025–26	727	8th	38	32nd	242	11th	298	7th	149	6th

==== Individual podiums ====
- 3 victories
- 15 podiums

No.	Season	Date	Location	Level	Race	Place
1	2018–19	20 December 2018	(Czech Republic) Nové Město	World Cup	Sprint	3rd
2	2020–21	29 November 2020	(Finland) Kontiolahti	World Cup	Sprint	3rd
3	2020–21	20 December 2020	(Austria) Hochfilzen	World Cup	Mass Start	2nd
4	2020–21	12 February 2021	(Slovenia) Pokljuka	World Championships	Sprint	1st
5	2021–22	10 December 2021	(Austria) Hochfilzen	World Cup	Sprint	2nd
6	2021–22	18 February 2022	(China) Beijing	Winter Olympic Games	Mass Start	2nd
7	2022–23	29 November 2022	(Finland) Kontiolahti	World Cup	Individual	1st
8	2022–23	20 January 2023	(Italy) Antholz-Anterselva	World Cup	Sprint	2nd
9	2022–23	21 January 2023	(Italy) Antholz-Anterselva	World Cup	Pursuit	3rd
10	2022–23	19 February 2023	(Germany) Oberhof	World Championships	Mass Start	2nd
11	2022–23	4 March 2023	(Czech Republic) Nové Město	World Cup	Pursuit	3rd
12	2022–23	16 March 2023	(Norway) Oslo Holmenkollen	World Cup	Sprint	2nd
13	2024–25	13 March 2025	(Slovenia) Pokljuka	World Cup	Individual	3rd
14	2025–26	18 January 2026	(Germany) Ruhpolding	World Cup	Pursuit	3rd
15	2025–26	15 February 2026	(Italy) Antholz-Anterselva	Winter Olympic Games	Pursuit	1st

==== Team podiums ====
- 7 victories
- 31 podiums

No.	Season	Date	Location	Level	Race	Place	Teammate(s)
1	2017–18	7 January 2018	(Germany) Oberhof	World Cup	Relay	1st	Samuelsson, Nelin, Lindström
2	2018–19	16 December 2018	(Austria) Hochfilzen	World Cup	Relay	1st	Femling, Samuelsson, Stenersen
3	2019–20	30 November 2019	(Sweden) Östersund	World Cup	Mixed Relay	3rd	Persson, Brorsson, Nelin
4	2019–20	7 March 2020	(Czech Republic) Nové Město	World Cup	Relay	3rd	Femling, Nelin, Samuelsson
5	2020–21	6 December 2020	(Finland) Kontiolahti	World Cup	Relay	2nd	Femling, Nelin, Samuelsson
6	2020–21	13 December 2020	(Austria) Hochfilzen	World Cup	Relay	1st	Femling, Nelin, Samuelsson
7	2020–21	10 February 2021	(Slovenia) Pokljuka	World Championships	Mixed Relay	3rd	Samuelsson, Persson, H. Öberg
8	2020–21	20 February 2021	(Slovenia) Pokljuka	World Championships	Relay	2nd	Femling, Nelin, Samuelsson
9	2020–21	14 March 2021	(Czech Republic) Nové Město	World Cup	Mixed Relay	3rd	E. Öberg, Magnusson, Nelin
10	2021–22	4 March 2022	(Finland) Kontiolahti	World Cup	Relay	2nd	Femling, Nelin, Samuelsson
11	2021–22	13 March 2022	(Estonia) Otepää	World Cup	Mixed Relay	2nd	Nelin, Persson, E. Öberg
12	2022–23	8 January 2023	(Slovenia) Pokljuka	World Cup	Mixed Relay	3rd	Nelin, Brorsson, E. Öberg
13	2022–23	18 February 2023	(Germany) Oberhof	World Championships	Relay	3rd	Femling, Nelin, Samuelsson
14	2022–23	5 March 2023	(Czech Republic) Nové Město	World Cup	Mixed Relay	2nd	Magnusson, H. Öberg, Samuelsson
15	2023–24	20 January 2024	(Italy) Antholz-Anterselva	World Cup	Mixed Relay	3rd	Magnusson, E. Öberg, Nelin
16	2023–24	7 February 2024	(Czech Republic) Nové Město	World Championships	Mixed Relay	3rd	Samuelsson, E. Öberg, H. Öberg
17	2023–24	17 February 2024	(Czech Republic) Nové Město	World Championships	Relay	1st	Brandt, Nelin, Samuelsson
18	2023–24	5 March 2024	(Norway) Oslo Holmenkollen	World Cup	Mixed Relay	2nd	Brorsson, E. Öberg, Nelin
19	2024–25	30 November 2024	(Finland) Kontiolahti	World Cup	Mixed Relay	3rd	Magnusson, E. Öberg, Nelin
20	2024–25	1 December 2024	(Finland) Kontiolahti	World Cup	Relay	3rd	Brandt, Nelin, Samuelsson
21	2024–25	15 December 2024	(Austria) Hochfilzen	World Cup	Relay	3rd	Brandt, Nelin, Samuelsson
22	2024–25	12 January 2025	(Germany) Oberhof	World Cup	Mixed Relay	1st	Samuelsson, H. Öberg, E. Öberg
23	2024–25	17 January 2025	(Germany) Ruhpolding	World Cup	Relay	2nd	Brandt, Nelin, Samuelsson
24	2024–25	25 January 2025	(Italy) Antholz-Anterselva	World Cup	Relay	3rd	Brandt, Nelin, Samuelsson
25	2024–25	16 March 2025	(Slovenia) Pokljuka	World Cup	Mixed Relay	1st	Anna-Karin Heijdenberg, H. Öberg, Samuelsson
26	2025–26	29 November 2025	(Sweden) Östersund	World Cup	Relay	3rd	Brandt, Nelin, Samuelsson
27	2025–26	14 December 2025	(Austria) Hochfilzen	World Cup	Relay	3rd	Stefansson, Nelin, Samuelsson
28	2025–26	11 January 2026	(Germany) Oberhof	World Cup	Relay	3rd	Nelin, Stefansson, Samuelsson
29	2025–26	17 February 2026	(Italy) Antholz-Anterselva	Winter Olympic Games	Relay	3rd	Brandt, Nelin, Samuelsson
30	2025–26	7 March 2026	(Finland) Kontiolahti	World Cup	Relay	3rd	Brandt, Nelin, Samuelsson
31	2025–26	15 March 2026	(Estonia) Otepää	World Cup	Mixed Relay	1st	Brandt, Heijdenberg, E. Öberg
