= Sebastian Samuelsson =

Swedish biathlete (born 1997)

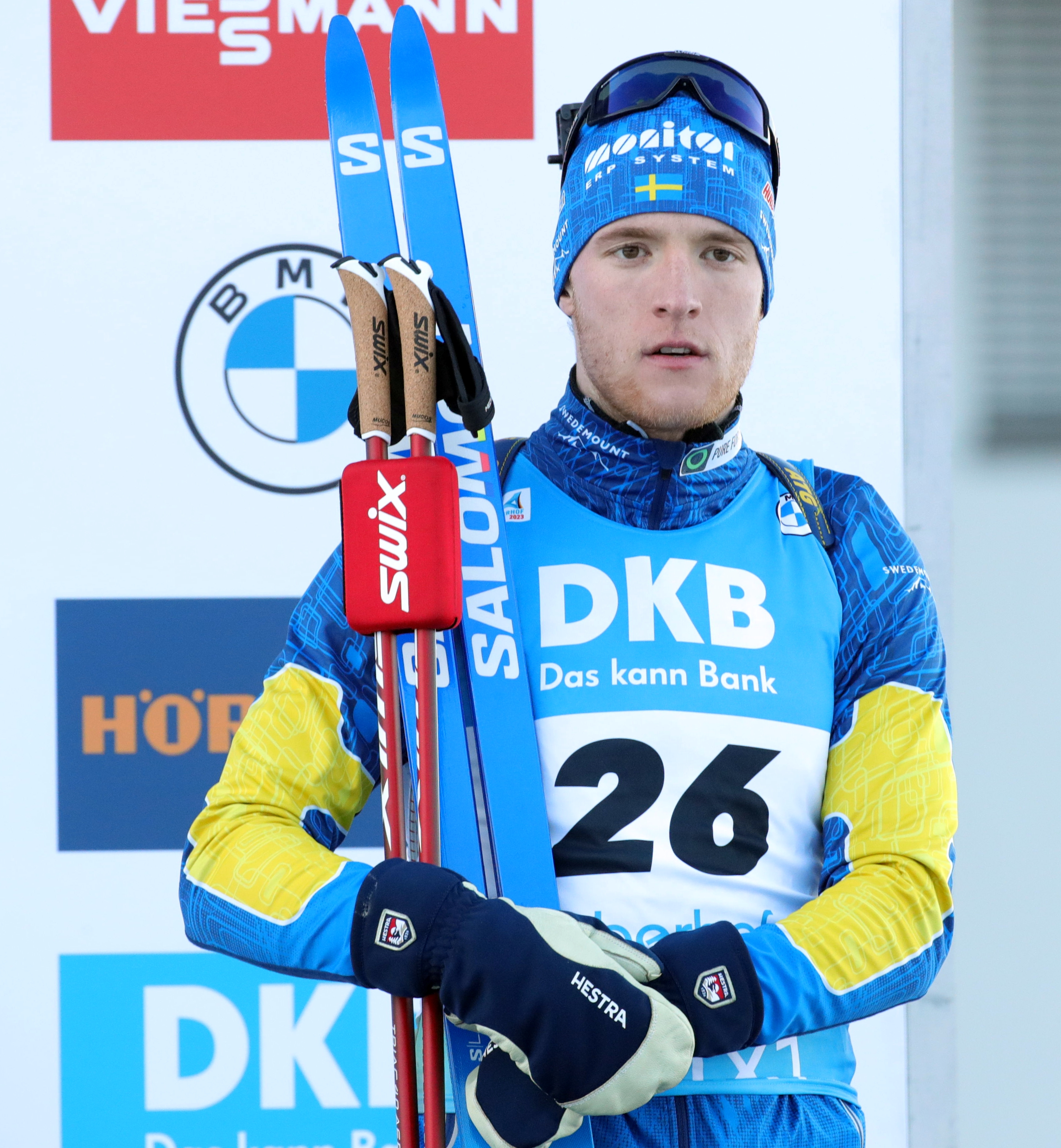
- Samuelsson in 2023

Personal information
- Nationality: Swedish
- Born: 28 March 1997 (age 29) Katrineholm, Sweden
- Height: 1.83 m (6 ft 0 in)
- Weight: 78 kg (172 lb)

Sport

Professional information
- Sport: Biathlon
- Club: I 21 IF
- World Cup debut: 3 December 2016

Olympic Games
- Teams: 3 (2018, 2022, 2026)
- Medals: 3 (1 gold)

World Championships
- Teams: 6 (2017–2024)
- Medals: 11 (2 gold)

World Cup
- Seasons: 3 (2016/17–)
- Individual races: 24
- All races: 34
- All victories: 1
Medal record
Men's biathlon
Representing Sweden
International biathlon competitions
Event	1st	2nd	3rd
Olympic Games	1	1	1
World Championships	2	2	7
Total	3	3	8
Olympic Games
Gold medal – first place	2018 Pyeongchang	4 × 7.5 km relay
Silver medal – second place	2018 Pyeongchang	12.5 km pursuit
Bronze medal – third place	2026 Milano Cortina	4 × 7.5 km relay
World Championships
Gold medal – first place	2023 Oberhof	15 km mass start
Gold medal – first place	2024 Nové Město	4 × 7.5 km relay
Silver medal – second place	2021 Pokljuka	12.5 km pursuit
Silver medal – second place	2021 Pokljuka	4 × 7.5 km relay
Bronze medal – third place	2019 Östersund	Single mixed relay
Bronze medal – third place	2021 Pokljuka	Mixed relay
Bronze medal – third place	2021 Pokljuka	Single mixed relay
Bronze medal – third place	2023 Oberhof	12.5 km pursuit
Bronze medal – third place	2023 Oberhof	20 km individual
Bronze medal – third place	2023 Oberhof	4 × 7.5 km relay
Bronze medal – third place	2024 Nové Město	Mixed relay
European Championships
Gold medal – first place	2019 Raubichi	Mixed Relay

Sebastian Samuelsson (born 28 March 1997) is a Swedish biathlete who competes internationally. He participated in the 2018 Winter Olympics, where he won a silver medal in the 12.5 km pursuit event and a gold medal in the relay. He became a world champion at the 2023 Oberhof when he won the gold medal in the 15 km Mass start race.

Samuelsson has been outspoken in his views on the presence of doping in the sport, and has especially been critical of Russia and its anti-doping agency RUSADA.

== Summer biathlon ==
In August 2019, he became Swedish champion at the 10 kilometres sprint distance and the 20 kilometres distance during the Swedish national summer biathlon championships in Sollefteå.

== Biathlon results ==
All results are sourced from the International Biathlon Union.

=== Olympic Games ===
3 medals (1 gold, 1 silver, 1 bronze)

Event	Individual	Sprint	Pursuit	Mass start	Relay	Mixed relay
Representing Sweden
(South Korea) 2018 Pyeongchang	4th	14th	Silver	23rd	Gold	—
(China) 2022 Beijing	30th	5th	8th	11th	5th	4th
(Italy) 2026 Milano Cortina	7th	5th	12th	18th	Bronze	5th

=== World Championships ===
11 medals (2 gold, 2 silver, 7 bronze)

Event	Individual	Sprint	Pursuit	Mass start	Relay	Mixed relay	Single mixed relay
Representing Sweden
(Austria) 2017 Hochfilzen	52nd	76th	—	—	11th	—	—N/a
(Sweden) 2019 Östersund	4th	29th	16th	26th	7th	5th	Bronze
(Italy) 2020 Antholz	10th	11th	19th	27th	10th	11th	4th
(Slovenia) 2021 Pokljuka	24th	8th	Silver	10th	Silver	Bronze	Bronze
(Germany) 2023 Oberhof	Bronze	11th	Bronze	Gold	Bronze	9th	4th
(Czech Republic) 2024 Nové Město	7th	5th	6th	23rd	Gold	Bronze	4th
(Switzerland) 2025 Lenzerheide	47th	24th	13th	12th	4th	5th	5th

*During Olympic seasons competitions are only held for those events not included in the Olympic program.
**The single mixed relay was added as an event in 2019.

=== World Cup ===
==== Overall standings ====
Season	Overall			Individual		Sprint		Pursuit		Mass start	
Season	Races	Points	Position	Points	Position	Points	Position	Points	Position	Points	Position
2016–17	18/26	169	43rd	16	46th	82	36th	67	42nd	4	44th
2017–18	11/22	117	44th	2	58th	53	44th	62	32nd	0	–
2018–19	20/25	385	22nd	75	9th	165	16th	99	28th	46	28th
2019–20	16/21	241	28th	49	20th	122	21st	62	26th	8	46th
2020–21	26/26	817	6th	54	15th	312	4th	253	5th	121	15th
2021–22	20/22	717	3rd	1	57th	340	2nd	282	2nd	94	15th
2022–23	16/21	446	14th	56	21st	149	16th	203	12th	38	29th
2023–24	18/21	671	9th	61	17th	241	10th	315	4th	54	24th
2024–25	21/21	875	4th	81	12th	268	6th	290	3rd	236	4th
2025–26	21/21	918	4th	94	7th	356	2nd	343	2nd	125	10th

==== Individual podiums ====
- 7 victories – (3 Sp, 3 Pu, 1 MS)
- 22 podiums

No.	Season	Date	Location	Level	Race	Place
1	2018–19	11 January 2019	(Germany) Oberhof	World Cup	Sprint	3rd
2	2020–21	29 November 2020	(Finland) Kontiolahti	World Cup	Sprint	2nd
3	2020–21	5 December 2020	(Finland) Kontiolahti	World Cup	Pursuit	1st
4	2020–21	6 March 2021	(Czech Republic) Nové Město	World Cup	Sprint	2nd
5	2020–21	19 March 2021	(Sweden) Östersund	World Cup	Sprint	2nd
6	2021–22	28 November 2021	(Sweden) Östersund	World Cup	Sprint	1st
7	2021–22	2 December 2021	(Sweden) Östersund	World Cup	Sprint	1st
8	2021–22	5 December 2021	(Sweden) Östersund	World Cup	Pursuit	2nd
9	2021–22	11 December 2021	(Austria) Hochfilzen	World Cup	Pursuit	3rd
10	2021–22	9 January 2022	(Germany) Oberhof	World Cup	Pursuit	2nd
11	2021–22	18 March 2022	(Norway) Oslo Holmenkollen	World Cup	Sprint	3rd
12	2023–24	3 December 2023	(Sweden) Östersund	World Cup	Pursuit	1st
13	2023–24	8 December 2023	(Austria) Hochfilzen	World Cup	Sprint	3rd
14	2023–24	16 March 2024	(Canada) Canmore	World Cup	Pursuit	2nd
15	2024–25	6 December 2024	(Finland) Kontiolahti	World Cup	Sprint	2nd
16	2024–25	19 December 2024	(France) Annecy Le Grand-Bornand	World Cup	Sprint	3rd
17	2024–25	8 March 2025	(Czech Republic) Nové Město na Moravě	World Cup	Pursuit	1st
18	2024–25	23 March 2025	(Norway) Oslo Holmenkollen	World Cup	Mass Start	1st
19	2025–26	3 December 2025	(Sweden) Östersund	World Cup	Sprint	3rd
20	2025–26	7 December 2025	(Sweden) Östersund	World Cup	Pursuit	2nd
21	2025–26	10 January 2026	(Germany) Oberhof	World Cup	Pursuit	3rd
22	2025–26	17 January 2026	(Germany) Ruhpolding	World Cup	Sprint	1st

==== Team podiums ====
- 9 victories
- 26 podiums

No.	Season	Date	Location	Level	Race	Place	Teammate(s)
1	2017–18	7 January 2018	(Germany) Oberhof	World Cup	Relay	1st	Ponsilouma, Nelin, Lindström
2	2017–18	23 February 2018	(South Korea) Pyeongchang	Olympics	Relay	1st	Femling, Nelin, Lindström
3	2018–19	16 December 2018	(Austria) Hochfilzen	World Cup	Relay	1st	Femling, Ponsiluoma, Stenersen
4	2018–19	14 March 2019	(Sweden) Östersund	World Championships	Single Mixed Relay	3rd	Hanna Öberg
5	2019–20	30 November 2019	(Sweden) Östersund	World Cup	Single Mixed Relay	1st	Hanna Öberg
6	2019–20	7 March 2020	(Czech Republic) Nové Město	World Cup	Relay	3rd	Femling, Nelin, Ponsiluoma
7	2020–21	6 December 2020	(Finland) Kontiolahti	World Cup	Relay	2nd	Femling, Nelin, Ponsiluoma
8	2020–21	13 December 2020	(Austria) Hochfilzen	World Cup	Relay	1st	Femling, Nelin, Ponsiluoma
9	2020–21	10 January 2021	(Germany) Oberhof	World Cup	Single Mixed Relay	2nd	Hanna Öberg
10	2020–21	10 February 2021	(Slovenia) Pokljuka	World Championships	Mixed Relay	3rd	Ponsiluoma, Persson, H. Öberg
11	2020–21	18 February 2021	(Slovenia) Pokljuka	World Championships	Single Mixed Relay	3rd	Hanna Öberg
12	2020–21	20 February 2021	(Slovenia) Pokljuka	World Championships	Relay	2nd	Femling, Nelin, Ponsiluoma
13	2020–21	14 March 2021	(Czech Republic) Nové Město	World Cup	Single Mixed Relay	1st	Linn Persson
14	2021–22	4 March 2022	(Finland) Kontiolahti	World Cup	Relay	2nd	Femling, Nelin, Ponsiluoma
15	2021–22	13 March 2022	(Estonia) Otepää	World Cup	Single Mixed Relay	2nd	Hanna Öberg
16	2022–23	10 December 2022	(Austria) Hochfilzen	World Cup	Relay	2nd	Nelin, Ponsiluoma, Femling
17	2022–23	18 February 2023	(Germany) Oberhof	World Championships	Relay	3rd	Femling, Ponsiluoma, Nelin
18	2022–23	5 March 2023	(Czech Republic) Nové Město	World Cup	Mixed Relay	2nd	Magnusson, H. Öberg, Ponsiluoma
19	2023–24	25 November 2023	(Sweden) Östersund	World Cup	Single Mixed Relay	1st	Hanna Öberg
20	2023–24	7 February 2024	(Czech Republic) Nové Město	World Championships	Mixed Relay	3rd	Ponsiluoma, H. Öberg, E. Öberg
21	2023–24	17 February 2024	(Czech Republic) Nové Město	World Championships	Relay	1st	V. Brandt, Nelin, Ponsiluoma
22	2023–24	3 March 2024	(Norway) Holmenkollen	World Cup	Single Mixed Relay	2nd	Anna Magnusson
23	2024–25	30 November 2024	(Finland) Kontiolahti	World Cup	Single Mixed Relay	1st	Ella Halvarsson
24	2024–25	1 December 2024	(Finland) Kontiolahti	World Cup	Relay	3rd	V. Brandt, Nelin, Ponsiluoma
25	2024–25	15 December 2024	(Austria) Hochfilzen	World Cup	Relay	3rd	V. Brandt, Nelin, Ponsiluoma
26	2024–25	17 January 2025	(Germany) Ruhpolding	World Cup	Relay	2nd	V. Brandt, Nelin, Ponsiluoma
