= Anna Magnusson =

Swedish biathlete (born 1995)

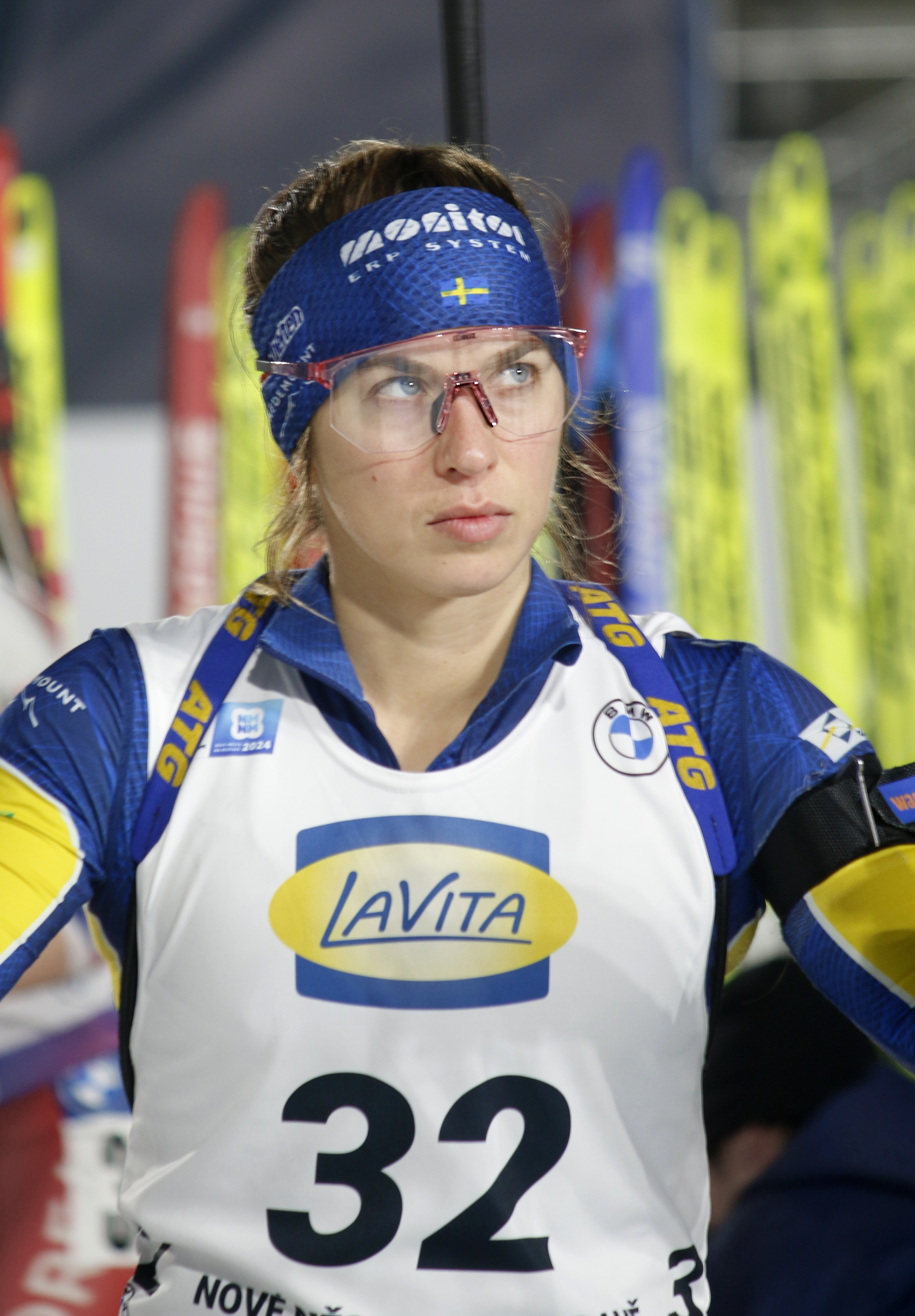
- Anna Magnusson, March 2024

Personal information
- Nationality: Swedish
- Born: 31 March 1995 (age 31) Piteå, Sweden
- Height: 1.53 m (5 ft 0 in)
- Weight: 51 kg (112 lb)

Sport

Professional information
- Sport: Biathlon
- Club: Piteå Skidskytteklubb
- World Cup debut: 7 January 2015 (age 19)

Olympic Games
- Teams: 3 (2018, 2022, 2026)
- Medals: 2 (0 gold)

World Championships
- Teams: 7 (2015–2019, 2023–2025)
- Medals: 4 (0 gold)

World Cup
- Seasons: 11 (2014/15–)
- All races: 222
- Individual victories: 1
- All victories: 5
- Individual podiums: 4
- All podiums: 25
Medal record
Women's biathlon
Representing Sweden
International biathlon competitions
Event	1st	2nd	3rd
Olympic Games	0	2	0
World Championships	0	2	2
European Championships	0	1	0
Junior World Championships	0	1	1
Total	0	6	3
Olympic Games
Silver medal – second place	2018 Pyeongchang	4 × 6 km relay
Silver medal – second place	2026 Milano Cortina	4 × 6 km relay
World Championships
Silver medal – second place	2019 Östersund	4 x 6 km relay
Silver medal – second place	2024 Nové Město	4 × 6 km relay
Bronze medal – third place	2023 Oberhof	4 × 6 km relay
Bronze medal – third place	2025 Lenzerheide	4 × 6 km relay
European Championships
Silver medal – second place	2019 Raubichi	Single mixed relay
Junior World Championships
Silver medal – second place	2016 Cheile Grădiştei	3 × 6 km relay
Bronze medal – third place	2016 Cheile Grădiştei	7.5 km sprint
- Updated on 8 December 2025

Anna Magnusson (born 31 March 1995) is a Swedish female biathlete. She represented Sweden at the 2014 and 2015 junior world championships and at the 2015 World Championships in Kontiolahti.

Together with Linn Persson, Elvira Öberg, and Hanna Öberg, she won her first World Cup competition victory on 11 December 2021 in Hochfilzen. On 16 December 2022, she took her first individual World Cup competition podium place when winning a World Cup sprint competition in Le Grand-Bornand.

== Career ==
She made her debut in the Biathlon World Cup during the 2015–16 season and has been a regular member of the Swedish national team since then. Magnusson won her first World Cup victory in a relay event in December 2021 in Hochfilzen, Austria. She has earned several podium finishes in relay events, including medals at the 2018 Winter Olympics in Pyeongchang (silver in the women's relay) and at the World Championships.

== Personal life ==
Anna Magnusson is in a relationship with her previous teammate Peppe Femling.

== Biathlon results ==
All results are sourced from the International Biathlon Union.

=== Olympic Games ===
2 medals (2 silver)

Event	Individual	Sprint	Pursuit	Mass start	Relay	Mixed relay
(South Korea) 2018 Pyeongchang	37th	—	—	—	Silver	—
(China) 2022 Beijing	—	7th	46th	—	—	—
(Italy) 2026 Milano Cortina	12th	35th	17th	4th	Silver	5th

=== World Championships ===
3 medals (2 silver, 2 bronze)

Event	Individual	Sprint	Pursuit	Mass start	Relay	Mixed relay	Single mixed relay
(Finland) 2015 Kontiolahti	72nd	—	—	—	8th	—	—N/a
(Norway) 2016 Oslo	—	53rd	57th	—	10th	—	—N/a
(Austria) 2017 Hochfilzen	59th	14th	36th	—	6th	6th	—N/a
(Sweden) 2019 Östersund	65th	43rd	11th	—	Silver	—	—
(Germany) 2023 Oberhof	35th	9th	18th	26th	Bronze	—	—
(Czech Republic) 2024 Nové Město na Moravě	25th	20th	19th	26th	Silver	—	—
(Switzerland) 2025 Lenzerheide	28th	20th	7th	19th	Bronze	5th	—

*During Olympic seasons competitions are only held for those events not included in the Olympic program.
**The single mixed relay was added as an event in 2019.

=== World Cup ===
Season	Age	Overall		Individual		Sprint		Pursuit		Mass start	
Season	Age	Points	Position	Points	Position	Points	Position	Points	Position	Points	Position
2015–16	20	1	102nd	1	63rd	–	–	–	–	–	–
2016–17	21	402	23rd	33	34th	162	17th	111	29th	96	19th
2017–18	22	4	94th	–	–	–	–	4	77th	–	–
2018–19	23	57	68th	–	–	–	–	57	41st	–	–
2019–20	24	50	64th	19	44th	29	60th	2	73rd	–	–
2020–21	25	52	63rd	–	–	43	55th	9	67th	–	–
2021–22	26	207	33rd	9	52nd	106	29th	71	32nd	21	39th
2022–23	27	507	14th	63	15th	213	9th	109	19th	122	10th
2023-24	28	426	15th	49	19th	147	14th	141	15th	89	15th
2024-25	29	356	20th	62	14th	82	33rd	97	26th	115	12th
2025-26	30	803	7th	134	2nd	274	7th	259	6th	136	8th

==== Individual podiums ====
- 1 victory – (1 Sp)
- 7 podiums – (4 Sp, 2 Pu, 1 MS)

No.	Season	Date	Location	Level	Race	Place
1	2022–23	16 December 2022	(France) Annecy-Le Grand-Bornand	World Cup	Sprint	1st
2	2022–23	18 March 2023	(Norway) Oslo Holmenkollen	World Cup	Sprint	3rd
3	2025–26	5 December 2025	(Sweden) Östersund	World Cup	Sprint	2nd
4	2025–26	7 December 2025	(Sweden) Östersund	World Cup	Pursuit	3rd
5	2025–26	12 December 2025	(Austria) Hochfilzen	World Cup	Sprint	3rd
6	2025–26	14 December 2025	(Austria) Hochfilzen	World Cup	Pursuit	2nd
7	2025–26	8 March 2026	(Finland) Kontiolahti	World Cup	Mass Start	3rd

==== Team podiums ====
- 6 victories – (6 Relays)
- 29 podiums – (24 Relays, 4 Mixed relays, 1 Single mixed relay)

No.	Season	Date	Location	Level	Race	Place	Teammate(s)
1	2017–18	7 January 2018	(Germany) Oberhof	World Cup	Relay	3rd	Persson, Högberg, Brorsson
2	2017–18	13 January 2018	(Germany) Ruhpolding	World Cup	Relay	3rd	Persson, Brorsson, H. Öberg
3	2017–18	22 February 2018	(South Korea) Pyeongchang	Winter Olympic Games	Relay	2nd	Persson, Brorsson, H. Öberg
4	2018–19	16 March 2019	(Sweden) Östersund	World Championships	Relay	2nd	Persson, Brorsson, H. Öberg
5	2020–21	14 March 2021	(Czech Republic) Nové Město	World Cup	Mixed Relay	3rd	E. Öberg, Nelin, Ponsiluoma
6	2021–22	11 December 2021	(Austria) Hochfilzen	World Cup	Relay	1st	Persson, E. Öberg, H. Öberg
7	2021–22	14 January 2022	(Germany) Ruhpolding	World Cup	Relay	2nd	Skottheim, Nilsson, Brorsson
8	2021–22	3 March 2022	(Finland) Kontiolahti	World Cup	Relay	2nd	Persson, H. Öberg, E. Öberg
9	2022–23	1 December 2022	(Finland) Kontiolahti	World Cup	Relay	1st	Persson, H. Öberg, E. Öberg
10	2022–23	11 December 2022	(Austria) Hochfilzen	World Cup	Relay	2nd	Persson, H. Öberg, E. Öberg
11	2022–23	22 January 2023	(Italy) Antholz-Anterselva	World Cup	Relay	2nd	Persson, H. Öberg, E. Öberg
12	2022–23	18 February 2023	(Germany) Oberhof	World Championships	Relay	3rd	Persson, E. Öberg, H. Öberg
13	2022–23	5 March 2023	(Czech Republic) Nové Město	World Cup	Mixed Relay	2nd	H. Öberg, Ponsiluoma, Samuelsson
14	2023–24	29 November 2023	(Sweden) Östersund	World Cup	Relay	2nd	Persson, H. Öberg, E. Öberg
15	2023–24	10 December 2023	(Austria) Hochfilzen	World Cup	Relay	2nd	Brorsson, H. Öberg, E. Öberg
16	2023–24	7 January 2024	(Germany) Oberhof	World Cup	Relay	3rd	Persson, H. Öberg, E. Öberg
17	2023–24	10 January 2024	(Germany) Ruhpolding	World Cup	Relay	2nd	Persson, Brorsson, E. Öberg
18	2023–24	20 January 2024	(Italy) Antholz-Anterselva	World Cup	Mixed Relay	3rd	E. Öberg, Nelin, Ponsiluoma
19	2023–24	17 February 2024	(Czech Republic) Nové Město	World Championships	Relay	2nd	Persson, H. Öberg, E. Öberg
20	2023–24	3 March 2024	(Norway) Oslo Holmenkollen	World Cup	Single Mixed Relay	2nd	Samuelsson
21	2023–24	9 March 2024	(United States) Soldier Hollow	World Cup	Relay	3rd	Brorsson, H. Öberg, E. Öberg
22	2024–25	30 November 2024	(Finland) Kontiolahti	World Cup	Mixed Relay	3rd	E. Öberg, Nelin, Ponsiluoma
23	2024–25	1 December 2024	(Finland) Kontiolahti	World Cup	Relay	1st	Andersson, H. Öberg, E. Öberg
24	2024–25	15 December 2024	(Austria) Hochfilzen	World Cup	Relay	3rd	Heijdenberg, Halvarsson, E. Öberg
25	2024–25	26 January 2025	(Italy) Antholz	World Cup	Relay	1st	Skottheim, Halvarsson, H. Öberg
26	2024–25	22 February 2025	(Switzerland) Lenzerheide	World Championships	Relay	3rd	Halvarsson, H. Öberg, E. Öberg
27	2025–26	13 December 2025	(Austria) Hochfilzen	World Cup	Relay	1st	Halvarsson, E. Öberg, H. Öberg
28	2025–26	18 February 2026	(Italy) Antholz-Anterselva	Winter Olympic Games	Relay	2nd	Gestblom, E. Öberg, H. Öberg
29	2025–26	8 March 2026	(Finland) Kontiolahti	World Cup	Relay	1st	Gestblom, E. Öberg, H. Öberg
