= Hanna Öberg =

Swedish biathlete (born 1995)

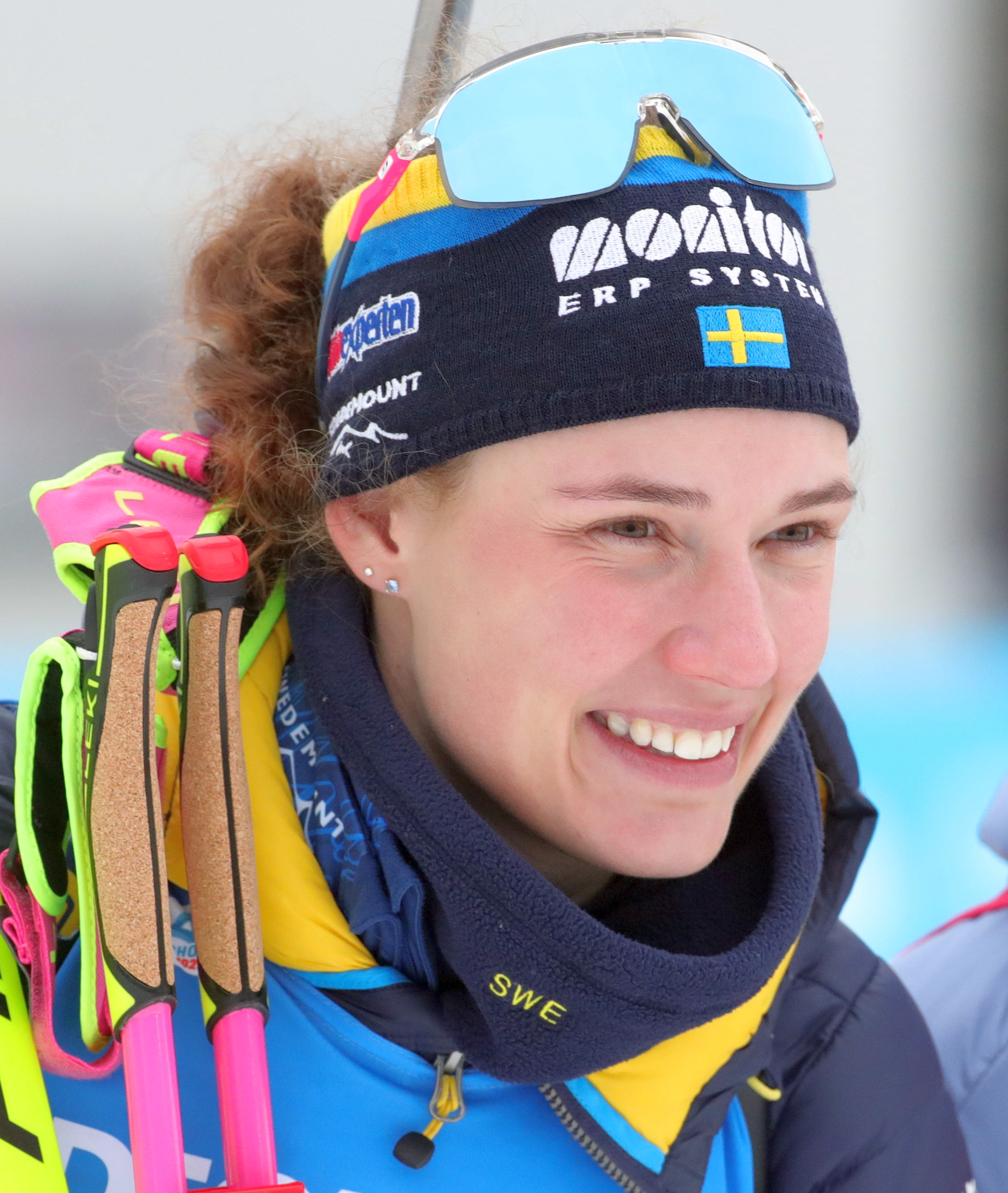
- Öberg in 2023

Personal information
- Nationality: Swedish
- Born: 2 November 1995 (age 30) Kiruna, Sweden
- Height: 1.78 m (5 ft 10 in)
- Weight: 65 kg (143 lb)

Sport

Professional information
- Sport: Biathlon
- Club: Piteå Skidskytteklubb
- World Cup debut: 27 November 2016

Olympic Games
- Teams: 3 (2018, 2022, 2026)
- Medals: 4 (2 gold)

World Championships
- Teams: 7 (2017–2025)
- Medals: 14 (3 gold)

World Cup
- Seasons: 10 (2016/17–)
- All races: 257
- Individual victories: 15
- All victories: 28
- Individual podiums: 42
- All podiums: 83
- Discipline titles: 2: 1 Mass Start (2018–19); 1 Individual (2019–20);
Medal record
Women's biathlon
Representing Sweden
International biathlon competitions
Event	1st	2nd	3rd
Olympic Games	2	2	0
World Championship	3	4	7
Total	5	6	7
Olympic Games
Gold medal – first place	2018 Pyeongchang	15 km individual
Gold medal – first place	2022 Beijing	4 × 6 km relay
Silver medal – second place	2018 Pyeongchang	4 × 6 km relay
Silver medal – second place	2026 Milano Cortina	4 × 6 km relay
World Championships
Gold medal – first place	2019 Östersund	15 km individual
Gold medal – first place	2023 Oberhof	12.5 km mass start
Gold medal – first place	2023 Oberhof	15 km individual
Silver medal – second place	2019 Östersund	4 × 6 km relay
Silver medal – second place	2021 Pokljuka	15 km individual
Silver medal – second place	2023 Oberhof	7.5 km sprint
Silver medal – second place	2024 Nové Město	4 × 6 km relay
Bronze medal – third place	2019 Östersund	Single mixed relay
Bronze medal – third place	2020 Antholz	12.5 km mass start
Bronze medal – third place	2021 Pokljuka	Mixed relay
Bronze medal – third place	2021 Pokljuka	Single mixed relay
Bronze medal – third place	2023 Oberhof	4 × 6 km relay
Bronze medal – third place	2024 Nové Město	Mixed relay
Bronze medal – third place	2025 Lenzerheide	4 × 6 km relay
World Junior Championships
Gold medal – first place	2016 Cheile Grădiştei	7.5 km sprint
Gold medal – first place	2016 Cheile Grădiştei	10 km pursuit
Silver medal – second place	2016 Cheile Grădiştei	3 × 6 km relay
Youth World Championships
Silver medal – second place	2012 Kontiolahti	3 × 6 km relay
European Championships
Gold medal – first place	2019 Raubichi	15 km individual
Bronze medal – third place	2019 Raubichi	7.5 km sprint
- Updated on 8 December 2025

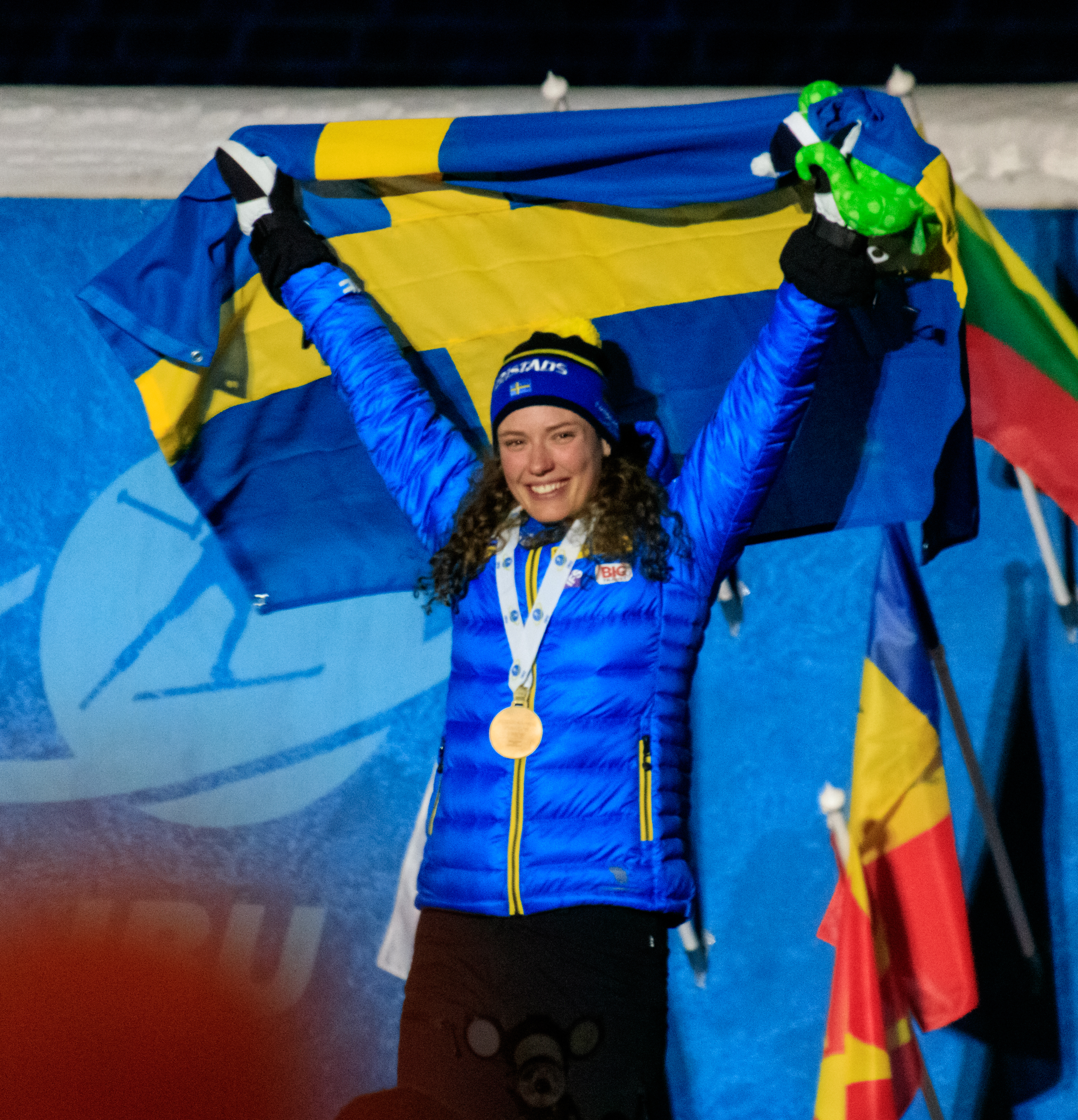
Hanna Öberg with the gold medal at 15 km individual in Östersund 2019

Hanna Linnea Öberg (born 2 November 1995) is a Swedish biathlete who is a double Olympic champion and a three-time world champion. She is the elder sister of fellow biathlete Elvira Öberg.

== Career ==
In 2017 she won the IBU Female Rookie of the Year Award for her World Cup debut season, with the male counterpart being awarded to her fellow Swede Sebastian Samuelsson. At the Pyeongchang 2018 Winter Olympics she won a surprising gold in the Individual, after four clean shootings. It was both the first victory and podium of her career, with her previous best being a fifth place in the world cup. She also claimed silver in the Relay, finished seventh in sprint, and fifth in both the mass start and the pursuit. Öberg repeated her Olympic success at the 2019 Biathlon World Championships on home snow in Östersund, where she again won the individual with a perfect shoot, having previously finished fourth in the sprint and fifth in the pursuit. She became the first female biathlete to win the individual World Championship title the year after taking the Olympic individual gold.

She was awarded the Svenska Dagbladet Gold Medal in early-December 2018. and the Jerring Award in January 2019. In June 2019, it was announced she had been awarded the Victoria Award.

== Biathlon results ==
All results are sourced from the International Biathlon Union.

=== Olympic Games ===
4 medals (2 gold, 2 silver)

Event	Individual	Sprint	Pursuit	Mass start	Relay	Mixed relay
(South Korea) 2018 Pyeongchang	Gold	7th	5th	5th	Silver	11th
(China) 2022 Beijing	16th	19th	18th	25th	Gold	4th
(Italy) 2026 Milano Cortina	41st	18th	8th	10th	Silver	5th

=== World Championships ===
14 medals (3 gold, 4 silver, 7 bronze)

Event	Individual	Sprint	Pursuit	Mass start	Relay	Mixed relay	Single mixed relay
(Austria) 2017 Hochfilzen	55th	40th	49th	—	6th	6th	—N/a
(Sweden) 2019 Östersund	Gold	4th	5th	4th	Silver	5th	Bronze
(Italy) 2020 Antholz	4th	18th	4th	Bronze	5th	11th	4th
(Slovenia) 2021 Pokljuka	Silver	10th	13th	7th	5th	Bronze	Bronze
(Germany) 2023 Oberhof	Gold	Silver	12th	Gold	Bronze	9th	4th
(Czech Republic) 2024 Nové Město	16th	8th	5th	9th	Silver	Bronze	4th
(Switzerland) 2025 Lenzerheide	43rd	19th	11th	30th	Bronze	5th	—

*During Olympic seasons competitions are only held for those events not included in the Olympic program.
**The single mixed relay was added as an event in 2019.

=== World Cup ===
Season	Age	Overall		Individual		Sprint		Pursuit		Mass start	
Season	Age	Points	Position	Points	Position	Points	Position	Points	Position	Points	Position
2016–17	21	131	46th	43	25th	37	55th	51	44th	–	–
2017–18	22	167	38th	16	42nd	74	38th	37	49th	40	31st
2018–19	23	741	5th	94	4th	214	8th	213	7th	220	1st
2019–20	24	741	4th	128	1st	245	5th	168	4th	200	3rd
2020–21	25	826	4th	90	3rd	296	3rd	235	4th	165	7th
2021–22	26	661	4th	–	–	306	3rd	262	3rd	93	14th
2022–23	27	710	7th	153	3rd	198	12th	164	12th	195	3rd
2023–24	28	528	12th	47	21st	139	15th	213	10th	129	9th
2024–25	29	488	12th	122	4th	122	20th	122	15th	122	10th
2025–26	30	958	2nd	125	4th	345	2nd	372	3rd	116	11th

==== Individual podiums ====
36 Medals (11 Gold, 15 Silver, 10 Bronze)

No.	Season	Date	Location	Level	Race	Place
1	2018–19	22 December 2018	(Czech Republic) Nové Město na Moravě	World Cup	Pursuit	3rd
2	2018–19	10 January 2019	(Germany) Oberhof	World Cup	Sprint	3rd
3	2018–19	17 January 2019	(Germany) Ruhpolding	World Cup	Sprint	3rd
4	2018–19	23 March 2019	(Norway) Oslo	World Cup	Pursuit	3rd
5	2018–19	24 March 2019	(Norway) Oslo	World Cup	Mass Start	1st
6	2019–20	15 December 2019	(Austria) Hochfilzen	World Cup	Pursuit	2nd
7	2019–20	15 January 2020	(Germany) Ruhpolding	World Cup	Sprint	2nd
8	2019–20	19 January 2020	(Germany) Ruhpolding	World Cup	Pursuit	3rd
9	2019–20	24 January 2020	(Slovenia) Pokljuka	World Cup	Individual	2nd
10	2019–20	26 January 2020	(Slovenia) Pokljuka	World Cup	Mass Start	1st
11	2019–20	8 March 2020	(Czech Republic) Nové Město na Moravě	World Cup	Mass Start	2nd
12	2020–21	29 November 2020	(Finland) Kontiolahti	World Cup	Sprint	1st
13	2020–21	3 December 2020	(Finland) Kontiolahti	World Cup	Sprint	1st
14	2020–21	6 December 2020	(Finland) Kontiolahti	World Cup	Pursuit	3rd
15	2020–21	19 December 2020	(Austria) Hochfilzen	World Cup	Pursuit	2nd
16	2020–21	8 January 2021	(Germany) Oberhof	World Cup	Sprint	2nd
17	2020–21	17 January 2021	(Germany) Oberhof	World Cup	Mass Start	3rd
18	2020–21	23 January 2021	(Italy) Antholz-Anterselva	World Cup	Mass Start	2nd
19	2021–22	28 November 2021	(Sweden) Östersund	World Cup	Sprint	1st
20	2021–22	18 December 2021	(France) Le Grand-Bornand	World Cup	Pursuit	3rd
21	2021–22	9 January 2022	(Germany) Oberhof	World Cup	Pursuit	2nd
22	2021–22	16 January 2022	(Germany) Ruhpolding	World Cup	Pursuit	3rd
23	2022–23	30 November 2022	(Finland) Kontiolahti	World Cup	Individual	1st
24	2022–23	18 March 2023	(Norway) Oslo	World Cup	Sprint	2nd
25	2022–23	19 March 2023	(Norway) Oslo	World Cup	Mass Start	1st
26	2023–24	17 December 2023	(Switzerland) Lenzerheide	World Cup	Mass Start	2nd
27	2024–25	8 March 2025	(Czech Republic) Nové Město na Moravě	World Cup	Pursuit	2nd
28	2024–25	13 March 2025	(Slovenia) Pokljuka	World Cup	15 km Individual	2nd
29	2025–26	18 December 2025	(France) Annecy–Le Grand-Bornand	World Cup	7.5 km Sprint	1st
30	2025–26	11 January 2026	(Germany) Oberhof	World Cup	Pursuit	3rd
31	2025–26	16 January 2026	(Germany) Ruhpolding	World Cup	Sprint	1st
32	2025–26	18 January 2026	(Germany) Ruhpolding	World Cup	Pursuit	2nd
33	2025–26	5 March 2026	(Finland) Kontiolahti	World Cup	Individual	2nd
34	2025–26	19 March 2026	(Norway) Oslo	World Cup	Sprint	1st
35	2025–26	21 March 2026	(Norway) Oslo	World Cup	Pursuit	1st
36	2025–26	22 March 2026	(Norway) Oslo	World Cup	Mass Start	2nd

==== Team podiums ====
30 Medals (12 Gold, 10 Silver, 8 Bronze)

No.	Season	Date	Location	Level	Race	Place	Teammate(s)
1	2017–18	13 January 2018	(Germany) Ruhpolding	World Cup	Relay	3rd	Linn Persson, Mona Brorsson, Anna Magnusson
2	2018–19	16 December 2018	(Austria) Hochfilzen	World Cup	Relay	2nd	Linn Persson, Mona Brorsson, Emma Nilsson
3	2019–20	30 November 2019	(Sweden) Östersund	World Cup	Single Mixed Relay	1st	Sebastian Samuelsson
4	2019–20	8 December 2019	(Sweden) Östersund	World Cup	Relay	3rd	Linn Persson, Elvira Öberg, Mona Brorsson
5	2019–20	11 January 2020	(Germany) Oberhof	World Cup	Relay	2nd	Elvira Öberg, Linn Persson, Mona Brorsson
6	2020–21	5 December 2020	(Finland) Kontiolahti	World Cup	Relay	1st	Johanna Skottheim, Mona Brorsson, Elvira Öberg
7	2020–21	12 December 2020	(Austria) Hochfilzen	World Cup	Relay	3rd	Johanna Skottheim, Linn Persson, Elvira Öberg
8	2020–21	10 January 2021	(Germany) Oberhof	World Cup	Single Mixed Relay	2nd	Sebastian Samuelsson
9	2020–21	16 January 2021	(Germany) Oberhof	World Cup	Relay	3rd	Mona Brorsson, Linn Persson, Elvira Öberg
10	2020–21	4 March 2021	(Czech Republic) Nové Město na Moravě	World Cup	Relay	1st	Mona Brorsson, Linn Persson, Elvira Öberg
11	2021–22	5 December 2021	(Sweden) Östersund	World Cup	Relay	3rd	Linn Persson, Mona Brorsson, Elvira Öberg
12	2021–22	11 December 2021	(Austria) Hochfilzen	World Cup	Relay	1st	Linn Persson, Anna Magnusson, Elvira Öberg
13	2021–22	3 March 2022	(Finland) Kontiolahti	World Cup	Relay	2nd	Linn Persson, Anna Magnusson, Elvira Öberg
14	2021–22	13 March 2022	(Estonia) Otepää	World Cup	Single Mixed Relay	2nd	Sebastian Samuelsson
15	2022–23	1 December 2022	(Finland) Kontiolahti	World Cup	Relay	1st	Linn Persson, Anna Magnusson, Elvira Öberg
16	2022–23	11 December 2022	(Austria) Hochfilzen	World Cup	Relay	2nd	Linn Persson, Anna Magnusson, Elvira Öberg
17	2022–23	22 January 2023	(Italy) Antholz	World Cup	Relay	2nd	Linn Persson, Anna Magnusson, Elvira Öberg
18	2022–23	5 March 2023	(Czech Republic) Nové Město	World Cup	Mixed Relay	2nd	Anna Magnusson, Martin Ponsiluoma, Sebastian Samuelsson
19	2023–24	24 November 2023	(Sweden) Ostersund	World Cup	Single Mixed Relay	1st	Sebastian Samuelsson
20	2023–24	29 November 2023	(Sweden) Ostersund	World Cup	Relay	2nd	Anna Magnusson, Linn Persson, Elvira Öberg
21	2023–24	10 December 2023	(Austria) Hochfilzen	World Cup	Relay	2nd	Anna Magnusson, Mona Brorsson, Elvira Öberg
22	2023–24	7 January 2024	(Germany) Oberhof	World Cup	Relay	3rd	Anna Magnusson, Linn Persson, Elvira Öberg
23	2023–24	9 March 2024	(United States) Soldier Hollow	World Cup	Relay	3rd	Anna Magnusson, Mona Brorsson, Elvira Öberg
24	2024–25	1 December 2024	(Finland) Kontiolahti	World Cup	Relay	1st	Anna Magnusson, Sara Andersson, Elvira Öberg
25	2024–25	12 January 2025	(Germany) Oberhof	World Cup	Mixed Relay	1st	Sebastian Samuelsson, Martin Ponsiluoma, Elvira Öberg
26	2024–25	26 January 2025	(Italy) Antholz	World Cup	Relay	1st	Johanna Skottheim, Ella Halvarsson, Anna Magnusson
27	2024–25	16 March 2025	(Slovenia) Pokljuka	World Cup	Relay	1st	Anna-Karin Heijdenberg, Martin Ponsiluoma, Sebastian Samuelsson
28	2025–26	13 December 2025	(Austria) Hochfilzen	World Cup	Relay	1st	Ella Halvarsson, Anna Magnusson, Elvira Öberg
29	2025–26	14 January 2026	(Germany) Ruhpolding	World Cup	Relay	3rd	Johanna Skottheim, Linn Gestblom, Elvira Öberg
30	2025–26	8 March 2026	(Finland) Kontiolahti	World Cup	Relay	1st	Linn Gestblom, Anna Magnusson, Elvira Öberg

== Personal life ==
Hanna's younger sister Elvira Öberg is also a biathlete. Elvira won two silver medals at the 2022 Olympic Games in Beijing.

Hanna Öberg was in a relationship with biathlete Jesper Nelin until 2020, and has been in a relationship with the sprint world champion, Martin Ponsiluoma since 2021. She announced her pregnancy in July 2026.

== Sources ==
- "Lyckad OS-debut för Hanna Öberg – tog första topp tio-placeringen för säsongen". Dagens Nyheter (in Swedish). 10 February 2018.
- "Hanna Öberg på femte plats". Norra Skåne (in Swedish). 12 February 2018.
- Kurtoğlu, Özgür (12 February 2018). "Nytt succélopp av Hanna Öberg". Eurosport (in Swedish).

Awards and achievements
Preceded by Sarah Sjöström	Svenska Dagbladet Gold Medal; 2018	Succeeded by Tove Alexandersson
