= Jesper Nelin =

Swedish biathlete (born 1992)

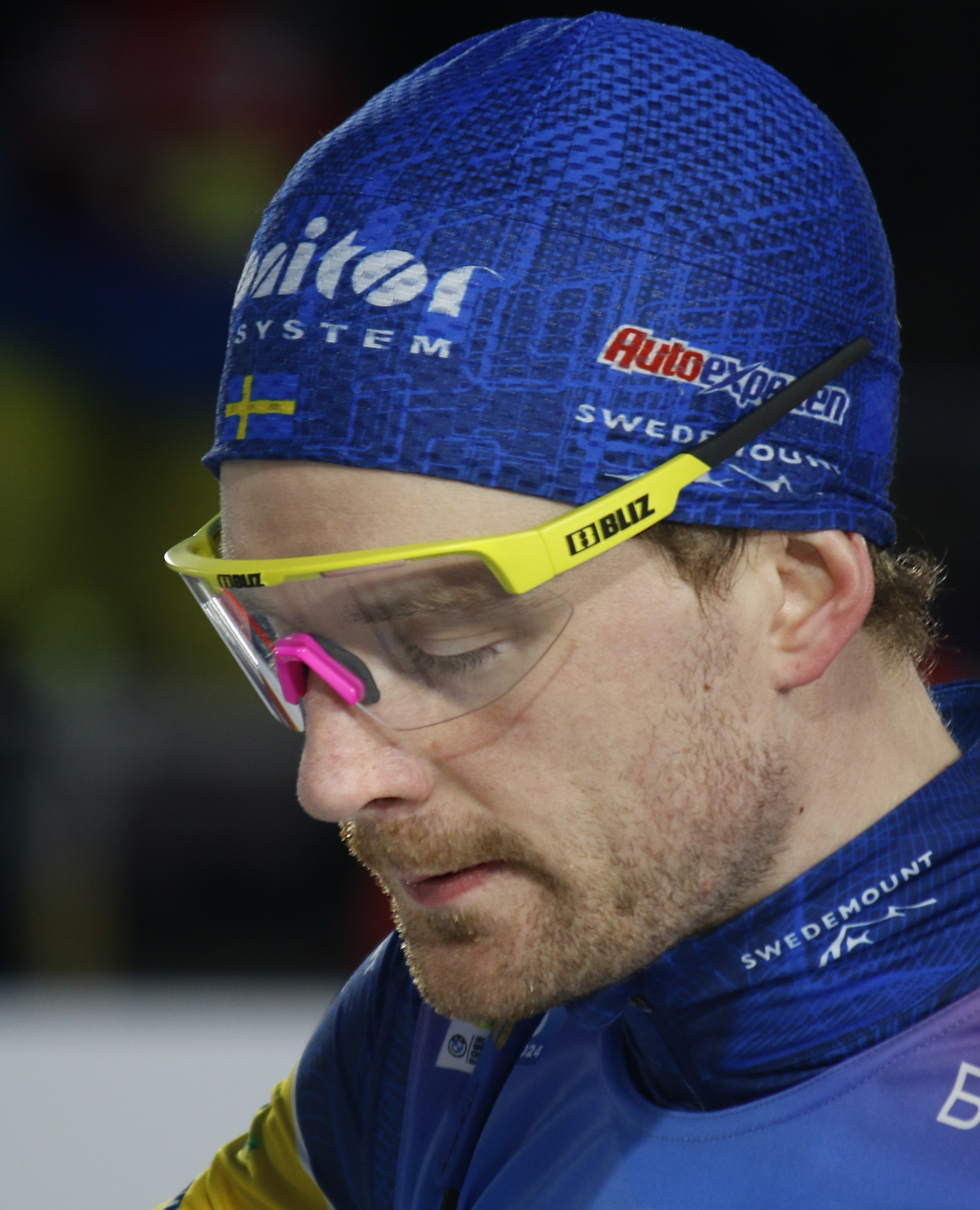
- Nelin in 2024

Personal information
- Nationality: Swedish
- Born: 3 October 1992 (age 33) Värnamo, Sweden
- Height: 1.77 m (5 ft 10 in)
- Weight: 73 kg (161 lb)

Sport

Professional information
- Sport: Biathlon
- Club: Piteå skidskytteklubb
- World Cup debut: 2015

Olympic Games
- Teams: 3 (2018, 2022, 2026)
- Medals: 2 (1 gold)

World Championships
- Teams: 8 (2015, 2016, 2019–2025)
- Medals: 3 (1 gold)

World Cup
- Seasons: 10 (2015/16–)
- Individual victories: 0
- All victories: 2
- Individual podiums: 1
- All podiums: 17
- Overall titles: 0
- Discipline titles: 0
Medal record
Men's biathlon
Representing Sweden
International biathlon competitions
Event	1st	2nd	3rd
Olympic Games	1	0	1
World Championships	1	1	1
Total	2	1	2
Olympic Games
Gold medal – first place	2018 Pyeongchang	4 × 7.5 km relay
Bronze medal – third place	2026 Milano Cortina	4 × 7.5 km relay
World Championships
Gold medal – first place	2024 Nové Město	4 × 7.5 km relay
Silver medal – second place	2021 Pokljuka	4 × 7.5 km relay
Bronze medal – third place	2023 Oberhof	4 × 7.5 km relay
European Championships
Silver medal – second place	2019 Raubichi	Sprint
Silver medal – second place	2019 Raubichi	Single Mixed Relay

Jesper Nelin (born 3 October 1992) is a Swedish biathlete and Olympic gold medalist in men's relay. He made his World Cup debut in December 2015 and competed in his first World Championships in Oslo 2016. He represented Sweden at the 2018, 2022 and 2026 Winter Olympics.

His Olympic results include winning a gold medal in the biathlon relay in 2018 with the Swedish team, along with Peppe Femling, Sebastian Samuelsson, and Fredrik Lindström.

== Career ==
Jesper Nelin made his World Cup debut during the 2015–16 season. Over the years, he has steadily improved his results, particularly in relay races. His breakthrough performance came in the 2017–18 season when he secured a silver medal in the mixed relay at the Winter Olympics in PyeongChang, South Korea, where he contributed to Sweden’s success in the event.

In the World Cup, Nelin has been part of several relay teams that have earned podium finishes, including victories in the World Cup relay events. He has also competed in individual events, earning competitive results, and has contributed to Sweden's strong showing in biathlon relay disciplines.

== Biathlon results ==
=== Olympic results ===
1 medal (1 gold)

Event	Individual	Sprint	Pursuit	Mass start	Relay	Mixed relay
(South Korea) 2018 Pyeongchang	24th	30th	18th	9th	Gold	11th
(China) 2022 Beijing	64th	55th	31st	—N/a	5th	—N/a
(Italy) 2026 Milano Cortina	12th	72nd	—N/a	26th	Bronze	—N/a

=== World Championships ===
3 medals (1 gold, 1 silver, 1 bronze)

Event	Individual	Sprint	Pursuit	Mass start	Relay	Mixed relay	Single mixed relay
(Norway) 2016 Oslo-Holmenkollen	54th	31st	38th	—N/a	7th	12th	—N/a
(Austria) 2017 Hochfilzen	54th	59th	44th	—N/a	11th	6th	—N/a
(Sweden) 2019 Östersund	28th	41st	33rd	—N/a	7th	5th	—N/a
(Italy) 2020 Antholz	42nd	19th	11th	19th	10th	11th	—N/a
(Slovenia) 2021 Pokljuka	82nd	17th	28th	27th	Silver	—N/a	—N/a
(Germany) 2023 Oberhof	22nd	45th	23rd	16th	Bronze	—N/a	—N/a
(Czech Republic) 2024 Nové Město	33rd	23rd	41st	—N/a	Gold	—N/a	—N/a
(Switzerland) 2025 Lenzerheide	14th	14th	11th	10th	4th	—N/a	—N/a

*During Olympic seasons, competitions are only held for those events not included in the Olympic program.

=== World Cup ===
==== Individual podiums ====
- 1 podium (1 MS)

No.	Season	Date	Location	Level	Race	Place
1	2023–24	2 March 2024	(Norway) Oslo-Holmenkollen	World Cup	Mass Start	3rd

==== Relay podiums ====
- 4 victories
- 20 podiums

No.	Season	Date	Location	Level	Race	Place	Teammate(s)
1	2017–18	7 January 2018	(Germany) Oberhof	World Cup	Relay	1st	Ponsiluoma, Samuelsson, Lindström
2	2017–18	23 February 2018	(South Korea) Pyeongchang	Winter Olympics	Relay	1st	Femling, Samuelsson, Lindström
3	2019–20	30 November 2019	(Sweden) Östersund	World Cup	Mixed Relay	3rd	Persson, Brorsson, Ponsiluoma
4	2019–20	7 March 2020	(Czech Republic) Nové Město na Morave	World Cup	Relay	3rd	Samuelsson, Femling, Ponsiluoma
5	2020–21	6 December 2020	(Finland) Kontiolahti	World Cup	Relay	2nd	Femling, Ponsiluoma, Samuelsson
6	2020–21	13 December 2020	(Austria) Hochfilzen	World Cup	Relay	1st	Femling, Ponsiluoma, Samuelsson
7	2020–21	20 February 2021	(Slovenia) Pokljuka	World Championships	Relay	2nd	Femling, Ponsiluoma, Samuelsson
8	2020–21	14 March 2021	(Czech Republic) Nové Město na Morave	World Cup	Mixed Relay	3rd	E. Öberg, Magnusson, Ponsiluoma
9	2021–22	4 March 2022	(Finland) Kontiolahti	World Cup	Relay	2nd	Femling, Ponsiluoma, Samuelsson
10	2021–22	13 March 2022	(Estonia) Otepää	World Cup	Mixed Relay	2nd	Ponsiluoma, Persson, E. Öberg
11	2022–23	10 December 2022	(Austria) Hochfilzen	World Cup	Relay	2nd	Ponsiluoma, Femling, Samuelsson
12	2022–23	8 January 2023	(Slovenia) Pokljuka	World Cup	Mixed Relay	3rd	Ponsiluoma, Brorsson, E. Öberg
13	2022–23	18 February 2023	(Germany) Oberhof	World Championships	Relay	3rd	Femling, Ponsiluoma, Samuelsson
14	2023–24	20 January 2024	(Italy) Antholz-Anterselva	World Cup	Mixed Relay	3rd	Magnusson, E. Öberg, Ponsiluoma
15	2023–24	17 February 2024	(Czech Republic) Nové Město na Morave	World Championships	Relay	1st	Brandt, Ponsiluoma, Samuelsson
16	2023–24	3 March 2024	(Norway) Oslo Holmenkollen	World Cup	Mixed Relay	2nd	Brorsson, E. Öberg, Ponsiluoma
17	2024–25	30 November 2024	(Finland) Kontiolahti	World Cup	Mixed Relay	3rd	Magnusson, E. Öberg, Ponsiluoma
18	2024–25	1 December 2024	(Finland) Kontiolahti	World Cup	Relay	3rd	Brandt, Ponsiluoma, Samuelsson
19	2024–25	15 December 2024	(Austria) Hochfilzen	World Cup	Relay	3rd	Brandt, Ponsiluoma, Samuelsson
20	2024–25	17 January 2025	(Germany) Ruhpolding	World Cup	Relay	2nd	Brandt, Ponsiluoma, Samuelsson
