= Biathlon at the Winter World University Games =

- Events: 10 (men: 5; women: 5)

Games
- 1959; 1960; 1961; 1962; 1963; 1964; 1965; 1966; 1967; 1968; 1970; 1970; 1973; 1972; 1975; 1975; 1977; 1978; 1979; 1981; 1983; 1985; 1987; 1989; 1991; 1993; 1995; 1997; 1999; 2001; 2003; 2005; 2007; 2009; 2011; 2013; 2015; 2017; 2019; 2023; 2025

Biathlon events have been contested at the Universiade as an optional sport in 1983, 1989 and 1993, becoming a compulsory sport after 1997.

== Editions ==
| Games | Year | Host city | Host country | Winner | Second | Third |
|---|---|---|---|---|---|---|
| XI | 1983 | Borovets | Bulgaria | Soviet Union | Romania | Bulgaria |
| XIV | 1989 | Borovets | Bulgaria | Soviet Union | Czechoslovakia | Bulgaria |
| XVI | 1993 | Kościelisko | Poland | Russia | China | Belarus |
| XVIII | 1997 | Muju Resort | South Korea | Russia | France | Czech Republic |
| XIX | 1999 | Osrblie | Slovakia | Slovakia | Poland | Russia |
| XX | 2001 | Kościelisko | Poland | Russia | Poland | Belarus |
| XXI | 2003 | Forni Avoltri | Italy | Ukraine | Russia | Belarus |
| XXII | 2005 | Seefeld in Tirol | Austria | Russia | Ukraine | Poland |
| XXIII | 2007 | Cesana San Sicario | Italy | Belarus | Ukraine | Russia |
| XXIV | 2009 | Yabuli | China | Russia | Ukraine | China |
| XV | 2011 | Erzurum | Turkey | Ukraine | Russia | Bulgaria |
| XXVI | 2013 | Tesero | Italy | Russia | Poland | Ukraine |
| XXVII | 2015 | Osrblie | Slovakia | Russia | Ukraine | Czech Republic/Slovakia |
| XXVIII | 2017 | Alatau | Kazakhstan | Russia | Kazakhstan | France |
| XXIX | 2019 | Krasnoyarsk | Russia | Russia | Norway | Czech Republic |
| XXX | 2023 | Lake Placid | United States | Kazakhstan | Canada | Czech Republic |
| XXXI | 2025 | Pragelato | Italy | Ukraine | Poland | France |
| XXXII | 2027 | Changchun | China | | | |

== Events ==
| Event | 83 | 89 | 93 | 97 | 99 | 01 | 03 | 05 | 07 | 09 | 11 | 13 | 15 | 17 | 19 | 23 | 25 | Years |
|---|---|---|---|---|---|---|---|---|---|---|---|---|---|---|---|---|---|---|
| Men's individual 20 km | • | • | • | • | • | • | • | • | • | • | • | • | • | • | • | | | 15 |
| Men's individual 15 km | | | | | | | | | | | | | | | | • | • | 2 |
| Men's sprint 10 km | • | • | • | • | • | • | • | • | • | • | • | • | • | • | • | • | • | 17 |
| Men's pursuit 12,5 km | | | | | • | • | • | • | • | • | • | • | • | • | • | • | • | 13 |
| Men's mass start 15 km | | | | | | | • | • | • | • | • | • | • | • | • | • | • | 11 |
| Men's relay 4 x 7,5 km | • | • | • | • | • | • | • | • | • | | | | | | | | | 9 |
| Women's individual 15 km | | • | • | • | • | • | • | • | • | • | • | • | • | • | • | | | 14 |
| Women's individual 12.5 km | | | | | | | | | | | | | | | | • | • | 2 |
| Women's sprint 7,5 km | | • | • | • | • | • | • | • | • | • | • | • | • | • | • | • | • | 16 |
| Women's pursuit 10 km | | | | | • | • | • | • | • | • | • | • | • | • | • | • | • | 13 |
| Women's mass start 12,5 km | | | | | | | • | • | • | • | • | • | • | • | • | • | • | 11 |
| Women's relay 4 x 6 km | | • | • | • | • | • | • | • | • | | | | | | | | | 8 |
| Mixed 2 x 6 km / 2 x 7,5 km | | | | | | | | | | • | • | • | • | • | • | • | | 6 |
| Single mixed relay | | | | | | | | | | | | | | | | | • | 1 |

== Medalists ==
=== Men ===
==== Individual 15 km ====
| Year | Gold | Silver | Bronze |
|---|---|---|---|
| 2023 | (Kazakhstan) Vadim Kurales | (Norway) Ørjan Moseng | (France) Axel Garnier |
| 2025 | (Ukraine) Bohdan Borkovskyi | (Finland) Patrik Kuuttinen | (Czech Republic) Petr Hák |

==== Individual 20 km ====
| Year | Gold | Silver | Bronze |
|---|---|---|---|
| 1983 | (Soviet Union) Taras Dolny | (Soviet Union) Andrei Nepein | (Soviet Union) Leonid Novikov |
| 1985–1987 | not included in the program | | |
| 1989 | (Czechoslovakia) Jan Matouš | (Soviet Union) Leonid Reztsov | (Soviet Union) Gennady Karpinkin |
| 1991 | not included in the program | | |
| 1993 | (Russia) Pavel Mouslimov | (France) Franck Perrot | (China) Tan Hongbin |
| 1995 | not included in the program | | |
| 1997 | (Czech Republic) Marian Málek | (Austria) Guenther Beck | (Russia) Andrey Ovcharenko |
| 1999 | (Russia) Vladimir Beresnev | (Poland) Tomasz Sikora | (Slovakia) Marek Matiaško |
| 2001 | (Poland) Tomasz Sikora | (Russia) Victor Gain | (Belarus) Roustam Valioulin |
| 2003 | (Ukraine) Olexander Bilanenko | (Slovakia) Pavol Hurajt | (Ukraine) Alexei Korobeinikov |
| 2005 | (Ukraine) Olexander Bilanenko | (Belarus) Alexandr Syman | (Slovakia) Pavol Hurajt |
| 2007 | (Belarus) Sergei Novikov | (Ukraine) Serhiy Sednev | (Ukraine) Roman Pryma |
| 2009 | (Russia) Artem Gusev | (France) Remy Borgeot | (Ukraine) Serhiy Semenov |
| 2011 | (Russia) Alexey Trustov | (Bulgaria) Krasimir Anev | (Slovakia) Matej Kazar |
| 2013 | (Russia) Sergei Kliachin | (Russia) Aleksandr Mingalev | (Serbia) Milanko Petrović |
| 2015 | (Ukraine) Dmytro Rusinov | (Russia) Vadim Filimonov | (Russia) Yuri Shopin |
| 2017 | (France) Baptiste Jouty | (Russia) Sergei Korastylev | (Russia) Semyon Suchilov |
| 2019 | (Russia) Nikita Porshnev | (Russia) Semyon Suchilov | (France) Félix Cottet-Puinel |

==== Sprint 10 km ====
| Year | Gold | Silver | Bronze |
|---|---|---|---|
| 1983 | (Soviet Union) Taras Dolny | (Soviet Union) Leonid Novikov | (Soviet Union) Andrei Nepein |
| 1985–1987 | not included in the program | | |
| 1989 | (Czechoslovakia) Jan Matouš | (Soviet Union) Konstantin Vaigin | (Soviet Union) Gennady Karpinkin |
| 1991 | not included in the program | | |
| 1993 | (France) Franck Perrot | (Belarus) Gennady Karpinkin | (Belarus) Nicolai Dobrokhvalov |
| 1995 | not included in the program | | |
| 1997 | (France) Franck Perrot | (Russia) Anton Kalinin | (Austria) Guenther Beck |
| 1999 | (Poland) Tomasz Sikora | (Russia) Andrei Prokounin | (Russia) Vladimir Beresnev |
| 2001 | (Poland) Tomasz Sikora | (Belarus) Roustam Valioulin | (Belarus) Sergei Novikov |
| 2003 | (Ukraine) Andriy Deryzemlya | (Russia) Filipp Shulman | (Russia) Vladimir Berestnev |
| 2005 | (Russia) Andrei Makoveev | (Ukraine) Olexander Bilanenko | (Belarus) Alexandr Syman |
| 2007 | (Belarus) Sergei Novikov | (Russia) Sergei Tarasov | (Ukraine) Serhiy Sednev |
| 2009 | (Russia) Artem Gusev | (Ukraine) Oleg Berezhnoy | (Czech Republic) Jaroslav Soukup |
| 2011 | (Ukraine) Artem Pryma | (Ukraine) Sergii Semenov | (Russia) Evgeniy Garanichev |
| 2013 | (Serbia) Milanko Petrović | (Ukraine) Vitaliy Kilchytskyy | (Ukraine) Dmytro Pidruchnyi |
| 2015 | (Russia) Yaroslav Ivanov | (Russia) Maksim Burtasov | (Russia) Yuri Shopin |
| 2017 | (Russia) Semyon Suchilov | (Russia) Dmitry Ivanov | (Kazakhstan) Roman Yeryomin |
| 2019 | (Russia) Eduard Latypov | (Russia) Dmitry Ivanov | (Russia) Nikita Porshnev |
| 2023 | (Kazakhstan) Bekentay Turlubekov | (United States) Bjorn Westervelt | (Kazakhstan) Alexandr Mukhin |

==== Pursuit 12,5 km ====
| Year | Gold | Silver | Bronze |
|---|---|---|---|
| 1985–1997 | not included in the program | | |
| 1999 | (Poland) Tomasz Sikora | (Russia) Vladimir Beresnev | (Belarus) Aliaksandr Syman |
| 2001 | (Poland) Tomasz Sikora | (Austria) Guenther Beck | (Slovakia) Pavol Hurajt |
| 2003 | (Ukraine) Vyacheslav Derkach | (Ukraine) Alexei Korobeinikov | (Ukraine) Andriy Deryzemlya |
| 2005 | (Russia) Andrei Makoveev | (Ukraine) Andriy Deryzemlya | (Ukraine) Olexander Bilanenko |
| 2007 | (Russia) Andrei Makoveev | (Czech Republic) Jaroslav Soukup | (Russia) Sergei Tarasov |
| 2009 | (Ukraine) Oleg Berezhnoy | (Russia) Artem Gusev | (Czech Republic) Jaroslav Soukup |
| 2011 | (Ukraine) Sergii Semenov | (Ukraine) Artem Pryma | (Russia) Evgeniy Garanichev |
| 2013 | (Russia) Aleksandr Pechenkin | (Russia) Sergei Kliachin | (Australia) Alexei Almoukov |
| 2015 | (Russia) Yuri Shopin | (Russia) Yaroslav Ivanov | (Russia) Maksim Burtasov |
| 2017 | (Russia) Sergey Korastylev | (Russia) Dmitry Ivanov | (Russia) Semen Suchilov |
| 2019 | (Russia) Dmitry Ivanov | (Russia) Eduard Latypov | (Russia) Nikita Porshnev |
| 2023 | (United States) Bjorn Westervelt | (Ukraine) Dmytrii Hrushchak | (Poland) Wojciech Janik |
| 2023 | (Ukraine) Bohdan Borkovskyi | (Ukraine) Serhii Suprun | (France) Paul Fontaine |

==== Mass start 15 km ====
| Year | Gold | Silver | Bronze |
|---|---|---|---|
| 1983–2001 | not included in the program | | |
| 2003 | (Ukraine) Andriy Deryzemlya | (Ukraine) Vyacheslav Derkach | (Russia) Vladimir Berestnev |
| 2005 | (Russia) Mikhail Kochkin | (Ukraine) Roman Pryma | (Czech Republic) Jaroslav Soukup |
| 2007 | (Russia) Andrei Makoveev | (Ukraine) Oleg Berezhnoy | (Ukraine) Serhiy Sednev |
| 2009 | (Czech Republic) Jaroslav Soukup | (Russia) Alexey Trustov | (Russia) Artem Gusev |
| 2011 | (Ukraine) Roman Pryma | (Bulgaria) Krasimir Anev | (Russia) Alexey Trustov |
| 2013 | (Ukraine) Dmytro Pidruchnyi | (Czech Republic) Tomáš Krupčík | (Russia) Dmitrii Elkhin |
| 2015 | (Ukraine) Vitaliy Kilchytskyy | (Ukraine) Dmytro Rusinov | (Russia) Yuri Shopin |
| 2017 | (France) Baptiste Jouty | (Kazakhstan) Roman Yeryomin | (Kazakhstan) Anton Pantov |
| 2019 | (Norway) Espen Uldal | (Belarus) Maksim Varabei | (Czech Republic) Adam Václavík |
| 2023 | (France) Axel Garnier | (Kazakhstan) Alexandr Mukhin | (Norway) Ørjan Moseng |

==== Relay 4 x 7,5 km ====
| Year | Gold | Silver | Bronze |
|---|---|---|---|
| 1983 | Soviet Union | Romania | Bulgaria |
| 1985–1987 | not included in the program | | |
| 1989 | Soviet Union | Bulgaria | China |
| 1991 | not included in the program | | |
| 1993 | Belarus | Russia | China |
| 1995 | not included in the program | | |
| 1997 | Russia | Ukraine | Czech Republic |
| 1999 | Russia | Ukraine | Belarus |
| 2001 | Belarus | Russia | Poland |
| 2003 | Russia | Belarus | Ukraine |
| 2005 | Russia | Ukraine | Slovakia |
| 2007 | Belarus | Ukraine | Russia |
| 2009–2023 | not included in the program | | |

=== Women ===
==== Individual 15 km ====
| Year | Gold | Silver | Bronze |
|---|---|---|---|
| 1983–1987 | not included in the program | | |
| 1989 | (Bulgaria) Maria Manolova | (Soviet Union) Elena Batsevich | (China) Wang Jingge |
| 1991 | not included in the program | | |
| 1993 | (Russia) Elena Doumnova | (Poland) Agata Suszka | (Russia) Alla Elsoukova |
| 1995 | not included in the program | | |
| 1997 | (Russia) Elena Maslova | (France) Emmanuelle Termier | (United States) Rachel Steer |
| 1999 | (Slovakia) Martina Schwarzbacherova | (Poland) Adriana Babik | (Ukraine) Oksana Khvostenko |
| 2001 | (Slovakia) Martina Schwarzbacherova | (France) Celine Drezet | (Belarus) Olga Nazarova |
| 2003 | (Belarus) Ksenia Zikounkova | (Belarus) Olga Nazarova | (Russia) Marina Bortchoukova |
| 2005 | (Russia) Yekaterina Yuryeva | (Ukraine) Oksana Yakovleva | (Russia) Natalya Burdyga |
| 2007 | (Ukraine) Oksana Yakovleva | (Belarus) Nadezhda Skardino | (Ukraine) Vita Semerenko |
| 2009 | (Russia) Anna Kunaeva | (Russia) Nadezhda Chastina | (Germany) Franziska Hildebrand |
| 2011 | (Russia) Daria Virolaynen | (Germany) Franziska Hildebrand | (Belarus) Darya Yurkevich |
| 2013 | (Slovakia) Natalia Prekopova | (Poland) Weronika Nowakowska-Ziemniak | (Czech Republic) Jitka Landová |
| 2015 | (Kazakhstan) Alina Raikova | (Russia) Ekaterina Avvakumova | (Slovakia) Paulína Fialková |
| 2017 | (Kazakhstan) Alina Raikova | (Kazakhstan) Galina Vishnevskaya | (Ukraine) Nadiia Bielkina |
| 2019 | (Russia) Natalia Gerbulova | (Russia) Ekaterina Moshkova | (Russia) Elena Chirkova |
| 2023-present | not included in the program | | |

==== Sprint 7,5 km ====
| Year | Gold | Silver | Bronze |
|---|---|---|---|
| 1983–1987 | not included in the program | | |
| 1989 | (Soviet Union) Louisa Cherepanova | (Soviet Union) Natalia Ivanova | (China) Song Aiqin |
| 1991 | not included in the program | | |
| 1993 | (China) Wang Jinfen | (Russia) Elena Doumnova | (China) Wang Jinping |
| 1995 | not included in the program | | |
| 1997 | (Russia) Elena Maslova | (United States) Rachel Steer | (Czech Republic) Kamila Horáková |
| 1999 | (Slovakia) Martina Schwarzbacherová | (Slovakia) Marcela Pavkovčeková | (Slovakia) Soňa Mihoková |
| 2001 | (Russia) Irina Malguina | (Russia) Olga Zaitseva | (Belarus) Iryna Tananaika |
| 2003 | (Belarus) Olga Nazarova | (Russia) Tatiana Moiseeva | (Russia) Natalya Burdyga |
| 2005 | (Poland) Magdalena Gwizdoń | (Ukraine) Oksana Khvostenko | (Russia) Natalya Burdyga |
| 2007 | (Belarus) Darya Domracheva | (Ukraine) Valj Semerenko | (Ukraine) Vita Semerenko |
| 2009 | (Russia) Nadezhda Chastina | (Russia) Marina Korovina | (Poland) Agnieszka Grzybek |
| 2011 | (Ukraine) Vita Semerenko | (Russia) Evgeniya Sedova | (Bulgaria) Emilia Yordanova |
| 2013 | (Poland) Weronika Nowakowska-Ziemniak | (Poland) Monika Hojnisz | (Russia) Tatiana Semenova |
| 2015 | (Slovakia) Paulina Fialkova | (Russia) Evgeniya Pavlova | (Czech Republic) Jitka Landová |
| 2017 | (Kazakhstan) Galina Vishnevskaya | (Ukraine) Iana Bondar | (Russia) Anastasiya Egorova |
| 2019 | (Russia) Ekaterina Moshkova | (Russia) Irina Kazakevich | (Russia) Tamara Voronina |
| 2023 | (Poland) Anna Nędza-Kubiniec | (Canada) Shilo Rousseau | (Czech Republic) Tereza Jandová |

==== Pursuit 10 km ====
| Year | Gold | Silver | Bronze |
|---|---|---|---|
| 1985–1997 | not included in the program | | |
| 1999 | (Poland) Agata Suszka | (Slovakia) Martina Schwarzbacherová | (Slovakia) Anna Murínová |
| 2001 | (Russia) Irina Malguina | (Slovakia) Martina Schwarzbacherová | (Russia) Olga Zaitseva |
| 2003 | (Ukraine) Oksana Khvostenko | (Russia) Joulia Makarova | (Czech Republic) Radka Doskočilová |
| 2005 | (Poland) Magdalena Gwizdoń | (Ukraine) Oksana Khvostenko | (Russia) Natalya Burdyga |
| 2007 | (Ukraine) Vita Semerenko | (Ukraine) Valj Semerenko | (Belarus) Ludmilla Kolinchik |
| 2009 | (Russia) Anna Kunaeva | (China) Liu Yuan-Yuan | (Poland) Weronika Nowakowska-Ziemniak |
| 2011 | (Ukraine) Vita Semerenko | (Russia) Daria Virolaynen | (Russia) Evgeniya Sedova |
| 2013 | (Poland) Weronika Nowakowska-Ziemniak | (Poland) Monika Hojnisz | (Russia) Tatiana Semenova |
| 2015 | (Russia) Evgeniya Pavlova | (Slovakia) Paulína Fialková | (Russia) Kristina Smirnova |
| 2017 | (Ukraine) Nadiia Bielkina | (Russia) Olga Shesterikova | (Russia) Larissa Kuklina |
| 2019 | (Russia) Ekaterina Moshkova | (Russia) Irina Kazakevich | (Russia) Tamara Voronina |
| 2023 | (Canada) Shilo Rousseau | (Poland) Anna Nędza-Kubiniec | (Poland) Barbara Skrobiszewska |
| 2025 | (Poland) Barbara Skrobiszewska | (Poland) Amelia Liszka | (Ukraine) Daryna Chalyk |

==== 12.5 km short individual ====
| Year | Gold | Silver | Bronze |
|---|---|---|---|
| 2023 | (Poland) Anna Nędza-Kubiniec | (Canada) Shilo Rousseau | (Czech Republic) Tereza Jandová |
| 2025 | (France) Noemie Remonnay | (Poland) Amelia Liszka | (Ukraine) Daryna Chalyk |

==== Mass start 12,5 km ====
| Year | Gold | Silver | Bronze |
|---|---|---|---|
| 1983–2001 | not included in the program | | |
| 2003 | (Ukraine) Oksana Khvostenko | (Russia) Tatiana Moiseeva | (Russia) Raisa Matveeva |
| 2005 | (Ukraine) Oksana Khvostenko | (Belarus) Liudmila Ananka | (Belarus) Ksenia Zikunkova |
| 2007 | (Belarus) Nadezhda Skardino | (Russia) Nadezhda Kolesnikova | (Ukraine) Valj Semerenko |
| 2009 | (China) Song Chaoqing | (Russia) Anna Sorokina | (Russia) Nadezhda Chastina |
| 2011 | (Russia) Maria Sadilova | (Russia) Anna Kunaeva | (Germany) Franziska Hildebrand |
| 2013 | (Czech Republic) Jitka Landová | (Poland) Weronika Nowakowska-Ziemniak | (Ukraine) Iryna Varvynets |
| 2015 | (Czech Republic) Jitka Landová | (Czech Republic) Eva Puskarčíková | (Ukraine) Iana Bondar |
| 2017 | (Kazakhstan) Galina Vishnevskaya | (Ukraine) Iana Bondar | (Russia) Larisa Kuklina |
| 2019 | (Russia) Ekaterina Moshkova | (Russia) Elizaveta Kaplina | (Russia) Elena Chirkova |
| 2023 | (Czech Republic) Kristýna Otcovská | (France) Pauline Machut | (France) Anna Blanc |

==== Relay 4 x 6 km ====
| Year | Gold | Silver | Bronze |
|---|---|---|---|
| 1983–1987 | not included in the program | | |
| 1989 | Soviet Union | Czechoslovakia | China |
| 1991 | not included in the program | | |
| 1993 | Russia | China | Finland |
| 1995 | not included in the program | | |
| 1997 | Russia | Ukraine | Czech Republic |
| 1999 | Slovakia | Russia | Poland |
| 2001 | Russia | Belarus | Ukraine |
| 2003 | Russia | Ukraine | Belarus |
| 2005 | Ukraine | Belarus | Russia |
| 2007 | Belarus | Ukraine | Russia |
| 2009–2023 | not included in the program | | |

=== Mixed ===
==== Relay 2 x 6 km / 2 x 7,5 km ====
| Year | Gold | Silver | Bronze |
|---|---|---|---|
| 1983–2017 | not included in the program | | |
| 2009 | Russia | France | Ukraine |
| 2011 | Ukraine | Russia | Bulgaria |
| 2013 | Russia | Ukraine | Czech Republic |
| 2015 | Russia | Kazakhstan | Ukraine |
| 2017 | Russia | Kazakhstan | Ukraine |
| 2019 | Russia | Czech Republic | France |
| 2023 | not included in the program | | |

==== Single mixed relay ====
| Year | Gold | Silver | Bronze |
| 1983–2019 | not included in the program | | |
| 2023 | Czech Republic | France | Ukraine |
| 2025 | Ukraine | Czech Republic | Poland |

== Medal table ==
Last updated after the 2025 Winter World University Games

| Rank | Nation | Gold | Silver | Bronze | Total |
|---|---|---|---|---|---|
| 1 | Russia (RUS) | 50 | 41 | 38 | 129 |
| 2 | Ukraine (UKR) | 26 | 32 | 26 | 84 |
| 3 | Poland (POL) | 12 | 11 | 7 | 30 |
| 4 | Belarus (BLR) | 10 | 11 | 13 | 34 |
| 5 | France (FRA) | 7 | 7 | 5 | 19 |
| 6 | Kazakhstan (KAZ) | 7 | 5 | 5 | 17 |
| 7 | Soviet Union (URS) | 6 | 6 | 4 | 16 |
| 8 | Slovakia (SVK) | 6 | 5 | 8 | 19 |
| 9 | Czech Republic (CZE) | 5 | 5 | 15 | 25 |
| 10 | Czechoslovakia (TCH) | 3 | 1 | 0 | 4 |
| 11 | China (CHN) | 2 | 3 | 7 | 12 |
| 12 | Canada (CAN) | 2 | 1 | 0 | 3 |
| 13 | Bulgaria (BUL) | 1 | 2 | 3 | 6 |
| 14 | United States (USA) | 1 | 2 | 1 | 4 |
| 15 | Norway (NOR) | 1 | 1 | 1 | 3 |
| 16 | Serbia (SRB) | 1 | 0 | 1 | 2 |
| 17 | Austria (AUT) | 0 | 2 | 1 | 3 |
| 18 | Sweden (SWE) | 0 | 2 | 0 | 2 |
| 19 | Germany (GER) | 0 | 1 | 3 | 4 |
| 20 | Finland (FIN) | 0 | 1 | 1 | 2 |
| 21 | Romania (ROM) | 0 | 1 | 0 | 1 |
| 22 | Australia (AUS) | 0 | 0 | 1 | 1 |
| Totals (22 entries) | | 140 | 140 | 140 | 420 |
