= 2019–20 Biathlon World Cup – Overall Men =

In the men's 2019–20 Biathlon World Cup total score, for each participating athlete the points earned in all Individual, Sprint, Pursuit and Mass start competitions held during the season are added up with the two lowest scores subtracted at the end of the season to give that athlete's final score. This includes the results from the Biathlon World Championships 2020 (held between the World Cup stages in Pokljuka and Nové Město).

== 2018–19 Top 3 standings ==
Medal	Athlete	Points
Gold:	(Norway) Johannes Thingnes Bø	1262
Silver:	(Russia) Alexandr Loginov	854
Bronze:	(France) Quentin Fillon Maillet	843

== Events summary ==
Event	Winner	Second	Third
Östersund 10 km Sprint details	Johannes Thingnes Bø; Norway	Tarjei Bø; Norway	Matvey Eliseev; Russia
Östersund 20 km Individual details	Martin Fourcade; France	Simon Desthieux; France	Quentin Fillon Maillet; France
Hochfilzen 10 km Sprint details	Johannes Thingnes Bø; Norway	Simon Desthieux; France	Alexander Loginov; Russia
Hochfilzen 12.5 km Pursuit details	Johannes Thingnes Bø; Norway	Alexander Loginov; Russia	Emilien Jacquelin; France
Le Grand–Bornand 10 km Sprint details	Benedikt Doll; Germany	Tarjei Bø; Norway	Quentin Fillon Maillet; France
Le Grand–Bornand 12.5 km Pursuit details	Johannes Thingnes Bø; Norway	Quentin Fillon Maillet; France	Vetle Sjåstad Christiansen; Norway
Le Grand–Bornand 15 km Mass Start details	Johannes Thingnes Bø; Norway	Emilien Jacquelin; France	Tarjei Bø; Norway
Oberhof 10 km Sprint details	Martin Fourcade; France	Emilien Jacquelin; France	Johannes Kühn; Germany
Oberhof 10 km Mass Start details	Martin Fourcade; France	Arnd Peiffer; Germany	Simon Desthieux; France
Ruhpolding 10 km Sprint details	Martin Fourcade; France	Quentin Fillon Maillet; France	Benedikt Doll; Germany
Ruhpolding 12.5 km Pursuit details	Martin Fourcade; France	Quentin Fillon Maillet; France	Vetle Sjåstad Christiansen; Norway
Pokljuka 20 km Individual details	Johannes Thingnes Bø; Norway	Martin Fourcade; France	Fabien Claude; France
Pokljuka 15 km Mass Start details	Quentin Fillon Maillet; France	Benedikt Doll; Germany	Johannes Thingnes Bø; Norway
World Championships 10 km Sprint details	Alexander Loginov; Russia	Quentin Fillon Maillet; France	Martin Fourcade; France
World Championships 12.5 km Pursuit details	Emilien Jacquelin; France	Johannes Thingnes Bø; Norway	Alexander Loginov; Russia
World Championships 20 km Individual details	Martin Fourcade; France	Johannes Thingnes Bø; Norway	Dominik Landertinger; Austria
World Championships 15 km Mass Start details	Johannes Thingnes Bø; Norway	Quentin Fillon Maillet; France	Emilien Jacquelin; France
Nové Město 10 km Sprint details	Johannes Thingnes Bø; Norway	Quentin Fillon Maillet; France	Tarjei Bø; Norway
Nové Město 15 km Mass Start details	Johannes Thingnes Bø; Norway	Emilien Jacquelin; France	Arnd Peiffer; Germany
Kontiolahti 10 km Sprint details	Johannes Thingnes Bø; Norway	Martin Fourcade; France	Emilien Jacquelin; France
Kontiolahti 12.5 km Pursuit details	Martin Fourcade; France	Quentin Fillon Maillet; France	Emilien Jacquelin; France
Oslo Holmenkollen 10 km Sprint	Cancelled due to the coronavirus pandemic		
Oslo Holmenkollen 12.5 km Pursuit	Cancelled due to the coronavirus pandemic		
Oslo Holmenkollen 15 km Mass Start	Cancelled due to the coronavirus pandemic		

== Standings ==
Point system
Place	IN	SP	PU	MS
1	60			
2	54			
3	48			
4	43			
5	40			
6	38			
7	36			
8	34			
9	32			
10	31			
11	30			
12	29			
13	28			
14	27			
15	26			
16	25			
17	24			
18	23			
19	22			
20	21			
21	20			
22	19			18
23	18			16
24	17			14
25	16			12
26	15			10
27	14			8
28	13			6
29	12			4
30	11			2
31	10			—
32	9			—
33	8			—
34	7			—
35	6			—
36	5			—
37	4			—
38	3			—
39	2			—
40	1			—

In each event places 1 to 40 (1 to 30 in a Mass start) are awarded points, a victory being worth 60 points. The full point system is shown in the table on the right. In a Mass start event only 30 athletes are allowed to participate and the points awarded for ranks 22 to 30 differ from the system used in other events. Equal placings (ties) give an equal number of points. An athlete's total World Cup Score is the sum of all World Cup points earned in the season, minus the points from 2 events in which the athlete got their worst scores. Ties in this score are broken by comparing the tied athletes' number of victories. If this number is the same for the athletes in question, the number of second places is compared, and so on. If a tie cannot be broken by this procedure, it remains a tie.

#	Name	ÖST SP	ÖST IN	HOC SP	HOC PU	LGB SP	LGB PU	LGB MS	OBE SP	OBE MS	RUH SP	RUH PU	POK IN	POK MS	ANT SP	ANT PU	ANT IN	ANT MS	NOV SP	NOV MS	KON SP	KON PU	OSL SP	OSL PU	OSL MS	Total
1.	Johannes Thingnes Bø (NOR)	60	31	60	60	43	60	60	–	–	–	–	60	48	40	54	54	60	60	60	60	43	–	–	–	913
2	Martin Fourcade (FRA)	40	60	31	31	~~29~~	36	40	60	60	60	60	54	40	48	43	60	36	38	~~27~~	54	60	–	–	–	911
3	Quentin Fillon Maillet (FRA)	29	48	27	32	48	54	43	~~22~~	~~25~~	54	54	36	60	54	36	36	54	54	34	36	54	–	–	–	843
4	Tarjei Bø (NOR)	54	38	38	38	54	43	48	17	~~12~~	~~13~~	36	38	32	43	38	38	43	48	31	40	23	–	–	–	740
5	Émilien Jacquelin (FRA)	30	43	23	48	21	38	54	54	~~2~~	29	38	9	12	38	60	–	48	31	54	48	48	–	–	–	726
6	Simon Desthieux (FRA)	27	54	54	40	34	26	31	38	48	40	43	~~20~~	24	23	34	0	40	34	20	34	28	–	–	–	672
7	Alexandr Loginov (RUS)	43	32	48	54	30	28	30	40	24	30	31	25	21	60	48	26	–	0	–	23	36	–	–	–	629
8	Benedikt Doll (GER)	17	25	30	27	60	40	25	0	18	48	40	31	54	27	~~12~~	29	29	29	24	38	22	–	–	–	613
9	Johannes Dale (NOR)	36	5	29	26	38	29	38	32	43	14	32	40	36	18	24	32	34	32	38	0	–	–	–	–	576
10	Vetle Sjåstad Christiansen (NOR)	0	10	19	10	28	48	26	31	34	43	48	32	43	8	31	0	28	16	36	43	32	–	–	–	566
11	Arnd Peiffer (GER)	–	DNF	17	28	20	32	36	36	54	19	27	0	28	36	40	0	20	27	48	32	40	–	–	–	540
12	Erlend Bjøntegaard (NOR)	34	28	26	24	40	34	32	34	28	21	25	5	38	6	26	–	–	–	40	16	38	–	–	–	495
13	Johannes Kühn (GER)	38	0	21	29	27	18	27	48	22	32	17	34	10	~~1~~	13	15	31	30	29	20	13	–	–	–	474
14	Jakov Fak (SLO)	18	0	28	43	0	–	28	25	40	27	28	29	20	0	20	43	26	40	28	21	3	–	–	–	467
15	Matvey Eliseev (RUS)	48	34	43	30	13	11	4	43	31	24	18	3	30	29	0	–	6	3	25	27	0	–	–	–	422
16	Lukas Hofer (ITA)	26	22	40	36	32	17	20	0	10	0	–	28	31	20	21	28	23	0	4	17	31	–	–	–	406
17	Dmytro Pidruchnyi (UKR)	0	21	32	25	23	21	16	–	26	31	DNF	11	6	31	11	–	16	6	43	22	25	–	–	–	366
18	Philipp Horn (GER)	0	14	22	23	16	30	6	28	38	17	4	27	29	34	23	20	14	7	8	0	0	–	–	–	360
19	Fabien Claude (FRA)	21	36	18	34	6	7	22	0	4	40	26	48	–	–	–	22	–	0	12	30	29	–	–	–	355
20	Julian Eberhard (AUT)	32	17	11	19	31	25	18	2	27	23	16	0	14	15	27	DNF	32	18	–	–	–	–	–	–	327
21	Michal Krčmář (CZE)	25	12	1	12	24	27	12	0	32	3	20	0	26	2	14	18	–	43	21	11	5	–	–	–	308
22	Felix Leitner (AUT)	0	23	34	21	0	0	29	0	6	0	5	0	–	32	32	14	38	22	16	28	DNS	–	–	–	300
23	Artem Pryma (UKR)	6	3	0	0	7	14	–	26	14	34	30	23	4	16	17	5	21	0	30	19	24	–	–	–	293
24	Simon Eder (AUT)	0	29	–	–	15	15	34	18	30	0	–	26	34	4	29	1	–	21	18	–	–	–	–	–	274
25	Dominik Windisch (ITA)	0	0	36	20	36	24	24	0	16	16	8	0	8	0	0	0	27	0	32	1	19	–	–	–	267
26	Ondřej Moravec (CZE)	0	24	9	0	–	–	–	30	29	11	23	16	–	0	19	25	30	0	22	8	12	–	–	–	258
27	Antonin Guigonnat (FRA)	20	0	25	15	0	0	–	1	–	28	34	30	18	–	–	–	–	26	10	26	21	–	–	–	254
28	Sebastian Samuelsson (SWE)	14	18	0	0	14	2	–	9	–	26	24	–	–	30	22	31	8	0	–	29	14	–	–	–	241
29	Andrejs Rastorgujevs (LAT)	23	7	2	22	5	8	–	23	–	25	15	22	25	0	–	19	–	19	2	3	6	–	–	–	226
30	Benjamin Weger (SUI)	0	40	0	DNF	0	0	–	29	21	8	7	19	16	0	0	40	12	–	–	–	–	–	–	–	192
#	Name	ÖST SP	ÖST IN	HOC SP	HOC PU	LGB SP	LGB PU	LGB MS	OBE SP	OBE MS	RUH SP	RUH PU	POK IN	POK MS	ANT SP	ANT PU	ANT IN	ANT MS	NOV SP	NOV MS	KON SP	KON PU	OSL SP	OSL PU	OSL MS	Total
31	Jesper Nelin (SWE)	0	0	0	–	0	1	–	24	36	0	2	0	–	22	30	0	22	8	–	18	18	–	–	–	181
32	Evgeniy Garanichev (RUS)	12	30	0	7	12	5	–	13	–	0	19	6	–	0	7	27	–	0	–	10	26	–	–	–	174
33	Martin Ponsiluoma (SWE)	0	11	0	–	26	22	8	0	–	0	–	–	–	14	18	12	4	0	–	24	34	–	–	–	173
34	Florent Claude (BEL)	22	16	0	1	18	19	10	0	–	7	0	0	–	7	9	16	–	0	–	12	4	–	–	–	141
35	Vladimir Iliev (BUL)	31	0	0	8	19	23	21	4	20	0	–	12	–	0	0	0	–	0	–	0	DNS	–	–	–	138
36	Anton Smolski (BLR)	0	6	0	–	–	–	–	16	–	0	0	0	–	26	3	7	–	23	–	25	27	–	–	–	133
37	Tero Seppälä (FIN)	3	15	6	17	8	4	–	10	–	0	0	0	–	0	0	0	–	36	23	0	10	–	–	–	132
38	Philipp Nawrath (GER)	–	–	–	–	–	–	–	–	–	36	29	43	23	–	–	0	–	–	–	–	–	–	–	–	131
39	Nikita Porshnev (RUS)	4	0	7	3	17	10	23	0	–	0	–	4	–	20	2	30	10	0	–	0	–	–	–	–	130
40	Krasimir Anev (BUL)	0	26	0	–	–	–	–	8	–	0	–	DNF	–	11	28	23	25	2	–	0	DNS	–	–	–	123
41	Simon Schempp (GER)	9	0	15	13	9	31	14	0	8	–	–	–	–	–	–	–	–	20	–	0	0	–	–	–	119
42	Raman Yaliotnau (BLR)	13	0	0	–	0	–	–	27	23	18	14	–	–	9	0	0	–	13	–	2	0	–	–	–	119
43	Sturla Holm Laegreid (NOR)	–	–	–	–	–	–	–	–	–	–	–	–	–	–	–	–	–	28	26	31	30	–	–	–	115
44	Timofey Lapshin (KOR)	0	0	24	5	22	20	2	0	–	0	DNF	0	–	24	0	0	–	0	–	0	17	–	–	–	114
45	Dominik Landertinger (AUT)	0	20	DNS	–	0	0	–	–	–	3	6	0	–	10	1	48	24	0	–	0	–	–	–	–	112
46	Peppe Femling (SWE)	0	0	0	–	0	6	–	0	–	3	0	0	–	21	25	24	18	12	–	0	–	–	–	–	109
47	Thomas Bormolini (ITA)	28	13	0	–	0	9	–	0	–	9	0	0	–	1	0	0	–	9	–	15	15	–	–	–	99
48	Sergey Bocharnikov (BLR)	19	0	0	0	12	3	–	12	–	0	–	18	2	0	–	0	–	5	–	7	9	–	–	–	87
49	Vytautas Strolia (LTU)	0	0	10	0	0	–	–	21	–	15	DNS	0	–	13	10	0	–	0	–	9	8	–	–	–	86
50	Sean Doherty (USA)	0	0	5	0	1	0	–	20	–	20	9	0	–	0	0	17	–	12	–	DNS	–	–	–	–	84
51	Klemen Bauer (SLO)	7	0	16	DSQ	0	0	–	0	–	6	0	7	–	0	–	8	–	4	–	14	20	–	–	–	82
52	Eduard Latypov (RUS)	16	0	0	–	0	0	–	3	–	0	3	17	–	–	–	0	–	24	6	5	0	–	–	–	74
53	Cheng Fangming (CHN)	–	19	0	0	0	0	–	14	–	0	–	–	–	0	–	0	–	25	14	0	0	–	–	–	72
54	Jakub Štvrtecký (CZE)	2	9	12	0	25	0	–	0	–	10	0	–	–	0	0	0	–	10	–	0	–	–	–	–	68
55	Leif Nordgren (USA)	0	0	0	0	3	0	–	15	–	0	0	14	–	0	–	34	–	0	–	DNS	–	–	–	–	66
56	Scott Gow (CAN)	0	8	0	–	0	–	–	11	–	0	0	15	–	25	6	0	–	1	–	0	–	–	–	–	66
57	Rok Trsan (SLO)	0	0	0	–	0	16	–	0	–	0	10	10	–	12	16	0	–	0	–	0	0	–	–	–	64
58	Anton Dudchenko (UKR)	0	0	13	9	10	12	–	0	–	4	12	0	–	0	0	0	–	0	–	–	–	–	–	–	60
59	Erik Lesser (GER)	8	0	0	–	0	–	–	–	–	–	–	21	27	–	–	–	–	–	–	–	–	–	–	–	56
60	Thierry Langer (BEL)	0	0	20	18	0	–	–	0	–	12	0	–	–	0	–	3	–	0	–	0	0	–	–	–	53
#	Name	ÖST SP	ÖST IN	HOC SP	HOC PU	LGB SP	LGB PU	LGB MS	OBE SP	OBE MS	RUH SP	RUH PU	POK IN	POK MS	ANT SP	ANT PU	ANT IN	ANT MS	NOV SP	NOV MS	KON SP	KON PU	OSL SP	OSL PU	OSL MS	Total
61	Martin Otcenas (SVK)	0	0	0	DNF	0	–	–	0	–	0	–	2	–	28	15	0	2	0	–	–	–	–	–	–	47
62	Kirill Streltsov (RUS)	–	–	–	–	–	–	–	–	–	–	–	24	22	–	–	–	–	–	–	–	–	–	–	–	46
63	Roman Rees (GER)	–	–	–	–	–	–	–	–	–	22	22	–	–	–	–	–	–	–	–	–	–	–	–	–	44
64	Lars Helge Birkeland (NOR)	11	4	–	–	–	–	–	0	–	0	21	–	–	–	–	–	–	–	–	–	–	–	–	–	36
65	Aleksander Fjeld Andersen (NOR)	–	–	8	14	–	–	–	0	–	0	13	0	–	–	–	–	–	0	–	–	–	–	–	–	35
66	Mikita Labastau (BLR)	0	–	0	2	0	13	–	–	–	0	11	0	–	5	4	–	–	0	–	–	–	–	–	–	35
67	Sergii Semenov (UKR)	–	–	–	–	–	–	–	0	–	5	1	1	–	0	0	10	–	17	–	0	–	–	–	–	34
68	Mario Dolder (SUI)	24	0	0	DNS	0	0	–	0	–	0	0	0	–	3	5	DNS	–	0	–	0	–	–	–	–	32
69	Dmitry Malyshko (RUS)	0	2	14	16	0	0	–	–	–	–	–	–	–	–	–	–	–	–	–	–	–	–	–	–	32
70	Adam Václavík (CZE)	15	0	0	–	4	0	–	–	–	–	–	0	–	0	–	–	–	0	–	0	11	–	–	–	30
71	Anton Babikov (RUS)	0	27	–	–	–	–	–	–	–	–	–	–	–	–	–	–	–	–	–	–	–	–	–	–	27
72	Grzegorz Guzik (POL)	0	0	0	–	0	0	–	0	–	0	–	0	–	17	8	0	–	0	–	0	1	–	–	–	26
73	Karol Dombrovski (LTU)	0	0	0	0	0	–	–	5	–	0		8	–	0	0	11	–	0	–	0	–	–	–	–	24
74	Christian Gow (CAN)	0	0	DNS	–	DNS	–	–	0	–	0	0	0	–	0	–	21	–	0	–	DNS	–	–	–	–	21
75	Jeremy Finello (SUI)	0	0	0	–	–	–	–	DNS	–	0	–	–	–	–	–	–	–	16	–	4	DNF	–	–	–	20
76	Roman Yeremin (KAZ)	0	0	0	0	0	–	–	19	–	0	–	0	–	–	–	–	–	–	–	–	–	–	–	–	19
77	Said Karimulla Khalili (RUS)	–	–	–	–	–	–	–	0	–	0	–	–	–	–	–	–	–	0	–	0	16	–	–	–	16
78	Tommaso Giacomel (ITA)	–	–	–	–	–	–	–	–	–	–	–	–	–	–	–	–	–	14	–	0	2	–	–	–	16
79	Serafin Wiestner (SUI)	0	0	5	11	0	0	–	0	–	0	0	0	–	0	0	0	–	0	–	0	–	–	–	–	16
80	Cornel Puchianu (ROU)	0	0	0	–	0	–	–	0	–	0	–	0	–	0	–	0	–	0	–	13	DNS	–	–	–	13
81	Maksim Varabei (BLR)	–	0	–	–	0	–	–	0	–	–	–	13	–	–	–	0	–	–	–	–	–	–	–	–	13
82	Jules Burnotte (CAN)	0	DNS	0	–	0	–	–	–	–	0	0	0	–	0	–	13	–	0	–	0	–	–	–	–	13
83	Miha Dovzan (SLO)	0	–	0	6	0	0	–	0	–	0	–	0	–	0	–	0	–	0	–	0	7	–	–	–	13
84	Michal Šlesingr (CZE)	5	1	0	–	–	–	–	6	–	0	–	0	–	–	–	0	–	0	–	–	–	–	–	–	12
85	Tomas Kaukėnas (LTU)	10	0	0	–	0	–	–	–	–	0	–	0	–	0	–	0	–	0	–	0	–	–	–	–	10
86	George Buta (ROU)	0	0	0	–	0	–	–	0	–	0	–	0	–	0	0	9	–	0	–	0	–	–	–	–	9
87	Tomas Krupcik (CZE)	–	–	–	–	–	–	–	7	–	0	–	0	–	–	–	–	–	–	–	–	–	–	–	–	7
88	Rene Zahkna (EST)	0	0	0	–	0	–	–	0	–	0	–	0	–	0	0	6	–	0	–	0	0	–	–	–	6
89	Kalev Ermits (EST)	0	0	0	0	0	–	–	0	–	0	0	–	–	0	–	0	–	0	–	6	0	–	–	–	6
90	Joscha Burkhalter (SUI)	–	0	0	4	0	0	–	0	–	0	–	–	–	0	–	–	–	–	–	–	–	–	–	–	4
#	Name	ÖST SP	ÖST IN	HOC SP	HOC PU	LGB SP	LGB PU	LGB MS	OBE SP	OBE MS	RUH SP	RUH PU	POK IN	POK MS	ANT SP	ANT PU	ANT IN	ANT MS	NOV SP	NOV MS	KON SP	KON PU	OSL SP	OSL PU	OSL MS	Total
91	Lukasz Szczurek (POL)	0	0	0	–	0	–	–	0	–	0	–	0	–	0	–	4	–	0	–	0	–	–	–	–	4
92	Tobias Eberhard (AUT)	0	DNS	3	0	0	–	–	0	–	0	–	–	–	–	–	–	–	DNS	–	–	–	–	–	–	3
93	Ruslan Tkalenko (UKR)	0	0	0	–	2	0	–	–	–	–	–	–	–	–	–	0	–	DNS	–	0	0	–	–	–	2
94	Andrzej Nedza-Kubiniec (POL)	–	0	0	–	0	–	–	0	–	0	–	0	–	0	–	2	–	0	–	0	–	–	–	–	2
95	Torstein Stenersen (SWE)	1	0	0	–	0	0	–	0	–	0	–	0	–	–	–	–	–	0	–	–	–	–	–	–	1
