= 2019–20 Biathlon World Cup – Sprint Men =

The 2019–20 Biathlon World Cup – Sprint Men started on 1 December 2019 in Östersund and was finished on 12 March 2020 in Kontiolahti.

== Competition format ==
The 10 kilometres (6.2 mi) sprint race is the third oldest biathlon event; the distance is skied over three laps. The biathlete shoots two times at any shooting lane, first prone, then standing, totalling 10 targets. For each missed target the biathlete has to complete a penalty lap of around 150 metres (490 ft). Competitors' starts are staggered, normally by 30 seconds.

== 2018–19 Top 3 standings ==
Medal	Athlete	Points
Gold:	(Norway) Johannes Thingnes Bø	514
Silver:	(Russia) Alexandr Loginov	350
Bronze:	(France) Simon Desthieux	338

== Medal winners ==
Event	Gold	Time	Silver	Time	Bronze	Time
Östersund details	Johannes Thingnes Bø; Norway	24:18.3 (1+0)	Tarjei Bø; Norway	24:37.3 (0+1)	Matvey Eliseev; Russia	24:38.2 (0+0)
Hochfilzen details	Johannes Thingnes Bø; Norway	25:07.8 (0+1)	Simon Desthieux; France	25:15.6 (0+1)	Alexander Loginov; Russia	25:22.4 (0+0)
Le Grand-Bornand details	Benedikt Doll; Germany	23:22.1 (0+0)	Tarjei Bø; Norway	23:31.5 (0+0)	Quentin Fillon Maillet; France	23:33.4 (0+0)
Oberhof (Note: The event was held on the 2.5 km lap used for the Women's 7.5 km Sprint with the men running an additional lap between the two shootings. The change was made due to rainfall the night before the event.) details	Martin Fourcade; France	25:27.2 (0+0)	Émilien Jacquelin; France	25:52.7 (0+1)	Johannes Kühn; Germany	26:00.2 (0+1)
Ruhpolding details	Martin Fourcade; France	22:41.5 (0+0)	Quentin Fillon Maillet; France	22:44.6 (0+0)	Benedikt Doll; Germany	22:53.5 (0+0)
World Championships details	Alexander Loginov; Russia	22:48.1 (0+0)	Quentin Fillon Maillet; France	22:54.6 (1+0)	Martin Fourcade; France	23:07.6 (0+0)
Nové Město details	Johannes Thingnes Bø; Norway	24:56.8 (0+0)	Quentin Fillon Maillet; France	25:19.6 (0+0)	Tarjei Bø; Norway	25:57.9 (0+0)
Kontiolahti details	Johannes Thingnes Bø; Norway	22:27.8 (0+0)	Martin Fourcade; France	22:48.9 (0+0)	Émilien Jacquelin; France	22:50.1 (0+0)
Oslo	Cancelled due to the coronavirus pandemic					

== Standings ==
#	Name	ÖST	HOC	ANN	OBE	RUH	ANT	NOV	KON	OSL	Total
1	Martin Fourcade (FRA)	40	31	29	60	60	48	38	54	–	360
2	Quentin Fillon Maillet (FRA)	29	27	48	22	54	54	54	36	–	324
3	Johannes Thingnes Bø (NOR)	60	60	43	–	–	40	60	60	–	323
4	Tarjei Bø (NOR)	54	38	54	17	13	43	48	40	–	307
5	Simon Desthieux (FRA)	27	54	34	38	40	23	34	34	–	284
6	Émilien Jacquelin (FRA)	30	23	21	54	29	38	31	48	–	274
7	Alexandr Loginov (RUS)	43	48	30	40	30	60	0	23	–	274
8	Benedikt Doll (GER)	17	30	60	0	48	27	29	38	–	249
9	Matvey Eliseev (RUS)	48	43	13	43	24	29	3	27	–	230
10	Johannes Kühn (GER)	38	21	27	48	32	1	30	20	–	217
11	Johannes Dale (NOR)	36	29	38	32	14	18	32	0	–	199
12	Vetle Sjåstad Christiansen (NOR)	0	19	28	31	43	8	16	43	–	188
13	Arnd Peiffer (GER)	–	17	20	36	19	36	27	32	–	187
14	Erlend Bjøntegaard (NOR)	34	26	40	34	21	6	–	16	–	177
15	Jakov Fak (SLO)	18	28	0	25	27	0	40	21	–	159
16	Dmytro Pidruchnyi (UKR)	0	32	23	–	31	31	6	22	–	145
17	Lukas Hofer (ITA)	26	40	32	0	0	20	0	17	–	135
18	Julian Eberhard (AUT)	32	11	31	2	23	15	18	–	–	132
19	Antonin Guigonnat (FRA)	20	25	0	1	28	–	26	26	–	126
20	Philipp Horn (GER)	0	22	16	28	17	34	7	0	–	124
21	Sebastian Samuelsson (SWE)	14	0	14	9	26	30	0	29	–	122
22	Felix Leitner (AUT)	0	34	0	0	0	32	22	28	–	116
23	Fabien Claude (FRA)	21	18	6	0	40	–	0	30	–	115
24	Michal Krčmář (CZE)	25	1	24	0	3	2	43	11	–	109
25	Artem Pryma (UKR)	6	0	7	26	34	16	0	19	–	108
26	Andrejs Rastorgujevs (LAT)	23	2	5	23	25	0	19	3	–	100
27	Anton Smolski (BLR)	0	0	–	16	0	26	23	25	–	90
28	Dominik Windisch (ITA)	0	36	36	0	16	0	0	1	–	89
29	Raman Yaliotnau (BLR)	13	0	0	27	18	9	13	2	–	82
30	Jesper Nelin (SWE)	0	0	0	24	0	22	8	18	–	72
#	Name	ÖST	HOC	ANN	OBE	RUH	ANT	NOV	KON	OSL	Total
31	Timofey Lapshin (KOR)	0	24	22	0	0	24	0	0	–	70
32	Vytautas Strolia (LTU)	0	10	0	21	15	13	0	9	–	68
33	Florent Claude (BEL)	22	0	18	0	7	7	0	12	–	66
34	Martin Ponsiluoma (SWE)	0	0	26	0	0	14	0	24	–	64
35	Tero Seppälä (FIN)	3	6	8	10	0	0	36	0	–	63
36	Thomas Bormolini (ITA)	28	0	0	0	9	1	9	15	–	62
37	Sturla Holm Laegreid (NOR)	–	–	–	–	–	–	28	31	–	59
38	Jakub Štvrtecký (CZE)	2	12	25	0	10	0	10	0	–	59
39	Ondřej Moravec (CZE)	0	9	–	30	11	0	0	8	–	58
40	Simon Eder (AUT)	0	–	15	18	0	4	21	–	–	58
41	Sean Doherty (USA)	0	5	1	20	20	0	12	DNS	–	58
42	Sergey Bocharnikov (BLR)	19	0	12	12	0	0	5	7	–	55
43	Vladimir Iliev (BUL)	31	0	19	4	0	0	0	0	–	54
44	Simon Schempp (GER)	9	15	9	0	–	–	20	0	–	53
45	Eduard Latypov (RUS)	16	0	0	3	0	–	24	5	–	48
46	Nikita Porshnev (RUS)	4	7	17	0	0	20	0	0	–	48
47	Klemen Bauer (SLO)	7	16	0	0	6	0	4	14	–	47
48	Evgeniy Garanichev (RUS)	12	0	12	13	0	0	0	10	–	47
49	Cheng Fangming (CHN)	–	0	0	14	0	0	25	0	–	39
50	Benjamin Weger (SUI)	0	0	0	29	8	0	–	–	–	37
51	Scott Gow (CAN)	0	0	0	11	0	25	1	0	–	37
52	Philipp Nawrath (GER)	–	–	–	–	36	–	–	–	–	36
53	Peppe Femling (SWE)	0	0	0	0	3	21	12	0	–	36
54	Thierry Langer (BEL)	0	20	0	0	12	0	0	0	–	32
55	Martin Otcenas (SVK)	0	0	0	0	0	28	0	–	–	28
56	Mario Dolder (SUI)	24	0	0	0	0	3	0	0	–	27
57	Anton Dudchenko (UKR)	0	13	10	0	4	0	0	–	–	27
58	Roman Rees (GER)	–	–	–	–	22	–	–	–	–	22
59	Sergii Semenov (UKR)	–	–	–	0	5	0	17	0	–	22
60	Krasimir Anev (BUL)	0	0	–	8	0	11	2	0	–	21
#	Name	ÖST	HOC	ANN	OBE	RUH	ANT	NOV	KON	OSL	Total
61	Jeremy Finello (SUI)	0	0	–	DNS	0	–	16	4	–	20
62	Roman Yeremin (KAZ)	0	0	0	19	0	–	–	–	–	19
63	Adam Václavík (CZE)	15	0	4	–	–	0	0	0	–	19
64	Leif Nordgren (USA)	0	0	3	15	0	0	0	DNS	–	18
65	Grzegorz Guzik (POL)	0	0	0	0	0	17	0	0	–	17
66	Dmitry Malyshko (RUS)	0	14	0	–	–	–	–	–	–	14
67	Tommaso Giacomel (ITA)	–	–	–	–	–	–	14	0	–	14
68	Cornel Puchianu (ROU)	0	0	0	0	0	0	0	13	–	13
69	Dominik Landertinger (AUT)	0	DNS	0	–	3	10	0	0	–	13
70	Rok Trsan (SLO)	0	0	0	0	0	12	0	0	–	12
71	Lars Helge Birkeland (NOR)	11	–	–	0	0	–	–	–	–	11
72	Michal Šlesingr (CZE)	5	0	–	6	0	–	0	–	–	11
73	Tomas Kaukėnas (LTU)	10	0	0	–	0	0	0	0	–	10
74	Aleksander Fjeld Andersen (NOR)	–	8	–	0	0	–	0	–	–	8
75	Erik Lesser (GER)	8	0	0	–	–	–	–	–	–	8
76	Tomas Krupcik (CZE)	–	–	–	7	0	–	–	–	–	7
77	Kalev Ermits (EST)	0	0	0	0	0	0	0	6	–	6
78	Serafin Wiestner (SUI)	0	5	0	0	0	0	0	0	–	5
79	Mikita Labastau (BLR)	0	0	0	–	0	5	0	–	–	5
80	Karol Dombrovski (LTU)	0	0	0	5	0	0	0	0	–	5
81	Tobias Eberhard (AUT)	0	3	0	0	0	–	DNS	–	–	3
82	Ruslan Tkalenko (UKR)	0	0	2	–	–	–	DNS	0	–	2
83	Torstein Stenersen (SWE)	1	0	0	0	0	–	0	–	–	1
