= 2020–21 Biathlon World Cup – Sprint Men =

The 2020–21 Biathlon World Cup – Sprint Men started on 29 November 2020 in Kontiolahti and will finished on 19 March 2021 in Östersund

== Competition format ==
The 10 kilometres (6.2 mi) sprint race is the third oldest biathlon event; the distance is skied over three laps. The biathlete shoots two times at any shooting lane, first prone, then standing, totalling 10 targets. For each missed target the biathlete has to complete a penalty lap of around 150 metres (490 ft). Competitors' starts are staggered, normally by 30 seconds.

== 2019–20 Top 3 standings ==
Medal	Athlete	Points
Gold:	(France) Martin Fourcade	360
Silver:	(France) Quentin Fillon Maillet	324
Bronze:	(Norway) Johannes Thingnes Bø	323

== Medal winners ==
Event	Gold	Time	Silver	Time	Bronze	Time
Kontiolahti details	Johannes Thingnes Bø; Norway	23:53.0 (0+0)	Sebastian Samuelsson; Sweden	24:37.1 (1+0)	Martin Ponsiluoma; Sweden	24:40.9 (1+0)
Kontiolahti (2) details	Tarjei Bø; Norway	24:03.7 (0+0)	Arnd Peiffer; Germany	24:17.6 (0+0)	Johannes Thingnes Bø; Norway	24:33.1 (1+0)
Hochfilzen details	Johannes Dale; Norway	23:32.5 (0+0)	Quentin Fillon Maillet; France	23:49.6 (0+0)	Fabien Claude; France	24:01.5 (0+1)
Hochfilzen (2) details	Sturla Holm Lægreid; Norway	23:04.9 (0+0)	Johannes Dale; Norway	23:12.8 (0+0)	Johannes Thingnes Bø; Norway	23:24.8 (2+0)
Oberhof details	Johannes Thingnes Bø; Norway	25:12.0 (0+1)	Tarjei Bø; Norway	25:22.8 (0+0)	Sturla Holm Lægreid; Norway	25:33.6 (0+0)
Oberhof (2) details	Johannes Thingnes Bø; Norway	24:43.6 (0+0)	Sturla Holm Lægreid; Norway	24:56.0 (0+0)	Arnd Peiffer; Germany	25:11.5 (0+0)
World Championships details	Martin Ponsiluoma; Sweden	24:41.1 (0+0)	Simon Desthieux; France	24:52.3 (0+0)	Émilien Jacquelin; France	24:54.0 (1+0)
Nové Město details	Simon Desthieux; France	22:58.0 (0+0)	Sebastian Samuelsson; Sweden	23:00.4 (0+0)	Arnd Peiffer; Germany	23:02.4 (0+0)
Nové Město (2) details	Quentin Fillon Maillet; France	22:07.2 (0+0)	Tarjei Bø; Norway	22:18.5 (0+0)	Lukas Hofer; Italy	22:22.0 (0+0)
Östersund details	Lukas Hofer; Italy	22:27.1 (0+0)	Sebastian Samuelsson; Sweden	22:31.1 (0+0)	Tarjei Bø; Norway	22:41.5 (0+0)

== Standings ==
7 of 10 competitions scored

#	Name	KON	KON 2	HOC	HOC 2	OBH	OBH 2	POK	NME	NME 2	OST	Total
1	Johannes Thingnes Bø (NOR)	60	48	43	48	60	60	40	~~30~~	~~32~~	~~36~~	359
2	Sturla Holm Lægreid (NOR)	~~23~~	~~19~~	~~32~~	60	48	54	36	43	40	38	319
3	Tarjei Bø (NOR)	~~26~~	60	30	~~27~~	54	~~28~~	32	40	54	48	318
4	Sebastian Samuelsson (SWE)	54	~~23~~	40	40	~~23~~	~~23~~	34	54	36	54	312
5	Johannes Dale (NOR)	~~28~~	36	60	54	40	40	43	~~23~~	~~34~~	34	307
6	Quentin Fillon Maillet (FRA)	38	~~11~~	54	36	0	~~34~~	38	36	60	40	302
7	Lukas Hofer (ITA)	30	27	0	~~26~~	43	38	28	~~20~~	48	60	274
8	Simon Desthieux (FRA)	24	29	0	23	36	~~14~~	54	60	~~20~~	43	269
9	Martin Ponsiluoma (SWE)	48	32	~~26~~	32	38	32	60	~~21~~	~~27~~	27	269
10	Émilien Jacquelin (FRA)	34	~~2~~	38	34	27	~~27~~	48	34	43	~~17~~	258
11	Arnd Peiffer (GER)	36	54	DNS	19	0	48	5	48	28	–	238
12	Jakov Fak (SLO)	40	38	~~13~~	30	29	24	~~6~~	32	31	~~9~~	224
13	Vetle Sjåstad Christiansen (NOR)	43	26	36	43	0	25	–	~~17~~	21	29	223
14	Benedikt Doll (GER)	~~9~~	34	34	18	26	30	~~2~~	38	26	~~10~~	206
15	Erik Lesser (GER)	32	25	31	0	16	43	0	27	22	~~8~~	196
16	Eduard Latypov (RUS)	21	0	20	~~11~~	30	26	31	31	~~16~~	18	177
17	Fabien Claude (FRA)	16	30	48	29	34	0	0	0	19	0	176
18	Antonin Guigonnat (FRA)	~~15~~	20	27	0	19	15	27	28	38	0	174
19	Benjamin Weger (SUI)	19	43	15	25	32	17	0	~~5~~	15	~~12~~	166
20	Simon Eder (AUT)	~~3~~	0	28	16	20	0	25	13	30	28	160
21	Matvey Eliseev (RUS)	27	~~8~~	9	~~3~~	25	31	22	~~7~~	25	20	159
22	Alexander Loginov (RUS)	29	~~7~~	21	24	22	20	~~15~~	18	24	~~15~~	158
23	Michal Krčmář (CZE)	25	31	10	9	–	–	30	~~2~~	29	23	157
24	Dmytro Pidruchnyi (UKR)	0	6	0	38	0	36	18	26	6	7	137
25	Anton Smolski (BLR)	~~7~~	~~6~~	17	15	7	0	8	19	23	24	113
26	Felix Leitner (AUT)	0	24	29	0	4	22	0	11	0	21	111
27	Jesper Nelin (SWE)	13	12	~~8~~	22	13	DNS	23	9	18	~~5~~	110
28	Andrejs Rastorgujevs (LAT)	18	0	5	0	1	29	26	24	DNS	–	103
28	Sergey Bocharnikov (BLR)	12	28	0	13	28	0	9	0	5	2	97
30	Erlend Bjøntegaard (NOR)	17	40	16	–	–	21	–	–	–	–	94
#	Name	KON	KON 2	HOC	HOC 2	OBH	OBH 2	POK	NME	NME 2	OST	Total
31	Roman Rees (GER)	6	14	24	0	–	0	–	0	14	31	89
32	Evgeniy Garanichev (RUS)	–	–	12	28	0	0	–	4	11	30	85
33	Tero Seppälä (FIN)	0	10	25	10	0	10	13	15	1	0	84
34	David Komatz (AUT)	4	0	19	20	24	0	3	0	0	6	76
35	Peppe Femling (SWE)	0	15	22	0	5	18	10	0	0	0	70
36	Jake Brown (USA)	11	0	0	0	–	0	29	0	8	19	67
37	Christian Gow (CAN)	0	16	0	4	12	0	24	10	0	0	66
38	Artem Pryma (UKR)	0	21	11	2	11	0	21	0	0	0	66
39	Dominik Windisch (ITA)	–	0	0	0	10	19	7	0	13	14	63
40	Julian Eberhard (AUT)	20	4	7	31	–	–	0	–	–	–	62
41	Vladimir Iliev (BUL)	0	1	0	0	3	–	0	16	0	32	52
42	Maksim Varabei (BLR)	2	22	0	8	0	0	17	0	0	1	50
43	Scott Gow (CAN)	0	0	0	0	0	2	0	22	10	16	50
44	Vytautas Strolia (LTU)	14	0	0	0	21	14	0	0	0	0	49
45	Ondřej Moravec (CZE)	31	0	3	14	–	0	0	0	0	–	48
46	Raman Yaliotnau (BLR)	10	0	0	5	31	0	–	–	–	–	46
47	Florent Claude (BEL)	1	3	0	0	0	7	19	14	0	0	44
48	Thierry Langer (BEL)	8	9	0	0	0	0	0	0	0	26	43
49	Aleksander Fjeld Andersen (NOR)	–	–	–	17	–	–	–	–	–	25	42
50	Johannes Kühn (GER)	22	13	6	0	–	1	0	DNF	0	0	42
51	Thomas Bormolini (ITA)	–	0	4	0	15	6	14	0	2	0	41
52	Philipp Horn (GER)	–	–	18	0	18	0	–	–	0	0	36
53	Olli Hiidensalo (FIN)	0	0	23	0	0	–	12	–	–	–	35
54	Jakub Štvrtecký (CZE)	0	0	0	0	0	0	0	0	12	22	34
55	Sean Doherty (USA)	0	0	1	0	6	5	0	12	9	0	33
56	Endre Strømsheim (NOR)	–	–	–	–	–	–	–	29	0	0	29
57	Said Karimulla Khalili (RUS)	–	–	0	0	–	–	0	25	3	0	28
58	Kirill Streltsov (RUS)	–	–	–	–	14	11	–	0	0	0	25
59	Miha Dovžan (SLO)	0	0	0	0	0	4	16	0	4	0	24
60	Alexandr Mukhin (KAZ)	0	0	0	0	0	12	0	0	0	11	23
#	Name	KON	KON 2	HOC	HOC 2	OBH	OBH 2	POK	NME	NME 2	OST	Total
61	Jeremy Finello (SUI)	0	18	0	0	0	0	0	0	0	4	22
62	Anton Dudchenko (UKR)	–	0	0	21	–	0	0	0	0	0	21
63	Didier Bionaz (ITA)	0	0	0	1	0	0	20	0	0	0	21
64	Michal Šíma (SVK)	0	0	0	0	0	16	4	0	0	0	20
65	Mihail Usov (MDA)	–	–	–	0	0	0	0	0	17	0	17
66	Klemen Bauer (SLO)	0	17	0	0	–	–	0	0	0	–	17
67	Sivert Guttorm Bakken (NOR)	–	–	–	–	17	–	–	–	–	–	17
68	Tsukasa Kobonoki (JPN)	–	0	0	0	–	0	0	3	0	13	16
69	Harald Lemmerer (AUT)	0	0	0	6	0	9	–	0	0	0	15
70	Rok Tršan (SLO)	–	0	14	0	0	0	0	0	0	0	14
71	Leif Nordgren (USA)	0	0	0	12	2	0	0	0	0	0	14
72	Bogdan Tsymbal (UKR)	0	0	0	0	–	–	11	0	0	0	11
73	Karol Dombrovski (LTU)	0	0	0	0	9	0	1	0	0	0	10
74	Pavel Magazeev (MDA)	–	0	0	0	0	8	0	0	0	0	8
75	Martin Jäger (SUI)	–	–	–	–	–	–	0	8	0	0	8
76	Emilien Claude (FRA)	–	–	–	–	8	0	–	–	0	0	8
77	Mikuláš Karlík (CZE)	–	–	–	–	–	0	0	–	7	0	7
78	Anton Babikov (RUS)	–	0	0	7	0	–	0	–	–	–	7
79	Artem Tyshchenko (UKR)	–	–	–	–	0	0	–	6	0	0	6
80	Semen Suchilov (RUS)	5	0	–	–	–	–	–	–	–	–	5
81	Justus Strelow (GER)	–	–	–	–	–	–	–	–	–	4	4
82	Tommaso Giacomel (ITA)	–	–	–	–	0	3	–	0	0	0	3
83	Dimitar Gerdzhikov (BUL)	–	–	2	0	0	–	0	0	0	–	2
84	Šimon Bartko (SVK)	0	–	0	–	0	–	0	1	0	0	1
