= 2016–17 Biathlon World Cup – Sprint Men =

The 2016–17 Biathlon World Cup – Sprint Men started on Saturday 3 December 2016 in Östersund and finished on Friday 17 March 2017 in Oslo Holmenkollen. The defending titlist was Martin Fourcade of France.

The small crystal globe winner for the category was Martin Fourcade of France.

== Competition format ==
The 10 kilometres (6.2 mi) sprint race is the third oldest biathlon event; the distance is skied over three laps. The biathlete shoots two times at any shooting lane, first prone, then standing, totalling 10 targets. For each missed target the biathlete has to complete a penalty lap of around 150 metres (490 ft). Competitors' starts are staggered, normally by 30 seconds.

== 2015–16 Top 3 standings ==
Medal	Athlete	Points
Gold:	(France) Martin Fourcade	379
Silver:	(Germany) Simon Schempp	316
Bronze:	(Norway) Johannes Thingnes Bø	298

== Medal winners ==
Event	Gold	Time	Silver	Time	Bronze	Time
Östersund details	Martin Fourcade; France	23:31.9 (0+0)	Fredrik Lindström; Sweden	24:13.4 (0+0)	Arnd Peiffer; Germany	24:15.5 (0+0)
Pokljuka details	Martin Fourcade; France	23:11.7 (0+0)	Johannes Thingnes Bø; Norway	23:25.4 (0+0)	Anton Shipulin; Russia	23:26.8 (0+0)
Nové Město details	Martin Fourcade; France	23:48.0 (0+1)	Anton Shipulin; Russia	23:49.6 (0+0)	Emil Hegle Svendsen; Norway	23:54.4 (0+1)
Oberhof details	Julian Eberhard; Austria	27:26.8 (1+0)	Michal Šlesingr; Czech Republic	27:37.6 (0+1)	Dominik Windisch; Italy	28:07.1 (0+1)
Ruhpolding details	Martin Fourcade; France	22:34.2 (0+0)	Julian Eberhard; Austria	22:52.2 (0+0)	Emil Hegle Svendsen; Norway	23:13.9 (0+0)
World Championships details	Benedikt Doll; Germany	23:27.4 (0+0)	Johannes Thingnes Bø; Norway	23:28.1 (0+0)	Martin Fourcade; France	23:50.5 (1+1)
Pyeongchang details	Julian Eberhard; Austria	23:11.1 (0+0)	Lowell Bailey; United States	23:51.8 (0+0)	Martin Fourcade; France	23:56.5 (1+1)
Kontiolahti details	Martin Fourcade; France	22:17.0 (0+1)	Ondřej Moravec; Czech Republic	22:17.6 (0+0)	Emil Hegle Svendsen; Norway	22:26.4 (0+0)
Oslo Holmenkollen details	Johannes Thingnes Bø; Norway	24:53.3 (0+0)	Martin Fourcade; France	25:06.9 (0+1)	Anton Shipulin; Russia	25:14.6 (0+0)

== Standings ==
#	Name	ÖST	POK	NOV	OBE	RUH	HOC	PYE	KON	OSL	Total
1	Martin Fourcade (FRA)	60	60	60	34	60	48	48	60	54	484
2	Julian Eberhard (AUT)	40	0	32	60	54	36	60	32	31	345
3	Emil Hegle Svendsen (NOR)	27	43	48	36	48	5	—	48	21	276
4	Arnd Peiffer (GER)	48	22	30	26	43	29	10	40	27	275
5	Johannes Thingnes Bø (NOR)	11	54	43	DNS	4	54	—	43	60	269
6	Anton Shipulin (RUS)	13	48	54	17	18	20	18	12	48	248
7	Benedikt Doll (GER)	43	20	16	0	21	60	21	11	30	222
8	Ole Einar Bjørndalen (NOR)	29	36	27	9	34	34	15	34	0	218
9	Lowell Bailey (USA)	28	23	21	—	23	43	54	25	0	217
10	Dominik Landertinger (AUT)	8	0	—	30	32	24	43	30	43	210
11	Simon Schempp (GER)	20	38	24	38	40	32	—	—	17	209
12	Ondřej Moravec (CZE)	6	10	34	22	0	40	—	54	36	202
13	Dominik Windisch (ITA)	38	0	20	48	0	23	38	24	1	192
14	Erik Lesser (GER)	26	34	26	40	14	4	40	—	0	184
15	Simon Eder (AUT)	17	30	0	0	—	19	34	38	29	167
16	Andrejs Rastorgujevs (LAT)	23	0	38	—	19	0	26	36	18	160
17	Michal Šlesingr (CZE)	24	26	0	54	0	0	17	6	28	155
18	Maxim Tsvetkov (RUS)	31	28	29	28	10	0	27	0	DNS	153
19	Simon Desthieux (FRA)	34	21	6	0	—	7	30	17	32	147
20	Evgeniy Garanichev (RUS)	0	6	0	—	22	31	32	18	34	143
21	Dmytro Pidruchnyi (UKR)	32	0	19	DNS	36	13	25	15	0	140
22	Serhiy Semenov (UKR)	4	16	36	27	0	0	16	0	40	139
23	Jean-Guillaume Béatrix (FRA)	18	14	10	25	8	14	24	0	22	135
24	Lukas Hofer (ITA)	1	0	9	43	0	0	29	26	20	128
25	Quentin Fillon Maillet (FRA)	0	40	25	14	15	0	9	0	25	128
26	Serafin Wiestner (SUI)	15	24	17	0	0	23	36	0	12	127
27	Fredrik Lindström (SWE)	54	—	0	7	28	11	—	0	26	126
28	Vladimir Iliev (BUL)	0	0	40	31	13	28	0	8	0	120
29	Michal Krčmář (CZE)	3	32	13	20	12	0	0	27	13	120
30	Klemen Bauer (SLO)	0	29	4	0	27	8	0	21	24	113
#	Name	ÖST	POK	NOV	OBE	RUH	HOC	PYE	KON	OSL	Total
31	Krasimir Anev (BUL)	0	15	3	—	11	38	0	20	23	110
32	Benjamin Weger (SUI)	16	17	0	32	30	0	0	1	14	110
33	Anton Babikov (RUS)	36	20	0	23	18	0	0	3	0	100
34	Daniel Mesotitsch (AUT)	5	27	15	16	26	0	—	10	0	99
35	Erlend Bjøntegaard (NOR)	19	3	31	11	20	—	0	—	—	84
36	Sebastian Samuelsson (SWE)	22	11	28	—	5	0	0	16	0	82
37	Matvey Eliseev (RUS)	25	31	0	0	0	—	—	14	10	80
38	Artem Pryma (UKR)	21	2	18	0	6	—	31	0	2	80
39	Michael Rösch (BEL)	0	25	11	5	7	0	0	31	0	79
40	Lars Helge Birkeland (NOR)	14	9	5	—	31	—	—	20	—	79
41	Dmitry Malyshko (RUS)	10	—	0	30	38	—	—	0	—	78
42	Tarjei Bø (NOR)	—	—	—	—	—	27	—	9	38	74
43	Scott Gow (CAN)	0	18	23	0	0	16	14	0	0	71
44	Simon Fourcade (FRA)	31	12	0	—	0	0	20	0	0	63
45	Roman Rees (GER)	0	—	—	—	—	—	28	29	5	62
46	Vetle Sjåstad Christiansen (NOR)	—	—	—	10	—	—	23	28	0	61
47	Mario Dolder (SUI)	0	13	1	0	16	26	0	5	0	61
48	Tim Burke (USA)	12	0	DNS	6	29	1	—	—	—	48
49	Matthias Bischl (GER)	—	—	0	19	25	—	—	—	—	44
50	Cornel Puchianu (ROU)	0	7	0	0	0	21	0	0	15	43
51	Vladimir Chepelin (BLR)	0	0	8	0	24	0	7	0	—	39
52	Vitaliy Kilchytskyy (UKR)	7	0	14	18	0	—	—	—	—	39
53	Florian Graf (GER)	0	0	—	0	—	—	12	22	—	34
54	Adam Václavík (CZE)	0	0	—	24	2	7	0	0	0	33
55	Henrik L'Abée-Lund (NOR)	0	0	—	21	0	—	3	—	8	32
56	Tomas Kaukėnas (LTU)	0	0	0	0	9	10	0	13	0	32
57	Tomáš Hasilla (SVK)	0	6	0	—	0	25	0	0	0	31
58	Anton Sinapov (BUL)	0	0	0	0	0	30	0	0	0	30
59	Sergey Bocharnikov (BLR)	—	0	—	0	0	0	11	0	19	30
60	Lorenz Wäger (AUT)	—	—	0	—	—	—	20	0	9	29
#	Name	ÖST	POK	NOV	OBE	RUH	HOC	PYE	KON	OSL	Total
61	Brendan Green (CAN)	9	0	0	0	0	3	13	0	0	25
62	Timofey Lapshin (KOR)	—	—	—	—	—	—	—	23	0	23
63	Tomáš Krupčík (CZE)	—	0	—	—	—	—	22	—	—	22
64	Jaroslav Soukup (CZE)	0	—	22	0	0	—	0	0	0	22
65	Yan Savitskiy (KAZ)	0	0	0	1	0	17	0	4	—	22
66	Leif Nordgren (USA)	—	—	—	—	0	15	4	0	0	19
67	Remus Faur (ROU)	0	0	0	0	0	18	0	0	0	18
68	Christian Gow (CAN)	0	8	DNS	0	0	9	0	0	0	17
69	Fredrik Gjesbakk (NOR)	—	—	0	—	—	—	0	—	16	16
70	Grzegorz Guzik (POL)	0	0	0	15	0	0	0	0	0	15
71	Vladimir Semakov (UKR)	0	—	—	13	0	0	0	0	0	13
72	David Komatz (AUT)	—	—	12	0	0	—	—	—	0	12
73	Martin Jäger (SUI)	—	—	—	12	—	—	—	—	0	12
74	Kauri Kõiv (EST)	0	0	0	0	—	12	0	—	0	12
75	Alexey Volkov (RUS)	—	—	—	—	—	—	—	—	11	11
76	Sean Doherty (USA)	—	—	—	0	1	2	0	0	6	9
77	Maksim Varabei (BLR)	0	0	0	0	—	0	8	0	0	8
78	Yury Shopin (RUS)	—	0	—	8	—	—	0	—	—	8
79	Raman Yaliotnau (BLR)	0	0	7	0	0	0	—	—	—	7
80	Philipp Nawrath (GER)	—	—	—	—	—	—	—	7	0	7
81	Miha Dovzan (SLO)	—	0	0	0	0	0	0	0	7	7
82	Jeremy Finello (SUI)	0	0	0	—	—	0	6	0	—	6
83	Giuseppe Montello (ITA)	0	0	0	0	0	0	5	0	0	5
84	Thomas Bormolini (ITA)	0	0	0	0	0	0	0	0	4	4
85	Krešimir Crnković (CRO)	0	0	0	4	0	0	—	—	—	4
86	Matthias Dorfer (GER)	—	4	0	—	—	—	—	—	—	4
87	Felix Leitner (AUT)	0	2	0	2	0	—	—	—	—	4
88	Olli Hiidensalo (FIN)	0	0	2	—	0	0	—	2	0	4
89	Antonin Guigonnat (FRA)	—	—	—	3	—	—	—	—	—	3
89	Alexandr Loginov (RUS)	—	—	—	—	—	—	—	—	3	3
#	Name	ÖST	POK	NOV	OBE	RUH	HOC	PYE	KON	OSL	Total
89	Michael Willeitner (GER)	—	—	—	—	3	—	—	—	—	3
92	Fabien Claude (FRA)	2	0	—	0	0	—	0	0	1	3
93	Dimitar Gerdzhikov (BUL)	0	0	0	0	0	0	2	0	0	2
94	Vegard Gjermundshaug (NOR)	—	—	—	—	—	—	1	—	—	1
