= Biathlon World Championships 2019 – Men's relay =

Men's relay at the Biathlon World Championships 2019
- Venue: Östersund Ski Stadium
- Location: Östersund, Sweden
- Dates: 16 March
- Competitors: 104 from 26 nations
- Teams: 26
- Winning time: 1:12:03.7

Medalists
gold medal	Lars Helge Birkeland; Vetle Sjåstad Christiansen; Tarjei Bø; Johannes Thingnes Bø	Norway
silver medal	Erik Lesser; Roman Rees; Arnd Peiffer; Benedikt Doll	Germany
bronze medal	Matvey Eliseev; Nikita Porshnev; Dmitry Malyshko; Alexander Loginov	Russia

The men's relay competition at the Biathlon World Championships 2019 was held on 16 March 2019.

== Results ==
The race was started at 16:30.

Rank	Bib	Team	Time	Penalties (P+S)	Deficit
1st place, gold medalist(s)	1	Norway; Lars Helge Birkeland; Vetle Sjåstad Christiansen; Tarjei Bø; Johannes Thingnes Bø	1:12:03.7; 17:44.0; 17:46.4; 18:06.0; 18:27.3	0+1 0+5; 0+1 0+0; 0+0 0+0; 0+0 0+2; 0+0 0+3	
2nd place, silver medalist(s)	4	Germany; Erik Lesser; Roman Rees; Arnd Peiffer; Benedikt Doll	1:12:41.8; 17:37.8; 18:30.6; 18:11.5; 18:21.9	0+3 0+5; 0+1 0+1; 0+1 0+2; 0+0 0+1; 0+1 0+1	+38.1
3rd place, bronze medalist(s)	2	Russia; Matvey Eliseev; Nikita Porshnev; Dmitry Malyshko; Alexander Loginov	1:13:07.8; 17:34.4; 18:59.2; 18:25.7; 18:08.5	0+3 0+4; 0+0 0+2; 0+1 0+1; 0+2 0+1; 0+0 0+0	+1:04.1
4	7	Czech Republic; Michal Šlesingr; Ondřej Moravec; Tomáš Krupčík; Michal Krčmář	1:13:24.4; 18:03.5; 18:37.9; 18:13.4; 18:29.6	0+3 0+3; 0+0 0+2; 0+2 0+0; 0+0 0+0; 0+1 0+1	+1:20.7
5	19	Slovenia; Miha Dovžan; Jakov Fak; Klemen Bauer; Rok Tršan	1:13:26.1; 18:26.4; 17:57.8; 18:16.7; 18:45.2	0+2 0+3; 0+2 0+1; 0+0 0+0; 0+0 0+2; 0+0 0+0	+1:22.4
6	3	France; Antonin Guigonnat; Quentin Fillon Maillet; Simon Desthieux; Martin Fourcade	1:13:40.9; 17:35.3; 17:53.8; 18:50.8; 19:21.0	0+3 3+8; 0+1 0+2; 0+1 0+0; 0+1 1+3; 0+0 2+3	+1:37.2
7	6	Sweden; Fredrik Lindström; Jesper Nelin; Martin Ponsiluoma; Sebastian Samuelsson	1:13:41.1; 17:43.3; 18:04.6; 18:52.7; 19:00.5	0+7 0+4; 0+1 0+0; 0+2 0+1; 0+1 0+1; 0+3 0+2	+1:37.4
8	5	Austria; Felix Leitner; Simon Eder; Dominik Landertinger; Julian Eberhard	1:14:03.8; 17:42.8; 18:15.0; 18:57.3; 19:08.7	0+3 1+5; 0+0 0+1; 0+0 0+0; 0+3 0+1; 0+0 1+3	+2:00.1
9	18	Bulgaria; Krasimir Anev; Anton Sinapov; Dimitar Gerdzhikov; Vladimir Iliev	1:14:07.6; 17:55.8; 18:30.4; 19:05.9; 18:35.5	0+5 0+4; 0+0 0+1; 0+1 0+2; 0+3 0+0; 0+1 0+1	+2:03.9
10	12	Belarus; Anton Smolski; Raman Yaliotnau; Sergey Bocharnikov; Vladimir Chepelin	1:14:07.7; 17:43.7; 18:23.5; 18:57.5; 19:03.0	0+4 0+5; 0+1 0+1; 0+3 0+0; 0+0 0+1; 0+0 0+3	+2:04.0
11	9	Switzerland; Jeremy Finello; Benjamin Weger; Mario Dolder; Serafin Wiestner	1:15:12.1; 17:41.5; 18:27.6; 19:22.8; 19:40.2	0+5 2+7; 0+0 0+0; 0+3 0+1; 0+1 1+3; 0+1 1+3	+3:08.4
12	10	Ukraine; Artem Pryma; Serhiy Semenov; Artem Tyshchenko; Ruslan Tkalenko	1:15:12.4; 17:50.5; 19:33.9; 18:46.7; 19:01.3	0+1 0+6; 0+0 0+1; 0+1 0+3; 0+0 0+0; 0+0 0+2	+3:08.7
13	14	Canada; Christian Gow; Scott Gow; Aidan Millar; Jules Burnotte	1:15:14.4; 17:43.2; 18:33.6; 19:28.9; 19:28.7	0+1 0+5; 0+0 0+0; 0+1 0+1; 0+0 0+3; 0+0 0+1	+3:10.7
14	13	Estonia; Rene Zahkna; Kalev Ermits; Roland Lessing; Kauri Kõiv	1:15:30.1; 17:52.8; 18:13.4; 19:50.5; 19:33.4	0+7 0+4; 0+1 0+1; 0+1 0+0; 0+3 0+2; 0+2 0+1	+3:26.4
15	8	Italy; Lukas Hofer; Giuseppe Montello; Thomas Bormolini; Dominik Windisch	1:15:35.9; 17:35.3; 18:53.3; 18:45.4; 20:21.9	2+3 0+10; 0+0 0+2; 0+0 0+3; 0+0 0+3; 2+3 0+2	+3:32.2
16	16	Poland; Łukasz Szczurek; Grzegorz Guzik; Andrzej Nędza-Kubiniec; Mateusz Janik	1:16:11.4; 18:21.1; 18:44.1; 18:56.3; 20:09.9	0+4 1+4; 0+2 0+0; 0+1 0+1; 0+0 0+0; 0+1 1+3	+4:07.7
17	22	Finland; Jaakko Ranta; Tero Seppälä; Tuomas Grönman; Olli Hiidensalo	1:16:13.2; 19:15.8; 18:32.3; 19:06.9; 19:18.2	0+5 0+4; 0+1 0+2; 0+2 0+0; 0+0 0+1; 0+2 0+1	+4:09.5
18	11	Slovakia; Michal Šíma; Matej Kazár; Tomáš Hasilla; Martin Otčenáš	1:17:28.8; 19:26.5; 18:58.1; 19:48.0; 19:16.2	0+4 2+10; 0+3 1+3; 0+1 0+2; 0+0 1+3; 0+0 0+2	+5:25.1
19	15	United States; Leif Nordgren; Jake Brown; Alex Howe; Max Durtschi	1:17:30.3; 18:27.6; 18:42.6; 19:25.2; 20:54.9	0+6 2+6; 0+3 0+1; 0+1 0+1; 0+1 0+1; 0+1 2+3	+5:26.6
20	20	Japan; Mikito Tachizaki; Tsukasa Kobonoki; Kosuke Ozaki; Kazuya Inomata	1:17:31.6; 18:38.3; 19:09.8; 19:17.0; 20:26.5	0+1 0+5; 0+0 0+2; 0+0 0+3; 0+1 0+0; 0+0 0+0	+5:27.9
21	25	Lithuania; Tomas Kaukėnas; Karol Dombrovski; Vytautas Strolia; Linas Banys	1:17:42.1; 18:30.3; 19:28.9; 18:56.1; 20:46.8	0+3 0+5; 0+1 0+0; 0+0 0+2; 0+1 0+2; 0+1 0+1	+5:38.4
22	21	Romania; George Buta; Cornel Puchianu; Raul Antonio Flore; Denis Șerban	1:18:09.1; 18:41.9; 19:11.1; 19:37.9; 20:38.2	0+2 0+5; 0+0 0+0; 0+1 0+2; 0+1 0+1; 0+0 0+2	+6:05.4
23	17	Belgium; Florent Claude; Thierry Langer; Tom Lahaye-Goffart; César Beauvais	LAP; 18:26.0; 19:58.4	0+4 0+2; 0+0 0+0; 0+3 0+2; 0+1 0+0	
24	26	Latvia; Aleksandrs Patrijuks; Edgars Mise; Roberts Slotiņš; Andrejs Rastorgujevs	LAP; 18:29.2; 19:54.7	0+4 1+5; 0+0 0+2; 0+3 0+0; 0+1 1+3	
25	24	Kazakhstan; Roman Yeremin; Timur Kuts; Petr Yermolenko; Sergey Sirik	LAP; 18:56.4; 19:35.7	1+5 1+6; 1+3 0+2; 0+2 0+1; 0+0 1+3	
26	23	South Korea; Timofey Lapshin; Choi Du-jin; Lee Su-young; Kim Yong-gyu	LAP; 18:54.0; 21:00.4	0+3 2+8; 0+0 1+3; 0+3 0+2; 0+0 1+3	
