= Biathlon at the 2015 Winter Universiade =

Biathlon at the 2015 Winter Universiade was held in Osrblie from January 25 to January 31, 2015.

== Men's events ==
| Event | Gold | | Silver | | Bronze | |
|---|---|---|---|---|---|---|
| 10 km sprint | (Russia) Iaroslav Ivanov | 23:17.3 | (Russia) Maksim Burtasov | 23:30.7 | (Russia) Yuri Shopin | 23:32.2 |
| 12.5 km pursuit | (Russia) Yuri Shopin | 30:25.5 | (Russia) Iaroslav Ivanov | 30:27.0 | (Russia) Maksim Burtasov | 31:08.1 |
| 15 km mass start | (Ukraine) Vitaliy Kilchytskyy | 43:17.1 | (Ukraine) Dmytro Rusinov | 43:28.1 | (Russia) Yuri Shopin | 43:46.6 |
| 20 km individual | (Ukraine) Dmytro Rusinov | 49:52.8 | (Russia) Vadim Filimonov | 50:15.4 | (Russia) Yuri Shopin | 51:18.0 |

== Women's events ==
| Event | Gold | | Silver | | Bronze | |
|---|---|---|---|---|---|---|
| 7.5 km sprint | (Slovakia) Paulína Fialková | 20:20.8 | (Russia) Evgenia Pavlova | 20:50.3 | (Czech Republic) Jitka Landová | 20:55.7 |
| 10 km pursuit | (Russia) Evgenia Pavlova | 30;45.1 | (Slovakia) Paulína Fialková | 31:23.3 | (Russia) Kristina Smirnova | 32:30.9 |
| 12.5 km mass start | (Czech Republic) Jitka Landová | 40:00.5 | (Czech Republic) Eva Puskarčíková | 40;55.7 | (Ukraine) Iana Bondar | 41:06.0 |
| 15 km individual | (Kazakhstan) Alina Raikova | 47:29.4 | (Russia) Ekaterina Avvakumova | 47:38.4 | (Slovakia) Paulína Fialková | 48:11.1 |

== Mixed events ==
| Event | Gold | | Silver | | Bronze | |
|---|---|---|---|---|---|---|
| 2 x 6 km + 2 x 7.5 km relay | (Russia) Russia; Kristina Smirnova; Evgenia Pavlova; Vadim Filimonov; Yuri Shopin | 1:36:38.4 | (Kazakhstan) Kazakhstan; Galina Vishnevskaya; Anna Kistanova; Maxim Braun; Vassiliy Podkorytov | 1:37:11.6 | (Ukraine) Ukraine; Yuliya Brygynets; Iana Bondar; Ruslan Tkalenko; Dmytro Rusinov | 1:37:27.6 |

== Medal table ==
* Host nation (Slovakia)

| Rank | Nation | Gold | Silver | Bronze | Total |
|---|---|---|---|---|---|
| 1 | Russia | 4 | 5 | 5 | 14 |
| 2 | Ukraine | 2 | 1 | 2 | 5 |
| 3 | Czech Republic | 1 | 1 | 1 | 3 |
| 3 | Slovakia* | 1 | 1 | 1 | 3 |
| 5 | Kazakhstan | 1 | 1 | 0 | 2 |
| Totals (5 entries) | | 9 | 9 | 9 | 27 |
