= Nadiia Bielkina =

Ukrainian biathlete

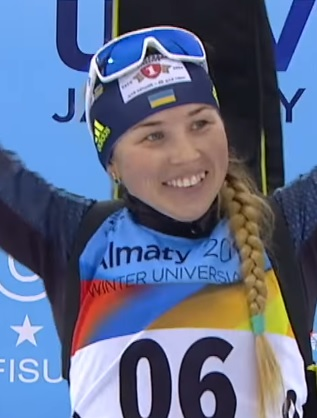

Personal information
- Born: 30 September 1990 (age 36) Zvenigovo, Mari El, Russia
- Height: 1.57 m (5 ft 2 in)

Sport
- Sport: Skiing
- Club: Kolos

World Cup career
- Seasons: 2005–2011 (for Russia); 2012–2026 (for Ukraine)
Medal record
Women's biathlon
Representing Ukraine
Winter Universiade
Gold medal – first place	2017 Almaty	Pursuit
Bronze medal – third place	2017 Almaty	Individual
Bronze medal – third place	2017 Almaty	Mixed relay
- Updated on October 15, 2026

Nadiia Bielkina (Ukrainian: Белкiна Надія Mиколаïвна; born 30 September 1990) is Ukrainian former biathlete.

== Results ==
=== World Cup ===
==== Positions ====
Season	Individual	Sprint	Pursuit	Mass starts	TOTAL
2014–15		76			85
2015–16		74	78		81

=== IBU Cup ===
==== Individual podiums ====
Season	Place	Competition	Rank
2015–16	Martell-Val Martello, Italy	Sprint	1
2018–19	Idre, Sweden	Sprint	3
2018–19	Ridnaun-Val Ridanna, Italy	Sprint	3
2018–19	Duszniki-Zdrój, Poland	Sprint	3

==== Relay podiums ====
Season	Place	Competition	Rank
2015–16	Ridnaun-Val Ridanna, Italy	Mixed relay	1
2015–16	Arber, Germany	Mixed relay	1
2015–16	Martell-Val Martello, Italy	Mixed relay	3
