= Anton Pantov =

Kazakhstani biathlete (born 1991)

Personal information
- Born: 25 March 1991 (age 35)

Sport
- Sport: Skiing
Medal record
Men's biathlon
Representing Kazakhstan
Winter Universiade
Silver medal – second place	2017 Almaty	Mixed relay
Bronze medal – third place	2017 Almaty	Mass start
Asian Winter Games
Silver medal – second place	2017 Sapporo	Mixed relay

Anton Pantov (born 25 March 1991) is a Kazakhstani biathlete. He was born in the Pavlodar Region. He competed at the Biathlon World Championships 2012, and at the 2014 Winter Olympics in Sochi, in sprint and individual.
