= Biathlon at the 2019 Winter Universiade =

Biathlon at the XXIX Winter Universiade
- Dates: 4–10 March 2019

Biathlon at the 2019 Winter Universiade was held at the Biathlon Academy in Krasnoyarsk from 4 to 10 March 2019.

== Men's events ==
Event	Gold		Silver		Bronze	
20 km individual	(Russia) Nikita Porshnev	52:16.9 (0+2+0+0)	(Russia) Eduard Latypov	52:22.4 (1+1+0+0)	(France) Félix Cottet-Puinel	52:38.4 (0+0+0+0)
10 km sprint	(Russia) Eduard Latypov	25:01.2 (1+1)	(Russia) Dmitrii Ivanov	25:09.9 (0+0)	(Russia) Nikita Porshnev	25:11.5 (1+0)
12.5 km pursuit	(Russia) Dmitrii Ivanov	34:10.7 (0+0+0+0)	(Russia) Nikita Porshnev	34:24.9 (0+0+1+1)	(Russia) Eduard Latypov	35:17.0 (1+2+2+0)
15 km mass start	(Norway) Espen Uldal	40:18.7 (0+0+1+1)	(Belarus) Maksim Varabei	40:54.1 (0+1+0+2)	(Czech Republic) Adam Václavík	41:15.2 (1+3+0+0)

== Women's events ==
Event	Gold		Silver		Bronze	
15 km individual	(Russia) Natalia Gerbulova	46:10.6 (0+1+1+1)	(Russia) Ekaterina Moshkova	47:15.9 (1+1+2+0)	(Russia) Elena Chirkova	47:24.5 (0+0+1+1)
7.5 km sprint	(Russia) Ekaterina Moshkova	22:59.4 (0+2)	(Russia) Irina Kazakevich	23:02.3 (1+2)	(Russia) Tamara Voronina	23:24.1 (1+1)
10 km pursuit	(Russia) Ekaterina Moshkova	32:59.1 (1+1+1+0)	(Russia) Irina Kazakevich	33:16.5 (1+0+1+1)	(Russia) Tamara Voronina	34:04.4 (0+0+2+1)
12.5 km mass start	(Russia) Ekaterina Moshkova	42:05.7 (0+1+1+1)	(Russia) Elizaveta Kaplina	42:09.7 (0+0+2+0)	(Russia) Elena Chirkova	43:09.9 (1+1+0+1)

== Mixed Relay ==
Event	Gold		Silver		Bronze	
Single mixed relay	Russia; Valeria Vasnetsova; Aleksandr Dediukhin; Valeria Vasnetsova; Aleksandr Dediukhin	42:53.4 (1+3) (0+1) (0+1) (2+3) (1+3) (0+3) (0+2) (0+1)	Czech Republic; Natálie Jurčová; David Tolar; Natálie Jurčová; David Tolar	42:59.9 (0+2) (0+3) (0+1) (1+3) (0+3) (0+2) (0+0) (0+3)	France; Marine Challamel; Félix Cottet-Puinel; Marine Challamel; Félix Cottet-Puinel	43:45.2 (0+0) (2+3) (0+0) (0+0) (1+3) (2+3) (0+0) (0+1)

== Medal table ==
* Host nation (Russia)

Rank	Nation	Gold	Silver	Bronze	Total
1	Russia*	8	7	6	21
2	Norway	1	0	0	1
3	Czech Republic	0	1	1	2
4	Belarus	0	1	0	1
5	France	0	0	2	2
Totals (5 entries)		9	9	9	27
