= Franck Perrot =

French biathlete (born 1972)

Personal information
- Nationality: French
- Born: 7 February 1972 (age 54) Moûtiers, France

Sport
- Sport: Biathlon

Franck Perrot (French pronunciation: [fʁɑ̃k pɛʁo]; born 7 February 1972) is a French biathlete. He competed in the men's 20 km individual event at the 1994 Winter Olympics.

He is married to former Norwegian biathlete Tone Marit Oftedal, and is the father of French biathlete Eric Perrot.
