= Irina Kazakevich =

Russian biathlete

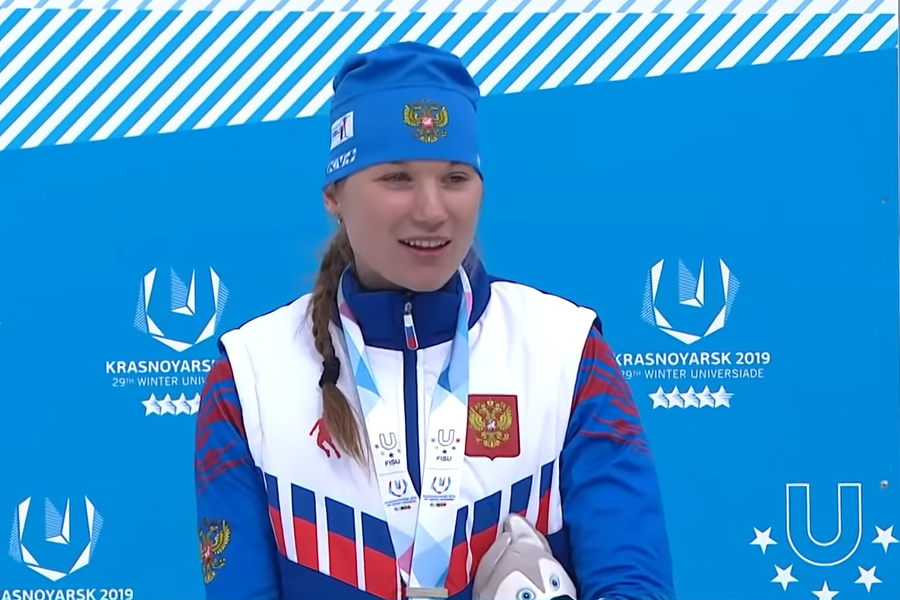

Personal information
- Nationality: (Russia) Russian
- Born: 29 October 1997 (age 28) Berdsk, Russia

Sport

Professional information
- Sport: Biathlon
- World Cup debut: 28 November 2020

Olympic Games
- Teams: 1 (2022)
- Medals: 1

World Championships
- Teams: 1 (2021)

World Cup
- Seasons: 1 (2020/21)
Medal record
Women's biathlon
Representing ROC
Olympic Games
Silver medal – second place	2022 Beijing	4 × 6 km relay
Representing Russia
Junior World Championships
Bronze medal – third place	2018 Otepää	12.5 km individual
Winter Universiade
Silver medal – second place	2019 Krasnoyarsk	7.5 km sprint
Silver medal – second place	2019 Krasnoyarsk	10 km pursuit

Irina Vladimirovna Kazakevich (Russian: Ирина Владимировна Казакевич; born 29 October 1997) is a Russian biathlete. She has competed in the Biathlon World Cup since 2020.

== Biathlon results ==
All results are sourced from the International Biathlon Union.

=== Olympic Games ===
1 medal (1 silver)

Event	Individual	Sprint	Pursuit	Mass start	Relay	Mixed relay
Representing ROC Russian Olympic Committee
(China) 2022 Beijing	―	20th	23rd	20th	Silver	―

=== World Championships ===
Event	Individual	Sprint	Pursuit	Mass start	Relay	Mixed relay	Single mixed relay
Representing Russian Biathlon Union
(Slovenia) 2021 Pokljuka	—	19th	23rd	20th	—	—	—
