= Biathlon at the 2017 Winter Universiade =

Biathlon at the XXVIII Winter Universiade
- Venue: Alatau Cross-Country Skiing & Biathlon Complex
- Dates: 31 January – 7 February

Biathlon at the 2017 Winter Universiade was held in Alatau Cross-Country Skiing & Biathlon Complex, Almaty from 31 January to 7 February 2017.

== Men's events ==
Event	Gold		Silver		Bronze	
20 km individual	(France) Baptiste Jouty	1:03:41.0	(Russia) Sergey Korastylev	1:04:22.0	(Russia) Semen Suchilov	1:04:46.5
10 km sprint	(Russia) Semen Suchilov	27:02.3	(Russia) Dmitrii Ivanov	27:24.1	(Kazakhstan) Roman Yeryomin	27:24.6
12.5 km pursuit	(Russia) Sergey Korastylev	32:08.3	(Russia) Dmitrii Ivanov	32:19.2	(Russia) Semen Suchilov	32:26.9
15 km mass start	(France) Baptiste Jouty	43:30.0	(Kazakhstan) Roman Yeryomin	43:43.5	(Kazakhstan) Anton Pantov	43:57.7

== Women's events ==
Event	Gold		Silver		Bronze	
15 km individual	(Kazakhstan) Alina Raikova	59:48.7	(Kazakhstan) Galina Vishnevskaya	1:02:09.8	(Ukraine) Nadiia Bielkina	1:02:12.3
7.5 km sprint	(Kazakhstan) Galina Vishnevskaya	21:43.1	(Ukraine) Iana Bondar	22:05.9	(Russia) Anastasiia Egorova	22:19.8
10 km pursuit	(Ukraine) Nadiia Bielkina	32:39.6	(Russia) Olga Shesterikova	33:00.7	(Russia) Larisa Kuklina	33:08.3
12.5 km mass start	(Kazakhstan) Galina Vishnevskaya	36:15.4	(Ukraine) Iana Bondar	37:17.7	(Russia) Larisa Kuklina	37:28.5

== Mixed events ==
Event	Gold		Silver		Bronze	
2 x 6 km + 2 x 7.5 km relay	Russia; Larisa Kuklina; Olga Shesterikova; Semen Suchilov; Sergey Korastylev	1:14:37.8	Kazakhstan; Galina Vishnevskaya; Darya Ussanova; Roman Yeryomin; Anton Pantov	1:15:08.4	Ukraine; Nadiia Bielkina; Iana Bondar; Maksym Ivko; Artem Tyshchenko	1:17:10.4

== Medal table ==
* Host nation (Kazakhstan)

Rank	Nation	Gold	Silver	Bronze	Total
1	Russia	3	4	5	12
2	Kazakhstan*	3	3	2	8
3	France	2	0	0	2
4	Ukraine	1	2	2	5
Totals (4 entries)		9	9	9	27
