= Iana Bondar =

Ukrainian biathlete (born 1991)

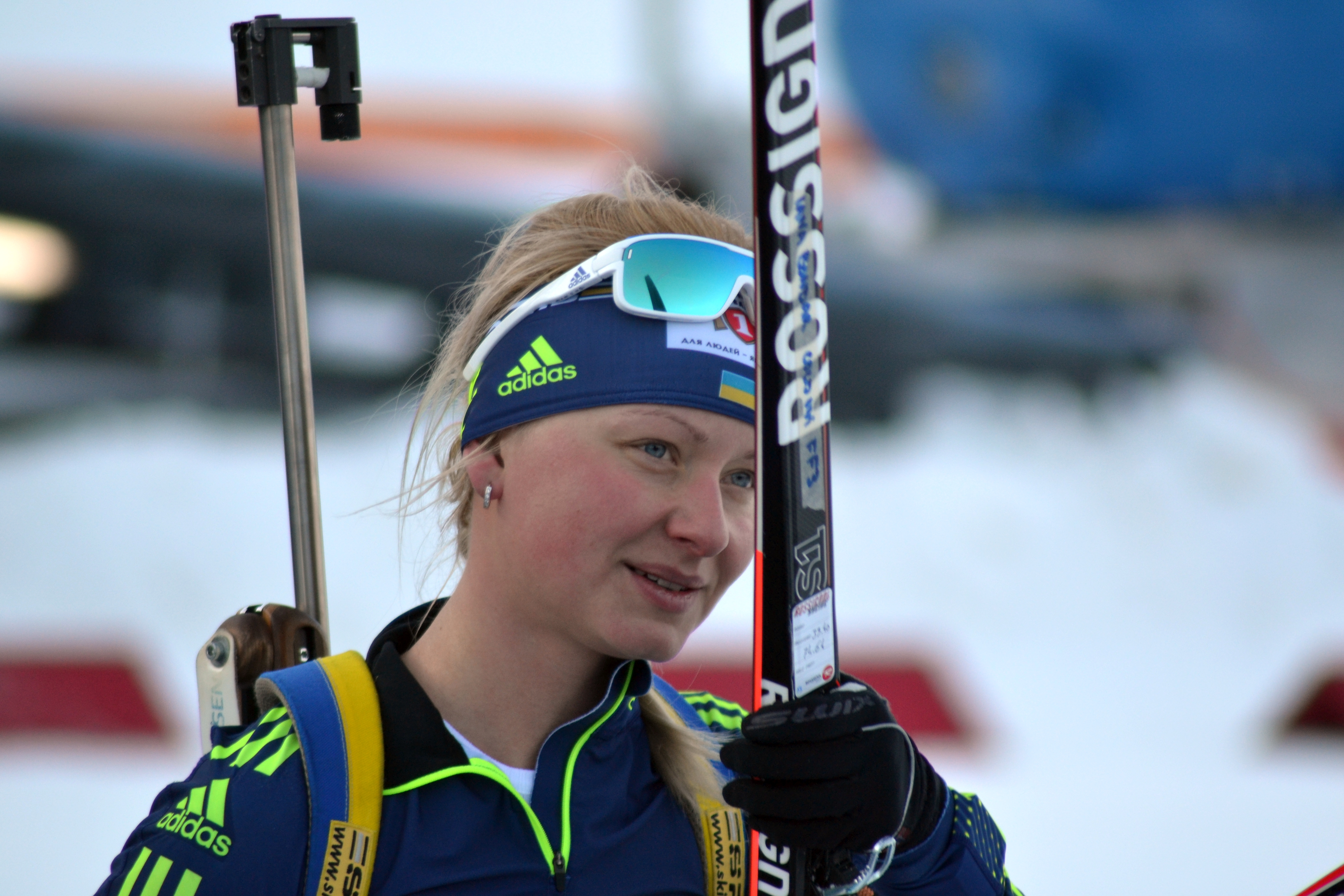

Personal information
- Full name: Iana Bondar
- Born: 19 February 1991 (age 35) Fursy, Bila Tserkva Raion, Kyiv Oblast, Ukraine

Sport
- Sport: Skiing

World Cup career
- Seasons: 2012-2019
Medal record
Women's biathlon
Representing Ukraine
Junior World Championships
Bronze medal – third place	2012 Kontiolahti	3 × 6 km relay
European Championships
Bronze medal – third place	2013 Bansko	4 x 6 km relay
Bronze medal – third place	2014 Nové Město	Sprint
Universiade
Silver medal – second place	2013 Trentino	Mixed relay
Silver medal – second place	2017 Almaty	Sprint
Silver medal – second place	2017 Almaty	Mass start
Bronze medal – third place	2015 Osrblie	Mixed relay
Bronze medal – third place	2015 Osrblie	Mass start
Bronze medal – third place	2017 Almaty	Mixed relay
- Updated on February 9, 2013

Iana Bondar (born 19 February 1991) is a Ukrainian former biathlete.

== Performances ==
Level	Year	Event	IN	SP	PU	MS	RL	MRL
EBCH	2012	Osrblie, Slovakia	27	41	28			
JBWCH	2012	Kontiolahti, Finland	23	15	22		3	
BWCH	2013	Nové Město na Moravě, Czech Republic		63				
EBCH	2013	Bansko, Bulgaria	28	16				
WU	2013	Trentino, Italy		17	8			2
EBCH	2014	Nové Město na Moravě, Czech Republic	18	3	13		6	
