= Nikita Porshnev =

Russian biathlete

Personal information
- Nationality: Russian
- Born: 5 March 1996 (age 30) Saratov, Russia

Sport

Professional information
- Sport: Biathlon
- Club: Ugra
- World Cup debut: 13 March 2019

World Championships
- Teams: 1 (2019)
- Medals: 1 (0 gold)

World Cup
- Seasons: 1 (2018/19–)
- All podiums: 1
Medal record
World Championships
Bronze medal – third place	2019 Östersund	4 × 7.5 km relay
European Championships
Silver medal – second place	2022 Arber	10 km sprint
Winter Universiade
Gold medal – first place	2019 Krasnoyarsk	20 km individual
Silver medal – second place	2019 Krasnoyarsk	12.5 km pursuit
Bronze medal – third place	2019 Krasnoyarsk	10 km sprint
World Youth Championships
Gold medal – first place	2015 Raubichi	3 × 7.5 km relay
Gold medal – first place	2016 Cheile Grădiştei	4 × 7.5 km relay
Silver medal – second place	2016 Cheile Grădiştei	12.5 km pursuit
World Junior Championships
Gold medal – first place	2017 Osrblie	4 × 7.5 km relay

Nikita Porshnev (born 5 March 1996) is a Russian biathlete.

He competed at the Biathlon World Championships 2019, winning a medal.

== Biathlon results ==
All results are sourced from the International Biathlon Union.

=== World Championships ===
1 medal (1 bronze)

Event	Individual	Sprint	Pursuit	Mass start	Relay	Mixed relay	Single mixed relay
(Sweden) 2019 Östersund	36th	—	—	—	Bronze	—	—
(Italy) 2020 Rasen-Antholz	11th	21st	39th	26th	4th	—	—

*During Olympic seasons competitions are only held for those events not included in the Olympic program.
