= Vadim Filimonov =

Russian politician (1931–2022)

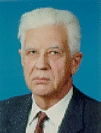

Member of the State Duma
- In office 11 January 1994 – 18 January 2000

Chairman of the State Duma Impeachment Commission
- In office 19 June 1998 – May 1999

Personal details
- Born: Vadim Donatovich Filimonov; 14 January 1931 Novosibirsk, Russian SFSR, Soviet Union
- Died: 12 September 2022 (aged 91) Moscow, Russia
- Party: CPRF
- Education: Tomsk State University
- Occupation: Legal scholar

Vadim Donatovich Filimonov (Russian: Вадим Донатович Филимонов; 14 January 1931 – 12 September 2022) was a Russian legal scholar and politician. A member of the Communist Party of the Russian Federation, he served in the State Duma from 1993 to 1999.

Filimonov died in Moscow on 12 September 2022, at the age of 91.
