= Maksim Varabei =

Belarusian biathlete (born 1995)

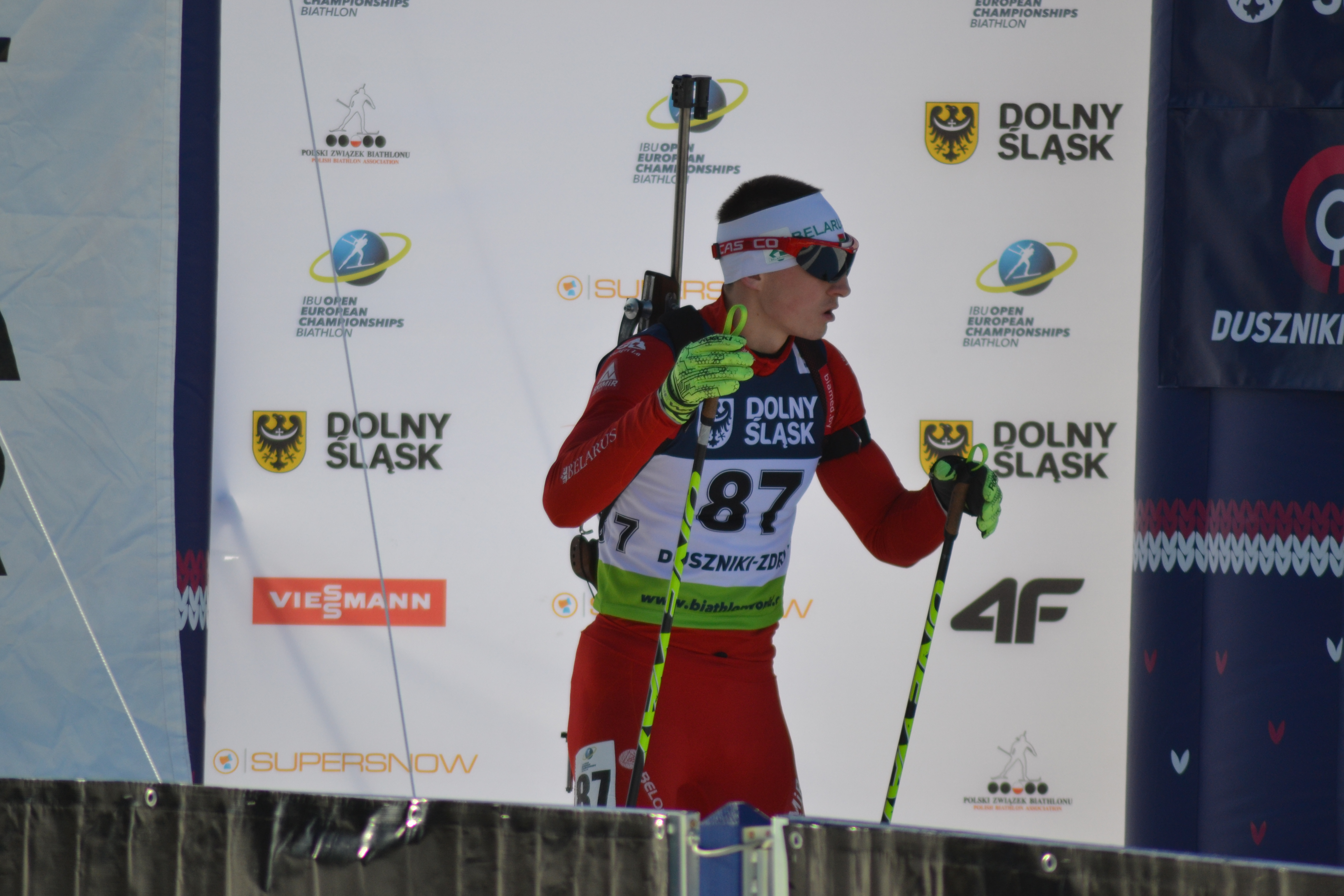
- Maksim Varabei in 2017

Personal information
- Nationality: Belarusian
- Born: 10 December 1995 (age 30) Borisov, Belarus

Sport
- Sport: Biathlon
Medal record
Representing Belarus
Winter Universiade
Silver medal – second place	2019 Krasnoyarsk	15km mass start

Maksim Varabei (Belarusian: Максім Варабей) (born 10 December 1995) is a Belarusian biathlete. He competed in the 2018 Winter Olympics.

== Career results ==
All results are sourced from the International Biathlon Union.

=== Olympic Games ===
0 medals

Event	Individual	Sprint	Pursuit	Mass start	Relay	Mixed relay
(South Korea) 2018 Pyeongchang	39th	—	—	—	—	—
(China) 2022 Beijing	86th	71st	—	—	8th	—

=== World Championships ===
0 medals

Event	Individual	Sprint	Pursuit	Mass start	Relay	Mixed relay	Single mixed relay
(Austria) 2017 Hochfilzen	—	82nd	—	—	19th	—	—
(Italy) 2020 Rasen-Antholz	79th	—	—	—	—	—	—
(Slovenia) 2021 Pokljuka	53rd	23rd	50th	—	9th	—	—
