= Roman Yeremin =

Kazakhstani biathlete (born 1997)

Personal information
- Full name: Roman Aleksandrovich Yeremin
- Nationality: Kazakhstani
- Born: 14 January 1997 (age 29)

Sport
- Sport: Biathlon
Medal record
Men's biathlon
Representing Kazakhstan
Junior World Championships
Bronze medal – third place	2017 Osrblie	10 km sprint

Roman Aleksandrovich Yeremin (Russian: Роман Александрович Ерёмин; born 14 January 1997) is a Kazakhstani biathlete. He competed in the 2018 Winter Olympics.

== Biathlon results ==
All results are sourced from the International Biathlon Union.

=== Olympic Games ===
0 medals

Event	Individual	Sprint	Pursuit	Mass start	Relay	Mixed relay
(South Korea) 2018 Pyeongchang	—	43rd	52nd	—	17th	18th

=== World Championships ===
0 medals

Event	Individual	Sprint	Pursuit	Mass start	Relay	Mixed relay	Single mixed relay
(Sweden) 2019 Östersund	54th	47th	DNS	—	25th	—	18th

*During Olympic seasons competitions are only held for those events not included in the Olympic program.
