= Adam Václavík =

Czech biathlete (born 1994)

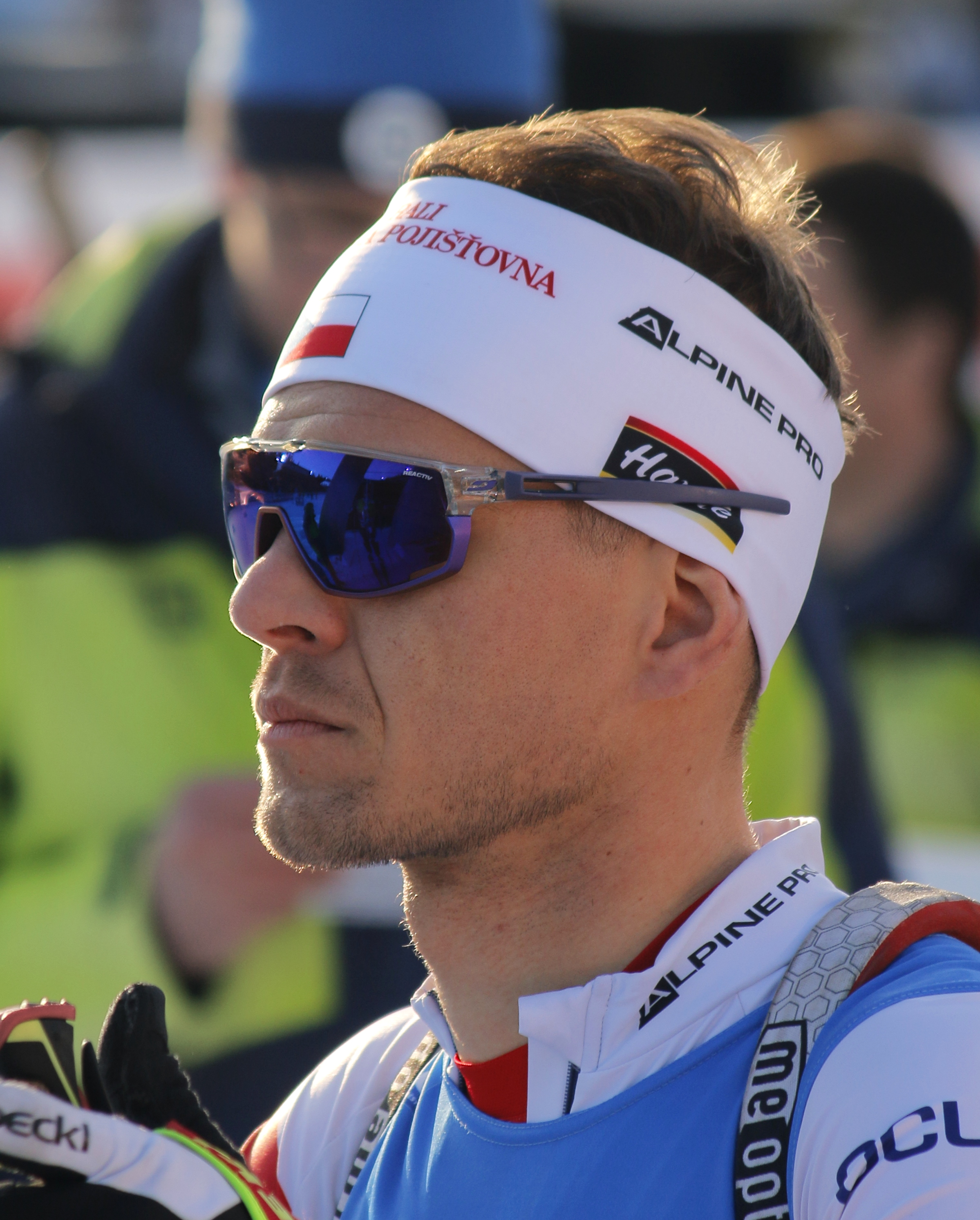
- Adam Václavík (2023)

Personal information
- Nationality: Czech
- Born: 18 February 1994 (age 32) Jilemnice, Czech Republic

Sport
- Country: Czech Republic
- Sport: Biathlon
Medal record
Representing Czech Republic
European Championships
Silver medal – second place	2020 Raubichi	Super sprint
Winter Universiade
Bronze medal – third place	2019 Krasnoyarsk	15km mass start

Adam Václavík (born 18 February 1994) is a Czech biathlete. He has competed in the Biathlon World Cup.

== Biathlon results ==
All results are sourced from the International Biathlon Union.

=== Olympic Games ===
0 medals

Event	Individual	Sprint	Pursuit	Mass start	Relay	Mixed relay
(South Korea) 2018 Pyeongchang	67th	73rd	—	—	—	—
(China) 2022 Beijing	—	59th	44th	—	19th	—

=== World Championships ===
0 medals

Event	Individual	Sprint	Pursuit	Mass start	Relay	Mixed relay	Single mixed relay
(Austria) 2017 Hochfilzen	—	34th	54th	—	—	—	—
(Italy) 2020 Rasen-Antholz	—	64th	—	—	—	—	—
(Germany) 2023 Oberhof	81st	24th	51st	—	—	—	—

*During Olympic seasons competitions are only held for those events not included in the Olympic program.
**The single mixed relay was added as an event in 2019.
