= 2017 Winter Universiade =

Multi-sport event in Almaty, Kazakhstan

XXVIII Winter Universiade XXVIII Qysqy Universiada
- Host city: Almaty, Kazakhstan
- Motto: "Spread Your Wings!"
- Nations: 56
- Athletes: 1,604
- Events: 85
- Opening: 29 January 2017
- Closing: 8 February 2017
- Opened by: Nursultan Nazarbayev
- Athlete's Oath: Aiza Mambekova
- Judge's Oath: Askar Valiyev
- Torch lighter: 16 well known Kazakh athletes
- Main venue: Almaty Ice Palace
- Website: almaty2017.com (archived)

Winter

Summer

Winter Universiade 2017, the XXVIII Winter Universiade, was a multi-sport winter event which took place in Almaty, Kazakhstan from 29 January to 8 February 2017. On 29 November 2011, FISU announced that Winter Universiade 2017 would be hosted in Almaty.

Student-athletes from all over the world between the ages of 17 and 28 arrived in Almaty to take part in Winter Universiade organized by FISU.

== Host selection ==
There were two candidates to host the event.

- Almaty. This is the third time that a former soviet country has hosted the Winter Universiade. Russia hosted two times the Summer Universiade – Moscow (1973), Kazan (2013) and hosted the Winter Universiade two years later in Krasnoyarsk.
- Trentino, Italy. Until 2011, Italy hosted the Universiade 9 times (4 Summer Universiades and 5 Winter Universiades). A week before the announcement of results of the bidding campaign, in connection with the economic crisis, the Italian government decided to withdraw its candidacy.As

«Given the difficult economic situation in Italy and the high financial obligations to the International Federation for the moment, the Council of the Autonomous Province of Trento sees no possibility to raise funds for the 2017 Winter Universiade in and therefore removed the candidature of the province.»

Later Trentino was invited to host the 2013 Winter Universiade, after Maribor withdrew to host the event, as the province didn't even need to build a specific competition venue for the event and the candidacy had an excellent technical level.

Formal decision on the Winter Universiade at the city was taken on a vote of the International University Sports Federation (FISU) on November 29, 2011, which was held in Brussels (Belgium).

Thus, due to the lack of competitors, Almaty was acclaimed the host city of the 28th Winter Universiade in 2017.

== Sports ==
As the FISU regulations determine, the Organizing Committee of each edition can choose up to 3 optional sports for each edition and the Almaty 2017 Organizing Committee chose: Nordic combined, ski jumping and speed skating.

Numbers in parentheses indicate the number of medal events contested in each sport.

- Alpine skiing (9)
- Biathlon (9)
- Cross-country skiing (11)
- Curling (2)
- Figure skating (3)
- Freestyle skiing (9)
- Ice hockey (2)
- Nordic combined (3)
- Short track speed skating (8)
- Ski jumping (5)
- Snowboarding (10)
- Speed skating (14)

== Venues ==
=== Almaty ===
Earlier it was reported that Kazakhstan would spend $950 million on Winter Universiade 2017. An Ice Palace, two ice rinks, an Athletic Village and international airport terminal and many more other sport and non-sport venues were to be built in Almaty for the event. The cost is considered small, and it is because some of the objects had already been built for the 7th Asian Winter Games, part of the competition which also took place in Almaty, and certain existing and remodeled venues. Kazakhstan chose bandy, ski jumping, Nordic combined, freestyle skiing and speed skating as optional sports, with bandy being in the form of demonstration. However, after tightening the budget, bandy was removed.

Venue	Sports	Capacity	Ref.
Almaty Ice Palace	Ice hockey	12,000	
Halyk Arena	Curling	5,000	
Medeu Alpine Ice Arena	Speed skating	25,000	
Shymbulak Alpine Sport Resort	Alpine skiing	10,000	
Sunkar International Ski Jumping Complex	Ski jumping, Nordic combined	20,000	

=== Almaty Region ===
Venue	Sports	Capacity	Ref.
Alatau Biathlon and Cross-Country Ski Complex	Biathlon, Cross-country skiing	12,600	
Tabagan Alpine Resort and CSKA Alpine Base	Freestyle skiing, Snowboarding	12,000	

== Schedule ==
The competition schedule for the 2017 Winter Universiade is shown as follows: The opening ceremony of the 28th Winter Universiade was held on 29 January 2017. A total of 1,604 athletes from 56 countries arrived in Almaty to compete in 85 events and 12 types of sports.

OC	Opening ceremony	1	Event finals	CC	Closing ceremony	●	Event competitions	EG	Exhibition gala

January/February	28 Sat	29 Sun	30 Mon	31 Tue	01 Wed	02 Thu	03 Fri	04 Sat	05 Sun	06 Mon	07 Tue	08 Wed	Events
Ceremonies		OC										CC	
Alpine skiing		●	2	●	2		1	1	1	1	1		9
Biathlon			●	2	●	2	2	●	1	●	2		9
Cross-country skiing			2	2		2		1		2	1	1	11
Curling			●	●	●	●	●	●	●	●	2		2
Figure skating					●	1	●	2					3
Freestyle skiing			2	1		2	2			●	2		9
Ice hockey	●	●	●	●	●	●	●	●	●	1	●	1	2
Nordic combined		●	●		1	●	1	●	1				3
Short track speed skating									2	2	4		8
Ski jumping			●	●	2		●	1	2				5
Snowboarding			2	2	●	2			2		2		10
Speed skating				2	2	2	2	2	2	2			14
Total events			8	9	7	11	8	7	11	8	14	2	85
Cumulative total			8	17	24	35	43	50	61	69	83	85	
January/February	28 Sat	29 Sun	30 Mon	31 Tue	01 Wed	02 Thu	03 Fri	04 Sat	05 Sun	06 Mon	07 Tue	08 Wed	Events

=== Cancelled events ===
Bandy was supposed to debut as a demonstration sport. However, after tightening of the budget, Bandy was no longer part of the programme.

On January 17, it was announced the cancellation of pairs competition in the figure skating due to the low number of entrants. Only two pairs from Russia were registered in the event, which forced the cancellation of the same, according to the rules of FISU.

== Participating nations ==
56 national university sports federations sent a total of 1,604 athletes. The International University Sports Federation (FISU) declared there were no positive doping cases at the 28th Winter Universiade.

- Afghanistan (1)
- Andorra (1)
- Argentina (2)
- Armenia (1)
- Australia (7)
- Austria (19)
- Azerbaijan (1)
- Belarus (23)
- Belgium (4)
- Brazil (1)
- Bulgaria (3)
- Canada (88)
- Chile (3)
- China (114)
- Czech Republic (71)
- Estonia (9)
- Finland (17)
- France (38)
- Georgia (8)
- Germany (31)
- Great Britain (63)
- Greece (1)
- Hong Kong (1)
- Hungary (2)
- Iran (3)
- Italy (35)
- Japan (110)
- Kazakhstan (162) (host)
- Kyrgyzstan (9)
- Latvia (26)
- Lebanon (6)
- Lithuania (6)
- Malaysia (1)
- Mexico (2)
- Mongolia (10)
- Morocco (2)
- Netherlands (20)
- New Zealand (1)
- Norway (19)
- Paraguay (1)
- Poland (62)
- Romania (3)
- Russia (210)
- Serbia (6)
- Slovakia (42)
- Slovenia (13)
- South Korea (98)
- Sweden (50)
- Switzerland (35)
- Chinese Taipei (3)
- Tajikistan (4)
- Thailand (1)
- Turkey (20)
- Uganda (1)
- Ukraine (59)
- United States (73)
- Uzbekistan (3)

== Medal table ==
* Host nation (Kazakhstan)

Rank	Nation	Gold	Silver	Bronze	Total
1	Russia (RUS)	29	27	15	71
2	Kazakhstan (KAZ)*	11	8	17	36
3	South Korea (KOR)	11	5	5	21
4	Japan (JPN)	6	12	10	28
5	Poland (POL)	5	2	5	12
6	China (CHN)	4	4	2	10
7	France (FRA)	4	2	2	8
8	Italy (ITA)	4	0	0	4
9	Belarus (BLR)	3	2	1	6
10	Ukraine (UKR)	2	3	4	9
11	Czech Republic (CZE)	2	2	5	9
12	Austria (AUT)	1	2	5	8
13	Canada (CAN)	1	1	1	3
14	Great Britain (GBR)	1	0	0	1
14	Latvia (LAT)	1	0	0	1
16	Netherlands (NED)	0	3	1	4
17	Switzerland (SUI)	0	2	3	5
18	Germany (GER)	0	2	1	3
19	Australia (AUS)	0	2	0	2
19	Finland (FIN)	0	2	0	2
19	Slovenia (SLO)	0	2	0	2
22	Sweden (SWE)	0	1	3	4
23	United States (USA)	0	1	1	2
24	Slovakia (SVK)	0	0	2	2
25	Armenia (ARM)	0	0	1	1
25	Norway (NOR)	0	0	1	1
Totals (26 entries)		85	85	85	255

== Logo of the Winter Universiade 2017 ==
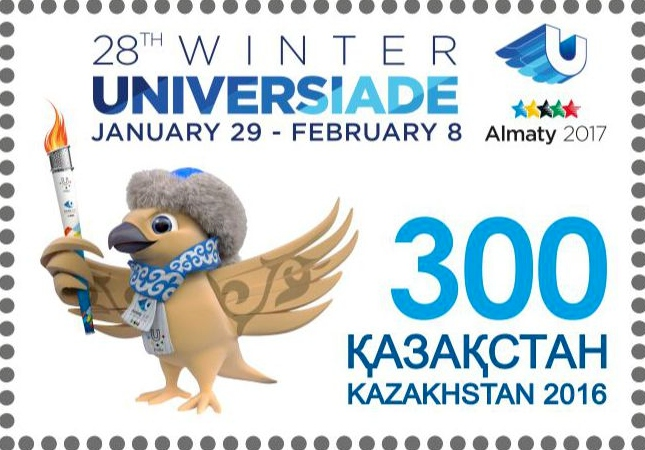
2016 stamp of Kazakhstan showing the mascot of the 2017 Winter Universiade, an eyas.

The logo of the Winter Universiade 2017 was created considering the following images:

- Letter "U" – is an essential attribute of all Universiade logos
- Wings – symbolizes the aspiration to win

The logo was created in bright and soft colors that emphasize the modernity and the eco-friendly approach, which is one of the most important elements of the general concept of the Games.
