= Alexander Loginov (biathlon) =

Russian biathlete (born 1992)

Alexandr Loginov
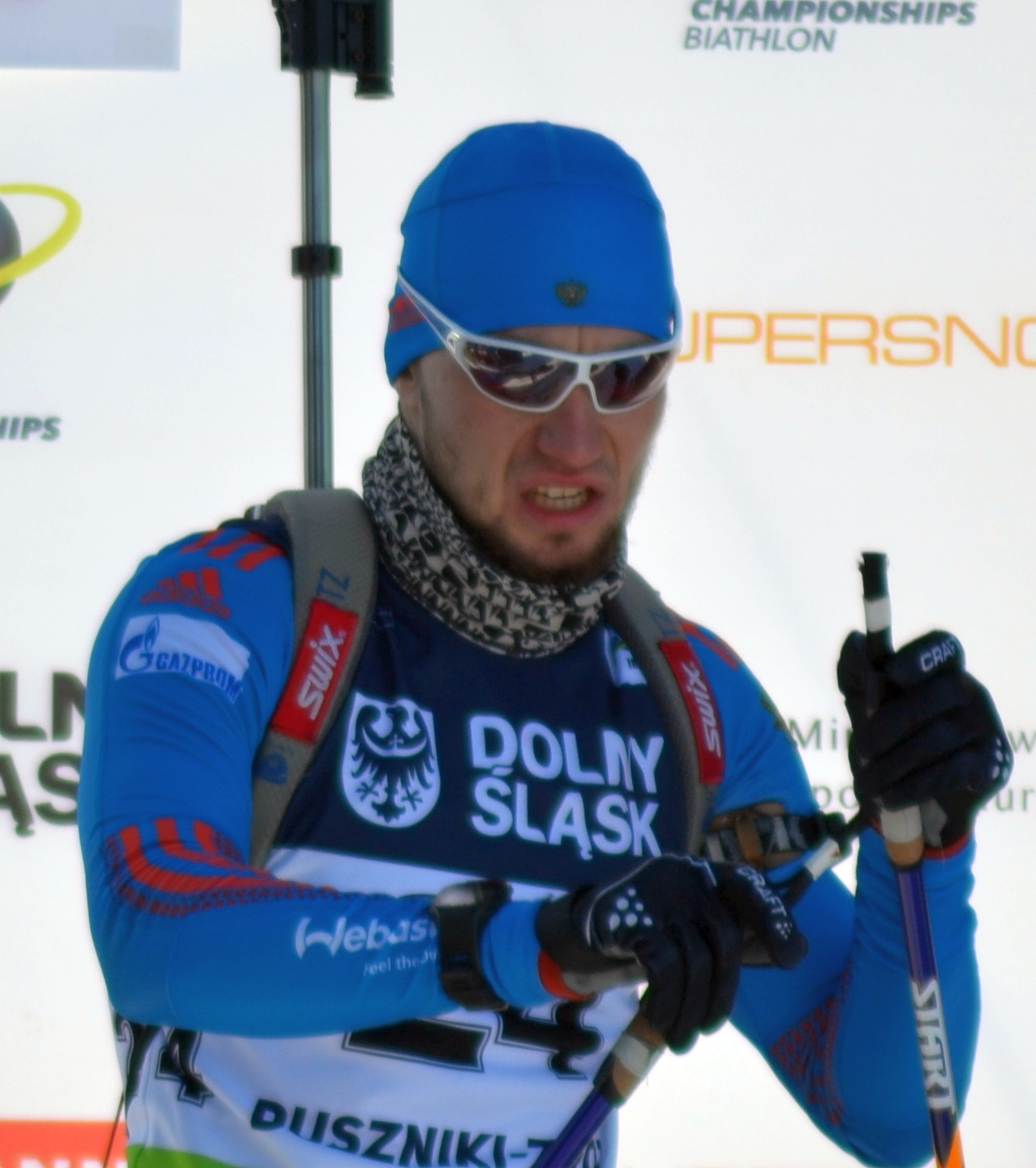
- Loginov in 2017

Personal information
- Full name: Alexandr Viktorovich Loginov
- Nationality: (Russia) Russian
- Born: 31 January 1992 (age 34) Saratov, Russia
- Height: 1.77 m (5 ft 10 in)
- Weight: 71 kg (157 lb)

Sport

Professional information
- Sport: Biathlon
- World Cup debut: 28 February 2013

Olympic Games
- Teams: 2 (2014, 2022)
- Medals: 2

World Championships
- Teams: 4 (2017–2021)
- Medals: 6 (1 gold)

World Cup
- Seasons: 7 (2012/13, 2013/14, 2016/17–)
- Individual victories: 3
- All victories: 6
- Individual podiums: 13
- All podiums: 21
Medal record
Men's biathlon
Representing ROC
Olympic Games
Bronze medal – third place	2022 Beijing	Mixed relay
Bronze medal – third place	2022 Beijing	4 × 7.5 km relay
Representing Russian Biathlon Union
World Championships
Bronze medal – third place	2021 Pokljuka	4 × 7.5 km relay
Representing Russia
World Championships
Gold medal – first place	2020 Antholz	10 km sprint
Silver medal – second place	2019 Östersund	10 km sprint
Bronze medal – third place	2017 Hochfilzen	Mixed relay
Bronze medal – third place	2019 Östersund	4 × 7.5 km relay
Bronze medal – third place	2020 Antholz	12.5 km pursuit
European Championships
Gold medal – first place	2017 Duszniki-Zdrój	20 km individual
Gold medal – first place	2017 Duszniki-Zdrój	12.5 km pursuit
Gold medal – first place	2017 Duszniki-Zdrój	Mixed relay
Gold medal – first place	2018 Ridnaun	12.5 km pursuit
Silver medal – second place	2017 Duszniki-Zdrój	10 km sprint
Silver medal – second place	2018 Ridnaun	10 km sprint
Silver medal – second place	2018 Ridnaun	Mixed relay
World Junior/Youth Championships
Gold medal – first place	2013 Obertilliach	10 km sprint
Gold medal – first place	2013 Obertilliach	15 km individual
Bronze medal – third place	2012 Kontiolahti	15 km individual
Bronze medal – third place	2012 Kontiolahti	12.5 km pursuit
Bronze medal – third place	2013 Obertilliach	12.5 km pursuit
Bronze medal – third place	2013 Obertilliach	4 × 7.5 km relay
Youth World Championships
Gold medal – first place	2010 Torsby	3 × 7.5 km relay
Gold medal – first place	2011 Nové Město	3 × 7.5 km relay
Bronze medal – third place	2011 Nové Město	7.5 km sprint
Bronze medal – third place	2011 Nové Město	10 km pursuit
European U21 Championships
Gold medal – first place	2012 Osrblie	15 km individual
Gold medal – first place	2012 Osrblie	12.5 km pursuit
Gold medal – first place	2013 Bansko	15 km individual
Gold medal – first place	2013 Bansko	10 km sprint
Gold medal – first place	2013 Bansko	12.5 km pursuit
Silver medal – second place	2012 Osrblie	10 km sprint
Silver medal – second place	2012 Osrblie	Mixed relay

Alexandr Viktorovich Loginov (Russian: Александр Викторович Логинов; born 31 January 1992) is a Russian biathlete. He began his career in 2004.

== Career ==
Loginov started his professional career in the late 2012–13 season, taking a bronze medal in pursuit in Holmenkollen and gold as part of the relay team in Sochi.

=== Doping case and suspension ===
Loginov was provisionally suspended by International Biathlon Union (IBU) on 25 November 2014 after re-testing of a sample of his from 26 November 2013 showed he had been doping with EPO. All his results from 26 November 2013 onwards were annulled, and he was handed a two-year ban from sports. The ban ended on 25 November 2016.

=== Return ===
Loginov returned to the sport in the 2016–17 season, winning bronze with the Russian relay team at the Biathlon World Championships 2017. In the next season, Loginov, while failing to finish in the top 3, improved his form, finishing 23rd in the overall standings.

To date, the 2018–19 season was his best one, as Loginov became one of the leading Russian biathletes. He won his first WC cup title in Oberhof, Germany, in a 10 km sprint, after two second-place and two third-place finishes.

In the 2019–20 season, Loginov finished third in the 10 km sprint stage in Hochfilzen and second in the subsequent pursuit stage. After nine stages of no podiums, he recovered at the Biathlon World Championships, which took place in Rasen-Antholz, winning his first World title in the sprint stage and finishing third in the pursuit event. He withdrew from the mass start race after thorough searches by the Carabinieri (Italian police) at the midnight hour, provoked by IBU Anti-Doping Manager Sarah Fussek-Hakkarainen, who had directed an inquiry to the law-enforcement agency of Italy.

== Biathlon results ==
All results are sourced from the International Biathlon Union.

=== Olympic Games ===
2 medals (2 bronze)

Event	Individual	Sprint	Pursuit	Mass start	Relay	Mixed relay
(Russia) 2014 Sochi	DSQ (30th)	—	—	—	—	—
(China) 2022 Beijing	10th	38th	27th	15th	Bronze	Bronze

=== World Championships ===
6 medals (1 gold, 1 silver, 4 bronze)

Event	Individual	Sprint	Pursuit	Mass start	Relay	Mixed relay	Single mixed relay
(Austria) 2017 Hochfilzen	72nd	—	—	—	—	Bronze	—N/a
(Sweden) 2019 Östersund	14th	Silver	14th	4th	Bronze	4th	—
(Italy) 2020 Antholz-Anterselva	15th	Gold	Bronze	WD	4th	6th	—
(Slovenia) 2021 Pokljuka	30th	25th	15th	9th	Bronze	9th	—

*The single mixed relay was added as an event in 2019.

=== Individual victories ===
No.	Season	Date	Location	Discipline	Level
1	2018/19	11 January 2019	(Germany) Oberhof	10 km Sprint	World Cup
2	2019/20	15 February 2020	(Italy) Antholz-Anterselva	10 km Sprint	World Championships
3	2020/21	22 January 2021	(Italy) Antholz-Anterselva	20 km Individual	World Cup
4	2021/22	7 January 2022	(Germany) Oberhof	10 km Sprint	World Cup

*Results are from IBU races which include the Biathlon World Cup, Biathlon World Championships and the Winter Olympic Games.
