= Rok Tršan =

Slovenian biathlete (born 1992)

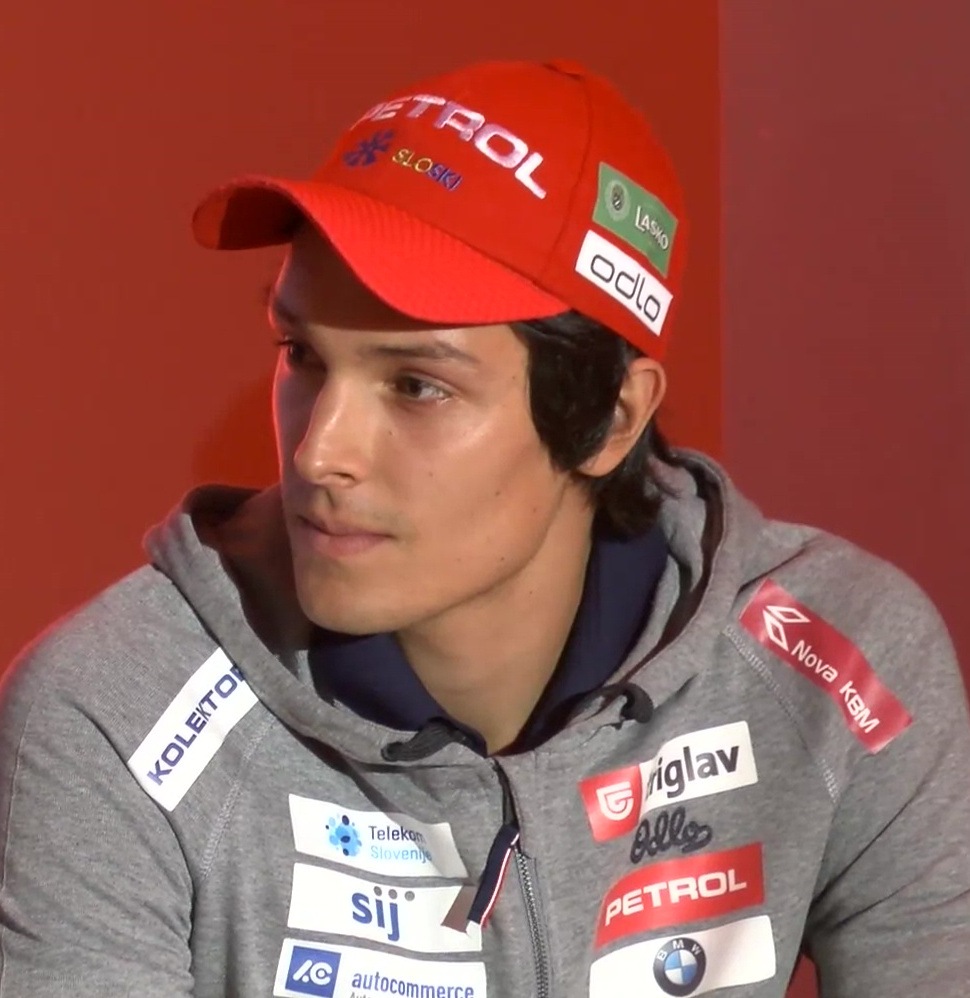
- Tršan in 2016

Personal information
- Born: August 28, 1992 (age 32)

Sport
- Country: Slovenia
- Sport: Biathlon

Rok Tršan (born August 29, 1992, in Logatec, Slovenia) is a Slovenian biathlete.

Tršan began to compete in biathlon in 2014.

== Biathlon results ==
All results are sourced from the International Biathlon Union.

=== Olympic Games ===
0 medals

Event	Individual	Sprint	Pursuit	Mass start	Relay	Mixed relay
(China) 2022 Beijing	54th	86th	—	—	11th	—

=== World Championships ===
0 medals

Event	Individual	Sprint	Pursuit	Mass start	Relay	Mixed relay	Single Mixed relay
(Finland) 2015 Kontiolahti	—	71st	—	—	8th	—	—
(Norway) 2016 Oslo	33rd	85th	—	—	17th	—	—
(Austria) 2017 Hochfilzen	—	93rd	—	—	18th	—	—
(Sweden) 2019 Östersund	55th	—	—	—	5th	—	—
(Italy) 2020 Antholz	52nd	29th	25th	—	5th	23rd	—
(Slovenia) 2021 Pokljuka	41st	50th	46th	—	8th	—	—
(Germany) 2023 Oberhof	—	—	—	—	—	12th	—

*During Olympic seasons competitions are only held for those events not included in the Olympic program.
**The single mixed relay was added as an event in 2019.
