= Biathlon at the 2018 Winter Olympics – Qualification =

The following is about the qualification rules and the quota allocation for the biathlon at the 2018 Winter Olympics.

== Quota allocation ==
A total quota of 230 athletes are allowed at the Games (115 both men and women). The first 218 quota allocations will be assigned using a combination of the Nation Cup scores of their top 3 athletes in the individual, sprint, and relay competitions, during the 2016–17 Biathlon World Cup season. The final 12 spots will be allocated during the 2017–18 Biathlon World Cup season to nations who have not qualified any athletes yet, with a maximum of two per nation.

An athlete also must meet requirements before competing: During the 2016/17 or 2017/18 Biathlon World Cup season the athlete must have two results at IBU Cup, Open European Championships, World Championships or World Cup in the Sprint or Individual that at a maximum is 20% behind the average time of the top three athletes. Or, two placings in the top half at the Junior World Championships. They also can have a combination of both criteria (one of each). All relay members must meet this requirement as well.

Nations ranked 1-5 in the 2016–17 season will qualify six athletes, 6-20 five athletes, and 21-22 two athletes, for both male and female competitions. The final six spots in each gender are filled individually in the 2017–18 season from the IBU Qualifying points list to a maximum of two for a nation, from nations not already qualified. One of these spots will be used by the host if not already qualified. Additionally, the host will be allowed to enter enough additional athletes to compete in each of the relay races. There will be no reallocation of unused spots.

== Qualification summary ==
Nations	Men's	Women's	Total
Austria	6	~~5~~ 3	9
Belgium	2	0	2
Belarus	5	5	10
Bulgaria	5	5	10
Canada	5	5	10
China	0	2	2
Czech Republic	5	6	11
Estonia	5	1	6
Finland	~~5~~ 3	5	8
France	6	6	12
Germany	6	6	12
Great Britain	0	1	1
Italy	5	6	11
Japan	1	5	6
Kazakhstan	5	5	10
Latvia	2	1	3
Lithuania	2	2	4
Norway	6	5	11
Poland	2	5	7
Romania	5	1	6
Olympic Athletes from Russia	~~6~~ 2	~~5~~ 2	4
Slovakia	5	5	10
Slovenia	5	2	7
South Korea	1	5	6
Sweden	5	5	10
Switzerland	5	5	10
Ukraine	5	6	11
United States	5	5	10
Total: 28 NOCs	109	110	219

== Qualification standings ==
Qualifies 6 athletes
Qualifies 5 athletes
Qualifies 2 athletes
Qualifies 2 athletes by IBU qualifying points
Qualifies 1 athlete by IBU qualifying points

Final standings after 22 events

Men's standings
Position	Country	2016–2017 Nations Cup Points
1	Germany	7448
2	France	7416
3	Olympic Athletes from Russia	7192
4	Norway	7181
5	Austria	6926
6	Ukraine	6270
7	Czech Republic	6223
8	Italy	5556
9	Switzerland	5395
10	United States	5290
11	Bulgaria	5098
12	Sweden	4885
13	Canada	4625
14	Belarus	4483
15	Kazakhstan	4322
16	Slovakia	4203
17	Slovenia	4069
18	Romania	3408
19	Estonia	3393
20	Finland	3202
21	Latvia	3152
22	Lithuania	2988
23	Poland	2739
24	Japan	2586
25	South Korea	1715
26	Belgium	1242
27	Great Britain	492
28	Croatia	467
29	Serbia	162
30	Greece	161
31	Hungary	70
32	Australia	47

Final standings after 22 events

Women's standings
Position	Country	2016–2017 Nations Cup Points
1	Germany	7951
2	France	7646
3	Ukraine	6605
4	Czech Republic	6547
5	Italy	6481
6	Norway	6265
7	Olympic Athletes from Russia	6139
8	Sweden	6034
9	Belarus	5683
10	Kazakhstan	5193
11	Switzerland	5101
12	Poland	5035
13	Austria	4954
14	United States	4743
15	Canada	4619
15	Finland	4619
17	Slovakia	4498
18	Japan	3608
19	Bulgaria	3142
20	South Korea	3051
21	Slovenia	2969
22	Lithuania	2737
23	Estonia	2692
24	Romania	2086
25	China	1584
26	Latvia	1228
27	Great Britain	642
28	Spain	459
29	Hungary	339
30	Bosnia and Herzegovina	144
31	Moldova	104
32	Greece	64

- Note that there is a limit of four athletes per nation able to enter each specific event regardless of quota.
