= Biathlon World Championships 2017 – Men's relay =

Men's relay at the Biathlon World Championships 2017
- Location: Hochfilzen, Austria
- Dates: 18 February
- Competitors: 104 from 26 nations
- Teams: 26
- Winning time: 1:14:15.0

Medalists
gold medal	Alexey Volkov; Maxim Tsvetkov; Anton Babikov; Anton Shipulin	Russia
silver medal	Jean-Guillaume Béatrix; Quentin Fillon Maillet; Simon Desthieux; Martin Fourcade	France
bronze medal	Daniel Mesotitsch; Julian Eberhard; Simon Eder; Dominik Landertinger	Austria

The Men's relay competition at the 2017 World Championships was held on 18 February 2017.

== Results ==
The race was started at 14:45.

Rank	Bib	Team	Time	Penalties (P+S)	Deficit
1st place, gold medalist(s)	2	Russia; Alexey Volkov; Maxim Tsvetkov; Anton Babikov; Anton Shipulin	1:14:15.0; 18:49.2; 18:35.0; 18:57.7; 17:53.1	0+1 0+2; 0+1 0+1; 0+0 0+0; 0+0 0+0; 0+0 0+1	
2nd place, silver medalist(s)	5	France; Jean-Guillaume Béatrix; Quentin Fillon Maillet; Simon Desthieux; Martin Fourcade	1:14:20.8; 18:34.6; 18:40.9; 19:18.9; 17:46.4	0+4 0+0; 0+0 0+0; 0+1 0+0; 0+3 0+0; 0+0 0+0	+5.8
3rd place, bronze medalist(s)	6	Austria; Daniel Mesotitsch; Julian Eberhard; Simon Eder; Dominik Landertinger	1:14:35.1; 18:50.3; 18:39.3; 18:52.8; 18:12.7	0+4 0+6; 0+0 0+1; 0+2 0+2; 0+1 0+2; 0+1 0+1	+20.1
4	1	Germany; Erik Lesser; Benedikt Doll; Arnd Peiffer; Simon Schempp	1:14:44.6; 18:29.2; 19:19.1; 18:47.4; 18:08.9	0+4 0+4; 0+0 0+0; 0+1 0+3; 0+2 0+1; 0+1 0+0	+29.6
5	8	Italy; Lukas Hofer; Dominik Windisch; Giuseppe Montello; Thomas Bormolini	1:15:45.8; 18:48.8; 18:27.1; 19:37.6; 18:52.3	0+3 0+2; 0+1 0+1; 0+0 0+0; 0+0 0+1; 0+2 0+0	+1:30.8
6	4	Ukraine; Artem Pryma; Serhiy Semenov; Vladimir Semakov; Dmytro Pidruchnyi	1:15:56.3; 18:43.1; 18:40.3; 19:29.6; 19:03.3	0+6 0+4; 0+1 0+0; 0+0 0+1; 0+2 0+1; 0+3 0+3	+1:41.3
7	18	United States; Lowell Bailey; Leif Nordgren; Tim Burke; Sean Doherty	1:16:05.5; 18:41.6; 18:51.6; 19.49.9; 18:42.4	0+4 0+4; 0+1 0+0; 0+0 0+1; 0+1 0+3; 0+2 0+0	+1:50.5
8	3	Norway; Ole Einar Bjørndalen; Emil Hegle Svendsen; Tarjei Bø; Johannes Thingnes Bø	1:16:37.3; 18:59.9; 19:00.1; 19.44.6; 18:52.7	0+3 1+5; 0+0 0+2; 0+1 0+0; 0+0 1+3; 0+2 0+0	+2:22.3
9	9	Bulgaria; Krasimir Anev; Anton Sinapov; Michail Kletcherov; Vladimir Iliev	1:17:05.3; 18:41.4; 19:57.8; 19.24.8; 19:01.3	0+3 1+4; 0+1 0+0; 0+0 1+3; 0+0 0+1; 0+2 0+0	+2:50.3
10	7	Czech Republic; Tomáš Krupčík; Ondřej Moravec; Michal Šlesingr; Michal Krčmář	1:17:25.0; 19:59.8; 19:06.3; 19.16.4; 19:02.5	0+7 1+8; 0+1 1+3; 0+1 0+1; 0+3 0+2; 0+2 0+2	+3:10.0
11	16	Sweden; Torstein Stenersen; Jesper Nelin; Sebastian Samuelsson; Fredrik Lindström	1:17:25.1; 18:50.9; 19:28.5; 20.50.1; 18:15.6	0+4 1+7; 0+0 0+1; 0+2 0+3; 0+2 1+3; 0+0 0+0	+3:10.1
12	14	Slovakia; Matej Kazár; Martin Otčenáš; Tomáš Hasilla; Michal Šíma	1:17:44.0; 19:09.0; 19:24.0; 19.53.9; 19:17.1	0+6 0+3; 0+1 0+0; 0+2 0+1; 0+3 0+2; 0+0 0+0	+3:29.0
13	11	Canada; Christian Gow; Scott Gow; Macx Davies; Brendan Green	1:17:50.5; 19:08.5; 19:38.6; 19.58.1; 19:05.3	0+6 0+4; 0+2 0+1; 0+2 0+1; 0+2 0+1; 0+0 0+0	+3:35.5
14	12	Kazakhstan; Yan Savitskiy; Vassiliy Podkorytov; Maxim Braun; Anton Pantov	1:18:01.4; 19:10.4; 20:05.1; 19.30.3; 19:15.6	1+7 0+5; 0+1 0+2; 1+3 0+1; 0+1 0+2; 0+2 0+0	+3:46.4
15	22	Japan; Mikito Tachizaki; Tsukasa Kobonoki; Junji Nagai; Kosuke Ozaki	1:18:08.1; 19:08.0; 19:43.3; 19.55.2; 19:21.6	0+5 0+7; 0+0 0+3; 0+2 0+1; 0+0 0+3; 0+3 0+0	+3:53.1
16	10	Switzerland; Jeremy Finello; Benjamin Weger; Mario Dolder; Serafin Wiestner	1:18:47.5; 19:59.4; 18:47.0; 20.55.4; 19:05.7	0+5 2+7; 0+3 0+2; 0+0 0+0; 0+1 2+3; 0+1 0+2	+4:32.5
17	21	Romania; George Buta; Gheorghe Pop; Cornel Puchianu; Remus Faur	1:19:28.3; 19:56.1; 20:28.1; 19.27.6; 19:36.5	0+6 0+6; 0+2 0+1; 0+0 0+2; 0+1 0+2; 0+3 0+1	+5:13.3
18	13	Slovenia; Miha Dovžan; Klemen Bauer; Rok Tršan; Lenart Oblak	1:19:35.0; 19:33.0; 18:55.4; 20.43.9; 20:22.7	0+7 0+7; 0+1 0+1; 0+0 0+2; 0+3 0+2; 0+3 0+2	+5:20.0
19	17	Belarus; Vladimir Chepelin; Maksim Varabei; Dzmitry Abasheu; Sergey Bocharnikov	1:19:55.1; 19:30.5; 21:32.0; 19.40.4; 19:12.2	0+5 4+7; 0+1 1+3; 0+2 3+3; 0+0 0+0; 0+3 0+1	+5:40.1
20	19	Finland; Mikko Loukkaanhuhta; Tuomas Grönman; Olli Hiidensalo; Tero Seppälä	1:20:08.2; 20:01.6; 21:02.7; 19.31.9; 19:32.0	1+4 0+4; 0+1 0+1; 1+3 0+1; 0+0 0+0; 0+0 0+2	+5:53.2
21	15	Estonia; Rene Zahkna; Kauri Kõiv; Roland Lessing; Kalev Ermits	1:20:39.8; 19:41.7; 20:15.5; 20.09.7; 20:32.9	0+3 2+9; 0+0 0+2; 0+1 0+2; 0+2 0+2; 0+0 2+3	+6:24.8
22	24	Latvia; Andrejs Rastorgujevs; Daumants Lūsa; Aleksandrs Patrijuks; Ilmārs Bricis	1:21:07.2; 19:35.4; 20:12.7; 20.17.9; 21:01.2	0+1 1+6; 0+0 1+3; 0+0 0+1; 0+1 0+2; 0+0 0+0	+6:52.2
23	25	South Korea; Kim Jong-min; Lee In-bok; Kim Yong-gyu; Heo Seon-hoe	LAP; 20:40.2; 20:05.4; 20.32.8	0+2 0+3; 0+0 0+1; 0+0 0+0; 0+1 0+2; 0+1	
24	20	Poland; Łukasz Szczurek; Grzegorz Guzik; Andrzej Nędza-Kubiniec; Rafał Penar	LAP; 20:12.8; 20:46.7; 20.37.6	1+6 0+2; 0+2 0+1; 1+3 0+0; 0+0 0+1; 0+1	
25	23	Lithuania; Tomas Kaukėnas; Karol Dombrovski; Vytautas Strolia; Rokas Suslavičius	LAP; 20:10.4; 21:14.7; 20.28.3	0+4 2+7; 0+0 1+3; 0+2 1+3; 0+2 0+1; 0+0	
26	26	Great Britain; Scott Dixon; Marcel Laponder; Vinny Fountain; Alex Gleave	LAP; 20:09.3; 21:59.4	3+4 0+4; 0+0 0+1; 0+1 0+3; 3+3	
