= Cross-country skiing at the 2018 Winter Olympics – Qualification =

The following is about the qualification rules and the quota allocation for the cross-country skiing at the 2018 Winter Olympics.

== Qualification rules ==
=== Quotas ===
A total of 310 athletes are allowed to compete at the Games. A maximum of 20 athletes per nation will be allowed to compete with a maximum of 12 males or 12 females from a nation being permitted.

=== A standard ===
An athlete with a maximum of 100 FIS distance points will be allowed to compete in both or one of the event (sprint/distance). An athlete with a maximum 120 FIS sprint points will be allowed to compete in the sprint event and 10 km for women or 15 km for men provided their distance points does not exceed 300 FIS points.

=== B standard ===
NOC's who do not have any athlete meeting the A standard can enter one competitor of each sex (known as the basic quota) in the sprint event or 10 km freestyle event for women/15 km freestyle event for men. They must have a maximum of 300 FIS distance points at the end of qualifying on January 22, 2018. The qualification period began in July 2016.

=== Allocation of quotas ===
Basic Quota

Every NOC will be assigned one male and one female quota spot by meeting the B standard.

Top 300 on Points list

Every NOC with at least one male and/or female in the top 300 of any event will be allocated one additional male and/or female quota in addition to the basic quota.

Top 30 on Points list

Every NOC with at least one male and/or female in the top 30 of any event will be allocated additional male and/or female quotas up to a maximum of 4.

Remaining quotas

The remaining quotas will be assigned using the Olympic Quota allocation list on 22 January 2018. The spots will be assigned until a maximum of 310 quotas are reached including the above. When a nation reaches its maximum, remaining athletes from that country will be skipped over. The list is a table of athletes in the top 500 in both events (distance and sprint).

An athlete can be counted only once for the above three criteria. For example, if a country has only one athlete meeting all three criteria then only one quota will be given (not 3).

== Quota allocation ==
Current quotas as of 26 January 2018 (after reallocation).

=== Summary ===
Nations	Men	Women	Additional	Athletes
Andorra	1			1
Argentina	1	1		2
Armenia	1	1		2
Australia	2	2	2	6
Austria	2	2	3	7
Belarus	2	2	5	9
Belgium	1			1
Bermuda	1			1
Bolivia	1			1
Bosnia and Herzegovina	1	1		2
Brazil	1	1		2
Bulgaria	2	1		3
Canada	2	2	7	11
Chile	1	1		2
China	2	2		4
Colombia	1			1
Croatia	2	2		4
Czech Republic	2	2	6	10
Denmark	1			1
Ecuador	1			1
Estonia	2	2	3	7
Finland	2	2	15	19
France	2	2	9	13
Germany	2	2	12	16
Great Britain	1	1	2	4
Greece	1	1		2
Hungary	1	1		2
Iceland	2	1		3
India	1			1
Iran	1	1		2
Ireland	1			1
Italy	2	2	11	15
Japan	1	1		2
Kazakhstan	2	2	3	7
Kyrgyzstan	1			1
Latvia	1	2		3
Lebanon	1			1
Liechtenstein	1			1
Lithuania	2	1		3
Macedonia	1	1		2
Mexico	1			1
Moldova	1			1
Mongolia	1	1		2
Montenegro		1		1
Morocco	1			1
North Korea^{1}	2	1		3
Norway	2	2	16	20
Pakistan	1			1
Poland	2	2	3	7
Portugal	1			1
Romania	2	1		3
Olympic Athletes from Russia	2	2	8	12
Serbia	1			1
Slovakia	2	2	1	5
Slovenia	2	2	4	8
South Korea	2	2		4
Spain	2			2
Sweden	2	2	16	20
Switzerland	2	2	9	13
Thailand	1	1		2
Togo		1		1
Tonga	1			1
Turkey	2	1		3
Ukraine	2	2		4
United States	2	2	16	20
Total: 65 NOCs	93	69	151	313

1. The IOC decided to allow two male and one female competitor from North Korea, which were allocated as three additional places to the existing quotas.

=== Men ===
Criteria	Athletes per NOC	Total Athletes	Qualified
Top 300, Basic quota	2	58	Australia; Austria; Belarus; Bulgaria; Canada; China; Croatia; Czech Republic; Estonia; Finland; France; Germany; Iceland; Italy; ~~Japan~~; Kazakhstan; Lithuania; Norway; Poland; Romania; Olympic Athletes from Russia; ~~Serbia~~; Slovakia; Slovenia; South Korea; Spain; Sweden; Switzerland; Turkey; Ukraine; United States
Basic quota	1	33	Andorra; Argentina; Armenia; Belgium; Bermuda; Bolivia; Bosnia and Herzegovina; Brazil; Chile; Colombia; Denmark; ~~Dominica~~; Ecuador; Great Britain; Greece; Hungary; India; Iran; Ireland; Japan; Kyrgyzstan; Latvia; Lebanon; Liechtenstein; ~~Luxembourg~~; Macedonia; Mexico; Moldova; Mongolia; Montenegro; Pakistan; Portugal; Serbia; Thailand; Tonga
IOC special considerations	2	2	North Korea
Total		93	

=== Women ===
Criteria	Athletes per NOC	Total Athletes	Qualified
Top 300, Basic quota	2	48	Australia; Austria; Belarus; Canada; China; Croatia; Czech Republic; Estonia; Finland; France; Germany; ~~Great Britain~~; Italy; ~~Japan~~; Kazakhstan; Latvia; Norway; Poland; Olympic Athletes from Russia; Slovakia; Slovenia; South Korea; Sweden; Switzerland; Ukraine; United States
Basic quota	1	22	~~Andorra~~; Argentina; Armenia; Bosnia and Herzegovina; Brazil; Bulgaria; Chile; Great Britain; Greece; Hungary; Iceland; Iran; Japan; ~~Liechtenstein~~; Lithuania; Macedonia; Montenegro; Mongolia; Romania; ~~Serbia~~; ~~Spain~~; Thailand; Togo; Turkey
IOC special considerations	1	1	North Korea
Total		70	

=== Remaining quotas ===
Athletes per NOC	Total	Qualified
16	48	Norway; Sweden; United States
15	15	Finland
12	12	Germany
11	11	Italy
9	18	France; Switzerland
8	8	Olympic Athletes from Russia
7	7	Canada
6	6	Czech Republic
5	5	Belarus
4	4	Slovenia
3	12	Austria; Estonia; Kazakhstan; Poland
2	4	Australia; Great Britain
1	1	~~Japan~~; Slovakia
TOTAL	151	

- Germany rejected three quotas, Austria and Japan one. Reallocated totals have been added in with modified totals reflected in the list.

=== Next eligible NOC ===
Fifteen quota spots were made available for reallocation. After reallocation, team OAR reduced their team by an additional eight athletes. Bold indicates the acceptance of a quota, while a strike through indicates refusal.

Next available NOC

**Estonia**
**France**
**Czech Republic**
**Slovenia**
**Canada**
**Belarus**
**United States**
**Estonia**
~~France~~
**Australia**
**Czech Republic**
**Switzerland**
**United States**
**Switzerland**
**Australia**
~~Switzerland~~
~~Finland~~
~~Italy~~
**Kazakhstan**
**Canada**
**Czech Republic**
**Czech Republic**
**Slovakia**
~~Czech Republic~~
**Estonia**
**Canada**
**Belarus**
**Poland**
Ukraine
Estonia
China
Canada
Kazakhstan
