= Biathlon at the 2018 Winter Olympics – Men's sprint =

Men's sprint at the XXIII Olympic Winter Games
- Venue: Alpensia Biathlon Centre in Pyeongchang, South Korea
- Date: 11 February 2018
- Competitors: 87 from 26 nations
- Winning time: 23:38.8

Medalists
1st place, gold medalist(s)		Arnd Peiffer	Germany
2nd place, silver medalist(s)		Michal Krčmář	Czech Republic
3rd place, bronze medalist(s)		Dominik Windisch	Italy

The men's 10 km sprint biathlon competition of the Pyeongchang 2018 Olympics was held on 11 February 2018 at the Alpensia Biathlon Centre in Pyeongchang, South Korea. The event was won by Arnd Peiffer, with Michal Krčmář taking silver and Dominik Windisch bronze. This was the first individual Olympic medal for both Peiffer and Windisch, whereas for Krčmář, this was the first Olympic medal.

== Summary ==
The 2014 champion, Ole Einar Bjørndalen, did not qualify for the event, and only the silver medalist, Dominik Landertinger, was competing. The field also included the 2010 silver, Emil Hegle Svendsen, and bronze, Jakov Fak, medalists. None of them were in medal contention during the event.

The early leader was Julian Eberhard, whose result was first improved by Peiffer. Krčmář finished second, and subsequently Windisch third, moving Eberhard down to fourth. Only four of the 87 competitors did not miss any targets, including the top two, Peiffer and Krčmář.

In the victory ceremony the day after, the medals were presented by Irena Szewińska, member of the International Olympic Committee, accompanied by James Carrabre, IBU Vice President of Medical Issues.

== Schedule ==
All times are (UTC+9).

Date	Time	Round
11 February	20:15	Final

== Results ==
The race was started at 20:15.

Rank	Bib	Name	Country	Time	Penalties (P+S)	Deficit
1st place, gold medalist(s)	22	Arnd Peiffer	Germany	23:38.8	0 (0+0)	—
2nd place, silver medalist(s)	36	Michal Krčmář	Czech Republic	23:43.2	0 (0+0)	+4.4
3rd place, bronze medalist(s)	42	Dominik Windisch	Italy	23:46.5	1 (0+1)	+7.7
4	5	Julian Eberhard	Austria	23:47.2	1 (0+1)	+8.4
5	30	Erlend Bjøntegaard	Norway	23:56.2	2 (0+2)	+17.4
6	6	Benedikt Doll	Germany	23:56.4	1 (0+1)	+17.6
7	24	Simon Schempp	Germany	24:00.2	1 (0+1)	+21.4
8	54	Martin Fourcade	France	24:00.9	3 (3+0)	+22.1
9	71	Serafin Wiestner	Switzerland	24:02.3	1 (0+1)	+23.5
10	18	Lukas Hofer	Italy	24:09.8	2 (1+1)	+31.0
11	32	Erik Lesser	Germany	24:10.7	1 (0+1)	+31.9
12	41	Simon Desthieux	France	24:11.1	2 (2+0)	+32.3
13	16	Tarjei Bø	Norway	24:12.5	2 (2+0)	+33.7
14	40	Sebastian Samuelsson	Sweden	24:12.6	2 (2+0)	+33.8
15	26	Benjamin Weger	Switzerland	24:15.5	1 (0+1)	+36.7
16	1	Timofey Lapshin	South Korea	24:22.6	1 (0+1)	+43.8
17	31	Tomas Kaukėnas	Lithuania	24:23.5	1 (0+1)	+44.7
18	10	Emil Hegle Svendsen	Norway	24:23.8	2 (1+1)	+45.0
19	66	Olli Hiidensalo	Finland	24:26.3	0 (0+0)	+47.5
20	45	Tero Seppälä	Finland	24:27.3	1 (1+0)	+48.5
21	11	Dmytro Pidruchnyi	Ukraine	24:27.5	0 (0+0)	+48.7
22	57	Matej Kazár	Slovakia	24:33.7	1 (0+1)	+54.9
23	13	Jakov Fak	Slovenia	24:34.2	2 (1+1)	+55.4
24	46	Andrejs Rastorgujevs	Latvia	24:34.4	3 (1+2)	+55.6
25	50	Dominik Landertinger	Austria	24:36.2	1 (1+0)	+57.4
26	9	Klemen Bauer	Slovenia	24:36.4	2 (0+2)	+57.6
27	27	Antonin Guigonnat	France	24:37.5	3 (1+2)	+58.7
28	28	Simon Eder	Austria	24:42.5	2 (2+0)	+1:03.7
29	12	Ondřej Moravec	Czech Republic	24:46.7	1 (1+0)	+1:07.9
30	72	Jesper Nelin	Sweden	24:46.8	3 (1+2)	+1:08.0
31	20	Johannes Thingnes Bø	Norway	24:51.5	4 (3+1)	+1:12.7
32	87	Peppe Femling	Sweden	24:52.2	2 (1+1)	+1:13.4
33	64	Lowell Bailey	United States	24:54.4	1 (0+1)	+1:15.6
34	23	Vladimir Chepelin	Belarus	25:04.8	2 (1+1)	+1:26.0
35	80	Anton Smolski	Belarus	25:05.9	1 (1+0)	+1:27.1
36	15	Kalev Ermits	Estonia	25:07.2	2 (2+0)	+1:28.4
37	2	Krasimir Anev	Bulgaria	25:08.8	2 (1+1)	+1:30.0
38	39	Michael Rösch	Belgium	25:09.4	2 (0+2)	+1:30.6
39	25	Fredrik Lindström	Sweden	25:14.1	3 (2+1)	+1:35.3
40	35	Artem Pryma	Ukraine	25:14.9	2 (1+1)	+1:36.1
41	49	Roland Lessing	Estonia	25:19.7	2 (1+1)	+1:40.9
42	60	Sergey Bocharnikov	Belarus	25:20.9	2 (1+1)	+1:42.1
43	43	Roman Yeremin	Kazakhstan	25:21.9	2 (1+1)	+1:43.1
44	69	Nathan Smith	Canada	25:22.3	1 (1+0)	+1:43.5
45	3	Tuomas Grönman	Finland	25:24.3	1 (0+1)	+1:45.5
46	65	Serhiy Semenov	Ukraine	25:24.9	1 (0+1)	+1:46.1
47	34	Tim Burke	United States	25:26.3	4 (2+2)	+1:47.5
48	37	Quentin Fillon Maillet	France	25:28.1	4 (3+1)	+1:49.3
49	61	Vytautas Strolia	Lithuania	25:32.4	2 (1+1)	+1:53.6
50	70	Giuseppe Montello	Italy	25:35.3	2 (0+2)	+1:56.5
51	14	Thomas Bormolini	Italy	25:39.3	2 (1+1)	+2:00.5
52	19	Martin Otčenáš	Slovakia	25:39.7	4 (0+4)	+2:00.9
53	33	Miha Dovžan	Slovenia	25:42.2	2 (2+0)	+2:03.4
54	56	Vladimir Iliev	Bulgaria	25:42.7	4 (0+4)	+2:03.9
55	29	Florent Claude	Belgium	25:43.7	3 (1+2)	+2:04.9
56	68	Anton Sinapov	Bulgaria	25:47.9	3 (2+1)	+2:09.1
57	21	Anton Babikov	Olympic Athletes from Russia	25:48.5	4 (3+1)	+2:09.7
58	85	Leif Nordgren	United States	25:49.0	2 (1+1)	+2:10.2
59	4	Grzegorz Guzik	Poland	25:52.2	2 (0+2)	+2:13.4
60	55	Cornel Puchianu	Romania	25:52.7	1 (1+0)	+2:13.9
61	48	Scott Gow	Canada	25:52.8	4 (4+0)	+2:14.0
62	7	Christian Gow	Canada	25:53.5	3 (2+1)	+2:14.7
63	47	Jeremy Finello	Switzerland	25:54.7	3 (2+1)	+2:15.9
64	8	Mario Dolder	Switzerland	25:54.8	5 (3+2)	+2:16.0
65	17	Sean Doherty	United States	25:55.2	4 (4+0)	+2:16.4
66	63	Oskars Muižnieks	Latvia	25:56.3	2 (1+1)	+2:17.5
67	51	Andrzej Nędza-Kubiniec	Poland	25:59.2	2 (2+0)	+2:20.4
68	58	Remus Faur	Romania	26:03.3	1 (0+1)	+2:24.5
69	59	Michal Šlesingr	Czech Republic	26:06.0	4 (0+4)	+2:27.2
70	76	Tomáš Hasilla	Slovakia	26:10.4	3 (1+2)	+2:31.6
71	52	Raman Yaliotnau	Belarus	26:12.6	6 (2+4)	+2:33.8
72	62	Mitja Drinovec	Slovenia	26:13.7	3 (1+2)	+2:34.9
73	86	Adam Václavík	Czech Republic	26:15.4	4 (2+2)	+2:36.6
74	81	Šimon Bartko	Slovakia	26:18.4	5 (2+3)	+2:39.6
75	74	Rene Zahkna	Estonia	26:19.9	3 (1+2)	+2:41.1
76	84	Kauri Kõiv	Estonia	26:23.3	3 (2+1)	+2:44.5
77	67	Tobias Eberhard	Austria	26:24.3	5 (4+1)	+2:45.5
78	78	Volodymyr Siemakov	Ukraine	26:31.7	3 (1+2)	+2:52.9
79	73	Vladislav Vitenko	Kazakhstan	26:32.7	4 (2+2)	+2:53.9
80	77	Vassiliy Podkorytov	Kazakhstan	26:34.7	1 (1+0)	+2:55.9
81	82	Dimitar Gerdzhikov	Bulgaria	26:47.9	4 (2+2)	+3:09.1
82	83	Brendan Green	Canada	26:48.0	3 (0+3)	+3:09.2
83	44	Matvey Eliseev	Olympic Athletes from Russia	26:59.3	5 (3+2)	+3:20.5
84	53	Mikito Tachizaki	Japan	27:27.1	3 (0+3)	+3:48.3
85	38	Maxim Braun	Kazakhstan	27:46.7	4 (3+1)	+4:07.9
86	75	Gheorghe Pop	Romania	28:04.4	5 (2+3)	+4:25.6
87	79	Marius Ungureanu	Romania	28:59.1	4 (2+2)	+5:20.3
