= Biathlon at the 2018 Winter Olympics – Men's relay =

Men's relay at the XXIII Olympic Winter Games
- Venue: Alpensia Biathlon Centre in Pyeongchang, South Korea
- Date: 23 February 2018
- Competitors: 73 from 19 nations
- Winning time: 1:15:16.5

Medalists
1st place, gold medalist(s)		Peppe Femling; Jesper Nelin; Sebastian Samuelsson; Fredrik Lindström	Sweden
2nd place, silver medalist(s)		Lars Helge Birkeland; Tarjei Bø; Johannes Thingnes Bø; Emil Hegle Svendsen	Norway
3rd place, bronze medalist(s)		Erik Lesser; Benedikt Doll; Arnd Peiffer; Simon Schempp	Germany

The men's 4 × 7.5 km relay biathlon competition of the Pyeongchang 2018 Olympics was held on 23 February 2018 at the Alpensia Biathlon Centre in Pyeongchang, South Korea.

== Schedule ==
All times are (UTC+9).

Date	Time	Round
23 February	20:15	Final

== Results ==
The race started at 20:15.

Rank	Bib	Country	Time	Penalties (P+S)	Deficit
1st place, gold medalist(s)	3	Sweden Peppe Femling; Jesper Nelin; Sebastian Samuelsson; Fredrik Lindström	1:15:16.5; 18:50.9; 18:59.9; 18:31.5; 18:54.2	0+2 0+5; 0+0 0+1; 0+1 0+3; 0+1 0+0; 0+0 0+1	—
2nd place, silver medalist(s)	1	Norway Lars Helge Birkeland; Tarjei Bø; Johannes Thingnes Bø; Emil Hegle Svendsen	1:16:12.0; 18:48.1; 19:17.5; 18:16.3; 19:50.1	0+4 1+8; 0+1 0+1; 0+3 0+3; 0+0 0+1; 0+0 1+3	+55.5
3rd place, bronze medalist(s)	4	Germany Erik Lesser; Benedikt Doll; Arnd Peiffer; Simon Schempp	1:17:23.6; 18:23.6; 19:48.2; 18:23.8; 20:48.0	0+3 3+7; 0+0 0+1; 0+0 2+3; 0+0 0+0; 0+3 1+3	+2:07.1
4	8	Austria Tobias Eberhard; Simon Eder; Julian Eberhard; Dominik Landertinger	1:18:09.0; 19:03.6; 18:47.4; 19:53.9; 20:24.1	0+2 2+9; 0+1 0+2; 0+0 0+1; 0+1 2+3; 0+0 0+3	+2:52.5
5	2	France Simon Desthieux; Émilien Jacquelin; Martin Fourcade; Antonin Guigonnat	1:18:43.1; 20:12.1; 19:06.0; 20:01.2; 19:23.8	0+4 3+8; 0+2 2+3; 0+0 0+1; 0+1 1+3; 0+1 0+1	+3:26.6
6	17	United States Lowell Bailey; Sean Doherty; Tim Burke; Leif Nordgren	1:19:06.7; 19:14.2; 19:14.0; 19:32.5; 21:06.0	2+6 0+8; 0+2 0+2; 0+1 0+0; 0+0 0+3; 2+3 0+3	+3:50.2
7	11	Czech Republic Ondřej Moravec; Michal Šlesingr; Jaroslav Soukup; Michal Krčmář	1:19:23.6; 18:58.1; 18:36.5; 20:40.3; 21:08.7	0+4 2+9; 0+0 0+3; 0+1 0+0; 0+1 1+3; 0+2 1+3	+4:07.1
8	16	Belarus Anton Smolski; Raman Yaliotnau; Sergey Bocharnikov; Vladimir Chepelin	1:20:06.0; 18:51.4; 19:55.8; 21:02.4; 20:16.4	2+6 1+6; 0+0 0+1; 0+1 1+3; 2+3 0+1; 0+2 0+1	+4:49.5
9	9	Ukraine Artem Pryma; Serhiy Semenov; Vladimir Semakov; Dmytro Pidruchnyi	1:20:17.3; 18:47.5; 20:19.4; 20:55.7; 20:14.7	0+0 2+9; 0+0 0+0; 0+0 0+3; 0+0 1+3; 0+0 1+3	+5:00.8
10	10	Slovenia Miha Dovžan; Klemen Bauer; Mitja Drinovec; Lenart Oblak	1:20:17.3; 19:33.5; 19:44.1; 20:23.1; 20:36.6	0+5 1+5; 0+0 0+2; 0+1 1+3; 0+3 0+0; 0+1 0+0	+5:00.8
11	12	Canada Christian Gow; Scott Gow; Macx Davies; Brendan Green	1:20:56.8; 19:11.8; 19:23.3; 22:16.0; 20:05.7	0+4 1+7; 0+0 0+3; 0+0 0+0; 0+3 1+3; 0+1 0+1	+5:40.3
12	5	Italy Thomas Bormolini; Lukas Hofer; Giuseppe Montello; Dominik Windisch	1:21:35.6; 20:03.8; 19:00.7; 20:37.5; 21:53.6	1+5 3+11; 0+1 0+3; 0+1 0+2; 0+0 1+3; 1+3 2+3	+6:19.1
13	13	Estonia Rene Zahkna; Kalev Ermits; Roland Lessing; Kauri Kõiv	1:22:26.4; 19:32.7; 20:05.6; 21:12.2; 21:35.9	1+5 2+10; 0+2 0+2; 0+0 1+3; 1+3 0+2; 0+0 1+3	+7:09.9
14	18	Romania George Buta; Remus Faur; Gheorghe Pop; Cornel Puchianu	1:22:51.1; 20:32.7; 20:16.9; 20:25.6; 21:35.9	0+1 2+7; 0+0 0+1; 0+0 0+2; 0+1 0+1; 0+0 2+3	+7:34.6
15	6	Switzerland Serafin Wiestner; Benjamin Weger; Jeremy Finello; Mario Dolder	1:23:06.1; 21:30.0; 19:17.2; 20:22.6; 21:56.3	2+8 3+11; 2+3 0+3; 0+3 0+2; 0+2 0+3; 0+0 3+3	+7:49.6
16	7	Bulgaria Krasimir Anev; Anton Sinapov; Dimitar Gerdzhikov; Vladimir Iliev	LAP; 19:59.9; 19:52.2; LAP	1+5 2+8; 0+0 1+3; 0+2 0+2; 1+3 1+3	
17	14	Kazakhstan Maxim Braun; Vassiliy Podkorytov; Vladislav Vitenko; Roman Yeremin	LAP; 20:13.2; 20:55.7; LAP	0+5 2+5; 0+0 0+1; 0+3 0+1; 0+2 2+3	
18	15	Slovakia Matej Kazár; Tomáš Hasilla; Šimon Bartko; Martin Otčenáš	LAP; 18:42.0; 22:04.0; LAP	4+6 1+5; 0+0 0+0; 0+3 1+3; 4+3 0+2	
