= Biathlon at the 2018 Winter Olympics – Men's individual =

Men's individual at the XXIII Olympic Winter Games
- Pictogram for biathlon
- Venue: Alpensia Biathlon Centre in Pyeongchang, South Korea
- Date: 15 February 2018
- Competitors: 86 from 26 nations
- Winning time: 48:03.8

Medalists
1st place, gold medalist(s)		Johannes Thingnes Bø	Norway
2nd place, silver medalist(s)		Jakov Fak	Slovenia
3rd place, bronze medalist(s)		Dominik Landertinger	Austria

The men's 20 km individual biathlon competition of the Pyeongchang 2018 Olympics was held on 15 February 2018 at the Alpensia Biathlon Centre in Pyeongchang, South Korea.

== Schedule ==
All times are (UTC+9).

Date	Time	Round
15 February	20:20	Final

== Results ==
The race was started at 20:20.

Rank	Bib	Name	Country	Time	Penalties (P+S+P+S)	Deficit
1st place, gold medalist(s)	9	Johannes Thingnes Bø	Norway	48:03.8	2 (1+0+0+1)	—
2nd place, silver medalist(s)	57	Jakov Fak	Slovenia	48:09.3	0 (0+0+0+0)	+5.5
3rd place, bronze medalist(s)	38	Dominik Landertinger	Austria	48:18.0	0 (0+0+0+0)	+14.2
4	51	Sebastian Samuelsson	Sweden	48:32.9	1 (0+0+1+0)	+29.1
5	23	Martin Fourcade	France	48:46.2	2 (0+0+0+2)	+42.4
6	28	Benjamin Weger	Switzerland	48:52.4	1 (1+0+0+0)	+48.6
7	65	Michal Krčmář	Czech Republic	49:19.3	1 (0+1+0+0)	+1:15.5
8	1	Fredrik Lindström	Sweden	49:25.9	1 (0+0+0+1)	+1:22.1
9	16	Erik Lesser	Germany	49:31.1	1 (0+1+0+0)	+1:27.3
10	11	Emil Hegle Svendsen	Norway	49:40.5	2 (0+2+0+0)	+1:36.7
11	19	Simon Eder	Austria	49:55.8	2 (1+0+1+0)	+1:52.0
12	7	Ondřej Moravec	Czech Republic	49:56.9	1 (0+0+0+1)	+1:53.1
13	27	Tarjei Bø	Norway	50:05.3	2 (0+0+0+2)	+2:01.5
14	24	Scott Gow	Canada	50:06.3	1 (0+0+0+1)	+2:02.5
15	41	Klemen Bauer	Slovenia	50:07.0	2 (0+2+0+0)	+2:03.2
16	35	Anton Babikov	Olympic Athletes from Russia	50:08.0	1 (0+0+1+0)	+2:04.2
17	25	Julian Eberhard	Austria	50:15.6	3 (1+1+0+1)	+2:11.8
18	64	Sergey Bocharnikov	Belarus	50:25.3	1 (0+0+0+1)	+2:21.5
19	5	Vladimir Iliev	Bulgaria	50:25.9	3 (0+1+1+1)	+2:22.1
20	6	Timofey Lapshin	South Korea	50:28.6	1 (0+1+0+0)	+2:24.8
21	18	Arnd Peiffer	Germany	50:29.6	3 (0+0+3+0)	+2:25.8
22	76	Brendan Green	Canada	50:30.4	1 (0+0+0+1)	+2:26.6
23	4	Antonin Guigonnat	France	50:33.5	2 (0+2+0+0)	+2:29.7
24	61	Jesper Nelin	Sweden	50:37.1	3 (0+0+0+3)	+2:33.3
25	42	Krasimir Anev	Bulgaria	50:41.8	1 (0+0+0+1)	+2:38.0
26	30	Christian Gow	Canada	51:01.0	2 (1+0+0+1)	+2:57.2
27	13	Simon Desthieux	France	51:03.6	4 (0+2+1+1)	+2:59.8
28	26	Matvey Eliseev	Olympic Athletes from Russia	51:07.1	3 (0+2+0+1)	+3:03.3
29	79	Artem Tyshchenko	Ukraine	51:15.2	0 (0+0+0+0)	+3:11.4
30	14	Vladimir Chepelin	Belarus	51:27.9	3 (1+0+1+1)	+3:24.1
31	60	Vladimir Semakov	Ukraine	51:32.1	1 (0+1+0+0)	+3:28.3
32	8	Kalev Ermits	Estonia	51:43.6	2 (1+0+1+0)	+3:39.8
33	29	Grzegorz Guzik	Poland	51:51.8	2 (0+0+1+1)	+3:48.0
34	53	Matej Kazár	Slovakia	51:52.4	2 (0+1+1+0)	+3:48.6
35	17	Miha Dovžan	Slovenia	51:54.2	2 (1+0+0+1)	+3:50.4
36	21	Simon Schempp	Germany	51:54.8	4 (2+2+0+0)	+3:51.0
37	59	George Buta	Romania	51:55.6	1 (0+0+1+0)	+3:51.8
38	77	Martin Ponsiluoma	Sweden	51:56.6	2 (2+0+0+0)	+3:52.8
39	81	Maksim Varabei	Belarus	52:01.3	3 (0+2+0+1)	+3:57.5
40	85	Giuseppe Montello	Italy	52:01.9	3 (1+1+0+1)	+3:58.1
41	52	Tim Burke	United States	52:05.7	4 (1+1+0+2)	+4:01.9
42	50	Oskars Muižnieks	Latvia	52:06.0	3 (0+2+0+1)	+4:02.2
43	80	Dimitar Gerdzhikov	Bulgaria	52:12.0	3 (2+0+1+0)	+4:08.2
44	68	Sean Doherty	United States	52:25.6	3 (2+0+1+0)	+4:21.8
45	56	Michal Šlesingr	Czech Republic	52:35.5	4 (0+3+0+1)	+4:31.7
46	10	Artem Pryma	Ukraine	52:36.5	4 (1+2+0+1)	+4:32.7
47	39	Jeremy Finello	Switzerland	52:37.5	3 (0+1+0+2)	+4:33.7
48	20	Tuomas Grönman	Finland	52:44.1	3 (0+2+0+1)	+4:40.3
49	2	Mario Dolder	Switzerland	52:46.5	3 (0+1+0+2)	+4:42.7
50	55	Dominik Windisch	Italy	52:54.3	5 (2+0+3+0)	+4:50.5
51	3	Lowell Bailey	United States	52:56.8	4 (2+1+0+1)	+4:53.0
52	33	Raman Yaliotnau	Belarus	52:57.6	5 (1+2+1+1)	+4:53.8
53	45	Serhiy Semenov	Ukraine	52:57.9	3 (1+0+1+1)	+4:54.1
54	22	Florent Claude	Belgium	53:03.2	2 (0+0+0+2)	+4:59.4
55	48	Cornel Puchianu	Romania	53:12.1	4 (0+2+0+2)	+5:08.3
56	71	Thomas Bormolini	Italy	53:26.6	4 (0+1+2+1)	+5:22.8
57	70	Tobias Eberhard	Austria	53:33.6	4 (1+1+0+2)	+5:29.8
58	49	Johannes Kühn	Germany	53:36.6	6 (1+1+1+3)	+5:32.8
59	15	Andrejs Rastorgujevs	Latvia	53:41.8	6 (1+1+3+1)	+5:38.0
60	47	Lars Helge Birkeland	Norway	53:46.8	4 (2+1+1+0)	+5:43.0
61	44	Maxim Braun	Kazakhstan	53:50.7	2 (0+1+0+1)	+5:46.9
62	62	Vassiliy Podkorytov	Kazakhstan	53:52.5	2 (1+0+1+0)	+5:48.7
63	32	Lukas Hofer	Italy	53:54.1	5 (1+2+1+1)	+5:50.3
64	40	Mikito Tachizaki	Japan	54:11.5	3 (0+1+2+0)	+6:07.7
65	67	Rene Zahkna	Estonia	54:20.1	4 (1+1+1+1)	+6:16.3
66	84	Leif Nordgren	United States	54:31.1	5 (1+1+3+0)	+6:27.3
67	82	Adam Václavík	Czech Republic	54:31.7	6 (0+4+1+1)	+6:27.9
68	74	Kauri Kõiv	Estonia	54:36.4	3 (0+0+0+3)	+6:32.6
69	83	Gheorghe Pop	Romania	54:40.1	3 (2+0+1+0)	+6:36.3
70	37	Roland Lessing	Estonia	54:46.0	4 (0+1+2+1)	+6:42.2
71	63	Anton Sinapov	Bulgaria	54:48.4	5 (0+2+0+3)	+6:44.6
72	86	Timur Khamitgatin	Kazakhstan	54:52.7	2 (0+2+0+0)	+6:48.9
73	66	Olli Hiidensalo	Finland	54:57.6	5 (0+1+3+1)	+6:53.8
74	46	Remus Faur	Romania	55:01.5	4 (0+0+0+4)	+6:57.7
75	78	Michael Rösch	Belgium	55:10.1	5 (0+3+0+2)	+7:06.3
76	36	Tero Seppälä	Finland	55:10.8	6 (0+2+2+2)	+7:07.0
77	54	Émilien Jacquelin	France	55:26.1	7 (2+2+2+1)	+7:22.3
78	31	Tomas Kaukėnas	Lithuania	55:38.4	6 (0+2+1+3)	+7:34.6
79	43	Andrzej Nędza-Kubiniec	Poland	55:39.9	5 (2+1+1+1)	+7:36.1
80	73	Mitja Drinovec	Slovenia	56:06.4	5 (2+1+2+0)	+8:02.6
81	72	Nathan Smith	Canada	56:15.7	5 (0+1+4+0)	+8:11.9
82	58	Vytautas Strolia	Lithuania	56:27.0	6 (0+2+1+3)	+8:23.2
83	34	Vladislav Vitenko	Kazakhstan	57:11.3	7 (2+2+1+2)	+9:07.5
84	12	Martin Otčenáš	Slovakia	57:16.0	5 (1+2+0+2)	+9:12.2
85	75	Michal Šíma	Slovakia	57:52.3	6 (1+1+2+2)	+9:48.5
86	69	Tomáš Hasilla	Slovakia	58:55.2	9 (3+1+3+2)	+10:51.4
