= Biathlon World Championships 2017 – Men's sprint =

Men's sprint at the Biathlon World Championships 2017
- Location: Hochfilzen, Austria
- Dates: 11 February
- Competitors: 102 from 32 nations
- Winning time: 23:27.4

Medalists
gold medal	Benedikt Doll	Germany
silver medal	Johannes Thingnes Bø	Norway
bronze medal	Martin Fourcade	France

The Men's sprint competition at the 2017 World Championships was held on 11 February 2017 at 14:45 local time.

== Results ==
Rank	Bib	Name	Nationality	Penalties (P+S)	Time	Deficit
1st place, gold medalist(s)	82	Benedikt Doll	Germany	0 (0+0)	23:27.4	—
2nd place, silver medalist(s)	96	Johannes Thingnes Bø	Norway	0 (0+0)	23:28.1	+0.7
3rd place, bronze medalist(s)	4	Martin Fourcade	France	2 (1+1)	23:50.5	+23.1
4	77	Lowell Bailey	United States	0 (0+0)	23:56.9	+29.5
5	81	Ondřej Moravec	Czech Republic	1 (0+1)	23:58.1	+30.7
6	40	Krasimir Anev	Bulgaria	0 (0+0)	24:00.9	+33.5
7	10	Julian Eberhard	Austria	2 (1+1)	24:02.7	+35.3
8	55	Ole Einar Bjørndalen	Norway	1 (0+1)	24:05.8	+38.4
9	34	Simon Schempp	Germany	1 (1+0)	24:07.4	+40.0
10	9	Evgeniy Garanichev	Russia	1 (1+0)	24:12.5	+45.1
11	62	Anton Sinapov	Bulgaria	0 (0+0)	24:15.1	+47.7
12	32	Arnd Peiffer	Germany	2 (0+2)	24:15.6	+48.2
13	1	Vladimir Iliev	Bulgaria	1 (1+0)	24:15.7	+48.3
14	84	Tarjei Bø	Norway	1 (0+1)	24:17.2	+49.8
15	64	Mario Dolder	Switzerland	0 (0+0)	24:31.9	+1:04.5
16	65	Tomáš Hasilla	Slovakia	0 (0+0)	24:34.3	+1:06.9
17	18	Dominik Landertinger	Austria	3 (1+2)	24:38.9	+1:11.5
18	2	Dominik Windisch	Italy	2 (1+1)	24:39.8	+1:12.4
18	48	Serafin Wiestner	Switzerland	2 (0+2)	24:39.8	+1:12.4
20	30	Cornel Puchianu	Romania	1 (1+0)	24:41.0	+1:13.6
21	52	Anton Shipulin	Russia	3 (1+2)	24:42.1	+1:14.7
22	57	Simon Eder	Austria	3 (1+2)	24:44.4	+1:17.0
23	74	Remus Faur	Romania	0 (0+0)	24:46.8	+1:19.4
24	5	Yan Savitskiy	Kazakhstan	2 (0+2)	24:49.6	+1:22.2
25	16	Scott Gow	Canada	2 (1+1)	24:49.8	+1:22.4
26	14	Leif Nordgren	United States	1 (0+1)	24:51.7	+1:24.3
27	7	Jean-Guillaume Béatrix	France	2 (2+0)	24:52.2	+1:24.8
28	49	Dmytro Pidruchnyi	Ukraine	2 (1+1)	24:53.5	+1:26.1
29	33	Kauri Kõiv	Estonia	0 (0+0)	24:53.8	+1:26.4
30	80	Fredrik Lindström	Sweden	2 (0+2)	24:54.2	+1:26.8
31	15	Tomas Kaukėnas	Lithuania	1 (0+1)	24:57.9	+1:30.5
32	24	Christian Gow	Canada	0 (0+0)	24:58.0	+1:30.6
33	88	Klemen Bauer	Slovenia	1 (0+1)	24:58.9	+1:31.5
34	42	Adam Václavík	Czech Republic	4 (2+2)	25:01.2	+1:33.8
34	46	Simon Desthieux	France	3 (2+1)	25:01.2	+1:33.8
36	101	Emil Hegle Svendsen	Norway	2 (1+1)	25:01.3	+1:33.9
37	22	Erik Lesser	Germany	3 (0+3)	25:02.9	+1:35.5
38	58	Brendan Green	Canada	1 (1+0)	25:03.8	+1:36.4
39	97	Sean Doherty	United States	2 (2+0)	25:05.1	+1:37.7
40	43	Tim Burke	United States	2 (0+2)	25:06.0	+1:38.6
41	11	Serhiy Semenov	Ukraine	3 (0+3)	25:07.7	+1:40.3
42	86	Michal Šlesingr	Czech Republic	3 (2+1)	25:07.8	+1:40.4
43	20	Quentin Fillon Maillet	France	4 (1+3)	25:08.8	+1:41.4
44	47	Giuseppe Montello	Italy	2 (1+1)	25:09.0	+1:41.6
45	100	Sergey Bocharnikov	Belarus	2 (0+2)	25:13.0	+1:45.6
46	79	Thomas Bormolini	Italy	1 (0+1)	25:13.8	+1:46.4
47	51	Martin Otčenáš	Slovakia	2 (0+2)	25:15.4	+1:48.0
48	38	Olli Hiidensalo	Finland	1 (0+1)	25:16.0	+1:48.6
49	29	Anton Babikov	Russia	3 (1+2)	25:16.4	+1:49.0
50	36	Daniel Mesotitsch	Austria	2 (1+1)	25:24.9	+1:57.5
51	19	Michael Rösch	Belgium	3 (2+1)	25:26.1	+1:58.7
52	66	Roland Lessing	Estonia	3 (2+1)	25:26.7	+1:59.3
53	92	Grzegorz Guzik	Poland	1 (0+1)	25:27.7	+2:00.3
54	71	Vytautas Strolia	Lithuania	1 (1+0)	25:28.9	+2:01.5
55	6	Benjamin Weger	Switzerland	2 (0+2)	25:31.8	+2:04.4
56	3	Lukas Hofer	Italy	2 (1+1)	25:32.6	+2:05.2
57	93	Andrejs Rastorgujevs	Latvia	4 (3+1)	25:35.2	+2:07.8
58	87	Oleksander Zhyrnyi	Ukraine	2 (2+0)	25:37.2	+2:09.8
59	12	Jesper Nelin	Sweden	3 (1+2)	25:37.7	+2:10.3
60	26	Torstein Stenersen	Sweden	2 (2+0)	25:48.6	+2:21.2
61	67	Michal Krčmář	Czech Republic	4 (3+1)	25:49.7	+2:22.3
62	90	Michal Šíma	Slovakia	1 (1+0)	25:50.0	+2:22.6
63	78	Maxim Braun	Kazakhstan	2 (1+1)	25:52.2	+2:24.8
64	56	Miha Dovžan	Slovenia	3 (2+1)	25:52.4	+2:25.0
65	45	Vladimir Chepelin	Belarus	4 (1+3)	25:53.1	+2:25.7
66	13	Tuomas Grönman	Finland	2 (1+1)	25:56.0	+2:28.6
67	39	Mikito Tachizaki	Japan	2 (0+2)	25:56.4	+2:29.0
68	23	Anton Pantov	Kazakhstan	2 (0+2)	25:57.8	+2:30.4
69	53	Maxim Tsvetkov	Russia	3 (2+1)	26:00.8	+2:33.4
70	91	Dimitar Gerdzhikov	Bulgaria	2 (1+1)	26:01.0	+2:33.6
71	69	Tero Seppälä	Finland	2 (1+1)	26:06.1	+2:38.7
72	70	Łukasz Szczurek	Poland	1 (1+0)	26:08.6	+2:41.2
73	73	Vladimir Semakov	Ukraine	2 (0+2)	26:11.1	+2:43.7
74	99	George Buta	Romania	2 (1+1)	26:12.7	+2:45.3
75	72	Tsukasa Kobonoki	Japan	3 (0+3)	26:13.7	+2:46.3
76	102	Sebastian Samuelsson	Sweden	4 (3+1)	26:17.5	+2:50.1
77	17	Matej Kazár	Slovakia	5 (4+1)	26:18.8	+2:51.4
78	98	Kalev Ermits	Estonia	3 (1+2)	26:19.6	+2:52.2
79	103	Macx Davies	Canada	3 (2+1)	26:20.8	+2:53.4
80	83	Kim Yong-gyu	South Korea	2 (2+0)	26:25.6	+2:58.2
81	94	Jeremy Finello	Switzerland	2 (1+1)	26:25.9	+2:58.5
82	68	Maksim Varabei	Belarus	4 (2+2)	26:26.6	+2:59.2
83	50	Krešimir Crnković	Croatia	5 (2+3)	26:30.8	+3:03.4
84	54	Ilmārs Bricis	Latvia	3 (1+2)	26:32.5	+3:05.1
85	75	Simon Fourcade	France	4 (3+1)	26:32.6	+3:05.2
86	85	Kosuke Ozaki	Japan	2 (1+1)	26:35.1	+3:07.7
87	59	Damon Morton	Australia	2 (1+1)	26:46.9	+3:19.5
88	61	Aleksandrs Patrijuks	Latvia	2 (0+2)	26:53.7	+3:26.3
89	31	Lee In-bok	South Korea	2 (1+1)	27:01.9	+3:34.5
90	25	Thierry Langer	Belgium	2 (1+1)	27:16.4	+3:49.0
91	27	Károly Gombos	Hungary	1 (0+1)	27:22.0	+3:54.6
92	8	Raman Yaliotnau	Belarus	7 (2+5)	27:28.8	+4:01.4
93	37	Rok Tršan	Slovenia	3 (0+3)	27:33.0	+4:05.6
94	35	Rafał Penar	Poland	2 (1+1)	27:41.0	+4:13.6
95	41	Karol Dombrovski	Lithuania	4 (1+3)	27:49.6	+4:22.2
96	89	Kim Jong-min	South Korea	3 (2+1)	27:56.9	+4:29.5
97	21	Dejan Krsmanović	Serbia	4 (3+1)	28:06.6	+4:39.2
98	28	Scott Dixon	Great Britain	5 (4+1)	28:11.2	+4:43.8
99	60	Edin Hodžić	Serbia	5 (3+2)	28:27.3	+4:59.9
100	76	Filip Petrović	Croatia	4 (2+2)	28:30.9	+5:03.5
101	95	Apostolos Angelis	Greece	4 (1+3)	29:06.0	+5:38.6
102	63	Vinny Fountain	Great Britain	5 (1+4)	29:15.0	+5:47.6
—	44	Mehmet Üstüntaş	Turkey	DNS		
