= Biathlon at the 2018 Winter Olympics – Men's pursuit =

Men's pursuit at the XXIII Olympic Winter Games
- Venue: Alpensia Biathlon Centre in Pyeongchang, South Korea
- Date: 12 February 2018
- Competitors: 60 from 25 nations
- Winning time: 32:51.7

Medalists
| 1st place, gold medalist(s) | | Martin Fourcade | France |
| 2nd place, silver medalist(s) | | Sebastian Samuelsson | Sweden |
| 3rd place, bronze medalist(s) | | Benedikt Doll | Germany |

The men's 12.5 km pursuit competition of the Pyeongchang 2018 Olympics was held on 12 February 2018 at the Alpensia Biathlon Centre in Pyeongchang, South Korea. The field was the same as for the sprint event, held on the previous day, with competitors starting time dependent on their final time in the sprint event.

== Summary ==
The sprint champion, Arnd Peiffer, started on the first place. The starting intervals were very short, with number 10 starting merely half a minute behind Peiffer.

In the victory ceremony the day after, the medals were presented by Denis Oswald, member of the International Olympic Committee Executive Board, accompanied by Thomas Pfueller, IBU Vice President of Marketing.

== Schedule ==
All times are (UTC+9).

| Date | Time | Round |
|---|---|---|
| 12 February | 21:00 | Final |

== Results ==
The race was started at 21:00.

| Rank | Bib | Name | Country | Start | Time | Penalties (P+P+S+S) | Deficit |
|---|---|---|---|---|---|---|---|
| 1st place, gold medalist(s) | 8 | Martin Fourcade | France | 0:22 | 32:51.7 | 1 (1+0+0+0) | — |
| 2nd place, silver medalist(s) | 14 | Sebastian Samuelsson | Sweden | 0:34 | 33:03.7 | 1 (0+0+1+0) | +12.0 |
| 3rd place, bronze medalist(s) | 6 | Benedikt Doll | Germany | 0:18 | 33:06.8 | 1 (0+1+0+0) | +15.1 |
| 4 | 13 | Tarjei Bø | Norway | 0:34 | 33:54.3 | 3 (0+0+1+2) | +1:02.6 |
| 5 | 7 | Simon Schempp | Germany | 0:21 | 33:54.4 | 3 (0+0+1+2) | +1:02.7 |
| 6 | 15 | Benjamin Weger | Switzerland | 0:37 | 33:54.8 | 2 (1+0+0+1) | +1:03.1 |
| 7 | 12 | Simon Desthieux | France | 0:32 | 33:55.4 | 3 (1+0+1+1) | +1:03.7 |
| 8 | 1 | Arnd Peiffer | Germany | 0:00 | 34:05.8 | 3 (0+0+1+2) | +1:14.1 |
| 9 | 5 | Erlend Bjøntegaard | Norway | 0:17 | 34:18.0 | 4 (1+0+0+3) | +1:26.3 |
| 10 | 10 | Lukas Hofer | Italy | 0:31 | 34:24.4 | 3 (1+1+1+0) | +1:32.7 |
| 11 | 11 | Erik Lesser | Germany | 0:32 | 34:27.6 | 2 (0+0+1+1) | +1:35.9 |
| 12 | 24 | Andrejs Rastorgujevs | Latvia | 0:56 | 34:29.3 | 4 (1+0+1+2) | +1:37.6 |
| 13 | 17 | Tomas Kaukėnas | Lithuania | 0:45 | 34:31.8 | 2 (0+0+1+1) | +1:40.1 |
| 14 | 28 | Simon Eder | Austria | 1:04 | 34:33.1 | 2 (0+0+0+2) | +1:41.4 |
| 15 | 4 | Julian Eberhard | Austria | 0:08 | 34:36.9 | 6 (0+1+3+2) | +1:45.2 |
| 16 | 3 | Dominik Windisch | Italy | 0:08 | 34:57.9 | 5 (2+0+0+3) | +2:06.2 |
| 17 | 47 | Tim Burke | United States | 1:48 | 35:11.3 | 2 (0+1+1+0) | +2:19.6 |
| 18 | 30 | Jesper Nelin | Sweden | 1:08 | 35:15.5 | 4 (0+1+1+2) | +2:23.8 |
| 19 | 27 | Antonin Guigonnat | France | 0:59 | 35:27.9 | 5 (2+1+0+2) | +2:36.2 |
| 20 | 18 | Emil Hegle Svendsen | Norway | 0:45 | 35:33.2 | 5 (0+2+2+1) | +2:41.5 |
| 21 | 31 | Johannes Thingnes Bø | Norway | 1:13 | 35:42.7 | 6 (0+2+4+0) | +2:51.0 |
| 22 | 16 | Timofey Lapshin | South Korea | 0:44 | 35:50.7 | 4 (1+0+2+1) | +2:59.0 |
| 23 | 38 | Michael Rösch | Belgium | 1:31 | 35:55.1 | 1 (0+0+0+1) | +3:03.4 |
| 24 | 26 | Klemen Bauer | Slovenia | 0:58 | 35:55.9 | 6 (2+0+2+2) | +3:04.2 |
| 25 | 20 | Tero Seppälä | Finland | 0:49 | 36:09.9 | 5 (1+1+3+0) | +3:18.2 |
| 26 | 25 | Dominik Landertinger | Austria | 0:57 | 36:22.2 | 5 (0+0+1+4) | +3:30.5 |
| 27 | 52 | Martin Otčenáš | Slovakia | 2:01 | 36:22.5 | 3 (0+0+3+0) | +3:30.8 |
| 28 | 9 | Serafin Wiestner | Switzerland | 0:24 | 36:37.0 | 6 (0+1+3+2) | +3:45.3 |
| 29 | 39 | Fredrik Lindström | Sweden | 1:35 | 36:41.5 | 5 (0+2+2+1) | +3:49.8 |
| 30 | 2 | Michal Krčmář | Czech Republic | 0:04 | 36:41.6 | 7 (2+0+3+2) | +3:49.9 |
| 31 | 22 | Matej Kazár | Slovakia | 0:55 | 36:42.4 | 5 (1+2+1+1) | +3:50.7 |
| 32 | 33 | Lowell Bailey | United States | 1:16 | 36:43.3 | 5 (0+0+3+2) | +3:51.6 |
| 33 | 35 | Anton Smolski | Belarus | 1:27 | 36:44.1 | 3 (1+1+1+0) | +3:52.4 |
| 34 | 21 | Dmytro Pidruchnyi | Ukraine | 0:49 | 36:53.2 | 4 (1+0+2+1) | +4:01.5 |
| 35 | 19 | Olli Hiidensalo | Finland | 0:48 | 37:03.9 | 7 (1+2+1+3) | +4:12.2 |
| 36 | 34 | Vladimir Chepelin | Belarus | 1:26 | 37:04.6 | 6 (0+0+3+3) | +4:12.9 |
| 37 | 42 | Sergey Bocharnikov | Belarus | 1:42 | 37:15.6 | 6 (1+3+0+2) | +4:23.9 |
| 38 | 40 | Artem Pryma | Ukraine | 1:36 | 37:16.3 | 6 (1+1+2+2) | +4:24.6 |
| 39 | 50 | Giuseppe Montello | Italy | 1:57 | 37:21.7 | 3 (0+0+2+1) | +4:30.0 |
| 40 | 57 | Anton Babikov | Olympic Athletes from Russia | 2:10 | 37:21.8 | 4 (1+1+2+0) | +4:30.1 |
| 41 | 36 | Kalev Ermits | Estonia | 1:28 | 37:43.0 | 6 (1+3+0+2) | +4:51.3 |
| 42 | 32 | Peppe Femling | Sweden | 1:13 | 37:45.8 | 5 (1+1+1+2) | +4:54.1 |
| 43 | 49 | Vytautas Strolia | Lithuania | 1:54 | 37:47.3 | 4 (1+0+2+1) | +4:55.6 |
| 44 | 48 | Quentin Fillon Maillet | France | 1:49 | 37:57.2 | 7 (3+0+2+2) | +5:05.5 |
| 45 | 37 | Krasimir Anev | Bulgaria | 1:30 | 37:57.9 | 5 (0+0+3+2) | +5:06.2 |
| 46 | 54 | Vladimir Iliev | Bulgaria | 2:04 | 38:08.7 | 7 (1+3+2+1) | +5:17.0 |
| 47 | 23 | Jakov Fak | Slovenia | 0:55 | 38:10.4 | 6 (2+1+3+0) | +5:18.7 |
| 48 | 51 | Thomas Bormolini | Italy | 2:01 | 38:10.7 | 6 (1+0+4+1) | +5:19.0 |
| 49 | 46 | Serhiy Semenov | Ukraine | 1:46 | 38:23.7 | 5 (1+0+2+2) | +5:32.0 |
| 50 | 58 | Leif Nordgren | United States | 2:10 | 38:40.4 | 5 (2+2+0+1) | +5:48.7 |
| 51 | 29 | Ondřej Moravec | Czech Republic | 1:08 | 38:45.9 | 8 (1+2+2+3) | +5:54.2 |
| 52 | 43 | Roman Yeremin | Kazakhstan | 1:43 | 38:51.1 | 8 (2+1+2+3) | +5:59.4 |
| 53 | 41 | Roland Lessing | Estonia | 1:41 | 38:54.4 | 7 (2+1+3+1) | +6:02.7 |
| 54 | 44 | Nathan Smith | Canada | 1:44 | 38:58.2 | 4 (0+0+1+3) | +6:06.5 |
| 55 | 45 | Tuomas Grönman | Finland | 1:46 | 38:58.9 | 6 (0+1+2+3) | +6:07.2 |
| 56 | 59 | Grzegorz Guzik | Poland | 2:13 | 39:07.3 | 6 (2+1+2+1) | +6:15.6 |
| 57 | 55 | Florent Claude | Belgium | 2:05 | 39:22.7 | 4 (1+1+1+1) | +6:31.0 |
| 58 | 60 | Cornel Puchianu | Romania | 2:14 | 39:37.6 | 5 (1+1+2+1) | +6:45.9 |
| 59 | 53 | Miha Dovžan | Slovenia | 2:03 | 40:13.2 | 7 (0+1+3+3) | +7:21.5 |
| 60 | 56 | Anton Sinapov | Bulgaria | 2:09 | 40:49.1 | 8 (0+1+3+4) | +7:57.4 |
