= Luge at the 2018 Winter Olympics – Qualification =

The following is about the qualification rules and the quota allocation for the luge at the 2018 Winter Olympics.

== Qualification rules ==
The qualification is based on the cumulative world ranking points from the first five world cup events of the 2017–18 season. A total of 110 quota spots are available to athletes to compete at the games. A maximum 37 men, 27 women, and 17 doubles teams will initially qualify. Each NOC can enter a maximum of three men, three women, and two doubles. The host then has the right to enter a competitor in the men's, doubles, and women's competitions provided they meet minimum standards. Then eight athletes will be added, first to fill the highest ranked relay teams who did not qualify individuals in all three disciplines, then the remaining quotas will be distributed equally among the three disciplines.

The team relay will consist of all nations who can form a relay team from qualified athletes. They must have participated in relay competitions during qualification. There will be three relay races during qualification.

== Quota allocation ==
Current allocation is according to the world rankings following World Cup 5 ending 16 December 2017.

=== Current summary ===
As of 28 January 2018.

| Nations | Men's | Doubles | Women's | Relay | Athletes |
|---|---|---|---|---|---|
| Argentina | | | 1 | | 1 |
| Australia | 1 | | | | 1 |
| Austria | 3 | 2 | 3 | x | 10 |
| Bulgaria | 1 | | | | 1 |
| Canada | 3 | 1 | 3 | x | 8 |
| Croatia | | | 1 | | 1 |
| Czech Republic | 1 | 2 | 1 | x | 6 |
| Georgia | 1 | | | | 1 |
| Germany | 3 | 2 | 3 | x | 10 |
| Great Britain | 2 | | | | 2 |
| India | 1 | | | | 1 |
| Italy | 3 | 2 | 2 | x | 9 |
| Kazakhstan | 1 | | | | 1 |
| Latvia | 3 | 2 | 3 | x | 10 |
| Olympic Athletes from Russia | 3 | 2 | 1 | x | 8 |
| Poland | 2 | 1 | 2 | x | 6 |
| Romania | 2 | 1 | 1 | x | 5 |
| Slovakia | 2 | 1 | 1 | x | 5 |
| Slovenia | 1 | | | | 1 |
| South Korea | 1 | 1 | 2 | x | 5 |
| Switzerland | | | 1 | | 1 |
| Chinese Taipei | 1 | | | | 1 |
| Ukraine | 2 | 1 | 2 | x | 6 |
| United States | 3 | 2 | 3 | x | 10 |
| Total: 24 NOCs | 40 | 20 | 30 | 13 | 110 |

=== Men's ===
| Number of sleds | Athletes total | Nation |
|---|---|---|
| 3 | 21 | Austria; Canada; Germany; Italy; Latvia; Olympic Athletes from Russia; United States |
| 2 | 10 | Great Britain; Poland; Romania; Slovakia; ~~Slovenia~~; Ukraine |
| 1 | 9 | Slovenia; Australia; Bulgaria; Czech Republic; Georgia; India; South Korea; Chinese Taipei; Kazakhstan^{1} |
| 40 | 40 | |

1. Slovenia elected to use only one of its quota places. Declined quota was reallocated to Kazakhstan.

=== Doubles ===
Teams in italics gained entry by use of additional quotas to form a relay team

| Number of sleds | Athletes total | Nation |
|---|---|---|
| 2 | 28 | Austria; Czech Republic; Germany; Italy; Latvia; Olympic Athletes from Russia; United States |
| 1 | 12 | Canada; Poland; Slovakia; South Korea^{1} Ukraine; Romania |
| 20 | 40 | |

1. South Korea qualified as the host.

=== Women's ===
Teams in italics gained entry by use of additional quotas to form a relay team

| Number of sleds | Athletes total | Nation |
|---|---|---|
| 3 | 15 | Austria; Canada; Germany; Latvia; ~~Olympic Athletes from Russia~~^{2} United States |
| 2 | 8 | Italy; Poland; South Korea; ~~Switzerland~~^{1} Ukraine^{2} |
| 1 | 7 | Olympic Athletes from Russia; Switzerland; Romania; Czech Republic; Slovakia; Croatia^{1} Argentina^{2} |
| 30 | 30 | |

1. Switzerland elected to use only one of its quota places. Declined quota was reallocated to Croatia on 17 January 2018.
2. The FIL released a press statement indicated that team OAR would only use one female quota, unused quota places were reallocated to Argentina and Ukraine.

=== Team relay ===
Final team relay world ranking as of 9 December 2017. Teams in italics could not form an olympic relay team. Scores next to a nation indicate the "Team Relay nations rankings" for the purpose of identifying which team receives additional quotas first.

| Criteria | Teams | Nation |
|---|---|---|
| Nations with sleds in all events | 9 | Germany; Canada; Austria; United States; Latvia; Olympic Athletes from Russia; Poland; Italy; South Korea |
| Nations who needed an additional quota | 4 | Czech Republic 347; Romania 337; Slovakia 252; Ukraine 169; Great Britain 72; Kazakhstan 66 |
