= Marius Ungureanu =

Romanian biathlete (born 1994)

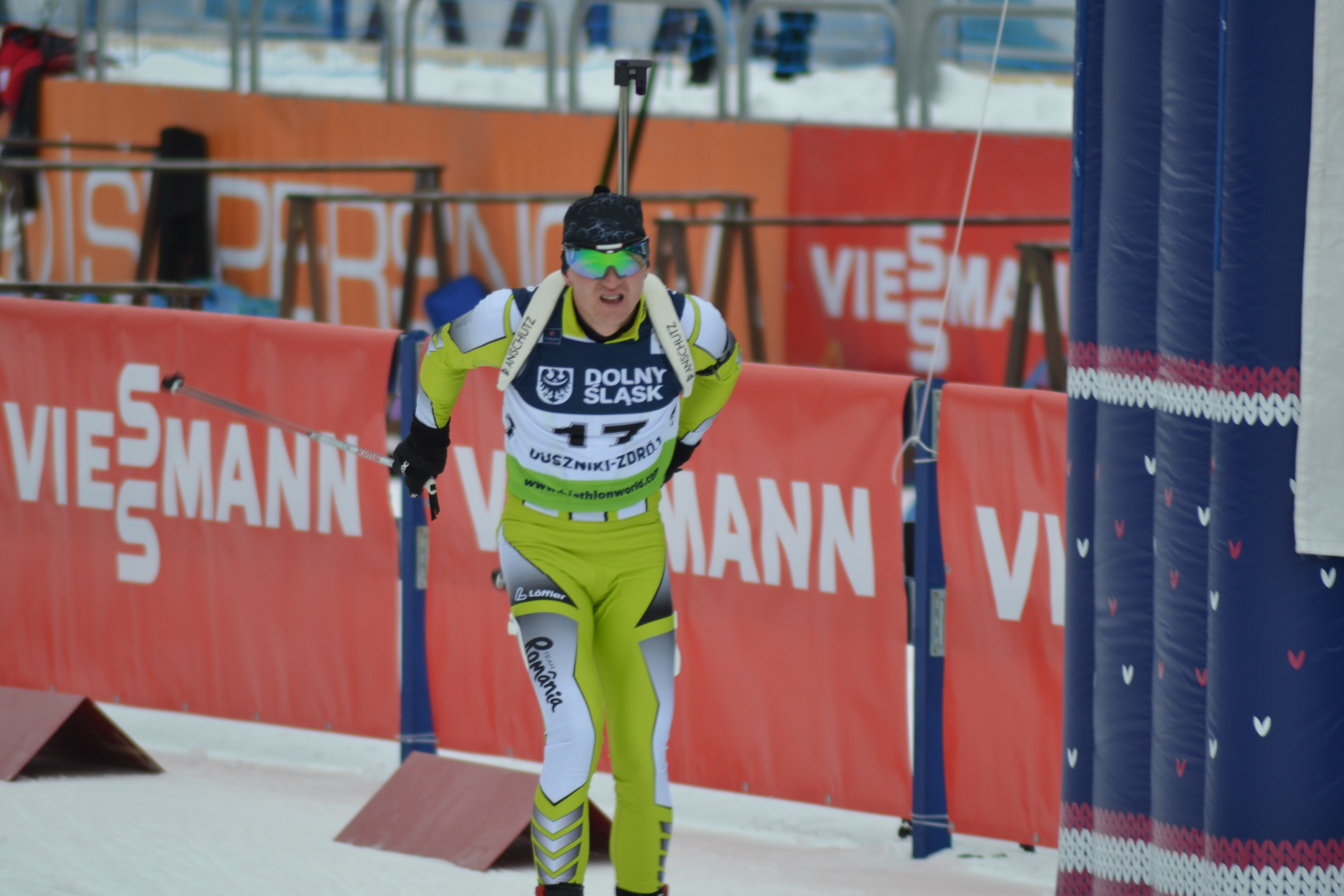
- Ungureanu in 2017

Personal information
- Full name: Marius Petru Ungureanu
- Nationality: Romanian
- Born: May 17, 1994 (age 32)

Sport
- Country: Romania
- Sport: Biathlon

Marius Petru Ungureanu (born 17 May 1994) is a biathlete who was the flag bearer for Romania at the 2018 Winter Olympics Parade of Nations.

== Biathlon results ==
All results are sourced from the International Biathlon Union.

=== Olympic Games ===
0 medals

Event	Individual	Sprint	Pursuit	Mass start	Relay	Mixed relay
(South Korea) 2018 Pyeongchang	—	87th	—	—	—	—

=== World Championships ===
1 medals

Event	Individual	Mass start	Mixed relay
Summer Biathlon Cheile Gradistei			
