= Dimitar Gerdzhikov =

Bulgarian biathlete (born 1992)

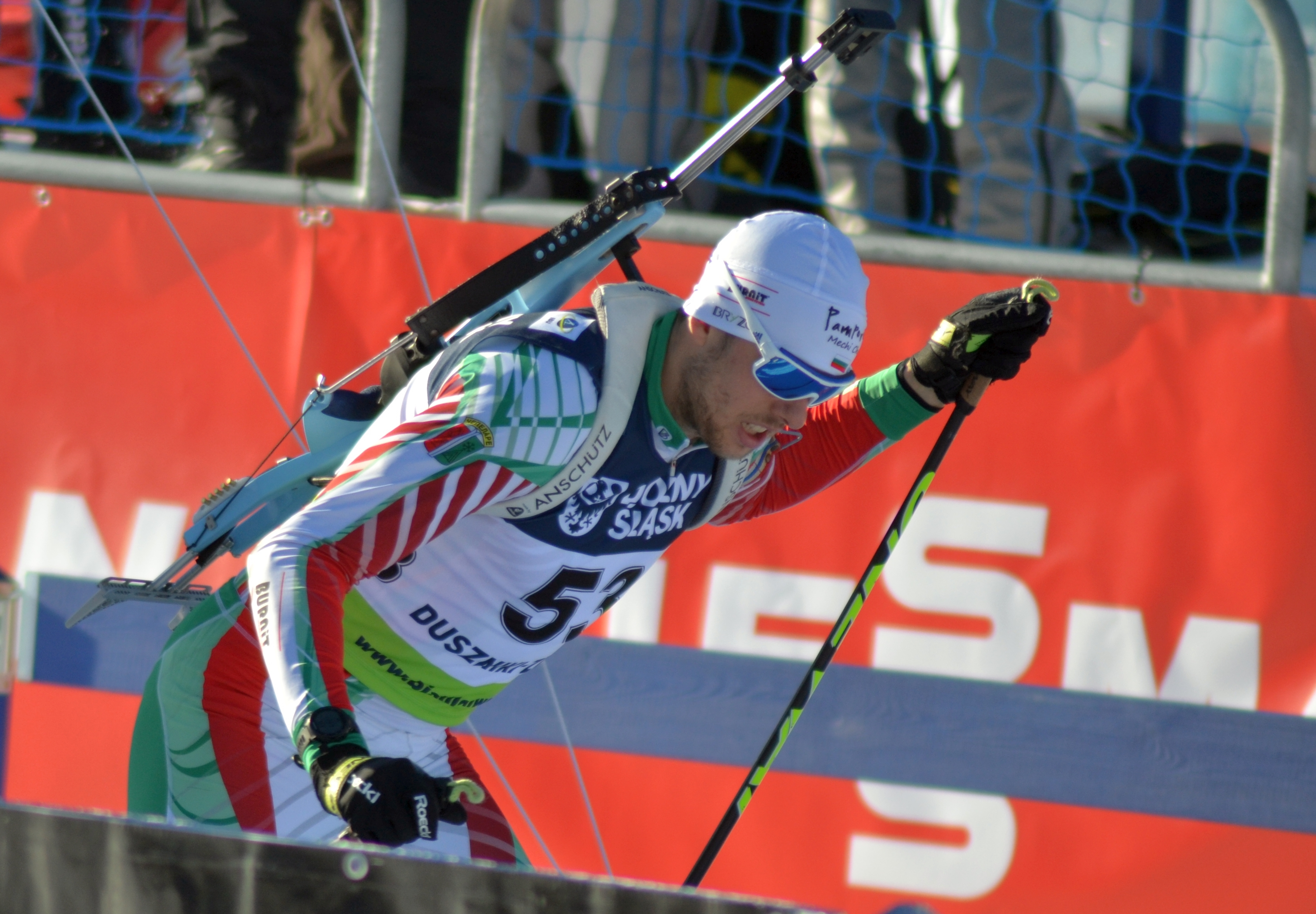
- Gerdzhikov in 2017

Personal information
- Nationality: Bulgarian
- Born: 27 March 1992 (age 32); Smolyan, Bulgaria

Sport
- Sport: Biathlon

Dimitar Gerdzhikov (Bulgarian: Димитър Герджиков; born 27 March 1992) is a retired Bulgarian biathlete. He competed in the 2018 Winter Olympics, where he finished 81st in the sprint and 43rd in the individual and was part of the lapped relay, and in 2022 Winter Olympics. His best individual result was 21st place at the individual in 2019, and the best relay result was 7th place, achieved in the 2014/15 season. He is engaged to fellow biathlete Desislava Stoyanova, from whom he has one child

== Biathlon results ==
All results are sourced from the International Biathlon Union.

=== Olympic Games ===
0 medals

Event	Individual	Sprint	Pursuit	Mass start	Relay	Mixed relay
(South Korea) 2018 Pyeongchang	43rd	81st	—	—	16th	—
(China) 2022 Beijing	41st	63rd	—	—	18th	19th

=== World Championships ===
0 medals

Event	Individual	Sprint	Pursuit	Mass start	Relay	Mixed relay	Single Mixed relay
(Austria) 2017 Hochfilzen	81st	70th	—	—	—	17th	—
(Sweden) 2019 Östersund	21st	56th	48th	—	9th	—	—
(Italy) 2020 Rasen-Antholz	77th	57th	52nd	—	11th	24th	—
(Slovenia) 2021 Pokljuka	49th	48th	LPD	—	16th	15th	—

*During Olympic seasons competitions are only held for those events not included in the Olympic program.
**The single mixed relay was added as an event in 2019.
