= Romania at the 2018 Winter Olympics =

- Flag of Romania
- IOC code: ROU
- NOC: Romanian Olympic Committee
- Website: www.cosr.ro (in Romanian)

in Pyeongchang, South Korea 9–25 February 2018
- Competitors: 27 (18 men and 9 women) in 8 sports
- Flag bearer: Marius Ungureanu
- Medals: Gold 0 Silver 0 Bronze 0 Total 0

Winter Olympics appearances (overview)
- 1928; 1932; 1936; 1948; 1952; 1956; 1960; 1964; 1968; 1972; 1976; 1980; 1984; 1988; 1992; 1994; 1998; 2002; 2006; 2010; 2014; 2018; 2022; 2026

Romania competed at the 2018 Winter Olympics in Pyeongchang, South Korea, from 9 to 25 February 2018, with 27 competitors in 8 sports.

== Competitors ==
The following is the list of number of competitors participating at the Games per sport/discipline.

Sport	Men	Women	Total
Alpine skiing	1	1	2
Biathlon	5	1	6
Bobsleigh	5	2	7
Cross-country skiing	2	1	3
Luge	4	1	5
Skeleton	1	1	2
Ski jumping	0	1	1
Speed skating	0	1	1
Total	18	9	27

== Alpine skiing ==
Romania qualified two athletes, one male and one female.

Athlete	Event	Run 1		Run 2		Total	
Athlete	Event	Time	Rank	Time	Rank	Time	Rank
Alexandru Barbu	Men's giant slalom	1:19.74	66	1:17.40	52	2:37.14	55
Alexandru Barbu	Men's slalom	DNF					
Ania Monica Caill	Women's downhill	—N/a				1:45.06	28
Ania Monica Caill	Women's super-G	—N/a				1:25.74	36
Ania Monica Caill	Women's giant slalom	DNS					

== Biathlon ==
Based on their Nations Cup ranking in the 2016–17 Biathlon World Cup, Romania has qualified 5 men.

Athlete	Event	Time	Misses	Rank
George Buta	Men's individual	51:55.6	1 (0+0+1+0)	37
Remus Faur	Men's sprint	26:03.3	1 (0+1)	68
Remus Faur	Men's individual	55:01.5	4 (0+0+0+4)	74
Gheorghe Pop	Men's sprint	28:04.4	5 (2+3)	86
Gheorghe Pop	Men's individual	54:40.1	3 (2+0+1+0)	69
Cornel Puchianu	Men's sprint	25:52.7	1 (1+0)	60
Cornel Puchianu	Men's pursuit	39:37.6	5 (1+1+2+1)	58
Cornel Puchianu	Men's individual	53:12.1	4 (0+2+0+2)	55
Marius Ungureanu	Men's sprint	28:59.1	4 (2+2)	87
George Buta; Remus Faur; Gheorghe Pop; Cornel Puchianu	Men's relay	1:22:51.1	10 (1+9)	14
Éva Tófalvi	Women's sprint	25:20.0	4 (2+2)	81
Éva Tófalvi	Women's individual	52:13.7	7 (1+2+4+0)	84

== Bobsleigh ==
Based on their rankings in the 2017–18 Bobsleigh World Cup, Romania has qualified 2 sleds.

Athlete	Event	Run 1		Run 2		Run 3		Run 4		Total	
Athlete	Event	Time	Rank	Time	Rank	Time	Rank	Time	Rank	Time	Rank
Mihai Cristian Tentea*; Nicolae Ciprian Daroczi	Two-man	49.69	14	49.72	17	49.93	25	49.64	12	3:18:98	18
Dorin Alexandru Grigore*; Florin Cezar Crăciun; Levente Bartha; Paul Septimiu Muntean	Four-man	50.55	29	50.79	29	50.81	29	Eliminated		2:32.15	29
Maria Constantin*; Andreea Grecu	Two-woman	51.17	12	51.40	15	51.39	14	51.57	19	3:25.53	16

* – Denotes the driver of each sled

== Cross-country skiing ==
Romania qualified three athletes, two male and one female.

Distance

Athlete	Event	Classical		Freestyle		Total		
Athlete	Event	Time	Rank	Time	Rank	Time	Deficit	Rank
Alin Florin Cioancă	Men's 15 km freestyle	—N/a				36:31.9	+2:48.0	43
Paul Constantin Pepene	Men's 15 km freestyle	—N/a				36:19.1	+2:35.2	37
Paul Constantin Pepene	Men's 30 km skiathlon	41:16.2	30	36:37.8	28	1:18:20.4	+2:00.4	24
Paul Constantin Pepene	Men's 50 km classical	—N/a				2:18:44.0	+10:21.9	32
Tímea Sára	Women's 10 km freestyle	—N/a				28:40.9	+3:40.4	53

Sprint

Athlete	Event	Qualification		Quarterfinal		Semifinal		Final	
Athlete	Event	Time	Rank	Time	Rank	Time	Rank	Time	Rank
Alin Florin Cioancă	Men's sprint	3:22.22	47	Did not advance					
Alin Florin Cioancă; Paul Constantin Pepene	Men's team sprint	—N/a				16:52.38	9	Did not advance	
Tímea Sára	Women's sprint	3:48.84	61	Did not advance					

== Luge ==
Based on the results from the World Cups during the 2017–18 Luge World Cup season, Romania qualified 4 sleds.

Athlete	Event	Run 1		Run 2		Run 3		Run 4		Total	
Athlete	Event	Time	Rank	Time	Rank	Time	Rank	Time	Rank	Time	Rank
Valentin Crețu	Men's singles	49.030	28	49.085	33	48.424	26	Eliminated		2:26.539	29
Andrei Turea	Men's singles	49.482	32	48.489	26	49.314	35	Eliminated		2:27.285	31
Cosmin Atodiresei; Ștefan Musei	Men's doubles	47.101	18	47.171	19	—N/a				1:34.272	19
Raluca Strămăturaru	Women's singles	46.469	8	46.532	12	46.606	9	46.681	6	3:06.288	7

Mixed team relay

Athlete	Event	Run 1		Run 2		Run 3		Total	
Athlete	Event	Time	Rank	Time	Rank	Time	Rank	Time	Rank
Raluca Strămăturaru; Valentin Crețu; Cosmin Atodiresei; Ștefan Musei	Team relay	47.097	3	49.609	11	50.138	11	2:26.844	10

== Skeleton ==
Romania qualified two sleds, one in the male disciplined in one in the female discipline. Both athletes and also previously represented Romania in the Olympic Games.

Athlete	Event	Run 1		Run 2		Run 3		Run 4		Total	
Athlete	Event	Time	Rank	Time	Rank	Time	Rank	Time	Rank	Time	Rank
Dorin Dumitru Velicu	Men's	51.91	25	51.51	23	52.02	27	Eliminated		2:35.44	25
Maria Marinela Mazilu	Women's	53.31	18	53.47	19	53.48	18	53.66	19	3:33.92	18

== Ski jumping ==
Athlete	Event	First round			Final			Total	
Athlete	Event	Distance	Points	Rank	Distance	Points	Rank	Points	Rank
Daniela Haralambie	Women's normal hill	80.5	66.5	27 Q	85.0	84.3	20	150.8	25

== Speed skating ==
Athlete	Event	Final	
Athlete	Event	Time	Rank
Alexandra Ianculescu	Women's 500 m	40.70	31
