= Anton Sinapov =

Bulgarian biathlete (born 1993)

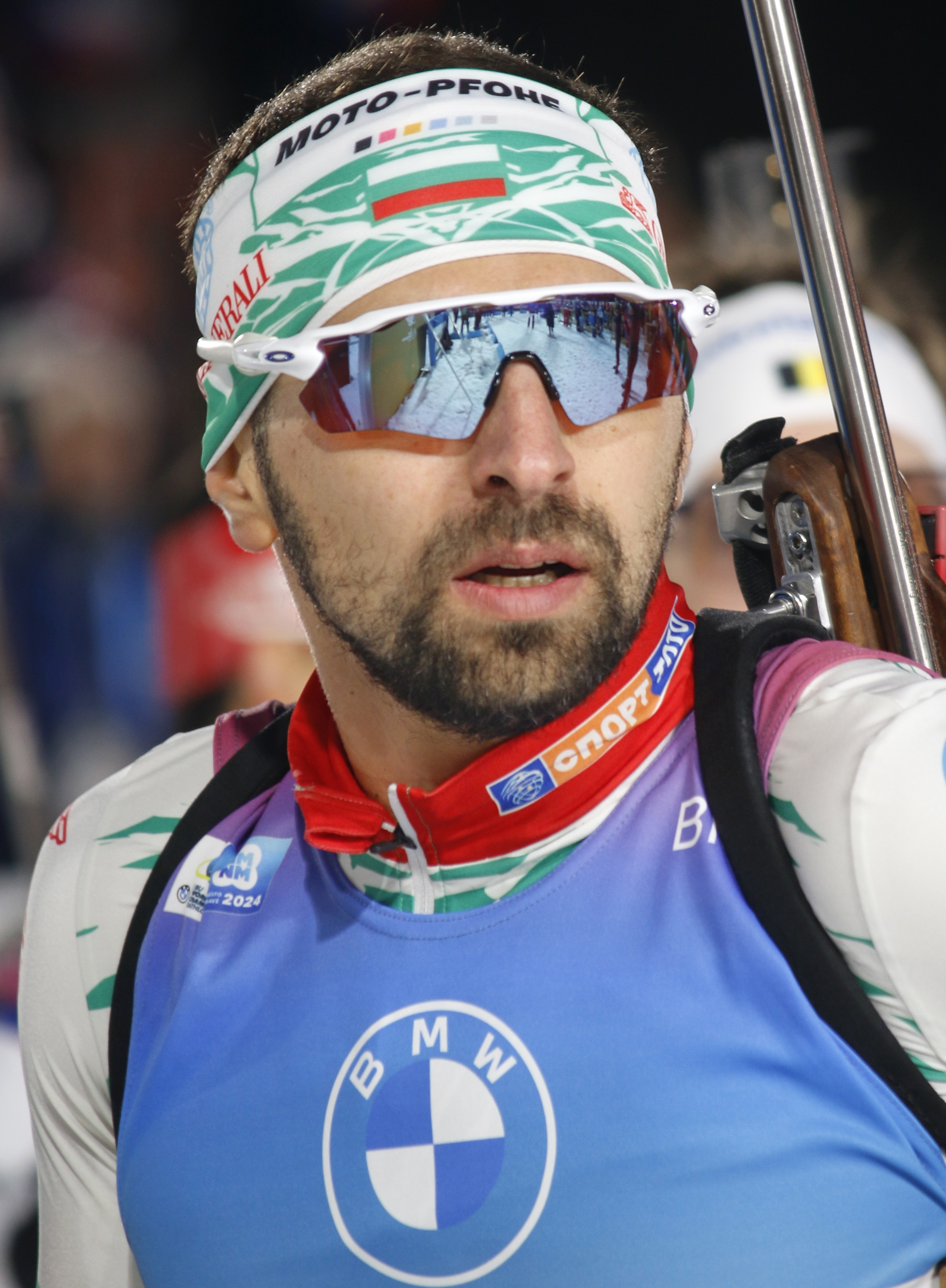
- Sinapov in 2024

Personal information
- Nationality: Bulgarian
- Born: 1 September 1993 (age 33) Smolyan, Bulgaria

Sport
- Sport: Biathlon

Anton Sinapov (Bulgarian: Антон Синапов, born 1 September 1993) is a former Bulgarian biathlete, who started his career as a cross-country skier.

== Career ==
Sinapov participated at the 2011 Nordic World Ski Championships, where he finished 87th in the sprint.

Sinapov competed at the Biathlon World Championships in 2015, 2016 and 2017. His best individual result was the 11th place in the sprint in 2017 and the best relay results were the two 8th places, achieved in 2016/17 and 2017/18 seasons. In 2016/17 he had his highest overall result in the World Cup with a 70th place at the end of the season.

He competed in the 2018 Winter Olympics and finished 56th in the sprint, 60th in the pursuit, 71st in the individual and was part of the lapped relay.

== Biathlon results ==
All results are sourced from the International Biathlon Union.

=== Olympic Games ===
0 medals

Event	Individual	Sprint	Pursuit	Mass start	Relay	Mixed relay
(South Korea) 2018 Pyeongchang	71st	56th	60th	—	16th	—
(China) 2022 Beijing	85th	56th	55th	—	18th	—
(Italy) 2026 Milano Cortina	69th	82nd	—	—	12th	—

=== World Championships ===
0 medals

Event	Individual	Sprint	Pursuit	Mass start	Relay	Mixed relay	Single Mixed relay
(Austria) 2017 Hochfilzen	39th	11th	DNF	—	9th	—	—
(Sweden) 2019 Östersund	DNF	72nd	—	—	9th	—	19th
(Italy) 2020 Rasen-Antholz	69th	79th	—	—	11th	—	25th
(Slovenia) 2021 Pokljuka	58th	70th	—	—	16th	—	—
(Germany) 2023 Oberhof	29th	79th	—	—	—	—	20th
(Czech Republic) 2024 Nové Město na Moravě	77th	76th	—	—	18th	—	—

*During Olympic seasons competitions are only held for those events not included in the Olympic program.
**The single mixed relay was added as an event in 2019.
