= Alin Florin Cioancă =

Romanian cross-country skier

Personal information
- Nationality: Romanian
- Born: 1 April 1995 (age 29)

Sport
- Sport: Cross-country skiing

Alin Florin Cioancă (born 1 April 1995) is a Romanian cross-country skier. He competed in the 2018 Winter Olympics.
