= Estonia at the 2018 Winter Olympics =

Sporting event delegation

- Flag of Estonia
- IOC code: EST
- NOC: Estonian Olympic Committee
- Website: www.eok.ee/en

in Pyeongchang, South Korea 9–25 February 2018
- Competitors: 22 (17 men and 5 women) in 6 sports
- Flag bearer: Saskia Alusalu
- Medals: Gold 0 Silver 0 Bronze 0 Total 0

Winter Olympics appearances (overview)
- 1928; 1932; 1936; 1948–1988; 1992; 1994; 1998; 2002; 2006; 2010; 2014; 2018; 2022; 2026

Other related appearances
- Soviet Union (1956–1988)

Estonia competed at the 2018 Winter Olympics in PyeongChang, South Korea from 9 to 25 February 2018.

Estonian 15-year old freestyle-skier Kelly Sildaru, the gold medal favorite for the women's ski slopestyle, missed the games due to an injury.

== Competitors ==
The following is the list of number of competitors participating at the Games per sport/discipline.

Sport	Men	Women	Total
Alpine skiing	1	1	2
Biathlon	5	1	6
Cross-country skiing	5	2	7
Nordic combined	2	—N/a	2
Ski jumping	3	0	3
Speed skating	1	1	2
Total	17	5	22

== Alpine skiing ==
Based on the quota allocation of International Ski Federation, Estonia qualified 2 athletes.

Athlete	Event	Run 1		Run 2		Total	
Athlete	Event	Time	Rank	Time	Rank	Time	Rank
Anna Lotta Jõgeva	Women's giant slalom	DNF					
Anna Lotta Jõgeva	Women's slalom	1:00.90	52	59.61	49	2:00.51	48
Tormis Laine	Men's giant slalom	1:15.70	50	1:15.18	39	2:30.88	40
Tormis Laine	Men's slalom	DNF					

== Biathlon ==
Based on their Nations Cup ranking in the 2016–17 Biathlon World Cup, Estonia has qualified 5 men and one woman on a quota for previously unqualified nations based on 2017–18 Biathlon World Cup standings. Johan Talihärm was selected as a reserve.

Athlete	Event	Time	Misses	Rank
Kalev Ermits	Men's sprint	25:07.2	2 (2+0)	36
Kalev Ermits	Men's pursuit	37:43.0	6 (1+3+0+2)	41
Kalev Ermits	Men's individual	51:43.6	2 (1+0+1+0)	32
Kauri Kõiv	Men's sprint	26:23.3	3 (2+1)	76
Kauri Kõiv	Men's individual	54:36.4	3 (0+0+0+3)	68
Roland Lessing	Men's sprint	25:19.7	2 (1+1)	41
Roland Lessing	Men's pursuit	38:54.4	7 (2+1+3+1)	53
Roland Lessing	Men's individual	54:46.0	4 (0+1+2+1)	70
Johanna Talihärm	Women's sprint	22:27.0	1 (0+1)	22
Johanna Talihärm	Women's pursuit	33:34.7	4 (0+1+2+1)	26
Johanna Talihärm	Women's individual	46:44.0	3 (1+2+0+0)	50
Rene Zahkna	Men's sprint	26:19.9	3 (1+2)	75
Rene Zahkna	Men's individual	54:20.1	4 (1+1+1+1)	65
Rene Zahkna; Kalev Ermits; Roland Lessing; Kauri Kõiv	Men's team relay	1:22:26.4	18 (3+15)	13

== Cross-country skiing ==
Estonia qualified 5 men and 2 women. Anette Veerpalu fell ill with a virus and was unable to compete.

Distance

Athlete	Event	Classical		Freestyle		Final		
Athlete	Event	Time	Rank	Time	Rank	Time	Deficit	Rank
Algo Kärp	Men's 50 km classical	—N/a				2:13:45.7	+5:23.3	17
Tatjana Mannima	Women's 10 km freestyle	—N/a				28:37.0	+3:36.5	50
Tatjana Mannima	Women's 15 km skiathlon	24:29.4	58	21:37.1	53	46:41.7	+5:56.8	56
Tatjana Mannima	Women's 30 km classical	—N/a				1:34:27.7	+12:10.1	28
Raido Ränkel	Men's 15 km freestyle	—N/a				37:21.9	+3:38.0	59
Karel Tammjärv	Men's 15 km freestyle	—N/a				35:29.4	+1:45.5	22
Karel Tammjärv	Men's 30 km skiathlon	41:56.6	35	36:52.4	31	1:19:25.2	+3:05.2	32
Andreas Veerpalu	Men's 15 km freestyle	—N/a				37:16.2	+3:32.3	58
Andreas Veerpalu	Men's 30 km skiathlon	43:03.9	47	38:33.6	47	1:22:11.4	+5:51.4	47
Andreas Veerpalu	Men's 50 km classical	—N/a				2:21:13.2	+12:51.1	38
Andreas Veerpalu; Algo Kärp; Karel Tammjärv; Raido Ränkel	Men's 4×10 km relay	—N/a				1:38:21.7	+5:16.8	12

Sprint

Athlete	Event	Qualification		Quarterfinal		Semifinal		Final	
Athlete	Event	Time	Rank	Time	Rank	Time	Rank	Time	Rank
Marko Kilp	Men's sprint	3:15.05	15 Q	3.12.00	4	Did not advance			18
Tatjana Mannima	Women's sprint	3:28.57	39	Did not advance					
Raido Ränkel	Men's sprint	3:17.88	31	Did not advance					
Karel Tammjärv	Men's sprint	3:22.68	52	Did not advance					
Marko Kilp; Karel Tammjärv	Men's team sprint	—N/a				16:30.30	9	DNA	17

== Nordic combined ==
Based on the results of the 2016–17 and 2017–18 FIS Nordic Combined World Cup up to 21 January 2017, Estonia qualified two athletes.

Athlete	Event	Ski jumping			Cross-country		Total	
Athlete	Event	Distance	Points	Rank	Time	Rank	Time	Rank
Kristjan Ilves	Normal hill/10 km	104.0	112.8	9	25:52.3	38	27:03.3	16
Kristjan Ilves	Large hill/10 km	123.5	114.0	16	25:28.3	40	27:08.3	28
Karl-August Tiirmaa	Normal hill/10 km	87.0	68.9	43	25:58.2	41	30:05.2	43
Karl-August Tiirmaa	Large hill/10 km	116.0	89.3	34	26:44.0	47	30:02.0	45

== Ski jumping ==
Based on FIS Ski Jumping World Cup standings and Continental Cup Standings from seasons 2016/17 and 2017/18, Estonia qualified 3 male ski jumpers.

Athlete	Event	Qualification			First round			Final			Total	
Athlete	Event	Distance	Points	Rank	Distance	Points	Rank	Distance	Points	Rank	Points	Rank
Artti Aigro	Men's normal hill	81.5	80.0	55	Did not advance							
Artti Aigro	Men's large hill	121.5	86.8	39 Q	107.0	79.4	48	Did not advance				
Kevin Maltsev	Men's normal hill	79.0	74.2	56	Did not advance							
Kevin Maltsev	Men's large hill	DSQ			Did not advance							
Martti Nõmme	Men's normal hill	87.0	88.2	48 Q	84.0	73.8	47	Did not advance				
Martti Nõmme	Men's large hill	114.0	77.2	44 Q	118.0	96.5	43	Did not advance				

== Speed skating ==
Estonia earned the following quotas at the conclusion of the four World Cup's used for qualification. The Estonian team consisted of one male and one female speed skater. This was the first games where an Estonian female speed skater competed.

Individual

Athlete	Event	Final	
Athlete	Event	Time	Rank
Marten Liiv	Men's 1000 m	1:09.75	18
Marten Liiv	Men's 1500 m	1:50.23	33

Mass start

Athlete	Event	Semifinal			Final		
Athlete	Event	Points	Time	Rank	Points	Time	Rank
Saskia Alusalu	Women's mass start	3	8:35.59	7 Q	15	8:47.46	4
