= Belarus at the 2018 Winter Olympics =

- Flag of Belarus, the Red and Green Flag (Чырвона зялёны сцяг)
- IOC code: BLR
- NOC: Belarus Olympic Committee
- Website: www.noc.by/en

in Pyeongchang, South Korea 9–25 February 2018
- Competitors: 33 (16 men and 17 women) in 6 sports
- Flag bearer: Alla Tsuper
- Medals Ranked 15th: Gold 2 Silver 1 Bronze 0 Total 3

Winter Olympics appearances (overview)
- 1994; 1998; 2002; 2006; 2010; 2014; 2018; 2022; 2026

Other related appearances
- Poland (1924–1936); Soviet Union (1952–1988); Unified Team (1992); Individual Neutral Athletes (2026)

Belarus competed at the 2018 Winter Olympics in Pyeongchang, South Korea, from 9 to 25 February 2018, with 33 competitors in 6 sports. They won three medals in total, two gold and one silver, ranking 15th in the medal table.

== Medalists ==
Medal	Name	Sport	Event	Date
Gold	Hanna Huskova	Freestyle skiing	Women's aerials	16 February
Gold	Nadezhda Skardino; Iryna Kryuko; Dzinara Alimbekava; Darya Domracheva	Biathlon	Women's relay	22 February
Silver	Darya Domracheva	Biathlon	Women's mass start	17 February

== Competitors ==
The following is the list of number of competitors participating at the Games per sport/discipline.

Sport	Men	Women	Total
Alpine skiing	1	1	2
Biathlon	5	5	10
Cross-country skiing	4	5	9
Freestyle skiing	3	3	6
Short track speed skating	1	0	1
Speed skating	2	3	5
Total	16	17	33

== Alpine skiing ==
Belarus has qualified one male and one female skier:

Athlete	Event	Run 1		Run 2		Total	
Athlete	Event	Time	Rank	Time	Rank	Time	Rank
Yuri Danilochkin	Men's downhill	—N/a				1:45.86	44
Yuri Danilochkin	Men's super-G	—N/a				1:30.13	42
Yuri Danilochkin	Men's combined	1:22.78	48	55.94	35	2:18.72	34
Yuri Danilochkin	Men's giant slalom	1:19.45	64	1:17.44	53	2:36.89	54
Yuri Danilochkin	Men's slalom	55.42	41	56.73	32	1:52.15	33
Maria Shkanova	Women's super-G	—N/a				DNS	
Maria Shkanova	Women's giant slalom	1:18.17	45	1:14.16	35	2:32.33	38
Maria Shkanova	Women's slalom	52.50	30	51.71	27	1:44.21	28

== Biathlon ==
Based on their Nations Cup rankings in the 2016–17 Biathlon World Cup, Belarus has qualified a team of 5 men and 5 women.

Men

Athlete	Event	Time	Misses	Rank
Sergey Bocharnikov	Sprint	25:20.9	2 (1+1)	42
Sergey Bocharnikov	Pursuit	37:15.6	6 (1+3+0+2)	37
Sergey Bocharnikov	Individual	50:25.3	1 (0+0+0+1)	18
Vladimir Chepelin	Sprint	25:04.8	2 (1+1)	34
Vladimir Chepelin	Pursuit	37:04.6	6 (0+0+3+3)	36
Vladimir Chepelin	Individual	51:27.9	3 (1+0+1+1)	30
Anton Smolski	Sprint	25:05.9	1 (1+0)	35
Anton Smolski	Pursuit	36:44.1	3 (1+1+1+0)	33
Maksim Varabei	Individual	52:01.3	3 (0+2+0+1)	39
Raman Yaliotnau	Sprint	26:12.6	6 (2+4)	71
Raman Yaliotnau	Individual	52:57.6	5 (1+2+1+1)	52
Sergey Bocharnikov; Vladimir Chepelin; Anton Smolski; Raman Yaliotnau	Team relay	1:20:06.0	15 (8+7)	8

Women

Athlete	Event	Time	Misses	Rank
Dzinara Alimbekava	Individual	47:04.0	4 (1+1+1+1)	56
Darya Domracheva	Sprint	21:52.4	2 (1+1)	9
Darya Domracheva	Pursuit	34:26.8	6 (0+1+1+4)	37
Darya Domracheva	Individual	44:57.8	4 (0+0+1+3)	27
Darya Domracheva	Mass start	35:41.8	1 (0+0+1+0)	2nd place, silver medalist(s)
Iryna Kryuko	Sprint	22:17.4	1 (0+1)	17
Iryna Kryuko	Pursuit	32:54.0	2 (1+0+0+1)	17
Iryna Kryuko	Individual	45:26.0	3 (0+2+0+1)	36
Iryna Kryuko	Mass start	39:04.0	4 (3+1+0+0)	26
Nadzeya Pisareva	Sprint	23:29.1	2 (0+2)	52
Nadzeya Pisareva	Pursuit	35:10.3	3 (2+0+0+1)	44
Nadezhda Skardino	Sprint	23:07.8	3 (2+1)	36
Nadezhda Skardino	Pursuit	32:42.7	1 (0+0+1+0)	14
Nadezhda Skardino	Individual	43:40.2	1 (0+0+0+1)	10
Nadezhda Skardino	Mass start	36:10.9	0 (0+0+0+0)	7
Dzinara Alimbekava; Darya Domracheva; Iryna Kryuko; Nadezhda Skardino	Team relay	1:12:03.4	9 (3+6)	1st place, gold medalist(s)

Mixed

Athlete	Event	Time	Misses	Rank
Sergey Bocharnikov; Vladimir Chepelin; Darya Domracheva; Nadezhda Skardino	Team relay	1:09:29.8	3 (2+1)	5

== Cross-country skiing ==
Belarus has qualified four male and five female skiers:

Distance
Men

Athlete	Event	Classical		Freestyle		Total		
Athlete	Event	Time	Rank	Time	Rank	Time	Deficit	Rank
Yury Astapenka	15 km freestyle	—N/a				37:04.0	+3:20.1	55
Yury Astapenka	30 km skiathlon	44:35.3	54	38:37.2	49	1:23:12.5	+6:52.5	50
Sergei Dolidovich	30 km skiathlon	DNF						
Michail Semenov	15 km freestyle	—N/a				36:25.8	+2:41.9	40
Michail Semenov	30 km skiathlon	43:44.1	48	37:27.9	37	1:21:12.0	+4:52.0	44
Michail Semenov	50 km classical	—N/a				2:22:51.2	+14:29.1	44
Aliaksandr Voranau	15 km freestyle	—N/a				38:05.5	+4:21.6	73

Women

Athlete	Event	Classical		Freestyle		Total		
Athlete	Event	Time	Rank	Time	Rank	Time	Deficit	Rank
Valiantsina Kaminskaya	10 km freestyle	—N/a				30:01.6	+5:01.1	70
Valiantsina Kaminskaya	30 km classical	—N/a				1:42:27.6	+20:10.0	45
Polina Seronosova	10 km freestyle	—N/a				28:22.8	+3:22.3	48
Polina Seronosova	15 km skiathlon	23:09.8	37	21:53.8	57	45:34.9	+4:50.0	46
Polina Seronosova	30 km classical	—N/a				1:39:36.0	+17:18.4	40
Yulia Tikhonova	10 km freestyle	—N/a				28:07.0	+3:06.5	40
Yulia Tikhonova	15 km skiathlon	23:29.6	40	20:54.2	37	44:57.1	+4:12.2	42
Yulia Tikhonova	30 km classical	—N/a				DNF		
Valiantsina Kaminskaya; Anastasia Kirillova; Polina Seronosova; Yulia Tikhonova	4×5 km relay	—N/a				57:56.1	+6:31.8	14

Sprint

Athlete	Event	Qualification		Quarterfinals		Semifinals		Final	
Athlete	Event	Time	Rank	Time	Rank	Time	Rank	Time	Rank
Aliaksandr Voranau	Men's sprint	3:17.12	27 Q	3:14.95	5	Did not advance			
Yury Astapenka; Michail Semenov	Men's team sprint	—N/a				16:32.31	7	Did not advance	
Valiantsina Kaminskaya	Women's sprint	3:32.80	47	Did not advance					
Anastasia Kirillova	Women's sprint	3:28.98	40	Did not advance					
Polina Seronosova	Women's sprint	3:29.44	41	Did not advance					
Yulia Tikhonova	Women's sprint	3:27.19	35	Did not advance					
Polina Seronosova; Yulia Tikhonova	Women's team sprint	—N/a				17:33.63	8	Did not advance	

Qualification legend: Q – Qualify on position in heat; q – Qualify on time in round

== Freestyle skiing ==
Belarus has qualified three male and three female skiers:

Aerials

Athlete	Event	Qualification				Final					
Athlete	Event	Jump 1		Jump 2		Jump 1		Jump 2		Jump 3	
Athlete	Event	Points	Rank	Points	Rank	Points	Rank	Points	Rank	Points	Rank
Maxim Gustik	Men's aerials	92.92	18	89.14	16	Did not advance					
Stanislau Hladchenko	Men's aerials	126.11	4 QF	Bye		123.01	5 Q	126.70	3 Q	92.61	6
Anton Kushnir	Men's aerials	120.80	11	121.27	7	Did not advance					
Hanna Huskova	Women's aerials	100.45	2 QF	Bye		94.15	1	85.05	4	96.14	1st place, gold medalist(s)
Aliaksandra Ramanouskaya	Women's aerials	38.85	24	83.65	8	Did not advance					
Alla Tsuper	Women's aerials	77.90	15	99.37	1 Q	90.82	3	84.00	5	59.94	4

== Short track speed skating ==
Belarus has qualified one skater for men's 1500 m events for the Olympics during the four World Cup events in November 2017.

Athlete	Event	Heat		Semifinal		Final	
Athlete	Event	Time	Rank	Time	Rank	Time	Rank
Maksim Siarheyeu	Men's 1500 m	2:15.242	5	Did not advance			

== Speed skating ==
Belarus earned the following quotas at the conclusion of the four World Cup's used for qualification.

Individual

Athlete	Event	Race	
Athlete	Event	Time	Rank
Ignat Golovatsiuk	Men's 500 m	35.23	22
Ignat Golovatsiuk	Men's 1000 m	1:10.140	28
Kseniya Sadouskaya	Women's 500 m	39.64	30
Maryna Zuyeva	Women's 1500 m	DSQ	
Maryna Zuyeva	Women's 3000 m	4:05.96	11
Maryna Zuyeva	Women's 5000 m	7:04.41	7

Mass start

Athlete	Event	Semifinal			Final		
Athlete	Event	Points	Time	Rank	Points	Time	Rank
Vitali Mikhailau	Men's mass start	20	7:55.25	3 Q	1	7:53.38	7
Tatsiana Mikhailava	Women's mass start	0	8:33.93	11	Did not advance		
Maryna Zuyeva	Women's mass start	0	8:54.38	8 Q	3	8:41.73	6
