= Peppe Femling =

Swedish biathlete (born 1992)

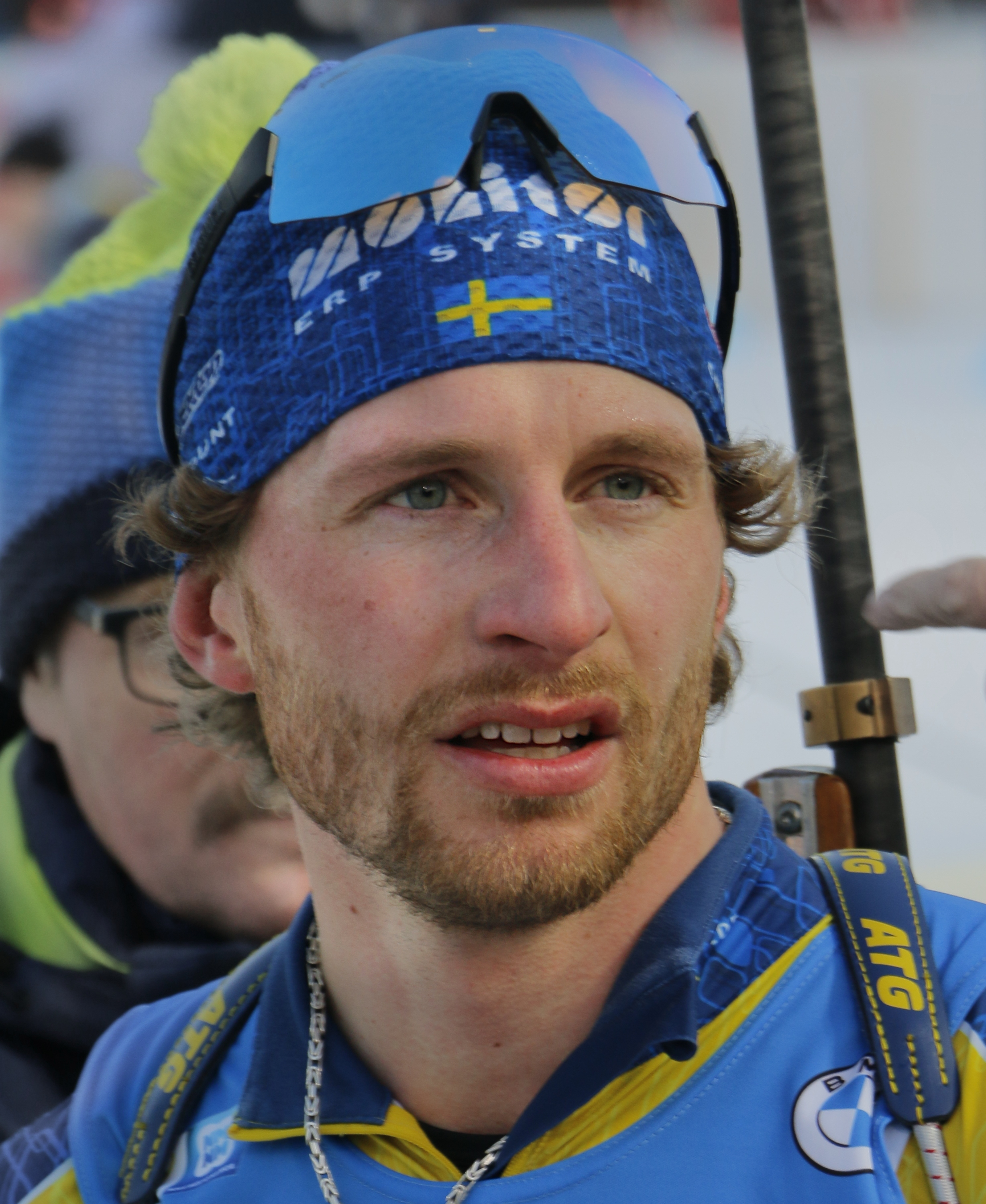
- Peppe Femling in 2023

Personal information
- Nationality: Swedish
- Born: 24 March 1992 (age 34) Gävle, Sweden
- Height: 1.82 m (6 ft 0 in)
- Weight: 75 kg (165 lb)

Sport

Professional information
- Sport: Biathlon
- Club: Piteå skidskytteklubb
- World Cup debut: 2016

Olympic Games
- Teams: 2 (2018, 2022)
- Medals: 1 (1 gold)

World Championships
- Teams: 6 (2015, 2016, 2019–2023)
- Medals: 2 (0 gold)

World Cup
- Seasons: 6 (2014/15–2023/2024)
- Individual victories: 0
- All victories: 3
- Individual podiums: 1
- All podiums: 6
- Overall titles: 0
- Discipline titles: 0
Medal record
Men's biathlon
Representing Sweden
International biathlon competitions
Event	1st	2nd	3rd
Olympic Games	1	0	0
World Championships	0	1	1
Total	1	1	1
Olympic Games
Gold medal – first place	2018 Pyeongchang	4 × 7.5 km relay
World Championships
Silver medal – second place	2021 Pokljuka	4 × 7.5 km relay
Bronze medal – third place	2023 Oberhof	4 × 7.5 km relay

Hans Wilhelm Peppe Femling (born 24 March 1992) is a Swedish former biathlete. He competed in the Biathlon World Cup and represented Sweden at the Biathlon World Championships 2016. He won an Olympic gold medal as part of the Swedish men's relay team in PyeongChang 2018.

== Personal life ==
Peppe Femling is in a relationship with his teammate Anna Magnusson.

== Biathlon results ==
All results are sourced from the International Biathlon Union.

=== Olympic Games ===
1 medal (1 gold)

Event	Individual	Sprint	Pursuit	Mass start	Relay	Mixed relay
(South Korea) 2018 Pyeongchang	—	32nd	42nd	—	Gold	—
(China) 2022 Beijing	40th	64th	—	—	5th	—

=== World Championships ===
2 medals (1 silver, 1 bronze)

Event	Individual	Sprint	Pursuit	Mass start	Relay	Mixed relay	Single mixed relay
(Finland) 2015 Kontiolahti	62nd	78th	—	—	18th	16th	—N/a
(Norway) 2016 Oslo	37th	—	—	—	7th	—	—N/a
(Sweden) 2019 Östersund	67th	86th	—	—	—	—	—
(Italy) 2020 Antholz	17th	20th	16th	22nd	10th	—	—
(Slovenia) 2021 Pokljuka	15th	30th	36th	26th	Silver	—	—
(Germany) 2023 Oberhof	79th	27th	25th	30th	Bronze	—	—
(Czech Republic) 2024 Nové Město na Moravě	64th	—	—	—	—	—	—

*During Olympic seasons competitions are only held for those events not included in the Olympic program.
**The single mixed relay was added as an event in 2019.

=== World Cup ===
Season	Age	Overall		Individual		Sprint		Pursuit		Mass start	
Season	Age	Points	Position	Points	Position	Points	Position	Points	Position	Points	Position
2014–15	22	20	75th	20	42nd	—	—	—	—	—	—
2015–16	23	4	102nd	4	62nd	—	—	—	—	—	—
2016–17	24	14	83rd	14	48th	—	—	—	—	—	—
2017–18	25	Did not score any points in the World Cup this season									
2018–19	26	33	67th	32	33rd	—	—	1	81st	—	—
2019–20	27	109	46th	24	36th	36	53rd	31	38th	18	42nd
2020–21	28	140	39th	26	38th	70	35th	34	43rd	10	46th
