= Mitja Drinovec =

Slovenian biathlete (born 1996)

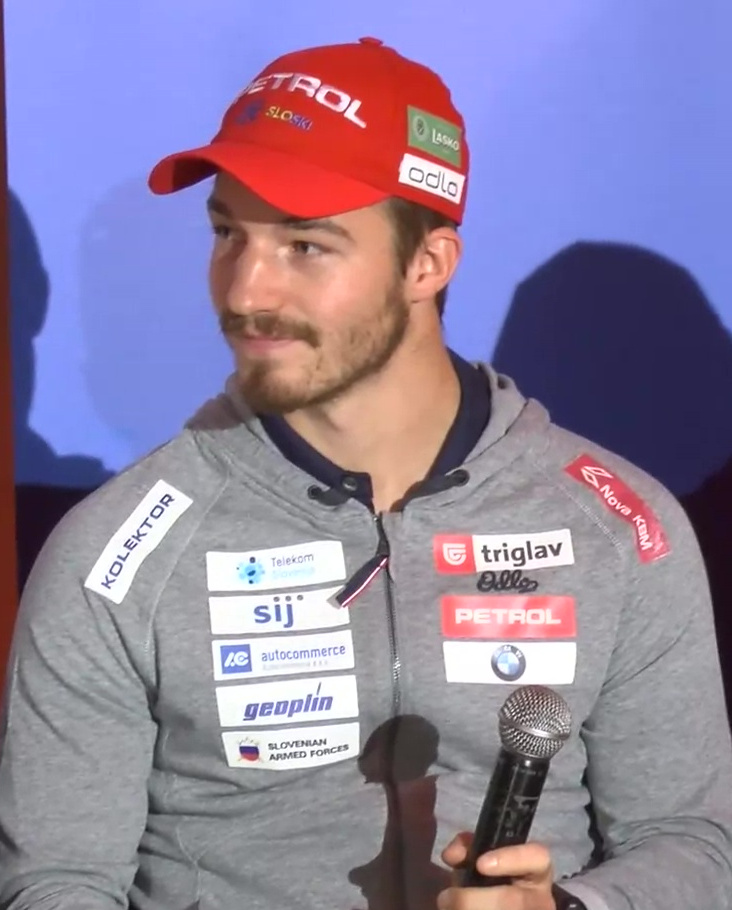
- Drinovec in 2016

Personal information
- Nationality: Slovenian
- Born: 22 February 1996 (age 29)

Sport
- Sport: Biathlon

Mitja Drinovec (born 22 February 1996) is a Slovenian biathlete. He competed in the 2018 Winter Olympics.

== Biathlon results ==
All results are sourced from the International Biathlon Union.

=== Olympic Games ===
0 medals

Event	Individual	Sprint	Pursuit	Mass start	Relay	Mixed relay
(South Korea) 2018 Pyeongchang	80th	72nd	—	—	10th	—

=== World Championships ===
0 medals

Event	Individual	Sprint	Pursuit	Mass start	Relay	Mixed relay	Single mixed relay
(Sweden) 2019 Östersund	—	85th	—	—	—	—	26th
