= Ukraine at the 2018 Winter Olympics =

- Flag of Ukraine
- IOC code: UKR
- NOC: National Olympic Committee of Ukraine
- Website: www.noc-ukr.org/en

in Pyeongchang, South Korea 9–25 February 2018
- Competitors: 33 (17 men and 16 women) in 9 sports
- Flag bearers: Olena Pidhrushna (opening); Oleksandr Abramenko (closing)
- Medals Ranked 21st: Gold 1 Silver 0 Bronze 0 Total 1

Winter Olympics appearances (overview)
- 1994; 1998; 2002; 2006; 2010; 2014; 2018; 2022; 2026

Other related appearances
- Czechoslovakia (1924–1936); Poland (1924–1936); Romania (1924–1936); Soviet Union (1956–1988); Unified Team (1992)

Ukraine competed at the 2018 Winter Olympics in Pyeongchang, South Korea, from 9 to 25 February 2018, with 33 competitors in 9 sports. Oleksandr Abramenko won the only medal for the country, a gold in men's aerials freestyle skiing, earning Ukraine the 21st place in the overall medal table.

== Medalists ==
Medal	Name	Sport	Event	Date
Gold	Oleksandr Abramenko	Freestyle skiing	Men's aerials	18 February

== Competitors ==
The following is the list of number of competitors participating at the Games per sport/discipline.

Sport	Men	Women	Total
Alpine skiing	1	1	2
Biathlon	5	6	11
Cross-country	2	2	4
Figure skating	2	2	4
Freestyle skiing	1	2	3
Luge	4	2	6
Nordic combined	1	0	1
Skeleton	1	0	1
Snowboarding	0	1	1
Total	17	16	33

== Alpine skiing ==
Ukraine has qualified at least one male and one female athlete for alpine skiing.

Athlete	Event	Run 1		Run 2		Total	
Athlete	Event	Time	Rank	Time	Rank	Time	Rank
Ivan Kovbasnyuk	Men's combined	1:24.21	57	DNF			
Ivan Kovbasnyuk	Men's downhill	—N/a				1:48.57	49
Ivan Kovbasnyuk	Men's giant slalom	1:20.41	70	1:17.26	51	2:37.67	57
Ivan Kovbasnyuk	Men's slalom	DNF					
Ivan Kovbasnyuk	Men's super-G	—N/a				DNF	
Olha Knysh	Women's giant slalom	1:20.51	53	DNF			
Olha Knysh	Women's slalom	59.07	50	58.93	46	1:58.00	45
Olha Knysh	Women's super-G	—N/a				1:30.60	43

== Biathlon ==
Based on their Nations Cup rankings in the 2016–17 Biathlon World Cup, Ukraine has qualified a team of 5 men and 6 women. Olena Pidhrushna was selected for the team, but did not take part in the races.

Men

Athlete	Event	Time	Misses	Rank
Dmytro Pidruchnyi	Sprint	24:27.5	0 (0+0)	21
Dmytro Pidruchnyi	Pursuit	36:53.2	4 (1+0+2+1)	34
Artem Pryma	Sprint	25:14.9	2 (1+1)	40
Artem Pryma	Pursuit	37:16.3	6 (1+1+2+2)	38
Artem Pryma	Individual	52:36.5	4 (1+2+0+1)	46
Serhiy Semenov	Sprint	25:24.9	1 (0+1)	46
Serhiy Semenov	Pursuit	38:23.7	5 (1+0+2+2)	49
Serhiy Semenov	Individual	52:57.9	3 (1+0+1+1)	53
Vladimir Semakov	Sprint	26:31.7	3 (1+2)	78
Vladimir Semakov	Individual	51:32.1	1 (0+1+0+0)	31
Artem Tyshchenko	Individual	51:15.2	0 (0+0+0+0)	29
Dmytro Pidruchnyi; Artem Pryma; Vladimir Semakov; Serhiy Semenov	Team relay	1:20:17.3	11 (0+11)	9

Women

Athlete	Event	Time	Misses	Rank
Yuliia Dzhima	Individual	44:33.9	2 (1+0+1+0)	20
Anastasiya Merkushyna	Sprint	23:32.3	3 (2+1)	55
Anastasiya Merkushyna	Pursuit	35:30.4	5 (0+2+2+1)	46
Anastasiya Merkushyna	Individual	48:42.0	6 (1+1+3+1)	70
Valentyna Semerenko	Sprint	23:20.9	3 (2+1)	46
Valentyna Semerenko	Pursuit	DNS		
Valentyna Semerenko	Individual	44:53.9	1 (0+0+0+1)	25
Valentyna Semerenko	Mass start	37:39.9	1 (1+0+0+0)	19
Vita Semerenko	Sprint	22:00.7	1 (0+1)	14
Vita Semerenko	Pursuit	32:54.4	4 (2+1+1+0)	18
Vita Semerenko	Individual	48:03.8	5 (0+3+1+1)	63
Vita Semerenko	Mass start	38:25.3	3 (0+0+3+0)	24
Iryna Varvynets	Sprint	24:48.1	5 (1+4)	73
Iryna Varvynets; Vita Semerenko; Yuliia Dzhima; Anastasiya Merkushyna	Team relay	1:13:44.8	10 (2+10)	11

Mixed

Athlete	Event	Time	Misses	Rank
Iryna Varvynets; Yuliia Dzhima; Dmytro Pidruchnyi; Artem Pryma	Team relay	1:09:46.4	5 (0+5)	7

== Cross-country skiing ==
Four skiers will represent Ukraine in cross-country skiing.

Distance

Athlete	Event	Classical		Freestyle		Total		
Athlete	Event	Time	Rank	Time	Rank	Time	Deficit	Rank
Oleksii Krasovskyi	Men's 15 km freestyle	—N/a				39:05.3	+5:21.4	84
Oleksii Krasovskyi	Men's 30 km skiathlon	44:36.7	59	LAP				
Oleksii Krasovskyi	Men's 50 km classical	—N/a				2:25:36.4	+17:14.3	50
Andrii Orlyk	Men's 15 km freestyle	—N/a				39:11.3	+5:27.4	86
Maryna Antsybor	Women's 10 km freestyle	—N/a				28:18.7	+3:18.2	46
Maryna Antsybor	Women's 15 km skiathlon	24:09.3	55	21:36.5	52	46:18.2	+5:33.3	53
Tetyana Antypenko	Women's 10 km freestyle	—N/a				28:38.2	+3:37.7	52
Tetyana Antypenko	Women's 15 km skiathlon	23:32.3	45	21:24.0	49	45:31.2	+4:46.3	45
Tetyana Antypenko	Women's 30 km classical	—N/a				1:38:17.3	+15:59.7	38

Sprint

Athlete	Event	Qualification		Quarterfinal		Semifinal		Final	
Athlete	Event	Time	Rank	Time	Rank	Time	Rank	Time	Rank
Oleksii Krasovskyi	Men's sprint	3:33.40	70	Did not advance					
Andrii Orlyk	Men's sprint	3:39.18	79	Did not advance					
Oleksii Krasovskyi; Andrii Orlyk	Men's team sprint	—N/a				17:32.50	10	Did not advance	
Maryna Antsybor	Women's sprint	3:40.17	56	Did not advance					
Tetyana Antypenko	Women's sprint	3:38.56	54	Did not advance					
Maryna Antsybor; Tetyana Antypenko	Women's team sprint	—N/a				17:44.04	10	Did not advance	

== Figure skating ==
Ukraine qualified an ice dancing team, based on its placement at the 2017 World Figure Skating Championships in Helsinki, Finland. They additionally qualified one male and one female figure skater through the 2017 CS Nebelhorn Trophy. The team was announced on 19 December 2017.

Athlete	Event	SP / SD		FS / FD		Total	
Athlete	Event	Points	Rank	Points	Rank	Points	Rank
Yaroslav Paniot	Men's singles	46.58	30	Did not advance			
Anna Khnychenkova	Ladies' singles	47.59	29	Did not advance			
Oleksandra Nazarova / Maxim Nikitin	Ice dancing	57.97	21	Did not advance			

== Freestyle skiing ==
Three skiers will represent Ukraine in freestyle skiing.

Aerials

Athlete	Event	Qualification				Final					
Athlete	Event	Jump 1		Jump 2		Jump 1		Jump 2		Jump 3	
Athlete	Event	Points	Rank	Points	Rank	Points	Rank	Points	Rank	Points	Rank
Oleksandr Abramenko	Men's aerials	123.01	9	123.08	4 Q	125.67	3 Q	125.79	4 Q	128.51	1st place, gold medalist(s)
Olga Polyuk	Women's aerials	82.21	10	55.50	17	Did not advance					

Moguls

Athlete	Event	Qualification								Final											
Athlete	Event	Run 1				Run 2				Run 1				Run 2				Run 3			
Athlete	Event	Time	Points	Total	Rank	Time	Points	Total	Rank	Time	Points	Total	Rank	Time	Points	Total	Rank	Time	Points	Total	Rank
Tetiana Petrova	Women's moguls	36.69	39.54	46.19	29	37.62	17.46	23.07	20	Did not advance											

== Luge ==
Based on the results from the World during the 2017–18 Luge World Cup season, Ukraine qualified 5 sleds.

Athlete	Event	Run 1		Run 2		Run 3		Run 4		Total	
Athlete	Event	Time	Rank	Time	Rank	Time	Rank	Time	Rank	Time	Rank
Anton Dukach	Men's singles	48.888	27	48.307	21	48.303	24	Eliminated		2:25.498	23
Andriy Mandziy	Men's singles	1:02.935	40	48.473	25	47.981	19	Eliminated		2:39.389	40
Oleksandr Obolonchyk; Roman Zakharkiv	Men's doubles	48.316	20	47.401	20	—N/a				1:35.717	20
Olena Shkhumova	Women's singles	46.950	19	46.844	19	47.751	26	Eliminated		2:21.545	21
Olena Stetskiv	Women's singles	50.599	30	48.303	29	47.929	28	Eliminated		2:26.831	28

Mixed team relay

Athlete	Event	Run 1		Run 2		Run 3		Total	
Athlete	Event	Time	Rank	Time	Rank	Time	Rank	Time	Rank
Olena Shkhumova; Anton Dukach; Oleksandr Obolonchyk; Roman Zakharkiv	Team relay	51.503	13	49.135	9	50.365	13	2:31.003	13

== Nordic combined ==
One skier will represent Ukraine in Nordic combined.

Athlete	Event	Ski jumping			Cross-country		Total	
Athlete	Event	Distance	Points	Rank	Time	Rank	Time	Rank
Viktor Pasichnyk	Normal hill/10 km	89.5	84.0	36	24:40.1	13	27:46.1	30
Viktor Pasichnyk	Large hill/10 km	126.0	108.2	21	24:36.6	33	26:39.6	23

== Skeleton ==
Ukraine qualified 1 sled, making its Olympic debut in the sport of skeleton.

Athlete	Event	Run 1		Run 2		Run 3		Run 4		Total	
Athlete	Event	Time	Rank	Time	Rank	Time	Rank	Time	Rank	Time	Rank
Vladyslav Heraskevych	Men's	51.26	14	51.16	15	51.21	17	50.85	7	3:24.47	12

== Snowboarding ==
One athlete will represent Ukraine in snowboarding.

Parallel

Athlete	Event	Qualification		Round of 16	Quarterfinal	Semifinal	Final	
Athlete	Event	Time	Rank	Opposition Time	Opposition Time	Opposition Time	Opposition Time	Rank
Annamari Dancha	Women's giant slalom	1:46.64	28	Did not advance				
