= Biathlon at the 2018 Winter Olympics =

Biathlon at the XXIII Olympic Winter Games
- Biathlon pictogram at the 2018 Winter Olympics
- Venue: Alpensia Biathlon Centre
- Dates: 9–23 February
- No. of events: 11 (5 men, 5 women, 1 mixed)
- Competitors: 219 from 28 nations

Biathlon at the 2018 Winter Olympics was held at the Alpensia Biathlon Centre, Daegwallyeong-myeon, Pyeongchang-gun, Gangwon-do, South Korea. There were eleven events contested: men and women competed in each of sprint, pursuit, individual, mass start, and relay; there was also a mixed relay event. The eleven events were scheduled to take place between 9 and 23 February 2018.

== Qualification ==
A total of 230 quota spots were available to athletes to compete at the games (115 men and 115 women). Countries were assigned quotas using a combination of the Nation Cup scores of their top three athletes in the individual, sprint, and relay competitions, during the 2016–17 Biathlon World Cup season. The final twelve quota spots were available the following season.

== Competition schedule ==
The following was the competition schedule for all eleven events.

Notes

- Women's 15 km individual was postponed due to high winds from 14 February to 15 February.

All times are (UTC+9).

| Date | Time | Event |
|---|---|---|
| 10 February | 20:15 | Women's 7.5 km sprint |
| 11 February | 20:15 | Men's 10 km sprint |
| 12 February | 19:10 | Women's 10 km pursuit |
| 12 February | 21:00 | Men's 12.5 km pursuit |
| 15 February | 17:15 | Women's 15 km individual |
| 15 February | 20:20 | Men's 20 km individual |
| 17 February | 20:15 | Women's 12.5 km mass start |
| 18 February | 20:15 | Men's 15 km mass start |
| 20 February | 20:15 | Mixed 2 x 6 km / 2 x 7.5 km relay |
| 22 February | 20:15 | Women's 4 x 6 km relay |
| 23 February | 20:15 | Men's 4 x 7.5 km relay |

== Medal summary ==
=== Medal table ===
| Rank | Nation | Gold | Silver | Bronze | Total |
|---|---|---|---|---|---|
| 1 | Germany | 3 | 1 | 3 | 7 |
| 2 | France | 3 | 0 | 2 | 5 |
| 3 | Sweden | 2 | 2 | 0 | 4 |
| 4 | Norway | 1 | 3 | 2 | 6 |
| 5 | Slovakia | 1 | 2 | 0 | 3 |
| 6 | Belarus | 1 | 1 | 0 | 2 |
| 7 | Czech Republic | 0 | 1 | 1 | 2 |
| 8 | Slovenia | 0 | 1 | 0 | 1 |
| 9 | Italy | 0 | 0 | 2 | 2 |
| 10 | Austria | 0 | 0 | 1 | 1 |
| Totals (10 entries) | | 11 | 11 | 11 | 33 |

=== Men's events ===
| Event | Gold | | Silver | | Bronze | |
|---|---|---|---|---|---|---|
| Individual | Johannes Thingnes Bø; Norway | 48:03.8 | Jakov Fak; Slovenia | 48:09.3 | Dominik Landertinger; Austria | 48:18.0 |
| Sprint | Arnd Peiffer; Germany | 23:38.8 | Michal Krčmář; Czech Republic | 23:43.2 | Dominik Windisch; Italy | 23:46.5 |
| Pursuit | Martin Fourcade; France | 32:51.7 | Sebastian Samuelsson; Sweden | 33:03.7 | Benedikt Doll; Germany | 33:06.8 |
| Mass start | Martin Fourcade; France | 35:47.3 | Simon Schempp; Germany | 35:47.3 | Emil Hegle Svendsen; Norway | 35:58.5 |
| Relay | Sweden; Peppe Femling; Jesper Nelin; Sebastian Samuelsson; Fredrik Lindström | 1:15:16.5 | Norway; Lars Helge Birkeland; Tarjei Bø; Johannes Thingnes Bø; Emil Hegle Svendsen | 1:16:12.0 | Germany; Erik Lesser; Benedikt Doll; Arnd Peiffer; Simon Schempp | 1:17:23.6 |

=== Women's events ===
| Event | Gold | | Silver | | Bronze | |
|---|---|---|---|---|---|---|
| Individual | Hanna Öberg; Sweden | 41:07.2 | Anastasiya Kuzmina; Slovakia | 41:31.9 | Laura Dahlmeier; Germany | 41:48.4 |
| Sprint | Laura Dahlmeier; Germany | 21:06.2 | Marte Olsbu Røiseland; Norway | 21:30.4 | Veronika Vítková; Czech Republic | 21:32.0 |
| Pursuit | Laura Dahlmeier; Germany | 30:35.3 | Anastasiya Kuzmina; Slovakia | 31:04.7 | Anaïs Bescond; France | 31:04.9 |
| Mass start | Anastasiya Kuzmina; Slovakia | 35:23.0 | Darya Domracheva; Belarus | 35:41.8 | Tiril Eckhoff; Norway | 35:50.7 |
| Relay | Belarus; Nadezhda Skardino; Iryna Kryuko; Dzinara Alimbekava; Darya Domracheva | 1:12.03.4 | Sweden; Linn Persson; Mona Brorsson; Anna Magnusson; Hanna Öberg | 1:12.14.1 | France; Anaïs Chevalier; Marie Dorin Habert; Justine Braisaz; Anaïs Bescond | 1:12.21.0 |

=== Mixed event ===
| Event | Gold | | Silver | | Bronze | |
|---|---|---|---|---|---|---|
| Relay | France; Marie Dorin Habert; Anaïs Bescond; Simon Desthieux; Martin Fourcade | 1:08.34.3 | Norway; Marte Olsbu; Tiril Eckhoff; Johannes Thingnes Bø; Emil Hegle Svendsen | 1:08.55.2 | Italy; Lisa Vittozzi; Dorothea Wierer; Lukas Hofer; Dominik Windisch | 1:09.01.2 |

== Participating nations ==
A total of 219 athletes from 28 nations (including the IOC's designation of Olympic Athletes from Russia) were scheduled to participate (the numbers of athletes are shown in parentheses).

- Austria (9)
- Belarus (10)
- Belgium (2)
- Bulgaria (10)
- Canada (10)
- China (2)
- Czech Republic (11)
- Estonia (6)
- Finland (8)
- France (12)
- Germany (12)
- Great Britain (1)
- Italy (11)
- Japan (6)
- Kazakhstan (10)
- Latvia (3)
- Lithuania (4)
- Norway (11)
- Olympic Athletes from Russia (4)
- Poland (7)
- Romania (6)
- Slovakia (10)
- Slovenia (7)
- South Korea (6)
- Sweden (10)
- Switzerland (10)
- Ukraine (11)
- United States (10)
