= Gheorghe Pop =

Romanian biathlete

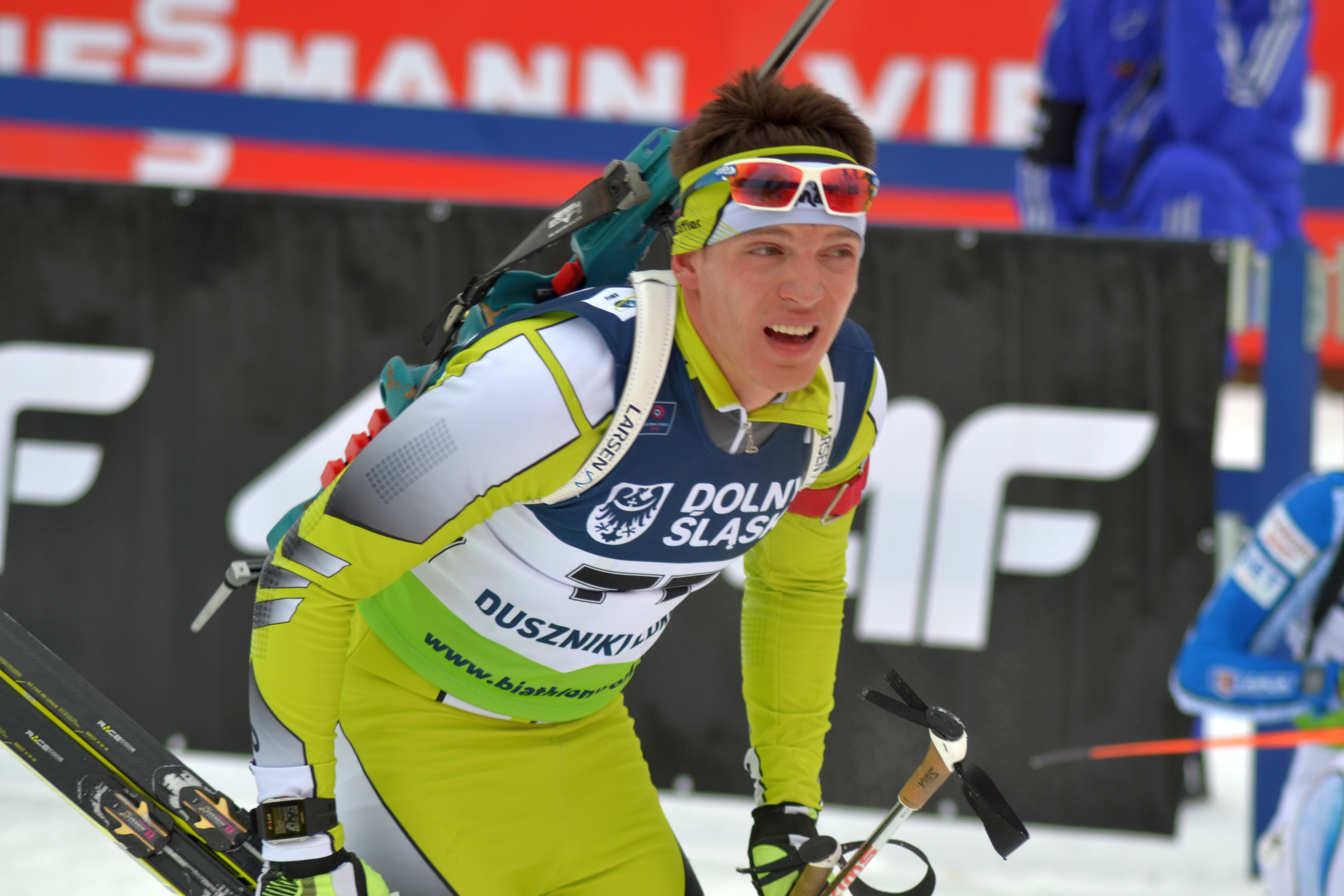
- Pop at the European Biathlon Championships 2017

Personal information
- Nationality: Romanian
- Born: 11 September 1993 (age 31)

Sport
- Sport: Biathlon

Gheorghe Pop (born 11 September 1993) is a Romanian biathlete. He competed in the 2018 Winter Olympics.

== Biathlon results ==
All results are sourced from the International Biathlon Union.

=== Olympic Games ===
0 medals

Event	Individual	Sprint	Pursuit	Mass start	Relay	Mixed relay
(South Korea) 2018 Pyeongchang	69th	86th	—	—	14th	—

=== World Championships ===
0 medals

Event	Individual	Sprint	Pursuit	Mass start	Relay	Mixed relay
(Austria) 2017 Hochfilzen	71st	—	—	—	17th	—
