= Leif Nordgren =

American biathlete

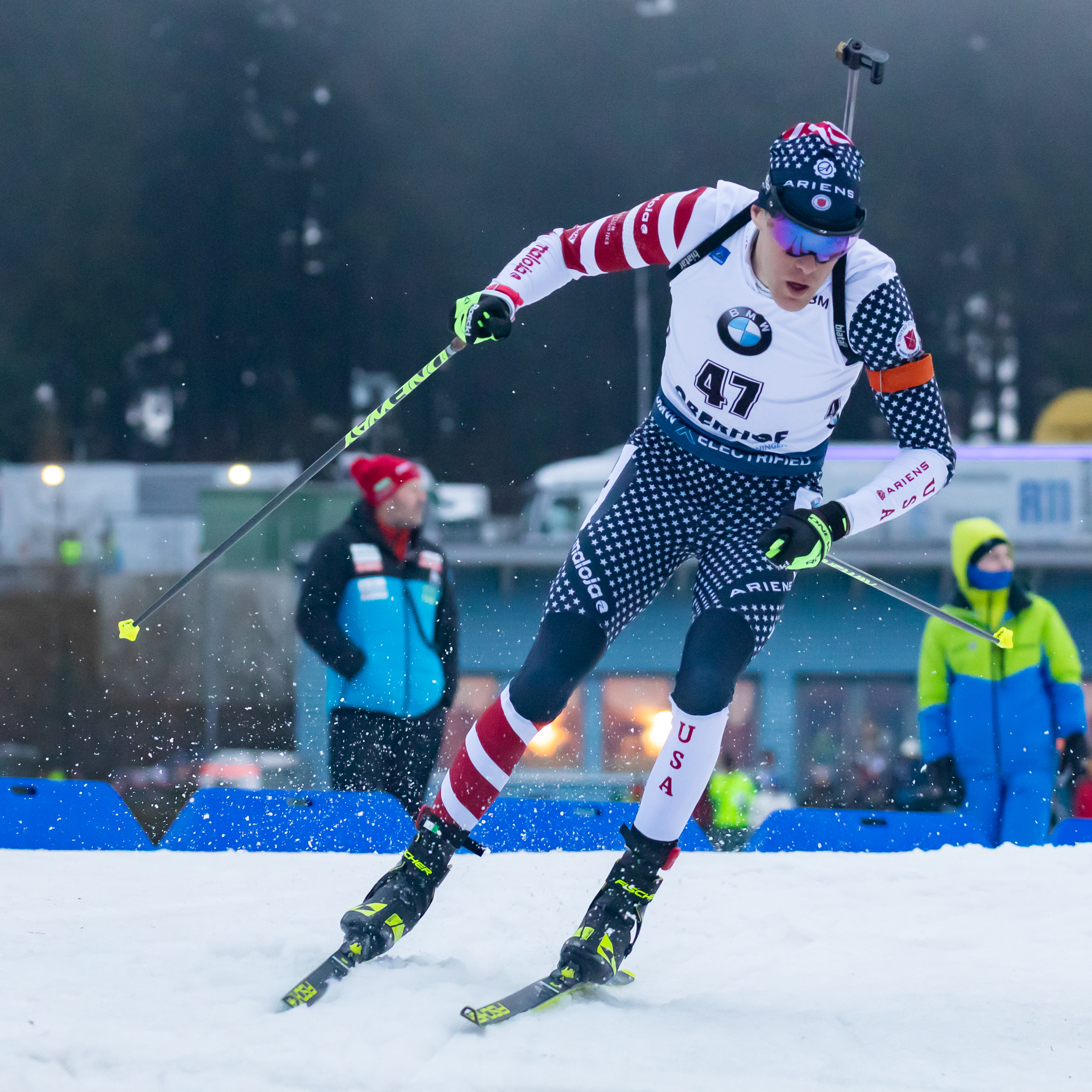
- Nordgren in 2020

Personal information
- Born: May 18, 1989 (age 37) Colorado Springs, Colorado, United States
- Height: 6 ft 2 in (188 cm)
- Weight: 175 lb (79 kg)

Sport
- Country: United States
- Sport: Biathlon
Medal record
Representing United States
Youth World Championships
Bronze medal – third place	2008 Ruhpolding	10 km pursuit

Leif Nordgren (born May 18, 1989 in Colorado Springs, Colorado) is an American biathlete.

Living in Minnesota and introduced to biathlon by his elder sister Sonne at age 14, he started competing seriously at age 17. He placed in the top ten in all events in the 2008 Junior World Championships, obtaining a bronze medal in 10 km pursuit. He has competed in the World Championships 2011–2019, with the best results in relays (6 in 2011). His best individual result in the World Championship is 17 in mass start in 2011.

Nordgren competed at the 2014 Winter Olympics in Sochi. and the 2018 Winter Olympics in Pyeongchang. He represented the United States at the 2022 Winter Olympics.

He is a 2007 Forest Lake Area High School graduate. He is a Warrant Officer in the Vermont Army National Guard.

== Biathlon results ==
All results are sourced from the International Biathlon Union.

=== Olympic Games ===
0 medals

Event	Individual	Sprint	Pursuit	Mass start	Relay	Mixed relay
(Russia) 2014 Sochi	82nd	44th	53rd	—	16th	—
(South Korea) 2018 Pyeongchang	66th	58th	50th	—	6th	—
(China) 2022 Beijing	87th	83rd	—	—	13th	—

=== World Championships ===
0 medals

Event	Individual	Sprint	Pursuit	Mass start	Relay	Mixed relay	Single Mixed relay
(Russia) 2011 Khanty-Mansiysk	21st	26th	38th	17th	6th	13th	—N/a
(Germany) 2012 Ruhpolding	81st	—	—	—	10th	—	—N/a
(Czech Republic) 2013 Nové Město	22nd	52nd	43rd	—	12th	8th	—N/a
(Finland) 2015 Kontiolahti	33rd	45th	51st	—	14th	8th	—N/a
(Norway) 2016 Oslo Holmenkollen	27th	18th	52nd	dnf	8th	—	—N/a
(Austria) 2017 Hochfilzen	23rd	26th	49th	—	7th	—	—N/a
(Slovenia) 2021 Pokljuka	31st	45th	32nd	—	15th	—	—

*During Olympic seasons, competitions are only held for those events not included in the Olympic program.
