= Remus Faur =

Romanian biathlete (born 1989)

Personal information
- Nationality: Romanian
- Born: 6 June 1989 (age 35)

Sport
- Sport: Biathlon

Remus Faur (born 6 June 1989) is a Romanian biathlete. He competed in the 2018 Winter Olympics.

== Biathlon results ==
All results are sourced from the International Biathlon Union.

=== Olympic Games ===
0 medals

| Event | Individual | Sprint | Pursuit | Mass start | Relay | Mixed relay |
|---|---|---|---|---|---|---|
| (South Korea) 2018 Pyeongchang | 74th | 68th | — | — | 14th | — |

=== World Championships ===
0 medals

| Event | Individual | Sprint | Pursuit | Mass start | Relay | Mixed relay |
|---|---|---|---|---|---|---|
| (Czech Republic) 2013 Nové Město | 91st | 76th | — | — | 18th | — |
| (Finland) 2015 Kontiolahti | 72nd | 94th | — | — | 22nd | — |
| (Norway) 2016 Oslo | — | 81st | — | — | 18th | — |
| (Austria) 2017 Hochfilzen | 78th | 23rd | 42nd | — | 17th | 20th |

*During Olympic seasons competitions are only held for those events not included in the Olympic program.
