= Biathlon World Championships 2015 – Men's sprint =

Men's sprint at the Biathlon World Championships 2015
- Venue: Kontiolahti, Finland
- Date: 7 March 2015
- Competitors: 129 from 37 nations
- Winning time: 24:12.8

Medalists
gold medal	Johannes Thingnes Bø	Norway
silver medal	Nathan Smith	Canada
bronze medal	Tarjei Bø	Norway

The Men's sprint event of the Biathlon World Championships 2015 was held on 7 March 2015 at 14:00 local time.

== Results ==
Rank	Bib	Name	Nationality	Time	Penalties (P+S)	Deficit
1st place, gold medalist(s)	16	Johannes Thingnes Bø	Norway	24:12.8	1 (0+1)	—
2nd place, silver medalist(s)	12	Nathan Smith	Canada	24:24.9	1 (0+1)	+12.1
3rd place, bronze medalist(s)	38	Tarjei Bø	Norway	24:38.1	0 (0+0)	+25.3
4	41	Simon Fourcade	France	24:42.3	1 (0+1)	+29.5
5	36	Erik Lesser	Germany	24:43.1	1 (0+1)	+30.3
6	11	Evgeniy Garanichev	Russia	24:48.4	2 (0+2)	+35.6
7	10	Michal Šlesingr	Czech Republic	24:48.9	2 (1+1)	+36.1
8	4	Vladimir Iliev	Bulgaria	24:53.0	1 (1+0)	+40.2
9	23	Ondřej Moravec	Czech Republic	24:56.7	1 (0+1)	+43.9
10	39	Benedikt Doll	Germany	24:59.3	2 (0+2)	+46.5
11	43	Jaroslav Soukup	Czech Republic	25:02.4	0 (0+0)	+49.6
12	25	Martin Fourcade	France	25:02.5	3 (0+3)	+49.7
13	7	Benjamin Weger	Switzerland	25:07.7	2 (1+1)	+54.9
14	17	Jakov Fak	Slovenia	25:08.1	3 (1+2)	+55.3
15	5	Tim Burke	United States	25:12.4	2 (1+1)	+59.6
16	21	Yuryi Liadov	Belarus	25:12.5	2 (0+2)	+59.7
17	40	Lowell Bailey	United States	25:14.3	1 (0+1)	+1:01.5
18	28	Anton Shipulin	Russia	25:15.3	2 (1+1)	+1:02.5
19	34	Ole Einar Bjørndalen	Norway	25:21.7	3 (1+2)	+1:08.9
20	26	Fredrik Lindström	Sweden	25:26.0	3 (0+3)	+1:13.2
21	18	Brendan Green	Canada	25:27.1	1 (0+1)	+1:14.3
21	54	Michael Rösch	Belgium	25:27.1	1 (1+0)	+1:14.3
23	14	Dominik Windisch	Italy	25:28.3	2 (1+1)	+1:15.5
24	2	Lukas Hofer	Italy	25:32.1	3 (1+2)	+1:19.3
25	58	Christian De Lorenzi	Italy	25:33.9	1 (0+1)	+1:21.1
26	6	Serhiy Semenov	Ukraine	25:38.2	3 (1+2)	+1:25.4
27	31	Timofey Lapshin	Russia	25:40.9	3 (1+2)	+1:28.1
28	3	Mario Dolder	Switzerland	25:42.3	2 (0+2)	+1:29.5
29	53	Serafin Wiestner	Switzerland	25:43.1	2 (1+1)	+1:30.3
30	27	Arnd Peiffer	Germany	25:44.0	3 (1+2)	+1:31.2
31	57	Roland Lessing	Estonia	25:45.2	2 (2+0)	+1:32.4
32	51	Cornel Puchianu	Romania	25:45.9	2 (1+1)	+1:33.1
33	48	Matej Kazár	Slovakia	25:48.3	1 (0+1)	+1:35.5
34	37	Dmitry Malyshko	Russia	25:48.4	3 (3+0)	+1:35.6
35	59	Henrik L'Abée-Lund	Norway	25:50.7	1 (1+0)	+1:37.9
36	8	Emil Hegle Svendsen	Norway	25:53.3	4 (2+2)	+1:40.5
36	46	Ivan Joller	Switzerland	25:53.3	2 (1+1)	+1:40.5
38	29	Quentin Fillon Maillet	France	25:54.2	2 (0+2)	+1:41.4
39	30	Dominik Landertinger	Austria	25:59.3	2 (1+1)	+1:46.5
39	42	Jean-Guillaume Béatrix	France	25:59.3	3 (0+3)	+1:46.5
41	35	Daniel Mesotitsch	Austria	26:00.5	3 (2+1)	+1:47.7
42	1	Andrejs Rastorgujevs	Latvia	26:00.7	4 (2+2)	+1:47.9
43	9	Vladimir Chepelin	Belarus	26:02.0	3 (2+1)	+1:49.2
44	50	Julian Eberhard	Austria	26:03.9	4 (2+2)	+1:51.1
45	22	Leif Nordgren	United States	26:09.4	3 (0+3)	+1:56.6
46	19	Simon Eder	Austria	26:11.0	4 (2+2)	+1:58.2
47	15	Klemen Bauer	Slovenia	26:13.9	5 (2+3)	+2:01.1
48	56	Oleksander Zhyrnyi	Ukraine	26:17.0	3 (2+1)	+2:04.2
49	24	Dmytro Pidruchnyi	Ukraine	26:18.8	3 (2+1)	+2:06.0
50	55	Scott Gow	Canada	26:19.0	2 (1+1)	+2:06.2
51	70	Jarkko Kauppinen	Finland	26:21.2	1 (0+1)	+2:08.4
52	13	Krasimir Anev	Bulgaria	26:30.4	3 (0+3)	+2:17.6
53	89	Kauri Kõiv	Estonia	26:33.1	3 (1+2)	+2:20.3
54	61	Ahti Toivanen	Finland	26:35.4	2 (1+1)	+2:22.6
55	97	Sean Doherty	United States	26:41.7	3 (2+1)	+2:28.9
56	47	Dmitriy Dyuzhev	Belarus	26:50.5	2 (1+1	+2:37.7
57	64	Ivan Zlatev	Bulgaria	26:57.7	3 (1+2)	+2:44.9
58	120	Krzysztof Pływaczyk	Poland	26:58.0	2 (0+2)	+2:45.2
59	33	Michal Krčmář	Czech Republic	26:59.4	5 (3+2)	+2:46.6
60	88	Tomas Kaukėnas	Lithuania	27:00.6	3 (1+2)	+2:47.8
61	108	George Buta	Romania	27:03.5	2 (0+2)	+2:50.7
62	32	Artem Pryma	Ukraine	27:05.3	4 (1+3)	+2:52.5
63	68	Łukasz Szczurek	Poland	27:07.3	2 (1+1)	+2:54.5
64	52	Kalev Ermits	Estonia	27:10.1	6 (4+2)	+2:57.3
65	62	Martin Otčenáš	Slovakia	27:13.2	4(2+2)	+3:00.4
66	102	Janez Marič	Slovenia	27:13.5	4 (0+4)	+3:00.7
67	44	Tsukasa Kobonoki	Japan	27:18.9	3 (1+2)	+3:06.1
68	80	Karol Dombrovski	Lithuania	27:19.7	2 (0+2)	+3:06.9
69	110	Vytautas Strolia	Lithuania	27:20.3	3 (1+2)	+3:07.5
70	99	Dzmitry Abasheu	Belarus	27:22.1	4 (2+2)	+3:09.3
71	98	Rok Tršan	Slovenia	27:23.3	4 (0+4)	+3:10.5
72	60	Ted Armgren	Sweden	27:23.5	4 (0+4)	+3:10.7
73	109	Christian Gow	Canada	27:23.8	3 (1+2)	+3:11.0
74	111	Miroslav Matiaško	Slovakia	27:28.1	4 (1+3)	+3:15.3
75	92	Tomáš Hasilla	Slovakia	27:28.7	3 (1+2)	+3:15.9
76	128	Anton Sinapov	Bulgaria	27:30.1	3 (2+1)	+3:17.3
77	20	Simon Schempp	Germany	27:32.3	7 (4+3)	+3:19.5
78	49	Peppe Femling	Sweden	27:39.7	6 (3+3)	+3:26.9
79	93	Lee-Steve Jackson	Great Britain	27:44.1	3 (1+2)	+3:31.3
80	105	Mikito Tachizaki	Japan	27:45.4	4 (2+2)	+3:32.6
81	78	Scott Dixon	Great Britain	27:48.6	1 (0+1)	+3:35.8
82	69	Anton Pantov	Kazakhstan	27:52.2	2 (0+2)	+3:39.5
83	74	Christofer Eriksson	Sweden	27:54.6	5 (2+3)	+3:41.8
84	77	Kazuya Inomata	Japan	27:58.0	4 (2+2)	+3:45.2
85	83	Olli Hiidensalo	Finland	28:05.7	6 (2+4)	+3:52.9
86	100	Maxim Braun	Kazakhstan	28:07.2	2 (0+2)	+3:54.4
87	96	Tang Jinle	China	28:22.9	3 (0+3)	+4:10.1
88	73	Ren Long	China	28:37.5	5 (1+4)	+4:24.7
89	90	Grzegorz Guzik	Poland	28:39.3	6 (4+2)	+4:26.5
90	45	Thomas Bormolini	Italy	28:45.8	5 (1+4)	+4:33.0
91	84	Kim Yong-gyu	South Korea	28:46.6	3 (1+2)	+4:33.8
92	104	Alexei Almoukov	Australia	28:47.1	3 (1+2)	+4:34.3
93	94	Roberts Slotiņš	Latvia	28:51.5	4 (1+3)	+4:38.7
94	101	Remus Faur	Romania	28:58.1	5 (2+3)	+4:45.3
95	106	Damir Rastić	Serbia	29:02.0	4 (1+3)	+4:49.2
96	63	Yan Savitskiy	Kazakhstan	29:07.8	6 (2+4)	+4:55.0
97	91	Jun Je-uk	South Korea	29:12.8	4 (2+2)	+5:00.0
98	75	Apostolos Angelis	Greece	29:15.7	4 (2+2)	+5:02.9
99	86	Thorsten Langer	Belgium	29:22.3	1 (1+0)	+5:09.5
100	124	Kim Jong-min	South Korea	29:26.7	3 (2+1)	+5:13.9
101	118	Marian Marcel Dănilă	Romania	29:47.7	7 (3+4)	+5:34.9
102	103	Károly Gombos	Hungary	29:50.2	3 (1+2)	+5:37.4
103	126	Tuomas Grönman	Finland	29:51.8	7 (2+5)	+5:39.0
104	107	Edin Hodžić	Serbia	30:08.7	3 (2+1)	+5:55.9
105	125	Lee Su-young	South Korea	30:13.9	5 (1+4)	+6:01.1
106	127	Toms Praulītis	Latvia	30:14.0	2 (1+1)	+6:01.2
107	85	Filip Petrović	Croatia	30:22.8	3 (0+3)	+6:10.0
108	114	Kevin Kane	Great Britain	30:39.2	6 (3+3)	+6:26.4
109	123	Rokas Suslavičius	Lithuania	30:40.7	4 (3+1)	+6:27.9
110	121	Thierry Langer	Belgium	30:41.9	5 (4+1)	+6:29.1
111	112	Ahmet Üstüntaş	Turkey	30:57.8	3 (1+2)	+6:45.0
112	119	Ryo Maeda	Japan	31:04.4	4 (2+2)	+6:51.6
113	129	Vassiliy Podkorytov	Kazakhstan	31:06.8	6 (1+5)	+6:54.0
114	81	Gjorgji Icoski	Macedonia	31:19.2	3 (0+3)	+7:06.4
115	66	Rolands Pužulis	Latvia	31:23.7	5 (3+2)	+7:10.9
116	116	Dimitrios Kyriazis	Greece	31:25.5	2 (0+2)	+7:12.7
117	95	Kleanthis Karamichas	Czech Republic	31:33.5	4 (3+1)	+7:20.7
118	115	Marcel Laponder	Great Britain	31:49.8	7 (2+5)	+7:37.0
119	82	Tom Lahaye-Goffart	Belgium	32:14.1	7 (4+3)	+8:01.3
120	122	Dejan Krsmanović	Serbia	32:23.3	6 (3+3)	+8:10.5
121	72	Victor Pînzaru	Moldova	32:33.7	2 (1+1)	+8:20.9
122	117	Ajlan Rastić	Serbia	32:42.3	7 (2+5)	+8:29.5
123	87	Dyllan Harmer	Australia	33:12.2	6 (3+3)	+8:59.4
124	71	Orhangazi Civil	Turkey	33:31.2	6 (3+3)	+9:18.4
125	67	Toni Stanoeski	Macedonia	33:41.9	7 (3+4)	+9:29.1
126	65	Mehmet Üstüntaş	Turkey	33:51.7	6 (1+5)	+9:38.9
127	113	Daniel Walker	Australia	34:40.9	7 (3+4)	+10:28.1
	76	Joel Sloof	Netherlands	DNF		
	79	Martin Remmelg	Estonia	DNF		
