= Biathlon World Championships 2015 – Men's relay =

Men's relay at the Biathlon World Championships 2015
- Venue: Kontiolahti, Finland
- Date: 14 March 2015
- Competitors: 108 from 27 nations
- Winning time: 1:13:49.5

Medalists
gold medal	Erik Lesser; Daniel Böhm; Arnd Peiffer; Simon Schempp	Germany
silver medal	Ole Einar Bjørndalen; Tarjei Bø; Johannes Thingnes Bø; Emil Hegle Svendsen	Norway
bronze medal	Simon Fourcade; Jean-Guillaume Béatrix; Quentin Fillon Maillet; Martin Fourcade	France

The Men's relay event of the Biathlon World Championships 2015 was held on 14 March 2015.

== Results ==
The race was started at 17:30 EET.

Rank	Bib	Team	Time	Penalties (P+S)	Deficit
1st place, gold medalist(s)	3	Germany; Erik Lesser; Daniel Böhm; Arnd Peiffer; Simon Schempp	1:13:49.5; 18:33.9; 18:50.8; 18:24.7; 18:00.1	0+0 0+3; 0+0 0+0; 0+0 0+2; 0+0 0+0; 0+0 0+1	
2nd place, silver medalist(s)	2	Norway; Ole Einar Bjørndalen; Tarjei Bø; Johannes Thingnes Bø; Emil Hegle Svendsen	1:14:04.9; 18:27.5; 19:05.3; 18:31.9; 18:00.2	0+0 0+6; 0+0 0+0; 0+0 0+3; 0+0 0+2; 0+0 0+1	+15.4
3rd place, bronze medalist(s)	4	France; Simon Fourcade; Jean-Guillaume Béatrix; Quentin Fillon Maillet; Martin Fourcade	1:14:23.1; 18:28.8; 18:52.8; 19:08.3; 17:53.2	0+3 0+1; 0+0 0+0; 0+1 0+1; 0+1 0+0; 0+1 0+0	+33.6
4	1	Russia; Evgeniy Garanichev; Alexey Volkov; Dmitry Malyshko; Anton Shipulin	1:14:39.2; 19:19.1; 18:52.3; 18:36.8; 17:51.0	1+6 0+0; 1+3 0+0; 0+2 0+0; 0+0 0+0; 0+1 0+0	+49.7
5	5	Austria; Daniel Mesotitsch; Sven Grossegger; Simon Eder; Dominik Landertinger	1:14:44.3; 19:16.8; 18:23.1; 18:54.7; 18:09.7	0+0 1+4; 0+0 1+3; 0+0 0+0; 0+0 0+1; 0+0 0+0	+54.8
6	8	Czech Republic; Michal Krčmář; Jaroslav Soukup; Michal Šlesingr; Ondřej Moravec	1:14:44.6; 18:45.1; 18:54.9; 18:24.8; 18:39.8	0+4 0+2; 0+0 0+0; 0+1 0+0; 0+0 0+2; 0+3 0+0	+55.1
7	11	Switzerland; Mario Dolder; Benjamin Weger; Serafin Wiestner; Ivan Joller	1:15:38.3; 19:09.9; 18:22.4; 18:59.4; 19:06.6	0+1 0+6; 0+0 0+3; 0+0 0+0; 0+0 0+2; 0+1 0+1	+1:48.8
8	9	Slovenia; Janez Marič; Klemen Bauer; Jakov Fak; Rok Tršan	1:15:38.7; 19:21.4; 18:46.9; 18:20.9; 19:09.5	0+4 0+2; 0+0 0+1; 0+2 0+1; 0+0 0+0; 0+2 0+0	+1:49.2
9	7	Ukraine; Dmytro Pidruchnyi; Artem Pryma; Oleksander Zhyrnyi; Serhiy Semenov	1:16:21.0; 19:18.6; 18:56.6; 19:20.6; 18:45.2	0+2 0+1; 0+0 0+1; 0+0 0+0; 0+1 0+0; 0+1 0+0	+2:31.5
10	12	Belarus; Vladimir Chepelin; Dmitriy Dyuzhev; Dzmitry Abasheu; Yuryi Liadov	1:16:24.2; 18:57.2; 19:00.6; 19:54.4; 18:32.0	0+6 0+5; 0+3 0+1; 0+2 0+1; 0+1 0+0; 0+0 0+3	+2:34.7
11	14	Slovakia; Tomáš Hasilla; Matej Kazár; Miroslav Matiaško; Martin Otčenáš	1:46:46.5; 19:27.9; 18:45.0; 19:44.2; 18:49.4	0+2 0+6; 0+1 0+1; 0+0 0+1; 0+0 0+2; 0+1 0+2	+2:57.0
12	10	Italy; Christian De Lorenzi; Lukas Hofer; Thomas Bormolini; Dominik Windisch	1:16:52.7; 18:58.8; 18:23.5; 20:42.9; 18:47.5	1+4 0+5; 0+0 0+3; 0+1 0+0; 1+3 0+0; 0+0 0+2	+3:03.2
13	25	Finland; Jarkko Kauppinen; Ahti Toivanen; Olli Hiidensalo; Tuomas Grönman	1:17:18.6; 18:57.8; 19:33.7; 19:09.5; 19:33.6	0+4 0+3; 0+0 0+1; 0+1 0+1; 0+1 0+0; 0+2 0+1	+3:29.1
14	20	United States; Lowell Bailey; Leif Nordgren; Tim Burke; Sean Doherty	1:17:21.1; 18:57.8; 18:58.5; 20:15.1; 19:09.7	0+5 2+6; 0+0 0+2; 0+1 0+1; 0+1 2+3; 0+3 0+0	+3:31.6
15	15	Estonia; Kauri Kõiv; Kalev Ermits; Rene Zahkna; Roland Lessing	1:17:22.0; 19:35.5; 19:05.7; 20:04.1; 18:36.7	0+2 0+5; 0+0 0+1; 0+0 0+2; 0+2 0+1; 0+0 0+1	+3:32.5
16	13	Bulgaria; Krasimir Anev; Ivan Zlatev; Vladimir Iliev; Dimitar Gerdzhikov	1:17:29.5; 18:54.5; 19:30.2; 18:48.1; 20:16.7	1+7 0+5; 0+2 0+0; 0+2 0+1; 0+0 0+2; 1+3 0+3	+3:40.0
17	16	Kazakhstan; Yan Savitskiy; Anton Pantov; Maxim Braun; Vassiliy Podkorytrov	1:17:55.7; 19:08.0; 19:38.9; 19:26.3; 19:42.5	0+0 0+3; 0+0 0+1; 0+0 0+1; 0+0 0+0; 0+0 0+1	+4:06.2
18	17	Sweden; Tobias Arwidson; Peppe Femling; Christofer Eriksson; Ted Armgren	1:18:12.0; 19:19.3; 18:47.1; 20:51.4; 19:14.2	0+3 2+3; 0+2 0+0; 0+1 0+0; 0+0 2+3; 0+0 0+0	+4:22.5
19	6	Canada; Christian Gow; Nathan Smith; Scott Gow; Brendan Green	1:18:52.9; 19:47.5; 18:18.9; 21:31.5; 19:15.0	2+5 0+4; 0+2 0+1; 0+0 0+0; 2+3 0+2; 0+0 0+1	+5:03.4
20	21	Poland; Mateusz Janik; Łukasz Szczurek; Grzegorz Guzik; Krzysztof Pływaczyk	LAP; 20:22.3; 19.39.1; 21:06.8	1+5 0+5; 0+1 0+3; 0+0 0+1; 1+3 0+1; 0+1 0+0	
21	24	Japan; Kazuya Inomata; Tsukasa Kobonoki; Mikito Tachizaki; Ryo Maeda	LAP; 20:10.0; 20:03.9; 20:03.5	0+6 0+9; 0+2 0+3; 0+1 0+2; 0+2 0+1; 0+1 0+3	
22	18	Romania; George Buta; Remus Faur; Marian Marcel Dănilă; Cornel Puchianu	LAP; 19:09.8; 20:04.2; 21:06.8	0+5 4+7; 0+0 0+1; 0+3 0+0; 0+1 1+3; 0+1 3+3	
23	22	Lithuania; Tomas Kaukėnas; Karol Dombrovski; Vytautas Strolia; Rokas Suslavičius	LAP; 19:14.1; 19:41.7; 22:06.2	1+4 1+11; 0+1 0+3; 0+0 0+2; 1+3 1+3; 0+0 0+3	
24	19	Great Britain; Lee-Steve Jackson; Scott Dixon; Kevin Kane; Marcel Laponder	LAP; 19:34.6; 20.47.9; 21:39.8	0+3 0+7; 0+0 0+3; 0+1 0+1; 0+0 0+2; 0+2 0+1	
25	26	South Korea; Jun Je-uk; Kim Jong-min; Kim Yong-gyu; Lee Su-young	LAP; 20:11.7; 20:59.8; 21:47.1	1+8 1+8; 0+2 0+0; 0+1 0+2; 0+2 0+3; 1+3 1+3	
26	23	Latvia; Rolands Pužulis; Toms Praulītis; Roberts Slotiņš; Aleksandrs Patrijuks	LAP; 20:53.3; 22:54.2; 21:12.4	0+5 4+8; 0+0 1+3; 0+1 3+3; 0+2 0+0; 0+2 0+2	
27	27	Serbia; Damir Rastić; Edin Hodžić; Dejan Krsmanović; Ajlan Rastić	LAP; 21:42.3; 21:58.0; 24:20.2	4+10 0+7; 1+3 0+1; 0+1 0+3; 3+3 0+3; 0+3	
