= 2015–16 Biathlon World Cup – Sprint Men =

Baddy 03/03/2000

The 2015–16 Biathlon World Cup – Sprint Men started on Saturday, December 5, 2015 in Östersund and finished in 2016 in Khanty-Mansiysk. Martin Fourcade of France is the defending titlist.

== Competition format ==
The 10 kilometres (6.2 mi) sprint race is the third oldest biathlon event; the distance is skied over three laps. The biathlete shoots two times at any shooting lane, first prone, then standing, totalling 10 targets. For each missed target the biathlete has to complete a penalty lap of around 150 metres. Competitors' starts are staggered, normally by 30 seconds.

== 2014–15 Top 3 Standings ==
Medal	Athlete	Points
Gold:	(France) Martin Fourcade	416
Silver:	(Russia) Anton Shipulin	370
Bronze:	(Germany) Simon Schempp	354

== Medal winners ==
Event:	Gold:	Time	Silver:	Time	Bronze:	Time
Östersund details	Martin Fourcade; France	24:02.0 (1+1)	Arnd Peiffer; Germany	24:53.6 (0+1)	Ole Einar Bjørndalen; Norway	24:57.2 (1+1)
Hochfilzen details	Simon Schempp; Germany	23:52.3 (0+0)	Martin Fourcade; France	24:02.2 (1+0)	Tarjei Bø; Norway	24:11.2 (0+0)
Pokljuka details	Simon Schempp; Germany	23:02.5 (0+0)	Ole Einar Bjørndalen; Norway	23:17.7 (0+0)	Evgeniy Garanichev; Russia	23:27.6 (0+0)
Ruhpolding details	Johannes Thingnes Bø; Norway	21:57.5 (0+0)	Tarjei Bø; Norway	22:00.5 (0+0)	Emil Hegle Svendsen; Norway	22:05.1 (0+0)
Antholz-Anterselva details	Simon Schempp; Germany	23:01.2 (0+0)	Maxim Tsvetkov; Russia	23:07.0 (0+0)	Tarjei Bø; Norway	23:12.0 (0+0)
Canmore details	Martin Fourcade; France	23:51.5 (0+0)	Anton Shipulin; Russia	24:07.2 (0+0)	Simon Schempp; Germany	23:10.2 (0+0)
Presque Isle details	Johannes Thingnes Bø; Norway	24:38.8 (0+0)	Anton Shipulin; Russia	25:06.7 (0+0)	Martin Fourcade; France	25:07.7 (0+1)
World Championships details	Martin Fourcade; France	25:35.4 (0+0)	Ole Einar Bjørndalen; Norway	26:02.3 (0+0)	Serhiy Semenov; Ukraine	26:03.0 (0+0)
Khanty-Mansiysk details	Julian Eberhard; Austria	24:18.6 (0+0)	Simon Schempp; Germany	24:19.7 (0+0)	Arnd Peiffer; Germany	24:41.6 (0+0)

== Standings ==
#	Name	ÖST	HOC	POK	RU1	ANT	CAN	PRE	WCH	KHA	Total
1	Martin Fourcade (FRA)	60	54	40	43	13	60	48	60	1	379
2	Simon Schempp (GER)	0	60	60	DNS	60	48	DNS	34	54	316
3	Johannes Thingnes Bø (NOR)	38	27	0	60	34	—	60	43	36	298
4	Arnd Peiffer (GER)	54	—	0	30	32	30	32	36	48	262
5	Anton Shipulin (RUS)	9	43	38	13	40	54	54	0	0	251
6	Tarjei Bø (NOR)	12	48	32	54	48	—	34	0	6	234
7	Benedikt Doll (GER)	40	34	34	0	30	13	29	8	34	222
8	Julian Eberhard (AUT)	0	36	18	25	19	43	14	5	60	220
9	Simon Eder (AUT)	22	30	—	38	38	38	30	14	3	213
10	Dominik Landertinger (AUT)	0	28	—	36	28	40	—	32	43	207
11	Evgeniy Garanichev (RUS)	14	38	48	1	23	31	—	38	12	205
12	Ole Einar Bjørndalen (NOR)	48	25	54	—	18	—	—	54	0	199
13	Tim Burke (USA)	0	11	27	23	24	18	21	27	38	189
14	Emil Hegle Svendsen (NOR)	36	31	30	48	14	—	—	24	—	183
15	Erik Lesser (GER)	11	0	20	0	7	29	43	22	40	172
16	Serhiy Semenov (UKR)	0	21	0	16	21	28	6	48	27	167
17	Quentin Fillon Maillet (FRA)	43	22	36	10	0	0	8	25	21	165
18	Michal Šlesingr (CZE)	17	0	0	34	4	27	27	26	29	164
19	Andrejs Rastorgujevs (LAT)	0	5	10	27	5	25	36	21	32	161
20	Dominik Windisch (ITA)	0	0	25	0	22	34	7	40	31	159
21	Simon Desthieux (FRA)	20	32	28	20	0	0	0	29	22	151
22	Lowell Bailey (USA)	0	29	26	8	9	17	26	12	10	137
23	Lukas Hofer (ITA)	0	18	24	0	29	23	19	0	24	137
24	Maxim Tsvetkov (RUS)	0	12	29	11	54	21	0	0	0	127
25	Benjamin Weger (SUI)	25	1	21	2	7	0	38	0	30	124
26	Krasimir Anev (BUL)	21	24	13	18	36	—	—	7	0	119
27	Alexey Slepov (RUS)	23	3	43	0	27	0	—	—	18	114
28	Michal Krčmář (CZE)	28	0	2	29	20	4	12	17	2	114
29	Nathan Smith (CAN)	32	23	17	26	0	10	—	0	DNS	108
30	Sven Grosseger (AUT)	30	2	19	40	0	14	2	0	—	107
31	Vladimir Iliev (BUL)	20	0	0	21	12	—	20	31	0	104
32	Oleksander Zhyrnyi (UKR)	—	0	0	19	16	11	10	13	28	97
33	Fredrik Lindström (SWE)	0	26	11	22	—	—	0	11	27	97
34	Matej Kazar (SVK)	18	10	0	0	17	26	23	0	0	94
35	Simon Fourcade (FRA)	0	0	8	12	31	36	3	0	0	90
36	Serafin Wiestner (SUI)	0	0	0	17	1	0	40	30	0	88
37	Jean-Guillaume Béatrix (FRA)	10	14	9	9	43	2	0	—	0	87
38	Andreas Birnbacher (GER)	0	20	15	32	0	—	18	—	—	85
39	Ondřej Moravec (CZE)	1	17	22	28	0	0	DNS	0	16	84
40	Dmytro Pidruchnyi (UKR)	34	15	0	31	0	—	—	0	—	80
41	Sean Doherty (USA)	16	16	0	—	0	—	28	0	20	80
42	Artem Pryma (UKR)	0	0	0	—	9	24	25	19	—	77
43	Alexey Volkov (RUS)	—	—	31	—	0	19	0	—	17	67
44	Vitaliy Kilchytskyy (UKR)	0	—	—	15	15	9	0	—	23	62
45	Vladimir Chepelin (BLR)	0	0	0	6	2	—	5	28	19	60
46	Alexander Os (NOR)	—	—	DNS	0	—	32	24	—	—	56
47	Erlend Bjøntegaard (NOR)	—	—	—	24	0	—	31	0	DNS	55
48	Dmitry Malyshko (RUS)	7	40	3	4	—	0	0	—	0	54
49	Macx Davies (CAN)	31	0	7	0	0	16	—	0	0	54
50	Jakov Fak (SLO)	0	19	5	—	26	—	—	2	—	52
51	Aliaksandr Darozhka (BLR)	—	—	14	—	—	20	—	9	7	50
52	Raman Yaliotnau (BLR)	26	0	12	3	0	—	0	0	5	46
53	Jesper Nelin (SWE)	25	0	—	0	0	—	—	10	9	44
54	Klemen Bauer (SLO)	0	9	23	0	—	0	9	0	—	41
55	Jaroslav Soukup (CZE)	0	0	16	0	11	—	—	0	14	41
56	Christian De Lorenzi (ITA)	0	13	0	0	25	0	0	0	—	38
57	Leif Nordgren (USA)	0	0	0	—	0	15	0	23	—	38
58	Martin Otcenas (SVK)	13	4	0	0	0	—	—	16	0	33
59	Yan Savitskiy (KAZ)	0	0	0	0	0	—	16	1	13	30
60	Henrik L'Abée-Lund (NOR)	29	0	0	—	0	0	—	—	—	29
61	Anton Babikov (RUS)	—	—	—	—	10	—	—	18	—	28
62	Daniel Böhm (GER)	27	0	—	0	—	0	0	—	—	27
63	Vladimir Semakov (UKR)	15	0	0	0	—	—	—	—	11	26
64	Anton Sinapov (BUL)	0	0	0	—	—	—	0	0	25	25
65	Mario Dolder (SUI)	—	—	—	0	0	8	17	0	0	25
66	Tomas Kaukenas (LTU)	4	0	0	—	0	—	—	20	0	24
67	Kalev Ermits (EST)	0	0	0	0	0	0	22	0	—	22
68	Maksim Varabei (BLR)	—	—	—	—	—	22	—	0	—	22
69	Scott Gow (CAN)	0	8	6	0	0	7	—	0	0	21
70	Lars Helge Birkeland (NOR)	0	0	—	15	—	0	4	—	DNS	19
71	Dmitriy Dyuzhev (BLR)	0	0	1	0	0	—	0	—	15	16
72	Cornel Puchianu (ROU)	0	0	0	0	0	0	0	15	0	15
73	Yuryi Liadov (BLR)	0	0	—	—	—	—	15	—	—	15
74	Lorenz Waeger (AUT)	—	—	—	—	—	3	11	—	0	14
75	Alexander Povarnitsyn (RUS)	—	—	—	—	—	—	13	—	—	13
76	Timofey Lapshin (RUS)	6	7	—	—	—	—	—	—	—	13
77	Brendan Green (CAN)	0	6	0	—	0	1	—	6	0	13
78	Dzmitry Abasheu (BLR)	—	—	—	—	—	12	—	—	—	12
79	Christian Gow (CAN)	0	0	4	7	0	0	—	—	—	11
80	Maxim Braun (KAZ)	8	0	0	0	—	0	—	0	0	8
81	Florian Graf (GER)	—	—	—	—	—	—	—	—	8	8
82	Thomas Bormolini (ITA)	0	0	—	0	—	6	0	0	—	6
83	Tomáš Krupčík (CZE)	3	0	—	0	3	0	0	—	—	6
84	Daniel Mesotitsch (AUT)	5	0	—	—	—	—	—	—	—	5
85	Sergey Bocharnikov (BLR)	—	—	—	5	0	—	—	—	—	5
86	Vetle Sjåstad Christiansen (NOR)	—	—	—	—	—	5	—	—	—	5
87	Matthias Bischl (GER)	—	0	—	—	—	—	—	—	4	4
88	Roland Lessing (EST)	—	0	0	—	0	—	—	4	—	4
89	Kauri Kõiv (EST)	0	0	0	0	0	—	—	3	0	3
90	Tomáš Hasilla (SVK)	2	0	0	0	0	—	—	0	0	2
91	Martin Jäger (SUI)	0	0	0	0	0	0	1	0	—	1
