= Biathlon World Championships 2015 – Mixed relay =

Mixed relay at the Biathlon World Championships 2015
- Venue: Kontiolahti, Finland
- Date: 5 March 2015
- Competitors: 104 from 26 nations
- Winning time: 1:20:27.2

Medalists
gold medal	Veronika Vítková; Gabriela Soukalová; Michal Šlesingr; Ondřej Moravec	Czech Republic
silver medal	Anaïs Bescond; Marie Dorin Habert; Jean-Guillaume Béatrix; Martin Fourcade	France
bronze medal	Fanny Welle-Strand Horn; Tiril Eckhoff; Johannes Thingnes Bø; Tarjei Bø	Norway

The Mixed relay event of the Biathlon World Championships 2015 was held on 5 March 2015.

== Results ==
The race was started at 18:15 EET.

Rank	Bib	Team	Time	Penalties (P+S)	Deficit
1st place, gold medalist(s)	6	Czech Republic; Veronika Vítková; Gabriela Soukalová; Michal Šlesingr; Ondřej Moravec	1:20:27.2; 19:50.5; 19:44.8; 20:42.1; 20:09.8	0+3 0+5; 0+2 0+2; 0+0 0+0; 0+0 0+2; 0+1 0+1	
2nd place, silver medalist(s)	2	France; Anaïs Bescond; Marie Dorin Habert; Jean-Guillaume Béatrix; Martin Fourcade	1:20:47.4; 20:35.6; 19:16.2; 21:24.4; 19:31.2	0+1 0+7; 0+1 0+3; 0+0 0+1; 0+0 0+3; 0+0 0+0	+20.2
3rd place, bronze medalist(s)	1	Norway; Fanny Welle-Strand Horn; Tiril Eckhoff; Johannes Thingnes Bø; Tarjei Bø	1:20:54.9; 20:20.3; 20:21.7; 20:08.6; 20:04.3	0+0 1+3; 0+0 0+0; 0+0 1+3; 0+0 0+0; 0+0 0+0	+27.7
4	8	Belarus; Nadezhda Skardino; Darya Domracheva; Vladimir Chepelin; Yuryi Liadov	1:20:58.2; 20:09.0; 18:59.4; 20:56.1; 20.52.5	0+1 0+6; 0+0 0+0; 0+0 0+0; 0+0 0+3; 0+1 0+3	+31.0
5	11	Austria; Lisa Hauser; Katharina Innerhofer; Sven Grossegger; Simon Eder	1:21:27.5; 20.06.3; 20.42.8; 20:42.4; 19.56.0	0+2 0+1; 0+0 0+0; 0+1 0+1; 0+1 0+0; 0+0 0+0	+1:00.3
6	5	Germany; Luise Kummer; Franziska Preuß; Daniel Böhm; Benedikt Doll	1:21:50.0; 21:06.5; 20:04.9; 20.36.7; 20:01.9	0+2 0+4; 0+1 0+1; 0+0 0+1; 0+1 0+1; 0+0 0+1	+1:22.8
7	18	Italy; Dorothea Wierer; Karin Oberhofer; Dominik Windisch; Lukas Hofer	1:21:51.9; 20:30.0; 20:01.1; 21:01.5; 20:19.3	0+6 0+4; 0+2 0+0; 0+0 0+1; 0+2 0+1; 0+2 0+2	+1:24.7
8	7	United States; Susan Dunklee; Hannah Dreissigacker; Lowell Bailey; Leif Nordgren	1:22:13.8; 20:01.2; 21:10.6; 20:54.6; 20:07.4	1+5 0+3; 0+1 0+1; 1+3 0+2; 0+0 0+0; 0+1 0+0	+1:46.6
9	16	Finland; Mari Laukkanen; Kaisa Mäkäräinen; Ahti Toivanen; Olli Hiidensalo	1:22:26.7; 20.35.2; 18.54.4; 21:55.5; 21:01.6	0+5 0+3; 0+3 0+0; 0+0 0+0; 0+0 0+1; 0+2 0+2	+1:59.5
10	4	Russia; Yana Romanova; Olga Podchufarova; Maxim Tsvetkov; Anton Shipulin	1:22:27.4; 20:27.0; 20:40.7; 21:32.8; 19:46.9	0+1 0+1; 0+0 0+0; 0+1 0+0; 0+0 0+1; 0+0 0+0	+2:00.2
11	3	Ukraine; Juliya Dzhyma; Valj Semerenko; Serhiy Semenov; Dmytro Pidruchnyi	1:22:37.5; 21:20.8; 18.46.3; 20:50.8; 20:39.6	0+2 0+8; 0+1 0+1; 0+1 0+2; 0+0 0+3; 0+0 0+2	+2:10.3
12	22	Canada; Audrey Vaillancourt; Rosanna Crawford; Nathan Smith; Brendan Green	1:22:55.1; 21:22.5; 20:02.3; 20:46.2; 20:44.1	0+3 0+1; 0+1 0+1; 0+1 0+0; 0+1 0+0; 0+1 0+0	+2:27.9
13	13	Switzerland; Aita Gasparin; Elisa Gasparin; Benjamin Weger; Mario Dolder	1:23:33.4; 21:00.3; 20:10.3; 21:20.9; 21:01.9	0+2 0+5; 0+0 0+0; 0+1 0+2; 0+0 0+1; 0+1 0+2	+3:06.2
14	15	Poland; Karolina Pitoń; Magdalena Gwizdoń; Łukasz Szczurek; Krzysztof Pływaczyk	1:23:41.8; 21:36.6; 19:35.5; 21:30.4; 20:59.3	0+1 0+2; 0+1 0+1; 0+0 0+0; 0+0 0+1; 0+0 0+0	+3:14.6
15	10	Slovenia; Andreja Mali; Anja Eržen; Klemen Bauer; Jakov Fak	1:24:15.4; 20.32.7; 23:00.7; 20:32.7; 20:09.3	0+2 3+5; 0+0 0+2; 0+1 3+3; 0+1 0+0; 0+0 0+0	+3:48.2
16	9	Sweden; Elisabeth Högberg; Mona Brorsson; Fredrik Lindström; Peppe Femling	1:24:28.2; 21:15.1; 21.14.6; 20.53.4; 21:05.1	0+5 0+3; 0+3 0+0; 0+0 0+0; 0+1 0+1; 0+1 0+2	+4:01.0
17	12	Slovakia; Paulína Fialková; Jana Gereková; Tomáš Hasilla; Martin Otčenáš	1:25:11.9; 20.40.8; 20:04.1; 21:21.3; 23:05.7	0+4 2+6; 0+0 0+1; 0+1 0+1; 0+0 0+1; 0+3 2+3	+4:44.7
18	14	Bulgaria; Emilia Yordanova; Desislava Stoyanova; Vladimir Iliev; Krasimir Anev	1:25:24.7; 21:45.7; 22:10.0; 21:29.6; 19.59.4	0+6 1+6; 0+2 0+0; 0+1 1+3; 0+2 0+3; 0+1 0+0	+4:57.5
19	24	Estonia; Kadri Lehtla; Daria Yurlova; Kauri Kõiv; Kalev Ermits	1:25:32.8; 20:38.2; 21:30.0; 21:45.1; 21:39.5	1+5 0+3; 0+1 0+1; 0+1 0+0; 0+0 0+2; 1+3 0+0	+5:05.6
20	17	Romania; Luminița Pișcoran; Florina Ioana Cîrstea; George Buta; Cornel Puchianu	1:25:44.5; 20:28.6; 22:51.5; 21:28.8; 20:55.6	0+5 0+2; 2+0 0+0; 0+0 0+2; 0+0 0+0; 0+3 0+0	+5:17.3
21	21	Japan; Fuyuko Suzuki; Yurie Tanaka; Mikito Tachizaki; Kazuya Inomata	1:25:50.8; 19.52.6; 21:39.4; 22:01.5; 22:17.3	0+5 1+7; 0+0 0+0; 0+3 0+2; 0+0 0+2; 0+2 1+3	+5:23.6
22	25	China; Tang Jialin; Zhang Yan; Ren Long; Tang Jinle	LAP; 21:20.2; 21:12.4; 22:36.7	0+8 0+4; 0+2 0+1; 0+2 0+0; 0+2 0+0; 0+2 0+3	
23	19	Lithuania; Diana Rasimovičiūtė; Natalija Paulauskaitė; Karol Dombrovski; Tomas Kaukėnas	LAP; 21:26.4; 22:54.2; 22:41.8	0+1 1+6; 0+0 0+1; 0+1 0+1; 0+0 0+1; 0+0 1+3	
24	23	Kazakhstan; Anna Kistanova; Darya Usanova; Yan Savitskiy; Maxim Braun	LAP; 22:58.6; 20.51.9; 23:12.6	3+9 0+8; 0+3 0+3; 0+0 0+3; 2+3 0+1; 1+3 0+1	
25	20	Great Britain; Amanda Lightfoot; Nerys Jones; Lee-Steve Jackson; Scott Dixon	LAP; 21:28.0; 23:50.8; 22:10.2	0+6 1+7; 0+0 0+3; 0+3 1+3; 0+1 0+1; 0+2 0+0	
26	26	South Korea; Mun Ji-hee; Ko Eun-jung; Jun Je-uk; Kim Jong-min	LAP; 21:51.2; 23:13.7; 23:45.4	0+5 3+8; 0+2 0+0; 0+2 2+3; 0+0 0+2; 0+1 1+3	
