= Nat Smith =

Nat Smith may refer to:

- Natalie Smith (disambiguation)
- Natasha Smith (disambiguation)
- Nate Smith (disambiguation)
- Nathan Smith (disambiguation)
- Nathaniel Smith (disambiguation)
  - Nathaniel Cannon Smith (1866–1943), American painter and architect, professionally known as Nat. C. Smith
