= Biathlon World Championships 2017 – Men's mass start =

Men's mass start at the Biathlon World Championships 2017
- Location: Hochfilzen, Austria
- Dates: 19 February
- Competitors: 30 from 13 nations
- Winning time: 35:38.3

Medalists
gold medal	Simon Schempp	Germany
silver medal	Johannes Thingnes Bø	Norway
bronze medal	Simon Eder	Austria

The Men's mass start competition at the 2017 World Championships was held on 19 February 2017.

== Results ==
The race was started at 14:45.

Rank	Bib	Name	Nationality	Penalties (P+P+S+S)	Time	Deficit
1st place, gold medalist(s)	8	Simon Schempp	Germany	0 (0+0+0+0)	35:38.3	
2nd place, silver medalist(s)	4	Johannes Thingnes Bø	Norway	1 (0+0+0+1)	35:47.3	+9.0
3rd place, bronze medalist(s)	17	Simon Eder	Austria	0 (0+0+0+0)	35:48.4	+10.1
4	7	Anton Shipulin	Russia	2 (0+1+1+0)	36:03.6	+25.3
5	2	Martin Fourcade	France	3 (1+0+0+2)	36:09.6	+31.3
6	3	Lowell Bailey	United States	0 (0+0+0+0)	36:11.8	+33.5
7	22	Dominik Landertinger	Austria	2 (0+0+0+2)	36:16.3	+38.0
8	27	Fredrik Lindström	Sweden	1 (0+0+1+0)	36:18.0	+39.7
9	1	Benedikt Doll	Germany	2 (0+0+2+0)	36:21.2	+42.9
10	9	Arnd Peiffer	Germany	2 (0+0+0+2)	36:24.4	+46.1
11	18	Evgeniy Garanichev	Russia	2 (0+0+2+0)	36:29.0	+50.7
12	16	Krasimir Anev	Bulgaria	1 (0+0+0+1)	36:31.3	+53.0
13	29	Michal Šlesingr	Czech Republic	2 (0+0+1+1)	36:32.4	+54.1
14	21	Tarjei Bø	Norway	2 (0+0+1+1)	36:35.2	+56.9
15	24	Quentin Fillon Maillet	France	3 (1+2+0+0)	36:41.7	+1:03.4
16	5	Ondřej Moravec	Czech Republic	2 (0+0+1+1)	36:46.0	+1:07.7
17	30	Klemen Bauer	Slovenia	2 (1+1+0+0)	36:54.3	+1:16.0
18	14	Jean-Guillaume Béatrix	France	2 (0+0+2+0)	36:57.0	+1:18.7
19	11	Julian Eberhard	Austria	5 (1+2+1+1)	36:59.2	+1:20.9
20	19	Vladimir Iliev	Bulgaria	3 (0+1+0+2)	37:00.2	+1:21.9
21	10	Erik Lesser	Germany	3 (0+0+3+0)	37:09.7	+1:31.4
22	15	Michal Krčmář	Czech Republic	1 (1+0+0+0)	37:20.3	+1:42.0
23	6	Ole Einar Bjørndalen	Norway	3 (1+2+0+0)	37:22.8	+1:44.5
24	23	Dominik Windisch	Italy	4 (1+0+3+0)	37:34.2	+1:55.9
25	25	Dmytro Pidruchnyi	Ukraine	4 (1+1+1+1)	37:34.9	+1:56.6
26	13	Maxim Tsvetkov	Russia	3 (1+0+1+1)	37:39.8	+2:01.5
27	20	Serhiy Semenov	Ukraine	4 (1+1+0+2)	37:48.0	+2:09.7
28	12	Emil Hegle Svendsen	Norway	5 (1+2+2+0)	38:18.6	+2:40.4
29	28	Serafin Wiestner	Switzerland	4 (2+1+1+0)	38:29.9	+2:51.6
30	26	Mario Dolder	Switzerland	4 (0+1+2+1)	39:05.6	+3:27.3
