= Biathlon at the 2017 Asian Winter Games – Men's mass start =

Men's 15 kilometre mass start at the 2017 Asian Winter Games
- Venue: Nishioka Biathlon Stadium
- Dates: 26 February 2017
- Competitors: 23 from 7 nations

Medalists
gold medal	Yan Savitskiy	Kazakhstan
silver medal	Wang Wenqiang	China
bronze medal	Kosuke Ozaki	Japan

The men's 15 kilometre mass start at the 2017 Asian Winter Games was held on February 26, 2017 at the Nishioka Biathlon Stadium.

== Schedule ==
All times are Japan Standard Time (UTC+09:00)

Date	Time	Event
Sunday, 26 February 2017	10:00	Final

== Results ==
Legend

- DNS — Did not start

Rank	Athlete	Penalties					Time
Rank	Athlete	P	P	S	S	Total	Time
1st place, gold medalist(s)	Yan Savitskiy (KAZ)	0	1	1	1	3	44:12.2
2nd place, silver medalist(s)	Wang Wenqiang (CHN)	0	0	1	0	1	44:54.1
3rd place, bronze medalist(s)	Kosuke Ozaki (JPN)	0	2	2	1	5	45:11.5
4	Lee In-bok (KOR)	2	0	1	1	4	45:26.5
5	Mikito Tachizaki (JPN)	1	3	1	1	6	45:35.2
6	Vassiliy Podkorytov (KAZ)	1	0	1	1	3	45:38.5
7	Tsukasa Kobonoki (JPN)	2	2	1	2	7	45:48.3
8	Anton Pantov (KAZ)	2	1	0	2	5	45:51.6
9	Tang Jinle (CHN)	0	0	1	2	3	45:56.2
10	Maxim Braun (KAZ)	2	1	0	1	4	46:24.7
11	Kim Yong-gyu (KOR)	2	2	2	2	8	47:36.4
12	Junji Nagai (JPN)	3	2	1	2	8	47:44.2
13	Kim Jong-min (KOR)	2	2	3	5	12	50:28.7
14	Heo Seon-hoe (KOR)	3	3	2	2	10	50:28.7
15	Erdenechimegiin Barkhüü (MGL)	1	2	2	3	8	50:54.6
16	Hu Weiyao (CHN)	0	1	3	1		Lapped
17	Enkhbayaryn Mönkh-Erdene (MGL)	1	2	1	1		Lapped
18	Kao Pengyu (CHN)	0	2	2	2		Lapped
19	Battüvshingiin Bat-Erdene (MGL)	1	3	4	4		Lapped
20	Jeremy Flanagan (AUS)	3	0	4			Lapped
—	Damon Morton (AUS)						DNS
—	Tariel Zharkymbaev (KGZ)						DNS
—	Nurbek Doolatov (KGZ)						DNS
