= Biathlon at the 2017 Asian Winter Games – Men's pursuit =

Men's 12.5 kilometre pursuit at the 2017 Asian Winter Games
- Venue: Nishioka Biathlon Stadium
- Dates: 24 February 2017
- Competitors: 23 from 7 nations

Medalists
gold medal	Mikito Tachizaki	Japan
silver medal	Yan Savitskiy	Kazakhstan
bronze medal	Kim Yong-gyu	South Korea

The men's 12.5 kilometre pursuit at the 2017 Asian Winter Games was held on February 24, 2017 at the Nishioka Biathlon Stadium.

== Schedule ==
All times are Japan Standard Time (UTC+09:00)

Date	Time	Event
Friday, 24 February 2017	10:00	Final

== Results ==
Rank	Athlete	Start	Penalties					Time
Rank	Athlete	Start	P	P	S	S	Total	Time
1st place, gold medalist(s)	Mikito Tachizaki (JPN)	0:20	1	1	0	1	3	38:47.2
2nd place, silver medalist(s)	Yan Savitskiy (KAZ)	0:00	1	0	2	2	5	38:53.0
3rd place, bronze medalist(s)	Kim Yong-gyu (KOR)	0:37	2	0	3	0	5	39:58.7
4	Kim Jong-min (KOR)	0:53	2	1	0	1	4	40:13.3
5	Junji Nagai (JPN)	0:49	0	2	3	0	5	40:14.2
6	Lee In-bok (KOR)	1:56	1	0	1	0	2	41:02.9
7	Tsukasa Kobonoki (JPN)	0:34	1	2	3	3	9	41:13.7
8	Wang Wenqiang (CHN)	1:56	0	2	0	2	4	41:14.5
9	Vassiliy Podkorytov (KAZ)	0:15	1	5	1	1	8	41:36.2
10	Maxim Braun (KAZ)	1:10	0	2	2	1	5	41:52.8
11	Kosuke Ozaki (JPN)	2:05	0	3	2	2	7	42:36.3
12	Anton Pantov (KAZ)	1:53	1	4	0	1	6	42:45.6
13	Damon Morton (AUS)	2:23	0	1	1	2	4	43:52.8
14	Tang Jinle (CHN)	2:26	1	2	1	3	7	44:15.1
15	Heo Seon-hoe (KOR)	3:11	4	2	2			Lapped
16	Erdenechimegiin Barkhüü (MGL)	3:56	2	3	3			Lapped
17	Enkhbayaryn Mönkh-Erdene (MGL)	7:38	0	2	4			Lapped
18	Hu Weiyao (CHN)	5:36	1	0				Lapped
19	Jeremy Flanagan (AUS)	6:41	1	2				Lapped
20	Kao Pengyu (CHN)	7:13	1	2				Lapped
21	Battüvshingiin Bat-Erdene (MGL)	6:44	2	4				Lapped
22	Tariel Zharkymbaev (KGZ)	7:15	4					Lapped
23	Nurbek Doolatov (KGZ)	12:14	5					Lapped
