= Tachizaki =

Tachizaki (written: 細山田) is a Japanese surname. Notable people with the surname include:

- Fuyuko Tachizaki (立崎 芙由子; born 1989), Japanese biathlete
- Mikito Tachizaki (立崎 幹人; born 1988), Japanese biathlete
