= Biathlon at the 2017 Asian Winter Games – Men's sprint =

Men's 10 kilometre sprint at the 2017 Asian Winter Games
- Venue: Nishioka Biathlon Stadium
- Dates: 23 February 2017
- Competitors: 24 from 8 nations

Medalists
gold medal	Yan Savitskiy	Kazakhstan
silver medal	Vassiliy Podkorytov	Kazakhstan
bronze medal	Mikito Tachizaki	Japan

The men's 10 kilometre sprint at the 2017 Asian Winter Games was held on February 23, 2017 at the Nishioka Biathlon Stadium.

== Schedule ==
All times are Japan Standard Time (UTC+09:00)

Date	Time	Event
Thursday, 23 February 2017	10:00	Final

== Results ==
Rank	Athlete	Penalties			Time
Rank	Athlete	P	S	Total	Time
1st place, gold medalist(s)	Yan Savitskiy (KAZ)	1	0	1	26:59.2
2nd place, silver medalist(s)	Vassiliy Podkorytov (KAZ)	1	1	2	27:14.2
3rd place, bronze medalist(s)	Mikito Tachizaki (JPN)	1	0	1	27:19.4
4	Tsukasa Kobonoki (JPN)	2	1	3	27:33.0
5	Kim Yong-gyu (KOR)	2	1	3	27:36.5
6	Junji Nagai (JPN)	2	0	2	27:48.0
7	Kim Jong-min (KOR)	1	0	1	27:52.3
8	Maxim Braun (KAZ)	0	2	2	28:09.3
9	Anton Pantov (KAZ)	2	2	4	28:52.4
10	Wang Wenqiang (CHN)	0	1	1	28:55.5
10	Lee In-bok (KOR)	1	3	4	28:55.5
12	Kosuke Ozaki (JPN)	2	3	5	29:04.7
13	Damon Morton (AUS)	1	1	2	29:21.9
14	Tang Jinle (CHN)	0	2	2	29:25.2
15	Heo Seon-hoe (KOR)	2	1	3	30:10.1
16	Erdenechimegiin Barkhüü (MGL)	2	2	4	30:55.5
17	Hu Weiyao (CHN)	2	0	2	32:35.5
18	Jeremy Flanagan (AUS)	0	1	1	33:40.1
19	Battüvshingiin Bat-Erdene (MGL)	2	4	6	33:43.3
20	Kao Pengyu (CHN)	1	3	4	34:12.2
21	Tariel Zharkymbaev (KGZ)	3	2	5	34:13.8
22	Enkhbayaryn Mönkh-Erdene (MGL)	1	1	2	34:37.4
23	Nurbek Doolatov (KGZ)	2	3	5	39:13.6
24	Wang Yao-yi (TPE)	1	2	3	45:55.9
