= Nathaniel Smith =

Nathaniel Smith may refer to:

== Politics ==
- Nathaniel Smith (British politician) (1730–1794), English member of parliament for Rochester and Pontefract
- Nathaniel Smith (American politician, born 1762) (1762–1822), U.S. representative from Connecticut
- Nathaniel Benedict Smith (1795–1881), Connecticut legislator, son of the above
- Nathaniel Smith (New York politician), member of the 55th New York State Legislature (1832) for Tioga County
- Nathaniel W. Smith (1873–1957), lieutenant governor of Rhode Island
- Nathaniel Smith (Australian politician) (born 1980), member of the New South Wales Legislative Assembly

== Others ==
- Nathaniel Cannon Smith (1866–1943), American painter and architect
- Nathaniel Clark Smith (1877–1935), African-American musician, composer and music educator

== See also ==
- Nathaniel Smith House, an historic building in Union County, New Jersey, United States
- Sir Nathaniel Bowden-Smith (1838–1921), Royal Navy admiral
- Nathaniel Erskine-Smith (born 1984), politician in Ontario, Canada
- Nathan Smith (disambiguation)
- Nate Smith (disambiguation)
