= Nathan Smith =

Nathan Smith may refer to:

== Sports ==
- Nathan Smith (Irish cricketer) (born 1995), Irish cricketer
- Nathan Smith (New Zealand cricketer) (born 1998), New Zealand cricketer
- Nathan Smith (rugby league, born 1983), Australian rugby league player for Penrith Panthers
- Nathan Smith (rugby league, born 1988), Australian rugby league footballer for the Parramatta Eels
- Nathan Smith (footballer, born 1987), English-born Jamaican football player
- Nathan Smith (soccer, born 1994), American soccer player
- Nathan Smith (footballer, born 1996), English football player
- Nathan Smith (golfer) (born 1978), American amateur golfer
- Nate Smith (golfer) (born 1983), American professional golfer on the Nationwide Tour
- Nathan Smith (ice hockey, born 1982), Canadian NHL player
- Nathan Smith (ice hockey, born 1998), American Olympic hockey player
- Nathan Smith (biathlete) (born 1985), Canadian biathlete

== Others ==
- Nathan Smith (politician) (1770–1835), U.S. Senator
- Nathan B. Smith (1841–1920), American lawyer and politician
- Nathan Lloyd Smith (1975–2002), Canadian soldier, killed in Afghanistan
- Nathan Smith (physician, born 1762) (1762–1829), U.S. physician, founder of several U.S. medical schools
- Nathan Ryno Smith (1797–1877), U.S. physician, professor at University of Maryland

== See also ==
- Nathaniel Smith (disambiguation)
- Nate Smith (disambiguation)
