= Biathlon Junior World Championships 2007 =

Biathlon event in Italy

The 2007 Biathlon Junior World Championships was held in Martell, Italy from January 24 to January 31 2007. There was to be a total of 16 competitions: sprint, pursuit, individual, mass start, and relay races for men and women.

== Medal winners ==
=== Youth Women ===
Event:	Gold:	Time	Silver:	Time	Bronze:	Time
10 km individual details	Laure Bosc; France	38:13.1 (0+0+0+0)	Ksenia Kulikova; Russia	38:57.6 (0+0+0+1)	Marie Laure Brunet; France	40:04.5 (1+2+1+0)
6 km sprint details	Laure Bosc; France	22:46.4 (0+2)	Ksenia Kulikova; Russia	23:01.2 (1+1)	Pinja Piira; Finland	23:09.0 (1+1)
7.5 km pursuit details	Marie Laure Brunet; France	27:04.7 (0+1+0+1)	Ksenia Kulikova; Russia	27:51.1 (0+1+0+2)	Laure Bosc; France	28:24.1 (0+1+2+0)
3 × 6 km relay details	France; Laure Bosc; Marine Bolliet; Marie Laure Brunet	1:02:46.3 (0+0) (0+1) (0+0) (0+1) (0+1) (0+2)	Russia; Olga Vilukhina; Ksenia Kulikova; Nadezda Grebneva	1:04:45.2 (0+0) (0+0) (0+1) (0+3) (0+1) (0+2)	Norway; Ada Ringen; Karianne Grue Tufte; Frida Schneider	1:05:46.3 (0+1) (0+2) (0+0) (0+3) (0+1) (0+2)

=== Junior Women ===
Event:	Gold:	Time	Silver:	Time	Bronze:	Time
12.5 km individual details	Evgeniya Sedova; Russia	45:04.2 (0+0+0+0)	Carolin Hennecke; Germany	45:40.8 (0+0+0+2)	Anaïs Bescond; France	45:58.1 (0+0+0+0)
7.5 km sprint details	Svetlana Sleptsova; Russia	25:44.4 (2+1)	Darya Domracheva; Belarus	26:05.3 (4+0)	Anaïs Bescond; France	26:26.8 (0+1)
10 km pursuit details	Svetlana Sleptsova; Russia	35:22.9 (0+1+1+2)	Darya Domracheva; Belarus	35:41.2 (2+1+1+1)	Juliane Döll; Germany	35:52.3 (0+0+1+1)
3 × 6 km relay details	Germany; Franziska Hildebrand; Juliane Döll; Carolin Hennecke	1:00:19.4 (0+1) (0+2) (0+1) (0+1) (0+1) (0+2)	France; Anaïs Bescond; Marion Blondeau; Pauline Macabies	1:01:16.6 (0+3) (0+0) (0+2) (0+0) (0+1) (0+0)	Norway; Vilde Ravnsborg Gurigard; Kjersti Isaksen; Julie Bonnevie-Svendsen	1:02:44.9 (0+0) (0+1) (0+0) (0+0) (0+0) (1+3)

=== Youth Men ===
Event:	Gold:	Time	Silver:	Time	Bronze:	Time
12.5 km individual details	Łukasz Szczurek; Poland	44:18.1 (0+1+0+0)	Pavel Magazeev; Russia	45:07.8 (2+0+0+2)	Jean-Guillaume Béatrix; France	45:12.8 (0+0+0+3)
7.5 km sprint details	Talgat Golyashov; Russia	22:41.0 (0+0)	Dominik Landertinger; Austria	22:42.8 (1+2)	Florian Graf; Germany	22:57.6 (1+2)
10 km pursuit details	Florian Graf; Germany	31:09.9 (0+0+1+3)	Tarjei Bø; Norway	31:26.4 (0+1+1+1)	Talgat Golyashov; Russia	31:44.2 (0+0+0+0)
3 × 7.5 km relay details	Austria; Daniel Salvenmoser; Benjamin Riedlsperger; Dominik Landertinger	1:08:57.3 (0+1) (0+0) (2+3) (1+3) (0+1) (0+3)	Norway; Espen Årvag; Magnus L'Abeé-Lund; Tarjei Bø	1:09:03.8 (1+3) (0+1) (1+3) (0+2) (1+3) (0+1)	France; Jean-Guillaume Béatrix; Yann Guigonnet; Martin Fourcade	1:10:13.5 (0+2) (0+0) (0+0) (0+3) (0+1) (0+2)

=== Junior Men ===
Event:	Gold:	Time	Silver:	Time	Bronze:	Time
15 km individual details	Evgeny Abramenko; Belarus	46:29.0 (0+0+0+0)	Anton Shipulin; Russia	47:57.7 (1+0+0+0)	Klemen Bauer; Slovenia	48:17.0 (0+2+0+1)
10 km sprint details	Christoph Stephan; Germany	28:06.4 (3+2)	Daniel Böhm; Germany	28:19.3 (1+3)	Henrik L'Abée-Lund; Norway	28:25.5 (1+3)
12.5 km pursuit details	Christoph Stephan; Germany	36:58.8 (0+0+1+0)	Daniel Böhm; Germany	37:34.5 (1+0+1+0)	Simon Schempp; Germany	38:19.1 (1+1+0+0)
4 × 7.5 km relay details	Germany; Daniel Böhm; Simon Schempp; Sebastian Berthold; Christoph Stephan	1:27:08.9 (0+3) (0+2) (0+1) (0+0) (0+1) (0+0) (0+0) (0+0)	Norway; Magnus Hals; Henrik L'Abée-Lund; Aril Askestad; Martin Eng	1:30:13.6 (0+2) (0+0) (0+0) (0+1) (0+1) (0+0) (0+1) (1+3)	Canada; Marc-André Bédard; Yannick Letailleur; Maxime Leboeuf; Brendan Green	1:30:14.3 (0+3) (0+1) (0+0) (0+3) (0+1) (0+1) (0+2) (0+2)

== Medal table ==
Rank	Nation	Gold	Silver	Bronze	Total
1	Germany (GER)	5	3	3	11
2	Russia (RUS)	4	6	1	11
3	France (FRA)	4	1	6	11
4	Belarus (BLR)	1	2	0	3
5	Austria (AUT)	1	1	0	2
6	Poland (POL)	1	0	0	1
7	Norway (NOR)	0	3	3	6
8	Canada (CAN)	0	0	1	1
8	Finland (FIN)	0	0	1	1
8	Slovenia (SLO)	0	0	1	1
Totals (10 entries)		16	16	16	48
