= Tuomas Grönman (biathlete) =

Finnish biathlete

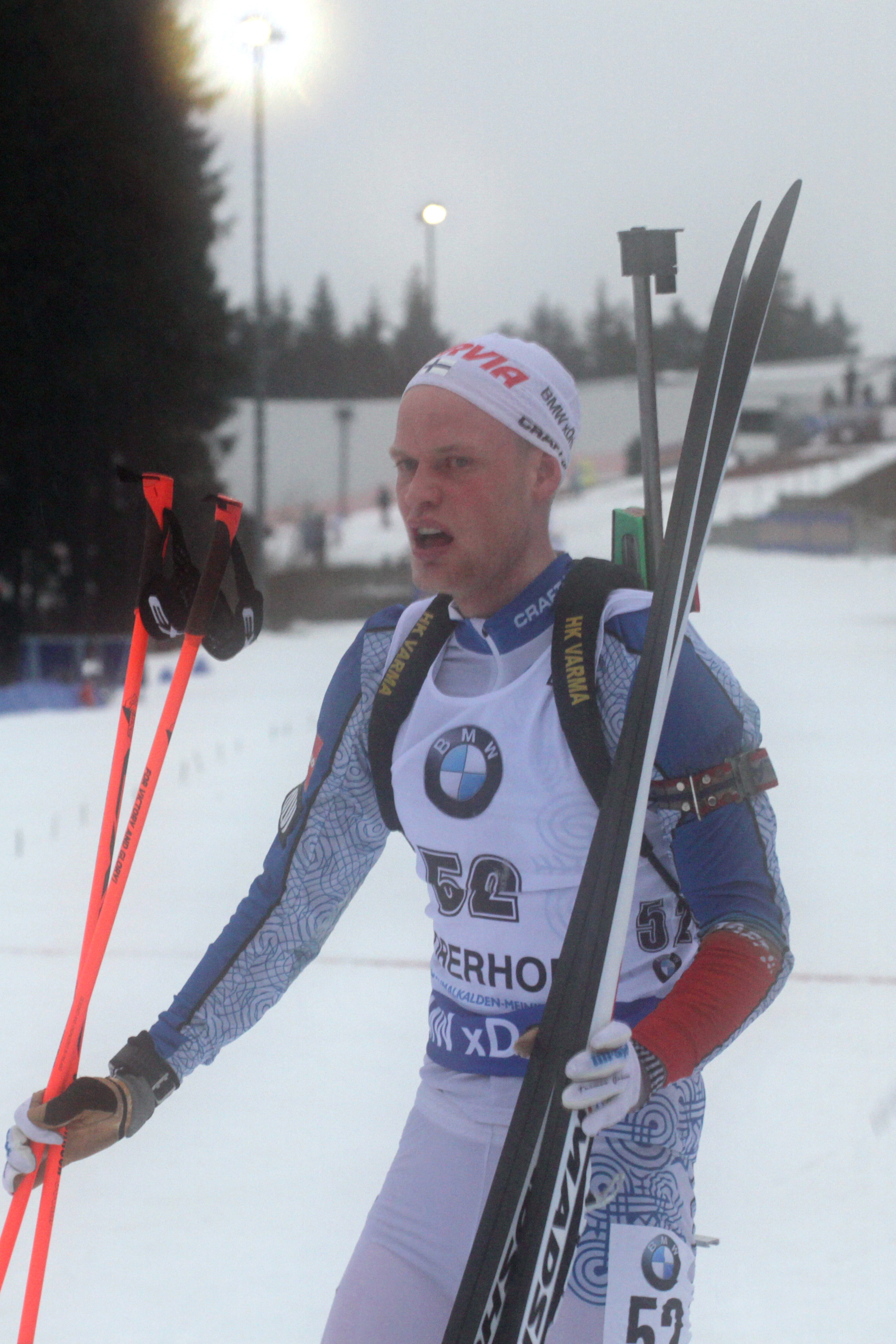
- Grönman in 2018

Personal information
- Born: 19 September 1991 (age 34)

Sport

Professional information
- Sport: Biathlon
- Club: Kontiolahden urheilijat
- World Cup debut: 2014

Olympic Games
- Teams: 1
- Medals: 0

World Championships
- Teams: 4 (2015, 2016, 2017, 2019)
- Medals: 0

World Cup
- Seasons: 4 (2014/15–2018/19)
- Individual victories: 0
- All victories: 0
- Individual podiums: 0
- All podiums: 0

Tuomas Grönman (born 19 September 1991 in Kouvola, Finland) is a Finnish biathlete.

== Biathlon results ==
All results are sourced from the International Biathlon Union.

=== Winter Olympics ===
Event	Individual	Sprint	Pursuit	Mass start	Relay	Mixed relay
(South Korea) 2018 Pyeongchang	48	55	45	—		

=== World Championships ===
Event	Individual	Sprint	Pursuit	Mass start	Relay	Mixed relay
(Finland) 2015 Kontiolahti	—	103rd	—	—	13th	—
(Norway) 2016 Oslo	88th	89th	—	—	19th	18th
(Austria) 2017 Hochfilzen	—	66th	—	—	20th	10th
(Sweden) 2019 Östersund	78th	37th	40th	—	17th	—
