= Nate Smith =

Nate Smith may refer to:

- Nate Smith (catcher) (1935–2019), American baseball player
- Nate Smith (golfer) (born 1983), American golfer
- Nate Smith (drummer) (born 1974), American drummer
- Nate Smith (pitcher) (born 1991), baseball pitcher
- Nate Smith (singer), American country music singer
  - Nate Smith (album), 2023
- Nate Smith (water skier) (born 1990), American water skier

== See also ==
- Nathaniel Smith (disambiguation)
- Nathan Smith (disambiguation)
