= Natalie Smith =

Natalie Smith may refer to:

- Natalie Smith (sport shooter) (born 1975), Australian Paralympic shooter
- Natalie Smith (actress) (born 1991), Brazilian actress, producer, director, and screenwriter

== See also ==
- Natalie Smith Henry (1907–1992), American artist
