= Simon Fourcade =

French biathlete (born 1984)

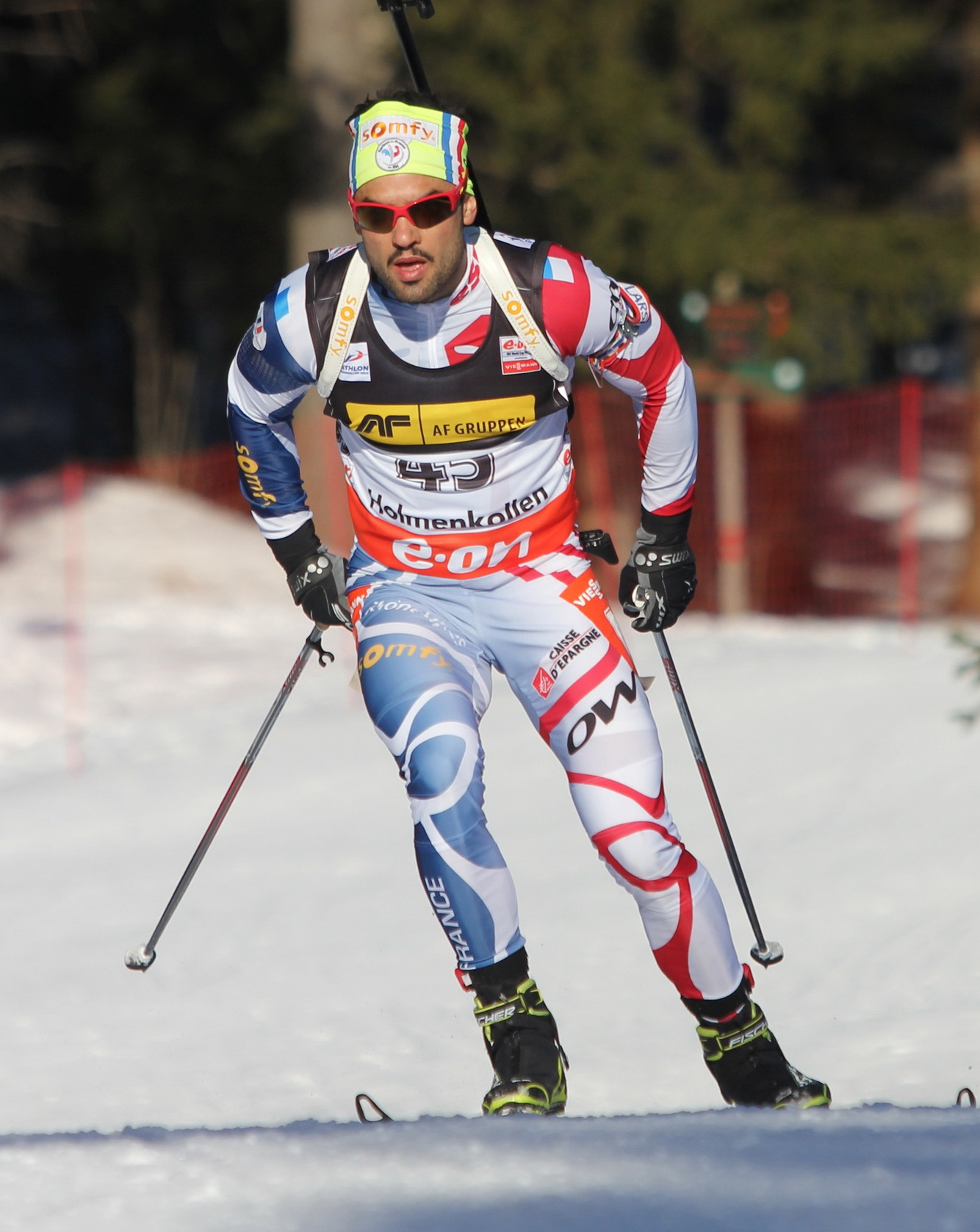

Personal information
- Full name: Simon Fourcade
- Born: 25 April 1984 (age 42) Perpignan, France
- Height: 1.73 m (5 ft 8 in)

Sport

Olympic Games
- Teams: 3 (2006, 2010, 2014)
- Medals: 0

World Championships
- Teams: 12 (2006-2019)
- Medals: 5 (1 gold)

World Cup
- Seasons: 15 (2003/04–2018/19)
- Individual victories: 0
- All victories: 8
- Discipline titles: 1: 1 Individual (2011/12)
Medal record
Men's biathlon
Representing France
World Championships
Gold medal – first place	2009 Pyeongchang	Mixed relay
Silver medal – second place	2012 Ruhpolding	4 × 7.5 km relay
Silver medal – second place	2012 Ruhpolding	20 km individual
Silver medal – second place	2013 Nové Město	4 × 7.5 km relay
Bronze medal – third place	2015 Kontiolahti	4 × 7.5 km relay
Junior World Championships
Gold medal – first place	2004 Haute Maurienne	10 km sprint
Gold medal – first place	2004 Haute Maurienne	12.5 km pursuit
Gold medal – first place	2005 Kontiolahti	12.5 km pursuit
Silver medal – second place	2004 Haute Maurienne	15 km individual
Silver medal – second place	2005 Kontiolahti	10 km sprint
Silver medal – second place	2005 Kontiolahti	4 × 7.5 km relay
Youth World Championships
Gold medal – first place	2003 Kościelisko	12.5 km individual
Silver medal – second place	2002 Ridnaun	7.5 km sprint

Simon Fourcade (born 25 April 1984) is a French former biathlete and non-commissioned officer. He won a gold medal in the individual at the 2003 Biathlon Junior World Championships. Although he never took a solo World Cup race win, he took eight World Cup wins as a member of relay teams - six in men's relays and two in mixed relays. He retired from competition in March 2019.

He is the older brother of fellow biathlete Martin Fourcade.

== Biathlon results ==
=== Olympics ===
Event	Individual	Sprint	Pursuit	Mass start	Relay	Mixed relay
(Italy) 2006 Torino	31st	—	—	—	—	—
(Canada) 2010 Vancouver	40th	71st	—	14th	6th	—
(Russia) 2014 Sochi	13th	36th	18th	DNF	—	—

=== World Championships ===
5 medals (1 gold, 3 silver, 1 bronze)

Event	Individual	Sprint	Pursuit	Mass start	Relay	Mixed relay	Single mixed relay
(Slovenia) 2006 Pokljuka	—N/a	—N/a	—N/a	—N/a	—N/a	11th	—N/a
(Italy) 2007 Antholz	8th	37th	25th	8th	10th	—	—N/a
(Sweden) 2008 Östersund	4th	20th	6th	27th	5th	—	—N/a
(South Korea) 2009 Pyeongchang	4th	6th	10th	9th	4th	Gold	—N/a
(Russia) 2010 Khanty-Mansiysk	—N/a	—N/a	—N/a	—N/a	—N/a	5th	—N/a
(Russia) 2011 Khanty-Mansiysk	39th	13th	6th	15th	12th	—	—N/a
(Germany) 2012 Ruhpolding	Silver	5th	6th	5th	Silver	11th	—N/a
(Czech Republic) 2013 Nové Město	6th	34th	23rd	9th	Silver	—	—N/a
(Finland) 2015 Kontiolahti	4th	4th	10th	9th	Bronze	—	—N/a
(Norway) 2016 Oslo Holmenkollen	10th	53rd	40th	—	9th	—	—N/a
(Austria) 2017 Hochfilzen	—	85th	—	—	—	—	—N/a
(Sweden) 2019 Östersund	19th	—	—	—	—	—	—

*During Olympic seasons competitions are only held for those events not included in the Olympic program.
**The single mixed relay was added as an event in 2019.

=== World Cup ===
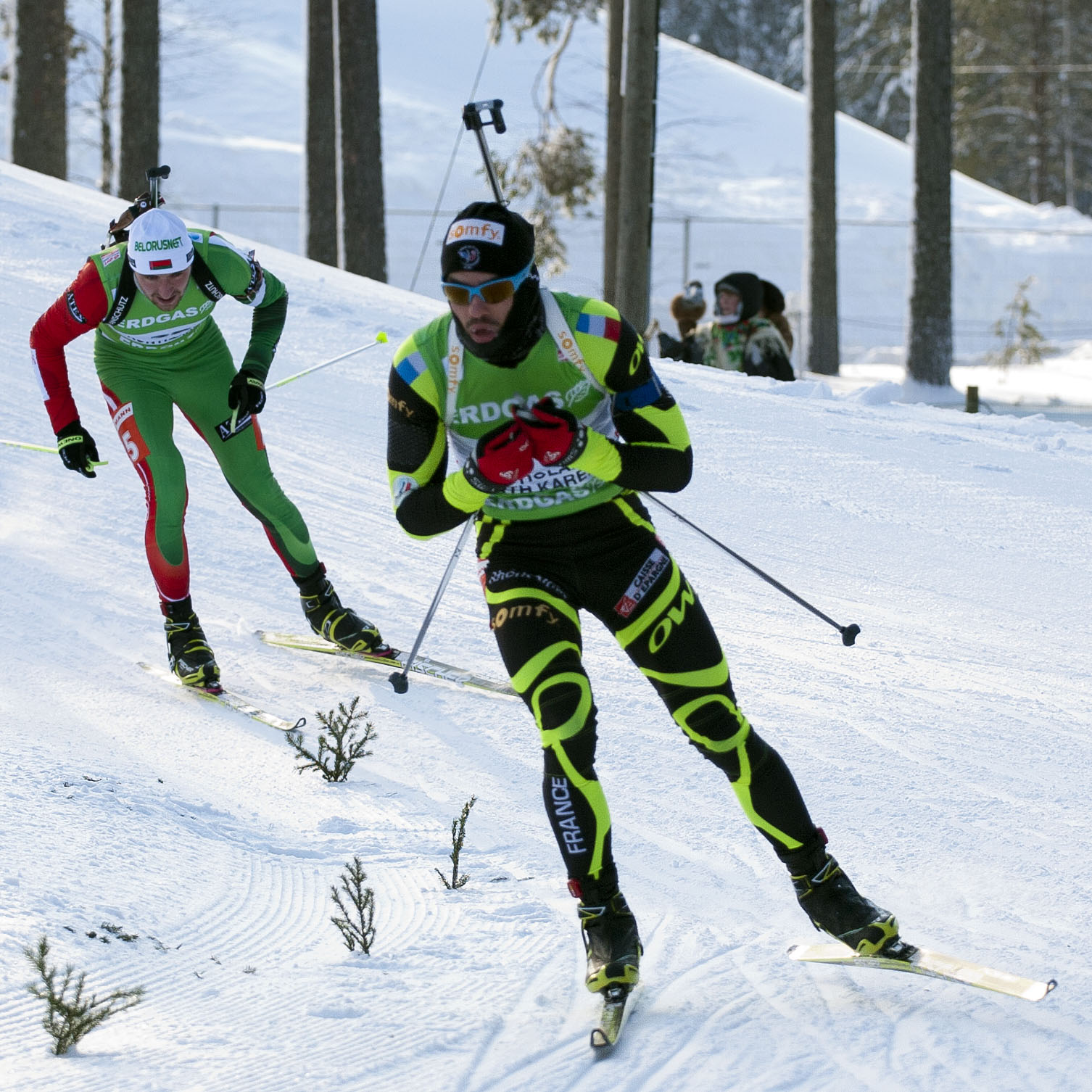
Kontiolahti, Finland, 12 February 2012

World Cup rankings

Season	Overall	Individual	Sprint	Pursuit	Mass Start
2003–04	79th	-	-	65th	-
2005–06	49th	-	40th	39th	41st
2006–07	23rd	8th	34th	23rd	24th
2007–08	17th	6th	23rd	16th	22nd
2008–09	15th	29th	14th	14th	12th
2009–10	7th	12th	9th	11th	9th
2010–11	30th	24th	39th	16th	42nd
2011–12	5th	1st	10th	10th	6th
2012–13	27th	29th	33rd	23rd	24th
2013–14	39th	5th	51st	34th	-
2014–15	11th	6th	16th	11th	12th
2015–16	27th	13th	35th	31st	19th
2016–17	38th	23rd	44th	35th	-
2017–18	42nd	42nd	48th	40th	36th
2018–19	37th	14th	46th	33rd	-

Relay victories

8 victories

No.	Season	Date	Location	Discipline	Level	Team
1	2008–09	19 February 2009	(South Korea) Pyeongchang	Mixed Relay	Biathlon World Championships	Brunet / Becaert / Defrasne / S.Fourcade
2	2009–10	6 December 2009	(Sweden) Östersund	Relay	Biathlon World Cup	Jay / Defrasne / S.Fourcade / Fourcade
3	2011–12	22 January 2012	(Italy) Antholz-Anterselva	Relay	Biathlon World Cup	Béatrix / S.Fourcade / Boeuf / Fourcade
4	2012–13	10 January 2013	(Germany) Ruhpolding	Relay	Biathlon World Cup	S.Fourcade / Béatrix / Boeuf / Fourcade
5	2012–13	20 January 2013	(Italy) Antholz-Anterselva	Relay	Biathlon World Cup	S.Fourcade / Béatrix / Boeuf / Fourcade
6	2013–14	19 January 2014	(Italy) Antholz-Anterselva	Relay	Biathlon World Cup	S.Fourcade / Boeuf / Béatrix / Fourcade
7	2014–15	30 November 2014	(Sweden) Östersund	Mixed Relay	Biathlon World Cup	Bescond / Chevalier / S.Fourcade / Fourcade
8	2016–17	5 March 2017	(South Korea) Pyeongchang	Relay	Biathlon World Cup	Béatrix / S.Fourcade / Desthieux / Fourcade
