= Natasha Smith =

Natasha Smith may refer to:

- Natasha Smith (rugby league), Canadian rugby union and rugby league footballer
- Natasha Smith (diplomat), Australian High Commissioner to Canada
