= Nathaniel Smith (American politician, born 1762) =

American judge

Member of the U.S. House of Representatives from Connecticut's at-large district
- In office March 4, 1795 – March 3, 1799
- Preceded by: Roger Griswold
- Succeeded by: James Davenport

Member of the Connecticut House of Representatives
- In office 1789-1795

Personal details
- Born: January 6, 1762 Woodbury, Connecticut Colony, British America
- Died: March 9, 1822 (aged 60) Norwich, Connecticut, U.S.
- Party: Federalist
- Spouse: Ruth Benedict Smith
- Relations: Nathan Smith and Truman Smith
- Children: Harriet J. Smith and Nathaniel Benedict Smith
- Parent(s): Richard Smith and Annis (Hurd) Smith
- Education: Litchfield Law School
- Occupation: Lawyer, judge, politician

Nathaniel Smith (January 6, 1762 – March 9, 1822) was a nineteenth-century lawyer, cattle dealer, judge and politician. He served as a U.S. representative from Connecticut and as a judge of the Supreme Court of Connecticut.

== Biography ==
Smith was born in Woodbury in the Connecticut Colony, the son of Richard Smith and Annis (Hurd) Smith. He attended the common schools and engaged in agricultural pursuits. He was also a cattle dealer. Smith attended the Litchfield Law School. He studied law and was admitted to the bar in 1787. Smith began the practice of law in Woodbury.

In 1789 Smith became a member of the Connecticut House of Representatives, unsuccessfully ran for Congress in 1793, and served in the State House until 1795. He was elected as a Federalist candidate to the Fourth and Fifth Congresses, serving from March 4, 1795, to March 3, 1799. He declined to be a candidate for renomination in 1798.

Smith served as a member of the Connecticut council of assistants from 1799 to 1804. He served in the Connecticut Senate from 1800 to 1805. Smith was State's Attorney for Litchfield County in 1805.

In 1806 he became judge of the Supreme Court of Connecticut. He kept this position for thirteen years. He was also a delegate to the Hartford Convention from 1814 to 1815. Smith died in Woodbury on March 9, 1822. He is interred in the Episcopal Church Cemetery.

== Personal life ==
Smith married Ruth Benedict Smith. They had two children, Harriet J. Smith and Nathaniel Benedict Smith.

Smith was the brother of Nathan Smith, United States Senator from Connecticut, and the uncle of Truman Smith, United States Senator from Connecticut.

U.S. House of Representatives
Preceded by Jeremiah Wadsworth	Member of the U.S. House of Representatives from Connecticut's at-large congressional district March 4, 1795 – March 3, 1799	Succeeded by Elizur Goodrich
