= Nathaniel Benedict Smith =

American politician (1795–1881)

Nathaniel Benedict Smith (December 7, 1795 – February 5, 1881) was an American lawyer, judge, and politician.

== Early life ==
Nathaniel Benedict Smith was born on December 7, 1795, in Woodbury, Connecticut, the only child of Ruth Benedict and Nathaniel Smith, judge of the Supreme Court of Connecticut. His grandfather was Reverend Noah Benedict, third pastor of the First Church in Woodbury. Smith graduated from Yale College in 1815. He studied law in the office of his uncle, the Hon. Noah B. Benedict, of Woodbury, and at Judge Tapping Reeve's Law School in Litchfield, and was admitted to the bar in 1818.

== Career ==
Smith began practice in New Haven, but was returned to Woodbury due to his father's health. After two or three years, he withdrew from his profession due to the time needed to work his father's large property He represented the town in the Connecticut General Assembly in 1828, and again in 1847. Starting in May 1838, he held the office of Judge of Probate for four years. He farmed for the remainder of his life.

== Personal life ==
Smith married Mary Ann W. Goodrich, daughter of Reverend Samuel Goodrich, of Berlin on February 22, 1819. His wife died in 1872. They had two daughters and one son.

Smith died at his house in Woodbury on February 5, 1881.
