= Roberts Slotiņš =

Latvian cross country skier (born 1991)

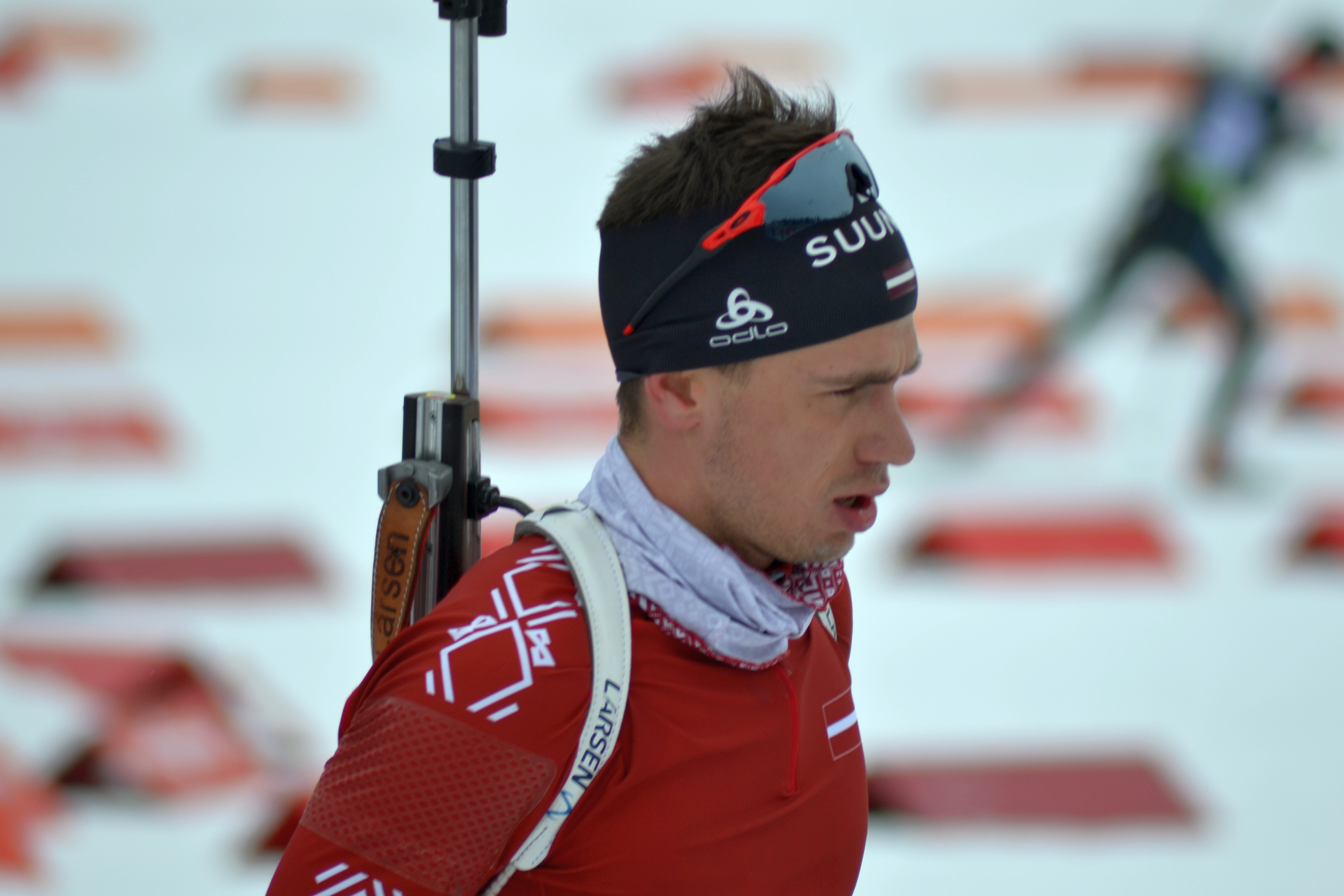

Personal information
- Nationality: Latvian
- Born: 21 July 1991 (age 35) Cēsis, Latvia

Sport
- Sport: Skiing
- Club: SS Arkadija

Roberts Slotiņš (born 21 July 1991) is a Latvian cross country skier who represented Latvia at the 2022 Winter Olympics. He trains out of Mazsalaca.

== Biathlon results ==
All results are sourced from the International Biathlon Union.

=== World Championships ===
0 medals

Event	Individual	Sprint	Pursuit	Mass start	Relay	Mixed relay	Single mixed relay
(Sweden) 2019 Östersund	92nd	87th	—	—	24th	23rd	—
(Italy) 2020 Rasen-Antholz	91st	84th	—	—	22nd	—	—
(Slovenia) 2021 Pokljuka	—	94th	—	—	DSQ	—	—

*During Olympic seasons competitions are only held for those events not included in the Olympic program.
