= Simon Schempp =

German biathlete (born 1988)

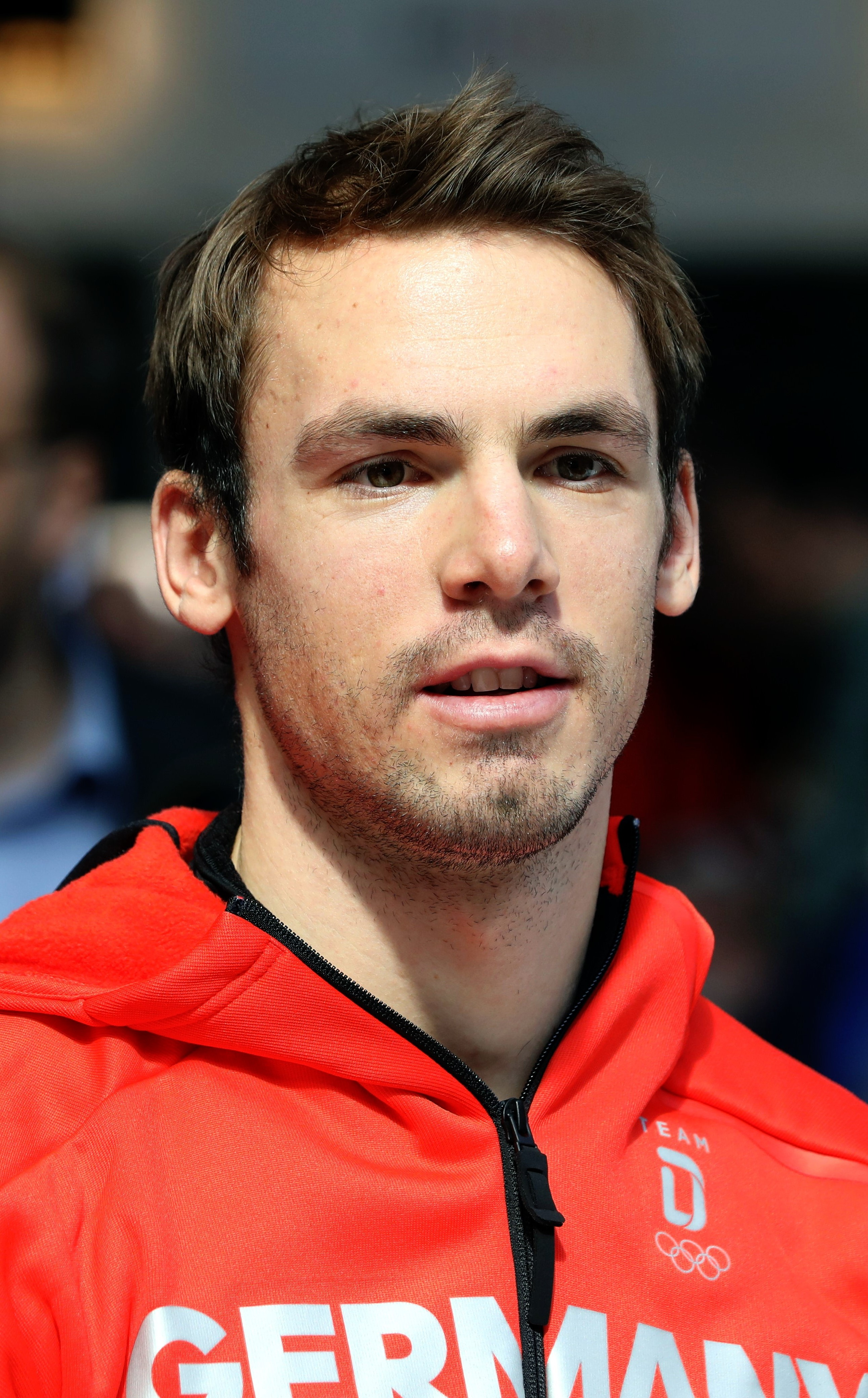
- Schempp in 2018

Personal information
- Born: 14 November 1988 (age 37) Mutlangen, West Germany
- Occupation: Customs officer
- Height: 1.78 m (5 ft 10 in)
- Website: simon.com.de

Sport

Professional information
- Sport: Biathlon
- Club: SZ Uhingen
- Skis: Rossignol
- Rifle: Anschütz
- World Cup debut: 11 March 2009

Olympic Games
- Teams: 3 (2010, 2014, 2018)
- Medals: 3 (1 gold)

World Championships
- Teams: 4 (2010, 2012, 2013, 2015, 2017)
- Medals: 8 (4 gold)

World Cup
- Seasons: 13 (2008/09–2020/21)
- Individual victories: 12
- All victories: 18
- Individual podiums: 26
- All podiums: 55
Medal record
Event	1st	2nd	3rd
Olympic Games	1	1	1
World Championships	4	2	2
Total	5	3	3
Olympic Games
Gold medal – first place	2014 Sochi	4 × 7.5 km relay
Silver medal – second place	2018 Pyeongchang	15 km mass start
Bronze medal – third place	2018 Pyeongchang	4 × 7.5 km relay
World Championships
Gold medal – first place	2010 Khanty-Mansiysk	Mixed relay
Gold medal – first place	2015 Kontiolahti	4 × 7.5 km relay
Gold medal – first place	2017 Hochfilzen	Mixed relay
Gold medal – first place	2017 Hochfilzen	15 km mass start
Silver medal – second place	2016 Oslo	Mixed relay
Silver medal – second place	2016 Oslo	4 × 7.5 km relay
Bronze medal – third place	2012 Ruhpolding	4 × 7.5 km relay
Bronze medal – third place	2013 Nové Město	4 × 7.5 km relay
Junior World Championships
Gold medal – first place	2007 Martell	4 × 7.5 km relay
Gold medal – first place	2009 Canmore	4 × 7.5 km relay
Silver medal – second place	2009 Canmore	12.5 km pursuit
Bronze medal – third place	2007 Martell	12.5 km pursuit
Bronze medal – third place	2008 Ruhpolding	4 × 7.5 km relay
European Championships
Gold medal – first place	2010 Otepää	4x7.5 km relay
Silver medal – second place	2009 Ufa	4x7.5 km relay

Simon Schempp (born 14 November 1988) is a German former biathlete.

== Career ==
In 2009, he made his World Cup debut. He became world champion by winning gold in the 15 km mass start race at the Biathlon World Championships 2017 in Hochfilzen. He also won three more gold medals, two for being part of the German Biathlon World Championships 2010 mixed relay team in Khanty-Mansiysk and the German Biathlon World Championships 2017 mixed relay team in Hochfilzen, and one gold medal as part of the German Biathlon World Championships 2015 men's relay team in Kontiolahti.

He also competed for Germany at the 2010 Winter Olympics, finishing fifth as part of the German team in the men's relay.

On 28 January 2021, he announced his retirement.

== Biathlon results ==
All results are sourced from the International Biathlon Union.

=== Olympic Games ===
3 medals (1 gold, 1 silver, 1 bronze)

Event	Individual	Sprint	Pursuit	Mass start	Relay	Mixed relay
(Canada) 2010 Vancouver	—	—	—	—	5th	—N/a
(Russia) 2014 Sochi	16th	15th	6th	13th	Gold	DSQ
(South Korea) 2018 Pyeongchang	36th	7th	5th	Silver	Bronze	

*The mixed relay was added as an event in 2014.

=== World Championships ===
8 medals (4 gold, 2 silver, 2 bronze)

Event	Individual	Sprint	Pursuit	Mass start	Relay	Mixed relay
(Russia) 2010 Khanty-Mansiysk	—N/a	—N/a	—N/a	—N/a	—N/a	Gold
(Germany) 2012 Ruhpolding	90th	19th	9th	26th	Bronze	—
(Czech Republic) 2013 Nové Město	—	28th	18th	14th	Bronze	13th
(Finland) 2015 Kontiolahti	8th	77th	—	8th	Gold	—
(Norway) 2016 Oslo	16th	8th	18th	19th	Silver	Silver
(Austria) 2017 Hochfilzen	13th	9th	10th	Gold	4th	Gold

*During Olympic seasons competitions are only held for those events not included in the Olympic program.

=== Junior/Youth World Championships ===
5 medals (2 gold, 1 silver, 2 bronze)

Event	Individual	Sprint	Pursuit	Relay
(Italy) 2007 Martell-Val Martello	5th	4th	Bronze	Gold
(Germany) 2008 Ruhpolding	9th	5th	5th	Bronze
(Canada) 2009 Canmore	5th	6th	Silver	Gold

=== World Cup ===
Season	Overall		Individual		Sprint		Pursuit		Mass start	
Season	Points	Position	Points	Position	Points	Position	Points	Position	Points	Position
2008–09	86	60th	17	59th	38	58th	31	54th	0	—N/a
2009–10	216	36th	0	—N/a	94	36th	122	13th	0	—N/a
2010–11	26	87th	13	60th	0	—N/a	13	70th	0	—N/a
2011–12	367	26th	59	16th	116	28th	132	21st	60	27th
2012–13	341	29th	6	63rd	127	27th	106	32nd	102	17th
2013–14	521	10th	32	26th	211	11th	218	6th	60	21st
2014–15	792	4th	64	14th	354	3rd	228	4th	146	7th
2015–16	769	4th	79	9th	316	2nd	251	6th	123	14th
2016–17	741	5th	68	13th	209	11th	233	6th	231	2nd
2017–18	484	12th	53	9th	212	7th	140	16th	79	25th
2018–19	134	44th	40	27th	29	56th	49	39th	16	40th
2019–20	119	41st	0	—N/a	53	44th	44	32nd	22	41st

=== Individual victories ===
12 victories (5 Sp, 4 Pu, 3 MS)

Season	Date	Location	Discipline	Level
2013–14; 2 victories (1 Sp, 1 Pu)	17 January 2014	(Italy) Antholz-Anterselva	10 km sprint	Biathlon World Cup
2013–14; 2 victories (1 Sp, 1 Pu)	18 January 2014	(Italy) Antholz-Anterselva	12.5 km pursuit	Biathlon World Cup
2014–15; 3 victories (1 Sp, 1 Pu, 1 MS)	18 January 2015	(Germany) Ruhpolding	15 km mass start	Biathlon World Cup
2014–15; 3 victories (1 Sp, 1 Pu, 1 MS)	22 January 2015	(Italy) Antholz-Anterselva	10 km sprint	Biathlon World Cup
2014–15; 3 victories (1 Sp, 1 Pu, 1 MS)	24 January 2015	(Italy) Antholz-Anterselva	12.5 km pursuit	Biathlon World Cup
2015–16; 5 victories (3 Sp, 2 Pu)	11 December 2015	(Austria) Hochfilzen	10 km sprint	Biathlon World Cup
2015–16; 5 victories (3 Sp, 2 Pu)	17 December 2015	(Slovenia) Pokljuka	10 km sprint	Biathlon World Cup
2015–16; 5 victories (3 Sp, 2 Pu)	19 December 2015	(Slovenia) Pokljuka	12.5 km pursuit	Biathlon World Cup
2015–16; 5 victories (3 Sp, 2 Pu)	22 January 2016	(Italy) Antholz-Anterselva	10 km sprint	Biathlon World Cup
2015–16; 5 victories (3 Sp, 2 Pu)	19 March 2016	(Russia) Khanty-Mansiysk	12.5 km pursuit	Biathlon World Cup
2016–17; 2 victory (2 MS)	8 January 2017	(Germany) Oberhof	15 km mass start	Biathlon World Cup
2016–17; 2 victory (2 MS)	19 February 2017	(Austria) Hochfilzen	15 km mass start	Biathlon World Championship

*Results are from UIPMB and IBU races which include the Biathlon World Cup, Biathlon World Championships and the Winter Olympic Games.
