= Jean-Guillaume Béatrix =

French biathlete (born 1988)

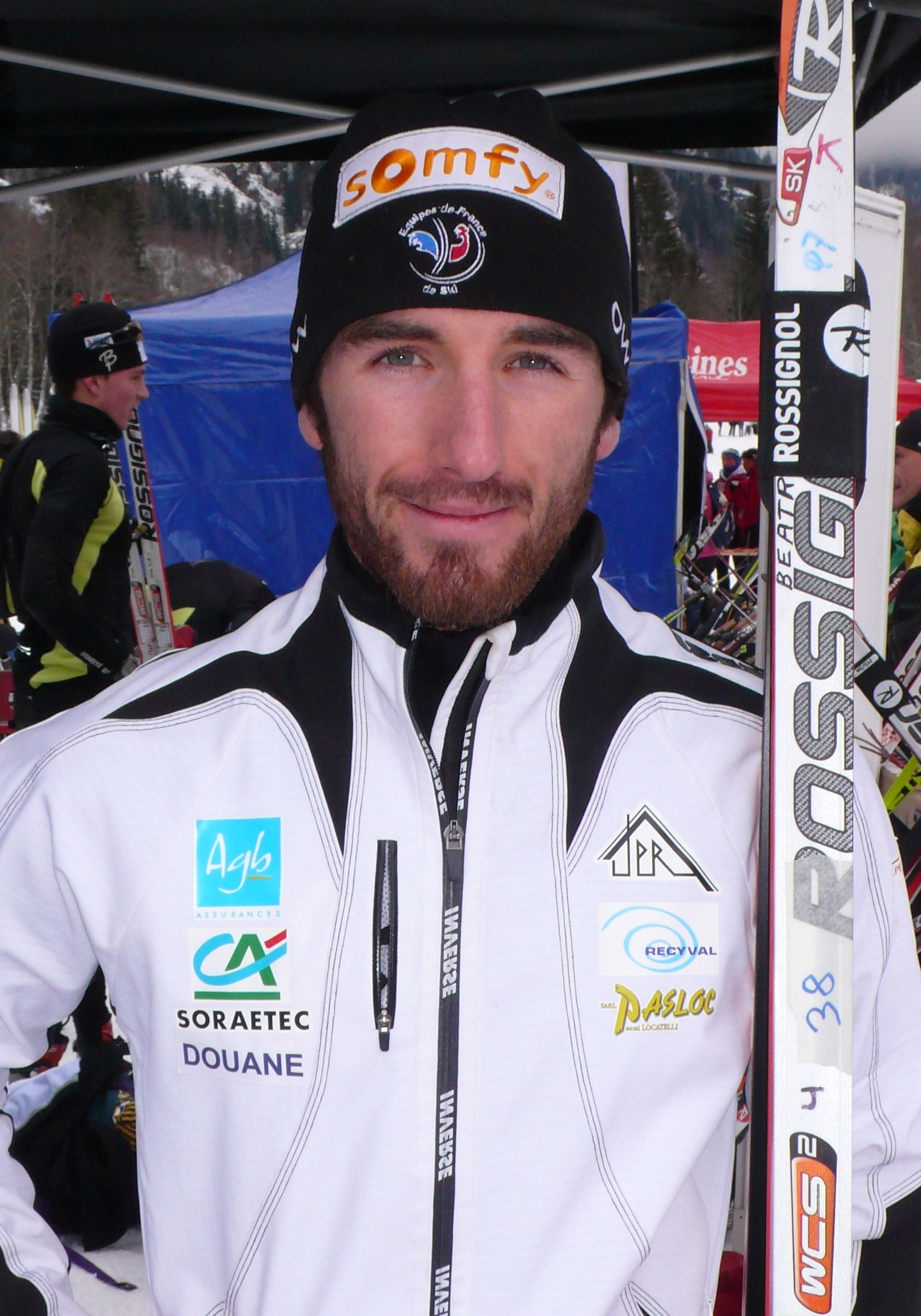

Personal information
- Born: 24 March 1988 (age 38) Saint-Priest, Metropolis of Lyon, France
- Height: 1.72 m (5 ft 8 in)

Sport

Professional information
- Sport: Biathlon

Olympic Games
- Teams: 1 (2014)
- Medals: 1

World Championships
- Teams: 5 (2012-2017)
- Medals: 5

World Cup
- Seasons: 11 (2007/08–2017/18)
- Individual victories: 1
- All victories: 8
Medal record
Olympic Games
Bronze medal – third place	2014 Sochi	12.5 km pursuit
World Championships
Silver medal – second place	2012 Ruhpolding	4 × 7.5 km relay
Silver medal – second place	2013 Nové Město	4 × 7.5 km relay
Silver medal – second place	2015 Kontiolahti	Mixed relay
Silver medal – second place	2017 Hochfilzen	4 × 7.5 km relay
Bronze medal – third place	2015 Kontiolahti	4 × 7.5 km relay
Junior World Championships
Gold medal – first place	2008 Ruhpolding	15 km individual
Youth World Championships
Bronze medal – third place	2007 Martell	12.5 km individual
Bronze medal – third place	2007 Martell	3 × 7.5 km relay
European Championships
Bronze medal – third place	2010 Otepää	4x7.5 km relay
Bronze medal – third place	2011 Ridnaun	12.5 km pursuit

Jean-Guillaume Béatrix (born 24 March 1988) is a retired French biathlete who has competed since 2005 till 2018. He was won the silver medal in the relay at the World Championships in 2012 and 2013, as well as the bronze in the Pursuit at the 2014 Olympics at Sochi. Béatrix has had four podium finishes in World Cup races in individual races.

== Career ==
=== Early career ===
Béatrix started competing in biathlon in 2005. He competed for France at the Junior World Championships where he won the Bronze in the individual race and the relay in 2007. He went on to become Junior World Champion in the Individual the following year.

== Biathlon results ==
=== Olympics ===
1 medal (1 bronze)

Event	Sprint	Pursuit	Individual	Mass start	Relay	Mixed relay
(Russia) 2014 Sochi	14th	Bronze	6th	17th	8th	5th

=== World Championships ===
5 medals (4 silver, 1 bronze)

Event	Sprint	Pursuit	Individual	Mass start	Relay	Mixed relay
(Germany) 2012 Ruhpolding	—	48th	46th	—	Silver	—
(Czech Republic) 2013 Nové Město	13th	20th	26th	7th	Silver	—
(Finland) 2015 Kontiolahti	57th	39th	41st	—	Bronze	Silver
(Norway) 2016 Oslo Holmenkollen	—	—	30th	—	—	—
(Austria) 2017 Hochfilzen	27th	13th	22nd	18th	Silver	—

=== World Cup ===
World Cup rankings

Season	Individual			Sprint			Pursuit			Mass Start			Total		
Season	Races	Points	Position	Races	Points	Position	Races	Points	Position	Races	Points	Position	Races	Points	Position
2007–08	0/4	—	—	1/10	—	—	0/7	—	—	0/5	—	—	1/26	—	—
2008–09	3/4	27	49th	5/10	16	78th	0/7	—	—	0/5	—	—	10/26	43	74th
2009–10	2/4	—	—	4/10	24	75th	0/6	—	—	0/5	—	—	6/25	24	84th
2010–11	1/4	—	—	6/10	49	54th	3/7	38	50th	1/5	20	49th	11/26	107	54th
2011–12	1/3	30	37th	8/10	122	27th	6/8	85	32nd	3/5	49	31st	18/26	286	29th
2012–13	3/3	52	16th	10/10	224	9th	8/8	179	13th	5/5	134	11th	26/26	589	13th
2013–14	2/2	16	37th	9/9	209	12th	7/8	160	15th	3/3	93	6th	21/22	478	13th
2014–15	3/3	20	41st	9/9	162	20th	6/6	121	16th	2/3	76	14th	20/21	379	21st

Statistics as of 15 March 2015. Season 2014–15 in progress.

Individual victories

1 victory

No.	Season	Date	Location	Discipline	Level
1	2015–16	19 December 2015	(Slovenia) Pokljuka	15 km Mass Start	Biathlon World Cup

Relay victories

7 victories

No.	Season	Date	Location	Discipline	Level	Team
1	2011–12	22 January 2012	(Italy) Antholz-Anterselva	Relay	Biathlon World Cup	Béatrix / S.Fourcade / Boeuf / Fourcade
2	2011–12	10 February 2012	(Finland) Kontiolahti	Mixed Relay	Biathlon World Cup	Boilley / Bescond / Béatrix / Jay
3	2012–13	10 January 2013	(Germany) Ruhpolding	Relay	Biathlon World Cup	S.Fourcade / Béatrix / Boeuf / Fourcade
4	2012–13	20 January 2013	(Italy) Antholz-Anterselva	Relay	Biathlon World Cup	S.Fourcade / Béatrix / Boeuf / Fourcade
5	2013–14	19 January 2014	(Italy) Antholz-Anterselva	Relay	Biathlon World Cup	S.Fourcade / Boeuf / Béatrix / Fourcade
6	2016–17	11 December 2016	(Slovenia) Pokljuka	Relay	Biathlon World Cup	Béatrix / Fillon Maillet / Desthieux / Fourcade
7	2016–17	5 March 2017	(South Korea) Pyeongchang	Relay	Biathlon World Cup	Béatrix / S.Fourcade / Desthieux / Fourcade

Podiums

Result	Individual	Sprint	Pursuit	Mass Start	Relay	Mixed Relay	Total		
Result	Individual	Sprint	Pursuit	Mass Start	Relay	Mixed Relay	Individual events	Team events	All events
1st place				1	4	1	1	5	6
2nd place			1		2	1	1	3	4
3rd place		1	1		5		2	5	7
Podiums		1	2	1	11	2	4	13	17
Top 10		7	6	5	18	4	18	22	40
