= Oleksander Zhyrnyi =

Russian and Ukrainian biathlete (born 1987)

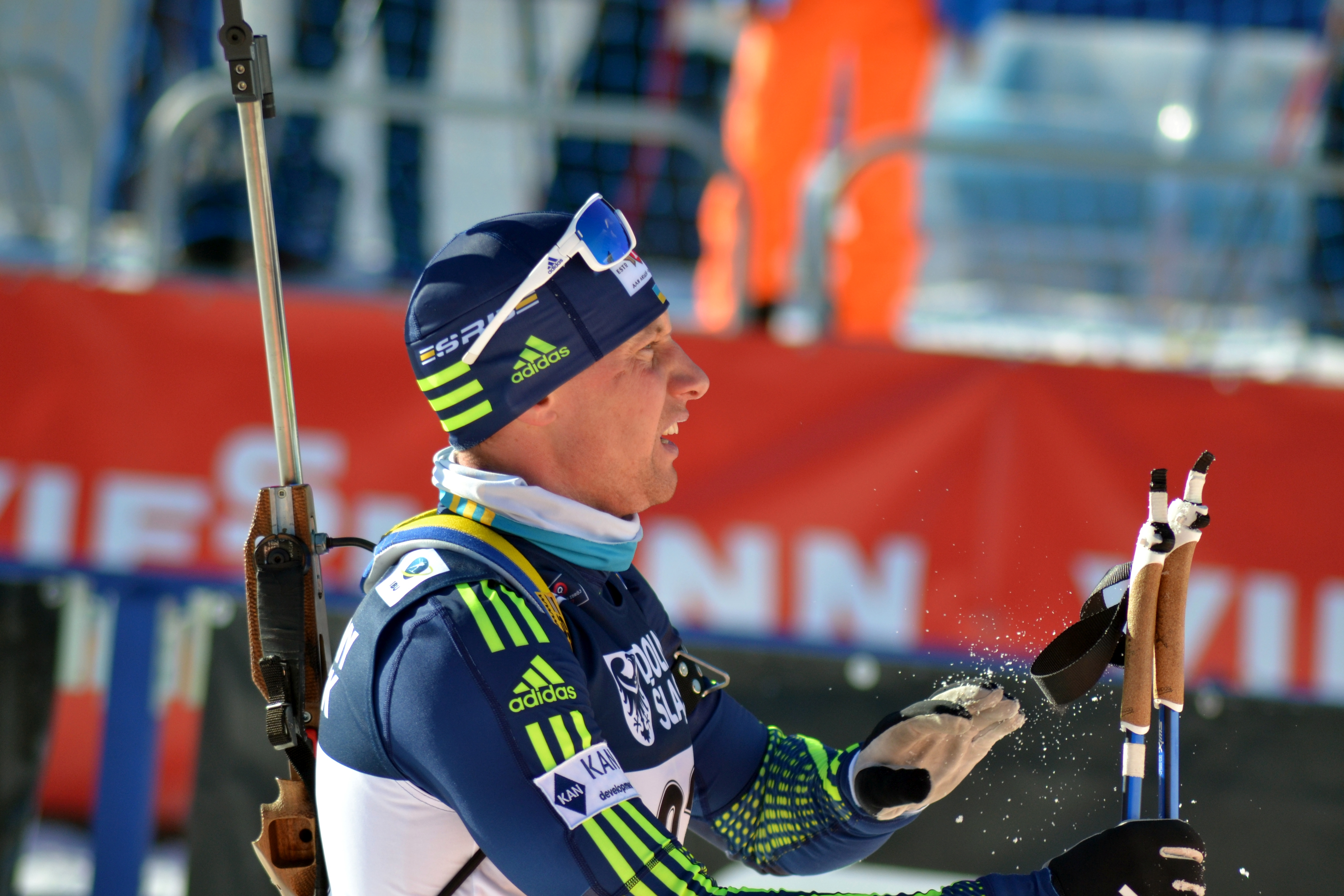

Personal information
- Full name: Oleksander Zhyrnyi
- Born: 25 February 1987 (age 39) Ufa, Russian SFSR
- Height: 180 cm (5 ft 11 in)
- Weight: 74 kg (163 lb)

Sport
- Sport: Skiing

World Cup career
- Seasons: Russia (until 2014 and since 2018); Ukraine (2014–2018)
Medal record
Men's biathlon
Representing Russia
European Championships (U21)
Bronze medal – third place	2012 Osrblie	Relay
Bronze medal – third place	2017 Duszniki-Zdrój	2x6 + 2x7.5 km Relay

Oleksander Zhyrnyi (born 25 February 1987) is a Russian (until 2014 and since 2018) and Ukrainian (2014–2018) biathlete.

== Career ==
He wasn't very successful in Russian team, so he moved to Ukraine in 2014. He made his World Cup debut at the 2014–15 in Östersund, Sweden, on 6 December 2014. After that he became a regular member of Ukrainian team.

He moved back to Russia in the summer of 2018.

== Performances ==
Level	Year	Event	IN	SP	PU	MS	RL	MRL
EBCH (RUS)	2012	Osrblie, Slovakia	13				3	
EBCH (UKR)	2015	Otepää, Estonia		32	34			
BWCH (UKR)	2015	Kontiolahti, Finland		48	44		9	

Notes

- (RUS) – as a representer of Russia
- (UKR) – as a representer of Ukraine

=== World Cup ===
==== Positions ====
Season	Individual	Sprint	Pursuit	Mass starts	Total
2014–15	59	79	72		78
