= Lee-Steve Jackson =

English biathlete (born 1980)

Lee Steve Jackson
Personal information
- Full name: Lee Steve Jackson
- Born: 20 April 1980 (age 46) Norton, Stockton-on-Tees, England, United Kingdom
- Height: 1.72 m (5 ft 8 in)

Sport

Professional information
- Sport: Biathlon
- World Cup debut: 5 December 2002

Olympic Games
- Teams: 2 (2010, 2014)
- Medals: 0

World Championships
- Teams: 9 (2004, 2005, 2007, 2008, 2009, 2011, 2012, 2013, 2015)
- Medals: 0

World Cup
- Seasons: 13 (2002/03–2014/15)
- All victories: 0
- All podiums: 0

Lee Steve Jackson (born 20 April 1980) is an English former biathlete.

== Career ==
He originally started competing in the sport whilst serving in the military.

Born in Stockton-on-Tees, Jackson joined the Royal Artillery in 1999 and currently holds the rank of bombardier in 16 Regiment RA. He competed in the 2010 Winter Olympics for Great Britain. His best finish was 55th, in the sprint. He also finished 56th in the pursuit and 66th in the individual

His best performance at the Biathlon World Championships was 19th, in the 2011 mixed relay. His best solo performance in a World Championships was 39th, in the 2015 individual race. The World Championships also count towards the Biathlon World Cup, making this his best solo World Cup result as well.

His best Biathlon World Cup finish was 16th, achieved in two men's relay events.

Despite the fact that his forenames are usually hyphenated in official results, and by the British Biathlon Union, there is actually no hyphen in Jackson's name – this anomaly came about when his coach first entered him in international competition and added the hyphen between his first and middle names.

Jackson retired after the 2014–15 season.

== Biathlon results ==
All results are sourced from the International Biathlon Union.

=== Olympic Games ===
Event	Individual	Sprint	Pursuit	Mass start	Relay	Mixed relay
(Canada) 2010 Vancouver	66th	55th	56th	—	—	—N/a
(Russia) 2014 Sochi	41st	66th	—	—	—	—

*The mixed relay was added as an event in 2014.

=== World Championships ===
Event	Individual	Sprint	Pursuit	Mass start	Relay	Mixed relay
(Germany) 2004 Oberhof	102nd	—	—	—	DNF	—N/a
(Austria) 2005 Hochfilzen	99th	68th	—	—	20th	—
(Italy) 2007 Antholz-Anterselva	75th	75th	—	—	21st	—
(Sweden) 2008 Östersund	94th	79th	—	—	23rd	—
(South Korea) 2009 Pyeongchang	—	DNF	—	—	25th	—
(Russia) 2011 Khanty-Mansiysk	47th	48th	47th	—	23rd	19th
(Germany) 2012 Ruhpolding	109th	88th	—	—	28th	24th
(Czech Republic) 2013 Nové Město	86th	105th	—	—	22nd	25th
(Finland) 2015 Kontiolahti	39th	79th	—	—	24th	25th

*During Olympic seasons competitions are only held for those events not included in the Olympic program.
**Mixed relay was added as an event in 2005.
