= Vassiliy Podkorytov =

Kazakhstani biathlete (born 1994)

Personal information
- Nationality: Kazakhstani
- Born: 11 January 1994 (age 32)

Sport
- Sport: Biathlon
Medal record
Men's biathlon
Representing Kazakhstan
Asian Winter Games
Silver medal – second place	2017 Sapporo	10 km sprint
Silver medal – second place	2017 Sapporo	Mixed relay

Vassiliy Podkorytov (born 11 January 1994) is a Kazakhstani biathlete. He competed in the 2018 Winter Olympics.

== Biathlon results ==
All results are sourced from the International Biathlon Union.

=== Olympic Games ===
0 medals

Event	Individual	Sprint	Pursuit	Mass start	Relay	Mixed relay
(South Korea) 2018 Pyeongchang	62nd	80th	—	—	17th	—

=== World Championships ===
0 medals

Event	Individual	Sprint	Pursuit	Mass start	Relay	Mixed relay
(Finland) 2015 Kontiolahti	76th	113th	—	—	17th	—
(Norway) 2016 Oslo	67th	72nd	—	—	20th	—
(Austria) 2017 Hochfilzen	67th	—	—	—	14th	—

*During Olympic seasons competitions are only held for those events not included in the Olympic program.
