= Yan Savitskiy =

Kazakhstani biathlete (born 1987)

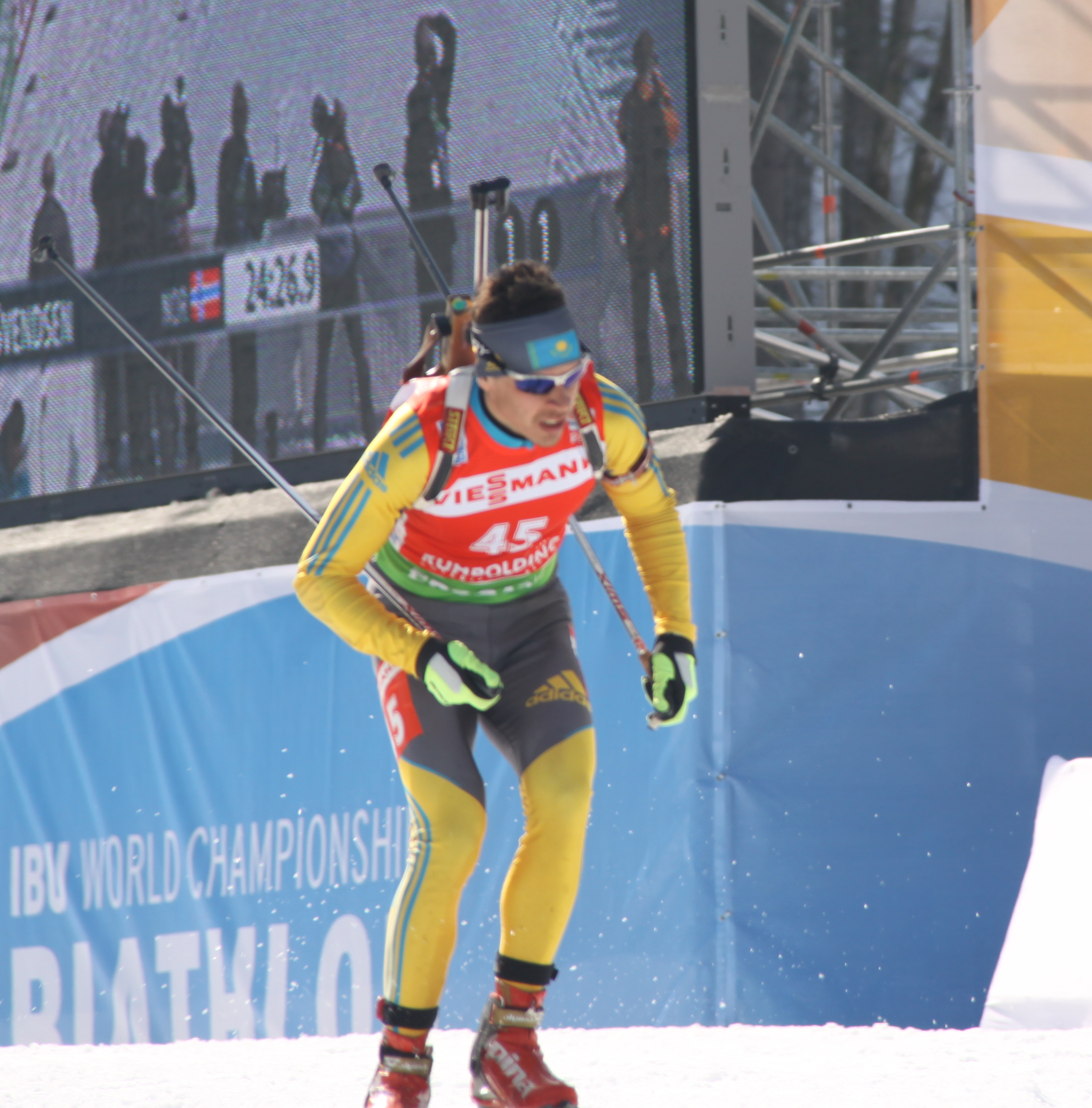

Personal information
- Born: April 29, 1987 (age 39) Ridder, Kazakh SSR
- Height: 175 cm (5 ft 9 in)

Sport
- Sport: Skiing
Medal record
Men's biathlon
Representing Kazakhstan
Asian Winter Games
| Gold medal – first place | 2011 Astana-Almaty | 4×7.5 km relay |
| Gold medal – first place | 2017 Sapporo | 10 km sprint |
| Gold medal – first place | 2017 Sapporo | 15 km mass start |
| Gold medal – first place | 2017 Sapporo | Mixed relay |
| Silver medal – second place | 2017 Sapporo | 12.5 km pursuit |
- Updated on February 28, 2013

Yan Savitskiy (born April 29, 1987, in Ridder, Kazakhstan) is a Kazakh biathlete.

He competed in the 2010 Winter Olympics for Belarus. His best finish is 18th, as a member of the Kazakh relay team. His best individual performance is 27th, in the pursuit.

As of February 2013, his best performance at the Biathlon World Championships, is 11th, in the 2013 individual.

As of February 2013, his best Biathlon World Cup finish is 14th, in the men's relay at Antholz in 2010/11. His best individual finish is 16th, in the sprint at Antholz in 2012/13. His best overall finish in the Biathlon World Cup is 70th, in 2011/12.
