= Mikito Tachizaki =

Japanese biathlete (born 1988)

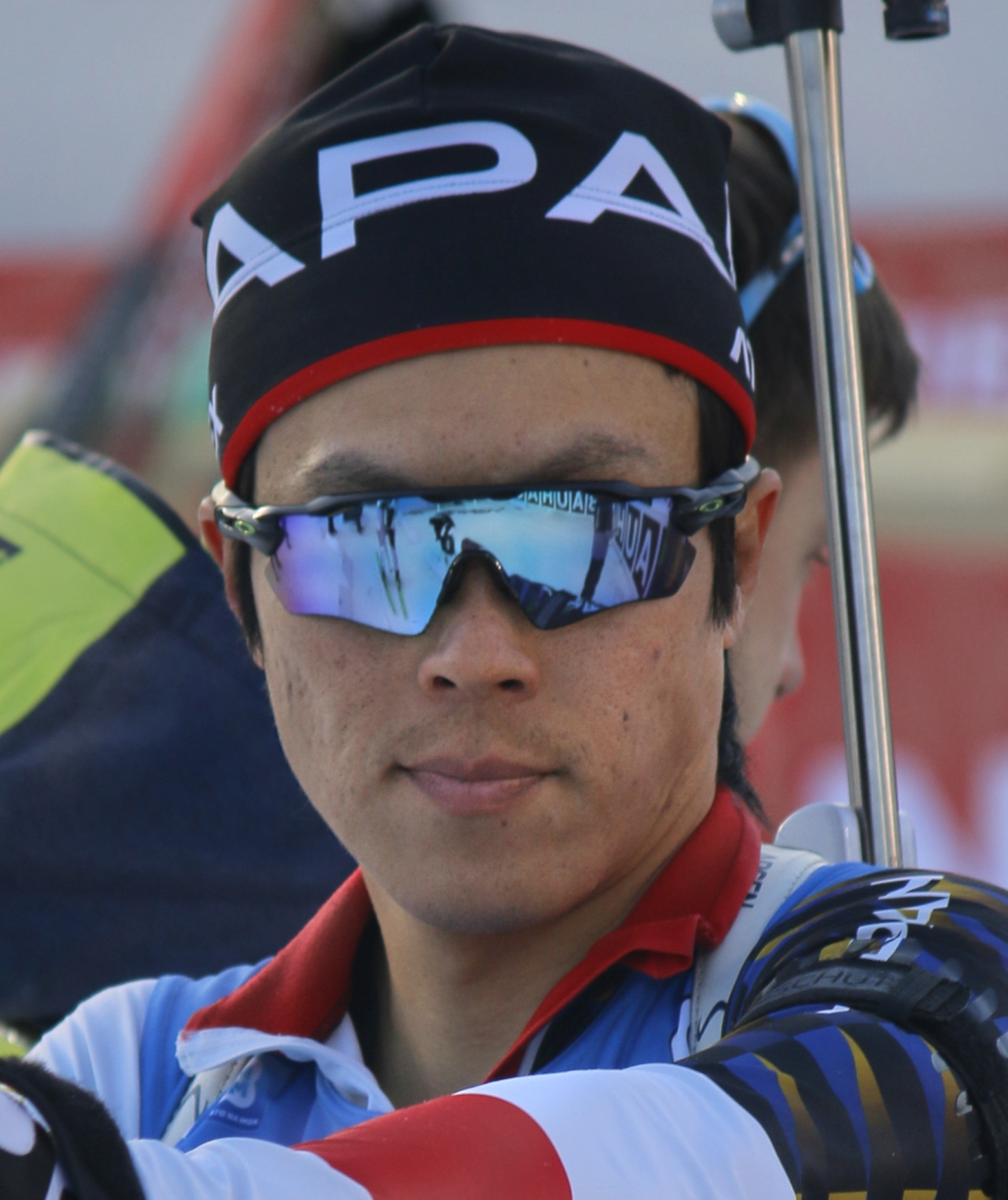
- Tachizaki in Nové Město in 2023

Personal information
- Nationality: Japanese
- Born: 17 May 1988 (age 38)
- Height: 172 cm (5 ft 8 in)
- Weight: 70 kg (154 lb)

Sport
- Sport: Biathlon
Medal record
Men's biathlon
Representing Japan
Asian Winter Games
Gold medal – first place	2017 Sapporo	12.5 km pursuit
Bronze medal – third place	2017 Sapporo	10 km sprint
Bronze medal – third place	2017 Sapporo	Mixed relay
Gold medal – first place	2025 Harbin	Relay

Mikito Tachizaki (立崎 幹人, Tachizaki Mikito; born 17 May 1988) is a Japanese biathlete. He competed in the 2018 Winter Olympics. He serves in the Japan Self-Defense Forces and is married to fellow biathlete Fuyuko Tachizaki.

== Career results ==
=== Olympic Games ===
0 medals

Event	Individual	Sprint	Pursuit	Mass start	Relay	Mixed relay
(South Korea) 2018 Pyeongchang	64th	84th	—	—	—	—

=== World Championships ===
0 medals

Event	Individual	Sprint	Pursuit	Mass start	Relay	Mixed relay	Single mixed relay
(Austria) 2017 Hochfilzen	74th	67th	—	—	15th	15th	—
(Sweden) 2019 Östersund	—	60th	55th	—	20th	—	17th
(Italy) 2020 Antholz	45th	82nd	—	—	20th	20th	13th
(Slovenia) 2021 Pokljuka	—	—	—	—	18th	20th	18th
(Germany) 2023 Oberhof	62nd	62nd	—	—	21st	19th	22nd
(Czech Republic) 2024 Nové Město na Moravě	56th	66th	—	—	—	24th	26th
