= Nathan Smith (biathlete) =

Canadian biathlete

Personal information
- Full name: Nathan Smith
- Born: 25 December 1985 (age 40) Calgary, Alberta, Canada
- Height: 1.76 m (5 ft 9 in)

Sport

Professional information
- Sport: Biathlon
- World Cup debut: 4 January 2007

Olympic Games
- Teams: 2 (2014)(2018)
- Medals: 0

World Championships
- Teams: 6 (2008, 2011, 2012, 2013, 2015, 2016)
- Medals: 2

World Cup
- Seasons: 10 (2006/07–)
- Individual victories: 1
- All victories: 1
- Individual podiums: 5
- All podiums: 5
Medal record
World Championships
Silver medal – second place	2015 Kontiolahti	10 km sprint
Bronze medal – third place	2016 Oslo	4 × 7.5 km relay
Junior World Championships
Bronze medal – third place	2005 Kontiolahti	4 × 7.5 km relay
- Updated on 22 March 2015

Nathan Smith (born 25 December 1985) is a Canadian biathlete.

== Career ==
Smith competed for Canada at the 2014 Winter Olympics.

At the 2015 Biathlon World Championships in Kontiolahti, Finland in the 10 km Sprint event Nathan won Silver. He was the first Canadian male biathlete to medal at a World Championship.

At the 2015 Biathlon World Cup event in Khanty-Mansiysk, Russia Nathan Smith won the first biathlon World Cup gold medal of his career in the Men's 12.5 km pursuit race.

At the Nov. 29, 2015 IBU World Cup in Ostersund, Sweden Canada's Rosanna Crawford and Nathan Smith teamed up to win the silver medal in the season-opening single mixed relay. The top five results in this race were as follows: 1. Norway, 36:27.3; 2. Canada (Rosanna Crawford/Canmore, Alta., Nathan Smith/Calgary), 36:39.2; 3. Germany, 36:40.5; 4. Sweden, 36:51.7; 5. Russia, 37:09.1

At the 2016 Biathlon World Championships in Holmenkollen, Norway on March 12 Nathan Smith teamed up with Christian Gow, Scott Gow, and Brendan Green to win the bronze medal in the men's relay.

=== 2018 Winter Olympics ===
In January 2018, Smith was named to Canada's 2018 Olympic team.

== Biathlon results ==
All results are sourced from the International Biathlon Union.

=== Olympic Games ===
0 medals

Event	Individual	Sprint	Pursuit	Mass start	Relay	Mixed relay
(Russia) 2014 Sochi	25th	13th	11th	dnf	7th	—
(South Korea) 2018 Pyeongchang	81st	44th	54th	—	—	—

*The mixed relay was added as an event in 2014.

=== World Championships ===
2 medals (1 silver, 1 bronze)

Event	Individual	Sprint	Pursuit	Mass start	Relay	Mixed relay
(Sweden) 2008 Östersund	81st	92nd	—	—	21st	—
(Russia) 2011 Khanty-Mansiysk	85th	67th	—	—	11th	—
(Germany) 2012 Ruhpolding	61st	45th	43rd	—	13th	18th
(Czech Republic) 2013 Nové Město	62nd	72nd	—	—	8th	—
(Finland) 2015 Kontiolahti	44th	Silver	13th	23rd	19th	12th
(Norway) 2016 Oslo Holmenkollen	42nd	46th	25th	—	Bronze	11th

*During Olympic seasons competitions are only held for those events not included in the Olympic program.

**The mixed relay was added as an event in 2005.
