= Klemen Bauer =

Slovenian biathlete (born 1986)

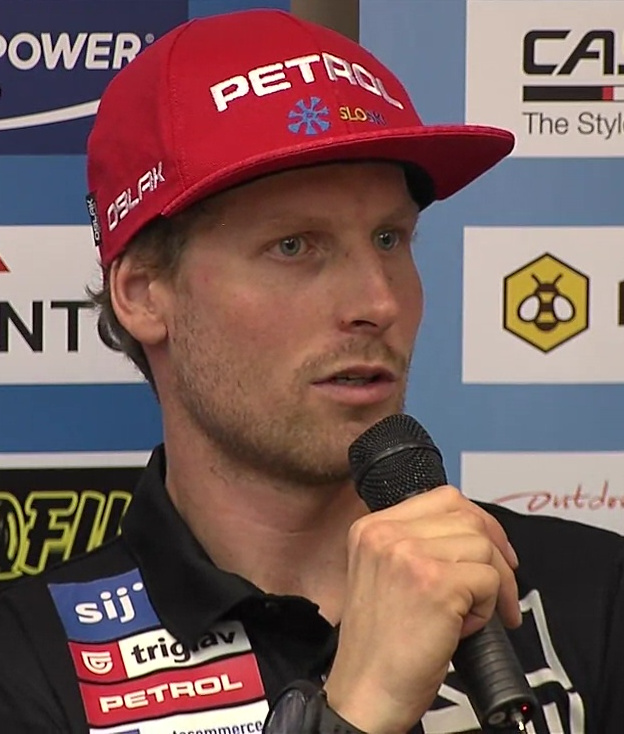

Personal information
- Born: 9 January 1986 (age 40)
- Height: 6 ft 0 in (183 cm)
- Weight: 170 lb (77 kg)

Sport
- Country: Slovenia
- Sport: Biathlon
Medal record
Representing Slovenia
World Championships
Silver medal – second place	2012 Ruhpolding	Mixed relay
Junior World Championships
Bronze medal – third place	2007 Martell	15 km individual
Youth World Championships
Silver medal – second place	2004 Haute Maurienne	7.5 km sprint
Silver medal – second place	2005 Kontiolahti	7.5 km sprint
Bronze medal – third place	2004 Haute Maurienne	12.5 km individual
Bronze medal – third place	2004 Haute Maurienne	3 × 7.5 km relay

Klemen Bauer (born 9 January 1986 in Ljubljana, Slovenia) is a former Slovenian biathlete.

Bauer represented Slovenia at the 2006 and 2010 Winter Olympics, finishing 4th in the sprint event. At the 2012 World Championships, Bauer won the silver medal in the mixed relay, with Andreja Mali, Teja Gregorin and Jakov Fak.

== Biathlon results ==
All results are sourced from the International Biathlon Union.

=== Olympic Games ===
0 medals

Event	Individual	Sprint	Pursuit	Mass start	Relay	Mixed relay
(Italy) 2006 Turin	60th	69th	—	—	10th	—
(Canada) 2010 Vancouver	32nd	4th	9th	28th	17th	—
(Russia) 2014 Sochi	51st	56th	24th	—	6th	—
(South Korea) 2018 Pyeongchang	15th	26th	24th	20th	10th	14th

*The mixed relay was added as an event in 2014.

=== World Championships ===
1 medal (1 silver)

Event	Individual	Sprint	Pursuit	Mass start	Relay	Mixed relay	Single Mixed relay
(Slovenia) 2006 Pokljuka	—	—	—	—	—	5th	—N/a
(Italy) 2007 Antholz	79th	31st	45th	—	19th	4th	—N/a
(Sweden) 2008 Östersund	64th	59th	44th	—	19th	9th	—N/a
(South Korea) 2009 Pyeongchang	53rd	13th	11th	14th	15th	12th	—N/a
(Russia) 2010 Khanty-Mansiysk	—N/a	—N/a	—N/a	—N/a	—N/a	10th	—N/a
(Russia) 2011 Khanty-Mansiysk	40th	15th	34th	19th	8th	16th	—N/a
(Germany) 2012 Ruhpolding	5th	44th	32nd	21st	14th	2nd	—N/a
(Czech Republic) 2013 Nové Město	DNF	21st	24th	26th	13th	5th	—N/a
(Finland) 2015 Kontiolahti	23rd	45th	39th	—	8th	15th	—N/a
(Norway) 2016 Oslo Holmenkollen	—	50th	56th	—	17th	13th	—N/a
(Austria) 2017 Hochfilzen	88th	33rd	16th	17th	18th	18th	—N/a
(Slovenia) 2021 Pokljuka	—	54th	LPD	—	—	16th	—

*During Olympic seasons, competitions are only held for those events not included in the Olympic program.
**The mixed relay was added as an event in 2005.
