= Yuryi Liadov =

Belarusian biathlete (born 1987)

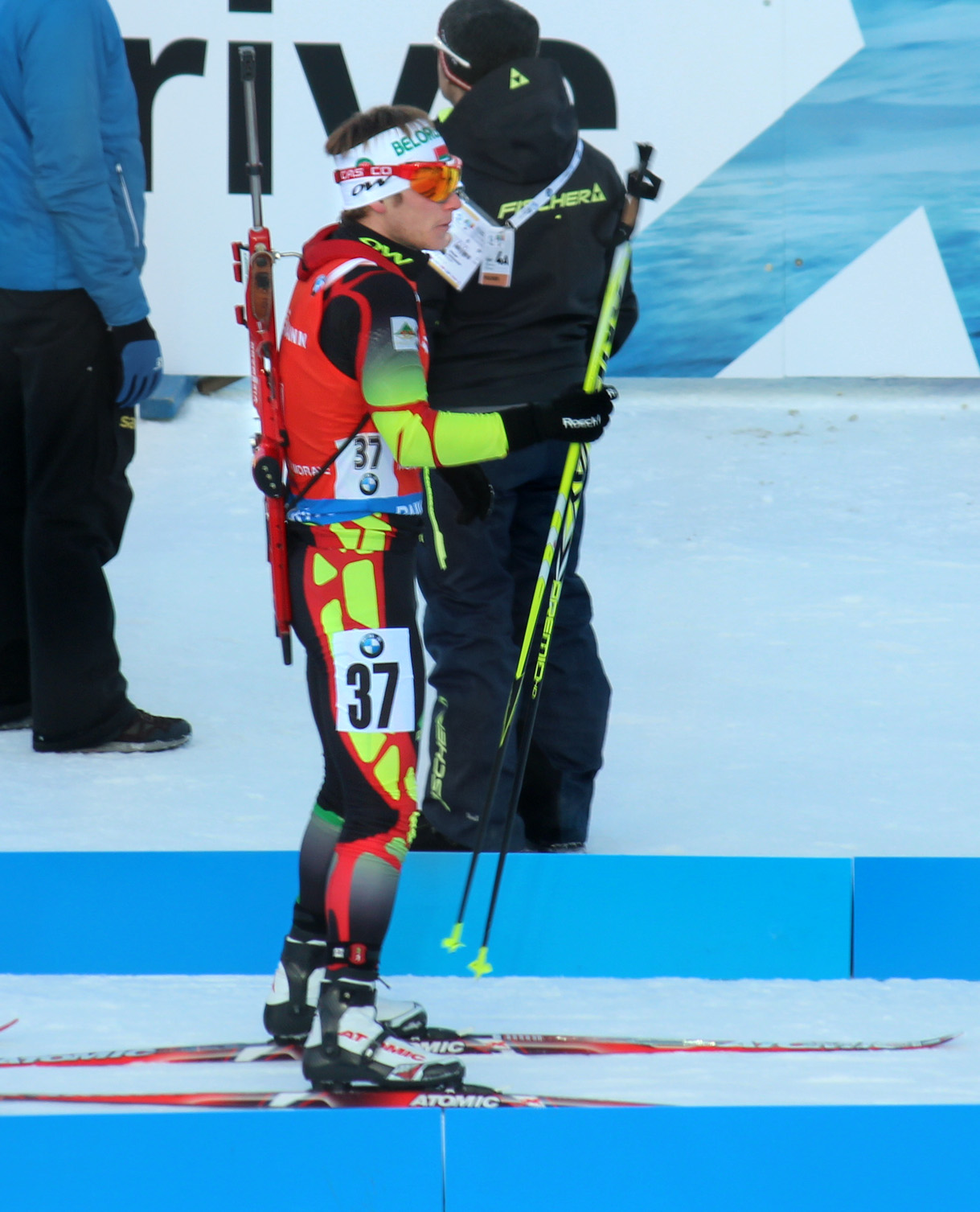
- Yuryi Liadov, Nové Město 2015

Personal information
- Nationality: Belarusian
- Born: 3 December 1987 (age 38) Minsk, Belarus SSR

Sport
- Sport: Biathlon
Medal record
Youth World Championships
Bronze medal – third place	2006 Presque Isle	3 × 7.5 km relay

Yuryi Liadov (Belarusian: Юрый Лядаў; born 3 December 1987) is a Belarusian biathlete. He was born in Minsk. He competed at the Biathlon World Championships 2012 and 2013, and at the 2014 Winter Olympics in Sochi, in sprint and pursuit.
