= Maxim Braun =

Kazakhstani biathlete (born 1993)

Personal information
- Born: 16 April 1993 (age 33) Pavlodar, Kazakhstan

Sport
- Sport: Biathlon
Medal record
Men's biathlon
Representing Kazakhstan
Asian Winter Games
Gold medal – first place	2017 Sapporo	Mixed relay

Maxim Braun (born 16 April 1993) is a Kazakhstani biathlete. He competed in the 2018 Winter Olympics.

== Biathlon results ==
All results are sourced from the International Biathlon Union.

=== Olympic Games ===
0 medals

Event	Individual	Sprint	Pursuit	Mass start	Relay	Mixed relay
(South Korea) 2018 Pyeongchang	61st	85th	—	—	17th	18th

=== World Championships ===
0 medals

Event	Individual	Sprint	Pursuit	Mass start	Relay	Mixed relay
(Finland) 2015 Kontiolahti	53rd	86th	—	—	17th	24th
(Norway) 2016 Oslo	—	77th	—	—	20th	—
(Austria) 2017 Hochfilzen	—	63rd	—	—	14th	11th

*During Olympic seasons competitions are only held for those events not included in the Olympic program.
