= Biathlon World Championships 2017 =

49th edition of the Biathlon World Championships

- Host city: Hochfilzen
- Country: Austria
- Events: 11
- Opening: 9 February
- Closing: 19 February

The 49th Biathlon World Championships was held from 9 to 19 February 2017 in Hochfilzen, Austria. There were a total of 11 competitions: sprint, pursuit, individual, mass start, and relay races for men and women, and mixed relay. All the events during this championships also count for the Biathlon World Cup season.

== Host selection ==
The second candidate city was Östersund, Sweden. Hochfilzen was selected as the host city on September 2, 2012 during the X IBU Congress in Merano, Italy (27 to 20 votes). This will be fourth time when World Championships will be held in Hochfilzen; the city had previously hosted the event in 1978, 1998 and 2005.

== Schedule ==
All times are local (UTC+1).

Date	Time	Event
9 February	14:45	2 × 6 km + 2 × 7.5 km Mixed Relay
10 February	14:45	Women's 7.5 km Sprint
11 February	14:45	Men's 10 km Sprint
12 February	10:30	Women's 10 km Pursuit
12 February	14:45	Men's 12.5 km Pursuit
15 February	14:30	Women's 15 km Individual
16 February	14:30	Men's 20 km Individual
17 February	14:45	Women's 4 × 6 km Relay
18 February	14:45	Men's 4 × 7.5 km Relay
19 February	11:30	Women's 12.5 km Mass Start
19 February	14:45	Men's 15 km Mass Start

== Medal summary ==
=== Medal table ===
Rank	Nation	Gold	Silver	Bronze	Total
1	Germany (GER)	7	1	0	8
2	France (FRA)	1	2	4	7
3	Czech Republic (CZE)	1	2	1	4
4	United States (USA)	1	1	0	2
5	Russia (RUS)	1	0	1	2
6	Norway (NOR)	0	3	1	4
7	Belarus (BLR)	0	1	0	1
7	Ukraine (UKR)	0	1	0	1
9	Austria (AUT)	0	0	2	2
10	Finland (FIN)	0	0	1	1
10	Italy (ITA)	0	0	1	1
Totals (11 entries)		11	11	11	33

=== Top athletes ===
All athletes with two or more medals.

Rank	Nation	Gold	Silver	Bronze	Total
1	Laura Dahlmeier (GER)	5	1	0	6
2	Simon Schempp (GER)	2	0	0	2
2	Vanessa Hinz (GER)	2	0	0	2
4	Martin Fourcade (FRA)	1	2	2	5
5	Gabriela Koukalová (CZE)	1	1	1	3
6	Anton Shipulin (RUS)	1	0	1	2
7	Johannes Thingnes Bø (NOR)	0	3	0	3
8	Quentin Fillon Maillet (FRA)	0	2	0	2
9	Anaïs Chevalier (FRA)	0	1	2	3
10	Marie Dorin Habert (FRA)	0	1	1	2
11	Simon Eder (AUT)	0	0	2	2

=== Men ===
Event	Gold		Silver		Bronze	
10 km sprint	Benedikt Doll; Germany	23:27.4 (0+0)	Johannes Thingnes Bø; Norway	23:28.1 (0+0)	Martin Fourcade; France	23:50.5 (1+1)
12.5 km pursuit	Martin Fourcade; France	30:16.9 (0+0+0+1)	Johannes Thingnes Bø; Norway	30:39.7 (1+1+1+0)	Ole Einar Bjørndalen; Norway	30:42.5 (0+0+0+1)
20 km individual	Lowell Bailey; United States	48:07.4 (0+0+0+0)	Ondřej Moravec; Czech Republic	48:10.7 (0+0+0+0)	Martin Fourcade; France	48:28.6 (1+0+1+0)
4 × 7.5 km relay	Russia Alexey Volkov; Maxim Tsvetkov; Anton Babikov; Anton Shipulin	1:14:15.0 (0+1) (0+1) (0+0) (0+0) (0+0) (0+0) (0+0) (0+1)	France Jean-Guillaume Béatrix; Quentin Fillon Maillet; Simon Desthieux; Martin Fourcade	1:14:20.8 (0+0) (0+0) (0+1) (0+0) (0+3) (0+0) (0+0) (0+0)	Austria Daniel Mesotitsch; Julian Eberhard; Simon Eder; Dominik Landertinger	1:14:35.1 (0+0) (0+1) (0+2) (0+2) (0+1) (0+2) (0+1) (0+1)
15 km mass start	Simon Schempp; Germany	35:38.3 (0+0+0+0)	Johannes Thingnes Bø; Norway	35:47.3 (0+0+0+1)	Simon Eder; Austria	35:48.4 (0+0+0+0)

=== Women ===
Event	Gold		Silver		Bronze	
7.5 km sprint	Gabriela Koukalová; Czech Republic	19:12.6 (0+0)	Laura Dahlmeier; Germany	19:16.6 (0+0)	Anaïs Chevalier; France	19:37.7 (0+0)
10 km pursuit	Laura Dahlmeier; Germany	28:02.3 (1+0+0+0)	Darya Domracheva; Belarus	28:13.9 (0+0+0+0)	Gabriela Koukalová; Czech Republic	28:18.9 (2+0+1+0)
15 km individual	Laura Dahlmeier; Germany	41:30.1 (1+0+0+0)	Gabriela Koukalová; Czech Republic	41:54.8 (1+0+0+0)	Alexia Runggaldier; Italy	43:15.7 (0+0+0+0)
4 × 6 km relay	Germany Vanessa Hinz; Maren Hammerschmidt; Franziska Hildebrand; Laura Dahlmeier	1:11:16.6 (0+0) (0+2) (0+1) (0+3) (0+0) (0+0) (0+1) (0+2)	Ukraine Iryna Varvynets; Yuliia Dzhima; Anastasiya Merkushyna; Olena Pidhrushna	1:11:23.0 (0+0) (0+1) (0+1) (0+1) (0+1) (0+0) (0+0) (0+0)	France Anaïs Chevalier; Célia Aymonier; Justine Braisaz; Marie Dorin Habert	1:11:24.7 (0+0) (0+1) (0+0) (0+3) (0+3) (0+0) (0+0) (0+0)
12.5 km mass start	Laura Dahlmeier; Germany	33:13.8 (0+0+0+0)	Susan Dunklee; United States	33:18.4 (0+0+0+0)	Kaisa Mäkäräinen; Finland	33:33.9 (1+0+0+0)

=== Mixed ===
Event	Gold		Silver		Bronze	
2 × 6 + 2 × 7.5 km W+M relay	Germany Vanessa Hinz; Laura Dahlmeier; Arnd Peiffer; Simon Schempp	1:09:06.4 (0+0) (0+2) (0+2) (0+2) (0+0) (0+0) (0+0) (0+1)	France Anaïs Chevalier; Marie Dorin Habert; Quentin Fillon Maillet; Martin Fourcade	1:09:08.6 (0+0) (0+2) (0+0) (0+2) (0+1) (1+3) (0+0) (0+0)	Russia Olga Podchufarova; Tatiana Akimova; Alexander Loginov; Anton Shipulin	1:09:09.6 (0+0) (0+0) (0+1) (0+0) (0+0) (0+3) (0+0) (0+0)
