= 2012–13 Biathlon World Cup – Pursuit Women =

The 2012–13 Biathlon World Cup – Pursuit Women will start at Sunday December 2, 2012 in Östersund and will finish Saturday March 16, 2013 in Khanty-Mansiysk. Defending titlist is Darya Domracheva of Belarus.

== Competition format ==
This is a pursuit competition. The biathletes' starts are separated by their time differences from a previous race, most commonly a sprint race. The contestants ski a distance of 10 kilometres (6.2 mi) over five laps. On four of the laps, the contestants shoot at targets; each miss requires the contestant to ski a penalty loop of 150 metres (490 ft). There are two prone shooting bouts and two standing bouts, in that order. The contestant crossing the finish line first is the winner.

To prevent awkward and/or dangerous crowding of the skiing loops, and overcapacity at the shooting range, World Cup Pursuits are held with only the 60 top ranking biathletes after the preceding race. The biathletes shoot (on a first-come, first-served basis) at the lane corresponding to the position they arrived for all shooting bouts.

Points are awarded for each event, according to each contestant's finish. When all events are completed. the contestant with the highest number of points is declared the season winner.

== 2011-12 Top 3 Standings ==
Medal	Athlete	Points
Gold:	(Belarus) Darya Domracheva	392
Silver:	(Germany) Magdalena Neuner	372
Bronze:	(Norway) Tora Berger	361

== Medal winners ==
Event:	Gold:	Time	Silver:	Time	Bronze:	Time
Östersund details	Tora Berger; Norway	31:01.9 (0+0+0+1)	Darya Domracheva; Belarus	31:31.7 (0+0+1+0)	Andrea Henkel; Germany	31:53.4 (0+0+0+0)
Hochfilzen details	Synnøve Solemdal; Norway	31:13.4 (1+0+0+0)	Tora Berger; Norway	31:43.6 (0+1+1+0)	Kaisa Mäkäräinen; Finland	31:46.7 (0+0+2+2)
Pokljuka details	Miriam Gössner; Germany	31:47.8 (2+1+1+1)	Gabriela Soukalová; Czech Republic	31:48.5 (0+0+0+0)	Marie Dorin Habert; France	32:14.3 (0+1+0+0)
Oberhof details	Olga Zaitseva; Russia	32:01.9 (0+2+1+0)	Veronika Vítková; Czech Republic	32:27.8 (1+0+0+0)	Valj Semerenko; Ukraine	32:30.3 (0+1+0+0)
Antholz details	Tora Berger; Norway	31:21.8 (0+1+1+0)	Olena Pidhrushna; Ukraine	31:40.7 (0+0+0+1)	Kaisa Mäkäräinen; Finland	31:47.2 (0+0+2+2)
Biathlon World Championships 2013 details	Tora Berger; Norway	28:48.4 (0+1+2+0)	Krystyna Pałka; Poland	29:06.9 (0+0+1+1)	Olena Pidhrushna; Ukraine	29:09.9 (0+0+2+0)
Holmenkollen details	Tora Berger; Norway	32:12.2 (0+1+2+1)	Marie Dorin Habert; France	32:43.4 (0+0+1+1)	Anastasiya Kuzmina; Slovakia	32:57.3 (1+0+2+1)
Khanty-Mansiysk details	Gabriela Soukalová; Czech Republic	30:58.8 (0+1+0+1)	Olga Vilukhina; Russia	31:05.8 (0+1+2+0)	Tora Berger; Norway	31:13.6 (1+0+0+1)

== Standings ==
#	Name	ÖST	HOC	POK	OBE	ANT	WCH	HOL	KHA	Total
1	Tora Berger (NOR)	60	54	32	43	60	60	60	48	417
2	Andrea Henkel (GER)	48	24	36	36	29	38	32	36	279
3	Marie Dorin Habert (FRA)	24	36	48	32	15	25	54	43	277
4	Olena Pidhrushna (UKR)	40	29	43	27	54	48	0	24	265
5	Kaisa Mäkäräinen (FIN)	14	48	22	34	48	31	24	34	255
6	Darya Domracheva (BLR)	54	40	—	40	31	16	40	30	251
7	Olga Vilukhina (RUS)	43	25	31	26	43	19	—	54	241
8	Gabriela Soukalová (CZE)	28	30	54	—	28	21	6	60	227
9	Olga Zaitseva (RUS)	19	20	30	60	26	43	—	28	226
10	Krystyna Pałka (POL)	30	22	24	14	19	54	43	16	222
11	Anastasiya Kuzmina (SVK)	34	28	10	22	27	27	48	26	222
12	Teja Gregorin (SLO)	20	43	27	16	34	9	36	25	210
13	Miriam Gössner (GER)	18	38	60	31	—	20	—	40	207
14	Vita Semerenko (UKR)	16	32	34	29	—	32	29	31	203
15	Veronika Vítková (CZE)	36	0	40	54	18	34	—	14	196
16	Magdalena Gwizdon (POL)	23	26	29	0	30	29	25	20	182
17	Synnøve Solemdal (NOR)	29	60	16	18	32	22	—	—	177
18	Anaïs Bescond (FRA)	17	27	28	21	—	18	27	32	170
19	Nadezhda Skardino (BLR)	27	23	38	2	23	26	23	1	163
20	Ekaterina Glazyrina (RUS)	32	19	17	17	—	40	—	21	146
21	Karin Oberhofer (ITA)	1	14	23	28	24	15	17	11	133
22	Nadine Horchler (GER)	10	31	13	20	40	—	10	4	128
23	Marie Laure Brunet (FRA)	38	18	—	38	—	30	—	—	124
24	Franziska Hildebrand (GER)	0	—	0	12	22	24	26	27	111
25	Valj Semerenko (UKR)	9	—	—	48	11	0	34	5	107
26	Ekaterina Shumilova (RUS)	—	34	26	30	—	12	—	2	104
27	Jana Gerekova (SVK)	31	6	18	—	21	23	—	0	99
28	Tiril Eckhoff (NOR)	0	0	19	—	12	—	38	29	98
29	Dorothea Wierer (ITA)	—	11	—	23	20	11	—	22	87
30	Michela Ponza (ITA)	21	10	0	—	13	—	30	10	84
31	Sophie Boilley (FRA)	0	0	21	0	36	13	11	0	81
32	Ekaterina Yurlova (RUS)	22	15	25	9	0	—	—	9	80
33	Selina Gasparin (SUI)	0	7	20	4	25	1	9	12	78
34	Weronika Nowakowska-Ziemniak (POL)	25	21	0	—	16	14	0	0	76
35	Ann Kristin Flatland (NOR)	—	—	—	—	38	36	—	—	74
36	Laura Dahlmeier (GER)	—	—	—	—	—	—	31	38	69
37	Fanny Welle-Strand Horn (NOR)	12	5	1	15	—	4	16	—	53
38	Juliya Dzhyma (UKR)	11	—	11	11	—	—	—	18	51
39	Monika Hojnisz (POL)	—	—	9	13	0	28	—	—	50
40	Marine Bolliet (FRA)	0	—	0	24	8	—	5	8	45
41	Zhang Yan (CHN)	—	0	0	25	0	17	—	—	42
42	Elisa Gasparin (SUI)	0	—	—	—	10	6	21	0	37
43	Ekaterina Iourieva (RUS)	—	—	—	—	—	—	28	7	35
44	Evi Sachenbacher-Stehle (GER)	—	—	0	—	—	—	12	23	35
45	Éva Tófalvi (ROU)	6	3	—	—	—	7	19	0	35
46	Natalya Burdyga (UKR)	—	0	—	19	0	—	15	—	34
47	Nicole Gontier (ITA)	0	0	2	0	17	0	0	13	32
48	Rosanna Crawford (CAN)	0	16	14	—	—	—	—	—	30
49	Diana Rasimovičiūtė (LTU)	8	1	—	—	—	3	—	17	29
50	Iris Schwabl (AUT)	—	0	0	6	14	8	—	—	28
51	Andreja Mali (SLO)	—	0	0	8	6	—	14	—	28
52	Marina Korovina (RUS)	26	—	—	0	—	—	—	—	26
53	Darya Usanova (KAZ)	—	—	—	5	0	0	—	19	24
54	Zina Kocher (CAN)	4	—	0	7	0	—	13	—	24
55	Hilde Fenne (NOR)	13	—	—	10	—	—	—	—	23
56	Emilia Yordanova (BUL)	—	—	—	—	—	—	22	—	22
57	Nastassia Dubarezava (BLR)	15	4	—	3	—	0	—	0	22
58	Annelies Cook (USA)	—	—	8	—	4	0	3	6	21
59	Irina Starykh (RUS)	—	—	—	—	—	—	20	—	20
60	Paulina Bobak (POL)	0	17	—	0	—	—	2	—	19
61	Mariya Panfilova (UKR)	—	—	—	—	—	—	18	—	18
62	Tina Bachmann (GER)	3	0	15	—	—	—	—	—	18
63	Liudmila Kalinchik (BLR)	—	—	4	0	—	5	8	0	17
64	Alexia Runggaldier (ITA)	0	13	—	0	1	2	—	—	16
65	Olga Podchufarova (RUS)	—	—	—	—	—	—	—	15	15
66	Agnieszka Cyl (POL)	—	2	12	—	—	—	—	—	14
67	Fuyuko Suzuki (JPN)	0	9	—	1	—	0	4	—	14
68	Anna Karin Strömstedt (SWE)	5	8	0	—	0	—	—	0	13
69	Megan Heinicke (CAN)	—	12	0	0	—	0	0	—	12
70	Tang Jialin (CHN)	—	—	—	0	—	10	—	—	10
71	Iana Bondar (UKR)	—	—	—	—	9	—	—	—	9
72	Sara Studebaker (USA)	—	0	6	—	2	—	—	—	8
73	Reka Ferencz (ROU)	7	—	—	—	—	0	—	—	7
74	Nadzeya Pisareva (BLR)	—	0	7	—	—	—	0	—	7
75	Maren Hammerschmidt (GER)	0	—	—	—	7	—	—	—	7
76	Valentina Nazarova (RUS)	—	—	—	—	—	—	7	—	7
77	Laure Soulie (AND)	0	—	—	—	5	—	0	0	5
78	Elisabeth Högberg (SWE)	—	—	5	—	—	0	—	—	5
79	Susan Dunklee (USA)	2	0	3	—	0	0	—	0	5
80	Anastasia Zagoruiko (RUS)	—	—	—	—	3	—	—	—	3
80	Ane Skrove Nossum (NOR)	—	—	—	—	—	—	—	3	3
82	Aleksandra Alikina (RUS)	—	—	—	—	—	—	1	—	1
