= Biathlon World Championships 2013 – Women's relay =

Women's relay at the Biathlon World Championships 2013
- Date: 15 February 2013
- Competitors: 100 from 25 nations
- Winning time: 1:08:11.0

Medalists
gold medal	Hilde Fenne; Ann Kristin Flatland; Synnøve Solemdal; Tora Berger	Norway
silver medal	Juliya Dzhyma; Vita Semerenko; Valj Semerenko; Olena Pidhrushna	Ukraine
bronze medal	Dorothea Wierer; Nicole Gontier; Michela Ponza; Karin Oberhofer	Italy

The Women's relay event of the Biathlon World Championships 2013 was held on February 15, 2013. Twenty-five nations participated over a course of 4 × 6km.

== Results ==
The race was started at 17:15.

Rank	Bib	Team	Time	Penalties (P+S)	Deficit
1st place, gold medalist(s)	1	Norway; Hilde Fenne; Ann Kristin Flatland; Synnøve Solemdal; Tora Berger	1:08:11.0; 17:18.1; 17:29.1; 16:53.5; 16:30.3	0+2 1+7; 0+2 1+3; 0+0 0+2; 0+0 0+1; 0+0 0+1	
2nd place, silver medalist(s)	4	Ukraine; Juliya Dzhyma; Vita Semerenko; Valj Semerenko; Olena Pidhrushna	1:08:18.0; 16:49.5; 17:03.3; 17:12.6; 17:12.6	0+3 0+2; 0+0 0+1; 0+2 0+0; 0+1 0+0; 0+0 0+1	+7.0
3rd place, bronze medalist(s)	7	Italy; Dorothea Wierer; Nicole Gontier; Michela Ponza; Karin Oberhofer	1:08:22.6; 16:30.8; 17:07.7; 17:48.5; 16:55.6	0+2 0+2; 0+0 0+0; 0+2 0+0; 0+0 0+2; 0+0 0+0	+11.6
4	2	Russia; Ekaterina Glazyrina; Olga Zaitseva; Ekaterina Shumilova; Olga Vilukhina	1:08:40.0; 16:30.3; 17:06.8; 18:04.1; 16:58.8	0+0 0+7; 0+0 0+1; 0+0 0+2; 0+0 0+3; 0+0 0+1	+29.0
5	3	Germany; Franziska Hildebrand; Miriam Gössner; Laura Dahlmeier; Andrea Henkel	1:08:41.9; 16:57.4; 17:05.2; 16:59.5; 17:39.8	0+4 0+7; 0+0 0+3; 0+3 0+2; 0+0 0+0; 0+1 0+2	+30.9
6	5	France; Anaïs Bescond; Sophie Boilley; Marie-Laure Brunet; Marie Dorin-Habert	1:08:47.7; 16:42.9; 17:41.7; 17:23.3; 16:59.8	0+4 0+9; 0+0 0+3; 0+2 0+1; 0+2 0+2; 0+0 0+3	+36.7
7	8	Belarus; Nadezhda Skardino; Liudmila Kalinchik; Nastassia Dubarezava; Darya Domracheva	1:09:13.2; 16:32.3; 17:14.4; 18:27.4; 16:59.1	1+5 0+2; 0+0 0+0; 0+1 0+0; 1+3 0+1; 0+1 0+1	+1:02.2
8	10	Slovakia; Jana Gereková; Anastasiya Kuzmina; Martina Chrapánová; Paulina Fialková	1:10:11.3; 16:30.9; 17:05.7; 18:15.5; 18:19.2	0+7 0+7; 0+1 0+2; 0+1 0+2; 0+3 0+2; 0+2 0+1	+2:00.3
9	6	Poland; Krystyna Pałka; Magdalena Gwizdoń; Monika Hojnisz; Weronika Nowakowska-Ziemniak	1:10:31.3; 16:20.9; 17:59.6; 18:30.6; 17:40.2	1+7 0+6; 0+2 0+0; 1+3 0+3; 0+1 0+2; 0+1 0+1	+2:20.3
10	9	Czech Republic; Veronika Vítková; Gabriela Soukalová; Jitka Landová; Barbora Tomešová	1:11:05.7; 16:20.8; 17:03.1; 18:50.0; 18:51.8	0+3 2+7; 0+1 0+0; 0+1 0+1; 0+0 1+3; 0+1 1+3	+2:54.7
11	16	United States; Annelies Cook; Sara Studebaker; Susan Dunklee; Hanah Dressigacker	1:11:15.5; 17:37.5; 17:54.5; 16:59.0; 18:44.5	1+6 0+4; 0+2 0+3; 0+1 0+0; 0+0 0+0; 1+3 0+1	+3:04.5
12	18	Canada; Rosanna Crawford; Megan Heinicke; Audrey Vaillancourt; Zina Kocher	1:11:26.2; 16:43.3; 17:56.7; 18:26.0; 18:20.2	1+6 0+7; 0+2 0+1; 0+0 0+3; 0+1 0+3; 1+3 0+0	+3:15.2
13	20	Switzerland; Elisa Gasparin; Selina Gasparin; Patricia Jost; Aita Gasparin	1:12:11.6; 16:52.7; 17:27.7; 18:48.4; 19:02.8	0+2 0+5; 0+0 0+0; 0+0 0+3; 0+1 0+1; 0+1 0+1	+4:00.6
14	12	Kazakhstan; Elena Khrustaleva; Darya Usanova; Alina Raikova; Marina Lebedeva	1:12:14.9; 17:51.7; 17:38.9; 18:35.2; 18:09.1	0+4 0+2; 0+2 0+2; 0+1 0+0; 0+0 0+0; 0+1 0+0	+4:03.9
15	11	Sweden; Elisabeth Högberg; Anna-Karin Strömstedt; Elin Mattsson; Ingela Andersson	1:12:26.8; 16:34.4; 18:48.9; 18:14.1; 18:49.4	0+1 1+7; 0+0 0+0; 0+1 1+3; 0+0 0+2; 0+0 0+2	+4:15.8
16	19	China; Tang Jialin; Zhang Yan; Song Chaoqing; Ma Wei	1:12:27.6; 17:50.8; 17:32.9; 18:39.9; 18:24.0	0+6 1+7; 0+2 1+3; 0+0 0+1; 0+2 0+2; 0+2 0+1	+4:16.6
17	24	Slovenia; Teja Gregorin; Andreja Mali; Dijana Ravnikar; Lili Drčar	1:12:29.3; 16:29.4; 17:29.2; 18:46.1; 19:44.6	0+4 0+3; 0+0 0+1; 0+0 0+1; 0+2 0+0; 0+2 0+1	+4:18.3
	14	Bulgaria; Emilia Yordanova; Niya Dimitrova; Desislava Stoyanova; Stefani Popova	LAP; 17:28.8; 17:58.3; 19:18.7	0+3 1+8; 0+1 0+2; 0+0 0+0; 0+2 1+3; 0+0 0+3	
	15	Austria; Iris Schwabl; Romana Schrempf; Katharina Innerhofer; Lisa Theresa Hauser	LAP; 17:06.0; 19:08.5; 18:49.8	0+4 3+7; 0+1 0+0; 0+3 2+3; 0+0 1+3; 0+0 0+1	
	17	Estonia; Kadri Lethla; Kristel Viigipuu; Johanna Talihärm; Grete Gaim	LAP; 17:15.2; 18:50.4; 18:34.7	0+2 0+8; 0+0 0+2; 0+0 0+3; 0+0 0+2; 0+2 0+1	
	22	Finland; Mari Laukkanen; Sanna Markkanen; Annukka Siltakorpi; Kaisa Mäkäräinen	LAP; 17:46.6; 19:40.6; 20:17.7	0+4 0+8; 0+2 0+3; 0+2 0+2; 0+0 0+3; 0+0 0+0	
	23	Japan; Fuyuko Suzuki; Arisa Goshono; Yuki Nakajima; Itsuka Owada	LAP; 17:52.2; 19:31.4; 19:45.0	0+5 0+5; 0+1 0+2; 0+0 0+0; 0+2 0+3; 0+2 0+0	
	25	Lithuania; Diana Rasimovičiūtė; Natalija Kočergina; Marija Kaznacenko; Karolina Banel	LAP; 17:22.2; 19:45.1; 20:26.9	3+8 1+8; 0+0 1+3; 2+3 0+2; 1+3 0+1; 0+2 0+2	
	21	South Korea; Jo In-Hee; Kim Seon-Su; Park Ji-Ae; Hwang Hye-Suk	LAP; 18:51.3; 20:42.5; 20:06.4	1+6 0+6; 0+1 0+0; 1+3 0+1; 0+0 0+2; 0+2 0+3	
	13	Romania; Réka Ferencz; Éva Tófalvi; Luminita Piscoran; Orsolya Tófalvi	DSQ; 16:49.2; 17:18.9; 17:34.5; 19:25.9	0+0 0+0; 0+1 0+1; 0+0 0+0; 0+1 0+2	
