= Johanna Talihärm =

Estonian biathlete (born 1993)

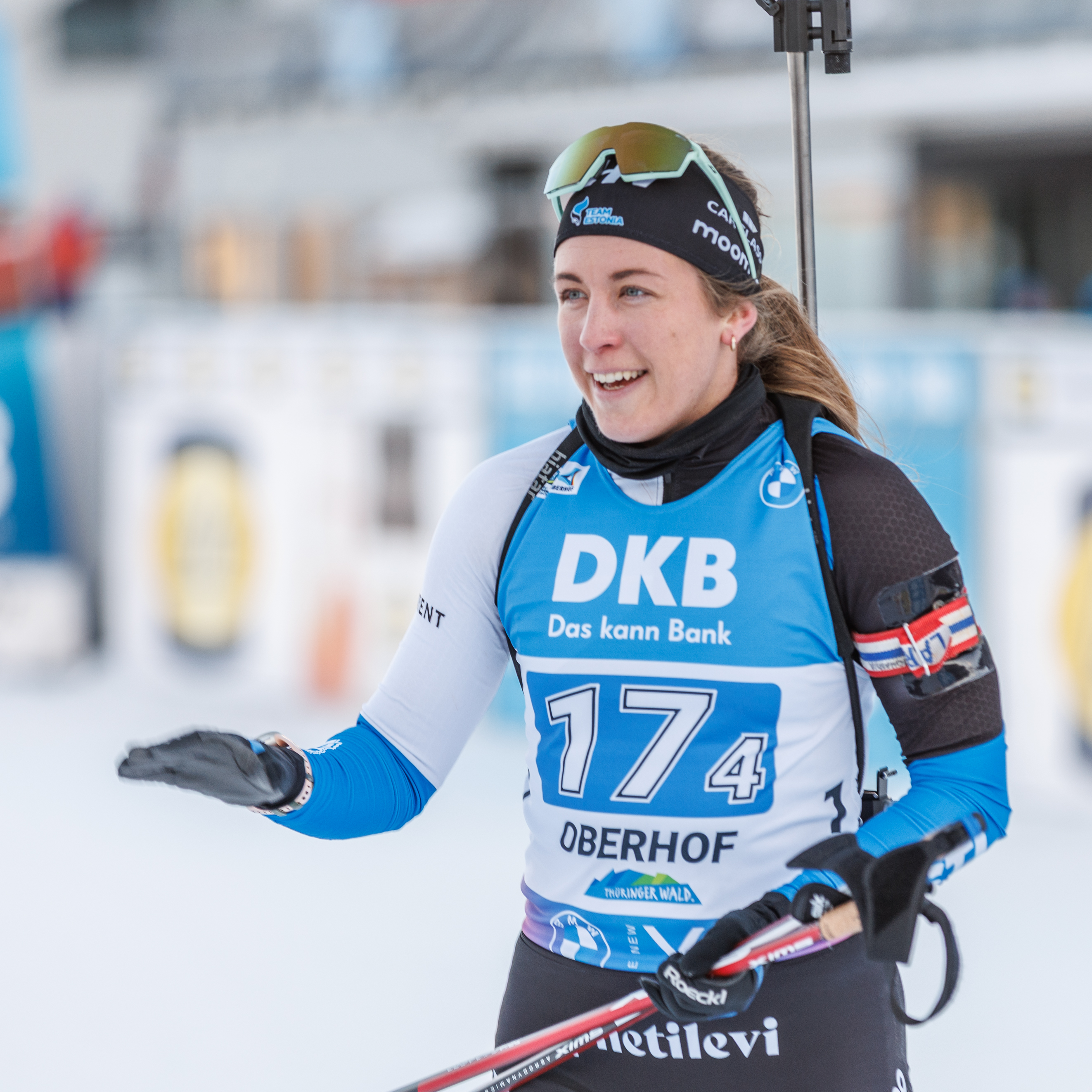
- Talihärm in 2025

Personal information
- Born: 27 June 1993 (age 33) Tallinn, Estonia

Sport

Professional information
- World Cup debut: 4 Jan 2012 (in relay); 1 Dec 2012 (in indiv.)

World Championships
- Teams: 6 (2013–2015, 2017–2021)

World Cup
- Seasons: 9 (2017–18–)
- Individual races: 79
- All races: 115
- Individual victories: 0
- All victories: 0
- Individual podiums: 0
- All podiums: 0

Johanna Talihärm (born 27 June 1993 in Tallinn) is an Estonian biathlete. She competed at the Biathlon World Championships 2013, and at the 2014 Winter Olympics in Sochi. She represented Estonia at the 2018 Winter Olympics.

Her brother Johan was also a biathlete.

== Biathlon results ==
All results are sourced from the International Biathlon Union.

=== Olympic Games ===
Event	Individual	Sprint	Pursuit	Mass start	Relay	Mixed relay
(Russia) 2014 Sochi	72nd	48th	55th	—	15th	—
(South Korea) 2018 Pyeongchang	50th	22nd	26th	—	—	—
(China) 2022 Beijing	66th	43rd	DNS	—	15th	—
(Italy) 2026 Milano Cortina	74th	82nd	—	—	14th	—

=== World Championships ===
Event	Individual	Sprint	Pursuit	Mass start	Relay	Mixed relay	Single mixed relay
(Czech Republic) 2013 Nové Město	99th	85th	—	—	20th	—	—N/a
(Finland) 2015 Kontiolahti	70th	38th	43rd	—	15th	—	—N/a
(Austria) 2017 Hochfilzen	57th	87th	—	—	19th	21st	—N/a
(Sweden) 2019 Östersund	28th	20th	34th	—	12th	14th	—
(Italy) 2020 Antholz-Anterselva	53rd	31st	51st	—	DSQ	15th	—
(Slovenia) 2021 Pokljuka	30th	32nd	33rd	—	17th	19th	10th
(Germany) 2023 Oberhof	77th	91st	—	—	10th	—	—
(Czech Republic) 2024 Nové Město	—	63rd	—	—	4th	—	—
(Switzerland) 2025 Lenzerheide	57th	49th	LAP	—	10th	—	—

=== World Cup ===
Season	Overall		Individual		Sprint		Pursuit		Mass start	
Season	Points	Position	Points	Position	Points	Position	Points	Position	Points	Position
2014–15	3	92nd	—	—	3	84th	—	—	—	—
2015–16	16	86th	10	54th	6	87th	—	—	—	—
2016–17	Didn't earn World Cup point									
2017–18	12	83rd	—	—	—	—	12	68th	—	—
2018–19	79	59th	13	54th	49	53rd	17	65th	—	—
2019–20	26	72nd	—	—	25	63rd	1	74th	—	—
2020–21	97	55th	25	40th	34	59th	28	52nd	—	—

=== Other competition ===
==== European Championships ====
Event	Level	Individual	Sprint	Pursuit	Relay	Mixed relay	Single mixed relay	Super sprint
(Estonia) 2010 Otepää	U21	30th	38th	41st	—N/a	—	—N/a	—N/a
(Slovakia) 2012 Brezno	U21	20th	24th	22nd	—N/a	11th	—N/a	—N/a
(Estonia) 2015 Otepää	Senior	—	45th	32nd	9th	—	—N/a	—N/a
(Italy) 2018 Ridnaun	Senior	DNS	57th	DNS	—N/a	15th	—	—N/a
(Belarus) 2020 Minsk	Senior	—N/a	13th	13th	—N/a	—	6th	DNSQ
(Poland) 2021 Duszniki-Zdrój	Senior	26th	25th	30th	—N/a	15th	—	—N/a

==== Junior/Youth World Championships ====
Event	Level	Individual	Sprint	Pursuit	Relay
(Sweden) 2010 Torsby	Youth	68th	55th	54th	10th
(Czech Republic) 2011 Nové Město	Youth	30th	31st	22nd	4th
(Finland) 2012 Kontiolahti	Youth	23rd	21st	24th	11th
(Italy) 2013 Obertilliach	Junior	—	17th	DNS	—
(United States) 2014 Presque Isle	Junior	34th	DNS	—	—
