= Lyudmila Ananko =

Belarusian biathlete (born 1982)

Personal information
- Nationality: Belarusian
- Born: 19 April 1982 (age 44) Novogrudok, USSR

Sport
- Sport: Biathlon
Medal record
Women's biathlon
Representing Belarus
Junior World Championships
Gold medal – first place	2003 Kościelisko	7.5 km sprint
Bronze medal – third place	2001 Khanty-Mansiysk	10 km pursuit
Bronze medal – third place	2002 Ridnaun	7.5 km sprint
Bronze medal – third place	2003 Kościelisko	12.5 km individual

Lyudmila Arkadzieuna Ananko (born 19 April 1982) is a Belarusian biathlete. She competed at the 2002 Winter Olympics and the 2006 Winter Olympics.
