= Jia Yuping =

Chinese cross-country skier

Personal information
- Nationality: Chinese
- Born: 3 May 1986 (age 40)

Sport
- Sport: Cross-country skiing
Medal record
Women's biathlon
Representing China
Youth World Championships
Gold medal – first place	2002 Ridnaun	3 × 6 km relay

Jia Yuping (born 3 May 1986) is a Chinese cross-country skier. She competed in the women's sprint at the 2006 Winter Olympics.
