= Biathlon Junior World Championships 2002 =

Biathlon event in Italy

The 2002 Biathlon Junior World Championships was held in Ridnaun-Val Ridanna, Italy from January 30 to February 3, 2002. There was to be a total of 16 competitions: sprint, pursuit, individual, and relay races for men and women.

== Medal winners ==
=== Youth Women ===
Event:	Gold:	Time	Silver:	Time	Bronze:	Time
10 km individual details	Kaja Eckhoff; Norway	35:46.9 (1+1+0+0)	Nina Karasevych; Ukraine	35:49.5 (0+0+0+1)	Mervi Markkanen; Finland	35:55.9 (1+2+0+0)
6 km sprint details	Dong Xue; China	18:45.4 (1+1)	Anna Boulygina; Russia	18:52.8 (2+1)	Olga Dudchenko; Kazakhstan	19:06.8 (1+1)
7.5 km pursuit details	Dong Xue; China	27:38.7 (1+0+2+1)	Kathlen Lindau; Germany	27:57.0 (0+0+1+0)	Anna Rathmann; Germany	28:00.5 (0+1+1+0)
3 × 6 km relay details	China; Yin Qiao; Jia Yuping; Dong Xue	58:01.1 (1+3) (0+0) (0+1) (0+2) (0+0) (0+2)	Russia; Natalia Egoshina; Anastasiya Shipulina; Maria Kossinova	58:07.9 (0+0) (0+3) (2+3) (0+1) (0+3) (0+3)	Germany; Anna Rathmann; Anne Preußler; Kathlen Lindau	58:23.4 (0+2) (0+1) (0+0) (0+1) (0+0) (0+3)

=== Junior Women ===
Event:	Gold:	Time	Silver:	Time	Bronze:	Time
12.5 km individual details	Nadezhda Kolesnikova; Russia	40:43.8 (0+0+0+0)	Ute Niziak; Germany	43:27.3 (1+1+1+0)	Lanny Barnes; United States	43:30.0 (0+0+0+1)
7.5 km sprint details	Kathrin Pfisterer; Germany	23:24.5 (0+0)	Jenny Adler; Germany	23:28.7 (0+1)	Lyudmila Ananko; Belarus	23:43.6 (0+0)
10 km pursuit details	Jenny Adler; Germany	32:38.3 (0+0+0+2)	Ute Niziak; Germany	33:09.4 (0+0+1+1)	Kathrin Pfisterer; Germany	33:20.2 (0+0+2+2)
3 × 7.5 km relay details	Germany; Jenny Adler; Kathrin Pfisterer; Ute Niziak	1:11:04.4 (0+1) (0+0) (0+1) (1+3) (0+0) (0+1)	United States; Carolyn Treacy; Tracy Barnes; Lanny Barnes	1:12:23.7 (0+0) (0+0) (0+0) (0+0) (0+1) (0+3)	Russia; Tatyana Bryukhanova; Elena Davgul; Nadezhda Kolesnikova	1:13:20.5 (0+0) (0+3) (1+3) (0+1) (0+3) (0+0)

=== Youth Men ===
Event:	Gold:	Time	Silver:	Time	Bronze:	Time
12.5 km individual details	Christoph Knie; Germany	39:10.8 (2+1+1+0)	Oleg Berezhnoy; Ukraine	39:17.7 (0+1+1+1)	Tobias Strohm; Germany	39:30.7 (1+2+0+1)
7.5 km sprint details	Marcel Lorenc; Germany	21:25.9 (0+2)	Simon Fourcade; France	21:35.6 (0+0)	Ondřej Moravec; Czech Republic	21:38.6 (3+1)
10 km pursuit details	Andrei Doubassov; Russia	30:01.9 (0+1+1+1)	Tobias Strohm; Germany	30:02.6 (0+0+1+3)	Ondřej Moravec; Czech Republic	30:10.0 (2+2+1+2)
3 × 7.5 km relay details	Germany; Marcel Lorenc; Tobias Strohm; Christoph Knie	1:01:10.3 (0+0 (0+1) (0+1) (0+0) (0+0) (0+0)	Russia; Aleksandr Petrov; Vladislav Moiseev; Andrei Doubassov	1:04:35.8 (0+2) (2+3) (0+2) (0+0) (0+2) (0+3)	Poland; Rafał Skoczowski; Stanisław Karpiel; Paweł Lasek	1:05:10. (0+1) (0+0) (0+0) (0+3) (0+0) (0+1)

=== Junior Men ===
Event:	Gold:	Time	Silver:	Time	Bronze:	Time
15 km individual details	Simon Eder; Austria	42:12.4 (0+1+0+0)	Michael Rösch; Germany	42:34.7 (1+1+0+1)		
15 km individual details	Simon Eder; Austria	42:12.4 (0+1+0+0)	Artem Gusev; Russia	42:34.7 (1+1+0+0)		
10 km sprint details	Mattias Nilsson; Sweden	26:31.4 (1+1)	Robert Wick; Germany	26:33.6 (0+1)	Michal Šlesingr; Czech Republic	26:40.1 (0+2)
12.5 km pursuit details	Michal Šlesingr; Czech Republic	37:10.1 (1+0+1+1)	Maxim Chudov; Russia	37:38.1 (0+2+1+2)	Sergey Dashkevich; Belarus	37:57.4 (1+0+1+0)
4 × 7.5 km relay details	Germany; Michael Rösch; Robert Wick; Hansjörg Reuter; Markus Neumaier	1:20:29.9 (0+3) (0+2) (0+1) (0+0) (0+2) (0+0) (0+3) (0+2)	Czech Republic; Jaroslav Soukup; Milan Faltus; Ondřej Moravec; Michal Šlesingr	1:20:32.7 (0+3) (0+2) (0+0) (0+2) (0+1) (0+0) (0+0) (0+0)	Belarus; Sergey Dashkevich; Vladimir Miklashevsky; Alexey Yurchenko; Aleksandr Myntnik	1:21:58.4 (0+1) (0+1) (0+1) (0+1) (0+3) (0+0) (0+1) (0+1)

== Medal table ==
Rank	Nation	Gold	Silver	Bronze	Total
1	Germany (GER)	7	7	4	18
2	China (CHN)	3	0	0	3
3	Russia (RUS)	2	5	1	8
4	Czech Republic (CZE)	1	1	3	5
5	Austria (AUT)	1	0	0	1
5	Norway (NOR)	1	0	0	1
5	Sweden (SWE)	1	0	0	1
8	Ukraine (UKR)	0	2	0	2
9	United States (USA)	0	1	1	2
10	France (FRA)	0	1	0	1
11	Belarus (BLR)	0	0	3	3
12	Finland (FIN)	0	0	1	1
12	Kazakhstan (KAZ)	0	0	1	1
12	Poland (POL)	0	0	1	1
Totals (14 entries)		16	17	15	48
