= Laure Soulié =

Andorran biathlete (born 1987)

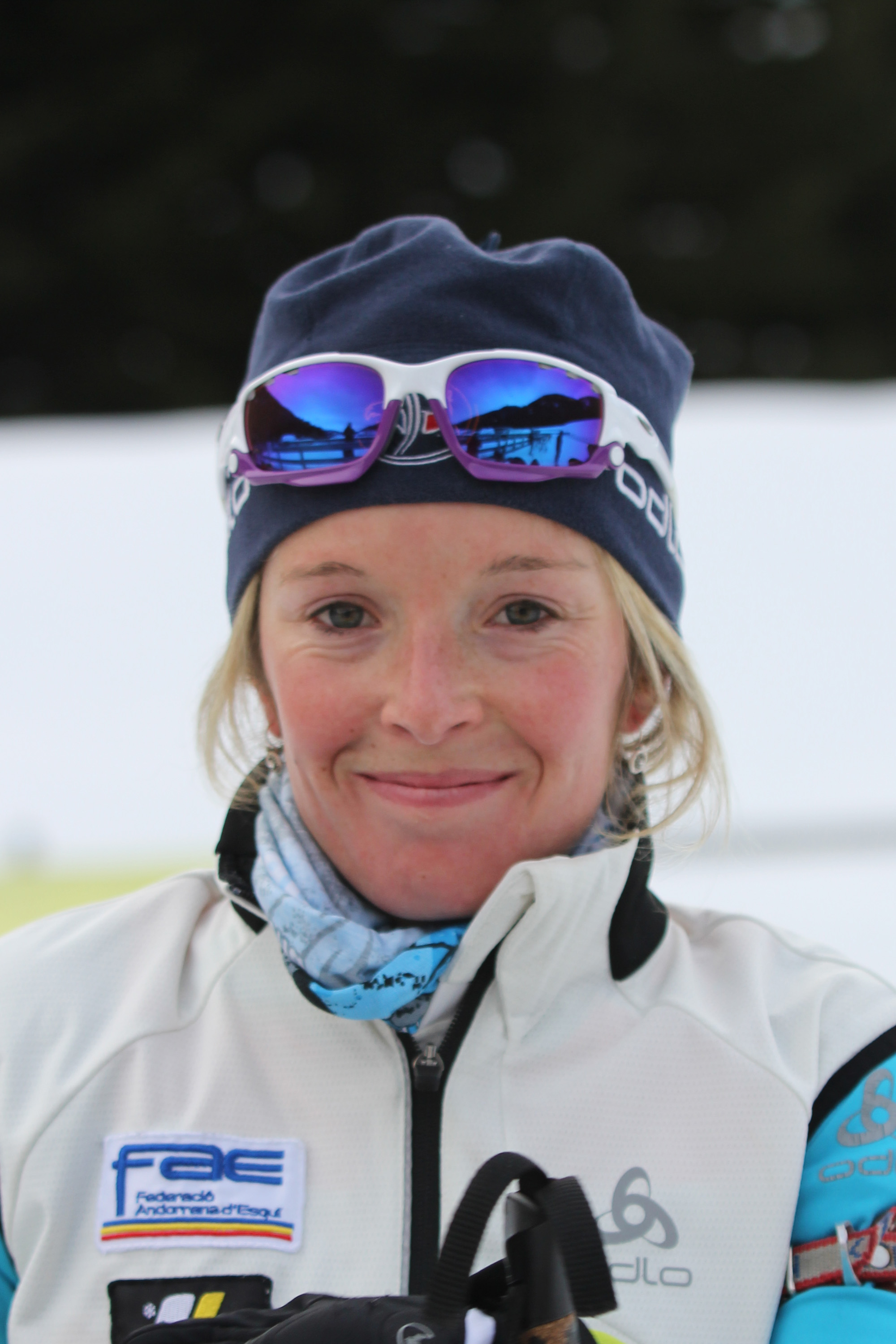
- Soulié in 2010

Personal information
- Born: 28 April 1987 (age 39) El Pas de la Casa, Andorra
- Height: 160 cm (5 ft 3 in)
- Weight: 49 kg (108 lb)

Sport
- Country: Andorra
- Sport: Biathlon
Medal record
Representing France
Youth World Championships
Bronze medal – third place	2006 Presque Isle	3 × 6 km relay

Laure Soulié (born 28 April 1987) is a retired Andorran biathlete who originally competed for France as her mother is French and Andorra had no team. She has competed for Andorra since 2009 and represented Andorra at the 2014 Winter Olympics. Her best placing is 9th in a 15 km individual race in Ruhpolding, Germany in the 2013–2014 season.
