= Biathlon Junior World Championships 2006 =

Biathlon event in the United States

The 2006 Biathlon Junior World Championships was held in Presque Isle, United States from January 28 to February 3, 2006. There was to be a total of 16 competitions: sprint, pursuit, individual, mass start, and relay races for men and women.

== Medal winners ==
=== Youth Women ===
Event:	Gold:	Time	Silver:	Time	Bronze:	Time
10 km individual details	Veronika Vítková; Czech Republic	39:12.5 (2+2+0+1)	Irina Starykh; Russia	39:29.0 (0+2+0+2)	Olena Pidhrushna; Ukraine	39:52.5 (2+1+1+0)
6 km sprint details	Olga Vilukhina; Russia	19:42.0 (1+0)	Irina Starykh; Russia	20:14.6 (0+1)	Tamara Barič; Slovenia	20:26.3 (1+2)
7.5 km pursuit details	Tamara Barič; Slovenia	23:18.5 (2+0+1+0)	Iris Schwabl; Austria	24:03.9 (1+1+0+2)	Olga Vilukhina; Russia	24:13.7 (1+0+2+2)
3 × 6 km relay details	Austria; Iris Schwabl; Anna Hufnagl; Elisabeth Mayer	59:13.1 (0+1) (0+0) (0+0) (0+0) (0+0) (0+1)	Russia; Olga Vilukhina; Evgenia Seledtsova; Irina Starykh	59:53.5 (0+0) (0+3) (0+2) (2+3) (0+1) (0+3)	France; Marine Dusser; Marine Bolliet; Laure Soulie	1:00:15.6 (1+3) (0+1) (0+0) (0+3) (0+1) (0+2)

=== Junior Women ===
Event:	Gold:	Time	Silver:	Time	Bronze:	Time
12.5 km individual details	Marion Blondeau; France	41:40.1 (0+1+0+2)	Pauline Macabies; France	42:04.4 (0+1+2+0)	Carolin Hennecke; Germany	42:42.1 (1+1+1+0)
7.5 km sprint details	Carolin Hennecke; Germany	22:13.1 (1+0)	Magdalena Neuner; Germany	22:17.9 (1+3)	Marion Blondeau; France	22:28.9 (1+1)
10 km pursuit details	Magdalena Neuner; Germany	31:30.2 (0+1+0+1)	Marion Blondeau; France	34:09.0 (1+0+2+2)	Darya Domracheva; Belarus	35:36.9 (2+1+2+1)
3 × 6 km relay details	Germany; Stephanie Müller; Magdalena Neuner; Carolin Hennecke	1:01:39.8 (0+2) (0+3) (0+2) (2+3) (0+0) (0+2)	France; Pauline Macabies; Marie Dorin; Marion Blondeau	1:02:09.5 (0+0) (1+3) (0+1) (0+2) (0+0) (0+1)	Russia; Svetlana Sleptsova; Anna Kunaeva; Ekaterina Shumilova	1:02:40.2 (0+0) (0+2) (0+1) (0+3) (0+0) (0+3)

=== Youth Men ===
Event:	Gold:	Time	Silver:	Time	Bronze:	Time
12.5 km individual details	Tarjei Bø; Norway	33:37.1 (0+0+0+1)	Łukasz Szczurek; Poland	35:29.6 (1+0+0+1)	Dominik Landertinger; Austria	36:00.3 (0+1+1+0)
7.5 km sprint details	Arild Askestad; Norway	19:45.9 (1+1)	Florian Graf; Germany	20:01.7 (2+1)	Alexander Ogarkov; Russia	20:05.7 (1+0)
10 km pursuit details	Arild Askestad; Norway	29:24.6 (1+1+0+1)	Tarjei Bø; Norway	30:06.4 (2+1+2+1)	Alexander Ogarkov; Russia	30:08.3 (0+1+2+1)
3 × 7.5 km relay details	Russia; Anton Shipulin; Alexander Starykh; Alexander Ogarkov	59:14.5 (0+1) (0+2) (0+1) (0+2) (0+1) (0+1)	Austria; Sven Grossegger; Daniel Salvenmoser; Dominik Landertinger	59:33.2 (0+2) (0+1) (0+1) (0+2) (0+1) (0+0)	Belarus; Yuryi Liadov; Igor Tabola; Evgeny Abramenko	1:02:23.3 (0+1) (0+0) (0+2) (1+3) (0+1) (1+3)

=== Junior Men ===
Event:	Gold:	Time	Silver:	Time	Bronze:	Time
15 km individual details	Evgeny Ustyugov; Russia	43:14.1 (0+1+0+1)	Kiril Vasilev; Bulgaria	44:07.1 (0+0+0+1)	Petr Hradecký; Czech Republic	44:47.5 (0+1+0+3)
10 km sprint details	Petr Hradecký; Czech Republic	26:48.1 (0+1)	Vincent Jay; France	27:06.9 (1+1)	Jean-Philippe Leguellec; Canada	27:10.5 (1+0)
12.5 km pursuit details	Evgeny Ustyugov; Russia	33:18.1 (1+2+0+1)	Kiril Vasilev; Bulgaria	33:24.6 (0+0+0+1)	Petr Hradecký; Czech Republic	33:46.8 (1+2+0+1)
4 × 7.5 km relay details	France; Alexis Bœuf; Damien Gehin; Arnaud Langel; Vincent Jay	1:25:20.4 (0+1) (0+2) (0+0) (0+1) (0+2) (0+2) (0+3) (0+2)	Russia; Kirill Shcherbakov; Alexander Kopytov; Alexey Chudov; Evgeny Ustyugov	1:25:29.7 (0+0) (0+0) (0+1) (0+2) (0+2) (2+3) (0+0) (0+2)	Germany; Norman Jahn; Daniel Böhm; Jens Zimmer; Christoph Stephan	1:25:55.0 (0+1) (1+3) (0+1) (1+3) (0+0) (0+3) (0+3) (0+3)

== Medal table ==
Rank	Nation	Gold	Silver	Bronze	Total
1	Russia (RUS)	4	4	4	12
2	Germany (GER)	3	2	2	7
3	Norway (NOR)	3	1	0	4
4	France (FRA)	2	4	2	8
5	Czech Republic (CZE)	2	0	2	4
6	Austria (AUT)	1	2	1	4
7	Slovenia (SLO)	1	0	1	2
8	Bulgaria (BUL)	0	2	0	2
9	Poland (POL)	0	1	0	1
10	Belarus (BLR)	0	0	2	2
11	Canada (CAN)	0	0	1	1
11	Ukraine (UKR)	0	0	1	1
Totals (12 entries)		16	16	16	48
