= Łukasz Szczurek =

Polish biathlete (born 1988)

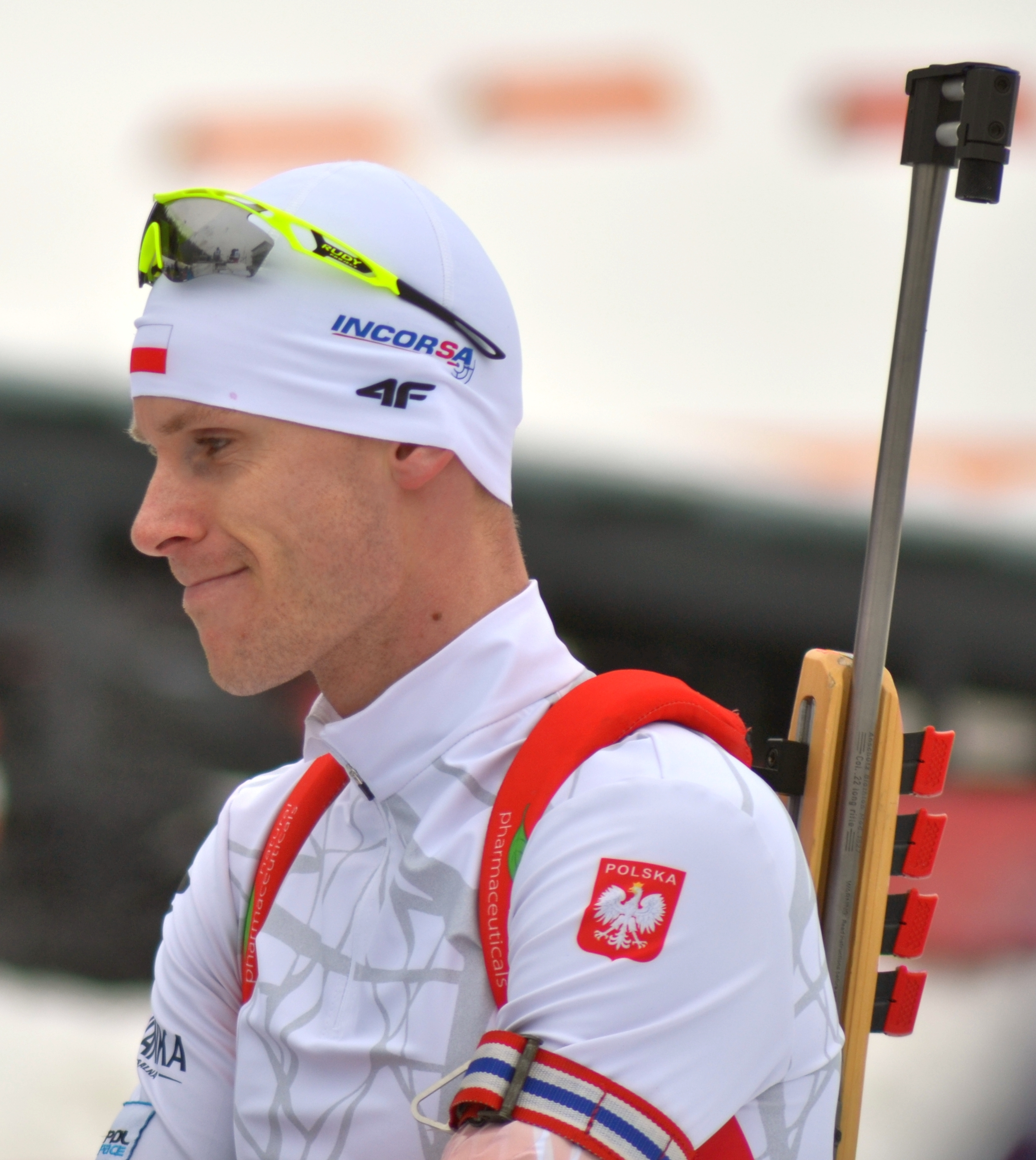
- Szczurek in 2017

Personal information
- Nationality: Polish
- Born: 1 April 1988 (age 38) Sanok, PR Poland
- Height: 180 cm (5 ft 11 in)
- Weight: 60 kg (132 lb)
Medal record
Men's biathlon
Representing Poland
Youth World Championships
Gold medal – first place	2007 Martell	12.5 km individual
Silver medal – second place	2006 Presque Isle	12.5 km individual

Łukasz Szczurek (born 1 April 1988 in Sanok, Poland) is a Polish biathlete. He competed in the 2010 Winter Olympics for Poland.

== Biathlon results ==
All results are sourced from the International Biathlon Union.

=== Olympic Games ===
0 medals

Event	Individual	Sprint	Pursuit	Mass start	Relay	Mixed relay
(Canada) 2010 Vancouver	59th	85th	—	—	—	—
(Russia) 2014 Sochi	50th	77th	—	—	19th	12th

*The mixed relay was added as an event in 2014.

=== World Championships ===
0 medals

Event	Individual	Sprint	Pursuit	Mass start	Relay	Mixed relay	Single mixed relay
(Sweden) 2008 Östersund	—	—	—	—	17th	—	—
(South Korea) 2009 Pyeongchang	—	—	—	—	13th	—	—
(Russia) 2011 Khanty-Mansiysk	72nd	93rd	—	—	21st	—	—
(Germany) 2012 Ruhpolding	79th	85th	—	—	22nd	—	—
(Czech Republic) 2013 Nové Město	41st	84th	—	—	27th	10th	—
(Finland) 2015 Kontiolahti	46th	63rd	—	—	20th	14th	—
(Norway) 2016 Oslo	78th	76th	—	—	21st	20th	—
(Austria) 2017 Hochfilzen	57th	72nd	—	—	24th	23rd	—
(Sweden) 2019 Östersund	50th	70th	—	—	16th	9th	—
(Italy) 2020 Rasen-Antholz	37th	61st	—	—	16th	17th	—

*During Olympic seasons competitions are only held for those events not included in the Olympic program.
**The single mixed relay was added as an event in 2019.
