= Nicole Gontier =

Italian biathlete

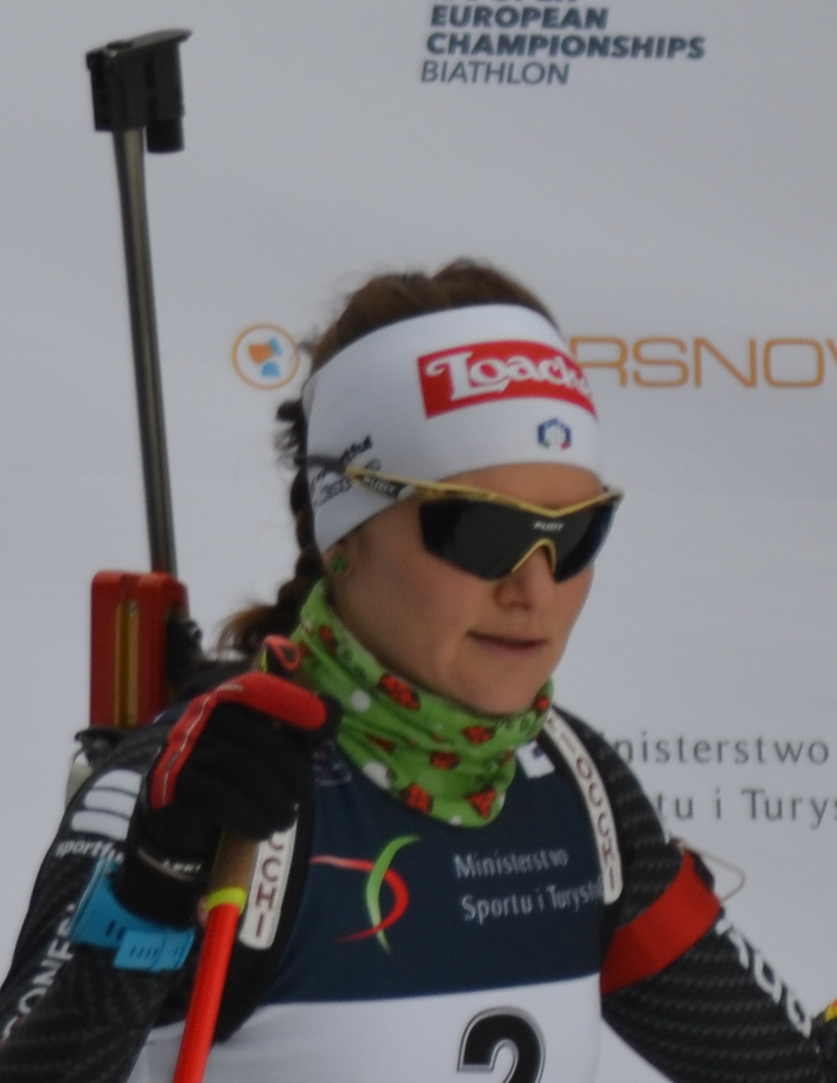

Personal information
- Born: 17 November 1991 (age 34) Aosta, Italy
- Height: 1.65 m (5 ft 5 in)

Sport
- Sport: Skiing

World Cup career
- Indiv. podiums: 2
Medal record
Women's biathlon
Representing Italy
World Championships
Bronze medal – third place	2013 Nové Město	4 x 6 km relay
Bronze medal – third place	2015 Kontiolathi	4 x 6 km relay
Junior World Championships
Silver medal – second place	2011 Nové Město	3 × 6 km relay
Silver medal – second place	2012 Kontiolahti	3 × 6 km relay
Youth World Championships
Bronze medal – third place	2009 Canmore	3 × 6 km relay

Nicole Gontier (born 17 November 1991) is an Italian biathlete. Born in Aosta but originally from Champorcher, Gontier competes in the Biathlon World Cup. Gontier has won a bronze medal at the Biathlon World Championships 2013 (4x6 km relay). She competed at the 2018 Winter Olympics in Pyeongchang.

== Biathlon results ==
All results are sourced from the International Biathlon Union.

=== Olympic Games ===
0 medals

Event	Individual	Sprint	Pursuit	Mass start	Relay	Mixed relay
(Russia) 2014 Sochi	45th	54th	49th	—	6th	—
(South Korea) 2018 Pyeongchang	38th	44th	48th	—	9th	—

=== World Championships ===
2 medals (2 bronze)

Event	Individual	Sprint	Pursuit	Mass start	Relay	Mixed relay	Single mixed relay
(Germany) 2012 Ruhpolding	68th	79th	—	—	12th	—	—
(Czech Republic) 2013 Nové Město	—	50th	59th	—	Bronze	—	—
(Finland) 2015 Kontiolahti	35th	66th	—	—	Bronze	—	—
(Sweden) 2019 Östersund	69th	52nd	48th	—	10th	—	—

*During Olympic seasons competitions are only held for those events not included in the Olympic program.
**The single mixed relay was added as an event in 2019.

=== World Cup ===
==== Podiums ====
Season	Place	Competition	Placement
2014–15	(Germany) Oberhof	Sprint	3rd
2014–15	(Norway) Holmenkollen	Relay	2nd
