= Biathlon Junior World Championships 2003 =

Biathlon event in Poland

The 2003 Biathlon Junior World Championships was held in Kościelisko, Poland from February 5 to February 9 2003. There was to be a total of 16 competitions: sprint, pursuit, individual, mass start, and relay races for men and women.

== Medal winners ==
=== Youth Women ===
Event:	Gold:	Time	Silver:	Time	Bronze:	Time
10 km individual details	Tereza Hlavsová; Czech Republic	45:08.7 (0+0+0+1)	Anastasiya Shipulina; Russia	46:02.7 (2+0+2+0)	Jeanine Jung; Germany	46:47.2 (0+1+0+2)
6 km sprint details	Maria Kossinova; Russia	28:14.5 (2+0)	Anna Boulygina; Russia	28:19.6 (1+1)	Jeanine Jung; Germany	28:24.2 (1+1)
7.5 km pursuit details	Maria Kossinova; Russia	37:25.8 (1+0+1+1)	Anastasiya Shipulina; Russia	38:07.9 (1+0+0+2)	Anna Boulygina; Russia	38:43.5 (1+0+3+2)
3 × 6 km relay details	Russia; Anna Boulygina; Anastasiya Shipulina; Maria Kossinova	1:17:17.8 (0+3) (0+1) (0+3) (0+0) (1+3) (1+3)	Germany; Anne Preußler; Friederike Göbel; Jeanine Jung	1:18:38.8 (0+1) (0+1) (0+2) (0+3) (1+3) (0+0)	Czech Republic; Lada Dušková; Petra Moravcová; Tereza Hlavsová	1:19:49.0 (0+0) (1+3) (0+3) (0+1) (0+2) (0+1)

=== Junior Women ===
Event:	Gold:	Time	Silver:	Time	Bronze:	Time
12.5 km individual details	Ute Niziak; Germany	47:25.9 (0+0+0+0)	Nadezhda Chastina; Russia	49:38.5 (1+0+1+0)	Liudmila Ananko; Belarus	49:39.0 (0+2+0+0)
7.5 km sprint details	Liudmila Ananko; Belarus	28:44.7 (0+0)	Yana Romanova; Russia	28:59.2 (0+0)	Ute Niziak; Germany	29:08.6 (1+0)
10 km pursuit details	Ute Niziak; Germany	50:00.8 (0+2+1+1)	Yana Romanova; Russia	50:56.6 (1+1+2+0)	Magda Rezlerová; Czech Republic	51:04.2 (0+0+2+1)
3 × 6 km relay details	Russia; Yana Romanova; Uliana Denisova; Nadezhda Chastina	1:15:40.1 (0+1) (0+0) (1+3) (0+1) (0+2) (0+0)	Germany; Jenny Adler; Katharina Echter; Ute Niziak	1:15:54.0 (0+3) (0+0) (0+0) (0+2) (1+3) (0+0)	Czech Republic; Klara Moravcová; Lenka Votočková; Magda Rezlerová	1:04:15.1 (0+0) (0+3) (0+1) (0+2) (0+0) (0+3)

=== Youth Men ===
Event:	Gold:	Time	Silver:	Time	Bronze:	Time
12.5 km individual details	Simon Fourcade; France	44:19.5 (0+0+0+1)	Robert Wick; Germany	44:35.1 (0+1+0+1)	Emil Hegle Svendsen; Norway	45:30.4 (1+0+1+1)
7.5 km sprint details	Andrei Doubassov; Russia	25:31.4 (1+1)	Kiril Vasilev; Bulgaria	25:53.0 (0+0)	Christoph Knie; Germany	26:00.4 (2+0)
10 km pursuit details	Christoph Knie; Germany	46:14.8 (0+0+1+2)	Oleg Berezhnoy; Ukraine	46:53.2 (3+1+0+0)	Emil Hegle Svendsen; Norway	47:34.7 (1+0+1+3)
3 × 7.5 km relay details	Russia; Vladislav Moiseev; Ivan Patchenko; Andrei Doubassov	1:14:02.9 (0+0 (1+3) (0+1) (2+3) (0+0) (0+1)	Germany; Robert Wick; Jens Zimmer; Christoph Knie	1:14:03.3 (0+1) (1+3) (0+1) (0+1) (0+1) (0+2)	Ukraine; Andriy Atroshenko; Oleg Berezhnoy; Igor Yashchenko	1:15:59.9 (0+2) (0+0) (0+0) (0+2) (0+0) (0+3)

=== Junior Men ===
Event:	Gold:	Time	Silver:	Time	Bronze:	Time
15 km individual details	Jouni Kinnunen; Finland	46:55.7 (0+0+0+1)	Miroslav Matiaško; Slovakia	47:30.7 (0+0+0+1)	Ondřej Moravec; Czech Republic	47:52.3 (1+1+0+1)
10 km sprint details	Michael Rösch; Germany	28:30.8 (0+0)	Michal Šlesingr; Czech Republic	28:34.4 (0+0)	Maxim Tchoudov; Russia	28:41.9 (0+0)
12.5 km pursuit details	Maxim Tchoudov; Russia	49:52.3 (0+0+1+2)	Michal Šlesingr; Czech Republic	50:48.7 (0+2+0+1)	Ondřej Moravec; Czech Republic	50:52.1 (2+0+1+0)
4 × 7.5 km relay details	Russia; Nikolai Kozlov; Sergey Sadovnikov; Oleg Milovanov; Maxim Tchoudov	1:35:24.5 (0+0) (0+2) (0+0) (0+0) (0+0) (0+3) (0+0) (0+3)	Germany; Hansjörg Reuter; Norbert Schiller; Steve Renner; Michael Rösch	1:37:29.6 (0+0) (0+2) (0+3) (2+3) (0+0) (0+3) (0+0) (0+1)	Czech Republic; Martin Balatka; Ondřej Moravec; Jaroslav Soukup; Michal Šlesingr	1:37:43.3 (1+3) (0+1) (0+0) (0+1) (0+2) (0+2) (0+1) (0+0)

== Medal table ==
Rank	Nation	Gold	Silver	Bronze	Total
1	Russia (RUS)	8	6	2	16
2	Germany (GER)	4	5	4	13
3	Czech Republic (CZE)	1	2	6	9
4	Belarus (BLR)	1	0	1	2
5	Finland (FIN)	1	0	0	1
5	France (FRA)	1	0	0	1
7	Ukraine (UKR)	0	1	1	2
8	Bulgaria (BUL)	0	1	0	1
8	Slovakia (SVK)	0	1	0	1
10	Norway (NOR)	0	0	2	2
Totals (10 entries)		16	16	16	48
