= Alexia Runggaldier =

Italian biathlete (born 1991)

Personal information
- Born: 27 November 1991 (age 34) Brixen, Italy
- Height: 1.73 m (5 ft 8 in)
- Weight: 59 kg (130 lb)

Sport

Professional information
- Sport: Biathlon
- Club: Gruppo Sportivo Fiamme Oro
- World Cup debut: 2011

Olympic Games
- Teams: 1 (2014)
- Medals: 0

World Championships
- Teams: 5 (2012, 2013, 2016, 2017, 2019)
- Medals: 1

World Cup
- Individual races: 89
Medal record
World Championships
Bronze medal – third place	2017 Hochfilzen	15 km individual
Junior World Championships
Silver medal – second place	2011 Nové Město	3 × 6 km relay
Silver medal – second place	2012 Kontiolahti	3 × 6 km relay
Youth World Championships
Bronze medal – third place	2008 Ruhpolding	3 × 6 km relay
Bronze medal – third place	2009 Canmore	3 × 6 km relay
European Championships
Silver medal – second place	2018 Ridnaun	15 km individual

Alexia Runggaldier (born 27 November 1991) is an Italian former biathlete. She competed at the Biathlon World Championships 2012 and 2013. She represented Italy at the 2014 Winter Olympics in Sochi and at the 2018 Winter Olympics in PyeongChang.

== Record ==
=== World Championships ===
Event	Individual	Sprint	Pursuit	Mass start	Relay	Mixed relay	Single mixed relay
(Germany) 2012 Ruhpolding	—	—	—	—	12th	—	—N/a
(Czech Republic) 2013 Nové Město	78th	37th	39th	—	—	—	—N/a
(Norway) 2016 Holmenkollen	10th	—	—	—	7th	—	—N/a
(Austria) 2017 Hochfilzen	Bronze	43rd	15th	9th	5th	—	—N/a
(Sweden) 2019 Östersund	61st	—	—	—	10th	—	—

=== Olympics ===
Event	Individual	Sprint	Pursuit	Mass start	Relay	Mixed relay
(Russia) 2014 Sochi	43rd	—	—	—	—	—
(South Korea) 2018 PyeongChang	33rd	—	—	—	—	—
