= Anna Frolina =

South Korean biathlete (born 1984)

Anna Frolina (Seo Anna)
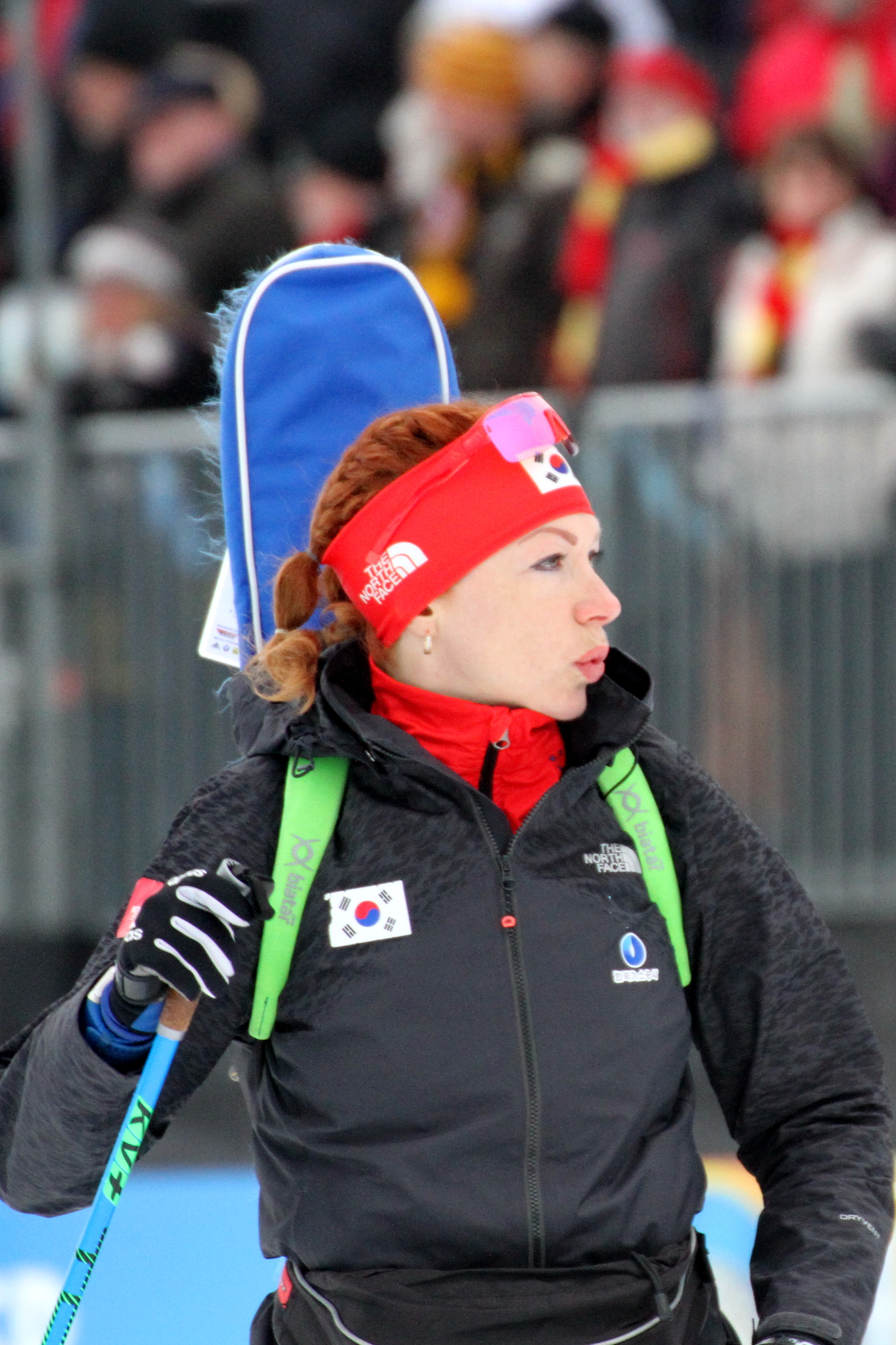

Personal information
- Full name: Anna Alekseyevna Frolina
- Born: 11 January 1984 (age 42) Salekhard, Yamalo-Nenets Autonomous Okrug, Soviet Union
- Height: 1.68 m (5 ft 6 in)

Sport
- Sport: Skiing

World Cup career
- Seasons: 2006-
- Indiv. podiums: 1
- Indiv. wins: 1
Medal record
Women's biathlon
Representing Russia
World Championships
Gold medal – first place	2009 Pyeongchang	4 × 6 km relay
Junior World Championships
Gold medal – first place	2005 Kontiolahti	10 km pursuit
Gold medal – first place	2005 Kontiolahti	3 × 6 km relay
Silver medal – second place	2005 Kontiolahti	7.5 km sprint
Youth World Championships
Gold medal – first place	2003 Kościelisko	3 × 6 km relay
Silver medal – second place	2002 Ridnaun	6 km sprint
Silver medal – second place	2003 Kościelisko	6 km sprint
Bronze medal – third place	2003 Kościelisko	7.5 km pursuit
- Updated on 4 February 2010

Anna Frolina, (Russian: Анна Алексеевна Фролина, Korean: 안나 프롤리나, née Boulygina Russian: Булыгина, born 11 January 1984) is a South Korean (since 2016) and Russian (until 2015) biathlete. Currently she resides at Khanty-Mansiysk, Russia.

== Career ==
Started competing in the World Cup in 2006–07 season ranking 31 in the Biathlon World Cup total score. She missed most of the 2007–08 season due to knee injury. In May 2008, she reappeared on the Russia's national team, and after summer training sessions was admitted to the World Cup. On 21 December 2008 in Hochfilzen came her first World Cup win shared with the relay teammates.

First World Cup win came in Antholz-Anterselva Pursuit on 24 January 2009, when she spectacularly stormed the last meters of the course to brush her rivals off the top spot.

Frolina (at time Boulygina) qualified for the 2010 Winter Olympics and made the strongest debut among the Russian Olympic first-timers in biathlon coming 4th in the sprint at Whistler Blackcomb Olympic park, just missing the podium by 1.2 seconds.

Her best result to date is a performance at the 2009 World Championships in Korea when she helped her teammates Svetlana Sleptsova, Olga Medvedtseva, Olga Zaitseva win the relay.

She represented South Korea from the 2016–17 season.
