= Michael Rösch =

German and Belgian former biathlete (born 1983)

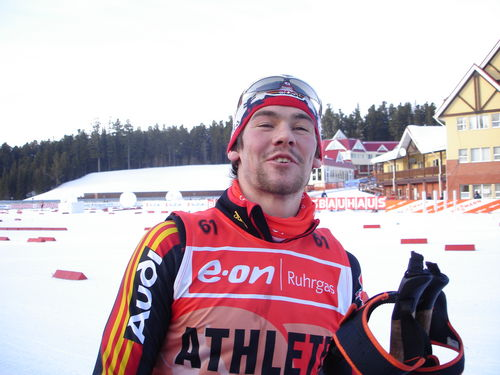

Personal information
- Born: 4 May 1983 (age 43)

Sport

Professional information
- Sport: Biathlon
Medal record
Men's biathlon
Representing Germany
Olympic Games
Gold medal – first place	2006 Torino	4 × 7.5 km relay
World Championships
Bronze medal – third place	2007 Antholz-Anterselva	4 × 7.5 km relay
Bronze medal – third place	2008 Östersund	4 × 7.5 km relay
Bronze medal – third place	2009 Pyeongchang	4 × 7.5 km relay
Summer World Championships
Gold medal – first place	2009 Oberhof	12.5 km pursuit
Gold medal – first place	2009 Oberhof	Mixed relay
Silver medal – second place	2009 Oberhof	10 km sprint
Junior World Championships
Gold medal – first place	2001 Khanty-Mansiysk	4 × 7.5 km relay
Gold medal – first place	2002 Ridnaun	4 × 7.5 km relay
Gold medal – first place	2003 Kościelisko	10 km sprint
Gold medal – first place	2004 Haute Maurienne	4 × 7.5 km relay
Silver medal – second place	2002 Ridnaun	15 km individual
Silver medal – second place	2003 Kościelisko	4 × 7.5 km relay
Silver medal – second place	2004 Haute Maurienne	10 km sprint
Silver medal – second place	2004 Haute Maurienne	12.5 km pursuit
Representing Belgium
Summer World Championships
Gold medal – first place	2014 Tyumen	12.5 km pursuit
Silver medal – second place	2014 Tyumen	10 km sprint

Michael Rösch (born 4 May 1983) is a German and Belgian (since 2014) former biathlete.

== Life and career ==
He is the son of the former biathlete Eberhard Rösch. He was junior world champion four times, three times in the relay and once in the sprint distance in 2003. On 16 December 2005 Rösch took his first official world cup podium with a second in the 10 km sprint, and on 15 January 2006 he won his first world cup victory in Ruhpolding when he beat Raphaël Poirée. In 2006, he won an Olympic gold medal with the German team in the relay. In addition, Rösch finished fifth in the overall standings in the 2005–06 Biathlon World Cup. He also took three World Championship bronze medals in relays and two race wins in the Biathlon World Cup.

However, in subsequent years Rösch suffered a dip in form, which led to him not being selected for the 2010 Winter Olympics. The decline in Rösch's results saw him being dropped by the German Ski Association (DSV) from international competition, both from the World Cup and the second-tier IBU Cup. When his improved performances saw him set to be picked for the 2012 Biathlon World Championships, the DSV did not select him, escalating disputes between himself and the Association and eventually leading him to switch nationalities and apply for Belgian citizenship. However, Rösch's naturalisation was not completed until January 2014, leaving him without enough time to qualify for the 2014 Winter Olympics. During this period, in order to rebuild his sporting career, he resigned from his position in the police force in Germany, and moved back in with his parents.

Whilst competing for Belgium, Rösch initially trained with Alexander Os and Lars Berger, who had similarly been dropped by the Norwegian Biathlon Association, in a training group they humorously nicknamed the "Feskslog"—Norwegian for "fish waste". He later switched to training with the Swiss biathlon squad. He made his debut for Belgium at an IBU Cup meeting in Martell, Italy, in March 2014, taking two top 20 finishes in the sprint and pursuit there. These performances earned him a wild card for the 2014–15 World Cup season. After switching countries, in August 2014 he became the first Belgian biathlete to win a global title when he took the gold medal in the pursuit at the Summer Biathlon World Championships in Tyumen, Russia, having already taken a silver in the sprint the previous day. Rösch also led the first Belgian World Cup relay team. In December 2016, he finished sixth in the pursuit at the Pokljuka World Cup meeting, his first top ten World Cup finish in solo competition since 2009: Rösch subsequently said that this result was "a bigger success than the Olympic gold medal. There was a lot more in it after all the setbacks". In a tearful interview by the finish line, he dedicated the result to his late former coach, Klaus Siebert. He also became the first Belgian to take a podium in the top two tiers of biathlon competition when he finished second in an IBU Cup race.

In 2018, he competed at his second Olympics, twelve years after his first, after crowdfunding the equivalent of over US$28,500 to enable him to do so. He finished in 23rd position in the pursuit, 38th in the sprint and 75th in the individual. In January 2019, at the Oberhof World Cup meeting, Rösch announced that he would retire from competition after the next weekend's following World Cup round in Ruhpolding, explaining that he felt it was the right time to retire as he was expecting to become a father for the first time, with his girlfriend being due to give birth in March.

== Biathlon results ==
All results are sourced from the International Biathlon Union.

=== Olympic Games ===
1 medals (1 gold)

Event	Individual	Sprint	Pursuit	Mass start	Relay
Representing Germany
(Italy) 2006 Turin	42nd	—	—	10th	Gold
Representing Belgium
(South Korea) 2018 Pyeongchang	75th	38th	23rd	—	—

=== World Championships ===
3 medals (3 bronze)

Event	Individual	Sprint	Pursuit	Mass start	Relay	Mixed relay
Representing Germany
(Austria) 2005 Hochfilzen	—	—	—	—	—	17th
(Slovenia) 2006 Pokljuka	—N/a	—N/a	—N/a	—N/a	—N/a	4th
(Italy) 2007 Antholz-Anterselva	—	18th	10th	23rd	Bronze	—
(Sweden) 2008 Östersund	25th	5th	7th	28th	Bronze	—
(South Korea) 2009 Pyeongchang	18th	14th	9th	5th	Bronze	—
Representing Belgium
(Finland) 2015 Kontiolahti	13th	21st	23rd	26th	—	—
(Norway) 2016 Oslo	45th	80th	—	—	24th	—
(Austria) 2017 Hochfilzen	55th	51st	31st	—	—	—

*During Olympic seasons competitions are only held for those events not included in the Olympic program.
**In 2005 the mixed relay, contested for the first time in the World Championships, was held in Khanty-Mansiysk, Russia.

=== Individual victories ===
2 victories (1 Sp, 1 Pu)

Season	Date	Location	Discipline	Level
2005–06; 1 victories (1 Pu)	15 January 2006	(Germany) Ruhpolding	12.5 km pursuit	Biathlon World Cup
2006–07; 1 victories (1 Sp)	15 March 2007	(Russia) Khanty-Mansiysk	10 km sprint	Biathlon World Cup

*Results are from UIPMB and IBU races which include the Biathlon World Cup, Biathlon World Championships and the Winter Olympic Games.
