= Biathlon Junior World Championships 2008 =

Biathlon event in Germany

The 2008 Biathlon Junior World Championships was held in Ruhpolding, Germany from January 26 to February 2 2008. There was to be a total of 16 competitions: sprint, pursuit, individual, mass start, and relay races for men and women.

== Medal winners ==
=== Youth Women ===
Event:	Gold:	Time	Silver:	Time	Bronze:	Time
10 km individual details	Dorothea Wierer; Italy	36:10.9 (0+0+0+1)	Nicole Wötzel; Germany	37:17.3 (0+1+1+0)	Natália Prekopová; Slovakia	37:53.0 (0+0+0+1)
6 km sprint details	Maren Hammerschmidt; Germany	20:21.6 (0+0)	Elise Ringen; Norway	20:23.8 (1+1)	Janin Hammerschmidt; Germany	20:31.3 (1+1)
7.5 km pursuit details	Janin Hammerschmidt; Germany	34:41.1 (1+0+4+1)	Sophie Boilley; France	35:01.1 (0+1+2+1)	Elise Ringen; Norway	35:09.0 (2+2+4+2)
3 × 6 km relay details	Germany; Maren Hammerschmidt; Janin Hammerschmidt; Nicole Wötzel	1:14:28.5 (0+1) (0+3) (0+0) (0+2) (0+1) (0+1)	Norway; Ada Ringen; Synnøve Solemdal; Elise Ringen	1:17:04.8 (0+1) (1+3) (1+3) (1+3) (0+0) (2+3)	Italy; Dorothea Wierer; Alexia Runggaldier; Monika Messner	1:17:58.6 (0+1) (0+2) (0+1) (0+2) (0+0) (0+2)

=== Junior Women ===
Event:	Gold:	Time	Silver:	Time	Bronze:	Time
12.5 km individual details	Susann König; Germany	47:39.0 (1+1+0+1)	Marie Laure Brunet; France	48:02.8 (0+1+0+1)	Iris Schwabl; Austria	49:05.8 (1+0+0+0)
7.5 km sprint details	Magdalena Neuner; Germany	24:38.9 (0+2)	Susann König; Germany	25:20.7 (0+1)	Marine Dusser; France	25:46.0 (0+0)
10 km pursuit details	Magdalena Neuner; Germany	37:22.6 (0+2+3+2)	Veronika Vítková; Czech Republic	39:50.3 (0+0+2+1)	Marie Laure Brunet; France	40:07.8 (2+0+2+2)
3 × 6 km relay details	Germany; Franziska Hildebrand; Susann König; Miriam Gössner	1:11:06.3 (0+0) (0+0) (0+2) (0+1) (0+0) (2+3)	France; Anaïs Bescond; Marine Dusser; Marie Laure Brunet	1:11:42.4 (0+2) (0+2) (0+2) (1+3) (0+0) (0+1)	Russia; Yuliya Kornilyuk; Olga Vilukhina; Anastasia Zagoruiko	1:12:24.6 (1+3) (0+2) (0+0) (0+1) (0+1) (1+3)

=== Youth Men ===
Event:	Gold:	Time	Silver:	Time	Bronze:	Time
12.5 km individual details	Ludwig Ehrhart; France	38:24.6 (0+0+1+0)	Manuel Müller; Germany	39:35.0 (0+1+1+0)	Mathieu Souchal; France	39:47.5 (0+0+0+1)
7.5 km sprint details	Vladiimir Alenishko; Belarus	22:53.8 (0+1)	Remi Borgeot; France	23:06.1 (0+0)	Ludwig Ehrhart; France	23:10.3 (0+1)
10 km pursuit details	Ludwig Ehrhart; France	33:10.6 (0+0+1+2)	Manuel Müller; Germany	33:48.3 (0+1+1+1)	Leif Nordgren; United States	34:12.0 (0+1+2+1)
3 × 7.5 km relay details	Germany; Benjamin Thym; Benedikt Doll; Felix Schuster	1:08:14.1 (0+1) (0+2) (0+2) (0+0) (0+1) (1+3)	Norway; Sondre Eide; Erlend Bjøntegaard; Vegar Bergli	1:09:03.2 (0+0) (0+1) (0+0) (1+3) (0+2) (0+1)	Italy; Pietro Dutto; Lukas Hofer; Dominik Windisch	1:09:08.6 (0+0) (0+1) (0+2) (3+3) (0+3) (0+1)

=== Junior Men ===
Event:	Gold:	Time	Silver:	Time	Bronze:	Time
15 km individual details	Jean-Guillaume Béatrix; France	42:09.1 (1+0+0+0)	Anton Shipulin; Russia	42:09.7 (0+1+0+1)	Dmitriy Blinov; Russia	42:41.6 (0+0+1+0)
10 km sprint details	Anton Shipulin; Russia	24:47.7 (0+0)	Florian Graf; Germany	24:59.7 (0+1)	Arnd Peiffer; Germany	25:04.4 (0+2)
12.5 km pursuit details	Anton Shipulin; Russia	39:50.9 (0+0+0+0)	Florian Graf; Germany	41:28.1 (0+0+4+0)	Viktor Vasilyev; Russia	41:45.3 (0+0+2+2)
4 × 7.5 km relay details	Russia; Dmitriy Blinov; Anton Shipulin; Pavel Magazeev; Viktor Vasilyev	1:35:21.6 (0+1) (0+2) (0+1) (0+3) (0+0) (0+2) (0+1) (0+1)	Norway; Magnus L'Abeé-Lund; Dag Erik Kokkin; Anders Hennum; Aril Askestad	1:26:44.7 (0+0) (0+2) (0+1) (0+0) (0+3) (0+2) (0+0) (0+2)	Germany; Simon Schempp; Manuel Müller; Arnd Peiffer; Florian Graf	1:36:13.7 (0+1) (0+0) (0+3) (0+1) (0+1) (0+0) (0+1) (0+1)

== Medal table ==
* Host nation (Germany)

Rank	Nation	Gold	Silver	Bronze	Total
1	Germany (GER)*	8	6	3	17
2	France (FRA)	3	4	4	11
3	Russia (RUS)	3	1	3	7
4	Italy (ITA)	1	0	2	3
5	Belarus (BLR)	1	0	0	1
6	Norway (NOR)	0	4	1	5
7	Czech Republic (CZE)	0	1	0	1
8	Austria (AUT)	0	0	1	1
8	Slovakia (SVK)	0	0	1	1
8	United States (USA)	0	0	1	1
Totals (10 entries)		16	16	16	48
