= Florian Graf =

German biathlete

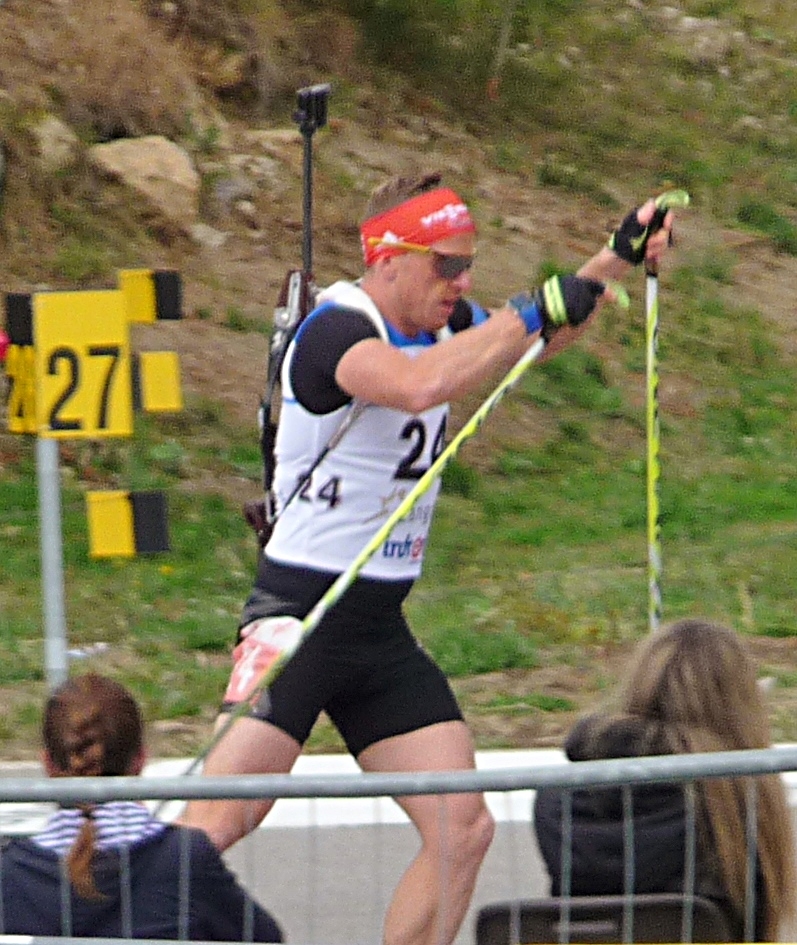
- Florian Graf (middle) at a biathlon in 2015

Personal information
- Full name: Florian Graf
- Born: 24 July 1988 (age 37) Freyung, West Germany
- Website: grafflorian.de

Sport

Professional information
- Sport: Biathlon
- Club: WSV Eppenschlag
- World Cup debut: 18 December 2010

World Championships
- Teams: 2 (2012, 2013)
- Medals: 0

World Cup
- Seasons: 2010–2018
- Individual victories: 0
- All victories: 0
- Individual podiums: 0
- All podiums: 2
Medal record
Men's biathlon
Representing Germany
European Championships
Gold medal – first place	2011 Ridanna	4 × 7.5 km relay
Bronze medal – third place	2014 Nové Město	4 × 7.5 km relay
Junior World Championships
Gold medal – first place	2009 Canmore	4 × 7.5 km relay
Silver medal – second place	2008 Ruhpolding	10 km sprint
Silver medal – second place	2008 Ruhpolding	12.5 km pursuit
Bronze medal – third place	2008 Ruhpolding	4 × 7.5 km relay
Youth World Championships
Gold medal – first place	2007 Martell	10 km pursuit
Silver medal – second place	2006 Presque Isle	7.5 km sprint
Bronze medal – third place	2007 Martell	7.5 km sprint
- Updated on 13 August 2017

Florian Graf (born 24 July 1988) is a retired German biathlete. He has won several medals at Junior World Championships, including two gold medals.

== Biathlon results ==
All results are sourced from the International Biathlon Union.

=== World Championships ===
Event	Individual	Sprint	Pursuit	Mass start	Relay	Mixed relay
(Germany) 2012 Ruhpolding	—	34th	38th	—	—	—
(Czech Republic) 2013 Nové Město	40th	—	—	—	—	—

*During Olympic seasons competitions are only held for those events not included in the Olympic program.

=== Junior/Youth World Championships ===
7 medals (2 gold, 3 silver, 2 bronze)

Event	Individual	Sprint	Pursuit	Relay
(United States) 2006 Presque Isle	28th	Silver	5th	—
(Italy) 2007 Martell-Val Martello	43rd	Bronze	Gold	—
(Germany) 2008 Ruhpolding	5th	Silver	Silver	Bronze
(Canada) 2009 Canmore	—	4th	8th	Gold
