= Ingela Andersson =

Swedish biathlete (born 1991)

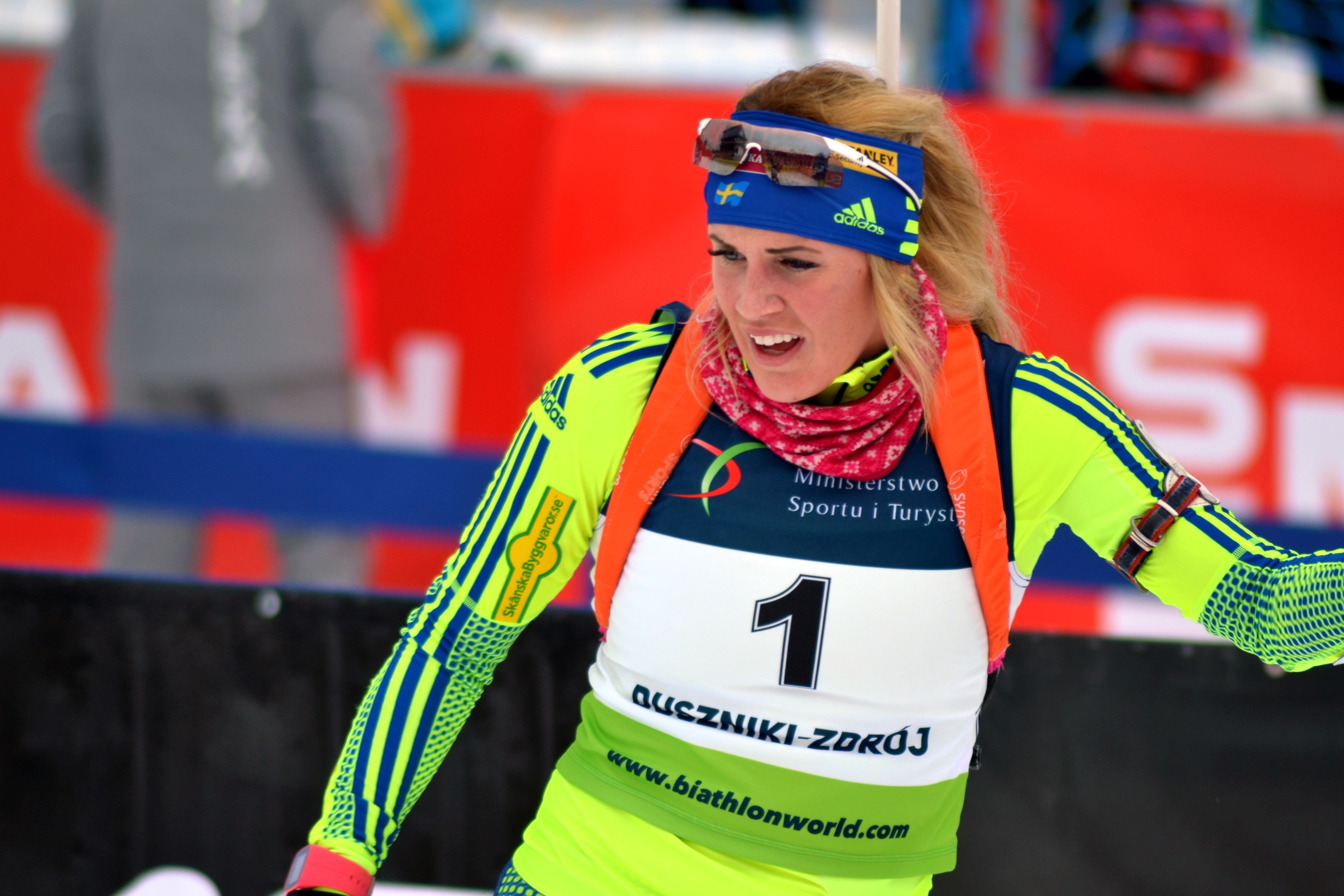
- Andersson at the European Championships in Duszniki-Zdrój in 2017

Personal information
- Nationality: Swedish
- Born: 16 July 1991 (age 34) Sollefteå, Sweden

Sport
- Country: Sweden
- Sport: Biathlon
Medal record
Junior World Championships
Bronze medal – third place	2011 Nové Město	7.5 km sprint
Youth World Championships
Silver medal – second place	2010 Torsby	6 km sprint
Silver medal – second place	2010 Torsby	7.5 km pursuit

Ingela Andersson (born 16 July 1991) is a Swedish biathlete. She resides in Östersund. She competed at the Biathlon World Championships 2013 in Nové Město na Moravě, and at the Biathlon World Championships 2016 in Oslo.
