= Thekla Brun-Lie =

Norwegian biathlete (born 1992)

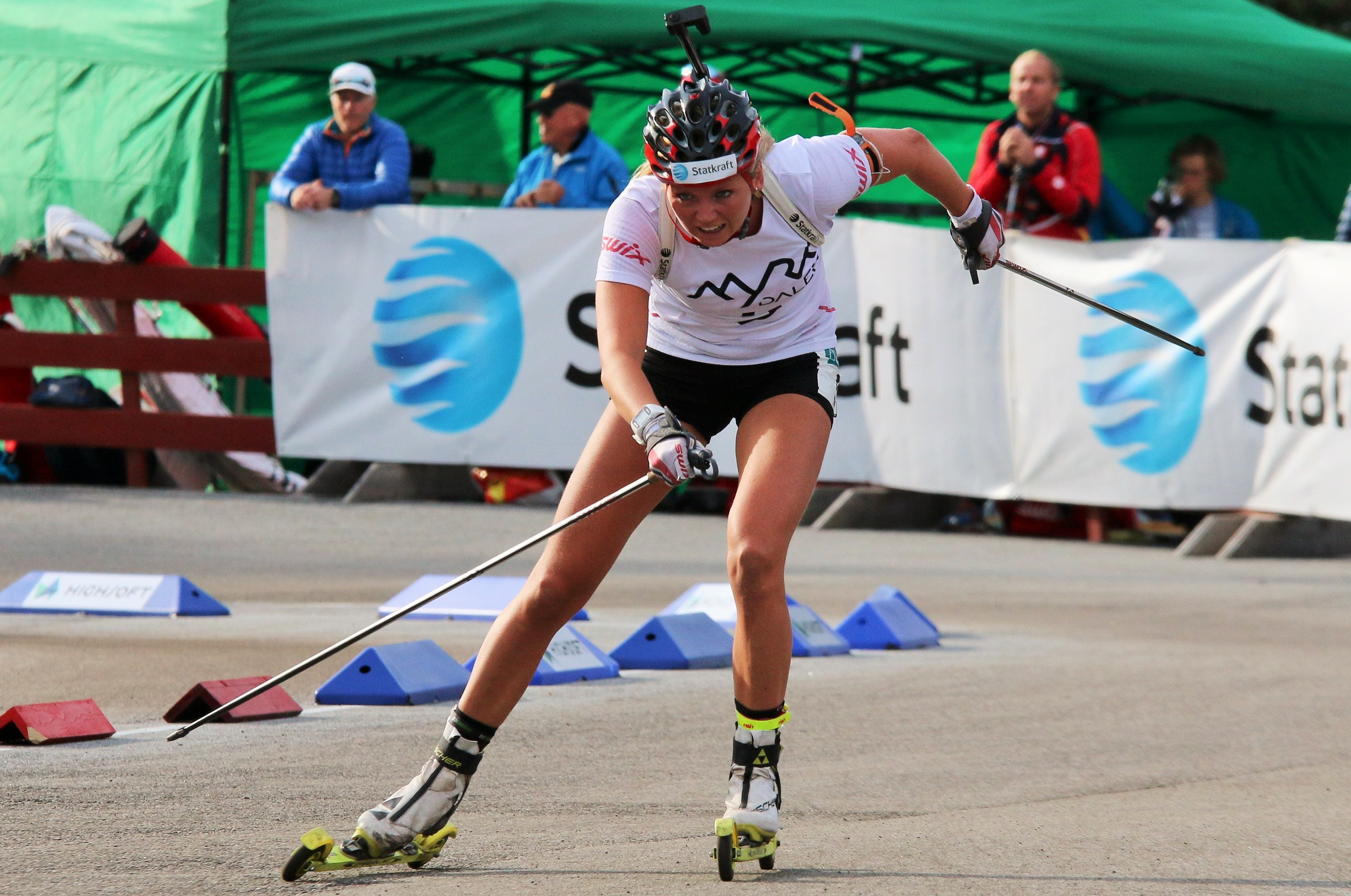

Personal information
- Full name: Thekla Charlotte Knudtzon Brun-Lie
- Nationality: Norwegian
- Born: 2 September 1992 (age 33) Oslo, Norway

Sport

Professional information
- Sport: Biathlon
- Club: SK Njård
Medal record
Women's biathlon
Representing Norway
European Championships
Gold medal – first place	2018 Ridnaun	Single mixed relay
Junior World Championships
Gold medal – first place	2012 Kontiolahti	3 × 6 km relay
Youth World Championships
Gold medal – first place	2010 Torsby	3 × 6 km relay
Gold medal – first place	2011 Nové Město	10 km individual

Thekla Charlotte Knudtzon Brun-Lie (born 2 September 1992) is a Norwegian former biathlete.

== Career ==
She competed at the 2018 IBU Open European Championships in Italy, where she won a gold medal in Single mixed relay along with Vetle Sjåstad Christiansen.

Her sister Celine Brun-Lie is an international cross-country skier.
