= Hilde Fenne =

Norwegian biathlete (born 1993)

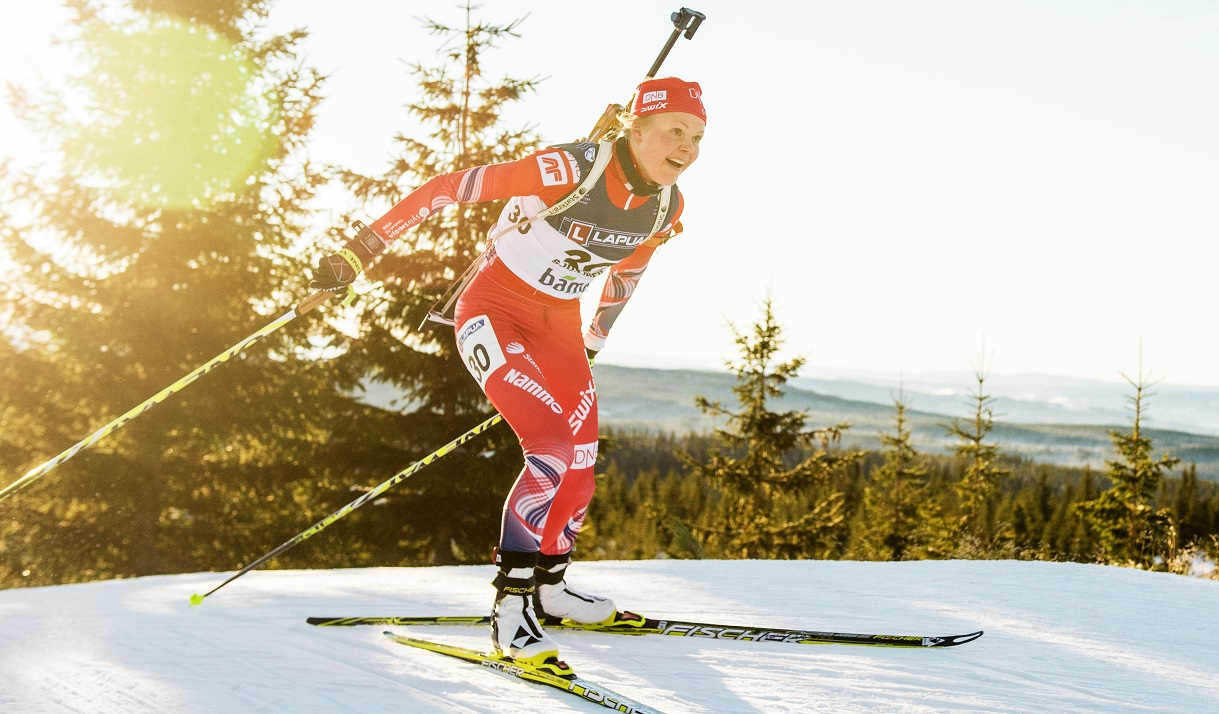
- Fenne in 2015

Personal information
- Born: 12 May 1993 (age 33)

Sport

Professional information
- Sport: Biathlon

World Championships
- Teams: 2 (2013, 2017)
- Medals: 1 (1 gold)
Medal record
Women's biathlon
Representing Norway
World Championships
Gold medal – first place	2013 Nové Město	4 × 6 km relay
European Championships
Bronze medal – third place	2014 Nové Město	4 × 6 km relay
Junior World Championships
Gold medal – first place	2012 Kontiolahti	3 × 6 km relay
Youth World Championships
Gold medal – first place	2012 Kontiolahti	6 km sprint
Bronze medal – third place	2012 Kontiolahti	10 km individual

Hilde Fenne (born 12 May 1993) is a Norwegian biathlete.

== Career ==
She took a bronze medal and a silver medal in mixed relay at the 2011 European Youth Winter Olympic Festival, and then two gold medals at the 2012 World Junior Championships. She made her Biathlon World Cup debut in November 2012 in Östersund.

She is also an able long-distance runner, who achieved her personal best of 10:14.21 minutes in the 3000 metres at the age of 17. She represents the club Voss IL.

She is a daughter of retired biathletes Gisle Fenne and Helga Øvsthus Fenne.
