= Biathlon Junior World Championships 2011 =

Biathlon event in the Czech Republic

The 2011 Biathlon Junior World Championships was held in Nové Město na Moravě, Czech Republic from January 27 to February 5 2011. There was to be a total of 16 competitions: sprint, pursuit, individual, mass start, and relay races for men and women.

== Schedule of events ==
Date	Time (CET)	Events
January 29	8:50	6 km youth women sprint
January 29	11:00	7.5 km junior women sprint
January 29	13:15	10 km junior men sprint
January 29	15:30	10 km youth men sprint
January 30	10:30	7.5 km youth women pursuit
January 30	11:30	10 km junior women pursuit
January 30	14:00	12.5 km junior men pursuit
January 30	15:00	10 km youth men pursuit
February 1	10:00	12.5 km youth men individual
February 1	13:30	10 km youth women individual
February 2	10:00	15 km junior men individual
February 2	13:30	12.5 km junior women individual
February 4	10:00	3 × 7.5 km youth men relay
February 4	13:30	3 × 6 km youth women relay
February 5	10:00	4 × 7.5 km junior men relay
February 5	13:30	3 × 6 km junior women relay

== Medal winners ==
=== Youth Women ===
Event:	Gold:	Time	Silver:	Time	Bronze:	Time
10 km individual details	Thekla Brun-Lie; Norway	33:31.7 (1+1+0+0)	Elena Badanina; Russia	33:42.9 (0+1+1+0)	Galina Vishnevskaya; Kazakhstan	34:08.3 (0+1+0+1)
6 km sprint details	Ekaterina Zubova; Russia	18:09.0 (0+1)	Anaïs Chevalier; France	18:15.4 (0+0)	Elena Badanina; Russia	18:40.9 (0+0)
7.5 km pursuit details	Ekaterina Zubova; Russia	26:24.1 (0+0+2+1)	Anaïs Chevalier; France	27:14.7 (0+1+1+0)	Elena Badanina; Russia	28:32.3 (0+1+2+1)
3 × 6 km relay details	Russia; Elena Badanina; Viktoriya Perminova; Ekaterina Zubova	58:26.2 (0+0) (0+0) (0+1) (0+0) (0+3) (0+1)	Ukraine; Yuliya Bryhynets; Anastasiya Merkushyna; Iryna Varvynets	59:45.0 (0+1) (0+3) (0+2) (0+1) (0+2) (0+0)	France; Manon Contin; Coline Varcin; Anaïs Chevalier	1:01:23.3 (0+0) (0+3) (0+0) (0+2) (0+2) (0+1)

=== Junior Women ===
Event:	Gold:	Time	Silver:	Time	Bronze:	Time
12.5 km individual details	Dorothea Wierer; Italy	40:56.8 (1+0+0+1)	Olga Galich; Russia	41:22.2 (0+1+0+0)	Florie Vigneron; France	42:11.5 (0+1+0+0)
7.5 km sprint details	Dorothea Wierer; Italy	22:17.9 (0+0)	Aleksandra Alikina; Russia	23:19.6 (1+1)	Ingela Andersson; Sweden	23:20.5 (0+0)
10 km pursuit details	Dorothea Wierer; Italy	32:54.0 (1+1+1+1)	Aleksandra Alikina; Russia	33:49.7 (1+0+1+3)	Laura Dahlmeier; Germany	34:03.3 (0+0+0+0)
3 × 6 km relay details	Russia; Aleksandra Alikina; Svetlana Perminova; Olga Galich	1:02:35.9 (0+2) (1+3) (0+1) (0+0) (0+2) (0+0)	Italy; Alexia Runggaldier; Nicole Gontier; Dorothea Wierer	1:03:53.4 (0+1) (0+0) (0+2) (0+2) (0+1) (0+1)	Germany; Laura Dahlmeier; Birgit Riesle; Carolin Leunig	1:04:32.1 (0+3) (0+1) (0+1) (0+1) (0+2) (1+3)

=== Youth Men ===
Event:	Gold:	Time	Silver:	Time	Bronze:	Time
12.5 km individual details	Pavel Hancharou; Belarus	35:54.3 (0+0+0+0)	Steffen Bartscher; Germany	36:42.5 (0+1+0+1)	Vetle Sjåstad Christiansen; Norway	37:37.0 (0+1+1+1)
7.5 km sprint details	Maxim Tsvetkov; Russia	19:53.4 (0+2)	Vetle Sjåstad Christiansen; Norway	20:11.4 (1+1)	Alexandr Loginov; Russia	20:19.7 (1+2)
10 km pursuit details	Maxim Tsvetkov; Russia	28:04.6 (1+0+1+1)	Vetle Sjåstad Christiansen; Norway	28:34.9 (1+0+1+2)	Alexandr Loginov; Russia	28:37.3 (1+1+1+1)
3 × 7.5 km relay details	Russia; Alexandr Loginov; Alexander Chernyshov; Maxim Tsvetkov	1:04:25.6 (1+3) (0+2) (0+2) (0+1) (0+1) (0+1)	Italy; Benjamin Plaickner; Thierry Chenal; Maikol Demetz	1:05:48.8 (0+0) (0+2) (0+1) (0+0) (0+0) (0+3)	Austria; Alexander Jakob; Thomas Haumer; Fabian Hoerl	1:06:30.3 (0+0) (0+2) (0+1) (0+0) (0+0) (0+3)

=== Junior Men ===
Event:	Gold:	Time	Silver:	Time	Bronze:	Time
15 km individual details	Simon Desthieux; France	41:36.6 (0+1+1+0)	Benedikt Doll; Germany	42:03.6 (1+1+0+2)	Nikolay Yakushov; Russia	42:09.0 (0+2+0+0)
10 km sprint details	Tom Barth; Germany	24:24.7 (0+0)	Johannes Kühn; Germany	24:40.9 (0+1)	Ludwig Ehrhart; France	24:50.5 (0+1)
12.5 km pursuit details	Johannes Kühn; Germany	34:42.0 (1+0+1+0)	Ludwig Ehrhart; France	35:13.0 (1+0+1+0)	Tom Barth; Germany	35:42.5 (1+1+2+0)
4 × 7.5 km relay details	Germany; Steffen Bartscher; Benedikt Doll; Johannes Kühn; Tom Barth	1:28:38.9 (0+1) (2+3) (0+1) (1+3) (0+2) (0+0) (0+0) (0+2)	Russia; Nikolay Yakushov; Alexandr Pechenkin; Ivan Kryukov; Dmitrii Diuzhev	1:28:56.5 (0+0) (0+3) (0+0) (1+3) (0+2) (2+3) (0+1) (0+2)	Norway; Erlend Bjøntegaard; Erling Aalvik; Kristoffer Skjelvik; Vetle Sjåstad Christiansen	1:30:25.2 (0+1) (1+3) (0+0) (1+3) (0+3) (0+3) (0+1) (0+1)

== Medal table ==
Rank	Nation	Gold	Silver	Bronze	Total
1	Russia (RUS)	7	5	5	17
2	Germany (GER)	3	3	3	9
3	Italy (ITA)	3	2	0	5
4	France (FRA)	1	3	3	7
5	Norway (NOR)	1	2	2	5
6	Belarus (BLR)	1	0	0	1
7	Ukraine (UKR)	0	1	0	1
8	Austria (AUT)	0	0	1	1
8	Kazakhstan (KAZ)	0	0	1	1
8	Sweden (SWE)	0	0	1	1
Totals (10 entries)		16	16	16	48
