= Biathlon Junior World Championships 2010 =

Biathlon event in Sweden

The 2010 Biathlon Junior World Championships was held in Torsby, Sweden from January 27 to February 2 2010. There was to be a total of 16 competitions: sprint, pursuit, individual, mass start, and relay races for men and women.

== Medal winners ==
=== Youth Women ===
| Event: | Gold: | Time | Silver: | Time | Bronze: | Time |
|---|---|---|---|---|---|---|
| 10 km individual details | Olga Iakushova; Russia | 33:35.7 (0+2+0+0) | Elena Badanina; Russia | 35:01.1 (0+0+0+2) | Rose-Marie Cote; Canada | 35:22.5 (0+0+0+0) |
| 6 km sprint details | Elena Badanina; Russia | 18:28.1 (0+0) | Ingela Andersson; Sweden | 18:45.1 (0+1) | Monika Hojnisz; Poland | 18:49.5 (1+0) |
| 7.5 km pursuit details | Elena Badanina; Russia | 26:26.5 (0+0+0+2) | Ingela Andersson; Sweden | 26:32.0 (2+0+0+1) | Monika Hojnisz; Poland | 6:38.0 (2+1+0+0) |
| 3 × 6 km relay details | Norway; Thekla Brun-Lie; Marion Rønning Huber; Anne-Tine Markset | 57:45.6 (0+2) (0+0) (0+0) (0+0) (0+1) (0+1) | Russia; Elena Badanina; Natalia Shalaeva; Olga Iakushova | 58:09.5 (0+3) (0+2) (0+1) (1+3) (0+0) (0+3) | Belarus; Iryna Kryuko; Dziyana Maskalenka; Darya Nesterchik | 58:25.8 (0+0) (0+1) (0+1) (0+0) (0+0) (0+0) |

=== Junior Women ===
| Event: | Gold: | Time | Silver: | Time | Bronze: | Time |
|---|---|---|---|---|---|---|
| 12.5 km individual details | Réka Forika; Romania | 42:05.1 (0+0+0+0) | Karolin Horchler; Germany | 43:06.4 (0+0+0+0) | Leslie Mercier; France | 43:20.1 (1+0+0+0) |
| 7.5 km sprint details | Maren Hammerschmidt; Germany | 22:56.6 (0+0) | Sophie Boilley; France | 23:13.6 (0+1) | Synnøve Solemdal; Norway | 23:40.1 (0+3) |
| 10 km pursuit details | Sophie Boilley; France | 31:48.9 (1+1+1+0) | Nastassia Kalina; Russia | 32:11.0 (0+0+0+0) | Synnøve Solemdal; Norway | 32:22.2 (1+1+1+2) |
| 3 × 6 km relay details | Russia; Larisa Kuklina; Svetlana Perminova; Nastassia Kalina | 55:28.2 (0+0) (0+2) (0+0) (0+0) (0+0) (0+1) | Norway; Kaia Wøien Nicolaisen; Marie Hov; Synnøve Solemdal | 55:57.9 (0+1) (0+0) (0+0) (0+1) (0+1) (0+0) | Germany; Miriam Behringer; Maren Hammerschmidt; Nicole Wötzel | 55:58.1 (0+1) (0+2) (0+0) (0+2) (0+1) (0+0) |

=== Youth Men ===
| Event: | Gold: | Time | Silver: | Time | Bronze: | Time |
|---|---|---|---|---|---|---|
| 12.5 km individual details | Martin Maier; Austria | 38:15.2 (0+0+1+0) | Aleksandr Pechenkin; Russia | 38:40.3 (0+1+0+2) | Vetle Sjåstad Christiansen; Norway | 39:19.2 (1+2+0+0) |
| 7.5 km sprint details | Johannes Kühn; Germany | 20:10.4 (0+1) | Aleksandr Pechenkin; Russia | 20:39.9 (1+1) | Vetle Sjåstad Christiansen; Norway | 21:02.6 (1+1) |
| 10 km pursuit details | Aleksandr Pechenkin; Russia | 27:34.4 (0+0+0+1) | Johannes Kühn; Germany | 27:53.1 (0+1+1+2) | Ivan Pichuzhkin; Russia | 27:54.5 (0+0+1+2) |
| 3 × 7.5 km relay details | Russia; Alexandr Loginov; Ivan Pichuzhkin; Aleksandr Pechenkin | 1:04:24.3 (0+3) (0+1) (0+3) (0+2) (0+3) (0+3) | France; Antonin Guigonnat; Florent Claude; Simon Desthieux | 1:05:25.6 (0+0) (0+0) (0+1) (0+3) (0+2) (0+2) | Norway; Kristian Ruud Nesheim; Erving Ålvik; Vetle Sjåstad Christiansen | 1:06:07.6 (0+2) (0+3) (0+3) (0+3) (0+1) (0+2) |

=== Junior Men ===
| Event: | Gold: | Time | Silver: | Time | Bronze: | Time |
|---|---|---|---|---|---|---|
| 15 km individual details | Yann Guigonnet; France | 43:11.3 (0+0+1+0) | Michael Galassi; Italy | 43:51.1 (1+1+0+1) | Tom Barth; Germany | 43:59.4 (0+0+0+0) |
| 10 km sprint details | Evgeny Petrov; Russia | 25:12.5 (0+0) | Manuel Müller; Germany | 25:14.5 (0+1) | Tom Barth; Germany | 25:51.9 (0+1) |
| 12.5 km pursuit details | Manuel Müller; Germany | 35:38.3 (0+0+1+0) | Vladimir Alenishko; Belarus | 36:28.4 (0+1+2+0) | Evgeny Petrov; Russia | 36:8.9 (3+0+0+2) |
| 4 × 7.5 km relay details | Germany; Tom Barth; Johannes Kühn; Benedikt Doll; Manuel Müller | 1:25:15.2 (0+2) (0+2) (0+2) (0+2) (0+1) (0+3) (0+0) (0+0) | France; Remi Borgeot; Mathieu Souchal; Ludwig Ehrhart; Yann Guigonnet | 1:26:34.5 (0+1) (0+1) (0+1) (0+1) (0+0) (0+0) (0+1) (0+2) | Russia; Nazir Rabadanov; Evgeny Petrov; Andrey Turgenev; Dmitry Kononov | 1:26:50.0 (0+0) (0+0) (0+1) (2+3) (0+2) (0+0) (0+0) (0+3) |

== Medal table ==
* Host nation (Sweden)

| Rank | Nation | Gold | Silver | Bronze | Total |
|---|---|---|---|---|---|
| 1 | Russia (RUS) | 7 | 5 | 3 | 15 |
| 2 | Germany (GER) | 4 | 3 | 3 | 10 |
| 3 | France (FRA) | 2 | 3 | 1 | 6 |
| 4 | Norway (NOR) | 1 | 1 | 5 | 7 |
| 5 | Austria (AUT) | 1 | 0 | 0 | 1 |
| 5 | Romania (ROU) | 1 | 0 | 0 | 1 |
| 7 | Sweden (SWE)* | 0 | 2 | 0 | 2 |
| 8 | Belarus (BLR) | 0 | 1 | 1 | 2 |
| 9 | Italy (ITA) | 0 | 1 | 0 | 1 |
| 10 | Poland (POL) | 0 | 0 | 2 | 2 |
| 11 | Canada (CAN) | 0 | 0 | 1 | 1 |
| Totals (11 entries) | | 16 | 16 | 16 | 48 |
