= Biathlon Junior World Championships 2012 =

Biathlon event in Finland

The 2012 Biathlon Junior World Championships was held in Kontiolahti, Finland from January 20 to January 26, 2012. There was to be a total of 16 competitions: sprint, pursuit, individual, mass start, and relay races for men and women.

== Medal winners ==
=== Youth Women ===
| Event: | Gold: | Time | Silver: | Time | Bronze: | Time |
|---|---|---|---|---|---|---|
| 10 km individual details | Julia Bartolomäs; Germany | 40:35.2 (1+0+1+1) | Galina Vishnevskaya; Kazakhstan | 40:54.4 (0+2+0+2) | Hilde Fenne; Norway | 41:05.0 (1+3+1+1) |
| 6 km sprint details | Hilde Fenne; Norway | 18:48.3 (0+1) | Niya Dimitrova; Bulgaria | 19:07.9 (0+0) | Lisa Theresa Hauser; Austria | 19:41.4 (0+1) |
| 7.5 km pursuit details | Grete Gaim; Estonia | 27:18.1 (0+0+1+0) | Julia Ransom; Canada | 27:24.9 (0+0+0+2) | Annika Knoll; Germany | 27:35.6 (0+0+1+0) |
| 3 × 6 km relay details | Ukraine; Yuliya Zhuravok; Yuliya Brhyhnets; Anastasiya Merkushyna | 1:03:53.2 (0+0) (0+2) (0+0) (0+0) (0+0) (0+2) | Sweden; Linn Persson; Hanna Öberg; Lotten Sjödén | 1:04:51.4 (0+2) (0+0) (0+2) (0+1) (0+0) (0+1) | Austria; Christina Rieder; Julia Reisinger; Lisa Theresa Hauser | 1:04:52.6 (0+1) (0+0) (0+0) (0+1) (0+3) (0+0) |

=== Junior Women ===
| Event: | Gold: | Time | Silver: | Time | Bronze: | Time |
|---|---|---|---|---|---|---|
| 12.5 km individual details | Chardine Sloof; Netherlands | 43:44.5 (0+0+0+1) | Monika Hojnisz; Poland | 43:51.0 (0+1+0+1) | Elena Badanina; Russia | 44:19.2 (0+1+0+2) |
| 7.5 km sprint details | Elena Ankudinova; Russia | 22:27.9 (0+0) | Anaïs Chevalier; France | 22:35.9 (0+0) | Margarita Vasileva; Russia | 22:44.1 (1+0) |
| 10 km pursuit details | Chardine Sloof; Netherlands | 34:52.3 (0+0+0+0) | Olga Iakushova; Russia | 35:24.3 (1+0+0+2) | Iryna Kryuko; Belarus | 35:35.4 (0+2+1+0) |
| 3 × 6 km relay details | Norway; Thekla Brun-Lie; Hilde Fenne; Marion Rønning Huber | 1:01:37.6 (0+1) (0+1) (0+2) (0+1) (0+1) (0+3) | Italy; Alexia Runggaldier; Giulia Collavo; Nicole Gontier | 1:01:54.2 (0+2) (0+0) (0+1) (0+0) (0+3) (0+0) | Ukraine; Iryna Varvynets; Alla Gylenko; Iana Bondar | 1:02:01.6 (0+0) (0+0) (0+1) (0+1) (0+1) (1+3) |

=== Youth Men ===
| Event: | Gold: | Time | Silver: | Time | Bronze: | Time |
|---|---|---|---|---|---|---|
| 12.5 km individual details | Aristide Begue; France | 40:45.8 (0+1+0+0) | Maksim Ramanouski; Belarus | 41:33.6 (2+0+0+0) | Artem Tyshchenko; Ukraine | 42:00.7 (0+1+1+1) |
| 7.5 km sprint details | Johannes Thingnes Bø; Norway | 19:15.0 (1+1) | Maksim Ramanouski; Belarus | 20:05.8 (1+0) | Artem Tyshchenko; Ukraine | 20:07.6 (0+0) |
| 10 km pursuit details | Johannes Thingnes Bø; Norway | 29:13.6 (0+1+0+2) | Matthias Dorfer; Germany | 31:14.0 (0+0+0+0) | Maksim Ramanouski; Belarus | 31:32.0 (0+1+1+0) |
| 3 × 7.5 km relay details | France; Clemet Dumont; Florian Rivot; Aristide Begue | 1:06:44.3 (0+0) (0+0) (0+3) (0+3) (0+2) (0+3) | Sweden; Per Niklas Forsberg; Victor Olsson; Robert Sjöström | 1:07:22.5 (0+3) (0+1) (0+2) (0+3) (0+2) (0+1) | Germany; Niklas Homberg; Maximilian Janke; Matthias Dorfer | 1:07:39.9 (0+1) (0+0) (0+3) (0+0) (1+3) (1+3) |

=== Junior Men ===
| Event: | Gold: | Time | Silver: | Time | Bronze: | Time |
|---|---|---|---|---|---|---|
| 15 km individual details | Kurtis Wenzel; Canada | 44:09.2 (0+1+0+0) | Marius Hol; Norway | 44:52.0 (0+0+0+2) | Alexandr Loginov; Russia | 45:07.2 (1+1+1+0) |
| 10 km sprint details | Maxim Tsvetkov; Russia | 25:15.0 (1+0) | Florent Claude; France | 25:20.3 (1+0) | Simon Desthieux; France | 25:22.3 (0+0) |
| 12.5 km pursuit details | Maxim Tsvetkov; Russia | 33:20.3 (0+0+0+0) | Vetle Sjåstad Christiansen; Norway | 35:02.9 (0+0+1+1) | Alexandr Loginov; Russia | 35:06.8 (0+0+1+2) |
| 4 × 7.5 km relay details | Norway; Erling Ålvik; Johannes Thingnes Bø; Marius Hol; Vetle Sjåstad Christiansen | 1:21:50.4 (0+2) (0+1) (0+0) (0+1) (0+2) (0+2) (0+0) (0+2) | Czech Republic; Vlastimil Vávra; Matěj Krupčík; Michal Żak; Michal Krčmář | 1:23:13.9 (0+0) (0+1) (0+0) (0+2) (0+0) (0+0) (0+2) (0+1) | France; Antonin Guigonnat; Baptiste Jouty; Florent Claude; Simon Desthieux | 1:23:14.12 (0+0) (1+3) (0+1) (0+1) (0+3) (0+3) (0+1) (1+3) |

== Medal table ==
| Rank | Nation | Gold | Silver | Bronze | Total |
|---|---|---|---|---|---|
| 1 | Norway (NOR) | 5 | 2 | 1 | 8 |
| 2 | Russia (RUS) | 3 | 1 | 4 | 8 |
| 3 | France (FRA) | 2 | 2 | 2 | 6 |
| 4 | Netherlands (NED) | 2 | 0 | 0 | 2 |
| 5 | Germany (GER) | 1 | 1 | 2 | 4 |
| 6 | Canada (CAN) | 1 | 1 | 0 | 2 |
| 7 | Ukraine (UKR) | 1 | 0 | 3 | 4 |
| 8 | Estonia (EST) | 1 | 0 | 0 | 1 |
| 9 | Belarus (BLR) | 0 | 2 | 2 | 4 |
| 10 | Sweden (SWE) | 0 | 2 | 0 | 2 |
| 11 | Bulgaria (BUL) | 0 | 1 | 0 | 1 |
| 11 | Czech Republic (CZE) | 0 | 1 | 0 | 1 |
| 11 | Italy (ITA) | 0 | 1 | 0 | 1 |
| 11 | Kazakhstan (KAZ) | 0 | 1 | 0 | 1 |
| 11 | Poland (POL) | 0 | 1 | 0 | 1 |
| 16 | Austria (AUT) | 0 | 0 | 2 | 2 |
| Totals (16 entries) | | 16 | 16 | 16 | 48 |
