= Réka Forika =

Romanian biathlete (born 1989)

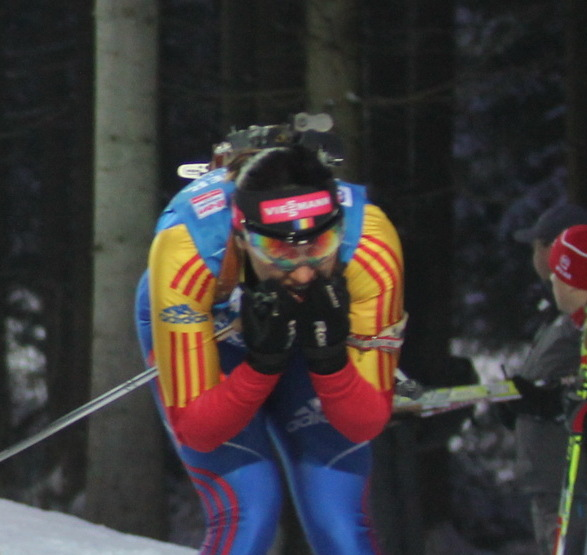
- Women's Relay at the 2013 Biathlon World Championships in Nové Město na Moravě; Reka Ferencz

Personal information
- Nationality: Romanian
- Born: 29 March 1989 (age 37)

Sport
- Country: Romania
- Sport: Biathlon
Medal record
Junior World Championships
Gold medal – first place	2010 Torsby	12.5 km individual

Réka Forika (born 29 March 1989 in Gheorgheni as Réka Ferencz) is a Romanian biathlete of Hungarian ethnicity.

== Career ==
Ferencz's biggest result so far is the IBU Junior World Championships title, which she achieved at the Biathlon Junior World Championships 2010 in the 12.5 km individual event. By winning the competition she also qualified for the 2010 Winter Olympics, where she ranked 74th in the 15 km distance race and was member of the Romanian 4×6 km relay team that finished tenth out of the 19 competing nations.
