= Biathlon Junior World Championships =

Annual winter sports competition

- Status: active
- Genre: sports event
- Date: January-February
- Frequency: annual
- Location: various
- Inaugurated: 1967 (men); 1989 (women)
- Organiser: IBU

Biathlon Junior World Championships were first held in 1967 for men and in 1989 for women. According to the International Biathlon Union rules, biathletes qualify as Junior if they turn 20, 21 or 22 during the season from November to October, they qualify as Youth when they turn 17, 18 or 19 during the season.

== History ==
The first venue was Altenberg (then in East Germany) and the age limit of the participating athletes was 20 years (under 21, now under 22). The Biathlon Junior World Championships from 1967 to 1983 were held in the same period and in one venue as the Biathlon World Championships (men, except olympic years, 1968, 1972, 1976 and 1980), and from 1984 to 1988 in the same period and in one venue as the Biathlon Women World Championships. Women junior competitions were introduced in 1989 when the Junior World Championships were, for the first time, organized independently from the senior championships (men or women). Youth World Championships (under 19) were introduced in 2002.

== Editions ==
Junior and youth competitions were held at the following locations:

- 1967: (East Germany) Altenberg
- 1968: (Sweden) Luleå
- 1969: (Poland) Zakopane
- 1970: (Sweden) Östersund
- 1971: (Finland) Hämeenlinna
- 1972: (Switzerland) Linthal
- 1973: (United States) Lake Placid
- 1974: (Soviet Union) Minsk
- 1975: (Italy) Antholz
- 1976: (Soviet Union) Minsk
- 1977: (Norway) Lillehammer
- 1978: (Austria) Hochfilzen
- 1979: (Germany) Ruhpolding
- 1980: (Socialist Federal Republic of Yugoslavia) Sarajevo
- 1981: (Finland) Lahti
- 1982: (Soviet Union) Minsk
- 1983: (Italy) Antholz
- 1984: (France) Chamonix
- 1985: (Switzerland) Egg am Etzel
- 1986: (Sweden) Falun
- 1987: (Finland) Lahti
- 1988: (France) Chamonix
- 1989: (Norway) Voss
- 1990: (Finland) Sodankylä
- 1991: (Hungary) Galyatető
- 1992: (Canada) Canmore
- 1993: (Germany) Ruhpolding
- 1994: (Slovakia) Osrblie
- 1995: (Switzerland) Andermatt
- 1996: (Finland) Kontiolahti
- 1997: (Italy) Forni Avoltri
- 1998: (Canada) Valcartier
- 1999: (Slovenia) Pokljuka
- 2000: (Austria) Hochfilzen
- 2001: (Russia) Khanty-Mansiysk
- 2002: (Italy) Ridnaun
- 2003: (Poland) Kościelisko
- 2004: (France) Haute Maurienne Vanoise
- 2005: (Finland) Kontiolahti
- 2006: (United States) Presque Isle
- 2007: (Italy) Martell
- 2008: (Germany) Ruhpolding
- 2009: (Canada) Canmore, Alberta
- 2010: (Sweden) Torsby
- 2011: (Czech Republic) Nové Město na Moravě
- 2012: (Finland) Kontiolahti
- 2013: (Austria) Obertilliach
- 2014: (United States) Presque Isle
- 2015: (Belarus) Minsk
- 2016: (Romania) Cheile Grădiştei
- 2017: (Slovakia) Osrblie
- 2018: (Estonia) Otepää
- 2019: (Slovakia) Osrblie
- 2020: (Switzerland) Lenzerheide
- 2021: (Austria) Obertilliach
- 2022: (United States) Soldier Hollow
- 2023: (Kazakhstan) Schuchinsk
- 2024: (Estonia) Otepää
- 2025: (Sweden) Östersund
- 2026: (Germany) Arber

== Winners (junior events) ==
=== Men's results ===
Missing : 1967 - 1996

Year	Host	Individual	Sprint	Pursuit	Relay
1997	(Italy) Forni Avoltri	(Sweden) Erik Lundström	(United States) Jay Hakkinen	no competition	Norway
1998	(Canada) Valcartier	(Germany) Joern Wollschlaeger	(Russia) Andrei Prokunin	no competition	Germany
1999	(Slovenia) Pokljuka	(Norway) Syver Berg-Domaas	(Norway) Syver Berg-Domaas	(Norway) Syver Berg-Domaas	Sweden
2000	(Austria) Hochfilzen	(Germany) Fabian Mund	(Germany) Fabian Mund	(Germany) Fabian Mund	Germany
2001	(Russia) Khanty-Mansiysk	(Belarus) Vitaly Chernychev	(Germany) Andreas Birnbacher	(Germany) Andreas Birnbacher	Germany
2002	(Italy) Ridnaun	(Austria) Simon Eder	(Sweden) Mattias Nilsson	(Czech Republic) Michal Šlesingr	Germany
2003	(Poland) Kościelisko	(Finland) Jouni Kinnunen	(Germany) Michael Rösch	(Russia) Maxim Tchoudov	Russia
2004	(France) Haute Maurienne	(Germany) Hansjörg Reuter	(France) Simon Fourcade	(France) Simon Fourcade	Germany
2005	(Finland) Kontiolahti	(Norway) Emil Hegle Svendsen	(Norway) Emil Hegle Svendsen	(France) Simon Fourcade	Germany
2006	(United States) Presque Isle	(Russia) Evgeny Ustyugov	(Czech Republic) Petr Hradecký	(Russia) Evgeny Ustyugov	France
2007	(Italy) Martell	(Belarus) Evgeny Abramenko	(Germany) Christoph Stephan	(Germany) Christoph Stephan	Germany
2008	(Germany) Ruhpolding	(France) Jean-Guillaume Béatrix	(Russia) Anton Shipulin	(Russia) Anton Shipulin	Russia
2009	(Canada) Canmore	(Germany) Manuel Müller	(Italy) Lukas Hofer	(Italy) Lukas Hofer	Germany
2010	(Sweden) Torsby	(France) Yann Guigonnet	(Russia) Evgeny Petrov	(Germany) Manuel Müller	Germany
2011	(Czech Republic) Nové Město	(France) Simon Desthieux	(Germany) Tom Barth	(Germany) Johannes Kühn	Germany
2012	(Finland) Kontiolahti	(Canada) Kurtis Wenzel	(Russia) Maxim Tsvetkov	(Russia) Maxim Tsvetkov	Norway
2013	(Austria) Obertilliach	(Russia) Alexandr Loginov	(Russia) Alexandr Loginov	(Norway) Johannes Thingnes Bø	Norway
2014	(United States) Presque Isle	(Norway) Tore Leren	(Russia) Alexander Povarnitsyn	(France) Fabien Claude	Germany
2015	(Belarus) Minsk	(France) Aristide Bègue	(Russia) Aleksandr Dediukhin	(Russia) Eduard Latypov	Russia
2016	(Romania) Cheile Gradistei	(Austria) Felix Leitner	(Austria) Felix Leitner	(United States) Sean Doherty	Russia
2017	(Slovakia) Osrblie	(Norway) Sindre Pettersen	(Russia) Igor Malinovskii	(Russia) Igor Malinovskii	Russia
2018	(Estonia) Otepää	(Russia) Igor Malinovskii	(Russia) Vasily Tomshin	(Norway) Sverre Dahlen Aspenes	Russia
2019	(Slovakia) Osrblie	(France) Martin Bourgeois République	(Norway) Vebjørn Sørum	(Norway) Vebjørn Sørum	Russia
2020	(Switzerland) Lenzerheide	(Germany) Max Barchewitz	(Norway) Vebjørn Sørum	(Germany) Danilo Riethmüller	Russia
2021	(Austria) Obertilliach	(Germany) Philipp Lipowitz	(France) Emilien Claude	(France) Emilien Claude	France
2022	(United States) Soldier Hollow	(Czech Republic) Jonáš Mareček	(Norway) Martin Nevland	(Norway) Martin Nevland	France
2023	(Kazakhstan) Shchuchinsk	(Germany) Benjamin Menz	(New Zealand) Campbell Wright	(Norway) Martin Nevland	Norway
Year	Host	Individual	Sprint	Mass start 60	Relay
2024	(Estonia) Otepää	(Germany) Leonhard Pfund	(Norway) Isak Frey	(Norway) Sivert Gerhardsen	Norway
2025	(Sweden) Östersund	(Norway) Sivert Gerhardsen	(Norway) Håvard Tosterud	(Norway) Kasper Kalkenberg	Norway
2026	(Germany) Arber	(Sweden) Philip Lindkvist-Fløtten	(Poland) Grzegorz Galica	(Norway) Kasper Kalkenberg	France

=== Women's results ===
Missing : 1989 - 1996

Year	Host	Individual	Sprint	Pursuit	Relay
1997	(Italy) Forni Avoltri	(Ukraine) Tetiana Rud	(Germany) Andrea Henkel	no competition	Norway
1998	(Canada) Valcartier	(Germany) Simone Hauswald	(Norway) Gro Istad-Kristiansen	no competition	Germany
1999	(Slovenia) Pokljuka	(Germany) Sabine Flatscher	(Germany) Martina Glagow	(Germany) Martina Glagow	Germany
2000	(Austria) Hochfilzen	(Russia) Irina Fomina	(Germany) Sabrina Buchholz	(Germany) Sabrina Buchholz	Germany
2001	(Russia) Khanty-Mansiysk	(Russia) Tatiana Moiseeva	(Germany) Romy Beer	(Germany) Jenny Adler	Russia
2002	(Italy) Ridnaun	(Russia) Nadezhda Chastina	(Germany) Kathrin Pfisterer	(Germany) Jenny Adler	Germany
2003	(Poland) Kościelisko	(Germany) Ute Niziak	(Belarus) Ludmila Ananko	(Germany) Ute Niziak	Russia
2004	(France) Haute Maurienne	(Germany) Jenny Adler	(Germany) Magdalena Neuner	(Germany) Jenny Adler	Germany
2005	(Finland) Kontiolahti	(Germany) Anne Preußler	(Germany) Magdalena Neuner	(Russia) Anna Boulygina	Russia
2006	(United States) Presque Isle	(France) Marion Blondeau	(Germany) Carolin Hennecke	(Germany) Magdalena Neuner	Germany
2007	(Italy) Martell	(Russia) Evgeniya Sedova	(Russia) Svetlana Sleptsova	(Russia) Svetlana Sleptsova	Germany
2008	(Germany) Ruhpolding	(Germany) Susann König	(Germany) Magdalena Neuner	(Germany) Magdalena Neuner	Germany
2009	(Canada) Canmore	(Germany) Nicole Wötzel	(Germany) Nicole Wötzel	(Germany) Miriam Gössner	Czech Republic
2010	(Sweden) Torsby	(Romania) Réka Ferencz	(Germany) Maren Hammerschmidt	(France) Sophie Boilley	Russia
2011	(Czech Republic) Nové Město	(Italy) Dorothea Wierer	(Italy) Dorothea Wierer	(Italy) Dorothea Wierer	Russia
2012	(Finland) Kontiolahti	(Netherlands) Chardine Sloof	(Russia) Elena Ankudinova	(Netherlands) Chardine Sloof	Norway
2013	(Austria) Obertilliach	(Germany) Laura Dahlmeier	(Germany) Laura Dahlmeier	(Russia) Olga Podchufarova	Germany
2014	(United States) Presque Isle	(Germany) Luise Kummer	(Russia) Evgeniya Pavlova	(Kazakhstan) Galina Vishnevskaya	Germany
2015	(Belarus) Minsk	(Ukraine) Yuliya Zhuravok	(France) Lena Arnaud	(Germany) Marie Heinrich	France
2016	(Romania) Cheile Gradistei	(Austria) Susanna Kurzthaler	(Sweden) Hanna Öberg	(Sweden) Hanna Öberg	Norway
2017	(Slovakia) Osrblie	(Canada) Megan Bankes	(Italy) Michela Carrara	(Russia) Valeriia Vasnetcova	Norway
2018	(Estonia) Otepää	(Poland) Kamila Żuk	(Poland) Kamila Żuk	(Czech Republic) Markéta Davidová	France
2019	(Slovakia) Osrblie	(China) Meng Fanqi	(Ukraine) Ekaterina Bekh	(Ukraine) Ekaterina Bekh	France
2020	(Switzerland) Lenzerheide	(Russia) Anastasiia Khaliullina	(Russia) Anastasia Shevchenko	(Russia) Anastasia Shevchenko	France
2021	(Austria) Obertilliach	(France) Camille Bened	(Switzerland) Amy Baserga	(Switzerland) Amy Baserga	France
2022	(United States) Soldier Hollow	(Germany) Lisa Maria Spark	(Czech Republic) Tereza Voborníková	(Czech Republic) Tereza Voborníková	Italy
2023	(Kazakhstan) Shchuchinsk	(Slovenia) Kaja Zorč	(Germany) Selina Grotian	(Germany) Selina Grotian	Germany
Year	Host	Individual	Sprint	Mass start 60	Relay
2024	(Estonia) Otepää	(Germany) Julia Tannheimer	(Sweden) Sara Andersson	(Germany) Julia Kink	Germany
2025	(Sweden) Östersund	(France) Célia Henaff	(Austria) Anna Andexer	(Sweden) Sara Andersson	France
2026	(Germany) Arber	(France) Thémice Fontaine	(Latvia) Estere Volfa	(Ukraine) Oleksandra Merkushyna	Germany

=== Mixed relay ===
Year	Host	Winner
2023	(Kazakhstan) Shchuchinsk	Germany; Johanna Puff; Selina Grotian; Benjamin Menz; Hans Köllner
2024	(Estonia) Otepää	Norway; Sivert Gerhardsen; Isak Frey; Maren Brännare-Gran; Gro Randby
2025	(Sweden) Östersund	Germany; Alma Siegismund; Lotta De Buhr; Fabian Kaskel; Linus Kesper
2026	(Germany) Arber	Latvia; Matīss Meirāns; Rihards Lozbers; Elza Bleidele; Estere Volfa

== Winners (youth events) ==
=== Men's results ===
Year	Host	Individual	Sprint	Pursuit	Relay
2002	(Italy) Ridnaun	(Germany) Christoph Knie	(Germany) Marcel Lorenc	(Russia) Andrei Doubassov	Germany
2003	(Poland) Kościelisko	(France) Simon Fourcade	(Russia) Andrei Doubassov	(Germany) Christoph Knie	Russia
2004	(France) Haute Maurienne	(Russia) Pavel Borisov	(Canada) Jean-Philippe Leguellec	(Norway) Emil Hegle Svendsen	Norway
2005	(Finland) Kontiolahti	(Russia) Viktor Vasilyev	(Norway) Anders Bratli	(Norway) Anders Bratli	Norway
2006	(United States) Presque Isle	(Norway) Tarjei Bø	(Norway) Arild Askestad	(Norway) Arild Askestad	Russia
2007	(Italy) Martell	(Poland) Łukasz Szczurek	(Russia) Talgat Golyashov	(Germany) Florian Graf	Austria
2008	(Germany) Ruhpolding	(France) Ludwig Ehrhart	(Belarus) Vladiimir Alenishko	(France) Ludwig Ehrhart	Germany
2009	(Canada) Canmore	(France) Ludwig Ehrhart	(Canada) Kurtis Wenzel	(Norway) Erlend Bjøntegaard	France
2010	(Sweden) Torsby	(Austria) Martin Maier	(Germany) Johannes Kühn	(Russia) Aleksandr Pechenkin	Russia
2011	(Czech Republic) Nové Město	(Belarus) Pavel Hancharou	(Russia) Maxim Tsvetkov	(Russia) Maxim Tsvetkov	Russia
2012	(Finland) Kontiolahti	(France) Aristide Begue	(Norway) Johannes Thingnes Bø	(Norway) Johannes Thingnes Bø	France
2013	(Austria) Obertilliach	(France) Aristide Begue	(France) Fabien Claude	(United States) Sean Doherty	Norway
2014	(United States) Presque Isle	(Russia) Yaroslav Kostyukov	(United States) Sean Doherty	(United States) Sean Doherty	Germany
2015	(Belarus) Minsk	(Russia) Kirill Streltsov	(Norway) Jonas Uglem Mobakken	(Austria) Felix Leitner	Russia
2016	(Romania) Cheile Gradistei	(Norway) Harald Øygard	(Russia) Igor Malinovskii	(Russia) Viacheslav Maleev	Norway
2017	(Slovakia) Osrblie	(Canada) Leo Grandbois	(France) Emilien Claude	(France) Emilien Claude	Norway
2018	(Estonia) Otepää	(Russia) Mikhail Pervushin	(Russia) Mikhail Pervushin	(Russia) Mikhail Pervushin	Russia
2019	(Slovakia) Osrblie	(Switzerland) Niklas Hartweg	(Slovenia) Alex Cisar	(Slovenia) Alex Cisar	Germany
2020	(Switzerland) Lenzerheide	(Norway) Martin Nevland	(Russia) Aleksei Kovalev	(Norway) Martin Nevland	Norway
2021	(Austria) Obertilliach	(Russia) Denis Irodov	(Russia) Denis Irodov	(Russia) Denis Irodov	Poland
2022	(United States) Soldier Hollow	(Finland) Arttu Heikkinen	(Estonia) Jakob Kulbin	(Slovakia) Jakub Borguľa	Norway
2023	(Kazakhstan) Shchuchinsk	(Slovakia) Jakub Borgula	(Norway) Kasper Kalkenberg	(Norway) Sivert Gerhardsen	Czech Republic
Year	Host	Individual	Sprint	Mass start 60	Relay
2024	(Estonia) Otepää	(France) Antonin Guy	(Norway) Kasper Kalkenberg	(Norway) Kasper Kalkenberg	Norway
2025	(Sweden) Östersund	(France) Antonin Guy	(Germany) Lukas Tannheimer	(France) Léo Carlier	France
2026	(Germany) Arber	(Latvia) Rihards Lozbers	(Slovakia) Markus Sklenárik	(Bulgaria) Georgi Dzhorgov	Italy

=== Women's results ===
Year	Host	Individual	Sprint	Pursuit	Relay
2002	(Italy) Ridnaun	(Norway) Kaja Eckhoff	(China) Dong Xue	(China) Dong Xue	China
2003	(Poland) Kościelisko	(Czech Republic) Tereza Hlavsová	(Russia) Maria Kossinova	(Russia) Maria Kossinova	Russia
2004	(France) Haute Maurienne	(France) Marion Blondeau	(Czech Republic) Michaela Balatková	(Kazakhstan) Inna Mozhevitina	France
2005	(Finland) Kontiolahti	(Russia) Svetlana Sleptsova	(Belarus) Darya Domracheva	(Belarus) Darya Domracheva	France
2006	(United States) Presque Isle	(Czech Republic) Veronika Vítková	(Russia) Olga Vilukhina	(Slovenia) Tamara Barič	Austria
2007	(Italy) Martell	(France) Laure Bosc	(France) Laure Bosc	(France) Marie Laure Brunet	France
2008	(Germany) Ruhpolding	(Italy) Dorothea Wierer	(Germany) Maren Hammerschmidt	(Germany) Janin Hammerschmidt	Germany
2009	(Canada) Canmore	(China) Zhang Yan	(China) Zhang Yan (Russia) Olga Iakushova	(Italy) Dorothea Wierer	Russia
2010	(Sweden) Torsby	(Russia) Olga Iakushova	(Russia) Elena Badanina	(Russia) Elena Badanina	Norway
2011	(Czech Republic) Nové Město	(Norway) Thekla Brun-Lie	(Russia) Ekaterina Zubova	(Russia) Ekaterina Zubova	Russia
2012	(Finland) Kontiolahti	(Germany) Julia Bartolomäs	(Norway) Hilde Fenne	(Estonia) Grete Gaim	Ukraine
2013	(Austria) Obertilliach	(Russia) Uliana Kaisheva	(Russia) Uliana Kaisheva	(Russia) Uliana Kaisheva	Russia
2014	(United States) Presque Isle	(Austria) Julia Schwaiger	(Italy) Lisa Vittozzi	(Italy) Lisa Vittozzi	France
2015	(Belarus) Minsk	(Ukraine) Anna Kryvonos	(Belarus) Darya Blashko	(Norway) Ingrid Landmark Tandrevold	Belarus
2016	(Romania) Cheile Gradistei	(Germany) Marina Sauter	(Norway) Karoline Erdal	(Kazakhstan) Arina Pantova	Russia
2017	(Slovakia) Osrblie	(France) Lou Jeanmonnot	(Italy) Irene Lardschneider	(Italy) Irene Lardschneider	Russia
2018	(Estonia) Otepää	(Sweden) Elvira Öberg	(Sweden) Elvira Öberg	(Russia) Anastasia Goreeva	Sweden
2019	(Slovakia) Osrblie	(Greenland) Ukaleq Astri Slettemark	(Norway) Maren Bakken	(Switzerland) Amy Baserga	Norway
2020	(Switzerland) Lenzerheide	(Switzerland) Lea Meier	(Italy) Linda Zingerle	(Austria) Anna Gandler	Norway
2021	(Austria) Obertilliach	(France) Jeanne Richard	(Slovenia) Lena Repinc	(Slovenia) Lena Repinc	France
2022	(United States) Soldier Hollow	(Sweden) Sara Andersson	(Norway) Maren Kirkeeide	(Germany) Selina Grotian	Italy
2023	(Kazakhstan) Shchuchinsk	(Germany) Julia Kink	(Germany) Julia Tannheimer	(Germany) Julia Tannheimer	Germany
Year	Host	Individual	Sprint	Mass start 60	Relay
2024	(Estonia) Otepää	(Germany) Alma Siegismund	(Sweden) Elsa Tänglander	(Ukraine) Oleksandra Merkushyna	Norway
2025	(Sweden) Östersund	(Czech Republic) Ilona Plecháčová	(Norway) Martine Skog	(France) Louise Roguet	Germany
2026	(Germany) Arber	(Slovakia) Michaela Straková	(Slovakia) Michaela Straková	(Austria) Selina Ganner	Norway

=== Mixed relay ===
Year	Host	Winner
2023	(Kazakhstan) Shchuchinsk	Norway; Ragna Fodstad; Maren Brännare-Gran; Kasper Kalkenberg; Sivert Gerhardsen
2024	(Estonia) Otepää	France; Léo Carlier; Antonin Guy; Voldiya Galmace-Paulin; Alice Dusserre
2025	(Sweden) Östersund	Norway; Martine Skog; Bjørg Eide; Tov Røysland; Leo Gundersen
2026	(Germany) Arber	Austria; Simon Hechenberger; Matti Pinter; Ilvy Giestheuer; Selina Ganner

== Medal table ==
As of 2026.

Rank	Nation	Gold	Silver	Bronze	Total
1	Germany	146	112	82	340
2	Russia	132	106	101	339
3	Norway	76	63	79	218
4	France	60	56	49	165
5	Sweden	15	12	13	40
6	Italy	12	23	26	61
7	Austria	12	10	18	40
8	Belarus	10	8	16	34
9	Czech Republic	9	25	26	60
10	Ukraine	9	17	19	45
11	Poland	9	13	12	34
12	Slovenia	6	8	8	22
13	China	6	0	1	7
14	Finland	5	22	27	54
15	United States	5	6	5	16
16	Slovakia	4	9	5	18
17	Canada	4	6	8	18
18	Switzerland	4	5	6	15
19	Kazakhstan	3	5	5	13
20	Latvia	3	3	1	7
21	Netherlands	2	0	0	2
22	Bulgaria	1	9	10	20
23	Estonia	1	4	3	8
24	Romania	1	1	1	3
25	Greenland	1	0	0	1
25	New Zealand	1	0	0	1
27	Croatia	0	3	1	4
28	Denmark	0	1	0	1
Totals (28 entries)		537	527	522	1,586

- Germany including East Germany & West Germany medals
- Russia including USSR medals
- Czech Republic including Czechoslovakia medals

== See also ==
- Biathlon World Championships
- IBU Junior Cup
