= Biathlon World Championships 2016 – Men's individual =

Men's individual at the Biathlon World Championships 2015
- Venue: Oslo, Norway
- Date: 10 March
- Competitors: 99 from 31 nations
- Winning time: 49:13.9

Medalists
gold medal	Martin Fourcade	France
silver medal	Dominik Landertinger	Austria
bronze medal	Simon Eder	Austria

The men's individual event of the Biathlon World Championships 2016 was held on 10 March 2016.

== Results ==
The race was started at 15:30 CET.

Rank	Bib	Name	Nationality	Time	Penalties (P+S+P+S)	Deficit
1st place, gold medalist(s)	23	Martin Fourcade	France	49:13.9	1 (0+1+0+0)	
2nd place, silver medalist(s)	10	Dominik Landertinger	Austria	49:19.0	0 (0+0+0+0)	+5.1
3rd place, bronze medalist(s)	18	Simon Eder	Austria	49:28.3	0 (0+0+0+0)	+14.4
4	27	Johannes Thingnes Bø	Norway	50:11.1	1 (0+0+0+1)	+57.2
5	17	Michal Krčmář	Czech Republic	50:30.3	0 (0+0+0+0)	+1:16.4
6	31	Jakov Fak	Slovenia	50:54.3	1 (0+0+1+0)	+1:40.4
7	77	Erik Lesser	Germany	51:08.6	1 (0+1+0+0)	+1:54.7
8	49	Evgeniy Garanichev	Russia	51:18.5	2 (0+1+1+0)	+2:04.6
9	36	Andreas Birnbacher	Germany	51:25.8	1 (0+0+1+0)	+2:11.9
10	11	Simon Fourcade	France	51:32.3	2 (1+0+0+1)	+2:18.4
11	46	Yan Savitskiy	Kazakhstan	51:45.9	1 (0+0+0+1)	+2:32.0
12	54	Krasimir Anev	Bulgaria	51:47.5	1 (0+1+0+0)	+2:33.6
13	3	Benedikt Doll	Germany	51:47.6	3 (0+1+1+1)	+2:33.7
14	59	Anton Shipulin	Russia	51:51.3	2 (1+0+0+1)	+2:37.4
15	73	Lowell Bailey	United States	51:57.6	1 (0+1+0+0)	+2:43.7
16	39	Simon Schempp	Germany	52:02.3	2 (1+0+1+0)	+2:48.4
17	91	Ole Einar Bjørndalen	Norway	52:14.4	2 (1+0+0+1)	+3:00.5
18	47	Scott Gow	Canada	52:18.8	2 (0+0+0+2)	+3:04.9
19	58	Quentin Fillon Maillet	France	52:20.7	2 (0+1+0+1)	+3:06.8
20	32	Michal Šlesingr	Czech Republic	52:24.9	3 (1+1+0+1)	+3:11.0
21	20	Vladimir Iliev	Bulgaria	52:29.5	3 (0+1+0+2)	+3:15.6
22	1	Tarjei Bø	Norway	52:31.5	3 (1+0+0+2)	+3:17.6
23	95	Jaroslav Soukup	Czech Republic	52:42.6	2 (1+0+0+1)	+3:28.7
24	74	Kauri Kõiv	Estonia	52:46.7	1 (0+0+1+0)	+3:32.8
25	89	Vitaliy Kilchytskyy	Ukraine	52:49.3	0 (0+0+0+0)	+3:35.4
26	90	Michail Kletcherov	Bulgaria	52:53.9	0 (0+0+0+0)	+3:40.0
27	4	Leif Nordgren	United States	52:54.5	2 (0+1+0+1)	+3:40.6
28	60	Simon Desthieux	France	52:57.0	2 (1+0+0+1)	+3:43.1
29	84	Fredrik Lindström	Sweden	53:11.7	2 (0+1+1+0)	+3:57.8
30	75	Jean-Guillaume Béatrix	France	53:16.1	2 (0+1+0+1)	+4:02.2
31	5	Lukas Hofer	Italy	53:16.9	3 (2+1+0+0)	+4:03.0
32	43	Emil Hegle Svendsen	Norway	53:25.3	2 (1+0+0+1)	+4:11.4
33	76	Rok Tršan	Slovenia	53:26.4	1 (0+1+0+0)	+4:12.5
34	94	Sean Doherty	United States	53:27.5	2 (1+0+1+0)	+4:13.6
35	85	Ondřej Moravec	Czech Republic	53:33.4	3 (1+0+2+0)	+4:19.5
36	92	Yuryi Liadov	Belarus	53:37.7	2 (1+1+0+0)	+4:23.8
37	2	Peppe Femling	Sweden	53:38.4	0 (0+0+0+0)	+4:24.5
38	14	Artem Pryma	Ukraine	53:56.1	2 (0+2+0+0)	+4:42.2
39	96	Alexey Volkov	Russia	54:06.3	3 (1+2+0+0)	+4:52.4
40	53	Oleksander Zhyrnyi	Ukraine	54:16.3	3 (0+1+2+0)	+5:02.4
41	71	David Komatz	Austria	54:21.2	3 (0+2+0+1)	+5:07.3
42	69	Nathan Smith	Canada	54:22.2	5 (1+1+1+2)	+5:08.3
43	87	Miha Dovžan	Slovenia	54:25.7	1 (0+1+0+0)	+5:11.8
44	57	Tim Burke	United States	54:28.1	4 (0+1+0+3)	+5:14.2
45	52	Michael Rösch	Belgium	54:37.4	2 (0+1+0+1)	+5:23.5
46	28	Christian Gow	Canada	54:39.0	3 (2+0+0+1)	+5:25.1
47	97	Brendan Green	Canada	54:40.0	3 (0+1+1+1)	+5:26.1
48	8	Anton Pantov	Kazakhstan	54:51.9	1 (0+0+1+0)	+5:38.0
49	56	Benjamin Weger	Switzerland	54:52.7	3 (2+0+0+1)	+5:38.8
50	35	Roland Lessing	Estonia	54:56.8	4 (1+0+1+2)	+5:42.9
51	67	Thomas Bormolini	Italy	55:02.4	3 (0+1+1+1)	+5:48.5
52	16	Karol Dombrovski	Lithuania	55:05.3	0 (0+0+0+0)	+5:51.4
53	72	Serafin Wiestner	Switzerland	55:05.8	4 (1+0+1+2)	+5:51.9
54	48	Jesper Nelin	Sweden	55:14.7	4 (2+2+0+0)	+6:00.8
55	66	Serhiy Semenov	Ukraine	55:27.9	5 (1+2+1+1)	+6:14.0
56	38	Vladimir Chepelin	Belarus	55:35.9	6 (3+0+2+1)	+6:22.0
57	83	George Buta	Romania	55:47.1	1 (0+1+0+0)	+6:33.2
58	40	Julian Eberhard	Austria	55:50.5	6 (0+1+2+3)	+6:36.6
59	37	Andrejs Rastorgujevs	Latvia	55:56.1	6 (1+3+0+2)	+6:42.2
60	55	Dominik Windisch	Italy	55:59.6	6 (2+2+1+1)	+6:45.7
61	62	Raman Yaliotnau	Belarus	56:05.9	5 (1+2+0+2)	+6:52.0
62	63	Sami Orpana	Finland	56:13.8	1 (0+1+0+0)	+6:59.9
63	68	Martin Otčenáš	Slovakia	56:22.1	4 (0+1+0+3)	+7:08.2
64	70	Dmitry Malyshko	Russia	56:22.7	5 (2+1+2+0)	+7:08.8
65	22	Dmitriy Dyuzhev	Belarus	56:37.6	4 (2+0+1+1)	+7:23.7
66	88	Torstein Stenersen	Sweden	56:48.6	4 (1+1+2+0)	+7:34.7
67	61	Vassiliy Podkorytov	Kazakhstan	56:50.9	3 (1+0+1+1)	+7:37.0
68	34	Yuki Nakajima	Japan	56:55.4	3 (2+1+0+0)	+7:41.5
69	13	Lenart Oblak	Slovenia	57:02.0	4 (2+0+1+1)	+7:48.1
70	50	Tomas Kaukėnas	Lithuania	57:04.9	5 (0+3+1+1)	+7:51.0
71	86	Rafał Penar	Poland	57:11.8	2 (1+0+0+1)	+7:57.9
72	24	Mikito Tachizaki	Japan	57:18.3	4 (1+0+3+0)	+8:04.4
73	98	Matej Kazár	Slovakia	57:20.8	5 (1+1+2+1)	+8:06.9
74	25	Mario Dolder	Switzerland	57:30.2	6 (0+2+1+3)	+8:16.3
75	79	Tsukasa Kobonoki	Japan	57:35.1	4 (1+0+2+1)	+8:21.2
76	45	Miroslav Matiaško	Slovakia	57:41.1	4 (1+2+0+1)	+8:27.2
77	81	Dimitar Gerdzhikov	Bulgaria	57:50.0	4 (1+2+1+0)	+8:36.1
78	33	Łukasz Szczurek	Poland	57:54.6	3 (2+0+0+1)	+8:40.7
79	44	Apostolos Angelis	Greece	58:12.1	3 (2+0+0+1)	+8:58.2
80	78	Grzegorz Guzik	Poland	58:18.6	5 (0+4+0+1)	+9:04.7
81	12	Rene Zahkna	Estonia	58:20.1	5 (1+0+3+1)	+9:06.2
82	99	Christian De Lorenzi	Italy	58:24.5	6 (5+0+0+1)	+9:10.6
83	93	Jeremy Finello	Switzerland	58:57.5	7 (1+2+1+3)	+9:43.6
84	64	Thierry Langer	Belgium	59:06.0	4 (1+2+0+1)	+9:52.1
85	41	Olli Hiidensalo	Finland	59:07.4	6 (1+3+0+2)	+9:53.5
86	65	Daumants Lūsa	Latvia	59:11.0	2 (1+0+0+1)	+9:57.1
87	80	Vytautas Strolia	Lithuania	59:21.1	6 (2+2+1+1)	+10:07.2
88	7	Tuomas Grönman	Finland	59:36.5	7 (2+3+0+2)	+10:22.6
89	51	Scott Dixon	Great Britain	59:43.5	3 (0+0+1+2)	+10:29.6
90	6	Lee In-bok	South Korea	1:00:45.3	6 (2+3+1+0)	+11:31.4
91	15	Marius Ungureanu	Romania	1:01:06.0	7 (2+1+2+2)	+11:52.1
92	19	Emir Hrkalović	Serbia	1:01:16.2	4 (0+1+0+3)	+12:02.3
93	29	Kim Jong-min	South Korea	1:01:21.2	4 (0+1+1+2)	+12:07.3
94	30	Cornel Puchianu	Romania	1:01:40.2	10 (3+2+4+1)	+12:26.3
95	26	Roberts Slotiņš	Latvia	1:02:08.0	6 (4+0+1+1)	+12:54.1
96	9	Mehmet Üstüntaş	Turkey	1:02:37.5	2 (0+0+2+0)	+13:23.6
97	21	Károly Gombos	Hungary	1:04:22.9	7 (0+2+2+3)	+15:09.0
98	82	Marcel Laponder	Great Britain	1:04:38.8	8 (2+2+3+1)	+15:24.9
99	42	Edin Hodžić	Serbia	1:07:57.2	7 (3+1+1+2)	+18:43.3
