= Biathlon World Championships 2015 – Men's individual =

Men's individual at the Biathlon World Championships 2015
- Venue: Kontiolahti, Finland
- Date: 12 March 2015
- Competitors: 125 from 34 nations
- Winning time: 47:29.4

Medalists
gold medal	Martin Fourcade	France
silver medal	Emil Hegle Svendsen	Norway
bronze medal	Ondřej Moravec	Czech Republic

The Men's individual event of the Biathlon World Championships 2015 was held on 12 March 2015.

== Results ==
The race was started at 18:15 EET.

Rank	Bib	Name	Nationality	Time	Penalties (P+S+P+S)	Deficit
1st place, gold medalist(s)	34	Martin Fourcade	France	47:29.4	1 (0+1+0+0)	
2nd place, silver medalist(s)	17	Emil Hegle Svendsen	Norway	47:50.3	0 (0+0+0+0)	+20.9
3rd place, bronze medalist(s)	40	Ondřej Moravec	Czech Republic	48:09.9	1 (0+1+0+0)	+40.5
4	3	Simon Fourcade	France	48:15.1	0 (0+0+0+0)	+45.7
5	12	Serhiy Semenov	Ukraine	48:25.4	1 (1+0+0+0)	+56.0
6	69	Ole Einar Bjørndalen	Norway	48:41.5	1 (1+0+0+0)	+1:12.1
7	29	Johannes Thingnes Bø	Norway	48:43.6	1 (0+0+1+0)	+1:14.2
8	24	Simon Schempp	Germany	48:44.3	2 (0+1+1+0)	+1:14.9
9	84	Alexey Volkov	Russia	49:12.3	0 (0+0+0+0)	+1:42.9
10	13	Jakov Fak	Slovenia	49:14.9	2 (0+1+0+1)	+1:45.5
11	42	Daniel Böhm	Germany	49:17.9	2 (1+0+0+1)	+1:48.5
12	76	Christian De Lorenzi	Italy	49:24.7	1 (1+0+0+0)	+1:55.3
13	10	Michael Rösch	Belgium	49:27.3	1 (0+0+0+1)	+1:57.9
14	4	Michal Šlesingr	Czech Republic	49:32.1	3 (1+0+1+1)	+2:02.7
15	45	Roland Lessing	Estonia	49:35.3	1 (1+0+0+0)	+2:05.9
16	19	Anton Shipulin	Russia	49:36.5	2 (1+0+0+1)	+2:07.1
17	31	Yuryi Liadov	Belarus	49:36.9	0 (0+0+0+0)	+2:07.5
18	22	Erik Lesser	Germany	49:45.0	1 (0+0+0+1)	+2:15.6
19	2	Krasimir Anev	Bulgaria	50:07.7	2 (1+1+0+0)	+2:38.3
20	38	Simon Eder	Austria	50:17.1	3 (1+0+1+1)	+2:47.7
21	53	Brendan Green	Canada	50:29.0	1 (1+0+0+0)	+2:59.6
22	104	Arnd Peiffer	Germany	50:35.4	3 (0+1+0+2)	+3:06.0
23	18	Klemen Bauer	Slovenia	50:36.3	3 (1+1+1+0)	+3:06.9
24	65	Lowell Bailey	United States	50:39.4	2 (2+0+0+0)	+3:10.0
25	105	Tarjei Bø	Norway	50:43.0	2 (0+1+0+1)	+3:13.6
26	75	Tomáš Krupčík	Czech Republic	50:43.9	1 (0+1+0+0)	+3:14.5
27	56	Vladimir Iliev	Bulgaria	50:55.6	3 (0+1+0+2)	+3:26.2
28	47	Dominik Landertinger	Austria	51:00.1	2 (0+1+0+1)	+3:30.7
29	126	Sven Grossegger	Austria	51:17.1	2 (0+0+0+2)	+3:47.7
30	36	Benjamin Weger	Switzerland	51:21.4	3 (1+1+0+1)	+3:52.0
31	23	Tim Burke	United States	51:22.1	4 (1+1+0+2)	+3:52.7
32	43	Janez Marič	Slovenia	51:25.3	2 (0+0+0+2)	+3:55.9
33	101	Leif Nordgren	United States	51:25.5	3 (0+1+1+1)	+3:56.1
34	63	Artem Pryma	Ukraine	51:26.7	3 (2+0+0+1)	+3:57.3
35	6	Evgeniy Garanichev	Russia	51:40.2	4 (2+0+0+2)	+4:10.8
36	41	Jaroslav Soukup	Czech Republic	51:45.4	3 (0+1+0+2)	+4:16.0
37	37	Ted Armgren	Sweden	51:47.3	3 (1+1+1+0)	+4:17.9
38	92	Fredrik Lindström	Sweden	51:49.0	3 (0+1+0+2)	+4:19.6
39	50	Lee-Steve Jackson	Great Britain	51:49.5	2 (0+1+0+1)	+4:20.1
40	27	Kalev Ermits	Estonia	51:55.2	3 (1+1+1+0)	+4:25.8
41	67	Vladimir Chepelin	Belarus	51:57.2	3 (0+0+2+1)	+4:27.8
42	54	Matej Kazár	Slovakia	52:09.4	3 (1+0+1+1)	+4:40.0
43	35	Alexei Almoukov	Australia	52:11.3	0 (0+0+0+0)	+4:41.9
44	28	Nathan Smith	Canada	52:32.6	5 (0+1+2+2)	+5:03.2
45	11	Miroslav Matiaško	Slovakia	52:41.7	3 (1+2+0+0)	+5:12.3
46	60	Łukasz Szczurek	Poland	52:42.0	2 (0+2+0+0)	+5:12.6
47	125	Sean Doherty	United States	52:44.9	3 (0+1+2+0)	+5:15.5
48	8	Andrejs Rastorgujevs	Latvia	52:53.1	5 (1+2+1+1)	+5:23.7
49	122	Simon Desthieux	France	52:53.4	2 (0+0+0+2)	+5:24.0
50	7	Lukas Hofer	Italy	52:54.4	5 (2+1+0+2)	+5:25.0
51	9	Ahti Toivanen	Finland	52:55.4	3 (0+1+1+1)	+5:26.0
52	108	Dmytro Rusinov	Ukraine	53:10.9	2 (1+1+0+0)	+5:41.5
53	94	Maxim Braun	Kazakhstan	53:13.0	2 (1+0+0+1)	+5:43.6
54	86	Daniel Mesotitsch	Austria	53:14.0	5 (1+2+0+2)	+5:44.6
55	96	George Buta	Romania	53:19.0	3 (0+2+0+1)	+5:49.6
56	71	Anton Pantov	Kazakhstan	53:19.4	2 (1+1+0+0)	+5:50.0
57	98	Jean-Guillaume Béatrix	France	53:20.9	2 (1+1+0+0)	+5:51.5
58	66	Timofey Lapshin	Russia	53:22.5	4 (2+2+0+0)	+5:53.1
59	85	Kauri Kõiv	Estonia	53:28.5	4 (2+1+1+0)	+5:59.1
60	103	Artem Tyshchenko	Ukraine	53:42.0	3 (1+0+0+2)	+6:12.6
61	83	Serafin Wiestner	Switzerland	53:45.4	5 (1+2+0+2)	+6:16.0
62	55	Peppe Femling	Sweden	53:46.9	5 (2+1+1+1)	+6:17.5
63	79	Scott Gow	Canada	53:49.0	4 (1+1+1+1)	+6:19.6
64	82	Olli Hiidensalo	Finland	53:55.7	4 (1+1+0+2)	+6:26.3
65	124	Christian Gow	Canada	53:57.0	3 (1+1+1+0)	+6:27.6
66	99	Vytautas Strolia	Lithuania	54:00.6	3 (1+2+0+0)	+6:31.2
67	51	Cornel Puchianu	Romania	54:01.9	6 (0+2+2+2)	+6:32.5
68	110	Tobias Arwidson	Sweden	54:05.8	3 (0+1+1+1)	+6:36.4
69	20	Tsukasa Kobonoki	Japan	54:05.9	4 (0+2+2+0)	+6:36.5
70	33	Joel Sloof	Netherlands	54:06.2	2 (0+0+1+1)	+6:36.8
71	14	Krzysztof Pływaczyk	Poland	54:10.0	3 (1+1+0+1)	+6:40.6
72	25	Remus Faur	Romania	54:19.5	3 (1+0+1+1)	+6:50.1
73	32	Tomas Kaukėnas	Lithuania	54:23.6	5 (0+4+1+0)	+6:54.2
74	117	Aliaksandr Darozhka	Belarus	54:24.2	4 (2+1+0+1)	+6:54.8
75	57	Jarkko Kauppinen	Finland	54:33.0	5 (1+2+1+1)	+7:03.6
76	127	Vassiliy Podkorytov	Kazakhstan	54:40.7	2 (0+0+0+2)	+7:11.3
77	74	Grzegorz Guzik	Poland	54:44.5	4 (0+2+0+2)	+7:15.1
78	39	Scott Dixon	Great Britain	54:48.4	2 (1+1+0+0)	+7:19.0
79	70	Quentin Fillon Maillet	France	54:52.6	5 (2+2+0+1)	+7:23.2
80	114	Mikael Koivunen	Finland	54:56.9	1 (0+0+0+1)	+7:27.5
81	21	Ren Long	China	54:58.9	4 (1+1+0+2)	+7:29.5
81	111	Dimitar Gerdzhikov	Bulgaria	54:58.9	4 (2+1+1+0)	+7:29.5
83	107	Thomas Bormolini	Italy	55:04.8	4 (1+0+2+1)	+7:35.4
84	77	Edin Hodzić	Serbia	55:09.1	1 (0+0+1+0)	+7:39.7
85	78	Kazuya Inomata	Japan	55:17.5	5 (2+2+0+1)	+7:48.1
86	16	Yan Savitskiy	Kazakhstan	55:26.0	6 (2+0+2+2)	+7:56.6
87	116	Ivan Joller	Switzerland	55:43.4	3 (0+2+1+0)	+8:14.0
88	87	Martin Otčenáš	Slovakia	55:45.9	4 (1+0+0+3)	+8:16.5
89	88	Toms Praulītis	Latvia	55:58.1	7 (3+2+0+2)	+8:28.7
90	62	Jun Je-uk	South Korea	56:08.3	6 (0+3+1+2)	+8:38.9
91	64	Dominik Windisch	Italy	56:11.3	6 (0+2+1+3)	+8:41.9
92	59	Mario Dolder	Switzerland	56:17.8	6 (0+3+1+2)	+8:48.4
93	72	Karol Dombrovski	Lithuania	56:22.9	6 (0+2+1+3)	+8:53.5
94	30	Károly Gombos	Hungary	56:28.8	1 (0+0+0+1)	+8:59.4
95	1	Kim Yong-gyu	South Korea	56:50.4	4 (0+2+2+0)	+9:21.0
96	106	Ryo Maeda	Japan	57:09.5	4 (0+1+2+1)	+9:40.1
97	100	Dzmitry Abasheu	Belarus	57:14.0	7 (1+2+3+1)	+9:44.6
98	97	Thierry Langer	Belgium	57:24.9	5 (1+2+1+1)	+9:55.5
99	113	Michal Šíma	Slovakia	57:34.1	6 (1+2+0+3)	+10:04.7
100	46	Thorsten Langer	Belgium	57:58.1	2 (0+0+1+1)	+10:28.7
101	93	Lenart Oblak	Slovenia	58:20.3	6 (3+0+3+0)	+10:50.9
102	112	Martin Remmelg	Estonia	58:32.1	6 (0+3+1+2)	+11:02.7
103	44	Roberts Slotiņš	Latvia	58:58.6	7 (0+3+1+3)	+11:29.2
104	90	Marcel Laponder	Great Britain	59:18.3	6 (1+2+1+2)	+11:48.9
105	109	Aleksandrs Patrijuks	Latvia	59:22.4	5 (0+1+1+3)	+11:53.0
106	52	Mikito Tachizaki	Japan	59:30.7	9 (0+3+3+3)	+12:01.3
107	26	Ahmet Üstüntaş	Turkey	59:36.5	4 (1+3+0+0)	+12:07.1
108	49	Damir Rastić	Serbia	1:00:18.3	8 (4+2+0+2)	+12:48.9
109	89	Ivan Zlatev	Bulgaria	1:00:33.8	9 (2+1+4+2)	+13:04.4
110	115	Lee Su-young	South Korea	1:01:19.7	7 (1+0+4+2)	+13:50.3
111	68	Mehmet Üstüntaş	Turkey	1:01:22.6	3 (0+0+2+1)	+13:53.2
112	120	Marian Marcel Dănilă	Romania	1:01:26.2	10 (2+3+2+3)	+13:56.8
113	118	Rokas Suslavičius	Lithuania	1:01:33.3	6 (1+2+2+1)	+14:03.9
114	119	Kevin Kane	Great Britain	1:01:43.1	8 (2+2+2+2)	+14:13.7
115	15	Dejan Krsmanović	Serbia	1:01:44.1	7 (3+2+2+0)	+14:14.7
116	61	Apostolos Angelis	Greece	1:01:57.6	9 (2+3+2+2)	+14:28.2
117	80	Toni Stanoeski	Macedonia	1:01:57.8	7 (2+1+1+3)	+14:28.4
118	91	Dimitrios Kyriazis	Greece	1:02:40.3	5 (0+4+0+1)	+15:10.9
119	95	Kim Jong-min	South Korea	1:02:52.3	10 (1+4+0+5)	+15:22.9
120	123	Ajlan Rastić	Serbia	1:03:27.3	9 (3+2+2+2)	+15:57.9
121	102	Daniel Walker	Australia	1:04:18.2	5 (1+2+1+1)	+16:48.8
122	48	Gjorgji Icoski	Macedonia	1:04:18.3	7 (2+2+2+1)	+16:48.9
123	121	Tom Lahaye-Goffart	Belgium	1:06:28.3	9 (2+2+1+4)	+18:58.9
124	5	Kleanthis Karamichas	Greece	1:07:11.2	11 (3+2+2+4)	+19:41.8
125	73	Dyllan Harmer	Australia	1:07:34.7	10 (3+3+1+3)	+20:05.3
	58	Tang Jinle	China	DNS		
	81	Victor Pînzaru	Moldova	DNS		
