= 2014–15 Biathlon World Cup – Sprint Men =

The 2014–15 Biathlon World Cup – Sprint Men started on Saturday December 6, 2014 in Östersund and finished on Thursday March 19, 2015 in Khanty-Mansiysk. Martin Fourcade of France successfully defended his title.

== Competition format ==
The 10 kilometres (6.2 mi) sprint race is the third oldest biathlon event; the distance is skied over three laps. The biathlete shoots two times at any shooting lane, first prone, then standing, totalling 10 targets. For each missed target the biathlete has to complete a penalty lap of around 150 metres. Competitors' starts are staggered, normally by 30 seconds.

== 2013–14 Top 3 Standings ==
Medal	Athlete	Points
Gold:	(France) Martin Fourcade	400
Silver:	(Germany) Arnd Peiffer	286
Bronze:	(Norway) Johannes Thingnes Bø	277

== Medal winners ==
Event:	Gold:	Time	Silver:	Time	Bronze:	Time
Östersund details	Martin Fourcade; France	24:46.6 (0+0)	Ondřej Moravec; Czech Republic	25:14.9 (0+0)	Jakov Fak; Slovenia	25:15.3 (0+0)
Hochfilzen details	Johannes Thingnes Bø; Norway	24:34.9 (0+0)	Simon Schempp; Germany	24:49.2 (0+0)	Andreas Birnbacher; Germany	24:52.8 (0+0)
Pokljuka details	Anton Shipulin; Russia	23:18.6 (0+0)	Dominik Landertinger; Austria	23:30.5 (0+0)	Emil Hegle Svendsen; Norway	23:42.7 (0+0)
Oberhof details	Martin Fourcade; France	27:02.5 (1+0)	Ole Einar Bjørndalen; Norway	27:06.9 (0+1)	Timofey Lapshin; Russia	27:20.0 (0+1)
Ruhpolding details	Johannes Thingnes Bø; Norway	23:59.2 (0+0)	Simon Schempp; Germany	24:23.7 (0+0)	Arnd Peiffer; Germany	24:57.1 (0+1)
Antholz details	Simon Schempp; Germany	23:18.8 (0+0)	Evgeniy Garanichev; Russia	23:32.8 (0+0)	Jakov Fak; Slovenia	23:38.9 (0+1)
Nové Město details	Jakov Fak; Slovenia	24:09.9 (0+0)	Simon Schempp; Germany	24:22.7 (0+0)	Jean-Guillaume Béatrix; France	24:35.9 (0+0)
Holmenkollen details	Arnd Peiffer; Germany	24:57.0 (0+0)	Martin Fourcade; France	25:00.3 (0+0)	Anton Shipulin; Russia	25:12.4 (0+0)
World Championships details	Johannes Thingnes Bø; Norway	24:12.8 (0+1)	Nathan Smith; Canada	24:24.9 (0+1)	Tarjei Bø; Norway	24:38.1 (0+0)
Khanty-Mansiysk details	Martin Fourcade; France	23:47.0 (0+0)	Anton Shipulin; Russia	24:00.0 (0+0)	Benedikt Doll; Germany	24:05.3 (0+1)

== Standings ==
#	Name	ÖST	HOC	POK	OBE	RUH	ANT	NOV	HOL	WCH	KHA	Total
1	Martin Fourcade (FRA)	60	36	43	60	15	16	43	54	29	60	416
2	Anton Shipulin (RUS)	38	30	60	0	43	36	38	48	23	54	370
3	Simon Schempp (GER)	30	54	38	11	54	60	54	28	0	25	354
4	Jakov Fak (SLO)	48	40	17	25	27	48	60	22	27	23	337
5	Johannes Thingnes Bø (NOR)	1	60	31	43	60	10	31	34	60	0	330
6	Evgeniy Garanichev (RUS)	40	7	40	0	18	54	22	31	38	8	258
7	Ondřej Moravec (CZE)	54	31	23	16	28	31	0	36	32	3	254
8	Michal Šlesingr (CZE)	43	0	21	28	31	—	40	17	36	26	242
9	Arnd Peiffer (GER)	14	8	0	0	48	30	32	60	11	38	241
10	Benjamin Weger (SUI)	0	29	14	40	36	43	12	15	28	22	239
11	Benedikt Doll (GER)	—	—	—	34	38	15	21	30	31	48	217
12	Erik Lesser (GER)	29	12	8	15	16	22	28	27	40	15	212
13	Nathan Smith (CAN)	32	0	16	6	6	0	36	19	54	40	209
14	Ole Einar Bjørndalen (NOR)	34	1	—	54	26	32	6	—	22	32	207
15	Daniel Böhm (GER)	27	26	28	5	32	11	30	11	—	30	200
16	Simon Fourcade (FRA)	17	11	0	22	19	23	18	9	43	34	196
17	Emil Hegle Svendsen (NOR)	36	32	48	—	29	13	0	—	5	28	191
18	Jean-Guillaume Béatrix (FRA)	21	3	27	0	17	24	48	20	2	29	191
19	Andrejs Rastorgujevs (LAT)	28	17	0	38	40	20	–	0	0	43	186
20	Vladimir Iliev (BUL)	0	22	24	27	24	27	5	14	34	7	184
21	Simon Eder (AUT)	31	16	30	29	11	34	15	10	0	0	176
22	Dominik Landertinger (AUT)	11	43	54	—	0	0	29	32	2	—	171
23	Andreas Birnbacher (GER)	19	48	3	21	0	4	23	43	—	—	161
24	Fredrik Lindström (SWE)	5	0	18	4	20	21	26	7	21	36	158
25	Tarjei Bø (NOR)	26	38	36	—	—	0	0	—	48	0	148
26	Quentin Fillon Maillet (FRA)	—	0	34	25	4	12	20	38	3	0	136
27	Dmitry Malyshko (RUS)	20	34	12	18	3	26	–	6	7	1	127
28	Brendan Green (CAN)	—	0	7	—	25	40	19	2	20	11	124
29	Krasimir Anev (BUL)	3	24	9	32	34	0	0	0	0	21	123
30	Timofey Lapshin (RUS)	0	25	0	48	2	25	–	0	14	0	114
31	Maxim Tsvetkov (RUS)	10	18	32	0	—	—	1	23	—	27	111
32	Lowell Bailey (USA)	18	24	25	7	0	9	—	0	24	0	107
33	Alexander Os (NOR)	25	15	0	14	30	17	—	3	—	—	104
34	Serhiy Semenov (UKR)	13	9	0	—	—	0	34	26	15	5	102
35	Mario Dolder (SUI)	—	6	5	0	0	14	13	25	13	24	100
36	Tim Burke (USA)	24	28	15	0	0	0	3	0	26	0	96
37	Jaroslav Soukup (CZE)	0	4	22	10	10	0	17	0	30	DNF	93
38	Yuryi Liadov (BLR)	4	0	0	30	21	—	0	0	25	12	92
39	Dmytro Pidruchnyi (UKR)	0	5	0	—	—	28	27	29	0	—	89
40	Daniel Mesotitsch (AUT)	9	27	10	17	0	0	–	24	0	0	87
41	Erlend Bjøntegaard (NOR)	—	—	19	19	22	—	14	DNS	—	2	76
42	Matej Kazar (SVK)	16	21	0	3	0	7	0	—	8	13	68
43	Henrik L'Abée-Lund (NOR)	—	—	—	—	23	38	0	0	6	0	67
44	Vladimir Chepelin (BLR)	0	0	2	23	13	8	0	4	0	16	66
45	Dominik Windisch (ITA)	0	0	29	8	7	2	–	0	18	0	64
46	Klemen Bauer (SLO)	15	0	0	26	0	DNS	17	0	0	4	62
47	Lukas Hofer (ITA)	7	0	26	—	0	7	–	1	17	0	58
48	Leif Nordgren (USA)	0	0	0	0	0	0	25	12	0	20	57
49	Artem Pryma (UKR)	22	14	0	—	—	19	0	0	0	0	55
50	Julian Eberhard (AUT)	—	—	—	—	0	29	0	0	0	19	48
51	Aleksandr Pechenkin (RUS)	23	19	0	—	—	5	—	—	—	—	47
52	Simon Desthieux (FRA)	0	10	13	0	9	0	7	8	—	—	47
53	Roland Lessing (EST)	—	0	0	36	—	0	–	0	10	—	46
54	Artem Tyshchenko (UKR)	0	0	0	31	12	0	0	0	—	0	43
55	Lars Helge Birkeland (NOR)	—	2	—	—	—	—	–	40	—	0	42
56	Michael Roesch (BEL)	0	0	—	9	5	0	2	0	20	0	36
57	Johannes Kühn (GER)	—	—	4	—	—	—	—	—	—	31	35
58	Serafin Wiestner (SUI)	—	0	0	13	0	0	0	0	12	9	34
59	Michal Krčmář (CZE)	—	0	6	0	0	18	9	0	0	0	33
60	Kalev Ermits (EST)	0	—	—	—	0	0	11	21	0	—	32
61	Cornel Puchianu (ROU)	6	13	0	0	0	0	0	0	9	0	28
62	Matvei Eliseev (RUS)	—	—	—	—	0	0	24	—	—	0	24
63	Sven Grosseger (AUT)	—	—	0	—	–	0	4	13	—	6	23
64	Yan Savitskiy (KAZ)	0	20	0	0	—	0	0	—	0	0	20
64	Thomas Bormolini (ITA)	0	0	—	20	0	0	—	0	0	0	20
64	Martin Otcenas (SVK)	0	0	20	0	0	0	0	—	0	0	20
67	Scott Gow (CAN)	—	—	—	—	14	0	—	5	0	—	19
68	Alexey Slepov (RUS)	—	—	—	—	—	—	0	18	—	0	18
68	Florian Graf (GER)	0	—	—	—	—	—	—	—	—	18	18
70	Alexey Volkov (RUS)	—	—	—	1	0	—	—	—	—	17	18
71	Christian De Lorenzi (ITA)	—	—	—	—	1	0	0	0	16	—	17
72	Antonin Guigonnat (FRA)	—	—	—	—	—	—	0	16	—	—	16
73	Ivan Joller (SUI)	0	—	1	0	—	—	0	0	5	10	16
74	David Komatz (AUT)	12	0	0	—	—	3	–	0	—	0	15
75	Kauri Koiv (EST)	0	0	0	0	0	—	0	0	0	14	14
76	Christofer Eriksson (SWE)	0	0	0	12	0	—	—	—	0	DNS	12
77	Vetle Sjåstad Christiansen (NOR)	—	—	11	0	—	—	—	—	—	—	11
78	Dmitri Dyuzhev (BLR)	—	—	—	—	–	–	10	0	0	0	10
79	Oleksander Zhyrnyi (UKR)	—	—	—	—	9	0	—	—	0	0	9
80	Tomas Krupcik (CZE)	8	0	0	0	—	0	–	0	—	0	8
80	Ted Armgren (SWE)	—	—	0	—	–	–	8	0	0	—	8
82	Tobias Eberhard (AUT)	2	0	—	0	—	—	—	—	—	—	2
82	Miroslav Matiaško (SVK)	—	0	0	2	0	0	0	0	0	0	2
84	Tomáš Hasilla (SVK)	—	—	—	—	0	1	0	0	0	—	1
