= Biathlon World Championships 2012 – Men's individual =

Men's individual at the Biathlon World Championships 2012
- Date: 6 March 2012
- Competitors: 138 from 41 nations
- Winning time: 46:48.2

Medalists
gold medal	Jakov Fak	Slovenia
silver medal	Simon Fourcade	France
bronze medal	Jaroslav Soukup	Czech Republic

The men's individual competition of the Biathlon World Championships 2012 was held on March 6, 2012 at 15:15 local time.

== Results ==
The race was started at 15:15.

Rank	Bib	Name	Country	Penalties (P+S+P+S)	Time	Deficit
1st place, gold medalist(s)	15	Jakov Fak	Slovenia	1 (0+0+0+1)	46:48.2	
2nd place, silver medalist(s)	4	Simon Fourcade	France	1 (0+0+1+0)	46:55.2	+7.0
3rd place, bronze medalist(s)	28	Jaroslav Soukup	Czech Republic	1 (0+1+0+0)	47:00.5	+12.3
4	20	Andreas Birnbacher	Germany	1 (0+0+0+1)	47:01.3	+13.1
5	9	Klemen Bauer	Slovenia	1 (0+0+0+1)	47:04.8	+16.6
6	13	Michal Šlesingr	Czech Republic	1 (0+0+1+0)	47:13.3	+25.1
7	12	Arnd Peiffer	Germany	2 (0+0+0+2)	47:24.7	+36.5
8	26	Emil Hegle Svendsen	Norway	2 (1+1+0+0)	47:37.4	+49.2
9	47	Sergey Novikov	Belarus	0 (0+0+0+0)	47:38.0	+49.8
10	29	Fredrik Lindström	Sweden	1 (0+1+0+0)	47:40.2	+52.0
11	36	Michael Greis	Germany	1 (0+0+0+1)	47:46.4	+58.2
12	2	Ondřej Moravec	Czech Republic	2 (1+1+0+0)	47:47.9	+59.7
13	18	Daniel Mesotitsch	Austria	2 (1+0+1+0)	48:05.3	+1:17.1
14	32	Timofey Lapshin	Russia	1 (1+0+0+0)	48:25.3	+1:37.1
15	37	Dominik Landertinger	Austria	2 (0+2+0+0)	48:30.5	+1:42.3
16	60	Vladimir Iliev	Bulgaria	1 (0+0+0+1)	48:31.6	+1:43.4
17	56	Andriy Deryzemlya	Ukraine	2 (0+1+0+1)	48:36.1	+1:47.9
18	16	Tarjei Bø	Norway	4 (2+0+1+1)	48:58.6	+2:10.4
19	1	Krasimir Anev	Bulgaria	1 (0+0+1+0)	49:02.0	+2:13.8
20	11	Lukas Hofer	Italy	3 (1+1+0+1)	49:10.5	+2:22.3
21	35	Alexey Volkov	Russia	2 (1+0+0+1)	49:15.0	+2:26.8
22	25	Markus Windisch	Italy	2 (1+0+0+1)	49:17.2	+2:29.0
23	38	Simon Eder	Austria	2 (1+0+1+0)	49:20.5	+2:32.3
24	40	Artem Pryma	Ukraine	2 (0+0+1+1)	49:25.4	+2:37.2
25	6	Martin Fourcade	France	5 (0+2+1+2)	49:26.7	+2:38.5
26	99	Kauri Koiv	Estonia	1 (1+0+0+0)	49:37.6	+2:49.4
27	10	Michail Kletcherov	Bulgaria	1 (0+1+0+0)	49:40.9	+2:52.7
28	51	Yan Savitskiy	Kazakhstan	1 (0+1+0+0)	49:52.8	+3:04.6
29	31	Vincent Jay	France	3 (1+0+1+1)	49:56.5	+3:08.3
30	92	Hidenori Isa	Japan	0 (0+0+0+0)	49:57.3	+3:09.1
31	33	Jay Hakkinen	United States	2 (1+0+0+1)	50:06.0	+3:17.8
32	64	Christian De Lorenzi	Italy	3 (1+1+1+0)	50:16.5	+3:28.3
33	58	Tomáš Holubec	Czech Republic	2 (0+0+2+0)	50:18.6	+3:30.4
34	43	Janez Marič	Slovenia	3 (0+1+0+2)	50:21.3	+3:33.1
35	21	Dmitry Malyshko	Russia	4 (0+2+2+0)	50:23.4	+3:35.2
36	5	Simon Hallenbarter	Switzerland	3 (0+1+0+2)	50:24.2	+3:36.0
37	134	Tomasz Sikora	Poland	1 (1+0+0+0)	50:26.6	+3:38.4
38	23	Lowell Bailey	United States	4 (0+2+1+1)	50:27.8	+3:39.6
39	50	Lars Helge Birkeland	Norway	2 (0+0+1+1)	50:29.5	+3:41.3
40	45	Matej Kazar	Slovakia	3 (2+1+0+0)	50:30.1	+3:41.9
41	3	Benjamin Weger	Switzerland	4 (2+1+1+0)	50:31.0	+3:42.8
42	42	Jarkko Kauppinen	Finland	2 (0+0+1+1)	50:41.9	+3:53.7
43	7	Christoph Sumann	Austria	3 (0+1+2+0)	50:47.4	+3:59.2
44	84	Aliaksandr Babchyn	Belarus	2 (0+1+1+0)	50:47.9	+3:59.7
45	62	Scott Perras	Canada	3 (0+1+0+2)	50:49.3	+4:01.1
46	30	Rune Brattsveen	Norway	4 (1+1+1+1)	50:51.9	+4:03.7
47	27	Ole Einar Bjørndalen	Norway	5 (1+1+2+1)	50:56.2	+4:08.0
48	22	Björn Ferry	Sweden	4 (1+1+1+1)	50:56.9	+4:08.7
49	49	Evgeny Abramenko	Belarus	3 (1+0+1+1)	50:57.3	+4:09.1
50	14	Evgeny Ustyugov	Russia	5 (0+1+1+3)	51:01.0	+4:12.8
51	44	Indrek Tobreluts	Estonia	3 (0+0+0+3)	51:03.3	+4:15.1
52	34	Alexis Bœuf	France	4 (0+2+1+1)	51:05.4	+4:17.2
53	8	Ted Armgren	Sweden	3 (1+1+0+1)	51:19.5	+4:31.3
54	70	Krzysztof Plywaczyk	Poland	2 (2+0+0+0)	51:25.6	+4:37.4
55	52	Ivan Joller	Switzerland	3 (1+1+0+1)	51:25.7	+4:37.5
56	24	Tim Burke	United States	5 (0+2+1+2)	51:26.3	+4:38.1
57	78	Priit Viks	Estonia	2 (0+0+1+1)	51:41.3	+4:53.1
58	61	Olexander Bilanenko	Ukraine	3 (1+1+0+1)	51:44.0	+4:55.8
59	54	Alexandr Chervyakov	Kazakhstan	3 (0+1+0+2)	52:08.4	+5:20.2
60	19	Serhiy Semenov	Ukraine	5 (2+1+1+1)	52:16.1	+5:27.9
61	100	Nathan Smith	Canada	4 (2+2+0+0)	52:17.6	+5:29.4
62	59	Junji Nagai	Japan	3 (1+1+0+1)	52:23.8	+5:35.6
63	109	Vladimir Alenishko	Belarus	3 (1+1+0+1)	52:24.1	+5:35.9
64	55	Mario Dolder	Switzerland	4 (1+2+1+0)	52:26.5	+5:38.3
65	87	Edgars Piksons	Latvia	1 (0+0+0+1)	52:28.3	+5:40.1
66	72	Martin Otcenas	Slovakia	3 (2+1+0+0)	52:45.5	+5:57.3
67	57	Roland Lessing	Estonia	4 (2+0+0+2)	52:47.0	+5:58.8
68	46	Andrejs Rastorgujevs	Latvia	5 (2+0+1+2)	52:57.5	+6:09.3
69	89	Marc-André Bédard	Canada	4 (0+1+1+2)	53:01.8	+6:13.6
70	53	Dušan Šimočko	Slovakia	5 (1+0+2+2)	53:03.0	+6:14.8
71	17	Jean-Philippe Leguellec	Canada	6 (1+2+2+1)	53:08.6	+6:20.4
72	63	Rene Laurent Vuillermoz	Italy	4 (1+1+1+1)	53:10.8	+6:22.6
73	136	Adam Kwak	Poland	2 (1+0+1+0)	53:26.9	+6:38.7
74	69	Tomas Kaukėnas	Lithuania	4 (0+0+2+2)	53:27.4	+6:39.2
75	74	Anton Pantov	Kazakhstan	2 (1+1+0+0)	53:28.3	+6:40.1
76	94	Lee In-bok	South Korea	1 (0+1+0+0)	53:34.1	+6:45.9
77	95	Rolands Pužulis	Latvia	2 (2+0+0+0)	53:37.0	+6:48.8
78	83	Pavol Hurajt	Slovakia	5 (1+2+0+2)	53:38.8	+6:50.6
79	82	Łukasz Szczurek	Poland	3 (2+1+0+0)	53:39.5	+6:51.3
80	65	Timo Antila	Finland	6 (2+2+0+2)	53:56.2	+7:08.0
81	41	Leif Nordgren	United States	6 (0+1+2+3)	54:07.1	+7:18.9
82	105	Alexei Almoukov	Australia	2 (0+0+1+1)	54:09.4	+7:21.2
83	110	Stefan Gavrila	Romania	4 (0+3+0+1)	54:13.3	+7:25.1
84	108	Peter Dokl	Slovenia	4 (1+1+1+1)	54:17.3	+7:29.1
84	135	Li Zhonghai	China	2 (0+0+1+1)	54:17.3	+7:29.1
86	107	Ville Simola	Finland	1 (0+1+0+0)	54:20.2	+7:32.0
87	48	Magnus Jonsson	Sweden	6 (3+2+0+1)	54:47.4	+7:59.2
88	117	Marcel Laponder	Great Britain	1 (0+1+0+0)	54:49.2	+8:01.0
89	88	Ahti Toivanen	Finland	6 (1+2+1+2)	54:54.8	+8:06.6
90	30	Simon Schempp	Germany	7 (3+1+1+2)	54:55.3	+8:07.1
91	104	Pedro Quintana Arias	Spain	2 (0+1+0+1)	55:04.8	+8:16.6
92	93	Ahmet Üstüntaş	Turkey	1 (0+0+1+0)	55:06.8	+8:18.6
93	130	Karol Dombrovski	Lithuania	3 (0+1+1+1)	55:22.1	+8:33.9
94	86	Chen Haibin	China	3 (0+1+1+1)	55:25.1	+8:36.9
95	97	Damir Rastić	Serbia	4 (1+2+0+0)	55:26.3	+8:38.1
96	125	Ren Long	China	3 (1+2+1+0)	55:38.2	+8:50.0
97	123	Arturs Kolesnikovs	Latvia	3 (0+1+0+2)	55:50.6	+9:02.4
98	66	Zhang Chengye	China	4 (0+1+1+1)	56:10.7	+9:22.5
99	121	Samuel Pulido Serrano	Spain	3 (2+0+1+1)	56:12.4	+9:24.2
100	85	Sergey Naumik	Kazakhstan	6 (2+1+1+2)	56:19.7	+9:31.5
101	106	Kazuya Inomata	Japan	6 (2+1+2+1)	56:46.8	+9:58.6
102	127	Herbert Cool	Netherlands	4 (1+0+2+1)	56:52.1	+10:03.9
103	68	Pete Beyer	Great Britain	2 (0+0+1+1)	57:19.5	+10:31.3
104	113	Karolis Zlatkauskas	Lithuania	5 (0+4+0+1)	57:20.2	+10:32.0
105	112	Thorsten Langer	Belgium	3 (0+0+1+2)	57:27.0	+10:38.8
106	103	Manuel Fernandez Musso	Spain	5 (0+3+0+2)	57:47.8	+10:59.6
107	114	Ryo Tsunoda	Japan	7 (2+2+1+2)	58:00.4	+11:12.2
108	77	Darko Damjanovski	Macedonia	5 (0+4+0+1)	58:00.9	+11:12.7
109	73	Lee-Steve Jackson	Great Britain	8 (2+2+3+1)	58:11.5	+11:23.3
110	102	Milan Szabó	Hungary	5 (0+0+2+3)	58:24.8	+11:36.6
111	79	Karoly Gombos	Hungary	6 (1+3+1+1)	58:51.0	+12:02.8
112	71	Milanko Petrović	Serbia	11 (5+0+4+2)	59:40.9	+12:52.7
113	115	Orhangazi Civil	Turkey	4 (0+1+0+3)	59:51.8	+13:03.6
114	131	Aleksandr Lavrinovič	Lithuania	4 (2+1+0+1)	59:52.0	+13:03.8
115	119	Nemanja Košarac	Bosnia and Herzegovina	6 (2+1+1+2)	1:00:12.1	+13:23.9
116	96	Jun Je-uk	South Korea	8 (4+2+2+0)	1:00:13.3	+13:25.1
117	111	Martin Bogdanov	Bulgaria	8 (3+3+1+1)	1:00:20.7	+13:32.5
118	139	Edin Hodžić	Serbia	5 (0+3+1+1)	1:00:53.4	+14:05.2
119	132	Thierry Langer	Belgium	5 (1+1+2+1)	1:00:54.6	+14:06.4
120	120	Kim Yong-gyu	South Korea	7 (1+2+3+1)	1:01:02.6	+14:14.4
121	133	Athanassios Tsakiris	Greece	3 (2+0+1+0)	1:01:22.4	+14:34.2
122	116	Øystein Slettemark	Greenland	7 (1+4+2+0)	1:01:23.0	+14:34.8
123	124	Vincent Naveau	Belgium	5 (2+2+1+0)	1:01:29.5	+14:41.3
124	76	Gjorgji Icoski	Macedonia	4 (0+2+0+2)	1:01:37.3	+14:49.1
125	67	Kleanthis Karamichas	Greece	2 (0+2+0+0)	1:01:59.7	+15:11.5
126	126	Jurica Veverec	Croatia	5 (1+0+3+1)	1:02:48.0	+15:59.8
127	80	Tomislav Crnković	Croatia	4 (0+1+2+1)	1:03:07.8	+16:19.6
128	138	Emir Hrkalović	Serbia	7 (1+2+2+2)	1:03:34.7	+16:46.5
129	90	Victor Pinzaru	Moldova	7 (0+2+2+3)	1:04:13.4	+17:25.2
130	98	Stefan Lopatić	Bosnia and Herzegovina	10 (4+2+0+4)	1:04:31.4	+17:43.2
131	137	Dyllan Harmer	Australia	4 (1+1+0+2)	1:04:36.0	+17:47.8
132	101	Anuzar Yunusov	Uzbekistan	11 (4+2+2+3)	1:07:13.1	+20:24.9
133	81	Aqqaluartaa Olsen	Greenland	11 (2+2+3+4)	1:07:50.1	+21:01.9
134	91	Dino Butković	Croatia	9 (2+2+2+3)	1:08:04.9	+21:16.7
135	129	István Muskatal	Hungary	13 (3+5+2+3)	1:09:14.9	+22:26.7
	75	Pascal Langer	Belgium	(3+3)	DNF	
	122	Laurentiu Vamanu	Romania	(1+2+4)	DNF	
	128	Kim Jong-min	South Korea	(1+0)	DNF	
	118	Ben Woolley	Great Britain		DNS	
