= Biathlon World Championships 2020 – Men's sprint =

Men's sprint at the Biathlon World Championships 2020
- Venue: South Tyrol Arena
- Location: Antholz-Anterselva, Italy
- Dates: 15 February
- Competitors: 107 from 36 nations
- Winning time: 22:48.1

Medalists
gold medal	Alexandr Loginov	Russia
silver medal	Quentin Fillon Maillet	France
bronze medal	Martin Fourcade	France

The Men's sprint competition at the Biathlon World Championships 2020 was held on 15 February 2020 at 14:45 local time.

== Results ==
Rank	Bib	Name	Nationality	Penalties (P+S)	Time	Deficit
1st place, gold medalist(s)	43	Alexandr Loginov	Russia	0 (0+0)	22:48.1	—
2nd place, silver medalist(s)	8	Quentin Fillon Maillet	France	1 (1+0)	22:54.6	+6.5
3rd place, bronze medalist(s)	18	Martin Fourcade	France	0 (0+0)	23:07.6	+19.5
4	23	Tarjei Bø	Norway	0 (0+0)	23:10.6	+22.5
5	3	Johannes Thingnes Bø	Norway	1 (1+0)	23:12.0	+23.9
6	59	Émilien Jacquelin	France	1 (0+1)	23:17.9	+29.8
7	22	Arnd Peiffer	Germany	0 (0+0)	23:27.8	+39.7
8	41	Philipp Horn	Germany	2 (1+1)	23:32.5	+44.4
9	78	Felix Leitner	Austria	0 (0+0)	23:40.2	+52.1
10	25	Dmytro Pidruchnyi	Ukraine	1 (0+1)	23:44.5	+56.4
11	16	Sebastian Samuelsson	Sweden	1 (1+0)	23:51.9	+1:03.8
12	67	Matvey Eliseev	Russia	1 (1+0)	23:57.2	+1:09.1
13	47	Martin Otčenáš	Slovakia	0 (0+0)	23:59.3	+1:11.2
14	20	Benedikt Doll	Germany	3 (2+1)	23:59.7	+1:11.6
15	89	Anton Smolski	Belarus	0 (0+0)	24:01.1	+1:13.0
16	17	Scott Gow	Canada	1 (1+0)	24:04.4	+1:16.3
17	81	Timofey Lapshin	South Korea	2 (1+1)	24:06.5	+1:18.4
18	5	Simon Desthieux	France	2 (0+2)	24:07.5	+1:19.4
19	88	Jesper Nelin	Sweden	1 (0+1)	24:08.0	+1:19.9
20	91	Peppe Femling	Sweden	1 (1+0)	24:08.9	+1:20.8
21	1	Lukas Hofer	Italy	2 (1+1)	24:10.4	+1:22.3
21	4	Nikita Porshnev	Russia	0 (0+0)	24:10.4	+1:22.3
23	7	Johannes Dale	Norway	2 (1+1)	24:12.2	+1:24.1
24	92	Grzegorz Guzik	Poland	0 (0+0)	24:13.9	+1:25.8
25	29	Artem Pryma	Ukraine	1 (1+0)	24:14.5	+1:26.4
26	32	Julian Eberhard	Austria	3 (1+2)	24:16.0	+1:27.9
27	28	Martin Ponsiluoma	Sweden	2 (2+0)	24:16.2	+1:28.1
28	52	Vytautas Strolia	Lithuania	1 (1+0)	24:23.9	+1:35.8
29	74	Rok Tršan	Slovenia	1 (0+1)	24:24.8	+1:36.7
30	19	Krasimir Anev	Bulgaria	2 (0+2)	24:25.8	+1:37.7
31	98	Dominik Landertinger	Austria	2 (0+2)	24:31.5	+1:43.4
32	64	Raman Yaliotnau	Belarus	1 (1+0)	24:31.6	+1:43.5
33	40	Vetle Sjåstad Christiansen	Norway	3 (3+0)	24:31.7	+1:43.6
34	12	Florent Claude	Belgium	1 (0+1)	24:32.5	+1:44.4
35	44	Erlend Bjøntegaard	Norway	3 (0+3)	24:38.2	+1:50.1
36	21	Mikita Labastau	Belarus	0 (0+0)	24:39.8	+1:51.7
37	14	Simon Eder	Austria	2 (1+1)	24:43.5	+1:55.4
38	10	Mario Dolder	Switzerland	2 (0+2)	24:43.9	+1:55.8
39	2	Michal Krčmář	Czech Republic	2 (2+0)	24:46.1	+1:58.0
40	15	Johannes Kühn	Germany	4 (1+3)	24:47.4	+1:59.3
40	68	Thomas Bormolini	Italy	1 (0+1)	24:47.4	+1:59.3
42	9	Sergii Semenov	Ukraine	2 (1+1)	24:48.5	+2:00.4
43	69	Šimon Bartko	Slovakia	2 (1+1)	24:49.4	+2:01.3
44	46	Sean Doherty	United States	2 (1+1)	24:51.6	+2:03.5
45	100	Jakov Fak	Slovenia	1 (0+1)	24:51.8	+2:03.7
46	27	Ondřej Moravec	Czech Republic	2 (1+1)	24:52.6	+2:04.5
47	73	Jakub Štvrtecký	Czech Republic	3 (1+2)	24:55.5	+2:07.4
48	45	Dominik Windisch	Italy	3 (1+2)	24:59.0	+2:10.9
49	77	Kosuke Ozaki	Japan	1 (1+0)	25:01.2	+2:13.1
50	13	Karol Dombrovski	Lithuania	1 (0+1)	25:01.8	+2:13.7
51	48	Benjamin Weger	Switzerland	2 (1+1)	25:02.1	+2:14.0
52	6	Tero Seppälä	Finland	3 (0+3)	25:02.5	+2:14.4
53	80	George Buta	Romania	1 (1+0)	25:06.0	+2:17.9
54	66	Serafin Wiestner	Switzerland	4 (0+4)	25:08.7	+2:20.6
55	38	Olli Hiidensalo	Finland	2 (0+2)	25:10.2	+2:22.1
56	58	Evgeniy Garanichev	Russia	3 (1+2)	25:14.5	+2:26.4
57	101	Dimitar Gerdzhikov	Bulgaria	2 (2+0)	25:18.8	+2:30.7
58	49	Vladimir Iliev	Bulgaria	4 (2+2)	25:19.1	+2:31.0
59	55	Rene Zahkna	Estonia	2 (2+0)	25:24.4	+2:36.3
60	82	Anton Dudchenko	Ukraine	1 (0+1)	25:27.6	+2:39.5
61	42	Łukasz Szczurek	Poland	3 (2+1)	25:27.9	+2:39.8
62	72	Tomas Kaukėnas	Lithuania	2 (1+1)	25:30.1	+2:42.0
63	61	Miha Dovžan	Slovenia	2 (1+1)	25:33.0	+2:44.9
64	103	Adam Václavík	Czech Republic	3 (1+2)	25:33.5	+2:45.4
65	60	Christian Gow	Canada	3 (2+1)	25:34.2	+2:46.1
66	24	Cheng Fangming	China	4 (0+4)	25:34.3	+2:46.2
67	104	Bogdan Tsymbal	Ukraine	1 (0+1)	25:37.2	+2:49.1
68	85	Jake Brown	United States	4 (2+2)	25:39.1	+2:51.0
69	87	Jules Burnotte	Canada	4 (1+3)	25:44.9	+2:56.8
70	39	Andrejs Rastorgujevs	Latvia	6 (3+3)	25:45.8	+2:57.7
71	95	Joscha Burkhalter	Switzerland	2 (2+0)	25:47.0	+2:58.9
72	96	Paul Schommer	United States	2 (1+1)	25:52.4	+3:04.3
73	90	Daniele Cappellari	Italy	1 (0+1)	25:54.4	+3:06.3
74	53	Cornel Puchianu	Romania	4 (1+3)	25:58.1	+3:10.0
75	34	Thierry Langer	Belgium	3 (1+2)	26:00.8	+3:12.7
76	56	Yan Xingyuan	China	2 (2+0)	26:02.3	+3:14.2
77	97	George Coltea	Romania	2 (2+0)	26:05.0	+3:16.9
78	37	Damir Rastić	Serbia	4 (2+2)	26:08.5	+3:20.4
79	84	Anton Sinapov	Bulgaria	5 (3+2)	26:10.5	+3:22.4
80	76	Kalev Ermits	Estonia	3 (2+1)	26:11.6	+3:23.5
81	105	Adam Dunnalls	Canada	4 (2+2)	26:16.9	+3:28.8
82	36	Mikito Tachizaki	Japan	4 (1+3)	26:20.5	+3:32.4
83	71	Krešimir Crnković	Croatia	4 (1+3)	26:25.6	+3:37.5
84	106	Roberts Slotiņš	Latvia	2 (0+2)	26:29.1	+3:41.0
85	70	Vladislav Kireyev	Kazakhstan	4 (2+2)	26:32.6	+3:44.5
86	54	Sergey Bocharnikov	Belarus	4 (3+1)	26:36.1	+3:48.0
87	102	Klemen Bauer	Slovenia	5 (4+1)	26:37.3	+3:49.2
88	11	Leif Nordgren	United States	4 (2+2)	26:41.2	+3:53.1
89	83	Aleksandrs Patrijuks	Latvia	5 (2+3)	26:42.7	+3:54.6
90	63	Andrzej Nędza-Kubiniec	Poland	4 (2+2)	26:47.9	+3:59.8
91	50	Alexandr Mukhin	Kazakhstan	5 (3+2)	26:49.2	+4:01.1
92	79	Tom Lahaye-Goffart	Belgium	3 (0+3)	26:58.3	+4:10.2
93	75	Jaakko Ranta	Finland	4 (3+1)	26:59.1	+4:11.0
94	99	Tomáš Hasilla	Slovakia	5 (2+3)	27:01.7	+4:13.6
95	93	Raido Ränkel	Estonia	6 (2+4)	27:22.9	+4:34.8
96	51	Stavre Jada	North Macedonia	2 (1+1)	27:30.9	+4:42.8
97	26	Roberto Piqueras	Spain	4 (1+3)	27:41.4	+4:53.3
98	33	Zana Öztunç	Turkey	3 (1+2)	27:49.4	+5:01.3
99	107	Kazuki Baisho	Japan	6 (2+4)	27:51.5	+5:03.4
100	57	Apostolos Angelis	Greece	6 (3+3)	28:01.2	+5:13.1
101	86	Mehmet Ustuntaş	Turkey	0 (0+0)	28:19.2	+5:31.1
102	65	Soma Gyallai	Hungary	4 (1+3)	28:31.3	+5:43.2
103	35	Miloš Čolić	Bosnia and Herzegovina	3 (1+2)	28:31.4	+5:43.3
104	62	Dávid Panyik	Hungary	3 (0+3)	28:32.6	+5:44.5
105	31	Lee Su-young	South Korea	6 (3+3)	28:48.6	+6:00.5
106	94	Sergey Sirik	Kazakhstan	7 (3+4)	28:52.2	+6:04.1
107	30	Vinny Fountain	Great Britain	6 (3+3)	29:28.9	+6:40.8
