= Biathlon World Championships 2015 – Men's mass start =

Men's mass start at the Biathlon World Championships 2015
- Venue: Kontiolahti, Finland
- Date: 15 March 2015
- Competitors: 30 from 17 nations
- Winning time: 36:24.9

Medalists
gold medal	Jakov Fak	Slovenia
silver medal	Ondřej Moravec	Czech Republic
bronze medal	Tarjei Bø	Norway

The Men's mass start event of the Biathlon World Championships 2015 was held on 15 March 2015. 30 athletes participated over a course of 15 km.

== Results ==
The race was started at 17:15 EET.

Rank	Bib	Name	Nationality	Time	Penalties (P+P+S+S)	Deficit
1st place, gold medalist(s)	9	Jakov Fak	Slovenia	36:24.9	1 (0+0+1+0)	
2nd place, silver medalist(s)	8	Ondřej Moravec	Czech Republic	36:25.9	1 (1+0+0+0)	+1.0
3rd place, bronze medalist(s)	7	Tarjei Bø	Norway	36:28.6	1 (0+0+1+0)	+3.7
4	15	Ole Einar Bjørndalen	Norway	36:35.1	0 (0+0+0+0)	+10.2
5	12	Michal Šlesingr	Czech Republic	36:43.3	3 (1+0+2+0)	+18.4
6	1	Johannes Thingnes Bø	Norway	36:43.6	2 (0+0+2+0)	+18.7
7	5	Anton Shipulin	Russia	36:47.7	3 (0+1+2+0)	+22.8
8	10	Simon Schempp	Germany	36:50.5	2 (0+1+1+0)	+25.6
9	14	Simon Fourcade	France	36:52.8	1 (0+0+0+1)	+27.9
10	3	Martin Fourcade	France	36:55.8	4 (0+1+2+1)	+30.9
11	11	Evgeniy Garanichev	Russia	36:56.6	2 (0+0+1+1)	+31.7
12	16	Fredrik Lindström	Sweden	36:59.6	1 (0+0+1+0)	+34.7
13	28	Lowell Bailey	United States	36:59.9	1 (1+0+0+0)	+35.0
14	26	Tim Burke	United States	37:10.5	3 (1+0+1+1)	+45.6
15	6	Emil Hegle Svendsen	Norway	37:10.5	2 (0+0+1+1)	+45.6
16	29	Benedikt Doll	Germany	37:10.6	2 (0+0+1+1)	+45.7
17	2	Erik Lesser	Germany	37:15.5	2 (0+0+2+0)	+50.6
18	22	Christian De Lorenzi	Italy	37:16.5	2 (0+0+1+1)	+51.6
19	13	Simon Eder	Austria	37:27.8	3 (1+0+0+2)	+1:02.9
20	20	Yuryi Liadov	Belarus	37:29.7	1 (0+0+0+1)	+1:04.8
21	23	Brendan Green	Canada	37:33.2	1 (0+0+0+1)	+1:08.3
22	25	Arnd Peiffer	Germany	37:39.9	4 (0+2+2+0)	+1:15.0
23	4	Nathan Smith	Canada	37:44.3	3 (2+0+1+0)	+1:19.4
24	30	Dominik Landertinger	Austria	37:53.4	3 (0+1+1+1)	+1:28.5
25	18	Vladimir Iliev	Bulgaria	37:59.0	3 (1+0+1+1)	+1:34.1
26	21	Michael Rösch	Belgium	38:09.6	3 (0+1+1+1)	+1:44.7
27	19	Serhiy Semenov	Ukraine	38:10.8	5 (2+0+2+1)	+1:45.9
28	24	Jaroslav Soukup	Czech Republic	38:21.9	3 (1+0+2+0)	+1:57.0
29	17	Benjamin Weger	Switzerland	38:40.0	3 (0+1+1+1)	+2:15.1
30	27	Roland Lessing	Estonia	39:26.9	3 (1+0+0+2)	+3:02.0
