= Milán Szabó =

Hungarian cross-country skier and biathlete (born 1990)

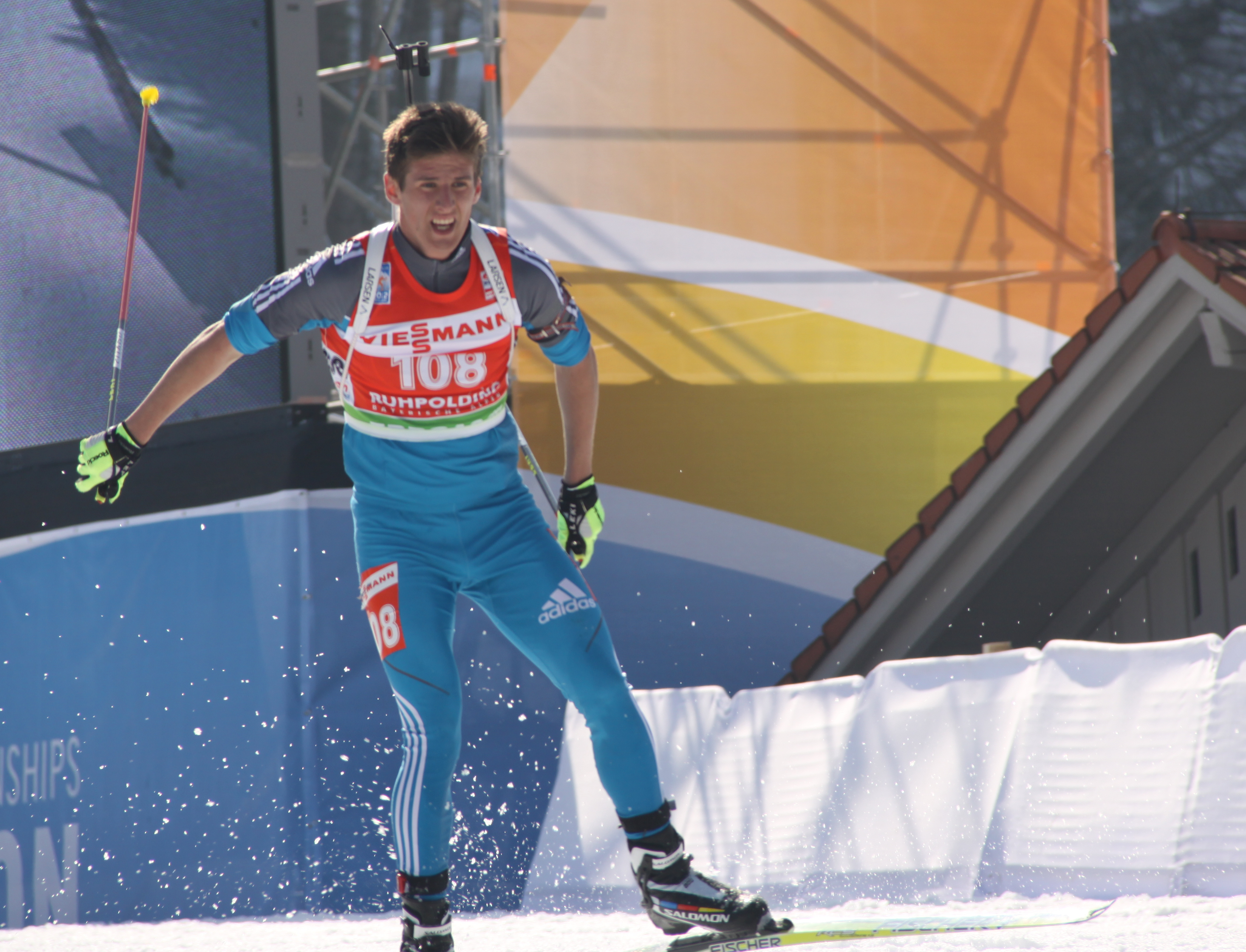
Milán Szabó

Milán Szabó (Hungarian pronunciation: [ˈmilaːn ˈsɒboː]; born 28 December 1990 in Vác) is a Hungarian cross-country skier and biathlete. He debuted in 2013 and competed for Hungary at the 2014 Winter Olympics in cross-country skiing.
