= Lenart Oblak =

Slovenian biathlete (born 1991)

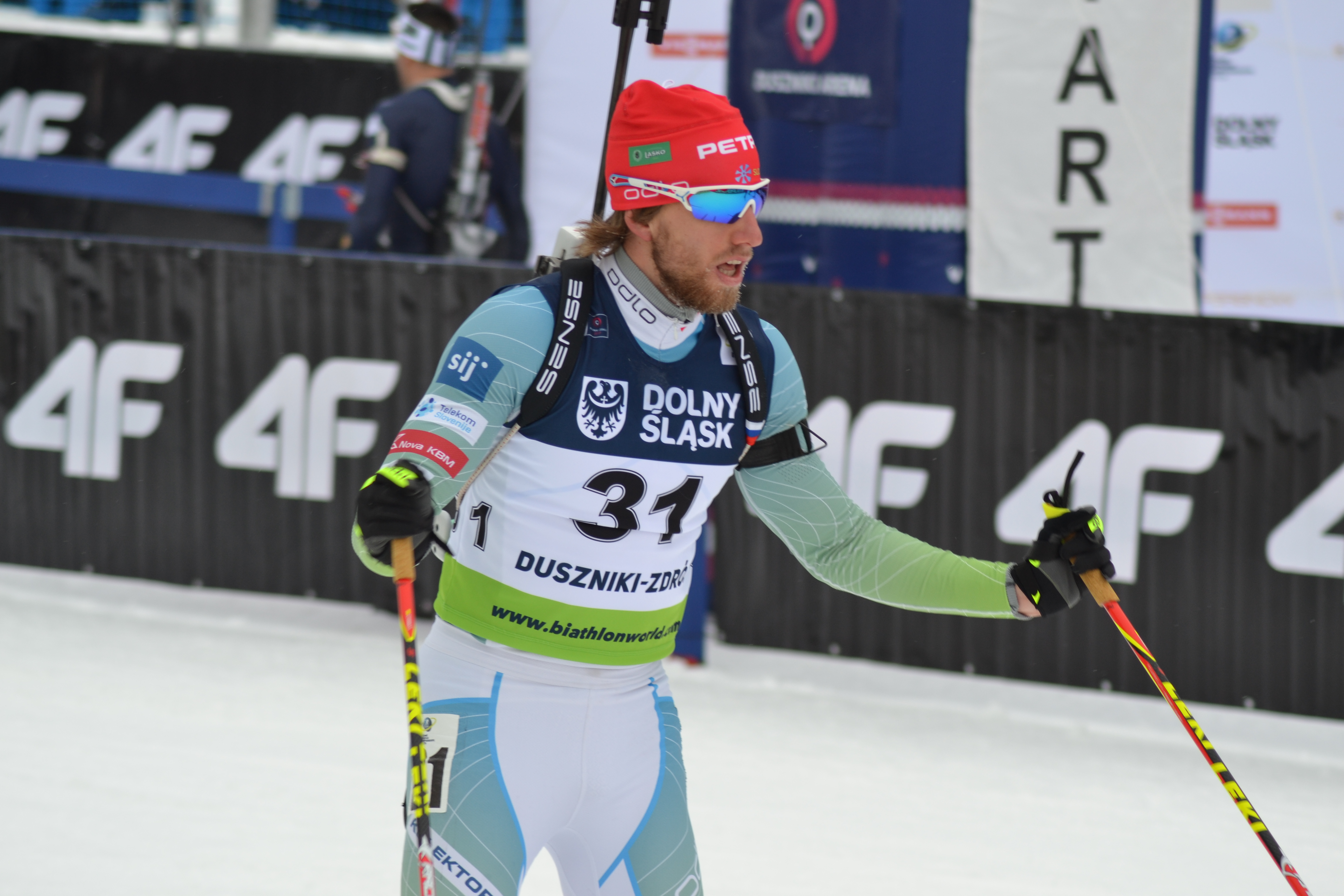
- Lenart Oblak in 2017

Personal information
- Nationality: Slovenian
- Born: 27 June 1991 (age 33); Kranj, Slovenia

Sport
- Sport: Biathlon

Lenart Oblak (born 27 June 1991) is a Slovenian biathlete. He competed in the 2018 Winter Olympics.

== Biathlon results ==
All results are sourced from the International Biathlon Union.

=== Olympic Games ===
0 medals

Event	Individual	Sprint	Pursuit	Mass start	Relay	Mixed relay
(South Korea) 2018 Pyeongchang	—	—	—	—	10th	—

=== World Championships ===
0 medals

Event	Individual	Sprint	Pursuit	Mass start	Relay	Mixed relay
(Finland) 2015 Kontiolahti	101st	—	—	—	—	—
(Norway) 2016 Oslo	69th	—	—	—	17th	—
(Austria) 2017 Hochfilzen	82nd	—	—	—	18th	—

*During Olympic seasons competitions are only held for those events not included in the Olympic program.
