= Biathlon at the 2014 Winter Olympics =

Biathlon at the XXII Olympic Winter Games
- Venue: Laura Biathlon & Ski Complex, Krasnaya Polyana, Russia
- Dates: 8–22 February
- No. of events: 11
- Competitors: 220 Quota limit

Biathlon at the 2014 Winter Olympics was held at the Laura Biathlon & Ski Complex near Krasnaya Polyana, Russia. The eleven events took place between 8–22 February 2014.

For the first time ever, a mixed relay event was staged after being voted onto the Olympic program in 2011.

== Competition schedule ==
The following is the competition schedule for all eleven events.

All times are (UTC+4).

Date	Time	Event
8 February	18:30	Men's 10 km sprint
9 February	18:30	Women's 7.5 km sprint
10 February	19:00	Men's 12.5 km pursuit
11 February	19:00	Women's 10 km pursuit
13 February	18:00	Men's 20 km individual
14 February	18:00	Women's 15 km individual
17 February	19:00	Women's 12.5 km mass start
18 February	14:30	Men's 15 km mass start
19 February	18:30	Mixed 4 x 6 km / 7.5 km relay
21 February	18:30	Women's 4 x 6 km relay
22 February	18:30	Men's 4 x 7.5 km relay

== Medal summary ==
Notably absent from the medals for biathlon in the 2014 Games were the German women who had won six medals in 2006 and five in 2010. The men's team meanwhile recovered from a poor Games in Vancouver to achieve two silver medals. France's women, who had won three medals in 2010, also missed the podium, as did Canada, despite some promising performances. Sweden's men were also expected to win a medal but they too missed out.

13 athletes went home with two or more medals with five athletes winning three medals each. Belarus's Darya Domracheva won three gold medals to be the most successful biathlete at the Games, while France's Martin Fourcade was the most successful male winning two gold and one silver medal. 2012/13 women's World Cup winner Tora Berger won a medal of each color, while team-mate Tiril Eckhoff won one gold and two bronze at her first Games. Czech athlete Ondřej Moravec won two silver and one bronze.

The biathlon portion was marred by German biathlete Evi Sachenbacher-Stehle's positive doping test. Sachenbacher-Stehle had finished fourth in both the mass start and the mixed relay but was disqualified from both events after testing positive for the banned substance methylhexanamine.

On 27 November 2017, Olga Vilukhina and Yana Romanova (both from Russia) were disqualified for doping violations. On 1 December 2017, their teammate Olga Zaitseva was also disqualified. On 24 September 2020, the Court of Arbitration for Sport removed the sanctions from Olga Vilukhina and Yana Romanova, but upheld them on their teammate Olga Zaitseva. Medals in the women's relay were redistributed by the IOC on 19 May 2022.

On 15 February 2020, the International Biathlon Union announced that because of a doping violation, Evgeny Ustyugov and Russian men's 4 x 7.5km relay team had been disqualified from the 2014 Olympics. The International Olympic Committee results affirm the decision. In May 2025 the final appeals of the decision were exhausted, leaving the IOC to formally reallocate Ustyugov's medals — a gold and a bronze from 2010 and a relay gold from 2014 — to other athletes. In September 2025 the IOC Executive Board approved the medal reallocations.

=== Medal table ===
Rank	Nation	Gold	Silver	Bronze	Total
1	Norway	3	2	2	7
2	Belarus	3	0	1	4
3	France	2	1	1	4
4	Germany	1	1	0	2
5	Ukraine	1	0	1	2
6	Slovakia	1	0	0	1
7	Czech Republic	0	3	3	6
8	Austria	0	2	0	2
9	Russia	0	1	1	2
10	Switzerland	0	1	0	1
11	Italy	0	0	1	1
11	Slovenia	0	0	1	1
Totals (12 entries)		11	11	11	33

=== Men's events ===
Event	Gold		Silver		Bronze	
Individual	Martin Fourcade; France	49:31.7	Erik Lesser; Germany	49:43.9	Evgeniy Garanichev; Russia	50:06.2
Sprint	Ole Einar Bjørndalen; Norway	24:33.5	Dominik Landertinger; Austria	24:34.8	Jaroslav Soukup; Czech Republic	24:39.2
Pursuit	Martin Fourcade; France	33:48.6	Ondřej Moravec; Czech Republic	34:02.7	Jean-Guillaume Béatrix; France	34:12.8
Mass start	Emil Hegle Svendsen; Norway	42:29.1	Martin Fourcade; France	42:29.1	Ondřej Moravec; Czech Republic	42:42.9
Relay	Germany; Erik Lesser; Daniel Böhm; Arnd Peiffer; Simon Schempp	1:12:19.4	Austria; Christoph Sumann; Daniel Mesotitsch; Simon Eder; Dominik Landertinger	1:12:45.7	Norway; Tarjei Bø; Johannes Thingnes Bø; Ole Einar Bjørndalen; Emil Hegle Svendsen	1:13:10.3

=== Women's events ===
Event	Gold		Silver		Bronze	
Individual	Darya Domracheva; Belarus	43:19.6	Selina Gasparin; Switzerland	44:35.3	Nadezhda Skardino; Belarus	44:57.8
Sprint	Anastasiya Kuzmina; Slovakia	21:06.8	Olga Vilukhina; Russia	21:26.7	Vita Semerenko; Ukraine	21:28.5
Pursuit	Darya Domracheva; Belarus	29:30.7	Tora Berger; Norway	30:08.3	Teja Gregorin; Slovenia	30:12.7
Mass start	Darya Domracheva; Belarus	35:25.6	Gabriela Koukalová; Czech Republic	35:45.8	Tiril Eckhoff; Norway	35:52.9
Relay	Ukraine; Vita Semerenko; Juliya Dzhyma; Valentyna Semerenko; Olena Pidhrushna	1:10:02.5	Norway; Fanny Welle-Strand Horn; Tiril Eckhoff; Ann Kristin Aafeldt Flatland; Tora Berger	1:10:40.1	Czech Republic; Eva Puskarčíková; Gabriela Koukalová; Jitka Landová; Veronika Vítková	1:11:25.7

=== Mixed event ===
Event	Gold		Silver		Bronze	
Relay	Norway; Tora Berger; Tiril Eckhoff; Ole Einar Bjørndalen; Emil Hegle Svendsen	1:09:17.0	Czech Republic; Veronika Vítková; Gabriela Koukalová; Jaroslav Soukup; Ondřej Moravec	1:09:49.6	Italy; Dorothea Wierer; Karin Oberhofer; Dominik Windisch; Lukas Hofer	1:10:15.2

== Participating NOCs ==
Thirty-five nations sent biathletes to compete in the events.

- Andorra
- Australia
- Austria
- Belarus
- Bosnia and Herzegovina
- Brazil
- Bulgaria
- Canada
- China
- Czech Republic
- Estonia
- Finland
- France
- Germany
- Great Britain
- Hungary
- Italy
- Japan
- Kazakhstan
- Latvia
- Lithuania
- Moldova
- Norway
- Poland
- Romania
- Russia
- Serbia
- Slovakia
- Slovenia
- South Korea
- Spain
- Sweden
- Switzerland
- Ukraine
- United States

== Qualification ==
A total quota of 220 athletes were allowed to compete at the Games (113 men and 107 women). Countries were assigned quotas using a combination of the Nation Cup scores of their top 3 athletes in the individual sprint and relay competitions at the 2012 and 2013 World Championships.
