= Alexey Volkov (biathlete) =

Russian biathlete

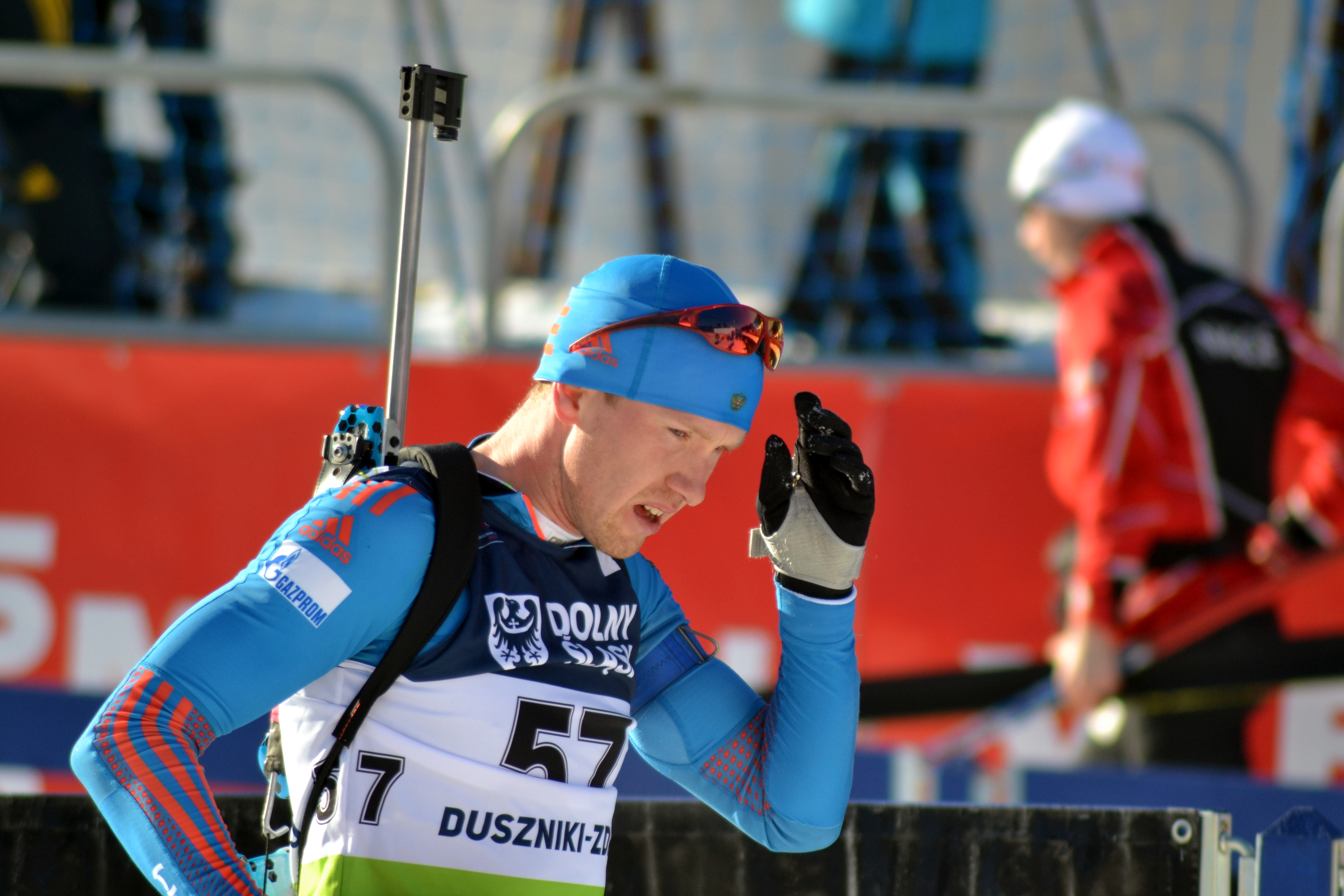
- Volkov at the 2017 European Championships

Personal information
- Born: 5 April 1988 (age 38) Raduzhny, Russian SFSR
- Height: 1.77 m (5 ft 10 in)

Sport
- Sport: Skiing

World Cup career
- Seasons: 2009/10–
- Indiv. podiums: 2
Medal record
Olympic Games
Disqualified	2014 Sochi	4 × 7.5 km relay
World Championships
Gold medal – first place	2017 Hochfilzen	4 × 7.5 km relay
Junior World Championships
Silver medal – second place	2009 Canmore	15 km individual
Silver medal – second place	2009 Canmore	4 × 7.5 km relay
European Championships
Gold medal – first place	2010 Otepää	12.5 km pursuit
Gold medal – first place	2011 Ridnaun	12.5 km pursuit
Gold medal – first place	2012 Osrblie	10 km sprint
Gold medal – first place	2012 Osrblie	12.5 km pursuit
Gold medal – first place	2015 Otepää	10 km sprint
Gold medal – first place	2015 Otepää	4x7.5 km relay
Gold medal – first place	2017 Duszniki-Zdrój	2x6+2x7.5 km mixed relay
Silver medal – second place	2010 Otepää	10 km sprint
Silver medal – second place	2011 Ridnaun	10 km sprint
Silver medal – second place	2010 Otepää	4x7.5 km relay
Bronze medal – third place	2010 Otepää	20 km individual
Bronze medal – third place	2012 Osrblie	4x7.5 km relay

Alexey Anatolyevich Volkov (Russian: Алексей Анатольевич Волков, born 5 April 1988) is a Russian former biathlete.

== Career ==
He competed at the Biathlon World Championships 2012 in Ruhpolding, and at the Biathlon World Championships 2013 in Nové Město na Moravě. He competed at the 2014 Winter Olympics in Sochi, in the individual and in the Men's relay. Together with Anton Shipulin, Evgeny Ustyugov and Dmitry Malyshko he won the gold medal in the Men's Relay.

== Biathlon results ==
All results are sourced from the International Biathlon Union.

=== Olympic Games ===
1 medal (1 gold)

Event	Individual	Sprint	Pursuit	Mass start	Relay	Mixed relay
(Russia) 2014 Sochi	64th	—	—	—	DSQ (1st)	—

=== World Championships ===
1 medal (1 gold)

Event	Individual	Sprint	Pursuit	Mass start	Relay	Mixed relay
(Germany) 2012 Ruhpolding	21st	—	—	—	—	—
(Czech Republic) 2013 Nové Město na Moravě	15th	—	—	—	—	—
(Finland) 2015 Kontiolahti	9th	—	—	—	4th	—
(Norway) 2016 Oslo Holmenkollen	39th	—	—	—	—	—
(Austria) 2017 Hochfilzen	11th	—	—	—	Gold	—

*During Olympic seasons competitions are only held for those events not included in the Olympic program.
**The mixed relay was added as an event in 2005.

=== Biathlon World Cup ===
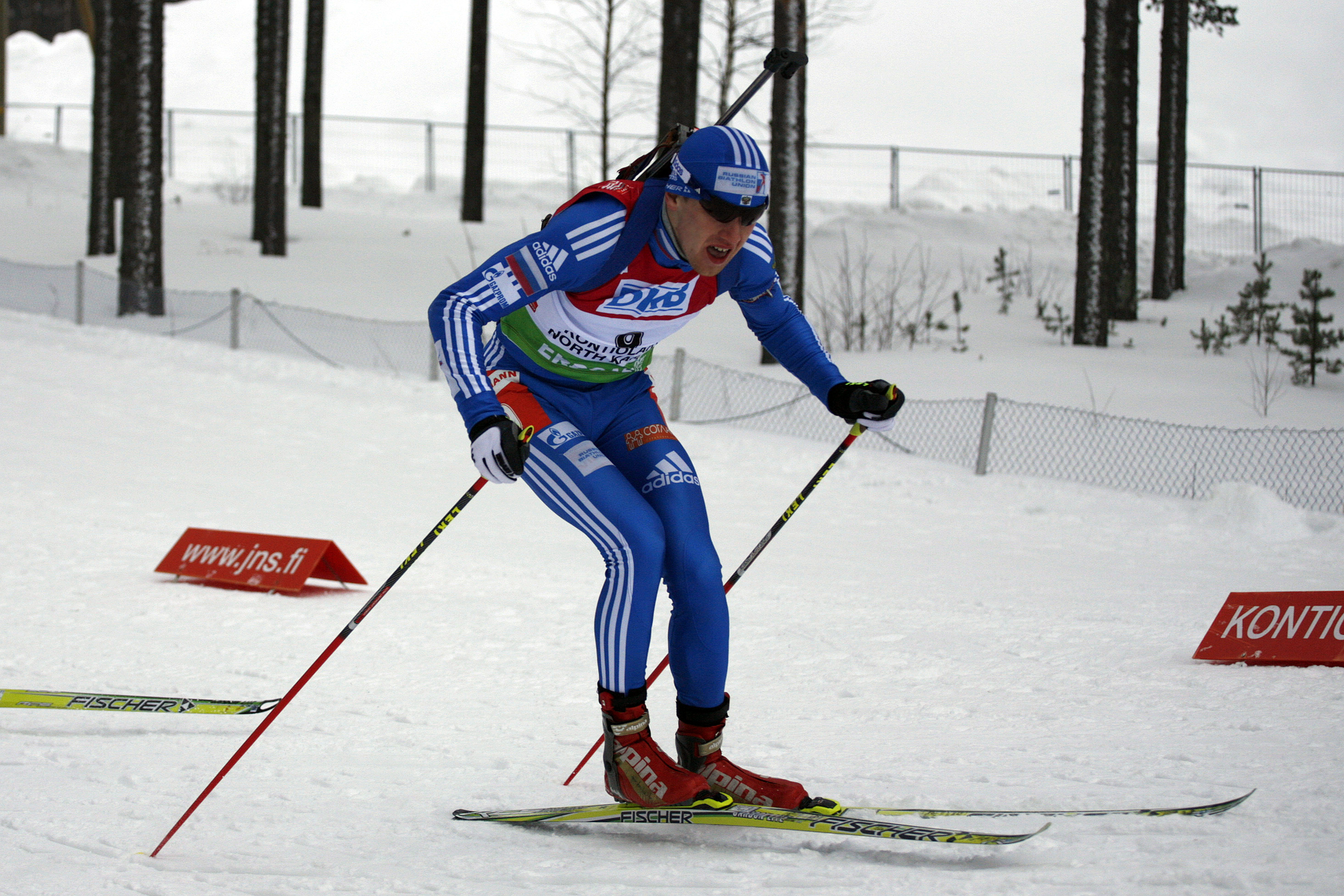
Alexey Volkov Kontiolahti 2010

World Cup rankings

Year	Overall	Sprint	Pursuit	Individual	Mass Start
2009–10	51st	45th	50th	—	—
2010–11	56th	82nd	48th	34th	—
2011–12	38th	43rd	40th	15th	32nd
2012–13	33rd	43rd	27th	20th	35th
2013–14	20th	38th	27th	4th	3rd

Overall record

Result	Individual	Sprint	Pursuit	Mass Start	Relay	Mixed Relay	Total		
Result	Individual	Sprint	Pursuit	Mass Start	Relay	Mixed Relay	Individual events	Team events	All events
1st place					1	2		3	3
2nd place	1			1	1		2	1	3
3rd place					2			2	2
Podiums	1			1	4	2	2	6	8
Top 10	1	5	5	1	5	3	12	8	20

Podiums

Date	Place	Competition	Placement
5 January 2014	(Germany) Oberhof	Mass Start	2nd
11 January 2014	(Germany) Ruhpolding	Individual	2nd
