= Jakov Fak =

Slovenian-Croatian biathlete (born 1987)

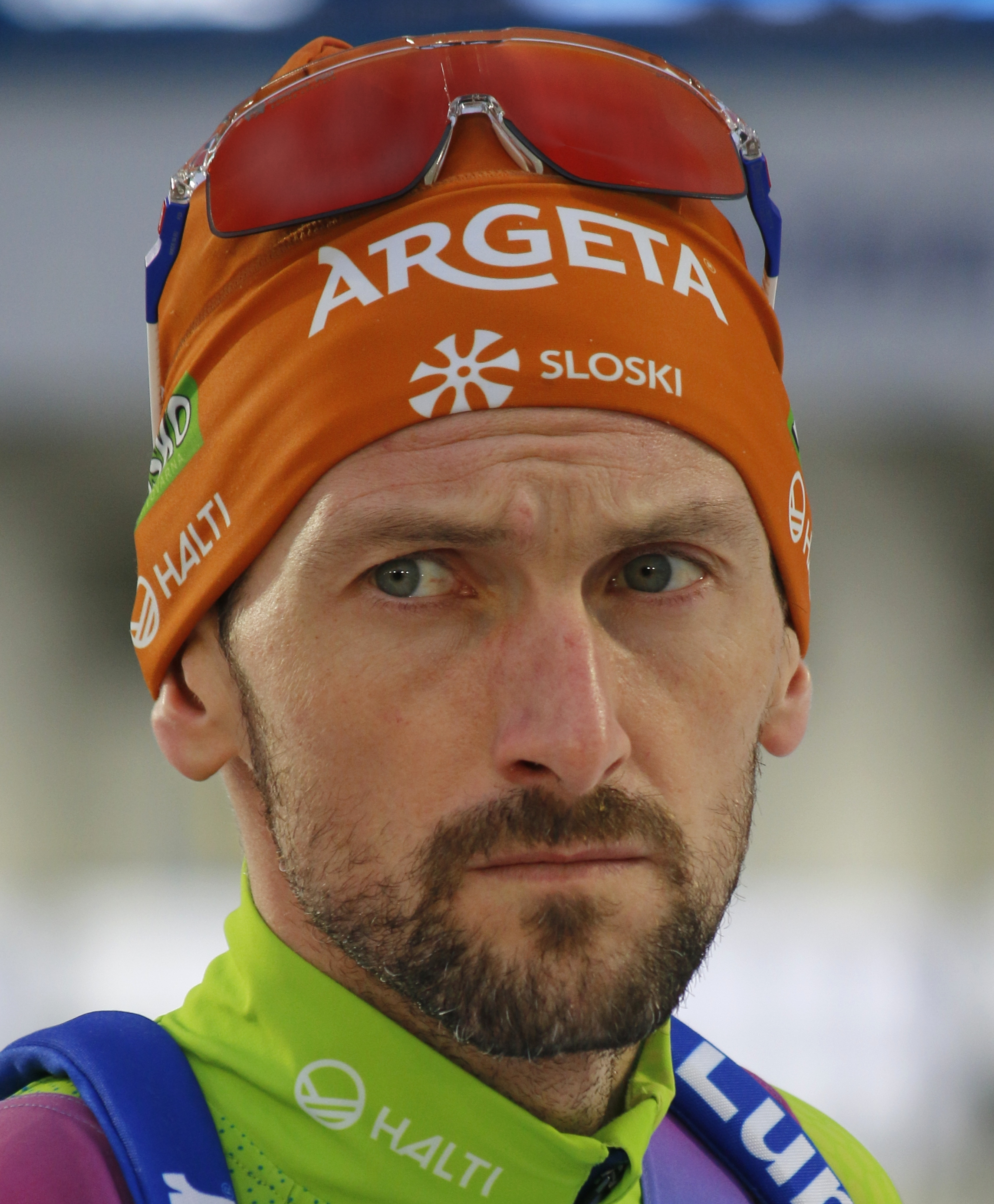
- Jakov Fak in Nové Město na Moravě, 2024

Personal information
- Born: 1 August 1987 (age 38) Rijeka, Croatia, Yugoslavia
- Height: 1.85 m (6 ft 1 in)

Sport

Professional information
- Sport: Biathlon
- Club: SD Pokljuka
- World Cup debut: 8 December 2006

Olympic Games
- Teams: 5 (2010, 2014, 2018, 2022, 2026)
- Medals: 2 (0 gold)

World Championships
- Teams: 13 (2007, 2008, 2009, 2012, 2013, 2015, 2016, 2019, 2020, 2021, 2023, 2024, 2025)
- Medals: 5 (2 gold)

World Cup
- Seasons: 11 (2006/07–)
- Individual victories: 9
- All victories: 9
- Individual podiums: 21
- All podiums: 22
Medal record
Men's biathlon
Representing Slovenia
Olympic Games
Silver medal – second place	2018 Pyeongchang	20 km individual
World Championships
Gold medal – first place	2012 Ruhpolding	20 km individual
Gold medal – first place	2015 Kontiolahti	15 km mass start
Silver medal – second place	2012 Ruhpolding	Mixed relay
Bronze medal – third place	2013 Nové Město	10 km sprint
Representing Croatia
Olympic Games
Bronze medal – third place	2010 Vancouver	10 km sprint
World Championships
Bronze medal – third place	2009 Pyeongchang	20 km individual
- Updated on 15 February 2018

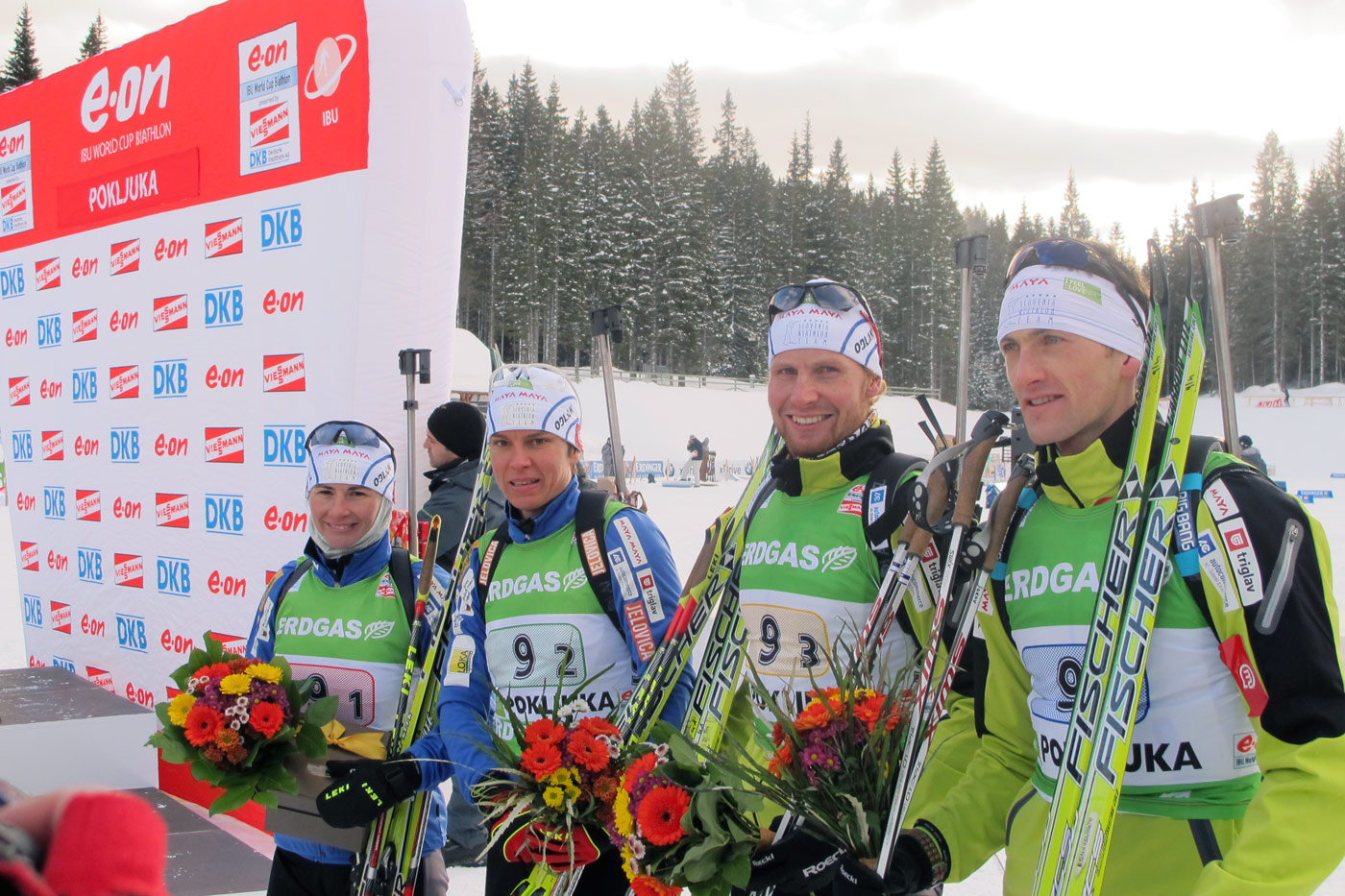
Fak in 2010, Slovenian mixed team.

Jakov Fak (born 1 August 1987) is a Croatian-Slovenian biathlete competing for Slovenia since 2010. As a member of the Croatian biathlon team, Fak won bronze medals at the 2009 World Championships and at the 2010 Winter Olympics, where he was also the Croatian flag bearer at the opening ceremony. In 2010, Fak switched his citizenship and started competing for Slovenia. Fak won four medals at the World Championships with the Slovenian team, including two gold and a silver medal at the 2018 Winter Olympics. In addition, Fak has nine victories in the World Cup.

== Career ==
Fak began to compete in biathlon in 2001 under the trainer Robert Petrović. His first international biathlon tournament was the Junior World Championships in Ridnaun in 2002, where his best result was 64th place in the Sprint event. Fak improved his performance in 2008, finishing in the top 10 at that year's Junior World Championships.

Since 2006, Fak has participated in the Biathlon World Cup. In his first race in the World Cup in Hochfilzen, Fak finished 107th. For a long time, his best performance was 47th place, which he reached in an Individual race in 2007 in Pokljuka. In 2007, he also participated in his first Biathlon World Championships, finishing 78th in the Sprint race and 93rd in the Individual.

The big breakthrough in Fak's career came in the 2008/09 season. In the opening race of the season, Fak came in 47th, but in the Individual, he earned his first World Cup points with a 38th position finish. In the third World Cup stage in Hochfilzen, Fak achieved a 16th-place finish.

=== 2009 Biathlon World Championships ===
Despite several respectable performances in the World Cup, Fak's performance at the Biathlon World Championships 2009 was a huge surprise. In the opening sprint race, Fak improved his career-best performance by two more places, finishing 14th. However, he couldn't improve that performance in the pursuit, falling back to 25th place. The big surprise came in the 20 kilometres individual race, where Fak won the bronze medal. A perfect score in the final range would have brought Fak a gold medal; however, after one miss, Fak had to battle very hard for at least some medal and, in the end, beat Simon Fourcade by less than a second to win the bronze. Thus, Jakov Fak won Croatia their first-ever World Championship medal in biathlon.

=== 2010 Winter Olympics ===
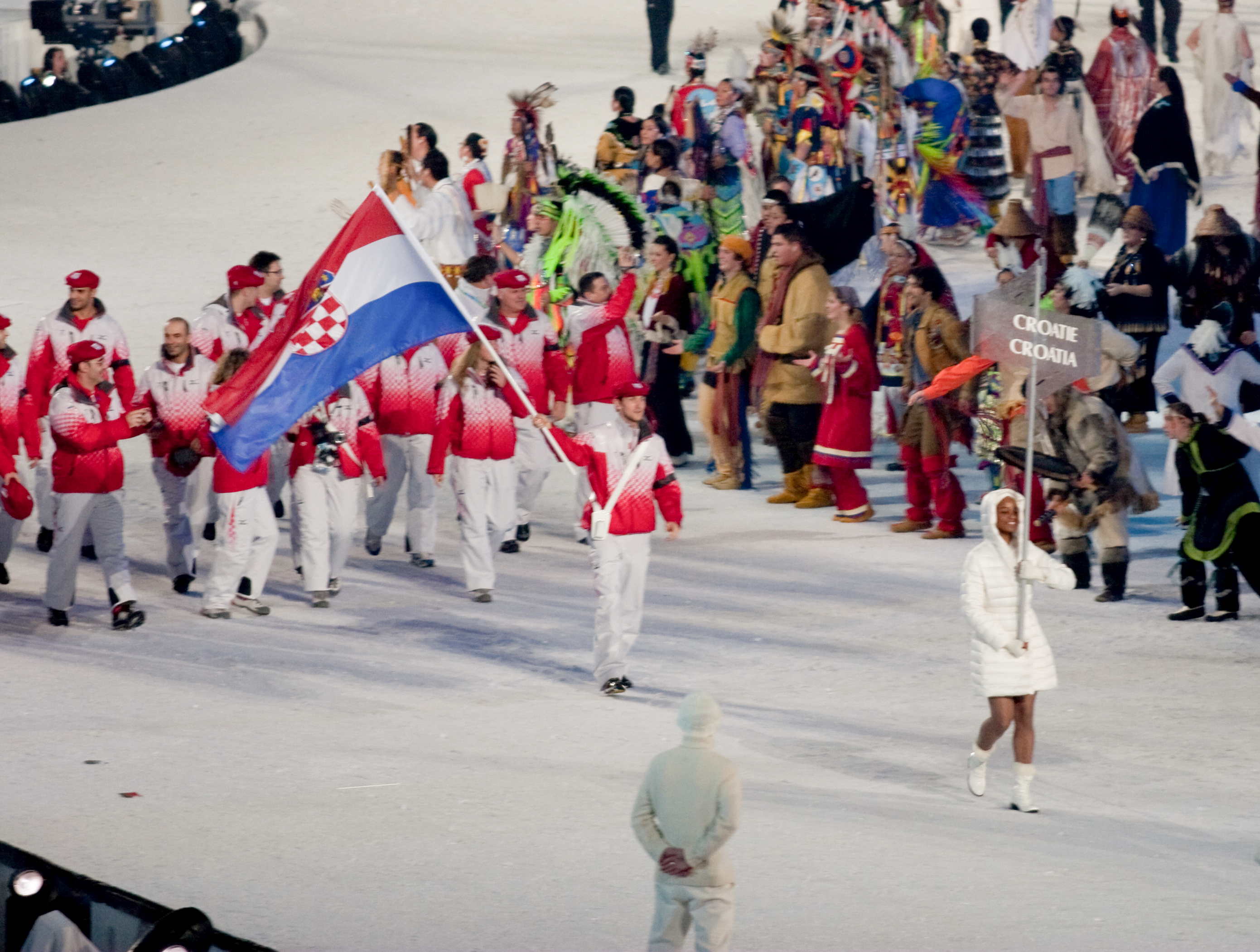
Jakov Fak was the flag-bearer for Croatia at the opening ceremony of the 2010 Winter Olympics.

After his success in the World Championships, the expectations were high, but Fak's World Cup race performances in the 2009–10 season were substandard. He managed to win his first points in the World Cup only on 23 January 2010, with a 24th place in Antholz, and was largely forgotten by the public by that time. At the 2010 Winter Olympics in Vancouver, Fak once again created a sensation by winning the bronze medal in the 10 km sprint.

=== Switch of Citizenship ===
In July 2010, it was announced in the Slovenian Press that Fak would represent Slovenia in an international competition. On 19 November, the switch to the Slovenian Biatlethe team was officially announced and Fak received his Slovenian passport on 24 November, enabling him to compete for Slovenia.

=== Career threatening injury ===
At the World Cup races in the US in 2011, which were held in freezing temperatures, Jakov Fak suffered 3rd-degree frostbite to his trigger finger. It was feared his finger might have to be amputated which would undoubtedly have ended his career as a biathlete. Jakov and his coaches decided to pull out of the Biathlon World Championships 2011 in Russia to focus on recovering from his injury and saving his finger.

=== 2012 Biathlon World Championships ===
After missing the 2011 World Championship due to the injury, Fak entered the 2012 World Championship as a member of the Slovenian team. He won two medals, a silver in the mixed relay (together with Andreja Mali, Teja Gregorin, and Klemen Bauer). Although Slovenia crossed the finish line as first, 8.2 seconds in front of Norway, the jury awarded bonus seconds to the Scandinavians because one target did not go down despite their last runner Ole Einar Bjørndalen hitting it and therefore had to take an additional penalty loop, which put them ahead of Slovenia into the first place. A couple of days later, Fak won the gold medal at the 20 km individual, thus winning the first gold medal for Slovenia at World Championships.

== Biathlon results ==
All results are sourced from the International Biathlon Union.

=== Olympic Games ===
2 medals (1 silver, 1 bronze)

Event	Individual	Sprint	Pursuit	Mass start	Relay	Mixed relay
Representing Croatia
(Canada) 2010 Vancouver	51st	Bronze	25th	9th	—	—N/a
Representing Slovenia
(Russia) 2014 Sochi	32nd	10th	31st	4th	6th	—
(South Korea) 2018 Pyeongchang	Silver	23rd	47th	10th	—	14th
(China) 2022 Beijing	29th	26th	29th	—	11th	20th
(Italy) 2026 Milano Cortina	29th	25th	14th	16th	9th	—

*The mixed relay was added as an event in 2014.

=== World Championships ===
5 medals (2 gold, 1 silver, 2 bronze)

Event	Individual	Sprint	Pursuit	Mass start	Relay	Mixed relay	Single mixed relay
Representing Croatia
(Italy) 2007 Antholz-Anterselva	93rd	78th	—	—	—	—	—N/a
(Sweden) 2008 Östersund	DNS	69th	—	—	—	—	—N/a
(South Korea) 2009 Pyeongchang	Bronze	14th	25th	19th	—	—	—N/a
Representing Slovenia
(Germany) 2012 Ruhpolding	Gold	11th	8th	—	—	Silver	—N/a
(Czech Republic) 2013 Nové Město	20th	Bronze	6th	19th	13th	5th	—N/a
(Finland) 2015 Kontiolahti	10th	14th	8th	Gold	8th	15th	—N/a
(Norway) 2016 Holmenkollen	6th	39th	5th	7th	—	13th	—N/a
(Sweden) 2019 Östersund	42nd	17th	26th	14th	5th	—	—
(Italy) 2020 Antholz-Anterselva	4th	45th	21st	15th	5th	—	—
(Slovenia) 2021 Pokljuka	20th	34th	34th	5th	8th	16th	13th
(Germany) 2023 Oberhof	—	63rd	—	—	9th	—	7th
(Czech Republic) 2024 Nové Město na Moravě	9th	27th	24th	6th	11th	9th	18th
(Switzerland) 2025 Lenzerheide	6th	11th	6th	24th	13th	11th	6th

*During Olympic seasons, competitions are only held for those events not included in the Olympic program.
**The single mixed relay was added as an event in 2019.

=== Individual victories ===
9 victories (1 In, 3 Sp, 2 Pu, 2 MS, 1 SI)

Season	Date	Location	Discipline	Level
2011–12; 1 victory (1 In)	6 March 2012	(Germany) Ruhpolding	20 km individual	Biathlon World Championships
2012–13; 2 victories (1 Sp, 1 Pu)	8 December 2012	(Austria) Hochfilzen	12.5 km pursuit	Biathlon World Cup
2012–13; 2 victories (1 Sp, 1 Pu)	13 December 2012	(Slovenia) Pokljuka	10 km sprint	Biathlon World Cup
2013–14; 1 victory (1 Sp)	20 March 2014	(Norway) Oslo Holmenkollen	10 km sprint	Biathlon World Cup
2014–15; 4 victories (1 Sp, 1 Pu, 2 MS)	7 February 2015	(Czech Republic) Nové Město	10 km sprint	Biathlon World Cup
2014–15; 4 victories (1 Sp, 1 Pu, 2 MS)	8 February 2015	(Czech Republic) Nové Město	12.5 km pursuit	Biathlon World Cup
2014–15; 4 victories (1 Sp, 1 Pu, 2 MS)	15 March 2015	(Finland) Kontiolahti	15 km mass start	Biathlon World Championships
2014–15; 4 victories (1 Sp, 1 Pu, 2 MS)	22 March 2015	(Russia) Khanty-Mansiysk	15 km mass start	Biathlon World Cup
2024–25; 1 victory (1 SI)	13 March 2025	(Slovenia) Pokljuka	15 km short individual	Biathlon World Cup

*Results are from UIPMB and IBU races which include the Biathlon World Cup, Biathlon World Championships and the Winter Olympic Games.

Winter Olympics
Preceded by Janica Kostelić	Flagbearer for Croatia; Vancouver 2010	Succeeded by Ivica Kostelić
