= Ondřej Moravec =

Czech biathlete

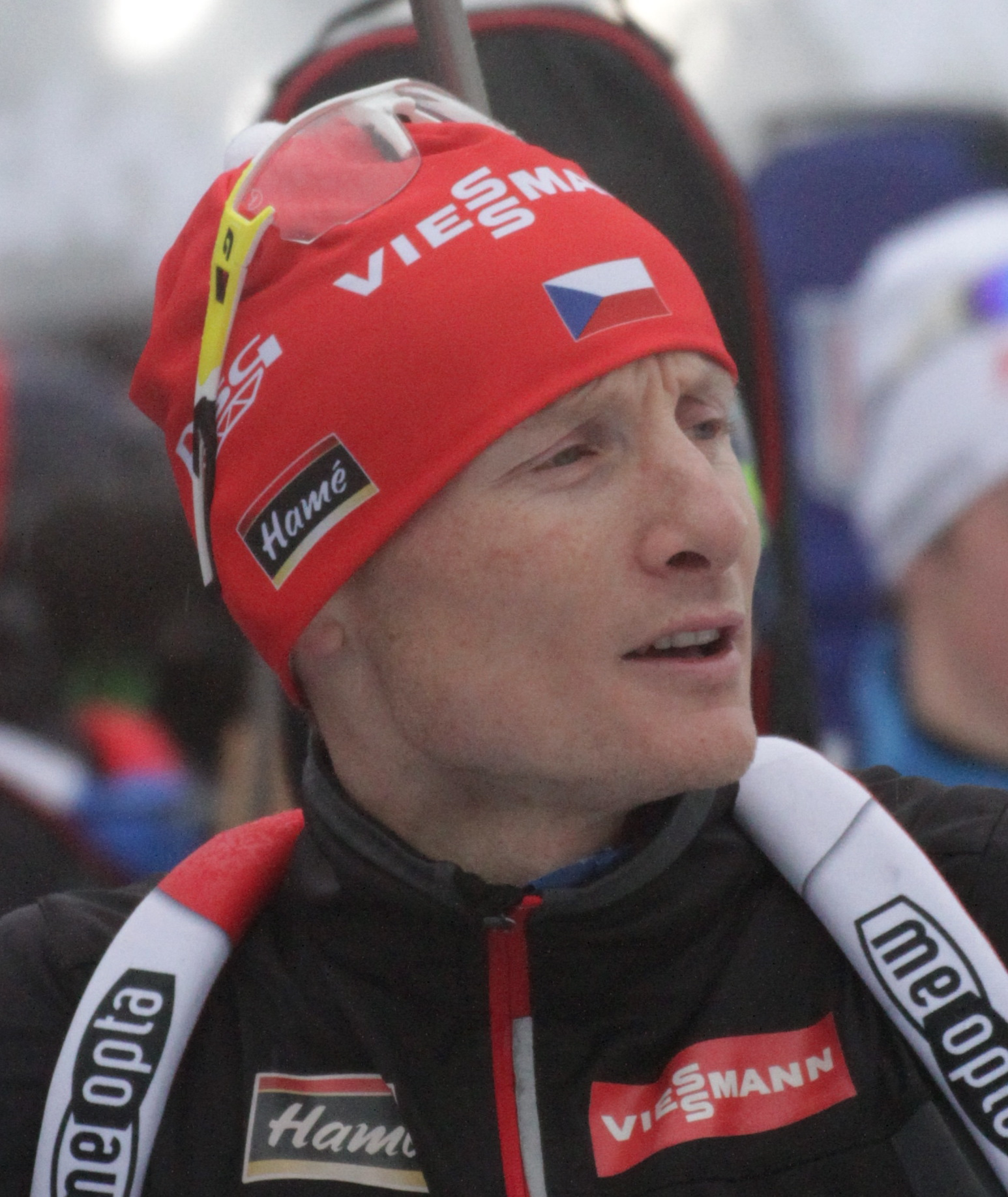
- Moravec on Oberhof World Cup in 2018.

Personal information
- Born: 9 June 1984 (age 42) Ústí nad Orlicí, ČSR, Czechoslovakia
- Height: 1.81 m (5 ft 11 in)
- Weight: 71 kg (157 lb)

Sport

Professional information
- Sport: Biathlon
- Club: SKP Jablonec
- Skis: Fischer
- Rifle: Anschütz
- World Cup debut: 16 January 2003

Olympic Games
- Teams: 4 (2006, 2010, 2014, 2018)
- Medals: 3 (0 gold)

World Championships
- Teams: 7 (2007, 2008, 2011–2015, 2017, 2020)
- Medals: 6 (1 gold)

World Cup
- Seasons: 19 (2002/03–2020/21)
- Individual victories: 1
- All victories: 3
- Individual podiums: 12
- All podiums: 22
Medal record
Men's biathlon
Olympic Games
Silver medal – second place	2014 Sochi	12.5 km pursuit
Silver medal – second place	2014 Sochi	Mixed relay
Bronze medal – third place	2014 Sochi	15 km mass start
World Championships
Gold medal – first place	2015 Kontiolahti	Mixed relay
Silver medal – second place	2015 Kontiolahti	15 km mass start
Silver medal – second place	2017 Hochfilzen	20 km individual
Bronze medal – third place	2013 Nové Město	Mixed relay
Bronze medal – third place	2015 Kontiolathi	20 km individual
Bronze medal – third place	2020 Antholz	Mixed relay
Junior World Championships
Silver medal – second place	2002 Ridnaun	4 × 7.5 km relay
Silver medal – second place	2004 Haute Maurienne	4 × 7.5 km relay
Silver medal – second place	2005 Kontiolahti	15 km individual
Bronze medal – third place	2003 Kościelisko	15 km individual
Bronze medal – third place	2003 Kościelisko	12.5 km pursuit
Bronze medal – third place	2003 Kościelisko	4 × 7.5 km relay
Youth World Championships
Bronze medal – third place	2002 Ridnaun	7.5 km sprint
Bronze medal – third place	2002 Ridnaun	10 km pursuit

Ondřej Moravec (Czech pronunciation: [ˈondr̝ɛj ˈmoravɛts]; born 9 June 1984) is a former Czech biathlete.

== Life and career ==
Moravec represented the Czech Republic at the 2006, 2010, 2014 and 2018. At the 2014 Winter Olympics, he won silver medals in both the pursuit and the mixed relay (together with Jaroslav Soukup, Veronika Vítková and Gabriela Soukalová) and a bronze medal in the mass start. His best World Cup overall finish yet was 6th in the 2014–15 season. Since 2024, he is the coach of the Czech men's biathlon national team.

== Biathlon results ==
All results are sourced from the International Biathlon Union.

=== Olympic Games ===
3 medals – (2 silver, 1 bronze)

Event	Individual	Sprint	Pursuit	Mass start	Relay	Mixed relay^{[a]}
(Italy) 2006 Turin	—	32nd	39th	—	6th	—N/a
(Canada) 2010 Vancouver	—	67th	—	—	—	—N/a
(Russia) 2014 Sochi	18th	8th	Silver	Bronze	11th	Silver
(South Korea) 2018 Pyeongchang	12th	29th	51st	11th	7th	8th

a. ^{1} The mixed relay was added as an event in 2014.

=== World Championships ===
6 medals – (1 gold, 2 silver, 3 bronze)

Event^{[a]}	Individual	Sprint	Pursuit	Mass start	Relay	Mixed relay	Single mixed relay^{[b]}
(Italy) 2007 Antholz-Anterselva	—	56th	49th	—	5th	8th	—N/a
(Sweden) 2008 Östersund	44th	—	—	—	7th	12th	—N/a
(Russia) 2011 Khanty-Mansiysk	—	82nd	—	—	10th	11th	—N/a
(Germany) 2012 Ruhpolding	12th	18th	15th	13th	9th	8th	—N/a
(Czech Republic) 2013 Nové Město	4th	35th	31st	4th	6th	Bronze	—N/a
(Finland) 2015 Kontiolahti	Bronze	9th	9th	Silver	6th	Gold	—N/a
(Norway) 2016 Oslo Holmenkollen	35th	59th	DNS	—	5th	—	—N/a
(Austria) 2017 Hochfilzen	Silver	5th	5th	16th	10th	7th	—N/a
(Sweden) 2019 Östersund	37th	92nd	—	—	4th	6th	9th
(Italy) 2020 Antholz-Anterselva	16th	46th	22nd	11th	13th	Bronze	—
(Slovenia) 2021 Pokljuka	11th	55th	46th	—	13th	11th	—

a. ^{1} ^{2} During Olympic seasons competitions are only held for those events not included in the Olympic program.
b. ^{1} The mixed relay was added as an event in 2005.

=== Junior/Youth World Championships ===
- 8 medals – (3 silver, 5 bronze)

Event	Individual	Sprint	Pursuit	Relay
(Russia) 2001 Khanty-Mansiysk	—	33rd	39th	10th
(Italy) 2002 Ridnaun	15th	Bronze	Bronze	Silver
(Poland) 2003 Kościelisko	Bronze	4th	Bronze	Bronze
(France) 2004 Haute-Maurienne	37th	26th	10th	Silver
(Finland) 2005 Kontiolahti	Silver	39th	22nd	5th

=== Individual podiums ===
- 1 victory – (1 MS)
- 14 podiums – (4 Sp, 3 Pu, 4 MS, 3 In)

No.	Season	Date	Location	Discipline	Level	Place
1	2012/13	15 December 2012	Pokljuka, Slovenia	12.5 km Pursuit	World Cup	2nd
2	2012/13	6 January 2013	Oberhof, Germany	12.5 km Pursuit	World Cup	3rd
3	2012/13	3 March 2013	Oslo Holmenkollen, Norway	15 km Mass Start	World Cup	1st
4	2013/14	14 December 2013	Annecy, France	10 km Sprint	World Cup	2nd
5	2013/14	10 February 2014	Sochi, Russia	12.5 km Pursuit	Olympic Games^{[a]}	2nd
6	2013/14	18 February 2014	Sochi, Russia	15 km Mass Start	Olympic Games^{[a]}	3rd
7	2013/14	13 March 2014	Kontiolahti, Finland	10 km Sprint	World Cup	3rd
8	2014/15	6 December 2014	Östersund, Sweden	10 km Sprint	World Cup	2nd
9	2014/15	12 March 2015	Kontiolahti, Finland	20 km Individual	World Championships	3rd
10	2014/15	15 March 2015	Kontiolahti, Finland	15 km Mass Start	World Championships	2nd
11	2015/16	10 January 2016	Ruhpolding, Germany	15 km Mass Start	World Cup	2nd
12	2016/17	16 February 2017	Hochfilzen, Austria	20 km Individual	World Championships	2nd
13	2016/17	10 March 2017	Kontiolahti, Finland	10 km Sprint	World Cup	2nd
14	2017/18	10 January 2018	Ruhpolding, Germany	20 km Individual	World Cup	2nd

a. ^{1} ^{2} 2014 Winter Olympics races are not included in the 2013–14 World Cup scoring system.

* Results are from UIPMB and IBU races which include the Biathlon World Cup, Biathlon World Championships and the Winter Olympic Games.

=== Overall record ===
Result	Individual	Sprint	Pursuit	Mass Start	Relay	Mixed Relay^{[a]}	Total		
Result	Individual	Sprint	Pursuit	Mass Start	Relay	Mixed Relay^{[a]}	Individual events	Team events	All events
1st place	–	–	–	1	–	2	1	2	3
2nd place	1	3	2	2	1	3	8	4	12
3rd place	1	1	1	1	1	3	4	4	8
Podiums	2	4	3	4	2	8	13	10	23
Top 10	5	16	10	10	38	15	41	53	94
Points^{[b]}	18	58	48	25	49	17	149	66	215
Other	17	51	21	–	1^{[c]}	–	89	1	90
Starts	35	109	69	25	50	17	238	67	305

a. ^{1} Includes mixed relay and single mixed relay, the event involves one male and one female biathlete each completing two legs consisting of one prone and one standing shoot.
b. ^{1} Until 2007–08 season, top-30 were awarded with World Cup points and biathlete got 50 points for the win. Starting from 2008 to 2009 season another points system is applied in World Cup, top-40 are awarded with World Cup points and winner got 60 points. Results in "Points" row is represented according to the applied scoring system in corresponding season.
c. ^{1} Did not finish the race (DNF).

* Statistics as of 19 March 2017.

=== Shooting ===
Shooting	2002–03 season		2003–04 season		2004–05 season		2005–06 season		2006–07 season		2007–08 season		2008–09 season		2009–10 season	
Prone position	16 / 21	76.2%	20 / 37	54.1%	25 / 30	84.5%	97 / 113	85.8%	125 / 179	69.8%	103 / 147	70.1%	64 / 102	62.7%	84 / 111	75.7%
Standing position	16 / 23	69.6%	26 / 38	68.4%	27 / 30	77.0%	93 / 112	83.0%	134 / 175	76.6%	116 / 149	77.9%	81 / 95	85.3%	90 / 108	83.3%
Total	32 / 44	72.7%	46 / 75	61.3%	52 / 60	86.7%	190 / 225	84.4%	259 / 354	73.2%	219 / 296	74.0%	145 / 197	73.6%	174 / 219	79.5%

Shooting	2010–11 season		2011–12 season		2012–13 season		2013–14 season		2014–15 season		2015–16 season		2016–17 season		Career	
Prone position	97 / 117	82.9%	164 / 205	80.0%	218 / 245	89.0%	217 / 247	87.9%	204 / 248	82.3%	169 / 203	83.3%	217 / 247	87.9%	1820 / 2252	80.8%
Standing position	86 / 113	76.1%	173 / 208	83.2%	206 / 248	83.1%	219 / 248	88.3%	220 / 244	90.2%	176 / 201	87.6%	213 / 244	87.3%	1876 / 2236	83.9%
Total	183 / 230	79.6%	337 / 413	81.6%	424 / 493	86.0%	436 / 495	88.1%	424 / 492	86.2%	345 / 404	85.4%	430 / 491	87.6%	3696 / 4488	82.4%

- Results in all IBU World Cup races, Olympics and World Championships including relay events and disqualified races. Statistics as of 19 March 2017.
