= Jaroslav Soukup =

Czech biathlete (born 1982)

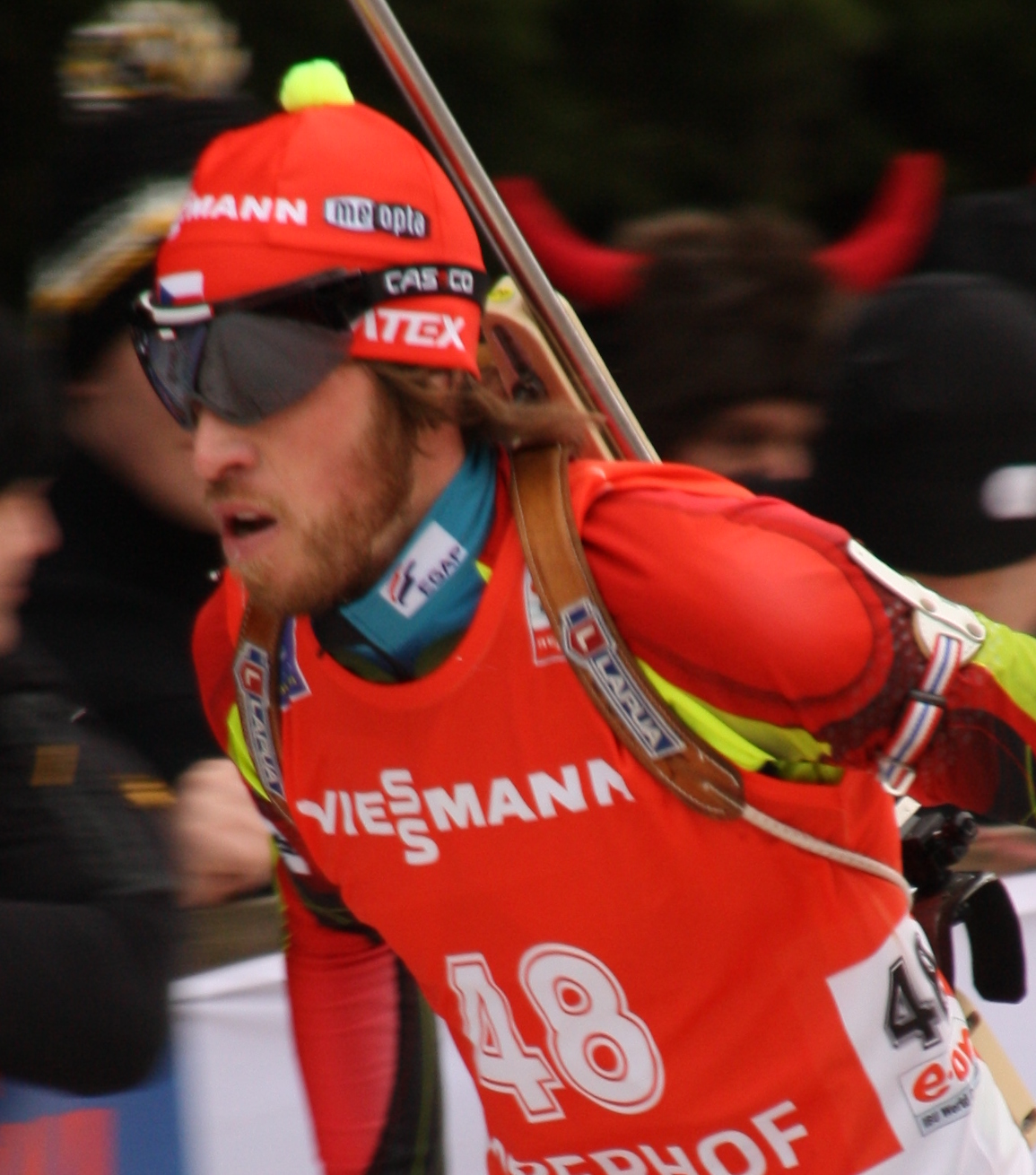

Personal information
- Full name: Jaroslav Soukup
- Born: 12 July 1982 (age 43) Jičín, Czechoslovakia
- Height: 1.83 m (6 ft 0 in)

Sport

Professional information
- Club: SKP Jablonex
Medal record
Men's biathlon
Representing Czech Republic
Olympic Games
Silver medal – second place	2014 Sochi	Mixed relay
Bronze medal – third place	2014 Sochi	10 km sprint
World Championships
Bronze medal – third place	2012 Ruhpolding	20 km individual
Bronze medal – third place	2013 Nové Město	Mixed relay
Junior World Championships
Silver medal – second place	2002 Ridnaun	4 × 7.5 km relay
Bronze medal – third place	2003 Kościelisko	4 × 7.5 km relay

Jaroslav Soukup (Czech pronunciation: [ˈjaroslaf ˈsoukup], born 12 July 1982) is a retired Czech biathlete.

== Career ==
His first World Cup podium was in Östersund at the pursuit competition on 4 December 2011.

Soukup won a bronze medal in biathlon at the 2014 Winter Olympics in sprint and a silver medal in the Mixed relay (together with Ondřej Moravec, Gabriela Soukalová and Veronika Vítková).

=== Olympic Games ===
Event	Individual	Sprint	Pursuit	Mass Start	Relay	Mixed Relay
(Canada) 2010 Vancouver	30th	52nd	51st	–	7th	—N/a
(Russia) 2014 Sochi	17th	Bronze	20th	24th	11th	Silver
(South Korea) 2018 Pyeongchang	–	–	–	–	7th	–

=== World Championships ===
2 medals (2 bronze)

Event	Individual	Sprint	Pursuit	Mass start	Relay	Mixed relay	Single mixed relay
(Italy) 2007 Antholz-Anterselva	53rd	32nd	33rd	—	5th	—	—N/a
(Sweden) 2008 Östersund	—	58th	49th	—	7th	12th	—N/a
(South Korea) 2009 Pyeongchang	11th	37th	47th	—	10th	—	—N/a
(Russia) 2010 Khanty-Mansiysk	—N/a	—N/a	—N/a	—N/a	—N/a	7th	—N/a
(Russia) 2011 Khanty-Mansiysk	79th	76th	—	—	10th	—	—N/a
(Germany) 2012 Ruhpolding	Bronze	43rd	21st	11th	9th	—	—N/a
(Czech Republic) 2013 Nové Město	39th	27th	—	—	6th	Bronze	—N/a
(Finland) 2015 Kontiolahti	36th	11th	18th	28th	6th	—	—N/a
(Norway) 2016 Oslo Holmenkollen	23rd	60th	41st	—	5th	—	—N/a
