= Mario Dolder =

Swiss biathlete

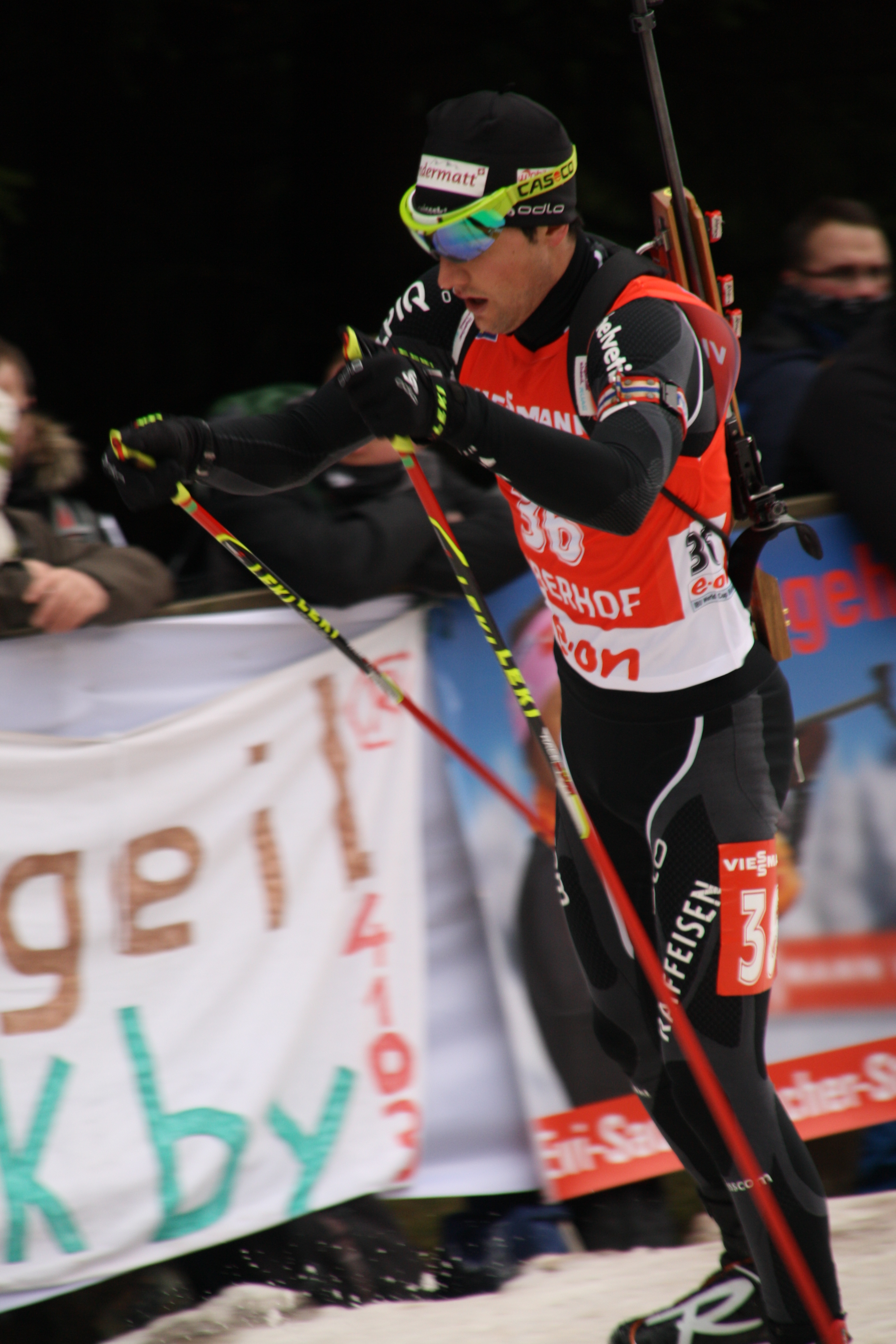
- Dolder in 2014

Personal information
- Nationality: Swiss
- Born: 22 June 1990 (age 36)

Sport
- Country: Switzerland
- Sport: Biathlon
Medal record
Youth World Championships
| Bronze medal – third place | 2009 Canmore | 7.5 km sprint |

Mario Dolder (born 22 June 1990) is a Swiss former biathlete. He competed in the 2014/15 World Cup season, and represented Switzerland at the Biathlon World Championships 2015 in Kontiolahti.

== Biathlon results ==
All results are sourced from the International Biathlon Union.

=== Olympic Games ===
0 medals

| Event | Individual | Sprint | Pursuit | Mass start | Relay | Mixed relay |
|---|---|---|---|---|---|---|
| (South Korea) 2018 Pyeongchang | 49th | 64th | — | — | 15th | — |

=== World Championships ===
0 medals

| Event | Individual | Sprint | Pursuit | Mass start | Relay | Mixed relay | Single mixed relay |
|---|---|---|---|---|---|---|---|
| (Germany) 2012 Ruhpolding | 64th | — | — | — | — | — | — |
| (Czech Republic) 2013 Nové Město | 58th | 79th | — | — | 17th | — | — |
| (Finland) 2015 Kontiolahti | 92nd | 28th | 32nd | — | 7th | 13th | — |
| (Norway) 2016 Oslo | 74th | 66th | — | — | 10th | — | — |
| (Austria) 2017 Hochfilzen | 64th | 15th | 29th | 30th | 16th | — | — |
| (Sweden) 2019 Östersund | 87th | — | — | — | 11th | — | — |
| (Italy) 2020 Rasen-Antholz | DNS | 38th | 36th | — | 15th | — | — |

*During Olympic seasons competitions are only held for those events not included in the Olympic program.
**The single mixed relay was added as an event in 2019.
