= 2014–15 Biathlon World Cup – Overall Women =

== 2013–14 Top 3 Standings ==
Medal	Athlete	Points
Gold:	(Finland) Kaisa Mäkäräinen	860
Silver:	(Norway) Tora Berger	856
Bronze:	(Belarus) Darya Domracheva	793

== Events summary ==
Event:	Winner:	Second:	Third:
Östersund 15 km Individual details	Darya Domracheva; Belarus	Kaisa Mäkäräinen; Finland	Valj Semerenko; Ukraine
Östersund 7.5 km Sprint details	Tiril Eckhoff; Norway	Veronika Vítková; Czech Republic	Kaisa Mäkäräinen; Finland
Östersund 10 km Pursuit details	Kaisa Mäkäräinen; Finland	Valj Semerenko; Ukraine	Dorothea Wierer; Italy
Hochfilzen 7.5 km Sprint details	Kaisa Mäkäräinen; Finland	Karin Oberhofer; Italy	Tiril Eckhoff; Norway
Hochfilzen 10 km Pursuit details	Kaisa Mäkäräinen; Finland	Anaïs Bescond; France	Olga Podchufarova; Russia
Pokljuka 7.5 km Sprint details	Gabriela Soukalová; Czech Republic	Dorothea Wierer; Italy	Valj Semerenko; Ukraine
Pokljuka 10 km Pursuit details	Darya Domracheva; Belarus	Kaisa Mäkäräinen; Finland	Valj Semerenko; Ukraine
Pokljuka 12.5 km Mass Start details	Kaisa Mäkäräinen; Finland	Anaïs Bescond; France	Nadezhda Skardino; Belarus
Oberhof 7.5 km Sprint details	Veronika Vítková; Czech Republic	Dorothea Wierer; Italy	Nicole Gontier; Italy
Oberhof 12.5 km Mass start details	Darya Domracheva; Belarus	Veronika Vítková; Czech Republic	Tiril Eckhoff; Norway
Ruhpolding 7.5 km Sprint details	Fanny Welle-Strand Horn; Norway	Darya Domracheva; Belarus	Tiril Eckhoff; Norway
Ruhpolding 12.5 km Mass Start details	Darya Domracheva; Belarus	Franziska Preuß; Germany	Veronika Vítková; Czech Republic
Antholz 7.5 km Sprint details	Darya Domracheva; Belarus	Kaisa Mäkäräinen; Finland	Laura Dahlmeier; Germany
Antholz 10 km Pursuit details	Darya Domracheva; Belarus	Daria Virolaynen; Russia	Kaisa Mäkäräinen; Finland
Nové Město 7.5 km Sprint details	Laura Dahlmeier; Germany	Franziska Hildebrand; Germany	Veronika Vítková; Czech Republic
Nové Město 10 km Pursuit details	Darya Domracheva; Belarus	Kaisa Mäkäräinen; Finland	Laura Dahlmeier; Germany
Holmenkollen 15 km Individual details	Kaisa Mäkäräinen; Finland	Darya Domracheva; Belarus	Veronika Vítková; Czech Republic
Holmenkollen 7.5 km Sprint details	Darya Domracheva; Belarus	Laura Dahlmeier; Germany	Marie Dorin Habert; France
World Championships 7.5 km Sprint details	Marie Dorin Habert; France	Weronika Nowakowska-Ziemniak; Poland	Valj Semerenko; Ukraine
World Championships 10 km Pursuit details	Marie Dorin Habert; France	Laura Dahlmeier; Germany	Weronika Nowakowska-Ziemniak; Poland
World Championships 15 km Individual details	Ekaterina Yurlova; Russia	Gabriela Soukalová; Czech Republic	Kaisa Mäkäräinen; Finland
World Championships 12.5 km Mass Start details	Valj Semerenko; Ukraine	Franziska Preuß; Germany	Karin Oberhofer; Italy
Khanty-Mansiysk 7.5 km Sprint details	Kaisa Mäkäräinen; Finland	Laura Dahlmeier; Germany	Darya Domracheva; Belarus
Khanty-Mansiysk 10 km Pursuit details	Darya Domracheva; Belarus	Laura Dahlmeier; Germany	Franziska Preuß; Germany
Khanty-Mansiysk 12.5 km Mass start details	Laura Dahlmeier; Germany	Gabriela Soukalová; Czech Republic	Marie Dorin Habert; France

== Standings ==
#	Name	ÖST IN	ÖST SP	ÖST PU	HOC SP	HOC PU	POK SP	POK PU	POK MS	OBE SP	OBE MS	RUH SP	RUH MS	ANT SP	ANT PU	NOV SP	NOV PU	HOL IN	HOL SP	WCH SP	WCH PU	WCH IN	WCH MS	KHA SP	KHA PU	KHA MS	Total
1.	Darya Domracheva (BLR)	60	40	43	34	28	38	60	DNF	23	60	54	60	60	60	43	60	54	60	~~16~~	36	25	43	48	60	43	1092
2	Kaisa Mäkäräinen (FIN)	54	48	60	60	60	26	54	60	21	43	36	36	54	48	36	54	60	~~17~~	~~6~~	29	48	26	60	43	28	1044
3	Valj Semerenko (UKR)	48	38	54	21	31	48	48	40	~~2~~	36	43	43	27	30	38	32	DNF	31	48	22	26	60	32	38	31	865
4	Veronika Vítková (CZE)	40	54	36	11	16	26	17	31	60	54	34	48	25	22	48	30	48	20	26	30	34	~~4~~	43	40	DNF	793
5	Franziska Hildebrand (GER)	38	32	31	40	34	20	28	36	~~15~~	30	38	27	38	43	54	0	34	15	31	38	31	38	19	30	32	757
6	Gabriela Soukalová (CZE)	0	12	20	~~10~~	23	60	21	43	38	31	28	32	18	20	21	40	32	40	23	40	54	40	31	31	54	752
7	Dorothea Wierer (ITA)	—	43	48	28	26	54	43	38	54	29	32	28	23	31	—	—	27	38	21	32	43	8	40	34	25	745
8	Laura Dahlmeier (GER)	—	—	—	—	—	32	40	32	—	—	1	—	48	28	60	48	43	54	43	54	38	36	54	54	60	725
9	Franziska Preuß (GER)	24	19	28	31	36	2	22	34	43	38	0	54	32	32	—	—	21	2	27	28	—	54	38	48	38	651
10	Karin Oberhofer (ITA)	13	34	30	54	38	31	34	28	34	32	0	24	40	34	—	—	6	26	11	1	24	48	36	25	40	643
11	Tiril Eckhoff (NOR)	36	60	38	48	—	18	—	—	28	48	48	18	20	17	11	21	5	34	22	23	0	25	18	24	36	598
12	Anaïs Bescond (FRA)	0	23	29	32	48	5	9	54	—	16	0	40	0	3	31	28	31	43	0	DNS	36	32	29	32	24	545
13	Ekaterina Glazyrina (RUS)	34	21	32	31	54	15	10	22	25	27	—	26	26	26	30	38	24	0	15	20	—	28	0	10	30	544
14	Weronika Nowakowska-Ziemniak (POL)	27	13	0	29	2	36	26	27	30	28	0	38	32	27	—	—	18	21	54	48	28	16	2	13	14	529
15	Marie Dorin Habert (FRA)	—	—	—	—	—	—	—	—	16	—	26	30	22	40	40	26	26	48	60	60	—	34	21	29	48	526
16	Daria Virolaynen (RUS)	14	0	10	0	6	6	32	26	24	34	22	34	30	54	8	DNS	DNS	31	20	25	40	18	16	20	29	499
17	Susan Dunklee (USA)	20	0	22	12	14	22	13	18	20	8	15	25	34	38	32	23	30	0	0	7	29	21	15	18	22	458
18	Nadezhda Skardino (BLR)	43	0	—	5	29	19	38	48	32	14	0	22	36	13	25	22	25	24	0	—	21	—	26	DNS	—	442
19	Jana Gereková (SVK)	18	2	0	6	18	13	24	—	22	40	0	6	43	36	9	25	28	31	29	27	0	29	10	0	12	428
20	Vanessa Hinz (GER)	2	0	2	38	27	28	30	30	36	25	20	21	—	—	29	43	0	14	0	4	0	—	25	22	16	412
21	Rosanna Crawford (CAN)	25	29	27	7	40	43	36	29	0	21	—	—	12	15	DNF	—	13	28	9	16	0	—	13	28	DNF	391
22	Teja Gregorin (SLO)	16	36	40	27	25	7	16	8	7	18	29	29	0	9	0	15	16	12	—	—	—	—	12	11	26	359
23	Elisa Gasparin (SUI)	6	16	0	0	21	16	15	—	12	—	0	—	21	23	3	24	20	0	28	26	19	12	30	14	27	333
24	Juliya Dzhyma (UKR)	26	0	—	23	32	0	7	14	—	—	—	—	11	21	23	36	38	22	—	—	3	—	22	27	23	328
25	Olga Podchufarova (RUS)	30	28	26	43	43	40	20	21	0	—	—	—	—	—	0	2	0	32	0	14	0	—	9	15	—	323
26	Lisa Theresa Hauser (AUT)	3	28	9	14	19	24	18	12	1	22	4	20	14	8	0	DNS	14	0	17	19	15	27	0	16	18	322
27	Ekaterina Shumilova (RUS)	8	0	16	8	24	0	0	—	19	20	12	—	16	25	1	9	—	0	38	43	—	31	5	21	—	296
28	Enora Latuillière (FRA)	28	31	6	21	15	21	23	13	27	2	19	2	24	29	5	DNF	0	18	—	—	0	—	0	1	DNF	278
29	Monika Hojnisz (POL)	0	0	—	3	30	14	6	—	26	10	24	—	8	19	—	—	40	36	0	—	32	—	—	—	—	248
30	Fanny Welle-Strand Horn (NOR)	0	17	13	36	22	1	3	20	9	4	60	14	10	16	0	5	0	8	0	—	0	—	1	7	—	246
#	Name	ÖST IN	ÖST SP	ÖST PU	HOC SP	HOC PU	POK SP	POK PU	POK MS	OBE SP	OBE MS	RUH SP	RUH MS	ANT SP	ANT PU	NOV SP	NOV PU	HOL IN	HOL SP	WCH SP	WCH PU	WCH IN	WCH MS	KHA SP	KHA PU	KHA MS	Total
31	Ekaterina Yurlova (RUS)	—	—	—	—	—	—	—	—	—	—	—	—	—	—	4	17	22	10	—	—	60	30	24	36	34	237
32	Marine Bolliet (FRA)	22	30	34	22	10	0	—	25	10	24	0	23	19	18	0	DNS	0	0	—	—	—	—	—	—	—	237
33	Eva Puskarčíková (CZE)	0	24	24	0	—	8	12	—	0	—	23	—	0	—	18	27	7	0	0	—	17	—	28	23	21	232
34	Luise Kummer (GER)	23	0	—	18	0	0	—	—	18	—	0	—	28	4	12	29	—	—	—	—	16	—	34	26	8	216
35	Nicole Gontier (ITA)	12	4	0	0	—	34	31	24	48	12	0	31	0	0	—	—	12	0	0	—	6	—	0	0	—	214
36	Mari Laukkanen (FIN)	—	0	0	19	1	30	0	—	40	6	40	8	0	5	21	4	DNS	—	25	11	0	—	3	0	—	213
37	Megan Heinicke (CAN)	29	0	—	0	—	0	27	—	0	—	30	16	1	12	DNS	—	29	0	18	13	20	14	—	—	—	209
38	Krystyna Guzik (POL)	15	9	0	0	—	0	19	—	3	—	0	—	0	—	15	19	0	0	40	34	27	24	—	—	—	205
39	Fuyuko Suzuki (JPN)	7	0	0	0	0	29	29	23	6	—	18	—	0	1	6	0	0	7	19	17	8	23	—	—	—	193
40	Olga Abramova (UKR)	4	15	0	0	0	3	5	—	0	—	17	—	0	6	26	14	0	0	32	31	—	6	11	8	—	178
41	Nadzeya Pisareva (BLR)	0	21	19	0	0	0	14	—	14	—	14	—	15	—	19	6	DNS	0	0	0	23	—	23	4	—	172
42	Elise Ringen (NOR)	0	0	18	0	0	—	—	—	29	23	27	12	0	—	14	12	19	0	0	3	9	—	0	0	—	166
43	Natalya Burdyga (UKR)	1	7	21	16	4	0	8	—	31	26	0	—	0	—	24	18	9	DNS	—	—	—	—	—	—	—	165
44	Yana Romanova (RUS)	19	6	25	26	20	0	0	16	DNS	—	6	—	0	14	—	—	—	11	—	—	10	—	DNS	—	—	153
45	Iryna Varvynets (UKR)	—	—	—	—	—	—	—	—	0	—	8	—	13	—	28	DNS	36	19	4	15	5	—	0	19	—	147
46	Marte Olsbu (NOR)	0	0	5	17	0	11	25	—	0	—	11	—	5	24	16	13	0	0	10	0	—	—	0	6	—	143
47	Magdalena Gwizdon (POL)	9	25	0	15	5	0	—	—	0	—	0	—	0	0	—	—	—	—	36	24	0	22	—	—	—	136
48	Jitka Landová (CZE)	21	18	23	0	—	0	2	—	0	—	31	10	0	DNS	0	7	0	0	0	—	0	—	0	17	—	129
49	Éva Tófalvi (ROU)	5	0	—	25	11	0	0	—	—	—	2	—	4	7	17	34	—	23	0	—	0	—	0	0	—	128
50	Nastassia Dubarezava (BLR)	11	0	7	9	9	0	0	—	0	—	5	—	0	10	0	DSQ	0	16	30	8	0	10	7	0	—	122
51	Justine Braisaz (FRA)	—	—	—	24	—	27	11	4	0	—	21	—	0	DNS	0	—	1	6	7	6	7	—	—	—	—	114
52	Katharina Innerhofer (AUT)	0	5	0	0	—	17	4	—	17	—	25	4	0	DNS	—	—	—	—	14	9	0	—	17	0	—	112
53	Hannah Dreissigacker (USA)	0	0	—	0	—	24	0	—	4	—	0	—	0	0	2	0	8	25	0	—	0	—	27	3	10	103
54	Andreja Mali (SLO)	0	10	17	0	0	0	—	—	0	—	0	—	0	0	0	—	0	0	34	21	0	20	0	DNS	—	102
55	Iryna Kryuko (BLR)	—	—	—	0	—	0	—	—	13	—	DNS	—	0	—	27	31	0	0	—	—	22	—	7	0	—	100
56	Sophie Boilley (FRA)	31	26	15	3	0	9	0	10	—	—	—	—	—	—	—	—	—	—	—	—	—	—	—	—	—	94
57	Coline Varcin (FRA)	0	22	1	0	0	0	—	—	—	—	—	—	—	—	34	20	DNS	0	0	DNS	0	—	—	—	—	77
58	Elisabeth Högberg (SWE)	32	0	0	3	17	0	0	—	8	—	14	—	0	—	—	—	0	0	0	0	0	—	—	—	—	74
59	Dunja Zdouc (AUT)	0	0	8	0	3	4	0	—	0	—	0	—	0	—	DNS	—	—	—	24	18	11	2	—	—	—	70
60	Aita Gasparin (SUI)	0	0	—	0	—	0	0	—	—	—	16	—	2	0	—	—	—	—	0	—	0	—	20	12	20	70
#	Name	ÖST IN	ÖST SP	ÖST PU	HOC SP	HOC PU	POK SP	POK PU	POK MS	OBE SP	OBE MS	RUH SP	RUH MS	ANT SP	ANT PU	NOV SP	NOV PU	HOL IN	HOL SP	WCH SP	WCH PU	WCH IN	WCH MS	KHA SP	KHA PU	KHA MS	Total
61	Lena Häcki (SUI)	—	—	—	0	—	0	—	—	11	—	0	—	29	2	—	—	—	—	13	5	0	—	—	—	—	60
62	Iana Bondar (UKR)	—	—	—	0	—	0	—	—	—	—	—	—	—	—	0	16	—	27	5	12	—	—	0	—	—	60
63	Mona Brorsson (SWE)	10	0	12	0	0	0	0	—	0	—	—	—	0	—	0	—	0	0	12	2	18	—	0	—	—	54
64	Federica Sanfilippo (ITA)	—	—	—	—	—	—	—	—	0	—	—	—	9	0	7	1	0	4	—	—	30	—	—	—	—	51
65	Kadri Lehtla (EST)	0	0	—	0	—	0	—	—	0	—	—	—	0	—	0	0	23	13	0	10	0	—	—	—	—	46
66	Lisa Vittozzi (ITA)	0	3	14	0	—	—	—	—	0	—	7	—	—	—	22	0	—	—	0	0	—	—	—	—	—	46
67	Darya Usanova (KAZ)	0	14	11	4	0	0	—	—	0	—	0	—	—	—	—	—	17	0	0	—	0	—	0	—	—	46
68	Barbora Tomešová (CZE)	—	—	—	—	—	0	0	—	0	—	—	—	DNS	—	0	11	10	1	—	—	—	—	14	0	—	36
69	Tang Jialin (CHN)	0	0	0	0	—	—	—	—	0	—	0	—	0	—	10	0	15	9	0	—	0	—	—	—	—	34
70	Irina Trusova (RUS)	—	—	—	—	—	—	—	—	—	—	9	—	7	11	0	—	4	—	—	—	—	—	—	—	—	31
71	Miriam Gössner (GER)	0	0	0	0	—	0	—	—	—	—	—	—	17	0	0	8	0	3	—	—	—	—	0	2	—	30
72	Annelies Cook (USA)	0	0	—	0	8	0	—	—	0	—	0	—	0	—	13	3	0	0	0	—	0	—	—	—	—	24
73	Karolin Horchler (GER)	17	0	—	0	0	—	—	—	0	—	—	—	—	—	—	—	—	—	—	—	—	—	0	5	—	22
74	Paulína Fialková (SVK)	0	0	—	13	7	0	—	—	0	—	0	—	—	—	0	0	2	DNS	0	—	0	—	0	—	—	22
75	Emilia Yordanova (BUL)	0	0	—	0	0	0	—	-	DNF	—	0	—	0	—	0	DNS	0	0	8	0	12	—	0	0	—	20
76	Synnøve Solemdal (NOR)	—	0	—	0	0	10	0	—	0	—	—	—	—	—	—	—	0	0	—	—	0	—	8	DNS	—	18
77	Terézia Poliaková (SVK)	0	0	0	0	13	0	—	—	0	—	0	—	0	0	—	—	—	0	0	0	4	—	0	0	—	17
78	Audrey Vaillancourt (CAN)	0	0	—	0	—	—	—	—	—	—	0	—	0	—	0	—	11	5	0	—	0	—	—	—	—	16
79	Desislava Stoyanova (BUL)	0	8	4	0	—	0	0	—	0	—	0	—	0	—	0	DNS	0	0	3	0	0	—	0	0	—	15
80	Yurie Tanaka (JPN)	0	0	—	0	—	0	—	—	0	—	0	—	0	—	0	—	0	0	0	—	14	—	—	—	—	14
81	Yuliya Zhuravok (UKR)	0	—	—	—	—	—	—	—	—	—	—	—	—	—	—	—	—	—	—	—	13	—	—	—	—	13
82	Luminita Piscoran (ROU)	0	1	0	0	12	0	—	—	0	—	0	—	0	—	0	0	0	0	0	0	0	—	0	0	—	13
83	Anna Kistanova (KAZ)	—	—	—	—	—	—	—	—	—	—	—	—	0	—	—	—	—	0	0	0	0	—	4	9	—	13
84	Kaia Wøien Nicolaisen (NOR)	0	—	—	—	—	12	0	—	DNS	—	—	—	—	—	—	—	—	—	—	—	—	—	0	—	—	12
85	Nadija Bjelkina (UKR)	—	11	0	0	—	0	—	—	—	—	0	—	—	—	—	—	—	—	—	—	—	—	—	—	—	11
86	Evgenia Seledtsova (RUS)	—	—	—	—	—	0	1	—	0	—	10	—	—	—	—	—	—	—	—	—	—	—	—	—	—	11
87	Tina Bachmann (GER)	—	—	—	—	—	—	—	—	0	—	0	—	—	—	0	10	—	—	—	—	—	—	—	—	—	10
88	Annika Knoll (GER)	—	—	—	—	—	—	—	—	—	—	—	—	6	—	—	—	—	—	—	—	—	—	0	0	—	6
89	Galina Nechkasova (RUS)	—	—	—	—	—	—	—	—	5	—	0	—	—	—	—	—	0	—	—	—	—	—	—	—	—	5
90	Martina Chrapánová (SVK)	—	—	—	—	—	—	—	—	0	—	0	—	3	0	0	0	DNS	0	0	0	0	—	—	—	—	3
#	Name	ÖST IN	ÖST SP	ÖST PU	HOC SP	HOC PU	POK SP	POK PU	POK MS	OBE SP	OBE MS	RUH SP	RUH MS	ANT SP	ANT PU	NOV SP	NOV PU	HOL IN	HOL SP	WCH SP	WCH PU	WCH IN	WCH MS	KHA SP	KHA PU	KHA MS	Total
91	Natalija Kocergina (LTU)	—	0	—	0	0	0	—	—	0	—	—	—	0	0	0	0	3	0	—	—	0	—	0	0	—	3
92	Olga Iakushova (RUS)	—	0	3	0	0	—	—	—	—	—	—	—	—	—	—	—	—	—	—	—	—	—	0	0	—	3
93	Emma Nilsson (SWE)	0	0	—	—	—	0	0	—	0	—	3	—	—	—	0	—	0	0	0	—	0	—	0	—	—	3
94	Johanna Talihärm (EST)	—	0	—	0	—	0	—	—	0	—	0	—	—	—	—	—	0	0	2	0	0	—	—	—	—	2
95	Gabriele Lescinskaite (LTU)	—	—	—	—	—	—	—	—	—	—	—	—	—	—	—	—	—	—	0	—	2	—	—	—	—	2
96	Clare Egan (USA)	—	—	—	—	—	—	—	—	—	—	—	—	—	—	0	—	0	0	1	0	0	—	—	—	—	1
97	Alina Raikova (KAZ)	—	—	—	—	—	—	—	—	—	—	0	—	—	—	—	—	0	—	0	—	1	—	—	—	—	1
