= Biathlon World Championships 2015 – Women's relay =

Women's relay at the Biathlon World Championships 2015
- Venue: Kontiolahti, Finland
- Date: 13 March 2015
- Competitors: 100 from 25 nations
- Winning time: 1:11:54.6

Medalists
gold medal	Franziska Hildebrand; Franziska Preuß; Vanessa Hinz; Laura Dahlmeier	Germany
silver medal	Anaïs Bescond; Enora Latuillière; Justine Braisaz; Marie Dorin Habert	France
bronze medal	Lisa Vittozzi; Karin Oberhofer; Nicole Gontier; Dorothea Wierer	Italy

The Women's relay event of the Biathlon World Championships 2015 was held on 13 March 2015.

== Results ==
The race started at 18:15 EET.

Rank	Bib	Team	Time	Penalties (P+S)	Deficit
1st place, gold medalist(s)	2	Germany; Franziska Hildebrand; Franziska Preuß; Vanessa Hinz; Laura Dahlmeier	1:11:54.6; 18:18.8; 18:04.9; 18:17.7; 17:13.2	0+1 0+5; 0+0 0+2; 0+1 0+2; 0+0 0+1; 0+0 0+0	
2nd place, silver medalist(s)	4	France; Anaïs Bescond; Enora Latuillière; Justine Braisaz; Marie Dorin Habert	1:12:54.9; 18:13.8; 18:24.3; 19:22.1; 16:54.7	1+6 0+3; 0+0 0+1; 0+1 0+1; 1+3 0+1; 0+2 0+0	+1:00.3
3rd place, bronze medalist(s)	5	Italy; Lisa Vittozzi; Karin Oberhofer; Nicole Gontier; Dorothea Wierer	1:13:00.7; 18:11.2; 18:03.2; 19:26.2; 17:20.1	0+3 0+6; 0+0 0+0; 0+1 0+3; 0+2 0+2; 0+0 0+1	+1:06.1
4	7	Norway; Marte Olsbu; Synnøve Solemdal; Fanny Welle-Strand Horn; Tiril Eckhoff	1:13:19.2; 18:20.0; 18:58.0; 18:46.4; 17.14.8	0+8 0+2; 0+2 0+0; 0+3 0+1; 0+1 0+1; 0+2 0+0	+1:24.6
5	6	Ukraine; Iryna Varvynets; Juliya Dzhyma; Olga Abramova; Valj Semerenko	1:13:37.1; 18:39.6; 18:17.8; 19:15.3; 17:24.4	0+3 1+6; 0+1 0+2; 0+0 0+1; 0+0 1+3; 0+2 0+0	+1:42.5
6	3	Belarus; Nadezhda Skardino; Nadzeya Pisarava; Iryna Kryuko; Darya Domracheva	1:14:00.4; 18:21.2; 19:05.0; 18:44.6; 17:49.6	0+2 1+6; 0+0 0+1; 0+1 1+3; 0+0 0+0; 0+1 0+2	+2:05.8
7	1	Czech Republic; Eva Puskarčíková; Gabriela Soukalová; Jitka Landová; Veronika Vítková	1:15:06.3; 18:32.7; 17:44.2; 19:58.1; 18.51.3	2+6 1+5; 0+0 0+2; 0+0 0+0; 0+3 1+3; 2+3 0+0	+3:11.7
8	13	Sweden; Elisabeth Högberg; Mona Brorsson; Anna Magnusson; Emma Nilsson	1:15:10.4; 18:50.3; 18.45.7; 19:17.1; 18:17.3	0+2 0+3; 0+1 0+1; 0+1 0+0; 0+0 0+2; 0+0 0+0	+3:15.8
9	10	Canada; Megan Heinicke; Rosanna Crawford; Audrey Vaillancourt; Julia Ransom	1:15:34.1; 18:40.1; 18:42.9; 19:03.7; 19:07.4	0+5 1+5; 0+1 0+0; 0+0 1+3; 0+2 0+0; 0+2 0+2	+3:39.5
10	11	Austria; Lisa Hauser; Dunja Zdouc; Simone Kupfner; Katharina Innerhofer	1:15:38.6; 18:20.5; 18:45.3; 20:04.6; 18.28.2	0+3 0+6; 0+0 0+2; 0+1 0+0; 0+1 0+2; 0+1 0+2	+3:44.0
11	21	United States; Susan Dunklee; Hannah Dreissigacker; Annelies Cook; Clare Egan	1:15:39.4; 18:10.0; 19:10.4; 19:26.4; 18:52.6	0+7 0+7; 0+2 0+0; 0+3 0+2; 0+2 0+2; 0+0 0+3	+3:44.8
12	9	Poland; Monika Hojnisz; Magdalena Gwizdoń; Weronika Nowakowska-Ziemniak; Krystyna Guzik	1:15:46.9; 18:06.3; 20:24.5; 18:54.1; 18:22.0	1+6 2+5; 0+0 0+0; 1+3 2+3; 0+1 0+2; 0+2 0+0	+3:52.3
13	15	Kazakhstan; Olga Poltoranina; Anna Kistanova; Darya Usanova; Alina Raikova	1:16:10.8; 18:45.8; 19:21.1; 19:27.1; 18:36.8	0+7 0+3; 0+1 0+0; 0+3 0+0; 0+3 0+2; 0+0 0+1	+4:16.2
14	16	Romania; Éva Tófalvi; Luminița Pișcoran; Réka Ferencz; Florina Ioana Cîrstea	1:16:24.4; 18:19.3; 18:36.5; 19:28.2; 20:00.4	0+2 0+3; 0+1 0+1; 0+0 0+1; 0+0 0+0; 0+1 0+1	+4:29.8
15	18	Estonia; Kadri Lehtla; Johanna Talihärm; Daria Yurlova; Kristel Viigipuu	1:16:38.2; 18:46.2; 18:52.1; 19:23.1; 19:36.8	0+4 0+2; 0+2 0+0; 0+1 0+0; 0+0 0+1; 0+1 0+1	+4:43.6
16	23	Finland; Sanna Markkanen; Mari Laukkanen; Eevamari Rauhamäki; Kaisa Mäkäräinen	1:17:00.8; 19:34.6; 18:49.6; 21:19.6; 17:17.0	2+5 0+4; 0+0 0+2; 0+2 0+0; 2+3 0+1; 0+0 0+1	+5:06.2
17	24	China; Tang Jialin; Zhang Yan; Song Chaoqing; Zhang Zhaohan	1:17:13.3; 19:02.8; 18:56.4; 19:50.5; 19:23.6	0+2 0+4; 0+2 0+1; 0+0 0+1; 0+0 0+0; 0+0 0+2	+5:18.7
18	14	Slovakia; Paulína Fialková; Jana Gereková; Terézia Poliaková; Martina Chrapánová	1:17:13.3; 19:53.9; 18:31.1; 19:10.1; 19:38.2	2+8 0+8; 1+3 0+3; 0+0 0+3; 0+2 0+1; 1+3 0+1	+5:18.7
19	25	Japan; Fuyuko Suzuki; Yurie Tanaka; Miki Kobayashi; Katsura Sato	LAP; 18:30.1; 19.57.0; 20:49.3	2+9 0+7; 0+0 0+2; 1+3 0+0; 1+3 0+2; 0+3 0+3	
20	17	Lithuania; Gabrielė Leščinskaitė; Diana Rasimovičiūtė; Natalija Kočergina; Natalija Paulauskaitė	LAP; 19:33.4; 20:07.6; 20:28.1	1+7 0+8; 0+0 0+2; 0+3 0+3; 1+3 0+2; 0+1 0+1	
21	12	Switzerland; Aita Gasparin; Elisa Gasparin; Lena Häcki; Flurina Volken	LAP; 20:04.0; 19:48.9; 20:41.2	4+9 0+8; 0+2 0+2; 1+3 0+2; 3+3 0+1; 0+1 0+3	
22	22	Slovenia; Andreja Mali; Teja Gregorin; Urška Poj; Anja Eržen	LAP; 19:03.3; 20:47.1; 20:28.7	0+6 1+9; 0+3 0+0; 0+1 1+3; 0+1 0+3; 0+1 0+3	
23	19	Bulgaria; Emilia Yordanova; Desislava Stoyanova; Stefani Popova; Daniela Kadeva	LAP; 19:00.7; 19:19.6; 20:28.8	1+7 0+6; 0+2 0+0; 0+2 0+2; 0+0 0+1; 1+3 0+3	
24	20	South Korea; Mun Ji-hee; Kim Seon-su; Ko Eun-jung; Kim Kyung-nam	LAP; 19:27.8; 21:23.3; 19:46.1	0+4 0+5; 0+2 0+0; 0+1 0+2; 0+1 0+0; 0+0 0+3	
DSQ	8	Russia; Ekaterina Glazyrina; Daria Virolaynen; Ekaterina Yurlova; Ekaterina Shumilova	1:13:11.4; 18:06.7; 18:39.4; 18:25.7; 17:59.6	0+2 0+5; 0+0 0+0; 0+0 0+3; 0+1 0+0; 0+1 0+2	+1:16.8
