= 2014–15 Biathlon World Cup – Sprint Women =

The 2014–15 Biathlon World Cup – Sprint Women started on Saturday December 6, 2014 in Östersund and finished on Friday March 20, 2015 in Khanty-Mansiysk. The defending titlist Kaisa Mäkäräinen of Finland finished on the 2nd place. Darya Domracheva of Belarus won the title.

== Competition format ==
The 7.5 kilometres (4.7 mi) sprint race is the third oldest biathlon event; the distance is skied over three laps. The biathlete shoots two times at any shooting lane, first prone, then standing, totalling 10 targets. For each missed target the biathlete has to complete a penalty lap of around 150 metres. Competitors' starts are staggered, normally by 30 seconds.

== 2013–14 Top 3 Standings ==
Medal	Athlete	Points
Gold:	(Finland) Kaisa Mäkäräinen	367
Silver:	(Norway) Tora Berger	361
Bronze:	(Belarus) Darya Domracheva	254

== Medal winners ==
Event:	Gold:	Time	Silver:	Time	Bronze:	Time
Östersund details	Tiril Eckhoff; Norway	21:35.5 (0+1)	Veronika Vítková; Czech Republic	21:40.1 (0+0)	Kaisa Mäkäräinen; Finland	21:43.1 (1+1)
Hochfilzen details	Kaisa Mäkäräinen; Finland	20:55.6 (1+0)	Karin Oberhofer; Italy	21:06.0 (0+0)	Tiril Eckhoff; Norway	21:25.5 (0+1)
Pokljuka details	Gabriela Soukalová; Czech Republic	20:17.3 (0+0)	Dorothea Wierer; Italy	20:35.7 (0+1)	Valj Semerenko; Ukraine	20:42.0 (0+0)
Oberhof details	Veronika Vítková; Czech Republic	22:40.0 (1+1)	Dorothea Wierer; Italy	22:48.8 (1+0)	Nicole Gontier; Italy	22:59.1 (0+0)
Ruhpolding details	Fanny Welle-Strand Horn; Norway	21:07.4 (0+0)	Darya Domracheva; Belarus	21:10.8 (0+0)	Tiril Eckhoff; Norway	21:16.7 (1+0)
Antholz details	Darya Domracheva; Belarus	19:57.8 (0+0)	Kaisa Mäkäräinen; Finland	20:24.7 (0+1)	Laura Dahlmeier; Germany	20:48.2 (0+0)
Nové Město details	Laura Dahlmeier; Germany	21:33.4 (0+0)	Franziska Hildebrand; Germany	21:34.4 (0+0)	Veronika Vítková; Czech Republic	21:47.3 (1+0)
Holmenkollen details	Darya Domracheva; Belarus	20:35.7 (0+0)	Laura Dahlmeier; Germany	20:50.5 (0+0)	Marie Dorin Habert; France	21:05.6 (0+1)
World Championships details	Marie Dorin Habert; France	22:16.8 (0+1)	Weronika Nowakowska-Ziemniak; Poland	22:26.4 (0+0)	Valj Semerenko; Ukraine	22:36.5 (0+1)
Khanty-Mansiysk details	Kaisa Mäkäräinen; Finland	19:49.1 (0+1)	Laura Dahlmeier; Germany	20:03.3 (0+1)	Darya Domracheva; Belarus	20:04.6 (1+1)

== Standings ==
#	Name	ÖST	HOC	POK	OBE	RUH	ANT	NOV	HOL	WCH	KHA	Total
1	Darya Domracheva (BLR)	40	34	38	23	54	60	43	60	16	48	416
2	Kaisa Mäkäräinen (FIN)	48	60	26	21	36	54	36	17	6	60	364
3	Veronika Vítková (CZE)	54	11	26	60	34	25	48	20	26	43	347
4	Dorothea Wierer (ITA)	43	28	54	54	32	23	—	38	21	40	333
5	Valj Semerenko (UKR)	38	21	48	2	43	27	38	31	48	32	328
6	Tiril Eckhoff (NOR)	60	48	18	28	48	20	11	34	22	18	307
7	Franziska Hildebrand (GER)	32	40	20	15	38	38	54	15	31	19	302
8	Laura Dahlmeier (GER)	—	—	32	—	1	48	60	54	43	54	292
9	Gabriela Soukalová (CZE)	12	10	60	38	28	18	21	40	23	31	281
10	Karin Oberhofer (ITA)	34	54	31	34	0	40	—	26	11	38	268
11	Marie Dorin Habert (FRA)	—	—	—	16	26	22	40	48	60	21	233
12	Weronika Nowakowska-Ziemniak (POL)	13	29	36	30	0	32	—	21	54	2	217
13	Franziska Preuß (GER)	19	31	2	43	0	32	—	2	27	36	192
14	Vanessa Hinz (GER)	0	38	28	36	20	—	29	14	0	25	190
15	Mari Laukkanen (FIN)	0	19	30	40	40	0	21	—	25	3	178
16	Nadezhda Skardino (BLR)	0	5	19	32	0	36	25	24	0	26	167
17	Enora Latuillière (FRA)	31	21	21	27	19	24	5	18	—	0	166
18	Jana Gereková (SVK)	2	6	13	22	0	43	9	31	29	10	165
19	Anaïs Bescond (FRA)	23	32	5	0	0	0	31	43	0	29	163
20	Ekaterina Glazyrina (RUS)	20	31	15	26	—	26	30	0	15	0	163
21	Daria Virolaynen (RUS)	0	0	6	24	22	30	8	31	20	16	157
22	Olga Podchufarova (RUS)	28	43	40	—	—	—	0	32	0	9	152
23	Susan Dunklee (USA)	0	12	22	20	15	34	32	0	0	15	150
24	Fanny Welle-Strand Horn (NOR)	17	36	1	9	60	10	0	8	0	1	142
25	Rosanna Crawford (CAN)	29	7	43	0	DNS	12	DNF	28	9	13	141
26	Teja Gregorin (SLO)	36	27	7	7	29	0	0	12	—	12	130
27	Elisa Gasparin (SUI)	16	0	16	12	0	21	3	0	28	30	126
28	Monika Hojnisz (POL)	0	3	14	26	24	8	—	36	0	—	111
29	Luise Kummer (GER)	0	18	0	18	0	28	12	—	—	34	110
30	Nadzeya Pisareva (BLR)	21	0	0	14	14	15	19	0	0	23	106
31	Olga Abramova (UKR)	15	0	3	0	17	0	29	0	32	11	104
32	Lisa Theresa Hauser (AUT)	28	14	24	1	4	14	0	0	17	0	102
33	Eva Puskarčíková (CZE)	24	0	8	0	23	0	18	0	0	28	101
34	Juliya Dzhyma (UKR)	0	23	0	—	—	11	23	22	—	22	101
35	Ekaterina Shumilova (RUS)	0	8	0	19	12	16	1	0	38	5	99
36	Katharina Innerhofer (AUT)	5	0	17	17	25	0	—	—	14	17	95
37	Nicole Gontier (ITA)	4	0	34	48	0	0	—	0	0	0	86
38	Justine Braisaz (FRA)	—	24	27	0	21	0	0	6	7	—	85
39	Fuyuko Suzuki (JPN)	0	0	29	6	18	0	6	7	19	—	85
40	Hannah Dreissigacker (USA)	0	0	24	4	0	0	2	25	0	27	82
41	Marine Bolliet (FRA)	30	22	0	10	0	19	—	0	—	—	81
42	Natalya Burdyga (UKR)	7	16	0	31	0	0	24	DNS	—	—	78
43	Magdalena Gwizdoń (POL)	25	15	0	0	0	0	—	—	36	—	76
44	Iryna Varvynets (UKR)	—	—	—	0	8	13	28	19	4	0	72
45	Éva Tófalvi (ROU)	0	25	0	—	2	4	17	23	0	0	71
46	Elise Ringen (NOR)	0	0	—	29	27	0	14	0	0	0	70
47	Marte Olsbu (NOR)	0	17	11	0	11	5	16	0	10	0	70
48	Krystyna Guzik (POL)	9	0	0	3	0	0	15	0	40	—	67
49	Nastassia Dubarezava (BLR)	0	9	0	0	5	0	0	16	30	7	67
50	Coline Varcin (FRA)	22	0	0	—	—	—	34	0	0	—	56
51	Lena Haecki (SUI)	—	0	0	11	0	29	—	—	13	—	53
52	Jitka Landová (CZE)	18	0	0	0	31	0	0	0	0	0	49
53	Megan Heinicke (CAN)	0	0	0	0	30	1	DNS	0	18	—	49
54	Yana Romanova (RUS)	6	26	0	DNS	6	0	—	11	—	DNS	49
55	Iryna Kryuko (BLR)	—	0	0	13	DNS	0	27	0	—	7	47
56	Andreja Mali (SLO)	10	0	0	0	0	0	0	0	34	0	44
57	Sophie Boilley (FRA)	26	3	9	—	—	—	—	—	—	—	38
58	Ekaterina Yurlova (RUS)	0	0	0	0	0	0	4	10	—	24	38
59	Aita Gasparin (SUI)	0	0	0	DNS	16	2	—	—	0	20	38
60	Lisa Vittozzi (ITA)	3	0	—	0	7	—	22	—	0	—	32
61	Iana Bondar (UKR)	—	0	0	—	—	—	0	27	5	0	32
62	Dunja Zdouc (AUT)	0	0	4	0	0	0	DNS	—	24	—	28
63	Elisabeth Högberg (SWE)	0	3	0	8	14	0	—	0	0	—	25
64	Miriam Gössner (GER)	0	0	0	—	—	17	0	3	—	0	20
65	Federica Sanfilippo (ITA)	—	—	—	0	—	9	7	4	—	—	20
66	Tang Jialin (CHN)	0	0	0	0	0	0	10	9	0	—	19
67	Darya Usanova (KAZ)	14	4	0	0	0	—	—	0	0	0	18
68	Synnøve Solemdal (NOR)	0	—	10	0	DNS	—	—	0	—	8	18
69	Irina Trusova (RUS)	—	—	—	—	9	7	0	—	—	—	16
70	Barbora Tomešová (CZE)	—	—	0	0	—	DNS	0	1	—	14	15
71	Kadri Lehtla (EST)	0	0	0	0	—-	0	—	13	0	—	13
71	Paulina Fialkova (SVK)	0	13	0	0	0	—	0	DNS	0	0	13
71	Annelies Cook (USA)	0	0	0	0	0	0	13	0	0	—	13
74	Kaia Wøien Nicolaisen (NOR)	—	—	12	DNS	—	—	—	—	—	0	12
74	Mona Brorsson (SWE)	—	—	0	0	—	0	0	0	12	0	12
76	Nadija Bjelkina (UKR)	11	0	0	—	0	—	—	—	—	—	11
77	Desislava Stoyanova (BUL)	8	0	0	0	0	0	0	0	3	0	11
78	Evgeniya Seledtsova (RUS)	—	—	0	0	10	0	—	—	—	—	10
79	Emilia Yordanova (BUL)	—	—	0	0	—	0	0	0	8	0	8
80	Annika Knoll (GER)	—	—	—	—	—	6	—	—	—	0	6
81	Galina Nechkasova (RUS)	—	—	—	5	0	—	—	—	—	—	5
81	Audrey Vaillancourt (CAN)	0	0	—	—	0	0	0	5	0	—	5
83	Anna Kistanova (KAZ)	—	—	—	—	—	0	—	0	0	4	4
84	Martina Chrapánová (SVK)	—	—	—	0	0	3	0	0	0	—	3
84	Emma Nilsson (SWE)	0	—	0	0	3	—	0	0	0	0	3
86	Johanna Talihaerm (EST)	—	—	0	0	—	0	0	0	2	—	2
87	Luminita Piscoran (ROU)	1	0	0	0	0	0	0	0	0	0	1
87	Clare Egan (USA)	—	—	0	0	—	0	0	0	1	—	1
