= 2014–15 Biathlon World Cup – Pursuit Women =

The 2014–15 Biathlon World Cup – Pursuit Women started on Sunday December 7, 2014 in Östersund and finished on Saturday March 21, 2015 in Khanty-Mansiysk. Kaisa Mäkäräinen of Finland successfully defended her title.

== Competition format ==
This is a pursuit competition. The biathletes' starts are separated by their time differences from a previous race, most commonly a sprint race. The contestants ski a distance of 10 kilometres (6.2 mi) over five laps. On four of the laps, the contestants shoot at targets; each miss requires the contestant to ski a penalty loop of 150 metres (490 ft). There are two prone shooting bouts and two standing bouts, in that order. The contestant crossing the finish line first is the winner.

To prevent awkward and/or dangerous crowding of the skiing loops, and overcapacity at the shooting range, World Cup Pursuits are held with only the 60 top ranking biathletes after the preceding race. The biathletes shoot (on a first-come, first-served basis) at the lane corresponding to the position they arrived for all shooting bouts.

Points are awarded for each event, according to each contestant's finish. When all events are completed. the contestant with the highest number of points is declared the season winner.

== 2013-14 Top 3 Standings ==
Medal	Athlete	Points
Gold:	(Finland) Kaisa Mäkäräinen	350
Silver:	(Norway) Tora Berger	319
Bronze:	(Belarus) Darya Domracheva	296

== Medal winners ==
Event	Gold	Time	Silver	Time	Bronze	Time
Östersund details	Kaisa Mäkäräinen; Finland	35:01.7 (1+1+0+1)	Valj Semerenko; Ukraine	35:49.6 (1+0+2+1)	Dorothea Wierer; Italy	35:50.0 (1+1+0+2)
Hochfilzen details	Kaisa Mäkäräinen; Finland	30:44.8 (0+0+1+0)	Anaïs Bescond; France	31:31.3 (0+0+1+0)	Olga Podchufarova; Russia	31:34.5 (1+0+1+0)
Pokljuka details	Darya Domracheva; Belarus	29:55.9 (0+0+0+1)	Kaisa Mäkäräinen; Finland	30:05.9 (0+1+0+0)	Valj Semerenko; Ukraine	30:32.7 (0+0+1+0)
Antholz details	Darya Domracheva; Belarus	30:58.5 (1+0+0+0)	Daria Virolaynen; Russia	32:19.5 (0+0+0+1)	Kaisa Mäkäräinen; Finland	32:27.5 (2+0+1+2)
Nové Město details	Darya Domracheva; Belarus	35:22.3 (2+0+1+1)	Kaisa Mäkäräinen; Finland	35:29.1 (2+0+1+1)	Laura Dahlmeier; Germany	35:37.2 (0+1+2+0)
World Championships details	Marie Dorin Habert; France	30:07.7 (0+0+2+1)	Laura Dahlmeier; Germany	30:23.0 (1+0+0+1)	Weronika Nowakowska-Ziemniak; Poland	30:39.3 (0+1+2+0)
Khanty-Mansiysk details	Darya Domracheva; Belarus	28:14.4 (0+1+0+0)	Laura Dahlmeier; Germany	28:30.1 (0+0+0+0)	Franziska Preuß; Germany	28:30.3 (0+0+0+0)

== Standings ==
#	Name	ÖST	HOC	POK	ANT	NOV	KON	KHA	Total
1	Darya Domracheva (BLR)	43	29	60	60	60	36	60	348
1	Kaisa Mäkäräinen (FIN)	60	60	54	48	54	29	43	348
3	Valj Semerenko (UKR)	54	32	48	30	34	22	38	258
4	Laura Dahlmeier (GER)	—	—	40	28	48	54	54	224
5	Dorothea Wierer (ITA)	48	27	43	31	—	32	34	215
6	Franziska Hildebrand (GER)	32	36	28	43	0	38	30	207
7	Gabriela Koukalová (CZE)	21	24	21	21	40	40	31	198
8	Franziska Preuß (GER)	29	38	22	32	—	28	48	197
9	Veronika Vítková (CZE)	36	17	17	23	31	30	40	194
10	Rosanna Crawford (CAN)	28	43	36	16	—	17	28	168
11	Karin Oberhofer (ITA)	31	40	34	34	—	2	25	166
12	Anaïs Bescond (FRA)	30	54	10	4	29	DNS	32	159
13	Marie Dorin Habert (FRA)	—	—	—	40	27	60	29	156
14	Daria Virolaynen (RUS)	11	7	32	54	DNS	25	20	149
15	Ekaterina Shumilova (RUS)	17	25	0	26	10	43	21	142
16	Susan Dunklee (USA)	23	15	13	38	24	8	18	139
17	Jana Gereková (SVK)	0	19	24	36	26	27	1	133
18	Vanessa Hinz (GER)	3	28	30	—	43	5	22	131
19	Yuliia Dzhima (UKR)	—	34	8	22	38	—	27	129
20	Olga Podchufarova (RUS)	27	48	20	—	3	15	15	128
21	Elisa Gasparin (SUI)	0	22	15	24	25	26	14	126
22	Tiril Eckhoff (NOR)	38	DNS	DNS	18	22	23	24	125
23	Teja Gregorin (SLO)	40	26	16	10	16	—	11	119
24	Weronika Nowakowska-Ziemniak (POL)	0	3	26	27	—	48	13	117
25	Nadezhda Skardino (BLR)	—	30	38	14	23	—	DNS	105
26	Lisa Theresa Hauser (AUT)	10	20	18	9	DNS	20	16	93
27	Eva Puskarčíková (CZE)	25	—	12	DNS	28	—	23	88
28	Enora Latuilliere (FRA)	7	16	23	29	DNF	—	2	77
29	Marte Olsbu Røiseland (NOR)	6	0	25	25	14	0	7	77
30	Krystyna Guzik (POL)	0	—	19	—	20	34	—	73
#	Name	ÖST	HOC	POK	ANT	NOV	KON	KHA	Total
31	Fanny Horn Birkeland (NOR)	14	23	4	17	6	—	8	72
32	Olga Abramova (UKR)	DNF	1	6	7	15	31	9	69
33	Marine Bolliet (FRA)	34	11	—	19	DNS	—	—	64
34	Yana Romanova (RUS)	26	21	0	15	—	—	—	62
35	Luise Kummer (GER)	—	0	DNS	5	30	—	26	61
36	Monika Hojnisz (POL)	—	31	7	20	—	—	—	58
37	Éva Tófalvi (ROU)	—	12	0	8	36	—	0	56
38	Natalya Burdyga (UKR)	22	5	9	DNS	19	—	—	55
39	Ekaterina Yurlova-Percht (RUS)	—	—	—	—	18	—	36	54
40	Megan Tandy (CAN)	—	—	27	13	—	14	—	54
41	Jitka Landová (CZE)	24	—	3	DNS	8	—	17	52
42	Fuyuko Tachizaki (JPN)	0	0	29	2	0	18	—	49
43	Nadzeya Pisareva (BLR)	20	0	14	DNS	7	0	5	46
44	Andreja Mali (SLO)	18	0	—	0	—	21	DNS	39
45	Natassia Dubarezava (BLR)	8	10	0	11	DSQ	9	0	38
46	Elise Ringen (NOR)	19	0	—	—	13	4	0	36
47	Iryna Petrenko (UKR)	—	—	—	DNF	DNS	16	19	35
48	Iryna Kryuko (BLR)	—	—	—	DNS	32	—	0	32
49	Dunja Zdouc (AUT)	9	4	0	—	—	19	—	32
50	Nicole Gontier (ITA)	0	—	31	0	—	—	0	31
51	Magdalena Gwizdoń (POL)	0	6	—	0	—	24	—	30
52	Iana Bondar (UKR)	—	—	—	—	17	13	—	30
53	Mari Eder (FIN)	0	2	0	6	5	12	0	25
54	Coline Varcin (FRA)	2	0	—	—	21	DNS	—	23
55	Elisabeth Högberg (SWE)	0	18	—	—	—	0	—	18
56	Justine Braisaz (FRA)	—	DNS	11	DNS	—	7	—	18
57	Sophie Boilley (FRA)	16	0	0	—	—	—	—	16
58	Lisa Vittozzi (ITA)	15	DNS	—	—	0	1	—	16
59	Mona Brorsson (SWE)	13	0	0	—	—	3	—	16
60	Katharina Innerhofer (AUT)	0	—	5	DNS	—	10	0	15
#	Name	ÖST	HOC	POK	ANT	NOV	KON	KHA	Total
61	Terézia Poliaková (SVK)	0	14	—	0	—	0	0	14
62	Aita Gasparin (SUI)	—	—	1	1	—	—	12	14
63	Luminita Piscoran (ROU)	0	13	—	—	0	0	0	13
64	Annelies Cook (USA)	—	9	—	—	4	—	—	13
65	Barbora Tomesova (CZE)	—	—	0	—	12	—	0	12
66	Darya Usanova (KAZ)	12	0	—	—	—	—	—	12
67	Irina Uslugina (RUS)	—	—	—	12	—	—	—	12
68	Miriam Gössner (GER)	0	—	—	0	9	—	3	12
69	Tina Bachmann (GER)	—	—	—	—	11	—	—	11
69	Kadri Lehtla (EST)	—	—	—	—	—	11	—	11
71	Anna Kistanova (KAZ)	—	—	—	—	—	0	10	10
72	Lena Häcki (SUI)	—	—	0	3	—	6	—	9
73	Paulína Fialková (SVK)	—	8	—	—	0	—	—	8
74	Karolin Horchler (GER)	DNS	0	—	—	—	—	6	6
75	Desislava Stoyanova (BUL)	5	—	0	—	DNS	0	0	5
76	Hannah Dreissigacker (USA)	—	—	0	0	1	—	4	5
77	Olga Iakushova (RUS)	4	0	—	—	—	—	0	4
78	Federica Sanfilippo (ITA)	—	—	—	0	2	—	—	2
79	Evgenia Seledtsova (RUS)	—	—	2	—	—	—	—	2
80	Galina Vishnevskaya (KAZ)	1	—	0	—	—	—	—	1
