= Yang Shuai =

Yang Shuai may refer to:

- Yang Shuai (footballer)
- Yang Shuai (speed skater)
