= 2017 Winter Military World Games =

Sports competition

III Winter Military World Games
- Host city: Sochi, Russia
- Nations: 25
- Events: 44 in 7 sports
- Opening: 23 February 2017
- Closing: 27 February 2017
- Opened by: Prime Minister Dmitry Medvedev
- Athlete's Oath: Natalya Korostelyova (sportsmen); Mikhail Kazadoy (coaches)
- Judge's Oath: Alexander Tomashchuk
- Torch lighter: Svetlana Ishmuratova; Anatoly Alyabyev
- Main venue: see below

Winter

Summer

The 3rd CISM World Winter Games (Russian: Зимние Всемирные военные игры 2017) were held in Sochi, Russia from 23 to 27 February 2017.

== Host selection and venues ==
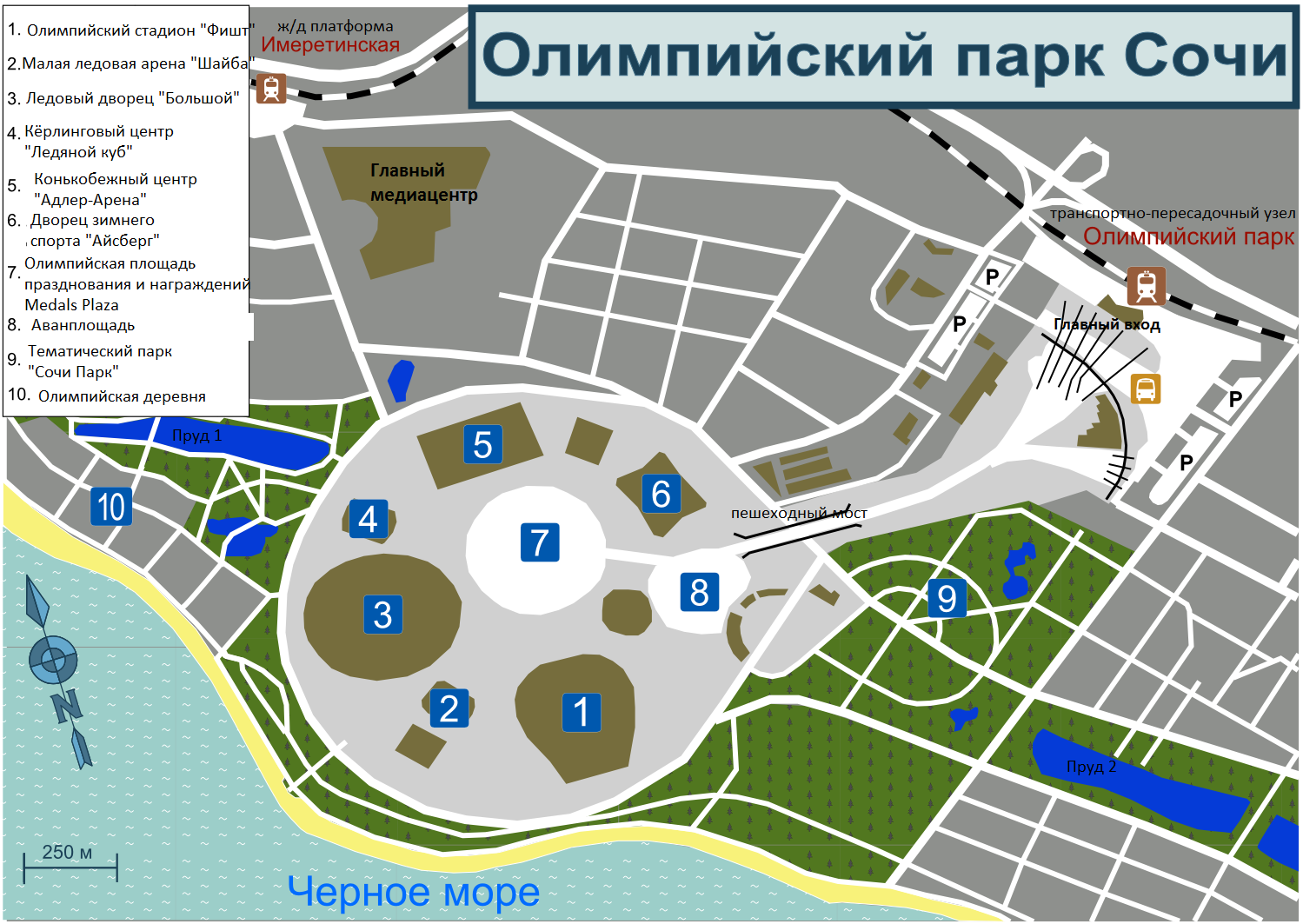
The sports complex of the Sochi Olympic Park

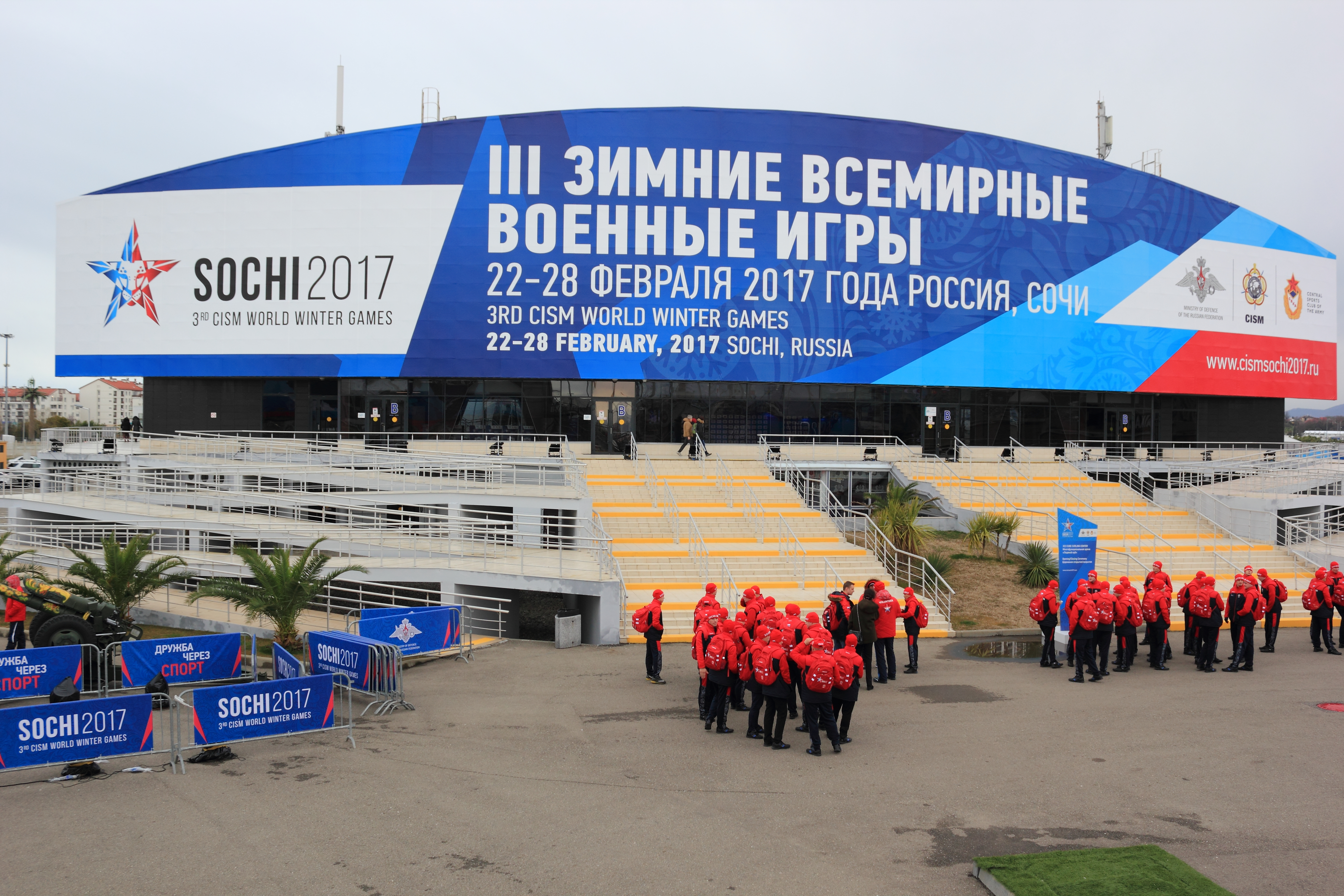
The multi-functional Ice Cube arena, where the opening and closing ceremonies were held

Sochi was chosen as the host city for the 3rd Winter Military Games at the 70th general assembly of the International Military Sports Council in Kuwait City, Kuwait in 2015. The Games were held in sports venues built for the 2014 Winter Olympic Games.

The sports complex is composed of two clusters: the Coastal Cluster, i.e. the Olympic Park, and the Mountain Cluster, i.e. the Krasnaya Polyana.

The following venues built for the Olympic Games were used for the Military Games:

| Venue | Area | Sports | Capacity |
|---|---|---|---|
| Ice Cube Curling Center | Olympic Park | Opening and closing ceremony | 3000 |
| Bolshoy Ice Dome | Olympic Park | Sport climbing | 12000 |
| Iceberg Skating Palace | Olympic Park | Short track | 12000 |
| Laura Biathlon & Ski Complex | Krasnaya Polyana | Biathlon; Cross-country skiing Ski orienteering | 7500 |
| Rosa Khutor Alpine Resort | Krasnaya Polyana | Alpine skiing Ski mountaineering | 7500 |

== Mascots and brand style ==
The official mascot for the 3rd Winter Games was the Leopard. According to the official website of the Games, it was chosen "due to the fact that the endurance of this animal and his fighting spirit characterize the spirit of war games. The leopard symbolizes the swiftness of the attack and the speed of decision-making, as well as power and strength [...] In the heraldic traditions, a leopard is a symbol of bravery and courage – the qualities traditionally characterizing soldiers." Other mascots include the Hare and the Little Fox.

The brand style for the Games is a blue-red star with a head of a leopard on it. The colour red symbolizes "sport passion and will to win" and blue "infinite opportunities and devotion to reach the goal". The colours of the star and the leopard forms the Russian flag. Also, ice patterns and mountains occur on the brand.

== Schedule ==
| OC | Opening ceremony | 1 | Event finals | CC | Closing ceremony | ● | Event competitions | EG | Exhibition gala |

| February | 24 Fri | 25 Sat | 26 Sun | 27 Mon | Medals |
|---|---|---|---|---|---|
| Ceremonies | OC | | | CC | |
| Biathlon | 4 | 1 | | 2 | 7 |
| Alpine skiing | | 2 | 2 | | 4 |
| Cross-country skiing | 4 | | 2 | | 6 |
| Short track | 2 | 2 | 1 | | 5 |
| Sport climbing | ● | 4 | 2 | 2 | 8 |
| Ski orienteering | | 2 | 2 | 4 | 8 |
| Ski mountaineering | 2 | | | 4 | 6 |
| Medals | 12 | 11 | 9 | 12 | 44 |
| February | 24 Fri | 25 Sat | 26 Sun | 27 Mon | Medals |

== Participating nations ==
Overall, athletes from 25 countries participated.

- Armenia (1)
- Austria (22)
- Belarus (3)
- Belgium (6)
- Bosnia and Herzegovina (5)
- Bulgaria (19)
- China (43)
- Finland (16)
- France (42)
- Germany (35)
- Greece (3)
- Iran (4)
- Spain (14)
- Italy (26)
- Kazakhstan (24)
- Lebanon (9)
- Macedonia (11)
- Mongolia (2)
- Pakistan (4)
- Russia (60)
- Serbia (9)
- Slovenia (14)
- South Korea (11)
- Switzerland (21)
- Turkey (?)

== Medal winners ==
=== Alpine skiing ===
==== Men ====
| Event | Gold | | Silver | | Bronze | |
|---|---|---|---|---|---|---|
| Slalom | Stefano Gross; Italy | 1:30.82 | Manfred Moelgg; Italy | 1:31.01 | Cristian Deville; Italy | 1:31.42 |
| Team slalom | Italy; Manfred Moelgg; Stefano Gross; Cristian Deville | 4:33.25 | Germany; Hansi Schwaiger; Fabian Gratz; Carlo Dorn | 4:47.50 | Iran; Nima Baha; Behnam Kiashemshaki; Pouria Saveh-Shemshaki | 5:03.93 |

==== Women ====
| Event | Gold | | Silver | | Bronze | |
|---|---|---|---|---|---|---|
| Slalom | Irene Curtoni; Italy | 1:38.51 | Maria Shkanova; Belarus | 1:38.93 | Laurie Mougel; France | 1:38.97 |
| Team slalom | Italy | | Russia | | China | |

=== Biathlon ===
==== Men ====
| Event | Gold | | Silver | | Bronze | |
|---|---|---|---|---|---|---|
| 10 km sprint | Maxim Tsvetkov; Russia | 27:01.3 (0+1) | Vladimir Iliev; Bulgaria | 27:15.2 (0+3) | Krasimir Anev; Bulgaria | 27:16.2 (0+1) |
| 10 km team sprint | Russia; Maxim Tsvetkov; Matvey Eliseev; Sergey Klyachin | 1:24:10.2 | Austria; David Komatz; Peter Brunner; Kevin Plessniter | 1:24:55.4 | Italy; Thierry Chenal; Riccardo Romani; Maikol Demetz | 1:27:30.4 |
| 20 km patrol race | Russia; Alexey Kornev; Matvey Eliseev; Sergey Klyachin; Eduard Latypov | 52:13.1 (0+0+0) | France; Clement Arnaud; Baptiste Jouty; Antonin Guigonnat; Damien Tarantola | 52:34.4 (1+1+1) | Austria; Klaus Leitinger; David Komatz; Peter Brunner; Kevin Plessniter | 52:39.8 (1+1+0) |

==== Women ====
| Event | Gold | | Silver | | Bronze | |
|---|---|---|---|---|---|---|
| 7,5 km sprint | Teja Gregorin; Slovenia | 22:19.5 (0+0) | Tatiana Akimova; Russia | 23:03.3 (0+0) | Uliana Kaisheva; Russia | 23:34.8 (1+0) |
| 7,5 km team sprint | Russia; Tatiana Akimova; Uliana Kaisheva; Galina Nechkasova | 1:10:38.2 | France; Enora Latuilliere; Coline Varcin; Estelle Mougel | 1:14:25.1 | China; Chu Yuanmeng; Zhaohan Zhang; Xuelan Wang | 1:18:49.3 |
| 15 km patrol race | France; Coline Varcin; Estelle Mougel; Enora Latuilliere; Coraline Thomas Hugue | 45:23.0 (0+0+0) | Russia; Galina Nechkasova; Anastasia Zagoruiko; Uliana Kaisheva; Lidia Durkina | 47:14.3 (2+1+0) | China; Xue Lan Wang; Chu Yuanmeng; Zhao Han Zhang; Shuang Chen | 51:51.5 (1+2+3) |

==== Mixed ====
| Event | Gold | | Silver | | Bronze | |
|---|---|---|---|---|---|---|
| Mixed relay | Austria; Dunja Zdouc; Katharina Innerhofer; Peter Brunner; David Komatz | 1:19:51.7 (0+0) (0+1) (0+1) (0+1) (0+0) (2+3) (0+0) (0+2) | France; Coline Varcin; Enora Latuilliere; Baptiste Jouty; Antonin Guigonnat | 1:19:54.9 (0+0) (0+0) (0+0) (0+1) (1+3) (0+3) (0+1) (0+3) | Russia; Uliana Kaisheva; Galina Nechkasova; Matvey Eliseev; Maxim Tsvetkov | 1:22:51.1 (0+1) (0+1) (1+3) (2+3) (0+2) (0+1) (0+0) (2+3) |

=== Cross-country skiing ===
==== Men ====
| Event | Gold | | Silver | | Bronze | |
|---|---|---|---|---|---|---|
| 15 km free style | Aleksey Chervotkin; Russia | 34:41.2 | Damien Tarantola; France | 34:52.2 | Paul Goalabre; France | 35:08.5 |
| 15 km free style team | France; Damien Tarantola; Paul Goalabre; Clement Arnault | 1:45:39.1 | Russia; Aleksey Chervotkin; Denis Spitsov; Artem Maltsev | 1:45:40.8 | Finland; Kusti Kittilae; Juho Mikkonen; Teemu Harkonen | 1:48:12.5 |
| Team sprint | Russia; Artem Maltsev; Nikolay Morilov | 20:36:70 | France; Clement Arnault; Paul Goalabre | 20:36:80 | Finland; Kusti Kittilae; Juho Mikkonen | 20:37:02 |

==== Women ====
| Event | Gold | | Silver | | Bronze | |
|---|---|---|---|---|---|---|
| 10 km free style | Theresa Eichhorn; Germany | 27:28.8 | Coraline Hugue; France | 27:43.9 | Francesca Baudin; Italy | 27:46.0 |
| 10 km free style team | Russia; Natalia Korosteleva; Lidia Durkina; Natalja Iljina | 1:25:21.5 | —N/a | | | |
| Team sprint | Russia; Natalja Iljina; Natalia Korosteleva | 22:11:36 | Switzerland; Alina Meier; Fabiana Wieser | 22:23:98 | Italy; Chiara De Zolt Ponte; Francesca Baudin | 22:33:41 |

=== Short track ===
==== Men ====
| Event | Gold | | Silver | | Bronze | |
|---|---|---|---|---|---|---|
| 500 m | Xu Hongzhi; China | 42.065 | Yang Shuai; China | 42.075 | Denis Ayrapetyan; Russia | 42.368 |
| 1000 m | Jin Kim Sun; South Korea | 1:25.574 | Yuri Confortola; Italy | 1:26.861 | Xu Hongzhi; China | 1:29.004 |

==== Women ====
| Event | Gold | | Silver | | Bronze | |
|---|---|---|---|---|---|---|
| 500 m | Arianna Fontana; Italy | 43.989 | Yang Yang; China | 44.061 | Eugenia Zakharova; Russia | 44.139 |
| 1000 m | Arianna Fontana; Italy | 1:31.884 | Yang Yang; China | 1:31.943 | Wang Runyuan; China | 1:32.234 |

==== Mixed ====
The teams in the mixed event were made up of sportsmen representing different countries, in accordance to the International Skating Union rules.

| Event | Gold | | Silver | | Bronze | |
|---|---|---|---|---|---|---|
| 3000 m | (Italy) Arianna Fontana (Italy) Elena Viviani (South Korea) Jae Min Hwang (Russia) Daniil Eybog | 4:05,281 | (Russia) Eugenia Zakharova (Russia) Ekaterina Konstantinova (Italy) Yuri Confortola (Italy) Nicola Rodigari | 4:05,913 | (China) Wang Runyuan (China) Wu Yi (China) Yang Shuai (China) Ning Qipeng | 4:06,570 |

=== Ski mountaineering ===
==== Men ====
| Event | Gold | | Silver | | Bronze | |
|---|---|---|---|---|---|---|
| Individual | Alexis Sevennec; France | 0:53.38 | Manfred Reichegger; Italy | 0:55.23 | Miguel Caballero Ortega; Spain | 0:56.06 |
| Team | Italy; Manfred Reichegger; Daniel Antonioli; Richard Tiraboschi | 2:51:25 | France; Alexis Sevennec; Bastien Fleury; Franck Asserquft | 2:53:26 | Spain; Miguel Caballero Ortega; Luis Alberto Hernando Alzaga; Francisco Javier Navarro Jimenez | 2:57:23 |
| Team race | Spain; Miguel Caballero Ortega; Luis Alberto Hernando Alzaga | 1:56:09 | France; Bastien Fleury; Alexis Sevennec | 1:56:17 | Italy; Manfred Reichegger; Daniel Antonioli | 1:57:24 |

==== Women ====
| Event | Gold | | Silver | | Bronze | |
|---|---|---|---|---|---|---|
| Individual | Adèle Milloz; France | 1:09.01 | Gloriana Pellissier; Italy | 1:12.18 | Nathalie Mieuzet; France | 1:14.48 |
| Team | Russia; Ekaterina Mitiaeva; Svetlana Berezan; Ekaterina Burlakova | 4:11:44 | —N/a | | | |
| Team race | France; Letizia Roux; Adèle Milloz | 2:28:09 | Russia; Ekaterina Mitiaeva; Svetlana Berezan | 2:53:29 | —N/a | |

=== Ski orienteering ===
==== Men ====
| Event | Gold | | Silver | | Bronze | |
|---|---|---|---|---|---|---|
| Middle | Eduard Khrennikov; Russia | 00:39.22 | Stanimir Belomazhev; Bulgaria | 00:42.20 | Stepan Malinovskii; Russia | 00:43.03 |
| Sprint | Eduard Khrennikov; Russia | 00:17.15 | Stanimir Belomazhev; Bulgaria | 00:17.57 | Vladimir Ignatov; Russia | 00:19.29 |
| Relay | Russia; Stepan Malinovskii; Andrei Lamov; Eduard Khrennikov | 1:05:52 | France; Rudy Gouy; Yann Debayle; Baptiste Fuchs | 1:12:30 | Switzerland; Sven Stefan Aschwanden; Tobias Michael Lutz; Andring Kappenberger | 1:14:27 |
| Team sprint (middle+sprint) | Russia; Eduard Khrennikov; Stepan Malinovskii; Eduard Khrennikov; Vladimir Ignatov | 1:59:09 | Finland; Eevert Toivonen; Sampo Hyppoelae; Eevert Toivonen; Sampo Hyppoelae | 2:14:06 | France; Yann Debayle; Baptiste Fuchs; Rudy Gouy; Baptiste Fuchs | 2:20:38 |

==== Women ====
| Event | Gold | | Silver | | Bronze | |
|---|---|---|---|---|---|---|
| Middle | Maria Kechkina; Russia | 00:35.33 | Tatiana Oborina; Russia | 00:38.44 | Antoniya Grigorova; Bulgaria | 00:39.28 |
| Sprint | Tatiana Oborina; Russia | 00:17.54 | Maria Kechkina; Russia | 00:18.11 | Anastasia Kravchenko; Russia | 00:18.55 |
| Relay | Russia; Tatiana Oborina; Anastasia Kravchenko; Maria Kechkina | 56:55 | France; Lou Denaix; Gaelle Barlet; Elodie Bourgeois-Pin | 1:09:51 | Kazakhstan; Asem Nazyrova; Elmira Moldasheva; Olga Novikova | 1:11:35 |
| Team sprint (middle+sprint) | Russia; Maria Kechkina; Tatiana Oborina; Tatiana Oborina; Maria Kechkina | 1:50:22 | Kazakhstan; Olga Novikova; Asem Nazyrova; Olga Novikova; Asem Nazyrova | 2:08:15 | France; Elodie Bourgeois-Pin; Gaelle Barlet; Gaelle Barlet; Lou Denaix | 2:25:00 |

=== Sport climbing ===
==== Men ====
| Event | Gold | | Silver | | Bronze | |
|---|---|---|---|---|---|---|
| Lead | Jakob Schubert; Austria | TOP 1:09 | Domen Škofic; Slovenia | TOP 1:21 | Marcello Bombardi; Italy | TOP 1:13 |
| Bouldering | Vadim Timonov; Russia | | Manuel Cornu; France | | Domen Škofic; Slovenia | |
| Speed classic | Sergei Luzhetskii; Russia | 0:31.22 (F) | Jakob Schubert; Austria | 0:39.28 (F) | Vadim Timonov; Russia | 0:38.27 (F) |
| Speed record | Sergei Luzhetskii; Russia | 0:06.36 (F) | Leonardo Gontero; Italy | 0:06.37 (F) | Vadim Timonov; Russia | 0:06.53 (F) |

==== Women ====
| Event | Gold | | Silver | | Bronze | |
|---|---|---|---|---|---|---|
| Lead | Jessica Pilz; Austria | TOP 1:41 | Katharina Posch; Austria | TOP 1:44 | Mina Markovič; Slovenia | TOP 2:22 |
| Bouldering | Jessica Pilz; Austria | | Olga Yakovleva; Russia | | Mina Markovič; Slovenia | |
| Speed classic | Anna Tsyganova; Russia | 0:49.36 (F) | Jessica Pilz; Austria | 0:52.35 (F) | Evgeniya Lapshina; Russia | 0:53.49 (F) |
| Speed record | Anna Tsyganova; Russia | 0:08.21 (F) | Aurélia Sarisson; France | 0:12.16 (F) | Daria Kan; Russia | 0:08.51 (F) |

== Medal table ==
The host countries are highlighted in lavender blue.

| Rank | Nation | Gold | Silver | Bronze | Total |
|---|---|---|---|---|---|
| 1 | Russia* | 22 | 9 | 11 | 42 |
| 2 | Italy | 8 | 6 | 6 | 20 |
| 3 | France | 6 | 12 | 5 | 23 |
| 4 | Austria | 4 | 4 | 1 | 9 |
| 5 | South Korea | 2 | 0 | 0 | 2 |
| 6 | China | 1 | 3 | 6 | 10 |
| 7 | Slovenia | 1 | 1 | 3 | 5 |
| 8 | Germany | 1 | 1 | 0 | 2 |
| 9 | Spain | 1 | 0 | 2 | 3 |
| 10 | Bulgaria | 0 | 3 | 2 | 5 |
| 11 | Finland | 0 | 1 | 2 | 3 |
| 12 | Kazakhstan | 0 | 1 | 1 | 2 |
| 12 | Switzerland | 0 | 1 | 1 | 2 |
| 14 | Belarus | 0 | 1 | 0 | 1 |
| 15 | Iran | 0 | 0 | 1 | 1 |
| Totals (15 entries) | | 46 | 43 | 41 | 130 |
