= Natalija Paulauskaitė =

Lithuanian biathlete (born 1991)

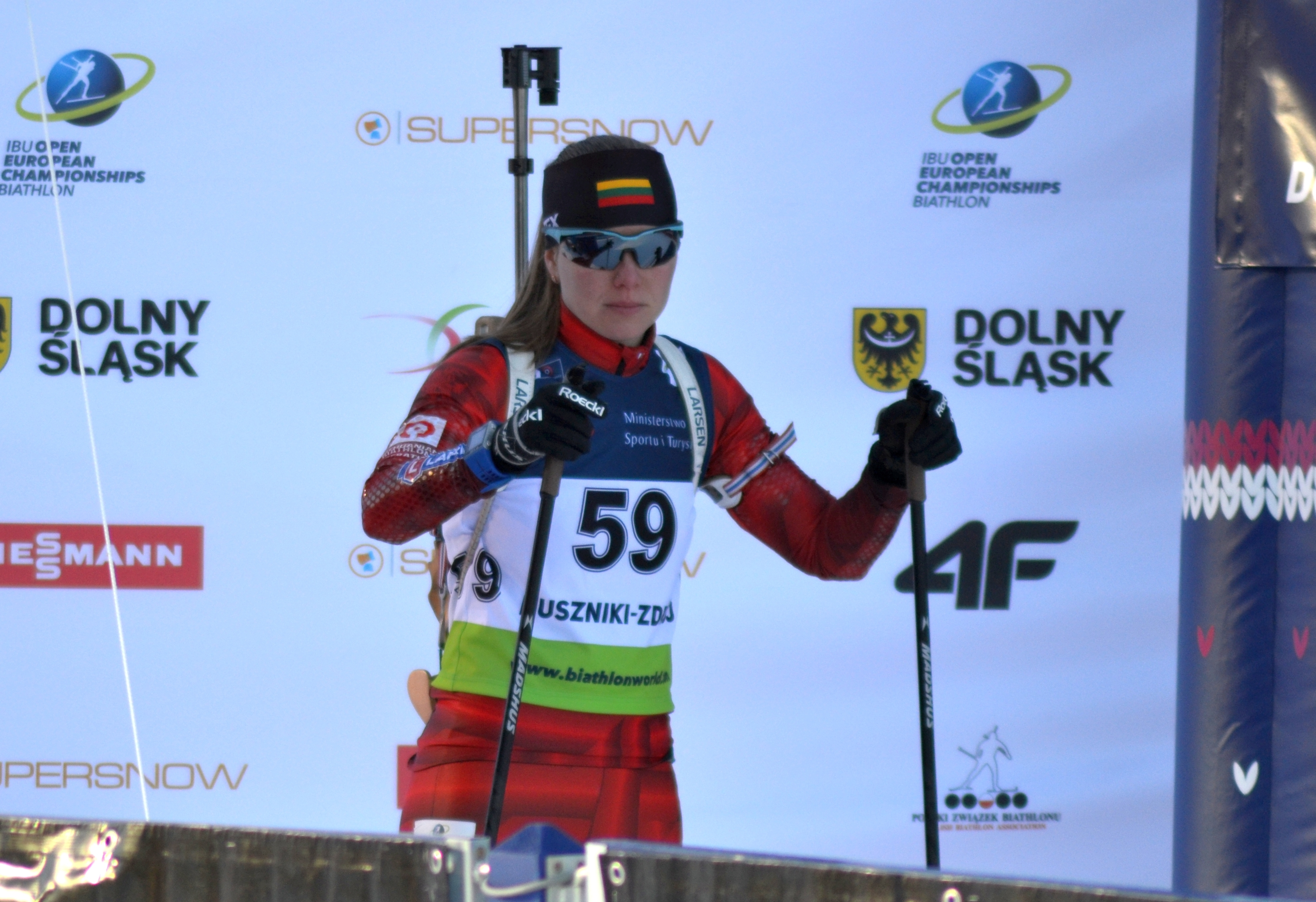
- Paulauskaitė at the European Championships 2017

Personal information
- Nationality: Lithuanian
- Born: 27 September 1991 (age 33)

Sport
- Country: Lithuania
- Sport: Biathlon

Natalija Paulauskaitė (born 27 September 1991) is a Lithuanian biathlete. She competed in the 2014/15 World Cup seasons, and represented Lithuania at the Biathlon World Championships 2015 in Kontiolahti.
