= Katsura Sato =

Japanese biathlete (born 1989)

Personal information
- Nationality: Japanese
- Born: 11 March 1989 (age 36)

Sport
- Country: Japan
- Sport: Biathlon

Katsura Sato (佐藤 桂, Satō Katsura, born 11 March 1989) is a Japanese biathlete. She represented Japan at the Biathlon World Championships 2015 in Kontiolahti.
