= 2014–15 Biathlon World Cup – World Cup 7 =

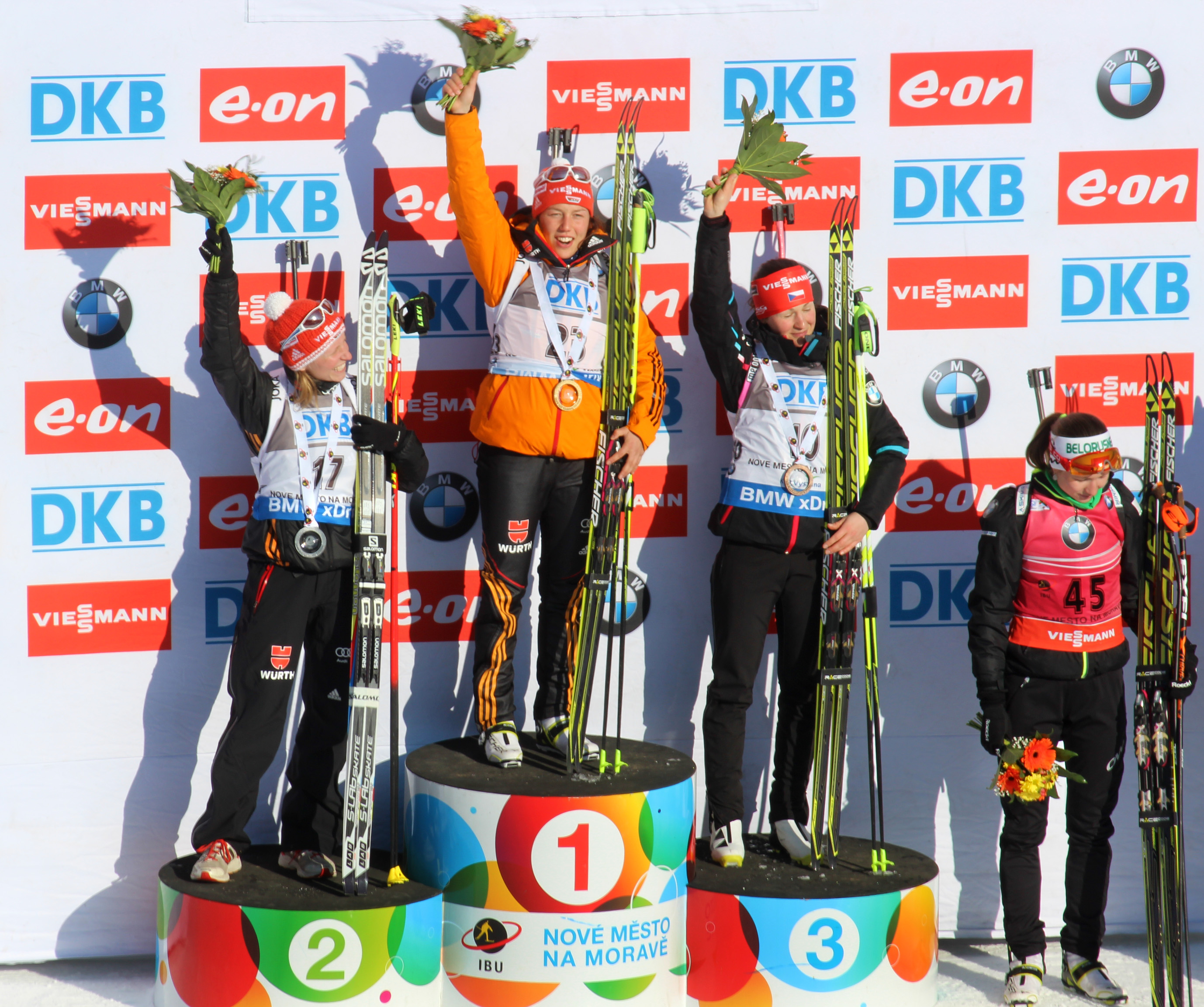
Podium after women sprint

The 2014–15 Biathlon World Cup – World Cup 7 was held in Nové Město, Czech Republic, from 6 February until 8 February 2015.

== Schedule of events ==
Date	Time	Events
February 6	15:10 CET	Single Mixed Relay
February 6	17:30 CET	Mixed 2 x 6 km + 2 x 7.5 km Relay
February 7	12:30 CET	Women's 7.5 km Sprint
February 7	15:30 CET	Men's 10 km Sprint
February 8	13:00 CET	Women's 10 km Pursuit
February 8	15:00 CET	Men's 12.5 km Pursuit

== Medal winners ==
=== Men ===
Event:	Gold:	Time	Silver:	Time	Bronze:	Time
10 km Sprint details	Jakov Fak; Slovenia	24:09.9 (0+0)	Simon Schempp; Germany	24:22.7 (0+0)	Jean-Guillaume Béatrix; France	24:35.9 (0+0)
12.5 km Pursuit details	Jakov Fak; Slovenia	37:24.9 (0+0+0+1)	Simon Schempp; Germany	37:29.3 (0+1+0+0)	Martin Fourcade; France	37:38.2 (0+0+0+0)

=== Women ===
Event:	Gold:	Time	Silver:	Time	Bronze:	Time
7.5 km Sprint details	Laura Dahlmeier; Germany	21:33.4 (0+0)	Franziska Hildebrand; Germany	21:34.4 (0+0)	Veronika Vítková; Czech Republic	21:47.3 (1+0)
10 km Pursuit details	Darya Domracheva; Belarus	35:22.3 (2+0+1+1)	Kaisa Mäkäräinen; Finland	35:29.1 (2+0+1+1)	Laura Dahlmeier; Germany	35:37.2 (0+1+2+0)

=== Mixed ===
Event:	Gold:	Time	Silver:	Time	Bronze:	Time
Single Mixed Relay details	Russia; Yana Romanova; Alexey Volkov	35:43.3 (0+0) (0+0) (0+2) (0+1) (0+0) (0+0) (0+2) (0+0)	Norway; Marte Olsbu; Henrik L'Abée-Lund	36:04.8 (0+2) (0+0) (0+0) (0+0) (0+0) (0+0) (0+1) (0+0)	Ukraine; Juliya Dzhyma; Artem Tyshchenko	36:07.9 (0+0) (0+1) (0+0) (0+2) (0+1) (0+0) (0+2) (0+2)
2 x 6 km + 2 x 7.5 km Relay details	Norway; Fanny Welle-Strand Horn; Tiril Eckhoff; Johannes Thingnes Bø; Tarjei Bø	1:12:49.2 (0+1) (0+2) (0+2) (0+0) (0+0) (0+0) (0+1) (0+0)	Czech Republic; Veronika Vítková; Gabriela Soukalová; Michal Šlesingr; Ondřej Moravec	1:12:53.3 (0+1) (0+0) (0+0) (0+2) (0+0) (0+1) (0+0) (0+1)	Ukraine; Iryna Varvynets; Valj Semerenko; Dmytro Pidruchnyi; Serhiy Semenov	1:14:10.5 (0+0) (0+1) (0+2) (0+0) (0+0) (0+0) (1+3) (0+1)

== Achievements ==
Best performance for all time

- Nathan Smith (CAN),5th place in Pursuit and 7th place in Sprint
- Leif Nordgren (USA), 16th place in Sprint
- Antonin Guigonnat (FRA), 25th place in Pursuit
- Laura Dahlmeier (GER), 1st place in Sprint
- Franziska Hildebrand (GER), 2nd place in Sprint
- Coline Varcin (FRA), 8th place in Sprint
- Iryna Varvynets (UKR), 13th place in Sprint
- Lisa Vittozzi (ITA), 19th place in Sprint
- Vanessa Hinz (GER), 4th place in Pursuit
- Irina Kryuko (BLR), 10th place in Pursuit and 14th place in Sprint
- Luise Kummer (GER), 12th place in Pursuit

First World Cup race
