= Adèle Milloz =

French ski mountaineer (1996–2022)

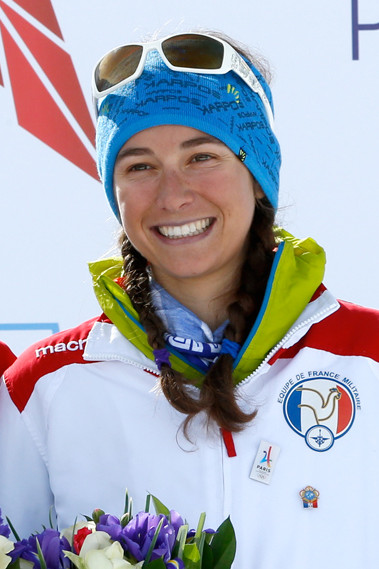
- Milloz in 2017

Personal information
- Born: 5 May 1996 Bourg-Saint-Maurice, Savoie, France
- Died: 12 August 2022 (aged 26) Aiguille du Peigne, Mont Blanc
- Education: National Ski and Mountaineering School
- Height: 170 cm (5 ft 7 in)
- Weight: 52 kg (115 lb)

Sport
- Country: France
- Sport: Ski mountaineering

Adèle Milloz (5 May 1996 – 12 August 2022) was a French ski mountaineer. She competed at the 2017 Winter Military World Games, winning a gold medal.

== Life ==
She was born in Bourg-Saint-Maurice, Savoie, France on 5 May 1996.

At the 2018 European Championships in Nicolosi, she won a gold medal in the sprint discipline.

She retired from the sport in 2019, and began her studies to become a mountain guide.

== Death ==
Milloz died on 12 August 2022, at the age of 26, together with another mountaineer, in an accident on Mont Blanc, along the normal route on the Aiguille du Peigne side. Other people have died on the same slope previously.
