= Flurina Volken =

Swiss biathlete (born 1993)

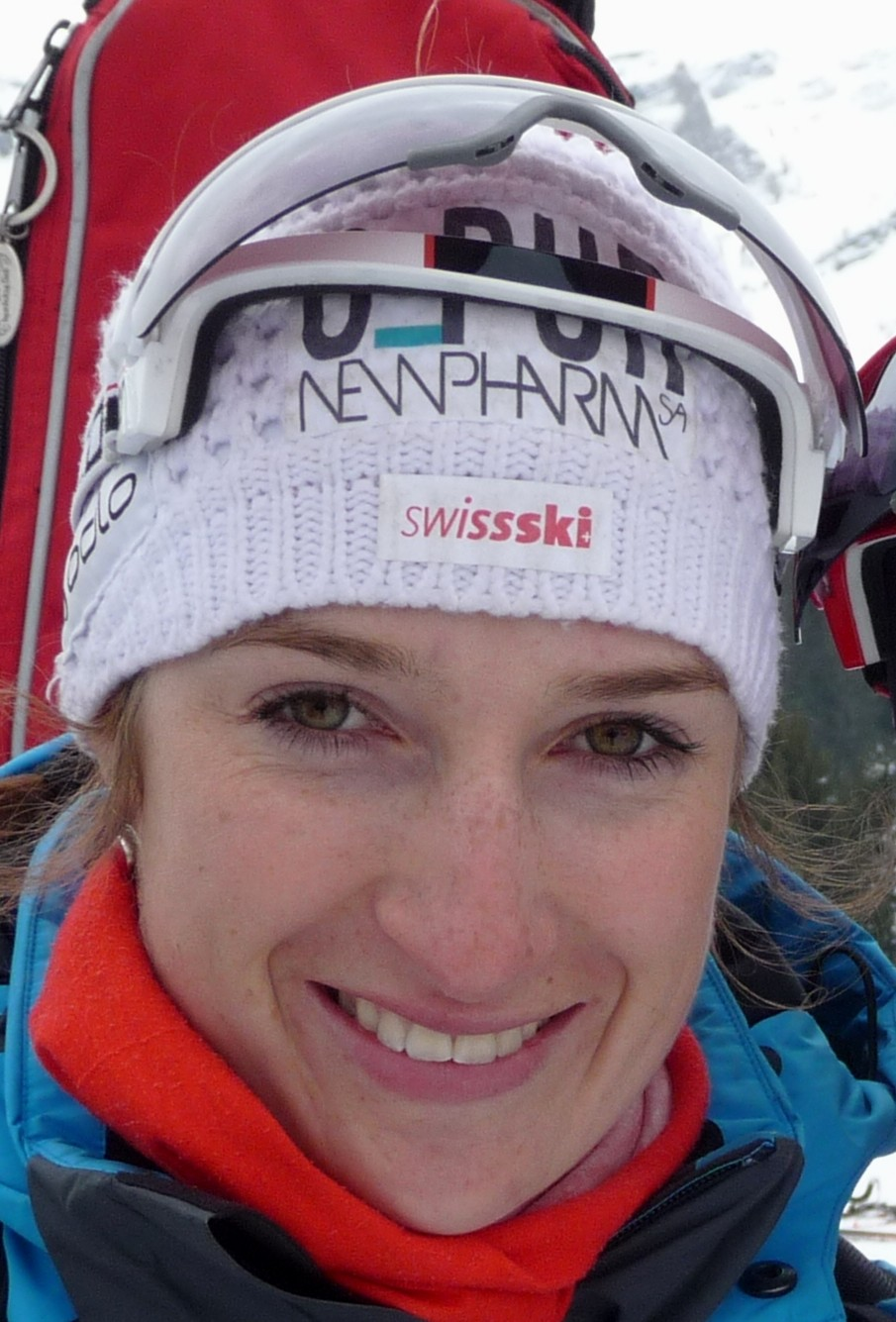

Personal information
- Nationality: Swiss
- Born: 7 September 1993 (age 31)

Sport
- Country: Switzerland
- Sport: Biathlon

Flurina Volken (born 7 September 1993) is a former Swiss biathlete. She competed in the 2014/15 World Cup season, and represented Switzerland at the Biathlon World Championships 2015 in Kontiolahti.

Volken represented Switzerland in the Biathlon at the 2018 PyeongChang Winter Olympics.

== Biathlon results ==
All results are sourced from the International Biathlon Union.

=== World Championships ===
Event	Individual	Sprint	Pursuit	Mass start	Relay	Mixed relay
(Finland) 2015 Kontiolahti	DNS	63rd	—	—	21st	—
