= Eevamari Rauhamäki =

Finnish biathlete

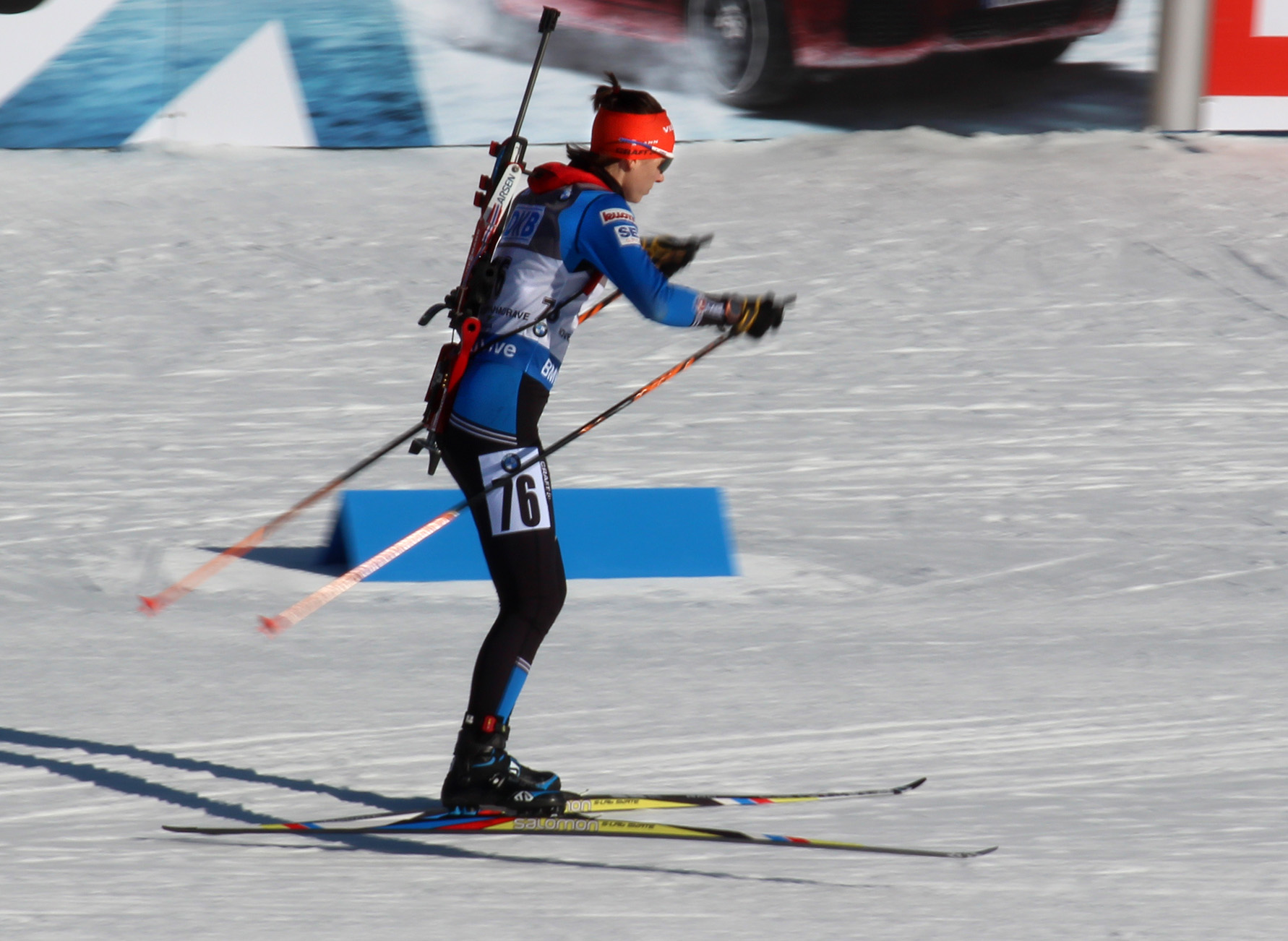

Personal information
- Nationality: Finnish
- Born: 23 February 1982 (age 43)

Sport
- Country: Finland
- Sport: Biathlon

Eevamari Rauhamäki (born 23 February 1982) is a Finnish biathlete. She competed in the 2014/15 world cup season, and represented Finland at the Biathlon World Championships 2015 in Kontiolahti.
