= Chu Yuanmeng =

Chinese biathlete (born 1999)

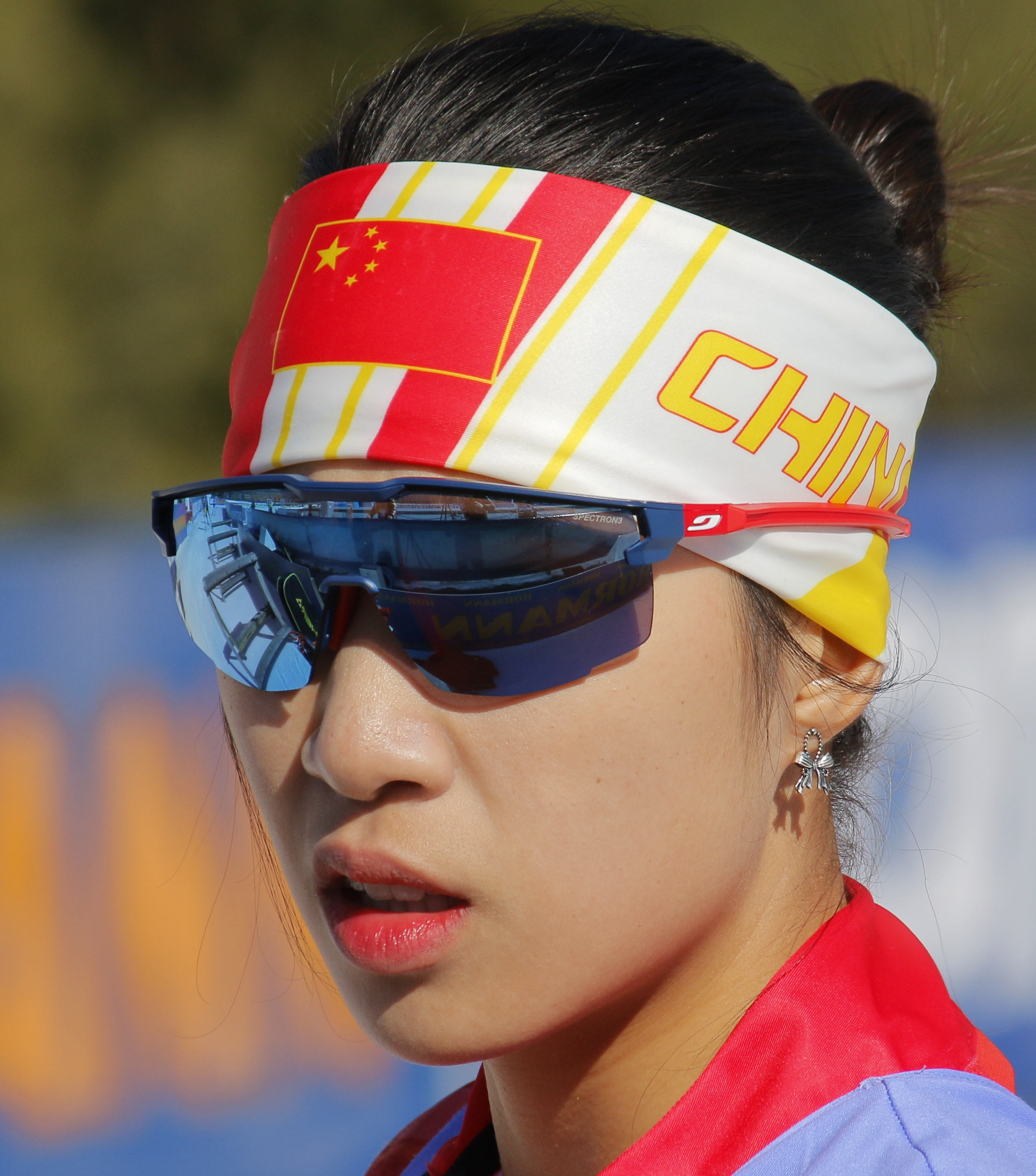
- Chu in 2023

Personal information
- Nationality: China
- Born: 21 November 1999 (age 26) Yakeshi, China

Sport
- Sport: Biathlon
Medal record
Women's biathlon
Representing China
Asian Games
Gold medal – first place	2025 Harbin	4 × 6 km relay
Winter Military World Games
Bronze medal – third place	2017 Sochi	7.5 km team sprint
Bronze medal – third place	2017 Sochi	15 km patrol race

Chu Yuanmeng (Chinese: 褚源蒙; pinyin: Chǔ Yuánméng; born 21 November 1999) is a Chinese biathlete. She competed in the 2022 Winter Olympics.

== Early life ==
Chu Yuanmeng was born on 21 November 1999 in Yakeshi, Hulunbuir, Inner Mongolia, China. Her father, Chu Jiming, was a railway worker on the Zhalomude Station in Hulunbuir, facing extreme cold weather in the winter. Chu went skiing for the first time at age seven with her father. She was encouraged to try biathlon by a coach who spotted her while she was competing in track and field, and started training in the sport by joining the People's Liberation Army Bayi Ski Team in 2011. Chu was first selected to the biathlon youth national team in 2015 after winning the national championship.

== Career ==
In 2016, Chu won a gold medal at the 13th National Winter Games of China in the women's 4×6km relay as a member of the Hulunbuir women's team. The following year, at the 2017 Winter Military World Games, she helped China win bronze medals in both the 7.5 km team sprint and the 15 km patrol race. In 2019, at the 14th National Winter Games (roller skiing events), Chu won a gold medal in the women's 4×6km relay and the silver medal in the women's 12.5km sprint individual event. The next month, she won two gold medals and one silver medal in the junior section of the 24th Summer Biathlon World Championships. Chu won a gold medal in the 4 × 6 km relay at the 2020–21 National Biathlon Championships.

In January 2022, Chu was named to the Chinese delegation for the 2022 Winter Olympics. She helped her team finish 12th in the relay race. She also placed 35th in the individual event and 61st in the sprint.

At the 2023–24 National Biathlon Championships in January 2024, Chu won the 4 × 6 km relay, 7.5km sprint, and 15km individual titles. The following month at the postponed 14th National Winter Games in 2024, she won a historic haul of four gold medals and two silver medals.

In January 2025, Chu was selected to the Chinese delegation for the 2025 Asian Winter Games. She helped her team win the gold medal in the relay race, and placed sixth in the sprint.
