= Gabrielė Leščinskaitė =

Lithuanian biathlete (born 1996)

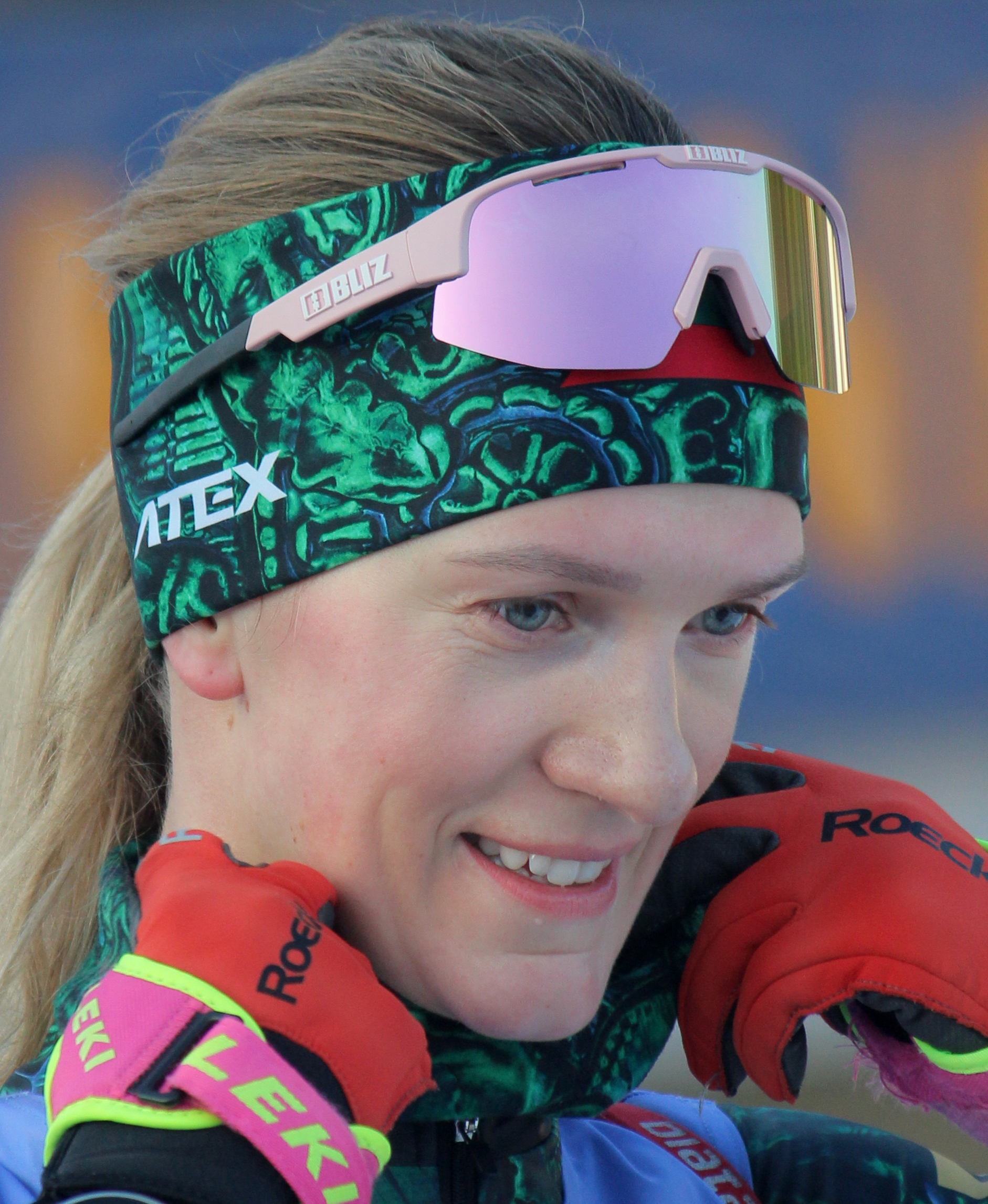
- Lescinskaite in 2023

Personal information
- Nationality: Lithuanian
- Citizenship: Lithuanian
- Born: 25 March 1996 (age 29); Pakruojis, Lithuania

Sport
- Country: Lithuania
- Sport: Biathlon
- Club: SK Vilimeksas
- Coached by: Ruslanas Nikitinas

Gabrielė Leščinskaitė (born 25 March 1996) is a Lithuanian biathlete and sport psychologist. She represented Lithuania at the Junior World Championships in 2012, 2013, 2014 and 2015, and at the Biathlon World Championships 2015 in Kontiolahti. In 2022 she represented Lithuania at the 2022 Beijing Olympics.

Leščinskaitė studied psychology at the Mykolas Romeris University. In 2022 she became a sport psychologist for the Lithuanian youth Olympic team at the 2022 European Youth Summer Olympic Festival.

In October 2023, Leščinskaitė announced her retirement from biathlon.

== Biathlon results ==
All results are sourced from the International Biathlon Union.

=== Olympic Games ===
0 medals

Event	Individual	Sprint	Pursuit	Mass start	Relay	Mixed relay
(China) 2022 Beijing	61st	63rd	—	—	—	—

=== World Championships ===
0 medals

Event	Individual	Sprint	Pursuit	Mass start	Relay	Mixed relay	Single Mixed relay
(Finland) 2015 Kontiolahti	39th	87th	—	—	20th	—	—
(Norway) 2016 Oslo	78th	91st	—	—	—	—	—
(Austria) 2017 Hochfilzen	—	—	—	—	21st	—	—
(Sweden) 2019 Östersund	76th	87th	—	—	—	—	—
(Italy) 2020 Antholz-Anterselva	DNF	69th	—	—	—	16th	—
(Slovenia) 2021 Pokljuka	58th	61st	—	—	—	17th	—
(Germany) 2023 Oberhof	47th	53rd	54th	—	—	18th	21st

*During Olympic seasons competitions are only held for those events not included in the Olympic program.
**The single mixed relay was added as an event in 2019.
