= Audrey Vaillancourt =

Canadian biathlete

Personal information
- Nationality: Canadian
- Born: 26 June 1991 (age 35)

Sport
- Country: Canada
- Sport: Biathlon
Medal record
Youth World Championships
Bronze medal – third place	2009 Canmore	6 km sprint

Audrey Vaillancourt (born 26 June 1991) is a Canadian former biathlete.

== Career ==
She competed in the 2013/14 and 2014/15 World Cup seasons. She represented Canada at the Biathlon World Championships 2013 in Nové Město na Moravě, Czech Republic, and at the Biathlon World Championships 2015 in Kontiolahti, Finland.
