= Yang Shuai (speed skater) =

Chinese speed skater

Personal information
- Nationality: Chinese
- Born: 28 November 1996 (age 29)

Sport
- Country: China
- Sport: Short track speed skating
Medal record
World Championships
Silver medal – second place	2019 Sofia	5000 m relay

Yang Shuai (born 28 November 1996) is a Chinese short track speed skater.

He participated at the 2019 World Short Track Speed Skating Championships, winning the silver medal in the 5000 m relay.
