= Luminița Pișcoran =

Romanian biathlete (born 1988)

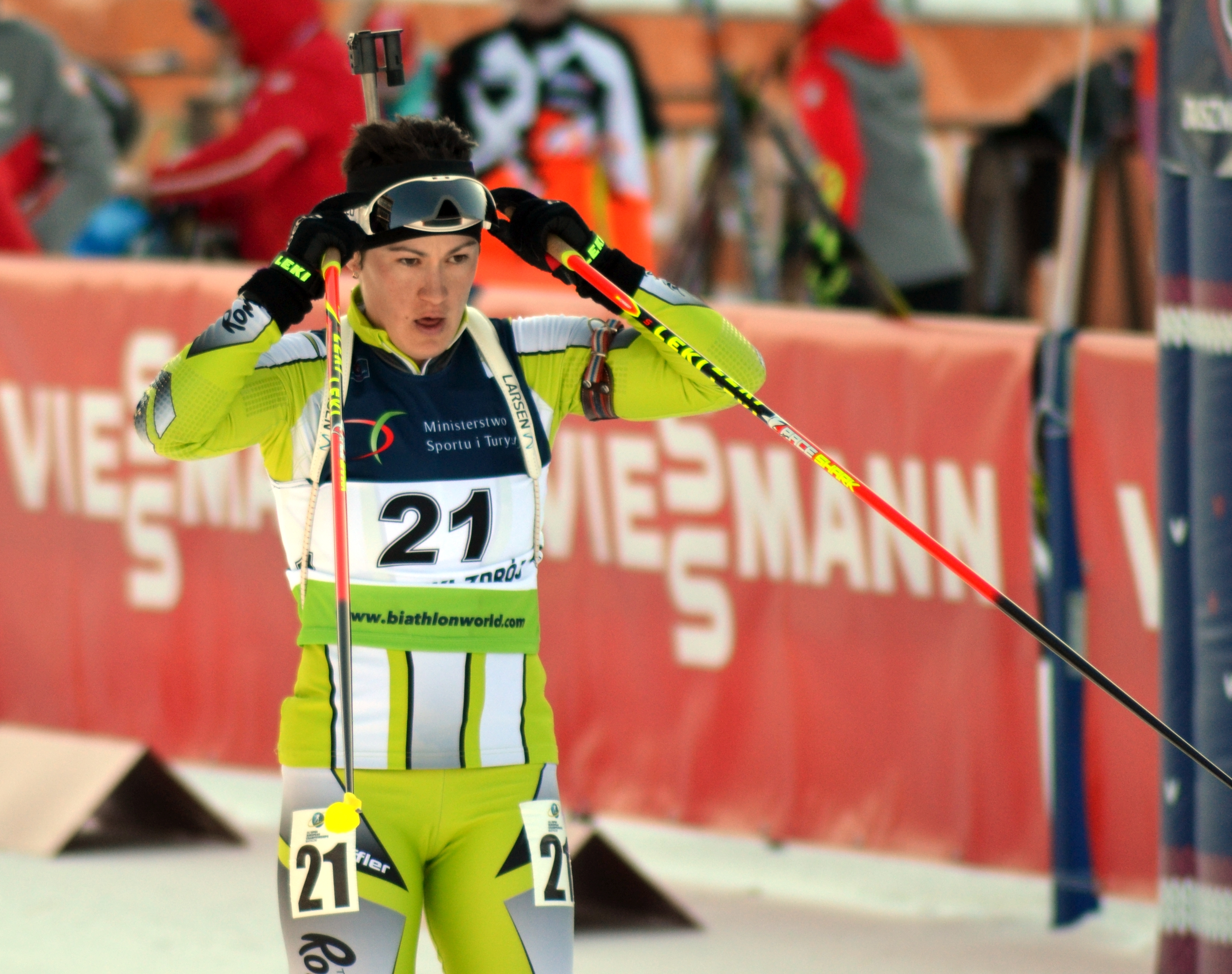
- Luminița Pișcoran at the European Championships 2017

Personal information
- Nationality: Romanian
- Born: 14 March 1988 (age 38)

Sport
- Country: Romania
- Sport: Biathlon
Medal record
European Championships
Gold medal – first place	2015 Otepää	15 km individual

Luminița Pișcoran (born 14 March 1988) is a Romanian biathlete.

== Career ==
Pișcoran competed in the 2014/15 world cup season, and represented Romania at the 2011, 2012, 2013 and 2015 Biathlon World Championships.
