= Karin Oberhofer =

Italian biathlete (born 1985)

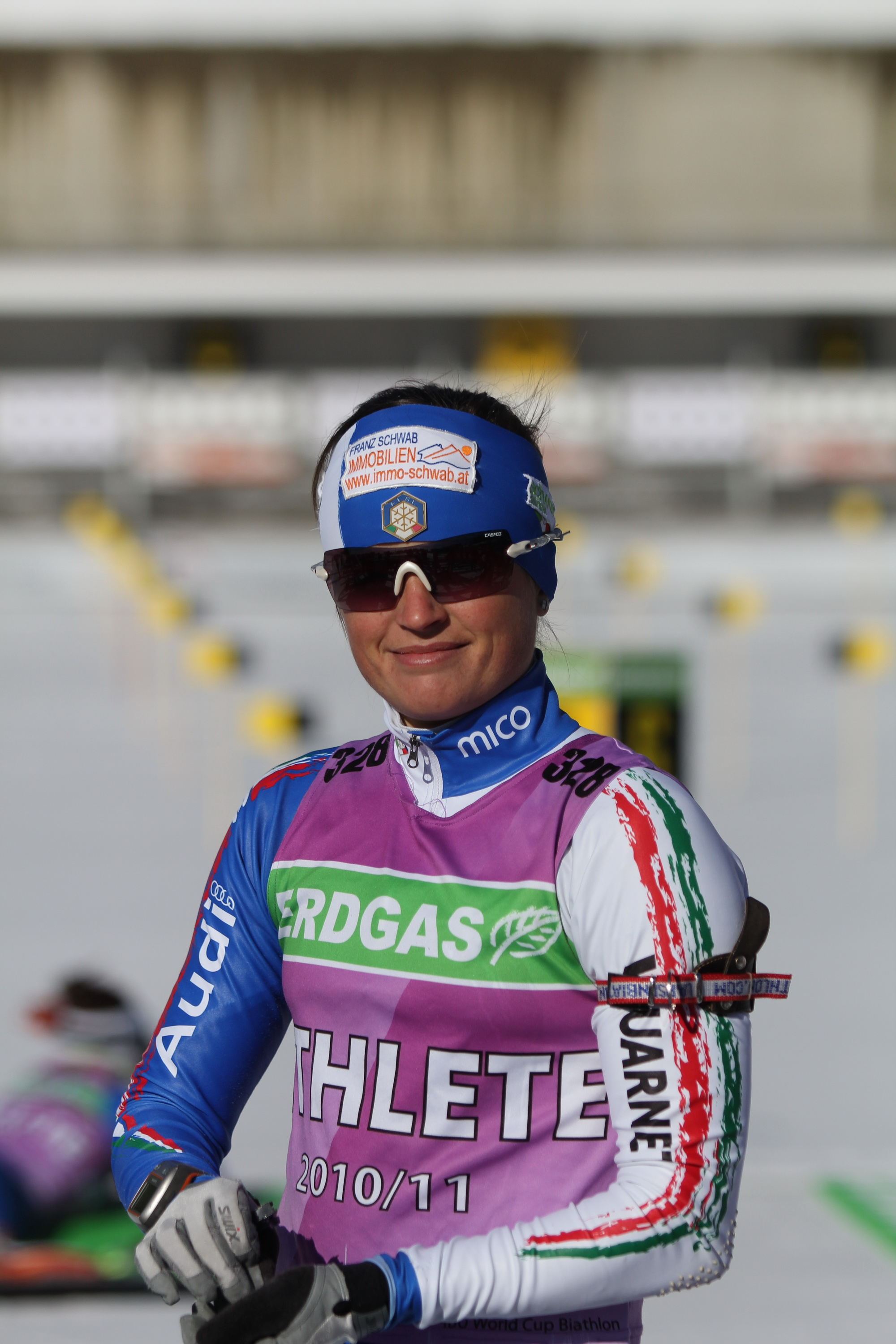

Personal information
- Born: 3 November 1985 (age 40) Brixen, Italy
- Height: 1.65 m (5 ft 5 in)

Sport

World Cup
- All victories: 1
- Individual podiums: 1
- All podiums: 6
Medal record
Women's biathlon
Representing Italy
Olympic Games
Bronze medal – third place	2014 Sochi	Mixed relay
World Championships
Bronze medal – third place	2013 Nové Město	Relay
Bronze medal – third place	2015 Kontiolahti	12.5 km mass start
Bronze medal – third place	2015 Kontiolahti	4 x 6 km relay
European Championships
Bronze medal – third place	2011 Ridnaun	4 × 6 km relay

Karin Oberhofer (born 3 November 1985) is an Italian biathlete. She competes in the Biathlon World Cup. Oberhofer has won a bronze medal at the Biathlon World Championships 2013 (4x6 km relay). She also competed at the 2010 Winter Olympics (11th place in the relay). Together with Dorothea Wierer, Dominik Windisch and Lukas Hofer she won a bronze medal in the Mixed relay at the 2014 Winter Olympics, in Sochi, Russia.

== Record ==
=== Olympic Games ===
Event	Individual	Sprint	Pursuit	Mass Start	Relay	Mixed Relay
(Canada) 2010 Vancouver	75th	47th	53rd	–	11th	—N/a
(Russia) 2014 Sochi	14th	4th	8th	13th	6th	Bronze

=== World Championships ===
Event	Individual	Sprint	Pursuit	Mass Start	Relay	Mixed Relay
(Italy) 2007 Antholz-Anterselva	75th	47th	53rd	–	8th	–
(Russia) 2011 Khanty-Mansiysk	15th	49th	DNS	–	4th	–
(Germany) 2012 Ruhpolding	41st	61st	–	–	12th	–
(Czech Republic) 2013 Nové Město na Moravě	29th	29th	26th	20th	Bronze	4th
(Finland) 2015 Kontiolahti	17th	30th	40th	Bronze	Bronze	7th

=== World Cup ===
==== Podiums ====
Season	Place	Competition	Placement
2009–10	(Finland) Kontiolahti	Mixed Relay	3rd
2014–15	(Austria) Hochfilzen	Sprint	2nd
2014–15	(Norway) Holmenkollen	Relay	2nd
2015–16	(Austria) Hochfilzen	Relay	1st
2015–16	(Germany) Ruhpolding	Relay	3rd
2015–16	(Canada) Canmore	Mixed Relay	2nd
