= Coline Varcin =

French biathlete (born 1993)

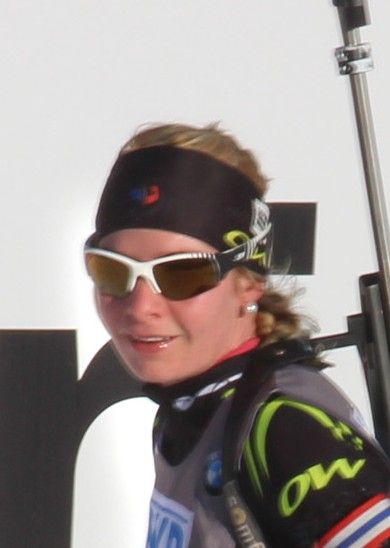
- Coline Varcin

Personal information
- Nationality: French
- Born: 28 January 1993 (age 33)

Sport

Professional information
- Sport: Biathlon
Medal record
Youth World Championships
Bronze medal – third place	2011 Nové Město	3 × 6 km relay
European Championships
Gold medal – first place	2015 Otepää	7.5 km sprint
Bronze medal – third place	2015 Otepää	4 x 6 km relay
World Military Games
Gold medal – first place	2017 Sochi	15 km patrol race
Silver medal – second place	2017 Sochi	7,5 km team sprint
Silver medal – second place	2017 Sochi	Mixed relay

Coline Varcin (born 28 January 1993) is a retired French biathlete. She competed in the 2014/15 World Cup season, and represented France at the Biathlon World Championships 2015 in Kontiolahti.

She competed at the 2017 Winter Military World Games, winning a gold medal in 15 km patrol race, silver medal in 7,5 km team sprint, and silver medal in Mixed relay, and at the 2014/15 World Cup season.
