= Enora Latuillière =

French biathlete (born 1992)

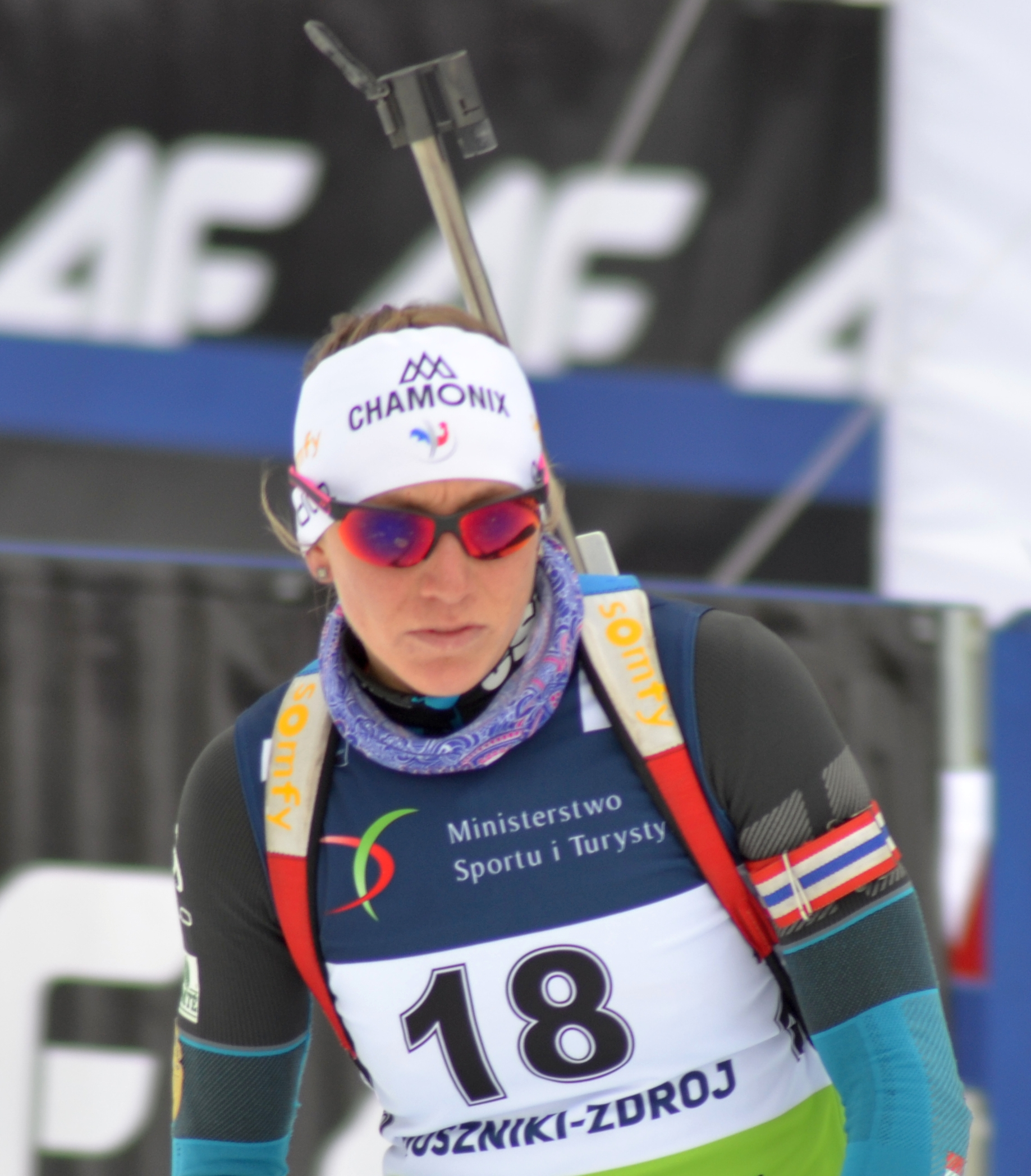
- Enora Latullière, 2017

Medal record

Women's biathlon

Representing France

World Championships
Silver medal – second place	2015 Kontiolahti	4 x 6 km relay

World Military Games
Gold medal – first place	2017 Sochi	15 km patrol race
Silver medal – second place	2017 Sochi	7,5 km team sprint
Silver medal – second place	2017 Sochi	Mixed relay

Enora Latuillière (born 31 July 1992) is a French biathlete. She competed in the 2014/15 World Cup season, and represented France at the Biathlon World Championships 2015 in Kontiolahti.
