= Vanessa Hinz =

German biathlete (born 1992)

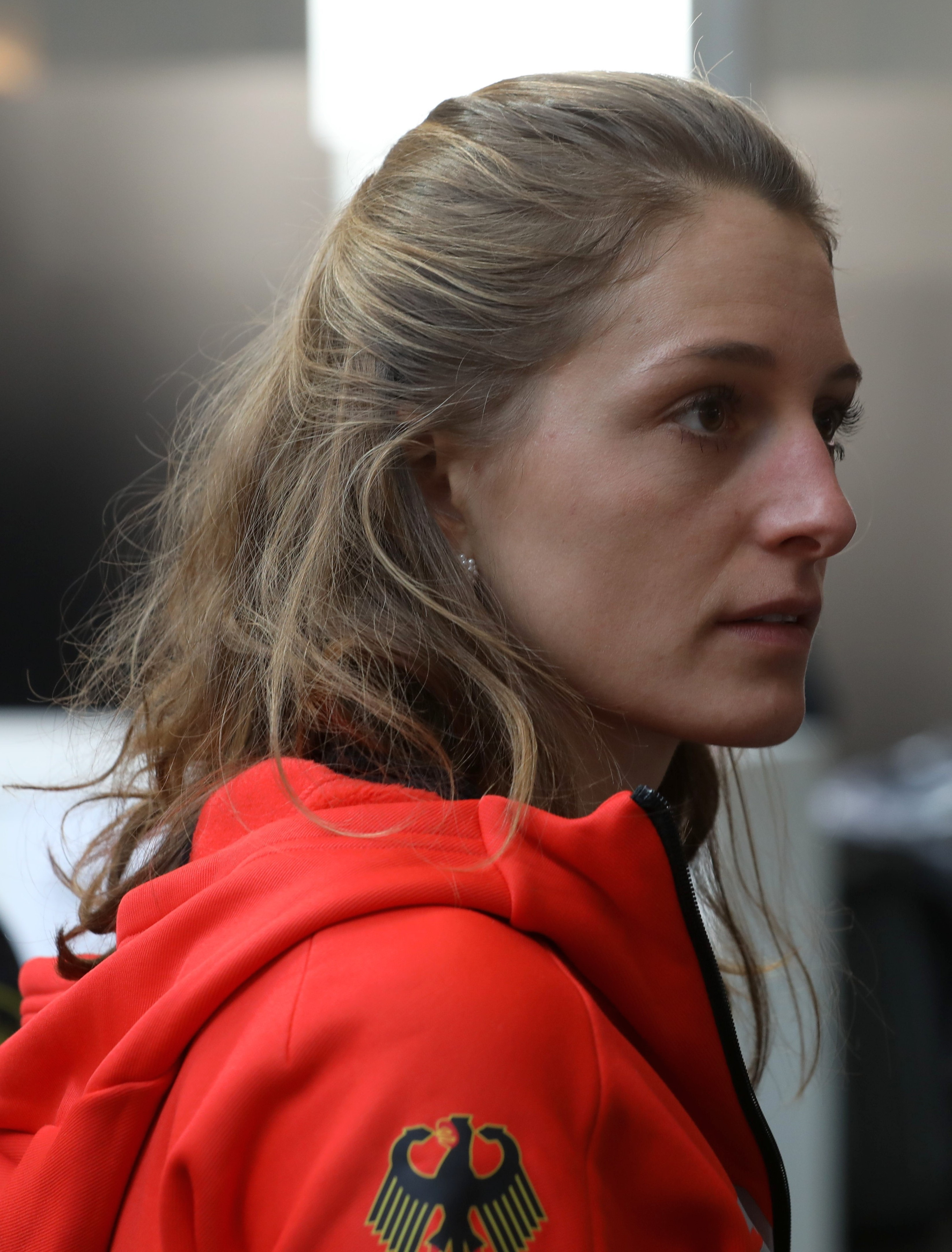
- Hinz in 2018

Personal information
- Nationality: German
- Born: 24 March 1992 (age 34) Munich, Germany
- Height: 1.76 m (5 ft 9 in)
- Weight: 61 kg (134 lb)

Sport

Professional information
- Sport: Biathlon
- Club: SC Schliersee
- World Cup debut: 2013

Olympic Games
- Teams: 2 (2018, 2022)
- Medals: 1 (0 gold)

World Championships
- Teams: 6 (2015–2021)
- Medals: 7 (3 gold)

World Cup
- Seasons: 11 (2012/13–2022/23)
- Individual victories: 1
- All victories: 11
- Individual podiums: 3
- All podiums: 26
- Overall titles: 0
- Discipline titles: 0
Medal record
Event	1st	2nd	3rd
Olympic Games	0	0	1
World Championships	3	4	0
Total	3	4	1
Women's biathlon
Representing Germany
Olympic Games
Bronze medal – third place	2022 Beijing	4 × 6 km relay
World Championships
Gold medal – first place	2015 Kontiolahti	4 x 6 km relay
Gold medal – first place	2017 Hochfilzen	4 x 6 km relay
Gold medal – first place	2017 Hochfilzen	Mixed relay
Silver medal – second place	2019 Östersund	Mixed relay
Silver medal – second place	2020 Antholz	15 km individual
Silver medal – second place	2020 Antholz	4 x 6 km relay
Silver medal – second place	2021 Pokljuka	4 x 6 km relay
European Championships
Gold medal – first place	2013 Bansko	4 x 6 km relay
Silver medal – second place	2014 Nové Město	4 x 6 km relay
Bronze medal – third place	2023 Lenzerheide	7.5 km sprint
Junior World Championships
Gold medal – first place	2013 Obertilliach	3 × 6 km relay

Vanessa Hinz (born 24 March 1992) is a former German biathlete and cross-country skier. Hinz started in her first world cup races at the end of the 2012/13-season. At the 2013 European Championships she won a gold medal with the German relay team. In 2014, she participated in the Winter Olympics in Sochi. She was officially nominated by the DOSB on 23 January 2014, but not taken with the team to Russia. So she had to wait at home as stand-by reserve.

== Biathlon results ==
All results are sourced from the International Biathlon Union.

=== Olympic Games ===
1 medal (1 bronze)

Year	Individual	Sprint	Pursuit	Mass start	Relay	Mixed relay	Single mixed relay
(South Korea) 2018 Pyeongchang	—	5th	13th	25th	—	4th	—N/a
(China) 2022 Beijing	14th	55th	21st	15th	Bronze	—	—

*The mixed relay was added as an event in 2014.

=== World Championships ===
7 medals (3 gold, 4 silver)

Year	Individual	Sprint	Pursuit	Mass start	Relay	Mixed relay	Single mixed relay
(Finland) 2015 Kontiolahti	44th	49th	37th	—	Gold	—	—N/a
(Norway) 2016 Oslo	37th	61st	—	—	—	—	—N/a
(Austria) 2017 Hochfilzen	8th	6th	20th	20th	Gold	Gold	—N/a
(Sweden) 2019 Östersund	19th	65th	—	—	4th	Silver	—
(Italy) 2020 Antholz	Silver	14th	5th	17th	Silver	—	—
(Slovenia) 2021 Pokljuka	33rd	12th	6th	10th	Silver	—	—

=== World Cup ===
Season	Age	Overall		Individual		Sprint		Pursuit		Mass start	
Season	Age	Points	Position	Points	Position	Points	Position	Points	Position	Points	Position
2013/14	22	64	60th	21	69th	42	51st	—	—	—	—
2014/15	23	412	20th	190	14th	128	19th	2	67th	92	19th
2015/16	24	304	27th	114	25th	91	29th	21	43rd	78	22nd
2016/17	25	436	19th	89	33rd	112	28th	103	2nd	132	8th
2017/18	26	522	10th	141	15th	176	9th	10	46th	195	3rd
2018/19	27	341	27th	80	35th	90	30th	69	11th	104	17th
2019/20	28	394	16th	126	19th	107	12th	91	8th	70	24th
2020/21	29	364	24th	37	32nd	103	31st	133	18th	79	23rd
2021/22	30	262	26th	17	42nd	112	28th	107	23rd	26	34th

=== Individual podiums ===
No.	Season	Date	Location	Race	Level	Placement
1	2017/18	11 March 2018	Kontiolahti, Finland	12.5 km Mass Start	World Cup	Gold
2	2018/19	27 January 2019	Antholz, Italy	12.5 km Mass Start	World Cup	Bronze
3	2019/20	18 February 2020	Antholz, Italy	15 km Individual	World Championships	Silver

*Results are from IBU races which include the Biathlon World Cup, Biathlon World Championships and the Winter Olympic Games.

Updated on 11 March 2022

=== Relay victories ===
- 10 victories – (9 relay, 1 mixed relay)

No.	Season	Date	Location	Discipline	Level	Teammate
1	2014–15	13 December 2014	Hochfilzen, Austria	4x6 km relay	World Cup	Kummer / Hildebrand / Preuß
2	2014–15	13 March 2015	Kontiolahti, Finland	4x6 km relay	World Championships	Hildebrand / Preuß / Dahlmeier
3	2016–17	11 December 2016	Pokljuka, Slovenia	4x6 km relay	World Cup	Hildebrand / Hammerschmidt / Dahlmeier
4	2016–17	12 January 2017	Ruhpolding, Germany	4x6 km relay	World Cup	Hammerschmidt / Preuß / Dahlmeier
5	2016–17	22 January 2017	Antholz, Italy	4x6 km relay	World Cup	Hammerschmidt / Hildebrand / Dahlmeier
6	2016–17	9 February 2017	Hochfilzen, Austria	Mixed relay	World Championships	Dahlmeier / Peiffer / Schempp
7	2016–17	17 February 2017	Hochfilzen, Austria	4x6 km relay	World Championships	Hammerschmidt / Hildebrand / Dahlmeier
8	2017–18	10 December 2017	Hochfilzen, Austria	4x6 km relay	World Cup	Hildebrand / Hammerschmidt / Dahlmeier
9	2018–19	8 February 2019	Canmore, Canada	4x6 km relay	World Cup	Hildebrand / Dahlmeier / Herrmann
10	2020–21	16 January 2021	Oberhof, Germany	4x6 km relay	World Cup	Hettich-Walz / Herrmann-Wick / Preuss
