= Veronika Vítková =

Czech biathlete (born 1988)

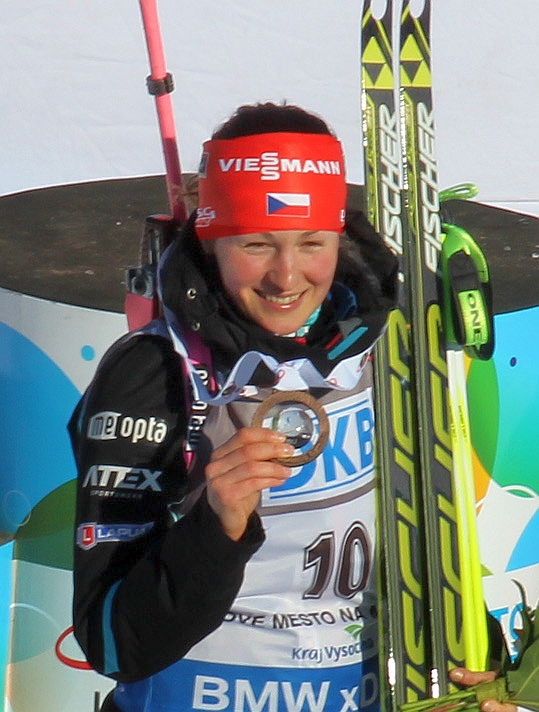

Personal information
- Born: 9 December 1988 (age 37) Vrchlabí, Czechoslovakia
- Height: 1.66 m (5 ft 5 in)

Sport
Medal record
Women's biathlon
Representing Czech Republic
Olympic Games
Silver medal – second place	2014 Sochi	Mixed relay
Bronze medal – third place	2014 Sochi	4 x 6 km relay
Bronze medal – third place	2018 Pyeongchang	7.5 km sprint
World Championships
Gold medal – first place	2015 Kontiolahti	Mixed relay
Bronze medal – third place	2013 Nové Město	Mixed relay
Junior World Championships
Gold medal – first place	2009 Canmore	3 × 6 km relay
Silver medal – second place	2008 Ruhpolding	10 km pursuit
Silver medal – second place	2009 Canmore	10 km pursuit
Youth World Championships
Gold medal – first place	2006 Presque Isle	10 km individual

Veronika Vítková (Czech pronunciation: [ˈvɛronɪka ˈviːtkovaː]; born 9 December 1988) is a Czech former biathlete. She comes from a family of skiers and switched from cross-country to biathlon at age 10. She competed for the Czech Republic at the 2010, 2014 and 2018 Winter Olympics. At the 2014 Winter Olympics, together with Ondřej Moravec, Jaroslav Soukup and Gabriela Soukalová, she won a silver medal in the Mixed relay. At the 2018 Winter Olympics she won the bronze medal in the 7.5 km sprint event.

In April 2020, she announced retirement and her pregnancy.

== Record ==
=== Olympic Games ===
3 medals (1 silver, 2 bronze)

Event	Individual	Sprint	Pursuit	Mass Start	Relay	Mixed Relay
(Canada) 2010 Vancouver	68th	24th	36th	–	16th	—N/a
(Russia) 2014 Sochi	6th	16th	21st	8th	Bronze	Silver
(South Korea) 2018 Pyeongchang	18th	Bronze	7th	14th	12th	8th

=== World Championships ===
2 medals (1 gold, 1 bronze)

Event	Individual	Sprint	Pursuit	Mass start	Relay	Mixed relay
(Sweden) 2008 Östersund	14th	57th	DNS	—	16th	12th
(South Korea) 2009 Pyeongchang	5th	18th	10th	12th	10th	—
(Russia) 2011 Khanty-Mansiysk	8th	55th	34th	30th	11th	11th
(Germany) 2012 Ruhpolding	15th	25th	18th	14th	10th	8th
(Czech Republic) 2013 Nové Město	14th	10th	8th	19th	10th	Bronze
(Finland) 2015 Kontiolahti	8th	15th	11th	29th	8th	Gold
(Norway) 2016 Oslo	4th	7th	8th	6th	6th	6th
(Austria) 2017 Hochfilzen	50th	68th	—	—	4th	—
(Sweden) 2019 Östersund	13th	38th	16th	17th	15th	6th

=== World Cup ===
==== Podiums ====
Season	Place	Competition	Placement
2012–13	(Germany) Oberhof	Pursuit	2nd
2013–14	(Austria) Hochfilzen	Sprint	2nd
2013–14	(Germany) Ruhpolding	Individual	3rd
2014–15	(Sweden) Östersund	Sprint	2nd
2014–15	(Germany) Oberhof	Sprint	1st
2014–15	(Germany) Oberhof	Mass Start	2nd
2014–15	(Germany) Ruhpolding	Mass Start	3rd
2014–15	(Czech Republic) Nové Město na Moravě	Sprint	3rd
2014–15	(Norway) Holmenkollen	Individual	3rd
2017–18	(Germany) Oberhof	Sprint	3rd
2017–18	(Germany) Ruhpolding	Mass Start	3rd
2017–18	(Italy) Antholz	Sprint	3rd
2017–18	(South Korea) Pyeongchang	Sprint (OG)	3rd

=== World Cup Relay ===
==== Podiums ====
Season	Place	Competition	Placement
2011–12	(Austria) Hochfilzen	Mixed Relay	2nd
2012–13	(Sweden) Östersund	Mixed Relay	3rd
2012–13	(Germany) Ruhpolding	Relay	3rd
2012–13	(Czech Republic) Nové Město na Moravě	Mixed Relay (WCH)	3rd
2013–14	(Sweden) Östersund	Mixed Relay	1st
2013–14	(Russia) Sochi	Mixed Relay (OG)	2nd
2014–15	(Austria) Hochfilzen	Relay	3rd
2014–15	(Germany) Oberhof	Relay	1st
2014–15	(Germany) Ruhpolding	Relay	1st
2014–15	(Italy) Antholz	Relay	2nd
2014–15	(Czech Republic) Nové Město na Moravě	Mixed Relay	2nd
2014–15	(Norway) Holmenkollen	Relay	1st
2014–15	(Finland) Kontiolahti	Mixed Relay (WCH)	1st
2015–16	(Sweden) Östersund	Mixed Relay	3rd
2015–16	(Italy) Antholz	Relay	2nd
2015–16	(United States) Presque Isle	Relay	1st
2018–19	(Germany) Oberhof	Relay	3rd

=== World Cup Position ===
Season	Age	Overall			Sprint			Pursuit			Individual			Mass start		
Season	Age	Races	Points	Position	Races	Points	Position	Races	Points	Position	Races	Points	Position	Races	Points	Position
2007/08	19	4/26	18	59th	3/10	—	—	—	—	—	1/3	18	31st	—	—	—
2008/09	20	14/26	196	36th	7/10	60	44th	3/7	53	37th	2/4	40	33rd	2/5	43	34th
2009/10	21	8/25	53	63rd	4/10	36	56th	2/6	6	71st	2/4	11	62nd	—	—	—
2010/11	22	19/26	139	43rd	9/10	50	46th	6/7	37	45th	3/4	41	35th	1/5	11	50th
2011/12	23	19/26	336	25th	8/10	133	24th	6/8	99	24th	2/3	26	36th	3/5	78	21st
2012/13	24	25/26	511	16th	10/10	159	23rd	7/8	196	15th	3/3	37	27th	5/5	119	17th
2013/14	25	21/22	551	9th	9/9	221	7th	8/8	216	7th	1/2	48	13th	3/3	76	12th
2014/15	26	25/25	793	4th	10/10	347	3rd	7/7	194	9th	3/3	122	3rd	5/5	139	10th
2015/16	27	24/24	703	8th	9/9	238	7th	8/8	217	8th	3/3	106	6th	5/5	142	9th
2016/17	28	21/26	389	25th	8/9	111	28th	7/9	151	22nd	3/3	32	34th	3/5	95	20th
2017/18	29	19/22	545	8th	7/8	245	5th	6/7	149	12th	2/2	58	7th	4/5	93	18th
2018/19	30	21/26	253	30th	9/9	82	34th	7/8	113	27th	3/3	31	36th	2/5	28	34th
2019/20	31	2/21	—	—	1/8	—	—	—	—	—	1/3	—	—	—	—	—
