= Biathlon World Championships 2015 =

Sports competition in Kontiolahti, Finland

- Host city: Kontiolahti
- Country: Finland
- Events: 11
- Opening: 5 March
- Closing: 15 March

The 47th Biathlon World Championships were held in Kontiolahti, Finland from 5 March to 15 March 2015.

There were a total of 11 competitions: sprint, pursuit, individual, mass start, and relay races for men and women, and mixed relay. All the events during this championships also counted for the 2014–15 Biathlon World Cup season.

== Schedule ==
All times are local (UTC+2).

Date	Time	Event
5 March	18:15	2 × 6 km + 2 × 7.5 km mixed relay
7 March	14:00	Men's 10 km sprint
7 March	17:30	Women's 7.5 km sprint
8 March	14:15	Men's 12.5 km pursuit
8 March	17:00	Women's 10 km pursuit
11 March	18:15	Women's 15 km individual
12 March	18:15	Men's 20 km individual
13 March	18:15	Women's 4 × 6 km relay
14 March	17:30	Men's 4 × 7.5 km relay
15 March	14:30	Women's 12.5 km mass start
15 March	17:15	Men's 15 km mass start

== Medal winners ==
=== Men ===
Event	Gold		Silver		Bronze	
10 km sprint	Johannes Thingnes Bø; Norway	24:12.8 (0+1)	Nathan Smith; Canada	24:24.9 (0+1)	Tarjei Bø; Norway	24:38.1 (0+0)
12.5 km pursuit	Erik Lesser; Germany	30:47.9 (0+0+0+0)	Anton Shipulin; Russia	31:04.9 (0+1+0+0)	Tarjei Bø; Norway	31:06.6 (0+0+1+0)
20 km individual	Martin Fourcade; France	47:29.4 (0+1+0+0)	Emil Hegle Svendsen; Norway	47:50.3 (0+0+0+0)	Ondřej Moravec; Czech Republic	48:09.9 (0+1+0+0)
4 × 7.5 km relay	Germany Erik Lesser; Daniel Böhm; Arnd Peiffer; Simon Schempp	1:13:49.5 (0+0) (0+0) (0+0) (0+2) (0+0) (0+0) (0+0) (0+1)	Norway Ole Einar Bjørndalen; Tarjei Bø; Johannes Thingnes Bø; Emil Hegle Svendsen	1:14:04.9 (0+0) (0+0) (0+0) (0+3) (0+0) (0+2) (0+0) (0+1)	France Simon Fourcade; Jean-Guillaume Béatrix; Quentin Fillon Maillet; Martin Fourcade	1:14:23.1 (0+0) (0+0) (0+1) (0+1) (0+1) (0+0) (0+1) (0+0)
15 km mass start	Jakov Fak; Slovenia	36:24.9 (0+0+1+0)	Ondřej Moravec; Czech Republic	36:25.9 (1+0+0+0)	Tarjei Bø; Norway	36:28.6 (0+0+1+0)

=== Women ===
Event	Gold		Silver		Bronze	
7.5 km sprint	Marie Dorin Habert; France	22:16.8 (0+1)	Weronika Nowakowska-Ziemniak; Poland	22:26.4 (0+0)	Valentyna Semerenko; Ukraine	22:36.5 (0+1)
10 km pursuit	Marie Dorin Habert; France	30:07.7 (0+0+2+1)	Laura Dahlmeier; Germany	30:23.0 (1+0+0+1)	Weronika Nowakowska-Ziemniak; Poland	30:39.3 (0+1+2+0)
15 km individual	Ekaterina Yurlova; Russia	41:32.2 (0+0+0+0)	Gabriela Soukalová; Czech Republic	41:55.4 (0+0+0+1)	Kaisa Mäkäräinen; Finland	41:56.6 (0+1+1+0)
4 × 6 km relay	Germany Franziska Hildebrand; Franziska Preuß; Vanessa Hinz; Laura Dahlmeier	1:11:54.6 (0+0) (0+2) (0+1) (0+2) (0+0) (0+1) (0+0) (0+0)	France Anaïs Bescond; Enora Latuillière; Justine Braisaz; Marie Dorin Habert	1:12:54.9 (0+0) (0+1) (0+1) (0+1) (1+3) (0+1) (0+2) (0+0)	Italy Lisa Vittozzi; Karin Oberhofer; Nicole Gontier; Dorothea Wierer	1:13:00.7 (0+0) (0+0) (0+1) (0+3) (0+2) (0+2) (0+0) (0+1)
12.5 km mass start	Valentyna Semerenko; Ukraine	34:32.9 (0+0+0+0)	Franziska Preuß; Germany	34:39.1 (0+0+0+1)	Karin Oberhofer; Italy	34:45.5 (1+1+0+0)

=== Mixed ===
Event	Gold		Silver		Bronze	
2 × 6 + 2 × 7.5 km W+M relay	Czech Republic Veronika Vítková; Gabriela Soukalová; Michal Šlesingr; Ondřej Moravec	1:20:27.2 (0+2) (0+2) (0+0) (0+0) (0+0) (0+2) (0+1) (0+1)	France Anaïs Bescond; Marie Dorin Habert; Jean-Guillaume Béatrix; Martin Fourcade	1:20:47.4 (0+1) (0+3) (0+0) (0+1) (0+0) (0+3) (0+0) (0+0)	Norway Fanny Welle-Strand Horn; Tiril Eckhoff; Johannes Thingnes Bø; Tarjei Bø	1:20:54.9 (0+0) (0+0) (0+0) (1+3) (0+0) (0+0) (0+0) (0+0)

== Medal table ==
=== Top nations ===
Rank	Nation	Gold	Silver	Bronze	Total
1	France (FRA)	3	2	1	6
2	Germany (GER)	3	2	0	5
3	Norway (NOR)	1	2	4	7
4	Czech Republic (CZE)	1	2	1	4
5	Russia (RUS)	1	1	0	2
6	Ukraine (UKR)	1	0	1	2
7	Slovenia (SVN)	1	0	0	1
8	Poland (POL)	0	1	1	2
9	Canada (CAN)	0	1	0	1
10	Italy (ITA)	0	0	2	2
11	Finland (FIN)	0	0	1	1
Totals (11 entries)		11	11	11	33

=== Top athletes ===
All athletes with three or more medals.

Rank	Nation	Gold	Silver	Bronze	Total
1	Marie Dorin Habert (FRA)	2	2	0	4
2	Johannes Thingnes Bø (NOR)	1	1	1	3
2	Martin Fourcade (FRA)	1	1	1	3
2	Ondřej Moravec (CZE)	1	1	1	3
5	Tarjei Bø (NOR)	0	1	4	5
