= Biathlon World Championships 2017 – Women's individual =

Women's individual at the Biathlon World Championships 2017
- Location: Hochfilzen, Austria
- Dates: 15 February
- Competitors: 99 from 31 nations
- Winning time: 41:30.1

Medalists
gold medal	Laura Dahlmeier	Germany
silver medal	Gabriela Koukalová	Czech Republic
bronze medal	Alexia Runggaldier	Italy

The Women's individual competition at the 2017 World Championships was held on 15 February 2017.

== Results ==
The race was started at 14:30.

Rank	Bib	Name	Nationality	Time	Penalties (P+S+P+S)	Deficit
1st place, gold medalist(s)	93	Laura Dahlmeier	Germany	41:30.1	1 (1+0+0+0)	
2nd place, silver medalist(s)	51	Gabriela Koukalová	Czech Republic	41:54.8	1 (1+0+0+0)	+24.7
3rd place, bronze medalist(s)	70	Alexia Runggaldier	Italy	43:15.7	0 (0+0+0+0)	+1:45.6
4	11	Mari Laukkanen	Finland	43:26.7	1 (0+0+1+0)	+1:56.8
5	35	Ekaterina Avvakumova	South Korea	43:33.7	0 (0+0+0+0)	+2:03.6
6	98	Susan Dunklee	United States	43:36.9	2 (1+0+0+1)	+2:06.8
7	54	Maren Hammerschmidt	Germany	43:57.6	2 (0+0+2+0)	+2:27.5
8	90	Vanessa Hinz	Germany	44:15.6	2 (0+1+0+1)	+2:45.5
9	80	Yuliia Dzhima	Ukraine	44:16.2	2 (0+0+1+1)	+2:46.1
10	48	Olena Pidhrushna	Ukraine	44:24.7	2 (1+0+0+1)	+2:54.6
11	79	Dunja Zdouc	Austria	44:26.5	0 (0+0+0+0)	+2:56.4
12	15	Teja Gregorin	Slovenia	44:34.9	3 (0+2+0+1)	+3:04.8
13	91	Darya Domracheva	Belarus	44:45.6	3 (0+2+0+1)	+3:15.5
14	5	Iryna Kryuko	Belarus	44:54.4	1 (1+0+0+0)	+3:24.3
15	83	Kaisa Mäkäräinen	Finland	44:54.6	4 (0+1+1+2)	+3:24.5
16	76	Dorothea Wierer	Italy	45:03.4	3 (1+1+1+0)	+3:33.3
17	64	Nadezhda Skardino	Belarus	45:11.4	2 (0+0+1+1)	+3:41.3
18	26	Julia Ransom	Canada	45:18.3	1 (1+0+0+0)	+3:48.2
19	56	Zhang Yan	China	45:19.4	1 (1+0+0+0)	+3:49.3
20	25	Iryna Varvynets	Ukraine	45:21.5	1 (0+1+0+0)	+3:51.4
21	14	Galina Vishnevskaya	Kazakhstan	45:23.7	1 (0+0+0+1)	+3:53.6
22	50	Clare Egan	United States	45:25.1	2 (0+0+0+2)	+3:55.0
23	69	Eva Puskarčíková	Czech Republic	45:29.5	2 (0+1+0+1)	+3:59.4
24	97	Emilia Yordanova	Bulgaria	45:32.3	1 (0+0+1+0)	+4:02.2
25	43	Célia Aymonier	France	45:33.0	3 (1+2+0+0)	+4:02.9
26	84	Olga Podchufarova	Russia	45:33.1	2 (1+0+0+1)	+4:03.0
27	27	Paulína Fialková	Slovakia	45:33.4	3 (1+1+1+0)	+4:03.3
28	68	Aita Gasparin	Switzerland	45:35.2	1 (0+0+1+0)	+4:05.1
29	32	Alina Raikova	Kazakhstan	45:35.3	1 (0+0+0+1)	+4:05.2
30	73	Monika Hojnisz	Poland	45:37.5	1 (0+1+0+0)	+4:07.4
31	88	Franziska Hildebrand	Germany	45:42.3	2 (0+1+0+1)	+4:12.2
32	61	Amanda Lightfoot	Great Britain	45:47.0	1 (0+1+0+0)	+4:16.9
33	77	Anastasiya Merkushyna	Ukraine	45:47.5	2 (1+0+1+0)	+4:17.4
34	16	Anna Frolina	South Korea	45:49.3	2 (0+0+0+2)	+4:19.2
35	22	Darya Yurkevich	Belarus	45:49.7	1 (0+1+0+0)	+4:19.6
36	41	Lisa Vittozzi	Italy	45:51.0	3 (2+0+0+1)	+4:20.9
37	59	Magdalena Gwizdoń	Poland	45:53.6	1 (0+0+0+1)	+4:23.5
38	92	Anaïs Chevalier	France	45:58.6	2 (1+0+0+1)	+4:28.5
39	81	Tiril Eckhoff	Norway	46:17.1	4 (2+1+1+0)	+4:47.0
40	75	Marie Dorin Habert	France	46:25.7	4 (2+1+0+1)	+4:55.6
41	65	Jana Gereková	Slovakia	46:28.6	3 (1+1+1+0)	+4:58.5
42	46	Irina Starykh	Russia	46:41.3	3 (0+1+2+0)	+5:11.2
43	55	Megan Tandy	Canada	46:44.1	2 (0+0+1+1)	+5:14.0
44	24	Mona Brorsson	Sweden	46:45.3	2 (1+1+0+0)	+5:15.2
45	18	Selina Gasparin	Switzerland	46:53.5	4 (0+1+2+1)	+5:23.4
46	94	Elisa Gasparin	Switzerland	46:53.6	3 (1+1+1+0)	+5:23.5
47	52	Kaia Wøien Nicolaisen	Norway	46:54.9	3 (0+1+2+0)	+5:24.8
48	87	Justine Braisaz	France	47:02.8	4 (1+1+2+0)	+5:32.7
49	10	Fuyuko Tachizaki	Japan	47:20.1	4 (1+1+1+1)	+5:50.0
50	58	Veronika Vítková	Czech Republic	47:31.8	5 (2+0+1+2)	+6:01.7
51	9	Tatiana Akimova	Russia	47:42.4	5 (0+3+0+2)	+6:12.3
52	8	Krystyna Guzik	Poland	47:47.3	4 (1+1+1+1)	+6:17.2
53	20	Anaïs Bescond	France	47:56.7	4 (2+1+1+0)	+6:26.6
54	95	Federica Sanfilippo	Italy	48:00.6	5 (2+2+1+0)	+6:30.5
55	53	Hanna Öberg	Sweden	48:01.0	5 (1+2+0+2)	+6:30.9
56	1	Joanne Reid	United States	48:06.8	4 (1+2+1+0)	+6:36.7
57	34	Johanna Talihärm	Estonia	48:12.0	2 (1+0+0+1)	+6:41.9
58	86	Marte Olsbu	Norway	48:18.3	5 (3+0+1+1)	+6:48.2
59	89	Anna Magnusson	Sweden	48:20.8	4 (2+1+1+0)	+6:50.7
60	2	Christina Rieder	Austria	48:22.6	2 (0+1+0+1)	+6:52.5
61	12	Lisa Hauser	Austria	48:26.1	5 (2+0+3+0)	+6:56.0
62	4	Rosanna Crawford	Canada	48:31.6	3 (3+0+0+0)	+7:01.5
63	13	Fanny Horn Birkeland	Norway	48:32.4	5 (1+0+3+1)	+7:02.3
64	78	Emma Lunder	Canada	48:48.0	4 (2+1+0+1)	+7:17.9
65	7	Baiba Bendika	Latvia	48:48.7	4 (1+1+1+1)	+7:18.6
66	72	Ivona Fialková	Slovakia	48:49.1	5 (0+1+2+2)	+7:19.0
67	6	Emma Nilsson	Sweden	48:56.1	4 (1+0+2+1)	+7:26.0
68	30	Sari Furuya	Japan	49:15.6	6 (2+2+1+1)	+7:45.5
69	42	Tang Jialin	China	49:15.7	4 (1+1+0+2)	+7:45.6
70	60	Luminița Pișcoran	Romania	49:18.3	4 (2+1+1+0)	+7:48.2
71	33	Svetlana Sleptsova	Russia	49:23.8	5 (2+1+1+1)	+7:53.7
72	36	Daniela Kadeva	Bulgaria	49:24.9	3 (0+0+1+2)	+7:54.8
73	63	Anna Kistanova	Kazakhstan	49:27.6	6 (1+2+2+1)	+7:57.5
74	3	Olga Poltoranina	Kazakhstan	49:30.6	4 (0+0+4+0)	+8:00.5
75	49	Rina Mitsuhashi	Japan	49:54.3	6 (2+2+1+1)	+8:24.2
76	29	Anja Eržen	Slovenia	50:12.7	3 (1+1+1+0)	+8:42.6
77	44	Diana Rasimovičiūtė	Lithuania	50:13.1	3 (1+2+0+0)	+8:43.0
78	47	Fabienne Hartweger	Austria	50:24.4	3 (1+2+0+0)	+8:54.3
79	62	Urška Poje	Slovenia	50:27.3	3 (1+1+1+0)	+8:57.2
80	71	Éva Tófalvi	Romania	50:28.5	3 (1+2+0+0)	+8:58.4
81	21	Victoria Padial	Spain	50:30.6	3 (1+2+0+0)	+9:00.5
82	40	Lucie Charvátová	Czech Republic	50:33.7	8 (2+2+3+1)	+9:03.6
83	67	Sanna Markkanen	Finland	50:39.4	3 (0+1+0+2)	+9:09.3
84	19	Anna Mąka	Poland	50:40.1	4 (2+2+0+0)	+9:10.0
85	17	Lena Häcki	Switzerland	50:43.7	7 (2+0+3+2)	+9:13.6
86	96	Natalija Paulauskaitė	Lithuania	50:59.0	3 (0+1+1+1)	+9:28.9
87	23	Madeleine Phaneuf	United States	51:08.4	4 (0+2+0+2)	+9:38.53
88	45	Desislava Stoyanova	Bulgaria	51:11.4	6 (1+2+2+1)	+9:41.3
89	39	Natalija Kočergina	Lithuania	51:55.5	7 (1+3+1+2)	+10:25.4
90	66	Kristel Viigipuu	Estonia	51:55.9	3 (0+0+0+3)	+10:25.8
91	85	Meng Fanqi	China	52:17.6	6 (4+1+1+0)	+10:47.5
92	28	Anastasiya Nychyporenko	Moldova	52:41.7	3 (0+0+0+3)	+11:11.6
93	37	Maria Tsakiri	Greece	52:50.9	3 (0+2+0+1)	+11:20.8
94	82	Mun Ji-hee	South Korea	53:21.7	4 (1+1+1+1)	+11:51.6
95	31	Žanna Juškāne	Latvia	53:43.4	7 (3+0+2+2)	+12:13.3
96	99	Kadri Lehtla	Estonia	53:58.7	5 (0+3+2+0)	+12:28.6
97	38	Diana Salman	Romania	55:35.7	7 (3+2+0+2)	+14:05.6
98	74	Emőke Szőcs	Hungary	56:11.7	9 (3+2+2+2)	+14:41.6
99	57	Alla Ghilenko	Moldova	58:29.6	8 (1+3+1+3)	+16:59.5
