= Biathlon World Championships 2015 – Women's individual =

Women's individual at the Biathlon World Championships 2015
- Venue: Kontiolahti, Finland
- Date: 11 March 2015
- Competitors: 101 from 30 nations
- Winning time: 41:32.2

Medalists
gold medal	Ekaterina Yurlova	Russia
silver medal	Gabriela Soukalová	Czech Republic
bronze medal	Kaisa Mäkäräinen	Finland

The Women's individual event of the Biathlon World Championships 2015 was held on 11 March 2015.

== Results ==
The race was started at 18:15 EET.

Rank	Bib	Name	Nationality	Time	Penalties (P+S+P+S)	Deficit
1st place, gold medalist(s)	93	Ekaterina Yurlova	Russia	41:32.2	0 (0+0+0+0)	
2nd place, silver medalist(s)	4	Gabriela Soukalová	Czech Republic	41:55.4	1 (0+0+0+1)	+23.2
3rd place, bronze medalist(s)	36	Kaisa Mäkäräinen	Finland	41:56.6	2 (0+1+1+0)	+24.4
4	12	Dorothea Wierer	Italy	41:57.0	1 (0+1+0+0)	+24.8
5	16	Daria Virolaynen	Russia	42:10.1	1 (0+0+1+0)	+37.9
6	21	Laura Dahlmeier	Germany	42:12.7	2 (1+1+0+0)	+40.5
7	1	Anaïs Bescond	France	42:37.9	1 (0+1+0+0)	+1:05.7
8	29	Veronika Vítková	Czech Republic	42:53.4	2 (0+0+1+1)	+1:21.2
9	78	Monika Hojnisz	Poland	42:54.2	1 (1+0+0+0)	+1:22.0
10	15	Franziska Hildebrand	Germany	43:54.7	2 (1+0+0+1)	+2:22.5
11	65	Federica Sanfilippo	Italy	44:09.7	1 (1+0+0+0)	+2:37.5
12	37	Susan Dunklee	United States	44:15.2	3 (2+0+0+1)	+2:43.0
13	53	Weronika Nowakowska-Ziemniak	Poland	44:17.8	2 (1+0+0+1)	+2:45.6
14	17	Krystyna Guzik	Poland	44:23.6	2 (0+1+0+1)	+2:51.4
15	20	Valj Semerenko	Ukraine	44:24.4	3 (2+0+0+1)	+2:52.2
16	28	Darya Domracheva	Belarus	44:26.8	4 (0+3+0+1)	+2:54.6
17	10	Karin Oberhofer	Italy	44:38.1	4 (0+0+1+3)	+3:05.9
18	39	Nadzeya Pisarava	Belarus	44:42.9	3 (0+2+0+1)	+3:10.7
19	99	Iryna Kryuko	Belarus	44:50.3	2 (0+1+1+0)	+3:18.1
20	18	Nadezhda Skardino	Belarus	44:54.5	3 (0+1+2+0)	+3:22.3
21	55	Megan Heinicke	Canada	44:55.5	1 (0+0+0+1)	+3:23.3
22	50	Elisa Gasparin	Switzerland	44:58.2	3 (0+1+2+0)	+3:26.0
23	88	Mona Brorsson	Sweden	45:07.2	1 (0+1+0+0)	+3:35.0
24	75	Eva Puskarčíková	Czech Republic	45:16.3	2 (0+1+0+1)	+3:44.1
25	76	Luise Kummer	Germany	45:28.1	2 (0+0+0+2)	+3:55.9
26	2	Lisa Hauser	Austria	45:30.3	2 (2+0+0+0)	+3:58.1
27	63	Yurie Tanaka	Japan	45:36.9	2 (0+2+0+0)	+4:04.7
28	73	Yuliya Zhuravok	Ukraine	45:42.9	1 (0+0+1+0)	+4:10.7
29	34	Emilia Yordanova	Bulgaria	45:50.0	1 (0+1+0+0)	+4:17.8
30	46	Dunja Zdouc	Austria	45:58.2	3 (1+0+1+1)	+4:26.0
31	81	Yana Romanova	Russia	46:01.1	3 (0+1+0+2)	+4:28.9
32	72	Elise Ringen	Norway	46:02.4	3 (1+0+0+2)	+4:30.2
33	5	Fuyuko Suzuki	Japan	46:08.6	4 (2+2+0+0)	+4:36.4
34	64	Justine Braisaz	France	46:10.1	4 (3+0+0+1)	+4:37.9
35	32	Nicole Gontier	Italy	46:13.9	4 (0+3+1+0)	+4:41.7
36	60	Iryna Varvynets	Ukraine	46:18.5	4 (1+1+0+2)	+4:46.3
37	100	Terézia Poliaková	Slovakia	46:22.9	3 (1+1+1+0)	+4:50.7
38	14	Juliya Dzhyma	Ukraine	46:24.9	4 (1+1+1+1)	+4:52.7
39	66	Gabrielė Leščinskaitė	Lithuania	46:27.4	2 (0+0+1+1)	+4:55.2
40	89	Alina Raikova	Kazakhstan	46:38.4	2 (1+1+0+0)	+5:06.2
41	94	Fanny Welle-Strand Horn	Norway	46:38.6	4 (0+2+1+1)	+5:06.4
42	52	Zhang Yan	China	46:42.9	4 (0+2+1+1)	+5:10.6
43	96	Enora Latuilliere	France	46:45.0	2 (1+0+0+1)	+5:12.8
44	48	Vanessa Hinz	Germany	46:52.6	5 (0+2+2+1)	+5:20.4
45	80	Martina Chrapánová	Slovakia	46:53.2	3 (0+1+1+1)	+5:21.0
46	56	Synnøve Solemdal	Norway	46:55.3	4 (0+1+2+1)	+5:23.1
47	3	Annelies Cook	United States	46:59.0	4 (0+0+0+4)	+5:26.8
48	82	Sanna Markkanen	Finland	46:59.3	2 (0+1+0+1)	+5:27.1
49	44	Olga Podchufarova	Russia	47:13.9	4 (2+0+0+2)	+5:41.7
50	70	Olga Poltoranina	Kazakhstan	47:16.8	3 (2+1+0+0)	+5:44.6
51	97	Clare Egan	United States	47:17.9	4 (0+0+2+2)	+5:45.7
52	105	Tiril Eckhoff	Norway	47:18.1	6 (3+0+0+3)	+5:45.9
53	24	Paulína Fialková	Slovakia	47:24.5	5 (1+3+1+0)	+5:52.3
54	101	Julia Schwaiger	Austria	47:26.9	3 (0+1+1+1)	+5:54.7
55	51	Coline Varcin	France	47:31.8	3 (1+1+1+0)	+5:59.6
56	92	Magdalena Gwizdoń	Poland	47:39.7	5 (0+2+0+3)	+6:07.5
57	30	Darya Usanova	Kazakhstan	47:43.0	5 (3+1+1+0)	+6:10.8
58	62	Daria Yurlova	Estonia	47:45.7	4 (2+1+1+0)	+6:13.5
59	27	Tang Jialin	China	47:51.5	4 (0+2+2+1)	+6:19.3
60	54	Kadri Lehtla	Estonia	47:57.7	5 (2+1+1+1)	+6:25.3
61	83	Andreja Mali	Slovenia	48:01.1	4 (1+1+2+0)	+6:28.9
62	86	Urška Poje	Slovenia	48:02.1	3 (0+1+1+1)	+6:29.9
63	79	Katharina Innerhofer	Austria	48:08.2	4 (1+1+1+1)	+6:36.0
64	33	Jana Gereková	Slovakia	48:10.9	6 (3+2+1+0)	+6:38.7
65	41	Mari Laukkanen	Finland	48:15.7	5 (1+0+3+1)	+6:43.5
66	47	Amanda Lightfoot	Great Britain	48:21.8	5 (1+2+1+1)	+6:45.9
67	69	Hannah Dreissigacker	United States	48:21.9	5 (2+1+1+1)	+6:49.7
68	67	Nastassia Dubarezava	Belarus	48:22.7	6 (0+1+3+2)	+6:50.5
69	6	Victoria Padial	Spain	48:31.5	3 (0+1+1+1)	+6:59.3
70	7	Johanna Talihaerm	Estonia	48:33.5	4 (0+2+1+1)	+7:01.3
71	35	Emma Nilsson	Sweden	48:44.7	3 (0+1+1+1)	+7:12.5
72	23	Anna Magnusson	Sweden	48:50.2	3 (1+1+1+0)	+7:18.0
73	42	Éva Tófalvi	Romania	48:55.8	6 (1+3+0+2)	+7:23.6
74	19	Réka Ferencz	Romania	48:56.7	2 (0+2+0+0)	+7:24.5
75	57	Jitka Landová	Czech Republic	48:57.8	6 (1+2+2+1)	+7:25.6
76	25	Mun Ji-hee	South Korea	49:10.2	5 (1+1+2+1)	+7:38.0
77	59	Anna Kistanova	Kazakhstan	49:11.6	6 (0+2+2+2)	+7:39.4
78	84	Aita Gasparin	Switzerland	49:28.7	5 (0+1+0+4)	+7:56.5
79	71	Audrey Vaillancourt	Canada	49:37.5	5 (2+0+1+2)	+8:05.3
80	11	Eevamari Rauhamäki	Finland	49:42.6	3 (0+1+0+2)	+8:10.4
81	85	Elisabeth Högberg	Sweden	49:44.5	6 (1+2+2+1)	+8:12.3
82	91	Natalija Paulauskaitė	Lithuania	49:45.4	4 (0+2+1+1)	+8:13.2
83	98	Kristel Viigipuu	Estonia	49:49.4	4 (1+1+1+1)	+8:17.2
84	95	Julia Ransom	Canada	49:56.1	5 (2+1+1+1)	+8:23.9
85	9	Lena Häcki	Switzerland	50:12.1	8 (2+3+2+1)	+8:39.9
86	68	Stefani Popova	Bulgaria	50:35.2	3 (1+2+0+0)	+9:03.0
87	22	Rosanna Crawford	Canada	50:37.3	8 (2+2+2+2)	+9:05.1
88	49	Anja Eržen	Slovenia	50:42.6	7 (1+3+1+2)	+9:10.4
89	77	Luminița Pișcoran	Romania	50:54.2	7 (1+3+2+1)	+9:22.0
90	40	Natalija Kočergina	Lithuania	51:10.9	8 (2+2+3+1)	+9:38.7
91	38	Emőke Szőcs	Hungary	51:21.2	6 (1+3+0+2)	+9:49.0
92	58	Baiba Bendika	Latvia	51:36.7	6 (1+2+2+1)	+10:04.5
93	90	Wang Yue	China	51:39.3	6 (1+2+2+1)	+10:07.1
94	104	Florina Ioana Cîrstea	Romania	52:41.8	5 (1+1+0+3)	+11:09.6
95	43	Miki Kobayashi	Japan	52:58.5	9 (2+3+0+4)	+11:26.3
96	13	Chardine Sloof	Netherlands	53:06.1	3 (1+0+1+1)	+11:33.9
97	102	Katsura Sato	Japan	53:49.6	7 (2+1+2+2)	+12:17.4
98	31	Desislava Stoyanova	Bulgaria	53:53.3	10 (3+1+4+2)	+12:23.1
99	26	Nerys Jones	Great Britain	54:49.1	10 (2+3+3+2)	+13:16.9
100	87	Kim Kyung-nam	South Korea	55:50.2	5 (0+2+2+1)	+14:18.0
	8	Diana Rasimovičiūtė-Brice	Lithuania	DNF		
	45	Kim Seon-su	South Korea	DNS		
	61	Park Ji-ae	South Korea	DNS		
	74	Song Chaoqing	China	DNS		
	103	Flurina Volken	Switzerland	DNS		
