= Biathlon World Championships 2016 – Women's individual =

Women's individual at the Biathlon World Championships 2016
- Venue: Oslo, Norway
- Date: 9 March
- Competitors: 94 from 29 nations
- Winning time: 44:02.8

Medalists
gold medal	Marie Dorin Habert	France
silver medal	Anaïs Bescond	France
bronze medal	Laura Dahlmeier	Germany

The Women's individual event of the Biathlon World Championships 2016 was held on 9 March 2016.

== Results ==
The race was started at 13:00 CET.

Rank	Bib	Name	Nationality	Time	Penalties (P+S+P+S)	Deficit
1st place, gold medalist(s)	52	Marie Dorin Habert	France	44:02.8	1 (0+0+0+1)	
2nd place, silver medalist(s)	50	Anaïs Bescond	France	44:15.0	1 (0+0+0+1)	+12.2
3rd place, bronze medalist(s)	36	Laura Dahlmeier	Germany	45:20.6	2 (1+0+1+0)	+1:17.8
4	53	Veronika Vítková	Czech Republic	45:29.6	1 (0+1+0+0)	+1:26.8
5	48	Gabriela Soukalová	Czech Republic	45:39.6	2 (1+0+0+1)	+1:36.8
6	55	Franziska Hildebrand	Germany	45:40.5	1 (1+0+0+0)	+1:37.7
7	44	Krystyna Guzik	Poland	45:42.2	1 (0+0+1+0)	+1:39.4
8	28	Dorothea Wierer	Italy	45:46.1	2 (1+1+0+0)	+1:43.3
9	72	Iryna Varvynets	Ukraine	45:59.1	1 (0+0+0+1)	+1:56.3
10	21	Alexia Runggaldier	Italy	46:00.3	1 (1+0+0+0)	+1:57.5
11	41	Ekaterina Yurlova	Russia	46:01.3	1 (0+0+0+1)	+1:58.5
12	90	Magdalena Gwizdoń	Poland	46:12.1	1 (0+0+0+1)	+2:09.3
13	29	Lisa Hauser	Austria	46:15.5	1 (1+0+0+0)	+2:12.7
14	75	Rosanna Crawford	Canada	46:18.1	1 (0+0+1+0)	+2:15.3
15	40	Nadezhda Skardino	Belarus	46:27.1	1 (0+0+0+1)	+2:24.3
16	19	Justine Braisaz	France	46:30.3	2 (0+2+0+0)	+2:27.2
17	49	Selina Gasparin	Switzerland	46:31.8	2 (1+1+0+0)	+2:29.0
18	46	Susan Dunklee	United States	46:32.3	3 (1+1+1+0)	+2:29.5
19	26	Kaisa Mäkäräinen	Finland	46:34.3	3 (1+1+1+0)	+2:31.5
20	31	Julia Ransom	Canada	46:36.3	0 (0+0+0+0)	+2:33.5
21	14	Fuyuko Tachizaki	Japan	46:37.0	2 (0+1+1+0)	+2:34.2
22	33	Juliya Dzhyma	Ukraine	46:47.5	2 (0+0+1+1)	+2:44.7
23	54	Teja Gregorin	Slovenia	46:49.2	1 (0+1+0+0)	+2:46.4
24	58	Galina Vishnevskaya	Kazakhstan	46:57.1	1 (0+1+0+0)	+2:54.3
25	94	Anastasia Zagoruiko	Russia	47:14.9	2 (1+0+0+1)	+3:12.1
26	39	Karin Oberhofer	Italy	47:15.3	3 (1+1+0+1)	+3:12.5
27	64	Maren Hammerschmidt	Germany	47:25.2	3 (0+1+2+0)	+3:22.4
28	71	Anaïs Chevalier	France	47:27.5	3 (0+1+1+1)	+3:24.7
29	38	Mona Brorsson	Sweden	47:37.6	1 (0+0+0+1)	+3:34.8
30	10	Tang Jialin	China	47:39.5	1 (0+0+1+0)	+3:36.7
31	62	Fanny Horn Birkeland	Norway	47:40.7	4 (2+2+0+0)	+3:37.9
32	68	Ingela Andersson	Sweden	47:46.7	2 (0+0+1+1)	+3:43.9
33	74	Hannah Dreissigacker	United States	47:48.0	2 (1+0+0+1)	+3:45.2
34	2	Nastassia Dubarezava	Belarus	47:50.8	2 (1+1+0+0)	+3:48.0
35	79	Ekaterina Shumilova	Russia	47:53.1	2 (1+1+0+0)	+3:50.3
36	5	Linn Persson	Sweden	47:54.1	2 (0+0+0+2)	+3:51.3
37	3	Vanessa Hinz	Germany	47:56.9	3 (0+2+0+1)	+3:54.1
38	56	Jana Gereková	Slovakia	47:57.2	3 (0+1+0+2)	+3:54.4
39	18	Tatiana Akimova	Russia	47:59.7	3 (0+1+1+1)	+3:56.9
40	82	Monika Hojnisz	Poland	48:01.9	3 (0+0+1+2)	+3:59.1
41	20	Weronika Nowakowska-Ziemniak	Poland	48:17.8	2 (0+1+0+1)	+4:15.0
42	59	Marte Olsbu	Norway	48:18.2	5 (0+3+0+2)	+4:15.4
43	43	Tiril Eckhoff	Norway	48:30.9	5 (2+2+0+1)	+4:28.1
44	93	Valj Semerenko	Ukraine	48:39.3	2 (0+1+0+1)	+4:36.5
45	22	Lucie Charvátová	Czech Republic	48:47.3	4 (0+1+1+2)	+4:44.5
46	15	Meril Beilmann	Estonia	48:48.3	0 (0+0+0+0)	+4:45.5
47	34	Zhang Yan	China	49:01.2	2 (0+0+0+2)	+4:58.4
48	30	Amanda Lightfoot	Great Britain	49:03.6	2 (0+1+0+1)	+5:00.8
49	37	Daria Virolaynen	Russia	49:10.2	4 (0+4+0+0)	+5:07.4
50	60	Julia Schwaiger	Austria	49:17.0	2 (1+1+0+0)	+5:14.2
51	12	Darya Usanova	Kazakhstan	49:21.9	4 (1+1+1+1)	+5:19.1
52	4	Dunja Zdouc	Austria	49:23.7	2 (1+0+1+0)	+5:20.9
53	35	Emilia Yordanova	Bulgaria	49:23.9	2 (1+0+1+0)	+5:21.1
54	92	Zina Kocher	Canada	49:36.4	4 (1+1+2+0)	+5:33.6
55	11	Desislava Stoyanova	Bulgaria	49:49.3	3 (0+1+2+0)	+5:46.5
56	86	Emma Nilsson	Sweden	49:51.6	3 (0+2+1+0)	+5:48.8
57	73	Rina Suzuki	Japan	49:54.8	1 (0+0+0+1)	+5:52.0
58	83	Federica Sanfilippo	Italy	49:57.5	5 (1+3+0+1)	+5:54.7
59	78	Andreja Mali	Slovenia	49:59.3	2 (1+1+0+0)	+5:56.5
60	7	Sarah Beaudry	Canada	50:05.1	2 (1+1+0+0)	+6:02.3
61	89	Darya Yurkevich	Belarus	50:07.1	4 (1+1+0+2)	+6:04.3
62	17	Anja Eržen	Slovenia	50:09.2	4 (0+2+1+1)	+6:06.4
63	85	Aita Gasparin	Switzerland	50:16.3	4 (1+2+0+1)	+6:13.5
64	67	Iryna Kryuko	Belarus	50:28.6	5 (1+1+1+2)	+6:25.8
65	27	Baiba Bendika	Latvia	50:41.7	4 (1+1+1+1)	+6:38.9
66	16	Clare Egan	United States	50:44.7	4 (0+3+0+1)	+6:41.9
67	65	Lena Häcki	Switzerland	50:47.9	6 (1+3+0+2)	+6:45.1
68	24	Éva Tófalvi	Romania	51:02.5	3 (1+2+0+0)	+6:59.7
69	42	Yurie Tanaka	Japan	51:06.0	3 (1+1+1+0)	+7:03.2
70	9	Mun Ji-hee	South Korea	51:26.4	4 (0+0+0+4)	+7:23.6
71	81	Laura Toivanen	Finland	51:45.1	4 (2+1+1+0)	+7:42.3
72	77	Alina Raikova	Kazakhstan	51:47.9	4 (0+2+1+1)	+7:45.1
73	13	Kaia Wøien Nicolaisen	Norway	52:25.6	5 (1+1+3+0)	+8:22.8
74	6	Irene Cadurisch	Switzerland	52:29.6	4 (1+2+0+1)	+8:36.8
75	87	Susanna Kurzthaler	Austria	52:48.7	4 (0+2+0+2)	+8:45.9
76	23	Paulína Fialková	Slovakia	52:50.1	7 (3+1+2+1)	+8:47.3
77	88	Annelies Cook	United States	52:52.2	7 (4+2+1+0)	+8:49.4
78	69	Gabrielė Leščinskaitė	Lithuania	52:52.5	3 (0+1+2+0)	+8:49.7
79	80	Ivona Fialková	Slovakia	52:57.1	7 (1+4+1+1)	+8:54.3
80	63	Stefani Popova	Bulgaria	53:11.2	7 (4+2+1+0)	+9:08.4
81	91	Martina Chrapánová	Slovakia	53:23.8	3 (0+1+2+0)	+9:21.0
82	51	Victoria Padial	Spain	53:41.5	7 (1+4+1+1)	+9:38.7
83	25	Natalija Paulauskaitė	Lithuania	53:56.8	5 (1+1+2+1)	+9:54.0
84	57	Sanna Markkanen	Finland	54:02.9	5 (0+0+2+3)	+10:00.1
85	66	Wang Xuelan	China	54:10.6	6 (2+2+0+2)	+10:07.8
86	76	Žanna Juškāne	Latvia	54:14.7	5 (1+2+1+1)	+10:11.9
87	8	Natalija Kočergina	Lithuania	54:16.1	7 (2+0+1+4)	+10:13.3
88	1	Emőke Szőcs	Hungary	54:39.5	6 (2+1+2+1)	+10:36.7
89	32	Luminița Pișcoran	Romania	54:44.2	7 (2+3+0+2)	+10:41.4
90	61	Réka Forika	Romania	55:23.8	4 (0+2+1+1)	+11:21.0
91	47	Hwang Hye-suk	South Korea	58:44.4	6 (1+3+0+2)	+14:41.6
—	45	Grete Gaim	Estonia	DNF		
—	70	Kim Seon-su	South Korea	DNF		
—	85	Olena Pidhrushna	Ukraine	DNF		
