= Biathlon World Championships 2016 – Women's sprint =

Athletic event

Women's sprint at the Biathlon World Championships 2016
- Venue: Oslo, Norway
- Date: 5 March
- Competitors: 96 from 29 nations
- Winning time: 21:10.8

Medalists
gold medal	Tiril Eckhoff	Norway
silver medal	Marie Dorin Habert	France
bronze medal	Laura Dahlmeier	Germany

The Women's sprint event of the Biathlon World Championships 2016 was held on 5 March 2016.

== Results ==
The race was started at 14:30 CET.

Rank	Bib	Name	Nationality	Time	Penalties (P+S)	Deficit
1st place, gold medalist(s)	42	Tiril Eckhoff	Norway	21:10.8	0 (0+0)	
2nd place, silver medalist(s)	20	Marie Dorin Habert	France	21:25.8	0 (0+0)	+15.0
3rd place, bronze medalist(s)	48	Laura Dahlmeier	Germany	21:30.6	1 (1+0)	+19.8
4	33	Gabriela Soukalová	Czech Republic	21:48.6	1 (1+0)	+37.8
5	31	Dorothea Wierer	Italy	21:49.0	0 (0+0)	+38.2
6	32	Mona Brorsson	Sweden	21:54.7	0 (0+0)	+43.9
7	51	Veronika Vítková	Czech Republic	21:56.8	0 (0+0)	+46.0
8	19	Susan Dunklee	United States	21:59.0	1 (0+1)	+48.2
9	10	Kaisa Mäkäräinen	Finland	21:59.3	1 (0+1)	+48.5
10	11	Franziska Hildebrand	Germany	22:01.7	0 (0+0)	+50.9
11	69	Marte Olsbu	Norway	22:03.6	2 (1+1)	+52.8
12	22	Anaïs Bescond	France	22:04.9	1 (1+0)	+54.1
13	71	Iryna Varvynets	Ukraine	22:05.8	0 (0+0)	+55.0
14	49	Franziska Preuß	Germany	22:15.9	1 (1+0)	+1:05.1
15	30	Tang Jialin	China	22:17.9	0 (0+0)	+1:07.1
16	52	Olena Pidhrushna	Ukraine	22:19.1	1 (0+1)	+1:08.3
16	56	Lisa Hauser	Austria	22:19.1	1 (1+0)	+1:08.3
18	82	Hannah Dreissigacker	United States	22:28.8	0 (0+0)	+1:18.0
19	46	Ekaterina Yurlova	Russia	22:30.7	1 (0+1)	+1:19.9
20	79	Lisa Vittozzi	Italy	22:30.8	1 (0+1)	+1:20.0
21	90	Lena Häcki	Switzerland	22:33.3	1 (0+1)	+1:22.5
22	76	Ingela Andersson	Sweden	22:34.3	0 (0+0)	+1:23.5
23	68	Nastassia Dubarezava	Belarus	22:37.1	1 (0+1)	+1:26.3
24	43	Galina Vishnevskaya	Kazakhstan	22:37.4	1 (0+1)	+1:26.6
25	77	Justine Braisaz	France	22:37.9	1 (0+1)	+1:27.1
26	93	Anaïs Chevalier	France	22:38.9	1 (0+1)	+1:28.1
27	15	Darya Usanova	Kazakhstan	22:39.0	1 (0+1)	+1:28.2
28	14	Tatiana Akimova	Russia	22:40.0	1 (0+1)	+1:29.2
29	35	Rosanna Crawford	Canada	22:44.8	1 (1+0)	+1:34.0
30	16	Teja Gregorin	Slovenia	22:46.1	0 (0+0)	+1:35.3
31	59	Yuliia Dzhima	Ukraine	22:46.4	2 (1+1)	+1:35.6
32	54	Nadezhda Skardino	Belarus	22:50.5	1 (1+0)	+1:39.7
33	75	Lucie Charvátová	Czech Republic	22:54.7	3 (1+2)	+1:43.9
34	58	Linn Persson	Sweden	22:55.7	2 (1+1)	+1:44.9
34	91	Synnøve Solemdal	Norway	22:55.7	1 (1+0)	+1:44.9
36	24	Karin Oberhofer	Italy	22:56.2	2 (0+2)	+1:45.4
37	85	Susanne Hoffmann	Austria	23:01.2	0 (0+0)	+1:50.4
38	78	Daria Virolaynen	Russia	23:01.3	2 (0+2)	+1:50.5
39	88	Terézia Poliaková	Slovakia	23:03.6	0 (0+0)	+1:52.8
40	25	Jana Gereková	Slovakia	23:05.7	2 (0+2)	+1:54.9
41	95	Jessica Jislová	Czech Republic	23:06.9	0 (0+0)	+1:56.1
42	2	Fanny Horn Birkeland	Norway	23:07.8	3 (1+2)	+1:57.0
43	63	Ivona Fialková	Slovakia	23:09.5	2 (1+1)	+1:58.7
44	50	Monika Hojnisz	Poland	23:10.1	2 (1+1)	+1:59.3
45	38	Zhang Yan	China	23:14.4	1 (1+0)	+2:03.6
46	83	Irene Cadurisch	Switzerland	23:15.7	1 (0+1)	+2:04.9
47	1	Fuyuko Tachizaki	Japan	23:19.6	2 (2+0)	+2:08.8
47	81	Emilia Yordanova	Bulgaria	23:19.6	0 (0+0)	+2:08.8
49	57	Paulina Fialková	Slovakia	23:24.5	3 (1+2)	+2:13.7
50	23	Julia Ransom	Canada	23:25.4	1 (0+1)	+2:14.6
50	44	Federica Sanfilippo	Italy	23:25.4	3 (0+3)	+2:14.6
52	27	Mari Laukkanen	Finland	23:26.8	1 (1+0)	+2:16.0
53	89	Anna Magnusson	Sweden	23:27.4	1 (1+0)	+2:16.6
54	80	Anja Eržen	Slovenia	23:28.3	2 (0+2)	+2:17.5
55	8	Magdalena Gwizdoń	Poland	23:29.4	3 (3+0)	+2:18.6
56	28	Desislava Stoyanova	Bulgaria	23:32.0	2 (1+1)	+2:21.2
57	74	Éva Tófalvi	Romania	23:34.2	2 (1+1)	+2:23.4
58	66	Dunja Zdouc	Austria	23:35.7	2 (1+1)	+2:24.9
59	45	Andreja Mali	Slovenia	23:35.8	1 (0+1)	+2:25.0
60	9	Krystyna Guzik	Poland	23:38.0	3 (1+2)	+2:27.2
61	17	Vanessa Hinz	Germany	23:40.4	4 (2+2)	+2:29.6
62	13	Meril Beilmann	Estonia	23:41.1	0 (0+0)	+2:30.3
63	96	Annelies Cook	United States	23:42.8	1 (0+1)	+2:32.0
64	53	Celia Aymonier	France	23:43.7	4 (1+3)	+2:32.9
65	18	Olga Podchufarova	Russia	23:47.1	2 (0+2)	+2:36.3
66	26	Iryna Kryuko	Belarus	23:47.3	2 (0+2)	+2:36.5
67	6	Selina Gasparin	Switzerland	23:48.3	3 (2+1)	+2:37.5
68	67	Anna Kistanova	Kazakhstan	23:54.0	3 (2+1)	+2:43.2
69	84	Natalija Paulauskaitė	Lithuania	23:55.2	1 (1+0)	+2:44.4
70	37	Emőke Szőcs	Hungary	24:08.8	1 (0+1)	+2:58.0
71	87	Sarah Beaudry	Canada	24:09.6	2 (0+2)	+2:58.8
72	60	Luminița Pișcoran	Romania	24:10.6	2 (1+1)	+2:59.8
73	34	Aita Gasparin	Switzerland	24:13.2	3 (2+1)	+3:02.4
74	41	Kadri Lehtla	Estonia	24:15.7	1 (0+1)	+3:04.9
75	65	Weronika Nowakowska-Ziemniak	Poland	24:29.5	4 (2+2)	+3:18.7
76	72	Wang Xuelan	China	24:30.9	3 (1+2)	+3:20.1
77	92	Hanna Sola	Belarus	24:31.0	3 (1+2)	+3:20.2
78	3	Baiba Bendika	Latvia	24:32.8	3 (2+1)	+3:22.0
78	61	Yurie Tanaka	Japan	24:32.8	3 (1+2)	+3:22.0
80	12	Valj Semerenko	Ukraine	24:35.7	4 (2+2)	+3:24.9
81	7	Amanda Lightfoot	Great Britain	24:38.6	3 (1+2)	+3:27.8
82	64	Zina Kocher	Canada	24:38.8	5 (2+3)	+3:28.0
83	62	Rina Suzuki	Japan	24:56.4	2 (0+2)	+3:45.6
84	47	Clare Egan	United States	24:58.3	1 (0+1)	+3:47.5
85	73	Hwang Hye-suk	South Korea	25:02.6	0 (0+0)	+3:51.8
86	29	Christina Rieder	Austria	25:05.4	2 (2+0)	+3:54.6
87	36	Natalija Kočergina	Lithuania	25:05.9	5 (2+3)	+3:55.1
88	21	Mun Ji-hee	South Korea	25:11.3	3 (1+2)	+4:00.5
89	70	Grete Gaim	Estonia	25:12.0	2 (1+1)	+4:01.2
90	5	Victoria Padial	Spain	25:21.1	2 (1+1)	+4:10.3
91	4	Gabrielė Leščinskaitė	Lithuania	25:30.2	2 (1+1)	+4:19.4
92	55	Ko Eun-jung	South Korea	26:14.8	4 (2+2)	+5:04.0
93	86	Florina Cîrstea	Romania	26:16.0	4 (1+3)	+5:05.2
94	39	Sanna Markkanen	Finland	26:19.7	4 (2+2)	+5:08.9
95	40	Žanna Juškāne	Latvia	26:47.6	4 (3+1)	+5:36.8
96	94	Stefani Popova	Bulgaria	27:23.7	6 (3+3)	+6:12.9
