= Ivona Fialková =

Slovak biathlete (born 1994)

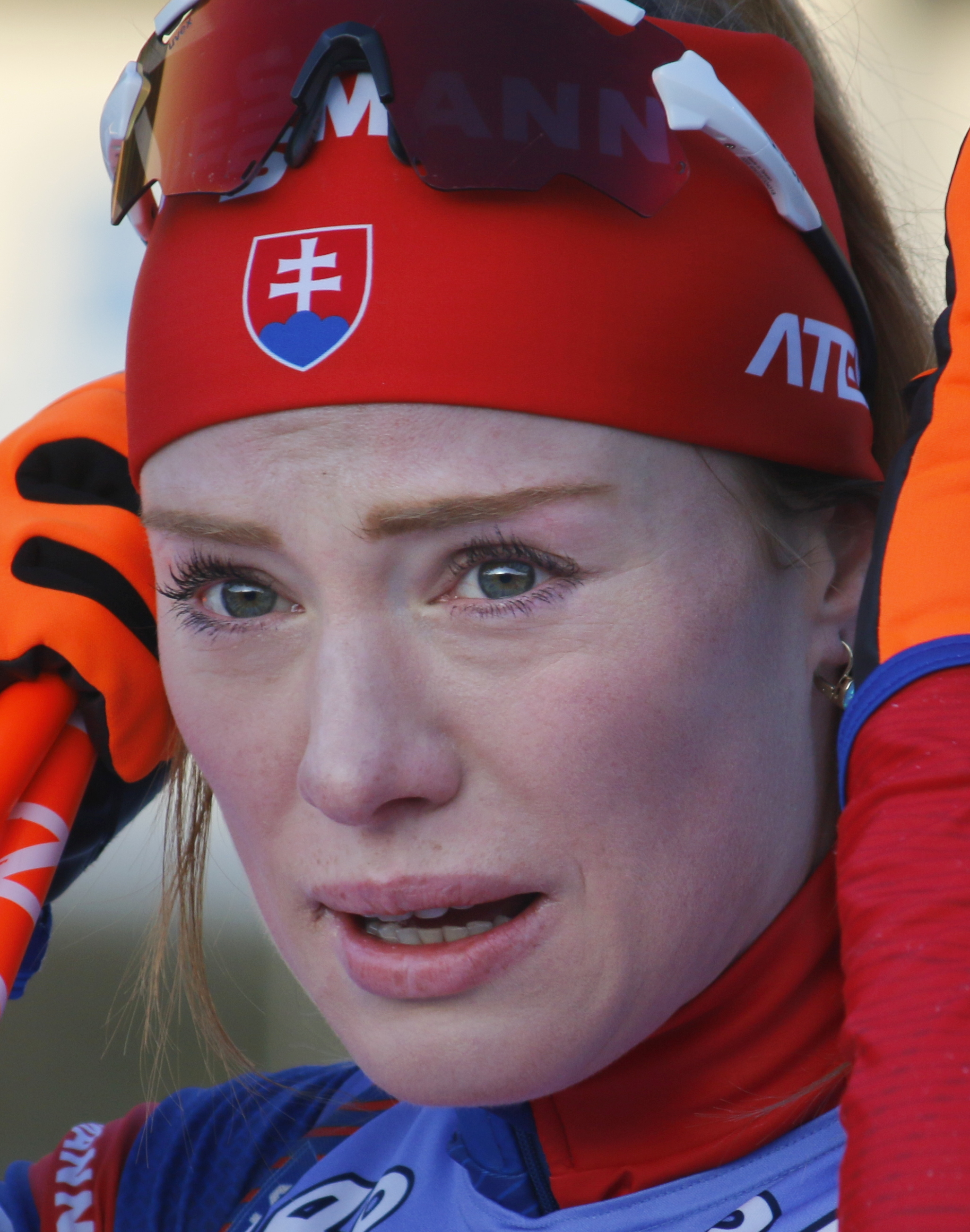
- Fialková in 2023

Personal information
- Born: 22 November 1994 (age 31) Brezno, Slovakia

Sport

Professional information
- Sport: Biathlon
- Club: Dukla Banská Bystrica
- Skis: Fischer
- World Cup debut: 2013

Olympic Games
- Teams: 2 (2018, 2022)
- Medals: 0 (0 gold)

World Championships
- Teams: 6 (2016, 2017, 2019, 2020, 2021, 2023)
- Medals: 0 (0 gold)
Medal record
Women's biathlon
Representing Slovakia

Ivona Fialková (born 22 November 1994) is a former Slovak biathlete. She was born in Brezno. She has competed in the Biathlon World Cup, and represented Slovakia at the Biathlon World Championships 2016. Her older sister Paulína Fialková is also Slovak biathlete. She retired at the end of the 2022/23 season.

== Biathlon results ==
All results are sourced from the International Biathlon Union.

=== Olympic Games ===
0 medals

| Event | Individual | Sprint | Pursuit | Mass start | Relay | Mixed relay |
|---|---|---|---|---|---|---|
| (South Korea) 2018 PyeongChang | 64th | 74th | — | — | 5th | — |
| (China) 2022 Beijing | 46th | 41st | 36th | — | 19th | 17th |

=== World Championships ===
0 medals

| Event | Individual | Sprint | Pursuit | Mass start | Relay | Mixed relay | Single mixed relay |
|---|---|---|---|---|---|---|---|
| (Norway) 2016 Oslo | 78th | 43rd | 53rd | — | 14th | — | —N/a |
| (Austria) 2017 Hochfilzen | 66th | — | — | — | 8th | — | —N/a |
| (Sweden) 2019 Östersund | 70th | 33rd | 37th | — | 6th | 12th | — |
| (Italy) 2020 Antholz-Anterselva | 40th | 9th | 6th | 25th | 17th | — | — |
| (Slovenia) 2021 Pokljuka | 79th | 65th | — | — | 21st | 18th | — |
| (Germany) 2023 Oberhof | 65th | 47th | 44th | — | — | — | — |

*During Olympic seasons competitions are only held for those events not included in the Olympic program.
**The single mixed relay was added as an event in 2019.

=== World Cup ===
| Season | Age | Overall | | | Sprint | | | Pursuit | | | Individual | | | Mass start | | |
| Season | Age | Races | Points | Position | Races | Points | Position | Races | Points | Position | Races | Points | Position | Races | Points | Position |
|---|---|---|---|---|---|---|---|---|---|---|---|---|---|---|---|---|
| 2016/17 | 22 | 13/26 | 54 | 66th | 7/9 | 36 | 56th | 4/9 | 18 | 66th | 2/3 | — | — | 0/5 | — | — |
| 2017/18 | 23 | 13/22 | 65 | 60th | 7/8 | 63 | 44th | 3/7 | — | — | 2/2 | — | — | 1/5 | 2 | 51st |
| 2018/19 | 24 | 15/25 | 52 | 69th | 8/9 | 26 | 64th | 5/8 | 12 | 72nd | 2/3 | 14 | 53rd | 0/5 | — | — |
| 2019/20 | 25 | 16/21 | 128 | 44th | 8/8 | 77 | 36th | 4/5 | 38 | 38th | 3/3 | 1 | 66th | 1/5 | 12 | 43rd |
| 2020/21 | 26 | 13/26 | 58 | 61st | 7/10 | 21 | 67th | 5/8 | 37 | 49th | 1/3 | — | — | 0/5 | — | — |
| 2021/22 | 27 | 7/9 | 45 | 42nd | 4/4 | — | — | 1/3 | 25 | 35th | 1/1 | — | — | 1/1 | 20 | 21st |
