= Biathlon World Championships 2017 – Women's sprint =

World Championship event

Women's sprint at the Biathlon World Championships 2017
- Location: Hochfilzen, Austria
- Dates: 10 February
- Competitors: 101 from 32 nations
- Winning time: 19:12.6

Medalists
gold medal	Gabriela Koukalová	Czech Republic
silver medal	Laura Dahlmeier	Germany
bronze medal	Anaïs Chevalier	France

The Women's sprint competition at the 2017 World Championships was held on 10 February 2017.

== Results ==
The race was started at 14:45.

Rank	Bib	Name	Nationality	Time	Penalties (P+S)	Deficit
1st place, gold medalist(s)	96	Gabriela Koukalová	Czech Republic	19:12.6	0 (0+0)	
2nd place, silver medalist(s)	64	Laura Dahlmeier	Germany	19:16.6	0 (0+0)	+4.0
3rd place, bronze medalist(s)	17	Anaïs Chevalier	France	19:37.7	0 (0+0)	+25.1
4	66	Lisa Vittozzi	Italy	19:37.9	0 (0+0)	+25.3
5	20	Federica Sanfilippo	Italy	19:44.5	0 (0+0)	+31.9
6	59	Vanessa Hinz	Germany	19:50.5	0 (0+0)	+37.9
7	1	Marie Dorin Habert	France	19:55.4	1 (1+0)	+42.8
8	2	Anastasiya Kuzmina	Slovakia	19:56.6	1 (0+1)	+44.0
9	48	Célia Aymonier	France	20:06.5	1 (0+1)	+53.9
10	23	Anastasiya Merkushyna	Ukraine	20:07.9	0 (0+0)	+55.3
11	14	Selina Gasparin	Switzerland	20:08.9	1 (1+0)	+56.3
12	4	Kaisa Mäkäräinen	Finland	20:09.1	2 (2+0)	+56.5
13	101	Tiril Eckhoff	Norway	20:13.9	2 (1+1)	+1:01.3
14	71	Anna Magnusson	Sweden	20:15.9	0 (0+0)	+1:03.3
15	10	Irina Uslugina	Russia	20:16.2	0 (0+0)	+1:03.6
16	43	Tatiana Akimova	Russia	20:18.2	1 (0+1)	+1:05.6
17	90	Eva Puskarčíková	Czech Republic	20:21.9	2 (2+0)	+1:09.3
18	18	Anna Frolina	South Korea	20:23.8	1 (1+0)	+1:11.2
19	61	Franziska Hildebrand	Germany	20:24.7	1 (1+0)	+1:12.1
20	68	Clare Egan	United States	20:25.0	0 (0+0)	+1:12.4
21	6	Dorothea Wierer	Italy	20:26.8	2 (2+0)	+1:14.2
22	15	Yuliia Dzhima	Ukraine	20:28.8	2 (1+1)	+1:16.2
23	76	Lisa Hauser	Austria	20:29.5	1 (1+0)	+1:16.9
24	98	Irina Starykh	Russia	20:30.7	1 (0+1)	+1:18.1
25	75	Nadezhda Skardino	Belarus	20:31.6	0 (0+0)	+1:19.0
26	12	Rosanna Crawford	Canada	20:35.8	1 (0+1)	+1:23.2
27	36	Darya Domracheva	Belarus	20:38.2	3 (0+3)	+1:25.6
28	11	Justine Braisaz	France	20:38.4	3 (2+1)	+1:25.8
29	3	Susan Dunklee	United States	20:40.0	3 (1+2)	+1:27.4
30	100	Teja Gregorin	Slovenia	20:42.3	3 (2+1)	+1:29.7
31	80	Paulína Fialková	Slovakia	20:45.4	2 (2+0)	+1:32.8
32	56	Lucie Charvátová	Czech Republic	20:46.4	2 (1+1)	+1:33.8
33	69	Svetlana Sleptsova	Russia	20:52.3	1 (0+1)	+1:39.7
34	53	Olena Pidhrushna	Ukraine	20:52.6	2 (2+0)	+1:40.0
35	28	Lena Häcki	Switzerland	20:52.7	2 (1+1)	+1:40.1
36	8	Iryna Kryuko	Belarus	20:53.5	1 (0+1)	+1:40.9
37	54	Olga Poltoranina	Kazakhstan	20:54.0	0 (0+0)	+1:41.4
38	42	Magdalena Gwizdoń	Poland	20:56.4	2 (0+2)	+1:43.8
39	9	Monika Hojnisz	Poland	20:57.5	2 (1+1)	+1:44.9
40	85	Hanna Öberg	Sweden	20:58.4	3 (1+2)	+1:45.8
41	77	Anna Kistanova	Kazakhstan	21:00.3	1 (1+0)	+1:47.7
42	81	Emilia Yordanova	Bulgaria	21:01.1	0 (0+0)	+1:48.5
43	32	Alexia Runggaldier	Italy	21:02.4	2 (1+1)	+1:49.8
44	16	Chardine Sloof	Sweden	21:02.8	0 (0+0)	+1:50.2
45	21	Kaia Wøien Nicolaisen	Norway	21:03.2	1 (0+1)	+1:50.6
46	95	Nadine Horchler	Germany	21:04.6	1 (0+1)	+1:52.0
47	65	Dunja Zdouc	Austria	21:08.3	1 (0+1)	+1:55.7
48	83	Aita Gasparin	Switzerland	21:09.9	1 (0+1)	+1:57.3
49	30	Joanne Reid	United States	21:10.2	2 (1+1)	+1:57.6
50	7	Baiba Bendika	Latvia	21:10.4	2 (0+2)	+1:57.8
51	19	Darya Usanova	Kazakhstan	21:13.0	3 (0+3)	+2:00.4
52	22	Tang Jialin	China	21:13.4	1 (0+1)	+2:00.8
53	60	Krystyna Guzik	Poland	21:14.0	1 (0+1)	+2:01.4
54	94	Marte Olsbu	Norway	21:17.7	3 (3+0)	+2:05.1
55	39	Maren Hammerschmidt	Germany	21:21.0	4 (3+1)	+2:08.4
56	26	Mona Brorsson	Sweden	21:22.1	2 (1+1)	+2:09.5
57	13	Mari Laukkanen	Finland	21:22.2	4 (3+1)	+2:09.6
58	37	Hilde Fenne	Norway	21:24.4	3 (1+2)	+2:11.8
59	51	Sari Furuya	Japan	21:25.0	2 (1+1)	+2:12.4
60	88	Katharina Innerhofer	Austria	21:31.1	2 (0+2)	+2:18.5
61	86	Nadzeya Pisarava	Belarus	21:31.2	2 (0+2)	+2:18.6
62	41	Jana Gereková	Slovakia	21:32.9	3 (1+2)	+2:20.3
63	91	Ekaterina Avvakumova	South Korea	21:33.0	2 (1+1)	+2:20.4
64	97	Megan Tandy	Canada	21:33.5	1 (1+0)	+2:20.9
65	33	Julia Ransom	Canada	21:37.3	2 (0+2)	+2:24.7
66	35	Amanda Lightfoot	Great Britain	21:40.2	2 (2+0)	+2:27.6
67	99	Kinga Mitoraj	Poland	21:40.7	1 (0+1)	+2:28.1
68	74	Veronika Vítková	Czech Republic	21:41.5	5 (2+3)	+2:28.9
69	49	Zhang Yan	China	21:47.6	2 (0+2)	+2:35.0
70	52	Desislava Stoyanova	Bulgaria	21:50.7	3 (0+3)	+2:38.1
71	78	Meng Fanqi	China	21:53.4	1 (0+1)	+2:40.8
72	67	Fanny Horn Birkeland	Norway	21:55.0	4 (2+2)	+2:42.4
73	44	Mun Ji-hee	South Korea	22:00.3	1 (0+1)	+2:47.4
74	24	Fuyuko Tachizaki	Japan	22:01.4	3 (2+1)	+2:48.4
75	46	Natalija Kočergina	Lithuania	22:03.7	3 (2+0)	+2:51.1
76	92	Éva Tófalvi	Romania	22:05.9	1 (1+0)	+2:53.3
77	70	Elisa Gasparin	Switzerland	22:09.0	3 (2+1)	+2:56.4
78	89	Madeleine Phaneuf	United States	22:09.2	2 (0+2)	+2:56.6
79	55	Urška Poje	Slovenia	22:10.7	1 (0+1)	+2:58.1
80	63	Valentyna Semerenko	Ukraine	22:12.9	4 (1+3)	+3:00.3
81	73	Diana Rasimovičiūtė	Lithuania	22:16.2	2 (1+1)	+3:03.6
82	82	Anja Eržen	Slovenia	22:17.5	4 (0+4)	+3:04.9
83	29	Fabienne Hartweger	Austria	22:22.5	4 (3+1)	+3:09.9
84	58	Emma Lunder	Canada	22:22.7	3 (3+0)	+3:10.1
85	62	Luminița Pișcoran	Romania	22:27.6	3 (0+3)	+3:15.0
86	5	Galina Vishnevskaya	Kazakhstan	22:28.7	4 (3+1)	+3:16.1
87	27	Johanna Talihärm	Estonia	22:29.9	3 (2+1)	+3:17.3
88	87	Natalija Paulauskaitė	Lithuania	22:33.9	1 (1+0)	+3:21.3
89	25	Victoria Padial	Spain	22:45.4	2 (1+1)	+3:32.8
90	47	Laura Toivanen	Finland	22:46.2	4 (1+3)	+3:33.6
91	50	Diana Salman	Romania	22:55.1	1 (1+0)	+3:42.5
92	57	Rina Mitsuhashi	Japan	23:05.0	3 (1+2)	+3:52.4
93	72	Kadri Lehtla	Estonia	23:08.4	2 (1+1)	+3:55.8
94	93	Stefani Popova	Bulgaria	23:10.9	2 (2+0)	+3:58.3
95	38	Žanna Juškāne	Latvia	23:31.7	5 (3+2)	+4:19.1
96	45	Maria Tsakiri	Greece	23:36.2	2 (0+2)	+4:23.6
97	84	Kristel Viigipuu	Estonia	23:48.4	2 (0+2)	+4:35.8
98	79	Alla Ghilenko	Moldova	23:51.6	2 (0+2)	+4:39.0
99	34	Emőke Szőcs	Hungary	23:54.0	6 (2+4)	+4:41.4
100	31	Tanja Karišik	Bosnia and Herzegovina	24:13.6	4 (2+2)	+5:01.0
101	40	Anastasiya Nychyporenko	Moldova	24:18.7	3 (0+3)	+5:06.1
