= Biathlon World Championships 2019 – Women's sprint =

Women's sprint at the Biathlon World Championships 2019
- Venue: Östersund Ski Stadium
- Location: Östersund, Sweden
- Dates: 8 March
- Competitors: 94 from 30 nations
- Winning time: 22:17.5

Medalists
gold medal	Anastasiya Kuzmina	Slovakia
silver medal	Ingrid Landmark Tandrevold	Norway
bronze medal	Laura Dahlmeier	Germany

The women's sprint competition at the Biathlon World Championships 2019 was held on 8 March 2019.

== Results ==
The race was started at 16:15.

Rank	Bib	Name	Nationality	Time	Penalties (P+S)	Deficit
1st place, gold medalist(s)	43	Anastasiya Kuzmina	Slovakia	22:17.5	1 (1+0)	
2nd place, silver medalist(s)	33	Ingrid Landmark Tandrevold	Norway	22:27.2	0 (0+0)	+9.7
3rd place, bronze medalist(s)	52	Laura Dahlmeier	Germany	22:30.1	0 (0+0)	+12.6
4	40	Hanna Öberg	Sweden	22:30.7	1 (1+0)	+13.2
5	42	Mona Brorsson	Sweden	22:39.2	1 (0+1)	+21.7
6	79	Denise Herrmann	Germany	22:41.4	2 (0+2)	+23.9
7	72	Markéta Davidová	Czech Republic	22:44.0	1 (1+0)	+26.5
8	57	Ekaterina Yurlova-Percht	Russia	22:48.9	1 (0+1)	+31.4
9	12	Tiril Eckhoff	Norway	22:50.1	2 (1+1)	+32.6
10	18	Dorothea Wierer	Italy	22:50.7	2 (2+0)	+33.2
11	30	Clare Egan	United States	22:50.8	1 (1+0)	+33.3
12	46	Kaisa Mäkäräinen	Finland	22:51.5	2 (0+2)	+34.0
13	14	Dzinara Alimbekava	Belarus	23:02.6	0 (0+0)	+45.1
14	38	Sari Maeda	Japan	23:06.4	1 (1+0)	+48.9
15	10	Joanne Reid	United States	23:07.6	0 (0+0)	+50.1
16	73	Franziska Preuß	Germany	23:09.9	1 (0+1)	+52.4
17	70	Baiba Bendika	Latvia	23:13.0	1 (0+1)	+55.5
18	50	Rosanna Crawford	Canada	23:13.5	1 (1+0)	+56.0
19	34	Elisa Gasparin	Switzerland	23:15.8	1 (0+1)	+58.3
20	23	Johanna Talihärm	Estonia	23:17.3	1 (0+1)	+59.8
21	24	Lisa Vittozzi	Italy	23:18.9	3 (2+1)	+1:01.4
22	3	Irina Kruchinkina	Belarus	23:20.0	1 (0+1)	+1:02.5
23	61	Célia Aymonier	France	23:22.9	2 (0+2)	+1:05.4
24	94	Evgeniya Pavlova	Russia	23:25.1	0 (0+0)	+1:07.6
25	31	Marte Olsbu Røiseland	Norway	23:28.6	4 (2+2)	+1:11.1
26	76	Iryna Kryuko	Belarus	23:29.5	1 (0+1)	+1:12.0
27	28	Natalija Kočergina	Lithuania	23:34.1	0 (0+0)	+1:16.6
28	66	Anastasiya Merkushyna	Ukraine	23:34.8	1 (0+1)	+1:17.3
29	1	Valentyna Semerenko	Ukraine	23:37.5	2 (2+0)	+1:20.0
30	9	Selina Gasparin	Switzerland	23:40.6	2 (0+2)	+1:23.1
31	25	Svetlana Mironova	Russia	23:43.6	3 (2+1)	+1:26.1
32	29	Anaïs Chevalier	France	23:49.3	1 (1+0)	+1:31.8
33	69	Ivona Fialková	Slovakia	23:53.7	2 (2+0)	+1:36.2
34	13	Monika Hojnisz	Poland	23:54.1	2 (1+1)	+1:36.6
34	75	Federica Sanfilippo	Italy	23:54.1	2 (1+1)	+1:36.6
36	82	Elena Kruchinkina	Belarus	23:56.0	3 (0+3)	+1:38.5
37	81	Zhang Yan	China	23:56.9	0 (0+0)	+1:39.4
38	39	Veronika Vítková	Czech Republic	23:59.5	2 (2+0)	+1:42.0
39	55	Fuyuko Tachizaki	Japan	24:12.5	2 (2+0)	+1:55.0
40	48	Franziska Hildebrand	Germany	24:12.9	2 (0+2)	+1:55.4
41	58	Tang Jialin	China	24:14.0	0 (0+0)	+1:56.5
42	54	Linn Persson	Sweden	24:17.7	3 (2+1)	+2:00.2
43	92	Anna Magnusson	Sweden	24:20.4	3 (2+1)	+2:02.9
44	6	Irina Starykh	Russia	24:24.5	1 (0+1)	+2:07.0
45	51	Venla Lehtonen	Finland	24:24.8	1 (0+1)	+2:07.3
46	41	Kamila Żuk	Poland	24:26.7	2 (0+2)	+2:09.2
47	16	Sarah Beaudry	Canada	24:27.3	2 (0+2)	+2:09.8
48	49	Paulína Fialková	Slovakia	24:27.6	4 (2+2)	+2:10.1
49	85	Katharina Innerhofer	Austria	24:28.4	2 (1+1)	+2:10.9
50	47	Tuuli Tomingas	Estonia	24:28.6	2 (1+1)	+2:11.1
51	88	Emma Lunder	Canada	24:28.9	1 (0+1)	+2:11.4
52	19	Nicole Gontier	Italy	24:29.3	5 (3+2)	+2:11.8
53	67	Lena Häcki	Switzerland	24:30.2	3 (2+1)	+2:12.7
54	37	Yuliia Dzhima	Ukraine	24:38.1	2 (0+2)	+2:20.6
55	56	Julia Schwaiger	Austria	24:40.9	2 (0+2)	+2:23.4
55	89	Magdalena Gwizdoń	Poland	24:40.9	3 (2+1)	+2:23.4
57	77	Susan Dunklee	United States	24:48.1	4 (2+2)	+2:30.6
58	2	Megan Bankes	Canada	24:49.2	2 (0+2)	+2:31.7
59	95	Eva Puskarčíková	Czech Republic	24:49.8	2 (1+1)	+2:32.3
60	83	Justine Braisaz	France	24:52.0	5 (2+3)	+2:34.5
61	17	Julia Simon	France	24:52.8	5 (2+3)	+2:35.3
62	68	Synnøve Solemdal	Norway	24:53.0	4 (1+3)	+2:35.5
63	84	Laura Toivanen	Finland	24:55.7	2 (0+2)	+2:38.2
64	26	Meng Fanqi	China	24:57.2	2 (1+1)	+2:39.7
65	36	Vanessa Hinz	Germany	25:05.2	4 (1+3)	+2:47.7
66	64	Kinga Zbylut	Poland	25:07.7	3 (1+2)	+2:50.2
67	11	Daniela Kadeva	Bulgaria	25:10.5	3 (3+0)	+2:53.0
68	21	Galina Vishnevskaya	Kazakhstan	25:11.7	3 (1+2)	+2:54.2
69	45	Lea Einfalt	Slovenia	25:12.9	2 (1+1)	+2:55.4
70	65	Lisa Hauser	Austria	25:13.1	5 (0+5)	+2:55.6
71	8	Lucie Charvátová	Czech Republic	25:14.3	4 (3+1)	+2:56.8
72	74	Emilia Yordanova	Bulgaria	25:15.3	3 (1+2)	+2:57.8
73	35	Suvi Minkkinen	Finland	25:16.3	2 (1+1)	+2:58.8
74	27	Enikő Márton	Romania	25:17.9	1 (0+1)	+3:00.4
75	93	Aita Gasparin	Switzerland	25:21.4	3 (1+2)	+3:03.9
76	91	Vita Semerenko	Ukraine	25:23.1	4 (2+2)	+3:05.6
77	20	Polona Klemenčič	Slovenia	25:24.6	4 (3+1)	+3:07.1
78	15	Anna Frolina	South Korea	25:40.3	5 (3+2)	+3:22.8
79	87	Desislava Stoyanova	Bulgaria	25:41.3	4 (3+1)	+3:23.8
80	7	Lyudmila Akhatova	Kazakhstan	26:06.6	2 (1+1)	+3:49.1
81	86	Regina Oja	Estonia	26:30.9	5 (4+1)	+4:13.4
82	44	Nika Blaženić	Croatia	26:46.0	4 (2+2)	+4:28.5
83	59	Kim Seon-su	South Korea	26:46.3	2 (2+0)	+4:28.8
84	78	Alla Ghilenko	Moldova	26:46.9	2 (1+1)	+4:29.4
85	80	Kirari Tanaka	Japan	26:50.4	4 (1+3)	+4:32.9
86	5	Terézia Poliaková	Slovakia	27:00.1	4 (1+3)	+4:42.6
87	63	Gabrielė Leščinskaitė	Lithuania	27:09.5	3 (1+2)	+4:52.0
88	71	Anika Kožica	Croatia	27:38.2	3 (2+1)	+5:20.7
89	4	Ko Eun-jung	South Korea	27:38.3	3 (2+1)	+5:20.8
90	60	Jillian Colebourn	Australia	27:55.3	3 (2+1)	+5:37.8
91	22	Rieke De Maeyer	Belgium	28:40.9	2 (0+2)	+6:23.4
92	90	Anastassiya Kondratyeva	Kazakhstan	29:10.5	5 (3+2)	+6:53.0
93	32	Jūlija Matvijenko	Latvia	30:00.5	5 (2+3)	+7:43.0
	62	Ana Larisa Cotrus	Romania	DNF	7 (2+5)	
	53	Yelizaveta Belchenko	Kazakhstan	Did not start		
