= Eita =

Eita may refer to:

- Eita (name), a Japanese male given name
- Eita (actor), Eita Nagayama (born 1982), Japanese actor
- Eita (wrestler) (born 1991), Japanese professional wrestler
- Eita (mythology), or Aita, an epithet of the Etruscan chthonic fire god Śuri
- Eita, Kiribati, an atoll and settlement in Kiribati
- Eita (Grosio), a village in Grosio, Italy

== See also ==
- Aita (disambiguation)
- Eitan (disambiguation)
- Heita (disambiguation)
