= Biathlon World Championships 2015 – Women's pursuit =

Women's pursuit at the Biathlon World Championships 2015
- Venue: Kontiolahti, Finland
- Date: 8 March 2015
- Competitors: 58 from 25 nations
- Winning time: 30:07.7

Medalists
gold medal	Marie Dorin Habert	France
silver medal	Laura Dahlmeier	Germany
bronze medal	Weronika Nowakowska-Ziemniak	Poland

The Women's pursuit event of the Biathlon World Championships 2015 was held on 8 March 2015. The fastest 60 athletes of the sprint competition participated over a course of 10 km.

== Results ==
The race was started at 17:00 EET.

Rank	Bib	Name	Nationality	Start	Penalties (P+P+S+S)	Time	Deficit
1st place, gold medalist(s)	1	Marie Dorin Habert	France	0:00	3 (0+0+2+1)	30:07.7	
2nd place, silver medalist(s)	4	Laura Dahlmeier	Germany	0:29	2 (1+0+0+1)	30:23.0	+15.3
3rd place, bronze medalist(s)	2	Weronika Nowakowska-Ziemniak	Poland	0:10	3 (0+1+2+0)	30:39.3	+31.6
4	6	Ekaterina Shumilova	Russia	0:49	0 (0+0+0+0)	30:56.4	+48.7
5	18	Gabriela Soukalová	Czech Republic	1:40	1 (1+0+0+0)	31:05.7	+58.0
6	10	Franziska Hildebrand	Germany	1:10	2 (1+0+1+0)	31:07.7	+1:00.0
7	25	Darya Domracheva	Belarus	1:58	2 (0+1+0+1)	31:12.2	+1:04.5
8	5	Krystyna Guzik	Poland	0:40	2 (2+0+0+0)	31:19.9	+1:12.1
9	20	Dorothea Wierer	Italy	1:46	1 (0+0+0+1)	31:23.8	+1:16.1
10	9	Olga Abramova	Ukraine	1:03	2 (1+0+1+0)	31:34.2	+1:26.5
11	15	Veronika Vítková	Czech Republic	1:23	4 (2+2+0+0)	31:35.4	+1:27.7
12	35	Kaisa Mäkäräinen	Finland	2:21	3 (2+0+1+0)	31:35.7	+1:28.0
13	14	Franziska Preuß	Germany	1:19	3 (1+1+0+1)	31:40.9	+1:33.2
14	12	Jana Gereková	Slovakia	1:11	3 (0+1+1+1)	31:43.6	+1:35.9
15	13	Elisa Gasparin	Switzerland	1:13	3 (1+0+1+1)	31:47.3	+1:39.6
16	21	Daria Virolaynen	Russia	1:50	2 (0+0+1+1)	31:47.9	+1:40.2
17	7	Magdalena Gwizdoń	Poland	0:52	4 (2+0+1+1)	32:13.9	+2:06.2
18	19	Tiril Eckhoff	Norway	1:43	4 (0+1+3+0)	32:26.0	+2:18.3
19	3	Valj Semerenko	Ukraine	0:20	6 (3+1+0+2)	32:31.5	+2:23.8
20	8	Andreja Mali	Slovenia	1:02	4 (1+0+1+2)	32:45.8	+2:38.1
21	24	Lisa Hauser	Austria	1:56	2 (0+1+0+1)	32:51.5	+2:43.8
22	17	Dunja Zdouc	Austria	1:39	3 (0+1+1+1)	32:52.1	+2:44.4
23	22	Fuyuko Suzuki	Japan	1:52	4 (0+2+1+1)	32:56.5	+2:48.8
24	32	Rosanna Crawford	Canada	2:13	3 (2+0+1+0)	32:59.2	+2:51.5
25	37	Iryna Varvynets	Ukraine	2:27	3 (0+0+2+1)	33:20.7	+3:13.0
26	45	Olga Podchufarova	Russia	2:40	2 (0+0+2+0)	33:24.9	+3:17.2
27	23	Megan Heinicke	Canada	1:55	2 (1+0+0+1)	33:27.1	+3:19.4
28	36	Iana Bondar	Ukraine	2:25	5 (1+1+0+3)	33:40.9	+3:33.2
29	16	Mari Laukkanen	Finland	1:23	6 (3+1+1+1)	33:44.8	+3:37.1
30	43	Kadri Lehtla	Estonia	2:36	3 (1+1+1+0)	33:50.9	+3:43.2
31	27	Katharina Innerhofer	Austria	2:02	3 (1+0+0+2)	33:56.1	+3:48.4
32	11	Nastassia Dubarezava	Belarus	1:11	5 (1+1+2+1)	33:58.2	+3:50.5
33	42	Susan Dunklee	United States	2:35	6 (1+1+2+2)	34:05.8	+3:58.1
34	34	Justine Braisaz	France	2:20	6 (2+1+2+1)	34:08.5	+4:00.8
35	28	Lena Häcki	Switzerland	2:03	6 (1+1+1+3)	34:14.5	+4:06.8
36	49	Vanessa Hinz	Germany	2:45	4 (0+1+2+1)	34:19.2	+4:11.5
37	54	Elise Ringen	Norway	2:57	3 (0+2+1+0)	34:20.0	+4:12.3
38	29	Mona Brorsson	Sweden	2:08	3 (0+2+1+0)	34:33.2	+4:25.5
39	30	Karin Oberhofer	Italy	2:11	8 (1+3+3+1)	34:54.4	+4:46.7
40	60	Lisa Vittozzi	Italy	3:09	4 (1+0+2+1)	35:03.6	+4:55.9
41	31	Marte Olsbu	Norway	2:12	3 (1+2+0+0)	35:10.5	+5:02.8
42	59	Martina Chrapánová	Slovakia	3:08	3 (1+1+1+0)	35:11.6	+5:03.9
43	39	Johanna Talihaerm	Estonia	2:29	4 (0+2+1+1)	35:24.7	+5:17.0
44	51	Elisabeth Högberg	Sweden	2:48	5 (0+0+2+3)	35:34.2	+5:26.5
45	38	Desislava Stoyanova	Bulgaria	2:29	5 (0+2+1+2)	35:39.1	+5:31.4
46	58	Song Chaoqing	China	3:07	5 (0+2+1+2)	35:44.7	+5:37.0
47	48	Amanda Lightfoot	Great Britain	2:44	5 (1+0+1+3)	35:44.9	+5:37.2
48	57	Terézia Poliaková	Slovakia	3:05	5 (1+0+2+2)	36:13.4	+6:05.7
49	50	Nadzeya Pisarava	Belarus	2:46	7 (2+1+3+2)	36:30.8	+6:23.1
50	55	Mun Ji-hee	South Korea	2:58	5 (0+2+1+2)	36:30.8	+6:23.1
51	40	Clare Egan	United States	2:30	7 (1+1+3+2)	36:36.9	+6:29.2
52	47	Anna Kistanova	Kazakhstan	2:44	6 (1+1+1+3)	36:43.6	+6:35.9
53	41	Wang Yue	China	2:33	7 (1+2+3+1)	37:04.5	+6:56.8
54	33	Emilia Yordanova	Bulgaria	2:16	7 (2+2+1+2)	37:26.8	+7:19.1
55	44	Miki Kobayashi	Japan	2:39	8 (0+3+1+4)	37:33.8	+7:26.1
56	52	Julia Ransom	Canada	2:52	7 (1+2+2+2)	38:10.5	+8:02.8
57	46	Luminița Pișcoran	Romania	2:41	10 (3+3+3+1)	38:30.3	+8:22.6
	53	Coline Varcin	France	2:56	Did not start		
	56	Anaïs Bescond	France	3:04	Did not start		
DSQ	26	Ekaterina Glazyrina	Russia	2:02	2 (1+0+1+0)	32:47.2	+2:39.5
