= Aita (disambiguation) =

Aita is an Etruscan deity, equivalent to the Greek god Hades.

Aita or AITA may also refer to:

- Aita (Morocco), a Bedouin musical style
- Aita (river), a tributary of the Olt in Romania
- Aita, a dialect of the Rotokas language
- All India Tennis Association
- r/AmItheAsshole or AITA, a subreddit

== People ==
- Aita (surname)

=== Given name ===
- Aita Donostia, pen name of Jose Gonzalo Zulaika (1886–1956), Basque musicologist and composer
- Aita Gasparin (born 1994), Swiss biathlete
- Aita Ighodaro, British author
- Aita Shaposhnikova (born 1957), Yakut translator and critic

== See also ==
- Abisara aita, a butterfly species
