= Arita =

Arita may refer to:

- Arita (surname)
- Arita, Saga, a town in Saga Prefecture, Japan

- Arita ware, a kind of Japanese porcelain made in the area around the town

- Arita (butterfly), a synonym for a genus of skipper butterflies
- Arita, a brand name from Ritek
- Arita, a red berry mentioned in the novel The Blue Lagoon
