= Biathlon World Championships 2016 – Women's pursuit =

Women's pursuit at the Biathlon World Championships 2016
- Venue: Oslo, Norway
- Date: 6 March
- Competitors: 60 from 22 nations
- Winning time: 30:49.2

Medalists
gold medal	Laura Dahlmeier	Germany
silver medal	Dorothea Wierer	Italy
bronze medal	Marie Dorin Habert	France

The Women's pursuit event of the Biathlon World Championships 2016 was held on 6 March 2016. The fastest 60 athletes of the sprint competition participated over a course of 10 km.

== Results ==
The race was started at 15:45 CET.

Rank	Bib	Name	Nationality	Start	Penalties (P+P+S+S)	Time	Deficit
1st place, gold medalist(s)	3	Laura Dahlmeier	Germany	0:20	0 (0+0+0+0)	30:49.2	
2nd place, silver medalist(s)	5	Dorothea Wierer	Italy	0:38	2 (0+1+1+0)	31:37.5	+48.3
3rd place, bronze medalist(s)	2	Marie Dorin Habert	France	0:15	3 (0+0+2+1)	31:46.5	+57.3
4	10	Franziska Hildebrand	Germany	0:51	1 (1+0+0+0)	31:51.0	+1:01.8
5	16	Olena Pidhrushna	Ukraine	1:08	1 (0+0+1+0)	32:07.8	+1:18.6
6	14	Franziska Preuß	Germany	1:05	0 (0+0+0+0)	32:08.2	+1:19.0
7	9	Kaisa Mäkäräinen	Finland	0:49	4 (2+0+2+0)	32:29.2	+1:40.0
8	7	Veronika Vítková	Czech Republic	0:46	3 (1+0+2+0)	32:31.7	+1:42.5
9	31	Yuliia Dzhima	Ukraine	1:36	1 (0+0+1+0)	32:37.4	+1:48.2
10	8	Susan Dunklee	United States	0:48	4 (0+1+3+0)	32:41.7	+1:52.5
11	4	Gabriela Soukalová	Czech Republic	0:38	5 (2+2+0+1)	32:45.3	+1:56.1
12	12	Anaïs Bescond	France	0:54	4 (2+0+1+1)	32:46.6	+1:57.4
13	20	Lisa Vittozzi	Italy	1:20	2 (0+1+0+1)	32:47.1	+1:57.9
14	13	Iryna Varvynets	Ukraine	0:55	2 (0+0+1+1)	32:48.0	+1:58.8
15	26	Anaïs Chevalier	France	1:28	1 (0+0+1+0)	32:50.3	+2:01.1
16	11	Marte Olsbu	Norway	0:53	4 (2+0+2+0)	33:03.4	+2:14.2
17	1	Tiril Eckhoff	Norway	0:00	7 (1+1+1+4)	33:17.7	+2:28.5
18	33	Lucie Charvátová	Czech Republic	1:44	3 (0+1+0+2)	33:24.1	+2:34.9
19	42	Fanny Horn Birkeland	Norway	1:57	3 (0+0+1+2)	33:25.1	+2:35.9
20	17	Lisa Hauser	Austria	1:08	3 (0+1+2+0)	33:29.8	+2:40.6
21	19	Ekaterina Yurlova	Russia	1:20	3 (0+0+3+0)	33:39.8	+2:50.6
22	25	Justine Braisaz	France	1:27	3 (2+0+0+1)	33:39.8	+2:50.6
23	49	Paulina Fialková	Slovakia	2:14	2 (1+1+0+0)	33:55.9	+3:06.7
24	35	Synnøve Solemdal	Norway	1:45	3 (0+0+1+2)	33:58.0	+3:08.8
25	24	Galina Vishnevskaya	Kazakhstan	1:27	3 (1+2+0+0)	34:00.4	+3:11.2
26	28	Tatiana Akimova	Russia	1:29	3 (0+0+1+2)	34:02.2	+3:13.0
27	29	Rosanna Crawford	Canada	1:34	4 (1+0+1+2)	34:04.1	+3:14.9
28	58	Dunja Zdouc	Austria	2:25	1 (0+0+1+0)	34:05.4	+3:16.2
29	44	Monika Hojnisz	Poland	1:59	2 (0+1+0+1)	34:08.3	+3:19.1
30	55	Magdalena Gwizdoń	Poland	2:19	2 (0+1+0+1)	34:10.3	+3:21.1
31	36	Karin Oberhofer	Italy	1:45	4 (2+0+2+0)	34:20.6	+3:31.4
32	22	Ingela Andersson	Sweden	1:24	3 (1+0+2+0)	34:24.4	+3:35.2
33	21	Lena Häcki	Switzerland	1:23	5 (2+1+1+1)	34:26.9	+3:37.7
34	15	Tang Jialin	China	1:07	3 (0+1+1+1)	34:27.3	+3:38.1
35	27	Darya Usanova	Kazakhstan	1:28	5 (2+1+1+1)	34:28.9	+3:39.7
36	18	Hannah Dreissigacker	United States	1:18	4 (2+0+1+1)	34:32.4	+3:43.2
37	38	Daria Virolaynen	Russia	1:51	5 (0+1+1+3)	35:00.9	+4:11.7
38	48	Emilia Yordanova	Bulgaria	2:09	1 (0+0+0+1)	35:06.0	+4:16.8
39	6	Mona Brorsson	Sweden	0:44	7 (3+2+0+3)	35:07.3	+4:18.1
40	34	Linn Persson	Sweden	1:45	5 (1+1+2+1)	35:17.4	+4:28.2
41	37	Susanne Hoffmann	Austria	1:50	3 (1+0+2+0)	35:23.4	+4:34.2
42	50	Julia Ransom	Canada	2:15	3 (0+0+2+1)	35:27.4	+4:38.2
43	32	Nadezhda Skardino	Belarus	1:40	6 (2+2+2+0)	35:42.1	+4:52.9
44	47	Fuyuko Tachizaki	Japan	2:09	5 (2+1+0+2)	35:46.7	+4:57.5
45	52	Mari Laukkanen	Finland	2:16	3 (0+1+2+0)	35:53.6	+5:04.4
46	40	Jana Gereková	Slovakia	1:55	6 (3+1+1+1)	36:12.2	+5:23.0
47	30	Teja Gregorin	Slovenia	1:35	7 (2+0+3+2)	36:13.0	+5:23.8
48	41	Jessica Jislová	Czech Republic	1:56	6 (0+0+3+3)	36:14.0	+5:24.8
49	56	Desislava Stoyanova	Bulgaria	2:21	5 (2+2+0+1)	36:14.1	+5:24.9
50	51	Federica Sanfilippo	Italy	2:15	7 (1+0+3+3)	36:33.5	+5:44.3
51	46	Irene Cadurisch	Switzerland	2:05	6 (0+4+1+1)	36:43.8	+5:54.6
52	23	Nastassia Dubarezava	Belarus	1:26	8 (1+3+3+1)	36:49.6	+6:00.4
53	43	Ivona Fialková	Slovakia	1:59	7 (2+2+2+1)	36:50.2	+6:01.0
54	59	Andreja Mali	Slovenia	2:25	4 (2+0+2+0)	36:59.8	+6:10.6
55	54	Anja Eržen	Slovenia	2:18	7 (2+2+1+2)	37:02.6	+6:13.4
56	57	Éva Tófalvi	Romania	2:23	6 (2+2+1+1)	37:19.2	+6:30.0
57	53	Anna Magnusson	Sweden	2:17	6 (2+1+1+2)	37:21:5	+6:32.3
58	39	Terézia Poliaková	Slovakia	1:53	6 (4+0+0+2)	37:32.7	+6:43.5
59	45	Zhang Yan	China	2:04	5 (2+2+1+0)	38:04.5	+7:15.3
—	60	Krystyna Guzik	Poland	2:27	DNS		
