= Biathlon World Championships 2017 – Mixed relay =

Sports Contest

Mixed relay at the Biathlon World Championships 2017
- Location: Hochfilzen, Austria
- Dates: 9 February
- Competitors: 100 from 25 nations
- Teams: 25
- Winning time: 1:09:06.4

Medalists
gold medal	Vanessa Hinz; Laura Dahlmeier; Arnd Peiffer; Simon Schempp	Germany
silver medal	Anaïs Chevalier; Marie Dorin Habert; Quentin Fillon Maillet; Martin Fourcade	France
bronze medal	Olga Podchufarova; Tatiana Akimova; Alexandr Loginov; Anton Shipulin	Russia

The Mixed relay competition at the 2017 World Championships was held on 9 February 2017.

== Results ==
The race was started at 14:45.

Rank	Bib	Team	Time	Penalties (P+S)	Deficit
1st place, gold medalist(s)	2	Germany; Vanessa Hinz; Laura Dahlmeier; Arnd Peiffer; Simon Schempp	1:09:06.4; 16:37.4; 16:26.6; 18:05.7; 17:56.7	0+2 0+5; 0+0 0+2; 0+2 0+2; 0+0 0+0; 0+0 0+1	
2nd place, silver medalist(s)	5	France; Anaïs Chevalier; Marie Dorin Habert; Quentin Fillon Maillet; Martin Fourcade	1:09:08.6; 16:41.5; 16:23.3; 18:51.4; 17:12.4	0+1 1+7; 0+0 0+2; 0+0 0+2; 0+1 1+3; 0+0 0+0	+2.2
3rd place, bronze medalist(s)	4	Russia; Olga Podchufarova; Tatiana Akimova; Alexandr Loginov; Anton Shipulin	1:09:09.6; 17:03.9; 16:22.1; 18:31.1; 17:12.5	0+1 0+3; 0+0 0+0; 0+1 0+0; 0+0 0+3; 0+0 0+0	+3.2
4	3	Italy; Lisa Vittozzi; Dorothea Wierer; Lukas Hofer; Dominik Windisch	1:09:35.1; 16:27.6; 16:40.2; 18:23.1; 18:04.2	0+2 0+4; 0+0 0+0; 0+1 0+2; 0+1 0+0; 0+0 0+2	+28.7
5	10	Ukraine; Olena Pidhrushna; Yuliia Dzhima; Serhiy Semenov; Dmytro Pidruchnyi	1:09:42.0; 17:06.6; 16:33.3; 18:26.4; 17:35.7	0+3 0+5; 0+2 0+2; 0+0 0+1; 0+1 0+2; 0+0 0+0	+35.6
6	6	Sweden; Hanna Öberg; Anna Magnusson; Jesper Nelin; Fredrik Lindström	1:09:48.0; 16:51.4; 16:37.6; 18:35.4; 17:43.6	0+3 0+5; 0+1 0+1; 0+0 0+0; 0+0 0+3; 0+2 0+1	+41.6
7	7	Czech Republic; Eva Puskarčíková; Gabriela Koukalová; Ondřej Moravec; Michal Krčmář	1:09:48.3; 17:37.9; 16:07.9; 18:11.8; 17:50.7	0+2 2+7; 0+0 2+3; 0+0 0+1; 0+1 0+1; 0+1 0+2	+41.9
8	1	Norway; Marte Olsbu; Tiril Eckhoff; Johannes Thingnes Bø; Emil Hegle Svendsen	1:09:52.6; 16:29.4; 17:17.1; 18:31.9; 17:34.2	1+4 1+6; 0+1 0+0; 1+3 0+2; 0+0 1+3; 0+0 0+1	+46.2
9	11	Austria; Lisa Hauser; Fabienne Hartweger; Simon Eder; Dominik Landertinger	1:10:26.6; 16:33.3; 17:59.2; 18:13.4; 17:40.7	1+5 0+3; 0+2 0+0; 1+3 0+1; 0+0 0+2; 0+0 0+0	+1:20.2
10	13	Finland; Mari Laukkanen; Kaisa Mäkäräinen; Tuomas Grönman; Olli Hiidensalo	1:10:45.3; 16:36.6; 16:46.5; 18:55.0; 18:27.2	0+4 0+5; 0+1 0+1; 0+2 0+2; 0+0 0+1; 0+1 0+1	+1:38.9
11	15	Kazakhstan; Olga Poltoranina; Anna Kistanova; Maxim Braun; Yan Savitskiy	1:11:05.0; 16:59.6; 16:56.9; 18:36.2; 18:32.3	0+0 0+6; 0+0 0+1; 0+0 0+2; 0+0 0+0; 0+0 0+3	+1:58.6
12	20	Slovakia; Paulína Fialková; Jana Gereková; Tomáš Hasilla; Martin Otčenáš	1:11:13.8; 16:50.9; 17:04.9; 18:54.4; 18:23.6	0+6 0+4; 0+2 0+1; 0+0 0+2; 0+1 0+1; 0+3 0+0	+2:07.4
13	22	Canada; Julia Ransom; Rosanna Crawford; Brendan Green; Scott Gow	1:11:24.6; 17:26.6; 17:06.4; 18:43.5; 18:08.1	0+7 0+2; 0+3 0+1; 0+3 0+0; 0+1 0+0; 0+0 0+1	+2:18.2
14	9	Switzerland; Aita Gasparin; Lena Häcki; Benjamin Weger; Serafin Wiestner	1:11:25.2; 17:04.4; 17:17.4; 18:54.3; 18:09.1	0+5 0+7; 0+2 0+0; 0+2 0+3; 0+1 0+1; 0+0 0+3	+2:18.8
15	24	Japan; Fuyuko Tachizaki; Sari Furuya; Mikito Tachizaki; Tsukasa Kobonoki	1:11:53.4; 16:59.1; 17:24.3; 18:58.0; 18:32.0	0+2 0+2; 0+0 0+1; 0+2 0+1; 0+0 0+0; 0+0 0+0	+2:47.0
16	8	United States; Susan Dunklee; Clare Egan; Lowell Bailey; Sean Doherty	1:12:26.6; 16:35.2; 18:29.8; 18:28.9; 18:52.7	1+7 1+6; 0+2 0+2; 0+1 1+3; 0+1 0+1; 1+3 0+0	+3:20.2
17	17	Bulgaria; Emilia Yordanova; Desislava Stoyanova; Dimitar Gerdzhikov; Vladimir Iliev	1:13:29.2; 17:29.0; 18:30.5; 19:24.9; 18:04.8	0+6 2+6; 0+1 0+2; 0+2 2+3; 0+2 0+0; 0+1 0+1	+4:22.8
18	12	Slovenia; Teja Gregorin; Anja Eržen; Miha Dovžan; Klemen Bauer	1:13:33.7; 16:57.4; 18:29.4; 19:19.5; 18:47.4	1+8 1+5; 0+0 0+0; 0+3 1+3; 0+2 0+1; 1+3 0+1	+4:27.3
19	18	South Korea; Ekaterina Avvakumova; Anna Frolina; Kim Yong-gyu; Lee In-bok	1:13:55.3; 17:30.6; 17:12.5; 19:47.8; 19:24.4	0+1 0+5; 0+1 0+2; 0+0 0+0; 0+0 0+2; 0+0 0+1	+4:48.9
20	23	Romania; Luminița Pișcoran; Éva Tófalvi; Remus Faur; Cornel Puchianu	1:14:20.3; 18:21.9; 18:28.8; 18:39.9; 18:39.7	0+6 1+4; 0+2 1+3; 0+3 0+1; 0+0 0+0; 0+1 0+0	+5:13.9
21	19	Estonia; Kadri Lehtla; Johanna Talihärm; Rene Zahkna; Kauri Kõiv	1:14:31.7; 17:58.9; 18:16.5; 19:04.3; 19:12.0	0+7 1+6; 0+0 0+2; 0+3 0+1; 0+2 0+0; 0+2 1+3	+5:25.3
22	14	Belarus; Nadezhda Skardino; Iryna Kryuko; Vladimir Chepelin; Sergey Bocharnikov	1:14:52.7; 16:50.3; 19:00.7; 19:29.2; 19:32.5	3+9 1+8; 0+0 0+2; 2+3 0+1; 0+3 1+3; 1+3 0+2	+5:46.3
23	16	Poland; Anna Mąka; Kinga Mitoraj; Łukasz Szczurek; Rafał Penar	1:16:04.7; 17:56.3; 18:14.0; 19:35.9; 20:18.5	0+2 1+8; 0+0 0+1; 0+1 1+3; 0+0 0+2; 0+1 0+2	+6:58.3
24	21	Lithuania; Natalija Kočergina; Diana Rasimovičiūtė; Vytautas Strolia; Rokas Suslavičius	LAP; 18:41.3; 18:21.7	0+4 3+6; 0+1 1+3; 0+1 0+0; 0+2 2+3	
25	25	Latvia; Baiba Bendika; Žanna Juškāne; Andrejs Rastorgujevs; Ilmārs Bricis	LAP; 17:21.4; 20:24.7	3+5 0+5; 0+1 0+0; 3+3 0+2; 0+2 0+3	
