= Ighodaro =

Ighodaro is a surname. Notable people with the surname include:

- Aita Ighodaro, British author
- Claire Ighodaro, British-born Nigerian accountant
- Irene Ighodaro (1916–1995), Sierra Leonean physician and social reformer
- Osas Ighodaro, Nigerian-American actress, producer, host, and humanitarian
- Oso Ighodaro, American basketball player
