= Aita (surname) =

Aita is a surname. Notable people with the surname include:

- Dario Aita (born 1987), Italian actor
- Fiorella Aíta (born 1977), Peruvian volleyball player
- Kosuke Aita (born 1998), Japanese curler
- Vincenzo Aita (born 1948), Italian politician and a member of the European Parliament
- Zina Aita (1900–1967), Brazilian artist

== See also ==
- Aida (surname)
- Arita (surname)
- Aita (disambiguation)
