= Heita =

Heita may refer to:

- Heita Kawakatsu (川勝 平太; born 1948), Japanese politician
- Heita Station, a railway station located in the city of Kamaishi, Iwate Prefecture, Japan

== See also ==
- Eita (disambiguation)
