= Biathlon World Championships 2016 – Women's mass start =

Women's mass start at the Biathlon World Championships 2016
- Venue: Oslo, Norway
- Date: 13 March
- Competitors: 30 from 15 nations
- Winning time: 35:28.5

Medalists
gold medal	Marie Dorin Habert	France
silver medal	Laura Dahlmeier	Germany
bronze medal	Kaisa Mäkäräinen	Finland

The Women's mass start event of the Biathlon World Championships 2016 was held on 13 March 2016. 30 athletes will participate over a course of 12.5 km.

== Results ==
The race was started at 13:00 CET.

Rank	Bib	Name	Nationality	Penalties (P+P+S+S)	Time	Deficit
1st place, gold medalist(s)	3	Marie Dorin Habert	France	0 (0+0+0+0)	35:28.5	
2nd place, silver medalist(s)	2	Laura Dahlmeier	Germany	1 (0+0+1+0)	35:35.8	+7.3
3rd place, bronze medalist(s)	7	Kaisa Mäkäräinen	Finland	1 (0+0+1+0)	35:36.6	+8.1
4	6	Gabriela Soukalová	Czech Republic	1 (0+1+0+0)	35:59.4	+30.9
5	5	Anaïs Bescond	France	2 (1+0+1+0)	36:07.7	+39.2
6	9	Veronika Vítková	Czech Republic	2 (1+0+0+1)	36:11.2	+42.7
7	19	Marte Olsbu	Norway	3 (1+0+2+0)	36:12.4	+43.9
8	14	Franziska Preuß	Germany	2 (1+0+1+0)	36:12.7	+42.2
9	29	Fanny Horn Birkeland	Norway	2 (1+0+1+0)	36:19.6	+51.1
10	28	Nadezhda Skardino	Belarus	0 (0+0+0+0)	36:20.5	+52.0
11	13	Susan Dunklee	United States	3 (2+0+0+1)	36:28.9	+1:00.4
12	18	Justine Braisaz	France	2 (0+1+0+1)	36:32.7	+1:04.2
13	17	Ekaterina Yurlova	Russia	1 (0+0+0+1)	36:34.7	+1:06.2
14	8	Franziska Hildebrand	Germany	1 (1+0+0+0)	36:48.7	+1:20.2
15	21	Rosanna Crawford	Canada	2 (0+1+1+0)	36:54.2	+1:25.7
16	15	Iryna Varvynets	Ukraine	1 (0+0+1+0)	36:59.6	+1:31.1
17	24	Lisa Vittozzi	Italy	1 (0+1+0+0)	37:03.9	+1:35.4
18	10	Olena Pidhrushna	Ukraine	2 (2+0+0+0)	37:07.7	+1:39.2
19	11	Krystyna Guzik	Poland	3 (1+0+1+1)	37:08.8	+1:40.3
20	4	Dorothea Wierer	Italy	5 (1+2+1+1)	37:20.1	+1:51.6
21	16	Lisa Hauser	Austria	2 (0+0+1+1)	37:23.2	+1:54.7
22	23	Galina Vishnevskaya	Kazakhstan	1 (1+0+0+0)	37:32.4	+2:03.9
23	25	Magdalena Gwizdoń	Poland	2 (1+0+0+1)	37:37.8	+2:09.3
24	1	Tiril Eckhoff	Norway	5 (0+1+3+1)	37:46.7	+2:18.2
25	12	Juliya Dzhyma	Ukraine	3 (0+2+1+0)	38:00.6	+2:32.1
26	30	Valj Semerenko	Ukraine	3 (1+0+2+0)	38:26.7	+2:58.2
27	27	Hannah Dreissigacker	United States	4 (0+2+1+1)	38:43.9	+3:15.4
28	22	Mona Brorsson	Sweden	2 (0+0+1+1)	38:51.3	+3:22.8
29	26	Ingela Andersson	Sweden	4 (0+2+0+2)	39:13.9	+3:45.4
30	20	Anaïs Chevalier	France	7 (3+0+2+2)	41:25.0	+5:56.5
