= Iryna Petrenko =

Ukrainian biathlete (born 1992)

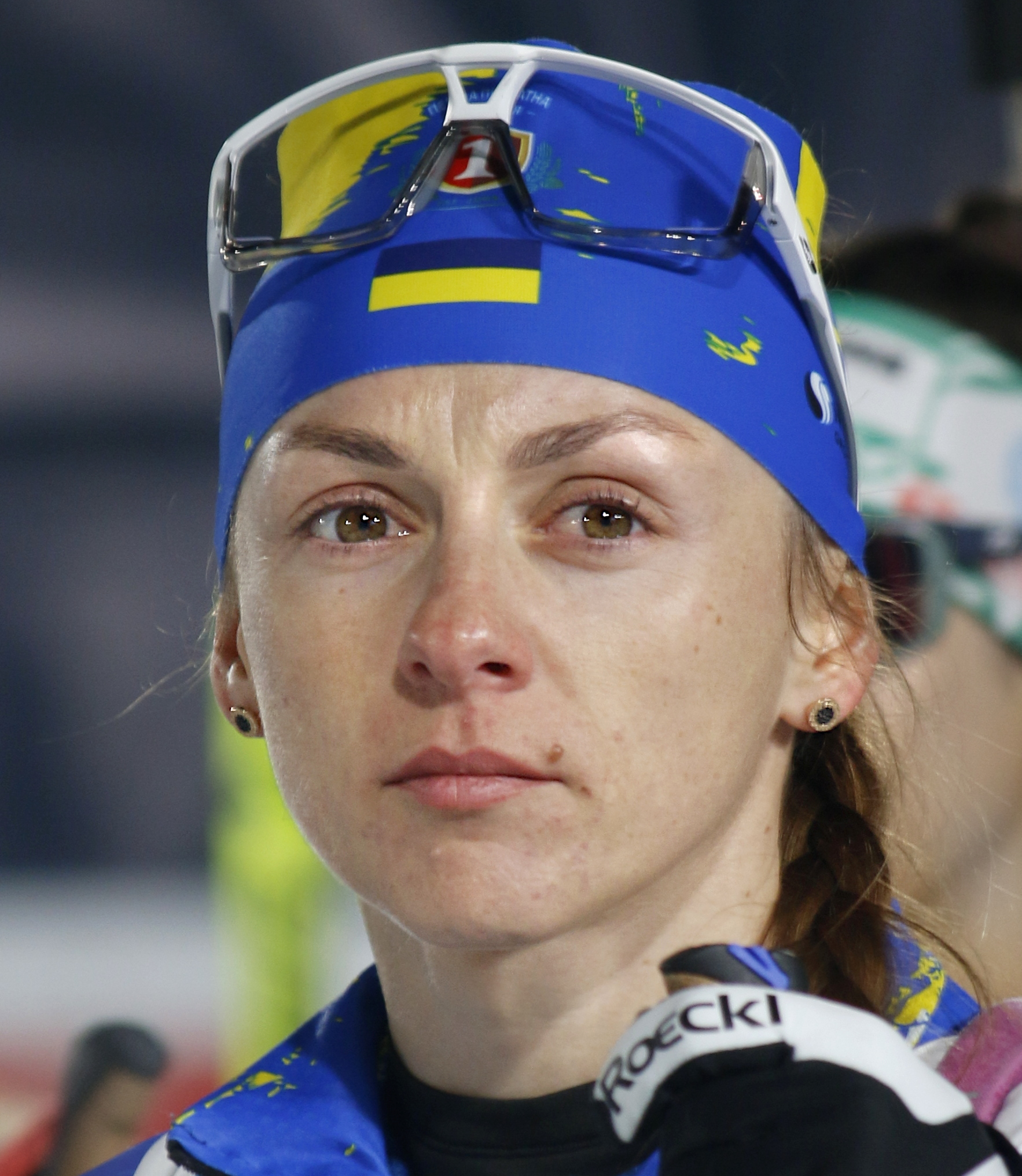
- Petrenko in 2024

Personal information
- Born: 4 July 1992 (age 34) Mokhnatyn, Chernihiv Oblast, Ukraine
- Height: 1.62 m (5 ft 4 in)

Sport
- Sport: Skiing

World Cup career
- Seasons: 2014-2025
Medal record
World Championships
Silver medal – second place	2017 Hochfilzen	4 x 6 km relay
European Championships
Gold medal – first place	2015 Otepää	Relay
Gold medal – first place	2018 Ridnaun	Sprint
Gold medal – first place	2018 Ridnaun	Mixed relay
Silver medal – second place	2015 Otepää	Pursuit
Silver medal – second place	2018 Ridnaun	Pursuit
Bronze medal – third place	2013 Bansko	Relay
Bronze medal – third place	2021 Duszniki-Zdrój	Mixed relay
Junior World Championships
Silver medal – second place	2013 Obertilliach	3 × 6 km relay
Bronze medal – third place	2012 Kontiolahti	3 × 6 km relay
Youth World Championships
Silver medal – second place	2011 Nové Město	3 × 6 km relay
Junior European Championships
Gold medal – first place	2012 Osrblie	Pursuit
Silver medal – second place	2012 Osrblie	Sprint
Bronze medal – third place	2012 Osrblie	Mixed relay
Universiade
Silver medal – second place	2013 Trentino	Mixed relay
Bronze medal – third place	2013 Trentino	Mass start

Iryna Petrenko, née Iryna Varvynets (Ukrainian: Ірина Варвинець; born 4 July 1992, in Mokhnatyn, Chernihiv Oblast, Ukraine) is a Ukrainian former biathlete. She is World Championships medalist. She participated at 2018 Winter Olympics.

== Career ==
Her first international competition was 2009 Junior World Championships in Canmore, Canada. Her best achievement was just 27th in sprint. Next year she also competed only at junior-level competitions. For the first time, she participated in IBU Cup race in season 2010-11. She was 16th and 17th in sprints in Beitostolen, Norway. Later Varvynets had good results in Junior Worlds and Europeans, where she had 4 Top-10 finishes in 6 races and won a silver medal in relay. Next year she improved her performance and won four medals at Junior World and European championships. Two more relay medals came in season 2012-13. She also participated at 2013 Winter Universide in Italian Trentino, winning there silver and bronze medals.

She debuted for the Ukrainian team at the World Cup on 16 January 2014, in the women's sprint in Antholz-Anterselva, Italy, where she was 61st. Following that World Cup stage 2014 in Nové Město wasn't very successful.

In 2014-15 season, she had some good results in IBU Cup, so she got a spot in the women's national team. She participated in the women's relay in Oberhof, Germany. Varvynets was appointed as finisher. She made two additional shots and had good chances to win a medal, but due to her low speed, Ukraine finished just 6th. Nevertheless, she had good personal results, regularly finishing in the points zone and once having a Top-10 finish. So she was included in the team roster for 2015 World championships in Kontiolahti, Finland.

On 17 January 2016, she had her first relay victory in Ruhpolding, Germany. Later that year, Iryna participated at 2016 World Championships in Oslo, Norway, where her best finish was 9th in individual race. Since then, she has been a permanent member of the Ukrainian national team.

Varvynets won a silver medal in relay at 2017 World Championships in Austrian Hochfilzen. But she participated only in one personal race - individual - placing 20th.

She qualified to represent Ukraine at the 2018 Winter Olympics. She was 73rd in sprint and competed in both relays.

== Performances ==
=== Winter Olympics ===
Year	Event	IN	SP	PU	MS	RL	MRL
2018	Pyeongchang, South Korea		73			11	7

=== World Championships ===
Year	Event	IN	SP	PU	MS	RL	MRL
2015	Kontiolahti, Finland	36	37	26		6	
2016	Oslo, Norway	9	13	14	16	5	
2017	Hochfilzen, Austria	20				2	

=== World Cup ===
==== Relay podiums ====
Season	Place	Competition	Placement
2014–15	Nové Město, Czech Republic	Mixed relay	3
2015–16	Ruhpolding, Germany	Relay	1
2015–16	Presque Isle, United States	Relay	2
2016–17	Pokljuka, Slovenia	Relay	3
2016–17	Kontiolahti, Finland	Mixed relay	3

==== Rankings ====
Season	Individual	Sprint	Pursuit	Mass starts	TOTAL
2014–15	25	44	46		45
2015–16	30	33	41	28	34
2016–17	36	49	32		41

=== IBU Cup ===
==== Individual podiums ====
Season	Place	Competition	Rank
2014–15	Obertilliach, Austria	Individual	2
2014–15	Obertilliach, Austria	Sprint	1
2015–16	Ridanna, Italy	Sprint	1
2015–16	Ridanna, Italy	Pursuit	3

==== Relay podiums ====
Season	Place	Competition	Rank
2015–16	Ridanna, Italy	Mixed relay	3
