= Laura Dahlmeier =

German biathlete (1993–2025)

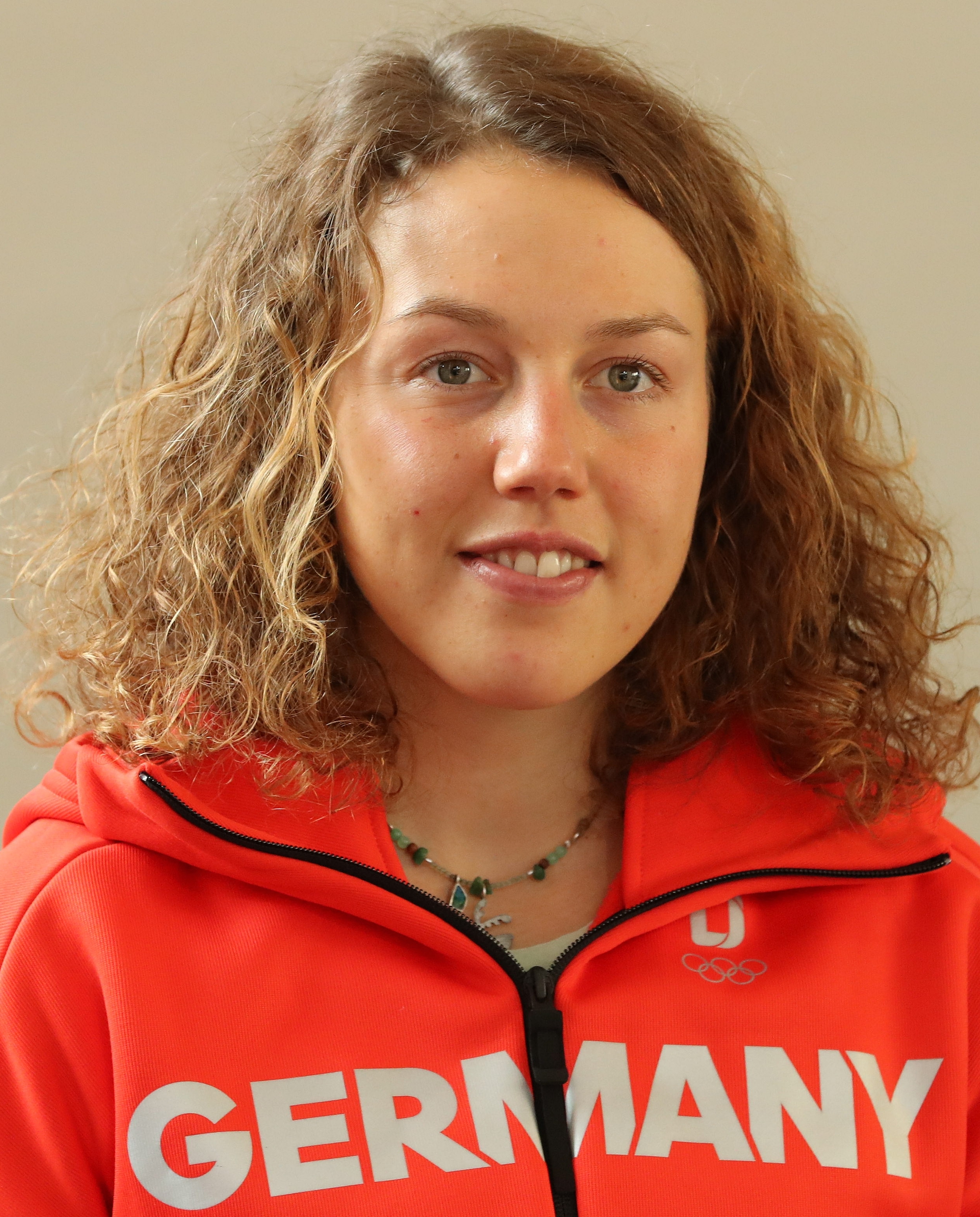
- Dahlmeier in 2018

Personal information
- Nationality: German
- Born: 22 August 1993 Garmisch-Partenkirchen, Bavaria, Germany
- Died: 28 July 2025 (aged 31) Laila Peak, Gilgit-Baltistan, Pakistan
- Website: www.laura-dahlmeier.de

Sport

Professional information
- Sport: Biathlon
- Club: SC Partenkirchen
- World Cup debut: 1 March 2013
- Retired: 17 May 2019

Olympic Games
- Teams: 2 (2014, 2018)
- Medals: 3 (2 gold)

World Championships
- Teams: 5 (2013–2019)
- Medals: 15 (7 gold)

World Cup
- Seasons: 7 (2012–13 – 2018–19)
- Individual races: 124
- All races: 152
- Individual victories: 22
- All victories: 35
- Individual podiums: 50
- All podiums: 71
- Overall titles: 1: 2016–17
- Discipline titles: 2: 1 Individual (2016–17); 1 Pursuit (2016–17)
Medal record
Women's biathlon
Representing Germany
Event	1st	2nd	3rd
Olympic Games	2	0	1
World Championships	7	3	5
Total	9	3	6
Olympic Games
Gold medal – first place	2018 Pyeongchang	7.5 km sprint
Gold medal – first place	2018 Pyeongchang	10 km pursuit
Bronze medal – third place	2018 Pyeongchang	15 km individual
World Championships
Gold medal – first place	2015 Kontiolahti	4 × 6 km relay
Gold medal – first place	2016 Oslo	10 km pursuit
Gold medal – first place	2017 Hochfilzen	10 km pursuit
Gold medal – first place	2017 Hochfilzen	15 km individual
Gold medal – first place	2017 Hochfilzen	12.5 km mass start
Gold medal – first place	2017 Hochfilzen	4 × 6 km relay
Gold medal – first place	2017 Hochfilzen	Mixed relay
Silver medal – second place	2015 Kontiolahti	10 km pursuit
Silver medal – second place	2016 Oslo	12.5 km mass start
Silver medal – second place	2017 Hochfilzen	7.5 km sprint
Bronze medal – third place	2016 Oslo	15 km individual
Bronze medal – third place	2016 Oslo	7.5 km sprint
Bronze medal – third place	2016 Oslo	4 × 6 km relay
Bronze medal – third place	2019 Östersund	7.5 km sprint
Bronze medal – third place	2019 Östersund	10 km pursuit
World Cup
Event	1st	2nd	3rd
Sprint	4	9	4
Pursuit	11	4	3
Mass Start	4	5	2
Individual	3	0	2
Relay	12	3	3
Mixed Relay	1	1	0
Total	35	22	14
- WC podiums including the Olympic games and World championships races
Junior World Championships
Gold medal – first place	2013 Obertilliach	12.5 km individual
Gold medal – first place	2013 Obertilliach	7.5 km sprint
Gold medal – first place	2013 Obertilliach	3 × 6 km relay
Silver medal – second place	2013 Obertilliach	10 km pursuit
Bronze medal – third place	2011 Nové Město	10 km pursuit
Bronze medal – third place	2011 Nové Město	3 × 6 km relay
European Youth Olympic Winter Festival
Gold medal – first place	2011 Liberec	10 km individual
Gold medal – first place	2011 Liberec	6 km sprint
Gold medal – first place	2011 Liberec	Mixed relay

Laura Dahlmeier (German: [ˈlaʊʁa ˈdaːlˌmaɪɐ]; 22 August 1993 – 28 July 2025) was a German biathlete. Dahlmeier started in her first World Cup races in the 2012–13 season. In 2014, she participated in the Winter Olympics in Sochi. She won a record of five gold medals at the World Championships of 2017. In 2018, she became the first woman to win the biathlon sprint and pursuit in the same Olympics. During her career she won a total of two golds and one bronze at the Olympics, seven gold medals, three silver medals and five bronze medals at World Championships, one overall World Cup and two discipline World Cup titles.

Dahlmeier announced her retirement from competition in May 2019, at the age of 25. She died on 28 July 2025 in a mountaineering accident in northern Pakistan.

== Early life ==
Dahlmeier was born on 22 August 1993, in the Bavarian ski-town of Garmisch-Partenkirchen as the first child of Andreas and Susi Dahlmeier. She had a brother, five years younger, named Pirmin. She began skiing at a young age, took up biathlon by the age of 7, excelled as a teenaged biathlete at the age of 17 and won gold in all three races (10 km individual, 6 km sprint, and the mixed relay) at the 2011 European Youth Olympic Winter Festival in Liberec. In this year she also passed her high school diploma at the St. Irmengard-Gymnasium with an average of 1.9 (very good) and became a member of "Zoll-Ski-Team Germany", where she could combine a professional education with a biathlon career. Her father runs a furniture store and is also a passionate climber, skier and mountain-rescue volunteer. Her mother and her aunt were both professional downhill mountain bikers, winning titles. After their retirement, they opened shops, Laura's mother as a goldsmith, her aunt as a hairstylist.

== Career ==
=== Biathlon career ===
At the 2013 Biathlon Junior World Championships in Obertilliach, Austria, Dahlmeier took three gold medals in the individual, sprint and relay, as well as a silver in the pursuit. Following this, she was selected for the German team in the women's relay at the 2013 Biathlon World Championships: racing in the third leg, she shot clean and overcame a 38-second deficit to hand over with Germany in the lead. Dahlmeier completed her first full World Cup campaign the following season: she enjoyed further success in World Cup relays, however she was unable to secure a solo podium finish, and did not make an impact at the 2014 Winter Olympics in Sochi, Russia.

Dahlmeier's start to her 2014–15 season was delayed due to a mountain accident at the Zugspitze, caused by a broken mountain flake, where she suffered a broken bone and a torn ligament. Because of that she made her World Cup season debut at Pokljuka in December 2014. Two months later she took her first World Cup win in Nové Město na Moravě, following which she took another six podiums, including a second win, and her first two senior World Championship medals, a silver in the pursuit and a gold in the women's relay.

In 2015–16, she took five World Cup wins, and at the World Championships in Oslo she took her first solo gold medal in the pursuit along with a silver in the mass start and bronzes in the sprint, individual and women's relay.

Dahlmeier enjoyed her best season in 2016–17, winning the overall World Cup and winning five golds and a silver at the World Championships in Hochfilzen, Austria, missing out on a sixth gold by four seconds in the sprint to Gabriela Koukalová. She became the first woman in biathlon history to win five gold medals at a World Championships.

The following season Dahlmeier's focus was on the 2018 Winter Olympics in Pyeongchang: At the Games she became the second German woman to take the Olympic gold in the sprint, shooting clean as one of only three competitors to hit all targets in windy conditions, before doubling up with a second title in the pursuit and additionally taking a bronze in the individual. Dahlmeier received the Silver Laurel Leaf shortly after she won her first Olympic gold medal. She was the first female biathlete to win sprint and pursuit gold medals at the same Winter Olympics.

Dahlmeier's 2018–19 season was postponed by a mountain bike accident, where a cut wound had to be stitched, a tooth removal and a subsequent infection. However, she took a World Cup race win at Antholz in January 2019 before going on to take two bronzes at the 2019 World Championships in Östersund in the sprint and the pursuit. In May 2019, after the end of the season, she announced her retirement from competition, stating that she no longer felt the 100% passion necessary for professional biathlon. She had her last biathlon competition after six months of retirement the 29th of December 2019 at the "Arena of Schalke" in Gelsenkirchen. She achieved a very good result with only one shot of forty missing the target and a very good lap time.

=== Post-biathlon career ===
On 18 October 2019, Dahlmeier released the children's book Die Klima Gang: Laura Dahlmeier und Freunde im Einsatz für die Natur, which she co-authored (The Climate Gang: Laura Dahlmeier and Friends in Action for Nature).

For the 2019–20 Biathlon World Cup season, she served as an expert commentator for the German broadcaster ZDF and as a winter sport brand ambassador for BMW. In 2019, she started studying sport science at the Technical University of Munich.

After retiring from competitive biathlon, Dahlmeier competed in mountain running. In June 2019 she won the 39-kilometer Basetrail XL race of the Zugspitz Ultratrail in Grainau, Germany. In September 2019 she won and set a new women's course record in the 52-kilometer Karwendelmarsch race from Scharnitz to Pertisau in Austria. In November of that year she placed 27th at the 2019 World Long Distance Mountain Running Championships in Argentina.

In April 2023 Dahlmeier passed the exam "state-certified ski and mountain guide". From then she leads occasionally groups through the mountains around Garmisch-Partenkirchen. The same year she released her second book, Wenn ich was mach, mach ich's gscheidt. From 2011 until her death, she was a volunteer for the Garmisch-Partenkirchen mountain rescue team.

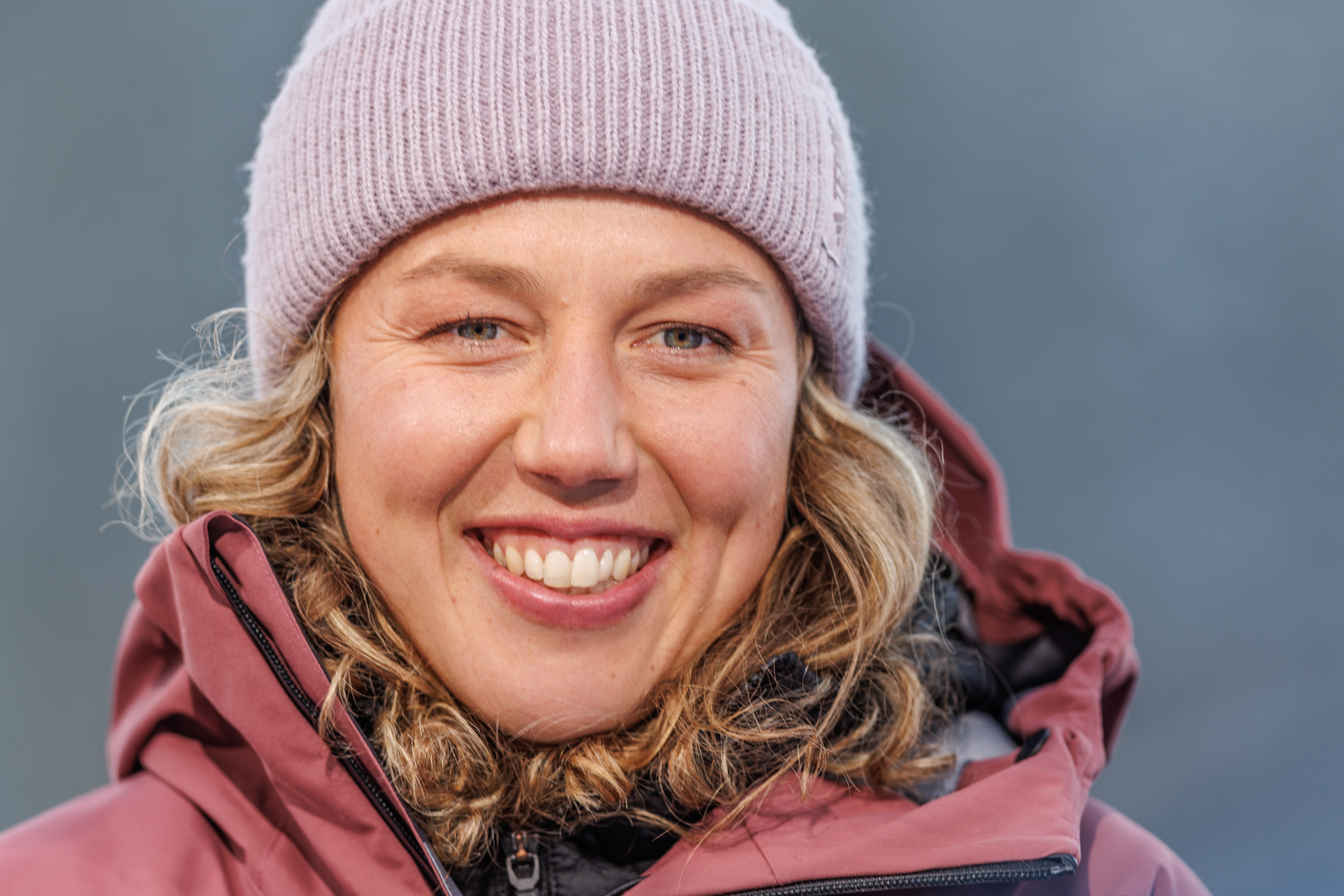
Dahlmeier in 2025

== Death ==
After having conquered successfully the Great Trango Tower (6,286 m) on 8 July, Dahlmeier died on 28 July 2025 in a rockfall accident. She and her rope partner Marina Krauss were climbing Laila Peak in the Karakoram mountain range in Pakistan. According to Krauss, who was waiting some distance below Dahlmeier at the time of the accident, the weather conditions at the beginning of the early morning ascend had been cold and dry. Two hundred meters below the summit, they realized that air humidity and temperature had increased rapidly, and they decided to turn back before reaching the summit to avoid the dangers of rockfall and icefall. On their way down, a rockfall occurred. Dahlmeier was hit on the head by a large rock and thrown against the face of the mountain, leaving her unresponsive and in a position where Krauss could not reach her. She was killed instantly. Marina Krauss reported that she climbed to Laura to get a sky telephone and call for help, but saw that her helmet had been broken into pieces and her head was seriously injured.

It was initially believed that Dahlmeier may have survived, so a rescue operation was launched, but crews were unable to get to her location due to danger of rockfall. They could only spot Laura from the helicopter and saw no signs of life. On 30 July 2025, Dahlmeier's management confirmed that she had died during the accident; they also said Dahlmeier had expressly wished that no-one risk their life to recover her in case of an accident, and that her body should remain on the mountain.

On several mountains in the region, the remains of a number of climbers who perished in accidents have been left behind, where recovery was particularly challenging due to the difficult terrain or bad weather conditions. The ongoing border conflict with India further complicated recovery efforts, as only the Pakistani military was permitted to operate helicopters in the area.

An unnamed park in Garmisch-Partenkirchen was officially named Laura Dahlmeier Park on 27 February 2026, according to the decision of the municipal council on 24 September 2025 in coordination with the family of the deceased biathlon Olympic champion. A memorial already commemorates the honorary citizen there. A final recovery attempt failed, because the body was untraceable, although Thomas Huber and Andreas Dahlmeier searched parts of the mountain with a camera drone and a telescope with 30x magnification. It is suspected that her body has fallen into a glacier crevasse and is now covered with rock rubble. Laura’s father said, "We would have liked to bring Laura home to avoid that people try to make photos of her. But it wasn’t possible to recover her. It was too dangerous directly after the accident."

== Biathlon results ==
All results are sourced from the International Biathlon Union. On 17 May 2019, she announced her retirement from biathlon.

=== Olympic Games ===
3 medals (2 gold, 1 bronze)

Year	Age	Individual	Sprint	Pursuit	Mass start	Relay	Mixed relay	Single mixed relay
(Russia) 2014 Sochi	20	13th	46th	30th	—	10th	DSQ	—N/a
(South Korea) 2018 Pyeongchang	24	Bronze	Gold	Gold	16th	8th	4th	—N/a

*The mixed relay was added as an event in 2014.

=== World Championships ===
15 medals (7 gold, 3 silver, 5 bronze)

Year	Age	Individual	Sprint	Pursuit	Mass start	Relay	Mixed relay	Single mixed relay
(Czech Republic) 2013 Nové Město	19	—	—	—	—	5th	—	—N/a
(Finland) 2015 Kontiolahti	21	6th	4th	Silver	7th	Gold	—	—N/a
(Norway) 2016 Oslo	22	Bronze	Bronze	Gold	Silver	Bronze	—	—N/a
(Austria) 2017 Hochfilzen	23	Gold	Silver	Gold	Gold	Gold	Gold	—N/a
(Sweden) 2019 Östersund	25	4th	Bronze	Bronze	6th	4th	—	—

*During Olympic seasons competitions are only held for those events not included in the Olympic program.
**The single mixed relay was added as an event in 2019.

=== Junior World Championships ===
Year	Age	Sprint	Pursuit	Relay	Mixed relay
(Czech Republic) 2011 Nové Město	17	12th	14th	Bronze	Bronze
(Finland) 2012 Kontiolahti	18	16th	37th	34th	6th
(Austria) 2013 Obertilliach	19	Gold	Gold	Silver	Gold

=== European Youth Olympic Winter Festival ===
Year	Age	Individual	Sprint	Mixed relay
(Czech Republic) 2011 Liberec	17	Gold	Gold	Gold

=== World Cup ===
Season	Age	Overall			Individual		Sprint		Pursuit		Mass start	
Season	Age	Races	Points	Position	Points	Position	Points	Position	Points	Position	Points	Position
2012–13	19	7/26	220	35th	—	—	101	32nd	69	36th	50	29th
2013–14	20	17/22	410	15th	54	12th	138	23rd	145	14th	73	14th
2014–15	21	17/25	725	8th	81	8th	292	8th	224	4th	128	12th
2015–16	22	18/25	786	6th	80	10th	213	9th	265	5th	228	3rd
2016–17	23	24/26	1211	1st	180	1st	372	2nd	411	1st	254	2nd
2017–18	24	19/22	730	4th	—	—	252	4th	271	3rd	207	2nd
2018–19	25	15/25	554	12th	75	9th	191	10th	163	14th	125	13th

=== Shooting statistics ===
Season	Overall	Individual	Sprint	Pursuit	Mass Start	Relay
2012–13	90.0 (117/130)	0 (0/0)	96.7 (29/30)	82.5 (33/40)	87.5 (35/40)	99.9 (20/20)
2013–14	90.8 (336/370)	93.3 (56/60)	87.1 (61/70)	90.7 (127/140)	86.7 (52/60)	99.9(40/40)
2014–15	92.7 (290/313)	95.0 (38/40)	90.0 (63/70)	92.0 (92/100)	95.0 (57/60)	93.0 (40/43)
2015–16	91.6 (294/321)	90.0 (36/40)	85.0 (51/60)	95.0 (95/100)	92.0 (92/100)	95.2 (20/21)
2016–17	88.6 (444/501)	91.7 (55/60)	91.3 (73/80)	90.6 (145/160)	91.0 (91/100)	79.2 (80/101)
2017–18	90.6 (396/437)	87.5 (35/40)	90.0 (72/80)	94.3 (132/140)	89.2 (107/120)	87.7 (50/57)
2018–19	87.2 (251/288)	92.5 (37/40)	94.0 (47/50)	91.3 (73/80)	81.3 (65/80)	76.3 (29/38)

Key:Hits/shots, percentage. Results in all IBU World Cup races including relay events.

=== Individual victories ===
- 22 victories – (4 SP, 11 PU, 3 IN, 4 MS)

No.	Season	Date	Location	Race	Level
1	2014–15	7 February 2015	Nové Město, Czech Republic	7.5 km Sprint	World Cup
2	2014–15	17 March 2015	Khanty-Mansiysk, Russia	12.5 km Mass start	World Cup
3	2015–16	12 December 2015	Hochfilzen, Austria	10 km Pursuit	World Cup
4	2015–16	19 December 2015	Pokljuka, Slovenia	10 km Pursuit	World Cup
5	2015–16	9 January 2016	Ruhpolding, Germany	10 km Pursuit	World Cup
6	2015–16	10 January 2016	Ruhpolding, Germany	12.5 km Mass Start	World Cup
7	2015–16	6 March 2016	Holmenkollen, Norway	10 km Pursuit	World Championships
8	2016–17	30 November 2016	Östersund, Sweden	15 km Individual	World Cup
9	2016–17	9 December 2016	Pokljuka, Slovenia	7.5 km Sprint	World Cup
10	2016–17	10 December 2016	Pokljuka, Slovenia	10 km Pursuit	World Cup
11	2016–17	19 January 2017	Antholz, Italy	15 km Individual	World Cup
12	2016–17	12 February 2017	Hochfilzen, Austria	10 km Pursuit	World Championships
13	2016–17	15 February 2017	Hochfilzen, Austria	15 km Individual	World Championships
14	2016–17	19 February 2017	Hochfilzen, Austria	12.5 km Mass Start	World Championships
15	2016–17	2 March 2017	Pyeongchang, South Korea	7.5 km Sprint	World Cup
16	2016–17	4 March 2017	Pyeongchang, South Korea	10 km Pursuit	World Cup
17	2016–17	11 March 2017	Kontiolahti, Finland	10 km Pursuit	World Cup
18	2017–18	16 December 2017	Annecy, France	10 km Pursuit	World Cup
19	2017–18	20 January 2018	Antholz, Italy	10 km Pursuit	World Cup
20	2017–18	10 February 2018	Pyeongchang, South Korea	7.5 km Sprint	Winter Olympic Games
21	2017–18	12 February 2018	Pyeongchang, South Korea	10 km Pursuit	Winter Olympic Games
22	2018–19	27 January 2019	Antholz-Anterselva, Italy	12.5 km Mass Start	World Cup

*Results are from IBU races which include the Biathlon World Cup, Biathlon World Championships and the Winter Olympic Games.

=== Relay victories ===
No.	Season	Date	Location	Level	Teammate
1	2012–13	10 March 2013	Sochi, Russia	World Cup	Henkel, Sachenbacher-Stehle, Neureuther
2	2013–14	12 December 2013	Le Grand-Bornand, France	World Cup	Henkel, Preuss, Hildebrand
3	2013–14	8 January 2014	Ruhpolding, Germany	World Cup	Sachenbacher-Stehle, Preuss, Hildebrand
4	2014–15	25 January 2015	Antholz, Italy	World Cup	Kummer, Preuss, Hildebrand
5	2014–15	13 March 2015	Kontiolahti, Finland	World Championships	Hinz, Preuss, Hildebrand
6	2016–17	11 December 2016	Pokljuka, Slovenia	World Cup	Hinz, Hammerschmidt, Hildebrand
7	2016–17	12 January 2017	Ruhpolding, Germany	World Cup	Hinz, Hammerschmidt, Preuss
8	2016–17	22 January 2017	Antholz, Italy	World Cup	Hinz, Hammerschmidt, Hildebrand
9	2016–17	9 February 2017	Hochfilzen, Austria	World Championships	Hinz, Peiffer, Schempp
10	2016–17	17 February 2017	Hochfilzen, Austria	World Championships	Hinz, Hammerschmidt, Hildebrand)
11	2017–18	10 December 2017	Hochfilzen, Austria	World Cup	Hinz, Hildebrand, Hammerschmidt
12	2017–18	13 January 2018	Ruhpolding, Germany	World Cup	Preuss, Herrmann-Wick, Hildebrand
13	2018–19	8 February 2019	Canmore, Canada	World Cup	Hildebrand, Hinz, Herrmann-Wick

=== Overall record ===
Result	Individual	Sprint	Pursuit	Mass start	Relay	Mixed relay	Total		
Result	Individual	Sprint	Pursuit	Mass start	Relay	Mixed relay	Individual events	Team events	All events
1st place	3	4	11	4	12	1	22	13	35
2nd place	–	9	4	5	3	1	18	4	22
3rd place	2	4	3	2	3	–	11	3	14
Podiums	5	17	18	11	18	2	51	20	71
4–10	5	13	13	9	4	1	40	5	45
11–20	3	6	6	4	1	–	19	1	20
21–40	–	7	2	3	–	–	12	-	12
41–60	1	1	1	–	–	–	3	-	3
Others	–	–	–	–	–	–	-	-	0
DNS	1	–	–	–	–	–	1	-	1
DNF	–	–	–	–	–	–	-	-	0
DSQ	–	–	–	–	–	1	-	1	1
Starts	15	44	40	27	23	4	126	27	153

* Results in IBU World Cup races, Olympics and World Championships.

Awards
Preceded by Angelique Kerber	German Sportswoman of the Year; 2017	Succeeded by Angelique Kerber
