= Eita (name) =

Eita (written: 瑛太, 英太, 英多, 栄太 or 永太) is a Japanese male given name. The meaning of the name varies depending on which kanji is used to write the name.

== People ==
- Eita (wrestler) (小林 瑛太, born 1991), Japanese professional wrestler
- Eita Mizuno (水野 英多), Japanese manga artist
- Eita Mori (森 栄太, born 1983), Japanese sports shooter
- Eita Nagayama (永山 瑛太, born 1982), Japanese actor also known mononymously as Eita

== Fictional characters ==
- Eita Otoya, a character from the manga and anime Blue Lock
- Eita Takei (武井 永太), a character from the manga and anime Chihayafuru
- Eita Semi (瀬見 英太), a character from the manga and anime Haikyu!! with the position of setter from Shiratorizawa Academy
