= Wang Xuelan =

Chinese biathlete (born 1996)

Personal information
- Nationality: Chinese
- Born: 1 February 1996 (age 29); Tonghua

Sport
- Country: China
- Sport: Biathlon

Wang Xuelan (born 1 February 1996) is a Chinese biathlete. She was born in Tonghua. She represented China at the Biathlon World Championships 2016.
