= Aita Ighodaro =

British author

- Born: London, UK
- Education: Oxford University
- Occupations: Author, Art Collector, Consultant
- Writing career
- Genre: Romance
- Notable works: Sin Tropez, All that Glitters

Aita Ighodaro is a British author with two published books, Sin Tropez and All that Glitters, a journalist, an art collector with the Tate Africa Acquisitions Committee, and a former model.

== Early life and education ==
Ighodaro was born in London in 1983 to a family of Nigerian and Sierra Leonean descent. She studied Modern and Medieval Languages at Oxford University.

== Career ==
While studying at Oxford University, Ighodaro worked as a fashion model for a year attending shoots in St Tropez and Cannes. After Oxford she worked in the television industry and has written for several national newspapers and magazines including the Independent and the Sunday Express. On graduating from Oxford, Ighodaro wrote two novels. Sin Tropez, published by Corvus, Atlantic Books in December 2010, and All That Glitters, published in November, 2012.

In 2012, Ighodaro founded Idaro, a consulting firm with a focus on business and investment with Sub-Saharan Africa.
