= Arita (surname) =

Arita (written: 有田 or 蟻田) is a Japanese surname. Notable people with the surname include:

- Hachirō Arita (有田 八郎, 1884–1965), Japanese politician and diplomat
- Isao Arita (蟻田 功, 1926–2023), Japanese physician known for smallpox eradication
- Koki Arita (有田 光希, born 1991), Japanese footballer
- Taiji Arita (有田 泰而, 1941–2011), Japanese photographer
- Teppei Arita (有田 哲平, born 1971), Japanese comedian and television presenter
