= Madeleine Phaneuf =

American biathlete (born 1995)

Personal information
- Born: 29 April 1995 (age 31)

Sport

Professional information
- Sport: Biathlon
- Club: Polar Bear
- World Cup debut: 2017

Olympic Games
- Teams: 1
- Medals: 0

World Championships
- Teams: 1 (2017)
- Medals: 0

World Cup
- Seasons: 1 (2016/17–)
- Individual victories: 0
- All victories: 0
- Individual podiums: 0
- All podiums: 0

Madeleine Phaneuf (born 29 April 1995 in Fairfax, Virginia) is an American biathlete.

== Biathlon results ==
All results are sourced from the International Biathlon Union.

=== World Championships ===
Event	Individual	Sprint	Pursuit	Mass start	Relay	Mixed relay
(Austria) 2017 Hochfilzen	87th	78th	—	—	14th	—

=== World Cup ===
Season	Overall		Individual		Sprint		Pursuit		Mass start	
Season	Points	Position	Points	Position	Points	Position	Points	Position	Points	Position
2016–17	0	—	0	—	0	—	0	—	0	—
