= Aita Gasparin =

Swiss biathlete (born 1994)

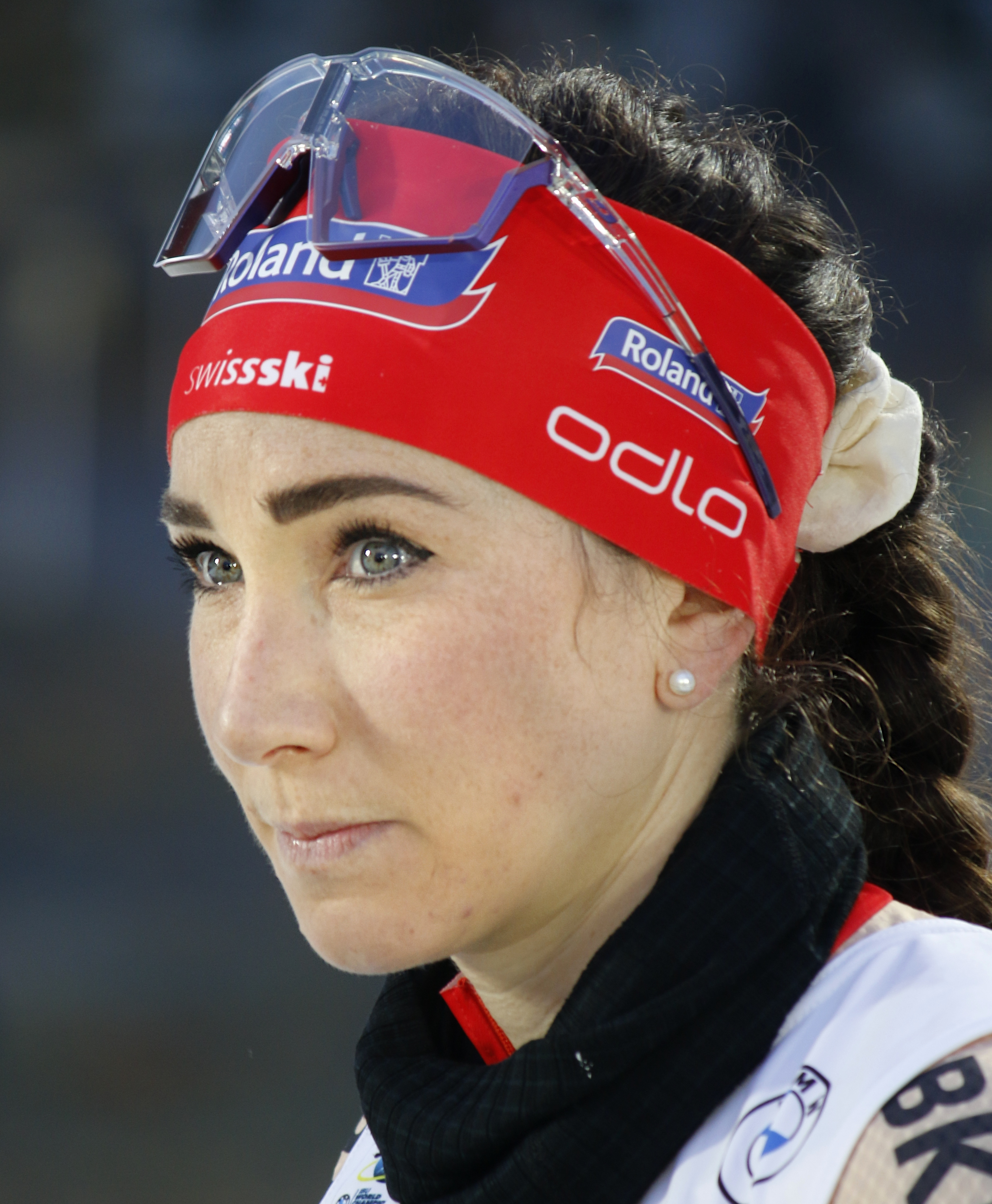
Aita Gasparin in 2024.

Aita Gasparin (born 9 February 1994 in Samedan) is a Swiss biathlete. She competed at the Biathlon World Championships 2013, and at the 2014 Winter Olympics in Sochi, in the individual contest.

She is the sister of fellow biathletes Selina Gasparin and Elisa Gasparin.

== Biathlon results ==
All results are sourced from the International Biathlon Union.

=== Olympic Games ===
0 medals

Event	Individual	Sprint	Pursuit	Mass start	Relay	Mixed relay
(Russia) 2014 Sochi	62nd	—	—	—	8th	—
(South Korea) 2018 Pyeongchang	68th	—	—	—	—	—
(Italy) 2026 Milano Cortina	35th	55th	44th	—	8th	—

=== World Championships ===
0 medals

Event	Individual	Sprint	Pursuit	Mass start	Relay	Mixed relay	Single mixed relay
(Czech Republic) 2013 Nové Město	84th	94th	—	—	—	—	—
(Finland) 2015 Kontiolahti	78th	80th	—	—	21st	13th	—
(Norway) 2016 Oslo	63rd	73rd	—	—	16th	14th	—
(Austria) 2017 Hochfilzen	28th	48th	50th	—	13th	14th	—
(Sweden) 2019 Östersund	—	75th	—	—	13th	—	14th
(Italy) 2020 Rasen-Antholz	27th	10th	10th	21st	6th	—	—
(Slovenia) 2021 Pokljuka	—	33rd	35th	—	12th	—	—
(Germany) 2023 Oberhof	27th	20th	38th	30th	8th	—	—
(Czech Republic) 2024 Nové Město na Moravě	46th	62nd	—	—	9th	—	—
(Switzerland) 2025 Lenzerheide	20th	41st	21st	11th	14th	—	—

*During Olympic seasons competitions are only held for those events not included in the Olympic program.
**The single mixed relay was added as an event in 2019.
