= Rosanna Crawford =

Canadian biathlete

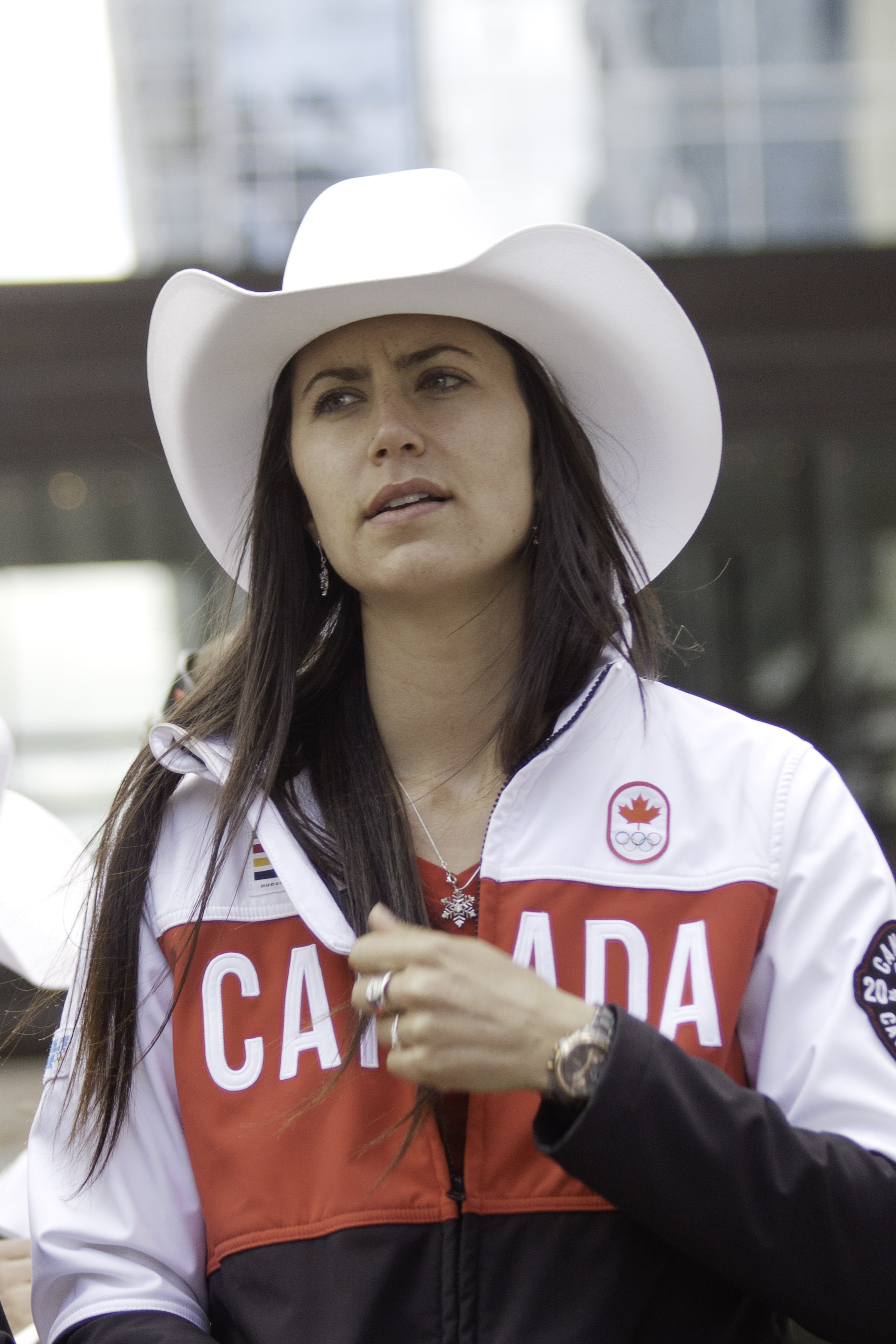
- Crawford in Parade of Excellence, Calgary, 2014

Personal information
- Full name: Rosanna Crawford
- Born: 23 May 1988 (age 38) Canmore, Alberta, Canada

Sport

Professional information
- Sport: Biathlon
- Club: Canmore Nordic Ski Club
- World Cup debut: 13 January 2010

Olympic Games
- Teams: 3 (2010, 2014, 2018)
- Medals: 0

World Championships
- Teams: 2 (2013, 2015)
- Medals: 0

World Cup
- Seasons: 6 (2009/10–)
- Individual podiums: 1
Medal record
Women's biathlon
Bronze medal – third place	2017/18 World Cup	Ruhpolding Individual 15 km
- Updated on 11 January 2018

Rosanna Crawford (born 23 May 1988) is a Canadian biathlete.

== Career ==
Crawford competed at the 2010 Winter Olympics in Vancouver in the women's sprint (7.5 km) and individual (15 km) competitions. She placed 72nd in the sprint on 13 February 2010 with a time of 23:04.6 and no penalties resulting in a +3:09.0 deficit. At the 2014 Winter Olympics in Sochi she was part of the women's relay team which finished eighth, Canada's best ever finish in this Olympic event.

Crawford was named as Biathlon Canada's Female Athlete of the Year for the 2012-13 season.

=== 2018 Winter Olympics ===
In January 2018, Crawford was named to Canada's 2018 Olympic team where she finished 53rd in the women's sprint.

== Personal ==
She was part of a group of five athletes who posed for the Bold Beautiful Biathlon calendar. Her older sister is Chandra Crawford, who won the gold medal in the cross-country sprint at the 2006 Winter Olympics.

== Biathlon results ==
All results are sourced from the International Biathlon Union.

=== Olympic Games ===
0 medal

Event	Individual	Sprint	Pursuit	Mass start	Relay	Mixed relay
(Canada) 2010 Vancouver	75th	71st	—	—	14th	—N/a
(Russia) 2014 Sochi	66th	25th	45th	—	8th	11th
(South Korea) 2018 Pyeongchang	26th	53rd	19th	—	10th	12th

*The mixed relay was added as an event in 2014.

=== World Championships ===
0 medal

Event	Individual	Sprint	Pursuit	Mass start	Relay	Mixed relay	Single mixed relay
(Czech Republic) 2013 Nové Město	17th	77th	—	—	12th	14th	—N/a
(Finland) 2015 Kontiolahti	87th	31st	24th	—	9th	12th	—N/a
(Norway) 2016 Oslo Holmenkollen	14th	29th	27th	15th	15th	11th	—N/a
(Austria) 2017 Hochfilzen	62nd	26th	43rd	—	16th	13th	—N/a
(Sweden) 2019 Östersund	63rd	18th	LAP	-	14th	16th	-

*During Olympic seasons competitions are only held for those events not included in the Olympic program.
**The single mixed relay was added as an event in 2019.

=== World Cup ===
Event	Sprint	Mass start	Relay	Mixed Relay	Individual	Pursuit
(Germany) 2017/18 Ruhpolding	-	4th	10th	-	3rd	-
(France) 2017/18 Annecy	60th	-	-	-	-	DNS
(Austria) 2017/18 Hochfilzen	49th	-	-	-	9th	39th
