= 2014–15 Biathlon World Cup – Relay Women =

The 2014–15 Biathlon World Cup – Relay Women started on Saturday December 13, 2014 in Hochfilzen and finished on Friday, March 13, 2015 at the World Championships in Kontiolahti. The defending titlist Germany finished on the 2nd place. The title was won by the Czech Republic.

== Competition format ==
The relay teams consist of four biathletes, who each ski 6 kilometres (3.7 mi), each leg skied over three laps, with two shooting rounds; one prone, one standing. For every round of five targets there are eight bullets available, though the last three can only be single-loaded manually one at a time from spare round holders or bullets deposited by the competitor into trays or onto the mat at the firing line. If after eight bullets there are still misses, one 150 m penalty loop must be taken for each missed target remaining. The first-leg participants start all at the same time, and as in cross-country skiing relays, every athlete of a team must touch the team's next-leg participant to perform a valid changeover. On the first shooting stage of the first leg, the participant must shoot in the lane corresponding to their bib number (Bib #10 shoots at lane #10 regardless of position in race.), then for the remainder of the relay, the relay team shoots at the lane in the position they arrived (Arrive at the range in 5th place, you shoot at lane five.).

== 2013–14 Top 3 Standings ==
Medal	Country	Points
Gold:	Germany	174
Silver:	Ukraine	162
Bronze:	Norway	142

== Medal winners ==
Event:	Gold:	Time	Silver:	Time	Bronze:	Time
Hochfilzen details	Germany; Luise Kummer; Franziska Hildebrand; Vanessa Hinz; Franziska Preuß	1:11:40.4 (0+0) (0+1) (0+1) (0+3) (0+0) (0+2) (0+0) (0+1)	Belarus; Nadezhda Skardino; Nastassia Dubarezava; Nadzeya Pisareva; Darya Domracheva	1:12:01.5 (0+1) (0+0) (0+1) (0+3) (0+2) (0+2) (0+0) (0+1)	Czech Republic; Eva Puskarčíková; Gabriela Soukalová; Jitka Landová; Veronika Vítková	1:12:02.6 (0+1) (0+0) (0+0) (0+3) (0+1) (0+2) (0+1) (0+1)
Oberhof details	Czech Republic; Eva Puskarčíková; Gabriela Soukalová; Jitka Landová; Veronika Vítková	1:16:56.0 (0+0) (0+1) (0+1) (0+0) (0+1) (0+1) (0+1) (0+2)	France; Marine Bolliet; Marie Dorin Habert; Justine Braisaz; Anaïs Bescond	1:17:04.9 (0+1) (0+1) (0+1) (0+0) (0+1) (0+2) (0+0) (0+2)	Belarus; Nadezhda Skardino; Nastassia Dubarezava; Nadzeya Pisarava; Darya Domracheva	1:18:02.8 (0+0) (0+0) (0+0) (0+3) (0+0) (1+3) (0+1) (0+1)
Ruhpolding details	Czech Republic; Eva Puskarčíková; Gabriela Soukalová; Jitka Landová; Veronika Vítková	1:23:57.7 (0+0) (0+0) (0+1) (0+2) (0+3) (0+1) (0+1) (0+1)	Belarus; Nadezhda Skardino; Iryna Kryuko; Nadzeya Pisareva; Darya Domracheva	1:25:11.0 (0+0) (0+2) (0+0) (0+0) (0+1) (0+2) (0+0) (0+1)	Germany; Franziska Preuß; Franziska Hildebrand; Vanessa Hinz; Laura Dahlmeier	1:25:37.0 (0+0) (1+3) (0+0) (0+2) (0+0) (0+1) (0+0) (0+0)
Antholz details	Germany; Franziska Hildebrand; Franziska Preuß; Luise Kummer; Laura Dahlmeier	1:18:47.7 (0+0) (2+3) (0+0) (0+3) (0+2) (0+2) (0+0) (0+0)	Czech Republic; Eva Puskarčíková; Gabriela Soukalová; Jitka Landová; Veronika Vítková	1:19:22.7 (0+2) (0+1) (0+1) (0+3) (0+3) (0+3) (0+1) (0+1)	Ukraine; Juliya Dzhyma; Natalya Burdyga; Olga Abramova; Valj Semerenko	1:19:33.0 (0+1) (0+2) (0+1) (0+3) (3+3) (0+0) (0+2) (0+2)
Holmenkollen details	Czech Republic; Eva Puskarčíková; Gabriela Soukalová; Jitka Landová; Veronika Vítková	1:11:10.6 (0+1) (0+0) (0+1) (0+0) (0+0) (0+0) (0+2) (0+1)	Italy; Dorothea Wierer; Nicole Gontier; Federica Sanfilippo; Karin Oberhofer	1:11:38.9 (0+0) (0+0) (0+1) (0+0) (0+0) (0+1) (0+0) (0+0)	France; Anaïs Bescond; Enora Latuillière; Coline Varcin; Marie Dorin Habert	1:11:56.5 (0+1) (0+1) (0+3) (0+0) (0+0) (0+0) (0+0) (0+0)
Kontiolahti details	Germany; Franziska Hildebrand; Franziska Preuß; Vanessa Hinz; Laura Dahlmeier	1:11:54.6 (0+0) (0+2) (0+1) (0+2) (0+0) (0+1) (0+0) (0+0)	France; Anaïs Bescond; Enora Latuillière; Justine Braisaz; Marie Dorin Habert	1:12:54.9 (0+0) (0+1) (0+1) (0+1) (1+3) (0+1) (0+2) (0+0)	Italy; Lisa Vittozzi; Karin Oberhofer; Nicole Gontier; Dorothea Wierer	1:13:00.7 (0+0) (0+0) (0+1) (0+3) (0+2) (0+2) (0+0) (0+1)

== Standings ==
#	Name	HOC	OBE	RUH	ANT	HOL	WCH	Total
1	Czech Republic	48	60	60	54	60	34	316
2	Germany	60	31	48	60	43	60	302
3	France	32	54	38	40	48	54	266
4	Belarus	54	48	54	38	32	36	262
5	Italy	43	40	32	36	54	48	253
6	Ukraine	36	38	40	48	38	38	238
7	Norway	40	43	43	30	36	40	232
8	Russia	34	36	34	43	40	43	230
9	Poland	38	32	36	32	30	28	196
10	Canada	30	24	30	31	34	31	180
11	Austria	28	34	31	27	22	30	172
12	Sweden	29	28	29	23	28	32	169
13	Switzerland	25	26	28	34	27	19	159
14	Slovakia	26	27	27	24	31	22	157
15	Kazakhstan	27	29	23	25	24	27	155
16	Romania	24	22	26	26	25	26	149
17	Estonia	23	25	21	DNS	29	25	123
17	Lithuania	20	20	20	22	21	20	123
19	Bulgaria	22	23	24	28	—	17	114
20	United States	—	—	22	29	23	29	103
21	South Korea	21	21	19	21	—	16	98
22	Finland	DNF	30	25	—	—	24	79
23	Slovenia	31	—	—	—	26	18	75
24	China	19	—	—	—	—	23	42
25	Japan	—	—	—	—	—	21	21
