= 2014–15 Biathlon World Cup – Mass start Women =

The 2014–15 Biathlon World Cup – Mass start Women started on Sunday December 21, 2014 in Pokljuka and finished on Sunday March 22, 2015 in Khanty-Mansiysk. Defending titlist Darya Domracheva of Belarus finished in 3rd place. Franziska Preuß of Germany won the title.

== Competition format ==
World Cup Mass starts are held with only the 30 top ranking athletes on the start line. All biathletes start at the same time and the first across the finish line wins. The distance of 12.5 kilometres (7.8 mi) is skied over five laps; there are four bouts of shooting (two prone, two standing, in that order) with the first shooting bout being at the lane corresponding to the competitor's bib number (Bib #10 shoots at lane #10 regardless of position in race), with the rest of the shooting bouts being on a first-come, first-served basis (If a competitor arrives at the lane in fifth place, they shoot at lane 5). As in sprint and pursuit, competitors must ski one 150 metres (490 ft) penalty loop for each miss.

== 2013-14 Top 3 Standings ==
Medal	Athlete	Points
Gold:	(Belarus) Darya Domracheva	151
Silver:	(Slovakia) Anastasiya Kuzmina	139
Bronze:	(Finland) Kaisa Mäkäräinen	130

== Medal winners ==
Event:	Gold:	Time	Silver:	Time	Bronze:	Time
Pokljuka details	Kaisa Mäkäräinen; Finland	34:18.8 (0+0+2+0)	Anaïs Bescond; France	34:26.4 (0+0+0+0)	Nadezhda Skardino; Belarus	34:34.6 (0+0+0+0)
Oberhof details	Darya Domracheva; Belarus	42:36.6 (2+1+0+1)	Veronika Vítková; Czech Republic	42:51.5 (1+0+0+1)	Tiril Eckhoff; Norway	42:58.3 (1+1+0+0)
Ruhpolding details	Darya Domracheva; Belarus	35:17.5 (1+0+2+0)	Franziska Preuß; Germany	35:34.0 (0+1+1+0)	Veronika Vítková; Czech Republic	35:40.4 (1+1+1+0)
Kontiolahti details	Valj Semerenko; Ukraine	34:32.9 (0+0+0+0)	Franziska Preuß; Germany	34:39.1 (0+0+0+1)	Karin Oberhofer; Italy	34:45.5 (1+1+0+0)
Khanty-Mansiysk details	Laura Dahlmeier; Germany	35:08.2 (0+0+0+0)	Gabriela Soukalová; Czech Republic	35:15.3 (0+0+0+0)	Marie Dorin Habert; France	35:28.1 (0+0+1+1)

== Standings ==
#	Name	POK	OBE	RUH	WCH	KHA	Total
1	Franziska Preuß (GER)	34	38	54	54	38	218
2	Valj Semerenko (UKR)	40	36	43	60	31	210
3	Darya Domracheva (BLR)	DNF	60	60	43	43	206
4	Gabriela Soukalová (CZE)	43	31	32	40	54	200
5	Kaisa Mäkäräinen (FIN)	60	43	36	26	28	193
6	Karin Oberhofer (ITA)	28	32	24	48	40	172
7	Anaïs Bescond (FRA)	54	16	40	32	24	166
8	Franziska Hildebrand (GER)	36	30	27	38	32	163
9	Daria Virolaynen (RUS)	26	34	34	18	29	141
10	Veronika Vítková (CZE)	31	54	48	4	DNF	137
11	Ekaterina Glazyrina (RUS)	22	27	26	28	30	133
12	Laura Dahlmeier (GER)	32	—	—	36	60	128
13	Dorothea Wierer (ITA)	38	29	28	8	25	128
14	Tiril Eckhoff (NOR)	—	48	18	25	36	127
15	Weronika Nowakowska-Ziemniak (POL)	27	28	38	16	14	123
16	Marie Dorin Habert (FRA)	—	—	30	34	48	112
17	Lisa Theresa Hauser (AUT)	12	22	20	27	18	99
18	Susan Dunklee (USA)	18	8	25	21	22	94
19	Vanessa Hinz (GER)	30	25	21	—	16	92
20	Jana Gerekova (SVK)	—	40	6	29	12	87
21	Nadezhda Skardino (BLR)	48	14	22	—	—	84
22	Teja Gregorin (SLO)	8	18	29	—	26	81
23	Marine Bolliet (FRA)	25	24	23	—	—	72
24	Nicole Gontier (ITA)	24	12	31	—	—	67
25	Ekaterina Yurlova (RUS)	—	—	—	30	34	64
26	Ekaterina Shumilova (RUS)	—	20	—	31	—	51
27	Rosanna Crawford (CAN)	29	21	—	—	DNF	50
28	Fuyuko Suzuki (JPN)	23	—	—	23	—	46
29	Elisa Gasparin (SUI)	—	—	—	12	27	39
30	Fanny Welle-Strand Horn (NOR)	20	4	14	—	—	38
31	Juliya Dzhyma (UKR)	14	—	—	—	23	37
32	Elise Ringen (NOR)	—	23	12	—	—	35
33	Megan Heinicke (CAN)	—	—	16	14	—	30
34	Natalya Burdyga (UKR)	—	26	—	—	—	26
35	Krystyna Guzik (POL)	—	—	—	24	—	24
36	Magdalena Gwizdon (POL)	—	—	—	22	—	22
37	Olga Podchufarova (RUS)	21	—	—	—	—	21
37	Eva Puskarčíková (CZE)	—	—	—	—	21	21
39	Andreja Mali (SLO)	—	—	—	20	—	20
39	Aita Gasparin (SUI)	—	—	—	—	20	20
41	Yana Romanova (RUS)	16	—	—	—	—	16
42	Mari Laukkanen (FIN)	—	6	8	—	—	14
43	Nastassia Dubarezava (BLR)	—	—	—	10	—	10
43	Monika Hojnisz (POL)	—	10	—	—	—	10
43	Jitka Landová (CZE)	—	—	10	—	—	10
43	Sophie Boilley (FRA)	10	—	—	—	—	10
43	Hannah Dreissigacker (USA)	—	—	—	—	10	10
48	Enora Latuillière (FRA)	6	2	2	—	DNF	10
49	Luise Kummer (GER)	—	—	—	—	8	8
50	Olga Abramova (UKR)	—	—	—	6	—	6
51	Justine Braisaz (FRA)	4	—	—	—	—	4
51	Katharina Innerhofer (AUT)	—	—	4	—	—	4
53	Dunja Zdouc (AUT)	—	—	—	2	—	2
