= 2014–15 Biathlon World Cup – Individual Women =

The 2014–15 Biathlon World Cup – Individual Women started on Thursday December 4, 2014 in Östersund and finished on Wednesday March 11, 2015 at the World Championships in Kontiolahti. The defending titlist Gabriela Soukalová of Czech Republic finished on the 6th place. Kaisa Mäkäräinen of Finland won the title.

== Competition format ==
The 15 kilometres (9.3 mi) individual race is the oldest biathlon event; the distance is skied over five laps. The biathlete shoots four times at any shooting lane, in the order of prone, standing, prone, standing, totalling 20 targets. For each missed target a fixed penalty time, usually one minute, is added to the skiing time of the biathlete. Competitors' starts are staggered, normally by 30 seconds.

== 2013–14 Top 3 Standings ==
Medal	Athlete	Points
Gold:	(Czech Republic) Gabriela Soukalová	120
Silver:	(Belarus) Darya Domracheva	92
Bronze:	(Slovakia) Anastasiya Kuzmina	84

== Medal winners ==
Event:	Gold:	Time	Silver:	Time	Bronze:	Time
Östersund details	Darya Domracheva; Belarus	46:43.6 (0+0+1+1)	Kaisa Mäkäräinen; Finland	47:11.5 (0+1+1+0)	Valj Semerenko; Ukraine	47:21.7 (0+0+0+0)
Holmenkollen details	Kaisa Mäkäräinen; Finland	43:54.8 (0+0+0+0)	Darya Domracheva; Belarus	45:13.1 (1+0+0+0)	Veronika Vítková; Czech Republic	45:15.7 (0+0+0+0)
World Championships details	Ekaterina Yurlova; Russia	41:32.2 (0+0+0+0)	Gabriela Soukalová; Czech Republic	41:55.4 (0+0+0+1)	Kaisa Mäkäräinen; Finland	41:56.6 (0+1+1+0)

== Standings ==
#	Name	ÖST	HOL	WCH	Total
1	Kaisa Mäkäräinen (FIN)	54	60	48	162
2	Darya Domracheva (BLR)	60	54	25	139
3	Veronika Vítková (CZE)	40	48	34	122
4	Franziska Hildebrand (GER)	38	34	31	103
5	Nadezhda Skardino (BLR)	43	25	21	89
6	Gabriela Soukalová (CZE)	0	32	54	86
7	Ekaterina Yurlova (RUS)	—	22	60	82
8	Laura Dahlmeier (GER)	—	43	38	81
9	Susan Dunklee (USA)	20	30	29	79
10	Megan Heinicke (CAN)	29	29	20	78
11	Valj Semerenko (UKR)	48	DNF	26	74
12	Weronika Nowakowska-Ziemniak (POL)	27	18	28	73
13	Monika Hojnisz (POL)	0	40	32	72
14	Dorothea Wierer (ITA)	DNS	27	43	70
15	Juliya Dzhyma (UKR)	26	38	3	67
16	Anaïs Bescond (FRA)	—	31	36	67
17	Ekaterina Glazyrina (RUS)	34	24	—	58
18	Daria Virolaynen (RUS)	14	DNS	40	54
19	Jana Gereková (SVK)	18	28	0	46
20	Franziska Preuß (GER)	24	21	—	45
21	Elisa Gasparin (SUI)	6	20	19	45
22	Karin Oberhofer (ITA)	13	6	24	43
23	Krystyna Guzik (POL)	15	0	27	42
24	Tiril Eckhoff (NOR)	36	5	0	41
25	Iryna Varvynets (UKR)	—	36	5	41
26	Luise Kummer (GER)	23	—	16	39
27	Rosanna Crawford (CAN)	25	13	0	38
28	Elisabeth Högberg (SWE)	32	0	0	32
30	Teja Gregorin (SLO)	16	16	—	32
31	Lisa Theresa Hauser (AUT)	3	14	15	32
32	Sophie Boilley (FRA)	31	—	—	31
33	Federica Sanfilippo (ITA)	—	0	30	30
34	Olga Podchufarova (RUS)	30	0	0	30
35	Nicole Gontier (ITA)	12	12	6	30
36	Yana Romanova (RUS)	19	—	10	29
37	Enora Latuillière (FRA)	28	0	0	28
38	Elise Ringen (NOR)	0	19	9	28
39	Mona Brorsson (SWE)	10	0	18	28
40	Marie Dorin Habert (FRA)	—	26	—	26
41	Eva Puskarčíková (CZE)	0	7	17	24
42	Nadzeya Pisareva (BLR)	0	DNS	23	23
43	Kadri Lehta (EST)	0	23	0	23
44	Iryna Kryuko (BLR)	—	0	22	22
45	Marine Bolliet (FRA)	22	0	—	22
46	Jitka Landová (CZE)	21	0	—	21
47	Karolin Horchler (GER)	17	—	—	17
47	Darya Usanova (KAZ)	0	17	0	17
49	Tang Jialin (CHN)	—	15	0	15
50	Fuyuko Suzuki (JPN)	7	0	8	15
51	Yurie Tanaka (JPN)	0	0	14	14
52	Yuliya Zhuravok (UKR)	0	—	13	13
53	Emilia Yordanova (BUL)	0	0	12	12
54	Dunja Zdouc (AUT)	0	—	11	11
55	Nastassia Dubarezava (BLR)	11	0	0	11
55	Audrey Vaillancourt (CAN)	0	11	0	11
57	Barbora Tomešová (CZE)	0	10	—	10
58	Natalya Burdyga (UKR)	1	9	—	10
59	Magdalena Gwizdoń (POL)	9	—	0	9
60	Ekaterina Shumilova (RUS)	8	—	—	8
60	Hannah Dreissigacker (USA)	0	8	0	8
62	Justine Braisaz (FRA)	—	1	7	8
63	Éva Tófalvi (ROU)	5	—	0	5
64	Terézia Poliaková (SVK)	0	0	4	4
65	Olga Abramova (UKR)	4	0	—	4
65	Irina Trusova (RUS)	—	4	—	4
67	Natalija Kočergina (LTU)	DNS	3	0	3
68	Gabriele Lescinskaite (LTU)	—	—	2	2
69	Paulína Fialková (SVK)	0	2	0	2
69	Vanessa Hinz (GER)	2	0	0	2
71	Alina Raikova (KAZ)	—	0	1	1
