= 2014–15 Biathlon World Cup – Pursuit Men =

The 2014–15 Biathlon World Cup – Pursuit Men started on Saturday December 6, 2014 in Östersund and finished on Saturday March 21, 2015 in Khanty-Mansiysk. Martin Fourcade of France successfully defended his title.

== Competition format ==
This is a pursuit competition. The biathletes' starts are separated by their time differences from a previous race, most commonly a sprint race. The contestants ski a distance of 12.5 kilometres (7.8 mi) over five laps. On four of the laps, the contestants shoot at targets; each miss requires the contestant to ski a penalty loop of 150 metres (490 ft). There are two prone shooting bouts and two standing bouts, in that order. The contestant crossing the finish line first is the winner.

To prevent awkward and/or dangerous crowding of the skiing loops, and overcapacity at the shooting range, World Cup Pursuits are held with only the 60 top ranking biathletes after the preceding race. The biathletes shoot (on a first-come, first-served basis) at the lane corresponding to the position they arrived for all shooting bouts.

Points are awarded for each event, according to each contestant's finish. When all events are completed. the contestant with the highest number of points is declared the season winner.

== 2013-14 Top 3 Standings ==
Medal	Athlete	Points
Gold:	(France) Martin Fourcade	294
Silver:	(Austria) Simon Eder	235
Bronze:	(Russia) Anton Shipulin	234

== Medal winners ==
Event:	Gold:	Time	Silver:	Time	Bronze:	Time
Östersund details	Martin Fourcade; France	33:54.9 (2+1+0+1)	Anton Shipulin; Russia	34:04.9 (0+0+1+0)	Emil Hegle Svendsen; Norway	34:21.2 (0+1+0+1)
Hochfilzen details	Martin Fourcade; France	32:53.7 (0+0+0+0)	Simon Schempp; Germany	32:57.8 (0+0+0+0)	Jakov Fak; Slovenia	33:04.6 (0+0+0+1)
Pokljuka details	Emil Hegle Svendsen; Norway	30:43.3 (0+0+0+0)	Anton Shipulin; Russia	31:01.1 (0+1+1+0)	Martin Fourcade; France	31:42.8 (0+0+1+0)
Antholz details	Simon Schempp; Germany	31:27.9 (1+1+0+0)	Simon Eder; Austria	31:28.0 (0+1+0+0)	Evgeniy Garanichev; Russia	31:29.0 (0+0+1+0)
Nové Město details	Jakov Fak; Slovenia	37:24.9 (0+0+0+1)	Simon Schempp; Germany	37:29.3 (0+1+0+0)	Martin Fourcade; France	37:38.2 (0+0+0+0)
World Championships details	Erik Lesser; Germany	30:47.9 (0+0+0+0)	Anton Shipulin; Russia	31:04.9 (0+1+0+0)	Tarjei Bø; Norway	31:06.6 (0+0+1+0)
Khanty-Mansiysk details	Nathan Smith; Canada	32:04.9 (0+0+0+1)	Benedikt Doll; Germany	32:28.9 (0+0+1+1)	Anton Shipulin; Russia	32:40.6 (1+1+0+2)

== Standings ==
#	Name	ÖST	HOC	POK	ANT	NOV	WCH	KHA	Total
1	Martin Fourcade (FRA)	60	60	48	40	48	36	43	335
2	Anton Shipulin (RUS)	54	40	54	28	27	54	48	305
3	Jakov Fak (SLO)	43	48	30	36	60	34	31	282
4	Simon Schempp (GER)	38	54	22	60	54	—	DNS	228
5	Erik Lesser (GER)	18	23	18	38	34	60	16	207
6	Emil Hegle Svendsen (NOR)	48	27	60	24	18	22	DNF	199
7	Tarjei Bø (NOR)	27	38	24	16	0	48	30	183
8	Fredrik Lindström (SWE)	28	19	29	21	31	17	36	181
9	Evgeniy Garanichev (RUS)	30	14	25	48	38	19	5	179
10	Nathan Smith (CAN)	25	0	19	—	40	28	60	172
11	Simon Fourcade (FRA)	7	15	21	34	28	31	30	166
12	Ondřej Moravec (CZE)	21	32	40	30	2	32	0	157
13	Arnd Peiffer (GER)	23	0	—	31	32	27	38	151
14	Dominik Landertinger (AUT)	40	34	43	—	7	26	—	150
15	Johannes Thingnes Bø (NOR)	11	43	34	19	29	10	—	146
16	Daniel Böhm (GER)	8	29	13	29	24	—	40	143
17	Jean-Guillaume Béatrix (FRA)	32	3	36	25	25	0	21	142
18	Simon Eder (AUT)	17	25	0	54	9	29	6	140
19	Ole Einar Bjørndalen (NOR)	31	—	—	43	6	40	14	134
20	Michal Šlesingr (CZE)	22	—	4	0	30	43	32	131
21	Andreas Birnbacher (GER)	36	36	0	22	36	—	—	130
22	Vladimir Iliev (BUL)	4	30	15	9	17	38	8	121
23	Benjamin Weger (SUI)	—	21	32	13	15	8	28	117
24	Serhiy Semenov (UKR)	5	6	—	—	43	30	25	109
25	Benedikt Doll (GER)	—	—	—	18	20	13	54	105
26	Timofey Lapshin (RUS)	10	28	38	27	—	1	0	104
27	Andrejs Rastorgujevs (LAT)	13	24	0	6	—	16	34	93
28	Daniel Mesotitsch (AUT)	16	22	11	12	—	15	17	93
29	Lukas Hofer (ITA)	9	—	31	11	—	11	27	89
30	Quentin Fillon Maillet (FRA)	15	26	3	20	22	0	DNS	86
31	Brendan Green (CAN)	—	0	8	23	11	25	18	85
32	Lowell Bailey (USA)	24	9	12	10	—	5	19	79
33	Krasimir Anev (BUL)	19	18	10	DNS	19	0	9	75
34	Tim Burke (USA)	6	16	20	1	4	21	0	68
35	Alexander Os (NOR)	34	8	14	7	—	—	—	63
36	Dmitry Malyshko (RUS)	0	31	7	0	—	0	20	58
37	Sven Grossegger (AUT)	0	—	17	14	23	—	2	56
38	Julian Eberhard (AUT)	—	2	0	26	0	4	22	54
39	Michal Krčmář (CZE)	0	0	26	17	8	0	0	51
40	Maxim Tsvetkov (RUS)	12	20	6	—	13	—	0	51
41	Leif Nordgren (USA)	0	4	0	—	21	0	24	49
42	Dmytro Pidruchnyi (UKR)	—	10	5	32	DNS	0	—	47
43	Simon Desthieux (FRA)	0	1	16	DNS	26	—	—	43
44	Johannes Kühn (GER)	—	—	28	—	—	—	10	38
45	Klemen Bauer (SLO)	29	5	—	—	0	2	1	37
46	Dominik Windisch (ITA)	0	0	23	5	—	6	0	34
47	Jaroslav Soukup (CZE)	—	—	—	0	10	23	—	33
48	Vladimir Chepelin (BLR)	—	—	—	3	DNS	3	26	32
49	Michael Roesch (BEL)	—	—	—	2	0	18	11	31
50	Erlend Bjøntegaard (NOR)	—	—	27	—	3	—	DNS	30
51	Artem Pryma (UKR)	3	12	—	15	0	—	0	30
52	Vetle Sjåstad Christiansen (NOR)	26	—	2	—	—	—	—	28
53	Christian De Lorenzi (ITA)	—	—	—	8	DNS	20	—	28
54	Mario Dolder (SUI)	—	—	—	0	12	9	7	28
55	Yan Savitskiy (KAZ)	14	13	0	0	—	—	—	27
56	Yuryi Liadov (BLR)	2	0	—	DNS	DNS	24	0	26
57	Matej Kazar (SVK)	0	17	9	0	0	0	0	26
58	Florian Graf (GER)	0	—	—	—	—	—	23	23
59	Tomas Krupcik (CZE)	20	—	0	—	—	—	—	20
60	Alexei Slepov (RUS)	—	—	—	—	5	—	13	18
61	Antonin Guigonnat (FRA)	—	—	—	—	16	—	—	16
62	Ivan Joller (SUI)	—	—	0	—	—	0	15	15
63	Roland Lessing (EST)	—	—	—	—	—	14	—	14
63	Matvei Elissev (RUS)	—	—	—	—	14	—	—	14
65	Henrik L'Abée-Lund (NOR)	—	—	—	DNS	1	12	0	13
66	Alexey Volkov (RUS)	—	—	—	—	—	—	12	12
67	Lars Helge Birkeland (NOR)	—	11	—	—	—	—	0	11
68	Aleksandr Pechenkin (RUS)	0	7	—	DNS	—	—	—	7
69	Cornel Puchianu (ROU)	0	0	0	0	—	7	—	7
70	David Komatz (AUT)	1	—	—	4	—	—	—	5
71	Kauri Koiv (EST)	—	0	DNS	—	—	0	4	4
72	Oleksander Zhyrnyi (UKR)	0	0	—	0	—	0	3	3
73	Martin Otcenas (SVK)	—	0	1	—	—	—	—	1
