= 2014–15 Biathlon World Cup – Relay Men =

The 2014–15 Biathlon World Cup – Relay Men started on Saturday December 13, 2014 in Hochfilzen and finished on Saturday March 14, 2015 at the World Championships in Kontiolahti. The defending titlist Germany finished on the 3nd place. The title was won by Russia.

== Competition format ==
The relay teams consist of four biathletes, who each ski 7.5 kilometres (4.7 mi), each leg skied over three laps, with two shooting rounds; one prone, one standing. For every round of five targets there are eight bullets available, though the last three can only be single-loaded manually one at a time from spare round holders or bullets deposited by the competitor into trays or onto the mat at the firing line. If after eight bullets there are still misses, one 150 m penalty loop must be taken for each missed target remaining. The first-leg participants start all at the same time, and as in cross-country skiing relays, every athlete of a team must touch the team's next-leg participant to perform a valid changeover. On the first shooting stage of the first leg, the participant must shoot in the lane corresponding to their bib number (Bib #10 shoots at lane #10 regardless of position in race.), then for the remainder of the relay, the relay team shoots at the lane in the position they arrived (Arrive at the range in 5th place, you shoot at lane five.).

== 2013–14 Top 3 Standings ==
Medal	Country	Points
Gold:	Germany	194
Silver:	Sweden	194
Bronze:	Austria	191

== Medal winners ==
Event:	Gold:	Time	Silver:	Time	Bronze:	Time
Hochfilzen details	Russia; Maxim Tsvetkov; Timofey Lapshin; Dmitry Malyshko; Anton Shipulin	1:16:14.8 (0+0) (0+0) (0+1) (0+0) (0+0) (0+0) (0+0) (0+0)	France; Simon Fourcade; Jean-Guillaume Béatrix; Simon Desthieux; Martin Fourcade	1:16:35.0 (0+0) (0+0) (0+0) (0+1) (0+0) (0+2) (0+1) (0+0)	Norway; Johannes Thingnes Bø; Emil Hegle Svendsen; Lars Helge Birkeland; Tarjei Bø	1:16:42.7 (0+1) (0+0) (0+1) (0+0) (0+2) (0+3) (0+0) (0+3)
Oberhof details	Russia; Evgeniy Garanichev; Timofey Lapshin; Dmitry Malyshko; Anton Shipulin	1:15:24.1 (0+1) (0+1) (0+2) (0+1) (0+3) (1+3) (0+0) (0+1)	Norway; Vetle Sjåstad Christiansen; Alexander Os; Johannes Thingnes Bø; Ole Einar Bjørndalen	1:15:26.4 (0+0) (0+2) (0+0) (0+1) (0+0) (1+3) (0+1) (0+3)	France; Simon Fourcade; Jean-Guillaume Béatrix; Simon Desthieux; Quentin Fillon Maillet	1:16:56.4 (0+1) (0+2) (0+1) (0+1) (0+2) (1+3) (0+1) (0+1)
Ruhpolding details	Norway; Ole Einar Bjørndalen; Erlend Bjøntegaard; Johannes Thingnes Bø; Emil Hegle Svendsen	1:09:42.3 (0+1) (0+0) (0+0) (0+1) (0+1) (0+3) (0+1) (0+1)	Germany; Erik Lesser; Andreas Birnbacher; Arnd Peiffer; Simon Schempp	1:09:46.9 (0+0) (0+1) (0+1) (0+0) (0+0) (0+1) (0+1) (0+0)	Russia; Evgeniy Garanichev; Timofey Lapshin; Alexey Volkov; Anton Shipulin	1:09:50.7 (0+0) (0+1) (0+2) (0+2) (0+1) (0+0) (0+1) (0+1)
Antholz details	Norway; Ole Einar Bjørndalen; Tarjei Bø; Johannes Thingnes Bø; Emil Hegle Svendsen	1:15:36.7 (0+1) (0+0) (0+1) (0+1) (0+2) (0+0) (0+0) (0+0)	Germany; Erik Lesser; Daniel Böhm; Arnd Peiffer; Simon Schempp	1:15:53.1 (0+0) (0+0) (0+0) (0+3) (0+0) (0+1) (0+1) (0+2)	France; Simon Fourcade; Quentin Fillon Maillet; Simon Desthieux; Jean-Guillaume Béatrix	1:16:18.7 (0+0) (0+0) (0+0) (0+1) (0+1) (0+2) (0+1) (0+0)
Holmenkollen details	Russia; Evgeniy Garanichev; Maxim Tsvetkov; Dmitry Malyshko; Anton Shipulin	1:16:16.6 (0+1) (0+1) (0+0) (0+0) (1+3) (0+0) (0+0) (0+0)	Germany; Erik Lesser; Andreas Birnbacher; Arnd Peiffer; Simon Schempp	1:16:16.8 (0+0) (0+0) (0+0) (0+1) (0+3) (0+0) (0+1) (0+1)	Austria; Daniel Mesotitsch; Simon Eder; Sven Grossegger; Dominik Landertinger	1:17:07.5 (0+0) (0+1) (0+1) (0+0) (0+2) (0+0) (0+0) (0+2)
Kontiolahti details	Germany; Erik Lesser; Daniel Böhm; Arnd Peiffer; Simon Schempp	1:13:49.5 (0+0) (0+0) (0+0) (0+2) (0+0) (0+0) (0+0) (0+1)	Norway; Ole Einar Bjørndalen; Tarjei Bø; Johannes Thingnes Bø; Emil Hegle Svendsen	1:14:04.9 (0+0) (0+0) (0+0) (0+3) (0+0) (0+2) (0+0) (0+1)	France; Simon Fourcade; Jean-Guillaume Béatrix; Quentin Fillon Maillet; Martin Fourcade	1:14:23.1 (0+0) (0+0) (0+1) (0+1) (0+1) (0+0) (0+1) (0+0)

== Standings ==
#	Name	HOC	OBE	RUH	ANT	HOL	WCH	Total
1	Russia	60	60	48	40	60	43	311
2	Norway	48	54	60	60	32	54	308
3	Germany	40	43	54	54	54	60	305
4	France	54	48	43	48	38	48	279
5	Austria	43	28	40	43	48	40	242
6	Ukraine	32	40	30	36	36	32	206
7	Canada	38	34	32	32	40	22	198
8	Czech Republic	36	DNF	38	38	43	38	193
9	Slovenia	31	30	36	29	29	34	189
10	Switzerland	30	38	26	24	31	36	185
11	Italy	34	27	27	31	34	29	182
12	Belarus	23	29	34	26	30	31	173
13	Bulgaria	26	36	25	25	28	25	165
14	Slovakia	24	26	29	30	26	30	165
15	Estonia	25	31	24	27	23	26	156
16	Kazakhstan	28	25	19	19	25	24	140
17	Sweden	29	DSQ	28	28	27	23	135
18	Romania	20	24	21	22	22	19	128
19	United States	27	DNS	31	34	—	27	119
20	Great Britain	17	20	17	20	20	17	111
21	Poland	21	21	23	21	—	21	107
22	Finland	DNS	32	22	23	—	28	105
23	Lithuania	22	19	16	—	24	18	99
24	Japan	18	22	20	18	—	20	98
25	Latvia	19	23	18	—	21	15	96
26	South Korea	—	—	—	—	—	16	16
27	Serbia	—	—	—	—	—	14	14
