= 2014–15 Biathlon World Cup – Mass start Men =

The 2014–15 Biathlon World Cup – Mass start Men started on Sunday December 21, 2014 in Pokljuka and finished on Sunday March 22, 2015 in Khanty-Mansiysk. The defending titlist Martin Fourcade of France finished on the 3rd place. Anton Shipulin of Russia won the title.

== 2013-14 Top 3 Standings ==
Medal	Athlete	Points
Gold:	(France) Martin Fourcade	174
Silver:	(Austria) Dominik Landertinger	109
Bronze:	(Norway) Emil Hegle Svendsen	100

== Medal winners ==
Event:	Gold:	Time	Silver:	Time	Bronze:	Time
Pokljuka details	Anton Shipulin; Russia	35:16.8 (0+0+0+1)	Martin Fourcade; France	35:18.0 (0+0+0+1)	Simon Eder; Austria	35:18.2 (0+0+1+0)
Oberhof details	Martin Fourcade; France	44:52.0 (0+0+0+0)	Anton Shipulin; Russia	45:05.1 (1+1+1+1)	Dmitry Malyshko; Russia	45:22.7 (1+0+0+2)
Ruhpolding details	Simon Schempp; Germany	35:45.8 (0+0+0+0)	Quentin Fillon Maillet; France	35:45.8 (0+0+0+0)	Michal Šlesingr; Czech Republic	35:45.8 (0+0+0+0)
Kontiolahti details	Jakov Fak; Slovenia	36:24.9 (0+0+1+0)	Ondřej Moravec; Czech Republic	36:25.9 (1+0+0+0)	Tarjei Bø; Norway	36:28.6 (0+0+1+0)
Khanty-Mansiysk details	Jakov Fak; Slovenia	38:09.8 (0+0+0+0)	Anton Shipulin; Russia	38:20.1 (1+0+1+0)	Tarjei Bø; Norway	38:22.3 (1+0+0+0)

== Standings ==
#	Name	POK	OBE	RUH	WCH	KHA	Total
1	Anton Shipulin (RUS)	60	54	38	36	54	242
2	Jakov Fak (SLO)	34	36	14	60	60	204
3	Martin Fourcade (FRA)	54	60	20	31	21	186
4	Simon Eder (AUT)	48	30	34	22	40	174
5	Ondřej Moravec (CZE)	36	28	29	54	20	167
6	Michal Šlesingr (CZE)	4	40	48	40	16	148
7	Simon Schempp (GER)	21	31	60	34	—	146
8	Fredrik Lindström (SWE)	43	21	27	29	26	146
9	Johannes Thingnes Bø (NOR)	16	27	31	38	32	144
10	Tarjei Bø (NOR)	38	—	—	48	48	134
11	Quentin Fillon Maillet (FRA)	29	18	54	—	27	128
12	Simon Fourcade (FRA)	—	25	24	32	43	124
13	Evgeniy Garanichev (RUS)	12	16	30	30	29	117
14	Jean-Guillaume Béatrix (FRA)	40	DNF	36	—	38	114
15	Emil Hegle Svendsen (NOR)	24	8	43	26	8	109
16	Ole Einar Bjørndalen (NOR)	—	24	40	43	—	107
17	Erik Lesser (GER)	2	29	16	24	28	99
18	Benedikt Doll (GER)	—	34	21	25	18	98
19	Nathan Smith (CAN)	32	21	—	16	24	93
20	Dmitry Malyshko (RUS)	30	48	12	—	—	90
21	Krasimir Anev (BUL)	23	43	8	—	12	86
22	Arnd Peiffer (GER)	—	—	32	18	36	86
23	Andreas Birnbacher (GER)	31	23	25	—	—	79
24	Daniel Böhm (GER)	25	—	18	—	34	77
25	Timofey Lapshin (RUS)	10	32	28	—	6	76
26	Andrejs Rastorgujevs (LAT)	—	38	4	—	30	72
27	Benjamin Weger (SUI)	14	12	10	4	31	71
28	Lowell Bailey (USA)	18	4	6	28	—	56
29	Vladimir Iliev (BUL)	6	22	2	12	2	44
30	Brendan Green (CAN)	—	—	23	20	—	43
31	Dominik Landertinger (AUT)	28	—	—	14	—	42
32	Maxim Tsvetkov (RUS)	26	14	—	—	—	40
33	Tim Burke (USA)	8	—	—	27	—	35
34	Roland Lessing (EST)	—	26	—	2	—	28
35	Erlend Bjøntegaard (NOR)	27	—	—	—	—	27
36	Yuryi Liadov (BLR)	—	6	—	21	—	27
37	Alexander Os (NOR)	—	—	26	—	—	26
38	Julian Eberhard (AUT)	—	—	—	—	25	25
39	Christian De Lorenzi (ITA)	—	—	—	23	—	23
39	Vladimir Chepelin (BLR)	—	—	—	—	23	23
41	Henrik L'Abée-Lund (NOR)	—	—	22	—	—	22
41	Dominik Windisch (ITA)	22	—	—	—	—	22
41	Johannes Kühn (GER)	—	—	—	—	22	22
44	Lukas Hofer (ITA)	20	—	—	—	—	20
45	Sergey Semenov (UKR)	—	—	—	8	10	18
46	Leif Nordgren (USA)	—	—	—	—	14	14
47	Artem Tyshchenko (UKR)	—	10	—	—	—	10
47	Michael Rösch (BEL)	—	—	—	10	—	10
49	Jaroslav Soukup (CZE)	—	—	—	6	—	6
50	Florian Graf (GER)	—	—	—	—	4	4
