= 2014–15 Biathlon World Cup =

Biathlon competition

Discipline	Men	Women
Overall	(France) Martin Fourcade	(Belarus) Darya Domracheva
Nations Cup	Norway	Germany
Individual	(Ukraine) Serhiy Semenov	(Finland) Kaisa Mäkäräinen
Sprint	(France) Martin Fourcade	(Belarus) Darya Domracheva
Pursuit	(France) Martin Fourcade	(Belarus) Darya Domracheva
Mass start	(Russia) Anton Shipulin	(Germany) Franziska Preuß
Relay	Russia	Czech Republic
- Mixed: Norway

Competition

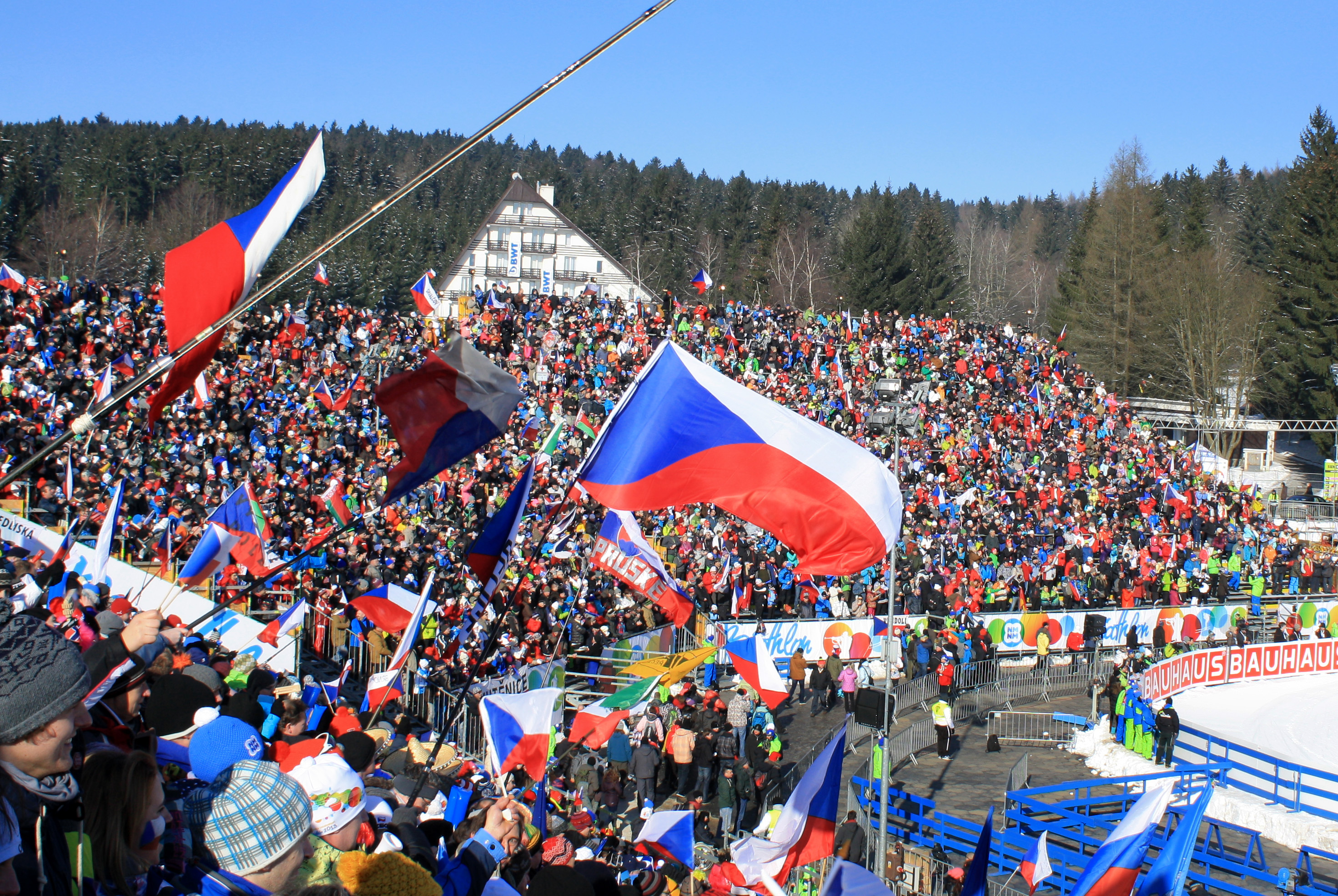
2014–15 World Cup in Nové Město

The 2014–15 Biathlon World Cup is a multi-race tournament over a season of biathlon, organised by the International Biathlon Union. The season started on 30 November 2014 in Östersund, Sweden, and ended on 22 March 2015 in Khanty-Mansiysk, Russia.

A new event, called the "Single mixed relay", made its World Cup debut on 6 February 2015 in Nové Město. This event involves one male and one female biathlete each completing two legs consisting of one prone and one standing shoot.

== Calendar ==
Below is the IBU World Cup calendar for the 2014–15 season.

Stage	Location	Date	Individual	Sprint	Pursuit	Mass start	Relay	Mixed relay	Single mixed relay	Details
1	(Sweden) Östersund	30 November–7 December	●	●	●			●		details
2	(Austria) Hochfilzen	12–14 December		●	●		●			details
3	(Slovenia) Pokljuka	18–21 December		●	●	●				details
4	(Germany) Oberhof	7–11 January		●		●	●			details
5	(Germany) Ruhpolding	14–18 January		●		●	●			details
6	(Italy) Antholz-Anterselva	22–25 January		●	●		●			details
7	(Czech Republic) Nové Město	6–8 February		●	●			●	●	details
8	(Norway) Holmenkollen	12–15 February	●	●			●			details
WC	(Finland) Kontiolahti	5–15 March	●	●	●	●	●	●		World Championships
9	(Russia) Khanty-Mansiysk	19–22 March		●	●	●				details
Total: 66 (31 men's, 31 women's, 4 mixed)			3	10	7	5	6	3	1	

== Men ==
=== World Cup podiums ===
Key: IND – Individual / SIND – Short Individual / SPR – Sprint / PUR – Pursuit / MSS – Mass Start
No.	Date	Place (In brackets Stage)	Discipline	Winner	Second	Third	Yellow bib	Det.
1	3 December 2014	(Sweden) Östersund	20 km Individual	(Norway) Emil Hegle Svendsen	(Ukraine) Serhiy Semenov	(Czech Republic) Michal Šlesingr	(Norway) Emil Hegle Svendsen	Detail
1	6 December 2014	(Sweden) Östersund	10 km Sprint	(France) Martin Fourcade	(Czech Republic) Ondřej Moravec	(Slovenia) Jakov Fak	(Norway) Emil Hegle Svendsen	Detail
1	7 December 2014	(Sweden) Östersund	12.5 km Pursuit	(France) Martin Fourcade	(Russia) Anton Shipulin	(Norway) Emil Hegle Svendsen	(Norway) Emil Hegle Svendsen	Detail
2	12 December 2014	(Austria) Hochfilzen	10 km Sprint	(Norway) Johannes Thingnes Bø	(Germany) Simon Schempp	(Germany) Andreas Birnbacher	(Norway) Emil Hegle Svendsen	Detail
2	14 December 2014	(Austria) Hochfilzen	12.5 km Pursuit	(France) Martin Fourcade	(Germany) Simon Schempp	(Slovenia) Jakov Fak	(France) Martin Fourcade	Detail
3	19 December 2014	(Slovenia) Pokljuka	10 km Sprint	(Russia) Anton Shipulin	(Austria) Dominik Landertinger	(Norway) Emil Hegle Svendsen	(France) Martin Fourcade	Detail
3	20 December 2014	(Slovenia) Pokljuka	12.5 km Pursuit	(Norway) Emil Hegle Svendsen	(Russia) Anton Shipulin	(France) Martin Fourcade	(Norway) Emil Hegle Svendsen	Detail
3	21 December 2014	(Slovenia) Pokljuka	15 km Mass Start	(Russia) Anton Shipulin	(France) Martin Fourcade	(Austria) Simon Eder	(France) Martin Fourcade	Detail
4	10 January 2015	(Germany) Oberhof	10 km Sprint	(France) Martin Fourcade	(Norway) Ole Einar Bjørndalen	(Russia) Timofey Lapshin	(France) Martin Fourcade	Detail
4	11 January 2015	(Germany) Oberhof	15 km Mass Start	(France) Martin Fourcade	(Russia) Anton Shipulin	(Russia) Dmitry Malyshko	(France) Martin Fourcade	Detail
5	17 January 2015	(Germany) Ruhpolding	10 km Sprint	(Norway) Johannes Thingnes Bø	(Germany) Simon Schempp	(Germany) Arnd Peiffer	(France) Martin Fourcade	Detail
5	18 January 2015	(Germany) Ruhpolding	15 km Mass Start	(Germany) Simon Schempp	(France) Quentin Fillon Maillet	(Czech Republic) Michal Šlesingr	(France) Martin Fourcade	Detail
6	22 January 2015	(Italy) Anterselva	10 km Sprint	(Germany) Simon Schempp	(Russia) Evgenii Garanichev	(Slovenia) Jakov Fak	(France) Martin Fourcade	Detail
6	24 January 2015	(Italy) Anterselva	12.5 km Pursuit	(Germany) Simon Schempp	(Austria) Simon Eder	(Russia) Evgenii Garanichev	(France) Martin Fourcade	Detail
7	7 February 2015	(Czech Republic) Nové Město	10 km Sprint	(Slovenia) Jakov Fak	(Germany) Simon Schempp	(France) Jean-Guillaume Béatrix	(France) Martin Fourcade	Detail
7	8 February 2015	(Czech Republic) Nové Město	12.5 km Pursuit	(Slovenia) Jakov Fak	(Germany) Simon Schempp	(France) Martin Fourcade	(France) Martin Fourcade	Detail
8	12 February 2015	(Norway) Oslo	20 km Individual	(France) Martin Fourcade	(Russia) Evgenii Garanichev	(Ukraine) Serhiy Semenov	(France) Martin Fourcade	Detail
8	14 February 2015	(Norway) Oslo	10 km Sprint	(Germany) Arnd Peiffer	(France) Martin Fourcade	(Russia) Anton Shipulin	(France) Martin Fourcade	Detail
WCH	7 March 2015	(Finland) Kontiolahti	10 km Sprint	(Norway) Johannes Thingnes Bø	(Canada) Nathan Smith	(Norway) Tarjei Bø	(France) Martin Fourcade	Detail
WCH	8 March 2015	(Finland) Kontiolahti	12.5 km Pursuit	(Germany) Erik Lesser	(Russia) Anton Shipulin	(Norway) Tarjei Bø	(France) Martin Fourcade	Detail
WCH	12 March 2015	(Finland) Kontiolahti	20 km Individual	(France) Martin Fourcade	(Norway) Emil Hegle Svendsen	(Czech Republic) Ondřej Moravec	(France) Martin Fourcade	Detail
WCH	15 March 2015	(Finland) Kontiolahti	15 km Mass Start	(Slovenia) Jakov Fak	(Czech Republic) Ondřej Moravec	(Norway) Tarjei Bø	(France) Martin Fourcade	Detail
9	19 March 2015	(Russia) Khanty-Mansiysk	10 km Sprint	(France) Martin Fourcade	(Russia) Anton Shipulin	(Germany) Benedikt Doll	(France) Martin Fourcade	Detail
9	21 March 2015	(Russia) Khanty-Mansiysk	12.5 km Pursuit	(Canada) Nathan Smith	(Germany) Benedikt Doll	(Russia) Anton Shipulin	(France) Martin Fourcade	Detail
9	22 March 2015	(Russia) Khanty-Mansiysk	15 km Mass Start	(Slovenia) Jakov Fak	(Russia) Anton Shipulin	(Norway) Tarjei Bø	(France) Martin Fourcade	Detail

==== Men's Relay Podiums ====
WC	Date	Place	Discipline	Winner	Second	Third	Leader	Det.
2	13 December 2014	(Austria) Hochfilzen	4 × 7.5 km Relay	Russia Maxim Tsvetkov; Timofey Lapshin; Dmitry Malyshko; Anton Shipulin	France Simon Fourcade; Jean-Guillaume Béatrix; Simon Desthieux; Martin Fourcade	Norway Johannes Thingnes Bø; Emil Hegle Svendsen; Lars Helge Birkeland; Tarjei Bø	Russia	Detail
4	8 January 2015	(Germany) Oberhof	4 × 7.5 km Relay	Russia Evgenii Garanichev; Timofey Lapshin; Dmitry Malyshko; Anton Shipulin	Norway Vetle Sjåstad Christiansen; Alexander Os; Johannes Thingnes Bø; Ole Einar Bjørndalen	France Simon Fourcade; Jean-Guillaume Béatrix; Simon Desthieux; Quentin Fillon Maillet	Russia	Detail
5	15 January 2015	(Germany) Ruhpolding	4 × 7.5 km Relay	Norway Ole Einar Bjørndalen; Erlend Bjøntegaard; Johannes Thingnes Bø; Emil Hegle Svendsen	Germany Erik Lesser; Andreas Birnbacher; Arnd Peiffer; Simon Schempp	Russia Evgenii Garanichev; Timofey Lapshin; Alexey Volkov; Anton Shipulin	Russia	Detail
6	25 January 2015	(Italy) Anterselva	4 × 7.5 km Relay	Norway Ole Einar Bjørndalen; Tarjei Bø; Johannes Thingnes Bø; Emil Hegle Svendsen	Germany Erik Lesser; Daniel Böhm; Arnd Peiffer; Simon Schempp	France Simon Fourcade; Quentin Fillon Maillet; Simon Desthieux; Jean-Guillaume Béatrix	Norway	Detail
8	15 February 2015	(Norway) Oslo	4 × 7.5 km Relay	Russia Evgenii Garanichev; Maxim Tsvetkov; Dmitry Malyshko; Anton Shipulin	Germany Erik Lesser; Andreas Birnbacher; Arnd Peiffer; Simon Schempp	Austria Daniel Mesotitsch; Simon Eder; Sven Grossegger; Dominik Landertinger	Russia	Detail
WCH	14 March 2015	(Finland) Kontiolahti	4 × 7.5 km Relay	Germany Erik Lesser; Daniel Böhm; Arnd Peiffer; Simon Schempp	Norway Ole Einar Bjørndalen; Tarjei Bø; Johannes Thingnes Bø; Emil Hegle Svendsen	France Simon Fourcade; Jean-Guillaume Béatrix; Quentin Fillon Maillet; Martin Fourcade	Russia	Detail

=== Standings ===
==== Overall ====
Rank	after all 25 races	Points
Yellow bib	(France) Martin Fourcade	1042
2.	(Russia) Anton Shipulin	978
3.	(Slovenia) Jakov Fak	883
4.	(Germany) Simon Schempp	792
5.	(Norway) Johannes Thingnes Bø	729
6.	(Czech Republic) Ondřej Moravec	655
7.	(Russia) Evgenii Garanichev	636
8.	(Czech Republic) Michal Šlesingr	630
9.	(Norway) Emil Hegle Svendsen	613
10.	(Germany) Erik Lesser	607

==== Individual ====
Rank	after all 3 races	Points
Red bib	(Ukraine) Serhiy Semenov	142
2.	(France) Martin Fourcade	120
3.	(Norway) Emil Hegle Svendsen	114
4.	(Czech Republic) Michal Šlesingr	109
5.	(Norway) Johannes Thingnes Bø	108

==== Sprint ====
Rank	after all 10 races	Points
Red bib	(France) Martin Fourcade	416
2.	(Russia) Anton Shipulin	370
3.	(Germany) Simon Schempp	354
4.	(Slovenia) Jakov Fak	337
5.	(Norway) Johannes Thingnes Bø	331

==== Pursuit ====
Rank	after all 7 races	Points
Red bib	(France) Martin Fourcade	335
2.	(Russia) Anton Shipulin	305
3.	(Slovenia) Jakov Fak	282
4.	(Germany) Simon Schempp	228
5.	(Germany) Erik Lesser	207

==== Mass start ====
Rank	after all 5 races	Points
Red bib	(Russia) Anton Shipulin	242
2.	(Slovenia) Jakov Fak	204
3.	(France) Martin Fourcade	186
4.	(Austria) Simon Eder	174
5.	(Czech Republic) Ondřej Moravec	167

==== Relay ====
Rank	after all 6 races	Points
1.	Russia	311
2.	Norway	308
3.	Germany	305
4.	France	279
5.	Austria	242

==== Nation ====
Rank	after all 23 races	Points
1.	Norway	8096.5
2.	Germany	8011.5
3.	France	7826.5
4.	Russia	7533
5.	Austria	6764

== Women ==
=== World Cup podiums ===
WC	Date	Place	Discipline	Winner	Second	Third	Yellow bib	Det.
1	4 December 2014	(Sweden) Östersund	15 km Individual	(Belarus) Darya Domracheva	(Finland) Kaisa Mäkäräinen	(Ukraine) Valentyna Semerenko	(Belarus) Darya Domracheva	Detail
1	6 December 2014	(Sweden) Östersund	7.5 km Sprint	(Norway) Tiril Eckhoff	(Czech Republic) Veronika Vítková	(Finland) Kaisa Mäkäräinen	(Finland) Kaisa Mäkäräinen	Detail
1	7 December 2014	(Sweden) Östersund	10 km Pursuit	(Finland) Kaisa Mäkäräinen	(Ukraine) Valentyna Semerenko	(Italy) Dorothea Wierer	(Finland) Kaisa Mäkäräinen	Detail
2	12 December 2014	(Austria) Hochfilzen	7.5 km Sprint	(Finland) Kaisa Mäkäräinen	(Italy) Karin Oberhofer	(Norway) Tiril Eckhoff	(Finland) Kaisa Mäkäräinen	Detail
2	14 December 2014	(Austria) Hochfilzen	10 km Pursuit	(Finland) Kaisa Mäkäräinen	(France) Anaïs Bescond	(Russia) Olga Podchufarova	(Finland) Kaisa Mäkäräinen	Detail
3	18 December 2014	(Slovenia) Pokljuka	7.5 km Sprint	(Czech Republic) Gabriela Soukalová	(Italy) Dorothea Wierer	(Ukraine) Valentyna Semerenko	(Finland) Kaisa Mäkäräinen	Detail
3	20 December 2014	(Slovenia) Pokljuka	10 km Pursuit	(Belarus) Darya Domracheva	(Finland) Kaisa Mäkäräinen	(Ukraine) Valentyna Semerenko	(Finland) Kaisa Mäkäräinen	Detail
3	21 December 2014	(Slovenia) Pokljuka	12.5 km Mass Start	(Finland) Kaisa Mäkäräinen	(France) Anaïs Bescond	(Belarus) Nadezhda Skardino	(Finland) Kaisa Mäkäräinen	Detail
4	9 January 2015	(Germany) Oberhof	7.5 km Sprint	(Czech Republic) Veronika Vítková	(Italy) Dorothea Wierer	(Italy) Nicole Gontier	(Finland) Kaisa Mäkäräinen	Detail
4	11 January 2015	(Germany) Oberhof	12.5 km Mass Start	(Belarus) Darya Domracheva	(Czech Republic) Veronika Vítková	(Norway) Tiril Eckhoff	(Finland) Kaisa Mäkäräinen	Detail
5	16 January 2015	(Germany) Ruhpolding	7.5 km Sprint	(Norway) Fanny Horn	(Belarus) Darya Domracheva	(Norway) Tiril Eckhoff	(Finland) Kaisa Mäkäräinen	Detail
5	18 January 2015	(Germany) Ruhpolding	12.5 km Mass Start	(Belarus) Darya Domracheva	(Germany) Franziska Preuß	(Czech Republic) Veronika Vítková	(Finland) Kaisa Mäkäräinen	Detail
6	23 January 2015	(Italy) Anterselva	7.5 km Sprint	(Belarus) Darya Domracheva	(Finland) Kaisa Mäkäräinen	(Germany) Laura Dahlmeier	(Finland) Kaisa Mäkäräinen	Detail
6	24 January 2015	(Italy) Anterselva	10 km Pursuit	(Belarus) Darya Domracheva	(Russia) Daria Virolaynen	(Finland) Kaisa Mäkäräinen	(Finland) Kaisa Mäkäräinen	Detail
7	7 February 2015	(Czech Republic) Nové Město	7.5 km Sprint	(Germany) Laura Dahlmeier	(Germany) Franziska Hildebrand	(Czech Republic) Veronika Vítková	(Finland) Kaisa Mäkäräinen	Detail
7	8 February 2015	(Czech Republic) Nové Město	10 km Pursuit	(Belarus) Darya Domracheva	(Finland) Kaisa Mäkäräinen	(Germany) Laura Dahlmeier	(Finland) Kaisa Mäkäräinen	Detail
8	12 February 2015	(Norway) Oslo	15 km Individual	(Finland) Kaisa Mäkäräinen	(Belarus) Darya Domracheva	(Czech Republic) Veronika Vítková	(Finland) Kaisa Mäkäräinen	Detail
8	14 February 2015	(Norway) Oslo	7.5 km Sprint	(Belarus) Darya Domracheva	(Germany) Laura Dahlmeier	(France) Marie Dorin Habert	(Belarus) Darya Domracheva	Detail
WCH	7 March 2015	(Finland) Kontiolahti	7.5 km Sprint	(France) Marie Dorin Habert	(Poland) Weronika Nowakowska-Ziemniak	(Ukraine) Valentyna Semerenko	(Belarus) Darya Domracheva	Detail
WCH	8 March 2015	(Finland) Kontiolahti	10 km Pursuit	(France) Marie Dorin Habert	(Germany) Laura Dahlmeier	(Poland) Weronika Nowakowska-Ziemniak	(Belarus) Darya Domracheva	Detail
WCH	11 March 2015	(Finland) Kontiolahti	15 km Individual	(Russia) Ekaterina Yurlova	(Czech Republic) Gabriela Soukalová	(Finland) Kaisa Mäkäräinen	(Belarus) Darya Domracheva	Detail
WCH	15 March 2015	(Finland) Kontiolahti	12.5 km Mass Start	(Ukraine) Valentyna Semerenko	(Germany) Franziska Preuß	(Italy) Karin Oberhofer	(Belarus) Darya Domracheva	Detail
9	20 March 2015	(Russia) Khanty-Mansiysk	7.5 km Sprint	(Finland) Kaisa Mäkäräinen	(Germany) Laura Dahlmeier	(Belarus) Darya Domracheva	(Belarus) Darya Domracheva	Detail
9	21 March 2015	(Russia) Khanty-Mansiysk	10 km Pursuit	(Belarus) Darya Domracheva	(Germany) Laura Dahlmeier	(Germany) Franziska Preuß	(Belarus) Darya Domracheva	Detail
9	22 March 2015	(Russia) Khanty-Mansiysk	12.5 km Mass Start	(Germany) Laura Dahlmeier	(Czech Republic) Gabriela Soukalová	(France) Marie Dorin Habert	(Belarus) Darya Domracheva	Detail

==== Women's Relay Podiums ====
WC	Date	Place	Discipline	Winner	Second	Third	Leader	Det.
2	13 December 2014	(Austria) Hochfilzen	4 × 6 km Relay	Germany Luise Kummer; Franziska Hildebrand; Vanessa Hinz; Franziska Preuß	Belarus Nadezhda Skardino; Nastassia Dubarezava; Nadzeya Pisareva; Darya Domracheva	Czech Republic Eva Puskarčíková; Gabriela Soukalová; Jitka Landová; Veronika Vítková	Germany	Detail
4	7 January 2015	(Germany) Oberhof	4 × 6 km Relay	Czech Republic Eva Puskarčíková; Gabriela Soukalová; Jitka Landová; Veronika Vítková	France Marine Bolliet; Marie Dorin Habert; Justine Braisaz; Anaïs Bescond	Belarus Nadezhda Skardino; Nastassia Dubarezava; Nadzeya Pisareva; Darya Domracheva	Czech Republic	Detail
5	14 January 2015	(Germany) Ruhpolding	4 × 6 km Relay	Czech Republic Eva Puskarčíková; Gabriela Soukalová; Jitka Landová; Veronika Vítková	Belarus Nadezhda Skardino; Iryna Kryuko; Nadzeya Pisareva; Darya Domracheva	Germany Franziska Preuß; Franziska Hildebrand; Vanessa Hinz; Laura Dahlmeier	Czech Republic	Detail
6	25 January 2015	(Italy) Anterselva	4 × 6 km Relay	Germany Franziska Hildebrand; Franziska Preuß; Luise Kummer; Laura Dahlmeier	Czech Republic Eva Puskarčíková; Gabriela Soukalová; Jitka Landová; Veronika Vítková	Ukraine Yuliia Dzhima; Natalya Burdyga; Olga Abramova; Valentyna Semerenko	Czech Republic	Detail
8	15 February 2015	(Norway) Oslo	4 × 6 km Relay	Czech Republic Eva Puskarčíková; Gabriela Soukalová; Jitka Landová; Veronika Vítková	Italy Dorothea Wierer; Nicole Gontier; Federica Sanfilippo; Karin Oberhofer	France Anaïs Bescond; Enora Latuillière; Coline Varcin; Marie Dorin Habert	Czech Republic	Detail
WCH	13 March 2015	(Finland) Kontiolahti	4 × 6 km Relay	Germany Franziska Hildebrand; Franziska Preuß; Vanessa Hinz; Laura Dahlmeier	France Anaïs Bescond; Enora Latuillière; Justine Braisaz; Marie Dorin Habert	Italy Lisa Vittozzi; Karin Oberhofer; Nicole Gontier; Dorothea Wierer	Czech Republic	Detail

=== Standings ===
==== Overall ====
Rank	after all 25 races	Points
Yellow bib	(Belarus) Darya Domracheva	1094
2.	(Finland) Kaisa Mäkäräinen	1047
3.	(Ukraine) Valentyna Semerenko	869
4.	(Czech Republic) Veronika Vítková	798
5.	(Germany) Franziska Hildebrand	761
6.	(Czech Republic) Gabriela Soukalová	758
7.	(Italy) Dorothea Wierer	751
8.	(Germany) Laura Dahlmeier	725
9.	(Germany) Franziska Preuß	658
10.	(Italy) Karin Oberhofer	651

==== Individual ====
Rank	after all 3 races	Points
Red bib	(Finland) Kaisa Mäkäräinen	162
2.	(Belarus) Darya Domracheva	139
3.	(Czech Republic) Veronika Vítková	122
4.	(Germany) Franziska Hildebrand	103
5.	(Belarus) Nadezhda Skardino	89

==== Sprint ====
Rank	after all 10 races	Points
Red bib	(Belarus) Darya Domracheva	417
2.	(Finland) Kaisa Mäkäräinen	366
3.	(Czech Republic) Veronika Vítková	349
4.	(Italy) Dorothea Wierer	335
5.	(Ukraine) Valentyna Semerenko	330

==== Pursuit ====
Rank	after all 7 races	Points
Red bib	(Belarus) Darya Domracheva	348
2.	(Finland) Kaisa Mäkäräinen	348
3.	(Ukraine) Valentyna Semerenko	258
4.	(Germany) Laura Dahlmeier	224
5.	(Italy) Dorothea Wierer	215

==== Mass start ====
Rank	after all 5 races	Points
Red bib	(Germany) Franziska Preuß	218
2.	(Ukraine) Valentyna Semerenko	210
3.	(Belarus) Darya Domracheva	206
4.	(Czech Republic) Gabriela Soukalová	200
5.	(Finland) Kaisa Mäkäräinen	195

==== Relay ====
Rank	after all 6 races	Points
1.	Czech Republic	318
2.	Germany	303
3.	France	271
4.	Belarus	266
5.	Italy	255

==== Nation ====
Rank	after all 23 races	Points
1.	Germany	7880.5
2.	Czech Republic	7681.5
3.	France	7465.5
4.	Belarus	7323.5
5.	Ukraine	7111

== Mixed Relay ==
Event	Date	Place	Discipline	Winner	Second	Third	Det.
1	30 November 2014	(Sweden) Östersund	Mixed Relay	France Anaïs Bescond; Anaïs Chevalier; Simon Fourcade; Martin Fourcade	Norway Synnøve Solemdal; Tiril Eckhoff; Vetle Sjåstad Christiansen; Lars Helge Birkeland	Germany Franziska Hildebrand; Franziska Preuß; Arnd Peiffer; Simon Schempp	Detail
7	6 February 2015	(Czech Republic) Nové Město	Single Mixed Relay	Russia Yana Romanova; Alexey Volkov	Norway Marte Olsbu; Henrik L'Abée-Lund	Ukraine Juliya Dzhyma; Artem Tyshchenko	Detail
7	6 February 2015	(Czech Republic) Nové Město	Mixed Relay	Norway Fanny Welle-Strand Horn; Tiril Eckhoff; Johannes Thingnes Bø; Tarjei Bø	Czech Republic Veronika Vítková; Gabriela Soukalová; Michal Šlesingr; Ondřej Moravec	Ukraine Iryna Varvynets; Valj Semerenko; Dmytro Pidruchnyi; Serhiy Semenov	Detail
WC	5 March 2015	(Finland) Kontiolahti	Mixed relay	Czech Republic Veronika Vítková; Gabriela Soukalová; Michal Šlesingr; Ondřej Moravec	France Anaïs Bescond; Marie Dorin Habert; Jean-Guillaume Béatrix; Martin Fourcade	Norway Fanny Welle-Strand Horn; Tiril Eckhoff; Johannes Thingnes Bø; Tarjei Bø	Detail

=== Mixed relay ===
Pos.		Points
1.	Norway	216
2.	France	197
3.	Czech Republic	174
4.	Ukraine	169
5.	Germany	169

- Final standings after 4 races.

== Medal table ==
Rank	Nation	Gold	Silver	Bronze	Total
1	Germany	11	16	8	35
2	France	11	8	10	29
3	Norway	10	6	11	27
4	Belarus	9	4	3	16
5	Russia	7	10	6	23
6	Czech Republic	6	8	7	21
7	Finland	6	4	3	13
8	Slovenia	4	0	3	7
9	Ukraine	1	2	8	11
10	Canada	1	1	0	2
11	Italy	0	4	4	8
12	Austria	0	2	2	4
13	Poland	0	1	1	2
Totals (13 entries)		66	66	66	198

== Achievements ==
First World Cup career victory

Men

- Erik Lesser (GER), 26, in his 6th season — the World Championships Pursuit in Kontiolahti; first podium was 2012–13 Individual in Östersund
- Nathan Smith (CAN), 29, in his 7th season — the WC 9 Pursuit in Khanty-Mansiysk; first podium was 2015 World Championships Sprint in Kontiolahti

Women

- Tiril Eckhoff (NOR), 24, in her 4th season — the WC 1 Sprint in Östersund; first podium was 2013–14 Pursuit in Annecy-Le Grand Bornand
- Veronika Vítková (CZE), 26, in her 9th season — the WC 4 Sprint in Oberhof; first podium was 2012–13 Pursuit in Oberhof
- Fanny Welle-Strand Horn (NOR), 26, in her 6th season — the WC 5 Sprint in Ruhpolding; it also was her first podium
- Laura Dahlmeier (GER), 21, in her 3rd season — the WC 7 Sprint in Nové Město; first podium was 2014–15 Sprint in Antholz-Anterselva
- Marie Dorin Habert (FRA), 28, in her 8th season — the World Championships Sprint in Kontiolahti; first podium was 2008–09 Pursuit in Khanty-Mansiysk
- Ekaterina Yurlova (RUS), 30, in her 7th season — the World Championships Individual in Kontiolahti; it also was her first podium

Team

- Russia – Single Mixed Relay in Nové Město (Note: First victory in Mixed Relay events)

First World Cup podium

Men

- Quentin Fillon Maillet (FRA), 22, in his 2nd season — no. 2 in the WC 5 Mass Start in Ruhpolding
- Nathan Smith (CAN), 29, in his 7th season — no.2 in the World Championships Sprint in Kontiolahti
- Benedikt Doll (GER), 24, in his 4th season — no. 3 in the WC 9 Sprint in Khanty-Mansiysk

Women

- Karin Oberhofer (ITA), 29, in her 6th season — no. 2 in the WC 2 Sprint in Hochfilzen
- Olga Podchufarova (RUS), 22, in her 3rd season — no. 3 in the WC 2 Pursuit in Hochfilzen
- Nicole Gontier (ITA), 23, in her 4th season — no. 3 in the WC 4 Sprint in Oberhof
- Franziska Preuß (GER), 20, in her 2nd season — no. 2 in the WC 5 Mass Start in Ruhpolding
- Laura Dahlmeier (GER), 21, in her 3rd season — no. 3 in the WC 6 Sprint in Antholz-Anterselva
- Franziska Hildebrand (GER), 27, in her 4th season — no. 2 in the WC 7 Sprint in Nové Město
- Weronika Nowakowska-Ziemniak (POL), 28, in her 8th season — no.2 in the World Championships Sprint in Kontiolahti

Team

- Norway – no. 2 in Single Mixed Relay in Nové Město
- Ukraine – no. 3 in Single Mixed Relay in Nové Město

Number of wins this season (in brackets are all-time wins)

Men

- Martin Fourcade (FRA), 8 (37) first places
- Jakov Fak (SLO), 4 (8) first places
- Johannes Thingnes Bø (NOR), 3 (8) first places
- Simon Schempp (GER), 3 (5) first places
- Emil Hegle Svendsen (NOR), 2 (37) first places
- Anton Shipulin (RUS), 2 (7) first places
- Arnd Peiffer (GER), 1 (7) first place
- Erik Lesser (GER), 1 (1) first place
- Nathan Smith (CAN), 1 (1) first place

Women

- Darya Domracheva (BLR), 9 (25) first places
- Kaisa Mäkäräinen (FIN), 6 (15) first places
- Marie Dorin Habert (FRA), 2 (2) first places
- Laura Dahlmeier (GER), 2 (2) first places
- Gabriela Soukalová (CZE), 1 (8) first place
- Valj Semerenko (UKR), 1 (2) first place
- Tiril Eckhoff (NOR), 1 (1) first place
- Veronika Vítková (CZE), 1 (1) first place
- Fanny Welle-Strand Horn (NOR), 1 (1) first place
- Ekaterina Yurlova (RUS), 1 (1) first place

== Retirements ==
Following notable biathletes announced their retirement during or after the 2014–15 season:

Men

- Alexei Almoukov (AUS)
- Alexis Bœuf (FRA)
- Lee-Steve Jackson (GBR)
- Christoph Stephan (GER)
- Lars Berger (NOR)
- Martin Eng (NOR)
- Janez Marič (SLO)
- Serguei Sednev (UKR)

Women

- Rayna Koyuva (BGR)
- Chaoqing Song (CHN)
- Yue Wang (CHN)
- Eevamari Rauhamaki (FIN)
- Sophie Boilley (FRA)
- Nerys Jones (GBR)
- Evi Sachenbacher-Stehle (GER)
- Roberta Fiandino (ITA)
- Miki Kobayashi (JPN)
- Katsura Sato (JPN)
- Jo In-hee (KOR)
- Kim Kyung-nam (KOR)
- Ane Skrove Nossum (NOR)
- Anastasia Kalina (RUS)
- Olga Zaitseva (RUS)
- Yana Romanova (RUS)
- Evgenia Seledtsova (RUS)
