= 2014–15 Biathlon World Cup – Individual Men =

The 2014–15 Biathlon World Cup – Individual Men started on Wednesday December 3, 2014 in Östersund and finished on Thursday March 12, 2015 at the World Championships in Kontiolahti. The defending titlist Emil Hegle Svendsen of Norway finished on the 3rd place. Serhiy Semenov of Ukraine won the title.

== Competition format ==
The 20 kilometres (12 mi) individual race is the oldest biathlon event; the distance is skied over five laps. The biathlete shoots four times at any shooting lane, in the order of prone, standing, prone, standing, totalling 20 targets. For each missed target a fixed penalty time, usually one minute, is added to the skiing time of the biathlete. Competitors' starts are staggered, normally by 30 seconds.

== 2013–14 Top 3 Standings ==
Medal	Athlete	Points
Gold:	(Norway) Emil Hegle Svendsen	83
Silver:	(Austria) Simon Eder	79
Bronze:	(Russia) Evgeny Ustyugov	76

== Medal winners ==
Event:	Gold:	Time	Silver:	Time	Bronze:	Time
Östersund details	Emil Hegle Svendsen; Norway	53:25.6 (0+0+0+0)	Serhiy Semenov; Ukraine	54:43.2 (0+1+0+0)	Michal Šlesingr; Czech Republic	55:33.9 (0+0+1+0)
Holmenkollen details	Martin Fourcade; France	51:26.8 (0+0+0+0)	Evgeniy Garanichev; Russia	51:41.0 (0+0+0+0)	Serhiy Semenov; Ukraine	52:15.6 (0+0+0+0)
World Championships details	Martin Fourcade; France	47:29.4 (0+1+0+0)	Emil Hegle Svendsen; Norway	47:50.3 (0+0+0+0)	Ondřej Moravec; Czech Republic	48:09.9 (0+1+0+0)

== Standings ==
#	Name	ÖST	HOL	WCH	Total
1	Serhiy Semenov (UKR)	54	48	40	142
2	Martin Fourcade (FRA)	0	60	60	120
3	Emil Hegle Svendsen (NOR)	60	DNS	54	114
4	Michal Šlesingr (CZE)	48	34	27	109
5	Johannes Thingnes Bø (NOR)	34	38	36	108
6	Simon Fourcade (FRA)	32	25	43	100
7	Erik Lesser (GER)	43	32	23	98
8	Jakov Fak (SLO)	17	43	31	91
9	Evgeniy Garanichev (RUS)	26	54	6	86
10	Ondřej Moravec (CZE)	29	0	48	77
11	Ole Einar Bjørndalen (NOR)	38	—	38	76
12	Benjamin Weger (SUI)	24	40	11	75
13	Daniel Böhm (GER)	18	26	30	74
14	Simon Schempp (GER)	16	14	34	64
15	Fredrik Lindström (SWE)	40	18	3	61
16	Anton Shipulin (RUS)	0	36	25	61
17	Arnd Peiffer (GER)	25	16	19	60
18	Quentin Fillon Maillet (FRA)	31	27	0	58
19	Maxim Tsvetkov (RUS)	23	31	—	54
20	Dominik Landertinger (AUT)	36	0	13	49
20	Krasimir Anev (BUL)	27	0	22	49
20	Vladimir Iliev (BUL)	11	24	14	49
23	Yuryi Liadov (BLR)	0	23	24	47
24	Aleksei Volkov (RUS)	—	9	32	41
25	Tim Burke (USA)	30	0	10	40
26	Lowell Bailey (USA)	21	0	17	38
27	Klemen Bauer (SLO)	19	0	18	37
28	Andreas Birnbacher (GER)	6	30	—	36
29	Michael Rösch (BEL)	0	7	28	35
30	Dominik Windisch (ITA)	28	5	0	33
30	Roland Lessing (EST)	7	0	26	33
32	Simon Eder (AUT)	—	10	21	31
33	Nathan Smith (CAN)	0	29	0	29
33	Christian De Lorenzi (ITA)	0	0	29	29
33	Leif Nordgren (USA)	0	21	8	29
36	Timofey Lapshin (RUS)	0	28	0	28
36	Tarjei Bø (NOR)	12	—	16	28
38	Vladimir Chepelin (BLR)	0	22	0	22
38	Thomas Bormolini (ITA)	22	0	0	22
40	Brendan Green (CAN)	0	0	20	20
40	Tobias Arwidson (SWE)	20	0	0	20
40	Peppe Femling (SWE)	—	20	0	20
40	Jean-Guillaume Béatrix (FRA)	14	6	0	20
44	Andrejs Rastorgujevs (LAT)	DNS	19	0	19
45	Antonin Guigonnat (FRA)	—	17	—	17
46	Tomáš Krupčík (CZE)	0	0	15	15
46	Michal Krčmář (CZE)	—	15	—	15
46	Jeremy Finello (SUI)	15	0	—	15
49	Cornel Puchianu (ROU)	13	—	0	13
49	Benedikt Doll (GER)	—	13	—	13
49	Jaroslav Soukup (CZE)	8	0	5	13
52	Sven Grossegger (AUT)	0	0	12	12
52	Lars Helge Birkeland (NOR)	0	12	—	12
54	Henrik L'Abée-Lund (NOR)	—	11	—	11
54	Artem Pryma (UKR)	—	4	7	11
56	Tobias Eberhard (AUT)	10	—	—	10
57	Tsusaka Kobonoki (JPN)	9	0	0	9
57	Janez Maric (SLO)	—	—	9	9
59	Oleksander Zhyrnyi (UKR)	—	8	—	8
60	David Komatz (AUT)	5	—	—	5
61	Ted Armgren (SWE)	0	0	4	4
61	Artem Tyshchenko (UKR)	4	0	0	4
63	Ahti Toivanen (FIN)	3	DNS	0	3
63	Dmitry Malyshko (RUS)	0	3	—	3
65	Simon Desthieux (FRA)	2	0	0	2
65	Lee-Steve Jackson (GBR)	0	—	2	2
65	Erlend Bjøntegaard (NOR)	—	2	—	2
65	Kalev Ermits (EST)	0	1	1	2
69	Tomáš Hasilla (SVK)	1	0	—	1
