= 2014–15 Biathlon World Cup – Mixed Relay =

The 2014–15 Biathlon World Cup – Mixed Relay started at Sunday November 30, 2014 in Östersund and finished in 2015 in Kontiolahti.

== Competition format ==
The relay teams consist of four biathletes. Legs 1 and 2 are done by the women, legs 3 and 4 by the men. The women's legs are 6 km and men's legs are 7.5 km. Every athlete's leg is skied over three laps, with two shooting rounds; one prone, one standing. For every round of five targets there are eight bullets available, though the last three can only be single-loaded manually one at a time from spare round holders or bullets deposited by the competitor into trays or onto the mat at the firing line. If after eight bullets there are still misses, one 150 m penalty loop must be taken for each missed target remaining. The first-leg participants all start at the same time, and as in cross-country skiing relays, every athlete of a team must touch the team's next-leg participant to perform a valid changeover. On the first shooting stage of the first leg, the participant must shoot in the lane corresponding to their bib number (bib #10 shoots at lane #10 regardless of their position in the race), then for the remainder of the relay, the athletes shoot at the lane in the position they arrived (arrive at the range in 5th place, shoot at lane five).

The single mixed relay involves one male and one female biathlete each completing two legs consisting of one prone and one standing shoot.

== Medal winners ==
Event:	Gold:	Time	Silver:	Time	Bronze:	Time
Mixed Relay - Östersund details	France; Anaïs Bescond; Anaïs Chevalier; Simon Fourcade; Martin Fourcade	1:15:05.5 (0+0) (0+3) (0+3) (0+2) (0+1) (0+0) (0+0) (0+2)	Norway; Synnøve Solemdal; Tiril Eckhoff; Vetle Sjåstad Christiansen; Lars Helge Birkeland	1:15:05.7 (0+3) (1+3) (0+1) (0+1) (0+0) (0+3) (0+0) (0+0)	Germany; Franziska Hildebrand; Franziska Preuß; Arnd Peiffer; Simon Schempp	1:15:05.7 (0+2) (0+0) (0+1) (0+3) (0+2) (0+1) (0+0) (0+0)
Single Mixed Relay - Nove Mesto details	Russia; Yana Romanova; Alexey Volkov; Yana Romanova; Alexey Volkov	0:35:43.3 (0+0) (0+0) (0+2) (0+1) (0+0) (0+0) (0+2) (0+0)	Norway; Marte Olsbu; Henrik L'Abée-Lund; Marte Olsbu; Henrik L'Abée-Lund	0:36:04.8 (0+2) (0+0) (0+0) (0+0) (0+0) (0+0) (0+1) (0+0)	Ukraine; Juliya Dzhyma; Artem Tyshchenko; Juliya Dzhyma; Artem Tyshchenko	0:36:07.9 (0+0) (0+1) (0+0) (0+2) (0+1) (0+0) (0+2) (0+2)
Mixed Relay - Nove Mesto details	Norway; Fanny Welle-Strand Horn; Tiril Eckhoff; Johannes Thingnes Bø; Tarjei Bø	1:12:49.2 (0+1) (0+2) (0+2) (0+0) (0+0) (0+0) (0+1) (0+0)	Czech Republic; Veronika Vítková; Gabriela Soukalova; Michal Šlesingr; Ondřej Moravec	1:12:53.3 (0+1) (0+0) (0+0) (0+2) (0+0) (0+1) (0+0) (0+1)	Ukraine; Iryna Varvynets; Valj Semerenko; Dmytro Pidruchnyi; Serhiy Semenov	1:14:10.5 (0+0) (0+1) (0+2) (0+0) (0+0) (0+0) (1+3) (0+1)
World Championships details	Czech Republic; Veronika Vítková; Gabriela Soukalova; Michal Šlesingr; Ondřej Moravec	1:20:27.2 (0+2) (0+2) (0+0) (0+0) (0+0) (0+2) (0+1) (0+1)	France; Anaïs Bescond; Marie Dorin Habert; Jean-Guillaume Béatrix; Martin Fourcade	1:20:47.4 (0+1) (0+3) (0+0) (0+1) (0+0) (0+3) (0+0) (0+0)	Norway; Fanny Welle-Strand Horn; Tiril Eckhoff; Johannes Thingnes Bø; Tarjei Bø	1:20:54.9 (0+0) (0+0) (0+0) (1+3) (0+0) (0+0) (0+0) (0+0)

== Standings ==
#	Name	ÖST	NOV SI	NOV	WCH KON	Total
1.	Norway	54	54	60	48	216
2	France	60	40	40	54	194
3	Czech Republic	32	28	54	60	174
4	Ukraine	43	48	48	30	169
5	Germany	48	43	38	38	167
6	Russia	29	60	43	31	163
7	Belarus	30	36	30	43	139
8	United States	36	32	36	34	138
9	Austria	34	25	32	40	131
10	Slovenia	38	22	34	26	120
11	Sweden	31	38	26	25	120
12	Switzerland	28	26	29	28	111
13	Slovakia	25	30	31	24	110
14	Finland	22	29	21	32	105
15	Italy	40	—	28	36	104
16	Bulgaria	23	34	23	23	103
17	Poland	27	24	25	27	103
18	Romania	21	27	24	21	93
19	Canada	24	—	27	29	80
20	Lithuania	19	23	19	18	79
21	United Kingdom	18	21	20	16	75
22	Japan	—	31	22	20	73
23	Kazakhstan	26	—	—	17	43
24	Estonia	20	—	—	22	42
25	China	—	—	—	19	19
26	South Korea	—	—	—	15	15
