= 2014–15 Biathlon World Cup – World Cup 1 =

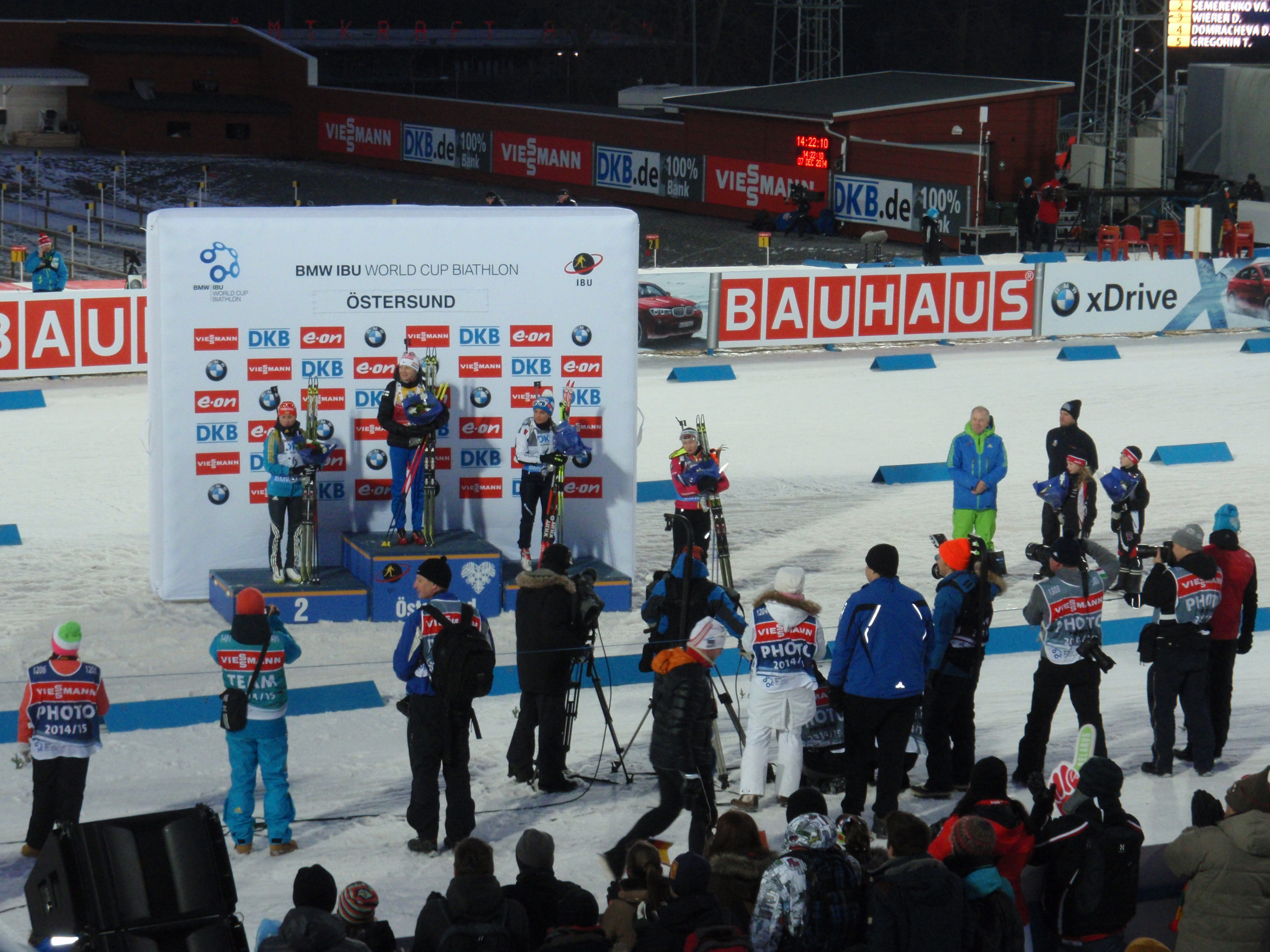
Award ceremony for women's pursuit in Östersund. Winner: Kaisa Mäkäräinen

The 2014–15 Biathlon World Cup – World Cup 1 was the opening event of the season and was held in Östersund, Sweden, from 30 November until 7 December 2014.

== Schedule of events ==
Date	Time	Events
November 30	15:30 CET	Mixed Relay
December 3	17:15 CET	Men's 20 km Individual
December 4	17:15 CET	Women's 15 km Individual
December 6	11:30 CET	Men's 10 km Sprint
December 6	14:45 CET	Women's 7.5 km Sprint
December 7	11:00 CET	Men's 12.5 km Pursuit
December 7	13:30 CET	Women's 10 km Pursuit

== Medal winners ==
=== Men ===
Event:	Gold:	Time	Silver:	Time	Bronze:	Time
20 km Individual details	Emil Hegle Svendsen; Norway	53:25.6 (0+0+0+0)	Serhiy Semenov; Ukraine	54:43.2 (0+1+0+0)	Michal Šlesingr; Czech Republic	55:33.9 (0+0+1+0)
10 km Sprint details	Martin Fourcade; France	24:46.6 (0+0)	Ondřej Moravec; Czech Republic	25:14.9 (0+0)	Jakov Fak; Slovenia	25:15.3 (0+0)
12.5 km Pursuit details	Martin Fourcade; France	33:54.9 (2+1+0+1)	Anton Shipulin; Russia	34:04.9 (0+0+1+0)	Emil Hegle Svendsen; Norway	34:21.2 (0+1+0+1)

=== Women ===
Event:	Gold:	Time	Silver:	Time	Bronze:	Time
15 km Individual details	Darya Domracheva; Belarus	46:43.6 (0+0+1+1)	Kaisa Mäkäräinen; Finland	47:11.5 (0+1+1+0)	Valj Semerenko; Ukraine	47:21.7 (0+0+0+0)
7.5 km Sprint details	Tiril Eckhoff; Norway	21:35.5 (0+1)	Veronika Vítková; Czech Republic	21:40.1 (0+0)	Kaisa Mäkäräinen; Finland	21:43.1 (1+1)
10 km Pursuit details	Kaisa Mäkäräinen; Finland	35:01.7 (1+1+0+1)	Valj Semerenko; Ukraine	35:49.6 (1+0+2+1)	Dorothea Wierer; Italy	35:50.0 (1+1+0+2)

=== Mixed ===
Event:	Gold:	Time	Silver:	Time	Bronze:	Time
2 x 6 km + 2 x 7.5 km Relay details	France; Anaïs Bescond; Anaïs Chevalier; Simon Fourcade; Martin Fourcade	1:15:05.5 (0+0) (0+3) (0+3) (0+2) (0+1) (0+0) (0+0) (0+2)	Norway; Synnøve Solemdal; Tiril Eckhoff; Vetle Sjåstad Christiansen; Lars Helge Birkeland	1:15:05.7 (0+3) (1+3) (0+1) (0+1) (0+0) (0+3) (0+0) (0+0)	Germany; Franziska Hildebrand; Franziska Preuß; Arnd Peiffer; Simon Schempp	1:15:05.7 (0+2) (0+0) (0+1) (0+3) (0+2) (0+1) (0+0) (0+0)

== Achievements ==
Best performance for all time

- Serhiy Semenov (UKR), 2nd place in Individual
- Quentin Fillon Maillet (FRA), 10th place in Individual
- Cornel Puchianu (ROU), 28th place in Individual
- Artem Tyshchenko (UKR), 37th place in Individual
- Gabriel Stegmayr (SWE), 55th place in Individual
- Rolands Puzulis (LAT), 65th place in Individual
- Ivan Zlatev (BUL), 66th place in Individual
- Aleksandrs Patrijuks (LAT), 97th place in Individual and 93rd in Sprint
- Aleksandr Pechenkin (RUS), 18th place in Sprint
- Peppe Femling (SWE), 47th place in Sprint
- Gaspard Cuenot (SUI), 48th place in Sprint
- Maxim Braun (KAZ), 74th place in Sprint
- Martin Remmelg (EST), 75th place in Sprint
- Dzmitry Budzilovich (BLR), 83rd place in Sprint
- Marian Marcel Danila (ROU), 85th place in Sprint
- Tomas Krupcik (CZE), 21st place in Pursuit
- Oleksander Zhyrnyi (UKR), 49th place in Pursuit
- Elisabeth Högberg (SWE), 9th place in Individual
- Olga Podchufarova (RUS), 11th place in Individual
- Megan Heinicke (CAN), 12th place in Individual
- Luise Kummer (GER), 18th place in Individual
- Jitka Landová (CZE), 20th place in Individual and 18th in Pursuit
- Mona Brorsson (SWE), 31st place in Individual and 29th in Pursuit
- Olga Abramova (UKR), 37th place in Individual and 26th in Sprint
- Kaia Wøien Nicolaisen (NOR), 49th place in Individual
- Yurie Tanaka (JPN), 58th place in Individual
- Coline Varcin (FRA), 70th place in Individual and 19th in Sprint
- Tiril Eckhoff (NOR), 1st place in Sprint
- Enora Latuilliere (FRA), 10th place in Sprint
- Marine Bolliet (FRA), 11th place in Sprint and 8th in Pursuit
- Lisa Theresa Hauser (AUT), 13th place in Sprint
- Eva Puskarčíková (CZE), 17th place in Sprint and Pursuit
- Dunja Zdouc (AUT), 49th place in Sprint and 33rd in Pursuit
- Lucie Charvatova (FRA), 50th place in Sprint
- Lisa Vittozzi (ITA), 27th place in Pursuit
- Olga Iakushova (RUS), 38th place in Pursuit

First World Cup race

- Thomas Bermolini (ITA), 19th place in Individual
- Jeremy Finello (SUI), 26th place in Individual
- Tsukasa Kobonoki (JPN), 32nd place in Individual
- Maxim Braun (KAZ), 88th place in Individual
- Marian Marcel Danila (ROU), 90th place in Individual
- Dzmitry Budzilovich (BLR), 95th place in Individual
- Oleksander Zhyrnyi (UKR), 55th place in Sprint
- Michal Sima (SVK), 97th place in Sprint
- Enora Latuilliere (FRA), 13th place in Individual
- Karolin Horchler (GER), 24th place in Individual
- Anastasiya Merkushyna (UKR), 51st place in Individual
- Emma Nilsson (SWE), 56th place in Individual
- Yuliya Zhuravok (UKR), 59th place in Individual
- Dunja Zdouc (AUT), 74th place in Individual
- Anna Mąka (POL), 82nd place in Individual
- Flurina Volken (SUI), 84th place in Individual
- Nadiia Bielkina (UKR), 30th place in Sprint
- Lisa Vittozzi (ITA), 38th place in Sprint
- Olga Iakushova (RUS), 53rd place in Sprint
