= 2014–15 Biathlon World Cup – World Cup 6 =

The 2014–15 Biathlon World Cup – World Cup 6 was held in Rasen-Antholz, Italy, from 22 thru 25 January 2015.

== Schedule of events ==
Date	Time	Events
January 22	14:30 CET	Men's 10 km Sprint
January 23	14:30 CET	Women's 7.5 km Sprint
January 24	13:30 CET	Men's 12.5 km Pursuit
January 24	15:30 CET	Women's 10 km Pursuit
January 25	10:45 CET	Men's 4x7.5 km Relay
January 25	15:00 CET	Women's 4x6 km Relay

== Medal winners ==
=== Men ===
Event:	Gold:	Time	Silver:	Time	Bronze:	Time
10 km Sprint details	Simon Schempp; Germany	23:18.8 (0+0)	Evgeniy Garanichev; Russia	23:32.8 (0+0)	Jakov Fak; Slovenia	23:38.9 (0+1)
12.5 km Pursuit details	Simon Schempp; Germany	31:27.9 (1+1+0+0)	Simon Eder; Austria	31:28.0 (0+1+0+0)	Evgeniy Garanichev; Russia	31:29.0 (0+0+1+0)
4x7.5 km Relay details	Norway; Ole Einar Bjørndalen; Tarjei Bø; Johannes Thingnes Bø; Emil Hegle Svendsen	1:15:36.7 (0+1) (0+0) (0+1) (0+1) (0+2) (0+0) (0+0) (0+0)	Germany; Erik Lesser; Daniel Böhm; Arnd Peiffer; Simon Schempp	1:15:53.1 (0+0) (0+0) (0+0) (0+3) (0+0) (0+1) (0+1) (0+2)	France; Simon Fourcade; Quentin Fillon Maillet; Simon Desthieux; Jean-Guillaume Béatrix	1:16:18.7 (0+0) (0+0) (0+0) (0+1) (0+1) (0+2) (0+1) (0+0)

=== Women ===
Event:	Gold:	Time	Silver:	Time	Bronze:	Time
7.5 km Sprint details	Darya Domracheva; Belarus	19:57.8 (0+0)	Kaisa Mäkäräinen; Finland	20:24.7 (0+1)	Laura Dahlmeier; Germany	20:48.2 (0+0)
10 km Pursuit details	Darya Domracheva; Belarus	30:58.5 (1+0+0+0)	Daria Virolaynen; Russia	32:19.5 (0+0+0+1)	Kaisa Mäkäräinen; Finland	32:27.5 (2+0+1+2)
4x6 km Relay details	Germany; Franziska Hildebrand; Franziska Preuß; Luise Kummer; Laura Dahlmeier	1:18:47.7 (0+0) (2+3) (0+0) (0+3) (0+2) (0+2) (0+0) (0+0)	Czech Republic; Eva Puskarčíková; Gabriela Soukalová; Jitka Landová; Veronika Vítková	1:19:22.7 (0+2) (0+1) (0+1) (0+3) (0+3) (0+3) (0+1) (0+1)	Ukraine; Juliya Dzhyma; Natalya Burdyga; Olga Abramova; Valj Semerenko	1:19:33.0 (0+1) (0+2) (0+1) (0+3) (3+3) (0+0) (0+2) (0+2)

== Achievements ==
Best performance for all time

- Rok Trsan (SLO), 53rd place in Sprint
- Lenart Oblak (SLO), 61st place in Sprint
- Sean Doherty (USA), 63rd place in Sprint
- Remus Faur (ROU), 68th place in Sprint
- Laura Dahlmeier (GER), 3rd place in Sprint
- Jana Gereková (SVK), 4th place in Sprint
- Luise Kummer (GER), 13th place in Sprint
- Irina Trusova (RUS), 30th place in Pursuit
- Iryna Varvynets (UKR), 33rd place in Sprint
- Annika Knoll (GER), 35th place in Sprint

First World Cup race

- Dmitriy Dyuzhev (BLR), 88th place in Sprint
- Torstein Stenersen (SWE), 94th place in Sprint
