= 2014–15 Biathlon World Cup – World Cup 2 =

The 2014–15 Biathlon World Cup – World Cup 2 was held in Hochfilzen, Austria, from 12 December until 15 December 2014.

== Schedule of events ==
Date	Time	Events
December 12	11:30 CET	Women's 7.5 km Sprint
December 12	14:30 CET	Men's 10 km Sprint
December 13	11:00 CET	Women's 4x6 km Relay
December 13	14:30 CET	Men's 4x7.5 km Relay
December 14	11:30 CET	Women's 10 km Pursuit
December 14	14:30 CET	Men's 12.5 km Pursuit

== Medal winners ==
Detailed results at Datacenter details

=== Men ===
Event:	Gold:	Time	Silver:	Time	Bronze:	Time
10 km Sprint details	Johannes Thingnes Bø; Norway	24:34.9 (0+0)	Simon Schempp; Germany	24:49.2 (0+0)	Andreas Birnbacher; Germany	24:52.8 (0+0)
4x7.5 km Relay details	Russia; Maxim Tsvetkov; Timofey Lapshin; Dmitry Malyshko; Anton Shipulin	1:16:14.8 (0+0) (0+0) (0+1) (0+0) (0+0) (0+0) (0+0) (0+0)	France; Simon Fourcade; Jean-Guillaume Béatrix; Simon Desthieux; Martin Fourcade	1:16:35.0 (0+0) (0+0) (0+0) (0+1) (0+0) (0+2) (0+1) (0+0)	Norway; Johannes Thingnes Bø; Emil Hegle Svendsen; Lars Helge Birkeland; Tarjei Bø	1:16:42.7 (0+1) (0+0) (0+1) (0+0) (0+2) (0+3) (0+0) (0+3)
12.5 km Pursuit details	Martin Fourcade; France	32:53.7 (0+0+0+0)	Simon Schempp; Germany	32:57.8 (0+0+0+0)	Jakov Fak; Slovenia	33:04.6 (0+0+0+1)

=== Women ===
Event:	Gold:	Time	Silver:	Time	Bronze:	Time
7.5 km Sprint details	Kaisa Mäkäräinen; Finland	20:55.6 (1+0)	Karin Oberhofer; Italy	21:06.0 (0+0)	Tiril Eckhoff; Norway	21:25.5 (0+1)
4x6 km Relay details	Germany; Luise Kummer; Franziska Hildebrand; Vanessa Hinz; Franziska Preuß	1:11:40.4 (0+0) (0+1) (0+1) (0+3) (0+0) (0+2) (0+0) (0+1)	Belarus; Nadezhda Skardino; Nastassia Dubarezava; Nadzeya Pisareva; Darya Domracheva	1:12:01.5 (0+1) (0+0) (0+1) (0+3) (0+2) (0+2) (0+0) (0+1)	Czech Republic; Eva Puskarčíková; Gabriela Soukalová; Jitka Landová; Veronika Vítková	1:12:02.6 (0+1) (0+0) (0+0) (0+3) (0+1) (0+2) (0+1) (0+1)
10 km Pursuit details	Kaisa Mäkäräinen; Finland	30:44.8 (0+0+1+0)	Ekaterina Glazyrina; Russia	31:19.2 (1+0+0+0)	Anaïs Bescond; France	31:31.3 (0+0+1+0)

== Achievements ==
Best performance for all time

- Dzmitry Budzilovich (BLR), 71st place in Sprint
- Karin Oberhofer (ITA), 2nd place in Sprint
- Olga Podchufarova (RUS), 4th place in Sprint and Pursuit
- Vanessa Hinz (GER), 6th place in Sprint
- Fanny Welle-Strand Horn (NOR), 7th place in Sprint
- Terézia Poliaková (SVK), 42nd place in Sprint and 28th place in Pursuit
- Stefani Popova (BUL), 67th place in Sprint
- Ekaterina Glazyrina (RUS), 2nd place in Pursuit
- Rosanna Crawford (CAN), 5th place in Pursuit

First World Cup race

- Michael Willeitner (GER), 69th place in Sprint
- Rok Trsan (SLO), 76th place in Sprint
- George Buta (ROU), 84th place in Sprint
- Tuomas Grönman (FIN), 93rd place in Sprint
- Vassiliy Podkorytov (KAZ), 98th place in Sprint
- Krešimir Crnković (CRO), 103rd place in Sprint
- Justine Braisaz (FRA), 17th place in Sprint
- Sarah Beaudry (CAN), 63rd place in Sprint
- Kinga Mitoraj (POL), 80th place in Sprint
- Urska Poje (SLO), 86th place in Sprint
- Lena Haecki (SUI), 89th place in Sprint
