= 2014–15 Biathlon World Cup – World Cup 5 =

The 2014–15 Biathlon World Cup – World Cup 5 was held in Ruhpolding, Germany, from 14 January until 18 January 2015.

== Schedule of events ==
Date	Time	Events
January 14	14:30 CET	Women's 4x6 km Relay
January 15	14:30 CET	Men's 4x7.5 km Relay
January 16	15:00 CET	Women's 7.5 km Sprint
January 17	14:30 CET	Men's 10 km Sprint
January 18	12:30 CET	Women 12.5 km Mass Start
January 18	15:30 CET	Men 15 km Mass Start

== Medal winners ==
=== Men ===
Event:	Gold:	Time	Silver:	Time	Bronze:	Time
4x7.5 km Relay details	Norway; Ole Einar Bjørndalen; Erlend Bjøntegaard; Johannes Thingnes Bø; Emil Hegle Svendsen	1:09:42.3 (0+1) (0+0) (0+0) (0+1) (0+1) (0+3) (0+1) (0+1)	Germany; Erik Lesser; Andreas Birnbacher; Arnd Peiffer; Simon Schempp	1:09:46.9 (0+0) (0+1) (0+1) (0+0) (0+0) (0+1) (0+1) (0+0)	Russia; Evgeniy Garanichev; Timofey Lapshin; Alexey Volkov; Anton Shipulin	1:09:50.7 (0+0) (0+1) (0+2) (0+2) (0+1) (0+0) (0+1) (0+1)
10 km Sprint details	Johannes Thingnes Bø; Norway	23:59.2 (0+0)	Simon Schempp; Germany	24:23.7 (0+0)	Arnd Peiffer; Germany	24:57.1 (0+1)
15 km Mass Start details	Simon Schempp; Germany	35:42.8 (0+0+0+0)	Quentin Fillon Maillet; France	35:42.8 (0+0+0+0)	Michal Šlesingr; Czech Republic	35:42.8 (0+0+0+0)

=== Women ===
Event:	Gold:	Time	Silver:	Time	Bronze:	Time
4x6 km Relay details	Czech Republic; Eva Puskarčíková; Gabriela Soukalová; Jitka Landová; Veronika Vítková	1:23:57.7 (0+0) (0+0) (0+1) (0+2) (0+3) (0+1) (0+1) (0+1)	Belarus; Nadezhda Skardino; Iryna Kryuko; Nadzeya Pisareva; Darya Domracheva	1:25:11.0 (0+0) (0+2) (0+0) (0+0) (0+1) (0+2) (0+0) (0+1)	Germany; Franziska Preuß; Franziska Hildebrand; Vanessa Hinz; Laura Dahlmeier	1:25:37.0 (0+0) (1+3) (0+0) (0+2) (0+0) (0+1) (0+0) (0+0)
7.5 km Sprint details	Fanny Welle-Strand Horn; Norway	21:07.4 (0+0)	Darya Domracheva; Belarus	21:10.8 (0+0)	Tiril Eckhoff; Norway	21:16.7 (1+0)
12.5 km Mass Start details	Darya Domracheva; Belarus	35:17.5 (1+0+2+0)	Franziska Preuß; Germany	35:34.0 (0+1+1+0)	Veronika Vítková; Czech Republic	35:40.4 (1+1+1+0)

== Achievements ==
Best performance for all time

- Scott Gow (CAN), 27th place in Sprint
- Oleksander Zhyrnyi (UKR), 32nd place in Sprint
- Raman Yaliotnau (BLR), 48th place in Sprint
- George Buta (ROU), 69th place in Sprint
- Maxim Braun (KAZ), 70th place in Sprint
- Martin Remmelg (EST), 71st place in Sprint
- Sean Doherty (USA), 80th place in Sprint
- Dejan Krsmanovic (SRB), 95th place in Sprint
- Quentin Fillon Maillet (FRA), 2nd place in Mass Start
- Fanny Welle-Strand Horn (NOR), 1st place in Sprint
- Jitka Landová (CZE), 10th place in Sprint
- Megan Heinicke (CAN), 11th place in Sprint
- Olga Abramova (UKR), 24th place in Sprint
- Aita Gasparin (SUI), 25th place in Sprint
- Evgenia Seledtsova (RUS), 31st place in Sprint
- Iryna Varvynets (UKR), 33rd place in Sprint
- Ladina Meier-Ruge (SUI), 73rd place in Sprint
- Franziska Preuß (GER), 2nd place in Mass Start

First World Cup race

- Anton Babikov (RUS), 46th place in Sprint
- Dzmitry Abasheu (BLR), 59th place in Sprint
- Irina Trusova (RUS), 32nd place in Sprint
