= 2014–15 Biathlon World Cup – World Cup 4 =

The 2014–15 Biathlon World Cup – World Cup 4 was held in Oberhof, Germany, from 7 January until 11 January 2015.

== Schedule of events ==
| Date | Time | Events |
|---|---|---|
| January 7 | 14:15 CET | Women's 4x6 km Relay |
| January 8 | 14:15 CET | Men's 4x7.5 km Relay |
| January 9 | 14:30 CET | Women's 7.5 km Sprint |
| January 10 | 12:00 CET | Men's 10 km Sprint |
| January 11 | 11:15 CET | Women 12.5 km Mass Start |
| January 11 | 14:15 CET | Men 15 km Mass Start |

== Medal winners ==
=== Men ===
| Event: | Gold: | Time | Silver: | Time | Bronze: | Time |
|---|---|---|---|---|---|---|
| 4x7.5 km Relay details | Russia; Evgeniy Garanichev; Timofey Lapshin; Dmitry Malyshko; Anton Shipulin | 1:15:24.1 (0+1) (0+1) (0+2) (0+1) (0+3) (1+3) (0+0) (0+1) | Norway; Vetle Sjåstad Christiansen; Alexander Os; Johannes Thingnes Bø; Ole Einar Bjørndalen | 1:15:26.4 (0+0) (0+2) (0+0) (0+1) (0+0) (1+3) (0+1) (0+3) | France; Simon Fourcade; Jean-Guillaume Béatrix; Simon Desthieux; Quentin Fillon Maillet | 1:16:56.4 (0+1) (0+2) (0+1) (0+1) (0+2) (1+3) (0+1) (0+1) |
| 10 km Sprint details | Martin Fourcade; France | 27:02.5 (1+0) | Ole Einar Bjørndalen; Norway | 27:06.9 (0+1) | Timofey Lapshin; Russia | 27:20.0 (0+1) |
| 15 km Mass Start details | Martin Fourcade; France | 44:52.0 (0+0+0+0) | Anton Shipulin; Russia | 45:05.1 (1+1+1+1) | Dmitry Malyshko; Russia | 45:22.7 (1+0+0+3) |

=== Women ===
| Event: | Gold: | Time | Silver: | Time | Bronze: | Time |
|---|---|---|---|---|---|---|
| 4x6 km Relay details | Czech Republic; Eva Puskarčíková; Gabriela Soukalová; Jitka Landová; Veronika Vítková | 1:16:56.0 (0+0) (0+1) (0+1) (0+0) (0+1) (0+1) (0+1) (0+2) | France; Marine Bolliet; Marie Dorin Habert; Justine Braisaz; Anaïs Bescond | 1:17:04.9 (0+1) (0+1) (0+1) (0+0) (0+1) (0+2) (0+0) (0+2) | Belarus; Nadezhda Skardino; Nastassia Dubarezava; Nadzeya Pisareva; Darya Domracheva | 1:18:02.8 (0+0) (0+0) (0+0) (0+3) (0+0) (1+3) (0+1) (0+1) |
| 7.5 km Sprint details | Veronika Vítková; Czech Republic | 22:40.0 (1+1) | Dorothea Wierer; Italy | 22:48.8 (1+0) | Nicole Gontier; Italy | 22:59.1 (0+0) |
| 12.5 km Mass Start details | Darya Domracheva; Belarus | 42:36.6 (2+1+0+1) | Veronika Vítková; Czech Republic | 42:51.5 (1+0+0+1) | Tiril Eckhoff; Norway | 42:58.3 (1+1+0+0) |

== Achievements ==
Best performance for all time

- Artem Tyshchenko (UKR), 10th place in Sprint
- Yuryi Liadov (BLR), 11th place in Sprint
- Vladimir Chepelin (BLR), 18th place in Sprint
- Serafin Wiestner (SUI), 28th place in Sprint
- Tuomas Grönman (FIN), 62nd place in Sprint
- Marian Marcel Danila (ROU), 75th place in Sprint
- Dejan Krsmanovic (SRB), 99th place in Sprint
- Krasimir Anev (BUL), 4th place in Mass Start
- Veronika Vítková (CZE), 1st place in Sprint
- Nicole Gontier (ITA), 3rd place in Sprint
- Jana Gereková (SVK), 5th place in Mass Start
- Iryna Kryuko (BLR), 28th place in Sprint
- Lena Haecki (SUI), 30th place in Sprint
- Natalija Paulauskaite (LTU), 63rd place in Sprint

First World Cup race

- Christian Gow (CAN), 48th place in Sprint
- Roman Yaliotnau (BLR), 59th place in Sprint
- Viktar Kryuko (BLR), 68th place in Sprint
- Maikol Demetz (ITA), 82nd place in Sprint
- Roberts Slotins (LAT), 85th place in Sprint
- Vytautas Strolia (LTU), 87th place in Sprint
