= Gaspard Cuenot =

Swiss Nordic skier and biathlete

Personal information
- Born: 30 September 1991 (age 35) Neuchâtel, Switzerland

Sport
Medal record
Men's biathlon
Representing Switzerland
Podiums
Event	1st	2nd	3rd
Swiss Youth National Championships	2	0	0
Swiss Nordic Skiing Jr. National Championships	1	0	1
Swiss Junior National Championships	2	2	2
Swiss National Championships	2	0	0

Gaspard Cuenot (French: [ɡaspaʁ kɥəno]; born 30 September 1991) is a Nordic skier and a former biathlete.

== Career ==
Cuenot is a former biathlete racing for "SC La Brevine". Cuenot started his international career in 2008 in Austria at the IBU Cup. During the season 2008–09, Cuenot won two medals at the Swiss Nordic Championships including a gold medal at the 15 km classic mass start. In 2011, he participated at his first Junior World Championships in Torsby, Sweden. He ended up at the 12th position at the sprint and 10th position at the pursuit. Cuenot participated at three European Championships and three Junior World Championships during his career as a junior. In 2013, Cuenot took part at his first IBU World Cup in Ostersund (SWE). During the season 2014–15, he participated to multiple World Cup races and IBU Cups.

In March 2015, Cuenot won the Sprint and Pursuit of the Swiss National Championships in Lenzerheide (SUI). After his two gold medals, Gaspard Cuenot decided to quit the Swiss National Ski Team to join Michigan Tech Huskies. Since the season 2015–16, Cuenot is mostly racing FIS races for the MichiganTech University in North America. He took part of three D1 NCAA National Championships and scored a 12th position at the 2016 D1 NCAA in Steamboat Springs (USA). Gaspard Cuenot was 3 times nominated the MVP of the MichiganTech Huskies.
