= 2014–15 Biathlon World Cup – World Cup 3 =

The 2014–15 Biathlon World Cup – World Cup 3 was held in Pokljuka, Slovenia, from 18 December until 21 December 2014.

== Schedule of events ==
Date	Time	Events
December 18	14:25 CET	Women's 7.5 km Sprint
December 19	14:25 CET	Men's 10 km Sprint
December 20	11:15 CET	Women's 10 km Pursuit
December 20	13:30 CET	Men's 12.5 km Pursuit
December 21	11:30 CET	Women 12.5 km Mass Start
December 21	13:30 CET	Men 15 km Mass Start

== Medal winners ==
=== Men ===
Event:	Gold:	Time	Silver:	Time	Bronze:	Time
10 km Sprint details	Anton Shipulin; Russia	23:18.6 (0+0)	Dominik Landertinger; Austria	23:30.5 (0+0)	Emil Hegle Svendsen; Norway	23:42.7 (0+0)
12.5 km Pursuit details	Emil Hegle Svendsen; Norway	30:43.3 (0+0+0+0)	Anton Shipulin; Russia	31:01.1 (0+1+1+0)	Martin Fourcade; France	31:42.8 (0+0+1+0)
15 km Mass Start details	Anton Shipulin; Russia	35:16.8 (0+0+0+1)	Martin Fourcade; France	35:18.0 (0+0+0+1)	Simon Eder; Austria	35:18.2 (0+0+1+0)

=== Women ===
Event:	Gold:	Time	Silver:	Time	Bronze:	Time
7.5 km Sprint details	Gabriela Soukalová; Czech Republic	20:17.3 (0+0)	Dorothea Wierer; Italy	20:35.7 (0+1)	Valj Semerenko; Ukraine	20:42.0 (0+0)
10 km Pursuit details	Darya Domracheva; Belarus	29:55.9 (0+0+0+1)	Kaisa Mäkäräinen; Finland	30:05.9 (0+1+0+0)	Valj Semerenko; Ukraine	30:32.7 (0+0+1+0)
12.5 km Mass Start details	Kaisa Mäkäräinen; Finland	34:18.8 (0+0+2+0)	Anaïs Bescond; France	34:26.4 (0+0+0+0)	Nadezhda Skardino; Belarus	34:34.6 (0+0+0+0)

== Achievements ==
Best performance for all time

- Quentin Fillon Maillet (FRA), 8th place in Sprint
- Martin Otčenáš (SVK), 21st place in Sprint
- Joël Sloof (NED), 46th place in Sprint
- George Buta (ROU), 82nd place in Sprint
- Michal Krčmář (CZE), 15th place in Pursuit
- Grzegorz Guzik (POL), 57th place in Pursuit
- Dorothea Wierer (ITA), 2nd place in Sprint
- Rosanna Crawford (CAN), 4th place in Sprint
- Nicole Gontier (ITA), 8th place in Sprint
- Fuyuko Suzuki (JPN), 12th place in Sprint
- Justine Braisaz (FRA), 14th place in Sprint
- Hannah Dreissigacker (USA), 17th place in Sprint
- Kaia Wøien Nicolaisen (NOR), 29th place in Sprint
- Emma Nilsson (SWE), 55th place in Sprint
- Lena Haecki (SUI), 58th place in Sprint
- Patrycja Hojnisz (POL), 62nd place in Sprint
- Ivona Fialková (SVK), 74th place in Sprint

First World Cup race

- Evgenia Seledtsova (RUS), 46th place in Sprint
