= 2014–15 Biathlon World Cup – World Cup 9 =

The 2014–15 Biathlon World Cup – World Cup 9 was held in Khanty-Mansiysk, Russia, from 19 March until 22 March 2015.

== Schedule of events ==
| Date | Time | Events |
|---|---|---|
| March 19 | 13:45 CET | Men's 10 km Sprint |
| March 20 | 14:00 CET | Women's 7.5 km Sprint |
| March 21 | 10:30 CET | Men's 12.5 km Pursuit |
| March 21 | 14:00 CET | Women's 10 km Pursuit |
| March 22 | 10:00 CET | Men's 15 km Mass Start |
| March 22 | 12:05 CET | Women's 12.5 km Mass Start |

== Medal winners ==
=== Men ===
| Event: | Gold: | Time | Silver: | Time | Bronze: | Time |
|---|---|---|---|---|---|---|
| 10 km Sprint details | Martin Fourcade; France | 23:47.0 (0+0) | Anton Shipulin; Russia | 24:00.0 (0+0) | Benedikt Doll; Germany | 24:05.3 (0+1) |
| 12.5 km Pursuit details | Nathan Smith; Canada | 32:04.9 (0+0+0+1) | Benedikt Doll; Germany | 32:28.9 (0+0+1+1) | Anton Shipulin; Russia | 32:40.6 (1+1+0+2) |
| 15 km Mass Start details | Jakov Fak; Slovenia | 38:09.8 (0+0+0+0) | Anton Shipulin; Russia | 38:20.1 (1+0+1+0) | Tarjei Bø; Norway | 38:22.3 (1+0+0+0) |

=== Women ===
| Event: | Gold: | Time | Silver: | Time | Bronze: | Time |
|---|---|---|---|---|---|---|
| 7.5 km Sprint details | Kaisa Mäkäräinen; Finland | 19:49.1 (0+1) | Laura Dahlmeier; Germany | 20:03.3 (0+1) | Darya Domracheva; Belarus | 20:04.6 (1+1) |
| 10 km Pursuit details | Darya Domracheva; Belarus | 28:14.4 (0+1+0+0) | Laura Dahlmeier; Germany | 28:30.1 (0+0+0+0) | Franziska Preuß; Germany | 28:30.3 (0+0+0+0) |
| 12.5 km Mass Start details | Laura Dahlmeier; Germany | 35:08.2 (0+0+0+0) | Gabriela Soukalová; Czech Republic | 35:15.3 (0+0+0+0) | Marie Dorin Habert; France | 35:28.1 (0+0+1+1) |
