= 2014–15 Biathlon World Cup – World Cup 8 =

The 2014–15 Biathlon World Cup – World Cup 8 was held in Holmenkollen, Norway, from 12 February until 15 February 2015.

== Schedule of events ==
Date	Time	Events
February 12	10:30 CET	Women's 15 km Individual
February 12	14:15 CET	Men's 20 km Individual
February 14	11:15 CET	Women's 7.5 km Sprint
February 14	14:15 CET	Men's 10 km Sprint
February 15	12:15 CET	Women's 4 x 6 km Relay
February 15	14:30 CET	Men's 4 x 7.5 km Relay

== Medal winners ==
=== Men ===
Event:	Gold:	Time	Silver:	Time	Bronze:	Time
10 km Sprint details	Arnd Peiffer; Germany	24:57.0 (0+0)	Martin Fourcade; France	25:00.3 (0+0)	Anton Shipulin; Russia	25:12.4 (0+0)
20 km Individual details	Martin Fourcade; France	51:26.8 (0+0+0+0)	Evgeniy Garanichev; Russia	51:41.0 (0+0+0+0)	Serhiy Semenov; Ukraine	52:15.6 (0+0+0+0)
4 x 7.5 km Relay details	Russia; Evgeniy Garanichev; Maxim Tsvetkov; Dmitry Malyshko; Anton Shipulin	1:16:16.6 (0+1) (0+1) (0+0) (0+0) (1+3) (0+0) (0+0) (0+0)	Germany; Erik Lesser; Andreas Birnbacher; Arnd Peiffer; Simon Schempp	1:16:16.8 (0+0) (0+0) (0+0) (0+1) (0+3) (0+0) (0+1) (0+1)	Austria; Daniel Mesotitsch; Simon Eder; Sven Grossegger; Dominik Landertinger	1:17:07.5 (0+0) (0+1) (0+1) (0+0) (0+2) (0+0) (0+0) (0+2)

=== Women ===
Event:	Gold:	Time	Silver:	Time	Bronze:	Time
7.5 km Sprint details	Darya Domracheva; Belarus	20:35.7 (0+0)	Laura Dahlmeier; Germany	20:50.0 (0+0)	Marie Dorin Habert; France	21:05.6 (0+1)
15 km Individual details	Kaisa Mäkäräinen; Finland	43:54.8 (0+0+0+0)	Darya Domracheva; Belarus	45:13.1 (1+0+0+0)	Veronika Vítková; Czech Republic	45:15.7 (0+0+0+0)
4 x 6 km Relay details	Czech Republic; Eva Puskarčíková; Gabriela Soukalová; Jitka Landová; Veronika Vítková	1:11:10.6 (0+1) (0+0) (0+1) (0+0) (0+0) (0+0) (0+2) (0+1)	Italy; Dorothea Wierer; Nicole Gontier; Federica Sanfilippo; Karin Oberhofer	1:11:38.9 (0+0) (0+0) (0+1) (0+0) (0+0) (0+1) (0+0) (0+0)	France; Anaïs Bescond; Enora Latuillière; Coline Varcin; Marie Dorin Habert	1:11:56.5 (0+1) (0+1) (0+3) (0+0) (0+0) (0+0) (0+0) (0+0)
