= Artem Tyshchenko =

Ukrainian biathlete (born 1993)

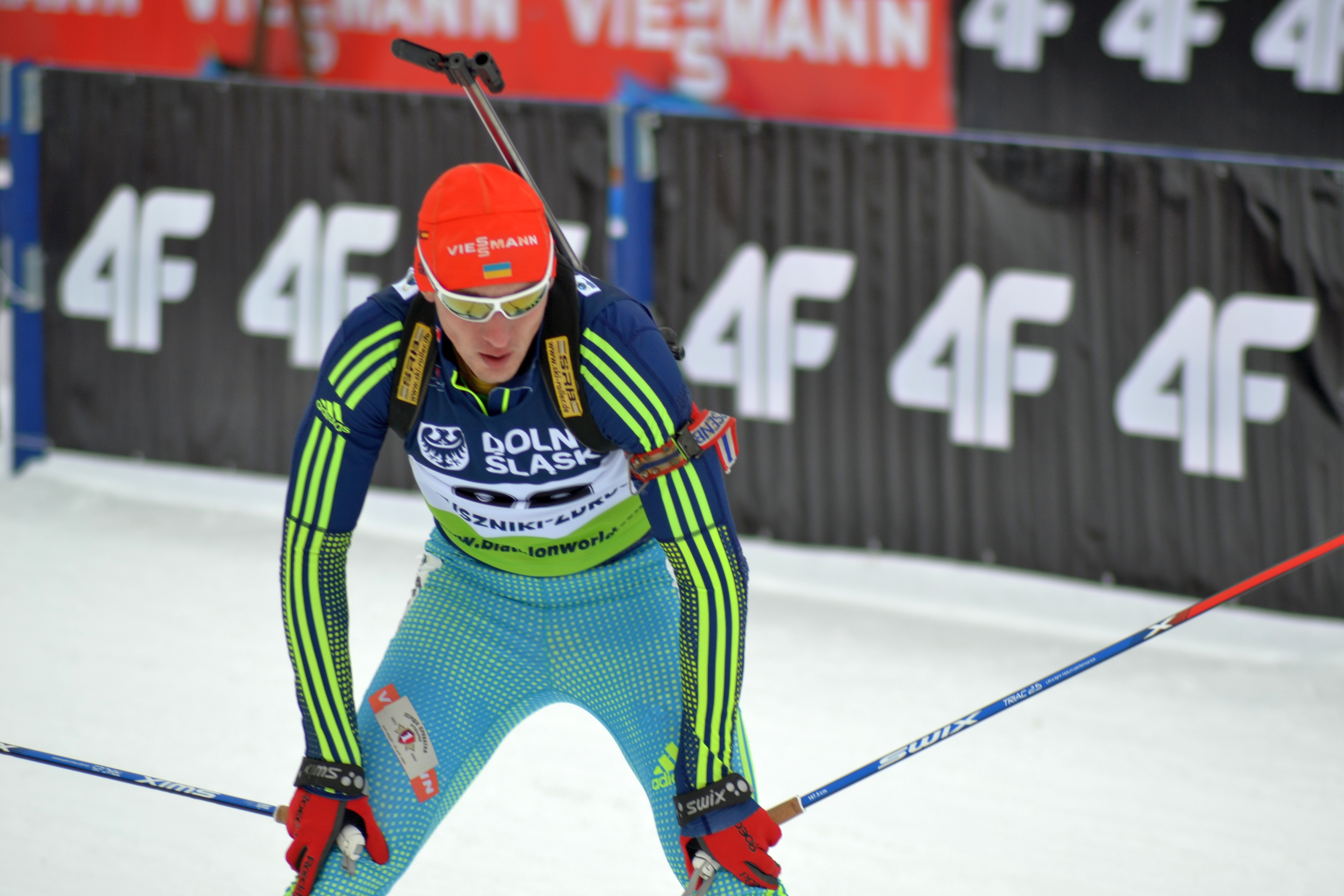

Personal information
- Full name: Artem Tyshchenko
- Born: 22 December 1993 (age 32) Zhovtneve, Bilopillia Raion, Sumy Oblast, Ukraine

Sport
- Sport: Skiing

World Cup career
- Seasons: 2013-
Medal record
Men's biathlon
Representing Ukraine
Youth World Championships
Bronze medal – third place	2012 Kontiolahti	12.5 km individual
Bronze medal – third place	2012 Kontiolahti	7.5 km sprint
Junior European Championships
Gold medal – first place	2014 Nové Město	Mixed relay
Gold medal – first place	2015 Otepää	Relay
Silver medal – second place	2014 Nové Město	Pursuit
Bronze medal – third place	2014 Nové Město	Individual
Bronze medal – third place	2013 Bansko	Mixed relay
Winter Universiade
Bronze medal – third place	2017 Almaty	Mixed relay
Men's summer biathlon
World Championships
Silver medal – second place	2024 Otepää	7.5 km super sprint
Bronze medal – third place	2023 Osrbile	7.5 km super sprint
- Updated on January 23, 2018

Artem Tyshchenko (Ukrainian: Артем Тищенко; born 22 December 1993) is a Ukrainian biathlete. He participated at the 2018 Winter Olympics.

== Career ==
Tyshchenko was a two-time bronze medalist of the 2012 Junior World Championships. During the next three years he won five medals at European championships. He debuted at the World Cup in the 2013-14 season in sprint in Antholz, Italy, where he placed 90th. It was the only time he played for the national team that year.

The next season he got a permanent spot in national team. In Oberhof he reached his personal best as of January 2018 - coming 10th in sprint. On February 6, 2015, he had his first World Cup relay podium in single mixed relay which debuted at the World Cup. He was third with Yuliya Dzhyma. At the end of the season Tyshchenko was named by IBU "best young biathlete". Next season wasn't successful - Tyshchenko competed at World Cup only in one race in Canadian Canmore where he placed 62nd.

On February 16, 2016, Artem was banned for violating doping laws by testing positive for the substance meldonium. Later the World Anti-Doping Agency decided that a concentration of meldonium less than 1 mcg could be acceptable if the doping probe was taken before March 1, 2016. All sanction against Tyshchenko were lifted on April 19.

On May 3, 2016, Tyshchenko survived a severe car accident. When he was on a way from Lviv to Sumy with his girlfriend Snizhana Tisyeyeva (a biathlete who competes for Moldova) his car burned out. Artem had a concussion and Snizhana experienced burns. She needed surgery for which the national federation and fans donated money. It was presumed that Artem fell asleep while driving at 5 am and crashed into speed bumps and then into a tree. He recovered to compete the next season in IBU Cup only. He participated at 2017 Winter Universiade where he won bronze in mixed relay.

During 2017-18 Biathlon World Cup he returned to Ukrainian national team but won no World Cup points. Coaches assumed that his results decline is caused by health problems after the car accident.

Artem qualified to represent Ukraine at the 2018 Winter Olympics. He competed in one race, placing 29th, the best result among Ukrainian biathletes.

== Results ==
=== Winter Olympics ===
Year	Event	IN	SP	PU	MS	RL	MRL
2018	Pyeongchang, South Korea	29	—	—	—	—	—

=== World Championships ===
Year	Event	IN	SP	PU	MS	RL	MRL
2015	Kontiolahti, Finland	60	—	—	—	—	—
2025	Lenzerheide, Switzerland	36	—	—	—	—	—

=== World Cup ===
==== Relay podiums ====
Season	Place	Competition	Placement
2014–15	Nové Město, Czech Republic	Single mixed relay	3
2018-19	Pokljuka, Slovenia	Single mixed relay	3

==== Rankings ====
Season	IN	SP	PU	MS	TOTAL
2014–15	62	54	—	48	60

=== IBU Cup ===
==== Relay podiums ====
Season	Place	Competition	Rank
2015–16	Arber, Germany	Single mixed relay	1
2016–17	Ridnaun, Italy	Single mixed relay	1
