= Nadzeya Pisarava =

Belarusian biathlete (born 1988)

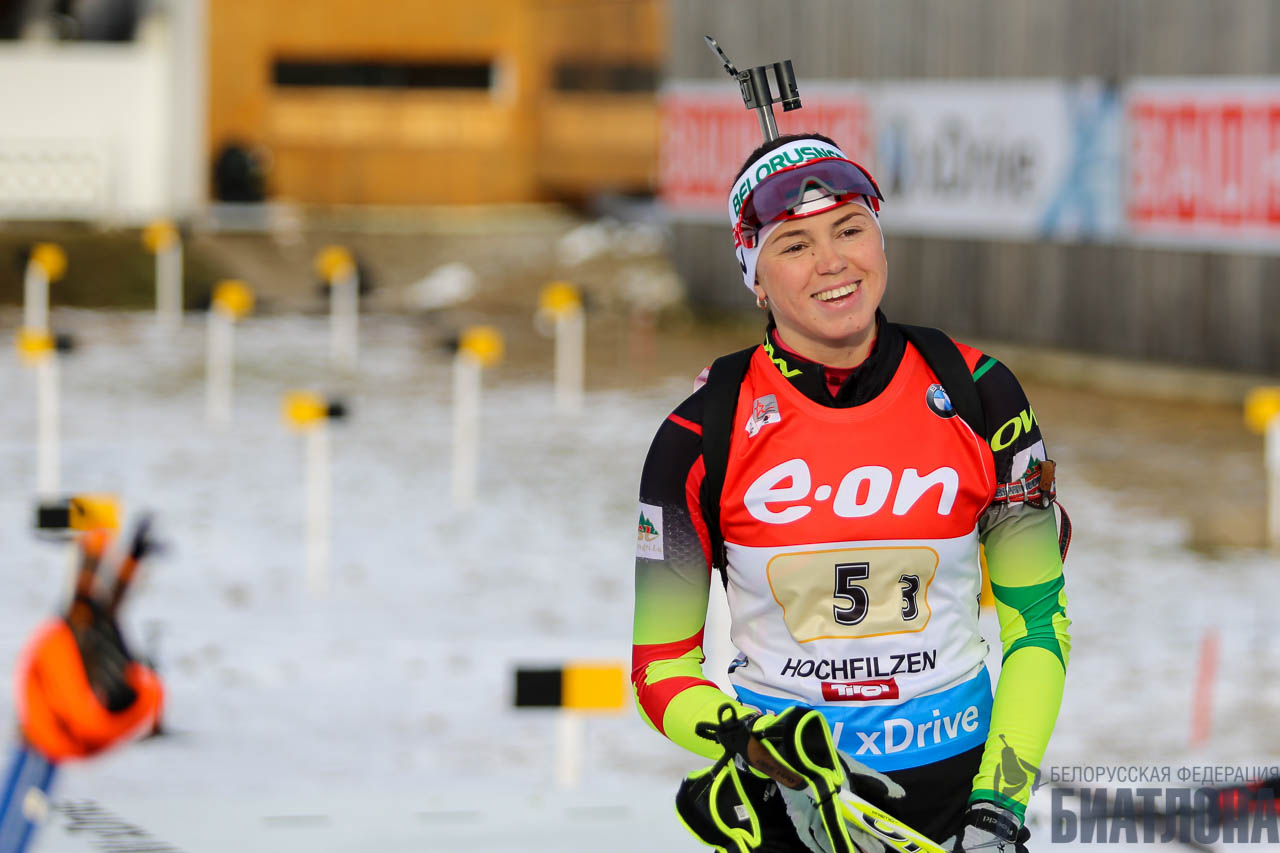

Medal record

Representing Belarus

Women's biathlon

World Championships
Bronze medal – third place	2011 Khanty-Mansiysk	4×6 km relay

Nadzeya Mikhaylauna Pisarava (Belarusian: Надзея Міхайлаўна Пісарава; born 5 July 1988) is a retired Belarusian biathlete. She competed at the Biathlon World Championships 2011, where she won a bronze medal in the relay with the Belarusian team. She was born in Kingisepp, Russia.

== Biathlon results ==
All results are sourced from the International Biathlon Union.

=== Olympic Games ===
0 medals

Event	Individual	Sprint	Pursuit	Mass start	Relay	Mixed relay
(Russia) 2014 Sochi	35th	—	—	—	4th	—
(South Korea) 2018 Pyeongchang	—	52nd	44th	—	—	—

=== World Championships ===
1 medal (1 bronze)

Event	Individual	Sprint	Pursuit	Mass start	Relay	Mixed relay
(Russia) 2011 Khanty-Mansiysk	—	64th	—	—	Bronze	—
(Finland) 2015 Kontiolahti	18th	49th	49th	—	6th	—
(Austria) 2017 Hochfilzen	—	61st	—	—	9th	—

*During Olympic seasons competitions are only held for those events not included in the Olympic program.
