= Olga Abramova (biathlete) =

Ukrainian biathlete (born 1988)

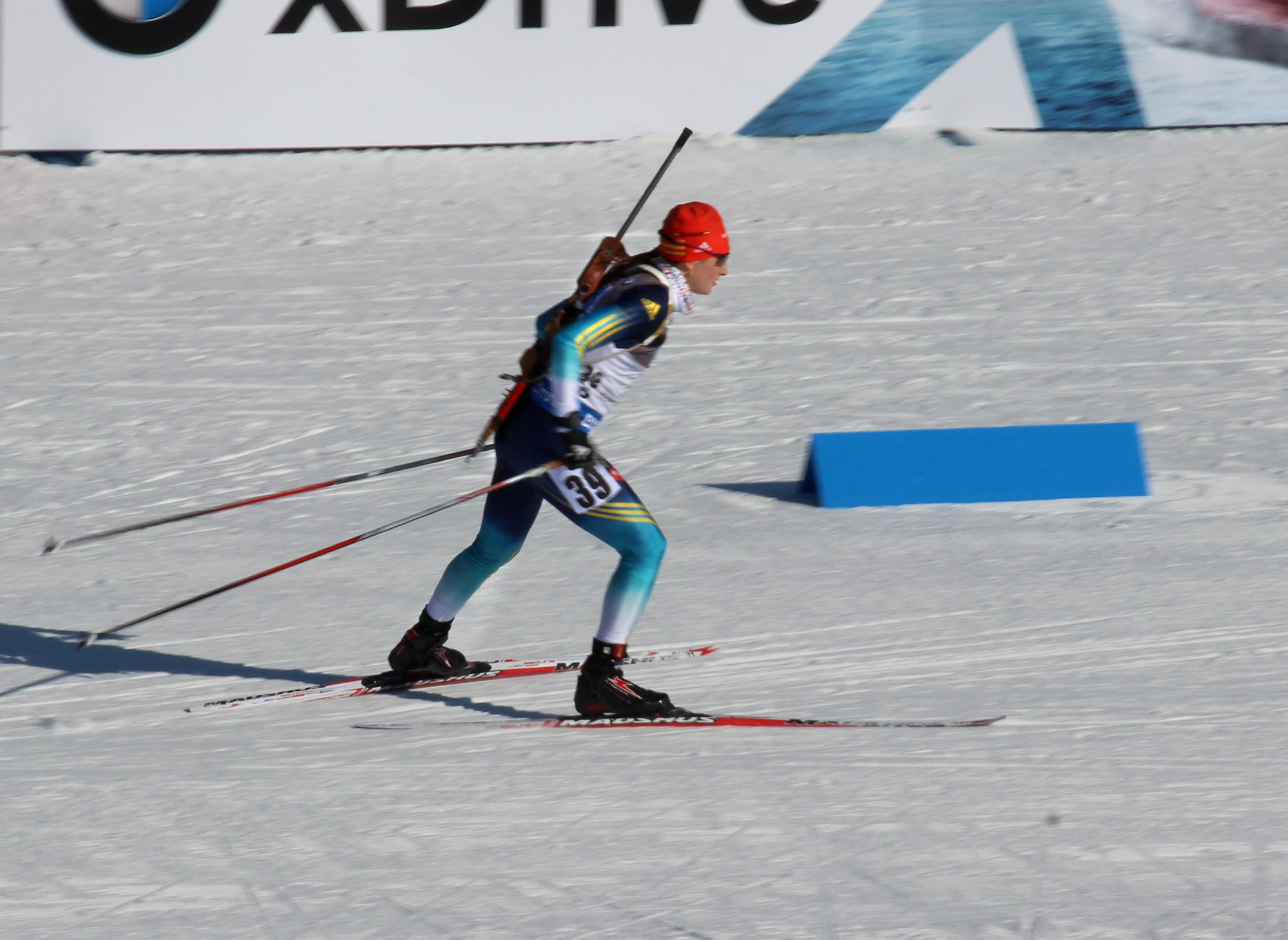

Personal information
- Born: 15 September 1988 (age 38) Barysh, Ulyanovsk Oblast, Russian SFSR, USSR

Sport
- Sport: Skiing

World Cup career
- Seasons: 2014–2022
- Indiv. podiums: 2
- Updated on 24 April 2024

Olga Abramova (Ukrainian: Ольга Абрамова; born 15 September 1988) is a former Russian (2011-2012) and Ukrainian (2012-2022) biathlete. Having little success in the Russian team, she changed her citizenship to Ukrainian in 2012. She made her World Cup debut at the 2013–14 season in Antholz, Italy and went on to become a regular member of the Ukrainian team. On 10 January 2016 she failed a drug test when meldonium was found in her doping test. Meldonium became illegal to use on 1 January 2016.

== Performances ==
Level	Year	Event	IN	SP	PU	MS	RL	MRL
EBCH	2014	Nové Město, Czech Republic	DNF				6	
EBCH	2015	Otepää, Estonia		26	DNS		6	
BWCH	2015	Kontiolahti, Finland		9	10	28	6	

=== World Cup ===
==== Podiums ====
Season	Place	Competition	Placement
2014–15	Antholz, Italy	Relay	3
2015–16	Hochfilzen, Austria	Relay	3
2016–17	Kontiolahti, Finland	Mixed relay	3

==== Positions ====
Season	Overall		Individual		Sprint		Pursuit		Mass start	
Season	Points	Position	Points	Position	Points	Position	Points	Position	Points	Position
2013–14	3	100th	—	—	3	89th	—	—	—	—
2014–15	173	40th	5	63rd	107	30th	69	32nd	8	49th
2015–16	213	35th	25	36th	69	39th	79	35th	40	32nd
2016–17	3	100th	—	—	—	—	3	82nd	—	—
