= Luise Kummer =

German biathlete

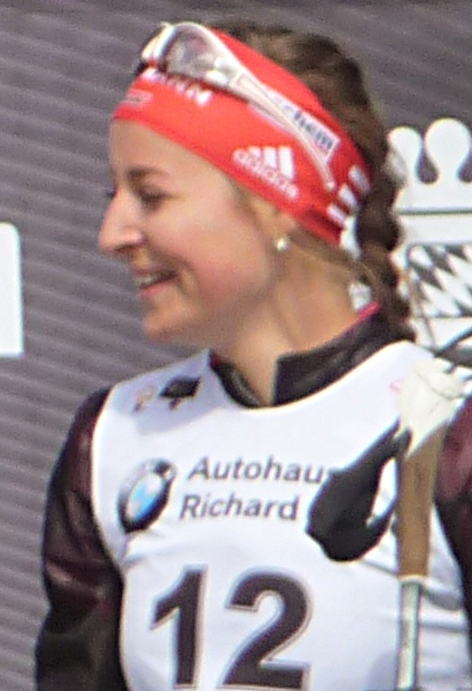

Personal information
- Nationality: German
- Born: 29 June 1993 (age 33) Jena
- Occupation: Biathlete
Medal record
Women's biathlon
Representing Germany
European Championships
Gold medal – first place	2016 Tyumen	12.5 mass start
Silver medal – second place	2016 Tyumen	single mixed relay
Junior World Championships
Gold medal – first place	2014 Presque Isle	12.5 km individual
Gold medal – first place	2014 Presque Isle	3 × 6 km relay
Silver medal – second place	2014 Presque Isle	10 km pursuit

Luise Kummer (born 29 June 1993 in Jena) is a retired German biathlete. She competed in the 2014/15 World Cup season, and represented Germany at the Biathlon World Championships 2015 in Kontiolahti.
