= Jitka Landová =

Czech biathlete (born 1990)

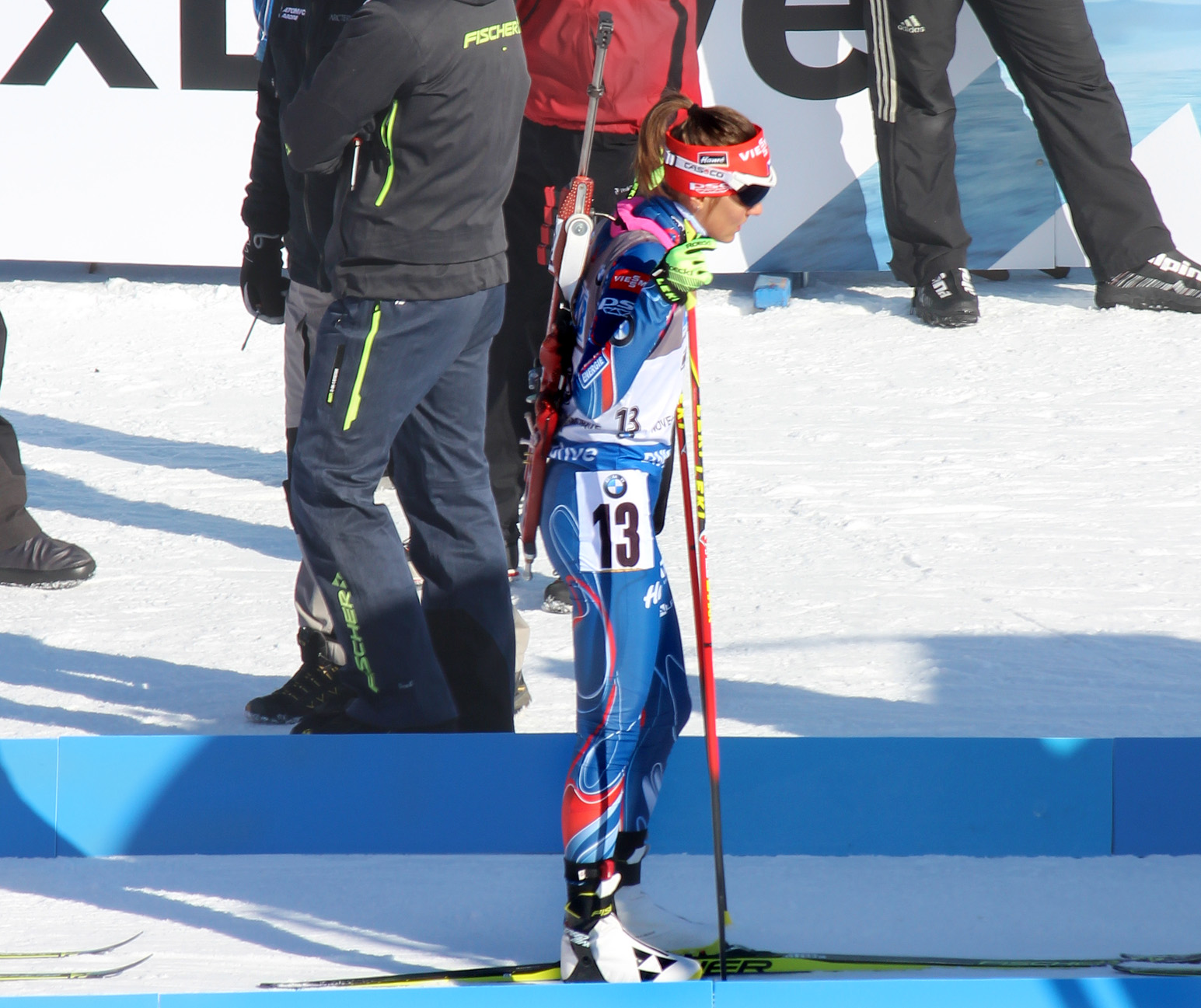

Personal information
- Born: 20 July 1990 (age 36) Jablonec nad Nisou, Czechoslovakia

Sport
- Sport: Skiing

World Cup career
- Indiv. podiums: 5 (all in relay)
- Indiv. wins: 3 (all in relay)
Medal record
Women's biathlon
Representing Czech Republic
Olympic Games
Bronze medal – third place	2014 Sochi	4 x 6 km relay
European Championships
Bronze medal – third place	2013 Bansko	4 x 6 km relay
Winter Universiade
Gold medal – first place	2013 Trentino	Mass start
Gold medal – first place	2015 Osrblie	Mass start
Bronze medal – third place	2013 Trentino	Individual
Bronze medal – third place	2013 Trentino	Mixed relay
Bronze medal – third place	2015 Osrblie	Sprint

Jitka Landová (born 20 July 1990 in Jablonec nad Nisou) is a former Czech biathlete, AND a double Winter Universiade winner in the mass start competition. She competed at the Biathlon World Championships 2012 in Ruhpolding and at the Biathlon World Championships 2013 in Nové Město na Moravě. She competed at the 2014 Winter Olympics in Sochi. Her best result here was 3rd place in relay, shared with her Czech teammates Eva Puskarčíková, Gabriela Soukalová and Veronika Vítková. Apart from that, she also competed in sprint, pursuit and individual.
