= Summer Biathlon World Championships =

Annual summer biathlon championships

- Status: active
- Genre: sports event
- Date: midyear
- Frequency: annual
- Inaugurated: 1996
- Organiser: IBU

The Summer Biathlon World Championships are the world championships in summer biathlon which have been held annually since 1996 (one unofficial edition in 1991). Junior events was added since 2000.

== Styles ==
1. 1996 - 2005: Cross (Trail)
2. 2006 - 2009: Cross (Trail) + Roller
3. 2010 - Ongoing: Roller

== Editions ==
Since 1996:

Edition	Year	Host country	Events
Cross
1	1996	Austria	4
2	1997	Poland	6
3	1998	Slovakia	6
4	1999	Belarus	6
5	2000	Russia	12
6	2001	Poland	12
7	2002	Czech Republic	12
8	2003	Italy	16
9	2004	Slovakia	16
10	2005	Finland	16
Cross + Roller
11	2006	Russia	18
12	2007	Estonia	18
13	2008	France	18
14	2009	Germany	18
Roller
15	2010	Poland	10
16	2011	Czech Republic	10
17	2012	Russia	10
18	2013	Italy	10
19	2014	Russia	10
20	2015	Romania	10
21	2016	Estonia	10
22	2017	Russia	10
23	2018	Czech Republic	10
24	2019	Belarus	12
26	2021	Czech Republic	12
27	2022	Germany	12
28	2023	Slovakia	12
29	2024	Estonia	12
Total			328

- 2020 in Germany was cancelled.

== Trail running (until 2009) ==
=== Men ===
==== Individual (10 km) ====
Year	Location	Gold	Silver	Bronze
1991	(United States) Lake Placid	Sergei Tarasov (RUS)	Alexandr Popov (RUS)	Dave McMahon (CAN)

Year	Location	Gold	Silver	Bronze
1996	(Austria) Hochfilzen	Alexei Kobelev (RUS)	Janez Ožbolt (SLO)	Vadim Sashurin (BLR)

==== Sprint (6 km) ====
Year	Location	Gold	Silver	Bronze
1996	(Austria) Hochfilzen	Wilfried Pallhuber (ITA)	Ole Einar Bjørndalen (NOR)	Vladimir Drachev (RUS)
1997	(Poland) Kraków	Wilfried Pallhuber (ITA)	Dimitri Borovik (EST)	Ole Einar Bjørndalen (NOR)
1998	(Slovakia) Brezno-Osrblie	Alexei Kobelev (RUS)	Wilfried Pallhuber (ITA)	Oleg Rudenko (RUS)
1999	(Belarus) Minsk	Rustam Valiullin (BLR)	Vadim Sashurin (BLR)	Alexei Kobelev (RUS)
2000	(Russia) Khanty-Mansiysk	Indrek Tobreluts (EST)	Dmitriy Nikiforov (RUS)	Ilmārs Bricis (LAT)
2001	(Poland) Duszniki-Zdrój	Dimitri Borovik (EST)	Alexey Kovyazin (RUS)	Maciej Wojciechowski (POL)
2002	(Czech Republic) Jablonec nad Nisou	Marek Matiaško (SVK)	Maksim Malenkih (KGZ)	Michael Genz (GER)
2003	(Italy) Forni Avoltri	Olexander Bilanenko (UKR)	Alexey Kovyazin (RUS)	Marko Dolenc (SLO)
2004	(Slovakia) Brezno-Osrblie	Zdeněk Vítek (CZE)	Indrek Tobreluts (EST)	Dimitri Borovik (EST)
2005	(Finland) Muonio	Alexander Kachanovski (RUS)	Alexandr Syman (BLR)	Alexandr Ustinov (BLR)
2006	(Russia) Ufa	Sergey Balandin (RUS)	Indrek Tobreluts (EST)	Dmitriy Nikiforov (RUS)
2007	(Estonia) Otepää	Olexander Bilanenko (UKR)	Marek Matiaško (SVK)	Alexey Katrenko (RUS)
2008	(France) Haute Maurienne	Alexey Katrenko (RUS)	Dias Keneshev (KAZ)	Ruslan Nasirov (UZB)
2009	(Germany) Oberhof	Alexey Katrenko (RUS)	Ruslan Nasirov (UZB)	Miroslav Matiaško (SVK)

==== Pursuit (8 km) ====
This event was not held in 2007.

Year	Location	Gold	Silver	Bronze
1997	(Poland) Kraków	Wilfried Pallhuber (ITA)	Konstantin Popov (RUS)	Vadim Sashurin (BLR)
1998	(Slovakia) Brezno-Osrblie	Wilfried Pallhuber (ITA)	Alexei Kobelev (RUS)	Konstantin Popov (RUS)
1999	(Belarus) Minsk	Vadim Sashurin (BLR)	Ilmārs Bricis (LAT)	Alexei Kobelev (RUS)
2000	(Russia) Khanty-Mansiysk	Dmitriy Nikiforov (RUS)	Indrek Tobreluts (EST)	Alexey Kovyazin (RUS)
2001	(Poland) Duszniki-Zdrój	Ilmārs Bricis (LAT)	Dimitri Borovik (EST)	Ivan Pesterev (BLR)
2002	(Czech Republic) Jablonec nad Nisou	Dmitriy Nikiforov (RUS)	Marko Dolenc (SLO)	Marek Matiaško (SVK)
2003	(Italy) Forni Avoltri	Alexey Kovyazin (RUS)	Olexander Bilanenko (UKR)	Oleg Rudenko (RUS)
2004	(Slovakia) Brezno-Osrblie	Zdeněk Vítek (CZE)	Sergey Balandin (RUS)	Alexey Mironov (RUS)
2005	(Finland) Muonio	Alexander Kachanovski (RUS)	Jaroslav Soukup (CZE)	Rustam Valiullin (BLR)
2006	(Russia) Ufa	Sergey Balandin (RUS)	Indrek Tobreluts (EST)	Ondřej Moravec (CZE)
2008	(France) Haute Maurienne	Alexey Katrenko (RUS)	Sergey Balandin (RUS)	Dias Keneshev (KAZ)
2009	(Germany) Oberhof	Alexey Katrenko (RUS)	Ruslan Nasirov (UZB)	Alexander Kachanovski (RUS)

==== Mass start (8 km) ====
This event was first held in 1990. It was not held in 2006, and last held in 2007.

Year	Location	Gold	Silver	Bronze
2003	(Italy) Forni Avoltri	Olexander Bilanenko (UKR)	Vyacheslav Derkach (UKR)	Marek Matiaško (SVK)
2004	(Slovakia) Brezno-Osrblie	Pavol Hurajt (SVK)	Timur Nurmeev (RUS)	Alexey Mironov (RUS)
2005	(Finland) Muonio	Alexandr Syman (BLR)	Alexei Kobelev (RUS)	Jaroslav Soukup (CZE)
2007	(Estonia) Otepää	Alexey Katrenko (RUS)	Indrek Tobreluts (EST)	Ivan Bogdanov (RUS)

==== Relay (4 × 6 km) ====
This event was first held in 1997 and last held in 2005. From 1997 to 2002 the distance was 4 × 6 km.

Year	Location	Gold	Silver	Bronze
1997	(Poland) Kraków	Norway; Egil Gjelland; Jon Per Nygaard; Dag Bjørndalen; Ole Einar Bjørndalen	Russia; Oleg Rudenko; Dmitriy Nikiforov; Konstantin Popov; Sergey Rusinov	Estonia; Dimitri Borovik; Roland Lessing; Indrek Tobreluts; Kalju Ojaste
1998	(Slovakia) Brezno-Osrblie	Russia; Oleg Rudenko; Konstantin Popov; Sergei Konovalov; Vladimir Bekhterev	Ukraine; Mykhaylo Syzon; Yuriy Dmitrenko; Olexander Bilanenko; Vyacheslav Derkach	Poland; Grzegorz Grzywa; Tomasz Sikora; Kazimier Urbaniak; Wojciech Kozub
1999	(Belarus) Minsk	Russia; Alexei Kobelev; Sergey Prosvirnin; Alexsey Kovyazin; Dmitriy Nikiforov	Latvia; Oļegs Maļuhins; Gundars Upenieks; Jēkabs Nākums; Ilmārs Bricis	Estonia; Dimitri Borovik; Roland Lessing; Indrek Tobreluts; Margus Ader
2000	(Russia) Khanty-Mansiysk	Russia; Alexsey Kovyazin; Andrei Prokunin; Dmitriy Nikiforov; Sergey Prosvirnin	Latvia; Oļegs Maļuhins; Gundars Upenieks; Jēkabs Nākums; Ilmārs Bricis	Estonia; Dimitri Borovik; Roland Lessing; Indrek Tobreluts; Janno Prants
2001	(Poland) Duszniki-Zdrój	Belarus; Alexei Aidarov; Rustam Valiullin; Alexandr Ustinov; Ivan Pesterev	Latvia; Oļegs Maļuhins; Ilmārs Bricis; Jēkabs Nākums; Gundars Upenieks	Russia; Alexsey Kovyazin; Dmitriy Nikiforov; Ivan Bogdanov; Alexei Cheparev
2002	(Czech Republic) Jablonec nad Nisou	Russia; Alexei Kobelev; Pavel Chupriyanov; Sergey Prosvirnin; Dmitriy Nikiforov	Belarus; Ivan Pesterev; Sergey Novikov; Alexandr Ustinov; Vadim Sashurin	Slovakia; Marek Matiaško; Radovan Cienik; Pavol Novák; Davorín Škvaridlo
2003	(Italy) Forni Avoltri	Ukraine; Olexander Bilanenko; Andriy Deryzemlya; Alexei Korobeynikov; Vyacheslav Derkach	Russia; Oleg Rudenko; Alexei Cheparev; Timur Nurmeev; Alexsey Kovyazin	Slovakia; Marek Matiaško; Radovan Cienik; Davorín Škvaridlo; Pavol Hurajt
2004	(Slovakia) Brezno-Osrblie	Belarus; Alexandr Syman; Rustam Valiullin; Alexandr Ustinov; Ivan Pesterev	Russia; Alexey Mironov; Timur Nurmeev; Alexei Cheparev; Sergey Balandin	Slovakia; Pavol Hurajt; Radovan Cienik; Miroslav Matiaško; Marek Matiaško
2005	(Finland) Muonio	Czech Republic; Michal Šlesingr; Ondřej Moravec; Miroslav Tomeš; Jaroslav Soukup	Russia; Alexei Kobelev; Oleg Rudenko; Ivan Bogdanov; Alexander Kachanovski	Belarus; Alexandr Ustinov; Sergey Novikov; Rustam Valiullin; Alexandr Syman

=== Women ===
==== Individual (4 km) ====
This event was only held in 1996.

Year	Location	Gold	Silver	Bronze
1996	(Austria) Hochfilzen	Olessia Toupilenko (RUS)	Gunn Margit Andreassen (NOR)	Liu Jinfeng (CHN)

==== Sprint (3 km) ====
From 1996 to 2002 the distance was 4 km.

Year	Location	Gold	Silver	Bronze
1996	(Austria) Hochfilzen	Yu Shumei (CHN)	Olessia Toupilenko (RUS)	Inna Sheshkil (KAZ)
1997	(Poland) Kraków	Olga Nazarova (BLR)	Irina Tananaiko (BLR)	Larisa Timchina (MDA)
1998	(Slovakia) Brezno-Osrblie	Nadezhda Talanova (RUS)	Nina Lemesh (UKR)	Adrianna Babik (POL)
1999	(Belarus) Minsk	Svetlana Ishmouratova (RUS)	Natalia Levchenkova (RUS)	Magdalena Grzywa (POL)
2000	(Russia) Khanty-Mansiysk	Natalya Sokolova (RUS)	Evgenia Mikhaylova (RUS)	Olga Nazarova (BLR)
2001	(Poland) Duszniki-Zdrój	Natalya Sokolova (RUS)	Evgenia Mikhaylova (RUS)	Olga Nazarova (BLR)
2002	(Czech Republic) Jablonec nad Nisou	Olga Nazarova (BLR)	Magdalena Grzywa (POL)	Ludmila Arlouskaya (BLR)
2003	(Italy) Forni Avoltri	Olga Nazarova (BLR)	Olena Zubrilova (BLR)	Inna Kasimova (RUS)
2004	(Slovakia) Brezno-Osrblie	Olga Nazarova (BLR)	Oksana Neupokoeva (RUS)	Svetlana Khandohina (BLR)
2005	(Finland) Muonio	Natalya Sokolova (BLR)	Tatiana Moiseeva (RUS)	Lubov Ermolaeva (RUS)
2006	(Russia) Ufa	Natalya Sokolova (BLR)	Ekaterina Sidorenko (RUS)	Tatiana Moiseeva (RUS)
2007	(Estonia) Otepää	Natalya Sokolova (BLR)	Elena Khrustaleva (KAZ)	Lyudmyla Pysarenko (UKR)
2008	(France) Haute Maurienne	Ekaterina Sidorenko (RUS)	Lubov Ermolaeva (RUS)	Anastasia Kuznetsova (RUS)
2009	(Germany) Oberhof	Iryna Babetskaya (BLR)	Olga Nazarova (BLR)	Juliane Döll (GER)

==== Pursuit (5 km) ====
From 1997 to 2002 the distance was 6 km. This event was not held in 2007.

Year	Location	Gold	Silver	Bronze
1997	(Poland) Kraków	Olga Nazarova (BLR)	Olessia Toupilenko (RUS)	Irina Tananaiko (BLR)
1998	(Slovakia) Brezno-Osrblie	Martina Schwarzbacherová (SVK)	Nina Lemesh (UKR)	Magdalena Grzywa (POL)
1999	(Belarus) Minsk	Natalya Sokolova (RUS)	Svetlana Ishmouratova (RUS)	Natalia Levchenkova (RUS)
2000	(Russia) Khanty-Mansiysk	Natalya Sokolova (RUS)	Olga Nazarova (BLR)	Evgenia Mikhaylova (RUS)
2001	(Poland) Duszniki-Zdrój	Evgenia Mikhaylova (RUS)	Natalya Sokolova (RUS)	Olga Nazarova (BLR)
2002	(Czech Republic) Jablonec nad Nisou	Olga Nazarova (BLR)	Magdalena Grzywa (POL)	Ludmila Arlouskaya (BLR)
2003	(Italy) Forni Avoltri	Olga Nazarova (BLR)	Olena Zubrilova (BLR)	Inna Kasimova (RUS)
2004	(Slovakia) Brezno-Osrblie	Olga Nazarova (BLR)	Svetlana Khandohina (BLR)	Lubov Ermolaeva (RUS)
2005	(Finland) Muonio	Natalya Sokolova (BLR)	Tatiana Moiseeva (RUS)	Lubov Ermolaeva (RUS)
2006	(Russia) Ufa	Tatiana Moiseeva (RUS)	Natalya Sokolova (BLR)	Ekaterina Sidorenko (RUS)
2008	(France) Haute Maurienne	Ekaterina Sidorenko (RUS)	Lubov Ermolaeva (RUS)	Anastasia Kuznetsova (RUS)
2009	(Germany) Oberhof	Natalya Sokolova (RUS)	Olga Nazarova (BLR)	Elena Khrustaleva (KAZ)

==== Mass start (5 km) ====
This event was first held in 2003. It was not held in 2006, and last held in 2007.

Year	Location	Gold	Silver	Bronze
2003	(Italy) Forni Avoltri	Tatiana Moiseeva (RUS)	Olga Nazarova (BLR)	Olena Zubrilova (BLR)
2004	(Slovakia) Brezno-Osrblie	Olga Nazarova (BLR)	Lubov Ermolaeva (RUS)	Svetlana Khandohina (BLR)
2005	(Finland) Muonio	Natalya Sokolova (BLR)	Tatiana Moiseeva (RUS)	Olga Nazarova (BLR)
2007	(Estonia) Otepää	Natalya Sokolova (BLR)	Elena Khrustaleva (KAZ)	Natalia Sorokina (RUS)

==== Relay (4 × 3 km) ====
This event was first held in 1997 and last held in 2005. From 1997 to 2002 the distance was 4 × 4 km.

Year	Location	Gold	Silver	Bronze
1997	(Poland) Kraków	Belarus; Irina Tananaiko; Natalia Permiakova; Natalia Moroz; Svetlana Paramygina	Slovakia; Martina Halinárová; Anna Murínová; Marcela Pavkovčeková; Soňa Mihoková	Poland; Magdalena Grzywa; Iwona Grzywa; Adrianna Babik; Dorota Gruca
1998	(Slovakia) Brezno-Osrblie	Belarus; Irina Tananaiko; Natalia Ryzhenkova; Natalia Murschtschakina; Svetlana Paramygina	Slovakia; Martina Schwarzbacherová; Anna Murínová; Tatiana Kutlíková; Marcela Pavkovčeková	Russia; Olga Palikova; Elena Safarova; Elena Dumnova; Nadezhda Talanova
1999	(Belarus) Minsk	Russia; Natalia Levchenkova; Evgenia Mikhaylova; Natalya Sokolova; Svetlana Ishmouratova	Belarus; Inna Sheshkil; Natalia Permiakova; Irina Tananaiko; Svetlana Paramygina	Ukraine; Oksana Glova; Oksana Yakovleva; Tetiana Lytovchenko; Iryna Merkushina
2000	(Russia) Khanty-Mansiysk	Belarus; Irina Tananaiko; Svetlana Paramygina; Ludmila Arlouskaya; Olga Nazarova	Russia; Svetlana Dementyeva; Evguenia Koutsepalova; Natalya Sokolova; Evgenia Mikhaylova	United States; Ann Sorenson; Kristina Sabasteanski; Jill Troutner; Nicole Hunt
2001	(Poland) Duszniki-Zdrój	Russia; Raisa Matveeva; Evgenia Mikhaylova; Natalya Sokolova; Oksana Neupokoeva	Belarus; Irina Tananaiko; Ksenia Zikounkova; Ludmila Arlouskaya; Olga Nazarova	Ukraine; Tetiana Lytovchenko; Olena Demydenko; Lyudmyla Sahaydak; Olena Zubrilova
2002	(Czech Republic) Jablonec nad Nisou	Russia; Raisa Matveeva; Natalia Artsybacheva; Olesya Fedoseeva; Lubov Ermolaeva	Belarus; Olena Zubrilova; Ksenia Zikounkova; Ludmila Arlouskaya; Olga Nazarova	Czech Republic; Pavla Matyášová; Zdeňka Vejnarová; Irena Česneková; Kateřina Holubcová
2003	(Italy) Forni Avoltri	Belarus; Ekaterina Ivanova; Olena Zubrilova; Liudmila Ananko; Olga Nazarova	Russia; Inna Kasimova; Oksana Neupokoeva; Natalia Artsybacheva; Tatiana Moiseeva	Italy; Maryke Ciaramidaro; Romina Demetz; Katja Haller; Dominique Vallet
2004	(Slovakia) Brezno-Osrblie	Belarus; Svetlana Khandohina; Ekaterina Ivanova; Liudmila Kalinchik; Olga Nazarova	Russia; Lubov Ermolaeva; Anna Sotnikova; Natalia Artsybacheva; Oksana Neupokoeva	Slovakia; Zuzana Hasillová; Anna Murínová; Petra Slezáková; Soňa Mihoková
2005	(Finland) Muonio	Belarus; Ekaterina Ivanova; Olga Nazarova; Ksenia Zikounkova; Natalya Sokolova	Russia; Lubov Ermolaeva; Evgenia Mikhaylova; Ekaterina Sidorenko; Tatiana Moiseeva	Czech Republic; Tereza Hlavsová; Pavla Matyášová; Klára Moravcová; Michaela Balatková

=== Mixed ===
==== Relay (2 × 3 km + 2 × 4 km) ====
This event was only held in 2006 and 2007.

Year	Location	Gold	Silver	Bronze
2006	(Russia) Ufa	Russia; Ekaterina Sidorenko; Evgenia Mikhaylova; Dmitriy Nikiforov; Sergey Balandin	Czech Republic; Pavla Matyášová; Zdeňka Vejnarová; Jaroslav Soukup; Ondřej Moravec	Belarus; Tatyana Shyntar; Natalya Sokolova; Alexandr Ustinov; Vitalii Pertzev
2007	(Estonia) Otepää	Russia; Evgenia Mikhaylova; Anna Sorokina; Alexey Katrenko; Ivan Bogdanov	Ukraine; Svetlana Krykonchuk; Lyudmyla Pysarenko; Oleg Berezhnoy; Olexander Bilanenko	Czech Republic; Pavla Matyášová; Zdeňka Vejnarová; Jaroslav Soukup; Ondřej Moravec

=== Total medals by country ===
Updated after the 2024 Championships.

Rank	Nation	Gold	Silver	Bronze	Total
1	Russia	40	34	27	101
2	Belarus	27	15	17	59
3	Ukraine	4	6	3	13
4	Italy	4	1	1	6
5	Slovakia	3	3	7	13
6	Czech Republic	3	2	5	10
7	Estonia	2	7	4	13
8	Latvia	1	4	1	6
9	Norway	1	2	1	4
10	China	1	0	1	2
11	Kazakhstan	0	3	3	6
12	Poland	0	2	6	8
13	Slovenia	0	2	1	3
13	Uzbekistan	0	2	1	3
15	Kyrgyzstan	0	1	0	1
16	Germany	0	0	2	2
17	Canada	0	0	1	1
17	Moldova	0	0	1	1
17	United States	0	0	1	1
Totals (19 entries)		86	84	83	253

== Roller skiing (since 2006) ==
=== Men ===
==== Super-Sprint (7.5 km) ====
From 2019 to 2022 the distance was 5 km

Year	Location	Gold	Silver	Bronze
2019	(Belarus) Minsk	Timofey Lapshin (KOR)	Klemen Bauer (SLO)	Eduard Latypov (RUS)
2021	(Czech Republic) Nové Město	George Buta (ROU)	Yaroslav Kostyukov (RBU)	Florent Claude (BEL)
2022	(Germany) Ruhpolding	Philipp Horn (GER)	Sebastian Samuelsson (SWE)	Peppe Femling (SWE)
2023	(Slovakia) Brezno/Osrblie	Andrejs Rastorgujevs (LAT)	Tomáš Mikyska (CZE)	Artem Tyshchenko (UKR)
2024	(Estonia) Otepää	Dmytro Pidruchnyi (UKR)	Artem Tyshchenko (UKR)	Tomáš Mikyska (CZE)

==== Sprint (7.5 km) ====
From 2006 to 2018 the distance was 10 km

Year	Location	Gold	Silver	Bronze
2006	(Russia) Ufa	Maxim Chudov (RUS)	Ondřej Moravec (CZE)	Danilo Kodela (SLO)
2007	(Estonia) Otepää	Mikhail Kochkin (RUS)	Maxim Chudov (RUS)	Roland Lessing (EST)
2008	(France) Haute Maurienne	Simon Fourcade (FRA)	Vincent Defrasne (FRA)	Kirill Shcherbakov (RUS)
2009	(Germany) Oberhof	Christoph Stephan (GER)	Michael Rösch (GER)	Christoph Knie (GER)
2010	(Poland) Duszniki-Zdrój	Dušan Šimočko (SVK)	Matej Kazár (SVK)	Andrejs Rastorgujevs (LAT)
2011	(Czech Republic) Nové Město	Dmitri Yaroshenko (RUS)	Olexander Bilanenko (UKR)	Vladimir Iliev (BUL)
2012	(Russia) Ufa	Maxim Chudov (RUS)	Alexey Volkov (RUS)	Anton Shipulin (RUS)
2013	(Italy) Forni Avoltri	Lukas Hofer (ITA)	Tomáš Hasilla (SVK)	Simon Kočevar (SLO)
2014	(Russia) Tyumen	Ondřej Moravec (CZE)	Michael Rösch (BEL)	Martin Otčenáš (SVK)
2015	(Romania) Cheile Grădiștei	Vladimir Iliev (BUL)	Artem Pryma (UKR)	Martin Otčenáš (SVK)
2016	(Estonia) Otepää	Martin Otčenáš (SVK)	Lukas Kristejn (CZE)	Sergey Klyachin (RUS)
2017	(Russia) Chaykovskiy	Vladimir Chepelin (BLR)	Alexey Volkov (RUS)	Tomas Hasilla (SVK)
2018	(Czech Republic) Nové Město	Michal Krčmář (CZE)	Ondřej Moravec (CZE)	Tomáš Krupčík (CZE)
2019	(Belarus) Minsk	Timofey Lapshin (KOR)	Alexander Povarnitsyn (RUS)	Eduard Latypov (RUS)
2021	(Czech Republic) Nové Město	Michal Krčmář (CZE)	Matej Baloga (SVK)	Cornel Puchianu (ROU)
2022	(Germany) Ruhpolding	Sebastian Samuelsson (SWE)	Peppe Femling (SWE)	Niklas Hartweg (CHE)
2023	(Slovakia) Brezno/Osrblie	Florent Claude (BEL)	Vytautas Strolia (LTU)	Jesper Nelin (SWE)
2024	(Estonia) Otepää	Jakub Stvrtecky (CZE)	Emilien Claude (FRA)	Thierry Langer (BEL)

==== Pursuit (10 km) ====
From 2006 to 2018 the distance was 12.5 km

Year	Location	Gold	Silver	Bronze
2006	(Russia) Ufa	Maxim Chudov (RUS)	Krzysztof Pływaczyk (POL)	Maksim Sokovnin (RUS)
2007	(Estonia) Otepää	Aleksander Grizman (RUS)	Maxim Chudov (RUS)	Mikhail Kochkin (RUS)
2008	(France) Haute Maurienne	Simon Fourcade (FRA)	Vincent Defrasne (FRA)	Matthias Simmen (SWI)
2009	(Germany) Oberhof	Michael Rösch (GER)	Christoph Stephan (GER)	Alexander Wolf (GER)
2010	(Poland) Duszniki-Zdrój	Matej Kazár (SVK)	Timofey Lapshin (RUS)	Andrejs Rastorgujevs (LAT)
2011	(Czech Republic) Nové Město	Dmitri Yaroshenko (RUS)	Olexander Bilanenko (UKR)	Krasimir Anev (BUL)
2012	(Russia) Ufa	Alexey Volkov (RUS)	Maxim Chudov (RUS)	Andrei Makoveev (RUS)
2013	(Italy) Forni Avoltri	Klemen Bauer (SLO)	Lukas Hofer (ITA)	Markus Windisch (ITA)
2014	(Russia) Tyumen	Michael Rösch (BEL)	Klemen Bauer (SLO)	Krasimir Anev (BUL)
2015	(Romania) Cheile Grădiștei	Martin Otčenáš (SVK)	Artem Pryma (UKR)	Matej Kazár (SVK)
2016	(Estonia) Otepää	Martin Otčenáš (SVK)	Sergey Klyachin (RUS)	Oleksander Zhyrnyi (UKR)
2017	(Russia) Chaykovskiy	Alexey Volkov (RUS)	Anton Shipulin (RUS)	Krasimir Anev (BUL)
2018	(Czech Republic) Nové Město	Ondřej Moravec (CZE)	Michal Krčmář (CZE)	Artem Pryma (UKR)
2019	(Belarus) Minsk	Martin Otčenáš (SVK)	Eduard Latypov (RUS)	Klemen Bauer (SLO)
2021	(Czech Republic) Nové Město	Michal Krčmář (CZE)	Florent Claude (BEL)	Yaroslav Kostyukov (RBU)

==== Mass Start (12,5 km) ====
Year	Location	Gold	Silver	Bronze
2022	(Germany) Ruhpolding	Sebastian Samuelsson (SWE)	Roman Rees (GER)	Martin Ponsiluoma (SWE)
2023	(Slovakia) Brezno/Osrblie	Taras Lesiuk (UKR)	Dmitrii Shamaev (ROU)	Vytautas Strolia (LTU)
2024	(Estonia) Otepää	Rene Zahkna (EST)	Jonáš Mareček (CZE)	Andrejs Rastorgujevs (LAT)

=== Women ===
==== Super-Sprint (7.5 km) ====
In 2019 the distance was 5 km

Year	Location	Gold	Silver	Bronze
2019	(Belarus) Minsk	Valentyna Semerenko (UKR)	Lucie Charvátová (CZE)	Ekaterina Glazyrina (RUS)
2021	(Czech Republic) Nové Město	Markéta Davidová (CZE)	Yuliia Dzhima (UKR)	Irina Kazakevich (RBU)
2022	(Germany) Ruhpolding	Dorothea Wierer (ITA)	Lisa Vittozzi (ITA)	Nastassia Kinnunen (FIN)
2023	(Slovakia) Brezno/Osrblie	Marion Wiesensarter (GER)	Tuuli Tomingas (EST)	Lisa Maria Spark (GER)
2024	(Estonia) Otepää	Paulína Bátovská Fialková (SVK)	Suvi Minkkinen (FIN)	Lucie Charvátová (CZE)

==== Sprint (6 km) ====
From 2006 to 2018 the distance was 7.5 km

Year	Location	Gold	Silver	Bronze
2006	(Russia) Ufa	Svetlana Tchernousova (RUS)	Marina Bortchoukova (RUS)	Lenka Faltusová (CZE)
2007	(Estonia) Otepää	Kaisa Mäkäräinen (FIN)	Lilia Efremova (UKR)	Tetiana Rud (UKR)
2008	(France) Haute Maurienne	Teja Gregorin (SLO)	Marie-Laure Brunet (FRA)	Maria Kossinova (RUS)
2009	(Germany) Oberhof	Magdalena Neuner (GER)	Maria Kossinova (RUS)	Natalia Levchenkova (MDA)
2010	(Poland) Duszniki-Zdrój	Krystyna Pałka (POL)	Agnieszka Cyl (POL)	Ľubomíra Kalinová (SVK)
2011	(Czech Republic) Nové Město	Valentyna Semerenko (UKR)	Krystyna Pałka (POL)	Jana Gereková (SVK)
2012	(Russia) Ufa	Olga Zaitseva (RUS)	Vita Semerenko (UKR)	Olga Vilukhina (RUS)
2013	(Italy) Forni Avoltri	Dorothea Wierer (ITA)	Jitka Landová (CZE)	Karin Oberhofer (ITA)
2014	(Russia) Tyumen	Teja Gregorin (SLO); Krystyna Guzik (POL)	—	Tang Jialin (CHN)
2015	(Romania) Cheile Grădiștei	Olga Abramova (UKR)	Monika Hojnisz (POL)	Magdalena Gwizdoń (POL)
2016	(Estonia) Otepää	Olena Pidhrushna (UKR)	Anna Frolina (KOR)	Iryna Varvynets (UKR)
2017	(Russia) Chaykovskiy	Svetlana Sleptsova (RUS)	Paulína Fialková (SVK)	Olga Dmitrieva (RUS)
2018	(Czech Republic) Nové Město	Paulína Fialková (SVK)	Monika Hojnisz (POL)	Galina Vishnevskaya (KAZ)
2019	(Belarus) Minsk	Ekaterina Glazyrina (RUS); Lucie Charvátová (CZE)	—	Darya Blashko (UKR)
2021	(Czech Republic) Nové Město	Monika Hojnisz (POL)	Markéta Davidová (CZE)	Polona Klemencic (SLO)
2022	(Germany) Ruhpolding	Lisa Vittozzi (ITA)	Markéta Davidová (CZE)	Lena Häcki (CHE); Paulina Fialkova (SVK)
2023	(Slovakia) Brezno/Osrblie	Tuuli Tomingas (EST)	Lisa Maria Spark (GER)	Tereza Vinklárková (CZE)
2024	(Estonia) Otepää	Tereza Voborníková (CZE)	Lotte Lie (BEL)	Paulína Bátovská Fialková (SVK)

==== Pursuit (10 km) ====
From 2006 to 2018 the distance was 10 km

Year	Location	Gold	Silver	Bronze
2006	(Russia) Ufa	Elena Davgul (RUS)	Svetlana Tchernousova (RUS)	Krystyna Pałka (POL)
2007	(Estonia) Otepää	Kaisa Mäkäräinen (FIN)	Tetiana Rud (UKR)	Yana Romanova (RUS)
2008	(France) Haute Maurienne	Teja Gregorin (SLO)	Marie-Laure Brunet (FRA)	Natalia Levchenkova (MDA)
2009	(Germany) Oberhof	Magdalena Neuner (GER)	Teja Gregorin (SLO)	Oksana Khvostenko (UKR)
2010	(Poland) Duszniki-Zdrój	Agnieszka Cyl (POL)	Krystyna Pałka (POL)	Magdalena Gwizdoń (POL)
2011	(Czech Republic) Nové Město	Krystyna Pałka (POL)	Valentyna Semerenko (UKR)	Weronika Nowakowska-Ziemniak (POL)
2012	(Russia) Ufa	Vita Semerenko (UKR)	Olga Zaitseva (RUS)	Olena Pidhrushna (UKR)
2013	(Italy) Forni Avoltri	Jitka Landová (CZE)	Anna Boulygina (RUS)	Victoria Padial (SPA)
2014	(Russia) Tyumen	Teja Gregorin (SLO)	Vita Semerenko (UKR)	Tang Jialin (CHN)
2015	(Romania) Cheile Grădiștei	Olga Abramova (UKR)	Monika Hojnisz (POL)	Juliya Dzhyma (UKR)
2016	(Estonia) Otepää	Kaisa Mäkäräinen (FIN)	Olena Pidhrushna (UKR)	Anna Frolina (KOR)
2017	(Russia) Chaykovskiy	Svetlana Sleptsova (RUS)	Nadiia Bielkina (UKR)	Paulina Fialkova (SVK)
2018	(Czech Republic) Nové Město	Veronika Vítková (CZE)	Paulína Fialková (SVK)	Galina Vishnevskaya (KAZ)
2019	(Belarus) Minsk	Zhang Yan (CHN)	Tamara Voronina (RUS)	Vita Semerenko (UKR)
2021	(Czech Republic) Nové Město	Markéta Davidová (CZE)	Yuliia Dzhima (UKR)	Tamara Derbusheva (RBU)

==== Mass Start (10 km) ====
Year	Location	Gold	Silver	Bronze
2022	(Germany) Ruhpolding	Dorothea Wierer (ITA)	Denise Herrmann (GER)	Markéta Davidová (CZE)
2023	(Slovakia) Brezno/Osrblie	Markéta Davidová (CZE)	Tuuli Tomingas (EST)	Marion Wiesensarter (GER)
2024	(Estonia) Otepää	Baiba Bendika (LAT)	Suvi Minkkinen (FIN)	Tereza Voborníková (CZE)

=== Mixed ===
==== Relay (2 × 6 km + 2 × 7.5 km) ====
Year	Location	Gold	Silver	Bronze
2008	(France) Haute Maurienne	France; Marie-Laure Brunet; Sandrine Bailly; Vincent Defrasne; Simon Fourcade	Slovenia; Teja Gregorin; Andreja Mali; Janez Marič; Vasja Rupnik	Italy; Michela Ponza; Katja Haller; Christian Martinelli; Markus Windisch
2009	(Germany) Oberhof	Germany; Magdalena Neuner; Tina Bachmann; Christoph Stephan; Michael Rösch	Russia; Anna Bogaliy-Titovets; Oksana Neupokoeva; Anton Shipulin; Victor Vasilyev	Slovakia; Jana Gereková; Anastasiya Kuzmina; Pavol Hurajt; Dušan Šimočko
2010	(Poland) Duszniki-Zdrój	Poland; Krystyna Pałka; Magdalena Gwizdoń; Tomasz Sikora; Mirosław Kobus	Russia; Maria Demidova; Evgeniya Sedova; Andrei Makoveev; Evgeniy Garanichev	Slovakia; Jana Gereková; Ľubomíra Kalinová; Matej Kazár; Dušan Šimočko
2011	(Czech Republic) Nové Město	Russia; Galina Nechkasova; Olga Abramova; Anton Shipulin; Dmitri Yaroshenko	Ukraine; Olena Pidhrushna; Valj Semerenko; Andriy Deryzemlya; Olexander Bilanenko	Slovakia; Anastasiya Kuzmina; Jana Gereková; Miroslav Matiaško; Pavol Hurajt
2012	(Russia) Ufa	Russia; Svetlana Sleptsova; Olga Zaitseva; Alexey Volkov; Anton Shipulin	Ukraine; Vita Semerenko; Valj Semerenko; Oleg Berezhnoy; Andriy Deryzemlya	Czech Republic; Jitka Landová; Lea Johanidesová; Tomáš Krupčík; Ondřej Exler
2013	(Italy) Forni Avoltri	Russia; Alexandra Alikina; Olga Shesterikova; Aleksandr Shreider; Andrei Prokunin	Italy; Alexia Runggaldier; Nicole Gontier; Benjamin Plaickner; Giuseppe Montello	Slovakia; Paulína Fialková; Terézia Poliaková; Matej Kazár; Miroslav Matiaško
2014	(Russia) Tyumen	Czech Republic; Veronika Vítková; Gabriela Soukalová; Ondřej Moravec; Michal Šlesingr	Ukraine; Iryna Varvynets; Valj Semerenko; Artem Pryma; Serhiy Semenov	Slovenia; Andreja Mali; Teja Gregorin; Klemen Bauer; Lenart Oblak
2015	(Romania) Cheile Grădiștei	Russia; Ekaterina Avvakumova; Olga Kalina; Sergey Klyachin; Sergey Korastylev	Bulgaria; Emilia Yordanova; Desislava Stoyanova; Anton Sinapov; Vladimir Iliev	Romania; Luminiţa Pişcoran; Réka Ferencz; Gheorghe Pop; Cornel Puchianu
2016	(Estonia) Otepää	Finland; Mari Laukkanen; Kaisa Mäkäräinen; Tuomas Grönman; Olli Hiidensalo	Ukraine; Yuliia Dzhima; Olena Pidhrushna; Sergey Semenov; Dmytro Pidruchnyi	Poland; Magdalena Gwizdon; Monika Hojnisz; Grzegorz Guzik; Mateusz Janik
2017	(Russia) Chaykovskiy	Russia; Uliana Kaisheva; Svetlana Sleptsova; Alexey Volkov; Anton Shipulin	Slovakia; Paulina Fialkova; Ivona Fialkova; Tomas Hasilla; Matej Kazar	Ukraine; Yuliya Zhuravok; Mariya Panfilova; Anton Myhda; Maksym Ivko
2018	(Czech Republic) Nové Město	Russia; Ekaterina Yurlova-Percht; Margarita Vasileva; Nikita Porshnev; Yuri Shopin	Czech Republic; Veronika Vítková; Markéta Davidová; Ondřej Moravec; Michal Krčmář	Poland; Kinga Zbylut; Monika Hojnisz; Grzegorz Guzik; Łukasz Szczurek

=== Total medals by country ===
Updated after the 2024 Championships.

Rank	Nation	Gold	Silver	Bronze	Total
1	Russia	21	18	13	52
2	Czech Republic	14	11	8	33
3	Ukraine	8	18	11	37
4	Slovakia	8	6	13	27
5	Germany	7	5	4	16
6	Poland	6	7	6	19
7	Slovenia	5	4	5	14
8	Italy	5	3	3	11
9	Finland	4	2	1	7
10	France	3	5	0	8
11	Belgium	2	3	2	7
12	Sweden	2	2	3	7
13	Estonia	2	2	1	5
14	South Korea	2	1	1	4
15	Latvia	2	0	3	5
16	Bulgaria	1	1	4	6
17	Romania	1	1	2	4
18	China	1	0	2	3
19	Belarus	1	0	0	1
20	Russian Biathlon Union	0	1	3	4
21	Lithuania	0	1	1	2
22	Switzerland	0	0	3	3
23	Kazakhstan	0	0	2	2
23	Moldova	0	0	2	2
25	Spain	0	0	1	1
Totals (25 entries)		95	91	94	280

== See also ==
- Biathlon World Championships
- World Para Nordic Skiing Championships
- Biathlon Junior World Championships
- Biathlon European Championships
- European Summer Biathlon Championships
