= 2014–15 Biathlon World Cup – Overall Men =

== 2013–14 Top 3 Standings ==
Medal	Athlete	Points
Gold:	(France) Martin Fourcade	928
Silver:	(Norway) Emil Hegle Svendsen	636
Bronze:	(Norway) Johannes Thingnes Bø	631

== Events summary ==
Event:	Winner:	Second:	Third:
Östersund 20 km Individual details	Emil Hegle Svendsen; Norway	Serhiy Semenov; Ukraine	Michal Šlesingr; Czech Republic
Östersund 10 km Sprint details	Martin Fourcade; France	Ondřej Moravec; Czech Republic	Jakov Fak; Slovenia
Östersund 12.5 km Pursuit details	Martin Fourcade; France	Anton Shipulin; Russia	Emil Hegle Svendsen; Norway
Hochfilzen 10 km Sprint details	Johannes Thingnes Bø; Norway	Simon Schempp; Germany	Andreas Birnbacher; Germany
Hochfilzen 10 km Pursuit details	Martin Fourcade; France	Simon Schempp; Germany	Jakov Fak; Slovenia
Pokljuka 10 km Sprint details	Anton Shipulin; Russia	Dominik Landertinger; Austria	Emil Hegle Svendsen; Norway
Pokljuka 12.5 km Pursuit details	Emil Hegle Svendsen; Norway	Anton Shipulin; Russia	Martin Fourcade; France
Pokljuka 15 km Mass Start details	Anton Shipulin; Russia	Martin Fourcade; France	Simon Eder; Austria
Oberhof 10 km Sprint details	Martin Fourcade; France	Ole Einar Bjørndalen; Norway	Timofey Lapshin; Russia
Oberhof 15 km Mass start details	Martin Fourcade; France	Anton Shipulin; Russia	Dmitry Malyshko; Russia
Ruhpolding 10 km Sprint details	Johannes Thingnes Bø; Norway	Simon Schempp; Germany	Arnd Peiffer; Germany
Ruhpolding 15 km Mass Start details	Simon Schempp; Germany	Quentin Fillon Maillet; France	Michal Šlesingr; Czech Republic
Antholz 10 km Sprint details	Simon Schempp; Germany	Evgeniy Garanichev; Russia	Jakov Fak; Slovenia
Antholz 12.5 km Pursuit details	Simon Schempp; Germany	Simon Eder; Austria	Evgeniy Garanichev; Russia
Nové Město 10 km Sprint details	Jakov Fak; Slovenia	Simon Schempp; Germany	Jean-Guillaume Béatrix; France
Nové Město 12.5 km Pursuit details	Jakov Fak; Slovenia	Simon Schempp; Germany	Martin Fourcade; France
Holmenkollen 20 km Individual details	Martin Fourcade; France	Evgeniy Garanichev; Russia	Serhiy Semenov; Ukraine
Holmenkollen 10 km Sprint details	Arnd Peiffer; Germany	Martin Fourcade; France	Anton Shipulin; Russia
World Championships 10 km Sprint details	Johannes Thingnes Bø; Norway	Nathan Smith; Canada	Tarjei Bø; Norway
World Championships 12.5 km Pursuit details	Erik Lesser; Germany	Anton Shipulin; Russia	Tarjei Bø; Norway
World Championships 20 km Individual details	Martin Fourcade; France	Emil Hegle Svendsen; Norway	Ondřej Moravec; Czech Republic
World Championships 15 km Mass Start details	Jakov Fak; Slovenia	Ondřej Moravec; Czech Republic	Tarjei Bø; Norway
Khanty-Mansiysk 10 km Sprint details	Martin Fourcade; France	Anton Shipulin; Russia	Benedikt Doll; Germany
Khanty-Mansiysk 12.5 km Pursuit details	Nathan Smith; Canada	Benedikt Doll; Germany	Anton Shipulin; Russia
Khanty-Mansiysk 15 km Mass start details	Jakov Fak; Slovenia	Anton Shipulin; Russia	Tarjei Bø; Norway

== Standings ==
#	Name	ÖST IN	ÖST SP	ÖST PU	HOC SP	HOC PU	POK SP	POK PU	POK MS	OBE SP	OBE MS	RUH SP	RUH MS	ANT SP	ANT PU	NOV SP	NOV PU	HOL IN	HOL SP	WCH SP	WCH PU	WCH IN	WCH MS	KHA SP	KHA PU	KHA MS	Total
1.	Martin Fourcade (FRA)	0	60	60	36	60	43	48	54	60	60	~~15~~	20	16	40	43	48	60	54	29	36	60	31	60	43	21	1042
2	Anton Shipulin (RUS)	0	38	54	30	40	60	54	60	0	54	43	38	36	28	38	27	36	48	23	54	25	36	54	48	54	978
3	Jakov Fak (SLO)	~~17~~	48	43	40	48	17	30	34	25	36	27	~~14~~	48	36	60	60	43	22	27	34	31	60	23	31	60	883
4	Simon Schempp (GER)	16	30	38	54	54	38	22	21	11	31	54	60	60	60	54	54	14	28	0	—	34	34	25	DNS	—	792
5	Johannes Thingnes Bø (NOR)	34	1	11	60	43	31	34	16	43	27	60	31	10	19	31	29	38	34	60	10	36	38	0	—	32	728
6	Ondřej Moravec (CZE)	29	54	21	31	32	23	40	36	16	28	28	29	31	30	0	2	0	36	32	32	48	54	3	0	20	655
7	Evgeniy Garanichev (RUS)	26	40	30	7	14	40	25	12	0	16	18	30	54	48	22	38	54	31	38	19	6	30	8	~~5~~	29	635
8	Michal Šlesingr (CZE)	48	43	22	0	DNS	21	4	4	28	40	31	48	0	DNS	40	30	34	17	36	43	27	40	26	32	16	630
9	Emil Hegle Svendsen (NOR)	60	36	48	32	27	48	60	24	—	8	29	43	13	24	0	18	DNS	—	5	22	54	26	28	DNF	8	613
10	Erik Lesser (GER)	43	29	18	12	23	~~8~~	18	~~2~~	15	29	16	16	22	38	28	34	32	27	40	60	23	24	15	16	28	606
11	Simon Fourcade (FRA)	32	17	7	11	15	0	21	—	22	25	19	24	23	34	18	28	25	9	43	31	43	32	34	30	43	586
12	Fredrik Lindström (SWE)	40	5	28	0	19	18	29	43	4	21	20	27	21	21	26	31	18	7	21	17	~~3~~	29	36	36	26	543
13	Arnd Peiffer (GER)	25	14	23	8	0	0	—	—	0	—	48	32	30	31	32	32	16	60	11	27	19	18	38	38	36	538
14	Ole Einar Bjørndalen (NOR)	38	34	31	1	DNS	—	—	—	54	24	26	40	32	43	6	6	—	—	22	40	38	43	32	14	—	524
15	Simon Eder (AUT)	0	31	17	16	25	30	0	48	29	30	11	34	34	54	15	9	10	10	0	29	21	22	0	6	40	521
16	Nathan Smith (CAN)	0	32	25	0	0	16	19	32	6	21	6	—	0	—	36	40	29	19	54	28	0	16	40	60	24	503
17	Benjamin Weger (SUI)	24	0	—	29	21	14	32	14	40	12	36	10	43	13	12	15	40	15	28	8	11	4	22	28	31	502
18	Daniel Böhm (GER)	18	27	8	26	29	28	13	25	5	—	32	18	11	29	30	24	26	11	—	—	30	—	30	40	34	494
19	Tarjei Bø (NOR)	12	26	27	38	38	36	24	38	—	—	—	—	0	16	0	0	—	—	48	48	16	48	0	30	48	493
20	Jean-Guillaume Béatrix (FRA)	14	21	32	3	3	27	36	40	0	DNF	17	36	24	25	48	25	6	20	2	0	0	—	29	21	38	467
21	Benedikt Doll (GER)	—	—	—	—	—	—	—	—	34	34	38	21	15	18	21	20	13	30	31	13	—	25	48	54	18	433
22	Dominik Landertinger (AUT)	36	11	40	43	34	54	43	28	—	—	0	—	—	—	29	7	0	32	2	26	13	14	—	—	—	412
23	Quentin Fillon Maillet (FRA)	31	0	15	0	26	34	3	29	25	18	4	54	12	20	20	22	27	38	3	0	0	—	0	DNS	27	408
24	Andreas Birnbacher (GER)	6	19	36	48	36	3	0	31	21	23	0	25	4	22	23	36	30	43	—	—	—	—	—	—	—	406
25	Vladimir Iliev (BUL)	11	0	4	22	30	24	15	6	27	22	24	2	27	9	5	17	24	14	34	38	14	12	7	8	2	396
26	Serhiy Semenov (UKR)	54	13	5	9	6	0	—	—	—	—	—	—	0	—	34	43	48	26	15	30	40	8	5	25	10	371
27	Andrejs Rastorgujevs (LAT)	DNS	28	13	17	24	0	0	—	38	38	40	4	20	6	—	—	19	0	0	16	0	—	43	34	30	370
28	Krasimir Anev (BUL)	27	3	19	24	18	9	10	23	32	43	34	8	0	DNS	0	19	0	0	0	0	22	—	21	9	12	333
29	Timofey Lapshin (RUS)	0	0	10	25	28	0	38	10	48	32	2	28	25	27	—	—	28	0	14	1	0	—	0	0	6	322
30	Lowell Bailey (USA)	21	18	24	24	9	25	12	18	7	4	0	6	9	10	—	—	0	0	24	5	17	28	0	19	—	280
#	Name	ÖST IN	ÖST SP	ÖST PU	HOC SP	HOC PU	POK SP	POK PU	POK MS	OBE SP	OBE MS	RUH SP	RUH MS	ANT SP	ANT PU	NOV SP	NOV PU	HOL IN	HOL SP	WCH SP	WCH PU	WCH IN	WCH MS	KHA SP	KHA PU	KHA MS	Total
31	Dmitry Malyshko (RUS)	0	20	0	34	31	12	7	30	18	48	3	12	26	0	—	—	3	6	7	0	—	—	1	20	—	278
32	Brendan Green (CAN)	0	0	—	0	0	7	8	—	—	—	25	23	40	23	19	11	0	2	20	25	20	20	11	18	—	272
33	Maxim Tsvetkov (RUS)	23	10	12	18	20	32	6	26	0	14	—	—	0	—	1	13	31	23	—	—	—	—	27	0	—	256
34	Tim Burke (USA)	30	24	6	28	16	15	20	8	0	—	0	—	0	1	3	4	0	0	26	21	10	27	0	0	—	239
35	Alexander Os (NOR)	—	25	34	15	8	0	14	—	14	—	30	26	17	7	—	—	0	3	—	—	—	—	—	—	—	193
36	Yuryi Liadov (BLR)	0	4	2	0	0	0	—	—	30	6	21	—	0	DNS	0	DNS	23	0	25	24	24	21	12	0	—	192
37	Daniel Mesotitsch (AUT)	0	9	16	27	22	10	11	—	17	—	0	—	0	12	—	—	0	24	0	15	0	—	0	17	—	180
38	Lukas Hofer (ITA)	0	7	9	0	—	26	31	20	—	—	0	—	7	11	—	—	0	1	17	11	0	—	0	27	—	167
39	Dominik Windisch (ITA)	28	0	0	0	0	29	23	22	8	—	7	—	2	5	—	—	5	0	18	6	0	—	0	0	—	153
40	Leif Nordgren (USA)	0	0	0	0	4	0	0	—	—	—	DNS	—	0	—	25	21	21	12	0	0	8	—	20	24	14	149
41	Jaroslav Soukup (CZE)	8	0	0	4	0	22	0	—	10	—	10	—	0	0	17	10	0	0	30	23	5	6	DNF	—	—	145
42	Vladimir Chepelin (BLR)	0	0	0	0	0	2	0	—	23	—	13	—	8	3	0	DNS	22	4	0	3	0	—	16	26	23	143
43	Dmytro Pidruchnyi (UKR)	0	0	—	5	10	0	5	—	—	—	—	—	28	32	27	DNS	—	29	0	0	—	—	—	—	—	136
43	Klemen Bauer (SLO)	19	15	29	0	5	0	—	—	26	—	0	—	DNS	—	17	0	0	0	0	2	18	—	4	1	—	136
45	Erlend Bjøntegaard (NOR)	—	—	—	—	—	19	27	27	19	—	22	—	—	—	14	3	2	DNS	—	—	—	—	2	DNS	—	135
46	Mario Dolder (SUI)	—	—	—	6	0	5	0	—	0	—	0	—	14	0	13	12	0	25	13	9	0	—	24	7	—	128
47	Julian Eberhard (AUT)	—	—	—	0	2	0	0	—	0	—	0	—	29	26	0	0	0	0	0	4	—	—	19	22	25	127
48	Roland Lessing (EST)	7	—	—	0	—	0	—	—	36	26	—	—	0	—	—	—	0	0	10	14	26	2	—	—	—	121
49	Henrik L'Abée-Lund (NOR)	—	—	—	—	—	—	—	—	—	—	23	22	38	DNS	0	1	11	0	6	12	—	—	0	0	—	113
50	Michael Rösch (BEL)	0	0	—	0	—	—	—	—	9	—	5	—	0	2	2	0	7	0	20	18	28	10	0	11	—	112
51	Michal Krčmář (CZE)	0	0	0	0	0	6	26	—	0	—	0	—	18	17	9	8	15	0	0	0	—	—	0	0	—	99
52	Christian De Lorenzi (ITA)	0	0	—	—	—	0	—	—	0	—	1	—	0	8	0	DNS	0	0	16	20	29	23	—	—	—	97
53	Artem Pryma (UKR)	—	22	3	14	12	0	—	—	—	—	—	—	19	15	0	0	4	0	0	—	7	—	0	0	—	96
54	Johannes Kühn (GER)	—	—	—	—	—	4	28	—	—	—	—	—	—	—	—	—	—	—	—	—	—	—	31	10	22	95
55	Matej Kazar (SVK)	0	16	0	21	17	0	9	—	3	—	0	—	7	0	0	0	—	—	8	0	0	—	13	0	—	94
56	Simon Desthieux (FRA)	2	0	0	10	1	13	16	—	0	—	9	—	0	DNS	7	26	0	8	—	—	0	—	—	—	—	92
57	Sven Grossegger (AUT)	0	0	0	—	—	0	17	—	0	—	—	—	0	14	4	23	0	13	—	—	12	—	6	2	—	91
58	Alexey Volkov (RUS)	—	—	—	—	—	—	—	—	1	—	0	—	—	—	—	—	9	—	—	—	32	—	17	12	—	71
59	Lars Helge Birkeland (NOR)	0	—	—	2	11	—	—	—	—	—	—	—	—	—	—	—	12	40	—	—	—	—	0	0	—	65
60	Artem Tyshchenko (UKR)	4	0	0	0	—	0	—	—	31	10	12	—	0	—	0	DNS	0	0	—	—	0	—	0	—	—	57
#	Name	ÖST IN	ÖST SP	ÖST PU	HOC SP	HOC PU	POK SP	POK PU	POK MS	OBE SP	OBE MS	RUH SP	RUH MS	ANT SP	ANT PU	NOV SP	NOV PU	HOL IN	HOL SP	WCH SP	WCH PU	WCH IN	WCH MS	KHA SP	KHA PU	KHA MS	Total
61	Aleksandr Pechenkin (RUS)	—	23	0	19	7	0	—	—	—	—	—	—	5	DNS	—	—	—	—	—	—	—	—	—	—	—	54
62	Antonin Guigonnat (FRA)	—	—	—	—	—	—	—	—	—	—	—	—	—	—	—	16	17	16	—	—	—	—	—	—	—	49
63	Cornel Puchianu (ROU)	13	6	0	13	0	0	0	—	0	—	0	—	0	0	0	0	—	0	9	7	0	—	0	—	—	48
64	Yan Savitskiy (KAZ)	0	0	14	20	13	0	0	—	0	—	—	—	0	0	0	—	DNS	—	0	—	0	—	0	—	—	47
65	Florian Graf (GER)	0	0	0	—	—	—	—	—	—	—	—	—	—	—	—	—	—	—	—	—	—	—	18	23	4	45
66	Tomáš Krupčík (CZE)	0	8	20	0	—	0	0	—	0	—	—	—	0	—	—	—	0	0	—	—	15	—	0	—	—	43
67	Thomas Bormolini (ITA)	22	0	0	0	—	—	—	—	20	—	0	—	0	—	—	—	0	0	0	—	0	—	0	—	—	42
68	Vetle Sjåstad Christiansen (NOR)	0	0	26	—	—	11	2	—	0	—	—	—	—	—	—	—	—	—	—	—	—	—	—	—	—	39
69	Matvey Eliseev (RUS)	—	—	—	—	—	—	—	—	—	—	0	—	—	—	24	14	—	—	—	—	—	—	0	—	—	38
70	Alexey Slepov (RUS)	—	—	—	—	—	—	—	—	—	—	—	—	—	—	—	5	—	18	—	—	—	—	0	13	—	36
71	Kalev Ermits (EST)	0	—	—	—	—	—	—	—	—	—	0	—	—	—	11	0	1	21	0	—	1	—	—	—	—	34
72	Serafin Wiestner (SUI)	—	—	—	0	—	0	0	—	13	—	0	—	0	—	0	—	—	0	12	0	0	—	9	0	—	34
73	Ivan Joller (SUI)	0	0	—	—	—	1	0	—	0	—	—	—	—	—	0	—	0	0	5	0	0	—	10	15	—	31
74	David Komatz (AUT)	5	12	1	0	—	0	—	—	—	—	—	—	3	4	—	—	0	0	—	—	—	—	0	—	—	25
75	Martin Otčenáš (SVK)	0	0	—	0	0	20	1	—	0	—	0	—	0	—	0	—	—	—	0	—	0	—	0	—	—	21
76	Peppe Femling (SWE)	—	0	0	0	—	0	—	—	0	—	—	—	—	—	0	—	20	0	0	—	0	—	0	DNS	—	20
77	Tobias Arwidson (SWE)	20	0	0	0	0	0	—	—	0	—	0	—	—	—	0	—	0	0	—	—	0	—	0	—	—	20
78	Oleksander Zhyrnyi (UKR)	—	0	0	0	0	0	—	—	0	—	9	—	0	0	—	—	8	—	0	0	—	—	0	3	—	20
79	Scott Gow (CAN)	—	—	—	—	—	—	—	—	—	—	14	—	0	—	—	—	0	5	0	0	0	—	—	—	—	19
80	Kauri Koiv (EST)	0	0	—	0	0	0	DNS	—	0	—	0	—	—	—	0	—	0	0	0	0	0	—	14	4	—	18
81	Jeremy Finello (SUI)	15	0	—	—	—	—	—	—	—	—	—	—	—	—	—	—	0	—	—	—	—	—	—	—	—	15
82	Christofer Eriksson (SWE)	0	0	—	0	—	0	—	—	12	—	0	—	—	—	—	—	—	—	0	—	—	—	DNS	—	—	12
83	Tobias Eberhard (AUT)	10	2	0	0	—	0	0	—	0	—	—	—	—	—	—	—	—	—	—	—	—	—	—	—	—	12
84	Ted Armgren (SWE)	—	—	—	—	—	—	—	—	—	—	—	—	—	—	8	0	0	0	0	—	4	—	—	—	—	12
85	Dmitri Dyuzhev (BLR)	—	—	—	—	—	—	—	—	—	—	—	—	—	—	10	0	0	0	0	0	—	—	0	—	—	10
86	Janez Maric (SLO)	—	—	—	—	—	0	—	—	0	—	0	—	—	—	0	—	—	—	0	—	9	—	—	—	—	9
87	Tsukasa Kobonoki (JPN)	9	0	—	0	—	0	—	—	—	—	0	—	—	—	—	—	0	0	0	—	0	—	—	—	—	9
88	Ahti Toivanen (FIN)	3	0	0	—	—	0	0	—	0	—	0	—	0	—	0	—	DNS	—	0	0	0	—	—	—	—	3
89	Miroslav Matiaško (SVK)	0	—	—	0	—	0	—	—	2	—	0	—	0	—	0	—	0	0	0	—	0	—	0	—	—	2
90	Lee-Steve Jackson (GBR)	0	0	—	0	—	0	—	—	—	—	—	—	—	—	—	—	—	0	0	—	2	—	—	—	—	2
91	Tomáš Hasilla (SVK)	1	0	0	0	—	0	—	—	0	—	0	—	1	0	0	—	0	0	0	—	—	—	—	—	—	2
