= Markus Windisch =

Italian biathlete

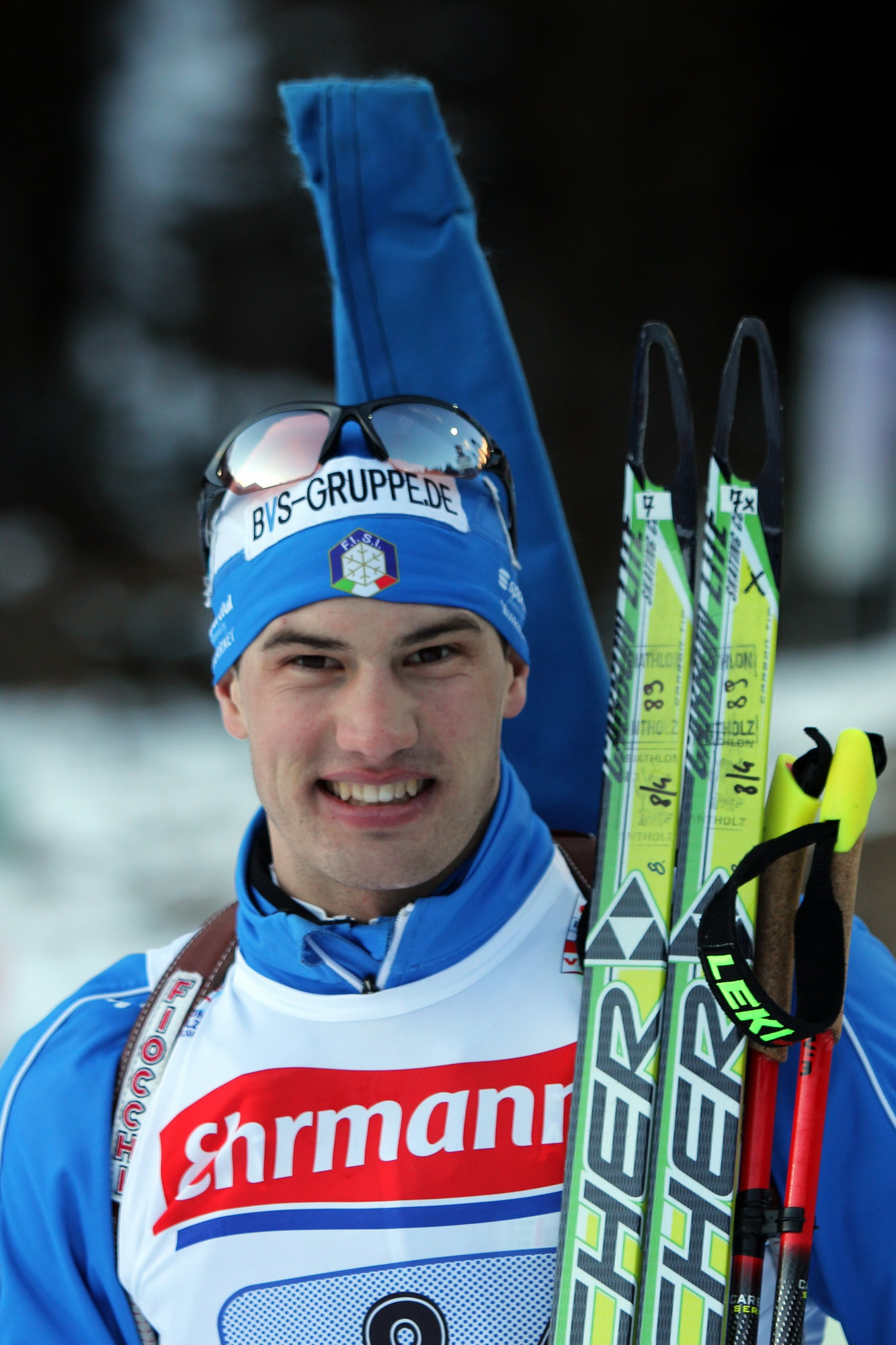
- Windisch in Antholz-Anterselva in 2011.

Personal information
- Full name: Markus Windisch
- Born: 12 May 1984 (age 42) Bruneck, Italy
- Height: 1.85 m (6 ft 1 in)

Sport

Professional information
- Sport: Biathlon
- Club: C.S. Esercito
- World Cup debut: 5 December 2004
- Retired: 8 July 2014

Olympic Games
- Teams: 2 (2010, 2014)
- Medals: 0

World Championships
- Teams: 6 (2006, 2007, 2008, 2009, 2011, 2012)
- Medals: 0

World Cup
- Seasons: 10 (2004/05–2013/14)
- Individual victories: 0
- All victories: 1
- Individual podiums: 0
- All podiums: 2
Medal record
Men's biathlon
Representing Italy
Summer World Championships
Bronze medal – third place	2008 Haute Maurienne	Mixed relay
Bronze medal – third place	2013 Forni Avoltri	12.5 km pursuit

Markus Windisch (born 12 May 1984) is a former Italian biathlete.

== Career ==
Windisch had three top-10 finishes in World Cup races, with his best World Cup overall finish was 26th in the 2008–09 Biathlon World Cup. He represented Italy at the 2010 Winter Olympics and 2014 Winter Olympics. His brother Dominik Windisch is also a biathlete.

He retired from the sport after the 2013–14 season.

== Biathlon results ==
All results are sourced from the International Biathlon Union.

=== Olympic Games ===
Event	Individual	Sprint	Pursuit	Mass start	Relay	Mixed relay
(Canada) 2010 Vancouver	31st	44th	53rd	—	12th	—N/a
(Russia) 2014 Sochi	71st	81st	—	—	5th	—

*The mixed relay was added as an event in 2014.

=== World Championships ===
Event	Individual	Sprint	Pursuit	Mass start	Relay	Mixed relay
(Slovenia) 2006 Pokljuka	—N/a	—N/a	—N/a	—N/a	—N/a	DNS
(Italy) 2007 Antholz-Anterselva	57th	47th	DNF	—	4th	—
(Sweden) 2008 Östersund	—	51st	55th	—	11th	—
(South Korea) 2009 Pyeongchang	12th	19th	23rd	16th	7th	7th
(Russia) 2011 Khanty-Mansiysk	83rd	18th	13th	28th	5th	—
(Germany) 2012 Ruhpolding	22nd	8th	30th	20th	4th	9th

*During Olympic seasons competitions are only held for those events not included in the Olympic program.

=== Junior/Youth World Championships ===
Event	Individual	Sprint	Pursuit	Relay
(Italy) 2002 Ridnaun-Val Ridanna	11th	5th	8th	7th
(Poland) 2003 Kościelisko	14th	11th	4th	10th
(France) 2004 Haute Maurienne	30th	19th	29th	8th
(Finland) 2005 Kontiolahti	19th	44th	24th	—

Further notable results

- 2007: 2nd, Italian championships of biathlon, mass start
- 2008: 2nd, Italian championships of biathlon, mass start
- 2009:
  - 1st, Italian championships of biathlon, sprint
  - 2nd, Italian championships of biathlon, pursuit
- 2010:
  - 2nd, Italian championships of biathlon, sprint
  - 2nd, Italian championships of biathlon, pursuit
- 2011: 3rd, Italian championships of biathlon, sprint
