= David Ekholm =

Swedish biathlete (born 1979)

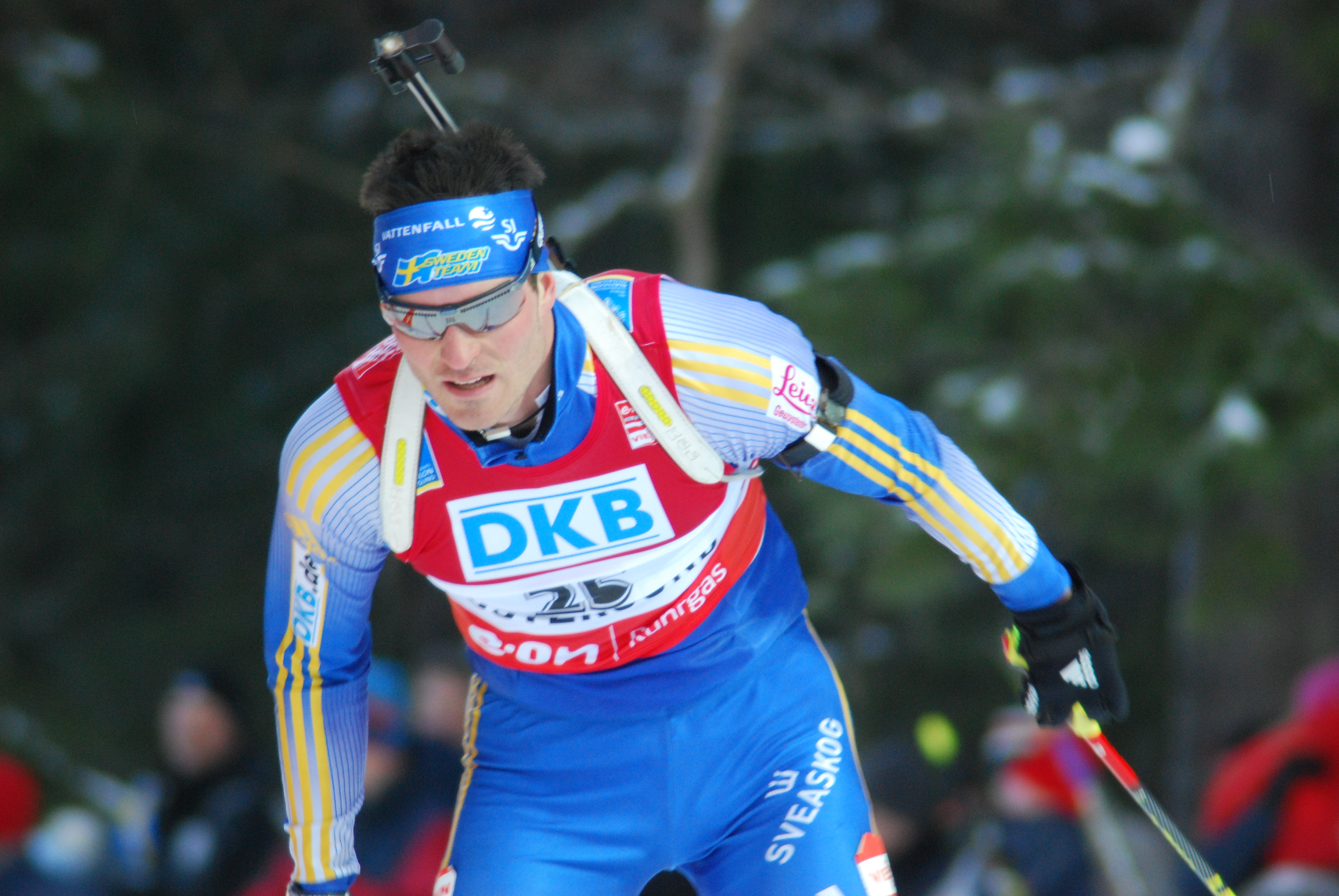
- David Ekholm during the IBU World Championships in Östersund, Sweden in February 2008

Personal information
- Nationality: Swedish
- Born: 16 January 1979 (age 47) Ekshärad, Sweden

Sport
- Sport: Biathlon
Medal record
Men's biathlon
Representing Sweden
Junior World Championships
Gold medal – first place	1999 Pokljuka	4 × 7.5 km relay

David Ekholm (born 16 January 1979) is a Swedish biathlete. He competed in three events at the 2006 Winter Olympics.

He married fellow former biathlete Helena Ekholm.
