= Dušan Šimočko =

Slovak biathlete (born 1983)

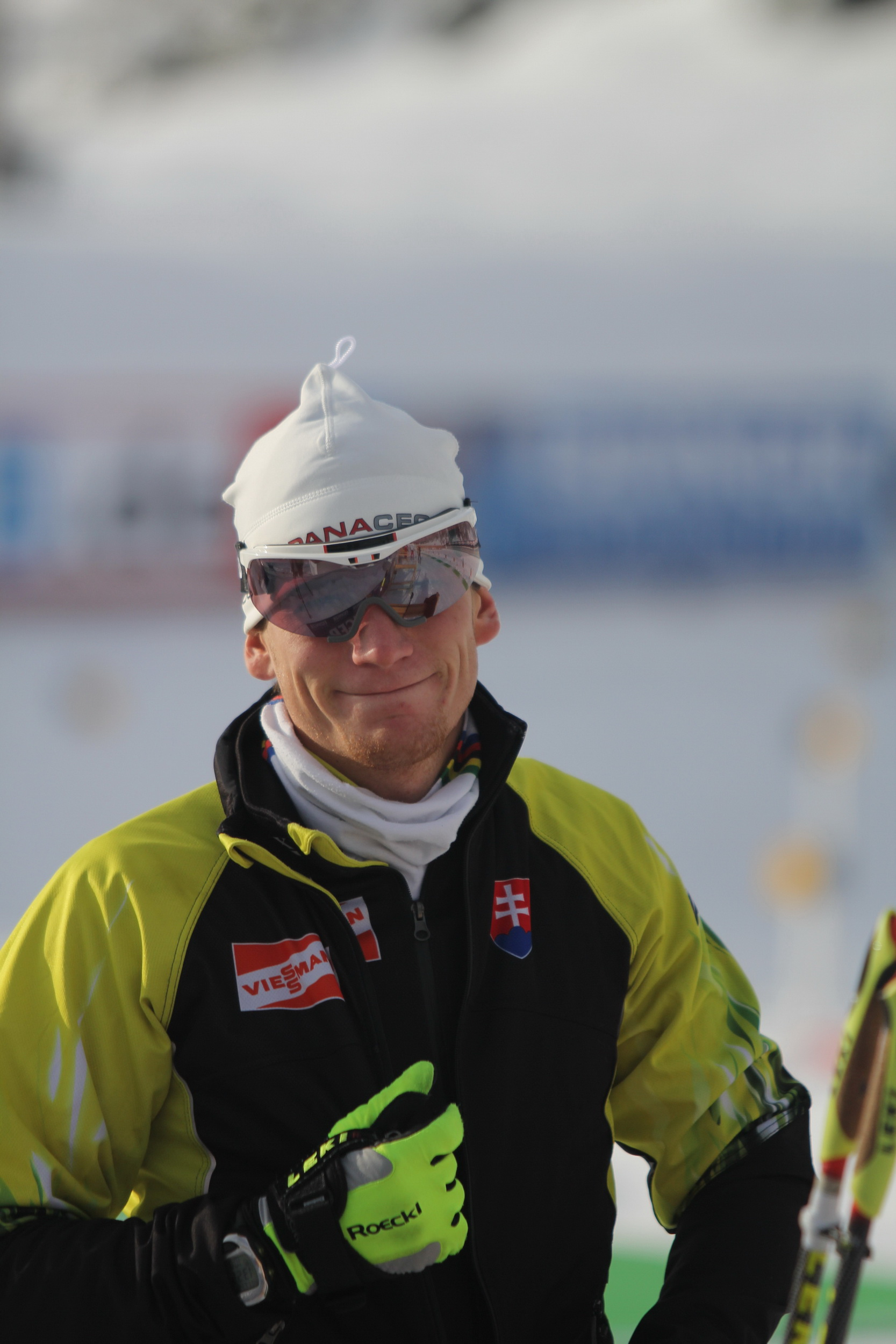
- Šimočko in 2011

Personal information
- Full name: Dušan Šimočko
- Born: 29 September 1983 (age 42) Banská Bystrica, Czechoslovakia
- Height: 1.74 m (5 ft 9 in)
- Website: simocko.eu

Sport

Professional information
- Sport: Biathlon
- Club: VŠC Dukla Banská Bystrica
- World Cup debut: 7 December 2002

Olympic Games
- Teams: 2 (2006, 2010)
- Medals: 0

World Championships
- Teams: 8 (2005, 2006, 2007, 2009, 2010, 2011, 2012, 2013)
- Medals: 0

World Cup
- Seasons: 11 (2002/03, 2004/05–2013/14)
- All podiums: 0
Medal record
Men's biathlon
Representing Slovakia
Summer World Championships
Gold medal – first place	2010 Duszniki-Zdrój	10 km sprint
Bronze medal – third place	2009 Oberhof	Mixed relay
Bronze medal – third place	2010 Duszniki-Zdrój	Mixed relay
Junior European Championships
Silver medal – second place	2000 Zakopane	4 × 7.5 km relay
Silver medal – second place	2002 Kontiolahti	12.5 km pursuit
Bronze medal – third place	2002 Kontiolahti	10 km sprint
Summer Junior World Championships
Silver medal – second place	2003 Forni Avoltri	3 × 4 km relay
Silver medal – second place	2004 Brezno-Osrblie	4 km sprint
European Youth Olympic Winter Festival
Gold medal – first place	1999 Poprad-Tatry	Mixed 4 x 5 km relay
- Updated on 22 March 2015

Dušan Šimočko (born 29 September 1983) is a Slovak biathlete.

== Life and career ==
He has represented Slovakia at 2006 and 2010 Winter Olympics, achieving 18th place at Men's 20 kilometres event at 2010 Olympics. He debuted in the Biathlon World Cup in 2002–03 season in Östersund. His best World Cup overall finish was 63rd in the 2009–10 season.

== Biathlon results ==
All results are sourced from the International Biathlon Union.

=== Olympic Games ===
Event	Individual	Sprint	Pursuit	Mass start	Relay
(Italy) 2006 Turin	56th	—	—	—	14th
(Canada) 2010 Vancouver	18th	75th	—	—	15th

=== World Championships ===
Event	Individual	Sprint	Pursuit	Mass start	Relay	Mixed relay
(Austria) 2005 Hochfilzen	—	77th	—	—	—	—
(Slovenia) 2006 Pokljuka	—N/a	—N/a	—N/a	—N/a	—N/a	13th
(Italy) 2007 Antholz-Anterselva	73rd	73rd	—	—	15th	—
(South Korea) 2009 Pyeongchang	42nd	61st	—	—	12th	10th
(Russia) 2010 Khanty-Mansiysk	—N/a	—N/a	—N/a	—N/a	—N/a	14th
(Russia) 2011 Khanty-Mansiysk	32nd	88th	—	—	18th	—
(Germany) 2012 Ruhpolding	70th	15th	35th	—	12th	7th
(Czech Republic) 2013 Nové Město	93rd	—	—	—	10th	—

*During Olympic seasons competitions are only held for those events not included in the Olympic program.

=== Junior World Championships ===
Event	Individual	Sprint	Pursuit	Relay
(Austria) 2000 Hochfilzen	35th	30th	37th	8th
(Russia) 2001 Khanty-Mansiysk	21st	6th	9th	6th
(Italy) 2002 Ridnaun-Val Ridanna	14th	22nd	7th	4th
(Poland) 2003 Kościelisko	60th	5th	6th	6th
(France) 2004 Haute Maurienne	5th	16th	16th	11th
