= Biathlon Junior World Championships 1999 =

Biathlon event in Slovenia

The 1999 Biathlon Junior World Championships was held in Pokljuka, Slovenia from February 17 to February 21, 1999. There was to be a total of 8 competitions: sprint, pursuit, individual, and relay races for men and women.

== Medal winners ==
=== Junior Women ===
Event:	Gold:	Time	Silver:	Time	Bronze:	Time
12.5 km individual details	Sabine Flatscher; Germany	43:58.6 (1+0+0+0)	Simone Denkinger; Germany	44:23.8 (0+0+0+0)	Linda Tjørhom; Norway	45:28.7 (0+0+2+0)
7.5 km sprint details	Martina Glagow; Germany	24:13.5 (0+0)	Linda Tjørhom; Norway	24:54.6 (0+0)	Magdalena Grzywa; Poland	24:55.6 (0+1)
10 km pursuit details	Martina Glagow; Germany	34:56.4 (1+0+0+2)	Linda Tjørhom; Norway	36:22.2 (0+1+2+1)	Michela Ponza; Italy	36:23.4 (0+0+2+1)
3 × 7.5 km relay details	Germany; Simone Denkinger; Sabine Flatscher; Martina Glagow	1:14:53.4 (0+1) (0+3) (0+2) (0+0) (0+0) (0+2)	Russia; Anastasiya Ochagova; Ekaterina Utochkina; Anna Bogaliy-Titovets	1:16:38.3 (0+1) (0+2) (0+0) (0+0) (0+1) (0+2)	Poland; Magdalena Grzywa; Magdalena Gwizdoń; Adrianna Babik	1:17:03.7 (0+0) (0+1) (0+0) (0+3) (0+0) (2+3)

=== Junior Men ===
Event:	Gold:	Time	Silver:	Time	Bronze:	Time
15 km individual details	Syver Berg-Domaas; Norway	43:09.4 (0+0+0+1)	Mika Kaljunen; Finland	43:49.9 (0+0+0+1)	Fabian Mund; Germany	44:16.3 (0+0+0+1)
10 km sprint details	Syver Berg-Domaas; Norway	25:55.0 (0+0)	Viktor Gain; Russia	26:51.7 (0+1)	Mikhail Kochkin; Russia	26:58.7 (1+2)
12.5 km pursuit details	Syver Berg-Domaas; Norway	37:36.7 (0+1+1+0)	Mikhail Kochkin; Russia	38:15.0 (1+0+2+0)	Per Eriksson; Sweden	38:42.1 (1+0+1+1)
4 × 7.5 km relay details	Sweden; David Ekholm; Per Eriksson; Mikael Hagström; Sven Johansson	1:29:50.0 (0+0) (0+2) (0+0) (0+0) (0+1) (0+2) (0+1) (0+1)	Norway; Jon Kristian Svaland; Geir Ole Steinslett; Stian Eckhoff; Syver Berg-Domaas	1:29:54.7 (0+2) (1+3) (0+3) (0+2) (0+0) (0+1) (0+0) (1+3)	Germany; Fabian Mund; Andreas Stadler; Tillmann Helk; Daniel Graf	1:30:24.4 (0+0) (0+3) (0+3) (0+1) (0+1) (0+0) (0+1) (0+1)

== Medal table ==
* Host nation (Slovenia)

Rank	Nation	Gold	Silver	Bronze	Total
1	Germany (GER)	4	1	2	7
2	Norway (NOR)	3	3	1	7
3	Sweden (SWE)	1	0	1	2
4	Russia (RUS)	0	3	1	4
5	Finland (FIN)	0	1	0	1
6	Poland (POL)	0	0	2	2
7	Italy (ITA)	0	0	1	1
Totals (7 entries)		8	8	8	24
