= Summer Biathlon World Championships 2021 =

2021 World Championships
- Location: Nové Město, Czech Republic
- Dates: 26 to 29 August 2021

The 2021 Summer Biathlon World Championships will be held from 26 to 29 August 2021 in Nové Město, Czech Republic.

== Medal summary ==
=== Medal table ===
* Host nation (Czech Republic)

Rank	Nation	Gold	Silver	Bronze	Total
1	Czech Republic*	4	1	0	5
2	Romania	1	0	1	2
3	Poland	1	0	0	1
4	Ukraine	0	2	0	2
5	RBU	0	1	3	4
6	Belgium	0	1	1	2
7	Slovakia	0	1	0	1
8	Slovenia	0	0	1	1
Totals (8 entries)		6	6	6	18

=== Men ===
Event	Gold		Silver		Bronze	
7.5 km super sprint	George Buta; Romania	19:36.5 (0+0+0+0)	Yaroslav Kostyukov; RBU	19:47.5 (0+1+1+0)	Florent Claude; Belgium	19:52.2 (0+1+0+1)
7.5 km sprint	Michal Krčmář; Czech Republic	19:18.5 (0+0)	Matej Baloga; Slovakia	19:28.7 (0+0)	Cornel Puchianu; Romania	19:41.6 (2+0)
10 km pursuit	Michal Krčmář; Czech Republic	27:01.5 (0+0+0+0)	Florent Claude; Belgium	27:17.2 (2+0+1+1)	Yaroslav Kostyukov; RBU	27:17.4 (1+0+0+0)

=== Women ===
Event	Gold		Silver		Bronze	
7.5 km super sprint	Markéta Davidová; Czech Republic	22:43.5 (1+0+1+1)	Yuliia Dzhima; Ukraine	22:46.4 (0+0+1+1)	Irina Kazakevich; RBU	22:50.1 (0+0+2+3)
6 km sprint	Monika Hojnisz; Poland	16:56.4 (1+0)	Markéta Davidová; Czech Republic	17:07.5 (0+0)	Polona Klemenčič; Slovenia	17:17.4 (0+0)
7.5 km pursuit	Markéta Davidová; Czech Republic	20:57.3 (2+1+0+0)	Yuliia Dzhima; Ukraine	20:58.1 (0+1+0+0)	Tamara Derbusheva; RBU	21:02.7 (1+0+0+0)
