= Natalia Levchenkova =

Moldovan biathlete (born 1977)

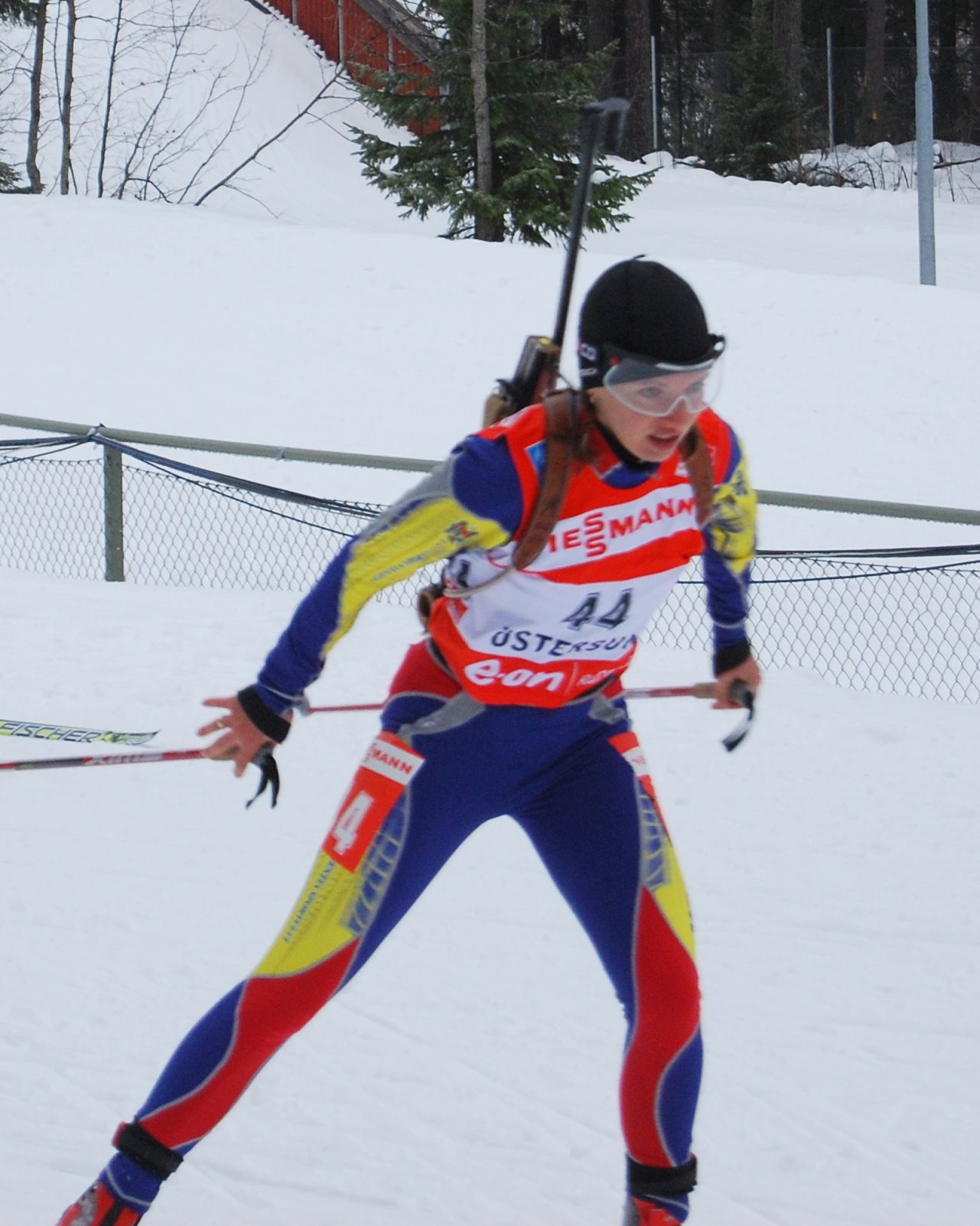

Personal information
- Born: 30 July 1977 (age 48) Smolensk, Smolensk Oblast, Soviet Union
- Height: 160 cm (63 in)

Sport
- Sport: Skiing
Medal record
Representing Moldova
European Championships
Gold medal – first place	2008 Nove Mesto	15 km individual
IBU Cup
Silver medal – second place	2008-09 Idre	7.5 km sprint
Representing Russia
Summer World Championships
Gold medal – first place	1999 Minsk	4 x 3 km relay
Silver medal – second place	1999 Minsk	4 km sprint
Bronze medal – third place	1999 Minsk	6 km pursuit
Bronze medal – third place	2008 Haute Maurienne	10 km pursuit
Bronze medal – third place	2009 Oberhof	7.5 km sprint
Junior World Championships
Bronze medal – third place	1997 Forni Avoltri	12.5 km individual
Bronze medal – third place	1997 Forni Avoltri	3 × 7.5 km relay

Natalia Levchenkova (Russian: Наталья Викторовна Левченкова, Romanian: Natalia Levcencova; born in Smolensk on 30 July 1977) is a Moldovan athlete who competes in biathlon. She was born in Soviet Union, and represented Russia early in her career. She competed in the 2006 and 2010 Winter Olympics for Moldova. She also served as the flag bearer for Moldova during the opening and closing ceremonies during the 2006 Winter Olympics. Her best performance was eighth in the individual event at the 2006 Winter Games. She has also won a gold in the Biathlon European Championships in 2008, a silver in the IBU Cup event in 2008, and five medals including a gold and a silver in the Summer Biathlon World Championships.

== Early life ==
Natalia Viktorovna Levchenkova was born on 30 July 1977 in Smolensk, Smolensk Oblast, Soviet Union.

== Career ==
Levchenkova started competing in biathlon events for Russia in the Biathlon Junior World Championships in 1997. In the Biathlon Junior World Championships 1997, she won two bronze medals in the 12.5 km individual and 7.5 km relay events. In the 1999 Summer Biathlon World Championships held in Minsk, she won three medals including a gold in the relay event, and a silver and bronze in the individual events. She made her debut at the Biathlon World Cup in 2003.

In 2006, Levchenkova was named to the Moldovan team for the 2006 Winter Olympics. She competed in four individual events in biathlon. She also served as the flag bearer for Moldova during the opening and closing ceremonies. She achieved her best performance in the women's individual event. She completed the course in just over 43 minutes and one second, and finished about two and half minutes behind the gold medal winner Svetlana Ishmuratova. In the 2006 Games, she also finished 21st in the mass start, 41st in the sprint and 23rd in the pursuit.

In February 2008, Levchenkova won her first and only gold medal in the 15 km individual event at the Biathlon European Championships event held at Nove Mesto in Czech Republic. She finished almost a minute ahead of the silver medalist Kjersti Isaksen. In November of the same year, she won a silver medal in the IBU Cup event held in Idre in Sweden. In the 7.5 km sprint race, she finished almost 22 seconds behind the winner Eva Tofalvi in second place.

Levchenkova won a bronze medal in each of the Summer Biathlon World Championships in 2008 and 2009. In 2010, Levchenkova was named to the Moldovan team for the second consecutive Olympics. She competed in three individual events in biathlon at the Olympics. She also finished 53rd in the sprint, 56th in the pursuit and 37th in the individual.
