= Biathlon Junior World Championships 1997 =

Biathlon event in Italy

The 1997 Biathlon Junior World Championships was held in Forni Avoltri, Italy from February 15 to February 23, 1997. There was to be a total of 8 competitions: sprint, individual, team and relay races for men and women.

== Medal winners ==
=== Junior Women ===
Event:	Gold:	Time	Silver:	Time	Bronze:	Time
12.5 km individual details	Tetiana Rud; Ukraine	38:07.2 (0+0+2)	Marcela Pavkovčeková; Slovakia	38:12.9 (0+0+0)	Natalia Levchenkova; Russia	38:19.8 (0+0+1)
7.5 km sprint details	Andrea Henkel; Germany	26:30.9 (0+0)	Martina Glagow; Germany	27:23.5 (2+0)	Olga Nazarova; Russia	27:36.0 (0+0)
3 × 7.5 km relay details	Norway; Ann Helen Grande; Linda Tjørhom; Gro Marit Istad	1:25:34.2	Germany; Andrea Henkel; Martina Glagow; Janet Klein	1:25:55.3	Russia; Ekaterina Ivanova; Olga Nazarova; Natalia Levchenkova	1:26:56.9
7.5 km team	Russia; Olga Zaitseva; Lilia Efremova; Ekaterina Ivanova; Olga Nazarova		Czech Republic; Irena Mádlová; Irena Tomšová; Denisa Pelikánová; Jitka Šimůnková		Germany; Janet Klein; Annet Meisner; Martina Glagow; Andrea Henkel	

=== Junior Men ===
Event:	Gold:	Time	Silver:	Time	Bronze:	Time
15 km individual details	Erik Lundström; Sweden	42:21.9 (0+0+0)	Sergei Ushankov; Russia	42:33.0 (1+0+0)	Karsten Kapinos; Germany	42:35.0 (0+0+0)
10 km sprint details	Jay Hakkinen; United States	27:32. (0+1)	Torsten Thrän; Germany	27:51.3 (0+1)	Marek Matiaško; Slovakia	28:19.6 (0+1)
4 × 7.5 km relay details	Germany; Karsten Kapinos; Torsten Thrän; Alexander Wolf; Jörn Wollschlaeger	1:32:09.1	Italy; Theo Senoner; Alexander Inderst; Paolo Longo; Flavien Jordaney	1:32:41.9	Russia; Vladimir Grigorev; Mikhail Kovalkov; Sergei Ushankov; Sergey Bashkirov	1:33:56.6
10 km team	Russia; Sergey Bashkirov; Dimitri Babich; Oleksiy Korobeinikov; Sergei Ushankov		Finland; Harri Lahdesmaki; Pasi Ahola; Joni Tiihonen; Jussi Mäkelä		Germany; Norman Köhler; Jörn Wollschlaeger; Torsten Thrän; Karsten Kapinos	

== Medal table ==
* Host nation (Italy)

Rank	Nation	Gold	Silver	Bronze	Total
1	Germany (GER)	2	3	3	8
2	Russia (RUS)	2	1	4	7
3	Norway (NOR)	1	0	0	1
3	Sweden (SWE)	1	0	0	1
3	Ukraine (UKR)	1	0	0	1
3	United States (USA)	1	0	0	1
7	Slovakia (SVK)	0	1	1	2
8	Czech Republic (CZE)	0	1	0	1
8	Finland (FIN)	0	1	0	1
8	Italy (ITA)*	0	1	0	1
Totals (10 entries)		8	8	8	24
