= George Buta =

Romanian biathlete (born 1993)

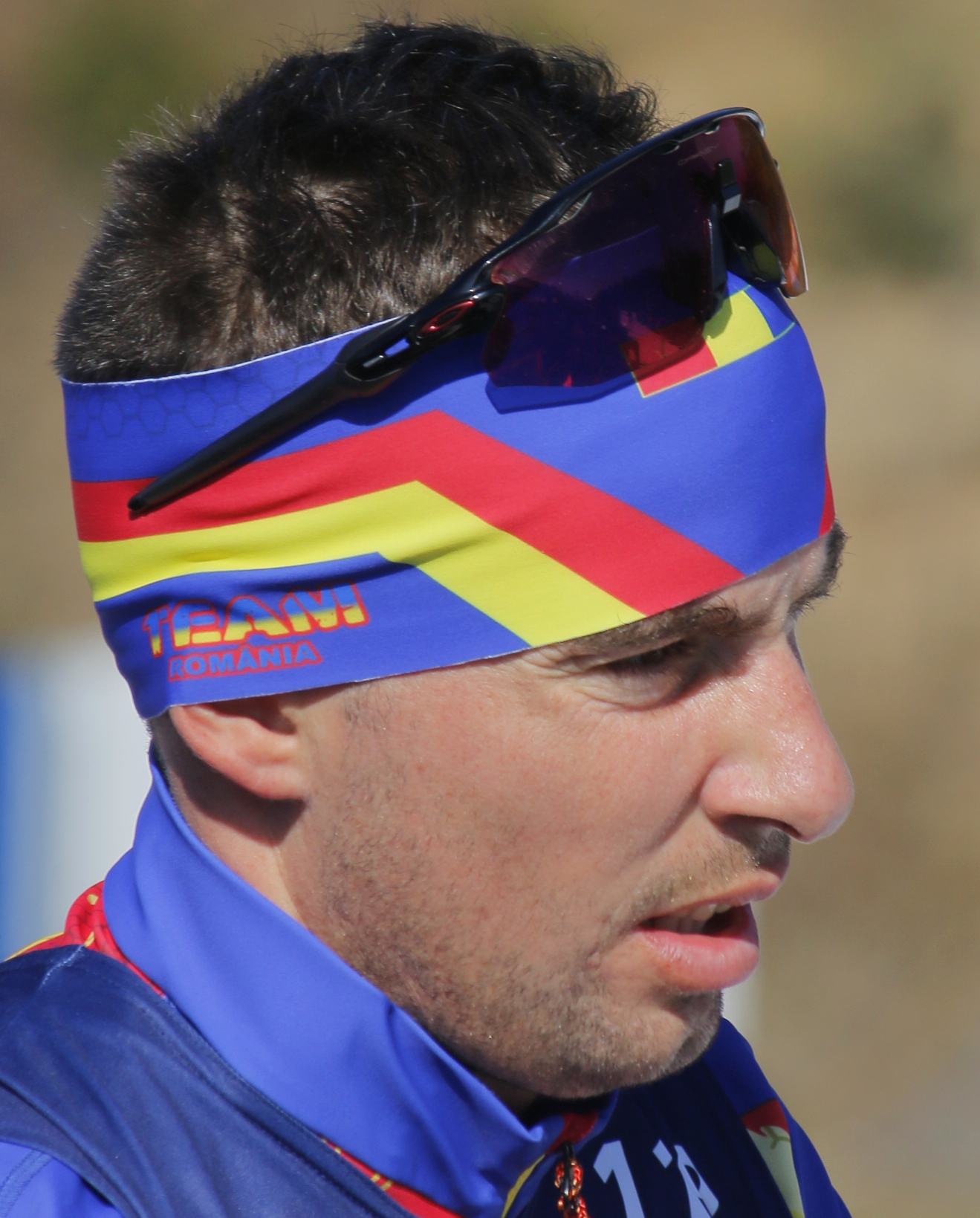
- Buta in 2023

Personal information
- Full name: George Răzvan Buta
- Born: 4 May 1993 (age 33) Brașov, Romania

Sport
- Sport: Biathlon

George Răzvan Buta (born 4 May 1993) is a Romanian biathlete. He competed in the 2018 Winter Olympics. He won the gold medal in super-sprint at the Summer Biathlon World Championships 2021.

== Biathlon results ==
All results are sourced from the International Biathlon Union.

=== Olympic Games ===
0 medals

Event	Individual	Sprint	Pursuit	Mass start	Relay	Mixed relay
(South Korea) 2018 Pyeongchang	37th	—	—	—	14th	—
(Italy) 2026 Milano Cortina	39th	68th	—	—	20th	—

=== World Championships ===
0 medals

Event	Individual	Sprint	Pursuit	Mass start	Relay	Mixed relay	Single Mixed relay
(Finland) 2015 Kontiolahti	55th	61rd	—	—	22nd	20th	—N/a
(Norway) 2016 Oslo Holmenkollen	57th	70th	—	—	18th	22nd	—N/a
(Austria) 2017 Hochfilzen	—	74th	—	—	17th	—	—N/a
(Sweden) 2019 Östersund	81st	53rd	52nd	—	22nd	26th	—
(Italy) 2020 Antholz-Anterselva	32nd	53rd	53rd	—	23rd	26th	—
(Slovenia) 2021 Pokljuka	35th	59th	38th	—	14th	25th	20th
(Germany) 2023 Oberhof	23rd	38th	33rd	—	8th	20th	23rd
(Czech Republic) 2024 Nové Město na Moravě	67th	71st	—	—	15th	23rd	—
(Switzerland) 2025 Lenzerheide	53rd	72nd	—	—	22nd	—	—

*During Olympic seasons competitions are only held for those events not included in the Olympic program.
**The single mixed relay was added as an event in 2019.
