= Miroslav Matiaško =

Slovak biathlete (born 1982)

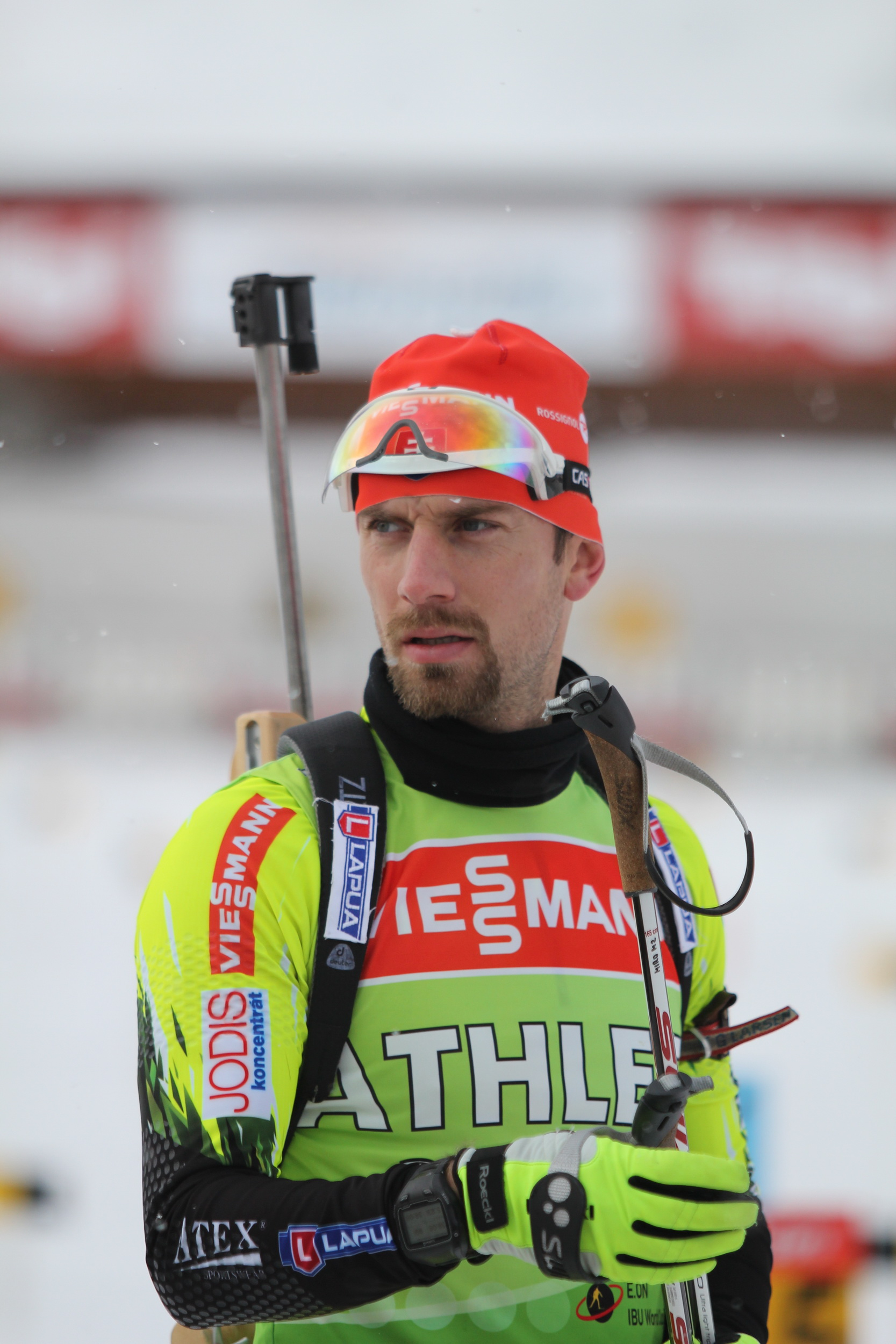
- Matiaško in 2012

Personal information
- Full name: Miroslav Matiaško
- Born: 14 July 1982 (age 44) Handlová, Czechoslovakia
- Height: 1.82 m (6 ft 0 in)

Sport

Professional information
- Sport: Biathlon
- Club: VŠC Dukla Banská Bystrica
- World Cup debut: 20 December 2002

Olympic Games
- Teams: 3 (2006, 2010, 2014)
- Medals: 0

World Championships
- Teams: 12 (2003, 2004, 2005, 2006, 2007, 2008, 2009, 2011, 2012, 2013, 2015, 2016)
- Medals: 0

World Cup
- Seasons: 14 (2002/03–2015/16)
- Individual victories: 0
- All victories: 0
- Individual podiums: 0
- All podiums: 1
Medal record
Men's biathlon
Representing Slovakia
Summer World Championships
Bronze medal – third place	2004 Brezno-Osrblie	4 × 4 km relay
Bronze medal – third place	2009 Oberhof	4 km sprint
Bronze medal – third place	2011 Nové Město	Mixed relay
Bronze medal – third place	2013 Forni Avoltri	Mixed relay
Summer European Championships
Bronze medal – third place	2010 Brezno-Osrblie	Mixed relay
Bronze medal – third place	2012 Brezno-Osrblie	Mixed relay
Winter Universiade
Bronze medal – third place	1999 Poprad-Tatry	20 km individual
Bronze medal – third place	2005 Innsbruck	4 x 7,5 km relay
Junior World Championships
Silver medal – second place	2003 Kościelisko	15 km individual
Junior European Championships
Silver medal – second place	2003 Forni Avoltri	10 km sprint
Junior Summer World Championships
Gold medal – first place	2003 Forni Avoltri	6 km mass start
Silver medal – second place	2003 Forni Avoltri	3 × 4 km relay
Bronze medal – third place	2003 Forni Avoltri	6 km pursuit

Miroslav Matiaško (born 14 July 1982) is a former Slovak biathlete.

== Career ==
Matiaško debuted in the Biathlon World Cup in the relay in Brezno-Osrblie on 20 December 2002, and his first individual race was on 18 January 2003 in the 10 km sprint event in Ruhpolding. As of January 2015, he has earned one World Cup podium, in the mixed relay event at Kontiolahti in the 2011–12 season. His best individual performance is a 6th-place finish in the individual at the 2010–11 Pokljuka event.

His best overall finish in the World Cup was in 2010–11, placing 73rd. His best performance at a World Championships is 9th, in the 2008 relay. As an individual, his best performance is 32nd, in the 20 km individual in 2013. He also won a silver medal at the 2003 Junior World Championships, in the individual.

He competed in the 2006, 2010 and 2010 Winter Olympics for Slovakia. As of January 2015, his best finish was 12th, as a member of the Slovak relay team in 2014. His best individual performance was 38th, in the 2006 individual.

Matiaško retired from biathlon after the end of the 2015–16 season.

== World Cup podiums ==
Season	Location	Event	Rank
2011–12	Kontiolahti	Mixed Relay	3rd place, bronze medalist(s)
