= Marek Matiaško =

Slovak biathlete (born 1977)

Personal information
- Born: October 29, 1977 Bojnice, Czechoslovakia

Sport
- Sport: Skiing
Medal record
Representing Slovakia
Junior World Championships
| Bronze medal – third place | 1997 Forni Avoltri | 10 km sprint |

Marek Matiaško (born 29 October 1977) is a former Slovak biathlete.

Matiaško was born in Bojnice, Trenčín, Slovakia on 29 October 1977.

He competed in the 2002, 2006 and 2010 Winter Olympics in a range of biathlon events. His highest finish was 5th in the 20 km at the 2006 Olympics.

Matiaško retired from the sport after the 2009–10 season.
