= Ľubomíra Kalinová =

Slovak biathlete (born 1982)

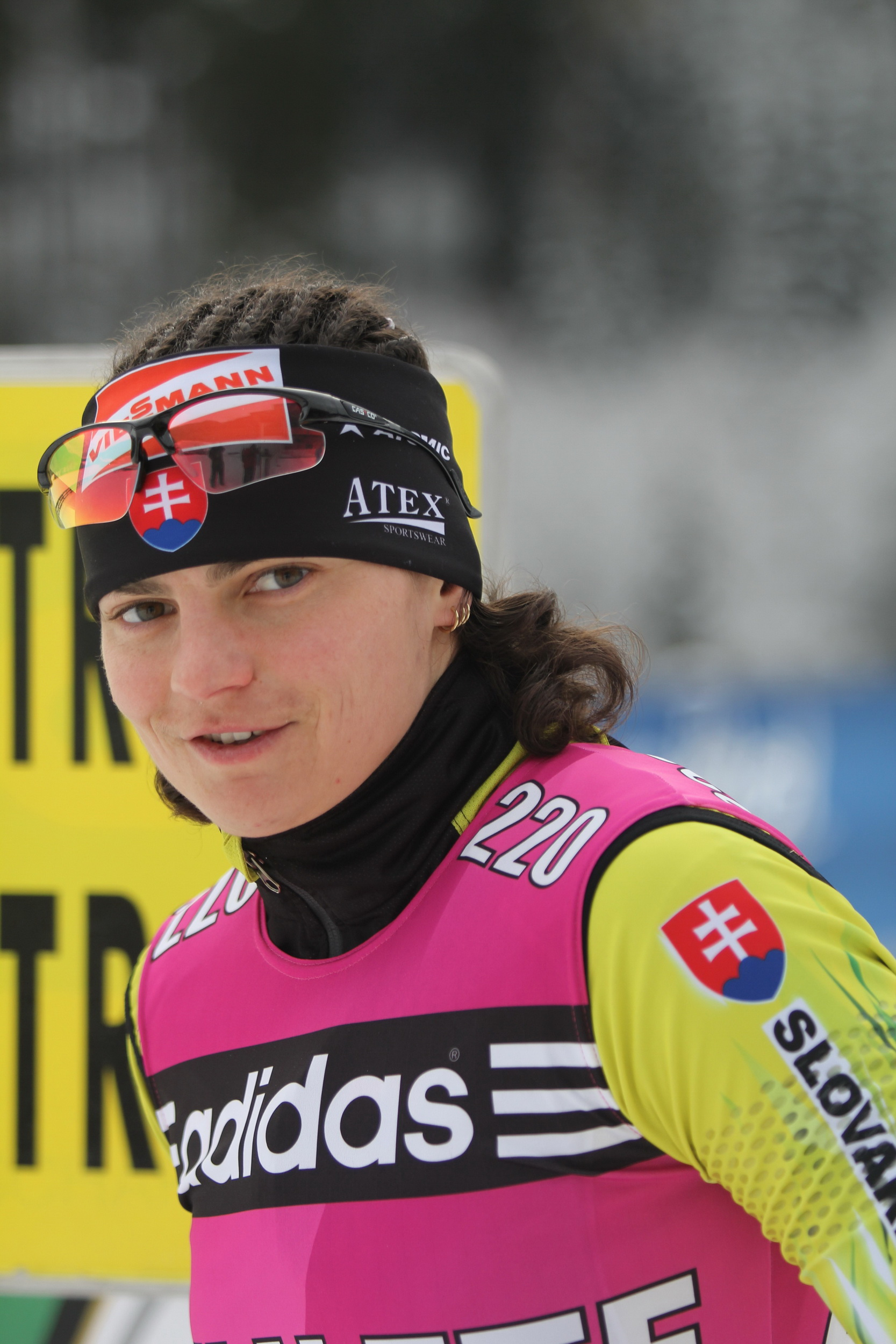

Personal information
- Born: 11 February 1982 (age 44) Banská Bystrica, Czechoslovakia (present day Slovakia)

Sport
- Sport: Skiing
- Updated on 28 February 2013

Ľubomíra Kalinová (born in Banská Bystrica on 11 February 1982) is a Slovak biathlete.

Kalinová competed in the 2010 Winter Olympics for Slovakia. Her best performance was 80th in the individual. She also finished 81st in the sprint.

As of February 2013, her best performance at the Biathlon World Championships is 13th, as part of the 2009 Slovak women's relay team. Her best individual performance is 73rd, in the 2009 individual.

As of February 2013, Kalinová's best performance in a Biathlon World Cup event is 6th, as part of the women's relay team at Oberhof in 2011/12. Her best individual result is 31st, in the sprint at Vancouver in 2008/09. Her best overall finish in the Biathlon World Cup is 86th, in 2008/09.
