= Dave McMahon =

Canadian biathlete (born 1964)

Dave McMahon (born May 1964) is a Canadian biathlete who competed for CAN 1989–1994. He was 7 time Provincial Champion and 5 time Canada Cup Overall winner, NORAM champion and Canadian National Biathlon Champion in 1993. He was ranked 3rd in the World for Summer Biathlon (trail running and shooting) in 1991. Dave McMahon also raced for Canada in cross-country skiing, snowshoeing, trail running, and winter triathlon. He is a 7x National Winter Triathlon Champion. Since 1994, he has been co-founder and coach of the Natural Fitness Lab - A centre of Excellence in Outdoor Sport and the second largest adult Trail running and XC ski club in Canada against their sister club Apex Run Tribe. Dave was the World Masters Cross Country Ski Champion in 2022 and National Champion in 2023. in Canada.
