= Kseniya Zikunkova =

Belarusian biathlete (born 1979)

Personal information
- Full name: Kseniya Pavlovna Zikunkova
- Nationality: Belarusian
- Born: 2 February 1979 (age 46); Kuznechnoye, Leningrad Oblast, Russian SFSR

Sport
- Sport: Biathlon

Kseniya Pavlovna Zikunkova (born 2 February 1979) is a Belarusian biathlete. She competed at the 2002 Winter Olympics and the 2006 Winter Olympics.
