= Matej Kazár =

Slovak biathlete (born 1983)

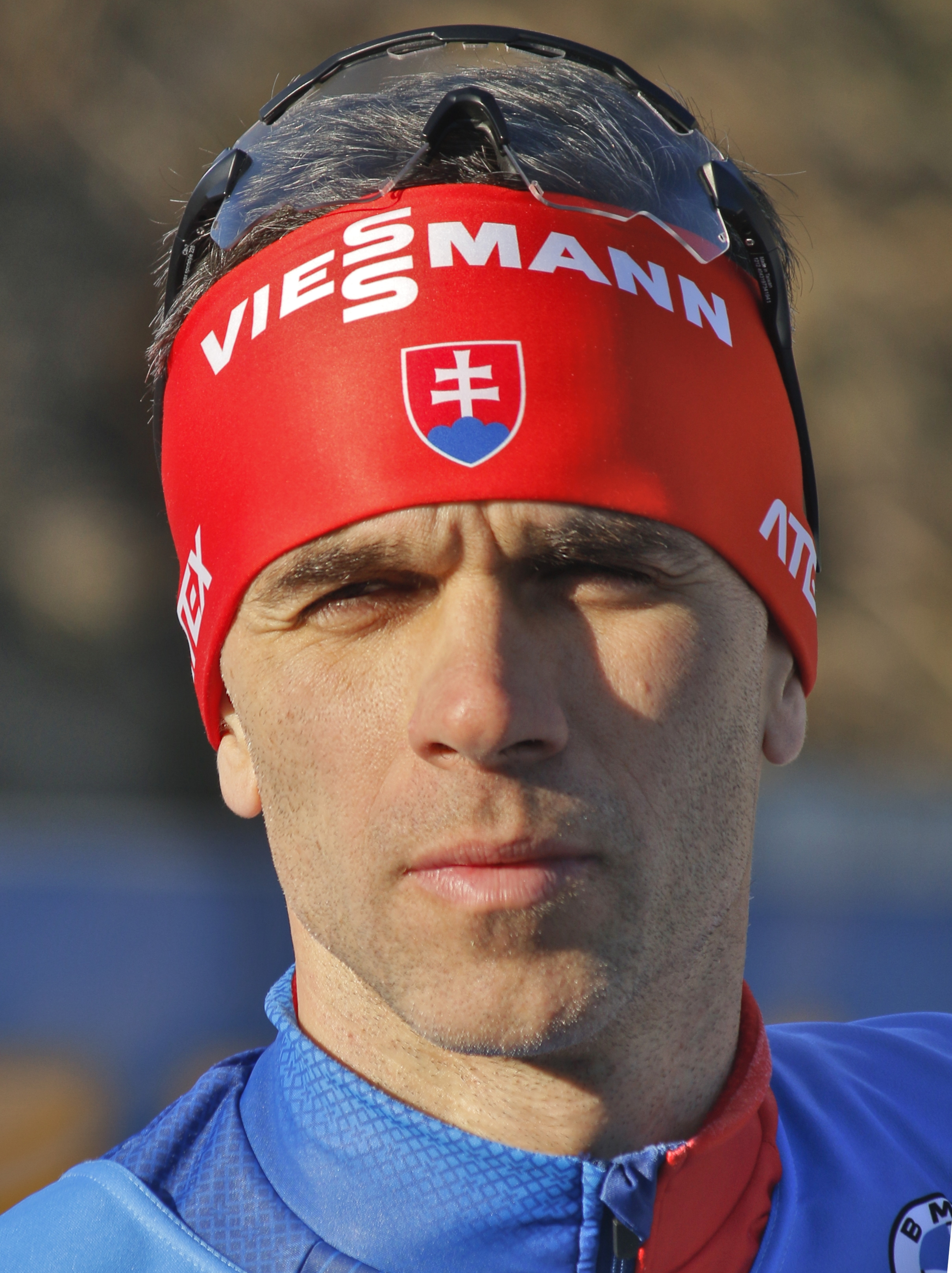
- Kazár in 2023

Personal information
- Born: 10 May 1983 (age 43) Košice, Czechoslovakia
- Height: 1.87 m (6 ft 2 in)

Sport

Professional information
- Sport: Biathlon
- Club: VŠC Dukla Banská Bystrica
- World Cup debut: 16 March 2002

Olympic Games
- Teams: 3 (2006, 2014, 2018)
- Medals: 0

World Championships
- Teams: 8 (2005, 2006, 2008, 2009, 2011, 2012, 2013, 2015)
- Medals: 0

World Cup
- Seasons: 12 (2001/02, 2004/05–)
- Individual victories: 0
- All victories: 0
- Individual podiums: 0
- All podiums: 1
Medal record
Men's biathlon
Representing Slovakia
Summer World Championships
Gold medal – first place	2010 Duszniki-Zdrój	12.5 km pursuit
Silver medal – second place	2010 Duszniki-Zdrój	10 km sprint
Bronze medal – third place	2010 Duszniki-Zdrój	Mixed relay
Bronze medal – third place	2013 Forni Avoltri	Mixed relay
Junior European Championships
Gold medal – first place	2004 Minsk	15 km individual
Silver medal – second place	2000 Zakopane	4 × 7.5 km relay
Summer Junior World Championships
Silver medal – second place	2003 Forni Avoltri	3 × 4 km relay
Winter Universiade
Silver medal – second place	2011 Erzurum	20 km individual
European Youth Olympic Winter Festival
Gold medal – first place	1999 Poprad-Tatry	Mixed 4 x 5 km relay
- Updated on 22 March 2015

Matej Kazár (born 10 May 1983) is a Slovak biathlete. He competed in the 2006, the 2014 Winter Olympics, and the 2018 Winter Olympics for Slovakia where he finished 37th in the 2014 sprint.

== Biathlon results ==
All results are sourced from the International Biathlon Union.

=== Olympic Games ===
0 medals

Event	Individual	Sprint	Pursuit	Mass start	Relay	Mixed relay
(Italy) 2006 Torino	—	57th	52nd	—	—	—
(Russia) 2014 Sochi	19th	37th	23rd	15th	12th	4th
(South Korea) 2018 Pyeongchang	34th	22nd	31st	—	18th	20th

:*The mixed relay was added as an event in 2014.

=== World Championships ===
0 medals

Event	Individual	Sprint	Pursuit	Mass start	Relay	Mixed relay	Single mixed relay
(Sweden) 2008 Östersund	86th	42nd	37th	—	9th	—	—
(South Korea) 2009 Pyeongchang	—	73rd	—	—	—	—	—
(Russia) 2011 Khanty-Mansiysk	92nd	78th	—	—	—	—	—
(Germany) 2012 Ruhpolding	40th	29th	24th	—	12th	7th	—
(Czech Republic) 2013 Nové Město	53rd	30th	29th	—	10th	7th	—
(Finland) 2015 Kontiolahti	42nd	33rd	42nd	—	11th	—	—
(Norway) 2016 Oslo	73rd	57th	44th	—	12th	17th	—
(Austria) 2017 Hochfilzen	29th	77th	—	—	12th	—	—
(Sweden) 2019 Östersund	40th	49th	45th	—	18th	—	—
(Germany) 2023 Oberhof	95th	93rd	—	—	—	16th	—
(Czech Republic) 2024 Nové Město na Moravě	—	—	—	—	23rd	—	—

*During Olympic seasons competitions are only held for those events not included in the Olympic program.
**The single mixed relay was added as an event in 2019.
