= Michal Krčmář =

Czech biathlete (born 1991)

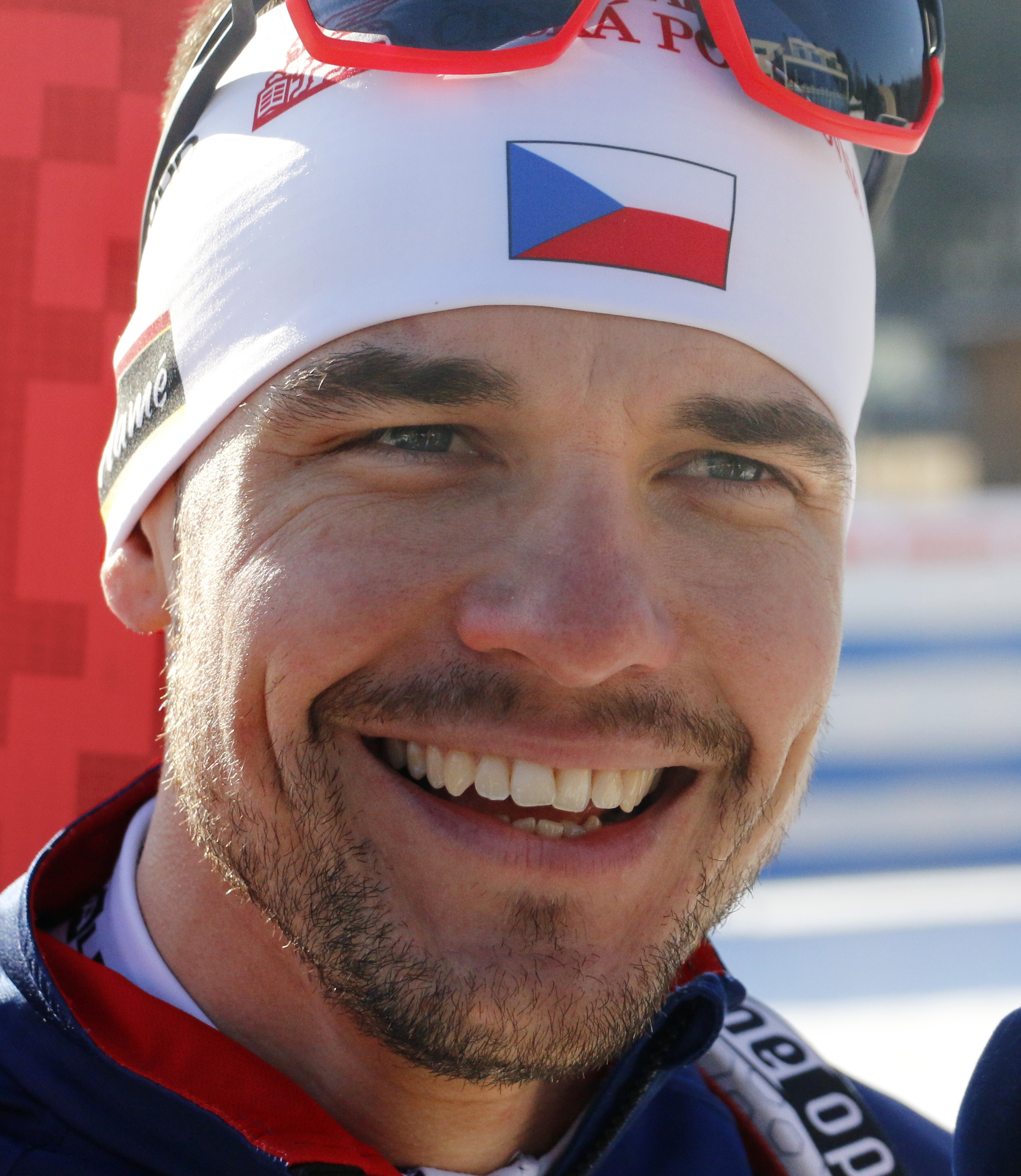
- Krčmář in 2023

Personal information
- Born: 23 January 1991 (age 35) Vrchlabí, Czechoslovakia
- Height: 1.76 m (5 ft 9 in)
- Weight: 69 kg (152 lb)

Sport

Professional information
- Sport: Biathlon
- Club: SKP Jablonec
- Skis: Rossignol
- Rifle: Anschütz
- World Cup debut: 10 February 2012

Olympic Games
- Teams: 3 (2014, 2018, 2022 )
- Medals: 1 (0 gold)

World Championships
- Teams: 10 (2013–2025)
- Medals: 2 (0 gold)

World Cup
- Seasons: 8 (2013/14–)
- Individual victories: 0
- All victories: 0
- Individual podiums: 1
- All podiums: 2
- Overall titles: 0
Medal record
Men's biathlon
Olympic Games
Silver medal – second place	2018 Pyeongchang	10 km sprint
World Championships
Silver medal – second place	2025 Lenzerheide	Mixed relay
Bronze medal – third place	2020 Antholz	Mixed relay
Junior World Championships
Silver medal – second place	2012 Kontiolahti	4 × 7.5 km relay
European Championships
Silver medal – second place	2021 Duszniki-Zdrój	12.5 km pursuit
Summer World Championships
Gold medal – first place	2018 Nové Město	10 km sprint
Gold medal – first place	2021 Nové Město	10 km sprint
Gold medal – first place	2021 Nové Město	12.5 km pursuit
Silver medal – second place	2018 Nové Město	12.5 km pursuit
Silver medal – second place	2018 Nové Město	Mixed relay

Michal Krčmář (Czech pronunciation: [ˈmɪxal ˈkr̩tʃmaːr̝̊]; born 23 January 1991) is a Czech biathlete and an Olympic silver medalist in the sprint at the 2018 Winter Olympics in Pyeongchang.

He was a part of the silver junior men's relay at Biathlon Junior World Championships 2012. Since 2013–14 season he has competed regularly at Biathlon World Cup and has amassed 300 World Cup Starts. He has competed at ten World Championships and three Olympic Games, including the 2014 Winter Olympics in Sochi, the 2018 Winter Olympics in Pyeongchang, and the 2022 Winter Olympics in Beijing.

His father, Daniel, represented Slovakia in biathlon at the 1994 Winter Olympics in Lillehammer.

== Personal life ==
In April 2022, his long-time partner Ramona gave birth to their first child Viktor. In March 2024, the couple welcomed their second child, a daughter named Tamara.

He is a follower of football, ice hockey and formula one. He supports the football team AC Sparta Praha.

== Career ==
The 2022-23 season brought the best season for Krčmář in his career. He finished 13th in the overall standings, 9th in the individual, sprint and mass start standings and 14th in the pursuit standings. This included notable results in Pokljuka (5th in the sprint), Ruhpolding (8th in the individual), Östersund (4th in the mass start), and Oslo (10th in the sprint and 9th in the pursuit). The Czech team had their best season for many years as well placing 6th in the nations cup (their best result since the 2015-16 season).

In August 2023 he suffered from a viral infection that briefly prevented him from training.

Competing during the 2023-24 season, he reached the top 10 in Lenzerheide (8th place in the mass start). Inconsistent results at the beginning of the second trimester as well as health issues forced him to withdraw from the World Cup in Antholz in order to prepare for the World Championships. He ended the season ranked 28th in the overall World Cup standings.

At the Biathlon World Championships 2025, he won his second World Championship medal as a member of the Czech Mixed Relay team. Krčmář anchored the team and managed to overtake Justus Strelow on the final lap to secure the medal. He also managed 8th place in the individual, his fourth top 10 result in this event at the World Championships.

== Biathlon results ==
All results are sourced from the International Biathlon Union.

=== Olympic Games ===
1 medal (1 silver medal)

Event	Individual	Sprint	Pursuit	Mass start	Relay	Mixed relay
(Russia) 2014 Sochi	60th	—	—	—	11th	—
(South Korea) 2018 Pyeongchang	7th	Silver	30th	26th	7th	8th
(China) 2022 Beijing	59th	16th	34th	21st	19th	12th
(Italy) 2026 Milano-Cortina	38th	28th	18th	6th	6th	11th

=== World Championships ===
2 medal (1 silver, 1 bronze)

Event	Individual	Sprint	Pursuit	Mass start	Relay	Mixed relay	Single mixed relay
(Czech Republic) 2013 Nové Město	—	—	—	—	6th	—	—N/a
(Finland) 2015 Kontiolahti	—	59th	47th	—	6th	—	—N/a
(Norway) 2016 Oslo Holmenkollen	5th	24th	22nd	22nd	5th	6th	—N/a
(Austria) 2017 Hochfilzen	6th	61st	—	22nd	10th	7th	—N/a
(Sweden) 2019 Östersund	23rd	44th	25th	28th	4th	6th	—
(Italy) 2020 Antholz-Anterselva	23rd	39th	27th	—	13th	Bronze	14th
(Slovenia) 2021 Pokljuka	26th	11th	21st	25th	13th	11th	—
(Germany) 2023 Oberhof	8th	14th	19th	27th	4th	5th	14th
(Czech Republic) 2024 Nové Město	26th	19th	18th	24th	7th	14th	—
(Switzerland) 2025 Lenzerheide	8th	23rd	23rd	23rd	6th	Silver	—

*During Olympic seasons competitions are only held for those events not included in the Olympic program.
