= Magdalena Grzywa =

Polish biathlete (born 1979)

Personal information
- Nationality: Polish
- Born: 15 September 1979 (age 46) Czernichów

Sport
- Sport: Biathlon
Medal record
Women's biathlon
Representing Poland
Junior World Championships
Bronze medal – third place	1999 Pokljuka	7.5 km sprint
Bronze medal – third place	1999 Pokljuka	3 × 7.5 km relay

Magdalena Grzywa (born 15 September 1979) is a Polish biathlete. She competed in two events at the 2006 Winter Olympics.
