= Lyudmila Lysenko (biathlete) =

Belarusian biathlete (born 1973)

Personal information
- Native name: Людмила Васильевна Лысенко (-Арлуская)
- Full name: Lyudmila Vasilyevna Lysenko (-Arluskaya)
- Nationality: Belarusian
- Born: 2 November 1973 (age 51); Vyshny Volochyok], Tver, Russia
- Height: 160 cm (5 ft 3 in)
- Weight: 55 kg (121 lb)

Sport
- Country: Belarus
- Sport: Biathlon

Lyudmila Vasilyevna Lysenko (Людмила Васильевна Лысенко, born 2 November 1973), also using the surname Arluskaya (Арлуская), is a Belarusian biathlete. She competed at the 1994 Winter Olympics and the 2002 Winter Olympics.
