= Irina Tananayko =

Belarusian biathlete (born 1976)

Personal information
- Nationality: Belarusian
- Born: 5 March 1976 (age 49)

Sport
- Sport: Biathlon

Irina Tananayko (born 5 March 1976) is a Belarusian biathlete. She competed in the three events at the 1998 Winter Olympics.
