= Cornel Puchianu =

Romanian biathlete (born 1989)

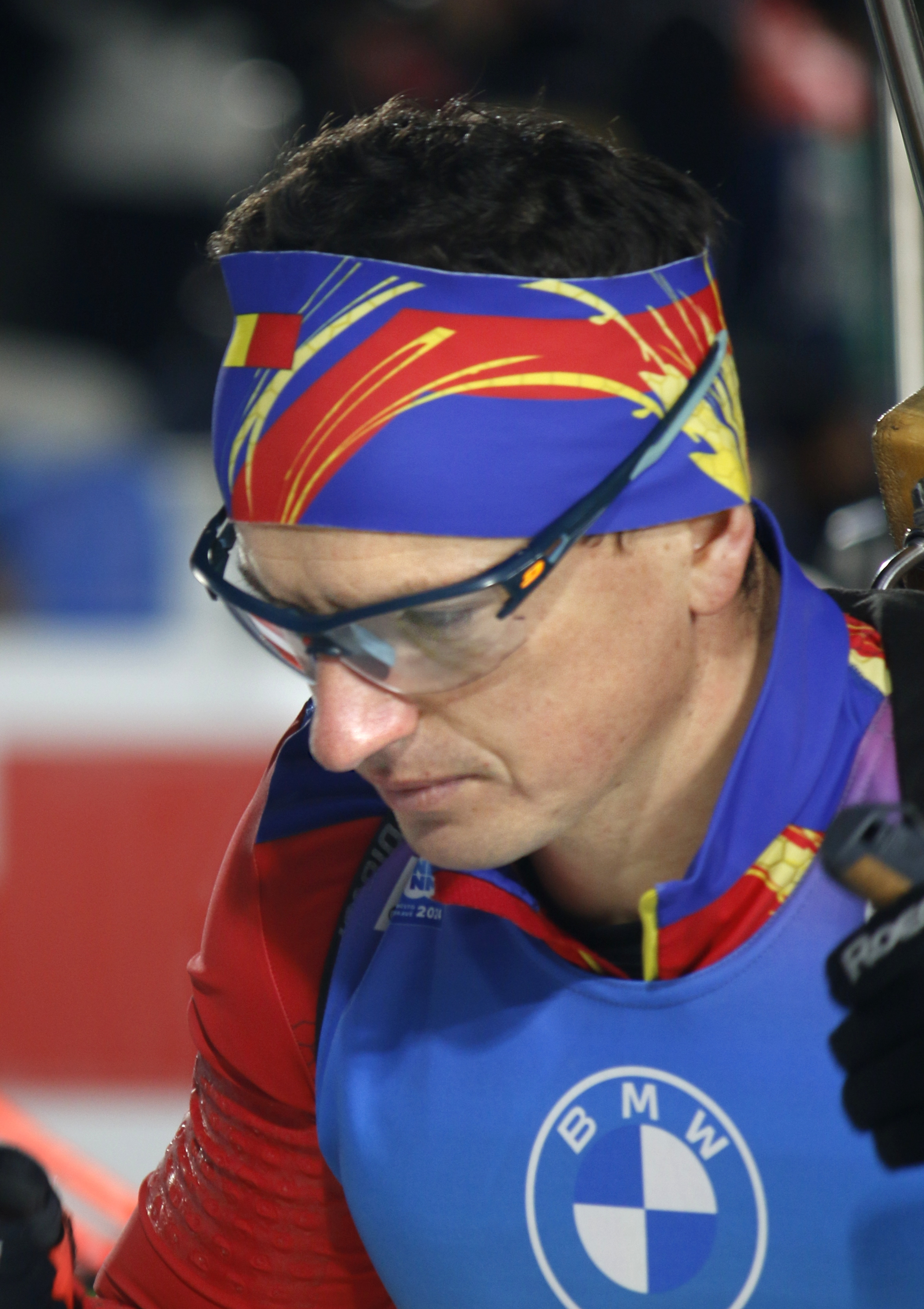
- Cornel Puchianu (2024)

Personal information
- Full name: Cornel Dumitru Puchianu
- Born: 27 October 1989 (age 35); Brasov, Romanian PR
- Height: 5 ft 9 in (175 cm)
- Weight: 152 lb (69 kg)

Sport
- Country: Romania
- Sport: Biathlon

Cornel Dumitru Puchianu (born 27 October 1989 in Brașov) is a Romanian winter-sportsman who debuted in biathlon in 2012. He had previously competed in cross-country skiing. He competed for Romania at the 2014 Winter Olympics and the 2018 Winter Olympics. He won the bronze medal in sprint at the Summer Biathlon World Championships 2021.

== Biathlon results ==
All results are sourced from the International Biathlon Union.

=== Olympic Games ===
0 medals

| Event | Individual | Sprint | Pursuit | Mass start | Relay | Mixed relay |
|---|---|---|---|---|---|---|
| (Russia) 2014 Sochi | 59th | 30th | 47th | — | — | — |
| (South Korea) 2018 Pyeongchang | 55th | 60th | 58th | — | 14th | — |

*The mixed relay was added as an event in 2014.

=== World Championships ===
0 medals

| Event | Individual | Sprint | Pursuit | Mass start | Relay | Mixed relay | Single mixed relay |
|---|---|---|---|---|---|---|---|
| (Czech Republic) 2013 Nové Město | 75th | 74th | — | — | 18th | 20th | — |
| (Finland) 2015 Kontiolahti | 67th | 32nd | 34th | — | 22nd | 20th | — |
| (Norway) 2016 Oslo Holmenkollen | 94th | 26th | 50th | — | 18th | 22nd | — |
| (Austria) 2017 Hochfilzen | 76th | 20th | 38th | — | 17th | 20th | — |
| (Sweden) 2019 Östersund | 53rd | 88th | — | — | 22nd | 26th | — |
| (Italy) 2020 Antholz-Anterselva | 63rd | 74th | — | — | 23rd | 26th | — |
| (Slovenia) 2021 Pokljuka | 62nd | 84th | — | — | 14th | 25th | — |
| (Czech Republic) 2024 Nové Město na Moravě | — | 83rd | — | — | — | — | — |

*During Olympic seasons competitions are only held for those events not included in the Olympic program.
**The single mixed relay was added as an event in 2019.
